= 1978–79 Celtic F.C. season =

Celtic
1978–79 season
- Chairman: Desmond White
- Manager: Billy McNeil
- Stadium: Celtic Park
- Scottish Premier Division: 1st
- Scottish Cup: 5th Round
- Scottish League Cup: Semi-finalists
- Anglo-Scottish Cup: Quarter-finalists
- Top goalscorer: League: Tom McAdam 7 All: Tom McAdam 13
- Highest home attendance: 55,867
- Lowest home attendance: 14,728
- Average home league attendance: 25,469

The 1978–79 Celtic F.C. season began with a significant change. Former club captain Billy McNeill took over from Jock Stein. Stein stepped down after 13 incredibly successful years, during which he led the club to numerous triumphs. His final season, however, was disappointing, with Celtic finishing fifth in the league, missing out on European football qualification, and failing to secure any silverware in the domestic cups.

Billy McNeill returned to Celtic after a promising spell managing Aberdeen F.C., where he finished as runners-up in both the Premier Division and the Scottish Cup. During the summer, McNeill appointed his former defensive partner and assistant at Aberdeen, John Clark, as his assistant at Celtic. and brought in Frank Connor to manage the Reserve team, Jimmy Lumsden also joined as a player with additional coaching responsibilities for the reserve team. In the transfer market McNeill made two significant signings in the autumn: winger David Provan from Kilmarnock F.C. and midfielder Murdo MacLeod from Dumbarton F.C.. Both were young and talented players who would go on to play key roles at Celtic for many years. Additionally, former Celtic players Bobby Lennox and Vic Davidson returned to the club later in the season.

Celtic made a bright start in the league during August and early September. However, their form became inconsistent from October through December, and they dropped several points. Harsh winter weather caused all league games in January and February to be postponed. When the league resumed in March, Celtic's form improved significantly, helped by the return of Captain Danny McGrain, who had been out with a serious long term injury. The club faced a busy schedule in May, playing six games, with the final match against Rangers F.C. becoming the decisive fixture for the league title. A victory in this match would ensure the league flag returned to Celtic Park in McNeill's first season as manager. In a dramatic encounter, Celtic triumphed 4-2, despite being down to 10 men for most of the game—a match that remains fondly remembered by Celtic supporters.

In the League Cup, Celtic progressed to the semi-finals but were narrowly defeated by Rangers 3-2 after extra time.

In the Scottish Cup, a fifth-round replay loss to Aberdeen allowed Celtic to focus solely on their pursuit of the Premier Division title.

Billy McNeill's first season was regarded as a success, restoring the club to the top of Scottish football and allowing the club to make a return to compete in Europe's premier competition the following season.

== Pre-season and friendlies ==
Due to the 1978 FIFA World Cup, Celtic only managed 2 pre-season friendlies plus the Jock Stein Testimonial game against Liverpool two days after the League opener against Morton.

29 July 1978 Friendly	Montrose	1-3	Celtic	Montrose, Scotland
	Livingstone 20'	Report	Aitken 23', McCluskey 56', 74'	Stadium: Links Park; Attendance: 2,300; Referee: R.B Valentine (Dundee)

8 August 1978 Friendly	Celtic	0-3	Arsenal	Glasgow,Scotland
		Report	Lynch 29', MacDonald 76', Stapleton 83'	Stadium: Celtic Park; Attendance: 24,000; Referee: K. Hope (Glasgow)

14 August 1978 Jock Stein Testimonial	Celtic	2–3	Liverpool	Glasgow, Scotland
19:30 GMT	Glavin 21', McAdam 44'	Report	Kennedy 32' Dalglish 40', 55'	Stadium: Celtic Park; Attendance: 62,000; Referee: Brian McGinlay (Balfron)

== Competitions ==
=== Scottish Premier Division ===
==== League table ====
Pos	Team	Pld	W	D	L	GF	GA	GD	Pts	Qualification or relegation
1	Celtic (C)	36	21	6	9	61	37	+24	48	Qualification for the European Cup first round
2	Rangers	36	18	9	9	52	35	+17	45	Qualification for the Cup Winners' Cup first round
3	Dundee United	36	18	8	10	56	37	+19	44	Qualification for the UEFA Cup first round
4	Aberdeen	36	13	14	9	59	36	+23	40	Qualification for the UEFA Cup first round
5	Hibernian	36	12	13	11	44	48	−4	37	

Source: Statto and RSSSF
Rules for classification: 1) points; 2) goal difference; 3) number of goals scored.
(C) Champions

==== Matches ====
12 August 1978 Premier League	Morton	1–2	Celtic	Greenock
15:00				Stadium: Cappielow Park; Attendance: 16,040

19 August 1978 Premier League	Celtic	4–0	Hearts	Glasgow
15:00				Stadium: Celtic Park; Attendance: 22,907

26 August 1978 Premier League	Motherwell	1–5	Celtic	Motherwell
15:00				Stadium: Fir Park; Attendance: 19,710

9 September 1978 Premier League	Celtic	3–1	Rangers	Glasgow
15:00				Stadium: Celtic Park; Attendance: 55,867

16 September 1978 Premier League	Celtic	0–1	Hibernian	Glasgow
15:00 BST				Stadium: Celtic Park; Attendance: 26,169

23 September 1978 Premier League	Partick Thistle	2–3	Celtic	Glasgow
15:00 BST				Stadium: Firhill Park; Attendance: 21,272

30 September 1978 Premier League	Celtic	2–1	St Mirren	Glasgow
15:00 BST				Stadium: Celtic Park; Attendance: 25,379

7 October 1978 Premier League	Aberdeen	4–1	Celtic	Aberdeen
15:00 BST				Stadium: Pittodrie Stadium; Attendance: 22,563

14 October 1978 Premier League	Dundee United	1–0	Celtic	Dundee
15:00 BST				Stadium: Tannadice Park; Attendance: 17,726

21 October 1978 Premier League	Celtic	0–0	Morton	Glasgow
15:00 BST				Stadium: Celtic Park; Attendance: 22,220

28 October 1978 Premier League	Hearts	2–0	Celtic	Edinburgh
15:00 BST				Stadium: Tynecastle Park; Attendance: 19,269

4 November 1978 Premier League	Celtic	1–2	Motherwell	Glasgow
15:00 GMT				Stadium: Celtic Park; Attendance: 19,808

11 November 1978 Premier League	Rangers	1–1	Celtic	Glasgow
15:00 GMT				Stadium: Hampden Park; Attendance: 53,941

18 November 1978 Premier League	Hibernian	2–2	Celtic	Edinburgh
15:00 GMT				Stadium: Easter Road; Attendance: 21,450

25 November 1978 Premier League	Celtic	1–0	Partick Thistle	Glasgow
15:00 GMT				Stadium: Celtic Park; Attendance: 24,669

9 December 1978 Premier League	Celtic	0–0	Aberdeen	Glasgow
15:00 GMT				Stadium: Celtic Park; Attendance: 22,646

16 December 1978 Premier League	Celtic	1–1	Dundee United	Glasgow
15:00 GMT				Stadium: Celtic Park; Attendance: 19,868

23 December 1978 Premier League	Morton	1–0	Celtic	Greenock
15:00 GMT				Stadium: Cappielow Park; Attendance: 12,636

3 March 1979 Premier League	Celtic	1–0	Aberdeen	Glasgow
15:00 GMT				Stadium: Celtic Park; Attendance: 25,331

17 March 1979 Premier League	Celtic	2–1	Motherwell	Glasgow
15:00 GMT				Stadium: Celtic Park; Attendance: 14,866

28 March 1979 Premier League	Celtic	3–0	Morton	Glasgow
19:30 GMT				Stadium: Celtic Park; Attendance: 17,728

31 March 1979 Premier League	Hibernian	2–1	Celtic	Edinburgh
15:00 GMT				Stadium: Easter Road; Attendance: 16,071

4 April 1979 Premier League	Motherwell	3–4	Celtic	Motherwell
19:30 GMT				Stadium: Fir Park; Attendance: 8,744

7 April 1979 Premier League	Celtic	2–0	Partick Thistle	Glasgow
15:00 GMT				Stadium: Celtic Park; Attendance: 17,478

11 April 1979 Premier League	Dundee United	2–1	Celtic	Dundee
19:30 GMT				Stadium: Tannadice Park; Attendance: 14,424

14 April 1979 Premier League	St Mirren	0–1	Celtic	Paisley
15:00 GMT				Stadium: St Mirren Park, Love Street; Attendance: 19,549

18 April 1979 Premier League	Hearts	0–3	Celtic	Edinburgh
19:30 GMT				Stadium: Tynecastle Park; Attendance: 10,633

21 April 1979 Premier League	Aberdeen	1–1	Celtic	Aberdeen
15:00 GMT				Stadium: Pittodrie Stadium; Attendance: 22,593

25 April 1979 Premier League	Celtic	2–1	St Mirren	Glasgow
19:30 GMT				Stadium: Celtic Park; Attendance: 17,171

28 April 1979 Premier League	Celtic	2–1	Dundee United	Glasgow
15:00 BST				Stadium: Celtic Park; Attendance: 35,807

2 May 1979 Premier League	Celtic	3–1	Hibernian	Glasgow
19:30 BST				Stadium: Celtic Park; Attendance: 21,728

5 May 1979 Premier League	Rangers	1–0	Celtic	Glasgow
15:00 BST				Stadium: Hampden Park; Attendance: 51,359

7 May 1979 Premier League	Partick Thistle	1–2	Celtic	Glasgow
15:00 BST				Stadium: Firhill Park; Attendance: 17,659

11 May 1979 Premier League	St Mirren	0–2	Celtic	Paisley
19:30 BST				Stadium: St Mirren Park, Love Street; Attendance: 20,800

14 May 1979 Premier League	Celtic	1–0	Hearts	Edinburgh
19:30 BST				Stadium: Tynecastle Park; Attendance: 16,507

21 May 1979 Premier League	Celtic	4–2	Rangers	Glasgow
19:30 BST				Stadium: Celtic Park; Attendance: 55,296

=== Scottish Cup ===
31 January 1979 Third round	Montrose	2–4	Celtic	Montrose
19:30 GMT				Stadium: Links Park; Attendance: 3,066

26 February 1979 Fourth round	Celtic	3–0	Berwick Rangers	Glasgow
19:30 GMT				Stadium: Celtic Park; Attendance: 13,000

10 March 1979 Fifth round	Aberdeen	1–1	Celtic	Glasgow
15:00 GMT				Stadium: Celtic Park; Attendance: 23,000

14 March 1979 Fifth round replay	Celtic	1–2	Aberdeen	Glasgow
19:30 GMT				Stadium: Celtic Park; Attendance: 37,000

=== Scottish League Cup ===
16 August 1978 First round 1st leg	Celtic	3–1	Dundee	Glasgow
19:30 GMT				Stadium: Celtic Park; Attendance: 10,515

23 August 1978 First round 2nd leg	Dundee	0–3 (2–6 agg.)	Celtic	Dundee
19:30 GMT				Stadium: Dens Park; Attendance: 12,698

30 August 1978 Second round 1st leg	Dundee United	2–3	Celtic	Dundee
19:30 GMT				Stadium: Tannadice Park; Attendance: 12,648

2 September 1978 Second round 2nd leg	Celtic	1–0 (4–2 agg.)	Dundee United	Glasgow
15:00 GMT				Stadium: Celtic Park; Attendance: 28,563

4 October 1978 Third round 1st leg	Celtic	0–1	Motherwell	Glasgow
19:30 GMT				Stadium: Celtic Park; Attendance: 17,643

11 October 1978 Third round 2nd leg	Motherwell	1–4 (2–4 agg.)	Celtic	Motherwell
19:30 GMT				Stadium: Fir Park; Attendance: 17,911

8 November 1978 Quarter-final 1st leg	Montrose	1–1	Celtic	Montrose
19:30 GMT				Stadium: Links Park; Attendance: 4,284

15 November 1978 Quarter-final 2nd leg	Celtic	3–1 (4–2 agg.)	Montrose	Glasgow
19:30 GMT				Stadium: Celtic Park; Attendance: 9,372

13 December 1978 Semi-final	Rangers	3–2 (aet)	Celtic	Glasgow
19:30 GMT				Stadium: Hampden Park; Attendance: 49,349

=== Anglo-Scottish Cup ===
3 August 1978 1st round 1st leg	Celtic (Scotland)	2–1	(Scotland) Clyde	Glasgow
20:00 GMT				Stadium: Celtic Park; Attendance: 10,000

5 August 1978 1st round 2nd leg	Clyde (Scotland)	1–6 (2–8 agg.)	(Scotland) Celtic	Glasgow
20:00 GMT				Stadium: Shawfield Stadium; Attendance: 12,000

12 September 1978 Quarter-final 1st leg	Burnley (England)	1–0	(Scotland) Celtic	Burnley
20:00 GMT				Stadium: Turf Moor; Attendance: 25,000

27 September 1978 Quarter-final 2nd leg	Celtic (Scotland)	1–2 (1–3 agg.)	(England) Burnley	Glasgow
20:00 GMT				Stadium: Celtic Park; Attendance: 27,000

=== Glasgow Cup ===
8 May 1979 Semi-final	Celtic	3–2	Clyde	Glasgow
19:30 BST				Stadium: Celtic Park; Attendance: 2,000

16 May 1979 Final	Rangers	3–1	Celtic	Glasgow
19:30 BST				Stadium: Ibrox Park; Attendance: 2,000

== Statistics ==
=== Appearances and goals ===
Pos.		Name	League		Scottish Cup		League Cup		Total	
Pos.		Name	Apps	Goals	Apps	Goals	Apps	Goals	Apps	Goals
GK	(England)	Peter Latchford	26	0	4	0	6	0	37	0
GK	(England)	Roy Baines	7	0	0	0	3	0	10	0
GK	(Republic of Ireland)	Packie Bonner	2	0	0	0	0	0	2	0
DF	(Scotland)	Joe Filippi	19(1)	0	1	0	8	0	28(1)	0
DF	(Scotland)	Danny McGrain	18	2	4	0	1	0	23	2
DF	(Scotland)	Alan Sneddon	4	0	0	0	1	0	5	0
DF	(Scotland)	Andy Lynch	27(1)	7	4	2	7	3	38(1)	12
DF	(Scotland)	Roddie MacDonald	18	2	4	0	9	1	31	3
DF	(Scotland)	Mike Conroy	20(1)	4	0	0	5	1	25(1)	5
DF	(Iceland)	Jóhannes Eðvaldsson	34	1	4	0	9	1	47	2
MF	(Scotland)	Jim Casey	1(4)	0	0	0	1(3)	0	2(7)	0
MF	(Scotland)	Murdo MacLeod	23	3	4	0	0	0	27	3
MF	(Scotland)	Peter Mackie	0(2)	0	0	0	0	0	0(2)	0
MF	(Scotland)	Roy Aitken	36	5	3	0	9	1	48	6
MF	(Scotland)	Tommy Burns	28(1)	3	3	1	8	0	39(1)	4
MF	(Scotland)	Paul Wilson	0(1)	0	0	0	1(1)	0	1(2)	0
FW	(Scotland)	Ronnie Glavin	9(1)	3	0	0	4(2)	2	13(3)	5
FW	(Scotland)	Tom McAdam	24(4)	7	0(1)	0	9	6	33(5)	13
FW	(Scotland)	Johnny Doyle	23(3)	2	4	1	6(1)	3	33(4)	6
FW	(Scotland)	David Provan	30	4	4	0	5	0	39	4
FW	(Scotland)	George McCluskey	16(5)	5	2	3	1(3)	0	19(8)	8
FW	(Scotland)	Joe Craig	0(1)	0	0	0	0	0	0(1)	0
FW	(Scotland)	Alfie Conn Jr.	12(1)	6	2	0	5	1	19(1)	7
FW	(Scotland)	Bobby Lennox	6(8)	4	1(1)	1	1(1)	1	8(10)	6

=== Goalscorers ===
R	Pos.	Nation	Name	Premier Division	Scottish Cup	League Cup	Total
1	FW	(Scotland)	Tom McAdam	7	0	6	13
2	DF	(Scotland)	Andy Lynch	7	2	3	12
3	FW	(Scotland)	George McCluskey	5	3	0	8
4	FW	(Scotland)	Alfie Conn Jr.	6	0	1	7
5	MF	(Scotland)	Roy Aitken	5	0	1	6
5	FW	(Scotland)	Bobby Lennox	4	1	1	6
5	FW	(Scotland)	Johnny Doyle	2	1	3	6
6	FW	(Scotland)	Ronnie Glavin	3	0	2	5
6	DF	(Scotland)	Mike Conroy	4	0	1	5
7	MF	(Scotland)	David Provan	4	0	0	4
7	MF	(Scotland)	Tommy Burns	3	1	0	4
8	MF	(Scotland)	Murdo MacLeod	3	0	0	3
8	DF	(Scotland)	Roddie MacDonald	2	0	1	3
9	DF	(Scotland)	Danny McGrain	2	0	0	2
9	DF	(Iceland)	Jóhannes Eðvaldsson	1	0	1	2
Total				60	8	21	89

== Club ==
=== Officials ===
Position	Name
Chairman	Desmond White
Secretary	Desmond White
Directors	Thomas Devlin James Farrell Kevin Kelly

=== Management ===
Position	Name
Manager	Billy McNeill
Assistant manager	John Clark
Reserve Team Manager	Frank Connor
Reserve Coach	Jimmy Lumsden
Trainer	Neil Mochan
Physio	Bob Rooney
Masseur	Jimmy Steele
Chief Scout	John Kelman

== Kit ==
Celtic continued to wear their Umbro home shirt that was released the previous season which incorporated the club badge on a home shirt for the first time. Celtic only wore their home shirt during the entire season.

=== Home ===
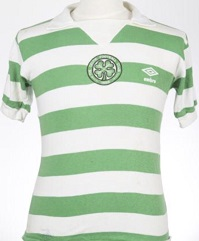
Home Shirt 1977-79

== Transfers ==
=== In ===
Date	Name	From	Transfer Fee
July 1978	(Scotland) Jim Lumsden	(Scotland) Clydebank	£10,000
September 1978	(Scotland) Davie Provan	(Scotland) Kilmarnock	£120,000
October 1978	(Scotland) Bobby Lennox	(United States) Houston Hurricane	Free
November 1978	(Scotland) Murdo MacLeod	(Scotland) Dumbarton	£100,000
March 1979	(Scotland) Vic Davidson	(England) Blackpool	£35,000
		Total Transfer Fees	£265,000

=== Out ===
Date	Name	To	Transfer Fee
August 1978	(Scotland) Pat Stanton	Retired	Released
September 1978	(Scotland) Paul Wilson	(Scotland) Motherwell	£50,000
September 1978	(Scotland) Joe Craig	(England) Blackburn Rovers	£40,000
March 1979	(England) Roy Baines	(Scotland) Greenock Morton	£12,000
April 1979	(Scotland) Alfie Conn Jr.	(England) Derby County	Free Transfer
April 1979	(Scotland) John Dowie	(England) Doncaster Rovers	Free Transfer
		Total Transfer Fees	£102,000
