= 1980–81 Celtic F.C. season =

Celtic
1980–81 season
- Chairman: Desmond White
- Manager: Billy McNeil
- Stadium: Celtic Park
- Scottish Premier Division: 1st
- Scottish Cup: Semi-final
- Scottish League Cup: Semi-final
- European Cup: 1st round
- Drybrough Cup: 1st round
- Top goalscorer: League: Frank McGarvey 23; All: Frank McGarvey 29
- Highest home attendance: 54,862
- Lowest home attendance: 11,856
- Average home league attendance: 22,836

During the 1980–81 Scottish football season, Celtic competed in the Scottish Premier Division.

== Competitions ==
=== Scottish Premier Division ===
==== League table ====
Pos	Team	Pld	W	D	L	GF	GA	GD	Pts	Qualification or relegation
1	Celtic (C)	36	26	4	6	84	37	+47	56	Qualification for the European Cup first round
2	Aberdeen	36	19	11	6	61	26	+35	49	Qualification for the UEFA Cup first round
3	Rangers	36	16	12	8	60	32	+28	44	Qualification for the Cup Winners' Cup first round
4	St Mirren	36	18	8	10	56	47	+9	44	
5	Dundee United	36	17	9	10	66	42	+24	43	Qualification for the UEFA Cup first round

Source: Statto
Rules for classification: 1) points; 2) goal difference; 3) number of goals scored.
(C) Champions

==== Matches ====
9 August 1980 Premier League	Celtic	2–1	Morton	Glasgow
15:00				Stadium: Celtic Park; Attendance: 19,058

16 August 1980 Premier League	Kilmarnock	0–3	Celtic	Kilmarnock
15:00				Stadium: Rugby Park; Attendance: 13,810

23 August 1980 Premier League	Celtic	1–2	Rangers	Glasgow
15:00				Stadium: Celtic Park; Attendance: 54,682

6 September 1980 Premier League	Celtic	4–1	Partick Thistle	Glasgow
15:00				Stadium: Celtic Park; Attendance: 19,003

13 September 1980 Premier League	Hearts	0–2	Celtic	Edinburgh
15:00 BST				Stadium: Tynecastle Park; Attendance: 17,169

20 September 1980 Premier League	Celtic	1–1	Airdrieonians	Glasgow
15:00 BST				Stadium: Celtic Park; Attendance: 17,393

27 September 1980 Premier League	Aberdeen	2–2	Celtic	Aberdeen
15:00 BST				Stadium: Pittodrie Stadium; Attendance: 21,522

4 October 1980 Premier League	Celtic	2–0	Dundee United	Glasgow
15:00 BST				Stadium: Celtic Park; Attendance: 19,571

11 October 1980 Premier League	St Mirren	0–2	Celtic	Paisley
15:00 BST				Stadium: St Mirren Park, Love Street; Attendance: 18,443

18 October 1980 Premier League	Morton	2–3	Celtic	Greenock
15:00 BST				Stadium: Cappielow Park; Attendance: 14,233

25 October 1980 Premier League	Celtic	4–1	Kilmarnock	Glasgow
15:00 BST				Stadium: Celtic Park; Attendance: 16,537

1 November 1980 Premier League	Rangers	3–0	Celtic	Glasgow
15:00 GMT				Stadium: Ibrox Stadium; Attendance: 32,206

8 November 1980 Premier League	Celtic	0–2	Aberdeen	Glasgow
15:00 GMT				Stadium: Celtic Park; Attendance: 28,060

15 November 1980 Premier League	Airdrieonians	1–4	Celtic	Airdrie
15:00 GMT				Stadium: Broomfield Park; Attendance: 12,550

22 November 1980 Premier League	Celtic	1–2	St Mirren	Glasgow
15:00 GMT				Stadium: Celtic Park; Attendance: 14,839

29 November 1980 Premier League	Dundee United	0–3	Celtic	Dundee
15:00 GMT				Stadium: Tannadice Park; Attendance: 13,080

6 December 1980 Premier League	Partick Thistle	0–1	Celtic	Glasgow
15:00 GMT				Stadium: Firhill Park; Attendance: 12,513

13 December 1980 Premier League	Celtic	3–2	Hearts	Glasgow
15:00 GMT				Stadium: Celtic Park; Attendance: 14,070

20 December 1980 Premier League	Celtic	2–1	Airdrieonians	Glasgow
15:00 GMT				Stadium: Celtic Park; Attendance: 11,856

27 December 1980 Premier League	Aberdeen	4–1	Celtic	Aberdeen
15:00 GMT				Stadium: Pittodrie Stadium; Attendance: 14,089

1 January 1981 Premier League	Kilmarnock	1–2	Celtic	Kilmarnock
15:00 GMT				Stadium: Rugby Park; Attendance: 7,625

3 January 1981 Premier League	Celtic	3–0	Morton	Glasgow
15:00 GMT				Stadium: Celtic Park; Attendance: 15,190

10 January 1981 Premier League	Celtic	2–1	Dundee United	Glasgow
15:00 GMT				Stadium: Celtic Park; Attendance: 22,132

31 January 1981 Premier League	Hearts	0–3	Celtic	Edinburgh
15:00 GMT				Stadium: Tynecastle Park; Attendance: 14,596

21 February 1981 Premier League	Celtic	3–1	Rangers	Glasgow
15:00 GMT				Stadium: Celtic Park; Attendance: 53,336

28 February 1981 Premier League	Morton	0–3	Celtic	Greenock
15:00 GMT				Stadium: Cappielow Park; Attendance: 12,776

14 March 1981 Premier League	Celtic	7–0	St Mirren	Glasgow
15:00 GMT				Stadium: Celtic Park; Attendance: 18,204

18 March 1981 Premier League	Celtic	4–1	Partick Thistle	Glasgow
19:30 GMT				Stadium: Celtic Park; Attendance: 15,353

21 March 1981 Premier League	Airdrieonians	1–3	Celtic	Airdrie
15:00 GMT				Stadium: Broomfield Park; Attendance: 12,980

28 March 1981 Premier League	Celtic	1–1	Aberdeen	Glasgow
15:00 BST				Stadium: Celtic Park; Attendance: 35,491

1 April 1981 Premier League	Celtic	6–0	Hearts	Glasgow
19:30 BST				Stadium: Celtic Park; Attendance: 13,228

5 April 1981 Premier League	Partick Thistle	0–1	Celtic	Glasgow
15:00 BST				Stadium: Firhill Park; Attendance: 17,224

18 April 1981 Premier League	Rangers	0–1	Celtic	Glasgow
15:00 BST				Stadium: Ibrox Stadium; Attendance: 30,562

22 April 1981 Premier League	Dundee United	2–3	Celtic	Dundee
19:30 BST				Stadium: Tannadice Park; Attendance: 15,349

25 April 1981 Premier League	Celtic	1–1	Kilmarnock	Kilmarnock
15:00 BST				Stadium: Rugby Park; Attendance: 23,050

2 May 1981 Premier League	St Mirren	3–1	Celtic	Paisley
15:00 BST				Stadium: St Mirren Park, Love Street; Attendance: 14,806

=== Scottish Cup ===
24 January 1981 Third round	Berwick Rangers	0–2	Celtic	Berwick
15:00 GMT				Stadium: Shielfield Park; Attendance: 9,676

14 February 1981 Fourth round	Celtic	3–0	Stirling Albion	Glasgow
15:00 GMT				Stadium: Celtic Park; Attendance: 14,200

8 March 1981 Fifth round	Celtic	2–0	East Stirlingshire	Glasgow
15:00 GMT				Stadium: Celtic Park; Attendance: 18,500

11 April 1981 Semi-final	Celtic	0–0	Dundee United	Glasgow
15:00 GMT				Stadium: Hampden Park; Attendance: 40,390

15 April 1981 Semi-final replay	Celtic	2–3	Dundee United	Glasgow
15:00 GMT				Stadium: Hampden Park; Attendance: 32,328

=== Scottish League Cup ===
27 August 1980 Second round 1st leg	Stirling Albion	1–0	Celtic	Stirling
19:30 GMT				Stadium: Annfield Stadium; Attendance: 5,622

30 August 1980 Second round 2nd leg	Celtic	6–1 (6–2 agg.)	Stirling Albion	Glasgow
15:00 GMT				Stadium: Celtic Park; Attendance: 14,654

22 September 1980 Third round 1st leg	Hamilton Academical	1–3	Celtic	Hamilton
19:30 GMT				Stadium: Douglas Park; Attendance: 7,474

24 September 1980 Third round 2nd leg	Celtic	4–1 (6–2 agg.)	Hamilton Academical	Glasgow
19:30 GMT				Stadium: Celtic Park; Attendance: 8,212

8 October 1980 Quarter-final 1st leg	Partick Thistle	0–1	Celtic	Glasgow
19:30 GMT				Stadium: Firhill Park; Attendance: 13,097

20 October 1980 Quarter-final 2nd leg	Celtic	2–1 (3–1 agg.)	Partick Thistle	Glasgow
19:30 GMT				Stadium: Celtic Park; Attendance: 11,053

12 November 1980 Semi-final 1st leg	Dundee United	1–1	Celtic	Dundee
19:30 GMT				Stadium: Tannadice Park; Attendance: 14,517

19 November 1980 Semi-final 2nd leg	Celtic	0–3 (1–4 agg.)	Dundee United	Glasgow
19:30 GMT				Stadium: Celtic Park; Attendance: 19,700

=== European Cup Winners' Cup ===
20 August 1980 1st round 1st leg	Celtic (Scotland)	6–0	(Hungary) Diosgyori VTK	Glasgow
20:00 GMT				Stadium: Celtic Park; Attendance: 28,000

3 September 1980 1st round 2nd leg	Diosgyori VTK (Hungary)	2–1 (2–7 agg.)	(Scotland) Celtic	Miskolc
20:00 GMT				Stadium: Diósgyőri Stadion; Attendance: 8,000

17 September 1980 1st round 1st leg	Celtic (Scotland)	2–1	(Romania) FC Politehnica Timișoara	Glasgow
20:00 GMT				Stadium: Celtic Park; Attendance: 32,000

1 October 1980 1st round 2nd leg	FC Politehnica Timișoara (Romania)	1–0 (2–2 agg.)	(Scotland) Celtic	Timișoara
20:00 GMT				Stadium: Stadionul Dan Păltinișanu; Attendance: 50,000

=== Drybrough Cup ===
26 July 1980 First round	Celtic	0–1	Ayr United	Glasgow
15:00 GMT				Stadium: Celtic Park; Attendance: 16,000

=== Glasgow Cup ===
10 October 1980 Semi-final	Celtic	2–0	Queen's Park	Glasgow
19:30 GMT				Stadium: Celtic Park; Attendance: 2,000

29 April 1981 Final	Partick Thistle	1–0	Celtic	Glasgow
15:00 GMT				Stadium: Firhill Park; Attendance: 5,000

== Club Staff ==
Board of Directors
Position	Name
Chairman	Desmond White
Secretary	Desmond White
Directors	Thomas Devlin James Farrell Kevin Kelly

Football Staff
Position	Name
Manager	Billy McNeill
Assistant manager	John Clark
Reserve Team Manager	Bobby Lennox
Reserve Coach	Jimmy Lumsden
Physio	Brian Scott
Masseur	Jimmy Steele
Kitman	Neil Mochan

== Transfers ==
Transfers Out
Date	Name	To	Transfer Fee
June 1980	(Scotland) Vic Davidson	(United States) Phoenix Inferno	Free
November 1980	(Scotland) Jim Casey	(United States) Phoenix Inferno	Free
January 1981	(Scotland) Alan Sneddon	(Scotland) Hibernian	£60,000
		Total Transfer Fees	£60,000
