= 1976–77 Celtic F.C. season =

Celtic
1976–77 season
- Manager: Jock Stein
- Stadium: Celtic Park
- Scottish Premier Division: 1st
- Scottish Cup: Winners
- Scottish League Cup: Finalists
- UEFA Cup: 1st round

During the 1976–77 Scottish football season, Celtic competed in the Scottish Premier Division.

Celtic won a domestic double as they won both the League by a 9-point margin and the Scottish Cup, defeating Rangers 1-0 in the Final. They narrowly missed on what would have been their third domestic treble as they lost the League Cup Final 1-2 to Aberdeen.

Celtic were eliminated from the UEFA Cup in the first round by Wisla Krakow, 2-4 on aggregate.

== Squad ==
Note: Flags indicate national team as defined under FIFA eligibility rules; some limited exceptions apply. Players may hold more than one non-FIFA nationality.

No.	Pos.	Nation	Player
—	GK	ENG	Peter Latchford
—	GK	SCO	Denis Connaghan
—	GK	ENG	Roy Baines
—	GK	SCO	Graham Barclay
—	DF	SCO	Danny McGrain
—	DF	SCO	Andy Lynch
—	DF	SCO	Pat McCluskey
—	DF	SCO	Roddie MacDonald
—	DF	SCO	Roy Aitken
—	DF	ISL	Jóhannes Eðvaldsson
—	DF	SCO	Pat Stanton
—	MF	SCO	Tommy Callaghan
—	MF	SCO	Brian McLaughlin

No.	Pos.	Nation	Player
—	MF	SCO	Tommy Burns
—	MF	SCO	Ronnie Glavin
—	MF	SCO	Jim Casey
—	MF	SCO	Johnny Doyle
—	MF	SCO	Bobby Hannah
—	MF	ENG	Johnny Gibson
—	MF	SCO	Alfie Conn Jr.
—	FW	SCO	Bobby Lennox
—	FW	SCO	Kenny Dalglish
—	FW	SCO	Paul Wilson
—	FW	SCO	George McCluskey
—	FW	SCO	Atholl Henderson
—	FW	SCO	Joe Craig

== Competitions ==
=== Scottish Premier Division ===
==== League table ====
Pos	Team	Pld	W	D	L	GF	GA	GD	Pts	Qualification or relegation
1	Celtic (C)	36	23	9	4	79	39	+40	55	Qualification for the European Cup first round
2	Rangers	36	18	10	8	62	37	+25	46	Qualification for the Cup Winners' Cup first round
3	Aberdeen	36	16	11	9	56	42	+14	43	Qualification for the UEFA Cup first round
4	Dundee United	36	16	9	11	54	45	+9	41	Qualification for the UEFA Cup first round
5	Partick Thistle	36	11	13	12	40	44	−4	35	

Source: Statto
Rules for classification: 1) points; 2) goal difference; 3) number of goals scored.
(C) Champions

==== Matches ====
4 September 1976 Premier League	Celtic	2–2	Rangers	Glasgow
15:00				Stadium: Celtic Park; Attendance: 54,857

11 September 1976 Premier League	Dundee United	1–0	Celtic	Dundee
15:00				Stadium: Tannadice Park; Attendance: 14,553

18 September 1976 Premier League	Celtic	2–2	Hearts	Glasgow
15:00				Stadium: Celtic Park; Attendance: 26,131

25 September 1976 Premier League	Kilmarnock	0–4	Celtic	Kilmarnock
15:00				Stadium: Rugby Park; Attendance: 14,615

2 October 1976 Premier League	Celtic	1–1	Hibernian	Glasgow
15:00 BST				Stadium: Celtic Park; Attendance: 28,125

16 October 1976 Premier League	Ayr United	0–2	Celtic	Ayr
15:00 BST				Stadium: Somerset Park; Attendance: 12,871

20 October 1976 Premier League	Celtic	5–1	Dundee United	Glasgow
19:30 BST				Stadium: Celtic Park; Attendance: 22,251

23 October 1976 Premier League	Aberdeen	2–1	Celtic	Aberdeen
15:00 BST				Stadium: Pittodrie Stadium; Attendance: 19,370

30 October 1976 Premier League	Celtic	2–0	Motherwell	Glasgow
15:00 BST				Stadium: Celtic Park; Attendance: 29,821

20 November 1976 Premier League	Hearts	3–4	Celtic	Edinburgh
15:00 BST				Stadium: Tynecastle Park; Attendance: 19,975

24 November 1976 Premier League	Rangers	0–1	Celtic	Glasgow
15:00 BST				Stadium: Ibrox Park; Attendance: 45,562

27 November 1976 Premier League	Celtic	2–1	Kilmarnock	Glasgow
15:00 GMT				Stadium: Celtic Park; Attendance: 20,337

18 December 1976 Premier League	Celtic	3–0	Ayr United	Glasgow
15:00 GMT				Stadium: Celtic Park; Attendance: 15,878

26 December 1976 Premier League	Celtic	2–2	Aberdeen	Glasgow
15:00 GMT				Stadium: Celtic Park; Attendance: 46,130

8 January 1977 Premier League	Dundee United	1–2	Celtic	Dundee
15:00 GMT				Stadium: Tannadice Park; Attendance: 15,847

11 January 1977 Premier League	Celtic	1–0	Rangers	Glasgow
19:30 GMT				Stadium: Celtic Park; Attendance: 49,729

22 January 1977 Premier League	Kilmarnock	1–3	Celtic	Kilmarnock
15:00 GMT				Stadium: Rugby Park; Attendance: 14,363

5 February 1977 Premier League	Celtic	4–2	Hibernian	Glasgow
15:00 GMT				Stadium: Celtic Park; Attendance: 27,426

7 February 1977 Premier League	Celtic	5–1	Hearts	Glasgow
15:00 GMT				Stadium: Celtic Park; Attendance: 20,192284

12 February 1977 Premier League	Celtic	2–0	Partick Thistle	Glasgow
15:00 GMT				Stadium: Celtic Park; Attendance: 24,854

19 February 1977 Premier League	Ayr United	2–4	Celtic	Ayr
15:00 GMT				Stadium: Somerset Park; Attendance: 13,529

22 February 1977 Premier League	Partick Thistle	2–4	Celtic	Glasgow
19:30 GMT				Stadium: Firhill Park; Attendance: 14,927

5 March 1977 Premier League	Aberdeen	2–0	Celtic	Aberdeen
15:00 GMT				Stadium: Pittodrie Stadium; Attendance: 21,656

9 March 1977 Premier League	Celtic	2–1	Partick Thistle	Glasgow
19:30 GMT				Stadium: Celtic Park; Attendance: 20,914

16 March 1977 Premier League	Celtic	2–2	Motherwell	Glasgow
19:30 GMT				Stadium: Celtic Park; Attendance: 20,086

19 March 1977 Premier League	Rangers	2–2	Celtic	Glasgow
15:00 GMT				Stadium: Ibrox Park; Attendance: 53,743

26 March 1977 Premier League	Celtic	2–0	Dundee United	Glasgow
15:00 GMT				Stadium: Celtic Park; Attendance: 35,899

30 March 1977 Premier League	Hibernian	1–1	Celtic	Edinburgh
19:30 GMT				Stadium: Easter Road; Attendance: 11,841

2 April 1977 Premier League	Hearts	0–3	Celtic	Edinburgh
15:00 GMT				Stadium: Tynecastle Park; Attendance: 16,801

9 April 1977 Premier League	Celtic	1–0	Kilmarnock	Glasgow
15:00 BST				Stadium: Celtic Park; Attendance: 18,759

13 April 1977 Premier League	Motherwell	3–0	Celtic	Motherwell
19:30 BST				Stadium: Fir Park; Attendance: 13,820

16 April 1977 Premier League	Hibernian	0–1	Celtic	Edinburgh
15:00 BST				Stadium: Easter Road; Attendance: 22,036

20 April 1977 Premier League	Celtic	4–1	Aberdeen	Glasgow
19:30 BST				Stadium: Celtic Park; Attendance: 25,651

23 April 1977 Premier League	Partick Thistle	1–1	Celtic	Glasgow
15:00 BST				Stadium: Firhill Park; Attendance: 15,579

30 April 1977 Premier League	Celtic	2–0	Ayr United	Glasgow
15:00 BST				Stadium: Celtic Park; Attendance: 16,086

10 May 1977 Premier League	Motherwell	2–2	Celtic	Motherwell
19:30 BST				Stadium: Fir Park; Attendance: 8,856

=== Scottish Cup ===
29 January 1977 Third round	Airdrieonians	1–1	Celtic	Airdrie
15:00 GMT				Stadium: Broomfield Park; Attendance: 18,316

2 February 1977 Third round replay	Celtic	5–0	Airdrieonians	Glasgow
19:30 GMT				Stadium: Celtic Park; Attendance: 20,000

27 February 1977 Fourth round	Celtic	1–1	Ayr United	Glasgow
15:00 GMT				Stadium: Celtic Park; Attendance: 38,000

2 March 1977 Fourth round replay	Ayr United	1–3	Celtic	Ayr
19:30 GMT				Stadium: Somerset Park; Attendance: 13,100

13 March 1977 Fifth round	Celtic	5–1	Queen of the South	Glasgow
15:00 GMT				Stadium: Celtic Park; Attendance: 27,000

6 April 1977 Semi-final	Celtic	2–0	Dundee	Glasgow
19:30 GMT				Stadium: Hampden Park; Attendance: 29,870

7 May 1977 Final	Celtic	1–0	Rangers	Glasgow
15:00 GMT				Stadium: Hampden Park; Attendance: 54,037

=== Scottish League Cup ===
14 August 1976 Group 3	Dundee United	0–1	Celtic	Dundee
15:00 GMT				Stadium: Tannadice Park; Attendance: 14,555

18 August 1976 Group 3	Celtic	3–0	Dumbarton	Glasgow
19:30 GMT				Stadium: Celtic Park; Attendance: 14,654

21 August 1976 Group 3	Arbroath	0–5	Celtic	Arbroath
15:00 GMT				Stadium: Gayfield Park; Attendance: 6,826

25 August 1976 Group 3	Dumbarton	3–3	Celtic	Dumbarton
19:30 GMT				Stadium: Boghead Park; Attendance: 6,717

28 August 1976 Group 3	Celtic	2–1	Arbroath	Glasgow
15:00 GMT				Stadium: Celtic Park; Attendance: 15,787

1 September 1976 Group 3	Celtic	1–1	Dundee United	Glasgow
19:30 GMT				Stadium: Celtic Park; Attendance: 13,772

22 September 1976 Quarter-final 1st leg	Albion Rovers	0–1	Celtic	Coatbridge
19:30 GMT				Stadium: Cliftonhill; Attendance: 7,500

6 October 1976 Quarter-final 2nd leg	Celtic	5–0 (6–0 agg.)	Albion Rovers	Glasgow
19:30 GMT				Stadium: Celtic Park; Attendance: 5,723

25 October 1976 Semi-final	Hearts	1–2	Celtic	Glasgow
19:30 GMT				Stadium: Hampden Park; Attendance: 21,816

6 November 1976 Final	Aberdeen	2–1 (aet)	Celtic	Glasgow
15:00 GMT				Stadium: Hampden Park; Attendance: 69,783

=== UEFA Cup ===
15 September 1976 1st round 1st leg	Celtic (Scotland)	2–2	(Poland) Wisla Krakow	Glasgow
20:00 GMT				Stadium: Celtic Park; Attendance: 30,000

29 September 1976 1st round 2nd leg	Wisla Krakow (Poland)	2–0 (4–2 agg.)	(Scotland) Celtic	Kraków
20:00 GMT				Stadium: Stadion Miejski; Attendance: 45,005

=== Glasgow Cup ===
14 May 1977 Semi-final	Clyde	2–4	Celtic	Glasgow
15:00 BST				Stadium: Shawfield Stadium; Attendance: 5,555
