= 1980 Scottish Cup final =

Scottish football match

1980 Scottish Cup Final
- Event: 1979–80 Scottish Cup
Celtic	Rangers
1	0
- After extra time
- Date: 10 May 1980
- Venue: Hampden Park, Glasgow
- Referee: George Smith
- Attendance: 70,303

The 1980 Scottish Cup Final was played on 10 May 1980 at Hampden Park in Glasgow and was the final of the 95th Scottish Cup competition. Old Firm rivals Celtic and Rangers contested the match, which Celtic won 1–0 after extra time when George McCluskey scored the winning goal off a corner. Rioting after the end of the match, involving both sets of supporters, resulted in the sale of alcohol being banned at sporting events in Scotland.

== Match details ==
The match represented a last chance of success in the 1979–80 season for the traditionally dominant Old Firm, as Aberdeen had won the Scottish league championship. Celtic had finished above Rangers in the league, but Rangers went into the match as bookmakers' favourites because Celtic were missing Tom McAdam, Roddie MacDonald and Jim Casey from their lineup due to injury.

Roy Aitken and Mike Conroy were drafted into the Celtic team as makeshift central defenders, but they were effective in nullifying the Rangers attack. There was not much incident in the game, which finished goalless after the regulation 90 minutes. This necessitated an extra time period of 30 minutes, during which Celtic scored the only and therefore winning goal of the match. Danny McGrain took a shot that looked to be heading wide, but George McCluskey redirected the ball past Peter McCloy and into the goal.

10 May 1980

Celtic	1 – 0 (a.e.t.)	Rangers
McCluskey 107'	Report (page 20)

Hampden Park, Glasgow
Attendance: 70,303
Referee: George Smith

=== Teams ===
CELTIC:
GK	1	(England) Peter Latchford
RB	2	(Scotland) Alan Sneddon
LB	3	(Scotland) Danny McGrain (c)
CB	4	(Scotland) Roy Aitken
CB	5	(Scotland) Mike Conroy
MF	6	(Scotland) Murdo MacLeod
RW	7	(Scotland) Davie Provan
MF	8	(Scotland) Johnny Doyle	(substituted off) ?'
FW	9	(Scotland) George McCluskey
MF	10	(Scotland) Tommy Burns
FW	11	(Scotland) Frank McGarvey
Substitutes:
MF	12	(Scotland) Vic Davidson (unused)
MF	13	(Scotland) Bobby Lennox	(substituted on) ?'
Manager:
(Scotland) Billy McNeill

RANGERS:
GK	1	(Scotland) Peter McCloy
RB	2	(Scotland) Sandy Jardine
LB	3	(Scotland) Ally Dawson
CB	4	(Scotland) Tom Forsyth	(substituted off) 112'
CB	5	(Scotland) Colin Jackson
MF	6	(Scotland) Gregor Stevens
LW	7	(Scotland) Davie Cooper
MF	8	(Scotland) Bobby Russell
FW	9	(Scotland) Derek Johnstone (c)
MF	10	(Scotland) Gordon Smith
FW	11	(Scotland) John MacDonald		(substituted off) 62'
Substitutes:
FW	12	(Scotland) Tommy McLean		(substituted on) 62'
MF	14	(Scotland) Alex Miller	(substituted on) 112'
Manager:
(Scotland) John Greig

== Riot ==
The match is also remembered for a riot that followed its conclusion, which BBC News described in 2011 as the "most infamous case of disorder" in an Old Firm match. Rival fans battled on the Hampden Park pitch and mounted police attempted to defuse the trouble, which was largely attributed to the excessive consumption of alcohol.

After winning the match, the Celtic players went to celebrate with their supporters, as was the normal practice. The SFA had given both teams permission to parade the Scottish Cup trophy on the pitch after the match, as they had recently installed a 10-foot (3 m) high perimeter fence around Hampden. Some of the Celtic supporters climbed over the perimeter fences and joined the players on the pitch. An investigation by the SFA executive committee found that this initial invasion of the pitch was "a spontaneous, if misguided, expression of joy."

Some of the Rangers fans had stayed behind, despite their team's defeat. One of the Celtic fans ran to the end of the stadium inhabited by the Rangers fans, and kicked a ball into the goal at that end. In response to this, some Rangers fans invaded the pitch to charge at the Celtic fans, who in turn confronted their rivals. Bricks, bottles and cans were soon being thrown along with fans using iron bars and wooden staves from terracing frames as weapons. The police had insufficient manpower inside the stadium to quell the disorder. Match commentator Archie Macpherson described the riot as follows:

This is like a scene now out of Apocalypse Now ... We've got the equivalent of Passchendaele and that says nothing for Scottish football. At the end of the day, let's not kid ourselves. These supporters hate each other.

Both clubs were fined £20,000 after the events and more than 200 arrests were made in the Hampden area. Celtic blamed Strathclyde Police for their handling of the riot. The vast majority of the police officers on duty were outside the ground after the match, to prevent any trouble in the streets surrounding Hampden Park. The police and the SFA had assumed that the perimeter fences would prevent fans from invading the pitch, but they were later described as being completely inadequate. The police blamed Celtic fans for the disorder, a position Rangers concurred with. In response, Celtic cited the underlying hostility between the two sets of fans, caused by the sectarianism in Glasgow. Celtic chairman Desmond White also cited the fact that Celtic fielded a mixture of Catholics and Protestants in their team, implying that the problem was not caused by his club.

George Younger, the Secretary of State for Scotland, blamed alcohol and the actions of the Celtic players for the riot. An Act of Parliament was passed that banned the sale of alcoholic beverages within Scottish sports grounds. The ban was partially lifted in 2007 by Cabinet Secretary for Justice Kenny MacAskill, to allow the sale of alcohol at international rugby union matches played at Murrayfield Stadium. The Scottish Rugby Union had lobbied the Scottish Parliament for the law to be changed, as they believed that they had lost out on the right to host the 2003 Challenge Cup Final due to it. Subsequent to the easing of the ban, Motherwell chairman John Boyle called for it to be lifted entirely. Ahead of the 2011 Scottish League Cup Final, it was reported by the Scotland On Sunday that VIP hospitality packages could be purchased allowing "unlimited" consumption of alcohol at bars within Hampden Park. These transactions do not contravene the legislation because the sale of alcohol is still permitted in hospitality areas with no direct sight of the pitch.

== See also ==
- Sectarianism in Glasgow
