= 1984 Scottish Cup final =

1984 Scottish Cup Final
- Event: 1983–84 Scottish Cup
Aberdeen	Celtic
2	1
- (a.e.t.)
- Date: 19 May 1984
- Venue: Hampden Park, Glasgow
- Referee: Bob Valentine
- Attendance: 58,900

The 1984 Scottish Cup Final was played on 19 May 1984 at Hampden Park in Glasgow and was the final of the 99th Scottish Cup. The previous year's winners and defending champions in the match were Aberdeen who had beaten Rangers in the 1983 final. Aberdeen had beaten Dundee 2–0 in their semi-final to reach the final whereas Celtic had beaten St Mirren 2–1. The holders, Aberdeen and Celtic, contested the match; Aberdeen won the match 2–1, their goals were scored by Eric Black and Mark McGhee. This marked three consecutive Scottish Cup wins for Aberdeen.

== Match details ==
19 May 1984

Aberdeen	2 – 1 (a.e.t.)	Celtic
Eric Black 23'; Mark McGhee 98'	Report (page 15)	Paul McStay 86'

Hampden Park, Glasgow
Attendance: 58,900
Referee: Bob Valentine

ABERDEEN:
GK	(Scotland) Jim Leighton
DF	(Scotland) Stewart McKimmie
DF	(Scotland) Alex McLeish
DF	(Scotland) Willie Miller (c)
DF	(Scotland) Doug Rougvie	(substituted off) ?'
MF	(Scotland) Gordon Strachan
MF	(Scotland) Neale Cooper
MF	(Scotland) Neil Simpson
MF	(Scotland) Peter Weir	(substituted off) ?'
FW	(Scotland) Eric Black
FW	(Scotland) Mark McGhee
Substitutes:
MF	(Scotland) Billy Stark	(substituted on) ?'
MF	(Scotland) Dougie Bell	(substituted on) ?'
Manager:
(Scotland) Alex Ferguson

CELTIC:
GK	(Republic of Ireland) Pat Bonner
DF	(Scotland) Danny McGrain (c)
DF	(Scotland) Willie McStay
DF	(Scotland) Roy Aitken	(red card) 39 min
DF	(Scotland) Mark Reid	(substituted off) ?'
MF	(Scotland) Davie Provan
MF	(Scotland) Paul McStay	(substituted off) ?'
MF	(Scotland) Murdo MacLeod
MF	(Scotland) Tommy Burns
FW	(Scotland) Brian McClair
FW	(Scotland) Frank McGarvey
Substitutes:
DF	(Scotland) Graeme Sinclair	(substituted on) ?'
FW	(Scotland) Jim Melrose	(substituted on) ?'
Manager:
(Scotland) David Hay

== Road to the final ==
Aberdeen				Round	Celtic				
Home team	Score	Away team	Aberdeen scorer(s)	Round	Home team	Score	Away team	Celtic scorer(s)	
Aberdeen	2 – 0	Dundee	Ian Porteous 28'; Gordon Strachan 89'	Semi-finals	Celtic	2 – 1	St Mirren	Brian McClair 29'; Paul McStay 81'	'
