= 1985 Scottish Cup final =

1985 Scottish Cup Final
- Match programme cover
- Event: 1984–85 Scottish Cup
Dundee United	Celtic
1	2
- Date: 18 May 1985
- Venue: Hampden Park, Glasgow
- Referee: Brian McGinlay
- Attendance: 60,346

The 1985 Scottish Cup Final was played on 18 May 1985 at Hampden Park in Glasgow and was the final of the 100th season of the Scottish Cup. The previous winners were Aberdeen, who had beaten Celtic in the 1984 final, but they were knocked out by Dundee United at the Semi-final stage. The Final was contested by Celtic and Dundee United. Celtic won the match 2–1, thanks to a free kick scored by Davie Provan and a late diving header from Frank McGarvey.

== Match ==
The first half was a tame affair, with neither Pat Bonner or Hamish McAlpine been required to make a save of note. Dundee United opened the scoring on 53 minutes; Eamonn Bannon passed to David Dodds who controlled the ball whilst holding off a challenge, then slipped the ball to Stuart Beedie who fired a low shot past Bonner's left hand into the corner of the goal. Trailing to Dundee United, Celtic manager Davie Hay make a tactical change in the second half by pushing Roy Aitken forward from central defence into midfield. The move proved a success as Aitken's presence in midfield began to galvanise Celtic. A virtuoso free-kick from Davie Provan in 77 minutes equalised the earlier goal from Dundee Utd's Beedie, only the third occasion that a goal had been scored direct from a free-kick in a Scottish Cup Final. Five minutes from the end, a driving run and cross from down the right by Aitken set up a diving header from Frank McGarvey to win the game for Celtic.

Roy Aitken, who had been sent off in the previous year's final, won the Man of the Match Award.

Celtic and Dundee United would again meet in the final three years later, when Celtic would once again come from a goal down to beat United by two goals to one.

== Details ==
18 May 1985

Dundee United	1 – 2	Celtic
Stuart Beedie 55'	Report (page 18)	Davie Provan 77'; Frank McGarvey 84'

Hampden Park, Glasgow
Attendance: 60,346
Referee: Brian McGinlay

DUNDEE UNITED:
GK	1	(Scotland) Hamish McAlpine
DF	2	(Scotland) Maurice Malpas
MF	3	(Scotland) Stuart Beedie		(substituted off) 78'
DF	4	(Scotland) Richard Gough
DF	5	(Scotland) Paul Hegarty (c)
DF	6	(Scotland) David Narey
MF	7	(Scotland) Eamonn Bannon
MF	8	(Scotland) Ralph Milne
MF	9	(Scotland) Billy Kirkwood	(yellow card) 39'
FW	10	(Scotland) Paul Sturrock
FW	11	(Scotland) Davie Dodds
Substitutes:
DF	12	(Scotland) John Holt		(substituted on) 78'
FW	14	(Republic of Ireland) Tommy Coyne
Manager:
(Scotland) Jim McLean

CELTIC:
GK	1	(Republic of Ireland) Pat Bonner
DF	2	(Scotland) Willie McStay	(yellow card) 73'
DF	3	(Scotland) Danny McGrain (c)	(yellow card) 85'
DF	4	(Scotland) Roy Aitken
DF	5	(Scotland) Tom McAdam
MF	6	(Scotland) Murdo MacLeod
MF	7	(Scotland) Davie Provan
MF	8	(Scotland) Paul McStay		(substituted off) 75'
FW	9	(Scotland) Mo Johnston
MF	10	(Scotland) Tommy Burns		(substituted off) 65'
FW	11	(Scotland) Frank McGarvey
Substitutes:
DF	12	(Republic of Ireland) Pierce O'Leary		(substituted on) 75'
FW	13	(Scotland) Brian McClair		(substituted on) 65'
Manager:
(Scotland) David Hay

Man of the Match:
(Scotland) Roy Aitken (Celtic)

Match officials

- Referee:
  - Brian McGinlay
- Linesmen:
  - ??
  - ??

Match rules

- 90 minutes.
- 30 minutes of extra time if necessary.
- Match replayed if scores still level.
