= Alan Sneddon =

Scottish footballer

Personal information
- Date of birth: 12 March 1958 (age 68)
- Place of birth: Baillieston, Glasgow, Scotland
- Position: Defender

Youth career
- 1975–1977: Larkhall Thistle

Senior career*
Years	Team	Apps	(Gls)
1977–1981	Celtic	98	(1)
1981–1992	Hibernian	312	(7)
1992–1993	Motherwell	16	(0)
1993–1996	East Fife	71	(4)
Total		497	(12)

International career
1978	Scotland U21	1	(0)
- * Club domestic league appearances and goals

Alan Sneddon (born 12 March 1958) is a Scottish former footballer, who played as a defender for Celtic, Hibernian, Motherwell and East Fife in the Scottish Football League. Typically deployed as a right-back or overlapping wing back, Sneddon made over 400 appearances and won league and cup honours with both Celtic and Hibernian, and was a Scotland under-21 international.

== Early career ==
Sneddon was born in Ballieston in 1958 and joined Scottish Junior club Larkhall Thistle as a part-time player whilst undertaking an engineering apprenticeship. After an injury to Danny McGrain meant that Celtic required cover in the right-back position, manager Jock Stein signed Sneddon for Celtic in August 1977 and he made his debut in a friendly match against Ayr United at Somerset Park in January 1978, which Celtic won 5-0. Sneddon's competitive debut for Celtic came in a Scottish Cup match against Dundee in February 1978, in which he provided two assists for George McCluskey in a 7-1 Celtic victory.

== Celtic ==
In a four-year Celtic career, Sneddon scored his only goal for the club in a 2-2 draw against Rangers in August 1979. He made his European debut for Celtic in Albania in September 1979, against Partizani Tirana in the first round of the 1979-80 European Cup. Celtic lost the first leg in the Qemal Stafa Stadium with a goal from Agim Murati giving Partizani a 1-0 win, but despite Sneddon's early headed own goal in the second leg at Celtic Park, which came after a mix-up with Celtic goalkeeper Peter Latchford, Celtic won the tie 4-1, and 4-2 on aggregate.

After defeating Dundalk in the next round, Celtic reached the European Cup Quarter Final that season, losing 3-2 on aggregate against Real Madrid. In the home leg of the tie at Celtic Park, Sneddon provided the assists from the right back position for both of Celtic's goals in a 2-0 victory. Celtic's first goal came after Sneddon had taken the ball past Madrid defender José Antonio Camacho and struck a shot from the corner of the penalty area. Although Real Madrid goalkeeper Mariano García Remón saved the shot, he was unable to hold the ball, and it was put into the net by George McCluskey. Celtic's second came from a header by Johnny Doyle, who got between defenders Andrés Sabido and Pirri to convert Sneddon’s cross.

Sneddon won the 1980 Scottish Cup Final with Celtic, and earned the unusual achievement of winning two league winners' medals in the same season in 1981, as he played enough games for both Celtic, who won the Premier Division, and Hibernian, who won the First Division, to qualify for a medal from each championship. Although entitled to the Premier League medal, he revealed in an interview in 2020 that he did not receive the medal from Celtic.

== Hibernian and later career ==
The emergence of Mark Reid at Celtic, together with Danny McGrain's return from injury saw Sneddon's Celtic appearances limited in the 1980-81 season, and in January 1981 he was signed for Hibernian by their manager, former Celtic player and Lisbon Lion Bertie Auld, for a fee of £60,000. Over an 11-year career with Hibernian, Sneddon played in over 300 league games. This long service meant that he was awarded a testimonial match, which was played against Aston Villa in 1991. He had a short stint with Mothwewell between 1992 and 1993, before playing over 70 matches for East Fife and then retiring from the game in 1996.

== International appearances ==
Sneddon was capped by Scotland at Under-21 level in a 3-1 victory over the United States at Pittodrie Stadium in September 1978.

== Post-playing career ==
In addition to some appearances as a match analyst for Celtic TV, Sneddon has undertaken work in disability and autism support, including organising inclusive sport and helping develop services for autistic people with complex support needs.

== Honours ==
Celtic

- Scottish League Championship: 1978–79, 1980–81
- Scottish Cup: 1979–80

Hibernian

- Scottish First Division: 1980–81
