= 1982 Scottish League Cup final =

- Event: 1982–83 Scottish League Cup
Celtic	Rangers
2	1
- Date: 4 December 1982
- Venue: Hampden Park, Glasgow
- Attendance: 55,372

The 1982 Scottish League Cup final was played on 4 December 1982, at Hampden Park in Glasgow and was the final of the 37th Scottish League Cup competition. The final was contested by the Old Firm rivals, Celtic and Rangers. Celtic won the match 2–1 thanks to goals by Charlie Nicholas and Murdo MacLeod. Rangers goal was scored by Jim Bett.

== Match details ==
4 December 1982
15:00

Celtic	2–1	Rangers
Nicholas 23'; McLeod 31'		Bett 46'

Hampden Park, Glasgow
Attendance: 55,372
Referee: Kenny Hope

CELTIC:
GK	1	Packie Bonner
DF	2	Danny McGrain (c)
DF	3	Graeme Sinclair
DF	4	Roy Aitken
DF	5	Tom McAdam
MF	6	Murdo MacLeod
MF	7	Davie Provan
MF	8	Paul McStay	(substituted off) ?'
FW	9	Frank McGarvey
MF	10	Tommy Burns
FW	11	Charlie Nicholas
Substitutes:
?	?	Mark Reid	(substituted on) ?'
?	?
Manager:
Billy McNeill

RANGERS:
GK	1	Jim Stewart
DF	2	Dave MacKinnon
DF	3	Ian Redford
DF	4	John McClelland
DF	5	Craig Paterson
MF	6	Jim Bett
MF	7	Davie Cooper
MF	8	Robert Prytz	(substituted off) ?'
FW	9	Derek Johnstone (c)
MF	10	Bobby Russell	(substituted off) ?'
FW	11	Gordon Smith
Substitutes:
MF	?	Ally Dawson	(substituted on) ?'
FW	?	John MacDonald	(substituted on) ?'
Manager:
John Greig
