= 1980–81 Scottish Cup =

Tournament details
- Country: Scotland

Final positions
- Champions: Rangers
- Runners-up: Dundee United

The 1980–81 Scottish Cup was the 96th staging of Scotland's most prestigious football knockout competition. The Cup was won by Rangers who defeated Dundee United in the replayed final.

== First round ==
Home team	Score	Away team
Alloa Athletic (3)	1 – 1	Stenhousemuir (3)
Brechin City (3)	2 – 1	Keith (HL)
East Fife (3)	2 – 1	Civil Service Strollers (ESL)
Meadowbank Thistle (3)	2 – 2	Buckie Thistle (HL)
Queen's Park (3)	2 – 2	Montrose (3)
Whitehill Welfare (ESL)	1 – 1	Hawick Royal Albert (SSL)

=== Replays ===
Home team	Score	Away team
Buckie Thistle (HL)	3 – 2	Meadowbank Thistle (3)
Hawick Royal Albert (SSL)	4 – 1	Whitehill Welfare (ESL)
Montrose (3)	2 – 0	Queen's Park (3)
Stenhousemuir (3)	3 – 2	Alloa Athletic (3)

== Second round ==
Home team	Score	Away team
Albion Rovers (3)	1 – 1	Arbroath (3)
Queen of the South (3)	1 – 2	East Fife (3)
Forfar Athletic (3)	0 – 2	Brechin City (3)
Hawick Royal Albert (SSL)	2 – 2	Cowdenbeath (3)
Inverness Thistle (HL)	2 – 0	Montrose (3)
Rothes (HL)	1 – 5	Clyde (3)
Stenhousemuir (3)	0 – 0	Spartans (ESL)
Stranraer (3)	2 – 2	Buckie Thistle (HL)

=== Replays ===
Home team	Score	Away team
Arbroath (3)	1 – 0	Albion Rovers (3)
Cowdenbeath (3)	3 – 0	Hawick Royal Albert (SSL)
Buckie Thistle (HL)	3 – 2	Stranraer (3)
Spartans (ESL)	1 – 2	Stenhousemuir (3)

== Third round ==
Home team	Score	Away team
Airdrieonians (1)	0 – 5	Rangers (1)
Arbroath (3)	1 – 1	Cowdenbeath (3)
Berwick Rangers (2)	0 – 2	Celtic (1)
Brechin City (3)	1 – 2	Dundee United (1)
Buckie Thistle (HL)	1 – 3	Stirling Albion (2)
East Fife (3)	0 – 0	Clydebank (2)
East Stirlingshire (2)	4 – 1	Inverness Thistle (HL)
Falkirk (2)	1 – 0	Dundee (2)
Hamilton Academical (2)	0 – 3	St Johnstone (2)
Hibernian (2)	1 – 1	Dunfermline Athletic (2)
Kilmarnock (1)	2 – 1	Ayr United (2)
Greenock Morton (1)	0 – 0	Hearts (1)
Partick Thistle (1)	2 – 2	Clyde (3)
Raith Rovers (2)	1 – 2	Aberdeen (1)
St Mirren (1)	0 – 2	Dumbarton (2)
Stenhousemuir (3)	1 – 1	Motherwell (2)

=== Replays ===
Home team	Score	Away team
Clyde (3)	2 – 4	Partick Thistle (1)
Clydebank (2)	5 – 4	East Fife (3)
Cowdenbeath (3)	4 – 0	Arbroath (3)
Dunfermline Athletic (2)	1 – 2	Hibernian (2)
Hearts (1)	1 – 3	Greenock Morton (1)
Motherwell (2)	2 – 1	Stenhousemuir (3)

== Fourth round ==
Home team	Score	Away team
Celtic (1)	3 – 0	Stirling Albion (2)
Cowdenbeath (3)	1 – 2	East Stirlingshire (2)
Dundee United (1)	1 – 0	Partick Thistle (1)
Hibernian (2)	1 – 0	Falkirk (2)
Kilmarnock (1)	0 – 0	Clydebank (2)
Greenock Morton (1)	1 – 0	Aberdeen (1)
Motherwell (2)	2 – 1	Dumbarton (2)
St Johnstone (2)	3 – 3	Rangers (1)

=== Replays ===
Home team	Score	Away team
Clydebank (2)	1 – 1	Kilmarnock (1)
Rangers (1)	3 – 1	St Johnstone (2)

==== Second Replay ====
Home team	Score	Away team
Kilmarnock (1)	0 – 1	Clydebank (2)

== Quarter-finals ==
Home team	Score	Away team
Greenock Morton (1)	0 – 0	Clydebank (2)
Celtic (1)	2 – 0	East Stirlingshire (2)
Dundee United (1)	6 – 1	Motherwell (2)
Rangers (1)	3 – 1	Hibernian (2)

=== Replay ===
Home team	Score	Away team
Clydebank (2)	0 – 6	Greenock Morton (1)

== Semi-finals ==
11 April 1981

Celtic	0–0	Dundee United

Hampden Park, Glasgow
Attendance: 40,337

11 April 1981

Rangers	2–1	Morton

Celtic Park, Glasgow
Attendance: 27,050

=== Replay ===
15 April 1981

Dundee United	3–2	Celtic
Eamonn Bannon 9'; Paul Hegarty 10'; Mike Conroy 76' (o.g.)		Charlie Nicholas 5' (pen.); Charlie Nicholas

Hampden Park, Glasgow
Attendance: 32,328

== Final ==
9 May 1981

Rangers	0–0 (a.e.t.)	Dundee United

Hampden Park, Glasgow
Attendance: 53,000
Referee: Ian Foote

=== Replay ===
12 May 1981

Rangers	4–1	Dundee United
Cooper 10'; Russell 21'; MacDonald 29', 77'		Dodds 23'

Hampden Park, Glasgow
Attendance: 43,099
Referee: Ian Foote

== See also ==
- 1980–81 in Scottish football
- 1980–81 Scottish League Cup
