= Desmond White =

Desmond White may refer to:

- Des White (born 1927), New Zealand rugby league footballer
- Desmond White (footballer) (1911–1985), Scottish amateur football goalkeeper
