= Andy Ritchie (Scottish footballer) =

Scottish footballer (born 1956)

Personal information
- Full name: Andrew Ritchie
- Date of birth: 23 February 1956 (age 70)
- Place of birth: Bellshill, Scotland
- Position: Forward

Senior career*
Years	Team	Apps	(Gls)
1973–1976	Celtic	9	(1)
1976–1983	Morton	213	(100)
1983–1984	Motherwell	8	(1)
1984	Clydebank	1	(0)
1984	East Stirlingshire	1	(0)
1984–1985	Albion Rovers	6	(2)

International career
1979	Scotland under-21	1	(0)
1980	Scottish League XI	1	(0)

Managerial career
- 1984–1985: Albion Rovers (player/manager)
- * Club domestic league appearances and goals

Andrew Ritchie (born 23 February 1956) is a Scottish retired professional footballer. His career spanned twelve years and six clubs. He began at Celtic in 1973, making nine league appearances and scoring one goal in three years. In 1976, he joined Morton, for whom he made 213 league appearances and scored 100 goals. He then played for four clubs in two years―Motherwell, Clydebank, East Stirlingshire and Albion Rovers (as player/manager)―before retiring.

== Career at Morton ==
Born in Bellshill, as a teenager Ritchie had trials with Manchester United, Coventry City, Everton, Middlesbrough and Rangers, but chose to join Celtic in 1971, aged 15. Soon after, Ritchie was 'farmed' out to Junior side Kirkintilloch Rob Roy. At Celtic, Ritchie had numerous disagreements with manager Jock Stein, which led to his transfer to Morton. As part of the transfer, Morton goalkeeper Roy Baines joined Celtic in exchange for Ritchie and a payment of £10,000.

Ritchie is most famous for his seven years at Greenock side Morton, during which he scored 118 goals. He was revered by the club's fans and earned the nicknames "the King of Cappielow Park" and "The Idle Idol". He made his debut for Morton on 28 October 1976 and scored 133 goals in 246 games for the club. He was the top scorer in the Premier Division in 1978–79.

Ritchie was famous for what, by the standard of most professional footballers, was a rotund build and apparently blase demeanour. Scottish football journalist Chick Young saw Ritchie as "the epitome of the Scottish footballer – a fat, lazy bastard, but with great ball skill".

Whilst at Morton, Ritchie won a solitary cap for the Scotland national under-21 football team as an overage player, against Belgium. He had a falling out with Scotland manager Jock Stein about, as Ritchie felt, having been strung along. He was never selected again.

== Career after Morton ==
Ritchie was transferred from Morton to Motherwell in 1983. He was player-manager for Albion Rovers in season 1984–85. He retired in 1985, aged 28. Later, he took up a coaching and scouting role for Celtic and subsequent scouting roles for Aston Villa and Manchester City. He became an official SPL match observer. A biography, The King of Cappielow was published on 11 October 2008.

== Awards ==
Ritchie received the Scottish Football Writers' Association Footballer of the Year award in 1979. In common with the rest of his teammates at Scottish Premier Division club Greenock Morton, he was a part-time footballer. On the day of the award ceremony Ritchie worked a shift in his other job laying tar as a road surfacer.

In 2005, he was voted 'cult hero' in an internet poll for the BBC television's Football Focus programme, receiving 64 per cent of votes cast for Morton players.
