= 1985 Rous Cup =

Scotland	England
(Scotland)	(England)
1	0
- Date: 25 May
- Venue: Hampden Park, Glasgow
- Referee: Michel Vautrot (France)
- Attendance: 66,439

The 1985 Rous Cup was the first staging of the Rous Cup international football competition, initially established to continue the then-traditional annual game between rivals England and Scotland following the demise of the British Home Championship.

Scotland won the cup by beating England 1–0 in the match played on 25 May 1985. Richard Gough scored the only goal of the game, a header in the 69th minute. This was to be the only time they lifted the Rous Cup during its five-year existence.

== Match details ==
25 May 1985
15:00 BST

Scotland	1–0	England
Gough 69'	Report (Page 15)

Hampden Park, Glasgow
Attendance: 66,439
Referee: Michel Vautrot (France)

Scotland
England

GK	1	Jim Leighton (Aberdeen)
DF	2	Richard Gough (Dundee United)
DF	3	Maurice Malpas (Dundee United)	Booked
MF	5	Roy Aitken (Celtic)
DF	4	Alex McLeish (Aberdeen)
DF	6	Willie Miller (Aberdeen)
MF	7	Gordon Strachan (Manchester United)
MF	9	Graeme Souness (Sampdoria) (c)
FW	10	Steve Archibald (Barcelona)	Booked
MF	8	Jim Bett (Lokeren)
FW	11	David Speedie (Chelsea)		(substituted off) 71'
Substitututes:
GK	12	Alan Rough (Hibernian)
MF	15	Paul McStay (Celtic)
MF	16	Murdo MacLeod (Celtic)		(substituted on) 71'
FW	17	Mo Johnston (Celtic)
FW	14	Paul Sturrock (Dundee United)
Manager:
(Scotland) Jock Stein

GK	1	Peter Shilton (Southampton)
DF	2	Viv Anderson (Arsenal)
DF	3	Kenny Sansom (Arsenal)
DF	4	Terry Fenwick (Queen's Park Rangers)
DF	5	Terry Butcher (Ipswich Town)
MF	10	Glenn Hoddle (Tottenham Hotspur)		(substituted off) 79'
MF	6	Ray Wilkins (Milan)	Booked
MF	7	Bryan Robson (Manchester United) (c)
FW	8	Trevor Francis (Sampdoria)
FW	9	Mark Hateley (Milan)
MF	11	John Barnes (Watford)		(substituted off) 63'
Substitututes:
GK	12	Gary Bailey (Manchester United)
DF	14	Dave Watson (Norwich City)
MF	16	Chris Waddle (Newcastle United)		(substituted on) 63'
FW	15	Kerry Dixon (Chelsea)
FW	17	Gary Lineker (Leicester City)		(substituted on) 79'
Manager:
(England) Bobby Robson

Match rules:

- 90 minutes
- Penalty shoot-out if scores still level
- Five substitutes named, of which two may be used
