= Roy Aitken =

Scottish footballer and manager (born 1958)

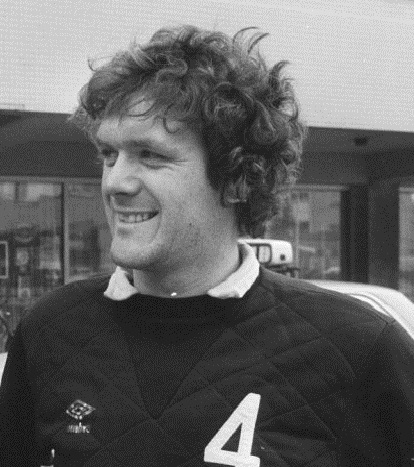
- Aitken in September 1982

Personal information
- Full name: Robert Sime Aitken
- Date of birth: 24 November 1958 (age 67)
- Place of birth: Irvine, North Ayrshire, Scotland
- Height: 1.83 m (6 ft 0 in)
- Position: Defender

Youth career
- 1973–1975: Celtic

Senior career*
Years	Team	Apps	(Gls)
1975–1990	Celtic	484	(40)
1990–1991	Newcastle United	54	(1)
1991–1992	St Mirren	34	(1)
1992–1995	Aberdeen	29	(2)
Total		601	(44)

International career
1976–1984	Scotland U21	16	(2)
1979–1991	Scotland	57	(1)
1990	SFA (SFL Centenary)	1	(0)

Managerial career
- 1995–1997: Aberdeen
- 2006: Aston Villa (caretaker)
- * Club domestic league appearances and goals

Robert Sime "Roy" Aitken (born 24 November 1958) is a Scottish former football player and manager. He made over 480 league appearances for Celtic, and later played for Newcastle United, St Mirren and Aberdeen. Aitken also made 57 international appearances for Scotland. His playing position was either in midfield or defence.

Aitken had become assistant manager at Aberdeen towards the end of his playing career, and was appointed their manager in February 1995. He led the Dons to a Scottish League Cup win in 1995–96, but was sacked in November 1997. He has since coached several clubs, including Leeds United and Aston Villa.

== Playing career ==
Born in Irvine, Ayrshire, Aitken grew up in Ardrossan. He signed for Celtic as a youngster at 16 and came through their youth ranks. Aitken was nicknamed The Bear by their supporters due to his large frame and commanding presence. Aitken broke into the Celtic first team as a teenager, first captaining the team in October 1977. Playing as a centre back or defensive midfielder, Aitken made the third-most appearances in the club's history and was particularly noted for his contributions in the club's double-winning 1987–88 season.

Aitken later went on to play for Newcastle United, joining the club for £500,000 in January 1990. He captained the side in an ultimately unsuccessful attempt to gain promotion from the Second Division. Having been signed by Jim Smith, he was deemed surplus to requirements when Smith was replaced as manager by Ossie Ardiles and returned to Scotland with St Mirren. He did not remain long at St Mirren, signing for Aberdeen for £100,000 to act as player-assistant manager to Willie Miller.

Aitken won 57 caps for the Scotland national football team, scoring once. He featured at both the 1986 and 1990 World Cups, captaining Scotland at the latter tournament and in 27 of his international appearances.

== Management and coaching career ==
Aitken was appointed manager of Aberdeen in February 1995 after the sacking of Willie Miller. At the time, Aberdeen were struggling to avoid relegation, and Aitken made a bright start by winning 2–0 against Rangers in his first game as manager, but then lost to part-time Stenhousemuir in the Scottish Cup by the same scoreline. Aberdeen finished second bottom of the league, but maintained their top league status by defeating Dunfermline Athletic in a two-legged play-off.

The following season saw Aitken invest heavily in the transfer market; signing striker Dean Windass for £750,000 and midfielder Paul Bernard for a club record £1 million. Bernard struggled to justify his expensive transfer fee whilst Windass' time at Pittodrie was hampered by his on-field indiscipline. Nevertheless, Aitken led Aberdeen to silverware when they won the Scottish League Cup on 26 November 1995, beating Dundee 2–0 in the final.

On being sacked by Aberdeen in November 1997 (after a 5–0 loss to Dundee United), Aitken turned his attention to coaching. In February 1998 he was appointed head coach of the Maldives national football team but resigned a month later over the poor facilities available to the team. After obtaining his UEFA Pro Licence at the Scottish Football Association's Largs training centre, Aitken went on to become a coach with Leeds United before rejoining former Leeds coach David O'Leary at Aston Villa.

On 20 July 2006, he was named caretaker manager of Aston Villa after O'Leary's departure the previous evening. Aitken managed Villa to three pre-season victories before being replaced by Martin O'Neill.

In January 2007, he was appointed as one of Alex McLeish's assistants with the Scotland national football team. On 28 November 2007, he followed McLeish, newly appointed as manager of Birmingham City, to the club as first-team coach alongside Andy Watson.

In July 2010, Aitken left Birmingham City to join David O'Leary in Dubai with Al-Ahli. Afterwards taking up the role as Director of Football at Al-Ahli.

== Statistics ==
=== International appearances ===
Scotland national team
Year	Apps	Goals
1979	2	0
1980	3	0
1981	—	
1982	1	0
1983	4	0
1984	1	0
1985	6	0
1986	9	1
1987	8	0
1988	8	0
1989	8	0
1990	6	0
1991	1	0
Total	57	1

== Honours ==
=== Player ===
Celtic

- Scottish Premier Division (6): 1976–77, 1978–79, 1980–81, 1981–82, 1985–86, 1987–88
- Scottish Cup (5): 1977, 1980, 1985, 1988, 1989
- Scottish League Cup: 1982–83

Scotland

- The Rous Cup: 1985

=== Manager ===
Aberdeen

- Scottish League Cup: 1995–96

=== Individual honours ===
- Scottish FA International Roll of Honour: 1989
- Scottish Football Hall of Fame inductee: 2018

== See also ==
- List of footballers in Scotland by number of league appearances (500+)
- List of Scotland national football team captains
