= Jim Casey (footballer) =

Scottish footballer (born 1957)

Personal information
- Date of birth: 2 August 1957 (age 69)
- Place of birth: Glasgow, Scotland
- Position: Midfielder

Senior career*
Years	Team	Apps	(Gls)
1975–1980	Celtic	11	(0)
1980	Phoenix Inferno (indoor)	3	(0)
1980–1983	Arbroath	32	(1)

International career
1978	Scotland U21	1	(0)
- * Club domestic league appearances and goals

Jim Casey (born 2 August 1957 in Glasgow) is a Scottish retired football midfielder. He spent eight seasons in Scotland and part of one season in the United States.

Originally a schoolboy signing with Celtic, Casey signed a professional contract with the team in May 1974. He made his Celtic first team debut in the 1-0 League Cup win at home to Stenhousemuir on 24 September 1975. He saw little first team time until the 1977–78 season. That year, Casey was given his break at sweeper after an injury to Pat Stanton. He was impressive against Motherwell at Fir Park in a 4–2 win in the League Cup on 3 September 1977 but seven days later Celtic blew a two-goal lead against Rangers in a league game at Ibrox to lose 3-2 and Casey again found himself out of favour.

After Billy McNeill's arrival in 1978, Casey re-entered the first team until disaster struck on 13 December 1978 against Rangers in a League Cup semi-final. With the game tied at 2-2, Casey came on for the injured Mike Conroy. At 113 minutes, Roy Baines blocked a Derek Johnstone shot. The ball rebounded, struck Casey and rolled into the net for an own goal. It was Celtic's first League Cup defeat against Rangers since the 1964 final. Casey returned to the reserves and during the 1979–1980 season, he the team, scoring against Morton in 2-0 Scottish Cup victory on 8 March 1980. Casey was earmarked for a place in the 1980 Scottish Cup Final to replace the suspended Tom McAdam, but an injury in training stopped any hopes he had.

Capable of playing both as a sweeper or as a holding midfielder the former Scotland schoolboy international was never able to hold down a regular first team starting spot and he eventually left Celtic for U.S. indoor side Phoenix Inferno of the Major Indoor Soccer League in November 1980. However, he lasted only a few weeks before he was back in Scotland with Arbroath. He retired in 1983.
