= Frank McGarvey =

Scottish footballer (1956–2023)

Personal information
- Full name: Francis Peter McGarvey
- Date of birth: 17 March 1956
- Place of birth: Glasgow, Scotland
- Date of death: 1 January 2023 (aged 66)
- Position: Forward

Youth career
- Colston Y.C.
- 1974–1975: Kilsyth Rangers

Senior career*
| Years | Team | Apps | (Gls) |
| 1975–1979 | St Mirren | 132 | (52) |
| 1979–1980 | Liverpool | 0 | (0) |
| 1980–1985 | Celtic | 245 | (100) |
| 1985–1990 | St Mirren | 134 | (20) |
| 1990–1991 | Queen of the South | 19 | (2) |
| 1991–1993 | Clyde | 46 | (22) |
| 1993–1995 | Shotts Bon Accord | | |
| 1997–1998 | Troon | | |
| Total | | 499 | (196) |

International career
| 1978 | Scottish League XI | 1 | (0) |
| 1979–1984 | Scotland | 7 | (0) |

Managerial career
- 1990–1991: Queen of the South
- * Club domestic league appearances and goals

Francis Peter McGarvey (17 March 1956 – 1 January 2023) was a Scottish professional footballer who played as a forward, mostly for Celtic and St Mirren. He also played seven times in international matches for Scotland.

== Career ==
McGarvey was born in Glasgow on 17 March 1956. He was signed from Colston Y.C. by Kilsyth Rangers for the start of the 1974–75 season. He finished the season as top scorer with 21 goals. He was signed by Alex Ferguson for St Mirren after a tip off from Willie Thornton the ex-Rangers player and assistant manager. He made his debut for St Mirren on 26 April 1975 and soon became a first team regular, scoring 17 times in the 1976–77 season and helping the club win the Scottish First Division.

McGarvey's form attracted the attention of Bob Paisley and, in May 1979, McGarvey signed for Liverpool for £270,000. His tenure with the club lasted ten months. Unable to break into the first team, he sought a transfer. Liverpool accepted a bid of £270,000 by Celtic in March 1980, and for a short time McGarvey became Scotland's most expensive footballer.

McGarvey played 245 times for Celtic over five years, scoring 113 goals. In that time he won two League Championships, two Scottish Cups and a Scottish League Cup; however, Celtic manager David Hay had decided that Mo Johnston and Brian McClair would be his preferred forwards for the 1985–86 season and decided not to offer a contract extension to McGarvey. In his final game for Celtic, he scored the winning goal six minutes from the end of the 1985 Scottish Cup Final.

In June 1985, McGarvey rejoined St Mirren for £80,000. Two years later, he won a third Scottish Cup with them. In total he played 387 times for St Mirren, scoring 125 goals. Later in his career, McGarvey had spells with Dumfries club Queen of the South (where he was player-manager), Clyde (with whom he won a Second Division Championship title at the age of 37) before playing in junior football with Shotts Bon Accord and Troon.

Having retired from the game before footballers began earning high salaries (he noted that he earned £330 a week while playing for Celtic), McGarvey later worked as a joiner in Scotland.

In 2008, McGarvey wrote an autobiography, Totally Frank, in which he described the highs and lows of his career and revealed how he overcame a long-time gambling addiction.

In 2009, Celtic were drawn with Rapid Vienna of Austria in a Europa League tie – 25 years after a controversial Cup Winners' Cup game at Celtic Park when a Rapid Vienna player claimed to have been hit by a bottle thrown by a Celtic fan. Celtic were in the lead, but UEFA ordered a replay of the match at a neutral venue – and the Austrian side ultimately won the re-match at Old Trafford, Manchester. McGarvey sparked controversy among Rapid Vienna officials and fans by urging the club to apologise for what he classed as "completely disrespectful" and a "hornet's nest" in the form of their fans behaving in a manner which caused the game to be cancelled in hope of being able to get through to the next stage of the competition.

== Personal life and death ==
In October 2022, McGarvey's family announced that he had been diagnosed with pancreatic cancer. He died on 1 January 2023, at age 66, with his son confirming the news on social media.

== Honours ==
St Mirren

- Scottish First Division: 1976–77
- Scottish Cup: 1986–87

Liverpool

- The Central League: 1979–80

Celtic

- Scottish Premier Division: 1980–81, 1981–82
- Scottish Cup: 1979–80, 1984–85
- Scottish League Cup: 1982–83

Clyde

- Scottish Second Division: 1992–93

Shotts Bon Accord

- Central Jr League Cup: 1994–95
