= Murdo MacLeod =

Scottish footballer and manager (born 1958)

Personal information
- Full name: Murdo Davidson MacLeod
- Date of birth: 24 September 1958 (age 68)
- Place of birth: Milngavie, Scotland
- Height: 5 ft 10 in (1.78 m)
- Position: Midfielder

Youth career
- 1974: Glasgow Amateurs

Senior career*
Years	Team	Apps	(Gls)
1975–1978	Dumbarton	87	(9)
1978–1987	Celtic	281	(55)
1987–1990	Borussia Dortmund	103	(4)
1990–1993	Hibernian	78	(2)
1993–1995	Dumbarton	66	(1)
1995–1997	Partick Thistle	1	(0)
Total		619	(71)

International career
1978	Scottish League XI	1	(0)
1978–1979	Scotland U-21	4	(2)
1985–1991	Scotland	20	(1)

Managerial career
- 1993–1995: Dumbarton
- 1995–1997: Partick Thistle
- 1997–1998: Celtic (assistant)
- * Club domestic league appearances and goals

Murdo Davidson MacLeod (born 24 September 1958 in Milngavie) is a Scottish former professional football player and manager. As a midfielder who was also adept in defensive positions, including sweeper and full-back when required, MacLeod was known for his energy, ball-winning capabilities in the centre of the pitch, and long-range shooting. He made over 600 professional appearances and won titles in the top leagues of both Scotland and Germany.

Over a 22-year playing career he won four league championships and six national cup competitions in Scotland and Germany, played in the latter stages of the European Cup, and made 20 appearances for Scotland including the 1990 World Cup Finals.

After a successful playing career with Dumbarton, Celtic, Borussia Dortmund and Hibernian, he became a manager during the mid-1990s, serving both Dumbarton and Partick Thistle. MacLeod then returned to Celtic as assistant manager, enjoying a successful season in tandem with Wim Jansen. Since leaving Celtic as a result of Jansen's departure from Celtic Park in 1998, MacLeod has worked as a football pundit for newspapers, radio and television.

== Early life and career ==
MacLeod was born in Milngavie in 1958 and signed for Dumbarton in the mid-1970s. His younger brother Alastair (Ally) was also signed by the club. Murdo joined the club in 1975 and played 87 competitive first-team league matches in his first spell at the club, scoring 9 goals during a promising period for Dumbarton under managers Alex Wright and later Davie Wilson. By the time of his transfer to Celtic as a 20-year-old in 1978, MacLeod had already played over 100 matches for Dumbarton in all competitions, with his 100th appearance for the club coming in a league match against Clyde in the 1978–79 season.

MacLeod was selected by the Scottish League in 1978, playing in a 1–1 draw against the Italian League. Also in 1978, he was selected by Andy Roxburgh for the Scotland Under-21 team, with his first match against the United States at Pittodrie, becoming only the second Dumbarton player to be capped at that level. MacLeod scored in a 3–1 victory.

== From a promising start at Dumbarton to success at Celtic ==
As a standout performer in a talented young Dumbarton team which included his future Celtic team-mate Graeme Sinclair, along with future Everton player and Scotland international Graeme Sharp, MacLeod's performances attracted attention from Celtic, and he signed for the club in November 1978 for a transfer fee of £100,000. He made his Celtic debut in a 2–1 defeat against Motherwell at Celtic Park on 4 November 1978. He scored his first Celtic goal in a league match against Hibernian at Easter Road later that month, with a shot from approximately 25 yards.

During his nine years at Celtic Park, MacLeod won four league titles, two Scottish Cups and one League Cup. MacLeod scored a goal that helped Celtic win the league championship in 1979, in a decisive match against Rangers which Celtic won 4-2 despite being reduced to ten men after Johnny Doyle was sent off. In 2000, Celtic supporters voted that it was the greatest ever goal scored in an Old Firm derby game.

His first hat-trick for the club came in a 6–1 win during a pre-season friendly match against China in August 1979. He was a key contributor in Celtic's 1979–80 Scottish Cup success, scoring a late equaliser against St Mirren in the fourth round to take the game to a replay, which Celtic won before going on to win the competition, defeating Rangers 1–0 at Hampden after extra time. During the 1981–82 season, MacLeod scored 14 goals and appeared in every match that Celtic played. He bettered this scoring record with 19 goals from midfield during the 1982–83 season, including the winning goal in the 1982 League Cup final against Rangers at Hampden.

MacLeod made his European debut for Celtic in September 1979, in a 4-2 aggregate victory over Partizani Tirana. He was a key part of the Celtic side that reached the European Cup Quarter Final that season, where they lost 3–2 on aggregate to Real Madrid. His first European goal for Celtic came in the 1981-1982 European Cup, where he scored the only goal in a 1–0 victory over Juventus.

== Move to Borussia Dortmund and success in Germany ==
MacLeod was a key player for Celtic throughout the early and mid-1980s. However, in May 1987, shortly before the commencement of Celtic's double-winning centenary season, he rejected a contract offer from the club and moved to German club Borussia Dortmund a month later. MacLeod became only the third Scottish professional footballer to play in the Bundesliga and the first of three Scots to represent Dortmund, the other two being Paul Lambert and Scott Booth. During his time in Germany, he helped Dortmund to a fourth-place finish in the Bundesliga during the 1986/87 season under Reinhard Saftig, and qualification for the 1987/88 UEFA Cup, where he was part of the side that defeated his old club Celtic 3–2 on aggregate in the first round of the competition.

He continued to thrive as a player under Horst Köppel, who took charge as Dortmund head coach at the start of the 1987-88 season, and MacLeod remained with Dortmund until October 1990, making his final appearance against Chemnitzer FC in a 4–0 aggregate win in the first round of the UEFA Cup. In total, he played in 103 Bundesliga games during four years at the Westfalenstadion, scoring four goals. He won the German Cup with the club in 1989, which was Dortmund's first major trophy since the 1966 European Cup Winners’ Cup. He also won the 1989 DFB-Supercup with the club.

== Hibernian and 1991 League Cup win as captain ==
In October 1990, MacLeod returned to Scotland with Hibernian. He made 78 appearances for the club and captained them to victory in the 1991 Scottish League Cup Final against Dunfermline Athletic, the club's first major domestic trophy in nineteen years, and only their second-ever Scottish League Cup.

== Return to Dumbarton, Partick Thistle, and end of playing career ==
In 1992, MacLeod returned to Dumbarton as player-manager. With Jim Fallon as assistant manager, and MacLeod's brother Ally as coach, the team were promoted from League Division 2 at the end of the 1994–95 season after a 2–0 victory over Stirling Albion at Forthbank on the last day of the season. He also guided the club to the Stirlingshire Cup in 1994. MacLeod played 66 times for Dumbarton in this spell, usually in a sweeper role, scoring one goal.

Early the following season, MacLeod departed to take up the player-manager role with Partick Thistle in the Scottish Premier League. He made two playing appearances for the club - a 3–0 away defeat in the Premier League against Aberdeen in October 1995, and a 1-0 friendly defeat in Lurgan against Glenavon F.C. in July 1996, his final match as a player.

== International career ==
MacLeod had to wait until late in his career before becoming a Scotland regular. Between 1978 and 1979, he made four appearances for the Scotland Under 21 team, with two goals coming in a friendly against the USA and a European Under 21 Championship win against Norway. MacLeod's contributions helped ensure that Scotland topped their qualification group for the 1980 UEFA European Under-21 Championship, being undefeated in their games against Norway, Belgium and Portugal. MacLeod did not feature in Scotland's subsequent 2-1 aggregate quarter final defeat to England. He made his debut appearance for the full national team as a substitute against England in the 1985 Rous Cup. He made his first starting appearance for Scotland in October 1986, aged 28.

MacLeod went on to win a total of 20 full international caps for Scotland, playing in the 1990 FIFA World Cup tournament where Scotland were drawn against Costa Rica, Sweden and Brazil. During the final group-stage match against Brazil, a free kick from Brazilian midfielder Branco was blocked by MacLeod in the defensive wall, leaving him momentarily unconscious. With MacLeod lying prone in the middle of the pitch and showing obvious symptoms of concussion, referee Helmut Kohl allowed the match to continue, however recognising that MacLeod was in distress, Brazilian player Dunga purposely kicked the ball out of play to allow a pause in the match for MacLeod to receive treatment. After regaining consciousness, he played on for several minutes before being substituted in the 39th minute of the game.

When MacLeod returned to Borussia Dortmund three weeks after the event, the club's medical team were concerned that he was still suffering from headaches and showing the effects of post-concussion syndrome, and arranged for him to undergo a brain scan. Although no brain injury was identified, the club ordered him to rest for a further two weeks and monitored him before allowing him to return to training.

== Coaching career ==
After a successful playing career, he returned to Dumbarton as player-coach. He guided the club to promotion from the Second Division with a last day win over Stirling Albion in 1995. In the summer of 1995, MacLeod left the Sons to manage Premier Division club Partick Thistle. MacLeod's tenure at Firhill was unsuccessful, as the club were relegated at the end of the 1995–96 season. He re-joined Celtic as assistant coach under Wim Jansen, where he helped the club win a league and Scottish League Cup double in 1997–98, their only season in charge.

== Media work ==
MacLeod has written for the Daily Record and commentated on football for BBC Scotland and BBC Radio Scotland. MacLeod has also worked as a Scottish football analyst on Newstalk radio in Ireland. In 2012, he starred on the CBeebies show "My Story" with his grandsons, Murdo Jr. and Ross.

== Personal life ==
MacLeod was admitted to Golden Jubilee Hospital in Clydebank during January 2010 to have a heart operation.

MacLeod endorsed the Conservative Party in the 2010 General Election, campaigning for their candidate in the Argyll & Bute constituency. During the 2014 Scottish independence referendum he was a supporter of the Better Together campaign against Scottish independence.

== Honours ==
=== Player ===
Celtic

- Scottish Premier Division (4): 1978–79, 1980–81, 1981–82, 1985–86
- Scottish Cup (2): 1979–80, 1984–85
- Scottish League Cup (1): 1982–83

Borussia Dortmund

- DFB-Pokal (1): 1988–89
- DFB-Supercup (1): 1989

Hibernian

- Scottish League Cup (1): 1991–92

Scotland

- Rous Cup: 1985

=== Manager ===
Dumbarton

- Scottish Second Division promotion : 1994–95
- Stirlingshire Cup: 1993–94

== See also ==
- List of footballers in Scotland by number of league appearances (500+)
