= David Provan (footballer, born 1956) =

Scottish footballer

Davie Provan
Personal information
- Full name: David Alexander Provan
- Date of birth: 8 May 1956 (age 70)
- Place of birth: Gourock, Scotland
- Position: Winger

Youth career
- Port Glasgow

Senior career*
Years	Team	Apps	(Gls)
1974–1978	Kilmarnock	120	(9)
1978–1987	Celtic	206	(28)
Total		326	(37)

International career
1976	Scotland u21	1	(0)
1978	Scottish League XI	1	(0)
1979–1982	Scotland	10	(1)
- * Club domestic league appearances and goals

David Alexander Provan (born 8 May 1956) is a Scottish former footballer, who played for Kilmarnock, Celtic and Scotland. While playing for Celtic, Provan won four Premier Division medals, two Scottish Cups and one League Cup.

He earned ten international caps and scored one goal for Scotland, and was a non-playing member of their 1982 World Cup squad. Provan also represented the Scottish League.

Provan retired in 1987 after he began to suffer from ME. He has since worked in the media.

== Playing career ==
=== Kilmarnock ===
Provan began his senior career at Kilmarnock in 1974, having signed from Junior club Port Glasgow. In his four years at Rugby Park, A Winger, Provan's skill and prowess in crossing at pace saw him make 139 appearances at Kilmarnock, scoring 10 goals in total. Provan played an integral part in two of Kilmarnock's three promotion achieving seasons in the 1970s (1973/74, 1975/76), and played at the start of their third, 1978/79. His form for Kilmarnock in the mid 1970s saw him capped at Under 21 level by Scotland in an away match against Czechoslovakia in October 1976.

In 1978 Provan played for the Scottish League Select in a match against their Italian counterparts in Verona. The same year, he also shone for Killie in their shock Scottish Cup 4th round replay win over Celtic. This was the first time that a club from a lower division had knocked out the holders of the Scottish Cup.

=== Celtic ===
New Celtic manager, Billy McNeill signed Provan in September 1978. The transfer fee of £120,000 was at the time a record in Scottish football. He grew up supporting Rangers and his teammates would joke about this while he played for Celtic.

Provan quickly established himself in McNeill's revamped Celtic side, scoring his first goal against Hibernian at Easter Road on 18 November 1978. In May 1979 Provan won his first major winner's medal as Celtic clinched the Premier Division by defeating Rangers 4–2 in the last game of the league season. The following year Provan was voted SPFA Player of the Year by his fellow professionals. Provan was proving to be a huge success at Celtic and his distinctive long curly hair, jersey hanging over his shorts and socks down at his ankles made him - visually alone - a standout figure on the field of play in Scotland.

Provan went on to win a further three League championships with Celtic (1980–81, 1981–82 and 1985–86), along with one Scottish League Cup (1982) and two Scottish Cups (1980 and 1985). The latter Scottish Cup saw Provan write himself into football history, becoming only the third player at that time to score direct from a free kick in a Scottish Cup final. Celtic had been a goal down to Dundee United at the time, and following Provan's equaliser went on to win 2–1.

Only twice before in the history of the Scottish Cup,
have goals been scored direct from a free kick.
Is this a bit of history...? It IS!

— Archie MacPherson's live commentary of
Davie Provan's goal in the 1985 Scottish Cup Final

The start of season 1985–86 saw Provan in exceptional form for Celtic, resulting in intense media speculation that a recall to the Scotland international side was on the cards. However, Provan had to be substituted during a 3–0 Old Firm defeat at Ibrox in November due to illness. This turned out to be M.E. - Myalgic Encephalomyelitis - a long-term condition that leaves the sufferer extremely lethargic and unable to perform much in the way of physical activity. Provan made several attempts at rehabilitation but eventually made the decision in the summer of 1987 to retire from playing football. His last game was coming on as a substitute against Motherwell in January 1986. A testimonial was arranged for Provan, and in November 1987 Celtic played Nottingham Forest in front of 42,000 fans, losing 3–1. Kenny Dalglish made a guest appearance for Celtic, with Provan playing for the first eight minutes.

=== Scotland ===
Provan's success at Celtic saw him capped for Scotland 10 times. He made his debut against Belgium in November 1979, scored against Israel in a 3–1 win at Hampden in a 1982 World Cup qualifier, and was part of Jock Stein's 22-man squad for the 1982 World Cup finals in Spain although he did not actually play. John Robertson (Nottingham Forest), Davie Cooper (Rangers) and Peter Weir (Aberdeen) competed with Provan for an international place.

== Media work ==
Since his retirement as a player, Provan has worked in the media as a pundit and co-commentator for Sky Sports. Since the 2012–13 season, he has been one of the main co-commentators on Sky's coverage of the Premier League, Champions League and Scottish Professional Football League.

Provan was also a columnist for several years for the Scottish edition of the now defunct News of the World and now writes for its sister paper, The Sun.

== Personal life ==
Provan is married to Fiona and the couple have two daughters, Kelly and Anna.

== Honours ==
=== Club ===
Celtic

- Scottish Premier Division: 1978-79, 1980-81, 1981-82, 1985-86
- Scottish Cup: 1980, 1985
- Scottish League Cup: 1982

=== Individual ===
- Scottish PFA Player of the Year: 1980
