= Mike Conroy (footballer, born 1957) =

Scottish footballer

Personal information
- Full name: Michael George Conroy
- Date of birth: 31 July 1957 (age 69)
- Place of birth: Johnstone, Scotland
- Height: 5 ft 9 in (1.75 m)
- Position: Midfielder

Youth career
- Port Glasgow

Senior career*
Years	Team	Apps	(Gls)
1977–1982	Celtic	66	(9)
1982–1984	Hibernian	31	(2)
1984–1986	Blackpool	66	(2)
1986–1987	Wrexham	25	(2)
1987–1988	Leyton Orient	3	(0)
1988–1992	Cork City	92	(2)
Total		283	(17)
- * Club domestic league appearances and goals

Michael George Conroy (born 31 July 1957) is a Scottish former professional footballer who played as a midfielder. He played in the Scottish Premier Division with Celtic (winning three league championships and a Scottish Cup) and Hibernian, before playing for several clubs in the Football League.

With Wrexham A.F.C. he scored in the 1986–87 European Cup Winners' Cup at Żurrieq F.C.

He signed for Cork City, who were managed by Eamonn O'Keefe in 1988 and made his League of Ireland debut on the 11th of September. At the end of the season he played in the 1989 FAI Cup Final and replay. Despite losing out they qualified for Europe for the first time in the 1989–90 European Cup Winners' Cup where he played in both legs against FC Torpedo Moscow. As player-coach, Mick played in the famous 1-1 draw with FC Bayern Munich in the 1991–92 UEFA Cup and after retiring at the end of that season would then go on to share his expertise of the game with youngsters in Cork for almost three decades and was one of the first coaches on the Emerging Talent Programme in Cork

Conroy lives in Cork City.

His father, also named Michael, was also a footballer who played for Celtic on the a part-time basis in the 1950s and later worked as a scout for the club.

== Honours ==
Celtic

- Scottish League champions: 1978–79 Scottish Premier Division, 1980–81 Scottish Premier Division

,1981–82 Scottish Premier Division

- Scottish Cup: 1979–80

== Sources ==
- Irish Football Handbook by Dave Galvin & Gerry Desmond (ISBN 0-9517987-3-1)
