= Tom McAdam =

Scottish footballer

Personal information
- Full name: Thomas Ian McAdam
- Date of birth: 9 April 1954 (age 72)
- Place of birth: Glasgow, Scotland
- Height: 6 ft 0 in (1.83 m)
- Positions: Centre forward; central defender

Senior career*
| Years | Team | Apps | (Gls) |
| 1970–1975 | Dumbarton | 77 | (30) |
| 1975–1977 | Dundee United | 61 | (21) |
| 1977–1986 | Celtic | 261 | (37) |
| 1986 | Stockport County | 5 | (1) |
| 1986 | Hamilton Academical | 3 | (0) |
| 1986–1989 | Motherwell | 99 | (3) |
| 1989–1991 | Airdrieonians | 24 | (1) |
| Total | | 530 | (93) |
- * Club domestic league appearances and goals

Thomas Ian McAdam (born 9 April 1954) is a Scottish former footballer who played for a number of British clubs, spending around half of his career with Celtic. He began as a forward but was later converted to a defender, where he played for the majority of his career.

== Playing career ==
McAdam began his career as a striker with Dumbarton in the early 1970s. He joined Dundee Utd in October 1975 for a fee of £37,000 and made his debut for the club on 1 November 1975 in a home league fixture against St Johnstone, scoring twice in a 3–1 win. Over the next two years, McAdam scored 24 goals in 74 appearances.

Jock Stein signed McAdam for Celtic in September 1977 for a fee of £60,000. He initially struggled to hold down a regular place in the team, and was often on the substitutes bench. Stein's successor as manager, Billy McNeill, played McAdam in central defence in the final league match of season 1978–79, against Rangers; McAdam played well and helped Celtic win 4–2 to clinch the league title. The positional move was a success and McAdam eventually played over 350 games for Celtic before leaving on a free transfer in 1986. McAdam won three league titles, a Scottish Cup and a League Cup in his time at Parkhead.

McAdam then had short spells at Stockport County and Hamilton Accies, before signing for Motherwell. He spent three years at Fir Park before moving to Airdrie in November 1989, where he finished his playing career.

After retirement, McAdam returned to Celtic for a spell during the 1990s as reserve coach.

McAdam's elder brother Colin was also a professional footballer, who played for Celtic's biggest rivals Rangers at the same time as Tom was with Celtic; they played against each other in Old Firm matches eight times. They both started at Dumbarton and played there alongside each other, and both later signed for Motherwell but at different times.

== Honours ==
Celtic

- Scottish League Champions (3): 1978–79, 1980–81, 1981–82
- Scottish Cup: 1984–85
- Scottish League Cup: 1982–83

== See also ==
- List of footballers in Scotland by number of league appearances (500+)
