= 1980–81 Scottish League Cup =

Tournament details
- Country: Scotland

Final positions
- Champions: Dundee United
- Runners-up: Dundee

Tournament statistics
- Top goal scorer: Paul Sturrock (9)

The 1980–81 Scottish League Cup was the thirty-fifth season of Scotland's second football knockout competition. The competition was won by Dundee United for a second successive season, who defeated Dundee in the Final.

== First round ==
=== First leg ===
Home team	Score	Away team	Date
Ayr United	1–2	Morton	13 August 1980
East Fife	2–5	Dundee United	13 August 1980
Kilmarnock	1–0	Airdrieonians	13 August 1980
Queen's Park	1–0	East Stirlingshire	13 August 1980
Raith Rovers	3–2	Falkirk	13 August 1980
St Johnstone	0–2	Clydebank	13 August 1980

=== Second leg ===
Home team	Score	Away team	Date	Agg
Airdrieonians	0–1	Kilmarnock	20 August 1980	0–2
Clydebank	0–0	St Johnstone	20 August 1980	2–0
Dundee United	4–0	East Fife	20 August 1980	9–2
East Stirlingshire	0–4	Queen's Park	19 August 1980	0–5
Falkirk	0–2	Raith Rovers	20 August 1980	2–5
Morton	0–2	Ayr United	20 August 1980	2–3

== Second round ==
=== First leg ===
Home team	Score	Away team	Date
Aberdeen	8–1	Berwick Rangers	27 August 1980
Albion Rovers	1–2	St Mirren	26 August 1980
Alloa Athletic	0–2	Hibernian	27 August 1980
Brechin City	0–0	Clyde	27 August 1980
Dumbarton	0–1	Raith Rovers	27 August 1980
Dundee	2–0	Arbroath	26 August 1980
Dundee United	4–0	Cowdenbeath	27 August 1980
Forfar Athletic	0–2	Rangers	27 August 1980
Hamilton Academical	5–1	Stranraer	27 August 1980
Heart of Midlothian	2–1	Montrose	27 August 1980
Kilmarnock	0–0	Dunfermline Ath	27 August 1980
Meadowbank Thistle	1–2	Clydebank	27 August 1980
Partick Thistle	3–1	Queen's Park	27 August 1980
Queen of the South	1–2	Ayr United	27 August 1980
Stenhousemuir	0–0	Motherwell	27 August 1980
Stirling Albion	1–0	Celtic	27 August 1980

=== Second leg ===
Home team	Score	Away team	Date	Agg
Arbroath	0–3	Dundee	30 August 1980	0–5
Ayr United	1–0	Queen of the South	30 August 1980	3–1
Berwick Rangers	0–4	Aberdeen	30 August 1980	1–12
Celtic	6–1	Stirling Albion	30 August 1980	6–2
Clyde	2–1	Brechin City	30 August 1980	2–1
Clydebank	2–1	Meadowbank Thistle	30 August 1980	4–2
Cowdenbeath	1–4	Dundee United	30 August 1980	1–8
Dunfermline Ath	1–2	Kilmarnock	30 August 1980	1–2
Hibernian	1–1	Alloa Athletic	30 August 1980	3–1
Montrose	1–3	Heart of Midlothian	30 August 1980	2–5
Motherwell	6–1	Stenhousemuir	30 August 1980	6–1
Queen's Park	1–1	Partick Thistle	30 August 1980	2–4
Raith Rovers	1–1	Dumbarton	30 August 1980	2–1
Rangers	3–1	Forfar Athletic	30 August 1980	5–1
St Mirren	5–0	Albion Rovers	30 August 1980	7–1
Stranraer	0–2	Hamilton Academical	30 August 1980	1–7

== Third round ==
=== First leg ===
Home team	Score	Away team	Date
Clyde	0–2	Hibernian	3 September 1980
Dundee	0–0	Kilmarnock	3 September 1980
Hamilton Academical	1–3	Celtic	22 September 1980
Heart of Midlothian	2–3	Ayr United	3 September 1980
Motherwell	2–1	Dundee United	3 September 1980
Partick Thistle	2–0	St Mirren	3 September 1980
Raith Rovers	0–1	Clydebank	3 September 1980
Rangers	1–0	Aberdeen	3 September 1980

=== Second leg ===
Home team	Score	Away team	Date	Agg
Aberdeen	3–1	Rangers	24 September 1980	3–2
Ayr United	4–0	Heart of Midlothian	24 September 1980	7–2
Celtic	4–1	Hamilton Academical	24 September 1980	7–2
Clydebank	1–0	Raith Rovers	24 September 1980	2–0
Dundee United	4–2	Motherwell	24 September 1980	5–4
Hibernian	2–1	Clyde	24 September 1980	4–1
Kilmarnock	0–0	Dundee	24 September 1980	0–0
St Mirren	0–0	Partick Thistle	24 September 1980	0–2

== Quarter-finals ==
=== First leg ===
Home team	Score	Away team	Date
Ayr United	2–2	Hibernian	8 October 1980
Clydebank	2–1	Dundee United	8 October 1980
Dundee	0–0	Aberdeen	8 October 1980
Partick Thistle	0–1	Celtic	8 October 1980

=== Second leg ===
Home team	Score	Away team	Date	Agg
Aberdeen	0–1	Dundee	29 October 1980	0–1
Celtic	2–1	Partick Thistle	20 October 1980	3–1
Dundee United	4–1	Clydebank	29 October 1980	5–3
Hibernian	0–2	Ayr United	22 October 1980	2–4

== Semi-finals ==
=== First leg ===
Home team	Score	Away team	Date
Ayr United	1–1	Dundee	5 November 1980
Dundee United	1–1	Celtic	12 November 1980

=== Second leg ===
Home team	Score	Away team	Date	Agg
Celtic	0–3	Dundee United	19 November 1980	1–4
Dundee	3–2	Ayr United	19 November 1980	4–3

== Final ==
6 December 1980

Dundee United	3–0	Dundee
Dodds 44'; Sturrock 59' 82'

Dens Park, Dundee
Attendance: 24,466
