= Johnny Doyle (Scottish footballer) =

Scottish footballer

Personal information
- Full name: John Doyle
- Date of birth: 11 May 1951
- Place of birth: Uddingston, Scotland
- Date of death: 19 October 1981 (aged 30)
- Place of death: Kilmarnock, Scotland
- Height: 5 ft 8 in (1.73 m)
- Position: Winger

Youth career
- Viewpark
- 1968–1970: Ayr United

Senior career*
Years	Team	Apps	(Gls)
1970–1976	Ayr United	155	(24)
1976–1981	Celtic	118	(14)

International career
1973–1974	Scotland U23	3	(0)
1975	Scotland	1	(0)
- * Club domestic league appearances and goals

John Doyle (11 May 1951 – 19 October 1981) was a Scottish professional footballer who played as a winger for Ayr United, Celtic and the Scotland national team.

== Career ==
=== Ayr United ===
Born in Uddingston, Lanarkshire, Doyle was raised in nearby Viewpark and was a committed Celtic supporter from childhood. He started his career with Ayr United, whom he joined from juvenile side Viewpark in 1968, making his senior debut in 1970. Strong performances, including in a convincing win over Rangers in 1975, drew interest from bigger clubs.

=== Celtic ===
In March 1976, Doyle transferred to Celtic for a fee of £90,000. He made 168 appearances in the major domestic competitions during his time with the Glasgow club, scoring 35 goals, and also played in UEFA competitions, including scoring against Real Madrid in the 1979–80 European Cup.

During a match against former club Ayr United in August 1977, Doyle was sent off: the referee awarded a free kick for handball against him, but Doyle continued to play on and his attempted cross struck the referee in the face accidentally, knocking him over and leaving him in need of treatment. When the official recovered he issued a red card to Doyle, who reacted furiously, storming off the park and down the tunnel. The dismissal was later rescinded. He had also been sent off playing for Ayr against Celtic a short time before signing for them.

Another memorable fixture involving Doyle in May 1979 also featured a red card: he was dismissed in the second half of a title-deciding Old Firm match against Rangers with his team already a goal down, but they secured a 4–2 victory and the Premier Division title, the feat becoming known among supporters by the slogan '10 men won the league'.

=== International ===
While playing for Ayr United, he made his only appearance for the Scotland national team on 17 December 1975 in a 1–1 draw with Romania during 1976 UEFA European Championship qualification. Doyle was substituted alongside Kenny Dalglish after 73 minutes, with Peter Lorimer replacing him. He was the first serving member of the Honest Men to play for Scotland since Bob Hepburn in 1932; none have done so since.

== Death ==
Doyle died in 1981, at the age of 30, when he was electrocuted while working on his new Kilmarnock home. Celtic dedicated their 1981–82 Scottish Premier Division championship to his memory, and he was commemorated in song by Irish/Celtic band Charlie and the Bhoys.

== Honours ==
Celtic

- Scottish Premier Division: 1976–77, 1978–79 (Note: Did not make sufficient appearances in 1980–81 or 1981–82 wins.)
- Scottish Cup: 1976–77, 1979–80
- Scottish League Cup: runner-up 1976–77, 1977–78
