= Peter Latchford =

English footballer (born 1952)

Personal information
- Full name: Peter William Latchford
- Date of birth: 27 September 1952 (age 74)
- Place of birth: Kings Heath, Birmingham, England
- Position: Goalkeeper

Youth career
- 1969: West Bromwich Albion

Senior career*
Years	Team	Apps	(Gls)
1969–1975	West Bromwich Albion	100	(0)
1975	→ Celtic (loan)	10	(0)
1975–1987	Celtic	177	(0)
1987–1989	Clyde	12	(0)
Total		280	(0)

International career
1973–1974	England U23	2	(0)
- * Club domestic league appearances and goals

Peter William Latchford (born 27 September 1952) is an English former football goalkeeper. He was born in Birmingham and has three older brothers; the eldest John, Dave, who was also a goalkeeper and played over 200 games for Birmingham City, and more famously the Everton and England striker, Bob Latchford who also started his career at Birmingham City.

Latchford spent most of his career in Scotland with Celtic, where he was known affectionately by the fans as 'Gas Meter' (rhyming slang for Peter) and 'The Cat'.

== Playing career ==
Whilst his two elder brothers both began their careers at Birmingham City, Peter Latchford started his career at local rivals West Bromwich Albion. By early 1975 Latchford had played over 80 league games, however at this time he had been dropped from the first-team and was playing with the youth side.

Having expressed his frustration at lack of first-team football to manager Don Howe, a loan deal with Celtic was arranged and Latchford made his debut for The Bhoys on 22 February 1975 in a 2–1 league defeat against Hibernian at Easter Road. Latchford played 13 more league and Scottish Cup games that season for Celtic, culminating in his first winner's medal as Celtic defeated Airdrie 3–1 in the 1975 Scottish Cup final.

Latchford had impressed sufficiently at Celtic for the loan deal to be made permanent, and on 14 July 1975 Celtic paid a transfer fee of £25,000 to West Brom. He made over 270 appearances for Celtic in the late 1970s and early 1980s, winning two League Championships and three Scottish Cups; these successes included a league and cup double in 1976–77, the 4–2 win over Rangers in the '10 men win the league' game in 1979 and the 1980 Cup Final (Celtic beat Rangers 1–0 after extra time, preceding a riot among supporters) the following season.

Latchford also played in several European ties for Celtic. On 22 October 1975, he starred in a 0–0 draw in the away leg of a European Cup Winners Cup tie against Boavista. He pulled off several saves to deny the Portuguese side, and capped off an outstanding performance with a penalty save from João Alves in the 85th minute. Celtic won the return leg 3–1 at Parkhead to progress to the quarter finals. Latchford's most memorable European game though was on 5 March 1980 when Celtic played Real Madrid at Parkhead in the first leg of a European Cup quarter-final tie. His saves from England striker Laurie Cunningham and Spanish star Santillana helped Celtic to a 2–0 win on the night, although Celtic lost the return leg in Spain 3–0 to go out on aggregate.

Latchford sustained a hand injury in the summer of 1980 and lost his place in the team to Pat Bonner. From then on Latchford featured rarely for Celtic, but he remained loyal to the club – to the probable detriment of his career. He did, however, get a brief run of first-team action during early 1986 when Bonner was out injured. He finally left in Celtic in the summer of 1987 after having made 272 competitive appearances for the club. Latchford joined Clyde on a one-year deal, where after a season he finally retired.

== Coaching ==
Latchford became a goalkeeping coach after his playing career, and worked in this capacity for Forfar Athletic, Clyde, Hearts and Motherwell. For a few years he combined goalkeeping coach duties at Dumfries club Queen of the South with coaching the youth goalkeepers at Celtic. Latchford's spell at Queens included the 2007–08 season run to the final of the Scottish Cup, where they lost narrowly (3–2) to Rangers. He left Queen of the South in June 2011 following the appointment of a new management team there.

== International career ==
Whilst at West Bromwich Albion, Latchford was capped twice for the England U23 side. He played against Poland in October 1973 (0–0) and Wales in January 1974 (0–0). Latchford was never capped at senior level.

== Honours ==
Celtic

- Scottish League: 1976–77, 1978–79
- Scottish Cup: 1974–75, 1976–77, 1979–80

== See also ==
- List of English association football families
