= Desmond White (footballer) =

Scottish footballer

Personal information
- Full name: Desmond White
- Date of birth: 28 September 1911
- Place of birth: Cathcart, Scotland
- Date of death: 21 June 1985 (aged 73)
- Place of death: Crete
- Position: Goalkeeper

Senior career*
Years	Team	Apps	(Gls)
1933–1935	Edinburgh City	36	(0)
1935–1938	Queen's Park	105	(0)
- * Club domestic league appearances and goals

Desmond White (28 September 1911 – 21 June 1985) was a Scottish amateur footballer who made over 100 appearances in the Scottish League for Queen's Park as a goalkeeper. He later served as chairman of Celtic.

== Personal life ==
White was the son of Celtic director Thomas White and was the father of Celtic director Chris White. He served as a flight lieutenant in the Royal Air Force during the Second World War and permanently lost the use of his right arm after an accident. He died while on holiday in Crete in June 1985.

== Career statistics ==
Appearances and goals by club, season and competition
Club	Season	League			Scottish Cup		Other		Total	
Club	Season	Division	Apps	Goals	Apps	Goals	Apps	Goals	Apps	Goals
Edinburgh City	1933–34	Scottish Second Division	15	0	1	0	—		16	0
Edinburgh City	1934–35	Scottish Second Division	21	0	1	0	—		22	0
Edinburgh City	Total		36	0	2	0	—		38	0
Queen's Park	1934–35	Scottish First Division	8	0	1	0	0	0	9	0
Queen's Park	1935–36	Scottish First Division	34	0	1	0	2 (Note: 1 appearance in Glasgow Merchants Charity Cup, 1 appearance in Glasgow Cup)	0	37	0
Queen's Park	1936–37	Scottish First Division	30	0	2	0	1 (Note: Appearance in Glasgow Cup)	0	33	0
Queen's Park	1937–38	Scottish First Division	33	0	3	0	3 (Note: 2 appearances in Glasgow Cup, 1 appearance in Glasgow Merchants Charity Cup)	0	39	0
Queen's Park	Total		105	0	7	0	6	0	118	0
Career total			141	0	9	0	6	0	156	0
