= George McCluskey =

Scottish footballer

Personal information
- Full name: George McKinley Cassidy McCluskey
- Date of birth: 19 September 1957 (age 69)
- Place of birth: Hamilton, Scotland
- Position: Striker

Youth career
- 1970–1973: Celtic Boys Club

Senior career*
Years	Team	Apps	(Gls)
1973–1983	Celtic	145	(54)
1973–1974	→ Thorniewood United (loan)		
1983–1986	Leeds United	73	(16)
1986–1989	Hibernian	83	(16)
1989–1992	Hamilton Academical	95	(34)
1992–1994	Kilmarnock	57	(13)
1994–1996	Clyde	35	(8)
Total		488	(141)

International career
1978–1982	Scotland U21	7	(4)
- * Club domestic league appearances and goals

George McKinley Cassidy McCluskey (born 19 September 1957) is a Scottish former professional footballer who played as a forward for Celtic, Leeds United, Hibernian, Hamilton Academical, Kilmarnock and Clyde. He represented Scotland up to under-21 level.

While with Celtic (his childhood and formative team and longest spell as a professional at eight seasons, otherwise spending two or three years at each club), he scored the winning goal in the 1980 Scottish Cup Final and won three Scottish League titles (1978–79, 1980–81 and 1981–82), scoring in the decisive last-day fixtures in 1979 and 1982 and finishing as top goalscorer in the latter season. In the autumn of his career in 1993, he helped Kilmarnock (managed by his Celtic teammate and friend Tommy Burns) gain promotion to the top tier from the First Division, where they remained for 28 years.

McCluskey is now a coach at Celtic's Youth Academy.

== Personal life ==
George McCluskey's son Barry is registered blind and is a blind golf player. His younger brother, John, was also a footballer who played one match for Celtic in the early rounds of the European Cup in 1977 aged 16, becoming their youngest continental debutant (a record which stood for 42 years before being taken by Karamoko Dembélé in 2019) before being forced to retire soon afterwards due to a thrombosis condition in his leg which endangered his health. It was also revealed some years later that John McCluskey had been one of the victims of the sexual abuse of child footballers which took place at Celtic Boys Club (for which George also played) in the 1970s. The siblings are not related to Pat McCluskey who also played for Celtic in the 1970s.
