= Roy Baines =

English footballer and manager

Personal information
- Date of birth: 7 February 1950 (age 76)
- Place of birth: Derby, England
- Position: Goalkeeper

Youth career
- Derby County

Senior career*
Years	Team	Apps	(Gls)
1970–1972	Hibernian	23	(0)
1972–1976	Greenock Morton	117	(0)
1976–1979	Celtic	12	(0)
1979–1983	Greenock Morton	154	(0)
1983–1985	St Johnstone	39	(0)
Total		345	(0)

Managerial career
- Tranent
- * Club domestic league appearances and goals

Roy Baines (born 7 February 1950) is an English former professional football player and manager.

== Career ==
Born in Derby, Baines played as a goalkeeper for Derby County, Hibernian, Greenock Morton, Celtic and St Johnstone, before becoming manager of Tranent. Baines moved from Greenock Morton to Celtic in October 1976, in what The Glasgow Herald described as a "surprise move."
