= Tommy Burns (footballer) =

Scottish footballer and manager

Personal information
- Full name: Thomas Burns
- Date of birth: 16 December 1956
- Place of birth: Glasgow, Scotland
- Date of death: 15 May 2008 (aged 51)
- Place of death: Glasgow, Scotland
- Position: Midfielder

Youth career
- 1970-71: Eastercraigs Boys Club

Senior career*
Years	Team	Apps	(Gls)
1971–1989	Celtic	353	(52)
1973–1974	→ Maryhill (loan)		
1989–1994	Kilmarnock	151	(16)
Total		504	(68)

International career
1976–1982	Scotland U21	5	(0)
1978	Scottish League XI	1	(0)
1981–1988	Scotland	8	(0)

Managerial career
- 1992–1994: Kilmarnock
- 1994–1997: Celtic
- 1995–1998: Scotland B
- 1998–1999: Reading
- 2002–2007: Scotland (assistant)
- 2004: Scotland (caretaker)
- * Club domestic league appearances and goals

Thomas Burns (16 December 1956 – 15 May 2008) was a Scottish professional football player and manager. He is best known for his long association with Celtic, where he was a player, manager and coach.

Usually a midfielder, Burns played for Celtic from 1975 to 1989 and won six Scottish league championships, five Scottish Cups, and the Scottish League Cup once. He was also a Scotland international, winning eight caps between 1981 and 1988.

He finished playing with Kilmarnock, where he also began his managerial career. He returned to Celtic as manager in 1994, and won the Scottish Cup in 1995 – the first trophy the club had won in six years. After being sacked by Celtic in 1997 he managed Reading from 1998 to 1999. Burns returned to Celtic in 2000, and held positions including assistant manager, head of youth development and first team coach. He was also assistant manager of Scotland from 2002 to 2007.

Burns died of melanoma on 15 May 2008, aged 51.

== Early life ==
Burns was born in the Calton area of Glasgow, where he was brought up with his two sisters. He was educated at St Mary's Roman Catholic School and at St Mungo's Academy.

== Playing career ==
=== Celtic ===
Burns grew up supporting Celtic and began playing football with St.Mary's Boys Guild. He went on to play for Eastercraigs Boys Club and then Celtic Boys Club. After receiving offers to go to England to play professionally, he signed for Celtic in 1973, and was then farmed out to Maryhill Juniors in order to gain experience.

Burns made his debut against Dundee United on 19 April 1975 under manager Jock Stein, and by the end of the 1976–77 (which ended with Celtic as champions) had become a regular in the team. His best personal output was in 1983–84 with 13 goals from 55 appearances in all competitions, although Celtic finished as runners-up to Aberdeen in both the League and the Scottish Cup, and lost the League Cup final to Rangers.

Burns was a vital part of the side managed by Billy McNeill which won the league and cup double in 1987–88, the club's centenary season, participating in 37 matches in the campaign. In total, he made 353 league appearances for Celtic over 15 years and scored 52 goals, won six Scottish League titles and four Scottish Cups. In December 1989, just prior to his 33rd birthday, he received a testimonial match against Ajax in which he threw his boots to the crowd at Celtic Park. The club would later officially describe him as "a true Celtic legend" while the player himself stated that he was merely "a supporter who got lucky".

=== Kilmarnock ===
Immediately following his testimonial, Burns moved to third-tier Kilmarnock for a fee of £50,000, and in his first season in East Ayrshire helped the club achieve promotion. In 1990–91 'Killie' consolidated their status in the division with Burns playing a pivotal role (37 appearances, all as a starter, with 8 goals).

== Management and coaching ==
=== Kilmarnock ===
Burns became player-manager of Kilmarnock in April 1992, replacing Jim Fleeting for the final few games of the season. In 1992–93, his first full campaign in charge, the Rugby Park club won promotion to the Scottish Premier Division after a ten-year absence, with Burns also playing in 39 league fixtures during the season. He then featured in a dozen top-flight matches to help Kilmarnock avoid relegation, with his penultimate career appearance at the age of 37 being a 1–0 home win over Rangers which was also the last match prior to the stadium's redevelopment.

=== Celtic ===
Burns moved to become manager of Celtic (replacing Lou Macari) at the start of the 1994–95 season in acrimonious circumstances, as he was still under contract to Kilmarnock as both player and manager. Kilmarnock refused to release him from his contract and the Scottish Football Association subsequently fined Celtic £100,000 for 'tapping', or speaking to Burns without obtaining his current club's permission. Kilmarnock were also permitted to retain his playing registration, effectively ending his professional career as a player.

At Celtic, his team grew a reputation for playing attractive and attacking football and they won the Scottish Cup in 1995; but Celtic proved unable to break the domination of Old Firm rivals Rangers. Burns signed players like Pierre Van Hooijdonk, Paolo Di Canio and Jorge Cadete, and while the Celtic team lost just one game in the league during the 1995–96 season, they were unable to beat the Rangers team managed by Walter Smith. Burns commented that "Andy Goram [the Rangers goalkeeper] broke my heart" would be on his tombstone. After losing a Scottish Cup semi-final to Falkirk in 1997, Burns was sacked from Celtic by chairman Fergus McCann and went on to work under former Celtic colleague Kenny Dalglish at Newcastle United as a coach.

=== Reading ===
On 25 March 1998, Burns was appointed manager of Reading, who were struggling in Division One in what was their final season at Elm Park before the relocation to Madejski Stadium and would eventually finish in last place. He had been approached about the Reading manager's job the previous summer, but rejected it in favour of a coaching role under Dalglish.

Burns remained in this position until 16 September 1999, when he was dismissed following a poor sequence of results, after Reading's failure to win promotion from Division Two the previous year. He left an impression on some of the club's personnel, including future club captain Graeme Murty and youth coach Brendan Rodgers who later also managed Celtic.

=== Celtic and Scotland ===
In 2000, Burns returned to Celtic as assistant manager during Kenny Dalglish's short-lived tenure as manager. That summer, Martin O'Neill took over as the club's manager and brought in his own coaching staff, but retained Burns and placed him in charge of youth development. Upon the arrival of Gordon Strachan as manager in 2005, Burns was appointed first team coach, a role he combined with his youth development post. He is credited with guiding several young players who became internationals, including Shaun Maloney Stephen McManus, Aiden McGeady and John Kennedy and for his input into the design of the club's Lennoxtown training centre which opened in 2007.

Burns was appointed assistant manager of the Scottish national team under Berti Vogts in 2002 and retained the position under Walter Smith. In between, he managed Scotland for one match, a 4–1 friendly defeat to Sweden.

On 18 January 2007, Burns announced through the Celtic website that he was severing all ties with the Scottish national team to concentrate on his role at the club. It was reported by The Scotsman newspaper that Burns had found out that he was not a potential candidate for the job of national team coach, which had become available after Walter Smith moved to Rangers.

== Personal life ==
Burns met his wife Rosemary Smith when they were both 17, and they married in 1980. The couple had four children. A devout Roman Catholic, Burns attended Mass and took Communion every morning. Burns said of his faith: "It does not embarrass me to discuss my Faith in public because I'm not doing so to impress anyone or to have people think of me as what would be called a goody-goody. I turn to God at every opportunity because I am not different from anybody else and because I accept that I am sufficiently frail to need His help and guidance more than most."

== Illness and death ==
On 29 March 2006, Celtic confirmed Burns had begun treatment for melanoma skin cancer. On 10 March 2008, Celtic announced that he was facing another skin cancer scare, and would be undergoing further treatment for the disease. On 15 May 2008, Burns died at home.

Burns's funeral mass was celebrated at St Mary's, Abercromby Street (the church in whose hall was held the inaugural meeting of what was to become Celtic FC) in his native Calton on 20 May 2008 followed by interment at Linn Cemetery, Castlemilk.

=== Tributes ===
Celtic manager Gordon Strachan was among those who paid tribute to Burns. A visibly emotional Strachan said "being Tommy's mate was the best part of joining Celtic" and that "There weren't many better than him as a footballer. But, as a person, he was top of the league when it comes to being a man." Celtic chief executive Peter Lawwell said "If you define a Celtic man, it would certainly be Tommy Burns. He was a wonderful human being." Club captain Stephen McManus said "He was courageous and he was probably as brave a man as you'll ever meet."

Rangers assistant manager Ally McCoist, who had worked with Burns in his role for the Scotland national team, said "I have met a lot of good people through football but Tam was the very best." On 16 May, Rangers manager Walter Smith and McCoist arrived at Celtic Park to lay a wreath in memory of Burns, and then spent half an hour in the stadium, speaking with Celtic officials, then another half-hour outside speaking to fans. Smith and McCoist also served as pallbearers at Burns's funeral.

=== Stadium memorial ===
In 2010, a bronze relief memorial plaque for Burns was unveiled at the main stand of Celtic Park, depicting his trademark 'clasped hands' goal celebration as a player, lifting the Scottish Cup as manager and working as a youth coach, also referencing his local church.

== Tommy Burns supper ==
The Heriot Watt and Edinburgh University Celtic Supporters Club (HWEUCSC), holds an annual charity dinner, the 'Tommy Burns Supper', a parody of the traditional (Robert) Burns supper. The event was first held in 1987 and, becoming increasingly popular, was attended regularly by Burns as well as celebrities from sports and entertainment. HWEUCSC retired the Supper after Burns died, but it was revived in 2017 and held at Celtic Park, in collaboration with the club. It has since become an annual fixture once again, returning to its original home in Teviot Row House.

== Career statistics ==
=== Club ===
Appearances and goals by club, season and competition
Club	Division	Season	League		Cup		League Cup		Other (Note: Matches in Glasgow Cup, Anglo-Scottish Cup and Drybrough Cup included in source have been omitted)		Total	
Club	Division	Season	App	Goals	App	Goals	App	Goals	App	Goals	App	Goals
Celtic	Scottish Division One	1974–75	1	0	0	0	0	0	0	0	1	0
Celtic	Scottish Premier Division	1975–76	5	0	0	0	0	0	0	0	5	0
Celtic	Scottish Premier Division	1976–77	19	1	3	0	6	0	1 (Note: Match in 1976–77 UEFA Cup)	0	29	1
Celtic	Scottish Premier Division	1977–78	25	3	3	1	6	1	3 (Note: Matches in 1977–78 European Cup)	1	37	6
Celtic	Scottish Premier Division	1978–79	29	3	3	1	8	0	0	0	40	4
Celtic	Scottish Premier Division	1979–80	14	0	2	0	0	0	3 (Note: Matches in 1979–80 European Cup)	1	19	1
Celtic	Scottish Premier Division	1980–81	33	4	5	2	7	5	3 (Note: Matches in 1980–81 European Cup Winners' Cup)	0	48	11
Celtic	Scottish Premier Division	1981–82	33	9	2	0	6	0	2 (Note: Matches in 1981–82 European Cup)	0	43	9
Celtic	Scottish Premier Division	1982–83	17	7	1	0	8	3	2 (Note: Matches in 1982–83 European Cup)	0	28	10
Celtic	Scottish Premier Division	1983–84	33	9	5	3	11	0	6 (Note: Matches in 1983–84 UEFA Cup)	1	55	13
Celtic	Scottish Premier Division	1984–85	27	7	6	1	3	1	4 (Note: Matches in 1984–85 European Cup Winners' Cup)	1	40	10
Celtic	Scottish Premier Division	1985–86	34	5	3	0	3	1	2 (Note: Matches in 1985–86 European Cup Winners' Cup)	0	42	6
Celtic	Scottish Premier Division	1986–87	16	0	0	0	3	0	3 (Note: Matches in 1986–87 European Cup)	0	22	0
Celtic	Scottish Premier Division	1987–88	27	2	5	1	3	1	2 (Note: Matches in 1987–88 UEFA Cup)	0	37	4
Celtic	Scottish Premier Division	1988–89	32	2	5	3	3	2	3 (Note: Matches in 1988–89 European Cup)	0	43	7
Celtic	Scottish Premier Division	1989–90	8	0	0	0	3	1	1 (Note: Match in 1989–90 European Cup Winners' Cup)	0	12	1
Celtic	Total		353	52	43	12	70	15	35	4	501	83
Kilmarnock	Scottish Second Division	1989–90	22	3	2	0	0	0	0	0	24	3
Kilmarnock	Scottish First Division	1990–91	37	8	2	1	2	0	4 (Note: Matches in 1990–91 Scottish Challenge Cup)	1	45	10
Kilmarnock	Scottish First Division	1991–92	41	3	2	0	1	0	1 (Note: Matches in 1991–92 Scottish Challenge Cup)	0	45	3
Kilmarnock	Scottish First Division	1992–93	39	2	3	0	3	2	2 (Note: Match in 1992–93 Scottish Challenge Cup)	1	47	5
Kilmarnock	Scottish Premier Division	1993–94	12	0	1	0	0	0	0	0	13	0
Kilmarnock	Total		151	16	10	1	6	2	7	2	174	21
Career total			504	68	53	13	76	17	42	6	675	104

=== Managerial ===
As of 27 November 2013

Team	Nat	From	To	Record				
Team	Nat	From	To	G	W	D	L	Win %
Kilmarnock (Note: Matches in Ayrshire Cup included in source have been omitted)	(Scotland)	April 1992	July 1994	109	46	31	32	42.20
Celtic	(Scotland)	July 1994	May 1997	140	78	39	23	55.71
Scotland B	(Scotland)	October 1995	April 1998	4	2	0	2	50.00
Reading	(England)	March 1998	September 1999	68	20	18	30	29.41
Total				317	144	88	85	45.43

== Honours ==
=== Player ===
Celtic

- Scottish Premier Division (6): 1976–77, 1978–79, 1980–81, 1981–82, 1985–86, 1987–88
- Scottish Cup (5):1976–77, 1979–80, 1984–85, 1987–88, 1988–89
- Scottish League Cup: 1982–83

Kilmarnock

- Scottish Second Division: Runners-up (promoted) 1989–90
- Scottish First Division: Runners-up (promoted) 1992–93

=== Manager ===
Kilmarnock

- Scottish First Division: Runners-up (promoted) 1992–93
- Ayrshire Cup: 1993–94

Celtic

- Scottish Cup: 1994–95
- Scottish Premier Division: Runners-up 1995–96, 1996–97
- Scottish League Cup: Runners-up 1994–95

=== Assistant manager ===
Celtic

- Scottish Premier League: 2005–06, 2006–07, 2007–08
- Scottish Cup: 2006–07
- Scottish League Cup: 2005–06

=== Individual ===
- Kilmarnock Hall of Fame

== See also ==
- List of footballers in Scotland by number of league appearances (500+)
