= 1981–82 Scottish Premier Division =

76th season of top-tier football league in Scotland

Scottish Premier Division
- Season: 1981–82
- Champions: Celtic; 4th Premier Division title 33rd Scottish title
- Relegated: Partick Thistle; Airdrieonians
- European Cup: Celtic
- UEFA Cup: Rangers; Dundee United
- Cup Winners' Cup: Aberdeen
- Matches: 180
- Goals: 498 (2.77 per match)
- Top goalscorer: George McCluskey (21)
- Biggest home win: Celtic 6–0 Hibernian
- Biggest away win: Dundee 0–5 Aberdeen

The 1981–82 Scottish Premier Division season was won by Celtic, two points ahead of Aberdeen. The league was won on the final day of the season when Celtic defeated St Mirren 3–0 at Celtic Park on 15 May 1982. Partick Thistle and Airdrieonians were relegated.

== Table ==
| Pos | Team | Pld | W | D | L | GF | GA | GD | Pts | Qualification or relegation |
|---|---|---|---|---|---|---|---|---|---|---|
| 1 | Celtic (C) | 36 | 24 | 7 | 5 | 79 | 33 | +46 | 55 | Qualification for the European Cup first round |
| 2 | Aberdeen | 36 | 23 | 7 | 6 | 71 | 29 | +42 | 53 | Qualification for the Cup Winners' Cup first round |
| 3 | Rangers | 36 | 16 | 11 | 9 | 57 | 45 | +12 | 43 | Qualification for the UEFA Cup first round |
| 4 | Dundee United | 36 | 15 | 10 | 11 | 61 | 38 | +23 | 40 | Qualification for the UEFA Cup first round |
| 5 | St Mirren | 36 | 14 | 9 | 13 | 49 | 52 | −3 | 37 | |
| 6 | Hibernian | 36 | 11 | 14 | 11 | 38 | 40 | −2 | 36 | |
| 7 | Morton | 36 | 9 | 12 | 15 | 31 | 54 | −23 | 30 | |
| 8 | Dundee | 36 | 11 | 4 | 21 | 46 | 72 | −26 | 26 | |
| 9 | Partick Thistle (R) | 36 | 6 | 10 | 20 | 35 | 59 | −24 | 22 | Relegation to the 1982–83 Scottish First Division |
| 10 | Airdrieonians (R) | 36 | 5 | 8 | 23 | 31 | 76 | −45 | 18 | Relegation to the 1982–83 Scottish First Division |

Source: Statto
Rules for classification: 1) points; 2) goal difference; 3) number of goals scored.
(C) Champions; (R) Relegated

== Results ==
=== Matches 1–18 ===
During matches 1–18 each team plays every other team twice (home and away).

| Home \ Away | ABE | AIR | CEL | DND | DNU | HIB | MOR | PAR | RAN | STM |
|---|---|---|---|---|---|---|---|---|---|---|
| Aberdeen | | 0–0 | 1–3 | 2–1 | 1–1 | 1–0 | 2–0 | 2–1 | 3–1 | 4–1 |
| Airdrieonians | 0–4 | | 1–3 | 4–2 | 2–1 | 3–1 | 1–1 | 1–1 | 2–2 | 3–4 |
| Celtic | 2–1 | 5–2 | | 3–1 | 1–1 | 0–0 | 2–1 | 2–0 | 3–3 | 0–0 |
| Dundee | 0–3 | 3–1 | 1–3 | | 1–3 | 0–0 | 4–1 | 4–2 | 2–3 | 3–0 |
| Dundee United | 4–1 | 4–0 | 0–2 | 5–2 | | 1–0 | 3–0 | 0–0 | 2–0 | 0–2 |
| Hibernian | 1–1 | 1–1 | 1–0 | 2–0 | 1–1 | | 4–0 | 3–0 | 1–2 | 0–0 |
| Morton | 2–1 | 3–0 | 1–1 | 2–0 | 1–0 | 2–1 | | 1–0 | 0–0 | 0–2 |
| Partick Thistle | 0–2 | 4–1 | 0–2 | 1–2 | 2–3 | 1–0 | 2–2 | | 0–1 | 1–1 |
| Rangers | 0–0 | 4–1 | 0–2 | 2–1 | 2–0 | 2–2 | 1–1 | 0–2 | | 4–1 |
| St Mirren | 1–2 | 1–1 | 1–2 | 4–0 | 1–0 | 1–0 | 2–0 | 2–1 | 1–1 | |

Legend: Blue = home team win; Yellow = draw; Red = away team win.

=== Matches 19–36 ===
During matches 19–36 each team plays every other team twice (home and away).

| Home \ Away | ABE | AIR | CEL | DND | DNU | HIB | MOR | PAR | RAN | STM |
|---|---|---|---|---|---|---|---|---|---|---|
| Aberdeen | | 2–0 | 1–3 | 0–0 | 2–1 | 3–1 | 0–0 | 3–1 | 4–0 | 5–1 |
| Airdrieonians | 0–3 | | 1–5 | 0–2 | 2–0 | 0–2 | 1–1 | 3–1 | 0–1 | 0–2 |
| Celtic | 0–1 | 2–0 | | 4–2 | 3–1 | 6–0 | 1–0 | 2–2 | 2–1 | 3–0 |
| Dundee | 0–5 | 1–0 | 1–3 | | 0–2 | 2–2 | 2–1 | 1–2 | 3–1 | 0–2 |
| Dundee United | 1–2 | 4–0 | 3–0 | 1–1 | | 0–1 | 5–0 | 5–1 | 1–1 | 1–1 |
| Hibernian | 0–3 | 1–0 | 1–0 | 2–1 | 0–1 | | 2–2 | 1–1 | 0–0 | 2–1 |
| Morton | 2–1 | 1–0 | 1–1 | 2–0 | 1–1 | 0–0 | | 0–0 | 1–3 | 0–1 |
| Partick Thistle | 0–0 | 0–0 | 0–3 | 0–2 | 1–2 | 1–2 | 4–0 | | 2–0 | 0–0 |
| Rangers | 1–3 | 1–0 | 1–0 | 4–0 | 1–1 | 1–1 | 3–0 | 4–1 | | 3–0 |
| St Mirren | 0–2 | 3–0 | 2–5 | 0–1 | 2–2 | 2–2 | 3–1 | 2–0 | 2–3 | |

Legend: Blue = home team win; Yellow = draw; Red = away team win.

== Awards ==
| Award | Winner | Club |
|---|---|---|
| PFA Players' Player of the Year | (Scotland) Sandy Clark | Airdrieonians |
| PFA Young Player of the Year | (Scotland) Frank McAvennie | St Mirren |
| SFWA Footballer of the Year | (Scotland) Paul Sturrock | Dundee United |
