= 1978–79 Scottish Premier Division =

73rd season of top-tier football league in Scotland

Scottish Premier Division
- Season: 1978–79
- Champions: Celtic; 2nd Premier Division title 31st Scottish title
- Relegated: Heart of Midlothian; Motherwell
- European Cup: Celtic
- UEFA Cup: Dundee United; Aberdeen
- Cup Winners' Cup: Rangers
- Matches: 180
- Goals: 483 (2.68 per match)
- Top goalscorer: Andy Ritchie (22)
- Biggest home win: Aberdeen 8–0 Motherwell
- Biggest away win: Motherwell 1–5 Celtic

The 1978–79 Scottish Premier Division season was won by Celtic, three points ahead of Rangers.

Severe winter conditions meant that many games had to be rescheduled, with clubs finishing their fixture lists at different times. When Dundee United finished their season they were three points ahead of Rangers and four in front of Celtic, but both Old Firm clubs had four games left to play. Celtic subsequently clinched the championship in their final match with a 4–2 Old Firm derby victory against Rangers; although Rangers still had two further matches still to play, the resulting 5-point gap could not be closed.

Heart of Midlothian and Motherwell were relegated.

== Table ==
Pos	Team	Pld	W	D	L	GF	GA	GD	Pts	Qualification or relegation
1	Celtic (C)	36	21	6	9	61	37	+24	48	Qualification for the European Cup first round
2	Rangers	36	18	9	9	52	35	+17	45	Qualification for the Cup Winners' Cup first round
3	Dundee United	36	18	8	10	56	37	+19	44	Qualification for the UEFA Cup first round
4	Aberdeen	36	13	14	9	59	36	+23	40	Qualification for the UEFA Cup first round
5	Hibernian	36	12	13	11	44	48	−4	37	
6	St Mirren	36	15	6	15	45	41	+4	36	
7	Morton	36	12	12	12	52	53	−1	36	
8	Partick Thistle	36	13	8	15	42	39	+3	34	
9	Heart of Midlothian (R)	36	8	7	21	39	71	−32	23	Relegation to the 1979–80 Scottish First Division
10	Motherwell (R)	36	5	7	24	33	86	−53	17	Relegation to the 1979–80 Scottish First Division

Source: Statto and RSSSF
Rules for classification: 1) points; 2) goal difference; 3) number of goals scored.
(C) Champions; (R) Relegated

== Results ==
=== Matches 1–18 ===
During matches 1–18 each team plays every other team twice (home and away).

Home \ Away	ABE	CEL	DNU	HOM	HIB	MOR	MOT	PAR	RAN	STM
Aberdeen		1–1	0–2	5–0	0–0	1–2	8–0	2–1	2–1	1–2
Celtic	1–0		2–1	1–0	3–1	3–0	2–1	2–0	4–2	2–1
Dundee United	2–2	2–1		2–1	2–1	4–1	2–1	2–1	1–2	2–0
Heart of Midlothian	0–0	0–3	0–3		1–2	0–1	3–0	0–2	3–2	1–2
Hibernian	1–1	2–1	1–0	1–1		1–1	4–0	1–0	2–1	0–2
Morton	0–1	1–0	3–1	2–2	3–0		6–0	2–2	0–2	1–0
Motherwell	1–1	3–4	0–4	3–2	0–3	3–3		1–1	1–2	0–3
Partick Thistle	1–2	1–2	1–2	2–0	6–1	2–1	0–0		0–2	3–1
Rangers	2–0	1–0	1–0	4–0	1–0	1–1	3–0	1–0		1–0
St Mirren	2–2	0–2	2–1	2–1	2–3	3–1	1–0	1–1	1–2	

Legend: Blue = home team win; Yellow = draw; Red = away team win.

=== Matches 19–36 ===
During matches 19–36 each team plays every other team twice (home and away).

Home \ Away	ABE	CEL	DNU	HOM	HIB	MOR	MOT	PAR	RAN	STM
Aberdeen		4–1	1–0	1–2	4–1	3–1	4–0	1–1	0–0	1–1
Celtic	0–0		1–1	4–0	0–1	0–0	1–2	1–0	3–1	2–1
Dundee United	1–1	1–0		3–1	0–0	1–2	2–1	2–0	3–0	1–1
Heart of Midlothian	1–4	2–0	2–0		1–1	1–1	3–2	0–1	0–0	1–1
Hibernian	2–1	2–2	1–1	1–2		1–1	2–2	0–0	0–0	1–0
Morton	2–1	1–2	3–1	3–2	2–2		1–2	1–0	2–2	1–3
Motherwell	1–1	1–5	0–1	0–1	2–3	1–1		0–1	2–0	1–2
Partick Thistle	0–1	2–3	1–1	3–2	2–1	2–1	2–0		1–0	2–1
Rangers	1–1	1–1	1–1	5–3	2–1	3–0	4–1	0–0		0–1
St Mirren	2–1	0–1	1–3	4–0	1–0	0–0	0–1	1–0	0–1	

Legend: Blue = home team win; Yellow = draw; Red = away team win.

== Awards ==
Award	Winner	Club
PFA Players' Player of the Year	(Scotland) Paul Hegarty	Dundee United
PFA Young Player of the Year	(Scotland) Ray Stewart	Dundee United
SFWA Footballer of the Year	(Scotland) Andy Ritchie	Morton
