= 1980–81 Scottish Premier Division =

75th season of top-tier football league in Scotland

Scottish Premier Division
- Season: 1980–81
- Champions: Celtic; 3rd Premier Division title 32nd Scottish title
- Relegated: Kilmarnock; Heart of Midlothian
- European Cup: Celtic
- UEFA Cup: Aberdeen; Dundee United
- Cup Winners' Cup: Rangers
- Matches: 180
- Goals: 481 (2.67 per match)
- Top goalscorer: Frank McGarvey (23)
- Biggest home win: Dundee United 7–0 Kilmarnock
- Biggest away win: Kilmarnock 1–8 Rangers

The 1980–81 Scottish Premier Division was the sixth season of the Premier Division, and the 75th edition overall of the top national league competition.

Ten teams contested the league. Eight teams from the 1979–80 season (Aberdeen, Celtic, Dundee United, Kilmarnock, Morton, Partick Thistle, Rangers, and St Mirren) plus two clubs promoted from the 1979–80 Scottish First Division (Heart of Midlothian and Airdrieonians).

Aberdeen were the defending champions, having won their first title in 25 years in the previous season.

The title was won by Celtic on 22 April 1981, after defeating Dundee United 3–2 at Tannadice Park, with two matches still to play. They finished seven points ahead of closest challengers Aberdeen. At the end of the season, Kilmarnock and Heart of Midlothian were relegated.

== Table ==
Pos	Team	Pld	W	D	L	GF	GA	GD	Pts	Qualification or relegation
1	Celtic (C)	36	26	4	6	84	37	+47	56	Qualification for the European Cup first round
2	Aberdeen	36	19	11	6	61	26	+35	49	Qualification for the UEFA Cup first round
3	Rangers	36	16	12	8	60	32	+28	44	Qualification for the Cup Winners' Cup first round
4	St Mirren	36	18	8	10	56	47	+9	44	
5	Dundee United	36	17	9	10	66	42	+24	43	Qualification for the UEFA Cup first round
6	Partick Thistle	36	10	10	16	32	48	−16	30	
7	Airdrieonians	36	10	9	17	36	55	−19	29	
8	Morton	36	10	8	18	36	58	−22	28	
9	Kilmarnock (R)	36	5	9	22	23	65	−42	19	Relegation to the 1981–82 Scottish First Division
10	Heart of Midlothian (R)	36	6	6	24	27	71	−44	18	Relegation to the 1981–82 Scottish First Division

Source: Statto
Rules for classification: 1) points; 2) goal difference; 3) number of goals scored.
(C) Champions; (R) Relegated

== Results ==
=== Matches 1–18 ===
During matches 1–18 each team plays every other team twice (home and away).

Home \ Away	ABE	AIR	CEL	DNU	HEA	KIL	MOR	PAR	RAN	STM
Aberdeen		4–1	2–2	1–1	4–1	2–0	6–0	2–1	2–0	3–2
Airdrieonians	0–4		1–4	0–0	3–0	1–0	1–0	0–0	1–1	1–2
Celtic	0–2	1–1		2–0	3–2	4–1	2–1	4–1	1–2	1–2
Dundee United	1–3	1–0	0–3		1–1	2–2	1–1	0–0	2–4	2–0
Heart of Midlothian	0–1	0–2	0–2	0–3		2–0	0–1	0–1	0–0	1–1
Kilmarnock	1–1	1–1	0–3	0–1	0–1		3–3	0–1	1–8	1–6
Morton	1–0	3–1	2–3	0–2	2–2	2–0		1–2	2–2	1–4
Partick Thistle	0–1	2–1	0–1	2–3	3–2	0–1	0–0		1–1	1–0
Rangers	1–1	0–0	3–0	1–4	3–1	2–0	0–1	4–0		2–0
St Mirren	0–1	2–2	0–2	2–0	1–3	2–0	1–1	1–0	0–0	

Legend: Blue = home team win; Yellow = draw; Red = away team win.

=== Matches 19–36 ===
During matches 19–36 each team plays every other team twice (home and away).

Home \ Away	ABE	AIR	CEL	DNU	HEA	KIL	MOR	PAR	RAN	STM
Aberdeen		3–0	4–1	1–1	1–0	0–2	0–1	3–1	0–0	1–2
Airdrieonians	0–0		1–2	0–5	1–2	3–0	3–2	2–0	1–1	0–2
Celtic	1–1	2–1		2–1	6–0	1–1	3–0	4–1	3–1	7–0
Dundee United	0–0	4–1	2–3		4–1	7–0	1–0	3–2	2–1	1–2
Heart of Midlothian	0–2	2–3	0–3	0–4		1–0	0–0	1–1	2–1	1–2
Kilmarnock	1–0	0–1	1–2	0–1	2–0		0–0	0–1	1–1	2–0
Morton	1–3	0–1	0–3	2–0	3–0	1–0		2–0	0–2	1–3
Partick Thistle	1–1	1–0	0–1	0–2	1–0	1–1	3–1		1–1	0–0
Rangers	1–0	2–0	0–1	2–1	4–0	2–0	4–0	1–1		1–0
St Mirren	1–1	2–1	3–1	3–3	2–1	1–1	2–0	3–2	2–1	

Legend: Blue = home team win; Yellow = draw; Red = away team win.

== Awards ==
Award	Winner	Club
PFA Players' Player of the Year	(Scotland) Mark McGhee	Aberdeen
PFA Young Player of the Year	(Scotland) Charlie Nicholas	Celtic
SFWA Footballer of the Year	(Scotland) Alan Rough	Partick Thistle
