= 1974–75 Celtic F.C. season =

Celtic
1974–75 season
- Manager: Jock Stein
- Stadium: Celtic Park
- Scottish Division One: 3rd
- Scottish Cup: Winners
- Scottish League Cup: Winners
- European Cup: 1st round
- Drybrough Cup: Winners

During the 1974–75 Scottish football season, Celtic competed in Scottish Division One.

After winning the Scottish League an unprecedented nine times in a row, Celtic dropped to third place as they finished eleven points behind champions Rangers.

Nevertheless, it was a successful season for the club as it won two major honours: the Scottish Cup after defeating Airdrieonians 3-1 in the final, and the Scottish League Cup after they beat Hibernian 6-3.

Their European Cup campaign was cut short as they were eliminated in the first round by Greek champions Olympiacos, 1-3 on aggregate.

This was the final season as a player and captain for Billy McNeill, who would later go on to manage Celtic in two separate spells between 1978 and 1991.

== Squad ==
Note: Flags indicate national team as defined under FIFA eligibility rules; some limited exceptions apply. Players may hold more than one non-FIFA nationality.

No.	Pos.	Nation	Player
—	GK	SCO	Denis Connaghan
—	GK	SCO	Ally Hunter
—	GK	ENG	Peter Latchford
—	GK	SCO	Graham Barclay
—	DF	SCO	Billy McNeill (c)
—	DF	SCO	Jim Brogan
—	DF	SCO	Jimmy Quinn
—	DF	SCO	Danny McGrain
—	DF	SCO	Andy Lynch
—	DF	SCO	Pat McCluskey
—	DF	SCO	Frank Welsh
—	DF	SCO	Roddie MacDonald
—	DF	SCO	Jackie McNamara Sr.
—	MF	SCO	George Connelly

No.	Pos.	Nation	Player
—	MF	SCO	Lou Macari
—	MF	SCO	Tommy Callaghan
—	MF	SCO	Vic Davidson
—	MF	SCO	Brian McLaughlin
—	MF	SCO	Tommy Burns
—	MF	SCO	Steve Murray
—	MF	SCO	Ronnie Glavin
—	FW	SCO	Jimmy Johnstone
—	FW	SCO	Bobby Lennox
—	FW	SCO	Harry Hood
—	FW	SCO	Kenny Dalglish
—	FW	SCO	Dixie Deans
—	FW	SCO	Paul Wilson
—	FW	SCO	Andy Ritchie

== Competitions ==
=== Scottish Division One ===
==== League table ====
Pos	Team	Pld	W	D	L	GF	GA	GD	Pts	Qualification
1	Rangers (C)	34	25	6	3	86	33	+53	56	Qualification to European Cup first round
2	Hibernian	34	20	9	5	69	37	+32	49	Qualification to UEFA Cup First round
3	Celtic	34	20	5	9	81	41	+40	45	Qualification to European Cup Winners' Cup First round
4	Dundee United	34	19	7	8	72	43	+29	45	Qualification to UEFA Cup First round
5	Aberdeen	34	16	9	9	66	43	+23	41	

Source: Soccerbase and League Tables
(C) Champions

==== Matches ====
31 August 1974 Division One	Celtic	5–0	Kilmarnock	Glasgow
15:00				Stadium: Celtic Park; Attendance: 26,482

7 September 1974 Division One	Clyde	2–4	Celtic	Glasgow
15:00				Stadium: Shawfield Stadium; Attendance: 12,685

14 September 1974 Division One	Celtic	1–2	Rangers	Glasgow
15:00				Stadium: Celtic Park; Attendance: 65,887

21 September 1974 Division One	Motherwell	1–2	Celtic	Motherwell
15:00				Stadium: Fir Park; Attendance: 13,113

28 September 1974 Division One	Celtic	5–3	Ayr United	Glasgow
15:00 BST				Stadium: Celtic Park; Attendance: 18,785

5 October 1974 Division One	Dumbarton	1–3	Celtic	Dumbarton
15:00 BST				Stadium: Boghead Park; Attendance: 11,808

12 October 1974 Division One	Celtic	1–0	Arbroath	Glasgow
15:00 BST				Stadium: Celtic Park; Attendance: 14,959

19 October 1974 Division One	Celtic	5–0	Hibernian	Glasgow
15:00 BST				Stadium: Celtic Park; Attendance: 37,605

2 November 1974 Division One	Celtic	1–0	Aberdeen	Glasgow
15:00 BST				Stadium: Celtic Park; Attendance: 28,353

6 November 1974 Division One	Partick Thistle	1–2	Celtic	Glasgow
19:30 BST				Stadium: Firhill Park; Attendance: 15,510

9 November 1974 Division One	Dundee United	0–0	Celtic	Dundee
15:00 BST				Stadium: Tannadice Park; Attendance: 15,821

16 November 1974 Division One	Celtic	6–0	Airdrieonians	Glasgow
15:00 BST				Stadium: Celtic Park; Attendance: 25,222

23 November 1974 Division One	Hearts	1–1	Celtic	Edinburgh
15:00 GMT				Stadium: Tynecastle Park; Attendance: 21,878

30 November 1974 Division One	Morton	0–1	Celtic	Greenock
15:00 GMT				Stadium: Cappielow Park; Attendance: 11,367

7 December 1974 Division One	Celtic	2–1	Dunfermline Athletic	Glasgow
15:00 GMT				Stadium: Celtic Park; Attendance: 18,423

14 December 1974 Division One	Dundee	0–6	Celtic	Dundee
15:00 GMT				Stadium: Dens Park; Attendance: 14,901

21 December 1974 Division One	Celtic	3–1	St Johnstone	Glasgow
15:00 GMT				Stadium: Celtic Park; Attendance: 19,226

28 December 1974 Division One	Kilmarnock	0–1	Celtic	Kilmarnock
15:00 GMT				Stadium: Rugby Park; Attendance: 17,464

1 January 1975 Division One	Celtic	5–1	Clyde	Glasgow
15:00 GMT				Stadium: Celtic Park; Attendance: 18,615

4 January 1975 Division One	Rangers	3–0	Celtic	Glasgow
15:00 GMT				Stadium: Ibrox Park; Attendance: 70,638

11 January 1975 Division One	Celtic	2–3	Motherwell	Glasgow
15:00 GMT				Stadium: Celtic Park; Attendance: 25,188

18 January 1975 Division One	Ayr United	1–5	Celtic	Ayr
15:00 GMT				Stadium: Somerset Park; Attendance: 14,288

8 February 1975 Division One	Arbroath	2–2	Celtic	Arbroath
15:00 GMT				Stadium: Gayfield Park; Attendance: 7,512

11 February 1975 Division One	Celtic	2–2	Dumbarton	Glasgow
19:30 GMT				Stadium: Celtic Park; Attendance: 13,838

22 February 1975 Division One	Hibernian	2–1	Celtic	Edinburgh
15:00 GMT				Stadium: Easter Road; Attendance: 29,354

1 March 1975 Division One	Celtic	3–2	Partick Thistle	Glasgow
15:00 GMT				Stadium: Celtic Park; Attendance: 20,572

12 March 1975 Division One	Aberdeen	3–2	Celtic	Aberdeen
19:30 GMT				Stadium: Pittodrie Stadium; Attendance: 16,374

15 March 1975 Division One	Celtic	0–1	Dundee United	Glasgow
15:00 GMT				Stadium: Celtic Park; Attendance: 18,711

22 March 1975 Division One	Airdrieonians	1–0	Celtic	Airdrie
15:00 GMT				Stadium: Broomfield Park; Attendance: 9,688

29 March 1975 Division One	Celtic	4–1	Hearts	Glasgow
15:00 GMT				Stadium: Celtic Park; Attendance: 20,143

5 April 1975 Division One	Celtic	1–1	Morton	Glasgow
15:00 BST				Stadium: Celtic Park; Attendance: 11,816

12 April 1975 Division One	Dunfermline Athletic	1–3	Celtic	Dunfermline
15:00 BST				Stadium: East End Park; Attendance: 7,563

19 April 1975 Division One	Celtic	1–2	Dundee	Glasgow
15:00 BST				Stadium: Celtic Park; Attendance: 12,355

26 April 1975 Division One	St Johnstone	2–1	Celtic	Perth
15:00 BST				Stadium: Muirton Park; Attendance: 8,967

=== Scottish Cup ===
25 January 1975 Third round	Hibernian	0–2	Celtic	Edinburgh
15:00 GMT				Stadium: Easter Road; Attendance: 36,321

15 February 1975 Fourth round	Celtic	4–1	Clydebank	Glasgow
15:00 GMT				Stadium: Celtic Park; Attendance: 21,000

8 March 1975 Fifth round	Dumbarton	1–2	Celtic	Dumbarton
15:00 GMT				Stadium: Boghead Park; Attendance: 16,000

2 April 1975 Semi-final	Celtic	1–0	Dundee	Glasgow
19:30 GMT				Stadium: Hampden Park; Attendance: 40,629

3 May 1975 Final	Celtic	3–1	Airdrieonians	Glasgow
15:00 GMT				Stadium: Hampden Park; Attendance: 75,257

=== Scottish League Cup ===
10 August 1974 Group 4	Celtic	2–1	Motherwell	Glasgow
15:00 GMT				Stadium: Celtic Park; Attendance: 25,651

14 August 1974 Group 4	Ayr United	3–2	Celtic	Ayr
19:30 GMT				Stadium: Somerset Park; Attendance: 7,766

17 August 1974 Group 4	Celtic	1–0	Dundee United	Glasgow
15:00 GMT				Stadium: Celtic Park; Attendance: 24,324

21 August 1974 Group 4	Celtic	5–2	Ayr United	Glasgow
19:30 GMT				Stadium: Celtic Park; Attendance: 15,577

24 August 1974 Group 4	Dundee United	0–1	Celtic	Dundee
15:00 GMT				Stadium: Tannadice Park; Attendance: 15,308

28 August 1974 Group 4	Motherwell	2–2	Celtic	Motherwell
19:30 GMT				Stadium: Fir Park; Attendance: 8,747

11 September 1974 Quarter-final 1st leg	Celtic	2–0	Hamilton Academical	Glasgow
19:30 GMT				Stadium: Celtic Park; Attendance: 9,351

25 September 1974 Quarter-final 2nd leg	Hamilton Academical	2–4 (2–6 agg.)	Celtic	Hamilton
19:30 GMT				Stadium: Douglas Park; Attendance: 9,773

9 October 1974 Semi-final	Airdrieonians	0–1	Celtic	Glasgow
19:30 GMT				Stadium: Hampden Park; Attendance: 19,332

26 October 1974 Final	Hibernian	3–6	Celtic	Glasgow
15:00 GMT				Stadium: Hampden Park; Attendance: 53,838

=== European Cup ===
18 September 1974 1st round 2nd leg	Celtic (Scotland)	1–1	(Greece) Olympiacos Piraeus	Glasgow
20:00 GMT				Stadium: Celtic Park; Attendance: 36,828

2 October 1974 1st round 1st leg	Olympiacos Piraeus (Greece)	2–0 (3–1 agg.)	(Scotland) Celtic	Piraeus
19:00 GMT				Stadium: Karaiskakis Stadium; Attendance: 41,000

=== Drybrough Cup ===
27 July 1974 First round	Airdrieonians	2–4	Celtic	Airdrie
15:00 BST				Stadium: Broomfield Park; Attendance: 15,000

31 July 1974 Semi-final	Dundee	1–2 (aet)	Celtic	Dundee
19:30 BST				Stadium: Dens Park; Attendance: 14,354

3 August 1974 Final	Celtic	2–2 (aet)	Rangers	Glasgow
15:00 BST				Stadium: Hampden Park; Attendance: 57,558

=== Glasgow Cup ===
19 March 1975 Semi-final	Celtic	1–0	Partick Thistle	Glasgow
19:30 BST				Stadium: Celtic Park; Attendance: 7,000

10 May 1975 Final	Celtic	2–2	Rangers	Glasgow
15:00 BST				Stadium: Hampden Park; Attendance: 70,494

Replay not played

== See also ==
- Nine in a row
