= 1970–71 Celtic F.C. season =

Celtic
1970–71 season
- Manager: Jock Stein
- Stadium: Celtic Park
- Scottish Division One: 1st
- Scottish Cup: Winners
- Scottish League Cup: Finalists
- European Cup: Quarter-finalists

During the 1970–71 Scottish football season, Celtic competed in Scottish Division One. Celtic won the league to equal their 1905-1910 run of six-in-a-row, which was a Scottish record at the time. They also won the Scottish Cup for the 21st time, their fourth in seven seasons.

== Squad ==
Note: Flags indicate national team as defined under FIFA eligibility rules; some limited exceptions apply. Players may hold more than one non-FIFA nationality.

No.	Pos.	Nation	Player
—	GK	SCO	John Fallon
—	GK	SCO	Evan Williams
—	DF	SCO	Jim Craig
—	DF	SCO	Tommy Gemmell
—	DF	SCO	Davie Cattanach
—	DF	SCO	Billy McNeill
—	DF	SCO	Jim Brogan
—	DF	SCO	Jimmy Quinn
—	DF	SCO	Danny McGrain
—	MF	SCO	Bobby Murdoch
—	MF	SCO	David Hay
—	MF	SCO	John Clark
—	MF	SCO	George Connelly

No.	Pos.	Nation	Player
—	MF	SCO	Lou Macari
—	MF	SCO	Tommy Callaghan
—	MF	SCO	Bertie Auld
—	MF	SCO	Vic Davidson
—	FW	SCO	Jimmy Johnstone
—	FW	SCO	Stevie Chalmers
—	FW	SCO	Willie Wallace
—	FW	SCO	Bobby Lennox
—	FW	SCO	Harry Hood
—	FW	SCO	John Yogi Hughes
—	FW	SCO	Kenny Dalglish
—	FW	ENG	Steve Hancock

== Competitions ==
=== Scottish Division One ===
==== League table ====
Pos	Team	Pld	W	D	L	GF	GA	GD	Pts	Qualification or relegation
1	Celtic	34	25	6	3	89	23	+66	56	Champion
2	Aberdeen	34	24	6	4	68	18	+50	54	
3	St Johnstone	34	19	6	9	59	44	+15	44	
4	Rangers	34	16	9	9	58	34	+24	41	
5	Dundee	34	14	10	10	53	45	+8	38	

Source: Soccerbase and League Tables

==== Matches ====
29 August 1970 Division One	Celtic	2–0	Morton	Glasgow
15:00				Stadium: Celtic Park; Attendance: 32,274

5 September 1970 Division One	Clyde	0–5	Celtic	Glasgow
15:00				Stadium: Shawfield Stadium; Attendance: 15,446

12 September 1970 Division One	Celtic	2–0	Rangers	Glasgow
15:00				Stadium: Celtic Park; Attendance: 70,656

19 September 1970 Division One	Hibernian	2–0	Celtic	Edinburgh
15:00				Stadium: Easter Road; Attendance: 36,423

26 September 1970 Division One	Celtic	3–0	Dundee	Glasgow
15:00 BST				Stadium: Celtic Park; Attendance: 25,665

3 October 1970 Division One	Dunfermline Athletic	0–2	Celtic	Dunfermline
15:00 BST				Stadium: East End Park; Attendance: 15,409

10 October 1970 Division One	Celtic	1–0	St Johnstone	Glasgow
15:00 BST				Stadium: Celtic Park; Attendance: 35,542

17 October 1970 Division One	Airdrieonians	1–3	Celtic	Airdrie
15:00 BST				Stadium: Broomfield Park; Attendance: 18,158

28 October 1970 Division One	Celtic	3–2	Hearts	Glasgow
19:30 BST				Stadium: Celtic Park; Attendance: 16,795

31 October 1970 Division One	Motherwell	0–5	Celtic	Motherwell
15:00 BST				Stadium: Fir Park; Attendance: 13,007

7 November 1970 Division One	Celtic	3–0	Cowdenbeath	Glasgow
15:00 GMT				Stadium: Celtic Park; Attendance: 20,537

14 November 1970 Division One	Celtic	3–0	Kilmarnock	Glasgow
15:00 GMT				Stadium: Celtic Park; Attendance: 24,410

21 November 1970 Division One	Falkirk	0–0	Celtic	Falkirk
15:00 GMT				Stadium: Brockville Park; Attendance: 16,950

28 November 1970 Division One	Celtic	3–0	St. Mirren	Glasgow
15:00 GMT				Stadium: Celtic Park; Attendance: 22,362

5 December 1970 Division One	Dundee United	1–2	Celtic	Dundee
15:00 GMT				Stadium: Tannadice Park; Attendance: 16,434

12 December 1970 Division One	Celtic	0–1	Aberdeen	Glasgow
14:50 GMT				Stadium: Celtic Park; Attendance: 60,956

19 December 1970 Division One	Ayr United	1–2	Celtic	Ayr
15:00 GMT				Stadium: Somerset Park; Attendance: 12,975

26 December 1970 Division One	Morton	0–3	Celtic	Greenock
15:00 GMT				Stadium: Cappielow Park; Attendance: 14,293

2 January 1971 Division One	Rangers	1–1	Celtic	Glasgow
15:00 GMT				Stadium: Ibrox Park; Attendance: 80,453

9 January 1971 Division One	Celtic	2–1	Hibernian	Glasgow
15:00 GMT				Stadium: Celtic Park; Attendance: 25,797

16 January 1971 Division One	Dundee	1–8	Celtic	Dundee
15:00 GMT				Stadium: Dens Park; Attendance: 20,169

30 January 1971 Division One	Celtic	1–0	Dunfermline Athletic	Glasgow
15:00 GMT				Stadium: Celtic Park; Attendance: 22,722

6 February 1971 Division One	St Johnstone	3–2	Celtic	Perth
15:00 GMT				Stadium: Muirton Park; Attendance: 14,809

20 February 1971 Division One	Celtic	4–1	Airdrieonians	Glasgow
15:00 GMT				Stadium: Celtic Park; Attendance: 24,623

27 February 1971 Division One	Heart of Midlothian	1–1	Celtic	Edinburgh
15:00 GMT				Stadium: Tynecastle Park; Attendance: 23,464

13 March 1971 Division One	Cowdenbeath	1–5	Celtic	Cowdenbeath
15:00 GMT				Stadium: Central Park; Attendance: 8,331

20 March 1971 Division One	Kilmarnock	1–4	Celtic	Kilmarnock
15:00 GMT				Stadium: Rugby Park; Attendance: 17,075

27 March 1971 Division One	Celtic	4–0	Falkirk	Glasgow
15:00 GMT				Stadium: Celtic Park; Attendance: 19,438

10 April 1971 Division One	Celtic	1–1	Dundee United	Glasgow
15:00 GMT				Stadium: Celtic Park; Attendance: 28,894

12 April 1971 Division One	Celtic	3–0	Motherwell	Glasgow
19:30 GMT				Stadium: Celtic Park; Attendance: 20,765

17 April 1971 Division One	Aberdeen	1–1	Celtic	Aberdeen
15:00 BST				Stadium: Pittodrie Stadium; Attendance: 36,000

27 April 1971 Division One	St Mirren	2–2	Celtic	Paisley
19:30 BST				Stadium: St Mirren Park, Love Street; Attendance: 14,546

29 April 1971 Division One	Celtic	2–0	Ayr United	Glasgow
19:30 BST				Stadium: Hampden Park; Attendance: 20,738

1 May 1971 Division One	Celtic	6–1	Clyde	Glasgow
15:00 BST				Stadium: Celtic Park; Attendance: 31,822

=== Scottish Cup ===
23 January 1971 Third round	Celtic	5–1	Queen of the South	Glasgow
15:00 GMT				Stadium: Celtic Park; Attendance: 25,900

13 February 1971 Fourth round	Celtic	1–1	Dunfermline Athletic	Glasgow
15:00 GMT				Stadium: Celtic Park; Attendance: 37,000

17 February 1971 Fourth round replay	Dunfermline Athletic	0–1	Celtic	Dunfermline
19:45 GMT				Stadium: East End Park; Attendance: 22,728

6 March 1971 Fifth round	Celtic	7–1	Raith Rovers	Glasgow
15:00 GMT				Stadium: Celtic Park; Attendance: 32,000

3 April 1971 Semi-final	Celtic	3–3	Airdrieonians	Glasgow
15:00 GMT				Stadium: Hampden Park; Attendance: 39,408

7 April 1971 Semi-final replay	Celtic	2–0	Airdrieonians	Glasgow
19:45 GMT				Stadium: Hampden Park; Attendance: 47,186

8 May 1971 Final	Celtic	1–1	Rangers	Glasgow
15:00 GMT				Stadium: Hampden Park; Attendance: 120,027

12 May 1971 Final replay	Celtic	2–1	Rangers	Glasgow
19:30 GMT				Stadium: Hampden Park; Attendance: 103,297

=== Scottish League Cup ===
8 August 1970 Group 8	Hearts	1–2	Celtic	Edinburgh
15:00 GMT				Stadium: Tynecastle Park; Attendance: 30,849

12 August 1970 Group 8	Celtic	5–3	Clyde	Glasgow
19:30 GMT				Stadium: Celtic Park; Attendance: 23,468

15 August 1970 Group 8	Celtic	2–2	Dunde United	Glasgow
15:00 GMT				Stadium: Celtic Park; Attendance: 37,622

19 August 1970 Group 8	Clyde	0–2	Celtic	Glasgow
19:30 GMT				Stadium: Shawfield Stadium; Attendance: 15,112

22 August 1970 Group 8	Celtic	4–2	Hearts	Glasgow
15:00 GMT				Stadium: Celtic Park; Attendance: 38,643

26 August 1970 Group 8	Dundee United	2–2	Celtic	Glasgow
19:30 GMT				Stadium: Celtic Park; Attendance: 11,539

9 September 1970 Quarter-final 1st leg	Dundee	2–2	Celtic	Dundee
19:30 GMT				Stadium: Dens Park; Attendance: 20,933

23 September 1970 Quarter-final 2nd leg	Celtic	5–1 (7–3 agg.)	Dundee	Glasgow
19:30 GMT				Stadium: Celtic Park; Attendance: 38,151

7 October 1970 Semi-final	Dumbarton	0–0	Celtic	Glasgow
19:30 GMT				Stadium: Hampden Park; Attendance: 25,846

12 October 1970 Semi-final	Dumbarton	3–4	Celtic	Glasgow
19:30 GMT				Stadium: Hampden Park; Attendance: 32,666

24 October 1970 Final	Rangers	1–0	Celtic	Glasgow
15:00 GMT				Stadium: Hampden Park; Attendance: 106,263

=== European Cup ===
16 September 1970 1st round 1st leg	Celtic (Scotland)	9–0	(Finland) KPV Kokkolan Palloveikot	Glasgow
19:45 GMT				Stadium: Celtic Park; Attendance: 39,744

30 September 1970 1st round 2nd leg	KPV Kokkolan Palloveikot (Finland)	0–5 (0–14 agg.)	(Scotland) Celtic	Kokkola
14:00 GMT				Stadium: Kokkolan Keskuskenttä; Attendance: 5,096

21 October 1970 2nd round 1st leg	Waterford (Republic of Ireland)	0–7	(Scotland) Celtic	Dublin
16:00 GMT				Stadium: Lansdowne Road; Attendance: 41,486

4 November 1970 2nd round 2nd leg	Celtic (Scotland)	3–2 (10–2 agg.)	(Republic of Ireland) Waterford	Glasgow
20:00 GMT				Stadium: Celtic Park; Attendance: 16,160

10 March 1971 Quarter-final 1st leg	Ajax F.C. (Netherlands)	3–0	(Scotland) Celtic	Amsterdam
19:15 GMT				Stadium: Olympisch Stadion; Attendance: 54,862

24 March 1971 Quarter-final 2nd leg	Celtic (Scotland)	1–0 (1–3 agg.)	(Netherlands) Ajax F.C.	Glasgow
20:00 GMT				Stadium: Hampden Park; Attendance: 85,744

=== Glasgow Cup ===
30 March 1971 1st round	Partick Thistle	3–4	Celtic	Glasgow
19:30 BST				Stadium: Hampden Park; Attendance: 12,000

6 May 1971 Semi-final	Clyde	2–1	Celtic	Glasgow
19:30 BST				Stadium: Shawfield Stadium; Attendance: 3,500

== See also ==
- Nine in a row
