= 1971–72 Celtic F.C. season =

Celtic
1971–72 season
- Manager: Jock Stein
- Stadium: Celtic Park
- Scottish Division One: 1st
- Scottish Cup: Winners
- Scottish League Cup: Finalists
- European Cup: Semi-finalists
- Drybrough Cup: Finalists

During the 1971–72 Scottish football season, Celtic competed in Scottish Division One. Celtic won the Scottish League for the seventh time in a row, a record at the time. They also successfully retained the Scottish Cup. This was the seventh season in a row in which Celtic won at least two of the three major domestic honours in Scotland (League, Cup and League Cup), a record that has not been broken or equalled as of 2025.

== Squad ==
Note: Flags indicate national team as defined under FIFA eligibility rules; some limited exceptions apply. Players may hold more than one non-FIFA nationality.

No.	Pos.	Nation	Player
—	GK	SCO	Evan Williams
—	GK	ENG	Gordon Marshall
—	GK	SCO	Denis Connaghan
—	DF	SCO	Jim Craig
—	DF	SCO	Tommy Gemmell
—	DF	SCO	Billy McNeill
—	DF	SCO	Jim Brogan
—	DF	SCO	Jimmy Quinn
—	DF	SCO	Danny McGrain
—	MF	SCO	Bobby Murdoch
—	MF	SCO	David Hay
—	MF	SCO	George Connelly
—	MF	SCO	Lou Macari

No.	Pos.	Nation	Player
—	MF	SCO	Tommy Callaghan
—	MF	SCO	Vic Davidson
—	MF	SCO	Brian McLaughlin
—	FW	SCO	Jimmy Johnstone
—	FW	SCO	Willie Wallace
—	FW	SCO	Bobby Lennox
—	FW	SCO	Harry Hood
—	FW	SCO	John Yogi Hughes
—	FW	SCO	Kenny Dalglish
—	FW	SCO	Dixie Deans
—	FW	SCO	Paul Wilson
—	FW	ENG	Steve Hancock

== Competitions ==
=== Scottish Division One ===
==== League table ====
Pos	Team	Pld	W	D	L	GF	GA	GD	Pts	Qualification or relegation
1	Celtic	34	28	4	2	96	28	+68	60	Champion
2	Aberdeen	34	21	8	5	80	26	+54	50	
3	Rangers	34	21	2	11	71	38	+33	44	
4	Hibernian	34	19	6	9	62	34	+28	44	
5	Dundee	34	14	13	7	59	38	+21	41	

Source: Soccerbase and League Tables

==== Matches ====
4 September 1971 Division One	Celtic	9–1	Clyde	Glasgow
15:00				Stadium: Celtic Park; Attendance: 27,998

11 September 1971 Division One	Rangers	2–3	Celtic	Glasgow
15:00				Stadium: Ibrox Park; Attendance: 70,088

18 September 1971 Division One	Celtic	3–1	Morton	Glasgow
15:00				Stadium: Celtic Park; Attendance: 33,293

25 September 1971 Division One	Airdrieonians	0–5	Celtic	Airdrie
15:00				Stadium: Broomfield Park; Attendance: 17,238

2 October 1971 Division One	Celtic	0–1	St Johnstone	Glasgow
15:00 BST				Stadium: Celtic Park; Attendance: 37,573

9 October 1971 Division One	Hibernian	0–1	Celtic	Edinburgh
15:00 BST				Stadium: Easter Road; Attendance: 40,671

16 October 1971 Division One	Celtic	3–1	Dundee	Glasgow
15:00 BST				Stadium: Celtic Park; Attendance: 31,460

27 October 1971 Division One	Dunfermline Athletic	1–2	Celtic	Glasgow
19:30 BST				Stadium: Celtic Park; Attendance: 13,173

30 October 1971 Division One	Ayr United	0–1	Celtic	Ayr
15:00 BST				Stadium: Somerset Park; Attendance: 15,390

6 November 1971 Division One	Celtic	1–1	Aberdeen	Glasgow
15:00 BST				Stadium: Celtic Park; Attendance: 62,236

13 November 1971 Division One	Dundee United	1–5	Celtic	Dundee
15:00 GMT				Stadium: Tannadice Park; Attendance: 18,187

20 November 1971 Division One	Celtic	2–0	Falkirk	Glasgow
15:00 GMT				Stadium: Celtic Park; Attendance: 23,733

27 November 1971 Division One	Partick Thistle	1–5	Celtic	Glasgow
15:00 GMT				Stadium: Firhill Park; Attendance: 33,185

4 December 1971 Division One	Celtic	5–1	Kilmarnock	Glasgow
15:00 GMT				Stadium: Celtic Park; Attendance: 26,824

11 December 1971 Division One	Celtic	2–1	East Fife	Glasgow
15:00 GMT				Stadium: Celtic Park; Attendance: 21,253

18 December 1971 Division One	Motherwell	1–5	Celtic	Motherwell
15:00 GMT				Stadium: Fir Park; Attendance: 15,848

25 December 1971 Division One	Celtic	3–2	Heart of Midlothian	Glasgow
15:00 GMT				Stadium: Celtic Park; Attendance: 32,880

1 January 1972 Division One	Clyde	0–7	Celtic	Glasgow
15:00 GMT				Stadium: Shawfield Stadium; Attendance: 15,842

3 January 1972 Division One	Celtic	2–1	Rangers	Glasgow
15:00 GMT				Stadium: Celtic Park; Attendance: 66,751

8 January 1972 Division One	Morton	1–1	Celtic	Greenock
15:00 GMT				Stadium: Cappielow Park; Attendance: 14,579

15 January 1972 Division One	Celtic	2–0	Airdrieonians	Glasgow
15:00 GMT				Stadium: Celtic Park; Attendance: 26,016

22 January 1972 Division One	St Johnstone	0–3	Celtic	Perth
15:00 GMT				Stadium: Muirton Park; Attendance: 14,239

29 January 1972 Division One	Celtic	2–1	Hibernian	Glasgow
15:00 GMT				Stadium: Celtic Park; Attendance: 37,168

19 February 1972 Division One	Celtic	1–0	Dunfermline Athletic	Glasgow
15:00 GMT				Stadium: Celtic Park; Attendance: 24,384

4 March 1972 Division One	Celtic	2–0	Ayr United	Glasgow
15:00 GMT				Stadium: Celtic Park; Attendance: 22,159

11 March 1972 Division One	Aberdeen	1–1	Celtic	Aberdeen
15:00 GMT				Stadium: Pittodrie Stadium; Attendance: 33,695

25 March 1972 Division One	Falkirk	0–1	Celtic	Dundee
15:00 GMT				Stadium: Tannadice Park; Attendance: 13,145

1 April 1972 Division One	Celtic	3–1	Partick Thistle	Glasgow
15:00 GMT				Stadium: Celtic Park; Attendance: 27,757

8 April 1972 Division One	Kilmarnock	1–3	Celtic	Kilmarnock
15:00 GMT				Stadium: Rugby Park; Attendance: 12,620

15 April 1972 Division One	East Fife	0–3	Celtic	Methil
15:00 GMT				Stadium: Bayview Park; Attendance: 12,086

22 April 1972 Division One	Celtic	5–2	Motherwell	Glasgow
15:00 BST				Stadium: Celtic Park; Attendance: 18,573

25 April 1972 Division One	Celtic	3–0	Dundee United	Glasgow
15:00 BST				Stadium: Celtic Park; Attendance: 11,036

29 April 1972 Division One	Hearts	4–1	Celtic	Edinburgh
15:00 BST				Stadium: Tynecastle Park; Attendance: 10,124

1 May 1972 Division One	Dundee	1–1	Celtic	Dundee
19:30 BST				Stadium: Dens Park; Attendance: 10,755

=== Scottish Cup ===
5 February 1972 Third round	Celtic	5–0	Albion Rovers	Glasgow
15:00 GMT				Stadium: Celtic Park; Attendance: 20,212

26 February 1972 Fourth round	Celtic	4–0	Dundee	Glasgow
15:00 GMT				Stadium: Celtic Park; Attendance: 47,500

18 March 1972 Fifth round	Celtic	1–1	Heart of Midlothian	Glasgow
15:00 GMT				Stadium: Celtic Park; Attendance: 47,500

27 March 1972 Fifth round replay	Heart of Midlothian	0–1	Celtic	Edinburgh
19:45 GMT				Stadium: Tynecastle Park; Attendance: 40,029

12 April 1972 Semi-final	Celtic	3–1	Kilmarnock	Glasgow
19:30 GMT				Stadium: Hampden Park; Attendance: 48,307

6 May 1972 Final	Celtic	6–1	Hibernian	Glasgow
15:00 GMT				Stadium: Hampden Park; Attendance: 106,909

=== Scottish League Cup ===
14 August 1971 Group 8	Celtic	2–0	Rangers	Glasgow
15:00 GMT				Stadium: Ibrox Park; Attendance: 72,264

18 August 1971 Group 8	Morton	0–1	Celtic	Greenock
19:30 GMT				Stadium: Cappielow Park; Attendance: 16,231

21 August 1971 Group 8	Ayr United	0–3	Celtic	Ayr
15:00 GMT				Stadium: Somerset Park; Attendance: 17,699

25 August 1971 Group 8	Celtic	0–1	Morton	Glasgow
19:30 GMT				Stadium: Celtic Park; Attendance: 26,947

28 August 1971 Group 8	Rangers	0–3	Celtic	Glasgow
15:00 GMT				Stadium: Ibrox Park; Attendance: 73,995

30 August 1971 Group 8	Celtic	4–1	Ayr United	Glasgow
19:30 GMT				Stadium: Celtic Park; Attendance: 15,358

8 September 1971 Quarter-final 1st leg	Clydebank	0–5	Celtic	Clydebank
19:30 GMT				Stadium: Kilbowie Park; Attendance: 10,600

22 September 1971 Quarter-final 2nd leg	Celtic	6–2 (11 – 2 agg.)	Clydebank	Glasgow
19:30 GMT				Stadium: Celtic Park; Attendance: 15,045

6 October 1971 Semi-final	St Mirren	0–3	Celtic	Glasgow
19:30 GMT				Stadium: Hampden Park; Attendance: 29,488

23 October 1971 Final	Partick Thistle	4–1	Celtic	Glasgow
15:00 GMT				Stadium: Hampden Park; Attendance: 62,736

=== European Cup ===
15 September 1971 1st round 1st leg	B1903 Copenhagen (Denmark)	2–1	(Scotland) Celtic	Copenhagen
20:00 GMT				Stadium: Idrætsparken; Attendance: 6,600

29 September 1971 1st round 2nd leg	Celtic (Scotland)	3–0 (4–2 agg.)	(Denmark) B1903 Copenhagen	Glasgow
19:30 GMT				Stadium: Celtic Park; Attendance: 53,000

20 October 1971 2nd round 1st leg	Celtic (Scotland)	5–0	(Malta) Sliema Wanderers	Glasgow
20:00 GMT				Stadium: Celtic Park; Attendance: 29,000

3 November 1971 2nd round 2nd leg	Sliema Wanderers (Malta)	1–2 (1–7 agg.)	(Scotland) Celtic	Gżira
14:00 GMT				Stadium: Empire Stadium; Attendance: 10,416

8 March 1972 Quarter-final 1st leg	Ujpesti Dozsa (Hungary)	1–2	(Scotland) Celtic	Budapest
16:00 GMT				Stadium: Megyeri úti stadion Attendance: 25,064

22 March 1972 Quarter-final 2nd leg	Celtic (Scotland)	1–1 (3–2 agg.)	(Hungary) Ujpesti Dozsa	Glasgow
20:00 GMT				Stadium: Celtic Park; Attendance: 70,559

5 April 1972 Semi-final 1st leg	Inter Milan (Italy)	0–0	(Scotland) Celtic	Milan
20:00 GMT				Stadium: San Siro; Attendance: 85,000

19 April 1972 Semi-final 2nd leg	Celtic (Scotland)	0–0 (0–0 agg.) (4–5 p)	(Italy) Inter Milan	Glasgow
20:00 GMT				Stadium: Celtic Park; Attendance: 73,724

=== Drybrough Cup ===
31 July 1971 First round	Celtic	5–2	Dumbarton	Glasgow
15:00 BST				Stadium: Celtic Park; Attendance: 22,000

4 August 1971 Semi-final	Celtic	4–2	St Johnstone	Glasgow
19:30 BST				Stadium: Firhill Park; Attendance: 30,000

7 August 1971 Final	Aberdeen	2–1	Celtic	Aberdeen
15:00 BST				Stadium: Pittodrie Stadium; Attendance: 28,000

== See also ==
- Nine in a row
