= Kenny Dalglish =

Scottish footballer and manager (born 1951)

Sir Kenny Dalglish MBE
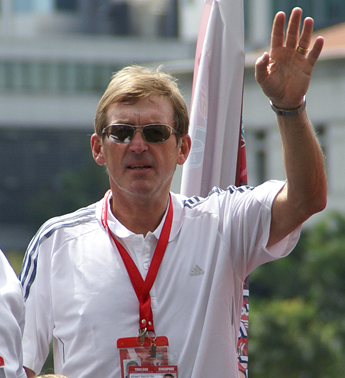
- Dalglish in 2009

Personal information
- Full name: Kenneth Mathieson Dalglish
- Date of birth: 4 March 1951 (age 75)
- Place of birth: Glasgow, Scotland
- Height: 5 ft 8 in (1.73 m)
- Position: Forward

Youth career
- 1967–1968: Cumbernauld United
- 1968–1969: Celtic

Senior career*
Years	Team	Apps	(Gls)
1969–1977	Celtic	204	(111)
1977–1990	Liverpool	355	(118)
Total		559	(229)

International career
1972–1976	Scotland U23	4	(2)
1971–1986	Scotland	102	(30)

Managerial career
- 1985–1991: Liverpool
- 1991–1995: Blackburn Rovers
- 1997–1998: Newcastle United
- 2000: Celtic (interim)
- 2011–2012: Liverpool
- * Club domestic league appearances and goals

Sir Kenneth Mathieson Dalglish (born 4 March 1951) is a Scottish former football player and manager. During his career, he made 338 appearances for Celtic and 515 for Liverpool, playing as a forward, and earned 102 caps for the Scotland national team, scoring 30 goals, also a joint record. Regarded as one of the greatest players of all time, Dalglish won the Ballon d'Or Silver Award in 1983, the PFA Players' Player of the Year in 1983, and the FWA Footballer of the Year in 1979 and 1983. In 2009, FourFourTwo magazine named Dalglish the greatest striker in post-war British football, and he has been inducted into both the Scottish and English Football Halls of Fame. He is highly regarded by Liverpool fans, who still affectionately refer to him as "King Kenny", and in 2006 voted him top of the fans' poll "100 Players Who Shook the Kop".

Dalglish began his career with Celtic in 1971, going on to win four Scottish league championships, four Scottish Cups and one Scottish League Cup with the club. In 1977, Liverpool manager Bob Paisley paid a British transfer record of £440,000 to take Dalglish to Liverpool. His years at Liverpool were among the club's most successful periods, as he won six English league championships, the FA Cup, four League Cups, five FA Charity Shields, three European Cups and one European Super Cup. At Liverpool he formed a formidable strike partnership with Ian Rush. In international football, Dalglish made 102 appearances and scored 30 goals for Scotland between 1971 and 1986, and is their joint-leading goal scorer (with Denis Law). He was chosen for Scotland's FIFA World Cup squads in 1974, 1978, 1982 and 1986, playing in all of those tournaments except the latter, due to injury. Overall, he made over 1,050 appearances in his career.

Dalglish became player-manager of Liverpool in 1985 after the resignation of Joe Fagan, winning a further three First Divisions, two FA Cups and four FA Charity Shields, before resigning in 1991. Eight months later, Dalglish made a return to football management with Blackburn Rovers, whom he led from the Second Division to win the Premier League in 1995. Soon afterwards, he stepped down as manager to become director of football at the club, before leaving altogether in 1996. In January 1997, Dalglish took over as manager at Newcastle United. Newcastle finished as runners-up in the Premier League during his first season, but they only finished 13th in 1997–98, which led to his dismissal the following season. Dalglish went on to be appointed director of football at Celtic in 1999, and later briefly manager. He won the Scottish League Cup in 2000 before his departure from the club that year.

Between 2000 and 2010, Dalglish focused on charitable concerns, founding The Marina Dalglish Appeal with his wife to raise money for cancer care. In January 2011, Dalglish returned to Liverpool for a spell as caretaker manager after the dismissal of Roy Hodgson, becoming the permanent manager in May 2011. Despite winning the League Cup, which was the club's first trophy since 2006, earning them a place in the UEFA Europa League, and reaching the FA Cup Final, Liverpool only finished 8th in the Premier League, and Dalglish was dismissed in May 2012. In October 2013, Dalglish returned to Liverpool as a non-executive director, and Anfield's Centenary Stand was renamed after him in October 2018.

== Early life ==
The son of an engineer, Dalglish was born in Dalmarnock in the east end of Glasgow and was brought up in Milton in the north of the city. When he was 14 the family moved to a newly built tower block in Ibrox overlooking the home ground of Rangers, the club he had grown up supporting.

Dalglish attended Miltonbank Primary School in Milton and started out as a goalkeeper. He then attended High Possil Senior Secondary School, where he won the inter-schools five-a-side and the inter-year five-a-side competitions. He won the Scottish Cup playing for Glasgow Schoolboys and Glasgow Schools, and was then selected for the Scottish schoolboys team that went undefeated in a Home Nations Victory Shield tournament. In 1966, Dalglish had unsuccessful trials at West Ham United and Liverpool.

== Club career ==
=== Celtic ===
Dalglish signed a professional contract with Celtic in May 1967. The club's assistant manager Sean Fallon went to see Dalglish and his parents at their home, which had Rangers-related pictures on the walls. In his first season, Dalglish was loaned out to Cumbernauld United, for whom he scored 37 goals. During this time he also worked as an apprentice joiner. Celtic manager Jock Stein wanted Dalglish to spend a second season at Cumbernauld, but the youngster wanted to turn professional. Dalglish got his wish and became a regular in the reserve team known as the Quality Street Gang, due to it containing a large number of highly rated players, including future Scottish internationals Danny McGrain, George Connelly, Lou Macari and David Hay. Dalglish made his first-team competitive debut for Celtic in a Scottish League Cup quarter-final tie against Hamilton Academical on 25 September 1968, coming on as a second-half substitute in a 4–2 win.

He spent the 1968–69 season playing for the reserves, though scored just four goals in 17 games. The following season he changed his position, moving into midfield, and enjoyed a good season as he helped the reserve team to the league and cup double, scoring 19 goals in 31 games. Stein put Dalglish in the starting XI for the first team in a league match against Raith Rovers on 4 October 1969. Celtic won 7–1 but Dalglish did not score, nor did he score in the next three first-team games he played in during the 1969–70 season.

Dalglish continued his goal-scoring form in the reserves into the next season, scoring 23 goals. A highlight of his season came in the Reserve Cup Final against Rangers; Dalglish scored one goal in a 4–1 win in the first leg, then in the second leg scored a hat-trick in a 6–1 win to clinch the cup. Still not a first-team regular, Dalglish was in the stands when the Ibrox disaster occurred at an Old Firm match in January 1971, when 66 Rangers fans died. On 17 May 1971, he played for Celtic against Kilmarnock in a testimonial match for the Rugby Park club's long serving midfielder Frank Beattie, and scored six goals in a 7–2 win for Celtic.

The 1971–72 season saw Dalglish finally establish himself in the Celtic first team,. He scored his first competitive goal for the first team on 14 August 1971, Celtic's second goal with a penalty kick in a 2–0 win over Rangers at Ibrox Stadium. He went on to score 29 goals in 53 games that season, including a hat-trick against Dundee and braces against Kilmarnock and Motherwell and helped Celtic win their seventh consecutive league title. Dalglish also played in Celtic's 6–1 win over Hibernian in the 1972 Scottish Cup Final. In 1972–73 Dalglish was Celtic's leading scorer, with 39 goals in all competitions, and the club won the league championship once again. Celtic won a league and cup double in 1973–74 and reached the semi-finals of the European Cup. The ties against Atlético Madrid were acrimonious, and Dalglish described the first leg in Glasgow where the Spanish side had three players sent off as "without doubt the worst game I have ever played in as far as violence is concerned." Dalglish won a further Scottish Cup winner's medal in 1975, providing the cross for Paul Wilson's opening goal in a 3–1 win over Airdrieonians in what transpired to be captain Billy McNeill's last match before retiring from playing football.

Dalglish was made Celtic captain in the 1975–76 season, during which the club failed to win a trophy for the first time in 12 years. Jock Stein had been badly injured in a car crash and missed most of that season while recovering from his injuries. Celtic won another league and cup double in 1976–77, with Dalglish scoring 27 goals in all competitions. On 10 August 1977, after making 320 appearances and scoring 167 goals for Celtic, Dalglish was signed by Liverpool manager Bob Paisley for a British transfer fee record of £440,000 (£2,585,000 today). The deal was unpopular with the Celtic fans, and Dalglish was booed by the crowd when he returned to Celtic Park in August 1978 to play in a testimonial match for Stein.

=== Liverpool ===
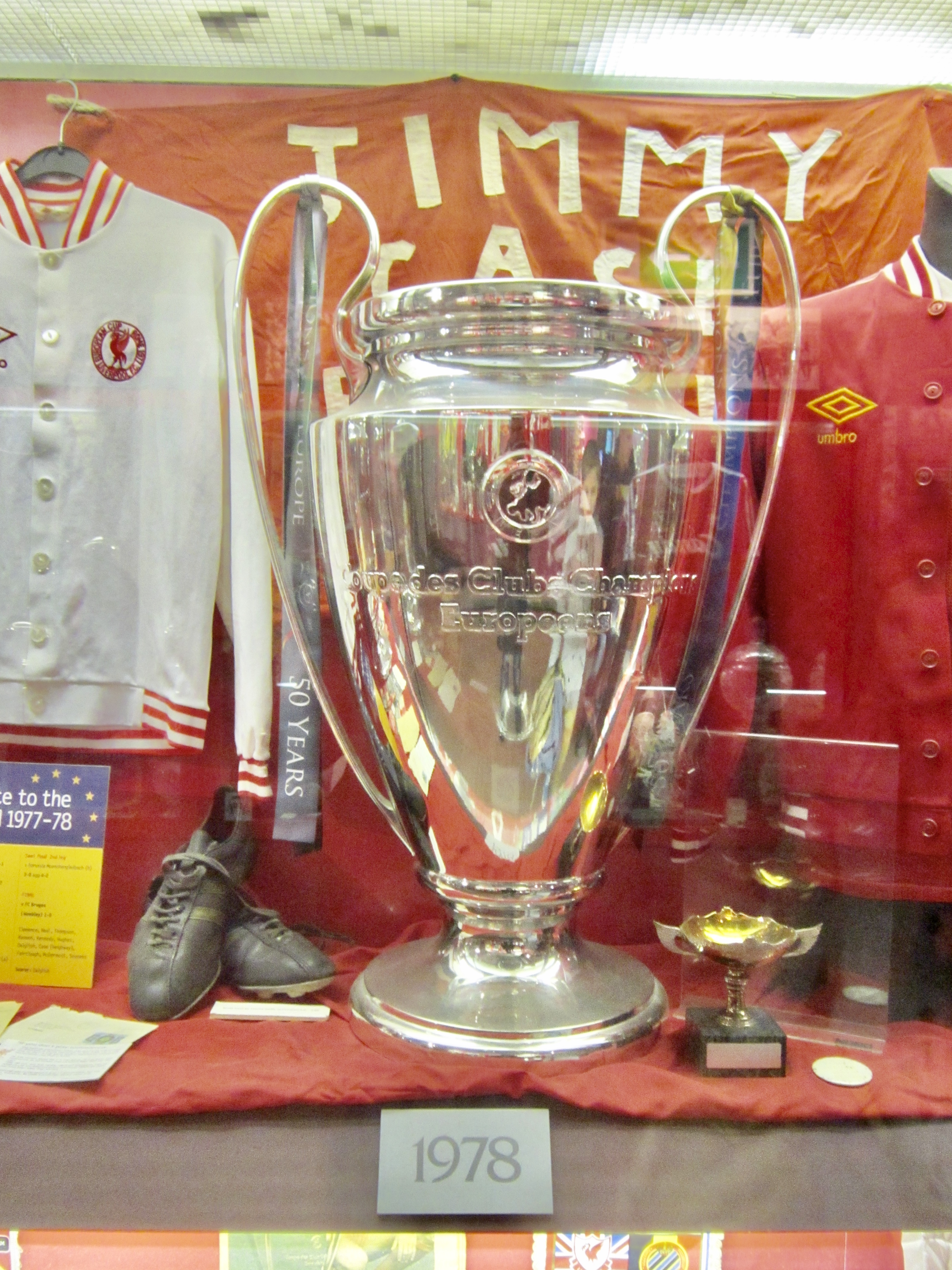
The 1978 European Cup in the Liverpool F.C. museum with Dalglish scoring the winner in the final

Dalglish was signed to replace Kevin Keegan and quickly settled into his new club. He made his Liverpool debut on 13 August 1977 in the season opener at Wembley, in the 1977 FA Charity Shield against Manchester United. He scored his first goal for Liverpool in his league debut a week later on 20 August at Middlesbrough. Dalglish also scored three days later on his Anfield debut in a 2–0 victory over Newcastle United, and he scored Liverpool's sixth goal when they beat Keegan's Hamburg 6–0 in the second leg of the 1977 European Super Cup. By the end of his first season with Liverpool, Dalglish had played 62 times and scored 31 goals, making him the club's leading scorer that season, which included scoring the winning goal in the 1978 European Cup final at Wembley against Bruges.

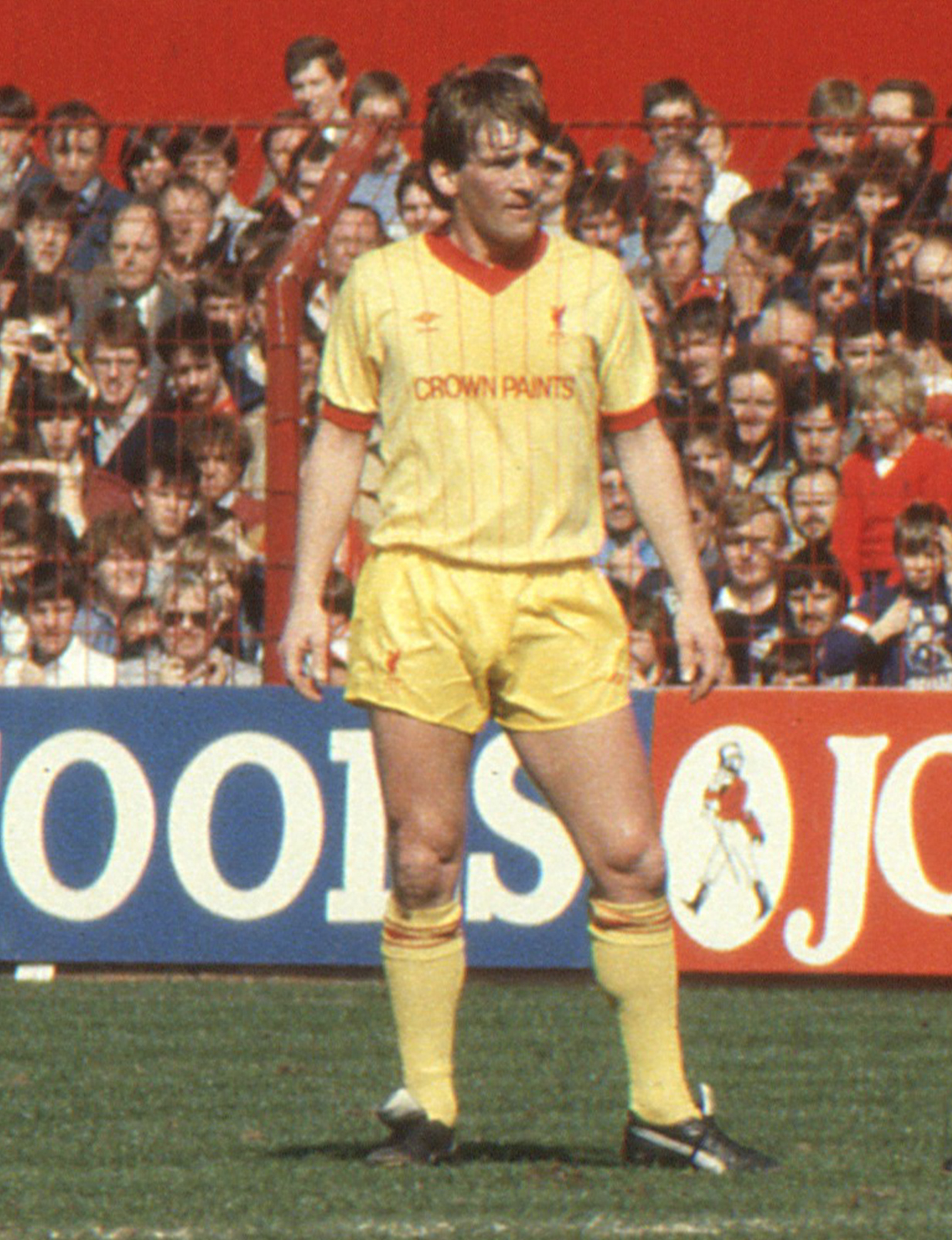
Dalglish playing for Liverpool in the 1980s

In his second season, Dalglish recorded a personal best of 21 league goals for the club and was also named Football Writers' Association Footballer of the Year. In the following seasons he did not miss a league game for Liverpool until the 1980–81 season, when he appeared in 34 out of 42 league games and scored only eight goals as Liverpool finished fifth in the league, but still won the European Cup and Football League Cup.

"They were brilliant because they were so different. Rushie was just incredible, the predator supreme. And what can you say about Kenny? People said he had ice in his head because in the furore of the heat of a match he would be like a computer pinging passes everywhere to open up the opposition."

— Journalist John Keith on the Rush-Dalglish strike partnership.

He recovered his goal-scoring form the following season, and was an ever-present player in the league once again, scoring 13 goals as Liverpool became league champions for the 13th time, and the third time since Dalglish's arrival. It was also around this time that he began to form a potent strike partnership with Ian Rush; Dalglish began to play just off Rush, "running riot in the extra space afforded to him in the hole". Dalglish was voted PFA Players' Player of the Year for the 1982–83 season, during which he scored 18 league goals as Liverpool retained their title. From 1983 Dalglish became less prolific as a goal-scorer, though he remained a regular player.

After becoming player-manager on the retirement of Joe Fagan in the 1985 close season and in the aftermath of the Heysel Stadium disaster, Dalglish selected himself for just 21 First Division games in 1985–86 as Liverpool won the double, with most of his starts coming in the crucial run-in in addition to the FA Cup final win over Everton. On the last day of the league season, his goal in a 1–0 away win over Chelsea gave Liverpool their 16th league title. In the 1986–87 season, Dalglish scored six goals in 18 league appearances, but by then he was committed to giving younger players priority for a first-team place.

With the sale of Rush to Juventus in 1987, Dalglish formed a new strike partnership of new signings John Aldridge and Peter Beardsley for the 1987–88 season, and he played only twice in a league campaign which saw Liverpool gain their 17th title. Dalglish did not play in Liverpool's 1988–89 campaign, and he made his final league appearance on 5 May 1990 as a substitute against Derby at Anfield on a night when Liverpool were presented the league trophy. At 39, Dalglish was one of the oldest players ever to play for Liverpool. His final goal had come three years earlier, in a 3–0 home league win over Nottingham Forest on 18 April 1987.

== International career ==
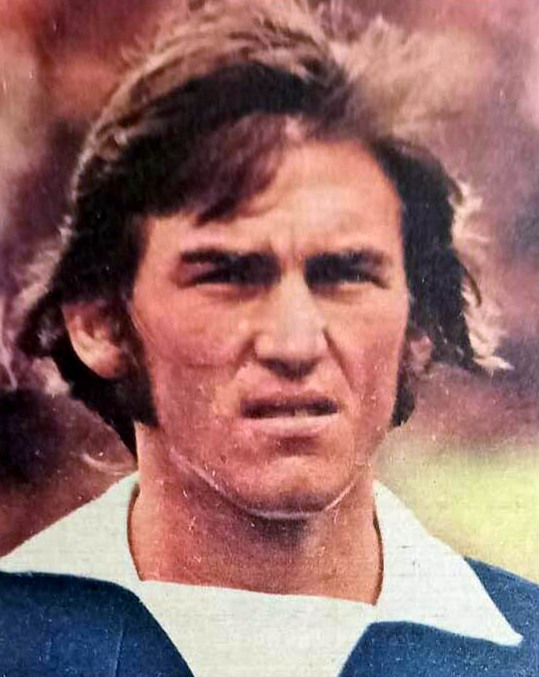
Dalglish with the Scotland national football team in 1974

Tommy Docherty gave Dalglish his debut for the Scottish national side as a substitute in the 1–0 Euro 1972 qualifier victory over Belgium on 10 November 1971 at Pittodrie. Dalglish scored his first goal for Scotland a year later on 15 November 1972 in the 2–0 World Cup qualifier win over Denmark at Hampden Park. Scotland would go on to qualify for the final tournament and he was part of Scotland's 1974 World Cup squad in West Germany. He started in all three games as Scotland were eliminated during the group stages despite not losing any of their three games.

On 15 May 1976, Dalglish scored the winning goal for Scotland at Hampden Park against England, by nutmegging Ray Clemence. A year later he scored against the same opponents and goalkeeper at Wembley, in another 2–1 win. Dalglish went on to play in both the 1978 World Cup in Argentina where he started in all of Scotland's games – scoring against eventual runners-up the Netherlands in a famous 3–2 win – and the 1982 World Cup in Spain, scoring against New Zealand. On both occasions Scotland failed to get past the group stage. Dalglish was selected for the 22-man squad travelling to Mexico for the 1986 World Cup, but had to withdraw due to injury.

Dalglish became the joint most-capped player for the Scotland men's team on 3 June 1978 when he played his 55th game against Peru in the group stage of the 1978 World Cup, equalling the record set by Denis Law in 1973, before making the record his own when he gained his 56th cap against Iran four days later. In total, Dalglish played 102 times for Scotland and scored 30 goals (a national record, which matched that set by Law). He became the first player to win 100 caps for Scotland in a friendly match against Romania on 26 March 1986 at Hampden Park. He was presented with the milestone cap by Franz Beckenbauer prior to kick off. His final appearance for Scotland, after 15 years as a full international, was on 12 November 1986 at Hampden in a Euro 1988 qualifying game against Luxembourg, which Scotland won 3–0. His 30th and final international goal had been two years earlier, on 14 November 1984, in a 3–1 win over Spain in a World Cup qualifier, also at Hampden Park.

For 40 years, Dalglish remained the only man to play 100 games for Scotland, until Andy Robertson reached the landmark against North Macedonia on 3 October 2026. Robertson later equalled and finally surpassed Dalglish's record in November 2026.

== Style of play ==
An intelligent and technically gifted forward, Dalglish is considered to be one of the greatest players in the history of Celtic and Liverpool. Renowned for his close control, vision, passing and movement, Dalglish operated as a second striker or withdrawn forward, occasionally dropping deep to link midfield with attack before moving into scoring positions. Dalglish's ability to hold the ball, create chances and combine with a traditional centre forward made him especially effective. Ian Rush, who established an incredible striking partnership with Dalglish, recalled that he could simply "run into space", knowing that Dalglish would find him.

Dalglish was also an accomplished finisher with either foot and possessed a remarkable understanding of space and timing, relying more on technique, anticipation and intelligence than physical power or pace. Dalglish's ability to finish and create chances for Rush allowed him to be both a goalscorer and the focal point of Liverpool's attack. Bob Paisley described Dalglish as the most talented player he had ever worked with. Commentator John Keith described Dalglish as having "ice in his head" and likened his passing abilities to a computer constantly finding ways through opponents.

== Managerial career ==
=== Liverpool ===
After the Heysel Stadium disaster in 1985 and Joe Fagan's subsequent resignation as manager, Dalglish became player-manager of Liverpool. His first signing was the midfield general Steve McMahon, filling the void left by the departure of Graeme Souness over a year earlier. In his first season in charge in 1985–86, he guided the club to its first "double". Liverpool achieved this by winning the League Championship by two points over Everton (Dalglish himself scored the winner in a 1–0 victory over Chelsea at Stamford Bridge to secure the title on the final day of the season), and the FA Cup by beating Everton in the final.

The 1986–87 season was trophyless for Liverpool. They lost 2–1 to Arsenal in the League Cup final at Wembley. Before the 1987–88 season, Dalglish signed two new players: striker Peter Beardsley from Newcastle and winger John Barnes from Watford. He had already purchased goalscorer John Aldridge from Oxford United (a replacement for Ian Rush, who was moving to Italy) in the spring of 1987 and early into the new campaign, bought Oxford United midfielder Ray Houghton. The new-look Liverpool side shaped by Dalglish topped the league for almost the entire season, and had a run of 37 matches unbeaten in all competitions (including 29 in the league; 22 wins and 7 draws) from the beginning of the season to 21 February 1988, when they lost to Everton in the league. Liverpool were crowned champions with four games left to play, having suffered just two defeats from 40 games. However, Dalglish's side lost the 1988 FA Cup final to underdogs Wimbledon.

In the summer of 1988, Dalglish re-signed Ian Rush. Liverpool beat Everton 3–2 after extra time in the second all-Merseyside FA Cup final in 1989, Rush scoring the winner, but was deprived of a second double in the final game of the season, when Arsenal secured a last-minute goal to take the title from Liverpool.

In the 1989–90 season Liverpool won their third league title under Dalglish. They missed out on the double and a third successive FA Cup final appearance when they lost 4–3 in extra-time to Crystal Palace in an FA Cup semi-final at Villa Park. At the end of the season Dalglish received his third Manager of the Year award. In 1991, one of his last acts as Liverpool manager was the signing of a future captain of the club, midfielder Jamie Redknapp.

Midway in the 1990–91 season, Dalglish resigned as manager of Liverpool on 22 February 1991, two days after a 4–4 draw with rivals Everton in an FA Cup fifth round tie at Goodison Park, in which Liverpool surrendered the lead four times. Daglish's resignation shocked the football community. Explaining his choice in a press conference, he said "I've been in the front line for 20 years, and it's just really a result of 20 years' active involvement in football at a very high and successful level, and Kenny Dalglish is a person that has pushed himself to the limit. It's a decision that many people will find difficult to understand, a decision that only I could have made. And it would have been wrong to mislead people that everything was fine with me." Johan Cruyff, echoing Dalglish, has noted "There is a time when you have been under pressure for 15 years when the stress begins to tell." Dalglish had been under immense stress, brought upon by the Heysel and Hillsborough disasters. At the time of Dalglish's departure, the club were three points ahead in the league and still in contention for the FA Cup. Seeing out the remainder of the season under Graeme Souness, Liverpool would be knocked out 1–0 by Everton in a FA Cup second replay and finish second in the league to Arsenal.

==== Hillsborough disaster ====
Dalglish was the manager of Liverpool at the time of the Hillsborough disaster on 15 April 1989. The disaster claimed 94 lives on the day, with the final death toll reaching 97. Dalglish attended many of the funerals of the victims, including four in one day. His presence in the aftermath of the disaster has been described as "colossal and heroic". Dalglish broke a twenty-year silence about the disaster in March 2009, expressing regret that the police and the FA did not consider delaying the kick-off of the match. During the Hillsborough Memorial Service on 15 April 2011, Liverpool MP Steve Rotheram announced he would submit an early day motion to have Dalglish knighted, "not only for his outstanding playing and managerial career, but also the charity work he has done with his wife, Marina, for breast cancer support and what he did after Hillsborough. It is common knowledge it affected him deeply".

=== Blackburn Rovers ===
Dalglish returned to management in October 1991 at Second Division Blackburn Rovers who had recently been purchased by multi-millionaire Jack Walker. By the turn of 1992 they were top of the Second Division, and then suffered a dip in form before recovering to qualify for the playoffs, during which Dalglish led Blackburn into the new Premier League by beating Leicester City 1–0 in the Second Division play-off final at Wembley. The resulting promotion meant that Blackburn were back in the top flight of English football for the first time since 1966. In the 1992 pre-season, Dalglish signed Southampton's Alan Shearer for a British record fee of £3.5 million. Despite a serious injury which ruled Shearer out for half the season, Dalglish achieved fourth position with the team in the first year of the new Premier League. The following year, Dalglish failed in an attempt to sign Roy Keane. Blackburn finished two positions higher the following season, as runners-up to Manchester United. By this time, Dalglish had added England internationals Tim Flowers and David Batty to his squad.

At the start of the 1994–95 season Dalglish paid a record £5 million for Chris Sutton, with whom Shearer formed an effective strike partnership. By the last game of the season, both Blackburn and Manchester United were in contention for the title. Blackburn had to travel to Liverpool, and Manchester United faced West Ham United in London. Blackburn lost 2–1, but still won the title since United failed to win in London. The title meant that Dalglish was only the fourth football manager in history to lead two different clubs to top-flight league championships in England, after Tom Watson, Herbert Chapman and Brian Clough. Dalglish became director of football at Blackburn in June 1995. He left the club at the start of the 1996–97 season after a disappointing campaign under his replacement and former assistant manager, Ray Harford.

Following his departure from Blackburn Dalglish was appointed for a brief spell as an "international talent scout" at his boyhood club Rangers. He was reported as having played a central role in the signing of Chile international Sebastián Rozental.

=== Newcastle United ===
In January 1997, Dalglish was appointed manager of Premier League side Newcastle United on a three-and-a-half-year contract, taking over from Kevin Keegan. Dalglish guided the club from fourth position to a runner-up spot in May and a place in the new format of the following season's UEFA Champions League. He then broke up the team which had finished second two years running, selling popular players like Peter Beardsley, Lee Clark, Les Ferdinand and David Ginola and replacing them with ageing stars like John Barnes (34), Ian Rush (36) and Stuart Pearce (35), as well as virtual unknowns like Des Hamilton and Garry Brady. He also made some good long-term signings like Gary Speed and Shay Given. The 1997–98 campaign saw Newcastle finish in only 13th place and, despite Dalglish achieving some notable successes during the season (including a 3–2 UEFA Champions League win over Barcelona and an FA Cup final appearance against Arsenal), he was dismissed by Freddie Shepherd after two draws in the opening two games of the subsequent 1998–99 season, and replaced by former Chelsea manager Ruud Gullit. One commentator from The Independent has since written, "His 20 months at Newcastle United are the only part of Kenny Dalglish's career that came anywhere near failure".

=== Celtic ===
In June 1999 he was appointed director of football operations at Celtic, with his former Liverpool player John Barnes appointed as head coach. Barnes was dismissed in February 2000 and Dalglish took charge of the first team on a temporary basis. He guided them to the Scottish League Cup final, where they beat Aberdeen 2–0 at Hampden Park. Dalglish was dismissed in June 2000, after the appointment of Martin O'Neill as manager. After a brief legal battle, Dalglish accepted a settlement of £600,000 from Celtic.

=== Return to Liverpool ===
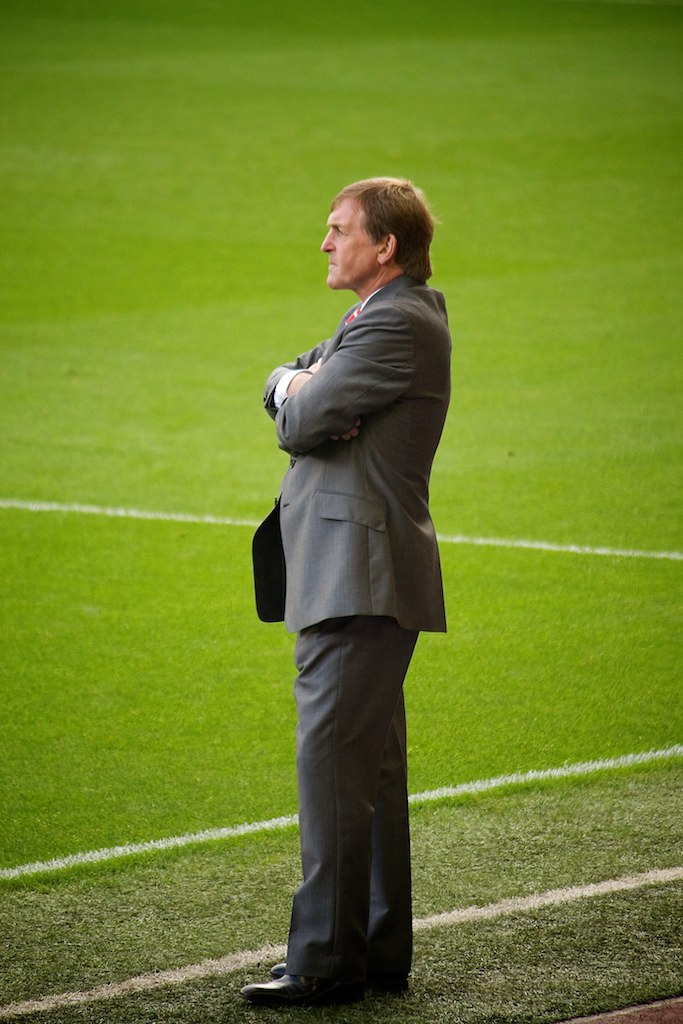
Dalglish managing Liverpool in 2011

In April 2009 Liverpool manager Rafael Benítez invited Dalglish to take up a role at the club's youth academy. The appointment was confirmed in July 2009, and Dalglish was also made the club's ambassador. Following Benítez's departure from Liverpool in June 2010, Dalglish was asked to help find a replacement, and in July Fulham's Roy Hodgson was appointed manager.

A poor run of results at the start of the 2010–11 season led to Liverpool fans calling for Dalglish's return as manager as early as October 2010, and with no subsequent improvement in Liverpool's results up to the end of the year (during which time the club was bought by New England Sports Ventures), Hodgson left Liverpool and Dalglish was appointed caretaker manager on 8 January 2011. Dalglish's first game in charge was on 9 January 2011 at Old Trafford against Manchester United in the 3rd round of the FA Cup, which Liverpool lost 1–0. Dalglish's first league game in charge was against Blackpool on 12 January 2011; Liverpool lost 2–1. After the game, Dalglish admitted that Liverpool faced "a big challenge".

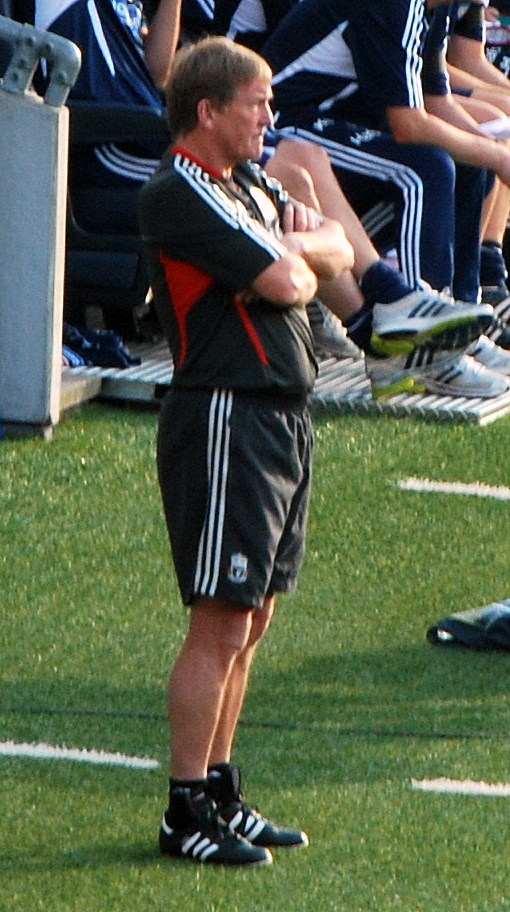
Dalglish in 2011

Shortly after his appointment, Dalglish indicated he would like the job on a permanent basis if it was offered to him, and on 19 January the Liverpool chairman Tom Werner stated that the club's owners would favour this option. On 22 January 2011, Dalglish led Liverpool to their first win since his return, against Wolves at Molineux. After signing Andy Carroll from Newcastle for a British record transfer fee of £35 million and Luis Suárez from Ajax for £22.8 million at the end of January (in the wake of Fernando Torres's sale to Chelsea for £50 million), some journalists noted that Dalglish had begun to assert his authority at the club. Following a 1–0 victory against Chelsea at Stamford Bridge in February 2011, described by Alan Smith as "a quite brilliant display in terms of discipline and spirit" and a "defensive masterplan" by David Pleat, Henry Winter wrote, "it can only be a matter of time before he [Dalglish] is confirmed as long-term manager".

On 12 May 2011, Liverpool announced that Dalglish had been given a three-year contract. His first official match in charge was 2–0 defeat to Harry Redknapp's Spurs at Anfield. Dalglish's second stint in charge at Anfield proved controversial at times. The Scot defended Luis Suárez in the wake of the striker's eight-match ban for racially abusing Manchester United defender Patrice Evra when the teams met in October 2011. After the Uruguayan's apparent refusal to shake Evra's hand in the return fixture in February 2012, an apology from both player and manager came only after the intervention of the owners.

In February 2012, Dalglish led Liverpool to their first trophy in six years, with victory in the 2011–12 Football League Cup. In the same season he also led Liverpool to the 2012 FA Cup Final where they lost 2–1 to Chelsea. Despite the success in domestic cups, Liverpool finished eighth in the league, their worst showing in the league since 1994, failing to qualify for the Champions League for a third straight season. Following the end of the season, Liverpool dismissed Dalglish on 16 May 2012. In October 2013, Dalglish returned to Liverpool as a non-executive director.

== Personal life ==
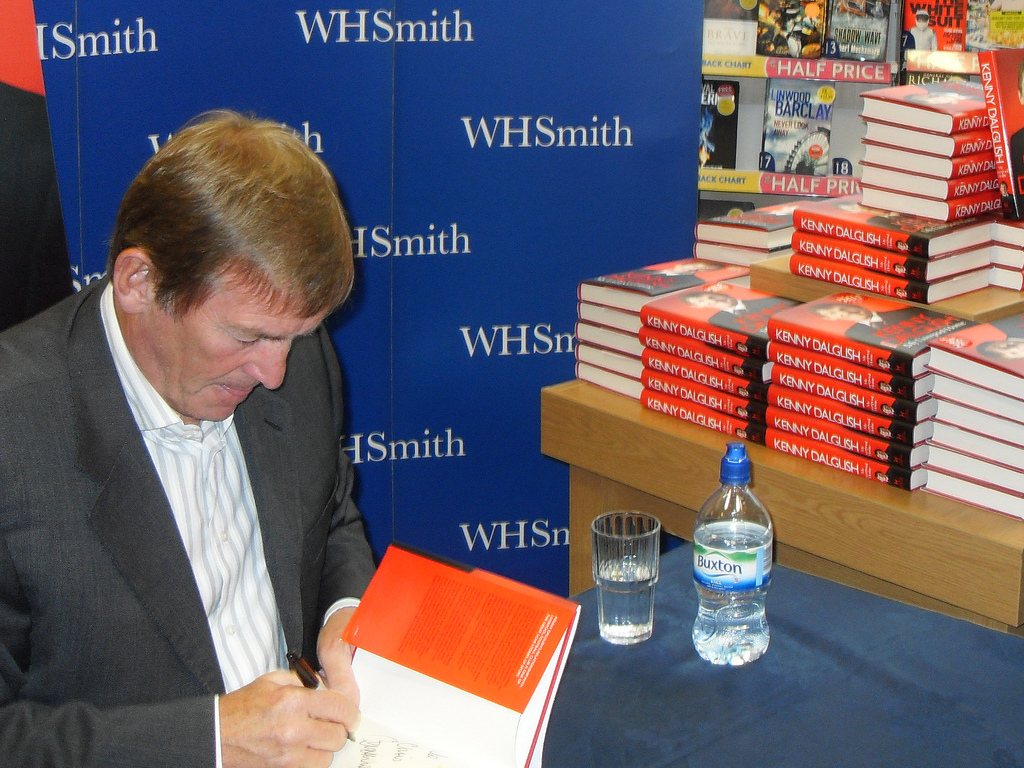
Dalglish in 2010

Dalglish has been married to Marina since 26 November 1974. The couple have four children, including Kelly and Paul. Kelly has worked as a football presenter for BBC Sport and Sky Sports. Paul followed in his father's footsteps as a footballer. Marina was diagnosed with breast cancer in March 2003, but was treated at Aintree University Hospital in Liverpool and recovered. She later launched a charity to fund new cancer treatment equipment for UK hospitals. Dalglish advised author Jilly Cooper on her 2023 novel Tackle!

=== Health ===
On 2 June 2026, Dalglish announced that he had been undergoing treatment for cancer.

== Recognition ==
Dalglish was appointed a Member of the Order of the British Empire (MBE) in the 1985 New Year Honours for services to football. He was knighted in the 2018 Birthday Honours for services to football, charity and the City of Liverpool. He dedicated his knighthood to former Celtic and Liverpool coaches Jock Stein, Bill Shankly and Bob Paisley stating that he was "Humbled" and "A wee bit embarrassed".

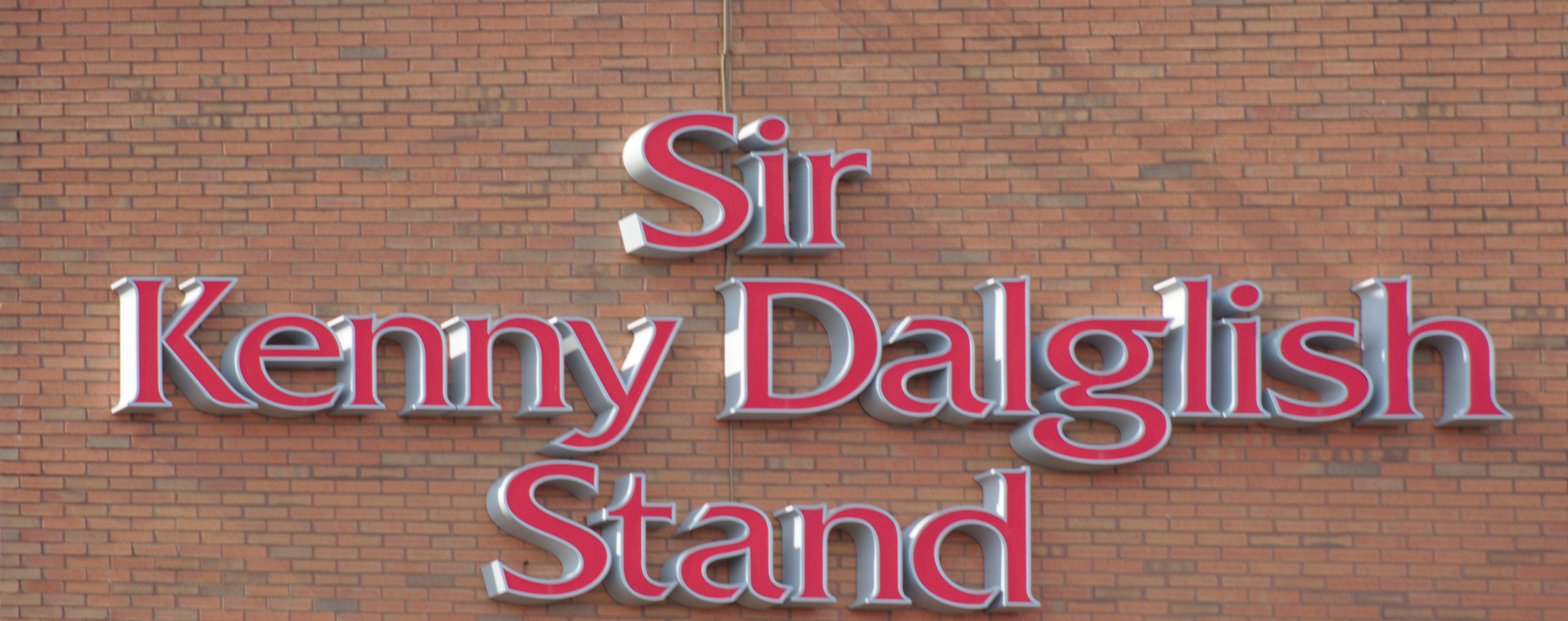
Sign on the exterior of the Sir Kenny Dalglish Stand at Anfield

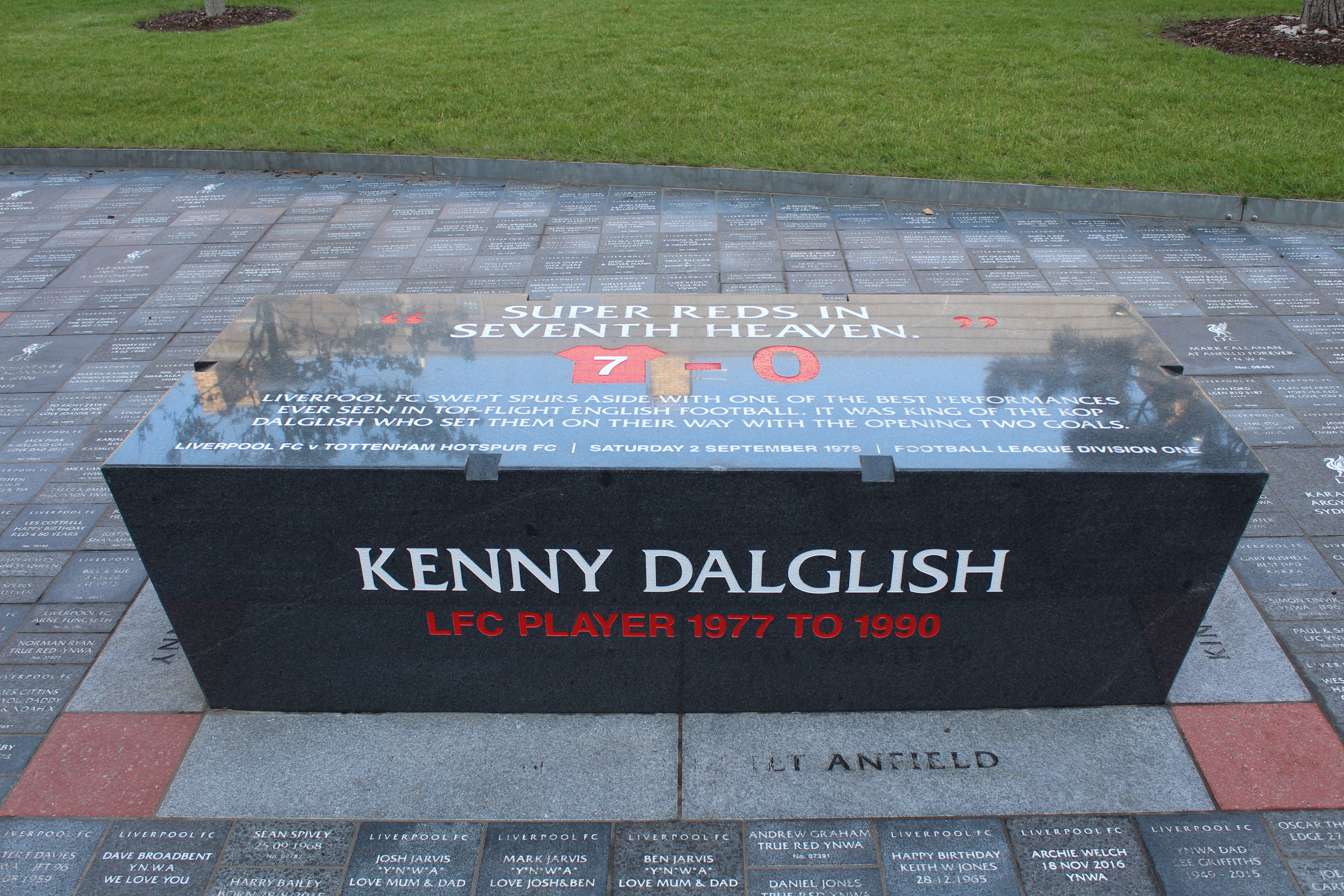
Dalglish's plinth outside Anfield as one of the 'Men who built Anfield'

In 2002, Celtic supporters voted for what they considered to be the greatest Celtic XI of all time. Dalglish was voted into the team, which was; Simpson, McGrain, Gemmell, Murdoch, McNeill, Auld, Johnstone, P. McStay, Dalglish, Larsson and Lennox. He was an inaugural inductee to the English Football Hall of Fame the same year, and later also an inaugural inductee to the Scottish Football Hall of Fame in 2004. He is highly regarded by Liverpool fans, who still affectionately refer to him as "King Kenny", as do supporters of the Scotland National team from the 70s and 80s when he was a world-class player. In 2006 Liverpool fans voted him top of the fans' poll "100 Players Who Shook the Kop". In 2009, FourFourTwo magazine named Dalglish the greatest striker in post-war British football.

On 13 October 2017, Anfield's Centenary Stand was officially renamed the Sir Kenny Dalglish Stand in recognition of his unique contribution to Liverpool. His plinth was also unveiled outside Anfield as one of the 'Men who built Anfield', with Dalglish honoured alongside 1920s championship winning goalkeeper Elisha Scott, 1947 title winner Billy Liddell who was also the club's highest scorer throughout much of the 1950s, managers Shankly and Paisley, Dalglish's 1987 signing John Barnes, and the club's longest-serving captain Steven Gerrard. On 19 December 2023, Dalglish won the BBC Sports Personality of the Year Lifetime Achievement Award.

In August 2026, Dalglish was announced as the recipient of that year's PFA Merit Award from the Professional Footballers Association.

== Charitable work ==
In 2005, Dalglish and his wife founded the charity the Marina Dalglish Appeal to raise money to help treat cancer. Dalglish has participated in a number of events to raise money for the charity, including a replay of the 1986 FA Cup Final. In June 2007 a Centre for Oncology at Aintree University Hospital was opened, after the charity had raised £1.5 million. In 2012, the foundation made a £2 million donation to The Walton Centre which allowed the purchase of a new MRI scanner.

Dalglish often competes in the annual Gary Player Invitational Tournament, a charity golfing event which raises money for children's causes around the world.

On 1 July 2011, Dalglish was awarded an honorary degree by the University of Ulster, for services to football and charity.

== Career statistics ==
=== Club ===
Appearances and goals by club, season and competition
Club	Season	League			National cup (Note: Includes Scottish Cup, FA Cup)		League cup (Note: Includes Scottish League Cup, Football League Cup)		Europe		Other		Total	
Club	Season	Division	Apps	Goals	Apps	Goals	Apps	Goals	Apps	Goals	Apps	Goals	Apps	Goals
Celtic	1968–69	Scottish Division One	0	0	0	0	1	0	0	0	–		1	0
Celtic	1969–70	Scottish Division One	2	0	0	0	2	0	0	0	–		4	0
Celtic	1970–71	Scottish Division One	3	0	1	0	0	0	1 (Note: Appearance(s) in European Cup)	0	2 (Note: Appearances in Glasgow Cup)	0	7	0
Celtic	1971–72	Scottish Division One	31	17	4	1	8	5	7	0	3 (Note: Appearances in Drybrough Cup)	6	53	29
Celtic	1972–73	Scottish Division One	32	21	6	5	11	10	4	3	3	0	56	39
Celtic	1973–74	Scottish Division One	33	18	6	1	10	3	7	2	3	1	59	25
Celtic	1974–75	Scottish Division One	33	16	5	2	8	3	2	0	3 (Note: One appearance in Drybrough Cup, two appearances in Glasgow Cup)	0	51	21
Celtic	1975–76	Scottish Premier Division	35	24	1	1	10	4	5 (Note: Appearances in European Cup Winners' Cup)	3	2	0	53	32
Celtic	1976–77	Scottish Premier Division	35	15	7	1	10	10	2 (Note: Appearances in UEFA Cup)	1	–		54	27
Celtic	Total		204	111	30	11	60	35	28	9	16	7	338	173
Liverpool	1977–78	First Division	42	20	1	1	9	6	9	4	1 (Note: Appearance in FA Charity Shield)	0	62	31
Liverpool	1978–79	First Division	42	21	7	4	1	0	4	0	–		54	25
Liverpool	1979–80	First Division	42	16	8	2	7	4	2	0	1	1	60	23
Liverpool	1980–81	First Division	34	8	2	2	8	7	9	1	1	0	54	18
Liverpool	1981–82	First Division	42	13	3	2	10	5	6	2	1 (Note: Appearance in Intercontinental Cup)	0	62	22
Liverpool	1982–83	First Division	42	18	3	1	7	0	5	1	1	0	58	20
Liverpool	1983–84	First Division	33	7	0	0	8	2	9	3	1	0	51	12
Liverpool	1984–85	First Division	36	6	7	0	1	0	7	0	2 (Note: One appearance in FA Charity Shield, one appearance in Intercontinental Cup)	0	53	6
Liverpool	1985–86	First Division	21	3	6	1	2	1	–		2 (Note: Appearances in Football League Super Cup)	2	31	7
Liverpool	1986–87	First Division	18	6	0	0	5	2	–		2 (Note: One appearance in FA Charity Shield, one appearance in Football League Super Cup)	0	25	8
Liverpool	1987–88	First Division	2	0	0	0	0	0	–		–		2	0
Liverpool	1988–89	First Division	0	0	0	0	1	0	–		1 (Note: Appearance in Football League Centenary Trophy)	0	2	0
Liverpool	1989–90	First Division	1	0	0	0	0	0	–		–		1	0
Liverpool	Total		355	118	37	13	59	27	51	11	13	3	515	172
Career total			559	229	67	24	119	62	79	20	29	10	853	345

=== International ===
Appearances and goals by national team and year
National team	Year	Apps	Goals
Scotland	1971	2	0
Scotland	1972	2	1
Scotland	1973	9	1
Scotland	1974	11	4
Scotland	1975	10	2
Scotland	1976	6	3
Scotland	1977	10	7
Scotland	1978	10	3
Scotland	1979	9	1
Scotland	1980	8	1
Scotland	1981	4	1
Scotland	1982	8	4
Scotland	1983	4	0
Scotland	1984	3	2
Scotland	1985	3	0
Scotland	1986	3	0
Total		102	30

=== Managerial record ===
Managerial record by team and tenure
Team	From	To	Record					Ref
Team	From	To	P	W	D	L	Win %	Ref
Liverpool	30 May 1985	21 February 1991	307	187	78	42	60.9	
Blackburn Rovers	12 October 1991	25 June 1995	196	103	46	47	52.6	
Newcastle United	14 January 1997	27 August 1998	78	30	22	26	38.5	
Celtic	10 February 2000	1 June 2000	18	10	4	4	55.6	
Liverpool	8 January 2011	16 May 2012	74	35	17	22	47.3	
Total			673	365	167	141	54.2	—

== Honours ==
=== Player ===
Celtic

- Scottish Division One/Premier Division: 1971–72, 1972–73, 1973–74, 1976–77
- Scottish Cup: 1971–72, 1973–74, 1974–75, 1976–77
- Scottish League Cup: 1974–75
- Drybrough Cup: 1974–75
- Glasgow Cup: 1974–75

Liverpool

- Football League First Division: 1978–79, 1979–80, 1981–82, 1982–83, 1983–84, 1985–86
- FA Cup: 1985–86
- Football League Cup: 1980–81, 1981–82, 1982–83, 1983–84; runner-up: 1977–78, 1986–87
- Football League Super Cup: 1985–86
- FA Charity Shield: 1977 (shared), 1979, 1980, 1982, 1986 (shared)
- European Cup: 1977–78, 1980–81, 1983–84
- European Super Cup: 1977

Scotland

- British Home Championship: 1974, 1976, 1977

Individual

- Scottish Premier Division Top-scorer: 1975–76 (24 goals)
- Ballon d'Or runner-up: 1983
- PFA Team of the Year: 1978–79 First Division, 1979–80 First Division, 1980–81 First Division, 1982–83 First Division, 1983–84 First Division
- PFA Players' Player of the Year: 1982–83
- FWA Footballer of the Year: 1978–79, 1982–83
- Football League 100 Legends
- English Football Hall of Fame (Player): 2002
- Scottish Football Hall of Fame: 2004
- Scottish Sports Hall of Fame: 2002
- Liverpool FC Hall of Fame: 2010
- FIFA 100: 2004
- BBC Goal of the Season: 1982–83
- BBC Sports Personality of the Year Lifetime Achievement Award: 2023
- Bleacher Report's 21st Best Footballer Of All Time: 2011
- Scotland's Greatest International Footballer: 2020
- World Soccer Greatest Players of 20th Century: 22nd

=== Manager ===
Liverpool

- Football League First Division: 1985–86, 1987–88, 1989–90
- FA Cup: 1985–86, 1988–89; runner-up: 1987–88, 2011–12
- Football League Cup: 2011–12; runner-up: 1986–87
- Football League Super Cup: 1985–86
- FA Charity Shield: 1986 (shared), 1988, 1989, 1990 (shared)

Blackburn Rovers

- Premier League: 1994–95
- Football League Second Division play-offs: 1992

Newcastle United

- FA Cup runner-up: 1997–98

Celtic

- Scottish League Cup: 1999–2000

Individual

- FWA Tribute Award: 1987
- Premier League Manager of the Season: 1994–95
- LMA Hall of Fame
- Blackburn Rovers FC Hall of Fame: 2020
- Premier League Manager of the Month: January 1994, November 1994

=== Orders ===
- Member of the Order of the British Empire: 1985
- Knight Bachelor: 2018
- PFA Merit Award: 2026

== In popular culture ==
In 2025, a sports drama documentary film on Dalglish titled Kenny Dalglish directed by Asif Kapadia premiered at the Rome Festival in October. It is narrated by Dalglish himself and draws from archival footage.

== See also ==
- List of men's footballers with 100 or more international caps
- List of English football championship winning managers
- List of Scotland national football team captains
- List of Scottish football families
