= Quality Street Gang (Celtic F.C.) =

Term for the Celtic reserve team of late 1960s

The Quality Street Gang was a term used by the Scottish media to describe the Celtic reserve team of the late 1960s. Several of the group eventually replaced members of the Lisbon Lions team that had won the European Cup in 1967. George Connelly, Kenny Dalglish, Davie Hay, Danny McGrain, Lou Macari and Paul Wilson all went on to win major honours at Celtic and were capped by Scotland.

In August 1968, Celtic Reserves needed to defeat Partick Thistle Reserves by at least seven goals to win their Reserve League Cup section over Rangers Reserves. Celtic won 12–0, with Macari scoring four goals. Later that same year Scotland manager Bobby Brown asked Celtic manager Jock Stein to supply players to provide opposition for a warm-up practice match. Stein sent his young reserve side, and they went on to defeat a full strength Scotland international team (including Colin Stein and Billy Bremner) 5–2. In August 1970, Celtic fielded several of their so-called Quality Street Gang youths in the Glasgow Cup Final against a full strength Rangers side, winning 3–1.

== List of members of the Quality Street Gang ==
- Davie Cattanach
- George Connelly
- Kenny Dalglish
- Vic Davidson
- John Gorman
- Davie Hay
- Lou Macari
- Pat McCluskey
- Danny McGrain
- Brian McLaughlin
- Pat McMahon
- Billy Murdoch
- Jimmy Quinn
- Paul Wilson

Player	League		Scottish Cup		League Cup		Europe		Total	
Player	Apps	Goals	Apps	Goals	Apps	Goals	Apps	Goals	Apps	Goals
Danny McGrain	439	4	60	1	106	3	54	0	659	8
Kenny Dalglish	204	112	30	11	60	35	28	9	322	167
George Connelly	136	5	25	2	63	4	30	3	254	14
David Hay	130	6	30	1	45	5	25	0	230	12
Paul Wilson	129	30	15	4	48	15	20	6	212	55
Pat McCluskey	115	10	14	1	40	1	20	0	189	12
Lou Macari	58	26	8	8	24	14	12	8	102	56
Vic Davidson	39	17	5	2	10	2	1	0	55	21
Jimmy Quinn	27	1	3	0	10	0	1	0	41	1
Brian McLaughlin	7	1	0	0	11	0	1	1	19	2
Davie Cattanach	13	1	3	0	2	0	1	0	19	1
Pat McMahon	3	2	0	0	3	3	0	0	6	5
John Gorman	0	0	0	0	1	0	0	0	1	0

== Book and documentary ==
In 2013 a book The Quality Street Gang, by Paul John Dykes was published and plans announced for a documentary with filming due to commence in June 2014.
