= Neil Mochan =

Scottish footballer

Personal information
- Date of birth: 6 April 1927
- Place of birth: Carron, Scotland
- Date of death: 28 August 1994 (aged 67)
- Place of death: Falkirk, Scotland
- Positions: Outside left; centre forward

Youth career
- Dunipace Thistle

Senior career*
Years	Team	Apps	(Gls)
1944–1951	Morton	82	(57)
1951–1953	Middlesbrough	38	(14)
1953–1960	Celtic	191	(82)
1960–1963	Dundee United	69	(30)
1964–1964	Raith Rovers	18	(4)
Total		398	(187)

International career
1954	Scotland B	1	(0)
1954	Scotland	3	(0)
- * Club domestic league appearances and goals

Neil Mochan (6 April 1927 – 28 August 1994) was a Scottish professional footballer whose twenty-year playing career included periods in both the Scottish and English top divisions.

Born in Carron, Stirlingshire, he attended St Francis RC School in Falkirk and played juvenile football for Dunipace Thistle. He joined Morton in 1944, where he played for seven seasons before a £14,000 transfer to Middlesbrough. He returned to Scotland two years later, joining Celtic for £8,000.

Celtic won the invitational Coronation Cup in Mochan's second game for the club. He had further success the next year as Celtic won the Double in 1953–54. He made his debut for Scotland at that season's end and was selected in the squad for the 1954 FIFA World Cup in Switzerland, but Scotland lost to both Austria and Uruguay and exited the competition in the first round.

Mochan had predominantly played as a centre-forward or outside left during his career but, despite a consistent scoring record, he was not always a first-team regular for Celtic. As a result, he became somewhat of a utility player, filling in at inside-left and even left-back when required. He was selected at outside left in the 1957 Scottish League Cup Final and scored twice as Celtic defeated their Old Firm rivals Rangers by 7–1.

In 1960, Mochan joined newly promoted Dundee United and helped them establish their position in the top division. In 1963 he signed for Raith Rovers, his younger brother's former club. Dennis Mochan had joined Raith from East Fife in 1959 but left for Nottingham Forest the year before Neil joined the club.

Mochan returned to Celtic as a trainer after his retirement from playing in 1964. He served for many years as head trainer under his former team-mate Jock Stein and continued in a coaching capacity well into the 1980s, under Stein's successors Billy McNeill and Davie Hay.

A biography of Mochan, Celtic's Smiler by Paul John Dykes, was published in 2015, along with an accompanying feature-length documentary.
