= Paul John Dykes =

Scottish sportswriter

- Notable work: The Quality Street Gang (2013); Celtic's Smiler (2015)

Paul John Dykes is a Scottish podcaster, author, scriptwriter and documentary producer.

His first book, The Quality Street Gang, focusing on the group of footballers known by that term, was released by Celtic F.C. in 2013. This debut was named in The Scotsman's 'Top 20 Sports Books of the Year' list.

Throughout 2014, Dykes co-wrote the script, and conducted numerous on-screen interviews, for a feature-length documentary adaptation of his Quality Street Gang book. This project (which was nearing completion) was shelved after 12 months due to unforeseen budgetary constraints.

The follow-up to The Quality Street Gang - Celtic's Smiler - was the authorised biography of former Celtic player Neil Mochan. Dykes also worked as the executive producer on the documentary adaptation of his second book, which was released in December 2015.

In 2016, Dykes co-wrote the autobiography of former Celtic captain, Andy Lynch. The book (entitled Hoops, Stars & Stripes) was again named in the 'Top Football Books of the Year' list by The Scotsman.

== Filmography ==
- The Quality Street Gang - Unreleased (2014)
- Celtic's Smiler (2015)

== Bibliography ==
- The Quality Street Gang (2013)
- Celtic's Smiler (2015)
- Hoops, Stars & Stripes (2016)

== External websites ==
- A Celtic State of Mind
