= Jimmy Quinn (footballer, born 1947) =

Scottish footballer

James Quinn (23 November 1947 – 29 April 2002) was a Scottish footballer, who played for Celtic, Clyde and Sheffield Wednesday. At Celtic, he was considered to be a member of the group known as the Quality Street Gang which included future international stars Davie Hay, Kenny Dalglish, Lou Macari and Danny McGrain.

Quinn was the grandson of former Celtic and Scotland player, also named Jimmy Quinn.
