= Andy Lynch (footballer) =

Scottish footballer and coach

Personal information
- Date of birth: 3 March 1951 (age 75)
- Place of birth: Glasgow, Scotland
- Positions: Left-back; left winger

Senior career*
Years	Team	Apps	(Gls)
1968	Renfrew		
1968–1969	Queen's Park		
1969	Kirkintilloch Rob Roy		
1969–1973	Hearts	60	(11)
1973–1980	Celtic	130	(15)
1980	Philadelphia Fury	23	(4)
1981–1982	Montreal Manic	28	(4)
1981–1982	Montreal Manic (indoor)		

Managerial career
- 1983: Montreal Manic
- 2008: Sunshine Coast
- * Club domestic league appearances and goals

Andy Lynch (born 3 March 1951) is a Scottish football player and coach who played as a left winger or left back. He played for Heart of Midlothian and Celtic, and later in the North American Soccer League for Philadelphia Fury and Montreal Manic. He also coached Montreal and, later, Australian club Sunshine Coast.

== Playing career ==
Lynch moved to Queens Park from Renfrew Juniors in his teens, and played for their reserve side before returning briefly to the Junior ranks with Kirkintilloch Rob Roy.

Lynch was quickly identified as being one of the most promising Junior players in Scotland, and soon attracted interest from Blackpool, Coventry City, Dunfermline Athletic and Hearts.

He earned a second chance in senior football when he joined Heart of Midlothian, signing for the Maroons in 1969. In 4 seasons at Tynecastle, Lynch scored 21 goals in just over 100 appearances from the left wing position. He was capped at under-23 level for Scotland under Tommy Docherty.

In February 1973, Jock Stein paid £35,000 to sign Lynch for Celtic and, although Lynch was initially ineffective as a winger at Parkhead due to a chronic pelvic injury, Stein successfully converted him into a left back.

While with Celtic he won three Scottish league titles and the Scottish Cup twice. He scored the only goal, a penalty, in the 1977 Scottish Cup final against Rangers.

The following season, Lynch became club captain at Celtic Park.

After Jock Stein's departure from Celtic Park in 1978, Lynch continued at left-back (and as captain in the absence of Danny McGrain) during Billy McNeill's first season in charge of the club.

The memorable 1978-79 campaign culminated in a League Championship win over ancient rivals Rangers. The title was won in a winner-takes-all encounter, which is simply referred to as 'The 4-2 Game'.

Lynch moved to North America in 1980, where he continued his playing career in the North American Soccer League with the Philadelphia Fury and the Montreal Manic before moving into coaching.

== Coaching career ==
In 1983, he coached the Montreal Manic. He also spent time as the assistant coach to the Canada national team in the same year, and was lined up to be Canada's Head Coach before returning to Scotland.

Lynch went on to run public houses, 'Andy Lynch's Bar', Argyle Street, Finnieston, Glasgow, and the 'Riverside Tavern' in the Gorbals.

He was briefly assistant manager at Albion Rovers in 1993. In 2008, Andy was initially the coach for Sunshine Coast F.C in the new Queensland State League (association football). (George Cowie replaced him after Round 5 of the competition.)

== Personal life ==
His son Simon is also a former professional footballer.

in 2010, Lynch headed a Middle East consortium's unsuccessful £400 million bid to purchase Liverpool Football Club.

In 2016, his autobiography, 'Hoops, Stars & Stripes' was co-written by Paul John Dykes, and released by CQN Books.

== Sources ==
- Reid, Harry (2005). The Final Whistle (Paperback). Birlinn. ISBN 1-84158-362-6.
- Hoggan, Andrew (1995). Hearts in Art (Hardback). Mainstream. ISBN 1-85158-736-5.
