= George Connelly =

Scottish footballer

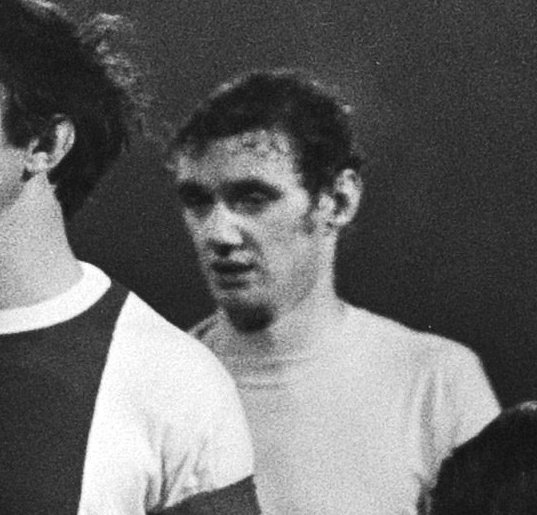
- Connelly in 1971

Personal information
- Date of birth: 1 March 1949 (age 77)
- Place of birth: Fife, Scotland
- Positions: Defender; midfielder

Senior career*
| Years | Team | Apps | (Gls) |
| 1968–1976 | Celtic | 136 | (5) |
| 1976–1977 | Falkirk | 8 | (2) |
| Total | | 144 | (7) |

International career
| 1970–1973 | Scottish Football League XI | 4 | (1) |
| 1973 | Scotland | 2 | (0) |
- * Club domestic league appearances and goals

George Connelly (born 1 March 1949) is a Scottish former international footballer who played professionally with Celtic and Falkirk. Connelly is from Valleyfield in Fife.

== Career ==
Born in Fife, Connelly was a technically accomplished footballer, who could play with distinction anywhere in midfield or defence. He signed for Celtic from Tulliallan Juniors in March 1966 and as a teenager was noted for his fine ball control. This was first publicly displayed when he was sent out to entertain the crowd at Celtic Park before a European tie later that year against Dynamo Kiev. He was considered by many to have the potential to be a world class player – as influential in British football as Beckenbauer was in the German game.

The group of young players who emerged at Celtic at the same time as Connelly were known as the Quality Street Gang, and included Kenny Dalglish, Davie Hay, Lou Macari, Danny McGrain and Jimmy Quinn. Connelly broke into the first team in 1968,

He is remembered particularly for two goals. Just before half time in the 1969 Scottish Cup final against Rangers, he coolly dispossessed John Greig on the edge of the box, evaded the Rangers' skipper's recovery attempt, rounded the goalkeeper before slipping the ball into the empty net. This goal made it 3–0 to Celtic and ended any hopes of a Rangers revival. In 1970, in a European Cup tie against the English champions Leeds United dubbed the football "Battle of Britain" by the media, Connelly scored for Celtic in the first minute of the first leg at Elland Road. Celtic won that match 1–0 and 2–1 in the return leg at Hampden Park to progress to their second European Cup final, which they lost 2–1 to Feyenoord.

== Retirement ==
Connelly was earmarked as the natural successor to Billy McNeill at the heart of the Celtic defence and most likely as captain too. However, a series of personal problems that have never been fully publicised led to him periodically disappearing from Celtic Park. After the fifth such walk-out in 1975 he didn't return.

In a recent interview he stated that his poor salary at Celtic was the main reason for his eventual departure. In a recent book he also pointed at how unhappy he was with his marriage at the time as another factor. Tommy Docherty approached him to sign for Manchester United, but he rejected the move as football just was not in his head at the time. When David Hay left Celtic in 1974, Connelly did not feel as comfortable at the club.

In nine years with Celtic Connelly made 254 first team appearances, scored 13 goals and won two Scotland caps, in 1974. He played for Falkirk for three months in 1976 then reverted to Junior status with Sauchie. During this time he worked as a taxi driver.

He returned to Celtic Park for the first time since his walk out to do the half-time draw during the AC Milan fixture in 2006 in the UEFA Champions League second round.

In 2007, Celtic's Lost Legend was published by Black & White Publishing. Co-written by Connelly and Bryan Cooney, the book was a first hand account of Connelly's life and career. Celtic's Lost Legend was re-published in 2019.
