= 1974–75 Scottish League Cup =

Tournament details
- Country: Scotland

Final positions
- Champions: Celtic
- Runners-up: Hibernian

The 1974–75 Scottish League Cup was the twenty-ninth season of Scotland's second football knockout competition. The competition was won by Celtic, who defeated Hibernian in the Final.

== First round ==
=== Group 1 ===
Team	Pld	W	D	L	GF	GA	GD	Pts
Partick Thistle	6	3	1	2	13	8	+5	7
Dumbarton	6	2	2	2	11	11	0	6
Clyde	6	2	2	2	9	11	−2	6
Arbroath	6	2	1	3	8	11	−3	5

Home team	Score	Away team	Date
Arbroath	0–2	Partick Thistle	10 August 1974
Dumbarton	2–3	Clyde	10 August 1974
Arbroath	3–3	Dumbarton	14 August 1974
Clyde	2–2	Partick Thistle	14 August 1974
Arbroath	2–0	Clyde	17 August 1974
Partick Thistle	1–2	Dumbarton	17 August 1974
Dumbarton	0–2	Arbroath	21 August 1974
Partick Thistle	3–1	Clyde	21 August 1974
Clyde	2–1	Arbroath	24 August 1974
Dumbarton	3–1	Partick Thistle	24 August 1974
Clyde	1–1	Dumbarton	28 August 1974
Partick Thistle	4–0	Arbroath	28 August 1974

=== Group 2 ===
Team	Pld	W	D	L	GF	GA	GD	Pts
Hibernian	6	5	0	1	16	6	+10	10
Rangers	6	4	0	2	16	9	+7	8
Dundee	6	2	0	4	11	14	−3	4
St Johnstone	6	1	0	5	9	23	−14	2

Home team	Score	Away team	Date
Rangers	3–2	St Johnstone	7 August 1974
Hibernian	3–1	Rangers	10 August 1974
St Johnstone	2–1	Dundee	10 August 1974
Dundee	2–1	Hibernian	14 August 1974
St Johnstone	3–6	Rangers	14 August 1974
Dundee	0–2	Rangers	17 August 1974
Hibernian	4–0	St Johnstone	17 August 1974
Hibernian	4–2	Dundee	21 August 1974
Rangers	4–0	Dundee	24 August 1974
St Johnstone	1–3	Hibernian	24 August 1974
Dundee	6–1	St Johnstone	28 August 1974
Rangers	0–1	Hibernian	28 August 1974

=== Group 3 ===
Team	Pld	W	D	L	GF	GA	GD	Pts
Heart of Midlothian	6	4	0	2	13	6	+7	8
Dunfermline Athletic	6	2	3	1	8	9	−1	7
Aberdeen	6	2	1	3	10	7	+3	5
Morton	6	1	2	3	5	14	−9	4

Home team	Score	Away team	Date
Aberdeen	0–1	Heart of Midlothian	10 August 1974
Dunfermline Athletic	1–1	Morton	10 August 1974
Heart of Midlothian	2–3	Dunfermline Athletic	14 August 1974
Morton	3–1	Aberdeen	14 August 1974
Dunfermline Athletic	1–1	Aberdeen	17 August 1974
Morton	0–5	Heart of Midlothian	17 August 1974
Aberdeen	4–0	Morton	21 August 1974
Dunfermline Athletic	2–1	Heart of Midlothian	21 August 1974
Aberdeen	3–0	Dunfermline Athletic	24 August 1974
Heart of Midlothian	2–0	Morton	24 August 1974
Heart of Midlothian	2–1	Aberdeen	28 August 1974
Morton	1–1	Dunfermline Athletic	28 August 1974

=== Group 4 ===
Team	Pld	W	D	L	GF	GA	GD	Pts
Celtic	6	4	1	1	13	8	+5	9
Motherwell	6	2	2	2	11	5	+6	6
Dundee United	6	2	2	2	6	5	+1	6
Ayr United	6	1	1	4	8	20	−12	3

Home team	Score	Away team	Date
Celtic	2–1	Motherwell	10 August 1974
Dundee United	3–1	Ayr United	10 August 1974
Ayr United	3–2	Celtic	14 August 1974
Motherwell	0–0	Dundee United	14 August 1974
Ayr United	0–3	Motherwell	17 August 1974
Celtic	1–0	Dundee United	17 August 1974
Celtic	5–2	Ayr United	21 August 1974
Dundee United	1–0	Motherwell	21 August 1974
Dundee United	0–1	Celtic	24 August 1974
Motherwell	5–0	Ayr United	24 August 1974
Ayr United	2–2	Dundee United	28 August 1974
Motherwell	2–2	Celtic	28 August 1974

=== Group 5 ===
Team	Pld	W	D	L	GF	GA	GD	Pts
Hamilton Academical	6	5	0	1	12	3	+9	10
Queen of the South	6	2	2	2	5	5	0	6
Raith Rovers	6	2	1	3	4	7	−3	5
Berwick Rangers	6	1	1	4	2	8	−6	3

Home team	Score	Away team	Date
Hamilton Academical	4–0	Berwick Rangers	10 August 1974
Raith Rovers	1–1	Queen of the South	10 August 1974
Berwick Rangers	2–0	Raith Rovers	14 August 1974
Queen of the South	0–2	Hamilton Academical	14 August 1974
Berwick Rangers	0–0	Queen of the South	17 August 1974
Hamilton Academical	1–0	Raith Rovers	17 August 1974
Hamilton Academical	2–1	Queen of the South	21 August 1974
Raith Rovers	1–0	Berwick Rangers	21 August 1974
Queen of the South	1–0	Berwick Rangers	24 August 1974
Raith Rovers	2–1	Hamilton Academical	24 August 1974
Berwick Rangers	0–2	Hamilton Academical	28 August 1974
Queen of the South	2–0	Raith Rovers	28 August 1974

=== Group 6 ===
Team	Pld	W	D	L	GF	GA	GD	Pts
Kilmarnock	6	5	1	0	18	1	+17	11
Montrose	6	3	2	1	10	7	+3	8
Queen's Park	6	0	3	3	2	11	−9	3
Stranraer	6	0	2	4	2	13	−11	2

Home team	Score	Away team	Date
Kilmarnock	2–0	Montrose	10 August 1974
Queen's Park	0–0	Stranraer	10 August 1974
Montrose	0–0	Queen's Park	14 August 1974
Stranraer	0–5	Kilmarnock	14 August 1974
Queen's Park	0–2	Kilmarnock	17 August 1974
Stranraer	2–4	Montrose	17 August 1974
Kilmarnock	2–0	Stranraer	21 August 1974
Queen's Park	2–3	Montrose	21 August 1974
Kilmarnock	6–0	Queen's Park	24 August 1974
Montrose	2–0	Stranraer	24 August 1974
Montrose	1–1	Kilmarnock	28 August 1974
Stranraer	0–0	Queen's Park	28 August 1974

=== Group 7 ===
Team	Pld	W	D	L	GF	GA	GD	Pts
Airdrieonians	6	4	0	2	16	6	+10	8
St Mirren	6	4	0	2	9	10	−1	8
Stirling Albion	6	2	0	4	12	16	−4	4
Clydebank	6	2	0	4	8	13	−5	4

Home team	Score	Away team	Date
Airdrieonians	4–0	Clydebank	10 August 1974
St Mirren	3–2	Stirling Albion	10 August 1974
Clydebank	2–0	St Mirren	14 August 1974
Stirling Albion	2–1	Airdrieonians	14 August 1974
Airdrieonians	0–1	St Mirren	17 August 1974
Clydebank	3–1	Stirling Albion	17 August 1974
Airdrieonians	3–2	Stirling Albion	21 August 1974
St Mirren	1–0	Clydebank	21 August 1974
St Mirren	0–6	Airdrieonians	24 August 1974
Stirling Albion	5–2	Clydebank	24 August 1974
Clydebank	1–2	Airdrieonians	28 August 1974
Stirling Albion	0–4	St Mirren	28 August 1974

=== Group 8 ===
Team	Pld	W	D	L	GF	GA	GD	Pts
Falkirk	6	6	0	0	16	2	+14	12
East Fife	6	3	0	3	10	10	0	6
Cowdenbeath	6	1	1	4	4	10	−6	3
Alloa	6	1	1	4	3	11	−8	3

Home team	Score	Away team	Date
Alloa	1–2	East Fife	10 August 1974
Falkirk	4–0	Cowdenbeath	10 August 1974
Cowdenbeath	0–0	Alloa	14 August 1974
East Fife	1–4	Falkirk	14 August 1974
Alloa	0–1	Falkirk	17 August 1974
East Fife	2–1	Cowdenbeath	17 August 1974
Alloa	1–0	Cowdenbeath	21 August 1974
Falkirk	1–0	East Fife	21 August 1974
Cowdenbeath	2–0	East Fife	24 August 1974
Falkirk	3–0	Alloa	24 August 1974
Cowdenbeath	1–3	Falkirk	28 August 1974
East Fife	5–1	Alloa	28 August 1974

=== Group 9 ===
Team	Pld	W	D	L	GF	GA	GD	Pts
Albion Rovers	5	5	0	0	19	4	+15	10
East Stirlingshire	5	3	1	1	12	8	+4	7
Stenhousemuir	5	2	1	2	8	10	−2	5
Brechin City	5	1	2	2	10	13	−3	4
Forfar	5	1	2	2	7	13	−6	4
Meadowbank	5	0	0	5	4	12	−8	0

Home team	Score	Away team	Date
Meadowbank	0–1	Albion Rovers	9 August 1974
Brechin City	2–2	Stenhousemuir	10 August 1974
Forfar	3–3	East Stirlingshire	10 August 1974
Albion Rovers	6–1	Brechin City	14 August 1974
East Stirlingshire	3–1	Meadowbank	14 August 1974
Stenhousemuir	3–0	Forfar	14 August 1974
Brechin City	1–1	Forfar	17 August 1974
East Stirlingshire	1–2	Albion Rovers	17 August 1974
Stenhousemuir	2–1	Meadowbank	17 August 1974
Forfar	1–5	Albion Rovers	21 August 1974
Albion Rovers	5–1	Stenhousemuir	24 August 1974
East Stirlingshire	3–2	Brechin City	24 August 1974
Forfar	2–1	Meadowbank	24 August 1974
Meadowbank	1–4	Brechin City	28 August 1974
Stenhousemuir	0–2	East Stirlingshire	28 August 1974

== Supplementary round ==
=== First leg ===
Home team	Score	Away team	Date	Agg
Albion Rovers	1–2	Falkirk	2 September 1974	

=== Second leg ===
Home team	Score	Away team	Date	Agg
Falkirk	6–1	Albion Rovers	4 September 1974	8–2

== Quarter-finals ==
=== First leg ===
Home team	Score	Away team	Date
Celtic	2–0	Hamilton Academical	11 September 1974
Heart of Midlothian	0–0	Falkirk	11 September 1974
Kilmarnock	3–3	Hibernian	11 September 1974
Partick Thistle	2–5	Airdrieonians	11 September 1974

=== Second leg ===
Home team	Score	Away team	Date	Agg
Airdrieonians	1–1	Partick Thistle	25 September 1974	6–3
Falkirk	1–0	Heart of Midlothian	25 September 1974	1–0
Hamilton Academical	2–4	Celtic	25 September 1974	2–6
Hibernian	4–1	Kilmarnock	25 September 1974	7–4

== Semi-finals ==
=== Ties ===
Home team	Score	Away team	Date
Celtic	1–0	Airdrieonians	9 October 1974
Hibernian	1–0	Falkirk	9 October 1974

== Final ==
26 October 1974

Hibernian	3–6	Celtic
Harper		Deans; Johnstone; Murray; Wilson

Hampden Park, Glasgow
Attendance: 53,848
