= Davie Cattanach =

Scottish footballer (1946–2022)

David Cattanach
Personal information
- Date of birth: 27 June 1946
- Place of birth: Falkirk, Scotland
- Date of death: 4 February 2022 (aged 75)
- Position: Wing half

Senior career*
| Years | Team | Apps | (Gls) |
| 1962–1963 | Stirling Albion | 12 | (0) |
| 1965–1971 | Celtic | 13 | (1) |
| 1971–1974 | Falkirk | 33 | (2) |
| Total | | 58 | (3) |
- * Club domestic league appearances and goals

David Cattanach (27 June 1946 – 4 February 2022) was a Scottish footballer who played for Stirling Albion, Celtic and Falkirk in the Scottish Football League. He died on 4 February 2022, at the age of 75.
