= 1971–72 Scottish Division One =

66th season of top-tier football league in Scotland

Scottish Division One
- Season: 1971–72
- Champions: Celtic
- Relegated: Clyde; Dunfermline

The 1971–72 Scottish Division One was won by Celtic by ten points over nearest rival Aberdeen. Clyde and Dunfermline finished 17th and 18th respectively and were relegated to the 1972–73 Second Division.

== League table ==
Pos	Team	Pld	W	D	L	GF	GA	GD	Pts	Qualification or relegation
1	Celtic	34	28	4	2	96	28	+68	60	Champion
2	Aberdeen	34	21	8	5	80	26	+54	50	
3	Rangers	34	21	2	11	71	38	+33	44	
4	Hibernian	34	19	6	9	62	34	+28	44	
5	Dundee	34	14	13	7	59	38	+21	41	
6	Heart of Midlothian	34	13	13	8	53	49	+4	39	
7	Partick Thistle	34	12	10	12	53	54	−1	34	
8	St Johnstone	34	12	8	14	52	58	−6	32	
9	Dundee United	34	12	7	15	55	70	−15	31	
10	Motherwell	34	11	7	16	49	69	−20	29	
11	Kilmarnock	34	11	6	17	49	64	−15	28	
12	Ayr United	34	9	10	15	40	58	−18	28	
13	Morton	34	10	7	17	46	52	−6	27	
14	Falkirk	34	10	7	17	44	60	−16	27	
15	Airdrieonians	34	7	12	15	44	76	−32	26	
16	East Fife	34	5	15	14	34	61	−27	25	
17	Clyde	34	7	10	17	33	66	−33	24	Relegated to 1972–73 Second Division
18	Dunfermline Athletic	34	7	9	18	31	50	−19	23	Relegated to 1972–73 Second Division

Source: Soccerbase and League Tables

== Results ==
Home \ Away	ABE	AIR	AYR	CEL	CLY	DND	DNU	DNF	EFI	FAL	HOM	HIB	KIL	MOR	MOT	PAR	RAN	STJ
Aberdeen		5–0	7–0	1–1	4–1	3–0	3–0	2–0	5–0	0–0	2–3	2–1	4–2	1–0	4–1	7–2	0–0	4–2
Airdrieonians	1–2		3–4	0–5	1–1	4–2	1–1	1–0	1–1	2–0	1–1	2–2	0–4	2–4	0–2	1–1	0–3	5–4
Ayr United	1–5	1–1		0–1	0–1	0–0	4–2	1–1	4–0	0–3	1–0	1–2	0–0	1–0	1–1	4–0	1–2	0–0
Celtic	1–1	2–0	2–0		9–1	3–1	3–0	1–0	2–1	2–0	3–2	2–1	5–1	3–1	5–2	3–1	2–1	0–1
Clyde	0–0	0–0	3–0	0–7		1–1	0–3	2–1	0–1	3–1	0–1	2–1	0–3	1–2	2–0	0–2	1–1	1–2
Dundee	1–1	4–1	5–1	1–1	0–0		6–4	1–0	0–0	4–0	0–0	1–2	2–0	0–1	2–0	0–0	2–0	1–3
Dundee United	2–0	5–0	2–2	1–5	3–3	1–1		3–2	2–2	3–5	3–2	1–4	1–2	2–1	2–0	1–0	1–5	3–3
Dunfermline Athletic	1–0	1–0	1–1	1–2	2–2	1–2	0–1		2–2	0–1	1–4	2–1	0–1	2–1	1–1	2–2	0–2	2–1
East Fife	0–1	1–1	2–2	0–3	2–2	2–5	0–1	0–1		2–2	2–2	2–1	2–0	0–6	1–1	1–3	0–1	2–2
Falkirk	0–3	1–2	3–0	0–1	3–1	1–1	1–1	2–1	1–1		2–0	2–3	3–1	2–1	3–0	0–0	0–3	2–4
Heart of Midlothian	1–0	1–1	1–0	4–1	2–0	2–5	3–2	1–1	1–1	1–0		0–2	2–1	6–1	0–0	0–0	2–1	2–1
Hibernian	2–2	1–3	1–0	0–1	1–0	1–0	3–0	2–0	2–1	6–0	0–0		3–2	1–0	1–2	3–0	0–1	7–1
Kilmarnock	0–3	5–2	1–2	1–3	2–1	0–3	2–0	0–0	2–3	2–0	2–2	1–1		4–2	1–0	1–4	1–2	2–0
Morton	0–1	2–2	0–3	1–1	4–0	2–2	1–2	1–0	0–0	3–1	1–1	1–1	1–1		3–2	2–0	1–2	0–1
Motherwell	0–4	0–1	2–2	1–5	4–1	1–3	0–1	4–1	1–1	2–1	5–3	1–1	3–0	3–1		2–1	2–0	2–0
Partick Thistle	2–0	4–2	0–1	1–5	2–2	0–0	3–1	2–0	1–0	1–1	2–2	0–1	2–2	2–0	8–3		3–2	2–1
Rangers	0–2	3–0	4–2	2–3	1–0	2–3	1–0	3–4	3–0	3–1	6–0	1–2	3–1	1–2	4–0	2–1		2–0
St Johnstone	1–1	3–3	2–0	0–3	0–1	0–0	2–0	0–0	0–1	3–2	1–1	0–2	5–1	1–0	5–1	2–1	1–4	

Legend: Blue = home team win; Yellow = draw; Red = away team win.

== Awards ==
Award	Winner	Club
SFWA Footballer of the Year	(Scotland) Dave Smith	Rangers

== See also ==
- Nine in a row
