= Danny McGrain =

Scottish footballer and manager

Danny McGrain MBE
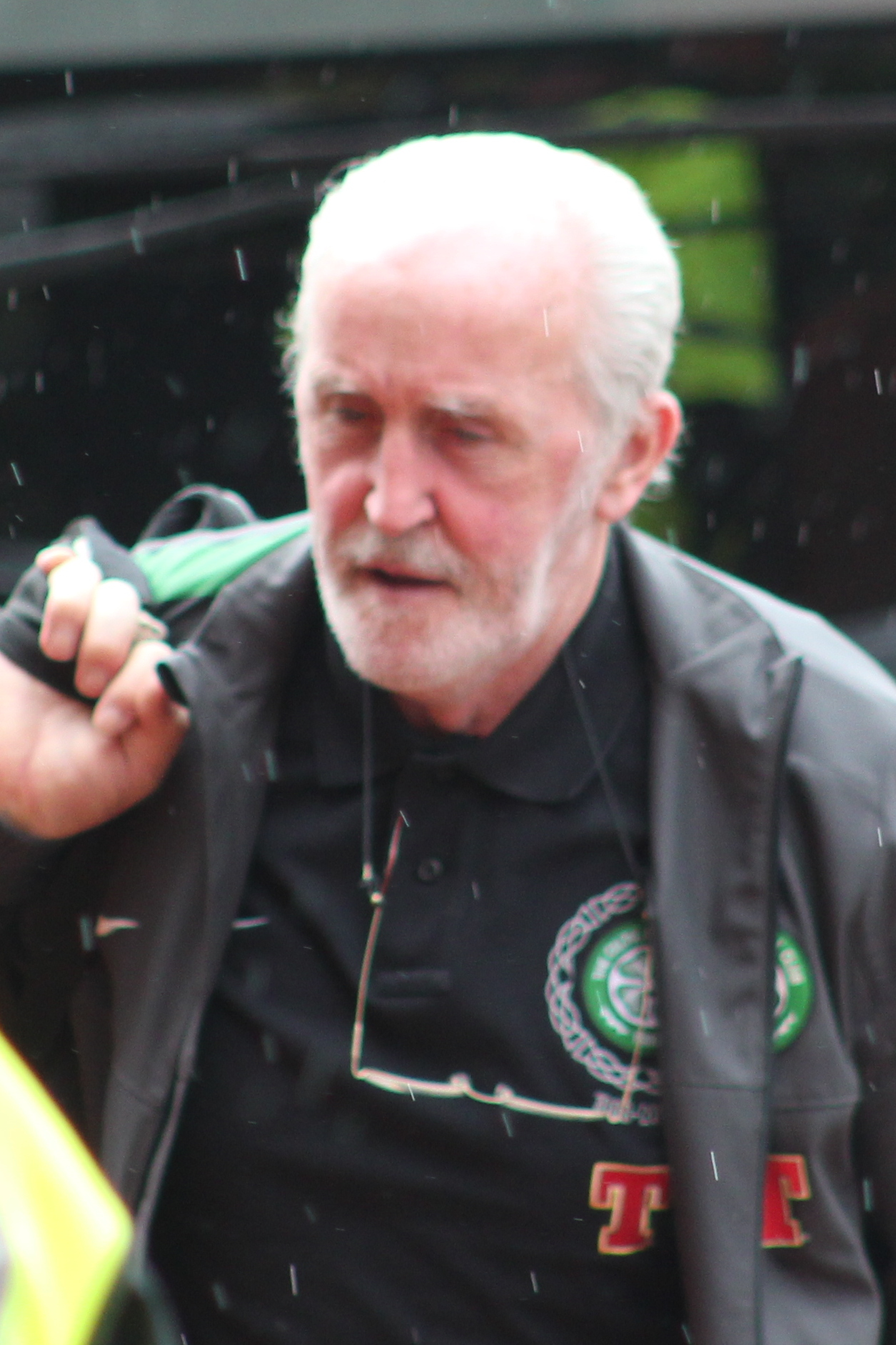
- McGrain in 2013

Personal information
- Full name: Daniel Fergus McGrain
- Date of birth: 1 May 1950 (age 76)
- Place of birth: Finnieston, Glasgow, Scotland
- Height: 5 ft 10 in (1.78 m)
- Position: Right back

Youth career
- Queen's Park Strollers
- 1967–1970: Celtic
- Maryhill

Senior career*
Years	Team	Apps	(Gls)
1970–1987	Celtic	439	(4)
1987–1988	Hamilton Academical	21	(0)
Total		460	(4)

International career
1973	Scottish League XI	1	(0)
1973	Scotland U23	2	(0)
1973–1982	Scotland	62	(0)

Managerial career
- 1992–1994: Arbroath
- * Club domestic league appearances and goals

Daniel Fergus McGrain MBE (born 1 May 1950) is a Scottish former professional footballer, who played for Celtic, Hamilton Academical and the Scotland national team as a right back. McGrain is regarded as one of Scotland's greatest players and throughout the 1970s and 1980s was one of the best full backs in world football; sports writer Hugh McIlvanney commented, "Anybody who saw him at his best had the unmistakable impression of watching a great player, probably one who had no superior anywhere in the world."

McGrain began his career at Celtic and was one of the "Quality Street Gang", a group of young players that emerged in the late 1960s. He progressed to the first team and went on to play 659 competitive games for Celtic between 1970 and 1987, winning seven League Championships, five Scottish Cups and two Scottish League Cups. He spent the final season of his career with Hamilton, where he helped win them promotion to the Premier Division. McGrain played in the 1974 and 1982 World Cups for Scotland. His 62 caps earned him a place in the Scotland national football team roll of honour and he was inducted to the Scottish Football Hall of Fame in 2004.

After retiring from playing, McGrain had a spell as manager of Arbroath in the early 1990s, and is now currently part of the coaching staff at Celtic.

== Club career ==
Born in Glasgow and raised in the city's Drumchapel area, McGrain played for Queen's Park Strollers and also featured for the Scotland Schools team, where he was scouted and signed for Celtic in May 1967, aged 17. He became one of the so-called 'Quality Street Gang', the great Celtic reserve team that also included players such as Kenny Dalglish, Lou Macari, Paul Wilson, Davie Hay and George Connelly, who eventually took the places of the ageing Lisbon Lions. At first, McGrain was regarded as a midfielder but was utilised in a variety of roles in the reserve side before becoming established as a right-back. He had a spell at Junior club Maryhill to gain experience playing with adults, and also made a fruitless attempt at a college course in engineering prior to becoming a full-time professional.

Having been chosen to accompany the main squad to the 1970 European Cup Final along with Dalglish, McGrain made his first-team debut for Celtic as a substitute in a Scottish League Cup tie against Dundee United at Tannadice on 26 August 1970. He then went on and made his league debut three days later in the opening fixture against Morton at Celtic Park. McGrain was used sparingly by manager Jock Stein in his first couple of seasons in the first team, but the young full-back played well in these games.

Having made only 10 league appearances, McGrain suffered the first serious set-back of his career on 25 March 1972. He sustained a fractured skull during a match at Brockville against Falkirk after a clash of heads with forward Doug Somner. McGrain, however, made a full recovery and began the following season, 1972–73, as Celtic's first-choice right-back in place of Jim Craig who had left the club at the end of the previous season. McGrain now became a first-team regular and made 30 league appearances that season. He also rose through the ranks at international level, making two appearances for the Scotland Under 23 side in the spring of 1973, before finally making his debut at full international level for Scotland in May 1973 against Wales at Wrexham. McGrain picked up his first winner's medal at the end of the season when Celtic clinched their eighth successive league championship title.

By the mid-1970s, McGrain was considered by many to be one of the best full-backs in the world. He played as what is known today as an attacking full-back and contributed significantly in both attacking moves as well as in defence. His abilities included a burst of speed, skill and control on the ball, vision and anticipation and, when required, a strong but fair sliding tackle. He won a further league championship title and a Scottish Cup in 1974 and played in the World Cup for Scotland that same year. However, McGrain was diagnosed with diabetes immediately after the World Cup, but with the benefit of medication and a controlled diet and lifestyle, continued to play without adverse effect.

In 1977, McGrain won his second league and cup double. He was also voted Player of the Year by the Scottish Football Writers' Association. McGrain became captain of Celtic at the start of season 1977–78 in the wake of Kenny Dalglish's departure to Liverpool. However, a troublesome foot injury that medical staff struggled to identify or treat adequately saw McGrain miss most of the season with Celtic. He also missed the 1978 World Cup for Scotland. Celtic finished the season trophy-less and failed to qualify for European competition for the first time since the early 1960s. McGrain eventually recovered from his mystery foot injury and after a tentative re-introduction into the Celtic team, now managed by Billy McNeill, played in the club's last 18 league fixtures of the season in the spring of 1979. On his return from injury, a change in his style of play was apparent. There was a noticeable reduction of pace, which in turn was compensated for by a greater reliance on anticipation of play and distribution of the ball. McGrain went on to pick up his fourth league championship medal at the end of that season as Celtic clinched the title with a dramatic 4–2 win over Rangers in their final game of the season.

McGrain continued to be a mainstay of the Celtic side during the early to mid 1980s; captaining them to a further three league championships, two Scottish Cups and one Scottish League Cup, despite also suffering a broken leg in 1981. He made his 600th competitive appearance for Celtic in a 2–0 win over St Mirren in October 1985. Manager Davie Hay described him as a "superb player and professional" and said he was "the best tackler on the field" in the match against St Mirren. In the summer of 1986, Airdrie made an approach for McGrain to become their player-manager. Negotiations reached an advanced stage until a last-minute change of heart by the Airdrie board. McGrain remained at Celtic for a further year; playing regularly at the age of 36: he missed only two games in the second half of the season. He played his final game for Celtic on 9 May 1987, a league fixture away against Hearts.

In May 1987, McGrain was given a free transfer by Celtic. He joined Hamilton Accies in the summer and helped them win promotion to the Premier Division before finally retiring from playing.

== International career ==
His international career began at Scotland Under 23 level on 13 February 1973, with a game against England at Kilmarnock. McGrain played alongside Alan Rough and Asa Hartford in a 1–2 defeat. He won a second cap at Under 23 level a month later away to Wales, winning 2–1.

McGrain made his full international debut for Scotland on 12 May 1973, in a British Home Championship tie against Wales at Wrexham, winning 2–0. He won a further two caps over the following week in Home Championship ties against Northern Ireland and England. The game against England saw McGrain fielded in an unfamiliar role at left-back to accommodate another highly rated right-back, Sandy Jardine of Rangers. McGrain would go on to play at left-back for many of his Scotland appearances in the 1970s in order to accommodate the Rangers player, still able to play to the abilities he displayed in his normal role.

McGrain played in eight consecutive internationals for Scotland and was selected by Willie Ormond for the 22 man squad travelling to West Germany for the 1974 World Cup. McGrain played in all three World Cup group matches (Zaire, Brazil and Yugoslavia), but despite being undefeated Scotland returned home having failed to qualify for the next phase. This early-exit from the tournament proved fortunate for McGrain, who had been suffering from extreme thirst all through the tournament and had lost 2 stone (12 kg) in weight. On his return to Glasgow, McGrain was diagnosed as being diabetic. Had there been any further delay in identification and treatment of his condition, the consequences could have proved fatal. With his illness now being managed, McGrain was able to continue playing football.

McGrain continued to play regularly for Scotland, now being fielded in his more familiar position at right-back, but missed Scotland's ill-fated 1978 World Cup campaign in Argentina through injury.

On his recovery from injury in 1979, McGrain regained his place in the Scotland team. He made 16 consecutive international appearances in the run up to the 1982 World Cup in Spain. Now captain of the side, McGrain was named in Jock Stein's 22 man squad travelling to Spain. He played in Scotland's opening game against New Zealand but was dropped for the next match against Brazil. McGrain came on as a substitute for Gordon Strachan in Scotland's third game, against the Soviet Union. This transpired to be his final game for Scotland.

McGrain is a member of the Scotland national football team roll of honour, courtesy of the 62 caps he won during his career.

== Coaching career ==
After retiring from playing, McGrain had a brief spell coaching at Clydebank in 1989.

In November 1992 McGrain was appointed manager of Scottish Second Division side Arbroath. That season, McGrain led Arbroath to the quarter-finals of the Scottish Cup, losing 0–3 at home to eventual winners Rangers. The following season Arbroath played McGrain's former club Celtic in a Scottish League Cup tie and lost 1–9, a record defeat for the club. McGrain resigned in January 1994 due to illness. In his 14 months at Gayfield Park, McGrain became popular with their fans and was followed by a group of supporters known as 'Danny McGrain's Bearded Army'. These supporters attended games wearing tribute T-shirts and stick-on beards, affectionately mimicking McGrain's own trademark beard.

In August 1997 McGrain joined the backroom staff at Celtic, working under Wim Jansen. After a spell coaching the under-21 side, he was made first team coach after being promoted by Neil Lennon in October 2012 from the Development Squad.

== Personal life ==
McGrain is married to Laraine, and the couple have three daughters. His younger brother Tommy was also a footballer who trained with Celtic as a teenager, but he did not break through to the first team and subsequently played for Dumbarton.

McGrain supported Rangers (Celtic's Glasgow rivals) as a boy. He wrote two autobiographies, one when his career was at its peak and another shortly after he retired. In both, McGrain (a Protestant) told how he had been spotted by someone doing some scouting for Rangers when he was still a boy but the scout did not recommend him to Rangers, wrongly assuming from his name – Daniel Fergus McGrain – that he was a Catholic and that Rangers would not sign him because of this. However, McGrain has since stated, "I don't know if that story's true. Over the years that followed nobody from Rangers ever told me they wanted to sign me".

In the summer of 1974, McGrain was diagnosed as suffering from diabetes. He had just returned home from playing for Scotland in the World Cup in West Germany, where he had displayed an excessive thirst and lost 2 stones (12 kg) in weight. Despite his condition, McGrain was able to continue playing top-level football. In March 2002 McGrain was found by police in the south side of Glasgow, slumped unconscious in the driver's seat of his car. He had entered a hypoglycaemic state, where the brain is drained of sugar and causes the body to shut down to conserve what little there is left. The officers revived McGrain and fed him a sugary sweet. Had McGrain not been found in time he would have suffered brain damage and possibly died. However, he made a full recovery and commented "There was no harm done in the end."

In the 1983 New Year Honours, McGrain was appointed Member of the Order of the British Empire (MBE) for services to association football in Scotland. The investiture was performed by the Queen Mother (the Queen was on tour in America), at Buckingham Palace.

In 2002, Celtic supporters voted for what they considered to be the greatest Celtic XI of all time. McGrain was voted into the team, which was; Simpson, McGrain, Gemmell, Murdoch, McNeill, Auld, Johnstone, P. McStay, Dalglish, Larsson and Lennox. He was an inaugural inductee to the Scottish Football Hall of Fame in 2004,

McGrain is the vice patron of Football Aid, a Scottish charity fund-raising organisation. He has been involved with them since their inception in 2000, and was appointed vice patron in 2004.

In September 2026, McGrain's family announced that he has been diagnosed with Alzheimer's disease.

== In popular culture ==
In 1996, Glasgow rock band Big Wednesday celebrated McGrain in music in their single "Sliding in like McGrain". McGrain appeared on television with the group as part of the promotional activities.

== Career statistics ==
=== Club ===
Appearances and goals by club, season and competition;Club
Club	Season	League			Scottish Cup		Scottish League Cup		Europe		Other (Note: Appearances in Glasgow Cup, Drybrough Cup, Anglo-Scottish Cup)		Total	
Club	Season	Division	Apps	Goals	Apps	Goals	Apps	Goals	Apps	Goals	Apps	Goals	Apps	Goals
Celtic	1970–71	Scottish Division One	7	0	0	0	5	0	2	0	2	0	16	0
Celtic	1971–72	Scottish Division One	3	0	1	0	4	0	2	0	0	0	10	0
Celtic	1972–73	Scottish Division One	30	0	7	0	10	0	4	0	2	0	53	0
Celtic	1973–74	Scottish Division One	30	1	3	0	13	0	5	0	3	0	54	1
Celtic	1974–75	Scottish Division One	30	0	5	0	7	0	2	0	3	1	47	1
Celtic	1975–76	Scottish; Premier Division	35	0	1	0	9	1	6	0	2	0	53	1
Celtic	1976–77	Scottish; Premier Division	36	0	7	0	10	1	2	0	0	0	55	1
Celtic	1977–78	Scottish; Premier Division	7	0	0	0	2	0	2	0	0	0	11	0
Celtic	1978–79	Scottish; Premier Division	18	2	4	0	1	0	0	0	1	0	24	2
Celtic	1979–80	Scottish; Premier Division	34	0	6	0	5	0	6	0	3	0	54	0
Celtic	1980–81	Scottish; Premier Division	33	0	3	0	8	0	4	0	1	0	49	0
Celtic	1981–82	Scottish; Premier Division	26	0	2	1	6	0	1	0	0	0	35	1
Celtic	1982–83	Scottish; Premier Division	33	1	3	0	10	1	4	0	2	0	52	2
Celtic	1983–84	Scottish; Premier Division	33	0	5	0	10	0	6	0	0	0	54	0
Celtic	1984–85	Scottish; Premier Division	30	0	7	0	3	0	4	0	1	0	45	0
Celtic	1985–86	Scottish; Premier Division	28	0	2	0	2	0	2	0	2	0	36	0
Celtic	1986–87	Scottish; Premier Division	26	0	4	0	1	0	2	0	0	0	33	0
Celtic	Total		439	4	60	1	106	3	54	0	22	1	681	9
Hamilton Academical	1987–88	Scottish First Division	21	0	0	0	1	0	0	0	0	0	22	0
Career total			460	4	60	1	107	3	54	0	22	0	703	9

=== International ===
Appearances and goals by national team and year
National team	Year	Apps	Goals
Scotland	1973	8	0
Scotland	1974	7	0
Scotland	1975	9	0
Scotland	1976	7	0
Scotland	1977	9	0
Scotland	1978	0	0
Scotland	1979	1	0
Scotland	1980	8	0
Scotland	1981	7	0
Scotland	1982	6	0
Total		62	0

== Honours ==
=== Player ===
Celtic

- Scottish League Championship (7): 1972–73, 1973–74, 1976–77, 1978–79, 1980–81, 1981–82, 1985–86
- Scottish Cup (5): 1973–74, 1974–75, 1976–77, 1979–80, 1984–85
- Scottish League Cup (2): 1974–75, 1982–83

Hamilton Academical

- Scottish League First Division (second tier): 1987–88

=== Manager ===
Arbroath

- Forfarshire Cup: 1993–94

=== Individual ===
- Scottish Football Writers' Player of the Year: 1976–77
- Scotland national football team roll of honour: 1981
- MBE: 1983 New Year Honours
- Scottish Football Hall of Fame: inducted 2004

== See also ==
- List of Scotland national football team captains
