= David Hay =

Scottish footballer and manager

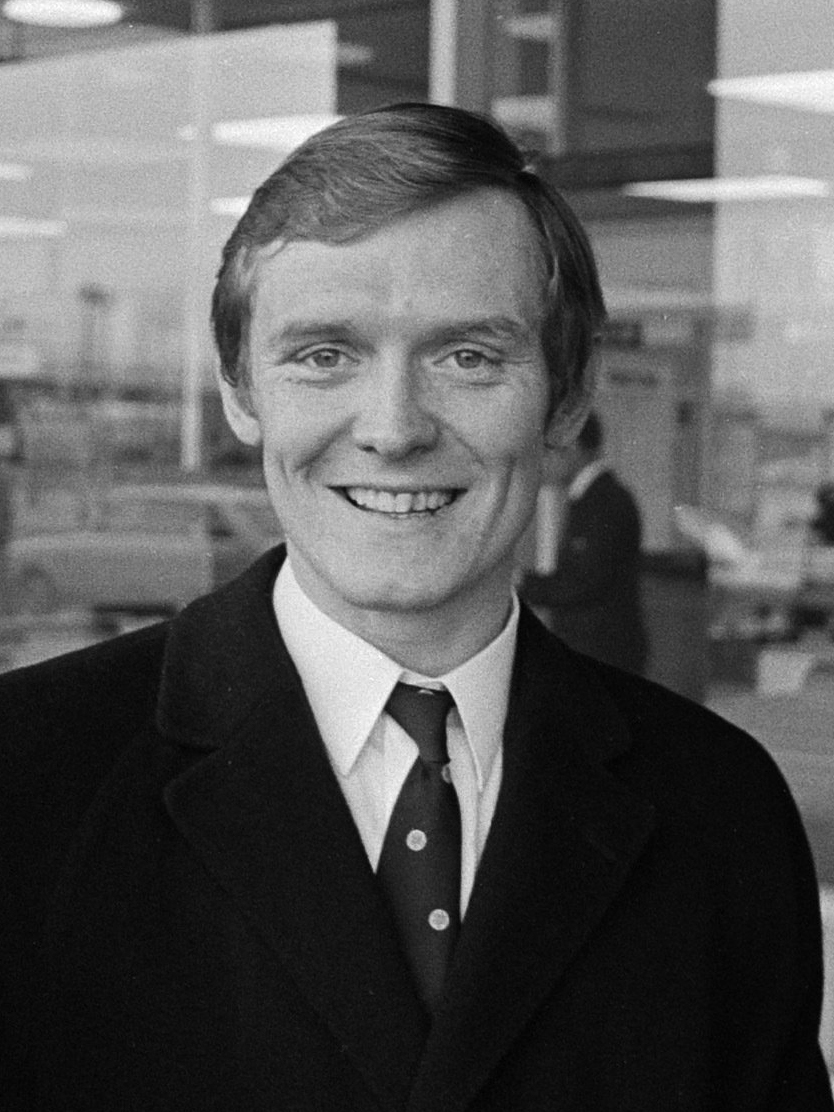
- Hay in 1971

Personal information
- Full name: David Hay
- Date of birth: 29 January 1948 (age 78)
- Place of birth: Paisley, Scotland
- Position: Midfielder

Senior career*
Years	Team	Apps	(Gls)
1968–1974	Celtic	130	(6)
1974–1980	Chelsea	120	(3)
Total		250	(9)

International career
1970–1974	Scotland	27	(0)
1970–1973	Scottish Football League XI	4	(0)

Managerial career
- 1981–1982: Motherwell
- 1983–1987: Celtic
- 1989: Lillestrøm SK
- 1991–1992: St Mirren
- 2000–2003: Livingston (joint manager)
- 2003–2004: Livingston
- 2004–2005: Dunfermline Athletic
- 2009: Livingston (interim manager)
- * Club domestic league appearances and goals

David Hay (born 29 January 1948) is a Scottish former football player and manager. He broke into the Celtic team in the late 1960s, as one of a generation of players who continued a highly successful era for the club. A contract dispute between Hay and Celtic led to him being transferred to Chelsea in 1974. He played in over 100 league games for Chelsea, but was forced to retire in 1979 due to a detached retina. Hay appeared in 27 international matches for Scotland, and was selected for their 1974 FIFA World Cup squad.

After retiring as a player, Hay entered football management with Motherwell in 1981. He led them to a promotion in 1981–82, but left the club at the end of the season. He was then appointed Celtic manager in 1983, and enjoyed some success as they won the 1984–85 Scottish Cup and the Scottish league championship in 1985–86. In the 1990s he returned to Celtic as Chief Scout and later assistant general manager.

Hay also won the Norwegian league championship during a brief stint with Lillestrøm SK. He subsequently worked for St Mirren, Livingston and Dunfermline Athletic.

== Playing career ==
After completing his secondary education at St Mirin's Academy in Paisley, Hay signed for Celtic in 1966. He became one of the "Quality Street Gang" reserve team which eventually took the places of the ageing Lisbon Lions. He made his league debut on 6 March 1968 against Aberdeen going on to make 230 appearances for Celtic scoring 12 goals, winning 5 League Championships, 3 Scottish Cups and 1 League Cup. After playing for Scotland in the 1974 World Cup in West Germany, and following a dispute with Celtic, he was transferred to Chelsea for a club record £225,000. Initially signed as a direct replacement for Alan Hudson in midfield, he adopted a more defensive role in the young Chelsea side that emerged following their relegation a year later. In 1979 a serious knee injury forced him to retire from the game as a player. He had also suffered problems with a detached retina and eventually lost full vision in his right eye. He won a total 27 caps for Scotland.

== Management career ==
=== Motherwell ===
His first venture into football management was when he took over the reins at Motherwell in 1981 following Ally MacLeod. He led Well to the Scottish First Division title and promotion to the Scottish Premier Division. He left at the end of the 1981–82 season.

=== Celtic ===
Hay succeeded Billy McNeill as Celtic manager in 1983, winning the Scottish Cup in 1985 and the Premier Division in dramatic fashion in 1986. Celtic won their final game 5–0 against St Mirren at Love Street but needed Hearts, who were league leaders and favourites to lift the trophy, to lose to Dundee at Dens Park. Albert Kidd secured the victory for Dundee with two goals and Celtic were crowned champions. After Celtic failed to win a trophy in 1986–87, Hay left Celtic. He was asked to resign, but refused, so he was sacked and was replaced by McNeill.

=== Lillestrom SK ===
In 1989, Hay ventured to Norway and led Lillestrom SK to the Norwegian Premier League championship.

=== St Mirren ===
In 1991, Hay took on Paisley club St Mirren but left a year later.

=== Return to Celtic ===
Hay became chief scout at Celtic in 1994, and was responsible for identifying players such as Jorge Cadete, Paolo di Canio and Pierre van Hooijdonk who signed for the club. He became assistant general manager to Jock Brown in 1997, but left in 1998 in acrimonious circumstances.

=== Livingston ===
Hay teamed up with Jim Leishman in 2000 as co-managers of Livingston, and led the club to the Scottish First Division title at the end of 2000–01, and the club's first promotion to the Scottish Premier League. Their debut season in the top flight in 2001-02 earned them their first qualification into Europe with a UEFA Cup place. The 2002–03 season was less impressive and they both stepped down from the management position, although they both stayed at the club. Brazilian Marcio Maximo Barcellos took over.

Hay returned to the manager's job shortly into 2003–04 season, this time in sole charge, taking over from Marcio Maximo after just 9 games of the season. Hay went on to win the Scottish League Cup while the club was in administration, beating heavy favourites Hibernian (who beat Celtic and Rangers en route to the final). Despite this success, the veteran boss was released at the end of the season to be replaced by Allan Preston, one of his first team coaches, by new chairman, Pearse Flynn of the Lionheart Consortium.

=== Dunfermline Athletic ===
Hay was then appointed manager of Dunfermline Athletic, succeeding Jimmy Calderwood. He rejoined with Jim Leishman who was the Fife club's Director of Football. He was sacked near the end of the season with the club struggling in the Scottish Premier League.

== After management ==
Hay rejoined Livingston on 16 June 2008 in an advisory role. He briefly became interim manager in 2009 after Paul Hegarty was suspended by the club.

In 2015 Hay returned to Celtic as a director of the Celtic Pools, which raises money for the youth academy. He has also worked in a business development role for New College Lanarkshire.

== Honours ==
=== Player ===
Celtic

- Scottish League champions (5): 1969–70, 1970–71, 1971–72, 1972–73, 1973–74
- Scottish Cup (2): 1970–71, 1973–74
- Scottish League Cup: 1969–70
- Glasgow Cup: 1969–70
- European Cup runner-up: 1969–70

Chelsea

- Football League Second Division promoted: 1976–77

Scotland

- British Home Championship: 1969–70, 1973–74 (shared)

Individual

- Rothmans Golden Boots Awards: 1970, 1974

=== Manager ===
Motherwell

- Scottish First Division: 1981–82

Celtic

- Scottish League champions: 1985–86
- Scottish Cup: 1984–85

Lillestrøm

- Norwegian League champions: 1989

Livingston

- Scottish First Division: 2000–01
- Scottish League Cup: 2003–04

== Career statistics ==
=== International ===
Scotland national team
Year	Apps	Goals
1970	4	0
1971	7	0
1972	—	
1973	7	0
1974	9	0
Total	27	0

=== Managerial statistics ===
Team	Nat	From	To	Record				
Team	Nat	From	To	G	W	D	L	Win %
Motherwell	(Scotland)	August 1981	May 1982	40	26	9	5	65.00
Celtic	(Scotland)	August 1983	May 1987	209	119	50	40	56.94
Lillestrøm	(Norway)	1989	1989	38	23	8	7	60.53
St Mirren	(Scotland)	March 1991	May 1992	55	7	17	31	12.73
Livingston	(Scotland)	March 2000	July 2003	147	67	32	48	45.58
Livingston	(Scotland)	October 2003	July 2004	39	15	11	13	38.46
Dunfermline Athletic	(Scotland)	June 2004	May 2005	42	8	12	22	19.05

- First spell at Livingston was a co-manager role with Jim Leishman.

== See also ==
- List of Scotland national football team captains
