= Celtic F.C. in international football =

Scottish club in European football

Celtic F.C. in European football
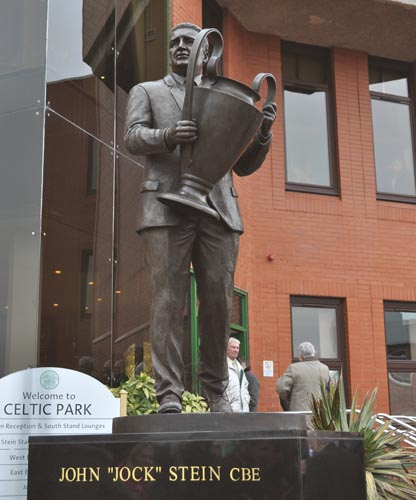
- Jock Stein was the first Scottish football manager to win the European Cup, leading Celtic to victory over Inter Milan in 1967
- Club: Celtic F.C.
- Seasons played: 62
- First entry: 1962–63 Inter-Cities Fairs Cup
- Latest entry: 2026–27 UEFA Europa League

Titles
- Champions League: 1 (Best: Champions: 1967)
- Europa League: 0 (Best: Runners-up)
- Cup Winners' Cup: 0 (Best: Semi-final)
- Conference League: 0 (Best: Knockout Playoff round)

Celtic Football Club is a Scottish football club based in Glasgow, which has regularly taken part in European competitions since its first appearance in the 1962–63 Inter-Cities Fairs Cup. Since then, the club has competed in every UEFA-organized competition, with the exception of the UEFA Super Cup and the defunct Intertoto Cup.

The club became the first British and Scottish team to win the European Cup by defeating Inter Milan in the 1967 final.

Celtic reached a second final and lost 2–1 to Feyenoord.

In more recent years, Celtic reached the 2003 UEFA Cup Final in Seville on 21 May 2003, which they lost 3–2 after extra time to Porto.

Scott Brown, a long-serving captain for Celtic, holds the club record for the most European appearances, playing in 127 matches. Henrik Larsson, who scored twice in the 2003 UEFA Cup Final, is the record goal scorer of the club, with 35 goals.

== Background ==
The first officially sanctioned European club tournament, the European Champion Clubs' Cup, was launched in 1955. Conceived by Gabriel Hanot, the editor of L'Équipe, as a competition for winners of the European national football leagues, it is considered the most prestigious European football competition. Hibernian were amongst the 16 sides invited to take part in the tournament's first season, and they became the first British club to participate in European club competition. Rangers took part in the tournament the following season as champions of Scotland. The Inter-Cities Fairs Cup was also established at the same time, and in 1960 Hibernian became the first Scottish club to participate, eliminating Barcelona on route to the semi-final, where they lost to Roma. The 1960–61 season was also the inaugural year of the European Cup Winners' Cup, with Rangers reaching the final. They were comfortably beaten over two legs by Fiorentina, but were still the first British club to reach a UEFA sanctioned European club final.

== History ==
=== 1960s and 1970s ===
==== First entries into European competition ====
Celtic's third-place finish in the league the previous season saw them qualify for the Inter-Cities Fairs Cup in 1962. Drawn against Spanish side Valencia in the first round, Celtic were defeated 4–2 in the first leg in Spain on 24 October 1962, having trailed 3–0 at half time. Bobby Carroll scored Celtic's two goals in the second half, becoming the club's first-ever European goal scorer. A modicum of pride after the first leg defeat was restored, however, in the return leg in Glasgow, which finished in a 2–2 draw, albeit seeing Celtic lose the tie on aggregate and be eliminated from the competition.

The following season, 1963–64, saw Celtic return to European competition, this time in the European Cup Winners Cup. Celtic belied their mediocre domestic form in Scotland by reaching the semi-final of the tournament, eliminating Basel, Dinamo Zagreb and Slovan Bratislava en route. In Celtic's 5–1 win away against Basel in the first leg of their preliminary round tie on 17 September 1963, John Hughes became the first Scottish player to score a hat-trick in the away leg of a European tie. The first leg of the semi-final against MTK Budapest took place at Celtic Park, and goals from Jimmy Johnstone and Stevie Chalmers gave Celtic an impressive 3–0 win. A combination of tactical naïveté and questionable refereeing saw Celtic slump to a 4–0 defeat in the return leg in Hungary and go out on aggregate.

Season 1964–65 saw Celtic back in the Inter-Cities Fairs cup. First-round opponents were Portuguese side Leixões S.C. The first leg away in Portugal was ill-tempered and marred by eccentric referring decisions in a 1–1 draw. Stevie Chalmers and Ian Young were both controversially sent off; Chalmers for a minor collision with the Leixões goalkeeper as they both jumped for the ball, Young for a minor scuffle with an opponent (who was also sent off). Celtic won the return match in Glasgow 3–0 to progress, although the game was again bad-tempered. In the next round Celtic faced Barcelona. The Spaniards won 3–1 at the Nou Camp and held Celtic to a goalless draw at Parkhead in a series of ties where they clearly outclassed their opponents.

==== Glory years ====
Now with Jock Stein as manager, Celtic enjoyed another successful run in Europe in 1965–66, reaching the semi-finals of the European Cup Winners' Cup by knocking out Go Ahead Deventer, AGF Aarhus and Dynamo Kyiv. They lost 1–2 on aggregate to Liverpool in the semi-final, although a last minute Bobby Lennox goal was controversially disallowed in the second leg at Anfield which would have seen Celtic win the tie via the recently implemented away goals rule.

Celtic's European Cup campaign in 1966–67 was their first-ever participation in Europe's premier club tournament. Zürich and Nantes were comfortably disposed of in the first two rounds (5–0 and 6–2 on aggregate respectively). The quarter-final in March 1967 pitched Celtic against Yugoslav champions Vojvodina. The Yugoslav side won the first leg in Novi Sad 1–0, while the return match in Glasgow proved to be a fraught affair. The Yugoslavs defended resolutely and threatened on the counter-attack, but Celtic levelled the tie on aggregate in the second half with a goal by Stevie Chalmers. Celtic pressed for a winner, but Vojvodina defended well and the tie looked like a play-off in neutral Rotterdam would be required. In the final minute, however, Billy McNeill headed in a Charlie Gallacher cross to see Celtic progress to the semi-final. Celtic now faced Czechoslovak side, Dukla Prague. This time the first leg of the tie took place in Glasgow, with Celtic winning 3–1 courtesy of goals from Jimmy Johnstone and a Willie Wallace brace. In respect of his opponents' quality, Stein set up Celtic to be ultra-defensive for the second leg and forsake – temporarily – their philosophy of attacking football. The tactics worked as Celtic secured a 0–0 draw to put them in the final. Stein, however, was almost apologetic about the manner of Celtic's success in that game and he felt uncomfortable in later years discussing the matter.

The final saw Celtic play Inter Milan, with the match taking place at the Estádio Nacional on the outskirts of Lisbon on 25 May 1967. Celtic fell a goal behind after only seven minutes, Jim Craig adjudged to have fouled Renato Cappellini in the penalty box and Sandro Mazzola converting the resultant penalty. Celtic swept into constant attack after that, but found Inter goalkeeper Giuliano Sarti in outstanding form. With 63 minutes played, after incessant pressure Celtic finally equalized when Tommy Gemmell scored with a powerful 25-yard shot. The balance of play remained constant, with Inter defending deeply against sustained Celtic attacking. With about five minutes remaining, a long-range shot from Bobby Murdoch was diverted by Stevie Chalmers past a wrong-footed Sarti. It proved to be the winning goal and thus Celtic became the first British team, and the first from outside Spain, Portugal or Italy, to win the competition. The cup-winning side have since become known as the Lisbon Lions. Celtic remain the only Scottish club to have reached the final.

As champions of Europe, Celtic competed in the Intercontinental Cup against South American champions Racing Club of Argentina. Both sides won their respective home games and the series went to a deciding game played in Montevideo, Uruguay. The first two matches, however, were marred by the Argentinians' incessant foul play and spitting, and Celtic goalkeeper Ronnie Simpson was struck on the head by an object thrown by Racing Club fans in the second match in Buenos Aires. The third match degenerated into a shambles as the Celtic players lost their composure and discipline. Six players were sent off – four from Celtic and two from Racing Club – with Racing scoring the only goal to win the cup in a match described by Reuters as a "bar room brawl".

The following two seasons in the European Cup were a disappointment for Celtic; going out to Dynamo Kyiv in the first round in their defence of the trophy in the autumn of 1967, then reaching the quarter-finals the following season only to lose their home leg against AC Milan, having achieved a credible no-scoring draw in the first game in Italy. Earlier in the season, Celtic set off a controversy in the wake of the Soviet Union's invasion of Czechoslovakia in August 1968. At chairman Robert Kelly's behest, the club sent UEFA a telegram condemning the military action and expressing concern that any team from Western Europe having to play a tie in an Eastern Bloc country. Celtic's stance received support from several clubs throughout Western Europe, although others such as Leeds United publicly criticized Celtic's intervention. In response, UEFA redid the draw for the first round of the European Cup and European Cup Winners' Cup to avoid pairing Eastern European sides with clubs from the West. This elicited a furious response from clubs and football authorities in the East, the majority of whom withdrew in protest.

Celtic reached the European Cup final again in 1970. Celtic knocked out Basel in the first round, then defeated Portuguese side Benfica 3–0 at Parkhead in the first leg of the second round. Celtic's performance was impressive, and they were unfortunate not to score more. Benfica rallied in the return match and put Celtic under intense pressure from the start. John Fallon was outstanding in goal for Celtic and with the game nearing its end had limited the score to 2–0 for the Portuguese side. Diamantino, however, scored directly from a free-kick in the final minute to level the tie on aggregate and force extra time. No further goals were scored in the additional 30 minutes, and the tie was decided by the toss of a coin. Captain Billy McNeill successfully called, and Celtic progressed to the quarter-finals. Celtic were unhappy that the tie had been decided in this manner, and suggested to UEFA an alternative of using a score line based on the number of corners forced in extra-time. UEFA rejected this proposal, but soon afterwards introduced penalty kick shoot-outs in the European Cup to decide drawn ties after extra-time. Celtic went on to face Italian champions Fiorentina in the quarter-finals, winning 3–1 on aggregate.

The semi-finals saw Celtic drawn against English champions Leeds United. This was the first occasion that the reigning champions of England and Scotland had played each other in a fully competitive European tie. The first leg took place at Elland Road, with a goal in the opening minute from George Connelly giving Celtic a 1–0 lead to take back to Glasgow for the second leg. The return match was played at Hampden Park on 15 April 1970 in front of 136,505 spectators, a record attendance for a competitive European club tie that stands to this day. In 14 minutes, Billy Bremner scored from long range to level the tie on aggregate. Celtic kept their composure though and equalized two minutes into the second half though a John Hughes header. Jimmy Johnstone had a particularly outstanding match and his mazy run set up Bobby Murdoch to score with a powerful shot, sealing a 2–1 win for Celtic on the night and their progression to the final.

The final took place on 6 May 1970 at the San Siro in Milan against Dutch side Feyenoord. Celtic were overwhelming favourites, but despite Tommy Gemmell opening the scoring after 30 minutes, they were comprehensively outplayed by the Dutch side. Feyenoord manager Ernst Happel ensured Jimmy Johnstone was double marked at all times, while the midfield trio of Franz Hasil, Willem van Hanegem and Wim Jansen dominated their Celtic counterparts. Rinus Israël quickly equalized from a free kick, but Celtic managed to hold on at 1–1 to force extra time. With just two minutes of extra time remaining, a long free-kick from the Feyenoord half was sent towards the Celtic penalty area. Billy McNeill stumbled and misjudged the ball, and as he tried to recover he appeared to punch the ball away. Before the referee had a chance to award a penalty, Ove Kindvall reacted quickly and took the ball around his man before chipping it over goalkeeper Evan Williams to seal a 2–1 win for Feyenoord.

Celtic reached the semi-final of the European Cup in 1972, with Inter Milan as their opponents. The tie remained goal-less after the end of both games and 30 minutes of extra time in the second leg in Glasgow. As such, the tie went to penalty kicks to find a winner, only the second time a European Cup tie was decided in this manner. Inter Milan's Sandro Mazzola took the first penalty kick and scored. Dixie Deans took the next penalty, Celtic's first, but fired his shot over the crossbar. The Italians scored all of their remaining penalties to eliminate Celtic.

Two years later in 1974, Celtic again made a European Cup semi-final, this time against Atlético Madrid. The tie against the Spaniards was acrimonious. Atlético were managed by Juan Carlos Lorenzo, who had coached Argentina at the 1966 FIFA World Cup where his players were branded "animals" by England manager Alf Ramsey. In the first leg at Parkhead, the Atlético players continually kicked and hacked their opponents. Three Atlético players were sent off, but their incessant foul play made it impossible, indeed physically dangerous, for Celtic to play their normal game. The match finished 0–0, and the sour evening was completed with a punch-up between the two sets of players as they made their way up the tunnel at full-time. In the buildup for the second leg in Spain, Jimmy Johnstone received a death threat over the hotel phone and a hate campaign from the Spanish media prevented the Celtic players from relaxing or training effectively. Atlético won the match 2–0, winning the tie on aggregate and progressing to the final against Bayern Munich where the Spanish side lost 4–0 after a replay.

==== Decline ====
The mid-to-late 1970s saw a decline in Celtic's European achievements, with first-round exits in the European Cup against Olympiacos in 1974 and in the UEFA Cup against Wisła Kraków in 1976. In between these very brief campaigns, Celtic reached the quarter-finals of the Cup Winners' Cup in season 1975–76, but disappointingly were knocked out by East German side Sachsenring Zwickau, whose play was unimpressive despite winning the tie. The tie is best remembered for the bizarre situation where young Roy Aitken had to be 'adopted' by Celtic to be allowed to enter East Germany to play the away leg. At only 17 years old, the authorities there did not consider him to be an adult. Celtic's last European campaign under Jock Stein was again very short, a second round exit against Wacker Innsbruck in the 1977–78 European Cup. Celtic's failure to win any trophies that season, or finish high enough in the league, saw them fail to qualify for any of the European competitions in season 1978–79; the first season Celtic had not competed in Europe since the early 1960s.

However, in 1979–80, under former player and new manager Billy McNeill, they reached the quarter-finals of the European Cup. Celtic were drawn against Real Madrid, and goals from George McCluskey and Johnny Doyle gave Celtic a 2–0 win in the first leg at Parkhead. Goalkeeper Peter Latchford had an excellent match, and in particular his saves from England striker Laurie Cunningham and Spanish star Santillana were crucial in helping Celtic keep a clean sheet. The return leg took place two weeks later at the Santiago Bernabéu Stadium in front of approximately 120,000 fans. Johnny Doyle missed an excellent chance to score early in the first half, and then just before half-time Santillana pulled a goal back for Real. Uli Stielike levelled the tie in the second half with a powerful volley past Latchford, before Juanito added a third near the end to send Celtic out 3–2 on aggregate.

=== 1980s and 1990s ===
==== False starts ====
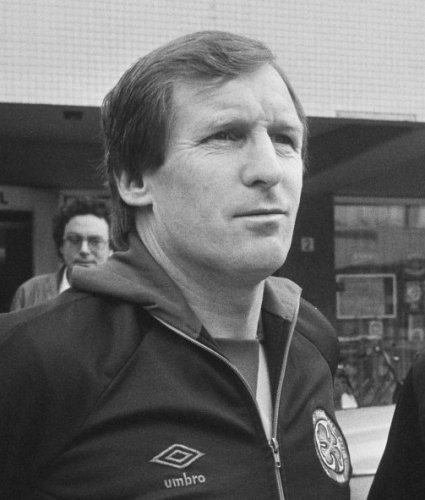
Billy McNeill in September 1982

Celtic's first European campaign of the decade ended inauspiciously in October 1980 when they were knocked out at the first round stage of the European Cup Winners' Cup on away goals by Romanian side Politehnica Timișoara. The following season saw the club take part in the European Cup. Murdo MacLeod's left foot drive past Dino Zoff gave Celtic a 1–0 win in the first leg of the first-round tie against Juventus, however the Italians won the return match 2–0 in Turin to eliminate Celtic.

Ajax were Celtic's first-round European Cup opponents in September 1982. The first leg in Glasgow saw Ajax twice take the lead through goals from Jesper Olsen and Søren Lerby, but Celtic responded with strikes from Charlie Nicholas and Frank McGarvey to draw 2–2 on the night. Celtic went into the second leg as underdogs, but an outstanding Charlie Nicholas goal and a last minute winner from George McCluskey saw the club progress 3–2 on aggregate. Nicholas has since described his goal in Amsterdam as being "probably my all-time favorite". Celtic were unable to keep up their winning form in the next round, and went out of Europe 3–2 on aggregate to Real Sociedad, largely due to poor defending.

The 1983–84 season saw Celtic competing in the UEFA Cup. After a straightforward 5–1 aggregate win over AGF Aarhus in September 1983, Celtic were then drawn against Sporting CP in the second round. The first leg away in Lisbon on 19 October saw Celtic start brightly but fade very quickly, and were fortunate to lose only 2–0. Manager Davie Hay admitted Celtic were "lucky" to not concede more goals, although he insisted that whilst they were in an "awkward position" to salvage the tie, it was not "impossible". Celtic's response two weeks later in the return match in Glasgow saw them produce a performance described by The Herald as "quite brilliant". Tommy Burns ran the show for Celtic and opened the scoring on 17 minutes with a headed goal. Shortly before half-time, Tom McAdam levelled the tie with a powerful shot. On half-time, Brian McClair took a pass from Frank McGarvey, ran 30 yards before shooting in to put Celtic ahead on aggregate. Further goals in the second half from Murdo MacLeod and McGarvey sealed an emphatic 5–0 win on the night and progression to the third round. Having replaced Billy McNeill as manager in the summer, Davie Hay described the win as "the best performance since I took over". Celtic's next opponents were Nottingham Forest, and a scoreless draw away in the first leg put them in a strong position. Celtic dominated the match, with Forest manager Brian Clough acknowledging that Celtic "played really well" and had been "the best team on the night". The second leg, however, proved to be an anti-climax for Celtic as Forest outplayed them, easing to a 2–1 win on the night to eliminate the Scots.

==== The Rapid Vienna affair and fall-out ====
Celtic began their 1984–85 European Cup Winners' Cup campaign against Belgian side K.A.A. Gent. A 1–0 loss away in the first leg, was recovered comfortably in the return match at Parkhead. Frank McGarvey levelled the tie before half-time with a close-range shot after the Belgian goalkeeper failed to hold onto a Brian McClair shot. McGarvey put Celtic ahead with another goal early in the second half, before Paul McStay sealed a 3–0 win with a header on 89 minutes.

Celtic then found themselves embroiled in a series of controversial matches in the second round against Rapid Wien. Celtic lost the first leg 1–3 in Vienna, but despite rough-house tactics from the Austrians, it was only Celtic's Alan McInally who found himself red-carded. The return match at Parkhead was an even more bad-tempered affair as Celtic raced to a 3–0 lead with goals from Brian McClair, Murdo MacLeod and Tommy Burns, all in spite of Rapid's foul play. The match erupted near the end when Burns was punched by Reinhard Kienast. In the ensuing chaos, coins and at least one bottle were thrown onto the pitch by some Celtic fans. None appeared to hit anybody, but one of the Rapid Wien players, Rudi Weinhofer, was carried off the pitch with his head swathed in bandages. The match finished 3–0, with Celtic winning the tie 4–3 on aggregate.

Rapid, however, appealed, citing the alleged injury to their player. The initial appeal was dismissed by UEFA, but a second appeal from the club was upheld and a replay was ordered to take place at least 150 kilometres (90 miles) from Glasgow. The Celtic board acquiesced to this decision in spite of considered opinion that Celtic should withdraw from the tournament on principle. As such, the match at Parkhead was declared void and a third match was held in Manchester at Old Trafford. Celtic lost 0–1, the goal coming on 18 minutes when after Roy Aitken had hit the post with an effort for Celtic, Rapid immediately caught Celtic on the break to score the only goal of the game. Worse, two Celtic fans assaulted Rapid Wien players; one fan ran onto the pitch and accosted the goalkeeper during the game, whilst at full-time another Rapid player was kicked by a fan. UEFA fined Celtic and ordered their next home European tie to take place behind closed doors.

The repercussions from the Rapid Wien ties followed Celtic into the 1985–86 European Cup Winners' Cup campaign. The first round saw them pitted against old foes Atlético Madrid. Mo Johnston's headed goal from a Davie Provan cross and Pat Bonner's late penalty save from Juan Jose Rubio secured a 1–1 draw away in Madrid, putting Celtic in a good position to win the tie. The second leg in Glasgow, however, was played in front of an empty stadium as punishment for the fans' behaviour the previous season in the replayed game against Rapid. In the unreal atmosphere of playing behind closed doors, Celtic toiled and lost 2–1 for another early European exit.

==== Years in the wilderness ====
The club's League title win in 1986 saw them qualify for the European Cup in 1986–87, where Celtic eliminated Shamrock Rovers 3–0 on aggregate in the first round. The next round saw Celtic take on Soviet champions Dynamo Kyiv, a side comprising a large number of players in their national side. A hard-fought 1–1 draw in the first leg at Parkhead did not bode well for the return match in Kiev. Oleh Blokhin's free-kick in the second leg gave the Soviet's an early lead, but Mark McGhee levelled the tie shortly after half-time. Dynamo regained the lead later on in the second half, but Celtic continued to press. A late third goal from Dynamo, however, saw them clinch the tie.

Early exits in Europe continued as the decade progressed. Borussia Dortmund eliminated Celtic in the first round of the UEFA Cup in 1987, while Werder Bremen eliminated Celtic from the European Cup at the second round stage in 1988. In September 1989, Celtic's new Polish striker Dariusz Dziekanowski scored four goals at Parkhead in the second leg of a first round European Cup Winners Cup encounter with Partizan Belgrade, but the team still went out of the competition under the away goals rule. Celtic were very poor that season, and failed to qualify for any of the European competitions in 1990–91 for the first time in 12 years.

Celtic were back in Europe for the 1991–92 UEFA Cup under new manager Liam Brady, but lost 5–1 in the first leg of the first round to Swiss side Neuchâtel Xamax as Egyptian striker Hossam Hassan ran amok against the Celtic defense by scoring four goals, one of the worst European defeats in the club's history. In the return leg at Celtic Park, Celtic could only manage a 1–0 victory and crashed out of the tournament 5–2 on aggregate.

The following season, Liam Brady was struggling as Celtic manager, but enjoyed a brief respite in the first round of the UEFA Cup. Celtic recovered from a 2–0 first leg defeat away at Cologne in the UEFA Cup to win the return match in Glasgow 3–0, midfielder John Collins scoring the decisive third goal seven minutes from time. Celtic were drawn against another German side in the next round, Borussia Dortmund. In the first leg away in Dortmund, Celtic turned in a good performance; Paul McStay and John Collins constantly troubled the Dortmund defence. Celtic came close to scoring after hitting the crossbar, and were unlucky to lose 1–0. Gerry Creaney levelled the tie on aggregate with a first-half goal in Glasgow. Dortmund, however, took control in the second half, scored twice and sent Celtic out 3–1 on aggregate.

Celtic again featured in the UEFA Cup in season 1993–94, knocking out Young Boys Bern 1–0 on aggregate, with the second leg at Celtic Park going to extra time. The winning goal was an own goal by Berne's Alain Baumann, and the match itself is more remembered for stadium announcer "Tiger" Tim Stevens' mocking comment at half-time about Rangers being knocked out of European competition the same evening (he asked for a "minute's silence"): He was in turn sacked on the spot by the Celtic board of directors. The second round saw Celtic drawn against Sporting CP. A credible performance at home in the first leg resulted in a 1–0 win, Creaney controlling a Paul Byrne pass with his chest on the edge of the penalty area and scoring with a powerful shot. But the Portuguese side won 2–0 in the return match, to knock Celtic out.

Celtic failed to qualify for Europe in season 1994–95, but their Scottish Cup Final win in 1995 under new manager Tommy Burns (the club's first trophy in six years) saw them return to European competition the following season in the European Cup Winner's Cup. Georgian side, Dinamo Batumi, were beaten 7–2 on aggregate in the first round. Paris Saint-Germain were the second round opponents, and a narrow 1–0 loss away in Paris kept hopes high that Celtic could turn the tie around at Celtic Park. However, despite a bright start, Celtic ended up being comprehensively outclassed. Two Patrice Loko goals for PSG in the first half put the tie beyond Celtic, with Pascal Nouma adding a third in the second half. Such was the quality of the French side's football, the Celtic supporters gave them a standing ovation at full-time. PSG would go on to win the Cup Winner's Cup that season, defeating Rapid Vienna in the final Celtic returned to the UEFA Cup for the following season, but they did not progress far: They defeated Košice 1–0 on aggregate in a qualifying round, then lost 2–0 in both legs of the first round proper to Hamburger SV to go out 4–0 on aggregate.

Under new Head Coach Wim Jansen, Celtic had to negotiate two qualifying rounds to qualify for the first round proper of the 1997–98 UEFA Cup. Welsh Inter Cabel-Tel were comfortably disposed of 8–0 on aggregate, but the next qualifying round against Tirol Innsbruck proved more difficult. An abysmal first-leg performance in Austria was salvaged only by a late Alan Stubbs free kick, Celtic losing 2–1 on the night but netting a valuable away goal. The return match in Glasgow was an exciting see-saw affair. Celtic twice took the lead in the first half, only for Innsbruck to equalise on each occasion, their second goal an own goal by Henrik Larsson just before half-time. Goals in the second half from Simon Donnelly and Craig Burley put Celtic ahead on aggregate, but Gernot Krinner's header on 82 minutes levelled the tie on aggregate and gave the Austrians the advantage because of the away goals rule. But Celtic responded with three minutes to go, Wieghorst showed excellent skill in the penalty box to control Donnelly's knockdown before shooting in. With the match going into injury time and the tie poised on a knife edge, Larsson went on a solo run forward, beating several tackles, before passing to Burley who scored from close range to clinch a 6–3 win on the night to progress on aggregate. Celtic were then drawn against Liverpool in the first round proper.

Celtic went into the first leg in Glasgow as massive underdogs, and the match seemed to be going as expected when 17-year-old Michael Owen put the English side ahead on 6 minutes. Celtic continued to struggle during the opening 20 minutes but began to find form as the first half progressed. The start of the second half saw Celtic pushing forward more and they equalized on 53 minutes. Jackie McNamara raced down the right wing, played a one-two with Craig Burley, then volleyed a powerful shot past David James. Simon Donnelly hit the post on 62 minutes, then a minute later the referee ignored what appeared to be a blatant foul on him in the penalty box. Celtic continued to press forward, and on 73 minutes were awarded a penalty when Larsson fell on being challenged by David James in the penalty box. Donnelly converted the resultant spot kick to put Celtic ahead. With full-time approaching, Steve McManaman picked the ball from inside his own half, dribbled 70 yards to the edge of the Celtic penalty box and curled a shot to level the match at 2–2. The return match at Anfield produced fewer chances and no goals, seeing Liverpool knock out Celtic on away goals.

Celtic's league title win in 1998 gave the club their first opportunity to compete in the rebranded UEFA Champions League in 1998–99. Two qualifying rounds had first to be negotiated, however. St Patrick's Athletic were knocked out, but Celtic were then paired up against a strong Croatia Zagreb side comprising several players who had helped Croatia to third place at the 1998 World Cup. The first leg took place in Glasgow amidst a row between Celtic players and the club bosses over bonuses. A Darren Jackson goal gave Celtic a 1–0 win to take over to Zagreb, but an insipid second leg performance in match dominated by Robert Prosinečki saw Celtic beaten 3–0 to go out on aggregate. Only a fine showing from Jonathan Gould in goal saved Celtic from a more emphatic defeat. The club dropped into the UEFA Cup. Portuguese side Vitória de Guimarães were defeated 2–1 in both legs in the first round, but Celtic crashed out in the second round against Zürich 5–3 on aggregate as a public row between captain Paul Lambert and managing director Jock Brown raged behind the scenes.

=== 2000–2010 ===
==== Regaining respect ====
New Celtic manager Martin O'Neill's first European tie was a qualifying tie for the UEFA Cup against Jeunesse Esch in August 2000. Having won the first game in Luxembourg 4–0, Celtic went on to ease to a 7–0 win in the return match in Glasgow. The match is notable for Mark Burchill's three goals scored in the space of three minutes, the quickest hat-trick in the history of a UEFA club competition. Celtic went on to eliminate HJK Helsinki in the first round proper, before going out 3–2 on aggregate in the next round to Bordeaux.

Having won the league title in 2001, Martin O'Neill's side then played Ajax in the Netherlands in the first leg of the qualifier tie for the Champions League on 8 August 2001. Celtic turned in an outstanding performance. First-half goals from Dutch winger Bobby Petta and Didier Agathe gave the Scottish champions a 2–1 lead at half-time. Chris Sutton added a third in the second half with a powerful header to give Celtic an impressive 3–1 win. A nervy second leg performance at Parkhead saw Celtic lose 0–1 on the night but progress to the group stages on aggregate; their first involvement in the Champions League group stages since the redevelopment of the tournament in the 1990s.

Celtic made their debut in the group stages of the Champions League on 18 September 2001, losing 2–3 to Juventus in Turin. Celtic had recovered from a 2–0 deficit to level the match at 2–2, but lost a third goal near the end from a controversial penalty. Celtic recovered from that set-back to win their next two home matches against Porto and Rosenborg, but lost the away matches against the same opposition. Celtic's final group match was against Juventus at Parkhead on 31 October 2001. A Chris Sutton brace and an outstanding performance from Ľubomír Moravčík helped Celtic to a famous 4–3 win. Despite finishing the group with nine points, however, Celtic failed to qualify for the next round and were demoted to the UEFA Cup. They were drawn against Valencia, where in the first leg in Spain, the club had goalkeeper Rab Douglas to thank for keeping the score to a manageable 0–1 defeat. The second leg in Glasgow saw Henrik Larsson scoring to give Celtic a 1–0 win after 90 minutes to level the tie on aggregate. As no goals were scored during extra-time, the tie went to penalty-kicks, where Celtic lost, suffering elimination.

==== Impact in Europe ====
Celtic's European campaign in 2002–03 began somewhat inauspiciously when they were beaten by Basel on away goals in a qualifier tie for the Champions League. Celtic dropped into the UEFA Cup, and in the first round eased to a 10–1 aggregate win over Lithuanian minnows FK Sūduva. In the next round, Celtic were paired with Blackburn Rovers, managed by former Rangers player-manager Graeme Souness. Celtic played poorly in the first leg at Parkhead, but a Henrik Larsson goal six minutes from full-time secured a crucial 1–0 win on the night and a narrow lead to take down to Ewood Park. In the build-up to the return match, Blackburn captain Gary Flitcroft made public that Souness had commented in the dressing room after the first game that Blackburn were the better side and should have won: "That was men against boys." In the second leg, Celtic showed much more composure and scored after 14 minutes through Larsson. Celtic controlled the game after that and Chris Sutton scored another goal for Celtic in the second half, with Celtic winning 2–0 on the night and 3–0 on aggregate. Celtic's third round UEFA cup opponents were Celta de Vigo. In a first-leg overshadowed by eccentric refereeing, Henrik Larsson scored the only goal of the game in Glasgow. The return match in Spain was won 2–1 by Celta, levelling the aggregate score at 2–2, but John Hartson's away goal won the tie for Celtic. This was the first time ever that Celtic had knocked out a Spanish club in European competition, and also the first time in 23 years that Celtic had remained in European competition beyond Christmas.

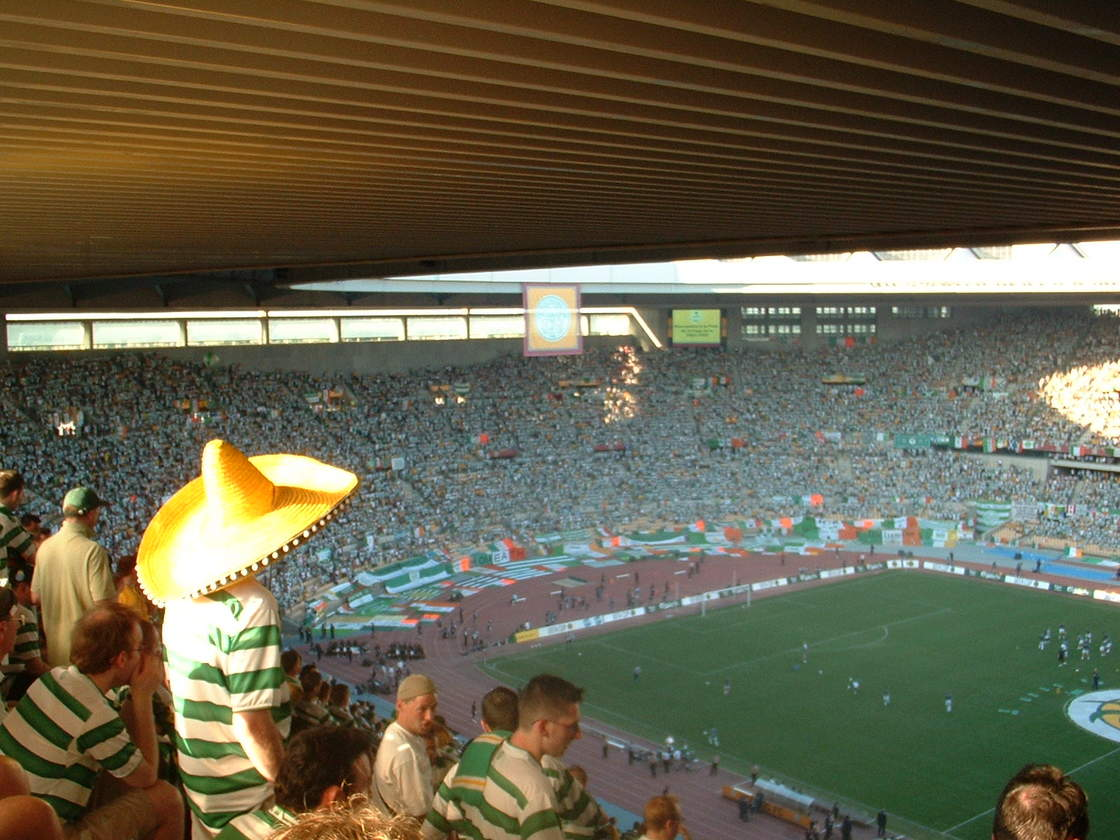
Celtic fans at the UEFA Cup Final in Seville

German Bundesliga team VfB Stuttgart were Celtic's fourth round opponents in the Spring of 2003. Celtic came from behind to win the first leg 3–1 at Parkhead, while in the second leg, despite Celtic going up 2–0 early, a comeback from Stuttgart saw the Bundesliga side win 3–2 on the night, although Celtic would progress 5–4 on aggregate. The quarter-finals saw another English Premier League opponent for Celtic, this time Liverpool. The first leg took place at Celtic Park on 13 March 2003, ending 1–1 through a first-minute Larsson goal; the away goal, however, gave Liverpool an advantage entering their home tie at Anfield. In the first leg, Liverpool player El Hadji Diouf spat at a Celtic supporter, and was later fined £5,000 at Glasgow's Sheriff Court for the incident. The return match at Anfield took place the following week. Two minutes from half-time, Celtic were awarded a free-kick 25 yards from goal. Alan Thompson struck a low shot past Jerzy Dudek from the set piece, with the ball going under the defensive wall which had jumped up and appeared to distract the Liverpool goalkeeper. Celtic sealed a 2–0 victory on 82 minutes when John Hartson played a one-two with Larsson, then drove a swerving shot from 25 yards out into the top-right corner of Dudek's goal.

Celtic's first European semi-final since the early 1970s saw them paired against Portuguese side Boavista. Celtic drew 1–1 in the first game at Parkhead, but a Henrik Larsson goal in the 80th minute of the return match in Portugal won the tie and ensured Celtic's progress to the UEFA Cup Final.

Around 80,000 Celtic fans travelled to watch the club compete in the UEFA Cup Final, held in Seville on 21 May 2003. Played in humid weather, the first half was a somewhat stoic affair, but Porto scored just before half-time when Derlei netted Dmitri Alenichev's parried shot. Celtic levelled two minutes into the second half when Henrik Larsson headed Didier Agathe's cross from the right past goalkeeper Vitor Baiai. Porto regained the lead five minutes later when Deco's angled pass to Alenichev saw the Russian score. Again Celtic rallied, with Larsson scoring with another header, this time from an Alan Thompson corner. Celtic were however frustrated by the referee's over-indulgence of Porto's time-wasting and their players' persistent feigning of injury. With the game tied at 2–2 on 90 minutes, the final went into extra time. Bobo Baldé was sent off on 95 minutes after his second yellow card. On 112 minutes Derlei reacted quickest to a Rab Douglas block and rounded Jackie McNamara to make it 3–2. Porto managed to hang on to win the UEFA Cup. Nonetheless, the exemplary conduct of the thousands of travelling Celtic supporters received widespread praise from the people of Seville and the fans were awarded prestigious Fair Play Awards from both FIFA and UEFA "for their extraordinarily loyal and sporting behaviour".

Celtic qualified for the Champions League in 2003–04, but again could only finish third in the group stages and therefore dropped into the UEFA Cup. After a straightforward aggregate win over FK Teplice, Celtic were drawn against Barcelona in the round of 16. A dramatic first leg in Glasgow saw Celtic win 1–0 through an Alan Thompson goal, but goalkeeper Rab Douglas and Barcelona's Thiago Motta were sent off during half-time for fighting in the tunnel. The return match in Spain saw Celtic fielding 19-year-old reserve goalkeeper David Marshall in place of Douglas and young defender John Kennedy standing in for Bobo Baldé, who was also suspended. Celtic found themselves under a sustained barrage of pressure, but the two youngsters turned in outstanding performances. Marshall pulled off outstanding saves from Luis Enrique and Luis García, while Kennedy made a number of great tackles to keep Barcelona at bay. Celtic held out for a scoreless draw on the night to win on aggregate and progress to the quarter-finals. Celtic's run in Europe was finally ended in the next round by another Spanish side, Villarreal, losing 3–1 on aggregate. The club went straight into the group stages for the 2004–05 UEFA Champions League, but finished bottom of their group on five points, one point behind Shakhtar Donetsk who qualified for the UEFA Cup spot, and behind Barcelona and AC Milan who progressed to the next stage of the Champions League. This was Martin O'Neill's last European campaign with Celtic, with him resigning in May 2005 to care for his ill wife.

Gordon Strachan made an unpromising start as manager of Celtic in the summer of 2005, losing his first match in charge – a Champions League qualifier – 0–5 to Slovak side Artmedia Bratislava, the club's worst ever European result at that time. Celtic did produce a fight-back in the second leg at Parkhead, but their 4–0 win on the night was not enough to salvage the tie.

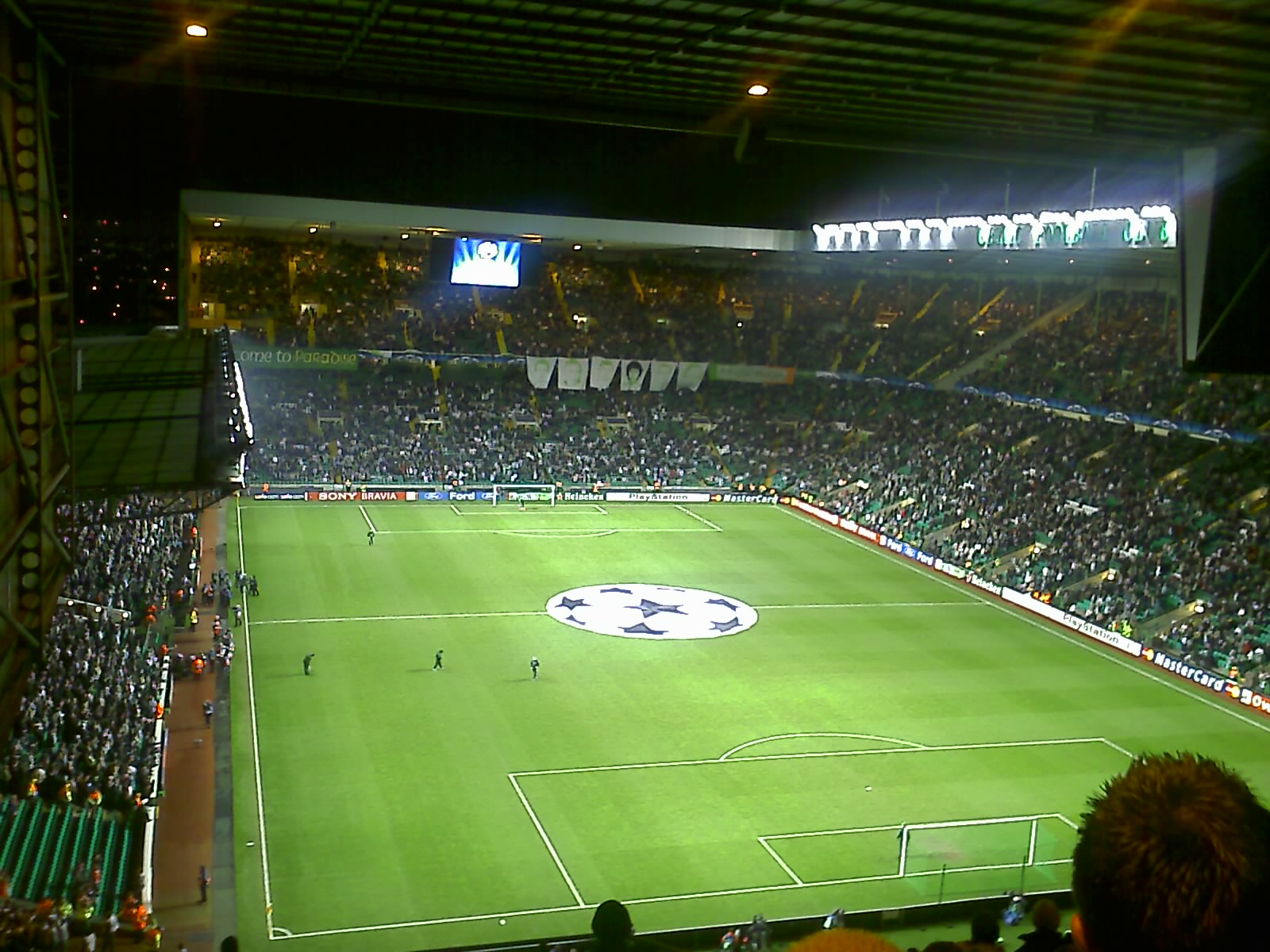
Celtic Park before kick-off in a Champions League tie against Benfica in November 2007

The following season though saw Strachan guide Celtic into last 16 of the Champions League for the first time. Celtic secured their progress from the group stages courtesy of Shunsuke Nakamura's 30-yard free-kick against Manchester United in a 1–0 win at Parkhead. The win on the night, and qualification to the last 16, was clinched when Artur Boruc saved Louis Saha's 88th-minute penalty kick. Celtic lost 0–1 in the last 16 round to the eventual winners of the cup, AC Milan, after a goal from Kaká in extra time.

Strachan took Celtic to the last 16 of the Champions League again in 2007–08, were they paired up against Barcelona. The first leg was played in Glasgow, and Celtic twice took the lead through goals from Jan Vennegoor of Hesselink and Barry Robson. Barcelona fought back, however, to win 3–2 on the night. In the return match, a goal by Xavi saw Barça win 1–0 in Spain and knock Celtic out 4–2 on aggregate.

Tony Mowbray took charge of Celtic in 2009. The club's final league position of the previous season meant that two qualifying rounds were required to enter the Champions League group stages. After a 1–0 loss to Dynamo Moscow at home, Mowbray lead Celtic to a 2–0 win in Moscow, Georgios Samaras' injury time goal clinching the tie on aggregate and ending a long run of not winning any away games in the Champions League. This was also the first time ever that Celtic had won a European tie after losing the first leg at home. Celtic were then drawn with English side Arsenal, where they would lose the home leg 2–0. In the return leg in the Emirates Stadium, Celtic were holding Arsenal 0–0 until Arsenal striker Eduardo won his club a controversial penalty, which he himself converted. Arsenal went on to win 3–1 win on the night, with Massimo Donati scoring Celtic's only goal in the last minute. Things began to slide after that, however, and Celtic exited the rebranded UEFA Europa League before Christmas despite a promising draw of group opponents.

=== 2010–2020 ===
==== Neil Lennon & Ronny Deila ====
Neil Lennon became manager in 2010, but despite winning their home games, Celtic went out of both the Champions League and Europa League at the first hurdles, losing 4–2 on aggregate against both eventual Europa League finalists Braga and Dutch side Utrecht.

Celtic qualified for the Europa League group stages in 2011–12 in bizarre circumstances. Swiss side Sion defeated Celtic 3–1 on aggregate in the qualifying tie. Sion, however, were thrown out of the tournament by UEFA due to them fielding ineligible players in the two games against Celtic. Celtic were thus reinstated, eventually finishing third in Group I, behind Atlético Madrid and Udinese and ahead of Rennes.

As Scottish Champions from 2011 to 2012, Celtic had the opportunity to take part in the 2012–13 Champions League. However, two qualifying rounds had first to be negotiated, which Celtic managed to do with 4–1 and 4–0 aggregate wins over HJK Helsinki and Helsingborgs IF. Celtic, as fourth-ranked seeds, found themselves drawn in Group G with Barcelona, Benfica and Spartak Moscow.

On 2 October 2012, Celtic achieved their first-ever away win in the group stages of the Champions League with a 3–2 win in Russia over Spartak Moscow, Georgios Samaras scoring the winning goal in the 90th minute. Celtic's home match with Barcelona in November 2012 coincided with the week of Celtic's 125th Anniversary. As such, an "Ultras"-styled section of the Celtic support called the Green Brigade organised a full stadium pre-match card display (a "tifo") to celebrate the club's 125th anniversary. The display featured a Celtic cross, green and white hoops and "125 Celtic" in written form, with supporters earning the praise of club chairman Peter Lawwell. A memorable night was completed when goals from Victor Wanyama and 18-year-old striker Tony Watt gave Celtic a shock 2–1 win over Barcelona. Goalkeeper Fraser Forster produced an outstanding performance in the game, winning the praise of the Spanish media who nicknamed him "La Gran Muralla" ("The Great Wall").

Celtic secured their progress to the knock-out stages of the Champions League on 5 December 2012 with a 2–1 home win over Spartak Moscow, Kris Commons scoring the winning goal in 82 minutes with a penalty. Celtic were drawn against Juventus but succumbed to 5–0 aggregate defeat in the Spring of 2013 to go out of the tournament. Despite the emphatic score line over the two legs, Celtic were not outclassed by their Italian opponents in terms of general play but while Juventus defended with a ruthless defiance, Celtic in contrast shipped their goals all far too easily. Despite the result against Juventus, Celtic and Neil Lennon won praise for their Champions League campaign.

Celtic began the 2013–14 season with further Champions League success in their sights. Celtic were drawn with Cliftonville in their first qualifying round and easily disposed of the Northern Irish champions 5–0 on aggregate. They were next drawn with IF Elfsborg and squeezed by with a 1–0 aggregate win, with Kris Commons scoring the only goal in the first leg at Celtic Park. Although favored to qualify for the group stages with minimal challenge after being drawn with Kazakh champions Shakhter Karagandy, Celtic found themselves losing the first leg in Karagandy 2–0. Celtic returned to Scotland to an electric atmosphere at Celtic Park in the home leg, in what proved to be the high point of their 2013–14 Champions League campaign. They overcame the 2–0 deficit to level the aggregate thanks to goals by Kris Commons and Georgios Samaras. James Forrest completed the comeback for Celtic with a 90th-minute strike, sending Celtic Park into a frenzy.

Thereafter, Celtic found themselves drawn with AC Milan, Ajax and again Barcelona in the group stage. The campaign was dismal, winning only once with a 2–1 home win over Ajax, and slumping to a 6–1 rout away against Barcelona in the final group match. That game saw Celtic concede the most goals they had ever done in a single European tie, and equaled their previous heaviest defeat in Europe, a 5–0 loss to Artmedia Bratislava.

Ronny Deila's first competitive match in charge of Celtic was a Champions League qualifying tie away against KR Reykjavik on 15 July 2014, which ended in a 1–0 win with midfielder Callum McGregor scoring the decisive goal on 84 minutes. Celtic eased to a 4–0 win in the return match in Scotland, but were comprehensively beaten and outplayed in the next qualifying round, losing 6–1 on aggregate to Legia Warsaw. Despite this, Celtic were given a reprieve when it was discovered that Legia had fielded an ineligible player in the second leg, Bartosz Bereszynski coming on as a substitute in the last four minutes. UEFA punished the Polish club by awarding the game a 3–0 to Celtic, levelling the aggregate score at 4–4 and seeing the Scottish champions progress on away goals. Despite this astonishing piece of luck, Celtic failed abjectly to take advantage in the final qualifier against Maribor, losing 2–1 on aggregate to drop down to the Europa League.

Celtic qualified from their Europa League group. They played Inter Milan in the last 16 stage of the Europa League, rallying to draw 3–3 at Parkhead from an early 0–2 deficit in a pulsating encounter, then losing 1–0 in Milan to go out on aggregate despite a highly credible performance.

Celtic began the 2015–16 season again attempting to qualify for the Champions League. They knocked out Stjarnan from Iceland and Qarabağ from Azerbaijan in the early qualifying rounds, but lost 4–3 on aggregate to Swedish side Malmö FF in the final play-off round. This meant for the second successive season, Celtic dropped into the Europa League. Celtic's Europa League campaign was poor and littered with individual errors which contributed to dropped points in every match. Celtic failed to qualify after finishing bottom of their group, and was the first time Celtic went through a group stage of a European competition without recording a single victory.

==== Brendan Rodgers ====
Celtic's first competitive match under new manager Brendan Rodgers, saw the team lose 1–0 against Gibraltarian minnows Lincoln Red Imps in the first leg of the Second Round 2016–17 Champions League qualifiers, a result described by The Scotsman as a "humiliation". Celtic won the second leg 3–0 to progress on aggregate and went on to eliminate FC Astana and Hapoel Be'er Sheva in the subsequent qualifying rounds to progress into the Champions League group stages for the first time since 2013. The team's opening match in the Champions League proper on 13 September 2016 proved to be a humbling experience though as Barcelona delivered a footballing lesson in a 7–0 rout; the club's heaviest ever European defeat and the second heaviest in the club's history. A level of pride was restored in the next Champions League tie, Celtic holding Manchester City to a 3–3 draw at Celtic Park, with new signing Moussa Dembélé scoring twice, and ending the high-spending English club's run of 10 consecutive wins. Further draws away at Borussia Mönchengladbach and in the return match at Manchester City saw Celtic finish the group on three points, coming fourth and going out of Europe.

Celtic entered the 2017–18 Champions League at the 2nd qualifying round; they defeated Linfield 6–0, Rosenborg 1–0 and Astana 8–4 on aggregate to enter the group stages. Celtic gained only three points over the six games with a 3–0 away win – their first European group stage victory in 16 attempts – at Anderlecht, and finished in third place despite losing 5–0 and 7–1 to Paris Saint Germain. By finishing third in the Champions League group, Celtic qualified for the knockout Round of 32 in the Europa League where they were drawn against Zenit Saint Petersburg. Celtic won the first leg 1–0 after a late winner by Callum McGregor, but succumbed to a disappointing 3–0 defeat in Saint Petersburg and were subsequently knocked out of the competition.

Celtic were eliminated from the 2018–19 Champions League qualifying phase by AEK Athens in the penultimate round, subsequently progressing to the group stage of the Europa League, where they were drawn alongside the two clubs with strong links to the Red Bull company – RB Leipzig and Red Bull Salzburg – along with Rosenborg. In the opening round of fixtures, Celtic secured a narrow 1–0 home victory over the Norwegian champions through a header by Leigh Griffiths in the closing minutes; in doing so they achieved a win on Matchday 1 for the first time in fifteen group stage participations across the two UEFA competitions (dating back to 2001), as well as a first group stage win at Celtic Park in eleven attempts (since Dinamo Zagreb were beaten in 2014). Celtic exchanged wins with RB Leipzig, and Red Bull Salzburg defeated their 'sister team' Leipzig and Celtic in both home and away ties. Rosenborg helped Celtic to qualify from the group despite the Scottish champions losing at home to Salzburg; the Norwegians scoring a late equalizer against Leipzig in Germany which put the Hoops ahead on points when they had been behind the German side on the tiebreak methods. In the last 32 they were drawn to face Valencia, with the Spanish side subsequently winning the tie 3–0 on aggregate to knock Celtic out.

==== Return of Neil Lennon ====
The early rounds of the 2019–20 Champions League qualifying phase saw Celtic ease past FK Sarajevo and Nõmme Kalju with comfortable aggregate victories. However, chaotic defending in the following round against Romanian champions CFR Cluj saw Celtic lose 4–3 at home (despite leading 2–1 and 3–2 at stages during the second half) to go out 5–4 on aggregate and drop down to the play-off round for the Europa League. Billel Omrani was particularly influential for the Romanians, scoring twice and providing an assist for their opening goal. European football until December was guaranteed, however, with a 6–1 aggregate win over AIK Stockholm to progress to the group stages of the Europa League.

Celtic were drawn to face CFR Cluj again in the group stage, as well as Italian and French cup winners Lazio and Rennes. In the opening fixture in France, Celtic and Rennes exchanged penalties for a 1–1 draw, the same score line as when the pair first played each other eight years before. Celtic avenged their Champions League exit to CFR Cluj by convincingly beating the Romanians 2–0 in Glasgow, before a double header against title-chasing Lazio. Celtic came from behind at home to beat the Italians 2–1, with an 89th-minute header from Christopher Jullien winning the game. Two weeks later Celtic headed to Rome, having never won on Italian soil before in 13 attempts: They sealed their place in the last 32 with another 2–1 victory over Lazio, again coming from behind. This time it was a 95th-minute winner from Olivier Ntcham which sealed a famous double over the Serie A side. Celtic went on to top a European group for the first time in their history with a home win over Rennes, avoiding defeat in their first five group games for the first time. Celtic played mostly fringe players in their final game in Romania, losing 2–0 in what was a "dead rubber" for the Scottish champions. In the last-32 round, Celtic went out 4–2 on aggregate to F.C. Copenhagen, largely as a result of poor defending (described by BBC Sport as "calamitous") in the second leg at Celtic Park.

Due to the ongoing COVID-19 pandemic, all ties in the qualifying rounds for the two European club competitions in season 2020–21, excluding the play-off round for the Champions League, were played as single leg matches, hosted by one of the teams decided by draw. Celtic were knocked out of the Champions League in the second qualifying round, losing 2–1 at home to Ferencváros, but successfully negotiated the other qualifying rounds to qualify for the group stages of the Europa League. Celtic thereafter had a poor campaign, losing four of the six group matches (including a 4–1 defeat against a Sparta Prague side having to field a virtual reserve team due to players being absent through COVID-19), and finished bottom of the group.

=== 2021– ===
In the 2021/22 season Celtic were eliminated in the second qualifying round of the Champions League after a 2-3 defeat by Midtjylland. Celtic defeated Jablonec and AZ Alkmaar to reach the group stages of the Europa League. Celtic finished third in the group and qualified for the play-off round in the UEFA Europa Conference League where they lost 5-1 on aggregate to Bodø/Glimt.

In 2022, Celtic qualified for the group stage of the 2022–23 UEFA Champions League for the first time since the 2017/18 season. They were placed in Group F with Shakhtar Donetsk, RB Leipzig and reigning champions Real Madrid, ultimately finishing bottom of the group with two points.

In the 2023/24 season, Celtic played in the group stage of the Champions League once again, being placed in a group with Atlético Madrid, Lazio and Feyenoord, finishing bottom of the group with four points but did earn their first Champions League home victory in more than ten years with a 2-1 win over Feyenoord on match day six.

In the 2024/25 season, Celtic played in the newly reformatted league phase of the Champions League, ultimately finishing 21st in the table with three wins, three draws and two defeats, earning a place in the Knockout Phase Play-Offs. Celtic lost 3-2 on aggregate to Bayern Munich, losing the first leg at Celtic Park 2-1 and conceding a late equaliser in Germany to draw 1-1.

In the 2025/26 season, Celtic failed to qualify for the league phase of the Champions League, losing to Kairat Almaty 3-2 on penalties after both legs of the Play-off round tie failed to produce any goals, causing Celtic to drop into the league phase of the Europa League.

== Records ==
- Most appearances in European competition: Scott Brown, 127
- Most goals in European competition: Henrik Larsson, 35
- First European match: Valencia 4–2 Celtic, Inter-Cities Fairs Cup, first round, 24 October 1962
- First goal scored in Europe: Bobby Carroll, against Valencia
- Youngest first-team player in European competition: Karamoko Dembélé, 16 years, 294 days (against CFR Cluj, 12 December 2019)
- Biggest win: Celtic 9–0 KPV Kokkola, in the European Cup, 16 September 1970
- Biggest defeat: Barcelona 7–0 Celtic in the UEFA Champions League, 13 September 2016
- Highest European home attendance (Hampden Park): 136,505, against Leeds United in the 1969–70 European Cup (Note: The home leg of Celtic's 1970 European Cup semi-final tie against Leeds United was switched from Celtic Park (which had a capacity at the time of around 80,000) to Hampden Park due to the expected high demand for tickets.)

(Celtic Park): 77,240, against Fiorentina in the 1969–70 European Cup

Most appearances
Rank	Player	Years	Apps
1	(Scotland) Scott Brown	2007–2021	127
2	(Scotland) James Forrest	2010–	123
3	(Scotland) Callum McGregor	2014–	116
4	(Sweden) Mikael Lustig	2011–2019	76
5	(Scotland) Billy McNeill (Note: Includes 3 appearances in the Intercontinental Cup)	1957–1975	72
6	(Scotland) Bobby Lennox (Note: Includes 3 appearances in the Intercontinental Cup)	1961–1980	67
6	(Scotland) Jimmy Johnstone (Note: Includes 3 appearances in the Intercontinental Cup)	1962–1975	67
8	(Scotland) Craig Gordon	2014–2020	63
9	(Sweden) Henrik Larsson	1997–2004	58
10	(Scotland) Bobby Murdoch (Note: Includes 3 appearances in the Intercontinental Cup)	1959–1973	57

Top goalscorers
Rank	Player	Years	Goals
1	(Sweden) Henrik Larsson	1997–2004	35
2	(Scotland) Jimmy Johnstone	1961–1975	16
2	(England) Chris Sutton	2000–2007	16
4	(Scotland) Leigh Griffiths	2014–2022	15
4	(France) Odsonne Édouard	2018–2021	15
6	(Scotland) Bobby Lennox	1961–1978	14
6	(Scotland) James Forrest	2010–	14
8	(Scotland) Stevie Chalmers	1959–1971	13
8	(Scotland) Willie Wallace	1966–1971	13
8	(Greece) Georgios Samaras	2008–2014	13
11	(Scotland) Tommy Gemmell (Note: Includes one goal scored in the Intercontinental Cup)	1961–1971	12
11	(Scotland) Harry Hood	1969–1976	12
11	(Scotland) Bobby Murdoch	1959–1973	12

As of March 2025, Henrik Larsson is the all-time joint fourteenth top goalscorer in European club football competitions with a total of 59 goals from his time at Feyenoord, Celtic, Barcelona, Manchester United and Helsingborgs IF.

Tommy Gemmell was the first British player to score in two different European Cup finals, scoring in 1967 against Inter Milan and then in 1970 against Feyenoord.

In November 2012, Georgios Samaras became the first Celtic player to score in five consecutive away matches in European club competition.

=== By competition ===
As of match played 17 September 2026

Competition	Pld	W	D	L	GF	GA	GD	Win%
European Cup / Champions League	242	106	46	90	361	307	+54	43.80
UEFA Cup Winners' Cup	38	21	4	13	75	37	+38	55.26
UEFA Cup / Europa League	150	64	31	55	235	197	+38	42.67
UEFA Europa Conference League	2	0	0	2	1	5	−4	0.00
Inter-Cities Fairs Cup	6	1	3	2	9	10	−1	16.67
Intercontinental Cup	3	1	0	2	2	3	−1	33.33
Total	441	193	84	164	683	559	+124	43.76

While the Inter-Cities Fairs Cup is recognised as the predecessor to the UEFA Cup, it was not organised by UEFA. Consequently, UEFA do not consider clubs' records in the Fairs Cup to be part of their official European record.

With regard to the above statistics, Celtic's 3–0 home win over Rapid Wien in 1984 was declared void and a replay ordered to take place, which Celtic lost 1–0. In 2011, Celtic played Sion over two legs, drawing 0–0 at home and losing 3–1 away. However, due to Sion fielding ineligible players, Celtic were awarded 3–0 wins by UEFA for each game. In 2014, Legia Warsaw fielded a suspended player in their 2–0 win over Celtic. UEFA again rescinded this result and awarded a 3–0 win to Celtic. In the above statistics, it is the result of the replayed game and the "walkover" results that are included, not the original scores/results.

=== By season ===
As of match played 17 September 2026

Season	Competition	Round	Opposition	Home Leg	Away Leg	Aggregate
1962–63	Inter-Cities Fairs Cup	First round	(Spain) Valencia	2–2	2–4	4–6
1963–64	UEFA Cup Winners' Cup	Preliminary round	(Switzerland) Basel	5–0	5–1	10–1
1963–64	UEFA Cup Winners' Cup	First round	(Socialist Federal Republic of Yugoslavia) Dinamo Zagreb	3–0	1–2	4–2
1963–64	UEFA Cup Winners' Cup	Quarter-finals	(Czechoslovakia) Slovan Bratislava	1–0	1–0	2–0
1963–64	UEFA Cup Winners' Cup	Semi-finals	(Hungary) MTK Budapest	3–0	0–4	3–4
1964–65	Inter-Cities Fairs Cup	First round	(Portugal) Leixões	1–1	3–0	4–1
1964–65	Inter-Cities Fairs Cup	Second round	(Spain) Barcelona	0–0	1–3	1–3
1965–66	UEFA Cup Winners' Cup	First round	(Netherlands) Go Ahead Eagles	6–0	1–0	7–0
1965–66	UEFA Cup Winners' Cup	Second round	(Denmark) AGF Aarhus	1–0	2–0	3–0
1965–66	UEFA Cup Winners' Cup	Quarter-finals	(Soviet Union) Dynamo Kyiv	3–0	1–1	4–1
1965–66	UEFA Cup Winners' Cup	Semi-finals	(England) Liverpool	1–0	0–2	1–2
1966–67	European Cup	First round	(Switzerland) Zürich	2–0	3–0	5–0
1966–67	European Cup	Second round	(France) Nantes	3–1	3–1	6–2
1966–67	European Cup	Quarter-finals	(Socialist Federal Republic of Yugoslavia) Vojvodina	2–0	0–1	2–1
1966–67	European Cup	Semi-finals	(Czechoslovakia) Dukla Prague	3–1	0–0	3–1
1966–67	European Cup	Final	(Italy) Inter Milan	2–1 (Winners)		
1967–68	European Cup	First round	(Soviet Union) Dynamo Kyiv	1–2	1–1	2–3
1968–69	European Cup	First round	(France) Saint-Étienne	4–0	0–2	4–2
1968–69	European Cup	Second round	(Socialist Federal Republic of Yugoslavia) Red Star Belgrade	5–1	1–1	6–2
1968–69	European Cup	Quarter-finals	(Italy) Milan	0–1	0–0	0–1
1969–70	European Cup	First round	(Switzerland) Basel	0–0	2–0	2–0
1969–70	European Cup	Second round	(Portugal) Benfica	3–0	0–3 (a.e.t.)	3–3^{[A]}
1969–70	European Cup	Quarter-finals	(Italy) Fiorentina	3–0	0–1	3–1
1969–70	European Cup	Semi-finals	(England) Leeds United	2–1	1–0	3–1
1969–70	European Cup	Final	(Netherlands) Feyenoord	1–2 (a.e.t.) (Runners-up)		
1970–71	European Cup	First round	(Finland) KPV	9–0	5–0	14–0
1970–71	European Cup	Second round	(Republic of Ireland) Waterford	7–0	3–2	10–2
1970–71	European Cup	Quarter-finals	(Netherlands) Ajax	1–0	0–3	1–3
1971–72	European Cup	First round	(Denmark) B 1903	3–0	1–2	4–2
1971–72	European Cup	Second round	(Malta) Sliema Wanderers	3–1	3–0	6–1
1971–72	European Cup	Quarter-finals	(Hungary) Újpest	2–1	1–1	3–2
1971–72	European Cup	Semi-finals	(Italy) Inter Milan	0–0 (a.e.t.)	0–0	0–0 (4–5 p)
1972–73	European Cup	First round	(Norway) Rosenborg	2–1	3–1	5–2
1972–73	European Cup	Second round	(Hungary) Újpest	2–1	0–3	2–4
1973–74	European Cup	First round	(Finland) TPS	6–1	3–0	9–1
1973–74	European Cup	Second round	(Denmark) Vejle	0–0	1–0	1–0
1973–74	European Cup	Quarter-finals	(Switzerland) Basel	4–2 (a.e.t.)	2–3	6–5
1973–74	European Cup	Semi-finals	(Spain) Atlético Madrid	0–0	0–2	0–2
1974–75	European Cup	First round	(Greece) Olympiacos	1–1	0–2	1–3
1975–76	UEFA Cup Winners' Cup	First Round	(Iceland) Valur	7–0	2–0	9–0
1975–76	UEFA Cup Winners' Cup	Second Round	(Portugal) Boavista	0–0	3–1	3–1
1975–76	UEFA Cup Winners' Cup	Quarter-finals	(East Germany) Sachsenring Zwickau	1–1	0–1	1–2
1976–77	UEFA Cup	First round	(Poland) Wisła Kraków	2–2	0–2	2–4
1977–78	European Cup	First round	(Luxembourg) Jeunesse Esch	5–0	6–1	11–1
1977–78	European Cup	Second round	(Austria) Wacker Innsbruck	2–1	0–3	2–4
1979–80	European Cup	First round	(Albania) Partizani	4–1	0–1	4–2
1979–80	European Cup	Second round	(Republic of Ireland) Dundalk	3–2	0–0	3–2
1979–80	European Cup	Quarter-finals	(Spain) Real Madrid	2–0	0–3	2–3
1980–81	UEFA Cup Winners' Cup	Preliminary round	(Hungary) Diósgyőri VTK BFC	6–0	1–2	7–2
1980–81	UEFA Cup Winners' Cup	First round	(Romania) Politehnica Timișoara	2–1	0–1	2–2
1981–82	European Cup	First round	(Italy) Juventus	1–0	0–2	1–2
1982–83	European Cup	First round	(Netherlands) Ajax	2–2	2–1	4–3
1982–83	European Cup	Second round	(Spain) Real Sociedad	2–1	0–2	2–3
1983–84	UEFA Cup	First round	(Denmark) AGF Aarhus	1–0	4–1	5–1
1983–84	UEFA Cup	Second round	(Portugal) Sporting CP	5–0	0–2	5–2
1983–84	UEFA Cup	Third round	(England) Nottingham Forest	1–2	0–0	1–2
1984–85	UEFA Cup Winners' Cup	First round	(Belgium) Gent	3–0	0–1	3–1
1984–85	UEFA Cup Winners' Cup	Second round	(Austria) Rapid Wien	0–1^{[B]}	1–3	1–4^{[B]}
1985–86	UEFA Cup Winners' Cup	First round	(Spain) Atlético Madrid	1–2	1–1	2–3
1986–87	European Cup	First round	(Republic of Ireland) Shamrock Rovers	1–0	2–0	3–0
1986–87	European Cup	Second round	(Soviet Union) Dynamo Kyiv	1–1	1–3	2–4
1987–88	UEFA Cup	First round	(West Germany) Borussia Dortmund	2–1	0–2	2–3
1988–89	European Cup	First round	(Hungary) Budapest Honvéd	4–0	0–1	4–1
1988–89	European Cup	Second round	(West Germany) Werder Bremen	0–1	0–0	0–1
1989–90	UEFA Cup Winners' Cup	First Round	(Socialist Federal Republic of Yugoslavia) Partizan	5–4	1–2	6–6 (a)
1991–92	UEFA Cup	First round	(Belgium) Germinal Ekeren	2–0	1–1	3–1
1991–92	UEFA Cup	Second round	(Switzerland) Neuchâtel Xamax	1–0	1–5	2–5
1992–93	UEFA Cup	First round	(Germany) 1. FC Köln	3–0	0–2	3–2
1992–93	UEFA Cup	Second round	(Germany) Borussia Dortmund	0–1	1–2	1–3
1993–94	UEFA Cup	First round	(Switzerland) Young Boys Bern	1–0 (a.e.t.)	0–0	1–0
1993–94	UEFA Cup	Second round	(Portugal) Sporting CP	1–0	0–2	1–2
1995–96	UEFA Cup Winners' Cup	First round	(Georgia (country)) Dinamo Batumi	4–0	3–2	7–2
1995–96	UEFA Cup Winners' Cup	Second round	(France) Paris Saint-Germain	0–3	0–1	0–4
1996–97	UEFA Cup	Qualifying round	(Slovakia) Košice	0–0	1–0	1–0
1996–97	UEFA Cup	First round	(Germany) Hamburger SV	0–2	0–2	0–4
1997–98	UEFA Cup	First qualifying round	(Wales) Inter CableTel	5–0	3–0	8–0
1997–98	UEFA Cup	Second qualifying round	(Austria) Tirol Innsbruck	6–3	1–2	7–5
1997–98	UEFA Cup	First round	(England) Liverpool	2–2	0–0	2–2 (a)
1998–99	UEFA Champions League	First qualifying round	(Republic of Ireland) St Patrick's Athletic	0–0	2–0	2–0
1998–99	UEFA Champions League	Second qualifying round	Croatia Zagreb	1–0	0–3	1–3
1998–99	UEFA Cup	First round	(Portugal) Vitória de Guimarães	2–1	2–1	4–2
1998–99	UEFA Cup	Second round	(Switzerland) Zürich	1–1	2–4	3–5
1999– 2000	UEFA Cup	Qualifying round	(Wales) Cwmbrân Town	6–0	4–0	10–0
1999– 2000	UEFA Cup	First round	(Israel) Hapoel Tel Aviv	2–0	1–0	3–0
1999– 2000	UEFA Cup	Second round	(France) Lyon	0–1	0–1	0–2
2000–01	UEFA Cup	Qualifying round	(Luxembourg) Jeunesse Esch	7–0	4–0	11–0
2000–01	UEFA Cup	First round	(Finland) HJK Helsinki	2–0	1–2 (a.e.t.)	3–2
2000–01	UEFA Cup	Second round	(France) Bordeaux	1–2 (a.e.t.)	1–1	2–3
2001–02	UEFA Champions League	Third qualifying round	(Netherlands) Ajax	0–1	3–1	3–2
2001–02	UEFA Champions League	Group E	(Italy) Juventus	4–3	2–3	3rd
2001–02	UEFA Champions League	Group E	(Portugal) Porto	1–0	0–3	3rd
2001–02	UEFA Champions League	Group E	(Norway) Rosenborg	1–0	0–2	3rd
2001–02	UEFA Cup	Third round	(Spain) Valencia	1–0 (a.e.t.)	0–1	1–1 (4–5 p)
2002–03	UEFA Champions League	Third qualifying round	(Switzerland) Basel	3–1	0–2	3–3
2002–03	UEFA Cup	First round	(Lithuania) FK Sūduva	8–1	2–0	10–1
2002–03	UEFA Cup	Second round	(England) Blackburn Rovers	1–0	2–0	3–0
2002–03	UEFA Cup	Third round	(Spain) Celta Vigo	1–0	1–2	2–2(a)
2002–03	UEFA Cup	Fourth round	(Germany) VfB Stuttgart	3–1	2–3	5–4
2002–03	UEFA Cup	Quarter-finals	(England) Liverpool	1–1	2–0	3–1
2002–03	UEFA Cup	Semi-finals	(Portugal) Boavista	1–1	1–0	2–1
2002–03	UEFA Cup	Final	(Portugal) Porto	2–3 (a.e.t.) (Runners-up)		
2003–04	UEFA Champions League	Second qualifying round	(Lithuania) Kaunas	1–0	4–0	5–0
2003–04	UEFA Champions League	Third qualifying round	(Hungary) MTK Hungária	1–0	4–0	5–0
2003–04	UEFA Champions League	Group A	(Germany) Bayern Munich	0–0	1–2	3rd
2003–04	UEFA Champions League	Group A	(France) Lyon	2–0	2–3	3rd
2003–04	UEFA Champions League	Group A	(Belgium) Anderlecht	3–1	0–1	3rd
2003–04	UEFA Cup	Third round	(Czech Republic) Teplice	3–0	0–1	3–1
2003–04	UEFA Cup	Fourth round	(Spain) Barcelona	1–0	0–0	1–0
2003–04	UEFA Cup	Quarter-finals	(Spain) Villarreal	1–1	0–2	1–3
2004–05	UEFA Champions League	Group F	(Spain) Barcelona	1–3	1–1	4th
2004–05	UEFA Champions League	Group F	(Italy) Milan	0–0	1–3	4th
2004–05	UEFA Champions League	Group F	(Ukraine) Shakhtar Donetsk	1–0	0–3	4th
2005–06	UEFA Champions League	Second qualifying round	(Slovakia) Artmedia Bratislava	4–0	0–5	4–5
2006–07	UEFA Champions League	Group F	(England) Manchester United	1–0	2–3	2nd
2006–07	UEFA Champions League	Group F	(Denmark) Copenhagen	1–0	1–3	2nd
2006–07	UEFA Champions League	Group F	(Portugal) Benfica	3–0	0–3	2nd
2006–07	UEFA Champions League	Round of 16	(Italy) Milan	0–0	0–1 (a.e.t.)	0–1
2007–08	UEFA Champions League	Third qualifying round	(Russia) Spartak Moscow	1–1 (a.e.t.)	1–1	2–2 (4–3 p)
2007–08	UEFA Champions League	Group D	(Ukraine) Shakhtar Donetsk	2–1	0–2	2nd
2007–08	UEFA Champions League	Group D	(Italy) Milan	2–1	0–1	2nd
2007–08	UEFA Champions League	Group D	(Portugal) Benfica	1–0	0–1	2nd
2007–08	UEFA Champions League	Round of 16	(Spain) Barcelona	2–3	0–1	2–4
2008–09	UEFA Champions League	Group E	(Denmark) AaB	0–0	1–2	4th
2008–09	UEFA Champions League	Group E	(Spain) Villarreal	2–0	0–1	4th
2008–09	UEFA Champions League	Group E	(England) Manchester United	1–1	0–3	4th
2009–10	UEFA Champions League	Third qualifying round	(Russia) Dynamo Moscow	0–1	2–0	2–1
2009–10	UEFA Champions League	Play-off round	(England) Arsenal	0–2	1–3	1–5
2009–10	UEFA Europa League	Group C	(Israel) Hapoel Tel Aviv	2–0	1–2	3rd
2009–10	UEFA Europa League	Group C	(Austria) Rapid Wien	1–1	3–3	3rd
2009–10	UEFA Europa League	Group C	(Germany) Hamburger SV	0–1	0–0	3rd
2010–11	UEFA Champions League	Third qualifying round	(Portugal) Braga	2–1	0–3	2–4
2010–11	UEFA Europa League	Play-off	(Netherlands) Utrecht	2–0	0–4	2–4
2011–12	UEFA Europa League	Play-off	(Switzerland) Sion	3–0^{[C]}	3–0^{[C]}	6–0^{[C]}
2011–12	UEFA Europa League	Group I	(Spain) Atlético Madrid	0–1	0–2	3rd
2011–12	UEFA Europa League	Group I	(Italy) Udinese	1–1	1–1	3rd
2011–12	UEFA Europa League	Group I	(France) Rennes	3–1	1–1	3rd
2012–13	UEFA Champions League	Third Qualifying Round	(Finland) HJK Helsinki	2–1	2–0	4–1
2012–13	UEFA Champions League	Play-off round	(Sweden) Helsingborgs IF	2–0	2–0	4–0
2012–13	UEFA Champions League	Group G	(Portugal) Benfica	0–0	1–2	2nd
2012–13	UEFA Champions League	Group G	(Russia) Spartak Moscow	2–1	3–2	2nd
2012–13	UEFA Champions League	Group G	(Spain) Barcelona	2–1	1–2	2nd
2012–13	UEFA Champions League	Round of 16	(Italy) Juventus	0–3	0–2	0–5
2013–14	UEFA Champions League	Second qualifying round	(Northern Ireland) Cliftonville	2–0	3–0	5–0
2013–14	UEFA Champions League	Third qualifying round	(Sweden) IF Elfsborg	1–0	0–0	1–0
2013–14	UEFA Champions League	Play-off round	(Kazakhstan) Shakhter Karagandy	3–0	0–2	3–2
2013–14	UEFA Champions League	Group H	(Spain) Barcelona	0–1	1–6	4th
2013–14	UEFA Champions League	Group H	(Italy) Milan	0–3	0–2	4th
2013–14	UEFA Champions League	Group H	(Netherlands) Ajax	2–1	0–1	4th
2014–15	UEFA Champions League	Second qualifying round	(Iceland) KR Reykjavík	4–0	1–0	5–0
2014–15	UEFA Champions League	Third qualifying round	(Poland) Legia Warsaw	3–0^{[D]}	1–4	4–4 (a)
2014–15	UEFA Champions League	Play-off round	(Slovenia) Maribor	0–1	1–1	1–2
2014–15	UEFA Europa League	Group D	(Austria) Red Bull Salzburg	1–3	2–2	2nd
2014–15	UEFA Europa League	Group D	(Croatia) Dinamo Zagreb	1–0	3–4	2nd
2014–15	UEFA Europa League	Group D	(Romania) Astra Giurgiu	2–1	1–1	2nd
2014–15	UEFA Europa League	Round of 32	(Italy) Inter Milan	3–3	0–1	3–4
2015–16	UEFA Champions League	Second qualifying round	(Iceland) Stjarnan	2–0	4–1	6–1
2015–16	UEFA Champions League	Third qualifying round	(Azerbaijan) Qarabağ	1–0	0–0	1–0
2015–16	UEFA Champions League	Play-off round	(Sweden) Malmö FF	3–2	0–2	3–4
2015–16	UEFA Europa League	Group A	(Netherlands) Ajax	1–2	2–2	4th
2015–16	UEFA Europa League	Group A	(Turkey) Fenerbahçe	2–2	1–1	4th
2015–16	UEFA Europa League	Group A	(Norway) Molde	1–2	1–3	4th
2016–17	UEFA Champions League	Second qualifying round	(Gibraltar) Lincoln Red Imps	3–0	0–1	3–1
2016–17	UEFA Champions League	Third qualifying round	(Kazakhstan) Astana	2–1	1–1	3–2
2016–17	UEFA Champions League	Play-off round	(Israel) Hapoel Be'er Sheva	5–2	0–2	5–4
2016–17	UEFA Champions League	Group C	(Spain) Barcelona	0–2	0–7	4th
2016–17	UEFA Champions League	Group C	(England) Manchester City	3–3	1–1	4th
2016–17	UEFA Champions League	Group C	(Germany) Borussia Mönchengladbach	0–2	1–1	4th
2017–18	UEFA Champions League	Second qualifying round	(Northern Ireland) Linfield	4–0	2–0	6–0
2017–18	UEFA Champions League	Third qualifying round	(Norway) Rosenborg	0–0	1–0	1–0
2017–18	UEFA Champions League	Play-off round	(Kazakhstan) Astana	5–0	3–4	8–4
2017–18	UEFA Champions League	Group B	(France) Paris Saint-Germain	0–5	1–7	3rd
2017–18	UEFA Champions League	Group B	(Germany) Bayern Munich	1–2	0–3	3rd
2017–18	UEFA Champions League	Group B	(Belgium) Anderlecht	0–1	3–0	3rd
2017–18	UEFA Europa League	Round of 32	(Russia) Zenit Saint Petersburg	1–0	0–3	1–3
2018–19	UEFA Champions League	First qualifying round	(Armenia) FC Alashkert	3–0	3–0	6–0
2018–19	UEFA Champions League	Second qualifying round	(Norway) Rosenborg	3–1	0–0	3–1
2018–19	UEFA Champions League	Third qualifying round	(Greece) AEK Athens	1–1	1–2	2–3
2018–19	UEFA Europa League	Play-off round	(Lithuania) FK Sūduva	3–0	1–1	4–1
2018–19	UEFA Europa League	Group B	(Austria) Red Bull Salzburg	1–2	1–3	2nd
2018–19	UEFA Europa League	Group B	(Germany) RB Leipzig	2–1	0–2	2nd
2018–19	UEFA Europa League	Group B	(Norway) Rosenborg	1–0	1–0	2nd
2018–19	UEFA Europa League	Round of 32	(Spain) Valencia	0–2	0–1	0–3
2019–20	UEFA Champions League	First qualifying round	(Bosnia and Herzegovina) Sarajevo	2–1	3–1	5–2
2019–20	UEFA Champions League	Second qualifying round	(Estonia) Nõmme Kalju	5–0	2−0	7−0
2019–20	UEFA Champions League	Third qualifying round	(Romania) CFR Cluj	3−4	1−1	4−5
2019–20	UEFA Europa League	Play-off round	(Sweden) AIK	2−0	4−1	6−1
2019–20	UEFA Europa League	Group E	(Italy) Lazio	2–1	2−1	1st
2019–20	UEFA Europa League	Group E	(France) Rennes	3−1	1–1	1st
2019–20	UEFA Europa League	Group E	(Romania) CFR Cluj	2−0	0−2	1st
2019–20	UEFA Europa League	Round of 32	(Denmark) Copenhagen	1−3	1−1	2−4
2020–21	UEFA Champions League	First qualifying round	(Iceland) KR	6–0	—N/a	—N/a
2020–21	UEFA Champions League	Second qualifying round	(Hungary) Ferencváros	1−2	—N/a	—N/a
2020–21	UEFA Europa League	Third qualifying round	(Latvia) Riga	—N/a	1−0	—N/a
2020–21	UEFA Europa League	Play-off round	(Bosnia and Herzegovina) Sarajevo	—N/a	1−0	—N/a
2020–21	UEFA Europa League	Group H	(Czech Republic) Sparta Prague	1–4	1–4	4th
2020–21	UEFA Europa League	Group H	(Italy) Milan	1–3	2–4	4th
2020–21	UEFA Europa League	Group H	(France) Lille	3–2	2−2	4th
2021–22	UEFA Champions League	Second qualifying round	(Denmark) Midtjylland	1–1	1–2 (a.e.t.)	2–3
2021–22	UEFA Europa League	Third qualifying round	(Czech Republic) Jablonec	3−0	4–2	7−2
2021–22	UEFA Europa League	Play-off round	(Netherlands) AZ	2–0	1–2	3–2
2021–22	UEFA Europa League	Group G	(Germany) Bayer Leverkusen	0–4	2–3	3rd
2021–22	UEFA Europa League	Group G	(Spain) Real Betis	3–2	3–4	3rd
2021–22	UEFA Europa League	Group G	(Hungary) Ferencváros	2–0	3–2	3rd
2021–22	UEFA Europa Conference League	Knockout round play-offs	(Norway) Bodø/Glimt	1–3	0–2	1–5
2022–23	UEFA Champions League	Group F	(Spain) Real Madrid	0–3	1–5	4th
2022–23	UEFA Champions League	Group F	(Germany) RB Leipzig	0–2	1–3	4th
2022–23	UEFA Champions League	Group F	(Ukraine) Shakhtar Donetsk	1–1	1–1	4th
2023–24	UEFA Champions League	Group E	(Netherlands) Feyenoord	2–1	0–2	4th
2023–24	UEFA Champions League	Group E	(Italy) Lazio	1–2	0–2	4th
2023–24	UEFA Champions League	Group E	(Spain) Atlético Madrid	2–2	0–6	4th
2024–25	UEFA Champions League	League phase	(Slovakia) Slovan Bratislava	5–1	—N/a	21st
2024–25	UEFA Champions League	League phase	(Germany) Borussia Dortmund	—N/a	1–7	21st
2024–25	UEFA Champions League	League phase	(Italy) Atalanta	—N/a	0–0	21st
2024–25	UEFA Champions League	League phase	(Germany) RB Leipzig	3–1	—N/a	21st
2024–25	UEFA Champions League	League phase	(Belgium) Club Brugge	1–1	—N/a	21st
2024–25	UEFA Champions League	League phase	(Croatia) Dinamo Zagreb	—N/a	0–0	21st
2024–25	UEFA Champions League	League phase	(Switzerland) Young Boys	1–0	—N/a	21st
2024–25	UEFA Champions League	League phase	(England) Aston Villa	—N/a	2–4	21st
2024–25	UEFA Champions League	Knockout phase play-offs	(Germany) Bayern Munich	1–2	1–1	2–3
2025–26	UEFA Champions League	Play-off round	(Kazakhstan) Kairat	0–0	0–0 (a.e.t.)	0–0 (2–3 p)
2025–26	UEFA Europa League	League phase	(Serbia) Red Star Belgrade	—N/a	1–1	21st
2025–26	UEFA Europa League	League phase	(Portugal) Braga	0–2	—N/a	21st
2025–26	UEFA Europa League	League phase	(Austria) Sturm Graz	2–1	—N/a	21st
2025–26	UEFA Europa League	League phase	(Denmark) Midtjylland	—N/a	1–3	21st
2025–26	UEFA Europa League	League phase	(Netherlands) Feyenoord	—N/a	3–1	21st
2025–26	UEFA Europa League	League phase	(Italy) Roma	0–3	—N/a	21st
2025–26	UEFA Europa League	League phase	(Italy) Bologna	—N/a	2–2	21st
2025–26	UEFA Europa League	League phase	(Netherlands) Utrecht	4–2	—N/a	21st
2025–26	UEFA Europa League	Knockout phase play-offs	(Germany) VfB Stuttgart	1–4	1–0	2–4
2026–27	UEFA Champions League	Play-off round	(Austria) LASK	3–0	1–5 (a.e.t.)	4–5
2026–27	UEFA Europa League	League phase	(Hungary) Ferencváros	1–3	—N/a	
2026–27	UEFA Europa League	League phase	(Portugal) Benfica	—N/a	1–4	
2026–27	UEFA Europa League	League phase	(Spain) Celta Vigo	1–2	—N/a	
2026–27	UEFA Europa League	League phase	(Turkey) Beşiktaş	3–2	—N/a	
2026–27	UEFA Europa League	League phase	(Portugal) Torreense	—N/a		
2026–27	UEFA Europa League	League phase	(Cyprus) Omonia	—N/a		
2026–27	UEFA Europa League	League phase	(France) Marseille		—N/a	
2026–27	UEFA Europa League	League phase	(Belgium) Union Saint-Gilloise	—N/a		

Notes

A The tie finished level on aggregate after both sides won their home games 3–0. Celtic won the tie on the toss of a coin.

B The home leg was initially won 3–0 by Celtic, but UEFA ordered a replay to take place at a neutral ground. The replayed match was held at Old Trafford, Manchester, with Celtic losing 0–1.

C Sion were disqualified for fielding ineligible players in both legs resulting two automatic 3–0 wins.

D UEFA awarded Celtic a 3–0 win due to Legia Warsaw fielding suspended player Bartosz Bereszyński in the second leg. The original match had ended in a 2–0 win for Legia Warsaw.

=== Season summary ===
Competition	'63	'64	'65	'66	'67	'68	'69	'70	'71	'72	'73	'74	'75	'76	'77	'78	'79	'80	'81	'82	'83	'84	'85	'86	'87	'88	'89	'90	'91	'92	'93	'94	'95	'96	'97	'98	'99	'00	'01	'02	'03	'04	'05	'06	'07	'08	'09	'10	'11	'12	'13	'14	'15	'16	'17	'18	'19	'20	'21	'22	'23	'24	'25	'26	'27	Total
European Cup / Champions League	•	•	•	•	W	R1	QF	RU	QF	SF	R2	SF	R1	•	•	R2	•	QF	•	R1	R2	•	•	•	R2	•	R2	•	•	•	•	•	•	•	•	•	Q2	•	•	GS	Q3	GS	GS	Q2	R16	R16	GS	PO	Q3	•	R16	GS	PO	PO	GS	GS	Q3	Q3	Q2	Q2	GS	GS	KPO	PO	PO	41
UEFA Cup Winners' Cup	•	SF	•	SF	•	•	•	•	•	•	•	•	•	QF	•	•	•	•	R1	•	•	•	R2	R1	•	•	•	R1	•	•	•	•	•	R2	•	•	•	•	•	•	•	•	•	•	•	•	•	•	•	•	•	•	•	•	•	•	•	•	•	•	•	•	•	•	•	8
UEFA Cup / Europa League	•	•	•	•	•	•	•	•	•	•	•	•	•	•	R1	•	•	•	•	•	•	R3	•	•	•	R1	•	•	•	R2	R2	R2	•	•	R1	R1	R2	R2	R2	R3	RU	QF	•	•	•	•	•	GS	PO	GS	•	•	R32	GS	•	R32	R32	R32	GS	GS	•	•	•	KPO	LP	26
UEFA Europa Conference League	•	•	•	•	•	•	•	•	•	•	•	•	•	•	•	•	•	•	•	•	•	•	•	•	•	•	•	•	•	•	•	•	•	•	•	•	•	•	•	•	•	•	•	•	•	•	•	•	•	•	•	•	•	•	•	•	•	•	•	KPO	•	•	•	•	•	1
Inter-Cities Fairs Cup	R1	•	R2	•	•	•	•	•	•	•	•	•	•	•	•	•	•	•	•	•	•	•	•	•	•	•	•	•	•	•	•	•	•	•	•	•	•	•	•	•	•	•	•	•	•	•	•	•	•	•	•	•	•	•	•	•	•	•	•	•	•	•	•	•	•	2

- Club was transferred into the UEFA Cup / UEFA Europa League.
- Club was transferred into the UEFA Europa Conference League.

== Statistics by club and country ==
As of match played 17 September 2026

Country	Club	Pld	W	D	L	GF	GA	GD	W%
Albania	Partizani	2	1	0	1	4	2	+2	50.00
Albania	Subtotal	2	1	0	1	4	2	+2	50.00
Argentina	Racing Club	3	1	0	2	2	3	−1	33.33
Argentina	Subtotal	3	1	0	2	2	3	−1	33.33
Armenia	Alashkert	2	2	0	0	6	0	+6	100.00
Armenia	Subtotal	2	2	0	0	6	0	+6	100.00
Austria	LASK	2	1	0	1	4	5	−1	50.00
Austria	Rapid Wien	4	0	2	2	5	8	−3	0.00
Austria	Red Bull Salzburg	4	0	1	3	5	10	−5	0.00
Austria	Sturm Graz	1	1	0	0	2	1	+1	100.00
Austria	Wacker Innsbruck	4	2	0	2	9	9	+0	50.00
Austria	Subtotal	15	4	3	8	25	33	−8	26.67
Azerbaijan	Qarabağ	2	1	1	0	1	0	+1	50.00
Azerbaijan	Subtotal	2	1	1	0	1	0	+1	50.00
Belgium	Anderlecht	4	2	0	2	6	3	+3	50.00
Belgium	Club Brugge	1	0	1	0	1	1	+0	0.00
Belgium	Gent	2	1	0	1	3	1	+2	50.00
Belgium	Germinal Ekeren	2	1	1	0	3	1	+2	50.00
Belgium	Subtotal	9	4	2	3	13	6	+7	44.44
Bosnia and Herzegovina	Sarajevo	3	3	0	0	6	2	+4	100.00
Bosnia and Herzegovina	Subtotal	3	3	0	0	6	2	+4	100.00
Croatia	Dinamo Zagreb (Note: Including ties representing Yugoslavia)	7	3	1	3	9	9	+0	42.86
Croatia	Subtotal	7	3	1	3	9	9	+0	42.86
Czech Republic	Dukla Prague (Note: Representing Czechoslovakia)	2	1	1	0	3	1	+2	50.00
Czech Republic	Jablonec	2	2	0	0	7	2	+5	100.00
Czech Republic	Sparta Prague	2	0	0	2	2	8	−6	0.00
Czech Republic	Teplice	2	1	0	1	3	1	+2	50.00
Czech Republic	Subtotal	8	4	1	3	15	12	+3	50.00
Denmark	AaB	2	0	1	1	1	2	−1	0.00
Denmark	AGF Aarhus	4	4	0	0	8	1	+7	100.00
Denmark	Boldklubben 1903	2	1	0	1	4	2	+2	50.00
Denmark	Copenhagen	4	1	1	2	4	7	−3	25.00
Denmark	Midtjylland	3	0	1	2	3	6	−3	0.00
Denmark	Vejle	2	1	1	0	1	0	+1	50.00
Denmark	Subtotal	17	7	4	6	21	18	+3	41.18
England	Arsenal	2	0	0	2	1	5	−4	0.00
England	Aston Villa	1	0	0	1	2	4	−2	0.00
England	Blackburn Rovers	2	2	0	0	3	0	+3	100.00
England	Leeds United	2	2	0	0	3	1	+2	100.00
England	Liverpool	6	2	3	1	6	5	+1	33.33
England	Manchester City	2	0	2	0	4	4	+0	0.00
England	Manchester United	4	1	1	2	4	7	−3	25.00
England	Nottingham Forest	2	0	1	1	1	2	−1	0.00
England	Subtotal	21	7	7	7	24	28	−4	33.33
Estonia	Nõmme Kalju	2	2	0	0	7	0	+7	100.00
Estonia	Subtotal	2	2	0	0	7	0	+7	100.00
Finland	HJK	4	3	0	1	7	3	+4	75.00
Finland	KPV	2	2	0	0	14	0	+14	100.00
Finland	TPS	2	2	0	0	9	1	+8	100.00
Finland	Subtotal	8	7	0	1	30	4	+26	87.50
France	Bordeaux	2	0	1	1	2	3	−1	0.00
France	Lille	2	1	1	0	5	4	+1	50.00
France	Lyon	4	1	0	3	4	5	−1	25.00
France	Nantes	2	2	0	0	6	2	+4	100.00
France	Paris Saint-Germain	4	0	0	4	1	16	−15	0.00
France	Rennes	4	2	2	0	8	4	+4	50.00
France	Saint-Étienne	2	1	0	1	4	2	+2	50.00
France	Subtotal	20	7	4	9	30	36	−6	35.00
(Georgia (country)) Georgia	Dinamo Batumi	2	2	0	0	7	2	+5	100.00
(Georgia (country)) Georgia	Subtotal	2	2	0	0	7	2	+5	100.00
Germany	1. FC Köln	2	1	0	1	3	2	+1	50.00
Germany	Bayer Leverkusen	2	0	0	2	2	7	−5	0.00
Germany	Bayern Munich	5	0	1	4	3	9	−6	0.00
Germany	Borussia Dortmund	6	1	1	4	5	14	−9	16.67
Germany	Borussia Mönchengladbach	2	0	1	1	1	3	−2	0.00
Germany	Hamburger SV	4	0	1	3	0	5	−5	0.00
Germany	RB Leipzig	5	2	0	3	6	9	−3	40.00
Germany	VfB Stuttgart	4	2	0	2	7	7	+0	50.00
Germany	Werder Bremen	2	0	1	1	0	1	−1	0.00
Germany	Zwickau (Note: Representing East Germany)	2	0	1	1	1	2	−1	0.00
Germany	Subtotal	34	6	6	22	28	59	−31	17.65
Gibraltar	Lincoln Red Imps	2	1	0	1	3	1	+2	50.00
Gibraltar	Subtotal	2	1	0	1	3	1	+2	50.00
Greece	Olympiacos	2	0	1	1	1	3	−2	0.00
Greece	AEK Athens	2	0	1	1	2	3	−1	0.00
Greece	Subtotal	4	0	2	2	3	6	−3	0.00
Hungary	Diósgyőri	2	1	0	1	7	2	+5	50.00
Hungary	Honvéd	2	1	0	1	4	1	+3	50.00
Hungary	Ferencváros	4	2	0	2	7	7	+0	50.00
Hungary	MTK Budapest	4	3	0	1	8	4	+4	75.00
Hungary	Újpest	4	2	1	1	5	6	−1	50.00
Hungary	Subtotal	16	9	1	6	31	20	+11	56.25
Iceland	KR Reykjavík	3	3	0	0	11	0	+11	100.00
Iceland	Stjarnan	2	2	0	0	6	1	+5	100.00
Iceland	Valur	2	2	0	0	9	0	+9	100.00
Iceland	Subtotal	7	7	0	0	26	1	+25	100.00
(Republic of Ireland) Ireland	Dundalk	2	1	1	0	3	2	+1	50.00
(Republic of Ireland) Ireland	Shamrock Rovers	2	2	0	0	3	0	+3	100.00
(Republic of Ireland) Ireland	St Patrick's Athletic	2	1	1	0	2	0	+2	50.00
(Republic of Ireland) Ireland	Waterford	2	2	0	0	10	2	+8	100.00
(Republic of Ireland) Ireland	Subtotal	8	6	2	0	18	4	+14	75.00
Israel	Hapoel Be'er Sheva	2	1	0	1	5	4	+1	50.00
Israel	Hapoel Tel Aviv	4	3	0	1	6	2	+4	75.00
Israel	Subtotal	6	4	0	2	11	6	+5	66.67
Italy	Atalanta	1	0	1	0	0	0	+0	0.00
Italy	Bologna	1	0	1	0	2	2	+0	0.00
Italy	Fiorentina	2	1	0	1	3	1	+2	50.00
Italy	Inter Milan	5	1	3	1	5	5	+0	20.00
Italy	Milan	12	1	3	8	6	19	−13	8.33
Italy	Juventus	6	2	0	4	7	13	−6	33.33
Italy	Lazio	4	2	0	2	5	6	−1	50.00
Italy	Roma	1	0	0	1	0	3	−3	0.00
Italy	Udinese	2	0	2	0	2	2	+0	0.00
Italy	Subtotal	34	7	10	17	30	51	−21	20.59
Kazakhstan	Astana	4	2	1	1	11	6	+5	50.00
Kazakhstan	Kairat	2	0	2	0	0	0	+0	0.00
Kazakhstan	Shakhter Karagandy	2	1	0	1	3	2	+1	50.00
Kazakhstan	Subtotal	8	3	3	2	14	8	+6	37.50
Latvia	Riga	1	1	0	0	1	0	+1	100.00
Latvia	Subtotal	1	1	0	0	1	0	+1	100.00
Lithuania	Kaunas	2	2	0	0	5	0	+5	100.00
Lithuania	Sūduva	4	3	1	0	14	2	+12	75.00
Lithuania	Subtotal	6	5	1	0	19	2	+17	83.33
Luxembourg	Jeunesse Esch	4	4	0	0	22	1	+21	100.00
Luxembourg	Subtotal	4	4	0	0	22	1	+21	100.00
Malta	Sliema Wanderers	2	2	0	0	6	1	+5	100.00
Malta	Subtotal	2	2	0	0	6	1	+5	100.00
Netherlands	Ajax	10	4	2	4	13	14	−1	40.00
Netherlands	AZ	2	1	0	1	3	2	+1	50.00
Netherlands	Feyenoord	4	2	0	2	6	6	+0	50.00
Netherlands	Go Ahead Eagles	2	2	0	0	7	0	+7	100.00
Netherlands	Utrecht	3	2	0	1	6	6	+0	66.67
Netherlands	Subtotal	21	11	2	8	35	28	+7	52.38
Northern Ireland	Cliftonville	2	2	0	0	5	0	+5	100.00
Northern Ireland	Linfield	2	2	0	0	6	0	+6	100.00
Northern Ireland	Subtotal	4	4	0	0	11	0	+11	100.00
Norway	Bodø/Glimt	2	0	0	2	1	5	−4	0.00
Norway	Molde	2	0	0	2	2	5	−3	0.00
Norway	Rosenborg	10	7	2	1	12	5	+7	70.00
Norway	Subtotal	14	7	2	5	15	15	+0	50.00
Poland	Legia Warsaw	2	1	0	1	4	4	+0	50.00
Poland	Wisła Kraków	2	0	1	1	2	4	−2	0.00
Poland	Subtotal	4	1	1	2	6	8	−2	25.00
Portugal	Benfica	9	3	1	5	9	13	−4	33.33
Portugal	Boavista	4	2	2	0	5	2	+3	50.00
Portugal	Braga	3	1	0	2	2	6	−4	33.33
Portugal	Leixões	2	1	1	0	4	1	+3	50.00
Portugal	Porto	3	1	0	2	3	6	−3	33.33
Portugal	Sporting CP	4	2	0	2	6	4	+2	50.00
Portugal	Vitória de Guimarães	2	2	0	0	4	2	+2	100.00
Portugal	Subtotal	27	12	4	11	33	34	−1	44.44
Romania	Astra Giurgiu	2	1	1	0	3	2	+1	50.00
Romania	CFR Cluj	4	1	1	2	6	7	−1	25.00
Romania	Poli Timișoara	2	1	0	1	2	2	+0	50.00
Romania	Subtotal	8	3	2	3	11	11	+0	37.50
Russia	Dynamo Moscow	2	1	0	1	2	1	+1	50.00
Russia	Spartak Moscow	4	2	2	0	7	5	+2	50.00
Russia	Zenit Saint Petersburg	2	1	0	1	1	3	−2	50.00
Russia	Subtotal	8	4	2	2	10	9	+1	50.00
Serbia	Partizan (Note: Representing Yugoslavia)	2	1	0	1	6	6	+0	50.00
Serbia	Red Star Belgrade (Note: Including ties representing Yugoslavia)	3	1	2	0	7	3	+4	33.33
Serbia	Vojvodina (Note: Representing Yugoslavia)	2	1	0	1	2	1	+1	50.00
Serbia	Subtotal	7	3	2	2	15	10	+5	42.86
Slovakia	Artmedia Bratislava	2	1	0	1	4	5	−1	50.00
Slovakia	Košice	2	1	1	0	1	0	+1	50.00
Slovakia	Slovan Bratislava (Note: Including ties representing Czechoslovakia)	3	3	0	0	7	1	+6	100.00
Slovakia	Subtotal	7	5	1	1	12	6	+6	71.43
Slovenia	Maribor	2	0	1	1	1	2	−1	0.00
Slovenia	Subtotal	2	0	1	1	1	2	−1	0.00
Spain	Atlético Madrid	8	0	3	5	4	16	−12	0.00
Spain	Barcelona	14	2	3	9	10	30	−20	14.29
Spain	Celta Vigo	3	1	0	2	3	4	−1	33.33
Spain	Real Betis	2	1	0	1	6	6	+0	50.00
Spain	Real Madrid	4	1	0	3	3	11	−8	25.00
Spain	Real Sociedad	2	1	0	1	2	3	−1	50.00
Spain	Valencia	6	1	1	4	5	10	−5	16.67
Spain	Villarreal	4	1	1	2	3	4	−1	25.00
Spain	Subtotal	42	8	8	26	35	82	−47	19.05
Sweden	AIK	2	2	0	0	6	1	+5	100.00
Sweden	IF Elfsborg	2	1	1	0	1	0	+1	50.00
Sweden	Helsingborgs IF	2	2	0	0	4	0	+4	100.00
Sweden	Malmö FF	2	1	0	1	3	4	−1	50.00
Sweden	Subtotal	8	6	1	1	14	5	+9	75.00
Switzerland	Basel	8	5	1	2	21	9	+12	62.50
Switzerland	Neuchâtel Xamax	2	1	0	1	2	5	−3	50.00
Switzerland	Sion	2	2	0	0	6	0	+6	100.00
Switzerland	Young Boys	3	2	1	0	2	0	+2	66.67
Switzerland	Zürich	4	2	1	1	8	5	+3	50.00
Switzerland	Subtotal	19	12	3	4	39	19	+20	63.16
Turkey	Fenerbahçe	2	0	2	0	3	3	+0	0.00
Turkey	Beşiktaş	1	1	0	0	3	2	+1	100.00
Subtotal	3	1	2	0	6	5	+1	33.33	
Ukraine	Dynamo Kyiv (Note: Representing Soviet Union)	6	1	3	2	8	8	+0	16.67
Ukraine	Shakhtar Donetsk	6	2	2	2	5	8	−3	33.33
Ukraine	Subtotal	12	3	5	4	13	16	−3	25.00
Wales	Cwmbrân Town	2	2	0	0	10	0	+10	100.00
Wales	Inter CableTel	2	2	0	0	8	0	+8	100.00
Wales	Subtotal	4	4	0	0	18	0	+18	100.00
Total		440	192	84	164	664	554	+110	43.64

== UEFA coefficient ==
As of 6 October 2025

Rank	Country	Team	Points
57	(Greece)	PAOK	38.250
58	(Hungary)	Ferencváros	37.000
59	(Scotland)	Celtic	36.000
60	(Serbia)	Red Star Belgrade	35.000
61	(France)	Rennes	35.000

== Non-UEFA competitions ==
Season	Competition	Round	Opposition	Home Leg	Away Leg	Aggregate
1914–15	Budapest Cup	Final	(England) Burnley	1–1		
1914–15	Budapest Cup	Replay	(England) Burnley	2–1 (Winners)		
1938–39	Empire Exhibition Trophy	Quarter-finals	(England) Sunderland	0–0 (a.e.t.)		
1938–39	Empire Exhibition Trophy	Replay	(England) Sunderland	3–1 (a.e.t.)		
1938–39	Empire Exhibition Trophy	Semi-finals	(Scotland) Heart of Midlothian	1–0		
1938–39	Empire Exhibition Trophy	Final	(England) Everton	1–0 (a.e.t.) (Winners)		
1952–53	Coronation Cup	Quarter-finals	(England) Arsenal	1–0		
1952–53	Coronation Cup	Semi-finals	(England) Manchester United	2–1		
1952–53	Coronation Cup	Final	(Scotland) Hibernian	2–0 (Winners)		
1960–61	Franco-Scottish Friendship Cup	Inter-league	(France) Sedan	3–3	0–3	3–6
1961–62	Franco-Scottish Friendship Cup	Inter-league	(France) Reims	Cancelled		
1978–79	Anglo-Scottish Cup	Preliminary Round	(Scotland) Clyde	2–1	1–6	8–2
1978–79	Anglo-Scottish Cup	Quarter-finals	(England) Burnley	0–1	1–2	1–3
1986–87	Dubai Champions Cup	Final	(England) Liverpool	1–1 (2–4 p)		
1988–89	Dubai Champions Cup	Final	(England) Liverpool	1–1 (4–2 p)		

== Honours ==
Inter-Continental

- Intercontinental Cup
  - Runners-up: 1967

Continental

- European Cup:
  - Winners (1): 1966–67
  - Runners-up: 1969–70
- UEFA Cup
  - Runners-up: 2002–03

Sub-continental

- Empire Exhibition Trophy
  - Winners: 1938
- Coronation Cup
  - Winners: 1953
