= 1914–15 Celtic F.C. season =

Celtic
1914–15 season
- Manager: Willie Maley
- Stadium: Celtic Park
- Scottish First Division: 1st

The 1914–15 Scottish football season was Celtic's 27th season of competitive football, in which they competed in the Scottish First Division. They retained their League title as they ended up with 65 points, four ahead of runners-up Hearts.

The Scottish Cup, which Celtic held as champions, was not played this season because of World War I.

Celtic won the Glasgow Merchants' Charity Cup for the fourth year in a row.

The season was capped up with a charity fundraising match against a Scottish League XI made of players from the rest of the league at Hampden Park, which Celtic won 1-0.

== Competitions ==
=== Scottish First Division ===
==== League table ====
Pos	Team	Pld	W	D	L	GF	GA	GD	Pts
1	Celtic (C)	38	30	5	3	91	25	+66	65
2	Heart of Midlothian	38	27	7	4	83	32	+51	61
3	Rangers	38	23	4	11	74	47	+27	50
4	Morton	38	18	12	8	74	48	+26	48
5	Ayr United	38	20	8	10	55	40	+15	48

(C) Champions

==== Matches ====
15 August 1914 First Division	Hearts	2–0	Celtic	Glasgow
				Stadium: Celtic Park; Attendance: 18,500

22 August 1914 First Division	Celtic	1–0	Motherwell	Glasgow
				Stadium: Celtic Park; Attendance: 20,000

29 August 1914 First Division	St Mirren	3–3	Celtic	Paisley
				Stadium: St Mirren Park, Love Street; Attendance: 14,000

5 September 1914 First Division	Celtic	6–2	Morton	Glasgow
				Stadium: Celtic Park; Attendance: 12,000

19 September 1914 First Division	Hibernian	1–1	Celtic	Edinburgh
				Stadium: Easter Road; Attendance: 14,000

26 September 1914 First Division	Dundee	1–3	Celtic	Dundee
				Stadium: Dens Park; Attendance: 12,000

28 September 1914 First Division	Celtic	3–0	Clyde	Glasgow
				Stadium: Celtic Park; Attendance: 12,000

3 October 1914 First Division	Celtic	6–0	Dundee	Glasgow
				Stadium: Celtic Park; Attendance: 15,000

5 October 1914 First Division	Raith Rovers	2–2	Celtic	Kirkcaldy
				Stadium: Stark's Park; Attendance: 7,000

10 October 1914 First Division	Ayr United	1–0	Celtic	Ayr
				Stadium: Somerset Park; Attendance: 9,000

17 October 1914 First Division	Celtic	1–0	Falkirk	Glasgow
				Stadium: Celtic Park; Attendance: 15,000

24 October 1914 First Division	Hamilton Academical	0–1	Celtic	Hamilton
				Stadium: Douglas Park; Attendance: 12,000

31 October 1914 First Division	Celtic	2–1	Rangers	Glasgow
				Stadium: Celtic Park; Attendance: 33,840

7 November 1914 First Division	Kilmarnock	1–3	Celtic	Kilmarnock
				Stadium: Rugby Park; Attendance: 6,200

14 November 1914 First Division	Celtic	1–0	Third Lanark	Glasgow
				Stadium: Celtic Park; Attendance: 7,000

21 November 1914 First Division	Celtic	4–0	Ayr United	Glasgow
				Stadium: Celtic Park; Attendance: 6,000

28 November 1914 First Division	Dumbarton	1–4	Celtic	Dumbarton
				Stadium: Boghead Park; Attendance: 4,000

5 December 1914 First Division	Aberdeen	0–1	Celtic	Aberdeen
				Stadium: Pittodrie Park; Attendance: 7,000

12 December 1914 First Division	Celtic	5–1	Queen's Park	Glasgow
				Stadium: Celtic Park; Attendance: 6,000

19 December 1914 First Division	Airdrieonians	0–1	Celtic	Airdrie
				Stadium: Broomfield Park; Attendance: 7,000

26 December 1914 First Division	Celtic	3–1	Hamilton Academical	Glasgow
				Stadium: Celtic Park; Attendance: 8,000

1 January 1915 First Division	Rangers	2–1	Celtic	Glasgow
				Stadium: Ibrox Park; Attendance: 50,000

2 January 1915 First Division	Clyde	0–2	Celtic	Glasgow
				Stadium: Shawfield Stadium; Attendance: 6,000

4 January 1915 First Division	Celtic	2–0	Kilmarnock	Glasgow
				Stadium: Celtic Park; Attendance: 8,000

9 January 1915 First Division	Celtic	6–1	Partick Thistle	Glasgow
				Stadium: Celtic Park; Attendance: 11,000

16 January 1915 First Division	Falkirk	0–1	Celtic	Falkirk
				Stadium: Brockville Park; Attendance: 7,000

30 January 1915 First Division	Celtic	1–1	Hearts	Glasgow
				Stadium: Celtic Park; Attendance: 45,000

6 February 1915 First Division	Celtic	2–1	St Mirren	Glasgow
				Stadium: Celtic Park; Attendance: 10,000

13 February 1915 First Division	Morton	0–2	Celtic	Greenock
				Stadium: Cappielow Park; Attendance: 10,000

20 February 1915 First Division	Celtic	1–0	Dumbarton	Glasgow
				Stadium: Celtic Park; Attendance: 7,000

27 February 1915 First Division	Partick Thistle	0–2	Celtic	Glasgow
				Stadium: Firhill Park; Attendance: 30,000

6 March 1915 First Division	Celtic	5–1	Hibernian	Glasgow
				Stadium: Celtic Park; Attendance: 13,000

27 March 1915 First Division	Celtic	3–1	Raith Rovers	Glasgow
				Stadium: Celtic Park; Attendance: 6,000

3 April 1915 First Division	Celtic	3–0	Airdrieonians	Glasgow
				Stadium: Celtic Park; Attendance: 8,000

5 April 1915 First Division	Queen's Park	0–3	Celtic	Glasgow
				Stadium: Hampden Park; Attendance: 15,000

10 April 1915 First Division	Celtic	1–0	Aberdeen	Glasgow
				Stadium: Celtic Park; Attendance: 20,000

17 April 1915 First Division	Third Lanark	0–4	Celtic	Glasgow
				Stadium: Cathkin Park; Attendance: 12,000

24 April 1915 First Division	Motherwell	1–1	Celtic	Motherwell
				Stadium: Fir Park; Attendance: 12,000

=== Friendly ===
16 May 1915	Scottish League XI	0–1	Celtic	Glasgow
			Jimmy McColl	Stadium: Hampden Park; Referee: T. Dougray

- Charity fundraising match between the Scottish League winners and the 'Rest of the League'.

== See also ==
- Navy and Army War Fund Shield
