= 1964–65 Celtic F.C. season =

Celtic
1964–65 season
- Manager: Jimmy McGrory (to March); Jock Stein (from March)
- Stadium: Celtic Park
- Scottish Division One: 8th
- Scottish Cup: Winners
- Scottish League Cup: Finalists
- Inter-Cities Fairs Cup: Second round

During the 1964–65 Scottish football season, Celtic competed in Scottish Division One.

== Competitions ==
=== Scottish Division One ===
==== League table ====
Pos	Team	Pld	W	D	L	GF	GA	GAv	Pts
6	Dundee	34	15	10	9	86	63	1.365	40
7	Clyde	34	17	6	11	64	58	1.103	40
8	Celtic	34	16	5	13	76	57	1.333	37
9	Dundee United	34	15	6	13	59	51	1.157	36
10	Morton	34	13	7	14	54	54	1.000	33

Source: RSSSF

==== Matches ====
19 August 1964 Division One	Motherwell	1–3	Celtic	Motherwell
15:00				Stadium: Fir Park; Attendance: 15,920

5 September 1964 Division One	Celtic	3–1	Rangers	Glasgow
15:00				Stadium: Celtic Park; Attendance: 56,333

12 September 1964 Division One	Clyde	1–1	Celtic	Glasgow
15:00				Stadium: Shawfield Stadium; Attendance: 21,177

19 September 1964 Division One	Celtic	1–1	Dundee United	Glasgow
15:00 GMT				Stadium: Celtic Park; Attendance: 24,267

26 September 1964 Division One	Hearts	4–2	Celtic	Edinburgh
15:00 BST				Stadium: Tynecastle Park; Attendance: 24,774

10 October 1964 Division One	Aberdeen	1–3	Celtic	Aberdeen
15:00 BST				Stadium: Pittodrie Park; Attendance: 12,715

12 October 1964 Division One	Celtic	1–0	Morton	Glasgow
15:00 BST				Stadium: Celtic Park; Attendance: 27,833

17 October 1964 Division One	Celtic	4–1	St Mirren	Glasgow
15:00 BST				Stadium: Celtic Park; Attendance: 22,315

28 October 1964 Division One	Kilmarnock	5–2	Celtic	Kilmarnock
15:00 BST				Stadium: Rugby Park; Attendance: 19,122

31 October 1964 Division One	Celtic	2–1	Airdrieonians	Glasgow
15:00 BST				Stadium: Celtic Park; Attendance: 10,567

7 November 1964 Division One	St Johnstone	3–0	Celtic	Perth
15:00 GMT				Stadium: Muirton Park; Attendance: 10,619

14 November 1964 Division One	Celtic	0–2	Dundee	Glasgow
15:00 GMT				Stadium: Celtic Park; Attendance: 13,578

21 November 1964 Division One	Celtic	3–0	Falkirk	Glasgow
15:00 GMT				Stadium: Celtic Park; Attendance: 14,137

28 November 1964 Division One	Third Lanark	0–3	Celtic	Glasgow
15:00 GMT				Stadium: Cathkin Park; Attendance: 10,939

12 December 1964 Division One	Partick Thistle	2–4	Celtic	Glasgow
15:00 GMT				Stadium: Firhill Park; Attendance: 12,485

19 December 1964 Division One	Celtic	1–2	Dunfermline Athletic	Glasgow
15:00 GMT				Stadium: Celtic Park; Attendance: 12,416

26 December 1964 Division One	Celtic	2–0	Motherwell	Glasgow
15:00 GMT				Stadium: Celtic Park; Attendance: 8,179

1 January 1965 Division One	Rangers	1–0	Celtic	Glasgow
15:00 GMT				Stadium: Ibrox Park; Attendance: 64,274

2 January 1965 Division One	Celtic	1–1	Clyde	Glasgow
15:00 GMT				Stadium: Celtic Park; Attendance: 12,045

9 January 1965 Division One	Dundee United	3–1	Celtic	Dundee
15:00 GMT				Stadium: Tannadice Park; Attendance: 13,991

16 January 1965 Division One	Celtic	1–2	Heart of Midlothian	Glasgow
15:00 GMT				Stadium: Celtic Park; Attendance: 19,800

23 January 1965 Division One	Morton	3–3	Celtic	Greenock
15:00 GMT				Stadium: Cappielow Park; Attendance: 16,302

30 January 1965 Division One	Celtic	8–0	Aberdeen	Glasgow
15:00 GMT				Stadium: Celtic Park; Attendance: 11,9760

13 February 1965 Division One	St Mirren	1–5	Celtic	Paisley
15:00 GMT				Stadium: St Mirren Park, Love Street; Attendance: 9,507

27 February 1965 Division One	Celtic	2–0	Kilmarnock	Glasgow
15:00 GMT				Stadium: Celtic Park; Attendance: 21,875

10 March 1965 Division One	Airdrieonians	0–6	Celtic	Airdrie
19:30 GMT				Stadium: Broomfield Park; Attendance: 7,978

13 March 1965 Division One	Celtic	0–1	St Johnstone	Glasgow
15:00 GMT				Stadium: Celtic Park; Attendance: 15,916

20 March 1965 Division One	Dundee	3–3	Celtic	Dundee
15:00 GMT				Stadium: Dens Park; Attendance: 16,935

22 March 1965 Division One	Celtic	2–4	Hibernian	Glasgow
15:00 BST				Stadium: Celtic Park; Attendance: 18,103

3 April 1965 Division One	Celtic	1–0	Third Lanark	Glasgow
15:00 GMT				Stadium: Celtic Park; Attendance: 10,554

7 April 1965 Division One	Hibernian	0–4	Celtic	Edinburgh
19:30 BST				Stadium: Easter Road; Attendance: 15,893

14 April 1965 Division One	Falkirk	6–2	Celtic	Falkirk
19:30 BST				Stadium: Brockville Park; Attendance: 3,356

17 April 1965 Division One	Celtic	1–2	Partick Thistle	Glasgow
15:00 BST				Stadium: Celtic Park; Attendance: 10,635

28 April 1965 Division One	Dunfermline Athletic	5–1	Celtic	Dunfermline
19:30 BST				Stadium: East End Park; Attendance: 6,488

=== Scottish Cup ===
6 February 1965 First round	St Mirren	0–3	Celtic	Paisley
15:00 GMT				Stadium: St Mirren Park, Love Street; Attendance: 28,300

20 February 1965 Second round	Queen's Park	0–1	Celtic	Glasgow
15:00 GMT				Stadium: Hampden Park; Attendance: 27,443

6 March 1965 Third round	Celtic	3–2	Kilmarnock	Glasgow
15:00 GMT				Stadium: Celtic Park; Attendance: 47,000

27 March 1965 Semi-final	Celtic	2–2	Motherwell	Glasgow
15:00 GMT				Stadium: Hampden Park; Attendance: 52,013

31 March 1965 Semi-final replay	Celtic	3–0	Motherwell	Glasgow
19:30 GMT				Stadium: Hampden Park; Attendance: 58,959

24 April 1965 Final	Celtic	3–2	Dunfermline Athletic	Glasgow
15:00 GMT				Stadium: Hampden Park; Attendance: 108,800

=== Scottish League Cup ===
8 August 1964 Group 8	Celtic	0–0	Partick Thistle	Glasgow
15:00 GMT				Stadium: Celtic Park; Attendance: 29,201

12 August 1964 Group 8	Hearts	0–3	Celtic	Edinburgh
19:30 GMT				Stadium: Tynecastle Park; Attendance: 18,534

15 August 1964 Group 8	Celtic	4–1	Kilmarnock	Glasgow
15:00 GMT				Stadium: Celtic Park; Attendance: 22,017

22 August 1964 Group 8	Partick Thistle	1–5	Celtic	Glasgow
15:00 GMT				Stadium: Firhill Park; Attendance: 27,531

26 August 1964 Group 8	Celtic	6–1	Hearts	Glasgow
19:30 GMT				Stadium: Celtic Park; Attendance: 26,759

29 August 1964 Group 8	Kilmarnock	2–0	Celtic	Kilmarnock
15:00 GMT				Stadium: Rugby Park; Attendance: 18,034

9 September 1964 Quarter-final 1st leg	East Fife	2–0	Celtic	Methil
19:30 GMT				Stadium: Bayview Park; Attendance: 9,508

16 September 1964 Quarter-final 2nd leg	Celtic	6–0 (6–2 agg.)	East Fife	Glasgow
19:45 GMT				Stadium: Celtic Park; Attendance: 31,024

29 September 1964 Semi-final	Celtic	2–0	Morton	Glasgow
19:30 GMT				Stadium: Ibrox Park; Attendance: 54,818

24 October 1964 Final	Celtic	1–2	Rangers	Glasgow
15:00 GMT				Stadium: Hampden Park; Attendance: 91,423

=== Inter-Cities Fairs Cup ===
23 September 1964 1st round 1st leg	Leixoes SC (Portugal)	1–1	(Scotland) Celtic	Matosinhos
20:00 GMT				Stadium: Estádio do Mar; Attendance: 8,000

7 October 1964 1st round 2nd leg	Celtic (Scotland)	3–0 (4–1 agg.)	(Portugal) Leixoes SC	Glasgow
19:30 GMT				Stadium: Celtic Park; Attendance: 33,000

18 November 1964 2nd round 1st leg	Barcelona (Spain)	3–1	(Scotland) Celtic	Barcelona
20:00 GMT				Stadium: Nou Camp; Attendance: 21,000

2 December 1964 2nd round 2nd leg	Celtic (Scotland)	0–0 (1–3 agg.)	(Spain) Barcelona	Glasgow
19:30 GMT				Stadium: Celtic Park; Attendance: 42,500

=== Glasgow Cup ===
30 April 1965 1st round	Celtic	2–1	Rangers	Glasgow
19:30 BST				Stadium: Hampden Park; Attendance: 41,000

3 May 1965 Semi-final	Celtic	3–0	Clyde	Glasgow
19:30 BST				Stadium: Celtic Park; Attendance: 12,500

11 May 1965 Final	Queen's Park	0–5	Celtic	Glasgow
19:30 BST				Stadium: Hampden Park; Attendance: 17,051
