= 1965–66 Celtic F.C. season =

Celtic
1965–66 season
- Manager: Jock Stein
- Stadium: Celtic Park
- Scottish Division One: 1st
- Scottish Cup: Finalists
- Scottish League Cup: Winners
- European Cup Winners' Cup: Semi-finalists

During the 1965–66 Scottish football season, Celtic competed in Scottish Division One.

== Competitions ==
=== Scottish Division One ===
==== League table ====
Pos	Team	Pld	W	D	L	GF	GA	GD	Pts
1	Celtic	34	27	3	4	106	30	+76	57
2	Rangers	34	25	5	4	91	29	+62	55
3	Kilmarnock	34	20	5	9	73	46	+27	45
4	Dunfermline	34	19	6	9	94	55	+39	44
5	Dundee United	34	19	5	10	79	51	+28	43

Source: RSSSF

==== Matches ====
25 August 1965 Division One	Dundee United	0–4	Celtic	Dundee
15:00				Stadium: Tannadice Park; Attendance: 16,585

11 September 1965 Division One	Celtic	2–1	Clyde	Glasgow
15:00				Stadium: Celtic Park; Attendance: 25,046

18 September 1965 Division One	Rangers	2–1	Celtic	Glasgow
15:00				Stadium: Ibrox Park; Attendance: 76,198

25 September 1965 Division One	Celtic	7–1	Aberdeen	Glasgow
15:00 GMT				Stadium: Celtic Park; Attendance: 18,684

9 October 1965 Division One	Celtic	5–2	Hearts	Glasgow
15:00 BST				Stadium: Celtic Park; Attendance: 27,115

16 October 1965 Division One	Falkirk	3–4	Celtic	Falkirk
15:00 BST				Stadium: Brockville Park; Attendance: 10,825

27 October 1965 Division One	Dundee	1–2	Celtic	Dundee
15:00 BST				Stadium: Dens Park; Attendance: 15,551

30 October 1965 Division One	Celtic	6–1	Stirling Albion	Glasgow
15:00 BST				Stadium: Celtic Park; Attendance: 14,703

6 November 1965 Division One	Celtic	1–1	Partick Thistle	Glasgow
15:00 BST				Stadium: Celtic Park; Attendance: 24,193

13 November 1965 Division One	St Johnstone	1–4	Celtic	Perth
15:00 BST				Stadium: Muirton Park; Attendance: 10,873

20 November 1965 Division One	Celtic	5–0	Hamilton Academical	Glasgow
15:00 GMT				Stadium: Celtic Park; Attendance: 10,247

27 November 1965 Division One	Celtic	2–1	Kilmarnock	Glasgow
15:00 GMT				Stadium: Celtic Park; Attendance: 21,131

11 December 1965 Division One	Celtic	2–0	Hibernian	Glasgow
15:00 GMT				Stadium: Celtic Park; Attendance: 21,057

18 December 1965 Division One	Dunfermline Athletic	0–2	Celtic	Dunfermline
15:00 GMT				Stadium: East End Park; Attendance: 15,672

25 December 1965 Division One	Celtic	8–1	Morton	Glasgow
15:00 GMT				Stadium: Celtic Park; Attendance: 19,635

1 January 1966 Division One	Clyde	1–3	Celtic	Glasgow
15:00 GMT				Stadium: Shawfield Stadium; Attendance: 16,782

3 January 1966 Division One	Celtic	5–1	Rangers	Glasgow
15:00 GMT				Stadium: Celtic Park; Attendance: 65,445

8 January 1966 Division One	Celtic	1–0	Dundee United	Glasgow
15:00 GMT				Stadium: Celtic Park; Attendance: 33,464

15 January 1966 Division One	Aberdeen	3–1	Celtic	Aberdeen
15:00 GMT				Stadium: Pittodrie Stadium; Attendance: 18,280

22 January 1966 Division One	Celtic	1–0	Motherwell	Glasgow
15:00 GMT				Stadium: Celtic Park; Attendance: 24,539

29 January 1966 Division One	Heart of Midlothian	3–2	Celtic	Edinburgh
15:00 GMT				Stadium: Tynecastle Park; Attendance: 28,717

12 February 1966 Division One	Celtic	6–0	Falkirk	Glasgow
15:00 GMT				Stadium: Celtic Park; Attendance: 16,667

26 February 1966 Division One	Stirling Albion	1–0	Celtic	Stirling
19:30 GMT				Stadium: Annfield; Attendance: 14,070

28 February 1966 Division One	Celtic	5–0	Dundee	Glasgow
19:30 GMT				Stadium: Celtic Park; Attendance: 21,358

12 March 1966 Division One	Celtic	3–2	St Johnstone	Glasgow
15:00 GMT				Stadium: Celtic Park; Attendance: 23,293

19 March 1966 Division One	Hamilton Academical	1–7	Celtic	Hamilton
15:00 GMT				Stadium: Douglas Park; Attendance: 13,394

21 March 1966 Division One	Partick Thistle	2–2	Celtic	Glasgow
19:30 GMT				Stadium: Firhill Park; Attendance: 25,473

29 March 1966 Division One	Kilmarnock	0–2	Celtic	Kilmarnock
19:30 GMT				Stadium: Rugby Park; Attendance: 25,035

5 April 1966 Division One	St Mirren	0–3	Celtic	Paisley
19:30 GMT				Stadium: St Mirren Park, Love Street; Attendance: 12,015

9 April 1966 Division One	Celtic	5–0	St Mirren	Glasgow
15:00 BST				Stadium: Celtic Park; Attendance: 23,077

16 April 1966 Division One	Hibernian	0–0	Celtic	Edinburgh
19:30 BST				Stadium: Easter Road; Attendance: 24,030

30 April 1966 Division One	Morton	0–2	Celtic	Greenock
15:00 BST				Stadium: Cappielow Park; Attendance: 15,081

4 May 1966 Division One	Celtic	2–1	Dunfermline Athletic	Glasgow
19:30 BST				Stadium: Celtic Park; Attendance: 27,080

7 May 1966 Division One	Motherwell	0–1	Celtic	Motherwell
15:00 BST				Stadium: Fir Park; Attendance: 21,234

=== Scottish Cup ===
5 February 1966 First round	Celtic	4–0	Stranraer	Glasgow
15:00 GMT				Stadium: Celtic Park; Attendance: 15,500

23 February 1966 Second round	Dundee	0–2	Celtic	Dundee
19:30 GMT				Stadium: Dens Park; Attendance: 29,000

5 March 1966 Third round	Hearts	3–3	Celtic	Edinburgh
15:00 GMT				Stadium: Tynecastle Park; Attendance: 45,965

9 March 1966 Third round replay	Celtic	3–1	Hearts	Glasgow
19:30 GMT				Stadium: Celtic Park; Attendance: 72,100

26 March 1966 Semi-final	Celtic	2–0	Dunfermline Athletic	Glasgow
15:00 GMT				Stadium: Ibrox Park; Attendance: 53,900

23 April 1966 Final	Celtic	0–0	Rangers	Glasgow
15:00 GMT				Stadium: Hampden Park; Attendance: 126,552

27 April 1966 Final replay	Celtic	0–1	Rangers	Glasgow
19:30 GMT				Stadium: Hampden Park; Attendance: 98,202

=== Scottish League Cup ===
14 August 1965 Group 8	Dundee United	2–1	Celtic	Dundee
15:00 GMT				Stadium: Tannadice Park; Attendance: 23,503

18 August 1965 Group 8	Celtic	1–0	Motherwell	Glasgow
19:30 GMT				Stadium: Celtic Park; Attendance: 31,426

21 August 1965 Group 8	Celtic	0–2	Dundee	Glasgow
15:00 GMT				Stadium: Celtic Park; Attendance: 31,343

28 August 1965 Group 8	Celtic	3–0	Dundee United	Glasgow
15:00 GMT				Stadium: Celtic Park; Attendance: 32,382

1 September 1965 Group 8	Motherwell	2–3	Celtic	Motherwell
15:00 GMT				Stadium: Fir Park; Attendance: 21,242

4 September 1965 Group 8	Dundee	1–3	Celtic	Dundee
19:30 GMT				Stadium: Dens Park; Attendance: 22,262

15 September 1965 Quarter-final 1st leg	Raith Rovers	1–8	Celtic	Kirkcaldy
19:30 GMT				Stadium: Stark's Park; Attendance: 13,920

22 September 1965 Quarter-final 2nd leg	Celtic	4–0 (12–1 agg.)	Raith Rovers	Glasgow
19:45 GMT				Stadium: Celtic Park; Attendance: 8,296

4 October 1965 Semi-final	Celtic	2–2	Hibernian	Glasgow
19:30 GMT				Stadium: Ibrox Park; Attendance: 46,074

18 October 1965 Semi-final replay	Celtic	4–0	Hibernian	Glasgow
19:30 GMT				Stadium: Ibrox Park; Attendance: 51,023

23 October 1965 Final	Celtic	2–1	Rangers	Glasgow
15:00 GMT				Stadium: Hampden Park; Attendance: 107,647

=== European Cup Winners' Cup ===
29 September 1965 1st round 1st leg	Go Ahead Eagles (Netherlands)	0–6	(Scotland) Celtic	Deventer
20:00 GMT				Stadium: De Adelaarshorst; Attendance: 18,223

7 October 1965 1st round 2nd leg	Celtic (Scotland)	1–0 (7–0 agg.)	(Netherlands) Go Ahead Eagles	Glasgow
19:30 GMT				Stadium: Celtic Park; Attendance: 14,723

3 November 1965 2nd round 1st leg	AGF (Aarhus) (Denmark)	0–1	(Scotland) Celtic	Aarhus
20:00 GMT				Stadium: Atletion; Attendance: 10,831

17 November 1965 2nd round 2nd leg	Celtic (Scotland)	2–0 (3–0 agg.)	(Denmark) AGF (Aarhus)	Glasgow
19:30 GMT				Stadium: Celtic Park; Attendance: 23,079

12 January 1966 Quarter-final 1st leg	Celtic (Scotland)	3–0	(Soviet Union) Dinamo Kiev	Glasgow
19:30 GMT				Stadium: Celtic Park; Attendance: 64,363

26 January 1966 Quarter-final 2nd leg	Dinamo Kiev (Soviet Union)	1–1 (1–4 agg.)	(Scotland) Celtic	Kiev
19:00 GMT				Stadium: Central Stadium; Attendance: 30,516

14 April 1966 Semi-final 1st leg	Celtic (Scotland)	1–0	(England) Liverpool	Glasgow
19:30 GMT				Stadium: Celtic Park; Attendance: 76,446

19 April 1966 Semi-final 2nd leg	Liverpool (England)	2–0 (2–1 agg.)	(Scotland) Celtic	Liverpool
19:00 GMT				Stadium: Anfield; Attendance: 54,208

== See also ==
- Nine in a row
