= 1960–61 Celtic F.C. season =

Celtic
1960–61 season
- Manager: Jimmy McGrory
- Stadium: Celtic Park
- Scottish Division One: 4th
- Scottish Cup: Finalists
- Scottish League Cup: Group stage

During the 1960–61 Scottish football season, Celtic competed in Scottish Division One.

Celtic advanced to the Scottish Cup final, where they lost to Dunfermline Athletic. They also advanced to the Glasgow Cup final, where they lost to Partick Thistle.

== Competitions ==
=== Scottish Division One ===
==== League table ====
Pos	Team	Pld	W	D	L	GF	GA	GR	Pts
2	Kilmarnock	34	21	8	5	77	45	1.711	50
3	Third Lanark	34	20	2	12	100	80	1.250	42
4	Celtic	34	15	9	10	64	46	1.391	39
5	Motherwell	34	15	8	11	70	57	1.228	38
6	Aberdeen	34	14	8	12	72	72	1.000	36

Source: RSSSF

==== Matches ====
24 August 1960 Division One	Kilmarnock	2–2	Celtic	Kilmarnock
19:30 GMT				Stadium: Rugby Park; Attendance: 23,745

10 September 1960 Division One	Celtic	1–5	Rangers	Glasgow
15:00				Stadium: Celtic Park; Attendance: 43,000

17 September 1960 Division One	Third Lanark	2–0	Celtic	Glasgow
15:00				Stadium: Cathkin Park; Attendance: 19,000

24 September 1960 Division One	Celtic	0–0	Aberdeen	Glasgow
15:00 GMT				Stadium: Celtic Park; Attendance: 19,000

1 October 1960 Division One	Airdrieonians	2–0	Celtic	Airdrie
15:00 BST				Stadium: Broomfield Park; Attendance: 15,500

8 October 1960 Division One	Celtic	4–2	St Mirren	Glasgow
15:00 BST				Stadium: Celtic Park; Attendance: 32,000

15 October 1960 Division One	Hibernian	0–6	Celtic	Edinburgh
15:00 BST				Stadium: Easter Road; Attendance: 28,000

22 October 1960 Division One	Clyde	0–3	Celtic	Glasgow
15:00 BST				Stadium: Shawfield Stadium; Attendance: 23,500

29 October 1960 Division One	Celtic	2–0	Ayr United	Glasgow
15:00 BST				Stadium: Celtic Park; Attendance: 16,000

5 November 1960 Division One	Raith Rovers	2–2	Celtic	Kirkcaldy
15:00 BST				Stadium: Stark's Park; Attendance: 13,000

12 November 1960 Division One	Celtic	0–1	Partick Thistle	Glasgow
15:00 GMT				Stadium: Celtic Park; Attendance: 23,000

19 November 1960 Division One	Dunfermline Athletic	2–2	Celtic	Dunfermline
15:00 GMT				Stadium: East End Park; Attendance: 15,000

26 November 1960 Division One	St Johnstone	2–1	Celtic	Perth
15:00 GMT				Stadium: Muirton Park; Attendance: 15,600

10 December 1960 Division One	Celtic	1–1	Dundee United	Glasgow
15:00 GMT				Stadium: Celtic Park; Attendance: 15,000

17 December 1960 Division One	Hearts	2–1	Celtic	Edinburgh
15:00 GMT				Stadium: Tynecastle Park; Attendance: 24,000

24 December 1960 Division One	Celtic	1–0	Motherwell	Glasgow
15:00 GMT				Stadium: Celtic Park; Attendance: 20,500

26 December 1960 Division One	Celtic	2–1	Dundee	Glasgow
15:00 GMT				Stadium: Celtic Park; Attendance: 11,000

31 December 1960 Division One	Celtic	3–2	Kilmarnock	Glasgow
15:00 GMT				Stadium: Celtic Park; Attendance: 26,000

2 January 1961 Division One	Rangers	2–1	Celtic	Glasgow
15:00 GMT				Stadium: Ibrox Park; Attendance: 79,000

7 January 1961 Division One	Celtic	2–3	Third Lanark	Glasgow
15:00 GMT				Stadium: Celtic Park; Attendance: 22,000

14 January 1961 Division One	Aberdeen	1–3	Celtic	Aberdeen
15:00 GMT				Stadium: Pittodrie Park; Attendance: 22,000

21 January 1961 Division One	Celtic	4–0	Airdrieonians	Glasgow
15:00 GMT				Stadium: Celtic Park; Attendance: 21,000

4 February 1961 Division One	St Mirren	2–1	Celtic	Paisley
15:00 GMT				Stadium: St Mirren Park, Love Street; Attendance: 23,000

18 February 1961 Division One	Celtic	2–0	Hibernian	Glasgow
15:00 GMT				Stadium: Celtic Park; Attendance: 32,000

27 February 1961 Division One	Celtic	6–1	Clyde	Glasgow
19:30 GMT				Stadium: Celtic Park; Attendance: 10,000

4 March 1961 Division One	Ayr United	1–3	Celtic	Ayr
15:00 GMT				Stadium: Somerset Park; Attendance: 15,500

18 March 1961 Division One	Partick Thistle	1–2	Celtic	Glasgow
15:00 GMT				Stadium: Firhill Park; Attendance: 26,000

20 March 1961 Division One	Celtic	1–1	Raith Rovers	Glasgow
19:30 GMT				Stadium: Celtic Park; Attendance: 8,000

25 March 1961 Division One	Celtic	2–1	Dunfermline Athletic	Glasgow
15:00 BST				Stadium: Celtic Park; Attendance: 15,000

5 April 1961 Division One	Celtic	1–1	St Johnstone	Glasgow
19:30 GMT				Stadium: Celtic Park; Attendance: 8,000

8 April 1961 Division One	Dundee	0–1	Celtic	Dundee
15:00 BST				Stadium: Dens Park; Attendance: 17,500

10 April 1961 Division One	Dundee United	1–1	Celtic	Dundee
19:30 BST				Stadium: Tannadice Park; Attendance: 15,000

29 April 1961 Division One	Motherwell	2–2	Celtic	Motherwell
15:00 BST				Stadium: Fir Park; Attendance: 14,000

2 May 1961 Division One	Celtic	1–3	Hearts	Glasgow
19:30 BST				Stadium: Celtic Park; Attendance: 7,000

=== Scottish Cup ===
28 January 1961 First round	Falkirk	1–3	Celtic	Falkirk
15:00 GMT				Stadium: Brockville Park; Attendance: 18,500

11 February 1961 Second round	Celtic	6–0	Montrose	Glasgow
15:00 GMT				Stadium: Celtic Park; Attendance: 26,000

25 February 1961 Third round	Raith Rovers	1–4	Celtic	Kirkcaldy
15:00 GMT				Stadium: Stark's Park; Attendance: 19,359

11 March 1961 Fourth round	Celtic	1–1	Hibernian	Glasgow
15:00 GMT				Stadium: Celtic Park; Attendance: 56,000

15 March 1961 Fourth round replay	Hibernian	0–1	Celtic	Edinburgh
19:30 GMT				Stadium: Easter Road; Attendance: 39,243

1 April 1961 Semi-final	Airdrieonians	0–4	Celtic	Glasgow
15:00 GMT				Stadium: Hampden Park; Attendance: 72,612

22 April 1961 Final	Dunfermline Athletic	0–0	Celtic	Glasgow
15:00 GMT				Stadium: Hampden Park; Attendance: 113,618

26 April 1961 Final replay	Dunfermline Athletic	2–0	Celtic	Glasgow
18:15 GMT				Stadium: Hampden Park; Attendance: 87,866

=== Scottish League Cup ===
13 August 1960 Group 8	Celtic	2–0	Third Lanark	Glasgow
15:00 GMT				Stadium: Celtic Park; Attendance: 25,000

17 August 1960 Group 8	Partick Thistle	1–1	Celtic	Glasgow
19:30 GMT				Stadium: Firhill Park; Attendance: 20,000

20 August 1960 Group 8	Rangers	2–3	Celtic	Glasgow
15:00 GMT				Stadium: Ibrox Park; Attendance: 60,000

27 August 1960 Group 8	Third Lanark	1–3	Celtic	Glasgow
15:00 GMT				Stadium: Cathkin Park; Attendance: 31,000

31 August 1960 Group 8	Celtic	1–2	Partick Thistle	Glasgow
19:30 GMT				Stadium: Celtic Park; Attendance: 26,000

3 September 1960 Group 8	Celtic	1–2	Rangers	Glasgow
15:00 GMT				Stadium: Celtic Park; Attendance: 60,000

=== Anglo-Franco-Scottish Friendship Cup ===
13 August 1960 Anglo-Franco-Scottish Friendship Cup	Sedan (France)	3–0	(Scotland) Celtic	Sedan
15:00 GMT				Stadium: Stade Émile Albeau; Attendance: 3,000

18 October 1960 Anglo-Franco-Scottish Friendship Cup	Celtic (Scotland)	3–3	(France) Sedan	Glasgow
19:30 GMT				Stadium: Celtic Park; Attendance: 27,000

=== Glasgow Cup ===
15 August 1960 1st round	Celtic	4–2	Rangers	Glasgow
19:30 BST				Stadium: Celtic Park; Attendance: 50,000

29 August 1960 Semi-final	Third Lanark	0–0	Celtic	Glasgow
19:15 BST				Stadium: Cathkin Park

7 September 1960 Semi-final replay	Celtic	3–1	Third Lanark	Glasgow
19:15 BST				Stadium: Celtic Park

26 September 1960 Final	Celtic	0–2	Partick Thistle	Glasgow
15:00 BST				Stadium: Hampden Park; Attendance: 26,000
