= 1963–64 Celtic F.C. season =

Celtic
1963–64 season
- Manager: Jimmy McGrory
- Stadium: Celtic Park
- Scottish Division One: 3rd
- Scottish Cup: Fourth round
- Scottish League Cup: Group stage
- European Cup Winners' Cup: Semi-finalists

During the 1963–64 Scottish football season, Celtic competed in Scottish Division One.

== Competitions ==
=== Scottish Division One ===
==== League table ====
Pos	Team	Pld	W	D	L	GF	GA	GR	Pts
1	Rangers (C)	34	25	5	4	85	31	2.742	55
2	Kilmarnock	34	22	5	7	77	40	1.925	49
3	Celtic	34	19	9	6	89	34	2.618	47
4	Hearts	34	19	9	6	74	40	1.850	47
5	Dunfermline	34	18	9	7	64	33	1.939	45

Source: RSSSF
(C) Champions

==== Matches ====
21 August 1963 Division One	Celtic	4–0	Queen of the South	Glasgow
15:00				Stadium: Celtic Park; Attendance: 13,082

7 September 1963 Division One	Rangers	2–1	Celtic	Glasgow
15:00				Stadium: Ibrox Park; Attendance: 77,276

14 September 1963 Division One	Celtic	4–4	Third Lanark	Glasgow
15:00				Stadium: Celtic Park; Attendance: 18,528

21 September 1963 Division One	Falkirk	1–0	Celtic	Falkirk
15:00 GMT				Stadium: Brockville Park; Attendance: 10,472

28 September 1963 Division One	St Mirren	2–1	Celtic	Paisley
15:00 BST				Stadium: St Mirren Park, Love Street; Attendance: 15,422

5 October 1963 Division One	Celtic	2–2	Dunfermline Athletic	Glasgow
15:00 BST				Stadium: Celtic Park; Attendance: 15,562

12 October 1963 Division One	Celtic	3–0	Aberdeen	Glasgow
15:00 BST				Stadium: Celtic Park; Attendance: 13,984

19 October 1963 Division One	Dundee United	0–3	Celtic	Dundee
15:00 BST				Stadium: Tannadice Park; Attendance: 14,345

26 October 1963 Division One	Celtic	9–0	Airdrieonians	Glasgow
15:00 BST				Stadium: Celtic Park; Attendance: 12,224

2 November 1963 Division One	East Stirlingshire	1–5	Celtic	Glasgow
15:00 BST				Stadium: Firs Park; Attendance: 7,615

9 November 1963 Division One	Celtic	5–3	Partick Thistle	Glasgow
15:00 GMT				Stadium: Celtic Park; Attendance: 26,393

16 November 1963 Division One	Hibernian	1–1	Celtic	Edinburgh
15:00 GMT				Stadium: Easter Road; Attendance: 22,306

23 November 1963 Division One	Celtic	5–0	Kilmarnock	Glasgow
15:00 GMT				Stadium: Celtic Park; Attendance: 27,548

30 November 1963 Division One	Dundee	1–1	Celtic	Dundee
15:00 GMT				Stadium: Dens Park; Attendance: 23,569

7 December 1963 Division One	Celtic	3–1	St Johnstone	Glasgow
15:00 GMT				Stadium: Celtic Park; Attendance: 22,228

14 December 1963 Division One	Hearts	1–1	Celtic	Edinburgh
15:00 GMT				Stadium: Tynecastle Park; Attendance: 22,107

21 December 1963 Division One	Celtic	2–1	Motherwell	Glasgow
15:00 GMT				Stadium: Celtic Park; Attendance: 23,986

28 December 1963 Division One	Queen of the South	0–2	Celtic	Dumfries
15:00 GMT				Stadium: Palmerston Park; Attendance: 6,079

1 January 1964 Division One	Celtic	0–1	Rangers	Glasgow
15:00 GMT				Stadium: Celtic Park; Attendance: 65,176

2 January 1964 Division One	Third Lanark	1–1	Celtic	Glasgow
15:00 GMT				Stadium: Cathkin Park; Attendance: 14,306

4 January 1964 Division One	Celtic	7–0	Falkirk	Glasgow
15:00 GMT				Stadium: Celtic Park; Attendance: 14,637

18 January 1964 Division One	Celtic	3–0	St Mirren	Glasgow
15:00 GMT				Stadium: Celtic Park; Attendance: 19,388

1 February 1964 Division One	Dunfermline Athletic	1–0	Celtic	Dunfermline
15:00 GMT				Stadium: East End Park; Attendance: 14,952

8 February 1964 Division One	Aberdeen	0–3	Celtic	Aberdeen
15:00 GMT				Stadium: Pittodrie Park; Attendance: 17,790

19 February 1964 Division One	Celtic	1–0	Dundee United	Glasgow
19:30 GMT				Stadium: Celtic Park; Attendance: 10,009

22 February 1964 Division One	Airdrieonians	0–2	Celtic	Airdrie
15:00 GMT				Stadium: Broomfield Park; Attendance: 7,743

29 February 1964 Division One	Celtic	5–2	East Stirlingshire	Glasgow
15:00 GMT				Stadium: Celtic Park; Attendance: 14,715

11 March 1964 Division One	Partick Thistle	2–2	Celtic	Glasgow
19:30 GMT				Stadium: Firhill Park; Attendance: 9,690

14 March 1964 Division One	Celtic	5–0	Hibernian	Glasgow
15:00 BST				Stadium: Celtic Park; Attendance: 9,800

21 March 1964 Division One	Kilmarnock	4–0	Celtic	Kilmarnock
15:00 GMT				Stadium: Rugby Park; Attendance: 11,459

28 March 1964 Division One	Motherwell	0–4	Celtic	Motherwell
15:00 BST				Stadium: Fir Park; Attendance: 7,604

1 April 1964 Division One	Celtic	2–1	Dundee	Glasgow
19:30 BST				Stadium: Celtic Park; Attendance: 16,309

4 April 1964 Division One	St Johnstone	1–1	Celtic	Perth
15:00 BST				Stadium: Muirton Park; Attendance: 8,815

18 April 1964 Division One	Celtic	1–1	Hearts	Glasgow
15:00 BST				Stadium: Celtic Park; Attendance: 19,456

=== Scottish Cup ===
11 January 1964 First round	Celtic	3–0	Eyemouth United	Glasgow
15:00 GMT				Stadium: Celtic Park; Attendance: 17,000

25 January 1964 Second round	Morton	1–3	Celtic	Greenock
15:00 GMT				Stadium: Cappielow Park; Attendance: 22,000

15 February 1964 Third round	Celtic	4–1	Airdrieonians	Glasgow
15:00 GMT				Stadium: Celtic Park; Attendance: 32,000

7 March 1964 Fourth round	Rangers	2–0	Celtic	Glasgow
15:00 GMT				Stadium: Ibrox Park; Attendance: 84,724

=== Scottish League Cup ===
10 August 1963 Group 8	Celtic	0–3	Rangers	Glasgow
15:00 GMT				Stadium: Celtic Park; Attendance: 57,590

14 August 1963 Group 8	Kilmarnock	0–0	Celtic	Kilmarnock
19:30 GMT				Stadium: Rugby Park; Attendance: 20,246

17 August 1963 Group 8	Celtic	1–1	Queen of the South	Glasgow
15:00 GMT				Stadium: Celtic Park; Attendance: 17,064

24 August 1963 Group 8	Rangers	3–0	Celtic	Glasgow
15:00 GMT				Stadium: Ibrox Park; Attendance: 70,338

28 August 1963 Group 8	Celtic	2–0	Kilmarnock	Glasgow
19:30 GMT				Stadium: Celtic Park; Attendance: 11,104

31 August 1963 Group 8	Queen of the South	2–3	Celtic	Dumfries
15:00 GMT				Stadium: Palmerston Park; Attendance: 5,942

=== European Cup Winners' Cup ===
17 September 1963 1st round 1st leg	FC Basel (Switzerland)	1–5	(Scotland) Celtic	Basel
20:00 GMT				Stadium: St. Jakob Stadium; Attendance: 14,300

9 October 1963 1st round 2nd leg	Celtic (Scotland)	5–0 (10 – 1 agg.)	(Switzerland) FC Basel	Glasgow
19:30 GMT				Stadium: Celtic Park; Attendance: 7,909

4 December 1963 2nd round 1st leg	Celtic (Scotland)	3–0	(Socialist Federal Republic of Yugoslavia) Dinamo Zagreb	Glasgow
20:00 GMT				Stadium: Celtic Park; Attendance: 42,000

11 December 1963 2nd round 2nd leg	Dinamo Zagreb (Socialist Federal Republic of Yugoslavia)	2–1 (2–4 agg.)	(Scotland) Celtic	Zagreb
19:30 GMT				Stadium: Stadion Maksimir; Attendance: 6,490

26 February 1964 Quarter-final 1st leg	Celtic (Scotland)	1–0	(Czechoslovakia) Slovan Bratislava	Glasgow
20:00 GMT				Stadium: Celtic Park; Attendance: 52,000

4 March 1964 Quarter-final 2nd leg	Slovan Bratislava (Czechoslovakia)	0–1 (0–2 agg.)	(Scotland) Celtic	Bratislava
19:30 GMT				Stadium: Tehelné pole Attendance: 29,000

15 April 1964 Semi-final 1st leg	Celtic (Scotland)	3–0	(Hungary) MTK Budapest	Glasgow
20:00 GMT				Stadium: Celtic Park; Attendance: 51,000

29 April 1964 Semi-final 2nd leg	MTK Budapest (Hungary)	4–0 (4–3 agg.)	(Scotland) Celtic	Budapest
19:30 GMT				Stadium: Népstadion; Attendance: 15,000

=== Glasgow Cup ===
11 November 1963 1st round	Partick Thistle	1–1	Celtic	Glasgow
19:30 BST				Stadium: Firhill Park; Attendance: 15,000

23 December 1963 1st round replay	Celtic	2–1	Partick Thistle	Glasgow
19:30 BST				Stadium: Celtic Park; Attendance: 41,000

8 January 1964 Semi-final	Celtic	1–1	Third Lanark	Glasgow
19:30 BST				Stadium: Celtic Park; Attendance: 41,000

20 January 1964 Semi-final replay	Third Lanark	0–3	Celtic	Glasgow
19:30 BST				Stadium: Cathkin Park; Attendance: 12,000

25 March 1964 Final	Celtic	2–0	Clyde	Glasgow
19:30 BST				Stadium: Celtic Park; Attendance: 13,500
