= Ian Bennyworth =

English footballer

Personal information
- Full name: Ian Robert Bennyworth
- Date of birth: 15 January 1962
- Place of birth: Hull, England
- Height: 6 ft 0 in (1.83 m)
- Position: Central defender

Youth career
- –: Hull City

Senior career*
Years	Team	Apps	(Gls)
1979–198?	Hull City	1	(0)
198?–198?	Gainsborough Trinity		
198?–1986	Nuneaton Borough	57	(2)
1986–1989	Scarborough	129	(7)
1989–199?	Hartlepool United	82	(3)
199?–1992	Gainsborough Trinity		
1992–199?	Boston United	0	(0)
- * Club domestic league appearances and goals

Ian Robert Bennyworth (born 15 January 1962) is an English former professional footballer who made 173 appearances in the Football League. A central defender, he played league football for Hull City, Scarborough and Hartlepool United. He also played non-league football for clubs including Gainsborough Trinity (in two separate spells), Nuneaton Borough and Boston United, and was a member of the Scarborough team that won the 1986–87 Football Conference to become the first club automatically promoted to the Football League.

== Football career ==
Bennyworth began his football career as an apprentice with Hull City. He made his first-team debut as a 17-year-old in the last match of the 1979–80 season, a 1–0 defeat to Bury in the Third Division, and came on as a substitute in an Anglo-Scottish Cup match at the beginning of the following season, but those were his only competitive appearances. He moved on to Gainsborough Trinity, where he played in the Northern Premier League, before moving up a level to Nuneaton Borough of the Alliance Premier League (which became the Football Conference). He made 57 appearances at that level for Nuneaton, then, in September 1986, signed for their divisional rivals Scarborough for a fee of £1,500. Because the club had little money to spare, the fee was paid in instalments by Bennyworth himself.

Playing alongside Steve Richards and Paul Kendall, Bennyworth was a regular in Scarborough's defence as they won the division, six points clear of favourites Barnet, to become the first team to benefit from the introduction of direct promotion and relegation between Conference and League in place of the longstanding re-election system. His second appearance in the Football League was Scarborough's first: a 2–2 draw at home to Wolverhampton Wanderers marred by £20,000-worth of damage to the ground, fighting on the terraces, 54 arrests, and a visiting supporter falling through the roof of a stand. The Guardian's correspondent thought him "outstanding" as Scarborough won at Scunthorpe United in November.

In the club's second season in the League, Bennyworth helped them reach the play-off semi-final and eliminate Second Division Portsmouth from the League Cup. He and Scarborough went one better the following season, in what the Daily Mirror dubbed "one of the most humiliating Cup defeats in [Chelsea's] history". Scarborough were two goals behind on the night, 3–1 down on aggregate, to Chelsea, who were then in second place in the First Division, with 24 minutes to go in the second round of the League Cup. They drew level with goals from Tommy Graham and Paul Robinson, then Martin Russell converted a penalty to complete the victory.

After 129 appearances in League and Conference for Scarborough, Bennyworth and teammate Paul Olsson signed for Fourth Division rivals Hartlepool United in December 1989 for £15,000 apiece. Bennyworth scored on debut in a 4–1 defeat of his previous employers. As a regular member of the starting eleven for the next two years, he contributed to Hartlepool's promotion to the Third Division, only the second time the club had been promoted in their 70-year Football League history. He made his last Hartlepool appearance in November 1991, then returned to Gainsborough for a second spell, and was later on the books of Boston United.

== Personal life ==
Bennyworth was born in Hull, which was then in the East Riding of Yorkshire. He began work at a local travel agency as a 19-year-old, and continued that career alongside his footballing one, even when playing in the Football League. He developed his career in the corporate travel sector, working both in England and the United States, and as of 2013, was director of international sales for a fares management system.
