= 1982–83 Celtic F.C. season =

Celtic
1982–83 season
- Chairman: Desmond White
- Manager: Billy McNeill
- Stadium: Celtic Park
- Scottish Premier Division: 2nd
- Scottish Cup: Semi-finalists
- Scottish League Cup: Winners
- European Cup: 2nd round
- Top goalscorer: League: Charlie Nicholas 29; All: Charlie Nicholas 48
- Highest home attendance: 60,408
- Lowest home attendance: 10,691
- Average home league attendance: 23,740

During the 1982–83 Scottish football season, Celtic competed in the Scottish Premier Division. Celtic entered the 1982-1983 season as League Champions. During the pre-season Celtic made only one signing bringing in full back Graeme Sinclair from Dumbarton

== Competitions ==
=== Scottish Premier Division ===
==== League table ====
Pos	Team	Pld	W	D	L	GF	GA	GD	Pts	Qualification or relegation
1	Dundee United (C)	36	24	8	4	90	35	+55	56	Qualification for the European Cup first round
2	Celtic	36	25	5	6	90	36	+54	55	Qualification for the UEFA Cup first round
3	Aberdeen	36	25	5	6	76	25	+51	55	Qualification for the Cup Winners' Cup first round
4	Rangers	36	13	12	11	53	41	+12	38	Qualification for the Cup Winners' Cup first round
5	St Mirren	36	11	12	13	47	51	−4	34	Qualification for the UEFA Cup first round

Source: Statto
Rules for classification: 1) points; 2) goal difference; 3) number of goals scored.
(C) Champions

==== Matches ====
4 September 1982 Premier League	Celtic	2–0	Dundee	Glasgow
15:00				Stadium: Celtic Park; Attendance: 19,122

11 September 1982 Premier League	St Mirren	1–2	Celtic	Paisley
15:00				Stadium: St Mirren Park, Love Street; Attendance: 15,400

18 September 1982 Premier League	Motherwell	0–7	Celtic	Motherwell
15:00				Stadium: Fir Park; Attendance: 17,092

25 September 1982 Premier League	Celtic	2–0	Hibernian	Glasgow
15:00				Stadium: Celtic Park; Attendance: 16,371

2 October 1982 Premier League	Dundee United	2–2	Celtic	Dundee
15:00 BST				Stadium: Tannadice Park; Attendance: 20,009

9 October 1982 Premier League	Celtic	1–3	Aberdeen	Glasgow
15:00 BST				Stadium: Celtic Park; Attendance: 29,733

16 October 1982 Premier League	Celtic	2–1	Kilmarnock	Glasgow
15:00 BST				Stadium: Celtic Park; Attendance: 11,063

23 October 1982 Premier League	Morton	1–2	Celtic	Greenock
15:00 BST				Stadium: Cappielow Park; Attendance: 11,002

30 October 1982 Premier League	Celtic	3–2	Rangers	Glasgow
15:00 BST				Stadium: Celtic Park; Attendance: 60,408

6 November 1982 Premier League	Dundee	2–3	Celtic	Dundee
15:00 BST				Stadium: Dens Park; Attendance: 11,681

13 November 1982 Premier League	Celtic	5–0	St Mirren	Glasgow
15:00 BST				Stadium: Celtic Park; Attendance: 15,044

20 November 1982 Premier League	Celtic	3–1	Motherwell	Glasgow
15:00 GMT				Stadium: Celtic Park; Attendance: 14,963

27 November 1982 Premier League	Hibernian	2–3	Celtic	Edinburgh
15:00 GMT				Stadium: Easter Road; Attendance: 17,121

11 December 1982 Premier League	Aberdeen	1–2	Celtic	Aberdeen
15:00 GMT				Stadium: Pittodrie Stadium; Attendance: 22,284

18 December 1982 Premier League	Kilmarnock	0–4	Celtic	Kilmarnock
15:00 GMT				Stadium: Rugby Park; Attendance: 9,024

27 December 1982 Premier League	Celtic	5–1	Morton	Glasgow
15:00 GMT				Stadium: Celtic Park; Attendance: 19,953

1 January 1983 Premier League	Rangers	1–2	Celtic	Glasgow
15:00 GMT				Stadium: Ibrox Stadium; Attendance: 42,092

3 January 1983 Premier League	Celtic	2–2	Dundee	Glasgow
15:00 GMT				Stadium: Celtic Park; Attendance: 16,615

8 January 1983 Premier League	St Mirren	0–1	Celtic	Paisley
15:00 GMT				Stadium: St Mirren Park, Love Street; Attendance: 14,799

15 January 1983 Premier League	Motherwell	2–1	Celtic	Motherwell
15:00 GMT				Stadium: Fir Park; Attendance: 15,290

22 January 1983 Premier League	Celtic	4–1	Hibernian	Glasgow
15:00 GMT				Stadium: Celtic Park; Attendance: 17,106

5 February 1983 Premier League	Dundee United	1–1	Celtic	Dundee
15:00 GMT				Stadium: Tannadice Park; Attendance: 17,289

12 February 1983 Premier League	Celtic	1–3	Aberdeen	Glasgow
15:00 GMT				Stadium: Celtic Park; Attendance: 42,831

26 February 1983 Premier League	Celtic	4–0	Kilmarnock	Glasgow
15:00 GMT				Stadium: Celtic Park; Attendance: 10,691

5 March 1983 Premier League	Morton	0–3	Celtic	Greenock
15:00 GMT				Stadium: Cappielow Park; Attendance: 8,417

19 March 1983 Premier League	Dundee	2–1	Celtic	Dundee
15:00 GMT				Stadium: Dens Park; Attendance: 11,196

23 March 1983 Premier League	Celtic	0–0	Rangers	Glasgow
19:30 GMT				Stadium: Celtic Park; Attendance: 50,939

26 March 1983 Premier League	Celtic	1–1	St Mirren	Glasgow
15:00 GMT				Stadium: Celtic Park; Attendance: 15,935

2 April 1983 Premier League	Celtic	3–0	Motherwell	Glasgow
15:00 GMT				Stadium: Celtic Park; Attendance: 15,454

6 April 1983 Premier League	Celtic	2–0	Dundee United	Glasgow
19:30 BST				Stadium: Celtic Park; Attendance: 34,508

9 April 1983 Premier League	Hibernian	0–3	Celtic	Edinburgh
15:00 BST				Stadium: Easter Road; Attendance: 16,531

20 April 1983 Premier League	Celtic	2–3	Dundee United	Glasgow
19:30 BST				Stadium: Celtic Park; Attendance: 23,965

23 April 1983 Premier League	Aberdeen	1–0	Celtic	Glasgow
15:00 BST				Stadium: Celtic Park; Attendance: 23,564

30 April 1983 Premier League	Kilmarnock	0–5	Celtic	Kilmarnock
15:00 BST				Stadium: Rugby Park; Attendance: 7,560

7 May 1983 Premier League	Celtic	2–0	Morton	Glasgow
15:00 BST				Stadium: Celtic Park; Attendance: 12,610

14 May 1983 Premier League	Rangers	2–4	Celtic	Glasgow
15:00 BST				Stadium: Ibrox Stadium; Attendance: 40,648

=== Scottish Cup ===
29 January 1983 Third round	Clydebank	0–3	Celtic	Clydebank
15:00 GMT				Stadium: Kilbowie Park; Attendance: 9,500

19 February 1983 Fourth round	Celtic	3–0	Dunfermline Athletic	Glasgow
15:00 GMT				Stadium: Celtic Park; Attendance: 12,374

12 March 1983 Fifth round	Celtic	4–1	Hearts	Glasgow
15:00 GMT				Stadium: Celtic Park; Attendance: 25,458

16 April 1983 Semi-final	Aberdeen	1–0	Celtic	Glasgow
15:00 GMT				Stadium: Hampden Park; Attendance: 47,032

=== Scottish League Cup ===
14 August 1982 Group stage	Celtic	6–0	Dunfermline Athletic	Glasgow
15:00 GMT				Stadium: Celtic Park; Attendance: 14,507

18 August 1982 Group stage	Alloa Athletic	0–5	Celtic	Alloa
19:30 GMT				Stadium: Recreation Park; Attendance: 4,374

21 August 1982 Group stage	Arbroath	0–3	Celtic	Arbroath
15:00 GMT				Stadium: Gayfield Park; Attendance: 5,275

25 August 1982 Group stage	Celtic	4–1	Alloa Athletic	Glasgow
19:30 GMT				Stadium: Celtic Park; Attendance: 5,202

28 August 1982 Group stage	Dunfermline Athletic	1–7	Celtic	Dunfermline
15:00 GMT				Stadium: East End Park; Attendance: 6,866

1 September 1982 Group stage	Celtic	4–1	Arbroath	Glasgow
19:30 GMT				Stadium: Celtic Park; Attendance: 5,202

8 September 1982 Quarter-final 1st leg	Celtic	4–0	Partick Thistle	Glasgow
19:30 GMT				Stadium: Celtic Park; Attendance: 9,248

22 September 1982 Quarter-final 2nd leg	Partick Thistle	0–3	Celtic	Glasgow
19:30 GMT				Stadium: Firhill Park; Attendance: 5,238

27 October 1982 Semi-finals 1st leg	Celtic	2–0	Dundee United	Glasgow
19:30 GMT				Stadium: Celtic Park; Attendance: 19,149

10 November 1982 Semi-final 2nd leg	Dundee United	2–1	Celtic	Dundee
19:30 GMT				Stadium: Tannadice Park; Attendance: 15,522

4 December 1982 Final	Celtic	2–1	Rangers	Glasgow
15:00 GMT				Stadium: Hampden Park; Attendance: 55,372

=== European Cup ===
15 September 1982 1st round 1st leg	Celtic (Scotland)	2–2	(Netherlands) AFC Ajax	Glasgow
20:00 GMT				Stadium: Celtic Park; Attendance: 56,299

29 September 1982 1st round 2nd leg	AFC Ajax (Netherlands)	1–2 (3–4 agg.)	(Scotland) Celtic	Amsterdam
20:00 GMT				Stadium: De Meer Stadion; Attendance: 52,326

20 October 1982 2nd round 1st leg	Real Sociedad (Spain)	2–0	(Scotland) Celtic	San Sebastián
20:00 GMT				Stadium: Atotxa Stadium; Attendance: 27,000

3 November 1982 2nd round 2nd leg	Celtic (Scotland)	2–1 (2–3 agg.)	(Spain) Real Sociedad	Glasgow
20:00 GMT				Stadium: Celtic Park; Attendance: 54,874

== Staff ==
Board of Directors
Position	Name
Chairman	Desmond White
Secretary	Desmond White
Directors	Thomas Devlin James Farrell Kevin Kelly Jack McGinn Christopher White

Football Staff
Position	Name
Manager	Billy McNeill
Assistant manager	John Clark
Reserve Team Manager	Bobby Lennox
Trainer	Neil Mochan
Physio	Brian Scott
Masseur	Jimmy Steele

== Transfers ==
Transfers In
Date	Name	From	Transfer Fee
July 1982	Graeme Sinclair	Dumbarton F.C.	£60,000
		Total Transfer Fees	£60,000

Transfers Out
Date	Name	To	Transfer Fee
May 1982	John Weir	Airdrieonians F.C.	Free transfer
October 1982	Mike Conroy	Hibernian F.C.	£40,000
November 1982	Willie Garner	Alloa Athletic F.C.	Free transfer
		Total Transfer Fees	£40,000
