= 1984–85 in English football =

Football in England
- Season: 1984–85

Men's football
- First Division: Everton
- Second Division: Oxford United
- Third Division: Bradford City
- Fourth Division: Chesterfield
- Alliance Premier League: Wealdstone
- FA Cup: Manchester United
- Associate Members' Cup: Wigan Athletic
- League Cup: Norwich City
- Charity Shield: Everton

The 1984–85 season was the 105th season of competitive football in England.

The season saw Everton build on their FA Cup success of the previous season by winning their first league title for 15 years and their first European silverware in the form of the European Cup Winners' Cup. However, they lost the FA Cup final to Manchester United. Norwich City won the Football League Cup but were relegated from the First Division.

History, major events and remaining sections

== Major events and tragedies ==
However, the season was overshadowed by three major tragedies involving English clubs. On 11 May 1985, the last day of the league season, a teenage spectator was killed at St Andrew's stadium in a Second Division clash between Birmingham City and Leeds United in another incident of hooliganism. A far worse tragedy occurred on the same day when the Bradford City stadium fire ripped through the main stand of Third Division champions Bradford City, killing 56 spectators. On 29 May, at the European Cup Final in Brussels, rioting by Liverpool fans led to the Heysel Stadium disaster, in which 39 spectators (most of them Italian) were crushed or trampled to death. Shortly after the game, which Juventus won 1–0, all English clubs were banned from European competitions for an indefinite period (five years for most clubs, six for Liverpool).

== League season ==
Howard Kendall's Everton side won the First Division title with 90 points, finishing 13 points ahead of runners-up Liverpool. They clinched the championship with five games to spare. Everton also won the European Cup Winners' Cup, defeating Rapid Vienna 3–1 in the final. Manchester United won the FA Cup, denying Everton a potential double.

In the lower divisions, Oxford United won the Second Division, Bradford City won the Third Division (despite the stadium fire), and Chesterfield won the Fourth Division.

Relegated from the First Division were Norwich City, Sunderland, and Stoke City.

== See also ==
- 1984–85 in English football
- 1984–85 Football League
- Bradford City stadium fire
- Heysel Stadium disaster

== Bradford City stadium fire ==
56 spectators died and more than 200 were injured when a fire ripped through the Main Stand at Valley Parade during Bradford City's Third Division fixture with Lincoln City on 11 May. This tragedy was seen by many as a wake-up call for English clubs to improve the state of their grounds and take more drastic safety measures to bring an end to problems which had been plaguing the game for years without any effective action being taken.

== Heysel disaster ==
On 29 May 1985, less than three weeks after the Bradford fire, 39 spectators (mostly Italian) were killed on the terraces of Heysel Stadium in Brussels, when a wall collapsed at the European Cup final between Liverpool and Juventus. As a result, all English clubs were banned indefinitely from European competition with Liverpool ordered to serve an extra three years whenever the other English sides were re-admitted.

== Diary of the season ==
18 August 1984: Everton win the Charity Shield by beating Merseyside rivals Liverpool 1–0 at Wembley. The only goal is inadvertently deflected into his own net by Reds' goalkeeper Bruce Grobbelaar.

25 August 1984: The new league season has an early start as the London derby between Arsenal and Chelsea kicks off at 11:30am on police advice. The match ends in a 1–1 draw in front of over 45,000 at Highbury. Three penalties (one missed) and an own goal at Carrow Road where Norwich City come from 2–0 and 3–2 down to hold champions Liverpool to a 3–3 draw. Manchester United are pegged back by an 89th minute Watford equaliser at Old Trafford. Everton crash 4–1 at home to Tottenham Hotspur for whom debutants Clive Allen and John Chiedozie are among the scorers. In the Second Division, newly promoted Oxford United win 3–0 at Huddersfield Town but Wimbledon are held to a 2–2 draw by Manchester City after leading 2–0. Biggest winners of the day are Exeter City who beat Northampton Town 5–0 in Division Four.

27 August 1984: Newcastle United and Aston Villa both have two wins from their opening two matches but Stoke City and Everton are still looking for their first points. Paul Walsh scores after 14 seconds of his home debut for Liverpool, a 3–0 win over West Ham United.

31 August 1984: Everton get off the mark with a 1–0 win at Chelsea who were previously unbeaten since January.

1 September 1984: Newcastle United beat Aston Villa 3–0 to top the league with the First Division's only 100% record after three games. Crowd trouble interrupts the match between Coventry City and Leicester City at Highfield Road. Peter Davenport scores a hat-trick as Nottingham Forest beat Sunderland 3–1 and Derby County's Kevin Wilson also scores three in his side's 3–2 win over Bolton Wanderers. Earlier in the week, Wilson scored four in a Milk Cup tie against Hartlepool United.

4 September 1984: Newcastle United drop their first points in a 2–0 defeat at Arsenal. Tottenham Hotspur have Graham Roberts and Clive Allen sent off as they lose 1–0 at Sunderland.

5 September 1984: Nottingham Forest go top after a Trevor Christie hat-trick helps them to a resounding 5–0 win at Aston Villa.

8 September 1984: Arsenal lead the First Division for the first time since February 1973 following their 3–1 win over Liverpool at Highbury. Manchester United beat Newcastle United 5–0 to register their first win after four draws. Billy Bonds makes his 700th league appearance by coming on as substitute in West Ham United's 2–0 win over Watford. Reading lose 4–1 to Doncaster Rovers at Elm Park following a run of 29 home league games without defeat.

15 September 1984: Clive Allen scores twice against his former club as Tottenham Hotspur beat Queens Park Rangers 5–0 to displace North London rivals Arsenal from top spot. The Gunners are beaten 2–1 at Ipswich Town. At Stamford Bridge, Chelsea's Colin Lee sees his penalty saved by West Ham United keeper Tom McAlister but scores from the rebound. Referee Trevor Spencer orders a retake – Lee's second effort is also saved but he again scores from the rebound. The home side go on to win 3–0.

16 September 1984: Nottingham Forest return to the top with a 3–1 win over Luton Town at the City Ground.

18 September 1984: Back in European competition for the first time in eight years, Queens Park Rangers enjoy a 3–0 first leg win over KR Reykjavík in the UEFA Cup. Second Division leaders Birmingham City drop their first points of the season, beaten 1–0 at home by Portsmouth.

19 September 1984: Liverpool begin their defence of the European Cup with a 1–0 win over Lech Poznań in Poland. In the UEFA Cup, Manchester United and Tottenham Hotspur enjoy comfortable wins but Nottingham Forest and Southampton both draw at home. Everton are surprisingly held by University College Dublin in the Cup Winners' Cup. The last two 100% league records come to an end as Hereford United draw with Chester City and Chesterfield lose at Hartlepool United.

22 September 1984: Aggregate attendances are the lowest of the season so far but there is no shortage of goals. Queens Park Rangers and Newcastle United draw an extraordinary match 5–5 at Loftus Road. Newcastle led 4–0 at half-time with Chris Waddle contributing a hat-trick. Bolton Wanderers beat Plymouth Argyle 7–2 with Tony Caldwell scoring three. John Deehan scores a hat-trick in Norwich City's 3–2 win over Watford at Carrow Road. In the same fixture last season, Deehan scored four.

24 September 1984: Milk Cup holders Liverpool are held to a goalless draw in the first leg of their second round tie with Stockport County at Edgeley Park.

25 September 1984: Nottingham Forest are the only First Division side beaten in tonight's Milk Cup matches, losing 1–0 at Portsmouth. John Barnes scores a hat-trick as Watford win for the first time this season, beating Cardiff City 3–1.

26 September 1984: Struggling Stoke City lose 2–1 at home to Rotherham United in the Milk Cup. Young Welsh forward Mark Hughes scores his first senior hat-trick in Manchester United's 4–0 win over Burnley. Garth Crooks also scores three as league leaders Tottenham Hotspur win 5–1 at Halifax Town.

29 September 1984: Another day of high scoring in today's fixtures – 153 goals at an average of more than three per match. Plymouth Argyle beat Preston North End 6–4 and Everton win by the odd goal in nine at Watford who slip to the bottom of the First Division. Leeds United beat Oldham Athletic 6–0 with Andy Ritchie scoring three. Other hat-trick heroes include Gary Stevens of Shrewsbury Town and Barnsley's David Geddis. Pat Jennings marks his 750th league appearance by saving a Kenny Hibbitt penalty in Arsenal's 2–1 win at Coventry City. Liverpool in turmoil – Grobbelaar has a nightmare as Sheffield Wednesday beat them 2–0 at Anfield. The champions have won only two of their eight league matches this season.

2 October 1984: Queens Park Rangers easily make it through to the second round of the UEFA Cup with a 4–0 win over KR Reykjavik, 7–0 on aggregate. The match is played at Highbury as UEFA will not allow Rangers to use their artificial pitch at Loftus Road. Everton beat University College Dublin in the Cup Winners' Cup but only thanks to a single Graeme Sharp goal at Goodison Park. Fourth Division leaders Hereford United concede their first league goals of the season in their eighth match, a 3–1 defeat at Chesterfield.

3 October 1984: Nottingham Forest and Southampton are knocked out of Europe but Liverpool, Manchester United, Tottenham Hotspur and Wrexham all progress. John Wark scores a hat-trick in Liverpool's 4–0 win over Lech Poznań and Garth Crooks bags three for the second time in eight days as Spurs beat Braga 6–0.

6 October 1984: Arsenal are back on top of the table – a Charlie Nicholas penalty gives them victory over Everton while Tottenham Hotspur lose 1–0 at Southampton. Liverpool's woes continue as West Bromwich Albion hold them to a goalless draw at Anfield. The last unbeaten record in the First Division goes as Manchester United lose 3–0 at Aston Villa. On-loan French winger Didier Six stars on his Villa debut. With Oxford United losing 1–0 at Manchester City – their first defeat away from home since February – Portsmouth are now the only side yet to be beaten in the league this season.

9 October 1984: Coventry City crash out of the Milk Cup, beaten 3–0 at home by last season's semi-finalists Walsall, 4–2 on aggregate. Liverpool need extra time to get past Stockport County.

12 October 1984: Tottenham Hotspur move ahead of Arsenal on goal difference at the top of the table with a 1–0 win over Liverpool.

13 October 1984: Arsenal return to the summit with a 4–1 win at Leicester City. Manchester United remain in touch with a 5–1 win over West Ham United. Watford, the only side without a league win this season, break their duck by beating Chelsea 3–2 at Stamford Bridge.

14 October 1984: Cardiff City move off the bottom of the Second Division at the expense of Notts County with a 2–0 win at Meadow Lane.

20 October 1984: A watershed moment in the season as Everton win at Anfield for the first time in 14 years. Graeme Sharp scores the only goal with a brilliant volley. Arsenal unveil their new 18ft x 14ft video screen for extra match day entertainment, the first of its kind in English football. On the pitch, the Gunners beat Sunderland 3–2 to retain top spot. Tottenham Hotspur slip to fifth after a 1–0 defeat at Manchester United while Sheffield Wednesday move up to second with a 5–0 win over Leicester City. Portsmouth suffer their first league defeat, losing 3–2 at Wimbledon.

24 October 1984: In only his second match back following a knee operation, Ian Rush scores a hat-trick in Liverpool's 3–1 European Cup win over Benfica. Everton win at Fortuna Sittard in the Cup Winners' Cup through an early goal by Paul Bracewell. In the UEFA Cup, Queens Park Rangers beat Partizan Belgrade 6–2 at Highbury but Tottenham Hotspur lose to Bruges with Glenn Hoddle sent off and Manchester United draw with PSV Eindhoven.

27 October 1984: In-form Everton thrash Manchester United 5–0, United's biggest margin of defeat since losing 6–0 at Ipswich Town in March 1980. Leaders Arsenal are beaten 3–1 at West Ham United. Tottenham Hotspur heap more misery on bottom club Stoke City with a 4–0 win at White Hart Lane. Leicester City striker Gary Lineker scores a hat-trick in his side's 5–0 win over Aston Villa.

28 October 1984: Having slipped into the bottom three, Liverpool begin the climb to safety with a 2–0 win at Nottingham Forest.

30 October 1984: Chelsea need a late Colin Lee equaliser to rescue a 2–2 draw at Walsall in the Milk Cup third round. Everton beat Manchester United for the second time in four days, 2–1 at Old Trafford. Ex-Evertonian John Gidman heads the winner into his own goal.

31 October 1984: Arsenal are knocked out of the Milk Cup, beaten 3–2 at Second Division leaders Oxford United. David Langan scores the winner thanks to a mistake by Pat Jennings. Liverpool's 1–0 defeat at Tottenham Hotspur is the first tie the holders have lost in the competition since the 1979–80 season. Improving Watford enjoy a comprehensive 4–0 win at Leeds United.

2 November 1984: Gordon Strachan scores twice as Manchester United beat Arsenal 4–2 at Old Trafford, the Gunners' third consecutive defeat in the space of seven days.

3 November 1984: Everton go top of the league by beating Leicester City 3–0. Kerry Dixon scores a hat-trick as Chelsea fight back from two down to beat Coventry City 6–2. A late Ronnie Whelan goal gives Liverpool victory at Stoke City. In Division Three, bottom side Cambridge United beat Newport County 2–1, their first away win in 18 months.

6 November 1984: Chelsea brush aside Walsall in their Milk Cup third round replay, scoring three goals without reply in the first 11 minutes. A Howard Gayle goal in extra time is enough for Sunderland to knock out Nottingham Forest who have 18-year-old Paul Raynor sent off.

7 November 1984: Liverpool concede early to Benfica in Lisbon and have Kenny Dalglish sent off, but hang on to reach the European Cup quarter-finals on a 3–2 aggregate. Queens Park Rangers are stunned by Partizan Belgrade in the UEFA Cup, losing on away goals following a 4–0 defeat in Yugoslavia, but Tottenham Hotspur and Manchester United make it through, as do Everton in the Cup Winners' Cup.

10 November 1984: Everton stay top with a 1–0 win over West Ham United at Upton Park. Manchester United and Tottenham Hotspur also win away but Arsenal are held at home by Aston Villa. In the Third Division, Hull City come from 4–1 down to win 5–4 at Orient.

17 November 1984: FA Cup first round day produces its usual selection of surprise results. Altrincham win 1–0 at Blackpool and Northwich Victoria beat Crewe Alexandra 3–1 while seven other non-league clubs take league opposition to a replay. No such luck for Tow Law Town, beaten 7–2 at Bradford City, or Penrith, thrashed 9–0 by Burnley, for whom Kevin Hird and Alan Taylor both score three. In the First Division, leaders Everton beat bottom club Stoke City 4–0 at Goodison Park.

20 November 1984: In the Milk Cup fourth round, Second Division Grimsby Town cause a shock by winning at Everton through a last-minute header by Paul Wilkinson. Andy Blair scores a hat-trick of penalties in Sheffield Wednesday's 4–2 win over Luton Town. Non-league Enfield and Telford United win their FA Cup replays but Kettering Town and Bangor City are knocked out.

21 November 1984: Kerry Dixon scores his second hat-trick of the month as Chelsea beat Manchester City 4–1 in the Milk Cup. In the FA Cup, Bognor Regis Town beat Swansea City 3–1 to reach the second round for the first time in their history.

24 November 1984: Sunderland beat Manchester United 3–2 in a dramatic match at Roker Park. Both sides have a player sent off and Clive Walker scores a hat-trick (including two penalties) after the home side had trailed 2–0, all in the first half. Oxford United also come from two down to beat Leeds United 5–2 at the top of the Second Division with John Aldridge scoring three. Two goals by John Wark give Liverpool their first league win at home for three months, against his former club Ipswich Town. Brighton and Hove Albion score their first goal in six matches but are beaten 2–1 at home by Middlesbrough.

26 November 1984: FA Cup replay joy for Alliance Premier League side Dagenham who win 2–1 after extra time at Swindon Town.

27 November 1984: Queens Park Rangers and Southampton play out a goalless Milk Cup replay at Loftus Road. Steve Moran has an 85th-minute penalty saved by Rangers keeper Peter Hucker.

28 November 1984: Tottenham Hotspur beat Bohemians Prague 2–0 in the UEFA Cup third round but Manchester United are held 2–2 at home by Dundee United. Gordon Strachan scores a penalty but has a second saved by fellow Scot Hamish McAlpine.

1 December 1984: Manchester United and Arsenal narrow the gap on leaders Everton who are held 1–1 by Sheffield Wednesday and have top scorer Adrian Heath carried off with a serious knee injury. In the Second Division, Portsmouth and Blackburn Rovers draw a top of the table clash 2–2 at Fratton Park with the home side fighting back after gifting the visitors two own goals.

5 December 1984: Sunderland surprise Tottenham Hotspur in the Milk Cup with a 2–1 replay win at White Hart Lane. Goalkeeper Chris Turner saves a Graham Roberts penalty. Queens Park Rangers finally put out Southampton 4–0 in their second replay.

8 December 1984: Tottenham Hotspur move to within a point of Everton after coming from behind to beat Newcastle United 3–1. The leaders are held 0–0 at Queens Park Rangers where Pat Van Den Hauwe and Simon Stainrod are sent off. Manchester United lose at Nottingham Forest and Southampton beat Arsenal – only three points now separate the top five. Telford United record the most eye-catching result in the FA Cup second round, a 4–1 win at Preston North End. Other non-league clubs through to round three are Burton Albion, winners at Aldershot, and Dagenham, who knock out Peterborough United.

9 December 1984: Independiente of Argentina beat Liverpool 1–0 to win the World Club Championship in Tokyo.

12 December 1984: Manchester United win 3–2 at Dundee United (5–4 aggregate) and Tottenham Hotspur draw 1–1 with Bohemians Prague (3–1 aggregate) to ensure safe passage through to the UEFA Cup quarter-finals.

15 December 1984: Everton maintain their place at the top of the First Division with a 5–0 win over Nottingham Forest for whom Chris Fairclough is sent off and Gary Mills breaks a leg. Southampton lose 2–1 at Coventry City, their first league defeat since 4 September.

21 December 1984: Liverpool's revival continues with a 2–0 win at Queens Park Rangers that moves them up to fifth in the table.

22 December 1984: Tottenham Hotspur win 2–1 at Norwich City to reclaim leadership of the First Division as Everton are beaten 4–3 at home by Chelsea, for whom recent signing Gordon Davies scores a hat-trick. Two goals in the last two minutes by transfer-listed Alan Biley give Portsmouth a 2–1 win over Oxford United.

26 December 1984: Bottom of the First Division with only one win and eight points all season, Stoke City stun Manchester United 2–1 at the Victoria Ground. Liverpool suffer a surprise home defeat to Leicester City but Everton win at Sunderland. Tottenham Hotspur stay top on goal difference despite being held at home by West Ham United.

29 December 1984: The year ends with Tottenham Hotspur heading the First Division after beating Sunderland 2–0. Everton win by the same score at Ipswich Town to stay on their heels. Blackburn Rovers top Division Two although a 3–1 home defeat to Huddersfield Town cuts their lead to three points while Bradford City and Bury are both clear at the top of the Third and Fourth Divisions respectively.

1 January 1985: Status quo maintained as Tottenham Hotspur win at Arsenal and Everton beat Luton Town. Stoke City suffer another pasting, this time 4–0 at Coventry City. Peter Beardsley scores a hat-trick as Newcastle United beat Sunderland 3–1. In Division Two, Fulham stage a remarkable fightback from 4–0 down to draw 4–4 at Portsmouth.

5 January 1985: FA Cup third round shocks include Orient's 2–1 win over West Bromwich Albion and Queens Park Rangers' 1–0 defeat at Doncaster Rovers. Burton Albion are beaten 6–1 by Leicester City at the Baseball Ground after their goalkeeper Paul Evans is left dazed by a missile thrown from the crowd with the score level at 1–1. The FA subsequently orders the match to be replayed. Trouble too at Highfield Road where Manchester City fans riot as their side go down 2–1 to Coventry City. Telford United knock out Third Division leaders Bradford City but Dagenham are beaten at Carlisle United. Hereford United, second in Division Four, hold Arsenal and Wigan Athletic draw at Chelsea after being two goals ahead. At White Hart Lane, Mark Aizlewood earns Charlton Athletic a replay with a scrambled equaliser after seeing his initial penalty saved by Ray Clemence. Luther Blissett scores four in Watford's 5–0 drubbing of Sheffield United.

8 January 1985: Fourth Division Darlington beat Middlesbrough 2–1 in an FA Cup replay at Feethams. The match is held up for 10 minutes during the second half following a pitch invasion.

9 January 1985: Only two FA Cup replays survive as cold weather begins to bite. Luton Town score two early goals on their way to a 3–2 win at Stoke City while Nottingham Forest win 3–1 in extra time at Newcastle United.

12 January 1985: Tottenham Hotspur are held to a 2–2 draw at Queens Park Rangers and relinquish the league leadership to Everton who beat Newcastle United 4–0. A frozen pitch causes Sunderland's match with Liverpool at Roker Park to be abandoned at half-time. Manchester United are beaten 1–0 by Coventry City, their second successive home defeat, and lose captain Bryan Robson to a shoulder injury.

16 January 1985: Leicester City win their replayed FA Cup tie with Burton Albion 1–0 behind closed doors at Highfield Road. Norwich City are the first team through to the semi-finals of the Milk Cup following a 1–0 win at Grimsby Town. Juventus beat Liverpool 2–0 in Turin to win the European Super Cup. Polish international striker Zbigniew Boniek scores both goals.

19 January 1985: Arctic conditions decimate today's fixture programme with only 10 matches played across the four divisions. Three survive in the First Division – Liverpool beat Norwich City 4–0 while Aston Villa win 3–0 at Coventry City and Chelsea draw 1–1 with Arsenal. In the Second Division, Manchester City move into the top three by beating Wimbledon 3–0 and a Tommy Wright hat-trick helps Leeds United to a 5–0 win over Notts County.

22 January 1985: The three times postponed FA Cup replay between Arsenal and Hereford United finally results in a 7–2 win for the First Division side.

23 January 1985: Sunderland join Norwich City in the Milk Cup semi-finals with a 1–0 win at Watford while Queens Park Rangers hold Ipswich Town to a goalless draw at Portman Road. In FA Cup replays, Tottenham Hotspur, Huddersfield Town and Millwall all make it through to round four, but Norwich City and Birmingham City must try again after drawing 1–1 at Carrow Road.

26 January 1985: Third Division York City cause the biggest FA Cup upset of the season – a last-minute Keith Houchen penalty gives them victory over Arsenal at Bootham Crescent. Manchester United reserve goalkeeper Stephen Pears saves a Terry Gibson penalty in his side's 2–1 win over Coventry City. In delayed third round replays, Blackburn Rovers beat Portsmouth 2–1 and Chelsea win 5–0 at Wigan Athletic with goal machine Kerry Dixon netting four. The Birmingham City–Norwich City marathon continues as the two sides draw a second replay 1–1 at St Andrew's.

27 January 1985: Ian Rush scores the only goal to give Liverpool victory over Tottenham Hotspur in the heavyweight clash of the FA Cup fourth round.

28 January 1985: Ipswich Town win 2–1 at Queens Park Rangers in the Milk Cup but the fourth semi-finalist is still undecided as Chelsea are held 1–1 by Sheffield Wednesday. A goal credited to Steve Bruce at last sees Norwich City overcome Birmingham City in the FA Cup third round.

30 January 1985: Sheffield Wednesday and Chelsea draw a thrilling Milk Cup replay 4–4 at Hillsborough. Chelsea came from 3–0 down to lead 4–3 during normal time and then kicked off in both halves of extra time. In the FA Cup, Blackburn Rovers win at Oxford United and Wimbledon beat Nottingham Forest in a replay. Last season, as a Third Division club, the Dons knocked Forest out of the Milk Cup.

2 February 1985: Everton beat Watford 4–0 to go four points clear of Tottenham Hotspur, who are held to a 2–2 draw at Luton Town. The top four in Division Two are separated only by goal difference. Oxford United lead the way after winning 1–0 at Carlisle United, displacing Blackburn Rovers who draw 1–1 at Wimbledon. Manchester City and Birmingham City complete the quartet after away wins at Crystal Palace and Huddersfield Town respectively.

4 February 1985: Telford United, the last remaining non-league side in the FA Cup, beat Darlington 3–0 to book a fifth round tie at Everton. Chelsea are shocked 3–2 at home by Third Division promotion chasers Millwall.

6 February 1985: Mickey Thomas scores a last-minute winner as Chelsea beat Sheffield Wednesday 2–1 at the third time of asking in the Milk Cup quarter-final.

9 February 1985: More bad weather hits today's fixture list with only 16 matches surviving the freeze. Manchester United are held 1–1 at Newcastle United and miss the opportunity to make serious ground on Everton and Tottenham Hotspur. Manchester City also slip up in Division Two, beaten 3–1 at home by Carlisle United.

13 February 1985: Sunderland establish a 2–0 lead over Chelsea in the first leg of their Milk Cup semi-final. Two penalties by Colin West decide the match – he scores the first and converts a rebound after the second is saved by Eddie Niedzwiecki.

16 February 1985: Everton end Telford United's FA Cup adventure with a 3–0 win at Goodison Park but York City score an 86th-minute equaliser to take Liverpool to a replay. Bradford City extend their lead at the top of the Third Division to 12 points with a 2–0 win at third placed Hull City.

19 February 1985: Millwall make the FA Cup quarter-finals with a 2–0 win over Leicester City at The Den.

20 February 1985: John Wark scores a hat-trick as Liverpool register a decisive 7–0 FA Cup replay win over York City at Anfield.

23 February 1985: Two goals by Andy Gray – his first since September – give Everton an important 2–1 win at Leicester City. Kenny Dalglish celebrates his 300th league appearance by scoring in Liverpool's 2–0 win over Stoke City. A goal by Mich d'Avray gives Ipswich Town a slender 1–0 advantage from the first leg of their Milk Cup semi-final against Norwich City.

24 February 1985: At the foot of the Second Division, Crystal Palace's relegation fears deepen as they suffer a 5–0 defeat at home to Wimbledon.

2 March 1985: Both sides miss a penalty as Everton draw 1–1 at Manchester United, enabling Tottenham Hotspur to close the gap at the top to two points with a 1–0 win at Stoke City. Manchester City replace Blackburn Rovers as leaders in the Second Division with a 1–0 win at Ewood Park. Oxford United are beaten 3–0 by Birmingham City, their first league defeat at home in nearly a year. Charlton Athletic fight back from 3–0 down to win 5–3 against Barnsley for whom Ron Futcher scores a hat-trick and is later sent off.

4 March 1985: Over 100 people are arrested after serious crowd trouble disrupts the second leg of the Milk Cup semi-final between Chelsea and Sunderland. The Wearsiders win 3–2 to reach the final 5–2 on aggregate. In the FA Cup fifth round, Southampton suffer a surprise home defeat to Barnsley while a late goal by Alan Sunderland gives Ipswich Town a 3–2 win over Sheffield Wednesday.

6 March 1985: An Andy Gray hat-trick helps Everton to a comfortable win over Fortuna Sittard in the Cup Winners' Cup while Liverpool gain a useful 1–1 away draw with Austria Vienna in the European Cup. In the UEFA Cup, Manchester United narrowly beat Videoton but a Steve Perryman own goal against Real Madrid consigns Tottenham Hotspur to their first ever home defeat in European competition. Norwich City beat Ipswich Town 2–0 at Carrow Road to reach the Milk Cup final. In FA Cup replays, West Ham United beat Wimbledon 5–1 with Tony Cottee scoring three while Watford and Luton Town draw 2–2 after extra time at Vicarage Road.

9 March 1985: Norman Whiteside scores a hat-trick as Manchester United make the FA Cup semi-finals with a 4–2 win over West Ham United. Ipswich Town take Everton to a replay with a 2–2 draw at Goodison Park. Luton Town beat Watford 1–0 to reach the sixth round. Midfielder Wayne Turner scores the only goal on his 24th birthday.

10 March 1985: Liverpool win 4–0 at Barnsley in the FA Cup with Ian Rush notching up yet another hat-trick.

12 March 1985: A 2–1 win at Tottenham Hotspur pushes Manchester United back into contention for the league title. Three players are sent off in the goalless draw between Stoke City and West Bromwich Albion.

13 March 1985: Another explosion of football violence occurs as Millwall hooligans riot before, during and after their team's FA Cup quarter-final tie at Luton Town which ends in a 1–0 win for the home side. Everton complete the semi-final line-up with a 1–0 replay win at Ipswich Town.

15 March 1985: On his return from injury, Bryan Robson scores shortly after coming on as a substitute in Manchester United's 2–2 draw at West Ham United.

16 March 1985: Tottenham Hotspur beat Liverpool at Anfield for the first time since 1912 to move level on points with leaders Everton. Garth Crooks scores the only goal in the 71st minute. Sunderland win 3–1 at Norwich City in a dress rehearsal for next weekend's Milk Cup final.

20 March 1985: A mixed night for English clubs in Europe. Liverpool and Everton make it through to their respective semi-finals but Tottenham Hotspur and Manchester United are knocked out of the UEFA Cup. Spurs have Steve Perryman sent off in their goalless draw with Real Madrid (0–1 aggregate) and United lose on penalties to Videoton.

23 March 1985: Osvaldo Ardiles marks his first appearance of the season with the opening goal in Tottenham Hotspur's 5–1 win over Southampton. Everton beat Arsenal 2–0 to virtually extinguish the Gunners' waning championship hopes. Hat-tricks for Manchester United's Mark Hughes against Aston Villa and John Wark for Liverpool at West Bromwich Albion. In the Second Division, Oxford United move up to second with a 3–0 win over leaders Manchester City.

24 March 1985: Norwich City win the Milk Cup. The significant action takes place in the space of five minutes at the start of the second half as Gordon Chisholm deflects an Asa Hartford shot into his own net for the only goal and Sunderland's Clive Walker misses a penalty.

30 March 1985: Two goals by reserve midfielder Kevin Richardson give Everton a 2–1 win at Southampton which takes them three points clear of Tottenham Hotspur, who lose 2–0 at home to Aston Villa. Manchester City's lead in the Second Division is cut to two points after a 2–2 draw with bottom club Cardiff City. Oxford United, Birmingham City and Blackburn Rovers all win while Portsmouth draw at Shrewsbury Town.

31 March 1985: Manchester United stay in the championship race as a Frank Stapleton header gives them a 1–0 win at Liverpool.

2 April 1985: Watford rout West Ham United 5–0 in an important game at the foot of the First Division. In the Second Division, Gordon Owen scores a hat-trick as Barnsley beat Oxford United 3–0.

3 April 1985: In a match touted as the "title decider," Everton beat Tottenham Hotspur 2–1 at White Hart Lane. Andy Gray and Trevor Steven score in each half to put Everton in control before Graham Roberts pulls a goal back. Neville Southall denies the home side a point with a breathtaking late save from Mark Falco. The win takes Everton four points clear with two matches in hand on Manchester United who leapfrog Spurs into second after a 2–1 win over Leicester City. Ian Rush scores after 52 seconds to set Liverpool on course for a 3–0 win at Sunderland.

6 April 1985: Everton come from behind to beat Sunderland 4–1 and maintain their lead on the chasing pack. Manchester United hammer Stoke City 5–0 but Tottenham Hotspur are held to a 1–1 draw at West Ham United. Oxford United go top of Division Two on goal difference thanks to a 2–0 win at Cardiff City in which leading scorer John Aldridge bags his 27th goal of the season.

8 April 1985: Sunderland drop into the relegation zone following their goalless draw with Newcastle United and away victories for Ipswich Town and Luton Town. West Ham United are drawn further into the mire after a 4–2 defeat at Queens Park Rangers. In the Second Division, Portsmouth move up to second by winning 3–1 at Fulham as Manchester City are beaten at home by Leeds United.

9 April 1985: Manchester United suffer a major setback in their pursuit of leaders Everton as they slip to a 1–0 defeat at Sheffield Wednesday.

10 April 1985: Liverpool virtually book their place in next month's European Cup final with a 4–0 win over Panathinaikos. In the Cup Winners' Cup, Everton come away from the first leg of their semi-final against Bayern Munich with an encouraging goalless draw.

13 April 1985: FA Cup holders Everton reach the final by beating Luton Town 2–1 at Villa Park. An 85th minute Kevin Sheedy free kick cancels out Ricky Hill's first half strike and Derek Mountfield scores the winner near the end of extra time. In the other semi-final at Goodison Park, Liverpool twice come from behind to take Manchester United to a replay. The situation at the foot of the First Division tightens further with Sunderland's 1–0 win at Coventry City the most notable result. In Division Two, a David Geddis hat-trick helps Birmingham City to a 3–1 win at Fratton Park which lifts the Blues above Pompey into second.

16 April 1985: Cambridge United suffer a second successive relegation following a 2–1 defeat at Millwall. The U's have won only seven league matches in total since the start of last season.

17 April 1985: Manchester United beat Liverpool 2–1 in a stirring FA Cup semi-final replay at Maine Road. Tottenham Hotspur's lingering title hopes suffer another blow as Arsenal beat them 2–0 at White Hart Lane, Spurs' fourth defeat in their last five home matches.

20 April 1985: Leaders Everton beat bottom side Stoke City 2–0 at the Victoria Ground. The result confirms the Potters' relegation having accumulated just three wins and 17 points from 35 league matches. Tottenham Hotspur lose at home again, 3–2 to Ipswich Town. Barely two years after almost going out of business, Oxford United stand on the brink of promotion to the First Division after beating Oldham Athletic 5–2 with John Aldridge scoring a hat-trick.

21 April 1985: Luton Town climb out of the relegation zone with a 2–1 win over Manchester United. Both of their goals are scored by Mick Harford.

23 April 1985: Bradford City win 4–0 at Cambridge United to clinch promotion from the Third Division while Hull City look like joining them following a 4–1 win at Preston North End that gives them a cushion of 11 points over fourth-placed Bristol City.

24 April 1985: A Mark Lawrenson goal in Greece completes a comfortable 5–0 aggregate win for Liverpool over Panathinaikos in the European Cup. Their opponents in next month's final will be Italian champions Juventus. Everton reach their first European final with a 3–1 win over Bayern Munich at Goodison Park in the Cup Winners' Cup. Oxford United beat Shrewsbury Town 1–0 and are promoted to the First Division.

27 April 1985: Everton beat Norwich City 3–0 and need only five points from their remaining seven matches to be certain of the title. Coventry City boost their survival hopes with a 2–1 win over West Bromwich Albion but Sunderland remain in deep trouble despite holding Manchester United to a 2–2 draw at Old Trafford. Norman Whiteside misses a penalty. At Stamford Bridge, Chelsea introduce their new "electric fence" aimed at combating hooliganism. They draw 1–1 with Tottenham Hotspur and the fence is not switched on. Birmingham City's 1–0 win at Barnsley puts them on the verge of an immediate return to the First Division but the third promotion spot is still up for grabs. Blackburn Rovers lose 1–0 at Charlton Athletic so Manchester City move into the driving seat with a 2–1 win at Portsmouth while Leeds United keep their faint hopes alive by beating Oxford United 1–0.

4 May 1985: Many promotion and relegation issues remain undecided on the penultimate Saturday of the League season. In the First Division, six of the bottom seven lose, the exception being Luton Town who beat Arsenal 3–1. Sunderland look doomed following a 4–0 home defeat by Aston Villa. Birmingham City and Hull City confirm their promotions while Darlington are poised to join Chesterfield, Bury and Blackpool in going up from the Fourth Division.

6 May 1985: Everton beat Queens Park Rangers 2–0 in front of over 50,000 at Goodison Park and are league champions for the first time since 1970. Sunderland lose 2–0 at Leicester City and are relegated. Wolverhampton Wanderers go down to the Third Division despite beating Huddersfield Town 2–1 in front of a crowd of 4,422, the lowest ever for a league match at Molineux. The second half at Notts County is delayed by half an hour as Manchester City fans riot with their team 3–0 behind. County eventually run out 3–2 winners to improve their chances of avoiding relegation and deal a blow to City's promotion hopes.

11 May 1985: A black day for English football. Fifty-six people are burnt to death and more than 200 others injured at Valley Parade, Bradford in a fire caused by a discarded cigarette which set light to waste beneath the wooden main stand. The speed with which the blaze spread was astonishing. Tragedy also at Birmingham City where rioting Leeds United fans hold up play and later cause the collapse of a brick wall, killing a 15-year-old boy. Manchester City beat Charlton Athletic 5–1 and clinch promotion to the First Division ahead of Portsmouth on goal difference while at the other end Notts County and Cardiff City are relegated. Oxford United secure the Second Division title with a 4–0 win over Barnsley. Millwall are promoted from the Third Division but Preston North End and Orient go down to be joined by either Swansea City or Burnley. Everton's unbeaten run of 28 league and cup matches comes to end as they go down to a Garry Birtles goal at Nottingham Forest.

14 May 1985: Norwich City win 2–1 at Chelsea in their final match of the season, meaning Coventry City – held 0–0 at Ipswich Town – must win their remaining three matches to stay up and send the Canaries or West Ham United down instead.

15 May 1985: Everton lift the European Cup Winners' Cup with a 3–1 win over Rapid Vienna in Rotterdam. Second half goals from Sharp, Steven and Sheedy clinch their second trophy of the season and keep alive hopes of a "treble" with the FA Cup final to follow.

17 May 1985: West Ham United secure their First Division status with a 1–0 win at Ipswich Town while Coventry City win by the same score at Stoke City to retain a chance of survival. Swansea City hold Bristol City to a goalless draw, a result which relegates Burnley to the Fourth Division.

18 May 1985: Manchester United win the FA Cup for the sixth time, beating Everton 1–0 thanks to a goal by Norman Whiteside in extra time. United played with only 10 men following the 77th minute dismissal of defender Kevin Moran for a foul on Peter Reid, the first ever sending-off in an FA Cup final.

20 May 1985: After sinking as low as 20th earlier in the season, Liverpool clinch the runners-up spot with a 3–0 win at West Ham United in their penultimate League match.

23 May 1985: An 84th-minute goal by Brian Kilcline gives Coventry City a dramatic 1–0 win over Luton and edges them closer to First Division safety. Everton beat Liverpool 1–0, their third such win over the deposed champions this season. John Wark misses a penalty.

26 May 1985: Coventry City beat Everton 4–1 to complete their "great escape." Milk Cup winners Norwich City are relegated despite finishing on 49 points, the highest total ever recorded by a team relegated from the top flight.

28 May 1985: Luton Town beat an understrength Everton 2–0 in the final match of the League season.

29 May 1985: Thirty-nine spectators, most of them Italian, are killed when a wall collapses at the European Cup final between Liverpool and Juventus at the Heysel Stadium in Brussels. Despite the tragedy, the match is played and Michel Platini scores from a penalty as Juventus win 1–0. UEFA later bans all English clubs indefinitely from European competitions as a result of the disaster. Just hours before kick-off, Joe Fagan had announced that he would be retiring as Liverpool manager after two seasons in charge.

== FA Cup ==
Manchester United won their second FA Cup in three years after a Norman Whiteside goal gave them an extra-time 1–0 victory over Everton at Wembley. Defender Kevin Moran became the first player to be sent off in an FA Cup final at Wembley when he brought down Peter Reid with what he insisted was a misjudged tackle. United's triumph ended Everton's hopes of completing a treble of trophies – they had already lifted the league title and UEFA Cup Winners Cup. Millwall fans rioted in their sixth round match against Luton Town, causing Luton to ban away fans from their ground. Non-League Telford United collected four League scalps on their way to the fifth round proper, the joint-best run by a non-league side until Lincoln City reached the quarter-finals in 2016-17.

== League Cup ==
Norwich City became the first club to win a major trophy in a relegation season as they lifted the League Cup after beating Sunderland, who went down with them to the Second Division. This occurrence would not be repeated for some 26 years when Birmingham City suffered the same fate; also relegated after lifting the League Cup earlier in the season.

== Football League ==
=== First Division ===
Everton won their first league title for fifteen years with five matches to spare, and also won the European Cup Winners' Cup to claim their first ever European trophy, but were denied a treble when they lost to Manchester United in the final of the FA Cup. Liverpool endured their first trophyless season for a decade, although they did finish runners-up in the league, reached the FA Cup semi-finals and were on the losing side in the European Cup final - a match marred by a riot before kick-off in which 39 spectators died following the collapse of a wall. The British government swiftly banned all English clubs from competing in the following season's European competitions, before UEFA placed an indefinite ban on English clubs playing in Europe and ordered Liverpool to serve an extra three years when the ban on other clubs was lifted.

Tottenham Hotspur enjoyed another good season, topping the First Division over Christmas before finishing third in the final table. Southampton continued to compete with the bigger clubs and finished fifth. Newly promoted Chelsea, Sheffield Wednesday and Newcastle United enjoyed a strong return to the First Division, finishing sixth, eighth and 14th respectively.

Stoke City went down in bottom place with one of the worst First Division records ever - a mere three wins from 42 games and 17 points from a possible 126. Sunderland, runners-up in the League Cup, had a dismal season in the league and were relegated in second place from bottom. Norwich City went down with 49 points (a record total for a relegated First Division side) but the blow was cushioned by victory in the League Cup. QPR, who had finished fifth a year earlier, avoided relegation by one place and one point. Player-manager Frank Sibley was dismissed after one season to be replaced by Jim Smith of Oxford United. Ipswich Town's decline since the departure of Bobby Robson to the England job three years earlier continued as the Suffolk club finished 17th, with most of Robson's fine team now gone.

Pos	Team	Pld	W	D	L	GF	GA	GD	Pts	Qualification or relegation
1	Everton (C)	42	28	6	8	88	43	+45	90	Qualified for the Football League Super Cup and disqualified from the European Cup
2	Liverpool	42	22	11	9	68	35	+33	77	Qualified for the Football League Super Cup and disqualified from the UEFA Cup
3	Tottenham Hotspur	42	23	8	11	78	51	+27	77	Qualified for the Football League Super Cup and disqualified from the UEFA Cup
4	Manchester United (Note: Manchester United would have qualified for the Cup Winners' Cup as FA Cup winners.)	42	22	10	10	77	47	+30	76	Qualified for the Football League Super Cup and disqualified from the European Cup Winners' Cup
5	Southampton	42	19	11	12	56	47	+9	68	Qualified for the Football League Super Cup and disqualified from the UEFA Cup
6	Chelsea	42	18	12	12	63	48	+15	66	
7	Arsenal	42	19	9	14	61	49	+12	66	
8	Sheffield Wednesday	42	17	14	11	58	45	+13	65	
9	Nottingham Forest	42	19	7	16	56	48	+8	64	
10	Aston Villa	42	15	11	16	60	60	0	56	
11	Watford	42	14	13	15	81	71	+10	55	
12	West Bromwich Albion	42	16	7	19	58	62	−4	55	
13	Luton Town	42	15	9	18	57	61	−4	54	
14	Newcastle United	42	13	13	16	55	70	−15	52	
15	Leicester City	42	15	6	21	65	73	−8	51	
16	West Ham United	42	13	12	17	51	68	−17	51	
17	Ipswich Town	42	13	11	18	46	57	−11	50	
18	Coventry City	42	15	5	22	47	64	−17	50	
19	Queens Park Rangers	42	13	11	18	53	72	−19	50	
20	Norwich City (Note: Norwich City would have qualified for the UEFA Cup as League Cup winners.) (R)	42	13	10	19	46	64	−18	49	Qualified for the Football League Super Cup and disqualified from the UEFA Cup and relegated to the Second Division
21	Sunderland (R)	42	10	10	22	40	62	−22	40	Relegation to the Second Division
22	Stoke City (R)	42	3	8	31	24	91	−67	17	Relegation to the Second Division

Source: World Football
Rules for classification: 1) Points; 2) Goal difference; 3) Goals scored
(C) Champions; (R) Relegated

=== Second Division ===
Twenty-three years after joining the Football League, Oxford United reached the First Division by clinching the Second Division title and securing a second successive promotion. The only downside to their promotion was the departure soon afterwards of manager Jim Smith to QPR, leaving Maurice Evans to try to build an Oxford side capable of defying the odds and surviving at the highest level. Birmingham City achieved an instant return to the First Division after keeping faith in manager Ron Saunders, while Manchester City won promotion on goal difference ahead of Portsmouth. Blackburn Rovers, absent from the First Division since 1966, missed out on promotion by a single point, while just two points denied Brighton & Hove Albion promotion.

Wimbledon, in their first season as a Second Division club and only their eighth in the Football League, finished a secure 12th.

Notts County and debt-ridden Wolverhampton Wanderers suffered second successive relegations, while Cardiff City returned to the Third Division after just two years. Middlesbrough, another club faced with mounting debts, narrowly avoided relegation to the Third Division for the first time in twenty years.

Pos	Team	Pld	W	D	L	GF	GA	GD	Pts	Relegation
1	Oxford United (C, P)	42	25	9	8	84	36	+48	84	Promotion to the First Division
2	Birmingham City (P)	42	25	7	10	59	33	+26	82	Promotion to the First Division
3	Manchester City (P)	42	21	11	10	66	40	+26	74	Promotion to the First Division
4	Portsmouth	42	20	14	8	69	50	+19	74	
5	Blackburn Rovers	42	21	10	11	66	41	+25	73	
6	Brighton & Hove Albion	42	20	12	10	54	34	+20	72	
7	Leeds United	42	19	12	11	66	43	+23	69	
8	Shrewsbury Town	42	18	11	13	66	53	+13	65	
9	Fulham	42	19	8	15	68	64	+4	65	
10	Grimsby Town	42	18	8	16	72	64	+8	62	
11	Barnsley	42	14	16	12	42	42	0	58	
12	Wimbledon	42	16	10	16	71	75	−4	58	
13	Huddersfield Town	42	15	10	17	52	64	−12	55	
14	Oldham Athletic	42	15	8	19	49	67	−18	53	
15	Crystal Palace	42	12	12	18	46	65	−19	48	
16	Carlisle United	42	13	8	21	50	67	−17	47	
17	Charlton Athletic	42	11	12	19	51	63	−12	45	
18	Sheffield United	42	10	14	18	54	66	−12	44	
19	Middlesbrough	42	10	10	22	41	57	−16	40	
20	Notts County (R)	42	10	7	25	45	73	−28	37	Relegation to the Third Division
21	Cardiff City (R)	42	9	8	25	47	79	−32	35	Relegation to the Third Division
22	Wolverhampton Wanderers (R)	42	8	9	25	37	79	−42	33	Relegation to the Third Division

Rules for classification: 1) Points; 2) Goal difference; 3) Goals scored
(C) Champions; (P) Promoted; (R) Relegated

=== Third Division ===
Bradford City's promotion glory and Third Division title triumph ended in tragedy with the death of 56 spectators in a stadium fire on the final day of the season at home to Lincoln City. The second promotion place went to Millwall, who had a happy end to the season just weeks after they had made the headlines for all the wrong reasons after hundreds of their fans ran riot in an FA Cup tie at Luton Town. The last promotion place was sealed by Hull City, while Gillingham and Bristol City just missed out.

Derby County failed to mount a serious challenge for an immediate return to the Second Division, although their seventh-place finish was hardly disastrous. Newly promoted York City finished eighth in the league but made headlines in the FA Cup by beating Arsenal in the fourth round and taking Liverpool to a replay in the fifth.

In an era where consecutive relegations were a regular event, Cambridge United were rooted to the bottom of the Third Division with just four wins, 21 points and a joint league record of 33 defeats. Orient also went down, but the biggest news at the lower end of this division was the relegation of Preston North End and Burnley to the Fourth Division for the very first time - an incredible low for two clubs with a host of league titles and FA Cup wins to their name, with Burnley's most recent title win coming as recently as 1960, although Preston's only two league titles had come in the league's first two seasons nearly a century earlier and their last FA Cup win was in 1938.

Debt-ridden Swansea City, who had finished sixth in the First Division in 1982, narrowly avoided a third successive relegation.

Pos	Team	Pld	W	D	L	GF	GA	GD	Pts	Promotion or relegation
1	Bradford City (C, P)	46	28	10	8	77	45	+32	94 (Note: Bradford City v. Lincoln City was abandoned after 40 mins; the result (0–0) stood.)	Promotion to the Second Division
2	Millwall (P)	46	26	12	8	73	42	+31	90	Promotion to the Second Division
3	Hull City (P)	46	25	12	9	78	49	+29	87	Promotion to the Second Division
4	Gillingham	46	25	8	13	80	62	+18	83	
5	Bristol City	46	24	9	13	74	47	+27	81	
6	Bristol Rovers	46	21	12	13	66	48	+18	75	
7	Derby County	46	19	13	14	65	54	+11	70	
8	York City	46	20	9	17	70	57	+13	69	
9	Reading	46	19	12	15	68	62	+6	69	
10	Bournemouth	46	19	11	16	57	46	+11	68	
11	Walsall	46	18	13	15	58	52	+6	67	
12	Rotherham United	46	18	11	17	55	55	0	65	
13	Brentford	46	16	14	16	62	64	−2	62	
14	Doncaster Rovers	46	17	8	21	72	74	−2	59	
15	Plymouth Argyle	46	15	14	17	62	65	−3	59	
16	Wigan Athletic	46	15	14	17	60	64	−4	59	
17	Bolton Wanderers	46	16	6	24	69	75	−6	54	
18	Newport County	46	13	13	20	55	67	−12	52	
19	Lincoln City	46	11	18	17	50	51	−1	51	
20	Swansea City	46	12	11	23	53	80	−27	47	
21	Burnley (R)	46	11	13	22	60	73	−13	46	Relegation to the Fourth Division
22	Orient (R)	46	11	13	22	51	76	−25	46	Relegation to the Fourth Division
23	Preston North End (R)	46	13	7	26	51	100	−49	46	Relegation to the Fourth Division
24	Cambridge United (R)	46	4	9	33	37	95	−58	21	Relegation to the Fourth Division

(C) Champions; (P) Promoted; (R) Relegated

=== Fourth Division ===
Chesterfield sealed the Fourth Division title, with the runners-up spot going to a Blackpool side who had recently been saved from closure. Former Tottenham Hotspur star Cyril Knowles achieved his first success as a manager by guiding Darlington to promotion in third place, while the last promotion spot went to Bury, who finished seven points ahead of Hereford United.

Torquay United, Northampton Town, Stockport County and Halifax Town propped up the Fourth Division but were re-elected to the League.

Pos	Team	Pld	W	D	L	GF	GA	GD	Pts	Promotion
1	Chesterfield (C, P)	46	26	13	7	64	35	+29	91	Promotion to the Third Division
2	Blackpool (P)	46	24	14	8	73	39	+34	86	Promotion to the Third Division
3	Darlington (P)	46	24	13	9	66	49	+17	85	Promotion to the Third Division
4	Bury (P)	46	24	12	10	76	50	+26	84	Promotion to the Third Division
5	Hereford United	46	22	11	13	65	47	+18	77	
6	Tranmere Rovers	46	24	3	19	83	66	+17	75	
7	Colchester United	46	20	14	12	87	65	+22	74	
8	Swindon Town	46	21	9	16	62	58	+4	72	
9	Scunthorpe United	46	19	14	13	83	62	+21	71	
10	Crewe Alexandra	46	18	12	16	65	69	−4	66	
11	Peterborough United	46	16	14	16	54	53	+1	62	
12	Port Vale	46	14	18	14	61	59	+2	60	
13	Aldershot	46	17	8	21	56	63	−7	59	
14	Mansfield Town	46	13	18	15	41	38	+3	57	
15	Wrexham	46	15	9	22	67	70	−3	54	
16	Chester City	46	15	9	22	60	72	−12	54	
17	Rochdale	46	13	14	19	55	69	−14	53	
18	Exeter City	46	13	14	19	57	79	−22	53	
19	Hartlepool United	46	14	10	22	54	67	−13	52	
20	Southend United	46	13	11	22	58	83	−25	50	
21	Halifax Town	46	15	5	26	42	69	−27	50	Re-elected
22	Stockport County	46	13	8	25	58	79	−21	47	Re-elected
23	Northampton Town	46	14	5	27	53	74	−21	47	Re-elected
24	Torquay United	46	9	14	23	38	63	−25	41	Re-elected

(C) Champions; (P) Promoted

=== Top goalscorers ===
First Division

- Kerry Dixon (Chelsea) and Gary Lineker (Leicester City) – 24 goals

Second Division

- John Aldridge (Oxford United) – 30 goals

Third Division

- Tommy Tynan (Plymouth Argyle) – 31 goals

Fourth Division

- John Clayton (Tranmere Rovers) – 31 goals

== Non-league football ==
The divisional champions of the major non-League competitions were:

Competition	Winners
Alliance Premier League	Wealdstone
Isthmian League	Sutton United
Northern Premier League	Stafford Rangers
Southern League	Cheltenham Town
FA Trophy	Wealdstone
FA Vase	Halesowen Town

== Awards ==
- Everton's team included PFA Players' Player of the Year Peter Reid and FWA Footballer of the Year Neville Southall.
- PFA Young Player of the Year was Manchester United's Welsh striker Mark Hughes, who helped his side lift the FA Cup.

== Notable managers ==
- Howard Kendall brought glory to Everton as they lifted the league championship trophy and the Cup Winners' Cup.
- Ron Atkinson won his second FA Cup in three years with Manchester United.
- Jim Smith brought First Division football to Oxford United less than a quarter of a century after they were elected to the league.
- Ken Brown guided Norwich City to League Cup glory which compensated for their relegation to the Second Division.
- Howard Wilkinson guided newly promoted Sheffield Wednesday to seventh place in the First Division in their first top division season for more than a decade.
- Ron Saunders took Birmingham City back into the First Division at the first time of asking.
- Trevor Cherry guided Bradford City to Third Division championship glory.
- Former Arsenal player George Graham achieved managerial success with Millwall as they won promotion to the Second Division.
- Brian Horton took Hull City to promotion in the Third Division.
- Cyril Knowles (who played for Tottenham in the late 1960s and early 1970s), enjoyed success in management by getting Darlington promoted to the Third Division.

== Notable debutants ==
25 August 1984: Dale Gordon, 17-year-old winger, makes his debut for Norwich City in a 3–3 draw with Liverpool at Carrow Road in the First Division.

26 December 1984: Nigel Clough, 18-year-old striker and son of manager Brian Clough, makes his debut for Nottingham Forest in a 2–0 home win over Ipswich Town in the First Division.

23 March 1985: Martin Allen, 19-year-old midfielder, makes his debut for Queen's Park Rangers in a 2–0 away defeat against Luton Town in the First Division.

13 April 1985: Paul Gascoigne, 17-year-old midfielder, makes his debut for Newcastle United in a 1-0 First Division home win over Queen's Park Rangers.

20 April 1985: Tony Daley, 17-year-old winger, makes his debut for Aston Villa in a 0-2 First Division defeat at Southampton.

11 May 1985: Dennis Wise, 18-year-old winger, makes his debut for Wimbledon in 2–1 home win over Cardiff City in the Second Division.

== Deaths ==
- 14 August 1984 – Mike Barrett, 24, Bristol Rovers winger. Died as a result of cancer.
- 6 November 1984 – Micky Cave, 35, former Torquay United, AFC Bournemouth and York City midfielder. Died from accidental carbon monoxide poisoning.
- 27 December 1984 - Leslie Compton, 72, who played senior football and cricket between 1930 and 1956, died from a diabetes related illness. He spent his entire footballing career at Arsenal and was capped twice for England in 1950 at the age of 38.
- 9 March 1985 - Harry Catterick, 65, manager of Everton from 1961 to 1973, during which time they won two league titles and an FA Cup. Died from a heart attack at Goodison Park after watching Everton draw 2–2 with Ipswich Town in the quarter-final of the FA Cup.
