= 1983–84 Arsenal F.C. season =

English football club season

Arsenal F.C.
1983–84 season
- Chairman: Peter Hill-Wood
- Manager: Terry Neill (to 16 December); Don Howe (caretaker manager)
- First Division: 6th
- FA Cup: Third round
- League Cup: Fourth round
- Top goalscorer: League: Tony Woodcock (21); All: Tony Woodcock (22)
Home colours	Away colours

The 1983–84 season was Arsenal Football Club's 58th consecutive season in the top flight of English football. Arsenal finished sixth in the Football League First Division.

Charlie Nicholas was brought to Arsenal from Celtic. However, he did not immediately perform. Paul Mariner was also bought to bolster the club in the latter half of the season. Tony Woodcock remained Arsenal's top scorer. Graham Rix assumed the captaincy from David O'Leary.

Arsenal were knocked out of the League Cup at home by Walsall. After a run of dismal league results including five losses in six games, manager Terry Neill was sacked on 16 December 1983. He was succeeded by his assistant Don Howe.

== Season summary ==
The 1983-84 season was Terry Neill’s final season as the Gunners manager. Neill had persuaded Scottish starlet Charlie Nicholas to spurn the advances of Liverpool and move to London in time for the 1983-84 season in a club-record signing from Celtic. Nicholas cost £650,000 and was reportedly the highest paid footballer in Britain. The move wasn’t an immediate success, however, and by December Nicholas had only scored twice.

Arsenal were knocked out of the League Cup at home by Walsall, a repeat of Wallsall's giant-killing act of 1933. Terry Neill, already under pressure due to early losses to Manchester United and Liverpool at home, had overseen a series of inconsistent results in the league. With Arsenal 16th in the table, a 1-0 loss at home to West Bromwich Albion led to "Neill Out" demonstrations by the supporters outside the ground. After Arsenal lost 3-1 away at West Ham, on 16 December 1983 the club did the inevitable and sacked Neill.

Don Howe first became caretaker-manager, and became permanent manager after the game against Leicester on 28 April 1984, following a run of five wins and two draws in the last seven games. Arsenal were 6th – the highest position they had held that season after the second match of the season. Howe also brought Paul Mariner to Highbury in February 1984 for £150,000. Mariner scored seven times in the final fifteen games of the season.

== Squad ==
Note: Flags indicate national team as defined under FIFA eligibility rules; some limited exceptions apply. Players may hold more than one non-FIFA nationality.

Pos.	Nation	Player
GK	NIR	Pat Jennings
DF	NIR	Colin Hill
DF	ENG	Kenny Sansom
MF	ENG	Brian Talbot
DF	IRL	David O'Leary
DF	ENG	Tommy Caton
MF	ENG	Stewart Robson
MF	ENG	Paul Davis
FW	SCO	Charlie Nicholas
FW	ENG	Tony Woodcock
MF	ENG	Graham Rix

Pos.	Nation	Player
FW	ENG	Paul Mariner
DF	ENG	Chris Whyte
FW	ENG	Alan Sunderland
FW	ENG	Raphael Meade
MF	ENG	Ian Allinson
MF	ENG	Brian McDermott
DF	ENG	John Kay
FW	ENG	David Cork
GK	ENG	John Lukic
FW	ENG	Lee Chapman
DF	ENG	Tony Adams
MF	ENG	Dave Madden
DF	ENG	Brian Sparrow
MF	IRL	Paul Gorman

== Top scorers ==
=== First Division ===
- (England) Tony Woodcock 21
- (Scotland) Charlie Nicholas 11
- (England) Paul Mariner 7
- (England) Brian Talbot 6
- (England) Stewart Robson 6

== Results ==
=== First Division ===
Pos	Team	Pld	W	D	L	GF	GA	GD	Pts	Qualification or relegation
4	Manchester United	42	20	14	8	71	41	+30	74	Qualification for the UEFA Cup first round
5	Queens Park Rangers	42	22	7	13	67	37	+30	73	Qualification for the UEFA Cup first round
6	Arsenal	42	18	9	15	74	60	+14	63	
7	Everton	42	16	14	12	44	42	+2	62	Qualification for the European Cup Winners' Cup first round (Note: Everton qualified for the European Cup Winners' Cup as the 1983–84 FA Cup winners.)
8	Tottenham Hotspur	42	17	10	15	64	65	−1	61	Qualification for the UEFA Cup first round (Note: Tottenham Hotspur qualified for the UEFA Cup as the 1983–84 UEFA Cup winners.)

Source: World Football
Rules for classification: 1) Points; 2) Goal difference; 3) Goals scored
Notes:

27 August 1983 1	Arsenal	2–1	Luton Town	London
	Woodcock; McDermott		Robson (o.g.)	Stadium: Highbury

29 August 1983 2	Wolverhampton Wanderers	1–2	Arsenal	Wolverhampton
	Clarke 3'		Nicholas (2) 25', pen 81'	Stadium: Molineux

3 September 1983 3	Southampton	1–0	Arsenal	Southampton
	Baird			Stadium: The Dell

6 September 1983 4	Arsenal	2–3	Manchester United	London
	Woodcock 3', Talbot 88'		Moran 8', Stapleton 14', B. Robson 40'	Stadium: Highbury

10 September 1983 5	Arsenal	0–2	Liverpool	London
			Johnston 17'; Dalglish 67'	Stadium: Highbury

17 September 1983 6	Notts County	0–4	Arsenal	Nottingham
			Rix 1'; Hunt (o.g.) 42'; Talbot 48'; Woodcock 83'	Stadium: Meadow Lane

24 September 1983 7	Arsenal	3–0	Norwich City	London
	Chapman; Sunderland (2)			Stadium: Highbury

1 October 1983 8	Queen's Park Rangers	2–0	Arsenal	London
	Gregory; Neill			Stadium: Loftus Road

15 October 1983 9	Arsenal	0–1	Coventry City	London
			Bamber	Stadium: Highbury

22 October 1983 10	Arsenal	4–1	Nottingham Forest	London
	Sunderland 7'; Hill 23'; Woodcock (2) 66', 76'		Davenport pen 64'	Stadium: Highbury

29 October 1983 11	Aston Villa	2–6	Arsenal	Birmingham
	Morley; Evans pen		Woodcock (5); McDermott	Stadium: Villa Park

5 November 1983 12	Arsenal	1–2	Sunderland	London
	Woodcock 59'		West 3'; Atkins 56'	Stadium: Highbury

12 November 1983 13	Ipswich Town	1–0	Arsenal	Ipswich
	Gates			Stadium: Portman Road

19 November 1983 14	Arsenal	2–1	Everton	London
	Sunderland 29'; Robson 35'		King pen 41'	Stadium: Highbury

26 November 1983 15	Leicester City	3–0	Arsenal	Leicester
	Lineker; Lynex; A. Smith			Stadium: Filbert Street

3 December 1983 16	Arsenal	0–1	West Bromwich Albion	London
			Monaghan	Stadium: Highbury

10 December 1983 17	West Ham United	3–1	Arsenal	London
	Brooking; Whyte (o.g.); Pike		Whyte	Stadium: Upton Park

17 December 1983 18	Arsenal	3–1	Watford	London
	Meade (3)		Johnston	Stadium: Highbury

26 December 1983 19	Tottenham Hotspur	2–4	Arsenal	London
	Roberts 37'; Archibald 50'		Nicholas (2) 26', 49'; Meade (2) 74', 86'	Stadium: White Hart Lane

27 December 1983 20	Arsenal	1–1	Birmingham City	London
	Nicholas (pen)		Hopkins	Stadium: Highbury

31 December 1983 21	Arsenal	2–2	Southampton	London
	Cork; Nicholas pen		Moran (2)	Stadium: Highbury

2 January 1984 22	Norwich City	1–1	Arsenal	Norwich
	Deehan		Woodcock	Stadium: Carrow Road

14 January 1984 23	Luton Town	1–2	Arsenal	Luton
	Kay (o.g.)		Sansom; Woodcock	Stadium: Kenilworth Road

21 January 1984 24	Arsenal	1–1	Notts County	London
	Nicholas 16'		Chiedozie 57'	Stadium: Highbury

28 January 1984 25	Stoke City	1–0	Arsenal	Stoke-on-Trent
	Maguire (pen) 75'			Stadium: Victoria Ground

4 February 1984 26	Arsenal	0–2	Queen's Park Rangers	London
			Stewart; Fenwick	Stadium: Highbury

11 February 1984 27	Liverpool	2–1	Arsenal	Liverpool
	Kennedy 12'; Neal 78'		Rix 45'	Stadium: Anfield

18 February 1984 28	Arsenal	1–1	Aston Villa	London
	Rix		Evans pen	Stadium: Highbury

25 February 1984 29	Nottingham Forest	0–1	Arsenal	Nottingham
			Mariner 88'	Stadium: City Ground

3 March 1984 30	Sunderland	2–2	Arsenal	Sunderland
	Proctor 7'; Rowell pen 89'		Nicholas pen 11'; Woodcock 46'	Stadium: Roker Park

10 March 1984 31	Arsenal	4–1	Ipswich Town	London
	Mariner (2); Talbot; Woodcock		Gates	Stadium: Highbury

17 March 1984 32	Manchester United	4–0	Arsenal	Manchester
	Mühren (2) pen 10', 44'; Stapleton 63'; B. Robson 89'			Stadium: Old Trafford

24 March 1984 33	Arsenal	4–1	Wolverhampton Wanderers	London
	Woodcock 26'; Rix 34'; Nicholas pen 60'; Robson 84'		McGarvey 71'	Stadium: Highbury

31 March 1984 34	Coventry City	1–4	Arsenal	Coventry
	Bennett		Whyte; Robson; Talbot; Mariner	Stadium: Highfield Road

7 April 1984 35	Arsenal	3–1	Stoke City	London
	Nicholas; Mariner; Woodcock		Chamberlain 70'	Stadium: Highbury

9 April 1984 36	Everton	0–0	Arsenal	Liverpool
				Stadium: Goodison Park

21 April 1984 37	Arsenal	3–2	Tottenham Hotspur	London
	Robson; Nicholas; Woodcock		Archibald (2)	Stadium: Highbury

23 April 1984 38	Birmingham City	1–1	Arsenal	Birmingham
	Kuhl		Woodcock	Stadium: St Andrew's

28 April 1984 39	Arsenal	2–1	Leicester City	London
	Woodcock; Davis		Lineker	Stadium: Highbury

5 May 1984 40	West Bromwich Albion	1–3	Arsenal	West Bromwich
	Thompson		Talbot; Mariner; Robson	Stadium: The Hawthorns

7 May 1984 41	Arsenal	3–3	West Ham United	London
	Talbot; Woodcock; Mariner		Whitton (2); Hilton	Stadium: Highbury

12 May 1984 42	Watford	2–1	Arsenal	London
	Johnston; Reilly		Robson	Stadium: Vicarage Road

=== Football League Cup ===
4 October 1983 Second round (1st Leg)	Plymouth Argyle	1–1	Arsenal	Plymouth
				Stadium: Home Park

25 October 1983 Second round (2nd Leg)	Arsenal	1–0 (2–1 agg.)	Plymouth Argyle	London
				Stadium: Highbury

9 November 1983 Third round	Tottenham Hotspur	1–2	Arsenal	London
				Stadium: White Hart Lane

29 November 1983 Fourth round	Arsenal	1–2	Walsall	London
				Stadium: Highbury

=== FA Cup ===
Arsenal entered the FA Cup in the third round proper, in which they were drawn to face Middlesbrough.

7 January 1984 Third round	Middlesbrough	3–2	Arsenal	Middlesbrough
	MacDonald 5'; Sugrue 60'; Baxter 70'		Woodcock 13'; Nicholas 64'	Stadium: Ayresome Park; Attendance: 17,813
