= Paul Evans (football manager) =

English footballer and manager

Personal information
- Date of birth: 24 February 1949 (age 77)
- Place of birth: Kiveton Park, England
- Position: Goalkeeper

Senior career*
Years	Team	Apps	(Gls)
197x–19??	Mansfield Town		(0)
198x–1986	Burton Albion		

Managerial career
- 1986–1989: Scarborough (assistant)
- * Club domestic league appearances and goals as of 17:49, 4 July 2008 (UTC)

Paul Evans (born 24 February 1949 in Kiveton Park, England) is an English retired footballer who played as a goalkeeper for Mansfield Town, Boston F.C. and Burton Albion in the 1970s and 1980s. His time with Neil Warnock at Burton began a more than 10-year relationship with Warnock in football. He spent time as assistant manager at Scarborough, then coach at Notts County and Huddersfield Town. Evans is also known at these clubs as "Warnock's mate" and was seen many times in the dressing room calming Warnock down when he became angry.

== Playing career ==
Evans played in goal for Burton Albion in the 1980s and was part of Northern Premier League Challenge Cup winning team.

In 1985, while playing in an FA Cup clash with Leicester City, Evans was struck by a plank of wood thrown from the away end and was knocked out cold. As Evans partially recovered, Neil Warnock's protests for the game to be abandoned were ignored, and Evans had to return to the goal to finish the match. Becoming physically sick at one point, it was clear that he was not right, giving up 6 goals as City won 6–1.

Subsequently, the FA reviewed the game and a replay was played. Evans played in the rematch, and Burton was defeated again, albeit by a much more modest 1–0 score.

Evans left Burton Albion in 1986 to become assistant manager at Scarborough.

== With Neil Warnock ==
=== Burton Albion ===
When Neil Warnock became the Manager of Burton Albion in January 1981, Evans was his goalkeeper and was part of the Northern Premier League Challenge Cup winning team of the 1982–83 season, this is the first time that Evans worked for Warnock. Little did he know that by 1997 he would have worked at Scarborough, Notts County, Huddersfield Town and Plymouth Argyle and won promotion 5 times and won 1 trophy and come runner-up in an Autoglass Trophy Final.

=== Scarborough ===
In 1986, Neil Warnock went to Scarborough as Manager, and he took Evans, his former goalkeeper at Burton Albion, with him as his Assistant Manager. Warnock and Evans arrived at Scarborough and quickly signed Cec Podd, Barry Gallagher and Paul Kendell from Halifax Town, Mike Brolly and Tommy Graham from Scunthorpe United, David Kaye from Chester City and Andy Harrison and Steve Richards from Kettering Town. Warnock also added Stuart Mell who was with Warnock and Evans at Burton Albion. The season started pretty average so Warnock signed Ian Bennyworth and Mitch Cook. With the season still going pretty average; Warnock signed Kevin Blackwell on a months loan from Barnet in November 1986 and this started an upturn in fortunes. After the month's loan ended, Warnock paid Barry Fry's Barnet £2,000 for Blackwell's services. On 13 December Scarborough went top of the league following Barnet's loss to Maidstone United. However, a week after this the club was knocked sideways as the chairman; Barry Adamson died of a heart attack at an FA Trophy game against Morecambe. At one point in April, Scarborough were seven points clear at the top of the GM Vauxhall Conference, and due to Barnet losing at Stafford Rangers Scarborough won the title and were subsequently promoted to the Fourth Division. Basically, Warnock and Evans had brought instant success, with Scarborough winning the Football Conference in 1987. Warnock and Evans remained at Scarborough until they moved on to Notts County in 1989 after Warnock had fallen out with chairman Geoffrey Richmond.

=== Notts County ===
In January 1989, Warnock arrived at Notts County and Warnock took Evans, physio Dave Wilson and Kevin Blackwell with him to Meadow Lane and would signal a start to a successful era at Notts County. Evans joined as part of Warnock's backroom staff which consisted of Johnny Newman(Assistant Manager) and Dave Wilson (Physiotherapist). Then at the end of the 1988–89 season, Johnny Newman left Notts County and Mick Jones joined as Warnock's assistant. County won the 3rd Division Play-off Final in 1990 at Wembley, and as always Evans was on the bench with Warnock.

Then the 2nd Division Play-off Final was won in 1991 and Notts County were subsequently promoted to Division 1 (now The Premiership). However, after only one season County were relegated and Warnock was sacked in January 1993 after two play-off wins.

=== Huddersfield Town ===
Warnock took over at Torquay United in March 1993 and it wasn't until Warnock left Plainmoor in May and then in July 1993 Warnock take over at Huddersfield Town and Evans, Jones (Assistant Manager), Blackwell (Youth Development Officer/Sub Goalkeeper) and Wilson (Physiotherapist) joined him. However the 1993–94 season was a relegation battle from the start but a trip to Wembley Stadium was ensured thanks to the Associate Members Cup where Town appeared in the Final against Swansea City, however Town lost 3–1 on penalties. This season was also the last ever season at Town's stadium Leeds Road and Evans was a small part of this historic season. and the following season (1994–95) Town won two trophies. Early on in the 1994–95 season Town beat Hull City to claim the Yorkshire Electricity Cup which became the first silverware to be lifted at The Kirklees Stadium and the first since Town had won the 1979–80 Fourth Division Championship. Then Warnock's men won the Play-off Final at Wembley on 28 May 1995 against Bristol Rovers with a 2–1 scoreline with Andrew Booth and Chris Billy scoring. However, Warnock resigned 8 days later, so Jones, Blackwell and Evans followed him to Devon, but Dave Wilson stayed on as physiotherapist at Huddersfield Town. Wilson died in 1996 after a long illness that had already forced him to retire earlier on in 1996. Wilson had worked with Warnock and Evans since 1986 when he was physiotherapist with Scarborough, then after Warnock tracked him down in Hong Kong Warnock recruited him to the backroom staff at Notts County and then in 1993 at Huddersfield.

=== Warnock's spat with Bean ===
On the last game of the 2006–07 season, Sheffield United had just been relegated, when Evans's best friend Neil Warnock was manager. He was waiting in Warnock's office with Warnock's tearful wife and son, caused by Sean Bean bursting into Warnock's office, and shouting and swearing at them. When Warnock found out he was livid and wanted to go and find him, but Evans told him not to waste his time, again calming Warnock down.

== Current life ==
Paul Evans now works as a solicitor in Worksop. Evans is still Neil Warnock's best friend.

== Honours ==
=== As a player ===
- 1982–83: Northern Premier League Challenge Cup winner – Burton Albion

=== As a coach ===
- 1986–87: Conference winners (promotion to Division 4) – Scarborough (Assistant Manager)
- 1989–90: Division 3 Playoff winners (promotion to Division 2) – Notts County (Coach)
- 1990–91: Division 2 Playoff winners (promotion to Division 1) – Notts County (Coach)
- 1994–95: Division 2 Playoff winners (promotion to Division 1) – Huddersfield Town (Coach)
- 1993–94: Football League Trophy finalist – Huddersfield Town (Coach)
- 1994–95: Yorkshire Electricity Cup winners – Huddersfield Town (Coach)
- 1995–96: Division 3 Playoff winners (promotion to Division 2) – Plymouth Argyle (Coach)
