= Garry MacDonald =

English footballer (born 1962)

Personal information
- Full name: Garry MacDonald
- Date of birth: 26 March 1962 (age 64)
- Place of birth: Middlesbrough, England
- Height: 6 ft 0 in (1.83 m)
- Position: Forward

Youth career
- 197?–1980: Middlesbrough

Senior career*
Years	Team	Apps	(Gls)
1980–1984	Middlesbrough	53	(5)
1984	Carlisle United	9	(0)
1984–1989	Darlington	162	(35)
1989	Stockport County	1	(0)
1989–1990	Hartlepool United	18	(1)
1990–199?	South Bank		
- * Club domestic league appearances and goals

Garry MacDonald (born 26 March 1962) is an English former footballer who made nearly 250 appearances in the Football League playing as a forward for Middlesbrough, Carlisle United, Darlington, Stockport County and Hartlepool United.

== Life and career ==
MacDonald was born in 1962 in Middlesbrough. He began his football career with Middlesbrough F.C., and made his first-team debut for them on 8 November 1980, aged 18, in the starting eleven for a 1–0 win away to Brighton & Hove Albion in the First Division. He made 16 appearances over his first two seasons, at the end of which Middlesbrough were relegated to the Second Division. He went on to make 61 appearances before being released in 1984.

He began the 1984–85 season with another Second Division club, Carlisle United, before moving on in October to Darlington of the Fourth Division under the management of Cyril Knowles. He made 33 league appearances as the team gained promotion to the Third Division, and played in all six of their FA Cup ties and scored in the third-round replay as Darlington eliminated his former club Middlesbrough by two goals to one; some 20 years later, that match was voted the best ever played at the Feethams ground. MacDonald top-scored for Darlington in 1985–86 with 16 league goals, but injury deprived him of the chance to partner new signing David Currie the following season, at the end of which they were relegated. In 1987–88, MacDonald played regularly alongside Currie, whose performances earned him a move to a higher level. MacDonald stayed with Darlington for one more season, but left the club when they were relegated out of the Football League into the Conference. He had scored 47 goals from 196 appearances in all competitions.

After a few months with Stockport County during which he made only four first-team appearances, Cyril Knowles signed him for Hartlepool United in December 1989 for a £5,000 fee. MacDonald made 16 appearances that season but scored only once, and after three more matches in the 1990–91 season, he moved into non-league football with South Bank.

== Career statistics ==
Appearances and goals by club, season and competition
Club	Season	League			FA Cup		League Cup		Other		Total	
Club	Season	Division	Apps	Goals	Apps	Goals	Apps	Goals	Apps	Goals	Apps	Goals
Middlesbrough	1980–81	First Division	7	0	0	0	0	0	—		7	0
Middlesbrough	1981–82	First Division	8	1	1	0	0	0	—		9	1
Middlesbrough	1982–83	Second Division	9	1	1	0	1	0	—		11	1
Middlesbrough	1983–84	Second Division	29	3	3	1	2	0	—		34	4
Middlesbrough	Total		53	5	5	1	3	0	—		61	6
Carlisle United	1984–85	Second Division	9	0	—		1	0	—		10	0
Darlington	1984–85	Fourth Division	33	4	6	2	—		4 (Note: Appearances in Associate Members' Cup)	1	43	7
Darlington	1985–86	Third Division	36	16	1	0	4	1	3	1	44	18
Darlington	1986–87	Third Division	10	3	1	0	1	0	0	0	12	3
Darlington	1987–88	Fourth Division	42	7	1	0	3	3	4	3	50	13
Darlington	1988–89	Fourth Division	41	5	0	0	4	1	2	0	47	6
Darlington	Total		162	35	9	2	12	5	13	5	196	47
Stockport County	1989–90	Fourth Division	1	0	0	0	3	1	0	0	4	1
Hartlepool United	1989–90	Fourth Division	16	1	—		—		—		16	1
Hartlepool United	1990–91	Fourth Division	2	0	—		1	0	—		3	0
Hartlepool United	Total		18	1	—		1	0	—		19	1
Career total			243	41	14	3	20	6	13	5	290	55
