= 1981–82 Celtic F.C. season =

Celtic
1981–82 season
- Chairman: Desmond White
- Manager: Billy McNeil
- Stadium: Celtic Park
- Scottish Premier Division: 1st
- Scottish Cup: 4th Round
- Scottish League Cup: Group stage
- European Cup: 1st round
- Top goalscorer: League: George McCluskey 21; All: George McCluskey 25
- Highest home attendance: 48,144
- Lowest home attendance: 8,352
- Average home league attendance: 22,718

During the 1981–82 Scottish football season, Celtic competed in the Scottish Premier Division.

== Competitions ==
=== Scottish Premier Division ===
==== League table ====
Pos	Team	Pld	W	D	L	GF	GA	GD	Pts	Qualification or relegation
1	Celtic (C)	36	24	7	5	79	33	+46	55	Qualification for the European Cup first round
2	Aberdeen	36	23	7	6	71	29	+42	53	Qualification for the Cup Winners' Cup first round
3	Rangers	36	16	11	9	57	45	+12	43	Qualification for the UEFA Cup first round
4	Dundee United	36	15	10	11	61	38	+23	40	Qualification for the UEFA Cup first round
5	St Mirren	36	14	9	13	49	52	−3	37	

Source: Statto
Rules for classification: 1) points; 2) goal difference; 3) number of goals scored.
(C) Champions

==== Matches ====
29 August 1981 Premier League	Celtic	5–2	Airdrieonians	Glasgow
15:00				Stadium: Celtic Park; Attendance: 21,124

5 September 1981 Premier League	Aberdeen	1–3	Celtic	Aberdeen
15:00				Stadium: Pittodrie Stadium; Attendance: 19,085

12 September 1981 Premier League	Celtic	2–1	Morton	Glasgow
15:00				Stadium: Celtic Park; Attendance: 19,852

19 September 1981 Premier League	Rangers	0–2	Celtic	Glasgow
15:00				Stadium: Ibrox Stadium; Attendance: 43,321

26 September 1981 Premier League	Celtic	2–0	Partick Thistle	Glasgow
15:00 BST				Stadium: Celtic Park; Attendance: 15,259

3 October 1981 Premier League	Dundee	1–3	Celtic	Dundee
15:00 BST				Stadium: Dens Park; Attendance: 13,254

10 October 1981 Premier League	St Mirren	1–2	Celtic	Paisley
15:00 BST				Stadium: St Mirren Park, Love Street; Attendance: 17,007

17 October 1981 Premier League	Celtic	1–1	Dundee United	Glasgow
15:00 BST				Stadium: Celtic Park; Attendance: 22,635

24 October 1981 Premier League	Hibernian	1–0	Celtic	Edinburgh
15:00 BST				Stadium: Easter Road; Attendance: 18,245

31 October 1981 Premier League	Airdrieonians	1–3	Celtic	Airdrie
15:00 BST				Stadium: Broomfield Park; Attendance: 11,408

7 November 1981 Premier League	Celtic	2–1	Aberdeen	Glasgow
15:00 BST				Stadium: Celtic Park; Attendance: 29,326

14 November 1981 Premier League	Morton	1–1	Celtic	Greenock
15:00 GMT				Stadium: Cappielow Park; Attendance: 12,212

21 November 1981 Premier League	Celtic	3–3	Rangers	Glasgow
15:00 GMT				Stadium: Celtic Park; Attendance: 48,052

28 November 1981 Premier League	Partick Thistle	1–2	Celtic	Glasgow
15:00 GMT				Stadium: Firhill Park; Attendance: 12,929

5 December 1981 Premier League	Celtic	3–1	Dundee	Glasgow
15:00 GMT				Stadium: Celtic Park; Attendance: 14,170

9 January 1982 Premier League	Rangers	1–0	Celtic	Glasgow
15:00 GMT				Stadium: Ibrox Stadium; Attendance: 40,703

30 January 1982 Premier League	Aberdeen	1–3	Celtic	Aberdeen
15:00 GMT				Stadium: Pittodrie Stadium; Attendance: 19,288

2 February 1982 Premier League	Celtic	0–0	Hibernian	Glasgow
19:30 GMT				Stadium: Celtic Park; Attendance: 16,727

6 February 1982 Premier League	Dundee	1–3	Celtic	Dundee
15:00 GMT				Stadium: Dens Park; Attendance: 11,377

20 February 1982 Premier League	Celtic	2–2	Partick Thistle	Glasgow
15:00 GMT				Stadium: Celtic Park; Attendance: 14,089

27 February 1982 Premier League	Hibernian	1–0	Celtic	Edinburgh
15:00 GMT				Stadium: Easter Road; Attendance: 15,914

3 March 1982 Premier League	Celtic	1–0	Morton	Glasgow
19:30 GMT				Stadium: Celtic Park; Attendance: 8,352

13 March 1982 Premier League	St Mirren	2–5	Celtic	Paisley
15:00 GMT				Stadium: St Mirren Park, Love Street; Attendance: 17,084

20 March 1982 Premier League	Celtic	2–0	Airdrieonians	Glasgow
15:00 GMT				Stadium: Celtic Park; Attendance: 12,008

27 March 1982 Premier League	Celtic	0–1	Aberdeen	Glasgow
15:00 GMT				Stadium: Celtic Park; Attendance: 29,582

31 March 1982 Premier League	Dundee United	0–2	Celtic	Dundee
19:30 GMT				Stadium: Tannadice Park; Attendance: 15,173

3 April 1982 Premier League	Morton	1–1	Celtic	Greenock
15:00 GMT				Stadium: Cappielow Park; Attendance: 9,227

10 April 1982 Premier League	Celtic	2–1	Rangers	Glasgow
15:00 GMT				Stadium: Celtic Park; Attendance: 48,144

14 April 1982 Premier League	Airdrieonians	1–5	Celtic	Airdrie
19:30 GMT				Stadium: Broomfield Park; Attendance: 8,387

17 April 1982 Premier League	Celtic	4–2	Dundee	Glasgow
15:00 BST				Stadium: Celtic Park; Attendance: 13,688

21 April 1982 Premier League	Celtic	3–1	Dundee United	Glasgow
19:30 BST				Stadium: Celtic Park; Attendance: 14,392

24 April 1982 Premier League	Partick Thistle	0–3	Celtic	Glasgow
15:00 BST				Stadium: Firhill Park; Attendance: 15,136

1 May 1982 Premier League	Celtic	6–0	Hibernian	Glasgow
15:00 BST				Stadium: Celtic Park; Attendance: 16,064

3 May 1982 Premier League	Celtic	0–0	St Mirren	Glasgow
15:00 BST				Stadium: Celtic Park; Attendance: 27,395

8 May 1982 Premier League	Dundee United	3–0	Celtic	Dundee
15:00 BST				Stadium: Tannadice Park; Attendance: 16,761

15 May 1982 Premier League	Celtic	3–0	St Mirren	Glasgow
15:00 BST				Stadium: Celtic Park; Attendance: 38,069

=== Scottish Cup ===
23 January 1982 Third round	Celtic	4–0	Queen of the South	Glasgow
15:00 GMT				Stadium: Celtic Park; Attendance: 11,281

13 February 1982 Fourth round	Aberdeen	1–0	Celtic	Aberdeen
15:00 GMT				Stadium: Pittodrie Stadium; Attendance: 24,000

=== Scottish League Cup ===
8 August 1981 Group stage	Celtic	1–3	St Mirren	Glasgow
15:00 GMT				Stadium: Celtic Park; Attendance: 26,614

12 August 1981 Group stage	St Johnstone	2–0	Celtic	Perth
19:30 GMT				Stadium: Muirton Park; Attendance: 10,406

15 August 1981 Group stage	Celtic	4–1	Hibernian	Glasgow
15:00 GMT				Stadium: Celtic Park; Attendance: 19,265

19 August 1981 Group stage	Celtic	4–1	St Johnstone	Glasgow
19:30 GMT				Stadium: Celtic Park; Attendance: 14,598

22 August 1981 Group stage	St Mirren	1–5	Celtic	Paisley
15:00 GMT				Stadium: St Mirren Park, Love Street; Attendance: 17,955

26 August 1981 Group stage	Hibernian	1–4	Celtic	Edinburgh
19:30 GMT				Stadium: Easter Road; Attendance: 13,856

=== European Cup ===
16 September 1981 1st round 1st leg	Celtic (Scotland)	1–0	(Italy) Juventus	Glasgow
20:00 GMT		Report		Stadium: Celtic Park; Attendance: 60,017

30 September 1981 1st round 2nd leg	Juventus (Italy)	2–0 (2–1 agg.)	(Scotland) Celtic	Turin
20:00 GMT		Report		Stadium: Stadio Comunale Vittorio Pozzo. Attendance: 69,000

=== Glasgow Cup ===
13 October 1981 Semi-final	Queen's Park	0–2	Celtic	Glasgow
19:30 GMT		Report		Stadium: Hampden Park; Attendance: 1,854

13 May 1982 Final	Rangers	1–2	Celtic	Glasgow
19:30 GMT		Report		Stadium: Ibrox Park; Attendance: 32,700

== Staff ==
Board of Directors
Position	Name
Chairman	Desmond White
Secretary	Desmond White
Directors	Thomas Devlin, James Farrell, Kevin Kelly

Football Staff
Position	Name
Manager	Billy McNeill
Assistant Manager	John Clark
Reserve Team Manager	Bobby Lennox
Reserve Team Coach	Jimmy Lumsden
Trainer	Neil Mochan
Physio	Brian Scott
Masseur	Jimmy Steele

== Transfers ==
Transfers In
Date	Name	From	Transfer Fee
July 1981	Willie Garner	Aberdeen	£50,000
		Total Transfer Fees	£50,000

Transfers Out
Date	Name	To	Transfer Fee
July 1981	Roddie MacDonald	Heart of Midlothian F.C.	£55,000
February 1982	Jim Duffy	Greenock Morton F.C.	£25,000
		Total Transfer Fees	£80,000
