= Charlie Nicholas =

Scottish footballer (born 1961)

Personal information
- Full name: Charles Nicholas
- Date of birth: 30 December 1961 (age 64)
- Place of birth: Glasgow, Scotland
- Height: 5 ft 10 in (1.78 m)
- Position: Forward

Youth career
- Celtic Boys Club
- 1979–1980: Celtic

Senior career*
| Years | Team | Apps | (Gls) |
| 1979–1983 | Celtic | 74 | (48) |
| 1983–1988 | Arsenal | 151 | (34) |
| 1988–1990 | Aberdeen | 77 | (30) |
| 1990–1995 | Celtic | 112 | (37) |
| 1995–1996 | Clyde | 31 | (5) |
| Total | | 445 | (154) |

International career
| 1980–1984 | Scotland U21 | 6 | (2) |
| 1983–1989 | Scotland | 20 | (5) |
| 1987 | Scotland B | 1 | (0) |
| 1990 | Scottish League XI | 1 | (0) |
- * Club domestic league appearances and goals

Charles Nicholas (born 30 December 1961) is a Scottish former professional footballer. A striker, Nicholas is best known for his spells at Celtic and Arsenal. He won 20 international caps for Scotland, including playing at the 1986 FIFA World Cup.

Nicholas began his career at Celtic, and by the age of 21 was considered the most exciting emerging talent in British football. With several English clubs keen to sign him, he joined Arsenal in the summer of 1983. He spent over four years there, and scored both their goals in their League Cup Final win over Liverpool in 1987. Nicholas fell out of favour at Highbury later that year, and moved back to Scotland to join Aberdeen. He won two Cup Finals in his time at Pittodrie, before rejoining Celtic in 1990. His second spell at Parkhead was less successful than his first, but he spent five seasons there before moving on to Clyde for one season before retiring from playing.

Since retiring he has worked in the media, most recently on the Sky Sports show Soccer Saturday, until August 2020.

== Club career ==
=== Celtic ===
Born in Cowcaddens, Glasgow, Nicholas grew in the Maryhill area of the city (specifically the Wyndford estate) where he was a childhood friend and neighbour of fellow footballer Jim Duffy. He began his career as a youth with the Celtic Boys Club, before signing for Celtic in 1979. He made his first team debut at 17 years of age on 14 August 1979 in a Glasgow Cup tie against Queens Park, scoring Celtic's second goal in a 3–1 win. Aside from his goal, the youngster displayed alertness and confidence. He made his second appearance in the next round of the same competition on 22 August, opening the scoring in a 3–0 win over Clyde and providing the assist for Bobby Lennox to score Celtic's third goal. Nicholas returned to playing for the reserves again for the rest of the season. His next first team outing was in July 1980 in a Drybrough Cup tie against Ayr United. Celtic lost 1–0 in a poor showing, although Nicholas continued to impress with his quick and busy play.

His first appearance for Celtic in a major competition came on 16 August 1980 when he replaced the injured Frank McGarvey during the second half of Celtic's 3–0 win away against Kilmarnock in the league. Nicholas began to feature regularly for Celtic, and on 30 August scored his first goals in major competition when he netted twice during a 6–1 win over Stirling Albion in the Scottish League Cup. Playing up front alongside one of either Frank McGarvey or George McCluskey, he went on to score 20 goals in 23 games up to the end of December 1980. He continued to score regularly after the turn of the year, including two goals against Rangers in February 1981 as Celtic came from behind to win 3–1 and go top of the league. Manager Billy McNeill praised Nicholas, stating "It's a wonderful thing for a youngster to score twice in one of those [Old Firm] games", adding that "The world is going to hear a lot more about Charlie [Nicholas]". He finished the season with a total of 28 goals, the last of which he scored in a 1–0 win over Rangers at Ibrox in April 1981, and Celtic went on to clinch the Scottish Premier Division title days later with a win away at Dundee United. Nicholas' form saw him win the 1981 Scottish PFA Young Player of the Year Award.

The following season saw Nicholas play less regularly, having lost his place in the side to McCluskey. Worse, he suffered a broken leg in a friendly match against Morton in January 1982 and missed the rest of the season.

Nicholas returned to the team for the start of season 1982–83 in August 1982, playing in all six matches of the group stages of the 1982–83 Scottish League Cup, scoring seven goals as Celtic qualified with ease, including a four-goal haul in a 7–1 rout of Dunfermline. Celtic, and Nicholas, continued their goalscoring form into the league campaign, and by mid September Nicholas had amassed a total of 16 goals. Celtic faced Ajax in the first round of the European Cup in September 1982. Nicholas scored a penalty in the first leg at Parkhead, which finished 2–2 on the night. Celtic went into the second leg as underdogs, but an outstanding goal by Nicholas put Celtic ahead in Amsterdam. In a move also involving Paul McStay and Frank McGarvey, Nicholas received the ball from McGarvey and ran into the Ajax penalty box. He evaded two tackles from Ajax defenders before curling an excellently placed left-foot finish past goalkeeper Piet Schrijvers. Ajax later scored themselves, but a last minute winner from George McCluskey saw Celtic progress 4–3 on aggregate. Nicholas later said of his goal, "That was probably my all-time favourite goal. My greatest game."

Nicholas was now being described as the most outstanding young player to emerge in Scotland since Kenny Dalglish. He displayed an excellent touch and great vision on the ball and possessed a strong shot with both feet. The only asset he lacked was a turn of pace, although his other attributes covered for that. His partnership up front with Frank McGarvey helped Nicholas become the leading goalscorer in Scotland and one of the best strikers in the British game. On 4 December 1982, he opened the scoring for Celtic in their 2–1 win over Rangers in the Scottish League Cup final. After New Year, Nicholas became the centre of intense media speculation linking him with a move to England; with television, radio and newspapers journalists travelling north to cover Nicholas' goalscoring exploits. The Celtic star was featured regularly on the Saturday lunch-time television show Saint and Greavsie which showed Nicholas' latest goals. Despite his prolific goalscoring, the uncertainty over his future at Celtic appeared to unsettle the team towards the end of the season and they ended up losing the league to Dundee United. In the final league match of the season, Nicholas scored twice from penalty kicks as Celtic recovered from a 2–0 deficit at half-time against Rangers to win 4–2. At the end of the game he ran behind the goal to wave what appeared to be his "goodbyes" to the Celtic fans.

He finished the season with 48 goals and won both the Scottish PFA Player of the Year and Scottish Football Writers' Player of the Year awards. The weeks that followed the end of the season saw Liverpool, Manchester United and Arsenal all being strongly linked with signing Nicholas. Liverpool's Kenny Dalglish and Graeme Souness, whom Nicholas knew from being with in the Scotland international squad, made strenuous efforts to persuade Nicholas to come to Anfield. Tottenham Hotspur and Inter Milan were also interested in signing the Celtic player.

=== Arsenal ===
Terry Neill signed Nicholas for Arsenal on 22 June 1983 for a transfer fee of £750,000 (£2,550,000 today), making him at the time the second most expensive export from the Scottish league. As a 21-year-old at the time of his move to Arsenal, he reportedly became the highest paid footballer in Britain and was described as being "the most exciting player to emerge in Britain since George Best". He made his competitive debut for Arsenal in the opening league match of the season on 27 August 1983 at Highbury against Luton Town. Although he did not score, Nicholas turned in an impressive performance and helped his side to a 2–1 win. Former Scotland international Ian St John said that Nicholas showed he was a player of "genuine class" and that there was a "buzz of excitement every time he moved on to the ball". Two days later, Nicholas scored his first goals for his new club in a 2–1 win away at Wolves.

However, he failed to score again until Boxing Day. By this time Arsenal had endured a slump in form and were lying sixteenth in the First Division, resulting in the sacking of manager Terry Neill on 16 December 1983. The festive period saw Nicholas return to scoring form: He scored twice in a 4–2 win over North London rivals Tottenham Hotspur on Boxing Day, endearing himself to the supporters. Nicholas scored again upon the following day from a penalty kick in a 1–1 draw against Birmingham City, his first goal scored at Highbury. Under new manager Don Howe, Arsenal improved in the second half of the season and eventually finished in sixth place. The 1983–84 campaign would prove to be Nicholas' best at Arsenal, with him scoring a sum of 11 times in the league: As so, he won Arsenal's Player of the Year award for 1984.

Nicholas's lifestyle in the capital was the subject of much tabloid speculation, earning him the nickname "Champagne Charlie". In November 1984, while at Arsenal, Nicholas was given a second drink-driving ban in the space of two years, after admitting driving with excess alcohol.

With the lack of a striker of the ilk of Frank McGarvey to play alongside at Arsenal, Nicholas barely broke double figures in the following seasons, not helped that he was also often played just off the main striker. While Nicholas could display extravagant skills, a lack of consistency restricted his impact. The arrival of George Graham as the new manager of Arsenal in the summer of 1986 saw Nicholas no longer have an automatic place in the team. Arsenal, however, did reach the League Cup final against Liverpool in April 1987. Liverpool's Ian Rush gave his side the lead on 23 minutes, but Nicholas equalised seven minutes later after a goal mouth scramble. In the second half, he appeared to be fouled in the penalty box by Gary Gillespie, but the referee ignored Arsenal's claims for a penalty. With seven minutes left, Nicholas received a cross from Perry Groves and shot at goal. The ball took a deflection off Ronnie Whelan, and went into the goal having deceived Bruce Grobbelaar. Arsenal held on to win 2–1. With this Wembley brace Nicholas thus became a club hero.

Nicholas was linked with a return to Celtic in 1987, but this did not materialise. He was dropped from the Arsenal team four games into the start of the 1987–88 season, in favour of Perry Groves as the strike-partner for new signing Alan Smith. He spent the rest of his time at Highbury playing for their reserves.

Nicholas was ranked at number 28 in the club's list of the '50 Greatest Gunners of all time'. Altogether he scored 54 goals in 184 matches for Arsenal.

=== Aberdeen ===
Nicholas joined Aberdeen in January 1988 for a transfer fee of £400,000 (£1,110,000 today), stating his desire to get his career back on track. After a slow start at Pittodrie (three goals in 16 league games in the 1987–88 season), he rediscovered his form and scored 16 league goals in the 1988–89 season, finishing joint top-scorer in the league alongside Celtic's Mark McGhee.

He maintained his form into what transpired to be his final season, 1989–90, and in October 1989 picked up his first silverware since returning to Scotland, as Aberdeen defeated Rangers 2–1 in the Scottish League Cup Final. The arrival of Dutch forward Hans Gilhaus in November 1989 saw the pair immediately form a good partnership up front. The two helped Aberdeen win the Scottish Cup, both scoring their penalty kicks in Aberdeen's penalty-shoot win over Celtic in May 1990. In all, Nicholas played 104 games for The Dons in two and a half years, scoring 36 goals.

Looking back on his time in an interview for Aberdeen's Red Matchday magazine, Nicholas stated "Looking back with hindsight, I know I should never have left Aberdeen when I did".

=== Return to Celtic ===
In summer 1990, Nicholas returned to Celtic. His comeback season at Parkhead saw him playing a total of 14 games and scoring six goals within the league. The arrival of new manager Liam Brady at Celtic in 1991 saw an improvement in fortune for Nicholas, and he went on to score 21 league goals during season 1991–92. In March 1992 he scored two outstanding goals in consecutive weeks. On 21 March he opened the scoring at Ibrox in a 2–0 win over Rangers; taking a long ball from a Chris Morris free kick, he volleyed home a powerful shot past goalkeeper Andy Goram. A week later on 28 March, he ran across the Dundee United defence 25 yards out and suddenly chipped the ball past an unsuspecting Alan Main. Despite his goalscoring, Celtic again failed to win any silverware. He lost his place in the team halfway through 1992–93 as Celtic bought Frank McAvennie, but regained his place the following season as McAvennie fell out of favour.

Nicholas was released by manager Lou Macari in May 1994, although after Macari was sacked a month later, Nicholas was subsequently re-signed by new manager Tommy Burns. However, in 1994–95 he played in only 12 out of 36 league games and was unable to score a single goal. He was left out of the 1995 Scottish Cup Final against Airdrie and Celtic released him again, so he moved on from the club for the last time. In five years back at Celtic he had played 114 league games and scored 37 league goals.

=== Clyde ===
In July 1995 Nicholas joined Clyde on a free transfer, where he spent one season and scored five times in 31 league games before retiring as a player.

== International career ==
Nicholas was first capped by Scotland at senior level on 30 March 1983, near the end of his first spell at Celtic. He was on the scoresheet in a 2–2 draw with Switzerland at Hampden Park. He was in Scotland's squad for the 1986 World Cup, playing in the group matches against Denmark and Uruguay. He won the last of his 20 senior caps for Scotland on 26 April 1989 in a 2–1 win over Cyprus at Hampden Park. The last of his five goals for Scotland had come on 17 October 1984 in a 3–0 win over Iceland at Hampden Park early in the World Cup qualifying stages.

== Career after retirement ==
Nicholas previously worked as a pundit on the Sky Sports News programme Soccer Saturday and Sky Sports' coverage of Scottish football. He is also a part-time newspaper columnist. In April 2010 Nicholas criticised Celtic's majority shareholder Dermot Desmond. He accused Desmond and the board of presiding over the worst Celtic squad he had ever seen. Nicholas criticised Desmond's handling of the club, accusing him of treating the Glasgow club like "a toy", and failing to invest properly in the playing staff.

In January 2014, Nicholas was inducted into the Scottish Football Hall of Fame.

== Personal life ==
Nicholas is a practising Catholic.

== Career statistics ==
=== Club ===
Appearances and goals by club, season and competition
| Club | Season | League | | | National Cup | | League Cup | | Continental | | Other (Note: Appearances in Glasgow Cup, Drybrough Cup and Scottish Challenge Cup) | | Total | |
| Club | Season | Division | Apps | Goals | Apps | Goals | Apps | Goals | Apps | Goals | Apps | Goals | Apps | Goals |
|---|---|---|---|---|---|---|---|---|---|---|---|---|---|---|
| Celtic | 1979–80 | Scottish Premier Division | 0 | 0 | 0 | 0 | 0 | 0 | 0 | 0 | 2 | 2 | 2 | 2 |
| Celtic | 1980–81 | Scottish Premier Division | 29 | 16 | 5 | 3 | 7 | 6 | 4 | 3 | 2 | 0 | 47 | 28 |
| Celtic | 1981–82 | Scottish Premier Division | 10 | 3 | 0 | 0 | 4 | 3 | 1 | 0 | 0 | 0 | 15 | 6 |
| Celtic | 1982–83 | Scottish Premier Division | 35 | 29 | 3 | 4 | 11 | 13 | 4 | 2 | 0 | 0 | 53 | 48 |
| Celtic | Total | | 74 | 48 | 8 | 7 | 22 | 22 | 9 | 5 | 4 | 2 | 117 | 84 |
| Arsenal | 1983–84 | First Division | 41 | 11 | 1 | 1 | 4 | 1 | – | | – | | 46 | 13 |
| Arsenal | 1984–85 | First Division | 38 | 9 | 3 | 1 | 3 | 2 | – | | – | | 44 | 12 |
| Arsenal | 1985–86 | First Division | 41 | 10 | 5 | 4 | 7 | 4 | – | | – | | 53 | 18 |
| Arsenal | 1986–87 | First Division | 28 | 4 | 4 | 4 | 6 | 3 | – | | – | | 38 | 11 |
| Arsenal | 1987–88 | First Division | 3 | 0 | 0 | 0 | 0 | 0 | – | | – | | 3 | 0 |
| Arsenal | Total | | 151 | 34 | 13 | 10 | 20 | 10 | 0 | 0 | 0 | 0 | 184 | 54 |
| Aberdeen | 1987–88 | Scottish Premier Division | 16 | 3 | 6 | 2 | 0 | 0 | 0 | 0 | – | | 22 | 5 |
| Aberdeen | 1988–89 | Scottish Premier Division | 28 | 16 | 5 | 1 | 3 | 1 | 1 | 0 | – | | 37 | 18 |
| Aberdeen | 1989–90 | Scottish Premier Division | 33 | 11 | 5 | 2 | 5 | 0 | 2 | 0 | – | | 45 | 13 |
| Aberdeen | Total | | 77 | 30 | 16 | 5 | 8 | 1 | 3 | 0 | 0 | 0 | 104 | 36 |
| Celtic | 1990–91 | Scottish Premier Division | 13 | 6 | 0 | 0 | 1 | 0 | – | | – | | 14 | 6 |
| Celtic | 1991–92 | Scottish Premier Division | 37 | 21 | 3 | 0 | 2 | 2 | 4 | 2 | – | | 46 | 25 |
| Celtic | 1992–93 | Scottish Premier Division | 16 | 2 | 0 | 0 | 1 | 0 | 3 | 0 | – | | 20 | 2 |
| Celtic | 1993–94 | Scottish Premier Division | 35 | 8 | 0 | 0 | 3 | 1 | 4 | 0 | – | | 42 | 9 |
| Celtic | 1994–95 | Scottish Premier Division | 11 | 0 | 0 | 0 | 4 | 1 | – | | – | | 15 | 1 |
| Celtic | Total | | 112 | 37 | 3 | 0 | 11 | 4 | 11 | 2 | 0 | 0 | 137 | 43 |
| Clyde | 1995–96 | Scottish First Division | 31 | 5 | 4 | 2 | 0 | 0 | – | | 1 | 0 | 36 | 7 |
| Career total | | | 445 | 154 | 44 | 24 | 61 | 37 | 23 | 7 | 5 | 2 | 578 | 224 |

=== International ===
Appearances and goals by national team and year
| National team | Year | Apps | Goals |
|---|---|---|---|
| Scotland | 1983 | 7 | 3 |
| Scotland | 1984 | 3 | 2 |
| Scotland | 1985 | 2 | 0 |
| Scotland | 1986 | 6 | 0 |
| Scotland | 1987 | 1 | 0 |
| Scotland | 1989 | 1 | 0 |
| Total | | 20 | 5 |

Scores and results list Scotland's goal tally first, score column indicates score after each Nicholas goal.

List of international goals scored by Charlie Nicholas
| No. | Date | Venue | Opponent | Score | Result | Competition | Ref. |
|---|---|---|---|---|---|---|---|
| 1 | 30 March 1983 | Hampden Park, Glasgow, Scotland | Switzerland | 2–2 | 2–2 | UEFA Euro 1984 qualification | |
| 2 | 16 June 1983 | Commonwealth Stadium, Edmonton, Canada | Canada | 1–0 | 3–0 | Friendly | |
| 3 | 12 October 1983 | Hampden Park, Glasgow, Scotland | Belgium | 1–1 | 1–1 | UEFA Euro 1984 qualification | |
| 4 | 12 September 1984 | Hampden Park, Glasgow, Scotland | Yugoslavia | 6–1 | 6–1 | Friendly | |
| 5 | 17 October 1984 | Hampden Park, Glasgow, Scotland | Iceland | 3–0 | 3–0 | 1986 FIFA World Cup qualification | |

== Honours ==
Celtic

- Scottish Premier Division: 1980–81, 1981–82
- Scottish League Cup: 1982–83

Arsenal

- Football League Cup: 1986–87

Aberdeen

- Scottish Cup: 1989–90
- Scottish League Cup: 1989–90

Individual

- Scottish PFA Player of the Year: 1983
- Scottish Football Writers' Player of the Year: 1983
- Scottish PFA Young Player of the Year: 1981
- Arsenal Player of the Season: 1983−84
- Scottish Premier Division Golden Boot: 1982–83, 1988–89 (shared)
- Daily Record Golden Shot: 1982–83
- European Golden Shoe: third place (1983)
- Scottish Football Hall of Fame: 2014
