= 1984–85 Carlisle United F.C. season =

Carlisle United F.C.
1984–85 season
- Manager: Bob Stokoe
- Stadium: Brunton Park
- Second Division: 16th
- FA Cup: Fourth round
- League Cup: Second round

For the 1984–85 season, Carlisle United F.C. competed in Football League Division Two.

== Results & fixtures ==
=== Football League Second Division ===
==== League table ====
Pos	Team	Pld	W	D	L	GF	GA	GD	Pts
14	Oldham Athletic	42	15	8	19	49	67	−18	53
15	Crystal Palace	42	12	12	18	46	65	−19	48
16	Carlisle United	42	13	8	21	50	67	−17	47
17	Charlton Athletic	42	11	12	19	51	63	−12	45
18	Sheffield United	42	10	14	18	54	66	−12	44

Rules for classification: 1) Points; 2) Goal difference; 3) Goals scored

==== Matches ====
Match Day	Date	Opponent	H/A	Score	Carlisle United Scorer(s)	Attendance
1	25 August	Brighton & Hove Albion	H	0–3		
2	27 August	Barnsley	A	3–1		
3	1 September	Blackburn Rovers	A	2–2		
4	4 September	Shrewsbury Town	H	2–0		
5	8 September	Manchester City	H	0–0		
6	15 September	Birmingham City	A	0–1		
7	22 September	Sheffield United	H	1–1		
8	29 September	Oxford United	A	0–4		
9	6 October	Wimbledon	A	0–3		
10	13 October	Crystal Palace	H	1–0		
11	20 October	Grimsby Town	A	0–4		
12	27 October	Huddersfield Town	H	0–1		
13	10 November	Leeds United	A	1–1		
14	17 November	Cardiff City	A	1–2		
15	20 November	Fulham	H	3–0		
16	24 November	Notts County	H	1–0		
17	30 November	Charlton Athletic	A	1–2		
18	8 December	Portsmouth	H	3–0		
19	15 December	Oldham Athletic	A	3–2		
20	23 December	Blackburn Rovers	H	0–1		
21	26 December	Middlesbrough	H	0–3		
22	29 December	Shrewsbury Town	A	2–4		
23	1 January	Wolverhampton Wanderers	A	2–0		
24	2 February	Oxford United	H	0–1		
25	5 February	Brighton & Hove Albion	A	1–4		
26	9 February	Manchester City	A	3–1		
27	23 February	Fulham	A	2–3		
28	26 February	Leeds United	H	2–2		
29	2 March	Huddersfield Town	A	0–2		
30	9 March	Grimsby Town	H	1–1		
31	12 March	Birmingham City	H	2–1		
32	17 March	Crystal Palace	A	1–2		
33	23 March	Wimbledon	H	6–1		
34	30 March	Barnsley	H	2–0		
35	6 April	Middlesbrough	A	2–1		
36	8 April	Wolverhampton Wanderers	H	0–1		
37	13 April	Sheffield United	A	0–0		
38	20 April	Cardiff City	H	0–1		
39	27 April	Notts County	A	0–3		
40	3 May	Charlton Athletic	H	1–1		
41	6 May	Portsmouth	A	1–3		
42	11 May	Oldham Athletic	H	2–5		

=== Football League Cup ===
Round	Date	Opponent	H/A	Score	Carlisle United Scorer(s)	Attendance
R2 L1	25 September	Fulham	A	0–2		
R2 L2	9 October	Fulham	H	1–2		

=== FA Cup ===
Round	Date	Opponent	H/A	Score	Carlisle United Scorer(s)	Attendance
R3	5 January	Dagenham	H	1–0		
R4	26 January	Leicester City	A	0–1		
