= Paul Robinson (footballer, born 1971) =

English footballer

Personal information
- Full name: Paul James Robinson
- Date of birth: 21 February 1971
- Place of birth: Nottingham, England
- Height: 6 ft 4 in (1.93 m)
- Position: Striker

Youth career
- Notts County
- Bury

Senior career*
Years	Team	Apps	(Gls)
1989–1990	Scarborough	20	(3)
1990–1991	Plymouth Argyle	11	(3)
1991–1992	Hereford United	11	(0)
1992–199?	Cheltenham Town		
1998	Bromsgrove Rovers		
1998–????	Arnold Town		
- * Club domestic league appearances and goals

Paul James Robinson (born 21 February 1971) is an English former professional footballer who scored six goals from 42 Football League appearances. A striker, he played league football for Scarborough, Plymouth Argyle and Hereford United. After a break in his career due to injury, he went on to play non-league football for Bromsgrove Rovers and Arnold Town.

== Football career ==
=== Scarborough ===
Robinson was born in Nottingham, and began his football career as a youngster with Notts County and then Bury. In 1989, as an 18-year-old, he had a trial with Scarborough, a Fourth Division club in only their third season in the Football League. Manager Colin Morris said later that he had been "frankly, quite awful", apart from one piece of skill "when he trapped a ball at pace and pinged it 50 yards in one movement out to the wing, from where we scored". Robinson signed for Scarborough on a free transfer.

In his fifth competitive game for the club, Scarborough faced Chelsea, who were then in second place in the First Division, in the second round of the League Cup. Two goals behind on the night, 3–1 down on aggregate, With 24 minutes to go, Tommy Graham scored with a header. Four minutes later, Robinson scrambled the ball home to bring the scores level.

Then after a further four minutes, Steve Norris was fouled in the penalty area. While Chelsea claimed the player had been offside, the referee awarded the penalty kick. Martin Russell converted to complete the victory on what the Scarborough Evening News years later labelled "one of the most memorable nights in the club's history". Robinson said afterwards: "Chelsea made the mistake of under-estimating us. We fancied our chances after holding them to a draw at Stamford Bridge. It's a lovely feeling."

In the next round, Scarborough lost 7–0 on Oldham Athletic's plastic pitch, and a few weeks later, Robinson was substituted at half-time as Scarborough lost at home in the FA Cup to Whitley Bay, three divisions below them in the league system. He scored three times in 20 league appearances over the season, at the end of which he moved up to the Second Division with Plymouth Argyle for a £15,000 fee.

=== Plymouth Argyle ===
During Argyle's pre-season tour of Sweden, Sunday Independent journalist Rupert Metcalf assessed Robinson as more mobile than fellow new arrival, target-man Robbie Turner, and with "genuine potential, although he clearly still has some rough edges to be refined". On his first competitive start, Robinson scored twice in a minute – first a header, then a run followed by a shot from distance – in a 3–2 win against Millwall. This earned him a place in the starting eleven for the next few matches, but he failed to score and lost his place. In the second half of the season he scored once from three starts and one substitute appearance, and returned to the Fourth Division with Hereford United for 1991–92. He was reportedly disappointed at being given insufficient opportunity to succeed at the higher level.

=== Hereford United ===
Robinson began Hereford's new season in the starting eleven. He scored on his first appearance, in the Herefordshire Senior Cup, and hit a hat-trick against Mostyn in the Welsh Cup, but was sent off in his first league match and again in his fifth. He was denied a goal as non-League club Atherstone Town held Hereford to a goalless draw in the FA Cup: the goalkeeper turned Andy Theodosiu's header onto the bar, Robinson headed the rebound back into the net, but it was disallowed because Theodosiu was lying on the goalline in an offside position. Robinson played intermittently, making seven league starts and four substitute appearances without scoring, and played his last Football League match on 25 April 1992 at the age of 21.

=== Non-League football ===
He moved into non-league football with Cheltenham Town at the end of the season, and eventually retired from playing because of a back injury. However, in the 1998 close season he felt he had recovered enough to attempt a comeback. He played in a friendly match for Tamworth, but signed for Southern League club Bromsgrove Rovers instead. He played until late October, including a five-week spell out with a broken wrist, but then left the club for personal reasons and signed for Arnold Town.
