= 1982–83 Scottish League Cup =

Tournament details
- Country: Scotland

Final positions
- Champions: Celtic
- Runners-up: Rangers

Tournament statistics
- Top goal scorer: Charlie Nicholas (13)

The 1982–83 Scottish League Cup was the thirty-seventh season of Scotland's second football knockout competition. The competition was won by Celtic, who defeated Rangers in the Final.

== First round ==
=== Group 1 ===
Team	Pld	W	D	L	GF	GA	GD	Pts
Celtic	6	6	0	0	29	3	+26	12
Arbroath	6	2	1	3	4	9	−5	5
Alloa Athletic	6	2	0	4	7	13	−6	4
Dunfermline Ath	6	1	1	4	3	18	−15	3

Home team	Score	Away team	Date
Arbroath	1–2	Alloa Athletic	14 August 1982
Celtic	6–0	Dunfermline Ath	14 August 1982
Alloa Athletic	0–5	Celtic	18 August 1982
Dunfermline Ath	0–0	Arbroath	18 August 1982
Arbroath	0–3	Celtic	21 August 1982
Dunfermline Ath	2–1	Alloa Athletic	21 August 1982
Arbroath	1–0	Dunfermline Ath	25 August 1982
Celtic	4–1	Alloa Athletic	25 August 1982
Alloa Athletic	0–1	Arbroath	28 August 1982
Dunfermline Ath	1–7	Celtic	28 August 1982
Alloa Athletic	3–0	Dunfermline Ath	1 September 1982
Celtic	4–1	Arbroath	1 September 1982

=== Group 2 ===
Team	Pld	W	D	L	GF	GA	GD	Pts
Aberdeen	6	4	2	0	18	7	+11	10
Morton	6	3	2	1	16	11	+5	8
Dundee	6	2	2	2	14	19	−5	6
Dumbarton	6	0	0	6	7	18	−11	0

Home team	Score	Away team	Date
Morton	2–2	Aberdeen	11 August 1982
Aberdeen	3–3	Dundee	14 August 1982
Dumbarton	1–3	Morton	14 August 1982
Dundee	3–2	Dumbarton	18 August 1982
Aberdeen	3–0	Dumbarton	21 August 1982
Morton	4–1	Dundee	21 August 1982
Aberdeen	3–0	Morton	25 August 1982
Dumbarton	2–3	Dundee	25 August 1982
Dundee	1–5	Aberdeen	28 August 1982
Morton	4–1	Dumbarton	28 August 1982
Dundee	3–3	Morton	1 September 1982
Dumbarton	1–2	Aberdeen	8 September 1982

=== Group 3 ===
Team	Pld	W	D	L	GF	GA	GD	Pts
Rangers	6	4	2	0	13	6	+7	10
Hibernian	6	1	4	1	6	6	0	6
Airdrieonians	6	2	1	3	9	11	−2	5
Clydebank	6	1	1	4	8	13	−5	3

Home team	Score	Away team	Date
Airdrieonians	1–3	Clydebank	14 August 1982
Hibernian	1–1	Rangers	14 August 1982
Clydebank	0–2	Hibernian	18 August 1982
Rangers	3–1	Airdrieonians	18 August 1982
Clydebank	1–4	Rangers	21 August 1982
Hibernian	1–1	Airdrieonians	21 August 1982
Airdrieonians	1–2	Rangers	25 August 1982
Hibernian	1–1	Clydebank	25 August 1982
Clydebank	1–2	Airdrieonians	28 August 1982
Rangers	0–0	Hibernian	28 August 1982
Airdrieonians	3–1	Hibernian	1 September 1982
Rangers	3–2	Clydebank	1 September 1982

=== Group 4 ===
Team	Pld	W	D	L	GF	GA	GD	Pts
Dundee United	6	6	0	0	22	2	+20	12
St Johnstone	6	3	1	2	15	10	+5	7
Falkirk	6	1	1	4	3	15	−12	3
Raith Rovers	6	0	2	4	5	18	−13	2

Home team	Score	Away team	Date
Dundee United	3–0	St Johnstone	14 August 1982
Raith Rovers	0–0	Falkirk	14 August 1982
Falkirk	0–4	Dundee United	18 August 1982
St Johnstone	5–0	Raith Rovers	18 August 1982
Dundee United	5–1	Raith Rovers	21 August 1982
Falkirk	1–6	St Johnstone	21 August 1982
Dundee United	4–0	Falkirk	25 August 1982
Raith Rovers	3–3	St Johnstone	25 August 1982
Falkirk	2–0	Raith Rovers	28 August 1982
St Johnstone	0–3	Dundee United	28 August 1982
Raith Rovers	1–3	Dundee United	1 September 1982
St Johnstone	1–0	Falkirk	1 September 1982

=== Group 5 ===
Team	Pld	W	D	L	GF	GA	GD	Pts
Heart of Midlothian	6	5	0	1	16	4	+12	10
Motherwell	6	3	2	1	10	7	+3	8
Forfar Athletic	6	2	1	3	5	6	−1	5
Clyde	6	0	1	5	5	19	−14	1

Home team	Score	Away team	Date
Forfar Athletic	2–0	Clyde	14 August 1982
Motherwell	2–1	Heart of Midlothian	14 August 1982
Clyde	3–3	Motherwell	18 August 1982
Heart of Midlothian	2–1	Forfar Athletic	18 August 1982
Clyde	1–7	Heart of Midlothian	21 August 1982
Motherwell	1–1	Forfar Athletic	21 August 1982
Forfar Athletic	0–2	Heart of Midlothian	25 August 1982
Motherwell	3–1	Clyde	25 August 1982
Clyde	0–1	Forfar Athletic	28 August 1982
Heart of Midlothian	1–0	Motherwell	28 August 1982
Forfar Athletic	0–1	Motherwell	1 September 1982
Heart of Midlothian	3–0	Clyde	1 September 1982

=== Group 6 ===
Team	Pld	W	D	L	GF	GA	GD	Pts
St Mirren	6	4	1	1	14	3	+11	9
Stirling Albion	6	2	3	1	5	4	+1	7
Ayr United	6	2	2	2	8	8	0	6
Queen of the South	6	1	0	5	3	15	−12	2

Home team	Score	Away team	Date
St Mirren	3–1	Ayr United	14 August 1982
Stirling Albion	2–0	Queen of the South	14 August 1982
Ayr United	0–0	Stirling Albion	18 August 1982
Queen of the South	0–1	St Mirren	18 August 1982
Ayr United	0–2	Queen of the South	21 August 1982
Stirling Albion	0–3	St Mirren	21 August 1982
St Mirren	6–0	Queen of the South	25 August 1982
Stirling Albion	1–1	Ayr United	25 August 1982
Ayr United	2–1	St Mirren	28 August 1982
Queen of the South	0–2	Stirling Albion	28 August 1982
Queen of the South	1–4	Ayr United	1 September 1982
St Mirren	0–0	Stirling Albion	1 September 1982

=== Group 7 ===
Team	Pld	W	D	L	GF	GA	GD	Pts
Partick Thistle	6	3	3	0	12	3	+9	9
Brechin City	6	2	4	0	10	2	+8	8
East Stirlingshire	6	1	2	3	4	13	−9	4
East Fife	6	0	3	3	0	8	−8	3

Home team	Score	Away team	Date
East Fife	0–0	Brechin City	14 August 1982
East Stirlingshire	0–4	Partick Thistle	14 August 1982
Brechin City	4–0	East Stirlingshire	18 August 1982
Partick Thistle	0–0	East Fife	18 August 1982
East Fife	0–1	East Stirlingshire	21 August 1982
Partick Thistle	0–0	Brechin City	21 August 1982
East Fife	0–3	Partick Thistle	25 August 1982
East Stirlingshire	1–1	Brechin City	25 August 1982
Brechin City	4–0	East Fife	28 August 1982
Partick Thistle	4–2	East Stirlingshire	28 August 1982
Brechin City	1–1	Partick Thistle	1 September 1982
East Stirlingshire	0–0	East Fife	1 September 1982

=== Group 8 ===
Team	Pld	W	D	L	GF	GA	GD	Pts
Kilmarnock	6	4	1	1	13	3	+10	9
Berwick Rangers	6	3	0	3	5	8	−3	6
Queen's Park	6	2	1	3	6	11	−5	5
Hamilton Academical	6	1	2	3	3	5	−2	4

Home team	Score	Away team	Date
Kilmarnock	4–0	Berwick Rangers	14 August 1982
Queen's Park	1–1	Hamilton Academical	14 August 1982
Berwick Rangers	1–0	Queen's Park	18 August 1982
Hamilton Academical	0–0	Kilmarnock	18 August 1982
Berwick Rangers	0–1	Hamilton Academical	21 August 1982
Queen's Park	0–2	Kilmarnock	21 August 1982
Kilmarnock	1–0	Hamilton Academical	25 August 1982
Queen's Park	2–1	Berwick Rangers	25 August 1982
Berwick Rangers	2–1	Kilmarnock	28 August 1982
Hamilton Academical	1–2	Queen's Park	28 August 1982
Hamilton Academical	0–1	Berwick Rangers	1 September 1982
Kilmarnock	5–1	Queen's Park	1 September 1982

=== Group 9 ===
Team	Pld	W	D	L	GF	GA	GD	Pts
Cowdenbeath	5	3	1	1	7	4	+3	7
Meadowbank Thistle	5	3	1	1	7	4	+3	7
Montrose	5	3	1	1	6	4	+2	7
Stenhousemuir	5	0	4	1	4	8	−4	4
Stranraer	5	1	1	3	7	8	−1	3
Albion Rovers	5	0	2	3	6	9	−3	2

Home team	Score	Away team	Date
Albion Rovers	2–2	Stranraer	14 August 1982
Cowdenbeath	0–1	Montrose	14 August 1982
Stenhousemuir	1–1	Meadowbank Thistle	14 August 1982
Meadowbank Thistle	3–2	Albion Rovers	18 August 1982
Stenhousemuir	2–2	Montrose	18 August 1982
Stranraer	1–3	Cowdenbeath	18 August 1982
Albion Rovers	0–0	Stenhousemuir	21 August 1982
Meadowbank Thistle	0–1	Cowdenbeath	21 August 1982
Montrose	1–0	Stranraer	21 August 1982
Cowdenbeath	2–1	Albion Rovers	25 August 1982
Montrose	0–1	Meadowbank Thistle	25 August 1982
Stenhousemuir	0–4	Stranraer	25 August 1982
Albion Rovers	1–2	Montrose	28 August 1982
Cowdenbeath	1–1	Stenhousemuir	28 August 1982
Stranraer	0–2	Meadowbank Thistle	28 August 1982

Play-off

Home team	Score	Away team	Date
Cowdenbeath	3–0	Meadowbank Thistle	1 September 1982

== Supplementary round ==
=== First leg ===
Home team	Score	Away team	Date
Kilmarnock	1–0	Cowdenbeath	6 September 1982

=== Second leg ===
Home team	Score	Away team	Date	Agg
Cowdenbeath	1–0	Kilmarnock	8 September 1982	1–1

== Quarter-finals ==
=== First leg ===
Home team	Score	Away team	Date
Celtic	4–0	Partick Thistle	8 September 1982
St Mirren	1–1	Heart of Midlothian	8 September 1982
Aberdeen	1–3	Dundee United	22 September 1982
Kilmarnock	1–6	Rangers	22 September 1982

=== Second leg ===
Home team	Score	Away team	Date	Agg
Heart of Midlothian	2–1	St Mirren	22 September 1982	3–2
Partick Thistle	0–3	Celtic	22 September 1982	0–7
Dundee United	1–0	Aberdeen	6 October 1982	4–1
Rangers	6–0	Kilmarnock	6 October 1982	12–1

== Semi-finals ==
=== First leg ===
Home team	Score	Away team	Date
Celtic	2–0	Dundee United	27 October 1982
Rangers	2–0	Heart of Midlothian	27 October 1982

=== Second leg ===
Home team	Score	Away team	Date	Agg
Dundee United	2–1	Celtic	10 November 1982	2–3
Heart of Midlothian	1–2	Rangers	10 November 1982	1–4

== Final ==
4 December 1982
15:00

Celtic	2–1	Rangers
Nicholas 23'; MacLeod 31'	CelticWiki Report	Bett 46'

Hampden Park, Glasgow
Attendance: 55,372
Referee: Kenny Hope
