= Tommy Graham (footballer, born 1955) =

Scottish footballer

Personal information
- Full name: Thomas Graham
- Date of birth: 31 March 1955 (age 71)
- Place of birth: Glasgow, Scotland
- Height: 5 ft 10 in (1.78 m)
- Position: Midfielder

Senior career*
Years	Team	Apps	(Gls)
- Arthurlie
1978	Aston Villa	0	(0)
1978–1980	Barnsley	38	(18)
1980–1982	Halifax Town	71	(17)
1982–198?	Doncaster Rovers	11	(2)
198?–198?	Motherwell	1	(0)
1983–1986	Scunthorpe United	109	(21)
1986–1990	Scarborough	150	(14)
1990–1992	Halifax Town	58	(4)
- Frickley Athletic
- * Club domestic league appearances and goals

Thomas Graham (born 31 March 1955) is a Scottish former professional footballer who made 398 appearances in the Football League and one in the Scottish League. A forward or midfielder, he played league football for Barnsley, Halifax Town, Doncaster Rovers, Motherwell, Scunthorpe United and Scarborough.

== Football career ==
Graham began his football career with Arthurlie before moving to England where, after a brief spell with Aston Villa, he signed for Barnsley in late 1978 for a £25,000 fee. In his first 13 games, playing at centre-forward, he scored 11 goals. Graham played 38 League matches in his two years with Barnsley, and scored 18 goals, before moving on to Halifax Town in October 1980 for £20,000. He played regularly for Halifax until the club's financial problems forced them to release a number of players, Graham included, at the end of the 1981–82 season.

After a few months with Doncaster Rovers, which included a goal in their 7–5 defeat of Reading, and a spell back in his native Scotland, where he played once for Motherwell, Graham signed for Scunthorpe United in March 1983. To clinch promotion to the Third Division on the last day of that season, Scunthorpe needed to win at Chester and rely on Bury failing to beat Wimbledon. Bury lost, and Graham scored twice as Scunthorpe won 2–1 in a match held up for 11 minutes by fans fighting. Over the next three years, Graham played regularly and finished his Scunthorpe career with 21 goals from 109 League matches.

In 1986, Graham was one of numerous new signings at Football Conference club Scarborough, where Neil Warnock was the new manager. He was a regular in Scarborough's midfield as they won the division, six points clear of favourites Barnet, to become the first team to benefit from the introduction of direct promotion and relegation between Conference and League in place of the longstanding re-election system. In the club's second season in the League, he helped them reach the play-off semi-final, and the following season, he was a goalscorer in what the Daily Mirror dubbed "one of the most humiliating Cup defeats in [Chelsea's] history". Scarborough were two goals behind on the night, 3–1 down on aggregate, to Chelsea, who were then in second place in the First Division, in the second round of the League Cup. With 24 minutes to go, Graham headed Martin Russell's cross in off the crossbar. Four minutes later, Paul Robinson scrambled the ball home to bring the scores level. Then after a further four minutes, Steve Norris was fouled in the penalty area. While Chelsea claimed the player had been offside, the referee awarded the penalty kick, which Russell converted to complete the victory.

After 150 appearances in League and Conference matches for Scarborough, Graham returned to Halifax Town in January 1990. He was ever-present to the end of the 1989–90 season, and even went in goal against Walsall in March when Jonathan Gould was injured and there was no goalkeeper among the substitutes. Halifax were 2–0 down at the time, but Graham kept a clean sheet while his teammates scored five goals. Over the next two seasons he made a further 37 League appearances and played non-League football for Frickley Athletic before retiring from the game.

== Personal life ==
Graham was born in Glasgow. His brothers Arthur, Jimmy and David all played English or Scottish League football.

After his football career ended, Graham practised as a chiropodist in Barnsley.
