= Steve Richards (footballer) =

Scottish footballer

Personal information
- Full name: Stephen Richards
- Date of birth: 24 October 1961 (age 65)
- Place of birth: Dundee, Scotland
- Height: 6 ft 0 in (1.83 m)
- Position: Defender

Senior career*
Years	Team	Apps	(Gls)
1979–1983	Hull City	58	(2)
1983	Grantham Town		
1984	Goole Town		
1984	Gainsborough Trinity		
1984–1985	York City	7	(0)
1985–1986	Lincoln City	21	(0)
1986–1987	Cambridge United	4	(2)
1987–1991	Scarborough	164	(13)
1991–1992	Halifax Town	25	(0)
1992–1993	Doncaster Rovers	38	(3)
1993–2000	Guiseley		
Total		317	(20)

Managerial career
- Guiseley
- 1998–1999: Gainsborough Trinity
- 2000–2001: Frickley Athletic
- 2001–: Goole
- 2003–2005: Ossett Town
- 200?–: Hall Road Rangers
- * Club domestic league appearances and goals

Stephen Richards (born 24 October 1961) is a Scottish former professional footballer.

In August 1998 he succeeded Ernie Moss as manager of Gainsborough Trinity. He, along with his assistant Paul Olsson, resigned from the post on 7 October 1999 following the fall out from Trinity's FA Cup Third Qualifying Round Replay 2–1 defeat at home to Droylsden two days previously which saw Trinity players Mick Norbury and Neil Lacey sent-off: Lacey for a late tackle which caused the Droyslden bench to invade the pitch and Norbury after the final whistle.

In October 2000 he was appointed manager at Frickley Athletic with the club struggling at the foot of the Northern Premier League Premier Division with just six points from 14 league games. He subsequently guided the club to the First Round proper of the FA Cup as well as ensuring the club avoided relegation with a last day victory at Lancaster City giving the club 45 points from 44 matches.

In September 2001, following a run of eight games without a win, he resigned his post at Frickley Athletic, but wasted no time in finding a new club as he succeeded Peter Daniel as manager of Goole.

In October 2003 he was appointed manager at Ossett Town with the club rock bottom of the Northern Premier League Division One with just three points from 13 games but Richards managed to steer them to fourteenth place by the end of the season.
