= 1982–83 Scottish Premier Division =

77th season of top-tier football league in Scotland

Scottish Premier Division
- Season: 1982–83
- Champions: Dundee United; 1st Premier Division title 1st Scottish title
- Relegated: Morton; Kilmarnock
- European Cup: Dundee United
- Cup Winners' Cup: Aberdeen; Rangers
- UEFA Cup: Celtic; St Mirren
- Matches: 180
- Goals: 529 (2.94 per match)
- Top goalscorer: Charlie Nicholas (29)
- Biggest home win: Hibernian 8–1 Kilmarnock
- Biggest away win: Motherwell 0–7 Celtic

The 1982–83 Scottish Premier Division season was won by Dundee United, one point ahead of Celtic and Aberdeen. Morton and Kilmarnock were relegated.

Dundee United clinched the league championship with a 2–1 win in a Dundee derby against Dundee at Dens Park on the final day of the season.

== Table ==
Pos	Team	Pld	W	D	L	GF	GA	GD	Pts	Qualification or relegation
1	Dundee United (C)	36	24	8	4	90	35	+55	56	Qualification for the European Cup first round
2	Celtic	36	25	5	6	90	36	+54	55	Qualification for the UEFA Cup first round
3	Aberdeen	36	25	5	6	76	25	+51	55	Qualification for the Cup Winners' Cup first round
4	Rangers	36	13	12	11	53	41	+12	38	Qualification for the Cup Winners' Cup first round
5	St Mirren	36	11	12	13	47	51	−4	34	Qualification for the UEFA Cup first round
6	Dundee	36	9	11	16	42	53	−11	29	
7	Hibernian	36	7	15	14	35	51	−16	29	
8	Motherwell	36	11	5	20	39	73	−34	27	
9	Morton (R)	36	6	8	22	36	81	−45	20	Relegation to the 1983–84 Scottish First Division
10	Kilmarnock (R)	36	3	11	22	28	91	−63	17	Relegation to the 1983–84 Scottish First Division

Source: Statto
Rules for classification: 1) points; 2) goal difference; 3) number of goals scored.
(C) Champions; (R) Relegated

== Results ==
=== Matches 1–18 ===
During matches 1–18 each team plays every other team twice (home and away).

Home \ Away	ABE	CEL	DND	DNU	HIB	KIL	MOR	MOT	RAN	STM
Aberdeen		1–2	1–0	5–1	2–0	2–0	4–1	2–1	1–2	4–0
Celtic	1–3		2–0	2–0	2–0	2–1	5–1	3–1	3–2	5–0
Dundee	0–2	2–3		0–2	2–1	5–2	2–0	3–1	1–0	1–1
Dundee United	2–0	2–2	1–0		3–0	7–0	6–0	5–0	4–2	3–0
Hibernian	1–1	2–3	1–1	0–0		2–2	1–2	1–0	0–0	0–0
Kilmarnock	0–2	0–4	0–0	1–1	1–1		3–1	0–2	0–0	2–2
Morton	1–1	1–2	1–2	1–2	0–0	0–0		3–1	0–0	2–0
Motherwell	0–2	0–7	1–0	0–2	0–1	4–1	3–1		2–2	2–0
Rangers	0–1	1–2	1–1	0–0	3–2	5–0	1–1	4–0		1–0
St Mirren	1–1	1–2	0–0	0–2	3–0	3–2	1–1	3–0	2–2	

Legend: Blue = home team win; Yellow = draw; Red = away team win.

=== Matches 19–36 ===
During matches 19–36 each team plays every other team twice (home and away).

Home \ Away	ABE	CEL	DND	DNU	HIB	KIL	MOR	MOT	RAN	STM
Aberdeen		1–0	3–1	1–2	5–0	5–0	2–0	5–1	2–0	0–1
Celtic	1–3		2–2	2–3	4–1	4–0	2–0	3–0	0–0	1–1
Dundee	0–2	2–1		1–2	0–1	0–0	3–3	3–1	2–1	2–5
Dundee United	0–3	1–1	5–3		3–3	4–0	1–1	4–0	3–1	3–2
Hibernian	0–0	0–3	0–0	0–0		8–1	2–0	1–1	1–2	1–1
Kilmarnock	1–2	0–5	2–0	0–5	0–2		4–0	1–1	0–1	2–2
Morton	1–2	0–3	1–0	0–4	0–1	3–0		0–1	0–5	0–2
Motherwell	0–3	2–1	1–1	1–4	2–0	3–1	4–1		3–0	0–0
Rangers	2–1	2–4	1–1	2–1	1–1	1–1	2–0	1–0		4–0
St Mirren	1–1	0–1	2–1	1–2	3–0	2–0	2–3	4–0	1–0	

Legend: Blue = home team win; Yellow = draw; Red = away team win.

== Awards ==
Award	Winner	Club
PFA Players' Player of the Year	(Scotland) Charlie Nicholas	Celtic
PFA Young Player of the Year	(Scotland) Paul McStay	Celtic
SFWA Footballer of the Year	(Scotland) Charlie Nicholas	Celtic
