= List of Celtic F.C. seasons =

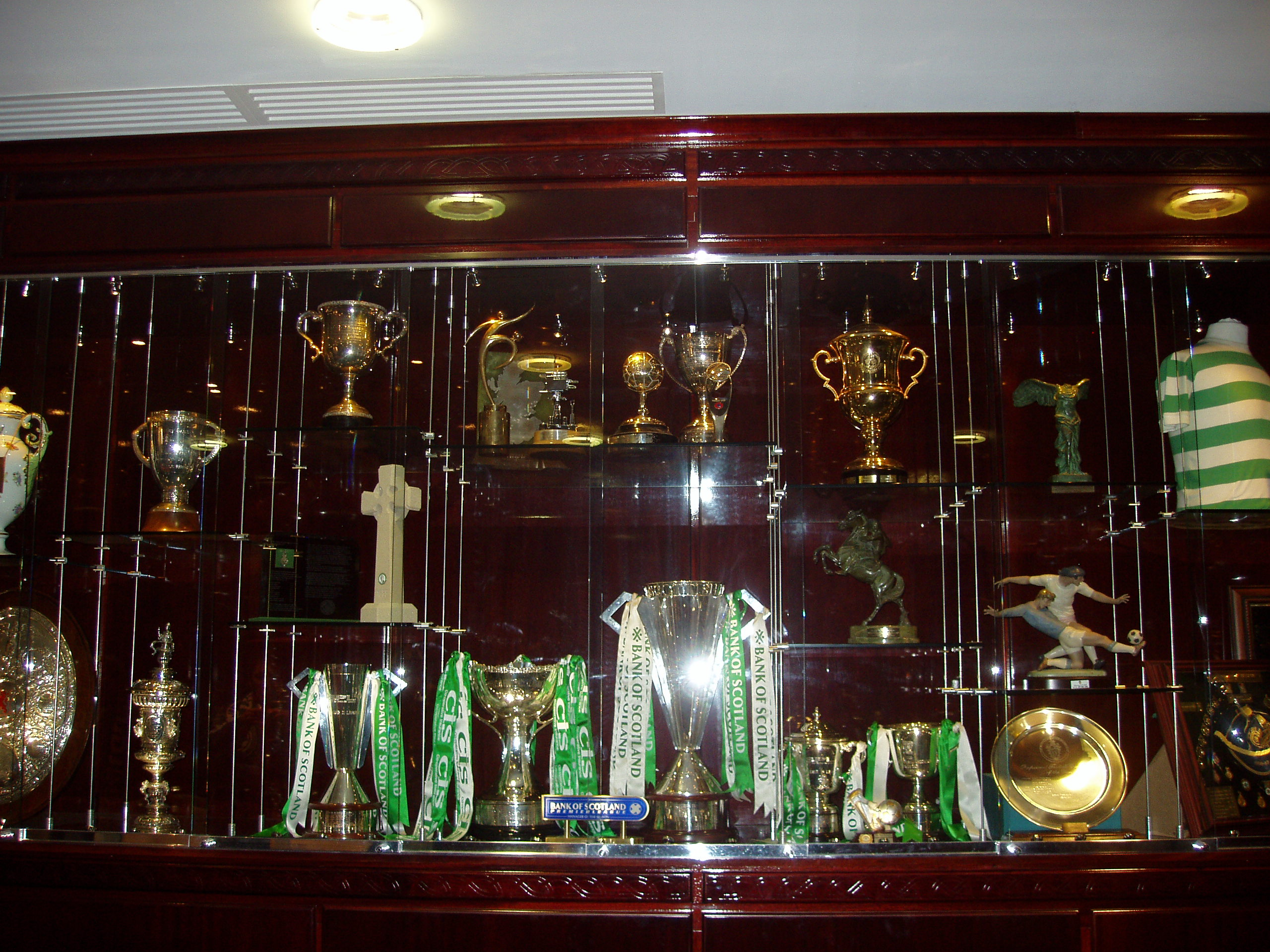
Some of the trophies won by Celtic FC

Celtic Football Club is a Scottish professional association football club based in Parkhead, Glasgow. The club was founded in 1887 and played their first match in May 1888, a friendly match against Rangers. The club played their first competitive match in September 1888, when they entered the first round of the 1888–89 Scottish Cup, and were founding members of the Scottish Football League in 1890 from which they have remained in the top tier of ever since. Celtic have won the Scottish league title on a record 56 occasions, the Scottish Cup 43 times and the Scottish League Cup 22 times. The club enjoyed their greatest successes during the 1960s and 1970s under Jock Stein when they won nine consecutive league titles and the European Cup.

As of the end of the 2024–25 season, the club have played more than 130 seasons in Scottish football. The table details their achievements and the top goalscorer in senior major first-team competitions to the end of the most recently completed season. Details of the partially completed league campaign in the 1939–40 season, abandoned due to the Second World War, are also included.

== History ==
Celtic played their first ever competitive match on 1 September 1888, a first round Scottish Cup tie against Shettleston, winning 5–1, and eventually reaching the final where they lost to Third Lanark after a replay. The team also made their debuts in the Glasgow Cup and the North-Eastern Cup that same season, reaching the semi-final of the Glasgow Cup where they lost to Queens Park, and defeating Cowlairs 6–1 in the final of the North-Eastern Cup to win their first ever trophy. The Scottish Football League was formed in 1890, and Celtic were among the founding members, finishing third behind joint-winner's Rangers and Dumbarton in the competition's inaugural season.

In 1891, Celtic won their second trophy when they beat Third Lanark 4–0 in the final of the Glasgow Cup. The following year saw Celtic winning their first major tournament, defeating Queen's Park 5–1 in the 1892 Scottish Cup Final. A first league title then followed in season 1892–93. The Glasgow Cup remained a prestigious tournament for some years, but declined in importance after the Second World War following the introduction of the Scottish League Cup and European club competitions. Celtic have since gone on to win the Scottish League Championship on a record 56 occasions, including a run of nine consecutive titles in the 1960s, 1970s and the 2010s, the Scottish Cup 42 times, and the Scottish League Cup 22 times.

Celtic first participated in European competition during the 1962–63 season, their third-place finish in the league the previous season qualifying them for the Inter-Cities Fairs Cup. They went on to reach two European Cup Winner's Cup semi-finals in 1964 and 1966, before going on to become the first British club to win the European Cup in 1967, defeating Inter Milan 2–1 in the final. Celtic reached the European Cup Final again in 1970, but lost to Feyenoord. Their last appearance in a European final was in 2003 when they lost 3–2 to FC Porto in the UEFA Cup Final.

== Key ==
Key to league record

- Pld – Matches played
- W – Matches won
- D – Matches drawn
- L – Matches lost
- GF – Goals for
- GA – Goals against
- Pts – Points
- Pos – Final position

Key to divisions

- SFL – Scottish Football League
- SPD – Scottish Football League Premier Division
- SPL – Scottish Premier League
- SP – Scottish Premiership
- – Top scorer in division

Key to rounds

- 1R – first round, etc.
- QF – quarter-finals
- SF – semi-finals
- RU – Runners-up
- W – Winners
- Goals noted for Top Goalscorer comprises goals scored in League, Scottish Cup, Scottish League Cup, Glasgow Cup and European Club competitions.

== Seasons ==
Season	League									Scottish Cup	Scottish League Cup	Glasgow Cup	European competition	Top goalscorer(s)	
Season	Division	Pld	W	D	L	GF	GA	Pts	Pos	Scottish Cup	Scottish League Cup	Glasgow Cup	European competition	Player(s)	Goals
1888–89	–	–	–	–	–	–	–	–	–	RU	N/A (Note: The Scottish League Cup competition did not begin until 1946.)	SF	N/A (Note: European club competitions did not begin until 1955.)	Willie Groves	11
1889–90	–	–	–	–	–	–	–	–	–	1R	N/A	RU	N/A	Willie Groves John Coleman Peter Dowds	2
1890–91	SFL	18	11	3	4	48	21	21	3rd	QF	N/A	W	N/A	Peter Dowds	21
1891–92	SFL	22	16	3	3	62	21	41	2nd	W	N/A	W	N/A	Sandy McMahon	30
1892–93	SFL	18	14	1	3	54	25	29	1st	RU	N/A	RU	N/A	John Campbell	25
1893–94	SFL	18	14	1	3	53	32	29	1st	RU	N/A	SF	N/A	Sandy McMahon	30
1894–95	SFL	18	11	4	3	50	29	26	2nd	QF	N/A	W	N/A	Jake Madden Sandy McMahon	11
1895–96	SFL	18	15	0	3	64	25	30	1st	1R	N/A	W	N/A	Allan Martin	21
1896–97	SFL	18	10	4	4	42	18	24	4th	1R	N/A	RU	N/A	Alex King Sandy McMahon	12
1897–98	SFL	18	15	3	0	56	13	33	1st	2R	N/A	SF	N/A	George Allan	17
1898–99	SFL	18	11	2	5	51	33	24	3rd	W	N/A	SF	N/A	Sandy McMahon	21
1899–1900	SFL	18	9	7	2	46	27	25	2nd	W	N/A	RU	N/A	Jack Bell	14
1900–01	SFL	20	13	3	4	49	28	29	2nd	RU	N/A	1R	N/A	Sandy McMahon	14
1901–02	SFL	18	11	4	3	38	28	26	2nd	RU	N/A	RU	N/A	John Campbell	15
1902–03	SFL	22	8	10	4	36	30	26	5th	QF	N/A	RU	N/A	John Campbell	17
1903–04	SFL	26	18	2	6	68	27	38	4th	W	N/A	RU	N/A	Jimmy Quinn	17
1904–05	SFL	26	18	5	3	68	31	41	1st	SF	N/A	W	N/A	Jimmy Quinn	22
1905–06	SFL	30	24	1	5	76	19	49	1st	QF	N/A	W	N/A	Jimmy Quinn	23
1906–07	SFL	34	23	9	2	80	30	55	1st	W (Note: First League and Cup 'double'.)	N/A	W	N/A	Jimmy Quinn	32
1907–08	SFL	34	24	7	3	86	27	55	1st	W	N/A	W (Note: Second League and Cup 'double'.) (Note: Also won the Glasgow Merchants Charity Cup to claim all four tournaments entered.)	N/A	Jimmy Quinn	22
1908–09	SFL	34	23	5	6	71	24	51	1st	F (Note: 1908–09 Scottish Cup Final between Rangers and Celtic was abandoned due to a riot. The trophy was withheld.)	N/A	RU	N/A	Jimmy Quinn	31
1909–10	SFL	34	24	6	4	63	22	54	1st	SF	N/A	W	N/A	Jimmy Quinn	33
1910–11	SFL	34	15	11	8	48	18	41	5th	W	N/A	RU	N/A	Jimmy Quinn	18
1911–12	SFL	34	17	11	6	58	33	45	2nd	W	N/A	1R	N/A	Jimmy McMenemy	12
1912–13	SFL	34	22	5	7	53	28	49	2nd	QF	N/A	RU	N/A	Jimmy Quinn	14
1913–14	SFL	38	30	5	3	81	14	65	1st	W (Note: Third League and Cup 'double'.)	N/A	SF	N/A	Patsy Gallacher	24
1914–15	SFL	38	30	5	3	91	25	65	1st	N/A (Note: The competition was withdrawn due to the outbreak of the First World War. Unofficial wartime tournaments included the Navy and Army War Fund Shield and the 1919 Victory Cup.)	N/A	1R	N/A	Jimmy McColl	26
1915–16	SFL	38	32	3	3	116	32	67	1st	N/A	N/A	W	N/A	Jimmy McColl	36
1916–17	SFL	38	27	10	1	79	17	64	1st	N/A	N/A	W	N/A	Jimmy McColl	24
1917–18	SFL	34	24	7	3	66	26	55	2nd	N/A	N/A	SF	N/A	Patsy Gallacher	17
1918–19	SFL	34	26	6	2	71	22	58	1st	N/A	N/A	RU	N/A	Jimmy McColl	17
1919–20	SFL	42	29	10	3	89	31	68	2nd	R4	N/A	W	N/A	Tommy McInally	35
1920–21	SFL	42	30	8	6	86	35	66	2nd	R4	N/A	W	N/A	Tommy McInally	32
1921–22	SFL	42	27	13	2	83	20	67	1st	R3	N/A	RU	N/A	Joe Cassidy	20
1922–23	SFL	38	19	8	11	52	39	46	3rd	W	N/A	1R	N/A	Joe Cassidy	34
1923–24	SFL	38	17	12	9	56	33	46	3rd	R1	N/A	SF	N/A	Joe Cassidy	25
1924–25	SFL	38	18	8	12	77	44	44	4th	W	N/A	RU	N/A	Jimmy McGrory	31
1925–26	SFL	38	25	8	5	97	40	58	1st	RU	N/A	RU	N/A	Jimmy McGrory	48
1926–27	SFL	38	21	7	10	101	55	49	3rd	W	N/A	W	N/A	Jimmy McGrory	58
1927–28	SFL	38	23	9	6	93	39	55	2nd	RU	N/A	W	N/A	Jimmy McGrory	63
1928–29	SFL	38	22	7	9	67	44	51	2nd	SF	N/A	W	N/A	Jimmy McGrory	34
1929–30	SFL	38	22	5	11	88	46	49	4th	R3	N/A	RU	N/A	Jimmy McGrory	38
1930–31	SFL	38	24	10	4	101	34	58	2nd	W	N/A	W	N/A	Jimmy McGrory	45
1931–32	SFL	38	20	8	10	94	50	48	3rd	R3	N/A	SF	N/A	Jimmy McGrory	30
1932–33	SFL	38	20	8	10	75	44	48	4th	W	N/A	SF	N/A	Jimmy McGrory	32
1933–34	SFL	38	18	11	9	78	53	47	3rd	R4	N/A	SF	N/A	Frank O'Donnell	28
1934–35	SFL	38	24	4	10	92	45	52	2nd	R4	N/A	SF	N/A	Jimmy McGrory	20
1935–36	SFL	38	32	2	4	115	33	66	1st	R2	N/A	RU	N/A	Jimmy McGrory	50
1936–37	SFL	38	22	8	8	89	58	52	3rd	W	N/A	SF	N/A	Jimmy McGrory	27
1937–38	SFL	38	27	7	4	114	42	61	1st	R3	N/A	SF	N/A	Johnny Crum	27
1938–39	SFL	38	20	8	10	99	53	48	2nd	QF	N/A	W	N/A	John Divers	27
1939–40 (Note: The 1939–40 season was suspended following the outbreak of the Second World War)	SFL	5	3	0	2	7	8	6	6th	–	N/A	SF	N/A	Frank Murphy (Note: John Divers is listed as Celtic's top scorer for 1939-40, but this tally includes goals scored in the unofficial wartime competitions set up in the aftermath of the suspension of official football. Prior to the official season being suspended in October 1939, Frank Murphy was the top scorer.)	3
1940–41	No competitive football was played between 1939 and 1946 due to the Second World War. Celtic entered unofficial competitions including the 1939–40 Emergency League, the 1940 Emergency Cup, the Southern League, the Summer Cup, the Southern League Cup and the 1946 Victory Cup.														
1941–42	No competitive football was played between 1939 and 1946 due to the Second World War. Celtic entered unofficial competitions including the 1939–40 Emergency League, the 1940 Emergency Cup, the Southern League, the Summer Cup, the Southern League Cup and the 1946 Victory Cup.														
1942–43	No competitive football was played between 1939 and 1946 due to the Second World War. Celtic entered unofficial competitions including the 1939–40 Emergency League, the 1940 Emergency Cup, the Southern League, the Summer Cup, the Southern League Cup and the 1946 Victory Cup.														
1943–44	No competitive football was played between 1939 and 1946 due to the Second World War. Celtic entered unofficial competitions including the 1939–40 Emergency League, the 1940 Emergency Cup, the Southern League, the Summer Cup, the Southern League Cup and the 1946 Victory Cup.														
1944–45	No competitive football was played between 1939 and 1946 due to the Second World War. Celtic entered unofficial competitions including the 1939–40 Emergency League, the 1940 Emergency Cup, the Southern League, the Summer Cup, the Southern League Cup and the 1946 Victory Cup.														
1945–46	No competitive football was played between 1939 and 1946 due to the Second World War. Celtic entered unofficial competitions including the 1939–40 Emergency League, the 1940 Emergency Cup, the Southern League, the Summer Cup, the Southern League Cup and the 1946 Victory Cup.														
1946–47	SFL	30	13	6	11	53	55	32	7th	1R	Sect	1R	N/A	Tommy Kiernan	17
1947–48	SFL	30	10	5	15	41	56	25	12th (Note: 12th place in 1947–48 is Celtic's lowest ever league position.)	SF	Sect	SF	N/A	Johnny Paton	10
1948–49	SFL	30	12	7	11	48	40	31	6th	1R	Sect	W	N/A	Jackie Gallacher	21
1949–50	SFL	30	14	7	9	51	50	35	5th	3R	Sect	SF	N/A	John McPhail	21
1950–51	SFL	30	12	5	13	48	46	29	7th	W	QF	RU	N/A	John McPhail	30
1951–52	SFL	30	10	8	12	52	55	28	9th	1R	SF	RU	N/A	Bobby Collins	13
1952–53	SFL	30	11	7	12	51	54	29	8th	QF	Sect	1R	N/A	Bertie Peacock	12
1953–54	SFL	30	20	3	7	72	29	43	1st	W (Note: Fourth League and Cup 'double'.)	Sect	SF	N/A	Neil Mochan	22
1954–55	SFL	30	19	8	3	76	37	46	2nd	RU	Sect	SF	N/A	Jimmy Walsh	25
1955–56	SFL	34	16	9	9	55	39	41	5th	RU	Sect	W	not invited	Neil Mochan	24
1956–57	SFL	34	15	8	11	58	43	38	5th	SF	W	1R	did not qualify	Billy McPhail	18
1957–58	SFL	34	19	8	7	84	47	46	3rd	SF	W	1R	did not qualify	Sammy Wilson	32
1958–59	SFL	34	14	8	12	70	53	36	6th	SF	SF	1R	did not qualify	John Colrain	18
1959–60	SFL	34	12	9	13	73	59	33	9th	SF	Sect	1R	did not qualify	Neil Mochan	22
1960–61	SFL	34	15	9	10	64	46	39	4th	RU	Sect	RU	did not qualify	Stevie Chalmers	26
1961–62	SFL	34	19	8	7	81	37	46	3rd	SF	Sect	W	did not qualify	John Hughes	31
1962–63	SFL	34	19	6	9	76	44	44	4th	RU	Sect	RU	Inter-Cities Fairs Cup – 1R	John Hughes	20
1963–64	SFL	34	19	9	6	89	34	47	3rd	QF	Sect	W	Cup Winners' Cup – SF	Stevie Chalmers	40
1964–65	SFL	34	16	5	13	76	57	37	8th	W	RU	W	Inter-Cities Fairs Cup – 2R	Stevie Chalmers	27
1965–66	SFL	34	27	3	4	106	30	57	1st	RU	W (Note: First League and League Cup 'double'.)	—	Cup Winners' Cup – SF	Joe McBride	43
1966–67	SFL	34	26	6	2	111	33	58	1st	W	W (Note: First League, Cup and League Cup 'treble'.)	W	European Cup – W (Note: Won all five tournaments entered; first northern European club to win European Cup.)	Joe McBride	38
1967–68	SFL	34	30	3	1	106	24	63	1st	1R	W (Note: Second League and League Cup 'double'.)	W	European Cup – 1R Intercontinental Cup – RU	Bobby Lennox	44
1968–69	SFL	34	23	8	3	89	32	54	1st	W	W (Note: Second League, Cup and League Cup 'treble'.)	SF	European Cup – QF	Willie Wallace	34
1969–70	SFL	34	27	3	4	96	33	57	1st	RU	W (Note: Third League and League Cup 'double'.)	W	European Cup – RU	Willie Wallace	24
1970–71	SFL	34	25	6	3	89	23	56	1st	W (Note: Fifth League and Cup 'double'.)	RU	SF	European Cup – QF	Harry Hood	33
1971–72	SFL	34	28	4	2	96	28	60	1st	W (Note: Sixth League and Cup 'double'.)	RU	—	European Cup – SF	Kenny Dalglish	29
1972–73	SFL	34	26	5	3	93	28	57	1st	RU	RU	—	European Cup – 2R	Kenny Dalglish	39
1973–74	SFL	34	23	7	4	82	27	53	1st	W (Note: Seventh League and Cup 'double'.)	RU	—	European Cup – SF	Dixie Deans	33
1974–75	SFL	34	20	5	9	81	41	45	3rd	W	W (Note: First Cup and League Cup 'double'.)	W	European Cup – 1R	Paul Wilson	26
1975–76	SPD	36	21	6	9	71	42	48	2nd	3R	RU	RU	Cup Winners' Cup – QF	Kenny Dalglish	32
1976–77	SPD	36	23	9	4	79	39	55	1st	W (Note: Eighth League and Cup 'double'.)	RU	—	UEFA Cup – 1R	Kenny Dalglish	27
1977–78	SPD	36	15	6	15	63	54	36	5th	4R	RU	—	European Cup – 2R	Joe Craig	16
1978–79	SPD	36	21	6	9	61	37	48	1st	QF	SF	RU	did not qualify	Tom McAdam	16
1979–80	SPD	36	18	11	7	61	38	47	2nd	W	QF	SF	European Cup – QF	George McCluskey	17
1980–81	SPD	36	26	4	6	84	37	56	1st	SF	SF	RU	Cup Winners' Cup – 1R	Frank McGarvey	29
1981–82	SPD	36	24	7	5	79	33	55	1st	4R	Sect	W	European Cup – 1R	George McCluskey	25
1982–83	SPD	36	25	5	6	90	36	55	2nd	SF	W	RU	European Cup – 2R	Charlie Nicholas	48
1983–84	SPD	36	21	8	7	80	41	50	2nd	RU	RU	—	UEFA Cup – 3R	Brian McClair	31
1984–85	SPD	36	22	8	6	77	30	52	2nd	W	QF	SF	Cup Winners' Cup – 2R	Brian McClair	24
1985–86	SPD	36	20	10	6	67	38	50	1st	QF	QF	RU	Cup Winners' Cup – 1R	Brian McClair	29
1986–87	SPD	44	27	9	8	90	41	63	2nd	4R	RU	RU	European Cup – 2R	Brian McClair	41
1987–88	SPD	44	31	10	3	79	23	72	1st	W (Note: Ninth League and Cup 'double'.)	QF	SF	European Cup – 1R	Andy Walker	32
1988–89	SPD	36	21	4	11	66	44	46	3rd	W	QF	N/A (Note: The Glasgow Cup becomes a youth team competition.)	European Cup – 2R	Mark McGhee	19
1989–90	SPD	36	10	14	12	37	37	34	5th	RU	SF	N/A	Cup Winners' Cup – 1R	Dariusz Dziekanowski	16
1990–91	SPD	36	17	7	12	52	38	41	3rd	SF	RU	N/A	did not qualify	Tommy Coyne	20
1991–92	SPD	44	26	10	8	88	42	62	3rd	SF	QF	N/A	UEFA Cup – 2R	Charlie Nicholas	25
1992–93	SPD	44	24	12	8	68	41	60	3rd	4R	SF	N/A	UEFA Cup – 2R	Andy Payton	15
1993–94	SPD	44	15	20	9	51	38	50	4th	R3	SF	N/A	UEFA Cup – 2R	Pat McGinlay	12
1994–95	SPD	36	11	18	7	39	33	51	4th	W	RU	N/A	did not qualify	John Collins	12
1995–96	SPD	36	24	11	1	74	25	83	2nd	SF	QF	N/A	Cup Winners' Cup – 2R	Pierre van Hooijdonk	32
1996–97	SPD	36	23	6	7	78	32	75	2nd	SF	QF	N/A	UEFA Cup – 1R	Jorge Cadete	33
1997–98	SPD	36	22	8	6	64	24	74	1st	SF	W (Note: Fourth League and League Cup 'double'.)	N/A	UEFA Cup – 1R	Henrik Larsson	19
1998–99	SPL	36	21	8	7	84	35	71	2nd	RU	R3	N/A	CL – 2QR UEFA Cup – 2R	Henrik Larsson	38
1999–2000	SPL	36	21	6	9	90	38	69	2nd	R3	W	N/A	UEFA Cup – 2R	Mark Viduka	27
2000–01	SPL	38	31	4	3	90	29	97	1st	W	W (Note: Third League, Cup and League Cup 'treble'.)	N/A	UEFA Cup – 2R	Henrik Larsson	53
2001–02	SPL	38	33	4	1	94	18	103	1st	RU	SF	N/A	CL – GS UEFA Cup – 3R	Henrik Larsson	34
2002–03	SPL	38	31	4	3	98	26	97	2nd	QF	RU	N/A	CL – 3QR UEFA Cup – RU	Henrik Larsson	44
2003–04	SPL	38	31	5	2	105	25	98	1st	W (Note: Tenth League and Cup 'double'.)	QF	N/A	CL – GS UEFA Cup – QF	Henrik Larsson	41
2004–05	SPL	38	30	2	6	85	35	92	2nd	W	QF	N/A	CL – GS	John Hartson	30
2005–06	SPL	38	28	7	3	93	37	91	1st	R3	W (Note: Fifth League and League Cup 'double'.)	N/A	CL – 2QR	John Hartson Maciej Żurawski	20
2006–07	SPL	38	26	6	6	65	34	84	1st	W (Note: Eleventh League and Cup 'double'.)	QF	N/A	CL – R16	Jan Vennegoor of Hesselink	18
2007–08	SPL	38	28	5	5	84	26	89	1st	QF	QF	N/A	CL – R16	Scott McDonald	31
2008–09	SPL	38	24	10	4	80	33	82	2nd	QF	W	N/A	CL – GS	Scott McDonald	20
2009–10	SPL	38	25	6	7	75	39	81	2nd	SF	QF	N/A	CL – PO EL – GS	Robbie Keane	16
2010–11	SPL	38	29	5	4	85	22	92	2nd	W	RU	N/A	CL – 3QR EL – PO	Gary Hooper	22
2011–12	SPL	38	30	3	5	84	21	93	1st	SF	RU	N/A	EL – GS	Gary Hooper	29
2012–13	SPL	38	24	7	7	92	35	79	1st	W (Note: Twelfth League and Cup 'double'.)	SF	N/A	CL – R16	Gary Hooper	31
2013–14	SP	38	31	6	1	102	25	99	1st	5R	3R	N/A	CL – GS	Kris Commons	32
2014–15	SP	38	29	5	4	84	17	92	1st	SF	W (Note: Sixth League and League Cup 'double'.)	N/A	CL – PO EL – R32	Leigh Griffiths	20
2015–16	SP	38	26	8	4	93	31	86	1st	SF	SF	N/A	CL – PO EL – GS	Leigh Griffiths	40
2016–17	SP	38	34	4	0	106	25	106	1st	W	W (Note: Fourth League, Cup and League Cup 'treble'.)	N/A	CL – GS	Moussa Dembélé	32
2017–18	SP	38	24	10	4	73	25	82	1st	W	W (Note: Fifth League, Cup and League Cup 'treble'; second in succession.)	N/A	CL – GS EL – R32	Scott Sinclair	18
2018–19	SP	38	27	6	5	77	20	87	1st	W	W (Note: Sixth League, Cup and League Cup 'treble'; third in succession.)	N/A	CL – 3QR EL – R32	Odsonne Édouard	23
2019–20 (Note: All competitive matches affiliated with the Scottish Football Association were postponed indefinitely on 13 March 2020, due to the coronavirus pandemic.)	SP	30	26	2	2	89	19	80	1st (Note: Season curtailed and standings at time of postponement declared final (including Celtic as champions) on 18 May 2020.)	W	W (Note: Seventh League, Cup and League Cup 'treble'; fourth in succession.)	N/A	CL – 3QR EL – R32	Odsonne Édouard	29
2020–21	SP	38	22	11	5	78	29	77	2nd	4R	2R	N/A	CL – 2QR EL – GS	Odsonne Édouard	22
2021–22	SP	38	29	6	3	92	22	93	1st	SF	W (Note: Seventh League and League Cup 'double'.)	N/A	CL – 2QR EL – GS ECL – KPO	Kyōgo Furuhashi	20
2022–23	SP	38	32	3	3	114	34	99	1st	W	W (Note: Eighth League, Cup and League Cup 'treble'.)	N/A	CL – GS	Kyōgo Furuhashi	34
2023–24	SP	38	29	6	3	95	30	93	1st	W (Note: Thirteenth League and Cup 'double'.)	2R	N/A	CL – GS	Kyōgo Furuhashi Matt O'Riley	19
2024–25	SP	38	29	5	4	112	26	92	1st	RU	W (Note: Eighth League and League Cup 'double'.)	N/A	CL – KPO	Daizen Maeda	33
2025–26	SP	38	26	4	8	73	41	82	1st	W (Note: Fourteenth League and Cup 'double'.)	RU	N/A	CL – PO EL – KPO	Benjamin Nygren	21
