= 1901–02 Celtic F.C. season =

Celtic
1901–02 season
- Manager: Willie Maley
- Stadium: Celtic Park
- Scottish First Division: 2nd
- Scottish Cup: Finalists

1901–02 was Celtic Football Club's 14th season of competitive association football. Celtic competed in the Scottish First Division, in which they ended runners-up for the third consecutive season. They also narrowly missed on Scottish Cup glory as they lost the final 0-1 to Hibernian.

== Competitions ==
=== Scottish First Division ===
==== League table ====
Pos	Team	Pld	W	D	L	GF	GA	GD	Pts	Qualification or relegation
1	Rangers (C)	18	13	2	3	43	29	+14	28	Champions
2	Celtic	18	11	4	3	38	28	+10	26	
3	Heart of Midlothian	18	10	2	6	32	21	+11	22	
4	Third Lanark	18	7	5	6	30	26	+4	19	
5	St Mirren	18	8	3	7	29	28	+1	19	

Source: nozdrul.plus.com
(C) Champions

==== Matches ====
17 August 1901 First Division	Celtic	1–1	Dundee	Glasgow
				Stadium: Celtic Park; Attendance: 5,000

24 August 1901 First Division	Morton	1–2	Celtic	Greenock
				Stadium: Cappielow Park; Attendance: 6,000

31 August 1901 First Division	Celtic	3–2	Queen's Park	Glasgow
				Stadium: Celtic Park; Attendance: 15,000

7 September 1901 First Division	St Mirren	2–3	Celtic	Paisley
				Stadium: St Mirren Park, Love Street; Attendance: 11,000

16 September 1901 First Division	Hibernian	1–2	Celtic	Edinburgh
				Stadium: Easter Road; Attendance: 6,000

21 September 1901 First Division	Celtic	2–1	Morton	Glasgow
				Stadium: Celtic Park; Attendance: 5,500

23 September 1901 First Division	Third Lanark	0–2	Celtic	Glasgow
				Stadium: Cathkin Park; Attendance: 15,000

28 September 1901 First Division	Kilmarnock	0–1	Celtic	Kilmarnock
				Stadium: Rugby Park; Attendance: 8,000

5 October 1901 First Division	Rangers	2–2	Celtic	Glasgow
				Stadium: Ibrox Park; Attendance: 27,000

19 October 1901 First Division	Celtic	1–0	Queen's Park	Glasgow
				Stadium: Celtic Park; Attendance: 19,000

2 November 1901 First Division	Hearts	2–2	Celtic	Edinburgh
				Stadium: Tynecastle Park; Attendance: 12,000

9 November 1901 First Division	Celtic	3–1	St Mirren	Glasgow
				Stadium: Celtic Park

16 November 1901 First Division	Dundee	2–3	Celtic	Dundee
				Stadium: Dens Park; Attendance: 8,000

30 November 1901 First Division	Celtic	1–2	Hearts	Glasgow
				Stadium: Celtic Park; Attendance: 10,000

7 December 1901 First Division	Queen's Park	3–2	Celtic	Glasgow
				Stadium: Hampden Park; Attendance: 13,000

14 December 1901 First Division	Celtic	2–2	Hibernian	Glasgow
				Stadium: Celtic Park; Attendance: 7,000

28 December 1901 First Division	Celtic	4–2	Kilmarnock	Glasgow
				Stadium: Celtic Park; Attendance: 3,000

1 January 1902 First Division	Celtic	2–4	Rangers	Glasgow
				Stadium: Celtic Park; Attendance: 40,000

=== Inter City League ===
4 January 1902 Inter City League	Hibernian	0–1	Celtic	Edinburgh
				Stadium: Easter Road

18 January 1902 Inter City League	Celtic	0–0	Hibernian	Glasgow
				Stadium: Celtic Park

1 March 1902 Inter City League	Rangers	0–5	Celtic	Glasgow
				Stadium: Ibrox Park

15 March 1902 Inter City League	Celtic	2–0	Third Lanark	Glasgow
				Stadium: Celtic Park

29 March 1902 Inter City League	Third Lanark	1–3	Celtic	Glasgow
				Stadium: Cathkin Park

31 March 1902 Inter City League	Celtic	2–3	Hearts	Glasgow
				Stadium: Celtic Park

19 April 1902 Inter City League	Queen's Park	1–3	Celtic	Glasgow
				Stadium: Hampden Park

21 April 1902 Inter City League	Hearts	4–2	Celtic	Edinburgh
				Stadium: Tynecastle Park

9 May 1902 Inter City League	Celtic	2–0	Rangers	Glasgow
				Stadium: Celtic Park

=== Scottish Cup ===
11 January 1902 First round	Celtic	3–0	Thornliebank	Glasgow
				Stadium: Celtic Park; Attendance: 2,000

25 January 1902 Second round	Arbroath	2–3	Celtic	Arbroath
				Stadium: Gayfield Park; Attendance: 5,300

15 February 1902 Third round	Hearts	1–1	Celtic	Edinburgh
				Stadium: Tynecastle Park; Attendance: 14,000

22 February 1902 Third round replay	Celtic	2–1	Hearts	Glasgow
				Stadium: Celtic Park; Attendance: 25,000

22 March 1902 Semi-final	St Mirren	2–3	Celtic	Paisley
				Stadium: St Mirren Park, Love Street; Attendance: 12,000

26 April 1902 Final	Celtic	0–1	Hibernian	Glasgow
				Stadium: Celtic Park; Attendance: 16,000
