= 1937–38 Celtic F.C. season =

Celtic
1937–38 season
- Chairman: Tom White
- Manager: Willie Maley
- Stadium: Celtic Park
- Scottish First Division: 1st
- Scottish Cup: 3rd Round
- Empire Exhibition Trophy: Winners
- Highest home attendance: 83,500
- Lowest home attendance: 2,000
- Average home league attendance: 14,737

During the 1937–38 Scottish football season, Celtic competed in the Scottish First Division.

== Competitions ==
=== Scottish First Division ===
==== League table ====
Pos	Team	Pld	W	D	L	GF	GA	GD	Pts
1	Celtic	38	27	7	4	114	42	+72	61
2	Heart of Midlothian	38	26	6	6	90	50	+40	58
3	Rangers	38	18	13	7	75	49	+26	49
4	Falkirk	38	19	9	10	82	52	+30	47
5	Motherwell	38	17	10	11	78	69	+9	44

Source: RSSSF

==== Matches ====
14 August 1937 Division A	Queen of the South	2–2	Celtic	Dumfries
				Stadium: Palmerston Park; Attendance: 18,700

18 August 1937 Division A	Hamilton Academical	1–2	Celtic	Hamilton
				Stadium: Douglas Park; Attendance: 7,000

21 August 1937 Division A	Celtic	4–0	Morton	Glasgow
				Stadium: Celtic Park; Attendance: 10,000

25 August 1937 Division A	Celtic	2–2	Queen of the South	Glasgow
				Stadium: Celtic Park; Attendance: 19,000

28 August 1937 Division A	Kilmarnock	2–1	Celtic	Kilmarnock
				Stadium: Rugby Park; Attendance: 19,000

4 September 1937 Division A	Celtic	4–2	Hamilton Academical	Glasgow
				Stadium: Celtic Park; Attendance: 15,000

11 September 1937 Division A	Rangers	3–1	Celtic	Glasgow
				Stadium: Ibrox Park; Attendance: 80,000

15 September 1937 Division A	Morton	2–3	Celtic	Greenock
				Stadium: Cappielow Park; Attendance: 7,000

18 September 1937 Division A	Celtic	2–1	Hearts	Glasgow
				Stadium: Celtic Park; Attendance: 35,000

25 September 1937 Division A	Aberdeen	1–1	Celtic	Aberdeen
				Stadium: Pittodrie Park; Attendance: 27,000

2 October 1937 Division A	Celtic	3–1	Clyde	Glasgow
				Stadium: Celtic Park; Attendance: 6,000

9 October 1937 Division A	Arbroath	2–0	Celtic	Arbroath
				Stadium: Gayfield Park; Attendance: 9,000

16 October 1937 Division A	Celtic	4–3	Queen's Park	Glasgow
				Stadium: Celtic Park; Attendance: 6,000

23 October 1937 Division A	Celtic	6–0	St Johnstone	Glasgow
				Stadium: Celtic Park; Attendance: 10,000

6 November 1937 Division A	Celtic	6–0	Partick Thistle	Glasgow
				Stadium: Celtic Park; Attendance: 12,000

13 November 1937 Division A	Third Lanark	1–1	Celtic	Glasgow
				Stadium: Cathkin Park; Attendance: 30,000

20 November 1937 Division A	Ayr United	1–1	Celtic	Ayr
				Stadium: Somerset Park; Attendance: 11,000

27 November 1937 Division A	Celtic	2–0	Falkirk	Glasgow
				Stadium: Celtic Park; Attendance: 10,000

4 December 1937 Division A	Motherwell	1–2	Celtic	Motherwell
				Stadium: Fir Park; Attendance: 12,000

18 December 1937 Division A	Hibernian	0–3	Celtic	Edinburgh
				Stadium: Easter Road; Attendance: 20,000

25 December 1937 Division A	Celtic	8–0	Kilmarnock	Glasgow
				Stadium: Celtic Park; Attendance: 6,000

1 January 1938 Division A	Celtic	3–0	Rangers	Glasgow
				Stadium: Celtic Park; Attendance: 83,500

3 January 1938 Division A	Queen's Park	0–3	Celtic	Glasgow
				Stadium: Hampden Park; Attendance: 20,821

8 January 1938 Division A	Hearts	2–4	Celtic	Edinburgh
				Stadium: Tynecastle Park; Attendance: 44,300

15 January 1938 Division A	Celtic	5–2	Aberdeen	Glasgow
				Stadium: Celtic Park; Attendance: 20,000

29 January 1938 Division A	Clyde	1–6	Celtic	Glasgow
				Stadium: Shawfield Stadium; Attendance: 15,000

5 February 1938 Division A	Celtic	4–0	Arbroath	Glasgow
				Stadium: Celtic Park; Attendance: 7,500

19 February 1938 Division A	St Johnstone	1–2	Celtic	Perth
				Stadium: Muirton Park; Attendance: 10,000

26 February 1938 Division A	Celtic	5–1	St Mirren	Glasgow
				Stadium: Celtic Park; Attendance: 10,000

12 March 1938 Division A	Partick Thistle	1–6	Celtic	Glasgow
				Stadium: Firhill Park; Attendance: 30,000

19 March 1938 Division A	Celtic	1–1	Kilmarnock	Glasgow
				Stadium: Celtic Park; Attendance: 7,000

26 March 1938 Division A	Celtic	1–1	Falkirk	Glasgow
				Stadium: Celtic Park; Attendance: 2,000

2 April 1938 Division A	Falkirk	3–0	Celtic	Falkirk
				Stadium: Brockville Park; Attendance: 9,000

9 April 1938 Division A	Celtic	4–1	Motherwell	Glasgow
				Stadium: Celtic Park; Attendance: 12,000

16 April 1938 Division A	Dundee	2–3	Celtic	Dundee
				Stadium: Dens Park; Attendance: 21,000

18 April 1938 Division A	Celtic	3–0	Dundee	Glasgow
				Stadium: Celtic Park; Attendance: 4,000

23 April 1938 Division A	St Mirren	1–3	Celtic	Paisley
				Stadium: St Mirren Park, Love Street; Attendance: 15,000

30 April 1938 Division A	Celtic	3–0	Hibernian	Glasgow
				Stadium: Celtic Park; Attendance: 5,000

=== Scottish Cup ===
22 January 1938 First round	Third Lanark	1–2	Celtic	Glasgow
				Stadium: Cathkin Park; Attendance: 45,335

12 February 1938 Second round	Celtic	5–0	Nithsdale Wanderers	Glasgow
				Stadium: Celtic Park; Attendance: 6,200

5 March 1938 Third round	Celtic	1–2	Kilmarnock	Glasgow
				Stadium: Celtic Park; Attendance: 39,389

=== Empire Exhibition Trophy ===
25 May 1938 Quarter-finals	Celtic	0–0	Sunderland	Glasgow
19:00 BST				Stadium: Ibrox Park; Attendance: 55,000; Referee: M. C. Hutton (Glasgow)

26 May 1938 Quarter-finals replay	Celtic	3–1	Sunderland	Glasgow
19:00 BST				Stadium: Ibrox Park; Attendance: 20,296; Referee: M. C. Hutton (Glasgow)

3 June 1938 Semi-finals	Celtic	1–0	Hearts	Glasgow
19:00 BST	Crum 70'	Report		Stadium: Ibrox Park; Attendance: 48,000; Referee: Dr AW Barton (England)

10 June 1938 Final	Celtic	1–0 (a.e.t.)	Everton	Glasgow
19:00 BST	Crum 95'	Report		Stadium: Ibrox Park; Attendance: 82,000; Referee: T. Thomson (England)
