= 1934–35 Celtic F.C. season =

Celtic
1934–35 season
- Manager: Willie Maley
- Stadium: Celtic Park
- Scottish First Division: 2nd
- Scottish Cup: 4th Round

The 1934–35 Scottish football season was Celtic's 47th season of competitive football, in which they competed in the Scottish First Division and the Scottish Cup.

Celtic notoriously narrowed the previous year's gap with defending champions Rangers, but in the end finished runners-up to the Govan club, 52 points to their neighbours' 55.

In the Scottish Cup, Celtic were eliminated by Aberdeen 3-1 away in the fourth round (quarter-finals).

== Competitions ==
=== Scottish First Division ===
==== League table ====
Pos	Team	Pld	W	D	L	GF	GA	GD	Pts
1	Rangers	38	25	5	8	96	46	+50	55
2	Celtic	38	24	4	10	92	45	+47	52
3	Hearts	38	20	10	8	87	51	+36	50
4	Hamilton Academical	38	19	10	9	87	67	+20	48
5	St Johnstone	38	18	10	10	66	46	+20	46

Source: RSSSF

==== Matches ====
11 August 1934 Division A	Celtic	4–1	Kilmarnock	Glasgow
				Stadium: Celtic Park; Attendance: 16,000

18 August 1934 Division A	Hearts	0–0	Celtic	Glasgow
				Stadium: Celtic Park; Attendance: 39,370

22 August 1934 Division A	Motherwell	1–0	Celtic	Motherwell
				Stadium: Fir Park; Attendance: 25,000

25 August 1935 Division A	Celtic	0–0	St Johnstone	Glasgow
				Stadium: Celtic Park; Attendance: 9,000

1 September 1934 Division A	Queen's Park	1–0	Celtic	Glasgow
				Stadium: Hampden Park; Attendance: 11,213

8 September 1934 Division A	Celtic	1–1	Rangers	Glasgow
				Stadium: Celtic Park; Attendance: 36,000

11 September 1934 Division A	Celtic	4–0	Hibernian	Glasgow
				Stadium: Celtic Park; Attendance: 15,000

15 September 1934 Division A	Hamilton Academical	4–2	Celtic	Hamilton
				Stadium: Douglas Park; Attendance: 15,000

22 September 1934 Division A	Celtic	4–1	Aberdeen	Glasgow
				Stadium: Celtic Park; Attendance: 6,000

29 September 1934 Division A	Albion Rovers	2–1	Celtic	Coatbridge
				Stadium: Cliftonhill; Attendance: 10,000

1 October 1934 Division A	Dundee	0–0	Celtic	Dundee
				Stadium: Dens Park; Attendance: 18,000

6 October 1934 Division A	Celtic	1–2	Queen of the South	Glasgow
				Stadium: Celtic Park; Attendance: 15,000

13 October 1934 Division A	Clyde	0–3	Celtic	Glasgow
				Stadium: Shawfield Stadium; Attendance: 25,000

20 October 1934 Division A	Partick Thistle	1–3	Celtic	Glasgow
				Stadium: Firhill Park; Attendance: 20,000

27 October 1934 Division A	Celtic	3–0	Dunfermline Athletic	Glasgow
				Stadium: Celtic Park; Attendance: 8,000

3 November 1935 Division A	Celtic	7–0	Ayr United	Glasgow
				Stadium: Celtic Park; Attendance: 12,000

10 November 1935 Division A	Falkirk	1–2	Celtic	Falkirk
				Stadium: Brockville Park; Attendance: 8,000

17 November 1934 Division A	Airdrieonians	0–2	Celtic	Airdrie
				Stadium: Broomfield Park; Attendance: 8,000

24 November 1934 Division A	Celtic	4–0	Dundee	Glasgow
				Stadium: Celtic Park; Attendance: 13,000

1 December 1934 Division A	St Mirren	2–4	Celtic	Paisley
				Stadium: St Mirren Park, Love Street; Attendance: 12,000

8 December 1934 Division A	Celtic	3–2	Motherwell	Glasgow
				Stadium: Celtic Park; Attendance: 32,000

15 December 1934 Division A	Hibernian	3–2	Celtic	Edinburgh
				Stadium: Easter Road; Attendance: 24,000

22 December 1934 Division A	Kilmarnock	2–3	Celtic	Kilmarnock
				Stadium: Rugby Park; Attendance: 15,000

25 December 1934 Division A	Celtic	4–1	Queen's Park	Glasgow
				Stadium: Celtic Park; Attendance: 20,000

29 December 1934 Division A	Celtic	4–2	Heart of Midlothian	Glasgow
				Stadium: Celtic Park; Attendance: 30,000

1 January 1935 Division A	Rangers	2–1	Celtic	Glasgow
				Stadium: Ibrox Park; Attendance: 83,000

5 January 1935 Division A	St Johnstone	0–1	Celtic	Perth
				Stadium: Muirton Park; Attendance: 12,000

12 January 1935 Division A	Celtic	3–1	Hamilton Academical	Glasgow
				Stadium: Celtic Park; Attendance: 25,000

19 January 1935 Division A	Aberdeen	2–0	Celtic	Aberdeen
				Stadium: Pittodrie Park; Attendance: 20,000

2 February 1935 Division A	Celtic	5–1	Albion Rovers	Glasgow
				Stadium: Celtic Park; Attendance: 12,000

16 February 1935 Division A	Queen of the South	3–4	Celtic	Dumfries
				Stadium: Palmerston Park; Attendance: 10,000

23 February 1935 Division A	Celtic	3–1	Partick Thistle	Glasgow
				Stadium: Celtic Park; Attendance: 8,000

2 March 1935 Division A	Celtic	0–2	Clyde	Glasgow
				Stadium: Celtic Park; Attendance: 5,000

16 March 1935 Division A	Dunfermline Athletic	1–3	Celtic	Dunfermline
				Stadium: East End Park; Attendance: 9,000

23 March 1935 Division A	Ayr United	1–0	Celtic	Ayr
				Stadium: Somerset Park; Attendance: 11,000

13 April 1936 Division A	Celtic	2–0	Airdrieonians	Glasgow
				Stadium: Celtic Park; Attendance: 5,000

17 April 1935 Division A	Celtic	7–3	Falkirk	Glasgow
				Stadium: Celtic Park; Attendance: 3,000

27 April 1935 Division A	Celtic	2–1	St Mirren	Glasgow
				Stadium: Celtic Park; Attendance: 4,000

=== Scottish Cup ===
26 January 1935 First round	Celtic	4–1	Montrose	Glasgow
				Stadium: Celtic Park

9 February 1935 Second round	Celtic	1–1	Partic Thistle	Glasgow
				Stadium: Celtic Park; Attendance: 54,180

13 February 1935 Second round replay	Partic Thistle	1–3	Celtic	Glasgow
				Stadium: Firhill Park; Attendance: 36,944

23 February 1935 Third round	Celtic	Bye into Round 4

9 March 1935 Fourth round	Aberdeen	3–1	Celtic	Aberdeen
				Stadium: Pittodrie Park
