= 1912–13 Celtic F.C. season =

Celtic
1912–13 season
- Manager: Willie Maley
- Stadium: Celtic Park
- Scottish First Division: 2nd
- Scottish Cup: Quarter-finalist

The 1912–13 Scottish football season was Celtic's 25th season of competitive football, in which they competed in the Scottish First Division. Celtic finished the league in 2nd place, as they had the year before. They lost to Hearts in the 4th round of the Scottish Cup and thus it was the first season since 1902–03 in which they failed to win any major domestic honour.

Celtic won the Glasgow Charity Cup this season.

== Competitions ==
=== Scottish First Division ===
==== League table ====
| Pos | Team | Pld | W | D | L | GF | GA | GD | Pts |
|---|---|---|---|---|---|---|---|---|---|
| 1 | Rangers (C) | 34 | 24 | 5 | 5 | 76 | 41 | +35 | 53 |
| 2 | Celtic | 34 | 22 | 5 | 7 | 53 | 28 | +25 | 49 |
| =3 | Heart of Midlothian | 34 | 17 | 7 | 10 | 71 | 43 | +28 | 41 |
| =3 | Airdrieonians | 34 | 15 | 11 | 8 | 64 | 46 | +18 | 41 |
| 5 | Falkirk | 34 | 14 | 12 | 8 | 56 | 38 | +18 | 40 |

Source: "1912-1913 Division 1 - SPFL Archive". SPFL.
(C) Champions

==== Matches ====
| 17 August 1912 First Division | Falkirk | 0–0 | Celtic | Falkirk |
| | | | | Stadium: Brockville Park; Attendance: 10,000 |

| 24 August 1912 First Division | Celtic | 1–1 | Hibernian | Glasgow |
| | | | | Stadium: Celtic Park; Attendance: 15,000 |

| 31 August 1912 First Division | Kilmarnock | 0–2 | Celtic | Kilmarnock |
| | | | | Stadium: Rugby Park; Attendance: 9,000 |

| 7 September 1912 First Division | Celtic | 2–0 | Aberdeen | Glasgow |
| | | | | Stadium: Celtic Park; Attendance: 12,000 |

| 14 September 1912 First Division | Airdrieonians | 1–4 | Celtic | Airdrie |
| | | | | Stadium: Broomfield Park; Attendance: 15,000 |

| 21 September 1912 First Division | Dundee | 3–1 | Celtic | Dundee |
| | | | | Stadium: Dens Park; Attendance: 20,000 |

| 30 September 1912 First Division | Partick Thistle | 2–3 | Celtic | Glasgow |
| | | | | Stadium: Firhill Park; Attendance: 12,000 |

| 5 October 1912 First Division | Celtic | 1–0 | Morton | Glasgow |
| | | | | Stadium: Celtic Park; Attendance: 23,000 |

| 19 October 1912 First Division | Raith Rovers | 2–1 | Celtic | Kirkcaldy |
| | | | | Stadium: Stark's Park; Attendance: 10,000 |

| 26 October 1912 First Division | Celtic | 3–2 | Rangers | Glasgow |
| | | | | Stadium: Celtic Park; Attendance: 45,000 |

| 2 November 1912 First Division | Third Lanark | 0–1 | Celtic | Glasgow |
| | | | | Stadium: Cathkin Park; Attendance: 18,000 |

| 9 November 1912 First Division | Celtic | 1–0 | Hearts | Glasgow |
| | | | | Stadium: Celtic Park; Attendance: 13,000 |

| 16 November 1912 First Division | Queen's Park | 0–1 | Celtic | Glasgow |
| | | | | Stadium: Hampden Park; Attendance: 13,000 |

| 23 November 1912 First Division | Celtic | 1–2 | Motherwell | Glasgow |
| | | | | Stadium: Celtic Park; Attendance: 8,000 |

| 30 November 1912 First Division | Clyde | 1–1 | Celtic | Glasgow |
| | | | | Stadium: Shawfield Stadium; Attendance: 10,000 |

| 7 December 1912 First Division | Celtic | 2–1 | Hamilton Academical | Glasgow |
| | | | | Stadium: Celtic Park; Attendance: 6,000 |

| 14 December 1912 First Division | Morton | 1–2 | Celtic | Greenock |
| | | | | Stadium: Cappielow Park; Attendance: 11,000 |

| 21 December 1912 First Division | Celtic | 2–0 | Dundee | Glasgow |
| | | | | Stadium: Celtic Park; Attendance: 8,000 |

| 28 December 1912 First Division | St Mirren | 1–3 | Celtic | Paisley |
| | | | | Stadium: St Mirren Park, Love Street; Attendance: 12,000 |

| 1 January 1913 First Division | Rangers | 0–1 | Celtic | Glasgow |
| | | | | Stadium: Ibrox Park; Attendance: 67,000 |

| 2 January 1913 First Division | Celtic | 3–0 | Clyde | Glasgow |
| | | | | Stadium: Celtic Park; Attendance: 18,000 |

| 4 January 1913 First Division | Celtic | 1–0 | Partick Thistle | Glasgow |
| | | | | Stadium: Celtic Park; Attendance: 15,000 |

| 11 January 1913 First Division | Celtic | 1–0 | Queen's Park | Glasgow |
| | | | | Stadium: Celtic Park; Attendance: 9,000 |

| 18 January 1913 First Division | Hibernian | 1–0 | Celtic | Edinburgh |
| | | | Easter Road | Attendance: 14,000 |

| 25 January 1913 First Division | Celtic | 1–1 | Airdrieonians | Glasgow |
| | | | | Stadium: Celtic Park; Attendance: 12,000 |

| 1 February 1913 First Division | Celtic | 2–0 | Third Lanark | Glasgow |
| | | | | Stadium: Celtic Park; Attendance: 7,000 |

| 15 February 1913 First Division | Aberdeen | 3–0 | Celtic | Aberdeen |
| | | | | Stadium: Pittodrie Park; Attendance: 12,000 |

| 15 March 1913 First Division | Motherwell | 1–0 | Celtic | Motherwell |
| | | | | Stadium: Fir Park; Attendance: 10,000 |

| 22 March 1913 First Division | Celtic | 1–2 | Falkirk | Glasgow |
| | | | | Stadium: Celtic Park; Attendance: 18,000 |

| 24 March 1913 First Division | Celtic | 4–1 | Raith Rovers | Glasgow |
| | | | | Stadium: Celtic Park; Attendance: 15,000 |

| 29 March 1913 First Division | Celtic | 4–1 | Kilmarnock | Glasgow |
| | | | | Stadium: Celtic Park; Attendance: 8,000 |

| 5 April 1913 First Division | Celtic | 2–1 | St Mirren | Glasgow |
| | | | | Stadium: Celtic Park; Attendance: 14,000 |

| 21 April 1913 First Division | Hearts | 0–0 | Celtic | Edinburgh |
| | | | | Stadium: Tynecastle Park; Attendance: 5,000 |

| 26 April 1913 First Division | Hamilton Academical | 0–1 | Celtic | Hamilton |
| | | | | Stadium: Douglas Park; Attendance: 4,000 |

=== Inter City Midweek League ===
| 16 October 1912 Inter City Midweek Football League | Hibernian | 2–3 | Celtic | Edinburgh |
| | | | | Stadium: Easter Road |

| 23 October 1912 Inter City Midweek Football League | Celtic | 0–2 | Dundee | Glasgow |
| | | | | Stadium: Celtic Park |

| 30 October 1912 Inter City Midweek Football League | Dundee | 1–1 | Celtic | Dundee |
| | | | | Stadium: Dens Park |

| 5 November 1912 Inter City Midweek Football League | Rangers | 4–0 | Celtic | Glasgow |
| | | | | Stadium: Ibrox Park; Attendance: 5,000 |

=== Scottish Cup ===
| 8 February 1913 Second round | Celtic | 4–0 | Arbroath | Glasgow |
| | | | | Stadium: Celtic Park; Attendance: 9,000 |

| 22 February 1913 Third round | Celtic | 3–0 | Peebles Rovers | Glasgow |
| | | | | Stadium: Celtic Park; Attendance: 6,000 |

| 8 March 1913 Fourth round | Celtic | 0–1 | Hearts | Glasgow |
| | | | | Stadium: Celtic Park; Attendance: 66,000 |
