= 1915–16 Celtic F.C. season =

Celtic
1915–16 season
- Manager: Willie Maley
- Stadium: Celtic Park
- Scottish First Division: 1st

The 1915–16 Scottish football season was Celtic's 28th season of competitive football, in which they competed in the Scottish First Division. Celtic won the League for the third year in a row, by eleven points over nearest rival Rangers. The Scottish Cup was not played for the second consecutive year because of the Great War.

Celtic won both the Glasgow Cup and the Glasgow Merchants' Charity Cup.

== Competitions ==
=== Scottish First Division ===
==== League table ====
Pos	Team	Pld	W	D	L	GF	GA	GD	Pts
1	Celtic (C)	38	32	3	3	116	23	+93	67
2	Rangers	38	25	6	7	87	39	+48	56
3	Morton	37	22	7	8	86	35	+51	51
4	Ayr United	38	20	8	10	72	45	+27	48
5	Heart of Midlothian	37	20	6	11	66	45	+21	46

Source: "1915-1916 SFL - SPFL Archive". SPFL.
(C) Champions

==== Matches ====
21 August 1915 First Division	Celtic	3–1	Motherwell	Glasgow
				Stadium: Celtic Park; Attendance: 16,000

28 August 1915 First Division	Airdrieonians	0–5	Celtic	Airdrie
				Stadium: Broomfield Park; Attendance: 6,000

4 September 1915 First Division	Celtic	2–1	Falkirk	Glasgow
				Stadium: Celtic Park; Attendance: 16,000

11 September 1915 First Division	Morton	0–1	Celtic	Greenock
				Stadium: Cappielow Park; Attendance: 10,000

18 September 1915 First Division	Dundee	0–2	Celtic	Dundee
				Stadium: Dens Park; Attendance: 12,000

27 September 1915 First Division	Celtic	5–0	Clyde	Glasgow
				Stadium: Celtic Park; Attendance: 14,000

2 October 1915 First Division	Hibernian	0–4	Celtic	Edinburgh
				Stadium: Easter Road; Attendance: 12,000

16 October 1915 First Division	Hamilton Academical	2–3	Celtic	Hamilton
				Stadium: Douglas Park; Attendance: 14,000

23 October 1915 First Division	Celtic	0–2	St Mirren	Glasgow
				Stadium: Celtic Park; Attendance: 6,000

30 October 1915 First Division	Rangers	3–0	Celtic	Glasgow
				Stadium: Ibrox Park; Attendance: 45,000

6 November 1915 First Division	Celtic	3–1	Aberdeen	Glasgow
				Stadium: Celtic Park; Attendance: 7,000

13 November 1916 First Division	Hearts	2–0	Celtic	Edinburgh
				Stadium: Tynecastle Park; Attendance: 16,500

20 November 1915 First Division	Celtic	2–0	Kilmarnock	Glasgow
				Stadium: Celtic Park; Attendance: 4,000

27 November 1915 First Division	Raith Rovers	0–2	Celtic	Kirkcaldy
				Stadium: Stark's Park; Attendance: 5,000

4 December 1915 First Division	Celtic	6–2	Queen's Park	Glasgow
				Stadium: Celtic Park; Attendance: 6,000

11 December 1915 First Division	Ayr United	0–4	Celtic	Ayr
				Stadium: Somerset Park; Attendance: 4,000

18 December 1915 First Division	Partick Thistle	0–4	Celtic	Glasgow
				Stadium: Firhill Park; Attendance: 22,000

25 December 1915 First Division	Celtic	6–0	Airdrieonains	Glasgow
				Stadium: Celtic Park; Attendance: 8,000

1 January 1916 First Division	Celtic	2–2	Rangers	Glasgow
				Stadium: Celtic Park; Attendance: 40,000

3 January 1916 First Division	Clyde	1–3	Celtic	Glasgow
				Stadium: Shawfield Stadium; Attendance: 12,000

8 January 1916 First Division	Dumbarton	1–2	Celtic	Dumbarton
				Stadium: Boghead Park; Attendance: 7,000

15 January 1916 First Division	Celtic	3–1	Hibernian	Glasgow
				Stadium: Celtic Park; Attendance: 6,000

22 January 1916 First Division	Third Lanark	0–4	Celtic	Glasgow
				Stadium: Cathkin Park; Attendance: 10,000

29 January 1916 First Division	Celtic	3–1	Ayr United	Glasgow
				Stadium: Celtic Park; Attendance: 12,000

5 February 1916 First Division	Aberdeen	0–4	Celtic	Aberdeen
				Stadium: Pittodrie Park; Attendance: 12,000

12 February 1916 First Division	Celtic	6–0	Dumbarton	Glasgow
				Stadium: Celtic Park; Attendance: 6,000

19 February 1916 First Division	Queen's Park	0–1	Celtic	Glasgow
				Stadium: Hampden Park; Attendance: 15,000

26 February 1916 First Division	Celtic	3–0	Dundee	Glasgow
				Stadium: Celtic Park; Attendance: 10,000

4 March 1916 First Division	Kilmarnock	0–3	Celtic	Kilmarnock
				Stadium: Rugby Park; Attendance: 10,000

11 March 1916 First Division	Celtic	5–1	Hamilton Academical	Glasgow
				Stadium: Celtic Park; Attendance: 7,000

18 March 1916 First Division	St Mirren	0–5	Celtic	Paisley
				Stadium: St Mirren Park, Love Street; Attendance: 6,000

1 April 1916 First Division	Celtic	0–0	Morton	Glasgow
				Stadium: Celtic Park; Attendance: 16,000

8 April 1916 First Division	Falkirk	0–2	Celtic	Falkirk
				Stadium: Brockville Park; Attendance: 8,000

15 April 1916 First Division	Celtic	6–0	Raith Rovers	Glasgow
				Stadium: Celtic Park; Attendance: 10,000

15 April 1916 First Division	Motherwell	1–3	Celtic	Motherwell
				Stadium: Fir Park; Attendance: 6,000

22 April 1916 First Division	Celtic	0–0	Hearts	Glasgow
				Stadium: Celtic Park; Attendance: 18,000

24 April 1916 First Division	Celtic	4–1	Third Lanark	Glasgow
				Stadium: Celtic Park; Attendance: 4,000

30 April 1916 First Division	Celtic	5–0	Partick Thistle	Glasgow
				Stadium: Celtic Park; Attendance: 18,000

=== Friendly ===
21 May 1916	Scottish League XI	1–0	Celtic	Glasgow
	Jock Simpson			Stadium: Hampden Park; Attendance: 30,000; Referee: A. Allan

- Charity fundraising match between the Scottish League winners and the 'Rest of the League'.
