= 1958–59 Celtic F.C. season =

Celtic
1958–59 season
- Manager: Jimmy McGrory
- Stadium: Celtic Park
- Scottish Division One: 6th
- Scottish Cup: Semi-finalists
- Scottish League Cup: Semi-finalists

During the 1958–59 Scottish football season, Celtic competed in Scottish Division One.

== Competitions ==
=== Scottish Division One ===
==== League table ====
Pos	Team	Pld	W	D	L	GF	GA	GR	Pts
4	Dundee	34	16	9	9	61	51	1.196	41
5	Airdrieonians	34	15	7	12	64	62	1.032	37
6	Celtic	34	14	8	12	70	53	1.321	36
7	St Mirren	34	14	7	13	71	74	0.959	35
8	Kilmarnock	34	13	8	13	58	51	1.137	34

Source: RSSSF

==== Matches ====
20 August 1958 Division One	Clyde	2–1	Celtic	Glasgow
19:30 GMT				Stadium: Shawfield Stadium; Attendance: 20,000

6 September 1958 Division One	Celtic	2–2	Rangers	Glasgow
15:00				Stadium: Celtic Park; Attendance: 50,000

13 September 1958 Division One	Kilmarnock	1–4	Celtic	Kilmarnock
15:00				Stadium: Rugby Park; Attendance: 22,286

20 September 1958 Division One	Celtic	3–1	Raith Rovers	Glasgow
15:00 GMT				Stadium: Celtic Park; Attendance: 30,000

27 September 1958 Division One	Aberdeen	3–1	Celtic	Aberdeen
15:00 BST				Stadium: Pittodrie Park; Attendance: 20,000

4 October 1958 Division One	Celtic	3–1	Queen of the South	Glasgow
15:00 BST				Stadium: Celtic Park; Attendance: 15,000

11 October 1958 Division One	Celtic	3–4	Falkirk	Glasgow
15:00 BST				Stadium: Celtic Park; Attendance: 23,000

18 October 1958 Division One	Airdrieonians	1–4	Celtic	Airdrie
15:00 BST				Stadium: Broomfield Park; Attendance: 16,000

25 October 1958 Division One	Celtic	3–1	Third Lanark	Glasgow
15:00 BST				Stadium: Celtic Park; Attendance: 22,000

1 November 1958 Division One	Dundee	1–1	Celtic	Dundee
15:00 BST				Stadium: Dens Park; Attendance: 22,500

8 November 1958 Division One	Dunfermline Athletic	1–0	Celtic	Dunfermline
15:00 GMT				Stadium: East End Park; Attendance: 16,500

15 November 1958 Division One	Celtic	3–3	St Mirren	Glasgow
15:00 GMT				Stadium: Celtic Park; Attendance: 17,000

22 November 1958 Division One	Partick Thistle	2–0	Celtic	Glasgow
15:00 GMT				Stadium: Firhill Park; Attendance: 24,794

29 November 1958 Division One	Hibernian	3–2	Celtic	Edinburgh
15:00 GMT				Stadium: Easter Road; Attendance: 22,000

6 December 1959 Division One	Celtic	2–0	Motherwell	Glasgow
15:00 GMT		Abandoned 82mins for Fog		Stadium: Celtic Park; Attendance: 26,000; Referee: R Morris (Falkirk)

13 December 1958 Division One	Celtic	7–3	Stirling Albion	Glasgow
15:00 GMT				Stadium: Celtic Park; Attendance: 13,000

20 December 1958 Division One	Hearts	1–1	Celtic	Edinburgh
15:00 GMT				Stadium: Tynecastle Park; Attendance: 30,000

27 December 1958 Division One	Celtic	3–1	Clyde	Glasgow
15:00 GMT				Stadium: Celtic Park; Attendance: 20,000

1 January 1959 Division One	Rangers	2–1	Celtic	Glasgow
14:00 GMT				Stadium: Ibrox Park; Attendance: 55,000

2 January 1959 Division One	Celtic	3–3	Motherwell	Glasgow
14:15 GMT				Stadium: Celtic Park; Attendance: 36,000

21 January 1959 Division One	Celtic	2–0	Kilmarnock	Glasgow
14:45 GMT				Stadium: Celtic Park; Attendance: 8,000

24 January 1959 Division One	Queen of the South	2–2	Celtic	Dumfries
15:00 GMT				Stadium: Palmerston Park; Attendance: 7,500

7 February 1959 Division One	Falkirk	3–2	Celtic	Falkirk
15:00 GMT				Stadium: Brockville Park; Attendance: 11,500

21 February 1959 Division One	Third Lanark	1–1	Celtic	Glasgow
15:00 GMT				Stadium: Cathkin Park; Attendance: 18,000

4 March 1959 Division One	Celtic	1–1	Dundee	Glasgow
16:15 GMT				Stadium: Celtic Park; Attendance: 7,500

7 March 1959 Division One	Celtic	3–1	Dunfermline Athletic	Glasgow
15:00 GMT				Stadium: Celtic Park; Attendance: 14,000

10 March 1959 Division One	Celtic	1–2	Airdrieonians	Glasgow
15:00 GMT				Stadium: Celtic Park; Attendance: 4,000

18 March 1959 Division One	St Mirren	1–0	Celtic	Paisley
19:30 GMT				Stadium: St Mirren Park, Love Street; Attendance: 20,000

21 March 1959 Division One	Celtic	2–0	Partick Thistle	Glasgow
15:00 GMT				Stadium: Celtic Park; Attendance: 15,000

25 March 1959 Division One	Celtic	4–0	Aberdeen	Glasgow
15:00 BST				Stadium: Celtic Park; Attendance: 6,000

28 March 1959 Division One	Celtic	3–0	Hibernian	Glasgow
15:00 GMT				Stadium: Celtic Park; Attendance: 17,000

6 April 1959 Division One	Raith Rovers	3–1	Celtic	Kirkcaldy
19:30 BST				Stadium: Stark's Park; Attendance: 8,000

8 April 1959 Division One	Motherwell	2–0	Celtic	Motherwell
19:30 BST				Stadium: Fir Park; Attendance: 10,000

11 April 1959 Division One	Stirling Albion	0–1	Celtic	Stirling
15:00 BST				Stadium: Annfield; Attendance: 7,500

18 April 1959 Division One	Celtic	2–1	Hearts	Glasgow
15:00 BST				Stadium: Celtic Park; Attendance: 19,500

=== Scottish Cup ===
31 January 1959 First round	Celtic	4–0	Albion Rovers	Glasgow
15:00 GMT				Stadium: Celtic Park; Attendance: 27,000

18 February 1959 Second round	Celtic	1–1	Clyde	Glasgow
15:00 GMT				Stadium: Celtic Park; Attendance: 32,500

23 February 1959 Second round replay	Clyde	3–4	Celtic	Glasgow
17:30 GMT				Stadium: Shawfield Stadium; Attendance: 26,087

28 February 1959 Third round	Celtic	2–1	Rangers	Glasgow
15:00 GMT				Stadium: Celtic Park; Attendance: 42,000

14 March 1959 Fourth round	Stirling Albion	1–3	Celtic	Stirling
15:00 GMT				Stadium: Annfield; Attendance: 28,600

4 April 1959 Semi-final	Celtic	0–4	St Mirren	Glasgow
15:00 GMT				Stadium: Hampden Park; Attendance: 79,385

=== Scottish League Cup ===
9 August 1958 Group 8	Clyde	1–4	Celtic	Glasgow
15:00 GMT				Stadium: Shawfield Stadium; Attendance: 26,500

13 August 1958 Group 8	Celtic	3–3	Airdrieonians	Glasgow
19:00 GMT				Stadium: Celtic Park; Attendance: 35,000

16 August 1958 Group 8	Celtic	3–0	St Mirren	Glasgow
15:00 GMT				Stadium: Celtic Park; Attendance: 35,000

23 August 1958 Group 8	Celtic	2–0	Clyde	Glasgow
15:00 GMT				Stadium: Celtic Park; Attendance: 39,000

27 August 1958 Group 8	Airdrieonians	1–2	Celtic	Airdrie
19:30 GMT				Stadium: Broomfield Park; Attendance: 15,000

30 August 1958 Group 8	St Mirren	6–3	Celtic	Paisley
15:00 GMT				Stadium: St Mirren Park, Love Street; Attendance: 27,000

10 September 1958 Quarter-final 1st leg	Celtic	2–0	Cowdenbeath	Glasgow
18:15 GMT				Stadium: Celtic Park; Attendance: 15,000

17 September 1958 Quarter-final 2nd leg	Cowdenbeath	1–8	Celtic	Cowdenbeath
17:40 GMT				Stadium: Central Park; Attendance: 10,000

1 October 1958 Semi-final	Partick Thisle	2–1	Celtic	Glasgow
19:30 GMT				Stadium: Ibrox Park; Attendance: 45,000
