= 1950–51 Celtic F.C. season =

Celtic
1950–51 season
- Manager: Jimmy McGrory
- Stadium: Celtic Park
- Scottish Division A: 7th
- Scottish Cup: First round
- Scottish League Cup: Quarter-final

During the 1950–51 Scottish football season, Celtic competed in Scottish Division A.

== Competitions ==
=== Scottish Division A ===
==== League table ====
Pos	Team	Pld	W	D	L	GF	GA	GD	Pts
5	Aberdeen	30	15	5	10	61	50	+11	35
6	Partick Thistle	30	13	7	10	57	48	+9	33
7	Celtic	30	12	5	13	48	46	+2	29
8	Raith Rovers	30	13	2	15	52	52	0	28
9	Motherwell	30	11	6	13	58	65	−7	28

Source: RSSSF

==== Matches ====
9 September 1950 Division A	Celtic	3–4	Morton	Glasgow
15:00 GMT				Stadium: Celtic Park; Attendance: 50,000

23 September 1950 Division A	Celtic	3–2	Rangers	Glasgow
				Stadium: Celtic Park; Attendance: 53,789

30 September 1950 Division A	Raith Rovers	1–2	Celtic	Kirkcaldy
				Stadium: Stark's Park; Attendance: 13,500

7 October 1950 Division A	Celtic	2–3	Raith Rovers	Glasgow
				Stadium: Celtic Park; Attendance: 20,000

14 October 1950 Division A	Aberdeen	2–1	Celtic	Aberdeen
				Stadium: Pittodrie Park; Attendance: 30,000

21 October 1950 Division A	Celtic	0–0	Dundee	Glasgow
				Stadium: Celtic Park; Attendance: 30,000

28 October 1950 Division A	Morton	0–2	Celtic	Greenock
				Stadium: Cappielow Park; Attendance: 20,000

4 November 1950 Division A	Clyde	1–3	Celtic	Glasgow
				Stadium: Shawfield Stadium; Attendance: 23,000

11 November 1950 Division A	Celtic	3–0	Falkirk	Glasgow
15:00 GMT				Stadium: Celtic Park; Attendance: 11,000

18 November 1950 Division A	Airdrieonians	2–4	Celtic	Airdrie
				Stadium: Broomfield Park; Attendance: 18,000

25 November 1950 Division A	Celtic	1–1	Third Lanark	Glasgow
				Stadium: Celtic Park; Attendance: 15,000

2 December 1950 Division A	Partick Thistle	0–1	Celtic	Glasgow
				Stadium: Firhill Park; Attendance: 38,000

9 December 1950 Division A	St Mirren	0–0	Celtic	Paisley
				Stadium: St Mirren Park, Love Street; Attendance: 29,500

16 December 1950 Division A	Celtic	6–2	East Fife	Glasgow
				Stadium: Celtic Park; Attendance: 18,000

30 December 1950 Division A	Celtic	2–2	Hearts	Glasgow
				Stadium: Celtic Park; Attendance: 40,000

1 January 1951 Division A	Rangers	1–0	Celtic	Glasgow
				Stadium: Ibrox Park; Attendance: 55,000

6 January 1951 Division A	Motherwell	2–1	Celtic	Edinburgh
				Stadium: Tynecastle Park; Attendance: 25,500

13 January 1951 Division A	Celtic	3–4	Aberdeen	Glasgow
				Stadium: Celtic Park; Attendance: 50,000

20 January 1951 Division A	Dundee	3–1	Celtic	Dundee
				Stadium: Dens Park; Attendance: 28,000

3 February 1951 Division A	Celtic	0–1	Hibernian	Glasgow
				Stadium: Celtic Park; Attendance: 60,000

17 February 1951 Division A	Falkirk	0–2	Celtic	Falkirk
				Stadium: Brockville Park; Attendance: 12,000

3 March 1951 Division A	Third Lanark	2–0	Celtic	Glasgow
				Stadium: Cathkin Park; Attendance: 40,000

17 March 1951 Division A	Celtic	2–1	St Mirren	Glasgow
				Stadium: Celtic Park; Attendance: 30,000

24 March 1951 Division A	East Fife	3–0	Celtic	Methil
				Stadium: Bayview Park; Attendance: 13,000

7 April 1952 Division A	Hearts	1–1	Celtic	Edinburgh
				Stadium: Tynecastle Park; Attendance: 14,242

11 April 1951 Division A	Celtic	0–1	Airdrieonians	Glasgow
				Stadium: Celtic Park; Attendance: 10,000

16 April 1951 Division A	Celtic	0–3	Partick Thistle	Glasgow
				Stadium: Celtic Park; Attendance: 10,000

25 April 1951 Division A	Celtic	3–1	Motherwell	Glasgow
				Stadium: Celtic Park; Attendance: 10,000

28 April 1951 Division A	Celtic	1–0	Clyde	Glasgow
15:00 BST				Stadium: Celtic Park; Attendance: 24,000

30 April 1951 Division A	Hibernian	3–1	Celtic	Edinburgh
				Stadium: Easter Road; Attendance: 22,000

=== Scottish Cup ===
27 January 1951 First round	East Fife	2–2	Celtic	Glasgow
				Stadium: Bayview; Attendance: 22,000

31 January 1951 First round replay	Celtic	4–2	East Fife	Glasgow
				Stadium: Celtic Park; Attendance: 36,185

10 February 1951 Second round	Celtic	4–0	Duns	Glasgow
				Stadium: Celtic Park; Attendance: 22,907

24 February 1951 Third round	Hearts	1–2	Celtic	Edinburgh
				Stadium: Tynecastle Park; Attendance: 47,672

10 March 1951 Fourth round	Celtic	3–0	Aberdeen	Glasgow
				Stadium: Celtic Park; Attendance: 75,000

31 March 1951 Semi-final	Celtic	3–2	Raith Rovers	Glasgow
				Stadium: Hampden Park; Attendance: 83,019

21 April 1951 Final	Celtic	1–0	Motherwell	Glasgow
				Stadium: Hampden Park; Attendance: 132,180

=== Scottish League Cup ===
12 August 1950 Group 8	Celtic	2–0	East Fife	Glasgow
				Stadium: Celtic Park; Attendance: 60,000

16 August 1950 Group 8	Third Lanark	1–2	Celtic	Glasgow
				Stadium: Cathkin Park; Attendance: 40,000

19 August 1950 Group 8	Celtic	2–1	Raith Rovers	Glasgow
				Stadium: Celtic Park; Attendance: 36,000

26 August 1950 Group 8	East Fife	1–1	Celtic	Methil
				Stadium: Bayview Park; Attendance: 17,500

30 August 1950 Group 8	Celtic	3–1	Third Lanark	Glasgow
				Stadium: Celtic Park; Attendance: 30,000

2 September 1950 Group 8	Raith Rovers	2–2	Celtic	Kirkcaldy
				Stadium: Stark's Park; Attendance: 16,000

16 September 1950 Quarter-final 1st leg	Celtic	1–4	Motherwell	Glasgow
				Stadium: Celtic Park; Attendance: 50,000

20 September 1950 Quarter-final 2nd leg	Motherwell	0–1	Celtic	Motherwell
				Stadium: Fir Park; Attendance: 29,000
