= 1928–29 Celtic F.C. season =

Celtic
1928–29 season
- Manager: Willie Maley
- Stadium: Celtic Park
- Scottish First Division: 2nd
- Scottish Cup: Semi-final

The 1928–29 Scottish football season was Celtic's 41st season of competitive football, in which they competed in the Scottish First Division and the Scottish Cup.

In the league, Celtic finished second to Rangers, same as the previous season. In the Scottish Cup they reached the semi-final stage, in which they lost to eventual champions Kilmarnock, 1-0.

This was captain Willie McStay's last season with the club as he was sold to Hearts afterwards. He would be replaced as Celtic captain by his younger brother Jimmy.

== Competitions ==
=== Scottish First Division ===
==== League table ====
Pos	Team	Pld	W	D	L	GF	GA	GD	Pts
1	Rangers	38	30	7	1	107	32	+75	67
2	Celtic	38	22	7	9	67	44	+23	51
3	Motherwell	38	20	10	8	85	66	+19	50
4	Heart of Midlothian	38	19	9	10	91	57	+34	47
5	Queen's Park	38	18	7	13	100	69	+31	43

==== Matches ====
11 August 1928 First Division	Dundee	0–1	Celtic	Dundee
				Stadium: Dens Park; Attendance: 19,000

18 August 1928 First Division	Celtic	4–1	Airdrieonians	Glasgow
				Stadium: Celtic Park; Attendance: 10,000

25 August 1928 First Division	Ayr United	0–2	Celtic	Ayr
				Stadium: Somerset Park; Attendance: 16,000

8 September 1928 First Division	Celtic	3–0	Kilmarnock	Glasgow
				Stadium: Celtic Park; Attendance: 18,000

15 September 1928 First Division	Cowdenbeath	0–1	Celtic	Cowdenbeath
				Stadium: Central Park; Attendance: 7,000

22 September 1928 First Division	Celtic	0–3	St Mirren	Glasgow
				Stadium: Celtic Park; Attendance: 10,000

29 September 1928 First Division	Hamilton Academical	1–1	Celtic	Hamilton
				Stadium: Douglas Park; Attendance: 14,000

13 October 1928 First Division	Motherwell	3–3	Celtic	Motherwell
				Stadium: Fir Park; Attendance: 22,000

20 October 1928 First Division	Celtic	1–2	Rangers	Glasgow
				Stadium: Celtic Park; Attendance: 35,000

27 October 1928 First Division	Queen's Park	4–4	Celtic	Glasgow
				Stadium: Hampden Park; Attendance: 20,000

3 November 1928 First Division	Celtic	3–1	Raith Rovers	Glasgow
				Stadium: Celtic Park; Attendance: 7,000

10 November 1928 First Division	Aberdeen	2–2	Celtic	Aberdeen
				Stadium: Pittodrie Park; Attendance: 15,500

17 November 1928 First Division	Celtic	4–0	Clyde	Glasgow
				Stadium: Celtic Park; Attendance: 10,000

24 November 1928 First Division	Third Lanark	0–2	Celtic	Glasgow
				Stadium: Cathkin Park; Attendance: 15,000

1 December 1928 First Division	Celtic	0–0	St Johnstone	Glasgow
				Stadium: Celtic Park; Attendance: 5,000

8 December 1928 First Division	Falkirk	3–0	Celtic	Falkirk
				Stadium: Brockville Park; Attendance: 10,000

15 December 1928 First Division	Celtic	1–0	Hearts	Glasgow
				Stadium: Celtic Park; Attendance: 14,000

22 December 1928 First Division	Airdrieonians	0–1	Celtic	Airdrie
				Stadium: Broomfield Park; Attendance: 7,000

29 December 1929 First Division	Celtic	2–1	Dundee	Glasgow
				Stadium: Celtic Park; Attendance: 10,000

1 January 1929 First Division	Rangers	3–0	Celtic	Glasgow
				Stadium: Ibrox Park; Attendance: 60,000

5 January 1929 First Division	Celtic	3–0	Ayr United	Glasgow
				Stadium: Celtic Park; Attendance: 8,500

12 January 1929 First Division	Partick Thistle	3–0	Celtic	Glasgow
				Stadium: Firhill; Attendance: 12,000

26 January 1929 First Division	Hearts	2–1	Celtic	Edinburgh
				Stadium: Tynecastle Park; Attendance: 23,500

9 February 1929 First Division	St Mirren	0–1	Celtic	Paisley
				Stadium: St Mirren Park, Love Street; Attendance: 12,000

12 February 1929 First Division	Celtic	1–0	Cowdenbeath	Glasgow
				Stadium: Celtic Park; Attendance: 6,000

19 February 1929 First Division	Celtic	3–0	Hamilton Academical	Glasgow
				Stadium: Celtic Park; Attendance: 8,000

23 February 1929 First Division	Hibernian	2–1	Celtic	Edinburgh
				Stadium: Easter Road; Attendance: 10,000

9 March 1929 First Division	Raith Rovers	1–4	Celtic	Kirkcaldy
				Stadium: Stark's Park; Attendance: 4,000

16 March 1929 First Division	Celtic	2–2	Aberdeen	Glasgow
				Stadium: Celtic Park; Attendance: 6,000

19 March 1929 First Division	Celtic	2–0	Motherwell	Glasgow
				Stadium: Celtic Park; Attendance: 4,000

26 March 1929 First Division	Clyde	0–1	Celtic	Glasgow
				Stadium: Shawfield Stadium; Attendance: 10,000

30 March 1929 First Division	Celtic	3–1	Third Lanark	Glasgow
				Stadium: Shawfield Stadium; Attendance: 8,000

1 April 1929 First Division	Celtic	1–0	Partick Thistle	Glasgow
				Stadium: Celtic Park; Attendance: 11,000

6 April 1929 First Division	St Johnstone	1–1	Celtic	Perth
				Stadium: Muirton Park; Attendance: 6,000

13 April 1929 First Division	Celtic	1–4	Hibernian	Glasgow
				Stadium: Celtic Park; Attendance: 10,000

17 April 1929 First Division	Celtic	1–2	Queen's Park	Glasgow
				Stadium: Celtic Park; Attendance: 8,000

20 April 1929 First Division	Celtic	3–0	Falkirk	Glasgow
				Stadium: Celtic Park; Attendance: 6,000

27 April 1929 First Division	Kilmarnock	2–3	Celtic	Kilmarnock
				Stadium: Rugby Park; Attendance: 6,300

=== Scottish Cup ===
19 January 1929 First round	Celtic	5–1	Arthurlie	Glasgow
				Stadium: Celtic Park; Attendance: 8,000

2 February 1929 Second round	Celtic	3–0	East Stirlingshire	Glasgow
				Stadium: Celtic Park; Attendance: 7,600

16 February 1929 Third round	Celtic	4–1	Arbroath	Glasgow
				Stadium: Celtic Park; Attendance: 7,000

6 March 1929 Third round	Celtic	0–0	Motherwell	Glasgow
				Stadium: Celtic Park; Attendance: 47,000

13 March 1929 Third round replay	Motherwell	1–2	Celtic	Motherwell
				Stadium: Fir Park; Attendance: 32,000

23 March 1929 Semi-final	Kilmarnock	1–0	Celtic	Glasgow
				Stadium: Ibrox Park; Attendance: 40,000

== See also ==
- Glasgow Dental Hospital Cup
