= 1951–52 Celtic F.C. season =

Celtic
1951–52 season
- Manager: Jimmy McGrory
- Stadium: Celtic Park
- Scottish Division A: 9th
- Scottish Cup: First round
- Scottish League Cup: Semi-final
- Saint Mungo Cup: Winners

During the 1951–52 Scottish football season, Celtic competed in Scottish Division A. They finished the season in 9th place with 28 points.

== Competitions ==
=== Scottish Division A ===
==== League table ====
Pos	Team	Pld	W	D	L	GF	GA	GD	Pts
7	Motherwell	30	12	7	11	51	57	−6	31
8	Dundee	30	11	6	13	53	52	+1	28
9	Celtic	30	10	8	12	52	55	−3	28
10	Queen of the South	30	10	8	12	50	60	−10	28
11	Aberdeen	30	10	7	13	65	58	+7	27

Source: RSSSF

==== Matches ====
8 September 1951 Division A	Motherwell	2–2	Celtic	Motherwell
15:00 GMT				Stadium: Fir Park; Attendance: 28,000

22 September 1951 Division A	Rangers	1–1	Celtic	Glasgow
15:00				Stadium: Ibrox Park; Attendance: 86,000

29 September 1951 Division A	Celtic	1–3	Hearts	Glasgow
15:00				Stadium: Celtic Park; Attendance: 48,000

10 October 1951 Division A	Morton	0–1	Celtic	Greenock
15:00 GMT				Stadium: Cappielow Park; Attendance: 10,000

20 October 1951 Division A	Dundee	2–1	Celtic	Dundee
14:45 BST				Stadium: Dens Park; Attendance: 32,000

27 October 1951 Division A	Celtic	1–1	Hibernian	Glasgow
15:00 BST				Stadium: Celtic Park; Attendance: 50,000

3 November 1951 Division A	Celtic	2–2	Third Lanark	Glasgow
15:00 BST				Stadium: Celtic Park; Attendance: 35,000

10 November 1951 Division A	Stirling Albion	2–1	Celtic	Stirling
14:45 BST				Stadium: Annfield; Attendance: 18,205

17 November 1951 Division A	Celtic	3–1	Airdrieonians	Glasgow
15:00 GMT				Stadium: Celtic Park; Attendance: 30,000

24 November 1951 Division A	Queen of the South	4–0	Celtic	Dumfries
14:30 GMT				Stadium: Palmerston Park; Attendance: 14,500

1 December 1951 Division A	Celtic	2–1	Partick Thistle	Glasgow
15:00 GMT				Stadium: Celtic Park; Attendance: 30,000

8 December 1951 Division A	Celtic	2–1	St Mirren	Glasgow
15:00 GMT				Stadium: Celtic Park; Attendance: 20,000

15 December 1951 Division A	East Fife	3–1	Celtic	Methil
14:15 GMT				Stadium: Bayview Park; Attendance: 16,000

22 December 1951 Division A	Celtic	2–2	Motherwell	Glasgow
14:15 GMT				Stadium: Celtic Park; Attendance: 28,000

29 December 1951 Division A	Aberdeen	3–4	Celtic	Aberdeen
15:00 GMT				Stadium: Pittodrie Park; Attendance: 22,000

1 January 1952 Division A	Celtic	1–4	Rangers	Glasgow
14:15 GMT				Stadium: Celtic Park; Attendance: 45,000

2 January 1952 Division A	Hearts	2–1	Celtic	Edinburgh
14:00 GMT				Stadium: Tynecastle Park; Attendance: 37,197

12 January 1952 Division A	Raith Rovers	1–0	Celtic	Kirkcaldy
15:00 GMT				Stadium: Stark's Park; Attendance: 16,000

19 January 1952 Division A	Celtic	1–1	Dundee	Glasgow
15:00 GMT				Stadium: Celtic Park; Attendance: 35,000

2 February 1952 Division A	Hibernian	3–1	Celtic	Edinburgh
15:00 GMT				Stadium: Easter Road; Attendance: 42,000

16 February 1952 Division A	Celtic	3–1	Stirling Albion	Glasgow
15:00 GMT				Stadium: Celtic Park; Attendance: 20,000

23 February 1952 Division A	Celtic	0–1	Raith Rovers	Glasgow
15:00 GMT				Stadium: Celtic Park; Attendance: 22,000

27 February 1952 Division A	Airdireonians	2–1	Celtic	Airdrie
15:00 GMT				Stadium: Broomfield Park; Attendance: 10,000

1 March 1952 Division A	Celtic	6–1	Queen of the South	Glasgow
15:00 GMT				Stadium: Celtic Park; Attendance: 30,000

5 March 1952 Division A	Celtic	2–2	Morton	Glasgow
15:00 GMT				Stadium: Celtic Park; Attendance: 12,000

8 March 1952 Division A	Partick Thistle	2–4	Celtic	Glasgow
15:00 GMT				Stadium: Firhill Park; Attendance: 30,000

15 March 1952 Division A	St Mirren	3–1	Celtic	Paisley
15:00 BST				Stadium: St Mirren Park, Love Street; Attendance: 37,000

22 March 1952 Division A	Celtic	2–1	East Fife	Glasgow
15:00 BST				Stadium: Celtic Park; Attendance: 30,000

29 March 1952 Division A	Celtic	2–0	Aberdeen	Glasgow
15:00 BST				Stadium: Celtic Park; Attendance: 18,000

12 April 1952 Division A	Third Lanark	3–3	Celtic	Glasgow
15:00 BST				Stadium: Cathkin Park; Attendance: 35,000

=== Scottish Cup ===
30 January 1952 First round	Celtic	0–0	Third Lanark	Glasgow
15:00 GMT				Stadium: Celtic Park; Attendance: 23,000

4 February 1952 First round replay	Third Lanark	2–1	Celtic	Glasgow
15:00 GMT				Stadium: Cathkin Park; Attendance: 27,334

=== Scottish League Cup ===
11 August 1951 Group 8	Celtic	1–1	Third Lanark	Glasgow
15:00 GMT				Stadium: Celtic Park; Attendance: 45,000

15 August 1951 Group 8	Airdrieonians	1–1	Celtic	Airdrie
15:00 GMT				Stadium: Broomfield Park; Attendance: 24,000

18 August 1951 Group 8	Celtic	2–0	Morton	Glasgow
15:00 GMT				Stadium: Celtic Park; Attendance: 40,000

25 August 1951 Group 8	Third Lanark	0–1	Celtic	Glasgow
18:45 GMT				Stadium: Cathkin Park; Attendance: 35,000

29 August 1951 Group 8	Celtic	2–0	Airdrieonians	Glasgow
15:00 GMT				Stadium: Celtic Park; Attendance: 25,000

1 September 1951 Group 8	Morton	2–0	Celtic	Greenock
15:00 GMT				Stadium: Cappielow Park; Attendance: 21,000

15 September 1951 Quarter-final 1st leg	Celtic	4–1	Forfar Athletic	Glasgow
15:00 GMT				Stadium: Celtic Park; Attendance: 28,000

19 September 1951 Quarter-final 2nd leg	Forfar Athletic	1–1	Celtic	Forfar
15:00 GMT				Stadium: Station Park; Attendance: 21,000

13 October 1951 Semi-final	Celtic	0–3	Rangers	Glasgow
15:00 GMT				Stadium: Hampden Park; Attendance: 82,050
