= 1939–40 Celtic F.C. season =

Celtic
1939–40 season
- Manager: Willie Maley to February); Jimmy McStay (from February)
- Stadium: Celtic Park
- Emergency League Western Division: 13th
- Scottish First Division: suspended due to war
- War Emergency Cup: First round

During the 1939–40 Scottish football season, Celtic competed in the Scottish First Division.

== Competitions ==
=== Scottish First Division ===
12 August 1939 Division One	Aberdeen	3–1	Celtic	Aberdeen
				Stadium: Pittodrie Park; Attendance: 30,000

19 August 1939 Division One	Celtic	2–0	Hearts	Glasgow
				Stadium: Celtic Park; Attendance: 30,000

23 August 1939 Division One	Celtic	1–3	Aberdeen	Glasgow
				Stadium: Celtic Park; Attendance: 25,000

26 August 1939 Division One	Cowdenbeath	1–2	Celtic	Cowdenbeath
				Stadium: Central Park; Attendance: 15,000

2 September 1939 Division One	Celtic	1–0	Clyde	Glasgow
				Stadium: Celtic Park; Attendance: 5,000

=== Western Division ===
==== League table ====
Pos	Team	Pld	W	D	L	GF	GA	GD	Pts
11	Partick Thistle	30	10	6	14	57	74	−17	26
12	Third Lanark	30	10	5	15	53	78	−25	25
13	Celtic	30	9	6	15	55	61	−6	24
14	Queen's Park	30	7	7	16	55	82	−27	21
15	Ayr United	30	7	5	18	50	66	−16	19

==== Matches ====
21 October 1939 Western Division	Celtic	3–4	Hamilton Academical	Glasgow
				Stadium: Celtic Park

28 October 1939 Western Division	Clyde	2–0	Celtic	Glasgow
				Stadium: Shawfield Stadium

4 November 1939 Western Division	Celtic	0–3	Queen of the South	Glasgow
				Stadium: Celtic Park

11 November 1939 Western Division	Morton	1–1	Celtic	Greenock
				Stadium: Cappielow Park

18 November 1939 Western Division	Celtic	1–1	Kilmarnock	Glasgow
				Stadium: Celtic Park

25 November 1939 Western Division	Albion Rovers	3–2	Celtic	Coatbridge
				Stadium: Cliftonhill

2 December 1939 Western Division	Celtic	2–1	St Mirren	Glasgow
				Stadium: Celtic Park

9 December 1939 Western Division	Partick Thistle	4–2	Celtic	Glasgow
				Stadium: Firhill Park; Attendance: 3,500

16 December 1939 Western Division	Celtic	1–2	Third Lanark	Glasgow
				Stadium: Celtic Park

23 December 1939 Western Division	Dumbarton	1–5	Celtic	Glasgow
				Stadium: Boghead Park

30 December 1939 Western Division	Celtic	2–2	Motherwell	Glasgow
				Stadium: Celtic Park

1 January 1940 Western Division	Rangers	1–1	Celtic	Glasgow
				Stadium: Celtic Park; Attendance: 40,000

6 January 1940 Western Division	Airdrieonians	0–1	Celtic	Airdrie
				Stadium: Broomfield Park

13 January 1940 Western Division	Celtic	1–3	Ayr United	Glasgow
				Stadium: Celtic Park

10 February 1940 Western Division	Celtic	0–3	Morton	Glasgow
				Stadium: Celtic Park

17 February 1940 Western Division	Kilmarnock	3–2	Celtic	Kilmarnock
				Stadium: Rugby Park

9 March 1940 Western Division	Celtic	1–1	Partick Thistle	Glasgow
				Stadium: Celtic Park

16 March 1940 Western Division	Third Lanark	4–2	Celtic	Glasgow
				Stadium: Cathkin Park

23 March 1940 Western Division	Celtic	4–0	Dumbarton	Glasgow
				Stadium: Celtic Park

25 March 1940 Western Division	Queen's Park	1–4	Celtic	Glasgow
				Stadium: Hampden Park

30 March 1940 Western Division	Motherwell	2–0	Celtic	Motherwell
				Stadium: Fir Park

3 April 1940 Western Division	Hamilton Academical	5–0	Celtic	Hamilton
				Stadium: Douglas Park

6 April 1940 Western Division	Celtic	1–2	Rangers	Glasgow
				Stadium: Celtic Park; Attendance: 30,000

9 April 1940 Western Division	Celtic	4–1	Clyde	Glasgow
				Stadium: Shawfield Stadium

13 April 1940 Western Division	Celtic	4–4	Queen's Park	Glasgow
				Stadium: Celtic Park

17 April 1940 Western Division	Queen of the South	1–3	Celtic	Dumfries
				Stadium: Palmerston Park

20 April 1940 Western Division	Celtic	4–2	Airdrieonians	Glasgow
				Stadium: Celtic Park

23 April 1940 Western Division	Celtic	3–1	Albion Rovers	Glasgow
				Stadium: Celtic Park

27 April 1940 Western Division	Ayr United	1–0	Celtic	Ayr
				Stadium: Somerset Park

4 May 1940 Western Division	St Mirren	2–1	Celtic	Paisley
				Stadium: St Mirren Park, Love Street

=== War Emergency Cup ===
24 February 1940 First round first leg	Celtic	4–2	Raith Rovers	Glasgow
				Stadium: Celtic Park; Attendance: 6,201

2 March 1940 First round second leg	Raith Rovers	3–0	Celtic	Kirkcaldy
				Stadium: Stark's Park; Attendance: 5,463
