= 1929–30 Celtic F.C. season =

Celtic
1929–30 season
- Manager: Willie Maley
- Stadium: Celtic Park
- Scottish First Division: 4th
- Scottish Cup: Third round

The 1929–30 Scottish football season was Celtic's 42nd season of competitive football, in which they competed in the Scottish First Division and the Scottish Cup.

It was Celtic's third consecutive season without a major domestic honour, a dry spell the club had not known since the early 1900s. They finished the league a distant fourth to Rangers. In the Scottish Cup, they saw defeat to St. Mirren in the third round, 1-3 at Celtic Park.

This season was Jimmy McStay's first as Celtic captain, immediately succeeding his older brother Willie. McStay, who had been playing for Celtic since 1920, would later be club manager from 1940 to 1945.

== Competitions ==
=== Scottish First Division ===
==== League table ====
Pos	Team	Pld	W	D	L	GF	GA	GD	Pts
2	Motherwell	38	25	5	8	104	48	+56	55
3	Aberdeen	38	23	7	8	85	61	+24	53
4	Celtic	38	22	5	11	88	46	+42	49
5	St Mirren	38	18	5	15	73	56	+17	41
6	Partick Thistle	38	16	9	13	72	61	+11	41

Source: "1929-1930 Division 1 - SPFL Archive". SPFL.

==== Matches ====
10 August 1929 First Division	Celtic	2–1	Hearts	Glasgow
				Stadium: Celtic Park; Attendance: 35,000

17 August 1929 First Division	Morton	1–2	Celtic	Greenock
				Stadium: Cappielow Park; Attendance: 18,000

24 August 1929 First Division	Celtic	3–4	Aberdeen	Glasgow
				Stadium: Celtic Park; Attendance: 20,000

31 August 1929 First Division	Hamilton Academical	2–3	Celtic	Hamilton
				Stadium: Douglas Park; Attendance: 12,000

14 September 1929 First Division	Airdrieonians	0–1	Celtic	Airdrie
				Stadium: Broomfield Park; Attendance: 24,000

21 September 1929 First Division	Celtic	1–1	Dundee	Glasgow
				Stadium: Celtic Park; Attendance: 6,000

28 September 1929 First Division	Ayr United	1–3	Celtic	Ayr
				Stadium: Somerset Park; Attendance: 12,000

5 October 1929 First Division	Celtic	7–0	Falkirk	Glasgow
				Stadium: Celtic Park; Attendance: 10,000

19 October 1929 First Division	Celtic	2–1	Queen's Park	Glasgow
				Stadium: Celtic Park; Attendance: 20,000

23 October 1929 First Division	Dundee United	2–2	Celtic	Dundee
				Stadium: Tannadice Park; Attendance: 6,000

26 October 1929 First Division	Rangers	1–0	Celtic	Glasgow
				Stadium: Ibrox Park; Attendance: 50,000

2 November 1929 First Division	Celtic	4–0	Hibernian	Glasgow
				Stadium: Celtic Park; Attendance: 12,000

9 November 1929 First Division	Motherwell	2–1	Celtic	Motherwell
				Stadium: Fir Park; Attendance: 20,000

16 November 1929 First Division	Celtic	2–1	Cowdenbeath	Glasgow
				Stadium: Celtic Park; Attendance: 8,000

23 November 1929 First Division	St Johnstone	1–6	Celtic	Perth
				Stadium: Muirton Park; Attendance: 10,000

30 November 1929 First Division	Partick Thistle	3–2	Celtic	Glasgow
				Stadium: Firhill Park; Attendance: 10,000

7 December 1929 First Division	Celtic	3–0	St Mirren	Glasgow
				Stadium: Celtic Park; Attendance: 5,000

14 December 1929 First Division	Kilmarnock	1–1	Celtic	Kilmarnock
				Stadium: Rugby Park; Attendance: 7,000

21 December 1929 First Division	Hearts	1–3	Celtic	Edinburgh
				Stadium: Tynecastle Park; Attendance: 22,000

28 December 1930 First Division	Celtic	0–1	Morton	Glasgow
				Stadium: Celtic Park; Attendance: 5,000

1 January 1930 First Division	Celtic	1–2	Rangers	Glasgow
				Stadium: Celtic Park; Attendance: 40,000

2 January 1930 First Division	Queen's Park	2–1	Celtic	Glasgow
				Stadium: Hampden Park; Attendance: 25,000

4 January 1930 First Division	Aberdeen	3–1	Celtic	Aberdeen
				Stadium: Pittodrie Park; Attendance: 22,000

25 January 1930 First Division	Clyde	2–3	Celtic	Glasgow
				Stadium: Shawfield Stadium; Attendance: 15,000

5 February 1930 First Division	Celtic	1–2	Airdrieonians	Glasgow
				Stadium: Celtic Park; Attendance: 4,000

8 February 1930 First Division	Dundee	2–2	Celtic	Dundee
				Stadium: Dens Park; Attendance: 10,000

18 February 1930 First Division	Celtic	4–0	Ayr United	Glasgow
				Stadium: Celtic Park; Attendance: 4,000

22 February 1930 First Division	Falkirk	0–1	Celtic	Falkirk
				Stadium: Brockville Park; Attendance: 32,000

1 March 1930 First Division	Celtic	7–0	Dundee United	Glasgow
				Stadium: Celtic Park; Attendance: 7,000

8 March 1930 First Division	Hibernian	0–2	Celtic	Edinburgh
				Stadium: Easter Road; Attendance: 11,000

15 March 1930 First Division	Celtic	0–4	Motherwell	Glasgow
				Stadium: Celtic Park; Attendance: 10,000

22 March 1930 First Division	Cowdenbeath	1–2	Celtic	Cowdenbeath
				Stadium: Central Park; Attendance: 5,000

29 March 1930 First Division	Celtic	6–2	St Johnstone	Glasgow
				Stadium: Celtic Park; Attendance: 4,000

5 April 1930 First Division	Celtic	2–0	Partick Thistle	Glasgow
				Stadium: Celtic Park; Attendance: 10,000

12 April 1930 First Division	St Mirren	0–0	Celtic	Paisley
				Stadium: St Mirren Park, Love Street; Attendance: 7,000

15 April 1930 First Division	Celtic	3–0	Hamilton Academical	Glasgow
				Stadium: Celtic Park; Attendance: 4,000

19 April 1930 First Division	Celtic	4–0	Kilmarnock	Glasgow
				Stadium: Celtic Park; Attendance: 4,000

21 April 1930 First Division	Celtic	0–2	Clyde	Glasgow
				Stadium: Celtic Park; Attendance: 6,000

=== Scottish Cup ===
18 January 1930 First round	Caledonian	0–6	Celtic	Inverness
				Stadium: Telford Street Park; Attendance: 6,500

1 February 1930 Second round	Celtic	5–0	Arbroath	Glasgow
				Stadium: Celtic Park; Attendance: 6,500

15 February 1930 Third round	Celtic	1–3	St Mirren	Glasgow
				Stadium: Celtic Park; Attendance: 32,000
