= 1959–60 Celtic F.C. season =

Celtic
1959–60 season
- Manager: Jimmy McGrory
- Stadium: Celtic Park
- Scottish Division One: 9th
- Scottish Cup: Semi-finalists
- Scottish League Cup: Group stage

During the 1959–60 Scottish football season, Celtic competed in Scottish Division One.

== Competitions ==
=== Scottish Division One ===
==== League table ====
Pos	Team	Pld	W	D	L	GF	GA	GR	Pts	Qualification or relegation
7	Hibernian	34	14	7	13	106	85	1.247	35	Invited for the Inter-Cities Fairs Cup
8	Ayr United	34	14	6	14	65	73	0.890	34	
9	Celtic	34	12	9	13	73	59	1.237	33	
10	Partick Thistle	34	14	4	16	54	78	0.692	32	
11	Raith Rovers	34	14	3	17	64	62	1.032	31	

Source: RSSSF

==== Matches ====
19 August 1959 Division One	Celtic	2–0	Kilmarnock	Glasgow
19:00 GMT				Stadium: Celtic Park; Attendance: 18,000

5 September 1959 Division One	Rangers	3–1	Celtic	Glasgow
15:00				Stadium: Ibrox Park; Attendance: 65,000

12 September 1959 Division One	Celtic	3–4	Hearts	Glasgow
15:00				Stadium: Celtic Park; Attendance: 36,000

19 September 1959 Division One	Raith Rovers	0–3	Celtic	Kirkcaldy
15:00 GMT				Stadium: Stark's Park; Attendance: 13,000

26 September 1959 Division One	Celtic	1–1	Clyde	Glasgow
15:00 BST				Stadium: Celtic Park; Attendance: 27,000

3 October 1959 Division One	Arbroath	0–5	Celtic	Arbroath
15:00 BST				Stadium: Gayfield Park; Attendance: 10,135

10 October 1959 Division One	Celtic	1–1	Aberdeen	Glasgow
15:00 BST				Stadium: Celtic Park; Attendance: 25,000

17 October 1959 Division One	Third Lanark	4–2	Celtic	Glasgow
15:00 BST				Stadium: Cathkin Park; Attendance: 22,000

24 October 1959 Division One	Celtic	5–1	Motherwell	Glasgow
15:00 BST				Stadium: Celtic Park; Attendance: 25,000

31 October 1959 Division One	Hibernian	3–3	Celtic	Edinburgh
15:00 BST				Stadium: Easter Road; Attendance: 28,000

7 November 1959 Division One	Celtic	2–3	Ayr United	Glasgow
15:00 GMT				Stadium: Celtic Park; Attendance: 23,000

14 November 1959 Division One	Celtic	4–2	Dunfermline Athletic	Glasgow
15:00 GMT				Stadium: Celtic Park; Attendance: 16,000

21 November 1959 Division One	Stirling Albion	2–2	Celtic	Stirling
15:00 GMT				Stadium: Annfield; Attendance: 8,326

28 November 1959 Division One	Partick Thistle	3–1	Celtic	Glasgow
15:00 GMT				Stadium: Firhill Park; Attendance: 22,000

5 December 1959 Division One	Celtic	2–3	Dundee	Glasgow
15:00 GMT				Stadium: Celtic Park; Attendance: 12,000

12 December 1959 Division One	Celtic	0–0	Airdrieonians	Glasgow
15:00 GMT				Stadium: Celtic Park; Attendance: 13,000

19 December 1959 Division One	St Mirren	0–3	Celtic	Paisley
15:00 GMT				Stadium: St Mirren Park, Love Street; Attendance: 19,000

26 December 1959 Division One	Kilmarnock	2–1	Celtic	Kilmarnock
15:00 GMT				Stadium: Rugby Park; Attendance: 15,948

1 January 1960 Division One	Celtic	0–1	Rangers	Glasgow
15:00 GMT				Stadium: Celtic Park; Attendance: 50,000

2 January 1960 Division One	Heart of Midlothian	3–1	Celtic	Edinburgh
15:00 GMT				Stadium: Tynecastle Park; Attendance: 26,000

9 January 1960 Division One	Celtic	1–0	Raith Rovers	Glasgow
15:00 GMT				Stadium: Celtic Park; Attendance: 18,000

16 January 1960 Division One	Clyde	3–3	Celtic	Glasgow
15:00 GMT				Stadium: Shawfield Stadium; Attendance: 22,000

23 January 1960 Division One	Celtic	4–0	Arbroath	Glasgow
15:00 GMT				Stadium: Celtic Park; Attendance: 16,000

6 February 1960 Division One	Aberdeen	3–2	Celtic	Aberdeen
15:00 GMT				Stadium: Pittodrie Park; Attendance: 14,000

7 March 1960 Division One	Celtic	1–0	Hibernian	Glasgow
19:30 GMT				Stadium: Celtic Park; Attendance: 19,000

16 March 1960 Division One	Ayr United	1–1	Celtic	Ayr
19:30 GMT				Stadium: Somerset Park; Attendance: 8,000

19 March 1960 Division One	Dunfermline Athletic	3–2	Celtic	Dunfermline
15:00 GMT				Stadium: East End Park; Attendance: 8,000

21 March 1960 Division One	Motherwell	1–2	Celtic	Motherwell
19:30 GMT				Stadium: Fir Park; Attendance: 11,808

26 March 1960 Division One	Celtic	1–1	Stirling Albion	Glasgow
15:00 BST				Stadium: Celtic Park; Attendance: 12,000

28 March 1960 Division One	Celtic	4–0	Third Lanark	Glasgow
19:30 GMT				Stadium: Celtic Park; Attendance: 8,000

12 April 1960 Division One	Celtic	2–4	Partick Thistle	Glasgow
19:30 BST				Stadium: Celtic Park; Attendance: 22,000

16 April 1960 Division One	Dundee	2–0	Celtic	Dundee
15:00 BST				Stadium: Dens Park; Attendance: 16,000

18 April 1960 Division One	Airdireonians	2–5	Celtic	Airdrie
15:00 BST				Stadium: Broomfield Park; Attendance: 4,000

30 April 1960 Division One	Celtic	3–3	St Mirren	Glasgow
15:00 BST				Stadium: Celtic Park; Attendance: 10,000

=== Scottish Cup ===
13 February 1960 Second round	St Mirren	1–1	Celtic	Paisley
15:00 GMT				Stadium: St Mirren Park, Love Street; Attendance: 36,200

24 February 1960 Second round replay	Celtic	4–4	St Mirren	Glasgow
19:30 GMT				Stadium: Celtic Park; Attendance: 38,000

29 February 1960 Second round 2nd Replay	Celtic	5–2	St Mirren	Glasgow
19:30 GMT				Stadium: Celtic Park; Attendance: 51,000

5 March 1960 Third round	Elgin City	1–2	Celtic	Elgin
15:00 GMT				Stadium: Borough Briggs; Attendance: 11,207

12 March 1960 Fourth round	Celtic	2–0	Partick Thistle	Glasgow
15:00 GMT				Stadium: Celtic Park; Attendance: 41,000

2 April 1960 Semi-final	Rangers	1–1	Celtic	Glasgow
15:00 GMT				Stadium: Hampden Park; Attendance: 79,768

6 April 1960 Semi-final replay	Rangers	4–1	Celtic	Glasgow
19:30 GMT				Stadium: Hampden Park; Attendance: 72,710

=== Scottish League Cup ===
8 August 1959 Group 8	Raith Rovers	2–1	Celtic	Kirkcaldy
15:00 GMT				Stadium: Stark's Park; Attendance: 16,000

12 August 1959 Group 8	Celtic	1–2	Partick Thistle	Glasgow
19:00 GMT				Stadium: Celtic Park; Attendance: 25,000

15 August 1959 Group 8	Airdrieonians	4–2	Celtic	Glasgow
15:00 GMT				Stadium: Broomfield Park; Attendance: 15,000

22 August 1959 Group 8	Celtic	1–0	Raith Rovers	Glasgow
15:00 GMT				Stadium: Celtic Park; Attendance: 24,000

26 August 1959 Group 8	Partick Thistle	0–2	Celtic	Glasgow
18:45 GMT				Stadium: Firhill Park; Attendance: 20,000

29 August 1959 Group 8	Celtic	2–2	Airdrieonians	Glasgow
15:00 GMT				Stadium: Celtic Park; Attendance: 24,500
