= 1955–56 Celtic F.C. season =

Celtic
1955–56 season
- Manager: Jimmy McGrory
- Stadium: Celtic Park
- Scottish Division One: 5th
- Scottish Cup: Finalists
- Scottish League Cup: Group stage

During the 1955–56 Scottish football season, Celtic competed in Scottish Division One.

== Competitions ==
=== Scottish Division One ===
==== League table ====
Pos	Team	Pld	W	D	L	GF	GA	GR	Pts
3	Heart of Midlothian	34	19	7	8	99	47	2.106	45
4	Hibernian	34	19	7	8	86	50	1.720	45
5	Celtic	34	16	9	9	55	39	1.410	41
6	Queen of the South	34	16	5	13	69	73	0.945	37
7	Airdrieonians	34	14	8	12	85	96	0.885	36

Source: RSSSF

==== Matches ====
10 September 1955 Division One	Falkirk	3–1	Celtic	Falkirk
15:00 GMT				Stadium: Brockville Park; Attendance: 12,000

17 September 1955 Division One	Celtic	3–0	Stirling Albion	Glasgow
15:00				Stadium: Celtic Park; Attendance: 14,000

24 September 1955 Division One	Rangers	0–0	Celtic	Glasgow
15:00				Stadium: Ibrox Park; Attendance: 47,000

1 October 1955 Division One	Celtic	2–0	Raith Rovers	Glasgow
15:00 GMT				Stadium: Celtic Park; Attendance: 15,000

8 October 1955 Division One	Hearts	2–1	Celtic	Edinburgh
14:45 BST				Stadium: Tynecastle Park; Attendance: 31,000

15 October 1955 Division One	Celtic	2–2	Motherwell	Glasgow
15:00 BST				Stadium: Celtic Park; Attendance: 22,000

22 October 1955 Division One	Clyde	1–3	Celtic	Glasgow
14:30 BST				Stadium: Shawfield Stadium; Attendance: 28,000

29 October 1955 Division One	Celtic	4–2	Dunfermline Athletic	Glasgow
15:00 BST				Stadium: Celtic Park; Attendance: 23,000

5 November 1955 Division One	Celtic	0–0	East Fife	Glasgow
14:45 BST				Stadium: Celtic Park; Attendance: 27,000

12 November 1955 Division One	Dundee	1–2	Celtic	Dundee
15:00 GMT				Stadium: Dens Park; Attendance: 23,000

19 November 1955 Division One	Celtic	3–0	St Mirren	Glasgow
14:30 GMT				Stadium: Celtic Park; Attendance: 29,000

26 November 1955 Division One	Airdrieonians	1–2	Celtic	Airdrie
15:00 GMT				Stadium: Broomfield Park; Attendance: 17,500

3 December 1955 Division One	Stirling Albion	0–3	Celtic	Stirling
15:00 GMT				Stadium: Annfield; Attendance: 11,000

10 December 1955 Division One	Celtic	0–2	Kilmarnock	Glasgow
14:15 GMT				Stadium: Celtic Park; Attendance: 15,000

17 December 1955 Division One	Celtic	5–1	Partick Thistle	Glasgow
14:15 GMT				Stadium: Celtic Park; Attendance: 20,500

24 December 1955 Division One	Hibernian	2–3	Celtic	Edinburgh
15:00 GMT				Stadium: Easter Road; Attendance: 32,000

31 December 1955 Division One	Queen of the South	1–3	Celtic	Dumfries
14:15 GMT				Stadium: Palmerston Park; Attendance: 12,500

2 January 1956 Division One	Celtic	0–1	Rangers	Glasgow
14:00 GMT				Stadium: Celtic Park; Attendance: 47,000

7 January 1956 Division One	Aberdeen	1–0	Celtic	Aberdeen
15:00 GMT				Stadium: Pittodrie Park; Attendance: 38,000

21 January 1956 Division One	Raith Rovers	1–1	Celtic	Kirkcaldy
15:00 GMT				Stadium: Stark's Park; Attendance: 16,000

28 January 1956 Division One	Celtic	1–1	Hearts	Glasgow
15:00 GMT				Stadium: Celtic Park; Attendance: 39,000

11 February 1956 Division One	Motherwell	2–2	Celtic	Motherwell
15:00 GMT				Stadium: Fir Park; Attendance: 19,000

25 February 1956 Division One	Celtic	4–1	Clyde	Glasgow
15:00 GMT				Stadium: Celtic Park; Attendance: 35,000

7 March 1956 Division One	Dunfermline Athletic	1–1	Celtic	Dunfermline
15:00 GMT				Stadium: East End Park; Attendance: 12,000

10 March 1956 Division One	East Fife	3–0	Celtic	Methil
15:00 GMT				Stadium: Bayview Park; Attendance: 12,000

17 March 1956 Division One	Celtic	1–0	Dundee	Glasgow
15:00 GMT				Stadium: Celtic Park; Attendance: 24,000

28 March 1956 Division One	St Mirren	0–2	Celtic	Paisley
16:00 GMT				Stadium: St Mirren Park, Love Street; Attendance: 10,000

31 March 1956 Division One	Celtic	3–1	Airdrieonians	Glasgow
15:00 GMT				Stadium: Celtic Park; Attendance: 20,000

10 April 1956 Division One	Celtic	1–1	Aberdeen	Glasgow
17:45 BST				Stadium: Celtic Park; Attendance: 14,000

13 April 1956 Division One	Kilmarnock	0–0	Celtic	Kilmarnock
19:30 GMT				Stadium: Rugby Park; Attendance: 13,000

23 April 1956 Division One	Partick Thistle	2–0	Celtic	Glasgow
15:00 BST				Stadium: Firhill Park; Attendance: 15,000

25 April 1956 Division One	Celtic	0–3	Hibernian	Glasgow
BST				Stadium: Celtic Park; Attendance: 9,500

28 April 1956 Division One	Celtic	1–3	Queen of the South	Glasgow
15:00 BST				Stadium: Celtic Park; Attendance: 9,000

30 April 1957 Division One	Celtic	1–0	Falkirk	Glasgow
19:00 BST				Stadium: Celtic Park; Attendance: 4,000

=== Scottish Cup ===
4 February 1956 Fifth round	Morton	0–2	Celtic	Greenock
15:00 GMT				Stadium: Cappielow Park; Attendance: 17,000

18 February 1956 Sixth Round	Ayr United	0–3	Celtic	Ayr
15:00 GMT				Stadium: Somerset Park; Attendance: 24,000

3 March 1956 Seventh Round	Celtic	2–1	Airdrieonians	Glasgow
15:00 GMT				Stadium: Celtic Park; Attendance: 59,000

24 March 1956 Semi-final	Celtic	2–1	Clyde	Glasgow
15:00 GMT				Stadium: Hampden Park; Attendance: 64,904

21 April 1956 Final	Hearts	3–1	Celtic	Glasgow
15:00 GMT				Stadium: Hampden Park; Attendance: 133,583

=== Scottish League Cup ===
13 August 1955 Group 8	Celtic	4–2	Queen of the South	Glasgow
15:00 GMT				Stadium: Celtic Park; Attendance: 40,000

17 August 1955 Group 8	Queen of the South	0–2	Celtic	Dumfries
19:00 GMT				Stadium: Palmerston Park; Attendance: 12,000

20 August 1955 Group 8	Celtic	5–1	Falkirk	Glasgow
15:00 GMT				Stadium: Celtic Park; Attendance: 40,000

27 August 1955 Group 8	Rangers	1–4	Celtic	Glasgow
18:45 GMT				Stadium: Ibrox Park; Attendance: 75,000

31 August 1955 Group 8	Celtic	0–4	Rangers	Glasgow
18:45 GMT				Stadium: Celtic Park; Attendance: 61,000

3 September 1955 Group 8	Falkirk	1–1	Celtic	Falkirk
15:00 GMT				Stadium: Brockville Park; Attendance: 17,000
