= 1954–55 Celtic F.C. season =

Scottish football season

Celtic
1954–55 season
- Manager: Jimmy McGrory
- Stadium: Celtic Park
- Scottish Division A: 2nd
- Scottish Cup: Finalists
- Scottish League Cup: Group stage

During the 1954–55 Scottish football season, Celtic competed in Scottish Division A.

== Competitions ==
=== Scottish Division A ===
==== League table ====
Pos	Team	Pld	W	D	L	GF	GA	GD	Pts	Qualification
1	Aberdeen (C)	30	24	1	5	73	26	+47	49	
2	Celtic	30	19	8	3	76	37	+39	46	
3	Rangers	30	19	3	8	67	33	+34	41	
4	Hearts	30	16	7	7	74	45	+29	39	
5	Hibernian	30	15	4	11	64	54	+10	34	Invitation for the European Cup first round

Source: RSSSF
(C) Champions

==== Matches ====
11 September 1954 Division A	Clyde	2–2	Celtic	Glasgow
15:00 GMT				Stadium: Shawfield Stadium; Attendance: 30,000

18 September 1954 Division A	Celtic	2–0	Rangers	Glasgow
15:00				Stadium: Celtic Park; Attendance: 45,000

25 September 1954 Division A	Raith Rovers	1–3	Celtic	Kirkcaldy
15:00				Stadium: Stark's Park; Attendance: 16,000

2 October 1954 Division A	Celtic	6–3	Kilmarnock	Glasgow
15:00 GMT				Stadium: Celtic Park; Attendance: 30,000

9 October 1954 Division A	Aberdeen	0–2	Celtic	Aberdeen
14:45 BST				Stadium: Pittodrie Park; Attendance: 38,000

16 October 1954 Division A	Celtic	1–1	Queen of the South	Glasgow
15:00 BST				Stadium: Celtic Park; Attendance: 22,000

30 October 1954 Division A	Celtic	3–1	Falkirk	Glasgow
15:00 BST				Stadium: Celtic Park; Attendance: 30,000

6 November 1954 Division A	St Mirren	1–1	Celtic	Paisley
14:45 BST				Stadium: St Mirren Park, Love Street; Attendance: 35,000

13 November 1954 Division A	Celtic	7–0	Stirling Albion	Glasgow
15:00 GMT				Stadium: Celtic Park; Attendance: 15,000

20 November 1954 Division A	Partick Thistle	4–2	Celtic	Glasgow
14:30 GMT				Stadium: Firhill Park; Attendance: 33,000

27 November 1954 Division A	Motherwell	2–2	Celtic	Motherwell
15:00 GMT				Stadium: Fir Park; Attendance: 20,000

4 December 1954 Division A	Celtic	2–2	East Fife	Glasgow
15:00 GMT				Stadium: Celtic Park; Attendance: 23,500

11 December 1954 Division A	Hibernian	0–5	Celtic	Edinburgh
14:15 GMT				Stadium: Easter Road; Attendance: 33,000

18 December 1954 Division A	Celtic	4–1	Dundee	Glasgow
14:15 GMT				Stadium: Celtic Park; Attendance: 14,000

25 December 1954 Division A	Celtic	2–2	Clyde	Glasgow
15:00 GMT				Stadium: Celtic Park; Attendance: 31,000

1 January 1955 Division A	Rangers	4–1	Celtic	Glasgow
14:15 GMT				Stadium: Ibrox Park; Attendance: 63,000

3 January 1955 Division A	Celtic	4–1	Raith Rovers	Glasgow
14:00 GMT				Stadium: Celtic Park; Attendance: 20,000

8 January 1955 Division A	Kilmarnock	1–2	Celtic	Kilmarnock
15:00 GMT				Stadium: Rugby Park; Attendance: 24,518

22 January 1955 Division A	Queen of the South	0–2	Celtic	Dumfries
15:00 GMT				Stadium: Palmerston Park; Attendance: 12,500

29 January 1955 Division A	Celtic	2–0	Hearts	Glasgow
15:00 GMT				Stadium: Celtic Park; Attendance: 49,300

12 February 1955 Division A	Falkirk	1–1	Celtic	Falkirk
15:00 GMT				Stadium: Brockville Park; Attendance: 20,223

26 February 1955 Division A	Celtic	5–2	St Mirren	Glasgow
15:00 GMT				Stadium: Celtic Park; Attendance: 36,000

9 March 1955 Division A	Stirling Albion	2–3	Celtic	Stirling
15:00 GMT				Stadium: Annfield; Attendance: 6,000

12 March 1955 Division A	Celtic	0–0	Partick Thistle	Glasgow
15:00 GMT				Stadium: Celtic Park; Attendance: 38,000

19 March 1955 Division A	Celtic	1–0	Motherwell	Glasgow
15:00 GMT				Stadium: Celtic Park; Attendance: 35,000

30 March 1955 Division A	East Fife	3–4	Celtic	Methil
15:00 GMT				Stadium: Bayview Park; Attendance: 8,000

2 April 1955 Division A	Celtic	1–2	Hibernian	Glasgow
15:00 BST				Stadium: Celtic Park; Attendance: 31,000

9 April 1955 Division A	Dundee	0–1	Celtic	Dundee
15:00 BST				Stadium: Dens Park; Attendance: 23,000

16 April 1955 Division A	Celtic	2–1	Aberdeen	Glasgow
15:00 BST				Stadium: Celtic Park; Attendance: 40,000

30 April 1955 Division A	Hearts	0–3	Celtic	Edinburgh
15:00 BST				Stadium: Tynecastle Park; Attendance: 22,000

=== Scottish Cup ===
5 February 1955 Fifth round	Alloa Athletic	2–4	Celtic	Alloa
15:00 GMT				Stadium: Recreation Park; Attendance: 14,567

19 February 1955 Sixth Round	Kilmarnock	1–1	Celtic	Kilmarnock
15:00 GMT				Stadium: Rugby Park; Attendance: 32,887

23 February 1955 Sixth Round replay	Celtic	1–0	Kilmarnock	Glasgow
15:00 GMT				Stadium: Celtic Park; Attendance: 40,000

5 March 1955 Seventh Round	Celtic	2–1	Hamilton Academical	Glasgow
15:00 GMT				Stadium: Celtic Park; Attendance: 49,000

26 March 1955 Semi-final	Airdrieonians	2–2	Celtic	Glasgow
15:00 GMT				Stadium: Hampden Park; Attendance: 88,526

4 April 1955 Semi-final replay	Airdrieonians	0–2	Celtic	Glasgow
16:15 GMT				Stadium: Hampden Park; Attendance: 71,351

23 April 1955 Final	Clyde	1–1	Celtic	Glasgow
15:00 GMT				Stadium: Hampden Park; Attendance: 106,283

27 April 1955 Final replay	Clyde	1–0	Celtic	Glasgow
18:30 GMT				Stadium: Hampden Park; Attendance: 68,801

=== Scottish League Cup ===
14 August 1954 Group 8	Celtic	3–0	Falkirk	Glasgow
15:00 GMT				Stadium: Celtic Park; Attendance: 46,000

18 August 1954 Group 8	Dundee	3–1	Celtic	Dundee
15:00 GMT				Stadium: Dens Park; Attendance: 28,000

21 August 1954 Group 8	Celtic	1–2	Heart of Midlothian	Glasgow
15:00 GMT				Stadium: Celtic Park; Attendance: 53,000

28 August 1954 Group 8	Falkirk	2–2	Celtic	Falkirk
15:00 GMT				Stadium: Brockville Park; Attendance: 18,000

1 September 1954 Group 8	Celtic	0–1	Dundee	Glasgow
18:45 GMT				Stadium: Celtic Park; Attendance: 30,000

4 September 1955 Group 8	Heart of Midlothian	3–2	Celtic	Edinburgh
15:00 GMT				Stadium: Tynecastle Park; Attendance: 32,000
