= 1930–31 Celtic F.C. season =

Celtic
1930–31 season
- Manager: Willie Maley
- Stadium: Celtic Park
- Scottish First Division: vice Champion
- Scottish Cup: Champion

The 1930–31 Scottish football season was Celtic's 43rd season of competitive football, in which they competed in the Scottish First Division and the Scottish Cup.

Despite much improvement in their league results, which saw them pile 58 points and an unbeaten run of 17 games from August to January (13 wins and 4 draws), Celtic fell short by two points as they ended runners-up to Rangers, who won the league for the fifth year in a row.

However, their Scottish Cup campaign was much more successful, as they beat East Fife, Dundee United and Morton away in the first three rounds, Aberdeen 4-0 home in the fourth round, and Kilmarnock 3-0 in the semi-final at Hampden Park to reach the final against Motherwell, who reached their first ever cup final.

The final played out in dramatic fashion as Motherwell outplayed Celtic and led comfortably 0-2 with eight minutes to go, but one goal by Jimmy McGrory and then an own goal in the dying moments as Motherwell centre half Allan Craig headed the ball towards his keeper only for it to find the net. The replay was scheduled four days later, and Celtic won 4-2 with Bertie Thomson and Jimmy McGrory scoring a brace each.

This was Celtic's 13th Scottish Cup triumph and their 30th major domestic trophy overall.

== Competitions ==
=== Scottish First Division ===
==== League table ====
Pos	Team	Pld	W	D	L	GF	GA	GD	Pts
1	Rangers	38	27	6	5	96	29	+67	60
2	Celtic	38	24	10	4	101	34	+67	58
3	Motherwell	38	24	8	6	102	42	+60	56
4	Partick Thistle	38	24	5	9	76	43	+33	53
5	Heart of Midlothian	38	19	6	13	90	63	+27	44

Source: "1930-1931 Division 1 - SPFL Archive". SPFL.

==== Matches ====
9 August 1930 First Division	Celtic	3–1	Kilmarnock	Glasgow
				Stadium: Celtic Park; Attendance: 20,000

16 August 1930 First Division	Falkirk	3–2	Celtic	Falkirk
				Stadium: Brockville Park; Attendance: 13,000

23 August 1930 First Division	Celtic	6–0	Hibernian	Glasgow
				Stadium: Celtic Park; Attendance: 20,000

30 August 1930 First Division	East Fife	2–6	Celtic	Methil
				Stadium: Bayview Park; Attendance: 8,000

6 September 1930 First Division	Celtic	1–0	Aberdeen	Glasgow
				Stadium: Celtic Park; Attendance: 18,000

13 September 1930 First Division	Hamilton Academical	0–0	Celtic	Hamilton
				Stadium: Douglas Park; Attendance: 10,000

20 September 1930 First Division	Celtic	2–0	Rangers	Glasgow
				Stadium: Celtic Park; Attendance: 83,500

27 September 1930 First Division	Queen's Park	3–3	Celtic	Glasgow
				Stadium: Hampden Park; Attendance: 20,000

4 October 1930 First Division	Celtic	4–1	Morton	Glasgow
				Stadium: Celtic Park; Attendance: 15,000

18 October 1930 First Division	Celtic	3–1	St Mirren	Glasgow
				Stadium: Celtic Park; Attendance: 18,000

25 October 1930 First Division	Motherwell	3–3	Celtic	Motherwell
				Stadium: Fir Park; Attendance: 30,000

1 November 1930 First Division	Celtic	5–1	Partick Thistle	Glasgow
				Stadium: Celtic Park; Attendance: 20,000

8 November 1930 First Division	Celtic	2–1	Hearts	Glasgow
				Stadium: Celtic Park; Attendance: 12,000

15 November 1930 First Division	Cowdenbeath	1–1	Celtic	Cowdenbeath
				Stadium: Central Park; Attendance: 6,000

22 November 1930 First Division	Ayr United	2–6	Celtic	Ayr
				Stadium: Somerset Park; Attendance: 5,000

6 December 1930 First Division	Airdrieonians	1–2	Celtic	Airdrie
				Stadium: Broomfield Park; Attendance: 8,000

13 December 1930 First Division	Celtic	4–0	Leith Athletic	Glasgow
				Stadium: Celtic Park; Attendance: 4,000

20 December 1930 First Division	Kilmarnock	0–3	Celtic	Kilmarnock
				Stadium: Rugby Park; Attendance: 16,000

27 December 1930 First Division	Celtic	3–0	Falkirk	Glasgow
				Stadium: Celtic Park; Attendance: 7,000

1 January 1931 First Division	Rangers	1–0	Celtic	Glasgow
				Stadium: Ibrox Park; Attendance: 83,500

3 January 1931 First Division	Hibernian	0–0	Celtic	Edinburgh
				Stadium: Easter Road; Attendance: 6,000

10 January 1931 First Division	Celtic	9–1	East Fife	Glasgow
				Stadium: Celtic Park; Attendance: 6,000

24 January 1931 First Division	Aberdeen	1–1	Celtic	Aberdeen
				Stadium: Pittodrie Park; Attendance: 20,000

7 February 1931 First Division	Morton	0–1	Celtic	Greenock
				Stadium: Cappielow Park; Attendance: 12,000

18 February 1931 First Division	Celtic	0–1	Clyde	Glasgow
				Stadium: Celtic Park; Attendance: 15,000

21 February 1931 First Division	St Mirren	1–3	Celtic	Paisley
				Stadium: St Mirren Park, Love Street; Attendance: 15,000

24 February 1931 First Division	Celtic	2–1	Hamilton Academical	Glasgow
				Stadium: Celtic Park; Attendance: 10,000

4 March 1931 First Division	Celtic	4–1	Motherwell	Glasgow
				Stadium: Celtic Park; Attendance: 32,000

7 March 1931 First Division	Partick Thistle	1–0	Celtic	Glasgow
				Stadium: Firhill Park; Attendance: 15,000

18 March 1931 First Division	Hearts	1–1	Celtic	Edinburgh
				Stadium: Tynecastle Park; Attendance: 28,000

21 March 1931 First Division	Celtic	6–0	Cowdenbeath	Glasgow
				Stadium: Celtic Park; Attendance: 10,000

25 March 1931 First Division	Celtic	2–2	Dundee	Glasgow
				Stadium: Celtic Park; Attendance: 12,000

4 April 1931 First Division	Celtic	4–1	Ayr United	Glasgow
				Stadium: Celtic Park; Attendance: 8,000

6 April 1931 First Division	Clyde	0–2	Celtic	Glasgow
				Stadium: Shawfield Stadium; Attendance: 20,000

18 April 1931 First Division	Celtic	3–1	Airdrieonians	Glasgow
				Stadium: Celtic Park; Attendance: 15,000

22 April 1931 First Division	Dundee	0–0	Celtic	Dundee
				Stadium: Dens Park; Attendance: 12,000

25 April 1931 First Division	Leith Athletic	0–3	Celtic	Edinburgh
				Stadium: Marine Gardens; Attendance: 9,000

28 April 1931 First Division	Celtic	1–1	Queen's Park	Glasgow
				Stadium: Celtic Park; Attendance: 5,000

=== Scottish Cup ===
17 January 1931 First round	East Fife	1–2	Celtic	Methil
				Stadium: Bayview Park; Attendance: 9,000

4 February 1931 Second round	Dundee United	2–3	Celtic	Dundee
				Stadium: Tannadice Park; Attendance: 13,000

14 February 1931 Third round	Morton	1–4	Celtic	Greenock
				Stadium: Cappielow Park; Attendance: 20,577

28 February 1931 Fourth round	Celtic	4–0	Aberdeen	Glasgow
				Stadium: Celtic Park; Attendance: 64,699

14 March 1931 Semi-final	Celtic	3–0	Kilmarnock	Glasgow
				Stadium: Hampden Park; Attendance: 53,973

11 April 1931 Final	Celtic	2–2	Motherwell	Glasgow
				Stadium: Hampden Park; Attendance: 104,683

15 April 1931 Final Replay	Celtic	4–2	Motherwell	Glasgow
				Stadium: Hampden Park; Attendance: 98,509
