= 1932–33 Celtic F.C. season =

Celtic
1932–33 season
- Manager: Willie Maley
- Stadium: Celtic Park
- Scottish First Division: 4th
- Scottish Cup: Winners

The 1932–33 Scottish football season was Celtic's 45th season of competitive football, in which they competed in the Scottish First Division and the Scottish Cup.

Celtic ended the league in fourth position below Hearts, Motherwell and champions Rangers, thus failing to win the league for the seventh season in a row, which was their longest dry spell ever at the time.

However, Celtic managed to win the Scottish Cup for the 14th time in their history, their 31st major domestic honour. After defeating Dunfermline Athletic 1-7 away in the first round and both Falkirk and Partick Thistle at home, they needed replays to advance against both Albion Rovers in the fourth round and Hearts in the semi-final.

Facing Motherwell in the final, the same rival they had faced in the 1931 final, they beat them 1-0 at Hampden Park with a Jimmy McGrory goal, in front of over 100,000 spectators.

== Competitions ==
=== Scottish First Division ===
==== League table ====
Pos	Team	Pld	W	D	L	GF	GA	GD	Pts
2	Motherwell	38	27	5	6	114	53	+61	59
3	Heart of Midlothian	38	21	8	9	84	51	+33	50
4	Celtic	38	20	8	10	75	44	+31	48
5	St Johnstone	38	17	10	11	70	55	+15	44
6	Aberdeen	38	18	6	14	85	58	+27	42

Source: RSSSF

==== Matches ====
13 August 1932 First Division	Celtic	3–0	Aberdeen	Glasgow
				Stadium: Celtic Park; Attendance: 15,000

16 August 1932 First Division	Celtic	4–2	Third Lanark	Glasgow
				Stadium: Celtic Park; Attendance: 12,000

20 August 1932 First Division	Hamilton Academical	1–1	Celtic	Hamilton
				Stadium: Douglas Park; Attendance: 10,000

24 August 1932 First Division	Celtic	1–2	Partick Thistle	Glasgow
				Stadium: Celtic Park; Attendance: 20,000

27 August 1932 First Division	Celtic	7–1	Morton	Glasgow
				Stadium: Celtic Park; Attendance: 8,000

30 August 1932 First Division	Celtic	4–1	Ayr United	Glasgow
				Stadium: Celtic Park; Attendance: 4,000

3 September 1932 First Division	Falkirk	1–1	Celtic	Falkirk
				Stadium: Brockville Park; Attendance: 12,000

10 September 1932 First Division	Celtic	1–1	Rangers	Glasgow
				Stadium: Celtic Park

14 September 1932 First Division	East Stirlingshire	1–3	Celtic	Falkirk
				Stadium: Firs Park; Attendance: 5,000

17 September 1932 First Division	Queen's Park	4–1	Celtic	Glasgow
				Stadium: Hampden Park; Attendance: 10,000

24 September 1932 First Division	Celtic	0–0	Kilmarnock	Glasgow
				Stadium: Celtic Park; Attendance: 6,000

1 October 1932 First Division	Hearts	1–1	Celtic	Edinburgh
				Stadium: Tynecastle Park; Attendance: 32,441

8 October 1932 First Division	Celtic	5–0	St Johnstone	Glasgow
				Stadium: Celtic Park; Attendance: 4,000

15 October 1932 First Division	Clyde	0–2	Celtic	Glasgow
				Stadium: Shawfield Stadium; Attendance: 8,000

22 October 1932 First Division	Celtic	4–1	Motherwell	Glasgow
				Stadium: Celtic Park; Attendance: 15,000

29 October 1932 First Division	St Mirren	3–1	Celtic	Paisley
				Stadium: St Mirren Park, Love Street; Attendance: 7,000

5 November 1932 First Division	Partick Thistle	3–0	Celtic	Glasgow
				Stadium: Firhill Park; Attendance: 20,000

12 November 1932 First Division	Celtic	3–0	East Stirlingshire	Glasgow
				Stadium: Celtic Park; Attendance: 5,000

19 November 1932 First Division	Celtic	3–0	Cowdenbeath	Glasgow
				Stadium: Celtic Park; Attendance: 6,000

26 November 1932 First Division	Third Lanark	0–4	Celtic	Glasgow
				Stadium: Cathkin Park; Attendance: 12,000

3 December 1932 First Division	Airdrieonians	0–3	Celtic	Airdrie
				Stadium: Broomfield Park; Attendance: 5,000

10 December 1932 First Division	Celtic	3–2	Dundee	Glasgow
				Stadium: Celtic Park; Attendance: 6,500

17 December 1932 First Division	Ayr United	0–1	Celtic	Ayr
				Stadium: Somerset Park; Attendance: 8,000

24 December 1932 First Division	Aberdeen	1–0	Celtic	Aberdeen
				Stadium: Pittodrie Park; Attendance: 23,000

26 December 1932 First Division	Celtic	2–0	Queen's Park	Glasgow
				Stadium: Celtic Park; Attendance: 15,000

31 December 1932 First Division	Celtic	0–3	Hamilton Academical	Glasgow
				Stadium: Celtic Park; Attendance: 4,000

2 January 1933 First Division	Rangers	0–0	Celtic	Glasgow
				Stadium: Ibrox Park; Attendance: 42,000

7 January 1933 First Division	Morton	0–1	Celtic	Greenock
				Stadium: Cappielow Park; Attendance: 5,000

14 January 1933 First Division	Celtic	0–1	Falkirk	Glasgow
				Stadium: Celtic Park; Attendance: 7,000

28 January 1933 First Division	Kilmarnock	2–2	Celtic	Kilmarnock
				Stadium: Rugby Park; Attendance: 12,000

11 February 1933 First Division	Celtic	3–2	Hearts	Glasgow
				Stadium: Celtic Park; Attendance: 15,000

25 February 1933 First Division	St Johnstone	1–0	Celtic	Perth
				Stadium: Muirton Park; Attendance: 8,500

11 March 1933 First Division	Motherwell	4–2	Celtic	Motherwell
				Stadium: Fir Park; Attendance: 17,000

25 March 1933 First Division	Cowdenbeath	1–5	Celtic	Cowdenbeath
				Stadium: Central Park; Attendance: 5,000

3 April 1933 First Division	Celtic	0–0	St Mirren	Glasgow
				Stadium: Celtic Park; Attendance: 7,000

10 April 1933 First Division	Celtic	2–1	Clyde	Glasgow
				Stadium: Celtic Park; Attendance: 8,000

18 April 1933 First Division	Celtic	2–1	Airdrieonians	Glasgow
				Stadium: Celtic Park; Attendance: 2,000

22 April 1933 First Division	Dundee	3–0	Celtic	Dundee
				Stadium: Dens Park; Attendance: 8,000

=== Scottish Cup ===
21 January 1933 First round	Dunfermline Athletic	1–7	Celtic	Dunfermline
				Stadium: East End Park; Attendance: 8,394

4 February 1933 Second round	Celtic	2–0	Falkirk	Glasgow
				Stadium: Celtic Park; Attendance: 26,744

18 February 1933 Third round	Celtic	2–1	Partick Thistle	Glasgow
				Stadium: Celtic Park; Attendance: 55,595

4 March 1933 Fourth round	Albion Rovers	1–1	Celtic	Coatbridge
				Stadium: Cliftonhill; Attendance: 14,000

8 March 1933 Fourth round replay	Celtic	3–1	Albion Rovers	Glasgow
				Stadium: Celtic Park; Attendance: 23,810

18 March 1933 Semi-final	Celtic	0–0	Hearts	Glasgow
				Stadium: Hampden Park; Attendance: 87,219

22 March 1933 Semi-final Replay	Celtic	2–1	Hearts	Glasgow
				Stadium: Hampden Park; Attendance: 63,756

15 April 1933 Final	Celtic	1–0	Motherwell	Glasgow
				Stadium: Hampden Park; Attendance: 102,339
