= 1911–12 Celtic F.C. season =

Celtic
1911–12 season
- Manager: Willie Maley
- Stadium: Celtic Park
- Scottish First Division: 2nd
- Scottish Cup: Winners

The 1911–12 Scottish football season was Celtic's 24th season of competitive football, in which they competed in the Scottish First Division. They finished the league campaign runners-up to Rangers. Celtic successfully defended their Scottish Cup trophy as they beat Clyde FC in the final, 2-0. It was Celtic's 18th major domestic honour.

This was the first season as captain for right half Jim Young, as half back Jimmy Hay left the club to play for Newcastle United. Young had been with Celtic since 1903 and was the sixth player to captain the club.

Celtic also won the Glasgow Merchants' Charity Cup this season.

== Competitions ==
=== Scottish First Division ===
==== League table ====
Pos	Team	Pld	W	D	L	GF	GA	GD	Pts
1	Rangers (C)	34	24	3	7	86	34	+52	51
2	Celtic	34	17	11	6	58	33	+25	45
3	Clyde	34	19	4	11	56	32	+24	42
4	Heart of Midlothian	34	16	8	10	54	40	+14	40
5	Partick Thistle	34	16	8	10	47	40	+7	40

Source: "1911-1912 Division 1 - SPFL Archive". SPFL.
(C) Champions

==== Matches ====
15 August 1911 First Division	Celtic	3–0	Airdrieonains	Glasgow
				Stadium: Celtic Park; Attendance: 20,000

19 August 1911 First Division	Celtic	3–1	Falkirk	Glasgow
				Stadium: Celtic Park; Attendance: 16,000

26 August 1911 First Division	Morton	1–1	Celtic	Greenock
				Stadium: Cappielow Park; Attendance: 8,000

2 September 1911 First Division	Celtic	3–2	Clyde	Glasgow
				Stadium: Celtic Park; Attendance: 16,000

16 September 1911 First Division	Dundee	3–1	Celtic	Dundee
				Stadium: Dens Park; Attendance: 15,000

23 September 1911 First Division	Kilmarnock	0–2	Celtic	Kilmarnock
				Stadium: Rugby Park; Attendance: 6,000

25 September 1911 First Division	Celtic	3–0	Partick Thistle	Glasgow
				Stadium: Celtic Park; Attendance: 8,000

30 September 1911 First Division	Hearts	2–1	Celtic	Edinburgh
				Stadium: Tynecastle Park; Attendance: 23,000

2 October 1911 First Division	Raith Rovers	1–2	Celtic	Kirkcaldy
				Stadium: Stark's Park; Attendance: 4,000

7 October 1911 First Division	Hamilton Academical	1–0	Celtic	Hamilton
				Stadium: Douglas Park; Attendance: 7,000

14 October 1911 First Division	Celtic	1–0	Aberdeen	Glasgow
				Stadium: Celtic Park; Attendance: 10,000

21 October 1911 First Division	Rangers	3–1	Celtic	Glasgow
				Stadium: Ibrox Park; Attendance: 47,000

28 October 1911 First Division	Celtic	3–1	Hibernian	Glasgow
				Stadium: Celtic Park; Attendance: 7,000

4 November 1911 First Division	Falkirk	1–1	Celtic	Falkirk
				Stadium: Brockville Park; Attendance: 7,000

11 November 1911 First Division	Celtic	2–1	Hamilton Academical	Glasgow
				Stadium: Celtic Park; Attendance: 8,000

18 November 1911 First Division	Hibernian	1–1	Celtic	Edinburgh
				Stadium: Easter Road; Attendance: 11,000

25 November 1911 First Division	Motherwell	3–2	Celtic	Motherwell
				Stadium: Fir Park; Attendance: 8,000

2 December 1911 First Division	Celtic	3–1	St Mirren	Glasgow
				Stadium: Celtic Park; Attendance: 12,000

9 December 1911 First Division	Queen's Park	1–4	Celtic	Glasgow
				Stadium: Hampden Park; Attendance: 15,000

16 December 1911 First Division	Third Lanark	1–0	Celtic	Glasgow
				Stadium: Cathkin Park; Attendance: 12,000

23 December 1911 First Division	Celtic	1–1	Morton	Glasgow
				Stadium: Celtic Park; Attendance: 4,000

30 December 1911 First Division	Airdrieonians	0–0	Celtic	Airdrie
				Stadium: Broomfield Park; Attendance: 6,000

1 January 1912 First Division	Celtic	3–0	Rangers	Glasgow
				Stadium: Celtic Park; Attendance: 70,000

2 January 1912 First Division	Clyde	1–1	Celtic	Glasgow
			Shawfield Stadium	Attendance: 17,000

6 January 1912 First Division	Celtic	1–1	Hearts	Glasgow
				Stadium: Celtic Park; Attendance: 20,000

13 January 1912 First Division	Celtic	2–0	Motherwell	Glasgow
				Stadium: Celtic Park; Attendance: 17,000

20 January 1912 First Division	St Mirren	1–1	Celtic	Paisley
				Stadium: St Mirren Park, Love Street; Attendance: 12,000

3 February 1912 First Division	Celtic	3–1	Third Lanark	Glasgow
				Stadium: Celtic Park; Attendance: 11,000

17 February 1912 First Division	Celtic	2–1	Queen's Park	Glasgow
				Stadium: Celtic Park; Attendance: 12,000

2 March 1912 First Division	Celtic	2–0	Dundee	Glasgow
				Stadium: Celtic Park; Attendance: 6,000

16 March 1912 First Division	Partick Thistle	1–1	Celtic	Glasgow
				Stadium: Firhill Park; Attendance: 23,000

23 March 1912 First Division	Aberdeen	1–1	Celtic	Aberdeen
				Stadium: Pittodrie Park; Attendance: 6,000

13 April 1912 First Division	Celtic	2–0	Kilmarnock	Glasgow
				Stadium: Celtic Park; Attendance: 2,500

20 April 1912 First Division	Celtic	1–1	Raith Rovers	Glasgow
				Stadium: Celtic Park; Attendance: 2,000

=== Scottish Cup ===
27 January 1912 First round	Celtic	1–0	Dunfermline Athletic	Glasgow
				Stadium: Celtic Park; Attendance: 9,000

10 February 1912 Second round	Celtic	3–0	East Stirlingshire	Glasgow
				Stadium: Celtic Park; Attendance: 6,000

24 February 1912 Third round	Aberdeen	2–2	Celtic	Aberdeen
				Stadium: Pittodrie Park; Attendance: 22,000

9 March 1912 Third round replay	Celtic	2–0	Aberdeen	Glasgow
				Stadium: Celtic Park; Attendance: 31,000

30 March 1912 Semi-final	Hearts	0–3	Celtic	Glasgow
				Stadium: Ibrox Park; Attendance: 43,000

6 April 1912 Final	Celtic	2–0	Clyde	Glasgow
				Stadium: Ibrox Park; Attendance: 46,000
