= 1901–02 Scottish Cup =

Tournament details
- Country: Scotland

Final positions
- Champions: Hibernian
- Runners-up: Celtic

The 1901–02 Scottish Cup was the 29th season of Scotland's most prestigious football knockout competition. The Cup was won by Hibernian, who defeated Celtic 1–0 in the Final. This gave Hibs their second Scottish Cup, a tally they would not add to until 2016. The Final was due to be played at Ibrox on 12 April, but the first Ibrox disaster happened a week earlier during the annual Scotland v England fixture. This meant that the Final was delayed by two weeks and moved to Celtic Park, even though Celtic were one of the finalists.

== Calendar ==
Round	First match date	Fixtures	Clubs
First Round	11 January 1902	16	32 → 16
Second Round	25 January 1902	8	16 → 8
Quarter-finals	February (various)	4	8 → 4
Semi-finals	22 March 1902	2	4 → 2
Final	26 April 1902	1	2 → 1

== First round ==
Home team	Score	Away team
Arbroath	3 – 2	Kilwinning Eglinton
Arthurlie	1 – 1	Port Glasgow Athletic
Ayr	0 – 0	Dundee
Celtic	3 – 0	Thornliebank
Falkirk	2 – 0	Lochgelly United
Forfar Athletic	3 – 2	Abercorn
Heart of Midlothian	0 – 0	Cowdenbeath
Hibernian	2 – 0	Clyde
Inverness Caledonian	6 – 1	Stranraer
Kilmarnock	4 – 0	Partick Thistle
Queen's Park	7 – 0	Maxwelltown Volunteers
Rangers	6 – 1	Johnstone
St Bernard's	1 – 0	Motherwell
St Mirren	1 – 0	Airdrieonians
Stenhousemuir	6 – 1	Stanley
3rd Lanark RV	0 – 0	Morton

=== Replays ===
Home team	Score	Away team
Cowdenbeath	0 – 3	Heart of Midlothian
Dundee	2 – 0	Ayr
Morton	2 – 3	3rd Lanark RV
Port Glasgow Athletic	3 – 1	Arthurlie

== Second round ==
Home team	Score	Away team
Arbroath	2 – 3	Celtic
Falkirk	2 – 0	St Bernard's
Forfar Athletic	1 – 4	Queen's Park
Heart of Midlothian	4 – 1	3rd Lanark RV
Kilmarnock	2 – 0	Dundee
Port Glasgow Athletic	1 – 5	Hibernian
Rangers	5 – 1	Inverness Caledonian
St Mirren	6 – 0	Stenhousemuir

== Quarter-finals ==
Home team	Score	Away team
Falkirk	0 – 2	St Mirren
Heart of Midlothian	1 – 1	Celtic
Queen's Park	1 – 7	Hibernian
Rangers	2 – 0	Kilmarnock

=== Replays ===
Home team	Score	Away team
Celtic	2 – 1	Heart of Midlothian

== Semi-finals ==
22 March 1902

Rangers	0–2	Hibernian

Attendance: 35,000

22 March 1902

St Mirren	2–3	Celtic

Attendance: 12,000

== Final ==
26 April 1902

Hibernian	1–0	Celtic
McGeachan 75'

Celtic Park, Glasgow
Attendance: 16,000

== See also ==
- 1901–02 in Scottish football
