= Johnny Crum =

Scottish footballer

Personal information
- Full name: John Crum
- Date of birth: 1 January 1912
- Place of birth: Glasgow, Scotland
- Date of death: 6 July 1969 (aged 57)
- Position: Forward

Youth career
- Ashfield
- Maryhill Hibs

Senior career*
Years	Team	Apps	(Gls)
1932–1942	Celtic	189	(74)
1942–1946	Morton		

International career
1936–1938	Scotland	2	(0)
1939	Scottish League XI	1	(0)
- * Club domestic league appearances and goals

Johnny Crum (1 January 1912 in Glasgow – 6 July 1969) was a Scottish footballer, who played for Celtic, Greenock Morton and Scotland.
