= 1875–76 Heart of Midlothian F.C. season =

Heart of Midlothian
1875–76 season
- Scottish Cup: Second Round

Season 1875–76 was the first season in which Heart of Midlothian competed at a Scottish national level, entering the Scottish Cup for the first time.

== Overview ==
Hearts entered the Scottish Cup for the first time reaching the second round.

Hearts received a boost by qualifying for the second round despite two no scoring draws against 3rd Edinburgh RV in the first round, as the laws of the competition at the time meant both teams qualified for the next ties. Hearts were knocked out 2–0 in the second round against Drumpellier.

== Results ==
=== Friendlies ===
28 August 1875 Friendly	Hearts	0–2	3rd Edinburgh RV
			Goal

6 November 1875 Friendly	Hearts	3–0	Hanover
	Goal

25 December 1875 Friendly	Hearts	1–0	Hibs
	Goal

8 January 1876 Friendly	3rd Edinburgh RV	1–0	Hearts
	Goal

19 February 1876 Friendly	Dunfermline	1–1	Hearts
	Goal		Goal

11 March 1876 Friendly	Hearts	1–2	Dunfermline
	Goal		Goal

25 March 1876 Friendly	Hearts	2–0	Edinburgh Swifts
	Goal

29 April 1876 Friendly	Hearts	1–0	Edinburgh Swifts
	Goal

6 May 1876 Friendly	Hearts	2–1	St Andrew's
	Goal		Goal

=== Scottish Cup ===
16 October 1875 Scottish Cup R1	Hearts	0–0	3rd Edinburgh RV

23 October 1875 Scottish Cup R1 Replay	3rd Edinburgh RV	0–0	Hearts

13 November 1875 Scottish Cup R2	Drumpellier	2–0	Hearts
	Goal

=== Edinburgh FA Cup ===
20 November 1875 Edinburgh FA Cup R1	Hearts	0– 1	Edinburgh Thistle

== See also ==
- List of Heart of Midlothian F.C. seasons
