= 1883–84 Heart of Midlothian F.C. season =

Heart of Midlothian
1883–84 season
- Scottish Cup: Round 3

Season 1883–84 was the ninth season in which Heart of Midlothian competed at a Scottish national level, entering the Scottish Cup for the ninth time.

== Overview ==
Hearts reached the third round of the Scottish Cup and were knocked out by Edinburgh rivals Hibs. Later that season they reached the semi-final of the newly renamed East of Scotland Shield once again being knocked out by Hibs.

== Results ==
=== Scottish Cup ===
8 September 1883 Scottish Cup R1	Hearts	8–0	Brunswick	Tynecastle Park

29 September 1883 Scottish Cup R2	Newcastleton	1–4	Hearts	Newcastleton

20 October 1883 Scottish Cup R3	Hearts	1–4	Hibs	Tynecastle Park

=== Edinburgh Shield ===
22 September 1883 East of Scotland Shield R1	Hearts	7–0	Rose	Tynecastle Park

27 October 1883 East of Scotland Shield R2	Hearts	5–2	Leith Thistle	Tynecastle Park

17 November 1883 East of Scotland Shield R3	Kirkcaldy Wanderers	0–3	Hearts	Stark's Park

8 December 1883 East of Scotland Shield R4	Hearts	5–1	Edinburgh University	Tynecastle Park

9 February 1884 East of Scotland Shield SF	Edinburgh University	4–1	Hearts	Hibernian Park

=== Rosebery Charity Cup ===
22 March 1884 Rosebery Charity Cup SF	St Bernard's	4–2	Hearts	Powderhall
				Attendance: 4,000

== See also ==
- List of Heart of Midlothian F.C. seasons
