= 1876–77 Heart of Midlothian F.C. season =

Heart of Midlothian
1876–77 season
- Scottish Cup: Second Round
Home colours

Season 1876–77 was the second season in which Heart of Midlothian competed at a Scottish national level, entering the Scottish Cup for the second time.

== Overview ==
Hearts entered the Scottish Cup for the second time. However they failed to turn up for the match and the game was awarded to Dunfermline.

== Results ==
=== Friendlies ===
| 13 January 1877 Friendly | Hearts | 2–1 | Hanover |

| 27 January 1877 Friendly | 3rd Edinburgh RV | 7–0 | Hearts |

| 16 February 1877 Friendly | Hearts | 1–1 | Hibs |

| 24 February 1877 Friendly | Hearts | 0–1 | Hibs |

| 3 March 1877 Friendly | Dunfermline | 0–0 | Hearts |

| 24 March 1877 Friendly | Hearts | 2–1 | Hanover |

| 31 March 1877 Friendly | Hearts | 1–1 | Edinburgh Thistle |

| 21 April 1877 Friendly | Hearts | 0–1 | Hibs |

=== Scottish Cup ===
| 23 September 1876 Scottish Cup R1 | Dunfermline | W/O | Hearts |

== See also ==
- List of Heart of Midlothian F.C. seasons
