= 1878–79 Heart of Midlothian F.C. season =

Heart of Midlothian
1878–79 season
- Scottish Cup: 4th Round

Season 1878–79 was the fourth season in which Heart of Midlothian competed at a Scottish national level, entering the Scottish Cup for the fourth time.

== Overview ==
Hearts reached the fourth round of the Scottish Cup, losing 2–1 to Helensburgh.

Hearts also reached the final of the Edinburgh FA Cup losing 2–0 to Hibs after a replay.

== Results ==
=== Scottish cup ===
21 September 1878 Scottish Cup R1	Hearts	3– 1	Edinburgh Swifts

19 October 1878 Scottish Cup R2	Hearts	1– 0	Edinburgh Thistle

9 November 1878 Scottish Cup R3	Hearts	2– 1	Arbroath

9 November 1878 Scottish Cup R4	Helensburgh	2– 1	Hearts

=== Edinburgh FA Cup ===
12 October 1878 Edinburgh FA Cup R1	Dunfermline	1– 5	Hearts

2 November 1878 Edinburgh FA Cup SF	Hearts	4– 0	Hanover

1 March 1879 Edinburgh FA Cup Final	Hearts	1– 1	Hibs

29 March 1879 Edinburgh FA Cup Final Replay	Hearts	0– 2	Hibs

== See also ==
- List of Heart of Midlothian F.C. seasons
