= 1886–87 Heart of Midlothian F.C. season =

Heart of Midlothian
1886–87 season
- Scottish Cup: Round 3

Season 1886–87 was the 12nd season in which Heart of Midlothian competed at a Scottish national level, entering the Scottish Cup for the eleventh time.

== Overview ==
Hearts reached the third round of the Scottish Cup and were knocked out by Edinburgh rivals Hibs. They also competed in the FA Cup being knocked out by Darwen in the first round.

Later that season they reached the final of the East of Scotland Shield losing for the second time in the season to Hibs.

== Results ==
=== Scottish Cup ===
11 September 1886 Scottish Cup R1	Edina	1–7	Hearts	Edinburgh

2 October 1886 Scottish Cup R2	Broxburn Thistle	1–2	Hearts	Albyn Park

23 October 1886 Scottish Cup R3	Hibs	5–1	Hearts	Hibernian Park

=== FA Cup ===
30 October 1886 FA Cup R1	Darwen	7–1	Hearts	Barley Bank

=== East of Scotland Shield ===
25 September 1886 East of Scotland Shield R1	Hearts	6–0	Glencairn	Tynecastle Park

6 November 1886 East of Scotland Shield R2	Hearts	2–1	Royal Oak	Tynecastle Park

20 November 1886 East of Scotland Shield R3	Dunfermline	2–5	Hearts	East End Park

25 December 1886 East of Scotland Shield R4	Hearts	0–0	Leith Thistle	Tynecastle Park

8 January 1887 East of Scotland Shield R4 Replay	Leith Thistle	0–7	Hearts	Glencairn FC Ground

22 January 1887 East of Scotland Shield SF	Broxburn Shamrock	1–3	Hearts	Easter Road, Broxburn

12 March 1887 East of Scotland Shield Final	Hibs	3–0	Hearts	Powderhall

=== Rosebery Charity Cup ===
9 April 1887 Rosebery Charity Cup SF	Edinburgh University	0–1	Hearts	Powderhall

16 May 1887 Rosebery Charity Cup Final	Hibs	7–1	Hearts	Hibernian Park

== See also ==
- List of Heart of Midlothian F.C. seasons
