= 1879–80 Heart of Midlothian F.C. season =

Heart of Midlothian
1879–80 season
- Scottish Cup: 3rd round

Season 1879–80 was the fifth season in which Heart of Midlothian competed at a Scottish national level, entering the Scottish Cup for the fifth time.

== Overview ==
Hearts reached the third round of the Scottish Cup losing to Edinburgh derby rivals Hibs in the third rounds, in a match played at Mayfield Park, in the Mayfield area of Edinburgh. It was the third attempt at staging the match.

== Results ==
=== Scottish Cup ===
22 September 1879 Scottish Cup R1	Hearts	Walk	Third Edinburgh RV	Powderhall

18 October 1879 Scottish Cup R2	Hearts	4–2	Brunswick	Powderhall

- Game had to be replayed due to power failure.

20 October 1879 Scottish Cup R2 Replay	Hearts	2–1	Brunswick	Powderhall

15 November 1879 Scottish Cup R3	Hibs	2–1	Hearts	Mayfield Park

=== Edinburgh FA Cup ===
4 October 1879 Edinburgh FA Cup R1	Hearts	13–1	Lancefield	Powderhall

22 November 1879 Edinburgh FA Cup R2	Bathgate	1–3	Hearts	Bathgate

20 December 1879 Edinburgh FA Cup R3	Hearts	4–2	Edinburgh University	Powderhall

31 January 1880 Edinburgh FA Cup SF	Hearts	2–5	Hibs	Powderhall

== See also ==
- List of Heart of Midlothian F.C. seasons
