= 1887–88 Heart of Midlothian F.C. season =

Heart of Midlothian
1887–88 season
- Scottish Cup: Round 4

Season 1887–88 was the twelfth season in which Heart of Midlothian competed at a Scottish national level, entering the Scottish Cup for the twelfth time.

== Overview ==
Hearts reached the fourth round of the Scottish Cup losing to St Mirren after 3 replays.

Later that season they reached the Semi Final of the East of Scotland Shield losing to Hibs.

== Results ==
=== Scottish Cup ===
3 September 1887 Scottish Cup R1	Hearts	4–1	Norton Park	Tynecastle Park

15 October 1887 Scottish Cup R3	Hearts	1–1	Hibs	Tynecastle Park

22 October 1887 Scottish Cup R3 Replay	Hibs	1–3	Hearts	Hibernian Park

5 November 1887 Scottish Cup R4	Hearts	1–1	St Mirren	Tynecastle Park

12 November 1887 Scottish Cup R4 Replay	St Mirren	2–2	Hearts	Westmarch

29 November 1887 Scottish Cup R4 Second Replay	Hearts	2–2	St Mirren	Merchiston Park

26 November 1887 Scottish Cup R4 Third Replay	St Mirren	4–2	Hearts	Cathkin Park

=== East of Scotland Shield ===
17 September 1887 East of Scotland Shield R1	Hearts	18–0	Vale of Midlothian	Tynecastle Park

29 October 1887 East of Scotland Shield R3	Hearts	5–2	St Bernard's	Tynecastle Park

10 December 1887 East of Scotland Shield R4	Hearts	6–1	Bo'ness	Tynecastle Park

24 December 1887 East of Scotland Shield SF	Hibs	5–2	Hearts	Hibernian Park

=== Rosebery Charity Cup ===
14 April 1888 Rosebery Charity Cup SF	Hearts	0–6	Hibs	Powderhall

== See also ==
- List of Heart of Midlothian F.C. seasons
