= 1888–89 Heart of Midlothian F.C. season =

Heart of Midlothian
1888–89 season
- Stadium: Tynecastle Park
- Scottish Cup: 4th Round
- East of Scotland Shield: Winners

Season 1888–89 was the thirteenth season in which Heart of Midlothian competed at a Scottish national level, entering the Scottish Cup for the thirteenth time.

== Overview ==
Hearts reached the fourth round of the Scottish Cup losing to Campsie.

Hearts Won the East of Scotland Shield beating Leith Athletic in the final.

== Results ==
=== Scottish Cup ===
1 September 1888 Scottish Cup R1	Boness	0–1	Hearts	Newtown Park

22 September 1888 Scottish Cup R2	Hearts	4–0	Erin Rovers Bathgate	Tynecastle Park

13 October 1888 Scottish Cup R3	Broxburn Star	2–2	Hearts	Broxburn

20 October 1888 Scottish Cup R3 Replay	Hearts	2–0	Broxburn Star	Tynecastle Park

3 November 1888 Scottish Cup R4	Campsie	3–1	Hearts	Lennox Park

=== East of Scotland Shield ===
27 September 1888 East of Scotland Shield R1	St Bernard's	1–1	Hearts	Powderhall

6 October 1888 East of Scotland Shield R1 Replay	Hearts	2–1	St Bernard's	Tynecastle Park

27 October 1888 East of Scotland Shield R2	Hearts	4–0	Norton Park	Tynecastle Park

17 November 1888 East of Scotland Shield R4	Hearts	1–1	Mossend Swifts	Tynecastle Park

8 December 1888 East of Scotland Shield R4 Replay	Mossend Swifts	0–4	Hearts	Mossend Park

19 January 1889 East of Scotland Shield SF	Polton Vale	0–11	Hearts	Loanhead

2 March 1889 East of Scotland Shield Final	Hearts	5–2	Leith Athletic	Hibernian Park

=== Rosebery Charity Cup ===
23 March 1889 Rosebery Charity Cup SF	Mossend Swifts	2–0	Hearts	Mossend Park

== See also ==
- List of Heart of Midlothian F.C. seasons
