= 1877–78 Heart of Midlothian F.C. season =

Heart of Midlothian
1877–78 season
- Scottish Cup: First Round

Season 1877–78 was the third season in which Heart of Midlothian competed at a Scottish national level, entering the Scottish Cup for the third time.

== Overview ==
Hearts only reached the first round of the Scottish Cup, being defeated by Edinburgh derby rivals Hibs in the first round after a replay.

Later that season, Hibs and Hearts contested the Final of the Edinburgh FA Cup. Hearts eventually won the local competition after a fourth replay, with the decisive match (won 3–2 by Hearts) played over two months after the first attempt. The long running saga established Hibs and Hearts as the predominant clubs in Edinburgh. The Edinburgh derby, as it would become known, is the second oldest regularly played derby match, after the Nottingham derby between Notts County and Nottingham Forest.

== Results ==
=== Scottish cup ===
29 September 1877 Scottish Cup R1	Hearts	0–0	Hibs

6 October 1877 Scottish Cup R1 Replay	Hibs	2–1	Hearts

=== Edinburgh FA Cup ===
17 November 1877 Edinburgh FA Cup R1	Brunswick	1–3	Hearts

22 December 1877 Edinburgh FA Cup SF	Dunfermline	1–2	Hearts

9 February 1878 Edinburgh FA Cup Final	Hibs	0–0	Hearts

16 February 1878 Edinburgh FA Cup Final	Hibs	1–1	Hearts

23 February 1878 Edinburgh FA Cup Final	Hibs	1–1	Hearts

6 April 1878 Edinburgh FA Cup Final	Hibs	1–1	Hearts

20 April 1878 Edinburgh FA Cup Final	Hibs	2–3	Hearts

== See also ==
- List of Heart of Midlothian F.C. seasons
