= 1880–81 Heart of Midlothian F.C. season =

Heart of Midlothian
1880–81 season
- Scottish Cup: 5th Round

Season 1880–81 was the sixth season in which Heart of Midlothian competed at a Scottish national level, entering the Scottish Cup for the sixth time.

== Overview ==
Hearts reached the fifth round of the Scottish Cup losing to Arthurlie.

Hearts reached the third round of the Edinburgh FA Cup losing to city rival Hibs. On the way Hearts recorded their biggest known victory against Anchor winning 21–0.

== Results ==
=== Scottish Cup ===
11 September 1880 Scottish Cup R1	Hearts	3–1	Brunswick	Powderhall

23 October 1880 Scottish Cup R3	Hearts	5–3	Hibs	Powderhall

13 November 1880 Scottish Cup R4	Hearts	3–0	Cambuslang	Powderhall

11 December 1880 Scottish Cup R5	Arthurlie	4– 0	Hearts	Arthurlie Cross

=== Edinburgh FA Cup ===
25 September 1880 Edinburgh FA Cup R1	West Calder	1–8	Hearts	West Calder

30 October 1880 Edinburgh FA Cup R2	Hearts	21–0	Anchor	Powderhall

4 December 1880 Edinburgh FA Cup R3	Hearts	1–3	Hibs	Powderhall

== See also ==
- List of Heart of Midlothian F.C. seasons
