= 1884–85 Heart of Midlothian F.C. season =

Heart of Midlothian
1884–85 season
- Scottish Cup: Disqualified

Season 1884–85 was the tenth season in which Heart of Midlothian competed at a Scottish national level, entering the Scottish Cup for the tenth time.

== Overview ==
Hearts entered the Scottish Cup at the second round winning their match against Dunfermline. Hearts should have proceeded to the third round but were disqualified for professionalism.

Later that season Hearts reached the fourth round of the Edinburgh Shield losing to Rival Hibernian.

== Results ==
=== Scottish Cup ===
4 October 1884 Scottish Cup R1	Dunfermline	1–11	Hearts	Dunfermline

=== Edinburgh Shield ===
28 September 1884 Edinburgh Shield R1	Hearts	9–0	Royal Oak	Tynecastle Park

18 October 1884 Edinburgh Shield R2	Hearts	5–0	Easter	Tynecastle Park

29 November 1884 Edinburgh Shield R3	Hearts	4–2	St Bernard's	Tynecastle Park

13 December 1884 Edinburgh Shield R4	Hibs	4–2	Hearts	Hibernian Park

=== Rosebery Charity Cup ===
21 March 1885 Rosebery Charity Cup SF	Hearts	2–1	Edinburgh University	Powderhall

25 April 1885 Rosebery Charity Cup Final	Hibs	3–0	Hearts	Powderhall

== See also ==
- List of Heart of Midlothian F.C. seasons
