= 1882–83 Heart of Midlothian F.C. season =

Heart of Midlothian
1882–83 season
- Scottish Cup: Round 3

Season 1882–83 was the eighth season in which Heart of Midlothian competed at a Scottish national level, entering the Scottish Cup for the eighth time.

== Overview ==
Hearts reached the third round of the Scottish Cup and were knocked out by Vale of Leven. They also reached the semi-final of the Edinburgh Fa Cup.

== Results ==
=== Scottish Cup ===
9 September 1882 Scottish Cup R1	Hearts	1–1	St Bernard's	Tynecastle Park

16 September 1882 Scottish Cup R1 Replay	St Bernard's	3–4	Hearts	Royal Gymnasium Ground

7 October 1882 Scottish Cup R2	Addiewell	0–14	Hearts	West Calder

21 October 1882 Scottish Cup R3	Vale of Leven	8–1	Hearts	Millburn Park

=== Edinburgh FA Cup ===
30 September 1882 Edinburgh FA Cup R1	Hearts	20–2	Holyrood	Tynecastle Park

28 October 1882 Edinburgh FA Cup R2	Hearts	8–1	Norton Park	Tynecastle Park

2 December 1882 Edinburgh FA Cup R3	West Calder	0–1	Hearts	Burngrange Park

13 January 1883 Edinburgh FA Cup R4	Hearts	3–0	Armadale	Tynecastle Park

10 February 1883 Edinburgh FA Cup SF	Edinburgh University	5–2	Hearts	Powderhall

=== Rosebery Charity Cup ===
10 March 1883 Rosebery Charity Cup SF	Hearts	3–1	Hibernian	Powderhall
				Attendance: 5,000

21 April 1883 Rosebery Charity Cup Final	St Bernard's	0–2	Hearts	Powderhall
				Attendance: 5,500

== See also ==
- List of Heart of Midlothian F.C. seasons
