= 1890–91 Heart of Midlothian F.C. season =

Heart of Midlothian
1890–91 season
- Stadium: Tynecastle Park
- Scottish Football League: 6th
- Scottish Cup: Winners
- East of Scotland Shield: Winners

The 1890–91 season is the 1st season of competitive football by Heart of Midlothian. Hearts also competed in the Scottish Cup, the Rosebery Charity Cup and the East of Scotland Shield.

== Overview ==
Hearts finished 6th in the league in its inaugural year, also going on to win the Scottish Cup for the first time.

== Results ==
=== Scottish Football League ===
16 August 1890 Scottish Football League	Rangers	5– 2	Heart of Midlothian	Ibrox Park

23 August 1890 Scottish Football League	Heart of Midlothian	0–5	Celtic	Tynecastle Park

30 August 1890 Scottish Football League	Dumbarton	3–1	Heart of Midlothian	Boghead Park

13 September 1890 Scottish Football League	Heart of Midlothian	4– 0	Cowlairs	Tynecastle Park

25 October 1890 Scottish Football League	Heart of Midlothian	8– 1	Vale of Leven	Tynecastle Park

24 January 1891 Scottish Football League	Heart of Midlothian	0– 1	Rangers	Tynecastle Park

14 February 1891 Scottish Football League	Heart of Midlothian	2– 2	Cambuslang	Tynecastle Park

21 February 1891 Scottish Football League	Heart of Midlothian	1– 0	St Mirren	Tynecastle Park

28 February 1891 Scottish Football League	Celtic	1–0	Heart of Midlothian	Celtic Park

7 March 1891 Scottish Football League	Cowlairs	1–2	Heart of Midlothian	Springvale Park

21 March 1891 Scottish Football League	Heart of Midlothian	4–1	Third Lanark	Tynecastle Park

28 March 1891 Scottish Football League	Heart of Midlothian	1–1	Abercorn	Tynecastle Park

11 April 1891 Scottish Football League	St Mirren	3–2	Heart of Midlothian	Westmarch Park

18 April 1891 Scottish Football League	Third Lanark	4–0	Heart of Midlothian	Cathkin Park

20 April 1891 Scottish Football League	Heart of Midlothian	0–4	Dumbarton	Tynecastle Park

25 April 1891 Scottish Football League	Abercorn	1–0	Heart of Midlothian	Underwood Park

2 May 1891 Scottish Football League	Cambuslang	2–0	Heart of Midlothian	Whitefield Park

9 May 1891 Scottish Football League	Vale of Leven	2–4	Heart of Midlothian	Millburn Park

=== Scottish cup ===
6 September 1890 Scottish Cup R1	Heart of Midlothian	7–2	Raith Rovers	Tynecastle Park

27 September 1890 Scottish Cup R2	Heart of Midlothian	Walk	Burntisland Thistle	Tynecastle Park

18 October 1890 Scottish Cup R3	Methlan Park	0–3	Heart of Midlothian	Edinburgh Exhibition Ground

8 November 1890 Scottish Cup R4	Ayr	3–4	Heart of Midlothian	Somerset Park

29 November 1890 Scottish Cup R5	Heart of Midlothian	5–1	Morton	Tynecastle Park

20 December 1890 Scottish Cup QF	Heart of Midlothian	3–1	East Stirlingshire	Tynecastle Park

31 January 1891 Scottish Cup SF	Third Lanark	1–4	Heart of Midlothian	Cathkin Park

7 February 1891 Scottish Cup Final	Heart of Midlothian	1–0	Dumbarton	Hampden Park

=== East of Scotland Shield ===
20 September 1890 East of Scotland Shield R1	Mossend Swifts	1–4	Hearts	Mossend Park

11 October 1890 East of Scotland Shield R2	Hearts	2–1	Hibernian	Tynecastle Park

30 October 1890 East of Scotland Shield R3	Hearts	Walk	Lochgelly United	Tynecastle Park

22 November 1890 East of Scotland Shield R4	Hearts	2–2	Leith Athletic	Tynecastle Park

6 December 1890 East of Scotland Shield R4 Replay	Hearts	4–1	Leith Athletic	Tynecastle Park

13 December 1890 East of Scotland Shield SF	Alloa Athletic	2–7	Hearts	Bellvue Park

14 March 1891 East of Scotland Shield Final	Hearts	3–0	Armadale	Tynecastle Park

=== Rosebery Charity Cup ===
23 May 1891 Rosebery Charity Cup SF	Mossend Swifts	2–2	Hearts	Mossend Park

27 June 1891 Rosebery Charity Cup Final	Leith Athletic	2–3	Hearts	Bank Park

=== Edinburgh International Exhibition Cup ===
6 August 1890 Edinburgh International Exhibition Cup	Hibernian	0 – 2	Hearts	Edinburgh Exhibition Ground (Meggetland)
			Scott 10'; Jenkinson	Attendance: 15,000; Referee: T. Gilhooly

== League table ==
Pos	Team	Pld	W	D	L	GF	GA	GD	Pts	Qualification or relegation
4	Cambuslang	18	8	4	6	47	42	+5	20	
5	3rd LRV	18	8	3	7	38	39	−1	15 (Note: Celtic, 3rd LRV and Cowlairs were deducted four points each for fielding ineligible players.)	
6	Heart of Midlothian	18	6	2	10	31	37	−6	14	
7	Abercorn	18	5	2	11	36	47	−11	12	
8	St Mirren	18	5	1	12	39	62	−23	11	Re-elected

Rules for classification: 1) Points;

== See also ==
- List of Heart of Midlothian F.C. seasons
