= 1885–86 Heart of Midlothian F.C. season =

Heart of Midlothian
1885–86 season
- Scottish Cup: Round 2

Season 1885–86 was the eleventh season in which Heart of Midlothian competed at a Scottish national level, entering the Scottish Cup for the eleventh time.

== Overview ==
Hearts reached the second round of the Scottish Cup and were knocked out by Edinburgh rivals Hibs. They had to play their first round tie twice due to a protest by St Bernard's they won both games.

== Results ==
=== Scottish Cup ===
12 September 1885 Scottish Cup R1	Hearts	5–2	St Bernard's	Tynecastle Park

26 September 1885 Scottish Cup R1 Replay	Hearts	1–0	St Bernard's	Tynecastle Park

3 October 1885 Scottish Cup R2	Hibs	2–1	Hearts	Hibernian Park

=== FA Cup ===
31 October 1885 FA Cup R1	Padiham	w/o	Hearts	Padiham

=== Edinburgh Shield ===
30 September 1885 East of Scotland Shield R1	Hearts	9–0	Easter	Tynecastle Park

31 October 1885 East of Scotland Shield R2	Hearts	5–2	Leith Harp	Tynecastle Park

14 November 1885 East of Scotland Shield R3	Bo'ness	2–4	Hearts	Soocrae Park

19 December 1885 East of Scotland Shield Final	Hibs	4–3	Hearts	Hibernian Park

=== Rosebery Charity Cup ===
17 April 1886 Rosebery Charity Cup SF	St Bernard's	0–0	Hearts	Powderhall

29 April 1886 Rosebery Charity Cup SF	St Bernard's	1–4	Hearts	Powderhall

24 June 1886 Rosebery Charity Cup Final	Hibs	0–1	Hearts	Powderhall

== See also ==
- List of Heart of Midlothian F.C. seasons
