= 1875–76 Edinburgh Football Association Cup =

1875-76 Edinburgh Football Association Cup
Tournament details
- Country: Scotland
- Venue: Edinburgh
- Dates: 20 November 1875 - 11 March 1876
- Teams: 4

Final positions
- Champions: 3rd E.R.V.
- Runners-up: Thistle

Tournament statistics
- Matches played: 3

The 1875–76 Edinburgh Football Association Cup was the first edition of the first regional football tournament played to Football Association laws.

== Background ==
The first Association match in Edinburgh was between sides raised by Queen's Park F.C. and Clydesdale F.C., on 27 December 1873, with a view to promoting Association laws; hitherto the existing football clubs in Edinburgh, such as Edinburgh Academical Football Club and schools such as Merchiston Castle School, had played under rugby union rules.

The Edinburgh Football Association was founded on 11 September 1875 at the Buchanan Hotel with four members:

- the 3rd Edinburgh Rifle Volunteers;
- the Thistle;
- Hanover, and
- Heart of Midlothan.

The original intention was to form "the Eastern branch of the Scottish Football Association", but as the Scottish FA refused permission to use the title, the Edinburgh Football Association was adopted as a name instead.

The Hibernian F.C. was refused permission to enter the EFA on the basis that "they played rough and affiliated clubs were asked not to play them". One of the key influences on the 3rd E.R.V. was John Hope, who had founded the Foot-Ball Club of Edinburgh in 1824, and who had raised a regiment which had been absorbed into the 3rd in 1867. Hope was staunchly Protestant, and led the opposition to having an "Irish" club in the association.

== Semi-finals ==
The EFA set up a competition for its members and all four entered. The first match "for the Eastern branch trophy" was played on 20 November 1875, between the Thistle and the Heart of Midlothian, and took place on the eastern part of the Meadows, as almost all of the early matches in Edinburgh did. Thistle won 1–0.

The other match, a de facto semi-final, on 11 December saw the 3rd E.R.V. beat Hanover 2–0, also on the Meadows.

== Final ==
The final was played on the Meadows on 11 March 1876, the same day as the 1876 Scottish Cup final. The Edinburgh final proved to be a one-sided affair, with the 3rd E.R.V. winning 6–0. The play was "very fast" and the forward play of the Volunteers "deserving of much praise".

11 March 1876

3rd Edinburgh Rifle Volunteers	6–0	Edinburgh Thistle

Meadows
Referee: Mr O'Brien (3rd) and Mr Donnelly (Thistle)

3rd E.R.V.	Edinburgh Thistle

3rd E.R.V.
GK	(Scotland) A. W. Lamont (captain)
FB	(Scotland) J. Stenhouse
FB	(Scotland) C. Utterson
HB	(Scotland) A. Mitchell
HB	(Scotland) J. Shaw
FW	(Scotland) T. Fraser
FW	(Scotland) D. Hogg
FW	(Scotland) J. Sinclair
FW	(Scotland) H. Stewart
FW	(Scotland) J. Wilkinson
FW	(Scotland) J. Wood

Thistle:
GK	(Scotland) Park
FB	(Scotland) M'George
FB	(Scotland) Wishart
HB	(Scotland) Henderson
HB	(Scotland) Johnston
FW	(Scotland) D. M'Intosh (captain)
FW	(Scotland) H. M'Intosh
FW	(Scotland) Fisher
FW	(Scotland) Cochrane
FW	(Scotland) M'Neil
FW	(Scotland) M'Donald

== Aftermath ==
The competition was barely noticed in the Edinburgh papers, only one report of the final mentioning the surnames of the players, and none mentioning the scorers in any of the ties. The final was not even mentioned in the Glasgow media, the North British Daily Mail listing two rugby fixtures in Edinburgh for 11 March, but not the Edinburgh Cup final. However the association game became the dominant code in Edinburgh, with much more comprehensive reporting, within a couple of years.

The Hibernian was allowed into the Edinburgh FA for 1876–77, following pressure from players of other clubs. That season, Thistle was awarded the trophy by default, as opponents the 3rd E.R.V. did not show up.

By 1879–80, the tournament had grown to 22 clubs; when the Hibs won the trophy for the third consecutive year in 1880–81, the club was awarded the trophy in perpetuity, and the competition renamed the Edinburgh Shield. Since 1889 it has been played for as the East of Scotland Shield.
