= 1889–90 Hibernian F.C. season =

Hibernian
1889–90 season
- Scottish Cup: R6

Season 1889–90 was the 14th season in which Hibernian competed at a Scottish national level, entering the Scottish Cup for the 13th time.

== Overview ==
Hibs reached the sixth round of the Scottish Cup, losing 6–2 to Abercorn.

== Results ==
All results are written with Hibs' score first.

=== Scottish Cup ===
Date	Round	Opponent	Venue	Result	Attendance	Scorers
7 September 1889	R1	Armadale	A	3–2		
28 September 1889	R2	Mossend Swifts	H	4–3	2,500	
19 October 1889	R3	Dunfermline Athletic	A	4–4		
26 October 1889	R3 R	Dunfermline Athletic	H	11–1	2,000	
9 November 1889	R4	Queen of the South Wanderers	A	7–3		
30 November 1889	R5	Bye in Round 6				
21 December 1889	R6	Abercorn	A	2–6	4,500	

== See also ==
- List of Hibernian F.C. seasons
