= Kinleith F.C. =

Association football club in Scotland

Kinleith
- Full name: Kinleith F.C.
- Founded: 1879
- Dissolved: 1884
- Ground: Kinleith Grounds
- Match Secretary: Walter M'Kenzie, Archibald Bird
Home colours

Kinleith F.C. was an association football team from Juniper Green, in the south-west outskirts of Edinburgh, active in the 1880s.

== History ==
The club was founded in 1879, and was linked to the Kinleith Paper Mill. Its first recorded game was a 1–1 draw with the Ashley club at home in April 1880 and its first competitive match was a 3–2 home defeat to Hanover in the Edinburgh Shield in 1880–81; a Kinleith protest was dismissed.

Kinleith joined the Scottish Football Association in August 1881, and entered the 1881–82 Scottish Cup. It was the smallest senior side in the Edinburgh district, and was lucky enough to draw West Calder, rather than one of the bigger city sides, but West Calder was still easily strong enough to beat Kinleith. After a misunderstanding led to Kinleith not turning up to the original tie, West Calder won the rearranged match 5–1, four goals coming in the second half.

The club did win two ties in the Edinburgh Shield that season, 8–0 against St Lennox in the first round and 4–0 against Armadale in the second, but lost 6–0 to Hibernian in the third.

Kinleith never grew its membership substantially, and remained the smallest side in Edinburgh for its existence. Its final Scottish Cup tie in 1883–84, in first round against Edina, a side which had never won a Cup tie, seemingly ended in an Edina victory; Kinleith protested on "several" grounds, the most prominent one being that the referee was a member of the Edina. During what appears to have been a fractious debate, at one point it was mooted that both clubs be thrown out of the competition, before the Scottish FA ordered a replay, with an allowance of half-an-hour for extra time. Kinleith's obvious problems with keeping people interested in a constantly losing cause was demonstrated by it only mustering 9 players for the replay, and losing 4–0.

The club was struck from the Scottish FA's register in August 1884. It entered the 1884–85 Edinburgh Shield but an 8–1 home defeat to Glencairn in the third round was the club's last reported match.

== Colours ==
The club wore Oxford and Cambridge blue hooped jerseys, white knickers, and red hose.

== Ground ==
The club's home was simply called the Kinleith Grounds, and was about half-a-mile from Kinleith Mill railway station.
