= Frank Watt (football manager) =

Scottish football manager (died 1932)

Frank George Watt (ca. 1854 – 26 February 1932) was the first unofficial manager of Newcastle United Football Club. A former referee, Watt was appointed secretary in December 1895 and held the position until 1930. He did not control the team's selection, so technically he was not the manager in a modern sense; this role was unheard of, and the club was run by a committee, overseen by the club secretary. Newcastle's first official manager was Andy Cunningham in 1930. Watt was also a member of the committee that owned the club at the time. He was very influential, referred to as "The Guv'nor". He was a portly figure with a handlebar moustache.

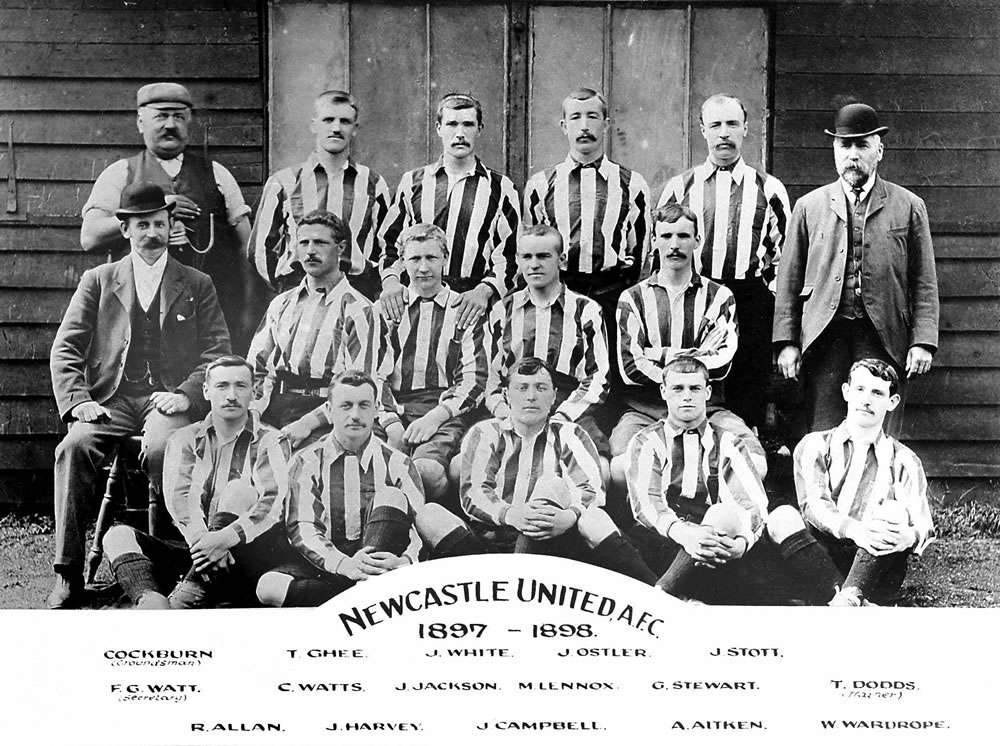
Newcastle United 1897/98-Season. FG Watts is middle row left

A Scotsman, Watt's first involvement in football came with the 3rd E.R.V. club in Edinburgh, leaving the club with a number of other players to form Edinburgh Swifts, with both sides combining his playing role with that of club secretary. He was later appointed secretary of the Edinburgh (later East of Scotland) Football Association before leaving for Tyneside.

Watt had great ambitions for Newcastle. Upon arrival he declared "We're going to be the best team in the country." The Edwardian Newcastle side dominated the league with a side assembled entirely by Watt, who also signed players such as Hughie Gallacher, Colin Veitch and Stan Seymour throughout his 37 years at the club, players who are still considered legends today (however, he initially turned down Seymour, explaining that the future Mr. Newcastle was "too small to play football").

During his time at Newcastle, the club won the old First Division four times in 1905, 1907, 1909 and 1927. They won the FA Cup in 1910 and 1924 and were finalists on four more occasions, in 1905, 1906, 1908 and 1911. When he retired in 1930, his son of the same name took on his job with the club until his own death in 1950.

For most of his tenure Watt's trainer, who retired along with him in 1930, was James Quar McPherson, who took on the role in 1903. McPherson's duties were taken on by his son Jim (who had coached the Norwegian national side at the 1920 Olympics, as well as clubs in the Netherlands and Germany including FC Bayern Munich during the 1920s) until May 1938.

F.G. Watt, "the man who made Newcastle United", died on 26 February 1932 in his house in Newcastle at the age of 77.

== Career statistics ==
Managerial record by team and tenure
Team	From	To	Record				
Team	From	To	P	W	D	L	Win %
Newcastle United	1892	31 September 1929	1,264	575	269	420	45.5
Total			1,264	575	269	420	45.5

== Honours ==
First Division

- Champions: 1904–05, 1906–07, 1908–09, 1926–27

FA Cup

- Winners: 1909–10, 1923–24

FA Charity Shield

- Winners: 1909

Sheriff of London Charity Shield

- Winners: 1906–07
