= 1884–85 Hibernian F.C. season =

Hibernian
1884–85 season
- Scottish Cup: Semi-finalists

Season 1884–85 was the 9th season in which Hibernian competed at a Scottish national level, entering the Scottish Cup for the 8th time.

== Overview ==
Hibs reached the semi-final of the Scottish Cup, losing 2–1 to the Renton.

== Results ==
All results are written with Hibs' score first.

=== Scottish Cup ===
Date	Round	Opponent	Venue	Result	Attendance	Scorers
13 September 1884	R1	Bo'ness	A	2–0		
4 October 1884	R2	Vale of Teith	H	5–1		
25 October 1884	R3	Glengowan	H	5–1		
15 November 1884	R4	Ayr	H	5–1		
6 December 1884	R5	Morton	H	4–0		
27 December 1884	R6	Annbank	H	5–0		
24 January 1885	SF	Renton	H	2–3	7,000	

== See also ==
- List of Hibernian F.C. seasons
