= 1881–82 Heart of Midlothian F.C. season =

Heart of Midlothian
1881–82 season
- Scottish Cup: Round 1

Season 1881–82 was the seventh season in which Heart of Midlothian competed at a Scottish national level, entering the Scottish Cup for the seventh time.

In April 1882 Hearts lost 2-6 at home to Aston Villa.

== Overview ==
Hearts were knocked out in the first round of the Scottish Cup by St Bernard's.

Later in the season they reached the second round of the Edinburgh FA Cup being beaten by rival Hibs.

== Results ==
=== Scottish Cup ===
10 September 1881 Scottish Cup R1	St Bernard's	1–0	Hearts	Royal Gymnasium Ground

=== Edinburgh FA Cup ===
24 September 1881 Edinburgh FA Cup R1	Hearts	6–0	Edina	Tynecastle Park

1 October 1881 Edinburgh FA Cup R2	Hearts	2–4	Hibs	Tynecastle Park

== See also ==
- List of Heart of Midlothian F.C. seasons
