= List of Heart of Midlothian F.C. seasons =

This is a list of seasons played by Heart of Midlothian F.C. in both Scottish and European football, from when the club first entered the Scottish Cup in 1875 to the present day. It details the club's achievements in major competitions for each season, as well as giving the top goalscorer and average attendance by supporters.

Note: The Top Goalscorer column includes goals scored in all competitions whereas the Average Attendance column only includes the figures given for home league matches.

== Seasons ==
Season	League										Scottish Cup	League Cup	Europe		Top Goalscorer(s)		Average Attendance
Season	Division	Pld	W	D	L	GF	GA	GD	Pts	Pos	Scottish Cup	League Cup	Europe		Player(s)	Goals	Average Attendance
1875–76	(Note: The Scottish Football League was not formed until 1890.)										Second Round	(Note: The League Cup competition did not start until the 1946–47 season.)	(Note: European club competitions did not begin until the 1955–56 season.)				
1876–77	(Note: The Scottish Football League was not formed until 1890.)										First Round	(Note: The League Cup competition did not start until the 1946–47 season.)	(Note: European club competitions did not begin until the 1955–56 season.)				
1877–78	(Note: The Scottish Football League was not formed until 1890.)										First Round	(Note: The League Cup competition did not start until the 1946–47 season.)	(Note: European club competitions did not begin until the 1955–56 season.)				
1878–79	(Note: The Scottish Football League was not formed until 1890.)										Fourth round	(Note: The League Cup competition did not start until the 1946–47 season.)	(Note: European club competitions did not begin until the 1955–56 season.)				
1879–80	(Note: The Scottish Football League was not formed until 1890.)										Third Round	(Note: The League Cup competition did not start until the 1946–47 season.)	(Note: European club competitions did not begin until the 1955–56 season.)				
1880–81	(Note: The Scottish Football League was not formed until 1890.)										Fifth round	(Note: The League Cup competition did not start until the 1946–47 season.)	(Note: European club competitions did not begin until the 1955–56 season.)				
1881–82	(Note: The Scottish Football League was not formed until 1890.)										First Round	(Note: The League Cup competition did not start until the 1946–47 season.)	(Note: European club competitions did not begin until the 1955–56 season.)				
1882–83	(Note: The Scottish Football League was not formed until 1890.)										Third Round	(Note: The League Cup competition did not start until the 1946–47 season.)	(Note: European club competitions did not begin until the 1955–56 season.)				
1883–84	(Note: The Scottish Football League was not formed until 1890.)										Third Round	(Note: The League Cup competition did not start until the 1946–47 season.)	(Note: European club competitions did not begin until the 1955–56 season.)				
1884–85	(Note: The Scottish Football League was not formed until 1890.)										Second Round	(Note: The League Cup competition did not start until the 1946–47 season.)	(Note: European club competitions did not begin until the 1955–56 season.)				
1885–86	(Note: The Scottish Football League was not formed until 1890.)										Second Round	(Note: The League Cup competition did not start until the 1946–47 season.)	(Note: European club competitions did not begin until the 1955–56 season.)				
1886–87	(Note: The Scottish Football League was not formed until 1890.)										Third Round	(Note: The League Cup competition did not start until the 1946–47 season.)	(Note: European club competitions did not begin until the 1955–56 season.)				
1887–88	(Note: The Scottish Football League was not formed until 1890.)										Fourth round	(Note: The League Cup competition did not start until the 1946–47 season.)	(Note: European club competitions did not begin until the 1955–56 season.)				
1888–89	(Note: The Scottish Football League was not formed until 1890.)										Fourth round	(Note: The League Cup competition did not start until the 1946–47 season.)	(Note: European club competitions did not begin until the 1955–56 season.)				
1889–90	(Note: The Scottish Football League was not formed until 1890.)										Fifth round	(Note: The League Cup competition did not start until the 1946–47 season.)	(Note: European club competitions did not begin until the 1955–56 season.)				
1890–91	Scottish Football League	18	6	2	10	31	37	-6	14	6th	Winners	(Note: The League Cup competition did not start until the 1946–47 season.)	(Note: European club competitions did not begin until the 1955–56 season.)		George Scott	13	3,388
1891–92	Scottish Football League	22	15	4	3	65	35	+30	34	3rd	Quarter-Final	(Note: The League Cup competition did not start until the 1946–47 season.)	(Note: European club competitions did not begin until the 1955–56 season.)		James Fairbairn	17	3,681
1892–93	Scottish Football League	18	8	2	8	39	41	-2	18	5th	Quarter-Final	(Note: The League Cup competition did not start until the 1946–47 season.)	(Note: European club competitions did not begin until the 1955–56 season.)		George Scott	8	3,611
1893–94	Scottish Division One	18	11	4	3	46	32	+14	26	2nd	First Round	(Note: The League Cup competition did not start until the 1946–47 season.)	(Note: European club competitions did not begin until the 1955–56 season.)		Willie Michael	10	5,444
1894–95	Scottish Division One	18	15	1	2	50	18	+32	31	1st	Semi-Final	(Note: The League Cup competition did not start until the 1946–47 season.)	(Note: European club competitions did not begin until the 1955–56 season.)		Willie Michael	13	6,166
1895–96	Scottish Division One	18	11	0	7	68	36	+32	22	4th	Winners	(Note: The League Cup competition did not start until the 1946–47 season.)	(Note: European club competitions did not begin until the 1955–56 season.)		Davie Baird	18	7,833
1896–97	Scottish Division One	18	13	2	3	47	22	+25	28	1st	Second Round	(Note: The League Cup competition did not start until the 1946–47 season.)	(Note: European club competitions did not begin until the 1955–56 season.)		Willie Taylor	11	5,900
1897–98	Scottish Division One	18	8	4	6	54	33	+21	20	4th	Quarter-Final	(Note: The League Cup competition did not start until the 1946–47 season.)	(Note: European club competitions did not begin until the 1955–56 season.)		Tom Robertson James Sharp	10	5,888
1898–99	Scottish Division One	18	12	2	4	56	30	+26	26	2nd	First Round	(Note: The League Cup competition did not start until the 1946–47 season.)	(Note: European club competitions did not begin until the 1955–56 season.)		George Livingston Willie Michael	13	7,611
1899–1900	Scottish Division One	18	10	3	5	41	24	+17	23	4th	Semi-Final	(Note: The League Cup competition did not start until the 1946–47 season.)	(Note: European club competitions did not begin until the 1955–56 season.)		Willie Michael	17	6,411
1900–01	Scottish Division One	20	5	4	11	22	30	-8	14	10th	Winners	(Note: The League Cup competition did not start until the 1946–47 season.)	(Note: European club competitions did not begin until the 1955–56 season.)		Bill Porteous	9	5,300
1901–02	Scottish Division One	18	10	2	6	32	21	+11	22	3rd	Quarter-Final	(Note: The League Cup competition did not start until the 1946–47 season.)	(Note: European club competitions did not begin until the 1955–56 season.)		Charlie Thomson	9	6,444
1902–03	Scottish Division One	22	11	6	5	46	27	+19	28	4th	Final	(Note: The League Cup competition did not start until the 1946–47 season.)	(Note: European club competitions did not begin until the 1955–56 season.)		Bill Porteous	14	6,409
1903–04	Scottish Division One	26	18	3	5	63	35	+28	39	2nd	First Round	(Note: The League Cup competition did not start until the 1946–47 season.)	(Note: European club competitions did not begin until the 1955–56 season.)		Bill Porteous Bobby Walker	13	8,015
1904–05	Scottish Division One	26	11	3	12	46	44	+2	25	7th	Second Round	(Note: The League Cup competition did not start until the 1946–47 season.)	(Note: European club competitions did not begin until the 1955–56 season.)		Bobby Walker	14	6,269
1905–06	Scottish Division One	30	18	7	5	64	27	+37	43	2nd	Winners	(Note: The League Cup competition did not start until the 1946–47 season.)	(Note: European club competitions did not begin until the 1955–56 season.)		Alex Menzies	22	7,666
1906–07	Scottish Division One	34	11	13	10	46	43	+3	35	9th	Final	(Note: The League Cup competition did not start until the 1946–47 season.)	(Note: European club competitions did not begin until the 1955–56 season.)		Bobby Walker	8	5,835
1907–08	Scottish Division One	34	11	6	17	50	62	-12	28	11th	Quarter-Final	(Note: The League Cup competition did not start until the 1946–47 season.)	(Note: European club competitions did not begin until the 1955–56 season.)		Bobby Walker	10	8,706
1908–09	Scottish Division One	34	12	8	14	54	49	+5	32	11th	Second Round	(Note: The League Cup competition did not start until the 1946–47 season.)	(Note: European club competitions did not begin until the 1955–56 season.)		Philip Cole	8	7,794
1909–10	Scottish Division One	34	12	7	15	59	50	+9	31	12th	Quarter-Final	(Note: The League Cup competition did not start until the 1946–47 season.)	(Note: European club competitions did not begin until the 1955–56 season.)		George Buchanan	12	7,853
1910–11	Scottish Division One	34	8	8	18	42	59	-17	24	14th	First Round	(Note: The League Cup competition did not start until the 1946–47 season.)	(Note: European club competitions did not begin until the 1955–56 season.)		Richard Harker	9	9,088
1911–12	Scottish Division One	34	16	8	10	54	40	+14	40	4th	Semi-Final	(Note: The League Cup competition did not start until the 1946–47 season.)	(Note: European club competitions did not begin until the 1955–56 season.)		Percy Dawson	18	10,529
1912–13	Scottish Division One	34	17	7	10	71	43	+28	41	3rd	Semi-Final	(Note: The League Cup competition did not start until the 1946–47 season.)	(Note: European club competitions did not begin until the 1955–56 season.)		Percy Dawson	27	10,676
1913–14	Scottish Division One	38	23	8	7	70	29	+41	54	3rd	Second Round	(Note: The League Cup competition did not start until the 1946–47 season.)	(Note: European club competitions did not begin until the 1955–56 season.)		Percy Dawson	23	13,131
1914–15	Scottish Division One	38	27	7	4	83	32	+51	61	2nd	(Note: The Scottish Cup was not held between 1914–15 and 1918–19 due to World War I.)	(Note: The League Cup competition did not start until the 1946–47 season.)	(Note: European club competitions did not begin until the 1955–56 season.)		Tom Gracie	29	11,157
1915–16	Scottish Division One	37	20	6	11	66	45	+21	46	5th	(Note: The Scottish Cup was not held between 1914–15 and 1918–19 due to World War I.)	(Note: The League Cup competition did not start until the 1946–47 season.)	(Note: European club competitions did not begin until the 1955–56 season.)		Fletcher Welsh	18	7,631
1916–17	Scottish Division One	38	14	4	20	44	59	-15	32	14th	(Note: The Scottish Cup was not held between 1914–15 and 1918–19 due to World War I.)	(Note: The League Cup competition did not start until the 1946–47 season.)	(Note: European club competitions did not begin until the 1955–56 season.)		Albert Denyer	6	6,289
1917–18	Scottish Division One	34	14	4	16	41	58	-17	32	10th	(Note: The Scottish Cup was not held between 1914–15 and 1918–19 due to World War I.)	(Note: The League Cup competition did not start until the 1946–47 season.)	(Note: European club competitions did not begin until the 1955–56 season.)		John Sharp	10	7,500
1918–19	Scottish Division One	34	14	9	11	59	52	+7	37	7th	(Note: The Scottish Cup was not held between 1914–15 and 1918–19 due to World War I.)	(Note: The League Cup competition did not start until the 1946–47 season.)	(Note: European club competitions did not begin until the 1955–56 season.)		Andy Wilson	20	9,735
1919–20	Scottish Division One	42	14	9	19	57	72	-15	37	15th	Third Round	(Note: The League Cup competition did not start until the 1946–47 season.)	(Note: European club competitions did not begin until the 1955–56 season.)		Arthur Lochhead	13	16,223
1920–21	Scottish Division One	42	20	10	12	74	49	+25	50	3rd	Semi-Final	(Note: The League Cup competition did not start until the 1946–47 season.)	(Note: European club competitions did not begin until the 1955–56 season.)		Freddie Forbes	23	17,928
1921–22	Scottish Division One	42	11	10	21	50	60	-10	32	19th	Third Round	(Note: The League Cup competition did not start until the 1946–47 season.)	(Note: European club competitions did not begin until the 1955–56 season.)		Freddie Forbes	13	17,071
1922–23	Scottish Division One	38	11	15	12	51	50	+1	37	12th	Second Round	(Note: The League Cup competition did not start until the 1946–47 season.)	(Note: European club competitions did not begin until the 1955–56 season.)		Jock White	33	17,105
1923–24	Scottish Division One	38	14	10	14	61	50	+11	38	9th	Quarter-Final	(Note: The League Cup competition did not start until the 1946–47 season.)	(Note: European club competitions did not begin until the 1955–56 season.)		Jock White	20	16,368
1924–25	Scottish Division One	38	12	11	15	64	68	-4	35	10th	Second Round	(Note: The League Cup competition did not start until the 1946–47 season.)	(Note: European club competitions did not begin until the 1955–56 season.)		Jock White	24	17,500
1925–26	Scottish Division One	38	21	8	9	87	56	+31	50	3rd	Third Round	(Note: The League Cup competition did not start until the 1946–47 season.)	(Note: European club competitions did not begin until the 1955–56 season.)		Jock White	27	18,474
1926–27	Scottish Division One	38	12	11	15	65	64	+1	35	13th	First Round	(Note: The League Cup competition did not start until the 1946–47 season.)	(Note: European club competitions did not begin until the 1955–56 season.)		Jock White	15	17,026
1927–28	Scottish Division One	38	20	7	11	89	50	+39	47	4th	Third Round	(Note: The League Cup competition did not start until the 1946–47 season.)	(Note: European club competitions did not begin until the 1955–56 season.)		Lachlan McMillan	22	16,763
1928–29	Scottish Division One	38	19	9	10	91	57	+34	47	4th	First Round	(Note: The League Cup competition did not start until the 1946–47 season.)	(Note: European club competitions did not begin until the 1955–56 season.)		Barney Battles, Jr.	31	18,921
1929–30	Scottish Division One	38	14	9	15	69	69	0	37	10th	Semi-Final	(Note: The League Cup competition did not start until the 1946–47 season.)	(Note: European club competitions did not begin until the 1955–56 season.)		Barney Battles, Jr.	33	16,737
1930–31	Scottish Division One	38	19	6	13	90	63	+27	44	5th	Second Round	(Note: The League Cup competition did not start until the 1946–47 season.)	(Note: European club competitions did not begin until the 1955–56 season.)		Barney Battles, Jr.	47	17,789
1931–32	Scottish Division One	38	17	5	16	63	61	+2	39	8th	Third Round	(Note: The League Cup competition did not start until the 1946–47 season.)	(Note: European club competitions did not begin until the 1955–56 season.)		Barney Battles, Jr.	20	15,449
1932–33	Scottish Division One	38	21	8	9	84	51	+33	50	3rd	Semi-Final	(Note: The League Cup competition did not start until the 1946–47 season.)	(Note: European club competitions did not begin until the 1955–56 season.)		Jock White	23	16,134
1933–34	Scottish Division One	38	17	10	11	86	59	+27	44	6th	Third Round	(Note: The League Cup competition did not start until the 1946–47 season.)	(Note: European club competitions did not begin until the 1955–56 season.)		Jock White	18	14,400
1934–35	Scottish Division One	38	20	10	8	87	51	+36	50	3rd	Semi-Final	(Note: The League Cup competition did not start until the 1946–47 season.)	(Note: European club competitions did not begin until the 1955–56 season.)		Dave McCulloch	39	18,655
1935–36	Scottish Division One	38	20	7	11	88	55	+33	47	5th	First Round	(Note: The League Cup competition did not start until the 1946–47 season.)	(Note: European club competitions did not begin until the 1955–56 season.)		Tommy Walker	18	18,363
1936–37	Scottish Division One	38	24	3	11	99	60	+39	51	5th	Third Round	(Note: The League Cup competition did not start until the 1946–47 season.)	(Note: European club competitions did not begin until the 1955–56 season.)		Andy Black	33	20,087
1937–38	Scottish Division One	38	26	6	6	90	50	+40	58	2nd	First Round	(Note: The League Cup competition did not start until the 1946–47 season.)	(Note: European club competitions did not begin until the 1955–56 season.)		Andy Black	39	20,173
1938–39	Scottish Division One	38	20	5	13	98	70	+28	45	4th	Third Round	(Note: The League Cup competition did not start until the 1946–47 season.)	(Note: European club competitions did not begin until the 1955–56 season.)		Archie Garrett	27	18,309
1939–40	Competitive football was suspended from 1939–40 to 1945–46 due to World War II.																
1940–41	Competitive football was suspended from 1939–40 to 1945–46 due to World War II.																
1941–42	Competitive football was suspended from 1939–40 to 1945–46 due to World War II.																
1942–43	Competitive football was suspended from 1939–40 to 1945–46 due to World War II.																
1943–44	Competitive football was suspended from 1939–40 to 1945–46 due to World War II.																
1944–45	Competitive football was suspended from 1939–40 to 1945–46 due to World War II.																
1945–46	Competitive football was suspended from 1939–40 to 1945–46 due to World War II.																
1946–47	Scottish Division One	30	16	6	8	52	43	+9	38	4th	Quarter-Final	Semi-Final			Archie Kelly	15	19,570
1947–48	Scottish Division One	30	10	8	12	37	42	-5	28	9th	Second Round	Quarter-Final			Archie Kelly	11	22,694
1948–49	Scottish Division One	30	12	6	12	64	54	+10	30	8th	Quarter-Final	Group stage			Willie Bauld	24	28,195
1949–50	Scottish Division One	30	20	3	7	86	40	+46	43	3rd	Second Round	Group stage			Willie Bauld	40	27,811
1950–51	Scottish Division One	30	16	5	9	72	45	+27	37	4th	Third Round	Group stage			Alfie Conn, Sr. Jimmy Wardhaugh	24	23,917
1951–52	Scottish Division One	30	14	7	9	69	53	+16	35	4th	Semi-Final	Group stage			Willie Bauld	27	25,238
1952–53	Scottish Division One	30	12	6	12	59	50	+9	30	4th	Semi-Final	Group stage			Willie Bauld	17	22,377
1953–54	Scottish Division One	30	16	6	8	70	45	+25	38	2nd	Quarter-Final	Group stage			Jimmy Wardhaugh	34	26,248
1954–55	Scottish Division One	30	16	7	7	74	45	+29	39	4th	Quarter-Final	Winners			Willie Bauld	39	23,133
1955–56	Scottish Division One	34	19	7	8	99	47	+52	45	3rd	Winners	Quarter-Final	Did not qualify		Jimmy Wardhaugh	34	23,588
1956–57	Scottish Division One	34	24	5	5	81	48	+33	53	2nd	Fifth Round	Group stage	Did not qualify		Jimmy Wardhaugh	29	23,882
1957–58	Scottish Division One	34	29	4	1	132	29	+103	62	1st	Third Round	Group stage	Did not qualify		Jimmy Wardhaugh	37	24,118
1958–59	Scottish Division One	34	21	6	7	92	51	+41	48	2nd	Second Round	Winners	European Cup	Preliminary Round	Willie Bauld	26	21,471
1959–60	Scottish Division One	34	23	8	3	102	51	+51	54	1st	Second Round	Winners	Did not qualify		Alex Young	28	23,059
1960–61	Scottish Division One	34	13	8	13	51	53	-2	34	7th	Quarter-Final	Group stage	European Cup	Preliminary Round	Bobby Blackwood	14	20,294
1961–62	Scottish Division One	34	16	6	12	55	49	+6	39	6th	Third Round	Final	Inter-Cities Fairs Cup	Second Round	Willie Wallace	12	13,592
1962–63	Scottish Division One	34	17	9	8	85	59	+26	43	5th	Second Round	Winners	Did not qualify		Willie Wallace	25	12,778
1963–64	Scottish Division One	34	19	9	6	74	40	+34	47	4th	Third Round	Group stage	Inter-Cities Fairs Cup	First Round	Willie Wallace	28	14,037
1964–65	Scottish Division One	34	22	6	6	90	49	+41	50	2nd	Quarter-Final	Group stage	Did not qualify		Willie Wallace	25	16,682
1965–66	Scottish Division One	34	13	12	9	56	48	+8	38	7th	Quarter-Final	Group stage	Inter-Cities Fairs Cup	Third Round	Willie Wallace	28	12,120
1966–67	Scottish Division One	34	11	8	15	39	48	-9	30	11th	First Round	Group stage	Did not qualify		Willie Wallace	9	10,188
1967–68	Scottish Division One	34	13	4	17	56	61	-5	30	12th	Final	Group stage	Did not qualify		Donald Ford	16	11,136
1968–69	Scottish Division One	34	14	8	12	52	54	-2	36	8th	Second Round	Group stage	Did not qualify		Donald Ford	10	11,544
1969–70	Scottish Division One	34	13	12	9	50	36	+14	38	4th	Second Round	Group stage	Did not qualify		Donald Ford	8	12,473
1970–71	Scottish Division One	34	13	7	14	41	40	+1	33	11th	Fourth Round	Group stage	Did not qualify		Donald Ford	15	11,668
1971–72	Scottish Division One	34	13	13	8	53	49	+4	39	6th	Quarter-Final	Group stage	Did not qualify		Donald Ford	19	11,196
1972–73	Scottish Division One	34	12	6	16	39	50	-11	30	10th	Third Round	Group stage	Did not qualify		Donald Ford	12	10,213
1973–74	Scottish Division One	34	14	10	10	54	43	+11	38	6th	Semi-Final	Group stage	Did not qualify		Donald Ford	29	11,733
1974–75	Scottish Division One	34	11	13	10	47	52	-5	35	8th	Quarter-Final	Quarter-Final	Did not qualify		Donald Ford	18	12,225
1975–76	Scottish Premier Division	36	13	9	14	39	45	-6	35	5th	Final	Group stage	Did not qualify		Drew Busby	14	12,677
1976–77	Scottish Premier Division	36	7	13	16	49	66	-17	27	9th	Semi-Final	Semi-Final	European Cup Winners' Cup	Second Round	Willie Gibson	24	11,696
1977–78	Scottish First Division	39	24	10	5	77	42	+35	58	2nd	Fourth Round	Semi-Final	Did not qualify		Willie Gibson	22	9,863
1978–79	Scottish Premier Division	36	8	7	21	39	71	-32	23	9th	Quarter-Final	Second Round	Did not qualify		Derek O'Connor	9	10,831
1979–80	Scottish First Division	39	20	13	6	58	39	+19	53	1st	Quarter-Final	Second Round	Did not qualify		Willie Gibson	18	5,735
1980–81	Scottish Premier Division	36	6	6	24	27	71	-44	18	10th	Third Round	Third Round	Did not qualify		Alex MacDonald Chris Robertson	5	7,759
1981–82	Scottish First Division	39	21	8	10	65	37	+28	50	3rd	Fourth Round	Group stage	Did not qualify		Willie Pettigrew	16	5,157
1982–83	Scottish First Division	39	22	10	7	79	38	+41	54	2nd	Quarter-Final	Semi-Final	Did not qualify		Derek O'Connor	22	5,908
1983–84	Scottish Premier Division	36	10	16	10	38	47	-9	36	5th	Fourth Round	Third Round	Did not qualify		John Robertson	20	11,914
1984–85	Scottish Premier Division	36	13	5	18	47	64	-17	31	7th	Quarter-Final	Semi-Final	UEFA Cup	First Round	John Robertson	13	11,305
1985–86	Scottish Premier Division	36	20	10	6	59	33	+26	50	2nd	Final	Quarter-Final	Did not qualify		John Robertson	25	16,198
1986–87	Scottish Premier Division	44	21	14	9	64	43	+21	56	5th	Semi-Final	Second Round	UEFA Cup	First Round	John Robertson	19	14,531
1987–88	Scottish Premier Division	44	23	16	5	74	32	+42	62	2nd	Semi-Final	Quarter-Final	Did not qualify		John Robertson	31	16,633
1988–89	Scottish Premier Division	36	9	13	14	35	42	-7	31	6th	Quarter-Final	Semi-Final	UEFA Cup	Quarter-Final	Iain Ferguson	11	15,367
1989–90	Scottish Premier Division	36	16	12	8	54	35	+19	44	3rd	Quarter-Final	Quarter-Final	Did not qualify		John Robertson	22	15,694
1990–91	Scottish Premier Division	36	14	7	15	48	55	-7	35	5th	Third Round	Quarter-Final	UEFA Cup	Second Round	John Robertson	16	13,232
1991–92	Scottish Premier Division	44	27	9	8	60	37	+23	63	2nd	Semi-Final	Quarter-Final	Did not qualify		John Robertson	20	13,317
1992–93	Scottish Premier Division	44	15	14	15	46	51	-5	44	5th	Semi-Final	Quarter-Final	UEFA Cup	Second Round	John Robertson	15	9,829
1993–94	Scottish Premier Division	44	11	20	13	37	43	-6	42	7th	Quarter-Final	Third Round	UEFA Cup	First Round	John Robertson	12	11,010
1994–95	Scottish Premier Division	36	12	7	17	44	51	-7	43	6th	Semi-Final	Third Round	Did not qualify		John Robertson	14	10,123
1995–96	Scottish Premier Division	36	16	7	13	55	53	+2	55	4th	Final	Quarter-Final	Did not qualify		John Robertson	14	12,078
1996–97	Scottish Premier Division	36	14	10	12	46	43	+3	52	4th	Fourth Round	Final	UEFA Cup Winners' Cup	Qualifying Round	John Robertson	19	12,349
1997–98	Scottish Premier Division	36	19	10	7	70	46	+24	67	3rd	Winners	Quarter-Final	Did not qualify		Jim Hamilton	15	15,337
1998–99	Scottish Premier League	36	11	9	16	44	50	-6	42	6th	Third Round	Semi-Final	UEFA Cup Winners' Cup	First Round	Stéphane Adam Jim Hamilton	10	14,233
1999–2000	Scottish Premier League	36	15	9	12	47	40	+7	54	3rd	Quarter-Final	Quarter-Final	Did not qualify		Gary McSwegan	15	14,246
2000–01	Scottish Premier League	38	14	10	14	56	50	+6	52	5th	Quarter-Final	Quarter-Final	UEFA Cup	First Round	Colin Cameron	16	12,771
2001–02	Scottish Premier League	38	14	6	18	52	57	-5	48	5th	Fourth Round	Second Round	Did not qualify		Ricardo Fuller Kevin McKenna	9	12,080
2002–03	Scottish Premier League	38	18	9	11	57	51	+6	63	3rd	Third Round	Semi-Final	Did not qualify		Mark de Vries	15	12,058
2003–04	Scottish Premier League	38	19	11	8	56	40	+16	68	3rd	Fourth Round	Quarter-Final	UEFA Cup	Second Round	Mark de Vries	15	11,961
2004–05	Scottish Premier League	38	13	11	14	43	41	+2	50	5th	Semi-Final	Semi-Final	UEFA Cup	Group stage (Group A, 5th)	Paul Hartley	15	12,272
2005–06	Scottish Premier League	38	22	8	8	71	31	+40	74	2nd	Winners	Third Round	Did not qualify		Paul Hartley Rudi Skácel	17	16,767
2006–07	Scottish Premier League	38	17	10	11	47	35	+12	61	4th	Fourth Round	Quarter-Final	UEFA Champions League UEFA Cup	Third Qualifying Round First Round	Andrius Velička	12	16,937
2007–08	Scottish Premier League	38	13	9	16	47	55	-8	48	8th	Fourth Round	Semi-Final	Did not qualify		Andrius Velička	14	15,930
2008–09	Scottish Premier League	38	16	11	11	40	37	+3	59	3rd	Fifth Round	Second Round	Did not qualify		Bruno Aguiar	7	14,398
2009–10	Scottish Premier League	38	13	9	16	35	46	-11	48	6th	Fourth Round	Semi-Final	UEFA Europa League	Play-Off Round	Michael Stewart	8	14,484
2010–11	Scottish Premier League	38	18	9	11	53	45	+8	63	3rd	Fourth Round	Third Round	Did not qualify		Rudi Skácel	13	14,185
2011–12	Scottish Premier League	38	15	7	16	45	43	+2	52	5th	Winners	Third Round	UEFA Europa League	Play-Off Round	Rudi Skácel	18	13,381
2012–13	Scottish Premier League	38	11	11	16	40	49	-9	44	10th	Fourth Round	Final	UEFA Europa League	Play-Off Round	John Sutton	8	13,163
2013–14	Scottish Premiership	38	10	8	20	45	65	-20	23 (Note: Hearts were deducted 15 points for entering administration on 19 June 2013.)	12th	Fourth Round	Semi-Final	Did not qualify		Callum Paterson	11	14,123
2014–15	Scottish Championship	36	29	4	3	96	26	+70	91	1st	Fourth Round	Third Round	Did not qualify		Osman Sow Género Zeefuik	12	15,984
2015–16	Scottish Premiership	38	18	11	9	59	40	+19	65	3rd	Fifth Round	Quarter-Final	Did not qualify		Juanma Delgado	13	16,423
2016–17	Scottish Premiership	38	12	10	16	55	52	+3	46	5th	Fifth Round	Second Round	UEFA Europa League	Second Qualifying Round	Jamie Walker	15	16,323
2017–18	Scottish Premiership	38	12	13	13	39	39	0	49	6th	Quarter-Final	Group stage	Did not qualify		Kyle Lafferty	19	18,429
2018–19	Scottish Premiership	38	15	6	17	42	50	-8	51	6th	Final	Semi-Final	Did not qualify		Steven Naismith	14	18,441
2019–20	Scottish Premiership (Note: 2019–20 Scottish Premiership suspended in March 2020 due to the COVID-19 pandemic in Scotland; season curtailed and final placings decided on points per game following a vote on 18 May 2020.)	30	4	11	15	31	52	-21	23	12th	Final	Semi-Final	Did not qualify		Craig Halkett	7	16,229
2020–21	Scottish Championship	27 (Note: Scottish Championship was shortened to 27 games in June 2020 due to the ongoing COVID-19 pandemic.)	17	6	4	63	24	39	57	1st	Second Round	Second Round	Did not qualify		Liam Boyce	16	None (Note: Attendance restricted due to COVID-19 restrictions.)
2021–22	Scottish Premiership	38	17	10	11	54	44	+10	61	3rd	Final	Second Round	Did not qualify		Liam Boyce	16	16,714
2022–23	Scottish Premiership	38	15	9	14	63	57	+6	54	4th	Quarter-Final	Second Round	UEFA Europa League UEFA Europa Conference League	Play-Off Round Group stage (Group A, 3rd)	Lawrence Shankland	28	18,471
2023–24	Scottish Premiership	38	20	8	10	54	42	+12	68	3rd	Semi-Final	Semi-Final	UEFA Europa Conference League	Play-Off Round	Lawrence Shankland	31	18,406
2024–25	Scottish Premiership	38	15	7	16	52	47	+5	52	7th	Semi-Final	Second Round	UEFA Europa League UEFA Europa Conference League	Play-Off Round League Phase (25th)	Lawrence Shankland	9	18,536
2025–26	Scottish Premiership	38	24	8	6	67	34	+33	80	2nd	Fourth round	Second Round	Did not qualify		Lawrence Shankland	20	18,743
