= 1964–65 Heart of Midlothian F.C. season =

Heart of Midlothian
1964–65 season
- Manager: Tommy Walker
- Stadium: Tynecastle Park
- Scottish First Division: 2nd
- Scottish Cup: Round 3
- League Cup: Group Stage
- Summer Cup: Group Stage

During the 1964–65 season Hearts competed in the Scottish First Division, the Scottish Cup, the Scottish League Cup, the Summer Cup and the East of Scotland Shield.

== Fixtures ==
=== Friendlies ===
19 October 1964 Friendly	Hearts	1–2	Stoke City	Tynecastle Park
	Goal			Attendance: 10,000

8 June 1965 Norwegian Tour	SK Brann	0–2	Hearts	Brann Stadion
	Goal			Attendance: 15,700

10 June 1965 Norwegian Tour	Valerengens IF	1–4	Hearts	Ullevaal Stadion
	Goal			Attendance: 14,300

14 June 1965 Norwegian Tour	Larvik Turn	0–5	Hearts	Lovisenlund
	Goal			Attendance: 10,000

17 June 1965 Norwegian Tour	Nidelv Trondheim	0–3	Hearts	Lerkendal Stadion
	Goal			Attendance: 6,100

19 June 1965 Offside Demonstration	Hearts	8–2	Kilmarnock	Tynecastle Park
	Goal			Attendance: 9,000

=== League Cup ===
8 August 1964 League Cup Group	Kilmarnock	1–1	Hearts	Rugby Park
				Attendance: 8,832

12 August 1964 League Cup Group	Hearts	0–3	Celtic	Tynecastle Park
				Attendance: 18,534

15 August 1964 League Cup Group	Partick Thistle	2–1	Hearts	Firhill Park
				Attendance: 7,433

22 August 1964 League Cup Group	Hearts	0–1	Kilmarnock	Tynecastle Park
				Attendance: 10,391

26 August 1964 League Cup Group	Celtic	6–1	Hearts	Celtic Park
				Attendance: 26,759

29 August 1964 League Cup Group	Hearts	4–3	Partick Thistle	Tynecastle Park
				Attendance: 5,850

=== Scottish Cup ===
6 February 1965 Scottish Cup R1	Falkirk	0–3	Hearts	Tynecastle Park
				Attendance: 12,000

20 February 1965 Scottish Cup R2	Morton	3–3	Hearts	Cappielow Park
				Attendance: 16,560

24 February 1965 Scottish Cup R2 Replay	Hearts	2–0	Morton	Tynecastle Park
				Attendance: 31,996

6 March 1965 Scottish Cup R3	Motherwell	1–0	Hearts	Fir Park
				Attendance: 13,308

=== Summer Cup ===
1 May 1965 Summer Cup Group	Hibernian	3–0	Hearts	Easter Road

5 May 1965 Summer Cup Group	Hearts	2–0	Falkirk	Tynecastle Park

8 May 1965 Summer Cup Group	Dunfermline Athletic	1–2	Hearts	East End Park

12 May 1965 Summer Cup Group	Hearts	2–2	Hibernian	Tynecastle Park

15 May 1965 Summer Cup Group	Falkirk	1–2	Hearts	Brockville Park

19 May 1965 Summer Cup Group	Hearts	2–2	Dunfermline Athletic	Tynecastle Park

=== Scottish First Division ===
19 August 1964 Scottish First Division	Hearts	8–1	Airdrieonians	Tynecastle Park
				Attendance: 6,541

5 September 1964 Scottish First Division	Hibernian	3–5	Hearts	Easter Road
				Attendance: 17,098

12 September 1964 Scottish First Division	Hearts	1–1	Dunfermline Athletic	Tynecastle Park
				Attendance: 14,130

19 September 1964 Scottish First Division	Third Lanark	1–5	Hearts	Cathkin Park
				Attendance: 3,815

26 September 1964 Scottish First Division	Hearts	4–2	Celtic	Tynecastle Park
				Attendance: 24,774

3 October 1964 Scottish First Division	Partick Thistle	1–3	Hearts	Firhill Park
				Attendance: 9,054

10 October 1964 Scottish First Division	Hearts	0–0	St Mirren	Tynecastle Park
				Attendance: 10,631

17 October 1964 Scottish First Division	Hearts	1–1	Rangers	Tynecastle Park
				Attendance: 35,072

24 October 1964 Scottish First Division	Dundee	1–2	Hearts	Tynecastle Park
				Attendance: 14,629

31 October 1964 Scottish First Division	Dundee United	2–2	Hearts	Tannadice Park
				Attendance: 10,218

7 November 1964 Scottish First Division	Falkirk	0–2	Hearts	Tynecastle Park
				Attendance: 7,605

14 November 1964 Scottish First Division	Motherwell	1–3	Hearts	Fir Park
				Attendance: 6,033

21 November 1964 Scottish First Division	Hearts	3–0	Clyde	Tynecastle Park
				Attendance: 11,384

28 November 1964 Scottish First Division	St Johnstone	0–3	Hearts	Muirton Park
				Attendance: 9,467

5 December 1964 Scottish First Division	Hearts	3–1	Dundee United	Tynecastle Park
				Attendance: 10,063

12 December 1964 Scottish First Division	Hearts	6–3	Aberdeen	Tynecastle Park
				Attendance: 12,117

19 December 1964 Scottish First Division	Kilmarnock	3–1	Hearts	Rugby Park
				Attendance: 18,285

26 December 1964 Scottish First Division	Airdrieonians	1–2	Hearts	Broomfield Park
				Attendance: 4,045

1 January 1965 Scottish First Division	Hearts	0–1	Hibernian	Tynecastle Park
				Attendance: 36,297

2 January 1965 Scottish First Division	Dunfermline Athletic	3–2	Hearts	East End Park
				Attendance: 18,848

9 January 1965 Scottish First Division	Hearts	3–1	Third Lanark	Tynecastle Park
				Attendance: 10,770

16 January 1965 Scottish First Division	Celtic	1–2	Hearts	Celtic Park
				Attendance: 19,800

23 January 1965 Scottish First Division	Hearts	1–0	Partick Thistle	Tynecastle Park
				Attendance: 14,620

30 January 1965 Scottish First Division	St Mirren	2–1	Hearts	St Mirren Park, Love Street
				Attendance: 6,929

13 February 1965 Scottish First Division	Rangers	1–1	Hearts	Ibrox Park
				Attendance: 51,272

27 February 1965 Scottish First Division	Hearts	1–7	Dundee	Tynecastle Park
				Attendance: 13,393

10 March 1965 Scottish First Division	Morton	2–3	Hearts	Cappielow Park
				Attendance: 9,428

13 March 1965 Scottish First Division	Hearts	5–2	Falkirk	Tynecastle Park
				Attendance: 10,019

20 March 1965 Scottish First Division	Hearts	2–0	Motherwell	Tynecastle Park
				Attendance: 5,026

27 March 1965 Scottish First Division	Clyde	2–5	Hearts	Shawfield Stadium
				Attendance: 4,088

3 April 1965 Scottish First Division	Hearts	4–1	St Johnstone	Tynecastle Park
				Attendance: 11,328

10 April 1965 Scottish First Division	Dundee United	1–1	Hearts	Tannadice Park
				Attendance: 12,414

17 April 1965 Scottish First Division	Aberdeen	0–3	Hearts	Pittodrie Park
				Attendance: 15,540

24 April 1965 Scottish First Division	Hearts	0–2	Kilmarnock	Tynecastle Park
				Attendance: 37,275

== See also ==
- List of Heart of Midlothian F.C. seasons
