= Edina F.C. =

Association football club in Scotland

Edina
- Full name: Edina Football Club
- Founded: 1877
- Dissolved: 1887
- Ground: Craigmillar Park
- Match Secretary: John M. Forbes, William Taylor
- Hon. Secretary: Wm. Love, Charles Goodwin
Home colours

Edina Football Club was a football club from the city of Edinburgh.

== History ==
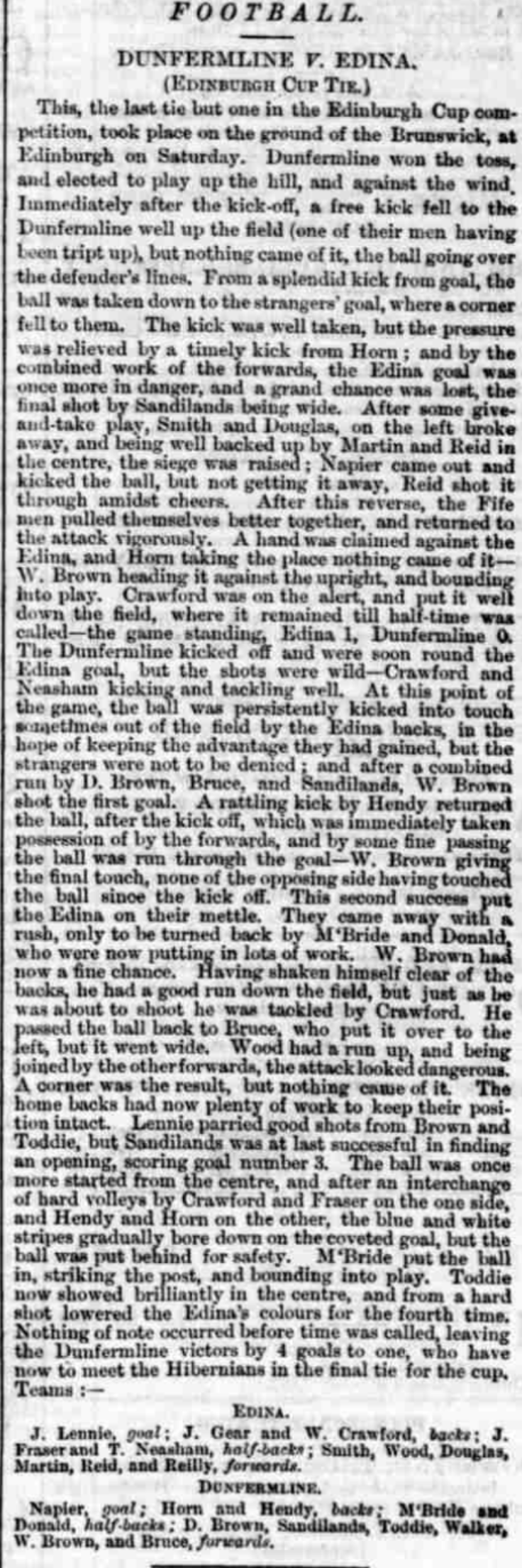
1879–80 Edinburgh Cup semi-final report, Dunfermline Saturday Press, 7 February 1880

The club was formed in 1877 and turned senior in 1883 by joining the Scottish Football Association, although with 50 members it was some way behind the more established clubs in the city.

Its first competitive football came in the Edinburgh Cup in 1878–79, with a first round defeat to Hanover on the East Meadows. However, in 1879–80 the club had its best run in the competition, reaching the semi-final, the tie against Dunfermline taking place at the Brunswick ground. Edina took a half-time lead, but conceded two goals within a minute of each other in the second half, and ultimately went down 4–1.

Edina's first competitive match as a senior club was in the 1883–84 Scottish Cup first round, against Kinleith at home, and ostensibly won the tie, but Kinleith protested on "several" grounds, the most prominent one being that the referee was a member of the Edina. During what appears to have been a fractious debate, at one point it was mooted that both clubs be thrown out of the competition, before the Scottish FA ordered a replay, with an allowance of half-an-hour for extra time. In the replay at Mayfield, Edina did not need the extra time, winning 4–0; the task was made considerably easier by Kinleith only turning up with 9 men.

The tie was Edina's only Scottish Cup win; it had already been left behind by Hibernian, Heart of Midlothian, and St Bernards, all of whom racked up big scores against Edina in the Scottish Cup. Edina even struggled in the Edinburgh Shield, losing to junior clubs, and going down 2–0 to a reserve Hibernian in 1885–86 when the Hibs first team was playing Hearts. The club's final match in the competition was a 5–2 defeat against the minnows of Royal Oak in the first round of the consolation competition the same season.

By 1886, Edina had just 32 members, which made it the smallest senior club in the city. After another humiliating defeat, in the 1886–87 Scottish Cup (7–1 to Hearts, Gibson scoring a late consolation), the club scratched from the Edinburgh Shield, and was struck off the Scottish FA's register at the end of the season.

== Colours ==
The club played in blue and black jerseys and hose, with white knickers.

== Ground ==
The club originally played at Craigmillar Park. In 1885 it moved to the Royal Gymnasium.
