= Swifts F.C. (Edinburgh) =

Association football club in Scotland

Swifts
- Full name: Edinburgh Swifts
- Founded: 1876
- Dissolved: 1880
- Ground: Roseburn Park
- Secretary: Francis G. Watt
Home colours

Swifts Football Club, also known as Edinburgh Swifts, was a football club from the city of Edinburgh.

== History ==
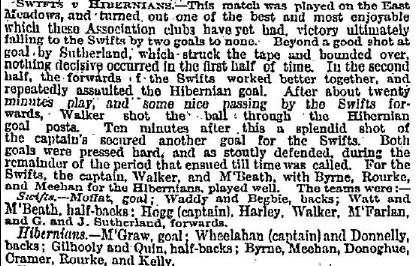
The Swifts' first fixture against Hibernian, Scotsman, 6 November 1876

The club was formed as a split from the 3rd Edinburgh Rifle Volunteers F.C. towards the end of the 1875–76 season. At least seven of the club's early players, including the 3rd E.R.V. club secretary (and half-back) Frank Watt, who took up the same role with the Swifts, left the Volunteers to form the Swifts.

The split may have been caused by different views on inclusivity. The 3rd E.R.V. had close links with Councillor John Hope, who had founded the Foot-Ball Club of Edinburgh in 1824, and who had formed a Volunteer regiment which had merged with the 3rd in 1867. Hope's trenchant opposition to Roman Catholicism had seen Hibernian F.C. excluded from the Edinburgh Football Association., Watt was of a different view, and had agitated for including Hibernian within the football fraternity.

The Swifts' first reported match was a 1–0 defeat on the Meadows to Heart of Midlothian F.C. in April 1876. It entered both the Scottish Cup and Edinburgh Cup in 1876–77; in the latter, the club suffered an acrimonious semi-final defeat against the 3rd E.R.V., having to play a replay with ten men, after the original match had been played on a pitch that had been marked out to the wrong dimensions.

Its 1876–77 Scottish Cup run was more fruitful, with the club reaching the fourth round (made up of 12 clubs) for the only time, helped by the disqualification of West End of Glasgow from the third round after the clubs had drawn 1–1 in Cowlairs. The club was drawn to play at home to Lennox F.C., who had only conceded 2 goals all season. Despite having to play the second half with ten men through injury, Lennox won 4–0, with two goals per half; full-back Kennedy - whose corner led to the first goal - was particularly praised for his play.

In the first round of the 1877–78 Scottish Cup, the Swifts gained revenge over the 3rd E.R.V., winning 2–1 in a replay; the Volunteers protested that they had claimed a goal for a shot that clipped the tape, the referee ruling that the ball had then gone over, but the protest was dismissed.

By the end of the decade however the growth in football had left the club behind. Its last game in the Edinburgh Cup was in 1878–79, a 2–1 defeat to Edinburgh Thistle F.C. in the first round, with the Swifts disputing both Thistle goals and the game "ending in an angry squabble". It withdrew from its last entry in the Edinburgh Cup in 1879–80 and lost 5–0 at Brunswick F.C. in its last Scottish Cup tie in the same season, the Swifts side still being substantially the same players who had founded the club three years before. The club may have played low-level football for a few years afterwards, but there is no further record of the Swifts as a senior club.

== Colours ==
The club played in dark blue shirts with a white Maltese cross, white knickers, and red hose.

== Ground ==
The club originally played on a public park, i.e. the East Meadows. For the start of the 1876–77 season the club had secured a ground at Roseburn Park. By 1878 the club was playing at Powburn.
