= George Scott (footballer, born 1865) =

Scottish association football player

Geordie Scott
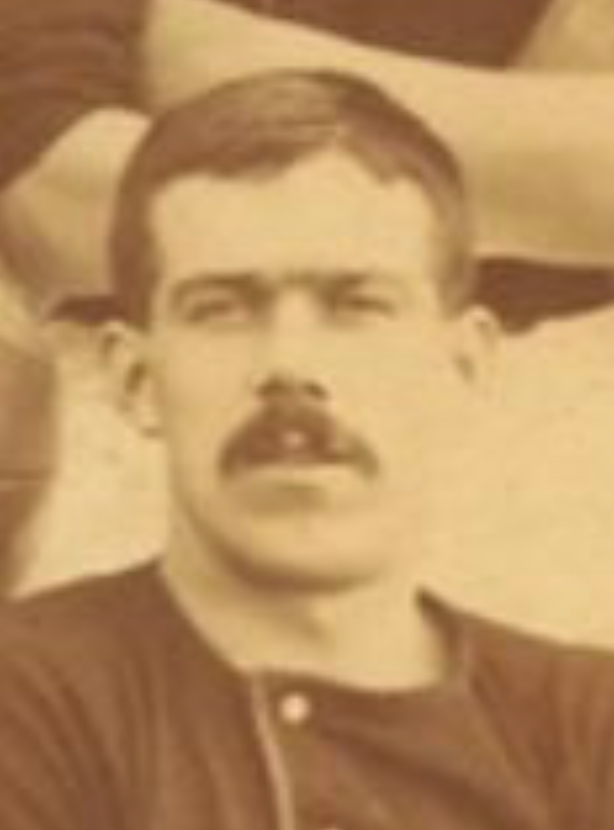
- Photograph of George Scott

Personal information
- Full name: George Archibald Scott
- Date of birth: 20 November 1865
- Place of birth: Scoonie, Scotland
- Date of death: 14 January 1937 (aged 71)
- Place of death: Bishopbriggs, Scotland
- Position: Inside left

Youth career
- Towerhill
- Northern

Senior career*
Years	Team	Apps	(Gls)
1882–1889	Cowlairs		
1889–1897	Hearts	222	(95)
1897	Kilmarnock		(?)
- * Club domestic league appearances and goals

George Archibald "Geordie" Scott (20 November 1865 – 14 January 1937) was a Scottish footballer. He is best known for his time at Hearts, from 1889 until 1897, helping them to victory in the 1890–91 Scottish Cup and 1894/95 league title. He was also a long-standing member and president of Bishopbriggs Bowling Club.

== Life and playing career ==
Born in Scoonie, Scott moved with his family to Glasgow at a young age and found work with Cowlairs Railway Works. Initially playing for local sides Towerhill and Northern, Scott was signed by Cowlairs in 1882, before moving to Hearts in 1889. On joining the club, professionalism in Scottish football remained theoretically illegal, and "almost without exception, the players were working at a trade they had." Nevertheless, Hearts had begun to offer their team unofficial compensation, and "it is related [of Scott] that at one time when the treasury was low he offered, of his own accord, to accept less money," while continuing to play. In his early cup-ties, Scott "was always famous for his grit." During his tenure, Hearts won two Scottish Cups and came top of the League in 1894/95. In the 1890/91 and 1892/93 Seasons, Scott was top goal scorer for Hearts. By 1897, Scott was one of the oldest players in the League, along with James Kelly. "One of the marvels" of the Hearts side, Geordie Scott still appeared "endowed with all his old vigour and cleverness [...] and should the first eleven require a change on the left wing the Hearts would do worse than try the old Towerhill player." That year, Scott was briefly loaned to Kilmarnock to play in the Cup Quarter Final against Third Lanark. Following this, Scott formally retired from football, but came back to play in a 1902 charity match between Cowlairs and Northern for the Ibrox Fund.

He was nicknamed 'Great Scott.'

In 1930, John MacCartney recalled the 1890 Cup winners, and related what had become of them since. Of Geordie Scott, he said: "A man of position in his native Glasgow. A tremendously strong forcing player and a splendid shot. He very effectively supported internationalist Bobby Calderwood in Cowlairs team ere migrating to Edinburgh, where he kept the impetuous Davie Baird on the move."

Following the end his football career, Scott carried on at the Cowlairs Railway Works, retiring in 1930 after fifty years' service and having attained the position of chief boilermaker foreman. Scott remained an active member, and president, of the Bishopbriggs Bowling Club.

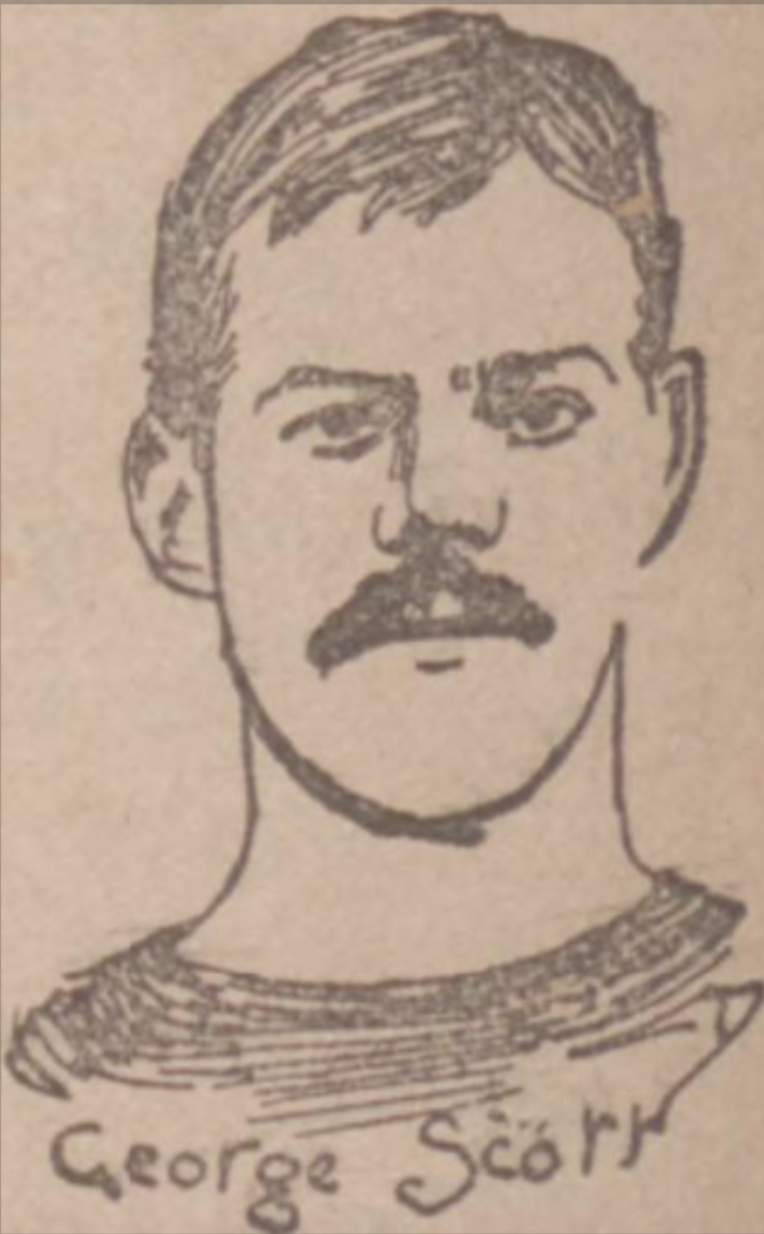
Sketch of George Scott from Scottish Referee

== Honours ==
=== Club ===
Hearts

- 1890–91 Scottish Cup
- 1894–95 Scottish Division One
- 1895–96 Scottish Cup

In August 2013, Scott's 1894/95 Scottish Football League Championship Winners' medal, worth between £1,250 and £1,500, was one of five artefacts stolen from a display case at Tynecastle.

== Gallery ==
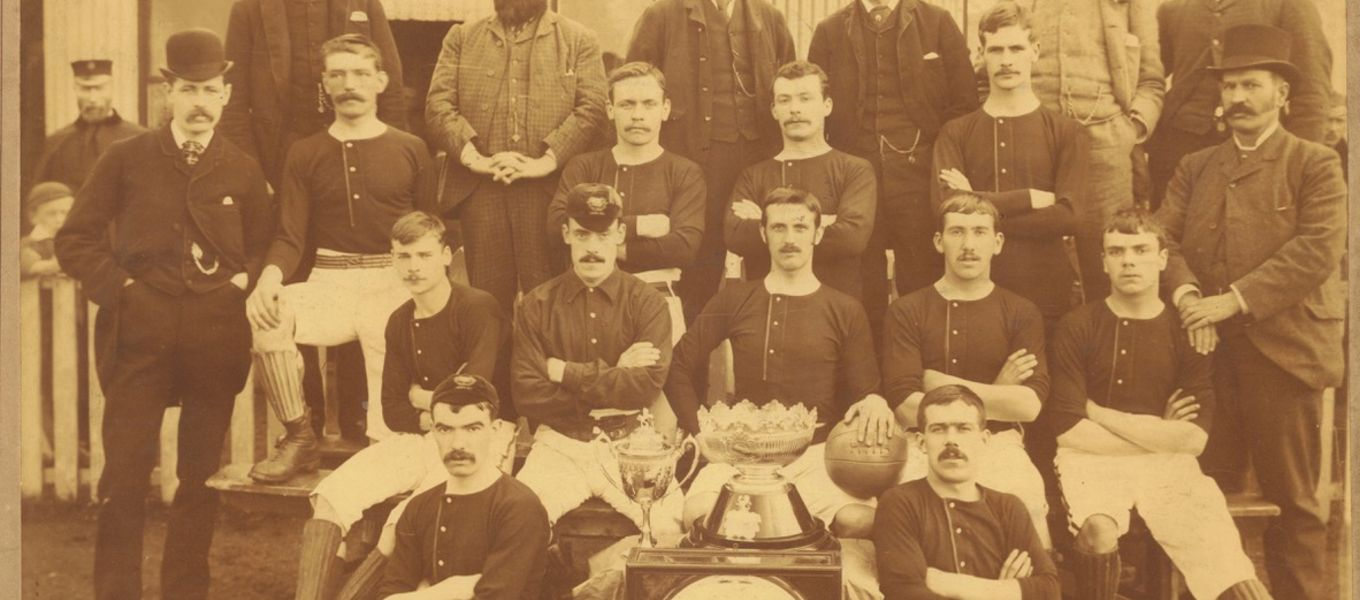
George Scott front right

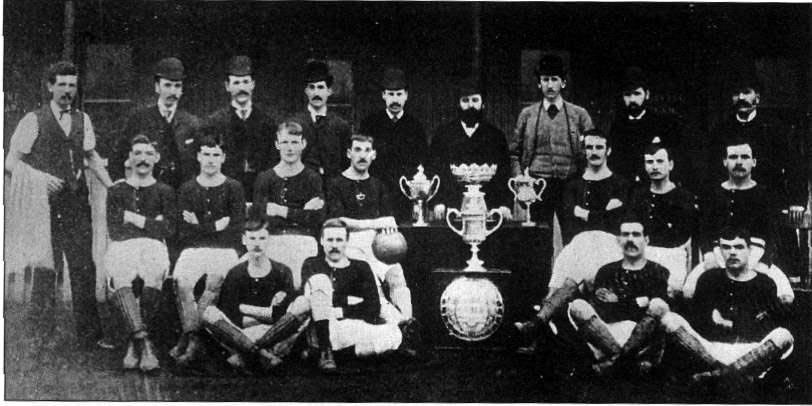
George Scott front row, second from right

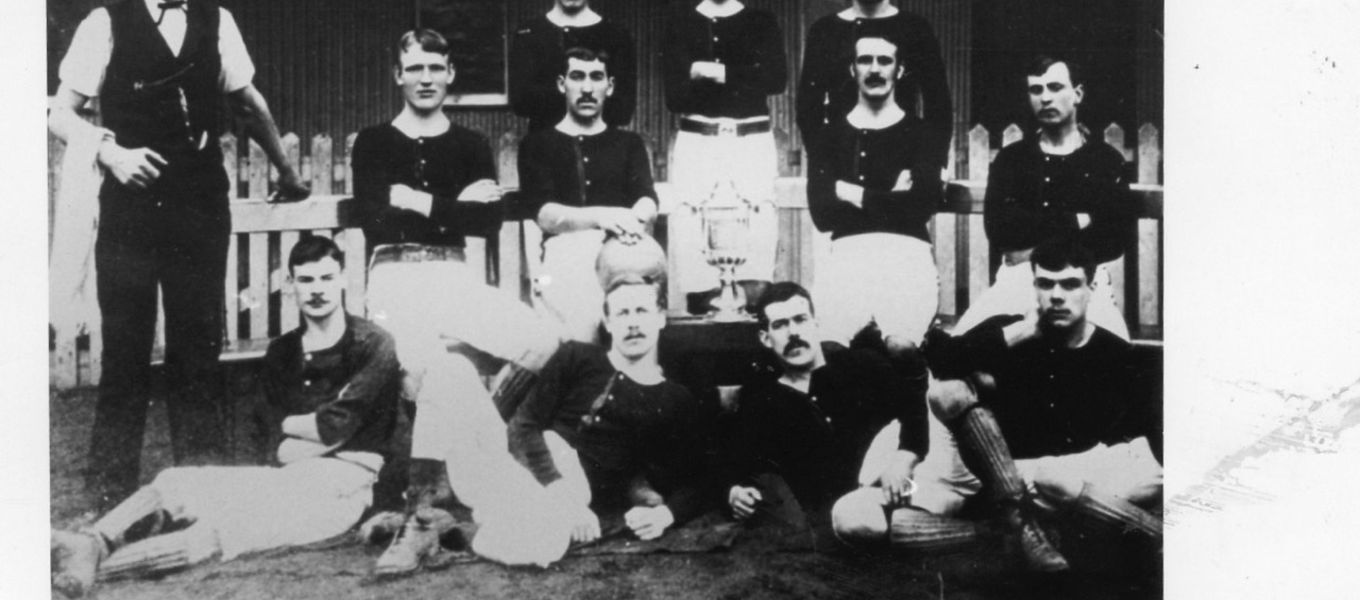
George Scott front row, second from right

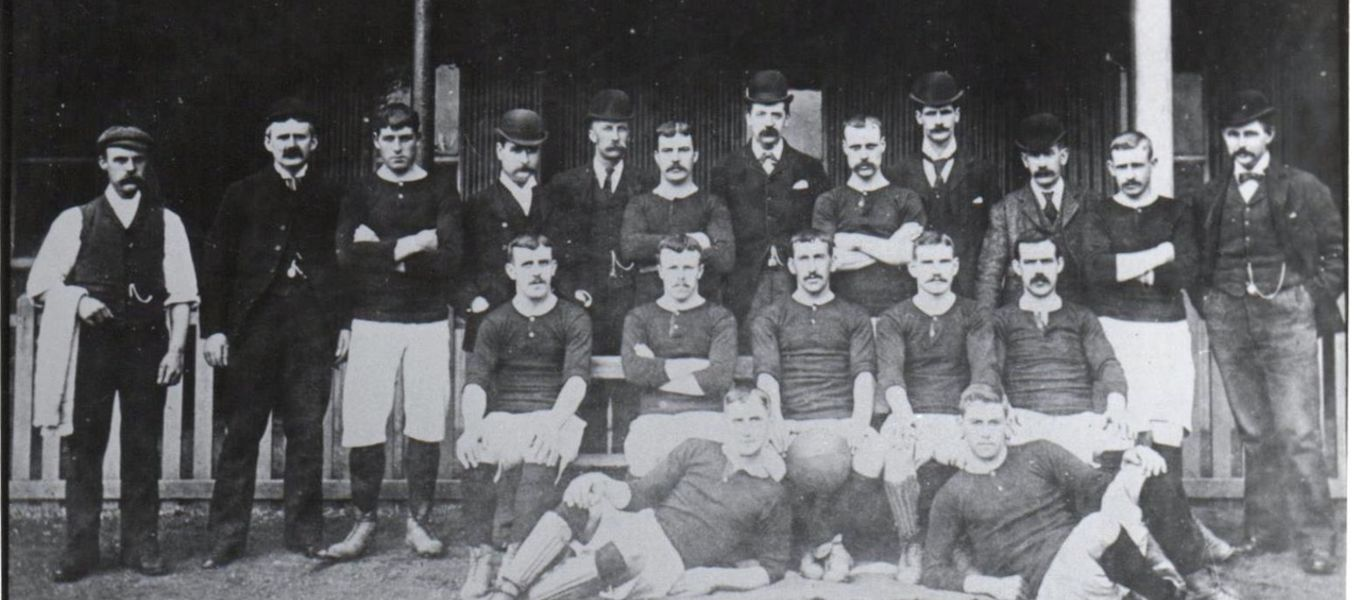
George Scott middle row, right
