= Hearts of Liddesdale F.C. =

Hearts of Liddesdale
- Full name: Hearts of Liddesdale Football Club
- Founded: 1880
- Dissolved: 2021
- Ground: Liddel View Park
Newcastleton colours	Hearts of Liddesdale colours

Hearts of Liddesdale Football Club was a football club based in Newcastleton, in the Scottish Borders.

== History ==
=== Newcastleton F.C. ===
The club was founded in 1880 as Newcastleton. The club quickly gathered 50 members and, thanks to the training of William M'Kinnon of Dumbarton, who worked in the district as a schoolmaster, was dominant on the small local football scene; between 1882 and 1885 it played 19 matches, winning 17 and losing 2.

In August 1883 the club joined the Scottish Football Association, and entered the 1883–84 Scottish Cup. Without an obvious region to join, the club was given a bye to the second round, and drawn at home to Heart of Midlothian. The remoteness of the club meant that Hearts arranged for the 10.30am mail train from Edinburgh to stop at the village and, to make a 1.30pm kick-off, they went straight from the station to the ground to kick off. Hearts won 4–1 in a heavy wind, but the Hearts were disappointed to have travelled 150 miles and not be offered refreshments.

In the 1884-85 Scottish Cup, the club travelled outside the Borders area for the first time, and received a rude awakening, beaten 10–2 by the second-rank Dunfermline, in front of a crowd of 2,000. Newcastleton's remoteness worked for and against it; drawn away at West Calder in the 1885–86 Scottish Cup, Newcastleton withdrew, but, conversely, the following season, drawn at home to the Edinburgh side Norton Park, Newcastleton walked over into the second round, Park not being able to make the same arrangements as Hearts had. In the second round, Newcastleton lost 5–1 at home to Armadale, the visitors being 7/6 out of pocket as the gate only amounted to 14/2, suggesting a paying audience of 12.

The club's last Scottish Cup tie was a first round defeat at Moffat in 1887–88. The club did not pay its subscription for 1888–89 and left the Scottish FA. Newcastleton however continued, playing Junior football.

=== Hearts of Liddesdale F.C. ===
At the end of the 1909–10 season, the club changed its name to Hearts of Liddesdale. The club continued playing Junior football until 1927, when it took a step both back to amateur football and south to English football by joining the Carlisle and District League.

In 1949, the club applied to enter the FA Amateur Cup, and the FA accepted the club's entry. The club continued playing in English competitions via its affiliation to the Cumberland FA and was runner-up in the Cumberland Senior Cup in 1975–76.

The club continued to enter the Cumberland Senior Cup until 2009–10, when it switched affiliation back to Scotland. In 2010–11, the club joined the Border Amateur Football Association league, but after twice finishing runner-up in the C Division, faced an unusual problem due to its geography - many of its players were from the English side of the border, and were not allowed to play football in England as well; this seems to have led to the club's disbanding in 2015. The club tried to make a comeback in 2021, but it does not seem to have been able to raise a team.

== Colours ==
As Newcastleton, the club wore blue jerseys and white knickers. As Hearts of Liddesdale, the club wore maroon.

== Grounds ==
The club originally had private grounds near the Grapes Hotel in Newcastleton. The club's ground as Hearts of Liddesdale was Liddel View Park.
