= Percy Dawson (footballer) =

English footballer

Personal information
- Full name: Percival Hall Dawson
- Date of birth: 4 December 1889
- Place of birth: Cullercoats, England
- Date of death: 1974 (aged 74–75)
- Height: 5 ft 11 1/2 in (1.82 m)
- Position: Centre forward

Senior career*
| Years | Team | Apps | (Gls) |
- Whitley Athletic
- North Shields
| 1911–1914 | Heart of Midlothian | 80 | (63) |
| 1914–1922 | Blackburn Rovers | 140 | (71) |
| 1923 | Barrow | 4 | (0) |
| Total | | 224 | (134) |

International career
| 1916 | Scotland (wartime) | 1 | (0) |
- * Club domestic league appearances and goals

Percival Hall Dawson (born 4 December 1889 – 1974) was an English footballer who played as a centre forward. He played in the Scottish Football League for Heart of Midlothian and in the English Football League for Blackburn Rovers, moving between them in 1914 for what is believed to be a record transfer fee at the time.

== Career ==
Dawson was born in Cullercoats. Early on in his football career, he played for non-league sides Whitley Athletic and North Shields before moving to Scottish club Heart of Midlothian in 1911. In 1913, however, Hearts were required to sell Dawson in order to fund improvements to their Tynecastle Stadium, and he was transferred to Blackburn Rovers for a fee of £2,500 – a fee which several sources claim was a then world record transfer fee.

In his first season with Blackburn, he contributed to the club winning the English First Division, and helped them to a third-place finish the following season.

The outbreak of World War I brought about an end to professional football in England for four seasons. After serving as a sergeant in the Royal Garrison Artillery during the war, Dawson returned to Blackburn and remained with the club until 1922. He played four matches for Barrow in 1923 before retiring from football.
