= 3rd Edinburgh Rifle Volunteers F.C. =

Association football club in Scotland

3rd E.R.V.
- Full name: 3rd Edinburgh Rifle Volunteers Football Club
- Nickname: the Volunteers
- Founded: 1874
- Dissolved: 1879
- Ground: East Meadows
- Secretary: Francis G. Watt
- Captain: A. W. Lamont
Home colours

3rd Edinburgh Rifle Volunteers Football Club was a football club from the city of Edinburgh. The club was the first winner of the East of Scotland Shield, under its original title of the Edinburgh Association Cup, but had ceased playing by 1880.

== History ==
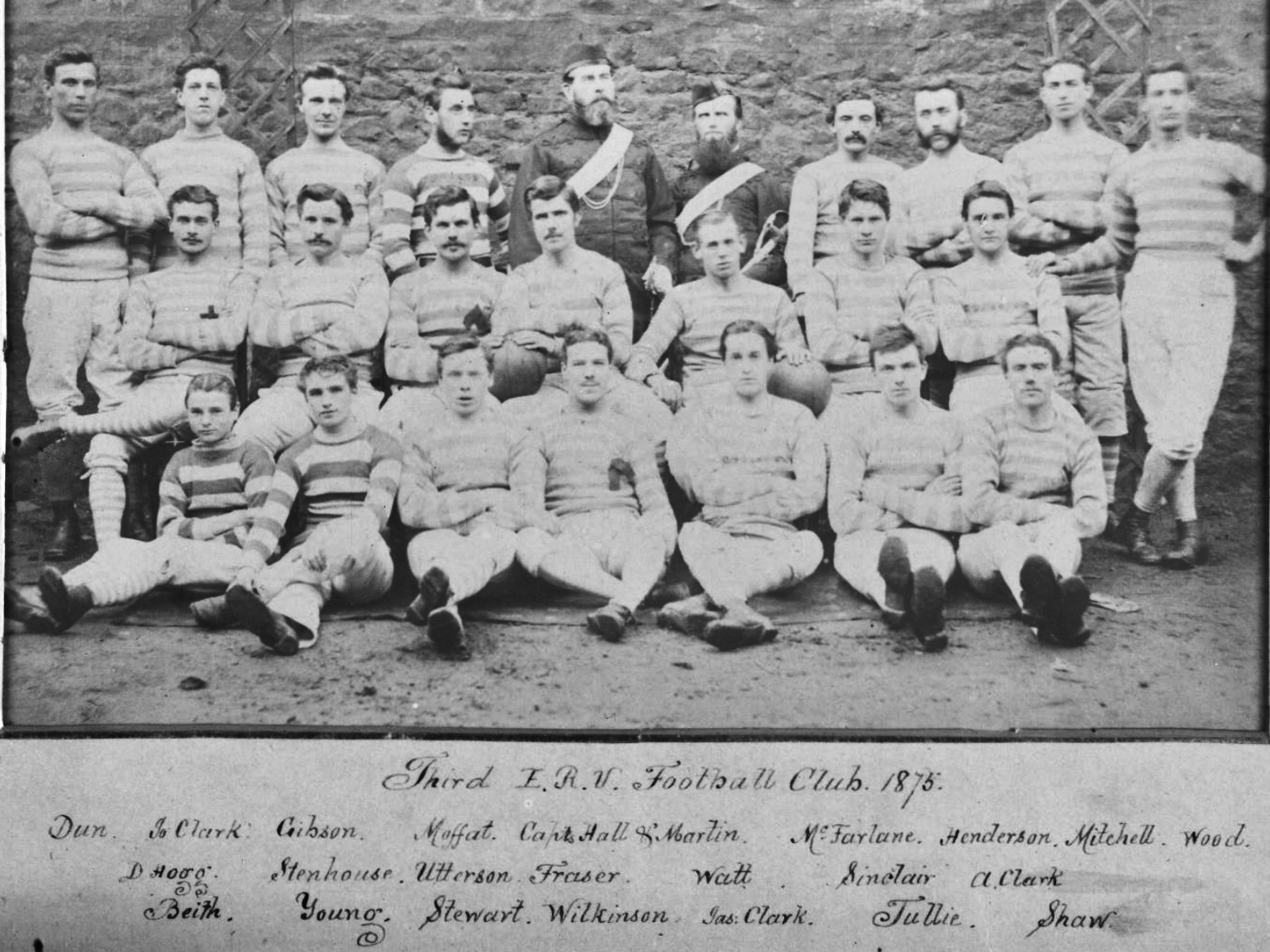
The 3rd Edinburgh Rifle Volunteers Football Club, 1875–76

=== Rifle Volunteer movement ===
The club was formed out of the 3rd Edinburgh Rifle Volunteers, a company in the Volunteer movement of the British Army. The Volunteers included sporting activities within their purview and newspapers often carried reports of such activities. The growth of football in Scotland, especially thanks to Queen's Park F.C., and the success of army teams in England such as the Royal Engineers A.F.C., encouraged regiments to form football clubs as part of the physical regimen.

=== Foundation ===
The 3rd E.R.V. regiment was augmented in 1867 with the addition of a regiment raised by John Hope, who had founded the Foot-Ball Club of Edinburgh in 1824. It was therefore logical that the Volunteers would form a football side, and it did so in 1874, adopting the Football Association laws.

At the time there was one other club in the city, namely the Edinburgh Thistle club. Unlike Thistle, the Volunteers entered the Scottish Cup in 1874–75, losing to Helensburgh 3–0 in the first round, the tie being played at neutral ground in Glasgow. The earliest recorded match for the Volunteers had been at Craigmount grounds in Grange the previous week, a defeat to the Rovers club of Glasgow.

=== Edinburgh Association ===
The club was one of the four founding members of the Edinburgh Football Association, formed in September 1875, with the Thistle, Heart of Midlothian, and Hanover. All except Hanover entered the Scottish Cup in 1875–76. At the time, the earliest rounds were played on a regional basis, and Hearts and the Volunteers were drawn to play each other, the winners to face Thistle in the second round of fixtures. The Scottish FA's scheme did not come to fruition as the Volunteers and Hearts drew 0–0 twice, so were both put through into the second round; the Hearts were sent to play Drumpellier and 3rd E.R.V. played Thistle, winning 1–0 in a tie replayed after the original game was abandoned through rain. In the third round (the final 14) the club lost 4–0 at Rovers, the final goal being an own goal, with a Volunteer heading home a Peden corner.

The same season saw the first Edinburgh Football Association cup, the first regional knockout tournament in Scotland. All four members of the Edinburgh FA entered. The Volunteers beat Hanover in its semi-final tie and swept Thistle aside in the final 6–0. Notably, the Hibernian club, as an "Irish" club, was not included in the Edinburgh Association, because of opposition from the staunchly Protestant Hope.

=== Split ===
Towards the end of the 1875–76 season, the club saw a split, with at least seven of its key players forming the new club Edinburgh Swifts, including club secretary (and half-back) Frank Watt. It is not clear why there was a split, but two relevant factors may be the Volunteers' refusal to play the Hibernian, and a wish to accept players who were not members of the Volunteer force, which the Swifts proceeded to do. Certainly Watt had agitated for including Hibernian within the football fraternity.

The effect on the club was devastating. It lost in the first round of the Scottish Cup in 1876–77 to St Clement's of Dundee, a club making its competition debut, at neutral ground in Kirkcaldy; and, after an acrimonious semi-final win in the Edinburgh Cup against a ten-man Swifts, which had to be re-played after the original match had been played on a pitch that had been marked out to the wrong dimensions, the Volunteers did not turn up to Meadows for the final against Thistle, "much to the disappointment of a large concourse of spectators".

The club lost to the Swifts in the first round of the 1877–78 Scottish Cup, 2–1 in a replay; the Volunteers protested that they had claimed a goal for a shot that clipped the tape, the referee ruling that the ball had then gone over, but the protest was dismissed. The Volunteers did not enter the Edinburgh Cup, by which time Hibernian had joined the Edinburgh Association and ended up reaching the final.

=== End of the club ===
In 1878–79 the 3rd E.R.V. again eschewed the Edinburgh Cup, focussing on the Scottish, and after beating Brunswick in the first round at Powburn, was drawn to play Hibernian. After 30 minutes, with the Volunteers 3–0 down, and down to 9 men, as Hume had left the pitch "coughing blood" and Shaw had been lamed, the club forfeited the tie.

The club did enter the Scottish Cup the following season but scratched; indeed the Hibernian tie is the last recorded match for the club. Although it has since been claimed that the Volunteers effectively became St Bernard's, the Saints had existed (originally as a rugby union club) since at least 1876, and only one Volunteer (Dunn) appears to have played for St Bernard's; most of the key players either did not play for any of the major Edinburgh sides, or had already joined the Swifts.

== Colours ==
The club played in blue and white hooped shirts and stockings, with white knickerbockers and (originally) blue caps.

== Ground ==
The club originally gave its ground as being at the East Meadows. It also played key matches at Craigmount. Before the start of the 1877–78 season, the club secured "one of the best grounds in the district" at Powburn.
