= Foot-Ball Club =

- Full name: Foot-Ball Club
- Founded: 1824; 202 years ago
- Dissolved: c. 1841; 185 years ago
- Ground: Dalry Park (1824–31); Greenhill Park (1831–41)

The Foot-Ball Club was a football club in Edinburgh, Scotland, formed in 1824. The club met in the summer months to play a form of football which involved picking up the ball. Nevertheless, the organisation can claim to be the earliest recorded club with football in its name. A modern association football club with the same name was formed in 2007, in an attempt to revive the legacy of the old club.

== History ==
The Foot-Ball Club of Edinburgh is thought to be the first recorded football club in the world with records going back to 1824. Membership lists and accounts of the club between 1824 and 1841 are held in the National Archives of Scotland (NAS).

Founded by John Hope in 1824, the club played its games in the city's Dalry Park until 1831, when they moved to Greenhill Park. The club appears to have met and played every summer, but there is no record of it after 1841. The game the club played included running with ball in hand, kicking the ball, full bodily tackling, and scrums.

In 2017, a brief set of handwritten rules was found on the back of the club's 1833 budget statement. This has been described as the earliest known written rules of a form of football although the rules allowed the ball to be handled which was standard in Scotland until the 1870's and The Gymnastic Society was described as playing 'foot-ball' in the 1780's.

The rules stated:

1. Single soled shoes, no iron
2. No tripping
3. Ball to pass imaginary line
4. A free kick if ball out of bounds
5. Pushing is allowed. Holding not illegal
6. Allow the ball to be lifted between fields

=== Reformation ===
In 2007, an association football club with the same name was formed by Kenny Cameron, a community coach at Spartans, after a tour of the Scottish Football Museum. The club's men played in the Edinburgh Sunday Premier League and the women played in the Scottish Women's Football League Second Division South East Division.

== Sources ==
- 1824: The World's First Foot-Ball Club, John Hutchinson and Andy Mitchell. Andy Mitchell Media, 2018. ISBN 978-1-9866-1244-9.
