= Dunfermline F.C. (1874) =

Former association football club in Scotland

Dunfermline
- Full name: Dunfermline Football Club
- Nickname(s): the Fifers
- Founded: 1874
- Dissolved: 1891
- Ground: Lady's Mill Park
Senior colours	Junior colours

Dunfermline Football Club was an association football club from Dunfermline in Scotland. The club entered the Scottish Cup every season from 1876–77 to 1889–90. However the club only won 3 ties, plus one after which it was disqualified; on 7 occasions the club scratched before playing a match.

== History ==
The club was formed in 1874 as a way for members of the Dunfermline Cricket Club to keep fit over the winter, after cricket club member David Brown saw a Queen's Park match in Glasgow and bought a football to take home.

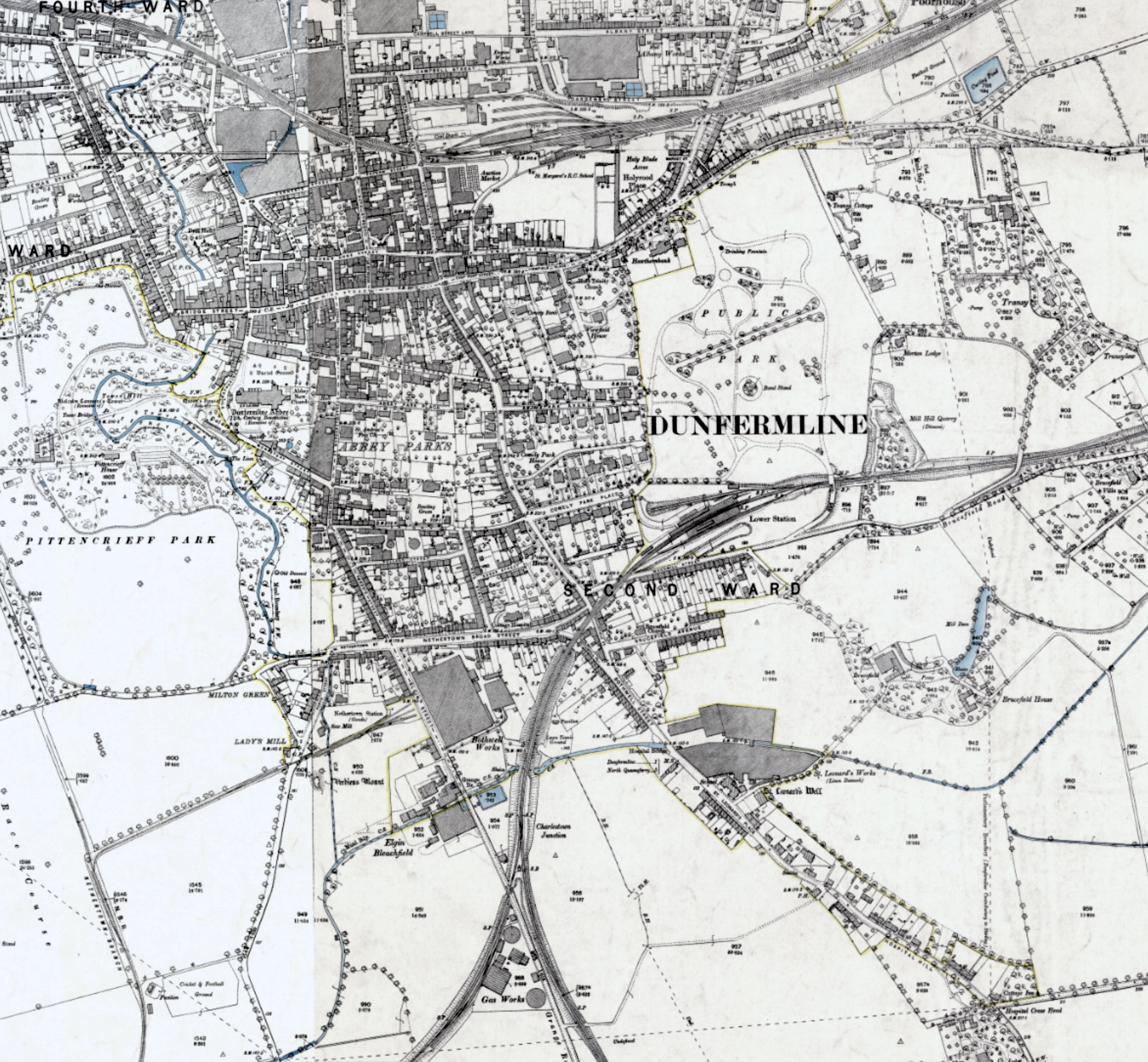
Dunfermline from the Ordnance Survey 25 inch map, 1892, showing Dunfermline FC's Ladymill Park football and cricket ground (bottom left) and Dunfermline Athletic FC's East End Park football ground (top right, next to the curling lake)

As one of the first clubs in the east of Scotland, the club in its early days found it difficult to find opponents, but before the 1876–77 season it was admitted to the Edinburgh Football Association, entitling it to take part in the Edinburgh FA Cup; this was welcome to the local sides as the Heart of Midlothian had just "broken up". The club's first entry to the Scottish Cup saw it placed in the Edinburgh geographical grouping in the first round and gain a walkover, as the temporarily-defunct Hearts had already entered and the clubs were drawn together. Dunfermline lost at Hamilton F.C. in the second round. The club did not win a tie until 1879–80, when it beat Edinburgh Thistle.

The club had a little more success in the Edinburgh Cup, a competition it entered until 1883–84. Its best run came in 1879–80, when three wins took Dunfermline into the final, against Hibernian at Powderhall on 6 March in front of a crowd of over 2,000. Dunfermline had a strong wind behind the side in the first half, but the scores were level at 3–3 at half-time; in the second half the local side scored 3 unanswered goals. Perhaps because of the weather, the match was "declared undecided", and a re-play held at the same venue a fortnight later. This time Hibernian dominated from start to finish and won 5–0. Notably the crowd had almost doubled for the second match.

In 1884–85, the club reached the third round of the national cup for the only time. In the first round, Dunfermline gained its biggest Cup win, 10–2 over Newcastleton, in front of a crowd of 2,000. In the second round, the club was drawn at home to Heart of Midlothian, and took a surprise lead from the kick-off. Hearts replied with 11 unanswered goals. However Dunfermline protested that two of the Hearts players (Chris M'Nee and James Maxwell) were professionals and, "after careful consideration", the protest was upheld; the players were receiving 26 shillings per week. In the third round, the club lost 7–1 at Wishaw Swifts, having been outclassed all match and scoring a consolation via the one chance the club had.

The club had more success on a local level. It was a founder member of the Fifeshire Football Association in 1882 and in David Brown provided the first President. It also won the first Fifeshire Cup in 1882–83, beating Cowdenbeath 4–1 in the final after two ties against minor clubs. The club repeated the feat in 1883–84, beating Alloa Athletic in the final at home in front of a crowd of 3,000, thanks to a goal in each half; Toddie opened the scoring by turning home a cross from D. Brown, and with 20 minutes to go, Toddie turned provider, crossing for W. Brown to head home. Dunfermline was runner-up to Cowdenbeath in 1884–85; in the first round, Dunfermline beat St Leonards 22–0, a record score for the competition.

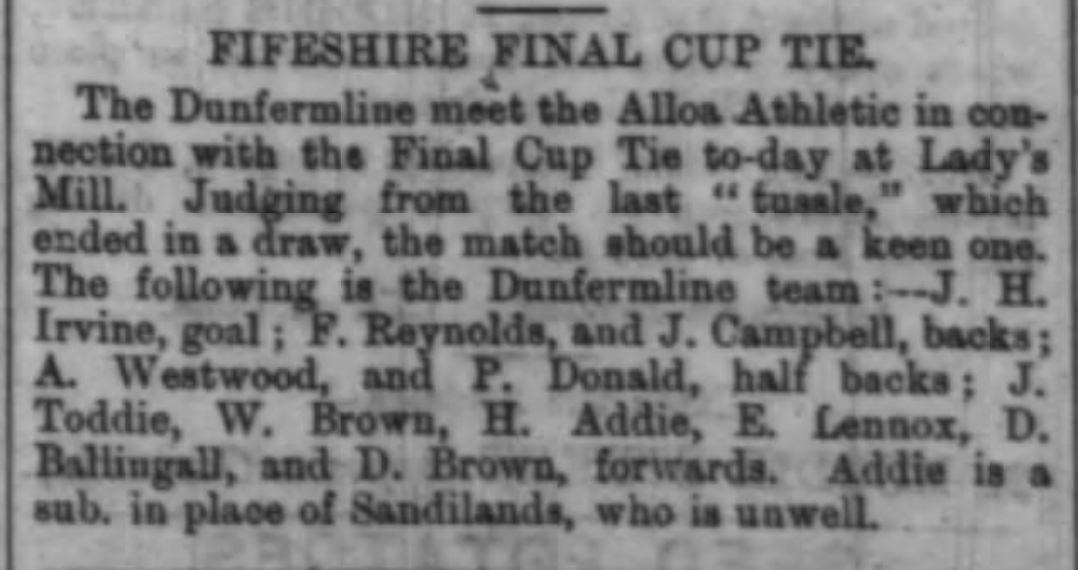
The Dunfermline side to face Alloa Athletic in the 1883–84 Fifeshire Cup final replay, Dunfermline Journal, 5 April 1884

In April 1885, over a dispute as to whether the club should allow non-cricketers to play for the football side, the best football players, including Bob Sandilands and Jim Toddie, broke away to form Dunfermline Athletic. The split worked in favour of the new club; the only competitive match between the two, in the Fifeshire Cup in 1886, ended 6–0 to the Athletic.

Although Dunfermline continued to enter the Scottish Cup until 1889–90, it only played one more tie, scratching on four occasions (twice to the Athletic) and being disqualified after beating Lassodie in 1887–88, on the basis that the secretary had sent in the list of registered players after the deadline. Dunfermline also never won another Fifeshire Cup tie and stopped entering after 1890–91.

=== Junior football ===
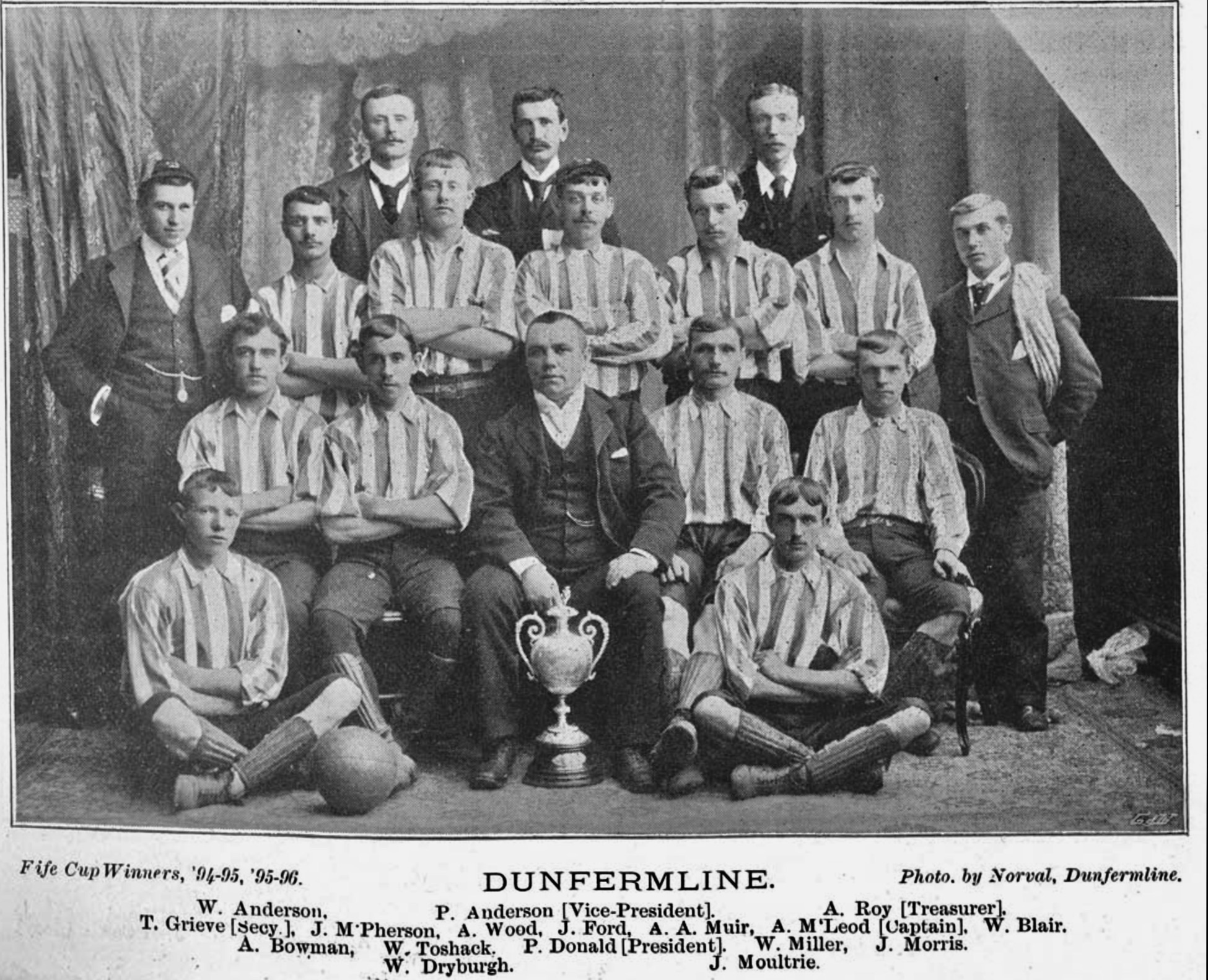
Dunfermline Juniors with the Fife Junior Cup they won in 1896

With Dunfermline Athletic having taken over as the top club, Dunfermline abandoned senior football from the 1891–92 season. The club essentially merged with South-side Athletic, which moved to Ladysmill and changed its name to Dunfermline Juniors, and joined the Scottish Junior Football Association.

The Juniors still retained the links with the cricket club, and was still on occasion referred to as Dunfermline; indeed the "Juniors" were occasionally called up to play for the Athletic.

The Juniors played in the East of Scotland Junior League and win the Fife Junior Cup in 1895 and 1896. Their finest achievement was reaching the final of the Scottish Junior Cup in 1896–97. The Juniors took 600 supporters to Celtic Park for the final against Strathclyde, but were 3–0 behind on the hour; the Juniors brought the score back to 3–2 but could not force an equalizer. The final was replayed at Tynecastle Park after the Juniors showed that Strathclyde's M'Millan was ineligible, having played for the Clyde second XI that season, and this time Strathclyde won more convincingly, 3–0. The club was finally wound up at the end of the 1900–01 season.

== Colours ==
The club played in blue and white hooped jerseys and hose (originally accompanied by a striped cap), with navy shorts. The Juniors rotated the stripes to the vertical.

== Ground ==
The club originally played on the Town Green. For the start of the 1878–79 season, the club was using the cricket ground, also known as Lady's Mill Park, 15 minutes' walk from Dunfermline railway station, on the south side of Dunfermline.

== Honours ==
- Fifeshire Cup:
  - Winners: 1882–83, 1883–84
  - Runners–up: 1884–85
- Edinburgh Cup:
  - Runners-up: 1879–80
