= Powderhall =

Suburb of Edinburgh, Scotland

Coordinates: 55°58′0.13″N 3°11′32.88″W

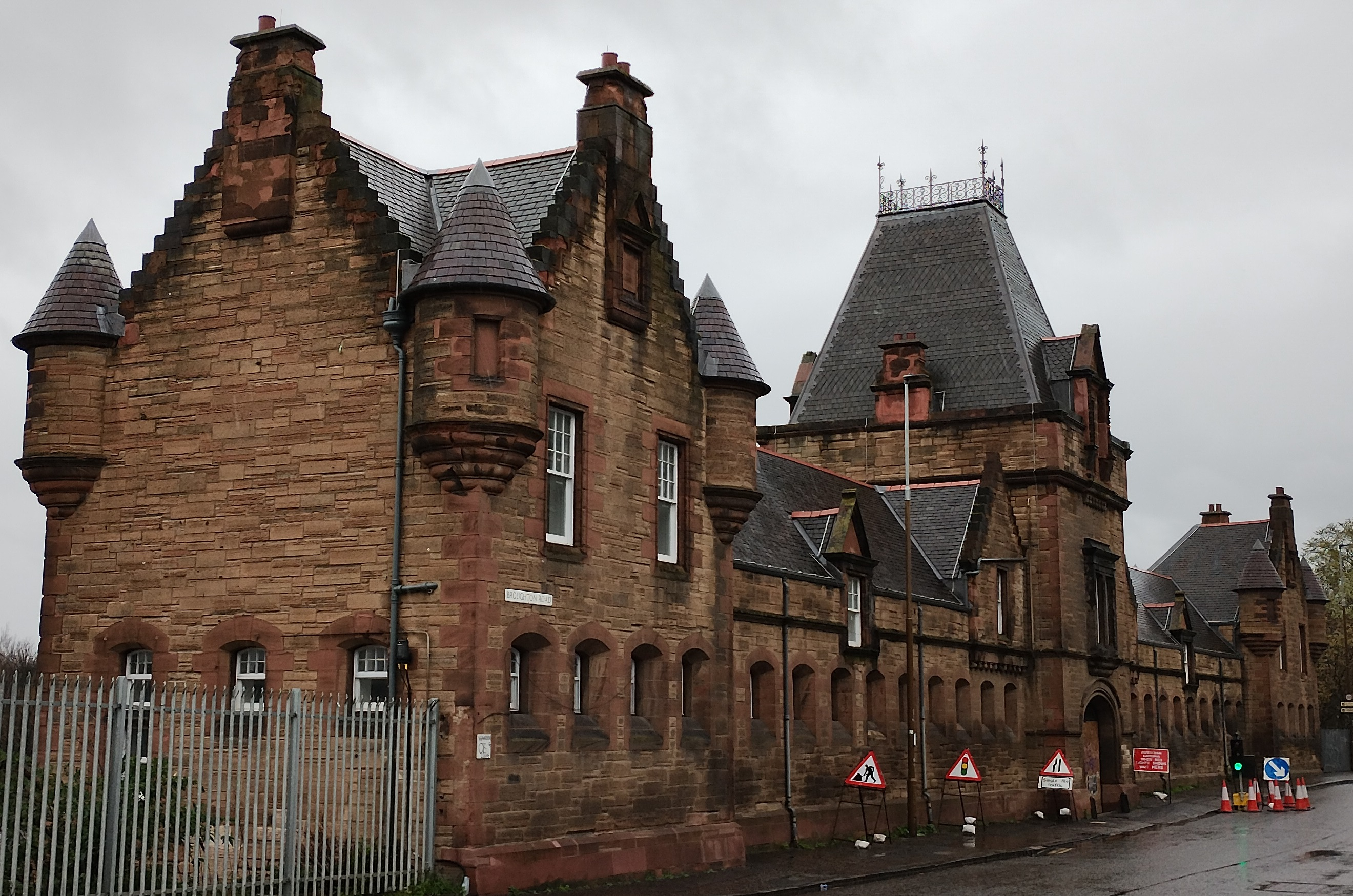
Powderhall Stables in April 2024

Powderhall is an area lying between Broughton Road and Warriston Road in the north of Edinburgh, the Scottish capital. Until recently it was best known for Powderhall Stadium, a greyhound racing track, which has now closed. The stadium also played host to motorcycle speedway racing from 1977 to 1995, as home to the Edinburgh Monarchs, who have since relocated to Armadale. The Powderhall Sprint, first held in 1870, was a professional footrace with handicapping of the runners. It continues, since 1999, as the New Year Sprint and is now held at Musselburgh Racecourse.

The name derives from a gunpowder factory and associated buildings on the edge of the Water of Leith set up by the Balfour family of Pilrig as one of their several enterprises in the early 18th century.

The site has been redeveloped for housing and business purposes, with the area having become casually (and for marketing purposes) known by the names “Powderhall Village” and, alternatively, “Canonmills Gardens”. This draws attention to its mixed identity as both a desirable village inofitself, and as a natural part of the Canonmills area. Most residents use the Warriston Path, through trees and over disused railway tracks (and a bridge), to get to central Canonmills, George V Park (through a tunnel), the Royal Botanic Garden or, further along, Stockbridge. Following the path downriver through Bonnington ends up at the Shore, Leith.

East Powderhall was once the location of the city's main waste management depots. Originally built as an incinerator, a new chimney on the plant was condemned in the 1990s and removed. Construction is now underway to convert the former waste transfer station (including Powderhall Stables) into mixed-use housing, green spaces, and art studios.
