= Brunswick F.C. =

Association football club in Scotland

Brunswick
- Full name: Brunswick Football Club
- Founded: 1877
- Dissolved: 1884
- Ground: Brunswick Park
- Captain: George Howell
Home colours

Brunswick Football Club was an association football club from the city of Edinburgh.

== History ==
The club was founded in 1877 by George Howell, a professional cricketer, out of the Brunswick Cricket Club, and who started the football section by recruiting a number of rugby union players. Brunswick entered the Edinburgh Cup in its first season of existence, losing 3–1 to Heart of Midlothian in its first tie, played on neutral territory at Newington.

The 1878–79 season saw the club's first Scottish Cup entry and its best run in the Edinburgh Cup, albeit by only winning one tie in the latter. In the national tournament, Brunswick lost 3–1 at the 3rd Edinburgh Rifle Volunteers, In the Edinburgh Cup, the club lost in the semi-final to Hibernian at Powderhall by 6 goals to 0, and a week later lost to the same club 6–1 in a friendly.

Brunswick's biggest competitive win came in the first round of the 1879–80 Scottish Cup, 5–0 over the declining Edinburgh Swifts. In the second round, the club lost 4–2 to Hearts at the Powderhall, Brunswick complaining that the third Hearts goal should not have been allowed, and the fourth - an own goal - was scored in darkness due to Hearts being late in providing a match ball. The club lost in the Edinburgh Cup in the quarter-finals at Hibernian, 4–3, having lost a three-goal lead.

With the growth of association football in Edinburgh, Brunswick was firmly in the shadow of Hearts and Hibs, and was overtaken by St Bernard's and Leith Athletic in short order. In 1878, Brunswick had 45 members, the same as Hearts and just five fewer than Hibs; in 1883 the club had dropped to 39 members, while Hearts, Hibs, and St Bernards all had over 150, the newly-senior Edina had 50, and even the Hanover club had attracted more members in its brief existence. The club's last win in the Scottish Cup was against Hanover in 1881–82 and in 1883–84 the club did not even enter the Edinburgh Cup, instead concentrating on the national cup, where it lost 8–0 to Hearts in the first round, six of the goals being scored by Wood; the Brunswick players were described as "out of condition" and only the goalkeeping of William Braidwood kept the score down. The match was the club's last competitive match and, although the cricket club continued, the football side seems to have been abandoned before the next season.

== Colours ==
The club played in black and white hoops, with white knickerbockers.

== Ground ==
The club played at Brunswick Park, on Easter Road.
