= Hanover F.C. (Edinburgh) =

Association football club in Scotland

Hanover
- Full name: Hanover Football Club
- Nickname(s): the Hanoverians
- Founded: 1875
- Dissolved: 1884
- Ground: East Meadows
- Captain: J. Bull
Home colours

Hanover Football Club was a football club from the city of Edinburgh.

== History ==
The club was formed in 1875, and was a founder member of the Edinburgh Football Association later in the year. The first fixture recorded for the club was a 1–1 draw with 3rd Edinburgh Rifle Volunteers on the Meadows in September 1875.

Hanover was one of the four sides which took part in the first Edinburgh Association cup, losing to the 3rd E.R.V. in its one tie.

Hanover's first entry to the Scottish Cup was in 1876–77, and the club lost in the first round to Edinburgh Thistle. The club improved its playing strength for 1877–78, retaining the previous season's players and developing a large membership, making it "one of the most promising of the district clubs", and although not as physically strong as the other side, considered a speedy side. The club's work was rewarded with a win in the first round of the Scottish Cup, 1–0 against the Thistle, and only going out to the strong Hibernian in a replay.

However that Cup win would be the club's only win in the Scottish Cup, despite entering every year until 1881–82. The club had more success in the Edinburgh Cup, regularly reaching the fourth round, although it had only one more semi-final appearance (in 1878–79).

The club did reach one final; in the 1878–79 President's Cup, a one-off tournament for a trophy presented by the President of the Edinburgh FA. Hanover brought in four players from the Govan club in order to gain an advantage in the final, which led to a protest from opponents Heart of Midlothian, and the game only went ahead after the regulations were checked and there found to be no rule against it. The match, at the Powderhall Stadium, ended 4–4, and Hearts scored the winner in extra-time.

By 1882 the club had fallen behind the two big Edinburgh clubs, and for a friendly with Hearts could only muster 10 players, and even that was only achieved by borrowing two from the short-lived Elgin club of Stockbridge Park. The club's last competitive fixture was a defeat to Bo'ness in the Edinburgh Consolation Cup in 1884; this was a new tournament for clubs eliminated in the earlier rounds of the Edinburgh Cup.

== Colours ==
The club played in light blue jerseys, white knickerbockers, and light blue stockings. Perhaps not coincidentally these were the colours of the Guelphic Order, particular to the House of Hanover.

== Ground ==
The club originally played at the East Meadows, in common with all of the early Edinburgh clubs. From 1880 to 1881 it played at the Royal Gymnasium, although it played its final Scottish Cup tie with Brunswick F.C. at Tynecastle.
