= Edinburgh Thistle F.C. =

Association football club in Scotland

Edinburgh Thistle
- Full name: Edinburgh Thistle Football Club
- Nickname(s): Thistle
- Founded: 1871
- Dissolved: 1900
- Ground: East Meadows
- Secretary: John Henderson
Home colours

Edinburgh Thistle Football Club was a football club from the city of Edinburgh.

== History ==
The club was formed in 1871, which would make Thistle the first association club in the city. The foundation date may be that of a cricket club from the Meadows from which the association football club may have been formed. By 1874 it was recognised that there were two association clubs in Edinburgh - the Thistle and the 3rd Edinburgh Rifle Volunteers F.C.; Thistle was playing matches between its members in 1873, before the 3rd E.R.V. was set up.

The club was one of the four founding members of the Edinburgh Football Association, formed in September 1875, with the 3rd E.R.V., Heart of Midlothian F.C., and Hanover. All except Hanover entered the Scottish Cup for the first time in 1875–76. At the time, the earliest rounds were played on a regional basis, and Hearts and the Volunteers were drawn to play each other, the winners to face Thistle in the second round of fixtures. The 3rd E.R.V. won through and beat Thistle 1–0 in a second round match replayed after the original game was abandoned through rain.

The same season saw the first Edinburgh Football Association cup, the first regional knockout tournament in Scotland. All four members of the Edinburgh FA entered. Thistle beat Hearts 1–0 in its semi-final tie, but lost 6–0 in the final to the 3rd E.R.V.

In 1876–77, Thistle beat Hibernian F.C. in the first round of the Edinburgh Cup 2–1, thanks to a late goal from Cochrane, and survived a protest from Hibs that an encroaching crowd (which sometimes was a yard inside the lines) had prevented an equalizer. Thistle beat Hanover in the semi-final. The final was due to take place on 24 February 1877, at the Meadows, but opponents 3rd E.R.V. did not show up, "much to the disappointment of a large concourse of spectators", so Thistle became Cup holders by default.

The swift growth of the game soon left Thistle behind and before the 1877–78 season the club lost a number of members, "and is not so strong as it has been". The club continued to enter the Scottish Cup until 1879–80 but only won twice; both times against Hanover, by 5–0 in 1876 and 2–1 in 1878. Its last entry to the Edinburgh Cup was in 1882, by which time the club had only won one more tie in the competition.

By 1883 the club had become a Junior club, and the final recorded games for the club were in the 1900–01 season.

== Colours ==
The club played in dark blue shirts with a single white stripe, and white knickers.

== Ground ==
The club played at the East Meadows.

== Notable players ==
- Willie Groves, who played for the Thistle as a 15 year old before joining Hibernian F.C.
