= Hibernian Park =

Stadium in Edinburgh, Scotland

Coordinates: 55°57′37″N 3°10′13″W

Hibernian Park was the home ground of the Scottish football club Hibernian from 1880 until the club's dissolution in 1891. When the club was reformed in 1892, the club took out on a lease on a site which became known as Easter Road. Hibernian Park was also located in the Easter Road area; in fact, it was closer to Easter Road itself than the present stadium because it was on the site of what is now Bothwell Street.

== History ==
Hibernian FC (Hibs) had played at a variety of grounds from their formation in 1875 until moving to Hibernian Park. Initially they played on the Meadows, along with all the other nascent Edinburgh clubs. They subsequently moved to grounds in Newington and Powderhall, but neither of these were used for more than a year at a time. Having lost the lease on the Newington ground in 1879, the opportunity to acquire a site off Easter Road was too good to miss because it was equidistant between Hibs' two main sources of supporters - the Little Ireland community of the Cowgate, and the Roman Catholic population of the port of Leith (Hibernian Park was situated a short distance inside the Edinburgh city boundary when Leith was a separate burgh, whereas Easter Road Stadium is located just inside Leith).

Hibernian Park was known by the Hibs supporters as The Holy Ground, in reference to the fact that the club was operated by St. Patrick's Church in the Cowgate. Hibs were essentially a sporting arm of the Catholic Church in Edinburgh from their formation until 1891. Hibs supporters still use this moniker for the present Easter Road stadium.

Perhaps the most famous game played at Hibernian Park was when Hibs beat The Invincibles of Preston North End 2–1 in a 1887 match described as being the Association Football Championship of the World. The ground also hosted one Scotland international, a 5–1 win against Wales in the 1888 British Home Championship, which was the first ever football international played in Edinburgh. Hibs players Willie Groves and James McLaren both played in the match, with Groves scoring Scotland's fourth goal. The ground also hosted the first ever recorded instance of a women's football match, 'Scotland' beating 'England' 3–0 on 7 May 1881.

After the high points of winning the Scottish Cup, beating Preston and hosting an international, however, Hibs were to suffer a dramatic decline and fall. This was largely precipitated by the formation of Celtic, who attracted many of Hibs' star players by offering financial inducements in a time when Scottish football was still amateur. As Hibs were operated on a charitable basis, they were essentially broke despite being one of the most popular clubs in Scotland. At the same time, Hibs were riven by internal politics relating to the Irish Home Rule bills; a former secretary absconded with a significant amount of funds; and the club inexplicably failed to enter the Scottish Football League when it was formed in 1890.

The last first team match played at Hibernian Park was a 9–1 defeat against Dumbarton in the Scottish Cup on 27 September 1890. Hibs had failed to secure the ground lease and building work had already started, which restricted the attendance the ground could hold. Later that season, the building work covered the rest of the park. This was during a period of intense construction work in the area. After the club failed to pay their subscriptions to the Scottish Football Association in 1891, Hibs were deleted from the membership rolls. Philip Farmer, an ancestor of Sir Tom Farmer, played a major role in resurrecting the club and securing the site that is now known as Easter Road.

== See also ==
- Scotland national football team home stadium
- History of Hibernian F.C.
