= Rosebery Charity Cup =

UK sports league

- Sport: Football (soccer)
- Founded: 1882
- No. of teams: Varied
- Country: Scotland
- Most recent champion: Hibernian (1945)

The Rosebery Charity Cup was a football competition organised for senior clubs from the East of Scotland.

== History ==
The tournament was organised by and named for an early patron of Scottish football, Archibald Primrose, 5th Earl of Rosebery. It received continued support from his son, Harry Primrose, 6th Earl of Rosebery, after Archibald's death in 1929. A charitable competition, the chief beneficiaries of the funds it raised were the Edinburgh Royal Infirmary and the Leith Hospital. It was traditionally played as the last games of the season and ran from the 1882–83 season to the 1944–45 season. The trophy is on display in the Heart of Midlothian Museum.

In 1932–33, to mark the tournament's 50th anniversary, the previous season's League champions Motherwell were invited to participate, while the venue for the final, Tynecastle, was draped in primrose and rose, the recognised Rosebery racing colours.

== Performance by club ==
| Club | Winners | Runners-up |
|---|---|---|
| Heart of Midlothian | 32 | 20 |
| Hibernian | 22 | 17 |
| Leith Athletic | 4 | 15 |
| St Bernard's | 4 | 7 |
| Mossend Swifts | 1 | 1 |
| Armadale | 0 | 1 |
| Motherwell | 0 | 1 |
| Rest of Edinburgh XI | 0 | 1 |

== See also ==
- Glasgow Merchants Charity Cup
- East of Scotland Shield
- Wilson Cup (football)
