= Adam McLean (footballer) =

Scottish footballer

Personal information
- Full name: Adam McLean
- Date of birth: 27 April 1899
- Place of birth: Glasgow, Scotland
- Date of death: June 29, 1973 (aged 74)
- Place of death: Glasgow, Scotland
- Height: 5 ft 6 in (1.68 m)
- Position: Outside left

Senior career*
Years	Team	Apps	(Gls)
1917–1928	Celtic	367	(125)
1928–1930	Sunderland	66	(13)
1930–1933	Aberdeen	74	(23)
1933–1934	Partick Thistle		

International career
1925–1927	Scotland	4	(1)
- * Club domestic league appearances and goals

Adam McLean (b. in Glasgow 27 April 1899, 29 June 1973) was a Scottish footballer, who played for Celtic, Sunderland, Aberdeen, and Partick Thistle. An outside-left, he was an integral part of the Celtic team of the 1920s. He provided many assists to Jimmy McGrory, the greatest British goalscorer of all time. In August 1928, after a dispute over terms, he departed Celtic Park with a great amount of hesitation for Sunderland before returning north again with Aberdeen. During the 1933 close season he was transferred to Partick Thistle.

== Career statistics ==
=== Club ===
Appearances and goals by club, season and competition
Club	Seasons	League			National Cup		Total	
Club	Seasons	Division	Apps	Goals	Apps	Goals	Apps	Goals
Celtic	1916–17	Scottish Division One	6	1	0	0	6	1
Celtic	1917–18	Scottish Division One	23	13	0	0	23	13
Celtic	1918–19	Scottish Division One	32	12	0	0	32	12
Celtic	1919–20	Scottish Division One	41	12	3	1	44	13
Celtic	1920–21	Scottish Division One	40	10	3	1	43	11
Celtic	1921–22	Scottish Division One	34	8	3	2	37	10
Celtic	1922–23	Scottish Division One	31	4	6	1	37	5
Celtic	1923–24	Scottish Division One	33	10	1	0	34	10
Celtic	1924–25	Scottish Division One	27	13	8	2	35	15
Celtic	1925–26	Scottish Division One	32	16	4	4	36	20
Celtic	1926–27	Scottish Division One	32	18	7	6	39	24
Celtic	1927–28	Scottish Division One	36	8	6	3	42	11
Celtic	Total		367	125	41	20	408	145
Sunderland	1928–29	First Division	41	7	0	0	41	7
Sunderland	1929–30	First Division	25	7	4	2	29	9
Sunderland	Total		66	14	4	2	70	16
Aberdeen	1930–31	Scottish Division One	24	11	6	2	30	13
Aberdeen	1931–32	Scottish Division One	25	8	1	0	26	8
Aberdeen	1932–33	Scottish Division One	25	5	3	0	28	5
Aberdeen	Total		74	24	10	2	84	26
Partick Thistle	1933–34	Scottish Division One	-	-	-	-	8	3
Career total			507+	163+	55+	24+	570	190

=== International appearances ===
Appearances and goals by national team and year
National team	Year	Apps	Goals
Scotland	1925	1	1
Scotland	1926	2	0
Scotland	1927	1	0
Total		4	1

=== International goals ===
Scores and results list Scotland's goal tally first, score column indicates score after each McLean goal

List of international goals scored by Adam McLean
No.	Date	Venue	Opponent	Score	Result	Competition
1	31 October 1925	Ninian Park, Cardiff	Wales	2–0	3–0	1925–26 British Home Championship
