= Mattha Smith =

Scottish footballer

Personal information
- Full name: Matthew Smith
- Date of birth: 31 December 1897
- Place of birth: Stevenston, Scotland
- Date of death: 16 May 1953 (aged 55)
- Place of death: Kilmarnock, Scotland
- Position: Forward

Senior career*
Years	Team	Apps	(Gls)
–1916	Ardeer Thistle		
1916–1931	Kilmarnock	413	(109)
1931–1933	Ayr United	33	(3)
1933–1934	Galston		

International career
1916	Scotland Juniors	1	(0)
- * Club domestic league appearances and goals

Matthew Smith (31 December 1897 – 16 May 1953) was a Scottish professional footballer who made over 410 appearances in the Scottish League for Kilmarnock as a forward. He captained the club and is the only player to have won two major trophies during their time at Rugby Park. He was capped by Scotland at junior level. After retiring from football, Smith coached at Ardrossan Winton Rovers and returned to Kilmarnock as a scout.

== Personal life ==
Smith's grandson Gordon also became a professional footballer.

== Career statistics ==
Appearances and goals by club, season and competition
Club	Season (Note: Smith missed the entire 1918–19 season due to injury.)	League			Scottish Cup		Total	
Club	Season	Division	Apps	Goals	Apps	Goals	Apps	Goals
Kilmarnock	1916–17	Scottish Division One	35	11	―		35	11
Kilmarnock	1917–18	Scottish Division One	29	13	―		29	13
Kilmarnock	1919–20	Scottish Division One	30	6	4	0	34	6
Kilmarnock	1920–21	Scottish Division One	38	10	0	0	38	10
Kilmarnock	1921–22	Scottish Division One	34	7	1	0	35	7
Kilmarnock	1922–23	Scottish Division One	36	5	3	1	39	6
Kilmarnock	1923–24	Scottish Division One	30	6	2	0	32	6
Kilmarnock	1924–25	Scottish Division One	36	14	3	1	39	15
Kilmarnock	1925–26	Scottish Division One	35	8	1	0	36	8
Kilmarnock	1926–27	Scottish Division One	1	0	0	0	1	0
Kilmarnock	1927–28	Scottish Division One	26	3	3	2	29	5
Kilmarnock	1928–29	Scottish Division One	31	13	6	2	37	15
Kilmarnock	1929–30	Scottish Division One	37	10	1	0	38	10
Kilmarnock	1930–31	Scottish Division One	15	0	3	0	18	0
Kilmarnock	Total		413	109	24	6	437	115
Ayr United	1931–32	Scottish Division One	16	0	2	0	18	0
Ayr United	1932–33	Scottish Division One	17	3	3	0	20	3
Ayr United	Total		33	3	5	0	38	3
Career total			446	112	29	6	475	118

== Honours ==
Kilmarnock

- Scottish Cup: 1919–20, 1928–29
