= 1918–19 Celtic F.C. season =

Celtic
1918–19 season
- Manager: Willie Maley
- Stadium: Celtic Park
- Scottish First Division: 1st

The 1918–19 Scottish football season was Celtic's 31st season of competitive football, in which they competed in the Scottish First Division. Celtic won the league title by one point over nearest rival Rangers, mirroring the narrow victory their Glasgow rivals had achieved the previous season. It was Celtic's 15th league title, as well as their 24th major domestic honour.

For the fifth and last season, the Scottish Cup remained suspended because of World War I. Celtic remained title holders as they had been the last champions in 1914.

== Competitions ==
=== Scottish First Division ===
==== League table ====
Pos	Team	Pld	W	D	L	GF	GA	GD	Pts
1	Celtic	34	26	6	2	71	22	+49	58
2	Rangers	34	26	5	3	86	16	+70	57
3	Morton	34	18	11	5	76	40	+36	47
4	Partick Thistle	34	17	7	10	62	43	+19	41
5	Motherwell	34	14	10	10	51	40	+11	38

Source: "1918-1919 SFL - SPFL Archive". SPFL.

==== Matches ====
17 August 1918 First Division	Hibernian	0–3	Celtic	Edinburgh
				Stadium: Easter Road; Attendance: 10,000

24 August 1918 First Division	Celtic	1–1	Morton	Glasgow
				Stadium: Celtic Park; Attendance: 30,000

31 August 1918 First Division	Clyde	0–3	Celtic	Glasgow
				Stadium: Shawfield Stadium; Attendance: 12,000

7 September 1918 First Division	Celtic	1–0	Ayr United	Glasgow
				Stadium: Celtic Park; Attendance: 15,000

14 September 1918 First Division	Queen's Park	0–3	Celtic	Glasgow
				Stadium: Hampden Park; Attendance: 25,000

28 September 1918 First Division	Falkirk	1–2	Celtic	Falkirk
				Stadium: Brockville Park; Attendance: 6,500

30 September 1918 First Division	Celtic	3–1	Third Lanark	Glasgow
				Stadium: Celtic Park; Attendance: 20,000

12 October 1918 First Division	Kilmarnock	1–1	Celtic	Kilmarnock
				Stadium: Rugby Park; Attendance: 10,000

19 October 1918 First Division	Celtic	0–3	Rangers	Glasgow
				Stadium: Celtic Park; Attendance: 36,000

26 October 1918 First Division	Dumbarton	0–5	Celtic	Dumbarton
				Stadium: Boghead Park; Attendance: 6,000

2 November 1918 First Division	Celtic	1–0	St Mirren	Glasgow
				Stadium: Celtic Park; Attendance: 8,000

9 November 1918 First Division	Celtic	1–1	Hearts	Glasgow
				Stadium: Celtic Park; Attendance: 11,000

23 November 1918 First Division	Partick Thistle	0–1	Celtic	Glasgow
				Stadium: Firhill Park; Attendance: 25,000

7 December 1918 First Division	Motherwell	3–1	Celtic	Motherwell
				Stadium: Fir Park; Attendance: 14,000

14 December 1918 First Division	Celtic	2–0	Dumbarton	Glasgow
				Stadium: Celtic Park; Attendance: 6,000

21 December 1918 First Division	Hamilton Academical	1–2	Celtic	Hamilton
				Stadium: Douglas Park; Attendance: 12,000

28 December 1918 First Division	Celtic	2–0	Hibernian	Glasgow
				Stadium: Celtic Park; Attendance: 10,000

1 January 1919 First Division	Rangers	1–1	Celtic	Glasgow
				Stadium: Ibrox Park; Attendance: 65,000

2 January 1919 First Division	Celtic	2–0	Clyde	Glasgow
				Stadium: Celtic Park; Attendance: 15,000

4 January 1919 First Division	Third Lanark	2–3	Celtic	Glasgow
				Stadium: Cathkin Park; Attendance: 20,000

11 January 1919 First Division	Celtic	3–1	Clydebank	Glasgow
				Stadium: Celtic Park; Attendance: 16,000

18 January 1919 First Division	St Mirren	0–4	Celtic	Paisley
				Stadium: St Mirren Park, Love Street; Attendance: 16,000

25 January 1919 First Division	Celtic	0–0	Motherwell	Glasgow
				Stadium: Celtic Park; Attendance: 25,000

1 February 1919 First Division	Celtic	2–1	Kilmarnock	Glasgow
				Stadium: Celtic Park; Attendance: 25,000

8 February 1919 First Division	Airdrieonians	1–2	Celtic	Airdrie
				Stadium: Broomfield Park; Attendance: 15,000

15 February 1919 First Division	Celtic	4–1	Hamilton Academical	Glasgow
				Stadium: Celtic Park; Attendance: 10,000

22 February 1919 First Division	Celtic	2–1	Partick Thistle	Glasgow
				Stadium: Celtic Park; Attendance: 20,000

8 March 1919 First Division	Morton	0–0	Celtic	Greenock
				Stadium: Cappielow Park; Attendance: 15,000

22 March 1919 First Division	Celtic	2–0	Queen's Park	Glasgow
				Stadium: Celtic Park; Attendance: 16,000

12 April 1919 First Division	Clydebank	0–2	Celtic	Clydebank
				Stadium: Clydeholm Park; Attendance: 17,000

19 April 1919 First Division	Celtic	4–0	Falkirk	Glasgow
				Stadium: Celtic Park; Attendance: 12,000

21 April 1919 First Division	Celtic	3–0	Airdrieonians	Glasgow
				Stadium: Celtic Park; Attendance: 15,000

28 April 1919 First Division	Hearts	2–3	Celtic	Edinburgh
				Stadium: Tynecastle Park; Attendance: 16,000

10 May 1919 First Division	Ayr United	0–2	Celtic	Ayr
				Stadium: Somerset Park; Attendance: 10,000

== See also ==
- 1919 Victory Cup
