= 1923–24 Celtic F.C. season =

Celtic
1923–24 season
- Manager: Willie Maley
- Stadium: Celtic Park
- Scottish First Division: 3rd
- Scottish Cup: First round

The 1923–24 Scottish football season was Celtic's 36th season of competitive football, in which they competed in the Scottish First Division and the Scottish Cup.

In the league, Celtic ended third below Rangers and Airdrieonians, same as the previous year.

In the Scottish Cup, which they entered as champions, they lost 2-0 away to Kilmarnock in the first round.

This was the last season in which captain Willie Cringan played for Celtic, as he transferred early in the season to Third Lanark.

== Competitions ==
=== Scottish First Division ===
==== League table ====
Pos	Team	Pld	W	D	L	GF	GA	GD	Pts
1	Rangers	38	25	9	4	72	22	+50	59
2	Airdrieonians	38	20	10	8	72	46	+26	50
3	Celtic	38	17	12	9	56	33	+23	46
4	Raith Rovers	38	18	7	13	56	38	+18	43
5	Dundee	38	15	13	10	70	57	+13	43

Source: "1923-1924 Division 1 - SPFL Archive". SPFL (in Malay).

==== Matches ====
18 August 1923 First Division	Celtic	2–1	Falkirk	Glasgow
				Stadium: Celtic Park; Attendance: 10,000

25 August 1923 First Division	Clydebank	0–0	Celtic	Clydebank
				Stadium: Clydeholm Park; Attendance: 10,000

1 September 1923 First Division	Celtic	1–2	Partick Thistle	Glasgow
				Stadium: Celtic Park; Attendance: 15,000

8 September 1923 First Division	Queen's Park	0–2	Celtic	Glasgow
				Stadium: Hampden Park; Attendance: 20,000

17 September 1923 First Division	Hibernian	0–0	Celtic	Edinburgh
				Stadium: Easter Road; Attendance: 14,000

22 September 1923 First Division	Ayr United	4–2	Celtic	Ayr
				Stadium: Somerset Park; Attendance: 8,000

24 September 1923 First Division	Celtic	3–0	Morton	Glasgow
				Stadium: Celtic Park; Attendance: 5,000

29 September 1923 First Division	Aberdeen	0–2	Celtic	Aberdeen
				Stadium: Pittodrie Park; Attendance: 18,000

6 October 1923 First Division	Celtic	4–0	Clyde	Glasgow
				Stadium: Celtic Park; Attendance: 8,000

13 October 1923 First Division	Hearts	0–0	Celtic	Edinburgh
				Stadium: Tynecastle Park; Attendance: 26,500

20 October 1924 First Division	Celtic	0–0	Raith Rovers	Glasgow
				Stadium: Celtic Park; Attendance: 4,500

27 October 1923 First Division	Rangers	0–0	Celtic	Glasgow
				Stadium: Ibrox Park; Attendance: 38,000

3 November 1923 First Division	Celtic	2–2	Airdrieonians	Glasgow
				Stadium: Celtic Park; Attendance: 15,000

10 November 1923 First Division	Hamilton Academical	2–5	Celtic	Hamilton
				Stadium: Douglas Park; Attendance: 10,000

17 November 1923 First Division	Celtic	0–0	Dundee	Glasgow
				Stadium: Celtic Park; Attendance: 10,000

24 November 1923 First Division	St Mirren	0–1	Celtic	Paisley
				Stadium: St Mirren Park, Love Street; Attendance: 14,000

1 December 1923 First Division	Celtic	3–1	Third Lanark	Glasgow
				Stadium: Celtic Park; Attendance: 15,000

8 December 1923 First Division	Kilmarnock	1–1	Celtic	Kilmarnock
				Stadium: Rugby Park; Attendance: 12,000

15 December 1923 First Division	Celtic	2–1	Motherwell	Glasgow
				Stadium: Celtic Park; Attendance: 12,000

22 December 1923 First Division	Dundee	2–1	Celtic	Dundee
				Stadium: Dens Park; Attendance: 20,000

1 January 1924 First Division	Celtic	2–2	Rangers	Glasgow
				Stadium: Celtic Park; Attendance: 60,000

2 January 1924 First Division	Clyde	0–0	Celtic	Glasgow
				Stadium: Shawfield Stadium; Attendance: 15,000

5 January 1924 First Division	Celtic	1–0	Hamilton Academical	Glasgow
				Stadium: Celtic Park; Attendance: 5,000

12 January 1924 First Division	Third Lanark	1–3	Celtic	Glasgow
				Stadium: Cathkin Park; Attendance: 12,000

19 January 1924 First Division	Celtic	4–0	Aberdeen	Glasgow
				Stadium: Celtic Park; Attendance: 17,000

2 February 1924 First Division	Morton	1–0	Celtic	Greenock
				Stadium: Cappielow Park; Attendance: 8,000

13 February 1924 First Division	Motherwell	0–1	Celtic	Motherwell
				Stadium: Fir Park; Attendance: 8,000

16 February 1924 First Division	Celtic	1–0	Queen's Park	Glasgow
				Stadium: Celtic Park; Attendance: 7,000

26 February 1924 First Division	Celtic	4–1	Hearts	Glasgow
				Stadium: Celtic Park; Attendance: 8,000

1 March 1924 First Division	Partick Thistle	1–1	Celtic	Glasgow
				Stadium: Firhill Park; Attendance: 1,500

4 March 1924 First Division	Celtic	1–2	Clydebank	Glasgow
				Stadium: Celtic Park; Attendance: 6,000

8 March 1924 First Division	Celtic	2–1	Kilmarnock	Glasgow
				Stadium: Celtic Park; Attendance: 16,000

15 March 1924 First Division	Falkirk	3–1	Celtic	Falkirk
				Stadium: Brockville Park; Attendance: 7,000

22 March 1924 First Division	Raith Rovers	1–0	Celtic	Kirkcaldy
				Stadium: Stark's Park; Attendance: 4,000

29 March 1924 First Division	Airdrieonians	2–0	Celtic	Airdrie
				Stadium: Broomfield Park; Attendance: 10,000

5 April 1924 First Division	Celtic	3–0	Ayr United	Glasgow
				Stadium: Celtic Park; Attendance: 4,000

12 April 1924 First Division	Celtic	0–1	St Mirren	Glasgow
				Stadium: Celtic Park; Attendance: 3,000

26 April 1924 First Division	Celtic	1–1	Hibernian	Glasgow
				Stadium: Celtic Park; Attendance: 5,000

=== Scottish Cup ===
26 January 1924 First round	Kilmarnock	2–0	Celtic	Kilmarnock
				Stadium: Rugby Park; Attendance: 17,200

== Friendly in Ireland ==
23 February 1924	League of Ireland XI	0–3	Celtic	Dublin
			Cassidy; McAtee	Stadium: Dalymount Park; Attendance: 22,200; Referee: J. Bambrook (Wales)
