= 1925–26 Hibernian F.C. season =

Hibernian
1925–26 season
- Manager: Alex Maley (to October); Bobby Templeton (from October)
- Scottish First Division: 16th
- Scottish Cup: R2
- Average home league attendance: 12,875 (down 967)

During the 1925–26 season Hibernian, a football club based in Edinburgh, finished sixteenth out of 20 clubs in the Scottish First Division.

== Scottish First Division ==
Match Day	Date	Opponent	H/A	Score	Hibernian Scorer(s)	Attendance
1	15 August	Celtic	A	0–5		22,000
2	22 August	Kilmarnock	H	8–0		17,000
3	29 August	St Johnstone	A	0–0		5,500
4	5 September	Dundee	H	2–1		18,000
5	12 September	Motherwell	A	1–2		8,000
6	19 September	Partick Thistle	H	3–4		12,000
7	21 September	Rangers	H	0–2		15,000
8	26 September	Raith Rovers	A	0–1		8,000
9	3 October	St Mirren	H	0–2		10,000
10	10 October	Aberdeen	A	0–5		12,000
11	17 October	Heart of Midlothian	H	0–0		20,000
12	24 October	Queen's Park	A	0–2		10,000
13	31 October	Falkirk	H	3–1		10,000
14	7 November	Cowdenbeath	A	1–3		5,000
15	14 November	Hamilton Academical	A	0–1		6,000
16	21 November	Clydebank	H	5–1		8,000
17	28 November	Dundee United	A	2–2		5,000
18	5 December	Hamilton Academical	H	8–4		10,000
19	12 December	Rangers	A	1–3		22,000
20	26 December	Dundee	A	4–1		6,000
21	1 January	Heart of Midlothian	A	4–1		33,000
22	2 January	Aberdeen	H	0–0		17,000
23	4 January	St Johnstone	H	0–3		14,000
24	9 January	Partick Thistle	A	1–2		10,000
25	13 January	Morton	H	4–1		8,000
26	16 January	Celtic	H	4–4		25,000
27	30 January	Airdrieonians	H	1–4		16,000
28	10 February	Morton	A	5–2		3,000
29	13 February	Motherwell	H	3–1		14,000
30	20 February	Queen's Park	H	1–2		10,000
31	27 February	St Mirren	A	1–2		7,000
32	6 March	Cowdenbeath	H	1–2		10,500
33	13 March	Clydebank	A	1–0		3,000
34	20 March	Raith Rovers	H	2–0		10,000
35	27 March	Airdrieonians	A	1–5		5,000
36	10 April	Dundee United	H	3–5		8,000
37	17 April	Falkirk	A	1–1		6,500
38	24 April	Kilmarnock	H	1–2		5,000

=== Final League table ===
P	Team	Pld	W	D	L	GF	GA	GD	Pts
15	Morton	38	12	7	19	57	84	–27	31
16	Hibernian	38	12	6	20	72	77	–5	30
17	Dundee United	38	11	6	21	52	74	–22	28

=== Scottish Cup ===
Round	Date	Opponent	H/A	Score	Hibernian Scorer(s)	Attendance
R1	23 January	Broxburn United	H	1–1		14,000
R1 R	26 January	Broxburn United	H	1–0		9,000
R2	6 February	Airdrieonians	H	2–3		20,000

== See also ==
- List of Hibernian F.C. seasons
