= 1923–24 Heart of Midlothian F.C. season =

Heart of Midlothian
1923–24 season
- Manager: Willie McCartney
- Stadium: Tynecastle Park
- Scottish First Division: 9th
- Scottish Cup: 4th Round

During the 1923–24 season Hearts competed in the Scottish First Division, the Scottish Cup and the East of Scotland Shield.

== Fixtures ==
=== Scottish Cup ===
26 January 1924 Scottish Cup R1	Third Lanark	0–0	Hearts	Cathkin Park
				Attendance: 23,000

30 January 1924 Scottish Cup R1 Replay	Hearts	3–0	Third Lanark	Tynecastle Park
				Attendance: 18,000

9 February 1924 Scottish Cup R2	Hearts	6–0	Galston	Tynecastle Park
				Attendance: 14,000

23 February 1924 Scottish Cup R3	Hearts	3–1	Clyde	Tynecastle Park
				Attendance: 27,000

8 March 1924 Scottish Cup R2	Hearts	1–2	Falkirk	Tynecastle Park
				Attendance: 34,500

=== Scottish First Division ===
18 August 1923 Scottish First Division	Hearts	3–3	Clyde	Tynecastle Park
				Attendance: 20,500

25 August 1923 Scottish First Division	Dundee	5–1	Hearts	Dens Park
				Attendance: 13,000

1 September 1923 Scottish First Division	Hearts	4–0	Hamilton Academical	Tynecastle Park
				Attendance: 19,500

8 September 1923 Scottish First Division	Hibernian	1–1	Hearts	Easter Road
				Attendance: 20,000

15 September 1923 Scottish First Division	Hearts	2–0	Clydebank	Tynecastle Park
				Attendance: 15,500

17 September 1923 Scottish First Division	Hearts	0–0	Rangers	Tynecastle Park
				Attendance: 24,000

22 September 1923 Scottish First Division	Morton	1–0	Hearts	Cappielow Park
				Attendance: 5,000

29 September 1923 Scottish First Division	Hearts	2–3	Ayr United	Tynecastle Park
				Attendance: 17,000

6 October 1923 Scottish First Division	Third Lanark	2–1	Hearts	Cathkin Park
				Attendance: 8,000

13 October 1923 Scottish First Division	Hearts	0–0	Celtic	Tynecastle Park
				Attendance: 26,500

20 October 1923 Scottish First Division	Falkirk	0–0	Hearts	Brockville Park
				Attendance: 10,000

27 October 1923 Scottish First Division	Hearts	2–1	Partick Thistle	Tynecastle Park
				Attendance: 19,000

3 November 1923 Scottish First Division	Motherwell	3–2	Hearts	Tynecastle Park
				Attendance: 6,000

10 November 1923 Scottish First Division	Hearts	4–1	Kilmarnock	Tynecastle Park
				Attendance: 13,500

17 November 1923 Scottish First Division	Airdrieonians	3–0	Hearts	Broomfield Park
				Attendance: 10,000

24 November 1923 Scottish First Division	Raith Rovers	1–1	Hearts	Tynecastle Park
				Attendance: 10,000

1 December 1923 Scottish First Division	Hearts	3–1	Morton	Tynecastle Park
				Attendance: 13,000

8 December 1923 Scottish First Division	Hearts	0–1	Aberdeen	Tynecastle Park
				Attendance: 14,000

15 December 1923 Scottish First Division	St Mirren	0–0	Hearts	St Mirren Park, Love Street
				Attendance: 6,000

22 December 1923 Scottish First Division	Kilmarnock	2–1	Hearts	Rugby Park
				Attendance: 10,000

29 December 1923 Scottish First Division	Hearts	1–0	Dundee	Tynecastle Park
				Attendance: 13,000

1 January 1924 Scottish First Division	Hearts	1–1	Hibernian	Tynecastle Park
				Attendance: 26,000

2 January 1924 Scottish First Division	Hearts	0–0	St Mirren	Tynecastle Park
				Attendance: 15,000

5 January 1924 Scottish First Division	Aberdeen	2–1	Hearts	Pittodrie Park
				Attendance: 16,000

12 January 1924 Scottish First Division	Hearts	5–2	Queen's Park	Tynecastle Park
				Attendance: 16,000

19 January 1924 Scottish First Division	Clydebank	2–1	Hearts	Clydeholm Park
				Attendance: 3,000

2 February 1924 Scottish First Division	Queen's Park	1–1	Hearts	Hampden Park
				Attendance: 10,000

13 February 1924 Scottish First Division	Hearts	4–2	Airdrieonians	Tynecastle Park
				Attendance: 6,000

16 February 1924 Scottish First Division	Hamilton Academical	1–3	Hearts	Douglas Park
				Attendance: 10,000

26 February 1924 Scottish First Division	Celtic	4–1	Hearts	Celtic Park
				Attendance: 8,000

1 March 1924 Scottish First Division	Hearts	1–2	Raith Rovers	Tynecastle Park
				Attendance: 17,000

11 March 1924 Scottish First Division	Rangers	1–0	Hearts	Tynecastle Park
				Attendance: 6,000

15 March 1924 Scottish First Division	Hearts	3–1	Third Lanark	Tynecastle Park
				Attendance: 11,000

22 March 1924 Scottish First Division	Ayr United	2–1	Hearts	Somerset Park
				Attendance: 3,000

29 March 1924 Scottish First Division	Hearts	2–1	Motherwell	Tynecastle Park
				Attendance: 11,000

5 April 1924 Scottish First Division	Hearts	3–1	Falkirk	Tynecastle Park
				Attendance: 11,500

19 April 1924 Scottish First Division	Partick Thiste	0–1	Hearts	Firhill Park
				Attendance: 3,000

21 April 1924 Scottish First Division	Clyde	2–2	Hearts	Shawfield Stadium
				Attendance: 2,000

== See also ==
- List of Heart of Midlothian F.C. seasons
