= Andrew McAtee =

Scottish footballer

Andy McAtee
Personal information
- Full name: Andrew McAtee
- Date of birth: 2 July 1888
- Place of birth: Cumbernauld, Scotland
- Date of death: 15 July 1956 (aged 68)
- Place of death: Condorrat, Scotland
- Position: Outside right

Senior career*
Years	Team	Apps	(Gls)
–1910	Mossend Hibernian		
1910–1924	Celtic	407	(68)
1925	New Bedford Whalers	3	(1)
1926	Newark Skeeters	4	(0)

International career
1912–1920	Scottish League XI	7	(1)
1913	Scotland	1	(0)
- * Club domestic league appearances and goals

Andrew McAtee (2 July 1888 – 15 July 1956) was a Scottish footballer who played for Celtic, New Bedford Whalers, Newark Skeeters and Scotland. He played a total of 461 matches for Celtic, winning 10 major trophies.

== Club career ==
=== Celtic ===
McAtee was born in Cumbernauld (then a tiny village) although appears to have been raised in the neighbouring village of Croy, home to another Celtic great of the era, Jimmy Quinn; he joined Celtic in 1910. A fast right winger with strong legs 'said to resemble those of a billiard table' and a fondness for cutting inside to unleash a powerful shot, McAtee formed an effective partnership with Patsy Gallacher.

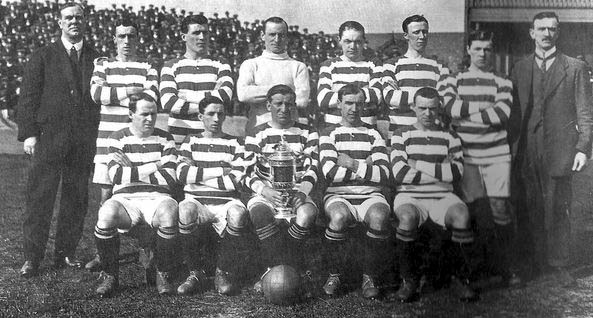
1914 Celtic team photo with the Scottish Cup; McAtee is bottom row, first left

He had already won one Scottish Football League Championship and three Scottish Cups when his career was interrupted by World War I, although the league continued to operate. From a mining background, McAtee was employed in that reserved occupation for much of the period of conflict, with players of the time who did not join the armed forces playing football at weekends on top of a full-time work shift. After winning three wartime titles he was conscripted in 1917 and served in Italy.

On returning to Scotland McAtee resumed his successful football career with Celtic, participating in two further league title-winning seasons for a total of six. He also featured in a further Scottish Cup victory in 1923, twelve years after his first in 1911, and won four Glasgow Cups (scoring the winning goal against Clyde in the 1920-21 final) and six successive Charity Cups.

=== United States ===
McAtee departed from Celtic in 1924, moving to Massachusetts where he featured for the New Bedford Whalers (managed by former teammate Charlie Shaw), and also featuring for the Newark Skeeters. Many other Scottish players of the era also made the move across the Atlantic to play in the 1920s American Soccer League.

== International career ==
He made one appearance for Scotland in 1913 versus Wales but was selected more frequently for the Scottish League XI, playing in seven games between 1912 and 1920 and scoring once, on his debut. International games were all but suspended during the war, so he had no chance to play during what would have been his peak years.

== Later life ==
In his later years he returned to Lanarkshire. He died in 1956 and is buried in the same Kilsyth cemetery as Jimmy Quinn - a memorial service in his honour was held at the cemetery in 2015, attended by club representatives Jim Craig and Tom Boyd.

== Honours ==
Celtic

- Scottish League: 1913–14, 1914–15, 1915–16, 1916–17, 1918–19, 1921–22
- Scottish Cup: 1911-12, 1911-12, 1913–14, 1922–23
- Glasgow Cup: 1916, 1917, 1920, 1921
