= 1925–26 Heart of Midlothian F.C. season =

Heart of Midlothian
1925–26 season
- Manager: Willie McCartney
- Stadium: Tynecastle Park
- Scottish First Division: 3rd
- Scottish Cup: 3rd Round

During the 1925–26 season Hearts competed in the Scottish First Division, the Scottish Cup and the East of Scotland Shield.

== Fixtures ==
=== Scottish Cup ===
23 January 1926 Scottish Cup R1	Dundee United	3–2	Hearts	Tannadice Park
				Attendance: 15,522

27 January 1926 Scottish Cup R1 Replay	Hearts	1–1	Dundee United	Tynecastle Park
				Attendance: 25,000

1 February 1926 Scottish Cup R1 2nd Replay	Hearts	6–0	Dundee United	Tynecastle Park
				Attendance: 20,000

6 February 1926 Scottish Cup R2	Hearts	5–2	Alloa Athletic	Tynecastle Park
				Attendance: 18,000

20 February 1926 Scottish Cup R3	Hearts	0–4	Celtic	Tynecastle Park
				Attendance: 52,000

=== Scottish First Division ===
15 August 1925 Scottish First Division	Hearts	1–1	Falkirk	Tynecastle Park
				Attendance: 28,000

22 August 1925 Scottish First Division	Hamilton Academical	3–0	Hearts	Douglas Park
				Attendance: 8,000

29 August 1925 Scottish First Division	Hearts	0–2	Airdrieonians	Tynecastle Park
				Attendance: 27,500

5 September 1925 Scottish First Division	Morton	1–1	Hearts	Cappielow Park
				Attendance: 5,000

12 September 1925 Scottish First Division	Hearts	7–0	Clydebank	Tynecastle Park
				Attendance: 19,000

19 September 1925 Scottish First Division	Queen's Park	3–4	Hearts	Hampden Park
				Attendance: 10,000

21 September 1925 Scottish First Division	Hearts	1–0	Aberdeen	Tynecastle Park
				Attendance: 19,500

26 September 1926 Scottish First Division	Hearts	3–0	Rangers	Tynecastle Park
				Attendance: 22,500

3 October 1925 Scottish First Division	Dundee	1–0	Hearts	Dens Park
				Attendance: 8,000

10 October 1925 Scottish First Division	Hearts	4–3	Cowdenbeath	Tynecastle Park
				Attendance: 24,000

17 October 1925 Scottish First Division	Hibernian	0–0	Hearts	Easter Road
				Attendance: 20,000

24 October 1925 Scottish First Division	Hearts	3–0	Partick Thistle	Tynecastle Park
				Attendance: 22,500

31 October 1925 Scottish First Division	St Mirren	2–1	Hearts	St Mirren Park, Love Street
				Attendance: 8,000

7 November 1925 Scottish First Division	Hearts	1–0	Dundee United	Tynecastle Park
				Attendance: 15,000

14 November 1925 Scottish First Division	Hearts	3–1	Motherwell	Tynecastle Park
				Attendance: 19,500

25 November 1925 Scottish First Division	Celtic	3–0	Hearts	Celtic Park
				Attendance: 7,000

28 November 1925 Scottish First Division	Hearts	1–0	Kilmarnock	Tynecastle Park
				Attendance: 13,000

5 December 1925 Scottish First Division	Aberdeen	0–2	Hearts	Pittodrie Park
				Attendance: 12,000

12 December 1925 Scottish First Division	Hearts	4–2	St Johnstone	Tynecastle Park
				Attendance: 16,000

19 December 1925 Scottish First Division	Motherwell	3–1	Hearts	Fir Park
				Attendance: 6,000

26 December 1925 Scottish First Division	Hearts	1–0	St Mirren	Tynecastle Park
				Attendance: 11,500

1 January 1926 Scottish First Division	Hearts	1–4	Hibernian	Tynecastle Park
				Attendance: 33,000

2 January 1926 Scottish First Division	Cowdenbeath	1–2	Hearts	Central Park
				Attendance: 10,000

4 January 1926 Scottish First Division	Raith Rovers	1–3	Hearts Morton	Stark's Park
				Attendance: 6,000

9 January 1926 Scottish First Division	Hearts	4–2	Queen's Park	Tynecastle Park
				Attendance: 17,000

16 January 1926 Scottish First Division	Rangers	2–2	Hearts	Ibrox Park
				Attendance: 25,000

30 January 1926 Scottish First Division	Falkirk	3–3	Hearts	Brockville Park
				Attendance: 10,000

10 February 1926 Scottish First Division	Hearts	4–0	Hamilton Academical	Tynecastle Park
				Attendance: 6,000

13 February 1926 Scottish First Division	Airdrieonians	2–2	Hearts	Broomfield Park
				Attendance: 7,000

24 February 1926 Scottish First Division	Dundee United	2–3	Hearts	Tannadice Park
				Attendance: 5,000

3 March 1926 Scottish First Division	Hearts	1–2	Celtic	Tynecastle Park
				Attendance: 14,500

6 March 1926 Scottish First Division	St Johnstone	1–1	Hearts	Muirton Park
				Attendance: 5,500

13 March 1926 Scottish First Division	Hearts	6–1	Morton	Tynecastle Park
				Attendance: 11,500

20 March 1926 Scottish First Division	Kilmarnock	5–1	Hearts	Rugby Park
				Attendance: 8,000

27 March 1926 Scottish First Division	Hearts	2–2	Dundee	Tynecastle Park
				Attendance: 10,000

3 April 1926 Scottish First Division	Hearts	5–1	Raith Rovers	Tynecastle Park
				Attendance: 10,000

17 April 1926 Scottish First Division	Clydebank	1–5	Hearts	Clydeholm Park
				Attendance: 4,000

24 April 1926 Scottish First Division	Partick Thistle	1–4	Hearts	Tynecastle Park
				Attendance: 15,000

== See also ==
- List of Heart of Midlothian F.C. seasons
