= 1919–20 Celtic F.C. season =

Celtic
1919–20 season
- Manager: Willie Maley
- Stadium: Celtic Park
- Scottish First Division: 2nd
- Scottish Cup: 4th Round

The 1919–20 Scottish football season was Celtic's 32nd season of competitive football, in which they competed in the Scottish Football League and the Scottish Cup.

Celtic finished their league campaign runners-up, three points below Rangers in the table. In the Scottish Cup, which was played for the first time since 1913-14, Celtic failed to retain the trophy as they lost in the fourth round to Rangers away, 1-0.

Celtic won both the Glasgow Cup and the Glasgow Charity Cup this season, defeating Partick Thistle and Queen's Park respectively 1-0 in both finals at Hampden Park.

== Competitions ==
=== Scottish First Division ===
==== League table ====
| Pos | Team | Pld | W | D | L | GF | GA | GD | Pts |
|---|---|---|---|---|---|---|---|---|---|
| 1 | Rangers | 42 | 31 | 9 | 2 | 106 | 25 | +81 | 71 |
| 2 | Celtic | 42 | 29 | 10 | 3 | 89 | 31 | +58 | 68 |
| 3 | Motherwell | 42 | 23 | 11 | 8 | 74 | 53 | +21 | 57 |
| 4 | Dundee | 42 | 22 | 6 | 14 | 79 | 65 | +14 | 50 |
| 5 | Clydebank | 42 | 20 | 8 | 14 | 79 | 65 | +14 | 48 |

Source: "1919-1920 SFL - SPFL Archive". SPFL.

==== Matches ====
| 16 August 1919 First Division | Celtic | 3–1 | Clydebank | Glasgow |
| | | | | Stadium: Celtic Park; Attendance: 12,000 |

| 18 August 1919 First Division | Celtic | 3–1 | Dumbarton | Glasgow |
| | | | | Stadium: Celtic Park; Attendance: 6,000 |

| 23 August 1919 First Division | Hamilton Academical | 1–2 | Celtic | Hamilton |
| | | | | Stadium: Douglas Park; Attendance: 12,000 |

| 27 August 1919 First Division | Celtic | 1–0 | Kilmarnock | Glasgow |
| | | | | Stadium: Celtic Park; Attendance: 10,000 |

| 30 August 1919 First Division | Celtic | 3–0 | Raith Rovers | Glasgow |
| | | | | Stadium: Celtic Park; Attendance: 10,000 |

| 13 September 1919 First Division | Hearts | 0–1 | Celtic | Edinburgh |
| | | | | Stadium: Tynecastle Park; Attendance: 40,700 |

| 27 September 1919 First Division | Celtic | 3–1 | Clyde | Glasgow |
| | | | | Stadium: Celtic Park; Attendance: 20,000 |

| 29 September 1919 First Division | Third Lanark | 1–4 | Celtic | Glasgow |
| | | | | Stadium: Cathkin Park; Attendance: 15,000 |

| 11 October 1919 First Division | Celtic | 7–3 | Hibernian | Glasgow |
| | | | | Stadium: Celtic Park; Attendance: 12,000 |

| 18 October 1919 First Division | Rangers | 3–0 | Celtic | Glasgow |
| | | | | Stadium: Ibrox Park; Attendance: 76,000 |

| 25 October 1919 First Division | Celtic | 3–1 | Queen's Park | Glasgow |
| | | | | Stadium: Celtic Park; Attendance: 20,000 |

| 1 November 1919 First Division | Morton | 1–2 | Celtic | Greenock |
| | | | | Stadium: Cappielow Park; Attendance: 21,000 |

| 8 November 1919 First Division | Celtic | 1–1 | Falkirk | Glasgow |
| | | | | Stadium: Celtic Park; Attendance: 14,000 |

| 15 November 1919 First Division | Ayr United | 1–1 | Celtic | Ayr |
| | | | | Stadium: Somerset Park; Attendance: 12,000 |

| 22 November 1919 First Division | Celtic | 0–0 | Partick Thistle | Glasgow |
| | | | | Stadium: Celtic Park; Attendance: 25,000 |

| 29 November 1919 First Division | Aberdeen | 0–1 | Celtic | Aberdeen |
| | | | | Stadium: Pittodrie Park; Attendance: 25,000 |

| 6 December 1919 First Division | Celtic | 5–0 | Motherwell | Glasgow |
| | | | | Stadium: Celtic Park; Attendance: 20,000 |

| 13 December 1919 First Division | Airdrieonians | 0–0 | Celtic | Airdrie |
| | | | | Stadium: Broomfield Park; Attendance: 12,000 |

| 20 December 1919 First Division | Dumbarton | 0–0 | Celtic | Dumbarton |
| | | | | Stadium: Boghead Park; Attendance: 12,000 |

| 27 December 1919 First Division | Celtic | 2–1 | Third Lanark | Glasgow |
| | | | | Stadium: Celtic Park; Attendance: 12,000 |

| 1 January 1920 First Division | Celtic | 1–1 | Rangers | Glasgow |
| | | | | Stadium: Celtic Park; Attendance: 80,000 |

| 3 January 1920 First Division | Raith Rovers | 0–3 | Celtic | Kirkcaldy |
| | | | | Stadium: Stark's Park; Attendance: 15,000 |

| 5 January 1920 First Division | Clyde | 0–2 | Celtic | Glasgow |
| | | | | Stadium: Shawfield Stadium; Attendance: 20,000 |

| 10 January 1920 First Division | Celtic | 1–1 | Morton | Glasgow |
| | | | | Stadium: Celtic Park; Attendance: 25,000 |

| 17 January 1920 First Division | Kilmarnock | 2–3 | Celtic | Kilmarnock |
| | | | | Stadium: Rugby Park; Attendance: 10,000 |

| 24 January 1920 First Division | Clydebank | 2–0 | Celtic | Clydebank |
| | | | | Stadium: Clydeholm Park; Attendance: 10,000 |

| 31 January 1920 First Division | Dundee | 2–1 | Celtic | Dundee |
| | | | | Stadium: Dens Park; Attendance: 18,000 |

| 14 February 1920 First Division | Celtic | 3–0 | Albion Rovers | Glasgow |
| | | | | Stadium: Celtic Park |

| 28 February 1920 First Division | Celtic | 2–0 | Hamilton Academical | Glasgow |
| | | | | Stadium: Celtic Park; Attendance: 15,000 |

| 13 March 1920 First Division | Queen's Park | 1–2 | Celtic | Glasgow |
| | | | | Stadium: Hampden Park; Attendance: 25,000 |

| 27 March 1920 First Division | Falkirk | 1–2 | Celtic | Falkirk |
| | | | | Stadium: Brockville Park; Attendance: 12,000 |

| 3 April 1920 First Division | St Mirren | 0–2 | Celtic | Paisley |
| | | | | Stadium: St Mirren Park, Love Street; Attendance: 16,000 |

| 5 April 1920 First Division | Partick Thistle | 1–2 | Celtic | Glasgow |
| | | | | Stadium: Firhill Park; Attendance: 28,000 |

| 10 April 1920 First Division | Celtic | 5–0 | Aberdeen | Glasgow |
| | | | | Stadium: Celtic Park; Attendance: 12,000 |

| 14 April 1920 First Division | Albion Rovers | 0–5 | Celtic | Coatbridge |
| | | | | Stadium: Cliftonhill; Attendance: 11,000 |

| 17 April 1920 First Division | Motherwell | 0–0 | Celtic | Motherwell |
| | | | | Stadium: Fir Park; Attendance: 23,750 |

| 19 April 1920 First Division | Hibernian | 1–2 | Celtic | Edinburgh |
| | | | | Stadium: Easter Road; Attendance: 20,000 |

| 22 April 1920 First Division | Celtic | 2–2 | St Mirren | Glasgow |
| | | | | Stadium: Celtic Park; Attendance: 10,000 |

| 24 April 1920 First Division | Celtic | 4–0 | Ayr United | Glasgow |
| | | | | Stadium: Celtic Park; Attendance: 12,000 |

| 26 April 1920 First Division | Celtic | 1–1 | Dundee | Glasgow |
| | | | | Stadium: Celtic Park; Attendance: 7,000 |

| 28 April 1920 First Division | Celtic | 1–0 | Airdrieonians | Glasgow |
| | | | | Stadium: Celtic Park; Attendance: 7,000 |

| 1 May 1920 First Division | Celtic | 3–0 | Hearts | Glasgow |
| | | | | Stadium: Celtic Park; Attendance: 8,000 |

=== Scottish Cup ===
| 7 February 1920 Second round | Dundee | 1–3 | Celtic | Dundee |
| | | | | Stadium: Dens Park; Attendance: 34,000 |

| 21 February 1920 Third round | Celtic | 2–0 | Partick Thistle | Glasgow |
| | | | | Stadium: Celtic Park; Attendance: 65,000 |

| 6 March 1920 Fourth round | Rangers | 1–0 | Celtic | Glasgow |
| | | | | Stadium: Ibrox Park; Attendance: 98,466 |
