= 1920–21 Celtic F.C. season =

Celtic
1920–21 season
- Manager: Willie Maley
- Stadium: Celtic Park
- Scottish Football League: 2nd
- Scottish Cup: 4th Round

The 1920–21 Scottish football season was Celtic's 33rd season of competitive football, in which they competed in the Scottish Football League and the Scottish Cup. Celtic ended the league campaign a distant second to fellow Glasgow team Rangers, ten points behind. In the cup, they lost 1-2 to Hearts in the fourth round (quarter-finals).

== Competitions ==
=== Scottish Football League ===
==== League table ====
Pos	Team	Pld	W	D	L	GF	GA	GD	Pts
1	Rangers	42	35	6	1	91	24	+67	76
2	Celtic	42	30	6	6	89	31	+58	66
3	Heart of Midlothian	42	20	10	12	74	49	+25	50
4	Dundee	42	19	11	12	54	48	+6	49
5	Motherwell	42	19	10	13	75	51	+24	48

==== Matches ====
18 August 1920 First Division	Hamilton Academical	1–1	Celtic	Hamilton
				Stadium: Douglas Park; Attendance: 12,000

21 August 1920 First Division	Albion Rovers	0–1	Celtic	Coatbridge
				Stadium: Cliftonhill; Attendance: 17,000

28 August 1920 First Division	Aberdeen	1–2	Celtic	Aberdeen
				Stadium: Pittodrie Park; Attendance: 23,566

1 September 1920 First Division	Celtic	1–1	Morton	Glasgow
				Stadium: Celtic Park; Attendance: 15,000

7 September 1920 First Division	Celtic	1–0	Motherwell	Glasgow
				Stadium: Celtic Park; Attendance: 20,000

11 September 1920 First Division	Celtic	2–1	Hamilton Academical	Glasgow
				Stadium: Celtic Park; Attendance: 15,000

20 September 1920 First Division	Hibernian	0–3	Celtic	Edinburgh
				Stadium: Easter Road; Attendance: 20,000

25 September 1920 First Division	Celtic	3–1	Ayr United	Glasgow
				Stadium: Celtic Park; Attendance: 8,000

27 September 1920 First Division	Celtic	3–0	Third Lanark	Glasgow
				Stadium: Celtic Park; Attendance: 12,000

9 October 1920 First Division	Celtic	5–1	Queen's Park	Glasgow
				Stadium: Celtic Park; Attendance: 14,000

12 October 1920 First Division	Celtic	4–1	Falkirk	Glasgow
				Stadium: Celtic Park; Attendance: 10,000

16 October 1920 First Division	Dundee	1–2	Celtic	Dundee
				Stadium: Dens Park; Attendance: 32,000

23 October 1920 First Division	Celtic	1–2	Rangers	Glasgow
				Stadium: Celtic Park; Attendance: 65,269

26 October 1920 First Division	Celtic	0–2	Albion Rovers	Glasgow
				Stadium: Celtic Park; Attendance: 10,000

30 October 1920 First Division	Hearts	0–1	Celtic	Edinburgh
				Stadium: Tynecastle Park; Attendance: 36,500

6 November 1920 First Division	Dumbarton	1–3	Celtic	Dumbarton
				Stadium: Boghead Park; Attendance: 10,000

13 November 1920 First Division	Celtic	2–0	Kilmarnock	Glasgow
				Stadium: Celtic Park; Attendance: 12,000

20 November 1920 First Division	Clyde	2–1	Celtic	Glasgow
				Stadium: Shawfield Stadium; Attendance: 30,000

27 November 1920 First Division	Celtic	5–0	Raith Rovers	Glasgow
				Stadium: Celtic Park; Attendance: 8,000

4 December 1920 First Division	Falkirk	1–3	Celtic	Falkirk
				Stadium: Brockville Park; Attendance: 9,000

11 December 1920 First Division	Celtic	1–0	Partick Thistle	Glasgow
				Stadium: Celtic Park; Attendance: 28,000

18 December 1920 First Division	Celtic	2–1	Airdrieonians	Glasgow
				Stadium: Celtic Park; Attendance: 20,000

25 December 1920 First Division	St Mirren	0–2	Celtic	Paisley
				Stadium: St Mirren Park, Love Street; Attendance: 12,000

1 January 1921 First Division	Rangers	0–2	Celtic	Glasgow
				Stadium: Ibrox Park; Attendance: 69,260

3 January 1921 First Division	Celtic	1–0	Clyde	Glasgow
				Stadium: Celtic Park; Attendance: 25,000

8 January 1921 First Division	Clydebank	0–2	Celtic	Clydebank
				Stadium: Clydeholm Park; Attendance: 12,000

15 January 1921 First Division	Morton	1–1	Celtic	Greenock
				Stadium: Cappielow Park; Attendance: 16,000

22 January 1921 First Division	Motherwell	1–1	Celtic	Motherwell
				Stadium: Fir Park; Attendance: 15,000

29 January 1921 First Division	Celtic	3–1	Aberdeen	Glasgow
				Stadium: Celtic Park; Attendance: 15,000

12 February 1921 First Division	Celtic	6–0	St Mirren	Glasgow
				Stadium: Celtic Park; Attendance: 15,000

23 February 1921 First Division	Third Lanark	1–2	Celtic	Glasgow
				Stadium: Cathkin Park; Attendance: 12,000

26 February 1921 First Division	Queen's Park	0–2	Celtic	Glasgow
				Stadium: Hampden Park; Attendance: 12,000

9 March 1921 First Division	Celtic	2–0	Dundee	Glasgow
				Stadium: Celtic Park; Attendance: 10,000

12 March 1921 First Division	Ayr United	3–1	Celtic	Ayr
				Stadium: Somerset Park; Attendance: 7,000

19 March 1921 First Division	Celtic	3–2	Hearts	Glasgow
				Stadium: Celtic Park; Attendance: 16,000

26 March 1921 First Division	Kilmarnock	3–2	Celtic	Kilmarnock
				Stadium: Rugby Park; Attendance: 12,000

28 March 1921 First Division	Partick Thistle	0–1	Celtic	Glasgow
				Stadium: Firhill Park; Attendance: 10,000

2 April 1921 First Division	Celtic	1–1	Dumbarton	Glasgow
				Stadium: Celtic Park; Attendance: 10,000

9 April 1921 First Division	Raith Rovers	2–0	Celtic	Kirkcaldy
				Stadium: Stark's Park; Attendance: 9,000

20 April 1921 First Division	Celtic	1–1	Clydebank	Glasgow
				Stadium: Celtic Park; Attendance: 4,000

23 April 1921 First Division	Celtic	3–0	Hibernian	Glasgow
				Stadium: Celtic Park; Attendance: 20,000

30 April 1921 First Division	Airdrieonians	2–3	Celtic	Airdrie
				Stadium: Broomfield Park; Attendance: 6,000

=== Scottish Cup ===
5 February 1921 Second round	Vale of Leven	0–3	Celtic	Alexandria
				Stadium: Millburn Park; Attendance: 3,000

19 February 1921 Third round	East Fife	1–3	Celtic	Methil
				Stadium: Bayview Park; Attendance: 11,000

5 March 1921 Fourth round	Celtic	1–2	Hearts	Glasgow
				Stadium: Celtic Park; Attendance: 37,000
