= 1930–31 Dundee United F.C. season =

Dundee United
1930–31 season
- Manager: Jimmy Brownlie
- Stadium: Tannadice Park
- Scottish Football League First Division: 2nd W21 D8 L9 F93 A54 P50
- Scottish Cup: Round 2

The 1930–31 season was the 26th year of football played by Dundee United, and covers the period from 1 July 1930 to 30 June 1931.

== Match results ==
Dundee United played a total of 44 matches during the 1930–31 season.

=== Legend ===
Win
Draw
Loss

All results are written with Dundee United's score first. Own goals in italics

=== Second Division ===
Date	Opponent	Venue	Result	Attendance	Scorers
9 August 1930	Armadale	A	4–1	1,500	
16 August 1930	Alloa Athletic	H	1–1	8,000	
23 August 1930	Stenhousemuir	A	1–0	1,500	
30 August 1930	Montrose	H	4–1	8,000	
6 September 1930	Forfar Athletic	A	2–2	3,000	
13 September 1930	Third Lanark	H	1–2	5,000	
20 September 1930	St Johnstone	A	0–2	4,000	
27 September 1930	Clydebank	H	5–2	2,000	
4 October 1930	East Stirlingshire	A	1–3	2,000	
11 October 1930	Raith Roves	H	1–2	3,000	
18 October 1930	Brechin City	A	4–2	2,000	
25 October 1930	Queen of the South	H	5–2	3,000	
1 November 1930	Dumbarton	A	1–4	3,000	
8 November 1930	Arbroath	H	4–0	5,000	
15 November 1930	St Bernard's	H	5–3	3,000	
29 November 1930	King's Park	H	2–0	3,000	
6 December 1930	Bo'ness	A	3–1	1,000	
13 December 1930	Dunfermline Athletic	A	4–4	3,000	
20 December 1930	Armadale	H	4–0	1,200	
27 December 1930	Alloa Athletic	A	4–1	2,000	
1 January 1931	St Johnstone	H	1–1	10,000	
3 January 1931	Stenhousemuir	H	5–2	6,000	
10 January 1931	Montrose	A	1–2	2,500	
24 January 1931	Forfar Athletic	H	4–3	8,000	
7 February 1931	East Stirlingshire	H	1–1	2,000	
10 February 1931	Third Lanark	A	0–4	4,000	
14 February 1931	Raith Rovers	A	0–0	3,000	
21 February 1931	Brechin City	H	6–0	6,000	
28 February 1931	Queen of the South	A	0–0	2,000	
7 March 1931	Dumbarton	H	1–1	3,000	
18 March 1931	Albion Rovers	A	5–0	1,000	
21 March 1931	St Bernard's	A	1–2	2,000	
4 April 1931	Albion Rovers	H	4–0	3,000	
6 April 1931	Clydebank	A	2–1	2,000	
11 April 1931	King's Park	A	3–1	2,000	
13 April 1931	Arbroath	A	2–1	2,000	
18 April 1931	Bo'ness	H	0–1	2,500	
25 April 1931	Dunfermnline Athletic	H	2–1	7,000	

=== Scottish Cup ===
Date	Rd	Opponent	Venue	Result	Attendance	Scorers
17 January 1931	R1	Nithsdale Wanderers	H	14–0	1,000	
4 February 1931	R2	Celtic	H	2–3	13,000	
