= 1925–26 Celtic F.C. season =

Celtic
1925–26 season
- Chairman: Thomas White
- Manager: Willie Maley
- Stadium: Celtic Park
- Scottish First Division: 1st
- Scottish Cup: Finalists

The 1925–26 Scottish football season was Celtic's 38th season of competitive football, in which they competed in the Scottish First Division and the Scottish Cup.

In the league, Celtic showed great form at Celtic Park, being the only team not to lose a single game at home (15 wins and 4 draws). This, paired with a strong away form (10 wins, 4 draws, 5 losses) allowed them to win the league eight points clear of both third placed Hearts and second placed Airdrieonians, who ended runners-up for the fourth season in a row.

This was Celtic's 17th league trophy, as well as their 28th major national honour, both Scottish records at the time. It would be the last time Celtic won the league until 1936, a nine-season dry spell.

However, the club narrowly missed on what would have been their fourth League and Cup double as they lost the Scottish Cup final 2-0 to St. Mirren, who won their first ever major honour.

== Competitions ==
=== Scottish First Division ===
==== League table ====
Pos	Team	Pld	W	D	L	GF	GA	GD	Pts
1	Celtic	38	25	8	5	97	40	+57	58
2	Airdrieonians	38	23	4	11	95	54	+41	50
3	Heart of Midlothian	38	21	8	9	87	56	+31	50
4	St Mirren	38	20	7	11	63	52	+11	47
5	Motherwell	38	19	8	11	67	46	+21	46

Source: "1925-1926 Division 1 - SPFL Archive". SPFL.

==== Matches ====
15 August 1925 First Division	Celtic	5–0	Hibernian	Glasgow
				Stadium: Celtic Park; Attendance: 22,000

22 August 1925 First Division	Clydebank	1–2	Celtic	Clydebank
				Stadium: Clydeholm Park; Attendance: 23,193

29 August 1925 First Division	Celtic	2–0	Hamilton Academical	Glasgow
				Stadium: Celtic Park; Attendance: 16,000

12 September 1925 First Division	Celtic	6–1	Cowdenbeath	Glasgow
				Stadium: Celtic Park; Attendance: 12,000

19 September 1925 First Division	Dundee United	1–0	Celtic	Dundee
				Stadium: Tannadice Park; Attendance: 17,000

26 September 1925 First Division	Celtic	3–1	Falkirk	Glasgow
				Stadium: Celtic Park; Attendance: 10,000

3 October 1925 First Division	Airdrieonians	5–1	Celtic	Airdrie
				Stadium: Broomfield Park; Attendance: 23,000

13 October 1925 First Division	Celtic	4–1	Queen's Park	Glasgow
				Stadium: Celtic Park; Attendance: 5,000

17 October 1925 First Division	Rangers	1–0	Celtic	Glasgow
				Stadium: Celtic Park; Attendance: 45,000

24 October 1925 First Division	Morton	0–5	Celtic	Greenock
				Stadium: Cappielow Park; Attendance: 10,000

31 October 1925 First Division	Celtic	0–0	Dundee	Glasgow
				Stadium: Celtic Park; Attendance: 12,000

7 November 1925 First Division	Aberdeen	2–4	Celtic	Aberdeen
				Stadium: Pittodrie Park; Attendance: 21,000

14 November 1925 First Division	Raith Rovers	1–2	Celtic	Kirkcaldy
				Stadium: Starks Park; Attendance: 8,000

25 November 1925 First Division	Celtic	3–0	Hearts	Glasgow
				Stadium: Celtic Park; Attendance: 7,000

28 November 1925 First Division	St Johnstone	0–3	Celtic	Perth
				Stadium: Muirton Park; Attendance: 8,000

5 December 1925 First Division	Celtic	1–1	Clydebank	Glasgow
				Stadium: Celtic Park; Attendance: 12,000

12 December 1925 First Division	St Mirren	0–2	Celtic	Paisley
				Stadium: St Mirren Park, Love Street; Attendance: 22,000

19 December 1925 First Division	Celtic	3–2	Airdrieonians	Glasgow
				Stadium: Celtic Park; Attendance: 22,000

26 December 1925 First Division	Cowdenbeath	1–1	Celtic	Cowdenbeath
				Stadium: Central Park; Attendance: 8,000

1 January 1926 First Division	Celtic	2–2	Rangers	Glasgow
				Stadium: Celtic Park; Attendance: 57,000

2 January 1926 First Division	Queen's Park	1–4	Celtic	Glasgow
				Stadium: Hampden Park; Attendance: 20,000

4 January 1926 First Division	Celtic	3–0	Partick Thistle	Glasgow
				Stadium: Celtic Park; Attendance: 17,000

9 January 1926 First Division	Celtic	1–0	Raith Rovers	Glasgow
				Stadium: Celtic Park; Attendance: 6,000

16 January 1926 First Division	Hibernian	4–4	Celtic	Edinburgh
				Stadium: Easter Road; Attendance: 25,000

30 January 1926 First Division	Celtic	3–1	Motherwell	Glasgow
				Stadium: Celtic Park; Attendance: 10,000

10 February 1926 First Division	Kilmarnock	2–1	Celtic	Kilmarnock
				Stadium: Rugby Park; Attendance: 8,000

13 February 1926 First Division	Falkirk	1–1	Celtic	Falkirk
				Stadium: Brockville Park; Attendance: 15,000

3 March 1926 First Division	Hearts	1–2	Celtic	Edinburgh
				Stadium: Tynecastle Park; Attendance: 14,500

9 March 1926 First Division	Celtic	6–1	St Mirren	Glasgow
				Stadium: Celtic Park; Attendance: 10,000

17 March 1926 First Division	Dundee	1–2	Celtic	Dundee
				Stadium: Dens Park; Attendance: 12,000

23 March 1926 First Division	Celtic	4–1	St Johnstone	Glasgow
				Stadium: Celtic Park; Attendance: 6,000

27 March 1926 First Division	Motherwell	2–1	Celtic	Motherwell
				Stadium: Fir Park; Attendance: 16,000

30 March 1926 First Division	Celtic	4–1	Aberdeen	Glasgow
				Stadium: Celtic Park; Attendance: 5,000

3 April 1926 First Division	Celtic	0–0	Kilmarnock	Glasgow
				Stadium: Celtic Park; Attendance: 12,000

5 April 1926 First Division	Partick Thistle	0–0	Celtic	Glasgow
				Stadium: Firhill Park; Attendance: 25,000

14 April 1926 First Division	Celtic	3–1	Morton	Glasgow
				Stadium: Celtic Park; Attendance: 5,000

17 April 1926 First Division	Hamilton Academical	1–3	Celtic	Hamilton
				Stadium: Douglas Park; Attendance: 6,000

24 April 1926 First Division	Celtic	6–2	Dundee United	Glasgow
				Stadium: Celtic Park; Attendance: 5,000

=== Scottish Cup ===
23 January 1926 First round	Kilmarnock	0–5	Celtic	Kilmarnock
				Stadium: Rugby Park; Attendance: 24,174

6 February 1926 Second round	Celtic	4–0	Hamilton Academical	Glasgow
				Stadium: Celtic Park; Attendance: 28,000

20 February 1926 Third round	Heart of Midlothian	0–4	Celtic	Edinburgh
				Stadium: Tynecastle Park; Attendance: 52,000

6 March 1926 Fourth round	Celtic	6–1	Dumbarton	Glasgow
				Stadium: Celtic Park; Attendance: 19,000

20 March 1926 Semi-final	Aberdeen	1–2	Celtic	Edinburgh
				Stadium: Tynecastle Park; Attendance: 24,000

10 April 1926 Final	Celtic	0–2	St Mirren	Glasgow
				Stadium: Hampden Park; Attendance: 98,620
