= 1921–22 Celtic F.C. season =

Celtic
1921–22 season
- Manager: Willie Maley
- Stadium: Celtic Park
- Scottish First Division: 1st
- Scottish Cup: 3rd Round

The 1921–22 Scottish football season was Celtic's 34th season of competitive football, in which they competed in the Scottish First Division and the Scottish Cup.

In the league, Celtic prevailed by a single point over Rangers, the third time in five seasons that the league was decided by a single point between the two teams. It was Celtic's 16th league title and their 25th major domestic honour.

In the Scottish Cup, they lost a home draw to Hamilton Academical in the third round, 1-3.

== Competitions ==
=== Scottish First Division ===
==== League table ====
| Pos | Team | Pld | W | D | L | GF | GA | GD | Pts |
|---|---|---|---|---|---|---|---|---|---|
| 1 | Celtic | 42 | 27 | 13 | 2 | 83 | 20 | +63 | 67 |
| 2 | Rangers | 42 | 28 | 10 | 4 | 83 | 26 | +57 | 66 |
| 3 | Raith Rovers | 42 | 19 | 13 | 10 | 66 | 43 | +23 | 51 |
| 4 | Dundee | 42 | 19 | 11 | 12 | 57 | 40 | +17 | 49 |
| 5 | Falkirk | 42 | 16 | 17 | 9 | 48 | 38 | +10 | 49 |

Source: "1921-1922 Division 1 - SPFL Archive". SPFL.

==== Matches ====
| 15 August 1921 First Division | Celtic | 4–0 | Raith Rovers | Glasgow |
| | | | | Stadium: Celtic Park; Attendance: 15,000 |

| 20 August 1921 First Division | Celtic | 3–1 | Hamilton Academical | Glasgow |
| | | | | Stadium: Celtic Park; Attendance: 25,000 |

| 24 August 1921 First Division | Airdrieonians | 0–2 | Celtic | Airdrie |
| | | | | Stadium: Broomfield Park; Attendance: 12,000 |

| 27 August 1921 First Division | Raith Rovers | 1–1 | Celtic | Kirkcaldy |
| | | | | Stadium: Stark's Park; Attendance: 16,495 |

| 6 September 1921 First Division | Celtic | 4–0 | Dumbarton | Glasgow |
| | | | | Stadium: Celtic Park; Attendance: 10,000 |

| 10 September 1921 First Division | Aberdeen | 1–1 | Celtic | Aberdeen |
| | | | | Stadium: Pittodrie Park; Attendance: 21,000 |

| 19 September 1921 First Division | Hibernian | 2–1 | Celtic | Edinburgh |
| | | | | Stadium: Easter Road; Attendance: 16,000 |

| 24 September 1921 First Division | Dumbarton | 0–5 | Celtic | Dumbarton |
| | | | | Stadium: Boghead Park; Attendance: 10,000 |

| 26 September 1921 First Division | Celtic | 1–0 | Morton | Glasgow |
| | | | | Stadium: Celtic Park; Attendance: 15,000 |

| 4 October 1921 First Division | Celtic | 2–0 | St Mirren | Glasgow |
| | | | | Stadium: Celtic Park; Attendance: 12,000 |

| 8 October 1921 First Division | Dundee | 0–0 | Celtic | Dundee |
| | | | | Stadium: Dens Park; Attendance: 26,000 |

| 15 October 1921 First Division | Celtic | 3–1 | Albion Rovers | Glasgow |
| | | | | Stadium: Celtic Park; Attendance: 16,000 |

| 22 October 1921 First Division | Rangers | 1–1 | Celtic | Glasgow |
| | | | | Stadium: Ibrox Park; Attendance: 50,000 |

| 29 October 1921 First Division | Celtic | 2–1 | Ayr United | Glasgow |
| | | | | Stadium: Celtic Park; Attendance: 9,000 |

| 5 November 1921 First Division | Celtic | 3–0 | Hearts | Glasgow |
| | | | | Stadium: Celtic Park; Attendance: 20,000 |

| 12 November 1921 First Division | Kilmarnock | 4–3 | Celtic | Kilmarnock |
| | | | | Stadium: Rugby Park; Attendance: 10,000 |

| 19 November 1921 First Division | Celtic | 3–1 | Queen's Park | Glasgow |
| | | | | Stadium: Celtic Park; Attendance: 7,000 |

| 26 November 1921 First Division | Motherwell | 1–1 | Celtic | Motherwell |
| | | | | Stadium: Fir Park; Attendance: 26,000 |

| 3 December 1921 First Division | Celtic | 1–0 | Airdrieonians | Glasgow |
| | | | | Stadium: Celtic Park; Attendance: 10,000 |

| 10 December 1921 First Division | Ayr United | 0–0 | Celtic | Ayr |
| | | | | Stadium: Somerset Park; Attendance: 9,000 |

| 17 December 1921 First Division | Celtic | 6–0 | Clydebank | Glasgow |
| | | | | Stadium: Celtic Park; Attendance: 4,000 |

| 24 December 1921 First Division | Celtic | 0–0 | Falkirk | Glasgow |
| | | | | Stadium: Celtic Park; Attendance: 14,000 |

| 31 December 1921 First Division | Hanmilton Academical | 1–3 | Celtic | Hamilton |
| | | | | Stadium: Douglas Park; Attendance: 12,000 |

| 2 January 1922 First Division | Celtic | 0–0 | Rangers | Glasgow |
| | | | | Stadium: Celtic Park; Attendance: 60,000 |

| 3 January 1922 First Division | Clyde | 1–1 | Celtic | Glasgow |
| | | | | Stadium: Shawfield Stadium; Attendance: 20,000 |

| 7 January 1922 First Division | Celtic | 2–0 | Third Lanark | Glasgow |
| | | | | Stadium: Celtic Park; Attendance: 10,000 |

| 14 January 1922 First Division | Clydebank | 0–2 | Celtic | Clydebank |
| | | | | Stadium: Clydeholm Park; Attendance: 9,000 |

| 21 January 1922 First Division | Celtic | 2–0 | Aberdeen | Glasgow |
| | | | | Stadium: Celtic Park; Attendance: 12,000 |

| 4 February 1922 First Division | Partick Thistle | 0–0 | Celtic | Glasgow |
| | | | | Stadium: Firhill Park; Attendance: 20,000 |

| 14 February 1922 First Division | St Mirren | 0–2 | Celtic | Paisley |
| | | | | Stadium: St Mirren Park, Love Street; Attendance: 15,000 |

| 18 February 1922 First Division | Celtic | 1–0 | Clyde | Glasgow |
| | | | | Stadium: Celtic Park; Attendance: 10,000 |

| 1 March 1922 First Division | Celtic | 4–0 | Hamilton Academical | Glasgow |
| | | | | Stadium: Celtic Park; Attendance: 10,000 |

| 4 March 1922 First Division | Third Lanark | 0–0 | Celtic | Glasgow |
| | | | | Stadium: Cathkin Park; Attendance: 12,000 |

| 11 March 1922 First Division | Celtic | 1–0 | Kilmarnock | Glasgow |
| | | | | Stadium: Celtic Park; Attendance: 6,000 |

| 15 March 1922 First Division | Celtic | 2–0 | Motherwell | Glasgow |
| | | | | Stadium: Celtic Park; Attendance: 8,000 |

| 18 March 1922 First Division | Falkirk | 1–1 | Celtic | Falkirk |
| | | | | Stadium: Brockville Park; Attendance: 19,000 |

| 25 March 1922 First Division | Heart of Midlothian | 1–2 | Celtic | Edinburgh |
| | | | | Stadium: Tynecastle Park; Attendance: 26,000 |

| 1 April 1922 First Division | Queen's Park | 1–3 | Celtic | Glasgow |
| | | | | Stadium: Hampden Park; Attendance: 25,000 |

| 8 April 1922 First Division | Celtic | 4–0 | Dundee | Glasgow |
| | | | | Stadium: Celtic Park; Attendance: 9,000 |

| 15 April 1922 First Division | Albion Rovers | 0–2 | Celtic | Coatbridge |
| | | | | Stadium: Cliftonhill; Attendance: 11,000 |

| 17 April 1922 First Division | Celtic | 3–0 | Partick Thistle | Glasgow |
| | | | | Stadium: Celtic Park; Attendance: 20,000 |

| 29 April 1922 First Division | Morton | 1–1 | Celtic | Greenock |
| | | | | Stadium: Cappielow Park; Attendance: 23,500 |

=== Scottish Cup ===
| 28 January 1922 First round | Celtic | 4–0 | Montrose | Glasgow |
| | | | | Stadium: Celtic Park; Attendance: 6,000 |

| 11 February 1922 Second round | Third Lanark | 0–1 | Celtic | Glasgow |
| | | | | Stadium: Cathkin Park; Attendance: 42,000 |

| 25 February 1922 Third round | Celtic | 1–3 | Hamilton Academical | Glasgow |
| | | | | Stadium: Celtic Park; Attendance: 20,000 |

== See also ==
- Lord Provost's Rent Relief Cup
