= 1914–15 Scottish Football League =

Scottish football season

Statistics of the Scottish Football League in season 1914–15.

== Scottish League Division One ==
Pos	Team	Pld	W	D	L	GF	GA	GD	Pts
1	Celtic (C)	38	30	5	3	91	25	+66	65
2	Heart of Midlothian	38	27	7	4	83	32	+51	61
3	Rangers	38	23	4	11	74	47	+27	50
4	Morton	38	18	12	8	74	48	+26	48
5	Ayr United	38	20	8	10	55	40	+15	48
6	Falkirk	38	16	7	15	48	48	0	39
7	Partick Thistle	38	15	8	15	56	58	−2	38
8	Hamilton Academical	38	16	6	16	60	55	+5	38
9	St Mirren	38	14	8	16	56	65	−9	36
10	Hibernian	38	12	11	15	59	66	−7	35
11	Airdrieonians	38	14	7	17	54	60	−6	35
12	Dumbarton	38	13	8	17	51	66	−15	34
13	Kilmarnock	38	15	4	19	55	59	−4	34
14	Dundee	38	12	9	17	43	61	−18	33
15	Aberdeen	38	11	11	16	39	52	−13	33
16	Third Lanark	38	10	12	16	51	57	−6	32
17	Clyde	38	12	6	20	44	59	−15	30
18	Motherwell	38	10	10	18	49	66	−17	30
19	Raith Rovers	38	9	10	19	53	68	−15	28
20	Queen's Park	38	4	5	29	27	90	−63	13

(C) Champions

== Scottish League Division Two ==
Pos	Team	Pld	W	D	L	GF	GA	GD	Pts	Qualification
1	Cowdenbeath (C)	26	16	5	5	49	17	+32	37 (Note: Cowdenbeath, Leith Athletic and St Bernard's finished level on points. A round-robin tournament to determine the champion was won by Cowdenbeath.)	
2	Leith Athletic	26	15	7	4	54	31	+23	37	
3	St Bernard's	26	18	1	7	66	34	+32	37	
4	East Stirlingshire	26	13	5	8	53	44	+9	31	
5	Clydebank	26	13	4	9	67	37	+30	30	Joined the 1917–18 Scottish Division One
6	Dunfermline Athletic	26	13	2	11	49	39	+10	28	
7	Johnstone	26	11	5	10	41	52	−11	27	
8	St Johnstone	26	10	6	10	56	53	+3	26	
9	Albion Rovers	26	9	7	10	37	42	−5	25	Joined the 1920–21 Scottish Division One
10	Lochgelly United	26	9	3	14	43	60	−17	21	
11	Dundee Hibernian	26	8	3	15	48	61	−13	19	
12	Abercorn	26	5	7	14	35	65	−30	17	
13	Arthurlie	26	6	4	16	36	66	−30	16	
14	Vale of Leven	26	4	5	17	33	66	−33	13	

Source: statto.com
Rules for classification: Teams finish equal if level on points. Points system: 2 points for a win, 1 point for a draw, 0 points for a loss
(C) Champions

== See also ==
- 1914–15 in Scottish football
