= 1917–18 Celtic F.C. season =

Celtic
1917–18 season
- Manager: Willie Maley
- Stadium: Celtic Park
- Scottish First Division: 2nd

The 1917–18 Scottish football season was Celtic's 30th season of competitive football, in which they competed in the Scottish First Division. After having won the previous four championships, they narrowly failed to defend their league title as they finished runners-up just one point below Rangers. Both teams were tied on points on the last day, but Celtic drew home to Motherwell, 1-1; and Rangers won 2–1 home against Clyde.

For the fourth consecutive season, the Scottish Cup remained suspended because of World War I, so Celtic remained title-holders.

Celtic won the Glasgow Merchants' Charity Cup for the seventh season in a row.

== Competitions ==
=== Scottish First Division ===
==== League table ====
Pos	Team	Pld	W	D	L	GF	GA	GD	Pts
1	Rangers (C)	34	25	6	3	66	24	+42	56
2	Celtic	34	24	7	3	66	26	+40	55
3	Kilmarnock	34	19	5	10	69	41	+28	43
4	Morton	34	17	9	8	53	42	+11	43
5	Motherwell	34	16	9	9	70	51	+19	41

(C) Champions

==== Matches ====
18 August 1917 First Division	Celtic	4–0	Ayr United	Glasgow
				Stadium: Celtic Park; Attendance: 15,000

25 August 1917 First Division	Falkirk	1–3	Celtic	Falkirk
				Stadium: Brockville Park; Attendance: 6,000

1 September 1917 First Division	Celtic	3–2	Clyde	Glasgow
				Stadium: Celtic Park; Attendance: 12,000

15 September 1917 First Division	Celtic	2–1	Partick Thistle	Glasgow
				Stadium: Celtic Park; Attendance: 15,000

24 September 1917 First Division	Third Lanark	0–2	Celtic	Glasgow
				Stadium: Cathkin Park; Attendance: 14,000

29 September 1917 First Division	Hearts	0–1	Celtic	Edinburgh
				Stadium: Tynecastle Park; Attendance: 15,000

13 October 1917 First Division	Celtic	2–3	Kilmarnock	Glasgow
				Stadium: Celtic Park; Attendance: 18,000

20 October 1917 First Division	Rangers	1–2	Celtic	Glasgow
				Stadium: Ibrox Park; Attendance: 45,000

27 October 1917 First Division	Celtic	3–0	Queen's Park	Glasgow
				Stadium: Celtic Park; Attendance: 8,000

3 November 1917 First Division	Airdrieonians	2–0	Celtic	Airdrie
				Stadium: Broomfield Park; Attendance: 12,000

10 November 1917 First Division	Celtic	1–0	Hamilton Academical	Glasgow
				Stadium: Celtic Park; Attendance: 6,000

17 November 1917 First Division	Dumbarton	0–2	Celtic	Dumbarton
				Stadium: Boghead Park; Attendance: 7,000

24 November 1917 First Division	Celtic	2–0	Hibernian	Glasgow
				Stadium: Celtic Park; Attendance: 7,000

1 December 1917 First Division	Morton	1–1	Celtic	Greenock
				Stadium: Cappielow Park; Attendance: 12,000

8 December 1917 First Division	Celtic	3–0	Clydebank	Glasgow
				Stadium: Celtic Park; Attendance: 12,000

15 December 1917 First Division	Motherwell	3–4	Celtic	Motherwell
				Stadium: Fir Park; Attendance: 7,000

22 December 1917 First Division	Celtic	3–0	Dumbarton	Glasgow
				Stadium: Celtic Park; Attendance: 8,000

29 December 1917 First Division	Ayr United	1–2	Celtic	Ayr
				Stadium: Somerset Park; Attendance: 3,000

1 January 1918 First Division	Celtic	0–0	Rangers	Glasgow
				Stadium: Celtic Park; Attendance: 55,000

2 January 1918 First Division	Clyde	1–4	Celtic	Glasgow
				Stadium: Shawfield Stadium; Attendance: 12,000

5 January 1918 First Division	St Mirren	0–0	Celtic	Paisley
				Stadium: St Mirren Park, Love Street; Attendance: 13,000

12 January 1918 First Division	Celtic	0–0	Falkirk	Glasgow
				Stadium: Celtic Park; Attendance: 6,000

26 January 1918 First Division	Celtic	3–3	Airdrieonians	Glasgow
				Stadium: Celtic Park; Attendance: 12,000

2 February 1918 First Division	Queen's Park	0–2	Celtic	Glasgow
				Stadium: Hampden Park; Attendance: 15,000

9 February 1918 First Division	Celtic	3–0	Hearts	Glasgow
				Stadium: Celtic Park; Attendance: 6,000

16 February 1918 First Division	Hamilton Academical	1–2	Celtic	Hamilton
				Stadium: Douglas Park; Attendance: 10,000

23 February 1918 First Division	Celtic	2–0	Morton	Glasgow
				Stadium: Celtic Park; Attendance: 20,000

2 March 1918 First Division	Clydebank	1–2	Celtic	Clydebank
				Stadium: Clydeholm Park; Attendance: 16,000

9 March 1918 First Division	Partick Thistle	0–0	Celtic	Glasgow
				Stadium: Firhill Park; Attendance: 30,000

16 March 1918 First Division	Celtic	1–0	St Mirren	Glasgow
				Stadium: Celtic Park; Attendance: 12,000

23 March 1918 First Division	Celtic	1–3	Third Lanark	Glasgow
				Stadium: Celtic Park; Attendance: 14,000

30 March 1918 First Division	Kilmarnock	1–3	Celtic	Kilmarnock
				Stadium: Rugby Park; Attendance: 8,000

6 April 1918 First Division	Hibernian	0–2	Celtic	Edinburgh
				Stadium: Easter Road; Attendance: 11,000

13 April 1918 First Division	Celtic	1–1	Motherwell	Glasgow
				Stadium: Celtic Park; Attendance: 30,000

== See also ==
- Navy and Army War Fund Shield
