= 1916–17 Celtic F.C. season =

Celtic
1916–17 season
- Manager: Willie Maley
- Stadium: Celtic Park
- Scottish First Division: 1st

The 1916–17 Scottish football season was Celtic's 29th season of competitive football, in which they competed in the Scottish First Division. They won the league for the 4th year in a row, by ten points over nearest rival Morton.

The Scottish Cup, which Celtic held as champions, was suspended for the third season in a row because of World War I.

Celtic successfully defended their Glasgow Cup and Glasgow Merchants' Charity Cup trophies as well as the League.

== Competitions ==
=== Scottish First Division ===
==== League table ====
Pos	Team	Pld	W	D	L	GF	GA	GD	Pts
1	Celtic	38	27	10	1	79	17	+62	64
2	Morton	38	24	6	8	72	39	+33	54
3	Rangers	38	24	5	9	68	32	+36	53
4	Airdrieonians	38	21	8	9	71	38	+33	50
5	Third Lanark	38	19	11	8	53	37	+16	49

Source: "1916-1917 SFL - SPFL Archive". SPFL.

==== Matches ====
19 August 1916 First Division	St Mirren	1–5	Celtic	Paisley
				Stadium: St Mirren Park, Love Street; Attendance: 13,000

26 August 1916 First Division	Celtic	3–1	Hibernian	Glasgow
				Stadium: Celtic Park; Attendance: 8,000

2 September 1916 First Division	Ayr United	0–1	Celtic	Glasgow
				Stadium: Celtic Park; Attendance: 6,000

9 September 1916 First Division	Celtic	3–1	Airdrieonaians	Glasgow
				Stadium: Celtic Park; Attendance: 12,000

16 September 1916 First Division	Motherwell	0–4	Celtic	Motherwell
				Stadium: Fir Park; Attendance: 14,000

30 September 1916 First Division	Celtic	1–0	Hearts	Glasgow
				Stadium: Celtic Park; Attendance: 12,000

14 October 1916 First Division	Falkirk	1–1	Celtic	Falkirk
				Stadium: Brockville Park; Attendance: 4,000

21 October 1916 First Division	Celtic	0–0	Morton	Glasgow
				Stadium: Celtic Park; Attendance: 25,000

28 October 1916 First Division	Celtic	0–0	Rangers	Glasgow
				Stadium: Celtic Park; Attendance: 40,000

4 November 1916 First Division	Dundee	1–2	Celtic	Dundee
				Stadium: Dens Park; Attendance: 14,000

11 November 1916 First Division	Queen's Park	1–3	Celtic	Glasgow
				Stadium: Hampden Park; Attendance: 18,000

18 November 1916 First Division	Celtic	0–0	Partick Thistle	Glasgow
				Stadium: Celtic Park; Attendance: 6,000

25 November 1916 First Division	Celtic	1–0	Aberdeen	Glasgow
				Stadium: Celtic Park; Attendance: 8,000

2 December 1916 First Division	Raith Rovers	1–4	Celtic	Kirkcaldy
				Stadium: Stark's Park; Attendance: 3,000

9 December 1916 First Division	Celtic	5–0	Ayr United	Glasgow
				Stadium: Celtic Park; Attendance: 4,000

16 December 1916 First Division	Hamilton Academical	0–4	Celtic	Hamilton
				Stadium: Douglas Park; Attendance: 6,000

23 December 1916 First Division	Partick Thistle	0–2	Celtic	Glasgow
				Stadium: Firhill Park; Attendance: 16,000

30 December 1916 First Division	Celtic	2–0	Falkirk	Glasgow
				Stadium: Celtic Park; Attendance: 8,000

1 January 1917 First Division	Rangers	0–0	Celtic	Glasgow
				Stadium: Ibrox Park; Attendance: 50,000

2 January 1917 First Division	Celtic	0–0	Clyde	Glasgow
				Stadium: Celtic Park; Attendance: 7,000

6 January 1917 First Division	Celtic	1–0	Motherwell	Glasgow
				Stadium: Celtic Park; Attendance: 9,000

13 January 1917 First Division	Hearts	0–1	Celtic	Edinburgh
				Stadium: Tynecastle Park; Attendance: 12,000

20 January 1917 First Division	Celtic	1–1	Dumbarton	Glasgow
				Stadium: Celtic Park; Attendance: 5,000

27 January 1917 First Division	Third Lanark	0–0	Celtic	Glasgow
				Stadium: Cathkin Park; Attendance: 16,000

3 February 1917 First Division	Celtic	5–0	Raith Rovers	Glasgow
				Stadium: Celtic Park; Attendance: 16,000

10 February 1917 First Division	Morton	0–1	Celtic	Greenock
				Stadium: Cappielow Park; Attendance: 16,000

17 February 1917 First Division	Celtic	2–0	Dundee	Glasgow
				Stadium: Celtic Park; Attendance: 10,000

24 February 1917 First Division	Kilmarnock	2–2	Celtic	Kilmarnock
				Stadium: Rugby Park; Attendance: 6,000

3 March 1917 First Division	Celtic	3–2	Queen's Park	Glasgow
				Stadium: Celtic Park; Attendance: 16,000

10 March 1917 First Division	Celtic	6–1	Hamilton Academical	Glasgow
				Stadium: Celtic Park; Attendance: 10,000

17 March 1917 First Division	Airdrieonians	1–2	Celtic	Airdrie
				Stadium: Broomfield Park; Attendance: 8,000

24 March 1917 First Division	Aberdeen	0–0	Celtic	Aberdeen
				Stadium: Pittodrie Park; Attendance: 7,000

31 March 1917 First Division	Celtic	3–0	St Mirren	Glasgow
				Stadium: Celtic Park; Attendance: 8,000

7 April 1917 First Division	Dumbarton	1–3	Celtic	Dumbarton
				Stadium: Boghead Park; Attendance: 8,000

9 April 1917 First Division	Celtic	2–0	Third Lanark	Glasgow
				Stadium: Celtic Park; Attendance: 12,000

14 April 1917 First Division	Hibernian	0–1	Celtic	Edinburgh
				Stadium: Easter Road; Attendance: 8,000

21 April 1917 First Division	Celtic	0–2	Kilmarnock	Glasgow
				Stadium: Celtic Park; Attendance: 18,000

28 April 1917 First Division	Clyde	0–5	Celtic	Glasgow
				Stadium: Shawfield Stadium; Attendance: 16,000

=== Friendly ===
26 May 1917	Scottish League XI	2–1	Celtic	Glasgow
	James Bowie (2)		Jimmy McColl	Stadium: Hampden Park; Attendance: 30,000; Referee: G. H. McKenzie

- Charity fundraising match between the Scottish League winners and the 'Rest of the League'.
