= 1924–25 Celtic F.C. season =

Celtic
1924–25 season
- Manager: Willie Maley
- Stadium: Celtic Park
- Scottish First Division: 4th
- Scottish Cup: Winners

The 1924–25 Scottish football season was Celtic's 37th season of competitive football, in which they competed in the Scottish First Division and the Scottish Cup.

In the league, they dropped to 4th place from 3rd the previous season, below Hibernian, Airdrieonians and three-in-a-row champions Rangers.

However, their Scottish Cup campaign was way more fruitful as they successfully reclaimed the trophy. They were crowned cup champions for the 11th time in the club's history, their 27th major domestic honour.

Celtic won the final 2-1 against Dundee, with goals by Patrick Gallacher and Jimmy McGrory. Previously, they had defeated Rangers 5-0 in the semi-final, St. Mirren in a 4th round second replay, and Solway Star, Alloa Athletic and Third Lanark in the early rounds.

== Competitions ==
=== Scottish First Division ===
==== League table ====
Pos	Team	Pld	W	D	L	GF	GA	GD	Pts
2	Airdrieonians	38	25	7	6	85	31	+54	57
3	Hibernian	38	22	8	8	78	43	+35	52
4	Celtic	38	18	8	12	77	44	+33	44
5	Cowdenbeath	38	16	10	12	76	65	+11	42
6	St Mirren	38	18	5	15	66	63	+3	41

==== Matches ====
16 August 1924 First Division	Dundee	0–0	Celtic	Dundee
				Stadium: Dens Park; Attendance: 22,000

19 August 1924 First Division	Partick Thistle	2–2	Celtic	Glasgow
				Stadium: Firhill Park; Attendance: 15,000

23 August 1924 First Division	Celtic	1–1	Airdrieonians	Glasgow
				Stadium: Celtic Park; Attendance: 12,000

30 August 1924 First Division	Falkirk	1–2	Celtic	Falkirk
				Stadium: Brockville Park; Attendance: 16,000

6 September 1924 First Division	Aberdeen	0–4	Celtic	Aberdeen
				Stadium: Pittodrie Park; Attendance: 24,000

13 September 1924 First Division	Celtic	5–0	St Mirren	Glasgow
				Stadium: Celtic Park; Attendance: 15,000

15 September 1924 First Division	Hibernian	2–3	Celtic	Edinburgh
				Stadium: Easter Road; Attendance: 20,000

27 September 1924 First Division	Celtic	4–0	Motherwell	Glasgow
				Stadium: Celtic Park; Attendance: 18,000

29 September 1924 First Division	Celtic	3–1	Cowdenbeath	Glasgow
				Stadium: Celtic Park; Attendance: 15,000

11 October 1924 First Division	Celtic	1–0	Hearts	Glasgow
				Stadium: Celtic Park; Attendance: 10,000

18 October 1924 First Division	St Johnstone	0–0	Celtic	Perth
				Stadium: Recreation Grounds; Attendance: 12,000

25 October 1924 First Division	Celtic	0–1	Rangers	Glasgow
				Stadium: Celtic Park; Attendance: 38,000

1 November 1924 First Division	Morton	1–0	Celtic	Greenock
				Stadium: Cappielow; Attendance: 8,000

8 November 1924 First Division	Celtic	6–0	Kilmarnock	Glasgow
				Stadium: Celtic Park; Attendance: 8,000

15 November 1924 First Division	Queen's Park	3–1	Celtic	Glasgow
				Stadium: Hampden Park; Attendance: 15,000

22 November 1924 First Division	Third Lanark	1–1	Celtic	Glasgow
				Stadium: Cathkin Park; Attendance: 15,000

29 November 1924 First Division	Celtic	1–2	Partick Thistle	Glasgow
				Stadium: Celtic Park; Attendance: 12,000

6 December 1924 First Division	Celtic	2–0	Ayr United	Glasgow
				Stadium: Celtic Park; Attendance: 6,000

13 December 1924 First Division	Hearts	3–1	Celtic	Edinburgh
				Stadium: Tynecastle Park; Attendance: 18,000

20 December 1924 First Division	Celtic	0–2	Hamilton Academical	Glasgow
				Stadium: Celtic Park; Attendance: 6,000

27 December 1924 First Division	Raith Rovers	2–2	Celtic	Kirkcaldy
				Stadium: Stark's Park; Attendance: 6,000

1 January 1925 First Division	Rangers	4–1	Celtic	Glasgow
				Stadium: Ibrox Park; Attendance: 34,000

3 January 1925 First Division	Airdrieonians	3–1	Celtic	Airdrie
				Stadium: Broomfield Park; Attendance: 20,000

5 January 1925 First Division	Celtic	7–0	Third Lanark	Glasgow
				Stadium: Celtic Park; Attendance: 15,000

10 January 1925 First Division	Celtic	3–1	Aberdeen	Glasgow
				Stadium: Celtic Park; Attendance: 6,000

17 January 1925 First Division	Motherwell	1–0	Celtic	Motherwell
				Stadium: Fir Park; Attendance: 8,000

31 January 1925 First Division	Celtic	1–1	Hibernian	Glasgow
				Stadium: Celtic Park; Attendance: 6,000

11 February 1925 First Division	Ayr United	1–2	Celtic	Ayr
				Stadium: Somerset Park; Attendance: 6,000

14 February 1925 First Division	Celtic	2–1	St Johnstone	Glasgow
				Stadium: Celtic Park; Attendance: 8,000

24 February 1925 First Division	Hamilton Academical	0–4	Celtic	Hamilton
				Stadium: Douglas Park; Attendance: 6,000

28 February 1925 First Division	Celtic	4–0	Dundee	Glasgow
				Stadium: Celtic Park; Attendance: 8,000

14 March 1925 First Division	Cowdenbeath	3–0	Celtic	Cowdenbeath
				Stadium: Central Park; Attendance: 13,000

24 March 1925 First Division	Celtic	2–1	Morton	Glasgow
				Stadium: Celtic Park; Attendance: 5,000

28 March 1925 First Division	Celtic	2–0	Raith Rovers	Glasgow
				Stadium: Celtic Park; Attendance: 6,000

1 April 1925 First Division	Celtic	6–1	Falkirk	Glasgow
				Stadium: Celtic Park; Attendance: 5,000

15 April 1925 First Division	Kilmarnock	2–1	Celtic	Kilmarnock
				Stadium: Rugby Park; Attendance: 4,000

18 April 1925 First Division	Celtic	1–1	Queen's Park	Glasgow
				Stadium: Celtic Park; Attendance: 10,000

25 April 1925 First Division	St Mirren	2–1	Celtic	Paisley
				Stadium: St Mirren Park, Love Street; Attendance: 8,000

=== Scottish Cup ===
24 January 1925 First round	Third Lanark	1–5	Celtic	Glasgow
				Stadium: Cathkin Park; Attendance: 42,000

7 February 1925 Second round	Celtic	2–1	Alloa Athletic	Glasgow
				Stadium: Celtic Park; Attendance: 12,000

21 February 1925 Third round	Celtic	2–0	Solway Star	Glasgow
				Stadium: Celtic Park; Attendance: 7,000

7 March 1925 Fourth round	St Mirren	0–0	Celtic	Paisley
				Stadium: St Mirren Park, Love Street; Attendance: 47,428

10 March 1925 Fourth round replay	Celtic	1–1	St Mirren	Glasgow
				Stadium: Celtic Park; Attendance: 36,000

16 March 1925 Fourth round Second Replay	Celtic	1–0	St Mirren	Glasgow
				Stadium: Celtic Park; Attendance: 47,492

21 March 1925 Semi-final	Rangers	0–5	Celtic	Glasgow
				Stadium: Hampden Park; Attendance: 101,714

11 April 1926 Final	Celtic	2–1	Dundee	Glasgow
				Stadium: Hampden Park; Attendance: 75,137
