= 1919–20 Scottish Football League =

Scottish Football League
- Season: 1919–20
- Champions: Rangers
- Relegated: N/A

Statistics of the Scottish Football League in season 1919–20. The competition was won by Rangers by three points over nearest rival Celtic.

== League table ==
Pos	Team	Pld	W	D	L	GF	GA	GD	Pts
1	Rangers (C)	42	31	9	2	106	25	+81	71
2	Celtic	42	29	10	3	89	31	+58	68
3	Motherwell	42	23	11	8	74	53	+21	57
4	Dundee	42	22	6	14	79	65	+14	50
5	Clydebank	42	20	8	14	79	65	+14	48
6	Morton	42	16	13	13	71	48	+23	45
7	Airdrieonians	42	17	10	15	57	43	+14	44
8	Third Lanark	42	16	11	15	56	62	−6	43
9	Kilmarnock	42	20	3	19	59	73	−14	43
10	Ayr United	42	15	10	17	72	69	+3	40
11	Dumbarton	42	13	13	16	57	65	−8	39
12	St Mirren	42	15	8	19	63	81	−18	38
13	Partick Thistle	42	13	12	17	51	62	−11	38
14	Queen's Park	42	14	10	18	67	73	−6	38
15	Heart of Midlothian	42	14	9	19	57	72	−15	37
16	Clyde	42	14	9	19	64	71	−7	37
17	Aberdeen	42	11	13	18	46	64	−18	35
18	Hibernian	42	13	7	22	60	79	−19	33
19	Raith Rovers	42	11	10	21	61	83	−22	32
20	Falkirk	42	10	11	21	45	74	−29	31
21	Hamilton Academical	42	11	7	24	56	86	−30	29
22	Albion Rovers	42	10	8	24	43	77	−34	28

Source: "1919-1920 SFL - SPFL Archive". SPFL.
(C) Champions

== Results ==
Home \ Away	ABE	AIR	ALB	AYR	CEL	CLY	CLB	DUM	DND	FAL	HAM	HOM	HIB	KIL	MOR	MOT	PAR	QPA	RAI	RAN	STM	THI
Aberdeen		2–1	2–0	2–1	0–1	1–0	0–2	3–4	2–0	1–1	2–0	1–1	1–1	1–0	0–0	1–1	0–0	1–1	3–1	0–2	0–1	0–1
Airdrieonians	2–0		2–1	1–0	0–0	0–0	1–0	1–1	1–2	1–0	2–0	4–1	2–0	0–0	0–0	0–1	2–0	3–0	3–1	0–1	1–1	1–2
Albion Rovers	1–1	0–2		2–1	0–5	0–2	2–1	1–2	1–2	2–1	1–1	6–2	1–2	0–2	2–4	1–1	2–0	2–0	0–0	0–4	0–2	3–2
Ayr United	0–0	1–1	4–0		1–1	3–1	1–1	2–1	5–3	5–1	4–0	1–2	1–0	5–0	2–0	0–0	3–0	2–2	1–1	0–3	1–2	2–0
Celtic	5–0	1–0	3–0	4–0		3–1	3–1	3–1	1–1	1–1	2–0	3–0	7–3	1–0	1–1	5–0	0–0	3–1	3–0	1–1	2–2	2–1
Clyde	2–0	0–2	2–2	4–0	0–2		0–3	1–2	3–2	4–0	2–2	0–1	2–0	2–1	4–2	4–1	3–2	4–2	4–3	0–0	3–3	0–1
Clydebank	3–0	1–2	5–2	4–3	2–0	2–3		1–1	3–3	3–1	3–0	0–1	3–3	1–0	1–0	5–1	2–1	1–1	4–1	0–0	3–1	0–0
Dumbarton	4–0	1–1	2–1	1–1	0–0	1–0	1–0		0–3	0–0	4–1	2–0	2–0	2–2	0–1	2–3	1–1	1–5	1–1	0–0	1–3	0–0
Dundee	1–3	1–1	3–2	7–1	2–1	3–0	1–0	3–1		1–0	2–1	1–0	3–1	3–2	2–0	3–0	2–1	1–1	5–4	0–2	1–2	3–1
Falkirk	3–1	0–2	1–1	1–2	1–2	1–1	1–0	3–2	2–1		3–2	3–3	3–0	1–0	1–1	1–2	2–2	2–0	4–1	0–3	3–1	0–0
Hamilton Academical	2–1	1–0	0–2	2–1	1–2	2–2	2–0	1–3	0–1	3–1		2–2	3–2	5–2	2–2	0–3	3–2	3–0	5–5	1–2	2–1	0–0
Heart of Midlothian	1–1	3–1	0–0	0–1	0–1	0–3	4–2	1–2	2–1	3–0	2–0		1–3	0–1	3–6	2–0	3–1	3–1	1–1	0–0	1–2	1–1
Hibernian	2–1	1–4	0–1	1–2	1–2	1–0	2–0	3–3	0–0	2–0	3–0	2–4		4–1	1–0	0–1	6–2	3–2	2–0	1–1	2–1	1–2
Kilmarnock	0–3	3–2	1–0	2–1	2–3	2–1	2–4	3–1	4–2	3–0	2–1	2–1	4–1		0–1	0–1	2–0	1–0	2–0	1–7	3–2	1–0
Morton	3–1	0–2	1–1	3–1	1–2	2–0	1–1	4–0	0–0	3–0	4–0	2–0	1–1	4–0		0–1	0–0	0–1	0–0	0–2	3–1	5–1
Motherwell	3–3	2–1	2–0	1–1	0–0	5–1	3–2	1–1	3–1	4–0	1–0	4–1	3–2	1–1	4–3		1–0	4–1	4–1	1–0	3–0	3–3
Partick Thistle	0–1	3–1	2–0	2–2	1–2	2–2	3–2	1–0	1–0	1–1	4–3	0–2	1–0	1–0	1–1	2–1		2–0	3–0	1–2	3–3	2–1
Queen's Park	3–0	1–0	2–1	6–3	1–2	4–1	0–2	2–1	3–2	2–0	3–1	2–2	2–2	1–3	4–3	1–1	0–1		1–2	0–0	1–1	2–0
Raith Rovers	2–2	3–2	3–0	2–1	0–3	3–1	1–3	2–0	1–3	0–0	1–0	0–1	1–0	5–1	1–1	0–2	2–0	2–5		1–2	3–0	0–2
Rangers	3–2	3–2	3–0	2–1	3–0	1–0	1–2	4–0	6–1	3–1	4–1	3–0	7–0	5–0	3–1	0–0	2–2	3–1	3–2		3–1	6–1
St Mirren	3–1	4–2	1–2	1–4	0–2	0–0	0–3	1–5	1–3	1–0	2–0	4–1	2–1	1–2	1–3	2–1	2–0	3–1	1–1	0–4		2–2
Third Lanark	2–2	1–1	1–0	2–1	1–4	4–1	1–2	1–0	2–0	4–1	1–3	2–1	2–0	0–1	0–4	2–0	0–0	1–1	4–3	0–2	4–1	

Legend: Blue = home team win; Yellow = draw; Red = away team win.

== See also ==
- 1919–20 in Scottish football
