= 1921–22 Scottish Division One =

23rd season of top-tier football league in Scotland

Scottish Division One
- Season: 1921–22
- Champions: Celtic
- Relegated: Dumbarton; Queen's Park; Clydebank

The 1921–22 Scottish Division One season was won by Celtic by one point over nearest rival Rangers. Dumbarton, Queen's Park and Clydebank finished 20th and 21st and 22nd respectively and were relegated to the 1922–23 Scottish Division Two.

== League table ==
Pos	Team	Pld	W	D	L	GF	GA	GD	Pts	Qualification or relegation
1	Celtic (C)	42	27	13	2	83	20	+63	67	
2	Rangers	42	28	10	4	83	26	+57	66	
3	Raith Rovers	42	19	13	10	66	43	+23	51	
4	Dundee	42	19	11	12	57	40	+17	49	
5	Falkirk	42	16	17	9	48	38	+10	49	
6	Partick Thistle	42	20	8	14	57	53	+4	48	
7	Hibernian	42	16	14	12	55	44	+11	46	
8	St Mirren	42	17	12	13	71	61	+10	46	
9	Third Lanark	42	17	12	13	58	52	+6	46	
10	Clyde	42	16	12	14	60	51	+9	44	
11	Albion Rovers	42	17	10	15	55	51	+4	44	
12	Morton	42	16	10	16	58	57	+1	42	
13	Motherwell	42	16	7	19	63	58	+5	39	
14	Ayr United	42	13	12	17	55	63	−8	38	
15	Aberdeen	42	13	9	20	48	54	−6	35	
16	Airdrieonians	42	12	11	19	46	56	−10	35	
17	Kilmarnock	42	13	9	20	56	83	−27	35	
18	Hamilton Academical	42	9	16	17	51	62	−11	34	
19	Hearts	42	11	10	21	50	60	−10	32	
20	Dumbarton (R)	42	10	10	22	46	81	−35	30	Relegation to the 1922–23 Second Division
21	Queen's Park (R)	42	9	10	23	38	82	−44	28	Relegation to the 1922–23 Second Division
22	Clydebank (R)	42	6	8	28	34	103	−69	20	Relegation to the 1922–23 Second Division

Source: "1921-1922 Division 1 - SPFL Archive". SPFL.
(C) Champions; (R) Relegated

== Results ==
Home \ Away	ABE	AIR	ALB	AYR	CEL	CLY	CLB	DUM	DND	FAL	HAM	HOM	HIB	KIL	MOR	MOT	PAR	QPA	RAI	RAN	STM	THI
Aberdeen		3–0	2–0	1–0	1–1	4–2	2–0	3–0	1–2	1–1	0–0	0–1	1–2	0–1	2–2	2–0	2–1	2–1	1–2	0–0	0–1	3–0
Airdrieonians	4–0		1–1	2–1	0–2	1–1	2–3	3–1	0–2	3–0	1–1	3–0	2–1	2–0	3–2	2–0	0–1	1–1	0–2	1–2	4–1	0–1
Albion Rovers	0–2	2–0		2–3	0–2	1–1	2–0	1–0	1–0	4–0	1–0	2–0	2–1	4–0	1–2	0–0	0–1	1–1	2–0	0–5	0–0	1–0
Ayr United	1–1	1–2	2–1		0–0	3–2	1–0	2–0	0–2	1–1	2–0	2–1	2–2	4–2	0–0	2–1	2–1	1–0	0–0	0–1	2–3	2–0
Celtic	2–0	1–0	3–1	2–1		1–0	6–0	4–0	4–0	0–0	4–0	3–0	3–1	1–0	1–0	2–0	3–0	3–1	4–0	0–0	2–0	2–0
Clyde	2–0	1–1	1–1	2–1	1–1		2–1	5–0	3–1	1–2	1–1	3–2	2–0	3–0	1–0	1–0	4–0	0–2	1–1	0–0	1–1	1–0
Clydebank	1–1	2–0	0–3	2–0	0–2	1–2		0–1	0–3	0–0	1–1	1–1	0–2	1–1	2–1	2–0	1–3	0–0	0–3	1–7	3–2	0–4
Dumbarton	1–1	1–0	1–2	3–1	0–5	4–1	2–0		2–0	0–0	1–2	3–2	1–1	5–3	2–1	3–2	1–4	2–3	1–2	0–4	0–2	3–3
Dundee	1–0	1–1	2–0	1–0	0–0	2–1	1–1	2–0		3–0	2–0	2–0	0–0	5–0	2–1	1–1	0–0	3–1	1–0	0–0	2–2	2–0
Falkirk	2–1	2–0	0–1	1–1	1–1	0–0	3–1	0–0	1–0		0–0	1–0	3–1	2–1	7–0	1–0	3–0	2–0	1–1	1–0	3–1	1–2
Hamilton Academical	2–2	0–0	5–3	2–2	1–3	1–0	3–1	1–1	1–2	1–1		1–0	1–2	7–1	1–1	3–1	3–2	1–1	1–2	0–0	2–3	0–1
Heart of Midlothian	2–1	4–0	2–2	6–2	1–2	0–1	3–0	2–0	0–0	4–1	0–0		0–2	1–0	0–0	0–0	1–3	0–1	1–1	1–2	3–2	3–1
Hibernian	0–1	0–0	0–1	1–1	2–1	2–1	6–0	0–0	1–1	1–1	1–0	2–1		3–0	2–1	2–0	2–0	3–0	2–1	0–0	1–1	0–1
Kilmarnock	2–3	2–1	1–1	2–2	4–3	1–0	3–2	1–0	5–3	1–2	1–1	3–0	1–1		2–1	4–0	2–1	2–0	2–2	1–2	1–1	3–0
Morton	2–1	3–0	2–1	2–1	1–1	0–3	3–0	1–0	2–1	2–0	1–0	1–1	2–2	5–1		0–0	4–0	1–0	3–1	1–2	2–1	1–1
Motherwell	3–0	1–2	1–1	2–1	1–1	2–0	5–2	5–0	2–1	0–1	2–1	3–1	4–1	3–0	2–0		2–1	5–1	2–1	2–0	1–1	1–3
Partick Thistle	2–0	1–1	0–1	1–1	0–0	2–1	1–0	4–2	4–1	0–0	1–0	1–1	2–0	2–0	3–2	0–2		1–0	2–1	0–1	3–1	2–2
Queen's Park	3–1	1–1	0–4	1–6	1–3	0–3	2–2	1–0	0–3	2–1	1–5	1–1	1–3	1–1	1–3	2–1	0–1		1–3	2–4	1–0	0–0
Raith Rovers	2–1	1–0	3–0	5–0	1–1	1–1	5–0	1–1	0–0	2–1	1–0	3–1	0–0	4–0	1–0	4–1	2–0	1–1		0–3	2–3	2–2
Rangers	1–0	3–0	3–1	2–0	1–1	3–0	6–1	1–1	2–1	0–0	5–0	0–2	2–0	1–0	3–0	2–1	2–2	2–1	0–1		4–1	2–1
St Mirren	2–1	1–0	2–1	1–1	0–2	6–3	4–1	4–2	2–1	0–0	5–0	2–1	1–1	1–1	1–1	2–1	1–2	5–0	1–2	1–2		1–2
Third Lanark	2–0	2–2	2–2	2–0	0–0	1–1	4–1	1–1	1–0	1–1	2–2	2–0	2–1	2–0	3–1	4–3	1–2	0–1	1–0	1–3	0–1	

Legend: Blue = home team win; Yellow = draw; Red = away team win.
