= 1923–24 Scottish Division One =

25th season of top-tier football league in Scotland

Scottish Division One
- Season: 1923–24
- Champions: Rangers
- Relegated: Clyde; Clydebank

The 1923–24 Scottish Division One season was won by Rangers by nine points over nearest rival Airdrieonians. Clyde and Clydebank finished 19th and 20th respectively and were relegated to the 1924–25 Scottish Division Two.

== League table ==
Pos	Team	Pld	W	D	L	GF	GA	GD	Pts
1	Rangers	38	25	9	4	72	22	+50	59
2	Airdrieonians	38	20	10	8	72	46	+26	50
3	Celtic	38	17	12	9	56	33	+23	46
4	Raith Rovers	38	18	7	13	56	38	+18	43
5	Dundee	38	15	13	10	70	57	+13	43
6	St Mirren	38	15	12	11	53	45	+8	42
7	Hibernian	38	15	11	12	66	52	+14	41
8	Partick Thistle	38	15	9	14	58	55	+3	39
9	Heart of Midlothian	38	14	10	14	61	50	+11	38
10	Motherwell	38	15	7	16	58	63	−5	37
11	Morton	38	16	5	17	48	54	−6	37
12	Hamilton Academical	38	15	6	17	52	57	−5	36
13	Aberdeen	38	13	10	15	37	41	−4	36
14	Ayr United	38	12	10	16	38	60	−22	34
15	Falkirk	38	13	6	19	46	53	−7	32
16	Kilmarnock	38	12	8	18	48	65	−17	32
17	Queen's Park	38	11	9	18	43	60	−17	31
18	Third Lanark	38	11	8	19	54	78	−24	30
19	Clyde	38	10	9	19	40	70	−30	29
20	Clydebank	38	10	5	23	42	71	−29	25

Source: "1923-1924 Division 1 - SPFL Archive". SPFL (in Malay).

== Results ==
Home \ Away	ABE	AIR	AYR	CEL	CLY	CLB	DND	FAL	HAM	HOM	HIB	KIL	MOR	MOT	PAR	QPA	RAI	RAN	STM	THI
Aberdeen		1–2	1–0	0–2	3–0	3–1	0–0	0–0	2–0	2–1	1–1	2–0	0–2	3–1	2–1	1–1	1–0	1–0	2–0	2–2
Airdrieonians	2–1		4–0	2–0	6–1	3–2	4–2	4–1	3–2	3–0	1–1	2–2	1–1	2–0	1–1	2–2	1–0	0–0	4–0	3–1
Ayr United	1–1	2–3		4–2	2–1	3–1	2–0	2–0	0–0	2–1	2–2	0–0	1–0	0–0	1–1	2–1	1–0	2–1	2–2	3–0
Celtic	4–0	2–2	3–0		4–0	1–2	0–0	2–1	1–0	4–1	1–1	2–1	3–0	2–1	1–2	1–0	0–0	2–2	0–1	3–1
Clyde	1–0	1–1	1–0	0–0		2–0	0–2	2–1	0–0	2–2	2–0	1–1	3–0	2–3	4–4	0–1	2–1	3–1	0–3	0–1
Clydebank	2–1	0–1	1–0	0–0	2–1		0–0	0–1	1–0	2–1	2–4	1–2	0–1	0–2	2–0	2–1	2–1	1–2	2–2	1–5
Dundee	1–1	3–1	2–1	2–1	3–1	4–1		4–2	1–1	5–1	7–2	4–2	1–1	4–1	0–0	3–0	1–1	1–4	1–1	1–0
Falkirk	0–0	0–3	2–0	3–1	1–0	2–0	4–1		1–2	0–0	1–1	2–1	2–0	2–0	0–1	1–3	3–0	0–1	0–0	4–1
Hamilton Academical	3–0	5–1	0–0	2–5	1–2	3–2	0–0	1–2		1–3	2–1	2–1	4–1	2–1	3–1	2–1	0–2	2–3	2–0	2–0
Heart of Midlothian	0–1	4–2	2–3	0–0	6–0	2–0	1–0	3–1	4–0		1–1	4–1	3–1	2–1	2–1	5–2	1–2	0–0	0–0	3–1
Hibernian	0–1	2–0	3–0	0–0	3–1	3–2	2–0	1–0	1–3	1–1		3–1	2–1	2–4	3–1	4–0	4–0	1–3	1–1	5–2
Kilmarnock	2–1	1–2	1–1	1–1	3–0	2–3	1–3	2–1	1–0	2–1	2–1		1–3	1–0	3–1	1–4	1–2	1–1	2–0	0–0
Morton	1–1	2–1	4–0	1–0	1–2	1–0	2–1	2–1	0–0	1–0	1–0	0–2		3–2	1–2	3–1	2–0	0–1	4–0	2–2
Motherwell	1–1	2–1	1–0	0–1	1–1	3–2	4–2	3–1	3–1	3–2	2–1	4–0	3–1		1–1	2–1	1–3	0–3	0–2	2–2
Partick Thistle	1–0	2–1	3–0	1–1	6–1	1–1	5–2	0–1	0–1	0–1	1–0	2–2	2–0	0–2		3–0	2–0	0–6	1–2	2–2
Queen's Park	1–0	0–2	0–0	0–2	0–0	1–1	1–1	4–2	2–1	1–1	1–1	3–1	3–1	2–2	0–2		2–1	0–2	0–1	1–0
Raith Rovers	1–0	2–0	4–1	1–0	2–1	1–0	3–0	3–0	0–1	1–1	0–2	4–1	4–0	1–1	4–1	2–0		0–1	1–1	6–1
Rangers	2–0	0–0	5–0	0–0	2–1	3–0	1–1	2–2	4–0	1–0	2–1	2–0	2–1	3–0	1–0	1–0	0–1		5–0	2–0
St Mirren	2–0	0–1	4–0	0–1	3–1	6–2	2–2	1–0	4–1	0–0	1–1	0–1	3–1	4–0	1–2	2–0	1–1	0–0		3–1
Third Lanark	2–1	0–0	3–0	1–3	0–0	2–1	3–5	2–1	3–2	2–1	1–4	2–1	0–2	2–1	2–4	2–3	1–1	1–3	3–0	

Legend: Blue = home team win; Yellow = draw; Red = away team win.
