= 1918–19 Scottish Football League =

Scottish Football League
- Season: 1918–19
- Champions: Celtic
- Relegated: N/A

Statistics of the Scottish Football League in season 1918–19. The competition won by Celtic by one point over nearest rival Rangers.

== League table ==
| Pos | Team | Pld | W | D | L | GF | GA | GD | Pts |
|---|---|---|---|---|---|---|---|---|---|
| 1 | Celtic (C) | 34 | 26 | 6 | 2 | 71 | 22 | +49 | 58 |
| 2 | Rangers | 34 | 26 | 5 | 3 | 86 | 16 | +70 | 57 |
| 3 | Morton | 34 | 18 | 11 | 5 | 76 | 40 | +36 | 47 |
| 4 | Partick Thistle | 34 | 17 | 7 | 10 | 62 | 43 | +19 | 41 |
| 5 | Motherwell | 34 | 14 | 10 | 10 | 51 | 40 | +11 | 38 |
| 5 | Ayr United | 34 | 15 | 8 | 11 | 62 | 53 | +9 | 38 |
| 7 | Heart of Midlothian | 34 | 14 | 9 | 11 | 59 | 52 | +7 | 37 |
| 8 | Kilmarnock | 34 | 14 | 7 | 13 | 61 | 59 | +2 | 35 |
| 9 | Queen's Park | 34 | 15 | 5 | 14 | 59 | 57 | +2 | 35 |
| 10 | St Mirren | 34 | 10 | 12 | 12 | 43 | 55 | −12 | 32 |
| 10 | Clydebank | 34 | 12 | 8 | 14 | 54 | 65 | −11 | 32 |
| 12 | Third Lanark | 34 | 11 | 9 | 14 | 60 | 62 | −2 | 31 |
| 13 | Airdrieonians | 34 | 9 | 11 | 14 | 45 | 54 | −9 | 29 |
| 14 | Hamilton Academical | 34 | 11 | 5 | 18 | 49 | 75 | −26 | 27 |
| 15 | Dumbarton | 34 | 7 | 8 | 19 | 31 | 58 | −27 | 22 |
| 16 | Clyde | 34 | 7 | 6 | 21 | 45 | 75 | −30 | 20 |
| 16 | Falkirk | 34 | 6 | 8 | 20 | 46 | 73 | −27 | 20 |
| 18 | Hibernian | 34 | 5 | 3 | 26 | 30 | 91 | −61 | 13 |

Source: "1918-1919 SFL - SPFL Archive". SPFL.
(C) Champions

== Results ==
| Home \ Away | AIR | AYR | CEL | CLY | CLB | DUM | FAL | HAM | HOM | HIB | KIL | MOR | MOT | PAR | QPA | RAN | STM | THI |
|---|---|---|---|---|---|---|---|---|---|---|---|---|---|---|---|---|---|---|
| Airdrieonians | | 0–1 | 1–2 | 1–2 | 2–1 | 1–1 | 1–1 | 0–2 | 1–0 | 3–3 | 2–2 | 2–1 | 1–1 | 1–1 | 1–2 | 0–0 | 3–1 | 1–6 |
| Ayr United | 1–4 | | 0–2 | 4–1 | 2–0 | 5–0 | 2–0 | 4–1 | 1–2 | 5–0 | 3–1 | 1–5 | 1–2 | 0–1 | 2–0 | 1–1 | 2–0 | 0–2 |
| Celtic | 3–0 | 1–0 | | 2–0 | 3–1 | 2–0 | 4–0 | 4–1 | 1–1 | 2–0 | 2–1 | 1–1 | 0–0 | 2–1 | 2–0 | 0–3 | 1–0 | 3–1 |
| Clyde | 3–5 | 3–1 | 0–3 | | 0–2 | 4–1 | 2–4 | 0–1 | 4–2 | 2–1 | 1–1 | 0–2 | 1–2 | 1–1 | 0–1 | 0–4 | 1–1 | 1–1 |
| Clydebank | 2–2 | 1–3 | 0–2 | 3–1 | | 3–1 | 3–2 | 3–3 | 1–3 | 2–1 | 3–1 | 2–3 | 2–1 | 1–3 | 3–2 | 0–5 | 1–1 | 1–1 |
| Dumbarton | 0–0 | 0–0 | 0–5 | 1–0 | 1–1 | | 1–2 | 1–2 | 1–2 | 4–0 | 0–1 | 0–1 | 2–0 | 1–1 | 0–0 | 0–2 | 0–0 | 4–3 |
| Falkirk | 1–0 | 4–4 | 1–2 | 1–3 | 0–0 | 5–1 | | 3–1 | 0–0 | 1–1 | 0–1 | 1–2 | 2–3 | 2–2 | 2–3 | 0–4 | 1–2 | 4–5 |
| Hamilton Academical | 3–1 | 2–2 | 1–2 | 4–2 | 1–3 | 0–3 | 1–2 | | 1–4 | 1–0 | 2–0 | 1–1 | 1–3 | 1–2 | 0–1 | 0–3 | 3–2 | 1–0 |
| Heart of Midlothian | 0–0 | 2–3 | 2–3 | 3–0 | 2–1 | 2–0 | 5–0 | 4–1 | | 3–1 | 1–4 | 1–1 | 0–0 | 1–0 | 2–2 | 1–4 | 0–0 | 2–0 |
| Hibernian | 2–1 | 0–1 | 0–3 | 3–1 | 1–2 | 1–0 | 2–1 | 1–2 | 1–3 | | 1–4 | 0–3 | 0–3 | 0–2 | 1–0 | 1–2 | 1–2 | 1–5 |
| Kilmarnock | 3–1 | 2–3 | 1–1 | 5–3 | 2–3 | 0–0 | 0–0 | 5–0 | 2–2 | 7–1 | | 0–1 | 0–2 | 0–3 | 1–0 | 1–0 | 1–3 | 0–1 |
| Morton | 3–2 | 1–1 | 0–0 | 3–0 | 2–2 | 3–1 | 4–0 | 3–3 | 2–0 | 9–2 | 2–2 | | 6–2 | 3–0 | 3–3 | 1–0 | 3–1 | 1–1 |
| Motherwell | 1–3 | 4–0 | 3–1 | 3–2 | 1–1 | 3–0 | 2–1 | 1–1 | 1–2 | 0–0 | 1–2 | 2–0 | | 1–1 | 3–1 | 0–1 | 1–2 | 1–1 |
| Partick Thistle | 0–1 | 1–3 | 0–1 | 1–1 | 3–1 | 1–3 | 4–2 | 6–3 | 3–1 | 2–0 | 4–0 | 2–1 | 2–0 | | 2–1 | 1–0 | 5–1 | 1–2 |
| Queen's Park | 1–0 | 2–2 | 0–3 | 3–1 | 3–4 | 1–0 | 2–0 | 3–2 | 4–0 | 3–0 | 1–2 | 4–2 | 1–3 | 4–3 | | 0–2 | 4–1 | 3–4 |
| Rangers | 2–1 | 6–2 | 1–1 | 3–0 | 3–0 | 3–0 | 1–0 | 3–0 | 3–2 | 5–1 | 8–0 | 1–0 | 0–0 | 2–0 | 4–0 | | 2–0 | 4–0 |
| St Mirren | 1–2 | 1–1 | 0–4 | 1–1 | 2–1 | 2–0 | 3–1 | 2–0 | 3–3 | 3–1 | 1–5 | 2–2 | 1–0 | 1–1 | 1–1 | 2–2 | | 0–0 |
| Third Lanark | 1–1 | 1–1 | 2–3 | 1–4 | 2–0 | 2–4 | 2–2 | 1–3 | 3–1 | 4–2 | 3–4 | 0–1 | 1–1 | 1–2 | 1–3 | 1–2 | 1–0 | |

Legend: Blue = home team win; Yellow = draw; Red = away team win.

== See also ==
- 1918–19 in Scottish football
