= 1916–17 Scottish Football League =

Scottish Football League
- Season: 1916–17
- Champions: Celtic
- Relegated: N/A (Note: Aberdeen, Dundee and Raith Rovers were not relegated but withdrew from the league due to travelling difficulties. Clydebank were elected to maintain an even number of teams.)

Statistics of the Scottish Football League in season 1916–17. The competition was won by Celtic by ten points over nearest rival Morton.

== League table ==
Pos	Team	Pld	W	D	L	GF	GA	GD	Pts
1	Celtic (C)	38	27	10	1	79	17	+62	64
2	Morton	38	24	6	8	72	39	+33	54
3	Rangers	38	24	5	9	68	32	+36	53
4	Airdrieonians	38	21	8	9	71	38	+33	50
5	Third Lanark	38	19	11	8	53	37	+16	49
6	Kilmarnock	38	18	7	13	69	46	+23	43
7	St Mirren	38	15	10	13	49	43	+6	40
8	Motherwell	38	16	6	16	57	59	−2	38
9	Dumbarton	38	12	11	15	56	73	−17	35
9	Partick Thistle	38	14	7	17	44	43	+1	35
9	Hamilton Academical	38	13	9	16	54	73	−19	35
12	Clyde	38	10	14	14	41	53	−12	34
12	Falkirk	38	12	10	16	58	57	+1	34
14	Heart of Midlothian	38	14	4	20	44	59	−15	32
15	Ayr United	38	12	7	19	47	59	−12	31
16	Dundee	38	13	4	21	58	71	−13	30
16	Hibernian	38	10	10	18	57	72	−15	30
18	Queen's Park	38	11	7	20	56	81	−25	29
19	Raith Rovers	38	8	7	23	42	91	−49	23
20	Aberdeen	38	7	7	24	36	68	−32	21

Source: "1916-1917 SFL - SPFL Archive". SPFL.
(C) Champions

== Results ==
Home \ Away	ABE	AIR	AYR	CEL	CLY	DUM	DND	FAL	HAM	HOM	HIB	KIL	MOR	MOT	PAR	QPA	RAI	RAN	STM	THI
Aberdeen		1–2	1–0	0–0	0–1	2–4	5–1	0–1	0–1	2–0	2–1	1–1	1–1	0–1	2–0	2–4	1–2	3–1	1–1	0–1
Airdrieonians	3–1		1–0	1–2	3–0	2–1	2–3	1–0	2–2	3–2	3–1	3–2	2–1	3–1	3–1	3–0	2–0	2–0	7–0	1–0
Ayr United	1–0	1–1		0–1	1–1	3–1	1–2	2–2	1–1	2–0	2–1	0–2	0–3	1–2	0–0	1–1	2–1	1–3	2–1	0–1
Celtic	1–0	3–1	5–0		0–0	1–1	2–0	2–0	6–1	1–0	3–1	0–2	0–0	1–0	0–0	3–2	5–0	0–0	3–0	2–0
Clyde	2–0	1–1	1–4	0–5		2–2	2–0	1–1	1–1	0–1	1–2	1–1	1–0	0–1	2–1	1–1	2–0	0–1	2–1	1–1
Dumbarton	1–1	1–1	3–1	1–3	5–1		4–3	1–1	0–0	4–1	2–1	1–1	1–4	3–1	2–1	0–2	2–2	0–3	2–1	2–3
Dundee	1–1	2–2	2–1	1–2	0–1	4–1		1–2	3–1	2–3	3–1	0–2	3–1	0–2	5–1	2–1	6–2	2–1	0–2	0–1
Falkirk	4–2	0–0	1–2	1–1	3–3	2–3	2–0		4–0	2–1	0–1	2–0	2–1	3–1	0–1	1–2	1–1	0–2	0–2	1–1
Hamilton Academical	4–1	1–0	2–1	0–4	2–1	3–1	2–4	1–1		1–0	4–1	3–0	0–1	2–4	0–1	2–0	3–1	3–1	1–1	1–1
Heart of Midlothian	2–0	1–4	1–2	0–1	0–3	0–1	1–0	1–6	3–1		2–1	0–0	4–1	1–3	1–0	2–0	2–1	1–3	1–2	2–1
Hibernian	3–3	1–1	1–4	0–1	1–1	3–1	1–2	1–2	4–3	0–2		2–1	2–4	2–3	1–0	5–1	3–3	0–0	2–1	1–1
Kilmarnock	7–0	1–3	1–2	2–2	2–0	0–0	3–0	4–1	4–0	3–0	1–3		3–2	3–0	0–1	4–2	3–0	4–1	1–4	2–1
Morton	2–0	2–1	2–0	0–1	3–1	3–1	1–0	2–0	3–0	3–2	1–1	2–1		2–1	3–2	4–2	7–0	1–0	0–3	3–0
Motherwell	1–2	1–0	2–1	0–4	3–3	3–0	4–2	1–0	2–2	2–0	1–1	0–1	0–2		2–3	4–1	2–2	2–1	2–1	0–2
Partick Thistle	4–0	0–0	3–0	0–2	1–0	6–0	3–0	1–0	5–0	0–0	0–3	1–1	0–0	1–1		0–2	2–0	0–1	0–1	1–0
Queen's Park	2–1	0–5	3–2	1–3	2–2	1–0	2–2	1–1	4–2	1–1	4–1	0–1	3–4	0–0	2–1		3–1	1–4	1–2	3–4
Raith Rovers	3–0	0–2	1–3	1–4	1–1	0–3	3–2	0–6	0–1	1–4	2–1	0–4	1–2	2–1	3–1	2–0		1–4	1–1	0–1
Rangers	1–0	3–0	1–0	0–0	1–0	6–0	3–0	3–1	2–0	1–0	5–1	3–0	0–1	2–1	3–0	1–0	4–3		1–0	0–2
St Mirren	1–0	1–0	0–0	1–5	0–1	0–0	2–0	5–0	2–2	0–1	1–1	2–1	0–0	3–1	1–2	3–0	0–0	1–1		2–0
Third Lanark	2–0	1–0	4–3	0–0	1–0	1–1	0–0	5–4	3–1	1–1	1–1	3–0	0–0	2–1	2–0	4–1	0–1	1–1	1–0	

Legend: Blue = home team win; Yellow = draw; Red = away team win.

== See also ==
- 1916–17 in Scottish football
