= 1925–26 Scottish Division One =

27th season of top-tier football league in Scotland

Scottish Division One
- Season: 1925–26
- Champions: Celtic
- Relegated: Raith Rovers; Clydebank

The 1925–26 Scottish Division One season was won by Celtic by eight points over nearest rival Airdrieonians. Raith Rovers and Clydebank finished 19th and 20th respectively and were relegated to the 1926–27 Scottish Division Two.

== League table ==
Pos	Team	Pld	W	D	L	GF	GA	GD	Pts
1	Celtic	38	25	8	5	97	40	+57	58
2	Airdrieonians	38	23	4	11	95	54	+41	50
3	Heart of Midlothian	38	21	8	9	87	56	+31	50
4	St Mirren	38	20	7	11	63	52	+11	47
5	Motherwell	38	19	8	11	67	46	+21	46
6	Rangers	38	19	6	13	79	55	+24	44
7	Cowdenbeath	38	18	6	14	87	68	+19	42
8	Falkirk	38	14	14	10	61	57	+4	42
9	Kilmarnock	38	17	7	14	79	77	+2	41
10	Dundee	38	14	9	15	47	59	−12	37
11	Aberdeen	38	13	10	15	49	54	−5	36
12	Hamilton Academical	38	13	9	16	68	79	−11	35
13	Queen's Park	38	15	4	19	70	81	−11	34
14	Partick Thistle	38	10	13	15	64	73	−9	33
15	Morton	38	12	7	19	57	84	−27	31
16	Hibernian	38	12	6	20	72	77	−5	30
17	Dundee United	38	11	6	21	52	74	−22	28
18	St Johnstone	38	9	10	19	43	78	−35	28
19	Raith Rovers	38	11	4	23	46	81	−35	26
20	Clydebank	38	7	8	23	55	92	−37	22

Source: "1925-1926 Division 1 - SPFL Archive". SPFL.

== Results ==
Home \ Away	ABE	AIR	CEL	CLB	COW	DND	DNU	FAL	HAM	HOM	HIB	KIL	MOR	MOT	PAR	QPA	RAI	RAN	STJ	STM
Aberdeen		3–1	2–4	4–1	2–1	2–1	1–0	0–0	3–3	0–2	5–0	3–2	1–2	1–0	0–0	3–1	1–1	3–1	0–1	1–2
Airdrieonians	4–1		5–1	2–0	3–2	4–1	0–1	1–1	2–1	2–2	5–1	3–2	1–2	2–0	1–3	1–1	6–0	2–1	7–1	2–1
Celtic	4–1	3–2		1–1	6–1	0–0	6–2	3–1	2–0	3–0	5–0	0–0	3–1	3–1	3–0	4–1	1–0	2–2	4–1	6–1
Clydebank	0–0	0–1	1–2		3–4	1–2	6–1	2–3	1–4	1–5	0–1	5–1	2–1	1–1	3–2	3–0	2–3	3–2	2–0	1–2
Cowdenbeath	2–1	1–0	1–1	5–2		5–0	5–1	3–0	4–0	1–2	3–1	1–0	5–1	2–2	3–1	7–3	2–1	2–3	1–0	1–1
Dundee	3–2	0–1	1–2	3–1	4–3		0–0	1–0	2–2	1–0	1–4	1–0	3–0	1–2	3–1	2–1	1–1	1–5	0–1	1–1
Dundee United	2–0	1–2	1–0	5–0	1–2	0–1		1–2	2–5	2–3	2–2	3–1	2–2	1–1	1–0	1–2	3–1	2–1	0–0	1–2
Falkirk	2–1	2–1	1–1	2–2	1–1	1–0	1–1		1–0	3–3	1–1	6–1	2–0	3–3	2–2	1–1	3–0	1–1	2–1	0–1
Hamilton Academical	1–1	3–4	1–3	2–0	2–1	0–0	3–1	1–1		3–0	1–0	2–2	2–5	0–2	2–1	1–0	3–1	3–3	7–2	3–2
Heart of Midlothian	1–0	0–2	1–2	7–0	4–3	2–2	1–0	1–1	4–0		1–4	1–0	6–1	3–1	3–0	4–2	5–1	3–0	4–2	1–0
Hibernian	0–0	1–4	4–4	5–1	1–1	2–1	3–5	3–1	8–4	0–0		8–0	4–1	3–1	3–4	1–2	2–0	0–2	0–3	0–2
Kilmarnock	3–0	3–2	2–1	2–2	1–1	5–2	2–3	2–3	4–1	5–1	2–1		2–0	1–2	3–3	2–1	3–0	2–2	3–2	2–3
Morton	2–0	3–2	0–5	2–2	3–4	3–0	3–1	3–1	3–1	1–1	2–5	1–2		1–1	1–1	2–0	1–0	1–3	3–1	0–0
Motherwell	1–1	2–1	2–1	2–1	2–1	2–0	4–0	3–0	1–0	3–1	2–1	1–2	4–1		1–0	1–0	5–0	1–3	4–1	0–0
Partick Thistle	2–2	2–3	0–0	2–2	3–1	0–1	2–0	2–3	3–3	1–4	2–1	2–4	3–3	2–1		3–3	2–1	2–0	3–1	3–2
Queen's Park	0–1	1–5	1–4	4–1	3–4	1–3	2–1	3–1	6–2	3–4	2–0	2–2	3–1	0–3	2–1		4–0	3–6	2–0	1–0
Raith Rovers	0–1	2–1	1–2	2–0	2–1	1–0	4–2	1–4	0–2	1–3	1–0	4–5	3–0	2–1	1–1	1–2		1–0	2–2	1–3
Rangers	0–1	1–2	1–0	3–1	3–0	1–2	2–1	2–3	2–0	2–2	3–1	3–0	4–1	1–0	2–1	1–2	4–2		0–1	4–1
St Johnstone	1–1	3–7	0–3	3–1	1–1	0–0	0–1	2–1	1–1	1–1	0–0	0–2	1–0	2–2	2–2	1–4	3–1	0–3		0–1
St Mirren	3–0	1–1	0–2	3–0	2–1	2–2	2–0	2–0	1–0	2–1	2–1	1–4	3–0	2–2	2–2	3–1	0–3	3–2	3–1	

Legend: Blue = home team win; Yellow = draw; Red = away team win.
