= 1920–21 Scottish Football League =

Scottish Football League
- Season: 1920–21
- Champions: Rangers
- Relegated: N/A

Statistics of the Scottish Football League in season 1920–21. The competition was won by Rangers by ten points over nearest rival Celtic.

== League table ==
Pos	Team	Pld	W	D	L	GF	GA	GD	Pts
1	Rangers (C)	42	35	6	1	91	24	+67	76
2	Celtic	42	30	6	6	89	31	+58	66
3	Heart of Midlothian	42	20	10	12	74	49	+25	50
4	Dundee	42	19	11	12	54	48	+6	49
5	Motherwell	42	19	10	13	75	51	+24	48
6	Partick Thistle	42	17	12	13	53	39	+14	46
7	Clyde	42	21	3	18	63	62	+1	45
8	Third Lanark	42	19	6	17	74	61	+13	44
9	Morton	42	15	14	13	66	58	+8	44
10	Airdrieonians	42	17	9	16	71	64	+7	43
11	Kilmarnock	42	17	8	17	62	68	−6	42
12	Aberdeen	42	14	14	14	53	54	−1	42
13	Hibernian	42	16	9	17	58	57	+1	41
14	Hamilton Academical	42	14	12	16	44	57	−13	40
15	Ayr United	42	14	12	16	62	69	−7	40
16	Raith Rovers	42	16	5	21	54	58	−4	37
17	Falkirk	42	11	12	19	54	72	−18	34
18	Albion Rovers	42	11	12	19	57	68	−11	34
19	Queen's Park	42	11	11	20	45	80	−35	33
20	Clydebank	42	7	14	21	47	72	−25	28
21	Dumbarton	42	10	4	28	41	89	−48	24
22	St Mirren	42	7	4	31	43	92	−49	18

(C) Champions

== Results ==
Home \ Away	ABE	AIR	ALB	AYR	CEL	CLY	CLB	DUM	DND	FAL	HAM	HOM	HIB	KIL	MOR	MOT	PAR	QPA	RAI	RAN	STM	THI
Aberdeen		1–0	1–0	0–0	1–2	3–0	4–0	2–0	0–0	1–1	3–1	5–2	0–1	1–1	0–1	1–1	0–3	2–2	1–0	1–1	3–1	0–1
Airdrieonians	5–2		5–1	1–2	2–3	5–1	2–1	1–1	1–1	1–1	1–3	0–1	5–1	3–0	3–2	1–1	1–2	4–1	3–1	0–3	1–1	1–3
Albion Rovers	0–2	1–1		1–2	0–1	5–2	1–1	3–0	2–3	3–1	3–4	1–1	0–2	2–0	3–2	1–1	0–0	2–1	0–1	1–2	1–2	1–2
Ayr United	2–2	1–2	3–0		3–1	1–3	5–1	3–0	1–1	2–2	1–1	0–0	2–1	0–0	0–2	0–0	2–1	3–0	1–0	1–1	4–2	5–1
Celtic	3–1	2–1	0–2	3–1		1–0	1–1	1–1	2–0	4–1	2–1	3–2	3–0	2–0	1–1	1–0	1–0	5–1	5–0	1–2	6–0	3–0
Clyde	2–0	3–0	2–0	3–1	2–1		4–0	2–1	5–2	1–1	1–0	2–1	2–0	1–2	0–0	1–0	2–1	2–0	2–1	1–3	3–1	2–2
Clydebank	1–1	1–2	4–1	2–0	0–2	1–0		1–2	0–1	1–2	1–1	1–2	2–2	2–2	3–1	1–2	1–1	2–0	1–1	2–4	3–4	3–0
Dumbarton	0–1	1–2	0–4	0–1	1–3	0–2	1–0		1–1	4–1	3–0	0–3	1–0	1–0	1–2	2–0	0–1	4–0	2–0	2–5	1–0	0–1
Dundee	1–1	0–1	3–0	2–0	1–2	2–1	2–0	2–1		2–0	4–0	3–0	1–1	3–1	0–0	2–1	1–0	1–1	0–0	1–2	2–0	2–1
Falkirk	0–0	2–3	0–0	2–2	1–3	2–1	3–1	5–1	2–2		1–2	2–2	0–3	2–0	1–0	1–0	1–2	1–2	2–2	0–2	4–0	1–3
Hamilton Academical	0–2	0–0	0–0	3–0	1–1	2–1	0–0	1–1	1–0	2–0		3–1	1–1	2–0	4–2	1–4	1–0	0–1	0–0	0–1	3–0	1–1
Heart of Midlothian	0–0	2–1	1–1	4–1	0–1	6–0	2–0	6–2	3–1	0–2	3–0		5–1	4–1	0–1	1–0	1–0	4–0	2–0	0–4	1–0	3–0
Hibernian	2–3	0–2	5–2	3–2	0–3	0–1	1–1	2–0	2–0	0–0	0–1	3–0		0–0	4–0	2–3	2–0	0–2	1–1	1–1	1–0	2–1
Kilmarnock	1–0	2–0	3–1	2–1	3–2	0–1	2–2	4–1	5–0	2–0	5–0	1–2	1–3		3–1	0–3	0–1	1–1	1–0	1–2	3–2	3–2
Morton	6–1	0–0	1–3	0–0	1–1	2–1	1–1	4–1	1–0	2–0	0–1	1–1	1–1	9–2		4–1	4–0	4–3	1–3	0–0	1–0	1–1
Motherwell	4–0	1–0	1–1	6–1	1–1	3–1	0–0	8–2	1–2	4–2	2–0	2–2	4–2	0–1	2–2		0–4	2–1	2–1	0–2	2–0	1–3
Partick Thistle	2–2	0–0	0–0	0–0	0–1	2–1	2–2	1–0	2–1	2–1	1–1	0–0	3–2	1–1	4–0	0–0		5–0	3–1	0–2	5–1	1–0
Queen's Park	0–2	1–3	1–1	3–0	0–2	1–0	2–0	3–0	0–0	0–0	3–1	1–1	0–2	1–2	1–1	0–6	1–1		3–2	1–1	2–2	0–1
Raith Rovers	1–0	3–2	2–4	2–1	2–0	0–1	3–0	3–1	1–2	1–3	1–0	2–1	2–0	2–0	2–0	1–2	1–0	5–0		0–1	3–1	1–2
Rangers	2–1	4–1	2–1	7–2	0–2	3–1	1–0	2–0	5–0	2–0	4–0	0–0	1–0	2–0	2–0	2–1	3–0	3–1	1–0		2–0	2–1
St Mirren	1–1	0–1	1–2	1–4	0–2	3–2	3–0	4–1	0–1	2–3	1–0	0–4	0–2	1–2	2–2	1–2	0–2	1–2	3–2	0–1		1–3
Third Lanark	3–1	7–3	2–2	3–1	1–2	3–0	1–3	4–0	0–1	5–0	1–1	3–0	0–2	4–4	1–2	0–1	1–0	1–2	3–0	0–1	2–1	

Legend: Blue = home team win; Yellow = draw; Red = away team win.

== See also ==
- 1920–21 in Scottish football
