= 1917–18 Scottish Football League =

Scottish Football League
- Season: 1917–18
- Champions: Rangers
- Relegated: N/A

Statistics of the Scottish Football League in season 1917–18. The competition was won by Rangers by one point over nearest rival Celtic.

== League table ==
Pos	Team	Pld	W	D	L	GF	GA	GD	Pts
1	Rangers (C)	34	25	6	3	66	24	+42	56
2	Celtic	34	24	7	3	66	26	+40	55
3	Kilmarnock	34	19	5	10	69	41	+28	43
4	Morton	34	17	9	8	53	42	+11	43
5	Motherwell	34	16	9	9	70	51	+19	41
6	Partick Thistle	34	14	12	8	51	37	+14	40
7	Dumbarton	34	13	8	13	48	49	−1	34
7	Queen's Park	34	14	6	14	64	63	+1	34
9	Clydebank	34	14	5	15	55	56	−1	33
10	Hearts	34	14	4	16	41	58	−17	32
11	St Mirren	34	11	7	16	42	50	−8	29
12	Hamilton Academical	34	11	6	17	52	63	−11	28
13	Third Lanark	34	10	7	17	56	62	−6	27
14	Falkirk	34	9	9	16	38	58	−20	27
15	Airdrieonians	34	10	6	18	46	58	−12	26
16	Hibernian	34	8	9	17	42	57	−15	25
17	Clyde	34	9	2	23	37	72	−35	20
18	Ayr United	34	5	9	20	32	61	−29	19

(C) Champions

== Results ==
Home \ Away	AIR	AYR	CEL	CLY	CLB	DUM	FAL	HAM	HOM	HIB	KIL	MOR	MOT	PAR	QPA	RAN	STM	THI
Airdrieonians		4–1	2–0	3–0	1–2	0–0	3–1	2–1	0–1	3–0	0–1	1–1	3–1	0–1	2–4	1–2	1–0	0–3
Ayr United	1–2		1–2	1–3	1–2	0–1	4–0	2–0	1–1	2–2	0–3	0–1	1–3	0–0	2–3	0–2	2–1	2–2
Celtic	3–3	4–0		3–2	3–0	3–0	0–0	1–0	3–0	2–0	2–3	2–0	1–1	2–1	3–0	0–0	1–0	1–3
Clyde	3–1	4–0	1–4		0–3	0–4	1–0	1–3	3–0	2–5	1–2	0–2	0–2	0–0	1–1	0–3	1–2	2–0
Clydebank	3–3	3–1	1–2	0–4		1–2	1–1	2–1	3–1	2–0	1–0	1–2	1–2	1–2	3–1	1–1	4–1	2–2
Dumbarton	2–0	1–0	0–2	3–1	2–3		4–1	1–2	1–1	1–0	1–4	0–3	4–3	1–1	2–1	2–4	5–2	0–1
Falkirk	4–3	3–0	1–3	4–0	0–4	1–1		2–1	4–0	2–2	1–0	0–3	1–1	1–1	1–1	2–0	1–0	1–1
Hamilton Academical	1–1	0–3	1–2	2–0	3–3	2–0	1–1		3–0	1–0	4–1	2–1	3–3	2–2	1–2	1–2	2–1	4–0
Heart of Midlothian	1–0	2–0	0–1	3–0	1–0	1–2	0–2	3–2		1–0	3–0	1–0	0–1	1–1	2–1	0–3	2–1	3–1
Hibernian	3–1	1–1	0–2	2–0	0–1	0–3	2–1	1–1	1–3		0–3	2–2	2–2	2–1	4–2	0–1	3–1	4–1
Kilmarnock	3–0	2–0	1–3	4–0	4–2	0–0	3–0	2–3	4–3	3–1		4–0	4–0	0–0	3–1	0–1	5–1	3–1
Morton	0–3	1–0	1–1	2–0	2–1	2–2	1–0	3–0	1–1	1–1	2–2		2–0	1–3	2–1	1–1	3–1	2–0
Motherwell	2–0	5–1	3–4	1–3	4–1	0–0	2–1	3–0	4–0	2–1	1–1	1–3		4–1	6–3	0–0	2–1	3–1
Partick Thistle	2–1	1–3	0–0	3–0	2–0	0–0	1–0	5–0	4–1	2–2	0–3	3–3	1–0		5–1	2–0	2–0	3–5
Queen's Park	3–0	0–0	0–2	4–2	3–1	2–0	5–0	2–1	4–0	2–0	3–0	3–0	2–2	2–0		2–3	1–1	3–3
Rangers	4–0	0–0	1–2	2–1	1–0	2–1	4–1	4–2	2–0	3–0	3–0	4–2	2–1	1–0	3–0		2–0	4–2
St Mirren	2–0	1–1	0–0	0–1	3–1	2–1	1–0	5–1	3–2	1–1	2–0	0–1	1–1	0–0	3–1	0–0		3–1
Third Lanark	2–2	1–1	0–2	3–0	0–1	4–1	4–0	2–1	2–3	1–0	1–1	1–2	2–4	0–1	5–0	0–1	1–2	

Legend: Blue = home team win; Yellow = draw; Red = away team win.

== See also ==
- 1917–18 in Scottish football
