= Clydeholm =

Venue in West Dunbartonshire, Scotland

- Location within West Dunbartonshire
- Location: Clydebank, Scotland
- Coordinates: 55.8928°N 4.3880°W
- Surface: Grass
- Record attendance: 22,000

Construction
- Opened: 1914
- Closed: 1963

Tenant
- Clydebank F.C. (1914–1931)

Clydeholm was a football and greyhound racing stadium in Clydebank, Scotland. It was the home ground of the first Clydebank F.C. to play in the Scottish Football League.

== History ==
Clydebank F.C. was founded in 1914, and acquired a ten-year lease on a site directly to the west of Yoker railway station. The new club was immediately elected into the Division Two of the Scottish Football League, and the first SFL match was played at Clydeholm on 16 August 1914, a 3–1 win over East Stirlingshire.

The ground's record league attendance of 22,000 was set for a match against Rangers on 13 November 1920, with the away team winning 4–2. It was equalled for the home match against Rangers at the start of the following season, with Rangers winning 7–1, Clydebank's record home defeat at the ground.

In 1925 a new grandstand was erected on the south-western side of the pitch. A greyhound racing track was installed, with the first race taking place on 15 May 1930. Clydebank resigned from the SFL in July 1931 – their final SFL match at Clydeholm was a 5–1 defeat by Raith Rovers on 25 April 1931. Although the club folded in the same year, the ground continued to be used for greyhound racing. During World War II it was used to house a temporary mortuary, which was destroyed on the first night of the Clydebank Blitz in March 1941.

The final greyhound racing meeting took place on 28 November 1963. The stadium was subsequently demolished and the site used to build a shopping centre and housing, with one of the roads through it named Clydeholm Terrace.
