= Clydebank F.C. (1914) =

Former association football club in UK

Clydebank
- Full name: Clydebank Football Club
- Founded: 1914
- Dissolved: 1931
- Ground: Clydeholm, Clydebank
Home colours

Clydebank Football Club was a football club based in Clydebank, Dunbartonshire, Scotland. The first club to represent Clydebank — which was a rapidly developing industrial "boom town" at this time — in the Scottish Football League (SFL), the second senior Clydebank F.C. were newly formed when elected to Division Two in 1914. The lower division closed down a year later due to the impact of the First World War, but after two years playing in the Western League they were elevated directly to the top flight, three clubs from the north and east of the country having been forced to stand down for the duration of the war due to travel difficulties. The economic boost the war had given to Clydebank's shipyards and factories was probably a contributory factor to the local team being chosen to fill the vacancy.

The club lasted five seasons before being relegated in 1922. They were immediately promoted back to Division One but relegated again after one season. The economic downturn in the latter half of the 1920s affected the town and the club badly, to the extent that the club considered resigning from league football in 1929. They chose to continue at that time but it proved to be only a stay of execution, with financial difficulties forcing the club to drop out of the League, and subsequently disband, in July 1931.

Throughout their existence, they played at Clydeholm, which continued to exist after their demise as a venue for greyhound racing. Clydeholm was demolished in the early 1960s and replaced with a shopping centre and housing. The most famous player to appear for the club was Jimmy McGrory, the Scottish League's all-time record goalscorer, who spent the 1923–24 season on loan to Clydebank from Celtic, scoring 13 of his 397 career league goals while at Clydeholm.

Honours

- Scottish League Division Two:
- Runners-up (2): 1922–23, 1924–25

== Sources ==
- Crampsey, Bob (1990). The First 100 Years. Glasgow: Scottish Football League. ISBN 0-9516433-0-4.
