= Jock Wilson (English footballer) =

English footballer

Personal information
- Full name: John Wilson
- Date of birth: 1894
- Place of birth: Sunderland, England
- Date of death: 4 July 1957 (aged 62–63)
- Place of death: Dechmont, Scotland
- Height: 5 ft 9 in (1.75 m)
- Position: Left back

Senior career*
Years	Team	Apps	(Gls)
–1914	Newmilns		
1914–1925	Heart of Midlothian	226	(0)
1925–1928	Dunfermline Athletic	108	(9)
1928–1931	Hamilton Academical	91	(7)
1931–1932	St Johnstone	36	(0)
- Penicuik Athletic

International career
1916	Scottish League XI (wartime)	1	(0)
- * Club domestic league appearances and goals

John Wilson (1894 – 4 July 1957) was an English professional footballer who played as a left back and made over 460 appearances in the Scottish League for Heart of Midlothian, Dunfermline Athletic, Hamilton Academical and St Johnstone. He made one wartime appearance for the Scottish League XI. After retiring as a player, Wilson was involved in the founding of Junior club Haddington Athletic in the late 1930s.

== Personal life ==
Wilson's father Hughie was a Scottish international footballer who was playing for Sunderland at the time of Wilson's birth. The family eventually moved back to Scotland and settled in Newmilns. After enlisting in April 1916, Wilson served as a private in the Royal Scots during the First World War and was wounded on the Western Front in April 1917 and March 1918. As a teenager, Wilson had trained as a lace weaver and he returned to the profession in Ayrshire part-time after the war, before re-entering professional football. He worked at Castle Mills Rubber Works in Fountainbridge during the early years of the First World War and after retiring from football, he ran a fishmongers in Haddington.

== Career statistics ==
Appearances and goals by club, season and competition
Club	Season	League			Scottish Cup		Other		Total	
Club	Season	Division	Apps	Goals	Apps	Goals	Apps	Goals	Apps	Goals
Heart of Midlothian	1914–15	Scottish Division One	1	0	—		1 (Note: Appearance in East of Scotland Shield)	0	2	0
Heart of Midlothian	1915–16	Scottish Division One	37	0	—		3 (Note: 2 appearances in Rosebery Charity Cup, 1 appearance in Wilson Cup)	0	40	0
Heart of Midlothian	1916–17	Scottish Division One	5	0	—		0	0	5	0
Heart of Midlothian	1918–19	Scottish Division One	23	0	—		6 (Note: 4 appearances in Victory Cup, 1 appearance in East of Scotland Shield, 1 appearance in Wilson Cup)	0	29	0
Heart of Midlothian	1919–20	Scottish Division One	27	0	3	0	0	0	30	0
Heart of Midlothian	1920–21	Scottish Division One	29	0	5	0	0	0	34	0
Heart of Midlothian	1921–22	Scottish Division One	10	0	3	0	1 (Note: Appearance in Dunedin Cup)	0	14	0
Heart of Midlothian	1922–23	Scottish Division One	33	0	2	0	6 (Note: 2 appearances in Wilson Cup, 2 appearances in Rosebery Charity Cup, 1 appearance in East of Scotland Shield, 1 appearance in Dunedin Cup)	0	41	0
Heart of Midlothian	1923–24	Scottish Division One	37	0	5	0	3 (Note: 2 appearances in East of Scotland Shield, 1 appearance in Rosebery Charity Cup)	0	45	0
Heart of Midlothian	1924–25	Scottish Division One	24	0	2	0	2 (Note: 1 appearance in East of Scotland Shield, 1 appearance in Wilson Cup)	0	28	0
Heart of Midlothian	Total		226	0	20	0	22	0	268	0
Dunfermline Athletic	1925–26	Scottish Division Two	36	2	1	0	—		37	2
Dunfermline Athletic	1926–27	Scottish Division One	35	3	4	1	—		39	4
Dunfermline Athletic	1927–28	Scottish Division One	37	4	4	1	—		41	5
Dunfermline Athletic	Total		108	9	9	2	—		117	11
Hamilton Academical	1928–29	Scottish Division One	22	1	3	0	0	0	25	1
Hamilton Academical	1929–30	Scottish Division One	34	3	5	1	1 (Note: Appearance in Lanarkshire Cup)	0	40	4
Hamilton Academical	1930–31	Scottish Division One	35	3	3	0	0	0	38	3
Hamilton Academical	Total		91	7	11	1	1	0	113	8
St Johnstone	1931–32	Scottish Division Two	36	0	3	0	—		39	0
Career total			461	16	43	3	23	0	527	19

== Honours ==
Heart of Midlothian

- East of Scotland Shield: 1914–15, 1918–19
- Wilson Cup: 1918–19, 1922–23
- Rosebery Charity Cup: 1915–16, 1922–23, 1923–24

Dunfermline Athletic

- Scottish League Second Division: 1925–26

St Johnstone

- Scottish League Second Division second-place promotion: 1931–32

== See also ==
- Heart of Midlothian F.C. and World War I
