= Bob Birrell (footballer) =

Scottish footballer

Personal information
- Full name: Robert Birrell
- Date of birth: 6 October 1890
- Place of birth: Crossgates, Scotland
- Date of death: 23 January 1956 (aged 65)
- Place of death: Halbeath, Scotland
- Position: Full back

Senior career*
Years	Team	Apps	(Gls)
–1912	Kingseat Athletic		
1912–1918	Cowdenbeath	99	(7)
1918–1922	Heart of Midlothian	113	(0)
1922	St Mirren	2	(0)

International career
1921	Scottish League XI	1	(0)
- * Club domestic league appearances and goals

Robert Birrell (6 October 1890 – 23 January 1956) was a Scottish professional footballer who played in the Scottish League for Heart of Midlothian, Cowdenbeath and St Mirren as a full back. He represented the Scottish League XI and was later one of the founders of Crossgates Primrose.

== Personal life ==
Birrell's younger brother Billy also became a footballer.

== Career statistics ==
Appearances and goals by club, season and competition
Club	Season	League			Scottish Cup		Other		Total	
Club	Season	Division	Apps	Goals	Apps	Goals	Apps	Goals	Apps	Goals
Cowdenbeath	1910–11	Scottish Division Two	18	0	6	0	—		24	0
Cowdenbeath	1911–12	Scottish Division Two	17	0	5	0	—		22	0
Cowdenbeath	1912–13	Scottish Division Two	21	0	4	0	—		25	0
Cowdenbeath	1913–14	Scottish Division Two	19	3	5	0	—		24	3
Cowdenbeath	1914–15	Scottish Division Two	24	4	2	0	—		26	4
Cowdenbeath	Total		99	7	22	0	—		121	7
Heart of Midlothian	1918–19	Scottish Division One	27	0	0	0	7 (Note: 2 appearances in East of Scotland Shield, 2 appearances in Wilson Cup, 1 appearance in Victory Cup, 1 appearance in Rosebery Charity Cup)	0	34	0
Heart of Midlothian	1919–20	Scottish Division One	26	0	2	0	2 (Note: 1 appearance in Wilson Cup, 1 appearance in War Memorial Fund)	0	30	0
Heart of Midlothian	1920–21	Scottish Division One	29	0	7	0	6 (Note: 2 appearances in East of Scotland Shield, 2 appearances in Dunedin Cup, 1 appearance in Wilson Cup, 1 appearance in Rosebery Charity Cup)	0	42	0
Heart of Midlothian	1921–22	Scottish Division One	31	0	3	1	3 (Note: 1 appearance in East of Scotland Shield, 1 appearance in Dunedin Cup, 1 appearance in Rosebery Charity Cup)	0	37	1
Heart of Midlothian	Total		113	0	12	1	18	0	143	1
St Mirren	1922–23	Scottish Division One	2	0	0	0	—		2	0
Career total			113	0	12	1	18	0	143	1

== Honours ==
Cowdenbeath

- Scottish League Division Two (2): 1913–14, 1914–15
- Eastern League (2): 1916–17, 1917–18

Heart of Midlothian

- East of Scotland Shield (1): 1920–21
- Wilson Cup (2): 1918–19, 1919–20
- Rosebery Charity Cup (2): 1918–19, 1920–21

Individual

- Cowdenbeath Hall of Fame
