= 1933–34 Heart of Midlothian F.C. season =

Heart of Midlothian
1933–34 season
- Manager: Willie McCartney
- Stadium: Tynecastle Park
- Scottish First Division: 6th
- Scottish Cup: Round 3

During the 1933–34 season Hearts competed in the Scottish First Division, the Scottish Cup and the East of Scotland Shield.

== Fixtures ==
=== Friendlies ===
4 September 1933 Friendly	Rosslyn Juniors	5–1	Hearts
	Goal			Attendance: 1,500

9 October 1933 Friendly	Hearts	3–0	Chile-Peru XI	Tynecastle Park
	Goal			Attendance: 6,000

17 April 1934 Friendly	Border Select	0–1	Hearts	Raidstane Park
	Goal

23 April 1934 Friendly	Inverness Select	1–4	Hearts
	Goal

24 April 1934 Friendly	Ross County	5–1	Hearts	Victoria Park
	Goal			Attendance: 1,600

25 April 1934 Friendly	Moray and Nairn Select	1–10	Hearts
	Goal			Attendance: 2,950

=== Wilson Cup ===
30 April 1934 Final	Hibernian	0–2	Hearts	Easter Road
	Goal			Attendance: 5,000

=== East of Scotland Shield ===
16 August 1933 Semi-Final	Hearts	3–2	St Bernard's	Tynecastle Park
				Attendance: 5,000

10 February 1934 Final	Hearts	4–0	Hibernian	Tynecastle Park
				Attendance: 15,000

=== Rosebery Charity Cup ===
9 May 1934 Semi-Final	Hearts	1–0	Leith Athletic	Tynecastle Park
	Goal			Attendance: 3,000

12 May 1934 Final	Hearts	2–1	Hibernian	Tynecastle Park
	Goal			Attendance: 4,919

=== Stirling Charity Cup ===
5 May 1934 Stirling Charity Cup Final	King's Park	1–1	Hearts	Forthbank Park

=== Scottish Cup ===
20 January 1934 Scottish Cup R1	Hearts	5–1	Montrose	Tynecastle Park
				Attendance: 8,992

3 February 1934 Scottish Cup R2	Queen's Park	1–2	Hearts	Hampden Park
				Attendance: 19,796

17 February 1934 Scottish Cup R3	Rangers	0–0	Hearts	Ibrox Park
				Attendance: 67,543

21 February 1934 Scottish Cup R3 Replay	Hearts	1–2	Rangers	Tynecastle Park
				Attendance: 48,895

=== Scottish First Division ===
12 August 1933 Scottish First Division	Hearts	6–0	St Mirren	Tynecastle Park
				Attendance: 21,277

19 August 1933 Scottish First Division	Ayr United	4–3	Hearts	Somerset Park
				Attendance: 7,000

22 August 1933 Scottish First Division	Hearts	4–2	Hamilton Academical	Tynecastle Park
				Attendance: 11,511

26 August 1933 Scottish First Division	Hearts	5–1	Third Lanark	Tynecastle Park
				Attendance: 14,358

2 September 1933 Scottish First Division	Celtic	0–0	Hearts	Celtic Park
				Attendance: 20,000

9 September 1933 Scottish First Division	Hearts	0–0	Hibernian	Tynecastle Park
				Attendance: 32,853

12 September 1933 Scottish First Division	Queen's Park	1–1	Hearts	Hampden Park
				Attendance: 7,000

23 September 1933 Scottish First Division	Hearts	5–4	Cowdenbeath	Tynecastle Park
				Attendance: 12,496

30 September 1933 Scottish First Division	Dundee	0–1	Hearts	Dens Park
				Attendance: 12,000

7 October 1933 Scottish First Division	Hearts	1–0	Partick Thistle	Tynecastle Park
				Attendance: 15,391

14 October 1933 Scottish First Division	Motherwell	2–1	Hearts	Fir Park
				Attendance: 12,000

21 October 1933 Scottish First Division	Rangers	3–1	Hearts	Ibrox Park
				Attendance: 30,000

28 October 1933 Scottish First Division	Hearts	3–1	Falkirk	Tynecastle Park
				Attendance: 11,973

4 November 1933 Scottish First Division	Hamilton Academical	1–1	Hearts	Douglas Park
				Attendance: 3,000

11 November 1933 Scottish First Division	Hearts	4–0	Queen's Park	Tynecastle Park
				Attendance: 15,493

18 November 1933 Scottish First Division	Hearts	1–3	Queen of the South	Tynecastle Park
				Attendance: 7,810

25 November 1933 Scottish First Division	Hearts	1–1	Clyde	Tynecastle Park
				Attendance: 12,605

2 December 1933 Scottish First Division	Kilmarnock	2–5	Hearts	Rugby Park
				Attendance: 6,471

9 December 1933 Scottish First Division	Hearts	0–0	Aberdeen	Tynecastle Park
				Attendance: 15,518

8 December 1934 Scottish First Division	St Johnstone	3–1	Hearts	Muirton Park
				Attendance: 6,000

23 December 1933 Scottish First Division	St Mirren	1–1	Hearts	St Mirren Park, Love Street
				Attendance: 6,000

25 December 1933 Scottish First Division	Hearts	8–1	Airdrieonians	Tynecastle Park
				Attendance: 7,256

30 December 1933 Scottish First Division	Hearts	1–1	Ayr United	Tynecastle Park
				Attendance: 10,260

1 January 1934 Scottish First Division	Hibernian	1–4	Hearts	Easter Road
				Attendance: 30,000

2 January 1934 Scottish First Division	Hearts	6–1	Dundee	Tynecastle Park
				Attendance: 15,732

6 January 1934 Scottish First Division	Third Lanark	1–1	Hearts	Cathkin Park
				Attendance: 4,000

13 January 1934 Scottish First Division	Hearts	2–1	Celtic	Tynecastle Park
				Attendance: 25,422

27 January 1934 Scottish First Division	Cowdenbeath	1–5	Hearts	Central Park
				Attendance: 3,000

24 February 1934 Scottish First Division	Partick Thistle	7–2	Hearts	Firhill Park
				Attendance: 5,000

10 March 1934 Scottish First Division	Hearts	1–2	Rangers	Tynecastle Park
				Attendance: 22,782

17 March 1934 Scottish First Division	Falkirk	2–1	Hearts	Brockville Park
				Attendance: 4,000

24 March 1934 Scottish First Division	Queen of the South	3–1	Hearts	Palmerston Park
				Attendance: 6,000

27 March 1934 Scottish First Division	Clyde	1–2	Hearts	Shawfield Stadium
				Attendance: 4,000

7 April 1934 Scottish First Division	Hearts	1–1	Kilmarnock	Tynecastle Park
				Attendance: 3,617

14 April 1934 Scottish First Division	Airdrieonians	3–2	Hearts	Broomfield Park
				Attendance: 2,000

16 April 1934 Scottish First Division	Hearts	1–3	Motherwell	Tynecastle Park
				Attendance: 11,017

21 April 1934 Scottish First Division	Aberdeen	0–1	Hearts	Pittodrie Park
				Attendance: 11,500

28 April 1934 Scottish First Division	Hearts	2–1	St Johnstone	Tynecastle Park
				Attendance: 6,052

== See also ==
- List of Heart of Midlothian F.C. seasons
