= Jack Cartmell =

English footballer (1890–1979)

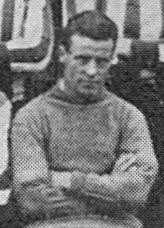
- Cartmell as assistant trainer with Brentford in 1927.

Personal information
- Full name: John Range Cartmell
- Date of birth: 28 August 1890
- Place of birth: Blackpool, England
- Date of death: 23 February 1979 (aged 88)
- Place of death: Richmond, England
- Position: Outside left

Senior career*
Years	Team	Apps	(Gls)
1911–1913	Huddersfield Town	0	(0)
1913–	Blackpool	0	(0)
- Mardy
- Abertillery
1916–1918	Heart of Midlothian	19	(2)
1919–1921	Brentford	64	(2)
1921–1923	Boscombe		
1923–1924	Gillingham	4	(0)
- * Club domestic league appearances and goals

John Range Cartmell (28 August 1890 – 23 February 1979) was a professional footballer who played in the Football League for Brentford and Gillingham as an outside left. He later became trainer at Brentford and served nearly 30 years in the role. He was posthumously inducted into the Brentford Hall of Fame in May 2015.

== Playing career ==
An outside left, Cartmell began his career with spells at Huddersfield Town, Blackpool, Mardy and Abertillery, before the outbreak of the First World War in 1914 saw the suspension of competitive football the following year. Cartmell guested for Heart of Midlothian during the war and made 23 appearances, scoring two goals.

After the armistice, Cartmell joined Southern League First Division club Brentford in 1919. He made 30 appearances during the Bees' first season of league football in 1920–21, before leaving at the end of the campaign. Cartmell ended his career with Southern League club Boscombe and made a brief return to the Football League with Gillingham during the 1923–24 season.

== Trainer career ==
After his retirement as a player in 1924, Cartmell remained at Gillingham as assistant to trainer Bob Kane. Cartmell returned to Brentford in 1926, when he followed Kane, manager Harry Curtis and a number of Gillingham players to Griffin Park. He progressed to become the club's lead trainer and remained with the Bees until the mid-1950s. Cartmell was rewarded for his long service with a testimonial match against Hayes in April 1955. He became trainer of Athenian League club Hayes in the mid-1950s.

== Personal life ==
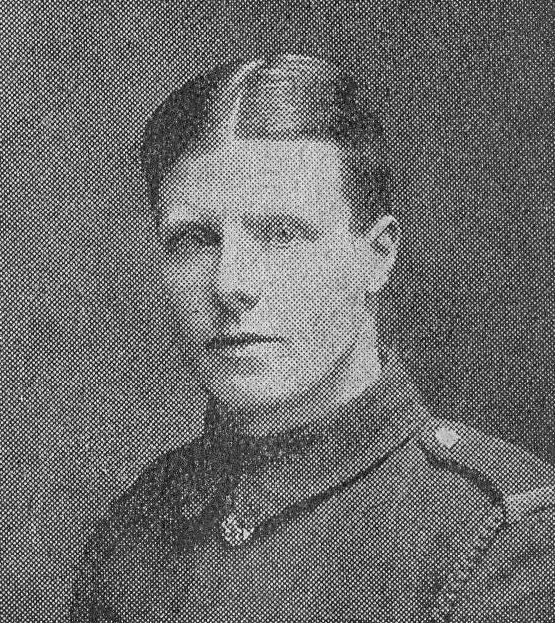
Cartmell in uniform during the First World War.

Cartmell served in the Sportsmen's Battalions of the Royal Fusiliers during the First World War.

== Career statistics ==
Appearances and goals by club, season and competition
Club	Season	League			National cup (Note: Includes Scottish Cup, FA Cup)		Other		Total	
Club	Season	Division	Apps	Goals	Apps	Goals	Apps	Goals	Apps	Goals
Heart of Midlothian	1916–17	Scottish League First Division	19	2	—		3 (Note: 2 appearances in Rosebery Charity Cup, 1 appearance in Wilson Cup)	0	22	2
Heart of Midlothian	1917–18	Scottish League First Division	0	0	—		1 (Note: Appearance in Dunedin Cup)	0	1	0
Heart of Midlothian	Total		19	2	—		4	0	23	2
Brentford	1919–20	Southern League First Division	35	2	1	0	—		36	2
Brentford	1920–21	Third Division	29	0	1	0	—		30	0
Brentford	Total		64	2	2	0	—		66	2
Gillingham	1923–24	Third Division South	4	0	1	0	—		5	0
Career Total			87	4	3	0	4	0	94	4

== Honours ==
Heart of Midlothian

- Rosebery Charity Cup: 1916–17

Individual

- Brentford Hall of Fame
