= Denied (disambiguation) =

Denied is that which has been given a denial.

Denied may also refer to:

== Film and television ==
- Denied, a 2004 film starring Matt Austin
- "Denied", a 2016 episode of The Story of Us

== Songs ==
- "Denied", from the 1994 Our Lady Peace album Naveed
- "Denied", from the 1996 Unwritten Law album Oz Factor
- "Denied", from the 1997 Edith Frost album Calling Over Time
- "Denied", from the 1997 Gang Green album Another Case of Brewtality
- "Denied", from the 2001 Annihilator album Carnival Diablos
- "Denied", from the 2004 Jackdaw album Triple Crown
- "Denied", from the 2005 Obituary album Frozen in Time
- "Denied", from the 2006 Robert Pollard album From a Compound Eye
- "Denied", from the 2007 Sonic Syndicate album Only Inhuman
- "Denied", from the 2010 Fiction Plan album Sparks
- "Denied", from the 2012 Arsis album Lepers Caress
- "Denied", from the 2012 Zebra & Giraffe album The Wisest Ones
- "Denied", from the 2013 Factor album Woke Up Alone

== See also ==
- Denial (disambiguation)
- Deny (disambiguation)
- Refusal (disambiguation)
