= Denial (disambiguation) =

A denial is an assertion that an allegation is not true.

Denial may also refer to:

== Film and television ==
- The Denial, a 1925 American silent drama film
- Denial (1990 film), an American drama by Erin Dignam
- Denial (1998 film), an American drama by Adam Rifkin
- Denial (2016 film), a British-American biographical drama directed by Mick Jackson
- "Denial" (Young Justice), a television episode
- "Denials" (The White Lotus), a television episode

== Literature ==
- Denial (novel), a 2005 novel by Stuart M. Kaminsky
- Denial (Tedlow book), a 2010 business book by Richard S. Tedlow
- "Denial" (poem), a 1931 poem by Giorgos Seferis
- Denial, a 2004 novel by David Belbin
- Denial, a 1998 novel by Peter James
- Denial, a 2011 novel by Coleen Nolan

== Music ==
- "Denial" (Sevendust song), 1999
- "Denial" (Sugababes song), 2008
- "Denial", a song by New Order from Movement, 1981
- "Denial", a song by James Marriott from Are We There Yet?, 2023

== Other uses ==
- Denial (Freud), a psychological defense mechanism
- Anti-access/area denial, a military strategy to control access to and within an operating environment
- Denial Ahmetović (born 1995), Bosnian pop singer
- Denial eSports, a defunct professional eSports organization

== See also ==
- Denialism, the rejection of propositions on which a scientific or scholarly consensus exists
- "In Denial", a 1999 song by Pet Shop Boys from Nightlife
- Deny (disambiguation)
- Denier (disambiguation)
- Refusal (disambiguation)
