= Bert Eggo =

Scottish footballer (1895–1977)

Personal information
- Full name: Rober Mollison Eggo
- Date of birth: 22 November 1895
- Place of birth: Brechin, Scotland
- Date of death: 1977 (aged 81–82)
- Positions: Right back; half back

Senior career*
Years	Team	Apps	(Gls)
–1919	Brechin North End		
1919	Heart of Midlothian	3	(0)
1919–1920	Dunfermline Athletic	0	(0)
1920–1922	The Wednesday	23	(0)
1922–1929	Reading	289	(2)
- * Club domestic league appearances and goals

Robert Mollison Eggo (22 November 1895 – 1977) was a Scottish professional footballer who made over 280 appearances in the Football League for Reading as a right back or half back. He also played for The Wednesday and Heart of Midlothian.

== Career statistics ==
Appearances and goals by club, season and competition
Club	Season	League			National Cup		Total	
Club	Season	Division	Apps	Goals	Apps	Goals	Apps	Goals
Heart of Midlothian	1918–19	Scottish First Division	1	0	―		1	0
Heart of Midlothian	1919–20	Scottish First Division	2	0	0	0	2	0
Heart of Midlothian	Total		3	0	0	0	3	0
The Wednesday	1919–20	First Division	4	0	0	0	4	0
The Wednesday	1920–21	Second Division	19	0	0	0	19	0
The Wednesday	Total		23	0	0	0	23	0
Career total			26	0	0	0	26	0

== Honours ==
Reading

- Football League Third Division South: 1925–26

Individual

- Reading Hall of Fame
