= Bertie Denyer =

English footballer

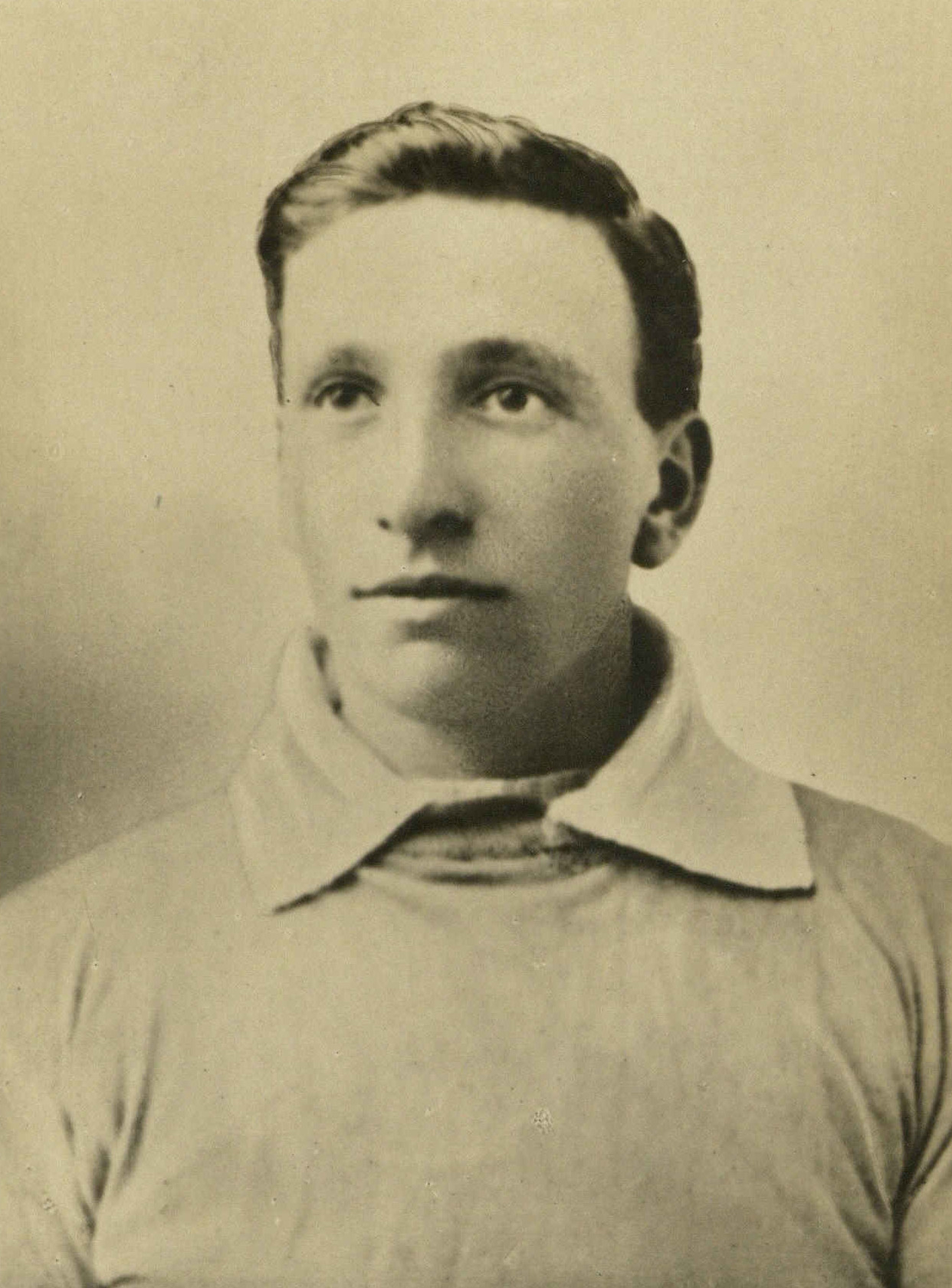
- Denyer while with Swindon Town in 1922.

Personal information
- Full name: Albert Edward Curly Denyer
- Date of birth: 9 April 1893
- Place of birth: Plaistow, England
- Date of death: 1969 (aged 75–76)
- Place of death: Swindon, England
- Positions: Outside right; centre forward

Senior career*
| Years | Team | Apps | (Gls) |
| 1911 | Ilford | | |
| 1911 | West Ham United | | |
| 1911 | Leyton | | |
| 1911–1914 | West Ham United | 46 | (17) |
| 1914–1931 | Swindon Town | 341 | (58) |
| 1915–1918 | → Brentford (guest) | 16 | (11) |
| 1917 | → Heart of Midlothian (guest) | 18 | (7) |
| 1931–1934 | Evesham Town | | |
- West End Sports

International career
| 1907 | England Schoolboys | 1 | (0) |
- * Club domestic league appearances and goals

Albert Edward Curly Denyer (9 April 1893 – 1969) was an English professional footballer who made over 320 appearances in the Football League for Swindon Town as a forward.

== Personal life ==
Denyer's brother Frank and son Bertie were also footballers. Denyer served as a sergeant in the Royal Fusiliers (City of London Regiment) during the First World War and was severely wounded, losing half of his intestines. After his retirement from football he became landlord of the Running Horse pub in Swindon.

== Career statistics ==
Appearances and goals by club, season and competition
| Club | Season | League | | | National cup (Note: Includes FA Cup, Scottish Cup) | | Other | | Total | |
| Club | Season | Division | Apps | Goals | Apps | Goals | Apps | Goals | Apps | Goals |
|---|---|---|---|---|---|---|---|---|---|---|
| West Ham United | 1912–13 | Southern League First Division | 29 | 12 | 4 | 1 | — | | 33 | 13 |
| West Ham United | 1913–14 | Southern League First Division | 17 | 5 | 0 | 0 | — | | 17 | 5 |
| West Ham United | Total | | 46 | 17 | 4 | 1 | — | | 50 | 18 |
| Swindon Town | 1914–15 | Southern League First Division | 17 | 9 | 2 | 1 | 2 (Note: Appearances in Southern Professional Charity Cup) | 1 | 21 | 11 |
| Swindon Town | 1920–21 | Third Division | 24 | 8 | 1 | 0 | — | | 25 | 8 |
| Swindon Town | 1921–22 | Third Division South | 20 | 6 | 0 | 0 | — | | 20 | 6 |
| Swindon Town | 1922–23 | Third Division South | 32 | 6 | 2 | 0 | — | | 34 | 6 |
| Swindon Town | 1923–24 | Third Division South | 37 | 3 | 5 | 2 | — | | 42 | 5 |
| Swindon Town | 1924–25 | Third Division South | 40 | 2 | 1 | 0 | — | | 41 | 2 |
| Swindon Town | 1925–26 | Third Division South | 39 | 6 | 4 | 3 | — | | 43 | 9 |
| Swindon Town | 1926–27 | Third Division South | 34 | 5 | 2 | 0 | — | | 36 | 5 |
| Swindon Town | 1927–28 | Third Division South | 39 | 5 | 5 | 0 | — | | 44 | 5 |
| Swindon Town | 1928–29 | Third Division South | 24 | 4 | 5 | 1 | — | | 29 | 5 |
| Swindon Town | 1929–30 | Third Division South | 35 | 4 | 3 | 0 | — | | 38 | 4 |
| Swindon Town | Total | | 341 | 58 | 30 | 7 | 2 | 1 | 373 | 66 |
| Heart of Midlothian (guest) | 1916–17 | Scottish League First Division | 13 | 6 | — | | 2 (Note: Appearances in Rosebery Charity Cup) | 3 | 15 | 9 |
| Heart of Midlothian (guest) | 1917–18 | Scottish League First Division | 5 | 1 | — | | 0 | 0 | 5 | 1 |
| Heart of Midlothian (guest) | Total | | 18 | 7 | — | | 2 | 3 | 20 | 10 |
| Career total | | | 402 | 82 | 34 | 8 | 4 | 4 | 440 | 94 |

== Honours ==
Heart of Midlothian

- Rosebery Charity Cup: 1916–17
