= 1924–25 Heart of Midlothian F.C. season =

Heart of Midlothian
1924–25 season
- Manager: Willie McCartney
- Stadium: Tynecastle Park
- Scottish First Division: 10th
- Scottish Cup: 2nd Round

During the 1924–25 season Hearts competed in the Scottish First Division, the Scottish Cup and the East of Scotland Shield.

== Fixtures ==
=== Scottish Cup ===
24 January 1925 Scottish Cup R1	Hearts	4–1	Leith Athletic	Tynecastle Park
				Attendance: 15,000

7 February 1925 Scottish Cup R2	Kilmarnock	2–1	Hearts	Rugby Park
				Attendance: 14,300

=== Scottish First Division ===
16 August 1924 Scottish First Division	Cowdenbeath	1–2	Hearts	Central Park
				Attendance: 17,810

20 August 1924 Scottish First Division	Hearts	3–3	Cowdenbeath	Tynecastle Park
				Attendance: 20,000

23 August 1924 Scottish First Division	Hearts	2–3	Ayr United	Tynecastle Park
				Attendance: 21,500

30 August 1924 Scottish First Division	Dundee	6–0	Hearts	Dens Park
				Attendance: 17,000

6 September 1924 Scottish First Division	Hearts	5–1	Morton	Tynecastle Park
				Attendance: 17,500

13 September 1924 Scottish First Division	Falkirk	2–1	Hearts	Brockville Park
				Attendance: 10,000

15 September 1924 Scottish First Division	Hearts	1–2	Rangers	Tynecastle Park
				Attendance: 21,500

20 September 1924 Scottish First Division	Hearts	2–0	Airdrieonians	Tynecastle Park
				Attendance: 23,500

27 September 1924 Scottish First Division	Hamilton Academical	0–2	Hearts	Douglas Park
				Attendance: 12,000

29 September 1924 Scottish First Division	Rangers	4–1	Hearts	Ibrox Park
				Attendance: 12,000

4 October 1924 Scottish First Division	Hearts	2–2	Motherwell	Tynecastle Park
				Attendance: 18,500

11 October 1924 Scottish First Division	Celtic	1–0	Hearts	Celtic Park
				Attendance: 10,000

18 October 1924 Scottish First Division	Hearts	2–0	Hibernian	Tynecastle Park
				Attendance: 33,500

25 October 1924 Scottish First Division	Partick Thistle	3–3	Hearts	Firhill Park
				Attendance: 8,000

1 November 1924 Scottish First Division	Raith Rovers	2–0	Hearts	Stark's Park
				Attendance: 15,000

8 November 1924 Scottish First Division	Hearts	1–1	Aberdeen	Tynecastle Park
				Attendance: 17,500

15 November 1924 Scottish First Division	Hearts	2–3	Third Lanark	Tynecastle Park
				Attendance: 16,500

22 November 1924 Scottish First Division	Kilmarnock	2–1	Hearts	Rugby Park
				Attendance: 3,000

29 November 1924 Scottish First Division	Hearts	3–2	Falkirk	Tynecastle Park
				Attendance: 17,000

6 December 1924 Scottish First Division	Queen's Park	2–0	Hearts	Hampden Park
				Attendance: 12,000

13 December 1924 Scottish First Division	Hearts	3–1	Celtic	Tynecastle Park
				Attendance: 18,000

20 December 1924 Scottish First Division	Motherwell	0–0	Hearts	Fir Park
				Attendance: 3,000

27 December 1924 Scottish First Division	Hearts	1–1	St Mirren	Tynecastle Park
				Attendance: 14,000

1 January 1925 Scottish First Division	Hibernian	2–1	Hearts	Easter Road
				Attendance: 25,000

3 January 1925 Scottish First Division	Ayr United	2–1	Hearts	Somerset Park
				Attendance: 6,000

10 January 1925 Scottish First Division	Hearts	2–2	Raith Rovers	Tynecastle Park
				Attendance: 20,500

17 January 1925 Scottish First Division	St Mirren	4–3	Hearts	St Mirren Park, Love Street
				Attendance: 7,000

31 January 1925 Scottish First Division	Hearts	5–2	St Johnstone	Tynecastle Park
				Attendance: 16,000

11 February 1925 Scottish First Division	Hearts	2–1	Partick Thistle	Tynecastle Park
				Attendance: 8,000

14 February 1925 Scottish First Division	Morton	2–0	Hearts	Cappielow Park
				Attendance: 4,000

21 February 1925 Scottish First Division	Third Lanark	2–2	Hearts	Cathkin Park
				Attendance: 8,000

28 February 1925 Scottish First Division	Hearts	3–2	Hamilton Academical	Tynecastle Park
				Attendance: 14,000

7 March 1925 Scottish First Division	Airdrieonians	2–2	Hearts	Broomfield Park
				Attendance: 8,000

14 March 1925 Scottish First Division	Hearts	1–1	Kilmarnock	Tynecastle Park
				Attendance: 18,000

28 March 1925 Scottish First Division	Hearts	3–1	Queen's Park	Tynecastle Park
				Attendance: 17,000

4 April 1925 Scottish First Division	Aberdeen	0–0	Hearts	Pittodrie Park
				Attendance: 10,000

11 April 1925 Scottish First Division	St Johnstone	3–1	Hearts	Muirton Park
				Attendance: 10,000

18 April 1925 Scottish First Division	Hearts	1–0	Dundee	Tynecastle Park
				Attendance: 6,000

== See also ==
- List of Heart of Midlothian F.C. seasons

== Bibliography ==
- Statistical Record 24-25
