= 1933–34 Celtic F.C. season =

Celtic
1933–34 season
- Manager: Willie Maley
- Stadium: Celtic Park
- Scottish First Division: 3rd
- Scottish Cup: 4th Round

The 1933–34 Scottish football season was Celtic's 46th season of competitive football, in which they competed in the Scottish First Division and the Scottish Cup.

Celtic ended the league third, well behind runners-up Motherwell and champions Rangers.

They failed to retain their Scottish Cup title as they lost away 2-0 to eventual runners-up St. Mirren in the quarter-final round.

This was Jimmy McStay's last season as a Celtic player.

== Competitions ==
=== Scottish First Division ===
==== League table ====
Pos	Team	Pld	W	D	L	GF	GA	GD	Pts	Qualification or relegation
1	Rangers	38	30	6	2	118	41	+77	66	Champions
2	Motherwell	38	29	4	5	97	45	+52	62	
3	Celtic	38	18	11	9	78	53	+25	47	
4	Queen of the South	38	21	3	14	75	48	+27	45	
5	Aberdeen	38	18	8	12	90	57	+33	44	

Source: RSSSF

==== Matches ====
12 August 1933 Division A	Queen of the South	3–2	Celtic	Dumfries
				Stadium: Palmerston Park; Attendance: 10,948

19 August 1933 Division A	Celtic	2–2	Falkirk	Glasgow
				Stadium: Celtic Park; Attendance: 7,000

23 August 1933 Division A	Partick Thistle	0–3	Celtic	Glasgow
				Stadium: Firhill Park; Attendance: 15,000

26 August 1933 Division A	Kilmarnock	4–3	Celtic	Kilmarnock
				Stadium: Rugby Park; Attendance: 14,000

2 September 1933 Division A	Celtic	0–0	Hearts	Glasgow
				Stadium: Celtic Park; Attendance: 20,000

9 September 1933 Division A	Rangers	2–2	Celtic	Glasgow
				Stadium: Ibrox Park; Attendance: 49,000

19 September 1933 Division A	Celtic	7–0	Cowdenbeath	Glasgow
				Stadium: Celtic Park; Attendance: 7,000

23 September 1933 Division A	St Johnstone	1–1	Celtic	Perth
				Stadium: Muirton Park; Attendance: 9,000

30 September 1933 Division A	Celtic	3–1	Queen's Park	Glasgow
				Stadium: Celtic Park; Attendance: 15,000

7 October 1933 Division A	Aberdeen	3–0	Celtic	Aberdeen
				Stadium: Pittodrie Park; Attendance: 17,000

21 October 1933 Division A	Motherwell	1–1	Celtic	Motherwell
				Stadium: Fir Park; Attendance: 18,000

28 October 1933 Division A	Celtic	2–1	Hibernian	Glasgow
				Stadium: Celtic Park; Attendance: 15,000

4 November 1933 Division A	Celtic	2–0	Partick Thistle	Glasgow
				Stadium: Celtic Park; Attendance: 10,000

11 November 1933 Division A	Cowdenbeath	0–1	Celtic	Cowdenbeath
				Stadium: Central Park; Attendance: 3,000

18 November 1933 Division A	Ayr United	3–1	Celtic	Ayr
				Stadium: Somerset Park; Attendance: 11,000

25 November 1934 Division A	Celtic	3–1	Third Lanark	Glasgow
				Stadium: Celtic Park; Attendance: 8,000

2 December 1933 Division A	Celtic	4–2	Airdrieonians	Glasgow
				Stadium: Celtic Park; Attendance: 7,000

9 December 1933 Division A	Dundee	3–2	Celtic	Dundee
				Stadium: Dens Park; Attendance: 12,000

23 December 1933 Division A	Celtic	0–1	Queen of the South	Glasgow
				Stadium: Celtic Park; Attendance: 4,000

25 December 1933 Division A	Queen's Park	2–3	Celtic	Glasgow
				Stadium: Hampden Park; Attendance: 12,000

30 December 1933 Division A	Falkirk	2–0	Celtic	Falkirk
				Stadium: Brockville Park; Attendance: 8,000

1 January 1934 Division A	Celtic	2–2	Rangers	Glasgow
				Stadium: Celtic Park; Attendance: 45,000

6 January 1933 Division A	Celtic	4–1	Kilmarnock	Glasgow
				Stadium: Celtic Park; Attendance: 4,000

13 January 1934 Division A	Heart of Midlothian	2–1	Celtic	Edinburgh
				Stadium: Tynecastle Park; Attendance: 25,422

27 January 1934 Division A	Celtic	0–0	St Johnstone	Glasgow
				Stadium: Celtic Park; Attendance: 4,000

24 February 1934 Division A	Celtic	2–2	Aberdeen	Glasgow
				Stadium: Celtic Park; Attendance: 5,000

10 March 1934 Division A	Celtic	3–0	Motherwell	Glasgow
				Stadium: Celtic Park; Attendance: 15,000

17 March 1934 Division A	Hibernian	1–2	Celtic	Edinburgh
				Stadium: Easter Road; Attendance: 12,000

24 March 1934 Division A	Celtic	0–3	Ayr United	Glasgow
				Stadium: Celtic Park; Attendance: 5,000

31 March 1934 Division A	Third Lanark	1–1	Celtic	Glasgow
				Stadium: Cathkin Park; Attendance: 3,000

2 April 1934 Division A	Celtic	2–1	Clyde	Glasgow
				Stadium: Celtic Park; Attendance: 6,000

7 April 1934 Division A	Airdrieonians	2–4	Celtic	Airdrie
				Stadium: Broomfield Park; Attendance: 2,000

11 April 1934 Division A	Celtic	3–0	St Mirren	Glasgow
				Stadium: Celtic Park; Attendance: 3,000

14 April 1934 Division A	Hamilton Academical	1–1	Celtic	Hamilton
				Stadium: Douglas Park; Attendance: 6,000

18 April 1934 Division A	Clyde	1–1	Celtic	Glasgow
				Stadium: Shawfield Stadium; Attendance: 3,000

21 April 1934 Division A	Celtic	3–2	Dundee	Glasgow
				Stadium: Celtic Park; Attendance: 1,000

23 April 1934 Division A	Celtic	5–1	Hamilton Academical	Glasgow
				Stadium: Celtic Park; Attendance: 1,000

28 April 1934 Division A	St Mirren	1–2	Celtic	Paisley
				Stadium: St Mirren Park, Love Street; Attendance: 4,000

=== Scottish Cup ===
20 January 1934 First round	Dalbeattie Star	0–6	Celtic	Dalbeattie
				Stadium: Colliston Park; Attendance: 2,376

3 February 1934 Second round	Ayr United	2–3	Celtic	Ayr
				Stadium: Somerset Park; Attendance: 23,651

17 February 1934 Third round	Celtic	3–1	Falkirk	Glasgow
				Stadium: Celtic Park; Attendance: 43,000

3 March 1934 Fourth round	St Mirren	2–0	Celtic	Paisley
				Stadium: St Mirren Park, Love Street
