= Denyer =

Denyer is a surname. Notable people with the surname include:

- Bertie Denyer (1893–1969), English footballer
- Bertie Denyer (footballer, born 1924) (1924–2015), English footballer
- Carla Denyer (born 1985), English Green Party politician
- Frank Denyer (born 1943), English composer
- Grant Denyer (born 1977), Australian TV presenter and motor racing driver
- Paul Denyer (born 1972), Australian serial killer
- Peter Denyer (1947–2009), English actor
- Peter Denyer (footballer) (born 1957), English footballer
- Peter B. Denyer (1953–2010), British engineer, scientist and inventor
- Terence Denyer (born 1981), Zimbabwean cricketer
