= Deny =

Deny most commonly refers to:

- Denial, in ordinary English usage, an assertion that a statement or allegation is not true

Deny may also refer to:

== Music ==
- Deny (band), an Argentine post-hardcore band
- Deny (album), a 1992 album by the Ex Pistols
- "Deny", a 2001 song by Default
- "Deny", a song by the Clash from the album The Clash, 1977

== People ==
- Jacques Deny (1916–2016), French mathematician
- Pierre Deny (1956–2026), French actor
- Deny King (1909–1991), Australian naturalist
- Deny Marcel (born 1983), Indonesian footballer

== See also ==
- Denys
- Denyer
- Denial (disambiguation)
- Denier (disambiguation)
- Refusal (disambiguation)
