= 1922–23 Heart of Midlothian F.C. season =

Heart of Midlothian
1922–23 season
- Manager: Willie McCartney
- Stadium: Tynecastle Park
- Scottish First Division: 12th
- Scottish Cup: 2nd Round

During the 1922–23 season Hearts competed in the Scottish First Division, the Scottish Cup and the East of Scotland Shield.

== Fixtures ==
=== Scottish Cup ===
13 January 1923 Scottish Cup R1	Hearts	6–0	Thornhill	Tynecastle Park
				Attendance: 16,000

27 January 1923 Scottish Cup R2	Bo'ness	3–2	Hearts	Newton Park
				Attendance: 8,000

=== Scottish First Division ===
19 August 1922 Scottish First Division	Clyde	1–1	Hearts	Shawfield Stadium
				Attendance: 14,000

26 August 1922 Scottish First Division	Hearts	2–1	Dundee	Tynecastle Park
				Attendance: 28,500

2 September 1922 Scottish First Division	Hamilton Academical	3–1	Hearts	Douglas Park
				Attendance: 6,000

9 September 1922 Scottish First Division	Hearts	1–1	Albion Rovers	Tynecastle Park
				Attendance: 20,500

16 September 1922 Scottish First Division	Ayr United	1–1	Hearts	Somerset Park
				Attendance: 3,000

18 September 1922 Scottish First Division	Hearts	0–0	Rangers	Tynecastle Park
				Attendance: 24,000

23 September 1922 Scottish First Division	Hearts	2–2	Hibernian	Tynecastle Park
				Attendance: 31,500

30 September 1922 Scottish First Division	Alloa Athletic	0–3	Hearts	Recreation Park
				Attendance: 6,500

7 October 1922 Scottish First Division	Hearts	0–0	Raith Rovers	Tynecastle Park
				Attendance: 25,000

14 October 1922 Scottish First Division	Partick Thistle	2–2	Hearts	Firhill Park
				Attendance: 10,000

21 October 1922 Scottish First Division	Kilmarnock	1–2	Hearts	Rugby Park
				Attendance: 5,000

28 October 1922 Scottish First Division	Hearts	1–1	Falkirk	Tynecastle Park
				Attendance: 24,000

4 November 1922 Scottish First Division	Hearts	2–2	St Mirren	Tynecastle Park
				Attendance: 18,000

11 November 1922 Scottish First Division	Aberdeen	0–1	Hearts	Pittodrie Park
				Attendance: 15,000

18 November 1922 Scottish First Division	Hearts	3–1	St Mirren	Tynecastle Park
				Attendance: 19,000

25 November 1922 Scottish First Division	Airdrieonians	2–2	Hearts	Broomfield Park
				Attendance: 9,000

2 December 1922 Scottish First Division	Hearts	3–0	Partick Thistle	Tynecastle Park
				Attendance: 20,000

9 December 1922 Scottish First Division	Motherwell	4–1	Hearts	Fir Park
				Attendance: 7,000

16 December 1922 Scottish First Division	Hearts	0–3	Celtic	Tynecastle Park
				Attendance: 32,500

23 December 1922 Scottish First Division	Albion Rovers	1–2	Hearts	Cliftonhill
				Attendance: 5,000

30 December 1922 Scottish First Division	Hearts	1–2	Hamilton Academical	Tynecastle Park
				Attendance: 9,500

1 January 1923 Scottish First Division	Hibernian	2–1	Hearts	Easter Road
				Attendance: 25,000

2 January 1923 Scottish First Division	St Mirren	2–1	Hearts	St Mirren Park, Love Street
				Attendance: 12,000

6 January 1923 Scottish First Division	Hearts	2–0	Third Lanark	Tynecastle Park
				Attendance: 14,000

20 January 1923 Scottish First Division	Dundee	0–0	Hearts	Dens Park
				Attendance: 12,000

3 February 1923 Scottish First Division	Raith Rovers	2–1	Hearts	Stark's Park
				Attendance: 10,000

7 February 1923 Scottish First Division	Hearts	2–1	Clyde	Tynecastle Park
				Attendance: 3,500

10 February 1923 Scottish First Division	Hearts	5–0	Kilmarnock	Tynecastle Park
				Attendance: 7,500

17 February 1923 Scottish First Division	Third Lanark	3–1	Hearts	Cathkin Park
				Attendance: 12,000

24 February 1923 Scottish First Division	Hearts	1–1	Airdrieonians	Tynecastle Park
				Attendance: 10,000

3 March 1923 Scottish First Division	Falkirk	1–0	Hearts	Brockville Park
				Attendance: 8,000

14 March 1923 Scottish First Division	Hearts	1–2	Motherwell	Tynecastle Park
				Attendance: 6,500

17 March 1923 Scottish First Division	Morton	0–1	Hearts	Cappielow Park
				Attendance: 8,000

24 March 1923 Scottish First Division	Hearts	1–1	Alloa Athletic	Tynecastle Park
				Attendance: 12,500

31 March 1923 Scottish First Division	Hearts	0–0	Aberdeen	Tynecastle Park
				Attendance: 11,000

7 April 1923 Scottish First Division	Celtic	2–1	Hearts	Celtic Park
				Attendance: 11,000

21 April 1923 Scottish First Division	Hearts	1–1	Ayr United	Tynecastle Park
				Attendance: 7,500

28 April 1923 Scottish First Division	Rangers	3–0	Hearts	Ibrox Park
				Attendance: 8,000

== See also ==
- List of Heart of Midlothian F.C. seasons
