= Richard S. Tedlow =

- Born: September 12, 1947 (age 78)
- Education: B.A. Yale, 1969; M.A. Columbia, 1971; PhD Columbia, 1976
- Alma mater: Yale University; Columbia University
- Occupations: Academic, author, consultant
- Employer: Harvard Business School

Richard S. Tedlow is the MBA Class of 1949 Professor of Business Administration at Harvard Business School, where he is a specialist in the history of business.

== Education and career ==
Tedlow received a Bachelor of Arts from Yale in 1969, and a Master of Arts from Columbia University in 1971 and a PhD, also from Columbia in 1976. He joined the Harvard Business School on a fellowship in 1978, and joined the Faculty in 1979. At Harvard, he has taught marketing and has been a member of the faculty of the "Strategic Retail Management Seminar," the "Top Management Seminar for Retailers and Suppliers," "Managing Brand Meaning," and the "Strategic Marketing Management" executive education programs. He has also taught in numerous executive programs at the Harvard Business School as well as at corporations, including programs in marketing strategy and general management.

== Recognition ==
Tedlow's book, Giants of Enterprise: Seven Business Innovators and the Empires They Built was selected by Business Week as one of the top ten business books of 2001 and in 2006, Business Week selected his book, Andy Grove: The Life and Times of an American as one of the top ten business books for that year.

== Bibliography ==
- Keeping the Corporate Image: Public Relations and Business, 1900-1950 (1979)
- New and Improved: The Story of Mass Marketing in America (1990)
- Giants of Enterprise (2001)
- The Watson Dynasty: The Fiery Reign and Troubled Legacy of IBM's Founding Father and Son (2003)
- Andy Grove: The Life and Times of an American (2007)
- Denial: Why Business Leaders Fail to Look Facts in the Face---And What to Do about It (2010)
