= Giorgos Seferis =

Greek poet and diplomat (1900–1971)

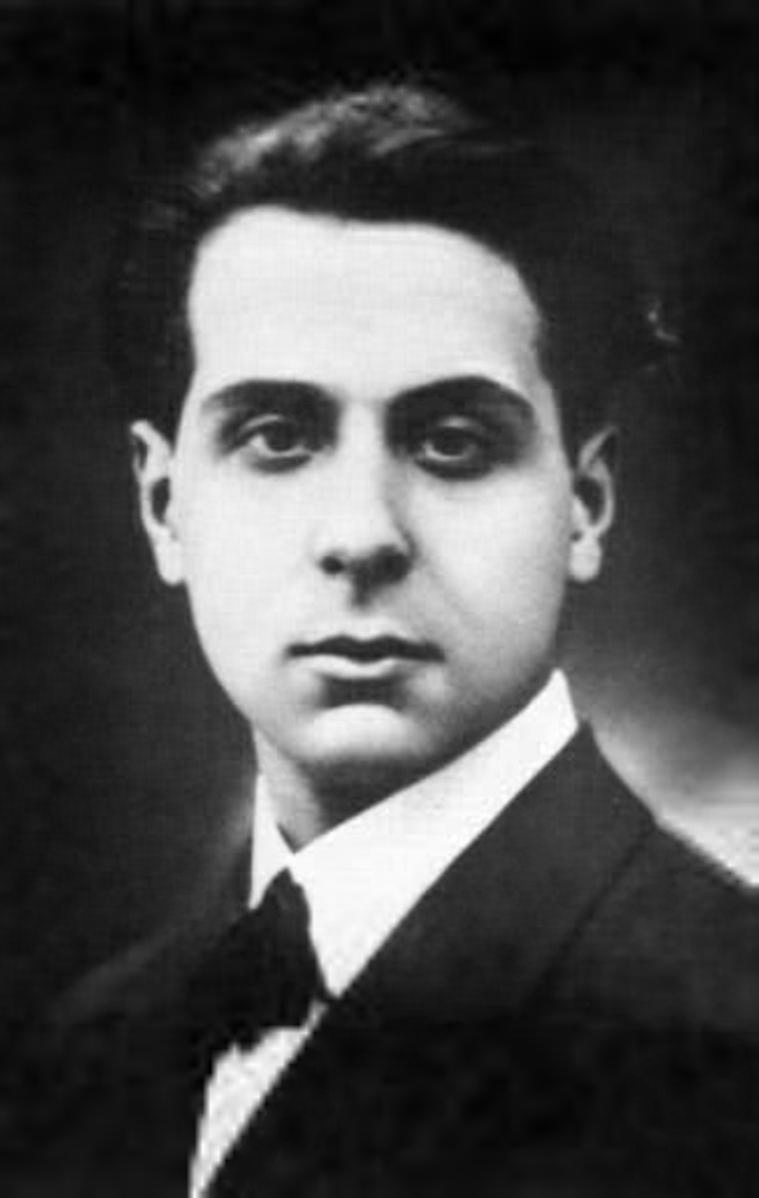
- Seferis in 1921
- Born: Georgios Seferiadis; February 28, 1900; Urla, Aidin Vilayet, Ottoman Empire
- Died: September 20, 1971 (aged 71); Athens, Greece
- Education: University of Paris
- Occupations: Poet, diplomat
- Spouse: Maria Zannou
- Writing career
- Notable awards: Nobel Prize in Literature; 1963
- Movements: Modernism, Generation of the '30s

Giorgos or George Seferis (/səˈfɛrɪs/; Greek: Γιώργος Σεφέρης [ˈʝorɣos seˈferis]), the pen name of Georgios Seferiadis (Γεώργιος Σεφεριάδης; March 13 [O.S. February 28] 1900 – September 20, 1971), was a Greek poet and diplomat. He was one of the most important Greek poets of the 20th century, and a Nobel laureate.

He was a career diplomat in the Greek Foreign Service, culminating in his appointment as Ambassador to the UK, a post which he held from 1957 to 1962.

== Biography ==
Seferis was born in Smyrna in Asia Minor, in the Aidin Vilayet of the Ottoman Empire (now İzmir, Turkey). His father, Stelios Seferiadis, was a lawyer, and later a professor at the University of Athens, as well as a poet and translator in his own right. He was also a staunch Venizelist and a supporter of the demotic Greek language over the formal, official language (katharevousa). Both of these attitudes influenced his son. In 1914, the family moved to Athens, where Seferis completed his secondary school education. He continued his studies in Paris from 1918 to 1925, studying law at the Sorbonne. While he was there, in September 1922, Smyrna/Izmir was taken by the Turkish Army after a two-year Greek military campaign on Anatolian soil. Many Greeks, including Seferis's family, fled from Anatolia. Seferis would not visit Smyrna again until 1950; the sense of being an exile from his childhood home would inform much of Seferis's poetry, showing itself particularly in his interest in the story of Odysseus. Seferis was also greatly influenced by Constantine P. Cavafy, T. S. Eliot and Ezra Pound.

He returned to Athens in 1925 and was admitted to the Greek Ministry of Foreign Affairs in the following year. This was the beginning of a long and successful diplomatic career, during which he held posts in the United Kingdom (1931–1934) and Albania (1936–1938). He married Maria Zannou ('Maro') on April 10, 1941, on the eve of the German invasion of Greece. During the Second World War, Seferis accompanied the Greek government-in-exile to Crete, Egypt, South Africa, and Italy, and returned to liberated Athens in 1944. He continued to serve in the Ministry of Foreign Affairs and held diplomatic posts in Ankara, Turkey (1948–1950) and London (1951–1953). He was appointed minister to Lebanon, Syria, Jordan, and Iraq (1953–1956), and was Ambassador to the United Kingdom from 1957 to 1961, the last post before his retirement in Athens. Seferis received many honours and prizes, among them honorary doctoral degrees from the universities of Cambridge (1960), Oxford (1964), Thessaloniki (1964), and Princeton (1965).

=== Cyprus ===
Seferis first visited Cyprus in November 1953. He immediately fell in love with the island, partly because of its resemblance, in its landscape, the mixture of populations, and in its traditions, to his childhood summer home in Skala (Urla). His book of poems Imerologio Katastromatos III was inspired by the island, and mostly written there, bringing to an end a period of six or seven years in which Seferis had not produced any poetry. Its original title Cyprus, where it was ordained for me... (a quotation from Euripides' Helen in which Teucer states that Apollo has decreed that Cyprus shall be his home) made clear the optimistic sense of homecoming Seferis felt on discovering the island. Seferis changed the title in the 1959 edition of his poems.

Politically, Cyprus was entangled in the dispute between the UK, Greece and Turkey over its international status. Over the next few years, Seferis made use of his position in the diplomatic service to strive towards a resolution of the Cyprus dispute, investing a great deal of personal effort and emotion. This was one of the few areas in his life in which he allowed the personal and the political to mix. Seferis described his political principles as "liberal and democratic [or republican]."

=== Nobel Prize ===
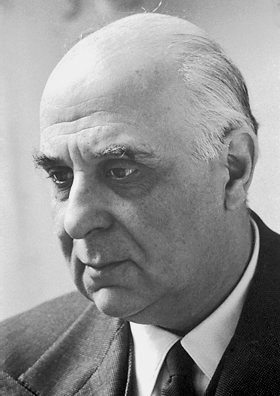
George Seferis in 1963

In 1963, Seferis was awarded the Nobel Prize for Literature "for his eminent lyrical writing, inspired by a deep feeling for the Hellenic world of culture." Seferis was nominated in total four times for the Nobel Prize. Romilly Jenkins nominated him in 1955, T.S. Eliot nominated him in 1961, Eyvind Johnson and C. A. Trypanis both nominated in 1962, and it was the 1963 nomination again by Eyvind Johnson that won him the prize. Seferis was the first Greek to receive the prize (followed by Odysseas Elytis, who became a Nobel laureate in 1979). But in his acceptance speech, Seferis chose rather to emphasise his own humanist philosophy, concluding: "When on his way to Thebes Oedipus encountered the Sphinx, his answer to its riddle was: 'Man'. That simple word destroyed the monster. We have many monsters to destroy. Let us think of the answer of Oedipus." While Seferis has sometimes been considered a nationalist poet, his 'Hellenism' had more to do with his identifying a unifying strand of humanism in the continuity of Greek culture and literature. The other five finalists for the prize that year were W. H. Auden, Pablo Neruda (1971 winner), Samuel Beckett (1969 winner), Yukio Mishima and Aksel Sandemose.

=== Later life ===
In 1967, the repressive nationalist, right-wing Regime of the Colonels took power in Greece after a coup d'état. After two years marked by widespread censorship, political detentions and torture, Seferis took a stand against the regime. On March 28, 1969, he made a statement on the BBC World Service, with copies simultaneously distributed to every newspaper in Athens. In authoritative and absolute terms, he stated "This anomaly must end".

Seferis did not live to see the end of the junta in 1974 as a direct result of the Turkish invasion of Cyprus, which had itself been prompted by the junta's attempt to overthrow Cyprus's president, Archbishop Makarios III. He died in Athens on September 20, 1971. The cause of death was reported to be pneumonia, aggravated by a stroke he had suffered after undergoing surgery for a bleeding ulcer about two months earlier.

At his funeral, huge crowds followed his coffin through the streets of Athens, singing Mikis Theodorakis' setting of Seferis's poem 'Denial' (then banned); he had become a popular hero for his resistance to the regime. He is buried at the First Cemetery of Athens.

== Legacy ==
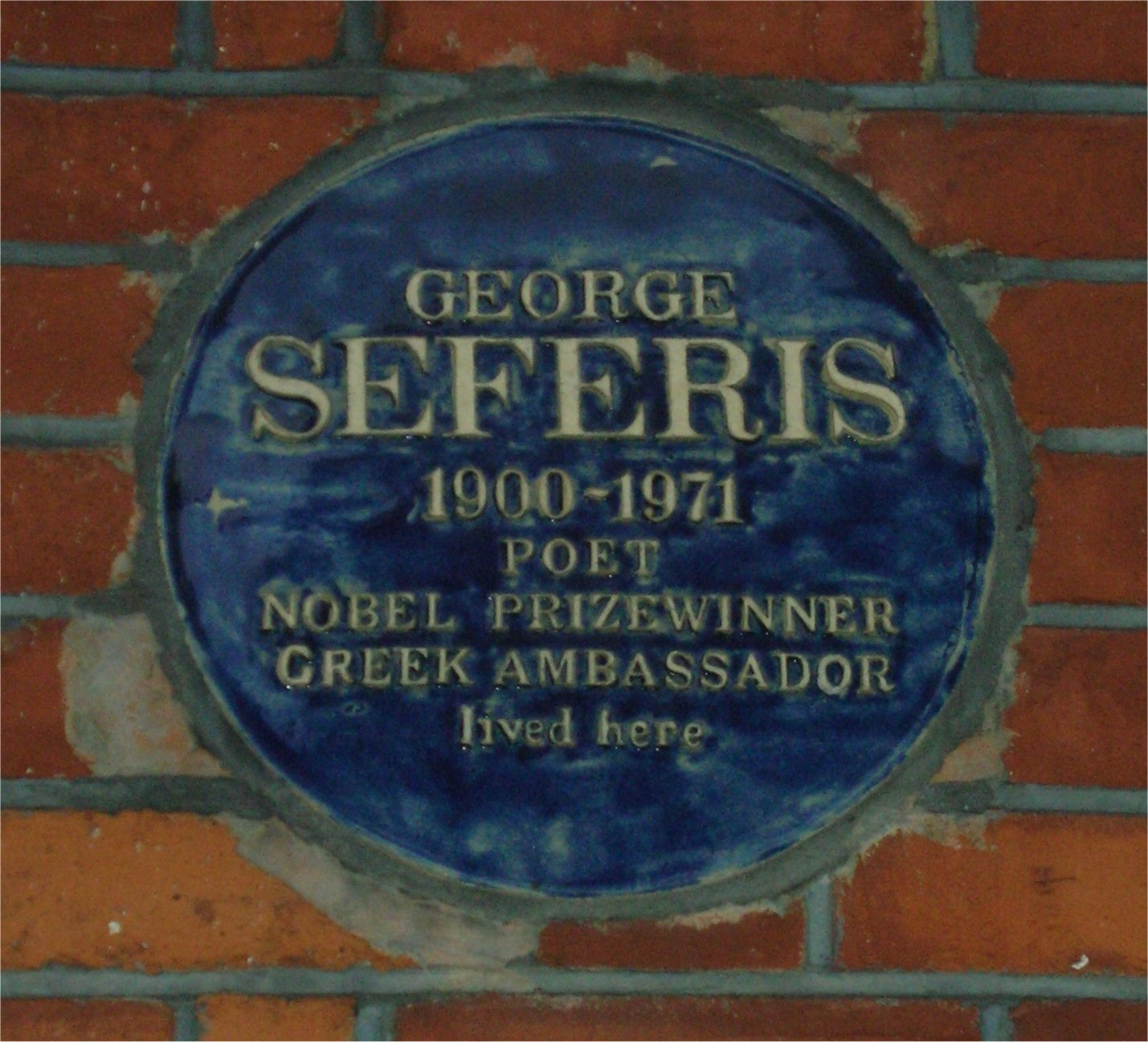
Blue plaque at 7 Sloane Avenue, London

His house at Pangrati district of central Athens, just next to the Panathinaiko Stadium of Athens, still stands today at Agras Street.

There are commemorative blue plaques on two of his London homes – 51 Upper Brook Street (residence of the Greek Ambassador), and at 7 Sloane Avenue.

In 1999, there was a dispute over the naming of a street in İzmir Yorgos Seferis Sokagi due to continuing ill-feeling over the Greco-Turkish War in the early 1920s.

In 2004, the band Sigmatropic released "16 Haiku & Other Stories," an album dedicated to and lyrically derived from Seferis's work. Vocalists included recording artists Laetitia Sadier, Alejandro Escovedo, Cat Power, and Robert Wyatt. Seferis's famous stanza from Mythistorema was featured in the Opening Ceremony of the 2004 Athens Olympic Games:

I woke with this marble head in my hands;
It exhausts my elbows and I don't know where to put it down.
It was falling into the dream as I was coming out of the dream.
So our life became one and it will be very difficult for it to separate again.

Stephen King quotes several of Seferis's poems as epigraphs in his 1975 novel 'Salem's Lot.

The composer Richard Causton wrote a piece for solo flute, Sleep, which is inspired by Mythistorema.

== Works ==
=== Poetry ===
- Strophe, 1931 (Στροφή)
- The Cistern, 1932 (Στέρνα)
- Mythical narrative, 1935 (Μυθιστόρημα)
- Book of Exercises, 1940 (Τετράδιο Γυμνασμάτων)
- Log Book I, 1940 (Ημερολόγιο Καταστρώματος Ι)
- Log Book II, 1944 (Ημερολόγιο Καταστρώματος ΙΙ)
- The Thrush, 1947 (Κίχλη)
- Log Book III, 1955 (Ημερολόγιο Καταστρώματος ΙΙΙ)
- Three Secret Poems, 1966 (Τρία Κρυφά Ποιήματα)
- Book of Exercises ΙΙ, 1976 (Τετράδιο Γυμνασμάτων II)

=== Prose ===
- Essays (Δοκιμές) 3 vols. (vols 1–2, 3rd ed. (ed. G.P. Savidis) 1974, vol 3 (ed. Dimitri Daskalopoulos) 1992)
- Translations (Αντιγραφές) (1965)
- Days–diaries (Μέρες) (9 vols., published posthumously, 1975–2019)
- Six Nights on the Acropolis (Έξι νύχτες στην Ακρόπολη) (published posthumously, 1974)
- Varnavas Kalostefanos (Βαρνάβας Καλοστέφανος) (published posthumously, 2007)

=== English translations ===
- George Seferis's 'On a Winter Ray' Cordite Poetry Review [Greek and English texts]
- Three Secret Poems, trans. Walter Kaiser (1969). Cambridge, MA: Harvard University Press [Greek and English texts]
- Complete Poems trans. Edmund Keeley and Philip Sherrard. (1995) London: Anvil Press Poetry. ISBN [English only]
- Collected Poems, trans. E. Keeley, P. Sherrard (1981) [Greek and English texts]
- A Poet's Journal: Days of 1945–1951 trans. Athan Anagnostopoulos. (1975) London: Harvard University Press. ISBN
- On the Greek Style: Selected Essays on Poetry and Hellenism trans. Rex Warner and Th.D. Frangopoulos. (1966) London: Bodley Head, reprinted (1982, 1992, 2000) Limni (Greece): Denise Harvey (Publisher), ISBN 960-7120-03-5
- Poems trans. Rex Warner. (1960) London: Bodley Head; Boston and Toronto: Little, Brown and Company.
- Collected Poems trans. Manolis (Emmanuel Aligizakis). (2012) Surrey: Libros Libertad. ISBN 978-1926763-23-1
- Six Nights on the Acropolis, trans. by Susan Matthias (2007).

=== Correspondence ===
- This Dialectic of Blood and Light, George Seferis – Philip Sherrard, An Exchange: 1946–1971, 2015 Limni (Greece): Denise Harvey (Publisher) ISBN 978-960-7120-37-3
