= Stuart M. Kaminsky =

American novelist

- Born: September 29, 1934; Chicago, Illinois, U.S.
- Died: October 9, 2009 (aged 75); St. Louis, Missouri, U.S.
- Education: University of Illinois Urbana-Champaign (BS, MA); Northwestern University (PhD)
- Occupations: Mystery writer, novelist
- Spouse: Enid Perll

Stuart M. Kaminsky (September 29, 1934 – October 9, 2009) was an American mystery writer and film professor. He is known for three long-running series of mystery novels featuring the protagonists Toby Peters, a private detective in 1940s Hollywood (1977–2004); Inspector Porfiry Petrovich Rostnikov, a Moscow police inspector (1981–2010); and veteran Chicago police officer Abe Lieberman (1990–2007). There is also a fourth series featuring a Sarasota, Florida, process server named Lew Fonesca (1999–2009).

Kaminsky's Inspector Rostnikov novel A Cold Red Sunrise received the 1989 Edgar Award for Best Novel. He earned six other Edgar nominations, most recently for the 2005 non-fiction book Behind the Mystery: Top Mystery Writers Interviewed, which was also nominated for an Anthony Award, a Macavity Award, and an Agatha Award. In 2006, Kaminsky received the Grand Master Award from the Mystery Writers of America. Kaminsky wrote sixty-three novels and eleven non-fiction books in addition to various other works such as short story collections, graphic novels, screenplays, television scripts and theatrical plays.

== Life and career ==
Kaminsky, who grew up in Chicago, earned a B.S. in journalism and an M.A. in English from the University of Illinois and a Ph.D. in speech from Northwestern University. He taught film studies at Northwestern for 16 years, and then taught at Florida State for six years.

Kaminsky's first novel was the 1977 Toby Peters mystery Bullet for a Star—creating the protagonist's name from a blend of his sons' names: Toby and Peter. He went on to write over sixty novels, as well as story collections and nonfiction works. Kaminsky was a past president of the Mystery Writers of America.

Besides being one of America's most prolific mystery writers, Kaminsky inspired many other writers in the genre, including fellow Chicagoan Sara Paretsky, who dedicated the first novel in her V. I. Warshawski private-eye series to Kaminsky.

== Death ==
Kaminsky and his wife, Enid Perll, moved to St. Louis, Missouri in March 2009 to await a liver transplant to treat the hepatitis he contracted as an army medic in the late 1950s in France. He suffered a stroke two days after their arrival in St. Louis, which made him ineligible for a transplant. He died on October 9, 2009.

== Works ==
=== Novels ===
==== Toby Peters series ====
1. Bullet for a Star (1977)
2. Murder on the Yellow Brick Road (1977)
3. You Bet Your Life (1978)
4. The Howard Hughes Affair (1979)
5. Never Cross a Vampire (1980)
6. High Midnight (1981)
7. Catch a Falling Clown (1981)
8. He Done Her Wrong (1983)
9. The Fala Factor (1984)
10. Down for the Count (1985)
11. The Man Who Shot Lewis Vance (1986)
12. Smart Moves (1986)
13. Think Fast, Mr. Peters (1987)
14. Buried Caesars (1989)
15. Poor Butterfly (1990)
16. The Melting Clock (1991)
17. The Devil Met a Lady (1993)
18. Tomorrow Is Another Day (1995)
19. Dancing in the Dark (1996)
20. A Fatal Glass of Beer (1997)
21. A Few Minutes Past Midnight (2001)
22. To Catch a Spy (2002)
23. Mildred Pierced (2003)
24. Now You See It (2004)

==== Inspector Rostnikov series ====
1. Rostnikov's Corpse (1981)
  (also published as Death of a Dissident)
2. Black Knight in Red Square (1983)
3. Red Chameleon (1985)
4. A Fine Red Rain (1987)
5. A Cold Red Sunrise (1988)
6. The Man Who Walked Like a Bear (1990)
7. Rostnikov's Vacation (1991)
8. Death of a Russian Priest (1992)
9. Hard Currency (1995)
10. Blood and Rubles (1996)
11. Tarnished Icons (1997)
12. The Dog Who Bit a Policeman (1998)
13. Fall of a Cosmonaut (2000)
14. Murder on the Trans-Siberian Express (2001)
15. People Who Walk in Darkness (2008)
16. A Whisper to the Living (2010)

==== Lew Fonesca series ====
1. Vengeance (1999)
2. Retribution (2001)
3. Midnight Pass (2003)
4. Denial (2005)
5. Always Say Goodbye (2006)
6. Bright Futures (2009)

==== Abe Lieberman series ====
1. Lieberman's Folly (1990)
2. Lieberman's Choice (1993)
3. Lieberman's Day (1994)
4. Lieberman's Thief (1995)
5. Lieberman's Law (1996)
6. The Big Silence (2000)
7. Not Quite Kosher (2002)
8. The Last Dark Place (2004)
9. Terror Town (2006)
10. The Dead Don't Lie (2007)

==== CSI: NY ====
1. Dead of Winter (2005)
2. Blood on the Sun (2006)
3. Deluge (2007)

==== Rockford Files novels ====
1. The Green Bottle (1996)
2. Devil on My Doorstep (1998)

==== Non-series ====
  - When the Dark Man Calls (1983)
  - Exercise in Terror (1985)

=== Story collections ===
- Hidden and Other Stories (1999)
- The Man Who Beat the System and Other Stories (Audio) (2000)

=== Other fiction ===
- Kolchak: The Night Stalker
  - Fever Pitch (graphic novel, with Christopher Jones and Barbara Schulz) (2003)
  - Kolchak the Night Stalker, Volume 1 (graphic novel, with Joe Gentile and Jeff Rice) (2004)
  - Kolchak: The Night Stalker Chronicles (story anthology, includes "The Night Talker" by Kaminsky) (2005)

=== As editor ===
- Opening Shots (1991)
- Mystery in the Sunshine State (1999)
- Show Business Is Murder (2004)
- On a Raven's Wing: New Tales in Honor of Edgar Allan Poe (2009)

=== Non-fiction ===
- A Biographical Study of the Career of Donald Siegel and an Analysis of His Films (1972)
- Clint Eastwood (1974)
- American Film Genres: Approaches to a Critical Theory of Popular Film (1974)
- Don Siegel, Director (1974)
- Ingmar Bergman: Essays in Criticism (1975)
- John Huston: Maker of Magic (1978)
- Coop: The Life and Legend of Gary Cooper (1979)
- Basic Filmmaking (with Dana H Hodgdon) (1981)
- Writing for Television (with Mark Walker) (1988)
- American Television Genres (1991)
- Behind the Mystery: Top Mystery Writers Interviewed (Interviews by Kaminsky; photographs by Laurie Roberts) (2005)

=== Filmography ===
- Once Upon a Time in America (1984)
- Enemy Territory (1987)
- Fréquence meurtre (1988)
- Woman in the Wind (1990)
- Hidden Fears (1993)
- A Nero Wolfe Mystery — "Immune to Murder" (2002)

=== Plays ===
- The Final Toast (2008)
- Books (2009)
