= Denial (novel) =

2005 mystery novel by Stuart M. Kaminsky

- First edition (publ. Forge Books)
- Author: Stuart M. Kaminsky
- Publisher: Forge Books
- Publication date: June 1, 2005
- ISBN: 978-0-765-31165-8

Denial is a 2005 mystery novel by American writer Stuart M. Kaminsky, a Grandmaster of the Mystery Writers of America. It is a Lew Fonesca mystery.

== Plot ==
This novel has two mysteries.

Lew, a process server and an occasional amateur detective, is investigating two separate cases. The first involves a nursing home resident who asks him to prove that a murder has occurred in the facility because no one will believe her. He searches for a hit-and-run driver who killed a 14 year old boy in the second. This investigation reignites the anguish he feels over losing his wife the same way and it sends him into despair.

== Main characters ==
- Lewis Fonesca - amateur sleuth
- Ann Horowitz - psychologist and friend of Lew
- Nancy Root - mother of Kyle McClory
- Kyle McClory - victim of the hit-and-run driver, John Welles
- John Wellington Welles - hit-and -run driver who ran over Kyle
- Dorothy Cgnozic - old woman who says she saw someone murdered in the Seaside Assisted Living
- Vivian Pastor - the one who was murdered by her daughter-in-law, Alberta Pastor
- Alberta Pastor - murderer of Vivian Pastor
- Georgia Cubbins - mother of Alberta who will confess what her daughter did to Vivian
- Ames McKinney - older friend and guardian of Lewis who helped him in his expedition
