= 1924–25 Scottish Division One =

26th season of top-tier football league in Scotland

Scottish Division One
- Season: 1924–25
- Champions: Rangers
- Relegated: Ayr United; Third Lanark

The 1924–25 Scottish Division One season was won by Rangers by three points over nearest rival Airdrieonians. Ayr United and Third Lanark finished 19th and 20th respectively and were relegated to the 1925–26 Scottish Division Two.

== League table ==
Pos	Team	Pld	W	D	L	GF	GA	GD	Pts
1	Rangers	38	25	10	3	76	26	+50	60
2	Airdrieonians	38	25	7	6	85	31	+54	57
3	Hibernian	38	22	8	8	78	43	+35	52
4	Celtic	38	18	8	12	77	44	+33	44
5	Cowdenbeath	38	16	10	12	76	65	+11	42
6	St Mirren	38	18	5	15	66	63	+3	41
7	Partick Thistle	38	14	10	14	60	61	−1	38
8	Dundee	38	14	8	16	47	54	−7	36
9	Raith Rovers	38	14	8	16	53	61	−8	36
10	Heart of Midlothian	38	12	11	15	64	68	−4	35
11	St Johnstone	38	12	11	15	57	72	−15	35
12	Kilmarnock	38	12	9	17	53	64	−11	33
13	Hamilton Academical	38	15	3	20	50	63	−13	33
14	Morton	38	12	9	17	46	69	−23	33
15	Aberdeen	38	11	10	17	46	56	−10	32
16	Falkirk	38	12	8	18	44	54	−10	32
17	Queen's Park	38	11	9	18	50	72	−22	31
18	Motherwell	38	10	10	18	54	63	−9	30
19	Ayr United	38	11	8	19	43	65	−22	30
20	Third Lanark	38	11	8	19	53	84	−31	30

== Results ==
Home \ Away	ABE	AIR	AYR	CEL	COW	DND	FAL	HAM	HOM	HIB	KIL	MOR	MOT	PAR	QPA	RAI	RAN	STJ	STM	THI
Aberdeen		1–2	0–1	0–4	3–0	0–0	1–1	2–0	0–0	0–1	0–0	0–1	2–0	2–0	3–1	2–3	0–1	2–1	2–3	3–1
Airdrieonians	0–0		3–0	3–1	2–0	1–1	1–1	2–0	2–2	2–0	4–2	6–2	5–0	4–1	3–0	1–0	1–0	6–0	2–0	3–0
Ayr United	3–3	0–1		1–2	1–2	1–0	0–0	3–1	2–1	2–2	0–1	4–0	1–0	0–1	1–1	3–2	0–4	5–3	1–1	0–0
Celtic	3–1	1–1	2–0		3–1	4–0	6–1	0–2	1–0	1–1	6–0	2–1	4–0	1–2	1–1	2–0	0–1	2–1	5–0	7–0
Cowdenbeath	2–1	2–1	4–0	3–0		2–0	1–0	3–1	1–2	1–1	5–2	5–0	4–0	3–0	4–0	1–1	2–2	1–2	5–4	3–4
Dundee	2–0	3–2	1–0	0–0	1–1		1–0	2–0	6–0	3–0	3–1	0–0	1–0	0–2	2–4	2–0	0–0	2–0	0–2	1–2
Falkirk	2–0	0–2	0–3	1–2	5–1	1–2		2–1	2–1	0–0	0–0	3–0	2–1	1–0	7–0	1–1	1–1	2–0	2–1	1–2
Hamilton Academical	2–1	1–2	1–0	0–4	5–1	4–1	1–2		0–2	0–2	2–1	1–0	1–1	1–1	3–1	1–0	1–0	3–2	1–3	1–2
Heart of Midlothian	1–1	2–0	2–3	3–1	3–3	1–1	3–2	3–2		2–0	1–1	5–1	2–2	2–1	3–1	2–2	1–2	1–1	5–2	2–3
Hibernian	4–1	1–1	7–0	2–3	4–1	4–2	1–2	2–1	2–1		2–0	2–0	1–0	3–2	2–0	3–0	4–1	5–0	2–0	5–1
Kilmarnock	0–1	2–3	4–1	2–1	0–0	4–1	1–0	1–3	2–1	0–1		3–1	0–2	1–1	3–1	3–0	0–0	4–0	3–2	2–2
Morton	1–1	0–1	3–1	1–0	1–3	1–1	2–0	2–0	2–0	2–2	2–2		0–0	1–6	4–0	2–3	1–1	1–1	2–1	1–0
Motherwell	1–2	1–5	1–1	1–0	0–3	4–1	4–1	3–3	0–0	1–1	2–1	3–0		1–3	4–1	2–1	1–1	4–1	1–2	8–0
Partick Thistle	1–4	2–1	2–0	2–2	6–1	1–1	2–0	3–0	3–3	3–1	2–1	2–2	2–2		3–1	0–0	0–1	0–1	1–3	0–3
Queen's Park	4–1	1–2	4–1	3–1	1–1	0–1	2–0	1–3	2–0	1–0	1–2	0–2	2–1	0–0		2–0	1–3	2–2	2–1	1–1
Raith Rovers	2–2	0–2	2–1	2–2	3–1	4–3	2–0	0–1	2–0	1–3	3–1	2–0	1–0	5–1	1–1		0–4	0–0	2–0	2–0
Rangers	2–0	1–1	1–0	4–1	1–0	2–0	3–1	2–0	4–1	3–0	1–1	2–0	1–0	4–0	1–1	3–0		3–1	3–1	5–2
St Johnstone	1–1	1–0	2–2	0–0	2–2	1–2	0–0	4–1	4–3	2–3	4–2	1–3	2–1	1–1	2–1	4–2	1–3		2–2	4–0
St Mirren	1–3	1–0	1–0	2–1	2–2	2–1	1–0	0–1	3–1	2–2	3–0	3–1	4–1	3–1	1–2	3–0	1–4	1–0		3–1
Third Lanark	4–0	1–7	0–1	1–1	1–1	3–0	4–0	2–1	2–2	1–2	2–0	2–3	1–1	1–2	1–3	2–4	1–1	0–2	0–1	

Legend: Blue = home team win; Yellow = draw; Red = away team win.
