= 1920–21 Heart of Midlothian F.C. season =

Heart of Midlothian
1920–21 season
- Manager: Willie McCartney
- Stadium: Tynecastle Park
- Scottish Football League: 3rd
- Scottish Cup: Semi-final

During the 1920–21 season Hearts competed in the Scottish Football League, the Scottish Cup and the East of Scotland Shield.

== Fixtures ==
=== Scottish Cup ===
5 February 1921 Scottish Cup R2	Hearts	0–0	Clyde	Tynecastle Park
				Attendance: 26,000

9 February 1921 Scottish Cup R2 Replay	Clyde	1–1	Hearts	Shawfield Stadium
				Attendance: 22,000

16 February 1921 Scottish Cup R2 2nd Replay	Clyde	2–3	Hearts	Shawfield Stadium
				Attendance: 20,000

19 February 1921 Scottish Cup R3	Hamilton Academical	0–1	Hearts	Douglas Park
				Attendance: 20,890

5 March 1921 Scottish Cup R4	Celtic	1–2	Hearts	Celtic Park
				Attendance: 37,000

26 March 1921 Scottish Cup SF	Hearts	0–0	Partick Thistle	Ibrox Park
				Attendance: 63,700

30 March 1921 Scottish Cup SF Replay	Hearts	0–0	Partick Thistle	Ibrox Park
				Attendance: 27,000

5 April 1921 Scottish Cup SF 2nd Replay	Hearts	0–2	Partick Thistle	Ibrox Park
				Attendance: 33,000

=== Scottish Football League ===
21 August 1920 Scottish First Division	Clyde	2–1	Hearts	Shawfield Stadium
				Attendance: 10,000

23 August 1920 Scottish First Division	Albion Rovers	1–1	Hearts	Cliftonhill
				Attendance: 5,000

28 August 1920 Scottish First Division	Hearts	5–1	Hibernian	Tynecastle Park
				Attendance: 27,500

4 September 1920 Scottish First Division	Morton	1–1	Hearts	Cappielow Park
				Attendance: 10,000

8 September 1920 Scottish First Division	Hearts	4–1	Ayr United	Tynecastle Park
				Attendance: 12,000

11 September 1920 Scottish First Division	Hearts	2–0	Clydebank	Tynecastle Park
				Attendance: 21,000

14 September 1920 Scottish First Division	Clydebank	1–2	Hearts	Clydeholm Park
				Attendance: 5,000

18 September 1920 Scottish First Division	Ayr United	0–0	Hearts	Somerset Park
				Attendance: 7,000

20 September 1920 Scottish First Division	Hearts	0–4	Rangers	Tynecastle Park
				Attendance: 34,000

25 September 1920 Scottish First Division	Hearts	2–0	Raith Rovers	Tynecastle Park
				Attendance: 20,000

2 October 1920 Scottish First Division	Hamilton Academical	3–1	Hearts	Douglas Park
				Attendance: 7,000

4 October 1920 Scottish First Division	Dundee	3–0	Hearts	Dens Park
				Attendance: 14,000

9 October 1920 Scottish First Division	Hearts	1–1	Albion Rovers	Tynecastle Park
				Attendance: 16,500

16 October 1920 Scottish First Division	Queen's Park	1–1	Hearts	Hampden Park
				Attendance: 7,000

23 October 1920 Scottish First Division	Hearts	3–1	Dundee	Tynecastle Park
				Attendance: 19,500

30 October 1920 Scottish First Division	Hearts	0–1	Celtic	Tynecastle Park
				Attendance: 36,500

6 November 1920 Scottish First Division	Airdrieonians	0–1	Hearts	Broomfield Park
				Attendance: 6,000

13 November 1920 Scottish First Division	Hearts	0–0	Aberdeen	Tynecastle Park
				Attendance: 13,500

20 November 1920 Scottish First Division	Queen's Park	2–2	Hearts	Brockville Park
				Attendance: 5,000

27 November 1920 Scottish First Division	Hearts	4–1	Kilmarnock	Tynecastle Park
				Attendance: 13,500

4 December 1920 Scottish First Division	Motherwell	2–2	Hearts	Fir Park
				Attendance: 10,000

11 December 1920 Scottish First Division	Third Lanark	3–0	Hearts	Cathkin Park
				Attendance: 6,000

18 December 1920 Scottish First Division	Hearts	1–0	St Mirren	Tynecastle Park
				Attendance: 11,000

25 December 1920 Scottish First Division	Hearts	6–2	Dumbarton	Tynecastle Park
				Attendance: 12,500

1 January 1921 Scottish First Division	Hibernian	3–0	Hearts	Easter Road
				Attendance: 26,000

3 January 1921 Scottish First Division	Hearts	0–2	Falkirk	Tynecastle Park
				Attendance: 19,500

8 January 1921 Scottish First Division	Hearts	1–0	Partick Thistle	Tynecastle Park
				Attendance: 16,500

15 January 1921 Scottish First Division	Kilmarnock	1–2	Hearts	Rugby Park
				Attendance: 7,000

22 January 1921 Scottish First Division	Partick Thistle	0–0	Hearts	Firhill Park
				Attendance: 8,000

29 January 1921 Scottish First Division	Hearts	0–1	Morton	Tynecastle Park
				Attendance: 18,500

12 February 1921 Scottish First Division	Hearts	1–0	Motherwell	Tynecastle Park
				Attendance: 15,000

23 February 1921 Scottish First Division	Raith Rovers	2–1	Hearts	Stark's Park
				Attendance: 6,000

26 February 1921 Scottish First Division	Hearts	3–0	Third Lanark	Tynecastle Park
				Attendance: 13,000

12 March 1921 Scottish First Division	Hearts	2–1	Airdrieonians	Tynecastle Park
				Attendance: 19,000

19 March 1921 Scottish First Division	Celtic	3–2	Hearts	Celtic Park
				Attendance: 16,000

2 April 1921 Scottish First Division	Hearts	6–0	Clyde	Tynecastle Park
				Attendance: 14,500

9 April 1921 Scottish First Division	Aberdeen	5–2	Hearts	Pittodrie Park
				Attendance: 12,500

11 April 1921 Scottish First Division	Dumbarton	0–3	Hearts	Boghead Park
				Attendance: 3,000

15 April 1921 Scottish First Division	St Mirren	0–4	Hearts	St Mirren Park, Love Street
				Attendance: 3,000

23 April 1921 Scottish First Division	Hearts	4–0	Queen's Park	Tynecastle Park
				Attendance: 12,500

27 April 1921 Scottish First Division	Rangers	0–0	Hearts	Ibrox Park
				Attendance: 15,000

30 April 1921 Scottish First Division	Hearts	3–0	Hamilton Academical	Tynecastle Park
				Attendance: 10,500

== See also ==
- List of Heart of Midlothian F.C. seasons
