= Denial (poem) =

Denial (Greek: Άρνηση) is a poem by Giorgos Seferis (1900–1971) published in his collection Turning Point (Στροφή "Strophe") in 1931. After the coup that overthrew the Greek government in 1967, Seferis went into voluntary seclusion and many of his poems were banned, including the musical versions which Mikis Theodorakis had written and arranged. Denial came to be the anthem of resistance to the regime and was sung by the enormous crowds lining the streets at Seferis' funeral.

ΑΡΝΗΣΗ

Στο περιγιάλι το κρυφό
κι άσπρο σαν περιστέρι
διψάσαμε το μεσημέρι·
μα το νερό γλυφό.

Πάνω στην άμμο την ξανθή
γράψαμε τ' όνομά της·
ωραία που φύσηξεν ο μπάτης
και σβήστηκε η γραφή.

Mε τι καρδιά, με τι πνοή,
τι πόθους και τι πάθος,
πήραμε τη ζωή μας· λάθος!
κι αλλάξαμε ζωή.

DENIAL

On the secret seashore
white like a pigeon
we thirsted at noon;
but the water was brackish.

On the golden sand
we wrote her name;
but the sea-breeze blew
and the writing vanished.

With what spirit, what heart,
what desire and passion
we lived our life; a mistake!
So we changed our life.

—English translation by
Edmund Keeley and Phillip Sherrard

== Sources ==
- George Seferis, Edmund Keeley, Philip Sherrard (Editor) -- (Paperback - 3 July, 1995) ISBN 0-691-01491-4
- George Seferis: Complete Poems George Seferis, Edmund Keeley (Translator), Philip Sherrard (Translator) ISBN 0-85646-214-4
- A Poet's Journal: Days of 1945-1951, George Seferis, Athanasios Anagnostopoulos (Translator) 1583485341
