= Bertie Denyer (footballer, born 1924) =

English footballer

Personal information
- Full name: Albert Thomas Frederick Denyer
- Date of birth: 6 December 1924
- Place of birth: Swindon, England
- Date of death: December 2015 (aged 90–91)
- Place of death: Swindon, England
- Position: Outside forward

Senior career*
Years	Team	Apps	(Gls)
–1945	Garrards Athletic		
1945–1948	Swindon Town	7	(1)
	Cardiff City	0	(0)
	Norwich City	0	(0)
- * Club domestic league appearances and goals

Albert Thomas Frederick Denyer (6 December 1924 – December 2015) was an English professional footballer who played as an outside forward in the Football League for Swindon Town.

== Personal life ==
Denyer's father Bertie was also a footballer for Swindon Town.

== Career statistics ==
Appearances and goals by club, season and competition
Club	Season	League			FA Cup		Total	
Club	Season	Division	Apps	Goals	Apps	Goals	Apps	Goals
Swindon Town	1945–46	—			2	0	2	1
Swindon Town	1946–47	Third Division South	7	1	0	0	7	1
Career total			7	1	2	0	9	1
