= Denier =

Denier may refer to:

== People ==
- Jacques Denier (1894–1983), French painter
- Lydie Denier, French actress
- Robert E. DeNier (1921–2010), American politician
- C. Denier Warren (1889–1971), African-American actor

== Other uses ==
- French denier (penny), a type of medieval coin
- Denier (unit), a unit of linear mass density of fibers
- Denier, Pas-de-Calais, France, a commune
- The Deniers, a 2008 book by Canadian environmentalist Lawrence Solomon

== See also ==
- Diener, German term for "servant; assistant"
- Denyer
