= Denial (Tedlow book) =

- Author: Richard S. Tedlow
- Original title: Denial: Why Business Leaders Fail to Look Facts in the Face—and What to Do About It
- Language: English
- Publisher: Portfolio Hardcover
- Publication date: March 4, 2010
- Media type: Print; e-book
- Pages: 272
- ISBN: 9781591843139

Denial is a book by Richard S. Tedlow that highlights issues within business leadership. The book has two parts. The first portion highlights companies that have struggled to solve matters within their respective businesses while the second part features firms that successfully overcame obstacles. Some of these examples include matters within the Ford Motor Company and their need for product expansion as well as the DuPont Company in Delaware.

The book was published in 2010 by Portfolio (ISBN 9781591843139 ) and, according to WorldCat, is in 565 libraries.

A Chinese translation was published as 啓動你的面對力 : 為何無法面對現實?如何學會不再逃避? / Qǐdòng nǐ de miàn duì lì: Wèihé wúfǎ miàn duì xiànshí? Rúhé xuéhuì bù zài táobì? ISBN 9789866165108

The book has been excerpted in Business Week upon publication. It was reviewed in Time.
