= 1921–22 Heart of Midlothian F.C. season =

Heart of Midlothian
1921–22 season
- Manager: Willie McCartney
- Stadium: Tynecastle Park
- Scottish First Division: 19th
- Scottish Cup: 3rd Round

During the 1921–22 season Hearts competed in the Scottish First Division, the Scottish Cup and the East of Scotland Shield.

== Fixtures ==
=== Scottish Cup ===
28 January 1922 Scottish Cup R1	Hearts	2–1	Arthurlie	Tynecastle Park
				Attendance: 17,000

11 February 1922 Scottish Cup R2	Hearts	2–2	Broxburn United	Tynecastle Park
				Attendance: 22,000

15 February 1922 Scottish Cup R2 Replay	Hearts	2–2	Broxburn United	Tynecastle Park
				Attendance: 20,000

20 February 1922 Scottish Cup R2 2nd Replay	Hearts	2–2	Broxburn United	Tynecastle Park
				Attendance: 14,500

25 February 1922 Scottish Cup R3	Hearts	0–4	Rangers	Tynecastle Park
				Attendance: 40,000

=== Scottish First Division ===
17 August 1921 Scottish First Division	Hamilton Academical	1–0	Hearts	Douglas Park
				Attendance: 7,000

20 August 1921 Scottish First Division	Hearts	2–2	Albion Rovers	Tynecastle Park
				Attendance: 20,500

23 August 1921 Scottish First Division	Clyde	3–2	Hearts	Shawfield Stadium
				Attendance: 5,000

27 August 1921 Scottish First Division	Morton	1–1	Hearts	Cappielow Park
				Attendance: 10,000

3 September 1921 Scottish First Division	Hearts	0–0	Hamilton Academical	Tynecastle Park
				Attendance: 19,000

10 September 1921 Scottish First Division	Hibernian	2–1	Hearts	Easter Road
				Attendance: 20,000

17 September 1921 Scottish First Division	Hearts	0–1	Clyde	Tynecastle Park
				Attendance: 17,000

19 September 1921 Scottish First Division	Hearts	1–2	Rangers	Tynecastle Park
				Attendance: 25,000

24 September 1921 Scottish First Division	Partick Thistle	1–1	Hearts	Firhill Park
				Attendance: 16,000

1 October 1921 Scottish First Division	Hearts	4–1	Falkirk	Tynecastle Park
				Attendance: 19,500

8 October 1921 Scottish First Division	Rangers	0–2	Hearts	Ibrox Park
				Attendance: 35,000

15 October 1921 Scottish First Division	Hearts	0–0	Dundee	Tynecastle Park
				Attendance: 26,500

22 October 1921 Scottish First Division	Ayr United	2–1	Hearts	Somerset Park
				Attendance: 4,000

29 October 1921 Scottish First Division	Hearts	2–0	Dumbarton	Tynecastle Park
				Attendance: 15,500

5 November 1921 Scottish First Division	Celtic	3–0	Hearts	Celtic Park
				Attendance: 20,000

12 November 1921 Scottish First Division	Motherwell	3–1	Hearts	Fir Park
				Attendance: 6,000

19 November 1921 Scottish First Division	Hearts	1–1	Raith Rovers	Tynecastle Park
				Attendance: 18,500

26 November 1921 Scottish First Division	Clydebank	1–1	Hearts	Clydeholm Park
				Attendance: 4,000

3 December 1921 Scottish First Division	Hearts	2–1	Aberdeen	Tynecastle Park
				Attendance: 18,000

10 December 1921 Scottish First Division	Queen's Park	1–1	Hearts	Hampden Park
				Attendance: 10,000

17 December 1921 Scottish First Division	Hearts	4–0	Airdrieonians	Tynecastle Park
				Attendance: 13,500

24 December 1921 Scottish First Division	Third Lanark	2–0	Hearts	Cathkin Park
				Attendance: 7,000

26 December 1921 Scottish First Division	Hearts	1–0	Kilmarnock	Tynecastle Park
				Attendance: 7,000

31 December 1921 Scottish First Division	Kilmarnock	3–0	Hearts	Rugby Park
				Attendance: 7,000

2 January 1922 Scottish First Division	Hearts	0–2	Hibernian	Tynecastle Park
				Attendance: 30,500

3 January 1922 Scottish First Division	Hearts	3–2	St Mirren	Tynecastle Park
				Attendance: 13,000

7 January 1922 Scottish First Division	Raith Rovers	3–1	Hearts	Stark's Park
				Attendance: 12,000

14 January 1922 Scottish First Division	Hearts	0–1	Queen's Park	Tynecastle Park
				Attendance: 12,000

21 January 1922 Scottish First Division	Hearts	3–1	Third Lanark	Tynecastle Park
				Attendance: 11,500

4 February 1922 Scottish First Division	Falkirk	0–1	Hearts	Brockville Park
				Attendance: 8,000

18 February 1922 Scottish First Division	Airdrieonians	3–0	Hearts	Broomfield Park
				Attendance: 6,000

1 March 1922 Scottish First Division	Albion Rovers	2–0	Hearts	Cliftonhill
				Attendance: 5,000

4 March 1922 Scottish First Division	Hearts	6–2	Ayr United	Tynecastle Park
				Attendance: 12,000

11 March 1922 Scottish First Division	Hearts	3–0	Clydebank	Tynecastle Park
				Attendance: 14,000

18 March 1922 Scottish First Division	Dundee	2–0	Hearts	Dens Park
				Attendance: 12,000

25 March 1922 Scottish First Division	Hearts	1–2	Celtic	Tynecastle Park
				Attendance: 11,000

29 March 1922 Scottish First Division	Hearts	0–0	Motherwell	Tynecastle Park
				Attendance: 8,500

1 April 1922 Scottish First Division	Hearts	1–3	Partick Thistle	Tynecastle Park
				Attendance: 16,500

8 April 1922 Scottish First Division	Hearts	0–0	Morton	Tynecastle Park
				Attendance: 14,500

15 April 1922 Scottish First Division	St Mirren	2–1	Hearts	St Mirren Park, Love Street
				Attendance: 6,000

22 April 1922 Scottish First Division	Dumbarton	3–2	Hearts	Boghead Park
				Attendance: 5,000

29 April 1922 Scottish First Division	Aberdeen	0–1	Hearts	Pittodrie Park
				Attendance: 8,000

== See also ==
- List of Heart of Midlothian F.C. seasons
