= 1917–18 Heart of Midlothian F.C. season =

Heart of Midlothian
1917–1918 season
- Manager: John McCartney
- Stadium: Tynecastle Park
- Scottish First Division: 10th

During the 1917–18 season Hearts competed in the Scottish First Division and the East of Scotland Shield.

== Fixtures ==
=== Dunedin Cup ===
2 January 1918 Dunedin Cup SF	Hearts	1–3	Falkirk	Tynecastle Park

=== Wilson Cup ===
1 January 1918 Wilson Cup Final	Hearts	1–3	Hibernian	Tynecastle Park

=== Rosebery Charity Cup ===
18 May 1918 Rosebery Charity Cup Final	Hearts	0–2	Hibernian	Tynecastle Park

=== Scottish Football League ===
18 August 1917 Scottish First Division	Hearts	2–1	St Mirren	Tynecastle Park
				Attendance: 6,000

25 August 1917 Scottish First Division	Queen's Park	4–0	Hearts	Hampden Park
				Attendance: 8,000

1 September 1917 Scottish First Division	Hearts	1–0	Hibernian	Tynecastle Park
				Attendance: 7,500

8 September 1917 Scottish First Division	Motherwell	4–0	Hearts	Fir Park
				Attendance: 7,000

15 September 1917 Scottish First Division	Hearts	1–0	Morton	Tynecastle Park
				Attendance: 8,000

22 September 1917 Scottish First Division	Falkirk	4–0	Hearts	Brockville Park
				Attendance: 3,000

29 September 1917 Scottish First Division	Hearts	0–1	Celtic	Tynecastle Park
				Attendance: 15,000

6 October 1917 Scottish First Division	Kilmarnock	4–3	Hearts	Rugby Park
				Attendance: 4,000

13 October 1917 Scottish First Division	Partick Thistle	4–1	Hearts	Firhill Park
				Attendance: 10,000

20 October 1917 Scottish First Division	Hearts	2–0	Ayr United	Tynecastle Park
				Attendance: 7,500

27 October 1917 Scottish First Division	Hearts	1–0	Airdrieonians	Tynecastle Park
				Attendance: 7,500

3 November 1917 Scottish First Division	Clydebank	3–1	Hearts	Clydeholm Park
				Attendance: 6,000

10 November 1917 Scottish First Division	Hearts	0–3	Rangers	Tynecastle Park
				Attendance: 12,500

17 November 1917 Scottish First Division	Hamilton Academical	0–3	Hearts	Douglas Park
				Attendance: 4,000

24 November 1917 Scottish First Division	Hearts	0–2	Falkirk	Tynecastle Park
				Attendance: 5,500

1 December 1917 Scottish First Division	Clyde	3–0	Hearts	Shawfield Stadium
				Attendance: 4,000

8 December 1917 Scottish First Division	Hearts	3–0	Kilmarnock	Tynecastle Park
				Attendance: 8,000

15 December 1917 Scottish First Division	Morton	1–1	Hearts	Cappielow Park
				Attendance: 6,000

22 December 1917 Scottish First Division	Hearts	0–1	Motherwell	Tynecastle Park
				Attendance: 5,500

29 December 1917 Scottish First Division	Dumbarton	1–1	Hearts	Boghead Park
				Attendance: 3,000

5 January 1918 Scottish First Division	Hearts	2–1	Queen's Park	Tynecastle Park
				Attendance: 6,500

12 January 1918 Scottish First Division	Rangers	2–0	Hearts	Ibrox Park
				Attendance: 6,000

26 January 1918 Scottish First Division	Hearts	3–2	Hamilton Academical	Tynecastle Park
				Attendance: 16,000

2 February 1918 Scottish First Division	Hibernian	1–3	Hearts	Easter Road
				Attendance: 8,000

9 February 1918 Scottish First Division	Celtic	3–0	Hearts	Celtic Park
				Attendance: 6,000

16 February 1918 Scottish First Division	Hearts	1–0	Clydebank	Tynecastle Park
				Attendance: 8,000

23 February 1918 Scottish First Division	Hearts	3–1	Third Lanark	Tynecastle Park
				Attendance: 7,500

9 March 1918 Scottish First Division	Airdrieonians	0–1	Hearts	Broomfield Park
				Attendance: 3,000

16 March 1918 Scottish First Division	Hearts	3–0	Clyde	Tynecastle Park
				Attendance: 6,000

23 March 1918 Scottish First Division	Ayr United	1–1	Hearts	Somerset Park
				Attendance: 3,000

30 March 1918 Scottish First Division	Hearts	1–1	Partick Thistle	Tynecastle Park
				Attendance: 6,000

6 April 1918 Scottish First Division	Third Lanark	2–3	Hearts	Cathkin Park
				Attendance: 8,000

13 April 1918 Scottish First Division	Hearts	1–2	Dumbarton	Tynecastle Park
				Attendance: 4,500

20 April 1918 Scottish First Division	St Mirren	3–2	Hearts	St Mirren Park, Love Street
				Attendance: 3,000

== See also ==
- List of Heart of Midlothian F.C. seasons
