= Terence Denyer =

Zimbabwean cricketer (born 1981)

Personal information
- Full name: Terence Gerald Denyer
- Born: 26 May 1981 (age 45); Umtali, Manicaland, Zimbabwe
- Batting: Right-handed
- Bowling: Right-arm leg break

Domestic team information
- Years: Team
- 1999/2000–2000/01: Manicaland

Career statistics
Competition	FC
Matches	9
Runs scored	69
Batting average	4.20
100s/50s	0/0
Top score	26
Balls bowled	361
Wickets	10
Bowling average	23.30
5 wickets in innings	0
10 wickets in match	0
Best bowling	3/27
Catches/stumpings	5/–
- Source: ESPNcricinfo, 17 July 2021

Terence Gerald Denyer (born 26 May 1981) is a former Zimbabwean cricketer. Born in Umtali (now Mutare), he is a right-handed batsman and right-arm leg break bowler. He played nine first-class matches in the Logan Cup for his home province Manicaland between 2000 and 2001.
