= Refusal =

Refusal may refer to:

- "The Refusal", a 1920 short story by Franz Kafka
- Refusals and runouts, a concept in equestrianism
- Refusal of work
- Refusal to deal
- Refusal of medical assistance
- Refusal skills
- Driven to refusal, an engineering/surveying term used in pile-driving

== See also ==
- Refuse
- Refused
- Denial (disambiguation)
- Deny (disambiguation)
