= 1918–19 Heart of Midlothian F.C. season =

Heart of Midlothian
1918–1919 season
- Manager: John McCartney
- Stadium: Tynecastle Park
- Scottish First Division: 7th
- Victory Cup: Finalists

During the 1918–19 season Hearts competed in the Scottish First Division, the Victory Cup and the East of Scotland Shield.

== Fixtures ==
=== Wilson Cup ===
1 January 1919 Wilson Cup Final	Hearts	2–2	Hibernian	Tynecastle Park

7 May 1919 Wilson Cup Final	Hearts	1–0	Hibernian	Tynecastle Park

=== Rosebery Charity Cup ===
17 May 1919 Rosebery Charity Cup Final	Hearts	2–1	Hibernian	Tynecastle Park

=== Victory Cup ===
15 March 1919 Victory Cup R2	Third Lanark	1–2	Hearts	Cathkin Park

29 March 1919 Victory Cup R3	Partick Thistle	0–2	Hearts	Firhill Park

19 April 1919 Victory Cup SF	Hearts	7–1	Airdrieonians	Tynecastle Park

26 April 1919 Victory Cup Final	Hearts	0–3	St Mirren	Celtic Park
				Attendance: 65,000

=== Scottish Football League ===
17 August 1918 Scottish First Division	Morton	2–0	Hearts	Cappielow Park
				Attendance: 8,000

24 August 1918 Scottish First Division	Hearts	1–4	Rangers	Tynecastle Park
				Attendance: 14,500

31 August 1918 Scottish First Division	Airdrieonians	1–0	Hearts	Broomfield Park
				Attendance: 3,000

7 September 1918 Scottish First Division	Hearts	0–0	Motherwell	Tynecastle Park
				Attendance: 7,000

14 September 1918 Scottish First Division	Hearts	0–0	St Mirren	Tynecastle Park
				Attendance: 6,000

21 September 1918 Scottish First Division	Dumbarton	1–2	Hearts	Boghead Park
				Attendance: 2,000

28 September 1918 Scottish First Division	Hearts	1–0	Partick Thistle	Tynecastle Park
				Attendance: 7,000

5 October 1918 Scottish First Division	Hamilton Academical	1–4	Hearts	Douglas Park
				Attendance: 4,000

12 October 1918 Scottish First Division	Hearts	2–3	Ayr United	Tynecastle Park
				Attendance: 8,000

19 October 1918 Scottish First Division	Hibernian	1–3	Hearts	Easter Road
				Attendance: 3,000

26 October 1918 Scottish First Division	Clyde	4–2	Hearts	Shawfield Stadium
				Attendance: 4,000

2 November 1918 Scottish First Division	Hearts	1–4	Kilmarnock	Tynecastle Park
				Attendance: 6,500

9 November 1918 Scottish First Division	Celtic	1–1	Hearts	Celtic Park
				Attendance: 11,000

16 November 1918 Scottish First Division	Hearts	5–0	Kilmarnock	Tynecastle Park
				Attendance: 6,500

23 November 1918 Scottish First Division	Hearts	2–0	Third Lanark	Tynecastle Park
				Attendance: 6,000

7 December 1918 Scottish First Division	Hearts	2–1	Clydebank	Tynecastle Park
				Attendance: 7,500

14 December 1918 Scottish First Division	Partick Thistle	1–3	Hearts	Fir Park
				Attendance: 10,000

21 December 1918 Scottish First Division	Falkirk	0–0	Hearts	Brockville Park
				Attendance: 4,000

28 December 1918 Scottish First Division	Hearts	0–0	Airdrieonians	Tynecastle Park
				Attendance: 7,500

4 January 1919 Scottish First Division	Ayr United	1–2	Hearts	Somerset Park
				Attendance: 9,000

11 January 1919 Scottish First Division	Hearts	3–1	Hibernian	Tynecastle Park
				Attendance: 15,000

18 January 1919 Scottish First Division	Third Lanark	1–3	Hearts	Cathkin Park
				Attendance: 8,000

25 January 1919 Scottish First Division	Queen's Park	4–0	Hearts	Hampden Park
				Attendance: 10,000

1 February 1919 Scottish First Division	Hearts	4–1	Hamilton Academical	Tynecastle Park
				Attendance: 10,500

8 February 1919 Scottish First Division	Clydebank	1–3	Hearts	Clydeholm Park
				Attendance: 6,000

15 February 1919 Scottish First Division	Hearts	2–2	Queen's Park	Tynecastle Park
				Attendance: 12,000

22 February 1919 Scottish First Division	Kilmarnock	2–2	Hearts	Rugby Park
				Attendance: 5,000

1 March 1919 Scottish First Division	Rangers	3–2	Hearts	Ibrox Park
				Attendance: 25,000

8 March 1919 Scottish First Division	Motherwell	1–2	Hearts	Fir Park
				Attendance: 5,000

22 March 1919 Scottish First Division	Hearts	3–0	Clyde	Tynecastle Park
				Attendance: 10,500

5 April 1919 Scottish First Division	Hearts	1–1	Morton	Tynecastle Park
				Attendance: 17,500

28 April 1919 Scottish First Division	Hearts	2–3	Celtic	Tynecastle Park
				Attendance: 16,000

3 May 1919 Scottish First Division	Hearts	2–0	Dumbarton	Tynecastle Park
				Attendance: 10,500

10 May 1919 Scottish First Division	St Mirren	3–3	Hearts	St Mirren Park, Love Street
				Attendance: 2,000

== See also ==
- List of Heart of Midlothian F.C. seasons
