= 1916–17 Heart of Midlothian F.C. season =

Heart of Midlothian
1916–1917 season
- Manager: John McCartney
- Stadium: Tynecastle Park
- Scottish First Division: 14th

During the 1916–17 season Hearts competed in the Scottish First Division and the East of Scotland Shield.

== Fixtures ==
=== Wilson Cup ===
1 January 1917 Wilson Cup Final	Hibernian	3–0	Hearts	Easter Road

=== Rosebery Charity Cup ===
5 May 1917 Rosebery Charity Cup Semi-Final	Hearts	3–0	Hibernian	Tynecastle Park

12 May 1917 Rosebery Charity Cup Final	Hearts	5–3	Armadale	Tynecastle Park

=== Scottish Football League ===
19 August 1916 Scottish First Division	Morton	3–2	Hearts	Cappielow Park
				Attendance: 7,000

26 August 1916 Scottish First Division	Hearts	1–3	Rangers	Tynecastle Park
				Attendance: 10,500

2 September 1916 Scottish First Division	Airdrieonians	3–2	Hearts	Broomfield Park
				Attendance: 5,000

9 September 1916 Scottish First Division	Hearts	2–1	Third Lanark	Tynecastle Park
				Attendance: 8,500

16 September 1916 Scottish First Division	Ayr United	2–0	Hearts	Somerset Park
				Attendance: 4,000

18 September 1916 Scottish First Division	Hearts	2–1	Hibernian	Tynecastle Park
				Attendance: 5,500

23 September 1916 Scottish First Division	Hearts	1–6	Falkirk	Tynecastle Park
				Attendance: 8,500

30 September 1916 Scottish First Division	Celtic	1–0	Hearts	Celtic Park
				Attendance: 12,000

7 October 1916 Scottish First Division	Hearts	2–1	Raith Rovers	Tynecastle Park
				Attendance: 7,000

14 October 1916 Scottish First Division	Kilmarnock	0–3	Hearts	Rugby Park
				Attendance: 1,000

21 October 1916 Scottish First Division	Hearts	0–3	Clyde	Tynecastle Park
				Attendance: 8,000

28 October 1916 Scottish First Division	Hamilton Academical	1–0	Hearts	Douglas Park
				Attendance: 4,000

4 November 1916 Scottish First Division	Hearts	1–0	Partick Thistle	Tynecastle Park
				Attendance: 6,000

11 November 1916 Scottish First Division	St Mirren	0–1	Hearts	St Mirren Park, Love Street
				Attendance: 4,000

18 November 1916 Scottish First Division	Aberdeen	2–0	Hearts	Pittodrie Park
				Attendance: 1,500

25 November 1916 Scottish First Division	Hearts	2–0	Queen's Park	Tynecastle Park
				Attendance: 3,500

2 December 1916 Scottish First Division	Hearts	0–1	Dumbarton	Tynecastle Park
				Attendance: 4,000

9 December 1916 Scottish First Division	Motherwell	2–0	Hearts	Fir Park
				Attendance: 4,000

16 December 1916 Scottish First Division	Hearts	1–0	Dundee	Tynecastle Park
				Attendance: 5,000

23 December 1916 Scottish First Division	Hearts	1–2	Ayr United	Tynecastle Park
				Attendance: 2,500

30 December 1916 Scottish First Division	Third Lanark	1–1	Hearts	Cathkin Park
				Attendance: 4,000

2 January 1917 Scottish First Division	Hearts	3–1	Hamilton Academical	Tynecastle Park
				Attendance: 2,000

6 January 1917 Scottish First Division	Rangers	1–0	Hearts	Ibrox Park
				Attendance: 12,000

13 January 1917 Scottish First Division	Hearts	0–1	Celtic	Tynecastle Park
				Attendance: 12,000

20 January 1917 Scottish First Division	Raith Rovers	1–4	Hearts	Stark's Park
				Attendance: 2,000

27 January 1917 Scottish First Division	Dundee	2–3	Hearts	Dens Park
				Attendance: 4,000

3 February 1917 Scottish First Division	Dumbarton	4–1	Hearts	Boghead Park
				Attendance: 3,000

10 February 1917 Scottish First Division	Hearts	2–0	Aberdeen	Tynecastle Park
				Attendance: 6,000

17 February 1917 Scottish First Division	Partick Thistle	0–0	Hearts	Firhill Park
				Attendance: 12,000

24 February 1917 Scottish First Division	Hearts	1–3	Motherwell	Tynecastle Park
				Attendance: 6,000

3 March 1917 Scottish First Division	Hearts	1–2	St Mirren	Tynecastle Park
				Attendance: 6,000

10 March 1917 Scottish First Division	Hearts	1–4	Airdrieonians	Tynecastle Park
				Attendance: 5,500

17 March 1917 Scottish First Division	Clyde	0–1	Hearts	Shawfield Stadium
				Attendance: 3,000

24 March 1917 Scottish First Division	Falkirk	2–1	Hearts	Brockville Park
				Attendance: 3,000

31 March 1917 Scottish First Division	Hearts	4–1	Morton	Tynecastle Park
				Attendance: 5,500

7 April 1917 Scottish First Division	Hearts	0–0	Kilmarnock	Tynecastle Park
				Attendance: 7,500

16 April 1917 Scottish First Division	Hibernian	0–2	Hearts	Easter Road
				Attendance: 5,000

28 April 1917 Scottish First Division	Queen's Park	1–1	Hearts	Hampden Park
				Attendance: 2,000

== See also ==
- List of Heart of Midlothian F.C. seasons
