= 1933–34 Scottish Division One =

35th season of top-tier football league in Scotland

Scottish Division One
- Season: 1933–34
- Champions: Rangers
- Relegated: Third Lanark; Cowdenbeath

The 1933–34 Scottish Division One season was won by Rangers by four points over nearest rival Motherwell. Third Lanark and Cowdenbeath finished 19th and 20th respectively and were relegated to the 1934–35 Scottish Division Two.

== League table ==
Pos	Team	Pld	W	D	L	GF	GA	GD	Pts	Qualification or relegation
1	Rangers	38	30	6	2	118	41	+77	66	Champions
2	Motherwell	38	29	4	5	97	45	+52	62	
3	Celtic	38	18	11	9	78	53	+25	47	
4	Queen of the South	38	21	3	14	75	48	+27	45	
5	Aberdeen	38	18	8	12	90	57	+33	44	
6	Heart of Midlothian	38	17	10	11	86	59	+27	44	
7	Kilmarnock	38	17	9	12	73	64	+9	43	
8	Ayr United	38	16	10	12	87	92	−5	42	
9	St Johnstone	38	17	6	15	74	53	+21	40	
10	Falkirk	38	16	6	16	73	68	+5	38	
11	Hamilton Academical	38	15	8	15	65	79	−14	38	
12	Dundee	38	15	6	17	68	64	+4	36	
13	Partick Thistle	38	14	5	19	73	78	−5	33	
14	Clyde	38	10	11	17	56	70	−14	31	
15	Queen's Park	38	13	5	20	65	85	−20	31	
16	Hibernian	38	12	3	23	51	69	−18	27	
17	St Mirren	38	9	9	20	46	75	−29	27	
18	Airdrieonians	38	10	6	22	59	103	−44	26	
19	Third Lanark	38	8	9	21	62	103	−41	25	Relegated to Second Division
20	Cowdenbeath	38	5	5	28	58	118	−60	15	Relegated to Second Division

Source: RSSSF

== Results ==
Home \ Away	ABE	AIR	AYR	CEL	CLY	COW	DND	FAL	HAM	HOM	HIB	KIL	MOT	PAR	QOS	QPA	RAN	STJ	STM	THI
Aberdeen		4–0	8–0	3–0	4–0	5–0	1–3	5–0	5–1	0–1	2–1	2–0	1–1	3–0	5–0	2–2	1–2	1–1	0–0	3–0
Airdrieonians	0–1		1–1	2–4	1–0	2–0	2–1	2–2	3–4	3–2	0–3	3–1	3–6	2–1	2–5	3–4	2–7	1–1	4–1	1–2
Ayr United	1–2	1–1		3–1	4–2	6–2	3–3	1–0	3–1	4–3	4–1	1–1	2–3	3–1	0–3	2–6	0–2	3–2	2–2	5–1
Celtic	2–2	4–2	0–3		2–1	7–0	3–2	2–2	5–1	0–0	2–1	4–1	3–0	2–0	0–1	3–1	2–2	0–0	3–0	3–1
Clyde	2–2	4–2	5–2	1–1		2–3	3–0	2–0	0–2	1–2	1–0	0–1	0–1	3–3	3–1	1–1	1–6	3–0	0–0	4–2
Cowdenbeath	2–4	1–3	2–2	0–1	5–1		1–1	0–3	4–0	1–5	2–4	0–1	0–4	1–1	1–3	0–2	3–4	1–5	6–0	3–1
Dundee	1–1	4–0	2–1	3–2	1–1	4–2		1–3	1–1	0–1	1–0	0–2	2–3	1–2	8–0	1–0	0–6	3–0	3–0	3–0
Falkirk	6–5	0–2	2–3	2–0	2–2	4–3	2–1		2–0	2–1	3–1	2–2	1–3	3–0	3–0	5–1	1–3	4–0	2–1	3–3
Hamilton Academical	2–1	4–2	1–1	1–1	1–0	1–0	3–2	2–1		1–1	4–1	2–2	1–2	3–7	0–2	1–0	1–2	4–1	1–2	2–2
Heart of Midlothian	0–0	8–1	1–1	2–1	1–1	5–4	6–1	3–1	4–2		0–0	1–1	1–3	1–0	1–3	4–0	1–2	2–1	6–0	5–1
Hibernian	3–2	0–2	0–0	1–2	3–0	6–1	2–1	1–3	1–2	1–4		4–1	0–2	0–2	0–2	2–1	0–0	2–6	2–1	3–1
Kilmarnock	2–0	7–1	4–2	4–3	2–2	4–1	1–3	1–1	1–1	2–5	2–0		1–3	2–0	3–0	3–1	1–3	1–0	3–0	1–2
Motherwell	4–1	3–1	5–2	1–1	1–2	6–1	1–0	2–1	2–1	2–1	2–1	2–0		2–3	1–2	3–0	2–1	1–0	1–0	2–2
Partick Thistle	4–0	1–0	5–1	0–3	2–0	5–3	1–1	0–3	1–2	7–2	3–2	2–3	1–4		1–1	5–2	3–4	0–3	2–3	3–0
Queen of the South	4–1	1–1	2–4	3–2	2–2	4–0	3–1	2–1	3–1	3–1	1–0	4–1	0–5	4–3		1–4	0–4	2–3	0–1	5–1
Queen's Park	1–5	2–1	4–5	2–3	1–2	1–0	2–4	1–0	2–4	1–1	2–1	3–4	1–5	0–1	4–2		1–1	1–0	0–0	4–2
Rangers	2–1	5–1	9–1	2–2	3–1	3–1	1–0	3–1	4–2	3–1	6–0	2–2	4–2	2–2	5–1	4–0		3–0	3–0	1–0
St Johnstone	5–1	4–0	0–2	1–1	1–0	3–3	0–1	3–0	5–1	3–1	0–1	0–3	1–2	4–0	4–0	1–0	3–1		1–1	4–1
St Mirren	2–3	1–1	1–1	1–2	2–0	0–0	0–3	3–1	2–3	1–1	0–3	3–1	1–3	2–0	0–3	1–2	1–2	1–4		7–2
Third Lanark	2–3	3–1	3–7	1–1	3–3	5–1	4–1	3–1	1–1	1–1	1–0	1–1	2–2	3–1	1–2	2–5	0–1	1–4	1–5	

Legend: Blue = home team win; Yellow = draw; Red = away team win.
