= 1919–20 Heart of Midlothian F.C. season =

Heart of Midlothian
1919–20 season
- Manager: John McCartney (to November); Willie McCartney (from November)
- Stadium: Tynecastle Park
- Scottish Football League: 15th
- Scottish Cup: 3rd Round

During the 1919–20 season Hearts competed in the Scottish Football League, the Scottish Cup and the East of Scotland Shield.

== Fixtures ==
=== Wilson Cup ===
5 May 1920 Wilson Cup Final	Hearts	3–1	Hibernian	Tynecastle Park

=== Rosebery Charity Cup ===
12 May 1920 Rosebery Charity Cup Semi-Final	Hearts	5–0	St Bernard's	Tynecastle Park

15 May 1920 Rosebery Charity Cup Final	Hearts	2–0	Hibernian	Tynecastle Park

=== Scottish Cup ===
15 May 1920 Scottish Cup R1	Hearts	5–1	Nithsdale Wanderers	Tynecastle Park
				Attendance: 12,000

7 February 1920 Scottish Cup R2	Hearts	2–0	Falkirk	Tynecastle Park
				Attendance: 31,000

21 February 1920 Scottish Cup R3	Aberdeen	1–0	Hearts	Pittodrie Park
				Attendance: 21,000

=== Scottish First Division ===
16 August 1919 Scottish First Division	Hearts	3–1	Queen's Park	Tynecastle Park
				Attendance: 17,500

23 August 1919 Scottish First Division	Ayr United	1–2	Hearts	Somerset Park
				Attendance: 7,000

30 August 1919 Scottish First Division	Hearts	2–0	Hamilton Academical	Tynecastle Park
				Attendance: 17,000

6 September 1919 Scottish First Division	Raith Rovers	0–1	Hearts	Stark's Park
				Attendance: 15,000

13 September 1919 Scottish First Division	Hearts	0–1	Celtic	Tynecastle Park
				Attendance: 40,700

15 September 1919 Scottish First Division	Hibernian	2–4	Hearts	Easter Road
				Attendance: 18,000

20 September 1919 Scottish First Division	Dundee	1–0	Hearts	Dens Park
				Attendance: 16,000

27 September 1919 Scottish First Division	Hearts	4–2	Clydebank	Tynecastle Park
				Attendance: 17,000

29 September 1919 Scottish First Division	Rangers	3–0	Hearts	Ibrox Park
				Attendance: 40,000

4 October 1919 Scottish First Division	Morton	2–0	Hearts	Cappielow Park
				Attendance: 8,000

11 October 1919 Scottish First Division	Hearts	0–0	Albion Rovers	Tynecastle Park
				Attendance: 14,000

18 October 1919 Scottish First Division	Clyde	0–1	Hearts	Shawfield Stadium
				Attendance: 2,000

25 October 1919 Scottish First Division	Hearts	1–1	Aberdeen	Tynecastle Park
				Attendance: 18,500

1 November 1919 Scottish First Division	Hearts	2–0	Motherwell	Tynecastle Park
				Attendance: 15,500

8 November 1919 Scottish First Division	St Mirren	4–1	Hearts	St Mirren Park, Love Street
				Attendance: 6,000

15 November 1919 Scottish First Division	Hearts	3–1	Airdrieonians	Tynecastle Park
				Attendance: 13,500

22 November 1919 Scottish First Division	Kilmarnock	2–1	Hearts	Rugby Park
				Attendance: 6,000

29 November 1919 Scottish First Division	Dumbarton	2–0	Hearts	Boghead Park
				Attendance: 3,000

6 December 1919 Scottish First Division	Hearts	3–1	Partick Thistle	Tynecastle Park
				Attendance: 15,000

13 December 1919 Scottish First Division	Falkirk	3–3	Hearts	Brockville Park
				Attendance: 6,000

20 December 1919 Scottish First Division	Hearts	1–2	St Mirren	Tynecastle Park
				Attendance: 15,000

27 December 1919 Scottish First Division	Hearts	3–6	Morton	Tynecastle Park
				Attendance: 14,000

1 January 1920 Scottish First Division	Hearts	1–3	Hibernian	Tynecastle Park
				Attendance: 22,000

3 January 1920 Scottish First Division	Motherwell	4–1	Hearts	Tynecastle Park
				Attendance: 8,000

5 January 1920 Scottish First Division	Hearts	0–1	Ayr United	Tynecastle Park
				Attendance: 8,000

10 January 1920 Scottish First Division	Hearts	1–1	Third Lanark	Tynecastle Park
				Attendance: 11,500

17 January 1920 Scottish First Division	Aberdeen	1–1	Hearts	Pittodrie Park
				Attendance: 14,000

31 January 1920 Scottish First Division	Partick Thistle	0–2	Hearts	Firhill Park
				Attendance: 20,000

14 February 1920 Scottish First Division	Hearts	2–1	Dundee	Tynecastle Park
				Attendance: 23,000

28 February 1920 Scottish First Division	Hearts	1–1	Raith Rovers	Tynecastle Park
				Attendance: 12,000

6 March 1920 Scottish First Division	Queen's Park	2–2	Hearts	Hampden Park
				Attendance: 10,000

13 March 1920 Scottish First Division	Hamilton Academical	2–2	Hearts	Douglas Park
				Attendance: 3,000

20 March 1920 Scottish First Division	Hearts	0–3	Clyde	Tynecastle Park
				Attendance: 12,000

27 March 1920 Scottish First Division	Clydebank	0–1	Hearts	Clydeholm Park
				Attendance: 3,000

3 April 1920 Scottish First Division	Albion Rovers	6–2	Hearts	Cliftonhill
				Attendance: 4,000

10 April 1920 Scottish First Division	Hearts	0–0	Rangers	Tynecastle Park
				Attendance: 26,000

17 April 1920 Scottish First Division	Hearts	1–2	Dumbarton	Tynecastle Park
				Attendance: 14,000

19 April 1920 Scottish First Division	Hearts	3–0	Falkirk	Tynecastle Park
				Attendance: 6,500

21 April 1920 Scottish First Division	Airdrieonians	4–1	Hearts	Broomfield Park
				Attendance: 5,000

24 April 1920 Scottish First Division	Third Lanark	2–1	Hearts	Cathkin Park
				Attendance: 7,000

28 April 1920 Scottish First Division	Hearts	0–1	Kilmarnock	Tynecastle Park
				Attendance: 8,000

1 May 1920 Scottish First Division	Celtic	3–0	Hearts	Tynecastle Park
				Attendance: 8,000

== See also ==
- List of Heart of Midlothian F.C. seasons
