= Wilson Cup (football) =

Football award in Edinburgh, Scotland

- Sport: Football (soccer)
- Founded: 1906
- No. of teams: Heart of Midlothian (Hearts) and Hibernian (Hibs)
- Country: Scotland
- Most recent champion: Hibernian (1945)

The Wilson Cup was a Scottish football trophy donated by Robert Wilson (1871-1928), who was the editor of the Edinburgh Evening News and a director of Heart of Midlothian. The cup was played annually between Edinburgh derby rivals Heart of Midlothian and Hibernian. It was either played on 1 January, at the beginning of the season or at the end.

The competition ran from the 1905–06 season to the 1945–46 season, Hearts winning 21 times and Hibs 14.

Initially intended to be a trophy for the winner of the annual New Year Scottish Football League fixture between the clubs before becoming a challenge match in its own right, on a few occasions the game was played as part of a 'double header', also counting for the East of Scotland Shield. In May 1919 the 2nd leg of the Shield counted as the Wilson Cup final replay. In May 1920 the Shield replay counted as the final of the Wilson Cup and in 1921 it counted as the semi-final of the Shield as well.

== History ==
Hibernian won the first trophy on 1 January 1906 beating Heart of Midlothian by 1-0. On 15 August 1945, Hibernian won the last edition beating Heart of Midlothian by 4-1.

== See also ==
- East of Scotland Shield
- Rosebery Charity Cup
