= East of Scotland Shield =

UK sports league

- Sport: Football
- Founded: 1875
- No. of teams: Varied (currently 2)
- Country: Scotland
- Most recent champion: Heart of Midlothian

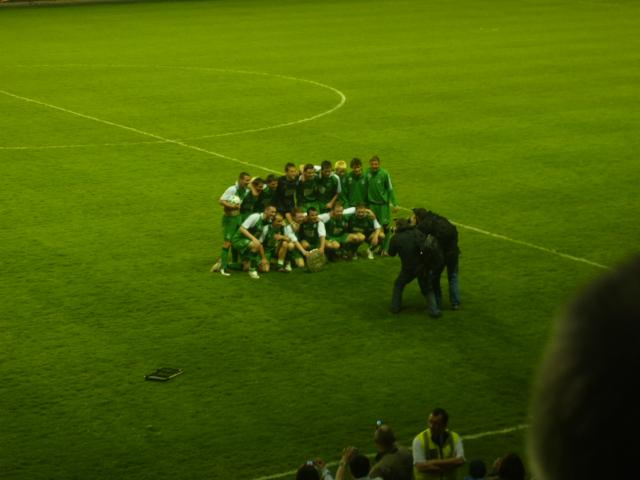
Hibernian are presented with the Shield after winning the one-off match on 7 May 2008

The East of Scotland Shield is a Scottish football trophy awarded by the East of Scotland Football Association. The only older cup competition in Scottish football is the Scottish Cup. The tournament is the third-oldest in world football still competed for annually, after the FA Cup and the Scottish Cup. The next oldest tournament in world football is the Sheffield and Hallamshire Senior Cup; the next oldest tournament in Scottish football is the Renfrewshire Cup.

The competition was initially known as the Edinburgh F.A. Cup. Hibernian won the Cup outright by winning it in three successive years from 1879 to 1881, which meant that it was renamed the East of Scotland Shield. It played a significant part in establishing Hibernian ("Hibs") and Heart of Midlothian ("Hearts") as the predominant football clubs in Edinburgh, as the 1878 Edinburgh Cup went to four replays and built interest in the two newly formed clubs.

The competition was a knockout tournament for football clubs based in Edinburgh and the surrounding area. Besides Hearts and Hibs, these clubs included Alloa Athletic, Armadale, Bathgate, Berwick Rangers, Bo'ness, Bonnyrigg Rose, Cowdenbeath, Edinburgh University, Leith Athletic, Lochgelly United, Meadowbank Thistle and St Bernard's.

Hearts and Hibs, traditionally the strongest clubs in the area, contested most of the finals. Declining attendances meant that the competition was no longer contested after 1989–90 as an adult-level cup. It continued as a youth tournament and was revived in 2004 as an annual one-off match between Hearts and Hibs youth teams, acting as a fundraiser for the East of Scotland Football Association.

== Trophy ==
A second trophy was commissioned in 1882 to the replace the original. The centrepiece of the Shield depicted a scene from the England v Scotland match at the Oval in 1875 that was published by Illustrated Sporting and Dramatic News that year (and again in 1879). The only difference was they flipped the goal so it was on the right.

== Winners ==
The following list is incomplete.

Season	Winner	Score	Runner-up	Notes
Edinburgh Football Association Cup				
1875–76	3rd Edinburgh Rifle Volunteers	6–0	Edinburgh Thistle	Third Edinburgh Rifle Volunteers win the first 'Edinburgh Cup'
1876–77	Edinburgh Thistle	w/o	3rd Edinburgh Rifle Volunteers	Thistle won the Cup after Third Edinburgh Rifle Volunteers failed to show up.
1877–78	Heart of Midlothian	3–2	Hibernian	After 4th replay
1878–79	Hibernian	2–0	Heart of Midlothian	After replay
1879–80	Hibernian	5–0	Dunfermline	Match was replayed after Dunfermline protested the result of the first game (6–3 to Hibernian).
1880–81	Hibernian	1–0	St Bernard's	After replay; Hibernian won the Cup outright and the competition was renamed.
Edinburgh Shield				
1881–82	Hibernian	4–2	St Bernard's	
1882–83	Edinburgh University	w/o	Hibernian	The final was scratched and University were awarded the Shield after Hibernian could not raise a team for the appointed date due to player illness.
1883–84	Hibernian	7–0	St Bernard's	
1884–85	Hibernian	3–2	Edinburgh University	
1885–86	Hibernian	4–1	St Bernard's	
1886–87	Hibernian	3–0	Heart of Midlothian	Hibernian won the Edinburgh and Scottish Cup double.
1887–88	Mossend Swifts	5–3	Hibernian	
1888–89	Heart of Midlothian	5–2	Leith Athletic	
East of Scotland Shield				
1889–90	Heart of Midlothian	2–0	Leith Athletic	
1890–91	Heart of Midlothian	3–0	Armadale	
1891–92	Heart of Midlothian	2–0	St Bernard's	
1892–93	Heart of Midlothian	3–1	St Bernard's	
1893–94	Heart of Midlothian	4–2	Leith Athletic	The 1st round result between Heart of Midlothian and Hibernian was disputed.
1894–95	Bo'ness	4-0	Adventurers	
1895–96	Mossend	4-1	Polton Vale	After protested 1st game
1896–97	St Bernard's	3-2	Cowdenbeath	After replay
1897–98	Heart of Midlothian	2–0	Leith Athletic	After replay
1898–99	Heart of Midlothian	1–0	Hibernian	
1899–1900	Hibernian	3–0	Heart of Midlothian	
1900–01	Leith Athletic	3–2	Heart of Midlothian	
1901–02	Heart of Midlothian	2–1	Hibernian	
1902–03	Hibernian	4–3	Leith Athletic	
1903–04	Heart of Midlothian	7–2	St Bernard's	
1904–05	Hibernian	1–0	Heart of Midlothian	After 2nd replay
1905–06	Heart of Midlothian	2–1	Hibernian	After replay; Hibernian had beaten Heart of Midlothian at the first attempt but the match was declared null and void because Hibernian fielded an ineligible player.
1906–07	Heart of Midlothian	1–0	Leith Athletic	
1907–08	Hibernian	2–1	Leith Athletic	
1908–09	Hibernian	1–0	Heart of Midlothian	After replay
1909–10	Heart of Midlothian	1–1	St Bernard's	Heart of Midlothian won 11–2 on corner kicks.
1910–11	Hibernian	3–0	Leith Athletic	After replay
1911–12	Hibernian	2–0	St Bernard's	
1912–13	Hibernian	3–2	St Bernard's	
1913–14	Heart of Midlothian	1–0	Hibernian	
1914–15	Heart of Midlothian	1–0	Hibernian	
1915–17				No competition due to World War I.
1917–18	Hibernian	5 – 1 agg	Heart of Midlothian	Competition played over two matches between Hibernian and Heart of Midlothian. Hibernian won 4–0 at Easter Road and the match at Tynecastle was drawn 1–1.
1918–19	Heart of Midlothian	3 – 1 agg	Hibernian	Competition played over two matches between Hibernian and Heart of Midlothian. Heart of Midlothian won the first game 2–1 at Tynecastle and the second game 1–0, also at Tynecastle.
1919–20	Heart of Midlothian	3–1	Hibernian	After replay
1920–21	Hibernian	1–0	Heart of Midlothian	
1921–22	Hibernian	3–2	St Bernard's	
1922–23	Hibernian	2–1	Heart of Midlothian	After replay
1923–24	Hibernian	2–1	Heart of Midlothian	After replay
1924–25	Hibernian	3–0	Leith Athletic	
1925–26	Hibernian	2–1	Heart of Midlothian	
1926–27	Heart of Midlothian	5–1	Hibernian	
1927–28	Hibernian	2–1	Heart of Midlothian	After replay
1928–29	Hibernian	3–2	Heart of Midlothian	
1929–30	Heart of Midlothian	1–1	Hibernian	After replay. Heart of Midlothian won 9–5 on corner kicks.
1930–31	Heart of Midlothian	5–4	Hibernian	
1931–32	Heart of Midlothian	5–1	St Bernard's	
1932–33	Heart of Midlothian	4–0	Hibernian	
1933–34	Heart of Midlothian	4–0	Hibernian	
1934–35	Hibernian	4–2	Heart of Midlothian	
1935–36	Heart of Midlothian	3–1	St Bernard's	After replay
1936–37	Heart of Midlothian	6–2	Hibernian	
1937–38	Hibernian	4–0	Heart of Midlothian	
1938–39	Hibernian	3–1	Heart of Midlothian	
1939–40	Heart of Midlothian	3–2	Hibernian	
1940–41	No competition held			Heart of Midlothian withdrew.
1941–42	Heart of Midlothian	3–2	Hibernian	
1942–43	Hibernian	3–2	Heart of Midlothian	After replay
1943–44	Heart of Midlothian	2–1	Hibernian	
1944–45	Hibernian	3–1	Heart of Midlothian	
1945–46	Heart of Midlothian	3–2	Hiberniano	
1946–47	Hibernian	2–1	Heart of Midlothian	
1947–48	Hibernian	3–0	Heart of Midlothian	
1948–49	Hibernian	2–1	Heart of Midlothian	Final played on Tue 15 May 1951 Hibernian 2 Hearts 1
1949–50	Competition was uncompleted			Final not played.
1950–51	No competition held			
1951–52	Hibernian	3–0	Heart of Midlothian	
1952–53	Hibernian	4–2	Heart of Midlothian	
1953–54	Heart of Midlothian	1–0	Hibernian	
1954–55	Heart of Midlothian	4–3	Hibernian	
1955–56	Heart of Midlothian	2–1	Hibernian	
1956–57	Hibernian	2–1	Heart of Midlothian	
1957–58	Heart of Midlothian	3–0	Hibernian	
1958–59	Hibernian	2–0	Heart of Midlothian	
1959–60	Hibernian	3–2	Heart of Midlothian	
1960–61	Hibernian	4–2	Heart of Midlothian	
1961–62	Heart of Midlothian	3–1	Hibernian	
1962–63	Hibernian	2–0	Heart of Midlothian	
1963–64	Heart of Midlothian	3–0	Hibernian	
1964–65	Heart of Midlothian	3–1	Hibernian	
1965–66	Heart of Midlothian	4–2	Hibernian	
1966–67	Hibernian	2–1	Heart of Midlothian	
1967–68	Hibernian	1–0	Heart of Midlothian	After replay
1968–69	Heart of Midlothian	2–1	Hibernian	
1969–70	Heart of Midlothian	3–2	Hibernian	
1970–71	Hibernian	1–0	Heart of Midlothian	
1971–72	Competition was uncompleted			Final not played.
1972–73	Heart of Midlothian	2-1	Berwick Rangers	
1973–74	Heart of Midlothian	3–0	Berwick Rangers	Hibernian did not enter.
1974–75	Heart of Midlothian	2–1	Hibernian	
1975–76	Heart of Midlothian	8–0	Meadowbank Thistle	Hibernian did not enter.
1976–77	Hibernian	1–0	Heart of Midlothian	
1977–78	Hibernian	4–0	Meadowbank Thistle	
1978–79	No competition held			
1979–80	Hibernian	2–2	Heart of Midlothian	Hibernian won on penalties.
1980–81	Berwick Rangers	6 – 1	Meadowbank Thistle	
1981–82	Heart of Midlothian	5–0	Meadowbank Thistle	Played at Tynecastle on 20 January 1982. Meadowbank beat Berwick on penalties in the semi-final after a 1-1 draw.
1982–83	Hibernian	2–2	Berwick Rangers	Hibernian won on penalties.
1983–84	Berwick Rangers	2–1	Meadowbank Thistle	Final played at Shielfield Park on 15 May 1984. Meadowbank beat Hibernian on penalties in the semi-final.
1984–85	No competition held			
1985–86	Heart of Midlothian	2–1	Hibernian	
1986–87	Hibernian	2–0	Heart of Midlothian	
1987–88	Heart of Midlothian	5–1	Hibernian	
1988–89	Heart of Midlothian	3–3	Hibernian	Heart of Midlothian won 4–3 on penalties
1989–90	Hibernian	0–0	Heart of Midlothian	Hibernian won on 9-8 penalties
1990–2000	?	?	?	Played intermittently between Hibs and Hearts at reserve, youth or schoolboy level: results of some matches unknown.
1990–91	Hibernian	3–0	Heart of Midlothian	U21s
1991–92	Hibernian	0–0	Heart of Midlothian	Reserve XIs Hibernian won 5-3 on penalties
1992–93	Heart of Midlothian	1–0	Hibernian	Reserve XIs
1993–94	Hibs	2-1	Hearts	Reserve XIs Final played on 4 May 1994 result unknown
1994–95	Heart of Midlothian	1–1	Hibernian	Reserve XIs Heart of Midlothian won on penalties
1995–96	Hibernian	1–0	Heart of Midlothian	Reserve XIs
1997–98	Heart of Midlothian	0–0	Hibernian	Reserve XIs Heart of Midlothian won 3-1 on penalties
2001–02	Heart of Midlothian	3-1	Hibernian	U21s played at Easter Road crowd 595. First year of revived competition, now played as a one-off match between de facto youth teams of Hibs and Hearts. Annually, the clubs reach an informal gentlemen's agreement regarding the specific age conditions for the fixture.
2002–03	Heart of Midlothian	2-0	Hibernian	U21s played at Easter Road crowd 200
2003–04	Hibernian	3–1	Heart of Midlothian	Played in Season 2004-05 (3rd Aug 2004)
2004–05	Hibernian	3–1	Heart of Midlothian	
2005–06	Hibernian	4–2	Heart of Midlothian	
2006–07	Hibernian	3–2	Heart of Midlothian	The match was held-over due to scheduling issues, and ultimately played toward the end of the 2007–08 season.
2007–08				No competition. After being again held-over (as with playing the 2006–07 edition during 2007–08), the Shield was put back on schedule by declaring the 2007–08 edition unplayed – and holding the 2008–09 edition in its correct season.
2008–09	Hibernian	1–1	Heart of Midlothian	Hibernian won on 8-7 penalties
2009–10	Hibernian	2–1	Heart of Midlothian	Match played between under-17 age group teams.
2010–11	Hibernian	2–1	Heart of Midlothian	
2011–12	Hibernian	2–2	Heart of Midlothian	Hibernian won 5–4 on penalties
2012–13	Hibernian	3–0	Heart of Midlothian	
2013–14	Hibernian	2–0	Heart of Midlothian	
2014–15	Heart of Midlothian	3–1	Hibernian	Played in October 2015.
2015–16	Heart of Midlothian	2–1	Hibernian	

== List of winners ==
As senior competition (to 1990):

- Heart of Midlothian: 60 wins
- Hibernian: 60 wins
- Berwick Rangers: 2 wins
- Mossend Swifts: 2 wins
- 3rd E.R.V.: 1 win
- St Bernard's: 1 win
- Leith Athletic: 1 win
- Bo'ness: 1 win
- Edinburgh University: 1 win
- Edinburgh Thistle: 1 win

As Non First XI competition (since 1990, Mixture of Reserve, U21, U18 and Youth results. Record incomplete):

- Hibernian youths: 13 wins (+47= 60 wins)
- Heart of Midlothian youths: 8 wins (+52= 60 wins)

== See also ==
- Glasgow Cup
- Rosebery Charity Cup
- Wilson Cup (football)
