= 1981–82 Rangers F.C. season =

Rangers
1981–82 season
- Chairman: Rae Simpson
- Manager: John Greig
- Ground: Ibrox Park
- Scottish Premier Division: 3rd P36 W16 D11 L9 F57 A45 Pts43
- Scottish Cup: Runners-up
- League Cup: Winners
- Cup Winners' Cup: First round
- Glasgow Cup: Runners-up
- Top goalscorer: League: John MacDonald (14); All: John MacDonald (22)

The 1981–82 season was the 102nd season of competitive football by Rangers.

== Overview ==
Rangers played a total of 55 competitive matches during the 1981–82 season. Greig's fourth season in charge ended yet again without the league championship. Rangers finished third, twelve points behind Old Firm rivals Celtic who were champions. There was an apparent lack of ambition at the club due a lack of transfer funds which were being directed towards the redevelopment of Ibrox Park. There was the surprise signing of Northern Ireland international John McClelland from Mansfield Town. The Ulsterman proved to be a shrewd acquisition and later became the club captain. European participation was halted by Dukla Prague who soundly beat the team 3–0 in Prague and a 2–1 second leg win for Rangers was not enough for the team to progress. The domestic cup competitions provided successful ground as Rangers reached both finals. The team lost the 1982 Scottish Cup Final 4–1 to Aberdeen despite taking the lead in the match. The game went into extra-time where the Dons added a trio. Rangers did win the 1981 Scottish League Cup Final by defeating Dundee United 2–1 with goals from Davie Cooper and Ian Redford.

== Results ==
All results are written with Rangers' score first.

=== Scottish Premier Division ===
Date	Opponent	Venue	Result	Attendance	Scorers
29 August 1981	Partick Thistle	A	1–0	19,159	McLean (pen)
5 September 1981	Hibernian	H	2–2	23,500	Bett, Cooper
12 September 1981	St Mirren	A	1–1	15,652	MacDonald
19 September 1981	Celtic	H	0–2	40,900	
3 October 1981	Airdrieonians	H	4–1	12,500	Bett (2), Johnstone, Jardine
10 October 1981	Aberdeen	H	0–0	30,000	
17 October 1981	Dundee	A	3–2	11,956	MacDonald (2), Russell
24 October 1981	Morton	H	1–1	21,000	Russell
31 October 1981	Partick Thistle	H	0–2	17,000	
7 November 1981	Hibernian	A	2–1	14,685	Bett (2, 1 pen)
11 November 1981	Dundee United	A	0–2	16,138	
14 November 1981	St Mirren	H	4–1	18,000	Johnstone, Russell, Bett (pen), Cooper
21 November 1981	Celtic	A	3–3	48,600	Dalziel, Bett, MacDonald
5 December 1981	Airdrieonians	A	2–2	13,750	MacDonald, Russell
19 December 1981	Dundee	H	2–1	11,000	Bett, McAdam
9 January 1982	Celtic	H	1–0	44,000	Bett (pen)
16 January 1982	Dundee United	H	2–0	23,000	Dalziel, Cooper
30 January 1982	Hibernian	H	1–1	20,000	Johnstone
17 February 1982	Partick Thistle	A	0–2	6,513	
20 February 1982	Dundee United	A	1–1	12,945	Dawson
27 February 1982	Morton	H	3–0	10,200	MacDonald, Dalziel, MacKay
10 March 1982	St Mirren	A	3–2	8,633	Johnstone (2), Bett (pen)
13 March 1982	Aberdeen	H	1–3	25,000	Johnstone
17 March 1982	Morton	A	0–0	4,579	
20 March 1982	Partick Thistle	H	4–1	13,000	Johnstone, Russell, Bett (pen), MacDonald
27 March 1982	Hibernian	A	0–0	12,390	
31 March 1982	Airdrieonians	H	1–0	8,000	MacDonald
10 April 1982	Celtic	A	1–2	49,144	Johnstone
14 April 1982	Dundee	A	1–3	7,975	MacDonald
17 April 1982	Airdrieonians	A	1–0	10,000	MacDonald
21 April 1982	Aberdeen	A	1–3	15,700	Johnstone
24 April 1982	Dundee United	H	1–1	12,000	MacDonald
1 May 1982	Morton	A	3–1	6,500	MacDonald (2), Russell
5 May 1982	St Mirren	H	3–0	6,000	MacDonald, McAdam, Redford
8 May 1982	Dundee	H	4–0	8,500	Dalziel (3), Redford
15 May 1982	Aberdeen	A	0–4	16,200	

=== Cup Winners' Cup ===
Date	Round	Opponent	Venue	Result	Attendance	Scorers
16 September 1981	R1	FK Příbram	A	0–3	22,500	
30 September 1981	R1	FK Příbram	H	2–1	35,000	Bett, MacDonald

=== Scottish Cup ===
Date	Round	Opponent	Venue	Result	Attendance	Scorers
6 February 1982	R3	Albion Rovers	H	6–2	9,200	Johnstone, MacDonald, Russell, McAdam, McPherson (pen), Redford
13 February 1982	R4	Dumbarton	H	4–0	15,000	Jardine (2), McAdam, Johnstone
6 March 1982	QF	Dundee	H	2–0	16,500	Johnstone, McAdam
3 April 1982	SF	Forfar Athletic	N	0–0	15,878	
6 April 1982	SF R	Forfar Athletic	N	3–1	11,864	Johnstone, Bett, Cooper
22 May 1982	F	Aberdeen	N	1–4	53,788	MacDonald

=== League Cup ===
Date	Round	Opponent	Venue	Result	Attendance	Scorers
8 August 1981	SR	Morton	A	1–1	11,500	McAdam
12 August 1981	SR	Dundee	H	4–1	13,500	McAdam, Johnstone, Miller, MacDonald
15 August 1981	SR	Raith Rovers	H	8–1	18,000	Redford (4), Russell (2), Jardine, McAdam
19 August 1981	SR	Dundee	A	2–1	9,124	Stevens, McGeachie (og)
22 August 1981	SR	Morton	H	1–0	30,000	Johnstone
26 August 1981	SR	Raith Rovers	A	3–1	6,000	Redford, Johnstone, MacDonald
2 September 1981	QF	Brechin City	A	4–0	7,000	Russell, Jackson, McLean (pen), Redford
23 September 1981	QF	Brechin City	H	1–0	5,000	MacDonald
7 October 1981	SF	St Mirren	A	2–2	14,058	McAdam, MacDonald
28 October 1981	SF	St Mirren	H	2–1	28,000	Bett (pen), MacDonald
28 November 1981	F	Dundee United	N	2–1	53,777	Cooper, Redford

=== Glasgow Cup ===
Date	Round	Opponent	Venue	Result	Attendance	Scorers
12 December 1981	SF	Clyde	H	2–0	4,500	Redford (2)
13 May 1982	F	Celtic	H	1–2	5,000	Garner (own goal)

== Appearances ==
Player	Position	Appearances	Goals
(Scotland) Peter McCloy	GK	13	0
(Scotland) Jim Stewart	GK	42	0
(Scotland) Sandy Jardine	DF	52	4
(Scotland) Alex Miller	DF	27	1
(England) Gregor Stevens	DF	22	1
(Scotland) Tom Forsyth	DF	21	0
(Scotland) Jim Bett	MF	51	14
(Scotland) Davie Cooper	MF	47	5
(Scotland) Bobby Russell	MF	49	10
(Scotland) Colin McAdam	FW	36	9
(Scotland) Derek Johnstone	FW	42	16
(Scotland) Tommy McLean	MF	12	2
(Scotland) Ian Redford	MF	50	10
(Scotland) John MacDonald	FW	53	22
(Scotland) Ally Dawson	DF	38	1
(Scotland) Willie Johnston	MF	17	0
(Northern Ireland) John McClelland	DF	22	0
(Scotland) Colin Jackson	DF	32	1
(Scotland) Billy MacKay	MF	10	1
(Scotland) Kenny Black	MF	10	0
(Scotland) Gordon Dalziel	MF	24	6
(Scotland) Billy Davies	MF	8	0
(Scotland) Kenny Lyall	MF	4	0
(Scotland) Doug Robertson	FW	3	0
(Scotland) Jim McIntyre	MF	1	0
(Scotland) Dave McPherson	DF	2	1

== League table ==
Pos	Team	Pld	W	D	L	GF	GA	GD	Pts	Qualification or relegation
1	Celtic (C)	36	24	7	5	79	33	+46	55	Qualification for the European Cup first round
2	Aberdeen	36	23	7	6	71	29	+42	53	Qualification for the Cup Winners' Cup first round
3	Rangers	36	16	11	9	57	45	+12	43	Qualification for the UEFA Cup first round
4	Dundee United	36	15	10	11	61	38	+23	40	Qualification for the UEFA Cup first round
5	St Mirren	36	14	9	13	49	52	−3	37	

Source: Statto
Rules for classification: 1) points; 2) goal difference; 3) number of goals scored.
(C) Champions

== See also ==
- 1981–82 in Scottish football
- 1981–82 Scottish Cup
- 1981–82 Scottish League Cup
- 1981–82 European Cup Winners' Cup
