= 1981 Scottish League Cup final =

- Event: 1981–82 Scottish League Cup
| Dundee United | Rangers |
| 1 | 2 |
- Date: 28 November 1981
- Venue: Hampden Park, Glasgow
- Referee: Eddie Pringle (Edinburgh)
- Attendance: 53,777

The 1981 Scottish League Cup final was played on 28 November 1981, at Hampden Park in Glasgow and was the final of the 36th Scottish League Cup competition. The final was contested by Dundee United and Rangers. Rangers won the match 2–1 thanks to goals by Davie Cooper and Ian Redford.

== Match details ==
28 November 1981

| Dundee United | 1–2 | Rangers |
|---|---|---|
| Milne 47' | | Cooper 74'; Redford 88' |

Hampden Park, Glasgow
Attendance: 53,777

DUNDEE UNITED:
| GK | 1 | Hamish McAlpine |
| DF | 2 | John Holt |
| DF | 3 | Derek Stark |
| DF | 4 | David Narey |
| DF | 5 | Paul Hegarty (c) |
| MF | 6 | Iain Phillip |
| MF | 7 | Eamonn Bannon |
| MF | 8 | Ralph Milne |
| MF | 9 | Billy Kirkwood |
| FW | 10 | Paul Sturrock |
| FW | 11 | Davie Dodds |
Substitutes:
| ? | ? |
Manager:
Jim McLean

RANGERS:
| GK | 1 | Jim Stewart |
| DF | 2 | Sandy Jardine (c) |
| DF | 3 | Alex Miller |
| DF | 4 | Gregor Stevens |
| DF | 5 | Colin Jackson |
| MF | 6 | Jim Bett |
| MF | 7 | Davie Cooper |
| MF | 8 | Derek Johnstone |
| MF | 9 | Bobby Russell |
| FW | 10 | John MacDonald |
| FW | 11 | Gordon Dalziel | (substituted off) ?' |
Substitutes:
| MF | 12 | Ian Redford | (substituted on) ?' |
Manager:
John Greig

== See also ==
Played between same clubs:

- 1984 Scottish League Cup final (October)
- 2008 Scottish League Cup final
