= 1981 Scottish Cup final =

1981 Scottish Cup Final
- Event: 1980–81 Scottish Cup
Rangers	Dundee United
0	0
Rangers	Dundee United
- Date: 9 May 1981
- Venue: Hampden Park, Glasgow
- Referee: Ian Foote
- Attendance: 53,346

Replay
Rangers	Dundee United
4	1
- Date: 12 May 1981
- Venue: Hampden Park, Glasgow
- Referee: Ian Foote
- Attendance: 43,099

The 1981 Scottish Cup Final was played on 9 May 1981 at Hampden Park in Glasgow and was the final of the 96th Scottish Cup. Rangers and Dundee United contested the match. The first match, saw Dundee United start strongly, but fail to score. Rangers had the chance to win the match when they won a penalty at the end of normal time, but Ian Redford's effort was saved by Hamish McAlpine. After a period of extra time the match finished goalless. The replay took place on 12 May 1981, Rangers ran out easy winners, beating Dundee United, whose players appeared not to have recovered from the first match, 4–1.

This was the last Final contested with a replay; beginning in the subsequent year, extra time and penalty shootouts were used to determine the winner on the same day.

== Match details ==
9 May 1981

Rangers	0 – 0	Dundee United
	Report (page 19)

Hampden Park, Glasgow
Attendance: 53,346
Referee: Ian Foote

=== Teams ===
RANGERS:
GK	(Scotland) Jim Stewart
DF	(Scotland) Sandy Jardine
DF	(Scotland) Gregor Stevens
DF	(Scotland) Tom Forsyth
DF	(Scotland) Ally Dawson (c)
MF	(Scotland) Tommy McLean
MF	(Scotland) Bobby Russell
MF	(Scotland) Jim Bett
MF	(Scotland) Ian Redford
MF	(Scotland) Willie Johnston	(substituted off) ?'
FW	(Scotland) Colin McAdam	(substituted off) ?'
Substitutes:
MF	(Scotland) Davie Cooper	(substituted on) ?'
FW	(Scotland) John MacDonald	(substituted on) ?'
Manager:
(Scotland) John Greig

DUNDEE UNITED:
GK	(Scotland) Hamish McAlpine
DF	(Scotland) John Holt
DF	(Scotland) Paul Hegarty (c)
DF	(Scotland) David Narey
DF	(Scotland) Frank Kopel
MF	(Scotland) Eamonn Bannon
MF	(Scotland) Billy Kirkwood
MF	(Scotland) Iain Phillip	(substituted off) ?'
MF	(Scotland) Ralph Milne	(substituted off) ?'
FW	(Scotland) Davie Dodds
FW	(Scotland) Paul Sturrock
Substitutes:
DF	(Scotland) Derek Stark	(substituted on) ?'
FW	(Scotland) Willie Pettigrew	(substituted on) ?'
Manager:
(Scotland) Jim McLean

=== Replay ===
12 May 1981

Rangers	4 – 1	Dundee United
Cooper 10'; Russell 20'; MacDonald 28', 77'	Report (page 24)	Davie Dodds 22'

Hampden Park, Glasgow
Attendance: 43,099
Referee: Ian Foote

==== Teams ====
RANGERS:
GK	(Scotland) Jim Stewart
DF	(Scotland) Sandy Jardine
DF	(Scotland) Gregor Stevens
DF	(Scotland) Tom Forsyth
DF	(Scotland) Ally Dawson (c)
MF	(Scotland) Bobby Russell
MF	(Scotland) Ian Redford
MF	(Scotland) Jim Bett
MF	(Scotland) Davie Cooper
MF	(Scotland) Derek Johnstone
FW	(Scotland) John MacDonald
Substitutes:
MF	(Scotland) Tommy McLean (unused)
FW	(Scotland) Colin McAdam (unused)
Manager:
(Scotland) John Greig

DUNDEE UNITED:
GK	(Scotland) Hamish McAlpine
DF	(Scotland) John Holt
DF	(Scotland) Paul Hegarty (c)
DF	(Scotland) David Narey
DF	(Scotland) Frank Kopel
MF	(Scotland) Eamonn Bannon
MF	(Scotland) Billy Kirkwood
MF	(Scotland) Iain Phillip	(substituted off) ?'
MF	(Scotland) Ralph Milne
FW	(Scotland) Davie Dodds
FW	(Scotland) Paul Sturrock
Substitutes:
DF	(Scotland) Derek Stark	(substituted on) ?'
FW	(Scotland) Willie Pettigrew
Manager:
(Scotland) Jim McLean
