= 1982 Scottish Cup final =

1982 Scottish Cup Final
- Event: 1981–82 Scottish Cup
Aberdeen	Rangers
4	1
- After extra time
- Date: 22 May 1982
- Venue: Hampden Park, Glasgow
- Referee: Brian McGinlay
- Attendance: 53,788

The 1982 Scottish Cup Final was played on 22 May 1982 at Hampden Park in Glasgow. Aberdeen and Rangers contested the match; the final of the 107th Scottish Cup. Aberdeen won 4–1, after extra time goals from McGhee, Strachan and Cooper. This marked the first cup win for a team outside the Old Firm for over ten years.

== Summary ==
John MacDonald opened the scoring for Rangers after 15 minutes with a diving header from six yards out after a cross from the right hand side. Aberdeen equalized in the 32nd minute when Alex McLeish curled the ball into the net with his right foot from the left edge of the penalty area after the ball had been cleared from a corner. The match went to extra-time and in the 3rd minute Mark McGhee scored with a header after a cross from the right. Gordon Strachan put Aberdeen 3-1 in front with a tap into an empty net after a cross from the left. Neale Cooper got the fourth goal for Aberdeen when he ran clear in on goal and despite a challenge from the Rangers goalkeeper Jim Stewart the ball broke free with Cooper shooting into the empty net.

== Road to Hampden Park ==
Home teams listed first.

=== Aberdeen ===
Third Round: Motherwell 0-1 Aberdeen

Second Round: Aberdeen 1-0 Celtic

Quarter Final: Aberdeen 4-2 Kilmarnock

Semi-final: Aberdeen 1-1 St Mirren (at Celtic Park, Glasgow)

Replay: Aberdeen 3-2 St Mirren (at Dens Park, Dundee)

=== Rangers ===
Third Round: Rangers 6-2 Albion Rovers

Fourth Round: Rangers 4–0 Dumbarton

Quarter Final: Rangers 2-0 Dundee

Semi-final: Rangers 0-0 Forfar Athletic (at Hampden Park, Glasgow)

Replay: Rangers 3-1 Forfar Athletic (at Hampden Park, Glasgow)

== Match details ==
22 May 1982

Aberdeen	4 – 1 (a.e.t.)	Rangers
McLeish 32'; McGhee 93'; Strachan 103'; Cooper 110'	Report	MacDonald 15'

Hampden Park, Glasgow
Attendance: 53,788
Referee: Brian McGinlay

Aberdeen	Rangers

ABERDEEN:
GK	1	(Scotland) Jim Leighton
DF	2	(Scotland) Stuart Kennedy
DF	5	(Scotland) Alex McLeish
DF	6	(Scotland) Willie Miller (c)
DF	3	(Scotland) Doug Rougvie
MF	7	(Scotland) Gordon Strachan
MF	8	(Scotland) Neale Cooper
MF	10	(Scotland) Neil Simpson
MF	4	(Scotland) John McMaster	(substituted off) ?'
FW	11	(Scotland) John Hewitt		(substituted off) ?'
FW	9	(Scotland) Mark McGhee
Substitutes:
MF	12	(Scotland) Dougie Bell	(substituted on) ?'
FW	14	(Scotland) Eric Black		(substituted on) ?'
Manager:
(Scotland) Alex Ferguson

RANGERS:
GK	1	(Scotland) Jim Stewart
DF	2	(Scotland) Sandy Jardine (c)	(substituted off) ?'
DF	4	(Northern Ireland) John McClelland
DF	5	(Scotland) Colin Jackson
DF	3	(Scotland) Ally Dawson
MF	8	(Scotland) Bobby Russell
MF	10	(Scotland) Alex Miller
MF	6	(Scotland) Jim Bett
MF	7	(Scotland) Davie Cooper
FW	9	(Scotland) Gordon Dalziel		(substituted off) ?'
FW	11	(Scotland) John MacDonald
Substitutes:
FW	12	(Scotland) Colin McAdam	(substituted on) ?'
MF	14	(Scotland) Tommy McLean		(substituted on) ?'
Manager:
(Scotland) John Greig

== See also ==
- Aberdeen F.C.–Rangers F.C. rivalry
