= David Narey =

Scottish footballer

David Narey MBE
Personal information
- Full name: David Narey
- Date of birth: 12 June 1956 (age 70)
- Place of birth: Dundee, Scotland
- Height: 6 ft 0 in (1.83 m)
- Position: Central defender

Youth career
- St Columba's BC
- 1972–1973: Dundee United

Senior career*
Years	Team	Apps	(Gls)
1973–1994	Dundee United	612	(22)
1994–1995	Raith Rovers	21	(1)
Total		633	(23)

International career
1977–1989	Scotland	35	(1)
1978	Scottish Football League XI	1	(0)
- * Club domestic league appearances and goals

David Narey MBE (born 12 June 1956) is a former Scottish international footballer who played as a defender. Narey spent 21 years with Dundee United, winning the Scottish championship once and the league cup twice. He also played in numerous cup runs in Europe, including playing in the 1983–84 European Cup semi final and the 1987 UEFA Cup final. Although best remembered as a central defender, he occasionally played in midfield. After leaving United, he won the 1994–95 Scottish League Cup with Raith Rovers.

He collected 35 full caps for Scotland including playing in two World Cups. Narey opened the scoring for Scotland against Brazil with a 20-yard drive in the 1982 FIFA World Cup. He is a Scottish Football Hall of Fame inductee as he is also at Dundee United.

== Early life ==
Narey was born and brought up in Dundee and attended St John's Roman Catholic High School. He played football for St Columba's Boys Club and signed schoolboy forms with Dundee United in January 1972.

== Playing career ==
=== Club ===
Narey signed professionally with Dundee United in 1973 and made his senior debut in a Scottish Football League match against Falkirk on 21 November that year, playing as an attacking midfielder.

Narey won three trophies in his career with Dundee United, the Scottish League Cup in 1979 and again in 1980 and the Scottish Football League Premier Division title in 1983. He also captained United when they played in the 1987 UEFA Cup final against IFK Gothenburg, which they lost 1–0 in the first leg in Sweden and drew the return leg at Tannadice 1–1, for a 2–1 defeat on aggregate.

Narey played in four Scottish Cup finals (as well as the 1981 Scottish Cup final replay) while with United, but on each occasion the side failed to win the trophy.

Upon leaving United, Narey joined Raith Rovers, who were playing in the Scottish Football League First Division. He was part of the Raith team that won promotion to the Premier Division as First Division champions. He also played in the Raith team that defeated Celtic in the 1994 Scottish League Cup final, winning the Man-of-the-Match award for his performance in the game.

=== International ===
Narey made his international debut for Scotland against Sweden in April 1977, becoming the first Dundee United player to represent Scotland at full international level. He played in both the 1982 and 1986 FIFA World Cups and scored his only international goal during the 1982 tournament, a long range shot in a 4–1 defeat against Brazil in the first round. Television pundit Jimmy Hill upset Scottish fans by describing the goal as a "toe poke". By contrast The Glasgow Herald correspondent at the match, Jim Reynolds, described Narey's goal as "a wonderful right-foot shot which no goalkeeper in the world would have stopped." In 2018 the BBC named the goal as number 16 in their 50 Great World Cup moments. Narey made the last of his 35 appearances for Scotland in 1989.

== After football ==
David Narey was one of the first inductees of the Dundee United Hall of Fame in January 2008. He was also inducted into the Scottish Football Hall of Fame in November 2010.

== Career statistics ==
=== Club ===
Club	Season	League		Cup		Lg Cup		Other		Total	
Club	Season	Apps	Goals	Apps	Goals	Apps	Goals	Apps	Goals	Apps	Goals
Dundee United	1973–74	12	0	-		-		-		12	0
Dundee United	1974–75	31	6	3	0	6	0	4	1	44	7
Dundee United	1975–76	33	0	1	0	6	1	3	2	43	3
Dundee United	1976–77	32	2	1	0	6	0	-		39	2
Dundee United	1977–78	35	0	4	0	8	1	2	0	49	1
Dundee United	1978–79	36	5	1	0	2	0	2	0	41	5
Dundee United	1979–80	35	1	1	0	9	0	4	0	49	1
Dundee United	1980–81	32	0	7	1	11	1	4	0	54	2
Dundee United	1981–82	34	1	5	0	11	0	8	2	58	3
Dundee United	1982–83	36	5	1	0	10	3	8	1	55	9
Dundee United	1983–84	34	1	4	0	9	0	7	0	54	1
Dundee United	1984–85	29	1	6	0	5	0	6	0	46	1
Dundee United	1985–86	35	0	5	0	5	0	6	0	51	0
Dundee United	1986–87	33	0	7	0	4	0	10	0	54	0
Dundee United	1987–88	39	0	9	0	3	0	3	0	54	0
Dundee United	1988–89	34	0	6	0	4	0	3	0	47	0
Dundee United	1989–90	31	0	5	0	2	0	3	0	41	0
Dundee United	1990–91	4	0	-		-		2	0	6	0
Dundee United	1991–92	25	0	-		2	0	-		27	0
Dundee United	1992–93	28	0	1	0	2	0	-		31	0
Dundee United	1993–94	6	0	2	0	3	0	1	0	12	0
Dundee United	Total	612	22	69	1	108	6	76	6	865	35
Raith Rovers	1994–95	21	1	N/A		N/A		-		21	1
Raith Rovers	Total	21	1	0	0	0	0	0	0	21	1
Career total		633	23	69	1	108	6	76	6	886	36

=== International ===
Scotland
Year	Apps	Goals
1977	1	0
1978	1	0
1979	2	0
1980	4	0
1981	2	0
1982	9	1
1983	6	0
1984	0	0
1985	0	0
1986	7	0
1987	1	0
1988	1	0
1989	1	0
Total	35	1

Scores and results list Scotland's goal tally first.

#	Date	Venue	Opponent	Score	Result	Competition
1.	18 June 1982	Estadio Benito Villamarín, Seville	Brazil	1–0	1–4	1982 FIFA World Cup

== Honours ==
Dundee United

- Scottish Premier Division: 1982–83
- Scottish League Cup: 1979–80, 1980–81; runner-up: 1981–82, 1984–85
- Scottish Cup runner-up: 1980–81, 1984–85, 1986–87, 1987–88
- UEFA Cup runner-up: 1986–87

Raith Rovers

- Scottish League Cup: 1994–95
- Scottish First Division: 1994–95

== See also ==
- List of footballers in Scotland by number of league appearances (500+)
