= 1984 Scottish League Cup final =

Two Scottish League Cup finals were played in 1984:

- 1984 Scottish League Cup final (March), final of the 1983–84 Scottish League Cup, Rangers 3–2 Celtic
- 1984 Scottish League Cup final (October), final of the 1984–85 Scottish League Cup, Rangers 1–0 Dundee United
