= Sandy Jardine =

Scottish professional footballer

Personal information
- Full name: William Pullar Jardine
- Date of birth: 31 December 1948
- Place of birth: Edinburgh, Scotland
- Date of death: 24 April 2014 (aged 65)
- Place of death: Edinburgh, Scotland
- Position: Right-back

Youth career
- North Merchiston BC
- United Crossroads BC
- Edinburgh Athletic
- 1964–1966: Rangers

Senior career*
Years	Team	Apps	(Gls)
1966–1982	Rangers	451	(42)
1982–1988	Heart of Midlothian	187	(3)
Total		638	(45)

International career
1970–1979	Scotland	38	(1)
1971–1972	Scotland U23	4	(1)
1972–1973	Scottish League XI	2	(0)

Managerial career
- 1986–1988: Heart of Midlothian
- * Club domestic league appearances and goals

William "Sandy" Pullar Jardine (31 December 1948 – 24 April 2014) was a Scottish professional footballer who played for Rangers, Hearts and represented Scotland. When he retired, he had made over 1,000 career appearances and twice won the Scottish Football Writers Association Player of the Year award.

He won several honours with Rangers, including two domestic trebles in 1976 and 1978, and was part of the Rangers team that won the European Cup Winners' Cup in 1972. He won 38 caps for Scotland and played in the 1974 and 1978 World Cups.

Jardine was also co-manager of Hearts with Alex MacDonald and later worked for Rangers.

Jardine died in April 2014, 18 months after being diagnosed with liver cancer.

== Early life ==
Jardine grew up in Edinburgh in close proximity to Tynecastle Park, the home ground of Hearts who he supported as a youngster. His ability at football shone through at an early age as he earned local and national schoolboy honours with Balgreen Primary and Tynecastle Secondary. As a youth he played for North Merchiston Boys Club, United Crossroads Boys Club and Edinburgh Athletic. He also trained at Hearts' ground.

Although his full name was William Pullar Jardine, he became known as 'Sandy' due to his hair colour.

== Playing career ==
=== Club career ===
==== Rangers ====
Jardine signed for Rangers in 1964. Signed as a midfielder, he spent a couple of years in the reserves before making his debut aged 18 in a 5–1 league win at home to Hearts on 4 February 1967, playing at right-half. This match took place a week after Rangers had been knocked out of the Scottish Cup by Berwick Rangers. He scored his first Rangers goal a few weeks later on 18 March 1967 in a league match against Ayr United. That same season Jardine played in the 1967 European Cup Winners' Cup Final against Bayern Munich, losing 1–0 after extra time.

Jardine played in various defensive positions as he became a regular under manager Davie White, even as a centre-forward, before finally settling as a right full-back at the start of the 1970–71 season under new manager Willie Waddell. He proved a revelation at right-back; a strong player who enjoyed marauding forward, he had an excellent turn of pace which ensured he was rarely caught out of position. The position was where he went on to make the bulk of his 674 appearances for the club.

He won his first major trophy in 1970, Rangers beating Celtic 1–0 in the Scottish League Cup Final. The following season he was an ever-present in the Rangers side which reached the 1972 European Cup Winners' Cup Final, playing in all eight matches en route to the final and scoring the first goal of a 2–0 win over Bayern Munich in the semi-final. Jardine went on to help Rangers win the final, defeating Moscow Dynamo 3–2 at the Nou Camp in Barcelona. Between 27 April 1972 and 30 August 1975, he did not miss a single game for Rangers and played in 171 consecutive matches for them. Further success continued during this time; in 1974–75 he helped Rangers win their first Scottish league title in 11 years and his performances were acknowledged by the Scottish Football Writers' Association, who voted him their Player of the Year. Jardine was a key part of the Rangers sides that won the domestic treble in 1975–76 and 1977–78.

By the early 1980s Rangers were in decline, and 33-year-old Jardine was reluctantly given a free transfer to Hearts in mid-1982 by manager John Greig. The pair were close friends, having both grown up and lived in Edinburgh, and commuted together to train and play for Rangers in their younger days. Greig allowed Jardine to leave due to his long service and his stated wish to end his playing career at the club he supported as a boy.

==== Hearts ====
Jardine signed for Hearts, the club he had supported as a child, in 1982. He joined Hearts at a time when their fortunes were at a low ebb, as they had failed to win promotion from the First Division in the 1981–82 season. Jardine linked up with former Rangers teammate Alex MacDonald, who was now player-manager at the Edinburgh club. Jardine was now also assistant manager, and according to teammate John Robertson he helped to instil higher standards of professionalism at the club. Hearts gained promotion in 1982–83 and became a competitive force in the Premier Division, finishing fifth in their first season back in the top division and qualifying for the UEFA Cup.

Still playing regularly, Jardine was an integral part of the side that almost won the Scottish league championship in 1985–86, finishing second behind Celtic on goal difference. Robertson said that Jardine's contribution to the team was his ability to read the game and to pass the ball out of the defensive area. During the season, he made his 1000th professional appearance^{1} on 16 November 1985 in a league match at home against Rangers. His performances that season saw him win the Scottish Football Writers Association Player of the Year award again, aged 37. Jardine was the second player to win the award more than once (John Greig had been the first) and the first player to win the award with two different clubs.

In November 1986, Jardine was appointed joint manager alongside MacDonald. He continued to feature in the team but by 1987-88 had begun to phase himself out of the side to concentrate on his management duties.

^{1}Includes appearances in friendlies and minor cup competitions such as the Glasgow Cup, Drybrough Cup and the Anglo-Scottish Cup.

=== International career ===
Jardine made his debut appearance for Scotland as a substitute for David Hay on 11 November 1970 in a European Championship qualifying win against Denmark. His next appearance, and first start, came almost a year later in October 1971 in another European Championship qualifying tie, a 2–1 win over Portugal.

By 1974 Jardine had become a regular at right-back in the international side and played in all three matches of the victorious 1974 British Home Championship campaign, during which he scored his only international goal in a 2–0 win over Wales. He had also helped Scotland qualify for the 1974 World Cup finals in West Germany. Jardine played in all three group matches of the tournament, where he and Celtic's Danny McGrain were voted the best pair of fullbacks in the competition.

He continued to play regularly for Scotland throughout the 1970s and made one further appearance in the finals of a major tournament, against Iran during the 1978 FIFA World Cup in Argentina. Jardine made his final Scotland appearance on 19 December 1979, against Belgium in a European Championship qualifier.

Jardine was capped 38 times in total and captained the team on nine occasions.

== Managerial career ==
Jardine joined Heart of Midlothian in July 1982 as a player, but also took on the role of assistant manager under ex-Rangers teammate Alex MacDonald. The club achieved promotion to the Scottish Premier Division in 1983 and three years later came close to winning the title, eventually finishing in second place on goal difference behind Celtic. In November 1986 he was promoted to joint-manager alongside MacDonald.

Hearts could only finish fifth in the league the following season but regained form in 1987–88 and again finished a credible second, ahead of Aberdeen and high-spending Rangers. Poor form at the start of season 1988–89, however, saw Hearts owner Wallace Mercer sack Jardine in November 1988, stating that the experiment of having joint-managers had not delivered the expected results.

== Post-football career ==
Jardine later worked for Rangers in a public relations capacity and then in the retail department as the club's sales and marketing manager. After Rangers entered administration in February 2012, Jardine was placed in joint control of a fans' "fighting fund" to aid the club. Jardine was upset by the imposition of sanctions on Rangers by a Scottish Football Association (SFA) judicial panel in April 2012. He then led a march of Rangers fans to the SFA offices at Hampden Park to deliver a letter protesting against the sanctions. Jardine also said that the Rangers fans would consider taking action against other clubs or governing bodies that they felt had acted against Rangers' interests.

== Personal life ==
On 17 November 2012, Rangers announced that Jardine was being treated for cancer. Jardine died on 24 April 2014, aged 65.

== Legacy ==
On 16 July 2014, Rangers announced that the club would pay a lasting tribute to Jardine by changing the name of the Govan Stand to the Sandy Jardine Stand.

== Career statistics ==
=== Club ===
Club performance			League		Scottish Cup		League Cup		Europe		Total	
Season	Club	League	Apps	Goals	Apps	Goals	Apps	Goals	Apps	Goals	Apps	Goals
1966–67	Rangers	Division One	14	2	0	0	0	0	5	0	19	2
1967–68	Rangers	Division One	9	0	1	0	6	1	1	0	17	1
1968–69	Rangers	Division One	18	4	0	0	2	3	4	1	24	8
1969–70	Rangers	Division One	14	0	1	1	4	1	3	0	22	2
1970–71	Rangers	Division One	32	1	5	0	10	1	2	0	49	2
1971–72	Rangers	Division One	31	5	7	0	6	0	9	1	53	6
1972–73	Rangers	Division One	34	2	6	0	11	0	2	0	53	2
1973–74	Rangers	Division One	34	3	2	0	11	0	4	0	51	3
1974–75	Rangers	Division One	34	9	2	0	5	5	0	0	41	14
1975–76	Rangers	Premier Division	25	2	3	0	7	5	2	0	37	7
1976–77	Rangers	Premier Division	36	2	5	2	11	6	2	0	56	10
1977–78	Rangers	Premier Division	32	5	5	0	7	1	4	0	48	6
1978–79	Rangers	Premier Division	35	0	9	1	10	1	6	0	60	2
1979–80	Rangers	Premier Division	35	3	6	2	4	0	6	0	51	5
1980–81	Rangers	Premier Division	32	3	6	0	4	0	0	0	42	3
1981–82	Rangers	Premier Division	36	1	6	2	8	1	2	0	52	4
Total			451	42	64	8	106	25	52	2	674	77
1982–83	Hearts	First Division	39	2	4	0	10	0	–	–	53	2
1983–84	Hearts	Premier Division	36	0	2	0	7	0	-	–	45	0
1984–85	Hearts	Premier Division	34	0	5	0	5	0	1	0	45	0
1985–86	Hearts	Premier Division	35	1	5	0	3	0	–	–	43	1
1986–87	Hearts	Premier Division	34	0	3	0	1	0	2	0	40	0
1987–88	Hearts	Premier Division	9	0	0	0	3	0	0	0	12	0
Total			187	3	19	0	29	0	3	0	238	3
Career total			638	45	83	8	135	25	55	2	912	80

=== International appearances ===
Scotland national team
Year	Apps	Goals
1970	1	0
1971	3	0
1972	0	0
1973	6	0
1974	11	1
1975	6	0
1976	0	0
1977	5	0
1978	2	0
1979	4	0
Total	38	1

=== International goals ===
Scores and results list Scotland's goal tally first.

#	Date	Venue	Opponent	Score	Result	Competition
1.	14 May 1974	Glasgow, Scotland	Wales	2–0	2–0	British Home Championship

== Honours ==
Rangers

- European Cup Winners' Cup: 1971–72
- Scottish League Champions: 1974–75, 1975–76, 1977–78
- Scottish Cup: 1972–73, 1975–76, 1977–78, 1978–79, 1980–81
- Scottish League Cup: 1970–71, 1975–76, 1977–78, 1978–79, 1981–82

Individual

- SFWA Footballer of the Year: 1974–75, 1985–86
- Scottish Football Hall of Fame inductee (2006)
- Rangers F.C. Hall of Fame inductee

== See also ==
- List of footballers in Scotland by number of league appearances (500+)
- List of Scotland national football team captains
