= Hamish McAlpine =

Scottish footballer

Personal information
- Full name: Hamish Robert McAlpine
- Date of birth: 21 January 1948 (age 78)
- Place of birth: Kilspindie, Scotland
- Position: Goalkeeper

Youth career
- Butterburn Youth Club

Senior career*
Years	Team	Apps	(Gls)
- Dundee North End
1966–1986	Dundee United	477	(3)
1967–1968	→ Montrose (loan)	25	(0)
1986	→ Dunfermline Athletic (loan)	1	(0)
1986–1988	Raith Rovers	72	(1)
1988–1989	Arbroath	10	(0)
Total		585	(4)

International career
1982–1984	Scotland U21	5	(0)
- * Club domestic league appearances and goals

Hamish Robert McAlpine (born 21 January 1948) is a Scottish retired footballer who played as a goalkeeper. He played for Dundee United for twenty years, between 1966 and 1986. Whilst with the club, he won the Scottish Football League title once and the Scottish League Cup twice. Among numerous cup runs in European football he played in the 1983–84 European Cup semi-final.

He ended his playing career with spells at Raith Rovers and Arbroath. McAlpine represented Scotland at under-21 international level and was named SFWA Footballer of the Year in 1985.

== Early life ==
McAlpine was born in the village of Kilspindie, Perthshire. (Note: Now in the Perth and Kinross council area.) His father, Ian McAlpine, was a promising footballer whose career was disrupted by the Second World War, although he did sign for Dundee in 1946 and played for their reserve team. Although his father had been a centre forward, Hamish always played as a goalkeeper from primary school onwards. As a teenager, he played in goal for Butterburn Youth Club.

== Club career ==
McAlpine played junior football for Dundee North End prior to signing provisionally for Dundee United in June 1966. He combined part-time football with a job at United chairman George Fox's accountancy firm until signing a professional contract in the close season of 1967. Initially third choice goalkeeper behind Donald Mackay and Sandy Davie, McAlpine spent most of the 1967–68 season on loan to Montrose, and came close to signing for them permanently. Returning to United, he made his debut appearance for the first team in a pre-season friendly against Hartlepool in August 1968.

Davie left the club in October 1968, which made McAlpine second choice. Following an injury to Mackay, he made his competitive debut for Dundee United on 8 March 1969, in a 1–0 defeat against Heart of Midlothian at Tynecastle. That proved to be his only appearance that season, and he missed most of the following season following an operation for ligament damage. In October 1970, McAlpine came on as a substitute for the injured Mackay in a Fairs Cup tie against Sparta Prague to make his European debut and only his second competitive appearance overall. That proved to be a breakthrough for McAlpine, who went to make thirty appearances in all competitions that season and establish himself as first choice. Mackay was allowed to leave the club in 1972 by new manager Jim McLean, who brought back Davie as competition. McAlpine was still in the team until knee surgery ruled him out for a spell in 1974, which meant Davie played in United's first Scottish Cup final appearance.

Davie's subsequent departure left McAlpine as the club's undisputed first choice goalkeeper, a position he would retain for the next decade. In 1977, he set a club record by not conceding a goal for 615 minutes of play. He was also building a reputation for eccentricity and becoming a cult favourite with United supporters, often leaving his penalty area to take on opponents. In 1976, United were struggling to avoid relegation and had missed several penalties. McAlpine volunteered to take over as penalty taker, scoring on his first attempt against Hibernian in the penultimate match of the season. Another McAlpine penalty, in the final match away to Rangers, was missed, but United retained their Premier Division status with a goalless draw. McAlpine scored twice more during the 1976–77 season, but was relieved of penalty duties after further misses. He later came close to scoring another United goal, hitting the bar with a shot whilst playing outfield in a reserve match.

McAlpine's carefree attitude sometimes put him in conflict with his disciplinarian manager. In his autobiography, McLean describes his frustration with McAlpine's unwillingness to undertake specialist goalkeeping training, saying, "Hamish McAlpine was the one player who was able to destroy single-handedly everything I have ever thought or believed about the game of football". The pair's most serious disagreement occurred in 1979, resulting in McAlpine being sent home from a tournament in Japan. McAlpine was suspended by the club and temporarily replaced by former England goalkeeper Peter Bonetti.

Having won his place back from Bonetti, McAlpine was part of the United side that reached the club's first ever Scottish League Cup final in December 1979. After a goalless draw against Aberdeen, a 3–0 replay win at Dundee's Dens Park gave the club their first ever major trophy. A year later, United were again at Dens in the League Cup final, this time facing local rivals Dundee. After another 3–0 victory for United, club captain Paul Hegarty was about to collect the trophy when he stepped aside, instead ushering McAlpine forward to receive it, in recognition of his service to the club. Later the same season, the goalkeeper made his first appearance in a Scottish Cup final, against Rangers. With the match goalless, McAlpine saved a last minute penalty to secure a replay, but United lost the second game 4–1. In addition, Sturrock finished in third place for the Scottish Writers' award in 1981.

McAlpine was dropped for a League Cup tie against Falkirk in August 1982, with reserve goalkeeper John Gardiner taking his place. Despite McLean hinting that Gardiner might be set for an extended run in the first team, McAlpine was restored to the team for the next match. He went on to be ever-present in League matches during the 1982–83 season as Dundee United won the Scottish Football League title for the first time in the club's history. At the beginning of the following season, McAlpine's seventeen-year career at the club was marked with a testimonial match against Tottenham Hotspur.

United's league title success qualified the club for the 1983–84 European Cup, with McAlpine featuring in all eight matches as the team went on to reach the semi-finals. He faced competition for his place in the side, however, when McLean signed Scottish international goalkeeper Billy Thomson in June 1984. Although Thomson began the 1984–85 season as first choice, McAlpine had re-established himself in the team by the end of September. He went on to feature in two more cup finals that season, although United lost to Rangers in the League Cup and Celtic in the Scottish Cup. McAlpine's performances throughout the season saw him chosen by members of the Scottish Football Writers' Association as their Footballer of the Year for 1985.

McAlpine was injured in October 1985 and lost his place in the side to Thomson. He played one match on loan to Dunfermline Athletic in April 1986, shortly before it was announced that he would be leaving Dundee United at the end of the season after twenty years at the club.

He joined Raith Rovers in the close season of 1986, helping them win promotion from the Scottish Second Division in his first season. In September 1987, McAlpine added a fourth goal to his career total, scoring directly from a kick-out for Raith against Kilmarnock.

Intending to retire, McAlpine left Raith after two seasons but was asked to assist Celtic during a pre-season tour of Switzerland in July 1988, as cover for the injured Pat Bonner and Andy Murdoch. He subsequently joined Second Division Arbroath for a short spell prior to retiring in 1989.

== International career ==
McAlpine gained international recognition in his mid-thirties, featuring as a permitted overage player for the Scotland Under-21 team. He made his debut in a 2–0 win over East Germany in Edinburgh on 12 October 1982. The last of his five appearances came against Belgium on 11 October 1983 when he was 35 years old, in a goalless draw played on McAlpine's club ground, Tannadice Park.

== After playing ==
McAlpine has worked intermittently for Dundee United in various part-time capacities, including as a goalkeeping coach, in the commercial department and as a matchday host. He was appointed as a club ambassador in 2014. He opened a pub called Goalie's in Dundee in 1986. Since retiring as a player he has worked as a sales representative.

== Personal life ==
Amongst his other sporting interests, McAlpine has appeared for Rossie Priory Cricket Club, where his brother Derek McAlpine was a long-serving player. Also a keen golfer, McAlpine became captain at Alyth Golf Club in 2010. His son Kevin McAlpine was Scottish Amateur golf champion in 2006, subsequently turning professional and later caddying for Lexi Thompson, Amy Yang and Martin Laird. Kevin is engaged to Swedish golfer Anna Nordqvist.

== Career statistics ==
Club	Season	League		Cup		Lg Cup		Other		Total	
Club	Season	Apps	Goals	Apps	Goals	Apps	Goals	Apps	Goals	Apps	Goals
Dundee United	1966–67	0	0	0	0	0	0	0	0	0	0
Dundee United	1967–68	0	0	0	0	0	0	0	0	0	0
Montrose (loan)	1967–68	25	0	N/A		N/A		0	0	25	0
Dundee United	1968–69	1	0	0	0	0	0	0	0	1	0
Dundee United	1969–70	0	0	0	0	0	0	0	0	0	0
Dundee United	1970–71	24	0	4	0	0	0	2	0	30	0
Dundee United	1971–72	29	0	1	0	6	0	0	0	36	0
Dundee United	1972–73	24	0	1	0	8	0	0	0	33	0
Dundee United	1973–74	19	0	2	0	6	0	0	0	27	0
Dundee United	1974–75	34	0	3	0	6	0	4	0	47	0
Dundee United	1975–76	36	1	3	0	6	0	4	0	49	1
Dundee United	1976–77	36	2	1	0	6	0	0	0	43	2
Dundee United	1977–78	35	0	4	0	8	0	2	0	49	0
Dundee United	1978–79	36	0	1	0	2	0	2	0	41	0
Dundee United	1979–80	29	0	2	0	7	0	4	0	42	0
Dundee United	1980–81	36	0	7	0	11	0	4	0	58	0
Dundee United	1981–82	34	0	5	0	10	0	8	0	58	0
Dundee United	1982–83	36	0	1	0	9	0	8	0	54	0
Dundee United	1983–84	34	0	4	0	10	0	8	0	56	0
Dundee United	1984–85	25	0	6	0	3	0	5	0	39	0
Dundee United	1985–86	8	0	0	0	5	0	1	0	14	0
Dundee United	Total	477	3	45	0	103	0	52	0	677	3
Dunfermline Athletic (loan)	1985–86	1	0	0	0	0	0	0	0	1	0
Raith Rovers	1986–87	37	0	3	0	1	0	0	0	41	0
Raith Rovers	1987–88	35	1	2	0	2	0	0	0	39	1
Raith Rovers	Total	72	1	5	0	3	0	0	0	80	1
Arbroath	1988–89	10	0	0	0	0	0	0	0	10	0
Career total		585	4	50	0	106	0	52	0	793	4

== Honours and accolades ==
The song "Hamish (the Goalie)", by Dundonian singer-songwriter Michael Marra (though a Dundee F.C. supporter), was originally written to mark McAlpine's testimonial year. It was later released on Marra's 1991 album, On Stolen Stationery, and has also been covered by Leo Sayer. The lyrics of the song pay tribute to McAlpine's goalkeeping prowess as well as alluding to Grace Kelly's appearance as a spectator at Tannadice for a UEFA Cup tie against AS Monaco.

=== Club ===
Dundee United

- Scottish Football League Premier Division: 1982–83
- Scottish League Cup: 1979–80, 1980–81

=== Individual ===
- SFWA Footballer of the Year: 1985

== See also ==
- List of footballers in Scotland by number of league appearances (500+)
- List of goalscoring goalkeepers
