= 1984 Scottish League Cup final (October) =

- Event: 1984–85 Scottish League Cup
Rangers	Dundee United
1	0
- Date: 28 October 1984
- Venue: Hampden Park, Glasgow
- Referee: Brian McGinlay
- Attendance: 44,698

The 1984–85 Scottish League Cup final was played on 28 October 1984, at Hampden Park in Glasgow and was the final of the 39th Scottish League Cup. The final was contested by Rangers and Dundee United. Rangers won the match 1–0 thanks to an Iain Ferguson goal.

== Match details ==
28 October 1984

Rangers	1–0	Dundee United
Ferguson 44'

Hampden Park, Glasgow
Attendance: 44,698
Referee: Brian McGinlay

RANGERS :
GK	Peter McCloy
RB	Dave McPherson
CB	Ally Dawson
CB	John McClelland
LB	Craig Paterson (c)
RM	Cammy Fraser
CM	Bobby Russell	(substituted off) 1'
CM	Iain Ferguson	(substituted off) 2'
LM	Ian Redford
CF	Davie Cooper
CF	Ally McCoist
Substitutes:
MF	Robert Prytz	(substituted on) 1'
FW	David Mitchell	(substituted on) 2'
Manager:
Jock Wallace

DUNDEE UNITED :
GK	Hamish McAlpine
RB	John Holt	(substituted off) 1'
CB	Maurice Malpas (c)
CB	Richard Gough
CB	David Narey
LB	Paul Hegarty
RM	Eamonn Bannon
CM	Ralph Milne	(substituted off) 2'
LM	Billy Kirkwood
CF	Paul Sturrock
CF	Davie Dodds
Substitutes:
DF	John Clark	(substituted on) 1'
MF	Stuart Beedie	(substituted on) 2'
Manager:
Jim McLean

== See also ==
Played between same clubs:

- 1981 Scottish League Cup final
- 2008 Scottish League Cup final
