= Ian Redford =

Ian Redford may refer to:

- Ian Redford (footballer)
- Ian Redford (actor)
