= 1984 Scottish League Cup final (March) =

- Event: 1983–84 Scottish League Cup
Rangers	Celtic
3	2
- Date: 25 March 1984
- Venue: Hampden Park, Glasgow
- Referee: Bob Valentine
- Attendance: 66,369

The 1983–84 Scottish League Cup final was played on 25 March 1984, at Hampden Park in Glasgow and was the final of the 38th Scottish League Cup competition. The final was an Old Firm derby contested by Rangers and Celtic.

Rangers won the match 3–2 thanks to an Ally McCoist hat-trick. He scored a penalty in the first half, conceded a foul to give Celtic theirs in the last minute of normal time and then was himself fouled during extra time; although he had this second penalty saved, he scored the winning goal from the rebound.

== Match details ==
25 March 1984

Rangers	3–2 (a.e.t.)	Celtic
McCoist 44' (pen.), 61', 104'		McClair 67'; Reid 89' (pen.)

Hampden Park, Glasgow
Attendance: 66,369
Referee: Bob Valentine

RANGERS :
GK	Peter McCloy
RB	Jimmy Nicholl
LB	Ally Dawson
CB	John McClelland (c)
CB	Craig Paterson
RM	Davie Cooper
CM	Bobby Russell
CM	Dave McPherson
LM	John MacDonald	(substituted off) 1'
CF	Sandy Clark	(substituted off) 2'
CF	Ally McCoist
Substitutes:
MF	Hugh Burns	(substituted in) 1'
FW	Colin McAdam	(substituted in) 2'
Manager:
Jock Wallace

CELTIC :
GK	Packie Bonner
RB	Danny McGrain (c)
CB	Tom McAdam
CB	Roy Aitken
CM	Murdo MacLeod
LM	Tommy Burns
RM	Davie Provan	(substituted off) 1'
CM	Paul McStay
LB	Mark Reid
CF	Frank McGarvey	(substituted off) 2'
CF	Brian McClair
Substitutes:
DF	Graeme Sinclair	(substituted in) 1'
FW	Jim Melrose	(substituted in) 2'
Manager:
David Hay
