= 1976–77 Dundee United F.C. season =

Dundee United
1976–77 season
- Manager: Jim McLean
- Stadium: Tannadice Park
- Scottish Premier Division: 4th (UEFA Cup); W16 D9 L11 F54 A45 P41
- Scottish Cup: 3rd Round
- League Cup: Group stage
- Anglo-Scottish Cup: 1st Round

The 1976–77 season was the 68th year of football played by Dundee United, and covers the period from 1 July 1976 to 30 June 1977. United finished in fourth place, securing UEFA Cup football for the following season.

== Match results ==
Dundee United played a total of 44 competitive matches during the 1976–77 season.

=== Legend ===
Win
Draw
Loss

All results are written with Dundee United's score first. Own goals in italics

=== Premier Division ===
Date	Opponent	Venue	Result	Attendance	Scorers
4 September 1976	Hibernian	A	2–1	7,264	McAlpine (penalty), Wallace
11 September 1976	Celtic	H	1–0	13,454	Wallace
18 September 1976	Ayr United	A	4–1	4,445	McAdam, Hegarty, Sturrock, Wallace
25 September 1976	Partick Thistle	H	2–1	6,346	McAdam (2)
2 October 1976	Motherwell	H	2–0	6,348	Hegarty, Sturrock
20 October 1976	Celtic	A	1–5	22,251	Sturrock
23 October 1976	Heart of Midlothian	A	2–1	11,516	Sturrock, Wallace
30 October 1976	Aberdeen	A	2–3	19,577	Fraser, Wallace
3 November 1976	Kilmarnock	H	3–0	4,886	Sturrock, Hegarty, Rolland
6 November 1976	Hibernian	H	2–1	7,044	Wallace, McAdam
9 November 1976	Rangers	A	0–3	17,432	
20 November 1976	Ayr United	H	2–2	4,773	Sturrock, Wallace
27 November 1976	Partick Thistle	A	5–1	4,105	Wallace (2), Sturrock (2), Fleming
18 December 1976	Kilmarnock	A	0–1	3,529	
27 December 1976	Heart of Midlothian	H	1–1	9,615	Payne
5 January 1977	Hibernian	A	0–0	7,727	
8 January 1977	Celtic	H	1–2	15,847	McAdam
7 February 1977	Ayr United	A	4–1	3,843	Wallace, Narey, Sturrock, Hegarty
12 February 1977	Rangers	A	3–2	18,656	Sturrock, McAlpine (penalty), Wallace
16 February 1977	Motherwell	H	1–1	6,081	Sturrock
19 February 1977	Kilmarnock	H	4–0	5,096	Wallace (2), McAdam (2)
1 March 1977	Partick Thistle	H	0–0	4,713	
5 March 1977	Heart of Midlothian	A	1–1	7,820	Sturrock
8 March 1977	Rangers	H	0–0	10,743	
12 March 1977	Aberdeen	A	1–0	13,592	Sturrock
16 March 1977	Aberdeen	H	3–2	7,176	Narey, Hegarty, McAdam
19 March 1977	Hibernian	H	1–0	6,130	Hegarty
26 March 1977	Celtic	A	0–2	35,899	
2 April 1977	Ayr United	H	0–1	4,248	
9 April 1977	Partick Thistle	A	0–0	4,427	
13 April 1977	Aberdeen	H	2–3	4,613	Sturrock, Rolland
17 April 1977	Motherwell	A	0–4	5,821	
20 April 1977	Heart of Midlothian	H	1–2	3,262	Kirkwood
23 April 1977	Rangers	H	0–1	7,919	
30 April 1977	Kilmarnock	H	2–1	1,643	McAdam, Sturrock
4 May 1977	Motherwell	A	1–1	2,367	Williamson

=== Scottish Cup ===
Date	Rd	Opponent	Venue	Result	Attendance	Scorers
29 January 1977	R3	St Mirren	A	1–4	16,357	Sturrock

=== League Cup ===
Date	Rd	Opponent	Venue	Result	Attendance	Scorers
14 August 1976	G2	Celtic	H	0–1	14,555	
18 August 1976	G2	Arbroath	A	3–1	2,606	Dodds (2), Sturrock
21 August 1976	G2	Dumbarton	A	2–1	1,756	Reid, Hegarty
25 August 1976	G2	Arbroath	H	2–0	3,230	Fleming, Hegarty
28 August 1976	G2	Dumbarton	H	1–1	3,932	McAdam
1 September 1976	G2	Celtic	A	1–1	13,772	Hegarty

=== Anglo-Scottish Cup ===
Date	Rd	Opponent	Venue	Result	Attendance	Scorers
7 August 1976	R1 1	Aberdeen	H	1–0	5,550	Hall
11 August 1976	R1 2	Aberdeen	A	1–3	10,709	McAdam

== League table ==
Pos	Team	Pld	W	D	L	GF	GA	GD	Pts	Qualification or relegation
2	Rangers	36	18	10	8	62	37	+25	46	Qualification for the Cup Winners' Cup first round
3	Aberdeen	36	16	11	9	56	42	+14	43	Qualification for the UEFA Cup first round
4	Dundee United	36	16	9	11	54	45	+9	41	Qualification for the UEFA Cup first round
5	Partick Thistle	36	11	13	12	40	44	−4	35	
6	Hibernian	36	8	18	10	34	35	−1	34	

Source: Statto
Rules for classification: 1) points; 2) goal difference; 3) number of goals scored.

== See also ==
- 1976–77 in Scottish football
