= 2008 Scottish League Cup final =

- Event: 2007–08 Scottish League Cup
Dundee United	Rangers
2	2
- After extra time. Rangers won 3–2 on penalties.
- Date: 16 March 2008
- Venue: Hampden Park, Glasgow
- Man of the Match: Kris Boyd
- Referee: Kenny Clark
- Attendance: 50,019

The 2008 Scottish League Cup final was played on 16 March 2008 at Hampden Park in Glasgow and was the 61st Scottish League Cup final. The final was contested by Dundee United, who beat Aberdeen 4–1 in the semi-final, and Rangers, who beat Hearts 2–0. The two sides had last met in a League Cup final in the 1984–85 season with Rangers winning 1–0 on that occasion. The previous year's winners were Hibernian, who beat Kilmarnock 5–1 in the 2007 final but they were knocked out in the third round by Motherwell. It was the fifth successive year in which both of the previous year's finalists did not make it to the final. Rangers won the match 3–2 on penalties after the match had ended in a 2–2 draw after extra time.

== Route to the Final ==
=== Dundee United ===
	Home team	Score	Away team
Round 2	Dundee United	3 – 1	Ross County
Round 3	Falkirk	1 – 3	Dundee United
Quarter-final	Dundee United	3 – 1	Hamilton Academical
Semi-final	Dundee United	4 – 1	Aberdeen

=== Rangers ===
	Home team	Score	Away team
Round 3	East Fife	0 – 4	Rangers
Quarter-final	Motherwell	1 – 2	Rangers
Semi-final	Rangers	2 – 0	Hearts

== Match ==
=== Team news ===
Dundee United manager Craig Levein made four changes after the side's midweek goalless draw at Celtic. Noel Hunt returned to the starting line-up along with Christian Kalvenes, Willo Flood and Morgaro Gomis. Out went David Robertson and Craig Conway, who dropped to the bench and cup-tied duo Danny Grainger and James O'Brien.

Rangers were without the suspended duo Nacho Novo and Charlie Adam, who were replaced by Lee McCulloch and Chris Burke.

=== Match Summary ===
Neither team looked better than the other during a fairly uneventful first 10 minutes. in the 18th minute the Rangers captain Barry Ferguson forced Dundee United's goalkeeper, Łukasz Załuska to produce the first real save of the game. It was Dundee United however who became the dominant team as the first half progressed and took a deserved lead in the 33rd minute, the first shot by Noel Hunt was saved by Allan McGregor but the ball wasn't cleared and Hunt somehow managed to get the ball over the line despite the best efforts of Steven Davis. United could have been two goals in front moments later as Saša Papac almost scored an own goal with a pass back but Carlos Cuéllar was there to clear it off the line.

Before the second half got underway, Rangers manager Walter Smith made a substitution with midfielder Brahim Hemdani making way for Striker Jean-Claude Darcheville. The second half started in a similar way to the first, with neither team in control. United felt they should have been awarded a penalty in the 53rd minute when Cuellar appeared to pull back Christian Kalvenes in the box, but referee Kenny Clark inexplicably waved play on. Walter Smith made another substitution in the 61st minute when the left back Papac was replaced by Striker Kris Boyd. Darcheville headed the ball into the net in the 77th minute from a quickly-taken free-kick, but the referee decided that Ferguson had taken the set-piece too quickly. Rangers scored the equalizing goal with 6 minutes of normal time remaining, Mark Kerr attempted a pass back to his goalkeeper but Boyd was there to score the goal that would take the match into Extra time.

The first half of extra time got underway with Rangers looking the better team, however with just 5 minutes played Mark de Vries restored United's lead when he put the ball past McGregor with a strike from the top-right edge of the box. Rangers dominated the second half and were rewarded when Boyd headed in the equalizer at the back post in 112th minute. The match would be decided by a Penalty shootout, Boyd scored the winning penalty after a miss by Lee Wilkie.

=== Match details ===
16 March 2008
15:00

Dundee United	2–2 (a.e.t.)	Rangers
Hunt 34' de Vries 95'	Report	Boyd 85', 113'
Penalties
Flood (penalty scored); Conway (penalty missed) de Vries (penalty scored); Robertson (penalty missed); Wilkie (penalty missed)	2–3	(penalty missed) Darcheville; (penalty scored) Whittaker; (penalty scored) Davis; (penalty missed) McCulloch; (penalty scored) Boyd

Hampden Park, Glasgow
Attendance: 50,019
Referee: K Clark

Dundee United	Rangers

DUNDEE UNITED :
GK	1	(Poland) Łukasz Załuska
RB	24	(Switzerland) Mihael Kovačević
CB	18	(Scotland) Garry Kenneth
CB	4	(Scotland) Lee Wilkie (c)
LB	3	(Norway) Christian Kalvenes	(yellow card) 94'
RM	20	(Ghana) Prince Buaben		(substituted off) 96'
CM	6	(Republic of Ireland) Willo Flood
CM	7	(Scotland) Mark Kerr
LM	16	(Senegal) Morgaro Gomis
CF	10	(Republic of Ireland) Noel Hunt		(substituted off) 78'
CF	22	(Suriname) Mark de Vries
Substitutes:
GK	13	(Scotland) Euan McLean
DF	5	(Scotland) Darren Dods
DF	2	(Republic of Ireland) Sean Dillon
MF	12	(Scotland) David Robertson		(substituted on) 95'
MF	15	(Scotland) Craig Conway		(substituted on) 78'
Manager:
(Scotland) Craig Levein

RANGERS:
GK	1	(Scotland) Allan McGregor
RB	21	(Scotland) Kirk Broadfoot	(yellow card) 54'
CB	24	(Spain) Carlos Cuéllar
CB	3	(Scotland) David Weir
LB	5	(Bosnia and Herzegovina) Saša Papac		(substituted off) 61'
RM	17	(Scotland) Chris Burke		(substituted off) 116'
CM	7	(Algeria) Brahim Hemdani		(substituted off) 45'
CM	6	(Scotland) Barry Ferguson (c)
CM	23	(Scotland) Christian Dailly
LM	12	(Northern Ireland) Steven Davis
CF	27	(Scotland) Lee McCulloch	(yellow card) 64'
Substitutes:
GK	25	(Scotland) Neil Alexander
DF	28	(Scotland) Steven Whittaker		(substituted on) 116'
MF	8	(Scotland) Kevin Thomson
CF	9	(Scotland) Kris Boyd		(substituted on) 61'
CF	19	(France) Jean-Claude Darcheville		(substituted on) 45'
Manager:
(Scotland) Walter Smith

=== Statistics ===
	Dundee United	Rangers
Total shots	11	13
Shots on target	4	7
Corner kicks	6	8
Fouls committed	19	19
Yellow cards	1	2
Red cards	0	0

== See also ==
Played between same clubs:

- 1981 Scottish League Cup final
- 1984 Scottish League Cup final (October)
