= PFA Scotland Young Player of the Year =

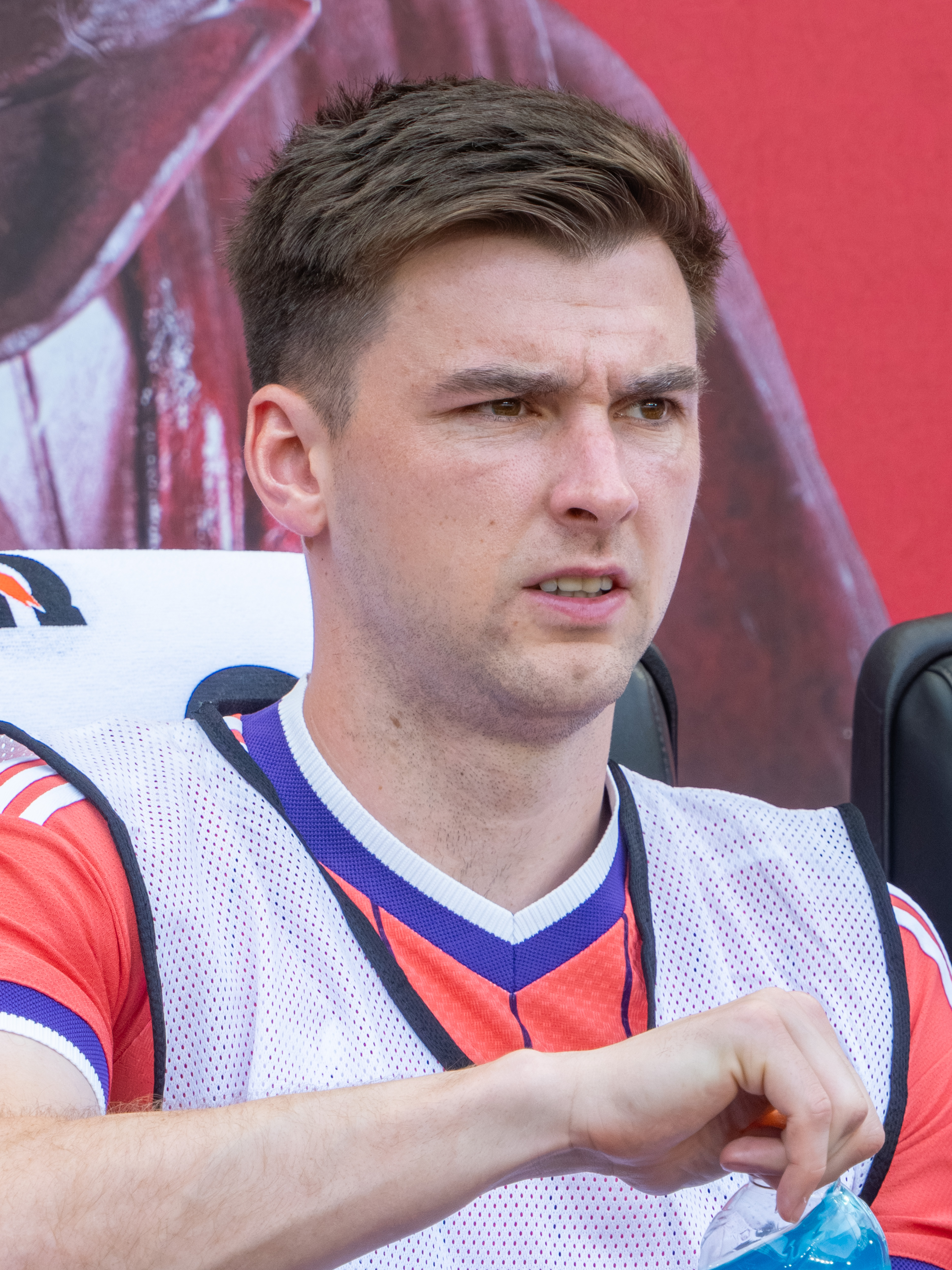
- Kieran Tierney won the award three times in consecutive seasons
- Awarded for: The outstanding young player in each given Scottish football season
- Country: Scotland
- Presented by: PFA Scotland
- First award: 1978
- Young Player of the Year: Mikey Moore

Highlights
- Most awards: Kieran Tierney (3)

The PFA Scotland Young Player of the Year, formerly known as the Scottish PFA Young Player of the Year, is named at the end of every Scottish football season. The members of the Professional Footballers' Association Scotland vote on which of its young members played the best football in the previous year. The award was first given in 1978, to Graeme Payne. The Bulgarian international Stiliyan Petrov was the first non-Scottish player to win the award, when he did so in 2001.

== List of winners ==
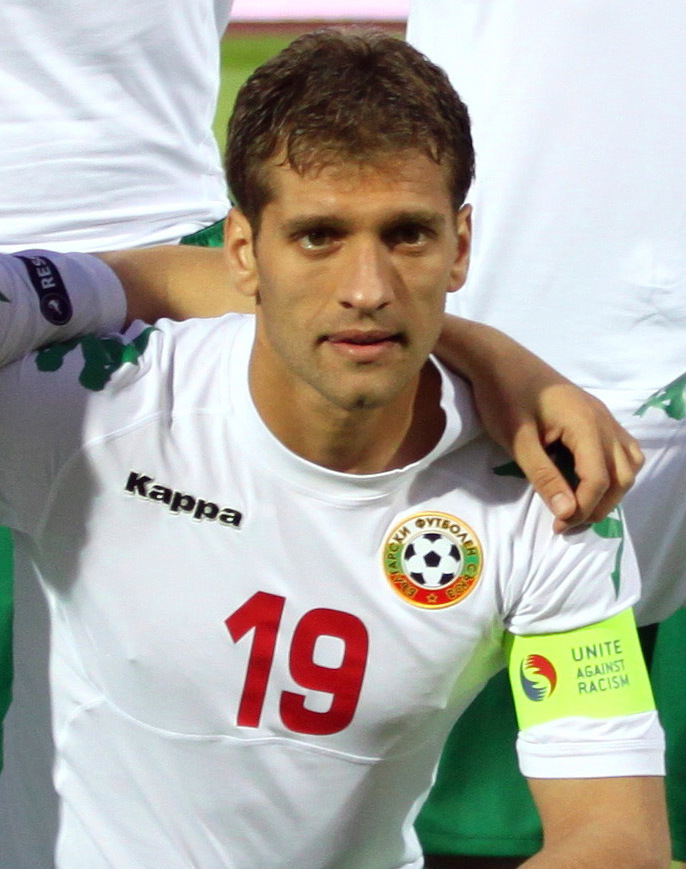
The first foreign winner of the award was Stiliyan Petrov, in 2001

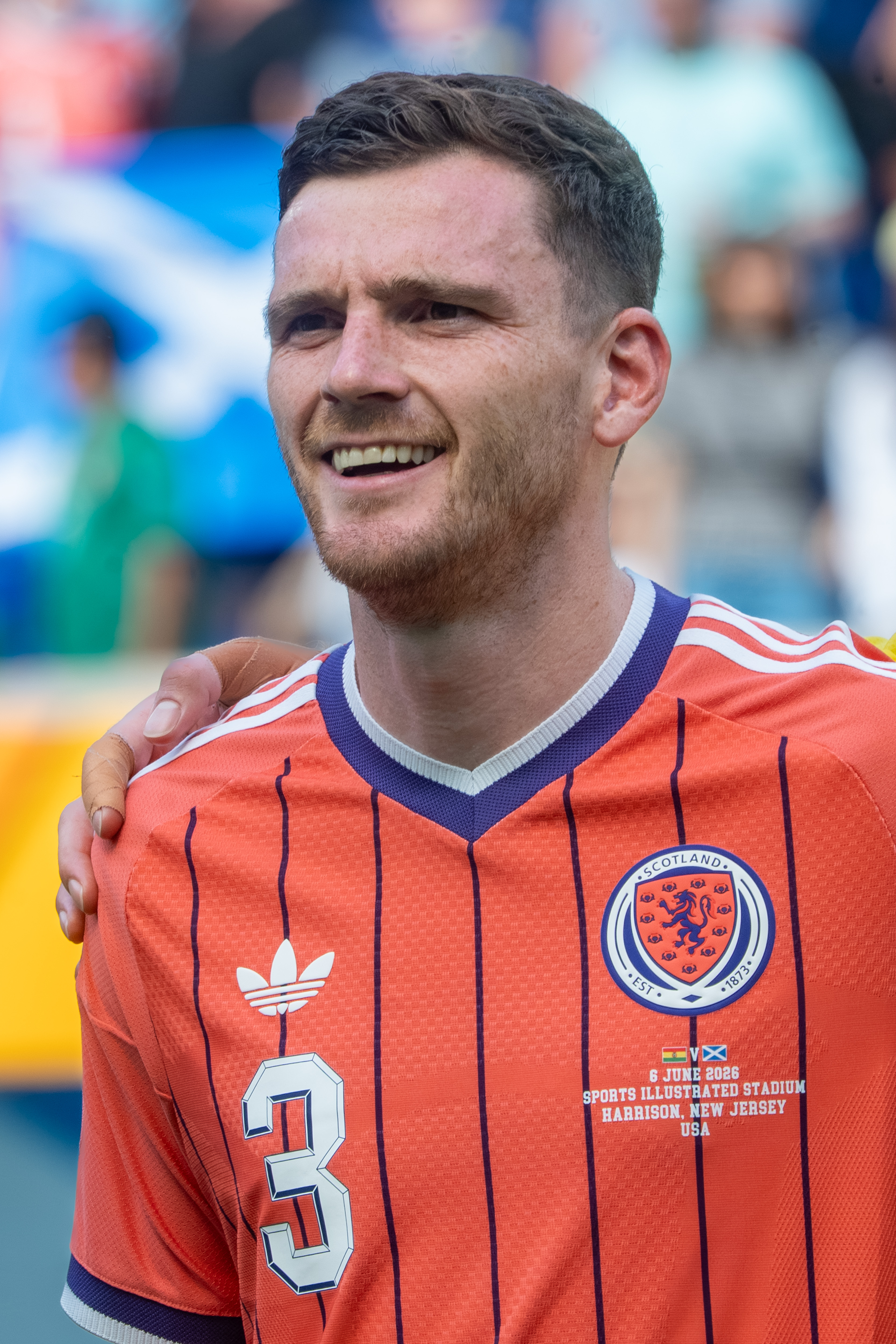
Dundee United left-back Andy Robertson won the award in 2014

As of 2026, the award has been presented 48 times and won by 43 different players. Kieran Tierney (3), Craig Levein (2), Eoin Jess (2) and Phil O'Donnell (2) are the players who have won the award more than once.

Season	Nat	Player	Club	Notes	Ref
1977–78	(Scotland)	Graeme Payne	Dundee United		
1978–79	(Scotland)	Ray Stewart	Dundee United		
1979–80	(Scotland)	John MacDonald	Rangers		
1980–81	(Scotland)	Charlie Nicholas	Celtic		
1981–82	(Scotland)	Frank McAvennie	St Mirren		
1982–83	(Scotland)	Paul McStay	Celtic		
1983–84	(Scotland)	John Robertson	Heart of Midlothian		
1984–85	(Scotland)	Craig Levein	Heart of Midlothian		
1985–86	(Scotland)	Craig Levein	Heart of Midlothian		
1986–87	(Scotland)	Robert Fleck	Rangers		
1987–88	(Scotland)	John Collins	Hibernian		
1988–89	(Scotland)	Billy McKinlay	Dundee United		
1989–90	(Scotland)	Scott Crabbe	Heart of Midlothian		
1990–91	(Scotland)	Eoin Jess	Aberdeen		
1991–92	(Scotland)	Phil O'Donnell	Motherwell		
1992–93	(Scotland)	Eoin Jess	Aberdeen		
1993–94	(Scotland)	Phil O'Donnell	Motherwell		
1994–95	(Scotland)	Charlie Miller	Rangers		
1995–96	(Scotland)	Jackie McNamara	Celtic		
1996–97	(Scotland)	Robbie Winters	Dundee United		
1997–98	(Scotland)	Gary Naysmith	Heart of Midlothian		
1998–99	(Scotland)	Barry Ferguson	Rangers		
1999–00	(Scotland)	Kenny Miller	Hibernian		
2000–01	(Bulgaria)	Stiliyan Petrov	Celtic		
2001–02	(Scotland)	Kevin McNaughton	Aberdeen		
2002–03	(Scotland)	James McFadden	Motherwell		
2003–04	(Scotland)	Stephen Pearson	Celtic		
2004–05	(Scotland)	Derek Riordan	Hibernian	Also won the SFWA award.	
2005–06	(Scotland)	Shaun Maloney	Celtic	Also won the Players' Player of the Year award	
2006–07	(Scotland)	Steven Naismith	Kilmarnock		
2007–08	(Republic of Ireland)	Aiden McGeady	Celtic		
2008–09	(Republic of Ireland)	James McCarthy	Hamilton Academical		
2009–10	(Scotland)	Danny Wilson	Rangers	Also won the SFWA award.	
2010–11	(Scotland)	David Goodwillie	Dundee United	Also won the SFWA award.	
2011–12	(Scotland)	James Forrest	Celtic	Also won the SFWA award.	
2012–13	(Scotland)	Leigh Griffiths	Hibernian	Also won the SFWA Footballer of the Year award.	
2013–14	(Scotland)	Andy Robertson	Dundee United		
2014–15	(Belgium)	Jason Denayer	Celtic		
2015–16	(Scotland)	Kieran Tierney	Celtic	Also won the SFWA award.	
2016–17	(Scotland)	Kieran Tierney	Celtic	Also won the SFWA award.	
2017–18	(Scotland)	Kieran Tierney	Celtic	Also won the SFWA award.	
2018–19	(England)	Ryan Kent	Rangers		
2019–20	—N/a	—N/a	—N/a	Due to the COVID-19 pandemic, PFA Scotland cancelled their awards for the 2019–20 season.	
2020–21	(Scotland)	David Turnbull	Celtic		
2021–22	(Israel)	Liel Abada	Celtic		
2022–23	(United States)	Malik Tillman	Rangers		
2023–24	(Scotland)	David Watson	Kilmarnock	Also won the SFWA award.	
2024–25	(Scotland)	Lennon Miller	Motherwell	Also won the SFWA award.	
2025–26	(England)	Mikey Moore	Rangers		

== Breakdown of winners ==
=== Winners by club ===
Club	Number of wins	Winning seasons
Celtic	14	1980–81, 1982–83, 1995–96, 2000–01, 2003–04, 2005–06, 2007–08, 2011–12, 2014–15, 2015–16, 2016–17, 2017–18, 2020–21, 2021–22
Rangers	8	1979–80, 1980–87, 1994–95, 1998–99, 2009–10, 2018–19, 2022–23, 2025–26
Dundee United	6	1977–78, 1978–79, 1988–89, 1996–97, 2010–11, 2013–14
Heart of Midlothian	5	1983–84, 1984–85, 1985–86, 1989–90, 1997–98
Hibernian	4	1987–88, 1999–00, 2004–05, 2012–13
Motherwell	4	1991–92, 1993–94, 2002–03
Aberdeen	3	1990–91, 1992–93, 2001–02
Kilmarnock	2	2006–07, 2023–24
Hamilton Academical	1	2008–09
St Mirren	1	1981–82

=== Winners by country ===
Country	Number of wins	Winning seasons
Scotland	40	1977–78, 1978–79, 1979–80, 1980–81, 1981–82, 1982–83, 1983–84, 1984–85, 1985–86, 1986–87, 1987–88, 1988–89, 1989–90, 1990–91, 1991–92, 1992–93, 1993–94, 1994–95, 1995–96, 1996–97, 1997–98, 1998–99, 1999–00, 2001–02, 2002–03, 2003–04, 2004–05, 2005–06, 2006–07, 2009–10, 2010–11, 2011–12, 2012–13, 2013–14, 2015–16, 2016–17, 2017–18, 2020–21, 2023–24
England	2	2018–19, 2025–26
Republic of Ireland	2	2007–08, 2008–09
Belgium	1	2014–15
Bulgaria	1	2000–01
Israel	1	2021–22
United States	1	2022–23

== See also ==
- PFA Scotland Players' Player of the Year
- PFA Scotland Team of the Year
- PFA Scotland Manager of the Year
- SFWA Young Player of the Year
