= SFWA Footballer of the Year =

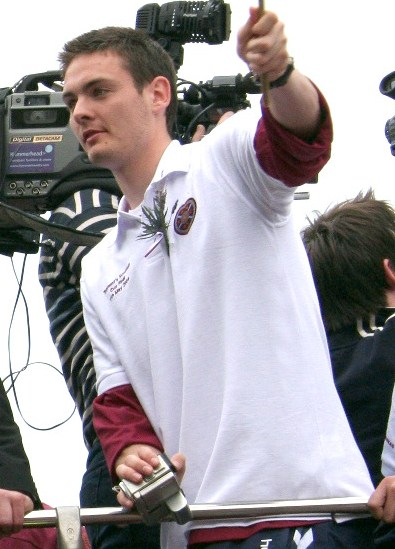
- Craig Gordon is the only player to have won the award three times
- Awarded for: The outstanding player in each given Scottish football season
- Country: Scotland
- Presented by: Scottish Football Writers' Association
- First award: 1965
- Final award: 202
- Footballer of the Year: Daizen Maeda

Highlights
- Most awards: Craig Gordon (3)

The Scottish Football Writers' Association Footballer of the Year (often called the SFWA Footballer of the Year, or simply the Scottish Footballer of the Year) is an annual award given to the player who is adjudged to have been the best of the season in Scottish football. The award has been presented since the 1964–65 season, and the winner is selected by a vote amongst the members of the Scottish Football Writers' Association (SFWA), which comprises over 100 football journalists based throughout Scotland. The first winner was Celtic's Billy McNeill, and the first non-Scottish winner was Mark Hateley of Rangers in 1994. Seven players have won the award on more than one occasion, and one, Craig Gordon, three times, winning his third award in the 2021–22 season.

The award was instigated in 1965, eight years after the association was founded, and committee member Allan Herron was charged with obtaining the permission of the Scottish Football Association to make the first award. Each member of the association casts one vote and also nominates a runner-up. In the event of a tie for first place the number of runner-up votes is taken into consideration. Although it is the older of the two awards, the SFWA award is considered by the players themselves to be of secondary importance to the PFA Scotland Players' Player of the Year because the winner of the PFA Scotland award is chosen by his fellow professionals.

== List of winners ==
The award has been presented on 62 occasions as of 2026, with 53 different individual players winning. Craig Gordon has won the award a record three times; six players (John Greig, Sandy Jardine, Brian Laudrup, Henrik Larsson, Barry Ferguson and Leigh Griffiths) have won the award twice; and on one occasion the award was presented collectively to the Scotland national squad. The table also indicates where the winning player also won the PFA Scotland Players' Player of the Year award (SPFA). In 2012–13, Leigh Griffiths became the first player to win the SFWA award and the PFA Scotland Young Player of the Year award in the same season.

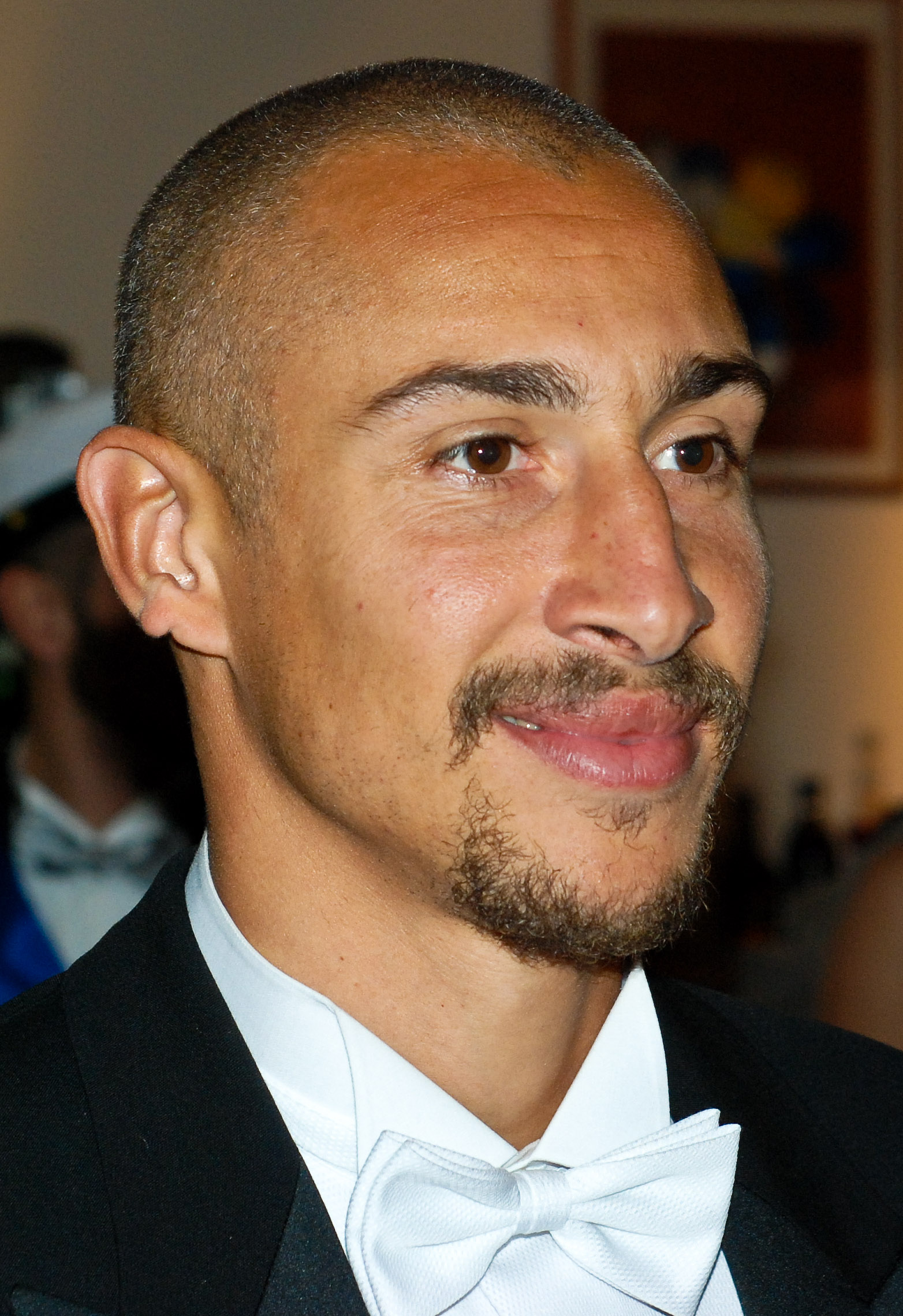
Henrik Larsson won the award twice.

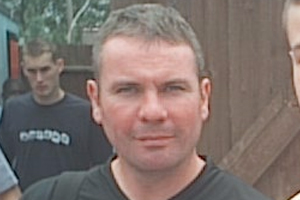
Brian McClair won the award in 1987.

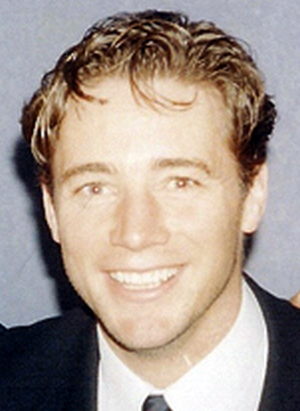
Ally McCoist was the 1992 winner.

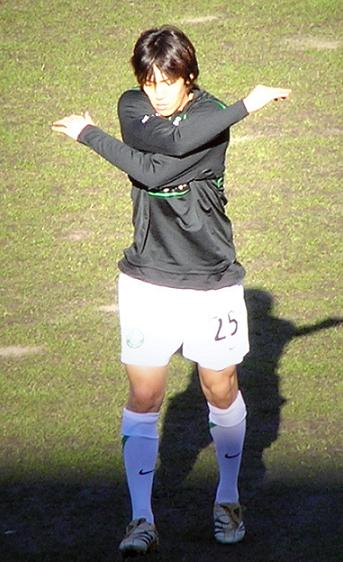
Shunsuke Nakamura was the 2007 winner.

Season		Player	Club	Also won	Notes
1964–65	SCO	Billy McNeill	Celtic		
1965–66	SCO	John Greig	Rangers		
1966–67	SCO	Ronnie Simpson	Celtic		
1967–68	SCO	Gordon Wallace	Raith Rovers		
1968–69	SCO	Bobby Murdoch	Celtic		
1969–70	SCO	Pat Stanton	Hibernian		
1970–71	SCO	Martin Buchan	Aberdeen		
1971–72	SCO	Dave Smith	Rangers		
1972–73	SCO	George Connelly	Celtic		
1973–74	SCO	Scotland World Cup squad	N/A		
1974–75	SCO	Sandy Jardine	Rangers		
1975–76	SCO	John Greig	Rangers		(Note: First player to win the award twice.)
1976–77	SCO	Danny McGrain	Celtic		
1977–78	SCO	Derek Johnstone	Rangers	SPFA	(Note: First player to win SFWA and SPFA awards in the same season.)
1978–79	SCO	Andy Ritchie	Morton		
1979–80	SCO	Gordon Strachan	Aberdeen		
1980–81	SCO	Alan Rough	Partick Thistle		
1981–82	SCO	Paul Sturrock	Dundee United		
1982–83	SCO	Charlie Nicholas	Celtic	SPFA	
1983–84	SCO	Willie Miller	Aberdeen	SPFA	
1984–85	SCO	Hamish McAlpine	Dundee United		
1985–86	SCO	Sandy Jardine	Heart of Midlothian		(Note: First player to win the award twice with two different clubs.)
1986–87	SCO	Brian McClair	Celtic	SPFA	
1987–88	SCO	Paul McStay	Celtic	SPFA	
1988–89	SCO	Richard Gough	Rangers		
1989–90	SCO	Alex McLeish	Aberdeen		
1990–91	SCO	Maurice Malpas	Dundee United		
1991–92	SCO	Ally McCoist	Rangers	SPFA	
1992–93	SCO	Andy Goram	Rangers	SPFA	
1993–94	ENG	Mark Hateley	Rangers	SPFA	(Note: First non-Scottish winner.)
1994–95	DEN	Brian Laudrup	Rangers	SPFA	(Note: First winner from outside the British Isles)
1995–96	ENG	Paul Gascoigne	Rangers	SPFA	
1996–97	DEN	Brian Laudrup	Rangers		
1997–98	SCO	Craig Burley	Celtic		
1998–99	SWE	Henrik Larsson	Celtic	SPFA	
1999–00	SCO	Barry Ferguson	Rangers		
2000–01	SWE	Henrik Larsson	Celtic	SPFA	
2001–02	SCO	Paul Lambert	Celtic		
2002–03	SCO	Barry Ferguson	Rangers	SPFA	
2003–04	SCO	Jackie McNamara	Celtic		
2004–05	WAL	John Hartson	Celtic	SPFA	(Note: Hartson shared the SPFA award with Fernando Ricksen.)
2005–06	SCO	Craig Gordon	Heart of Midlothian		
2006–07	JPN	Shunsuke Nakamura	Celtic	SPFA	(Note: First winner from outside Europe.)
2007–08	ESP	Carlos Cuéllar	Rangers		
2008–09	SCO	Gary Caldwell	Celtic		
2009–10	SCO	David Weir	Rangers		
2010–11	HON	Emilio Izaguirre	Celtic	PFA Scotland	
2011–12	SCO	Charlie Mulgrew	Celtic	PFA Scotland	
2012–13	SCO	Leigh Griffiths	Hibernian		
2013–14	SCO	Kris Commons	Celtic	PFA Scotland	
2014–15	SCO	Craig Gordon	Celtic		
2015–16	SCO	Leigh Griffiths	Celtic	PFA Scotland	
2016–17	ENG	Scott Sinclair	Celtic	PFA Scotland	
2017–18	SCO	Scott Brown	Celtic	PFA Scotland	
2018–19	SCO	James Forrest	Celtic	PFA Scotland	
2019–20	FRA	Odsonne Edouard	Celtic		
2020–21	NIR	Steven Davis	Rangers		
2021–22	SCO	Craig Gordon	Heart of Midlothian		
2022–23	JPN	Kyōgo Furuhashi	Celtic	PFA Scotland	
2023–24	SCO	Lawrence Shankland	Heart of Midlothian	PFA Scotland	
2024–25	JPN	Daizen Maeda	Celtic	PFA Scotland	
2025–26	POR	Cláudio Braga	Heart of Midlothian	PFA Scotland	

== Breakdown of winners ==
=== Winners by country ===
Country	Number of wins	Winning seasons
Scotland	46	1964–65, 1965–66, 1966–67, 1967–68, 1968–69, 1969–70, 1970–71, 1971–72, 1972–73, 1973–74, 1974–75, 1975–76, 1976–77, 1977–78, 1978–79, 1979–80, 1980–81, 1981–82, 1982–83, 1983–84, 1984–85, 1985–86, 1986–87, 1987–88, 1988–89, 1989–90, 1990–91, 1991–92, 1992–93, 1997–98, 1999–00, 2001–02, 2002–03, 2003–04, 2005–06, 2008–09, 2009–10, 2011–12, 2012–13, 2013–14, 2014–15, 2015–16, 2017–18, 2018–19, 2021–22, 2023–24
England	3	1993–94, 1995–96, 2016–17
Japan	3	2006–07, 2022–23, 2024–25
Denmark	2	1994–95, 1996–97
Sweden	2	1998–99, 2000–01
France	1	2019–20
Honduras	1	2010–11
Northern Ireland	1	2020–21
Portugal	1	2025–26
Spain	1	2007–08
Wales	1	2004–05

=== Winners by club ===
Club	Number of wins	Winning seasons
Celtic	27	1964–65, 1966–67, 1968–69, 1972–73, 1976–77, 1982–83, 1986–87, 1987–88, 1997–98, 1998–99, 2000–01, 2001–02, 2003–04, 2004–05, 2006–07, 2008–09, 2010–11, 2011–12, 2013–14, 2014–15, 2015–16, 2016–17, 2017–18, 2018–19, 2019–20, 2022–23, 2024–25
Rangers	17	1965–66, 1971–72, 1974–75, 1975–76, 1977–78, 1988–89, 1991–92, 1992–93, 1993–94, 1994–95, 1995–96, 1996–97, 1999–00, 2002–03, 2007–08, 2009–10, 2020–21
Heart of Midlothian	5	1985–86, 2005–06, 2021–22, 2023–24, 2025–26
Aberdeen	4	1970–71, 1979–80, 1983–84, 1989–90
Dundee United	3	1981–82, 1984–85, 1990–91
Hibernian	2	1969–70, 2012–13
Greenock Morton	1	1978–79
Partick Thistle	1	1980–81
Raith Rovers	1	1967–68
Scotland	1	1973–74

== See also ==
- PFA Scotland Players' Player of the Year
- PFA Scotland Young Player of the Year
- PFA Scotland Team of the Year
- PFA Players' Player of the Year
- FWA Footballer of the Year
- PFAI Players' Player of the Year
- Rex Kingsley Footballer of the Year
- SFWA International Player of the Year
- SFWA Manager of the Year
- SFWA Young Player of the Year
