= Kenny Lyall =

Scottish footballer

Personal information
- Full name: Kenneth Lyall
- Date of birth: 23 March 1963 (age 63)
- Place of birth: Edinburgh, Scotland
- Position: Midfielder

Senior career*
Years	Team	Apps	(Gls)
1981–1983	Rangers	9	(0)
1983–1984	Motherwell	19	(2)
1984–1985	St Johnstone	29	(2)
1985–1988	Brechin City	48	(1)
- * Club domestic league appearances and goals

Kenny Lyall (born 23 March 1963 in Edinburgh) was a Scottish professional football player in the 1980s who is best known for his time with the Glasgow Rangers.

A midfielder, Lyall began his career with Rangers. Whilst at Ibrox he made 11 appearances. He joined Motherwell in 1983 and spent one season there making over 20 appearances. A brief season with St Johnstone was followed by a move to Brechin City, where he totaled 48 appearances from 1985 to 1988. In 1988, Lyall left the Scottish Football League to sign for Newtongrange Star.

In Lyall's career, he scored five goals in 105 total appearances.
