= Ian Redford (footballer) =

Scottish footballer and manager

Personal information
- Full name: Ian Petrie Redford
- Date of birth: 5 April 1960
- Place of birth: Perth, Scotland
- Date of death: 10 January 2014 (aged 53)
- Place of death: Irvine, Scotland
- Position: Midfielder

Youth career
- 1975–1976: Errol Rovers

Senior career*
Years	Team	Apps	(Gls)
1976–1980	Dundee	85	(35)
1980–1985	Rangers	172	(23)
1985–1988	Dundee United	101	(20)
1988–1991	Ipswich Town	68	(8)
1991–1993	St Johnstone	44	(5)
1993–1994	Brechin City	44	(3)
1994–1995	Raith Rovers	12	(0)
Total		526	(94)

International career
1980–1982	Scotland U21	6	(0)

Managerial career
- 1993–1994: Brechin City
- * Club domestic league appearances and goals

Ian Petrie Redford (5 April 1960 – 10 January 2014) was a Scottish professional footballer who played as a midfielder or forward. He played for Dundee before joining Rangers for a then Scottish record transfer fee. At Rangers he won in three domestic cup finals. He then joined Dundee United where he scored in the 1987 UEFA Cup semi final win against Borussia Mönchengladbach. He then played for Ipswich Town, St Johnstone and Brechin City (as player manager) before wrapping up his career with two winners medals at Raith Rovers.

== Background ==
Redford grew up on a farm in Perthshire. He became deaf in one ear as a child and hid this fact during his football career. When Redford was 12 his younger brother, Douglas, died of leukemia. He later described this as a turning point in his life.

== Playing career ==
=== Dundee ===
Redford began his career at Errol Rovers, a youth football team set up by his father. From there he joined and came through the youth system at Dundee and made his first appearance for the senior team as a substitute 11 days after his 17th birthday during season 1976/77. Redford played mostly as a forward during his time at Dundee F.C. and is remembered for scoring the goals that clinched the First Division Championship in the 1978/79 season. He was a consistent goal scorer for Dundee with 35 strikes from his 85 league games. He played only six months with Dundee in the top flight. Redford joined Rangers in February 1980 from Dundee for what was then a record fee between two Scottish clubs of £210,000.

=== Rangers ===
He stayed for at Ibrox for six seasons when Rangers won four domestic cup trophies. Redford played in three of these winning finals. In his first season he won the 1981 Scottish Cup Final with a replay victory against Dundee United. Redford played in both games in the final. The season after he won a second medal with victory in the 1981 Scottish League Cup Final. After coming on as a sub against Dundee United he scored what proved be the decisive goal in a 2–1 win. The season after he was runner up in the 1982 Scottish League Cup Final against Celtic. In 1983/84 season Rangers won the 1984 Scottish League Cup Final 3–2 against Celtic. However Redford didn't play in the final. The season after in the 1984 Scottish League Cup Final (October) he collected a winners medal yet again against Dundee United. This time Rangers won 1–0.

In his 172 league games he scored 23 times.

=== Dundee United ===
He joined Jim McLean's Dundee United in summer of 1985. He played for them during one of the club's most successful spells in its history and where he played the games for which he is most remembered. United made it to the 1986/87 UEFA Cup Final. En route they defeated Terry Venables' F.C. Barcelona side featuring Gary Lineker and Mark Hughes at home and away in the quarter-finals. Redford delivered the free kick headed home by John Clark for the 2nd leg equaliser at Camp Nou. This prompted Lineker to prophetically say to one of the United players, 'this mob'll just chuck it,' before United scored a second goal of the game. In the semi-final they eliminated Borussia Mönchengladbach with Redford scoring the second goal in a 2–0 win in Germany. They lost 2–1 in the final over two legs to IFK Gothenburg. In the space of a few days they were also defeated in the 1987 Scottish Cup Final. United were runners up in the same tournament the year after but Redford didn't play in the final.

In his 101 league games at United he scored 20 goals. He was one of four ex-United players inducted into the Dundee United Hall of Fame in 2017.

=== Ipswich Town ===
During 1988–89 season he transferred to Ipswich Town in England. In his 68 league games there he scored 8 times.

=== St Johnstone ===
In summer of 1991 he joined St Johnstone of Perth. In his 44 league games over two seasons he scored five goals.

=== Brechin City ===
In Summer 1993 he became player-manager of Brechin City.

=== Raith Rovers ===
His final club was Raith Rovers who he joined in season 1994–95 Scottish First Division. That season Rovers won the Scottish First Division Championship and the 1994 Scottish League Cup Final. Redford joined the fray in that final as a substitute as the game finished 2–2 after extra time. Redford was scheduled to take Rovers' next penalty when Paul McStay needed to score when 6–5 down on penalties. McStay failed to score meaning Redford's spot kick was no longer necessary. This game on 27 November 1994 was Redford's last as a professional.

== After playing ==
After retiring from football he provided fishing holidays in Perthshire.

His autobiography Raindrops Keep Falling on My Head was published in November 2013.

== Death ==
Redford was found dead on the morning of 10 January 2014 in Irvine, North Ayrshire. His son, Ian junior, described the autobiography published two months before as the longest suicide note in history.

== Honours ==
Dundee

- Scottish First Division: 1978–79

Rangers

- Scottish Cup: 1980–81
- Scottish League Cup: 1980–81, 1984–85; runner-up: 1981–82

Dundee United

- UEFA Cup runner-up: 1986–87

Raith Rovers

- Scottish League Cup: 1994–95
- Scottish First Division: 1994–95
