= 1974–75 in Scottish football =

Division One champions
- Rangers

Division Two champions
- Falkirk

Scottish Cup winners
- Celtic

League Cup winners
- Celtic

Junior Cup winners
- Glenrothes

Teams in Europe
- Celtic, Dundee, Dundee United, Hibernian

Scotland national team
- 1975 BHC, UEFA Euro 1976 qualifying
- ← 1973–74 1975–76 →

The 1974–75 season was the 102nd season of competitive football in Scotland and the 78th season of Scottish league football. At the start of the season, Meadowbank Thistle were admitted to the league, expanding Division Two from 19 to 20 teams. It was the final season of the old, two-division set up. At the end of the season, the top ten teams in Division One formed the new Premier Division. The remaining eight teams, together with the top six from Division Two went on to make up the new First Division. The remaining 14 teams became the new Second Division.

This season also saw Celtic's record-breaking run of nine consecutive league championships come to an end when Rangers won the last Division One league title.

== Scottish League Division One ==
| Pos | Team | Pld | W | D | L | GF | GA | GD | Pts | Qualification |
|---|---|---|---|---|---|---|---|---|---|---|
| 1 | Rangers (C) | 34 | 25 | 6 | 3 | 86 | 33 | +53 | 56 | Qualification to European Cup first round |
| 2 | Hibernian | 34 | 20 | 9 | 5 | 69 | 37 | +32 | 49 | Qualification to UEFA Cup First round |
| 3 | Celtic | 34 | 20 | 5 | 9 | 81 | 41 | +40 | 45 | Qualification to European Cup Winners' Cup First round |
| 4 | Dundee United | 34 | 19 | 7 | 8 | 72 | 43 | +29 | 45 | Qualification to UEFA Cup First round |
| 5 | Aberdeen | 34 | 16 | 9 | 9 | 66 | 43 | +23 | 41 | |
| 6 | Dundee | 34 | 16 | 6 | 12 | 48 | 42 | +6 | 38 | |
| 7 | Ayr United | 34 | 14 | 8 | 12 | 50 | 61 | −11 | 36 | |
| 8 | Hearts | 34 | 11 | 13 | 10 | 47 | 52 | −5 | 35 | |
| 9 | St Johnstone | 34 | 11 | 12 | 11 | 41 | 44 | −3 | 34 | |
| 10 | Motherwell | 34 | 14 | 5 | 15 | 52 | 57 | −5 | 33 | |
| 11 | Airdrieonians | 34 | 11 | 9 | 14 | 43 | 55 | −12 | 31 | Relegation to Scottish First Division |
| 12 | Kilmarnock | 34 | 8 | 15 | 11 | 52 | 68 | −16 | 31 | Relegation to Scottish First Division |
| 13 | Partick Thistle | 34 | 10 | 10 | 14 | 48 | 62 | −14 | 30 | Relegation to Scottish First Division |
| 14 | Dumbarton | 34 | 7 | 10 | 17 | 44 | 55 | −11 | 24 | Relegation to Scottish First Division |
| 15 | Dunfermline Athletic | 34 | 7 | 9 | 18 | 46 | 66 | −20 | 23 | Relegation to Scottish First Division |
| 16 | Clyde | 34 | 6 | 10 | 18 | 40 | 63 | −23 | 22 | Relegation to Scottish First Division |
| 17 | Morton | 34 | 6 | 10 | 18 | 31 | 62 | −31 | 22 | Relegation to Scottish First Division |
| 18 | Arbroath | 34 | 5 | 7 | 22 | 34 | 66 | −32 | 17 | Relegation to Scottish First Division |

Source: Soccerbase and League Tables
(C) Champions

Champions: Rangers
Relegated: See explanation above

== Scottish League Division Two ==
| Pos | Team | Pld | W | D | L | GF | GA | GD | Pts | Promotion or relegation |
|---|---|---|---|---|---|---|---|---|---|---|
| 1 | Falkirk (C) | 38 | 26 | 2 | 10 | 76 | 29 | +47 | 54 | Promotion to the 1975–76 First Division with restructuring |
| 2 | Queen of the South | 38 | 23 | 7 | 8 | 77 | 33 | +44 | 53 | Promotion to the 1975–76 First Division with restructuring |
| 3 | Montrose | 38 | 23 | 7 | 8 | 70 | 37 | +33 | 53 | Promotion to the 1975–76 First Division with restructuring |
| 4 | Hamilton Academical | 38 | 21 | 7 | 10 | 69 | 30 | +39 | 49 | Promotion to the 1975–76 First Division with restructuring |
| 5 | East Fife | 38 | 20 | 7 | 11 | 57 | 42 | +15 | 47 | Promotion to the 1975–76 First Division with restructuring |
| 6 | St Mirren | 38 | 19 | 8 | 11 | 74 | 52 | +22 | 46 | Promotion to the 1975–76 First Division with restructuring |
| 7 | Clydebank | 38 | 18 | 8 | 12 | 50 | 40 | +10 | 44 | |
| 8 | Stirling Albion | 38 | 17 | 9 | 12 | 67 | 55 | +12 | 43 | |
| 9 | Berwick Rangers | 38 | 17 | 6 | 15 | 53 | 49 | +4 | 40 | |
| 10 | East Stirlingshire | 38 | 16 | 8 | 14 | 56 | 52 | +4 | 40 | |
| 11 | Stenhousemuir | 38 | 14 | 11 | 13 | 52 | 42 | +10 | 39 | |
| 12 | Albion Rovers | 38 | 16 | 7 | 15 | 72 | 64 | +8 | 39 | |
| 13 | Raith Rovers | 38 | 14 | 9 | 15 | 48 | 44 | +4 | 37 | |
| 14 | Stranraer | 38 | 12 | 11 | 15 | 47 | 65 | −18 | 35 | |
| 15 | Alloa Athletic | 38 | 11 | 11 | 16 | 49 | 56 | −7 | 33 | |
| 16 | Queen’s Park | 38 | 10 | 10 | 18 | 41 | 54 | −13 | 30 | |
| 17 | Brechin City | 38 | 9 | 7 | 22 | 44 | 85 | −41 | 25 | |
| 18 | Meadowbank Thistle | 38 | 9 | 5 | 24 | 26 | 87 | −61 | 23 | |
| 19 | Cowdenbeath | 38 | 5 | 11 | 22 | 39 | 76 | −37 | 21 | |
| 20 | Forfar Athletic | 38 | 1 | 7 | 30 | 27 | 102 | −75 | 9 | |

Source: "1974-1975 Second Division - SPFL Archive". SPFL.
(C) Champions

Champions: Falkirk
Promotion / relegation: see explanation above

== Cup honours ==
| Competition | Winner | Score | Runner-up |
|---|---|---|---|
| Scottish Cup 1974–75 | Celtic | 3 – 1 | Airdrieonians |
| League Cup 1974–75 | Celtic | 6 – 3 | Hibernian |
| Junior Cup | Glenrothes | 1 – 0 | Rutherglen Glencairn |

== Other honours ==
=== National ===
| Competition | Winner | Score | Runner-up |
|---|---|---|---|
| Scottish Qualifying Cup – North | Peterhead | 3 – 1 * | Elgin City |
| Scottish Qualifying Cup – South | Selkirk | 8 – 2 * | Civil Service Strollers |

=== County ===
| Competition | Winner | Score | Runner-up |
|---|---|---|---|
| Aberdeenshire Cup | Peterhead | | |
| Ayrshire Cup | Ayr United | 1 – 0 | Kilmarnock |
| East of Scotland Shield | Hearts | 2 – 1 | Hibernian |
| Fife Cup | Dunfermline Athletic | 3 – 3 * | East Fife |
| Forfarshire Cup | Dundee United | 3 – 1 | Montrose |
| Glasgow Cup | Celtic | 2 – 2 † | Rangers |
| Lanarkshire Cup | Albion Rovers | 2 – 1 | Motherwell |
| Stirlingshire Cup | Dumbarton | 4 – 1 | Stenhousemuir |

^{*} – aggregate over two legs
† – trophy shared

=== Highland League ===
Top Three
| Pos | Team | Pld | W | D | L | GF | GA | GD | Pts |
|---|---|---|---|---|---|---|---|---|---|
| 1 | Clachnacuddin | 30 | 19 | 8 | 3 | 72 | 32 | +40 | 46 |
| 2 | Keith | 30 | 20 | 5 | 5 | 90 | 41 | +49 | 45 |
| 3 | Fraserburgh | 30 | 18 | 5 | 7 | 86 | 48 | +38 | 41 |

== Individual honours ==
| Award | Winner | Club |
|---|---|---|
| Footballer of the Year | (Scotland) Sandy Jardine | Rangers |

== Scotland national team ==
| Date | Venue | Opponents | Score | Competition | Scotland scorer(s) |
|---|---|---|---|---|---|
| 30 October | Hampden Park, Glasgow (H) | East Germany | 3–0 | Friendly | Tommy Hutchison (pen.), Kenny Burns, Kenny Dalglish |
| 20 November | Hampden Park, Glasgow (H) | Spain | 1–2 | ECQG4 | Billy Bremner |
| 5 February | Estadio Luis Casanova, Valencia (A) | Spain | 1–1 | ECQG4 | Joe Jordan |
| 16 April | Ullevi Stadion, Gothenburg (A) | Sweden | 1–1 | Friendly | Ted MacDougall |
| 13 May | Hampden Park, Glasgow (H) | Portugal | 1–0 | Friendly | own goal |
| 17 May | Ninian Park, Cardiff (A) | Wales | 2–2 | BHC | Colin Jackson, Bruce Rioch |
| 20 May | Hampden Park, Glasgow (H) | Northern Ireland | 3–0 | BHC | Ted MacDougall, Kenny Dalglish, Derek Parlane |
| 24 May | Wembley Stadium, London (A) | England | 1–5 | BHC | Bruce Rioch |
| 1 June | Stadionul 23. August, Bucharest (A) | Romania | 1–1 | ECQG4 | Gordon McQueen |

1975 British Home Championship – Runner Up

Key:

- (H) = Home match
- (A) = Away match
- ECQG4 = European Championship qualifying – Group 4
- BHC = British Home Championship
