= 1981–82 in Scottish football =

Premier Division champions
- Celtic

Division One champions
- Motherwell

Division Two champions
- Clyde

Scottish Cup winners
- Aberdeen

League Cup winners
- Rangers

Junior Cup winners
- Blantyre Victoria

Teams in Europe
- Aberdeen, Celtic, Dundee United, Rangers

Scotland national team
- 1982 BHC, 1982 World Cup qualification, 1982 World Cup
- ← 1980–81 1982–83 →

The 1981–82 season was the 85th season of Scottish league football.

== Scottish Premier Division ==
Pos	Team	Pld	W	D	L	GF	GA	GD	Pts	Qualification or relegation
1	Celtic (C)	36	24	7	5	79	33	+46	55	Qualification for the European Cup first round
2	Aberdeen	36	23	7	6	71	29	+42	53	Qualification for the Cup Winners' Cup first round
3	Rangers	36	16	11	9	57	45	+12	43	Qualification for the UEFA Cup first round
4	Dundee United	36	15	10	11	61	38	+23	40	Qualification for the UEFA Cup first round
5	St Mirren	36	14	9	13	49	52	−3	37	
6	Hibernian	36	11	14	11	38	40	−2	36	
7	Morton	36	9	12	15	31	54	−23	30	
8	Dundee	36	11	4	21	46	72	−26	26	
9	Partick Thistle (R)	36	6	10	20	35	59	−24	22	Relegation to the 1982–83 Scottish First Division
10	Airdrieonians (R)	36	5	8	23	31	76	−45	18	Relegation to the 1982–83 Scottish First Division

Source: Statto
Rules for classification: 1) points; 2) goal difference; 3) number of goals scored.
(C) Champions; (R) Relegated

Champions: Celtic
Relegated: Partick Thistle, Airdrieonians

== Scottish League Division One ==
Pos	Team	Pld	W	D	L	GF	GA	GD	Pts	Promotion or relegation
1	Motherwell (C, P)	39	26	9	4	92	36	+56	61	Promotion to the Premier Division
2	Kilmarnock (P)	39	17	17	5	60	29	+31	51	Promotion to the Premier Division
3	Heart of Midlothian	39	21	8	10	65	37	+28	50	
4	Clydebank	39	19	8	12	61	53	+8	46	
5	St Johnstone	39	17	8	14	69	60	+9	42	
6	Ayr United	39	15	12	12	56	50	+6	42	
7	Hamilton Academical	39	16	8	15	52	49	+3	40	
8	Queen's Park	39	13	10	16	41	41	0	36	
9	Falkirk	39	11	14	14	49	52	−3	36	
10	Dunfermline Athletic	39	11	14	14	46	56	−10	36	
11	Dumbarton	39	13	9	17	49	61	−12	35	
12	Raith Rovers	39	11	7	21	31	59	−28	29	
13	East Stirlingshire (R)	39	7	10	22	38	77	−39	24	Relegation to the Second Division
14	Queen of the South (R)	39	4	10	25	44	93	−49	18	Relegation to the Second Division

Source: RSSSF
Rules for classification: 1) points; 2) goal difference; 3) number of goals scored.
(C) Champions; (P) Promoted; (R) Relegated

Promoted: Motherwell, Kilmarnock
Relegated: East Stirlingshire, Queen of the South

== Scottish League Division Two ==
Pos	Team	Pld	W	D	L	GF	GA	GD	Pts	Promotion
1	Clyde (C, P)	39	24	11	4	79	38	+41	59	Promotion to the First Division
2	Alloa Athletic (P)	39	19	12	8	66	42	+24	50	Promotion to the First Division
3	Arbroath	39	20	10	9	62	50	+12	50	
4	Berwick Rangers	39	20	8	11	66	38	+28	48	
5	Brechin City	39	18	10	11	61	43	+18	46	
6	Forfar Athletic	39	15	15	9	59	35	+24	45	
7	East Fife	39	14	9	16	48	51	−3	37	
8	Stirling Albion	39	12	11	16	39	44	−5	35	
9	Cowdenbeath	39	11	13	15	51	57	−6	35	
10	Montrose	39	12	8	19	49	74	−25	32	
11	Albion Rovers	39	13	5	21	52	74	−22	31	
12	Meadowbank Thistle	39	10	10	19	49	62	−13	30	
13	Stenhousemuir	39	11	6	22	41	65	−24	28	
14	Stranraer	39	7	6	26	36	85	−49	20	

Source: "1981-1982 Second Division - SPFL Archive". SPFL.
Rules for classification: 1) points; 2) goal difference; 3) number of goals scored.
(C) Champions; (P) Promoted

Promoted: Clyde, Alloa Athletic

== Other honours ==
=== Cup honours ===
Competition	Winner	Score	Runner-up
Scottish Cup 1981–82	Aberdeen	4 – 1 (a.e.t.)	Rangers
League Cup 1981–82	Rangers	2 – 1	Dundee United
Junior Cup	Blantyre Victoria	1 – 0	Baillieston Juniors

=== Individual honours ===
Award	Winner	Club
Footballer of the Year	(Scotland) Paul Sturrock	Dundee United
Players' Player of the Year	(Scotland) Sandy Clark	Airdrieonians
Young Player of the Year	(Scotland) Frank McAvennie	St Mirren

== Scottish national team ==
Date	Venue	Opponents	Score (Note: Scotland's score is shown first.)	Competition	Scotland scorer(s)
9 September 1981	Hampden Park, Glasgow (H)	Sweden	2–0	WCQG6	Joe Jordan, John Robertson (pen.)
14 October 1981	Windsor Park, Belfast (A)	Northern Ireland	0–0	WCQG6	
18 November 1981	Estadio da Luz, Lisbon (A)	Portugal	1–2	WCQG6	Paul Sturrock
24 February 1982	Estadio Luis Casanova, Valencia (A)	Spain	0–3	Friendly	
23 March 1982	Hampden Park, Glasgow (H)	Netherlands	2–1	Friendly	Frank Gray (pen.), Kenny Dalglish
28 April 1982	Windsor Park, Belfast (A)	Northern Ireland	1–1	BHC	John Wark
24 May 1982	Hampden Park, Glasgow (H)	Wales	1–0	BHC	Asa Hartford
29 May 1982	Hampden Park, Glasgow (H)	England	0–1	BHC	
15 June 1982	Estadio La Rosaleda, Málaga (N)	New Zealand	5–2	WCG6	John Wark (2), John Robertson, Kenny Dalglish, Steve Archibald
18 June 1982	Estadio Sanchez Pizjuan, Seville (N)	Brazil	1–4	WCG6	David Narey
22 June 1982	Estadio La Rosaleda, Málaga (N)	(Soviet Union) USSR	2–2	WCG6	Joe Jordan, Graeme Souness

Key:

- (H) = Home match
- (A) = Away match
- WCQG6 = World Cup qualifying – Group 6
- WCG6 = World Cup – Group 6
- BHC = British Home Championship

== See also ==
1981–82 Aberdeen F.C. season
