= 1983–84 in Scottish football =

Premier Division champions
- Aberdeen

Division One champions
- Morton

Division Two champions
- Forfar Athletic

Scottish Cup winners
- Aberdeen

League Cup winners
- Rangers

Junior Cup winners
- Bo'ness United

Teams in Europe
- Aberdeen, Celtic, Dundee United, Rangers, St Mirren

Scotland national team
- 1984 BHC, UEFA Euro 1984 qualifying
- ← 1982–83 1984–85 →

The 1983–84 season was the 87th season of competitive football in Scotland.

== Scottish Premier Division ==
Pos	Team	Pld	W	D	L	GF	GA	GD	Pts	Qualification or relegation
1	Aberdeen (C)	36	25	7	4	78	21	+57	57	Qualification for the European Cup first round
2	Celtic	36	21	8	7	80	41	+39	50	Qualification for the Cup Winners' Cup first round
3	Dundee United	36	18	11	7	67	39	+28	47	Qualification for the UEFA Cup first round
4	Rangers	36	15	12	9	53	41	+12	42	Qualification for the UEFA Cup first round
5	Heart of Midlothian	36	10	16	10	38	47	−9	36	Qualification for the UEFA Cup first round
6	St Mirren	36	9	14	13	55	59	−4	32	
7	Hibernian	36	12	7	17	45	55	−10	31	
8	Dundee	36	11	5	20	50	74	−24	27	
9	St Johnstone (R)	36	10	3	23	36	81	−45	23	Relegation to the 1984–85 Scottish First Division
10	Motherwell (R)	36	4	7	25	31	75	−44	15	Relegation to the 1984–85 Scottish First Division

Source: Statto
Rules for classification: 1) points; 2) goal difference; 3) number of goals scored.
(C) Champions; (R) Relegated

Champions: Aberdeen
Relegated: St. Johnstone, Motherwell

== Scottish League Division One ==
Pos	Team	Pld	W	D	L	GF	GA	GD	Pts	Promotion or relegation
1	Morton (C, P)	39	21	12	6	75	46	+29	54	Promotion to the Premier Division
2	Dumbarton (P)	39	20	11	8	66	44	+22	51	Promotion to the Premier Division
3	Partick Thistle	39	19	8	12	67	50	+17	46	
4	Clydebank	39	16	13	10	62	50	+12	45	
5	Brechin City	39	14	14	11	56	58	−2	42	
6	Kilmarnock	39	16	6	17	57	53	+4	38	
7	Falkirk	39	16	6	17	46	54	−8	38	
8	Clyde	39	12	13	14	53	50	+3	37	
9	Hamilton Academical	39	11	14	14	43	46	−3	36	
10	Airdrieonians	39	13	10	16	45	53	−8	36	
11	Meadowbank Thistle	39	12	10	17	49	69	−20	34	
12	Ayr United	39	10	12	17	56	70	−14	32	
13	Raith Rovers (R)	39	10	11	18	53	62	−9	31	Relegation to the Second Division
14	Alloa Athletic (R)	39	8	10	21	41	64	−23	26	Relegation to the Second Division

Source: RSSSF and statto
Rules for classification: 1) points; 2) goal difference; 3) number of goals scored.
(C) Champions; (P) Promoted; (R) Relegated

Promoted: Morton, Dumbarton
Relegated: Raith Rovers, Alloa Athletic

== Scottish League Division Two ==
Pos	Team	Pld	W	D	L	GF	GA	GD	Pts	Promotion
1	Forfar Athletic (C, P)	39	27	9	3	73	31	+42	63	Promotion to the First Division
2	East Fife (P)	39	20	7	12	57	43	+14	47	Promotion to the First Division
3	Berwick Rangers	39	16	11	12	56	38	+18	43	
4	Stirling Albion	39	14	14	11	51	41	+10	42	
5	Arbroath	39	18	6	15	51	46	+5	42	
6	Queen of the South	39	16	10	13	51	46	+5	42	
7	Stenhousemuir	39	14	11	14	47	57	−10	39	
8	Stranraer	39	13	12	14	47	47	0	38	
9	Dunfermline Athletic	39	13	10	16	44	45	−1	36	
10	Queen's Park	39	14	8	17	58	63	−5	36	
11	East Stirlingshire	39	10	11	18	52	66	−14	31	
12	Montrose	39	12	7	20	36	56	−20	31	
13	Cowdenbeath	39	10	9	20	44	58	−14	29	
14	Albion Rovers	39	8	11	20	46	76	−30	27	

Source: "1983-1984 Second Division - SPFL Archive". SPFL.
Rules for classification: 1) points; 2) goal difference; 3) number of goals scored.
(C) Champions; (P) Promoted

Promoted: Forfar Athletic, East Fife

== Other honours ==
=== Cup honours ===
Competition	Winner	Score	Runner-up	Report
Scottish Cup 1983–84	Aberdeen	2 – 1 (a.e.t.)	Celtic	Wikipedia article
League Cup 1983–84	Rangers	3 – 2 (a.e.t.)	Celtic	Wikipedia article
Youth Cup	Celtic	2 – 0 (a.e.t.)	Rangers	
Junior Cup	Bo'ness United	2 – 0	Baillieston Juniors	

=== Individual honours ===
Award	Winner	Club
Footballer of the Year	(Scotland) Willie Miller	Aberdeen
Players' Player of the Year	(Scotland) Willie Miller	Aberdeen
Young Player of the Year	(Scotland) John Robertson	Heart of Midlothian

== Scottish national team ==
Date	Venue	Opponents	Score	Competition	Scotland scorer(s)
21 September 1983	Hampden Park, Glasgow (H)	Uruguay	2–0	Friendly	John Robertson, Davie Dodds
12 October 1983	Hampden Park, Glasgow (H)	Belgium	1–1	ECQG1	Charlie Nicholas
16 November 1983	Kurt-Wabbel Stadion, Halle (A)	East Germany	1–2	ECQG1	Eamonn Bannon
13 December 1983	Windsor Park, Belfast (A)	Northern Ireland	0–2	BHC	
28 February 1984	Hampden Park, Glasgow (H)	Wales	2–1	BHC	Davie Cooper, Maurice Johnston
26 May 1984	Hampden Park, Glasgow (H)	England	1–1	BHC	Mark McGhee
1 June 1984	Stade Vélodrome, Marseille (A)	France	0–2	Friendly	

Key:

- (H) = Home match
- (A) = Away match
- ECQG1 = European Championship qualifying - Group 1
- BHC = British Home Championship

== See also ==
1983–84 Aberdeen F.C. season
