= Gregor Stevens =

Scottish footballer

Personal information
- Full name: Gregor MacKenzie Stevens
- Date of birth: 13 January 1955 (age 71)
- Place of birth: Glasgow, Scotland
- Height: 1.80 m (5 ft 11 in)
- Position: Defender

Senior career*
Years	Team	Apps	(Gls)
1974–1979	Motherwell	139	(19)
1979	Leicester City	4	(0)
1980–1984	Rangers	92	(1)
1984	Hearts	3	(0)
1984–1985	Motherwell	8	(0)
1985–1986	Partick Thistle	3	(0)
1986–1990	Brechin City	95	(0)
1990	Dumbarton	8	(0)

International career
1978	Scottish League XI	2	(0)
- * Club domestic league appearances and goals

Gregor MacKenzie Stevens (born 13 January 1955 in Drumchapel, Glasgow) is a Scottish former professional footballer, who played during the 1970s and 1980s.

Stevens started his career at Motherwell in 1974 and moved to Leicester City in 1979 for a fee of £165,000. But he was to stay there for only four months before being brought back to Scotland by Rangers manager John Greig who paid City £150,000 for his services.

Stevens' Rangers debut came on 6 September 1979 as a sub in a 4-2 win at Dundee United. He went on to make 92 appearances and scored four goals.
