= Ally Dawson =

Scottish footballer and manager (1958–2021)

Personal information
- Full name: Alistair John Dawson
- Date of birth: 25 February 1958
- Place of birth: Johnstone, Scotland
- Date of death: 26 July 2021 (aged 63)
- Place of death: Johnstone, Scotland
- Position: Defender

Senior career*
Years	Team	Apps	(Gls)
1975–1987	Rangers	218	(6)
1987–1990	Blackburn Rovers	40	(0)
1990–1991	Limerick	3	(0)
1990–1991	Airdrieonians	10	(1)
1991–1992	St. Andrews	6	(0)
1993–1995	Dingli Swallows	14	(3)
Total		277	(7)

International career
1980–1983	Scotland	5	(0)

Managerial career
- 1991–1992: St. Andrews
- 1999–2002: Hamilton Academical
- * Club domestic league appearances and goals

Alistair John Dawson (25 February 1958 – 26 July 2021) was a Scottish professional footballer who played as a defender. He spent most of his career at Rangers.

In 2011, Dawson was inducted into Rangers' Hall of Fame.

== Playing career ==
Dawson was signed as a sixteen-year-old in 1975 by manager Jock Wallace Jr. and made his debut in a pre-season tour in Canada. He was a full back who could play on either side of the pitch.

He sustained a serious injury during a club tour of Canada, when he fractured his skull. He recovered, and became a centre back. He made a total of 316 appearances for Rangers, scoring eight goals. He received two Scottish Cup winner's medals, in 1979 and 1981, and four League Cup winner's medals – in 1979, 1984, 1985 and 1987. He was capped five times by Scotland, all while at Rangers.

After 12 years at the club, Dawson left Rangers for Blackburn Rovers in 1987 for £25,000, equivalent to £72,316 in 2025. He signed for Limerick in 1990 and returned to Scotland later that season with Airdrie, before becoming player/manager of Maltese league club Luxol St. Andrews. He later also played for Dingli Swallows, another Maltese team, in their historic 1994/1995 season in First Division.

== Managerial career ==
Dawson went on to manage Hamilton Academical for a three-year spell between 1999 and 2003 where he won the Scottish Third Division title.

== Death ==
Dawson died on 26 July 2021, aged 63.

== Honours ==
=== As manager ===
Hamilton Academical

- Scottish Third Division: 2000–01
