= Jim Stewart (Scottish footballer) =

Scottish footballer

Personal information
- Full name: James Garvin Stewart
- Date of birth: 9 March 1954 (age 72)
- Place of birth: Kilwinning, Scotland
- Position: Goalkeeper

Youth career
- 1970–1971: Troon

Senior career*
| Years | Team | Apps | (Gls) |
| 1972–1977 | Kilmarnock | 136 | (0) |
| 1977–1980 | Middlesbrough | 34 | (0) |
| 1980–1984 | Rangers | 55 | (0) |
| 1983 | → Dumbarton (loan) | 2 | (0) |
| 1984–1986 | St Mirren | 9 | (0) |
| 1986 | Partick Thistle | 8 | (0) |
| Total | | 244 | (0) |

International career
| 1974–1978 | Scottish League XI | 3 | (0) |
| 1977–1978 | Scotland | 2 | (0) |
- * Club domestic league appearances and goals

James Garvin Stewart (born 9 March 1954) is a Scottish former football goalkeeper.

== Football career ==
=== Playing ===
He began his career with local side Troon, and he went on to play for Kilmarnock, Middlesbrough, Rangers, St Mirren and Partick Thistle. Stewart earned 2 caps for Scotland and was included in the squad at the 1974 FIFA World Cup.

=== Coaching ===
He was later the goalkeeping coach at Kilmarnock and Heart of Midlothian, who he left to rejoin Rangers in August 2007. He worked with the SFA as a youth goalkeeping coach before joined the Scotland national football team setup under Gordon Strachan in 2013, on a part-time basis. Stewart left Rangers in March 2017, following the appointment of Pedro Caixinha as team manager. He was then the goalkeeping coach at Nottingham Forest from May 2017 to January 2018.

== Personal life ==
His son Colin also played as a goalkeeper for Kilmarnock, and daughter-in-law Julie Fleeting is the all-time leading scorer for the Scotland women's national football team.
