= John McClelland (footballer, born 1955) =

Northern Irish footballer (born 1955)

Personal information
- Full name: John McClelland
- Date of birth: 7 December 1955 (age 70)
- Place of birth: Belfast, Northern Ireland
- Height: 6 ft 2 in (1.88 m)
- Position: Defender

Senior career*
Years	Team	Apps	(Gls)
	Portadown	?	(?)
1974	Cardiff City	4	(1)
1974–1978	Bangor City	?	(?)
1978–1981	Mansfield Town	125	(8)
1981–1984	Rangers	96	(4)
1984–1989	Watford	184	(3)
1989–1992	Leeds United	24	(0)
1990	→ Watford (loan)	1	(0)
1992	→ Notts County (loan)	6	(0)
1992–1993	St Johnstone	27	(0)
1993	Arbroath	2	(0)
1993–1994	Carrick Rangers	11	(0)
1994	Wycombe Wanderers	0	(0)
1994–1996	Yeovil Town	21	(1)
1996–1997	Darlington	1	(0)
Total		502	(16)

International career
1980–1990	Northern Ireland	53	(1)

Managerial career
- 1992–1993: St Johnstone
- * Club domestic league appearances and goals

John McClelland (born 7 December 1955) is a former Northern Ireland international footballer who played for several teams during a 23-year career. He worked for Leeds United as part of the tour groups for Elland Road.

== Club career ==
McClelland played for Portadown, Cardiff City, Bangor City (he was Welsh Cup runner up with both of these clubs), and Mansfield Town, before signing for Rangers for £90,000 in June 1981. There he won two Scottish League Cup winner's medals, and was twice a Scottish Cup runner up.

In November 1984 Watford paid £225,000 for his services. During his five years at Vicarage Road he was voted Watford Player of the Season twice. He later played for Leeds United, where he played 18 times as Leeds won the Football League First Division title in the 1991–92 season, the last season before the formation of the Premier League. During his time at Leeds he spent time on loan at old club Watford and Notts County.

In his later career he spent a season at St Johnstone as player manager, had a brief spell in the Irish League with Carrick Rangers, before playing for Arbroath, Wycombe Wanderers, Yeovil Town and Darlington. By the time he retired he had played in every country in the United Kingdom and in every tier of English football.

== International career ==
At international level McClelland was also successful. He played for Northern Ireland at the 1982 and 1986 World Cups. He eventually won 53 caps, scoring one goal in a win over Turkey. He was also captain of Northern Ireland from after the 1986 World Cup until his retirement in 1990.

=== International goals ===
Scores and results list Northern Ireland's goal tally first.

#	Date	Venue	Opponent	Score	Result	Competition
1	30 March 1983	Belfast, Northern Ireland	Turkey	2–0	2–1	UEFA Euro 1984 qualifying

== Post-football ==
He was player-manager at St Johnstone in the early 1990s. For a brief time after retirement McClelland could be found working at Leeds United taking tour groups around Elland Road. He is now a postman in the Wakefield area.

== Honours ==
=== Player ===
Rangers

- Scottish League Cup: 1983–84, 1984–85

Leeds United

- Football League First Division: 1991–92

=== Manager ===
St Johnstone

- Forfarshire Cup: 1992-93
