= 1981–82 Scottish League Cup =

Tournament details
- Country: Scotland

Final positions
- Champions: Rangers
- Runners-up: Dundee United

Tournament statistics
- Top goal scorer: Gordon Strachan (6)

The 1981–82 Scottish League Cup was the thirty-sixth season of Scotland's second football knockout competition. The competition was won by Rangers, who defeated Dundee United in the Final.

== First round ==
=== Group 1 ===
Team	Pld	W	D	L	GF	GA	GD	Pts
St Mirren	6	4	1	1	10	8	+2	9
Celtic	6	4	0	2	18	9	+9	8
St Johnstone	6	2	0	4	8	12	−4	4
Hibernian	6	1	1	4	5	12	−7	3

Home team	Score	Away team	Date
Celtic	1–3	St Mirren	8 August 1981
Hibernian	1–2	St Johnstone	8 August 1981
St Johnstone	2–0	Celtic	12 August 1981
St Mirren	0–0	Hibernian	12 August 1981
Celtic	4–1	Hibernian	15 August 1981
St Johnstone	2–3	St Mirren	15 August 1981
Celtic	4–1	St Johnstone	19 August 1981
Hibernian	0–1	St Mirren	19 August 1981
St Johnstone	1–2	Hibernian	22 August 1981
St Mirren	1–5	Celtic	22 August 1981
Hibernian	1–4	Celtic	26 August 1981
St Mirren	2–0	St Johnstone	26 August 1981

=== Group 2 ===
Team	Pld	W	D	L	GF	GA	GD	Pts
Rangers	6	5	1	0	19	5	+14	11
Morton	6	4	1	1	13	7	+6	9
Raith Rovers	6	1	1	4	7	20	−13	3
Dundee	6	0	1	5	7	14	−7	1

Home team	Score	Away team	Date
Dundee	1–2	Raith Rovers	8 August 1981
Morton	1–1	Rangers	8 August 1981
Raith Rovers	2–5	Morton	12 August 1981
Rangers	4–1	Dundee	12 August 1981
Dundee	1–2	Morton	15 August 1981
Rangers	8–1	Raith Rovers	15 August 1981
Dundee	1–2	Rangers	19 August 1981
Morton	2–0	Raith Rovers	19 August 1981
Raith Rovers	1–1	Dundee	22 August 1981
Rangers	1–0	Morton	22 August 1981
Morton	3–2	Dundee	26 August 1981
Raith Rovers	1–3	Rangers	26 August 1981

=== Group 3 ===
Team	Pld	W	D	L	GF	GA	GD	Pts
Aberdeen	6	4	1	1	12	1	+11	9
Kilmarnock	6	2	2	2	5	8	−3	6
Heart of Midlothian	6	2	1	3	5	9	−4	5
Airdrieonians	6	1	2	3	4	8	−4	4

Home team	Score	Away team	Date
Aberdeen	3–0	Kilmarnock	8 August 1981
Airdrieonians	0–1	Heart of Midlothian	8 August 1981
Heart of Midlothian	1–0	Aberdeen	12 August 1981
Kilmarnock	1–1	Airdrieonians	12 August 1981
Aberdeen	3–0	Airdrieonians	15 August 1981
Heart of Midlothian	1–1	Kilmarnock	15 August 1981
Aberdeen	3–0	Heart of Midlothian	19 August 1981
Airdrieonians	0–1	Kilmarnock	19 August 1981
Heart of Midlothian	2–3	Airdrieonians	22 August 1981
Kilmarnock	0–3	Aberdeen	22 August 1981
Airdrieonians	0–0	Aberdeen	26 August 1981
Kilmarnock	2–0	Heart of Midlothian	26 August 1981

=== Group 4 ===
Team	Pld	W	D	L	GF	GA	GD	Pts
Dundee United	6	5	1	0	13	7	+6	11
Ayr United	6	4	0	2	14	9	+5	8
Partick Thistle	6	2	0	4	5	10	−5	4
Motherwell	6	0	1	5	4	10	−6	1

Home team	Score	Away team	Date
Ayr United	3–4	Dundee United	8 August 1981
Partick Thistle	2–0	Motherwell	8 August 1981
Dundee United	2–0	Partick Thistle	12 August 1981
Motherwell	2–3	Ayr United	12 August 1981
Ayr United	1–0	Partick Thistle	15 August 1981
Motherwell	1–2	Dundee United	15 August 1981
Ayr United	1–0	Motherwell	19 August 1981
Partick Thistle	1–2	Dundee United	19 August 1981
Dundee United	2–1	Ayr United	22 August 1981
Motherwell	0–1	Partick Thistle	22 August 1981
Dundee United	1–1	Motherwell	26 August 1981
Partick Thistle	1–5	Ayr United	26 August 1981

=== Group 5 ===
Team	Pld	W	D	L	GF	GA	GD	Pts
Brechin City	6	4	0	2	11	9	+2	8
Queen of the South	6	3	1	2	10	10	0	7
Cowdenbeath	6	2	1	3	9	9	0	5
Dumbarton	6	2	0	4	8	10	−2	4

Home team	Score	Away team	Date
Cowdenbeath	2–0	Dumbarton	8 August 1981
Queen of the South	1–3	Brechin City	8 August 1981
Brechin City	2–0	Cowdenbeath	12 August 1981
Dumbarton	1–0	Queen of the South	12 August 1981
Brechin City	2–1	Dumbarton	15 August 1981
Cowdenbeath	1–2	Queen of the South	15 August 1981
Cowdenbeath	4–0	Brechin City	19 August 1981
Queen of the South	3–2	Dumbarton	19 August 1981
Brechin City	1–2	Queen of the South	22 August 1981
Dumbarton	3–0	Cowdenbeath	22 August 1981
Dumbarton	1–3	Brechin City	26 August 1981
Queen of the South	2–2	Cowdenbeath	26 August 1981

=== Group 6 ===
Team	Pld	W	D	L	GF	GA	GD	Pts
Forfar Athletic	6	5	0	1	11	4	+7	10
Falkirk	6	3	2	1	11	5	+6	8
Alloa Athletic	6	1	2	3	8	15	−7	4
Stirling Albion	6	0	2	4	6	12	−6	2

Home team	Score	Away team	Date
Falkirk	4–1	Stirling Albion	8 August 1981
Forfar Athletic	4–1	Alloa Athletic	8 August 1981
Alloa Athletic	1–1	Falkirk	12 August 1981
Stirling Albion	0–1	Forfar Athletic	12 August 1981
Alloa Athletic	4–3	Stirling Albion	15 August 1981
Falkirk	1–0	Forfar Athletic	15 August 1981
Falkirk	3–0	Alloa Athletic	19 August 1981
Forfar Athletic	1–0	Stirling Albion	19 August 1981
Alloa Athletic	0–2	Forfar Athletic	22 August 1981
Stirling Albion	0–0	Falkirk	22 August 1981
Forfar Athletic	3–2	Falkirk	26 August 1981
Stirling Albion	2–2	Alloa Athletic	26 August 1981

=== Group 7 ===
Team	Pld	W	D	L	GF	GA	GD	Pts
Berwick Rangers	6	3	2	1	12	8	+4	8
Queen's Park	6	4	0	2	8	7	+1	8
Clydebank	6	2	1	3	8	10	−2	5
Clyde	6	1	1	4	6	9	−3	3

Home team	Score	Away team	Date
Berwick Rangers	2–1	Clyde	8 August 1981
Queen's Park	1–0	Clydebank	8 August 1981
Clyde	0–3	Queen's Park	12 August 1981
Clydebank	2–2	Berwick Rangers	12 August 1981
Clyde	3–0	Clydebank	15 August 1981
Queen's Park	2–0	Berwick Rangers	15 August 1981
Berwick Rangers	3–1	Clydebank	19 August 1981
Queen's Park	1–0	Clyde	19 August 1981
Clyde	2–2	Berwick Rangers	22 August 1981
Clydebank	4–1	Queen's Park	22 August 1981
Berwick Rangers	3–0	Queen's Park	26 August 1981
Clydebank	1–0	Clyde	26 August 1981

=== Group 8 ===
Team	Pld	W	D	L	GF	GA	GD	Pts
Hamilton Academical	6	6	0	0	14	5	+9	12
Dunfermline Ath	6	4	0	2	8	7	+1	8
Montrose	6	2	0	4	7	10	−3	4
East Stirlingshire	6	0	0	6	2	9	−7	0

Home team	Score	Away team	Date
Hamilton Academical	2–0	Dunfermline Ath	8 August 1981
Montrose	1–0	East Stirlingshire	8 August 1981
Dunfermline Ath	2–1	Montrose	12 August 1981
East Stirlingshire	0–2	Hamilton Academical	12 August 1981
Dunfermline Ath	2–1	East Stirlingshire	15 August 1981
Montrose	1–2	Hamilton Academical	15 August 1981
Hamilton Academical	1–0	East Stirlingshire	19 August 1981
Montrose	0–1	Dunfermline Ath	19 August 1981
Dunfermline Ath	2–3	Hamilton Academical	22 August 1981
East Stirlingshire	1–2	Montrose	22 August 1981
East Stirlingshire	0–1	Dunfermline Ath	26 August 1981
Hamilton Academical	4–2	Montrose	26 August 1981

=== Group 9 ===
Team	Pld	W	D	L	GF	GA	GD	Pts
Arbroath	5	4	1	0	15	2	+13	9
East Fife	5	2	2	1	8	6	+2	6
Meadowbank Thistle	5	2	2	1	7	7	0	6
Albion Rovers	5	1	2	2	8	11	−3	4
Stranraer	5	2	0	3	7	11	−4	4
Stenhousemuir	5	0	1	4	7	15	−8	1

Home team	Score	Away team	Date
Arbroath	3–0	Stenhousemuir	8 August 1981
Meadowbank Thistle	2–2	Albion Rovers	8 August 1981
Stranraer	1–3	East Fife	8 August 1981
Meadowbank Thistle	1–3	Arbroath	12 August 1981
Stenhousemuir	2–3	Stranraer	12 August 1981
Albion Rovers	1–1	East Fife	13 August 1981
Albion Rovers	5–2	Stenhousemuir	15 August 1981
Arbroath	4–0	Stranraer	15 August 1981
East Fife	0–1	Meadowbank Thistle	15 August 1981
East Fife	1–1	Arbroath	19 August 1981
Meadowbank Thistle	1–1	Stenhousemuir	19 August 1981
Stranraer	2–0	Albion Rovers	19 August 1981
Arbroath	4–0	Albion Rovers	22 August 1981
Stenhousemuir	2–3	East Fife	22 August 1981
Stranraer	1–2	Meadowbank Thistle	22 August 1981

== Supplementary round ==
=== First leg ===
Home team	Score	Away team	Date
Arbroath	1–2	Forfar Athletic	31 August 1981

=== Second leg ===
Home team	Score	Away team	Date	Agg
Forfar Athletic	2–2	Arbroath	2 September 1981	4–3

== Quarter-finals ==
=== First leg ===
Home team	Score	Away team	Date
Aberdeen	5–0	Berwick Rangers	2 September 1981
Brechin City	0–4	Rangers	2 September 1981
Forfar Athletic	1–1	St Mirren	16 September 1981
Hamilton Academical	0–4	Dundee United	2 September 1981

=== Second leg ===
Home team	Score	Away team	Date	Agg
Berwick Rangers	0–3	Aberdeen	23 September 1981	0–8
Dundee United	5–0	Hamilton Academical	23 September 1981	9–0
Rangers	1–0	Brechin City	23 September 1981	5–0
St Mirren	6–0	Forfar Athletic	23 September 1981	7–1

== Semi-finals ==
=== First leg ===
Home team	Score	Away team	Date
Dundee United	0–1	Aberdeen	7 October 1981
St Mirren	2–2	Rangers	7 October 1981

=== Second leg ===
Home team	Score	Away team	Date	Agg
Aberdeen	0–3	Dundee United	28 October 1981	1–3
Rangers	2–1	St Mirren	28 October 1981	4–3

== Final ==
28 November 1981

Dundee United	1–2	Rangers
Milne		Cooper; Redford

Hampden Park, Glasgow
Attendance: 53,777
