= 1984–85 in Scottish football =

Season in Scottish football

Premier Division champions
- Aberdeen

Division One champions
- Motherwell

Division Two champions
- Montrose

Scottish Cup winners
- Celtic

League Cup winners
- Rangers

Junior Cup winners
- Pollok

Teams in Europe
- Aberdeen, Celtic, Dundee United, Heart of Midlothian, Rangers

Scotland national team
- 1986 World Cup qualification, Rous Cup
- ← 1983–84 1985–86 →

The 1984–85 season was the 88th season of competitive football in Scotland. As of 2026, this is the last time a club other than Rangers or Celtic won the Scottish Premier title.

== Scottish Premier Division ==
Pos	Team	Pld	W	D	L	GF	GA	GD	Pts	Qualification or relegation
1	Aberdeen (C)	36	27	5	4	89	26	+63	59	Qualification for the European Cup first round
2	Celtic	36	22	8	6	77	30	+47	52	Qualification for the Cup Winners' Cup first round
3	Dundee United	36	20	7	9	67	33	+34	47	Qualification for the UEFA Cup first round
4	Rangers	36	13	12	11	47	38	+9	38	Qualification for the UEFA Cup first round
5	St Mirren	36	17	4	15	51	56	−5	38	Qualification for the UEFA Cup first round
6	Dundee	36	15	7	14	48	50	−2	37	
7	Heart of Midlothian	36	13	5	18	47	64	−17	31	
8	Hibernian	36	10	7	19	38	61	−23	27	
9	Dumbarton (R)	36	6	7	23	29	64	−35	19	Relegation to the 1985–86 Scottish First Division
10	Morton (R)	36	5	2	29	29	100	−71	12	Relegation to the 1985–86 Scottish First Division

Source: Statto
Rules for classification: 1) points; 2) goal difference; 3) number of goals scored.
(C) Champions; (R) Relegated

Champions: Aberdeen
Relegated: Dumbarton, Morton.

== Scottish League Division One ==
Pos	Team	Pld	W	D	L	GF	GA	GD	Pts	Promotion or relegation
1	Motherwell (C, P)	39	21	8	10	62	26	+36	50	Promotion to the Premier Division
2	Clydebank (P)	39	17	14	8	57	37	+20	48	Promotion to the Premier Division
3	Falkirk	39	19	7	13	65	54	+11	45	
4	Hamilton Academical	39	16	11	12	48	49	−1	43	
5	Airdrieonians	39	17	8	14	70	59	+11	42	
6	Forfar Athletic	39	14	13	12	54	49	+5	41	
7	Ayr United	39	15	9	15	57	52	+5	39	
8	Clyde	39	14	11	14	47	48	−1	39	
9	Brechin City	39	14	9	16	49	57	−8	37	
10	East Fife	39	12	12	15	55	56	−1	36	
11	Partick Thistle	39	13	9	17	50	55	−5	35	
12	Kilmarnock	39	12	10	17	42	61	−19	34	
13	Meadowbank Thistle (R)	39	11	10	18	50	66	−16	32	Relegation to the Second Division
14	St Johnstone (R)	39	10	5	24	51	79	−28	25	Relegation to the Second Division

Source: RSSSF and statto
Rules for classification: 1) points; 2) goal difference; 3) number of goals scored.
(C) Champions; (P) Promoted; (R) Relegated

Promoted: Motherwell, Clydebank
Relegated: Meadowbank Thistle, St Johnstone (The first team to be relegated in successive seasons)

== Scottish League Division Two ==
Pos	Team	Pld	W	D	L	GF	GA	GD	Pts	Promotion
1	Montrose (C, P)	39	22	9	8	57	40	+17	53	Promotion to the First Division
2	Alloa Athletic (P)	39	20	10	9	58	40	+18	50	Promotion to the First Division
3	Dunfermline Athletic	39	17	15	7	61	36	+25	49	
4	Cowdenbeath	39	18	11	10	68	39	+29	47	
5	Stenhousemuir	39	15	15	9	45	43	+2	45	
6	Stirling Albion	39	15	13	11	62	47	+15	43	
7	Raith Rovers	39	18	6	15	69	57	+12	42	
8	Queen of the South	39	10	14	15	42	56	−14	34	
9	Albion Rovers	39	13	8	18	49	72	−23	34	
10	Queen's Park	39	12	9	18	48	55	−7	33	
11	Stranraer	39	13	6	20	52	67	−15	32	
12	East Stirlingshire	39	8	15	16	38	53	−15	31	
13	Berwick Rangers	39	8	12	19	36	49	−13	28	
14	Arbroath	39	9	7	23	35	66	−31	25	

Source: "1984-1985 Second Division - SPFL Archive". SPFL (in Malay).
Rules for classification: 1) points; 2) goal difference; 3) number of goals scored.
(C) Champions; (P) Promoted

Promoted: Montrose, Alloa Athletic

== Other honours ==
=== Cup honours ===
Competition	Winner	Score	Runner-up
Scottish Cup 1984–85	Celtic	2 – 1	Dundee United
League Cup 1984–85	Rangers	1 – 0	Dundee United
Youth Cup	Aberdeen	5 – 3	Celtic
Junior Cup	Pollok	3 – 1	Petershill

=== Individual honours ===
Award	Winner	Club
Footballer of the Year	(Scotland) Hamish McAlpine	Dundee United
Players' Player of the Year	(Scotland) Jim Duffy	Morton
Young Player of the Year	(Scotland) Craig Levein	Heart of Midlothian

== Scotland national team ==
Date	Venue	Opponents	Score	Competition	Scotland scorer(s)
12 September 1984	Hampden Park, Glasgow (H)	(Socialist Federal Republic of Yugoslavia) Yugoslavia	6–1	Friendly	Davie Cooper, Graeme Souness, Kenny Dalglish, Paul Sturrock, Maurice Johnston, Charlie Nicholas
17 October 1984	Hampden Park, Glasgow (H)	Iceland	3–0	WCQG7	Paul McStay (2), Charlie Nicholas
14 November 1984	Hampden Park, Glasgow (H)	Spain	3–1	WCQG7	Maurice Johnston (2), Kenny Dalglish
27 February 1985	Estadio Sanchez Pizjuan, Seville (A)	Spain	0–1	WCQG7	
27 March 1985	Hampden Park, Glasgow (H)	Wales	0–1	WCQG7	
25 May 1985	Hampden Park, Glasgow (H)	England	1–0	Rous Cup	Richard Gough
28 May 1985	Laugardalsvollur, Reykjavík (A)	Iceland	1–0	WCQG7	Jim Bett

Key:

- (H) = Home match
- (A) = Away match
- WCQG7 = World Cup qualifying - Group 7

== See also ==
- 1984–85 Aberdeen F.C. season
