= John MacDonald (footballer, born 1961) =

Scottish footballer

Personal information
- Full name: John MacDonald
- Date of birth: 15 April 1961 (age 65)
- Place of birth: Glasgow, Scotland
- Height: 5 ft 9 in (1.75 m)
- Position: Forward

Senior career*
Years	Team	Apps	(Gls)
1978–1986	Rangers	163	(44)
1986	→ Charlton Athletic (loan)	2	(0)
1986–1989	Barnsley	94	(20)
1989–1991	Scarborough	40	(6)
1991	Airdrieonians	14	(3)
1993–1994	Dumbarton	6	(2)
1994	Fort William		
1994–1995	Caledonian Thistle	2	(1)

International career
1980–1982	Scotland U21	8	(1)
- * Club domestic league appearances and goals

John MacDonald (born 15 April 1961) is a Scottish former footballer who played as a striker for Rangers between 1978 and 1986 before moving to Barnsley. He made 230 appearances for Rangers, scoring 77 goals, and won the 1981 Scottish Cup and the Scottish League Cup in 1982 and 1984.
