= Bobby Russell (footballer, born 1957) =

Scottish footballer

Personal information
- Full name: Robert Russell
- Date of birth: 11 February 1957 (age 69)
- Place of birth: Glasgow, Scotland
- Height: 1.80 m (5 ft 11 in)
- Position: Midfielder

Senior career*
Years	Team	Apps	(Gls)
1977–1987	Rangers	250	(31)
1987–1992	Motherwell	131	(15)
1992–1993	Ayr United	4	(1)
1993	Arbroath	1	(0)
1994	Cowdenbeath	6	(0)
1994–1995	Cumbernauld United		
1995–1997	Albion Rovers	13	(0)

International career
1978–1984	Scotland U21	3	(0)
- * Club domestic league appearances and goals

Robert Russell (born 11 February 1957) is a Scottish former professional footballer, who is best known for his time with Rangers.

== Club career ==
Born in Glasgow, Russell joined Rangers from Shettleston Juniors in 1977 and made his first team debut against Aberdeen on 13 August that year aged 20. The game ended in a 3–1 defeat, however Rangers went on to win the treble that season and Russell cemented his place on the right side of the midfield.

He made 370 appearances for the club and won a league championship, two Scottish Cups and four Scottish League Cups. He left Rangers and joined Motherwell in 1987 and was part of the side that won the 1990–91 Scottish Cup.

== Coaching career ==
Russell returned to Rangers as part of the youth coaching set up. Bobby Russell helps out in Aurora, Ontario with the Aurora Stingers with special clinics.

Russell resides in Aurora Ontario, where he coaches finishing school, for young footballers.
