= 1979–80 Leicester City F.C. season =

1979–80 season of Leicester City

Leicester City
1979–80 season
- Chairman: Dennis Sharp
- Manager: Jock Wallace
- Second Division: 1st (champions)
- FA Cup: Third round
- League Cup: First round
- Top goalscorer: League: Young (14); All: Young (15)
- Average home league attendance: 18,636

During the 1979–80 English football season, Leicester City F.C. competed in the Football League Second Division.

== Season summary ==
In the 1979–80 season, Leicester were promoted as champions of the Second Division for the sixth time in the club's history. From start of the season, the Foxes scored in every game until their 2–0 defeat at Charlton Athletic in mid-December. The only negative part of Leicester's season was a shock FA Cup exit against non-league Harlow Town. It was the first time the Foxes lost to a non-league team in a cup competition since the 1914–15 season. Despite that, after a 2–1 win at Filbert Street against Charlton, Leicester were all but assured of promotion and on the final day of the season, the Foxes beat Leyton Orient at Brisbane Road and with Sunderland only picking up a point, Leicester were crowned champions.

== Final league table ==
Pos	Team	Pld	W	D	L	GF	GA	GD	Pts	Qualification or relegation
1	Leicester City (C, P)	42	21	13	8	58	38	+20	55	Promotion to the First Division
2	Sunderland (P)	42	21	12	9	69	42	+27	54	Promotion to the First Division
3	Birmingham City (P)	42	21	11	10	58	38	+20	53	Promotion to the First Division
4	Chelsea	42	23	7	12	66	52	+14	53	
5	Queens Park Rangers	42	18	13	11	75	53	+22	49	

Rules for classification: 1) Points; 2) Goal difference; 3) Goals scored
(C) Champions; (P) Promoted

Results summary

Overall								Home						Away					
Pld	W	D	L	GF	GA	GD	Pts	W	D	L	GF	GA	GD	W	D	L	GF	GA	GD
42	21	13	8	58	38	+20	55	12	5	4	32	19	+13	9	8	4	26	19	+7

Source: 1979-80 Football League Second Division table

Results by round

Round	1	2	3	4	5	6	7	8	9	10	11	12	13	14	15	16	17	18	19	20	21	22	23	24	25	26	27	28	29	30	31	32	33	34	35	36	37	38	39	40	41	42
Ground	H	A	A	H	H	A	H	A	A	H	H	A	H	A	H	A	H	A	H	A	H	A	H	H	A	A	H	A	H	A	H	A	H	A	H	H	A	H	A	A	H	A
Result	W	D	W	L	W	L	D	W	D	W	L	D	W	W	D	D	W	W	D	L	D	L	W	W	D	W	W	D	D	L	L	D	W	W	L	W	W	W	W	D	W	W
Position	3	4	1	3	3	5	5	3	4	5	6	6	6	3	5	5	5	4	3	4	4	4	4	4	4	3	1	1	1	1	4	3	3	2	3	4	4	2	1	2	1	1

Source: 11v11.com: 1979-80 Leicester City results
A = Away; H = Home; W = Win; D = Draw; L = Loss

== Results ==
Leicester City's score comes first

=== Legend ===
Win	Draw	Loss

=== Football League Second Division ===
Date	Opponent	Venue	Result	Attendance	Scorers
18 August 1979	Watford	H	2–0	15,772	Young (2)
21 August 1979	Cambridge United	A	1–1	6,042	Young
25 August 1979	Queens Park Rangers	A	4–1	13,091	Peake (2), May, Goodwin
1 September 1979	Luton Town	H	1–3	16,241	May
8 September 1979	Notts County	H	1–0	16,595	Young
15 September 1979	Newcastle United	A	2–3	26,443	Smith (2, 1 pen)
22 September 1979	Fulham	H	3–3	21,447	Young (2), Smith
29 September 1979	Swansea City	A	2–0	15,104	Rofe (2)
6 October 1979	Shrewsbury Town	A	2–2	9,045	Goodwin, Byrne
10 October 1979	Cambridge United	H	2–1	15,960	Young, Wilson
13 October 1979	West Ham United	H	1–2	22,472	Williams
20 October 1979	Oldham Athletic	A	1–1	10,297	Young
27 October 1979	Sunderland	H	2–1	19,365	Lineker (2)
3 November 1979	Watford	A	3–1	14,743	Smith (2, 1 pen), Peake
10 November 1979	Burnley	H	1–1	17,191	Young
17 November 1979	Preston North End	A	1–1	10,038	Lineker
24 November 1979	Wrexham	H	2–0	15,316	Strickland, Henderson
1 December 1979	Birmingham City	A	2–1	25,748	Smith, Henderson
8 December 1979	Leyton Orient	H	2–2	16,303	Henderson, Goodwin
15 December 1979	Charlton Athletic	A	0–2	6,717	
21 December 1979	Cardiff City	H	0–0	12,877	
26 December 1979	Chelsea	A	0–1	25,320	
29 December 1979	Queens Park Rangers	H	2–0	20,743	Rofe, Henderson
1 January 1980	Bristol Rovers	H	3–0	21,579	Smith (2), Goodwin
12 January 1980	Luton Town	A	0–0	14,141	
19 January 1980	Notts County	A	1–0	14,859	Strickland
2 February 1980	Newcastle United	H	1–0	22,549	Smith (pen)
9 February 1980	Fulham	A	0–0	8,691	
20 February 1980	Swansea City	H	1–1	17,597	Henderson
23 February 1980	West Ham United	A	1–3	27,762	Young
1 March 1980	Oldham Athletic	H	0–1	16,991	
8 March 1980	Sunderland	A	0–0	29,487	
15 March 1980	Shrewsbury Town	H	2–0	15,391	Young, Edmunds
22 March 1980	Burnley	A	2–1	7,173	Edmunds, Young
29 March 1980	Preston North End	H	1–2	15,293	Kelly
5 April 1980	Chelsea	H	1–0	25,826	May
8 April 1980	Cardiff City	A	1–0	10,291	Smith
12 April 1980	Birmingham City	H	2–1	26,075	Wilson, Young
19 April 1980	Wrexham	A	1–0	10,023	Kelly
23 April 1980	Bristol Rovers	A	1–1	8,205	Smith
26 April 1980	Charlton Athletic	H	2–1	23,875	Young, Smith
3 May 1980	Leyton Orient	A	1–0	13,828	May

=== FA Cup ===
Round	Date	Opponent	Venue	Result	Attendance	Goalscorers
R3	5 January 1980	Harlow Town	H	1–1	21,302	Henderson
R3R	8 January 1980	Harlow Town	A	0–1	9,723	

=== League Cup ===
Round	Date	Opponent	Venue	Result	Attendance	Goalscorers
R1 1st leg	11 August 1979	Rotherham United	H	1–2	11,210	Young
R1 2nd leg	14 August 1979	Rotherham United	A	0–3 (lost 1–5 on agg)	5,179	

== Squad ==
Note: Flags indicate national team as defined under FIFA eligibility rules; some limited exceptions apply. Players may hold more than one non-FIFA nationality.

Pos.	Nation	Player
GK	ENG	Mark Wallington
GK	SCO	Alexander Edmond
DF	SCO	Tommy Williams
DF	SCO	Gregor Stevens
DF	ENG	Larry May
DF	SCO	Ian Wilson
MF	IRL	Pat Byrne
MF	SCO	Eddie Kelly
FW	SCO	Alan Young
FW	SCO	Martin Henderson
DF	SCO	Bobby Smith
DF	ENG	Dennis Rofe

Pos.	Nation	Player
MF	ENG	Andy Peake
MF	ENG	Mark Goodwin
MF	SCO	Alan Lee
DF	NIR	John O'Neill
FW	SCO	Derek Strickland
DF	SCO	Peter Welsh
FW	ENG	Gary Lineker
MF	ENG	Mick Duffy
FW	ENG	David Buchanan
DF	ENG	Geoff Scott
MF	ENG	Paul Edmunds
DF	ATG	Everton Carr
