= 1980–81 Leicester City F.C. season =

1980–81 season of Leicester City

Leicester City
1980–81 season
- Chairman: Dennis Sharp
- Manager: Jock Wallace
- First Division: 21st (relegated)
- FA Cup: Fourth round
- League Cup: Second round
- Top goalscorer: League: Melrose (9); All: Melrose (11)
- Average home league attendance: 19,476
Home colours

During the 1980–81 English football season, Leicester City F.C. competed in the Football League First Division.

In the 1980–81 season, Leicester were in the relegation places for most of the season and were stuck in the bottom three since the beginning of November which also included only 2 wins in 16 league games from beginning of September to the end of November. Their only highlight of the season was their famous league double over Liverpool as well as inflicting Liverpool's first home defeat in 85 games on 31 January 1981 with a 2–1 win at Anfield.

In 1980, ex-player Dave Richardson joined Leicester City as Youth Team Manager, bringing paedophile, Ted Langford, from his old club to become a scout.

== Final league table ==
Pos	Team	Pld	W	D	L	GF	GA	GD	Pts	Qualification or relegation
18	Wolverhampton Wanderers	42	13	9	20	43	55	−12	35	
19	Brighton & Hove Albion	42	14	7	21	54	67	−13	35	
20	Norwich City (R)	42	13	7	22	49	73	−24	33	Relegation to the Second Division
21	Leicester City (R)	42	13	6	23	40	67	−27	32	Relegation to the Second Division
22	Crystal Palace (R)	42	6	7	29	47	83	−36	19	Relegation to the Second Division

Source: World Football
Rules for classification: 1) Points; 2) Goal difference; 3) Goals scored
(R) Relegated

== Results ==
Leicester City's score comes first

=== Legend ===
Win	Draw	Loss

=== Football League First Division ===
Date	Opponent	Venue	Result	Attendance	Scorers
16 August 1980	Ipswich Town	H	0–1	21,640	
19 August 1980	Everton	A	0–1	23,337	
23 August 1980	Liverpool	H	2–0	28,455	Peake, Henderson
30 August 1980	Leeds United	A	2–1	18,530	O'Neill, Henderson
6 September 1980	Sunderland	H	0–1	20,638	
13 September 1980	Manchester United	A	0–5	43,229	
20 September 1980	Nottingham Forest	A	0–5	27,145	
27 September 1980	Tottenham Hotspur	H	2–1	22,616	Smith, Buchanan
4 October 1980	Arsenal	A	0–1	28,490	
8 October 1980	Stoke City	H	1–1	14,549	Wilson
11 October 1980	Coventry City	H	1–3	17,104	Lineker
18 October 1980	Crystal Palace	A	1–2	16,387	Young
21 October 1980	Middlesbrough	A	0–1	13,114	
25 October 1980	Wolverhampton Wanderers	H	2–0	18,133	Henderson, Young
1 November 1980	Aston Villa	A	0–2	29,953	
8 November 1980	Manchester City	H	1–1	19,104	Young
12 November 1980	Everton	H	0–1	15,511	
15 November 1980	Ipswich Town	A	1–3	19,892	Williams
22 November 1980	West Bromwich Albion	A	1–3	17,752	Lineker
29 November 1980	Norwich City	H	1–2	13,958	Young
6 December 1980	Birmingham City	A	2–1	18,479	Melrose (2)
13 December 1980	Middlesbrough	H	1–0	13,998	MacDonald
20 December 1980	Stoke City	A	0–1	13,433	
26 December 1980	Brighton & Hove Albion	H	0–1	19,570	
27 December 1980	Southampton	A	0–4	21,886	
10 January 1981	West Bromwich Albion	H	0–2	17,778	
17 January 1981	Leeds United	H	0–1	16,094	
31 January 1981	Liverpool	A	2–1	35,154	Byrne, Melrose
7 February 1981	Manchester United	H	1–0	26,085	Melrose
14 February 1981	Sunderland	A	0–1	22,569	
21 February 1981	Tottenham Hotspur	A	2–1	27,326	Lynex, Byrne
28 February 1981	Nottingham Forest	H	1–1	26,608	Lynex
7 March 1981	Arsenal	H	1–0	20,198	Williams
14 March 1981	Coventry City	A	1–4	21,430	Young
21 March 1981	Crystal Palace	H	1–1	15,176	O'Neill
28 March 1981	Wolverhampton Wanderers	A	1–0	21,694	Melrose
31 March 1981	Manchester City	A	3–3	10,291	Williams, Young, Melrose
4 April 1981	Aston Villa	H	2–4	26,032	Lynex (2, 1 pen)
18 April 1981	Southampton	H	2–2	21,349	Young, Lynex (pen)
20 April 1981	Brighton & Hove Albion	A	1–2	21,176	MacDonald
25 April 1981	Birmingham City	H	1–0	13,666	Williams
2 May 1981	Norwich City	A	3–2	24,675	Melrose (3)

=== FA Cup ===
Round	Date	Opponent	Venue	Result	Attendance	Goalscorers
R3	3 January 1981	Cardiff City	H	3–0	17,527	Lineker, Buchanan, Melrose
R4	24 January 1981	Exeter City	H	1–1	20,996	Henderson
R4R	28 January 1981	Exeter City	A	1–3	15,268	Melrose

=== League Cup ===
Round	Date	Opponent	Venue	Result	Attendance	Goalscorers
R2 1st leg	26 August 1980	West Bromwich Albion	A	0–1	13,810	
R2 2nd leg	3 September 1980	West Bromwich Albion	H	0–1 (lost 0–2 on agg)	17,081	

== Squad ==
Note: Flags indicate national team as defined under FIFA eligibility rules; some limited exceptions apply. Players may hold more than one non-FIFA nationality.

Pos.	Nation	Player
GK	SCO	Alexander Edmond
GK	ENG	Mark Wallington
DF	SCO	Tommy Williams
DF	SCO	William Gibson
MF	ENG	Andy Peake
DF	ENG	Larry May
DF	NIR	John O'Neill
MF	ENG	Paul Edmunds
FW	SCO	Jim Melrose
FW	SCO	Alan Young
DF	SCO	Ian Wilson
DF	SCO	Bobby Smith
FW	SCO	Martin Henderson
MF	ENG	Mark Goodwin
DF	ATG	Everton Carr

Pos.	Nation	Player
MF	ENG	Neil Grewcock
DF	ENG	Peter Welsh
MF	SCO	Eddie Kelly
DF	ENG	Geoff Scott
FW	ENG	Dave Buchanan
FW	ENG	Gary Lineker
MF	IRL	Pat Byrne
MF	SCO	Stewart Hamill
MF	SCO	Kevin MacDonald
DF	SCO	Paul Friar
MF	ENG	Steve Lynex
MF	NIR	Paul Ramsey
DF	ENG	Norman Leet
