= 1978–79 Leicester City F.C. season =

1978–79 season of Leicester City

Leicester City
1978–79 season
- Chairman: Dennis Sharp
- Manager: Jock Wallace
- Second Division: 17th
- FA Cup: Fourth round
- League Cup: Second round
- Top goalscorer: Christie (8)
- Average home league attendance: 14,187

During the 1978–79 English football season, Leicester City F.C. competed in the Football League Second Division.

== Season summary ==
In the 1978–79 season, Jock Wallace left Rangers to become Leicester's new boss following the Foxes' relegation from the First Division. It was a disappointing season for the Foxes but were not helped by lack of finances to sign quality players but the only positive from the season was that Wallace had to use youth policy and play some youngsters and it brought some success in results. Despite that they finished the season in 17th place.

== Final league table ==
Pos	Team	Pld	W	D	L	GF	GA	GD	Pts	Qualification or relegation
15	Wrexham	42	12	14	16	45	42	+3	38	Qualification for the Cup Winners' Cup first round
16	Bristol Rovers	42	14	10	18	48	60	−12	38	
17	Leicester City	42	10	17	15	43	52	−9	37	
18	Luton Town	42	13	10	19	60	57	+3	36	
19	Charlton Athletic	42	11	13	18	60	69	−9	35	

Rules for classification: 1) Points; 2) Goal difference; 3) Goals scored

Results summary

Overall								Home						Away					
Pld	W	D	L	GF	GA	GD	Pts	W	D	L	GF	GA	GD	W	D	L	GF	GA	GD
42	10	17	15	43	52	−9	37	7	8	6	28	23	+5	3	9	9	15	29	−14

Source: 1978–79 Football League Second Division table

Results by round

Round	1	2	3	4	5	6	7	8	9	10	11	12	13	14	15	16	17	18	19	20	21	22	23	24	25	26	27	28	29	30	31	32	33	34	35	36	37	38	39	40	41	42
Ground	A	H	H	A	H	A	H	A	A	H	A	H	A	H	A	H	H	A	A	H	A	H	H	A	H	H	A	H	A	H	H	A	A	H	H	A	A	H	A	A	H	A
Result	D	L	D	D	L	D	W	W	L	L	L	D	W	W	D	D	L	D	L	D	D	W	D	L	W	W	L	L	D	W	W	D	L	D	L	L	L	D	W	L	D	D
Position	8	15	16	16	19	19	14	11	13	17	18	18	16	15	16	15	17	14	18	18	18	16	16	17	16	11	14	16	16	14	12	12	12	13	13	15	15	14	12	15	15	17

Source: 11v11.com: 1978–79 Leicester City results
A = Away; H = Home; W = Win; D = Draw; L = Loss

== Results ==
Leicester City's score comes first

=== Legend ===
Win	Draw	Loss

=== Football League Second Division ===
Date	Opponent	Venue	Result	Attendance	Scorers
19 August 1978	Burnley	A	2–2	12,048	Hughes, Christie (pen)
23 August 1978	Sheffield United	H	0–1	19,381	
26 August 1978	Cambridge United	H	1–1	14,148	Christie
2 September 1978	Wrexham	A	0–0	12,785	
9 September 1978	Notts County	H	0–1	14,485	
16 September 1978	Blackburn Rovers	A	1–1	7,908	Weller
23 September 1978	Brighton & Hove Albion	H	4–1	14,307	Christie, Hughes (2, 1 pen), Weller
30 September 1978	Orient	A	1–0	5,430	Christie
7 October 1978	Newcastle United	A	0–1	25,731	
14 October 1978	Charlton Athletic	H	0–3	15,960	
21 October 1978	Cardiff City	A	0–1	8,791	
28 October 1978	Bristol Rovers	H	0–0	12,498	
4 November 1978	Luton Town	A	1–0	10,608	Christie
11 November 1978	Burnley	H	2–1	12,842	Weller, Christie
18 November 1978	Cambridge United	A	1–1	8,875	Henderson
22 November 1978	Wrexham	H	1–1	14,734	Christie
25 November 1978	West Ham United	H	1–2	16,149	Christie
2 December 1978	Stoke City	A	0–0	15,950	
16 December 1978	Crystal Palace	A	1–3	17,330	May
23 December 1978	Preston North End	H	1–1	10,481	Davies
26 December 1978	Sunderland	A	1–1	24,544	Henderson
1 January 1979	Oldham Athletic	H	2–0	12,757	Buchanan, Smith
20 January 1979	Blackburn Rovers	H	1–1	13,234	May
3 February 1979	Brighton & Hove Albion	A	1–3	19,973	Davies
10 February 1979	Orient	H	5–3	12,050	Smith, Buchanan, May, Williams, Goodwin
17 February 1979	Newcastle United	H	2–1	15,106	Peake, Buchanan
24 February 1979	Charlton Athletic	A	0–1	7,936	
3 March 1979	Cardiff City	H	1–2	12,820	Grewcock
10 March 1979	Bristol Rovers	A	1–1	6,381	Smith (pen)
21 March 1979	Fulham	H	1–0	10,396	Buchanan
28 March 1979	Luton Town	H	3–0	10,465	May, Smith, Williams
31 March 1979	West Ham United	A	1–1	23,992	Henderson
4 April 1979	Millwall	A	0–2	4,758	
7 April 1979	Stoke City	H	1–1	17,502	Buchanan
14 April 1979	Sunderland	H	1–2	20,740	Henderson
16 April 1979	Oldham Athletic	A	1–2	7,179	Smith
17 April 1979	Preston North End	A	0–4	10,394	
20 April 1979	Crystal Palace	H	1–1	16,767	Smith
24 April 1979	Notts County	A	1–0	8,702	Lineker
28 April 1979	Fulham	A	0–3	7,002	
5 May 1979	Millwall	H	0–0	12,828	
8 May 1979	Sheffield United	A	2–2	15,178	Peake, Duffy

=== FA Cup ===
Round	Date	Opponent	Venue	Result	Attendance	Goalscorers
R3	6 January 1979	Norwich City	H	3–0	19,680	May, Weller, Henderson
R4	26 February 1979	Oldham Athletic	A	1–3	11,972	Henderson

=== League Cup ===
Round	Date	Opponent	Venue	Result	Attendance	Goalscorers
R2	30 August 1978	Derby County	H	0–1	18,827	

== Squad ==
Note: Flags indicate national team as defined under FIFA eligibility rules; some limited exceptions apply. Players may hold more than one non-FIFA nationality.

Pos.	Nation	Player
GK	ENG	Mark Wallington
GK	ENG	Steve Humphries
GK	ENG	Sean Rafter
DF	SCO	Tommy Williams
DF	ENG	Steve Whitworth
DF	ENG	Larry May
MF	ENG	George Armstrong
MF	SCO	Eddie Kelly
MF	ENG	Keith Weller
FW	ENG	Trevor Christie
FW	SCO	Martin Henderson
DF	SCO	Bobby Smith
DF	ENG	Dennis Rofe
MF	ENG	John Ridley
FW	SCO	Billy Hughes
MF	ENG	Steve Kember
DF	ENG	Steve Sims
FW	ENG	Roger Davies

Pos.	Nation	Player
MF	ENG	Andy Peake
MF	ENG	Mark Goodwin
MF	SCO	Alan Lee
DF	NIR	John O'Neill
DF	SCO	Peter Welsh
FW	ENG	Gary Lineker
MF	ENG	Mick Duffy
MF	ENG	Winston White
DF	ENG	David Webb
MF	ENG	Kevin Reed
FW	ENG	David Buchanan
MF	ENG	Neil Grewcock
DF	ATG	Everton Carr
FW	ENG	John Allen
DF	ENG	Bob Atkins
FW	SCO	John Stalker
DF	ENG	Mark Warburton
