= 1981–82 Leicester City F.C. season =

1981–82 season of Leicester City

Leicester City
1981–82 season
- Chairman: Terry Shipman
- Manager: Jock Wallace
- Second Division: 8th
- FA Cup: Semi-finals
- League Cup: Third round
- Top goalscorer: League: Lineker (17); All: Lineker (19)
- Average home league attendance: 14,183
Home colours

During the 1981–82 English football season, Leicester City F.C. competed in the Football League Second Division.

== Season summary ==
In the 1981–82 season where the Football League decided to increase the points total on a win to three instead of two points, Leicester's start was inconsistent but during the last couple of months of the campaign, the Foxes revived strongly and finished in eighth. At the end of the season, Wallace left to join Motherwell.

== Competitions ==
=== Division Two ===
==== League table ====
Pos	Team	Pld	W	D	L	GF	GA	GD	Pts
6	Barnsley	42	19	10	13	59	41	+18	67
7	Rotherham United	42	20	7	15	66	54	+12	67
8	Leicester City	42	18	12	12	56	48	+8	66
9	Newcastle United	42	18	8	16	52	50	+2	62
10	Blackburn Rovers	42	16	11	15	47	43	+4	59

Rules for classification: 1) Points; 2) Goal difference; 3) Goals scored

==== Position by round ====
Round	1	2	3	4	5	6	7	8	9	10	11	12	13	14	15	16	17	18	19	20	21	22	23	24	25	26	27	28	29	30	31	32	33	34	35	36	37	38	39	40	41	42
Ground	H	A	A	H	A	H	H	A	A	H	A	H	H	H	A	A	H	A	H	H	H	A	A	A	A	H	A	H	H	A	A	H	H	A	A	A	H	A	H	H	H	A
Result	D	W	W	L	L	D	W	D	W	D	L	D	W	L	L	W	D	D	D	L	W	W	W	W	L	W	W	L	W	W	D	D	W	W	D	W	L	W	L	L	D	L
Position	11	7	6	11	11	11	7	8	11	8	6	11	10	9	9	14	14	9	12	14	12	13	13	12	12	10	10	11	7	7	8	10	7	5	4	4	8	6	8	8	8	8

Source: https://www.11v11.com/teams/leicester-city/tab/matches/season/1982/
A = Away; H = Home; W = Win; D = Draw; L = Loss; = Division Two Champions, Promoted to 1982–83 Football League Division One; = Promoted to 1982–83 Football League Division One; = Relegated to Division Three

Leicester City's score comes first

==== Matches ====
29 August 1981 1	Grimsby Town	2–2	Leicester City	Cleethorpes
	Kilmore 27'; Drinkell 47'		16' Lineker; 72' Melrose	Stadium: Blundell Park; Attendance: 11,032

5 September 1981 2	Leicester City	1–0	Wrexham	Leicester
	Hamill 62'			Stadium: Filbert Street; Attendance: 12,905

8 September 1981 3	Leicester City	1–0	Barnsley	Leicester
	Hamill			Stadium: Filbert Street; Attendance: 15,447

12 September 1981 4	Derby County	1–3	Leicester City	Derby
	Hector 5'; Buckley 30'; Ramage 44'		63' Melrose	Stadium: Baseball Ground; Attendance: 16,046

19 September 1981 5	Leicester City	1–2	Luton Town	Leicester
	Lynex 38' (pen.)		46', 52' White	Stadium: Filbert Street; Attendance: 14,159

22 September 1981 6	Rotherham United	1–1	Leicester City	Rotherham
	Goal		May	Stadium: Millmoor; Attendance: 7,781

26 September 1981 7	Blackburn Rovers	2–0	Leicester City	Blackburn
			39' May; 73' Melrose	Stadium: Ewood Park; Attendance: 8,925

3 October 1981 8	Leicester City	1–1	Crystal Palace	Leicester
	Lineker 82'		51' Hilaire	Stadium: Filbert Street; Attendance: 12,558

10 October 1981 9	Bolton Wanderers	0–3	Leicester City	Bolton
			45' 73'Melrose; 75' Young	Stadium: Burnden Park; Attendance: 7,361

16 October 1981 10	Leicester City	1–1	Chelsea	Leicester
	Melrose 30'		26' Fillery	Stadium: Filbert Street; Attendance: 18,358

24 October 1981 11	Queens Park Rangers	2–0	Leicester City	Shepherd's Bush (West London)
	Stainrod 28'; Gregory 79'			Stadium: Loftus Road; Attendance: 12,419

31 October 1981 12	Leicester City	0–0	Sheffield Wednesday	Leicester
				Stadium: Filbert Street; Attendance: 19,125

7 November 1981 13	Charlton Athletic	1–4	Leicester City	Charlton (Southeast London)
	Walsh 42'		31' Melrose; 77' (pen.) Lynex; 82', 83' Lineker	Stadium: The Valley; Attendance: 8,212

14 November 1981 14	Leicester City	0–1	Orient	Leicester
			82' McNeil	Stadium: Filbert Street; Attendance: 11,733

21 November 1981 15	Cardiff City	1–3	Leicester City	Cardiff
	Micallef 72'; Bennett 85'; Stevens 88'		87' Welsh	Stadium: Ninian Park; Attendance: 6,687

28 November 1981 16	Leicester City	4–1	Cambridge United	Leicester
	Lynex 3'; Hebberd 46'; Peake 50'; Lineker 64'		65' Christie	Stadium: Filbert Street; Attendance: 9,524

5 December 1981 17	Norwich City	0–0	Leicester City	Norwich
				Stadium: Carrow Road; Attendance: 12,768

12 December 1981 18	Leicester City	1–1	Watford	Leicester
GMT	Lineker		Goal	Stadium: Filbert Street; Attendance: 10,340

28 December 1981 19	Oldham Athletic	1–1	Leicester City	Oldham
GMT	Goal		Lynex	Stadium: Boundary Park; Attendance: 9,174

30 January 1982 20	Luton Town	1–2	Leicester City	Luton
GMT	White 13'; Donaghy 67'		52' Lineker	Stadium: Kenilworth Road; Attendance: 11,810

6 February 1982 21	Leicester City	2–1	Derby County	Leicester
	Lynex 71 ' (pen.); Lineker 85'		75' Emson	Stadium: Filbert Street; Attendance: 14,132

20 February 1982 22	Leicester City	1–0	Blackburn Rovers	Leicester
	Peake 43'			Stadium: Filbert Street; Attendance: 11,667

27 February 1982 23	Leicester City	1–0	Bolton Wanderers	Leicester
	Lynex 89' (pen.)			Stadium: Filbert Street; Attendance: 10,678

2 March 1982 24	Leicester City	3–0	Newcastle United	Leicester
	Young; Lineker,			Stadium: Filbert Street; Attendance: 12,497

9 March 1982 25	Chelsea	4–1	Leicester City	Fulham (West London)
	Hales 3'; Locke 50'; Mayes 80', 83'		57' (pen.) Lynex	Stadium: Stamford Bridge; Attendance: 10,586

13 March 1982 26	Leicester City	3–2	Queens Park Rangers	Leicester
	Lynex 0' (pen.); Young; Melrose		Goal	Stadium: Filbert Street; Attendance: 17,821

17 March 1982 27	Leicester City	1–0	Rotherham United	Leicester
	Melrose 81'			Stadium: Filbert Street; Attendance: 21,123

20 March 1982 28	Sheffield Wednesday	2–0	Leicester City	Sheffield
	Bannister 68'; Pearson 87'			Stadium: Hillsborough; Attendance: 18,962

23 March 1982 29	Crystal Palace	0–2	Leicester City	Croydon (South London)
			Lynex; Lineker	Stadium: Selhurst Park; Attendance: 9,506

27 March 1982 30	Leicester City	3–1	Charlton Athletic	Leicester
	Hales 36'		70', 81' Young; 77' MacDonald	Stadium: Filbert Street; Attendance: 13,681

30 March 1982 31	Shrewsbury Town	1–1	Leicester City	Shrewsbury
	Goal		Lineker	Stadium: Gay Meadow; Attendance: 5,340

10 April 1982 32	Newcastle United	0–0	Leicester City	Newcastle-upon-Tyne
				Stadium: St. James' Park; Attendance: 25,777

13 April 1982 33	Leicester City	2–1	Oldham Athletic	Leicester
	Melrose; Lineker		Goal	Stadium: Filbert Street; Attendance: 14,298

17 April 1982 34	Leicester City	3–1	Cardiff City	Leicester
	Lineker 1', 78'; Lynex 51'		40' Kitchen	Stadium: Filbert Street; Attendance: 13,650

20 April 1982 35	Wrexham	0–0	Leicester City	Wrexham
				Stadium: Racecourse Ground; Attendance: 4,913

24 April 1982 36	Cambridge United	1–2	Leicester City	Cambridge
	Fallon 84'		7' Lineker; 89' Welsh	Stadium: Abbey Stadium; Attendance: 7,212

1 May 1982 37	Leicester City	1–4	Norwich City	Leicester
	May 88'		Deehan 23'; Barham 47'; Bertschin 53'; Leet 66' (o.g.)	Stadium: Filbert Street; Attendance: 19,630

4 May 1982 38	Barnsley	0–2	Leicester City	Barnsley
			Welsh; Lineker	Stadium: Oakwell Stadium; Attendance: 15,418

8 May 1982 39	Watford	3–1	Leicester City	Watford
	Barnes 7', 38'; Blissett 34'		76' Melrose	Stadium: Vicarage Road; Attendance: 20,859

12 May 1982 40	Leicester City	1–2	Grimsby Town	Leicester
	Welsh 0' (pen.)		Goal	Stadium: Filbert Street; Attendance: 13,941

15 May 1982 41	Leicester City	0–0	Shrewsbury Town	Leicester
				Stadium: Filbert Street; Attendance: 11,368

18 May 1982 42	Orient	3–0	Leicester City	Leyton (East London)
				Stadium: Brisbane Road; Attendance: 2,107

=== FA Cup ===
Round	Date	Opponent	Venue	Result	Attendance	Goalscorers
R3	2 January 1982	Southampton	H	3–1	20,589	Young (2), Lineker
R4	23 January 1982	Hereford United	A	1–0	10,602	May
R5	13 February 1982	Watford	H	2–0	27,991	O'Neill, Terry (own goal)
QF	6 March 1982	Shrewsbury Town	H	5–2	29,117	May, Melrose (2), Lineker, Cross (own goal)
SF	3 April 1982	Tottenham Hotspur	N	0–2	46,606	

=== League Cup ===
Round	Date	Opponent	Venue	Result	Attendance	Goalscorers
R2 1st leg	6 October 1981	Preston North End	A	0–1	5,382	
R2 2nd leg	28 October 1981	Preston North End	H	4–0 (won 4-1 on agg)	7,685	Robson, Lynex, Melrose, O'Riordan (own goal)
R3	11 November 1981	Aston Villa	H	0–0	19,806	
R3R	25 November 1981	Aston Villa	A	0–2	23,136	

== Squad ==
Note: Flags indicate national team as defined under FIFA eligibility rules; some limited exceptions apply. Players may hold more than one non-FIFA nationality.

Pos.	Nation	Player
GK	ENG	Mark Wallington
DF	SCO	Tommy Williams
DF	NIR	John O'Neill
DF	ENG	Larry May
DF	SCO	Paul Friar
MF	ENG	Steve Lynex
MF	SCO	Ian Wilson
MF	ENG	Andy Peake
FW	ENG	Gary Lineker
FW	SCO	Alan Young
MF	SCO	Kevin MacDonald
FW	SCO	Jim Melrose

Pos.	Nation	Player
DF	ENG	Norman Leet
MF	SCO	Eddie Kelly
MF	NIR	Paul Ramsey
FW	ENG	Keith Robson
DF	ENG	Geoff Scott
DF	SCO	Billy Gibson
DF	SCO	Peter Welsh
GK	SCO	Nicky Walker
MF	ENG	Trevor Hebberd (on loan from Southampton)
DF	SCO	Bobby Smith
MF	SCO	Stewart Hamill
FW	ENG	Dave Buchanan
