= 1976–77 Rangers F.C. season =

Rangers
1976–77 season
- Chairman: Rae Simpson
- Manager: Jock Wallace
- Ground: Ibrox Park
- Scottish Premier Division: 2nd P36 W18 D10 L8 F62 A37 Pts46
- Scottish Cup: Runners-up
- League Cup: Semi-finals
- European Cup: First round
- Tennent Caledonian Cup: Runners-up
- Top goalscorer: League: Derek Parlane (16); All: Derek Johnstone (21)

The 1976–77 season was the 97th season of competitive football by Rangers.

== Overview ==
Rangers played a total of 54 competitive matches during the 1976–77 season. They were beaten in the Scottish Cup final by Celtic.

== Results ==
All results are written with Rangers' score first.

=== Scottish Premier Division ===
Date	Opponent	Venue	Result	Attendance	Scorers
4 September 1976	Celtic	A	2–2	54,857	Johnstone, Parlane
11 September 1976	Kilmarnock	H	0–0	24,800	
18 September 1976	Hibernian	A	1–1	19,606	Parlane
25 September 1976	Heart of Midlothian	H	4–2	24,329	Hamilton, Miller (pen), Parlane, Johnstone
2 October 1976	Ayr United	A	1–1	14,231	Parlane
16 October 1976	Aberdeen	H	1–0	23,258	MacDonald
23 October 1976	Motherwell	A	1–3	15,857	Hamilton
30 October 1976	Partick Thistle	A	1–2	16,371	Watson
9 November 1976	Dundee United	H	3–0	17,492	Jackson, McKean, Parlane
13 November 1976	Kilmarnock	A	4–0	14,717	Jackson (2), McKean, Parlane
20 November 1976	Hibernian	H	1–1	25,072	Parlane
24 November 1976	Celtic	H	0–1	50,562	
27 November 1976	Heart of Midlothian	A	1–0	18,321	Parlane
26 December 1976	Motherwell	H	1–0	29,236	O'Hara
1 January 1977	Partick Thistle	H	1-0	20,946	
8 January 1977	Kilmarnock	H	3–0	18,189	Parlane (2), O'Hara
11 January 1977	Celtic	A	0–1	49,729	
19 January 1977	Aberdeen	A	3–3	22,584	Miller, MacDonald, Johnstone
22 January 1977	Heart of Midlothian	H	3–2	20,966	MacDonald (2), Johnstone
5 February 1977	Ayr United	A	2–0	12,895	Johnstone, McLean
12 February 1977	Dundee United	H	2–3	18,656	Jackson, MacDonald
16 February 1977	Hibernian	H	0–0	12,452	
19 February 1977	Aberdeen	H	1–0	18,882	Miller (pen)
5 March 1977	Motherwell	A	2–0	15,468	MacDonald, Watson
8 March 1977	Dundee United	A	0–0	10,743	
15 March 1977	Partick Thistle	A	3–4	8,840	McLean, Watson, Parlane
19 March 1977	Celtic	H	2–2	53,743	Parlane
23 March 1977	Ayr United	H	1–1	9,212	Johnstone
26 March 1977	Kilmarnock	A	0–1	8,037	
2 April 1977	Hibernian	H	2–1	12,670	Parlane, Johnstone
9 April 1977	Heart of Midlothian	A	3–1	12,021	Johnstone, Parlane, Jardine (pen)
13 April 1977	Partick Thistle	H	2–1	7,758	Johnstone, Jardine
16 April 1977	Ayr United	H	5–1	11,428	MacDonald (2), Johnstone, Hamilton, Miller
20 April 1977	Motherwell	H	4–1	8,257	Johnstone, MacDonald, Parlane, Robertson
23 April 1977	Dundee United	A	1–0	7,919	Johnstone
30 April 1977	Aberdeen	A	1–2	14,471	Johnstone

=== European Cup ===
Date	Round	Opponent	Venue	Result	Attendance	Scorers
15 September 1976	R1	FC Zurich	H	1–1	35,000	Parlane
29 September 1976	R1	FC Zurich	A	0–1	28,500	

=== Scottish Cup ===
Date	Round	Opponent	Venue	Result	Attendance	Scorers
29 January 1977	R3	Falkirk	H	3–1	17,500	Jardine (pen), Johnstone, MacDonald
26 February 1977	R4	Elgin City	H	3–0	18,000	Jackson, McLean (pen), MacDonald
12 March 1977	QF	Motherwell	H	2–0	35,572	McKean, Watson
30 March 1977	SF	Heart of Midlothian	N	2–0	23,222	Jackson, Jardine (pen)
7 May 1977	F	Celtic	N	0–1	54,252	

=== League Cup ===
Date	Round	Opponent	Venue	Result	Attendance	Scorers
14 August 1976	SR	St Johnstone	H	5–0	31,000	Jardine (2), Johnstone, Miller (pen), Henderson
18 August 1976	SR	Hibernian	A	1–1	26,000	Munro
21 August 1976	SR	Montrose	H	4–0	18,500	Johnstone (2), Jardine, MacDonald
25 August 1976	SR	Hibernian	H	3–0	45,000	Miller (pen), Jardine, McLean
28 August 1976	SR	Montrose	H	3–0	8,000	Johnstone, Parlane, Jardine
1 September 1976	SR	St Johnstone	A	1–0	4,070	Jardine
22 September 1976	QF1	Clydebank	H	3–3	15,000	Johnstone, MacDonald, Hamilton
6 October 1976	QF2	Clydebank	A	1–1	10,000	Greig
18 October 1976	QF R	Clydebank	H	0–0	15,000	
19 October 1976	QF 2R	Clydebank	N	2–1	14,000	Parlane, McLean
27 October 1976	SF	Aberdeen	N	1–5	20,990	MacDonald

=== Non-competitive ===
==== Tennent Caledonian Cup ====
Date	Round	Opponent	Venue	Result	Attendance	Scorers
2 August 1976	SF	Partick Thistle	H	2–0		
3 August 1976	F	Southampton	H	1–2		

== Appearances ==
Player	Position	Appearances	Goals
(Scotland) Davie Armour	MF	1	0
(Scotland) Ally Dawson	DF	2	0
(Scotland) Jim Denny	DF	16	0
(Scotland) Tom Forsyth	MF	40	0
(Scotland) John Greig	DF	48	1
(Scotland) Johnny Hamilton	MF	31	4
(Scotland) Martin Henderson	FW	12	1
(Scotland) Colin Jackson	DF	40	6
(Scotland) Sandy Jardine	DF	54	10
(Scotland) Derek Johnstone	DF	42	21
(Scotland) Stewart Kennedy	GK	40	0
(Scotland) Alex MacDonald	MF	48	14
(Scotland) Peter McCloy	GK	14	0
(Scotland) Ian McDougall	DF	6	0
(Scotland) Bobby McKean	MF	33	3
(Scotland) Tommy McLean	MF	53	4
(Scotland) Alex Miller	DF	36	6
(Scotland) Eric Morris	DF	1	0
(Scotland) Iain Munro	MF	11	1
(Scotland) Alex O'Hara	MF	5	2
(Scotland) Derek Parlane	FW	50	17
(Scotland) Chris Robertson	FW	13	1
(Scotland) Jim Steele	DF	5	0
(Scotland) Colin Stein	FW	2	0
(Scotland) Kenny Watson	MF	38	3

== League table ==
Pos	Team	Pld	W	D	L	GF	GA	GD	Pts	Qualification or relegation
1	Celtic (C)	36	23	9	4	79	39	+40	55	Qualification for the European Cup first round
2	Rangers	36	18	10	8	62	37	+25	46	Qualification for the Cup Winners' Cup first round
3	Aberdeen	36	16	11	9	56	42	+14	43	Qualification for the UEFA Cup first round
4	Dundee United	36	16	9	11	54	45	+9	41	Qualification for the UEFA Cup first round
5	Partick Thistle	36	11	13	12	40	44	−4	35	

Source: Statto
Rules for classification: 1) points; 2) goal difference; 3) number of goals scored.
(C) Champions

== See also ==
- 1976–77 in Scottish football
- 1976–77 Scottish Cup
- 1976–77 Scottish League Cup
- 1976–77 European Cup
