= 1982–83 Leicester City F.C. season =

1982–83 season of Leicester City

Leicester City
1982–83 season
- Chairman: Terry Shipman
- Manager: Gordon Milne
- Second Division: 3rd (promoted)
- FA Cup: Third round
- League Cup: Second round
- Top goalscorer: Lineker (26)
- Average home league attendance: 12,819
Home colours

During the 1982–83 English football season, Leicester City F.C. competed in the Football League Second Division.

== Season summary ==
In August 1982, Gordon Milne left Coventry City to join Leicester as their new boss. The 1982–83 season didn't start well for the Foxes with just 6 wins in their first 16 league games which saw Leicester in 15th and looked like their promotion challenge was over. Then from December onwards until the end of the season, Leicester lost only 4 league games during their impressive league form and finished the season unbeaten in 15 league matches. Heading to the final league game, Leicester were ahead of Fulham on goal difference knowing a slip up would see the Cottagers leapfrog them to automatic promotion. With Leicester only holding relegated Burnley to a 0–0 draw at home, it gave Fulham a chance to do so at Derby County but with only a win required. An incident involving a spectator and a Fulham player led to the game being abandoned 2 minutes away from the 90 minute mark with Fulham losing 1–0 at the Baseball Ground. An enquiry from the Football League was held for a few days and they decided eventually the result from the Derby-Fulham game would stand which meant the Foxes were promoted after 2 seasons in the second tier.

== Competitions ==
=== Football League Division Two ===
==== League Table ====
Pos	Team	Pld	W	D	L	GF	GA	GD	Pts	Relegation
1	Queens Park Rangers (C, P)	42	26	7	9	77	36	+41	85	Promotion to the First Division
2	Wolverhampton Wanderers (P)	42	20	15	7	68	44	+24	75	Promotion to the First Division
3	Leicester City (P)	42	20	10	12	72	44	+28	70	Promotion to the First Division
4	Fulham	42	20	9	13	64	47	+17	69	
5	Newcastle United	42	18	13	11	75	53	+22	67	

Rules for classification: 1) Points; 2) Goal difference; 3) Goals scored
(C) Champions; (P) Promoted

Leicester City's score comes first

Win	Draw	Loss

==== Position by round ====
Round	1	2	3	4	5	6	7	8	9	10	11	12	13	14	15	16	17	18	19	20	21	22	23	24	25	26	27	28	29	30	31	32	33	34	35	36	37	38	39	40	41	42
Ground	H	A	A	H	A	H	H	A	A	H	A	H	H	H	A	A	H	A	H	H	H	A	A	A	A	H	A	H	H	A	A	H	H	A	A	A	H	A	H	H	H	A
Result	L	W	D	L	W	L	L	W	W	W	W	L	L	D	L	L	W	W	W	D	W	L	W	L	L	W	L	W	W	D	W	D	D	W	W	D	W	W	D	D	W	D
Position	16	5	8	12	9	11	13	11	7	6	7	7	8	8	12	15	10	9	6	5	4	5	4	5	5	4	6	5	4	4	4	4	4	4	4	4	4	4	4	3	3	3

Source: https://www.11v11.com/teams/leicester-city/tab/matches/season/1983/
A = Away; H = Home; W = Win; D = Draw; L = Loss; = Division Two Champions, Promoted to 1983–84 Football League Division One; = Promoted to 1983–84 Football League Division One; = Relegated to Division Three

==== Matches ====
28 August 1982 1	Leicester City	1–2	Charlton Athletic	Leicester
	B Smith		27' Walker; 50' Walker	Stadium: Filbert Street; Attendance: 11,038

31 August 1982 2	Rotherham United	3–1	Leicester City	Rotherham
	Gow 44'		Melrose 10'; A Smith, 48'; Lineker 88'	Stadium: Millmoor; Attendance: 9,254

4 September 1982 3	Chelsea	1–1	Leicester City	Fulham
15:00	Droy 50'		Lineker 85'	Stadium: Stamford Bridge; Attendance: 14,127; Referee: Axcell

8 September 1982 4	Leicester City	0–1	Leeds United	Leicester
			73' Butterworth	Stadium: Filbert Street; Attendance: 12,963

11 September 1982 5	Leicester City	6–0	Carlisle United	Leicester
	Lynex 23' (pen.); 25'; 83' (pen.); Lineker 47', 69', 87' (pen.)			Stadium: Filbert Street; Attendance: 8,440

18 September 1982 6	Blackburn Rovers	1–3	Leicester City	Blackburn
	Garner 16'; Bell 70'; Barton 84'		A Smith 82'	Stadium: Ewood Park; Attendance: 4,963

25 September 1982 7	Leicester City	0–1	Queens Park Rangers	Leicester
			67' O'Neill	Stadium: Filbert Street; Attendance: 10,647

2 October 1982 8	Shrewsbury Town	2–0	Leicester City	Shrewsbury
			MacDonald 35'; O'Neill 56'	Stadium: Gay Meadow; Attendance: 5,223

9 October 1982 9	Leicester City	2–0	Grimsby Town	Leicester
	Lynex, 59'; Lineker 70'	7		Stadium: Filbert Street; Attendance: 9,640

16 October 1982 10	Wolverhampton Wanderers	3–0	Leicester City	Wolverhampton
		6	Wilson, 30'; Lineker, 34'; English 89'	Stadium: Molineux; Attendance: 15,782

23 October 1982 11	Derby County	4–0	Leicester City	Derby
		7	Lineker 24'; 81' Lineker; 89' Lineker; A Smith 51'	Stadium: Baseball Ground; Attendance: 13,191

30 October 1982 12	Leicester City	0–2	Sheffield Wednesday	Leicester
		7	10' Mirosevic; 87' Shelton	Stadium: Filbert Street; Attendance: 17,341

6 November 1982 13	Cambridge United	1–3	Leicester City	Cambridge
	Lockhart 19'; Reilly 27'; Finney 34'	8	Lineker 11'	Stadium: Abbey Stadium; Attendance: 5,011

13 November 1982 14	Leicester City	2–2	Newcastle United	Leicester
	English 43'; Lineker 61'	8	17', 72' Kevin Keegan	Stadium: Filbert Street; Attendance: 15,044

20 November 1982 15	Leicester City	0–1	Crystal Palace	Leicester
		12	65' Mabbutt	Stadium: Filbert Street; Attendance: 8,616

27 November 1982 16	Bolton Wanderers	1–3	Leicester City	Bolton
	Foster 26'; Doyle 43'; Thompson 52'	15	Wilson 68'	Stadium: Burnden Park; Attendance: 5,060

4 December 1982 17	Leicester City	2–0	Fulham	Leicester
	Buchanan, 80'; Lineker 86'	10		Stadium: Filbert Street; Attendance: 9,082

11 December 1982 18	Burnley	4–2	Leicester City	Turf Moor
	Steven 11'; Taylor 50'	9	Lineker 40'; Lynex 54' (pen.); A Smith 70'; 74'	Attendance: 6,503

18 December 1982 19	Leicester City	2–1	Oldham Athletic	Leicester
	MacDonald 56' (pen.); A Smith 60'	6	84' Wylde	Stadium: Filbert Street; Attendance: 8,125

27 December 1982 20	Middlesbrough	1–1	Leicester City	Middlesbrough
	Bell 60' (pen.)	5	49'Lineker	Stadium: Ayresome Park; Attendance: 12,665

28 December 1982 21	Leicester City	1–0	Barnsley	Leicester
	A Smith 6'			Stadium: Filbert Street; Attendance: 14,838

1 January 1983 22	Crystal Palace	0–1	Leicester City	Croydon (London)
	Goal			Stadium: Selhurst Park; Attendance: 8,801

3 January 1983 23	Leicester City	3–0	Chelsea	Leicester
	Lineker (2), A Smith			Stadium: Filbert Street; Attendance: 13,745

15 January 1983 24	Charlton Athletic	1–2	Leicester City	Charlton (London)
	Goal		Wilson	Stadium: The Valley; Attendance: 5,971

22 January 1983 25	Leicester City	0–1	Blackburn Rovers	Leicester
			Goal	Stadium: Filbert Street; Attendance: 8,361

5 February 1983 26	Carlisle United	1–0	Leicester City	Brunton Park
			MacDonald	Attendance: 4,402

19 February 1983 27	Grimsby Town	0–2	Leicester City	Blundell Park
	Goal			Attendance: 6,963

22 February 1983 28	Leicester City	3–2	Shrewsbury Town	Leicester
	Lineker (2), Wilson		Goal	Stadium: Filbert Street; Attendance: 6,155

26 February 1983 29	Leicester City	5–0	Wolverhampton Wanderers	Leicester
	Lynex (2), A Smith, Lineker, Daly			Stadium: Filbert Street; Attendance: 13,530

5 March 1983 30	Leicester City	1–1	Derby County	Leicester
	Lynex		Goal	Stadium: Filbert Street; Attendance: 15,452

19 March 1983 31	Leicester City	4–0	Cambridge United	Leicester
	A Smith (2), Lynex ( 0' (pen.); Wilson			Stadium: Filbert Street; Attendance: 8,305

22 March 1983 32	Sheffield Wednesday	2–2	Leicester City	Sheffield
	Goal		MacDonald, A Smith	Stadium: Hillsborough; Attendance: 14,036

26 March 1983 33	Newcastle United	2–2	Leicester City	Newcastle-upon-Tyne
	Goal		Lineker	Stadium: St. James' Park; Attendance: 22,692

2 April 1983 34	Barnsley	1–2	Leicester City	Oakwell
	Goal		Wilson, English	Attendance: 13,278

5 April 1983 35	Leicester City	1–0	Middlesbrough	Leicester
	O'Neill			Stadium: Filbert Street; Attendance: 12,025

9 April 1983 36	Queens Park Rangers	2–2	Leicester City	Shepherd's Bush
	Goal		Lineker,	Stadium: Loftus Road; Attendance: 16,301

16 April 1983 37	Leicester City	3–1	Rotherham United	Leicester
	Wilson, Lineker (2),		Goal	Stadium: Filbert Street; Attendance: 12,978

23 April 1983 38	Fulham	0–1	Leicester City	Fulham
			Wilson	Stadium: Craven Cottage; Attendance: 24,251

30 April 1983 39	Leicester City	0–0	Bolton Wanderers	Leicester
				Stadium: Filbert Street; Attendance: 13,959

2 May 1983 40	Leeds United	2–2	Leicester City	Leeds
	Goal		A Smith, May	Stadium: Elland Road; Attendance: 14,442

7 May 1983 41	Oldham Athletic	1–2	Leicester City	Oldham
	Goal		Jones, Ramsey	Stadium: Boundary Park; Attendance: 9,088

14 May 1983 42	Leicester City	0–0	Burnley	Leicester
				Stadium: Filbert Street; Attendance: 29,453

=== FA Cup ===
Round	Date	Opponent	Venue	Result	Attendance	Goalscorers
R3	8 January 1983	Notts County	H	2–3	18,384	A Smith, Wilson

=== League Cup ===
Round	Date	Opponent	Venue	Result	Attendance	Goalscorers
R2 1st leg	6 October 1982	Lincoln City	A	0–2	6,775	
R2 2nd leg	27 October 1982	Lincoln City	H	0–1 (lost 0–3 on agg)	10,000	

== Squad ==
Note: Flags indicate national team as defined under FIFA eligibility rules; some limited exceptions apply. Players may hold more than one non-FIFA nationality.

Pos.	Nation	Player
GK	ENG	Mark Wallington
MF	NIR	Paul Ramsey
DF	SCO	Paul Friar
MF	SCO	Kevin MacDonald
DF	ENG	Larry May
DF	NIR	John O'Neill
MF	ENG	Steve Lynex
FW	ENG	Gary Lineker
FW	ENG	Alan Smith
FW	SCO	Jim Melrose
DF	SCO	Bobby Smith
MF	SCO	Eddie Kelly

Pos.	Nation	Player
FW	ENG	Tommy English
MF	SCO	Ian Wilson
DF	IRL	Jimmy Holmes
FW	ENG	Dave Buchanan
DF	ENG	Norman Leet
DF	SCO	Tommy Williams
DF	ENG	Paul Brown
FW	ENG	Keith Robson
MF	IRL	Gerry Daly (on loan from Coventry City)
MF	ENG	Andy Peake
FW	ENG	Robbie Jones
