= 1975–76 Rangers F.C. season =

Rangers
1975-76 season
- Chairman: Matt Taylor (until September); Rae Simpson (from September)
- Manager: Jock Wallace
- Ground: Ibrox Park
- Scottish Premier Division: 1st P36 W23 D8 L5 F60 A24 Pts54
- Scottish Cup: Winners
- League Cup: Winners
- European Cup: Second round
- Glasgow Cup: Winners
- Top goalscorer: League: Derek Johnstone (31); All: Derek Johnstone (16)
Home colours	Away colours	Third colours

The 1975–76 season was the 96th season of competitive football by Rangers.

== Overview ==
Rangers played a total of 55 competitive matches during the 1975–76 season. The club won a third domestic treble in its history and, what would become, the first of two in three seasons.

This was the first season of the new Scottish Premier Division and the previous season's league flag was hoisted much to the delight of the home support in front of the visitors who just happened to be Celtic. A tense match ensued and although the visitors took the lead, Derek Johnstone equalised and Quinton Young netted the winner. The side did not continue this good form and only won five, and lost five, of the next fourteen league matches. On 13 December the club embarked on a 26 match unbeaten run in the league and cup competitions.

Despite Celtic still having a one-point lead as late as February, Rangers eventually clinched the league at Tannadice, thanks to a Johnstone goal after just 22 seconds, during the third last league match of the season. The side had won 16 out of the final 21 matches. The final margin of the title win was six points.

On the domestic cup front, the League Cup was won in the October against Celtic in a lunchtime Old Firm final, which were a feature of that time in trying to curb crowd violence. An Alex McDonald flying header in the second half, being the difference between the sides. The 1976 Scottish Cup Final saw Rangers play Heart of Midlothian. The side got off to a great start when Johnstone netted on 42 seconds. It was all but over when Alex McDonald scored right on the stroke of half time and Derek Johnstone grabbed Rangers' third goal late on.

== Results ==
All results are written with Rangers' score first.

=== Scottish Premier Division ===
Date	Opponent	Venue	Result	Attendance	Scorers
30 August 1975	Celtic	H	2–1	69,594	Johnstone, Young
6 September 1975	Heart of Midlothian	A	2–0	28,000	Anderson (o.g.), Murray (o.g.)
13 September 1975	St. Johnstone	H	2–0	25,000	Stein, Johnstone
20 September 1975	Hibernian	H	1–1	37,000	Blackley (o.g.)
27 September 1975	Dundee	A	0–0	15,087	
4 October 1975	Aberdeen	H	1–0	22,000	McDougall
11 October 1975	Ayr United	A	0–3	20,000	
18 October 1975	Motherwell	A	1–2	18,925	Johnstone
1 November 1975	Celtic	A	1–1	60,000	Parlane
8 November 1975	Heart of Midlothian	H	1–2	30,000	Henderson
12 November 1975	Dundee United	H	4–1	25,760	Parlane, Johnstone, Jackson, MacDonald
15 November 1975	St. Johnstone	A	5–1	9,500	Parlane, McKean, McLean, Jardine, McDonald (o.g.)
22 November 1975	Hibernian	A	1–2	26,547	Young
29 November 1975	Dundee	H	2–1	16,500	Henderson (2)
6 December 1975	Aberdeen	A	0–1	19,565	
13 December 1975	Ayr United	H	3–0	15,500	Jardine (pen.), Henderson, McKean
20 December 1975	Motherwell	H	3–2	25,000	Johnstone (2), Henderson
27 December 1975	Dundee United	A	0–0	11,500	
1 January 1976	Celtic	H	1–0	57,839	Johnstone
3 January 1976	Heart of Midlothian	A	2–1	24,000	Henderson (2)
10 January 1976	St. Johnstone	H	4–0	20,209	Miller (pen.), Hamilton, Johnstone, McKean
17 January 1976	Hibernian	H	2–0	40,761	Parlane, McLean
31 January 1976	Dundee	A	1–1	14,407	Johnstone
7 February 1976	Aberdeen	H	2–1	35,000	Henderson, MacDonald
21 February 1976	Ayr United	A	1–0	18,000	McKean
28 February 1976	Motherwell	A	1–0	25,241	Johnstone
20 March 1976	Heart of Midlothian	H	3–1	31,698	Johnstone, Jackson, McLean
27 March 1976	St. Johnstone	A	3–0	9,079	Johnstone (2), Greig
3 April 1976	Hibernian	A	3–0	18,820	MacDonald, Henderson, Johnstone
10 April 1976	Dundee	H	3–0	25,012	McKean, Greig, Johnstone
14 April 1976	Aberdeen	A	0–0	17,968	
17 April 1976	Ayr United	H	2–1	25,602	MacDonald, Parlane
21 April 1976	Motherwell	H	2–1	27,910	McLean, Henderson
24 April 1976	Dundee United	A	1–0	17,000	Johnstone
26 April 1976	Celtic	A	0–0	51,000	
4 May 1976	Dundee United	H	0–0	50,209	

=== European Cup ===
Date	Round	Opponent	Venue	Result	Attendance	Scorers
17 September 1975	R1	Bohemian	H	4–1	25,000	Fyfe, O'Hara, Johnstone, Burke (o.g.)
1 October 1975	R1	Bohemian	A	1–1	8,000	Johnstone
22 October 1975	R2	Saint-Etienne	A	0–2	28,394	
5 November 1975	R2	Saint-Etienne	H	1–2	51,411	MacDonald

=== Scottish Cup ===
Date	Round	Opponent	Venue	Result	Attendance	Scorers
24 January 1976	R3	East Fife	H	3–0	30,106	MacDonald, Henderson, Hamilton
14 February 1976	R4	Aberdeen	H	4–1	60,244	Johnstone, MacDonald, Henderson, Parlane
6 March 1976	QF	Queen of the South	A	5–0	18,700	McKean (2), Johnstone (2), Henderson
31 March 1976	SF	Motherwell	N	3–2	50,915	Miller (pen.), Johnstone (2)
1 May 1976	F	Heart of Midlothian	N	3–1	85,354	Johnstone (2), MacDonald

=== League Cup ===
Date	Round	Opponent	Venue	Result	Attendance	Scorers
9 August 1975	SR	Airdrieonians	H	6–1	45,000	Jardine (3, 2 pen.), Stein, Parlane, Miller (pen.)
13 August 1975	SR	Clyde	A	1–0	28,000	Johnstone
16 August 1975	SR	Motherwell	H	1–1	31,500	Greig
20 August 1975	SR	Clyde	H	6–0	16,000	Parlane (2), Jackson, Miller (pen.), Young, Johnstone
23 August 1975	SR	Motherwell	A	2–2	20,561	Jardine, Miller (pen.)
27 August 1975	SR	Airdrieonians	A	2–1	20,000	Johnstone, Young
10 September 1975	QF	Queen of the South	H	1–0	12,000	Johnstone
24 September 1975	QF	Queen of the South	A	2–2	7,500	Johnstone, MacDonald
8 October 1975	SF	Montrose	N	5–1	20,319	Parlane, Johnstone, Miller (pen.), Scott, Jardine
25 October 1975	F	Celtic	N	1–0	58,806	MacDonald

== Appearances ==
Player	Position	Appearances	Goals
(Scotland) Gordon Boyd	FW	1	0
(Scotland) Ally Dawson	DF	6	0
(Scotland) Jim Denny	DF	12	0
(Scotland) Tom Forsyth	MF	37	0
(Scotland) Graham Fyfe	MF	6	1
(Scotland) John Greig	DF	55	3
(Scotland) Johnny Hamilton	MF	27	2
(Scotland) Martin Henderson	FW	33	13
(Scotland) Colin Jackson	DF	52	3
(Scotland) Sandy Jardine	DF	37	7
(Scotland) Derek Johnstone	DF	51	31
(Scotland) Stewart Kennedy	GK	14	0
(Scotland) Peter McCloy	GK	41	0
(Scotland) Alex MacDonald	MF	52	8
(Scotland) Ian McDougall	DF	7	1
(Scotland) Bobby McKean	MF	43	7
(Scotland) Tommy McLean	MF	52	4
(Scotland) Alex Miller	DF	44	6
(Scotland) Alex O'Hara	MF	7	1
(Scotland) Derek Parlane	FW	40	10
(Scotland) Quinton Young	MF	19	4
(Scotland) Ally Scott	FW	3	1
(Scotland) Colin Stein	FW	15	2

== League table ==
Pos	Team	Pld	W	D	L	GF	GA	GD	Pts	Qualification or relegation
1	Rangers (C)	36	23	8	5	60	24	+36	54	Qualification for the European Cup first round
2	Celtic	36	21	6	9	71	42	+29	48	Qualification for the UEFA Cup first round
3	Hibernian	36	18	7	11	55	43	+12	43	Qualification for the UEFA Cup first round
4	Motherwell	36	16	8	12	57	49	+8	40	
5	Heart of Midlothian	36	13	9	14	39	45	−6	35	Qualification for the Cup Winners' Cup first round

Source: Statto
Rules for classification: 1) points; 2) goal difference; 3) number of goals scored.
(C) Champions

== See also ==
- 1975–76 in Scottish football
- 1975–76 Scottish Cup
- 1975–76 Scottish League Cup
- 1975–76 European Cup
