= 1977–78 Rangers F.C. season =

Rangers
1977–78 season
- Chairman: Rae Simpson
- Manager: Jock Wallace
- Ground: Ibrox Park
- Scottish Premier Division: 1st P36 W24 D7 L5 F76 A39 Pts55
- Scottish Cup: Winners
- League Cup: Winners
- Cup Winners' Cup: First round
- Glasgow Cup: Not completed
- Tennent Caledonian Cup: Runners-up
- Top goalscorer: League: Derek Johnstone (25); All: Derek Johnstone (38)

The 1977–78 season was the 98th season of competitive football by Rangers.

== Overview ==
Rangers played a total of 53 competitive matches during the 1977–78 season. Wallace presided over the club's fourth domestic treble and second in three years. During the close season Rangers spent heavily in the transfer market, bringing in Davie Cooper from Clydebank for £100,000 and Gordon Smith from Kilmarnock for £65,000. They were joined at the club by Bobby Russell who arrived from Shettleston Juniors for free.

However, even with these expensive signings the side did not make the best start to the league campaign, losing the opening two matches to Aberdeen and Hibernian. Order was restored the following week with a 4–0 defeat of Partick Thistle. A resounding 3–2 win over Celtic in the first Old Firm match of the season set the tone of the season. Rangers had been 2–0 down at half-time but recovered to win the game after outclassing Jock Stein's side in the second 45 minutes. In March 1978, second placed Aberdeen won 3–0 at Ibrox to set up a tense title run in. Rangers dropped seven points from twenty-one but held on winning the final four fixtures and the league.

The League Cup was won by defeating Celtic 2–1 after extra time. Goals from season new boys Davie Cooper and Gordon Smith completed the first leg of the treble. The 2–1 1978 Scottish Cup final win over Aberdeen made Wallace the first and only Rangers' manager to win two domestic trebles. Surprisingly despite this unprecedented success Wallace resign from his position on 23 May 1978.

== Results ==
All results are written with Rangers' score first.

=== Scottish Premier Division ===
Date	Opponent	Venue	Result	Attendance	Scorers
13 August 1977	Aberdeen	A	1–3	21,500	Russell
20 August 1977	Hibernian	H	0–2	20,800	
27 August 1977	Partick Thistle	A	4–0	18,584	Smith (2), Miller (pen.), Russell
10 September 1977	Celtic	H	3–2	48,788	Smith (2), Johnstone
17 September 1977	St. Mirren	A	3–3	26,000	Jardine, Cooper, Johnstone
24 September 1977	Ayr United	H	2–0	20,402	Smith (2)
1 October 1977	Clydebank	H	4–1	23,250	Cooper (2), Smith (2)
8 October 1977	Dundee United	A	1–0	18,658	Russell
15 October 1977	Motherwell	A	4–1	20,050	Johnstone (3), Smith
22 October 1977	Aberdeen	H	3–1	40,102	Jardine (pen.), Smith, MacDonald
29 October 1977	Hibernian	A	1–0	22,750	Jardine (pen.)
5 November 1977	Partick Thistle	H	3–3	28,200	Parlane (2), MacDonald
12 November 1977	Celtic	A	1–1	57,000	Johnstone
19 November 1977	St. Mirren	H	2–1	25,000	Johnstone, Miller (pen.)
26 November 1977	Ayr United	A	5–0	15,300	Johnstone (3), Jackson, Parlane
10 December 1977	Dundee United	H	2–0	25,000	McLean, Smith
17 December 1977	Motherwell	H	3–1	15,300	Smith (2), Johnstone
24 December 1977	Aberdeen	A	0–4	21,000	
31 December 1977	Hibernian	H	0–0	25,000	
2 January 1978	Partick Thistle	A	2–1	30,000	Johnstone, Smith
7 January 1978	Celtic	H	3–1	54,302	Smith, Grieg, Parlane
14 January 1978	St. Mirren	A	2–0	24,300	Johnstone, Smith
4 February 1978	Clydebank	H	1–0	16,492	Johnstone
19 February 1978	Clydebank	A	3–0	10,000	Johnstone (2), Cooper
25 February 1978	Motherwell	A	5–3	20,387	Johsntone (2), Smith, Cooper, McVie (o.g.)
4 March 1978	Aberdeen	H	0–3	34,500	
21 March 1978	Partick Thistle	H	2–1	20,000	MacDonald, Jardine
25 March 1978	Celtic	A	0–2	51,000	
29 March 1978	Hibernian	A	1–1	21,245	Parlane
1 April 1978	St. Mirren	H	1–1	20,500	Johnstone
8 April 1978	Ayr United	A	5–2	13,400	Johnstone (2), Smith (2), Greig
12 April 1978	Ayr United	H	1–1	12,282	Johnstone
15 April 1978	Clydebank	A	2–0	9,800	Johnstone (2)
19 April 1978	Dundee United	A	1–0	17,293	Johnstone
22 April 1978	Dundee United	H	3–0	27,050	Jackson, Jardine (pen.), Cooper
29 April 1978	Motherwell	H	2–0	43,500	Jackson, Smith

=== Cup Winners' Cup ===
Date	Round	Opponent	Venue	Result	Attendance	Scorers
17 August 1977	QR	Young Boys Bern	H	1–0	30,000	Greig
31 August 1977	QR	Young Boys Bern	A	2–2	21,000	Johnstone, Smith
14 September 1977	R1	FC Twente	H	0–0	40,000	
28 September 1977	R1	FC Twente	A	0–3	20,000	

=== Scottish Cup ===
Date	Round	Opponent	Venue	Result	Attendance	Scorers
28 January 1978	R3	Berwick Rangers	A	4–2	10,500	Jackson (2), Johnstone (2)
18 February 1978	R4	Stirling Albion	H	1–0	15,500	Johnstone
11 March 1978	QF	Kilmarnock	H	4–1	28,000	Johnstone, Hamilton, MacDonald, Cooper (pen.)
5 April 1978	SF	Dundee United	N	2–0	25,619	Johnstone, Greig
6 May 1978	F	Aberdeen	N	2–1	61,563	MacDonald, Johnstone

=== League Cup ===
Date	Round	Opponent	Venue	Result	Attendance	Scorers
24 August 1977	R2	St. Johnstone	H	3–1	10,000	Johnstone (2), Parlane
3 September 1977	R2	St. Johnstone	A	3–0	11,200	Parlane, Miller (pen.), Smith
5 October 1977	R3	Aberdeen	H	6–1	25,000	Smith (3), Johnstone, Miller (pen.), MacDonald
26 October 1977	R3	Aberdeen	A	1–3	15,600	Smith
9 November 1977	QF	Dunfermline Athletic	H	3–1	12,000	McLean (2), Jackson
16 November 1977	QF	Dunfermline Athletic	A	3–1	8,274	Greig, Jardine (pen.), Johnstone
27 February 1978	SF	Forfar Athletic	N	5–2	12,799	Johnstone (2), Parlane (2), MacDonald
18 March 1978	F	Celtic	N	2–1	60,158	Cooper, Smith

=== Non-competitive ===
==== Tennent Caledonian Cup ====
Date	Round	Opponent	Venue	Result	Attendance	Scorers
6 August 1977	SF	Southampton	H	1-3		
7 August 1977	F	West Bromwich Albion	H	0–2		

==== Glasgow Cup ====
Date	Round	Opponent	Venue	Result	Attendance	Scorers
18 October 1977	SF	Partick Thistle	H	2–2*✝	9,202	Forsyth, McLean

*Rangers won the match 4–3 on penalties ✝Competition not completed

== Appearances ==
Player	Position	Appearances	Goals
(Scotland) Peter McCloy	GK	21	0
(Scotland) Sandy Jardine	DF	48	6
(Scotland) Alex Miller	DF	36	5
(Scotland) Tom Forsyth	DF	46	0
(Scotland) Colin Jackson	DF	51	6
(Scotland) Alex MacDonald	MF	59	7
(Scotland) Billy MacKay	MF	3	0
(Scotland) Bobby Russell	MF	48	3
(Scotland) Derek Parlane	FW	31	8
(Scotland) Chris Robertson	FW	4	0
(Scotland) Davie Cooper	MF	52	8
(Scotland) Bobby McKean	MF	15	0
(Scotland) Tommy McLean	MF	44	3
(Scotland) Gordon Smith	FW	52	27
(Scotland) Derek Johnstone	FW	47	38
(Scotland) John Greig	DF	41	5
(Scotland) Kenny Watson	MF	8	0
(Scotland) Stewart Kennedy	GK	32	0
(Scotland) Ally Dawson	DF	2	0
(Scotland) Johnny Hamilton	MF	3	0
(Scotland) Eric Morris	DF	1	0
(Scotland) Martin Henderson	FW	2	0

== League table ==
Pos	Team	Pld	W	D	L	GF	GA	GD	Pts	Qualification or relegation
1	Rangers (C)	36	24	7	5	76	39	+37	55	Qualification for the European Cup first round
2	Aberdeen	36	22	9	5	68	29	+39	53	Qualification for the Cup Winners' Cup first round
3	Dundee United	36	16	8	12	42	32	+10	40	Qualification for the UEFA Cup first round
4	Hibernian	36	15	7	14	51	43	+8	37	Qualification for the UEFA Cup first round
5	Celtic	36	15	6	15	63	54	+9	36	

Source: Statto
Rules for classification: 1) points; 2) goal difference; 3) number of goals scored.
(C) Champions

== See also ==
- 1977–78 in Scottish football
- 1977–78 Scottish Cup
- 1977–78 Scottish League Cup
- 1977–78 European Cup Winners' Cup
