= 1978–79 Rangers F.C. season =

Rangers
1978–79 season
- Chairman: Rae Simpson
- Manager: John Greig
- Ground: Ibrox Park
- Scottish Premier Division: 2nd P36 W18 D9 L9 F52 A35 Pts45
- Scottish Cup: Winners
- League Cup: Winners
- European Cup: Quarter-finals
- Glasgow Cup: Winners
- Tennent Caledonian Cup: Winners
- Top goalscorer: League: Gordon Smith (11); All: Gordon Smith (18)

The 1978–79 season was the 99th season of competitive football by Rangers.

== Overview ==
Rangers played a total of 61 competitive matches during the 1978–79 season. The early season league form was terrible as the team failed to win any of the first six league matches but a run was put together. Things began to unravel, however, as leadership of the league evaporated. The team had to settle for second place behind champions Celtic. The pivotal match was a 4–2 Old Firm defeat a Parkhead. There was success for Greig in the national cup competitions. Victory in the 1979 Scottish Cup Final over Hibernian required a second replay to separate the sides before Rangers eventually won 3–2. The 1979 Scottish League Cup Final ended in a 2–1 win for Rangers over a strong Aberdeen with goals from Alex MacDonald and Colin Jackson.

Wallace's treble-winning team of the previous season performed well in the European Cup. Rangers eliminated Juventus after defeating the Italians 2–1 on aggregate – the first time Rangers had ever recovered from a first-leg defeat to win a two-legged European tie. Dutch side PSV Eindhoven, the then UEFA Cup holders, were overcome in the next round (the club's first home defeat in European competition), before an injury-stricken Rangers side lost to Cologne at the quarter-final stage.

== Results ==
All results are written with Rangers' score first.

=== Scottish Premier Division ===
Date	Opponent	Venue	Result	Attendance	Scorers
12 August 1978	St Mirren	H	0–1	28,000	
19 August 1978	Hibernian	A	0–0	23,000	
26 August 1978	Partick Thistle	H	0–0	24,500	
9 September 1978	Celtic	A	1–3	60,000	Parlane
16 September 1978	Aberdeen	H	1–1	27,000	A. Forsyth (pen.)
23 September 1978	Greenock Morton	A	2–2	16,500	Parlane, Johnstone
30 September 1978	Motherwell	H	4–1	26,000	Smith (2), McLean, Johnstone
7 October 1978	Dundee United	H	1–1	27,000	A. MacDonald
14 October 1978	Heart of Midlothian	A	0–0	18,159	
21 October 1978	St Mirren	A	1–0	26,000	A. Forsyth (pen)
28 October 1978	Hibernian	H	2–1	24,750	A. Forsyth (pen), Smith
4 November 1978	Partick Thistle	A	0–1	20,641	
11 November 1978	Celtic	H	1–1	52,330	A. Forsyth (pen)
18 November 1978	Aberdeen	A	0–0	26,000	
25 November 1978	Greenock Morton	H	3–0	21,500	Johnstone, Cooper, Smith
9 December 1978	Dundee United	A	0–3	15,247	
16 December 1978	Heart of Midlothian	H	5–3	16,250	Johnstone (4), Watson
23 December 1978	St Mirren	H	1–0	22,500	Johnstone
20 January 1979	Greenock Morton	A	2–0	16,312	A. MacDonald, Watson
10 February 1979	Dundee United	H	1–0	23,500	Robertson
24 February 1979	Heart of Midlothian	A	2–3	16,500	Smith, Parlane
14 March 1979	Hibernian	H	1–0	16,000	Smith
17 March 1979	Partick Thistle	A	2–0	18,685	Cooper, Urquhart
27 March 1979	St Mirren	A	2–1	20,000	Urquhart (2)
7 April 1979	Greenock Morton	H	1–1	15,750	Cooper
10 April 1979	Motherwell	H	3–0	12,000	Cooper, A. MacDonald, Smith
14 April 1979	Motherwell	A	0–2	14,612	
21 April 1979	Dundee United	A	2–1	20,264	Dawson, Smith
25 April 1979	Aberdeen	A	1–2	20,000	Smith
28 April 1979	Heart of Midlothian	H	4–0	20,050	Russell (3), Parlane
2 May 1979	Motherwell	A	2–1	13,052	Smith, Jackson
5 May 1979	Celtic	H	1–0	52,841	A. MacDonald
7 May 1979	Aberdeen	H	2–0	32,000	Smith, Cooper
21 May 1979	Celtic	A	2–4	52,000	A. MacDonald, Russell
23 May 1979	Partick Thistle	H	1–0	6,087	Johnstone
31 May 1979	Hibernian	A	1–2	5,000	Urquhart

=== European Cup ===
Date	Round	Opponent	Venue	Result	Attendance	Scorers
13 September 1978	R1	Juventus	A	0–1	70,000	
27 September 1978	R1	Juventus	H	2–0	44,000	A. MacDonald, Smith
18 October 1978	R2	PSV Eindhoven	H	0–0	44,000	
1 November 1978	R2	PSV Eindhoven	A	3–2	29,000	A. MacDonald, Johnstone, Russell
6 March 1979	QF	Cologne	A	0–1	50,000	
22 March 1979	QF	Cologne	H	1–1	44,000	McLean

=== Scottish Cup ===
Date	Round	Opponent	Venue	Result	Attendance	Scorers
12 February 1979	R3	Motherwell	H	3–1	19,000	Johnstone, Jackson, Cooper
21 February 1979	R4	Kilmarnock	H	1–1	17,500	A. MacDonald
26 February 1979	R4 R	Kilmarnock	A	1–0	19,493	Urquhart
10 March 1979	QF	Dundee	H	6–3	28,000	Jardine (pen.), A. MacDonald, Smith, T.Forsyth, Russell, Cooper
4 April 1979	SF	Partick Thistle	N	0–0	26,232	
16 April 1979	SF R	Partick Thistle	N	1–0	32,294	Johnstone
12 May 1979	F	Hibernian	N	0–0	50,610	
16 May 1979	F R	Hibernian	N	0–0	33,504	
28 May 1979	F 2R	Hibernian	N	3–2	30,602	Johnstone (2), Duncan (o.g.)

=== League Cup ===
Date	Round	Opponent	Venue	Result	Attendance	Scorers
16 August 1978	R1	Albion Rovers	H	3–0	10,000	Parlane, Johnstone, Smith
23 August 1978	R1	Albion Rovers	A	1–0	6,500	Parlane
30 August 1978	R2	Forfar Athletic	H	3–0	9,000	Cooper, McLean, Smith
2 September 1978	R2	Forfar Athletic	A	4–1	5,919	Smith (2), A. MacDonald, Cooper
4 October 1978	R3	St Mirren	H	3–2	20,000	Cooper, Miller, Johnstone
11 October 1978	R3	St Mirren	A	0–0	24,000	
8 November 1978	QF	Arbroath	H	1–0	10,000	Wells (o.g.)
15 November 1978	QF	Arbroath	A	2–1	4,000	Smith, Russell
13 December 1978	SF	Celtic	N	3–2	49,432	Jardine (pen.), Jackson, Casey (o.g.)
31 March 1979	F	Aberdeen	N	2–1	60,000	A. MacDonald, Jackson

=== Non-competitive ===
==== Tennent Caledonian Cup ====
Date	Round	Opponent	Venue	Result	Attendance	Scorers
5 August 1978	SF	Hearts	H	3–1		
6 August 1978	F	Southampton	H	4–1		

==== Glasgow Cup ====
Date	Round	Opponent	Venue	Result	Attendance	Scorers
24 March 1979	SF	Partick Thistle	H	3–3*	9,250	Urquhart, McDonald
17 May 1979	F	Celtic	H	3–1	3,000	J. MacDonald, Forsyth, Strickland

*Rangers won the match 4–3 on penalties

== Appearances ==
Player	Position	Appearances	Goals
(Scotland) Peter McCloy	GK	61	0
(Scotland) Sandy Jardine	DF	60	2
(Scotland) Alex Forsyth	DF	29	4
(Scotland) Tom Forsyth	DF	33	1
(Scotland) Colin Jackson	DF	46	4
(Scotland) Alex MacDonald	MF	58	11
(Scotland) Tommy McLean	MF	56	3
(Scotland) Bobby Russell	MF	61	7
(Scotland) Derek Johnstone	FW	53	16
(Scotland) Gordon Smith	FW	57	18
(Scotland) Kenny Watson	MF	22	2
(Scotland) Billy Urquhart	FW	20	5
(Scotland) Derek Parlane	FW	43	6
(Scotland) Alex Miller	DF	33	1
(Scotland) Davie Cooper	MF	49	10
(Scotland) Ally Dawson	DF	36	1
(Scotland) Chris Robertson	FW	2	1
(Scotland) John MacDonald	FW	2	0
(Scotland) Davie Armour	DF	3	0
(Scotland) Billy MacKay	MF	1	0
(Scotland) Eric Morris	DF	1	0
(Scotland) Derek Strickland	FW	2	0
(Scotland) Jim Denny	DF	3	0

== League table ==
Pos	Team	Pld	W	D	L	GF	GA	GD	Pts	Qualification or relegation
1	Celtic (C)	36	21	6	9	61	37	+24	48	Qualification for the European Cup first round
2	Rangers	36	18	9	9	52	35	+17	45	Qualification for the Cup Winners' Cup first round
3	Dundee United	36	18	8	10	56	37	+19	44	Qualification for the UEFA Cup first round
4	Aberdeen	36	13	14	9	59	36	+23	40	Qualification for the UEFA Cup first round
5	Hibernian	36	12	13	11	44	48	−4	37	

Source: Statto and RSSSF
Rules for classification: 1) points; 2) goal difference; 3) number of goals scored.
(C) Champions

== See also ==
- 1978–79 in Scottish football
- 1978–79 Scottish Cup
- 1978–79 Scottish League Cup
- 1977–78 European Cup
