= 1980–81 Partick Thistle F.C. season =

Partick Thistle
1980–81 season
- Chairman: Miller Reid
- Manager: Bertie Auld; Peter Cormack
- Stadium: Firhill Stadium
- Premier Division: 6th
- Scottish Cup: Fourth round
- League Cup: Quarter-finals
- Top goalscorer: League: Tony Higgins (7); Alex O'Hara (7); All: Alex O'Hara (11)
- Highest home attendance: 18,000 vs Celtic, Scottish League Cup, 8 October 1980
- Lowest home attendance: 1,600 vs Kilmarnock, Scottish Premier Division, 21 February 1981
- Average home league attendance: 5,791

The 1980–81 season saw Partick Thistle compete in the Scottish Premier Division, the top tier of Scottish football, where they finished 6th on 30 points. They also competed in the Scottish Cup, where they were eliminated in the fourth round, and the Scottish League Cup, where they were eliminated in the quarter-finals.

== Season summary ==
After Bertie Auld left to manage Hibernian in November 1980, Peter Cormack was appointed as manager on 5 December 1980.

They finished 6th on 30 points.

== Competitions ==
=== Scottish Premier Division ===
==== League table ====
Pos	Team	Pld	W	D	L	GF	GA	GD	Pts	Qualification or relegation
4	St Mirren	36	18	8	10	56	47	+9	44	
5	Dundee United	36	17	9	10	66	42	+24	43	Qualification for the UEFA Cup first round
6	Partick Thistle	36	10	10	16	32	48	−16	30	
7	Airdrieonians	36	10	9	17	36	55	−19	29	
8	Morton	36	10	8	18	36	58	−22	28	

Source: Statto
Rules for classification: 1) points; 2) goal difference; 3) number of goals scored.

==== Matches ====
Win	Draw	Loss

Scottish Premier Division results
Date	Opponent	Venue	Result F–A	Scorers	Attendance
9 August 1980	Heart of Midlothian	Home	3–2	Higgins, Gibson, Liddell (o.g.)	4,000
16 August 1980	Rangers	Away	0–4	—	26,000
23 August 1980	Kilmarnock	Home	0–1	—	4,000
6 September 1980	Celtic	Away	1–4	Gibson	20,000
13 September 1980	St Mirren	Home	1–0	Clark	4,000
20 September 1980	Aberdeen	Home	0–1	—	6,000
27 September 1980	Morton	Away	2–1	O'Hara, Watson	5,000
4 October 1980	Airdrieonians	Home	2–1	Higgins (2)	5,000
11 October 1980	Dundee United	Away	0–0	—	4,706
18 October 1980	Heart of Midlothian	Away	1–0	Jardine	5,905
25 October 1980	Rangers	Home	1–1	Park	14,000
1 November 1980	Kilmarnock	Away	1–0	O'Hara	2,500
8 November 1980	Morton	Home	0–0	—	3,000
15 November 1980	Aberdeen	Away	1–2	O'Hara	10,000
22 November 1980	Dundee United	Home	2–3	Clark, O'Hara	4,000
29 November 1980	Airdrieonians	Away	0–0	—	3,500
6 December 1980	Celtic	Home	0–1	—	12,436
13 December 1980	St Mirren	Away	0–1	—	5,626
20 December 1980	Aberdeen	Home	1–1	Watson (pen.)	4,000
27 December 1980	Morton	Away	0–2	—	6,000
1 January 1981	Rangers	Away	1–1	O'Hara	17,000
3 January 1981	Heart of Midlothian	Home	1–0	Watson (pen.)	3,500
10 January 1981	Airdrieonians	Home	1–0	Park	3,000
31 January 1981	St Mirren	Home	0–0	—	4,000
21 February 1981	Kilmarnock	Home	1–1	McDonald	1,600
28 February 1981	Heart of Midlothian	Away	1–1	Higgins	3,491
7 March 1981	Airdrieonians	Away	0–2	—	3,000
14 March 1981	Dundee United	Home	0–2	—	3,500
18 March 1981	Celtic	Away	1–4	Park	15,000
28 March 1981	Morton	Home	3–1	Watson, Higgins, Rooney (o.g.)	2,000
1 April 1981	Aberdeen	Away	1–3	Watson	9,000
5 April 1981	Celtic	Home	0–1	—	17,196
11 April 1981	St Mirren	Away	2–3	Higgins (2)	4,445
18 April 1981	Kilmarnock	Away	1–0	Clark	1,250
25 April 1981	Rangers	Home	1–1	Whittaker	9,000
2 May 1981	Dundee United	Away	2–3	O'Hara (2)	4,124

=== Scottish Cup ===
Win	Draw	Loss

Scottish Cup results
Round	Date	Opponent	Venue	Result F–A	Scorers	Attendance
Third round	24 January 1981	Clyde	Home	2–2	Whittaker, Clark	4,200
Third round replay	28 January 1981	Clyde	Away	4–2	O'Hara (2), Clark (2)	4,100
Fourth round	14 February 1981	Dundee United	Away	0–1	—	7,758

=== Scottish League Cup ===
Win	Draw	Loss

Scottish League Cup results
Round	Date	Opponent	Venue	Result F–A	Scorers	Attendance
Second round, first leg	27 August 1980	Queen's Park	Home	3–1	Higgins (2), O'Hara	2,000
Second round, second leg	30 August 1980	Queen's Park	Away	1–1	Watson	1,472
Third round, first leg	3 September 1980	St Mirren	Home	2–0	Gibson (2)	4,000
Third round, second leg	24 September 1980	St Mirren	Away	0–0	—	5,700
Quarter-finals, first leg	8 October 1980	Celtic	Home	0–1	—	18,000
Quarter-finals, second leg	20 October 1980	Celtic	Away	1–2 (a.e.t.)	O'Hara	12,000
