= Derek Johnstone =

Scottish footballer and manager

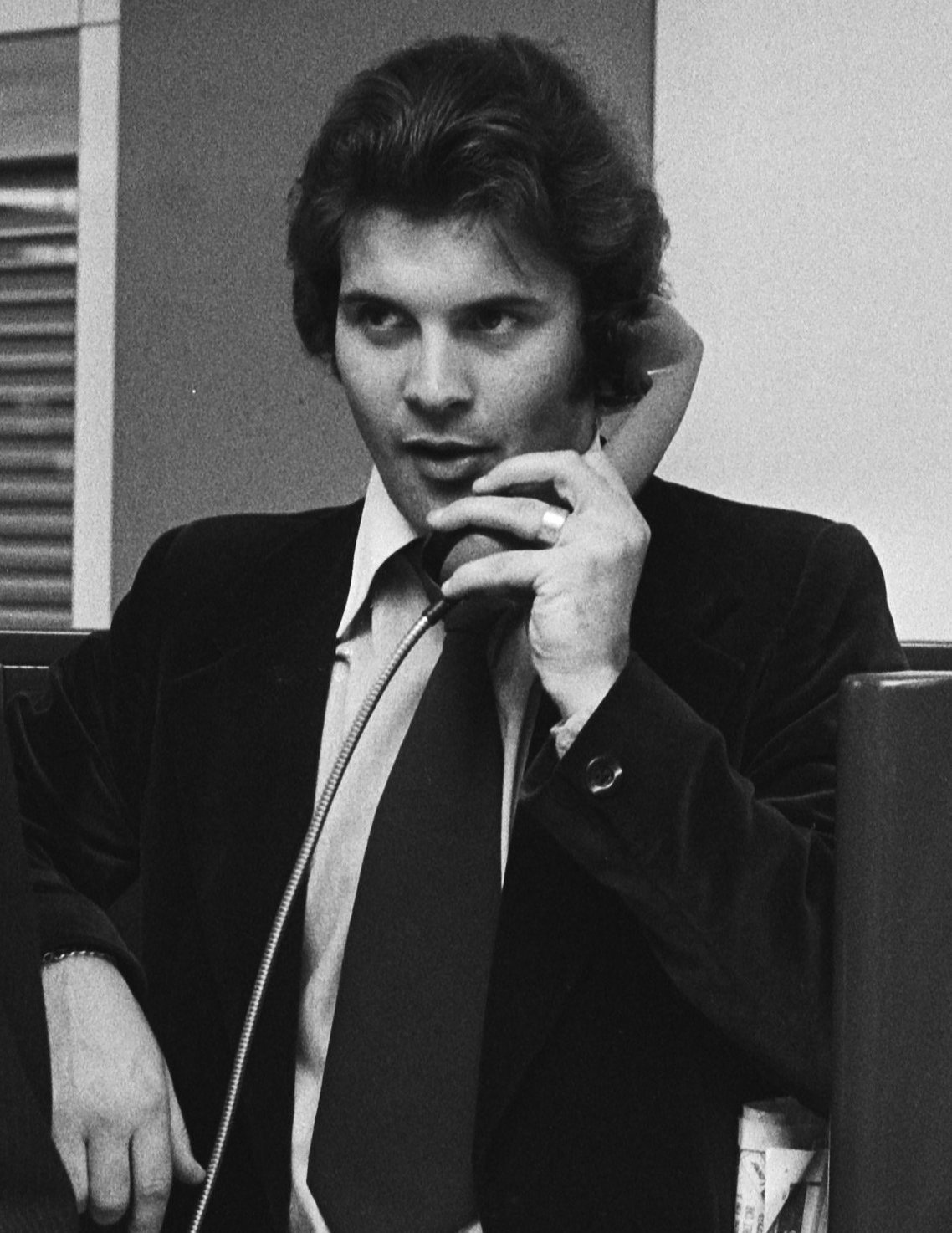
- Johnstone at Schipol Airport while travelling with the Rangers squad, 1978

Personal information
- Full name: Derek Joseph Johnstone
- Date of birth: 4 November 1953 (age 72)
- Place of birth: Dundee, Scotland
- Height: 6 ft 0 in (1.83 m)
- Positions: Defender; striker

Youth career
- 1968–1970: Rangers

Senior career*
Years	Team	Apps	(Gls)
1970–1983	Rangers	350	(131)
1983–1985	Chelsea	4	(0)
1983	→ Dundee United (loan)	4	(0)
1985–1986	Rangers	19	(1)
1986–1987	Partick Thistle	4	(0)
Total		377	(132)

International career
1973–1979	Scotland	14	(2)
1973–1974	Scottish League XI	2	(0)

Managerial career
- 1986–1987: Partick Thistle
- * Club domestic league appearances and goals

Derek Joseph Johnstone (born 4 November 1953) is a Scottish former football player and manager.

Johnstone played mainly for Rangers winning 14 major trophies during his career. He also had a spell at Chelsea and a brief stint in management with Partick Thistle. He mainly played as a striker but could also perform in central defence, and in midfield. Uniquely, he was selected to play in defence, midfield, and attack for Scotland.

== Playing career ==
=== Club ===
==== Rangers ====
Johnstone signed for Rangers as a schoolboy in 1968. He turned professional in 1970 and made his debut on 19 September 1970, aged 16 years and 319 days. Johnstone scored two goals in that match, a 5–0 victory against Cowdenbeath.

Johnstone thrust himself into the limelight just five weeks later when his header secured a 1–0 victory over Celtic in the 1970 Scottish League Cup Final. Johnstone was still 16 at the time, but the faith shown in his ability by manager Willie Waddell paid off handsomely, as Rangers claimed their first major trophy for just over four years.

Despite his heroics against Celtic, Johnstone found regular first-team outings in the number '9' jersey hard to come by, largely due to the presence of Colin Stein, Scotland's first £100,000 player, although he did score 11 goals in 16 league appearances during the 1971–72 season. He compensated for his lack of frontline action by often playing as a centre-back when either Ronnie McKinnon or Colin Jackson was injured, and when the duo were ruled out of the 1972 European Cup Winners' Cup Final, Johnstone (still only 18) deputised in the match against Dynamo Moscow.

Johnstone soon became a regular in the starting line-up, and he picked up a Scottish Cup winners' medal in 1973 when Rangers defeated Celtic 3–2 at Hampden Park. Johnstone played a huge role in the winning goal, rising above the Celtic defence to head a Tommy McLean free-kick towards goal, and when his header struck both posts, Tam Forsyth was on hand to nudge the rebound over the line. The McLean-Johnstone combination that created this famous goal was a hallmark of Rangers' play in the 1970s.

Johnstone eventually picked up a league championship medal at the end of the 1974–75 campaign, as Rangers ended Celtic's nine-year reign as champions of Scotland, and he was an integral part of The Gers' domestic treble success a year later. He scored a total of 31 goals in 51 appearances, including two in a 3–1 win over Hearts in the 1976 Scottish Cup Final. He scored his first, a typical header, after just 42 seconds and thus earned himself a unique place in the annals of Scottish football: the referee had actually kicked off the match early, so Johnstone had actually hit the net before the allotted 3pm kick-off time had been reached.

Although 1976–77 was a barren season for Rangers, they came back strongly in 1977–78 by winning their second treble inside three years. Johnstone was the outstanding performer in what was an exceptional Rangers side, scoring thirty-eight goals over the course of the campaign and picking up the Scottish Football Writers' Player of the Year accolade.

With Arsenal and Tottenham Hotspur reportedly interested in luring Rangers' top marksman to London, Johnstone submitted a transfer request in the summer of 1978. He was seeking a new challenge in his career, but the intervention of new Rangers manager John Greig persuaded Johnstone to stay in Glasgow. He was named club captain, and in his first season with the armband, he almost led the Ibrox side to an unprecedented second successive treble; only a last-gasp 4–2 defeat against Celtic at Parkhead denied Rangers the Championship, but Johnstone did get his hands on the Scottish Cup – he scored twice in the Final's second replay against Hibernian – and the League Cup, beating Aberdeen.

That season was to be the high point for the John Greig era, and Rangers' fortunes dipped badly thereafter. They did win the Scottish Cup in 1981 and the Scottish League Cup in 1982, but found themselves playing second fiddle in the Premier Division to Celtic and the emerging New Firm of Aberdeen and Dundee United.

==== Chelsea ====
Having been placed on the transfer list by Greig in April 1983, Johnstone left Rangers after the 1983 Scottish Cup Final defeat against Aberdeen to join Chelsea for a £30,000 transfer fee. Signed in September 1983, Johnstone provided extra cover in the Chelsea squad which won the Second Division title in 1984. He failed to dislodge the established forward duo of Kerry Dixon and David Speedie and made just four appearances, with a month on loan to Dundee United during the 1983–84 season.

==== Return to Rangers ====
He was tempted back to Ibrox by Jock Wallace in January 1985 for £25,000. He returned to a Rangers side that was in the midst of a doleful period in their history, and it was hoped that the return of a former favourite could galvanise an ailing team. However, it failed to work out and after 23 appearances and one goal, Johnstone was handed a free transfer when Graeme Souness took over the reins at Ibrox in the summer of 1986.

=== International ===
Johnstone made his debut in a British Home Championship match against Wales. Despite Johnstone's rich vein of scoring form in 1978, he was overlooked by Ally MacLeod during Scotland's ill-fated World Cup campaign in Argentina. Although he was a member of the squad, he did not start any of the three matches that the Scots played.

== Managerial career ==
Johnstone had a short spell as player-manager of Partick Thistle during the 1986–87 season, before leaving professional football in 1987.

== Media work ==
Since leaving Partick Thistle, Johnstone has worked in the football media, including for BBC Scotland, Scottish Television, Radio Clyde, GO Radio and Real Radio Scotland, where he co-presented the station's football phone-in until the end of the 2011–12 season. He also co-commentates on Rangers matches for the club's TV channel.

== Career statistics ==
=== Club ===
Club	Season	League			National Cup		League Cup		Europe		Total	
Club	Season	Division	Apps	Goals	Apps	Goals	Apps	Goals	Apps	Goals	Apps	Goals
Rangers
Rangers	1970–71	Scottish First Division	17	6	2	1	1	1	1	0	21	8
Rangers	1971–72	Scottish First Division	17	7	7	1	6	4	5	0	35	12
Rangers	1972–73	Scottish First Division	31	4	6	1	8	5	2	0	47	10
Rangers	1973–74	Scottish First Division	31	1	2	0	9	0	2	1	44	2
Rangers	1974–75	Scottish First Division	27	14	2	0	6	2	0	0	35	16
Rangers	1975–76	Scottish Premier Division	33	16	4	7	10	6	4	2	51	31
Rangers	1976–77	Scottish Premier Division	27	15	5	1	8	5	2	0	42	21
Rangers	1977–78	Scottish Premier Division	33	25	5	6	8	6	1	1	47	38
Rangers	1978–79	Scottish Premier Division	31	9	8	4	10	2	4	1	53	16
Rangers	1979–80	Scottish Premier Division	33	15	6	3	2	1	6	2	47	21
Rangers	1980–81	Scottish Premier Division	26	4	4	2	3	1	–	0	33	7
Rangers	1981–82	Scottish Premier Division	28	9	4	4	8	3	2	0	42	16
Rangers	1982–83	Scottish Premier Division	16	6	1	0	5	3	4	2	26	11
Chelsea
Chelsea	1983–84	English Second Division	2	0	0	0	0	0	—		2	0
Chelsea	1984–85	English First Division	2	0	0	0	0	0	—		2	0
Dundee United (loan)
Dundee United (loan)	1983–84	Scottish Premier Division	1	0	0	0	2	2	0	0	3	2
Rangers
Rangers	1984–85	Scottish Premier Division	11	1	1	–	–	–	–	–	12	1
Rangers	1985–86	Scottish Premier Division	8	0	—		1	0	2	0	11	0
Career total			374	132	57	30	87	41	35	9	553	212

=== International appearances ===
Appearances and goals by national team and year
National team	Year	Apps	Goals
Scotland	1973	5	0
Scotland	1974	1	0
Scotland	1975	1	0
Scotland	1976	3	0
Scotland	1978	3	2
Scotland	1979	1	0
Total		14	2

=== International goals ===
Scores and results list Scotland's goal tally first.

#	Date	Venue	Opponent	Score	Result	Competition
1.	13 May 1978	Glasgow, Scotland	Northern Ireland	1–1	1–1	British Home Championship
2.	17 May 1978	Glasgow, Scotland	Wales	1–0	1–1	British Home Championship

== Honours ==
=== Club ===
Rangers

- UEFA Cup Winners' Cup: 1971–72
- Scottish League First Division/Premier Division: 1974–75, 1975–76, 1977–78
- Scottish Cup: 1972–73, 1975–76, 1977–78, 1978–79, 1980–81
- Scottish League Cup: 1970–71, 1975–76, 1977–78, 1978–79, 1981–82

=== Individual ===
- SPFA Players' Player of the Year: 1977–78
- SFWA Footballer of the Year: 1977–78
- Scottish Football Hall of Fame: 2008
