= Gordon Boyd (disambiguation) =

Gordon Boyd (1922–2009) was an English actor.

Gordon Boyd may also refer to:

- Gordon Boyd (footballer) (born 1958), Scottish footballer
- Gordon Boyd (rugby union) (1905–1980), Scotland rugby union player
