= Martin Henderson (footballer) =

Scottish footballer

Personal information
- Full name: William Martin Melville Henderson
- Date of birth: 3 May 1956 (age 70)
- Place of birth: Kirkcaldy, Scotland
- Height: 6 ft 0 in (1.83 m)
- Position: Forward

Senior career*
Years	Team	Apps	(Gls)
1974–1978	Rangers	33	(10)
1977–1978	→ Hibernian (loan)	6	(0)
1978	Philadelphia Fury	17	(3)
1978–1981	Leicester City	91	(12)
1981–1983	Chesterfield	87	(23)
1983–1984	Port Vale	27	(7)
- Spalding United
1991–1992	Bourne Town	20	(2)
Total		281+	(57+)
- * Club domestic league appearances and goals

William Martin Melville Henderson (born 3 May 1956) is a Scottish former footballer who played in Scotland, England, and the United States. A forward, he scored 52 goals in 244 league games in a ten-year career in the Football League and the Scottish Football League.

He started his career at Rangers in 1974 and went on to win the Premier Division title in 1975–76 and 1977–78, as well as the Scottish Cup in 1976. He was loaned out to Hibernian, before joining American club Philadelphia Fury in 1978. He then spent three years with Leicester City, winning the Second Division title in 1979–80. He joined Chesterfield in 1981 before being traded to Port Vale in October 1983. However, he was sacked the next year after failing to report for training and later played for Spalding United and Bourne Town.

== Career ==
Henderson started his career with Jock Wallace's Rangers, scoring 13 goals in 33 appearances in the 1975–76 season after getting his first goal in a 2–1 defeat to Hearts at Ibrox. He was a member of the 1976 Scottish Cup winning first XI, helping "Gers" beat Hearts 3–1 at Hampden Park in front of 85,354 spectators. Rangers also won the Premier Division title. However, he scored only one goal in 12 games in 1976–77 as Rangers finished second in the league. He played just twice in the 1977–78 season, and was loaned out to Eddie Turnbull's Hibernian. He scored one goal in six Premier Division games for "Hibs" during his loan spell at Easter Road.

Henderson moved to the United States to play in the North American Soccer League for Philadelphia Fury in 1978. He scored three goals in 17 games at Veterans Stadium for Alan Ball's side. He then moved to England to play for Leicester City in the 1978–79 season, who were managed by his former boss Jock Wallace. He scored six league and cup goals for the "Foxes" in the 1979–80 season, as City won the Second Division title. He scored four goals in the 1980–81 campaign, as Leicester were relegated straight back out of the First Division. He scored 16 goals in 100 league and cup appearances in his three years at Filbert Street.

Henderson moved on to Frank Barlow's Chesterfield, who finished 11th in the Third Division in 1981–82 before dropping out of the division in last place in 1982–83. He scored 23 goals in 87 league games at Saltergate. He joined Port Vale in exchange for Bob Newton and £8,000 in October 1983. He was partnered with Eamonn O'Keefe, and scored seven goals in 28 games in the 1983–84 season. The "Valiants" were relegated to the Fourth Division and manager John McGrath lost his job and was replaced by his assistant John Rudge. Henderson was not a popular player with fans, as he had arrived in exchange for a popular player and the club failed to win in his first 18 games. He then failed to turn up for pre-season training at Vale Park for the next season and the club cancelled his contract. He moved on to non-League with Spalding United and Bourne Town.

== Career statistics ==
Appearances and goals by club, season and competition
Club	Season	League			National cup (Note: Includes Scottish Cup, U.S. Open Cup, FA Cup)		Other		Total	
Club	Season	Division	Apps	Goals	Apps	Goals	Apps	Goals	Apps	Goals
Rangers	1975–76	Scottish Premier Division	26	10	5	3	4	0	35	13
Rangers	1976–77	Scottish Premier Division	7	0	0	0	5	1	12	1
Rangers	1977–78	Scottish Premier Division	0	0	0	0	2	0	2	0
Rangers	Total		33	10	5	3	11	1	49	14
Hibernian (loan)	1977–78	Scottish Premier Division	6	0	0	0	2	1	8	1
Philadelphia Fury	1978	NASL	17	3	—		—		17	3
Leicester City	1978–79	Second Division	33	4	2	2	0	0	35	6
Leicester City	1979–80	Second Division	36	5	2	1	2	0	40	6
Leicester City	1980–81	First Division	22	3	1	1	2	0	24	4
Leicester City	Total		91	12	5	4	4	0	100	16
Chesterfield	1981–82	Third Division	44	13	2	1	1	0	47	14
Chesterfield	1982–83	Third Division	40	10	1	0	5	0	46	10
Chesterfield	1983–84	Fourth Division	3	0	0	0	1	0	4	0
Chesterfield	Total		87	23	3	1	7	0	97	24
Port Vale	1983–84	Third Division	27	7	1	0	0	0	28	7
Career total			261	55	14	8	24	2	299	65

== Honours ==
Rangers

- Scottish Football League Premier Division: 1975–76 & 1977–78
- Scottish Cup: 1976

Leicester City

- Football League Second Division: 1979–80
