= Dave Richardson (footballer) =

English footballer (born 1932)

Personal information
- Full name: David Richardson
- Date of birth: 11 March 1932 (age 94)
- Place of birth: Billingham, England
- Position: Full-back

Senior career*
Years	Team	Apps	(Gls)
1949–1955	Leicester City	2	(0)
1955–1960	Grimsby Town	175	(1)
1960–1961	Swindon Town	0	(0)
1961–1963	Barrow	31	(0)
1963–1964	Oadby Town		
1964–1965	Kettering Town		
1965–196?	Oadby Town		
- * Club domestic league appearances and goals

David Richardson (born 11 March 1932) was an English professional footballer who played as a full-back.

Richardson joined Aston Villa in 1976 as Youth Development Officer.

In 1980 Richardson joined Leicester City as Youth Team Manager, unwittingly bringing paedophile, Ted Langford, from his old club to become a scout for Leicester. When both returned to Villa, Richardson secured schoolboy player Steve Froggatt from Leicester.
