= Mark Goodwin (footballer) =

English footballer

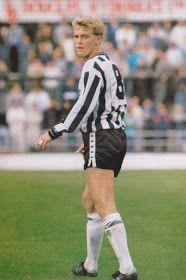
- Meadow Lane, 1983

Personal information
- Full name: Mark Adrian Goodwin
- Date of birth: 23 February 1960 (age 66)
- Place of birth: Sheffield
- Height: 5 ft 10 in (1.78 m)
- Positions: Midfielder; full back

Senior career*
Years	Team	Apps	(Gls)
1977–1981	Leicester City	91	(8)
1981–1987	Notts County	237	(23)
1987–1989	Walsall	92	(2)
1989–1990	Kettering Town		
1990–1992	Eastwood Town		
1992–1994	Arnold Town	82	(14)
1994–?	Hucknall Town		
- * Club domestic league appearances and goals

Mark Goodwin (born 23 February 1960) is an English former professional footballer who played as a midfielder. He attended Bosworth Community College in Leicestershire.

== Career ==
He was a professional midfielder with Leicester City, Notts County and Walsall.

He was given his Foxes début as a 17-year-old by Frank McLintock in a 1–0 defeat at Ipswich Town on 17 December 1977. Goodwin scored his first goal for Leicester City on 27 December 1977, away at Old Trafford in a 3–1 defeat to Manchester United He became a regular when Jock Wallace was the Leicester manager often playing at full-back. During the 1979–80 season he was part of the Leicester City side that won the Second Division title. He left Leicester City to join Notts County for £60,000 towards the climax of the 1980–81 as County were promoted to the First Division. He made 237 appearances for the Magpies scoring 23 goals. In 1988 he was promoted with a third club, as Walsall defeated Bristol City 4–0 at Fellows Park to earn promotion to the second tier, with Goodwin's corner being headed home by Phil Hawker to make it 3–0. He was released by Walsall in 1990. He then joined Kettering Town in the Football Conference.

He joined Eastwood Town where he was appointed temporary manager in November 1991. His next club was Arnold Town where he was a player-coach. He made his début on 29 February 1992 in a 1–0 Central Midland League defeat at Lincoln United. His first goal followed on 21 March 1992 in a 3–2 defeat at Harworth Colliery Institute. He left Arnold to join Hucknall Town during the 1994–95 close season.

== Honours ==
Walsall

- Football League Third Division play-offs: 1988
