= Ian McDonald (footballer, born 1958) =

Scottish footballer

Personal information
- Date of birth: 26 December 1958 (age 67)
- Place of birth: Glasgow, Scotland
- Position: Midfielder

Youth career
- –: Eastercraigs

Senior career*
Years	Team	Apps	(Gls)
1976–1984	Partick Thistle	139	(10)
1984–1985	Motherwell	13	(4)
1985–1989	Partick Thistle	122	(15)
1989	→ Stranraer (loan)	4	(0)
1989–1994	Greenock Morton	108	(3)
Total		386	(32)
- * Club domestic league appearances and goals

Ian McDonald (born 26 December 1958) is a Scottish former footballer who scored 32 goals from 386 appearances in the Scottish League playing for Partick Thistle, Motherwell, Stranraer and Greenock Morton. He played as a midfielder.
