= John Stalker (footballer) =

Scottish footballer

Personal information
- Full name: John Alexander Hastie Inglis Stalker
- Date of birth: 12 March 1959 (age 67)
- Place of birth: Musselburgh, Scotland
- Height: 5 ft 11 in (1.80 m)
- Position: Forward

Senior career*
Years	Team	Apps	(Gls)
197?–1979	Leicester City	0	(0)
1979–1983	Darlington	116	(36)
1983	Hartlepool United	4	(0)
1983	Meadowbank Thistle	5	(0)
1984	East Fife	11	(1)
1984–198?	Penicuik Athletic		
198?–1986	Newtongrange Star		(4)
- * Club domestic league appearances and goals

John Alexander Hastie Inglis Stalker (born 12 March 1959) is a Scottish former footballer who played as a forward. He began his senior career in England with Leicester City, but moved on to Darlington, for whom he scored 36 goals from 116 appearances in the Football League. After a short spell with Hartlepool United, Stalker returned to his native Scotland, where he played in the Scottish League for Meadowbank Thistle and East Fife before moving into junior football with Penicuik Athletic and Newtongrange Star.
