= Steve Humphries =

English footballer

Steven Humphries
Personal information
- Full name: Stephen Rodney Humphries
- Date of birth: 29 May 1961 (age 65)
- Place of birth: Kingston Upon Hull, England
- Position: Goalkeeper

Youth career
- Leicester City

Senior career*
Years	Team	Apps	(Gls)
1978–1981	Leicester City	0	(0)
1978	→ Vancouver Whitecaps (loan)	1	(0)
1981–1982	Doncaster Rovers	13	(0)
1982	Cardiff City	1	(0)
1982–1983	Wrexham	2	(0)
1983	Oldham Athletic	0	(0)
1983	Leicester City	0	(0)
- Kettering Town
1985–1988	Barnet	111	(0)

International career
1987	England Semi-Pro	1	(0)
- * Club domestic league appearances and goals

Stephen Rodney Humphries (born 29 May 1961) is an English former footballer who played as a goalkeeper.

== Career ==
A product of the Leicester City youth team, Humphries would sign professional for Leicester in 1978, however made no league appearances with the club.

After leaving Leicester in 1981, he would have a spell with Vancouver Whitecaps, before returning to Britain for spells in the English Football League with Doncaster Rovers, Cardiff City, Wrexham and Oldham Athletic.

He would return to Leicester City in 1982, however once again did not make a league appearances for them.

After that he would move to non-league Kettering Town before moving to Barnet in 1986.

In 1987 he would be capped by England Semi-Pro.

In 1994 Humphries would become a sports marketing manager in the city of Leicester, during which he was bid director for Leicester to secure the 8th National Special Olympics GB Summer Games in 2009 – which he was appointed Games Director of.
