= Derek Strickland =

Scottish footballer

Personal information
- Full name: Derek Strickland
- Date of birth: 7 November 1959 (age 66)
- Place of birth: Stoneyburn, Scotland
- Position: Striker

Senior career*
Years	Team	Apps	(Gls)
1978–1979	Rangers	1	(0)
1979–1981	Leicester City	7	(2)
1981–1982	Hearts	1	(0)
1982–1983	East Stirlingshire	15	(1)

Managerial career
- Whitburn
- 2012-2013: Bathgate Thistle
- 2016-2023: Armadale Thistle
- * Club domestic league appearances and goals

Derek Strickland (born 7 November 1959) is a Scottish former professional footballer.

Strickland joined Rangers in 1978 and made his debut for the club on 23 August that year in a League Cup match away to Albion Rovers. His second, and final, appearance for the club came at the end of that season in a 2-1 league defeat to Hibernian. In 1979 Strickland joined Leicester City and made seven league appearances, scoring twice. He moved on to have an unsuccessful stint with Hearts then played with East Stirlingshire before leaving the senior football ranks. He later joined Stoneyburn before playing for and managing Whitburn for a number of years.

Strickland took over as manager of Bathgate Thistle in April 2012 but resigned in June 2013.

He was appointed manager of Armadale Thistle in 2016 but retired from football in 2023. His son, Colin, took over the role as manager following his retirement.
