= Peter Welsh (Scottish footballer) =

Scottish footballer

Personal information
- Full name: Peter Martin Welsh
- Date of birth: 19 July 1959 (age 67)
- Place of birth: Coatbridge, Scotland
- Position: Defender

Senior career*
Years	Team	Apps	(Gls)
1976–1982	Leicester City	41	(4)
1982–1984	Hibernian	12	(0)
1983	→ Falkirk (loan)	9	(0)
1984	→ Alloa Athletic (loan)	2	(0)
- Nuneaton Borough
Total		64	(4)
- * Club domestic league appearances and goals

Peter Martin Welsh (born 19 July 1959) is a Scottish former footballer, who played for Leicester City in the Football League and Hibernian, Falkirk and Alloa Athletic in the Scottish Football League.
