= Paul Edmunds (footballer) =

English footballer and manager

Personal information
- Date of birth: 2 December 1957 (age 68)
- Place of birth: Doncaster, England
- Position: Right winger

Youth career
- Troston Welfare

Senior career*
Years	Team	Apps	(Gls)
1979–1981	Leicester City	8	(2)
1981–1982	AFC Bournemouth	14	(2)
1982–1983	Bentley Victoria		
1983–1986	Grantham Town		
- Burton Albion
- Goole Town
- Armthorpe Welfare

Managerial career
- 1987–1988: Doncaster Belles (joint with Mick Sherrard)
- 1988–1991: Doncaster Belles
- 1992–1995: Doncaster Belles
- * Club domestic league appearances and goals

Paul Edmunds (born 2 December 1957) is an English former professional footballer and manager.

== Playing career ==
A pacy winger, Edmunds trained as a teacher in Sunderland and was called into Great Britain's 1979 World Student Games squad. From here he was spotted by Leicester City and signed as a professional.

Edmunds made his debut against Sunderland at Roker Park, then scored in his first home game against Shrewsbury Town.

While playing for Leicester Edmunds broke his wrist in a challenge from Joey Jones and was released in 1981 after suffering further injuries. He was signed by AFC Bournemouth but released again after a single season.

== Coaching career ==
In 1983 Edmunds began working at a school alongside Sheila Stocks, the founder and captain of Doncaster Belles. After the pair became an item, Edmunds attended pre-season training with the Belles in 1984. When he criticised their methods, he was challenged to do better and found himself coaching at the club. Edmunds married Sheila in 1986 and took over as Doncaster Belles manager the following year.

At the time Doncaster Belles were the pre-eminent women's football team in England, who reached 11 FA Cup finals out of twelve from 1983 to 1994.

Edmunds resigned in 1995 after heavily criticising the Football Association's running of the women's game and the efforts of then-England women manager Ted Copeland.
