= Gordon Boyd (footballer) =

Scottish footballer

Personal information
- Full name: Gordon Boyd
- Date of birth: 27 March 1958 (age 68)
- Place of birth: Glasgow, Scotland
- Height: 5 ft 8 in (1.73 m)
- Position: Midfielder

Senior career*
Years	Team	Apps	(Gls)
1974–1978	Rangers	1	(0)
1977–1978	→ Morton (loan)	1	(0)
1978–1980	Fulham	3	(0)
1980	Rangers	1	(0)
1980–1982	Barnsley	2	(0)
1982	Scunthorpe United F.C.	11	(0)
- * Club domestic league appearances and goals

Gordon Boyd (born 27 March 1958) is a Scottish former professional footballer who is best known for his time with Rangers.

== Career ==
Boyd played for amateur boys clubs Glasgow United AFC and Eastercraigs AFC before he was signed by Rangers as a 12-year-old in 1970. He became the youngest ever player to sign Scottish Football Association schoolboy forms for Rangers. An under 15 Scottish schoolboy international, in 1974-75 Boyd played for the Scotland under-18 team in a European Championship match against Denmark at Rugby Park, Kilmarnock. The following year (1975–76) Boyd helped the Scotland under-18s, managed by Andy Roxburgh, win a tournament in Cannes. Scotland beat Finland and Italy and drew with Brazil in the group phase. Boyd then scored the only goal in the final, as Scotland won against the host nation France.

Boyd also had spells with Fulham, Barnsley and Scunthorpe United, but never fulfilled his early potential. He finished his playing career at semi professional non-league Goole Town in 1986.
