= David Buchanan (footballer, born 1962) =

English footballer (born 1962)

Personal information
- Full name: David Buchanan
- Date of birth: 23 June 1962 (age 64)
- Place of birth: Newcastle upon Tyne, England
- Height: 5 ft 9 in (1.75 m)
- Position: Striker

Youth career
- –1979: Leicester City

Senior career*
Years	Team	Apps	(Gls)
1979–1983	Leicester City	33	(7)
1982	→ Northampton Town (loan)	5	(0)
1983–	Peterborough United	16	(4)
- North Shields
- Blyth Spartans
1986–1988	Sunderland	34	(8)
1987	→ York City (loan)	7	(2)
- Newcastle Blue Star
Total		95	(21)

International career
1979	England Youth	3	(0)
1986	England semi-pro	2	(0)
- * Club domestic league appearances and goals

David Buchanan (born 23 June 1962) is an English former professional footballer who played as a striker in the Football League for Leicester City, Northampton Town, Peterborough United, Sunderland and York City, and in non-League football for North Shields, Blyth Spartans and Newcastle Blue Star. He represented the England national youth team in 1979 and earned two caps with the semi-professional national team in 1986.
