= Jim Denny (footballer) =

Scottish footballer

Personal information
- Full name: James Denny
- Date of birth: 13 March 1950 (age 76)
- Place of birth: Paisley, Scotland
- Position: Defender

Senior career*
Years	Team	Apps	(Gls)
1970	Yoker Athletic		
1970–1979	Rangers	37	(0)
1979–1981	Hearts	53	(0)
1981–1982	Stirling Albion	20	(0)
1982–1983	Irvine Victoria		
1983–1984	Dalry Thistle		
1984–1987	Troon		
Total		110	(0)
- * Club domestic league appearances and goals

Jim Denny (born 13 March 1950 in Paisley, Scotland) is a Scottish retired professional footballer.

Denny joined Rangers in 1970 from junior side Yoker Athletic. He made his debut in the Scottish Cup final replay against Celtic on 12 May 1971. He deputised at right back in place of Sandy Jardine, but the team lost the match 2–1.

In total he made 54 appearances for Rangers including the first match of the 1971–72 European Cup Winners' Cup campaign, a 1–1 draw with Stade Rennes. He left Ibrox in 1979 after seven seasons and joined Hearts. He was played more in Edinburgh in two seasons than he had in the seven he was at Rangers. His spell at Tynecastle was followed by a final season at Stirling Albion before left the senior ranks to join Irvine Victoria. He later joined Dalry Thistle before spending a final few seasons at Troon, where he was Player of the Year in 1984-85 under Manager Davie McIlroy.
