= Steve Lynex =

English footballer

Personal information
- Full name: Steven Charles Lynex
- Date of birth: 23 January 1958 (age 68)
- Place of birth: West Bromwich, England
- Height: 5 ft 9 in (1.75 m)
- Position: Winger

Youth career
- 1974–1977: West Bromwich Albion

Senior career*
Years	Team	Apps	(Gls)
1977	West Bromwich Albion	0	(0)
1977–1979	Shamrock Rovers	41	(14)
1979–1981	Birmingham City	46	(10)
1981–1987	Leicester City	213	(57)
1986	→ Birmingham City (loan)	10	(2)
1987–1988	West Bromwich Albion	29	(3)
1988–1990	Cardiff City	62	(2)
1990–1991	Telford United	7	(0)
- * Club domestic league appearances and goals

Steven Charles Lynex (born 23 January 1958) is an English former professional footballer who made 360 appearances in the Football League playing for Birmingham City, Leicester City, West Bromwich Albion and Cardiff City, and played in the League of Ireland and in the UEFA Cup Winners' Cup for Shamrock Rovers. He played as a winger.

== Career ==
Lynex was born in West Bromwich. He attended Churchfields School and played junior football for Sandwell Rangers before joining West Bromwich Albion in 1974 as an apprentice. In 1976, he was part of the Albion side that won the FA Youth Cup, and in January 1977 manager Johnny Giles gave him his first professional contract. In July of the same year, without having appeared for Albion's first team, Lynex tried his luck in Ireland; after a trial with Sligo Rovers he followed Giles to Shamrock Rovers.

He made his Rovers debut on 24 September 1977 at home to Shelbourne, scoring in the 4-1 win. During his time at Milltown he made 6 appearances in the FAI Cup, scoring 2 goals; one of these goals was against Waterford in the semi-final win, with a shot from outside the penalty area. He played a major role in the 1978 FAI Cup victory when he was brought down for the penalty which was the only goal of the game. Lynex scored two goals in the UEFA Cup Winners Cup wins over APOEL. Overall, he made 41 league appearances for Rovers, scoring 14 goals. He left Rovers in December 1978, and after a trial at Queens Park Rangers he joined Birmingham City in April 1979.

After three years with Birmingham, Lynex moved to Leicester City, where he is remembered for his prolific scoring for a winger as well as for creating chances for Gary Lineker and Alan Smith; he reached double figures of goals scored in three of his five full seasons at the club. He also occasionally appeared as a stand-in goalkeeper, in the days when the Football League only allowed one substitute to be selected, and teams rarely chose a goalkeeper as a substitute.

After a loan spell at one former club Birmingham City, he went on to join another, West Bromwich Albion, and later played for Cardiff City, where he was nicknamed "Lethal Lynex" by the fans. He played his last Football League game in 1990 and then moved into non-league football with Telford United and Trafford Park before turning out in local football with Mitchells and Butlers and Ansells. After retiring as a footballer he went into the licensed trade.

== Honours ==
West Bromwich Albion

- FA Youth Cup winners: 1976

Shamrock Rovers

- FAI Cup winners: 1978

Birmingham City

- Second Division promotion: 1979–80

Leicester City

- Second Division promotion: 1982–83
