= Alan Young (Scottish footballer) =

Scottish footballer

Personal information
- Full name: Alexander Forbes Young
- Date of birth: 26 October 1955 (age 70)
- Place of birth: Kirkcaldy, Scotland
- Height: 5 ft 11 in (1.80 m)
- Position: Forward

Senior career*
Years	Team	Apps	(Gls)
1974–1979	Oldham Athletic	122	(30)
1979–1982	Leicester City	104	(26)
1982–1983	Sheffield United	26	(7)
1983–1984	Brighton & Hove Albion	26	(12)
1984–1986	Notts County	43	(12)
1986–1987	Rochdale	28	(2)
1987–1988	Shepshed Charterhouse	?	(?)
Total		349	(89)
- * Club domestic league appearances and goals

Alexander Forbes "Alan" Young (born 26 October 1955) is a Scottish footballer who played as a forward in the Football League.

He was born in Kirkcaldy. Having played for three clubs in the English East Midlands, Young still lives on the outskirts of Nottingham, in West Bridgford, and was a regular summariser during live football commentary on BBC Radio Leicester.
