= Stewart Kennedy =

Scottish footballer

Personal information
- Full name: Stewart Kennedy
- Date of birth: 31 August 1949 (age 77)
- Place of birth: Stirling, Scotland
- Position: Goalkeeper

Youth career
- Linlithgow Rose

Senior career*
Years	Team	Apps	(Gls)
1970–1973	Stenhousemuir	68	(0)
1973–1980	Rangers	99	(0)
1980–1991	Forfar Athletic	281	(0)
1991–1992	St Johnstone	1	(0)
Total		449	(0)

International career
1975	Scotland	5	(0)
- * Club domestic league appearances and goals

Stewart Kennedy (born 31 August 1949) is a Scottish former professional footballer who played as a goalkeeper for Stenhousemuir, Rangers, Forfar Athletic and St Johnstone. Kennedy also played in five full international matches for Scotland, all in 1975.

== Career ==
Kennedy joined Dunfermline Athletic as an 18-year-old in 1967 from local junior side Camelon, before returning to junior football in 1969 with Linlithgow Rose. Two years later he returned to the senior game, signing for Stenhousemuir. It was from here, after another two-year stint, he was signed by Rangers for £10,000. He mainly served as back-up for their established goalkeeper Peter McCloy. A number of goalkeepers came and left Rangers during McCloy's long career as number one, but Kennedy was the most successful, amassing 131 appearances and 45 clean sheets.

Standing 6 ft 1 in tall and weighing 11 st 5 lb, he made a major contribution to Rangers 1975 league win, their first in eleven years, playing in every match. From then until 1978 Kennedy and McCloy exchanged the position, both playing regularly. He was capped five times by Scotland in the 1974–75 season, his last appearance coming in a 5–1 defeat to England at Wembley.

Kennedy received two league championship winner's medals, in 1975 and 1978, and two for the League Cup, in 1976 and 1978. He left Ibrox in 1980, moving to Forfar on a free transfer. He continued playing there until the age of 40, and had a testimonial match against Rangers in 1985. He then came out of retirement to play one match for St Johnstone in the 1991–92 season, when the club suffered an injury crisis.
