= Alex O'Hara =

Scottish footballer (born 1956)

Personal information
- Full name: Alexander O'Hara
- Date of birth: 21 October 1956 (age 70)
- Place of birth: Glasgow, Scotland
- Position: Midfielder

Senior career*
Years	Team	Apps	(Gls)
1973–1977	Rangers	32	(7)
1977–1984	Partick Thistle	220	(46)
1984–1990	Morton	192	(11)
1990–1991	Hamilton Academical	24	(1)
Total		468	(65)
- * Club domestic league appearances and goals

Alexander O'Hara (born 21 October 1956) is a Scottish former professional football player, who is best known for his time with Partick Thistle and Greenock Morton.

O'Hara began his career with Rangers in 1973. Whilst at Ibrox he made over fifty appearances and was rumoured to be made an offer by Manchester United He signed for Partick Thistle where he made over 200 league appearances as captain, scoring close to fifty goals during his seven-year spell. He then moved on to Greenock Morton, where he spent six years, making over 200 appearances in total. O'Hara then had a brief spell with Hamilton Academical before he moved to the junior leagues with Glenafton Athletic.
