= Jim Melrose =

Scottish footballer

Personal information
- Full name: James Millsopp Melrose
- Date of birth: 7 October 1958 (age 68)
- Place of birth: Glasgow, Scotland
- Height: 5 ft 9 in (1.75 m)
- Position: Striker

Youth career
- Eastercraigs

Senior career*
Years	Team	Apps	(Gls)
1975–1980	Partick Thistle	122	(31)
1980–1982	Leicester City	72	(21)
1982–1983	Coventry City	24	(8)
1983–1984	Celtic	30	(7)
1984	→ Wolves (loan)	7	(2)
1984–1985	Manchester City	34	(8)
1985–1987	Charlton Athletic	48	(19)
1987	Leeds United	4	(0)
1987–1990	Shrewsbury Town	49	(3)
1990	Macclesfield Town	6	(0)
Total		405	(99)

International career
1977–1980	Scotland U21	8	(2)
- * Club domestic league appearances and goals

James Millsopp Melrose (born 7 October 1958) is a Scottish retired professional footballer who played as a striker. Melrose made nearly 400 appearances in the Scottish and English Football Leagues between 1975 and 1990, scoring nearly 100 goals.

== Playing career ==
Born in Glasgow, Melrose played for Eastercraigs, Partick Thistle, Leicester City, Coventry City, Celtic, Wolverhampton Wanderers, Manchester City, Charlton Athletic, Leeds United, Shrewsbury Town and Macclesfield Town. He made eight appearances for the Scotland under-21 team, scoring two goals.

Melrose joined Partick Thistle at the age of 12 as a schoolboy, and made his debut for the club at the age of 16.

He joined Leicester City in 1980 and was a regular at Filbert Street until an injury at Leyton Orient.

After two seasons he moved to Coventry City, later playing for Celtic, Wolves and Manchester City. At Manchester City, he helped the team to promotion during the 1984–85 season, but was released at the end of the season.

Melrose moved to Charlton Athletic, where he holds the record for scoring their fastest ever goal.

== Later career ==
After hanging up his boots, Melrose stayed within football and worked as a player agent, helping facilitate moves for Steve Lomas to West Ham United, Paul Lambert to Borussia Dortmund and Neil Lennon to Leicester City.

On 12 June 2009, it was announced that a consortium headed by Melrose was interested in buying Stockport County.

As of December 2014, Melrose was working as the Chief Scout for Bolton Wanderers.

== Honours ==
Charlton Athletic

- Full Members' Cup runner-up: 1986–87
