= Bobby McKean =

Scottish footballer

Personal information
- Full name: Robert Munro McKean
- Date of birth: 8 December 1952
- Place of birth: East Kilbride, Scotland
- Date of death: 15 March 1978 (aged 25)
- Place of death: Barrhead, Scotland
- Position: Midfielder

Senior career*
Years	Team	Apps	(Gls)
1969–1974	St Mirren	125	(38)
1974–1978	Rangers	91	(12)

International career
1976	Scotland	1	(0)
1976	Scottish League XI	1	(0)
- * Club domestic league appearances and goals

Robert Munro McKean (8 December 1952 – 15 March 1978) was a Scottish professional footballer, who played for St Mirren and Rangers. He appeared in one full international match for Scotland, in 1976.

== Career ==
McKean started his career at local club Blantyre Victoria before moving to St Mirren in 1969. After five seasons in Paisley he joined Rangers for £50,000 in September 1974. He enjoyed a successful spell in Govan and won the league twice in his first two seasons. He was also part of the 1976 Scottish Cup Final winning team.

== Death ==
McKean died on 15 March 1978 by carbon monoxide poisoning, only three days prior to the 1978 Scottish League Cup Final between Rangers and Celtic.
