= Eric Morris (footballer, born 1951) =

Scottish footballer

Personal information
- Full name: Eric Arthur Morris
- Date of birth: 30 September 1951 (age 75)
- Place of birth: Stranraer, Scotland
- Positions: Striker; defender

Youth career
- Muirkirk

Senior career*
| Years | Team | Apps | (Gls) |
| 1968 | Hamilton Academical (trialist) | 1 | (1) |
| 1972–1973 | Irvine Meadow | | |
| 1973–1979 | Rangers | 8 | (0) |
| 1979–1986 | Ayr United | 187 | (30) |
- Cumnock

International career
| 1980 | Scottish League XI | 1 | (0) |
- * Club domestic league appearances and goals

Eric Arthur Morris (born 30 September 1951) is a Scottish former professional footballer who mainly played for Ayr United.

Morris began his career with Muirkirk and had a trial with Hamilton Academical in 1968. In 1972–73, he had a season with Irvine Meadow, when the club reached the final of the Scottish Junior Cup versus Cambuslang Rangers and eventually won the trophy after two replays. Morris scored one goal in the final that ended 2–2, then two goals in the first replay that finished 3–3. Irvine Meadow won the second replay 1–0, with Morris' performances alerting the attention of Rangers, who signed him in the 1973 close season.

Morris debuted for the Govan club in a Scottish League Cup match versus Arbroath in August 1973, then rarely featured in the first-team over his six-year spell at Ibrox. Morris' only goal for Rangers was in a Scottish Cup match versus Queen's Park in January 1974. Morris then moved onto Ayr United in 1979. After over 200 appearances at Somerset Park, Morris returned to Junior football with Cumnock Juniors.
