= Everton Carr =

Antigua and Barbudan footballer

Personal information
- Full name: Everton Carr
- Date of birth: 11 January 1961 (age 65)
- Place of birth: Antigua and Barbuda
- Position: Defender

Senior career*
Years	Team	Apps	(Gls)
1978–1981	Leicester City	12	(0)
1981–1983	Halifax Town	53	(0)
1983	Rochdale	9	(0)
1983–1987	Nuneaton Borough	123	(0)
1987	Weymouth	11	(0)
1987	Bath City	6	(0)
1987–1988	Barnet	6	(0)
1988	→ Nuneaton Borough (loan)	3	(0)
1988	→ Aylesbury United (loan)	1	(0)
1988	Nuneaton Borough	7	(0)
1988–1989	Oadby Town		
Total		74	(0)
- * Club domestic league appearances and goals

Everton Carr (born 11 January 1961) is a former Antiguan footballer who played in the Football League for Leicester City, Halifax Town and Rochdale.
