= Ian Wilson (footballer, born 1958) =

Scottish footballer and manager

Personal information
- Full name: Ian William Wilson
- Date of birth: 27 March 1958 (age 68)
- Place of birth: Aberdeen, Scotland
- Height: 5 ft 7 in (1.70 m)
- Position: Midfielder

Youth career
- Aberdeen
- Dundee
- Elgin City

Senior career*
| Years | Team | Apps | (Gls) |
| 1979–1987 | Leicester City | 285 | (17) |
| 1987–1989 | Everton | 34 | (1) |
| 1989–1990 | Beşiktaş | 20 | (1) |
| 1990–1991 | Derby County | 11 | (0) |
| 1991–1992 | Bury | 24 | (1) |
| 1992–1993 | Wigan Athletic | 5 | (0) |
| 1993–1994 | Peterhead | | |
| Total | | 379 | (20) |

International career
| 1987–1988 | Scotland | 5 | (0) |

Managerial career
- 1993–1994: Peterhead
- 1995–1998: Peterhead
- 2000–2003: Peterhead
- * Club domestic league appearances and goals

Ian William Wilson (born 27 March 1958) is a Scottish former football player and manager.

== Playing career ==
Wilson's first professional club was hometown team Aberdeen where he spent one season and never played in a competitive first team game. Having received a free transfer, he signed for Dundee but again only lasted one season and never featured officially. After being freed by Dundee, Wilson moved to then Highland Football League club Elgin City. In 1977, he was involved in Elgin's Scottish Cup run which ended with a 3-0 defeat to Rangers at Ibrox. He also featured for a Highland Football League Select which were selected to play against Buckie Thistle F.C. to commemorate the opening of Buckie's floodlights in 1978.

Wilson was signed by Leicester City in April 1979 for a Highland League record-breaking transfer fee of £20,000. During a successful eight years at the club he served as team captain. Wilson left Filbert Street in September 1987 when new Everton boss Colin Harvey signed him for £300,000. His finest moment at Everton was playing in the 1989 FA Cup final in a 3-2 defeat to Liverpool, when he came on as a second-half substitute. Two seasons later, he signed for Istanbul giants Beşiktaş and, in his only season there, won both the Turkish League Championship and the Turkish Cup. He played two friendly games for Port Vale before signing with Bury in 1991.

Wilson was capped five times at senior level for Scotland, all during 1987.

== Managerial career ==
In 1993, immediately after leaving Wigan Athletic in the first half of the season, he became Player Manager of then Highland League club Peterhead F.C. where he guided them into a promotion-challenging position in each season of his three-and-a-half-year reign. He then moved to Japan to join Nagoya Grampus Eight as assistant manager to his former manager at Leicester, Gordon Milne. He returned in 1995 before again leaving to join up with Milne, this time at Beşiktaş J.K.

Wilson had a weekly column in the Aberdeen Evening Express entitled 'Wilson's World'. After this ended, he continued running his soccer schools in Aberdeen, which have been going since 1999. The schools develop and coach youngsters from age 4 to 14 years. Wilson also set up soccer schools in the Marmaris area of Turkey.

== Honours ==
Leicester City

- Football League Second Division: 1979–80

Everton

- FA Cup runner-up: 1988–89
- Full Members Cup runner-up: 1988–89

Beşiktaş

- Süper Lig: 1989–90
- Turkish Cup: 1989–90
- Turkish Super Cup: 1989
