= Kenny Watson (footballer) =

Scottish footballer

Personal information
- Full name: Kenneth Watson
- Date of birth: 5 January 1956 (age 70)
- Place of birth: Aberdeen, Scotland
- Position: Midfielder

Senior career*
Years	Team	Apps	(Gls)
1973–1975	Montrose	39	(4)
1975–1980	Rangers	62	(5)
1980–1989	Partick Thistle	254	(47)

International career
1977	Scotland U21	2	(0)
- * Club domestic league appearances and goals

Kenny Watson (born 5 January 1956) is a Scottish former professional footballer who is best known for his time with Partick Thistle.

Watson started his career a Montrose in 1973 and moved to Rangers three years later. He made his debut as a substitute against Partick Thistle in a League Cup match on 18 October 1976. His first goal also came against Thistle in a 2–1 league defeat on 30 October. After five seasons, 94 appearances and six goals, Watson left for Firhill.
