= Tommy Williams (footballer, born 1957) =

Scottish footballer

Personal information
- Full name: Thomas Edward Williams
- Date of birth: 18 December 1957 (age 68)
- Place of birth: Winchburgh, Scotland
- Height: 5 ft 9 in (1.75 m)
- Position: Defender

Youth career
- 1972–1974: Leicester Beavers
- 1974–1975: Leicester City

Senior career*
Years	Team	Apps	(Gls)
1975–1986	Leicester City	241	(10)
1986–1988	Birmingham City	62	(1)
1988–1991	Grimsby Town	20	(0)
- * Club domestic league appearances and goals

Thomas Edward Williams (born 18 December 1957) is a Scottish former professional footballer born in Winchburgh, West Lothian, who played as a defender. He made more than 300 appearances in the English Football League playing for Leicester City, Birmingham City and Grimsby Town. During a twelve-year career with Leicester City, he helped the club to win the championship of the Football League Second Division in the 1979–80 season. After finishing his playing career he spent 24 years as a police officer in Leicestershire.
