= Andy Peake =

English footballer

Personal information
- Full name: Andrew Michael Peake
- Date of birth: 1 November 1961 (age 64)
- Place of birth: Market Harborough, England
- Height: 5 ft 10 in (1.78 m)
- Position: Midfielder

Senior career*
Years	Team	Apps	(Gls)
1978–1985	Leicester City	147	(13)
1985–1986	Grimsby Town	39	(4)
1986–1991	Charlton Athletic	177	(5)
1991–1994	Middlesbrough	86	(1)
Total		449	(23)

International career
1979–1980	England Youth	7	(1)
1981	England U20	6	(0)
1982	England U21	1	(0)
- * Club domestic league appearances and goals

Andrew Michael Peake (born 1 November 1961) is an English former professional footballer who made nearly 450 appearances in the Football League and Premier League playing as a midfielder.

Peake is a former England youth and under-21 international player. After retiring from football, he spent 22 years as a police officer, leaving the force in 2016.

== Honours ==
Charlton Athletic

- Full Members' Cup runner-up: 1986–87
