= Larry May (footballer) =

English footballer (born 1958)

Personal information
- Full name: Lawrence Charles May
- Date of birth: 26 December 1958 (age 67)
- Place of birth: Sutton Coldfield, England
- Height: 6 ft 1 in (1.85 m)
- Position: Central defender

Youth career
- Warren
- Leicester City

Senior career*
Years	Team	Apps	(Gls)
1976–1983	Leicester City	187	(12)
1978	→ New England Tea Men (loan)	4	(0)
1983–1987	Barnsley	122	(3)
1987–1988	Sheffield Wednesday	31	(1)
1988–1989	Brighton & Hove Albion	24	(3)
Total		368	(19)
- * Club domestic league appearances and goals

Lawrence Charles May (born 26 December 1958) is an English former professional footballer who played as a central defender, making over 350 career appearances.

== Career ==
Born in Sutton Coldfield, May played for Warren, Leicester City, New England Tea Men, Barnsley, Sheffield Wednesday and Brighton & Hove Albion.

May was signed by Leicester City after playing youth football in Birmingham, and made his first-team debut at the age of 17. He suffered an injury and was sent to American team New England Tea Men for experience, but suffered a further injury whilst there. He turned professional the year before Gary Lineker, with Lineker being tasked with cleaning May's playing boots. May scored the only goal of the game as Leicester beat Leyton Orient to win the Second Division championship. He moved to Barnsley in August 1983 after losing his place in the first-team following a suspension. The transfer was for Barnsley's then-record fee of £150,000.

== Honours ==
Individual

- PFA Team of the Year: 1986–87 Second Division
