= Jock Wallace Jr. =

Scottish footballer (1935–1996)

Jock Wallace
Personal information
- Full name: John Martin Bokas Wallace
- Date of birth: 6 September 1935
- Place of birth: Wallyford, Scotland
- Date of death: 24 July 1996 (aged 60)
- Place of death: Basingstoke, England
- Position: Goalkeeper

Youth career
- Blackpool

Senior career*
Years	Team	Apps	(Gls)
1952–1953	Workington	6	(0)
1953–1954	Ashton United	3	(0)
1954–1958	Berwick Rangers	14	(0)
1958–1960	Airdrieonians	54	(0)
1960–1962	West Bromwich Albion	69	(0)
1962–1964	Bedford Town	79	(0)
1964–1966	Hereford United		
1966–1969	Berwick Rangers	75	(0)

International career
1959	SFL trial v SFA	1	(0)

Managerial career
- 1966–1969: Berwick Rangers
- 1972–1978: Rangers
- 1978–1982: Leicester City
- 1982–1983: Motherwell
- 1983–1986: Rangers
- 1986–1987: Sevilla
- 1989: Colchester United
- * Club domestic league appearances and goals

John Martin Bokas Wallace (6 September 1935 – 24 July 1996) was a Scottish professional football player and manager. Wallace played as a goalkeeper, and has the unique distinction of being the only player ever to play in the English, Welsh and Scottish Cups in the same season; this was set during the 1966–67 season where he played in the FA Cup and Welsh Cup for Hereford United, and in the Scottish Cup when he moved to Berwick Rangers.

As manager of Rangers over two spells in the 1970s and 1980s, Wallace became one of Scottish football's best-known and most successful coaches.

== Playing career ==
Wallyford-born Wallace's playing career began inauspiciously. A goalkeeper, he was released by his first club, Blackpool, but rekindled his career by signing for Workington in 1952, dovetailing football with work in the local pit. His next opportunity came in the unlikely form of National Service with the King's Own Scottish Borderers in Northern Ireland and – famously – the jungles of Malaya. Active duty proved to be character-defining for Wallace, and it also afforded him the opportunity of signing for the local club, Berwick Rangers. Afterward, he extended his playing career with moves to Airdrieonians, West Bromwich Albion, non-league Bedford Town and Hereford United.

== Managerial career ==
=== Berwick Rangers and Hearts ===
Wallace's managerial career began in 1966 as player-manager of Berwick Rangers. His rise to national prominence came in 1967, when he played for and managed the Berwick Rangers side which defeated Rangers in the Scottish Cup, providing one of the most famous cup upsets in Scotland. That achievement in turn propelled Wallace into a coaching job at Hearts in 1968. In addition Wallace set a unique record of being the only player to play in the Scottish Cup, FA Cup and Welsh Cup in the same season – having played in the latter two competitions for Hereford United in the early part of the 1966–67 season.

=== Success at Rangers ===
It was in 1970 that Wallace arrived at his spiritual home, Ibrox Stadium, as coach of Rangers under manager Willie Waddell. The partnership with Waddell was one that helped Rangers win the 1971–72 European Cup Winners' Cup. After the European triumph, Waddell left his post as manager to take a behind-the-scenes role and Wallace was appointed as manager. In his first season in charge – the club's centenary – he won the Scottish Cup. In 1974–75, it was Wallace who presided over the Rangers team that finally ended Celtic's nine-year period of dominance and won the League championship for the first time in eleven years. In the 1975–76 and 1977–78 seasons, Wallace was to capture the treble of all three Scottish trophies.

Wallace's management of Rangers in the mid-1970s saw the club regain the ascendancy it had enjoyed throughout much its history. But just as the prospect of further sustained success beckoned, Wallace unexpectedly resigned as manager in 1978. The precise cause was never fully established, as Wallace maintained silence until his death in 1996. Most of the speculation centred on alleged disputes with the Rangers board (and with Waddell in particular) about transfer budgets or Wallace's own salary.

=== Leicester City ===
Wallace's subsequent career spanned an eclectic mix of clubs. His first post was as manager of Leicester City in England. Wallace steered the club to Football League Second Division title glory in 1980, and took them to the 1982 FA Cup semi-finals. In January 1981, Wallace made an audacious attempt to sign three-time European Footballer of the Year, Johan Cruyff. Despite negotiations lasting three weeks, in which the player himself expressed his desire to play for City, a deal was never agreed.

=== Return to Scotland ===
Wallace returned to Scotland in 1982, taking charge of Motherwell. In November 1983 he returned to manage a Rangers side that, under John Greig, had consistently under-performed since Wallace's departure. The success of the New Firm of Aberdeen and Dundee United had seen Rangers turn to Alex Ferguson, the Aberdeen manager, who rejected the offer to take over at Ibrox. The club then approached Dundee United boss Jim McLean, who also declined, prompting Rangers to turn to Wallace again. In spite of capturing two League Cups, Wallace's second spell with Rangers was a frustrating one as the club failed to dent the dominance of the New Firm and offered only sporadic challenge to Celtic. Arguably his primary achievement in that spell was supporting a young, unsure Ally McCoist who went on to lead the forward line in the club's successes some years later. He was sacked by Rangers in April 1986, and then had short spells with Sevilla in Spain from 1986 to 1987, and in England with Colchester United from 1988 to 1990.

Wallace died from Parkinson's disease in 1996, aged 60, and is still widely remembered by Rangers fans as one of their club's greatest ever managers.

== Management style ==
Wallace was renowned for his ability to lose his temper and terrify players who he thought were not trying their best. Gary Lineker, who played under Wallace at Leicester City, is quoted as saying "[he] pinned me against the dressing room wall at half-time and called me a lazy English this and that. We were 2–0 up and I'd scored both goals. I didn't score in the second half – I was still shaking!"

Mark Warburton, who later went on to also manage Rangers, said of his time as a youth player at Leicester City, that he took a dislike to the training methods of Wallace, later saying "he was a Marine. We had runs on sand-dunes, running until we threw up. I learned a lot from that, never treating a player that way". However, most of Wallace's players adored him.

== Managerial statistics ==
Team	From	To	Record				
Team	From	To	P	W	D	L	Win %
Berwick Rangers	December 1966	February 1969	138	46	26	66	33.33
Rangers	31 May 1972	23 May 1978	308	201	56	51	65.26
Leicester City	24 May 1978	12 July 1982	189	69	51	69	36.51
Motherwell	August 1982	May 1983	44	14	8	22	31.82
Rangers	10 November 1983	7 April 1986	142	62	38	42	43.66
Sevilla	1986	1987	44	14	11	19	31.82
Colchester United	8 January 1989	20 December 1989	52	12	16	24	23.08
Total			917	418	206	293	45.58

- Source from soccerbase.

== Honours ==
Rangers

- Scottish Football League: 1974–75, 1975–76, 1977–78
- Scottish Cup: 1972–73, 1975–76, 1977–78
- Scottish League Cup: 1975–76, 1977–78, 1983–84, 1984–85

Leicester City

- Football League Second Division: 1979–80
