= 1972–73 Rangers F.C. season =

Rangers
1972-73 season
- Chairman: John Lawrence
- Manager: Jock Wallace
- Ground: Ibrox Park
- Scottish League Division One: 2nd P34 W26 D4 L4 F74 A30 Pts56
- Scottish Cup: Winners
- League Cup: Semi-finals
- European Super Cup: Runners-up
- Top goalscorer: League: Derek Parlane (19); All: Derek Parlane (27)

The 1972–73 season was the 93rd season of competitive football by Rangers.

== Overview ==
Rangers played a total of 53 competitive matches during the 1972–73 season. The season was the club's centenary year. After a stuttering start to the league campaign, three defeats and a draw from the first six matches, the sides fortunes greatly improved. From October to the end of the season Rangers suffered only one league defeat, at home to Hearts on 2 December 1972, and went on a run of sixteen wins. However this run was not enough to become league champions as the side finished second, one point behind Celtic.

In the cup competitions, the Scottish Cup campaign was to culminate in a 3–2 win over Celtic. The final was attended by Princess Alexandra along with 122,714 other spectators. It was Rangers first Scottish Cup win in seven years. The League Cup run was ended in the semi-finals at the hands of Hibernian after a 1–0 defeat.

This season also saw Rangers compete in the first ever European Super Cup. The side played the European Cup holders Ajax in January 1973. The Dutch side were the only continental opposition the side faced that season due to the club's European competition ban. In the end Ajax proved too strong and recorded a 6–3 aggregate win, with Rangers losing 1–3 at Ibrox and 3–2 in Amsterdam.

== Results ==
All results are written with Rangers' score first.

=== Scottish First Division ===
Date	Opponent	Venue	Result	Attendance	Scorers
2 September 1972	Ayr United	A	1–2	14,500	Johnston
9 September 1972	Partick Thistle	H	2–1	35,000	MacDonald, Johnston
16 September 1972	Celtic	A	1–3	50,416	Greig
23 September 1972	Falkirk	H	1–0	28,798	McLean (pen.)
30 September 1972	Kilmarnock	A	1–2	10,643	McLean
7 October 1972	Morton	H	1–1	30,000	Fyfe
14 October 1972	Motherwell	A	2–0	17,621	Young, Parlane (pen.)
21 October 1972	Arbroath	A	2–1	8,400	Parlane, Mason
28 October 1972	St. Johnstone	H	5–1	24,202	Conn (2), Parlane (2), Johnstone
4 November 1972	Dundee	A	1–1	19,600	Conn
11 November 1972	Airdrieonians	H	1–0	22,201	Conn
18 November 1972	Hibernian	A	2–1	33,356	Conn, Fyfe
25 November 1972	Dumbarton	H	3–1	24,500	Young, Conn, Jardine
2 December 1972	Heart of Midlothian	H	0–1	27,350	
9 December 1972	Dundee United	A	4–1	12,500	Parlane (2), Conn, Jardine
16 December 1972	Aberdeen	H	0–0	26,375	
23 December 1972	East Fife	A	4–0	8,608	Johnstone (2), Young, Parlane
30 December 1972	Ayr United	H	2–1	27,653	Conn, Parlane
1 January 1973	Partick Thistle	A	1–0	18,500	Young
6 January 1973	Celtic	H	2–1	72,479	Parlane, Conn
13 January 1973	Falkirk	A	4–2	17,000	Young (2), Parlane (pen.), Conn
20 January 1973	Kilmarnock	H	4–0	24,515	Parlane (2), Young, Greig
27 January 1973	Morton	A	2–1	16,000	MacDonald, Young
10 February 1973	Motherwell	H	2–1	27,000	Young, Jardine
19 February 1973	Arbroath	H	5–0	25,662	Parlane (2), Young, Greig, Miller
3 March 1973	St. Johnstone	A	2–1	12,000	Miller, Mason
10 March 1973	Dundee	H	3–1	32,500	Parlane (2), MacDonald
20 March 1973	Airdrieonians	A	6–2	20,000	Parlane, Greig, Johnstone, McLean, MacDonald, Young
24 March 1973	Hibernian	H	1–0	51,226	McLean
31 March 1973	Dumbarton	A	2–1	13,000	Young, Parlane
7 April 1973	Heart of Midlothian	A	1–0	24,064	Greig
14 April 1973	Dundee United	H	2–1	38,000	Greig (2)
21 April 1973	Aberdeen	A	2–2	33,000	McLean, Conn
28 April 1973	East Fife	H	2–0	27,544	Young, Conn

=== European Super Cup ===
Date	Opponent	Venue	Result	Attendance	Scorers
16 January 1973	Ajax	H	1–3	58,199	MacDonald
24 January 1973	Ajax	A	2–3	43,000	MacDonald, Young

=== Scottish Cup ===
Date	Round	Opponent	Venue	Result	Attendance	Scorers
3 February 1973	R3	Dundee United	H	1–0	35,657	Young
24 February 1973	R4	Hibernian	H	1–1	63,889	Johnstone
28 February 1973	R4 R	Hibernian	A	2–1	49,007	McLean (2, 1 pen.)
17 March 1973	QF	Airdrieonians	H	2–0	35,500	Parlane (pen.), Young
4 April 1973	SF	Ayr United	N	2–0	51,815	Parlane (2)
5 May 1973	F	Celtic	N	3–2	122,714	Parlane, Conn, Forsyth

=== League Cup ===
Date	Round	Opponent	Venue	Result	Attendance	Scorers
12 August 1972	SR	Clydebank	H	2–0	26,240	Conn, MacDonald
16 August 1972	SR	St. Mirren	A	4–0	15,000	Johnstone, Greid, Stein, Conn
19 August 1972	SR	Ayr United	H	2–1	25,000	Johnstone, Parlane
23 August 1972	SR	St. Mirren	H	1–4	20,000	Conn
26 August 1972	SR	Clydebank	A	5–0	9,000	
30 August 1972	SR	Ayr United	A	2–1	15,000	Johnston, Johnstone
20 September 1972	R2	Stenhousemuir	A	5–0	3,650	Johnstone (3), Parlane, Greig
4 October 1972	R2	Stenhousemuir	H	1–2	6,000	Fyfe
11 October 1972	QF	St. Johnstone	H	1–1	15,000	Parlane
1 November 1972	QF	St. Johnstone	A	2–0	12,300	Young, Parlane (pen.)
22 November 1972	SF	Hibernian	N	0–1	46,513	

== Appearances ==
Player	Position	Appearances	Goals
(Scotland) Peter McCloy	GK	52	0
(Scotland) Sandy Jardine	DF	53	2
(Scotland) Willie Mathieson	DF	53	0
(Scotland) John Greig	DF	48	10
(Scotland) Colin Jackson	DF	14	0
(Scotland) Derek Johnstone	DF	47	10
(Scotland) Tommy McLean	MF	38	8
(Scotland) Jim Denny	DF	9	0
(Scotland) Willie Johnston	FW	9	5
(Scotland) Colin Stein	FW	8	2
(Scotland) Graham Fyfe	MF	13	3
(Scotland) Alex MacDonald	MF	45	7
(Scotland) Dave Smith	MF	45	1
(Scotland) Alfie Conn	MF	30	14
(Scotland) Derek Parlane	FW	45	27
(Scotland) George Donaldson	MF	9	0
(Scotland) Quinton Young	MF	37	17
(Scotland) Tom Forsyth	MF	29	1
(Scotland) Joe Mason	FW	17	2
(Germany) Gerry Neef	GK	1	0
(Scotland) Alex Miller	DF	4	2
(Scotland) Andy Penman	MF	2	0
(Scotland) Iain McDonald	MF	1	0
(Scotland) Phil Bonnyman	MF	1	0

== See also ==
- 1972–73 in Scottish football
- 1972–73 Scottish Cup
- 1972–73 Scottish League Cup
- 1972 European Super Cup
