= 1971–72 Rangers F.C. season =

Rangers
1971–72 season
- Chairman: John Lawrence
- Manager: William Waddell
- Ground: Ibrox Park
- Scottish League Division One: 3rd P34 W21 D2 L11 F71 A38 Pts44
- Scottish Cup: Semi-finals
- League Cup: Sectional Round
- Cup Winners' Cup: Winners
- Top goalscorer: League: Colin Stein, Alex MacDonald, Willie Johnston (11); All: Colin Stein (25)

The 1971–72 season was the 92nd season of competitive football by Rangers.

== Overview ==
Rangers played a total of 56 competitive matches during the 1971–72 season. They won their first and only European trophy this season. The side won the European Cup Winners' Cup in Barcelona, Spain. The match was effectively over by half time thanks to goals from Colin Stein and a double from Willie Johnston. The Soviet team Dynamo Moscow scored twice in the second half, but the Rangers held on for a famous victory.

Domestically, Waddell's side finished a disappointing third in the Scottish League Division One. The club ended the season without the Scottish Cup or League Cup after being knocked out of the former by Hibernian at the semi-final stage. They never progressed from the sectional rounds in the League Cup.

== Results ==
All results are written with Rangers' score first.

=== Scottish First Division ===
Date	Opponent	Venue	Result	Attendance	Scorers
4 September 1971	Partick Thistle	A	2–3	30,000	MacDonald, Stein
11 September 1971	Celtic	H	2–3	80,211	Johnston (pen.), Stein
18 September 1971	Falkirk	A	3–0	24,000	Greig (2), Stein
25 September 1971	Aberdeen	H	0–2	41,236	
2 October 1971	Heart of Midlothian	A	1–2	29,301	Johnston
9 October 1971	East Fife	H	3–0	25,000	Jardine (pen.), Fyfe, MacDonald
16 October 1971	Dundee United	A	5–1	17,000	MacDonald (2), Stein, Greig, Jardine
23 October 1971	Motherwell	H	5–1	25,000	Fyfe (2), MacDonald, Jardine
30 October 1971	Kilmarnock	H	3–1	25,442	MacDonald (2), Stein
6 November 1971	St Johnstone	A	4–1	27,000	Johnston (3, 2 pens), MacDonald
13 November 1971	Dundee	H	2–3	33,200	Johnston (2)
20 November 1971	Greenock Morton	A	2–1	12,500	Johnston, Greig
27 November 1971	Ayr United	A	2–1	15,100	Stein, Henderson
4 December 1971	Clyde	H	1–0	25,000	Stein
11 December 1971	Dunfermline Athletic	A	2–0	13,500	Greig, Johnston
18 December 1971	Airdrieonians	H	3–0	25,000	Stein, Jardine (pen.), Fyfe
25 December 1971	Hibernian	A	1–0	30,000	Stein
1 January 1972	Partick Thistle	H	2–1	38,200	Greig, Johnstone
3 January 1972	Celtic	A	1–2	77,811	Stein
8 January 1972	Falkirk	H	3–1	23,000	Greig, Jackson, McDonald
15 January 1972	Aberdeen	A	0–0	33,608	
22 January 1972	Heart of Midlothian	H	6–0	29,776	Johnstone (3), Johnston, Greig, Conn
29 January 1972	East Fife	A	1–0	12,018	Johnstone
12 February 1972	Dundee United	H	1–0	25,000	Smith
19 February 1972	Motherwell	A	0–2	16,192	
4 March 1972	Kilmarnock	A	2–1	14,707	Jardine, Conn
11 March 1972	St Johnstone	H	2–0	25,000	Johnstone, McLean
25 March 1972	Greenock Morton	H	1–2	20,000	Jackson
8 April 1972	Clyde	A	1–1	7,500	Johnston
10 April 1972	Dundee	A	0–2	13,000	
22 April 1972	Airdrieonians	A	2–0	10,000	Penman (2), Fyfe
27 April 1972	Dunfermline Athletic	H	3–4	5,000	MacDonald (2), Stein
29 April 1972	Hibernian	H	1–2	11,000	Johnstone
1 May 1972	Ayr United	H	4–2	4,000	Conn, Penman, MacDonald, Fyfe

=== Cup Winners' Cup ===
Date	Round	Opponent	Venue	Result	Attendance	Scorers
15 September 1971	R1	Stade Rennais	A	1–1	13,993	Johnston
28 September 1971	R1	Stade Rennais	H	1–0	46,521	MacDonald
20 October 1971	R2	Sporting Lisbon	H	3–2	50,411	Stein (2), Henderson
3 November 1971	R2	Sporting Lisbon	A	3–4	60,233	Stein (2), Henderson
8 March 1972	QF	Torino	A	1–1	40,000	Johnston
22 March 1972	QF	Torino	H	1–0	75,303	MacDonald
5 April 1972	SF	Bayern Munich	A	1–1	44,000	Zobel (o.g.)
19 April 1972	SF	Bayern Munich	H	2–0	80,209	Jardine, Parlane
24 May 1972	F	Dynamo Moscow	N	3–2	45,101	Johnston (2), Stein

=== Scottish Cup ===
Date	Round	Opponent	Venue	Result	Attendance	Scorers
5 February 1972	R1	Falkirk	A	2–2	20,000	Johnstone, Greig
9 February 1972	R1 R	Falkirk	H	2–0	43,000	Stein, McLean
26 February 1972	R2	St Mirren	A	4–1	29,376	McLean (2, 1 pen.), MacDonald, Stein
18 March 1972	QF	Motherwell	A	2–2	28,557	MacDonald, Stein
27 March 1972	QF R	Motherwell	H	4–2	44,800	Stein (2), McLean, Fallon (o.g.)
15 April 1972	SF	Hibernian	N	1–1	75,884	MacDonald
24 April 1972	SF R	Hibernian	N	0–2	67,547	

=== League Cup ===
Date	Round	Opponent	Venue	Result	Attendance	Scorers
14 August 1971	SR	Celtic	A	0–2	72,505	
18 August 1971	SR	Ayr United	H	4–0	33,502	Johnstone (2), Stein, McLean (pen.)
21 August 1971	SR	Morton	H	2–0	41,120	Johnstone, MacDonald
25 August 1971	SR	Ayr United	A	4–0	20,000	Stein (2), MacDonald, Johnstone
28 August 1971	SR	Celtic	H	0–3	85,019	
1 September 1971	SR	Morton	A	1–0*	7,000	Stein

*Rangers failed to reach the Quarter-finals

== Appearances ==
Player	Position	Appearances	Goals
(Scotland) Peter McCloy	GK	56	0
(Scotland) Alex MacDonald	FW	54	18
(Scotland) Sandy Jardine	DF	53	6
(Scotland) Willie Mathieson	DF	50	0
(Scotland) Colin Stein	FW	49	25
(Scotland) John Greig	DF	48	9
(Scotland) Willie Johnston	FW	45	15
(Scotland) Dave Smith	MF	44	1
(Scotland) Colin Jackson	DF	43	2
(Scotland) Tommy McLean	MF	42	6
(Scotland) Derek Johnstone	FW	35	12
(Scotland) Alfie Conn	MF	34	3
(Scotland) Willie Henderson	MF	18	3
(Scotland) Ronnie McKinnon	DF	17	0
(Scotland) Graham Fyfe	MF	15	6
(Scotland) Andy Penman	MF	14	3
(Scotland) Jim Denny	DF	12	0
(Scotland) Iain McDonald	MF	7	1
(Scotland) Derek Parlane	FW	4	1
(Scotland) Alex Miller	DF	2	0

== See also ==
- 1971–72 in Scottish football
- 1971–72 Scottish Cup
- 1971–72 Scottish League Cup
- 1971–72 European Cup Winners' Cup
