= 1970–71 Rangers F.C. season =

Rangers
1970–71 season
- Chairman: John Lawrence
- Manager: William Waddell
- Ground: Ibrox Park
- Scottish League Division One: 4th P34 Pts41 W16 D9 L9 F58 A34
- Scottish Cup: Runner-up
- League Cup: Winners
- Inter-Cities Fairs Cup: First round
- Top goalscorer: League: Colin Stein (12 Goals); All: Colin Stein (20 Goals)

The 1970–71 season was the 91st season of competitive football by Rangers.

== Overview ==
Rangers played a total of 53 competitive matches during the 1970–71 season. The season was largely overshadowed by the Second Ibrox disaster when 66 people were crushed to death on Stairway 13 of Ibrox Park following an Old Firm game on 2 January 1971.

== Results ==
All results are written with Rangers' score first.

=== Scottish First Division ===
Date	Opponent	Venue	Result	Attendance	Scorers
29 August 1970	St Mirren	A	0–0	27,400	
5 September 1970	Falkirk	H	2–0	39,000	Willie Johnston (2, 1 pen.)
12 September 1970	Celtic	A	0–2	75,202	
19 September 1970	Cowdenbeath	H	5–0	31,000	Derek Johnstone (2), John Greig (2), Alex MacDonanld
26 September 1970	Dundee United	A	2–0	23,000	Alfie Conn, Graham Fyfe
3 October 1970	Motherwell	H	3–1	37,000	Alex MacDonald, Colin Stein, Willie Johnston
10 October 1970	Hearts	A	1–0	32,500	Willie Johnston (pen.)
17 October 1970	Aberdeen	H	0–2	39,763	
31 October 1970	Airdrieonians	H	5–0	28,788	Willie Johnston (2, 1 pen.), Colin Stein (2), Alfie Conn
7 November 1970	Dunfermline Athletic	A	1–1	20,000	Colin Jackson
14 November 1970	Clyde	H	5–0	25,915	Colin Stein (2), Willie Johnston (pen.), Derek Johnstone, Mulheron (o.g.)
21 November 1970	Ayr United	A	1–2	20,000	Young (o.g.)
25 November 1970	Hibernian	A	2–3	18,770	Derek Johnstone, Colin Stein
28 November 1970	Morton	A	2–1	15,000	Alfie Conn, Graham Fyfe
5 December 1970	Dundee	H	0–0	25,420	
12 December 1970	St Johnstone	A	1–2	10,500	Graham Fyfe
19 December 1970	Kilmarnock	H	4–2	19,450	Derek Johnstone (2), Colin Jackson, Alex MacDonald
26 December 1970	St Mirren	H	1–0	25,000	John Greig
1 January 1971	Falkirk	A	1–3	18,000	Alfie Conn
2 January 1971	Celtic	H	1–1	80,107	Colin Stein
16 January 1971	Dundee United	H	1–1	27,776	John Greig
30 January 1971	Motherwell	A	2–1	17,500	Willie Mathieson, Colin Stein
6 February 1971	Hearts	H	1–0	29,398	Willie Henderson
20 February 1971	Aberdeen	A	0–0	36,000	
27 February 1971	Hibernian	H	1–1	30,644	John Greig
10 March 1971	Airdrieonians	A	3–4	15,000	Alex MacDonald (2), Colin Stein
13 March 1971	Dunfermline Athletic	H	2–0	21,580	Willie Henderson, John Greig
20 March 1971	Clyde	A	2–2	10,500	Willie Johnston, Colin Stein
27 March 1971	Ayr United	H	2–0	22,000	John Greig, Willie Johnston
3 April 1971	Morton	H	0–0	13,986	
10 April 1971	Dundee	A	0–1	18,000	
14 April 1971	Cowdenbeath	A	3–1	3,396	Sandy Jardine, John Greig, Colin Stein
17 April 1971	St Johnstone	H	0–2	17,566	
24 April 1971	Kilmarnock	A	4–1	8,544	Alex Miller, Willie Henderson, Alex MacDonald, Colin Stein

=== Inter-Cities Fairs Cup ===
Date	Round	Opponent	Venue	Result	Attendance	Scorers
16 September 1970	R1	Bayern Munich	A	0–1	30,000	
30 September 1970	R1	Bayern Munich	H	1–1	82,743	Colin Stein

=== Scottish Cup ===
Date	Round	Opponent	Venue	Result	Attendance	Scorers
23 January 1971	R3	Falkirk	H	3–0	42,000	Willie Johnston (2), Alfie Conn
13 February 1971	R4	St Mirren	A	3–1	32,373	Colin Stein (2), Willie Johnston (pen.)
6 March 1971	QF	Aberdeen	H	1–0	60,584	Colin Jackson
31 March 1971	SF	Hibernian	N	0–0	69,429	
5 April 1971	SF R	Hibernian	N	2–1	54,435	Willie Henderson, Alfie Conn
8 May 1971	F	Celtic	N	1–1	120,092	Derek Johnstone
12 May 1971	F R	Celtic	N	1–2	103,332	Craig (o.g.)

=== League Cup ===
Date	Round	Opponent	Venue	Result	Attendance	Scorers
8 August 1970	SR	Dunfermline Athletic	H	4–1	45,056	Colin Stein (2), Sandy Jardine, Willie Johnston (pen.)
12 August 1970	SR	Motherwell	A	2–0	25,000	Graham Fyfe, Willie Henderson
15 August 1970	SR	Morton	H	0–0	45,000	
19 August 1970	SR	Motherwell	H	2–0	35,000	Andy Penman, Colin Stein
22 August 1970	SR	Dunfermline Athletic	A	6–0	17,000	Willie Johnston (3, 1 pen.), Colin Jackson, Graham Fyfe, Colin Stein
26 August 1970	SR	Morton	A	2–0*	18,000	Willie Johnston, Alfie Conn
9 September 1970	QFL1	Hibernian	A	3–1	37,355	Graham Fyfe (2), Alfie Conn
23 September 1970	QFL2	Hibernian	H	3–1	54,231	Alex MacDonald, John Greig, Graham Fyfe
14 October 1970	SF	Cowdenbeath	N	2–0	35,000	Willie Johnston (pen.), Colin Stein
24 October 1970	F	Celtic	N	1–0*	106,263	Derek Johnstone

== Appearances ==
Player	Position	Appearances	Goals
(Scotland) Peter McCloy	GK	49	0
(Scotland) Alex MacDonald	FW	40+(8 sub)	7
(Scotland) Sandy Jardine	DF	49	2
(Scotland) Willie Mathieson	DF	23	1
(Scotland) Colin Stein	FW	49	20
(Scotland) John Greig	DF	43	9
(Scotland) Willie Johnston	FW	44	18 (8 pen.)
(Scotland) Dave Smith	MF	13+(2 sub)	0
(Scotland) Colin Jackson	DF	51	4
(Scotland) Billy Semple	FW	3	0
(Scotland) Derek Johnstone	FW	14+(7 sub)	8
(Scotland) Alfie Conn	MF	39+(3 sub)	8
(Scotland) Willie Henderson	MF	42+(3 sub)	5
(Scotland) Ronnie McKinnon	DF	52	0
(Scotland) Graham Fyfe	MF	19+(3 sub)	8
(Scotland) Andy Penman	MF	6+(4 sub)	1
(Scotland) Jim Denny	DF	1	0
(Scotland) Iain McDonald	MF	4	0
(Scotland) Derek Parlane	FW	2+(2 sub)	0
(Scotland) Alex Miller	DF	32+(1 sub)	1
(Germany) Gerry Neef	GK	3	0

== See also ==
- 1970–71 in Scottish football
- 1970–71 Scottish Cup
- 1970–71 Scottish League Cup
- 1970–71 Inter-Cities Fairs Cup
