= 1973–74 Rangers F.C. season =

Rangers
1973-74 season
- Chairman: Matt Taylor
- Manager: Jock Wallace
- Ground: Ibrox Park
- Scottish League Division One: 3rd P34 W21 D6 L7 F67 A34 Pts48
- Scottish Cup: Fourth round
- League Cup: Semi-finals
- Cup Winners' Cup: Second round
- Top goalscorer: League: Derek Parlane (16); All: Derek Parlane (22)
| Home colours | Away colours |

The 1973–74 season was the 94th season of competitive football by Rangers.

== Overview ==
Rangers played a total of 51 competitive matches during the 1973–74 season. This was the club's centenary season, however, the start to the league championship was poor with no goals in the first four home games which left the side with just seven points from their first six league matches. This early blip meant they were always chasing the title and eventually finished third, five points behind champions Celtic.

The League Cup campaign saw an Old Firm semi-final. A 3–1 win for Celtic saw them through to the final. The Scottish Cup did not prove any better as the club exited the competition thanks to a 3–0 defeat to Dundee. The European Cup Winners' Cup run was ended in the second round at the hands of Borussia Mönchengladbach.

== Results ==
All results are written with Rangers' score first.

=== Scottish First Division ===
| Date | Opponent | Venue | Result | Attendance | Scorers |
|---|---|---|---|---|---|
| 1 September 1973 | Ayr United | H | 0–0 | 30,000 | |
| 8 September 1973 | Partick Thistle | A | 1–0 | 22,000 | Scott |
| 15 September 1973 | Celtic | H | 0–1 | 70,403 | |
| 29 September 1973 | Heart of Midlothian | H | 0–3 | 35,000 | |
| 6 October 1973 | Arbroath | A | 2–1 | 7,710 | O'Hara (2) |
| 13 October 1973 | East Fife | H | 0–1 | 25,000 | |
| 20 October 1973 | Dundee United | A | 3–1 | 11,000 | Conn (2), O'Hara |
| 27 October 1973 | Hibernian | H | 4–0 | 35,000 | Jardine (2, 2 (pen.)), Conn, Greig |
| 3 November 1973 | Dunfermline Athletic | A | 2–2 | 20,000 | Jackson, O'Hara |
| 10 November 1973 | Morton | H | 1–0 | 20,000 | Greig |
| 17 November 1973 | Falkirk | H | 2–1 | 15,000 | Greig (2) |
| 24 November 1973 | Clyde | A | 2–0 | 15,000 | Jackson, A.MacDonald |
| 15 December 1973 | St Johnstone | H | 5–1 | 8,200 | Conn, Young, A.McDonald, Parlane, D.Smith |
| 22 December 1973 | Dumbarton | A | 2–0 | 7,500 | Parlane, Young |
| 29 December 1973 | Ayr United | A | 1–0 | 17,000 | Parlane |
| 1 January 1974 | Partick Thistle | H | 1–1 | 20,000 | Parlane (pen.) |
| 5 January 1974 | Celtic | A | 0–1 | 55,000 | |
| 12 January 1974 | Aberdeen | H | 1–1 | 16,000 | McLean |
| 19 January 1974 | Heart of Midlothian | A | 4–2 | 25,000 | Parlane (4) |
| 2 February 1974 | Arbroath | H | 2–3 | 22,000 | McLean, Parlane (pen) |
| 9 February 1974 | East Fife | A | 3–0 | 8,499 | Hamilton, Scott, McLean |
| 24 February 1974 | Dundee United | H | 3–1 | 25,500 | Parlane (2, 1 (pen.)), Young |
| 2 March 1974 | Hibernian | A | 1–3 | 23,149 | McLean |
| 16 March 1974 | Morton | A | 3–2 | 9,000 | Jackson (2), Parlane (pen.) |
| 23 March 1974 | Falkirk | A | 0–0 | 10,000 | |
| 30 March 1974 | Clyde | H | 4–0 | 21,000 | Johnstone, Greig, A.MacDonald, Scott |
| 2 April 1974 | Dunfermline Athletic | H | 3–0 | 22,000 | Parlane (pen.), Scott, Fyfe |
| 6 April 1974 | Motherwell | A | 4–1 | 13,346 | Young (2), Scott, Fyfe |
| 13 April 1974 | Dundee | H | 1–2 | 25,000 | Jardine (pen.) |
| 17 April 1974 | Aberdeen | A | 1–1 | 18,000 | Greig |
| 20 April 1974 | St Johnstone | A | 3–1 | 7,500 | Fyfe (2), Young |
| 24 April 1974 | Motherwell | H | 2–1 | 21,000 | Scott, Parlane |
| 27 April 1974 | Dumbarton | H | 3–1 | 20,000 | Scott (2), Fyfe |
| 29 April 1974 | Dundee | A | 3–2 | 10,578 | Fyfe (2), Young |

=== Cup Winners' Cup ===
| Date | Round | Opponent | Venue | Result | Attendance | Scorers |
|---|---|---|---|---|---|---|
| 19 September 1973 | R1 | Ankaragucu | A | 2–0 | 45,000 | Conn, McLean |
| 3 October 1973 | R1 | Ankaragucu | H | 4–0 | 30,000 | Greig (2), O'Hara, Johnstone |
| 24 October 1973 | R2 | Borussia Monchengladbach | A | 0–3 | 35,000 | |
| 7 November 1973 | R2 | Borussia Monchengladbach | H | 3–2 | 40,000 | Conn, Jackson, MacDonald |

=== Scottish Cup ===
| Date | Round | Opponent | Venue | Result | Attendance | Scorers |
|---|---|---|---|---|---|---|
| 26 January 1974 | R3 | Queen's Park | H | 8–0 | 19,000 | Parlane (3), McLean (3), Scott, Morris |
| 17 February 1974 | R4 | Dundee | H | 0–3 | 64,672 | |

=== League Cup ===
| Date | Round | Opponent | Venue | Result | Attendance | Scorers |
|---|---|---|---|---|---|---|
| 11 August 1973 | SR | Falkirk | H | 3–1 | 35,000 | Scott (2), Conn |
| 15 August 1973 | SR | Arbroath | A | 2–1 | 6,677 | Conn, Parlane |
| 18 August 1973 | SR | Celtic | H | 1–2 | 63,173 | Scott |
| 22 August 1973 | SR | Arbroath | H | 3–0 | 14,000 | MacDonald, Conn, Smith |
| 25 August 1973 | SR | Celtic | A | 3–1 | 65,000 | MacDonald, Parlane, Conn |
| 29 August 1973 | SR | Falkirk | A | 5–1 | 12,000 | Conn (2), O'Hara, McLean, Forsyth |
| 12 September 1973 | R2 | Dumbarton | H | 6–0 | 25,000 | Parlane (3, 1 (pen.)), Young (2), Greig (pen.) |
| 10 October 1973 | R2 | Dumbarton | A | 2–1 | 6,000 | Scott, Fyfe |
| 31 October 1973 | QF | Hibernian | H | 2–0 | 35,000 | Greig, Schaedler (o.g.) |
| 21 November 1973 | QF | Hibernian | A | 0–0 | 19,245 | |
| 5 December 1973 | SF | Celtic | N | 1–3 | 54,864 | MacDonald |

== Appearances ==
| Player | Position | Appearances | Goals |
|---|---|---|---|
| (Scotland) Peter McCloy | GK | 44 | 0 |
| (Scotland) Sandy Jardine | DF | 51 | 3 |
| (Scotland) Willie Mathieson | DF | 43 | 0 |
| (Scotland) John Greig | DF | 47 | 10 |
| (Scotland) Derek Johnstone | DF | 44 | 2 |
| (Scotland) Alex MacDonald | MF | 44 | 7 |
| (Scotland) Tommy McLean | MF | 41 | 9 |
| (Scotland) Tom Forsyth | MF | 33 | 1 |
| (Scotland) Alex O'Hara | MF | 26 | 6 |
| (Scotland) Derek Parlane | FW | 41 | 22 |
| (Scotland) Dave Smith | MF | 17 | 2 |
| (Scotland) Alfie Conn | MF | 25 | 12 |
| (Scotland) Jim Denny | DF | 1 | 0 |
| (Scotland) Ally Scott | FW | 34 | 13 |
| (Scotland) Quinton Young | MF | 26 | 9 |
| (Scotland) Doug Houston | MF | 17 | 0 |
| (Scotland) Stewart Kennedy | GK | 3 | 0 |
| (Scotland) Graham Fyfe | MF | 14 | 8 |
| (Scotland) Colin Jackson | DF | 24 | 5 |
| (Scotland) Johnny Hamilton | MF | 10 | 1 |
| (Scotland) Eric Morris | FW | 8 | 1 |
| (Scotland) Donald Hunter | GK | 4 | 0 |
| (Scotland) Ian McDougall | DF | 9 | 0 |
| (Scotland) Joe Mason | FW | 2 | 0 |
| (Scotland) George Donaldson | MF | 1 | 0 |

== See also ==
- 1973–74 in Scottish football
- 1973–74 Scottish Cup
- 1973–74 Scottish League Cup
- 1973–74 European Cup Winners' Cup
