= 1974–75 Rangers F.C. season =

Rangers
1974-75 season
- Chairman: Matt Taylor
- Manager: Jock Wallace Jr.
- Ground: Ibrox Park
- Scottish League Division One: 1st P34 W25 D6 L3 F86 A33 Pts56
- Scottish Cup: Third round
- League Cup: Sectional round
- Texaco Cup: Quarter-finals
- Top goalscorer: League: Derek Parlane (18); All: Derek Parlane (18)
Home colours	Away colours

The 1974–75 season was the 95th season of competitive football by Rangers.

== Overview ==
Rangers played a total of 42 competitive matches during the 1974–75 season. Rangers won the final Scottish Football League Division One title before it was rebranded as the Scottish Premier Division. They also stopped Celtic's quest for ten-in-a-row. The decisive championship match came on 29 March 1975, Rangers needed a point away to Hibernian and drew 1–1 with a goal from Colin Stein. The Edinburgh club finished second to Rangers with Celtic back in third, a full eleven points behind.

The cup competitions however, provided little success as Rangers crashed out of the Scottish Cup in the third round to Aberdeen and could not progress past the sectional round in the League Cup.

There was no competitive European football that season. However, Rangers returned to Camp Nou, Barcelona to play for the Joan Gamper Trophy. They defeated Athletic Bilbao but lost 4–1 to the hosts in the final.

== Results ==
All results are written with Rangers' score first.

=== Scottish First Division ===
Date	Opponent	Venue	Result	Attendance	Scorers
31 August 1974	Ayr United	A	1–1	20,102	Jardine (pen.)
7 September 1974	Partick Thistle	H	3–2	25,356	Fyfe (2), Young
14 September 1974	Celtic	A	2–1	65,447	McDougall, Jackson
21 September 1974	Dumbarton	H	3–2	22,211	Johnstone (2), Scott
28 September 1974	Kilmarnock	A	6–0	19,609	Young (2), Jardine (pen.), McKean, Johnstone, McLean
2 October 1974	Morton	H	2–0	25,008	Forsyth, McLean
12 October 1974	Dunfermline Athletic	A	6–1	18,000	Parlane (5), Johnstone
19 October 1974	Clyde	H	3–1	25,954	Jardine (pen), Fyfe, Johnstone
26 October 1974	Heart of Midlothian	A	1–1	29,000	Jardine (pen.)
2 November 1974	St Johnstone	A	2–1	13,260	McLean, Young
9 November 1974	Dundee	H	1–0	25,890	McKean
16 November 1974	Motherwell	A	5–0	19,409	Johnstone, Young, MacDonald, Parlane, McKean
23 November 1974	Hibernian	H	0–1	31,530	
30 November 1974	Dundee United	H	4–2	26,202	Jardine (2, 1 (pen.)), Parlane, McLean
7 December 1974	Aberdeen	A	2–1	26,000	Johnstone, McLean
14 December 1974	Arbroath	H	3–0	24,211	Parlane (2), Jackson
21 December 1974	Airdrieonians	A	3–4	19,500	Jardine (2, 1 (pen.)), Johnstone
28 December 1974	Ayr United	H	3–0	26,009	McLean, Jardine (pen.), Parlane
1 January 1975	Partick Thistle	A	4–0	22,000	Jackson, McLean, McDougall, Greig
4 January 1975	Celtic	H	3–0	71,389	Johnstone, McLean, Parlane
11 January 1975	Dumbarton	A	5–1	15,800	McLean (3), Parlane, Johnstone
1 February 1975	Morton	A	1–1	17,000	Fyfe
8 February 1975	Dunfermline Athletic	H	2–0	23,580	McLean, MacDonald
15 February 1975	Kilmarnock	H	3–3	27,157	Parlane (3)
22 February 1975	Clyde	A	2–1	20,000	McKean, O'Hara
1 March 1975	Heart of Midlothian	H	2–1	40,540	McKean, McLean
8 March 1975	St Johnstone	H	1–0	42,500	Young
15 March 1975	Dundee	A	2–1	22,700	McLean, Parlane
22 March 1975	Motherwell	H	3–0	36,590	Johnstone (2), Miller
29 March 1975	Hibernian	A	1–1	38,585	Stein
5 April 1975	Dundee United	A	2–2	21,000	McLean, Johnstone
12 April 1975	Aberdeen	H	3–2	41,198	Johnstone, Stein, Miller (pen.)
19 April 1975	Arbroath	A	2–1	6,393	Stein, Parlane
26 April 1975	Airdrieonians	H	0–1	65,121	

=== Scottish Cup ===
Date	Round	Opponent	Venue	Result	Attendance	Scorers
25 January 1975	R3	Aberdeen	A	1–1	30,000	Scott, Miller
10 February 1975	R3 R	Aberdeen	H	1–2	53,106	McKean

=== League Cup ===
Date	Round	Opponent	Venue	Result	Attendance	Scorers
7 August 1974	SR	St Johnstone	H	3–2	25,000	Scott, Jardine, Conn
10 August 1974	SR	Hibernian	A	1–3	23,539	Scott
14 August 1974	SR	St Johnstone	A	6–3	5,800	Young (2), Jardine (2), Scott, Forsyth
17 August 1974	SR	Dundee	A	2–0	18,548	Jardine, Fyfe
24 August 1974	SR	Dundee	H	4–0	35,268	Johnstone (2), Jardine (pen.), Scott
28 August 1974	SR	Hibernian	H	0–1	60,054	

=== Texaco Cup ===
Date	Round	Opponent	Venue	Result	Attendance	Scorers
18 September 1974	QF L1	Southampton	H	1–3		
1 October 1974	QF L2	Southampton	A	0–2		

== Appearances ==
Player	Position	Appearances	Goals
(Scotland) Stewart Kennedy	GK	42	0
(Scotland) Sandy Jardine	DF	42	14
(Scotland) Alex Miller	DF	25	2
(Scotland) Derek Johnstone	DF	35	16
(Scotland) Colin Jackson	DF	40	3
(Scotland) Tom Forsyth	MF	37	1
(Scotland) Tommy McLean	MF	41	14
(Scotland) Quinton Young	MF	34	8
(Scotland) Derek Parlane	FW	35	18
(Scotland) Graham Fyfe	MF	17	5
(Scotland) Ally Scott	FW	17	6
(Scotland) Ian McDougall	DF	15	2
(Scotland) Alex MacDonald	MF	33	2
(Scotland) John Greig	DF	23	1
(Scotland) Bobby McKean	MF	28	6
(Scotland) Jim Denny	DF	12	0
(Scotland) Alex O'Hara	MF	7	1
(Scotland) Johnny Hamilton	MF	3	0
(Scotland) Colin Stein	FW	8	3
(Scotland) Peter McCloy	GK	0	0
(Scotland) Willie Mathieson	DF	2	0
(Scotland) Richard Sharp	FW	1	0

== See also ==
- 1974–75 in Scottish football
- 1974–75 Scottish Cup
- 1974–75 Scottish League Cup
