= 1972 European Super Cup =

Rangers	Ajax
(Scotland)	(Netherlands)
3	6
- on aggregate

First leg
Rangers	Ajax
1	3
- Date: 16 January 1973
- Venue: Ibrox Park, Glasgow
- Referee: Alistair McKenzie (Scotland)
- Attendance: 57,209

Second leg
Ajax	Rangers
3	2
- Date: 24 January 1973
- Venue: Olympisch Stadion, Amsterdam
- Referee: Hans-Joachim Weyland (West Germany)
- Attendance: 26,168

The 1972 European Super Cup (it was known as Super Competition at the time) was a football match played over two legs between the winner of the 1971–72 European Cup and the winner of the 1971–72 European Cup Winners' Cup. The match was proposed by Anton Witkamp of De Telegraaf to decide who was the best club in Europe.

== History ==
In 1972, Witkamp proposed the idea to Jaap van Praag, the then president of Ajax, who were holders of the European Cup at that time. The idea was then taken to UEFA to seek official endorsement; however Sándor Barcs, the president of UEFA at that time, rejected the idea as the reigning European Cup Winners' Cup champions—Rangers—were serving a one-year ban at the time imposed by UEFA for the alleged misbehaviour of their fans.

The match went ahead, but unofficially as a celebration of Rangers' centenary. The first leg was played on 16 January 1973 and the second on 24 January 1973. Ajax won the tie 6–3 on aggregate, beating Rangers both at home and away, 3–1 in Glasgow and 3–2 in the second leg in Amsterdam.

== Match details ==
=== First leg ===
16 January 1973

Rangers (Scotland)	1–3	(Netherlands) Ajax
MacDonald 41'	Report	Rep 34'; Cruijff 45'; Haan 76'

Ibrox Stadium, Glasgow
Attendance: 57,000
Referee: Alistair McKenzie (Scotland)

Rangers	Ajax

GK	1	(Scotland) Peter McCloy
RB	2	(Scotland) Sandy Jardine
LB	3	(Scotland) Willie Mathieson
CB	4	(Scotland) John Greig (c)
CB	5	(Scotland) Derek Johnstone	(substituted off) 66'
CB	6	(Scotland) Dave Smith
RM	7	(Scotland) Alfie Conn	(substituted off) 46'
CM	8	(Scotland) Tom Forsyth
CF	9	(Scotland) Derek Parlane
CM	10	(Scotland) Alex MacDonald
LM	11	(Scotland) Quinton Young
Substitutes:
MF	12	(Scotland) Tommy McLean	(substituted on) 46'
MF	14	(Scotland) Graham Fyfe	(substituted on) 66'
Manager:
(Scotland) Jock Wallace

GK	1	(Netherlands) Heinz Stuy
RB	3	(Netherlands) Wim Suurbier
CM	12	(West Germany) Horst Blankenburg
CB	4	(Netherlands) Barry Hulshoff
LB	5	(Netherlands) Ruud Krol
DM	15	(Netherlands) Arie Haan
CM	9	(Netherlands) Gerrie Mühren
CM	10	(Netherlands) Arnold Mühren
RF	16	(Netherlands) Johnny Rep
CF	14	(Netherlands) Johan Cruijff	(substituted off) 80'
LF	11	(Netherlands) Piet Keizer (c)	(substituted off) 65'
Substitutes:
FW	8	(Netherlands) Sjaak Swart	(substituted on) 80'
MF	2	(Austria) Heinz Schilcher	(substituted on) 65'
Manager:
(Romania) Ştefan Kovács

=== Second leg ===
24 January 1973

Ajax (Netherlands)	3–2	(Scotland) Rangers
Haan 12'; Mühren 37' (pen.); Cruijff 79'	Report	MacDonald 2'; Young 35'

Olympisch Stadion, Amsterdam
Attendance: 26,168
Referee: Hans-Joachim Weyland (West Germany)

Ajax	Rangers

GK	1	(Netherlands) Heinz Stuy
RB	3	(Netherlands) Wim Suurbier
CM	12	(West Germany) Horst Blankenburg
CB	4	(Netherlands) Barry Hulshoff
LB	5	(Netherlands) Ruud Krol
DM	15	(Netherlands) Arie Haan
CM	9	(Netherlands) Gerrie Mühren
CM	7	(Netherlands) Johan Neeskens
RF	8	(Netherlands) Sjaak Swart	(substituted off) 46'
CF	14	(Netherlands) Johan Cruijff
LF	11	(Netherlands) Piet Keizer (c)
Substitute:
FW	16	(Netherlands) Johnny Rep	(substituted on) 46'
Manager:
(Romania) Ştefan Kovács

GK	1	(Scotland) Peter McCloy
RB	2	(Scotland) Sandy Jardine
LB	3	(Scotland) Willie Mathieson
CB	4	(Scotland) John Greig (c)
CB	5	(Scotland) Derek Johnstone
CB	6	(Scotland) Dave Smith
RM	7	(Scotland) Tommy McLean
CM	8	(Scotland) Tom Forsyth
CF	9	(Scotland) Derek Parlane
CM	10	(Scotland) Alex MacDonald
LM	11	(Scotland) Quinton Young
Manager:
(Scotland) Jock Wallace

== See also ==
- 1972 European Cup final
- 1972 European Cup Winners' Cup final
- 1972–73 European Cup
- 1972–73 European Cup Winners' Cup
- 1972–73 Rangers F.C. season
- AFC Ajax in international football
- Rangers F.C. in European football
