= 1972 European Cup Winners' Cup final =

- Event: 1971–72 European Cup Winners' Cup
Rangers	Dynamo Moscow
(Scotland)	(Soviet Union)
3	2
- Date: 24 May 1972
- Venue: Camp Nou, Barcelona
- Referee: José María Ortiz de Mendíbil (Spain)
- Attendance: 35,000

The 1972 European Cup Winners' Cup Final was a football match between Scottish team Rangers and Soviet team Dynamo Moscow. It took place at the Camp Nou in Barcelona on 24 May 1972 in front of a crowd of 35,000. It was the final of the 1971–72 European Cup Winners' Cup, one of three football competitions run by UEFA at the time. It was the 12th European Cup Winners' Cup final in history.

Both teams had to go through four qualifying rounds to get reach the final. Rangers won three of their four qualifying ties in regulation time, with their second round tie against Sporting CP going into extra time. Dynamo was required to win a penalty shootout to beat Dynamo Berlin in their semi-final. The final was the Rangers' third in European competition, having lost the previous two in 1961 and 1967. This was the first time a Soviet team had reached a European final.

Rangers scored two goals before half time and added a third minutes into the second half. Dynamo pulled a goal back midway through the second half and scored a late second towards the end of the game. The match finished 3–2 to Rangers.

The end of the match was overshadowed by a pitch invasion just before full time. The fans were cleared so the final minute of the match could be played. Fans made their way back onto the pitch once the final whistle had been blown, causing Rangers captain John Greig having to be awarded the trophy inside the stadium buildings. Despite the off-field violence the victory is considered to be the greatest in the club's history and the team was given the nickname the Barcelona Bears.

== Route to the final ==
(Scotland) Rangers					(Soviet Union) Dynamo Moscow			
Opponent	Agg.	1st leg	2nd leg		Opponent	Agg.	1st leg	2nd leg
(France) Rennes	2–1	1–1 (A)	1–0 (H)	First round	(Greece) Olympiacos	3–2	2–0 (A)	1–2 (H)
(Portugal) Sporting CP	6–6 (a)	3–2 (H)	3–4 (a.e.t.) (A)	Second round	(Turkey) Eskişehirspor	2–0	1–0 (A)	1–0 (H)
(Italy) Torino	2–1	1–1 (A)	1–0 (H)	Quarter-finals	(Socialist Federal Republic of Yugoslavia) Red Star Belgrade	3–2	2–1 (A)	1–1 (H)
(West Germany) Bayern Munich	3–1	1–1 (A)	2–0 (H)	Semi-finals	(East Germany) Dynamo Berlin	2–2 (4–1 p)	1–1 (A)	1–1 (a.e.t.) (H)

=== Rangers ===
Rangers began their route to the final by beating Stade Rennes 2–1 on aggregate. The first leg was drawn 1–1 with Willie Johnston scoring for Rangers. Rangers won the return leg 1–0 through Alex MacDonald. The second round saw Rangers play Sporting CP from Portugal. Rangers led the first half of the first leg 3–0, but lost two goals in the second half to lead 3–2 going into the second leg. The second leg finished 3–2 to Sporting, 5–5 on aggregate. Willie Henderson scored for Rangers in extra time but Rangers then lost a goal with six minutes left to make it 6–6 on aggregate. What followed has been described as being one of the most bizarre incidents in the history of any European tournament. The Dutch referee Laurens van Raavens failed to recognise that Rangers, having scored three away goals to Sporting's two, had won the tie. But the referee made both teams take five penalties each, with Rangers losing the shootout. After Rangers manager Willie Waddell pointed out the away goals rule to UEFA, the referee was overruled, the result overturned and Rangers were heading into the next round. Rangers then played Torino, Italian league leaders at the time, and won 2–1 on aggregate. In the semi-final Rangers played Bayern Munich, who had beaten Rangers in the final five years previously in Nuremberg. Rangers progressed 3–1 on aggregate to reach their third European final.

=== Dynamo Moscow ===
Dynamo Moscow began their campaign by defeating Olympiakos 3–2 on aggregate, before beating the Turkish side Eskişehirspor 3–0. Moscow's quarter final was against Red Star from Yugoslavia, who had reached the semi-final of the European cup the previous year. Moscow made it through 3–1 on aggregate again. In the semi-final Moscow played Dynamo Berlin from Germany. Scores were drawn 1–1 after both the first and second leg. Dynamo Moscow went through after a penalty shootout to become the first Russian club to reach a European final. The Russian players could have been awarded the coveted title Master of Sport, had they won in Barcelona.

== Match ==
=== Background ===
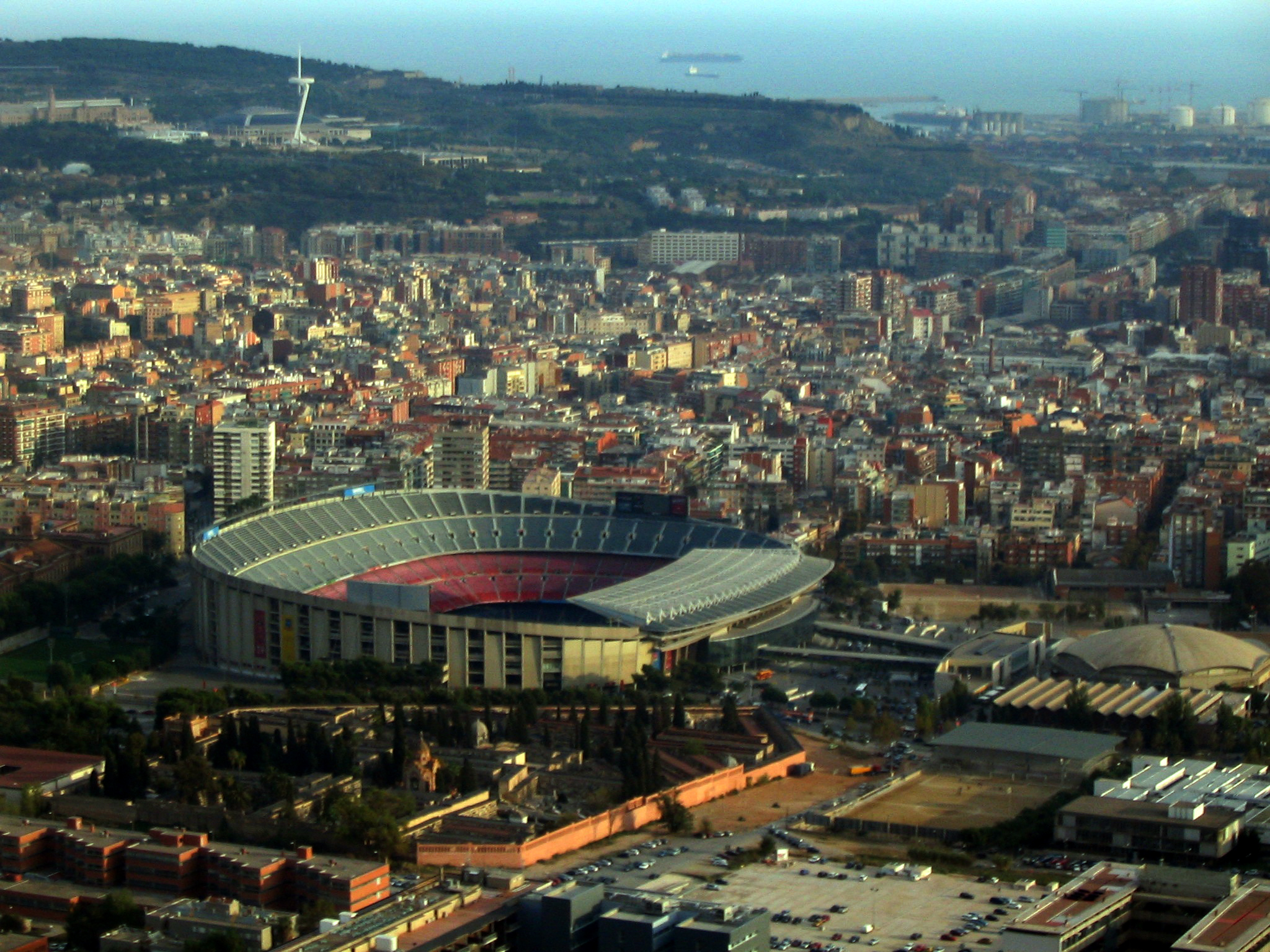
The final was held in the Camp Nou Barcelona

Dynamo Moscow were the first Soviet team to reach the final of a European football competition and as a result were not used to playing in such a high-profile match. Before the team left Moscow they were presented ideological speeches from Communist Party bosses aimed at motivating the players. Before the event, many concerns were expressed for possible troubles between Spanish police and Russian supporters. Due to the political background of the time in Spain, with the last years of Francisco Franco's right-wing dictatorship. Dynamo Moscow had an array of talented forward players including Gennady Evryuzhihin, Vladimir Kozlov, Anatoly Kozhemyakin, Michail Gershkovich, Anatoly Baydachny and Vladimir Eshtrekov. The manager Konstantin Beskov normally played three or four forwards in all of their matches.

Rangers had played in two previous European finals and were the first Scottish club to do so in 1961. Having been narrowly beaten in 1967 by Bayern Munich, Rangers were wanting to make amends. The previous year 66 Rangers supporters had died in the Ibrox disaster, a memory that was very recent in the minds of the support and the team. Rangers captain John Greig had grown a beard which he explained after Rangers victory against Sporting that it was a good luck omen and he would only shave it off when they were put out of the competition.

=== Summary ===
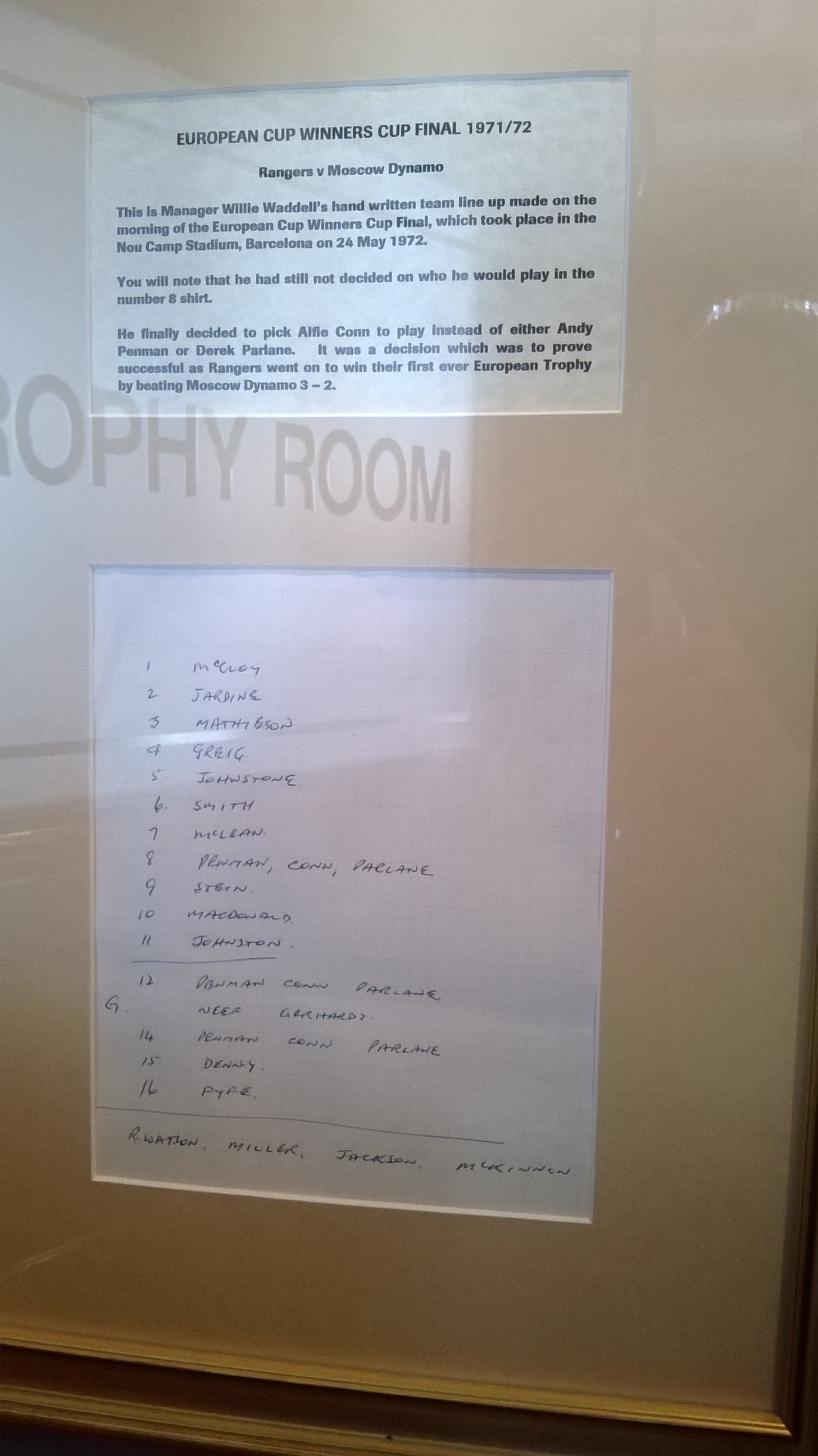
Rangers European Cup Winners' Cup final 1972 teamsheet

Dynamo were missing Kozlov and Kozhemyakin through injury and tried to play a more defensive type of game to contain Rangers. Rangers employed an attacking line up and had a two-goal lead by half time. The first was scored by forward Colin Stein with the assist provided by Dave Smith. The second was scored by Willie Johnston after he headed in a Dave Smith pass with six minutes to go before half time. Rangers went 3–0 up minutes into the second half as Willie Johnston scored his second after a long kick out by goalkeeper Peter McCloy. Dynamo Moscow came back into the match when with thirty minutes left for play Eshtrekov scored after a defensive mistake from the Rangers back line. Dynamo continued to pressure however the Rangers keeper Peter McCloy twice made fine saves from Gershkovich and Sandy Jardine cleared off the line from Evryuzhihin. Moscow found their second with three minutes left with a goal from Makhovikov. Rangers held on to secure their only trophy in Europe in front of almost 25,000 people, albeit there was no award ceremony in the stadium due to the Rangers fans pitch invasion.

The end of the contest was overshadowed by a pitch invasion by hundreds of Rangers supporters one minute before the final whistle, which held the game up for several minutes. In the sixties and seventies it was common to see pitch invasions at matches, including European finals - this generally happened after the end of the game, which was not the case in this match. At the time Spain was still under political oppression by fascist dictator Francisco Franco and revolts were violently repressed by armed Policía Armada (Armed Police). In 2015 interview Yozhef Sabo said that the pitch invasion occurred about seven minutes after Eshtrekov scored a goal which caused the game to be paused and then again soon after the Makhovikov's goal after which the referee simply ended the game.

While it was argued that the pitch invaders may simply have been celebrating victory prematurely due to the misinterpretation of the final whistle (the referee had blown for a throw-in) the Dynamo Moscow team believed that the pitch invasion was a calculated action by the fans designed to stop the Soviet side's momentum. In the final minutes, Dynamo were pressing hard to equalise but the sudden pitch invasion gave the Rangers defenders respite. Colin Stein later reflected on the game and stated that he believed the pitch invasion made it harder for the Rangers side during the final minutes of the game. Dynamo players claimed that they were attacked during this invasion, while bottles were thrown at police, whose actions have been described as heavy-handed.

After the game's final whistle there was a larger pitch invasion by Rangers supporters and as a result of this the trophy was presented to Rangers captain John Greig inside the stadium buildings.

== Match details ==
24 May 1972
20:30

Rangers (Scotland)	3–2	(Soviet Union) Dynamo Moscow
Stein 23'; Johnston 40', 49'	Report	Eshtrekov 60'; Makhovikov 87'

Camp Nou, Barcelona
Attendance: 35,000
Referee: José María Ortiz de Mendíbil (Spain)

Rangers	Dynamo Moscow

GK	1	(Scotland) Peter McCloy
DF	2	(Scotland) Sandy Jardine
DF	3	(Scotland) Willie Mathieson
DF	4	(Scotland) John Greig (c)
DF	5	(Scotland) Derek Johnstone
MF	6	(Scotland) Dave Smith
MF	7	(Scotland) Tommy McLean
MF	8	(Scotland) Alfie Conn
FW	9	(Scotland) Colin Stein
MF	10	(Scotland) Alex MacDonald
FW	11	(Scotland) Willie Johnston
Substitutes:
GK	13	(West Germany) Gerry Neef
MF	12	(Scotland) Andy Penman
FW	14	(Scotland) Derek Parlane
DF	15	(Scotland) Jim Denny
MF	16	(Scotland) Graham Fyfe
Manager:
(Scotland) Willie Waddell

GK	1	(Soviet Union) Vladimir Pilguy
DF	2	(Soviet Union) Vladimir Basalayev
DF	3	(Soviet Union) Oleg Dolmatov
DF	4	(Soviet Union) Valeri Zykov (c)
DF	5	(Soviet Union) Vladimir Dolbonosov	(substituted off) 69'
MF	6	(Soviet Union) Yevgeni Zhukov
FW	7	(Soviet Union) Anatoly Baidachny
FW	8	(Soviet Union) Andrei Yakubik	(substituted off) 56'
MF	9	(Soviet Union) Yozhef Sabo
MF	10	(Soviet Union) Aleksandr Makhovikov
FW	11	(Soviet Union) Gennady Yevryuzhikhin
Substitutes:
GK	N/A	(Soviet Union) Nikolai Gontar
DF	12	(Soviet Union) Sergei Nikulin
MF	13	(Soviet Union) Vladimir Eshtrekov	(substituted on) 56'
FW	14	(Soviet Union) Mikhail Gershkovich	(substituted on) 69'
FW	15	(Soviet Union) Anatoliy Kozhemyakin
FW	16	(Soviet Union) Vladimir Kozlov
Manager:
(Soviet Union) Konstantin Beskov

== Aftermath ==
=== Rangers reaction to victory ===
Rangers victory meant that they qualified for the 1972 European Super Cup where they played the 1972 European Cup winners AFC Ajax, however they lost the final 6–3 over two legs.

Rangers victory in the final has been heralded as one of the greatest achievements in the club's history. Sandy Jardine who played in the final placed the victory at the very top of the club's achievements. The team that won the final became known as the Barcelona Bears. In 2006 Rangers opened Bar 72 in the Govan stand which was named in honour of the team that won the Cup Winners Cup. In 2012 Rangers celebrated 40 years since winning the trophy by wearing a 2012–13 home strip of a similar style as the one worn during the 1972 final.

=== Reaction to pitch invasion ===
In the days following the match, Dynamo Moscow and the Soviet FA demanded a replay on the grounds of the pitch invasion which took place before the final whistle. Rangers supporters later complained about the severity and indiscriminate nature of the beatings from the police, in which many jubilant rather than violent supporters were caught up. Veteran Scottish broadcaster Archie MacPherson, who covered the game, has stated that the trouble was "eminently avoidable" and relates how Reuters' correspondent at the match remarked to him that, "What you are seeing down there is Franco's Fascist police in action". After initially denying his club's culpability, the then Rangers manager Willie Waddell criticised the fans who had invaded the pitch.

While UEFA initially seemed sympathetic with the Russians and some neutral commentators agreed that the game should be replayed, no replay was ever scheduled and Rangers kept the trophy. However, Rangers did lose the right to defend the trophy as they were handed a two-year ban from European competition following their fans' behaviour. This was later reduced to a one-year ban.

== See also ==
- 1972 European Cup Final
- 1972 UEFA Cup Final
- FC Dynamo Moscow in European football
- Rangers F.C. in European football
