= Rangers F.C. in European football =

Scottish club in European football

- Club: Rangers
- Seasons played: 62
- First entry: 1956–57 European Cup
- Latest entry: 2026–27 UEFA Conference League

Titles
- Champions League: 0 (best: semi-final)
- Europa League: 0 (best: final) (2 occasions)
- Cup Winners' Cup: 1 (1972)
- Super Cup: 0 (best: final (unofficial))
- Inter-Cities Fairs Cup: 0 (best: semi-final)

Rangers F.C. played their first official match in competitive European football on 2 October 1956.

To date, the club has featured in over 300 matches and played in four UEFA sanctioned tournaments as well as an additional two other European competitions, namely the Inter-Cities Fairs Cup and the European Super Cup.

== Overview ==
=== 1960s to 1980s ===
The club's first European opponents were Austrian side First Vienna, faced in a friendly match during a tour of Austria and Czechoslovakia in the 1903–04 season, which Rangers won 7–2. The team concluded the tour with six victories from six games. Rangers's first competitive match was a European Cup second-round match against Nice in 1956. The match ended in a 2–1 home victory for Rangers thanks to goals from Max Murray (Rangers' first European goal scorer) and Billy Simpson.

In the 1960–61 season, Rangers took part in the inaugural European Cup Winners' Cup. In this season, they became the second British club to reach a European final (emulating Birmingham City, who had reached the final of the Inter-Cities Fairs Cup the previous year), eventually losing 4–1 on aggregate to Fiorentina. Rangers were also runners-up to Bayern Munich in 1966–67. However, they did go on to win the trophy in 1972 after defeating Dynamo Moscow.

The 1982–83 season saw Rangers play in the UEFA Cup for the first time. They defeated Borussia Dortmund in the first round but were eliminated in the following round by 1. FC Köln.

=== 1990s ===
Rangers became the first Scottish club to appear in the UEFA Champions League, when in 1992 they defeated Danish side Lyngby in the first round. Rangers faced Leeds United in the second round in a tie dubbed the "Battle of Britain" due to the clubs being the respective champions of Scotland and England. In this, the inaugural season of the Champions League, the tournament was open only to national champions, with knock-out rounds leading to a group stage of eight teams in two groups of four, and only the winners of each group progressing to a one-off final match. Although unbeaten, Rangers finished second in Group A, one point behind French champions Marseille, who defeated Milan in the final. The French club were later involved in a match-fixing scandal and were stripped of their national title. It is not clear whether the group stage of the 1992–93 Champions League should be considered as a semi-final, given that the winners of each group went into the final, or as a quarter-final, given that it was contested by the last eight teams in the competition. However, Rangers' second-placed finish in their group made them one of the top four teams in that season's tournament – their highest ever finish in the Champions League and equalling their 1959–60 run to the semi-finals in its predecessor format of the competition, the European Cup.

In 1999–2000 under Dick Advocaat, the club had assembled a squad containing several Dutchmen and other internationals, at huge expense. They eliminated UEFA Cup holders Parma in the Champions League qualifying round, only to be drawn in a group containing two more of Europe's strongest teams: Bayern Munich were the 1999 runners-up, while Valencia were destined to be the 2000 runners-up, and those two clubs met in the 2001 final. Despite that quality of opposition, Rangers came close to eliminating Bayern, and after falling into the UEFA Cup, lost to Borussia Dortmund via a last-minute goal and a penalty shootout.

=== 2000s ===
In the 2000–01 UEFA Champions League, Rangers seemed poised to progress from the group after beating Sturm Graz and Monaco in the first two rounds of fixtures, but collected just two more points and finished third, with German opposition (Kaiserslautern) again swiftly ending UEFA Cup hopes.

In 2001–02, Rangers quickly dropped into the secondary competition and survived a late missed penalty to overcome Paris Saint-Germain (whose team included future Ballon d'Or winner Ronaldinho, and Mikel Arteta, who would soon move to Glasgow); they were knocked out by the eventual winners Feyenoord, inspired by former Celtic striker Pierre van Hooijdonk. By that time Alex McLeish had taken over from Advocaat, heralding an era of less lavish spending as the failure to succeed in Europe despite the heavy investment translated as worrying figures on Rangers' financial reports; this debt would later have dire consequences for the club, although in the short and medium term more domestic honours were won.

Rangers became the first Scottish club to qualify from the Champions League group stage in 2005–06, and from the UEFA Cup group stage in 2006–07.

After dropping into the 2007–08 UEFA Cup from the Champions League (where they had come close to progressing from a group including Barcelona, VfB Stuttgart and Lyon), Rangers reached the 2008 UEFA Cup final, eliminating Panathinaikos, Werder Bremen, Sporting CP and Fiorentina in a run characterised by Walter Smith's solid defensive tactics and narrow victories against strong opponents. The Manchester final saw a huge number of Rangers supporters (estimated at 150,000-200,000) make the short journey from Scotland, but the event was marred by serious disorder at one of the city's main 'fan zones' after the screen showing the match failed to function. On the field they met Russian side Zenit Saint Petersburg (coached by Dick Advocaat) at the City of Manchester Stadium but lost 2–0; aiming for four trophies, Rangers ultimately ended up with only two – the League Cup and Scottish Cup – at the end of an exhausting 68-game season.

Despite seemingly gaining valuable experience in that campaign, a surprise loss to FBK Kaunas of Lithuania followed in the opening qualification round of the Champions League in 2008–09, which did not even offer a path to the UEFA Cup at such an early stage.

=== 2010s ===
Although the financial situation continued to affect the club, three consecutive Scottish league titles between 2009 and 2011 brought further Champions League football to Ibrox, including meetings with Sevilla, Stuttgart and Manchester United, but only one win in 12 group stage matches, against Bursaspor.

The 2011–12 season was Rangers' 51st European campaign. However, due to entering administration in 2012 and the subsequent liquidation of the club's holding company, the new entity set up in its place, The Rangers International Football Club Plc, was restricted from European competition by UEFA for three seasons as rules stated they needed to present three years' worth of accounts; Rangers were therefore not eligible for participation again until 2015–16.

Rangers next qualified for Europe having finished third in the 2016–17 Scottish Premiership, however their participation in the Europa League proved to be brief and disappointing, as semi-professionals Progrès Niederkorn of Luxembourg overturned a 1–0 deficit to win 2–0 at home and advance in the Second qualifying round. The next campaign in the same competition was more successful: Rangers successfully overcame four early rounds to reach the Group Stage, where the ability of all the teams was demonstrated to be around the same level; Rangers gave a decent account of themselves but ultimately finished third and failed to progress.

Rangers qualified for the Europa League for the second consecutive season in 2019–20, beating Midtjylland and Legia Warsaw in qualifying. They were placed in a group with Porto, Feyenoord and Young Boys. Rangers performed well in the group stage, beating Porto and Feyenoord at Ibrox and drawing with both away. In their final fixture, Rangers led Young Boys 1–0 at Ibrox and were on course to progress as group winners, however an 89th-minute equaliser meant they finished 2nd behind Porto. Rangers were drawn against another Portuguese side, Braga, in the Round of 32. In the first leg at Ibrox, Rangers trailed by two goals after 60 minutes but won 3–2 after an extraordinary comeback thanks to a brace from Ianis Hagi and a goal from Joe Aribo, where he beat multiple Braga defenders to score. Rangers then won the second leg in Portugal 1–0 with a goal from Ryan Kent to progress 4–2 on aggregate. In the Round of 16, Rangers were knocked out by German side Bayer Leverkusen led by Kai Havertz, losing 4–1 on aggregate – the second leg of the tie was delayed by five months due to COVID-19 pandemic.

=== 2020s ===
In the 2020–21 season, Rangers again qualified for the Europa League group stage, meaning they had made it to the same point for the third consecutive season under Steven Gerrard – without losing or even trailing in a qualifying match. Rangers achieved impressive results during the qualifying rounds (which were played as single matches behind very small crowds or none at all due to the pandemic), beating Willem II 4–0 away and Galatasaray 2–1 at Ibrox. They were placed in Group D with Benfica, Standard Liège and Lech Poznań and continued their strong run with an away win over Standard (featuring a spectacular goal from the halfway line by Kemar Roofe), the first time the Belgians had lost a home tie in 16 matches. Another Belgian club, Royal Antwerp, were beaten home and away in the Round of 32 but the run was ended by Slavia Prague in the Round of 16 with two red cards for Rangers players and the tie ending in an angry brawl due to a racist comment made by a Slavia player.

In 2021–22, Rangers featured in the UEFA Champions League for the first time in a decade, having won the 2020–21 Scottish Premiership title without losing a match; however, their involvement was brief as Malmö FF eliminated them in the qualifying stages, exactly the scenario that had unfolded ten years earlier. The Gers recovered from this blow to reach their first European final in fourteen years, an unspectacular qualification from the Europa League group stage followed by an impressive run of victories over Borussia Dortmund, Red Star Belgrade, Braga and RB Leipzig in the knockout phase (the Dortmund tie won on the strength of an unexpected 4–2 victory at the Westfalenstadion, and first-leg away deficits in the Braga and Leipzig ties overturned in front of fervent crowds at Ibrox) on the way to facing Eintracht Frankfurt in the 2022 UEFA Europa League final at the Estadio Ramón Sánchez Pizjuán in Seville. Vital goals in the run were scored by Roofe, Kent, Alfredo Morelos (who missed the final due to injury), John Lundstram and captain James Tavernier, the competition's top scorer despite being a defender (most of his seven goals being from penalties). In the final, the clubs drew 1–1 after extra time after Aribo gave Rangers the lead; Frankfurt won 5–4 on penalties with Aaron Ramsey the only player to fail with his attempt. Veteran midfielder Steven Davis came off the bench in Seville and scored in the shootout, having started the 2008 final in Manchester.

In the 2022–23 UEFA Champions League, Rangers defeated PSV Eindhoven to qualify for the group stage for the first time since 2010–11. Drawn against Napoli, Liverpool, and Ajax, they went on to lose all six group games and ended with a -20 goal difference which was at the time the worst-ever performance in a group stage, 'beating' Dinamo Zagreb who finished on 0 points and -19 goals in 2011–12. In 2023–24, a Champions League playoff rematch with PSV this time went in the Dutch club's favour with Rangers dropping into the Europa League, where they won their group with home and away victories over Real Betis but were narrowly beaten by Benfica in the Round of 16.

The following campaign again began with a loss in the Champions League qualifiers, this time to Dynamo Kyiv, and entry to the 2024–25 UEFA Europa League which now featured a new format of a single table and each club playing eight fixtures against different opponents. An unlikely set of favourable results on the last matchday left Rangers in the top 8 places, sufficient to skip a playoff round. In the Round of 16, Fenerbahçe were beaten in Turkey but retrieved the tie at Ibrox, necessitating a penalty shootout won by the home side. At the quarter-final stage, opponents Athletic Bilbao benefitted from a man advantage after only 10 minutes but were stifled in a goalless first leg, the clearest opportunity being a penalty saved by Liam Kelly. In the second leg, a further penalty was awarded and this time scored by the Basque side, either side of which Rangers had two claims for spot kicks disregarded; a late headed goal from Nico Williams sealed the tie and ended Rangers' European involvement for the season.

== Matches ==
List of Rangers matches in European competitions
Season	Competition	Round	Opponent	Home	Away	Other	Agg.	(Note: Round or group progressed or eliminated)	Notes	Ref.
1956–57	European Cup	R2	(France) Nice	2–1	1–2	1–3	4–6		Playoff	
1957–58	European Cup	R1	(France) Saint-Étienne	3–1	1–2	—N/a	4–3		—N/a	
1957–58	European Cup	R2	(Italy) Milan	1–4	0–2	—N/a	1–6		—N/a	
1959–60	European Cup	PR	(Belgium) Anderlecht	5–2	2–0	—N/a	7–2		—N/a	
1959–60	European Cup	R1	(Czechoslovakia) Red Star Bratislava	4–3	1–1	—N/a	5–4		—N/a	
1959–60	European Cup	QF	(Netherlands) Sparta Rotterdam	0–1	3–2	3–2	6–5		Playoff	
1959–60	European Cup	SF	(West Germany) Eintracht Frankfurt	3–6	1–6	—N/a	4–12		—N/a	
1960–61	Cup Winners' Cup	R1	(Hungary) Ferencváros	4–2	1–2	—N/a	5–4		—N/a	
1960–61	Cup Winners' Cup	QF	(West Germany) Borussia Mönchengladbach	8–0	3–0	—N/a	11–0		—N/a	
1960–61	Cup Winners' Cup	SF	(England) Wolverhampton Wanderers	2–0	1–1	—N/a	3–1		—N/a	
1960–61	Cup Winners' Cup	Final	(Italy) Fiorentina	0–2	1–2	—N/a	1–4		—N/a	
1961–62	European Cup	PR	(France) Monaco	3–2	3–2	—N/a	6–4		—N/a	
1961–62	European Cup	1R	(East Germany) ASK Vorwärts Berlin	4–1	2–1	—N/a	6–2		—N/a	
1961–62	European Cup	QF	(Belgium) Standard Liège	2–0	1–4	—N/a	3–4		—N/a	
1962–63	Cup Winners' Cup	PR	(Spain) Sevilla	4–0	0–2	—N/a	4–2		—N/a	
1962–63	Cup Winners' Cup	1R	(England) Tottenham Hotspur	2–3	2–5	—N/a	4–8		—N/a	
1963–64	European Cup	PR	(Spain) Real Madrid	0–1	0–6	—N/a	0–7		—N/a	
1964–65	European Cup	1R	(Socialist Federal Republic of Yugoslavia) Red Star Belgrade	3–1	2–4	3–1	8–6		Playoff	
1964–65	European Cup	2R	(Austria) Rapid Wien	1–0	2–0	—N/a	3–0		—N/a	
1964–65	European Cup	QF	(Italy) Internazionale	1–0	1–3	—N/a	2–3		—N/a	
1966–67	Cup Winners' Cup	1R	(Northern Ireland) Glentoran	4–0	1–1	—N/a	5–1		—N/a	
1966–67	Cup Winners' Cup	2R	(West Germany) Borussia Dortmund	2–1	0–0	—N/a	2–1		—N/a	
1966–67	Cup Winners' Cup	QF	(Spain) Zaragoza	2–0	0–2	—N/a	2–2		Coin toss	
1966–67	Cup Winners' Cup	SF	(Bulgaria) Slavia Sofia	1–0	1–0	—N/a	2–0		—N/a	
1966–67	Cup Winners' Cup	Final	(West Germany) Bayern Munich	—N/a		0–1 (a.e.t.)	—N/a		—N/a	
1967–68	Fairs Cup	1R	(East Germany) Dynamo Dresden	2–1	1–1	—N/a	3–2		—N/a	
1967–68	Fairs Cup	2R	(West Germany) 1. FC Köln	3–0	1–3	—N/a	4–3		—N/a	
1967–68	Fairs Cup	3R	—N/a						Bye	
1967–68	Fairs Cup	QF	(England) Leeds United	0–0	0–2	—N/a	0–2		—N/a	
1968–69	Fairs Cup	1R	(Socialist Federal Republic of Yugoslavia) Vojvodina	2–0	0–1	—N/a	2–1		—N/a	
1968–69	Fairs Cup	2R	(Republic of Ireland) Dundalk	6–1	3–0	—N/a	9–1		—N/a	
1968–69	Fairs Cup	3R	(Netherlands) AFC DWS	2–1	2–0	—N/a	4–1		—N/a	
1968–69	Fairs Cup	QF	(Spain) Athletic Bilbao	4–1	0–2	—N/a	4–3		—N/a	
1968–69	Fairs Cup	SF	(England) Newcastle United	0–0	0–2	—N/a	0–2		—N/a	
1969–70	Cup Winners' Cup	1R	(Romania) Steaua București	0–0	2–0	—N/a	2–0		—N/a	
1969–70	Cup Winners' Cup	2R	(Poland) Górnik Zabrze	1–3	1–3	—N/a	2–6		—N/a	
1970–71	Fairs Cup	1R	(West Germany) Bayern Munich	1–1	0–1	—N/a	1–2		—N/a	
1971–72	Cup Winners' Cup	1R	(France) Rennes	1–0	1–1	—N/a	2–1		—N/a	
1971–72	Cup Winners' Cup	2R	(Portugal) Sporting CP	3–2	3–4	—N/a	6–6		Away goals	
1971–72	Cup Winners' Cup	QF	(Italy) Torino	1–0	1–1	—N/a	2–1		—N/a	
1971–72	Cup Winners' Cup	SF	(West Germany) Bayern Munich	2–0	1–1	—N/a	3–1		—N/a	
1971–72	Cup Winners' Cup	Final	(Soviet Union) Dynamo Moscow	—N/a		3–2	—N/a		—N/a	
1972–73	Super Cup	Final	(Netherlands) Ajax	1–3	2–3	—N/a	3–6		—N/a	
1973–74	Cup Winners' Cup	1R	(Turkey) Ankaragücü	4–0	2–0	—N/a	6–0		—N/a	
1973–74	Cup Winners' Cup	2R	(West Germany) Borussia Mönchengladbach	3–2	0–3	—N/a	3–5		—N/a	
1975–76	European Cup	1R	(Republic of Ireland) Bohemians	4–1	1–1	—N/a	5–2		—N/a	
1975–76	European Cup	2R	(France) Saint-Étienne	1–2	0–2	—N/a	1–4		—N/a	
1976–77	European Cup	1R	(Switzerland) Zürich	1–1	0–1	—N/a	1–2		—N/a	
1977–78	Cup Winners' Cup	QR	(Switzerland) Young Boys	1–0	2–2	—N/a	3–2		—N/a	
1977–78	Cup Winners' Cup	1R	(Netherlands) Twente	0–0	0–3	—N/a	0–3		—N/a	
1978–79	European Cup	1R	(Italy) Juventus	2–0	0–1	—N/a	2–1		—N/a	
1978–79	European Cup	2R	(Netherlands) PSV Eindhoven	0–0	3–2	—N/a	3–2		—N/a	
1978–79	European Cup	QF	(West Germany) 1. FC Köln	1–1	0–1	—N/a	1–2		—N/a	
1979–80	Cup Winners' Cup	PR	(Norway) Lillestrøm	1–0	2–0	—N/a	3–0		—N/a	
1979–80	Cup Winners' Cup	1R	(West Germany) Fortuna Düsseldorf	2–1	0–0	—N/a	2–1		—N/a	
1979–80	Cup Winners' Cup	2R	(Spain) Valencia	1–3	1–1	—N/a	2–4		—N/a	
1981–82	Cup Winners' Cup	1R	(Czechoslovakia) Dukla Prague	2–1	0–3	—N/a	2–4		—N/a	
1982–83	UEFA Cup	1R	(West Germany) Borussia Dortmund	2–0	0–0	—N/a	2–0		—N/a	
1982–83	UEFA Cup	2R	(West Germany) 1. FC Köln	2–1	0–5	—N/a	2–6		—N/a	
1983–84	Cup Winners' Cup	1R	(Malta) Valletta	10–0	8–0	—N/a	18–0		—N/a	
1983–84	Cup Winners' Cup	2R	(Portugal) Porto	2–1	0–1	—N/a	2–2		Away goals	
1984–85	UEFA Cup	1R	(Republic of Ireland) Bohemians	2–0	2–3	—N/a	4–3		—N/a	
1984–85	UEFA Cup	2R	(Italy) Internazionale	3–1	0–3	—N/a	3–4		—N/a	
1985–86	UEFA Cup	1R	(Spain) Osasuna	1–0	0–2	—N/a	1–2		—N/a	
1986–87	UEFA Cup	1R	(Finland) Ilves	4–0	0–2	—N/a	4–2		—N/a	
1986–87	UEFA Cup	2R	(Portugal) Boavista	2–1	1–0	—N/a	3–1		—N/a	
1986–87	UEFA Cup	3R	(West Germany) Borussia Mönchengladbach	1–1	0–0	—N/a	1–1		Away goals	
1987–88	European Cup	1R	(Soviet Union) Dynamo Kyiv	2–0	0–1	—N/a	2–1		—N/a	
1987–88	European Cup	2R	(Poland) Górnik Zabrze	3–1	1–1	—N/a	4–2		—N/a	
1987–88	European Cup	QF	(Romania) Steaua București	2–1	0–2	—N/a	2–3		—N/a	
1988–89	UEFA Cup	1R	(Poland) GKS Katowice	1–0	4–2	—N/a	5–2		—N/a	
1988–89	UEFA Cup	2R	(West Germany) 1. FC Köln	1–1	0–2	—N/a	1–3		—N/a	
1989–90	European Cup	1R	(West Germany) Bayern Munich	1–3	0–0	—N/a	1–3		—N/a	
1990–91	European Cup	1R	(Malta) Valletta	6–0	4–0	—N/a	10–0		—N/a	
1990–91	European Cup	2R	(Socialist Federal Republic of Yugoslavia) Red Star Belgrade	1–1	0–3	—N/a	1–4		—N/a	
1991–92	European Cup	1R	(Czechoslovakia) Sparta Prague	2–1	0–1	—N/a	2–2		Away goals	
1992–93	UEFA Champions League	1R	(Denmark) Lyngby	2–0	1–0	—N/a	3–0		—N/a	
1992–93	UEFA Champions League	2R	(England) Leeds United	2–1	2–1	—N/a	4–2		—N/a	
1992–93	UEFA Champions League	Group A	(France) Olympique Marseille	2–2	1–1	—N/a	2nd		—N/a	
1992–93	UEFA Champions League	Group A	(Russia) CSKA Moscow	0–0	1–0	—N/a	2nd		—N/a	
1992–93	UEFA Champions League	Group A	(Belgium) Club Brugge	2–1	1–1	—N/a	2nd		—N/a	
1993–94	UEFA Champions League	1R	(Bulgaria) Levski Sofia	3–2	1–2	—N/a	4–4		Away goals	
1994–95	UEFA Champions League	QR	(Greece) AEK Athens	0–1	0–2	—N/a	0–3		—N/a	
1995–96	UEFA Champions League	QR	(Cyprus) Anorthosis Famagusta	1–0	0–0	—N/a	1–0		—N/a	
1995–96	UEFA Champions League	Group C	(Romania) Steaua București	1–1	0–1	—N/a	4th		—N/a	
1995–96	UEFA Champions League	Group C	(Germany) Borussia Dortmund	2–2	2–2	—N/a	4th		—N/a	
1995–96	UEFA Champions League	Group C	(Italy) Juventus	0–4	1–4	—N/a	4th		—N/a	
1996–97	UEFA Champions League	QR	(Russia) Alania Vladikavkaz	3–1	7–2	—N/a	10–3		—N/a	
1996–97	UEFA Champions League	Group A	(Switzerland) Grasshoppers	2–1	0–3	—N/a	4th		—N/a	
1996–97	UEFA Champions League	Group A	(France) Auxerre	1–2	1–2	—N/a	4th		—N/a	
1996–97	UEFA Champions League	Group A	(Netherlands) Ajax	0–1	1–4	—N/a	4th		—N/a	
1997–98	UEFA Champions League	QR1	(Faroe Islands) GÍ	6–0	5–0	—N/a	11–0		—N/a	
1997–98	UEFA Champions League	QR2	(Sweden) IFK Göteborg	1–1	0–3	—N/a	1–4		—N/a	
1997–98	UEFA Cup	1R	(France) Strasbourg	1–2	1–2	—N/a	2–4		—N/a	
1998–99	UEFA Cup	QR1	(Republic of Ireland) Shelbourne	2–0	5–3	—N/a	7–3		—N/a	
1998–99	UEFA Cup	QR2	(Greece) PAOK	2–0	0–0	—N/a	2–0		—N/a	
1998–99	UEFA Cup	1R	(Israel) Beitar Jerusalem	4–2	1–1	—N/a	5–3		—N/a	
1998–99	UEFA Cup	2R	(Germany) Bayer Leverkusen	1–1	2–1	—N/a	3–2		—N/a	
1998–99	UEFA Cup	3R	(Italy) Parma	1–1	1–3	—N/a	2–4		—N/a	
1999–2000	UEFA Champions League	QR2	(Finland) Haka	3–0	4–1	—N/a	7–1		—N/a	
1999–2000	UEFA Champions League	QR3	(Italy) Parma	2–0	0–1	—N/a	2–1		—N/a	
1999–2000	UEFA Champions League	Group F	(Spain) Valencia	1–2	0–2	—N/a	3rd		—N/a	
1999–2000	UEFA Champions League	Group F	(Germany) Bayern Munich	1–1	0–1	—N/a	3rd		—N/a	
1999–2000	UEFA Champions League	Group F	(Netherlands) PSV Eindhoven	4–1	1–0	—N/a	3rd		—N/a	
1999–2000	UEFA Cup	3R	(Germany) Borussia Dortmund	2–0	0–2 (a.e.t.)	—N/a	2–2		Penalties	
2000–01	UEFA Champions League	QR2	(Lithuania) FBK Kaunas	4–1	0–0	—N/a	4–1		—N/a	
2000–01	UEFA Champions League	QR3	(Denmark) Herfølge	3–0	3–0	—N/a	6–0		—N/a	
2000–01	UEFA Champions League	Group D	(Austria) Sturm Graz	5–0	0–2	—N/a	3rd		—N/a	
2000–01	UEFA Champions League	Group D	(France) Monaco	2–2	1–0	—N/a	3rd		—N/a	
2000–01	UEFA Champions League	Group D	(Turkey) Galatasaray	0–0	2–3	—N/a	3rd		—N/a	
2000–01	UEFA Cup	3R	(Germany) 1. FC Kaiserslautern	1–0	0–3	—N/a	1–3		—N/a	
2001–02	UEFA Champions League	QR2	(Slovenia) Maribor	3–1	3–0	—N/a	6–1		—N/a	
2001–02	UEFA Champions League	QR3	(Turkey) Fenerbahçe	0–0	1–2	—N/a	1–2		—N/a	
2001–02	UEFA Cup	1R	(Russia) Anzhi Makhachkala	—N/a		1–0	—N/a		—N/a	
2001–02	UEFA Cup	2R	(Russia) Dynamo Moscow	3–1	4–1	—N/a	7–2		—N/a	
2001–02	UEFA Cup	3R	(France) Paris Saint-Germain	0–0	0–0 (a.e.t.)	—N/a	0–0		Penalties	
2001–02	UEFA Cup	4R	(Netherlands) Feyenoord	1–1	2–3	—N/a	3–4		—N/a	
2002–03	UEFA Cup	1R	(Czech Republic) Viktoria Žižkov	3–1	0–2	—N/a	3–3		Away goals	
2003–04	UEFA Champions League	QR3	(Denmark) Copenhagen	1–1	2–1	—N/a	3–2		—N/a	
2003–04	UEFA Champions League	Group E	(Germany) VfB Stuttgart	2–1	0–1	—N/a	4th		—N/a	
2003–04	UEFA Champions League	Group E	(Greece) Panathinaikos	1–3	1–1	—N/a	4th		—N/a	
2003–04	UEFA Champions League	Group E	(England) Manchester United	0–1	0–3	—N/a	4th		—N/a	
2004–05	UEFA Champions League	QR3	(Russia) CSKA Moscow	1–1	1–2	—N/a	2–3		—N/a	
2004–05	UEFA Cup	R1	(Portugal) Marítimo	1–0 (a.e.t.)	0–1	—N/a	1–1		Penalties	
2004–05	UEFA Cup	Group F	(Poland) Amica Wronki	—N/a	5–0	—N/a	4th		—N/a	
2004–05	UEFA Cup	Group F	(Austria) Grazer AK	3–0	—N/a	—N/a	4th		—N/a	
2004–05	UEFA Cup	Group F	(Netherlands) AZ	—N/a	0–1	—N/a	4th		—N/a	
2004–05	UEFA Cup	Group F	(France) Auxerre	0–2	—N/a	—N/a	4th		—N/a	
2005–06	UEFA Champions League	QR3	(Cyprus) Anorthosis Famagusta	2–0	2–1	—N/a	4–1		—N/a	
2005–06	UEFA Champions League	Group H	(Portugal) Porto	3–2	1–1	—N/a	2nd		—N/a	
2005–06	UEFA Champions League	Group H	(Italy) Internazionale	1–1	0–1	—N/a	2nd		—N/a	
2005–06	UEFA Champions League	Group H	(Slovakia) Artmedia Bratislava	0–0	2–2	—N/a	2nd		—N/a	
2005–06	UEFA Champions League	R16	(Spain) Villarreal	2–2	1–1	—N/a	3–3		Away goals	
2006–07	UEFA Cup	R1	(Norway) Molde	2–0	0–0	—N/a	2–0		—N/a	
2006–07	UEFA Cup	Group A	(Italy) Livorno	—N/a	3–2	—N/a	1st		—N/a	
2006–07	UEFA Cup	Group A	(Israel) Maccabi Haifa	2–0	—N/a	—N/a	1st		—N/a	
2006–07	UEFA Cup	Group A	(France) Auxerre	—N/a	2–2	—N/a	1st		—N/a	
2006–07	UEFA Cup	Group A	(Serbia) Partizan	1–0	—N/a	—N/a	1st		—N/a	
2006–07	UEFA Cup	R3	(Israel) Hapoel Tel Aviv	4–0	1–2	—N/a	5–2		—N/a	
2006–07	UEFA Cup	R4	(Spain) Osasuna	1–1	0–1	—N/a	1–2		—N/a	
2007–08	UEFA Champions League	QR2	(Montenegro) Zeta	2–0	1–0	—N/a	3–0		—N/a	
2007–08	UEFA Champions League	QR3	(Serbia) Red Star Belgrade	1–0	0–0	—N/a	1–0		—N/a	
2007–08	UEFA Champions League	Group E	(Germany) VfB Stuttgart	2–1	2–3	—N/a	3rd		—N/a	
2007–08	UEFA Champions League	Group E	(France) Lyon	0–3	3–0	—N/a	3rd		—N/a	
2007–08	UEFA Champions League	Group E	(Spain) Barcelona	0–0	0–2	—N/a	3rd		—N/a	
2007–08	UEFA Cup	3R	(Greece) Panathinaikos	0–0	1–1	—N/a	1–1		Away goals	
2007–08	UEFA Cup	4R	(Germany) Werder Bremen	2–0	0–1	—N/a	2–1		—N/a	
2007–08	UEFA Cup	QF	(Portugal) Sporting CP	0–0	2–0	—N/a	2–0		—N/a	
2007–08	UEFA Cup	SF	(Italy) Fiorentina	0–0	0–0 (a.e.t.)	—N/a	0–0		Penalties	
2007–08	UEFA Cup	Final	(Russia) Zenit Saint Petersburg	—N/a		0–2	—N/a		—N/a	
2008–09	UEFA Champions League	QR2	(Lithuania) FBK Kaunas	0–0	1–2	—N/a	1–2		—N/a	
2009–10	UEFA Champions League	Group G	(Germany) VfB Stuttgart	0–2	1–1	—N/a	4th		—N/a	
2009–10	UEFA Champions League	Group G	(Spain) Sevilla	1–4	0–1	—N/a	4th		—N/a	
2009–10	UEFA Champions League	Group G	(Romania) Unirea Urziceni	1–4	1–1	—N/a	4th		—N/a	
2010–11	UEFA Champions League	Group C	(England) Manchester United	0–1	0–0	—N/a	3rd		—N/a	
2010–11	UEFA Champions League	Group C	(Turkey) Bursaspor	1–0	1–1	—N/a	3rd		—N/a	
2010–11	UEFA Champions League	Group C	(Spain) Valencia	1–1	0–3	—N/a	3rd		—N/a	
2010–11	UEFA Europa League	R32	(Portugal) Sporting CP	1–1	2–2	—N/a	3–3		Away goals	
2010–11	UEFA Europa League	R16	(Netherlands) PSV Eindhoven	0–1	0–0	—N/a	0–1		—N/a	
2011–12	UEFA Champions League	QR3	(Sweden) Malmö FF	0–1	1–1	—N/a	1–2		—N/a	
2011–12	UEFA Europa League	POR	(Slovenia) Maribor	1–1	1–2	—N/a	2–3		—N/a	
2017–18	UEFA Europa League	QR1	(Luxembourg) Progrès Niederkorn	1–0	0–2	—N/a	1–2		—N/a	
2018–19	UEFA Europa League	QR1	(North Macedonia) Shkupi	2−0	0−0	—N/a	2−0		—N/a	
2018–19	UEFA Europa League	QR2	(Croatia) Osijek	1−1	1−0	—N/a	2–1		—N/a	
2018–19	UEFA Europa League	QR3	(Slovenia) Maribor	3−1	0−0	—N/a	3−1		—N/a	
2018–19	UEFA Europa League	POR	(Russia) Ufa	1−0	1−1	—N/a	2−1		—N/a	
2018–19	UEFA Europa League	Group G	(Austria) Rapid Wien	3−1	0−1	—N/a	3rd		—N/a	
2018–19	UEFA Europa League	Group G	(Russia) Spartak Moscow	0−0	3−4	—N/a	3rd		—N/a	
2018–19	UEFA Europa League	Group G	(Spain) Villarreal	0−0	2−2	—N/a	3rd		—N/a	
2019–20	UEFA Europa League	QR1	(Gibraltar) St Joseph's	6−0	4−0	—N/a	10−0		—N/a	
2019–20	UEFA Europa League	QR2	(Luxembourg) Progrès Niederkorn	2−0	0−0	—N/a	2−0		—N/a	
2019–20	UEFA Europa League	QR3	(Denmark) Midtjylland	3–1	4–2	—N/a	7–3		—N/a	
2019–20	UEFA Europa League	POR	(Poland) Legia Warsaw	1–0	0–0	—N/a	1–0		—N/a	
2019–20	UEFA Europa League	Group G	(Portugal) Porto	2−0	1–1	—N/a	2nd		—N/a	
2019–20	UEFA Europa League	Group G	(Switzerland) Young Boys	1–1	1−2	—N/a	2nd		—N/a	
2019–20	UEFA Europa League	Group G	(Netherlands) Feyenoord	1–0	2−2	—N/a	2nd		—N/a	
2019–20	UEFA Europa League	R32	(Portugal) Braga	3–2	1–0	—N/a	4–2		—N/a	
2019–20	UEFA Europa League	R16	(Germany) Bayer Leverkusen	1−3	0–1	—N/a	1–4		—N/a	
2020–21	UEFA Europa League	QR2	(Gibraltar) Lincoln Red Imps	—N/a	5–0	—N/a	—N/a		—N/a	
2020–21	UEFA Europa League	QR3	(Netherlands) Willem II	—N/a	4–0	—N/a	—N/a		—N/a	
2020–21	UEFA Europa League	POR	(Turkey) Galatasaray	2–1	—N/a	—N/a	—N/a		—N/a	
2020–21	UEFA Europa League	Group D	(Portugal) Benfica	2−2	3−3	—N/a	1st		—N/a	
2020–21	UEFA Europa League	Group D	(Belgium) Standard Liège	3–2	2–0	—N/a	1st		—N/a	
2020–21	UEFA Europa League	Group D	(Poland) Lech Poznań	1–0	2–0	—N/a	1st		—N/a	
2020–21	UEFA Europa League	R32	(Belgium) Antwerp	5–2	4–3	—N/a	9–5		—N/a	
2020–21	UEFA Europa League	R16	(Czech Republic) Slavia Prague	0–2	1–1	—N/a	1–3		—N/a	
2021–22	UEFA Champions League	QR3	(Sweden) Malmö FF	1–2	1–2	—N/a	2−4		—N/a	
2021–22	UEFA Europa League	POR	(Armenia) Alashkert	1–0	0–0	—N/a	1–0		—N/a	
2021–22	UEFA Europa League	Group A	(France) Lyon	0–2	1–1	—N/a	2nd		—N/a	
2021–22	UEFA Europa League	Group A	(Czech Republic) Sparta Prague	2–0	0–1	—N/a	2nd		—N/a	
2021–22	UEFA Europa League	Group A	(Denmark) Brøndby	2–0	1–1	—N/a	2nd		—N/a	
2021–22	UEFA Europa League	KPO	(Germany) Borussia Dortmund	2–2	4–2	—N/a	6–4		—N/a	
2021–22	UEFA Europa League	R16	(Serbia) Red Star Belgrade	3–0	1–2	—N/a	4–2		—N/a	
2021–22	UEFA Europa League	QF	(Portugal) Braga	3–1 (a.e.t.)	0–1	—N/a	3–2		—N/a	
2021–22	UEFA Europa League	SF	(Germany) RB Leipzig	3–1	0–1	—N/a	3–2		—N/a	
2021–22	UEFA Europa League	Final	(Germany) Eintracht Frankfurt	—N/a		1–1 (a.e.t.)	—N/a		Penalties	
2022–23	UEFA Champions League	QR3	(Belgium) Union Saint-Gilloise	3–0	0–2	—N/a	3–2		—N/a	
2022–23	UEFA Champions League	POR	(Netherlands) PSV Eindhoven	2–2	1–0	—N/a	3–2		—N/a	
2022–23	UEFA Champions League	Group A	(Netherlands) Ajax	1–3	0–4	—N/a	4th		—N/a	
2022–23	UEFA Champions League	Group A	(Italy) Napoli	0–3	0–3	—N/a	4th		—N/a	
2022–23	UEFA Champions League	Group A	(England) Liverpool	1–7	0–2	—N/a	4th		—N/a	
2023–24	UEFA Champions League	QR3	(Switzerland) Servette	2–1	1–1	—N/a	3–2		—N/a	
2023–24	UEFA Champions League	POR	(Netherlands) PSV Eindhoven	2–2	1–5	—N/a	3–7		—N/a	
2023–24	UEFA Europa League	Group C	(Spain) Real Betis	1–0	3–2	—N/a	1st		—N/a	
2023–24	UEFA Europa League	Group C	(Cyprus) Aris Limassol	1–1	1–2	—N/a	1st		—N/a	
2023–24	UEFA Europa League	Group C	(Czech Republic) Sparta Prague	2–1	0–0	—N/a	1st		—N/a	
2023–24	UEFA Europa League	R16	(Portugal) Benfica	0–1	2–2	—N/a	2–3		—N/a	
2024–25	UEFA Champions League	QR3	(Ukraine) Dynamo Kyiv	0–2	1–1	—N/a	1–3		—N/a	
2024–25	UEFA Europa League	League phase	(Sweden) Malmö FF	—N/a	2–0	—N/a	8th		—N/a	
2024–25	UEFA Europa League	League phase	(France) Lyon	1–4	—N/a	—N/a	8th		—N/a	
2024–25	UEFA Europa League	League phase	(Romania) FCSB	4–0	—N/a	—N/a	8th		—N/a	
2024–25	UEFA Europa League	League phase	(Greece) Olympiacos	—N/a	1–1	—N/a	8th		—N/a	
2024–25	UEFA Europa League	League phase	(France) Nice	—N/a	4–1	—N/a	8th		—N/a	
2024–25	UEFA Europa League	League phase	(England) Tottenham Hotspur	1–1	—N/a	—N/a	8th		—N/a	
2024–25	UEFA Europa League	League phase	(England) Manchester United	—N/a	1–2	—N/a	8th		—N/a	
2024–25	UEFA Europa League	League phase	(Belgium) Union Saint-Gilloise	2–1	—N/a	—N/a	8th		—N/a	
2024–25	UEFA Europa League	R16	(Turkey) Fenerbahçe	0–2 (a.e.t.)	3–1	—N/a	3–3		Penalties	
2024–25	UEFA Europa League	QF	(Spain) Athletic Bilbao	0–0	0–2	—N/a	0–2		—N/a	
2025–26	UEFA Champions League	QR2	(Greece) Panathinaikos	2–0	1–1	—N/a	3–1		—N/a	
2025–26	UEFA Champions League	QR3	(Czech Republic) Viktoria Plzeň	3–0	1–2	—N/a	4–2		—N/a	
2025–26	UEFA Champions League	POR	(Belgium) Club Brugge	1–3	0–6	—N/a	1–9		—N/a	
2025–26	UEFA Europa League	League phase	(Belgium) Genk	0–1	—N/a	—N/a	32nd		—N/a	
2025–26	UEFA Europa League	League phase	(Austria) Sturm Graz	—N/a	1–2	—N/a	32nd		—N/a	
2025–26	UEFA Europa League	League phase	(Norway) Brann	—N/a	0–3	—N/a	32nd		—N/a	
2025–26	UEFA Europa League	League phase	(Italy) Roma	0–2	—N/a	—N/a	32nd		—N/a	
2025–26	UEFA Europa League	League phase	(Portugal) Braga	1–1	—N/a	—N/a	32nd		—N/a	
2025–26	UEFA Europa League	League phase	(Hungary) Ferencváros	—N/a	1–2	—N/a	32nd		—N/a	
2025–26	UEFA Europa League	League phase	(Bulgaria) Ludogorets Razgrad	1–0	—N/a	—N/a	32nd		—N/a	
2025–26	UEFA Europa League	League phase	(Portugal) Porto	—N/a	1–3	—N/a	32nd		—N/a	
2026–27	UEFA Europa League	QR3	(Poland) Jagiellonia Białystok	1–1	1–2	—N/a	2–3		—N/a	
2026–27	UEFA Conference League	POR	(Czech Republic) Jablonec	1–0	0–1 (a.e.t.)	—N/a	1–1		Penalties	

== Record by country of opposition ==
- Updated as of 27 August 2026
- Pld – Played; W – Won; D – Drawn; L – Lost

Country	Pld	W	D	L	Win %
Armenia	2	1	1	0	50
Austria	8	5	0	3	62.50
Belgium	16	10	1	5	62.50
Bulgaria	5	4	0	1	80
Croatia	2	1	1	0	50
Cyprus	6	3	2	1	50
Czechoslovakia	6	3	1	2	50
Czech Republic	12	5	2	5	41.67
Denmark	10	8	2	0	80
East Germany	4	3	1	0	75
England	18	3	5	10	16.67
Faroe Islands	2	2	0	0	100
Finland	4	3	0	1	75
France	29	8	8	13	27.58
Germany	54	17	17	20	31.48
Gibraltar	3	3	0	0	100
Greece	11	2	6	3	18.18
Hungary	3	1	0	2	33.33
Israel	5	3	1	1	60
Italy	26	6	5	15	23.08
Lithuania	4	1	2	1	25
Luxembourg	4	2	1	1	50
Malta	4	4	0	0	100
Montenegro	2	2	0	0	100
Netherlands	29	10	7	12	34.48
North Macedonia	2	1	1	0	50
Northern Ireland	2	1	1	0	50
Norway	5	3	1	1	60
Poland	13	7	3	3	53.85
Portugal	26	11	9	6	42.31
Republic of Ireland	8	6	1	1	75
Romania	9	3	3	3	33.33
Russia	14	7	4	3	50
Serbia	5	3	1	1	60
Slovakia	2	0	2	0	0
Slovenia	6	3	2	1	50
Spain	30	6	9	15	20
Sweden	7	1	2	4	14.29
Switzerland	10	3	4	3	30
Turkey	11	5	3	3	45.45
Ukraine	2	0	1	1	0
Soviet Union	3	2	0	1	66.67
Yugoslavia	7	3	1	3	42.85

== Competition summary ==
Updated as of 27 August 2026

Competition	Campaigns	Pld	W	D	L	GF	GA	GD
European Cup / UEFA Champions League	35	185	67	45	73	256	271	−15
European Cup Winners' Cup	10	54	27	11	16	100	62	+38
UEFA Cup / UEFA Europa League	24	170	72	51	47	244	178	+66
UEFA Conference League	1	2	1	0	1	1	1	0
European Super Cup	1	2	0	0	2	3	6	−3
Inter-Cities Fairs Cup	3	18	8	4	6	27	17	+10
Total	74	431	175	111	145	631	535	+96

== Honours ==
Honour	Winners		Runners-up	
European Cup Winners' Cup	1	1971–72	2	1960–61, 1966–67
UEFA Cup / UEFA Europa League	0		2	2007–08, 2021–22
European Super Cup	0		1	1972
Total	1		5	
