= 1972–73 Scottish Cup =

Tournament details
- Country: Scotland

Final positions
- Champions: Rangers
- Runners-up: Celtic

The 1972–73 Scottish Cup was the 88th staging of Scotland's most prestigious football knockout competition. The Cup was won by Rangers who defeated Celtic in the final.

== First round ==
Home team	Score	Away team
Babcock & Wilcox	0–2	Berwick Rangers
Brechin City	0–0	Clydebank
East Stirlingshire	1–0	Ross County
Ferranti Thistle	3–1	Duns
Montrose	2–0	Albion Rovers

=== Replays ===
Home team	Score	Away team
Clydebank	1–2	Brechin City

== Second round ==
Home team	Score	Away team
Queen of the South	2–0	Forfar Athletic
Alloa Athletic	0–2	Berwick Rangers
Brechin City	0–0	East Stirlingshire
Brora Rangers	0–4	Hamilton Academical
Ferranti Thistle	2–2	Elgin City
Inverness Thistle	2–1	Queen's Park
Stenhousemuir	0–0	Raith Rovers
Vale of Leithen	0–3	Montrose

=== Replays ===
Home team	Score	Away team
East Stirlingshire	1–2	Brechin City
Elgin City	2–1	Ferranti Thistle
Raith Rovers	3–0	Stenhousemuir

== Third round ==
Home team	Score	Away team
Ayr United	3–0	Inverness Thistle
Berwick Rangers	1–3	Falkirk
Brechin City	2–4	Aberdeen
Celtic	4–1	East Fife
Clyde	1–1	Montrose
Dumbarton	4–1	Cowdenbeath
Dunfermline Athletic	0–3	Dundee
Elgin City	0–1	Hamilton Academical
Hearts	0–0	Airdrieonians
Hibernian	2–0	Greenock Morton
Kilmarnock	2–1	Queen of the South
Motherwell	2–1	Raith Rovers
Rangers	1–0	Dundee United
St Mirren	0–1	Partick Thistle
Stirling Albion	3–3	Arbroath
Stranraer	1–1	St Johnstone

=== Replays ===
Home team	Score	Away team
Airdrieonians	3–1	Hearts
Arbroath	0–1	Stirling Albion
Montrose	4–2	Clyde
St Johnstone	1–2	Stranraer

== Fourth round ==
Home team	Score	Away team
Aberdeen	3–1	Falkirk
Ayr United	2–1	Stirling Albion
Dumbarton	2–2	Partick Thistle
Kilmarnock	0–1	Airdrieonians
Montrose	2–2	Hamilton Academical
Motherwell	0–4	Celtic
Rangers	1–1	Hibernian
Stranraer	2–9	Dundee

=== Replays ===
Home team	Score	Away team
Hamilton Academical	0–1	Montrose
Hibernian	1–2	Rangers
Partick Thistle	3–1	Dumbarton

== Quarter-finals ==
Home team	Score	Away team
Celtic	0–0	Aberdeen
Montrose	1–4	Dundee
Partick Thistle	1–5	Ayr United
Rangers	2–0	Airdrieonians

=== Replays ===
Home team	Score	Away team
Aberdeen	0–1	Celtic

== Semi-finals ==
4 April 1973

Rangers	2–0	Ayr United

Attendance: 51,815

7 April 1973

Celtic	0–0	Dundee

Attendance: 55,428

=== Replays ===
11 April 1973

Celtic	3–0 (a.e.t.)	Dundee

Attendance: 47,384

== Final ==
5 May 1973

Rangers	3–2	Celtic
Parlane 35'; Conn 46'; Forsyth 60'	Report	24' Dalglish; 51' (pen.) Connelly

Hampden Park, Glasgow
Attendance: 122,714
Referee: John Gordon

=== Teams ===
Rangers:
GK	(Scotland) Peter McCloy
DF	(Scotland) Sandy Jardine
DF	(Scotland) John Greig (c)
DF	(Scotland) Tom Forsyth
DF	(Scotland) Willie Mathieson
MF	(Scotland) Tommy McLean
MF	(Scotland) Alfie Conn
MF	(Scotland) Alex MacDonald
MF	(Scotland) Quinton Young
FW	(Scotland) Derek Johnstone
FW	(Scotland) Derek Parlane
Substitutes:
?
Manager:
(Scotland) Jock Wallace

Celtic:
GK	(Scotland) Ally Hunter
DF	(Scotland) Danny McGrain
DF	(Scotland) Billy McNeill (c)
DF	(Scotland) George Connelly
DF	(Scotland) Jim Brogan	(substituted off) ?'
MF	(Scotland) Jimmy Johnstone
MF	(Scotland) David Hay
MF	(Scotland) Bobby Murdoch
MF	(Scotland) Tommy Callaghan
FW	(Scotland) Kenny Dalglish
FW	(Scotland) Dixie Deans
Substitutes:
MF	(Scotland) Bobby Lennox	(substituted on) ?'
Manager:
(Scotland) Jock Stein

== See also ==
- 1972–73 in Scottish football
- 1972–73 Scottish League Cup
