= 1972–73 in Scottish football =

Association football season

Division One champions
- Celtic

Division Two champions
- Clyde

Scottish Cup winners
- Rangers

League Cup winners
- Hibernian

Junior Cup winners
- Irvine Meadow XI

Teams in Europe
- Aberdeen, Celtic, Hibernian, Partick Thistle

Scotland national team
- 1973 BHC, 1974 World cup qualification

The 1972–73 season was the 100th season of competitive football in Scotland and the 76th season of Scottish league football.

== Scottish League Division One ==
Pos	Team	Pld	W	D	L	GF	GA	GD	Pts	Qualification or relegation
1	Celtic	34	26	5	3	93	28	+65	57	Champion
2	Rangers	34	26	4	4	74	30	+44	56	
3	Hibernian	34	19	7	8	74	33	+41	45	
4	Aberdeen	34	16	11	7	61	34	+27	43	
5	Dundee	34	17	9	8	68	43	+25	43	
6	Ayr United	34	16	8	10	50	51	−1	40	
7	Dundee United	34	17	5	12	56	51	+5	39	
8	Motherwell	34	11	9	14	38	48	−10	31	
9	East Fife	34	11	8	15	46	54	−8	30	
10	Heart of Midlothian	34	12	6	16	39	50	−11	30	
11	St Johnstone	34	10	9	15	52	67	−15	29	
12	Morton	34	10	8	16	47	53	−6	28	
13	Partick Thistle	34	10	8	16	40	53	−13	28	
14	Falkirk	34	7	12	15	38	56	−18	26	
15	Arbroath	34	9	8	17	39	63	−24	26	
16	Dumbarton	34	6	11	17	43	72	−29	23	
17	Kilmarnock	34	7	8	19	40	71	−31	22	Relegated to 1973–74 Second Division
18	Airdrieonians	34	4	8	22	34	75	−41	16	Relegated to 1973–74 Second Division

Source: Soccerbase and League Tables

Champions: Celtic
Relegated: Kilmarnock, Airdrieonians

== Scottish League Division Two ==
Pos	Team	Pld	W	D	L	GF	GA	GD	Pts	Promotion or relegation
1	Clyde	36	23	10	3	68	28	+40	56	Promotion to the 1973–74 First Division
2	Dunfermline Athletic	36	23	6	7	95	32	+63	52	Promotion to the 1973–74 First Division
3	Stirling Albion	36	19	9	8	70	39	+31	47	
4	Raith Rovers	36	19	9	8	73	42	+31	47	
5	St Mirren	36	19	7	10	79	50	+29	45	
6	Montrose	36	18	8	10	82	58	+24	44	
7	Cowdenbeath	36	14	10	12	57	53	+4	38	
8	Hamilton Academical	36	16	6	14	67	63	+4	38	
9	Berwick Rangers	36	16	5	15	45	54	−9	37	
10	Stenhousemuir	36	14	8	14	44	41	+3	36	
11	Queen of the South	36	13	8	15	45	52	−7	34	
12	Alloa Athletic	36	11	11	14	45	49	−4	33	
13	East Stirlingshire	36	12	8	16	52	69	−17	32	
14	Queen's Park	36	9	12	15	44	61	−17	30	
15	Stranraer	36	13	4	19	56	78	−22	30	
16	Forfar Athletic	36	10	9	17	38	66	−28	29	
17	Clydebank	36	9	6	21	48	72	−24	24	
18	Albion Rovers	36	5	8	23	35	83	−48	18	
19	Brechin City	36	5	4	27	46	99	−53	14	

Source: "1972-1973 Second Division - SPFL Archive". SPFL (in Malay).

Promoted: Clyde, Dunfermline Athletic

== Cup honours ==
Competition	Winner	Score	Runner-up
Scottish Cup 1972–73	Rangers	3 – 2	Celtic
League Cup 1972–73	Hibernian	2 – 1	Celtic
Junior Cup	Irvine Meadow XI	1 – 0 †	Cambuslang Rangers

† – second replay

== Other honours ==
=== National ===
Competition	Winner	Score	Runner-up
Scottish Qualifying Cup – North	Clachnacuddin	3 – 1 *	Ross County
Scottish Qualifying Cup – South	Ferranti Thistle	6 – 0 *	Civil Service Strollers

=== County ===
Competition	Winner	Score	Runner-up
Aberdeenshire Cup	Fraserburgh		
Ayrshire Cup	Kilmarnock	2 – 1 *	Ayr United
East of Scotland Shield	Hearts	2 – 1	Berwick Rangers
Fife Cup	Dunfermline Athletic		
Forfarshire Cup	Montrose	2 – 1	Dundee United
Lanarkshire Cup	Motherwell	4 – 1	Airdrie
Renfrewshire Cup	Morton	3 – 2 *	St Mirren
Stirlingshire Cup	Dumbarton	6 – 0	East Stirling

^{*} – aggregate over two legs

=== Highland League ===
Top Three
Pos	Team	Pld	W	D	L	GF	GA	GD	Pts
1	Inverness Thistle	30	22	3	5	106	44	+62	47
2	Ross County	30	20	7	3	72	34	+38	47
3	Huntly	30	20	4	6	69	32	+37	44

== Individual honours ==
Award	Winner	Club
Footballer of the Year	(Scotland) George Connelly	Celtic

== Scotland national team ==
Date	Venue	Opponents	Score	Competition	Scotland scorer(s)
18 October	Idraetsparken, Copenhagen (A)	Denmark	4–1	WCQG8	Lou Macari, Jimmy Bone, Joe Harper, Willie Morgan
15 November	Hampden Park, Glasgow (H)	Denmark	2–0	WCQG8	Kenny Dalglish, Peter Lorimer
14 February	Hampden Park, Glasgow (H)	England	0–5	Friendly	
12 May	The Racecourse, Wrexham (A)	Wales	2–0	BHC	George Graham (2)
16 May	Hampden Park, Glasgow (H)	Northern Ireland	1–2	BHC	Kenny Dalglish
19 May	Wembley Stadium, London (A)	England	0–1	BHC	
22 June	Wankdorf Stadion, Bern (A)	Switzerland	0–1	Friendly	
30 June	Hampden Park, Glasgow (H)	Brazil	0–1	Friendly	

1973 British Home Championship – Third Place

Key:

- (H) = Home match
- (A) = Away match
- WCQG8 = World Cup qualifying – Group 8
- BHC = British Home Championship

== See also ==
- 1972–73 Rangers F.C. season
