= Willie Henderson =

Scottish footballer (born 1944)

Personal information
- Full name: William Henderson
- Date of birth: 24 January 1944 (age 82)
- Place of birth: Baillieston, Scotland
- Position: Winger

Senior career*
Years	Team	Apps	(Gls)
1960–1972	Rangers	276	(36)
1972	Durban United	3	(0)
1972–1974	Sheffield Wednesday	48	(5)
1973	Miami Toros	7	(0)
1974–1976	Hong Kong Rangers	47	(5)
1976–1977	Caroline Hill	24	(0)
1977–1978	Brisbane Lions	6	(0)
1978–1979	Airdrieonians	2	(0)
Total		342	(41)

International career
1961–1968	Scotland U23	3	(0)
1962–1971	Scotland	29	(5)
1962–1968	Scottish League XI	6	(2)
1964	SFA trial v SFL	1	(0)
- * Club domestic league appearances and goals

William Henderson (born 24 January 1944) is a Scottish retired footballer. He played most of his career for Rangers, and spent the latter part of his career with Sheffield Wednesday, in Hong Kong with Hong Kong Rangers and with Airdrieonians. He also featured at international level for Scotland.

Henderson made his career debut in 1960 at the age of 16. He was a very pacy right-winger, and as he was only 5 feet 4 inches tall he became known as Wee Willie.

== Playing career ==
=== Club ===
During his time with Rangers he made over 400 appearances and won two Scottish league championships, the Scottish Cup four times and the League Cup twice, including a treble in 1963–64. He was also part of the Rangers team that got to the final of the European Cup Winners' Cup in 1966–67 and was part of the campaign that eventually brought the trophy to Ibrox in the 1971–72 season; however, he was not involved in the 3–2 final victory over FC Dinamo Moscow in Barcelona in May 1972 as he had left Rangers just prior, having fallen out with manager Willie Waddell. Henderson later admitted that missing that game was one of the worst moments of his career. Thus while he sat on a beach in South Africa, his former teammates had their names carved onto the trophy.

Henderson signed for Sheffield Wednesday for the 1972–73 season and made his debut on 12 August 1972 in a 3–0 victory over Fulham. He was a great favourite with the Wednesday fans in the two seasons that he was there even though the club had little success. He made 50 appearances for Wednesday with six as substitute, scoring five goals in his two seasons there. His last appearance for the club was on 27 April 1974, the last match of the 1973–74 season against Bolton Wanderers, a match Wednesday had to win to avoid relegation to Division Three – they won the match 1–0. Henderson left Wednesday at the end of that season and went to play for Hong Kong Rangers. In November 1976, he moved to Caroline Hill. He spent three years in the colony and captained the Hong Kong League XI (a team made up of foreign professionals plying their trade in Hong Kong) before returning to Scotland for a final season with Airdrieonians.

=== International ===
He made his debut for Scotland on 20 October 1962, against Wales in a 3–2 victory for Scotland, in which he scored the winning goal. He also scored in his second game for Scotland in a 5–1 victory over Northern Ireland. He went on to gain a total of 29 caps and five goals. His last game for Scotland was on 21 April 1971, in a 2–0 defeat by Portugal. Henderson remains one of the youngest players to represent Scotland at 18 years and 269 days, and won more caps than his main rival for the position at right wing, the highly regarded Jimmy Johnstone of Celtic. In an interview with the Scotland on Sunday newspaper in April 2006, Henderson admitted that Scotland's failure to qualify for the 1966 and 1970 World Cups was a great disappointment to him as Scotland at that time had one of the best teams in Europe. "I can't believe that we had so many players who were genuine world class yet we didn't reach the best-ever finals of the biggest tournament of them all," said Henderson. He also represented the Scottish League XI.

== Later career ==
Whilst playing for Rangers, Henderson owned and ran a hairdresser's shop in Glasgow. Upon his retirement he opened a pub alongside Alfie Conn, Jr. in Coatbridge. He later operated a hotel in Lanarkshire and worked for Rangers at Ibrox on match days as a hospitality host.

== Personal life ==
Henderson is short sighted and wore contact lenses. People found this amusing as they would often wonder how good a player he would have been had his eyesight been better. Legend has it that late on in an Old Firm encounter he inquired on the sidelines, "How long to go, how long to go?" Jock Stein replied: "Go and ask at the other dugout, you bloody fool – this is the Celtic bench!".

== Career statistics ==
=== International ===
Scotland national team
Year	Apps	Goals
1962	2	2
1963	8	1
1964	2	0
1965	8	1
1966	3	0
1968	1	0
1969	4	1
1971	1	0
Total	29	5

==== International goals ====
Scores and results list Scotland's goal tally first.

#	Date	Venue	Opponent	Score	Result	Competition
1.	20 October 1962	Ninian Park, Cardiff	Wales	3–1	3–2	1962–63 British Home Championship
2.	7 November 1962	Hampden Park, Glasgow	Northern Ireland	4–1	5–1	1962–63 British Home Championship
3.	13 June 1963	Santiago Bernabéu Stadium, Madrid	Spain	5–2	6–2	Friendly
4.	24 November 1965	Hampden Park, Glasgow	Wales	2–1	4–1	1965–66 British Home Championship
5.	17 May 1969	Hampden Park, Glasgow	Cyprus	7–0	8–0	1970 FIFA World Cup qualification
