= George Donaldson (footballer) =

Scottish footballer (born 1954)

Personal information
- Full name: George Innes Donaldson
- Date of birth: 24 November 1954 (age 71)
- Place of birth: Edinburgh, Scotland
- Position: Midfielder

Youth career
- 1970–1972: Rangers

Senior career*
Years	Team	Apps	(Gls)
1972–1974	Rangers	5	(0)
1974–1976	Heart of Midlothian	16	(0)
1976–1977	Dunfermline Athletic	15	(1)
1977–1978	Dunedin City		
1978–1979	Meadowbank Thistle	1	(0)
- Whitehill Welfare
- * Club domestic league appearances and goals

George Innes Donaldson (born 24 November 1954) is a Scottish retired professional footballer who is best known for his time with Rangers and Heart of Midlothian.

== Football career ==
Having already been involved in a pre-season tour of Germany two years earlier, Donaldson made his professional debut for Rangers aged 17 years and 315 days, in a League Cup match against Stenhousemuir at Ibrox Stadium on 4 October 1972. This proved to be his only appearance that season and after only featuring nine times the following season, Donaldson joined Heart of Midlothian on 18 May 1974 on a free transfer. However, Donaldson struggled to make an impact in Gorgie, playing only seventeen leagues and League Cup games before moving on to Dunfermline Athletic in 1976. After one season in Fife, where he scored his only career league goal, he again moved on to the play in the New Zealand National Soccer League for Dunedin City. Donaldson returned to Scotland in 1978, playing for Meadowbank Thistle and latterly Whitehill Welfare.
