= Iain McDonald =

Scottish footballer

Personal information
- Full name: Iain McDonald
- Date of birth: 14 August 1952 (age 74)
- Place of birth: Edinburgh, Scotland
- Position: Left winger

Youth career
- Carrickvale BC

Senior career*
Years	Team	Apps	(Gls)
1969–1973	Rangers	11	(2)
1974–1976	Dundee United	30	(6)
- * Club domestic league appearances and goals

Iain McDonald (born 14 August 1952) is a Scottish former footballer who played as a left winger.

McDonald began his career with Rangers and played in eleven league matches for the Ibrox side before moving to Dundee United in 1974. By 1976, McDonald had featured in thirty league games for The Terrors but injury forced the winger to retire before his 25th birthday.
