= Gerhardt Neef =

German footballer (1946–2010)

Gerry Neef
Personal information
- Full name: Klaus Gerhard Neef
- Date of birth: 30 December 1946
- Place of birth: Hausham, Allied-occupied Germany
- Date of death: 23 February 2010 (aged 63)
- Place of death: Nuremberg, Germany
- Position: Goalkeeper

Youth career
- SV Hamborn

Senior career*
Years	Team	Apps	(Gls)
–1968	VfvB Ruhrort/Laar		
1968–1973	Rangers	33	(0)
1973–1975	1. FC Nürnberg	43	(0)
1975–1979	FC Herzogenaurach		
Total		76	(0)
- * Club domestic league appearances and goals

Gerhard "Gerry" Neef (30 December 1946 – 23 February 2010), often known as Gerhardt Neef, was a German professional footballer who played as a goalkeeper.

== Career ==
Although Neef was taken to Scotland initially by Eddie Turnbull, manager of Aberdeen, he was best known for his spell at Scottish side Rangers, whom he signed for in spring 1968. A former German policeman, he was seen as the answer to the clubs problematic goalkeeping position. The manager Davie White had been struggling to find a replacement to Billy Ritchie since his departure in 1967, using Erik Sørensen and Norrie Martin but not settling on either.

He made his debut on 19 April 1969 in a league match against Greenock Morton, keeping a clean sheet in a 3–0 home win. The following season, he became first choice at the club playing 39 games and winning the 1970 League Cup, after keeping out Celtic F.C. in the final.

The 1970–71 season saw him lose his place to new signing Peter McCloy. His appearances were sporadic thereafter. He was part of the 1971–72 European Cup Winners' Cup squad, but never played. Neef left Rangers to return to West Germany in 1973, having made 48 appearances in total for the club.

== Death ==
Neef died from throat cancer at his home in Nuremberg on 23 February 2010. A one-minute silence was held in respect for Neef before a match at Ibrox Stadium on 28 February 2010.

== Personal life ==
Melanie Neef, Neef's daughter, was an athlete for Great Britain.
