= Tom Forsyth =

Scottish footballer and coach (1949–2020)

Personal information
- Date of birth: 23 January 1949
- Place of birth: Glasgow, Scotland
- Date of death: 14 August 2020 (aged 71)
- Place of death: Strathaven, South Lanarkshire, Scotland
- Height: 1.83 m (6 ft 0 in)
- Position: Centre back

Senior career*
Years	Team	Apps	(Gls)
- Stonehouse Violet
1967–1972	Motherwell	150	(17)
1972–1982	Rangers	218	(2)
Total		368	(19)

International career
1971	Scotland U23	1	(0)
1971–1976	Scottish League XI	2	(0)
1971–1978	Scotland	22	(0)

Managerial career
- 1982–1983: Dunfermline Athletic
- * Club domestic league appearances and goals

Thomas Forsyth (23 January 1949 – 14 August 2020) was a Scottish football player and coach. Forsyth played as a defender for Motherwell, Rangers and Scotland.

== Playing career ==
=== Club ===
Forsyth started his career at junior club Stonehouse Violet, then spent five years at Motherwell, playing over 200 times for the club before being signed by Rangers in October 1972. He scored the winning goal in the 1973 Scottish Cup Final against Old Firm rivals Celtic from six inches.

During his Rangers career, Forsyth made 332 appearances in all competitions and won three league championships, four Scottish Cups and two League Cups; these successes included two domestic trebles, in 1975–76 and 1977–78.

=== International ===
Forsyth played 22 times for Scotland, including at the 1978 World Cup. He captained Scotland once, against Switzerland in 1976.

== Managerial career ==
After his playing retirement, Forsyth was appointed manager of Dunfermline Athletic in 1982, although he relinquished the position within a year. According to his assistant and successor Jim Leishman, Forsyth left his role as Dunfermline manager due to frustration with the club's part-time status: "I think the problem when Tam came to Dunfermline was that he was geared for full-time football at the time, and Dunfermline were part-time. The players would come in and Tam wanted that much on the Tuesday and the Thursday I think he forgot that these guys were part-time." He then accepted a position as assistant-manager to former Rangers team-mate Tommy McLean at Morton in 1983. Forsyth was appointed McLean's assistant at Motherwell then Hearts when McLean moved to these clubs in 1984 and 1994 respectively.

On 14 August 2020, Forsyth died peacefully at home with his family by his side, at the age of 71.

== See also ==
- List of Scotland national football team captains
