= Peter McCloy =

Scottish footballer

Personal information
- Full name: Peter McCloy
- Date of birth: 26 November 1946 (age 79)
- Place of birth: Girvan, Ayrshire, Scotland
- Height: 1.93 m (6 ft 4 in)
- Position: Goalkeeper

Youth career
- Crosshill Thistle
- 1963–1964: Motherwell

Senior career*
Years	Team	Apps	(Gls)
1964–1970	Motherwell	137	(0)
1970–1986	Rangers	351	(0)
1988–1989	Heart of Midlothian	0	(0)
Total		488	(0)

International career
1966–1973	Scottish League XI	4	(0)
1973	Scotland	4	(0)
- * Club domestic league appearances and goals

Peter McCloy (born 26 November 1946) is a Scottish retired football goalkeeper who played for Motherwell and Rangers. He was a member of the team which won the European Cup Winners Cup in 1972, and was Rangers' first-choice goalkeeper for most of his 16-year spell at the club despite competition from players such as Gerhardt Neef, Stewart Kennedy and Jim Stewart.

== Career ==
McCloy joined Motherwell from Crosshill Thistle on his 17th birthday in 1963 and made his senior debut the following year. He stayed at Fir Park for six seasons before joining Rangers in a player exchange deal in 1970, with Bobby Watson and Brian Heron moving in the opposite direction. At Ibrox he was nicknamed "The Girvan Lighthouse", due to his birthplace and the fact he stood 1.93 metres (6 ft 4 in) tall. He played under three different Rangers managers: Willie Waddell, Jock Wallace (in both of his spells as manager), and John Greig. He won multiple honours in his Rangers career: two Scottish League titles, four Scottish League Cups, four Scottish Cups and Rangers' only ever European trophy, the 1971–72 European Cup Winners' Cup. He was one of only five players who featured in every match of the latter campaign, alongside Sandy Jardine, Willie Mathieson, Alex MacDonald and Colin Stein. He made 545 appearances in all competitions for Rangers, and played for Scotland on four occasions.

After retiring as a player in 1986, McCloy went into coaching, firstly during Graeme Souness' spell as Rangers manager, until 1988. He went on to work with a number of clubs and goalkeepers including Andy Goram and Jim Leighton. He was on the bench for Hearts for both legs of their 1988–89 UEFA Cup tie against Bayern Munich.

== Personal life ==
His father Jimmy was also a footballer and a goalkeeper. In retirement, he worked at Turnberry Golf Resort.
