= Graham Fyfe (footballer, born 1951) =

Scottish footballer (1951–2022)

Personal information
- Date of birth: 18 August 1951
- Place of birth: Motherwell, Scotland
- Date of death: April 2022 (aged 70)
- Position: Winger

Senior career*
Years	Team	Apps	(Gls)
1969–1976	Rangers	64	(22)
1976–1977	Hibernian	10	(1)
1977–1979	Dumbarton	59	(11)
1978	→ Adelaide City (loan)	3	(0)
1979–1980	Pittsburgh Spirit (indoor)	31	(37)
1980–1983	Cleveland Force (indoor)	33	(38)
1983–1984	St. Louis Steamers (indoor)	52	(34)
Total		252	(143)
- * Club domestic league appearances and goals

Graham Fyfe (18 August 1951 – 19 April 2022) was a Scottish professional footballer, best known for his time with Rangers, who played as a winger.

== Career ==
Fyfe made his first appearance for Rangers at Ibrox in a league match against Heart of Midlothian on 25 March 1969. He started on the right wing in a 3–2 home win. He went on to make 70 appearances for the club, including the first match against Ajax in the first ever European Super Cup. Fyfe also scored 23 goals which was not bad at all from a midfielder.

He left to join Hibernian after seven seasons in Govan, but his stay in Edinburgh was short lived, as he moved on to Dumbarton the following year. He played at Boghead Park for two seasons before moving to the US to play with Major Indoor Soccer League sides Pittsburgh Spirit and Cleveland Force.

In 1980, Fyfe said that he had to leave Rangers because he had married a girl who was Catholic. However, the media of the period approached other Rangers players who had married Catholic women, including Bobby Russell (who played 370 games for Rangers), and they did not support Fyfe's claims.

Fyfe signed with the St. Louis Steamers in 1983 and spent one season with them.

== Death ==
Fyfe died in April 2022, at the age of 70.

== Honours ==
Rangers

- European Cup Winners' Cup: 1971–72
- Scottish Football League: 1974–75, 1975–76
- Scottish Cup: 1972–73, 1975–76
- Scottish League Cup: 1970–71, 1975–76
