= Quintin Young =

Scottish footballer (1947–2026)

Personal information
- Full name: Quintin Young
- Date of birth: 19 September 1947
- Place of birth: Irvine, Scotland
- Date of death: April 2026 (aged 78)
- Position: Winger

Senior career*
Years	Team	Apps	(Gls)
1969–1971	Ayr United	67	(9)
1971–1973	Coventry City	26	(2)
1973–1976	Rangers	82	(28)
1976–1980	East Fife	67	(9)
Total		242	(48)

International career
1971	Scotland U23	1	(0)
- * Club domestic league appearances and goals

Quintin Young (19 September 1947 – April 2026) was a Scottish footballer who played as a winger for Rangers, among other clubs.

== Career ==
Young started his career at local side Ayr United in 1969 before moving to English team Coventry City two years later. After two seasons in England he moved to Ibrox. He spent three seasons at Rangers and played both legs of the first ever European Super Cup against Ajax Amsterdam. He scored for Rangers in the second leg in Amsterdam, although Rangers still lost the match 3–2 and the tie 6–3 on aggregate.

He left Rangers acrimoniously after a fall-out with then manager Jock Wallace. After requesting a meeting with Wallace because he was unhappy about not being in the first team, an argument ensued and Young was given a free transfer. He joined East Fife in 1976.

== Death ==
Young died in April 2026, aged 78.
