= Willie Mathieson =

Scottish footballer

Personal information
- Date of birth: 20 July 1943 (age 83)
- Place of birth: Cardenden, Scotland
- Position: Left back

Youth career
- St Andrews United
- 1960–1964: Rangers

Senior career*
Years	Team	Apps	(Gls)
1964–1975	Rangers	174	(2)
1975–1976	Arbroath	25	(3)
1976–1977	Raith Rovers	13	(0)
Total		212	(5)

International career
1969	Scottish League XI	1	(0)
- * Club domestic league appearances and goals

Willie Mathieson (born 20 July 1943) is a Scottish former professional footballer who played in the left-back position for Rangers, amongst other clubs. He was included in the Rangers F.C. Hall of Fame on 5 February 2007.

Mathieson trained as an apprentice electrician at Bowhill Colliery, initially joining Rangers part time, then earning less than at the mine when he joined the team full time.

Mathieson spent fifteen seasons at Rangers from 1960 to 1975 and was involved in the club's historic 1972 Cup Winners' Cup winning team. He played in over 300 games for Rangers, including the 1973 Scottish Cup Final winning side. Mathieson represented the Scottish League once, in 1969.

He transferred to Arbroath for the 1975–76 season, playing 25 league games (scoring three times) and then moved on to Raith Rovers for a final season (making 13 appearances). After retirement he joined the Berwick Rangers coaching staff, working under former teammate Dave Smith. Berwick won the Second Division championship, which was their first-ever trophy.

Mathieson is now retired and lives in Auchterarder.
