= Derek Parlane =

Scottish footballer

Personal information
- Full name: Derek James Parlane
- Date of birth: 5 May 1953 (age 73)
- Place of birth: Helensburgh, Scotland
- Height: 6 ft 0 in (1.83 m)
- Position: Striker

Youth career
- Dumbarton Castle Rock
- Queen's Park

Senior career*
Years	Team	Apps	(Gls)
1970–1980	Rangers	202	(80)
1980–1983	Leeds United	50	(10)
1983	→ Bulova (loan)	?	(8)
1983–1985	Manchester City	48	(20)
1985	Swansea City	21	(3)
1985–1986	Racing Jet	2	(0)
1986–1988	Rochdale	42	(10)
1988	Airdrieonians	9	(4)
1988–1990	Macclesfield Town	27	(2)
1990–1991	Curzon Ashton		
Total		411	(137)

International career
1973–1975	Scotland U23	5	(1)
1973–1974	Scottish League XI	2	(0)
1973–1977	Scotland	12	(1)
1977	Scotland U21	1	(0)
- * Club domestic league appearances and goals

Derek James Parlane (born 5 May 1953) is a Scottish former professional footballer who played as a striker for Rangers from 1970 until 1980, and also played in England with clubs including Leeds United and Manchester City.

== Career ==
=== Rangers and Leeds United ===
Raised in the small village of Rhu, Parlane joined Rangers as a teenager, from Queens Park following in the footsteps of his father Jimmy who had a spell with the club in the 1940s. He made 300 appearances winning three Scottish League championships, three Scottish Cups, three Scottish League Cups and the 1971–72 European Cup Winners' Cup; he was capped by Scotland 12 times (with one Under-21 cap). Furthermore, Parlane was inducted into the Rangers Hall of Fame in 2010.

He moved to Leeds United in March 1980 for a fee of £160,000. He scored 10 goals in 53 appearances for Leeds before going to Hong Kong on loan to Bulova.

=== Manchester City and later career ===
Aged 30, on 14 July 1983, new Manchester City manager Billy McNeill brought Parlane to Maine Road on a free transfer He linked up with another newcomer, fellow Scot Jim Tolmie, and both made their debut for the Blues on Saturday 27 August 1983 in a 2-0 win against Crystal Palace at Selhurst Park in the Second Division. Parlane and May each scored one which set a precedent for the rest of the season. In all, Parlane scored 20 goals in 48 appearances for City.

For 1984–85 season did City signed David Phillips from Coventry City and Tony Cunningham from Newcastle United to bolster their attack. Parlane got injured in September 1984 and was sold to Swansea City in January 1985.

He spent the 1985–86 season in Belgium with Racing Jet, before returning to play two seasons with Rochdale from 1986 to 1988, playing 42 games and scoring 10 times. His last professional club was Airdrie in the 1987–88 season, he scored 4 goals in 9 games, before signing for then non-league outfit Macclesfield Town in England.
