= Alex MacDonald (footballer, born 1948) =

Scottish footballer and manager

Personal information
- Full name: Alexander MacDonald
- Date of birth: 17 March 1948 (age 78)
- Place of birth: Glasgow, Scotland
- Position: Midfielder

Youth career
- Luncarty
- Glasgow United

Senior career*
Years	Team	Apps	(Gls)
1966–1968	St Johnstone	65	(17)
1968–1980	Rangers	336	(51)
1980–1985	Hearts	122	(10)
Total		523	(78)

International career
1976	Scottish Football League XI	1	(0)
1976	Scotland	1	(0)

Managerial career
- 1981–1990: Hearts
- 1991–1999: Airdrieonians
- * Club domestic league appearances and goals

Alexander MacDonald (born 17 March 1948 in Glasgow) is a Scottish former professional football player and manager. MacDonald played for St Johnstone, Rangers and Hearts. He also played in one full international match for Scotland, in 1976. Towards the end of his playing career, MacDonald became player/manager of Hearts. He led the team as they won promotion in 1983, then narrowly missed out on winning the Scottish league championship in 1986. MacDonald then managed Airdrieonians for most of the 1990s, leading the team to Scottish Cup finals in 1992 and 1995.

== Playing career ==
=== Club career ===
MacDonald started his career with St Johnstone but was snapped up by Rangers in November 1968 for £65,000. He quickly became a fans favourite at Ibrox as he demonstrated his passion for the blue jersey. He was instrumental in Rangers 1972 Cup Winners' Cup triumph, scoring against Rennes in the First Round. During his time at Rangers he played 503 games and scored 94 times and won 3 League Championship, 4 Scottish Cup and 4 League Cup medals. MacDonald joined Hearts for £30,000 in 1980.

=== International career ===
MacDonald was capped once by Scotland, against Switzerland in 1976.

== Managerial career ==
MacDonald became player/manager at Tynecastle in 1981. He took Hearts to within seven minutes of winning the Scottish Premier League title in 1985–86. One week later his team lost the Scottish Cup Final 3–0 to Aberdeen. He became joint manager alongside Sandy Jardine in 1986, although this was a short lived arrangement. Hearts chairman Wallace Mercer sacked MacDonald in the summer of 1990.

MacDonald later found success with Airdrieonians. He took over the newly promoted team from Jimmy Bone in May 1991, and guided them to two Scottish Cup finals and into Europe. In the 1992–93 season he led them into the European Cup Winners Cup as a result of being runners-up to Rangers in the Scottish Cup final during the previous season. The club's last appearance in the final was in 1994–95, when they lost 1–0 to Tommy Burns' Celtic. League success was harder to come by, however, and the team were relegated to the First Division in 1993. Unable to provide a return to top-league football, he was sacked by Airdrie on 13 March 1999 and has chosen not to work in management since.

== Honours ==
=== Player ===
Rangers

- Scottish League Cup: 1970-71
- European Cup Winners' Cup: 1971-72

Won 3 League Championships, 4 Scottish Cups, and 4 League Cups during 503 appearances and 94 goals for Rangers Football Club.

=== Manager ===
Airdrieonians

- Scottish Challenge Cup: 1994–95

Heart of Midlothian

- Scottish First Division promoted: 1982–83
- Tennents' Sixes: 1985
