= Alfie Conn Jr. =

Scottish footballer

Alfie Conn
Personal information
- Full name: Alfie James Conn
- Date of birth: 5 April 1952 (age 74)
- Place of birth: Kirkcaldy, Scotland
- Height: 1.78 m (5 ft 10 in)
- Position: Midfielder

Senior career*
Years	Team	Apps	(Gls)
1968–1974	Rangers	93	(23)
1974–1977	Tottenham Hotspur	38	(6)
1977–1979	Celtic	32	(7)
1979	Pittsburgh Spirit	0	(0)
1979	San Jose Earthquakes	?	(?)
1979–1980	Hartford Hellions	21	(15)
1980	Hearts	2	(0)
1980	Blackpool	?	(?)
1980	Motherwell	17	(3)
Total		233	(57)

International career
1975	Scotland	2	(0)
- * Club domestic league appearances and goals

Alfie James Conn (born 5 April 1952) is a Scottish former professional footballer, who was the first post-World War II player to play for both Old Firm rivals Rangers and Celtic.

== Background ==
Conn is the son of the footballer Alfie Conn Sr., who was one of the 'Terrible Trio' of Heart of Midlothian in the 1950s.

== Career ==
=== Rangers ===
Conn made his senior debut for Rangers against Dundalk in the Fairs Cup tournament in November 1968. He was part of the Rangers team which lifted the European Cup Winners' Cup in 1972 and also helped the Ibrox team win the Scottish Cup in 1973, scoring their second goal in a 3–2 final victory over Celtic at Hampden Park.

=== Tottenham Hotspur ===
He played for Tottenham Hotspur football club from 1974 to 1977. He was the last player to be signed by their manager Bill Nicholson. Despite playing only 35 games and scoring six goals, he was a huge fan favourite, dubbed the "King of White Hart Lane" after scoring a hat-trick on his debut in a 5–2 win at Newcastle. In the final game of the 1974–75 season at White Hart Lane, Tottenham Hotspur had to beat Leeds United to prevent relegation from the First Division. Conn scored a goal, set up two others and even sat on the ball in a 4–2 victory.

When at Spurs he made two appearances for the Scotland national football team at the end of the season in 1975.

=== Celtic ===
In 1977 Conn won a second Scottish Cup, this time with Celtic, when he was part of the side that defeated Rangers 1–0 in the final.

=== Heart of Midlothian ===
Conn Jr. followed in his father's footsteps by signing for the Tynecastle club in 1980, following a short spell playing indoor football in the United States with Pittsburgh Spirit.

=== Blackpool and Motherwell ===
Conn wound down his career with short spells at Blackpool and Motherwell before retiring in 1983.

== Legacy ==
On 5 February 2007 Conn was included in the Rangers F.C. Hall of Fame.

== See also ==
- Played for Celtic and Rangers
