= 2023 Scottish League Cup final (February) =

Football games

2023 Scottish League Cup Final (February)
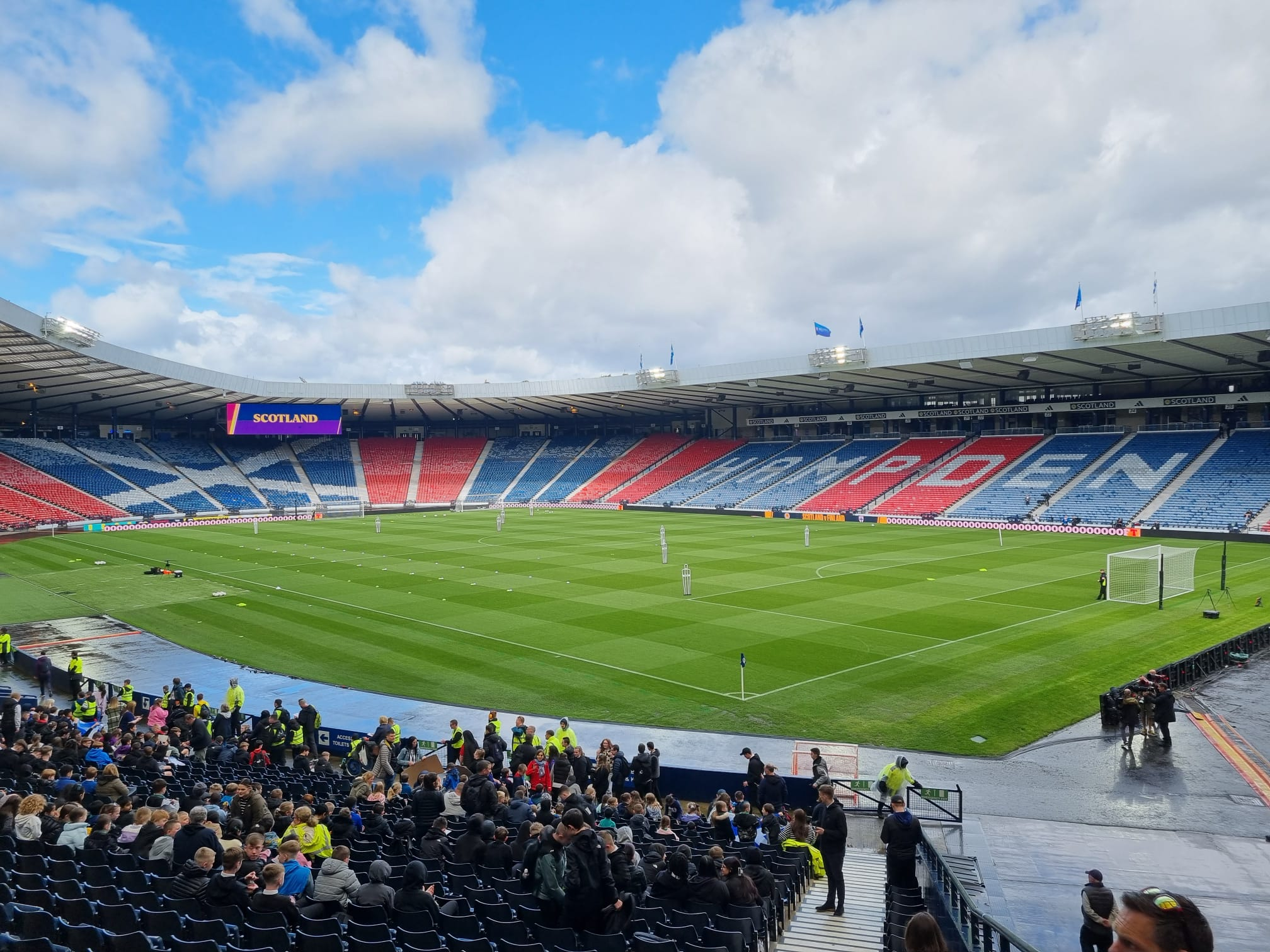
- Hampden Park was the venue for the match
- Event: 2022–23 Scottish League Cup
Rangers	Celtic
1	2
- Date: 26 February 2023
- Venue: Hampden Park, Glasgow
- Referee: Nick Walsh
- Attendance: 49,529

The 2022–23 Scottish League Cup final was an association football match that took place at Hampden Park, Glasgow on 26 February 2023. It was the final match of the 2022–23 Scottish League Cup, the 77th season of the Scottish League Cup (known as the Viaplay Cup for sponsorship reasons), a competition for the 42 teams in the Scottish Professional Football League (SPFL). The Old Firm clubs, Rangers and Celtic, contested the final between each other for a 16th time, with Celtic having won the most recent meeting in 2019. Celtic were the cup holders, having defeated Hibernian 2–1 in the December 2021 final. Rangers last won the competition in 2011.

== Route to the final ==
As both clubs participated in European competitions, they both received a bye through the 2022–23 Scottish League Cup group stage.

=== Rangers ===
Round	Opposition	Score
Second round	Queen of the South	3–1 (h)
Quarter-final	Dundee	1–0 (h)
Semi-final	Aberdeen	2–1 (a.e.t.) (n)

=== Celtic ===
Round	Opposition	Score
Second round	Ross County	4–1 (a)
Quarter-final	Motherwell	4–0 (a)
Semi-final	Kilmarnock	2–0 (n)

== Match ==
=== Details ===
26 February 2023
15:00 GMT

Rangers	1–2	Celtic
Morelos 64'	Report	Furuhashi 44', 56'

Hampden Park, Glasgow
Attendance: 49,529
Referee: Nick Walsh

Rangers	Celtic

GK	1	(Scotland) Allan McGregor
RB	2	(England) James Tavernier (c)
CB	6	(England) Connor Goldson
CB	26	(England) Ben Davies
LB	31	(Croatia) Borna Barišić	(yellow card) 90'
CM	71	(United States) Malik Tillman		(substituted off) 65'
CM	4	(England) John Lundstram	(yellow card) 50'	(substituted off) 65'
CM	18	(Finland) Glen Kamara	(yellow card) 58'	(substituted off) 65'
RW	30	(Zambia) Fashion Sakala		(substituted off) 84'
CF	20	(Colombia) Alfredo Morelos		(substituted off) 76'
LW	14	(England) Ryan Kent	(yellow card) 90'
Substitutes:
GK	33	(Scotland) Jon McLaughlin
MF	7	(Romania) Ianis Hagi
MF	8	(Scotland) Ryan Jack		(substituted on) 65'
FW	9	(Croatia) Antonio Čolak	(yellow card) 90+1'	(substituted on) 76'
MF	13	(England) Todd Cantwell	(yellow card) 90+4'	(substituted on) 65'
FW	23	(Scotland) Scott Wright		(substituted on) 84'
MF	37	(Canada) Scott Arfield
MF	43	(Belgium) Nicolas Raskin		(substituted on) 65'
DF	44	(Scotland) Adam Devine
Manager:
(England) Michael Beale

GK	1	(England) Joe Hart
RB	2	(Canada) Alistair Johnston	(yellow card) 90+1'
CB	20	(United States) Cameron Carter-Vickers
CB	4	(Sweden) Carl Starfelt
LB	3	(Scotland) Greg Taylor	(yellow card) 70'
CM	13	(Australia) Aaron Mooy		(substituted off) 65'
CM	42	(Scotland) Callum McGregor (c)
CM	41	(Japan) Reo Hatate		(substituted off) 76'
RW	17	(Portugal) Jota		(substituted off) 64'
CF	8	(Japan) Kyogo Furuhashi		(substituted off) 76'
LW	38	(Japan) Daizen Maeda		(substituted off) 84'
Substitutes:
GK	29	(Scotland) Scott Bain
FW	9	(Montenegro) Sead Hakšabanović		(substituted on) 84'
FW	11	(Israel) Liel Abada	(yellow card) 83'	(substituted on) 64'
MF	14	(Scotland) David Turnbull
DF	18	(Japan) Yuki Kobayashi
FW	19	(South Korea) Oh Hyeon-gyu	(yellow card) 79'	(substituted on) 76'
MF	24	(Japan) Tomoki Iwata		(substituted on) 76'
MF	33	(Denmark) Matt O'Riley		(substituted on) 65'
DF	56	(Scotland) Anthony Ralston
Manager:
(Australia) Ange Postecoglou

Man of the Match:
Kyogo Furuhashi (Celtic)

Assistant referees:
Frank Connor
David Roome
Fourth official:
Kevin Clancy
Video assistant referee:
John Beaton
Graeme Stewart (assistant)

Match rules

- 90 minutes
- 30 minutes of extra time if necessary
- Penalty shoot-out if scores still level
- Nine named substitutes
- Maximum of five substitutions, with a sixth allowed in extra time (Note: Each team was given only three opportunities to make substitutions, with a fourth opportunity in extra time, excluding substitutions made at half-time, before the start of extra time and at half-time in extra time.)

== See also ==
- Scottish League Cup Finals played between same clubs: 1957, 1964, 1965, 1966, 1970, 1975, 1978, 1982, 1984 (March), 1986, 1990, 2003, 2009, 2011, 2019
