= Old Firm =

Prominent rivalry in Scottish football

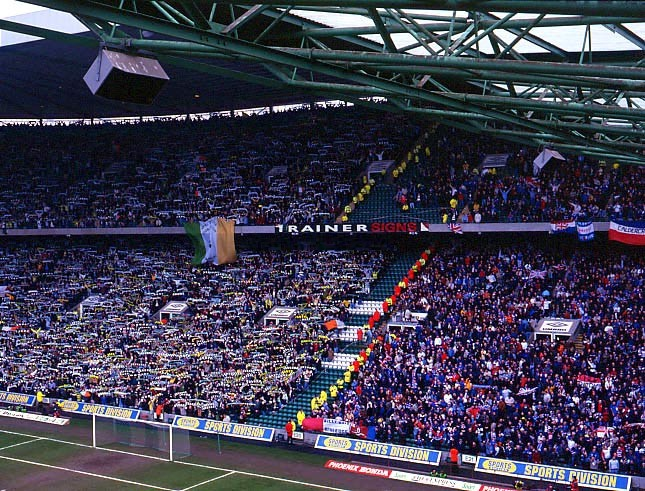
- Celtic and Rangers fans, separated by police, at Celtic Park
- Other names: Glasgow derby
- Location: Glasgow, Scotland
- Teams: Celtic; Rangers
- First meeting: 28 May 1888; Friendly; Celtic 5–2 Rangers
- Latest meeting: 20 September 2026; Scottish Premiership; Celtic 0–1 Rangers
- Next meeting: 3 January 2027; Scottish Premiership; Rangers v Celtic

Statistics
- Total meetings: 454
- Most wins: Rangers (174)
- All-time series: Celtic: 172; Drawn: 108; Rangers: 174
- Largest victory: Celtic 7–1 Rangers; Scottish League Cup (19 October 1957)
- Location of the two teams' stadiums in Glasgow, and Hampden Park, where cup semi-final and final meetings between the two are normally played

Celtic	Rangers

The Old Firm is a collective term for the Scottish football clubs Celtic and Rangers, which are both based in Glasgow. The two clubs are the most successful and popular in Scotland, and the rivalry between them has become deeply embedded in Scottish culture. It has reflected and contributed to political, social and religious division and sectarianism in Scotland. As a result, matches between them have had an enduring appeal around the world.

The two clubs are among the most decorated globally, having won a combined 111 Scottish League championships (56 by Celtic and 55 by Rangers), 77 Scottish Cups (43 by Celtic and 34 by Rangers), and 50 Scottish League Cups (28 by Rangers and 22 by Celtic). Interruptions to their ascendancy have occurred rarely, mainly in the two decades after the Second World War from 1946 to 1965 when five other clubs won the league, and in the first half of the 1980s with the challenge of the New Firm of Aberdeen and Dundee United. Since the 1985–86 season, one half of the Old Firm has won the Scottish League every season, and in all but one of seventeen seasons between 1995–96 and 2011–12, both clubs finished in the top two places.

In the early 2010s, Rangers endured financial difficulties, and its holding company was liquidated in 2012. Subsequently, the club had to apply for entry to the bottom (fourth) tier of the Scottish league. As a result of the liquidation, many Celtic supporters maintain that the current Rangers is distinct from the pre-2012 club, and the rivalry no longer exists under the Old Firm identity. Instead, they (and often Celtic themselves) use the more generic term Glasgow derby to refer to the rivalry. While Rangers climbed back through the divisions, Celtic were champions in each of the next nine campaigns; Rangers won the title in 2020–21 to prevent a tenth for Celtic, which would have beaten a record set by Celtic in the 1960s and 1970s and matched by Rangers in the 1980s and 1990s.

Celtic and Rangers have played each other 454 times in major competitions; Rangers have won 174 matches, Celtic 172, and 108 ended in a draw.

The clubs have large fan bases around Glasgow and Scotland and have supporters clubs in many towns throughout Scotland and in cities around the world. In 2005 the presence of Rangers and Celtic was estimated to be worth £120 million to the Scottish economy each year.

== Origin of 'Old Firm' ==
The origin of the term is unclear but may derive from the two clubs' initial match in which the commentators referred to the teams as "like two old, firm friends", or alternatively may stem from a satirical cartoon published in 'The Scottish Referee' sports newspaper prior to the 1904 Scottish Cup final between the sides, depicting an elderly man with a sandwich board reading "Patronise The Old Firm: Rangers, Celtic Ltd", highlighting the mutual commercial benefits of their meetings. The name may also be a reference to these two teams being among the original eleven members of the Scottish Football League formed in 1890 (although others from that group, such as Heart of Midlothian and St Mirren, also continue to play at the highest level to this day).

At the turn of the 21st century, the two clubs jointly registered the 'Old Firm' term at the Intellectual Property Office; it was confirmed this was still being renewed as a trademark in 2021.

== Rivalry and sectarianism ==
"When I was growing up, I went to a Catholic school, and there wasn't one Rangers fan in the entire school," said Neil McGarvey, 43, who is involved in the operation of Kerrydale Street, a popular Celtic fan Web site. "It's much more mixed now – my boy goes to a Catholic school, and there are maybe 5 percent Rangers fans now."

— The New York Times, 2012

The competition between the two clubs had roots in more than just a simple sporting rivalry. It has as much to do with Northern Ireland as Scotland and this can be seen in the flags, cultural symbols, and emblems of both clubs. It was infused with a series of complex disputes, sometimes centred on religion (Protestant and Catholic), Northern Ireland-related politics (Loyalist and Republican), national identity (British or Irish Scots), and social ideology (conservatism and socialism).

Another primary contributor to the intensity of the rivalry in the west of Scotland was that Rangers supporters are historically native Scots and Ulster Scots, and Celtic supporters are historically Irish-Scots. Although the confrontation between the two sets of supporters was often labelled as 'Sectarianism', 'Native-Immigrant tension' was an equally accurate catalyst for hostility between the two teams' supports in Scotland. Rangers' traditional support was largely from the Protestant community, and for decades the club had an unwritten rule whereby they would not knowingly sign a player of the Catholic faith. The policy was decried by Graeme Souness when he became manager, and he brought ex-Celtic forward Mo Johnston to the club in a very public move away from the practice, which no longer continues. Celtic's support was largely from those of Irish Roman Catholic backgrounds and while the club practiced no exclusion of Protestants and signed many of them to play for the team, there was a pro-Catholic mindset among some of the employees. One effect is that Scottish flags are rarer than might be expected amongst both sets of supporters; Celtic fans are more likely to wave the Irish tricolour while Rangers fans tend to wave the Union Jack.

Celtic were founded in 1887 on the promise that the club would deliver much-needed money and resources to a poverty-stricken Irish Catholic population in East Glasgow (although records indicated little of this income reached those causes) and quickly drew large crowds at their matches, becoming a symbol for that section of the local population which were marginalised in other areas of society and had previously shown little interest in the emerging sport. Rangers had been founded 15 years earlier in 1872 and had no particular religious leanings in their early decades, indeed they were described by the press as friends of Celtic in match reports at the turn of the 20th century. In that era Rangers had won three successive championships and expanded their stadium at great expense, only for one of the new wooden stands to collapse during a Scotland v England fixture in April 1902, killing 25 and injuring hundreds of others. The disaster forced the club to rebuild Ibrox for a second time and financed this by selling off their best players, with Celtic, in particular, taking advantage of the weakness to win six successive titles between 1905 and 1910 before Rangers returned to their previous strength. The sporting side of the rivalry was now established, with their meetings providing considerable financial benefit as seen in the Scottish Cup finals of 1904 (which appears to be the origin of the 'Old Firm' term) and 1909 when they drew twice and a further replay was ordered, with supporters of both teams deciding to riot on the assumption the results were being fixed to make more money – amid multiple injuries and considerable damage to Hampden Park, the trophy was withheld.

The political aspect of the feud also developed in that period, with perhaps the most significant development occurring in 1912 when Belfast shipbuilders Harland and Wolff (a company which already had anti-Catholic hiring practices) set up a new yard in Glasgow due to instability in Ireland. Hundreds of Ulster Protestant workers, many of Scottish descent, also made the move, and they adopted Rangers – the closest large club to the Govan yard – as their new team. Other events such as World War I and the Easter Rising contributed to the club being adopted as a symbol of the Scottish establishment and of British Unionism in the face of Irish Catholic rebellion personified by the success of Celtic and from that time on, many across Scotland and Northern Ireland (and the diaspora of those communities in England, North America and elsewhere) became supporters of Rangers or Celtic over and above their local teams according to their own political and religious leanings, including polarised attitudes towards 'The Troubles'.

Nevertheless, this dividing line seems to be blurred in 21st century Glasgow: religious adherence, in general, is falling, marriages between Protestants and Catholics have never been higher and the old certainties – the Rangers supporter voting Conservative and the Celtic supporter voting Labour – are no longer in evidence. In 2005 both Celtic and Rangers joined a project to tackle bigotry and sectarianism in sport, but there was little change in the behaviour and subsequent prosecution of the fans.

The majority of Rangers and Celtic supporters do not get involved in sectarianism, but serious incidents do occur with a tendency for the actions of a minority to dominate the headlines. The Old Firm rivalry fuelled many assaults on derby days, and some deaths in the past have been directly related to the aftermath of Old Firm matches. An activist group that monitors sectarian activity in Glasgow has reported that on Old Firm weekends, violent attacks increase ninefold over normal levels. An increase in domestic abuse can also be attributed to Old Firm fixtures.

A freedom of information request found that Strathclyde Police incurred costs of £2.4 million for the seven derbies played during the 2010–11 season, with the clubs only contributing £0.3 million towards that. Other high-profile games involving Rangers and Celtic incurred much lower costs. The reason for the disparity in costs and the contribution made is that Strathclyde Police had to increase its activity elsewhere in Glasgow and beyond, while the clubs were only responsible for costs incurred in the vicinity of their stadium. In a period between April 2016 and December 2017, when nine matches were contested (three each at the club's stadiums and three at Hampden), more than £550,000 was spent by Celtic, Rangers, the SFA and the SPFL on policing inside the stadium alone. Rangers paid more than Celtic despite having a smaller capacity and a plan for the away support at Ibrox which required less of a 'human barricade' of officers to separate the rival supporters than was necessary at Celtic Park.

In 2015, former Rangers player Brian Laudrup said that the Old Firm topped all of the rivalries he had played in, which included the Milan derby and the Fiorentina-Juventus meetings in Italy; ex-Celtic striker Henrik Larsson, who experienced El Clásico in Spain and De Klassieker in the Netherlands, has made similar comments. Jim Bett, who had already played in Iceland prior to joining Rangers in the 1980s and thereafter moved to Belgium, stated that he declined an opportunity to return to the Ibrox club due to the sectarianism associated with life as a footballer in the west of Scotland, in contrast to his positive experiences living abroad.

=== Disorder within stadiums ===
Hundreds of opposing fans fought an on-pitch battle in the aftermath of Celtic's 1–0 victory in the 1980 Scottish Cup final at Hampden, fuelled by alcohol and armed with the cans and bottles. Despite previous instances of similar behaviour – less widespread and more speedily quelled, but still resulting in dozens of arrests – at the end of the 1965 Scottish League Cup final, 1969 Scottish Cup final and 1977 Scottish Cup final between the same teams at the same venue, a senior police officer on duty at the time estimated the number of his colleagues inside the stadium in 1980 was barely into double figures, with almost all the estimated 400 police outside Hampden dealing with expected disorder issues, and perimeter fencing assumed sufficient to keep the fans off the pitch. This remains one of the worst invasions onto a football pitch ever reported, and was instrumental in alcohol being banned from all football grounds in Scotland, a situation which was still in place 40 years on.

In January 1994, Rangers chairman David Murray announced that Celtic fans had been banned from Ibrox due to repeated instances of vandalism to the stadium which Celtic refused to take financial responsibility for. Only one fixture, which ended 1–1, was played before the ban was rescinded (the Scottish Football League passed a resolution preventing clubs from taking that action in future).

There was serious fan disorder during an Old Firm match played on a Sunday evening in May 1999 at Celtic Park, with the usual tensions heightened by the fact that Rangers could clinch the league title with victory (and it became clear that they would do so from the early stages of the match). Several objects were thrown by Celtic fans, one of which struck referee Hugh Dallas forcing the game to be stopped while he received medical treatment. With many of those in attendance having spent a full weekend drinking alcohol prior to the event, at least four Celtic fans invaded the field of play to confront Dallas during the game, and more missiles were thrown at players on the pitch after the game. Since the events of that day, Old Firm league matches have normally been played in the early afternoon and the possibility of an Old Firm title decider has been deliberately avoided.

Some supporters of both clubs, when interviewed, have conceded that they do not particularly enjoy the intense atmosphere of Old Firm matches.

=== Incidents involving players ===
Over the hundreds of matches played between the rivals, players and staff have been involved in many incidents beyond the usual bad tackles and red cards commonly associated with derby matches around the world; in the modern age of video footage, such incidents are more frequently observed, reviewed and scrutinised. In 1987, four players were charged by the police with breach of the peace for their conduct during a match at Ibrox and had to appear at court, with two (Chris Woods and Terry Butcher) convicted and fined. While warming up on the touchline at Celtic Park in January 1998, Rangers' Paul Gascoigne was caught on television reacting to verbal abuse from the stands by briefly miming the playing of a flute (representing "The Sash" and the typical repertoire of songs on an Orange walk, considered an offensive gesture by Celtic's many supporters of an Irish Catholic background). Gascoigne, who had pleaded his ignorance of the situation after he made the same gesture in a friendly just after joining Rangers in 1995 and had been sent off on his last visit to Celtic six weeks earlier, was fined for the provocative act and left the club later that year. He has stated that he later received threats via telephone calls from persons purporting to be members of the IRA over his behaviour.

In 2000, after being sent off during an Old Firm match, Rangers midfielder Barry Ferguson was involved in a violent brawl with Celtic fans at a hotel later in the same evening; a year later, Ferguson (by now club captain) was sitting in the stand when he appeared to throw ice packs towards the Celtic dugout after Rangers conceded a late goal, however the referee missed the incident and no action was taken. In that same match, a Celtic supporter was photographed making an 'aeroplane' gesture towards American Rangers player Claudio Reyna a few weeks after the September 11 attacks. A 2004 match at Ibrox which "descended into even more mayhem and madness than usual" led to a police enquiry over the conduct of the players and staff.

In February 2006, Celtic goalkeeper Artur Boruc was cautioned by the police for gestures he made to Rangers supporters during a match at Ibrox; six months later, it was clarified that this was for "Conduct which appears to incite disorder" rather than simply making the sign of the cross as he entered his area, as some had thought. He also blessed himself in the fixture in December of that year, annoying Rangers fans who saw it as a provocative act, although the police stated that no offence had been committed. Boruc, who became known as the 'Holy Goalie' for his overt displays of his Catholic faith, escaped personal punishment in 2008 for displaying a t-shirt with the slogan "God bless the Pope" and an image of fellow Pole Pope John Paul II after an Old Firm win at Parkhead in April 2008, although Celtic faced scrutiny from FIFA as it was an unauthorised garment under their regulations on slogans. He was fined £500 and warned for (non-religious) gestures made towards Rangers fans in a defeat at the same venue in September of the same year. Prior to an international match between Northern Ireland and Poland in 2009, graffiti of a threatening nature mentioning Boruc appeared on walls in a Rangers-supporting area of Belfast.

In March 2011, an angry exchange took place on the touchline at Celtic Park between Celtic manager Neil Lennon and Rangers assistant coach Ally McCoist, requiring police officers to separate them, at the end of a match in which three players had also been dismissed; again captured on live television footage, the incident resulted in both men being banned from the dugout for misconduct. A 'crisis meeting' was convened involving the clubs, the Scottish Government and Strathclyde Police some days later regarding the trend of violence among supporters away from the pitch increasing on Old Firm matchdays and concerns that incidents during the matches was a factor. The incident occurred during the tense environment of a season where seven Old Firm matches took place (including a League Cup final and a fight for the title eventually won by Rangers by one point).

=== Visitor allocation, crushing incident ===
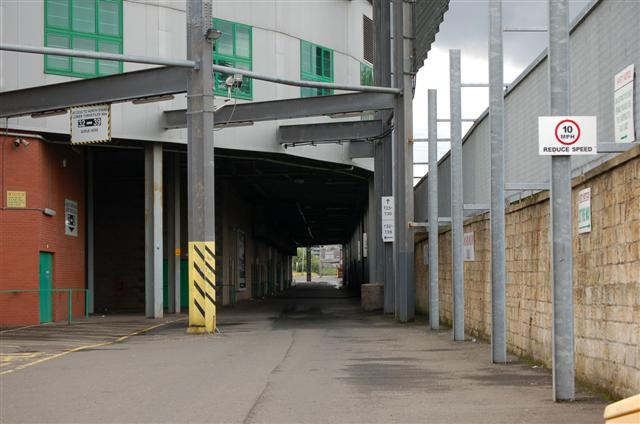
The tunnel behind the North Stand at Celtic Park, through which supporters were directed from either end of the stadium in the 2018 incident

During the 2018 close season, Rangers announced that they would be cutting the ticket allocation for Celtic fans at Ibrox from around 7,000 (the entire Broomloan Stand) to 800, situated in a corner where smaller travelling supports were usually accommodated, following a fan survey backing the proposal as well as an upturn in season ticket sales. In response, Celtic indicated they would do likewise, bringing to an end a long tradition of both clubs offering a generous proportion of their stadium to their rivals. The development was criticised by former players as diluting the famous atmosphere of the fixtures, although others praised the extra income the change would likely generate. In the first fixture at Celtic Park under the new arrangements, a combination of a larger home support, the need to retain segregation for the smaller away support and general unfamiliarity with the new arrangements led to an incident of crushing in the enclosed walkway behind the North Stand before kick off as supporters were directed to use the route to reach both of the end stands; several people scaled a high perimeter wall and fence to escape, and medical attention was required for five fans. Those involved expressed their anger afterwards regarding the arrangements and policing, with Celtic issuing an official apology.

Towards the end of the 2022–23 season, a dispute between the clubs over ticketing and supporter safety issues led to there being no away fans at all for the last two league fixtures, which was also the case throughout 2023–24 and, despite an agreement being reached in March 2024 to end the stalemate and allow a 5% (~2,500) visiting allocation at each stadium, continued into 2024–25 (the prolongation was blamed by Celtic on the unpredictability of renovations at Ibrox which caused some matches to be played at Hampden and others with reduced capacity, although it was highly likely the work would have been finished by the relevant date of 2 January 2025).

=== Legislation ===
From 1 March 2012, the police were given more powers to act against Sectarian acts at football matches through the new Offensive Behaviour at Football and Threatening Communications (Scotland) Act 2012. The law was designed specifically to target the Old Firm rivalry by reducing the religious hatred between the two opposing sides. The Act created two new offences, one covering behaviour in and around football matches and the other related to posts sent by either electronic or postal methods. People convicted under the act could face up to five years imprisonment, a much higher sentence than was previously in place. It was hoped it would make it much easier to prosecute this misbehaviour, which had proved difficult in the past.

In March 2013 a protest by a number of Celtic fans took place to protest against the new laws and the subsequent match bans that a number of fans had received for breaking the Act. The protesters, known as the "Green Brigade", had marched without police authority and the event was therefore cracked down on by local authorities resulting in thirteen arrests. The protestors claim that the police instigated the trouble that occurred at this march. Following the march, media coverage reported that the fans were growing further apart from the police than ever before. They claimed that the trust the fans hold with the police to work in cooperation with them is falling dramatically. The march that took place resulted in a number of complaints from both Celtic and Rangers fan groups that they were harassed by the police.

Labour MSP James Kelly introduced the Offensive Behaviour at Football and Threatening Communications (Repeal) (Scotland) Bill in June 2017. Kelly had described the 2012 legislation as having "completely failed to tackle sectarianism" and as "illiberal" which "unfairly targets football fans", and was "condemned by legal experts, human rights organisations and equality groups". Professor T. M. Devine previously spoke of the Football Act as "the most illiberal and counterproductive act passed by our young Parliament to date" and a "stain on the reputation of the Scottish legal system for fair dealing". Much was made of when a Sheriff described the law as "mince".

After passing through the parliamentary process in early 2018, on 19 April the bill received royal assent, repealing the 2012 Act.

=== Joint sponsorship ===
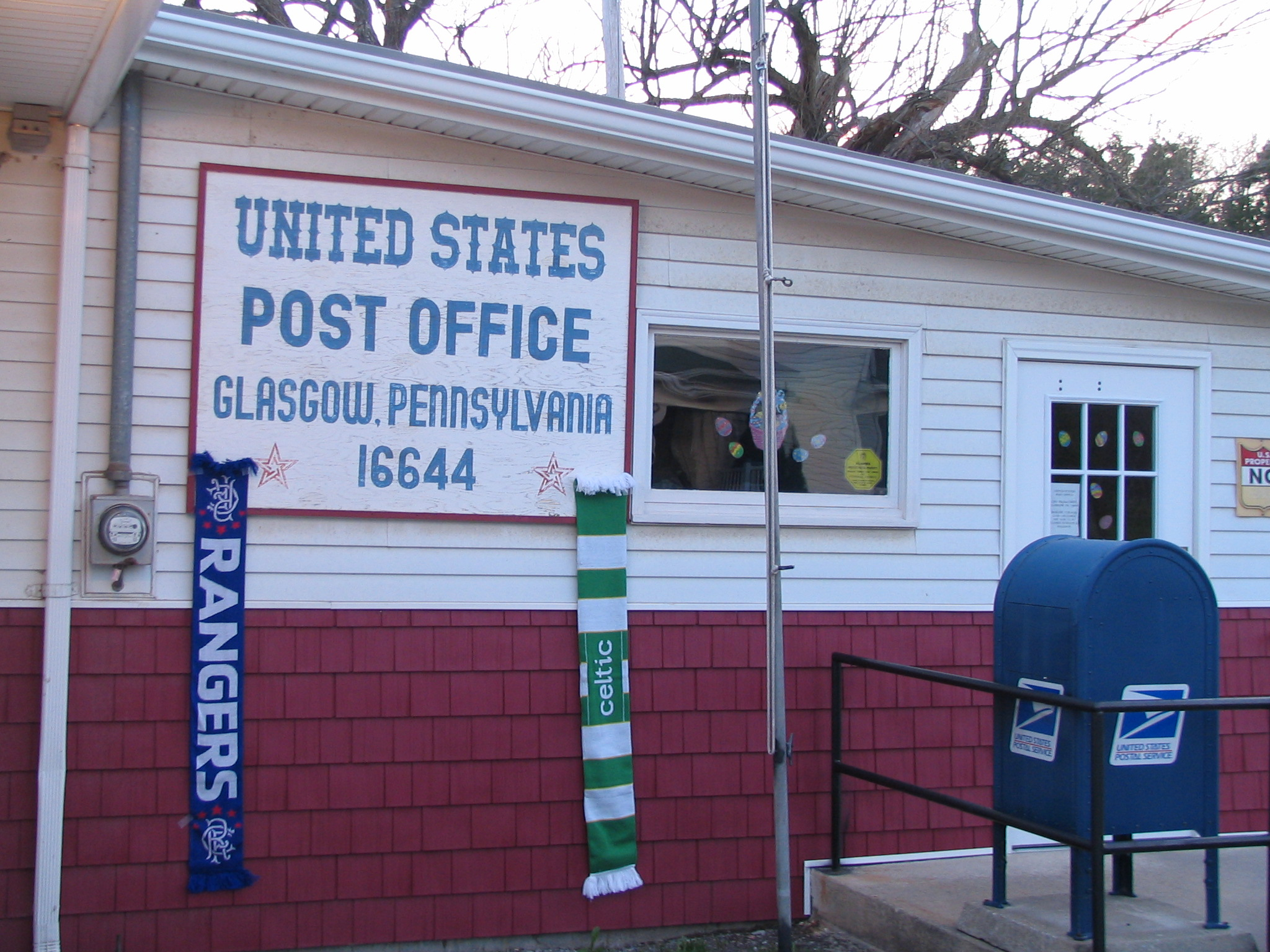
The Reade Township, Pennsylvania post office in the Glasgow village of the township, with two scarves of Celtic and Rangers hanging off the sign

Glasgow-based brewers Tennent's were the primary commercial sponsor of both teams for several years; any local business that only sponsored one would likely lose half its customers. Previously, glazing company CR Smith (who later had a deal with Celtic alone), communications firm NTL and English brewers Carling had also sponsored both clubs.

== Events post-2012 ==
In 2012, Rangers suffered a financial collapse leading to the liquidation of the club. The sporting assets were acquired by a new company which allowed them to re-apply to join the Scottish football league system in the lowest division. As a result, for the first time in 120 years, no fixtures were played between Rangers and Celtic.

The status of the Old Firm was also challenged, following the logic that since Rangers were liquidated during the events of 2012, the rivalry also expired and any matches played since that point would be between Celtic and a 'new Rangers', albeit playing at the same stadium, in the same colours, with the same supporters and some of the same players as before. Adherents of this view often derogatorily refer to the club as 'Sevco' (the original name of the post-2012 holding company), and Rangers supporters as 'zombies' or 'the undead'. This difference of opinion became a new factor in the rivalry.

Some Celtic supporters were particularly vociferous in their assertions, to the extent of a group paying for a full-page newspaper advertisement in January 2015 announcing that their club would soon play its first fixture against the new Rangers.

It is regarded as a continuation of the same club by the SPFL chief executive Neil Doncaster; external governing bodies such as UEFA, the European Club Association and FIFA have never formally stated their position on Rangers but have issued general remarks about the continuation of a club's history when controlled by a new company.

In 2013, numerous complaints were made to the Advertising Standards Authority (ASA) over official marketing communications from Rangers which stated they were "Scotland's most successful club", with this claim being disputed as the complainants declared the club had only been in existence for one year. Having considered the evidence including advice from UEFA, the ASA did not uphold the complaints.

In July 2012, a large banner was displayed at Celtic Park during a game showing a cartoon zombie representing Rangers rising from the grave before being shot by a sniper, drawing criticism due to the gunman resembling a paramilitary from the Northern Ireland conflict, although Celtic escaped formal punishment over the matter. Celtic fan groups have continued to display banners claiming Rangers are 'dead'.

Celtic and their followers also became involved in other legal proceedings relating to Rangers, including the outcome of the long-running EBT investigation.

=== Results on the field ===
It took Rangers four years to climb through the lower divisions and re-take their place in the Scottish Premiership for the 2016–17 season; in the interim only two cup semi-finals were played between the clubs and Celtic won all four league titles by significant margins (never less than 15 points). The rivalry resumed in earnest by way of six matches during 2016–17, with Celtic eliminating Rangers from both cups at the semi-final stage on the way to lifting the trophies and emerging victorious in three of the matches in the league championship, which they also won without losing a game to secure their sixth successive title and a domestic treble. The 2017–18 season was much the same: Celtic won three of the Old Firm league fixtures plus a Scottish Cup semi-final meeting and lifted all three domestic trophies; Rangers finished third, behind Aberdeen.

Celtic won a third successive treble in 2018–19, although Rangers did finally record victories over them in the league with a 1–0 and 2–0 wins in the two fixtures at Ibrox. Rangers were runners-up in the league, their highest position since 2012. In December 2019, Rangers beat Celtic 2–1 at Celtic Park, their first away win since October 2010; that 2019–20 season was curtailed due to the COVID-19 pandemic in Scotland, with Celtic declared champions having held a commanding lead when matches stopped in March 2020.

Initial signs that the 2020–21 Scottish Premiership (played almost entirely in empty stadiums due to the pandemic) would be closely fought proved inaccurate as Rangers produced consistent and defensively-strong performances, in contrast to Celtic who dropped goals and points regularly as the season progressed (although they did set a new record with a 'quadruple treble', winning twelve domestic trophies in succession). Rangers won both Old Firm fixtures and were confirmed as champions – the 55th title in their history and the first since 2011 – by early March 2021 even before the often-pivotal third fixture against Celtic was played, ending the Hoops' chances of a record-breaking tenth successive championship. A proposed (financially lucrative) first match between the clubs outside Scotland, at the Sydney Super Cup in Australia in late 2022, did not materialise when Rangers withdrew following a negative response from much of the fanbase of both clubs.

== Honours ==
List of honours won by Celtic and Rangers
Celtic	Competition	Rangers
Domestic
56	Scottish first-tier League Championships	55
43	Scottish Cup	34
22	Scottish League Cup	28
121	Aggregate	117
International
1	European Cup/UEFA Champions League	—
—	UEFA Cup Winners' Cup	1
1	Aggregate	1
122	Total aggregate	118

== All-time head-to-head record ==
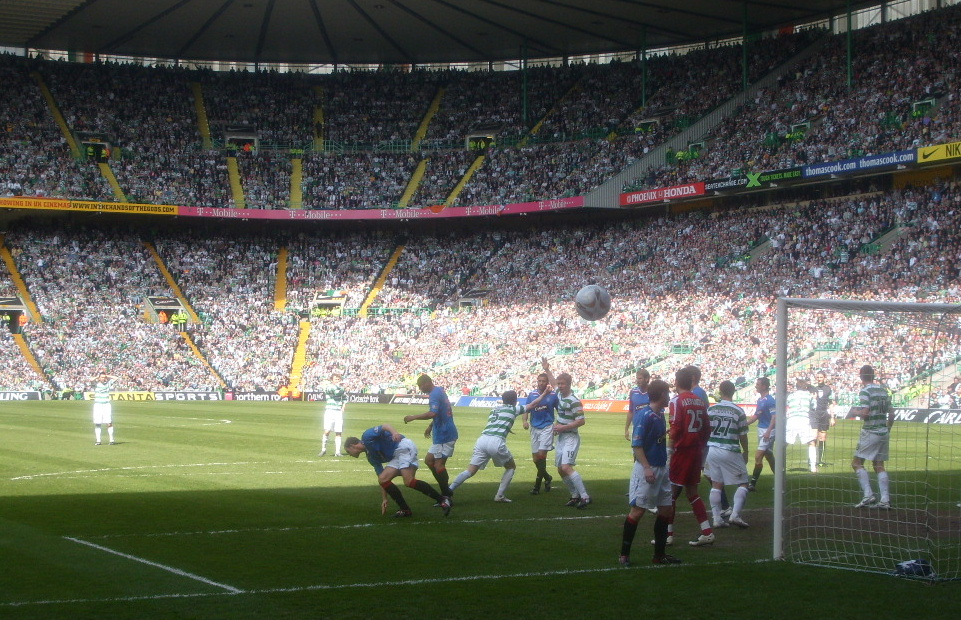
An Old Firm clash in 2008

=== Existing major competitions ===
As of match played on 20 September 2026

Competition	First match	Played	Celtic	Rangers	Draw
Scottish League	1891	344 (Note: League championship statistics include an additional play-off match for the 1904–05 title which Celtic won 2–1.)	119	131	94
Scottish Cup	1890	56 (Note: The Scottish Cup totals include two matches in the 1909 Scottish Cup final (a 2–2 draw and a 1–1 draw), although the cup itself was withheld.)	27	18	11 (Note: The 2016 Scottish Cup semi-final was won on penalties by Rangers following a draw after extra time, causing some sources to record this as a win rather than the common standard of a draw. Also included is Celtic's win on penalties in the 2026 Scottish Cup quarter-final.)
League Cup	1947	54	26	25	3 (Note: The 2024 Scottish League Cup final was won on penalties by Celtic following a draw after extra time, causing some sources to record this as a win rather than the common standard of a draw.)
Totals		454	172	174	108

=== Defunct minor competitions ===
There are a number of matches between the two clubs that are not recognised in the official records, such as their first competitive meeting in the 1888–89 Glasgow Cup, in which Celtic defeated Rangers 6–1.

Competition	Years	Played	Rangers	Celtic	Draw
Glasgow Cup (Note: The Glasgow Cup continued to be contested during World War I and World War II)	1887–1987	79	36	23	20
Glasgow Merchants Charity Cup (Note: The Glasgow Merchants Charity Cup continued to be contested during World War I and World War II)	1892–1961	46	23	16	7 (Note: 6 of the 7 drawn games were settled by coin toss or most corners, 5 in favour of Rangers)
Glasgow League / Inter City League (Note: Some of these matches also doubled as Scottish Football League fixtures, including the 1904–05 Scottish Division One playoff.)	1895–1906	19	5	10	4
Glasgow International Exhibition Cup	1901	1	1	0	0
British League Cup	1902	1	0	1	0
Benefit Tournament	1902	1	0	1	0
Midweek League	1912	1	1	0	0
Lord Provost's Cup	1921	1	1	0	0
Drybrough Cup	1971–1980	2	1	0	1 (Note: Celtic won the 1974 Drybrough Cup final on penalties.)

=== Wartime competitions ===
In World War I, the Scottish Cup was suspended. Among the unofficial competitions which were held for fundraising purposes was the Navy and Army War Fund Shield, during which Rangers defeated Celtic in December 1914.

During World War II, the Scottish Football League and Scottish Cup were suspended and in their place unofficial regional league competitions were set up (these were dominated by Rangers). One of these games was a New Year's Day derby in 1943 which Rangers won 8–1.

Competition	Years	Played	Rangers	Celtic	Draw
War Fund Shield	1914	1	1	0	0
Emergency Western League	1939–1940	2	1	0	1
Southern League	1940–1946	12	7	3	2
Southern League Cup	1940–1946	4	4	0	0
Summer Cup	1940–1946	2	2	0	0
Victory Cup	1946	2	1	0	1

== Comparative league placings ==
The dominance of the clubs can be demonstrated by their relative league positions historically. The clubs have finished in the top two positions in the top division of the Scottish league 54 times, including on 22 occasions since 1996. Both sides have finished outside the top two places only five times, three of those before 1914, and both have finished outside the top three places only once, in 1965, when Rangers finished 5th and Celtic 8th. Conversely, between 1947 and 1965, on no occasion were both the top two league positions taken by the two teams, owing mostly to an extended period in the relative doldrums for Celtic, despite a title win in 1954, their only such title in a 28-year period. Celtic, however, ended that period emphatically with a run of nine successive titles, during which Rangers were runners-up on six occasions.

=== 1890–1914 ===
P.	91	92	93	94	95	96	97	98	99	00	01	02	03	04	05	06	07	08	09	10	11	12	13	14
1	1		1	1		1		1	1	1	1	1			1	1	1	1	1	1	1	1	1	1
2		2	2		2	2		2		2	2	2			2							2	2	2
3	3				3		3		3				3	3			3	3		3				
4				4			4							4		4			4					
5		5											5								5			

=== 1914–1939 ===
P.	15	16	17	18	19	20	21	22	23	24	25	26	27	28	29	30	31	32	33	34	35	36	37	38	39
1	1	1	1	1	1	1	1	1	1	1	1	1	1	1	1	1	1		1	1	1	1	1	1	1
2		2		2	2	2	2	2						2	2		2	2			2	2			2
3	3		3						3	3			3					3		3			3	3	
4											4					4			4						
5																									
6												6													

=== 1946–1975 ===
P.	47	48	49	50	51	52	53	54	55	56	57	58	59	60	61	62	63	64	65	66	67	68	69	70	71	72	73	74	75
1	1		1	1			1	1		1	1		1		1		1	1		1	1	1	1	1	1	1	1	1	1
2		2			2	2			2			2				2				2	2	2	2	2			2		
3									3					3		3		3								3		3	3
4								4				4			4		4								4				
5				5						5	5								5										
6			6										6																
7	7				7																								
8							8												8										
9						9								9															
10																													
11																													
12		12																											

=== 1975–1998 ===
P.	76	77	78	79	80	81	82	83	84	85	86	87	88	89	90	91	92	93	94	95	96	97	98
1	1	1	1	1		1	1				1	1	1	1	1	1	1	1	1	1	1	1	1
2	2	2		2	2			2	2	2		2									2	2	2
3						3	3						3	3		3	3	3					
4								4	4	4									4	4			
5			5		5						5				5								

=== 1998–2026 ===
P.	99	00	01	02	03	04	05	06	07	08	09	10	11	12	13	14	15	16	17	18	19	20	21	22	23	24	25	26
1	1	1	1	1	1	1	1	1	1	1	1	1	1	1	1	1	1	1	1	1	1	1	1	1	1	1	1	1
2	2	2	2	2	2	2	2		2	2	2	2	2	2							2	2	2	2	2	2	2	
3								3											3	3								3
D2																	3	1										
D3																1												
D4															1													

- Summary: Celtic with 63 higher finishes, Rangers with 66 higher finishes (as of the end of the 2025–26 season).

== Biggest wins ==
* Four or more goals difference between the teams. Only includes the league and two major cups; other big winning margins were recorded in minor competitions such as the Glasgow Merchants Charity Cup.

=== Celtic ===
==== 6-goal margin ====
- Celtic 7–1 Rangers on 19 October 1957, Scottish League Cup

==== 5-goal margin ====
- Celtic 5–0 Rangers on 21 March 1925, Scottish Cup
- Celtic 5–0 Rangers on 29 April 2018, Scottish Premiership

==== 4-goal margin ====
- Celtic 6–2 Rangers on 14 December 1895, Scottish Division One
- Rangers 0–4 Celtic on 27 September 1898, Scottish Division One
- Celtic 4–0 Rangers on 10 March 1900, Scottish Cup
- Celtic 4–0 Rangers on 1 January 1914, Scottish Division One
- Celtic 6–2 Rangers on 10 September 1938, Scottish Division One
- Celtic 5–1 Rangers on 3 January 1966, Scottish Division One
- Celtic 4–0 Rangers on 26 April 1969, Scottish Cup
- Celtic 5–1 Rangers on 21 November 1998, Scottish Premier League
- Celtic 6–2 Rangers on 27 August 2000, Scottish Premier League
- Celtic 5–1 Rangers on 10 September 2016, Scottish Premiership
- Rangers 1–5 Celtic on 29 April 2017, Scottish Premiership
- Celtic 4–0 Rangers on 15 April 2018, Scottish Cup
- Celtic 4–0 Rangers on 3 September 2022, Scottish Premiership

=== Rangers ===
==== 5-goal margin ====
- Rangers 5–0 Celtic on 2 September 1893, Scottish League
- Rangers 5–0 Celtic on 1 January 1894, Scottish Division One

==== 4-goal margin ====
- Celtic 0–4 Rangers on 24 September 1898, Scottish Division One
- Rangers 4–0 Celtic on 14 April 1928, Scottish Cup
- Celtic 0–4 Rangers on 2 January 1948, Scottish League Division A
- Rangers 4–0 Celtic on 24 September 1949, Scottish League Division A
- Celtic 0–4 Rangers on 31 August 1955, Scottish League Cup
- Celtic 1–5 Rangers on 10 September 1960, Scottish Division One
- Rangers 4–0 Celtic on 1 January 1963, Scottish Division One
- Rangers 5–1 Celtic on 27 August 1988, Scottish Premier Division
- Rangers 4–0 Celtic on 26 March 2000, Scottish Premier League
- Rangers 5–1 Celtic on 26 November 2000, Scottish Premier League

== Players ==
=== Played for both teams ===
The ferocity of the rivalry has made it rare for a player to represent both teams during his career. Players who played for both sides of the Old Firm included Alec Bennett, Scott Duncan, Robert Campbell, and George Livingstone, who all played before the intensity of the rivalry had started prior to 1912, as well as later players: Alfie Conn, Maurice Johnston, Kenny Miller, Steven Pressley and Mark Brown (none of whom moved directly between the two clubs).

==== Pre-World War I ====
- Tom Dunbar (Celtic 1888–1891, Rangers 1891–1892, Celtic 1892–1898)
- John Cunningham (Celtic 1889–1892, Rangers ?–?)
- Allan Martin (Rangers 1891–1892, Celtic 1895–1896)
- Alex King (Rangers 1895, Celtic 1896–1900)
- George Livingstone (Celtic 1901–1902, Rangers 1906–1909)
- Alec Bennett (Celtic 1903–1908, Rangers 1908–1918)
- Tom Sinclair (Rangers 1904–1906, Celtic 1906–1907)
- Robert Campbell (Celtic 1905–1906, Rangers 1906–1914)
- Hugh Shaw (Rangers 1905–1906, Celtic 1906–1907)
- Willie Kivlichan (Rangers 1905–1907, Celtic 1907–1911)
- David Taylor (Rangers 1906–1911, Celtic 1918–1919 wartime guest)
- Davie McLean (Celtic 1907–1909, Rangers 1918–1919)
- Scott Duncan (Rangers 1913–1918, Celtic 1918–1919 wartime guest)
- James Young (Celtic 1917–1918, Rangers 1917–1918)

==== Post-World War I ====
- Tully Craig (Celtic 1919–1922, Rangers 1923–1935)
- Alfie Conn (Rangers 1968–1974, Celtic 1977–1979)
- Mo Johnston (Celtic 1984–1987, Rangers 1989–1991)
- Kenny Miller (Rangers 2000–2001, Celtic 2006–2007, Rangers 2008–2011, Rangers 2014–2018)
- Steven Pressley (Rangers 1990–1994, Celtic 2006–2008)
- Mark Brown (Rangers 1997–2001, Celtic 2007–2010)

==== Opposite clubs during youth and senior careers ====
- John Dowie (youth career Rangers, senior career Celtic)
- Gordon Marshall (youth career Rangers, senior career Celtic)
- Craig Beattie (youth career with both Rangers and Celtic, senior career Celtic)
- Sean Fitzharris (youth career with both Rangers and Celtic, senior career Celtic)
- Greig Spence (youth career Rangers, senior career Celtic)
- Joe Thomson (youth career with both Rangers and Celtic, senior career Celtic)
- Dylan McGeouch (youth career with both Celtic and Rangers, senior career Celtic)
- Gregg Wylde (youth career with both Celtic and Rangers, senior career Rangers)
- Barry Robson (youth career Rangers, senior career Celtic)
- Michael O'Halloran (youth career Celtic, senior career Rangers)
- Liam Burt (youth and senior career with both Celtic and Rangers)
- Lewis Morgan (youth career Rangers, senior career Celtic)
- Greg Taylor (youth career Rangers, senior career Celtic)

=== Families ===
Several sets of brothers have played in the Old Firm match, although not necessarily together:

- Michael Dunbar and Tom Dunbar (Celtic)
- John McPhail and Billy McPhail (Celtic)
- Frank Brogan and Jim Brogan (Celtic)
- Derek Ferguson and Barry Ferguson (Rangers)
- Gordon Marshall and Scott Marshall (Celtic)

Those who were teammates in the fixture include:

- Willie Maley and Tom Maley (Celtic)
- John McPherson and David McPherson (Rangers)
- Andrew McCreadie and Hugh McCreadie (Rangers)
- Jimmy McStay and Willie McStay (Celtic)
- Frank O'Donnell and Hugh O'Donnell (Celtic)
- Willie McStay and Paul McStay (Celtic, great-nephews of the earlier brothers)
- Frank de Boer and Ronald de Boer (Rangers, twins)

In the 1890s, Tom Dunbar spent a season with Rangers between two spells for Celtic, but he and his brother Mick (see above) never played against each other in the fixture. In the 1980s, the McAdam brothers played on opposite sides, and directly against one another, on several occasions: defender Tom for Celtic and forward Colin for Rangers.

Father-and-son pairs who have been selected include:

- Sandy Clark and Nicky Clark (Rangers)
- Mike Conroy Sr. and Mike Conroy Jr. (Celtic)
- John Divers Sr. and John Divers Jr. (Celtic)
- Patsy Gallacher and Willie Gallacher (Celtic)
- Jimmy McMenemy and John McMenemy (Celtic)
- Jackie McNamara Sr. and Jackie McNamara Jr. (Celtic)
- Jimmy Parlane and Derek Parlane (Rangers)
- Nicol Smith and Jimmy Smith (Rangers)

Jimmy Simpson was a Rangers captain in the 1930s, while his son Ronnie Simpson was Celtic's European Cup-winning goalkeeper in 1967.

== Individual records ==
=== Most appearances ===
As of end of the 2023–24 season.

- All competitions

Rank	Player	Club	Games	Years
1	Alec Smith	Rangers	87	1894–1913
2	John Greig	Rangers	74	1962–1978
3	Paul McStay	Celtic	70	1982–1997
4	Billy McNeill	Celtic	65	1958–1975
4	Dougie Gray	Rangers	65	1925–1945
6	Sandy Jardine	Rangers	64	1967–1982
7	Roy Aitken	Celtic	62	1976–1990
8	(Republic of Ireland) Packie Bonner	Celtic	60	1979–1995
8	John McPherson	Rangers	60	1890–1902
10	Danny McGrain	Celtic	58	1970–1987
11	Alec McNair	Celtic	56	1905–1924

- League games only

Rank	Player	Club	Games	Years
1	Paul McStay	Celtic	54	1982–1997
2	Roy Aitken	Celtic	51	1976–1990
3	(Republic of Ireland) Packie Bonner	Celtic	50	1980–1995
4	Sandy Jardine	Rangers	44	1967–1982
4	Danny McGrain	Celtic	44	1970–1987
6	Ally McCoist	Rangers	43	1983–1998
7	Davie Cooper	Rangers	40	1977–1989
8	Tommy Burns	Celtic	39	1976–1989
8	Peter Grant	Celtic	39	1984–1997
10	John Greig	Rangers	38	1962–1978
11	Derek Johnstone	Rangers	37	1971–1985

=== Highest goalscorers ===
As of end of the 2023–24 season.

- All competitions

Rank	Player	Club	Goals	Games	Ratio
1	Ally McCoist	Rangers	27	55	0.49
2	R.C. Hamilton	Rangers	24	46	0.52
3	Jimmy McGrory	Celtic	22	35	0.63
4	Sandy McMahon	Celtic	22	43	0.51
5	Jimmy Quinn	Celtic	18	37	0.49
6	John McPherson	Rangers	17	60	0.29
7	Alex Venters	Rangers	16	26	0.61
8	Jimmy Duncanson	Rangers	16	30	0.53
9	(Sweden) Henrik Larsson	Celtic	15	30	0.50
10	Bobby Lennox	Celtic	15	51	0.29
11	Willie Reid	Rangers	14	21	0.67
12	Alec Smith	Rangers	14	87	0.16

- League games only

Rank	Player	Club	Goals	Games	Ratio
1	Ally McCoist	Rangers	17	43	0.39
2	Sandy McMahon	Celtic	15	22	0.68
3	(Sweden) Henrik Larsson	Celtic	11	23	0.48
4	Jimmy McGrory	Celtic	10	19	0.53
5	Kenny Miller	Both (Note: Miller scored 9 league goals for Rangers, 1 for Celtic)	10	19	0.53
6	John Campbell	Celtic	9	19	0.47
7	Jimmy Quinn	Celtic	9	21	0.43
8	Derek Johnstone	Rangers	9	37	0.24
9	Derek Parlane	Rangers	8	17	0.47
10	Charlie Nicholas	Celtic	8	18	0.44
11	(England) Mark Hateley	Rangers	8	19	0.42
12	Tom McAdam	Celtic	8	30	0.27

== Managerial statistics ==
As of 20 September 2026. Minimum 10 Old Firm games as manager.

Name	Team	Years	Overall record			League record		
Name	Team	Years	Games	Wins	Win %	Games	Wins	Win %
(Northern Ireland) Brendan Rodgers	Celtic	2016–2019; 2023–2025	24	15	63%	19	11	58%
(England) Steven Gerrard	Rangers	2018–2021	13	8	62%	11	7	64%
Bill Struth	Rangers	1920–1954 (Note: 116 includes 27 unofficial wartime games) (Note: 66 includes 19 unofficial wartime games)	116	66	57%	54	29	54%
(Northern Ireland) Martin O'Neill	Celtic	2000–2005; 2025; 2026–present	33	18	55%	23	14	61%
(Australia) Ange Postecoglou	Celtic	2021–2023	11	6	55%	8	4	50%
Graeme Souness	Rangers	1986–1991	27	14	52%	20	10	50%
Walter Smith	Rangers	1991–1998; 2006–2011	56	28	50%	46	22	48%
Jock Stein	Celtic	1965–1978	58	29	50%	28	12	43%
Scot Symon	Rangers	1954–1967	61	29	48%	27	17	63%
Billy McNeill	Celtic	1978–1983; 1987–1991	46	22	48%	36	16	44%
(Northern Ireland) Neil Lennon	Celtic	2010–2014; 2019–2021	19	9	47%	15	7	47%
Gordon Strachan	Celtic	2005–2009	18	8	44%	16	6	37%
David White	Rangers	1968–1969	10	4	40%	4	3	75%
Jock Wallace	Rangers	1972–1978; 1984–1986	38	15	39%	28	9	32%
(Netherlands) Dick Advocaat	Rangers	1998–2001	16	6	37%	14	5	36%
Alex McLeish	Rangers	2002–2006	25	8	32%	18	4	22%
William Wilton	Rangers	1899–1920	96	30	31%	42	11	26%
Davie Hay	Celtic	1983–1987	21	6	29%	16	6	37%
Willie Maley	Celtic	1897–1940 (Note: 146 includes one unofficial wartime game)	146	43	29%	84	22	26%
John Greig	Rangers	1978–1983	27	7	26%	21	4	19%
Jimmy McGrory	Celtic	1945–1965	80	18	22%	38	6	16%
Tommy Burns	Celtic	1994–1997	15	3	20%	12	2	17%
Jimmy McStay	Celtic	1940–1945 (Note: All 21 are unofficial wartime games) (Note: All 4 are unofficial wartime games)	21	4	19%	0	0	0%
(Republic of Ireland) Liam Brady	Celtic	1991–1993	11	2	18%	9	2	22%
Willie Waddell	Rangers	1970–1972	12	1	8%	5	0	0%

== Attendances ==
The stadium attendance records for Rangers' Ibrox (118,567, January 1939) and Celtic's Celtic Park (officially 83,500 but estimated at 92,000 with around 10,000 more locked out, January 1938) were both set at Old Firm matches; however while the Ibrox figure is the Rangers club record (and the record for any domestic league match in the United Kingdom), Celtic's biggest 'home' attendance was the 1969–70 European Cup semi-final with Leeds United, moved to the larger Hampden Park due to the anticipated interest: the crowd of 136,505 is a record for any match in European international club competitions.

Hampden, Scotland's national stadium and home of Queen's Park, is situated roughly an equal distance from Ibrox and Celtic Park in Glasgow. Due to the frequency of the two teams appearing in semi-finals and finals held there (often facing one another), its West and East stands are always allocated to the same club and are informally known as the Rangers end and Celtic end respectively. That stadium, once the largest in the world, attracted the largest Old Firm attendance of all time with 132,870 at the 1969 Scottish Cup final (it is not the record for the competition, with 147,365 having attended the 1937 final which also featured Celtic, versus Aberdeen). The record Scottish League Cup final attendance (107,609; October 1965) was an Old Firm affair, although the tournament record was set in 1947 when Rangers overcame Hibernian in a semi-final before 123,830.

The 1971 Ibrox disaster – in which 66 Rangers supporters died in a crush on an exterior stairway – occurred at the end of an Old Firm match, although the identity of the opposition was not a factor in the incident other than having drawn a large crowd of at least 75,000 to the event.

Since redevelopments completed in the 1990s, all three venues are all-seater with much smaller capacities of between 50,000 and 60,000, meaning the above records may never be beaten – the attendance of 72,069 at 'old style' Hampden for the Old Firm 1989 Scottish Cup final has become a landmark figure as no match in Scotland has come close to matching it since.

=== Average attendances ===
When compared to other clubs in Scotland, the Old Firm maintain considerably higher attendances; Scottish football regularly posted Europe's best figures for per-capita match attendance in the 2020s, but roughly one third of this total was Rangers supporters, one third was Celtic supporters and the other third was divided between 40 clubs. Celtic's recorded crowds tend to be higher than Rangers as their stadium holds approximately 9,000 more seats. Both clubs (among others) have been accused of inflating their attendance figures by counting all season ticket holders in the crowd when many have not actually attended the match in question, with the accurate figures reported to the police for crowd control being lower.

The average attendances of both Old Firm clubs are regularly within the top twenty across Europe. A study of stadium attendance figures from 2013 to 2018 by the CIES Football Observatory ranked Celtic at 16th in the world during that period and Rangers at 18th, even though Rangers had been playing at lower levels for three of those five seasons. Celtic's proportion of the distribution of spectators in Scotland was 36.5%, the highest of any club in the leagues examined, with Rangers' 27.4% placing them 8th overall for national audience share.

Season	Celtic	Rangers	Next largest	
1996–97	47,691	48,122	Aberdeen	12,726
1997–98	48,833	49,357	Hearts	15,343
1998–99	59,233	49,094	Hearts	14,232
1999–2000	54,440	48,116	Hearts	14,246
2000–01	59,369	47,532	Hearts	12,771
2001–02	58,511	47,879	Aberdeen	14,035
2002–03	57,471	48,814	Hearts	12,057
2003–04	57,657	48,992	Hearts	11,947
2004–05	57,906	48,676	Aberdeen	13,576
2005–06	58,149	49,245	Hearts	16,767
2006–07	57,928	49,955	Hearts	16,937
2007–08	57,072	48,946	Hearts	16,288
2008–09	57,671	49,534	Hearts	14,398
2009–10	45,582	47,301	Hearts	14,745
2010–11	48,978	45,305	Hearts	14,228
2011–12	50,904	46,362	Hearts	13,381
2012–13	46,917	45,744 (Note: Club was not in the top division.)	Hearts	13,163
2013–14	47,079	42,657	Hearts	14,123
2014–15	44,585	32,798	Hearts	15,985
2015–16	44,850	45,325	Hearts	16,423
2016–17	54,726	49,156	Hearts	16,315
2017–18	57,523	49,174	Hearts	18,429
2018–19	57,778	49,564	Hibernian	17,741
2019–20	57,944	49,238	Hearts	16,751
2020–21	No figures due to the COVID-19 pandemic in Scotland			
2021–22	57,833	49,263	Hearts	17,386
2022–23	58,743	49,116	Hearts	18,501

== Dominance of Scottish football ==
The intensity of the rivalry is fuelled by the clubs' historical duopoly in Scottish football, with most meetings between them being pivotal in deciding the destiny of a championship or cup and anything but a title-winning season seen as a major disappointment, particularly as it would usually mean 'the enemy' has won the trophy.

=== League ===
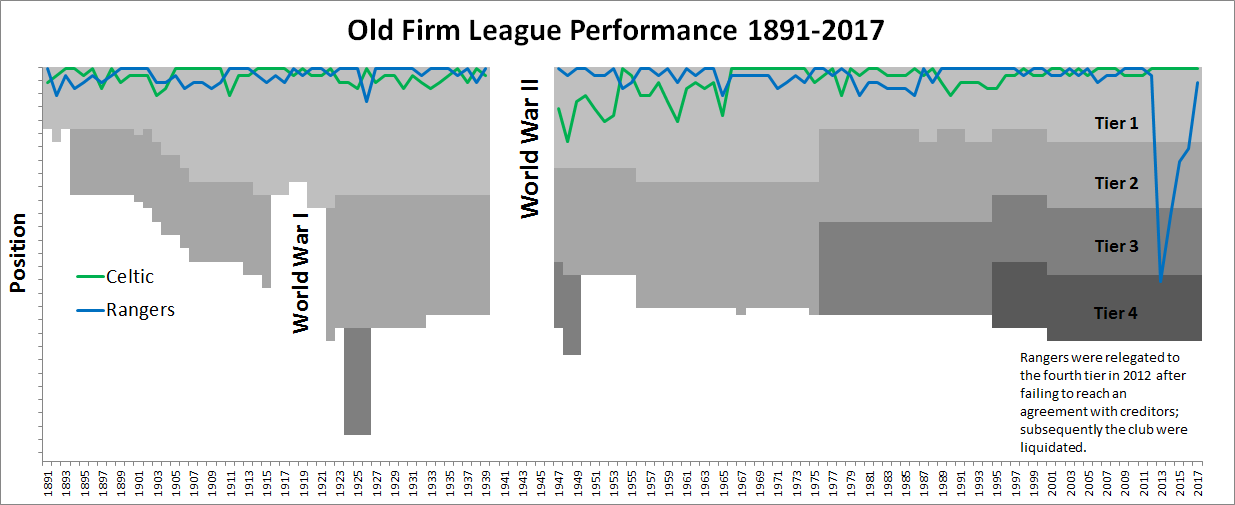
Side-by-side comparison of Celtic's and Rangers' final league positions from 1891 to 2017

Titles won by club (%) (Note: As of the end of the 2025–26 season.)
1. Celtic – 56 (43.4%)
2. Rangers – 55 (Note: The totals for Rangers and "Other clubs" each include one shared championship, in 1890–91.) (42.3%)
3. Other clubs – 19 (14.3%)

Statistics show that Rangers and Celtic have been by far the most successful clubs involved in the Scottish Football League since its formation in 1890. The pair were the only participants in every edition of the competition until 2012, when Rangers were removed from the top tier for economic reasons; they returned for the 2016–17 season. Other clubs are unable to offer even an occasional challenge over a season due to the vast disparities in fanbases and financial power, a gap which has widened since the 1990s with the majority of prize money on offer via TV deals and progress in European competitions flowing back to the Old Firm, who then re-invest and pull further ahead in a repeating cycle. In the early 2020s, despite their economic troubles over the previous decade, Rangers were able to re-establish themselves at close to the same level as Celtic and far ahead of the other clubs, who can only realistically aim to finish in the higher league positions to qualify for European competitions or win a knockout cup – which would usually involve beating at least one of the Glasgow giants. It has long been argued that this situation with its largely predictable and repetitive nature diminishes Scottish football as a commercial product and hampers the quality of players produced for the clubs and ultimately the Scotland national football team.

Of the 129 championships played, 111 (86%) have been won by one of the Old Firm teams, with Celtic winning it 56 times and Rangers 55 times, and 19 between ten other clubs (including a shared title between Rangers and Dumbarton). Although there have been brief periods when silverware went elsewhere, there have also been long spells of domination by each Old Firm club; the nine in a row championship record was first set by Celtic between 1966 and 1974, equalled by Rangers between 1989 and 1997, and again by Celtic between 2012 and 2020.

On just five occasions since 1891 have neither of the Glasgow giants been the league winner nor the runner-up. This includes 1964–65, the only season in which both Rangers and Celtic failed to finish in the top three places. The Old Firm have finished 1st and 2nd 55 times overall. Between the resurgence of Celtic in the mid-1990s and the liquidation of Rangers in 2012, '1–2' finishes were recorded in all but one of 17 SPL-era seasons, the exception being Hearts in 2005–06.

The longest sequence without an Old Firm title is three years between 1983 and 1985, while the longest unbroken run of championships between the two clubs began immediately afterwards and is ongoing: 41 seasons and counting since 1986 (overtaking a previous sequence of 27 years between 1905 and 1931).

As of end of the 2025–26 season. Runners-up in parentheses.

Outcome	Celtic	Rangers	Combined	Pct.
One club 1st, other 2nd	30 (25)	25 (30)	55	42.6%
One club 1st, other not top 2	26	30	56	43.4%
Title won by Old Firm club	56	55	111	86%
One club 2nd, other not top 2	N/A (7)	N/A (6)	13	10.1%
Neither club in top 2	N/A	N/A	5	3.9%
Title won by another club	N/A	N/A	18*	14%
Totals	56 (32)	55 (36)	129	100%

- For the purpose of the calculation, the shared 1891 title is attributed to Rangers only here to prevent it being counted twice.

=== Scottish Cup ===
Scottish Cups by club (%) (Note: As of the end of the 2025–26 edition.)
1. Celtic – 43 (30.7%)
2. Rangers – 34 (24.3%)
3. Other clubs – 63 (45.0%)

Although the initial Scottish Cup was played in 1874, 15 years before Celtic were formed, they have still won the competition more than any other club – 43 times, plus 19 runners-up – with Rangers on 34 (19 runners-up). Next in the winners list (other than Queen's Park whose wins were confined to the 19th century) are Aberdeen and Hearts with eight wins spread across 120 years. There have been 15 Old Firm finals, although never two in consecutive years, while there have been just 40 finals involving neither Rangers or Celtic, 17 of which were in the 19th century. After the 1928 final, there was no Old Firm meeting again for 28 editions until 1963, although an additional seven years had elapsed due to World War II when the cup was not contested.

The longest run of Old Firm wins is 11, between 1971 and 1981, while the longest sequence of other winners since Celtic's formation is 5, between 1955 and 1959.

Rangers' sudden removal from the upper echelons of the Scottish game in 2012 led to a more diverse list of finalists in both cups; the expected Celtic monopoly of all competitions did not occur in the knockout formats and there were several maiden trophy wins for clubs such as St Johnstone, Inverness CT and Ross County. However, after Hibernian broke a 114-year 'curse' in 2016, Celtic won the next four editions in succession, the longest winning sequence in the competition's long history.

As of end of the 2025–26 edition. Runners-up in parentheses.

Outcome	Celtic	Rangers	Combined	Pct.
Old Firm final	8 (7)	7 (8)	15	10.7%
One winner, other not involved	35	27	62	44.3%
Cup won by an Old Firm club	43	34	77	55%
One runner-up, other not involved	N/A (12)	N/A (11)	23	16.4%
Neither club involved	N/A	N/A	40	28.6%
Cup won by another club	N/A	N/A	63	45%
Totals	43 (19)	34 (19)	140	100%

==== Old Firm Scottish Cup finals ====
- Rangers wins: 1893–94, 1927–28, 1962–63, 1965–66, 1972–73, 1998–99, 2001–02
- Celtic wins: 1898–99, 1903–04, 1968–69, 1970–71, 1976–77, 1979–80, 1988–89, 2023–24
- Cup withheld: 1908–09

=== League Cup ===
Scottish League Cups by club (%) (Note: As of the end of the 2025–26 edition.)
1. Rangers – 28 (35.0%)
2. Celtic – 22 (27.5%)
3. Other clubs – 30 (37.5%)

The Scottish League Cup has been contested 80 times since 1946–47. Rangers have been the most successful team in the competition with 28 wins in 38 finals, with Celtic second with 22 wins in 38 finals. 14 other clubs share 30 wins between them. 17 of its finals have been Old Firm occasions, while 21 featured neither of them.

The longest run of Old Firm wins is 8 between 1964 and 1971, while the longest run of other winners is 7 between 1950 and 1956.

As of end of the 2025–26 edition which concluded in December 2025. Runners-up in parentheses.

Outcome	Celtic	Rangers	Combined	Pct.
Old Firm final	8 (9)	9 (8)	17	21.25%
One winner, other not involved	14	19	33	41.25%
Cup won by an Old Firm club	22	28	50	62.50%
One runner-up, other not involved	N/A (7)	N/A (2)	9	11.25%
Neither club involved	N/A	N/A	21	26.25%
Cup won by another club	N/A	N/A	30	37.50%
Totals	22 (16)	28 (10)	80	100%

==== Old Firm League Cup finals ====
- Rangers wins: 1964–65, 1970–71, 1975–76, 1977–78, 1983–84, 1986–87, 1990–91, 2002–03, 2010–11
- Celtic wins: 1957–58, 1965–66, 1966–67, 1982–83, 2008–09, 2019–20, 2022–23, 2024–25

== Women's football ==
The Rangers–Celtic rivalry in women's football has existed only in the 21st century, with Rangers W.F.C. having formed in 2008, one year after the Celtic F.C. Women. Fixtures between the teams generate additional media interest due to their association with the parent clubs, and are referred to as Old Firm matches as a result. On 13 April 2016, Celtic women's team played their first competitive match at Celtic Park, marking the occasion with a 5–1 victory over Rangers. During the 2019 season, sisters Kodie and Brogan Hay played on opposite sides in the fixture.

The dynamic of women's football in Scotland differs to the men's, with a third team in the city – Glasgow City F.C. – dominating the semi-professional Scottish Women's Premier League, winning 14 consecutive titles between 2008 and 2021. In that period Rangers only finished above Celtic once (2014), while Celtic lifted a single trophy, the SWPL Cup in 2010. In 2019, both Celtic and Rangers stated they would be increasing their investment in women's football and offering professional contracts to players. It was Rangers who made the breakthrough and won the SWPL title in 2021–22, whilst Celtic defeated Glasgow City to claim both the Scottish Women's Cup and SWPL Cup. The following season began with Rangers claiming their first SWPL Cup and ended with crowds of over 10,000 at both Celtic Park and Ibrox watching the final league fixtures – in which Glasgow City fended off their increasingly well-funded rivals and regained the championship in dramatic circumstances – quickly followed by another healthy attendance at Hampden in the first Old Firm cup final in the women's game (as well as the first to be held at the national stadium), with Celtic retaining the trophy.

== See also ==
- Sport in Glasgow
- Culture in Glasgow
- Ethnicity and association football
- Association football culture
- List of sports rivalries
- List of association football rivalries
- Sectarianism in Glasgow
- Sport in Scotland
- Timeline of Glasgow history
- Politics and sports
