= 1970 Scottish League Cup final =

- Event: 1970–71 Scottish League Cup
Rangers	Celtic
1	0
- Date: 24 October 1970
- Venue: Hampden Park, Glasgow
- Referee: Tiny Wharton
- Attendance: 106,263

The 1970 Scottish League Cup final was played on 24 October 1970 and was the final of the 25th Scottish League Cup competition. The match was an Old Firm derby between Rangers and Celtic. Rangers won the match 1–0, thanks to a goal by the then 16-year-old Derek Johnstone.

== Match details ==
24 October 1970

Rangers	1–0	Celtic
Johnstone

Hampden Park, Glasgow
Attendance: 106,263

RANGERS:
GK	1	Peter McCloy
DF	2	Sandy Jardine
DF	3	Alex Miller
MF	4	Alfie Conn, Jr.
DF	5	Ronnie McKinnon (c)
DF	6	Colin Jackson
MF	7	Willie Henderson
MF	8	Alex MacDonald
FW	9	Derek Johnstone
FW	10	Colin Stein
MF	11	Willie Johnston
Substitutes:
?	?	Graham Fyfe
Manager:
Willie Waddell

CELTIC:
GK	1	Evan Williams
DF	2	Jim Craig
DF	3	Jimmy Quinn
MF	4	Bobby Murdoch
DF	5	Billy McNeill (c)
DF	6	David Hay
MF	7	Jimmy Johnstone
MF	8	George Connelly
FW	9	Willie Wallace
MF	10	Harry Hood	Substituted off
FW	11	Lou Macari
Substitutes:
MF	?	Bobby Lennox	Substituted on
Manager:
Jock Stein
