= Norrie Martin =

Scottish footballer

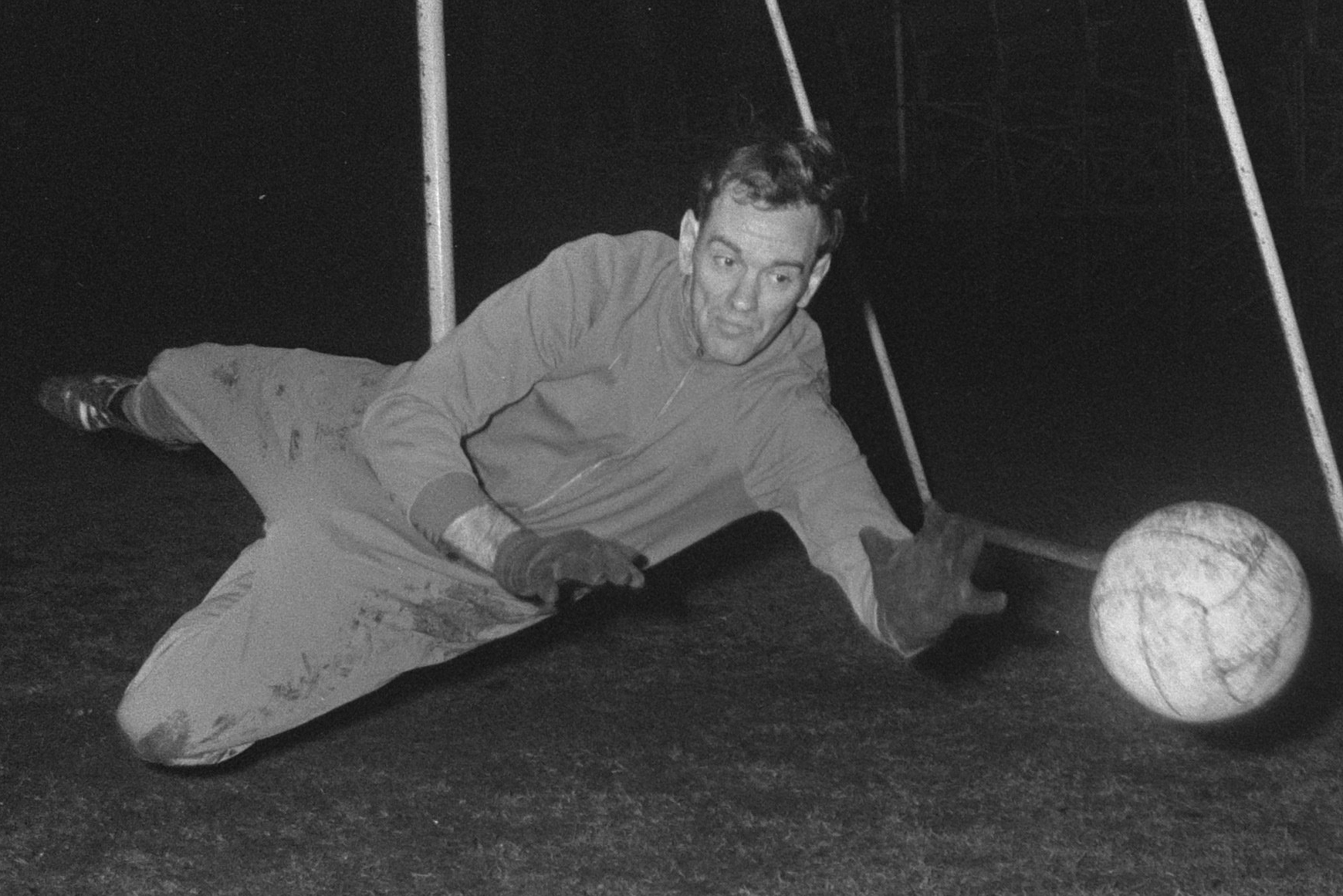
- Norrie Martin (1969)

Personal information
- Full name: Neil Martin
- Date of birth: 7 May 1939
- Place of birth: Ladybank, Scotland
- Date of death: 10 October 2013 (aged 74)
- Place of death: Prestwick, Scotland
- Position: Goalkeeper

Youth career
- Dalry Thistle

Senior career*
Years	Team	Apps	(Gls)
1957	Hamilton Academical	0	(0)
1957–1958	Dalry Thistle		(0)
1958–1970	Rangers	75	(0)
1970	East Fife	2	(0)
1970	Queen of the South	4	(0)
1970–1971	Hamilton Academical	4	(0)
Total		85	(0)
- * Club domestic league appearances and goals

Neil "Norrie" Martin (7 May 1939 – 10 October 2013) was a Scottish footballer best known for playing for Rangers. He was a goalkeeper.

== Football career ==
Born in Fife but raised in Ayrshire, Martin started his career at Junior side Dalry Thistle and joined Hamilton Academical in 1957 but after a few months he moved back to Dalry.

A year later he joined Rangers, but had poor luck with injuries and became the understudy to Billy Ritchie at Ibrox. He managed to make 75 league appearances for the club over 12 years, 115 in total. his most active seasons were 1966–67 in which he played in the finals of the Scottish League Cup and the European Cup Winners' Cup, and 1968–69 when he took part in the Scottish Cup Final, however Rangers lost to Celtic on both domestic occasions and to Bayern Munich in the continental event.

Martin left Rangers to join East Fife in 1970 but only made two league appearances before leaving to join Queen of the South a few months later. In Dumfries he made four league appearances and then re-joined Hamilton for the rest of the 1970-71 season.

== Post-playing career ==
Upon retirement, Martin took over the family business - his father owned a hotel in Prestwick. Martin died of lung cancer on 10 October 2013 at his home in Prestwick after a short illness.
