= 1978 Scottish League Cup final =

- Event: 1977–78 Scottish League Cup
Rangers	Celtic
2	1
- Date: 18 March 1978
- Venue: Hampden Park, Glasgow
- Referee: D. Syme
- Attendance: 60,168

The 1978 Scottish League Cup final was played on 18 March 1978 and was the final of the 32nd Scottish League Cup competition. It was contested by the Old Firm derby rivals, Rangers and Celtic. Rangers won the match 2–1 after extra time thanks to goals by Davie Cooper and Gordon Smith.

== Match details ==
18 March 1978

Rangers	2–1 (a.e.t.)	Celtic
Cooper; Smith		Eðvaldsson

Hampden Park, Glasgow
Attendance: 60,168

RANGERS:
GK	1	Stewart Kennedy
DF	2	Sandy Jardine
DF	3	John Greig (c)
DF	4	Tom Forsyth
DF	5	Colin Jackson
MF	6	Alex MacDonald
MF	7	Tommy McLean
MF	8	Johnny Hamilton	Substituted off
FW	9	Derek Johnstone
FW	10	Gordon Smith
MF	11	Davie Cooper		Substituted off
Substitutes:
DF	?	Alex Miller	Substituted on
FW	?	Derek Parlane		Substituted on
Manager:
Jock Wallace

CELTIC:
GK	1	Peter Latchford
DF	2	Alan Sneddon
DF	3	Andy Lynch	Substituted off
DF	4	Frank Munro
DF	5	Roddie MacDonald
MF	6	John Dowie
MF	7	Ronnie Glavin		Substituted off
MF	8	Jóhannes Eðvaldsson
FW	9	George McCluskey
FW	10	Roy Aitken (c)
MF	11	Tommy Burns
Substitutes:
MF	?	Paul Wilson	Substituted on
MF	?	Johnny Doyle		Substituted on
Manager:
Jock Stein
