= 1965 Scottish League Cup final =

- Event: 1965–66 Scottish League Cup
Rangers	Celtic
1	2
- Date: 23 October 1965
- Venue: Hampden Park, Glasgow
- Attendance: 107,609

The 1965 Scottish League Cup final was played on 23 October 1965 at Hampden Park in Glasgow and it was the final of the 20th Scottish League Cup competition. The final was contested by the Old Firm rivals Rangers and Celtic for a second consecutive year. Celtic gained revenge for their defeat in the previous final, as they won the match 2–1 thanks to two goals by John "Yogi" Hughes.

The attendance of 107,609 is a record for any League Cup final in the United Kingdom.

== Match details ==
23 October 1965

Rangers	1–2	Celtic
Young (o.g.)		Hughes (pen.) (pen.)

Hampden Park, Glasgow
Attendance: 107,609

RANGERS:
GK	Billy Ritchie
FB	Kai Johansen
FB	David Provan
RH	Wilson Wood
CH	Ron McKinnon
LH	John Greig (c)
RW	Willie Henderson
IF	Alex Willoughby
CF	Jim Forrest
IF	Davie Wilson
LW	Willie Johnston
Manager:
Scot Symon

CELTIC:
GK	Ronnie Simpson
FB	Ian Young
FB	Tommy Gemmell
RH	Bobby Murdoch
CH	Billy McNeill (c)
LH	John Clark
RW	Jimmy Johnstone
IF	Charlie Gallagher
CF	Joe McBride
IF	Bobby Lennox
LW	John Hughes
Manager:
Jock Stein
