= 1977 Scottish Cup final =

1977 Scottish Cup Final
- Event: 1976–77 Scottish Cup
| Celtic | Rangers |
| 1 | 0 |
- Date: 7 May 1977
- Venue: Hampden Park, Glasgow
- Referee: Bob Valentine
- Attendance: 54,252
- Weather: Rain

The 1977 Scottish Cup Final was played on 7 May 1977 at Hampden Park in Glasgow and was the final of the 92nd Scottish Cup. Celtic and Rangers contested the match, Celtic won the match 1–0 with Andy Lynch scoring a penalty in the 20th minute after Johnstone was judged to have handled the ball on the line.

The match was the first Scottish Cup final to be televised live since the 1955 final. Rain and the televising of the match led to it having the lowest post-war attendance for a final to that date.

This was Jock Stein's 25th trophy as Celtic manager and the last one he won.

== Final ==
7 May 1977

| Celtic | 1 – 0 | Rangers |
|---|---|---|
| Andy Lynch 20' (pen.) | Report (page 16) |

Hampden Park, Glasgow
Attendance: 54,252
Referee: Bob Valentine

=== Teams ===
CELTIC:
| GK | (England) Peter Latchford |
| DF | (Scotland) Danny McGrain |
| DF | (Scotland) Pat Stanton |
| DF | (Scotland) Roddie MacDonald |
| DF | (Scotland) Andy Lynch |
| MF | (Scotland) Alfie Conn |
| MF | (Scotland) Roy Aitken |
| MF | (Iceland) Jóhannes Eðvaldsson |
| MF | (Scotland) Paul Wilson |
| FW | (Scotland) Kenny Dalglish (c) |
| FW | (Scotland) Joe Craig |
Substitutes:
| MF | (Scotland) Tommy Burns |
| MF | (Scotland) Johnny Doyle |
Manager:
(Scotland) Jock Stein

RANGERS:
| GK | (Scotland) Stewart Kennedy |
| DF | (Scotland) Sandy Jardine |
| DF | (Scotland) Colin Jackson |
| DF | (Scotland) John Greig (c) |
| DF | (Scotland) Tom Forsyth |
| MF | (Scotland) Tommy McLean |
| MF | (Scotland) Kenny Watson | (substituted off) 71' |
| MF | (Scotland) Johnny Hamilton |
| MF | (Scotland) Alex MacDonald |
| FW | (Scotland) Derek Johnstone |
| FW | (Scotland) Derek Parlane |
Substitutes:
| FW | (Scotland) Chris Robertson | (substituted on) 71' |
| MF | (Scotland) Alex Miller |
Manager:
(Scotland) Jock Wallace
