= 1966 Scottish League Cup final =

- Event: 1966–67 Scottish League Cup
Rangers	Celtic
0	1
- Date: 29 October 1966
- Venue: Hampden Park, Glasgow
- Attendance: 94,532

The 1966 Scottish League Cup final was played on 29 October 1966 at Hampden Park in Glasgow and it was the final of the 21st Scottish League Cup competition. The final was contested by the Old Firm rivals Rangers and Celtic for a third consecutive year. Celtic won the match 1–0, with Bobby Lennox scoring the only goal.

This meant that Celtic completed the first leg of the Quadruple in 1966–67, as they won all three major Scottish domestic honours and the 1967 European Cup Final.

== Match details ==
29 October 1966

Rangers	0–1	Celtic
	Report (Page 4)	Lennox

Hampden Park, Glasgow
Attendance: 94,532

RANGERS:
GK	Norrie Martin
FB	Kai Johansen
FB	David Provan
RH	John Greig (c)
CH	Ron McKinnon
LH	Dave Smith
RW	Willie Henderson
IF	Bobby Watson
CF	George McLean
IF	Alex Smith
LW	Willie Johnston	Substituted off
Substitutes:
LW	Davie Wilson	Substituted on
Manager:
Scot Symon

CELTIC:
GK	Ronnie Simpson
FB	Tommy Gemmell
FB	Willie O'Neill
RH	Bobby Murdoch
CH	Billy McNeill (c)
LH	John Clark
RW	Jimmy Johnstone
IF	Bobby Lennox
CF	Joe McBride
IF	Bertie Auld
LW	John Hughes	Substituted off
Substitutes:
FW	Stevie Chalmers	Substituted on
Manager:
Jock Stein
