= 1945–46 Rangers F.C. season =

Rangers
1945–46 season
- Chairman: James Bowie
- Manager: Bill Struth
- Ground: Ibrox Park
- Southern League Division One: 1st P30 W22 D4 L4 F85 A41 Pts48
- Victory Cup: Winners
- Southern League Cup: Runners-up
- Top goalscorer: League: Willie Thornton, Jimmy Duncanson (18); All: Willie Thornton, Jimmy Duncanson (25)
Home colours	Away colours

The 1945–46 season was the 7th and final year of wartime football by Rangers.

== Results ==
All results are written with Rangers' score first.

=== Southern League Division One ===
Date	Opponent	Venue	Result	Attendance	Scorers
11 August 1945	Motherwell	A	0–3		
16 August 1945	Partick Thistle	H	4–2		
18 August 1945	Hibernian	A	1–2		
1 September 1945	Kilmarnock	A	7–0		
8 September 1945	Celtic	H	5–3		
15 September 1945	Third Lanark	A	5–1		
22 September 1945	Falkirk	H	1–0		
29 September 1945	St Mirren	A	2–2		
13 October 1945	Aberdeen	H	3–1	65,000	
20 October 1945	Queen's Park	A	2–0		
27 October 1945	Morton	A	2–2		
3 November 1945	Hamilton Academical	A	5–1		
10 November 1945	Queen of the South	A	4–2		
17 November 1945	Heart of Midlothian	H	1–1	16,000	
24 November 1945	Motherwell	A	2–1		
1 December 1945	Hibernian	H	3–2		
8 December 1945	Partick Thistle	A	5–1		
15 December 1945	Kilmarnock	H	5–1		
22 December 1945	Third Lanark	H	1–0		
25 December 1945	Clyde	H	4–1		
29 December 1945	Falkirk	A	3–0		
1 January 1946	Celtic	A	1–0		
2 January 1946	St Mirren	H	3–1		
5 January 1946	Clyde	A	1–0		
12 January 1946	Aberdeen	A	1–4	30,000	
19 January 1946	Queen's Park	H	2–1		
26 January 1946	Morton	H	4–4		
2 February 1946	Hamilton Academical	A	4–1		
9 February 1946	Queen of the South	H	5–2		
16 February 1946	Heart of Midlothian	A	0–2	36,177	

=== Southern League Cup ===
Date	Round	Opponent	Venue	Result	Attendance	Scorers
23 February 1946	SR	Queen of the South	H	4–0		
2 March 1946	SR	Motherwell	A	3–0		
9 March 1946	SR	Morton	H	1–0		
16 March 1946	SR	Queen of the South	A	2–0		
23 March 1946	SR	Motherwell	H	4–2		
30 March 1946	SR	Morton	A	1–1		
6 April 1946	QF	Dundee	N	3–1		
27 April 1946	SF	Heart of Midlothian	N	3–1	70,000	
11 May 1946	F	Aberdeen	N	2–3	130,000	

=== Victory Cup ===
Date	Round	Opponent	Venue	Result	Attendance	Scorers
20 April 1946	R1 L1	Stenhousemuir	A	4–1		
22 April 1946	R1 L2	Stenhousemuir	H	4–1		
4 May 1946	R2	Airdrieonians	A	4–0		
18 May 1946	QF	Falkirk	A	1–1		
25 May 1946	QF	Falkirk	H	2–0		
1 June 1946	SF	Celtic	N	0–0		
5 June 1946	SF R	Celtic	N	2–0		
15 June 1946	F	Hibernian	N	3–1	100,000	Gillick, Duncanson(2)

=== Friendlies ===
Date	Opponent	Venue	Result	Attendance	Scorers
28 November 1945	Dynamo Moscow	H	2–2	90,000	Smith, Young (pen)

== See also ==
- 1945–46 in Scottish football
- 1945–46 Southern League Cup (Scotland)
- 1946 Victory Cup
