= 2011 Scottish League Cup final =

- Event: 2010–11 Scottish League Cup
Celtic	Rangers
1	2
- After extra time
- Date: 20 March 2011
- Venue: Hampden Park, Glasgow
- Referee: Craig Thomson
- Attendance: 51,181

The 2011 Scottish League Cup final was the final match of the 2010–11 Scottish League Cup, the 65th season of the Scottish League Cup. It was played by Old Firm rivals Celtic and Rangers. Rangers won the trophy after extra time 2–1.

== Route to the final ==
=== Celtic ===
Round	Opposition	Score
Third round	Inverness CT	6–0
Quarter-final	St Johnstone	3–2
Semi-final	Aberdeen	4–1

As Celtic had been competing in Europe, they entered the competition in the third round. They began their campaign against Inverness Caledonian Thistle and they beat Caley 6–0, thanks to goals from Georgios Samaras (3), Gary Hooper and Anthony Stokes (2). Celtic then traveled to Perth, where they played St Johnstone. Two goals by Stokes and one from Niall McGinn gave The Bhoys a comfortable 3–0 lead. The Saints later came back into the game with goals from Sam Parkin and Murray Davidson, but Celtic held on to win 3–2. In the semi-final, Celtic played Aberdeen, who had been beaten earlier in the season by Celtic 9–0 and 1–0. Celtic scored four goals in 34 minutes (Kris Commons, Charlie Mulgrew, Thomas Rogne and Anthony Stokes) and eventually won 4–1.

This League Cup final was the 28th in Celtic's history. They have won 14 of them, the last in 2009, which means Celtic are the second-most successful team in the history of the tournament.

=== Rangers ===
Round	Opposition	Score
Third round	Dunfermline Athletic	7–2
Quarter-final	Kilmarnock	2–0
Semi-final	Motherwell	2–1

As Rangers also had been competing in Europe, they entered the competition in the third round. They began their campaign at home against First Division side Dunfermline Athletic and beat The Pars 7–2, thanks to goals from Nikica Jelavic (2) Kyle Lafferty (3), Madjid Bougherra and Steven Naismith. In the next round Rangers travelled to Rugby Park, where they played Kilmarnock in an all-SPL cup tie. The Gers won 2–0 thanks to goals from Andrew Little and Naismith. In the semi-final, Rangers played Motherwell, who had been beaten earlier by Rangers twice in the league 4–1. Rangers scored first, but Maurice Edu's strike was cancelled out by a Keith Lasley second half goal. Rangers then scored again, thanks to Naismith's third goal in this season's competition and Walter Smith's men triumphed 2–1.

This League Cup final was the 34th in Rangers' history. They have won 27 of them, which means Rangers are the most successful team in the history of the tournament.

== Match details ==
20 March 2011
15:00

Celtic	1–2 (a.e.t.)	Rangers
Ledley 31'	Report	Davis 24'; Jelavić 98'

Hampden Park, Glasgow
Attendance: 51,181
Referee: Craig Thomson

Celtic	Rangers

CELTIC:
GK	26	(England) Fraser Forster
RB	12	(Scotland) Mark Wilson	(yellow card) 95'
CB	25	(Norway) Thomas Rogne		(substituted off) 73'
CB	21	(Scotland) Charlie Mulgrew	(yellow card) 110'
LB	3	(Honduras) Emilio Izaguirre	(red card) 120+1'
RM	8	(Scotland) Scott Brown (c)		(substituted off) 65'
CM	16	(Wales) Joe Ledley
CM	33	(Israel) Beram Kayal	(yellow card) 66'
LM	15	(Scotland) Kris Commons		(substituted off) 103'
CF	9	(Greece) Georgios Samaras
CF	88	(England) Gary Hooper
Substitutes:
GK	24	(Poland) Łukasz Załuska
DF	22	(Netherlands) Glenn Loovens		(substituted on) 73'
MF	18	(South Korea) Ki Sung-Yueng		(substituted on) 65'
MF	20	(Northern Ireland) Paddy McCourt		(substituted on) 103'
FW	10	(Republic of Ireland) Anthony Stokes
Manager:
(Northern Ireland) Neil Lennon

RANGERS:
GK	25	(Scotland) Neil Alexander
RB	16	(Scotland) Steven Whittaker
CB	3	(Scotland) David Weir (c)
CB	24	(Algeria) Madjid Bougherra		(substituted off) 82'
LB	5	(Bosnia and Herzegovina) Saša Papac	(yellow card) 58'
RM	14	(Scotland) Steven Naismith
CM	7	(United States) Maurice Edu
CM	8	(Northern Ireland) Steven Davis
LM	39	(Scotland) Gregg Wylde
CF	11	(Northern Ireland) Kyle Lafferty		(substituted off) 90+3'
CF	18	(Croatia) Nikica Jelavić	(yellow card) 33'	(substituted off) 117'
Substitutes:
GK	1	(Scotland) Allan McGregor
MF	20	(Slovakia) Vladimír Weiss		(substituted on) 90+3'
MF	41	(Scotland) Kyle Hutton		(substituted on) 82'
FW	15	(Northern Ireland) David Healy
FW	17	(Senegal) El Hadji Diouf	(yellow card) 118'	(substituted on) 117'
Manager:
(Scotland) Walter Smith

MATCH OFFICIALS

- Referee: Craig Thomson
- Assistant Referee 1: Graham Chambers
- Assistant Referee 2: George Drummond
- Fourth Official: William Collum

MATCH RULES

- 90 minutes
- 30 minutes of extra-time if necessary
- Penalty shoot-out if scores still level
- Five named substitutes
- Maximum of three substitutions

=== Statistics ===
Statistic	Celtic	Rangers
Goals scored	1	2
Total shots	12	15
Shots on target	6	9
Ball possession	50%	50%
Corner kicks	6	9
Fouls committed	25	20
Yellow cards	3	3
Red cards	1	0

== Media coverage ==
In the UK, the final was broadcast live on BBC One Scotland on their Sportscene programme with build-up starting at 14:30 UTC.

Commentary of the match on radio was from BBC Radio Scotland, BBC Radio nan Gàidheal and BBC Radio 5 Live Sports Extra.

In Ireland the 2011 Scottish League Cup final was broadcast live on Setanta Ireland.
