= John Dowie (footballer) =

Scottish footballer

Personal information
- Full name: John Dowie
- Date of birth: 12 December 1955
- Place of birth: Hamilton, Scotland
- Date of death: 22 January 2016 (aged 60)
- Place of death: Hamilton, Scotland
- Position: Midfielder

Youth career
- Rangers

Senior career*
Years	Team	Apps	(Gls)
1973–1977	Fulham	37	(2)
1977–1979	Celtic	14	(0)
1978	→ Houston Hurricane (loan)	21	(2)
1979–1981	Doncaster Rovers	21	(0)
1981–1982	Clyde	9	(0)
- * Club domestic league appearances and goals

John Dowie (12 December 1955 – 22 January 2016) was a football midfielder, who played in the Football League and Scottish Football League during the 1970s and 1980s.

Dowie was at Rangers as a schoolboy but did not make the grade there and moved to Fulham in 1973, being at the club when they reached the 1975 FA Cup Final, although he did not play in the game.

In 1977, he left to join Celtic, making his debut for them on 10 September 1977 against Rangers. He also appeared for Celtic against Rangers in the 1978 Scottish League Cup Final. He did not make an appearance for the club in 1978-79 and left to join Doncaster Rovers in April 1979.

Dowie played a total of 25 senior games for Rovers, scoring 2 goals. He next moved to play for Clyde, making his league debut in the 1981-82 season. After Clyde he moved to Australia to play for the Doveton club.
