= Jock Stein =

Scottish football player and manager (1922–1985)

Jock Stein CBE
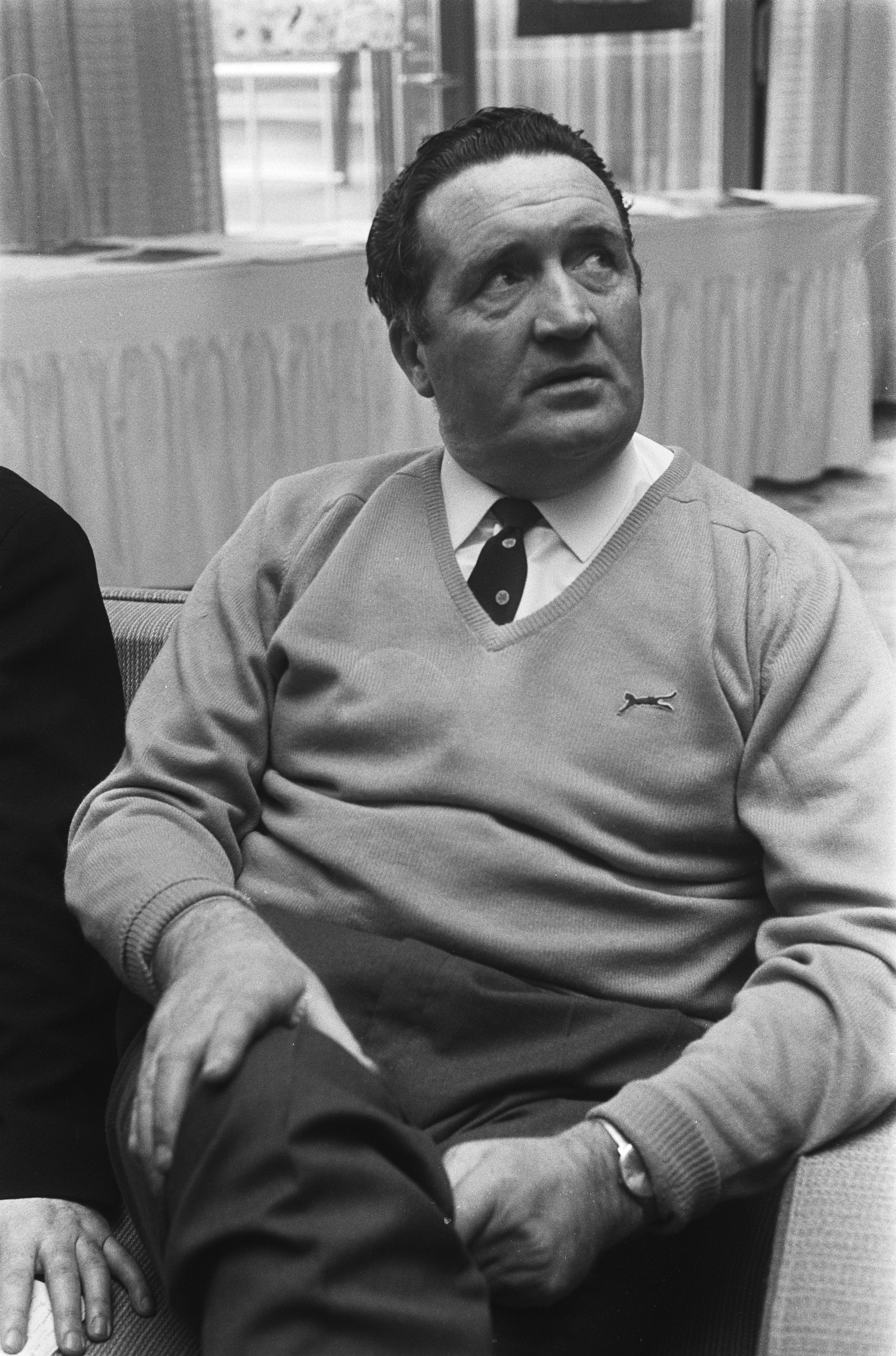
- Stein in 1971

Personal information
- Full name: John Stein
- Date of birth: 5 October 1922
- Place of birth: Hamilton, Lanarkshire, Scotland
- Date of death: 10 September 1985 (aged 62)
- Place of death: Cardiff, Wales
- Position: Centre-back

Youth career
- 1940–1942: Blantyre Victoria

Senior career*
Years	Team	Apps	(Gls)
1940–1942	Blantyre Victoria		
1942–1950	Albion Rovers	236	(9)
1950–1951	Llanelli Town	44	(5)
1951–1957	Celtic	106	(2)
Total		365	(13)

International career
1954	Scottish League XI	1	(0)

Managerial career
- 1960–1964: Dunfermline Athletic
- 1964–1965: Hibernian
- 1965: Scotland
- 1965–1978: Celtic
- 1978: Leeds United
- 1978–1985: Scotland
- * Club domestic league appearances and goals

John Stein (5 October 1922 – 10 September 1985) was a Scottish football player and manager. He was the first manager of a club from a Northern European country to win the European Cup, with Celtic in 1967. Stein also guided Celtic to nine successive Scottish League championships between 1966 and 1974.

Stein worked as a coal-miner while playing football by part-time for Blantyre Victoria and then Albion Rovers. He became a full-time professional football player with Welsh club Llanelli Town, but returned to Scotland with Celtic in 1951. He enjoyed some success with Celtic, winning the Coronation Cup in 1953 and a Scottish league and Scottish Cup double in 1954. Ankle injuries forced Stein to retire from playing football in 1957.

Celtic appointed Stein to coach their reserve team after he retired as a player. Stein started his managerial career in 1960 with Dunfermline, where he won the Scottish Cup in 1961 and achieved some notable results in European football. After a brief but successful spell at Hibernian, Stein returned to Celtic as manager in March 1965. In thirteen years at Celtic, Stein won the European Cup, ten Scottish league championships, eight Scottish Cups and six Scottish League Cups. After a brief stint with Leeds United, Stein managed Scotland from 1978 until his death just before the end of a World Cup qualifying match in 1985.

== Early life and playing career ==
John Stein was born on 5 October 1922 at 339 Glasgow Road in Hamilton, Lanarkshire, the only son of four children to George Stein, a coal miner, and Jane Armstrong. Stein saw football as his escape from the Lanarkshire coal mines. In 1937, he left Greenfield school in Hamilton and after a short time working in a carpet factory went down the pits to become a miner. In 1940, Stein agreed to sign for Burnbank Athletic, but his father vehemently objected. Soon afterward, he instead joined Blantyre Victoria, another local junior club.

Stein first played for senior club Albion Rovers as a trialist in a 4–4 draw against Celtic on 14 November 1942. On 3 December 1942, manager Webber Lees signed Stein for the Coatbridge club. He continued to work as a miner during the week, which was a reserved occupation during the Second World War. This allowed Stein to play regularly, as many of their other players were serving in the Armed Forces. He had a brief loan spell with Dundee United in 1943. Rovers won promotion to the First Division in 1947–48, for only the fourth time in the club's history.

During the 1948–49 season, Rovers conceded 105 goals, won only three league games out of 30 and were relegated back to the Second Division.

According to Rovers' historian Robin Marwick, Stein played 236 matches for Rovers, who were his longest serving senior club as a player. He scored nine goals, six of which were penalties (he also missed two penalties). His last Rovers appearance was against Alloa in a B Division match on 14 January 1950.

In 1950, having been approached by former Albion Rovers teammate Dougie Wallace, Stein signed for non-league Welsh club Llanelli. For the first time in his career, he became a full-time professional footballer, earning £12 per week. Llanelli had gained promotion to the Southern League in 1950 and signed several Scottish professionals. In 1951, the club's application to join the Football League was rejected and there were rumours of financial problems. All but two of the Scottish professionals left.

Stein initially left his wife, Jean, and young daughter, Ray, in Scotland when he moved to Llanelli. His family moved down soon afterwards, but his council house in Hamilton was burgled about eight weeks after they moved. Jean wanted to return to Scotland, and Stein accepted her desire in light of his own disillusionment with the problems at the club. When asked what he would do by the Llanelli manager, Stein said he would probably quit football and become a miner again.

In December 1951, on the recommendation of reserve team trainer Jimmy Gribben, Celtic bought him for £1,200. He was signed as a reserve but injuries incurred by first team players resulted in him being elevated to the first team. In 1952, he was appointed vice-captain; when captain Sean Fallon suffered a broken arm, the captaincy was passed to Stein.

Celtic finished eighth in the Scottish League during 1952–53 and were only invited to the pan-British Coronation Cup tournament due to their large support base. Celtic beat Arsenal, Manchester United and Hibernian to win the trophy. This success was built upon in 1953–54, as Stein captained the side that won a League and Scottish Cup double. It was their first League championship since 1938 and first League and Scottish Cup double since 1914. As a reward for their achievement, the club paid for all of the players to attend the 1954 FIFA World Cup in Switzerland. Celtic had also sent their players to watch the England v Hungary match in 1953. Stein was influenced by Scotland's poor preparation and the impressive performance of Hungary.

Stein received his only international recognition in 1954, when he was selected for the Scottish Football League XI. It was not a happy experience for Stein, as his direct opponent, Bedford Jezzard, scored two goals as The Football League XI won 4–0 at Stamford Bridge.

In 1954–55, Celtic finished second in the league and lost the 1955 Scottish Cup final to Clyde. Stein was forced to retire from football after suffering persistent ankle injuries during the 1955–56 season. While playing in a friendly in Coleraine in May 1956, he landed awkwardly and rolled over on the ankle. Two weeks later he had an operation to remove a bone nodule, after which he was ordered to rest until fully recuperated. While on a holiday in Blackpool, the ankle irritated Stein, who found that it had become septic. He was no longer able to flex the joint and had to stop playing, officially retiring on 29 January 1957.

== Managerial career ==
=== Celtic reserves ===
In July 1957, Stein was given the job of coaching the Celtic reserve team. His squad included a number of young players who would later play under him in the first team, including Billy McNeill, Bobby Murdoch and John Clark. In his first season as a coach, Stein won the Reserve Cup with an 8–2 aggregate triumph over Rangers.

Despite this success, according to football journalist Archie MacPherson, Stein was told by club chairman Robert Kelly he would not progress further at Celtic due to his Protestant faith; Celtic had only previously appointed Catholics as managers, though one of these, Willie Maley had spent 50 years at the club and Stein was only the fourth person to be appointed Celtic manager, after Maley, Jimmy McStay and Jimmy McGrory, who was manager for 20 years. It was later suggested that Stein was allowed to leave Celtic temporarily with the intention of later appointing him manager, but MacPherson found no evidence for this.

=== Dunfermline ===
On 14 March 1960, Stein was appointed manager of Dunfermline. When Stein was appointed, the team were only two points above last place and mired in a battle against relegation. The team had not won in four months, but then won their first six matches managed by Stein. To build upon this initial success, Stein signed Willie Cunningham and Tommy McDonald from Leicester City. Dunfermline became a powerful force and Stein guided them to their first Scottish Cup victory in 1961, winning 2–0 in a replayed final against Celtic. This success prompted job offers from Newcastle United and Hibernian, both of which were rejected by Stein.

In the 1961–62 season, Dunfermline progressed to the quarter-final of the 1961–62 European Cup Winners' Cup and finished in fourth place in the league. Their league position earned a place in the Fairs Cup after a Greek club withdrew. Dunfermline defeated Everton in the 1962–63 Fairs Cup and retrieved a four-goal deficit against Valencia, but then lost in a play-off game. Towards the end of the 1963–64 season, it became apparent that Hibs wanted to replace their manager, Walter Galbraith. It was reported in the media on 27 February that Stein would leave Dunfermline at the end of the season. A fortnight later, amid speculation that Stein would move to Hibernian, Galbraith left the Edinburgh club. On 28 March, Dunfermline lost in a Scottish Cup semi-final against Rangers. It was announced two days later that Stein would leave Dunfermline with immediate effect, allowing him to take charge at Hibernian.

=== Hibernian ===
Stein was appointed manager of Hibernian in March 1964. Although Hibs had a bigger support base than Dunfermline and had enjoyed success in the 1950s, the club was struggling. Hibs had narrowly avoided relegation in 1963 and were sitting in 12th place when Stein was appointed. The players noticed an immediate difference from previous managers as Stein took an active part in practice sessions. Stein built his defence around John McNamee, who had been discarded by Celtic, and Pat Stanton. In midfield he had Pat Quinn and Willie Hamilton, who were talented players but had under-achieved. Hamilton had problems with drinking and gambling, but he produced his best performances under Stein's guidance. Stein led Hibs to victory in the Summer Cup, their first trophy in ten years. Neil Martin scored regularly and was capped for Scotland under Stein.

The 1964–65 league season started with an Edinburgh derby defeat by Hearts, but Hibs managed to recover from this setback. Stein invited Real Madrid for a friendly game in Edinburgh, which Hibernian won 2–0 in front of a crowd of 32,000, further boosting his prestige. Wolves asked Stein if he wanted to replace Stan Cullis as their manager. Stein then approached Celtic chairman Bob Kelly, ostensibly to ask his advice about the offer from Wolves, but in the hope that he would be offered the Celtic job instead. Kelly first offered Stein the position of assistant manager (to Sean Fallon), which Stein rejected. Kelly then offered Stein the chance to be joint manager with Fallon, but this was also rejected by Stein, who suggested he would rather go to Wolves if Celtic would not offer full control. Billy McNeill believed that Kelly's initial reluctance was due to Stein's religion. Kelly eventually agreed to offer Stein full powers over team selection. Hibs tried to convince Stein to stay, even attempting to persuade his wife Jean, but becoming Celtic manager had been his long-held ambition. While Stein was still Hibs manager, he arranged for Celtic to sign Bertie Auld from Birmingham City and allowed Hibs goalkeeper Ronnie Simpson to join Celtic. Some people claimed with hindsight that he had deliberately allowed Simpson to join Celtic before moving himself, but in fact it was due to a wage dispute.

It was announced on 31 January that Stein would leave Hibs for Celtic at the end of the 1964–65 season. Stein left Hibs in early March, after he had arranged for Dundee manager Bob Shankly to take the Hibs job. When Stein left, Hibs were near the top of the league and had reached the semi-finals of the 1964–65 Scottish Cup. Hibs had defeated Rangers in the quarter-final, in his last game as Hibs manager. They failed to win either competition, however, and Stein later admitted that "leaving Hibs at that time was probably my most embarrassing experience in football". Stein was statistically the best ever manager of Hibs, with a win rate of 62%.

=== Celtic ===
Stein returned to Celtic in March 1965, becoming the club's first Protestant manager and the fourth manager in club history. Celtic were struggling in the league and continued to have mixed results, winning his first game 6–0 at Airdrie, but then losing 4–2 to Hibs and 6–2 to Falkirk. In the period between the announcement of Stein's move to Celtic and his arrival, Celtic had progressed to the semi-finals of the 1964–65 Scottish Cup. Celtic were drawn against Motherwell, who had dangerous forwards such as Joe McBride and Willie Hunter. Stein prepared the Celtic players with tactical advice, which they had never received before. Celtic came from behind twice against Motherwell to force a replay, which they won 3–0. This set up a final against Dunfermline, who had beaten Hibs in the other semi-final. Celtic again came from behind twice before Billy McNeill scored the winning goal, giving Celtic their first Scottish Cup since 1954.

For the 1965–66 season, Stein made one major signing, Joe McBride from Motherwell. McBride rewarded Stein with 43 goals that season. Celtic lost the first Old Firm derby that season, but gained revenge by winning the League Cup final against Rangers. Celtic reached the semi-finals of the UEFA Cup Winners' Cup, but were beaten 2–1 on aggregate by Liverpool. Five minutes before the end of the second leg at Anfield, Bobby Lennox appeared to score a goal that would have put Celtic through on the away goals rule, but it was controversially disallowed for offside. Celtic were involved in a tight Scottish league championship race with Rangers, who they also played in the 1966 Scottish Cup final. The final was lost after a replay, to a goal by Kai Johansen. Stein blamed John Hughes for failing to mark Johansen. Celtic won the league championship, however, for the first time in 12 years.

Stein was very confident entering the 1966–67 season, saying to his players that he believed "we could win everything". Celtic won the first Old Firm game of the season 2–0, scoring both goals in the first five minutes. The team went on a long unbeaten run that was finally ended by a 3–2 defeat by Dundee United on 31 December. Stein surprised some observers by signing forward Willie Wallace from Hearts in December, when the team was already scoring freely and had strikers Stevie Chalmers and Joe McBride at his disposal. As it happened, McBride soon afterwards suffered a knee injury that required surgery.

In the 1966–67 European Cup, Celtic progressed through the first two rounds with relatively comfortable wins against Zurich and Nantes. Celtic then faced Yugoslav side Vojvodina, who Chalmers later described as "the best team we played in the whole tournament". A miskick by Tommy Gemmell allowed Vojvodina to score the only goal of the first leg, played in Yugoslavia. In the return game, Celtic drew the aggregate score level with a goal by Chalmers in the 58th minute. Stein was agitated during the game, frequently glancing at his watch. Near the end, he remarked to Sean Fallon that "it looks like bloody Rotterdam!", citing where a play-off match would have been held if the tie had finished level. Instead, McNeill headed in a tie-winning goal from a corner kick during injury time. Celtic then defeated Dukla Prague 3–1 in the first (home) leg of the semi-final, with Wallace scoring twice. In the return game, Celtic sustained heavy pressure but held out for a goalless draw. It became a common belief that Stein had abandoned his attacking principles for that game, but Bobby Lennox, McNeill and Chalmers all later said that Stein had not set out defensive tactics beforehand.

Four days after the second leg against Dukla, Celtic defeated Aberdeen 2–0 in the 1967 Scottish Cup final. Celtic were involved in a close race with Rangers for the Scottish league championship, decided by an Old Firm game at Ibrox on the last day of the league season. Celtic needed a point to clinch the championship. Archie Macpherson wrote in his biography of Stein that it was one of the best Old Firm games he had seen, as both sides played without a fear of losing: Rangers needed the victory to win the championship, while Stein believed Celtic's best chances lay in attacking their opponents. Rangers took the lead in the 40th minute, but Celtic equalised within a minute thanks to a "scrambled effort" by Jimmy Johnstone. Celtic went 2–1 ahead with 15 minutes remaining, when Johnstone beat some opponents then fired a left-footed shot high into the net. Roger Hynd scored an equalising goal for Rangers, but the match finished in a 2–2 draw and Celtic won the championship.

With the 3–1 aggregate victory against Dukla, Celtic progressed to the 1967 European Cup final. The other finalists were Italian giants Inter Milan, prior winners of the competition. Despite initially falling behind to an Inter penalty, his team triumphed 2–1, winning much admiration for the positive attacking quality of their football. In winning club football's most prestigious trophy, Stein became the first man not only to guide a Scottish club to champions of Europe, but also the first to achieve this honour with a British club. Furthermore, he became the first manager to win the European Treble, and remains the only manager to win the fabled Quadruple, thanks to his side's earlier League Cup triumph over Rangers. All of this was achieved with a team all born within 30 miles of Glasgow. Shortly after winning the European Cup, Bill Shankly told Stein "John, you're immortal now".

The following season, Celtic won the League and League Cup for the third season in a row. In 1969 they won another domestic treble, their second in three years. In 1970, Stein led Celtic to a League and League Cup double; they also finished runners-up in the Scottish Cup. He also guided them to a second European Cup final in 1970, knocking out Benfica and Leeds United en route, but they lost to Dutch side Feyenoord in Milan. Around this time, Manchester United made efforts to persuade Stein to join them as manager. Stein declined their advances, a decision he later told Alex Ferguson that he regretted.

He was appointed Commander of the Order of the British Empire (CBE) in 1970. Stein would have been knighted instead if not for an infamous Intercontinental Cup final match against Racing Club where four Celtic players were sent off.

The 1970s brought continued success on the domestic front. During this time Stein's Celtic completed a record of nine consecutive Scottish league championships, equalling a world record held at the time by MTK Budapest and CSKA Sofia This sustained success became routine to the extent that attendance figures fell during the later part of the run, with the decline at Celtic being above the league average. This prompted the Scottish Football League to consider league reconstruction, which was enacted in 1975.

Stein was badly injured in a car crash in 1975; he nearly died but eventually recovered. Sean Fallon assumed control as manager for most of the 1975–76 season. Stein returned to his position at the start of the 1976–77 season. Davie McParland joined Celtic at this time, replacing Sean Fallon as assistant manager and working under Stein. McParland took charge of the 'tracksuit' aspects of coaching at Celtic while Stein watched from the touchline, still not fully recovered from the serious car smash he was involved in the year before. Stein signed Hibernian's long-serving captain, defender Pat Stanton. Later on in the season, Stein signed attacking midfielder Alfie Conn from Tottenham Hotspur. It was a transfer that surprised many, given Conn had played for Rangers in the early 70s, winning the European Cup Winners' Cup for them in 1972 and scoring in a 3–2 win over Celtic in the 1973 Scottish Cup final. Conn became the first footballer post-World War II to play for both Rangers and Celtic. Celtic, helped considerably by Stanton's organisation of the defence, went on to win their tenth league and cup double; Celtic finished nine points ahead of Rangers in the league and beat them 1–0 in the 1977 Scottish Cup final courtesy of an Andy Lynch penalty.

Celtic struggled in the 1977–78 season and Stein was persuaded to stand down. He was allowed to nominate his successor, Billy McNeill, and Stein thought an agreement was in place for him to join the Celtic board of directors. Celtic instead offered a management position in their pools company, which Stein rejected as he believed he still had something to offer football. A testimonial match for Stein was played against Liverpool at Celtic Park on 14 August 1978. After the game, the Liverpool manager Bob Paisley encouraged Stein, who was three years younger than Paisley, to stay in football. There was also the example of Bill Shankly, who had experienced an unhappy retirement since leaving Liverpool in 1974.

=== Leeds United ===
In August 1978, Stein was appointed manager of Leeds United. The players at Leeds received the news well, but were concerned that Stein had never shown any previous interest in managing in England. Early results were mixed, although the Leeds chairman Manny Cussins detected some improvement from the previous few seasons, when Leeds had slipped from their dominant position in English football. Attendances at Elland Road were low and Stein apparently missed the pressure of big games against foreign opposition.

Ally MacLeod had just resigned as Scotland manager, having clung to office for only one match after their failure at the 1978 World Cup. The day after MacLeod's departure journalist Jim Reynolds had written in The Glasgow Herald in relation to Scotland's search for a new manager that "The ideal choice would, of course, have been Jock Stein, but the SFA are five weeks too late" adding that it was "most unlikely" that he could be tempted to take the Scotland job "until he has given it a real go at Elland Road." However the next day Reynolds wrote in the same newspaper that Stein was a front runner for the job and reported that former Scotland boss Willie Ormond considered him to be "the obvious choice" if he would be prepared to take the job. Stein was quoted as saying "There is little I can say about the situation. If Scotland want me they must approach the club first." However the report ended by quoting Manny Cussins as stating he was "certain Jock Stein is happy at Leeds and will not leave to take the Scottish job". He also indicated that if players could be "worth £400,000, Jock Stein must be worth four million pounds."

Stein advised commentator Archie Macpherson to make it publicly known that he would be interested in taking the job. Cussins, who had sacked Brian Clough after just 44 days in charge of Leeds in 1974, refused permission for the Scottish Football Association to speak to Stein. Cussins could not convince Stein to stay, however, and he resigned to accept the position of Scotland manager. Stein had been manager of Leeds for just 44 days, like Clough, although his tenure and departure had no bitterness or rancour.

=== Scotland ===
Stein was first appointed manager of Scotland on a part-time basis in the spring of 1965, taking charge of their attempt to qualify for the 1966 World Cup. Scotland achieved good results in their first two qualifiers, a draw against Poland and a win against Finland. Stein was criticised by the Scottish press after the team conceded two late goals and lost 2–1 at home to Poland, but they managed to beat Italy 1–0 at Hampden Park through a last minute goal by John Greig to raise some hope of qualification. Scotland suffered from several players withdrawing from the return match against Italy due to injury. Stein, by instinct an attacking coach, set his team up defensively. A 3–0 defeat meant that they failed to qualify from UEFA Group 8. Stein relinquished the Scotland job after this defeat to concentrate on his full-time role with Celtic.

After Willie Ormond resigned as manager of Scotland in May 1977, Stein was approached about replacing him, but confirmed that he intended to remain at Celtic. Amid overwhelming optimism incited by incumbent manager Ally MacLeod that Scotland would achieve great success at the 1978 FIFA World Cup, Stein was one of the few to caution against this: something he would be proven right in, as Scotland subsequently failed to qualify from the group stage.

Stein was appointed Scotland manager on a full-time basis on 5 October 1978, which was his 56th birthday. 65,872 attended his first game in charge, a 3–2 win against Norway at Hampden, despite the bus services in Glasgow being on strike. Stein had picked a team with only players based in England, but he felt that he could bring through more home-based players. He also believed that Scotland had tended to play with too much emotion and naivety, which he wanted to replace with an emphasis on retaining possession of the football. Two defeats by Belgium meant that Scotland failed to qualify for the 1980 European Championship. This was followed by losses to Northern Ireland and England in the 1980 British Home Championship, which led to some criticism in the media.

The Scots' form improved in their successful qualifying campaign for the 1982 FIFA World Cup, finishing top of their group and only losing once. Scotland travelled to Spain in the summer of 1982 in what would be the only occasion Stein would manage a side at the finals of major international tournament. Scotland swept into a 3–0 lead in their first group game against New Zealand, but then careless defending saw the Kiwis stage a comeback, scoring twice. Scotland added a further two goals near the end to restore their three-goal advantage, but concern was raised at the potential repercussions of the two New Zealand goals should goal difference become a factor.

Brazil were the next opponents, and Stein make a number of changes to his side. Danny McGrain and Kenny Dalglish were surprise omissions, while David Narey, Willie Miller and Steve Archibald came into the side. Graeme Souness took over the captaincy in McGrain's absence. Narey gave Scotland a shock lead when he opened the scoring with a powerful right-foot strike. Zico equalised just before half-time from a free kick, and then Brazil took control in the second half, scoring three times to send Scotland crashing to a 4–1 defeat. The final group game paired Scotland against the Soviet Union. The teams were level on two points each, but the Soviets had a better goal difference and this meant Scotland had to win. Joe Jordan came into the team for his first appearance at the 1982 World Cup, and he gave Scotland the lead in the first half, but the Soviets rallied and scored twice in the second half. The second goal was particularly galling for the Scots, and came as a result of defenders Alan Hansen and Willie Miller colliding with one another, allowing Ramaz Shengelia a clear run in at goal to score. Souness netted a late equaliser for Scotland, but the game finished 2–2 and Scotland went out on goal difference. Stein commented after the final match: "I am very disappointed we have not qualified. If we had played the way we did in any other section we would have gone through", adding "We have proved we can compete at this level, if not win..... Tonight I think we have done Scotland proud, both on and off the field."

Under Stein, Scotland began their qualifying campaign for the 1986 World Cup with a 3–0 win over Iceland at Hampden Park in October 1984. Paul McStay scored twice in the first half, and came close to getting a hat-trick when he struck the crossbar in the second half. Charlie Nicholas scored Scotland's third goal. Stein observed that Scotland "won with style" and singled out winger Davie Cooper along with McStay for the flair they both displayed. The Scots turned in an even better showing in their next tie, a 3–1 home win over Spain. Two first half headed goals from Mo Johnston gave Scotland a 2–0 lead at half-time. Spain pulled a goal back in the second half, but with 18 minutes remaining Kenny Dalglish dribbled past three Spanish defenders before striking a powerful shot high into the net for Scotland's third. It was Dalglish's 30th international goal, equalling the national team record held by Denis Law, and it would also be Dalglish's last. Stein described the win over Spain as "the most satisfying since I became [Scotland] manager", adding that "we scored three goals against a quality team that came to defend". Spanish manager Miguel Muñoz praised the Scots' performance, describing them as "tremendous". Performances and results were more mixed in the later qualifying ties, losing the return match in Spain, going down to a 1–0 defeat against Wales in Glasgow and scraping a narrow 1–0 win over Iceland in Reykjavík. Scotland went into their last qualifying tie, away to Wales, needing at least a draw to secure a play-off spot.

==== Assistant and Colts manager ====
The Scottish International Committee made the surprise announcement of Stein in a dual role as Scotland under-23 team manager, also known as the Colts, and assistant to the Scotland national team on 17 February 1975. Both roles were assigned on a temporary basis. His appointment was made to take the strain off manager Willie Ormond. Stein accompanied Ormond for the Wales under-23s match on 25 February, but only to observe. Aberdeen manager Jimmy Bonthrone and Rangers assistant Willie Thornton were also in attendance. Stein did not officially inherit the Colts job from Ormond until April. Stein started as Colts manager with wins over Sweden under-23s in a friendly, and Leeds United in a challenge match. He then took charge of his only competitive match in charge. It was a UEFA under-23 Championship qualifier away at the Romania under-23s. Goals from Willie Pettigrew and Willie Young meant the team opened the campaign with a 2–1 win. Despite a three match winning streak, Stein relinquished both roles soon after, as he was hospitalised as the result of a car crash.

As national team boss, Stein was also responsible for the Scottish League XI side. He took charge on four occasions, which included one during his first spell in 1965, and a further three matches between 1978 and 1980, This included the last inter-league match involving the Scottish League XI, a 2–4 defeat by the Irish League XI at Windsor Park.

== Death ==
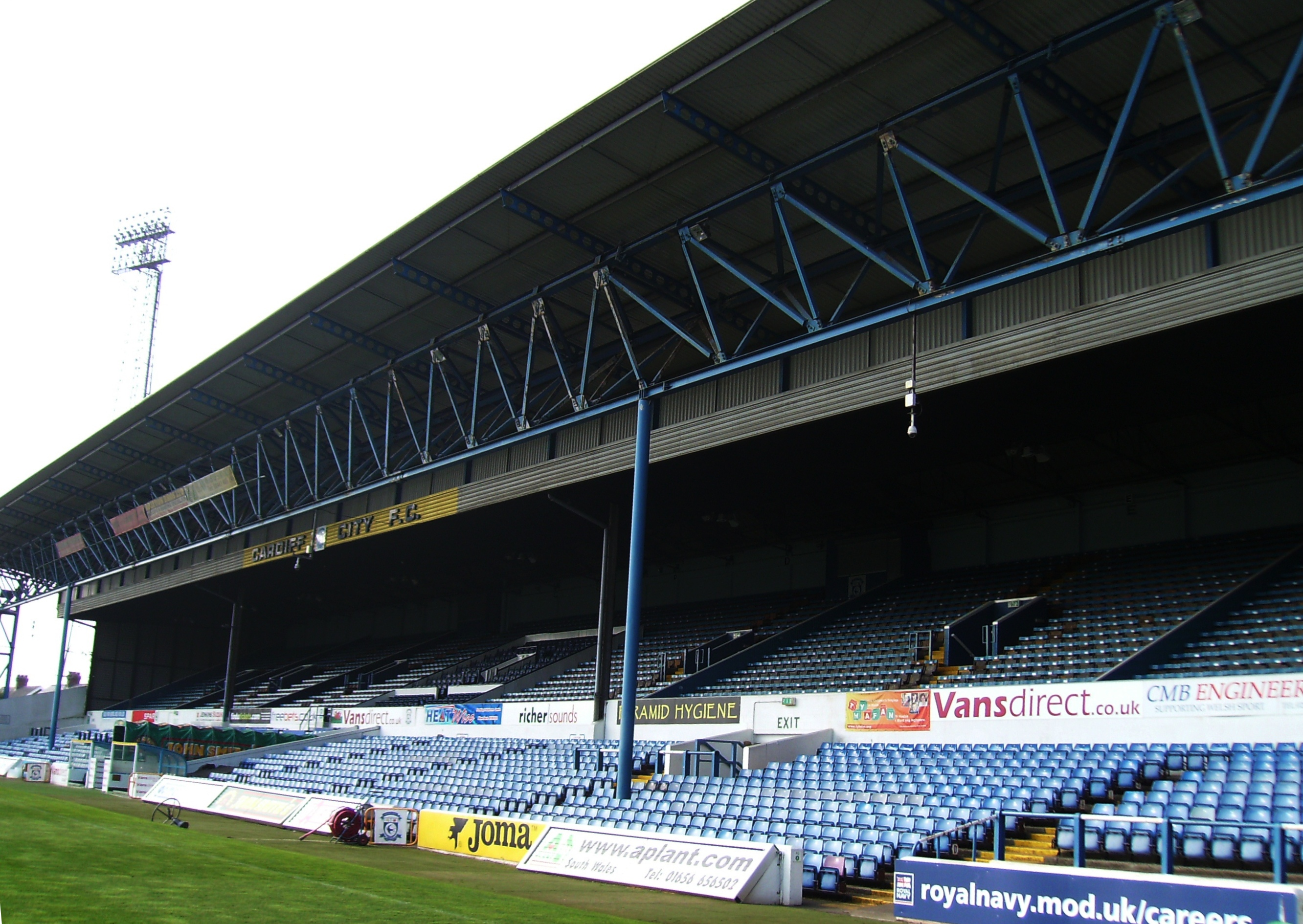
Ninian Park, where Stein died while managing the Scotland national team on 10 September 1985

On 10 September 1985, Scotland played Wales at Ninian Park, Cardiff, in a 1986 World Cup qualification match. Wales had been leading 1–0 by a Mark Hughes goal, before Scotland were awarded a penalty with 9 minutes left. Davie Cooper scored to make the score 1–1; the resulting draw secured a qualification play-off against Australia. Stein, who had been in poor health and under intense pressure, suffered a fatal pulmonary oedema (fluid build-up in the lungs) at the end of the game – he had stopped taking prescribed medication for heart disease so his match preparations would not be disrupted by the side effects – and died shortly afterwards in the stadium's medical room; he was 62 years old. Due to the circumstances, the cause of death was reported as a heart attack. Stein was cremated at Linn Crematorium in Glasgow, at a private ceremony at which many past and present football figures were in attendance.

His death had a profound effect on his assistant and Aberdeen's manager, Alex Ferguson, who regarded Stein as a mentor and was horrified by his sudden death. Ferguson was appointed interim manager and led the Scotland team to the 1986 World Cup, but they failed to progress beyond the group stage and Andy Roxburgh was appointed as Stein's permanent successor.

== Tributes and legacy ==
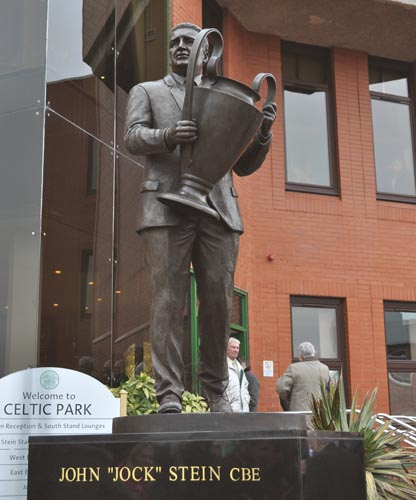
Bronze statue of Stein outside Celtic Park

Jock Stein is widely acknowledged as one of the most influential managers in the history of British football. In contrast to his predecessors, he was actively involved in his players training – a "tracksuit manager". And whereas training had previously consisted of mainly running around the track, he introduced practising with the ball into training. He is considered a football visionary; in particular for his time at Celtic where he transformed a side lacking direction and having gone almost eight years without a trophy into the best team in Europe, all whilst playing entertaining adventurous football. Prior to that, he had led Dunfermline Athletic to their first ever Scottish Cup final win. Furthermore, his man-management style and grasp of the psychological side of the game was years ahead of its time.

Stein was known to be respected by his peers and an influence on the next generation of managers who would follow in his footsteps; such as those who played under him like Billy McNeill, Kenny Dalglish, Graeme Souness, Alex McLeish, Gordon Strachan; and those who worked under him as coaches like Jim McLean, Walter Smith, Craig Brown and in particular Alex Ferguson.

Stein's use of a free–flowing 4–4–2 formation and his relentless, highly offensive strategy with Celtic in the 1967 European Cup final victory over Inter Milan in Lisbon, which saw him overcome Helenio Herrera's highly successful but more defensive–minded catenaccio tactical system, has also retroactively been compared by pundits to the similarly attacking–minded total football philosophy pioneered by Dutch manager Rinus Michels at Ajax during the 1970s. Due to their triumph, which saw them become the first Scottish and British side to win the European Cup title, the 1967 Celtic side were dubbed the "Lisbon Lions" in the press.

Since his death, Stein has been inducted into the Scottish Sports Hall of Fame and the Scottish Football Hall of Fame. When Celtic Park was rebuilt in the 1990s, the traditional Celtic fans' end of the stadium was named the Jock Stein Stand.

In 2002 Stein was voted the greatest ever Celtic manager by the club's fans, and he was voted the greatest Scottish football manager in a 2003 poll by the Sunday Herald newspaper. A bust of Stein was presented to Celtic by a supporters' group and now sits in the foyer of the stadium.

On 5 March 2011, a greater than lifesize bronze statue of Stein, by the sculptor John McKenna, was unveiled outside Celtic Park. The statue depicts Stein holding the European Cup. Celtic chairman John Reid said;

Jock will undoubtedly be remembered as one of world football's greatest ever managers – a man of immense stature and someone who gave so much to Celtic, Scotland and the game of football in general.

== Personal life ==
He married Jeanie McAuley in 1946 and they were together until his death 39 years later. They had a son George and daughter Ray. Ray died of cancer on 9 September 2006 aged 59, and was outlived by her mother, who died on 2 August 2007 at the age of 80. George was living in Switzerland by the time of his father's death.

== Managerial statistics ==
Team	Country	From	To	Record				
Team	Country	From	To	P	W	D	L	Win %
Dunfermline Athletic	Scotland	March 1960	March 1964	192	93	37	62	48.44
Hibernian	Scotland	March 1964	March 1965	50	31	8	11	62.00
Scotland	Scotland	May 1965	December 1965	7	3	1	3	42.86
Celtic	Scotland	9 March 1965	1 August 1978	761	530	120	111	69.65
Leeds United	England	August 1978	October 1978	10	4	3	3	40.00
Scotland	Scotland	October 1978	September 1985	61	26	12	23	42.62
Total				1,081	687	181	213	63.55

== Honours ==
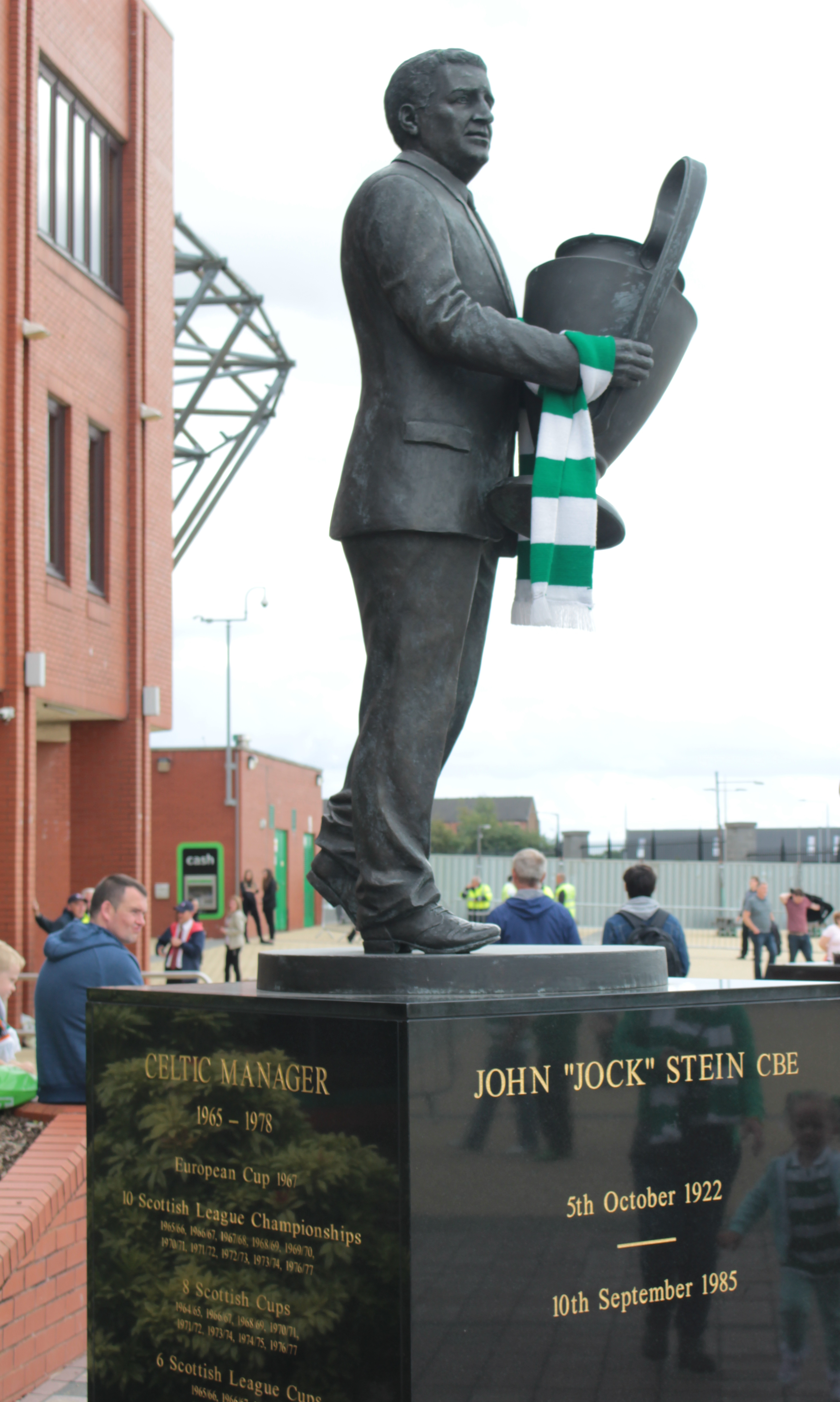
Honours won by Jock Stein Celtic FC on his statue.

=== Player ===
Albion Rovers

- Scottish B Division promotion: 1947–48
- Lanarkshire Cup: 1948–49

Celtic

- Coronation Cup: 1953
- Scottish league championship: 1953–54
- Scottish Cup: 1953–54
- Glasgow Cup: 1955–56
- Glasgow Charity Cup: 1952–53

=== Manager ===
Dunfermline Athletic

- Scottish Cup: 1960–61
- Fife Cup (3): 1959–60, 1960–61, 1962–63
- Penman Cup: 1959–60

Hibernian

- Summer Cup: 1963–64

Celtic

- European Cup: 1966–67
- Scottish league championship (10): 1965–66, 1966–67, 1967–68, 1968–69, 1969–70, 1970–71, 1971–72, 1972–73, 1973–74, 1976–77
- Scottish Cup (8): 1964–65, 1966–67, 1968–69, 1970–71, 1971–72, 1973–74, 1974–75, 1976–77
- Scottish League Cup (6): 1965–66, 1966–67, 1967–68, 1968–69, 1969–70, 1974–75
- Drybrough Cup: 1974
- Glasgow Cup (5): 1964–65, 1966–67, 1967–68, 1969–70, 1974–75

Scotland

- Rous Cup: 1985

=== Individual ===
- British Manager of the Year: 1967
- Scottish Football Personality of the Year: 1976–77, 1981–82
- Inaugural Inductee to the Scottish Sports Hall of Fame: 2002
- Inaugural Inductee to the Scottish Football Hall of Fame: 2004
- Inaugural Inductee to the Dunfermline Athletic Hall of Fame: 2004
- Sunday Herald Greatest Scottish Manager of All Time: 2003
- ESPN 17th Greatest Manager of All Time: 2013
- World Soccer 29th Greatest Manager of All Time: 2013
- Sports Illustrated 28th Greatest Manager of All Time: 2019
- France Football 34th Greatest Manager of All Time: 2019
- FourFourTwo 30th Greatest Manager of All Time: 2020

== See also ==
- List of football managers with the most matches
