= 1973–74 Celtic F.C. season =

Celtic
1973–74 season
- Manager: Jock Stein
- Stadium: Celtic Park
- Scottish Division One: 1st
- Scottish Cup: Winners
- Scottish League Cup: Finalists
- European Cup: Semi-finalists
- Drybrough Cup: Finalists

During the 1973–74 Scottish football season, Celtic competed in Scottish Division One.

Celtic won the league for the ninth season in a row, which was then a Scottish record, and has since been equaled by Rangers (1989-1997) and Celtic itself for a second time (2012-2020).

Celtic also won the Scottish Cup Final, defeating Dundee United 3-0, and narrowly missed on what would have been the club's third domestic treble as they lost the Scottish League Cup 1–0 to Dundee FC.

In European competition, Celtic made it to the semi-finals of the European Cup, where they fell to Spanish champions Atlético de Madrid, 0–2 on aggregate. Previously, they had defeated Finnish champions TPS 9–1 on aggregate, Danish champions Vejle 1–0 on aggregate, and Swiss champions FC Basel 6–5 on aggregate.

== Squad ==
Note: Flags indicate national team as defined under FIFA eligibility rules; some limited exceptions apply. Players may hold more than one non-FIFA nationality.

No.	Pos.	Nation	Player
—	GK	SCO	Evan Williams
—	GK	SCO	Denis Connaghan
—	GK	SCO	Ally Hunter
—	DF	SCO	Billy McNeill
—	DF	SCO	Jim Brogan
—	DF	SCO	Jimmy Quinn
—	DF	SCO	Danny McGrain
—	DF	SCO	Andy Lynch
—	DF	SCO	Pat McCluskey
—	DF	SCO	Frank Welsh
—	DF	SCO	Roddie MacDonald
—	DF	SCO	Jackie McNamara Sr.
—	MF	SCO	Bobby Murdoch
—	MF	SCO	David Hay

No.	Pos.	Nation	Player
—	MF	SCO	George Connelly
—	MF	SCO	Tommy Callaghan
—	MF	SCO	Vic Davidson
—	MF	SCO	Brian McLaughlin
—	FW	SCO	Jimmy Johnstone
—	FW	SCO	Bobby Lennox
—	FW	SCO	Harry Hood
—	FW	SCO	Kenny Dalglish
—	FW	SCO	Dixie Deans
—	FW	SCO	Paul Wilson
—	FW	SCO	Jimmy Bone
—	FW	SCO	Andy Ritchie
—	FW	ENG	Steve Hancock

== Competitions ==
=== Scottish Division One ===
==== League table ====
Scottish Division One
- Season: 1973–74
- Champions: Celtic; 29th title
- Relegated: East Fife; Falkirk

The 1973–74 Scottish Division One was won by Celtic by four points over nearest rival Hibernian. East Fife and Falkirk finished 17th and 18th respectively and were relegated to the 1974–75 Second Division.

This was Celtic's ninth title in a row, a record that would be equalled by Rangers in the 1996–97 season and again by Celtic themselves in 2019–20.

== Table ==
Pos	Team	Pld	W	D	L	GF	GA	GD	Pts	Qualification or relegation
1	Celtic	34	23	7	4	82	27	+55	53	Champion
2	Hibernian	34	20	9	5	75	42	+33	49	
3	Rangers	34	21	6	7	67	34	+33	48	
4	Aberdeen	34	13	16	5	46	26	+20	42	
5	Dundee	34	16	7	11	67	48	+19	39	
6	Heart of Midlothian	34	14	10	10	54	43	+11	38	
7	Ayr United	34	15	8	11	44	40	+4	38	
8	Dundee United	34	15	7	12	55	51	+4	37	1974–75 European Cup Winners' Cup First round
9	Motherwell	34	14	7	13	45	40	+5	35	
10	Dumbarton	34	11	7	16	43	58	−15	29	
11	Partick Thistle	34	9	10	15	33	46	−13	28	
12	St Johnstone	34	9	10	15	41	60	−19	28	
13	Arbroath	34	10	7	17	52	69	−17	27	
14	Morton	34	8	10	16	37	49	−12	26	
15	Clyde	34	8	9	17	29	65	−36	25	
16	Dunfermline Athletic	34	8	8	18	43	65	−22	24	
17	East Fife	34	9	6	19	26	51	−25	24	Relegated to 1974–75 Second Division
18	Falkirk	34	4	14	16	33	58	−25	22	Relegated to 1974–75 Second Division

Source: Soccerbase and League Tables

== Results ==
Home \ Away	ABE	ARB	AYR	CEL	CLY	DUM	DND	DNU	DNF	EFI	FAL	HOM	HIB	MOR	MOT	PAR	RAN	STJ
Aberdeen		2–2	2–1	0–0	1–1	3–0	0–0	3–1	0–0	2–0	6–0	3–1	1–1	0–0	0–0	2–0	1–1	0–1
Arbroath	1–3		1–1	1–2	1–2	2–1	2–4	1–2	3–1	1–2	0–0	2–3	3–2	2–1	0–2	0–3	1–2	3–1
Ayr United	0–0	1–2		0–1	2–2	0–1	4–2	1–1	3–1	1–0	1–0	2–1	1–1	2–1	1–0	1–0	0–1	3–2
Celtic	2–0	1–0	4–0		5–0	3–3	1–2	3–3	6–0	4–2	6–0	1–0	1–1	1–1	2–0	7–0	1–0	3–0
Clyde	1–3	3–2	1–3	0–2		0–3	0–2	1–2	1–0	2–0	0–0	2–0	1–1	0–2	0–3	1–0	0–2	0–1
Dumbarton	0–1	5–2	0–2	0–2	1–1		2–0	1–2	1–0	1–1	1–5	0–1	3–3	1–0	3–0	2–0	0–2	2–1
Dundee	1–1	5–2	2–1	0–1	6–1	2–1		0–1	1–5	0–1	4–0	0–0	1–3	2–1	0–1	4–1	2–3	2–2
Dundee United	0–3	3–1	2–1	0–2	4–0	6–0	1–2		0–1	0–0	2–1	3–3	1–4	4–2	0–1	1–1	1–3	2–0
Dunfermline Athletic	0–0	1–1	0–4	2–3	2–3	3–2	1–5	2–3		0–1	4–0	2–3	2–3	1–1	2–4	1–1	2–2	3–1
East Fife	2–2	0–2	0–1	1–6	1–0	0–1	0–3	0–2	0–1		1–2	0–0	0–3	0–1	1–0	2–1	0–3	1–2
Falkirk	1–3	2–2	1–1	1–1	3–0	2–3	3–3	0–1	0–1	1–1		0–2	0–0	1–1	1–1	0–0	0–0	1–1
Heart of Midlothian	0–0	4–0	0–1	1–3	0–0	0–0	2–2	1–1	3–0	2–2	2–1		4–1	0–2	2–0	3–1	2–4	0–2
Hibernian	3–1	2–1	4–2	2–4	5–0	3–0	2–1	3–1	1–1	2–1	2–0	3–1		5–0	1–0	2–1	3–1	3–3
Morton	2–0	1–1	1–2	0–0	2–2	3–1	0–1	0–2	1–2	1–0	0–3	2–3	0–3		4–3	0–0	2–3	1–1
Motherwell	0–0	3–4	2–0	3–2	0–0	2–0	2–2	4–0	1–0	3–1	2–1	2–2	1–1	1–0		1–2	1–4	0–1
Partick Thistle	2–0	2–3	3–0	2–0	1–3	0–0	1–0	2–1	1–1	0–1	2–2	1–3	1–0	0–0	1–0		0–1	0–1
Rangers	1–1	2–3	0–0	0–1	4–0	3–1	1–2	3–1	3–0	0–1	2–1	0–3	4–0	1–0	2–1	1–1		5–1
St Johnstone	1–2	0–0	1–1	2–1	1–1	3–3	1–4	1–1	3–1	1–3	2–0	0–2	0–2	1–4	0–1	2–2	1–3	

Legend: Blue = home team win; Yellow = draw; Red = away team win.

==== Matches ====
1 September 1973 Division One	Dunfermline Athletic	2–3	Celtic	Dunfermline
15:00				Stadium: East End Park; Attendance: 14,705

8 September 1973 Division One	Celtic	5–0	Clyde	Glasgow
15:00				Stadium: Celtic Park; Attendance: 23,832

15 September 1974 Division One	Rangers	0–1	Celtic	Glasgow
15:00				Stadium: Ibrox Park; Attendance: 69,495

29 September 1973 Division One	St Johnstone	2–1	Celtic	Perth
15:00				Stadium: Muirton Park; Attendance: 10,390

6 October 1973 Division One	Celtic	2–0	Motherwell	Glasgow
15:00 BST				Stadium: Celtic Park; Attendance: 30,779

13 October 1973 Division One	Dundee	0–1	Celtic	Dundee
15:00 BST				Stadium: Dens Park; Attendance: 17,434

20 October 1973 Division One	Celtic	1–1	Hibernian	Glasgow
15:00 BST				Stadium: Celtic Park; Attendance: 32,351

27 October 1973 Division One	Hearts	1–3	Celtic	Edinburgh
15:00 BST				Stadium: Tynecastle Park; Attendance: 32,001

3 November 1973 Division One	Celtic	4–2	East Fife	Glasgow
15:00 BST				Stadium: Celtic Park; Attendance: 21,811

10 November 1973 Division One	Ayr United	0–1	Celtic	Ayr
15:00 BST				Stadium: Somerset Park; Attendance: 14,428

17 November 1973 Division One	Celtic	7–0	Partick Thistle	Glasgow
15:00 GMT				Stadium: Celtic Park; Attendance: 21,329

24 November 1973 Division One	Dumbarton	0–2	Celtic	Dumbarton
14:15 GMT				Stadium: Boghead Park; Attendance: 11,199

1 December 1973 Division One	Arbroath	1–2	Celtic	Arbroath
14:15 GMT				Stadium: Gayfield Park; Attendance: 5,708

8 December 1973 Division One	Celtic	3–3	Dundee United	Glasgow
14:15 GMT				Stadium: Celtic Park; Attendance: 17,314

22 December 1973 Division One	Celtic	6–0	Falkirk	Glasgow
14:00 GMT				Stadium: Celtic Park; Attendance: 10,339

29 December 1973 Division One	Celtic	6–0	Dunfermline Athletic	Glasgow
14:00 GMT				Stadium: Celtic Park; Attendance: 20,603

1 January 1974 Division One	Clyde	0–2	Celtic	Glasgow
15:00? GMT				Stadium: Celtic Park; Attendance: 10,630

5 January 1974 Division One	Celtic	1–0	Rangers	Glasgow
14:00 GMT				Stadium: Celtic Park; Attendance: 54,120

19 January 1974 Division One	Celtic	3–0	St Johnstone	Glasgow
14:15 GMT				Stadium: Celtic Park; Attendance: 18,129

2 February 1974 Division One	Motherwell	3–2	Celtic	Motherwell
15:00 GMT				Stadium: Fir Park; Attendance: 16,669

10 February 1974 Division One	Celtic	1–2	Dundee	Glasgow
15:00 GMT				Stadium: Celtic Park; Attendance: 38,734

23 February 1974 Division One	Hibernian	2–4	Celtic	Edinburgh
15:00 GMT				Stadium: Easter Road; Attendance: 48,554

2 March 1974 Division One	Celtic	1–0	Hearts	Glasgow
15:00 GMT				Stadium: Celtic Park; Attendance: 31,706

16 March 1974 Division One	Celtic	4–0	Ayr United	Glasgow
15:00 GMT				Stadium: Celtic Park; Attendance: 25,204

23 March 1974 Division One	Partick Thistle	2–0	Celtic	Glasgow
15:00 GMT				Stadium: Firhill Park; Attendance: 23,942

30 March 1974 Division One	Celtic	3–3	Dumbarton	Glasgow
15:00 GMT				Stadium: Celtic Park; Attendance: 17,950

6 April 1974 Division One	Celtic	1–0	Arbroath	Glasgow
15:00 GMT				Stadium: Celtic Park; Attendance: 17,840

13 April 1974 Division One	Dundee United	0–2	Celtic	Dundee
15:00 GMT				Stadium: Tannadice Park; Attendance: 18,711

17 April 1974 Division One	East Fife	1–6	Celtic	Methil
19:30 GMT				Stadium: Bayview Park; Attendance: 6,970

20 April 1974 Division One	Celtic	2–0	Aberdeen	Glasgow
15:00 GMT				Stadium: Celtic Park; Attendance: 30,740

27 April 1974 Division One	Falkirk	1–1	Celtic	Falkirk
15:00 BST				Stadium: Brockville Park; Attendance: 7,797

29 April 1974 Division One	Aberdeen	0–0	Celtic	Aberdeen
19:30 BST				Stadium: Pittodrie Stadium; Attendance: 7,563

30 April 1974 Division One	Celtic	1–1	Morton	Glasgow
19:30 BST				Stadium: Celtic Park; Attendance: 8,176

6 May 1974 Division One	Morton	0–0	Celtic	Greenock
19:30 BST				Stadium: Cappielow Park; Attendance: 5,080

=== Scottish Cup ===
27 January 1974 Third round	Celtic	6–1	Clydebank	Glasgow
14:30 GMT				Stadium: Celtic Park; Attendance: 28,000

17 February 1974 Fourth round	Celtic	6–1	Stirling Albion	Glasgow
15:00 GMT				Stadium: Celtic Park; Attendance: 20,330

10 March 1974 Fifth round	Celtic	2–2	Motherwell	Glasgow
15:00 GMT				Stadium: Celtic Park; Attendance: 46,000

10 March 1974 Fifth round replay	Motherwell	0–1	Celtic	Motherwell
19:30 GMT				Stadium: Fir Park; Attendance: 24,875

3 April 1974 Semi-final	Celtic	1–0	Dundee	Glasgow
19:30 GMT				Stadium: Hampden Park; Attendance: 58,271

4 May 1974 Final	Celtic	3–0	Dundee United	Glasgow
15:00 GMT				Stadium: Hampden Park; Attendance: 75,959

=== Scottish League Cup ===
11 August 1973 Group 1	Celtic	2–1	Arbroath	Glasgow
15:00 GMT				Stadium: Celtic Park; Attendance: 17,906

15 August 1973 Group 1	Falkirk	0–2	Celtic	Falkirk
19:30 GMT				Stadium: Brockville Park; Attendance: 9,255

18 August 1973 Group 1	Rangers	1–2	Celtic	Glasgow
15:00 GMT				Stadium: Ibrox Park; Attendance: 66,830

22 August 1973 Group 1	Celtic	2–1	Falkirk	Glasgow
19:30 GMT				Stadium: Celtic Park; Attendance: 14,478

25 August 1973 Group 1	Celtic	1–3	Rangers	Glasgow
15:00 GMT				Stadium: Celtic Park; Attendance: 56,511

29 August 1973 Group 1	Arbroath	1–3	Celtic	Arbroath
19:30 GMT				Stadium: Gayfield Park; Attendance: 5,101

12 September 1973 Second round 1st leg	Motherwell	1–2	Celtic	Motherwell
19:30 GMT				Stadium: Fir Park; Attendance: 20,094

10 October 1973 Second round 2nd leg	Celtic	0–1 (2–2 agg.)	Motherwell	Glasgow
19:30 GMT				Stadium: Celtic Park; Attendance: 23,631

29 October 1973 Second round replay	Celtic	3–2	Motherwell	Glasgow
19:30 GMT				Stadium: Celtic Park; Attendance: 26,000

31 October 1973 Quarter-final 1st leg	Celtic	3–2	Aberdeen	Glasgow
19:30 GMT				Stadium: Celtic Park; Attendance: 28,000

21 November 1973 Quarter-final 2nd leg	Aberdeen	0–0 (2–3 agg.)	Celtic	Aberdeen
13:30 GMT				Stadium: Pittodrie Stadium; Attendance: 28,000

5 December 1973 Semi-final	Rangers	1–3	Celtic	Glasgow
19:30 GMT				Stadium: Hampden Park; Attendance: 54,966

15 December 1973 Final	Dundee	1–0	Celtic	Glasgow
13:30 GMT				Stadium: Hampden Park; Attendance: 28,058

=== European Cup ===
19 September 1973 1st round 1st leg	TPS Turku (Finland)	1–6	(Scotland) Celtic	Turku
20:00 GMT				Stadium: Veritas Stadion; Attendance: 3,143

3 October 1973 1st round 2nd leg	Celtic (Scotland)	3–0 (9–1 agg.)	(Finland) TPS Turku	Glasgow
19:00 GMT				Stadium: Celtic Park; Attendance: 19,969

24 October 1973 2nd round 1st leg	Celtic (Scotland)	0–0	(Denmark) Vejle BK	Glasgow
19:00 GMT				Stadium: Celtic Park; Attendance: 30,000

6 November 1973 2nd round 2nd leg	Vejle BK (Denmark)	0–1 (0–1 agg.)	(Scotland) Celtic	Vejle
18:30 GMT				Stadium: Vejle Stadion; Attendance: 18,600

27 February 1974 Quarter-final 1st leg	Basel (Switzerland)	3–2	(Scotland) Celtic	Basel
19:00 GMT				Stadium: St. Jakob Stadium; Attendance: 25,000

20 March 1974 Quarter-final 2nd leg	Celtic (Scotland)	4–2 (6–5 agg.)	(Switzerland) Basel	Glasgow
19:00 GMT				Stadium: Celtic Park; Attendance: 71,000

10 April 1974 Semi-final 1st leg	Celtic (Scotland)	0–0	(Spain) Atlético Madrid	Glasgow
20:00 GMT				Stadium: Celtic Park; Attendance: 72,461

24 April 1974 Semi-final 2nd leg	Atlético Madrid (Spain)	2–0 (2–0 agg.)	(Scotland) Celtic	Madrid
19:00 GMT				Stadium: Vicente Calderón Stadium; Attendance: 64,000

=== Drybrough Cup ===
29 July 1973 First round	Celtic	6–1	Dunfermline Athletic	Glasgow
15:00 BST				Stadium: Celtic Park; Attendance: 27,000

31 July 1973 Semi-final	Celtic	4–0	Dundee	Glasgow
19:30 BST				Stadium: Celtic Park; Attendance: 26,000

4 August 1973 Final	Celtic	0–1 (aet)	Hibernian	Glasgow
15:00 BST				Stadium: Hampden Park; Attendance: 49,204

== See also ==
- Nine in a row
