= 1973–74 in Scottish football =

Division One champions
- Celtic

Division Two champions
- Airdrieonians

Scottish Cup winners
- Celtic

League Cup winners
- Dundee

Junior Cup winners
- Cambuslang Rangers

Teams in Europe
- Aberdeen, Celtic, Dundee, Hibernian, Rangers

Scotland national team
- 1974 BHC, 1974 World Cup qualification, 1974 World Cup

The 1973–74 season was the 101st season of competitive football in Scotland and the 77th season of Scottish league football.

== Scottish League Division One ==
Scottish Division One
- Season: 1973–74
- Champions: Celtic; 29th title
- Relegated: East Fife; Falkirk

The 1973–74 Scottish Division One was won by Celtic by four points over nearest rival Hibernian. East Fife and Falkirk finished 17th and 18th respectively and were relegated to the 1974–75 Second Division.

This was Celtic's ninth title in a row, a record that would be equalled by Rangers in the 1996–97 season and again by Celtic themselves in 2019–20.

== Table ==
Pos	Team	Pld	W	D	L	GF	GA	GD	Pts	Qualification or relegation
1	Celtic	34	23	7	4	82	27	+55	53	Champion
2	Hibernian	34	20	9	5	75	42	+33	49	
3	Rangers	34	21	6	7	67	34	+33	48	
4	Aberdeen	34	13	16	5	46	26	+20	42	
5	Dundee	34	16	7	11	67	48	+19	39	
6	Heart of Midlothian	34	14	10	10	54	43	+11	38	
7	Ayr United	34	15	8	11	44	40	+4	38	
8	Dundee United	34	15	7	12	55	51	+4	37	1974–75 European Cup Winners' Cup First round
9	Motherwell	34	14	7	13	45	40	+5	35	
10	Dumbarton	34	11	7	16	43	58	−15	29	
11	Partick Thistle	34	9	10	15	33	46	−13	28	
12	St Johnstone	34	9	10	15	41	60	−19	28	
13	Arbroath	34	10	7	17	52	69	−17	27	
14	Morton	34	8	10	16	37	49	−12	26	
15	Clyde	34	8	9	17	29	65	−36	25	
16	Dunfermline Athletic	34	8	8	18	43	65	−22	24	
17	East Fife	34	9	6	19	26	51	−25	24	Relegated to 1974–75 Second Division
18	Falkirk	34	4	14	16	33	58	−25	22	Relegated to 1974–75 Second Division

Source: Soccerbase and League Tables

== Results ==
Home \ Away	ABE	ARB	AYR	CEL	CLY	DUM	DND	DNU	DNF	EFI	FAL	HOM	HIB	MOR	MOT	PAR	RAN	STJ
Aberdeen		2–2	2–1	0–0	1–1	3–0	0–0	3–1	0–0	2–0	6–0	3–1	1–1	0–0	0–0	2–0	1–1	0–1
Arbroath	1–3		1–1	1–2	1–2	2–1	2–4	1–2	3–1	1–2	0–0	2–3	3–2	2–1	0–2	0–3	1–2	3–1
Ayr United	0–0	1–2		0–1	2–2	0–1	4–2	1–1	3–1	1–0	1–0	2–1	1–1	2–1	1–0	1–0	0–1	3–2
Celtic	2–0	1–0	4–0		5–0	3–3	1–2	3–3	6–0	4–2	6–0	1–0	1–1	1–1	2–0	7–0	1–0	3–0
Clyde	1–3	3–2	1–3	0–2		0–3	0–2	1–2	1–0	2–0	0–0	2–0	1–1	0–2	0–3	1–0	0–2	0–1
Dumbarton	0–1	5–2	0–2	0–2	1–1		2–0	1–2	1–0	1–1	1–5	0–1	3–3	1–0	3–0	2–0	0–2	2–1
Dundee	1–1	5–2	2–1	0–1	6–1	2–1		0–1	1–5	0–1	4–0	0–0	1–3	2–1	0–1	4–1	2–3	2–2
Dundee United	0–3	3–1	2–1	0–2	4–0	6–0	1–2		0–1	0–0	2–1	3–3	1–4	4–2	0–1	1–1	1–3	2–0
Dunfermline Athletic	0–0	1–1	0–4	2–3	2–3	3–2	1–5	2–3		0–1	4–0	2–3	2–3	1–1	2–4	1–1	2–2	3–1
East Fife	2–2	0–2	0–1	1–6	1–0	0–1	0–3	0–2	0–1		1–2	0–0	0–3	0–1	1–0	2–1	0–3	1–2
Falkirk	1–3	2–2	1–1	1–1	3–0	2–3	3–3	0–1	0–1	1–1		0–2	0–0	1–1	1–1	0–0	0–0	1–1
Heart of Midlothian	0–0	4–0	0–1	1–3	0–0	0–0	2–2	1–1	3–0	2–2	2–1		4–1	0–2	2–0	3–1	2–4	0–2
Hibernian	3–1	2–1	4–2	2–4	5–0	3–0	2–1	3–1	1–1	2–1	2–0	3–1		5–0	1–0	2–1	3–1	3–3
Morton	2–0	1–1	1–2	0–0	2–2	3–1	0–1	0–2	1–2	1–0	0–3	2–3	0–3		4–3	0–0	2–3	1–1
Motherwell	0–0	3–4	2–0	3–2	0–0	2–0	2–2	4–0	1–0	3–1	2–1	2–2	1–1	1–0		1–2	1–4	0–1
Partick Thistle	2–0	2–3	3–0	2–0	1–3	0–0	1–0	2–1	1–1	0–1	2–2	1–3	1–0	0–0	1–0		0–1	0–1
Rangers	1–1	2–3	0–0	0–1	4–0	3–1	1–2	3–1	3–0	0–1	2–1	0–3	4–0	1–0	2–1	1–1		5–1
St Johnstone	1–2	0–0	1–1	2–1	1–1	3–3	1–4	1–1	3–1	1–3	2–0	0–2	0–2	1–4	0–1	2–2	1–3	

Legend: Blue = home team win; Yellow = draw; Red = away team win.

Champions: Celtic
Relegated: East Fife, Falkirk

== Scottish League Division Two ==
Pos	Team	Pld	W	D	L	GF	GA	GD	Pts	Promotion or relegation
1	Airdrieonians	36	28	4	4	102	25	+77	60	Promotion to the 1974–75 First Division
2	Kilmarnock	36	26	6	4	96	44	+52	58	Promotion to the 1974–75 First Division
3	Hamilton Academical	36	24	7	5	68	38	+30	55	
4	Queen of the South	36	20	7	9	73	41	+32	47	
5	Berwick Rangers	36	16	13	7	53	35	+18	45	
6	Raith Rovers	36	18	9	9	69	48	+21	45	
7	Stirling Albion	36	17	6	13	76	50	+26	40	
8	Montrose	36	15	7	14	71	64	+7	37	
9	Stranraer	36	14	8	14	64	70	−6	36	
10	Clydebank	36	13	8	15	47	48	−1	34	
11	St Mirren	36	12	10	14	62	66	−4	34	
12	Alloa Athletic	36	15	4	17	47	58	−11	34	
13	Cowdenbeath	36	11	9	16	59	85	−26	31	
14	Queen's Park	36	12	4	20	42	64	−22	28	
15	Stenhousemuir	36	11	5	20	44	59	−15	27	
16	East Stirlingshire	36	9	5	22	47	73	−26	23	
17	Albion Rovers	36	7	6	23	38	72	−34	20	
18	Forfar Athletic	36	5	6	25	42	94	−52	16	
19	Brechin City	36	5	4	27	33	99	−66	14	

Source: "1973-1974 Second Division - SPFL Archive". SPFL.

Promoted: Airdrieonians, Kilmarnock

== Cup honours ==
Competition	Winner	Score	Runner-up
Scottish Cup 1973–74	Celtic	3 – 0	Dundee United
League Cup 1973–74	Dundee	1 – 0	Celtic
Junior Cup	Cambuslang Rangers	3 – 1	Linlithgow Rose

== Other honours ==
=== National ===
Competition	Winner	Score	Runner-up
Scottish Qualifying Cup – North	Clachnacuddin	2 – 1 *	Inverness Thistle
Scottish Qualifying Cup – South	Selkirk	4 – 2 *	St Cuthbert Wanderers

=== County ===
Competition	Winner	Score	Runner-up
Aberdeenshire Cup	Keith		
Ayrshire Cup	Kilmarnock	1 – 1 †	Ayr United
East of Scotland Shield	Hearts	3 – 0	Berwick Rangers
Fife Cup	Dunfermline Athletic	3 – 2 *	Cowdenbeath
Lanarkshire Cup	Albion Rovers		Motherwell
Renfrewshire Cup	St Mirren	3 – 1 *	Morton
Stirlingshire Cup	Stirling Albion	2 – 2 †	Dumbarton

^{*} – aggregate over two legs
† – won on penalties

=== Highland League ===
Top Three
Pos	Team	Pld	W	D	L	GF	GA	GD	Pts
1	Elgin City	30	19	7	4	71	30	+41	45
2	Inverness Thistle	30	14	12	4	66	39	+27	40
3	Fraserburgh	30	16	7	7	72	43	+29	39

== Individual honours ==
Award	Winner	Club
Footballer of the Year	Scotland World Cup squad	—

== Scotland national team ==
Date	Venue	Opponents	Score	Competition	Scotland scorer(s)
26 September	Hampden Park, Glasgow (H)	Czechoslovakia	2–1	WCQG8	Jim Holton, Joe Jordan
17 October	Tehelné pole, Bratislava (A)	Czechoslovakia	0–1	WCQG8	
14 November	Hampden Park, Glasgow (H)	West Germany	1–1	Friendly	Jim Holton
27 March	Waldstadion, Frankfurt (A)	West Germany	1–2	Friendly	Kenny Dalglish
11 May	Hampden Park, Glasgow (H)	Northern Ireland	0–1	BHC	
14 May	Hampden Park, Glasgow (H)	Wales	2–0	BHC	Kenny Dalglish, Sandy Jardine (pen.)
18 May	Hampden Park, Glasgow (H)	England	2–0	BHC	Joe Jordan, own goal
1 June	Klokke Stadion, Bruges (A)	Belgium	1–2	Friendly	Jimmy Johnstone
6 June	Ullevaal Stadion, Oslo (A)	Norway	2–1	Friendly	Joe Jordan, Kenny Dalglish
14 June	Westfalenstadion, Dortmund (N)	Zaire	2–0	WCG2	Peter Lorimer, Joe Jordan
18 June	Waldstadion, Frankfurt (N)	Brazil	0–0	WCG2	
22 June	Waldstadion, Frankfurt (N)	Yugoslavia	1–1	WCG2	Joe Jordan

1974 British Home Championship – Joint Winners with England

Key:

- (H) = Home match
- (A) = Away match
- WCQG8 = World Cup qualifying – Group 8
- WCG2 = World Cup – Group 2
- BHC = British Home Championship
