= 1973–74 Heart of Midlothian F.C. season =

Heart of Midlothian
1973–74 season
- Manager: Bobby Seith
- Stadium: Tynecastle Park
- Scottish First Division: 8th
- Scottish Cup: Semi-finalists
- League Cup: Group Stage
- Texaco Cup: Quarter-finalists

During the 1973–74 season, Heart of Midlothian F.C. competed in the Scottish First Division, the Scottish Cup, the Scottish League Cup, the Texaco Cup and the East of Scotland Shield.

== Squad ==
Note: Flags indicate national team as defined under FIFA eligibility rules; some limited exceptions apply. Players may hold more than one non-FIFA nationality.

No.	Pos.	Nation	Player
—	GK	SCO	Jim Cruickshank
—	GK	SCO	Kenny Garland
—	GK	SCO	David Graham
—	DF	SCO	Jim Jefferies
—	DF	SCO	Roy Kay
—	DF	SCO	David Clunie
—	DF	SCO	Jim Brown
—	DF	SCO	Alan Anderson
—	DF	SCO	Ian Sneddon
—	DF	SCO	Peter Oliver
—	DF	SCO	Arthur Thomson
—	DF	SCO	John Gallacher
—	DF	SCO	Jim Jefferies

No.	Pos.	Nation	Player
—	MF	SCO	Tommy Murray
—	MF	SCO	Donald Park
—	MF	AUS	Jimmy Cant
—	MF	SCO	Kenny Aird
—	MF	SCO	Ralph Callachan
—	MF	AUS	John Stevenson
—	FW	SCO	Drew Busby
—	FW	SCO	Donald Ford
—	FW	SCO	Eric Carruthers
—	FW	SCO	Harry Kinnear
—	FW	SCO	Bobby Prentice
—	FW	SCO	Willie Gibson

== Fixtures ==
=== Friendlies ===
4 August 1973 Friendly	Hearts	1–0	Sparta Rotterdam	Tynecastle Park
	Goal

29 October 1973 Friendly	Queen's Park	1–5	Hearts	Hampden Park
	Goal

=== East of Scotland Shield ===
8 May 1974 Semi-Final	Hearts	2–1	Berwick Rangers	Tynecastle Park

=== Texaco Cup ===
18 September 1973 Texaco Cup 1st Round 1st Leg	Everton	0–1	Hearts	Goodison Park
			Goal

3 October 1973 Texaco Cup 1st Round 2nd Leg	Hearts	0–0	Everton	Tynecastle Park
			Goal

24 October 1973 Texaco Cup Quarter-Final 1st Leg	Hearts	0–1	Burnley	Tynecastle Park
			Goal

6 November 1973 Texaco Cup Quarter-Final 2nd Leg	Burnley	5–0	Hearts	Turf Moor
			Goal

=== League Cup ===
11 August 1973 League Cup Group	Hearts	2–0	Partick Thistle	Tynecastle Park
				Attendance: 9,674

15 August 1973 League Cup Group	St Johnstone	2–1	Hearts	Muirton Park
				Attendance: 4,952

18 August 1973 League Cup Group	Dundee	2–1	Hearts	Dens Park
				Attendance: 8,052

22 August 1973 League Cup Group	Hearts	4–1	St Johnstone	Tynecastle Park
				Attendance: 7,000

25 August 1973 League Cup Group	Hearts	0–0	Dundee	Tynecastle Park
				Attendance: 13,414

29 August 1973 League Cup Group	Partick Thistle	0–0	Hearts	Firhill Park
				Attendance: 4,996

=== Scottish Cup ===
26 January 1974 Scottish Cup R3	Hearts	3–1	Clyde	Tynecastle Park
				Attendance: 9,139

16 February 1974 Scottish Cup R4	Hearts	1–1	Partick Thistle	Tynecastle Park
				Attendance: 11,727

19 February 1974 Scottish Cup R4 Replay	Partick Thistle	1–4	Hearts	Firhill Park
				Attendance: 9,652

9 March 1974 Scottish Cup R5	Hearts	1–1	Ayr United	Tynecastle Park
				Attendance: 17,219

13 March 1974 Scottish Cup R5 Replay	Ayr United	1–2	Hearts	Somerset Park
				Attendance: 16,185

6 April 1974 Scottish Cup Semi-Final	Hearts	1–1	Dundee United	Hampden Park
				Attendance: 22,725

9 April 1974 Scottish Cup Semi-Final Replay	Dundee United	4–2	Hearts	Hampden Park
				Attendance: 12,960

=== Scottish First Division ===
1 September 1973 Scottish First Division	Morton	2–3	Hearts	Cappielow Park
				Attendance: 3,360

8 September 1973 Scottish First Division	Hearts	4–1	Hibernian	Tynecastle Park
				Attendance: 28,946

15 September 1973 Scottish First Division	Motherwell	2–2	Hearts	Fir Park
				Attendance: 9,815

22 September 1973 Scottish First Division	Hearts	2–2	Dundee	Tynecastle Park
				Attendance: 13,348

29 September 1973 Scottish First Division	Rangers	0–3	Hearts	Ibrox Park
				Attendance: 34,654

6 October 1973 Scottish First Division	Hearts	3–0	Dunfermline Athletic	Tynecastle Park
				Attendance: 14,826

13 October 1973 Scottish First Division	St Johnstone	0–2	Hearts	Muirton Park
				Attendance: 6,996

20 October 1973 Scottish First Division	Hearts	0–0	Dumbarton	Tynecastle Park
				Attendance: 10,255

27 October 1973 Scottish First Division	Hearts	1–3	Celtic	Tynecastle Park
				Attendance: 32,001

3 November 1973 Scottish First Division	Arbroath	2–3	Hearts	Gayfield Park
				Attendance: 4,049

10 November 1973 Scottish First Division	Hearts	1–1	Dundee United	Tynecastle Park
				Attendance: 8,843

17 November 1973 Scottish First Division	Aberdeen	3–1	Hearts	Pittodrie Stadium
				Attendance: 11,959

24 November 1973 Scottish First Division	Hearts	2–1	Falkirk	Tynecastle Park
				Attendance: 6,264

8 December 1973 Scottish First Division	East Fife	0–0	Hearts	Bayview Park
				Attendance: 3,785

15 December 1973 Scottish First Division	Hearts	0–1	Ayr United	Tynecastle Park
				Attendance: 4,693

22 December 1973 Scottish First Division	Partick Thistle	1–3	Hearts	Firhill Park
				Attendance: 3,313

29 December 1973 Scottish First Division	Hearts	0–2	Morton	Tynecastle Park
				Attendance: 6,878

1 January 1974 Scottish First Division	Hibernian	3–1	Hearts	Easter Road
				Attendance: 35,393

5 January 1974 Scottish First Division	Hearts	2–0	Motherwell	Tynecastle Park
				Attendance: 8,772

19 January 1974 Scottish First Division	Hearts	2–4	Rangers	Tynecastle Park
				Attendance: 19,621

9 February 1974 Scottish First Division	Hearts	0–2	St Johnstone	Tynecastle Park
				Attendance: 9,078

23 February 1974 Scottish First Division	Dumbarton	0–2	Hearts	Boghead Park
				Attendance: 5,127

2 March 1974 Scottish First Division	Celtic	1–0	Hearts	Celtic Park
				Attendance: 31,706

16 March 1974 Scottish First Division	Dundee United	3–3	Hearts	Tannadice Park
				Attendance: 6,748

23 March 1974 Scottish First Division	Hearts	0–0	Aberdeen	Tynecastle Park
				Attendance: 11,878

30 March 1974 Scottish First Division	Falkirk	0–2	Hearts	Brockville Park
				Attendance: 5,128

2 April 1974 Scottish First Division	Hearts	4–0	Arbroath	Tynecastle Park
				Attendance: 6,847

13 April 1974 Scottish First Division	Hearts	2–2	East Fife	Tynecastle Park
				Attendance: 5,963

17 April 1974 Scottish First Division	Dunfermline Athletic	2–3	Hearts	Tynecastle Park
				Attendance: 6,332

20 April 1974 Scottish First Division	Ayr United	2–1	Hearts	Somerset Park
				Attendance: 4,355

24 April 1974 Scottish First Division	Clyde	2–0	Hearts	Shawfield Stadium
				Attendance: 1,315

27 April 1974 Scottish First Division	Hearts	3–1	Partick Thistle	Tynecastle Park
				Attendance: 4,903

4 May 1974 Scottish First Division	Hearts	0–0	Clyde	Tynecastle Park
				Attendance: 5,341

6 May 1974 Scottish First Division	Dundee	0–0	Heart of Midlothian	Dens Park
				Attendance: 5,056

== See also ==
- List of Heart of Midlothian F.C. seasons
