= Jackie Hood =

Scottish footballer

Personal information
- Full name: John O'Dorman Hood
- Date of birth: 8 January 1938 (age 88)
- Place of birth: Glasgow, Scotland
- Position: Centre forward

Youth career
- Shettleston

Senior career*
| Years | Team | Apps | (Gls) |
| 1956–1959 | Everton | 0 | (0) |
| 1959–1960 | Tranmere Rovers | 3 | (2) |
| 1960–1961 | East Fife | 11 | (4) |
- St. Roch's
| Total | | 14 | (6) |
- * Club domestic league appearances and goals

John O'Dorman 'Jackie' Hood (born 8 January 1938) is a Scottish retired footballer who played as a centre forward in the Football League for Tranmere Rovers. He had previously been contracted to Everton, and won the Liverpool Senior Cup with their reserve team in 1957.

He is the older brother of former Celtic forward Harry Hood.
