= Nine in a row =

Scottish football achievement

In Scottish football, the term nine in a row refers to winning the league championship in nine consecutive years. This has been accomplished twice by Celtic and once by Rangers. It has become a commonly used phrase, and a topic which has drawn much attention, as has the goal of winning ten in a row.

Scottish football has been dominated by two clubs, Celtic and Rangers, both based in Glasgow and collectively known as the Old Firm, since the introduction of a national league system in 1890. While many league seasons have been closely fought between the pair, and have sometimes involved other clubs, there have been periods of dominance by one club, with three cases of nine championship wins in succession since the 1970s.

The feat was first achieved by Celtic between the 1965–66 and 1973–74 seasons, during which they also became European champions in 1967. Their run was eventually stopped in 1975 by Rangers, who later received significant financial investment and matched the achievement between 1988–89 and 1996–97. Celtic won the next title in 1998 and prevented their record being broken. After the two clubs exchanged the trophy regularly for 14 seasons (the same period as had elapsed between the end of the first sequence and the start of the second), Celtic then went on another run of championships from 2011–12 to 2019–20, with Rangers out of the top division for four seasons of that period after their liquidation in 2012, with a new company taking over. This was the only spell in the league's history that either club had not been in the top division. Rangers managed to strengthen sufficiently to 'stop the 10' in 2020–21 with an unbeaten season.

Similar and longer winning runs have been recorded in other countries; (Note: MTK of Hungary won ten consecutive championships (though interrupted by World War I), Bulgarians CSKA Sofia claimed nine in the early 1960s before Celtic did likewise, Rosenborg won the Norwegian title 13 times in succession in the same period as Rangers' run, Italian club Juventus claimed nine consecutive Serie A championships in the same seasons as Celtic's second sequence, Bayern Munich won their tenth Bundesliga in 2021–22, and in that same season Ludogorets won their eleventh Bulgarian title, having previously beaten the national record from CSKA the season before that.) however it is in Scotland that the specific term has become most commonplace, having been part of the nation's football landscape since the 1970s, remaining prominent due to the same mark being achieved twice more – but never bettered – in subsequent generations. Celtic is the only European club to win nine consecutive titles on two occasions, and in no other country has such a total been achieved more than twice (either by a single club or multiple clubs).

== Background: 1890s to 1960s ==
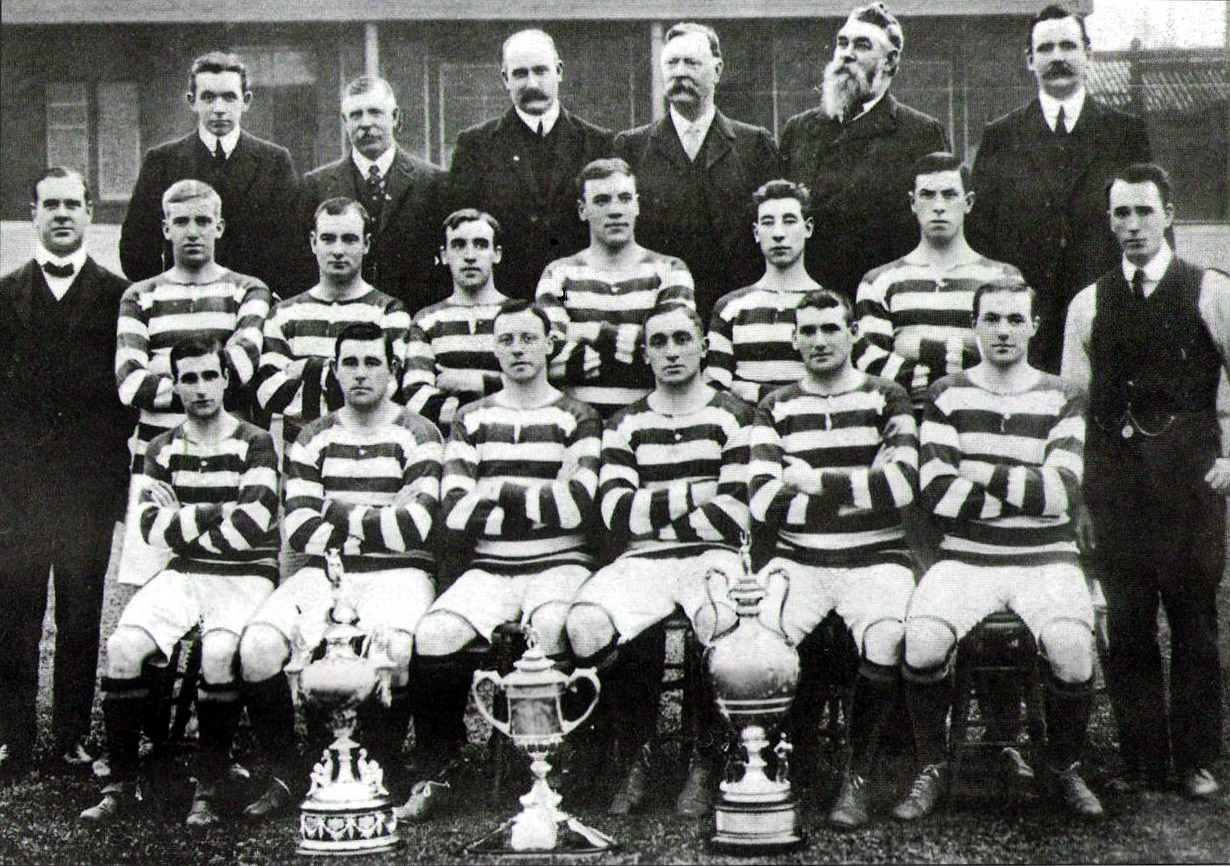
The Celtic team of the 1900s set an early record of six league wins in a row

From the formation of the Scottish Football League in 1890, Celtic and Rangers based in Glasgow were among the dominant clubs along with Edinburgh-based Heart of Midlothian and Hibernian – amateurs Queen's Park, also based in Glasgow who had dominated the Scottish Cup up to that point, declined to enter the new league in its first decade and were never to be a significant force in the future, with their most significant role being to provide their large ground Hampden Park for use as a neutral venue for cup finals (and the home of the Scottish national team). Rangers, founded in 1872, set the standard for SFL performance with a perfect season in 1898–99, winning all 18 league fixtures to eclipse the achievement of Celtic who had gone through the previous campaign unbeaten, but had drawn three matches. However, Rangers were weakened economically from 1902 when a new wooden stand collapsed at their Ibrox Park ground during a Scotland fixture, killing 25 spectators and injuring several hundred and necessitating more investment to rebuild the venue again. After another Glasgow team, Third Lanark, won the league in 1903–04, Celtic – backed by a large following among the Irish immigrant community in the West of Scotland from their formation in 1888 – took the initiative and won six successive championships between 1904–05 and 1909–10, guided by 'secretary-manager' Willie Maley who remained in charge for 40 years. Rangers recovered to win the next three titles, then Celtic won four in succession during the atypical conditions of World War I, when the league took the decision to keep running. That period also saw the start of the Old Firm rivalry between the two clubs, initially on the basis of sporting popularity (the 1909 Scottish Cup Final replay between them at Hampden ended in a riot by supporters of both clubs who suspected the drawn result had been fixed to ensure another lucrative fixture) then along sectarian lines, with Rangers becoming identified as the Protestant and Unionist (both in a Scottish and Irish sense) antithesis of Celtic, whose supporters were largely Catholic and sympathisers of Irish nationalism (and the IRA in some cases), an issue which became more prominent and violent from the 1910s. At the same time a large contingent of Ulstermen, many of them Orange Order members, moved from the Belfast shipyards to work in those of Govan where Rangers were based, attaching their cultural conditions to the club including the exclusion of Catholics from their workplace, a policy unofficially adopted by Rangers for decades to come and further entrenching the position of the two as polar opposites in Glaswegian society (separate schooling systems for the two communities, initially set up amidst an atmosphere of hostility towards the Irish-Catholic immigrant community, meant that the mindset of local children was typically set on which values should be followed, including football affiliation in a society already fixated on the sport, from a young age).

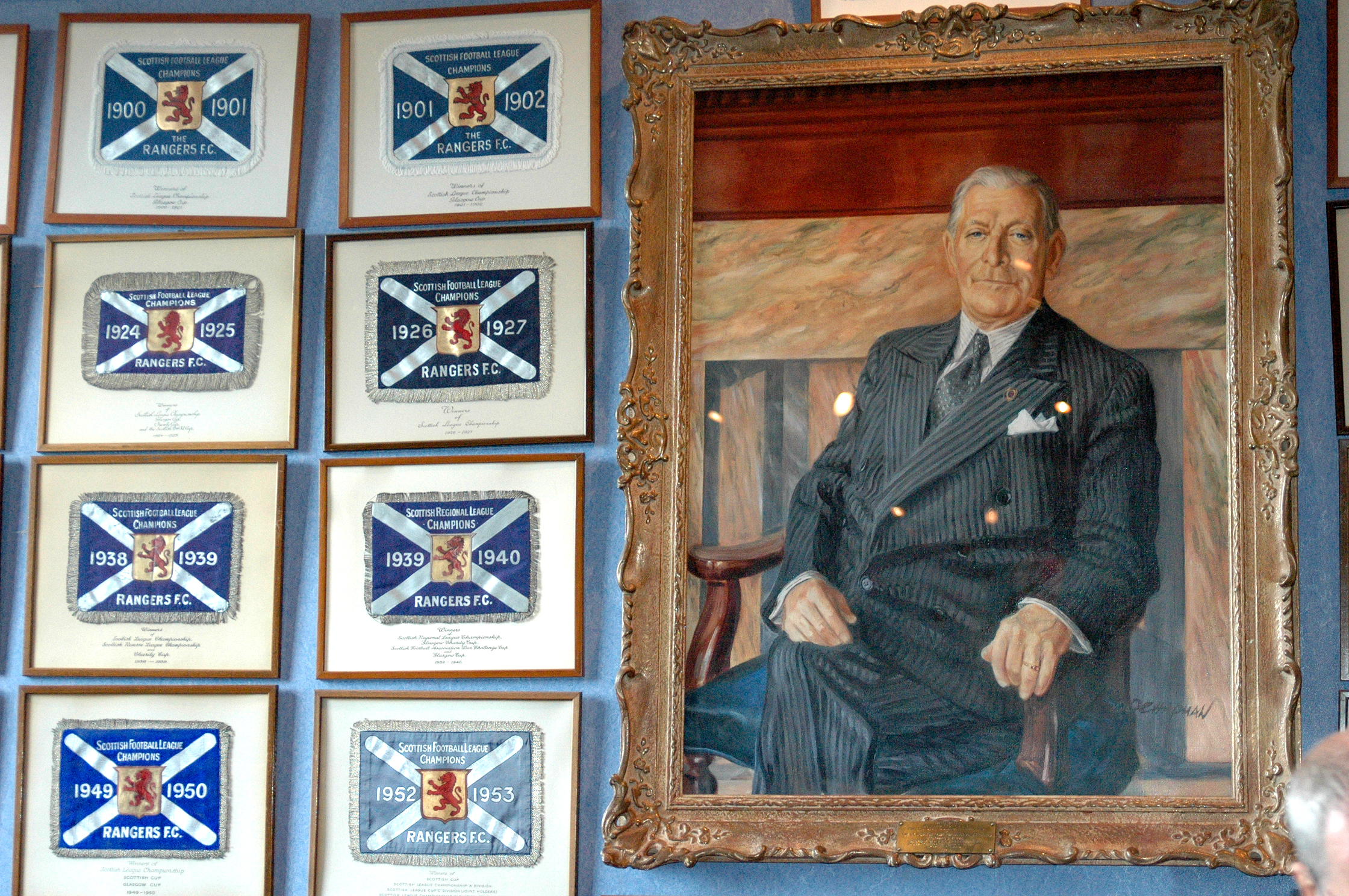
Bill Struth's portrait in the trophy room at Ibrox, hanging beside some of the league championship flags his teams won, including 11 out of 13 between 1922 and 1935.

With Rangers and Celtic each enjoying the support of effectively half of Glasgow and half of Northern Ireland, their financial strength ensured they stayed near the top of the Scottish League almost every year, although in the period between the wars, Rangers under Bill Struth were very much dominant in terms of league success: from 1917–18 to 1938–39 they won 16 of the 22 titles, with occasional challenges from Celtic as well as Airdrieonians (who finished second to Rangers four times) and Motherwell, (also runners-up four times, the only title in their history in 1931–32 broke a run of five by Rangers, who then claimed three more).

The Gers continued to dominate in the unofficial competitions during World War II, winning all seven of the league titles and numerous cups. As they had won the last official championship before the war and also won the first after it, some supporters retrospectively claimed this sequence to be the first run of 'nine in a row'. Celtic won nothing during the period as their business model foundered. When the war ended, it was the Edinburgh clubs who challenged during the 1950s, with first Hibs (3 titles, 3 times runners-up with their Famous Five forward line) then Hearts (2 titles, 3 runners-up) giving chase to Rangers (7 titles including the country's first treble incorporating the new Scottish League Cup, 4 runners-up) and markedly stronger than Celtic (1 title, 1 runner-up) while Aberdeen took a league flag in 1954–55 and the likes of Partick Thistle and East Fife also finished ahead of the Hoops more than once in what was a strong period for Scottish football in general but not for Celtic. That pattern continued into the early 1960s, with Rangers the most consistently strong team, with their achievements including a second treble in 1962–63 and a European Cup Winners' Cup final appearance in 1961, with Celtic providing less of a challenge than other smaller clubs: in this period Dundee – champions in 1961–62 – and particularly Kilmarnock who were second four times before taking the title ahead of Hearts and Dunfermline Athletic in 1964–65, the only occasion when neither of the Old Firm clubs finished in the top three.

== The first Nine: Celtic, 1965 to 1974 ==
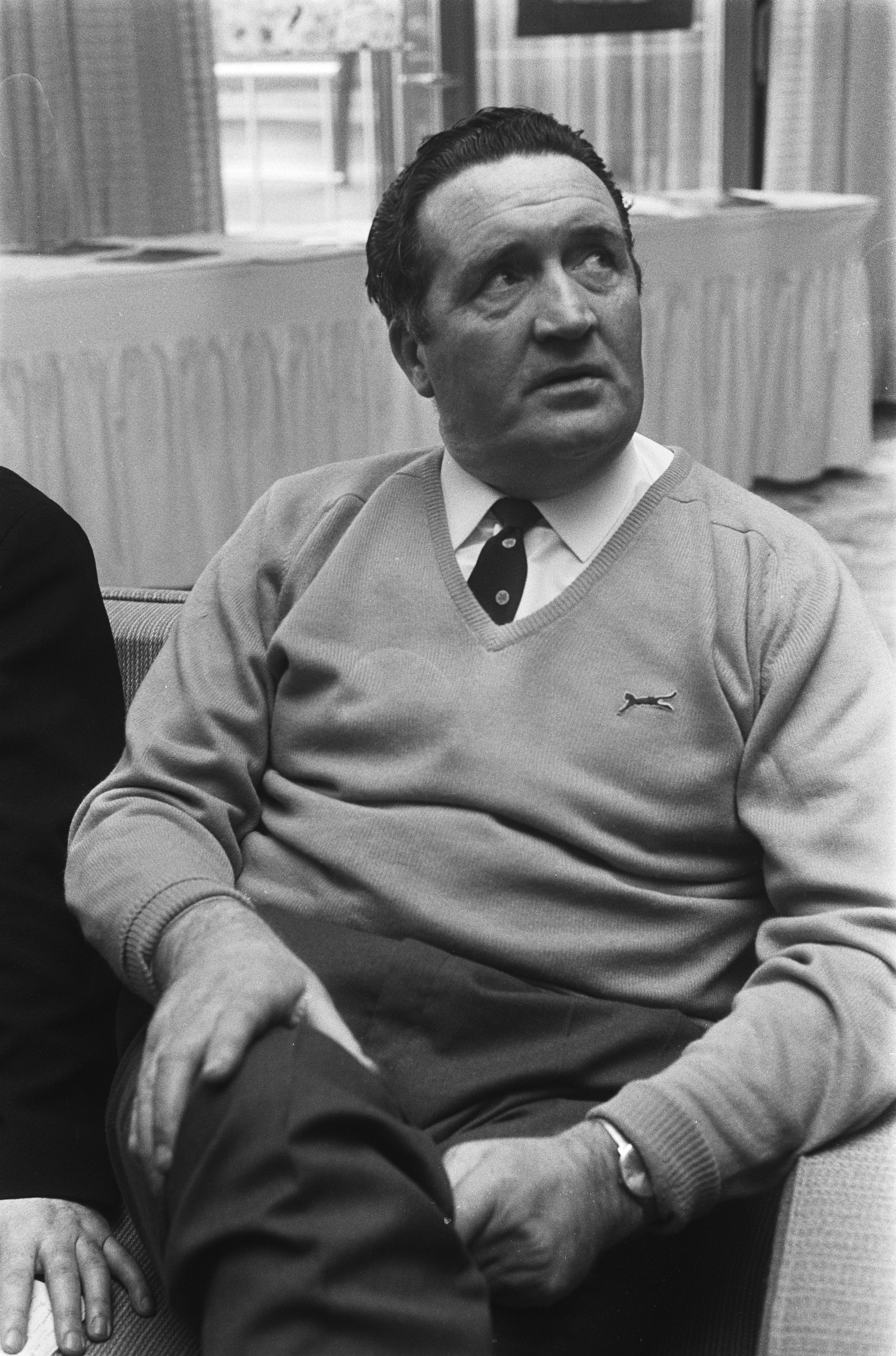
Jock Stein's impact at Celtic was huge, transforming them from underachievers to European champions and setting the record of nine consecutive titles

Amidst this backdrop of long-term underachievement by Celtic, Jock Stein was appointed the club's manager in March 1965, replacing Jimmy McGrory and having previously been reserve team coach from 1957 to 1960. He had then moulded Dunfermline into the strong team they were at that time, and then enjoyed a brief but impressive period at Hibs. Celtic had several promising young players in their squad, as was their policy of the time, but they had not had sufficiently talented older teammates or a sophisticated tactical plan to lead them on to greater success; however, this group, including Billy McNeill, Bobby Murdoch, Tommy Gemmell, Bobby Lennox, Jimmy Johnstone and John Hughes plus the older Stevie Chalmers and John Clark did have several years of first team experience behind them. With an attacking playing system and strong man-management, Stein's impact was immediate, as Celtic reached the 1965 Scottish Cup Final and won it by beating Dunfermline, the club's first major honour since the 1957 Scottish League Cup Final (a 7–1 win over Rangers which was very much against the trend of success in that period) and a first medal for the players, who had lost in Old Firm finals of that season's League Cup and the 1962–63 Scottish Cup, plus a previous final to Stein's Dunfermline in the 1960–61 Scottish Cup. By then Bertie Auld had returned to the club, and Stein quickly augmented his squad with goalscorer Joe McBride while promoting Jim Craig and retaining veteran goalkeeper Ronnie Simpson whom he had previously allowed to leave Hibs).

This squad nucleus won the 1965–66 Scottish Division One title and the 1965–66 Scottish League Cup with a win over Rangers, though they lost to the same opponents in the 1966 Scottish Cup Final after a replay and were narrowly eliminated from the Cup Winners' Cup at the semi-final stage. The battle for the league was a tight affair with Rangers, as it would also be for the next two seasons, with Celtic's higher scoring rate prior to the last game of the season (105 goals to their rivals' 87, with five or more scored on 10 occasions including a 5–1 victory in the pivotal New Year Old Firm match) ensuring they would be champions on goal average in any case; they still won the last fixture away to Motherwell to claim a first title in 12 seasons and overcome the psychological blows of losing the cup final and the European semi-final in the preceding weeks. Older hands like John Divers, and Jim Kennedy were allowed to move on, while Ian Young remained in the squad but played no active role in the following campaign.

In 1966–67, Celtic famously won every competition they entered, Stein compensating for an injury to McBride by signing the experienced Willie Wallace. The league race was particularly close, with Rangers in with a chance of taking the title with a win when the teams met at Ibrox on the last scheduled matchday; however Celtic (who also still had a game in hand) secured a 2–2 draw which meant they could not be caught, and as in the previous campaign, a win in the re-arranged fixture put an additional points difference on the completed league table. The campaign climaxed with the 1967 European Cup Final in which Celtic recovered from losing an early goal to dominate the favourites Inter Milan 2–1 and win the European Cup, with the players immortalised as the 'Lisbon Lions'. In a demonstration of Scottish football's strength at the time, Rangers also reached the 1967 European Cup Winners' Cup Final, though lost to Bayern Munich.

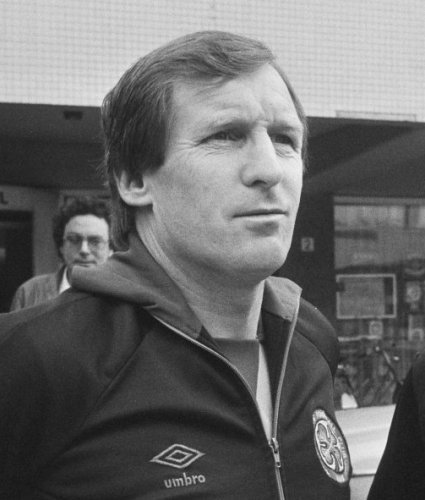
Billy McNeill was Celtic captain throughout their first run of nine titles, and later managed the club during Rangers' run

1967 would prove to be the pinnacle of Celtic's achievements, but they were arguably stronger domestically in later seasons. In 1967–68 their winning margin was only two points over Rangers, who still had a strong team of their own – they beat Celtic in the early Old Firm derby and neither team lost another match for the rest of the season; however while the second derby was drawn, Celtic won all their remaining matches and again scored more goals than Rangers (104 to 91), who drew twice to negate their early points advantage. The Govan club had also decided to part company with long-serving manager Scot Symon mid-season despite leading the table at that point. Rangers' sole loss to Aberdeen in the closing minutes of a rearranged fixture at the end of the campaign not only ended the Ibrox men's hopes of the title but also prevented the unusual achievement of an unbeaten campaign without winning the title. Celtic's final-day trip to Dunfermline which once more put distance between the Glasgow teams at the conclusion of a very close contest, saw East End Park being packed beyond capacity to see the champions play the Scottish Cup holders, with crush barriers giving way and the game halted several times as a tragedy was only narrowly avoided. In 1968–69 the Celtic winning margin was up to six points as another treble was secured, featuring a 4–0 win over Rangers in the 1969 Scottish Cup Final. In 1969–70 the gap was a huge 13 points and thus their loss to Aberdeen in the 1970 Scottish Cup Final was something of a shock. A second European Cup final was reached that season, with Celtic as favourites against Feyenoord, but this time were on the wrong end of the 2–1 scoreline after extra time.

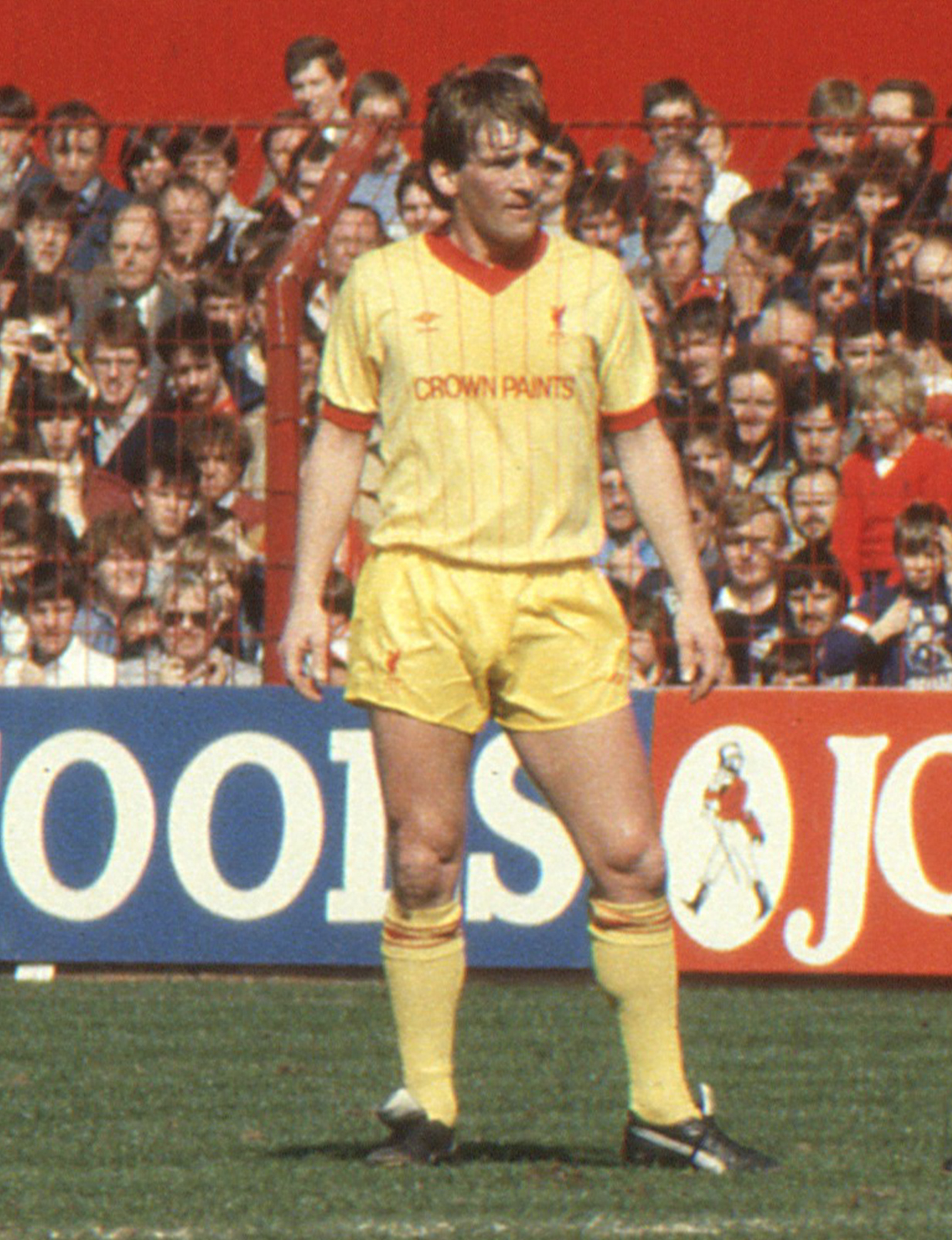
Kenny Dalglish emerged as one of Celtic's most important players of the 1970s

Stein gradually began to introduce more youngsters from the reserve team, known as the Quality Street Kids due to their high standards. Including David Hay, Lou Macari, George Connelly, Kenny Dalglish and later Danny McGrain and Paul Wilson, this group became increasingly regular over the next few seasons alongside the remaining 'Lions', and signings such as Tommy Callaghan, Harry Hood, Dixie Deans and latterly Andy Lynch, plus long term squad members like Pat McCluskey and Jim Brogan. After Ronnie Simpson and his deputy John Fallon left the club, Evan Williams, Ally Hunter and Denis Connaghan all had spells as goalkeeper. Aberdeen got within two points of Celtic in 1970–71, with Rangers 15 behind in fourth. Aberdeen had an opportunity to take the title when they and Celtic met at Pittodrie in April 1971 but Celtic came away with a 1–1 draw, and although they dropped another point in the next fixture (coinciding with Aberdeen's last), they had two postponed matches to play and won them both to retain the championship. In 1971–72 the gap was 10 points, again ahead of Aberdeen (Rangers 16 off Celtic's total), as the Hoops also reached another European Cup semi-final, losing to Inter on a penalty shootout. The early 1970s had been a turbulent period for Rangers, as they not only had to contend with a powerful Celtic but also with the traumatic events of another disaster at Ibrox in January 1971 when 66 supporters died in a crush on a stairway at the end of an Old Firm fixture. This led the club to overhaul the ground into an all-seater stadium over the next decade, overseen by manager Willie Waddell (a 1950s Rangers hero as a player and the boss who led Kilmarnock to the 1965 title), though the financial impact of this undertaking was not obviously felt in the short term. On the field, the struggle to overcome Celtic's domestic run was offset by a victory in the 1972 European Cup Winners' Cup Final, confirming that Scottish teams still maintained high standards comparable to others across the continent despite the domestic dominance of one team alone.

The winning margin closed back to a single point in 1972–73 as Rangers grew stronger under new manager Jock Wallace. The Ibrox men had to recover from an early deficit (three defeats in the first five matches including the Old Firm derby) and later went on a run of 16 victories including the return derby fixture, but it was not enough as Celtic won seven in a row to close their campaign while Rangers stumbled with a draw at Aberdeen, and the league flag was again on its way to the East End of the city. Rangers gained some revenge and a psychological boost with a 3–2 victory in the 1973 Scottish Cup Final between the pair. Celtic won the 1973–74 title by four points over Hibs and five over Rangers, equalling the post-World War II European record of nine consecutive championships. They also won the Scottish Cup and reached the European Cup semi-finals for what would be the last time, going out to Atlético Madrid following an extremely violent first leg in Glasgow.

=== Falling at the tenth, 1974–75 ===
The 1974–75 season could not be described as a complete disappointment for Celtic as they still won the Scottish Cup and League Cup, but their league streak came to an end as they finished 11 points behind Rangers and four behind Hibs, their poor form including three league defeats in a row which had never occurred in the past decade. With Macari and Murdoch having left in 1973, followed by Connelly and Hay in 1974, Jimmy Johnstone moved on and Billy McNeill retired in the summer of 1975; most other serving players stayed and Jock Stein remained in charge, though he was seriously injured in a car crash that summer.

=== Seasonal statistics: Celtic 1965 to 1974 ===
#	Season	P	W	D	L	F	A	Pts	Ahead of (Note: Or 'behind' in the 'stop the 10 season'.)	Margin (Note: Two points for a win.)	Other (Note: Additional trophies won.)
1	1965–66	34	27	3	4	106	30	57	Rangers	+2	(Note: Won the Scottish League Cup.)
2	1966–67	34	26	6	2	111	33	58	Rangers	+3	(Note: Won the 1966–67 European Cup.) (Note: Won the Scottish Cup.)
3	1967–68	34	30	3	1	106	24	63	Rangers	+2	
4	1968–69	34	23	8	3	89	32	54	Rangers	+5	
5	1969–70	34	27	3	4	96	33	57	Rangers	+12	(Note: Reached 1970 European Cup Final.)
6	1970–71	34	25	6	3	89	23	56	Aberdeen	+2	
7	1971–72	34	28	4	2	96	28	60	Aberdeen	+10	
8	1972–73	34	26	5	3	93	28	57	Rangers	+1	
9	1973–74	34	23	7	4	82	27	53	Hibernian	+4	
10	1974–75	34	20	5	9	81	41	45	Rangers	–12 (Note: Finished 12 points behind champions Rangers and 4 behind runners-up Hibs.)	

=== Key player statistics: Celtic 1965 to 1974 ===
Name	Nation	Position	Apps (Note: Appearances during the run of nine only; minimum of 100 for inclusion.)	Goals (Note: Goals during the run of nine only; minimum of 40 for inclusion.)	Wins (Note: Qualification for winning the title: played in 10 matches or more.)	Ref
Billy McNeill	Scotland	DF	282	19	9 (Note: 1965–66) (Note: 1966–67) (Note: 1967–68) (Note: 1968–69) (Note: 1969–70) (Note: 1970–71) (Note: 1971–72) (Note: 1972–73) (Note: 1973–74)	
Jimmy Johnstone	Scotland	W	234	69	9	
Bobby Lennox	Scotland	W	218	132	9	
Bobby Murdoch	Scotland	MF	214	34	8	
Tommy Gemmell	Scotland	FB	184	35	6	
Jim Brogan	Scotland	FB	177	5	7	
Jim Craig	Scotland	FB	148	1	7	
Harry Hood	Scotland	FW	148	64	5	
Willie Wallace	Scotland	FW	142	89	5	
John Hughes	Scotland	FW	137	51	6	
David Hay	Scotland	MF	130	6	5	
Tommy Callaghan	Scotland	MF	127	12	6	
George Connelly	Scotland	DF	118	5	4	
Ronnie Simpson	Scotland	GK	110	0	4	
John Clark	Scotland	DF	106	0	4	
Kenny Dalglish	Scotland	FW	101	56	3	
Bertie Auld	Scotland	MF	100	26	5	
Stevie Chalmers	Scotland	FW	98	61	4	
Dixie Deans	Scotland	FW	78	65	3	
Joe McBride	Scotland	FW	55	55	2	

== New Firm era: 1975 to 1988 ==
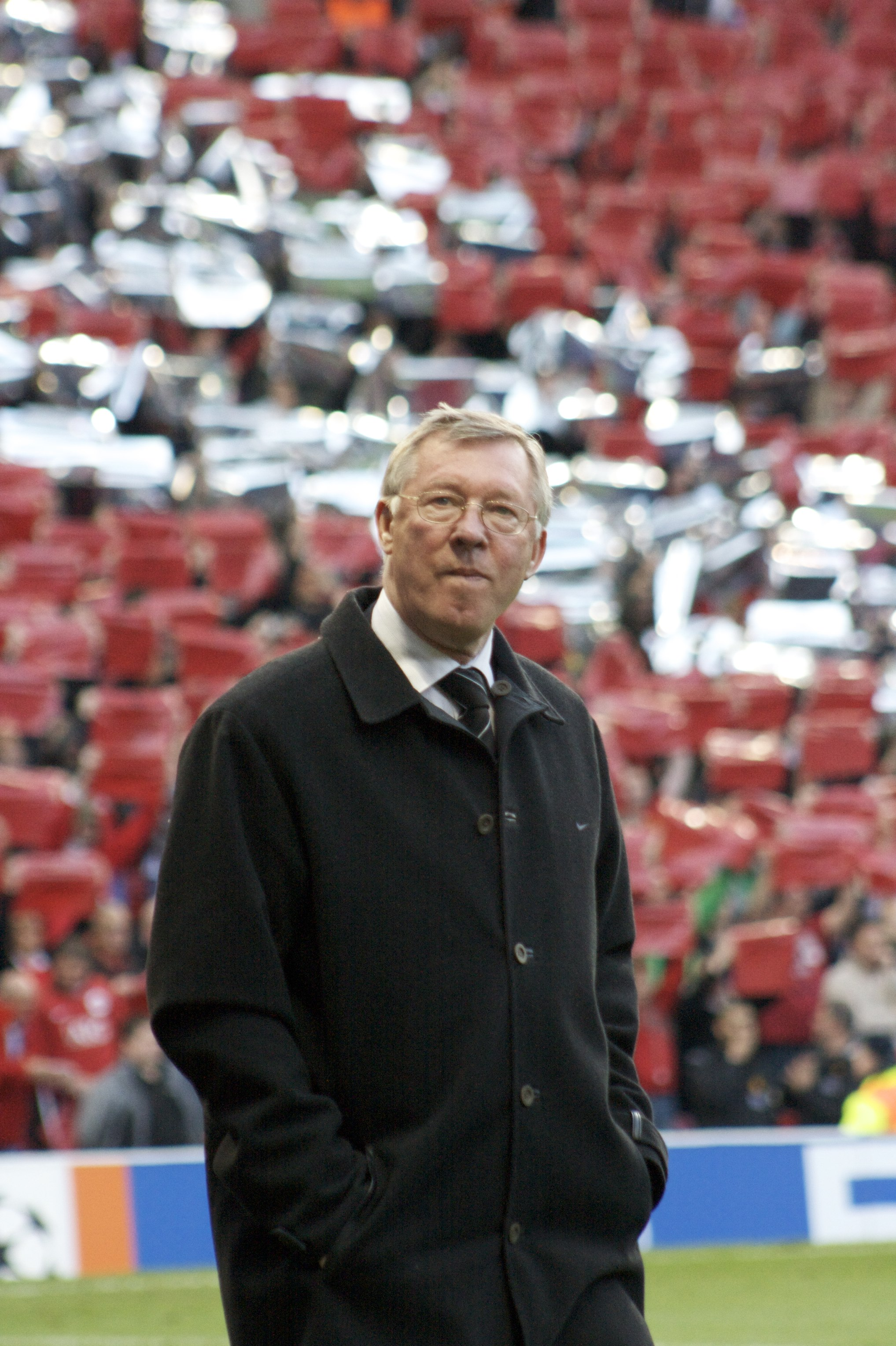
Alex Ferguson's spell at Aberdeen was the only sustained interruption to the Glasgow duopoly after the 1960s.

Attendances had been falling across Scotland, including at Celtic where the success had become commonplace to supporters, and in the summer of 1975 the format was changed to a smaller division with the clubs playing each other more often. Rangers also won the first season of the new Premier Division in 1975–76 as part of a treble, again by a comfortable margin (six points) while Celtic struggled in the absence of Jock Stein who missed the season recovering from his car crash injuries. His Celtic side fought back to win the 1976–77 title by nine points (after which Kenny Dalglish moved on to Liverpool), only for Rangers to respond with another treble in 1977–78, challenged by Aberdeen but with Celtic 19 points behind the champions back in fifth place. Jock Stein departed from Celtic that summer, Billy McNeill taking over. More surprisingly, Jock Wallace also resigned from his Rangers position, reportedly after disputes with Willie Waddell over the club's economic plans, halting what appeared to be a power shift towards the Ibrox men.

Towards the end of the 1970s the financial burden of stadium redevelopment started to impact the ability of Rangers, now managed by their long-serving captain John Greig, to maintain a strong team, and while Celtic remained a force, albeit no longer at the level of a decade earlier, Alex Ferguson's Aberdeen and Jim McLean's Dundee United took advantage of the comparative weaknesses in Glasgow to win four championships, four Scottish Cups and three League Cups between them during the period from 1979 to 1987. They also succeeded internationally: Aberdeen won the 1983 European Cup Winners' Cup Final and Dundee United reached the 1987 UEFA Cup Final. The other titles in that period went to Celtic, who switched manager from McNeill to David Hay in 1983, while Hearts came within a few minutes of a rare title in 1985–86. After an unsuccessful return for Jock Wallace, Rangers' revival began in the summer of 1986, when chairman David Holmes appointed Graeme Souness as player-manager, with several prominent English players soon following him to Ibrox with their clubs banned from European competitions following the 1985 Heysel disaster. A first title in nine years came Rangers' way in 1986–87, although Celtic won a double in their centenary season, 1987–88, again led by Billy McNeill.

== The second Nine: Rangers, 1988 to 1997 ==
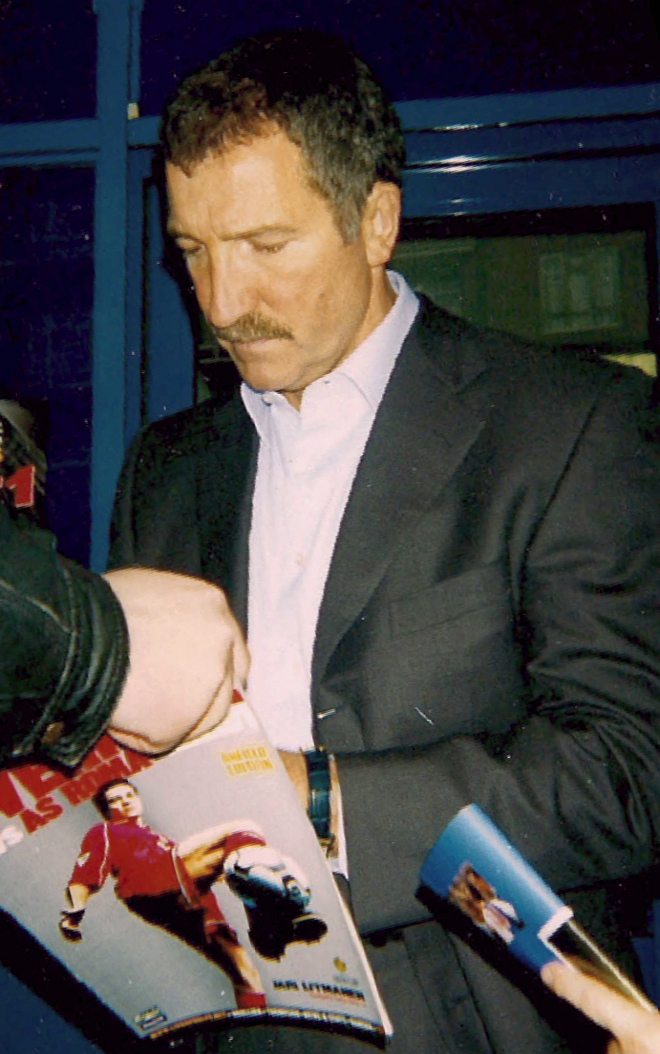
Graeme Souness was Rangers manager for the first two of their run of nine titles, leaving suddenly in the third season – Walter Smith took over

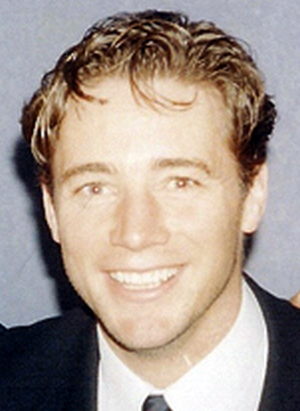
Ally McCoist played in all of Rangers' run of nine titles, and later managed the club during Celtic's second run

Rangers received further investment in November 1988 when David Murray took over as chairman. They already had a strong spine to their team, including the likes of England goalkeeper Chris Woods, defenders Terry Butcher, John Brown and Richard Gough, home-grown midfielder Ian Durrant, winger Mark Walters and striker Ally McCoist. The 1988–89 title went to Ibrox, with Aberdeen in second place and Celtic ten points off the pace. Their rivalry with Aberdeen, which had been brewing since the Dons became contenders in the late 1970s, intensified that season when Durrant suffered a career-threatening injury from a violent challenge by Neil Simpson. In July 1989, Rangers signed Mo Johnston, who previously played for Celtic and had informally agreed to rejoin them. Not only was this 'steal' of a coveted player a psychological coup for Rangers over their rivals, it also marked a change in their 'no Catholics' policy which Souness had publicly criticised as being an impediment to Rangers achieving success due to its non-sporting limitations as to who could play for the club. Not all supporters agreed with this change, though Johnston had some success at the club (by contrast, Celtic had brought in former Rangers star Alfie Conn in 1977 with little protest against his arrival, though his personal involvement was limited by injury). With additional important contributions from Nigel Spackman, Gary Stevens and Trevor Steven, all of whom had experience of winning the English championship, the 1989–90 was a similar story to the previous edition, with Rangers comfortably holding off Alex Smith's Aberdeen (who beat both Glasgow teams in the season's cup finals) and Celtic down in fifth place. In 1990–91 there was a huge gap of 14 points between the Old Firm clubs, with Rangers also winning the 1990 Scottish League Cup Final between them for good measure. Despite the upheaval of Souness leaving at short notice to take over at Liverpool in April, his assistant Walter Smith (who had the same role with Jim McLean at Dundee United) proved to be both a steadying influence and a skilled manager in his own right. Although Aberdeen came close to taking the 1991 championship, Rangers won 2–0 on the last day at Ibrox through a brace from another Englishman, Mark Hateley, when a draw would have taken the trophy to Pittodrie. 30 years later, this was the closest a team outwith the pair from Glasgow had come to winning the title.

Clubs were now required to invest in the safety of their stadia following the 1989 Hillsborough disaster in England, but Rangers required only minimal work to comply with the new regulations (though they had a considerable outlay adding another tier to their main stand to increase capacity), strengthening their financial position in comparison to the other clubs, with Celtic now struggling after years of poor financial management and playing in an outdated stadium. With new key players such as Andy Goram, Stuart McCall and David Robertson, Rangers secured the 1991–92 title by a nine-point margin over Hearts as part of a double, then the 1992–93 title by the same distance over Aberdeen, beating them in both cup finals for a treble. Celtic were a distant third in both campaigns. Rangers also made an impact in Europe, finishing unbeaten, one point behind Olympique Marseille in the 1992–93 UEFA Champions League group stage – at that time the round directly prior to the final. Marseille's subsequent win in that final was soon tarnished by a match-fixing scandal. Overall they lost only four matches over the season, all in the league, two coming after the title was confirmed. Between the two other defeats was a sequence of 45 unbeaten matches in all competitions, ended by an Old Firm loss at Celtic Park three days after a European win over Club Brugge.

On paper the 1993–94 season was close, but the gap between Rangers and Aberdeen closed when the Gers took just two points from the last five matches, having already clinched the championship – although across the season they only won half of their fixtures and lost eight times, unusually low ratios for a title-winning team. Another League Cup was claimed, and only an unexpected defeat to Dundee United in the 1994 Scottish Cup Final thwarted an unprecedented 'double treble'. Celtic were a distant fourth again, with no obvious signs of their situation improving. Their fans organised boycotts and protests against the family-controlled, change-resistant board of directors and by March 1994 the club was hours from being declared bankrupt before a takeover led by Scottish-Canadian businessman Fergus McCann, whose ambitious plan of personal investment and supporter shareholding was to provide funds to rebuild the stadium and modernise the club's commercial arm within five years.

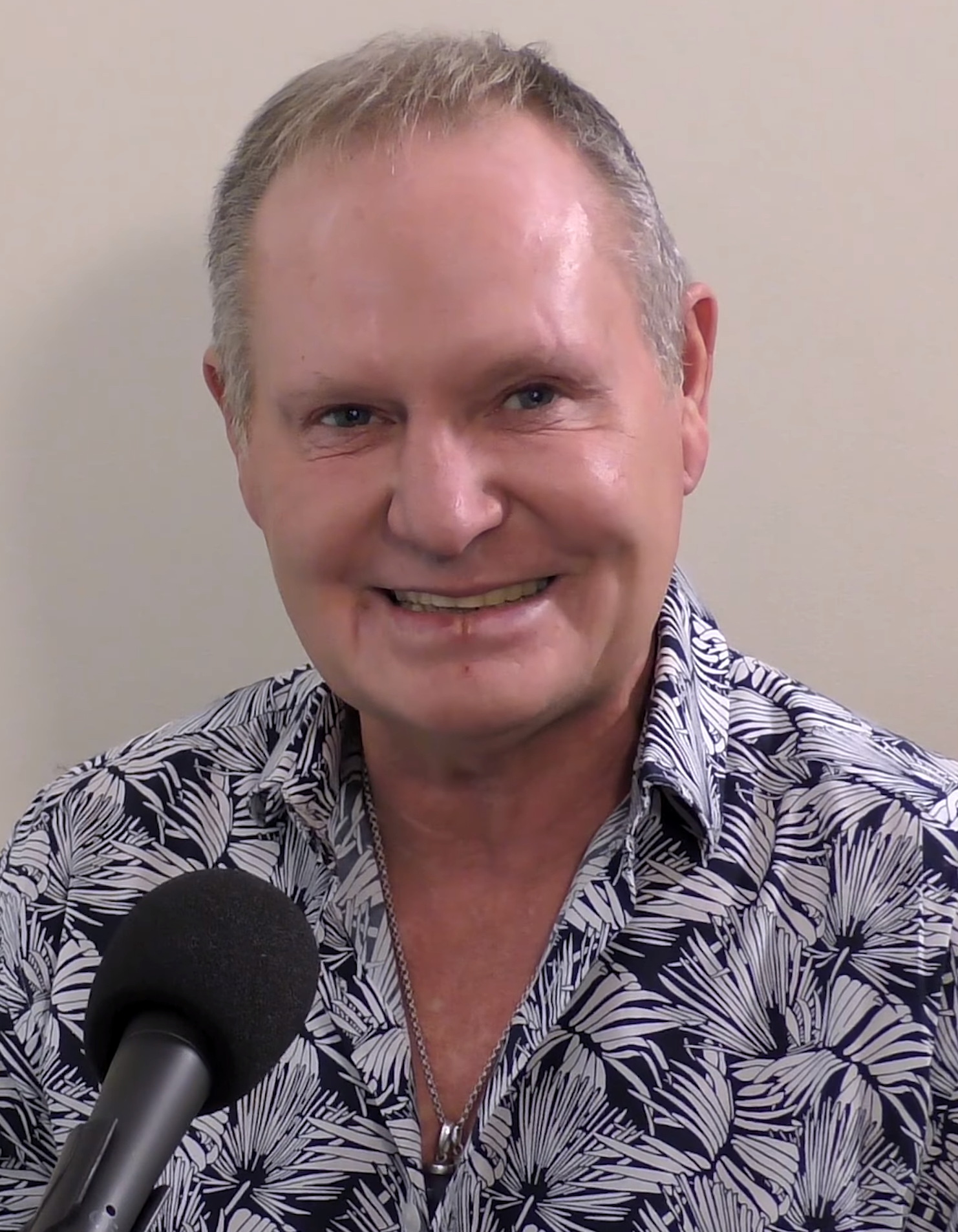
Paul Gascoigne was one of the major big-money Rangers signings to maintain their success, and he played a major role in the last two of their run of wins

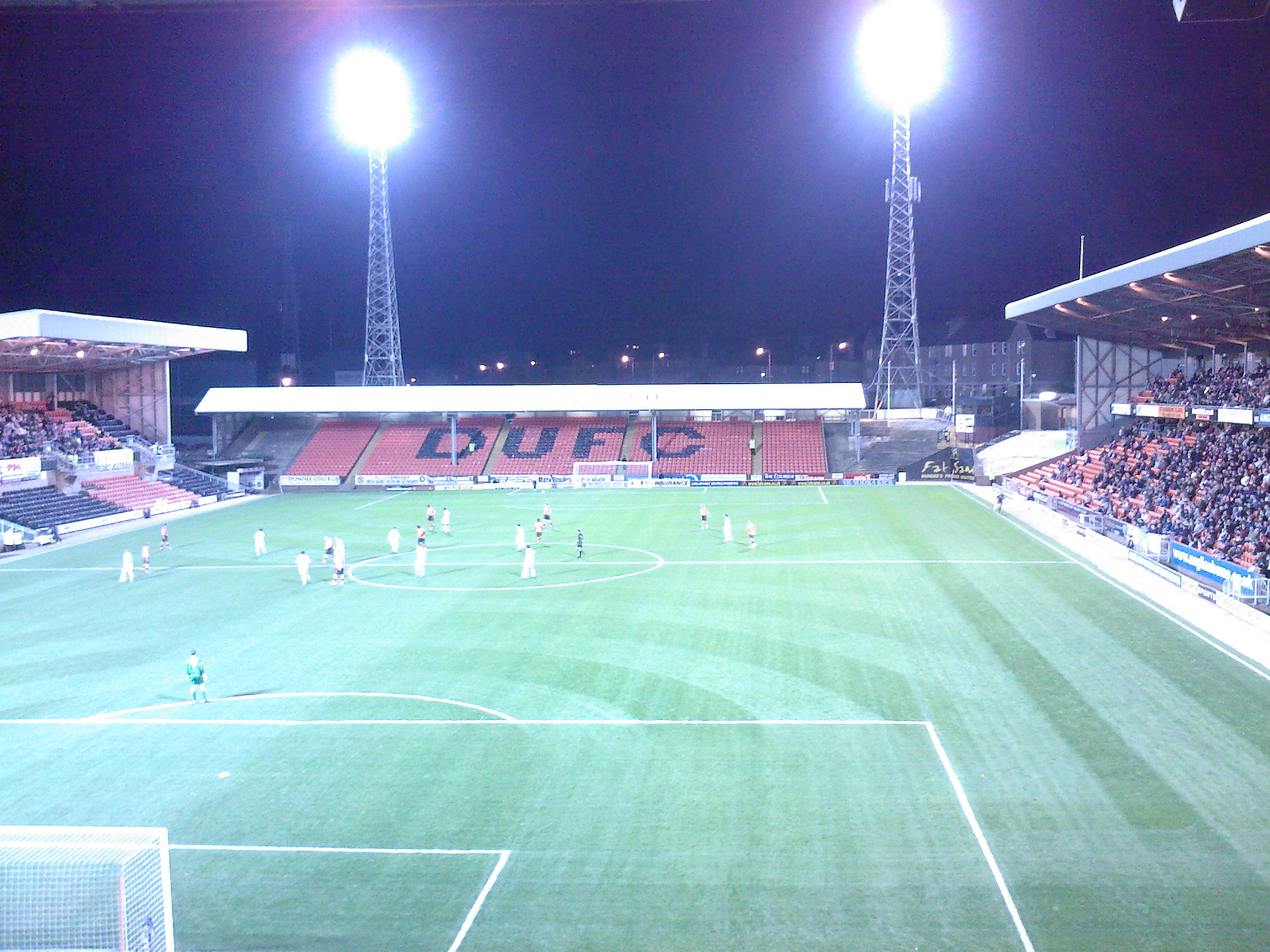
Rangers claimed their ninth title at Tannadice Park in 1997

As foreign signings became more common across the world, high-profile arrivals at Ibrox in the mid-1990s who proved to be capable of match-winning performances on a regular basis included Brian Laudrup, Paul Gascoigne and later Jörg Albertz, though others such as Basile Boli, Peter van Vossen and Oleg Salenko had less impact. In Laudrup's first season, 1994–95, the club had little trouble seeing off Motherwell by a 15-point difference (under the newly introduced 3 points for a win calculation – under the old system, this would have reduced to nine points, whereas the previous season's margin would have increased to eight points using the new system). Celtic again had no impact on the league but did reach the two cup finals under new manager and ex-captain, Tommy Burns, winning the 1994–95 Scottish Cup for a first trophy in six years. Many Celtic supporters, however, were unimpressed by the lack of short term improvement as on the field, Rangers' outlays continued to be larger and their success continued. Another double was won in 1995–96, although this had a genuine title race: Burns' Hoops team, back at a half-finished all-seater Celtic Park after a year lodging at Hampden, lost only one match all season – but it was at home to Rangers, and their failure to recover those points in the other Old Firm fixtures, all of which were drawn, proved crucial as the Ibrox side won an eighth successive championship by four points. 1996–97 was also close between the Glasgow clubs (the others nowhere near the same level) but Smith's men proved themselves in the frantic, pivotal derby matches again, winning all four and conceding only once. Laudrup was the scorer in two 1-0 wins at Celtic Park, and despite the squad being depleted by injuries, it was the Dane who also found the net to confirm the title with the same scoreline away to Dundee United, sparking huge celebrations as the 'nine in a row' record was equalled.

=== Falling at the tenth, 1997–98 ===
Rangers spent some £14 million in the summer of 1997, mostly on Italian players, to boost their squad for the 1997–98 season, but defender Lorenzo Amoruso barely played due to injury leading Smith to recall the veteran Richard Gough (who had been allowed to leave for Major League Soccer), and forward Marco Negri was injured mid-season after a prolific initial spell of 27 goals in the first 18 matches. Their Old Firm head-to-head record was again slightly superior (and also included a Scottish Cup semi-final victory), but this time it was Celtic, who had spent far less but made the significant signing of Henrik Larsson and later added Paul Lambert to their midfield, that lost fewer points to other teams and, after initially failing to clinch the win at Dunfermline almost exactly 30 years after doing so in 1968, took the flag on the final day with a 2–0 home win over St Johnstone, Larsson opening the scoring, to signal huge celebrations of relief among their supporters at having halted their rivals' run and maintained the legacy of one of the Lisbon Lions' enduring achievements (the other being the European Cup win which may never be matched). A deflated Rangers then lost the 1998 Scottish Cup Final to Hearts at Celtic Park, marking a disappointing end to a glorious era for many of their squad including McCall, McCoist, Goram, Durrant and Laudrup (Gascoigne having already been sold on a few months earlier after becoming more of a distracting presence rather than a positive influence around the club). Walter Smith also moved on to be replaced by a first foreign manager, Dutchman Dick Advocaat, while at Celtic his compatriot Wim Jansen, only brought in as head coach a year earlier to follow Tommy Burns, quickly departed despite having delivered the success the fans desperately sought, due to disputes over operations with Fergus McCann and general manager Jock Brown.

=== Seasonal statistics: Rangers 1988 to 1997 ===
#	Season	P	W	D	L	F	A	Pts	Ahead of (Note: Or 'behind' in the 'stop the 10 season'.)	Margin (Note: Two points for a win up to 1993–94; three points for a win from 1994–95.)	Other (Note: Additional trophies won.)
1	1988–89	36	26	4	6	62	26	56	Aberdeen	+6	
2	1989–90	36	20	11	5	48	19	51	Aberdeen	+7	
3	1990–91	36	24	7	5	62	23	55	Aberdeen	+2	
4	1991–92	44	33	6	5	101	31	72	Hearts	+9	
5	1992–93	44	33	7	4	97	35	73	Aberdeen	+9	
6	1993–94	44	22	14	8	74	41	58	Aberdeen	+3	
7	1994–95	36	20	9	7	60	35	69	Motherwell	+15	
8	1995–96	36	27	6	3	85	25	87	Celtic	+4	
9	1996–97	36	25	5	6	85	33	80	Celtic	+5	
10	1997–98	36	21	9	6	76	38	72	Celtic	–2	

=== Key player statistics: Rangers 1988 to 1997 ===
Name	Nation	Position	Apps (Note: Appearances during the run of nine only; minimum of 100 for inclusion.)	Goals (Note: Goals during the run of nine only; minimum of 40 for inclusion.)	Wins (Note: Qualification for winning the title: played in 10 matches or more.)	Ref
Richard Gough	Scotland	DF	263	19	9 (Note: 1988–89) (Note: 1989–90) (Note: 1990–91) (Note: 1991–92) (Note: 1992–93) (Note: 1993–94) (Note: 1994–95) (Note: 1995–96) (Note: 1996–97)	
Ally McCoist	Scotland	FW	230	136	8	
Ian Ferguson	Scotland	MF	203	23	9	
John Brown	Scotland	DF	198	12	8	
Gary Stevens	England	FB	186	8	6	
David Robertson	Scotland	FB	183	15	6	
Mark Hateley	England	FW	169	88	5	
Stuart McCall	Scotland	MF	164	15	5	
Andy Goram	Scotland	GK	160	0	5	
Trevor Steven	England	W	136	16	5	
Ian Durrant	Scotland	MF	125	10	5	
Pieter Huistra	Netherlands	W	125	22	5	
Oleksiy Mykhaylychenko	Ukraine	MF	111	20	4	
Nigel Spackman	England	MF	100	1	3	

== SPL duopoly era: 1998 to 2011 ==
If Rangers had spent big in 1997, their next outlay was unprecedented in Scottish football as David Murray sought to regain their ascendancy. Advocaat spent approximately £27 million on new players in the summer of 1998, while £9 million more was spent over the course of the season (£7 million was recouped in sales). The investment had the desired impact as the club won the treble in 1998–99, the title (the first of the rebranded Scottish Premier League) clinched in an Old Firm match – made notorious by the drunken, chaotic scenes in the stands as Celtic fans' frustration turned to anger and violence – and crowned by a Scottish Cup final win over the same opposition. The following year the spending was more balanced at Ibrox but the dominance was even greater with a 21-point margin of victory. Rangers also acquitted themselves well in the Champions League, though they narrowly failed to qualify from a high-quality group featuring Bayern Munich and Valencia. With the pragmatist McCann having left Celtic with his plan completed and a return on his investment in his pocket, the club were now more able to compete financially with Rangers but were seeing the team again fall behind. In the summer of 2000 they brought in Martin O'Neill as manager and sanctioned a net spend of £10-million worth of player acquisitions (Neil Lennon, Chris Sutton and Alan Thompson in, Mark Viduka out). Rangers countered with a £14 million net spend, mostly on Dutch players including Ronald de Boer, then spent a national record £12 million on Tore André Flo. However it was Celtic who won the treble in 2000–01; Larsson, who missed the previous campaign with a broken leg, scored 53 times in all competitions. Celtic again won the title in 2001–02 collecting 103 points. Rangers were 28 points behind, but themselves 27 ahead of Livingston in third, a gap that would not be unusual in the period as the Old Firm's spending and income levels placed them far out of the reach of the other league members. Needing to compete with Celtic (whose finances were relatively stable with long-term backing from leading shareholder Dermot Desmond) but unable to afford the transfer outlays of the past, Murray began to explore other financial options for Rangers, including an Employee Benefit Trust scheme to supplement wages, something which kept top players at the club in the short term but would have dire consequences further on.

With Alex McLeish now in charge of Rangers, the ending to the 2002–03 Scottish Premier League was almost impossibly dramatic as his side won the title by a margin of one goal (both had 97 points), their 6–1 win on the final day outscoring Celtic who had a 4–0 victory. The Ibrox club won another treble, while Celtic reached the 2003 UEFA Cup final. It was Celtic's turn for a big win and a double in 2003–04, then the following season produced another nail-biting conclusion in Rangers' favour, Motherwell beating Celtic with two late goals while Rangers defeated Hibs on 'Helicopter Sunday' to take the 2004–05 flag by one point. Martin O'Neill left Celtic for family reasons.

With the backing of controversial businessman Vladimir Romanov, Hearts had developed a good squad and they challenged for the 2005–06 Scottish Premier League title, ultimately falling some way short of Gordon Strachan's Celtic but finishing above Rangers, something which had seemed unlikely in the SPL era and leading to McLeish's departure from Ibrox as it became more widely known that the club's finances were in a poor state following the lavish spending of the past decade. Hearts did claim the Scottish Cup, but in 2006–07 that trophy went to Celtic along with the league title, some way ahead of Rangers who invited Walter Smith to return to the club from his role as national team boss after a chaotic spell for French manager Paul Le Guen. In 2007–08 it was the turn of Rangers to enjoy an impressive European run, but like Celtic they found it tough to compete on two fronts, missing out on the league on the last day and ultimately losing the 2008 UEFA Cup final, though they did claim both domestic cups. Smith's Rangers proved themselves superior to Strachan's Celtic in 2008–09, despite the economic situation at the club worsening after David Murray's business interests collapsed in the 2008 financial crisis and the banks that were owed millions escalated moves to recoup their funds via direct involvement at boardroom level to oversee spending. It became known that the EBT scheme was being investigated by HMRC as a possible tax avoidance issue with a potential liability exceeding the sums owed to the bank, making Rangers an unattractive investment to buyers. Matters on the field were still positive, and in 2009–10 Smith claimed a second win in his return spell, Strachan's successor Tony Mowbray failing to last the season before Neil Lennon took the reins. Smith then announced plans to retire; his last season was another triumph as Rangers won the Old Firm 2011 Scottish League Cup Final then prevailed by a point on the last day of the 2010–11 Scottish Premier League season, with a 5–1 win over Kilmarnock (featuring three goals in the opening five minutes) negating Celtic's 4–0 victory against Motherwell. At the same time, David Murray sold his controlling interest in Rangers for a nominal £1 to Craig Whyte, who cleared the bank debt – revealed later to be funded from a mortgage taken out on future season ticket sales.

== The third Nine: Celtic, 2011 to 2020 ==
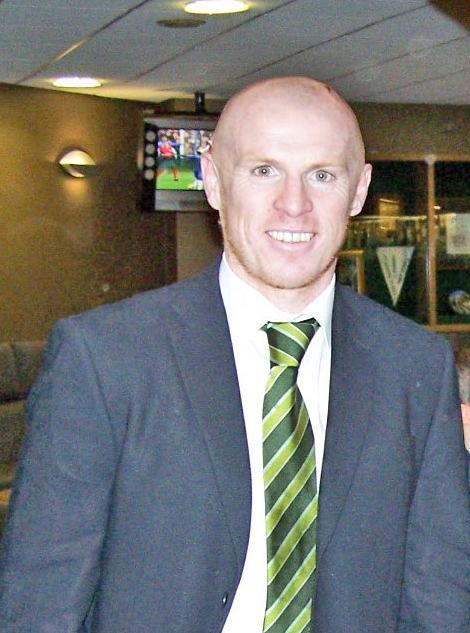
Former Celtic captain Neil Lennon managed the club in two spells during their second run, including the failed attempt at 'the ten'

The third sequence of nine titles had a markedly different context to those from prior decades. As the extent of Rangers' financial issues became more widely publicised, their on-field performance suffered, with an early lead in the 2011–12 Scottish Premier League table wiped out and reversed by Celtic over the campaign. After Craig Whyte failed to keep up with VAT repayments, Rangers entered administration in February 2012 and were docked ten points under league rules, all but confirming Celtic as champions – they were already four ahead, while Rangers had sold their leading scorer Nikica Jelavić two months earlier to raise funds – and the Ibrox club's only resistance being a home win to prevent their rivals mathematically clinching the title on their patch. That summer, Rangers failed to reach an agreement with their creditors and entered liquidation, with a new holding company formed; they were permitted entry to the fourth tier of Scottish football after clubs voted against giving them continued SPL membership, leaving Celtic with an opportunity to build up a period of dominance. As in the length of time between the end of Celtic's run in the 1970s and the start of Rangers' run in the 1980s, 14 seasons had passed between the end that run and what proved to be the beginning of another for Celtic.

Four more titles racked up for Celtic in subsequent seasons under former captain Neil Lennon then Norwegian Ronny Deila, with point margins of victory in the double-digits over Motherwell and Aberdeen on each occasion; however, they won only two of the eight domestic cups played for in that period. Despite gaining entry to the top European competition each year, they failed to build on their performance in the 2012–13 UEFA Champions League (when they beat Barcelona and finished above Benfica to reach the last 16), with outcomes steadily worsening year on year, the qualification path becoming harder as the national coefficient rankings dropped without input from Rangers – typically at least one of the Glasgow teams would have a credible run each year – and income contracted as the lucrative group stages and beyond were seldom reached. As broadcasting and advertising revenues coming into Scottish football diminished in the absence of one half of its biggest rivalry, Celtic attempted to keep a strong squad capable of making progress in Europe, without overspending on player wages while domestic dominance could be sustained with little difficulty; they became known as a club who sought to use their recruitment network to bring in young players from diverse origins at low cost who would later be sold on to richer English clubs at a profit such as Fraser Forster, Victor Wanyama and Virgil van Dijk who all joined Southampton for large fees – although publicly the management denied that the status they had acquired as a 'stepping stone' was intentional. Those who stayed at the club longer included Kris Commons, Emilio Izaguirre, Efe Ambrose, Mikael Lustig, Leigh Griffiths and the constant presence of Scott Brown. Meanwhile, it took Rangers four years to climb back up to the top division, with their progress stalled by the unexpected presence in the Scottish Championship (second level) of both Hibernian and Hearts (themselves enduring a financial crisis) in 2014–15. After finishing behind both Edinburgh clubs that season, the Gers gained promotion a year later under manager Mark Warburton and also enjoyed a morale-boosting win over Celtic in the 2015–16 Scottish Cup semi-final which contributed to Deila's departure, though then lost to Hibs in the final.

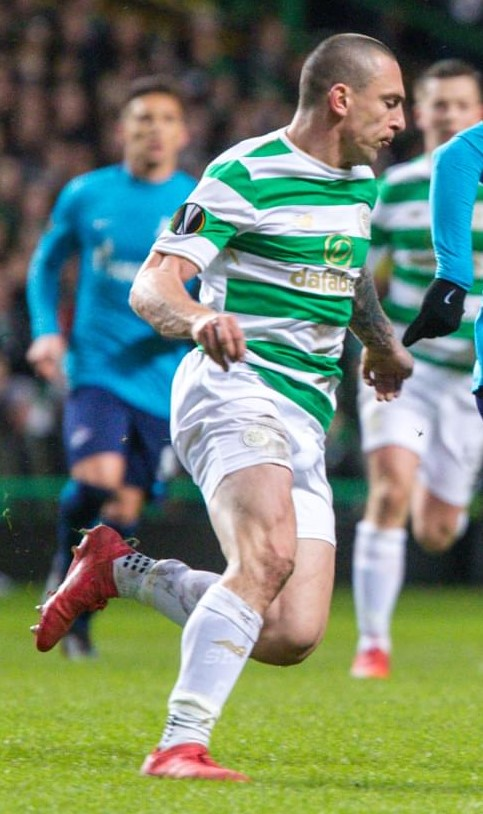
Scott Brown captained Celtic in all nine titles in their second run

Both clubs now back in the Premiership for 2016–17, and as season ticket sales rose in anticipation of their renewed meetings, Brendan Rodgers became Celtic manager. He quickly made an impact on his players, with noticeable improvements in the likes of academy products James Forrest, Kieran Tierney and Callum McGregor and strong performances from new signings Moussa Dembélé and Scott Sinclair, although his first competitive fixture was a defeat to Gibraltarian amateurs Lincoln Red Imps in Champions League qualification. Still operating from a far smaller budget, Rangers had no answer to Celtic's upturn in quality and suffered a 5–1 defeat in the first Old Firm derby which featured a Dembélé hat-trick, the first from a Celtic player in the fixture since 1973. Celtic eliminated Rangers from both cups at the semi-final stage and won 5–1 again, this time at Ibrox, in April 2017, by which time Warburton had been replaced by Pedro Caixinha. Celtic finished the league campaign undefeated with a record points total of 106 and won both cups to be dubbed 'the invincibles' and also returned to the Champions League groups, although there Rodgers' playing style was exposed by Barcelona; Rangers were third behind Aberdeen. The pattern barely altered in 2017–18 as Celtic won all three trophies in an unprecedented 'double treble'; overall their stats were slightly poorer than the season prior and Rangers' slightly better, but Aberdeen still finished ahead of the Govan men. Caixinha – who never seemed likely to recover from a loss to part-time opponents Progrès Niederkorn in the UEFA Europa League's opening round – failed to last to the end of the calendar year, and his short-term replacement Graeme Murty oversaw two heavy defeats to Celtic in April 2018 before himself being dismissed.

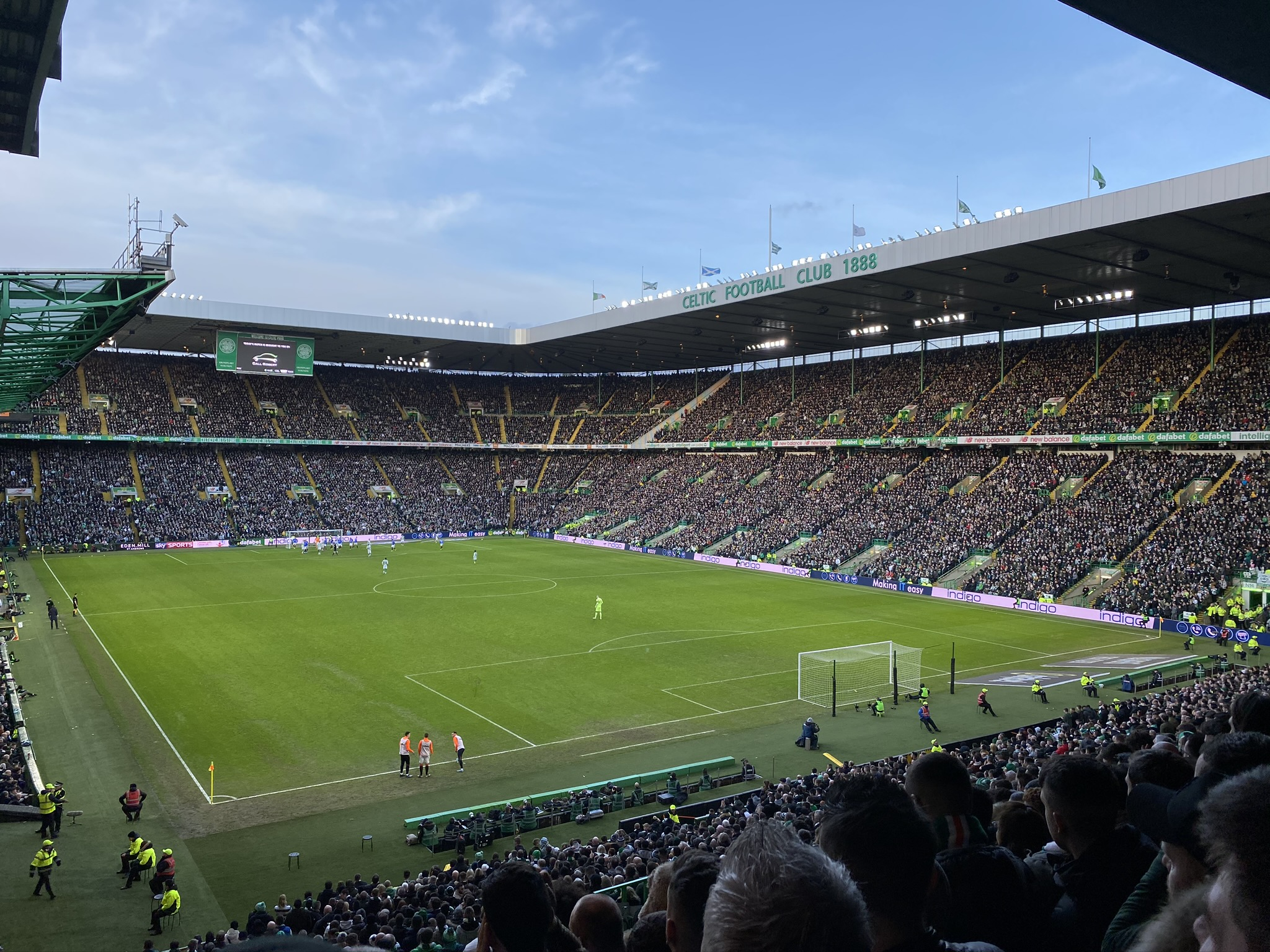
The Old firm match in December 2019 seen here was won by Rangers, but Celtic won the title for the ninth time in succession

With former Liverpool captain Steven Gerrard installed as Rangers' new manager for the 2018–19 season in his maiden role in charge of a senior team and his first experience of Scottish football, his side showed improvement on previous years but developed a habit of dropping points by conceding late goals; at the start of 2019 they were level with Celtic in the Premiership table after winning an Old Firm derby for the first time since 2016, inflicting Rodgers' first defeat in the fixture. Celtic's form again was slightly poorer, with elimination from the Champions League qualifying stages having sold on Dembélé (partly replaced by the permanent signing of his on-loan understudy Odsonne Édouard). The lack of investment in the squad clearly irritated Rodgers, and despite his team maintaining winning form while Rangers lost theirs to open up an eight-point gap, he decided to accept a position at Leicester City at the end of February 2019. The familiar figure of Neil Lennon was brought in to minimise the disruption, and he successfully steered Celtic to an eighth title (9 points ahead of Rangers, who themselves were 11 ahead of Kilmarnock in third, signalling a return to the previous 'two-horse race' dynamic) and a third consecutive treble, Édouard scoring the winner over Hearts in the 2019 Scottish Cup Final. Lennon was then appointed manager on a permanent basis.

Rangers showed further improvement in 2019–20 with another December victory over Celtic, although they were on the back foot from the start after losing the early-season meeting at Ibrox. At Celtic, the owners' desire to remain financially secure and maintain the wage structure via outgoing player sales, which had been a factor in Brendan Rodgers's departure, was again demonstrated when Kieran Tierney moved to Arsenal with little of the record fee used directly for incoming transfers to improve the team, despite Neil Lennon's stated hopes in this regard, after another failure to reach the lucrative Champions League group stage. Both Glasgow clubs performed strongly in the 2019–20 UEFA Europa League, and Celtic won the League Cup with a 1–0 win over Rangers, who created far more chances, failed to score a penalty and had a numerical advantage for the last half-hour. Following the winter break, Rangers again produced some poor results whereas Celtic won all their matches, and the Gers were 13 points behind their rivals (with a game in hand) by the time of the next Old Firm fixture – however it was never played, being cancelled at a day's notice due to the developing COVID-19 pandemic in Scotland. With no prospect of the league season resuming before the new one was due to start, in May 2020 Celtic were declared champions to equal the nine in a row record. As not all fixtures had been completed, some observers (mostly connected to Rangers) suggested this title was not fully merited despite the strong lead Celtic had at the point of stopping. The Hoops now had a chance to claim the historic titles record for themselves, as well as extend their unprecedented streak of trebles.

=== Falling at the tenth, 2020–21 ===
Initial signs were that the 2020–21 Scottish Premiership (played almost entirely in empty stadiums due to the pandemic) would be closely fought between the sides, with both sets of players under immense pressure and scrutiny to either achieve or prevent the tenth title. They both were unbeaten going into the first Old Firm fixture at Celtic Park, which ended in a convincing 2–0 Rangers win. It was the start of a very poor sequence for Celtic, with three draws in the next four league fixtures leaving them 13 points behind Rangers by early December, with their record-breaking hopes in jeopardy. Their cup-winning sequence was ended with another weak performance against Ross County, leading to a protest by hundreds of supporters outside their stadium despite a ban on groups congregating under Covid regulations. Already eliminated from the Champions League, they quickly lost all prospect of qualifying from their Europa League group, while the more consistent Rangers finished at the top of theirs to progress. The one consolation for Celtic was in the delayed 2019–20 Scottish Cup, in which they overcame Aberdeen then Hearts in a penalty shootout at Hampden Park to claim the 'quadruple treble'.

Celtic had performed strongly in the previous Januarys while Rangers faltered, but the opposite occurred going into 2021: the second Old Firm match again went the way of the Ibrox side, albeit in a tight contest settled by an own goal. With the standard winter break cancelled, Celtic still decided to take a short trip to Dubai only for most of the squad to be forced to self-isolate on returning to Scotland under Covid regulations, and their makeshift team only took three points from four matches while Rangers kept winning to build up a huge 23-point lead by the end of the month. Lennon resigned from Celtic in February, and the title (the 55th in their history and the first since 2011) was secured for Gerrard's Rangers by early March, even before the often-pivotal third Old Firm fixture was played. With Rangers supporters unable to watch on from the stands or from pubs as normal, preventing their rivals from achieving the titles record, and the return to prominence for their own club amidst the uniquely challenging circumstances of the previous decade, there were outpourings of emotion; while the players celebrated inside the dressing room, fans gathered outside Ibrox and came together in their thousands (many with alcohol and pyrotechnics) at George Square in central Glasgow and elsewhere, despite bans on public gatherings still being in place. The police were unable to disperse the exuberant crowd due to its numbers and some street furniture was damaged, resulting in tense exchanges between the club and the Scottish Government.

The Old Firm clubs were then drawn together in the 2020–21 Scottish Cup Round of 16, with the outcome reflecting their respective seasons as a whole: Celtic had several chances but failed to score (an Edouard penalty was saved by Allan McGregor, a returning veteran from their last title win along with Steven Davis), while Rangers attacked effectively, found the net twice and kept a clean sheet to claim the victory and end their rivals' hopes of a trophy. The result also reinforced the view that the balance of power had firmly shifted to the men from Govan, in contrast to both the long period of Celtic dominance, and also the recent seasons when their strength was fairly even but the Hoops had the edge over the course of a campaign. Rangers were eliminated from the Scottish Cup by St Johnstone but defeated Celtic again in the league (4–1 at Ibrox), and completed an unbeaten campaign with a 4–0 win over Aberdeen to finish 25 points ahead of their rivals, with their total of 102 falling short of that of Brendan Rodgers' Celtic in 2016–17. Rangers fans again gathered outside the stadium in their thousands and marched to central Glasgow, where celebrations in George Square once more descended into disorder, to condemnation from the authorities. The season had an unexpected conclusion as St Johnstone went on to win the Scottish Cup; the Perth side had already claimed the League Cup a few months earlier, so became the first time a non-Old Firm club to win two trophies in a season since Aberdeen in 1989–90.

=== Seasonal statistics: Celtic 2011 to 2020 ===
#	Season	P	W	D	L	F	A	Pts	Ahead of (Note: Or 'behind' in the 'stop the 10 season'.)	Margin (Note: Three points for a win.)	Other (Note: Additional trophies won.)
1	2011–12	38	30	3	5	84	21	93	Rangers	+20 (Note: Includes a 10-point deduction incurred by Rangers for entering administration. Rangers were not present in the top division for the following four seasons.)	
2	2012–13	38	24	7	7	92	35	79	Motherwell	+16	
3	2013–14	38	31	6	1	102	25	99	Motherwell	+27	
4	2014–15	38	29	5	4	84	17	92	Aberdeen	+15	
5	2015–16	38	26	8	4	93	31	86	Aberdeen	+15	
6	2016–17	38	34	4	0	106	25	106	Aberdeen	+30	
7	2017–18	38	24	10	4	73	25	82	Aberdeen	+9	
8	2018–19	38	27	6	5	77	20	87	Rangers	+9	
9	2019–20 (Note: Season curtailed and standings at time of postponement declared final on 18 May 2020.)	30	26	2	2	89	19	80	Rangers	+13 (Note: Rangers had a game in hand; 'points per game' algorithm used: Celtic 2.67 ppg, Rangers 2.31ppg.)	
10	2020–21	38	22	11	5	78	29	77	Rangers	–25	

=== Key player statistics: Celtic 2011 to 2020 ===
Name	Nation	Position	Apps (Note: Appearances during the run of nine only; minimum of 100 for inclusion.)	Goals (Note: Goals during the run of nine only; minimum of 40 for inclusion.)	Wins (Note: Qualification for winning the title: played in 10 matches or more.)	Ref
Scott Brown	Scotland	MF	257	17	9 (Note: 2011–12) (Note: 2012–13) (Note: 2013–14) (Note: 2014–15) (Note: 2015–16) (Note: 2016–17) (Note: 2017–18) (Note: 2018–19) (Note: 2019–20)	
James Forrest	Scotland	W	222	54	9	
Callum McGregor	Scotland	MF	177	31	6	
Mikael Lustig	Sweden	FB	160	13	7	
Emilio Izaguirre	Honduras	FB	157	3	7	
Leigh Griffiths	Scotland	FW	151	84	7	
Craig Gordon	Scotland	GK	147	0	5	
Nir Bitton	Israel	MF	138	9	6	
Kris Commons	Scotland	MF	135	53	5	
Fraser Forster	England	GK	132	0	4	
Tom Rogic	Australia	MF	123	25	5	
Efe Ambrose	Nigeria	DF	113	5	4	
Charlie Mulgrew	Scotland	DF	111	20	5	
Anthony Stokes	Republic of Ireland	FW	106	45	4	
Scott Sinclair	England	W	105	40	3	
Kieran Tierney	Scotland	FB	102	5	4	
Adam Matthews	Wales	FB	100	4	4	
Odsonne Édouard	France	FW	81	46	3	
Gary Hooper	England	FW	69	43	2	

== Since 2021 ==
Celtic's next manager Ange Postecoglou quickly imposed his playing style on Celtic and re-established them as the leading team, winning five out of the six domestic trophies between 2021 and 2023 before moving on to Tottenham Hotspur, with Brendan Rodgers returning to replace him. At Rangers, Steven Gerrard was also enticed to England by Aston Villa, and his successor Giovanni van Bronckhorst, a successful player at Ibrox 20 years earlier, lasted little more than a year due to falling behind Celtic in the league, despite leading the club to the 2022 UEFA Europa League final and winning the 2022 Scottish Cup final (beating Hearts, now on the losing side in 3 out of 4 finals), their first major cup silverware in 11 years. Gerrard's former assistant Michael Beale was brought in, but lost an Old Firm League Cup final and title race in his first campaign and was sacked at the start of the next, with a loss to Celtic at Ibrox among the contributory factors.

== Women: Glasgow City monopoly ==
Women's football in Scotland, which became more organised in the 1990s, had a separate tale of dominance, with Glasgow City (unconnected to either Old Firm club) winning 14 consecutive Scottish Women's Premier League titles between 2007 and 2021. As the sport became more prominent, both Celtic and Rangers offered professional contracts to women's players from 2019 and grew stronger on the field; Rangers ended the Glasgow City sequence in 2021–22.

== See also ==
- Dynasty (sports)
- European association football club records and statistics
- List of Celtic F.C. seasons
- List of Rangers F.C. seasons
- List of Scottish football champions
