= 1973–74 Scottish Cup =

Tournament details
- Country: Scotland

Final positions
- Champions: Celtic
- Runners-up: Dundee United

The 1973–74 Scottish Cup was the 89th staging of Scotland's most prestigious football knockout competition. The Cup was won by Celtic who defeated Dundee United in the final.

== First round ==
Home team	Score	Away team
Berwick Rangers	0–0	Albion Rovers
East Stirlingshire	0–0	Clydebank
Hamilton Academical	0–0	Alloa Athletic
Lossiemouth	3–3	Fraserburgh
Queen's Park	1–0	Edinburgh University

=== Replays ===
Home team	Score	Away team
Fraserburgh	6–0	Lossiemouth
Albion Rovers	2–0	Berwick Rangers
Alloa Athletic	4–1	Hamilton Academical
Clydebank	1–0	East Stirlingshire

== Second round ==
Home team	Score	Away team
Brechin City	5–1	Stenhousemuir
Clachnacuddin	1–1	Clydebank
Cowdenbeath	4–1	Fraserburgh
Ferranti Thistle	1–0	Civil Service Strollers
Queen of the South	1–0	Albion Rovers
Queen's Park	6–1	Hawick Royal Albert
Ross County	1–2	Forfar Athletic
Stranraer	1–0	Alloa Athletic

=== Replays ===
Home team	Score	Away team
Clydebank	3–2	Clachnacuddin

== Third round ==
Home team	Score	Away team
Aberdeen	0–2	Dundee
Celtic	6–1	Clydebank
Cowdenbeath	0–5	Ayr United
Falkirk	2–2	Dunfermline Athletic
Forfar Athletic	1–6	St Johnstone
Montrose	1–1	Stirling Albion
Motherwell	2–0	Brechin City
Partick Thistle	6–1	Ferranti Thistle
Queen of the South	1–0	East Fife
Raith Rovers	2–2	Greenock Morton
Arbroath	1–0	Dumbarton
Dundee United	4–1	Airdrieonians
Hearts	3–1	Clyde
Hibernian	5–2	Kilmarnock
Rangers	8–0	Queen's Park
Stranraer	1–1	St Mirren

=== Replays ===
Home team	Score	Away team
Dunfermline Athletic	1–0	Falkirk
Stirling Albion	3–1	Montrose
Greenock Morton	0–0	Raith Rovers
St Mirren	1–1	Stranraer

==== Second Replays ====
Home team	Score	Away team
Stranraer	3–2	St Mirren
Greenock Morton	1–0	Raith Rovers

== Fourth round ==
Home team	Score	Away team
Celtic	6–1	Stirling Albion
Dundee United	1–0	Greenock Morton
Dunfermline Athletic	1–0	Queen of the South
Rangers	0–3	Dundee
Arbroath	1–3	Motherwell
Hearts	1–1	Partick Thistle
St Johnstone	1–3	Hibernian
Stranraer	1–7	Ayr United

=== Replays ===
Home team	Score	Away team
Partick Thistle	1–4	Hearts

== Quarter-finals ==
Home team	Score	Away team
Celtic	2–2	Motherwell
Dunfermline Athletic	1–1	Dundee United
Hearts	1–1	Ayr United
Hibernian	3–3	Dundee

=== Replays ===
Home team	Score	Away team
Dundee	3–0	Hibernian
Ayr United	1–2	Hearts
Motherwell	0–1	Celtic
Dundee United	4–0	Dunfermline Athletic

== Semi-finals ==
3 April 1974

Celtic	1–0	Dundee

Hampden Park, Glasgow
Attendance: 58,250

6 April 1974

Hearts	1–1	Dundee United

Hampden Park, Glasgow
Attendance: 22,725

=== Replays ===
9 April 1974

Dundee United	4–2	Hearts

Hampden Park, Glasgow
Attendance: 12,860

== Final ==
4 May 1974

Celtic	3–0	Dundee United
Deans; Hood; Murray

Hampden Park, Glasgow
Attendance: 75,959
Referee: J.W. Paterson

== See also ==
- 1973–74 in Scottish football
- 1973–74 Scottish League Cup
