= 1973–74 British Home Championship =

Tournament details
- Dates: 11–18 May 1974
- Teams: 4

Final positions
- Champions: England (49th title); Scotland (39th title)

Tournament statistics
- Matches played: 6
- Goals scored: 9 (1.5 per match)
- Top scorer: 7 players (1 each)

The 1973–74 British Home Championship Home Nations football tournament was, like the two championships which preceded it, subject to rescheduled matches due to The Troubles in Northern Ireland. Scotland, who should have visited Belfast to play their match against Northern Ireland, instead hosted the game in Glasgow as the previous years solution of matches being played in Liverpool was not taken up. Bereft of home advantage, the Irish struggled to contain their opponents, although they did begin well with a narrow win over the Scots. In their first matches, England enjoyed their home advantage to claim victories over the Welsh and Irish while the Welsh crashed to defeat against England and Scotland. With the confusing schedule, by the final match England seemed to be favourites, only needing a draw with the Scots in Glasgow to claim the championship while a loss would still tie the series (goal difference was not at this stage used to calculate position). The Northern Irish, who could still have sneaked the championship themselves, lost a close game to the Welsh, leaving England and Scotland to battle for the final placements, the Scots reaching parity in the competition thanks to a 2–0 victory.

== Table ==
Team	Pld	W	D	L	GF	GA	GD	Pts
Scotland (C)	3	2	0	1	4	1	+3	4
England (C)	3	2	0	1	3	2	+1	4
Northern Ireland	3	1	0	2	1	2	−1	2
Wales	3	1	0	2	1	4	−3	2

Rules for classification: 1) points. The points system worked as follows: 2 points for a win and 1 point for a draw.
(C) Co-champions

== Results ==
11 May 1974

Scotland	0–1	Northern Ireland
	Report	Cassidy 39'

Hampden Park, Glasgow
Attendance: 53,775
Referee: Iorwerth Jones (Wales)

11 May 1974

Wales	0–2	England
	Report	Bowles 37'; Keegan 56'

Ninian Park, Cardiff
Attendance: 25,734
Referee: Redmond McFadden (Northern Ireland)

14 May 1974

Scotland	2–0	Wales
Dalglish 23'; Jardine 44' (pen.)	Report

Hampden Park, Glasgow
Attendance: 41,969
Referee: Malcolm Wright (Northern Ireland)

15 May 1974

England	1–0	Northern Ireland
Weller 73'	Report

Wembley Stadium, London
Attendance: 45,500
Referee: Bobby Davidson (Scotland)

18 May 1974

Wales	1–0	Northern Ireland
Smallman 26'	Report

Racecourse Ground, Wrexham
Attendance: 9,310
Referee: Pat Partridge (England)

18 May 1974

Scotland	2–0	England
Pejic 4' (o.g.); Todd 30' (o.g.)	Report

Hampden Park, Glasgow
Attendance: 94,487
Referee: Leo van der Kroft (Netherlands)
