= Harry Hood (footballer) =

Scottish footballer and manager (1944–2019)

Personal information
- Full name: Henry Anthony Hood
- Date of birth: 3 October 1944
- Place of birth: Glasgow, Scotland
- Date of death: 26 May 2019 (aged 74)
- Position: Forward

Youth career
- St Roch's

Senior career*
Years	Team	Apps	(Gls)
1962–1964	Clyde	63	(40)
1964–1966	Sunderland	31	(9)
1966–1969	Clyde	87	(30)
1969–1976	Celtic	312	(123)
1976	San Antonio Thunder	20	(10)
1976–1977	Motherwell	15	(0)
1977–1978	Queen of the South	32	(4)
Total		436	(166)

International career
1967	Scotland	3	(0)
1970	Scottish League XI	1	(0)
1968	Scotland U23	1	(1)

Managerial career
- 1981: Albion Rovers
- 1981–1982: Queen of the South
- * Club domestic league appearances and goals

Henry Anthony Hood (3 October 1944 – 26 May 2019) was a Scottish football player and manager.

A forward noted for his skill, he played for Clyde (two spells), Celtic, Motherwell and Queen of the South in Scotland, Sunderland in England and San Antonio Thunder in the United States. He won eleven domestic honours with Celtic. He later managed Albion Rovers and Queen of the South, and was a businessman involved in the hospitality sector.

== Football career ==
=== Club ===
Born in Glasgow and raised in the city's Garthamlock neighbourhood, Hood's older brother Jackie was also a footballer who won the Liverpool Senior Cup while a reserve player at Everton but had returned to Scotland and local Junior club St Roch's by the time his younger sibling was starting his career. Harry Hood initially attended school at St Aloysius' College where rugby union was the chosen sport. Seeking a schoolboy appearance for Scotland, he moved to Holyrood Secondary School but was overlooked for the national schoolboy squad as he had already registered as a senior player at St Roch's.

In summer 1962, he signed for Clyde, making his Scottish Division One debut in November of that year, aged 18. Clyde were relegated to the second tier, but in the lower division Hood flourished, scoring 37 times from 45 appearances in all competitions during the 1963–64 season as the club gained promotion. This good form continued into the next campaign and, after hesitating over a move to Celtic, the team he had supported in childhood, he was transferred to English club Sunderland for a fee of £30,000 in November 1964. In an early outing for the Roker Park club, Hood scored the only goal of the match against Manchester United. Hood missed the entire 1965–66 season because he pulled a double hernia in pre-season, and after his recovery, he was in a group of players frozen out by manager Ian McColl. Overall his spell in England was not particularly successful and in October 1966 he returned to Clyde for £13,000. The 1966–67 Scottish Division One season proved to be one of the best in the club's history as they finished in 3rd position, behind only European Cup winners Celtic and European Cup Winners' Cup finalists Rangers.

Hood signed for Celtic in March 1969 for a £40,000 transfer fee, and quickly established himself in a talented group managed by Jock Stein, including the Europe-conquering Lisbon Lions and the emerging highly rated youth players such as Kenny Dalglish dubbed the Quality Street Gang. After playing a part in the team's run to the 1970 European Cup Final, he was not selected for the match in Milan as Celtic lost to Feyenoord. He scored the winning goal against Rangers in the 1971 Scottish Cup Final replay as Celtic won 2–1, and also scored the first goal in the 1974 Scottish Cup Final, a 3–0 victory over Dundee United.

With Celtic, Hood won six Scottish league championships, three Scottish Cups and two Scottish League Cups; He scored 123 goals in all major competitions for the club. His presence onto the field at Parkhead was often greeted with a 'Hare Krishna' chant. Hood scored a hat-trick in an Old Firm game against Rangers in 1973, a feat that was not repeated until Moussa Dembélé achieved it in 2016.

Hood left Celtic in 1976 and, after short spells with San Antonio Thunder in the NASL and Motherwell, ended his playing career with Dumfries club Queen of the South in season 1977–78. After a spell managing Albion Rovers, Hood returned to Queens in the summer of 1981 as manager, just after the club had been promoted to the First Division.

=== International ===
In the 1967 close season Hood was a member of an unofficial Scotland national team which travelled to destinations including Israel, Australia and Canada, winning every match. For many years the tour matches were not recognised as full internationals by the Scottish Football Association as full internationals, even though their opponents Israel and Australia did. A BBC Sport article in June 2020 identified him as one of the best Scottish players to have never played a full international. The SFA announced in October 2021 that some of the tour matches would be reclassified as full internationals which meant that Hood was posthumously awarded an international cap. – some match reports also credit him with a goal (against Israel) which is elsewhere assigned to Alex Ferguson.

== Later years ==
After his retirement from football, Hood ran a company (named Lisini, incorporating the names of his three children) which owned and ran several public houses and restaurants in the Greater Glasgow area. In 2012, he was inducted into the Clyde FC Hall of Fame.

After a battle with cancer, Hood died around 6:30am on 26 May 2019, aged 74.

== Honours ==
=== Club ===
Celtic

- Scottish League (6): 1968–69, 1969–70, 1970–71, 1971–72, 1972–73, 1973–74
- Scottish Cup (3): 1970–71, 1973–74, 1974–75
- Scottish League Cup (2): 1969–70, 1974–75
- Drybrough Cup: 1974

=== Individual ===
- Scottish Division One top goalscorer: 1970–71
