= 1974–75 Scottish Division Two =

Scottish Second Division
- Season: 1974–75
- Champions: Falkirk
- Promoted: Falkirk; Queen of the South; Montrose; Hamilton Academical; East Fife; St Mirren

The 1974–75 Scottish Second Division was won by Falkirk, and Forfar Athletic finished bottom.

Due to the introduction of a new premier division in Scotland for season 1975-76 the top six teams from the Second Division were promoted to the First Division.

This season saw the Scottish Football League debut of Meadowbank Thistle.

== Table ==
Pos	Team	Pld	W	D	L	GF	GA	GD	Pts	Promotion or relegation
1	Falkirk (C)	38	26	2	10	76	29	+47	54	Promotion to the 1975–76 First Division with restructuring
2	Queen of the South	38	23	7	8	77	33	+44	53	Promotion to the 1975–76 First Division with restructuring
3	Montrose	38	23	7	8	70	37	+33	53	Promotion to the 1975–76 First Division with restructuring
4	Hamilton Academical	38	21	7	10	69	30	+39	49	Promotion to the 1975–76 First Division with restructuring
5	East Fife	38	20	7	11	57	42	+15	47	Promotion to the 1975–76 First Division with restructuring
6	St Mirren	38	19	8	11	74	52	+22	46	Promotion to the 1975–76 First Division with restructuring
7	Clydebank	38	18	8	12	50	40	+10	44	
8	Stirling Albion	38	17	9	12	67	55	+12	43	
9	Berwick Rangers	38	17	6	15	53	49	+4	40	
10	East Stirlingshire	38	16	8	14	56	52	+4	40	
11	Stenhousemuir	38	14	11	13	52	42	+10	39	
12	Albion Rovers	38	16	7	15	72	64	+8	39	
13	Raith Rovers	38	14	9	15	48	44	+4	37	
14	Stranraer	38	12	11	15	47	65	−18	35	
15	Alloa Athletic	38	11	11	16	49	56	−7	33	
16	Queen’s Park	38	10	10	18	41	54	−13	30	
17	Brechin City	38	9	7	22	44	85	−41	25	
18	Meadowbank Thistle	38	9	5	24	26	87	−61	23	
19	Cowdenbeath	38	5	11	22	39	76	−37	21	
20	Forfar Athletic	38	1	7	30	27	102	−75	9	

Source: "1974-1975 Second Division - SPFL Archive". SPFL.
(C) Champions
