= 1973–74 Scottish League Cup =

Tournament details
- Country: Scotland

Final positions
- Champions: Dundee
- Runners-up: Celtic

The 1973–74 Scottish League Cup was the twenty-eighth season of Scotland's second football knockout competition. The competition was won by Dundee, who defeated Celtic in the Final.

== First round ==
=== Group 1 ===
Team	Pld	W	D	L	GF	GA	GD	Pts
Rangers	6	5	0	1	17	6	+11	10
Celtic	6	5	0	1	12	7	+5	10
Arbroath	6	2	0	4	9	13	−4	4
Falkirk	6	0	0	6	6	18	−12	0

Home team	Score	Away team	Date
Celtic	2–1	Arbroath	11 August 1973
Rangers	3–1	Falkirk	11 August 1973
Arbroath	1–2	Rangers	15 August 1973
Falkirk	0–2	Celtic	15 August 1973
Arbroath	3–1	Falkirk	18 August 1973
Rangers	1–2	Celtic	18 August 1973
Celtic	2–1	Falkirk	22 August 1973
Rangers	3–0	Arbroath	22 August 1973
Celtic	1–3	Rangers	25 August 1973
Falkirk	2–3	Arbroath	25 August 1973
Arbroath	1–3	Celtic	29 August 1973
Falkirk	1–5	Rangers	29 August 1973

=== Group 2 ===
Team	Pld	W	D	L	GF	GA	GD	Pts
Hibernian	6	5	0	1	11	6	+5	10
Dumbarton	6	2	1	3	6	6	0	5
Morton	6	2	1	3	8	11	−3	5
Ayr United	6	2	0	4	6	8	−2	4

Home team	Score	Away team	Date
Ayr United	2–0	Dumbarton	11 August 1973
Morton	1–4	Hibernian	11 August 1973
Dumbarton	1–1	Morton	15 August 1973
Hibernian	1–0	Ayr United	15 August 1973
Hibernian	1–0	Dumbarton	18 August 1973
Morton	3–2	Ayr United	18 August 1973
Ayr United	0–2	Hibernian	22 August 1973
Morton	1–0	Dumbarton	22 August 1973
Ayr United	2–1	Morton	25 August 1973
Dumbarton	4–1	Hibernian	25 August 1973
Dumbarton	1–0	Ayr United	29 August 1973
Hibernian	2–1	Morton	29 August 1973

=== Group 3 ===
Team	Pld	W	D	L	GF	GA	GD	Pts
Dundee	6	4	2	0	11	2	+9	10
St Johnstone	6	3	1	2	12	9	+3	7
Heart of Midlothian	6	2	2	2	8	5	+3	6
Partick Thistle	6	0	1	5	2	17	−15	1

Home team	Score	Away team	Date
Dundee	1–0	St Johnstone	11 August 1973
Heart of Midlothian	2–0	Partick Thistle	11 August 1973
Partick Thistle	0–3	Dundee	15 August 1973
St Johnstone	2–1	Heart of Midlothian	15 August 1973
Dundee	2–1	Heart of Midlothian	18 August 1973
St Johnstone	5–1	Partick Thistle	18 August 1973
Dundee	4–0	Partick Thistle	22 August 1973
Heart of Midlothian	4–1	St Johnstone	22 August 1973
Heart of Midlothian	0–0	Dundee	25 August 1973
Partick Thistle	1–3	St Johnstone	25 August 1973
Partick Thistle	0–0	Heart of Midlothian	29 August 1973
St Johnstone	1–1	Dundee	29 August 1973

=== Group 4 ===
Team	Pld	W	D	L	GF	GA	GD	Pts
Motherwell	6	3	1	2	13	6	+7	7
Aberdeen	6	2	3	1	6	4	+2	7
Dundee United	6	3	1	2	9	10	−1	7
East Fife	6	1	1	4	7	15	−8	3

Home team	Score	Away team	Date
Aberdeen	3–1	Motherwell	11 August 1973
East Fife	1–2	Dundee United	11 August 1973
Dundee United	0–0	Aberdeen	15 August 1973
Motherwell	5–0	East Fife	15 August 1973
Aberdeen	1–1	East Fife	18 August 1973
Motherwell	4–0	Dundee United	18 August 1973
Aberdeen	0–2	Dundee United	22 August 1973
East Fife	3–0	Motherwell	22 August 1973
Dundee United	0–3	Motherwell	25 August 1973
East Fife	0–2	Aberdeen	25 August 1973
Dundee United	5–2	East Fife	29 August 1973
Motherwell	0–0	Aberdeen	29 August 1973

=== Group 5 ===
Team	Pld	W	D	L	GF	GA	GD	Pts
Kilmarnock	6	3	2	1	13	4	+9	8
East Stirlingshire	6	3	1	2	7	9	−2	7
Hamilton Academical	6	1	3	2	5	9	−4	5
Queen's Park	6	1	2	3	7	10	−3	4

Home team	Score	Away team	Date
East Stirlingshire	3–2	Kilmarnock	11 August 1973
Hamilton Academical	2–2	Queen's Park	11 August 1973
Kilmarnock	0–0	Hamilton Academical	15 August 1973
Queen's Park	0–1	East Stirlingshire	15 August 1973
East Stirlingshire	2–0	Hamilton Academical	18 August 1973
Kilmarnock	2–0	Queen's Park	18 August 1973
East Stirlingshire	1–3	Queen's Park	22 August 1973
Hamilton Academical	0–4	Kilmarnock	22 August 1973
Hamilton Academical	0–0	East Stirlingshire	25 August 1973
Queen's Park	1–1	Kilmarnock	25 August 1973
Kilmarnock	4–0	East Stirlingshire	29 August 1973
Queen's Park	1–3	Hamilton Academical	29 August 1973

=== Group 6 ===
Team	Pld	W	D	L	GF	GA	GD	Pts
Stirling Albion	6	4	0	2	13	5	+8	8
Raith Rovers	6	3	1	2	10	6	+4	7
Queen of the South	6	3	1	2	11	8	+3	7
Cowdenbeath	6	1	0	5	5	20	−15	2

Home team	Score	Away team	Date
Cowdenbeath	0–1	Queen of the South	11 August 1973
Stirling Albion	1–0	Raith Rovers	11 August 1973
Queen of the South	2–1	Stirling Albion	15 August 1973
Raith Rovers	5–1	Cowdenbeath	15 August 1973
Raith Rovers	2–2	Queen of the South	18 August 1973
Stirling Albion	4–1	Cowdenbeath	18 August 1973
Cowdenbeath	1–0	Raith Rovers	22 August 1973
Stirling Albion	2–0	Queen of the South	22 August 1973
Cowdenbeath	1–5	Stirling Albion	25 August 1973
Queen of the South	1–2	Raith Rovers	25 August 1973
Queen of the South	5–1	Cowdenbeath	29 August 1973
Raith Rovers	1–0	Stirling Albion	29 August 1973

=== Group 7 ===
Team	Pld	W	D	L	GF	GA	GD	Pts
Airdrieonians	6	4	2	0	16	7	+9	10
Clyde	6	3	2	1	8	6	+2	8
Montrose	6	1	2	3	13	15	−2	4
Alloa Athletic	6	1	0	5	3	12	−9	2

Home team	Score	Away team	Date
Airdrieonians	3–0	Alloa Athletic	11 August 1973
Montrose	2–2	Clyde	11 August 1973
Alloa Athletic	3–1	Montrose	15 August 1973
Clyde	0–2	Airdrieonians	15 August 1973
Clyde	1–0	Alloa Athletic	18 August 1973
Montrose	2–2	Airdrieonians	18 August 1973
Airdrieonians	1–1	Clyde	22 August 1973
Montrose	3–0	Alloa Athletic	22 August 1973
Airdrieonians	6–4	Montrose	25 August 1973
Alloa Athletic	0–2	Clyde	25 August 1973
Alloa Athletic	0–2	Airdrieonians	29 August 1973
Clyde	2–1	Montrose	29 August 1973

=== Group 8 ===
Team	Pld	W	D	L	GF	GA	GD	Pts
St Mirren	6	4	1	1	10	9	+1	9
Dunfermline Athletic	6	3	1	2	13	9	+4	7
Berwick Rangers	6	2	1	3	9	9	0	5
Stenhousemuir	6	1	1	4	5	10	−5	3

Home team	Score	Away team	Date
Berwick Rangers	1–1	St Mirren	11 August 1973
Stenhousemuir	1–0	Dunfermline Athletic	11 August 1973
Dunfermline Athletic	3–2	Berwick Rangers	15 August 1973
St Mirren	2–0	Stenhousemuir	15 August 1973
Dunfermline Athletic	5–1	St Mirren	18 August 1973
Stenhousemuir	0–1	Berwick Rangers	18 August 1973
Berwick Rangers	1–2	Dunfermline Athletic	22 August 1973
Stenhousemuir	1–2	St Mirren	22 August 1973
Berwick Rangers	3–1	Stenhousemuir	25 August 1973
St Mirren	2–1	Dunfermline Athletic	25 August 1973
Dunfermline Athletic	2–2	Stenhousemuir	29 August 1973
St Mirren	2–1	Berwick Rangers	29 August 1973

=== Group 9 ===
Team	Pld	W	D	L	GF	GA	GD	Pts
Albion Rovers	4	2	1	1	8	7	+1	5
Forfar Athletic	4	2	1	1	4	3	+1	5
Stranraer	4	2	0	2	7	6	+1	4
Clydebank	4	1	1	2	6	6	0	3
Brechin City	4	1	1	2	5	8	−3	3

Home team	Score	Away team	Date
Forfar Athletic	1–1	Albion Rovers	11 August 1973
Stranraer	2–1	Brechin City	11 August 1973
Albion Rovers	3–1	Clydebank	15 August 1973
Brechin City	1–0	Forfar Athletic	15 August 1973
Albion Rovers	4–1	Brechin City	18 August 1973
Clydebank	3–0	Stranraer	18 August 1973
Clydebank	0–1	Forfar Athletic	22 August 1973
Stranraer	4–0	Albion Rovers	22 August 1973
Brechin City	2–2	Clydebank	25 August 1973
Forfar Athletic	2–1	Stranraer	25 August 1973

== Supplementary round ==
=== First leg ===
Home team	Score	Away team	Date
Albion Rovers	1–0	East Stirlingshire	3 September 1973
Clyde	4–0	Forfar Athletic	3 September 1973

=== Second leg ===
Home team	Score	Away team	Date	Agg
East Stirlingshire	0–0	Albion Rovers	5 September 1973	0–1
Forfar Athletic	1–3	Clyde	5 September 1973	1–7

== 2nd round ==
=== First leg ===
Home team	Score	Away team	Date
Aberdeen	3–0	Stirling Albion	12 September 1973
Albion Rovers	3–0	Airdrieonians	12 September 1973
Clyde	1–0	St Mirren	12 September 1973
Dunfermline Athletic	2–3	Dundee	12 September 1973
Hibernian	3–2	Raith Rovers	12 September 1973
Motherwell	1–2	Celtic	12 September 1973
Rangers	6–0	Dumbarton	12 September 1973
St Johnstone	1–0	Kilmarnock	12 September 1973

=== Second leg ===
Home team	Score	Away team	Date	Agg
Airdrieonians	0–1	Albion Rovers	10 October 1973	0–4
Celtic	0–1	Motherwell	10 October 1973	2–2
Dumbarton	1–2	Rangers	10 October 1973	1–8
Dundee	2–2	Dunfermline Athletic	10 October 1973	5–4
Kilmarnock	3–1	St Johnstone	10 October 1973	3–2
Raith Rovers	0–2	Hibernian	10 October 1973	2–5
St Mirren	4–5	Clyde	10 October 1973	4–6
Stirling Albion	0–3	Aberdeen	10 October 1973	0–6

=== Replay ===
Home team	Score	Away team	Date
Celtic	3–2	Motherwell	29 October 1973

== Quarter-finals ==
=== First leg ===
Home team	Score	Away team	Date
Albion Rovers	2–0	Kilmarnock	30 October 1973
Celtic	3–2	Aberdeen	31 October 1973
Dundee	1–0	Clyde	31 October 1973
Rangers	2–0	Hibernian	31 October 1973

=== Second leg ===
Home team	Score	Away team	Date	Agg
Aberdeen	0–0	Celtic	21 November 1973	2–3
Clyde	2–2	Dundee	21 November 1973	2–3
Hibernian	0–0	Rangers	21 November 1973	0–2
Kilmarnock	5–2	Albion Rovers	24 November 1973	5–4

== Semi-finals ==
=== Ties ===
28 November 1973	Dundee	1–0	Kilmarnock	Hampden Park
	Gemmell	Glasgow Herald		Attendance: 4,682; Referee: R Gordon

5 December 1973	Celtic	3–1	Rangers	Hampden Park
	Hood (3)	Glasgow Herald	MacDonald	Attendance: 54,864

== Final ==
15 December 1973

Dundee	1–0	Celtic
Wallace

Hampden Park, Glasgow
Attendance: 27,924
