= 1976–77 Heart of Midlothian F.C. season =

Heart of Midlothian
1976–77 season
- Manager: John Hagart (to April); Bert Paton (caretaker manager)
- Stadium: Tynecastle Park
- Scottish Premier Division: 9th
- Scottish Cup: Semi-final
- League Cup: Semi-final
- European Cup Winners' Cup: Second Round
- East of Scotland Shield: Winner
- Top goalscorer: League: Willie Pettigrew (16); All: Willie Pettigrew (20)

During the 1976–77 season, Heart of Midlothian F.C. competed in the Scottish Premier Division, the Scottish Cup, the Scottish League Cup, the European Cup Winners' Cup and the East of Scotland Shield.

== Fixtures ==
=== Friendlies ===
5 August 1976 Friendly	Hearts	3–0	Southampton	Tynecastle Park
	Goal		Gary Liddell; Paul O'Brien; Gerry McCoy

13 November 1976 Testimonial	Middlesbrough	0–3	Hearts	Ayresome Park
	Goal		Gary Liddell; Paul O'Brien; Gerry McCoy

=== East of Scotland Shield ===
7 August 1976 Final	Hearts	8–0	Meadowbank Thistle	Tynecastle Park

=== European Cup Winners' Cup ===
15 September 1976 European Cup Winners' Cup R1 1st Leg	Lokomotive Leipzig	2–0	Hearts	Bruno-Plache-Stadion
			Goal	Attendance: 24,000

29 September 1976 European Cup Winners' Cup R1 2nd Leg	Hearts	5–1	Lokomotive Leipzig	Tynecastle Park
			Goal	Attendance: 17,247

20 October 1976 European Cup Winners' Cup R2 1st Leg	Hamburg	4–2	Hearts	Volksparkstadion
			Goal	Attendance: 22,000

3 November 1976 European Cup Winners' Cup R2 2nd Leg	Hearts	1–4	Hamburg	Tynecastle Park
			Goal	Attendance: 24,230

=== League Cup ===
14 August 1976 League Cup Group	Hearts	2–0	Dundee	Tynecastle Park
			Chris Robertson	Attendance: 9,401

18 August 1976 League Cup Group	Partick Thistle	0–2	Hearts	Firhill Park
	Chris Robertson			Attendance: 5,364

21 August 1976 League Cup Group	Hearts	2–1	Motherwell	Tynecastle Park
			Chris Robertson	Attendance: 12,516

25 August 1976 League Cup Group	Hearts	3–3	Partick Thistle	Tynecastle Park
			Chris Robertson	Attendance: 11,333

28 August 1976 League Cup Group	Motherwell	0–2	Hearts	Fir Park
	Chris Robertson			Attendance: 7,874

1 September 1976 League Cup Group	Dundee	2–2	Hearts	Dens Park
			Chris Robertson	Attendance: 4,733

22 September 1976 League Cup Quarter-final 1st Leg	Hearts	4–1	Falkirk	Tynecastle Park
	Chris Robertson			Attendance: 13,368

6 October 1976 League Cup Quarter-final 2nd Leg	Falkirk	4–3	Hearts	Brockville Park
	Chris Robertson			Attendance: 11,004

25 October 1976 League Cup Semi-final	Celtic	2–1	Hearts	Hampden Park
	Chris Robertson			Attendance: 21,816

=== Scottish Cup ===
29 January 1977 Scottish Cup R3	Hearts	1–1	Dumbarton	Tynecastle Park
	Billy Howitt		Roddie MacDonald; Chris Robertson; Peter Marinello; Pat Byrne	Attendance: 7,969

2 February 1977 Scottish Cup R3 Replay	Dumbarton	0–1	Hearts	Boghead Park
	Billy Howitt		Roddie MacDonald; Chris Robertson; Peter Marinello; Pat Byrne	Attendance: 3,000

26 February 1977 Scottish Cup R4	Hearts	1–0	Clydebank	Tynecastle Park
			Stephen Hancock	Attendance: 13,618

12 March 1977 Scottish Cup R5	Hearts	0–0	East Fife	Tynecastle Park
	Billy Howitt		Roddie MacDonald; Chris Robertson; Peter Marinello; Pat Byrne	Attendance: 13,350

15 March 1977 Scottish Cup R5 Replay	East Fife	2–3	Hearts	Bayview Park
	Billy Howitt		Roddie MacDonald; Chris Robertson; Peter Marinello; Pat Byrne	Attendance: 8,658

30 March 1977 Scottish Cup Semi-final	Rangers	2–0	Hearts	Hampden Park
	Billy Howitt		Roddie MacDonald; Chris Robertson; Peter Marinello; Pat Byrne	Attendance: 23,332

=== Scottish Premier Division ===
4 September 1976 Scottish Premier Division	Aberdeen	2–2	Hearts	Pittodrie Stadium
			Jimmy Bone	Attendance: 12,685

11 September 1976 Scottish Premier Division	Hearts	0–0	Partick Thistle	Tynecastle Park
	John Robertson 57'; John Robertson 70'; Jimmy Bone 77'		Ralph Callachan 11'; William Irvine 65'	Attendance: 9,620

18 September 1976 Scottish Premier Division	Celtic	1–1	Hearts	Celtic Park
	Alex MacDonald 9'; John Robertson 29'; Jimmy Bone 47'		David Mitchell 62'	Attendance: 26,131

25 September 1976 Scottish Premier Division	Hearts	2–4	Rangers	Ibrox Park
	Iain Ferguson 36' (pen.)		Jimmy Bone 70'; John Robertson 90'	Attendance: 24,329

2 October 1976 Scottish Premier Division	Hearts	2–2	Kilmarnock	Tynecastle Park
			Roddie MacDonald 8'	Attendance: 9,333

9 October 1976 Scottish Premier Division	Hearts	2–2	Ayr United	Tynecastle Park
			Peter Weir 28'; Peter Weir	Attendance: 10,314

16 October 1976 Scottish Premier Division	Motherwell	1–1	Hearts	Fir Park
				Attendance: 7,932

23 October 1976 Scottish Premier Division	Hearts	1–2	Dundee United	Tynecastle Park
	Frank McGarvey 44'		Jimmy Bone 48'	Attendance: 11,516

30 October 1976 Scottish Premier Division	Hibernian	1–1	Hearts	Easter Road
	David Dodds 36'			Attendance: 23,773

10 November 1976 Scottish Premier Division	Hearts	2–1	Aberdeen	Tynecastle Park
	John Robertson 13', 27' (pen.)			Attendance: 10,079

20 November 1976 Scottish Premier Division	Hearts	3–4	Celtic	Tynecastle Park
	Bobby Thomson 66'		John Robertson	Attendance: 19,775

27 November 1976 Scottish Premier Division	Hearts	1–2	Rangers	Tynecastle Park
	Gary Mackay 66' (pen.)		Tosh McKinlay 18'; McCall 57', 73'	Attendance: 18,321

30 November 1976 Scottish Premier Division	Partick Thistle	2–1	Hearts	Firhill Park
	Doug Rougvie 33'; Neil Simpson 89'			Attendance: 2,809

11 December 1976 Scottish Premier Division	Ayr United	0–1	Hearts	Somerset Park
	Gary Mackay 21' (pen.), 67'		Frank McAvennie 12'; Frank McDougall	Attendance: 5,126

18 December 1976 Scottish Premier Division	Hearts	2–1	Motherwell	Tynecastle Park
	Sandy Clark 34', 70'; John MacDonald 78'			Attendance: 8,978

27 December 1976 Scottish Premier Division	Dundee United	1–1	Hearts	Tannadice Park
				Attendance: 9,615

3 January 1977 Scottish Premier Division	Aberdeen	4–1	Hearts	Pittodrie Stadium
	John Robertson		Brian McClair 26', 81'; James Dobbin	Attendance: 19,754

8 January 1977 Scottish Premier Division	Hearts	1–0	Partick Thistle	Tynecastle Park
	Johannes Edvaldsson		Jimmy Bone	Attendance: 8,693

22 January 1977 Scottish Premier Division	Rangers	3–2	Hearts	Ibrox Park
	Ian Gibson 19'		Donald Park 31'; George Cowie	Attendance: 20,966

26 January 1977 Scottish Premier Division	Hearts	0–1	Hibernian	Tynecastle Park
	Donald Park		William Irvine	Attendance: 24,068

5 February 1977 Scottish Premier Division	Hearts	4–0	Kilmarnock	Tynecastle Park
	Robert Glennie; McCall; Iain Ferguson; Fraser		John Robertson	Attendance: 7,286

7 February 1977 Scottish Premier Division	Celtic	5–1	Hearts	Celtic Park
	Derek O'Connor 88'; John Robertson 91'		Ally McCoist 31'; Bobby Williamson 47'	Attendance: 20,192

15 February 1977 Scottish Premier Division	Kilmarnock	2–1	Hearts	Rugby Park
	John Robertson 36', 71'		John Gahagan 28'	Attendance: 3,182

19 February 1977 Scottish Premier Division	Motherwell	2–1	Hearts	Fir Park
	Brian McClair 22', 37', 79'; John Colquhoun 75'		Donald Park 87'	Attendance: 6,900

5 March 1977 Scottish Premier Division	Hearts	1–1	Dundee United	Tynecastle Park
	[/Eamonn Bannon 20'; Tommy Coyne 24', 82'		Walter Kidd 7'	Attendance: 7,820

19 March 1977 Scottish Premier Division	Hearts	1–1	Aberdeen	Tynecastle Park
	Steve Clarke 65'		Willie Johnston 87'	Attendance: 8,183

23 March 1977 Scottish Premier Division	Hibernian	3–1	Hearts	Easter Road
	John Robertson 18'; Jimmy Bone 45'		Rowan Alexander 66'	Attendance: 13,625

26 March 1977 Scottish Premier Division	Partick Thistle	2–0	Hearts	Firhill Park
			John Robertson 8' (pen.)	Attendance: 5,117

2 April 1977 Scottish Premier Division	Hearts	0–3	Celtic	Tynecastle Park
				Attendance: 16,801

6 April 1977 Scottish Premier Division	Hearts	1–2	Ayr United	Tynecastle Park
	Ian Porteous 46'		John Robertson 62'	Attendance: 11,044

9 April 1977 Scottish Premier Division	Hearts	1–3	Rangers	Tynecastle Park
				Attendance: 12,021

13 April 1977 Scottish Premier Division	Hearts	2–2	Hibernian	Tynecastle Park
				Attendance: 10,686

16 April 1977 Scottish Premier Division	Kilmarnock	2–2	Hearts	Rugby Park
	Roddie MacDonald; Donald Park 82'		John Brogan 54'; Raymond Blair 83'	Attendance: 2,471

20 April 1977 Scottish Premier Division	Dundee United	1–2	Hearts	Tannadice Park
			Stewart McKimmie 62'	Attendance: 3,262

23 April 1977 Scottish Premier Division	Ayr United	1–1	Hearts	Somerset Park
	Willie Johnston		Tommy Burns 45'	Attendance: 3,871

30 April 1977 Scottish Premier Division	Hearts	3–2	Motherwell	Tynecastle Park
	Gary Mackay 10'		Jim McInally 50'	Attendance: 6,214

== Scottish Premier Division table ==
Pos	Team	Pld	W	D	L	GF	GA	GD	Pts	Qualification or relegation
6	Hibernian	36	8	18	10	34	35	−1	34	
7	Motherwell	36	10	12	14	57	60	−3	32	
8	Ayr United	36	11	8	17	44	68	−24	30	
9	Heart of Midlothian (R)	36	7	13	16	49	66	−17	27	Relegation to the 1977–78 Scottish First Division
10	Kilmarnock (R)	36	4	9	23	32	71	−39	17	Relegation to the 1977–78 Scottish First Division

Source: Statto
Rules for classification: 1) points; 2) goal difference; 3) number of goals scored.
(R) Relegated

== Squad information ==
No.	Pos	Nat	Player	Total		Scottish Premier Division		Scottish Cup		Scottish League Cup	
No.	Pos	Nat	Player	Apps	Goals	Apps	Goals	Apps	Goals	Apps	Goals
	MF	(Ireland) EIR	Pat Byrne	0	0	0	0	0	0	0	0
	DF	(Scotland) SCO	Peter Shields	0	0	0	0	0	0	0	0
	DF	(Scotland) SCO	Stewart MacLaren	0	0	0	0	0	0	0	0
	MF	(Scotland) SCO	Roddie MacDonald	0	0	0	0	0	0	0	0
	GK	(Scotland) SCO	Henry Smith	0	0	0	0	0	0	0	0
	FW	(Scotland) SCO	Willie Pettigrew	0	0	0	0	0	0	0	0
	FW	(Scotland) SCO	Chris Robertson	0	0	0	0	0	0	0	0
	DF	(Scotland) SCO	Walter Kidd	0	0	0	0	0	0	0	0
	MF	(Scotland) SCO	Derek Addison	0	0	0	0	0	0	0	0
	MF	(Scotland) SCO	Alex Hamill	0	0	0	0	0	0	0	0
	FW	(Scotland) SCO	Gerry McCoy	0	0	0	0	0	0	0	0
	MF	(Scotland) SCO	Dave Bowman	0	0	0	0	0	0	0	0
	MF	(Scotland) SCO	Alex MacDonald	0	0	0	0	0	0	0	0
	MF	(Scotland) SCO	Gary Mackay	0	0	0	0	0	0	0	0
	MF	(Scotland) SCO	Peter Marinello	0	0	0	0	0	0	0	0
	DF	(England) ENG	Brian McNeill	0	0	0	0	0	0	0	0
	FW	(Scotland) SCO	Gary Liddell	0	0	0	0	0	0	0	0
	FW	(Scotland) SCO	Derek O'Connor	0	0	0	0	0	0	0	0
	DF	(Scotland) SCO	Colin More	0	0	0	0	0	0	0	0
	GK	(Scotland) SCO	John Brough	0	0	0	0	0	0	0	0
	DF	(Scotland) SCO	Stuart Gauld	0	0	0	0	0	0	0	0
	DF	(Scotland) SCO	Frank Liddell	0	0	0	0	0	0	0	0
	FW	(Scotland) SCO	Paul O'Brien	0	0	0	0	0	0	0	0
	FW	(Scotland) SCO	Derek Strickland	0	0	0	0	0	0	0	0
	FW	(Scotland) SCO	John Robertson	0	0	0	0	0	0	0	0

== See also ==
- List of Heart of Midlothian F.C. seasons
