= 1977–78 Heart of Midlothian F.C. season =

Heart of Midlothian
1977–78 season
- Manager: Willie Ormond
- Stadium: Tynecastle Park
- Scottish First Division: 2nd
- Scottish Cup: Fourth Round
- League Cup: Semi-final
- East of Scotland Shield: Finalists
- Top goalscorer: League: Willie Pettigrew (16); All: Willie Pettigrew (20)

During the 1977–78 season, Heart of Midlothian F.C. competed in the Scottish First Division, the Scottish Cup, the Scottish League Cup and the East of Scotland Shield

== Fixtures ==
=== Friendlies ===
3 August 1977 Friendly	East Fife	2–1	Hearts	Bayview Park
	Goal		Gerry McCoy; Gary Liddell; Peter Shields; Gerry McCoy

5 August 1977 Friendly	Hearts	2–1	OFK Kikinda	Tynecastle Park
	Goal		Chris Robertson	Attendance: 8,000

9 August 1977 Friendly	Hearts	1–0	Middlesbrough	Tynecastle Park
	Chris Robertson			Attendance: 7,620

=== League Cup ===
29 August 1977 League Cup round 2 1st Leg	Hearts	1–0	Stenhousemuir	Tynecastle Park
			Chris Robertson	Attendance: 6,307

3 September 1977 League Cup round 2 2nd Leg	Stenhousemuir	0–5	Hearts	Ochilview Park
	Chris Robertson			Attendance: 3,362

5 October 1977 League Cup round 3 1st Leg	Hearts	3–0	Morton	Tynecastle Park
			Chris Robertson	Attendance: 11,567

26 October 1977 League Cup round 3 2nd Leg	Morton	2–0	Hearts	Cappielow Park
	Chris Robertson			Attendance: 5,962

9 November 1977 League Cup Quarter-final 1st Leg	Dundee United	3–1	Hearts	Tannadice Park
			Chris Robertson	Attendance: 7,286

16 November 1977 League Cup Quarter-final 2nd Leg	Hearts	2–0	Dundee United	Tynecastle Park
	Chris Robertson			Attendance: 7,245

1 March 1978 League Cup Semi-final	Celtic	2–0	Hearts	Hampden Park
	Chris Robertson			Attendance: 18,940

=== Scottish Cup ===
6 February 1978 Scottish Cup R3	Airdireonians	2–3	Hearts	Broomfield Park
	Billy Howitt		Roddie MacDonald; Chris Robertson; Peter Marinello; Pat Byrne	Attendance: 6,893

18 February 1978 Scottish Cup R4	Dumbarton	1–1	Hearts	Boghead Park
			Stephen Hancock	Attendance: 6,677

27 February 1978 Scottish Cup R4 Replay	Hearts	0–1	Dumbarton	Tynecastle Park
			Stephen Hancock	Attendance: 12,906

=== East of Scotland Shield ===
23 August 1977 Semi Final	Hearts	1–0	Berwick Rangers	Tynecastle Park
	Derek Rodier 73'		Roddie MacDonald 17'; Gordon Rae 82' (og.)

7 May 1978 Final	Hibernian	0–1	Hearts	Easter Road
	Derek Rodier 73'		Roddie MacDonald 17'; Gordon Rae 82' (og.)	Attendance: 16,000

=== Scottish First Division ===
13 August 1977 Scottish First Division	Dumbarton	2–2	Hearts	Boghead Park
	Doug Considine		Gary Liddell	Attendance: 4,448

20 August 1977 Scottish First Division	Hearts	2–1	Dundee	Tynecastle Park
	Derek O'Connor		Larnach	Attendance: 11,761

27 August 1977 Scottish First Division	Kilmarnock	1–1	Hearts	Rugby Park
	Derek O'Connor; Willie Pettigrew; Gary Mackay; Dave Bowman; Pat Byrne		Alexander McNaughton	Attendance: 5,003

10 September 1977 Scottish First Division	Hearts	4–1	East Fife	Tynecastle Park
	Gary Thompson		Derek O'Connor	Attendance: 8,874

14 September 1977 Scottish First Division	Queen of the South	3–3	Hearts	Palmerston Park
	Dave Bowman			Attendance: 4,227

17 September 1977 Scottish First Division	Hearts	3–0	St Johnstone	Tynecastle Park
	Willie Pettigrew; Derek O'Connor; Pat Byrne; Sandy Jardine		Ronald	Attendance: 8,949

24 September 1977 Scottish First Division	Stirling Albion	2–4	Hearts	Annfield Stadium
	Colin Harris 63'			Attendance: 6,728

28 September 1977 Scottish First Division	Hearts	1–0	Alloa Athletic	Tynecastle Park
	Derek O'Connor		John Donnelly	Attendance: 7,547

1 October 1977 Scottish First Division	Hearts	0–2	Hamilton Academical	Tynecastle Park
	Roddie MacDonald; Holt og.' John Robertson			Attendance: 8,616

8 October 1977 Scottish First Division	Morton	5–3	Hearts	Cappielow Park
	Thomas Donnelly		Alex MacDonald; Pat Byrne; Derek O'Connor	Attendance: 7,140

15 October 1977 Scottish First Division	Hearts	3–2	Airdrieonians	Tynecastle Park
	Derek O'Connor; Dave Bowman; Alex MacDonald; Willie Johnston		Hugh Hamill	Attendance: 8,252

19 October 1977 Scottish First Division	Montrose	3–1	Hearts	Links Park
	Alexander O'Hara		John Robertson	Attendance: 2,049

22 October 1977 Scottish First Division	Hearts	2–1	Dumbarton	Tynecastle Park
	Derek O'Connor; Sandy Jardine		Flood; Flood; Gary Faulds; Blair Millar	Attendance: 8,942

29 October 1977 Scottish First Division	Dundee	1–1	Hearts	Dens Park
			Gary Mackay; Derek O'Connor; John Robertson	Attendance: 9,074

5 November 1977 Scottish First Division	Hearts	1–2	Kilmarnock	Tynecastle Park
	Willie Johnston; John Robertson; John Robertson		Thomas Ward	Attendance: 7,703

12 November 1977 Scottish First Division	East Fife	2–0	Hearts	Bayview Park
	Raymond Blair		Derek O'Connor	Attendance: 3,898

19 November 1977 Scottish First Division	St Johnstone	0–1	Hearts	Muirton Park
	Gary Mackay 13'; Willie Johnston 70' (pen.)

26 November 1977 Scottish First Division	Hearts	2–0	Stirling Albion	Tynecastle Park
	Robert Reilly; Robert Reilly		Alex MacDonald; Willie Pettigrew; Willie Pettigrew	Attendance: 8,234

10 December 1977 Scottish First Division	Hearts	1–1	Morton	Tynecastle Park
			Derek O'Connor; Willie Pettigrew; Alex MacDonald	Attendance: 12,033

17 December 1977 Scottish First Division	Airdireonians	2–4	Hearts	Broomfield Park
	Willie Pettigrew			Attendance: 2,987

24 December 1977 Scottish First Division	Arbroath	0–7	Hearts	Gayfield Park
			Willie Pettigrew	Attendance: 3,165

31 December 1977 Scottish First Division	Hearts	3–0	Kilmarnock	Tynecastle Park
	Willie Pettigrew; Derek O'Connor		Thomas Donnelly	Attendance: 13,063

2 January 1978 Scottish First Division	East Fife	1–2	Hearts	Bayview Park
				Attendance: 7,774

7 January 1978 Scottish First Division	Hearts	2–2	Dundee	Tynecastle Park
			Donald Park	Attendance: 13,399

14 January 1978 Scottish First Division	Hearts	1–0	Queen of the South	Tynecastle Park
	Robert Forrest 50' (pen.); Jenkins 89'		Roddie MacDonald	Attendance: 12,083

4 February 1978 Scottish First Division	Hearts	1–0	Hamilton Academical	Tynecastle Park
	Derek O'Connor; Willie Pettigrew; Gary Mackay; Dave Bowman; Pat Byrne		Alexander McNaughton	Attendance: 7,516

25 February 1978 Scottish First Division	Hearts	3–0	Airdrieonians	Tynecastle Park
			John Robertson; John Robertson; John Robertson	Attendance: 9,348

4 March 1978 Scottish First Division	Hearts	0–0	Dumbarton	Tynecastle Park
	Derek O'Connor		Robert McCulley; Mackin	Attendance: 6,736

8 March 1978 Scottish First Division	Morton	0–1	Hearts	Cappielow Park
	John Robertson; Gary Mackay; Roddie MacDonald		Tommy O'Neill	Attendance: 7,513

11 March 1978 Scottish First Division	Alloa Athletic	0–2	Hearts	Recreation Park
	John Robertson; Willie Pettigrew; John Robertson; John Robertson			Attendance: 4,484

15 March 1978 Scottish First Division	Stirling Albion	1–2	Hearts	Annfield Stadium
	Colin Harris 33'; Jim Kerr 56' (pen.); James Marshall 68'; More 89'		Willie Johnston 6'; Willie Johnston 72' (pen.)	Attendance: 4,587

18 March 1978 Scottish First Division	Hearts	2–2	Montrose	Tynecastle Park
			Gary Mackay 44' (pen.); John Robertson 84'	Attendance: 8,391

25 March 1978 Scottish First Division	Montrose	0–0	Hearts	Links Park
	John Robertson; Derek O'Connor			Attendance: 2,550

2 April 1978 Scottish First Division	Hamilton Academical	0–2	Hearts	Douglas Park
	Morton; Raymond Blair		Dave Bowman	Attendance: 5,132

8 April 1978 Scottish First Division	Hearts	3–2	Arbroath	Tynecastle Park
	John Robertson; John Robertson		Gerard McCabe; Gerard McCabe	Attendance: 9,360

12 April 1978 Scottish First Division	St Johnstone	0–2	Hearts	Muirton Park
	William Garner		Alex MacDonald	Attendance: 4,224

15 April 1978 Scottish First Division	Queen of the South	1–1	Hearts	Palmerston Park
	John Robertson; John Robertson; John Robertson		Norman McCathie; Stephen Morrison; Stewart	Attendance: 3,159

22 April 1978 Scottish First Division	Hearts	2–1	Alloa Athletic	Tynecastle Park
			John Robertson; Derek O'Connor; Gary Mackay; John Robertson	Attendance: 3,494

29 April 1978 Scottish First Division	Arbroath	0–1	Hearts	Gayfield Park
	Willie Johnston; Derek O'Connor			Attendance: 8,389

== Scottish First Division table ==
Pos	Team	Pld	W	D	L	GF	GA	GD	Pts	Promotion or relegation
1	Morton (C, P)	39	25	8	6	85	42	+43	58	Promotion to the Premier Division
2	Heart of Midlothian (P)	39	24	10	5	77	42	+35	58	Promotion to the Premier Division
3	Dundee	39	25	7	7	91	44	+47	57	
4	Dumbarton	39	16	17	6	65	48	+17	49	
5	Stirling Albion	39	15	12	12	60	52	+8	42	

Source: RSSSF and statto
Rules for classification: 1) points; 2) goal difference; 3) number of goals scored.
(C) Champions; (P) Promoted

== Squad information ==
No.	Pos	Nat	Player	Total		Scottish Premier Division		Scottish Cup		Scottish League Cup	
No.	Pos	Nat	Player	Apps	Goals	Apps	Goals	Apps	Goals	Apps	Goals
	MF	(Ireland) EIR	Pat Byrne	0	0	0	0	0	0	0	0
	DF	(Scotland) SCO	Peter Shields	0	0	0	0	0	0	0	0
	DF	(Scotland) SCO	Stewart MacLaren	0	0	0	0	0	0	0	0
	MF	(Scotland) SCO	Roddie MacDonald	0	0	0	0	0	0	0	0
	GK	(Scotland) SCO	Henry Smith	0	0	0	0	0	0	0	0
	FW	(Scotland) SCO	Willie Pettigrew	0	0	0	0	0	0	0	0
	FW	(Scotland) SCO	Chris Robertson	0	0	0	0	0	0	0	0
	DF	(Scotland) SCO	Walter Kidd	0	0	0	0	0	0	0	0
	MF	(Scotland) SCO	Derek Addison	0	0	0	0	0	0	0	0
	MF	(Scotland) SCO	Alex Hamill	0	0	0	0	0	0	0	0
	FW	(Scotland) SCO	Gerry McCoy	0	0	0	0	0	0	0	0
	MF	(Scotland) SCO	Dave Bowman	0	0	0	0	0	0	0	0
	MF	(Scotland) SCO	Alex MacDonald	0	0	0	0	0	0	0	0
	MF	(Scotland) SCO	Gary Mackay	0	0	0	0	0	0	0	0
	MF	(Scotland) SCO	Peter Marinello	0	0	0	0	0	0	0	0
	DF	(England) ENG	Brian McNeill	0	0	0	0	0	0	0	0
	FW	(Scotland) SCO	Gary Liddell	0	0	0	0	0	0	0	0
	FW	(Scotland) SCO	Derek O'Connor	0	0	0	0	0	0	0	0
	DF	(Scotland) SCO	Colin More	0	0	0	0	0	0	0	0
	GK	(Scotland) SCO	John Brough	0	0	0	0	0	0	0	0
	DF	(Scotland) SCO	Stuart Gauld	0	0	0	0	0	0	0	0
	DF	(Scotland) SCO	Frank Liddell	0	0	0	0	0	0	0	0
	FW	(Scotland) SCO	Paul O'Brien	0	0	0	0	0	0	0	0
	FW	(Scotland) SCO	Derek Strickland	0	0	0	0	0	0	0	0
	FW	(Scotland) SCO	John Robertson	0	0	0	0	0	0	0	0

== See also ==
- List of Heart of Midlothian F.C. seasons
