= 1978–79 Heart of Midlothian F.C. season =

Heart of Midlothian
1978–79 season
- Manager: Willie Ormond
- Stadium: Tynecastle Stadium
- Scottish Premier Division: 10th
- Scottish Cup: Third Round
- League Cup: Second Round
- East of Scotland Shield: Winner
- Top goalscorer: League: Willie Pettigrew (16); All: Willie Pettigrew (20)

During the 1978–79 season, Heart of Midlothian F.C. competed in the Scottish Premier Division, the Scottish Cup, the Scottish League Cup, the Anglo-Scottish Cup and the East of Scotland Shield.

== Fixtures ==
=== Friendlies ===
9 August 1978 Friendly	Hearts	3–0	Middlesbrough	Tynecastle Park
	Goal		Gary Liddell; Paul O'Brien; Gerry McCoy

19 November 1978 Testimonial	East Fife	0–0	Hearts	Bayview Park
	Goal		Gary Liddell; Paul O'Brien; Gerry McCoy

=== Tennents Caledonian Cup ===
5 August 1978 Tennents Caledonian Cup Semi-final	Rangers	3–1	Hearts	Ibrox Park
	Goal		Gerry McCoy; Gary Liddell; Peter Shields; Gerry McCoy

6 August 1978 Tennents Caledonian Cup 3rd place match	Hearts	2–0	West Bromwich Albion	Tynecastle Park
	Goal		Chris Robertson

=== Anglo-Scottish Cup ===
16 August 1978 Anglo-Scottish Cup	Partick Thistle	2–1	Hearts	Firhill Park
			Goal

23 August 1978 Anglo-Scottish Cup	Hearts	1–1	Partick Thistle	Tynecastle Park
			Goal

=== League Cup ===
30 August 1978 League Cup R2 1st leg	Hearts	1–3	Morton	Tynecastle Park
			Chris Robertson	Attendance: 6,729

2 September 1978 League Cup R2 2nd leg	Morton	4–1	Hearts	Cappielow Park
	Chris Robertson			Attendance: 5,249

=== Scottish Cup ===
27 January 1979 Scottish Cup R3	Raith Rovers	0–2	Hearts	Stark's Park
	Billy Howitt		Roddie MacDonald; Chris Robertson; Peter Marinello; Pat Byrne	Attendance: 10,000

3 March 1979 Scottish Cup R4	Hearts	1–1	Morton	Tynecastle Park
			Stephen Hancock	Attendance: 9,000

5 March 1979 Scottish Cup R4 replay	Morton	0–1	Hearts	Cappielow Park
	Billy Howitt		Roddie MacDonald; Chris Robertson; Peter Marinello; Pat Byrne	Attendance: 8,000

10 March 1979 Scottish Cup R5	Hibernian	2–1	Hearts	Easter Road
	Billy Howitt		Roddie MacDonald; Chris Robertson; Peter Marinello; Pat Byrne	Attendance: 22,618

=== East of Scotland Shield ===
10 October 1978 Final	Hearts	1–3	Meadowbank Thistle	Tynecastle Park
			Willie Pettigrew; Pat Byrne; Willie Pettigrew; Willie Pettigrew; Willie Pettigrew

=== Scottish Premier Division ===
12 August 1978 Scottish Premier Division	Hearts	1–4	Aberdeen	Tynecastle Park
			Jimmy Bone	Attendance: 11,091

19 August 1978 Scottish Premier Division	Celtic	4–0	Hearts	Celtic Park
	John Robertson 57'; John Robertson 70'; Jimmy Bone 77'		Ralph Callachan 11'; William Irvine 65'	Attendance: 22,907

26 August 1978 Scottish Premier Division	Hearts	1–1	Hibernian	Tynecastle Park
	Alex MacDonald 9'; John Robertson 29'; Jimmy Bone 47'		David Mitchell 62'	Attendance: 19,663

9 September 1978 Scottish Premier Division	Partick Thistle	3–2	Hearts	Firhill Park
	Iain Ferguson 36' (pen.)		Jimmy Bone 70'; John Robertson 90'	Attendance: 5,117

16 September 1978 Scottish Premier Division	Hearts	1–1	Morton	Tynecastle Park
			Roddie MacDonald 8'	Attendance: 6,945

23 September 1978 Scottish Premier Division	Motherwell	0–1	Hearts	Fir Park
			Peter Weir 28'; Peter Weir	Attendance: 5,219

30 September 1978 Scottish Premier Division	Dundee United	3–1	Hearts	Tannadice Park
				Attendance: 6,312

7 October 1978 Scottish Premier Division	Hearts	1–1	St Mirren	Tynecastle Park
	Frank McGarvey 44'		Jimmy Bone 48'	Attendance: 9,192

14 October 1978 Scottish Premier Division	Hearts	0–0	Rangers	Tynecastle Park
	David Dodds 36'			Attendance: 17,910

21 October 1978 Scottish Premier Division	Aberdeen	1–2	Hearts	Pittodrie Stadium
	John Robertson 13', 27' (pen.)			Attendance: 13,707

28 October 1978 Scottish Premier Division	Hearts	2–0	Celtic	Tynecastle Park
	Bobby Thomson 66'		John Robertson	Attendance: 19,269

4 November 1978 Scottish Premier Division	Hibernian	1–2	Hearts	Easter Road
	Gary Mackay 66' (pen.)		Tosh McKinlay 18'; McCall 57', 73'	Attendance: 20,120

11 November 1978 Scottish Premier Division	Hearts	0–1	Partick Thistle	Tynecastle Park
	Doug Rougvie 33'; Neil Simpson 89'			Attendance: 11,967

18 November 1978 Scottish Premier Division	Morton	3–2	Hearts	Cappielow Park
	Gary Mackay 21' (pen.), 67'		Frank McAvennie 12'; Frank McDougall	Attendance: 7,765

25 November 1978 Scottish Premier Division	Hearts	3–2	Motherwell	Tynecastle Park
	Sandy Clark 34', 70'; John MacDonald 78'			Attendance: 8,984

9 December 1978 Scottish Premier Division	St Mirren	4–0	Hearts	St Mirren Park, Love Street
				Attendance: 5,183

16 December 1978 Scottish Premier Division	Rangers	5–3	Hearts	Ibrox Park
	John Robertson		Brian McClair 26', 81'; James Dobbin	Attendance: 19,754

23 December 1978 Scottish Premier Division	Hearts	0–0	Aberdeen	Tynecastle Park
	Johannes Edvaldsson		Jimmy Bone	Attendance: 9,199

20 January 1979 Scottish Premier Division	Motherwell	3–2	Hearts	Tannadice Park
	Ian Gibson 19'		Donald Park 31'; George Cowie	Attendance: 3,881

10 February 1979 Scottish Premier Division	Hearts	1–2	St Mirren	Tynecastle Park
	Donald Park		William Irvine	Attendance: 7,803

24 February 1979 Scottish Premier Division	Hearts	3–2	Rangers	Tynecastle Park
	Robert Glennie; McCall; Iain Ferguson; Fraser		John Robertson	Attendance: 16,050

17 March 1979 Scottish Premier Division	Hibernian	1–1	Hearts	Easter Road
	Derek O'Connor 88'; John Robertson 91'		Ally McCoist 31'; Bobby Williamson 47'	Attendance: 13,297

28 March 1979 Scottish Premier Division	Hearts	1–2	Hibernian	Tynecastle Park
	John Robertson 36', 71'		John Gahagan 28'	Attendance: 16,042

31 March 1979 Scottish Premier Division	Morton	2–2	Hearts	Cappielow Park
	Brian McClair 22', 37', 79'; John Colquhoun 75'		Donald Park 87'	Attendance: 5,767

4 April 1979 Scottish Premier Division	Hearts	2–0	Dundee United	Tynecastle Park
	Eamonn Bannon 20'; Tommy Coyne 24', 82'		Walter Kidd 7'	Attendance: 6,480

7 April 1979 Scottish Premier Division	Hearts	3–0	Motherwell	Tynecastle Park
	Steve Clarke 65'		Willie Johnston 87'	Attendance: 6,651

11 April 1979 Scottish Premier Division	Hearts	0–3	Partick Thistle	Tynecastle Park
	John Robertson 18'; Jimmy Bone 45'		Rowan Alexander 66'	Attendance: 8,265

14 April 1979 Scottish Premier Division	Hearts	0–3	Dundee United	Tynecastle Park
			John Robertson 8' (pen.)	Attendance: 7,564

18 April 1979 Scottish Premier Division	Hearts	0–3	Celtic	Tynecastle Park
				Attendance: 10,633

21 April 1979 Scottish Premier Division	St Mirren	2–1	Hearts	St Mirren Park, Love Street
	Ian Porteous 46'		John Robertson 62'	Attendance: 6,049

25 April 1979 Scottish Premier Division	Dundee United	2–1	Hearts	Tannadice Park
				Attendance: 6,005

28 April 1979 Scottish Premier Division	Rangers	4–0	Hearts	Ibrox Park
				Attendance: 20,464

2 May 1979 Scottish Premier Division	Aberdeen	5–0	Hearts	Pittodrie Stadium
	Roddie MacDonald; Donald Park 82'		John Brogan 54'; Raymond Blair 83'	Attendance: 6,602

5 May 1979 Scottish Premier Division	Partick Thistle	2–0	Hearts	Firhill Park
			Stewart McKimmie 62'	Attendance: 4,605

7 May 1979 Scottish Premier Division	Hearts	0–1	Morton	Tynecastle Stadium
	Willie Johnston		Tommy Burns 45'	Attendance: 2,253

14 May 1979 Scottish Premier Division	Celtic	1–0	Hearts	Celtic Park
	Gary Mackay 10'		Jim McInally 50'	Attendance: 16,507

== Scottish Premier Division table ==
Pos	Team	Pld	W	D	L	GF	GA	GD	Pts	Qualification or relegation
6	St Mirren	36	15	6	15	45	41	+4	36	
7	Morton	36	12	12	12	52	53	−1	36	
8	Partick Thistle	36	13	8	15	42	39	+3	34	
9	Heart of Midlothian (R)	36	8	7	21	39	71	−32	23	Relegation to the 1979–80 Scottish First Division
10	Motherwell (R)	36	5	7	24	33	86	−53	17	Relegation to the 1979–80 Scottish First Division

Source: Statto and RSSSF
Rules for classification: 1) points; 2) goal difference; 3) number of goals scored.
(R) Relegated

== Squad information ==
No.	Pos	Nat	Player	Total		Scottish Premier Division		Scottish Cup		Scottish League Cup	
No.	Pos	Nat	Player	Apps	Goals	Apps	Goals	Apps	Goals	Apps	Goals
	GK	(Scotland) SCO	John Brough	6	0	2	0	2	0	2	0
	GK	(Scotland) SCO	Thomson Allan	16	0	16	0	0	0	0	0
	FW	(Scotland) SCO	Willie Gibson	39	0	34	0	4	0	1	0
	MF	(Scotland) SCO	Cammy Fraser	39	0	36	0	3	0	0	0
	MF	(Scotland) SCO	Jim Brown	32	0	26	0	4	0	2	0
	FW	(Scotland) SCO	Drew Busby	31	0	26	0	3	0	2	0
	DF	(Scotland) SCO	Walter Kidd	34	0	30	0	4	0	0	0
	DF	(Scotland) SCO	Bobby Prentice	13	0	12	0	0	0	1	0
	DF	(Scotland) SCO	Jim Jeffries	34	0	28	0	4	0	2	0
	MF	(Scotland) SCO	Malcolm Robertson	35	0	29	0	4	0	2	0
	MF	(Scotland) SCO	Graham Shaw	12	0	8	0	2	0	2	0
	DF	(Scotland) SCO	Ian Black	17	0	14	0	3	0	0	0
	DF	(Scotland) SCO	Frank Liddell	36	0	31	0	3	0	2	0
	FW	(Scotland) SCO	Derek O'Connor	22	0	18	0	4	0	0	0
	DF	(Scotland) SCO	Colin More	4	0	4	0	0	0	0	0
	MF	(Scotland) SCO	John Craig	22	0	19	0	3	0	0	0
	MF	(Scotland) SCO	Dave McNicoll	20	0	17	0	1	0	2	0
	MF	(Scotland) SCO	Lawrie Tierney	15	0	14	0	0	0	1	0
	MF	(Scotland) SCO	Eamonn Bannon	21	0	19	0	0	0	2	0
	GK	(Scotland) SCO	Ray Dunlop	20	0	18	0	2	0	0	0
	MF	(Scotland) SCO	Denis McQuade	24	0	23	0	1	0	0	0
	FW	(Scotland) SCO	Rab Stewart	5	0	5	0	0	0	0	0
	FW	(Scotland) SCO	David Scott	5	0	5	0	0	0	0	0
	FW	(Scotland) SCO	Des O'Sullivan	2	0	2	0	0	0	0	0
	FW	(Scotland) SCO	Donald Park	4	0	3	0	0	0	1	0
	DF	(Scotland) SCO	Paul Rodger	3	0	2	0	0	0	1	0
	FW	(Scotland) SCO	Kenny McLeod	3	0	3	0	0	0	0	0
	FW	(Scotland) SCO	Gordon James Smith	3	0	1	0	0	0	2	0
	FW	(Scotland) SCO	Ian Paterson	2	0	2	0	0	0	0	0
	MF	(Scotland) SCO	Peter Johnstone	1	0	1	0	0	0	0	0

== See also ==
- List of Heart of Midlothian F.C. seasons
