= 1981–82 Heart of Midlothian F.C. season =

Heart of Midlothian
1981–82 season
- Chairman: Wallace Mercer
- Manager: Tony Ford (to 9 December); Alex MacDonald (from 10 December)
- Stadium: Tynecastle Stadium
- Scottish First Division: 3rd
- Scottish Cup: Fourth Round
- League Cup: Section 3
- East of Scotland Shield: Winner
- Top goalscorer: League: Willie Pettigrew (16); All: Willie Pettigrew (20)

During the 1981–82 season, Heart of Midlothian F.C. competed in the Scottish First Division, the Scottish Cup, the Scottish League Cup and the East of Scotland Shield

== Fixtures ==
=== Friendlies ===
25 July 1981 Friendly	North Shields	2–4	Hearts	Appleby Park
	Goal		Gerry McCoy; Gary Liddell; Peter Shields; Gerry McCoy	Attendance: 600

27 July 1981 Friendly	Whitley Bay F.C.	1–1	Hearts	Hillheads Park
	Goal		Chris Robertson	Attendance: 400

28 July 1981 Friendly	Blyth Spartans	1–3	Hearts	Croft Park
	Goal		Gary Liddell; Paul O'Brien; Gerry McCoy	Attendance: 500

1 August 1981 Friendly	Hearts	0–1	Sunderland	Tynecastle Park
			Goal	Attendance: 4,937

30 December 1981 Friendly	Aberdeen	2–1	Hearts	Pittodrie Stadium
	John Hewitt		Chris Robertson

=== League Cup ===
8 August 1981 League Cup Group Section 3	Airdrieonians	0–1	Hearts	Broomfield Park
			Chris Robertson	Attendance: 3,158

12 August 1981 League Cup Group Section 3	Hearts	1–0	Aberdeen	Tynecastle Stadium
	Chris Robertson			Attendance: 10,461

15 August 1981 League Cup Group Section 3	Hearts	1–1	Kilmarnock	Tynecastle Stadium
	Gary Liddell		Wilson	Attendance: 7,746

19 August 1981 League Cup Group Section 3	Aberdeen	3–0	Hearts	Pittodrie Stadium
	Dougie Bell; John Hewitt; Gordon Strachan			Attendance: 9,131

22 August 1981 League Cup Group Section 3	Hearts	2–3	Airdrieonians	Tynecastle Stadium
	Gary Liddell; Gerry McCoy		Norman Anderson; Alexander Clark; Jim Kerr	Attendance: 4,881

26 August 1981 League Cup Group Section 3	Kilmarnock	2–0	Hearts	Rugby Park
	Clark; Stuart McLean			Attendance: 1,388

=== Scottish Cup ===
27 January 1982 Scottish Cup R3	East Stirlingshire	1–4	Hearts	Firs Park
	Billy Howitt		Roddie MacDonald; Chris Robertson; Peter Marinello; Pat Byrne	Attendance: 3,000

13 February 1982 Scottish Cup R4	Hearts	0–1	Forfar Athletic	Tynecastle Stadium
			Stephen Hancock	Attendance: 5,672

=== East of Scotland Shield ===
27 October 1981 Semi Final	Hibernian	1–2	Hearts	Easter Road
	Derek Rodier 73'		Roddie MacDonald 17'; Gordon Rae 82' (og.)

20 January 1982 Final	Hearts	5–0	Meadowbank Thistle	Tynecastle Stadium
	Willie Pettigrew 10'; Willie Pettigrew 48'; Willie Pettigrew 58'; Willie Pettigrew 82'; Pat Byrne 89' (pen.)

=== Scottish First Division ===
29 August 1981 Scottish First Division	Dunfermline Athletic	1–1	Hearts	East End Park
	Doug Considine		Gary Liddell	Attendance: 4,280

5 September 1981 Scottish First Division	Hearts	0–1	Kilmarnock	Tynecastle Stadium
			Alan Roberston 6'	Attendance: 4,796

12 September 1981 Scottish First Division	Falkirk	0–0	Hearts	Brockville Park
				Attendance: 3,650

16 September 1981 Scottish First Division	Hearts	2–1	Hamilton Academical	Tynecastle Stadium
	Gary Mackay 16'; Alex Hamill 60'		Brian Wright 73'	Attendance: 2,990

19 September 1981 Scottish First Division	Hearts	1–0	Clydebank	Tynecastle Stadium
	Derek O'Connor 84'			Attendance: 5,235

23 September 1981 Scottish First Division	Ayr United	0–0	Hearts	Somerset Park
				Attendance: 2,539

26 September 1981 Scottish First Division	Hearts	2–1	Dumbarton	Tynecastle Stadium
	Roddie MacDonald 30'; Derek O'Connor 46'		Raymond Blair 84'	Attendance: 3,604

3 October 1981 Scottish First Division	Queen's Park	1–0	Hearts	Hampden Park
	Jimmy Gilmour 78'			Attendance: 2,101

7 October 1981 Scottish First Division	Hearts	3–1	St Johnstone	Tynecastle Stadium
	Derek O'Connor 3'; Willie Pettigrew 77'; Derek O'Connor 81'		James Morton 50'	Attendance: 4,033

10 October 1981 Scottish First Division	Queen of the South	1–2	Hearts	Palmerston Park
	George McVitie (80)		Peter Shields 20'; Derek Addison 89'	Attendance: 2,317

17 October 1981 Scottish First Division	Hearts	2–1	Raith Rovers	Tynecastle Stadium
	Roddie MacDonald 25'; Gary Liddell 44'		Lloyd Irvine 53'	Attendance: 5,001

24 October 1981 Scottish First Division	Motherwell	2–2	Hearts	Firhill Stadium
	John McKeever 23'; John McKeever 77'		Willie Pettigrew 22'; Willie Pettigrew 83'	Attendance: 7,562

31 October 1981 Scottish First Division	Hearts	0–1	East Stirlingshire	Tynecastle Stadium
			Billy Howitt 56'	Attendance: 5,651

7 November 1981 Scottish First Division	Kilmarnock	0–0	Hearts	Rugby Park
				Attendance: 3,348

14 November 1981 Scottish First Division	Hearts	1–1	Dunfermline Athletic	Tynecastle Stadium
	Chris Robertson 39'		Alexander McNaughton 46' (pen.)	Attendance: 5,570

21 November 1981 Scottish First Division	Hamilton Academical	0–2	Hearts	Douglas Park
			Gary Mackay 41'; Derek Addison 55'	Attendance: 1,991

28 November 1981 Scottish First Division	Dumbarton	3–1	Hearts	Boghead Park
	Raymond Blair 24'; Pat McGowan 57'; Michael Dunlop 66'		Peter Marinello 82'

5 December 1981 Scottish First Division	Hearts	1–1	Queen's Park	Tynecastle Stadium
	Willie Pettigrew 84'		Gerard Crawley 89'	Attendance: 3,991

30 January 1982 Scottish First Division	Hearts	0–3	Motherwell	Tynecastle Stadium
			Willie Irvine 43'; Brian Coyne 65'; Ian Clinging 84'	Attendance: 11,054

6 February 1982 Scottish First Division	East Stirlingshire	0–1	Hearts	Firs Park
			Pat Byrne 9'	Attendance: 1,263

9 February 1982 Scottish First Division	Hearts	3–0	Falkirk	Tynecastle Stadium
	Gerry McCoy 34'; Peter Marinello 45'; Willie Pettigrew 59'			Attendance: 2,735

17 February 1982 Scottish First Division	Hearts	4–1	Queen of the South	Tynecastle Stadium
	Chris Robertson 1'; Roddie MacDonald 16'; Willie Pettigrew 47'; Gerry McCoy 49'		Rowan Alexander 2'	Attendance: 2,397

20 February 1982 Scottish First Division	Ayr United	0–3	Hearts	Somerset Park
			Gerry McCoy 8'; Willie Pettigrew 47'; Pat Byrne 90'	Attendance: 2,902

23 February 1982 Scottish First Division	St Johnstone	2–1	Hearts	Muirton Park
	Jim Docherty 82'; John Brogan 85'	London Hearts	Gerry McCoy 19'	Attendance: 3,743

27 February 1982 Scottish First Division	Hearts	4–0	Raith Rovers	Tynecastle Stadium
	Chris Robertson 41'; Gerry McCoy 42'; Gerry McCoy 82'; Dave Bowman 89'			Attendance: 3,999

6 March 1982 Scottish First Division	Falkirk	3–1	Hearts	Brockville Park
	William Herd 25'; Thomas Ward 65'; Thomas Ward 79'		Chris Robertson 28'	Attendance: 3,042

13 March 1982 Scottish First Division	Queen of the South	1–5	Hearts	Palmerston Park
	Nobby Clark 53'		Willie Pettigrew 10'; Derek Addison 61'; Willie Pettigrew 64'; Pat Byrne 86' (pen.); Willie Pettigrew 90'	Attendance: 1,995

20 March 1982 Scottish First Division	Hearts	1–0	Queen's Park	Tynecastle Stadium
	Pat Byrne 65'			Attendance: 3,777

27 March 1982 Scottish First Division	Clydebank	2–1	Hearts	Kilbowie Park
	Martin Hughes 53'; Adam Ronald 76'		Pat Byrne 61' (pen.)	Attendance: 1,823

31 March 1982 Scottish First Division	Raith Rovers	0–3	Hearts	Stark's Park
			Gerry McCoy 46' (pen.); Gerry McCoy 86'; Roddie MacDonald 82'	Attendance: 4,647

3 April 1982 Scottish First Division	Hearts	3–0	Raith Rovers	Tynecastle Stadium
	Roddie MacDonald 28'; Chris Robertson 35'; Chris Robertson 72'			Attendance: 4,577

10 April 1982 Scottish First Division	Hamilton Academical	0–2	Hearts	Douglas Park
			Alex MacDonald 65'; Willie Pettigrew 68'	Attendance: 2,432

14 April 1982 Scottish First Division	Clydebank	1–5	Hearts	Kilbowie Park
	James Given 30' (pen.)		Willie Pettigrew 2'; Willie Pettigrew 31'; Willie Pettigrew 39'; Willie Pettigrew 62'; Pat Byrne 67'	Attendance: 2,127

21 April 1982 Scottish First Division	Hearts	2–1	Ayr United	Tynecastle Stadium
	Alex Hamill 55'; Derek Addison 59'		John Shanks 50'	Attendance: 5,299

24 April 1982 Scottish First Division	Dunfermline Athletic	1–2	Hearts	East End Park
	Norrie McCathie 32'		Chris Robertson 63'; Roddie MacDonald 81'	Attendance: 4,564

27 April 1982 Scottish First Division	Hearts	2–0	East Stirlingshire	Tynecastle Stadium
	Pat Byrne 67' (pen.); Gerry McCoy 84'			Attendance: 4,603

1 May 1982 Scottish First Division	Hearts	2–5	Dumbarton	Tynecastle Stadium
	Pat Byrne 35'; Willie Pettigrew 42'		Raymond Blair 30'; Michael Dunlop 37'; Michael Dunlop 66'; Pat McGowan 82'; Michael Dunlop 85'	Attendance: 4,861

8 May 1982 Scottish First Division	Kilmarnock	0–0	Hearts	Rugby Park
				Attendance: 9,997

15 May 1982 Scottish First Division	Hearts	0–1	Motherwell	Tynecastle Stadium
			Willie Irvine 28'	Attendance: 14,374

== Scottish First Division table ==
Pos	Team	Pld	W	D	L	GF	GA	GD	Pts	Promotion or relegation
1	Motherwell (C, P)	39	26	9	4	92	36	+56	61	Promotion to the Premier Division
2	Kilmarnock (P)	39	17	17	5	60	29	+31	51	Promotion to the Premier Division
3	Heart of Midlothian	39	21	8	10	65	37	+28	50	
4	Clydebank	39	19	8	12	61	53	+8	46	
5	St Johnstone	39	17	8	14	69	60	+9	42	

Source: RSSSF
Rules for classification: 1) points; 2) goal difference; 3) number of goals scored.
(C) Champions; (P) Promoted

== Squad information ==
No.	Pos	Nat	Player	Total		Scottish First Division		Scottish Cup		Scottish League Cup	
No.	Pos	Nat	Player	Apps	Goals	Apps	Goals	Apps	Goals	Apps	Goals
	MF	(Ireland) EIR	Pat Byrne	43	9	37	8	2	1	4	0
	DF	(Scotland) SCO	Peter Shields	43	1	37	1	2	0	4	0
	DF	(Scotland) SCO	Stewart MacLaren	42	0	34	0	2	0	6	0
	MF	(Scotland) SCO	Roddie MacDonald	41	7	35	6	2	1	4	0
	GK	(Scotland) SCO	Henry Smith	41	0	33	0	2	0	6	0
	FW	(Scotland) SCO	Willie Pettigrew	37	16	35	16	2	0	0	0
	FW	(Scotland) SCO	Chris Robertson	37	9	29	7	2	1	6	1
	DF	(Scotland) SCO	Walter Kidd	35	0	30	0	2	0	3	0
	MF	(Scotland) SCO	Derek Addison	34	4	32	4	2	0	0	0
	MF	(Scotland) SCO	Alex Hamill	27	2	21	2	0	0	6	0
	FW	(Scotland) SCO	Gerry McCoy	25	10	21	9	1	0	3	1
	MF	(Scotland) SCO	Dave Bowman	23	1	16	1	2	0	5	0
	MF	(Scotland) SCO	Alex MacDonald	20	1	16	1	0	0	4	0
	MF	(Scotland) SCO	Gary Mackay	20	2	17	2	1	0	2	0
	MF	(Scotland) SCO	Peter Marinello	20	3	18	2	2	1	0	0
	DF	(England) ENG	Brian McNeill	19	0	17	0	0	0	2	0
	FW	(Scotland) SCO	Gary Liddell	16	4	11	2	0	0	5	2
	FW	(Scotland) SCO	Derek O'Connor	15	4	14	4	0	0	1	0
	DF	(Scotland) SCO	Colin More	9	0	3	0	0	0	6	0
	GK	(Scotland) SCO	John Brough	6	0	6	0	0	0	0	0
	DF	(Scotland) SCO	Stuart Gauld	2	0	2	0	0	0	0	0
	DF	(Scotland) SCO	Frank Liddell	2	0	0	0	0	0	2	0
	FW	(Scotland) SCO	Paul O'Brien	2	0	1	0	0	0	1	0
	FW	(Scotland) SCO	Derek Strickland	1	0	1	0	0	0	0	0
	FW	(Scotland) SCO	John Robertson	1	0	1	0	0	0	0	0

== See also ==
- List of Heart of Midlothian F.C. seasons
