= 1983–84 Heart of Midlothian F.C. season =

Heart of Midlothian
1983–84 season
- Chairman: Wallace Mercer
- Manager: Alex MacDonald
- Stadium: Tynecastle Stadium
- Scottish Premier Division: 5th
- Scottish Cup: Round 4
- League Cup: Group Section 2
- Top goalscorer: League: John Robertson (15); All: John Robertson (20)
- Average home league attendance: 11,914

The 1983–84 season was Heart of Midlothian F.C.'s first season of play back in the Scottish Premier Division, having gained promotion as runner-up of the 1982–83 Scottish First Division. Hearts also competed in the Scottish Cup and the League Cup.

== Fixtures ==
=== Friendlies ===
1 August 1983 Friendly	Nairn County	0–8	Hearts
			Dave Bowman; Gary Mackay; Alex MacDonald; Donald Park; Roddie MacDonald; Donald Park; Roddie MacDonald; Dave Bowman	Attendance: 300

3 August 1983 Friendly	Inverness	2–0	Hearts
	Lisle; Baxter			Attendance: 1,100

6 August 1983 Friendly	Elgin City	0–1	Hearts
			George Cowie	Attendance: 400

9 August 1983 Friendly	Hearts	0–0	Leeds United
				Attendance: 5,235

13 August 1983 Friendly	Hearts	2–3	Leicester City
	John Robertson 25'; John Robertson 44'		Robert Jones 4'; Gary Lineker 78'; Gary Lineker 85'	Attendance: 4,003

15 April 1984 Friendly	Hearts	3–2	Arsenal
	Walter Kidd 18'; Jimmy Bone 54'; Gary Mackay 62'		Paul Mariner 35'; Paul Mariner 70'	Attendance: 10,500

13 May 1984 Friendly	Buckie Thistle	2–3	Hearts
	Goal		Roddie MacDonald; Donald Park; Willie Johnston

=== League Cup ===
24 August 1983 League Cup R1	Cowdenbeath	0–0	Hearts	Central Park
				Attendance: 2,591

27 August 1983 League Cup R1 Replay	Hearts	1–1; 4 –2 on Penalties	Cowdenbeath	Tynecastle Stadium
	Gary Mackay		Brian Christie	Attendance: 4,147

31 August 1983 League Cup Section 2 Group	St Mirren	2–2	Hearts	Love Street
	Frank McAvennie 14'; Alan Logan 24'		Jimmy Bone 5'; John Robertson 44' (pen.)	Attendance: 4,226

7 September 1983 League Cup Section 2 Group	Hearts	0–3	Rangers	Tynecastle Stadium
			Gauld 40' (og.); Alexander Clark 60'; Alexander Clark 74'	Attendance: 11,287

5 October 1983 League Cup Section 2 Group	Hearts	1–1	Clydebank	Tynecastle Stadium
	Donald Park 37'		Bobby Williamson 57'	Attendance: 2,527

26 October 1983 League Cup Section 2 Group	Rangers	2–0	Hearts	Ibrox Stadium
	Robert Prytz 33'; David Mitchell 83'			Attendance: 9,820

9 November 1983 League Cup Section 2 Group	Hearts	3–1	St Mirren	Tynecastle Stadium
	Derek O'Connor 35'; Gary Mackay 44' (pen.); John Robertson 65'		McDougall 31'	Attendance: 2,002

30 November 1983 League Cup Section 2 Group	Clydebank	0– 3	Hearts	Kilbowie Park
			John Robertson 30'; John Robertson 59'; Willie Johnston 74'	Attendance: 1,039

=== Scottish Cup ===
6 February 1984 Scottish Cup R3	Hearts	2–0	Partick Thistle	Tynecastle Stadium
	George Cowie 51'; Jimmy Bone 66'			Attendance: 6,735

18 February 1984 Scottish Cup R4	Dundee United	2–1	Hearts	Tannadice Park
	Paul Sturrock 28'; David Dodds		John Robertson 70' (pen.)	Attendance: 14,371

=== Scottish Premier Division ===
20 August 1983 Scottish Premier Division	St Johnstone	0–1	Hearts	Muirton Park
			Jimmy Bone	Attendance: 6,586

3 September 1983 Scottish Premier Division	Hearts	3–2	Hibs	Tynecastle Stadium
	John Robertson 57'; John Robertson 70'; Jimmy Bone 77'		Ralph Callachan 11'; William Irvine 65'	Attendance: 19,206

10 September 1983 Scottish Premier Division	Hearts	3–1	Rangers	Tynecastle Stadium
	Alex MacDonald 9'; John Robertson 29'; Jimmy Bone 47'		David Mitchell 62'	Attendance: 15,986

17 September 1983 Scottish Premier Division	Dundee	1–2	Hearts	Dens Park
	Iain Ferguson 36' (pen.)		Jimmy Bone 70'; John Robertson 90'	Attendance: 6,761

24 September 1983 Scottish Premier Division	St Mirren	0–1	Hearts	Love Street
			Roddie MacDonald 8'	Attendance: 5,910

1 October 1983 Scottish Premier Division	Hearts	0–2	Aberdeen	Tynecastle Stadium
			Peter Weir 28'; Peter Weir	Attendance: 16,934

8 October 1983 Scottish Premier Division	Hearts	0–0	Motherwell	Tynecastle Stadium
				Attendance: 7,886

15 October 1983 Scottish Premier Division	Celtic	1–1	Hearts	Celtic Park
	Frank McGarvey 44'		Jimmy Bone 48'	Attendance: 20,207

22 October 1983 Scottish Premier Division	Dundee United	1–0	Hearts	Tannadice Park
	David Dodds 36'			Attendance: 13,157

29 October 1983 Scottish Premier Division	Hearts	2–0	St Johnstone	Tynecastle Stadium
	John Robertson 13', 27' (pen.)			Attendance: 8,207

5 November 1983 Scottish Premier Division	Hibs	1–1	Hearts	Easter Road
	Bobby Thomson 66'		John Robertson	Attendance: 21,281

13 November 1983 Scottish Premier Division	Hearts	1–3	Dundee	Tynecastle Stadium
	Gary Mackay 66' (pen.)		Tosh McKinlay 18'; McCall 57', 73'	Attendance: 12,271

19 November 1983 Scottish Premier Division	Aberdeen	2–0	Hearts	Pittodrie Stadium
	Doug Rougvie 33'; Neil Simpson 89'			Attendance: 19,805

26 November 1983 Scottish Premier Division	Hearts	2–2	St Mirren	Tynecastle Stadium
	Gary Mackay 21' (pen.), 67'		Frank McAvennie 12'; Frank McDougall	Attendance: 8,477

3 December 1983 Scottish Premier Division	Rangers	3–0	Hearts	Ibrox Stadium
	Sandy Clark 34', 70'; John MacDonald 78'			Attendance: 22,597

10 December 1983 Scottish Premier Division	Hearts	0–0	Dundee United	Tynecastle Stadium
				Attendance: 9,199

17 December 1983 Scottish Premier Division	Hearts	1–3	Celtic	Tynecastle Stadium
	John Robertson		Brian McClair 26', 81'; James Dobbin	Attendance: 14,865

26 December 1983 Scottish Premier Division	Motherwell	1–1	Hearts	Fir Park
	Johannes Edvaldsson		Jimmy Bone	Attendance: 7,620

31 December 1983 Scottish Premier Division	St Johnstone	1–2	Hearts	McDiarmid Park
	Ian Gibson 19'		Donald Park 31'; George Cowie	Attendance: 5,826

2 January 1984 Scottish Premier Division	Hearts	1–1	Hibs	Tynecastle Stadium
	Donald Park		William Irvine	Attendance: 23,499

7 January 1984 Scottish Premier Division	Dundee	4–1	Hearts	Dens Park
	Robert Glennie; McCall; Iain Ferguson; Fraser		John Robertson	Attendance: 5,960

11 February 1984 Scottish Premier Division	Hearts	2–2	Rangers	Tynecastle Stadium
	Derek O'Connor 88'; John Robertson 91'		Ally McCoist 31'; Bobby Williamson 47'	Attendance: 18,063

25 February 1984 Scottish Premier Division	Celtic	4–1	Hearts	Celtic Park
	Brian McClair 22', 37', 79'; John Colquhoun 75'		Donald Park 87'	Attendance: 17,950

3 March 1984 Scottish Premier Division	Hearts	2–1	Motherwell	Tynecastle Stadium
	John Robertson 36', 71'		John Gahagan 28'	Attendance: 6,898

11 March 1984 Scottish Premier Division	Dundee United	3–1	Hearts	Tannadice Park
	Eamonn Bannon 20'; Tommy Coyne 24', 82'		Walter Kidd 7'	Attendance: 10,058

17 March 1984 Scottish Premier Division	St Mirren	1–1	Hearts	Love Street
	Steve Clarke 65'		Willie Johnston 87'	Attendance: 4,215

24 March 1984 Scottish Premier Division	Hearts	2–1	St Mirren	Tynecastle Stadium
	John Robertson 18'; Jimmy Bone 45'		Rowan Alexander 66'	Attendance: 6,616

31 March 1984 Scottish Premier Division	Hearts	0–0	Dundee United	Tynecastle Stadium
				Attendance: 7,852

2 April 1984 Scottish Premier Division	Aberdeen	1–1	Hearts	Pittodrie Stadium
	Ian Porteous 46'		John Robertson 62'	Attendance: 16,337

7 April 1984 Scottish Premier Division	Rangers	0–0	Hearts	Ibrox Stadium
				Attendance: 17,376

21 April 1984 Scottish Premier Division	Hibs	0–0	Hearts	Easter Road
				Attendance: 17,437

28 April 1984 Scottish Premier Division	Hearts	2–2	St Johnstone	Tynecastle Stadium
	Roddie MacDonald; Donald Park 82'		John Brogan 54'; Raymond Blair 83'	Attendance: 6,799

2 May 1984 Scottish Premier Division	Hearts	0–1	Aberdeen	Tynecastle Stadium
			Stewart McKimmie 62'	Attendance: 13,058

5 May 1984 Scottish Premier Division	Hearts	1–1	Celtic	Tynecastle Stadium
	Willie Johnston		Tommy Burns 45'	Attendance: 12,071

9 May 1984 Scottish Premier Division	Hearts	1–1	Dundee	Tynecastle Stadium
	Gary Mackay 10'		Jim McInally 50'	Attendance: 6,572

12 May 1984 Scottish Premier Division	Motherwell	0–1	Hearts	Fir Park
			John Robertson 8' (pen.)	Attendance: 3,759

== Scottish Premier Division table ==
Pos	Team	Pld	W	D	L	GF	GA	GD	Pts	Qualification or relegation
3	Dundee United	36	18	11	7	67	39	+28	47	Qualification for the UEFA Cup first round
4	Rangers	36	15	12	9	53	41	+12	42	Qualification for the UEFA Cup first round
5	Heart of Midlothian	36	10	16	10	38	47	−9	36	Qualification for the UEFA Cup first round
6	St Mirren	36	9	14	13	55	59	−4	32	
7	Hibernian	36	12	7	17	45	55	−10	31	

Source: Statto
Rules for classification: 1) points; 2) goal difference; 3) number of goals scored.

== Squad information ==
No.	Pos	Nat	Player	Total		Scottish Premier Division		Scottish Cup		Scottish League Cup	
No.	Pos	Nat	Player	Apps	Goals	Apps	Goals	Apps	Goals	Apps	Goals
	GK	(Scotland) SCO	Henry Smith	44	0	36	0	2	0	6	0
	GK	(Scotland) SCO	Ian Westwater	2	0	0	0	0	0	2	0
	DF	(Scotland) SCO	Alan Redpath	2	0	0	0	0	0	2	0
	DF	(Scotland) SCO	Malcolm Murray	1	0	1	0	0	0	0	0
	DF	(Scotland) SCO	George Cowie	44	2	35	1	2	1	7	0
	DF	(Scotland) SCO	Stuart Gauld	5	0	3	0	0	0	2	0
	DF	(Scotland) SCO	Peter Shields	5	0	3	0	0	0	2	0
	DF	(Scotland) SCO	Walter Kidd	40	1	31	1	2	0	7	0
	DF	(Scotland) SCO	Stewart MacLaren	26	0	19	0	2	0	5	0
	DF	(Scotland) SCO	Craig Levein	21	0	19	0	2	0	0	0
	MF	(Scotland) SCO	Roddie MacDonald	41	2	34	2	0	0	7	0
	MF	(Scotland) SCO	Dave Bowman	41	0	33	0	1	0	7	0
	MF	(Scotland) SCO	Gary Mackay	41	6	31	4	2	0	8	2
	MF	(Scotland) SCO	Donald Park	38	5	30	4	1	0	7	1
	MF	(Scotland) SCO	Alex MacDonald	28	1	24	1	0	0	4	0
	MF	(Scotland) SCO	Willie Johnston	27	3	20	2	1	0	6	1
	MF	(Scotland) SCO	Gregor Stevens	5	0	3	0	2	0	0	0
	MF	(Scotland) SCO	Scott Colin	1	0	0	0	0	0	1	0
	MF	(Scotland) SCO	Sandy Jardine	45	0	36	0	2	0	7	0
	FW	(Scotland) SCO	John Robertson	43	20	34	15	2	1	7	4
	FW	(Scotland) SCO	Gerry McCoy	1	0	0	0	0	0	1	0
	FW	(Scotland) SCO	Willie Pettigrew	1	0	0	0	0	0	1	0
	FW	(Scotland) SCO	Jimmy Bone	41	9	34	7	2	1	5	1
	FW	(Scotland) SCO	Derek O'Connor	16	2	11	1	1	1	4	0

== See also ==
- List of Heart of Midlothian F.C. seasons
