= 1982–83 Heart of Midlothian F.C. season =

Heart of Midlothian
1982–83 season
- Chairman: Wallace Mercer
- Manager: Alex MacDonald
- Stadium: Tynecastle Stadium
- Scottish First Division: 2nd (Promoted)
- Scottish Cup: Quarter-final
- League Cup: Semi-final
- Top goalscorer: League: John Robertson (21); All: Derek O'Connor (22)
- Highest home attendance: 14,554 v St Johnstone Scottish First Division 1 January 1983
- Lowest home attendance: 3,471 v Forfar Athletic League Cup 18 August 1982
- Average home league attendance: 5,908

During the 1982–83 season, Heart of Midlothian F.C. competed in the Scottish First Division, the Scottish Cup and the Scottish League Cup.

== Fixtures ==
=== Friendlies ===
27 July 1982 Friendly	North Shields	1–1	Hearts
	Goal		Goal	Attendance: 600

29 July 1982 Friendly	Blyth Spartans	0–3	Hearts
			Willie Pettigrew; John Robertson; John Robertson	Attendance: 500

31 July 1982 Friendly	Whitley Bay F.C.	1–3	Hearts
	Goal		Pat Byrne; Gerry McCoy; Willie Pettigrew	Attendance: 510

4 August 1982 Friendly	Hearts	4–2	Sheffield United
	Gary Mackay 3'; Walter Kidd 47'; Dave Bowman 50'; Gary Mackay 52'		Terry Curran 26'; Keith Edwards 82'	Attendance: 3,600

7 August 1982 Friendly	Hearts	1–0	Leeds United
	Hart 30' (og.)			Attendance: 5,800

9 August 1982 Friendly	Hibs	1–0	Hearts
	John McNamara 90'			Attendance: 10,000

24 November 1982 Friendly	Hearts	0–2	Dynamo Kyiv
			Yevtushenko 6'; Bal 17'	Attendance: 4,600

18 April 1983 Friendly	Ross County	1–5	Hearts
	Goal		Gary Mackay; John Robertson; Pat Byrne; Gary Mackay; Pat Byrne	Attendance: 600

=== League Cup ===
14 August 1982 League Cup Section 5 Group	Motherwell	2–1	Hearts	Fir Park
	Brian Coyne; Alfie Conn		Derek O'Connor	Attendance: 5,105

18 August 1982 League Cup Section 5 Group	Hearts	2–1	Forfar Athletic	Tynecastle Stadium
	Derek O'Connor; Derek O'Connor		John Porter	Attendance: 3,471

21 August 1982 League Cup Section 5 Group	Clyde	1–7	Hearts	Shawfield Stadium
	Derek McCutcheon		Willie Pettigrew; Brogan og. (og.); Dave Bowman; Peter Shields; Willie Pettigrew; Willie Pettigrew; Willie Pettigrew	Attendance: 1,429

25 August 1982 League Cup Section 5 Group	Forfar Athletic	0–2	Hearts	Station Park
			Alex MacDonald; Peter Marinello	Attendance: 1,869

28 August 1982 League Cup Section 5 Group	Hearts	1–0	Motherwell	Tynecastle Stadium
	Alex MacDonald			Attendance: 9,029

1 September 1982 League Cup Section 5 Group	Hearts	3–0	Clyde	Tynecastle Stadium
	Peter Shields; Willie Pettigrew; Dave Bowman			Attendance: 4,443

8 September 1982 League Cup Quarter-Final 1st Leg	St Mirren	1–1	Hearts	Love Street
	Alan Logan		Willie Pettigrew	Attendance: 5,523

22 September 1982 League Cup Quarter-Final 2nd Leg	Hearts	2–1	St Mirren	Tynecastle Stadium
	Alex MacDonald; Willie Pettigrew		William Stark	Attendance: 11,919

27 October 1982 League Cup Semi-Final 1st Leg	Rangers	2–0	Hearts	Ibrox Stadium
	Davie Cooper; Jim Bett			Attendance: 22,548

10 November 1982 League Cup Semi-Final 2nd Leg	Hearts	1–2	Rangers	Tynecastle Stadium
	Derek O'Connor		Jim Bett (penalty); Derek Johnstone	Attendance: 18,993

=== Scottish Cup ===
29 January 1983 Scottish Cup R3	Queen of the South	1–1	Hearts	Palmerston Park
	Robertson		Peter Shields	Attendance: 6,034

2 February 1983 Scottish Cup R3 Replay	Hearts	1–0	Queen of the South	Tynecastle Stadium
	Derek O'Connor			Attendance: 6,472

20 February 1983 Scottish Cup R4	Hearts	2–1	East Fife	Tynecastle Stadium
	Roddie MacDonald; Derek O'Connor		Martin Caithness	Attendance: 9,336

12 March 1983 Scottish Cup Quarter-Final	Celtic	4–1	Hearts	Celtic Park
	Charlie Nicholas; Charlie Nicholas; Murdo MacLeod; Frank McGarvey		Alex MacDonald	Attendance: 14,371

=== Scottish First Division ===
4 September 1982 Scottish First Division	Queens Park	1–2	Hearts	Hampden Park
	Stephen Cook		Dave Bowman; Peter Marinello	Attendance: 1,817

11 September 1982 Scottish First Division	Hearts	1–1	Ayr United	Tynecastle Stadium
	Derek O'Connor		Larnach	Attendance: 5,601

15 September 1982 Scottish First Division	St Johnstone	1–1	Hearts	Muirton Park
	Derek Addison		Willie Pettigrew	Attendance: 4,353

18 September 1982 Scottish First Division	Falkirk	1–1	Hearts	Brockville Park
	Gary Thompson		Derek O'Connor	Attendance: 3,096

25 September 1982 Scottish First Division	Hearts	1–0	Clyde	Tynecastle Stadium
	Dave Bowman			Attendance: 4,734

29 September 1982 Scottish First Division	Hearts	4–1	Clydebank	Tynecastle Stadium
	Willie Pettigrew; Derek O'Connor; Pat Byrne; Sandy Jardine		Ronald	Attendance: 3,991

2 October 1982 Scottish First Division	Raith Rovers	1–0	Hearts	Stark's Park
	Colin Harris 63'			Attendance: 3,543

6 October 1982 Scottish First Division	Hearts	1–1	Dumbarton	Tynecastle Stadium
	Derek O'Connor		John Donnelly	Attendance: 4,300

9 October 1982 Scottish First Division	Hearts	3–0	Alloa Athletic	Tynecastle Stadium
	Roddie MacDonald; Holt og.' John Robertson			Attendance: 4,382

16 October 1982 Scottish First Division	Hamilton Academical	1–3	Hearts	Douglas Park
	Thomas Donnelly		Alex MacDonald; Pat Byrne; Derek O'Connor	Attendance: 2,204

23 October 1982 Scottish First Division	Hearts	4–1	Dunfermline Athletic	Tynecastle Stadium
	Derek O'Connor; Dave Bowman; Alex MacDonald; Willie Johnston		Hugh Hamill	Attendance: 5,997

30 October 1982 Scottish First Division	Partick Thistle	1–1	Hearts	Firhill Stadium
	Alexander O'Hara		John Robertson	Attendance: 3,212

6 November 1982 Scottish First Division	Hearts	2–4	Airdrieonians	Tynecastle Stadium
	Derek O'Connor; Sandy Jardine		Flood; Flood; Gary Faulds; Blair Millar	Attendance: 5,651

13 November 1982 Scottish First Division	Clydebank	0–3	Hearts	Kilbowie Park
			Gary Mackay; Derek O'Connor; John Robertson	Attendance: 2,121

20 November 1982 Scottish First Division	Hearts	3–1	Falkirk	Tynecastle Stadium
	Willie Johnston; John Robertson; John Robertson		Thomas Ward	Attendance: 4,847

27 November 1982 Scottish First Division	Dumbarton	1–1	Hearts	Boghead Park
	Raymond Blair		Derek O'Connor	Attendance: 1,297

4 December 1982 Scottish First Division	Hearts	2–0	Falkirk	Tynecastle Stadium
	Gary Mackay 13'; Willie Johnston 70' (pen.)			Attendance: 4,190

11 December 1982 Scottish First Division	Clyde	2–3	Hearts	Shawfield Stadium
	Robert Reilly; Robert Reilly		Alex MacDonald; Willie Pettigrew; Willie Pettigrew	Attendance: 1,492

27 December 1982 Scottish First Division	Ayr United	0–3	Hearts	Somerset Park
			Derek O'Connor; Willie Pettigrew; Alex MacDonald	Attendance: 3,448

1 January 1983 Scottish First Division	Hearts	1–0	St Johnstone	Tynecastle Stadium
	Willie Pettigrew			Attendance: 14,554

3 January 1982 Scottish First Division	Airdrieonians	0–1	Hearts	Broomfield Park
			Willie Pettigrew	Attendance: 4,566

8 January 1983 Scottish First Division	Hearts	2–1	Hamilton Academical	Tynecastle Stadium
	Willie Pettigrew; Derek O'Connor		Thomas Donnelly	Attendance: 5,081

15 January 1983 Scottish First Division	Alloa Athletic	0–0	Hearts	Recreation Park
				Attendance: 2,591

22 January 1983 Scottish First Division	Hearts	0–1	Partick Thistle	Tynecastle Stadium
			Donald Park	Attendance: 7,141

9 February 1983 Scottish First Division	Dunfermline Athletic	2–1	Hearts	East End Park
	Robert Forrest 50' (pen.); Jenkins 89'		Roddie MacDonald	Attendance: 2,928

12 February 1983 Scottish First Division	Hearts	5–1	Ayr United	Tynecastle Stadium
	Derek O'Connor; Willie Pettigrew; Gary Mackay; Dave Bowman; Pat Byrne		Alexander McNaughton	Attendance: 4,294

26 February 1983 Scottish First Division	Queen's Park	0–3	Hearts	Hampden Park
			John Robertson; John Robertson; John Robertson	Attendance: 1,682

5 March 1983 Scottish First Division	Hearts	1–2	Falkirk	Tynecastle Stadium
	Derek O'Connor		Robert McCulley; Mackin	Attendance: 4,304

19 March 1983 Scottish First Division	Hearts	4–0	Partick Thistle	Tynecastle Stadium
	John Robertson; Willie Pettigrew; John Robertson; John Robertson			Attendance: 7,495

26 March 1983 Scottish First Division	Hearts	3–1	Clyde	Tynecastle Stadium
	John Robertson; Gary Mackay; Roddie MacDonald		Tommy O'Neill	Attendance: 4,647

29 March 1983 Scottish First Division	Raith Rovers	4–2	Hearts	Stark's Park
	Colin Harris 33'; Jim Kerr 56' (pen.); James Marshall 68'; More 89'		Willie Johnston 6'; Willie Johnston 72' (pen.)	Attendance: 3,306

2 April 1983 Scottish First Division	Airdrieonians	0–2	Hearts	Broomfield Park
			Gary Mackay 44' (pen.); John Robertson 84'	Attendance: 2,799

6 April 1983 Scottish First Division	Hearts	2–0	Queens Park	Tynecastle Stadium
	John Robertson; Derek O'Connor			Attendance: 5,054

9 April 1983 Scottish First Division	St Johnstone	2–1	Hearts	Muirton Park
	Morton; Raymond Blair		Dave Bowman	Attendance: 7,501

16 April 1983 Scottish First Division	Hearts	2–2	Clydebank	Tynecastle Stadium
	John Robertson; John Robertson		Gerard McCabe; Gerard McCabe	Attendance: 6,432

23 April 1983 Scottish First Division	Alloa Athletic	1–1	Hearts	Recreation Park
	William Garner		Alex MacDonald	Attendance: 2,495

30 April 1983 Scottish First Division	Hearts	3–3	Dunfermline Athletic	Tynecastle Stadium
	John Robertson; John Robertson; John Robertson		Norman McCathie; Stephen Morrison; Stewart	Attendance: 6,427

7 May 1983 Scottish First Division	Dumbarton	0–4	Hearts	Boghead Park
			John Robertson; Derek O'Connor; Gary Mackay; John Robertson	Attendance: 2,149

14 May 1983 Scottish First Division	Hearts	2–0	Dunfermline Athletic	Tynecastle Stadium
	Willie Johnston; Derek O'Connor			Attendance: 9,136

== Scottish First Division table ==
Pos	Team	Pld	W	D	L	GF	GA	GD	Pts	Promotion or relegation
1	St Johnstone (C, P)	39	25	5	9	59	37	+22	55	Promotion to the Premier Division
2	Heart of Midlothian (P)	39	22	10	7	79	38	+41	54	Promotion to the Premier Division
3	Clydebank	39	20	10	9	72	49	+23	50	
4	Partick Thistle	39	20	9	10	66	45	+21	49	
5	Airdrieonians	39	16	7	16	62	46	+16	39	

Source: RSSSF
Rules for classification: 1) points; 2) goal difference; 3) number of goals scored.
(C) Champions; (P) Promoted

== Squad information ==
No.	Pos	Nat	Player	Total		Scottish First Division		Scottish Cup		Scottish League Cup	
No.	Pos	Nat	Player	Apps	Goals	Apps	Goals	Apps	Goals	Apps	Goals
	GK	(Scotland) SCO	Henry Smith	53	0	39	0	4	0	10	0
	DF	(Scotland) SCO	Stewart MacLaren	20	0	13	0	1	0	6	0
	DF	(Scotland) SCO	Stuart Gauld	15	0	14	0	1	0	0	0
	DF	(Scotland) SCO	Walter Kidd	50	0	37	0	3	0	10	0
	DF	(Scotland) SCO	Peter Shields	39	3	25	0	4	1	10	2
	MF	(Scotland) SCO	Roddie MacDonald	53	4	39	3	4	1	10	0
	MF	(Scotland) SCO	Sandy Jardine	53	2	39	2	4	0	10	0
	MF	(Scotland) SCO	Dave Bowman	52	7	39	5	4	0	9	2
	MF	(Scotland) SCO	Alex MacDonald	43	9	31	5	3	1	9	3
	MF	(Ireland) EIR	Pat Byrne	41	3	28	3	3	0	10	0
	MF	(Scotland) SCO	Gary Mackay	41	6	34	6	4	0	3	0
	MF	(Scotland) SCO	Willie Johnston	33	6	27	6	3	0	3	0
	FW	(Scotland) SCO	John Robertson	28	21	23	21	3	0	2	0
	FW	(Scotland) SCO	Gerry McCoy	11	0	6	0	2	0	3	0
	FW	(Scotland) SCO	Willie Pettigrew	47	17	33	10	4	0	10	7
	FW	(Scotland) SCO	Derek O'Connor	52	22	39	16	3	2	10	4
	MF	(Scotland) SCO	Peter Marinello	7	2	3	1	0	0	4	1

== See also ==
- List of Heart of Midlothian F.C. seasons
