= 1985–86 Heart of Midlothian F.C. season =

Heart of Midlothian
1985–86 season
- Chairman: Wallace Mercer
- Manager: Alex MacDonald
- Stadium: Tynecastle Stadium
- Scottish Premier Division: 2nd
- Scottish Cup: Runner Up
- League Cup: Quarter-final
- East of Scotland Shield: Winner
- Top goalscorer: League: John Robertson (20); All: John Robertson (25)
- Average home league attendance: 16,198

The 1985–86 season was Heart of Midlothian F.C.'s 3rd consecutive season of play in the Scottish Premier Division. Hearts also competed in the Scottish Cup, Scottish League Cup and the East of Scotland Shield.

== Fixtures ==
=== Friendlies ===
25 July 1985 Friendly	FSV Saarwellingen	0–2	Hearts
			Andy Watson; Brian McNaughton	Attendance: 600

26 July 1986 Friendly	SV Wiesbaden	0–0	Hearts
				Attendance: 500

29 July 1985 Friendly	spVgg Ingelheim 1923	1–5	Hearts
	Goal		Andy Watson; John Robertson; Brian McNaughton; Kenny Black; Roddie MacDonald	Attendance: 375

3 August 1985 Friendly	Eintracht Bad Kreuznach	1–4	Hearts
	Goal		John Robertson; Walter Kidd; Gary Mackay	Attendance: 400

4 August 1985 Friendly	SC Birkenfeld	1–2	Hearts
	Goal		Gary Mackay	Attendance: 750

23 October 1985 Friendly	Arbroath	1–4	Hearts
	Paul Kirkcaldy 36'		Sandy Clark 23'; Gary Mackay 25' 77'; John Robertson 80'	Attendance: 300

19 May 1985 Friendly	Barbados	1–3	Hearts
	Goal		Sandy Clark 20' 25' 55'

21 May 1985 Friendly	Trinidad and Tobago	0–3	Hearts
			Walter Kidd 15' 81'; Andy Watson 20'

23 May 1987 Friendly	Tintoc	0–2	Hearts
			Andy Watson 10'; John Robertson 70'

=== League Cup ===
20 August 1985 League Cup R2	Montrose	1–3	Hearts
	William Sheran 39'		Walter Kidd 24'; John Robertson 47'; John Colquhoun 88'	Attendance: 1,952

27 August 1985 League Cup R3	Hearts	2–1	Stirling Albion	Tynecastle Stadium
	Brian McNaughton 74'; Paul Cherry 101'		Scott Maxwell 39'	Attendance: 4,478

4 September 1985 League Cup QF	Aberdeen	1–0	Hearts	Pittodrie Stadium
	Eric Black 23'			Attendance: 13,066

=== Scottish Cup ===
25 January 1986 Scottish Cup R3	Hearts	3–2	Rangers	Tynecastle Stadium
	Colin McAdam 49'; Gary Mackay 55'; John Robertson 85'		Alistair McCoist 45'; Iain Durrant 69'	Attendance: 27,442

3 March 1986 Scottish Cup R4	Hamilton Academical	1–2	Hearts	Douglas Park
	John Brogan 1'		John Robertson 3'; Gary Mackay 68'	Attendance: 10,000

9 March 1986 Scottish Cup QF	Hearts	4–1	St Mirren	Tynecastle Stadium
	John Colquhoun 9'; John Robertson 43' 51' (pen.); Kenny Black 47'		Frank McGarvey 61'	Attendance: 20,655

5 April 1986 Scottish Cup SF	Dundee United	0–1	Hearts	Hampden Park
			John Colquhoun 14'	Attendance: 30,797

10 May 1986 Scottish Cup Final	Aberdeen	3– 0	Hearts	Hampden Park
	John Hewitt 5' 48'; William Stark 74'			Attendance: 62,841; Referee: H Alexander

=== East of Scotland Shield ===
6 May 1986 East of Scotland Shield	Hibs	1–2	Hearts	Easter Road
	Paul Kane 89'		Billy MacKay 9' (pen.) 80'	Attendance: 700

=== Scottish Premier Division ===
10 August 1985 Scottish Premier Division	Hearts	1–1	Celtic	Tynecastle Stadium
	John Colquhoun 28'		Paul McStay 91'	Attendance: 21,786

17 August 1985 Scottish Premier Division	St Mirren	6–2	Hearts	Love Street
	Gardner Speirs 17'; Peter Godfrey 36'; Frank McGarvey 43'; Tony Fitzpatrick 52'; Steve Clarke; James Rooney 72'		John Colquhoun 14'; John Robertson 83'	Attendance: 6,685

24 August 1985 Scottish Premier Division	Rangers	3–1	Hearts	Ibrox Stadium
	Hugh Burns 64'; Bobby Williamson 69' 88'		John Robertson 43'	Attendance: 35,746

31 August 1985 Scottish Premier Division	Hearts	2–1	Hibs	Tynecastle Stadium
	John Colquhoun 8'; Sandy Clark 81'		Gordon Durie 35'	Attendance: 17,457

7 September 1985 Scottish Premier Division	Aberdeen	3–0	Hearts	Pittodrie Stadium
	Billy Stark 32'; Paul Wright 74'; Eric Black 90'			Attendance: 12,226

14 September 1985 Scottish Premier Division	Hearts	2–0	Dundee United	Tynecastle Stadium
	Roddie MacDonald 1'; John Robertson 79'			Attendance: 7,617

21 September 1985 Scottish Premier Division	Motherwell	2–1	Hearts	Fir Park
	Andy Harrow 48'; John Gahagan 56'		Iain Jardine 46'	Attendance: 4,806

28 September 1985 Scottish Premier Division	Clydebank	1–0	Hearts	Kilbowie Park
	David Alexander Lloyd 88'			Attendance: 3,583

5 October 1985 Scottish Premier Division	Hearts	1–1	Dundee	Tynecastle Stadium
	Iain Jardine 57'		Derek McWilliams 11'	Attendance: 8,512

12 October 1985 Scottish Premier Division	Celtic	0–1	Hearts	Celtic Park
			John Robertson 32'	Attendance: 26,683

19 October 1985 Scottish Premier Division	Hearts	3–0	St Mirren	Tynecastle Stadium
	John Robertson 47' 53'; Gary Mackay 87'			Attendance: 8,618

30 October 1985 Scottish Premier Division	Hearts	1–0	Aberdeen	Tynecastle Stadium
	Craig Levein 15'			Attendance: 12,866; Referee: Louis Thow

2 November 1985 Scottish Premier Division	Dundee United	1–1	Hearts	Tannadice
	Richard Gough 91'		Iain Jardine 67'	Attendance: 10,142

9 November 1985 Scottish Premier Division	Hibs	0–0	Hearts	Easter Road
				Attendance: 19,776

16 November 1985 Scottish Premier Division	Hearts	3–0	Rangers	Tynecastle Stadium
	Sandy Clark 58' 79'; John Robertson 89'			Attendance: 23,083

23 November 1985 Scottish Premier Division	Hearts	3–0	Motherwell	Tynecastle Stadium
	Sandy Clark 33' 56'; Iain Jardine 63'			Attendance: 10,119

30 November 1985 Scottish Premier Division	Hearts	4–1	Clydebank	Tynecastle Stadium
	Neil Berry 5'; Sandy Clark 40'; John Robertson 45'; Kenny Black 80' (pen.)		Martin Hughes 89'	Attendance: 10,267

7 December 1985 Scottish Premier Division	Dundee	1–1	Hearts	Dens Park
	John Brown 7'		Iain Jardine 80'	Attendance: 10,780

14 December 1985 Scottish Premier Division	Hearts	1–1	Celtic	Tynecastle Stadium
	John Robertson 9'		Mark McGhee 66'	Attendance: 22,163

21 December 1985 Scottish Premier Division	St Mirren	0–1	Hearts	Love Street
			Kenny Black 25' (pen.)	Attendance: 6,498

28 December 1985 Scottish Premier Division	Rangers	0–2	Hearts	Ibrox Stadium
			John Colquhoun 15' 25'	Attendance: 33,588

1 January 1986 Scottish Premier Division	Hearts	3–1	Hibs	Tynecastle Stadium
	Iain Jardine 25'; John Robertson 71'; Sandy Clark 74'		Colin Harris 72'	Attendance: 25,605

4 January 1986 Scottish Premier Division	Motherwell	1–3	Hearts	Fir Park
	John Reilly 37'		Iain Jardine 54'; Neil Berry 57'; John Robertson 85'	Attendance: 10,131

11 January 1986 Scottish Premier Division	Hearts	1–1	Dundee United	Tynecastle Stadium
	Gary Mackay 69'		Eamonn Bannon 76'	Attendance: 19,043

18 January 1986 Scottish Premier Division	Aberdeen	0–1	Hearts	Pittodrie Stadium
			John Colquhoun 83'	Attendance: 20,216

1 February 1986 Scottish Premier Division	Clydebank	1–1	Hearts	Kilbowie Park
	Shanks 51'		Sandy Clark 86'	Attendance: 5,837

8 February 1986 Scottish Premier Division	Hearts	3–1	Dundee	Tynecastle Stadium
	John Colquhoun 21'; John Robertson 60'; Gary Mackay 68'		Vince Mennie 9'	Attendance: 15,065

22 February 1986 Scottish Premier Division	Celtic	1–1	Hearts	Celtic Park
	Maurice Johnston 30'		John Robertson 44'	Attendance: 42,346

15 March 1986 Scottish Premier Division	Hearts	2–0	Motherwell	Tynecastle Stadium
	Roddie MacDonald 31'; John Robertson 37' (pen.)			Attendance: 12,071

22 March 1986 Scottish Premier Division	Hibs	1–2	Hearts	Easter Road
	Steven Cowan 64'		Sandy Clark 38'; John Robertson 66' (pen.)	Attendance: 20,756

25 March 1986 Scottish Premier Division	Hearts	3–0	St Mirren	Tynecastle Stadium
	Craig Levein 42'; John Robertson 70'; Sandy Clark 87'			Attendance: 13,287

29 March 1986 Scottish Premier Division	Hearts	3–1	Rangers	Tynecastle Stadium
	John Robertson 8' 46' (pen.); Sandy Clark 89'		Alistair McCoist 66' (pen.)	Attendance: 24,740

12 April 1986 Scottish Premier Division	Dundee United	0–3	Hearts	Tannadice
			John Robertson 23' 66'; Sandy Clark 58'	Attendance: 19,878

20 April 1986 Scottish Premier Division	Hearts	1–1	Aberdeen	Tynecastle Stadium
	John Colquhoun 87'		Peter Weir 72' (pen.)	Attendance: 19,047

26 April 1986 Scottish Premier Division	Hearts	1–0	Clydebank	Tynecastle Stadium
	Gary Mackay 34'			Attendance: 20,198

3 May 1986 Scottish Premier Division	Dundee	2–0	Hearts	Dens Park
	Albert Kidd 83', 89'			Attendance: 19,567

== Scottish Premier Division table ==
Pos	Team	Pld	W	D	L	GF	GA	GD	Pts	Qualification
1	Celtic (C)	36	20	10	6	67	38	+29	50	Qualification for the European Cup first round
2	Heart of Midlothian	36	20	10	6	59	33	+26	50	Qualification for the UEFA Cup first round
3	Dundee United	36	18	11	7	59	31	+28	47	Qualification for the UEFA Cup first round
4	Aberdeen	36	16	12	8	62	31	+31	44	Qualification for the Cup Winners' Cup first round
5	Rangers	36	13	9	14	53	45	+8	35	Qualification for the UEFA Cup first round

Source: Rsssf
Rules for classification: 1) points; 2) goal difference; 3) number of goals scored.
(C) Champions

== Squad information ==
No.	Pos	Nat	Player	Total		Scottish Premier Division		Scottish Cup		Scottish League Cup	
No.	Pos	Nat	Player	Apps	Goals	Apps	Goals	Apps	Goals	Apps	Goals
	GK	(Scotland) SCO	Henry Smith	44	0	36	0	5	0	3	0
	DF	(Scotland) SCO	Craig Levein	41	2	33	2	5	0	3	0
	DF	(Scotland) SCO	Jimmy Sandison	5	0	3	0	0	0	2	0
	DF	(Scotland) SCO	George Cowie	9	0	8	0	0	0	1	0
	DF	(Scotland) SCO	Walter Kidd	35	0	28	0	5	0	2	0
	DF	(Scotland) SCO	Brian Whittaker	32	0	25	0	4	0	3	0
	MF	(Scotland) SCO	Sandy Clark	40	12	33	12	5	0	2	0
	MF	(Scotland) SCO	Gary Mackay	39	6	32	4	5	2	2	0
	MF	(Scotland) SCO	Neil Berry	37	2	32	2	5	0	0	0
	MF	(Scotland) SCO	Kenny Black	36	3	29	2	5	1	2	0
	MF	(Scotland) SCO	Iain Jardine`	25	7	23	7	2	0	0	0
	MF	(Scotland) SCO	Andy Watson	16	0	12	0	1	0	3	0
	MF	(Scotland) SCO	Roddie MacDonald	14	2	10	2	1	0	3	0
	MF	(England) ENG	Paul Cherry	7	0	5	0	0	0	2	0
	MF	(Scotland) SCO	Billy MacKay	4	0	3	0	1	0	0	0
	MF	(Scotland) SCO	Sandy Jardine	43	0	35	0	5	0	3	0
	MF	(Scotland) SCO	Alex MacDonald	1	0	1	0	0	0	0	0
	FW	(Scotland) SCO	John Robertson	43	25	35	20	5	4	3	1
	FW	(Scotland) SCO	John Colquhoun	44	11	36	8	5	2	3	1
	FW	(Scotland) SCO	Colin McAdam	6	0	5	0	1	0	0	0
	FW	(Scotland) SCO	Brian McNaughton	5	0	4	0	0	0	1	0

== See also ==
- List of Heart of Midlothian F.C. seasons
