= East Kilbride Thistle F.C. =

Association football club in Scotland

East Kilbride Thistle
- Full name: East Kilbride Thistle Football Club
- Nickname: The Jags
- Founded: 1968
- Ground: Showpark, East Kilbride
- Capacity: 2,300
- Coordinates: 55°46′1″N 4°10′19″W
- Director: Peter Kelsall
- Manager: Mark Steele
- League: West of Scotland League Third Division
- 2025–26: West of Scotland League Fourth Division, 5th of 16 (promoted)
- Website: http://www.ekthistlefc.com/
Home colours	Away colours

East Kilbride Thistle Football Club are a Scottish football club, based in the town of East Kilbride, South Lanarkshire near Glasgow. Nicknamed The Jags, they were formed in 1968 and play at the Showpark, situated in the Village area of the town. Currently playing in the West of Scotland League Third Division. They wear all black; their change strips are all red, or white tops with red or black shorts.

== History ==
=== Original club ===
There was a club with the same name that existed in the 1920s. The team won the Second Division of the Scottish Junior League and the Lanarkshire Consolation Cup in 1922–23.

The original club disbanded so that Clyde could move to the town in to the early 1960s. After the move fell through, the junior team was reformed.

After Thistle disbanded, Strathclyde Juniors who were homeless applied to SJFA for permission to use ground for season 1965–66.

=== Modern club ===
The first trophy to be won was the West of Scotland Junior Cup in 1974. Cambuslang Rangers were beaten 3–1 in the final. The team reached the final again two years later, but lost to Arthurlie in a replay.

The biggest success was the Scottish Junior Cup win in May 1983, with victory over Bo'ness United at Ibrox Stadium. The final result was 2–0 to Thistle, with goals from skipper Joe Reilly and Kenny Gordon.

Thistle's previous manager was former St Johnstone and Hamilton Academical striker John Brogan, who took charge along with Martin Clark on a co-manager basis in November 1999. Clark left to coach Celtic's youth players in 2002, but Brogan remained in sole charge and won the Sectional League Cup at Partick Thistle's Firhill Stadium, Glasgow in 2002 with a 2–0 win over Bellshill Athletic, thanks to goals from Martin McVey and Stephen Brogan.

Brogan later returned the club to Firhill for another Sectional League Cup Final in 2005 but were unfortunate to lose to Neilston 4–3 on penalties, after a 0–0 draw. However it wasn't all bad news when the club won promotion to Super League Division One, from Central District League Division One, with a 3–0 win over Clydebank in the last game of the season on 1 May 2006.

John Brogan left the club in June 2008, and was replaced by former players Colin Mitchell and Ian Penman, as manager and assistant manager respectively. In 2008 Thistle also launched their own youth development structure, which sees coaching an teams from under 4s up to under 21s for both boys and girls.

In November 2010, Mitchell and Penman were replaced as team management by Jimmy Kerr and Tony Gallagher. In 2012 following relegation back to the Central District First Division, most of the playing staff, along with the management team left the club. After a season of turmoil on and off the pitch which resulted in relegation to the Central District Second Division, Thistle regrouped and started looking forwards to the future, the appointment of Alan Wardlaw as manager in late 2013 led to a change in fortunes for the club and they managed to win a few games, including a home league win for the first time in over 2 years. The team are managed from the end of the 2014–15 season by Billy Campbell.

Aaron Connolly was appointed caretaker manager following the departure of Garry O'Hanlon.

== Players & Current Squad ==
On 16 April 1972, Christie and Meechan played for Scotland Juniors against England in a 2–2 draw at Saracen Park (home of Ashfield), whilst playing for East Kilbride

Willie Pettigrew was another player capped at Junior level with Scotland. He would go on to gain full international honours with Scotland later in his career.

Current Squad Season 2024-25

Matt Borland Liam Comaskey Adam Edgar Alex McKenzie Ryan Anderson Matthew Mullen Declan Morrison Tyler Flynn Connor Dunlop Ally McDonald Mark Steele Aedan Dunnett Ryan Menzies Dino Molinari Ryan Kealy Jude Rodger Lewis Gray Jordan McBride Jay Scott Ross Duncan Callum Jamieson

== Honours ==
- Scottish Junior Cup
  - Winners: 1982–83
  - Semi-finals: 1972–73
  - Quarter-finals: 1971–72, 1977–78, 1980-81

=== League ===
SJFA West Region (Note: The SJFA West Region was one of the three major reformed regional league systems after the merger of Ayrshire and Central Region Junior Leagues between 2002 and 2019.)

- Central District First Division
  - Runners-up: 2005–06
- Central District Second Division
  - Promotion: 2016–17

SJFA Central Region (Note: The Central district region was one of the six major reformed regional league systems after the merger of the Central and Lanarkshire Junior Leagues between 1968 and 2002.)

- Central League Division A
  - Winners: 1974–75, 1975–76, 1979–80, 1981–82
  - Runners-up: 1972–73, 1973–74, 1980–81
- Central League Division B (Note: Later known as Central League First Division.)
  - Winners: 1992–93
  - Runners-up: 1977–78
  - Promotion: 1971–72
- Central League Division C (Note: Later known as Central League Second Division.)
  - Runners-up: 1998–99, 2000–01
  - Promotion: 1969–70

=== Cup ===
- West of Scotland Cup
  - Winners: 1973–74
  - Runners-up: 1975–76
- Evening Times Trophy (Central League):
  - Winners: 1974–75, 1975–76, 1981–82
  - Runners-up: 1979–80
- Evening Times Cup Winners Cup
  - Winners: 1982–83
- Central Sectional League Cup
  - Winners: 1974–75, 1982–83, 2002–03
- Central Drybrough Cup
  - Runners-up: 1972–73
- Red Hackle Trophy
  - Winners: 1974–75
- Whitebread Trophy
  - Winners: 1974–75
- Erskine Hospital Cup
  - Runner-ups: 1971–72
- Langs Trophy
  - Runners-up: 1978–79

=== Other ===
- Tommy McGrane Cup
  - Winners: 2009, 2015, 2016, 2017
