= Lawrie Tierney =

Scottish footballer

Personal information
- Full name: Lawrence James William Tierney
- Date of birth: 4 April 1959
- Place of birth: Leith, Scotland
- Date of death: 6 December 2011 (aged 52)
- Place of death: Phoenix, United States
- Position: Midfielder

Youth career
- Salvesen's B.C.

Senior career*
Years	Team	Apps	(Gls)
1976–1980	Heart of Midlothian	49	(2)
1980	Hibernian	8	(0)
1980–1981	Wigan Athletic	7	(0)
1981–1983	Phoenix Inferno (indoor)	46	(4)
1983	Golden Bay Earthquakes (indoor)	16	(0)
1983	Tacoma Stars (indoor)	3	(0)
Total		129	(6)
- * Club domestic league appearances and goals

Lawrence James William "Lawrie" Tierney (4 April 1959 – 6 December 2011) was a Scottish footballer who played as a midfielder. Born in Leith, Tierney started his professional career at Heart of Midlothian in 1976, making 49 league appearances for the club before being released in February 1980. He then had brief spells at Hibernian and Wigan Athletic before moving to the United States, where he played in the Major Indoor Soccer League for Phoenix Inferno, Golden Bay Earthquakes and Tacoma Stars.
