= Tommy O'Neill =

Scottish footballer

Personal information
- Date of birth: 24 December 1955 (age 70)
- Place of birth: Bellshill, Scotland
- Position: Midfielder

Senior career*
Years	Team	Apps	(Gls)
1976–1977	Motherwell	12	(1)
1977–1984	Clyde	216	(45)
1984–1986	Hamilton Academical	57	(5)
1986–1987	Airdrieonians	22	(1)
1991–1992	Stirling Albion	5	(0)
Total		312	(52)
- * Club domestic league appearances and goals

Tommy O'Neill (born 24 December 1955 in Bellshill), is a Scottish former football midfielder.

O'Neill began his career with Motherwell, before moving to Clyde in 1977. He is best known for his time at Clyde, spending 7 years at the club, making 216 league appearances, and finding the back of the net on 45 occasions. He had spells with Hamilton Academical and Airdrieonians before dropping out of the senior game in 1987. He returned in 1991, making a handful of appearances as player-coach of Stirling Albion, before being promoted to assistant manager.

He works as a scout for Aberdeen FC after a successful spell with Celtic.
