= Jimmy Bone =

Scottish footballer (1949–2025)

Personal information
- Full name: James Bone
- Date of birth: 22 September 1949
- Place of birth: Bridge of Allan, Stirling, Scotland
- Date of death: 1 September 2025 (aged 75)
- Position: Striker

Youth career
- Fallin Boys Brigade
- Airth Castle Rovers

Senior career*
Years	Team	Apps	(Gls)
1968–1972	Partick Thistle	107	(50)
1972–1973	Norwich City	39	(9)
1973–1974	Sheffield United	31	(9)
1974–1975	Celtic	7	(1)
1975–1978	Arbroath	97	(41)
1978–1982	St Mirren	131	(27)
1979	→ Toronto Blizzard (loan)	25	(3)
1980	→ Toronto Blizzard (loan)	25	(4)
1982–1983	Hong Kong Rangers		
1983–1985	Heart of Midlothian	56	(11)
1985–1986	Arbroath	30	(2)

International career
1972–1973	Scotland under-23	3	(1)
1972	Scotland	2	(1)

Managerial career
- 1985–1986: Arbroath
- 1989–1991: Airdrie
- 1991–1992: Power Dynamos
- 1992–1996: St Mirren
- 1996–1997: East Fife
- 2001–2002: Stenhousemuir
- 2007: Partick Thistle (caretaker)
- * Club domestic league appearances and goals

James Bone (22 September 1949 – 1 September 2025) was a Scottish professional footballer who played as a striker. Following his playing retirement he moved into coaching, and managed a number of Scottish League clubs.

== Playing career ==
=== Early career ===
Despite attending rugby union-playing Stirling High School, Bone developed a keen interest in football, through representative games with his local boys brigade. He began his professional career with Partick Thistle, whom he joined from junior side Airth Castle Rovers in 1968 and spent four seasons with the Jags. During this time they suffered their first relegation from the First Division since season 1900-01, finishing bottom of the table in 1969–70. (Note: Partick had previously twice failed to gain re-election to the First Division having finished bottom, in the late 1890s and early 1900s, however this marked the first time they had suffered automatic relegation.) However, the next season Bone was an integral part of the side that won the Second Division title and instant promotion back to the top flight. He earned another, unexpected, medal in 1971–72 when Partick won the Scottish League Cup by beating the overwhelming favourites Celtic. Celtic were the reigning League champions and had been European Cup finalists only two years earlier but Bone's 37th-minute goal helped Partick to a 4–0 halftime lead, the Jags eventually winning 4–1.

=== Move to England ===
Bone moved south of the border in February 1972, joining Norwich City in a £30,000 deal. Noted for his very fast runs down the wing, he helped Norwich secure the second division championship at the end of the 1971–72 season and scored the club's first ever goal in Division One at the start of the following campaign. He joined Sheffield United for £30,000 in March 1973.

=== Return to Scotland ===
Bone made further moves to Celtic (£25,000) and Arbroath (£12,000) in 1974 and 1975 respectively. He stayed with the Red Lichties for three seasons but his consistent scoring was not enough to gain them promotion to the new Premier Division, following the league reconstruction of 1975–76.

In January 1978 Bone became one of Alex Ferguson's last signings as St Mirren manager, moving to the Paisley club for £25,000. He was appointed captain by Ferguson's successor, Jim Clunie, and helped the side to victory in the Anglo-Scottish Cup and qualification for the UEFA Cup in the 1979–80 season. He moved to Hong Kong Rangers in 1981 and returned to Scotland with Heart of Midlothian in August 1983.

Bone was one of several veterans in the "Hearts" team and as a result the side was caustically dubbed Dad's Army. (Note: Other veterans in the side were Sandy Jardine (aged 34), Alex MacDonald (35), Willie Johnston (36), Stewart MacLaren and Donald Park (both 30).) However, the recently promoted side performed above expectations, finishing fifth in the League and qualifying for European competition. Bone scored several important goals, including the winner as Hearts defeated derby rivals Hibernian at Tynecastle for the first time in ten years. The following year he notched the side's 6,000th League goal. He left to take up the role of player-manager at Arbroath in February 1985.

== Managerial career ==
Bone stayed with Arbroath for almost two years, before moving to another former club St Mirren in December 1986, as Alex Smith's assistant manager. The side won the Scottish Cup for the first time in 28 years that season, while maintaining a safe position in the Premier Division. He left the Paisley side in April 1988 following a public dispute with striker Frank McGarvey.

After a brief stint coaching with Dundee United, he returned to management with First Division Airdrie, where he won promotion to the Premier Division in 1991 before resigning. He then spent a year in charge of Zambian side Power Dynamos, where he won the African Cup Winners' Cup in 1991.

Bone then returned to St Mirren as manager, but in four seasons he was unable to gain promotion with the Saints and eventually resigned in 1996. He spent one season as East Fife's manager before becoming assistant to Jocky Scott at Dundee. Dundee won the First Division under them in 1998. They also secured their first Dundee derby win at Dens Park since 1989 in May 2000.

In 2000, he coached South African Premier Division side Wits University F.C. now called Bidvest Wits. Bone was appointed Stenhousemuir manager in September 2001, but again his tenure lasted only one season. He served as Alex Smith's assistant at Ross County between 2002 and 2004, before Dick Campbell made him his assistant at Partick Thistle in 2005. When Campbell was sacked in March 2007, Bone assumed the role of caretaker manager for the last two months of the season. He left Partick after their appointment of Ian McCall as manager on 25 May 2007. The following December he moved south of the border to assist fellow Scotsman Bobby Williamson at Chester City but left the position just two months later after a poor run of form.

== Death ==
Bone died on 2 September 2025, at the age of 75.

== Career statistics ==
#	Date	Venue	Opponent	Score	Result	Competition
1	18 October 1972	Parken Stadium, Copenhagen, Denmark	Denmark	1–4	Win	1974 FIFA WC qual.
Correct as of 7 October 2015

== Honours ==
=== Player ===
Norwich City

- Football League Second Division: 1971–72

Partick Thistle

- Scottish Second Division: 1970–71
- Scottish League Cup: 1971–72

St Mirren

- Anglo-Scottish Cup: 1979–80

Heart of Midlothian

- Tennents' Sixes: 1985

=== Manager ===
Airdrieonians

- Scottish First Division promotion: 1990–91

Power Dynamos

- Zambia Premier League: 1991
- African Cup Winners' Cup: 1991

St Mirren

- Scottish Cup: 1986–87 (as assistant)

Dundee

- Scottish First Division: 1997–98 (as assistant)

=== Individual ===
- St Mirren Goal of the Season: 1980–81
- Norwich City FC Hall of Fame: 2003 Inductee
- St Mirren FC Hall of Fame: 2017 Inductee
- Arbroath FC Hall of Fame: 2019 Inductee
