= Paul O'Brien (Scottish footballer) =

Scottish footballer

Personal information
- Full name: Paul Patrick O'Brien
- Date of birth: 3 December 1965 (age 60)
- Place of birth: Glasgow, Scotland
- Position: Forward

Youth career
- Hillwood

Senior career*
Years	Team	Apps	(Gls)
1986–1990	Queen's Park	145	(41)
1990–1991	Dunfermline Athletic	2	(0)
1992–1994	Brechin City	37	(2)
1997–1998	Queen's Park	30	(4)
- * Club domestic league appearances and goals

Paul Patrick O'Brien (born 3 December 1967) is a Scottish retired footballer who made over 170 appearances as a forward in the Scottish League for Queen's Park.

== Honours ==
Brechin City

- Scottish League Second Division second-place promotion: 1992–93
