= Alex Hamill (footballer, born 1961) =

Scottish footballer

Personal information
- Date of birth: 30 October 1961 (age 65)
- Place of birth: Coatbridge, Scotland
- Position: Left back

Youth career
- 1979–1980: Tottenham Hotspur

Senior career*
Years	Team	Apps	(Gls)
1980–1982	Heart of Midlothian	41	(3)
1982–1986	Hamilton Academical	148	(4)
1986–1994	Forfar Athletic	291	(4)
1994–1995	Cowdenbeath	15	(0)
1995–1996	East Fife	31	(2)
Total		526	(13)
- * Club domestic league appearances and goals

Alex Hamill (born 30 October 1961) is a Scottish footballer, who played for Heart of Midlothian, Hamilton Academical, Forfar Athletic, Cowdenbeath and East Fife.
