= Ian Gibson (footballer, born July 1956) =

Scottish footballer (born 1956)

Personal information
- Full name: Ian Gibson
- Date of birth: 24 July 1956 (age 70)
- Place of birth: Hamilton, Scotland
- Position: Midfielder

Youth career
- Coltness United

Senior career*
Years	Team	Apps	(Gls)
1974–1980	Partick Thistle	106	(10)
1980–1983	Dundee United	21	(1)
1982	→ Morton (loan)	7	(1)
1983	→ St Johnstone (loan)	7	(1)
1983–1987	St Johnstone	131	(9)
1987–1989	Raith Rovers	65	(7)
1989–1991	Arbroath	20	(0)
Total		357	(29)

Managerial career
- 1985–1987: St Johnstone
- 1990–1991: Arbroath
- * Club domestic league appearances and goals

Ian Gibson (born 24 July 1956) is a Scottish former footballer who played as a midfielder.

== Career ==
Gibson began his professional career with Partick Thistle and made over 100 league appearances for The Jags during his seven years at Firhill. A move to Dundee United during the 1980–81 season beckoned, although Gibson played little over twenty league matches during his eighteen months at Tannadice, spending time on loan with Morton and St Johnstone. Gibson returned to Muirton Park permanently in 1983 and became player/manager in July 1985, a position he held until April 1987. Following his departure from Perth, Gibson spent two years with Raith Rovers, before moving to Arbroath in 1989. Shortly afterwards, he took up his second player/manager position, before being sacked in 1991.
