= Colin More =

Scottish footballer

Personal information
- Full name: Colin More
- Date of birth: 13 November 1960 (age 65)
- Place of birth: Edinburgh, Scotland
- Height: 6 ft 1 in (1.85 m)
- Position: Defender

Youth career
- 1977–1978: St Bernards

Senior career*
Years	Team	Apps	(Gls)
1978–1982	Hearts	47	(0)
1982–	Raith Rovers		
Total		47	(0)
- * Club domestic league appearances and goals

Colin More is a Scottish former professional footballer who played as a defender for Hearts and Raith Rovers.
