= John Gahagan =

Scottish footballer

Personal information
- Full name: John Gahagan
- Date of birth: 24 August 1958 (age 68)
- Place of birth: Glasgow, Scotland
- Height: 1.75 m (5 ft 9 in)
- Position: Left winger

Senior career*
Years	Team	Apps	(Gls)
1977–1978	Clydebank	5	(0)
1978–1979	Shettleston		
1979–1990	Motherwell	291	(38)
1990–1994	Morton	75	(10)
Total		371	(48)
- * Club domestic league appearances and goals

John Gahagan (born 24 August 1958) is a Scottish former footballer, who played as a left winger. Gahagan spent most of his career with Motherwell, spending twelve seasons with the Fir Park club, either side of spells with Clydebank latterly Morton. During his time at Fir Park, Gahagan picked up two Scottish Football League First Division titles.

A fully qualified SFA coach, Gahagan worked as a football development officer in Clackmannanshire before becoming an after-dinner speaker, winning the MBN trophy after being voted 'Scottish Sporting Speaker of the Year' in 2001.

== Honours ==
=== Motherwell ===
- Scottish Football League First Division: 2

1981–82, 1984–85
