= Gary Liddell =

Scottish footballer (1954–2015)

Personal information
- Date of birth: 27 August 1954
- Place of birth: Stirling, Scotland
- Date of death: 29 April 2015 (aged 60)
- Place of death: Falkirk, Scotland
- Height: 5 ft 9 1/2 in (1.77 m)
- Position: Striker

Senior career*
Years	Team	Apps	(Gls)
1972–1976	Leeds United	3	(0)
1976–1980	Grimsby Town	105	(22)
1980–1981	Hearts	24	(6)
1981–1983	Doncaster Rovers	37	(4)
Total		169	(32)
- * Club domestic league appearances and goals

Gary Liddell (27 August 1954 – 29 April 2015) was a Scottish professional footballer who played as a striker. Active in both England and Scotland between 1972 and 1983, Liddell made over 150 career League appearances.

== Career ==
Born in Stirling, Liddell played for Leeds United, Grimsby Town, Hearts and Doncaster Rovers.

== Personal life ==
His son Andy was also a professional footballer.

== Honours ==
Grimsby Town

- Football League Third Division: 1979–80
