= Jim Kerr (footballer, born 1959) =

Scottish footballer

Personal information
- Full name: James Kerr
- Date of birth: 17 January 1959 (age 67)
- Place of birth: Hamilton, Scotland
- Position: Midfielder

Youth career
- Cathkin United
- Stonehouse Violet

Senior career*
Years	Team	Apps	(Gls)
1979–1981	Dundee United	2	(0)
1981–1982	Airdrieonians	8	(0)
1982–1984	Raith Rovers	71	(22)
1984–1986	Brechin City	66	(5)
1986–1987	Falkirk	43	(2)
1987–1988	Hamilton Academical	33	(0)
1988–1990	Partick Thistle	61	(3)
1990–1994	Stirling Albion	108	(2)
1994–1995	Albion Rovers	12	(1)
1995–1997	Arbroath	18	(0)
Total		422	(35)
- * Club domestic league appearances and goals

James Kerr (born 17 January 1959) is a Scottish former professional footballer who played as a midfielder.
