= Chris Robertson (footballer, born 1957) =

Scottish footballer

Personal information
- Full name: Chris Robertson
- Date of birth: 25 December 1957 (age 68)
- Place of birth: Edinburgh, Scotland
- Position: Striker

Senior career*
Years	Team	Apps	(Gls)
1976–1980	Rangers	16	(2)
1980–1982	Heart of Midlothian	43	(7)
1982	Meadowbank Thistle	8	(4)
1983	Cowdenbeath	8	(1)
1983	Raith Rovers	1	(0)
1983–1986	Meadowbank Thistle	80	(19)
1986–1987	Berwick Rangers	11	(1)

International career
1977	Scotland U21	1	(0)
- * Club domestic league appearances and goals

Chris Robertson (born 25 December 1957) is a Scottish former professional football player who is best known for his time with Hearts and Meadowbank Thistle

Born in Edinburgh, Robertson started his career a Salvesen's Boys Club and moved to Rangers in 1976. He stayed at the club for three years before moving on to Hearts for two seasons. Robertson was then to have the first of two spells at Meadowbank Thistle, which had stints with Cowdenbeath and Raith Rovers separating them. In 1983, he joined Thistle permanently and went on to make close to 100 appearances in a four-year stay. A brief spell with Berwick Rangers followed in 1987 before Robertson moved to the junior leagues with Bonnyrigg Rose Athletic.
