= John Brough (Scottish footballer) =

Scottish footballer

Personal information
- Date of birth: 31 March 1960 (age 66)
- Place of birth: Edinburgh, Scotland
- Position: Goalkeeper

Youth career
- Cavalry Park

Senior career*
Years	Team	Apps	(Gls)
1977–1982	Heart of Midlothian	78	(0)
1983–1989	Partick Thistle	131	(0)
- Dunbar United

International career
1980	Scotland U21	1	(0)
- * Club domestic league appearances and goals

John Brough (born 31 March 1960) is a Scottish former professional footballer, who played for Heart of Midlothian and Partick Thistle in the Scottish Football League.
