= Willie Pettigrew =

Scottish footballer

Personal information
- Full name: William Haddow Pettigrew
- Date of birth: 2 October 1953 (age 73)
- Place of birth: Motherwell, Scotland
- Position: Striker

Youth career
- 1970–1971: Hibernian
- 1971–1972: East Kilbride Thistle

Senior career*
Years	Team	Apps	(Gls)
1972–1979	Motherwell	166	(80)
1979–1981	Dundee United	58	(21)
1981–1984	Hearts	68	(26)
1984–1985	Morton	33	(10)
1985–1986	Hamilton Academical	3	(0)
Total		328	(137)

International career
1976–1977	Scotland	5	(2)
1978	Scottish League XI	2	(1)
- * Club domestic league appearances and goals

William Haddow Pettigrew (born 2 October 1953) is a Scottish former footballer, who played as a striker for Motherwell, Dundee United, Hearts, Morton and Hamilton Academical. Pettigrew also represented Scotland and the Scottish League XI.

== Club career ==
Pettigrew started his career with Hibernian, but left them for junior club East Kilbride Thistle after failing to make a first-team breakthrough.

He joined Motherwell in 1972, where he had his most prolific goalscoring spell, averaging better than a goal every two league games. He ended the 1975–76 season as the highest scorer in the Scottish Premier Division at the age of 22. He repeated the feat when two years later in 1977–78. In 2019 it was announced that Pettigrew was to be inducted into the Motherwell F.C. Hall of Fame.

In 1979, Dundee United purchased Pettigrew for £100,000. He went on to win the 1979 Scottish League Cup Final with United, scoring two goals in a 3–0 replay win against Aberdeen. He also played in the winning 1980 Final team, but this time the goals were scored by the two strikers who were the club's first choice pairing for the next few seasons, Paul Sturrock and Davie Dodds.

In 1981, Pettigrew moved to Heart of Midlothian for a £120,000 fee, going on to achieve promotion to the Premier Division at the end of the 1982-83 season. He joined Morton in 1984 for one season, then ended his playing career the following season after playing a small number of games for Hamilton Academical.

== International career ==
It was at Motherwell that he won five caps for Scotland, 4 in 1976 and 1 in 1977. Scotland won all five games, with Pettigrew scoring a goal in each of his first two appearances. He also played in two games for the Scottish Football League XI in 1978 that both ended in 1-1 draws, giving Pettigrew an unbeaten career as an internationalist of seven games. He scored the Scottish League goal in the second of those two games. Having debuted for Scotland aged 22, his last full cap was aged 23 and his international career at all levels was over aged 25.

== Honours ==
Dundee United

- Scottish League Cup: 1979–80, 1980–81

Heart of Midlothian

- SFL First Division promotion: 1982–83

Scotland

- British Home Championship: 1976–77, 1977–78
