= John Brogan (footballer, born 1954) =

Scottish footballer and manager

Personal information
- Full name: John Gerald Brogan
- Date of birth: 9 March 1954 (age 72)
- Place of birth: Hamilton, Scotland
- Position: Striker

Youth career
- Blantyre Celtic

Senior career*
Years	Team	Apps	(Gls)
1972–1977	Albion Rovers	124	(32)
1977–1984	St Johnstone	244	(114)
1984	Hibernian	5	(1)
1984	→ Ayr United (loan)	5	(0)
1984–1987	Hamilton Academical	95	(35)
1987–1993	Stirling Albion	76	(39)
Total		549	(221)

Managerial career
- 1988–1994: Stirling Albion
- 1995–1996: Arbroath
- 1996–1997: Armadale Thistle
- 1997–1999: Blantyre Victoria
- 1999–2008: East Kilbride Thistle
- 2008–2014: Yoker Athletic
- 2014: BSC Glasgow
- 2014–2017: Lanark United
- 2017–2018: Wishaw Juniors
- 2018: Albion Rovers
- * Club domestic league appearances and goals

John Gerald Brogan (born 9 March 1954) is a Scottish professional football player and manager. He played for several Scottish clubs in the 1970s and 1980s, scoring 273 goals in all competitions during his career. He remains St Johnstone's record goalscorer.

== Playing career ==
Brogan began his senior career at Albion Rovers in 1972, signing from Junior club Blantyre Celtic. He moved to St Johnstone in February 1977, scoring 6 goals in 15 games to help the Saints avoid relegation from the First Division. Brogan was the First Division's joint-top goalscorer in 1979–80 and in 1982–83, scored 36 goals in all competitions as St Johnstone won the title and promotion to the Premier Division.

After St Johnstone were relegated from the Premier Division at the end of 1983–84 season, Brogan remained in the division after signing for Hibernian. The move did not work out however, and after a spell on loan at Ayr United, he joined his hometown club Hamilton Academical in December 1984. Brogan enjoyed a successful spell at Accies under the management of John Lambie and was the club's top scorer in each of his three seasons. Hamilton were First Division champions in 1985–86 with Brogan winning the divisional player of the year award. He finished his career with a six-year spell at Stirling Albion.

== Coaching career ==
Brogan joined Stirling Albion in July 1987 and was appointed player-manager in January 1989. He guided the club to the Second Division Championship in 1991, a Scottish Cup quarter-final in 1990 and ensured that the team became the highest ranked part-time team in Scotland. He was sacked by the Beanos in 1994 with the club facing relegation, a situation only caused by re-organisation of the SFL.

Brogan had a spell in charge of Arbroath between 1995 and 1996. Following his spell at Gayfield, he moved into Junior football, forming a managerial partnership with former Clyde player Martin Clark. The pair took charge of East Region outfit Armadale Thistle in 1996 then moved to Blantyre Victoria a year later, winning promotion for the Vics in 1998.

Brogan and Clark took charge of East Kilbride Thistle in November 1999, with Brogan assuming full control when Clark left to join the Celtic youth set-up in 2002. With East Kilbride, he won the Sectional League Cup in 2002 and promotion from Central District First Division in 2006.

Brogan took over as the manager of Yoker Athletic in 2008, leading the club to two successive promotions. He left the club in March 2014.

Brogan join new Lowland League side BSC Glasgow as manager in May 2014. He resigned in September 2014 and was appointed manager of Lanark United later that month. He left Lanark in August 2017 to become manager of Wishaw Juniors. Brogan resigned from Wishaw in February 2018.

In May 2018, Brogan was appointed manager of Scottish League Two club Albion Rovers, where he had been a player in the mid-1970s. Brogan left Albion Rovers in October 2018 after a 2–0 defeat to Formartine United in the 2018–19 Scottish Cup, and with the team sitting in the bottom position of League Two.

== Honours ==
=== Manager ===
Stirling Albion

- Scottish Second Division : 1990–91
- Stirlingshire Cup : 1991–92

=== Managerial statistics ===
As of match played 20 October 2018

Team	Nat	From	To	Record							
Team	Nat	From	To	G	W	D	L	GF	GA	GD	Win %
Albion Rovers	(Scotland)	May 2018	October 2018	15	1	1	13	9	39	−30	6.67
Total				15	1	1	13	9	39	−30	6.67

== See also ==
- List of footballers in Scotland by number of league appearances (500+)
- List of footballers in Scotland by number of league goals (200+)
