= Stuart Gauld =

Scottish footballer

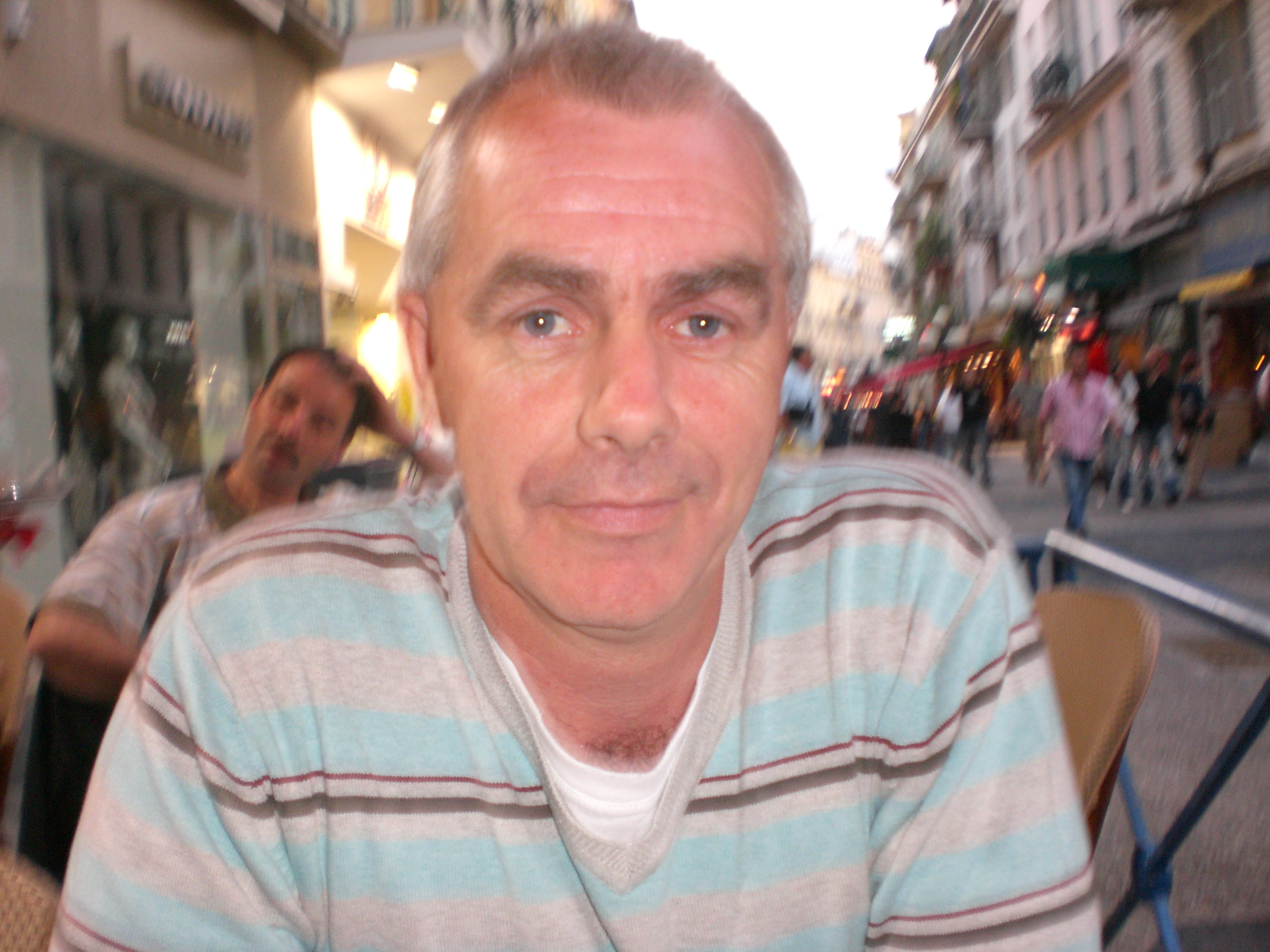
- Stuart Gauld in 2007

Personal information
- Full name: Stuart Thomas Gauld
- Date of birth: 26 March 1964 (age 62)
- Place of birth: Edinburgh, Scotland
- Position: Right back

Youth career
- –1981: Salvesen Boys Club

Senior career*
Years	Team	Apps	(Gls)
1981–1985	Heart of Midlothian	17	(0)
1985–1987	Derry City	23	(2)
1987	St Patrick's Athletic	3	(0)
1987–1995	Derry City	16	(0)
1995–1996	Glenavon	1	(0)
1996–1998	Finn Harps	53	(2)
1998–1999	Derry City	22	(0)
1999–2002	Omagh Town	?	(?)
- * Club domestic league appearances and goals as of 24 August 2013

Stuart Gauld (born 26 March 1964 in Edinburgh, Scotland) is a Scottish former footballer who played as both a full back and a center back.

Stuart signed for Derry City in November 1985, and was part of the team that took part in the club's first League of Ireland season in 1985/86. He made his League of Ireland debut at Monaghan for Derry on 1 December 1985. His first goal came on 15 December 1987 at Finn Park. His 100th competitive appearance came in a 1–0 loss to Shamrock Rovers on 2 April 1989.

He spent two seasons at the Ryan McBride Brandywell Stadium but was let go by Noel King in the Summer of 1987. He signed for St Patrick's Athletic in September 1987 and made his debut for the Saints in a 2–2 draw with Bohemians at Richmond Park on 20 September.

Stuart's time in Inchicore was brief and he moved back to Derry City on 16 October 1987. His second spell in Derry lasted eight years and he remained with the Candystripes until 1995 when he joined Irish League side Glenavon.

After less than a year with Glenavon, Stuart returned to the League of Ireland when he signed for Finn Harps in October 1986. Two seasons followed at Finn Park before a third spell at Derry City in 1998/99. He rounded off his career with three seasons at Omagh Town and retired from playing in 2002.

In a 1988/89 League of Ireland Cup quarter final game at Athlone Town Gauld replaced the injured Tim Dalton in a penalty shoot out and saved Stephen Yeates' penalty before scoring the winning penalty.

On the final day of the 1994–95 League of Ireland Premier Division Gauld had a penalty saved at the same venue that would have ensured the League title for Derry .

Gauld represented the League of Ireland at Inter-League level.

== Trivia ==
Gauld once appeared in the Guinness Book of Records for having the longest successful run of penalties taken in football.

== Honours ==
- League of Ireland Premier Division: 1
  - Derry City; 1988–89
- FAI Cup: 2
  - Derry City; 1989, 1995
- League of Ireland Cup: 4
  - Derry City; 1988–89, 1990–91, 1991–92, 1993–94
