= Pat Byrne (footballer) =

Irish footballer & manager (born 1956)

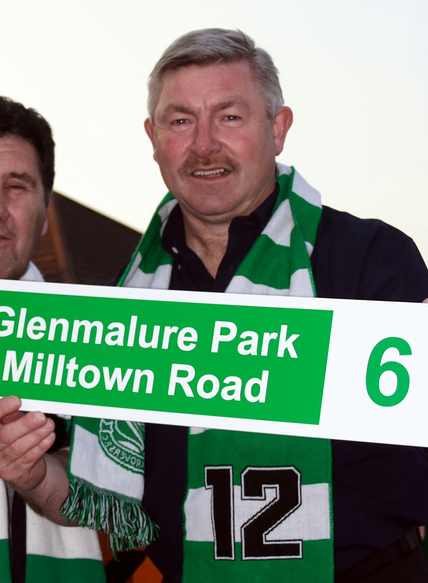

Personal information
- Full name: Patrick Joseph Byrne
- Date of birth: 15 May 1956 (age 70)
- Place of birth: Dublin, Ireland
- Position: Midfielder

Youth career
- –1974: Rangers

Senior career*
Years	Team	Apps	(Gls)
1974–1978	Bohemians	98	(20)
1978	Philadelphia Fury	19	(3)
1978–1979	Shelbourne	?	(0)
1979–1981	Leicester City	36	(3)
1981–1983	Heart of Midlothian	65	(11)
1983–1988	Shamrock Rovers	126	(16)
1988–1993	Shelbourne	?	(?)
1993–1994	Cobh Ramblers	4	(0)
1993–1994	St James's Gate	0	(0)
1993–1994	Shelbourne	1	(0)

International career
1974–1987	League of Ireland XI	?	(1)
1984–1986	Republic of Ireland	8	(0)

Managerial career
- 1988–1993: Shelbourne
- 1995–1996: St James's Gate
- 1996–1997: Shamrock Rovers
- 1999–2000: Kilikenny City
- * Club domestic league appearances and goals

Patrick Joseph Byrne (born 15 May 1956, in Dublin) is an Irish former football player and manager.

== Playing career ==
=== Club ===
A central midfielder, Byrne's playing career started with Bohemians, his debut coming against St Patrick's Athletic on 25 August 1974 in a LFA President's Cup Final. He made 162 appearances in all competitions for Bohemians (98 in the league, 10 in European competition) and won 2 League of Ireland titles and 1 FAI Cup before he moved to the US in 1978, for a year with the Philadelphia Fury of the North American Soccer League. At the Fury he played alongside fellow Irishmen Fran O'Brien and Eddie Byrne, appearing in eighteen matches plus one play-off game and scoring three goals. Byrne's teammates also included Alan Ball, Peter Osgood and Johnny Giles, while he played against the likes of Rodney Marsh, Carlos Alberto, Franz Beckenbauer, Giorgio Chinaglia and Bobby Moore.

He returned to Europe in 1979, playing for Leicester City in England until 1981, then Heart of Midlothian in Scotland until 1983. While playing for Hearts he was based in Dublin, and would regularly commute to Scotland for weekend fixtures. When this became too much of a burden, he was granted a free transfer and joined League of Ireland side Shamrock Rovers, where he won four league titles in a row and the FAI Cup three times between 1984 and 1987. He was the club's Player of the Year in 1984–85 and also picked up the SWAI Personality of the Year award for that season. He made seven appearances for Rovers in European competition.

=== International ===
In April 1983, Byrne played for the League of Ireland XI U21s against their Italian League counterparts who included Roberto Mancini and Gianluca Vialli in their team.The Irish Times. Dublin. 1 December 1983. ISSN 0791-5144 http://www.irishtimes.com/newspaper/archive/1983/1201/Pg003.html. During this time with Shamrock Rovers he also won eight full international caps for the Republic of Ireland, three inter-league caps, scoring once, and played in two 1988 Summer Olympics qualifiers.

== Management career ==
Byrne retired from playing at the end of the 1987–88 season when he was appointed as player-manager of Shelbourne. By 1992, he had guided the club to their first League of Ireland title in thirty years and the following year, he guided them to their first FAI Cup success in thirty years, when they beat Dundalk 1–0 in the final at Lansdowne Road. In the Cup Winners' Cup that autumn, Byrne brought Shelbourne their first European victory since 1964 when they knocked out Ukrainian club Karpaty Lviv 3–2 on aggregate. He was sacked along with his assistant Jim McLaughlin shortly afterwards, and was succeeded by Eoin Hand.

Byrne became player-manager of St James's Gate in February 1994 before he came back to Shamrock Rovers to manage the club for the 1996–97 season. He later took over at Kilkenny City and managed them to promotion to the Premier Division in the 1999–00 season.

In September 2006, he became an official Shamrock Rovers Legend.

== Honours ==
=== As a player ===
- League of Ireland: 6
  - Bohemians – 1974–75, 1977–78
  - Shamrock Rovers – 1983–84, 1984–85, 1985–86, 1986–87
- FAI Cup: 4
  - Bohemians 1976
  - Shamrock Rovers 1985, 1986, 1987
- League of Ireland Cup: 1
  - Bohemians 1975
- Leinster Senior Cup: 3
  - Bohemians 1974/75, 1975/76
  - Shamrock Rovers 1984/85
- LFA President's Cup: 2
  - Bohemians 1974/75
  - Shamrock Rovers 1984/85
- Football League Second Division
  - Leicester City F.C. 1979/80
- PFAI Player of the Year: 1
  - Shamrock Rovers – 1983/84
- SWAI Personality of the Year: 1
  - Shamrock Rovers – 1984/85
- SRFC Player of the Year: 1
  - Shamrock Rovers – 1984/85

=== As a manager ===
- League of Ireland: 1
  - Shelbourne 1992
- FAI Cup: 1
  - Shelbourne 1993
- SWAI Personality of the Year
  - Shelbourne – 1991/92
