= Peter Marinello =

Scottish footballer

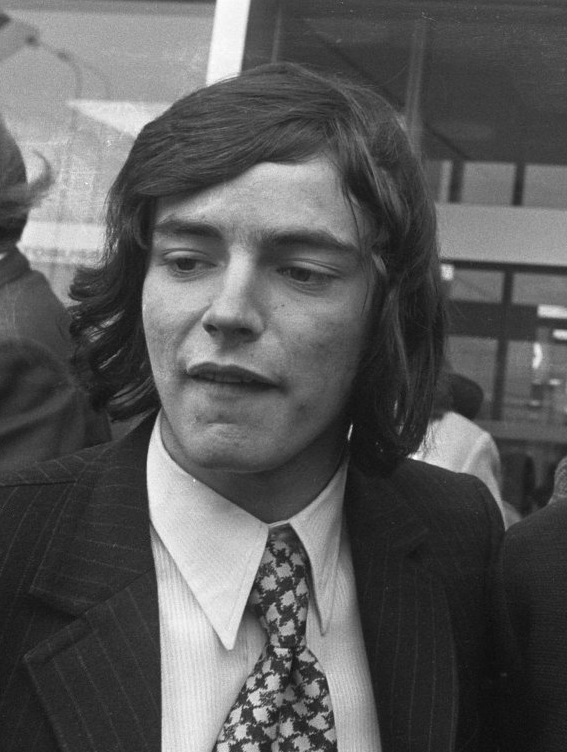
- Peter Marinello, April 1970

Personal information
- Full name: Peter Marinello
- Date of birth: 20 February 1950 (age 76)
- Place of birth: Edinburgh, Scotland
- Height: 1.75 m (5 ft 9 in)
- Position: Forward

Youth career
- Salvesen's Boys Club

Senior career*
Years	Team	Apps	(Gls)
1968–1970	Hibernian	45	(5)
1970–1973	Arsenal	38	(3)
1973–1975	Portsmouth	95	(7)
1975–1978	Motherwell	89	(12)
1978	→ Canberra City (loan)	11	(1)
1978–1980	Fulham	27	(1)
1980–1981	Phoenix Inferno	25	(17)
1981–1983	Heart of Midlothian	22	(3)
1983–1984	Partick Thistle	6	(0)
- Broxburn Athletic

International career
1969–1970	Scotland U23	2	(0)
1978	Scottish League XI	1	(0)
- * Club domestic league appearances and goals

Peter Marinello (born 20 February 1950) is a Scottish former footballer.

== Career ==
=== Hibernian ===
Marinello started his career at Hibernian, and could play either as a centre forward or right winger. He was regarded as being talented enough there that he was dubbed "the next George Best" by the British press.

=== Arsenal ===
In January 1970, a month before his 20th birthday, he joined Arsenal for £100,000, a club record fee at the time. The acquisition of Marinello also marked the first time that Arsenal had paid a six-figure sum for a player. He went on to score on his debut against Manchester United at Old Trafford on 10 January 1970. Next month, on 5 February, he appeared as a guest on the weekly pop show Top of the Pops, and on 21 February he reviewed the singles of the week in the music magazine Melody Maker (Instant Karma! by John Lennon was single of the week). However, a combination of a newly adopted 'celebrity party lifestyle' and a knee injury led to a dip in his footballing form and meant that he was not a regular in the team: he was not part of the squad for the final of Arsenal's Inter-Cities Fairs Cup triumph of 1970, but he contributed four appearances during the run, including the semi-final first leg against Ajax. He only played three matches in their 1970–71 Double-winning campaign. He subsequently played eight league matches in 1971–72 and thirteen in 1972–73. In total he played 51 matches for Arsenal, scoring 5 goals. Marinello left Arsenal in July 1973 after failing to agree a new contract.

=== Later playing career ===
He next played for Portsmouth followed by Motherwell, Canberra City, Fulham, Phoenix Inferno, Heart of Midlothian and Partick Thistle.

== After playing ==
Though he retired a wealthy man, a failed business venture left him bankrupt in 1994. He now runs an amateur football club and lives in Bournemouth, Dorset. He released an autobiography, Fallen Idle, in 2007.

== Honours ==
Hibernian

- Scottish League Cup: runner-up 1968–69
