= Gerry McCoy =

Scottish footballer

Personal information
- Full name: Gerard McCoy
- Date of birth: 24 December 1960 (age 65)
- Place of birth: Glasgow, Scotland
- Height: 5 ft 9 in (1.75 m)
- Position: Forward

Senior career*
Years	Team	Apps	(Gls)
1979–1981	Queen's Park	53	(20)
1981–1983	Heart of Midlothian	27	(9)
1983	→ Berwick Rangers (loan)	3	(0)
1983–1984	Partick Thistle	7	(0)
1984–1985	Falkirk	33	(22)
1985–1988	Dumbarton	101	(42)
1988–1990	Partick Thistle	42	(23)
1990–1991	Falkirk	20	(4)
1991–1992	Clyde	24	(6)
1992–1993	Albion Rovers	33	(11)
Total		343	(137)
- * Club domestic league appearances and goals

Gerry McCoy (born 24 December 1960) is a Scottish former footballer, who played as a forward.

== Career ==
He played for Queen's Park, Heart of Midlothian, Berwick Rangers, Partick Thistle, Falkirk, Dumbarton, Clyde and Albion Rovers.

== Partick Thistle ==
McCoy made his debut appearance on Saturday, 10 March 1984, in a 2-1 win at home to Meadowbank Thistle in the SFL First Division. McCoy scored his first goal for Thistle on Saturday, 30 July 1988, in a 2-0 friendly win away to Alloa Athletic.

He played his last game for the club on Saturday, 7 October 1989, in a 1-0 win at home to Falkirk in the SFL First Division, having appeared as a Jag on 60 occasions over two spells.
