= Donald Park =

Scottish footballer & coach (born 1953)

Personal information
- Date of birth: 19 July 1953 (age 73)
- Place of birth: Caol, Scotland
- Position: Midfielder

Youth career
- 1969–1972: Caledonian

Senior career*
Years	Team	Apps	(Gls)
1972–1978	Heart of Midlothian	142	(26)
1978–1983	Partick	162	(25)
1983–1985	Heart of Midlothian	52	(7)
1985–1986	Brechin City	37	(1)
1986–1988	Meadowbank Thistle	84	(11)
Total		477	(70)

Managerial career
- 1992–1993: Meadowbank Thistle
- 1994–1995: Arbroath (co-manager)
- 2001: Hibernian (caretaker)
- 2004: Inverness CT (caretaker)
- 2017–2018: Scotland under-19
- * Club domestic league appearances and goals

Donald Park (born 19 July 1953) is a Scottish football player and coach.

== Playing career ==
A product of the Scottish Highland Football League, Park was educated at Lochaber High School in the Highlands of North West Scotland. Donald Park joined Highland League club Caledonian as a 16-year-old in 1969. He was good friends with George Campbell, who became a professional footballer for Aberdeen FC. As a youth Park also played shinty. Park was capped several times at amateur international level by Scotland whilst with both Inverness Caledonian FC and Hearts FC.

Park turned professional when he signed for Heart of Midlothian in 1972. He spent six seasons at Tynecastle, initially as a winger then latterly as a central midfielder. In September 1978 he was transferred to Partick Thistle, in a swap deal involving Denis McQuade, and he played an important role for the Maryhill Magyars as they perennially fought relegation from the Premier Division. When the Glasgow side suffered demotion, Park returned to Hearts in May 1983. He ended his career with short spells at Brechin City and Meadowbank Thistle.

== Coaching career ==
While he was a player at Meadowbank, Park moved into coaching and he was eventually appointed manager of the club in 1992. He left after a year, and then spent a short time as joint-manager of Arbroath with George Mackie in 1994, before joining Hibs as a coach in July of that year. He served as a youth coach under managers Alex Miller and Alex McLeish, and became the interim manager when McLeish left for Rangers in 2001. When Franck Sauzée was appointed as McLeish's successor, Park was promoted to the position of the assistant manager. Sauzee was sacked by Hibs after only 69 days as manager, and Park left the club at the end of the 2001–02 season. Park was credited with the development of young players including Derek Riordan, Kenny Miller, Ian Murray, Tam McManus and Garry O'Connor.

The departure of Ebbe Skovdahl from Aberdeen in November 2002 led in turn to the recruitment of the successful Inverness manager Steve Paterson and his assistant Duncan Shearer, leaving the Inverness post vacant. Following an extensive interview process, Livingston coach John Robertson was appointed and Park was appointed his assistant. The pair led Inverness to the Scottish First Division title in 2004 and promotion to the Scottish Premier League. Following Craig Levein's move to Leicester City, Robertson and Park were appointed to be the Hearts management team.

Robertson and Park's career at Hearts was brief and, despite reaching two cup semi-finals and achieving a fifth-place finish in the league, they were sacked and replaced by George Burley in 2005. Following the departure of Craig Brewster to Dundee Utd, Inverness appointed Charlie Christie to be interim manager. A number of high-profile names were linked with the vacancy including Park himself. Christie was appointed on 27 January 2006 with Park as his assistant. At the split in the 2005–06 season, Inverness narrowly missed out on a spot in the top half of the SPL.

He resigned as Caley Thistle assistant manager in August 2007 to move back to the Central Belt. He initially took a job with Raith Rovers before being appointed as Mixu Paatelainen's assistant at Hibernian in January 2008. Park served in this role for 18 months before being appointed as Head of Coach Education by the SFA. He was appointed coach of the Scotland under-19 team in August 2017, a position he held until May 2018.
