= Derek O'Connor (footballer, born 1955) =

Scottish footballer

Personal information
- Date of birth: 8 January 1955 (age 71)
- Place of birth: Edinburgh, Scotland
- Position: Forward

Youth career
- Edinburgh Albion

Senior career*
Years	Team	Apps	(Gls)
1973–1976	East Fife	61	(17)
1976–1979	St Johnstone	62	(23)
1979–1984	Heart of Midlothian	127	(47)
1982	→ Berwick Rangers (loan)	10	(6)
1984	→ Meadowbank Thistle (loan)	6	(1)
1984–1985	Dunfermline Athletic	9	(1)
1985	Brechin City	7	(1)
1985–1987	Berwick Rangers	45	(12)
1987–1989	Broxburn Athletic		
1989–1990	Penicuik Athletic		
Total		327	(108)
- * Club domestic league appearances and goals

Derek O'Connor (born 8 January 1955 in Edinburgh) is a Scottish footballer, who played as a forward for several Scottish clubs, including St Johnstone and Heart of Midlothian.

O'Connor lives in Edinburgh with his wife Karen (married November 1974) has two daughters, Ashley (born 1981) and Jenna (born 1984) and six grandchildren.
