= Henry Smith (Scottish footballer) =

Scottish footballer (born 1956)

Personal information
- Full name: Henry George Smith
- Date of birth: 10 March 1956 (age 70)
- Place of birth: Lanark, Scotland
- Height: 6 ft 2 in (1.88 m)
- Position: Goalkeeper

Youth career
- 1976–1977: Frickley Athletic
- 1977–1978: Winterton Rangers

Senior career*
Years	Team	Apps	(Gls)
1978–1981	Leeds United	0	(0)
1981–1996	Heart of Midlothian	476	(0)
1996–2000	Ayr United	47	(1)
2000–2002	Clydebank	26	(0)
2002–2004	Berwick Rangers	1	(0)
Total		516	(0)

International career
1986–1987	Scotland U21	2	(0)
1988–1992	Scotland	3	(0)

Managerial career
- 2003: Whitehill Welfare
- * Club domestic league appearances and goals

Henry George Smith (born 10 March 1956) is a Scottish former footballer, who played as a goalkeeper. He spent the majority of his career with Heart of Midlothian.

He made his debut for Hearts in a League Cup win over Airdrie at Broomfield in 1981.

He won three caps for Scotland between 1988 and 1992 against Saudi Arabia, Northern Ireland and Canada and was part of the Scotland squad at Euro 92. He was perhaps unfortunate to play during a time when Scotland had the services of Jim Leighton and Andy Goram, which restricted his opportunities at international level. Additionally, he played two matches for the under-21s as an overage player.

Smith played in the Home Nations Masters Tournament in March 2009. At 53 years of age, he was the oldest player in the tournament.

== See also ==
- List of footballers in Scotland by number of league appearances (500+)
