= Walter Kidd =

Scottish footballer

Personal information
- Date of birth: 10 March 1958 (age 68)
- Place of birth: Edinburgh, Scotland
- Position: Defender

Team information
- Current team: Livingston (youth team coach)

Senior career*
Years	Team	Apps	(Gls)
1977–1991	Heart of Midlothian	365	(6)
1991–1993	Airdrieonians	63	(0)
1994–1995	Heart of Midlothian	1	(0)
1996–1997	Falkirk	1	(0)
Total		430	(6)
- * Club domestic league appearances and goals

Walter Kidd (born 10 March 1958) is a Scottish former professional football player, who played most of his career as right-back for Heart of Midlothian In total, he represented Hearts as a player for 15 years.

Known for his tough tackling and his 'no nonsense' approach, he was affectionately nicknamed 'Zico' after the Brazilian footballing genius of that name. After leaving the club in 1991 to continue his playing career with Airdrieonians, he returned to Hearts as reserve team coach in 1993, remaining at the club until 1996 when he became assistant manager at Falkirk. He returned to Airdrie in 1999, where he worked until 2001. Since then he has worked as the youth team coach at Livingston.

In May 2014 Walter Kidd was inducted into the Airdrieonians Hall Of Fame at the club's annual Player of the Year Dinner.
