= Roddie MacDonald =

Scottish footballer

Personal information
- Full name: Roderick MacDonald
- Date of birth: 30 August 1954 (age 72)
- Place of birth: Alness, Scotland
- Position: Central defender

Youth career
- 1970–1971: Easter Ross

Senior career*
Years	Team	Apps	(Gls)
1971–1972	Brora Rangers		
1972–1981	Celtic	166	(22)
1981–1987	Heart of Midlothian	173	(22)
1987–1989	Morton	57	(2)
1989–1990	Partick Thistle	17	(0)
1990–1991	Queen of the South	8	(2)
1991–1993	Irvine Meadow XI		
1993–1994	Vale of Leven		

International career
1975	Scotland U23	1	(0)
- * Club domestic league appearances and goals

Roddie MacDonald (born 30 August 1954 in Alness) is a Scottish former footballer. MacDonald started his senior career with Brora Rangers, in the Highland Football League. He then played in the Scottish Football League signing for Celtic in 1972 breaking through title winning 73/74 season. MacDonald remained at Celtic throughout 70's winning 2 further league titles and contributing 80/81 before leaving for Heart of Midlothian F.C.Added to that 3 Scottish cups and 1 League Cup. Morton, Partick Thistle and Queen of the South.

he later became a police officer.
