= 1979–80 Heart of Midlothian F.C. season =

Heart of Midlothian
1979–80 season
- Manager: Willie Ormond (to 8 January); Alex Rennie (caretaker manager 9 January-16 February); Bobby Moncur (from 17 February)
- Stadium: Tynecastle Stadium
- Scottish First Division: 1st
- Scottish Cup: Fourth Round
- League Cup: Section 3
- East of Scotland Shield: Winner
- Top goalscorer: League: Willie Pettigrew (16); All: Willie Pettigrew (20)

During the 1979–80 season, Heart of Midlothian F.C. competed in the Scottish First Division, the Scottish Cup, the Scottish League Cup and the East of Scotland Shield

== Fixtures ==
=== Friendlies ===
28 July 1979 Friendly	Selkirk	0–4	Hearts	Yarrow Park
			Malcolm Robertson; Willie Gibson; Derek O'Connor; Malcolm Robertson	Attendance: 600

2 August 1979 Friendly	Hearts	1–3	Aston Villa	Tynecastle Park
	Cammy Fraser 30'		John Deehan 1'; Ken McNaught 35'; Allan Evans 65' (pen.)	Attendance: 8,000

4 August 1979 Skol Festival Trophy	Hibernian	2–1	Hearts	Easter Road
	Gordon Rae 43'; Colin Campbell 85'		Willie Gibson 38'

6 August 1979 Skol Festival Trophy	Hearts	1–3	Coventry City	Tynecastle Park
	Derek O'Connor		Mark Hateley; Stephen Hunt; Frank Liddell o.g.'

8 August 1979 Skol Festival Trophy	Hearts	1–1	Manchester City	Tynecastle Park
	Cammy Fraser 80'		Mick Channon 85'

20 February 1980 Friendly	Hearts	0–0	Dundee United	Tynecastle Park

11 May 1980 Testimonial	Hearts	3–4	North East XI	Tynecastle Park

=== League Cup ===
1 September 1979 League Cup round 2	Ayr United	2–2	Hearts	Somerset Park
	Brian McLaughlin 20'; Derek Frye 63'		Willie Gibson 53'; Malcolm Robertson 61'	Attendance: 3,558

3 September 1979 League Cup round 2	Hearts	0–1	Ayr United	Tynecastle Park
			Brian McLaughlin 20'	Attendance: 6,801

=== Scottish Cup ===
30 January 1980 Scottish Cup R3	Alloa Athletic	0–1	Hearts	Recreation Park
			Cammy Fraser 34'	Attendance: 3,463

16 February 1980 Scottish Cup R4	Hearts	2–0	Stirling Albion	Tynecastle Park
	Graham Shaw 41'; Graham Shaw 67'			Attendance: 5,979

8 March 1980 Scottish Cup R5	Rangers	6–1	Hearts	Ibrox Park
	Davie Cooper 25'; Sandy Jardine 37' (pen.); Bobby Russell 53'; John MacDonald 73'; John MacDonald 78'; Derek Johnstone 89'		Tom Forsyth 1' (o.g.)	Attendance: 31,000

=== East of Scotland Shield ===
3 October 1979 Semi Final	Hearts	4–3	Berwick Rangers	Tynecastle Park
	Derek Rodier 73'		Roddie MacDonald 17'; Gordon Rae 82' (og.)

=== Scottish First Division ===
11 August 1979 Scottish First Division	Arbroath	1–2	Hearts	Gayfield Park
	Cammy Fraser 25'; Malcolm Robertson 89'		Tommy Yule 75'	Attendance: 2,621

18 August 1979 Scottish First Division	Hearts	4–2	Ayr United	Tynecastle Park
	Willie Gibson 1'; Derek O'Connor 20'; Cammy Fraser 30'; Malcolm Robertson 46'		Bobby Connor 21'; Gordon Crammond 39'	Attendance: 5,732

25 August 1979 Scottish First Division	Berwick Rangers	1–3	Hearts	Shielfield Park
	Eric Tait (15)		Derek O'Connor 11'; Derek O'Connor 53'; Derek O'Connor 56'	Attendance: 4,457

5 September 1979 Scottish First Division	Hearts	2–1	St Johnstone	Tynecastle Park
	Willie Gibson; Willie Gibson		Johnny Hamilton	Attendance: 5,008

8 September 1979 Scottish First Division	Hearts	2–1	Clydebank	Tynecastle Park
	Walter Kidd 64'; Walter Kidd 84'		David A Houston 79'	Attendance: 5,982

11 September 1979 Scottish First Division	Raith Rovers	3–2	Hearts	Stark's Park
	Andy Harrow ?'; Bertie Miller 68'; Bobby Ford 84'		Derek O'Connor 5'; Derek O'Connor ?'	Attendance: 2,539

15 September 1979 Scottish First Division	Hearts	2–1	Stirling Albion	Tynecastle Park
	John Kennedy 17' (o.g.); Willie Gibson 83' (pen.)		Bobby Gray 75'	Attendance: 5,478

19 September 1979 Scottish First Division	Motherwell	4–2	Hearts	Fir Park
	Gordon Soutar 32' (pen.); Brian McLaughlin ?'; Ian Clinging 83'; Mike Larnach 87'		Willie Gibson pen.' Willie Gibson 66' (pen.)	Attendance: 3,551

22 September 1979 Scottish First Division	Hearts	2–2	Airdrieonians	Tynecastle Park
	Derek O'Connor 2'; Cammy Fraser 25'		Willie McGuire 1'; Willie McGuire 6'	Attendance: 5,944

29 September 1979 Scottish First Division	Hearts	4–1	Clyde	Tynecastle Park
	Cammy Fraser 5'; Willie Gibson 10'; Cammy Fraser 20'; Willie Gibson 88' (pen.)		Peter Dolan 48'	Attendance: 5,755

6 October 1979 Scottish First Division	Dumbarton	1–1	Hearts	Boghead Park
	Pat McCluskey 72' (pen.)		Graeme Sinclair 34' (o.g.)	Attendance: 3,500

13 October 1979 Scottish First Division	Hamilton Academical	3–1	Hearts	Douglas Park
	Bobby Graham 21'; Neil Howie 51'; Neil Howie 59'		Cammy Fraser 9'	Attendance: 3,994

20 October 1979 Scottish First Division	Hearts	2–1	Dunfermline Athletic	Tynecastle Park
	Cammy Fraser 30'; Cammy Fraser 77'		Andrew Rolland 66'	Attendance: 6,033

27 October 1979 Scottish First Division	Ayr United	2–0	Hearts	Somerset Park
	Derek Frye 17'; Eric Morris 55'			Attendance: 4,268

3 November 1979 Scottish First Division	Berwick Rangers	0–0	Hearts	Shielfield Park
				Attendance: 2,653

10 November 1979 Scottish First Division	Clydebank	1–1	Hearts	Kilbowie Park
	Joe Sweeney 23'		Cammy Fraser 54'	Attendance: 2,160

17 November 1979 Scottish First Division	Hearts	1–0	Stirling Albion	Tynecastle Park
	Derek O'Connor 89'

24 November 1979 Scottish First Division	Hearts	2–1	Motherwell	Tynecastle Park
	Graham Shaw 30'; Willie Gibson 52'		Bobby Carberry 79'	Attendance: 4,551

1 December 1979 Scottish First Division	Clyde	2–2	Hearts	Shawfield Stadium
	Neil Hood 30'; Gerry McCabe 52'		Cammy Fraser 50'; Derek O'Connor 56'	Attendance: 1,434

8 December 1979 Scottish First Division	Hearts	1–0	Dumbarton	Tynecastle Park
	Des O'Sullivan 90'			Attendance: 4,753

15 December 1979 Scottish First Division	Hearts	0–0	Hamilton Academical	Tynecastle Park
				Attendance: 4,753

5 January 1980 Scottish First Division	Hearts	3–3	Clydebank	Tynecastle Park
	Derek O'Connor 47'; Derek O'Connor 52'; Derek O'Connor 68'		Blair Millar 73'; Gerry Ronald 75'; John McCormack 87'	Attendance: 5,172

12 January 1980 Scottish First Division	Stirling Albion	0–1	Hearts	Annfield Stadium
			Rab Stewart 89'	Attendance: 2,842

19 January 1980 Scottish First Division	Motherwell	0–0	Hearts	Fir Park
				Attendance: 4,971

9 February 1980 Scottish First Division	Dumbarton	1–1	Hearts	Boghead Park
	Tommy McGrain 89'		Bobby Robinson 48'	Attendance: 3,201

23 February 1980 Scottish First Division	Hearts	1–0	Hamilton Academical	Tynecastle Park
	Derek O'Connor 51'			Attendance: 5,416

1 March 1980 Scottish First Division	Hearts	2–1	Arbroath	Tynecastle Park
	Willie Gibson 41' (pen.); Willie Gibson 65'		Ian Harley 14'	Attendance: 4,603

15 March 1980 Scottish First Division	Raith Rovers	0–0	Hearts	Stark's Park
				Attendance: 4,010

25 March 1980 Scottish First Division	Dunfermline Athletic	0–3	Hearts	East End Park
			Willie Gibson 10'; Cammy Fraser 44'; Graham Shaw 62'	Attendance: 4,645

29 March 1980 Scottish First Division	Arbroath	0–1	Hearts	Gayfield Park
			Malcolm Robertson 85'	Attendance: 4,216

1 April 1980 Scottish First Division	Hearts	0–1	Ayr United	Tynecastle Park
			Ally Love 9'	Attendance: 4,577

5 April 1980 Scottish First Division	Airdrieonians	0–1	Hearts	Broomfield Park
			Willie Gibson 44'	Attendance: 6,241

9 April 1980 Scottish First Division	Hearts	2–2	Raith Rovers	Tynecastle Park
	Cammy Fraser 71'; Willie Gibson 82'		Pat Carroll 73' (pen.); Bobby Ford 78'	Attendance: 6,133

13 April 1980 Scottish First Division	Clyde	2–1	Hearts	Shawfield Stadium
	Tommy O'Neill 54'; Tommy O'Neill 88'		Joe Filippi 70' (o.g.)	Attendance: 1,844

16 April 1980 Scottish First Division	St Johnstone	0–1	Hearts	Muirton Park
			Willie Gibson 38'	Attendance: 3,119

19 April 1980 Scottish First Division	Hearts	0–0	Dunfermline Athletic	Tynecastle Park
				Attendance: 6,155

23 April 1980 Scottish First Division	Hearts	1–1	Berwick Rangers	Tynecastle Park
	Frank Liddell 47'		Eric Tait 10'	Attendance: 4,792

26 April 1980 Scottish First Division	St Johnstone	0–3	Hearts	Muirton Park
			Willie Gibson 4'; Jim Jeffries 54'; Willie Gibson 58' (pen.)	Attendance: 3,494

30 April 1980 Scottish First Division	Hearts	1–0	Airdrieonians	Tynecastle Park
	Frank Liddell 87'			Attendance: 13,299

== Scottish First Division table ==
Pos	Team	Pld	W	D	L	GF	GA	GD	Pts	Promotion or relegation
1	Heart of Midlothian (C, P)	39	20	13	6	58	39	+19	53	Promotion to the Premier Division
2	Airdrieonians (P)	39	21	9	9	78	47	+31	51	Promotion to the Premier Division
3	Ayr United	39	16	12	11	64	51	+13	44	
4	Dumbarton	39	19	6	14	59	51	+8	44	
5	Raith Rovers	39	14	15	10	54	46	+8	43	

Source: RSSSF and statto
Rules for classification: 1) points; 2) goal difference; 3) number of goals scored.
(C) Champions; (P) Promoted

== Squad information ==
No.	Pos	Nat	Player	Total		Scottish Premier Division		Scottish Cup		Scottish League Cup	
No.	Pos	Nat	Player	Apps	Goals	Apps	Goals	Apps	Goals	Apps	Goals
	GK	(Scotland) SCO	John Brough	34	0	31	0	3	0	0	0
	FW	(Scotland) SCO	Willie Gibson	44	18	39	17	3	0	2	1
	MF	(Scotland) SCO	Cammy Fraser	41	13	36	12	3	1	2	0
	MF	(Scotland) SCO	Bobby Robinson	39	1	34	1	3	0	2	0
	DF	(Scotland) SCO	Walter Kidd	37	2	34	2	1	0	2	0
	DF	(Scotland) SCO	Jim Denny	37	0	34	0	0	0	3	0
	DF	(Scotland) SCO	Jim Jeffries	36	1	32	1	3	0	1	0
	MF	(Scotland) SCO	Malcolm Robertson	34	4	30	3	2	0	2	1
	MF	(Scotland) SCO	Graham Shaw	25	4	21	2	2	2	2	0
	DF	(Scotland) SCO	Ian Black	20	0	18	0	0	0	2	0
	DF	(Scotland) SCO	Frank Liddell	42	2	37	2	3	0	2	0
	FW	(Scotland) SCO	Derek O'Connor	30	13	27	13	2	0	1	0
	DF	(Scotland) SCO	Colin More	7	0	6	0	0	0	1	0
	DF	(Scotland) SCO	Stephen Hamilton	6	0	5	0	0	0	1	0
	MF	(Scotland) SCO	Lawrie Tierney	7	0	7	0	0	0	0	0
	MF	(Scotland) SCO	Bobby Masterton	19	0	15	0	2	0	2	0
	GK	(Scotland) SCO	Thomson Allan	10	0	8	0	0	0	2	0
	DF	(Scotland) SCO	Crawford Boyd	31	0	28	0	3	0	0	0
	FW	(Scotland) SCO	Pat McShane	2	0	2	0	0	0	0	0
	MF	(Scotland) SCO	Archie White	10	0	10	0	0	0	0	0
	FW	(Scotland) SCO	Rab Stewart	5	1	5	1	0	0	0	0
	FW	(Scotland) SCO	David Scott	4	0	2	0	0	0	2	0
	FW	(Scotland) SCO	Des O'Sullivan	8	1	8	1	0	0	0	0
	FW	(Scotland) SCO	Jim Docherty	5	0	4	0	1	0	0	0

== See also ==
- List of Heart of Midlothian F.C. seasons
