= 1975–76 Heart of Midlothian F.C. season =

Heart of Midlothian
1975–76 season
- Manager: John Hagart
- Stadium: Tynecastle Park
- Scottish Premier Division: 5th
- Scottish Cup: Finalists
- League Cup: Group Stage
- Anglo-Scottish Cup: Second Round
- East of Scotland Shield: Winner

During the 1975–76 season, Heart of Midlothian F.C. competed in the Scottish Premier Division, the Scottish Cup, the Scottish League Cup, the Anglo-Scottish Cup and the East of Scotland Shield.

== Squad ==
Note: Flags indicate national team as defined under FIFA eligibility rules; some limited exceptions apply. Players may hold more than one non-FIFA nationality.

No.	Pos.	Nation	Player
—	GK	SCO	Jim Cruickshank
—	GK	SCO	David Graham
—	DF	SCO	Jim Jefferies
—	DF	SCO	Roy Kay
—	DF	SCO	David Clunie
—	DF	SCO	Jim Brown
—	DF	SCO	Alan Anderson
—	DF	SCO	Sandy Burrell
—	DF	SCO	Arthur Thomson
—	DF	SCO	Don Murray
—	DF	SCO	John Gallacher
—	DF	SCO	Jim Jefferies

No.	Pos.	Nation	Player
—	MF	SCO	Donald Park
—	MF	AUS	Jimmy Cant
—	MF	SCO	Kenny Aird
—	MF	SCO	Ralph Callachan
—	MF	SCO	George Donaldson
—	MF	SCO	Cammy Fraser
—	FW	ENG	Steve Hancock
—	FW	SCO	Graham Shaw
—	FW	SCO	Drew Busby
—	FW	SCO	Donald Ford
—	FW	SCO	Bobby Prentice
—	FW	SCO	Willie Gibson
—	FW	SCO	Graham Shaw

== Fixtures ==
=== Friendlies ===
26 July 1975 Friendly	Hearts	0–0	Roda JC	Tynecastle Park
	Goal

30 July 1975 Friendly	Hearts	0–2	Arsenal	Tynecastle Park
	Goal

8 May 1976 Friendly	Southampton	3–2	Hearts	The Dell
	Goal

19 May 1976 Overseas Tour	SK Brann	0–2	Hearts	Brann Stadion
	Goal			Attendance: 2,700

26 May 1976 Overseas Tour	Christchurch United	1–0	Hearts	English Park
	Goal			Attendance: 4,000

29 May 1976 Overseas Tour	Wellington	0–2	Hearts	Wellington
	Goal

30 May 1976 Overseas Tour	Auckland XI	0–3	Hearts	Newmarket Park
	Goal

2 June 1976 Overseas Tour	New South Wales	2–1	Hearts	Sydney
	Goal			Attendance: 5,000

3 June 1976 Overseas Tour	Northern New South Wales	0–2	Hearts	Newcastle
	Goal

4 June 1976 Overseas Tour	Wollongong City	1–1	Hearts	Wollongong Showground
	Goal

6 June 1976 Overseas Tour	Mauritius XI	1–1	Hearts	Mauritius
	Goal			Attendance: 24,000

=== East of Scotland Shield ===
29 March 1976 Semi-Final	Hearts	1–1	Berwick Rangers	Tynecastle Park

=== Anglo-Scottish Cup ===
2 August 1975 Anglo-Scottish Cup PR1 1st Leg	Queen of the South	2–3	Hearts	Palmerston Park
			Goal

3 September 1975 Anglo-Scottish Cup PR1 2nd Leg	Hearts	3–1	Queen of the South	Tynecastle Park
			Goal

16 September 1975 Anglo-Scottish Cup Quarter-Final 1st Leg	Fulham	3–2	Hearts	Craven Cottage
			Goal

1 October 1975 Anglo-Scottish Cup Quarter-Final 2nd Leg	Hearts	2–2	Fulham	Tynecastle Park
			Goal

=== League Cup ===
9 August 1975 League Cup Group	Dumbarton	2–1	Hearts	Boghead Park
				Attendance: 3,321

13 August 1975 League Cup Group	Hearts	2–0	Celtic	Tynecastle Park
				Attendance: 18,491

16 August 1975 League Cup Group	Aberdeen	1–2	Hearts	Pittodrie Stadium
				Attendance: 8,695

20 August 1975 League Cup Group	Celtic	3–1	Hearts	Celtic Park
				Attendance: 27,314

23 August 1975 League Cup Group	Hearts	1–0	Aberdeen	Tynecastle Park
				Attendance: 9,880

27 August 1975 League Cup Group	Hearts	6–2	Dumbarton	Tynecastle Park
				Attendance: 5,604

=== Scottish Cup ===
24 January 1976 Scottish Cup R3	Hearts	2–2	Clyde	Tynecastle Park
				Attendance: 10,165

28 January 1976 Scottish Cup R3 Replay	Clyde	0–1	Hearts	Shawfield Stadium
				Attendance: 5,378

14 February 1976 Scottish Cup R4	Hearts	1–0	Stirling Albion	Tynecastle Park
				Attendance: 10,396

6 March 1976 Scottish Cup R5	Montrose	2–2	Hearts	Links Park
				Attendance: 8,200

9 March 1976 Scottish Cup R5 Replay	Hearts	2–2	Montrose	Tynecastle Park
				Attendance: 16,228

16 March 1976 Scottish Cup R5 2nd Replay	Hearts	2–1	Montrose	Muirton Park
				Attendance: 10,047

3 April 1976 Scottish Cup Semi-final	Hearts	0–0	Dumbarton	Hampden Park
				Attendance: 16,067

14 April 1976 Scottish Cup Semi-final Replay	Hearts	2–0	Dumbarton	Hampden Park
				Attendance: 11,273

1 May 1976 Scottish Cup Final	Rangers	3–1	Hearts	Hampden Park
				Attendance: 85,982

=== Scottish Premier Division ===
30 August 1975 Scottish Premier Division	Hibernian	1–0	Hearts	Easter Road
				Attendance: 23,646

6 September 1975 Scottish Premier Division	Hearts	0–2	Rangers	Tynecastle Park
				Attendance: 24,803

13 September 1975 Scottish Premier Division	Dundee	2–3	Hearts	Dens Park
				Attendance: 6,707

20 September 1975 Scottish Premier Division	Hearts	2–2	Aberdeen	Tynecastle Park
				Attendance: 8,790

27 September 1975 Scottish Premier Division	Motherwell	1–1	Hearts	Fir Park
				Attendance: 9,333

4 October 1975 Scottish Premier Division	Celtic	3–1	Hearts	Celtic Park
				Attendance: 19,728

11 October 1975 Scottish Premier Division	Hearts	1–0	Dundee United	Tynecastle Park
				Attendance: 8,298

18 October 1975 Scottish Premier Division	Hearts	2–1	Ayr United	Tynecastle Park
				Attendance: 8,268

25 October 1975 Scottish Premier Division	St Johnstone	0–1	Hearts	Muirton Park
	David Dodds 36'			Attendance: 4,763

1 November 1975 Scottish Premier Division	Hearts	1–1	Hibernian	Tynecastle Park
				Attendance: 24,471

8 November 1975 Scottish Premier Division	Rangers	1–2	Hearts	Ibrox Park
				Attendance: 24,304

15 November 1975 Scottish Premier Division	Hearts	1–1	Dundee	Tynecastle Park
				Attendance: 9,304

22 November 1975 Scottish Premier Division	Aberdeen	0–0	Hearts	Pittodrie Stadium
	Doug Rougvie 33'; Neil Simpson 89'			Attendance: 12,378

29 November 1975 Scottish Premier Division	Hearts	3–3	Motherwell	Tynecastle Park
				Attendance: 14,876

6 December 1975 Scottish Premier Division	Hearts	0–1	Celtic	Tynecastle Park
				Attendance: 20,446

13 December 1975 Scottish Premier Division	Dundee United	0–1	Hearts	Tannadice Park
				Attendance: 4,865

20 December 1975 Scottish Premier Division	Ayr United	1–1	Hearts	Somerset Park
				Attendance: 5,442

27 December 1975 Scottish Premier Division	Hearts	2–0	St Johnstone	Tynecastle Park
				Attendance: 8,438

1 January 1976 Scottish Premier Division	Hibernian	3–0	Hearts	Easter Road
				Attendance: 32,923

3 January 1976 Scottish Premier Division	Hearts	1–2	Rangers	Tynecastle Park
				Attendance: 22,196

10 January 1976 Scottish Premier Division	Dundee	4–1	Hearts	Dens Park
				Attendance: 6,568

17 January 1976 Scottish Premier Division	Hearts	3–3	Aberdeen	Tynecastle Park
				Attendance: 9,990

31 January 1976 Scottish Premier Division	Motherwell	2–0	Hearts	Fir Park
				Attendance: 10,054

7 February 1976 Scottish Premier Division	Celtic	2–0	Hearts	Celtic Park
				Attendance: 21,048

21 February 1976 Scottish Premier Division	Hearts	0–1	Dundee United	Tynecastle Park
				Attendance: 6,838

28 February 1976 Scottish Premier Division	Hearts	1–0	Ayr United	Tynecastle Park
				Attendance: 7,518

13 March 1976 Scottish Premier Division	Hearts	0–1	Hibernian	Tynecastle Park
				Attendance: 18,528

20 March 1976 Scottish Premier Division	Rangers	3–1	Hearts	Ibrox Park
				Attendance: 26,818

27 March 1976 Scottish Premier Division	Hearts	3–0	Dundee	Tynecastle Park
				Attendance: 7,768

7 April 1976 Scottish Premier Division	Aberdeen	0–3	Hearts	Pittodrie Stadium
				Attendance: 8,149

10 April 1976 Scottish Premier Division	Hearts	1–2	Motherwell	Tynecastle Park
				Attendance: 11,146

17 April 1976 Scottish Premier Division	Dundee United	2–0	Hearts	Tannadice Park
				Attendance: 6,598

21 April 1976 Scottish Premier Division	Ayr United	0–1	Hearts	Somerset Park
				Attendance: 6,384

24 April 1976 Scottish Premier Division	Hearts	1–0	St Johnstone	Tynecastle Park
				Attendance: 7,964

26 April 1976 Scottish Premier Division	St Johnstone	0–0	Hearts	Muirton Park
				Attendance: 3,101

3 May 1976 Scottish Premier Division	Hearts	1–0	Celtic	Tynecastle Park
				Attendance: 8,537

== Scottish Premier Division table ==
Pos	Team	Pld	W	D	L	GF	GA	GD	Pts	Qualification or relegation
3	Hibernian	36	18	7	11	55	43	+12	43	Qualification for the UEFA Cup first round
4	Motherwell	36	16	8	12	57	49	+8	40	
5	Heart of Midlothian	36	13	9	14	39	45	−6	35	Qualification for the Cup Winners' Cup first round
6	Ayr United	36	14	5	17	46	59	−13	33	
7	Aberdeen	36	11	10	15	49	50	−1	32	

Source: Statto
Rules for classification: 1) points; 2) goal difference; 3) number of goals scored.

== See also ==
- List of Heart of Midlothian F.C. seasons
