= 1980–81 Heart of Midlothian F.C. season =

Heart of Midlothian
1980–81 season
- Chairman: Wallace Mercer
- Manager: Bobby Moncur
- Stadium: Tynecastle Stadium
- Scottish Premier Division: 10th
- Scottish Cup: Third Round
- League Cup: Second Round
- East of Scotland Shield: Winner
- Top goalscorer: League: Willie Pettigrew (16); All: Willie Pettigrew (20)

During the 1980–81 season, Heart of Midlothian F.C. competed in the Scottish Premier Division, the Scottish Cup, the Scottish League Cup, the Anglo-Scottish Cup and the East of Scotland Shield

== Fixtures ==
=== Friendlies ===
26 July 1980 Friendly	Hearts	0–1	Chelsea	Tynecastle Stadium
			Colin Viljoen 70'	Attendance: 6,128

2 August 1980 Friendly	Glenavon	3–3	Hearts	Mourneview Park
	Mickey McDonald 24'; Brenden Tully 41'; Mickey McDonald 62'		Derek O'Connor 18'; Chris Robertson 21'; Chris Robertson 84'	Attendance: 800

4 August 1980 Friendly	Hearts	1–1	Newcastle United	Tynecastle Stadium
	Chris Robertson 55'		Bobby Shinton 26'	Attendance: 3,384

=== Anglo-Scottish Cup ===
30 July 1980 Anglo-Scottish Cup	Hearts	0–3	Airdrieonians	Tynecastle Stadium
			David Thompson 24'; Robert Shearer Russell 69'; David Thompson 77'	Attendance: 2,000

6 August 1980 Anglo-Scottish Cup	Airdrieonians	3–3	Hearts	Broomfield Park
	Tommy Walker 11'; Alexander Clark 73'; Tommy Walker 80'		Chris Robertson 5'; Derek O'Connor 24'; Derek O'Connor 60'	Attendance: 2,843

=== League Cup ===
27 August 1980 League Cup R1 1st leg	Hearts	2–1	Montrose	Tynecastle Stadium
	Chris Robertson 15'; Alex MacDonald 73'		Douglas Robb 84'	Attendance: 4,211

30 August 1980 League Cup R1 2nd leg	Montrose	1–3	Hearts	Links Park
	Mike Milne 48'		Chris Robertson 3'; Chris Robertson 5'; Chris Robertson 17'	Attendance: 1,548

3 September 1980 League Cup R2 1st leg	Hearts	2–3	Ayr United	Tynecastle Stadium
	Chris Robertson 20'; Dave Bowman 47'		Robert Connor 32' (pen.); Ian Cashmore 53'; Robert Connor 89'	Attendance: 5,364

24 September 1980 League Cup R2 2nd leg	Ayr United	4– 0	Hearts	Somerset Park
	Robert Connor 17'; Gerard Christie 84'; Derek Frye 85'; Eric Morris 89'			Attendance: 4,484

=== Scottish Cup ===
24 January 1981 Scottish Cup R3	Morton	0–0	Hearts	Cappielow Park
				Attendance: 6,052

28 January 1981 Scottish Cup R3 Replay	Hearts	1–3	Morton	Tynecastle Stadium
	Alex MacDonald 83'		James Tolmie 43'; James Rooney 82'; Bobby Thomson 86'	Attendance: 5,672

=== East of Scotland Shield ===
13 August 1980 Semi Final	Hearts	0–0	Berwick Rangers	Tynecastle Stadium

20 August 1980 Final	Hearts	2–2	Hibernian	Tynecastle Stadium
	Willie Gibson 34' (pen.); Willie Gibson 40'		Brian Rice 80'; Gordon Rae 89'

=== Scottish Premier Division ===
9 August 1980 Scottish Premier Division	Partick Thistle	3–2	Hearts	Firhill Park
	Tony Higgins 3'; Ian Gibson 58'; Frank Liddell 70' (o.g.)		Frank Liddell 69'; Cammy Fraser 76' (pen.)	Attendance: 3,863

16 August 1980 Scottish Premier Division	Hearts	0–2	Airdrieoians	Tynecastle Stadium
			Alexander Clark 53'; Willie McGuire 61'	Attendance: 6,711

23 August 1980 Scottish Premier Division	St Mirren	1–3	Hearts	St Mirren Park, Love Street
	Doug Somner 17'		Alfie Conn 2'; Derek O'Connor 68'; Derek O'Connor 78'	Attendance: 7,598

6 September 1980 Scottish Premier Division	Kilmarnock	0–1	Hearts	Rugby Park
			Willie Gibson 87'	Attendance: 3,995

13 September 1980 Scottish Premier Division	Hearts	0–2	Celtic	Tynecastle Stadium
			David Provan 32'; Charlie Nicholas 53'	Attendance: 17,169

20 September 1980 Scottish Premier Division	Hearts	0–1	Morton	Tynecastle Stadium
			John McNeil 24'	Attendance: 5,996

27 September 1980 Scottish Premier Division	Dundee United	1–1	Hearts	Tannadice Park
	Davie Dodds 90'		Derek O'Connor 40'	Attendance: 6,263

4 October 1980 Scottish Premier Division	Hearts	0–1	Aberdeen	Tynecastle Stadium
			Doug Rougvie 65'	Attendance: 10,873

11 October 1980 Scottish Premier Division	Rangers	3–1	Hearts	Ibrox Park
	Colin McAdam 50'; Jim Jefferies 77' (o.g.); Colin McAdam 79'		Alex MacDonald 87'	Attendance: 22,443

18 October 1980 Scottish Premier Division	Hearts	0–1	Partick Thistle	Tynecastle Stadium
			Iain Jardine 87'	Attendance: 5,905

25 October 1980 Scottish Premier Division	Airdrieonians	3–0	Hearts	Broomfield Park
	James A March 21'; David Thompson 36'; James A March 38'			Attendance: 4,512

1 November 1980 Scottish Premier Division	Hearts	1–1	St Mirren	Tynecastle Stadium
	Alfie Conn 76'		Doug Somner 18'; McCall 56'	Attendance: 5,707

8 November 1980 Scottish Premier Division	Hearts	0–3	Dundee United	Tynecastle Stadium
			Paul Sturrock 2'; Paul Hegarty 34'; Paul Sturrock 77'	Attendance: 5,875

15 November 1980 Scottish Premier Division	Morton	2–2	Hearts	Cappielow Park
	Joe McLaughlin 49'; James Rooney 73'		Alfie Conn 17'; Derek O'Connor 46'	Attendance: 3,321

22 November 1980 Scottish Premier Division	Hearts	0–0	Rangers	Tynecastle Stadium
				Attendance: 16,315

6 December 1980 Scottish Premier Division	Hearts	2–0	Kilmarnock	Tynecastle Stadium
	Alex MacDonald 57'; Paul O'Brien 59'			Attendance: 5,183

13 December 1980 Scottish Premier Division	Celtic	3–2	Hearts	Celtic Park
	Roddie MacDonald 30'; Frank McGarvey 36'; George McCluskey 46' (pen.)		Alex MacDonald 6'; Willie Gibson 57'	Attendance: 14,070

20 December 1980 Scottish Premier Division	Hearts	0–0	Morton	Tynecastle Stadium
				Attendance: 5,946

27 December 1980 Scottish Premier Division	Dundee United	4–1	Hearts	Tannadice Park
	Paul Sturrock 32'; Ralph Milne 66'; Ralph Milne 68'; Paul Sturrock 79'		Willie Gibson 2'	Attendance: 6,928

1 January 1981 Scottish Premier Division	Hearts	2–3	Airdireonians	Tynecastle Stadium
	Willie Gibson 58'; Paul O'Brien 65'		Jim Rodger 70' Willie McCulloch 85' Willie McCulloch 86'	Attendance: 8,086

3 January 1981 Scottish Premier Division	Partick Thistle	1–0	Hearts	Firhill Park
	Kenny Watson 17' (pen.)			Attendance: 3,904

10 January 1981 Scottish Premier Division	Hearts	0–2	Aberdeen	Tynecastle Stadium
			Walker McCall 34'; Mark McGhee 56'	Attendance: 7,999

31 January 1981 Scottish Premier Division	Hearts	0–3	Celtic	Tynecastle Stadium
			Tommy Burns 31'; Frank McGarvey 49'; Dom Sullivan 68'	Attendance: 14,596

21 February 1981 Scottish Premier Division	St Mirren	2–1	Hearts	St Mirren Park, Love Street
	Frank McDougall 44'; Jackie Copland 76'		Pat McShane 70'	Attendance: 3,412

28 February 1981 Scottish Premier Division	Hearts	1–1	Partick Thistle	Tynecastle Stadium
	Walter Kidd 28'		Tony Higgins 30'	Attendance: 3,491

7 March 1981 Scottish Premier Division	Aberdeen	4–1	Hearts	Pittodrie Stadium
	Walker McCall 34'; Alex Hamill 70' (o.g.); Drew Jarvie 53'; Ian Angus 66'		Alex Hamill 70'	Attendance: 10,208

14 March 1981 Scottish Premier Division	Hearts	2–1	Rangers	Tynecastle Stadium
	Ian Redford 4' (o.g.); Frank Liddell 69'		Ian Redford 43'	Attendance: 11,500

21 March 1981 Scottish Premier Division	Morton	3–0	Hearts	Cappielow Park
	John McNeil 25'; Drew Busby 52'; John McNeil 77'			Attendance: 2,898

24 March 1981 Scottish Premier Division	Kilmarnock	2–0	Hearts	Rugby Park
	Ally Mauchlen 44'; Stuart McLean 81'			Attendance: 1,445

28 March 1981 Scottish Premier Division	Hearts	0–4	Dundee United	Tynecastle Stadium
			Paul Sturrock 1'; Billy Kirkwood 21'; Paul Sturrock 46'; Billy Kirkwood 82'	Attendance: 3,786

1 April 1981 Scottish Premier Division	Celtic	6–0	Hearts	Celtic Park
	George McCluskey 23' (pen.); David Provan 25'; Frank McGarvey 29'; George McCluskey 47'; Murdo MacLeod 62'; Murdo MacLeod 75'			Attendance: 13,228

4 April 1981 Scottish Premier Division	Hearts	1–0	Kilmarnock	Tynecastle Stadium
	Dave Bowman 43'			Attendance: 1,866

11 April 1981 Scottish Premier Division	Aberdeen	1–0	Hearts	Pittodrie Stadium
	Doug Rougvie 85'			Attendance: 6,357

18 April 1981 Scottish Premier Division	Hearts	1–2	St Mirren	Tynecastle Stadium
	Scott Maxwell 5'		Frank McDougall 28'; Alan Logan 68'	Attendance: 2,649

25 April 1981 Scottish Premier Division	Airdrieonans	1–2	Hearts	Broomfield Park
	Alexander Clark 56'		Gary Liddell 42'; Gary Liddell 85'	Attendance: 1,737

2 May 1981 Scottish Premier Division	Rangers	4–0	Hearts	Ibrox Park
	Jim Bett 19'; Bobby Russell 33'; Ian Redford 35'; Willie Johnston 62'			Attendance: 9,770

== Scottish Premier Division table ==
Pos	Team	Pld	W	D	L	GF	GA	GD	Pts	Qualification or relegation
6	Partick Thistle	36	10	10	16	32	48	−16	30	
7	Airdrieonians	36	10	9	17	36	55	−19	29	
8	Morton	36	10	8	18	36	58	−22	28	
9	Kilmarnock (R)	36	5	9	22	23	65	−42	19	Relegation to the 1981–82 Scottish First Division
10	Heart of Midlothian (R)	36	6	6	24	27	71	−44	18	Relegation to the 1981–82 Scottish First Division

Source: Statto
Rules for classification: 1) points; 2) goal difference; 3) number of goals scored.
(R) Relegated

== Squad information ==
No.	Pos	Nat	Player	Total		Scottish Premier Division		Scottish Cup		Scottish League Cup	
No.	Pos	Nat	Player	Apps	Goals	Apps	Goals	Apps	Goals	Apps	Goals
	GK	(Scotland) SCO	John Brough	40	0	34	0	2	0	4	0
	FW	(Scotland) SCO	Willie Gibson	38	4	32	4	2	0	4	0
	MF	(Scotland) SCO	Alex MacDonald	34	5	28	3	2	1	4	1
	DF	(Scotland) SCO	Peter Shields	33	0	30	0	2	0	1	0
	DF	(Scotland) SCO	Walter Kidd	30	1	25	1	2	0	3	0
	DF	(Scotland) SCO	Frank Liddell	30	2	24	2	2	0	4	0
	DF	(Scotland) SCO	Colin More	26	0	24	0	2	0	0	0
	MF	(Scotland) SCO	Bobby Robinson	23	0	19	0	0	0	4	0
	DF	(Scotland) SCO	Alex Hamill	23	1	21	1	2	0	0	0
	MF	(Scotland) SCO	Dave Bowman	22	2	18	1	0	0	4	1
	FW	(Scotland) SCO	Derek O'Connor	20	4	16	4	0	0	4	0
	DF	(Scotland) SCO	Jim Denny	20	0	19	0	0	0	1	0
	MF	(Scotland) SCO	Alfie Conn	19	3	17	3	0	0	2	0
	FW	(Scotland) SCO	Chris Robertson	17	5	13	0	0	0	4	5
	DF	(Scotland) SCO	Jim Jeffries	17	0	13	0	0	0	4	0
	FW	(Scotland) SCO	Paul O'Brien	17	2	15	2	2	0	0	0
	MF	(Scotland) SCO	Gary Mackay	15	0	12	0	2	0	1	0
	DF	(Scotland) SCO	Stephen Hamilton	14	0	12	0	2	0	0	0
	FW	(Scotland) SCO	Gary Liddell	13	2	13	2	0	0	0	0
	MF	(Scotland) SCO	Willie McVie	12	0	12	0	0	0	0	0
	MF	(Scotland) SCO	Bobby Masterton	11	0	11	0	0	0	0	0
	MF	(Scotland) SCO	Malcolm Robertson	9	0	7	0	0	0	2	0
	DF	(Scotland) SCO	Crawford Boyd	8	0	5	0	0	0	3	0
	FW	(Scotland) SCO	Pat McShane	6	1	5	1	1	0	0	0
	MF	(Scotland) SCO	Archie White	4	0	2	0	1	0	1	0
	GK	(Scotland) SCO	Ian Westwater	2	0	2	0	0	0	0	0
	MF	(Scotland) SCO	Cammy Fraser	1	1	1	1	0	0	0	0
	MF	(Scotland) SCO	Scott Maxwell	1	1	1	1	0	0	0	0
	FW	(Scotland) SCO	Jim Docherty	1	0	1	0	0	0	0	0

== See also ==
- List of Heart of Midlothian F.C. seasons
