= 1974–75 Heart of Midlothian F.C. season =

Heart of Midlothian
1974–75 season
- Manager: Bobby Seith (to 11 October); John Hagart (from 12 October)
- Stadium: Tynecastle Park
- Scottish First Division: 8th
- Scottish Cup: Fifth round
- League Cup: Quarter-finalists
- Texaco Cup: Quarter-finalists
- East of Scotland Shield: Winner

During the 1974–75 season, Heart of Midlothian F.C. competed in the Scottish First Division, the Scottish Cup, the Scottish League Cup, the Texaco Cup and the East of Scotland Shield.

== Squad ==
Note: Flags indicate national team as defined under FIFA eligibility rules; some limited exceptions apply. Players may hold more than one non-FIFA nationality.

No.	Pos.	Nation	Player
—	GK	SCO	Jim Cruickshank
—	GK	SCO	Kenny Garland
—	GK	SCO	David Graham
—	DF	SCO	Jim Jefferies
—	DF	SCO	Roy Kay
—	DF	SCO	David Clunie
—	DF	SCO	Jim Brown
—	DF	SCO	Alan Anderson
—	DF	SCO	Ian Sneddon
—	DF	SCO	Sandy Burrell
—	DF	SCO	Arthur Thomson
—	DF	SCO	Billy Bennett
—	DF	SCO	Don Murray
—	DF	SCO	John Gallacher

No.	Pos.	Nation	Player
—	DF	SCO	Jim Jefferies
—	MF	SCO	Tommy Murray
—	MF	SCO	Donald Park
—	MF	AUS	Jimmy Cant
—	MF	SCO	Kenny Aird
—	MF	SCO	Ralph Callachan
—	MF	AUS	John Stevenson
—	MF	SCO	George Donaldson
—	MF	SCO	Cammy Fraser
—	FW	SCO	Drew Busby
—	FW	SCO	Donald Ford
—	FW	SCO	Eric Carruthers
—	FW	SCO	Bobby Prentice
—	FW	SCO	Willie Gibson

== Fixtures ==
=== Friendlies ===
29 July 1974 Friendly	Berwick Rangers	0–1	Hearts	Shielfield Park
	Goal

3 August 1974 Centenarian Match	Hearts	1–1	Tottenham Hotspur	Tynecastle Park
	Goal

10 May 1975 Friendly	Hearts	2–2	Newcastle United	Tynecastle Park
	Goal

12 May 1975 Friendly	Elgin City	0–4	Hearts	Borough Briggs
	Goal

14 May 1975 Friendly	Inverness Caledonian	2–3	Hearts	Telford Street Park
	Goal

16 May 1975 Friendly	Fraserbrugh	1–2	Hearts	Bellslea Park
	Goal

=== East of Scotland Shield ===
29 March 1976 Semi-Final	Hearts	1–1	Berwick Rangers	Tynecastle Park

=== Texaco Cup ===
17 September 1974 Texaco Cup Quarter-Final 1st Leg	Oldham Athletic	1–0	Hearts	Boundary Park
			Goal

30 September 1974 Texaco Cup Quarter-Final 2nd Leg	Hearts	1–1	Oldham Athletic	Tynecastle Park
			Goal

=== League Cup ===
10 August 1974 League Cup Group	Aberdeen	0–1	Hearts	Pittodrie Stadium
				Attendance: 11,304

14 August 1974 League Cup Group	Hearts	2–3	Dunfermline Athletic	Tynecastle Park
				Attendance: 8,421

17 August 1974 League Cup Group	Morton	0–5	Hearts	Cappielow Park
				Attendance: 4,248

21 August 1974 League Cup Group	Dunfermline Athletic	2–1	Hearts	East End Park
				Attendance: 9,147

24 August 1974 League Cup Group	Hearts	2–0	Morton	Tynecastle Park
				Attendance: 8,857

28 August 1974 League Cup Group	Hearts	2–1	Aberdeen	Tynecastle Park
				Attendance: 13,188

11 September 1974 League Cup Quarter-final 1st Leg	Hearts	0–0	Falkirk	Tynecastle Park
				Attendance: 15,694

25 September 1974 League Cup Quarter-Final 2nd Leg	Falkirk	1–0	Hearts	Brockville Park
				Attendance: 8,000

=== Scottish Cup ===
29 January 1975 Scottish Cup R3	Hearts	2–0	Kilmarnock	Tynecastle Park
				Attendance: 21,054

15 February 1975 Scottish Cup R4	Queen of the South	0–2	Hearts	Palmerston Park
				Attendance: 13,794

8 March 1975 Scottish Cup R5	Hearts	1–1	Dundee	Tynecastle Park
				Attendance: 22,197

12 March 1975 Scottish Cup R5 Replay	Dundee	3–2	Hearts	Dens Park
				Attendance: 16,228

=== Scottish First Division ===
31 August 1974 Scottish First Division	Hearts	1–2	St Johnstone	Tynecastle Park
				Attendance: 8,984

7 September 1974 Scottish First Division	Hibernian	2–1	Hearts	Easter Road
				Attendance: 26,560

14 September 1974 Scottish First Division	Hearts	1–1	Kilmarnock	Tynecastle Park
				Attendance: 7,306

21 September 1974 Scottish First Division	Dunfermline Athletic	2–2	Hearts	East End Park
				Attendance: 6,329

28 September 1974 Scottish First Division	Partick Thistle	4–1	Hearts	Firhill Park
				Attendance: 3,366

5 October 1974 Scottish First Division	Hearts	1–4	Aberdeen	Tynecastle Park
				Attendance: 7,922

12 October 1974 Scottish First Division	Dundee United	5–0	Hearts	Tannadice Park
				Attendance: 7,424

19 October 1974 Scottish First Division	Hearts	2–1	Airdrieonians	Tynecastle Park
				Attendance: 7,471

26 October 1974 Scottish First Division	Hearts	1–1	Rangers	Tynecastle Park
				Attendance: 27,094

2 November 1974 Scottish First Division	Ayr United	3–3	Hearts	Somerset Park
				Attendance: 5,077

9 November 1974 Scottish First Division	Hearts	2–1	Dumbarton	Tynecastle Park
				Attendance: 8,994

16 November 1974 Scottish First Division	Arbroath	3–1	Hearts	Gayfield Park
				Attendance: 3,458

23 November 1974 Scottish First Division	Hearts	1–1	Celtic	Tynecastle Park
				Attendance: 21,878

30 November 1974 Scottish First Division	Clyde	2–2	Hearts	Shawfield Stadium
				Attendance: 2,827

7 December 1974 Scottish First Division	Hearts	3–1	Morton	Tynecastle Park
				Attendance: 7,469

14 December 1974 Scottish First Division	Motherwell	1–3	Hearts	Fir Park
				Attendance: 5,142

21 December 1974 Scottish First Division	Hearts	0–0	Dundee	Tynecastle Park
				Attendance: 10,180

28 December 1974 Scottish First Division	St Johnstone	2–3	Hearts	Muirton Park
				Attendance: 5,088

1 January 1975 Scottish First Division	Hearts	0–0	Hibernian	Tynecastle Park
				Attendance: 35,969

4 January 1975 Scottish First Division	Kilmarnock	1–1	Hearts	Rugby Park
				Attendance: 7,233

11 January 1975 Scottish First Division	Hearts	1–0	Dunfermline Athletic	Dens Park
				Attendance: 12,258

18 January 1975 Scottish First Division	Hearts	3–1	Partick Thistle	Tynecastle Park
				Attendance: 10,972

1 February 1975 Scottish First Division	Aberdeen	2–2	Hearts	Pittodrie Stadium
				Attendance: 11,487

8 February 1975 Scottish First Division	Hearts	3–1	Dundee United	Tynecastle Park
				Attendance: 12,056

22 February 1975 Scottish First Division	Airdrieonians	1–1	Hearts	Broomfield Park
				Attendance: 6,546

1 March 1975 Scottish First Division	Rangers	2–1	Hearts	Ibrox Park
				Attendance: 39,425

15 March 1975 Scottish First Division	Dumbarton	0–1	Hearts	Boghead Park
				Attendance: 3,157

19 March 1975 Scottish First Division	Hearts	1–0	Ayr United	Tynecastle Park
				Attendance: 7,549

22 March 1975 Scottish First Division	Hearts	0–0	Arbroath	Tynecastle Park
				Attendance: 8,035

29 March 1975 Scottish First Division	Celtic	4–1	Hearts	Celtic Park
				Attendance: 20,143

5 April 1975 Scottish First Division	Hearts	0–1	Clyde	Tynecastle Park
				Attendance: 5,854

12 April 1975 Scottish First Division	Morton	0–0	Hearts	Cappielow Park
				Attendance: 1,761

19 April 1975 Scottish First Division	Hearts	4–1	Motherwell	Tynecastle Park
				Attendance: 7,649

23 April 1975 Scottish First Division	Dundee	2–0	Hearts	Dens Park
				Attendance: 4,949

== See also ==
- List of Heart of Midlothian F.C. seasons
