= 1976 Scottish Cup final =

1976 Scottish Cup Final
- Event: 1975–76 Scottish Cup
| Rangers | Heart of Midlothian |
| 3 | 1 |
- Date: 1 May 1976
- Venue: Hampden Park, Glasgow
- Referee: Bobby Davidson
- Attendance: 83,354
- Weather: Rain

The 1976 Scottish Cup Final was played on 1 May 1976 at Hampden Park in Glasgow and was the final of the 91st Scottish Cup. Rangers and Hearts contested the match, Rangers won the match 3–1 with Derek Johnstone (2) and Alex MacDonald scoring for Rangers, Graham Shaw getting the goal for Hearts.

Rangers dominated the game from the whistle with Johnstone scoring after only 42 seconds, the quickest goal scored in the Cup final. The referee had kicked off the match a couple of minutes early so the goal was scored before the official kick-off time. MacDonald put them two up just before the break and Johnstone wrapped it up with a third in 81 minutes. Shaw scored a consolation for Hearts in the 83rd minute.

The win sealed the third treble for Rangers and was their 21st Scottish Cup win.

== Match details ==
1 May 1976

| Rangers | 3 – 1 | Heart of Midlothian |
|---|---|---|
| Derek Johnstone 1', 81'; Alex MacDonald 44' | Report (page 18) | Graham Shaw 83' |

Hampden Park, Glasgow
Attendance: 85,354
Referee: Bobby Davidson

| GK | (Scotland) Peter McCloy |
| DF | (Scotland) Alex Miller |
| DF | (Scotland) Colin Jackson |
| DF | (Scotland) John Greig (c) |
| DF | (Scotland) Tom Forsyth |
| MF | (Scotland) Tommy McLean |
| MF | (Scotland) Bobby McKean |
| MF | (Scotland) Johnny Hamilton | (substituted off) ?' |
| MF | (Scotland) Alex MacDonald |
| FW | (Scotland) Derek Johnstone |
| FW | (Scotland) Martin Henderson |
Substitutes:
| DF | (Scotland) Sandy Jardine | (substituted on) ?' |
Manager:
(Scotland) Jock Wallace

GK | (Scotland) Jim Cruickshank
DF | (Scotland) Roy Kay
DF | (Scotland) Jim Jefferies
DF | (Scotland) John Gallacher
DF | (Scotland) Sandy Burrell | (substituted off) ?'
MF | (Scotland) Jim Brown (c)
MF | (Scotland) Graham Shaw
MF | (Scotland) Ralph Callachan
MF | (Scotland) Bobby Prentice
FW | (Scotland) Willie Gibson | (substituted off) ?'
FW | (Scotland) Drew Busby
Substitutes:
MF | (Scotland) Kenny Aird | (substituted on) ?'
FW | (Scotland) Donald Park | (substituted on) ?'
Manager:
(Scotland) John Hagart
