= 1975–76 Celtic F.C. season =

Celtic
1975–76 season
- Manager: Jock Stein; Sean Fallon (acting manager)
- Stadium: Celtic Park
- Scottish Premier Division: 2nd
- Scottish Cup: 3rd Round
- Scottish League Cup: Finalists
- European Cup Winners' Cup: Quarter-finals

During the 1975–76 Scottish football season, Celtic competed in the Scottish Premier Division.

Celtic failed to win any major honour for the first time since the 1963-64 season. Assistant Manager Sean Fallon was acting manager for most of the season as Manager Jock Stein suffered a serious car accident that required months of recovery.

Celtic reached the finals of the League Cup, where they lost to Rangers, and lost in the third round of the Scottish Cup to Motherwell.

In the European Cup Winners' Cup, they reached the Quarter-finals, where they drew 1-1 on aggregate to East Germany cup champions Sachsenring Zwickau and lost 5-4 on penalties. In earlier rounds, they had defeated Iceland's Valur and Portugal's Boavista.

== Squad ==
Note: Flags indicate national team as defined under FIFA eligibility rules; some limited exceptions apply. Players may hold more than one non-FIFA nationality.

No.	Pos.	Nation	Player
—	GK	ENG	Peter Latchford
—	GK	SCO	Denis Connaghan
—	GK	SCO	Ally Hunter
—	GK	SCO	Graham Barclay
—	DF	SCO	Danny McGrain
—	DF	SCO	Andy Lynch
—	DF	SCO	Pat McCluskey
—	DF	SCO	Frank Welsh
—	DF	SCO	Roddie MacDonald
—	DF	SCO	Jackie McNamara Sr.
—	DF	SCO	Roy Aitken
—	DF	ISL	Jóhannes Eðvaldsson
—	MF	SCO	George Connelly
—	MF	SCO	Tommy Callaghan

No.	Pos.	Nation	Player
—	MF	SCO	Brian McLaughlin
—	MF	SCO	Tommy Burns
—	MF	SCO	Steve Murray
—	MF	SCO	Ronnie Glavin
—	MF	SCO	Jim Casey
—	MF	SCO	Johnny Doyle
—	MF	SCO	Bobby Hannah
—	FW	SCO	Bobby Lennox
—	FW	SCO	Harry Hood
—	FW	SCO	Kenny Dalglish
—	FW	SCO	Dixie Deans
—	FW	SCO	Paul Wilson
—	FW	SCO	Andy Ritchie
—	FW	SCO	George McCluskey

== Competitions ==
=== Scottish Premier Division ===
==== League table ====
Pos	Team	Pld	W	D	L	GF	GA	GD	Pts	Qualification or relegation
1	Rangers (C)	36	23	8	5	60	24	+36	54	Qualification for the European Cup first round
2	Celtic	36	21	6	9	71	42	+29	48	Qualification for the UEFA Cup first round
3	Hibernian	36	18	7	11	55	43	+12	43	Qualification for the UEFA Cup first round
4	Motherwell	36	16	8	12	57	49	+8	40	
5	Heart of Midlothian	36	13	9	14	39	45	−6	35	Qualification for the Cup Winners' Cup first round

Source: Statto
Rules for classification: 1) points; 2) goal difference; 3) number of goals scored.
(C) Champions

==== Matches ====
30 August 1975 Premier League	Rangers	2–1	Celtic	Glasgow
15:00				Stadium: Ibrox Park; Attendance: 70,964

6 September 1975 Premier League	Celtic	4–0	Dundee	Glasgow
15:00				Stadium: Celtic Park; Attendance: 24,504

13 September 1975 Premier League	Motherwell	1–1	Celtic	Glasgow
15:00				Stadium: Celtic Park; Attendance: 18,612

20 September 1975 Premier League	St Johnstone	1–2	Celtic	Perth
15:00				Stadium: Muirton Park; Attendance: 11,703

27 September 1975 Premier League	Celtic	2–1	Dundee United	Glasgow
15:00 BST				Stadium: Celtic Park; Attendance: 19,986

4 October 1975 Premier League	Celtic	3–1	Hearts	Glasgow
15:00 BST				Stadium: Celtic Park; Attendance: 19,728

11 October 1975 Premier League	Aberdeen	1–2	Celtic	Aberdeen
15:00 BST				Stadium: Pittodrie Stadium; Attendance: 17,868

1 November 1975 Premier League	Celtic	1–1	Rangers	Glasgow
15:00 BST				Stadium: Celtic Park; Attendance: 52,225

8 November 1975 Premier League	Dundee	1–0	Celtic	Dundee
15:00 BST				Stadium: Dens Park; Attendance: 16,456

12 November 1975 Premier League	Ayr United	2–7	Celtic	Ayr
19:30 BST				Stadium: Somerset Park; Attendance: 12,140

15 November 1975 Premier League	Celtic	0–2	Motherwell	Glasgow
15:00 BST				Stadium: Celtic Park; Attendance: 32,399

22 November 1975 Premier League	Celtic	3–2	St Johnstone	Glasgow
15:00 BST				Stadium: Celtic Park; Attendance: 18,517

29 November 1975 Premier League	Dundee United	1–3	Celtic	Dundee
15:00 GMT				Stadium: Tannadice Park; Attendance: 11,846

6 December 1975 Premier League	Hearts	0–1	Celtic	Edinburgh
15:00 GMT				Stadium: Tynecastle Park; Attendance: 20,446

10 December 1975 Premier League	Celtic	1–1	Hibernian	Glasgow
19:30 GMT				Stadium: Celtic Park; Attendance: 39,918

13 December 1975 Premier League	Celtic	0–2	Aberdeen	Glasgow
15:00 GMT				Stadium: Celtic Park; Attendance: 23,156

20 December 1975 Premier League	Hibernian	1–3	Celtic	Edinburgh
19:30 GMT				Stadium: Easter Road; Attendance: 21,136

27 December 1975 Premier League	Celtic	3–1	Ayr United	Glasgow
15:00 GMT				Stadium: Celtic Park; Attendance: 21,238

1 January 1976 Premier League	Rangers	1–0	Celtic	Glasgow
15:00 GMT				Stadium: Ibrox Park; Attendance: 57,797

3 January 1976 Premier League	Celtic	3–3	Dundee	Glasgow
15:00 GMT				Stadium: Celtic Park; Attendance: 19,968

10 January 1976 Premier League	Motherwell	1–3	Celtic	Motherwell
15:00 GMT				Stadium: Fir Park; Attendance: 18,092

17 January 1976 Premier League	St Johnstone	3–4	Celtic	Perth
15:00 GMT				Stadium: Muirton Park; Attendance: 9,951

31 January 1976 Premier League	Celtic	2–1	Dundee United	Glasgow
15:00 GMT				Stadium: Celtic Park; Attendance: 17,007

7 February 1976 Premier League	Celtic	2–0	Hearts	Glasgow
15:00 GMT				Stadium: Celtic Park; Attendance: 21,048

21 February 1976 Premier League	Aberdeen	0–1	Celtic	Aberdeen
15:00 GMT				Stadium: Pittodrie Stadium; Attendance: 19,214

28 February 1976 Premier League	Celtic	4–0	Hibernian	Glasgow
15:00 GMT				Stadium: Celtic Park; Attendance: 32,059

20 March 1976 Premier League	Dundee	0–1	Celtic	Dundee
15:00 GMT				Stadium: Dens Park; Attendance: 14,830

27 March 1976 Premier League	Celtic	4–0	Motherwell	Glasgow
15:00 GMT				Stadium: Celtic Park; Attendance: 27,934

3 April 1976 Premier League	Celtic	1–0	St Johnstone	Glasgow
15:00 GMT				Stadium: Celtic Park; Attendance: 15,126

10 April 1976 Premier League	Dundee United	3–2	Celtic	Dundee
15:00 GMT				Stadium: Tannadice Park; Attendance: 12,771

17 April 1976 Premier League	Celtic	1–1	Aberdeen	Glasgow
15:00 BST				Stadium: Celtic Park; Attendance: 28,608

21 April 1976 Premier League	Hibernian	2–0	Celtic	Edinburgh
19:30 BST				Stadium: Easter Road; Attendance: 19,076

24 April 1976 Premier League	Celtic	1–2	Ayr United	Glasgow
15:00 BST				Stadium: Celtic Park; Attendance: 15,486

26 April 1976 Premier League	Celtic	0–0	Rangers	Glasgow
15:00 BST				Stadium: Celtic Park; Attendance: 51,142

1 May 1976 Premier League	Ayr United	3–5	Celtic	Ayr
15:00 BST				Stadium: Somerset Park; Attendance: 6,802

3 May 1976 Premier League	Hearts	1–0	Celtic	Edinburgh
15:00 BST				Stadium: Tynecastle Park; Attendance: 8,537

=== Scottish Cup ===
24 January 1976 Third round	Motherwell	3–2	Celtic	Motherwell
15:00 GMT				Stadium: Fir Park; Attendance: 25,000

=== Scottish League Cup ===
9 August 1975 Group 3	Celtic	1–0	Aberdeen	Glasgow
15:00 GMT				Stadium: Celtic Park; Attendance: 31,819

13 August 1975 Group 3	Hearts	2–0	Celtic	Edinburgh
19:30 GMT				Stadium: Tynecastle Park; Attendance: 18,491

16 August 1975 Group 3	Celtic	3–1	Dumbarton	Glasgow
15:00 GMT				Stadium: Celtic Park; Attendance: 21,804

20 August 1975 Group 3	Celtic	3–1	Hearts	Glasgow
19:30 GMT				Stadium: Celtic Park; Attendance: 27,314

23 August 1975 Group 3	Dumbarton	0–8	Celtic	Dumbarton
15:00 GMT				Stadium: Boghead Park; Attendance: 11,255

27 August 1975 Group 3	Aberdeen	0–2	Celtic	Aberdeen
19:30 GMT				Stadium: Pittodrie Stadium; Attendance: 13,984

10 September 1975 Quarter-final 1st leg	Stenhousemuir	0–2	Celtic	Stenhousemuir
19:30 GMT				Stadium: Ochilview Park; Attendance: 8,075

24 September 1975 Quarter-final 2nd leg	Celtic	1–0 (3–0 agg.)	Stenhousemuir	Glasgow
19:30 GMT				Stadium: Celtic Park; Attendance: 2,658

6 October 1975 Semi-final	Partick Thistle	0–1	Celtic	Glasgow
19:30 GMT				Stadium: Hampden Park; Attendance: 31,421

25 October 1975 Final	Rangers	1–0	Celtic	Glasgow
15:00 GMT				Stadium: Hampden Park; Attendance: 58,706

=== European Cup Winners' Cup ===
16 September 1975 1st round 1st leg	Valur (Iceland)	0–2	(Scotland) Celtic	Reykjavík
19:00 GMT				Stadium: Laugardalsvöllur; Attendance: 9,000

1 October 1975 1st round 2nd leg	Celtic (Scotland)	7–0 (9–0 agg.)	(Iceland) Valur	Glasgow
20:00 GMT				Stadium: Celtic Park; Attendance: 16,000

22 October 1975 2nd round 1st leg	Boavista (Portugal)	0–0	(Scotland) Celtic	Porto
20:00 GMT				Stadium: Estádio do Bessa; Attendance: 15,000

5 November 1975 2nd round 2nd leg	Celtic (Scotland)	3–1 (3–1 agg.)	(Portugal) Boavista	Glasgow
20:00 GMT				Stadium: Celtic Park; Attendance: 37,000

3 March 1976 Quarter-final 1st leg	Celtic (Scotland)	1–1	(East Germany) Sachsenring Zwickau	Glasgow
20:00 GMT				Stadium: Celtic Park; Attendance: 46,000

17 March 1976 Quarter-final 2nd leg	Sachsenring Zwickau (East Germany)	1–0 (2–1 agg.)	(Scotland) Celtic	Zwickau
14:00 GMT				Stadium: Georgi Dimitroff Stadion; Attendance: 40,024

=== Glasgow Cup ===
4 August 1975 Semi-final	Clyde	1–2	Celtic	Glasgow
19:30 BST				Stadium: Shawfield Stadium; Attendance: 7,000

Final delayed until the following season

8 August 1976 Final	Celtic	1–3	Rangers	Glasgow
19:30 BST				Stadium: Celtic Park; Attendance: 55,000
