= List of Falkirk F.C. managers =

This chronological list of managers of Falkirk Football Club comprises all those who have held the position of manager of the first team of Falkirk since the position was created in 1905. Prior to 1905 all manager appointments were assigned to the person in the position of club secretary. The most successful person to manage the club is Jim Jefferies, who won two First Division championships and one Scottish Challenge Cup during his five years as manager. However, Willie Nicol has managed Falkirk to their highest league ranking, runners-up in Scotland in both 1907–08 and 1909–10. To date, every person to have managed the club has been from the United Kingdom or Republic of Ireland.

== Managers ==
This list does not include caretaker managers or those who managed in a temporary capacity

Information correct as of January 2022. Only competitive matches are counted

Name	Nationality	From	To	P	W	D	L	Win % (Note: Win% is rounded to two decimal places)	Honours	Notes
Willie Nicol	Scotland	July 1905	February 1924	732	285	187	260	38.93	1 Scottish Cup, 2 Division One runners-up, 1 Division Two runners-up	
David Reid	Scotland	February 1924	October 1927	155	61	37	57	39.35	–	
John Richardson	Scotland	November 1927	May 1932	197	75	35	87	38.07	–	
Willie Orr	Scotland	August 1932	March 1935	115	42	17	56	36.52	–	
Tully Craig	Scotland	April 1935	May 1950	577	262	112	203	45.41	1 Division Two championship, 1 Scottish League Cup runners-up	
Bob Shankly	Scotland	August 1950	December 1956	257	88	50	119	34.24	1 Division Two runners-up	
Reg Smith	England	January 1957	May 1959	104	38	23	43	36.54	1 Scottish Cup	
Tommy Younger	Scotland	August 1959	March 1960	39	15	10	14	38.46	–	
Alex McCrae	Scotland	April 1960	April 1965	216	77	36	103	35.65	1 Division Two runners-up	
Sammy Kean	Scotland	July 1965	December 1966	61	21	7	33	34.43	–	
John Prentice	Scotland	December 1966	September 1968	74	18	19	37	24.32	–	
Willie Cunningham	Northern Ireland	October 1968	April 1973	207	80	47	80	38.65	1 Division Two championship	
John Prentice	Scotland	August 1973	August 1975	95	40	18	37	42.11	1 Division Two championship	
George Miller	Scotland	September 1975	March 1977	64	19	12	33	29.69	–	
Billy Little	Scotland	April 1977	May 1979	91	36	31	24	39.56	–	
John Hagart	Scotland	August 1979	November 1982	152	51	40	61	33.55	1 Second Division championship	
Alex Totten	Scotland	November 1982	November 1983	41	20	7	14	48.78	–	
Gregor Abel	Scotland	November 1982	November 1983	11	3	1	7	27.27	–	
Billy Lamont	Scotland	February 1984	February 1987	131	48	30	53	36.64	1 First Division runners-up	
Dave Clarke	Scotland	February 1987	August 1988	65	12	18	35	18.46	–	
Jim Duffy	Scotland	September 1988	October 1989	53	27	11	15	50.94	1 First Division runners-up	
Billy Lamont	Scotland	November 1989	April 1990	21	9	8	4	42.86	–	
Jim Jefferies	Scotland	August 1990	August 1995	237	98	61	78	41.35	2 First Division championships, 1 Scottish Challenge Cup	
John Lambie	Scotland	August 1995	March 1996	32	7	5	20	21.88	–	
Eamonn Bannon	Scotland	May 1996	December 1996	20	9	3	8	45.00	–	
Alex Totten	Scotland	December 1996	April 2002	240	114	53	73	47.50	1 Scottish Cup runners-up, 1 Scottish Challenge Cup, 2 First Division runners-up	
Ian McCall	Scotland	May 2002	January 2003	27	18	6	3	66.67	–	
Owen Coyle John Hughes	Ireland; Scotland	January 2003	May 2003	19	12	3	4	63.16	1 First Division championship	
John Hughes	Scotland	May 2003	June 2009	263	105	57	101	39.92	1 First Division championship, 1 Scottish Challenge Cup, 1 Scottish Cup runners-up	
Eddie May	Scotland	June 2009	February 2010	27	4	8	15	14.81	–	
Steven Pressley	Scotland	February 2010	March 2013	105	44	28	33	41.90	1 Scottish Challenge Cup	
Gary Holt	Scotland	April 2013	June 2014	52	25	11	16	48.08	–	
Peter Houston	Scotland	June 2014	September 2017	153	71	42	40	46.41	1 Scottish Cup runners-up	
Paul Hartley	Scotland	October 2017	August 2018	41	17	8	16	41.46	–	
Ray McKinnon	Scotland	August 2018	November 2019	55	17	18	20	30.91	–	
David McCracken & Lee Miller	Scotland	November 2019	April 2021	43	23	10	10	53.49	–	
Paul Sheerin	Scotland	May 2021	December 2021	23	8	4	11	34.78	–	
