= Annan Athletic F.C. =

Association football club in Scotland

Annan Athletic
- Full name: Annan Athletic Football Club
- Nicknames: Black and Golds; Galabankies
- Founded: 1942; 84 years ago
- Ground: Galabank, Annan
- Capacity: 2,504 (500 seated)
- Coordinates: 54.994796°N 3.261181°W
- Chairman: Russell Brown
- Manager: Willie Gibson
- League: Scottish League Two
- 2025–26: Scottish League Two, 7th of 10
- Website: annanathleticfc.com
Home colours	Away colours

Annan Athletic Football Club is a Scottish association football club based in the town of Annan, Dumfries and Galloway. The club was founded in 1942 and competes in Scottish League Two as a member of the Scottish Professional Football League.

The club competed in Scottish junior football and English regional leagues before becoming a member of the Scottish Football Association in 1978 which made the club eligible to compete in the Scottish Cup for the first time. Annan Athletic won the South of Scotland League twice and the East of Scotland League four times before successfully applying to join the Scottish Football League (SFL) in 2008.

Annan Athletic's best finish in the SPFL is ninth in League One in 2024–25 whilst its best result in the Scottish Cup is reaching the fifth round in 2021–22. The club plays its home games at Galabank in the north of Annan.

== History ==
Founded in December 1942 as Annan Air Training Corps, the club changed their name to Annan Athletic the following April. They entered the Dumfries and District Youth League, but this competition lasted only throughout the war years, and in 1945 they joined the Dumfries and District Junior League instead. They had a fairly successful time as a junior club, reaching the fifth round of the Scottish Junior Cup on one occasion (losing 2–1 to Perth side Jeanfield Swifts).

In 1950–51 the Dumfries and District Junior League had to be wound up due to lack of officials, and the following season (1951–52) the club had to go into abeyance as the Junior Association would not release them from their membership. For the following season (1952–1953) Annan Athletic joined the Carlisle and District League and the Cumberland Football Association. This proved an astute move when Annan Athletic won every competition they entered bar one in their first season in membership.

Annan remained members of the Carlisle and District League until they moved back to Scottish football in the 1977–78 season when they joined the South of Scotland Football League. This switch, along with some upgrade work to their Galabank ground also allowed the club to compete in the qualifying stages of the Scottish Cup as well.

The club proved very successful in the South League, winning every competition that was available to them. In an attempt to get more competitive football, they joined the East of Scotland Football League in season 1987–88, although they maintained their commitment to the South League by running a reserve side. They won promotion in their first season in the East League, and two years later won the Premier Division. They became one of the league's top sides and qualified for the Scottish Cup's early rounds on various occasions.

=== Scottish Football League ===
Annan applied to join the Scottish Football League in 2000, when two new clubs were admitted, but lost out to Peterhead and Elgin City. Following the demise of local rivals Gretna in 2008, Annan applied along with four other clubs to replace them in the Third Division. They were the successful candidate, being chosen due to the standard of their facilities, ahead of Cove Rangers, Spartans, Preston Athletic and Edinburgh City.

Their first league match as a professional team ended in a 4–1 win over Cowdenbeath in the 2008–09 season. They finished 7th that season and 8th in the next season (however, they reached the semi-finals of the Scottish Challenge Cup). They were challenging for promotion to the Second Division in the 2010–11 season, their 3rd season in Scottish senior football. They finished 4th and qualified for the play-off final after a win over Alloa Athletic in play-off semi-finals (2–1, 0–0). They played Albion Rovers in the two-legged final, however, they lost the tie 4–3 on aggregate (1–3, 2–1), meaning that they missed out on promotion to the Second Division.

After the first quarter of the 2011–12 season, Annan sat top of the league, three points clear. Also, for the second time since becoming SFL members in 2008, they reached the semi-finals of the 2011–12 Scottish Challenge Cup. Later as the season progressed Annan dropped points and fell into mid table; they would then finish the season in 6th place, 8 points off the play-off places and 28 points off first position. A 3–0 defeat to First Division Falkirk ended their hopes of a first Challenge Cup Final.

During the 2012–13 season, Annan secured a 0–0 draw at home to Rangers on 15 September 2012, in what was the first-ever league meeting between the two sides. In the same season, on 9 March, Annan beat Rangers 2–1 at Ibrox, the first win for the club after the appointment of Jim Chapman as manager in January.

A second-place finish in the newly named SPFL League Two the following season included the clubs record points tally and saw them face Stirling Albion in the play-offs. After losing the first leg 3–1 the return leg at Galabank was an 8-goal thriller, Annan eventually losing 8–4 on aggregate.

In 2014–15 Annan produced an upset with a 3–2 win over Championship side Livingston in the Scottish Cup.

2015–2016 saw Annan miss out on the play-offs on goal difference as a final day 1–0 win over Queens Park proved not enough, the visitors pipping them to the spot by one goal. The season highlight once again came in the Scottish Cup after the first in what was to become a series of cup wins over Premiership side Hamilton.

Forfar Athletic defeated Annan 6–4 on aggregate the following season in the play-offs, which signalled the end of Jim Chapmans reign.

In 2017 Irishman Peter Murphy became only the third manager of Annan Athletic whilst an SPFL club, his first managerial role.

On 19 May 2023, they defeated Clyde 2–1 to earn a 5–2 aggregate play-off victory and seal promotion to Scottish League One, the club's first promotion to the third tier.

== Rivalries ==
Annan Athletic's local derby rivals are Queen of the South. It is often a familiar battle as many players played for both clubs, with even some people supporting both teams. Two teams from Dumfries and Galloway, Annan F.C. and Queen of the South Wanderers, played each other in the Scottish Cup in 1878 and 1879, although neither are connected to the current clubs.

The rivalry with Stranraer is less local but has become an increasingly more competitive derby with many red cards seen in recent matches as the sides frequently meet in Scotland's fourth tier. Despite both clubs being in the same county, the distance between the grounds is 88 miles.

Due to both being in the same division for many seasons, games against Clyde have become a day to look forward to for Annan fans as the clubs built up a rivalry which was only intensified when Annan manager Jim Chapman left to take charge of the Bully Wee and a large portion of players followed him.

Berwick Rangers are a cross-border rival of Annan.

Gretna 2008 are a friendly opponent of the Galabankies, with the Black and Whites frequently inviting the Black and Golds to their annual Raydale Park Cup competition. Annan have also shown kindness by welcoming the phoenix club to Galabank when their pitch was getting resurfaced. Annan took the Scottish Football League place of the now defunct Gretna in 2008.

== Stadium ==
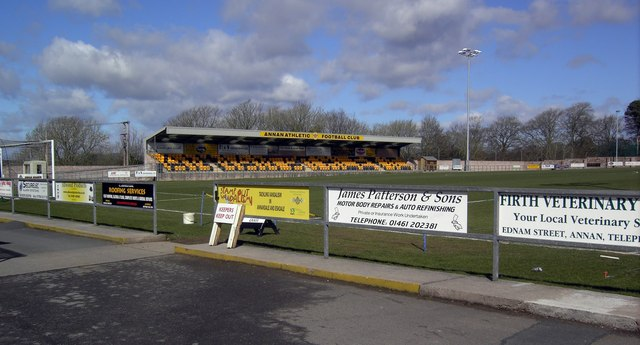
Galabank in 2009

Annan played at Mafeking Park from 1946 to 1953, when they moved to their present ground at Galabank. The ground has a capacity of 2,504, including 500 seats.

== Current squad ==
As of 28 August 2026

Note: Flags indicate national team as defined under FIFA eligibility rules; some limited exceptions apply. Players may hold more than one non-FIFA nationality.

No.	Pos.	Nation	Player
1	GK	ENG	Charlie Albinson
2	DF	SCO	Scott Hooper
3	DF	SCO	Cammy Clark
4	MF	SCO	Kirk McKnight
5	DF	SCO	Aaron Muirhead
6	DF	SCO	Keith Watson
7	MF	ENG	Josh Dixon
8	MF	SCO	Paul Smith
9	FW	SCO	Aidan Smith
10	FW	SCO	Tommy Muir (captain)
11	MF	SCO	Dylan Williams (on loan from Airdrieonians)

No.	Pos.	Nation	Player
12	GK	POL	Milosz Sliwinski (on loan from Queen's Park)
14	MF	SCO	Cole Williams (co-operation loan with Airdrieonians)
15	MF	SEN	Mouhamed Niang
16	FW	SCO	Steven Buchanan (on loan from Alloa Athletic)
17	FW	SCO	Corey O'Donnell
18	FW	NIR	Ally Roy
19	MF	SCO	Charlie Maxwell
20	DF	SCO	Darryl Carrick (on loan from Queen's Park)
21	FW	SCO	Divine Iserhienrhein (co-operation loan with Airdrieonians)
33	DF	SCO	Willie Gibson
—	FW	SCO	Sean McKenzie

=== On loan ===
Note: Flags indicate national team as defined under FIFA eligibility rules; some limited exceptions apply. Players may hold more than one non-FIFA nationality.

No.	Pos.	Nation	Player
—	DF	NGR	Daniel Martins (on loan at Gala Fairydean Rovers)
—	DF	SCO	Brannan McDermott (on loan at Glenafton Athletic)

No.	Pos.	Nation	Player
—	MF	SCO	Cammy Bryson (on loan at Newton Stewart)
—	MF	SCO	Lennon Connolly (on loan at Gala Fairydean Rovers)

== Coaching staff ==
- Manager: Willie Gibson
- Assistant manager: Andy Aitken
- Goalkeeping coach: Greg Fleming
- Kit coordinator: Karen Robertson

== Managers ==
Annan Athletic appointed their first manager in 1975; previously, the team was selected by the club's management committee.

- (Scotland) Sam Wallace (1975–1993)
- (Scotland) Stuart Rome (1993–1994)
- (Scotland) Derek Frye (1994–1997)
- (Scotland) Kevin Hetherington (1997–1998)
- (England) Tony Chilton (1998)
- (Scotland) Davie Irons (1998–2002)
- (Scotland) Billy Sim (2002–2003)
- (Scotland) Harry Cairney (2003–2004)
- (Scotland) Sandy Ross (2004–2005)
- (England) Kenny Brown (2005–2006)
- (Scotland) Harry Cairney (2006–2012)
- (Scotland) Jim Chapman (2013–2017)
- (Republic of Ireland) Peter Murphy (2017–2024)
- (Scotland) Willie Gibson (2024–present)

== Honours ==
- Carlisle and District League
  - Winners: 1952–53
- Cumberland Senior Cup
  - Winners (3): 1952–53, 1968–69, 1971–72
  - Runners up: 1954–55
- East of Scotland Football League
  - Winners (4): 1989–90, 1999–00, 2000–01, 2006–07
  - Runners up (3): 1992–93, 2002–03, 2004–05
- East of Scotland Football League First Division
  - Winners: 1987–88
- East of Scotland League Cup
  - Winners: 1999–00
  - Runners up: 2006–07
- South of Scotland Football League
  - Winners (2): 1983–84, 1986–87
  - Runners up (2): 1982–83, 1984–85
- South of Scotland League Cup
  - Winners (4): 1984–85, 1992–93, 2004–05, 2007–08
- SFA South Region Challenge Cup
  - Winners: 2007–08
- Scottish Qualifying Cup South
  - Winners: 2006–07
