= Mike Korotkich =

Scottish Footballer

Personal information
- Date of birth: 9 December 1956 (age 69)
- Place of birth: Edinburgh, Scotland
- Position: Midfielder

Senior career*
Years	Team	Apps	(Gls)
1981–1982	Hibernian	0	(0)
1982–1986	Meadowbank Thistle	43	(2)
1984–1985	→ St Patrick's Athletic (loan)	16	(1)
1986–1987	Berwick Rangers	6	(1)
1987–1988	Hawick Royal Albert		
- Armadale Thistle
- * Club domestic league appearances and goals

Mike Korotkich (born 26 March 1963) is a Scottish former professional footballer who played as a midfielder for Meadowbank Thistle, St Patrick's Athletic and Berwick Rangers.

== Club career ==
Korotkich started his career with Hibernian but left the club in 1982 without making a single first team appearance.

Following his departure from Easter Road, he signed for Meadowbank Thistle and made his first team debut in a Scottish League Cup tie away against Montrose on 25 August 1982.

In 1984, Korotkich joined St Patrick's Athletic on loan until 1985, when he returned to Scotland and re-signed with Meadowbank Thistle.

After 43 appearances over two spells for Meadowbank Thistle, he left to join Berwick Rangers in 1986.

Korotkich spent one season with The Wee Rangers before signing for Hawick Royal Albert as a player-coach in 1987. Despite a brief return to Meadowbank Thistle on trial later that year, he remained with The Royalists until January 1988 when he left the club for personal reasons.

He later signed for Armadale Thistle and scored a league record 42 goals in the 1988–1989 season.

== Personal life ==
In September 2019, Korotkich was playing golf with former Hearts manager Jim Jefferies when the latter suffered a heart attack. Korotkich's wife was part of the paramedic team that were called for Jeffries.
