= Kevin Hetherington =

Scottish footballer and manager

Kevin Hetherington is a Scottish retired professional footballer who played for Ayr United and hometown club Queen of the South, as a centre-back.

== Playing career ==
After playing for Ayr United Boys Club, Hetherington started his senior career with Ayr United with whom he played in 45 league games in the early Eighties.

In 1985 Hetherington joined Queen of the South where in his two spells he played in 236 league games and was also club captain. His contribution at Palmerston Park in the 1985–86 Second Division promotion success was recognised when Nobby Clark was later interviewed by the club. Hetherington's time at Queens was sandwiched by a spell with Auchinleck Talbot.

After leaving the Doonhamers playing staff for the second time, Hetherington was then player manager at Annan Athletic.

== Honours ==
Queen of the South

- Second Division promotion: 1985–86
