= Billy Bennett (footballer, born 1955) =

Scottish footballer (born 1955)

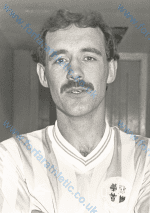

Personal information
- Full name: Billy Bennett
- Date of birth: 5 July 1955 (age 71)
- Place of birth: Newburgh, Scotland
- Position: Defender

Senior career*
Years	Team	Apps	(Gls)
1973–1976	Heart of Midlothian	1	(0)
1976–1978	Berwick Rangers	69	(8)
1978–1989	Forfar Athletic	314	(7)
1989–1990	Arbroath	27	(0)
1990–1993	Cowdenbeath	23	(0)
- * Club domestic league appearances and goals

Billy Bennett (born 5 July 1955) is a Scottish former professional footballer who played as a defender. During a career spanning almost 20 years, he made more than 400 league appearances for a total of five different clubs.

== Career ==
As a youth, Bennett played for Invergowrie Boys' Club before joining Scottish Football League First Division side Heart of Midlothian in 1973. He made his debut for the team in a friendly match away at Queens Park on 29 October 1973, scoring Hearts' fourth goal in a 5–1 victory. It was over a year before Bennett made another senior appearance, when he again scored in a 3–0 Hearts win over Berwick Rangers in the final of the East of Scotland Shield. He made his league debut for Hearts on 16 November 1974 in the 1–3 defeat away at Arbroath.

Bennett left Hearts in the summer of 1976 to sign for Third Division outfit Berwick Rangers. In two seasons with The Borderers, he played 69 league matches and scored 8 goals. At the start of the 1978–79 season, Bennett joined Forfar Athletic. He went on to spend 11 seasons with the team, making a total of 314 league appearances and scoring seven times. He transferred to Arbroath in 1989, and spent one season with the club. Bennett then joined Cowdenbeath, where he played for three years before moving into non-league football with Kelty Hearts in 1993.
