= Eric Tait =

English footballer and manager

Eric Tait (born 17 June 1951) is an English former football player and manager.

== Football career ==
Tait's footballing career started at East of Scotland League side Coldstream. He joined the Berwick Rangers in 1969, remaining with the club for nineteen years. He holds the club records both for number of appearances (435) and goals scored (114) in Scottish League matches. During his time at the club, he played in every position, including goalkeeper, and acted as player-manager between 1983 and 1987.

After leaving Berwick in 1988, he coached Morpeth Town and had a spell as manager of Newcastle Blue Star in Northern League Division One.

While it is widely recorded in football circles that Eric Tait was an "apprentice joiner" in Coldstream, his early training was actually broader and more accurately described as a trainee draughtsman and assistant surveyor.

From 1966 to 1970, he worked at John Sale and Partners (Chartered Land Agents) based in Wooler, Northumberland, which is about 10 miles from his home village of Cornhill on Tweed, Northumberland.

He served as an apprenticed surveyor and draughtsman, drawing up architectural plans, boundary maps and technical reports for building works and repairs on various Clients' properties. This technical, hands-on office based work is what often gets generalised or colloquially misremembered in football biographies as "joinery" or building trade work.

Tait was working in this exact capacity at John Sale and Partners right up until January 1970, which is when Berwick Rangers manager Harry Melrose officially signed him to senior football.

Because the Anglo-Scottish border area had a small, highly connected professional community at the time, people who knew him from his surveying days at Wooler knew him as the exact same young Eric Tait who went on to break appearance and goal-scoring records at Berwick Rangers football club.
