= Mafeking Park =

Park which after road improvements is a roundabout

Coordinates: 55°09′48″N 1°41′06″W

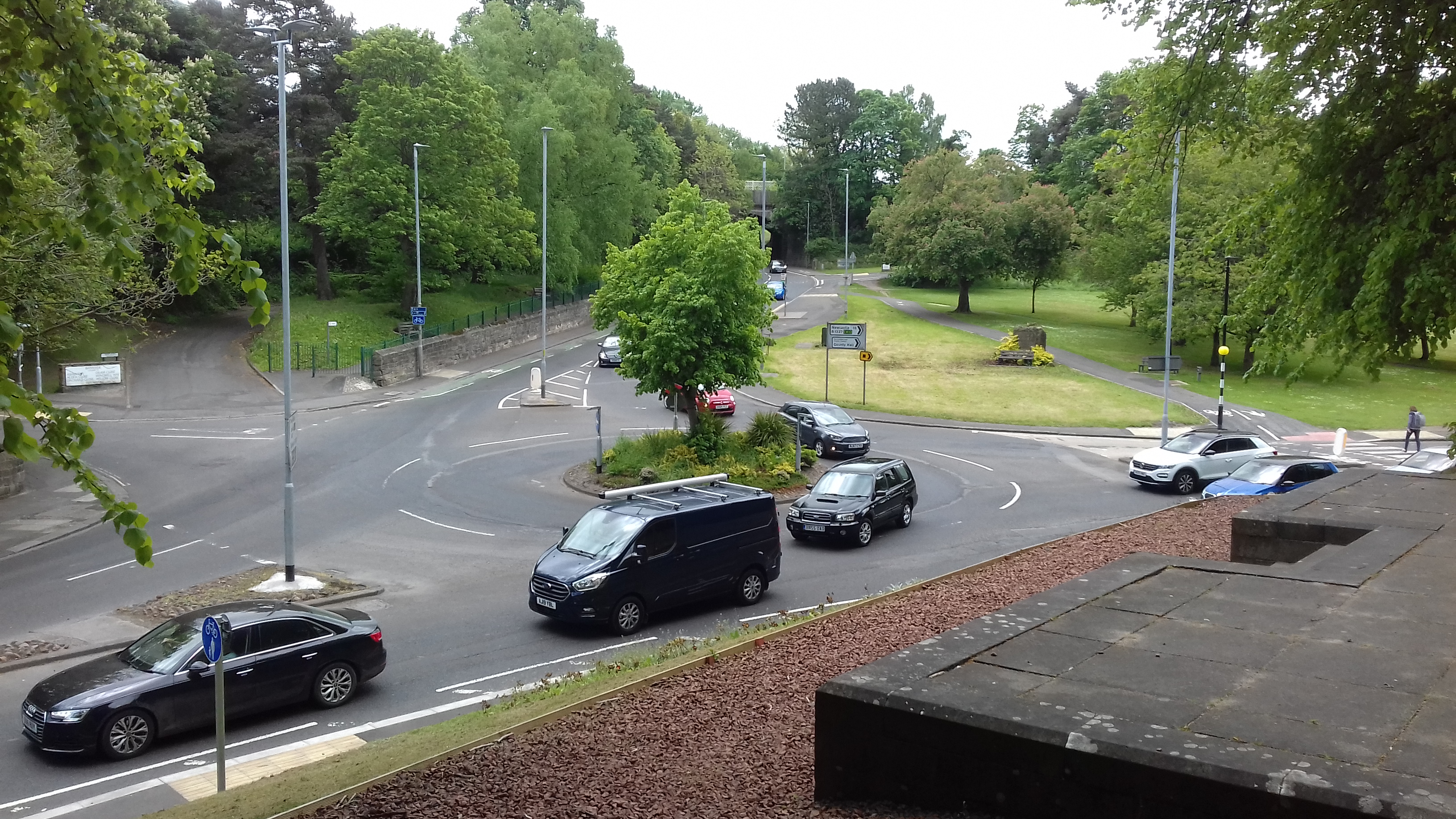
Mafeking Park

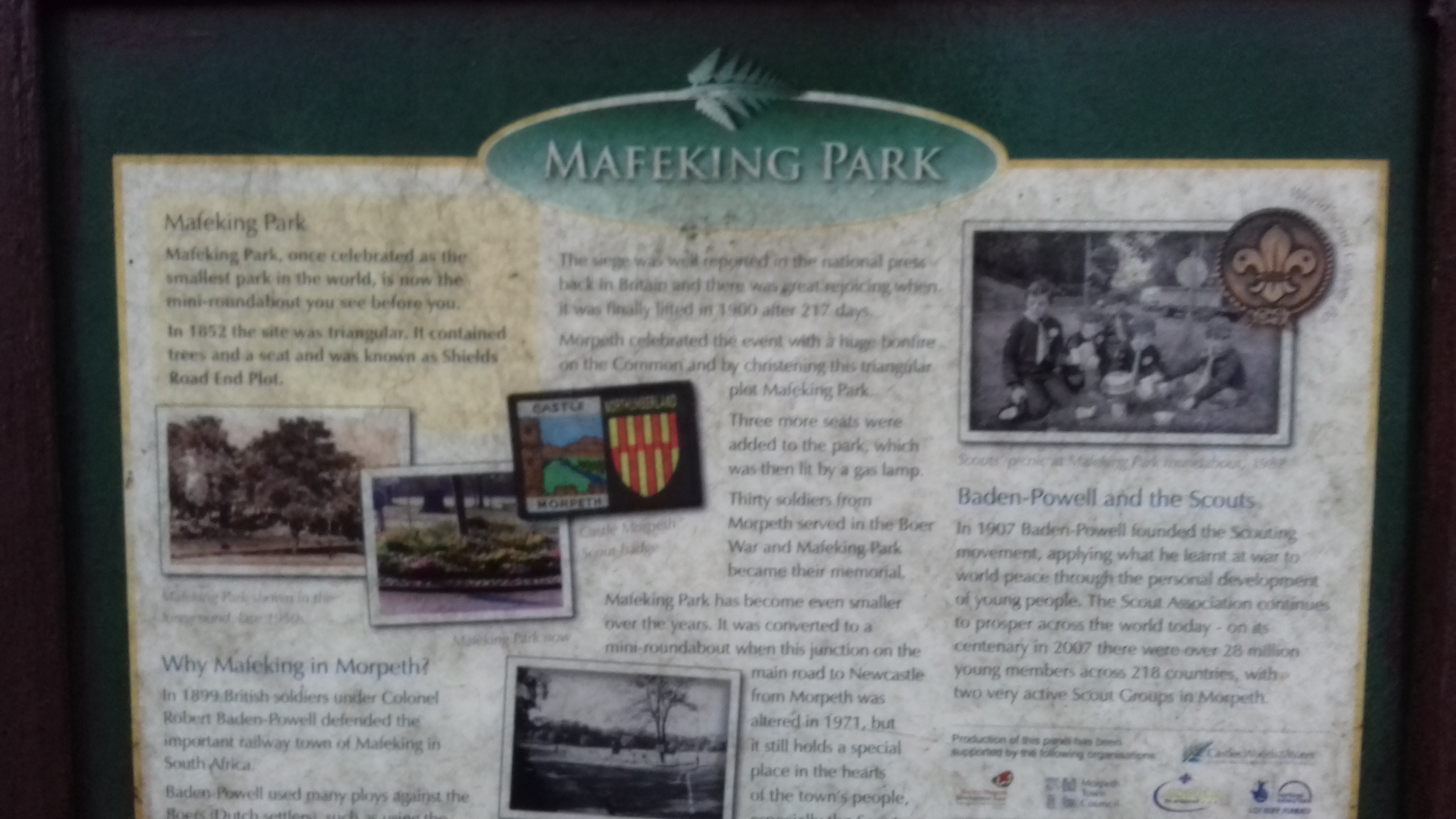
An information sign located outside the park, which faces the park

Mafeking Park is a public park in Morpeth, Northumberland, England, at the bottom of Station Bank. It was unsuccessfully put forward by locals to be listed as the smallest park in the world in the Guinness Book of Records. The park was originally a triangle of land bounded by roads but after road improvements is now a small roundabout. Recently, the area around the roundabout has been subject to improvements, including the installation of off- and on-road cycle routes.
