= Peter Shields (footballer) =

Scottish footballer

Personal information
- Full name: Peter Shields
- Date of birth: 14 August 1960 (age 66)
- Place of birth: Baillieston, Scotland
- Position: Full back

Youth career
- Celtic Boys Club

Senior career*
Years	Team	Apps	(Gls)
1977–1980	Ipswich Town	0	(0)
1980–1984	Hearts	95	(1)
1984–1985	Partick Thistle	19	(0)
1985–1986	Cowdenbeath	36	(0)
Total		150	(1)
- * Club domestic league appearances and goals

Peter Shields (born 14 August 1960) is a Scottish former footballer who played for Ipswich Town, Hearts, Partick Thistle and Cowdenbeath.
