= Frank Liddell (footballer) =

Scottish footballer

Personal information
- Date of birth: 10 July 1953 (age 73)
- Place of birth: Stirling, Scotland
- Height: 5 ft 10 in (1.78 m)
- Position: Centre-back

Senior career*
Years	Team	Apps	(Gls)
–1975	Dunipace		
1975–1978	Alloa Athletic	60	(5)
1978–1981	Heart of Midlothian	92	(4)
1982–1984	Brisbane City		
1984–1985	Dunfermline Athletic	3	(1)
1984–1985	Stenhousemuir	7	(0)
1985–1986	St Johnstone	24	(0)
1986–19??	Brisbane City		
Total		186	(10)
- * Club domestic league appearances and goals

Frank Liddell (born 10 July 1953) is a Scottish former professional footballer who played as a centre-back.

== Early life ==
Liddell was born in Stirling, and grew up in the village of Fallin.

== Career ==
After playing for Dunipace, he joined Alloa Athletic in 1975, where he played part time whilst working as a miner, and was part of the team that finished second in the 1976–77 Scottish Second Division and won promotion to the Scottish First Division. Having recently taken up a job as an inspector at an aluminium plant, he instead became a full-time footballer by signing for Scottish Premier Division side Heart of Midlothian for a fee of £15,000. After they were relegated in the 1978–79 season to the Scottish First Division, he scored their title-winning goal in the 1979–80 season against Airdrieonians on 30 April 1980 as they were promoted back to the first tier.

He left to join Brisbane City in the 1981–82 season, before returning to Scotland and having spells at Dunfermline Athletic, Stenhousemuir, St Johnstone. He returned to Brisbane City in 1986, where he would finish his career.

== Personal life ==
Since retiring from professional football, Liddell has remained in Brisbane and has become a financial advisor.
