= Mike Larnach =

Scottish footballer (1952–2026)

Personal information
- Full name: Michael David Larnach
- Date of birth: 9 November 1952
- Place of birth: Lybster, Scotland
- Date of death: 10 July 2026 (aged 73)
- Height: 5 ft 9 in (1.75 m)
- Position: Forward

Youth career
- Campsie Black Watch

Senior career*
Years	Team	Apps	(Gls)
1971–1972	East Stirlingshire (trialist)	2	(0)
1972–1977	Clydebank	167	(63)
1977–1978	Newcastle United	13	(0)
1978–1981	Motherwell	58	(7)
1981–1983	Ayr United	49	(8)
1983–1984	Stenhousemuir	12	(2)
1984–1986	Clydebank	86	(20)
Total		387	(100)
- * Club domestic league appearances and goals

Michael David Larnach (9 November 1952 – 10 July 2026) was a Scottish footballer, who played as a forward for East Stirlingshire, Clydebank, Newcastle United, Motherwell, Ayr United and Stenhousemuir. He died on 10 July 2026, at the age of 73.
