= Gordon Cramond =

Scottish footballer

Personal information
- Date of birth: 19 March 1949
- Place of birth: Aberdeen, Scotland
- Date of death: 1989 (aged 39–40)
- Position: Midfielder

Senior career*
Years	Team	Apps	(Gls)
1967–1969	Dundee	0	(0)
1969–1974	Montrose	136	(32)
1974–1976	St Johnstone	85	(7)
1976–1980	Ayr United	129	(14)
1980–1982	Kilmarnock	33	(3)
1982–1983	Brechin City	1	(0)

International career
1978	Scottish League XI	1	(0)
- * Club domestic league appearances and goals

Gordon Cramond (19 March 1949 – 1989) was a Scottish professional footballer who played as a midfielder.

== Career ==
Born in Aberdeen, Cramond played for Dundee, Montrose, St Johnstone, Ayr United, Kilmarnock, and Brechin City.

He moved from Montrose, where he was Player of the Year in 1971, to St Johnstone in 1974 for a fee of £10,000.
