= Robert Gray (footballer, born 1953) =

Scottish footballer

Personal information
- Date of birth: 8 June 1953 (age 73)
- Place of birth: Glasgow, Scotland
- Position: Midfielder

Youth career
- Nottingham Forest

Senior career*
Years	Team	Apps	(Gls)
1972–1973	Workington	1	(0)
1973	Airdrie	0	(0)
1973–1974	Blantyre Victoria		
1974–1982	Stirling Albion	166	(25)
1982	Alloa Athletic	3	(0)
1982–1983	Albion Rovers	20	(2)
- Blantyre Victoria
Total		190	(28)
- * Club domestic league appearances and goals

Robert Gray (born 8 June 1953) is a Scottish former professional footballer who played for Nottingham Forest, Workington, Airdrie, Blantyre Victoria, Stirling Albion, Alloa Athletic and Albion Rovers, as a midfielder.
