= Ian Clinging =

Scottish footballer

Personal information
- Date of birth: 12 June 1958 (age 68)
- Place of birth: Motherwell, Scotland
- Height: 1.73 m (5 ft 8 in)
- Position: Midfielder

Senior career*
Years	Team	Apps	(Gls)
1977–1983	Motherwell	113	(21)
1983	→ Kilmarnock (loan)	3	(0)
1983–1989	Morton	181	(28)
1989–1991	Forfar Athletic	37	(7)
1991–1992	Berwick Rangers	2	(0)
Total		336	(56)
- * Club domestic league appearances and goals

Ian Clinging (born 12 June 1958) is a Scottish former professional footballer who played as a midfielder. Born in Motherwell, he played over 300 matches in the Scottish Football League for four clubs.
