= Tommy Yule =

Scottish footballer (born 1953)

Personal information
- Date of birth: 27 January 1953 (age 73)
- Place of birth: Glasgow, Scotland
- Position: Winger

Senior career*
Years	Team	Apps	(Gls)
- Beith
1973–1983	Arbroath	261	(59)
1983–1985	Airdrie	26	(3)
- Beith
Total		287	(62)
- * Club domestic league appearances and goals

Tommy Yule (born 27 January 1953) is a Scottish former professional footballer who played as a winger.

== Career ==
Born in Glasgow, Yule played for Beith, Arbroath and Airdrie.
