= Doug Somner =

Scottish footballer

Personal information
- Full name: Douglas McKenzie Somner
- Date of birth: 4 July 1951 (age 75)
- Place of birth: Edinburgh, Scotland
- Position: Forward

Youth career
- East Kilbride Thistle

Senior career*
Years	Team	Apps	(Gls)
1971–1974	Falkirk	45	(12)
1974–1975	Ayr United	5	(1)
1974–1979	Partick Thistle	144	(61)
1979–1983	St Mirren	99	(45)
1983–1984	Hamilton Academical	36	(9)
1984–1986	Montrose	66	(15)

International career
1978–1980	Scottish Football League XI	3	(2)
- * Club domestic league appearances and goals

Douglas McKenzie Somner (born 4 July 1951 in Edinburgh) is a Scottish former footballer, who played for clubs including Partick Thistle and St Mirren. He was the first player ever to score for St Mirren in European competition. He finished as the top scorer in the Scottish Football League Premier Division in the 1979–80 season.
