= Tommy Walker (footballer, born March 1952) =

Scottish footballer

Personal information
- Date of birth: 15 March 1952 (age 74)
- Place of birth: Arbroath, Scotland
- Position: Midfielder

Youth career
- Arbroath Lads Club

Senior career*
Years	Team	Apps	(Gls)
1969–1972	Arbroath	74	(17)
1972–1982	Airdrieonians	299	(27)
1973–1974	→ Arbroath (loan)	22	(0)
1982	Dumbarton		
1982–1984	Stirling Albion	56	(1)
Total		377	(28)
- * Club domestic league appearances and goals

Tommy Walker (born 15 March 1952) is a Scottish former footballer who played as a midfielder for Airdrieonians, Arbroath, Dumbarton and Stirling Albion.
