= Brian McLaughlin (footballer, born 1954) =

Scottish footballer (1954–2009)

Personal information
- Date of birth: 7 October 1954
- Place of birth: Grangemouth, Scotland
- Date of death: 13 August 2009 (aged 54)
- Place of death: Falkirk, Scotland
- Position: Winger

Senior career*
Years	Team	Apps	(Gls)
1971–1977	Celtic	7	(1)
1975–1976	→ Finn Harps (loan)	9	(5)
1977–1979	Ayr United	68	(25)
1979–1982	Motherwell	116	(37)
1982–1983	Hamilton Academical	15	(8)
1983–1985	Falkirk	12	(0)
1985–1986	West Adelaide		
1986–1987	Ayr United	18	(1)
Total		245	(77)
- * Club domestic league appearances and goals

Brian McLaughlin (7 October 1954 – 13 August 2009) was a Scottish footballer who signed for Celtic from Linlithgow Rose before going on to play for Ayr United, Motherwell, Hamilton Academical and Falkirk. He signed for Hamilton Academical in January 1983 for a transfer fee of around £15,000 after having been made available for sale by his manager Jock Wallace. After his playing career ended, he was a member of St Mirren's coaching staff.

On 13 August 2009, McLaughlin was found dead in the Union Canal near Falkirk. Police said there did not appear to be any suspicious circumstances, and ruled his death accidental.
