= Jim Cruickshank =

Scottish footballer

Personal information
- Full name: James Fergus Cruickshank
- Date of birth: 13 April 1941
- Place of birth: Glasgow, Scotland
- Date of death: 18 November 2010 (aged 69)
- Place of death: Edinburgh, Scotland
- Position: Goalkeeper

Senior career*
Years	Team	Apps	(Gls)
1958–1960	Queen's Park	30	(0)
1960–1977	Heart of Midlothian	394	(0)
1977–1978	Dumbarton	3	(0)

International career
1960–1964	Scotland U23	3	(0)
1964	SFL trial v SFA	1	(0)
1964–1975	Scotland	9	(0)
1964–1970	Scottish League XI	3	(0)
- * Club domestic league appearances and goals

James Fergus Cruickshank (13 April 1941 – 18 November 2010) was a Scottish footballer who played as a goalkeeper. He played for Heart of Midlothian through most of the 1960s and 1970s, making nearly 400 league appearances. He had brief spells with Queen's Park at the start of his career and spent his final season with Dumbarton. Cruickshank also represented Scotland and the Scottish League.

== Life and career ==
Cruickshank appeared 30 times in league games for the Hampden Park football club Queen's Park between 1958 and 1960. He joined Hearts in 1960 and left the club in 1977 after 17 years of service. He made 528 appearances for the first team and turned out 394 times in league matches. After leaving Hearts he joined Dumbarton, where he featured in three league matches before retiring from the game.

He made nine appearances for the Scotland national football team, and was on the losing side only once. Cruickshank made three appearances during a 1967 overseas tour that the Scottish Football Association decided in October 2021 to reclassify as full internationals, which increased his cap tally from six to nine.

== Personal life and death ==
After his retirement from football, Cruickshank worked for the NHS in Edinburgh, in addition to work as a publican and shopkeeper.

Cruickshank died on 18 November 2010, aged 69. Former Hearts players Jim Jefferies and Craig Gordon paid tribute to Cruickshank, describing him as a "top goalie" and "undoubtedly one of the best" to play for Hearts.

On 20 November 2010, Hearts paid tribute to Cruickshank by holding a one-minute silence before their game against Hamilton Academical. Marian Kello, then first choice goalkeeper for Hearts, also tied a yellow goalkeeper's jersey with Cruickshank's name and number on the back to his net. During the game, Kello saved a Hamilton penalty kick. Hearts manager Jim Jefferies said after the game that "Jim Cruickshank was a great penalty saver. How fitting is it that Marian comes out with the jersey and makes a fantastic save from a penalty on the day we paid our respects to him".
