= Malcolm Robertson (footballer) =

Scottish footballer

Personal information
- Full name: Malcolm Robertson
- Date of birth: 7 July 1951
- Place of birth: Edinburgh, Scotland
- Date of death: 18 August 2010 (aged 59)
- Position: Left winger

Senior career*
Years	Team	Apps	(Gls)
1969–1970	Penicuik Athletic		
1971–1975	Raith Rovers	140	(53)
1975–1977	Ayr United	40	(7)
1977–1981	Heart of Midlothian	98	(14)
1981	Toronto Blizzard	19	(2)
1981–1982	Dundee United	2	(0)
1982–1983	Hibernian	5	(0)
- Hamrun Spartans
Total		285	(74)
- * Club domestic league appearances and goals

Malcolm Robertson (7 July 1951 – 18 August 2010) was a Scottish footballer who played as a left winger. He made his mark playing for Penicuik Athletic when he appeared in the 1970 Scottish Junior Cup Final. He then moved to Raith Rovers, scoring 53 goals in 140 league appearances for the Kirkcaldy side.

Robertson went on to play for Ayr United, before Hearts signed him for a £25,000 fee in 1977. Hearts were battling with Ayr against relegation, but Robertson was sent off in a decisive match between the two teams. Hearts were a yo-yo club in the late 1970s and early 1980s; Robertson helped the club gain promotion back to the Premier Division in 1978 and 1980.

Robertson left Hearts in 1981 to play in Canada for Toronto Blizzard. He briefly returned to Scotland, playing for Dundee United and Hibernian. This preceded a final playing spell with Maltese side Hamrun Spartans. Robertson played just under 300 league matches during his twelve-year career.

His son, Sandy Robertson, played for Rangers in the 1990s.
