= Sandy Burrell =

Scottish footballer

Personal information
- Date of birth: 25 May 1955 (age 71)
- Place of birth: Edinburgh, Scotland
- Position: Left back

Youth career
- –1971: Royston Boys Club
- 1971–1974: Heart of Midlothian

Senior career*
Years	Team	Apps	(Gls)
1974–1977	Heart of Midlothian	16	(0)
1977–1982	Falkirk	120	(1)
1982–1983	Meadowbank Thistle	28	(0)
- Newtongrange Star
Total		164	(1)
- * Club domestic league appearances and goals

Sandy Burrell (born 25 May 1955) is a Scottish former professional footballer who played as a defender for Heart of Midlothian ("Hearts"), Falkirk and Meadowbank Thistle. Burrell played for Hearts in the 1976 Scottish Cup Final, which they lost 3–1 to Rangers.
