= 1979–80 Scottish First Division =

Scottish First Division
- Season: 1979–80
- Champions: Heart of Midlothian
- Promoted: Heart of Midlothian; Airdrieonians
- Relegated: Arbroath; Clyde
- Matches played: 273
- Goals scored: 781 (2.86 per match)
- Top goalscorer: John Brogan, Sandy Clark (22)
- Biggest home win: Berwick Rangers 7–2 Arbroath, 29.09.1979
- Biggest away win: Ayr United 0–5 Motherwell, 23.02.1980

The 1979–80 Scottish First Division season was won by Heart of Midlothian, who were promoted along with Airdrieonians to the Premier Division. Arbroath and Clyde were relegated to the Second Division.

== League table ==
Pos	Team	Pld	W	D	L	GF	GA	GD	Pts	Promotion or relegation
1	Heart of Midlothian (C, P)	39	20	13	6	58	39	+19	53	Promotion to the Premier Division
2	Airdrieonians (P)	39	21	9	9	78	47	+31	51	Promotion to the Premier Division
3	Ayr United	39	16	12	11	64	51	+13	44	
4	Dumbarton	39	19	6	14	59	51	+8	44	
5	Raith Rovers	39	14	15	10	54	46	+8	43	
6	Motherwell	39	16	11	12	59	48	+11	43	
7	Hamilton Academical	39	15	10	14	60	59	+1	40	
8	Stirling Albion	39	13	13	13	40	40	0	39	
9	Clydebank	39	14	8	17	58	57	+1	36	
10	Dunfermline Athletic	39	11	13	15	39	57	−18	35	
11	St Johnstone	39	12	10	17	57	74	−17	34	
12	Berwick Rangers	39	8	15	16	57	64	−7	31	
13	Arbroath (R)	39	9	10	20	50	79	−29	28	Relegation to the Second Division
14	Clyde (R)	39	6	13	20	43	69	−26	25	Relegation to the Second Division

Source: RSSSF and statto
Rules for classification: 1) points; 2) goal difference; 3) number of goals scored.
(C) Champions; (P) Promoted; (R) Relegated
