= 1975–76 Scottish Premier Division =

70th season of top-tier football league in Scotland

Scottish Premier Division
- Season: 1975–76
- Champions: Rangers; 1st Premier Division title 36th Scottish title
- Relegated: Dundee; St Johnstone
- European Cup: Rangers
- UEFA Cup: Celtic; Hibernian
- Cup Winners' Cup: Heart of Midlothian
- Matches: 180
- Goals: 501 (2.78 per match)
- Top goalscorer: Kenny Dalglish (24)
- Biggest home win: Hibernian 5–0 St Johnstone
- Biggest away win: Ayr United 2–7 Celtic

The 1975–76 Scottish Premier Division season was won by Rangers, six points ahead of Celtic. Dundee and St Johnstone were relegated. This was the first season of the Premier Division, the highest level of Scottish football. The Scottish First Division, previously the top flight of Scottish football became the second flight.

In an attempt to bring instant drama to the new format, the league made the unusual scheduling decision to hold an Old Firm match and an Edinburgh Derby on the opening weekend.

== Table ==
Pos	Team	Pld	W	D	L	GF	GA	GD	Pts	Qualification or relegation
1	Rangers (C)	36	23	8	5	60	24	+36	54	Qualification for the European Cup first round
2	Celtic	36	21	6	9	71	42	+29	48	Qualification for the UEFA Cup first round
3	Hibernian	36	18	7	11	55	43	+12	43	Qualification for the UEFA Cup first round
4	Motherwell	36	16	8	12	57	49	+8	40	
5	Heart of Midlothian	36	13	9	14	39	45	−6	35	Qualification for the Cup Winners' Cup first round
6	Ayr United	36	14	5	17	46	59	−13	33	
7	Aberdeen	36	11	10	15	49	50	−1	32	
8	Dundee United	36	12	8	16	46	48	−2	32	
9	Dundee (R)	36	11	10	15	49	62	−13	32	Relegation to the 1976–77 Scottish First Division
10	St Johnstone (R)	36	3	5	28	29	79	−50	11	Relegation to the 1976–77 Scottish First Division

Source: Statto
Rules for classification: 1) points; 2) goal difference; 3) number of goals scored.
(C) Champions; (R) Relegated

== Results ==
=== Matches 1–18 ===
During matches 1–18 each team plays every other team twice (home and away).

Home \ Away	ABE	AYR	CEL	DND	DNU	HOM	HIB	MOT	RAN	STJ
Aberdeen		3–1	1–2	2–0	1–3	0–0	2–2	2–2	1–0	2–0
Ayr United	1–0		2–7	2–1	2–2	1–1	1–3	2–0	3–0	1–0
Celtic	0–2	3–1		4–0	2–1	3–1	1–1	0–2	1–1	3–2
Dundee	3–2	2–2	1–0		0–0	2–3	2–0	3–6	0–0	4–3
Dundee United	1–2	3–2	1–3	1–2		0–1	1–0	1–1	0–0	3–1
Heart of Midlothian	2–2	2–1	0–1	1–1	1–0		1–1	3–3	0–2	2–0
Hibernian	3–1	1–0	1–3	1–1	1–1	1–0		1–0	2–1	4–2
Motherwell	3–0	1–1	1–1	3–2	2–1	1–1	2–1		2–1	2–1
Rangers	1–0	3–0	2–1	2–1	4–1	1–2	1–1	3–2		2–0
St Johnstone	1–1	0–1	1–2	1–3	1–0	0–1	3–4	2–1	1–5	

Legend: Blue = home team win; Yellow = draw; Red = away team win.

==== Matches 19–36 ====
Home \ Away	ABE	AYR	CEL	DND	DNU	HOM	HIB	MOT	RAN	STJ
Aberdeen		2–1	0–1	0–1	5–3	0–3	3–0	0–0	0–0	3–0
Ayr United	1–1		3–5	3–1	1–0	0–1	2–0	2–1	0–1	2–0
Celtic	1–1	1–2		3–3	2–1	2–0	4–0	4–0	0–0	1–0
Dundee	1–3	1–2	0–1		2–1	4–1	1–1	1–0	1–1	3–0
Dundee United	1–0	5–0	3–2	1–0		2–0	2–0	1–4	0–1	1–1
Heart of Midlothian	3–3	1–0	1–0	3–0	0–1		0–1	1–2	1–2	1–0
Hibernian	3–2	3–0	2–0	4–0	0–1	3–0		2–0	0–3	5–0
Motherwell	2–1	1–0	1–3	1–1	3–2	2–0	0–1		0–1	2–0
Rangers	2–1	2–1	1–0	3–0	0–0	3–1	2–0	2–1		4–0
St Johnstone	2–0	1–2	3–4	1–1	1–1	0–0	0–2	1–3	0–3	

Legend: Blue = home team win; Yellow = draw; Red = away team win.

== Awards ==
Award	Winner	Club
SFWA Footballer of the Year	(Scotland) John Greig	Rangers
