= Derek Frye =

Scottish footballer

Personal information
- Full name: James Frederick Frye
- Date of birth: 2 February 1956 (age 70)
- Place of birth: Irvine, Scotland
- Position: Striker

Youth career
- Darvel

Senior career*
Years	Team	Apps	(Gls)
1972–1975	Kilmarnock	0	(0)
1975–1976	Queen of the South	4	(0)
1976–1978	Stranraer	78	(51)
1978–1979	Dundee United	9	(1)
1979–1983	Ayr United	132	(46)
1983–1986	Clyde	97	(48)
1986–1987	Airdrieonians	21	(2)
1987–1988	Queen of the South	29	(7)
1988–1989	Stranraer	20	(5)
- Ardrossan Winton Rovers
1992–1993	Queen of the South	1	(0)
Total		391	(160)

Managerial career
- 1992–1993: Queen of the South
- 1994–1997: Annan Athletic
- Tarff Rovers
- 2005–2011: Ardrossan Winton Rovers
- 2011–2013: Kirkintilloch Rob Roy (co-manager)
- 2013–2014: Ardrossan Winton Rovers
- 2014–2017: Saltcoats Victoria
- * Club domestic league appearances and goals

James Frederick Frye (born 2 February 1956) is a Scottish former footballer who played as a striker for several clubs in the Scottish Football League.

== Career ==
Frye began his professional career with Kilmarnock but made no senior appearances and joined Queen of the South in 1975. Featuring only four times, Frye left after a season to join Stranraer, where he became the club's highest season goalscorer in his two years there. A move to Premier Division side Dundee United followed, but Frye dropped back to lower league football within a year, joining Ayr United.

Frye made over 130 league appearances for Ayr and went on to make nearly 100 for Clyde, where he scored nearly fifty goals. Single-season spells played out Frye's career in the late 1980s, with time at Airdrieonians, and returns to Queen of the South and Stranraer. Frye went back briefly to Queen of the South in the early 1990s, playing once and serving as player-manager.

Frye spent three years managing Annan Athletic in the mid-1990s and was assistant to Rowan Alexander at Gretna until 2004. He was appointed manager of Ardrossan Winton Rovers in June 2005, leading the club to the Ayrshire League title in 2010–11.

In December 2011, Frye left Winton to become co-manager with former Ayr teammate Jimmy Lindsay at Kirkintilloch Rob Roy. It was announced in March 2013 that Frye would return to Winton as manager at the end of the season, but he resigned in April 2014.

Frye's most recent managed Saltcoats Victoria from November 2014 until February 2017.
