= Roy Kay =

Scottish footballer

Personal information
- Full name: Robert Kay
- Date of birth: 24 October 1949 (age 77)
- Place of birth: Edinburgh, Scotland
- Position: Full back

Senior career*
Years	Team	Apps	(Gls)
1968–1977	Heart of Midlothian	143	(1)
1977–1978	Celtic	5	(0)
1978–1982	York City	160	(8)
1982–?	Northallerton Town	?	(?)
- * Club domestic league appearances and goals

Robert "Roy" Kay (born 24 October 1949) is a Scottish former footballer, who played as a defender.

Kay started his professional career with Heart of Midlothian and featured in a Scottish Cup Final and the European Cup Winners' Cup, making over 140 league appearances before being released. He joined Scottish champions Celtic and made five league appearances before signing for York City, where he made over 180 appearances.

== Career ==
Kay was born on 24 October 1949 in Edinburgh, Scotland and was educated at Gracemount Secondary School. He played for Crossroads United in Scottish junior football before starting his professional footballing career after joining Heart of Midlothian in January 1968. He made his debut during the 1970–71 season and featured for Hearts in the 1976 Scottish Cup Final, where they were defeated 3–1 by Rangers, as well as playing in the European Cup Winners' Cup. He was released by Hearts following their relegation from the Scottish Premier Division at the end of the 1976–77 season, after making 193 appearances, and was signed by champions Celtic in July 1977 as cover for Danny McGrain. He played for Celtic during the 1977–78 season and made five league appearances, while also appearing in the European Cup. He was signed by Fourth Division side York City in July 1978 and was appointed as captain by manager Charlie Wright. He went on to make 183 appearances for York in all competitions and was released in May 1982 and went on to play for non-League side Northallerton Town.

== Style of play ==
He was able to show composure while under pressure and impressed with his positional play. He was a versatile player, being able to play as a full back on either flank and also being able to fill in at central defence and in midfield.
