= 1975–76 Scottish Cup =

Tournament details
- Country: Scotland

Final positions
- Champions: Rangers
- Runners-up: Heart of Midlothian

The 1975–76 Scottish Cup was the 91st staging of Scotland's most prestigious football knockout competition. The Cup was won by Rangers who defeated Heart of Midlothian in the final.

== First round ==
Home team	Score	Away team
Albion Rovers	0 – 0	Hawick Royal Albert
Brechin City	1 – 1	Berwick Rangers
East Stirlingshire	0 – 5	Alloa Athletic
Elgin City	0 – 1	Forres Mechanics
Peterhead	0 – 2	Raith Rovers
Stranraer	1 – 0	Queen's Park

=== Replays ===
Home team	Score	Away team
Hawick Royal Albert	0 – 3	Albion Rovers
Berwick Rangers	3 – 3	Brechin City

==== Second Replays ====
Home team	Score	Away team
Berwick Rangers	0 – 1	Brechin City

== Second round ==
Home team	Score	Away team
Albion Rovers	1 – 1	Glasgow University
Cowdenbeath	2 – 0	Selkirk
Forfar Athletic	2 – 1	Meadowbank Thistle
Forres Mechanics	1 – 2	Alloa Athletic
Raith Rovers	3 – 1	Clydebank
Stenhousemuir	2 – 2	Brechin City
Stirling Albion	4 – 0	Civil Service Strollers
Stranraer	2 – 3	Keith

=== Replays ===
Home team	Score	Away team
Brechin City	0 – 1	Stenhousemuir
Glasgow University	0 – 1	Albion Rovers

== Third round ==
Home team	Score	Away team
Albion Rovers	1 – 2	Partick Thistle
Alloa Athletic	0 – 4	Aberdeen
Ayr United	4 – 2	Airdrieonians
Cowdenbeath	3 – 0	St Mirren
Dumbarton	2 – 0	Keith
Dundee	1 – 2	Falkirk
Dundee United	4 – 0	Hamilton Academical
Hearts	2 – 2	Clyde
Hibernian	3 – 2	Dunfermline Athletic
Morton	1 – 3	Montrose
Motherwell	3 – 2	Celtic
Queen of the South	3 – 2	St Johnstone
Raith Rovers	1 – 0	Arbroath
Rangers	3 – 0	East Fife
Stenhousemuir	1 – 1	Kilmarnock
Stirling Albion	2 – 1	Forfar Athletic

=== Replays ===
Home team	Score	Away team
Clyde	0 – 1	Hearts
Kilmarnock	1 – 0	Stenhousemuir

== Fourth round ==
Home team	Score	Away team
Ayr United	2 – 2	Queen of the South
Cowdenbeath	0 – 2	Motherwell
Hearts	3 – 0	Stirling Albion
Hibernian	1 – 1	Dundee United
Kilmarnock	3 – 1	Falkirk
Montrose	2 – 1	Raith Rovers
Partick Thistle	0 – 0	Dumbarton
Rangers	4 – 1	Aberdeen

=== Replays ===
Home team	Score	Away team
Dumbarton	1 – 0	Partick Thistle
Dundee United	0 – 2	Hibernian
Queen of the South	5 – 4	Ayr United

== Quarter-finals ==
Home team	Score	Away team
Dumbarton	2 – 1	Kilmarnock
Montrose	2 – 2	Hearts
Motherwell	2 – 2	Hibernian
Queen of the South	0 – 5	Rangers

=== Replays ===
Home team	Score	Away team
Hibernian	1 – 1	Motherwell
Hearts	2 – 2	Montrose

==== Second Replays ====
Home team	Score	Away team
Hibernian	1 – 2	Motherwell
Hearts	2 – 1	Montrose

== Semi-finals ==
31 March 1976

Motherwell	2–3	Rangers

Attendance: 50,000
Referee: John Gordon

3 April 1976

Dumbarton	0–0	Hearts

Hampden Park, Glasgow
Attendance: 16,087
Referee: Ian Foote

=== Replays ===
14 April 1976

Dumbarton	0–3	Hearts

Hampden Park, Glasgow
Attendance: 11,273
Referee: Ian Foote

== Final ==
1 May 1976

Rangers	3–1	Hearts
Derek Johnstone (2); Alex MacDonald		Graham Shaw

Hampden Park, Glasgow
Attendance: 85,354
Referee: Bobby Davidson

== See also ==
- 1975–76 in Scottish football
- 1975–76 Scottish League Cup
