= John Gallacher (footballer, born 1951) =

Scottish footballer

Personal information
- Date of birth: 12 December 1951 (age 74)
- Place of birth: Falkirk, Scotland
- Position: Central defender

Senior career*
Years	Team	Apps	(Gls)
1969–1970	Queen's Park	8	(0)
1970–1978	Heart of Midlothian	73	(4)
1978–1982	Dumbarton	131	(2)
Total		212	(5)
- * Club domestic league appearances and goals

John Gallacher (born 12 December 1951) is a Scottish former footballer, who played for Queen's Park, Heart of Midlothian ("Hearts") and Dumbarton in the Scottish Football League. Gallacher was part of the Hearts team in the 1976 Scottish Cup Final, which they lost 3–1 to Rangers.
