= Willie McGuire =

Scottish footballer

Personal information
- Full name: William Martin McGuire
- Date of birth: 24 January 1957 (age 69)
- Place of birth: Bellshill, Scotland
- Positions: Midfielder; forward

Youth career
- Petershill

Senior career*
Years	Team	Apps	(Gls)
1975–1986	Airdrieonians	233	(44)
1985–1987	Falkirk	43	(7)
1987–1990	Partick Thistle	52	(11)
1990–1992	Dumbarton	13	(1)
- * Club domestic league appearances and goals

William Martin McGuire (born 24 January 1957) was a Scottish footballer who played for Airdrie, Falkirk, Partick Thistle and Dumbarton. He is currently a club ambassador at Airdrieonians.
