= 1975–76 Scottish League Cup =

Tournament details
- Country: Scotland

Final positions
- Champions: Rangers
- Runners-up: Celtic

The 1975–76 Scottish League Cup was the thirtieth season of Scotland's second football knockout competition. The competition was won by Rangers, who defeated Celtic in the Final.

== First round ==
=== Group 1 ===
Team	Pld	W	D	L	GF	GA	GD	Pts
Rangers	6	4	2	0	18	5	+13	10
Motherwell	6	3	2	1	10	6	+4	8
Airdrieonians	6	2	0	4	7	14	−7	4
Clyde	6	1	0	5	4	14	−10	2

Home team	Score	Away team	Date
Motherwell	2–0	Clyde	9 August 1975
Rangers	6–1	Airdrieonians	9 August 1975
Airdrieonians	2–1	Motherwell	13 August 1975
Clyde	0–1	Rangers	13 August 1975
Airdrieonians	2–1	Clyde	16 August 1975
Rangers	1–1	Motherwell	16 August 1975
Motherwell	2–0	Airdrieonians	20 August 1975
Rangers	6–0	Clyde	20 August 1975
Clyde	2–1	Airdrieonians	23 August 1975
Motherwell	2–2	Rangers	23 August 1975
Airdrieonians	1–2	Rangers	27 August 1975
Clyde	1–2	Motherwell	27 August 1975

=== Group 2 ===
Team	Pld	W	D	L	GF	GA	GD	Pts
Hibernian	6	5	0	1	14	4	+10	10
Ayr United	6	2	3	1	11	9	+2	7
Dundee	6	1	2	3	9	10	−1	4
Dunfermline Athletic	6	0	3	3	4	15	−11	3

Home team	Score	Away team	Date
Dunfermline Athletic	1–1	Ayr United	9 August 1975
Hibernian	2–0	Dundee	9 August 1975
Ayr United	2–1	Hibernian	13 August 1975
Dundee	4–0	Dunfermline Athletic	13 August 1975
Ayr United	1–1	Dundee	16 August 1975
Hibernian	3–0	Dunfermline Athletic	16 August 1975
Dunfermline Athletic	1–1	Dundee	20 August 1975
Hibernian	2–1	Ayr United	20 August 1975
Dundee	2–4	Ayr United	23 August 1975
Dunfermline Athletic	0–4	Hibernian	23 August 1975
Ayr United	2–2	Dunfermline Athletic	27 August 1975
Dundee	1–2	Hibernian	27 August 1975

=== Group 3 ===
Team	Pld	W	D	L	GF	GA	GD	Pts
Celtic	6	5	0	1	17	4	+13	10
Heart of Midlothian	6	4	0	2	13	8	+5	8
Aberdeen	6	2	0	4	4	6	−2	4
Dumbarton	6	1	0	5	5	21	−16	2

Home team	Score	Away team	Date
Celtic	1–0	Aberdeen	9 August 1975
Dumbarton	2–1	Heart of Midlothian	9 August 1975
Aberdeen	2–0	Dumbarton	13 August 1975
Heart of Midlothian	2–0	Celtic	13 August 1975
Aberdeen	1–2	Heart of Midlothian	16 August 1975
Celtic	3–1	Dumbarton	16 August 1975
Celtic	3–1	Heart of Midlothian	20 August 1975
Dumbarton	0–1	Aberdeen	20 August 1975
Dumbarton	0–8	Celtic	23 August 1975
Heart of Midlothian	1–0	Aberdeen	23 August 1975
Aberdeen	0–2	Celtic	27 August 1975
Heart of Midlothian	6–2	Dumbarton	27 August 1975

=== Group 4 ===
Team	Pld	W	D	L	GF	GA	GD	Pts
Partick Thistle	6	6	0	0	17	6	+11	12
Dundee United	6	3	0	3	8	8	0	6
Kilmarnock	6	2	0	4	5	9	−4	4
St Johnstone	6	1	0	5	6	13	−7	2

Home team	Score	Away team	Date
Dundee United	2–1	St Johnstone	9 August 1975
Kilmarnock	1–3	Partick Thistle	9 August 1975
Partick Thistle	3–1	Dundee United	13 August 1975
St Johnstone	2–1	Kilmarnock	13 August 1975
Dundee United	2–0	Kilmarnock	16 August 1975
St Johnstone	2–4	Partick Thistle	16 August 1975
Dundee United	1–2	Partick Thistle	20 August 1975
Kilmarnock	1–0	St Johnstone	20 August 1975
Kilmarnock	1–0	Dundee United	23 August 1975
Partick Thistle	3–0	St Johnstone	23 August 1975
Partick Thistle	2–1	Kilmarnock	27 August 1975
St Johnstone	1–2	Dundee United	27 August 1975

=== Group 5 ===
Team	Pld	W	D	L	GF	GA	GD	Pts
Queen of the South	6	3	1	2	7	6	+1	7
Hamilton Academical	6	2	2	2	6	5	+1	6
Falkirk	6	2	2	2	5	7	−2	6
Stirling Albion	6	2	1	3	7	7	0	5

Home team	Score	Away team	Date
Falkirk	0–1	Hamilton Academical	9 August 1975
Queen of the South	2–0	Stirling Albion	9 August 1975
Hamilton Academical	0–2	Queen of the South	13 August 1975
Stirling Albion	3–0	Falkirk	13 August 1975
Falkirk	0–0	Queen of the South	16 August 1975
Hamilton Academical	0–0	Stirling Albion	16 August 1975
Falkirk	2–1	Stirling Albion	20 August 1975
Queen of the South	0–3	Hamilton Academical	20 August 1975
Queen of the South	0–1	Falkirk	23 August 1975
Stirling Albion	1–0	Hamilton Academical	23 August 1975
Hamilton Academical	2–2	Falkirk	27 August 1975
Stirling Albion	2–3	Queen of the South	27 August 1975

=== Group 6 ===
Team	Pld	W	D	L	GF	GA	GD	Pts
Montrose	6	3	2	1	11	6	+5	8
East Fife	6	2	2	2	8	9	−1	6
Raith Rovers	6	2	2	2	7	8	−1	6
St Mirren	6	1	2	3	5	8	−3	4

Home team	Score	Away team	Date
Raith Rovers	2–1	Montrose	9 August 1975
St Mirren	2–1	East Fife	9 August 1975
East Fife	2–2	Raith Rovers	13 August 1975
Montrose	1–1	St Mirren	13 August 1975
Montrose	4–0	East Fife	16 August 1975
Raith Rovers	1–0	St Mirren	16 August 1975
Raith Rovers	0–2	East Fife	20 August 1975
St Mirren	1–2	Montrose	20 August 1975
East Fife	1–1	Montrose	23 August 1975
St Mirren	1–1	Raith Rovers	23 August 1975
East Fife	2–0	St Mirren	27 August 1975
Montrose	2–1	Raith Rovers	27 August 1975

=== Group 7 ===
Team	Pld	W	D	L	GF	GA	GD	Pts
Clydebank	6	4	1	1	7	7	0	9
Arbroath	6	4	0	2	13	3	+10	8
East Stirlingshire	6	1	2	3	6	12	−6	4
Berwick Rangers	6	1	1	4	6	10	−4	3

Home team	Score	Away team	Date
Arbroath	4–0	Clydebank	9 August 1975
Berwick Rangers	1–2	East Stirlingshire	9 August 1975
Clydebank	3–2	Berwick Rangers	13 August 1975
East Stirlingshire	0–4	Arbroath	13 August 1975
Berwick Rangers	1–0	Arbroath	16 August 1975
Clydebank	1–1	East Stirlingshire	16 August 1975
Arbroath	3–1	East Stirlingshire	20 August 1975
Berwick Rangers	0–1	Clydebank	20 August 1975
Arbroath	2–0	Berwick Rangers	23 August 1975
East Stirlingshire	0–1	Clydebank	23 August 1975
Clydebank	1–0	Arbroath	27 August 1975
East Stirlingshire	2–2	Berwick Rangers	27 August 1975

=== Group 8 ===
Team	Pld	W	D	L	GF	GA	GD	Pts
Stenhousemuir	6	3	2	1	7	7	0	8
Stranraer	6	3	1	2	13	10	+3	7
Morton	6	3	0	3	11	11	0	6
Albion Rovers	6	1	1	4	5	8	−3	3

Home team	Score	Away team	Date
Albion Rovers	0–1	Morton	9 August 1975
Stranraer	0–0	Stenhousemuir	9 August 1975
Morton	2–5	Stranraer	13 August 1975
Stenhousemuir	0–0	Albion Rovers	13 August 1975
Morton	4–1	Stenhousemuir	16 August 1975
Stranraer	3–2	Albion Rovers	16 August 1975
Albion Rovers	0–1	Stenhousemuir	20 August 1975
Stranraer	2–1	Morton	20 August 1975
Albion Rovers	2–1	Stranraer	23 August 1975
Stenhousemuir	2–1	Morton	23 August 1975
Morton	2–1	Albion Rovers	27 August 1975
Stenhousemuir	3–2	Stranraer	27 August 1975

=== Group 9 ===
Team	Pld	W	D	L	GF	GA	GD	Pts
Cowdenbeath	5	4	0	1	15	7	+8	8
Queen's Park	5	3	0	2	10	5	+5	6
Meadowbank Thistle	5	2	1	2	8	5	+3	5
Brechin City	5	2	1	2	7	12	−5	5
Forfar Athletic	5	2	0	3	9	16	−7	4
Alloa Athletic	5	1	0	4	5	9	−4	2

Home team	Score	Away team	Date
Alloa Athletic	1–3	Cowdenbeath	9 August 1975
Brechin City	1–1	Meadowbank Thistle	9 August 1975
Queen's Park	5–0	Forfar Athletic	9 August 1975
Cowdenbeath	5–2	Brechin City	13 August 1975
Forfar Athletic	2–1	Alloa Athletic	13 August 1975
Meadowbank Thistle	1–2	Queen's Park	13 August 1975
Alloa Athletic	1–2	Queen's Park	16 August 1975
Cowdenbeath	0–2	Meadowbank Thistle	16 August 1975
Forfar Athletic	4–0	Brechin City	16 August 1975
Meadowbank Thistle	0–1	Alloa Athletic	18 August 1975
Brechin City	2–1	Alloa Athletic	23 August 1975
Meadowbank Thistle	4–1	Forfar Athletic	23 August 1975
Queen's Park	0–1	Cowdenbeath	23 August 1975
Cowdenbeath	6–2	Forfar Athletic	27 August 1975
Queen's Park	1–2	Brechin City	27 August 1975

== Supplementary round ==
=== First leg ===
Home team	Score	Away team	Date
Cowdenbeath	0–2	Clydebank	2 September 1975

=== Second leg ===
Home team	Score	Away team	Date	Agg
Clydebank	2–0	Cowdenbeath	3 September 1975	4–0

== Quarter-finals ==
=== First leg ===
Home team	Score	Away team	Date
Hibernian	1–0	Montrose	10 September 1975
Partick Thistle	4–0	Clydebank	10 September 1975
Rangers	1–0	Queen of the South	10 September 1975
Stenhousemuir	0–2	Celtic	10 September 1975

=== Second leg ===
Home team	Score	Away team	Date	Agg
Celtic	1–0	Stenhousemuir	24 September 1975	3–0
Clydebank	1–0	Partick Thistle	24 September 1975	1–4
Montrose	3–1	Hibernian	24 September 1975	3–2
Queen of the South	2–2	Rangers	24 September 1975	2–3

== Semi-finals ==
Home team	Score	Away team	Date
Celtic	1–0	Partick Thistle	6 October 1975
Rangers	5–1	Montrose	8 October 1975

== Final ==
25 October 1975

Rangers	1–0	Celtic
MacDonald

Hampden Park, Glasgow
Attendance: 58,806
