= Graham Shaw (footballer, born 1951) =

Scottish footballer

Personal information
- Date of birth: 8 October 1951 (age 75)
- Place of birth: Edinburgh, Scotland
- Positions: Forward; midfielder

Youth career
- Musselburgh Athletic

Senior career*
Years	Team	Apps	(Gls)
1971–1975	Dunfermline Athletic	117	(52)
1975–1980	Heart of Midlothian	102	(15)
1980–1985	Arbroath	127	(26)
Total		346	(93)
- * Club domestic league appearances and goals

Graham Shaw (born 8 October 1951) is a Scottish former footballer who made nearly 350 appearances in the Scottish Football League, playing for Dunfermline Athletic, Heart of Midlothian and Arbroath between 1971 and 1985.
