= John Hagart =

Scottish footballer and manager

Personal information
- Full name: John Hagart
- Date of birth: 19 November 1937
- Place of birth: Edinburgh, Scotland
- Date of death: 1 June 2010 (aged 72)
- Place of death: Scotland
- Position: Wing half

Youth career
- Armadale Thistle

Senior career*
Years	Team	Apps	(Gls)
1960–1961	Berwick Rangers	5	(0)
- Armadale Thistle

Managerial career
- 1974–1977: Heart of Midlothian
- 1979–1982: Falkirk
- 1983–1986: Rangers (reserve team coach)
- 1987: Partick Thistle (caretaker)
- * Club domestic league appearances and goals

John Hagart (19 November 1937 – 1 June 2010) was a Scottish football player and manager. He bossed Scottish sides Hearts and Falkirk during the later 1970s and early 1980s.

Hagart had a modest playing career, making only five senior league appearances for Berwick Rangers during the 1960–61 season. He also played in the junior leagues for Armadale Thistle.

Hagart was appointed manager of Heart of Midlothian on 12 October 1974 replacing Bobby Seith. After two seasons in the Premier Division the club was relegated, for the first time in its history, during the 1976–77 season. The side finished second bottom in the league with Hagart taking full responsibility and being dismissed on 23 April 1977.

Hagart signed up as Falkirk manager in 1979. He guided the then Division Two side to promotion in season 1979–80. Two mid-table finishes in the following seasons led to Hagart leaving in 1982.

A year later Hagart accepted the position of reserve team coach at Rangers working under then new manager Jock Wallace. He left along with Wallace when Graeme Souness arrived at the club.
