= Jim Jefferies (footballer) =

Scottish footballer and manager

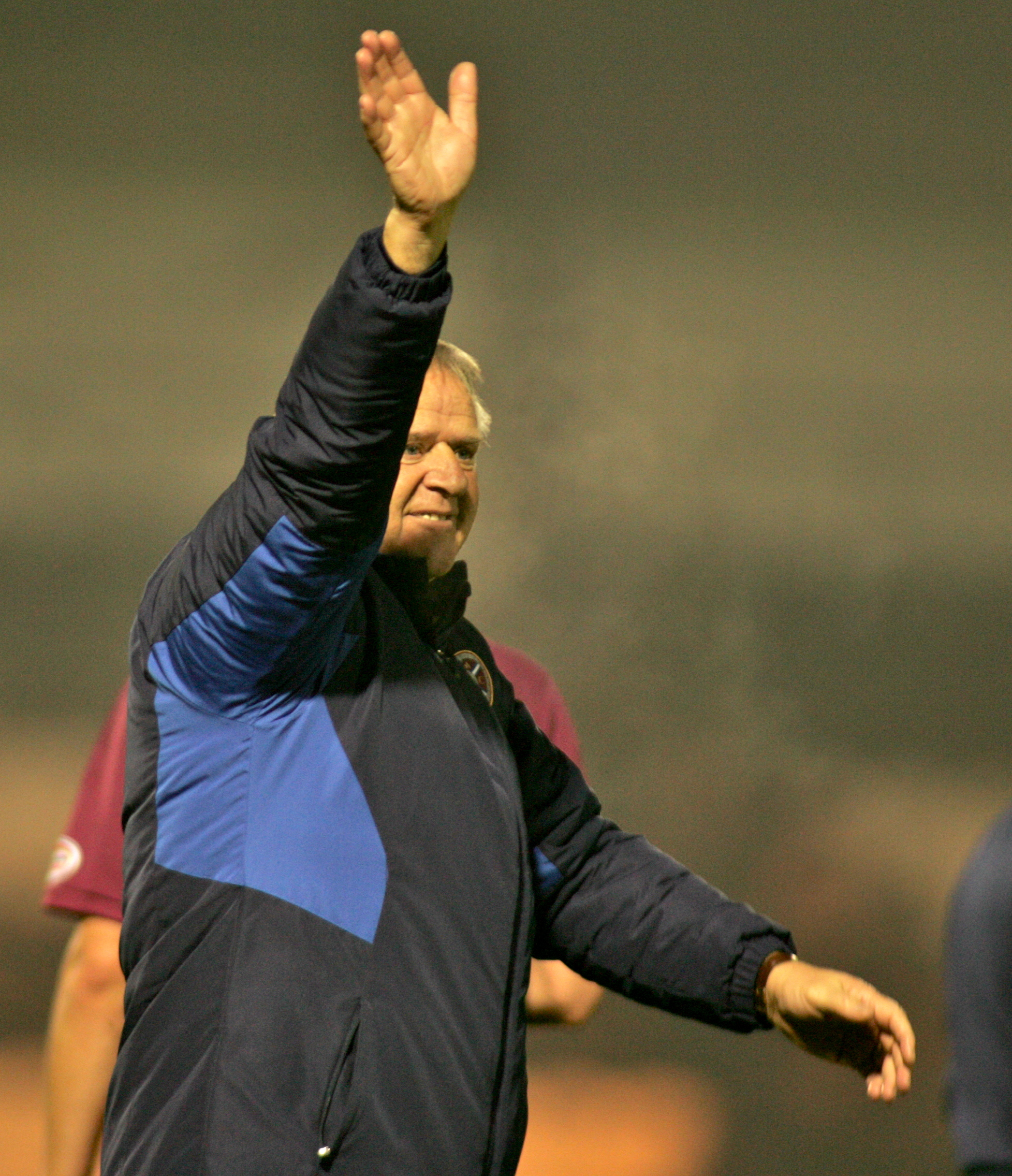
- Jefferies in his second spell as Hearts manager

Personal information
- Date of birth: 22 November 1950 (age 76)
- Place of birth: Musselburgh, Scotland
- Position: Right back

Youth career
- 1965–1967: Gorgie Hearts

Senior career*
Years	Team	Apps	(Gls)
1967–1981	Heart of Midlothian	227	(5)
1967–1968	→ Haddington Athletic (loan)		
1968–1969	→ Gala Fairydean (loan)		
1981–1983	Berwick Rangers	71	(0)

Managerial career
- 1983: Hawick Royal Albert
- 1983–1988: Gala Fairydean
- 1988–1990: Berwick Rangers
- 1990–1995: Falkirk
- 1995–2000: Heart of Midlothian
- 2000–2001: Bradford City
- 2002–2010: Kilmarnock
- 2010–2011: Heart of Midlothian
- 2012–2014: Dunfermline Athletic
- 2017–2020: Edinburgh City (sporting director)
- * Club domestic league appearances and goals

James Jefferies (born 22 November 1950) is a Scottish football manager and former player. Jefferies played for Heart of Midlothian for almost his whole playing career and enjoyed a successful first managerial spell with the club, winning the 1998 Scottish Cup. Jefferies has also managed Gala Fairydean, Berwick Rangers, Falkirk, Bradford City, Kilmarnock and Dunfermline Athletic.

== Playing career ==
Jefferies made more than 300 competitive appearances for Heart of Midlothian. The main highlight of his playing career was playing in the 1976 Scottish Cup Final, which Hearts lost 3–1 to Rangers. Jefferies eventually left Hearts in 1981, and spent the last two seasons of his career with Berwick Rangers.

== Managerial career ==
=== Gala Fairydean ===
Jefferies left Berwick in 1983 to become a manager at East of Scotland Football League club Gala Fairydean.

=== Berwick Rangers ===
Jefferies returned to the Wee Gers as manager in September 1988. Despite a great deal of financial turmoil during that time, he turned the struggling team around to the extent that they set a club record of 21 games unbeaten in the league during season 1988–89.

=== Falkirk ===
In the 1990 close season Jefferies took over at Falkirk, guiding them to the Scottish First Division title (and promotion to the Scottish Premier Division) in 1991 and 1994. Falkirk also won the Scottish Challenge Cup in 1993.

=== Heart of Midlothian ===
In August 1995, Jefferies returned to Hearts. He was manager of the Hearts team that won the Scottish Cup in 1998, his greatest success in the game to date.

=== Bradford City ===
Jefferies moved south of the border on 20 November 2000 to replace Chris Hutchings as manager of then Premier League side Bradford City. He was given the task of selling players by chairman Geoffrey Richmond and was unable to prevent them from going down. He resigned in December 2001, after a poor start to the season had left Bradford with no hope of a promotion challenge.

=== Kilmarnock ===
On 28 February 2002, he returned to management back in his native Scotland with Kilmarnock. He kept Kilmarnock in a respectable position despite the necessity of drastically reducing the club's wage bill, reaching the 2007 Scottish League Cup Final. Following Alex McLeish's departure from Rangers at the end of the 2005–06 season, Jefferies was the longest-serving manager in the Scottish Premier League. He left Kilmarnock by "mutual consent" on 11 January 2010.

=== Return to Heart of Midlothian ===
Jefferies was appointed manager of Hearts for a second time on 29 January 2010, just hours after Csaba László was sacked from the position. Hearts finished third in the SPL in the 2010–11 season, having threatened the dominance of the Old Firm until falling away after February. Jefferies and right-hand man Billy Brown were sacked by Hearts on 1 August 2011, after just two games of the 2011–12 Scottish Premier League season.

=== Dunfermline Athletic ===
Jefferies held talks with Dunfermline Athletic about succeeding Jim McIntyre as their manager and was appointed on 20 March. He was unable to keep the Pars in the top flight and were relegated at the end of the season. The following season in the Scottish First Division the club ran into financial difficulties and were placed in administration in March 2013. This led to a 15-point deduction penalty by the Scottish Football League as well as many first-team players leaving. The effect of the points penalty saw Jefferies' side relegated to the Scottish Second Division through the Scottish First Division play-offs losing to Alloa Athletic in the two-legged final. Jefferies signed a new contract with Dunfermline in December 2013, after the club exited administration. He resigned as manager in December 2014 stating that he felt there was no other option than for him to leave the club. He also stated that Dunfermline was likely to be his last job in management.

=== Advisor roles ===
In February 2017, Jefferies joined the board of directors at Edinburgh City in a "sporting director" capacity. In July 2020, Edinburgh City confirmed that Jefferies had departed his role as sporting director to return to Hearts.

During the 2020–21 season Jefferies worked as an advisor to club owner Ann Budge, assisting with player recruitment. He left the club during the 2021 close season.

== Personal life ==
In September 2019 he suffered a heart attack whilst golfing with former Hibernian player Mike Korotkich. The wife of Korotkich was part of the paramedic team that were called for Jeffries.

== Honours ==
=== Player ===
Heart of Midlothian

- Scottish Cup
  - Runners-up: 1975–76
- Scottish First Division: (1) 1979–80
  - Runners-up: 1977–78
- Texaco Cup
  - Runners-up: 1970–71
- East of Scotland Shield: (4) 1972–73, 1973–74, 1974–75, 1975–76

=== Manager ===
Gala Fairydean Rovers

- Scottish Qualifying Cup South: (4) 1983, 1984, 1985, 1987
- East of Scotland Qualifying Cup: (2) 1986–87, 1987–88
- East of Scotland (City) Cup: (1) 1987–88

Falkirk

- Scottish First Division: (2) 1990–91, 1993–94
- Scottish Challenge Cup: (1) 1993–94
- Stirlingshire Cup: (2) 1992–93, 1994–95

Heart of Midlothian

- Scottish Cup: (1) 1997–98
  - Runners-up: 1995–96
- Scottish League Cup:
  - Runners-up: 1996–97

=== Individual ===
- SFL Premier Division Manager of the Year: 1994–95
- SFL Scottish Manager of the Year: 1997–98
- Heart of Midlothian Hall of Fame: Inducted, 2009
  - 1998 Scottish Cup winning team, 2018
- Scottish Borders Sporting Hall of Fame: Inducted, 2019
- Scottish Premier League Manager of the Month: August 2006
- Scottish Premier League Manager of the Month: August 2008
- Scottish Premier League Manager of the Month: November 2010

== See also ==
- List of football managers with the most matches
