= Willie Gibson (footballer, born 1953) =

Scottish footballer

Personal information
- Date of birth: 3 April 1953 (age 73)
- Place of birth: St Andrews, Scotland
- Position: Forward

Youth career
- Methil Star

Senior career*
Years	Team	Apps	(Gls)
1973–1981	Hearts	245	(85)
1981	Partick Thistle	2	(1)
1981–1982	Raith Rovers	34	(9)
1982–1983	Cowdenbeath	22	(13)
Total		303	(108)
- * Club domestic league appearances and goals

Willie Gibson (born 3 April 1953) is a Scottish former professional footballer who played as a forward.

== Career ==
Born in St Andrews, Gibson played for Methil Star, Hearts, Partick Thistle, Raith Rovers and Cowdenbeath.
