= 1969–70 Heart of Midlothian F.C. season =

Heart of Midlothian
1969–70 season
- Manager: John Harvey (to 30 November); Bobby Seith (from 1 December)
- Stadium: Tynecastle Park
- Scottish First Division: 4th
- Scottish Cup: 2nd Round
- League Cup: Group Stage

During the 1969–70 season, Heart of Midlothian F.C. competed in the Scottish First Division, the Scottish Cup, the Scottish League Cup and the East of Scotland Shield.

== Squad ==
Note: Flags indicate national team as defined under FIFA eligibility rules; some limited exceptions apply. Players may hold more than one non-FIFA nationality.

No.	Pos.	Nation	Player
—	GK	SCO	Jim Cruickshank
—	GK	SCO	Kenny Garland
—	DF	SCO	Jim Jefferies
—	DF	SCO	Roy Kay
—	DF	SCO	David Clunie
—	DF	SCO	Jim Brown
—	DF	SCO	Alan Anderson
—	DF	SCO	Andy Lynch
—	DF	SCO	Ian Sneddon
—	DF	SCO	Peter Oliver
—	DF	SCO	Eddie Thomson
—	DF	SCO	Willie McAlpine
—	DF	SCO	Arthur Thomson
—	DF	SCO	Alan MacDonald

No.	Pos.	Nation	Player
—	DF	SCO	George Wood
—	MF	SCO	George Fleming
—	MF	SCO	Jim Townsend
—	MF	SCO	Tommy Veitch
—	MF	SCO	Tommy Traynor
—	MF	NOR	Roald Jensen
—	MF	SCO	Neil Murray
—	MF	SCO	Wilson Wood
—	FW	SCO	Donald Ford
—	FW	SCO	Ernie Winchester
—	FW	SCO	Eric Carruthers
—	FW	SCO	Jim Irvine
—	FW	DEN	René Møller

== Fixtures ==
=== Friendlies ===
26 July 1969 Friendly	Carlisle United	5–0	Hearts	Brunton Park
	Goal

30 July 1969 Friendly	Newcastle United	1–0	Hearts	St James' Park
	Goal

2 August 1969 Friendly	Hearts	1–1	Tottenham Hotspur	Tynecastle Park
	Goal

6 October 1969 Friendly	Hearts	4–1	Dallas Tornado	Tynecastle Park
	Goal

6 April 1970 Friendly	Montrose	1–0	Hearts	Links Park
	Goal

24 April 1970 Friendly	Hearts	0–0	Coventry City	Tynecastle Park
	Goal

=== East of Scotland Shield ===
17 March 1970 Final	Hibernian	1–2	Hearts	Easter Road
			Willie Pettigrew; Pat Byrne; Willie Pettigrew; Willie Pettigrew; Willie Pettigrew

1 May 1970 Final	Hearts	3–2	Hibernian	Tynecastle Park
			Willie Pettigrew; Pat Byrne; Willie Pettigrew; Willie Pettigrew; Willie Pettigrew

=== League Cup ===
9 August 1969 League Cup Group	Dundee United	2–3	Hearts	Tannadice Park
				Attendance: 9,537

13 August 1969 League Cup Group	Hearts	0–0	St Mirren	Tynecastle Park
				Attendance: 9,286

16 August 1969 League Cup Group	Hearts	0–1	Morton	Tynecastle Park
				Attendance: 10,242

20 August 1969 League Cup Group	St Mirren	1–0	Hearts	St Mirren Park, Love Street
				Attendance: 4,312

23 August 1969 League Cup Group	Hearts	1–0	Dundee United	Tynecastle Park
				Attendance: 6,000

27 August 1969 League Cup Group	Morton	0–2	Hearts	Cappielow Park
				Attendance: 6,493

=== Scottish Cup ===
24 January 1970 Scottish Cup R1	Montrose	3–0	Hearts	Links Park
				Attendance: 4,419

28 January 1970 Scottish Cup R1 Replay	Hearts	1–0	Montrose	Tynecastle Park
				Attendance: 13,211

7 February 1970 Scottish Cup R2	Kilmarnock	2–0	Hearts	Rugby Park
				Attendance: 14,712

=== Scottish First Division ===
30 August 1969 Scottish First Division	Hearts	0–1	Morton	Tynecastle Park
				Attendance: 9,315

3 September 1969 Scottish First Division	Airdrieonains	1–2	Hearts	Broomfield Park
				Attendance: 2,751

6 September 1969 Scottish First Division	St Johnstone	3–3	Hearts	Muirton Park
				Attendance: 9,289

13 September 1969 Scottish First Division	Hearts	4–1	Kilmarnock	Tynecastle Park
				Attendance: 8,867

20 September 1969 Scottish First Division	Dunfermline Athletic	1–0	Hearts	East End Park
				Attendance: 10,098

27 September 1969 Scottish First Division	Hearts	0–2	Hibernian	Tynecastle Park
				Attendance: 26,807

4 October 1969 Scottish First Division	St Mirren	0–0	Hearts	St Mirren Park, Love Street
				Attendance: 5,168

11 October 1969 Scottish First Division	Hearts	2–2	Motherwell	Tynecastle Park
				Attendance: 10,307

18 October 1969 Scottish First Division	Ayr United	0–0	Hearts	Somerset Park
				Attendance: 10,061

25 October 1969 Scottish First Division	Hearts	1–1	Partick Thistle	Tynecastle Park
				Attendance: 8,095

1 November 1969 Scottish First Division	Hearts	3–2	Raith Rovers	Tynecastle Park
				Attendance: 6,605

8 November 1969 Scottish First Division	Celtic	0–2	Hearts	Tynecastle Park
				Attendance: 32,683

15 November 1969 Scottish First Division	Hearts	2–2	Aberdeen	Tynecastle Park
				Attendance: 11,410

22 November 1969 Scottish First Division	Dundee	2–0	Hearts	Tynecastle Park
				Attendance: 4,727

6 December 1969 Scottish First Division	Hearts	1–2	Rangers	Tynecastle Park
				Attendance: 28,950

13 December 1969 Scottish First Division	Morton	2–3	Hearts	Cappielow Park
				Attendance: 2,825

16 December 1969 Scottish First Division	Clyde	2–1	Hearts	Tynecastle Park
				Attendance: 1,585

20 December 1969 Scottish First Division	Hearts	5–0	Airdrieonians	Tynecastle Park
				Attendance: 6,144

27 December 1969 Scottish First Division	Hearts	2–2	Dundee United	Tynecastle Park
				Attendance: 11,253

1 January 1970 Scottish First Division	Hibernian	0–0	Hearts	Easter Road
				Attendance: 36,421

3 January 1970 Scottish First Division	Hearts	2–0	Dunfermline Athletic	Tynecastle Park
				Attendance: 14,535

10 January 1970 Scottish First Division	Dundee United	2–3	Hearts	Tannadice Park
				Attendance: 8,159

17 January 1970 Scottish First Division	Kilmarnock	0–0	Hearts	Rugby Park
				Attendance: 5,593

31 January 1970 Scottish First Division	Hearts	0–0	St Johnstone	Tynecastle Park
				Attendance: 10,317

21 February 1970 Scottish First Division	Hearts	1–0	St Mirren	Tynecastle Park
				Attendance: 8,307

28 February 1970 Scottish First Division	Motherwell	0–2	Hearts	Fir Park
				Attendance: 7,575

7 March 1970 Scottish First Division	Hearts	3–0	Ayr United	Tynecastle Park
				Attendance: 8,587

14 March 1970 Scottish First Division	Partick Thistle	1–0	Hearts	Firhill Park
				Attendance: 4,106

21 March 1970 Scottish First Division	Raith Rovers	0–3	Hearts	Stark's Park
				Attendance: 4,758

25 March 1970 Scottish First Division	Rangers	3–2	Hearts	Ibrox Park
				Attendance: 13,270

28 March 1970 Scottish First Division	Hearts	0–0	Celtic	Tynecastle Park
				Attendance: 27,690

4 April 1970 Scottish First Division	Aberdeen	0–1	Hearts	Pittodrie Stadium
				Attendance: 9,257

11 April 1970 Scottish First Division	Hearts	1–1	Clyde	Tynecastle Park
				Attendance: 7,344

18 April 1970 Scottish First Division	Hearts	1–3	Dundee	Tynecastle Park
				Attendance: 7,544

== See also ==
- List of Heart of Midlothian F.C. seasons
