= 1970–71 Heart of Midlothian F.C. season =

Heart of Midlothian
1970–71 season
- Manager: John Harvey (to 30 November); Bobby Seith (from 1 December)
- Stadium: Tynecastle Park
- Scottish First Division: 11th
- Scottish Cup: 4th Round
- League Cup: Group Stage
- Texaco Cup: Finalists

During the 1970–71 season, Heart of Midlothian F.C. competed in the Scottish First Division, the Scottish Cup, the Scottish League Cup, the Texaco Cup and the East of Scotland Shield.

== Squad ==
Note: Flags indicate national team as defined under FIFA eligibility rules; some limited exceptions apply. Players may hold more than one non-FIFA nationality.

No.	Pos.	Nation	Player
—	GK	SCO	Jim Cruickshank
—	GK	SCO	Kenny Garland
—	DF	SCO	Jim Jefferies
—	DF	SCO	Roy Kay
—	DF	SCO	David Clunie
—	DF	SCO	Jim Brown
—	DF	SCO	Alan Anderson
—	DF	SCO	Andy Lynch
—	DF	SCO	Ian Sneddon
—	DF	SCO	Peter Oliver
—	DF	SCO	Eddie Thomson
—	DF	SCO	Arthur Thomson
—	MF	SCO	George Fleming

No.	Pos.	Nation	Player
—	MF	SCO	Jim Townsend
—	MF	SCO	Tommy Veitch
—	MF	NOR	Roald Jensen
—	MF	SCO	Neil Murray
—	MF	SCO	Wilson Wood
—	MF	SCO	Drew Young
—	MF	SCO	Brian Laing
—	MF	AUS	Jimmy Cant
—	MF	SCO	Joe Morgan
—	FW	SCO	Donald Ford
—	FW	SCO	Ernie Winchester
—	FW	SCO	Eric Carruthers
—	FW	SCO	Kevin Hegarty

== Fixtures ==
=== Friendlies ===
1 August 1970 Friendly	Hearts	4–2	Dunfermline Athletic	Tynecastle Park
	Goal

3 August 1970 Friendly	West Bromwich Albion	2–0	Hearts	The Hawthorns
	Goal

2 December 1970 Friendly	Hearts	0–0 (match abandoned)	Gornik Zabrze	Tynecastle Park
	Goal			Attendance: 6,426

6 May 1971 Overseas Tour	Dallas Tornado	0–0	Hearts	Franklin Field, Dallas, Texas
	Goal

10 May 1971 Overseas Tour	St Louis All Stars	1–2	Hearts	Busch Memorial Stadium, St Louis, Missouri
	Goal

12 May 1971 Overseas Tour	Atlanta Chiefs	1–0	Hearts	Atlanta Stadium, Atlanta, Georgia
	Goal

16 May 1971 Overseas Tour	Washington Darts	0–3	Hearts	Brookland Stadium, Washington DC
	Goal

18 May 1971 Overseas Tour	Philadelphia Spartans	0–4	Hearts	Temple Stadium, Philadelphia, Pennsylvania
	Goal

21 May 1971 Overseas Tour	New York Cosmos	2–4	Hearts	Yankee Stadium, New York City
	Goal

24 May 1971 Overseas Tour	Toronto Metros	0–3	Hearts	Varsity Stadium, Toronto, Ontario
	Goal

26 May 1971 Overseas Tour	Rochester Lancers	0–0	Hearts	Aquinas Memorial Stadium, Rochester, New York
	Goal

27 May 1971 Overseas Tour	Newton	1–1	Hearts	Boston, Massachusetts
	Goal

30 May 1971 Overseas Tour	Montreal Olympique	0–7	Hearts	Autostade, Montreal, Quebec
	Goal

=== East of Scotland Shield ===
24 October 1970 Final	Hibernian	1–0	Hearts	Easter Road

=== Texaco Cup ===
15 September 1970 Texaco Cup 1st Round 1st Leg	Burnley	3–1	Hearts	Turf Moor
			Goal

30 September 1970 Texaco Cup 1st Round 2nd Leg	Hearts	4–1	Burnley	Tynecastle Park
			Goal

19 October 1970 Texaco Cup Quarter-Final 1st Leg	Airdrieonians	0–5	Hearts	Broomfield Park
			Goal

4 November 1970 Texaco Cup Quarter-Final 2nd Leg	Hearts	2–3	Airdrieonians	Tynecastle Park
			Goal

16 December 1970 Texaco Cup Semi-Final 1st Leg	Hearts	1–1	Motherwell	Tynecastle Park
			Goal

3 March 1971 Texaco Cup Semi-Final 2nd Leg	Motherwell	1–2	Hearts	Fir Park
			Goal

14 April 1971 Texaco Cup Final 1st Leg	Hearts	1–3	Wolverhampton Wanderers	Tynecastle Park
			Goal

3 May 1971 Texaco Cup Final 2nd Leg	Wolverhampton Wanderers	0–1	Hearts	Molineux Stadium
			Goal

=== League Cup ===
8 August 1970 League Cup Group	Hearts	1–2	Celtic	Tynecastle Park
				Attendance: 30,849

12 August 1970 League Cup Group	Dundee United	2–1	Hearts	Tannadice Park
				Attendance: 7,245

15 August 1970 League Cup Group	Hearts	1–2	Clyde	Tynecastle Park
				Attendance: 8,198

19 August 1970 League Cup Group	Hearts	0–0	Dundee United	Tynecastle Park
				Attendance: 7,088

22 August 1970 League Cup Group	Celtic	4–2	Hearts	Celtic Park
				Attendance: 38,463

26 August 1970 League Cup Group	Clyde	1–5	Hearts	Shawfield Stadium
				Attendance: 1,160

=== Scottish Cup ===
23 January 1971 Scottish Cup R3	Hearts	3–0	Stranraer	Tynecastle Park
				Attendance: 9,055

13 February 1971 Scottish Cup R4	Hearts	1–2	Hibernian	Tynecastle Park
				Attendance: 30,450

=== Scottish First Division ===
29 August 1970 Scottish First Division	Hearts	1–3	St Johnstone	Tynecastle Park
				Attendance: 10,347

5 September 1970 Scottish First Division	Hibernian	0–0	Hearts	Easter Road
				Attendance: 23,225

12 September 1970 Scottish First Division	Hearts	3–0	Dunfermline Athletic	Tynecastle Park
				Attendance: 8,347

19 September 1970 Scottish First Division	Clyde	1–0	Hearts	Shawfield Stadium
				Attendance: 2,679

26 September 1970 Scottish First Division	Hearts	5–2	Airdrieonians	Tynecastle Park
				Attendance: 9,516

3 October 1970 Scottish First Division	Kilmarnock	3–0	Hearts	Rugby Park
				Attendance: 5,365

10 October 1970 Scottish First Division	Hearts	0–1	Rangers	Tynecastle Park
				Attendance: 31,661

17 October 1970 Scottish First Division	Dundee	1–0	Hearts	Dens Park
				Attendance: 4,121

28 October 1970 Scottish First Division	Celtic	3–2	Hearts	Celtic Park
				Attendance: 16,795

7 November 1970 Scottish First Division	St Mirren	0–1	Hearts	St Mirren Park, Love Street
				Attendance: 4,561

11 November 1970 Scottish First Division	Hearts	1–1	Falkirk	Tynecastle Park
				Attendance: 7,469

14 November 1970 Scottish First Division	Hearts	1–0	Dundee United	Tynecastle Park
				Attendance: 8,286

21 November 1970 Scottish First Division	Aberdeen	1–0	Hearts	Pittodrie Stadium
				Attendance: 12,497

28 November 1970 Scottish First Division	Hearts	2–1	Ayr United	Tynecastle Park
				Attendance: 7,935

5 December 1970 Scottish First Division	Hearts	2–2	Morton	Tynecastle Park
				Attendance: 8,721

12 December 1970 Scottish First Division	Motherwell	1–2	Hearts	Fir Park
				Attendance: 5,784

19 December 1970 Scottish First Division	Hearts	1–0	Cowdenbeath	Tynecastle Park
				Attendance: 6,442

26 December 1970 Scottish First Division	St Johnstone	2–1	Hearts	Muirton Park
				Attendance: 5,928

1 January 1971 Scottish First Division	Hearts	0–0	Hibernian	Tynecastle Park
				Attendance: 27,715

9 January 1971 Scottish First Division	Hearts	3–1	Clyde	Tynecastle Park
				Attendance: 7,698

16 January 1971 Scottish First Division	Airdireonians	0–0	Hearts	Broomfield Park
				Attendance: 4,455

30 January 1971 Scottish First Division	Hearts	2–0	Kilmarnock	Tynecastle Park
				Attendance: 8,823

6 February 1971 Scottish First Division	Rangers	1–0	Hearts	Ibrox Park
				Attendance: 29,898

20 February 1971 Scottish First Division	Hearts	0–0	Dundee	Tynecastle Park
				Attendance: 7,268

27 February 1971 Scottish First Division	Hearts	1–1	Celtic	Tynecastle Park
				Attendance: 23,464

6 March 1971 Scottish First Division	Falkirk	2–4	Hearts	Brockville Park
				Attendance: 7,575

13 March 1971 Scottish First Division	Hearts	1–0	St Mirren	Tynecastle Park
				Attendance: 8,143

20 March 1971 Scottish First Division	Dundee United	4–1	Hearts	Tannadice Park
				Attendance: 4,106

24 March 1971 Scottish First Division	Dunfermline Athletic	1–2	Hearts	East End Park
				Attendance: 7,240

27 March 1971 Scottish First Division	Hearts	1–3	Aberdeen	Tynecastle Park
				Attendance: 12,201

3 April 1971 Scottish First Division	Ayr United	1–0	Hearts	Somerset Park
				Attendance: 5,406

10 April 1971 Scottish First Division	Morton	3–0	Hearts	Cappielow Park
				Attendance: 3,200

17 April 1971 Scottish First Division	Hearts	0–1	Motherwell	Tynecastle Park
				Attendance: 4,305

24 April 1971 Scottish First Division	Cowdenbeath	0–4	Hearts	Central Park
				Attendance: 1,875

== See also ==
- List of Heart of Midlothian F.C. seasons
