= 1972–73 Heart of Midlothian F.C. season =

Heart of Midlothian
1972–73 season
- Manager: Bobby Seith
- Stadium: Tynecastle Park
- Scottish First Division: 10th
- Scottish Cup: 3rd round
- League Cup: Group Stage
- Texaco Cup: Quarter-finalists

During the 1972–73 season, Heart of Midlothian F.C. competed in the Scottish First Division, the Scottish Cup, the Scottish League Cup, the Texaco Cup and the East of Scotland Shield.

== Squad ==
Note: Flags indicate national team as defined under FIFA eligibility rules; some limited exceptions apply. Players may hold more than one non-FIFA nationality.

No.	Pos.	Nation	Player
—	GK	SCO	Jim Cruickshank
—	GK	SCO	Kenny Garland
—	DF	SCO	Jim Jefferies
—	DF	SCO	Roy Kay
—	DF	SCO	David Clunie
—	DF	SCO	Jim Brown
—	DF	SCO	Alan Anderson
—	DF	SCO	Andy Lynch
—	DF	SCO	Ian Sneddon
—	DF	SCO	Peter Oliver
—	DF	SCO	Eddie Thomson
—	DF	SCO	Arthur Thomson
—	DF	SCO	George Wood

No.	Pos.	Nation	Player
—	DF	SCO	John Gallacher
—	DF	SCO	Jim Jefferies
—	MF	SCO	Neil Murray
—	MF	SCO	Wilson Wood
—	MF	SCO	Tommy Murray
—	MF	SCO	Donald Park
—	MF	SCO	Kenny Aird
—	MF	AUS	Jimmy Cant
—	MF	SCO	Willie Menmuir
—	MF	SCO	Derek Renton
—	MF	AUS	John Stevenson
—	FW	SCO	Donald Ford
—	FW	SCO	Eric Carruthers
—	FW	SCO	Harry Kinnear

== Fixtures ==
=== Friendlies ===
29 July 1972 Friendly	Den Haag	0–1	Hearts	Zuiderpark Stadion
	Goal

2 August 1972 Friendly	AZ Alkmaar	0–1	Hearts	Alkmaarderhout
	Goal

6 August 1972 Friendly	Sparta Rotterdam	1–0	Hearts	Het Kasteel
	Goal

7 August 1972 Friendly	Hearts	2–1	Den Haag	Tynecastle Park
	Goal

20 March 1973 Friendly	Brechin City	0–3	Hearts	Glebe Park
	Goal

4 May 1973 Friendly	Orkney Select	0–2	Hearts	Bignold Park
	Goal

5 May 1973 Friendly	Orkney Select	2–8	Hearts	Bignold Park
	Goal

=== Texaco Cup ===
13 September 1972 Texaco Cup 1st Round 1st Leg	Hearts	1–0	Crystal Palace	Tynecastle Park
			Goal

26 September 1972 Texaco Cup 1st Round 2nd Leg	Crystal Palace	0–1	Hearts	Selhurst Park
			Goal

16 October 1972 Texaco Cup Quarter-Final 1st Leg	Hearts	0–0	Motherwell	Tynecastle Park
			Goal

8 November 1972 Texaco Cup Quarter-Final 2nd Leg	Motherwell	4–2	Hearts	Fir Park
			Goal

=== League Cup ===
12 August 1972 League Cup Group	Dumbarton	1–0	Hearts	Boghead Park
				Attendance: 7,058

16 August 1972 League Cup Group	Hearts	0–0	Airdrieonians	Tynecastle Park
				Attendance: 7,360

19 August 1972 League Cup Group	Berwick Rangers	1–1	Hearts	Shielfield Park
				Attendance: 4,135

23 August 1972 League Cup Group	Airdrieonians	2–1	Hearts	Broomfield Park
				Attendance: 4,326

26 August 1972 League Cup Group	Hearts	1–1	Dumbarton	Tynecastle Park
				Attendance: 7,328

30 August 1972 League Cup Group	Hearts	3–0	Berwick Rangers	Tynecastle Park
				Attendance: 3,726

=== Scottish Cup ===
3 February 1973 Scottish Cup R3	Hearts	0–0	Airdrieonians	Tynecastle Park
				Attendance: 8,217

7 February 1973 Scottish Cup R3 Replay	Airdrieonians	3–1	Hearts	Broomfield Park
				Attendance: 10,000

=== Scottish First Division ===
2 September 1972 Scottish First Division	Hearts	1–0	St Johnstone	Tynecastle Park
				Attendance: 7,137

9 September 1972 Scottish First Division	Hibernian	2–0	Hearts	Easter Road
				Attendance: 21,221

16 September 1972 Scottish First Division	Hearts	1–0	Dumbarton	Tynecastle Park
				Attendance: 6,250

23 September 1972 Scottish First Division	Morton	2–4	Hearts	Cappielow Park
				Attendance: 41,000

30 September 1972 Scottish First Division	East Fife	1–0	Hearts	Bayview Park
				Attendance: 6,192

7 October 1972 Scottish First Division	Hearts	2–1	Aberdeen	Tynecastle Park
				Attendance: 12,438

14 October 1972 Scottish First Division	Dundee United	3–2	Hearts	Tannadice Park
				Attendance: 8,269

21 October 1972 Scottish First Division	Hearts	0–0	Motherwell	Tynecastle Park
				Attendance: 6,795

28 October 1972 Scottish First Division	Hearts	3–0	Arbroath	Tynecastle Park
				Attendance: 6,795

4 November 1972 Scottish First Division	Falkirk	1–3	Hearts	Brockville Park
				Attendance: 7,365

11 November 1972 Scottish First Division	Hearts	3–0	Ayr United	Tynecastle Park
				Attendance: 6,092

18 November 1972 Scottish First Division	Celtic	3–1	Hearts	Celtic Park
				Attendance: 27,451

25 November 1972 Scottish First Division	Hearts	2–0	Partick Thistle	Tynecastle Park
				Attendance: 7,571

2 December 1972 Scottish First Division	Rangers	0–1	Hearts	Ibrox Park
				Attendance: 27,350

9 December 1972 Scottish First Division	Hearts	0–0	Kilmarnock	Tynecastle Park
				Attendance: 6,568

16 December 1972 Scottish First Division	Airdrieonians	0–2	Hearts	Broomfield Park
				Attendance: 3,708

23 December 1972 Scottish First Division	Hearts	1–2	Dundee	Tynecastle Park
				Attendance: 8,366

30 December 1972 Scottish First Division	St Johnstone	3–1	Hearts	Easter Road
				Attendance: 35,393

1 January 1973 Scottish First Division	Hearts	0–7	Hibernian	Tynecastle Park
				Attendance: 35,989

6 January 1973 Scottish First Division	Dumbarton	0–2	Hearts	Boghead Park
				Attendance: 4,884

20 January 1973 Scottish First Division	Hearts	1–1	East Fife	Tynecastle Park
				Attendance: 5,625

27 January 1973 Scottish First Division	Aberdeen	3–1	Hearts	Pittodrie Stadium
				Attendance: 14,140

10 February 1973 Scottish First Division	Hearts	0–2	Dundee United	Tynecastle Park
				Attendance: 4,831

19 February 1973 Scottish First Division	Motherwell	2–2	Hearts	Fir Park
				Attendance: 4,773

3 March 1973 Scottish First Division	Arbroath	3–0	Hearts	Gayfield Park
				Attendance: 3,416

10 March 1973 Scottish First Division	Hearts	1–0	Falkirk	Tynecastle Park
				Attendance: 5,773

12 March 1973 Scottish First Division	Hearts	0–0	Morton	Tynecastle Park
				Attendance: 6,847

21 March 1973 Scottish First Division	Ayr United	2–0	Hearts	Somerset Park
				Attendance: 7,303

24 March 1973 Scottish First Division	Hearts	0–2	Celtic	Tynecastle Park
				Attendance: 21,630

31 March 1973 Scottish First Division	Partick Thistle	3–0	Hearts	Firhill Park
				Attendance: 6,128

7 April 1973 Scottish First Division	Hearts	0–1	Rangers	Tynecastle Park
				Attendance: 23,331

14 April 1973 Scottish First Division	Kilmarnock	2–1	Hearts	Rugby Park
				Attendance: 4,036

21 April 1973 Scottish First Division	Hearts	0–1	Airdrieonians	Tynecastle Park
				Attendance: 4,328

28 April 1973 Scottish First Division	Dundee	2–2	Heart of Midlothian	Dens Park
				Attendance: 6,348

== See also ==
- List of Heart of Midlothian F.C. seasons
