= 1971–72 Heart of Midlothian F.C. season =

Heart of Midlothian
1971–72 season
- Manager: Bobby Seith
- Stadium: Tynecastle Park
- Scottish First Division: 6th
- Scottish Cup: 5th Round
- League Cup: Group Stage
- Texaco Cup: 1st Round

During the 1971–72 season, Heart of Midlothian F.C. competed in the Scottish First Division, the Scottish Cup, the Scottish League Cup and the Texaco Cup.

== Squad ==
Note: Flags indicate national team as defined under FIFA eligibility rules; some limited exceptions apply. Players may hold more than one non-FIFA nationality.

No.	Pos.	Nation	Player
—	GK	SCO	Jim Cruickshank
—	GK	SCO	Kenny Garland
—	DF	SCO	Jim Jefferies
—	DF	SCO	Roy Kay
—	DF	SCO	David Clunie
—	DF	SCO	Jim Brown
—	DF	SCO	Alan Anderson
—	DF	SCO	Andy Lynch
—	DF	SCO	Ian Sneddon
—	DF	SCO	Peter Oliver
—	DF	SCO	Eddie Thomson
—	DF	SCO	Arthur Thomson
—	DF	SCO	John Gallacher

No.	Pos.	Nation	Player
—	DF	SCO	Jim Jefferies
—	MF	SCO	George Fleming
—	MF	SCO	Jim Townsend
—	MF	SCO	Tommy Veitch
—	MF	SCO	Neil Murray
—	MF	SCO	Wilson Wood
—	MF	SCO	Tommy Murray
—	MF	AUS	Jimmy Cant
—	MF	SCO	Derek Renton
—	FW	SCO	Donald Ford
—	FW	SCO	Ernie Winchester
—	FW	SCO	Eric Carruthers
—	FW	SCO	Harry Kinnear

== Fixtures ==
=== Friendlies ===
31 July 1971 Friendly	Queen of the South	0–2	Hearts	Palmerston Park
	Goal

7 August 1971 Friendly	Hearts	2–1	Tottenham Hotspur	Tynecastle Park
	Goal

2 November 1971 Friendly	Carlisle United	3–2	Hearts	Brunton Park
	Goal

24 November 1971 Friendly	Hearts	2–1	Gornik Zabrze	Tynecastle Park
	Goal

1 May 1972 Friendly	Ross County	2–1	Hearts	Victoria Park
	Goal

=== Texaco Cup ===
15 September 1971 Texaco Cup 1st Round 1st Leg	Hearts	1–0	Newcastle United	Tynecastle Park
			Goal

28 September 1971 Texaco Cup 1st Round 2nd Leg	Newcastle United	2–1	Hearts	St James' Park
			Goal

=== League Cup ===
14 August 1971 League Cup Group	Hearts	1–0	St Johnstone	Boghead Park
				Attendance: 11,242

18 August 1971 League Cup Group	Airdrieonians	1–3	Hearts	Broomfield Park
				Attendance: 6,573

21 August 1971 League Cup Group	Dunfermline Athletic	1–0	Hearts	East End Park
				Attendance: 12,553

25 August 1971 League Cup Group	Hearts	1–2	Airdrieonians	Tynecastle Park
				Attendance: 10,469

28 August 1971 League Cup Group	St Johnstone	1–0	Hearts	Muirton Park
				Attendance: 8,027

1 September 1971 League Cup Group	Hearts	4–0	Dunfermline Athletic	Tynecastle Park
				Attendance: 5,197

=== Scottish Cup ===
5 February 1972 Scottish Cup R3	Hearts	2–0	St Johnstone	Tynecastle Park
				Attendance: 12,431

26 February 1972 Scottish Cup R4	Hearts	4–0	Celtic	Tynecastle Park
				Attendance: 11,953

18 March 1972 Scottish Cup R5	Celtic	1–1	Hearts	Celtic Park
				Attendance: 47,500

27 March 1972 Scottish Cup R5 Replay	Hearts	0–1	Celtic	Tynecastle Park
				Attendance: 40,029

=== Scottish First Division ===
4 September 1971 Scottish First Division	Hearts	0–2	Hibernian	Tynecastle Park
				Attendance: 26,671

11 September 1971 Scottish First Division	Dunfermline Athletic	1–4	Hearts	East End Park
				Attendance: 8,354

18 September 1971 Scottish First Division	Hearts	2–1	St Johnstone	Tynecastle Park
				Attendance: 10,025

25 September 1971 Scottish First Division	Dundee	0–0	Hearts	Dens Park
				Attendance: 10,185

2 October 1971 Scottish First Division	Hearts	2–1	Rangers	Tynecastle Park
				Attendance: 28,512

9 October 1971 Scottish First Division	Clyde	0–1	Hearts	Shawfield Stadium
				Attendance: 3,656

16 October 1971 Scottish First Division	Hearts	1–1	Airdrieonians	Tynecastle Park
				Attendance: 10,188

23 October 1971 Scottish First Division	Kilmarnock	2–2	Hearts	Rugby Park
				Attendance: 4,536

30 October 1971 Scottish First Division	Hearts	1–1	East Fife	Tynecastle Park
				Attendance: 8,932

6 November 1971 Scottish First Division	Motherwell	5–3	Hearts	Fir Park
				Attendance: 5,449

13 November 1971 Scottish First Division	Hearts	6–1	Morton	Tynecastle Park
				Attendance: 6,092

20 November 1971 Scottish First Division	Hearts	1–0	Ayr United	Tynecastle Park
				Attendance: 8,414

27 November 1971 Scottish First Division	Aberdeen	2–3	Hearts	Pittodrie Stadium
				Attendance: 20,702

4 December 1971 Scottish First Division	Hearts	3–2	Dundee United	Tynecastle Park
				Attendance: 9,391

11 December 1971 Scottish First Division	Falkirk	2–0	Hearts	Brockville Park
				Attendance: 7,210

18 December 1971 Scottish First Division	Hearts	0–0	Partick Thistle	Tynecastle Park
				Attendance: 10,554

25 December 1971 Scottish First Division	Celtic	3–2	Hearts	Celtic Park
				Attendance: 32,880

1 January 1972 Scottish First Division	Hibernian	0–0	Hearts	Easter Road
				Attendance: 36,046

3 January 1972 Scottish First Division	Hearts	1–1	Dunfermline Athletic	Tynecastle Park
				Attendance: 12,872

8 January 1972 Scottish First Division	St Johnstone	1–1	Hearts	Muirton Park
				Attendance: 5,536

15 January 1972 Scottish First Division	Hearts	2–5	Dundee	Tynecastle Park
				Attendance: 8,667

22 January 1972 Scottish First Division	Rangers	6–0	Hearts	Ibrox Park
				Attendance: 29,776

29 January 1972 Scottish First Division	Hearts	2–0	Clyde	Tynecastle Park
				Attendance: 6,267

12 February 1972 Scottish First Division	Airdrieonians	1–1	Hearts	Broomfield Park
				Attendance: 5,078

19 February 1972 Scottish First Division	Hearts	2–1	Kilmarnock	Tynecastle Park
				Attendance: 8,503

4 March 1972 Scottish First Division	East Fife	2–2	Hearts	Bayview Park
				Attendance: 5,915

11 March 1972 Scottish First Division	Hearts	0–0	Motherwell	Tynecastle Park
				Attendance: 8,411

21 March 1972 Scottish First Division	Morton	1–1	Hearts	Cappielow Park
				Attendance: 3,407

25 March 1972 Scottish First Division	Ayr United	1–0	Hearts	Somerset Park
				Attendance: 6,347

1 April 1972 Scottish First Division	Hearts	1–0	Aberdeen	Tynecastle Park
				Attendance: 8,106

8 April 1972 Scottish First Division	Dundee United	3–2	Hearts	Tannadice Park
				Attendance: 4,550

15 April 1972 Scottish First Division	Hearts	1–0	Falkirk	Tynecastle Park
				Attendance: 6,470

22 April 1972 Scottish First Division	Partick Thistle	2–2	Hearts	Firhill Park
				Attendance: 4,748

29 April 1972 Scottish First Division	Hearts	4–1	Celtic	Tynecastle Park
				Attendance: 10,124

== See also ==
- List of Heart of Midlothian F.C. seasons
