= 1968 Scottish Cup final =

1968 Scottish Cup Final
- Event: 1967–68 Scottish Cup
Dunfermline Athletic	Heart of Midlothian
3	1
- Date: 27 April 1968
- Venue: Hampden Park, Glasgow
- Referee: Willie Anderson
- Attendance: 56,366

The 1968 Scottish Cup Final was played on 27 April 1968 at Hampden Park in Glasgow and was the final of the 83rd staging of the Scottish Cup. Dunfermline Athletic and Hearts contested the match. Dunfermline Athletic won the match 3–1 with goals from two goals from Pat Gardner and a goal from Ian Lister, Hearts got on the scoresheet through a John Lunn own goal.

The game was Dunfermline's second and most recent Scottish cup triumph.

Hearts had the bulk of the play in the first half but were unable to press home their advantage, so the first half finished goalless. In the second half Dunfermline came out strongly, attacking down the wings and troubling Hearts' defence. Dunfermline went ahead in the 56th minute with a goal from Gardner. Three minutes later Hearts goalkeeper Cruickshank pulled down Paton, Lister scored the penalty to make it 2-0. Five minutes later Hearts replaced Jensen with Moller, this paid dividends as soon after Moller's cross was deflected into the box by Dunfermline's Lunn to make it 2-1. However, Hearts' revival was short-lived as Gardner scored a goal in the 73rd minute to make it 3-1.

== Final ==
27 April 1968

Dunfermline Athletic	3 – 1	Heart of Midlothian
Pat Gardner; Ian Lister (pen.)	Report (Page 10)	John Lunn (o.g.)

Hampden Park, Glasgow
Attendance: 56,366
Referee: Willie Anderson

=== Teams ===
DUNFERMLINE ATHLETIC:
GK	(Denmark) Bent Martin
DF	(Scotland) Willie Callaghan
DF	(Scotland) John McGarty
DF	(Scotland) Roy Barry (c)
DF	(Scotland) John Lunn
MF	(Scotland) Ian Lister
MF	(Scotland) Tommy Callaghan
MF	(Scotland) Hugh Robertson
MF	(Scotland) Alex Edwards
FW	(Scotland) Pat Gardner
FW	(Scotland) Bert Paton
Substitutes:
?
Manager:
(Scotland) George Farm

HEARTS:
GK	(Scotland) Jim Cruickshank
DF	(Scotland) Ian Sneddon
DF	(Scotland) Alan Anderson
DF	(Scotland) Eddie Thomson
DF	(Scotland) Arthur Mann
MF	(Norway) Roald Jensen	(substituted off) ?'
MF	(Scotland) George Miller (c)
MF	(Scotland) Jim Townsend
MF	(Scotland) Tommy Traynor
FW	(Scotland) Donald Ford
FW	(Scotland) Jim Irvine
Substitutes:
FW	(Denmark) Rene Moller	(substituted on) ?'
Manager:
(Scotland) John Harvey
