= 1972–73 Celtic F.C. season =

Celtic
1972–73 season
- Manager: Jock Stein
- Stadium: Celtic Park
- Scottish Division One: 1st
- Scottish Cup: Finalists
- Scottish League Cup: Finalists
- European Cup: 2nd round
- Drybrough Cup: Finalists

During the 1972–73 Scottish football season, Celtic competed in Scottish Division One. Celtic were league champions for the 8th time in a row, a record at the time, by just one point, achieving their 28th Scottish league and 58th major honour.

This was the only season in their nine-in-a-row run in which Celtic failed to achieve any other major domestic honour; in the other eight seasons they would achieve either the Scottish Cup, the Scottish League Cup, or both. They lost the Scottish Cup Final 2-3 to Rangers and the League Cup final 1-2 to Hibernian.

In the European Cup, they were eliminated 2-4 on aggregate by Hungarian champions Ujpesti Dozsa in the second round, having previously beaten Norwegian champions Rosenborg BK 5-2 on aggregate.

== Squad ==
Note: Flags indicate national team as defined under FIFA eligibility rules; some limited exceptions apply. Players may hold more than one non-FIFA nationality.

No.	Pos.	Nation	Player
—	GK	SCO	Evan Williams
—	GK	SCO	Denis Connaghan
—	GK	SCO	Ally Hunter
—	GK	SCO	Neil Carr
—	DF	SCO	Billy McNeill
—	DF	SCO	Jim Brogan
—	DF	SCO	Jimmy Quinn
—	DF	SCO	Danny McGrain
—	DF	SCO	Andy Lynch
—	DF	SCO	Pat McCluskey
—	MF	SCO	Bobby Murdoch
—	MF	SCO	David Hay
—	MF	SCO	George Connelly

No.	Pos.	Nation	Player
—	MF	SCO	Lou Macari
—	MF	SCO	Tommy Callaghan
—	MF	SCO	Vic Davidson
—	MF	SCO	Brian McLaughlin
—	MF	SCO	Billy Mitchell
—	FW	SCO	Jimmy Johnstone
—	FW	SCO	Bobby Lennox
—	FW	SCO	Harry Hood
—	FW	SCO	Kenny Dalglish
—	FW	SCO	Dixie Deans
—	FW	SCO	Paul Wilson
—	FW	ENG	Steve Hancock

== Competitions ==
=== Scottish Division One ===
==== League table ====
Pos	Team	Pld	W	D	L	GF	GA	GD	Pts	Qualification or relegation
1	Celtic	34	26	5	3	93	28	+65	57	Champion
2	Rangers	34	26	4	4	74	30	+44	56	
3	Hibernian	34	19	7	8	74	33	+41	45	
4	Aberdeen	34	16	11	7	61	34	+27	43	
5	Dundee	34	17	9	8	68	43	+25	43	

Source: Soccerbase and League Tables

==== Matches ====
2 September 1972 Division One	Celtic	6–2	Kilmarnock	Glasgow
19:00				Stadium: Hampden Park; Attendance: 11,661

9 September 1972 Division One	Morton	0–2	Celtic	Greenock
15:00				Stadium: Cappielow Park; Attendance: 11,723

16 September 1972 Division One	Celtic	3–1	Rangers	Glasgow
12:00				Stadium: Hampden Park; Attendance: 50,316

23 September 1972 Division One	Dundee	2–0	Celtic	Dundee
15:00				Stadium: Dens Park; Attendance: 18,226

30 September 1972 Division One	Celtic	1–0	Ayr United	Glasgow
15:00 BST				Stadium: Celtic Park; Attendance: 28,863

7 October 1972 Division One	Celtic	1–1	Airdrieonians	Glasgow
15:00 BST				Stadium: Celtic Park; Attendance: 20,262

14 October 1972 Division One	Partick Thistle	0–4	Celtic	Glasgow
15:00 BST				Stadium: Firhill Park; Attendance: 26,415

21 October 1972 Division One	Celtic	3–0	East Fife	Glasgow
15:00 BST				Stadium: Celtic Park; Attendance: 18,918

28 October 1972 Division One	Aberdeen	2–3	Celtic	Aberdeen
15:00 BST				Stadium: Pittodrie Stadium; Attendance: 32,524

4 November 1972 Division One	Celtic	3–1	Dundee United	Glasgow
15:00 BST				Stadium: Celtic Park; Attendance: 30,892

11 November 1972 Division One	Motherwell	0–5	Celtic	Motherwell
15:00 GMT				Stadium: Fir Park; Attendance: 12,439

18 November 1972 Division One	Celtic	4–2	Heart of Midlothian	Glasgow
15:00 GMT				Stadium: Celtic Park; Attendance: 27,451

25 November 1972 Division One	Falkirk	2–3	Celtic	Falkirk
15:00 GMT				Stadium: Brockville Park; Attendance: 12,579

2 December 1972 Division One	Dumbarton	1–6	Celtic	Dumbarton
15:00 GMT				Stadium: Boghead Park; Attendance: 14,488

16 December 1972 Division One	Arbroath	1–2	Celtic	Arbroath
15:00 GMT				Stadium: Gayfield Park; Attendance: 5,481

23 December 1972 Division One	Celtic	1–1	Hibernian	Glasgow
15:00 GMT				Stadium: Celtic Park; Attendance: 42,343

6 January 1973 Division One	Rangers	2–1	Celtic	Glasgow
15:00 GMT				Stadium: Ibrox Park; Attendance: 67,580

13 January 1973 Division One	Celtic	2–1	Dundee	Glasgow
15:00 GMT				Stadium: Celtic Park; Attendance: 25,977

20 January 1973 Division One	Ayr United	1–3	Celtic	Ayr
15:00 GMT				Stadium: Somerset Park; Attendance: 11,382

27 January 1973 Division One	Airdrieonians	2–1	Celtic	Airdrie
15:00 GMT				Stadium: Broomfield Park; Attendance: 15,589

7 February 1973 Division One	Kilmarnock	0–4	Celtic	Kilmarnock
19:30 GMT				Stadium: Rugby Park; Attendance: 11,185

10 February 1973 Division One	Celtic	1–1	Partick Thistle	Glasgow
15:00 GMT				Stadium: Celtic Park; Attendance: 31,415

17 February 1973 Division One	East Fife	2–2	Celtic	Methil
15:00 GMT				Stadium: Bayview Park; Attendance: 11,577

28 February 1973 Division One	Celtic	4–0	St Johnstone	Glasgow
19:30 GMT				Stadium: Celtic Park; Attendance: 17,403

3 March 1973 Division One	Celtic	2–0	Aberdeen	Glasgow
15:00 GMT				Stadium: Celtic Park; Attendance: 37,102

6 March 1973 Division One	Celtic	1–0	Morton	Glasgow
19:30 GMT				Stadium: Celtic Park; Attendance: 22,118

10 March 1973 Division One	Dundee United	2–2	Celtic	Dundee
15:00 GMT				Stadium: Tannadice Park; Attendance: 17,761

24 March 1973 Division One	Hearts	0–2	Celtic	Edinburgh
15:00 GMT				Stadium: Tynecastle Park; Attendance: 21,630

31 March 1973 Division One	Celtic	4–0	Falkirk	Glasgow
15:00 GMT				Stadium: Celtic Park; Attendance: 17,842

3 April 1973 Division One	Celtic	2–0	Motherwell	Glasgow
19:30 GMT				Stadium: Celtic Park; Attendance: 21,344

14 April 1973 Division One	St Johnstone	1–3	Celtic	Perth
15:00 BST				Stadium: Muirton Park; Attendance: 14,278

18 April 1973 Division One	Celtic	5–0	Dumbarton	Glasgow
19:30 BST				Stadium: Celtic Park; Attendance: 26,616

21 April 1973 Division One	Celtic	4–0	Arbroath	Glasgow
15:00 BST				Stadium: Celtic Park; Attendance: 26,780

28 April 1973 Division One	Hibernian	0–3	Celtic	Edinburgh
19:30 BST				Stadium: Easter Road; Attendance: 45,443

=== Scottish Cup ===
3 February 1973 Third round	Celtic	4–1	East Fife	Glasgow
15:00 GMT				Stadium: Celtic Park; Attendance: 25,000

24 February 1973 Fourth round	Motherwell	0–4	Celtic	Motherwell
15:00 GMT				Stadium: Fir Park; Attendance: 24,764

17 March 1973 Fifth round	Celtic	0–0	Aberdeen	Glasgow
15:00 GMT				Stadium: Celtic Park; Attendance: 40,032

21 March 1973 Fifth round replay	Aberdeen	0–1	Celtic	Aberdeen
19:30 GMT				Stadium: Pittodrie Stadium; Attendance: 33,465

7 April 1973 Semi-final	Celtic	0–0	Dundee	Glasgow
15:00 GMT				Stadium: Hampden Park; Attendance: 53,428

11 April 1973 Semi-final replay	Celtic	3–0 (aet)	Dundee	Glasgow
19:30 GMT				Stadium: Hampden Park; Attendance: 47,409

5 May 1973 Final	Celtic	2–3	Rangers	Glasgow
15:00 GMT				Stadium: Hampden Park; Attendance: 122,714

=== Scottish League Cup ===
12 August 1972 Group 8	Stirling Albion	0–3	Celtic	Stirling
15:00 GMT				Stadium: Annfield; Attendance: 10,565

16 August 1972 Group 8	Celtic	1–1	East Fife	Glasgow
19:30 GMT				Stadium: Celtic Park; Attendance: 14,379

19 August 1972 Group 8	Arbroath	0–5	Celtic	Arbroath
15:00 GMT				Stadium: Gayfield Park; Attendance: 8,834

23 August 1972 Group 8	East Fife	2–3	Celtic	Methil
19:30 GMT				Stadium: Bayview Park; Attendance: 9,152

26 August 1972 Group 8	Celtic	3–0	Stirling Albion	Glasgow
15:00 GMT				Stadium: Celtic Park; Attendance: 16,019

28 August 1972 Group 8	Celtic	3–3	Arbroath	Glasgow
19:30 GMT				Stadium: Hampden Park; Attendance: 4,914

20 September 1972 Second round 1st leg	Stranraer	1–2	Celtic	Stranraer
17:30 GMT				Stadium: Stair Park; Attendance: 5,260

4 October 1972 Second round 2nd leg	Celtic	5–2 (7–3 agg.)	Stranraer	Glasgow
19:30 GMT				Stadium: Celtic Park; Attendance: 7,483

11 October 1972 Quarter-final 1st leg	Dundee	1–0	Celtic	Dundee
19:30 GMT				Stadium: Dens Park; Attendance: 4,492

1 November 1972 Quarter-final 2nd leg	Celtic	3–2 (3–3 agg.)	Dundee	Glasgow
19:30 GMT				Stadium: Celtic Park; Attendance: 36,416

20 November 1972 Quarter-final replay	Celtic	4–1	Dundee	Glasgow
19:30 GMT				Stadium: Hampden Park; Attendance: 21,938

27 November 1972 Semi-final	Aberdeen	2–3	Celtic	Glasgow
19:30 GMT				Stadium: Hampden Park; Attendance: 39,582

9 December 1972 Final	Hibernian	2–1	Celtic	Glasgow
15:00 GMT				Stadium: Hampden Park; Attendance: 71,696

=== European Cup ===
13 September 1972 1st round 1st leg	Celtic (Scotland)	2–1	(Norway) Rosenborg BK	Glasgow
19:30 GMT				Stadium: Hampden Park; Attendance: 18,703

27 September 1972 1st round 2nd leg	Rosenborg BK (Norway)	1–3 (2–5 agg.)	(Scotland) Celtic	Trondheim
20:00 GMT				Stadium: Lerkendal Stadion; Attendance: 16,153

25 October 1972 2nd round 1st leg	Celtic (Scotland)	2–1	(Hungary) Ujpesti Dozsa	Glasgow
20:00 GMT				Stadium: Celtic Park; Attendance: 51,515

8 November 1972 2nd round 2nd leg	Ujpesti Dozsa (Hungary)	3–0 (4–2 agg.)	(Scotland) Celtic	Újpest
16:00 GMT				Stadium: Megyeri úti Stadium; Attendance: 13,012

=== Drybrough Cup ===
29 July 1972 First round	Celtic	2–1	Dumbarton	Glasgow
15:00 BST				Stadium: Celtic Park; Attendance: 28,000

2 August 1972 Semi-final	Celtic	3–2 (aet)	Aberdeen	Glasgow
19:30 BST				Stadium: Celtic Park; Attendance: 40,000

5 August 1972 Final	Celtic	3–5 (aet)	Hibernian	Glasgow
15:00 BST				Stadium: Hampden Park; Attendance: 49,462

== See also ==
- Nine in a row
