= 1969–70 Celtic F.C. season =

Celtic
1969–70 season
- Manager: Jock Stein
- Stadium: Celtic Park
- Scottish Division One: 1st
- Scottish Cup: Finalists
- Scottish League Cup: Winners
- European Cup: Finalists

During the 1969–70 Scottish football season, Celtic competed in Scottish Division One. They won the League for the fifth season in a row. They also won the League Cup for the fifth time in a row, something that has never been achieved again as of 2026.

Celtic had one of their most successful European campaigns as they reached the European Cup final for the second time, only to lose 2-1 to Dutch champions Feyenoord. The final was played at the San Siro in Milan, coincidentally the home of Internazionale, the team Celtic had beaten in Lisbon in the 1967 final. Celtic had to go through Swiss champions FC Basel, Portuguese champions Benfica, Italian champions Fiorentina and English champions Leeds United to reach the final.

Wim Jansen, who would manage Celtic decades later in 1997-98 to win a League and League Cup double and deny Rangers their tenth league title in a row, was part of the Feyenoord eleven that defeated Celtic in the final.

== Squad ==
Note: Flags indicate national team as defined under FIFA eligibility rules; some limited exceptions apply. Players may hold more than one non-FIFA nationality.

No.	Pos.	Nation	Player
—	GK	SCO	John Fallon
—	GK	SCO	Ronnie Simpson
—	GK	SCO	Evan Williams
—	DF	SCO	Jim Craig
—	DF	SCO	Tommy Gemmell
—	DF	SCO	Davie Cattanach
—	DF	SCO	Billy McNeill
—	DF	SCO	Jim Brogan
—	DF	SCO	Jimmy Quinn
—	DF	IRL	Jackie Clarke
—	MF	SCO	Bobby Murdoch
—	MF	SCO	David Hay
—	MF	SCO	John Clark

No.	Pos.	Nation	Player
—	MF	SCO	George Connelly
—	MF	SCO	Lou Macari
—	MF	SCO	Tommy Callaghan
—	MF	SCO	Bertie Auld
—	MF	SCO	Vic Davidson
—	MF	IRL	Charlie Gallacher
—	FW	SCO	Jimmy Johnstone
—	FW	SCO	Stevie Chalmers
—	FW	SCO	Willie Wallace
—	FW	SCO	Bobby Lennox
—	FW	SCO	Harry Hood
—	FW	SCO	John Yogi Hughes
—	FW	SCO	Kenny Dalglish

== Competitions ==
=== Scottish Division One ===
==== League table ====
Pos	Team	Pld	W	D	L	GF	GA	GD	Pts
1	Celtic	34	27	3	4	96	33	+63	57
2	Rangers	34	19	7	8	67	40	+27	45
3	Hibernian	34	19	6	9	65	40	+25	44
4	Heart of Midlothian	34	13	12	9	50	36	+14	38
5	Dundee United	34	16	6	12	62	64	−2	38

Source: "1969-1970 First Division - SPFL Archive". SPFL.

==== Matches ====
30 August 1969 Division One	Celtic	2–2	St Johnstone	Glasgow
15:00				Stadium: Celtic Park; Attendance: 56,926

3 September 1969 Division One	Kilmarnock	2–4	Celtic	Kilmarnock
19:30				Stadium: Rugby Park; Attendance: 23,821

6 September 1969 Division One	Dunfermline Athletic	2–1	Celtic	Dunfermline
15:00				Stadium: East End Park; Attendance: 23,366

13 September 1969 Division One	Celtic	1–2	Hibernian	Glasgow
15:00				Stadium: Celtic Park; Attendance: 42,706

20 September 1969 Division One	Rangers	0–1	Celtic	Glasgow
15:00 BST				Stadium: Ibrox Park; Attendance: 84,140

27 September 1969 Division One	Celtic	2–1	Clyde	Glasgow
15:00 BST				Stadium: Celtic Park; Attendance: 32,377

4 October 1969 Division One	Celtic	7–1	Raith Rovers	Glasgow
15:00 BST				Stadium: Celtic Park; Attendance: 29,933

11 October 1969 Division One	Airdrieonians	0–2	Celtic	Airdrie
15:00 BST				Stadium: Broomfield Park; Attendance: 17,244

29 October 1969 Division One	Aberdeen	2–3	Celtic	Aberdeen
19:30 BST				Stadium: Pittodrie Stadium; Attendance: 23,912

1 November 1969 Division One	Ayr United	2–4	Celtic	Ayr
15:00 BST				Stadium: Somerset Park; Attendance: 18,825

8 November 1969 Division One	Celtic	0–2	Hearts	Glasgow
15:00 GMT				Stadium: Celtic Park; Attendance: 32,683

15 November 1969 Division One	Motherwell	1–2	Celtic	Motherwell
15:00 GMT				Stadium: Fir Park; Attendance: 20,882

29 November 1969 Division One	Morton	0–3	Celtic	Greenock
15:00 GMT				Stadium: Cappielow Park; Attendance: 16,365

1 December 1969 Division One	Celtic	2–0	St Mirren	Glasgow
19:30 GMT				Stadium: Celtic Park; Attendance: 20,095

6 December 1969 Division One	Celtic	1–0	Dundee	Glasgow
15:00 GMT				Stadium: Celtic Park; Attendance: 26,835

13 December 1969 Division One	St Johnstone	1–4	Celtic	Perth
15:00 GMT				Stadium: Muirton Park; Attendance: 14,625

17 December 1969 Division One	Celtic	7–2	Dundee United	Glasgow
19:30 GMT				Stadium: Celtic Park; Attendance: 23,916

20 December 1969 Division One	Celtic	3–1	Kilmarnock	Glasgow
15:00 GMT				Stadium: Celtic Park; Attendance: 31,459

27 December 1969 Division One	Celtic	8–1	Partick Thistle	Glasgow
15:00 GMT				Stadium: Celtic Park; Attendance: 27,087

1 January 1970 Division One	Clyde	0–2	Celtic	Glasgow
14:00 GMT				Stadium: Shawfield Stadium; Attendance: 21,609

3 January 1970 Division One	Celtic	0–0	Rangers	Glasgow
15:00 GMT				Stadium: Celtic Park; Attendance: 72,265

17 January 1970 Division One	Hibernian	1–2	Celtic	Glasgow
15:00 GMT				Stadium: Celtic Park; Attendance: 40,839

31 January 1970 Division One	Celtic	3–1	Dunfermline Athletic	Glasgow
15:00 GMT				Stadium: Celtic Park; Attendance: 34,188

16 February 1970 Division One	Partick Thistle	1–5	Celtic	Glasgow
15:00 GMT				Stadium: Firhill Park; Attendance: 17,129

25 February 1970 Division One	Raith Rovers	0–2	Celtic	Kirkcaldy
19:30 GMT				Stadium: Stark's Park; Attendance: 8,724

28 February 1970 Division One	Celtic	4–2	Airdrieonians	Glasgow
15:00 GMT				Stadium: Celtic Park; Attendance: 29,706

7 March 1970 Division One	Dundee United	0–2	Celtic	Dundee
15:00 GMT				Stadium: Tannadice Park; Attendance: 19,532

10 March 1970 Division One	Celtic	4–0	Morton	Glasgow
19:30 GMT				Stadium: Celtic Park; Attendance: 19,120

21 March 1970 Division One	Celtic	3–0	Ayr United	Glasgow
15:00 GMT				Stadium: Celtic Park; Attendance: 25,055

25 March 1970 Division One	Celtic	1–2	Aberdeen	Glasgow
19:30 GMT				Stadium: Celtic Park; Attendance: 31,751

28 March 1970 Division One	Hearts	0–0	Celtic	Edinburgh
15:00 BST				Stadium: Tynecastle Park; Attendance: 27,690

4 April 1970 Division One	Celtic	6–1	Motherwell	Glasgow
15:00 BST				Stadium: Celtic Park; Attendance: 28,073

6 April 1970 Division One	Dundee	1–2	Celtic	Dundee
19:30 BST				Stadium: Dens Park; Attendance: 11,900

18 April 1970 Division One	St Mirren	2–3	Celtic	Paisley
15:00 BST				Stadium: St Mirren Park, Love Street; Attendance: 18,365

=== Scottish Cup ===
24 January 1970 First round	Celtic	2–1	Dunfermline Athletic	Glasgow
15:00 GMT				Stadium: Celtic Park; Attendance: 50,000

7 February 1970 Second round	Celtic	4–0	Dundee United	Glasgow
15:00 GMT				Stadium: Celtic Park; Attendance: 45,000

21 February 1970 Third round	Celtic	3–1	Rangers	Glasgow
15:00 GMT				Stadium: Celtic Park; Attendance: 75,000

14 March 1970 Semi-final	Celtic	2–1	Dundee	Glasgow
15:00 GMT				Stadium: Hampden Park; Attendance: 64,519

11 April 1970 Final	Celtic	1–3	Aberdeen	Glasgow
15:00 GMT				Stadium: Hampden Park; Attendance: 108,244

=== Scottish League Cup ===
9 August 1969 Group 8	Celtic	6–1	Airdrieonians	Glasgow
15:00 GMT				Stadium: Celtic Park; Attendance: 37,638

13 August 1969 Group 8	Rangers	2–1	Celtic	Glasgow
19:30 GMT				Stadium: Ibrox Park; Attendance: 71,645

16 August 1969 Group 8	Celtic	5–0	Raith Rovers	Glasgow
15:00 GMT				Stadium: Celtic Park; Attendance: 34,436

20 August 1969 Group 8	Celtic	1–0	Rangers	Glasgow
19:30 GMT				Stadium: Celtic Park; Attendance: 69,184

23 August 1969 Group 8	Airdireonians	0–3	Celtic	Airdrie
15:00 GMT				Stadium: Broomfield Park; Attendance: 21,347

27 August 1969 Group 8	Raith Rovers	2–5	Celtic	Kirkcaldy
19:30 GMT				Stadium: Stark's Park; Attendance: 17,133

10 September 1969 Quarter-final 1st leg	Aberdeen	0–0	Celtic	Aberdeen
19:30 GMT				Stadium: Pittodrie Stadium; Attendance: 31,684

24 September 1969 Quarter-final 2nd leg	Celtic	2–1 (2–1 agg.)	Aberdeen	Glasgow
19:45 GMT				Stadium: Celtic Park; Attendance: 45,140

8 October 1969 Semi-final	Ayr United	3–3	Celtic	Glasgow
19:30 GMT				Stadium: Hampden Park; Attendance: 35,037

13 October 1969 Semi-final replay	Ayr United	1–2	Celtic	Glasgow
19:30 GMT				Stadium: Hampden Park; Attendance: 47,821

25 October 1969 Final	St Johnstone	0–1	Celtic	Glasgow
15:00 GMT				Stadium: Hampden Park; Attendance: 73,067

=== European Cup ===
17 September 1969 1st round 1st leg	FC Basel (Switzerland)	0–0	(Scotland) Celtic	Basel
19:00 GMT				Stadium: St. Jakob Stadium; Attendance: 37,587

1 October 1969 1st round 2nd leg	Celtic (Scotland)	2–0 (2–0 agg.)	(Switzerland) FC Basel	Glasgow
20:00 GMT				Stadium: Celtic Park; Attendance: 49,976

12 November 1969 2nd round 1st leg	Celtic (Scotland)	3–0	(Portugal) Benfica	Glasgow
20:00 GMT				Stadium: Celtic Park; Attendance: 74,894

25 November 1969 2nd round 2nd leg	Benfica (Portugal)	3–0 (3–3 agg.)	(Scotland) Celtic	Lisbon
20:00 GMT				Stadium: Estádio da Luz; Attendance: 29,601

4 March 1970 Quarter-final 1st leg	Celtic (Scotland)	3–0	(Italy) Fiorentina	Glasgow
20:00 GMT				Stadium: Celtic Park; Attendance: 77,240

18 March 1970 Quarter-final 2nd leg	Fiorentina (Italy)	1–0 (1–3 agg.)	(Scotland) Celtic	Florence
20:00 GMT				Stadium: Stadio Comunale; Attendance: 35,544

1 April 1970 Semi-final 1st leg	Leeds United (England)	0–1	(Scotland) Celtic	Leeds
19:30 GMT				Stadium: Elland Road; Attendance: 45,505

15 April 1970 Semi-final 2nd leg	Celtic (Scotland)	2–1 (3–1 agg.)	(England) Leeds United	Glasgow
20:00 GMT				Stadium: Hampden Park; Attendance: 136,505

6 May 1970 Final	Feyenoord (Netherlands)	2–1	(Scotland) Celtic	Milan
19:30 GMT				Stadium: San Siro; Attendance: 45,505

=== Glasgow Cup ===
15 October 1969 Semi-final	Celtic	4–1	Clyde	Glasgow
19:30 BST				Stadium: Celtic Park; Attendance: 17,000

10 August 1970 Final	Rangers	1–3	Celtic	Glasgow
19:30 BST				Stadium: Hampden Park; Attendance: 58,144

== See also ==
- Nine in a row
