= Thomas Veitch =

Thomas Veitch may refer to:

- Tommy Veitch (1949–1987), Scottish professional footballer
- Tom Veitch (1941–2022), American writer
