= Eddie Thomson =

Scottish footballer & coach (1947–2003)

Personal information
- Full name: Edward Thomson
- Date of birth: 25 February 1947
- Place of birth: Rosewell, Scotland
- Date of death: 21 February 2003 (aged 55)
- Place of death: Sydney, Australia
- Position: Defender

Youth career
- Whitehill Welfare
- Penicuik Athletic

Senior career*
Years	Team	Apps	(Gls)
1966–1973	Heart of Midlothian	162	(4)
1973–1976	Aberdeen	91	(1)
1976	San Antonio Thunder	19	(3)
1977–1980	Sydney City	65	(2)
Total		337	(10)

International career
1969	Scottish Football League XI	1	(0)
1969–1970	Scotland U23	3	(0)

Managerial career
- 1980–1986: Sydney City
- 1986–1989: Sydney Olympic
- 1984: Australia B
- 1984–1988: Australia (Assistant coach)
- 1989–1990: Football Federation Australia (Coaching director)
- 1990–1996: Australia
- 1997–2000: Sanfrecce Hiroshima
Medal record
Men's football
Representing Australia (as manager)
OFC Nations Cup
Winner	1996
OFC U-23 Championship
Winner	1996
- * Club domestic league appearances and goals

Eddie Thomson (25 February 1947 – 21 February 2003) was a Scottish association football player and coach, who played as a defender. He played for Heart of Midlothian and Aberdeen in Scotland, San Antonio Thunder in the United States and Sydney City in Australia. Staying in Australia, he coached Sydney City and Sydney Olympic before working with the Australia national team. Initially assistant coach, he was subsequently head coach from 1990 to 1996. His last coaching position was with Sanfrecce Hiroshima in Japan.

== Career ==
Born in Rosewell, Scotland, he played 162 games for Heart of Midothian from 1966 to 1973, before moving to Aberdeen and playing a further 91 games with them. After a brief stint with the San Antonio Thunder of the NASL, he moved to Australia and Sydney City in 1977 for the inaugural National Soccer League season. He won two NSL championships with this side as a player, in 1977 and as a player-coach again in 1980. During his time at Hearts he also played for the Scottish u-23 side.

It was at this time he retired from playing and immediately became the full-time coach of Sydney City, winning a further two national championships in 1981 and 1982. He also won an NSL Cup trophy in 1986. After Sydney City withdrew from the NSL in 1987 he took charge of Sydney Olympic, guiding them to a grand final in 1989 before leaving early in the next season to take charge of the Australia national team.

His national coaching career did not start there however. He became coach of Australia B in 1984 before becoming assistant coach of the Socceroos in 1985. After taking over as Socceroos manager, he guided the team to some impressive friendly results against Sweden and the USA before coming close to qualifying for USA 94, only losing 1–0 as a result of a freak deflection to an Argentine side who had recalled Diego Maradona after some disappointing qualification results.

He was also coach of the Australian Olympic football team at the same time. In 1992, after defeating the Netherlands in a memorable encounter to qualify for the 1992 Summer Olympics, the team came within one game of the gold medal match, losing 6–1 to Poland before losing 1–0 to Ghana in the bronze medal playoff.

In 1994, after allegations of inappropriate involvement in player transfers, an inquiry, chaired by retired New South Wales judge Donald Stewart, was set up to investigate these claims. The report published recommended his sacking, but he stayed on in the end. Shortly after guiding the Olympic side through the 1996 Summer Olympics in which Australia failed to get past the group stage, Eddie resigned to take charge of Japanese side Sanfrecce Hiroshima. During his time there, a number of Australians, such as Aurelio Vidmar, Graham Arnold and Steve Corica also played there.

== Career statistics ==
Appearances and goals by club, season and competition
Club	Season	League			National Cup		League Cup		Europe		Total	
Club	Season	Division	Apps	Goals	Apps	Goals	Apps	Goals	Apps	Goals	Apps	Goals
Heart of Midlothian	1966–67	Scottish Division One	9	0	0	0	0	0	0	0	9	0
Heart of Midlothian	1967–68	Scottish Division One	9	1	5	1	3	0	0	0	17	1
Heart of Midlothian	1968–69	Scottish Division One	34	0	2	0	6	0	0	0	42	0
Heart of Midlothian	1969–70	Scottish Division One	23	0	2	0	0	0	0	0	25	0
Heart of Midlothian	1970–71	Scottish Division One	34	0	1	0	6	0	0	0	41	0
Heart of Midlothian	1971–72	Scottish Division One	29	2	4	0	6	1	0	0	39	3
Heart of Midlothian	1972–73	Scottish Division One	24	1	2	0	0	0	0	0	26	1
Heart of Midlothian	Total		162	4	16	1	21	1	0	0	199	6
Aberdeen	1972–73	Scottish Division One	7	0	0	0	0	0	0	0	7	0
Aberdeen	1973–74	Scottish Division One	32	1	1	0	10	0	4	0	47	1
Aberdeen	1974–75	Scottish Division One	17	0	4	0	4	1	0	0	25	1
Aberdeen	1975–76	Scottish Premier Division	28	0	1	0	2	0	0	0	31	0
Aberdeen	1976–77	Scottish Premier Division	7	0	0	0	4	0	0	0	11	0
Aberdeen	Total		91	1	6	0	20	1	4	0	121	2
San Antonio Thunder	1976	North American Soccer League	19	3	0	0	0	0	0	0	19	3
Sydney City	1977	National Soccer League	17	0	1	0	-	-	-	-	18	0
Sydney City	1978	National Soccer League	23	1	3	1	-	-	-	-	26	2
Sydney City	1979	National Soccer League	13	1	2	0	-	-	-	-	15	1
Sydney City	1980	National Soccer League	12	0	0	0	-	-	-	-	12	0
Sydney City	Total		65	2	6	1	-	-	-	-	71	3
Career total			337	10	28	2	41	2	4	0	410	14

== Managerial statistics ==
Team	From	To	Record				
Team	From	To	G	W	D	L	Win %
Sanfrecce Hiroshima	1997	2000	126	58	3	65	46.03%

== Honours ==
=== Player ===
Heart of Midlothian

- Scottish Cup runners-up: 1967–68

Sydney City

- National Soccer League: 1977, 1980

=== Manager ===
Sydney City

- National Soccer League: 1980, 1981, 1982
- NSL Northern Division: 1984, 1985
- NSL Cup: 1986
- NSL Charity Shield: 1982

Sydney Olympic

- National Soccer League runners-up: 1986
- NSL Premiership runners-up: 1986
- NSL Cup runners-up: 1989

Australia

- OFC Nations Cup: 1996
- Trans-Tasman Cup: 1991, 1995

Australia U23

- OFC U-23 Championship: 1996

Individual

- NSL Coach of the Year: 1981, 1984, 1985
- National Soccer Hall of Fame: 2002 Inductee

== Death ==
He returned to Australia in 2000 and shortly afterwards, he was diagnosed with non-Hodgkin lymphoma, which he died of in 2003.
