= Malcolm Ford =

Scottish cricketer (1936–1987)

Personal information
- Full name: James Malcolm Clark Ford
- Born: 29 December 1936; Edinburgh, Midlothian, Scotland
- Died: 13 April 1987 (aged 50); Polbeth, West Lothian, Scotland
- Batting: Left-handed
- Relatives: Alexander Ford (father)

Domestic team information
- Years: Team
- 1960–1966: Scotland

Career statistics
| Competition | First-class |
|---|---|
| Matches | 10 |
| Runs scored | 235 |
| Batting average | 18.07 |
| 100s/50s | –/1 |
| Top score | 50 |
| Catches/stumpings | 7/– |
- Source: Cricinfo

James Malcolm Clark Ford (29 December 1936 — 13 April 1987) was a Scottish first-class cricketer.

The son of the cricketer Alexander Ford, he was born in Edinburgh in December 1936. He was educated at the Edinburgh Academy. A club cricketer for West Lothian Cricket Club, Ford made his debut for Scotland in first-class cricket against Ireland at Paisley in 1960. He played first-class cricket for Scotland until 1966, making ten appearances. In these matches, he scored a total of 235 runs at an average of 18.07; he made one half century, a score of 50 against Ireland in 1961. Besides playing, Ford scored in a match between Scotland and Warwickshire in 1965. Outside of cricket he was employed as a sales representative. Toward the end of his life, Ford struggled with alcoholism and succumbed to its effects in April 1987. His brother was the footballer Donald Ford.
