= John Pelosi =

Scottish footballer

Personal information
- Date of birth: 29 February 1956 (age 70)
- Place of birth: Glasgow, Scotland
- Position: Right winger

Senior career*
Years	Team	Apps	(Gls)
1976–1983	St Johnstone	156	(26)
1983–1987	Hamilton Academical	77	(8)
1984–1985	→ Kilmarnock (loan)	8	(1)
1987–1988	Queen of the South	31	(1)
1988–1989	Stenhousemuir	2	(0)
Total		274	(36)
- * Club domestic league appearances and goals

John Pelosi (born 29 February 1956) is a Scottish former footballer, who played for St Johnstone, Hamilton Academical, Kilmarnock, Queen of the South and Stenhousemuir. He is most famous for having been sued by a fellow footballer, Jim Brown, for a foul tackle which ended his opponent's career. Brown settled out of court a year later.
