= 1966–67 Heart of Midlothian F.C. season =

Heart of Midlothian
1966–67 season
- Manager: Tommy Walker (to 28 September); John Harvey (from 29 September)
- Stadium: Tynecastle Park
- Scottish First Division: 11th
- Scottish Cup: Round 1
- League Cup: Group Stage

During the 1966–67 season Hearts competed in the Scottish First Division, the Scottish Cup and the Scottish League Cup.

== Fixtures ==
=== Friendlies ===
1 August 1966 Friendly	Hearts	4–2	Maccabi Tel Aviv	Tynecastle Park
	Goal			Attendance: 5,000

26 September 1966 Friendly	Newcastle United	2–7	Hearts	St James' Park
	Goal			Attendance: 5,160

14 February 1967 Friendly	Hearts	3–1	SK Slovan Bratislava	Tynecastle Park
	Goal			Attendance: 8,000

17 February 1967 Friendly	Preston North End	0–3	Hearts	Deepdale
	Goal			Attendance: 7,737

20 February 1967 Friendly	Morton	3–2	Hearts	Cappielow Park
	Goal			Attendance: 0

10 March 1967 Friendly	Carlisle United	1–1	Hearts	Brunton Park
	Goal			Attendance: 7,489

3 April 1967 Friendly	Hartlepools United	1–1	Hearts	Victoria Park
	Goal			Attendance: 3,443

8 May 1967 Friendly	Derby County	1–1	Hearts	Baseball Ground
	Goal			Attendance: 5,000

9 May 1967 Friendly	Lincoln City	3–0	Hearts	Sincil Bank
	Goal			Attendance: 3,336

19 May 1967 Overseas Tour	KR Reykjavik	0–6	Hearts	KR-völlur
	Goal			Attendance: 2,000

22 May 1967 Overseas Tour	Valur	0–4	Hearts	Hlíðarendi
	Goal			Attendance: 2,500

25 May 1967 Overseas Tour	Reykjavik Select	3–3	Hearts	KR-völlur?
	Goal			Attendance: 3,000

=== League Cup ===
13 August 1966 League Cup Group	Hearts	0–2	Celtic	Tynecastle Park
				Attendance: 24,022

17 August 1966 League Cup Group	St Mirren	0–0	Hearts	St Mirren Park, Love Street
				Attendance: 4,213

20 August 1966 League Cup Group	Hearts	4–3	Clyde	Tynecastle Park
				Attendance: 4,765

27 August 1966 League Cup Group	Celtic	3–0	Hearts	Celtic Park
				Attendance: 42,524

31 August 1966 League Cup Group	Hearts	3–1	St Mirren	Tynecastle Park
				Attendance: 4,204

3 September 1966 League Cup Group	Clyde	1–3	Hearts	Shawfield Stadium
				Attendance: 2,119

=== Scottish Cup ===
28 January 1967 Scottish Cup R1	Hearts	0–3	Dundee United	Tynecastle Park
				Attendance: 17,139

=== Scottish First Division ===
10 September 1966 Scottish First Division	Hibernian	3–1	Hearts	Easter Road
				Attendance: 21,395

17 September 1966 Scottish First Division	Hearts	1–1	Airdrieonians	Tynecastle Park
				Attendance: 7,063

24 September 1966 Scottish First Division	Stirling Albion	0–3	Hearts	Annfield Stadium
				Attendance: 4,912

1 October 1966 Scottish First Division	Hearts	3–1	Dundee	Tynecastle Park
				Attendance: 7,182

8 October 1966 Scottish First Division	Ayr United	0–1	Hearts	Somerset Park
				Attendance: 6,193

15 October 1966 Scottish First Division	Hearts	1–1	Rangers	Tynecastle Park
				Attendance: 27,828

22 October 1966 Scottish First Division	St Johnstone	3–2	Hearts	Muirton Park
				Attendance: 4,732

29 October 1966 Scottish First Division	Hearts	0–1	Clyde	Tynecastle Park
				Attendance: 7,034

5 November 1966 Scottish First Division	Aberdeen	3–1	Hearts	Pittodrie Stadium
				Attendance: 9,408

12 November 1966 Scottish First Division	Hearts	1–1	Dunfermline Athletic	Tynecastle Park
				Attendance: 8,529

19 November 1966 Scottish First Division	Hearts	4–0	St Mirren	Tynecastle Park
				Attendance: 5,228

26 November 1966 Scottish First Division	Celtic	3–0	Hearts	Celtic Park
				Attendance: 36,238

3 December 1966 Scottish First Division	Partick Thistle	1–1	Hearts	Firhill Park
				Attendance: 5,700

10 December 1966 Scottish First Division	Hearts	2–1	Dundee United	Tynecastle Park
				Attendance: 8,857

17 December 1966 Scottish First Division	Hearts	1–1	Falkirk	Tynecastle Park
				Attendance: 5,144

24 December 1966 Scottish First Division	Kilmarnock	1–2	Hearts	Rugby Park
				Attendance: 5,039

31 December 1966 Scottish First Division	Hearts	1–2	Motherwell	Tynecastle Park
				Attendance: 8,177

2 January 1967 Scottish First Division	Hearts	0–0	Hibernian	Tynecastle Park
				Attendance: 30,086

14 January 1967 Scottish First Division	Dundee	1–1	Hearts	Dens Park
				Attendance: 10,168

21 January 1967 Scottish First Division	Hearts	1–0	Ayr United	Tynecastle Park
				Attendance: 4,351

4 February 1967 Scottish First Division	Rangers	5–1	Hearts	Ibrox Park
				Attendance: 33,087

11 February 1967 Scottish First Division	Hearts	1–0	Stirling Albion	Tynecastle Park
				Attendance: 5,987

25 February 1967 Scottish First Division	Clyde	2–1	Hearts	Shawfield Stadium
				Attendance: 3,963

4 March 1967 Scottish First Division	Hearts	0–3	Aberdeen	Tynecastle Park
				Attendance: 10,061

18 March 1967 Scottish First Division	St Mirren	3–0	Hearts	St Mirren Park, Love Street
				Attendance: 2,534

22 March 1967 Scottish First Division	Dunfermline Athletic	1–0	Hearts	Tynecastle Park
				Attendance: 5,088

25 March 1967 Scottish First Division	Hearts	0–3	Celtic	Tynecastle Park
				Attendance: 24,902

1 April 1967 Scottish First Division	Hearts	0–0	Partick Thistle	Tynecastle Park
				Attendance: 4,591

8 April 1967 Scottish First Division	Dundee United	2–0	Hearts	Tannadice Park
				Attendance: 3,865

12 April 1967 Scottish First Division	Falkirk	2–1	Hearts	Brockville Park
				Attendance: 3,479

19 April 1967 Scottish First Division	Hearts	5–1	Stirling Albion	Tynecastle Park
				Attendance: 1,846

22 April 1967 Scottish First Division	Hearts	1–0	Kilmarnock	Tynecastle Park
				Attendance: 5,809

26 April 1967 Scottish First Division	Airdrieonians	1–2	Hearts	Broomfield Park
				Attendance: 1,183

29 April 1967 Scottish First Division	Motherwell	1–0	Hearts	Fir Park
				Attendance: 3,146

== See also ==
- List of Heart of Midlothian F.C. seasons
