= Ian Lister =

Scottish footballer

Personal information
- Date of birth: 5 September 1946
- Place of birth: Kirkcaldy, Scotland
- Date of death: 8 February 2013 (aged 66)
- Height: 5 ft 7 in (1.70 m)
- Position: Winger

Youth career
- Smeaton Boys' Club

Senior career*
Years	Team	Apps	(Gls)
1963–1966	Aberdeen	22	(2)
1966–1968	Raith Rovers	30	(5)
1968–1969	Dunfermline Athletic	23	(4)
1969–1971	St Mirren	49	(12)
1971–1972	Raith Rovers	25	(1)
1972–1974	Berwick Rangers	50	(8)
- Caledonian
Total		199	(32)

International career
- Scotland youth
- * Club domestic league appearances and goals

Ian Lister (5 September 1946 – 8 February 2013) was a Scottish professional footballer who played as a winger.

== Early life ==
Lister was born on 5 September 1946 in Kirkcaldy.

== Career ==
Lister played for Smeaton Boys' Club, Aberdeen, Raith Rovers, Dunfermline Athletic, St Mirren, Berwick Rangers and Caledonian. While at Dunfermline Athletic, Lister scored in the 1968 Scottish Cup Final against Hearts, having previously also scored in one of the semi-final matches. He also played youth football for Scotland.

After retiring as a player, Lister became President of Inverness City.

== Later life and death ==
Lister died on 8 February 2013, at the age of 65.

== Lister Park ==
When Inverness City obtained a permanent ground for themselves in Inverness at the Bught Park, the new pitch was named Lister Park in his honour.
