= Alexander Ford =

Scottish cricketer (1900–1986)

Personal information
- Full name: Alexander Clark Ford
- Born: 8 November 1900; Uddingston, Lanarkshire, Scotland
- Died: 8 February 1986 (aged 85); Broxburn, West Lothian, Scotland
- Batting: Right-handed
- Bowling: Right-arm medium
- Relatives: Malcolm Ford (son)

Domestic team information
- Years: Team
- 1924–1925: Scotland

Career statistics
Competition	First-class
Matches	2
Runs scored	18
Batting average	6.00
100s/50s	–/–
Top score	17
Balls bowled	138
Wickets	1
Bowling average	78.00
5 wickets in innings	–
10 wickets in match	–
Best bowling	1/64
Catches/stumpings	–/–
- Source: Cricinfo

Alexander Clark Ford JP (8 November 1900 — 8 February 1986) was a Scottish first-class cricketer and veterinarian.

The second son of James Ford, he was born at Uddingston in November 1900. A club cricketer for Uddingston and later Grange, he made two appearances in first-class cricket for Scotland. The first came against Ireland at Dundee in 1924, with the second coming against Lancashire at Old Trafford on Scotland's 1925 tour of England. He scored 18 runs in his two matches and took a single wicket. Outside of cricket, Ford was a veterinarian by profession and was admitted to the Royal College of Veterinary Surgeons in 1925. In 1934, he was elected to Linlithgow Town Council. He was a magistrate in the town and later a police judge. Ford died at Broxburn in February 1986. His had two sons who were also sportsmen: Donald who played football for Hearts, and Malcolm who played first-class cricket for Scotland.
