= National Soccer League Coach of the Year =

- Awarded for: The outstanding manager in each given NSL season
- Country: Australia
- First award: 1977
- Final award: 2004

Highlights
- Most awards: Eddie Thomson (3)

The National Soccer League Coach of the Year was an annual soccer award presented to coaches in Australia. It recognised the most outstanding manager in the National Soccer League each season. The award was established in the first NSL season, 1977.

In 1977, it was given to Rale Rasic who came second in the NSL season that year with Marconi. The last winner of the award was Mich d'Avray, who won the 2003–04 season with Perth Glory. Eddie Thomson won the award three times, the most for an NSL manager.

== Winners ==
Season	Manager	Nationality	Club	Ref
1977	Rale Rasic	Australia, Yugoslavia	Marconi	
1978	Jerry Haldi	Israel	Sydney City	
1979	Les Scheinflug	Germany	Marconi	
1980	John Margeritis	—	South Melbourne	
1981	Eddie Thomson	Scotland	Sydney City	
1982	Frank Arok	Australia, Yugoslavia	St George	
1983	Frank Arok (2)	Australia, Yugoslavia	St George	
1984	Eddie Thomson (2)	Scotland	Sydney City	
1985	Eddie Thomson (3)	Scotland	Sydney City	
1986	Dragoslav Šekularac	Yugoslavia	Melbourne City	
1987	Rale Rasic (2)	Australia, Yugoslavia	APIA	
1988	Brian Garvey	England	South Melbourne	
1989	Berti Mariani	Australia	Marconi	
1989–90	Berti Mariani (2)	Australia	Marconi	
1990–91	Zoran Matić	Yugoslavia	Adelaide City	
1991–92	David Ratcliffe	Australia	Wollongong City	
1992–93	Jim Pyrgolios	—	South Melbourne	
1993–94	Mirko Bazic	—	Melbourne Knights	
1994–95	Zoran Matić (2)	Yugoslavia	Adelaide City	
1995–96	John Perin	Australia	Adelaide City	
1996–97	Branko Culina	Australia, Yugoslavia	Sydney United	
1997–98	Ange Postecoglou	Australia	South Melbourne	
1998–99	Dave Mitchell	Australia	Sydney United	
1999–2000	Bernd Stange	Germany	Perth Glory	
2000–01	Mike Petersen	Australia	South Melbourne	
2001–02	Ian Crook	England	Newcastle United	
2002–03	Lawrie McKinna	Scotland	Northern Spirit	
2003–04	Mich d'Avray	England, South Africa	Perth Glory	

== Multiple winners ==
Awards	Player	Team	Seasons
3	(Scotland) Eddie Thomson	Sydney City	1981, 1984, 1985
2	(Australia) (Socialist Federal Republic of Yugoslavia) Frank Arok	St George	1982, 1983
2	(Australia) Berti Mariani	Marconi	1989, 1989–90
2	(Socialist Federal Republic of Yugoslavia) Zoran Matić	Adelaide City	1990–91, 1994–95

== Awards won by nationality ==
Country	Wins^{a}
Australia	12^{b}
Yugoslavia	7^{b}
Scotland	4
England	3
Germany	2
Israel	1
South Africa	1

^{a}Only managers with a verifiable nationality are included

^{b}Frank Arok, Rale Rasic and Branko Culina are included in both totals

== Awards won by club ==
Club	Wins
South Melbourne	5
Sydney City	4
Marconi	4
Adelaide City	3
St George	2
Sydney United	2
Perth Glory	2
Melbourne City	1
APIA	1
Wollongong City	1
Melbourne Knights	1
Newcastle United	1
Northern Spirit	1
