= George Miller (footballer, born 1939) =

Scottish footballer and manager

Personal information
- Full name: George Miller
- Date of birth: 20 May 1939
- Place of birth: Larkhall, Scotland
- Date of death: 26 December 2008 (aged 69)
- Place of death: Larkhall, Scotland
- Positions: Half-back; central defender

Youth career
- 1956–1959: Royal Albert

Senior career*
| Years | Team | Apps | (Gls) |
| 1959–1964 | Dunfermline Athletic | 167 | (16) |
| 1964–1965 | Wolverhampton Wanderers | 37 | (3) |
| 1965–1968 | Hearts | 72 | (5) |
| 1968–1972 | Falkirk | 107 | (25) |

International career
| 1964 | Scottish Football League XI | 1 | (0) |

Managerial career
- 1972–1975: Dunfermline Athletic
- 1976–1978: Falkirk
- 1989: Hamilton Academical
- 1990: Hamilton Academical
- * Club domestic league appearances and goals

George Miller (20 May 1939 – 26 December 2008) was a Scottish football player and manager. He was a member of the first Dunfermline Athletic side to win a major honour, the 1961 Scottish Cup.

== Playing career ==
After leaving Larkhall Academy, Miller started playing for local side Royal Albert, where he would stay until 1959. He was signed by Dunfermline Athletic before the start of the 1959–60 season, instantly becoming a first-team regular as the Pars battled against relegation. The arrival of Jock Stein in 1960 transformed the side however, and against the odds they reached the 1961 Scottish Cup final against Celtic. Miller played as a wing-half in an initial 0–0 draw; however, an injury to Jackie Williamson required him to move to centre-half for the replay. The subsequent 2–0 victory enshrined that XI's place in Dunfermline folklore and served to galvanise the entire club.

Dunfermline developed into regular challengers at the top end of the league table and Miller notched seven goals as they finished an unprecedented 4th in 1961–62. The team also enjoyed several notable European campaigns, with Miller's individual highlight coming in the 1962–63 Fairs Cup, his 2nd-leg goal helping the Pars to a memorable 2–1 aggregate victory over English giants Everton.

Miller was the subject of a lucrative transfer bid from Wolves in October 1964 and the £28,500 on offer proved too much for Dunfermline to resist. However, he failed to settle in the West Midlands and returned to Scotland after just 13 months after 45 appearances, joining league runners-up Heart of Midlothian in November 1965. He spent three seasons at Tynecastle, with the highlight being a run to the final of the 1967–68 Scottish Cup final, where his former side Dunfermline defeated the Maroons 3–1.

In November 1968, Miller joined Falkirk, then struggling near the bottom of the First Division. Despite his best efforts they were relegated but bounced back to claim the 1969–70 Division Two title. By this stage Miller was approaching veteran status and, after two seasons of First Division consolidation with Falkirk, he left Brockville Park in 1972 to become manager of recently relegated Dunfermline Athletic in the summer of 1972.

== Managerial career ==
Miller was able to lead the side to promotion in his first season in charge, although Clyde took the 1972–73 Second Division title. Miller's first managerial season in the top flight witnessed Dunfermline avoid relegation on goal difference, however it was largely overshadowed by the death of left-back John Lunn, at only 31 years of age. League reorganisation the next season saw the Pars placed in the new (second tier) First Division but a disastrous 1975–76 campaign would end in relegation.

Miller resigned his position in late 1975 but was quickly back in the game when appointed Falkirk manager in December 1976. The Bairns were also struggling though, and ended the season bottom of the First Division and relegated. When Miller could not secure promotion the following year, finishing 9-point behind the second promotion place, his time at Brockville came to an end.

Hamilton Academical was Miller's next port of call, where he worked as commercial manager from 1984. On two occasions he fulfilled the role of caretaker manager, after the departure of Jim Dempsey in 1989 and John Lambie in 1990.

Miller died of cancer on 26 December 2008.
