= John Lunn (footballer) =

Scottish footballer (1942–1973)

Personal information
- Date of birth: 9 December 1942
- Place of birth: Fife, Scotland
- Date of death: 10 December 1973 (aged 31)
- Place of death: Edinburgh, Scotland
- Position: Left-back

Youth career
- Blairhall Colliery

Senior career*
Years	Team	Apps	(Gls)
1963–1972	Dunfermline Athletic	249	(5)
- * Club domestic league appearances and goals

John Lunn (1942–1973) was a Scottish professional footballer, who played as a left-back for Dunfermline Athletic. Lunn helped Dunfermline win the 1967–68 Scottish Cup. He later suffered from leukemia and died in 1973.
