= 1972–73 Scottish Division One =

67th season of top-tier football league in Scotland

Scottish Division One
- Season: 1972–73
- Champions: Celtic
- Relegated: Kilmarnock; Airdrieonians

The 1972–73 Scottish Division One was won by Celtic, one point ahead of their nearest rival Rangers. Kilmarnock and Airdrieonians finished 17th and 18th respectively and were relegated to the 1973–74 Second Division.

== League table ==
Pos	Team	Pld	W	D	L	GF	GA	GD	Pts	Qualification or relegation
1	Celtic	34	26	5	3	93	28	+65	57	Champion
2	Rangers	34	26	4	4	74	30	+44	56	
3	Hibernian	34	19	7	8	74	33	+41	45	
4	Aberdeen	34	16	11	7	61	34	+27	43	
5	Dundee	34	17	9	8	68	43	+25	43	
6	Ayr United	34	16	8	10	50	51	−1	40	
7	Dundee United	34	17	5	12	56	51	+5	39	
8	Motherwell	34	11	9	14	38	48	−10	31	
9	East Fife	34	11	8	15	46	54	−8	30	
10	Heart of Midlothian	34	12	6	16	39	50	−11	30	
11	St Johnstone	34	10	9	15	52	67	−15	29	
12	Morton	34	10	8	16	47	53	−6	28	
13	Partick Thistle	34	10	8	16	40	53	−13	28	
14	Falkirk	34	7	12	15	38	56	−18	26	
15	Arbroath	34	9	8	17	39	63	−24	26	
16	Dumbarton	34	6	11	17	43	72	−29	23	
17	Kilmarnock	34	7	8	19	40	71	−31	22	Relegated to 1973–74 Second Division
18	Airdrieonians	34	4	8	22	34	75	−41	16	Relegated to 1973–74 Second Division

Source: Soccerbase and League Tables

== Results ==
Home \ Away	ABE	AIR	ARB	AYR	CEL	DUM	DND	DNU	EFI	FAL	HOM	HIB	KIL	MOR	MOT	PAR	RAN	STJ
Aberdeen		5–1	0–0	1–0	2–3	6–0	3–1	0–0	4–3	2–2	3–1	1–0	3–0	3–0	7–2	0–0	2–2	0–0
Airdrieonians	1–1		3–1	0–1	2–1	2–3	0–1	2–2	1–1	0–0	0–2	0–4	0–1	0–3	1–2	1–3	2–6	1–3
Arbroath	1–1	2–1		1–1	1–2	2–1	2–1	2–4	1–0	5–1	3–0	2–3	3–3	0–1	0–1	2–1	1–2	3–0
Ayr United	2–3	3–2	2–0		1–3	2–0	2–1	2–1	3–2	1–1	2–0	1–1	1–1	1–1	3–2	2–1	2–1	3–1
Celtic	2–0	1–1	4–0	1–0		5–0	2–1	3–1	3–0	4–0	4–2	1–1	6–2	1–0	2–0	1–1	3–1	4–0
Dumbarton	1–2	3–5	0–0	1–1	1–6		2–2	4–1	0–0	0–0	0–2	2–2	4–2	2–2	0–0	4–2	1–2	1–1
Dundee	0–0	1–1	6–0	2–1	2–0	2–1		3–0	4–0	5–3	2–2	1–0	1–0	6–0	2–0	4–1	1–1	3–0
Dundee United	3–2	3–1	1–1	2–1	2–2	3–2	2–1		1–1	1–0	3–2	1–0	2–1	1–0	1–2	0–3	1–4	5–1
East Fife	0–1	3–0	2–0	2–2	2–2	2–1	0–1	1–0		1–2	1–0	0–1	3–0	4–3	3–1	0–1	0–4	2–2
Falkirk	0–0	1–1	3–1	1–2	2–3	2–0	2–2	1–0	3–4		1–3	1–0	3–2	2–0	0–1	0–3	2–4	0–0
Heart of Midlothian	2–1	0–1	3–0	3–0	0–2	1–0	1–2	0–2	1–1	1–0		0–7	0–0	0–0	0–0	2–0	0–1	1–0
Hibernian	3–2	5–2	0–0	8–1	0–3	5–0	1–1	3–1	1–0	3–0	2–0		4–1	2–1	0–1	2–0	1–2	3–2
Kilmarnock	0–2	3–1	2–0	0–1	0–4	2–2	1–2	0–1	1–3	2–2	2–1	2–2		2–1	1–0	2–3	2–1	1–4
Morton	1–2	4–0	1–1	1–1	0–2	1–1	5–2	2–0	3–1	1–1	2–4	0–3	2–1		1–0	5–0	1–2	3–0
Motherwell	2–0	2–0	2–0	1–2	0–5	0–2	2–2	1–4	0–1	1–1	2–2	1–1	2–0	3–0		0–0	0–2	1–1
Partick Thistle	0–2	2–0	1–2	1–2	0–4	4–1	1–1	0–3	1–1	0–0	3–0	1–3	1–1	1–0	0–3		0–1	1–1
Rangers	0–0	1–0	5–0	2–1	2–1	3–1	3–1	2–1	2–0	1–0	0–1	1–0	4–0	1–1	2–1	2–1		5–1
St Johnstone	1–0	1–1	5–2	3–0	1–3	0–2	4–1	1–3	4–2	2–1	3–2	1–3	2–2	3–1	2–2	1–3	1–2	

Legend: Blue = home team win; Yellow = draw; Red = away team win.

== Awards ==
Award	Winner	Club
SFWA Footballer of the Year	(Scotland) George Connelly	Celtic

== See also ==
- Nine in a row
