= 1969–70 Scottish Division One =

64th season of top-tier football league in Scotland

Scottish Division One
- Season: 1969–70
- Champions: Celtic
- Relegated: Raith Rovers; Partick Thistle

The 1969–70 Scottish Division One was won by Celtic by twelve points over nearest rival Rangers. Raith Rovers and Partick Thistle finished 17th and 18th respectively and were relegated to the 1970-71 Second Division.

== League table ==
Pos	Team	Pld	W	D	L	GF	GA	GD	Pts
1	Celtic	34	27	3	4	96	33	+63	57
2	Rangers	34	19	7	8	67	40	+27	45
3	Hibernian	34	19	6	9	65	40	+25	44
4	Heart of Midlothian	34	13	12	9	50	36	+14	38
5	Dundee United	34	16	6	12	62	64	−2	38
6	Dundee	34	15	6	13	49	44	+5	36
7	Kilmarnock	34	13	10	11	62	57	+5	36
8	Aberdeen	34	14	7	13	55	45	+10	35
9	Morton	34	13	9	12	52	52	0	35
10	Dunfermline Athletic	34	15	5	14	45	45	0	35
11	Motherwell	34	11	10	13	49	51	−2	32
12	Airdrieonians	34	12	8	14	59	64	−5	32
13	St Johnstone	34	11	9	14	50	62	−12	31
14	Ayr United	34	12	6	16	37	52	−15	30
15	St Mirren	34	8	9	17	39	54	−15	25
16	Clyde	34	9	7	18	34	56	−22	25
17	Raith Rovers	34	5	11	18	32	67	−35	21
18	Partick Thistle	34	5	7	22	41	82	−41	17

Source: "1969-1970 First Division - SPFL Archive". SPFL.

== Results ==
Home \ Away	ABE	AIR	AYR	CEL	CLY	DND	DNU	DNF	HOM	HIB	KIL	MOR	MOT	PAR	RAI	RAN	STJ	STM
Aberdeen		0–1	1–0	2–3	6–0	1–1	0–0	2–0	0–1	0–2	2–2	2–2	4–1	2–1	5–1	2–3	0–0	1–1
Airdrieonians	3–4		0–0	0–2	4–4	0–1	6–3	3–0	1–2	3–2	1–0	1–1	1–0	2–3	3–0	1–3	3–1	1–0
Ayr United	1–2	1–3		2–4	1–0	3–2	2–3	1–0	0–0	3–0	3–2	1–0	1–0	2–1	2–1	2–1	0–0	1–1
Celtic	1–2	4–2	3–0		2–1	1–0	7–2	3–1	0–2	1–2	3–1	4–0	6–1	8–1	7–1	0–0	2–2	2–0
Clyde	2–1	1–2	0–1	0–2		1–1	2–2	2–1	2–1	1–0	2–3	0–0	0–2	2–1	1–1	1–0	3–0	1–0
Dundee	2–0	4–2	1–0	1–2	3–0		1–2	1–1	2–0	1–0	3–0	2–1	1–3	4–1	0–0	2–1	0–2	1–0
Dundee United	2–0	5–2	3–1	0–2	3–1	4–1		1–3	2–3	0–1	2–2	5–4	0–0	1–0	4–2	0–0	1–0	3–1
Dunfermline Athletic	2–1	4–2	0–0	2–1	1–0	3–2	2–3		1–0	1–2	2–1	1–2	2–1	1–1	3–0	2–1	3–0	2–0
Heart of Midlothian	2–2	5–0	3–0	0–0	1–1	1–3	2–2	2–0		0–2	4–1	0–1	2–2	1–1	3–2	1–2	0–0	1–0
Hibernian	1–2	3–1	4–3	1–2	1–0	4–1	3–1	3–0	0–0		2–1	1–0	1–1	5–1	3–1	2–2	4–1	2–0
Kilmarnock	0–2	1–0	4–1	2–4	2–1	3–0	3–1	1–0	0–0	2–2		5–2	2–2	4–2	1–0	2–2	4–1	1–1
Morton	3–2	3–3	1–0	0–3	1–0	0–1	6–0	3–1	2–3	1–1	1–1		1–0	4–1	2–1	2–2	1–1	2–1
Motherwell	0–2	2–2	3–0	1–2	1–0	1–1	0–2	0–0	0–2	2–1	1–0	1–0		3–1	1–2	2–2	4–1	3–0
Partick Thistle	0–3	1–3	1–3	1–5	1–2	1–0	1–2	1–2	1–0	3–1	2–2	1–2	2–2		1–1	1–2	4–3	0–0
Raith Rovers	0–1	1–0	1–1	0–2	1–1	0–0	0–1	1–1	0–3	0–3	2–3	2–1	2–2	1–1		2–1	1–0	1–3
Rangers	2–0	1–1	3–0	0–1	3–0	3–1	2–1	2–0	3–2	1–3	5–3	0–2	2–1	3–1	3–0		3–1	2–0
St Johnstone	3–1	1–1	2–0	1–4	3–2	1–4	1–0	1–0	3–3	1–0	1–1	4–0	4–3	5–2	1–1	1–3		2–3
St Mirren	2–0	1–1	2–1	2–3	4–0	2–1	3–1	1–3	0–0	3–3	0–2	1–1	2–3	1–0	3–3	0–4	1–2	

Legend: Blue = home team win; Yellow = draw; Red = away team win.

== Awards ==
Award	Winner	Club
SFWA Footballer of the Year	(Scotland) Pat Stanton	Hibernian

== See also ==
- Nine in a row
