= 1972–73 Scottish League Cup =

Tournament details
- Country: Scotland

Final positions
- Champions: Hibernian
- Runners-up: Celtic

The 1972–73 Scottish League Cup was the twenty-seventh season of Scotland's second football knockout competition. The competition was won by Hibernian, who defeated Celtic in the Final.

== First round ==
=== Group 1 ===
Team	Pld	W	D	L	GF	GA	GD	Pts
Partick Thistle	6	3	3	0	11	3	+8	9
Stranraer	6	3	0	3	11	8	+3	6
Morton	6	2	2	2	11	9	+2	6
Cowdenbeath	6	1	1	4	6	19	−13	3

Home team	Score	Away team	Date
Cowdenbeath	1–5	Partick Thistle	12 August 1972
Morton	1–5	Stranraer	12 August 1972
Partick Thistle	0–0	Morton	16 August 1972
Stranraer	3–0	Cowdenbeath	16 August 1972
Cowdenbeath	1–0	Morton	19 August 1972
Stranraer	0–2	Partick Thistle	19 August 1972
Cowdenbeath	0–2	Stranraer	23 August 1972
Morton	0–0	Partick Thistle	23 August 1972
Partick Thistle	2–2	Cowdenbeath	26 August 1972
Stranraer	1–3	Morton	26 August 1972
Morton	7–2	Cowdenbeath	30 August 1972
Partick Thistle	2–0	Stranraer	30 August 1972

=== Group 2 ===
Team	Pld	W	D	L	GF	GA	GD	Pts
Aberdeen	6	5	0	1	19	5	+14	10
Hibernian	6	5	0	1	14	8	+6	10
Queen of the South	6	2	0	4	5	13	−8	4
Queen's Park	6	0	0	6	4	16	−12	0

Home team	Score	Away team	Date
Hibernian	4–2	Queen's Park	12 August 1972
Queen of the South	0–4	Aberdeen	12 August 1972
Aberdeen	4–1	Hibernian	16 August 1972
Queen's Park	1–2	Queen of the South	16 August 1972
Aberdeen	5–1	Queen's Park	19 August 1972
Hibernian	3–0	Queen of the South	19 August 1972
Hibernian	2–1	Aberdeen	23 August 1972
Queen of the South	1–0	Queen's Park	23 August 1972
Aberdeen	2–1	Queen of the South	26 August 1972
Queen's Park	0–1	Hibernian	26 August 1972
Queen of the South	1–3	Hibernian	30 August 1972
Queen's Park	0–3	Aberdeen	30 August 1972

=== Group 3 ===
Team	Pld	W	D	L	GF	GA	GD	Pts
Rangers	6	5	0	1	16	6	+10	10
Ayr United	6	3	0	3	12	6	+6	6
St Mirren	6	2	1	3	12	15	−3	5
Clydebank	6	1	1	4	6	19	−13	3

Home team	Score	Away team	Date
Ayr United	2–1	St Mirren	12 August 1972
Rangers	2–0	Clydebank	12 August 1972
Clydebank	1–0	Ayr United	16 August 1972
St Mirren	0–4	Rangers	16 August 1972
Rangers	2–1	Ayr United	19 August 1972
St Mirren	4–2	Clydebank	19 August 1972
Ayr United	5–0	Clydebank	23 August 1972
Rangers	1–4	St Mirren	23 August 1972
Clydebank	0–5	Rangers	26 August 1972
St Mirren	0–3	Ayr United	26 August 1972
Ayr United	1–2	Rangers	30 August 1972
Clydebank	3–3	St Mirren	30 August 1972

=== Group 4 ===
Team	Pld	W	D	L	GF	GA	GD	Pts
Dundee United	6	5	0	1	13	5	+8	10
Stenhousemuir	6	2	2	2	11	13	−2	6
Kilmarnock	6	2	1	3	9	9	0	5
Dunfermline Athletic	6	1	1	4	6	12	−6	3

Home team	Score	Away team	Date
Dundee United	2–0	Dunfermline Athletic	12 August 1972
Stenhousemuir	1–1	Kilmarnock	12 August 1972
Dunfermline Athletic	2–2	Stenhousemuir	16 August 1972
Kilmarnock	2–3	Dundee United	16 August 1972
Dundee United	5–0	Stenhousemuir	19 August 1972
Kilmarnock	2–1	Dunfermline Athletic	19 August 1972
Dundee United	2–1	Kilmarnock	23 August 1972
Stenhousemuir	5–2	Dunfermline Athletic	23 August 1972
Dunfermline Athletic	0–1	Dundee United	26 August 1972
Kilmarnock	3–1	Stenhousemuir	26 August 1972
Dunfermline Athletic	1–0	Kilmarnock	30 August 1972
Stenhousemuir	2–0	Dundee United	30 August 1972

=== Group 5 ===
Team	Pld	W	D	L	GF	GA	GD	Pts
St Johnstone	6	5	0	1	17	6	+11	10
Falkirk	6	3	0	3	10	12	−2	6
Raith Rovers	6	2	0	4	6	7	−1	4
Montrose	6	2	0	4	8	16	−8	4

Home team	Score	Away team	Date
Montrose	3–4	Falkirk	12 August 1972
St Johnstone	2–0	Raith Rovers	12 August 1972
Falkirk	1–2	St Johnstone	16 August 1972
Raith Rovers	1–2	Montrose	16 August 1972
Falkirk	1–0	Raith Rovers	19 August 1972
St Johnstone	4–1	Montrose	19 August 1972
Montrose	2–1	Raith Rovers	23 August 1972
St Johnstone	6–1	Falkirk	23 August 1972
Falkirk	3–0	Montrose	26 August 1972
Raith Rovers	3–0	St Johnstone	26 August 1972
Montrose	0–3	St Johnstone	30 August 1972
Raith Rovers	1–0	Falkirk	30 August 1972

=== Group 6 ===
Team	Pld	W	D	L	GF	GA	GD	Pts
Airdrieonians	6	3	2	1	9	7	+2	8
Dumbarton	6	2	2	2	9	7	+2	6
Heart of Midlothian	6	1	3	2	6	5	+1	5
Berwick Rangers	6	1	3	2	5	10	−5	5

Home team	Score	Away team	Date
Airdrieonians	0–0	Berwick Rangers	12 August 1972
Dumbarton	1–0	Heart of Midlothian	12 August 1972
Berwick Rangers	1–0	Dumbarton	16 August 1972
Heart of Midlothian	0–0	Airdrieonians	16 August 1972
Berwick Rangers	1–1	Heart of Midlothian	19 August 1972
Dumbarton	4–1	Airdrieonians	19 August 1972
Airdrieonians	2–1	Heart of Midlothian	23 August 1972
Dumbarton	2–2	Berwick Rangers	23 August 1972
Berwick Rangers	1–4	Airdrieonians	26 August 1972
Heart of Midlothian	1–1	Dumbarton	26 August 1972
Airdrieonians	2–1	Dumbarton	30 August 1972
Heart of Midlothian	3–0	Berwick Rangers	30 August 1972

=== Group 7 ===
Team	Pld	W	D	L	GF	GA	GD	Pts
Dundee	6	6	0	0	19	5	+14	12
Motherwell	6	2	2	2	11	9	+2	6
Clyde	6	2	2	2	9	7	+2	6
East Stirlingshire	6	0	0	6	4	22	−18	0

Home team	Score	Away team	Date
Clyde	2–2	Motherwell	12 August 1972
East Stirlingshire	2–8	Dundee	12 August 1972
Dundee	2–1	Clyde	16 August 1972
Motherwell	1–0	East Stirlingshire	16 August 1972
Clyde	3–1	East Stirlingshire	19 August 1972
Motherwell	1–3	Dundee	19 August 1972
Clyde	0–1	Dundee	23 August 1972
East Stirlingshire	1–5	Motherwell	23 August 1972
Dundee	3–0	East Stirlingshire	26 August 1972
Motherwell	1–1	Clyde	26 August 1972
Dundee	2–1	Motherwell	30 August 1972
East Stirlingshire	0–2	Clyde	30 August 1972

=== Group 8 ===
Team	Pld	W	D	L	GF	GA	GD	Pts
Celtic	6	4	2	0	18	6	+12	10
East Fife	6	2	2	2	7	8	−1	6
Stirling Albion	6	2	1	3	4	10	−6	5
Arbroath	6	1	1	4	9	14	−5	3

Home team	Score	Away team	Date
East Fife	2–1	Arbroath	12 August 1972
Stirling Albion	0–3	Celtic	12 August 1972
Arbroath	1–2	Stirling Albion	16 August 1972
Celtic	1–1	East Fife	16 August 1972
Arbroath	0–5	Celtic	19 August 1972
East Fife	0–0	Stirling Albion	19 August 1972
East Fife	2–3	Celtic	23 August 1972
Stirling Albion	2–1	Arbroath	23 August 1972
Arbroath	3–0	East Fife	26 August 1972
Celtic	3–0	Stirling Albion	26 August 1972
Celtic	3–3	Arbroath	28 August 1972
Stirling Albion	0–2	East Fife	30 August 1972

=== Group 9 ===
Team	Pld	W	D	L	GF	GA	GD	Pts
Alloa Athletic	4	3	0	1	9	6	+3	6
Albion Rovers	4	2	0	2	11	9	+2	4
Forfar Athletic	4	2	0	2	5	5	0	4
Hamilton Academical	4	2	0	2	5	6	−1	4
Brechin City	4	1	0	3	3	7	−4	2

Home team	Score	Away team	Date
Forfar Athletic	2–1	Alloa Athletic	12 August 1972
Hamilton Academical	1–0	Brechin City	12 August 1972
Alloa Athletic	4–3	Albion Rovers	16 August 1972
Brechin City	2–1	Forfar Athletic	16 August 1972
Albion Rovers	3–0	Brechin City	19 August 1972
Forfar Athletic	1–0	Hamilton Academical	19 August 1972
Hamilton Academical	4–3	Albion Rovers	22 August 1972
Brechin City	1–2	Alloa Athletic	23 August 1972
Albion Rovers	2–1	Forfar Athletic	26 August 1972
Alloa Athletic	2–0	Hamilton Academical	26 August 1972

== Supplementary round ==
=== First leg ===
Home team	Score	Away team	Date
Alloa Athletic	0–0	Ayr United	4 September 1972
Motherwell	4–1	Albion Rovers	4 September 1972

=== Second leg ===
Home team	Score	Away team	Date	Agg
Albion Rovers	0–4	Motherwell	6 September 1972	1–8
Ayr United	0–1	Alloa Athletic	6 September 1972	0–1

== 2nd round ==
=== First leg ===
Home team	Score	Away team	Date
Aberdeen	8–0	Falkirk	20 September 1972
Dumbarton	3–0	Dundee	20 September 1972
Dundee United	2–5	Hibernian	20 September 1972
East Fife	1–0	Partick Thistle	20 September 1972
Motherwell	0–1	Airdrieonians	20 September 1972
St Johnstone	2–0	Alloa Athletic	20 September 1972
Stenhousemuir	0–5	Rangers	20 September 1972
Stranraer	1–2	Celtic	20 September 1972

=== Second leg ===
Home team	Score	Away team	Date	Agg
Airdrieonians	1–1	Motherwell	4 October 1972	2–1
Alloa Athletic	0–1	St Johnstone	3 October 1972	0–3
Celtic	5–2	Stranraer	4 October 1972	7–3
Dundee	4–0	Dumbarton	4 October 1972	4–3
Falkirk	3–2	Aberdeen	4 October 1972	3–10
Hibernian	0–0	Dundee United	4 October 1972	5–2
Partick Thistle	0–0	East Fife	4 October 1972	0–1
Rangers	1–2	Stenhousemuir	4 October 1972	6–2

== Quarter-finals ==
=== First leg ===
Home team	Score	Away team	Date
Aberdeen	3–0	East Fife	11 October 1972
Airdrieonians	2–6	Hibernian	11 October 1972
Dundee	1–0	Celtic	11 October 1972
Rangers	1–1	St Johnstone	11 October 1972

=== Second leg ===
Home team	Score	Away team	Date	Agg
Celtic	3–2	Dundee	1 November 1972	3–3
East Fife	1–4	Aberdeen	1 November 1972	1–7
Hibernian	4–1	Airdrieonians	1 November 1972	10–3
St Johnstone	0–2	Rangers	1 November 1972	1–3

=== Replay ===
Home team	Score	Away team	Date
Celtic	4–1	Dundee	20 November 1972

== Semi-finals ==
=== Ties ===
Home team	Score	Away team	Date
Hibernian	1–0	Rangers	22 November 1972
Celtic	3–2	Aberdeen	27 November 1972

== Final ==
9 December 1972

Hibernian	2–1	Celtic
Stanton 60'; O'Rourke 66'		Dalglish 77'

Hampden Park, Glasgow
Attendance: 71,696
