= 1970–71 Scottish Division One =

65th season of top-tier football league in Scotland

Scottish Division One
- Season: 1970–71
- Champions: Celtic
- Relegated: St Mirren; Cowdenbeath

The 1970–71 Scottish Division One was won by Celtic by two points over nearest rival Aberdeen. St Mirren and Cowdenbeath finished 17th and 18th respectively and were relegated to the 1971–72 Second Division.

== League table ==
Pos	Team	Pld	W	D	L	GF	GA	GD	Pts	Qualification or relegation
1	Celtic	34	25	6	3	89	23	+66	56	Champion
2	Aberdeen	34	24	6	4	68	18	+50	54	
3	St Johnstone	34	19	6	9	59	44	+15	44	
4	Rangers	34	16	9	9	58	34	+24	41	
5	Dundee	34	14	10	10	53	45	+8	38	
6	Dundee United	34	14	8	12	53	54	−1	36	
7	Falkirk	34	13	9	12	46	53	−7	35	
8	Morton	34	13	8	13	44	44	0	34	
9	Airdrieonians	34	13	8	13	60	65	−5	34	
10	Motherwell	34	13	8	13	43	47	−4	34	
11	Heart of Midlothian	34	13	7	14	41	40	+1	33	
12	Hibernian	34	10	10	14	47	53	−6	30	
13	Kilmarnock	34	10	8	16	43	67	−24	28	
14	Ayr United	34	9	8	17	37	54	−17	26	
15	Clyde	34	8	10	16	33	59	−26	26	
16	Dunfermline Athletic	34	6	11	17	44	56	−12	23	
17	St Mirren	34	7	9	18	38	56	−18	23	Relegated to 1971–72 Second Division
18	Cowdenbeath	34	7	3	24	33	69	−36	17	Relegated to 1971–72 Second Division

Source: Soccerbase and League Tables

== Results ==
Home \ Away	ABE	AIR	AYR	CEL	CLY	COW	DND	DNU	DNF	FAL	HOM	HIB	KIL	MOR	MOT	RAN	STJ	STM
Aberdeen		1–1	4–1	1–1	3–0	7–0	3–0	4–0	3–2	1–0	1–0	3–0	3–0	3–1	0–0	0–0	0–0	1–1
Airdrieonians	0–4		2–0	1–3	1–2	2–1	2–6	1–2	1–0	7–1	0–0	2–0	1–1	0–2	3–0	4–3	5–0	1–1
Ayr United	0–1	0–0		1–2	4–0	1–2	0–1	1–0	4–1	1–1	1–0	2–0	1–1	2–1	0–0	2–1	1–3	1–1
Celtic	0–1	4–1	2–0		6–1	3–0	3–0	1–1	1–0	4–0	3–2	2–1	3–0	2–0	3–0	2–0	1–0	3–0
Clyde	1–2	1–1	0–0	0–5		1–3	0–0	1–2	3–1	3–2	1–0	0–0	0–1	1–0	1–2	2–2	3–0	1–2
Cowdenbeath	1–2	1–3	1–3	1–5	1–1		0–1	0–2	2–1	0–1	0–4	1–4	1–2	0–2	0–1	1–3	2–2	1–2
Dundee	1–2	3–0	2–1	1–8	1–3	5–1		2–3	0–0	1–2	1–0	1–0	3–0	2–0	4–0	1–0	0–1	2–2
Dundee United	0–2	2–2	4–2	1–2	1–0	4–2	3–2		2–2	3–1	4–1	1–1	3–2	2–3	2–2	0–2	0–2	2–1
Dunfermline Athletic	1–0	4–1	5–0	0–2	0–0	1–2	0–0	3–1		2–4	1–2	3–3	0–1	3–0	0–1	1–1	1–1	1–0
Falkirk	1–0	0–2	2–0	0–0	1–1	1–2	2–2	1–1	3–2		2–4	0–0	3–0	2–1	1–0	3–1	0–3	2–1
Heart of Midlothian	1–3	5–2	2–1	1–1	3–1	1–0	0–0	1–0	3–0	1–1		0–0	2–0	2–2	0–1	0–1	1–3	1–0
Hibernian	2–1	3–1	4–0	2–0	5–1	2–2	1–2	0–1	2–2	1–3	0–0		1–0	2–4	1–0	3–2	1–2	3–3
Kilmarnock	0–4	2–3	1–1	1–4	1–1	2–1	1–1	2–1	0–0	3–2	3–0	4–1		2–2	0–0	1–4	2–4	1–2
Morton	2–0	1–4	3–2	0–3	0–0	1–0	1–0	3–0	1–1	0–0	3–0	2–1	3–0		0–2	1–2	3–1	1–1
Motherwell	0–2	1–1	1–1	0–5	2–1	1–3	1–1	1–2	4–3	1–1	1–2	4–0	4–1	2–0		1–2	4–1	2–1
Rangers	0–2	5–0	2–0	1–1	5–0	5–0	0–0	1–1	2–0	2–0	1–0	1–1	4–2	0–0	3–1		0–2	1–0
St Johnstone	0–1	4–1	4–1	3–2	2–1	0–1	3–3	1–1	5–2	1–0	2–1	0–1	2–3	0–0	2–1	2–1		2–0
St Mirren	1–3	2–4	0–2	2–2	0–1	1–0	2–4	2–1	1–1	2–3	0–1	3–1	2–3	2–1	0–2	0–0	0–1	

Legend: Blue = home team win; Yellow = draw; Red = away team win.

== Awards ==
Award	Winner	Club
SFWA Footballer of the Year	(Scotland) Martin Buchan	Aberdeen

== See also ==
- Nine in a row
