= René Møller =

Danish footballer

Personal information
- Date of birth: 15 February 1946
- Place of birth: Randers, Denmark
- Date of death: 23 August 1994 (aged 48)
- Position: Forward

Senior career*
Years	Team	Apps	(Gls)
- Randers Freja
1967–1970	Heart of Midlothian	53	(12)
- Randers Freja
- * Club domestic league appearances and goals

René Møller (15 February 1946 – 23 August 1994) was a Danish former footballer, who played as a forward for Randers Freja and Heart of Midlothian.
