= John Harvey (football manager) =

Scottish footballer and manager

John Harvey was a Scottish football player and manager.
