= David Clunie =

Scottish footballer (1948–2025)

Personal information
- Date of birth: 16 March 1948
- Place of birth: Edinburgh, Scotland
- Date of death: 22 April 2025 (aged 77)
- Place of death: Edinburgh, Scotland
- Position: Full-back

Youth career
- Salvesen's Boys Club

Senior career*
Years	Team	Apps	(Gls)
1966–1977	Heart of Midlothian	224	(5)
1977	Berwick Rangers	1	(0)
1977–1978	St Johnstone	34	(0)
Total		259	(5)

International career
1969	Scottish Football League XI	1	(0)
1970	Scotland U23	2	(0)
- * Club domestic league appearances and goals

David Clunie (16 March 1948 – 22 April 2025) was a Scottish professional footballer who played as a full-back for Hearts, Berwick Rangers and St Johnstone.

Clunie scored eight goals for Hearts, mainly from penalty kicks. He was bought from Salveson Boys Club on 1 December 1964 and ended his stint with Hearts on 1 May 1977. After a year with St Johnstone, he retired.

Clunie represented the Scottish League once, in 1969. He also played twice for the Scotland under-23 team.

Clunie died in Edinburgh on 22 April 2025, at the age of 77.
