= Arthur Thomson (footballer, born 1948) =

Scottish footballer

Personal information
- Full name: Arthur Campbell Thomson
- Date of birth: 2 December 1948
- Place of birth: Edinburgh, Scotland
- Date of death: 7 March 2002 (aged 53)
- Place of death: Edinburgh, Scotland
- Position: Central defender

Youth career
- Chelsea

Senior career*
Years	Team	Apps	(Gls)
1966–1969	Heart of Midlothian	58	(0)
1969–1971	Oldham Athletic	28	(0)
1971–1972	Raith Rovers	33	(1)
	Dalkeith Thistle	?	(?)
Total		119	(1)

International career
	Scotland under-23	3	(0)
- * Club domestic league appearances and goals

Arthur Campbell Thomson (2 September 1948 – 7 March 2002) was a Scottish footballer, who played as a central defender in the Football League. He was born in Edinburgh.
