= Jim Brown (footballer, born 1950) =

Scottish footballer

Personal information
- Full name: James Brown
- Date of birth: 11 August 1950 (age 76)
- Place of birth: Edinburgh, Scotland
- Position: Defender

Senior career*
Years	Team	Apps	(Gls)
1967–1979	Heart of Midlothian	278	(21)
1979–1981	Hibernian	44	(0)
1981–1982	Dunfermline Athletic	13	(0)
Total		335	(21)

International career
1974	Scottish League XI	1	(0)
- * Club domestic league appearances and goals

James Brown (born 11 August 1950) is a Scottish former footballer, who played for Heart of Midlothian, Hibernian and Dunfermline Athletic. He is most famous for suing a fellow footballer, John Pelosi, for the foul tackle which ended his career. Brown settled out of court a year later.
