= Wilson Wood (footballer) =

Scottish footballer

Personal information
- Date of birth: 25 January 1943
- Place of birth: Whitburn, Scotland
- Date of death: 13 June 2017 (aged 74)
- Positions: Midfielder; defender

Youth career
- Lothian United
- Shotts Bon Accord

Senior career*
Years	Team	Apps	(Gls)
1960–1961	Newcastle United	0	(0)
1963–1966	Rangers	35	(4)
1967–1970	Dundee United	67	(5)
1970–1973	Hearts	42	(1)
1973–1975	Raith Rovers	44	(1)
Total		188	(11)
- * Club domestic league appearances and goals

Wilson Wood (25 January 1943 – 13 June 2017), born in Whitburn, was a Scottish footballer who played primarily as a midfielder.

== Career ==
A former lab assistant with the National Coal Board, Wood started his professional career with Newcastle United whom he joined from Shotts Bon Accord aged 17. He spent only one year on Tyneside and left the club without making an appearance, returning to Scotland to join Rangers. He spent seven seasons at Ibrox, where he won his only senior medal as a member of Rangers victorious 1964–65 League Cup side. Wood moved to Dundee United in 1967 and he featured regularly during his three years at Tannadice. However, in 1970 a contract dispute with United manager Jerry Kerr led to his departure to boyhood favourites Hearts, in exchange for Tommy Traynor. He spent three injury-plagued years with the Jambos before a final two years with Raith Rovers. His transfer to the Kirkcaldy side was the subject of controversy, with Hamilton Accies also claiming to have signed him.

After his retirement Wood worked as a physiotherapist.

== Honours ==
- Scottish League Cup: 1

1964-65
