= Tommy Veitch =

Scottish footballer

Personal information
- Full name: Thomas Veitch
- Date of birth: 16 October 1949
- Place of birth: Edinburgh, Scotland
- Date of death: 16 October 1987 (aged 38)
- Place of death: Clydebank, Scotland
- Height: 5 ft 10 in (1.78 m)
- Position: Midfielder

Youth career
- 19xx–1966: Bonnyrigg Rose Athletic
- 1966–1968: Heart of Midlothian

Senior career*
Years	Team	Apps	(Gls)
1968–1972	Heart of Midlothian	46	(2)
1972–1975	Tranmere Rovers	79	(5)
1975	Denver Dynamos	21	(1)
1975–1976	Halifax Town	22	(0)
1976	Hartlepool United	10	(0)
1976–1978	Greenock Morton	51	(0)
1978–1980	Airdrieonians	37	(0)
1980–1981	Queen of the South	3	(0)
Total		269	(8)
- * Club domestic league appearances and goals

Thomas Veitch (16 October 1949 – 16 October 1987) was a Scottish professional footballer who played as a midfielder. Active in Scotland, England and the United States, Veitch made over 250 career league appearances.

== Career ==
Born in Edinburgh, Veitch began his career with Bonnyrigg Rose Athletic, turning professional with Heart of Midlothian in 1968. Veitch also played in Scotland for Greenock Morton, Airdrieonians and Queen of the South, in England for Tranmere Rovers, Halifax Town and Hartlepool United, and in the United States for the Denver Dynamos, before retiring from professional football in 1981.

== Later life and death ==
Veitch died on 16 October 1987, his 38th birthday.
