= Donald Ford =

Scottish footballer (born 1944)

Personal information
- Full name: Donald Campbell Clark Ford
- Date of birth: 25 October 1944 (age 82)
- Place of birth: Linlithgow, Scotland
- Height: 5 ft 7 in (1.70 m)
- Position: Striker

Youth career
- 1962–1964: Vale of Avon

Senior career*
Years	Team	Apps	(Gls)
1964	Bo'ness United		
1964–1976	Heart of Midlothian	254	(93)
1976–1977	Falkirk	21	(5)

International career
1965–1966	Scotland Amateur	9	(11)
1971–1974	Scottish Football League XI	3	(0)
1973–1974	Scotland	3	(0)
- * Club domestic league appearances and goals

Donald Campbell Clark Ford (born 25 October 1944) is a Scottish former footballer who played as a striker, spending 11 years with Heart of Midlothian. He made three appearances for the Scotland national team.

== Football career ==
Having previously played with Vale of Avon, Ford was signed for Heart of Midlothian from junior side Bo'ness United in 1964 by Tommy Walker. Ford quickly made the adjustment to top flight football, playing seven times in his first full season in Gorgie, as Hearts lost the 1964–65 League title to Kilmarnock on goal average.

At this stage, Ford was still playing as an amateur, combining football with studies in chartered accountancy. This affected his footballing development and Ford's appearances over the following seasons were sporadic. Upon completion of his final accountancy exams in 1967, Ford signed professional terms and became an integral part of the Hearts first team. He played over 30 times in each of the following eight seasons before eventually transferring to Falkirk in 1976 at the age of 32. A serious knee injury forced him into retirement the following year.

Ford was capped three times for the Scotland national team, making his debut against Czechoslovakia in 1973. He had previously played 9 times for the Scotland national amateur team. He was selected in the squad for the 1974 FIFA World Cup in West Germany but did not make an appearance.

Ford's international recognition was especially notable as his career coincided with a gradual decline in Hearts' playing fortunes. Despite Ford striking up a successful front pairing with Drew Busby, the side struggled to match the standards set in the 1950s and early 60s. His only honours were runners-up medals: for the League in 1964–65, for the 1967–68 Scottish Cup and the 1970–71 Texaco Cup. Indeed, Ford was one of only two Hearts players capped in the 1970s, the other being goalkeeper Jim Cruickshank.

== Cricket career ==
Ford was an all-round sportsman and, as well as playing professional football, he was also a competent cricketer. During his footballing years, he regularly played for the West Lothian County side during the summer off-season. Ford's cricket career outlasted his footballing one, and so he was able to devote more time to it in his veteran years, captaining West Lothian for three seasons in his mid-thirties. His undoubted cricketing highlight was selection in the first Scotland squad for the Benson & Hedges Cup, in 1980.

== After retirement ==
Ford has remained active in the public sphere since his retirement from the sporting fields, serving on the Scottish Sports Council for a spell in the 1990s and as a local councillor in Linlithgow. He was also involved with Radio Forth's local football coverage in the 1980s.

In 1991, Ford left the accountancy profession and became a professional landscape photographer, a field he continues to work in to this day.

As a proud Hearts supporter, Ford has maintained an active interest in the club since his playing retirement. He played a significant role in persuading Wallace Mercer to invest in the club in the early 1980s, at a time when it teetered on the financial precipice. Within 5 years of Mercer's involvement the club had returned to the top flight and European football. Similarly, he was a vocal advocate of the fans campaign to prevent the sale of Tynecastle Stadium to clear debts by then Hearts chairman Chris Robinson during the 2004–05 season.

== Personal life ==
His father, Alexander, and brother, Malcolm, both played first-class cricket for Scotland.

== See also ==
- List of Scottish cricket and football players
