= Ian Sneddon (footballer) =

Scottish footballer

Personal information
- Full name: Ian Sneddon
- Date of birth: 30 November 1946 (age 79)
- Place of birth: Duntocher, Scotland
- Height: 5 ft 10 in (1.78 m)
- Position: Full back

Youth career
- Drumchapel Amateurs

Senior career*
Years	Team	Apps	(Gls)
1967–1975	Heart of Midlothian	129	(1)
1975	Denver Dynamos	21	(0)
1975–1977	Morton	23	(0)
1977	Windsor Stars		
- London City - Ontario
Total		173	(1)
- * Club domestic league appearances and goals

Ian Sneddon (born 30 November 1946) is a Scottish former professional footballer, who played for Heart of Midlothian, Denver Dynamos and Morton.

In 1977, he played in Canada in the National Soccer League with Windsor Stars.
