= Alan Anderson (footballer) =

Scottish footballer (1939–2022)

Personal information
- Full name: Arthur Alan Duncan Anderson
- Date of birth: 21 December 1939
- Place of birth: Edinburgh, Midlothian, Scotland
- Date of death: 27 February 2022 (aged 82)
- Position: Centre half

Youth career
- United Crossroads

Senior career*
Years	Team	Apps	(Gls)
- Dalkeith Thistle
1958–1959	Falkirk	0	(0)
1959	→ Alloa Athletic (loan)	3	(1)
1959–1962	Millwall	74	(0)
1962–1963	Scunthorpe United	6	(0)
1963–1976	Heart of Midlothian	352	(21)
Total		435	(22)

International career
1967	Scotland	5	(0)
- * Club domestic league appearances and goals

Arthur Alan Duncan Anderson (21 December 1939 – 27 February 2022) was a Scottish professional footballer who played as a centre half for Alloa Athletic, Falkirk, Millwall, Scunthorpe United and Hearts.

== Career ==
Anderson joined Millwall from Falkirk in October 1959 and helped the London club to win the championship of Division Four before being transferred to Scunthorpe United in 1962. However, Anderson could not settle in England. In November 1963 he was transferred to Heart of Midlothian. Anderson was the Hearts team captain for over 200 games. After long service and 38 goals for the club, he ended his career in May 1976.

He played seven times for a Scotland XI during their 1967 tour of Asia and Oceania, playing alongside Alex Ferguson. The Scotland XI won every game with Anderson at centre-half. He was awarded a cap for the tour by the Scottish Football Association in 2020, and the SFA announced in October 2021 that five of the tour matches (all of which Anderson played in) had been reclassified as full internationals.

== Personal life ==
Anderson died in February 2022, at the age of 82.
