= NASL Final 1972 =

Soccer match

- Event: NASL Final
New York Cosmos	St. Louis Stars
2	1
- Date: August 26, 1972
- Venue: Hofstra Stadium, Hempstead, New York
- Referee: Roger Schott (United States)
- Attendance: 6,102

The 1972 NASL Final was the championship match of the 1972 season, between the New York Cosmos and the St. Louis Stars. The match was played on August 26, 1972 at Hofstra Stadium, in Hempstead, New York. The New York Cosmos won the match, 2–1, and were crowned the 1972 NASL champions.

== Background ==
=== St. Louis Stars ===
The St. Louis Stars qualified for the playoffs by winning the Southern Division with 69 points. This guaranteed them at least one home playoff game. They defeated the 1970 champions, the Rochester Lancers, 2–0, in a semifinal game played on August 15, 1972 to advance to the final.

=== New York Cosmos ===
The New York Cosmos qualified for the playoffs by winning the Northern Division with 77 points. They also had the highest point-total in the NASL, and therefore were guaranteed home field throughout the playoffs. They defeated the defending champion Dallas Tornado, 1–0, in a semifinal game played on August 19, 1972 to advance to the final.

== Game summary ==
The Cosmos took an early lead after league MVP Randy Horton headed winger Roby Young's corner kick off the crossbar and in at 4:23. The lead would be last through the intermission, until Casey Frankiewicz, the Stars' player/coach, tied the game seven minutes after the restart. Frankiewicz's goal was the source of some controversy as referee Roger Schott initially ruled the play offside. Multiple Stars players appealed to linesman Bill Maxwell who ruled the play good. Schott subsequently reversed his decision and allowed the goal to stand.

Late in the rain-soaked game with New York applying pressure, Cosmos' midfielder John Kerr was fouled in the penalty area by St. Louis defender Gary Rensing. Schott promptly awarded New York a penalty, which Josef Jelínek buried at 4:19 from time. Two minutes later with tempers flaring, as St. Louis pressed for the equalizer, Cosmos defender Werner Roth was sent off, leaving New York a man short for the final two minutes of the match. In a furious push at the end, forward Willy Roy found the net for St. Louis with only thirteen second remaining. Like before, Roger Schott again ruled the Stars offside. But unlike the previous occasion, the Stars' appeals to both the referee and linesman fell on deaf ears this time, giving New York the title.

=== Championship results ===
August 26
8:00 p.m. EDT

New York Cosmos	2–1	St. Louis Stars
Horton 5'; Jelínek 86' (pen.)	Report 1 Report 2	Frankiewicz 52' (Sewell)

Hofstra Stadium, Hempstead, New York
Attendance: 6,102
Referee: Roger Schott (United States)

NY Cosmos	SL Stars

GK	0	(England) Richard Blackmore
DF	19	(Poland) Karol Kapienski
DF	4	(United States) Werner Roth	(red card) 88'
DF	22	(Poland) Dieter Zajdel
DF	2	(United States) Barry Mahy (c)
MF	6	(Canada) John Kerr
MF	15	(United States) Sigi Stritzl
MF	10	(Czechoslovakia) Josef Jelínek		Substituted off
FW	16	(Bermuda) Randy Horton	Booked
FW	17	(Ghana) Willie Mfum		Substituted off
FW	8	(Israel) Roby Young
Substitutes:
FW	20	(Trinidad and Tobago) Everald Cummings		Substituted on
DF	24	(United States) Gordon Bradley		Substituted on
Manager:
(United States) Gordon Bradley

GK	1	(United States) Mike Winter
DF	2	(England) John Sewell
DF	3	(England) Wilf Tranter
DF	15	(United States) Steve Frank	Substituted off
DF	5	(Poland) Joe Puls
MF	8	(United States) Pat McBride
MF	16	(United States) Gary Rensing
MF	7	(United States) Larry Hausmann
FW	11	(Poland) Casey Frankiewicz
FW	20	(United States) Gene Geimer
FW	10	(United States) Willy Roy
Substitutes:
MF	19	(Ghana) Yaw Kankam	Substituted on
Manager:
(Poland) Casey Frankiewicz

1972 NASL Champions: New York Cosmos

Man of the Match:

Assistant referees:
(United States) Bill Maxwell
(United States) Bob Sumpter

=== Statistics ===
Statistic	New York	St. Louis
Goals scored	2	1
Total shots	28	23
Shots on target	9	8
Saves	7	7
Corner kicks	5	10
Fouls	20	19
Offsides	1	3
Yellow cards	1	0
Red cards	1	0

== See also ==
- 1972 North American Soccer League season
