= 1972 North American Soccer League season =

Soccer league season

North American Soccer League 1972 season
- Season: 1972
- Teams: 8
- Champions: New York Cosmos
- Premiers: New York Cosmos
- Matches: 56
- Goals: 156 (2.79 per match)
- Top goalscorer: (Bermuda) Randy Horton (9 goals)
- Longest winning run: 5, St. Louis Stars
- Highest attendance: 24,742 (Mosc. Dynamo @ Dallas)
- Lowest attendance: 1,100 (Dallas @ Montreal)
- Average attendance: 5,340

Statistics of North American Soccer League in season 1972. This was the 5th season of the NASL.

== Overview ==
Eight teams took part in the league with the New York Cosmos winning the championship.

== Changes from previous season ==
=== Rules changes ===
The league changed its offside rule during the season on June 26. They created a "Blue Line" which was an offside line across the field, 35 yards from the goal line. Thereafter, no player could be offside unless he had crossed the 35-yard line. This made the NASL unique in the soccer world; the league received temporary approval for the change from FIFA on an experimental basis only. The league also switched the playoff format to single-match elimination contests rather than series.

=== New teams ===
- None

=== Teams folding ===
- None

=== Teams moving ===
- Washington Darts to Miami Gatos

=== Name changes ===
- None

== Map of clubs ==
Northern Division Southern Division

== Regular season ==
W = Wins, L = Losses, T= Ties, GF = Goals For, GA = Goals Against, PT= point system

6 points for a win, 3 points for a tie, 0 points for a loss, 1 point for each goal scored up to three per game.

-Premiers (most points). -Other playoff teams.

Northern Division	W	L	T	GF	GA	PT
New York Cosmos	7	3	4	28	16	77
Rochester Lancers	6	5	3	20	22	64
Montreal Olympique	4	5	5	19	20	57
Toronto Metros	4	6	4	18	22	53

Southern Division	W	L	T	GF	GA	PT
St. Louis Stars	7	4	3	20	14	69
Dallas Tornado	6	5	3	15	12	60
Atlanta Chiefs	5	6	3	19	18	56
Miami Gatos	3	8	3	17	32	44

== NASL All-Stars ==
First Team	Position	Second Team	Honorable Mention
(England) Ken Cooper, Dallas	G	(Canada) Dick Howard, Toronto	(Bermuda) Sam Nusum, Montreal
(United States) John Best, Dallas	D	(United States) Dick Hall, Dallas	(Italy) Adolfo Gori, Rochester
(England) John Sewell, St. Louis	D	(England) Clive Charles, Montreal	(Scotland) Charlie Mitchell, Rochester
(England) Peter Short, Rochester	D	(England) Wilf Tranter, St. Louis	(England) John Cocking, Atlanta
(Ghana) Willie Evans, Miami	D	(Scotland) Brian Rowan, Toronto	(Poland) Joe Puls, St. Louis
(Canada) John Kerr, New York	M	(Argentina) Francisco Escos, Rochester	(United States) Mick Hoban, Atlanta
(Scotland) Graeme Souness, Montreal	M	(England) Dave Metchick, Miami	(United States) Larry Hausmann, St. Louis
(United States) Pat McBride, St. Louis	M	(United States) Siggy Stritzl, New York	(Scotland) Billy Fraser, Miami
(Bermuda) Randy Horton, New York	F	(United States) Carlos Metidieri, Rochester	(United States) Mike Renshaw, Dallas
(United States) Paul Child, Atlanta	F	(Jamaica) Art Welch, Atlanta	(Trinidad and Tobago) Warren Archibald, Miami
(England) Michael Dillon, Montreal	F	(United States) Jorge Siega, New York	(Poland) Casey Frankiewicz, St. Louis

== Playoffs ==
All playoff games in all rounds including the NASL Final were single game elimination match ups.

=== Bracket ===
Semifinals
N1	New York Cosmos	1
S2	Dallas Tornado	0
S1	St. Louis Stars	2
N2	Rochester Lancers	0

NASL Final 1972
N1	New York Cosmos	2
S1	St. Louis Stars	1

=== Semifinals ===
August 15	Rochester Lancers	0–2	St. Louis Stars	Busch Memorial Stadium • Att. 5,319

August 19	Dallas Tornado	0–1	New York Cosmos	Hofstra Stadium • Att. 5,026

=== NASL Final 1972 ===
August 26
8 pm EDT

New York Cosmos	2–1	St. Louis Stars
Horton 5' (Young); Jelinek 86' (pen.)	Report	Frankiewicz 52' (Sewell)

Hofstra Stadium, Hempstead, New York
Attendance: 6,102
Referee: Roger Schott (USA)

1972 NASL Champions: New York Cosmos

== Post season awards ==
- Most Valuable Player: (Bermuda) Randy Horton, New York
- Coach of the year: (Poland) Casey Frankiewicz, St. Louis
- Rookie of the year: (United States) Mike Winter, St. Louis

Team	Average
St. Louis Stars	7,773
Toronto Metros	7,173
Rochester Lancers	5,505
Atlanta Chiefs	5,034
New York Cosmos	4,282
Dallas Tornado	4,093
Montreal Olympique	2,308
Miami Gatos	2,112
