= Al Trost =

American soccer player & coach (born 1949)

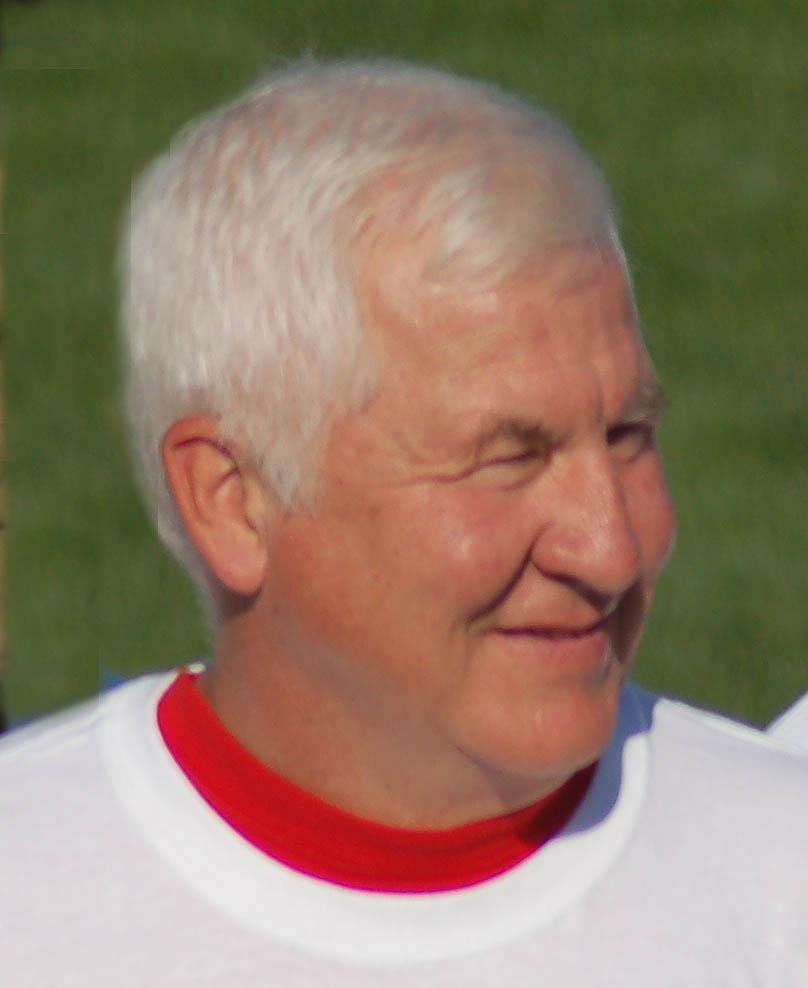

Personal information
- Full name: Alan Philip Trost
- Date of birth: February 7, 1949 (age 77)
- Place of birth: St. Louis, Missouri, United States
- Height: 6 ft 2 in (1.88 m)
- Position: Midfielder

College career
Years	Team	Apps	(Gls)
1967–1970	St. Louis University		

Senior career*
Years	Team	Apps	(Gls)
1973–1977	St Louis Stars	108	(27)
1978	California Surf	28	(10)
1979	Seattle Sounders	11	(1)
1979–1980	New York Arrows (indoor)	27	(3)

International career
1973–1978	United States	14	(1)

Managerial career
- McCluer North High School
- 1981–1983: St. Louis Steamers
- Parkway South High School
- * Club domestic league appearances and goals

Alan Trost (born February 7, 1949) is an American former professional soccer player who played as a midfielder. He played collegiate soccer at Saint Louis University where he won the 1969 and 1970 Hermann Trophy as the player of the year. His professional career includes years in both the North American Soccer League (NASL) and Major Indoor Soccer League (MISL). He also was a member of the 1972 U.S. Olympic soccer team. He went on to earn 14 caps with the U.S. national team, scoring one goal. He coached professionally with the St. Louis Steamers of MISL and continues to coach youth soccer. He is a member of the National Soccer Hall of Fame.

== Early life and college ==
Al Trost grew up in St. Louis, Missouri and attended high school at St. Louis Preparatory Seminary in Shrewsbury, MO, where he also starred on the soccer team.

Trost attended Saint Louis University where he led the Billikens to the 1969 and 1970 NCAA championships. In 1967, Trost's freshman year, St. Louis made it to the title game, which was ended due to weather with the score 0–0. St. Louis and Michigan State were declared co-champions that season. In 1969, Trost earned NCAA Tournament Offensive MVP honors. Trost was also a two-time Hermann Trophy recipient as the collegiate player of the year in 1969 and 1970. He was selected as a first-team All-American in 1970. On September 30, 2009, Trost was named to SLU's Half-Century Team.

== Olympics and national teams ==
While Trost finished his collegiate career in 1970, he chose not to turn pro in order to be eligible for the 1972 Summer Olympics. The U.S. began qualification for the games in 1971 and Trost was an integral part of the Olympic team, playing eight of the U.S.'s eleven games. He scored twice, first in the August 22, 1971, 3–1 victory over and the next game, a September 18 1–0 victory over El Salvador. Trost played two of the three games at the Munich Olympics, the 0–0 tie with Morocco and the crushing 0–7 defeat at the hands of West Germany.

Trost continued playing for the national team after the Olympics. He earned his first cap, and scored his only goal, with the senior team on August 12, 1973, in a 1–0 victory over Poland. He went on to captain the U.S. through the failed 1974 and 1978 World Cup qualifying campaigns. His last game with the national team came against Portugal in Lisbon on September 20, 1978.

== NASL ==
In 1973, Trost began his professional playing career with the St. Louis Stars of the North American Soccer League. He had been drafted by the Stars in the 1968 college draft, but the near-collapse of the NASL and Trost's desire to maintain his amateur eligibility kept him from signing until 1973.

After the 1977 season, the Stars gave up on St Louis and moved to Anaheim, California, to play the 1978 season as the California Surf. Trost led the Surf in scoring, but the team traded him to the Seattle Sounders in January 1979 for Tony Chursky. Trost played the 1979 season with the Sounders, scoring one goal in 11 games. On September 28, 1979, Trost left the Sounders and the NASL. During his time in the league, he was a second-team All Star in 1976 and received honorable mention in 1973 and 1977. Trost ended his NASL career as No. 72 on the points list with 100 off 38 goals and 24 assists.

== MISL ==
After leaving the NASL, Trost played a single season for the New York Arrows of Major Indoor Soccer League in 1979–1980. In 1981, the St. Louis Steamers hired Trost to replace Pat McBride, who left the team in a contract dispute during the 1980–1981 post-season. Trost continued coaching the Steamers during the 1981–1982 season when he took the team to the MISL championship series, which it lost to Trost's old team, the New York Arrows. When the team began the 1982–1983 season with a record of 5–9, Trost was fired on January 4, 1983.

== High school coaching ==
Trost began his coaching career with the McCluer North High School (Florissant, Missouri) boys' soccer team, while playing for the St. Louis Stars. In 1974, he led the team to victory in the Missouri state championship. He also coached the Parkway South High School boys' and girls' soccer teams from 1995 to 2016, accumulating more than 350 wins and 60 ties with both teams. He is still active in the St. Louis soccer community as he continues to coach soccer camps in the area.

In 1994, he was inducted into the Saint Louis University Athletics Hall of Fame. In 2006, he was inducted into the National Soccer Hall of Fame.
