= California Surf =

Defunct American soccer club

- Full name: California Surf
- Nickname: The Surf
- Founded: 1978
- Dissolved: 1981
- Stadium: Anaheim Stadium 69,008; Indoor: Anaheim Convention Center 5,400 (1979–80); Long Beach Arena 10,600 (1980–81)
- League: North American Soccer League
| Home colors | Away colors |

The California Surf was an American soccer team that competed in the North American Soccer League (NASL) from 1978 to 1981. The team was based in Anaheim, California and played their home games at Anaheim Convention Center and the Long Beach Arena during the indoor seasons and Anaheim Stadium for outdoor matches. Originally founded as the St. Louis Stars, the team relocated to Anaheim after the 1977 NASL season. The team disbanded after the 1981 NASL season.

== History ==
The team that would become the Surf was originally founded as the St. Louis Stars in 1967 as a charter member of the National Professional Soccer League. When the NPSL and United Soccer Association merged to form the North American Soccer League (NASL), the Stars moved to the new league and competed in an additional 10 seasons. After the conclusion of the 1977 season, team president Ted Martin announced that unless other adequate stadium facilities could be secured, as Francis Field on the campus of Washington University-where the team has played its home games for the previous three seasons-was too small to accommodate the larger crowds attending it games and the team's inability to use Busch Memorial Stadium because of scheduling conflicts with Major League Baseball's Cardinals, the team would have to relocate to another city. In late September 1977, General Manager Case Frankiewiez announced the team would leave the city with Anaheim, California and Columbus, Ohio name as likely destinations. A week later on October 7, 1977, the NASL officially approved the team's move pending a lease with Anaheim Stadium. Two months later, it was announced that the name Surf has been chosen from 350 public suggestions.

The Surf opened the 1978 North American Soccer League season at home with a 1–0 victory against the Portland Timbers on April 1, 1978. The team finished the season in second place in the Western Division of the American Conference with 13 wins and 17 losses and losing to the San Diego Sockers in the first round of the playoffs. After a 4–4 start to the 1979 season, John Sewell, who had managed the team in St. Louis, was fired as head coach and replaced by Peter Wall. The Surf finished the season with a record of 15 wins and 15 losses, tied for first place of the American Conference, Western Division on points with San Diego, but losing the division title on goal differential. For the second year in a row, the team exited the playoffs after losing to San Diego in the first round. The team reported an official average attendance of 10,330 for the season; however, it was midway through the following season, it was reported that the Surf had been inflating their attendance totals. In September 1979 it was announced that the Surf would be one of ten teams to participate in the 1979–80 NASL Indoor season. During the league's first ever full indoor season, the Surf compiled a record of four wins and eight losses and failed to qualify for the playoffs. In the following outdoor season, the Surf compiled a record of 15 wins and 17 losses while finishing in second place in the Western Division of the American Conference. The team was defeated in the first round of the playoffs by the Fort Lauderdale Strikers. After the season, it was announced that the team had ranked 20th in league attendance and was rumored to have lost nearly $7.5 million. The Surf competed in the 1980–81 NASL Indoor season finishing first in the Southern Division, but again bowing out in the first round of the playoffs, this time to the Vancouver Whitecaps. After opening the 1981 NASL season, with a 4 – 3 record, Peter Wall resigned as head coach and was replaced by Laurie Calloway. The team finished the season with a record of 11 wins and 21 losses and did not qualify for the playoffs. On September 15, 1981, it was announced the team was ceasing operations. The next day, the league announced the Surf were one of five teams that failed to post the required $150,000 bond to participate in the 1981–82 NASL Indoor season, confirming the team has folded.

== Ownership and staff ==
- Robert Hermann & Partners – Owners (1978–1980)
- Henry Segerstrom & Partners – Owners (1980–1981)
- Lynne Saunders – Deputy General Manager

== Head coaches ==
- (England) John Sewell (1978–1979)
- (England) Peter Wall (1979–1981)
- (England) Laurie Calloway 1981

== Year-by-year ==
| Year | League | W | L | Pts | Regular season | Playoffs | Avg. Attend. |
|---|---|---|---|---|---|---|---|
| 1978 | NASL | 13 | 17 | 115 | 2nd, American Conference, Western Division | Lost 1st Round (San Diego) | 11,171 |
| 1979 | NASL | 15 | 15 | 140 | T1st, American Conference, Western Division | Lost 1st Round (San Diego) | 10,330 |
| 1979–80 | NASL Indoor | 4 | 8 | — | 4th, Western Division | did not qualify | 3,181 |
| 1980 | NASL | 15 | 17 | 144 | 2nd, American Conference, Western Division | Lost 1st Round (Ft. Lauderdale) | 7,593 |
| 1980–81 | NASL Indoor | 10 | 8 | — | 1st, Southern Division | Lost 1st Round (Vancouver) | 4,249 |
| 1981 | NASL | 11 | 21 | 117 | 3rd, Western Division | did not qualify | 8,299 |

== Honors ==
NASL Division titles

- 1978 Western Division, American Conference (tie)
- 1980–81 indoor Southern Division

NASL All-Star First Team

- 1978 Ray Evans

U.S. Soccer Hall of Fame

- 2001: Bob Hermann
- 2003: Carlos Alberto Torres
- 2006: Al Trost

Canada Soccer Hall of Fame

- 2004: Tony Chursky

Indoor Soccer Hall of Fame

- 2019: Alan Mayer
