= Frankiewicz =

Frankiewicz is a Polish surname. Notable people with the surname include:

- Kazimierz Frankiewicz (born 1939), Polish footballer
- Wioletta Frankiewicz (born 1977), Polish athlete
- Zygmunt Frankiewicz (born 1955), Polish politician
