= Bob Kehoe =

American soccer player (1928–2017)

Personal information
- Date of birth: 1928
- Place of birth: St. Louis, Missouri, United States
- Date of death: September 4, 2017 (aged 89)
- Position: Defender

Senior career*
Years	Team	Apps	(Gls)
- St. Louis Kutis
1968	St. Louis Stars	1	(0)

International career
1965	United States	4	(0)

Managerial career
- 1969–1970: St. Louis Stars
- 1972: United States
- 1973–1983: Granite City North High School
- * Club domestic league appearances and goals

Robert V. Kehoe (1928 – September 4, 2017) was an American soccer player who played as a defender. He earned four caps as captain of the U.S. national team in 1965. He later coached the U.S. national team in 1972. He was also the first U.S. born coach in the North American Soccer League. He was inducted into the National Soccer Hall of Fame in 1989.

== Club career ==
Kehoe grew up in St. Louis and graduated from St. Louis University High School in 1947. He played on the school's first soccer team in 1943. After high school, he spent time in the Philadelphia Phillies farm system, but soon returned to soccer. When he did, he joined St. Louis Kutis. In 1968, he played with the St. Louis Stars of the North American Soccer League (NASL)

== International career ==
Kehoe earned his four caps as captain of the U.S. national team during 1966 FIFA World Cup qualifying in 1965. His first game with the national team came in a 2–2 tie with Mexico on March 7, 1965. Kehoe and his teammates then lost to Mexico five days later, defeated Honduras on March 17 and tied them four days later. With a 1–1–2 record, the U.S. failed to qualify for the finals.

== Coaching career ==
In 1969, Kehoe moved from player to coach with the St. Louis Stars. He became the first U.S.-born coach in the NASL in the 1969 and 1970 season. During his two seasons as head coach, he used rosters of predominantly U.S. born players, unlike most other coaches in the NASL.

In 1972, the U.S. Soccer Federation hired Kehoe as coach of the U.S. national team.

In 1973, he became the head coach of Granite City North High School where he joined former teammate Ruben Mendoza as a developer of local youth players. He remained with the school until 1983. That year, he became the head coach of the Bud Light women's over-30 team. The Bud team went to the women's over 30 national championship game every year from 1983 to 1988. During those years, Kehoe also served as the Director of Coaching for the Busch Soccer Club.

== Broadcasting career ==
In addition to coaching the Bud Women's team and acting as the Director of Coaching for the Busch Soccer Club, Kehoe was a radio and TV commentator for the St. Louis Steamers of Major Indoor Soccer League from 1983 to 1988.

== Honors ==
Kehoe was inducted into the St. Louis Soccer Hall of Fame on October 26, 1983, the Illinois High School Soccer Coaches Association Hall of Fame in 1989 and the National Soccer Hall of Fame in 1989.
