= Gary Rensing =

American soccer player and coach

Personal information
- Date of birth: October 5, 1947 (age 79)
- Place of birth: St. Louis, Missouri, U.S.
- Position: Defender

Youth career
- 1967–1969: St. Louis University

Senior career*
Years	Team	Apps	(Gls)
1970–1977	St Louis Stars	148	(0)
1978	Chicago Sting	16	(0)

International career
1972	United States	4	(0)

Managerial career
- STLCC-Forest Park
- * Club domestic league appearances and goals

Gary Rensing is an American retired soccer defender who played nine seasons in the North American Soccer League and earned four caps with the U.S. national team.

== Player ==
=== Youth ===
Rensing attended St. Louis University where he was a member of the men's soccer team from 1967 to 1969. In 1967, the Billikens shared the national title with the Michigan State Spartans after the game was called after 42 minutes of scoreless overtime for deteriorating weather conditions. In 1969, the team won the title with a 4–0 victory over the University of San Francisco.

=== NASL ===
In 1970, the St Louis Stars of the North American Soccer League (NASL) signed Rensing out of college. He went on to play eight seasons with the Stars before the team folded at the end of the 1977 season. Rensing then moved to the Chicago Sting for the 1978 season. Rensing retired at the end of the 1978 season.

=== National team ===
Rensing earned four caps, all of them World Cup qualifiers, in 1972. The U.S. went 0-3-1 and failed to qualify for the cup finals. While Rensing played all four games, he never played an entire game. He came off for Larry Hausmann in the August 20, 1972 loss to Canada, his first with the national team and he came on for Walner Mata in the September 10, 1972 loss to Mexico, his last game with the national team.

== Coach ==
Rensing has also coached with Forest Park Community College.

Rensing was inducted into the St. Louis Soccer Hall of Fame in 2001.
