= Willy Roy =

American soccer player

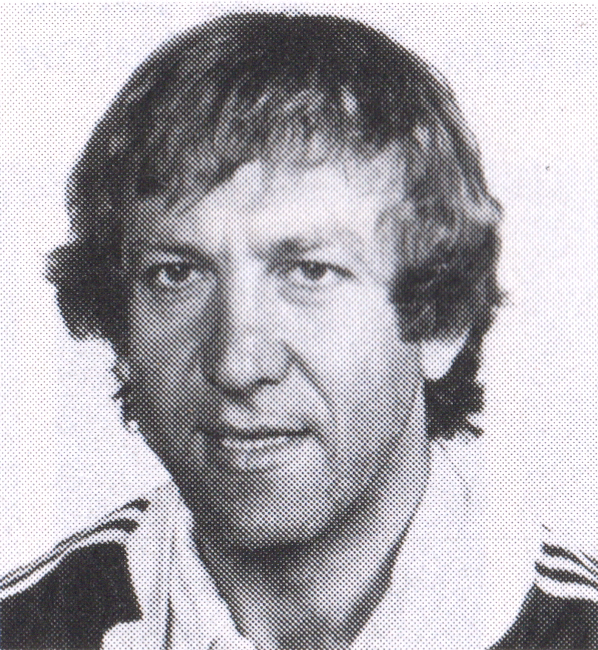
- Roy circa 1984

Personal information
- Full name: Willy Roy
- Date of birth: February 8, 1943 (age 83)
- Place of birth: Treuberg, Nazi Germany
- Height: 6 ft 0 in (1.83 m)
- Position: Forward

Senior career*
Years	Team	Apps	(Gls)
1964–1966	Hansa		
1967–1968	Chicago Spurs	27	(17)
1968	Kansas City Spurs	15	(6)
1971–1974	Saint Louis Stars	43	(18)
1975	Ukrainian Lions		
1975	Chicago Sting	14	(0)

International career^{‡}
1965–1973	United States	20	(9)

Managerial career
- 1977–1986: Chicago Sting
- 1987–2002: Northern Illinois Huskies
- * Club domestic league appearances and goals as of May 31, 2006 ‡ National team caps and goals as of June 22, 2006

Willy Roy (born February 8, 1943) is an American retired soccer forward and coach. He played for several teams in the National Professional Soccer League and the North American Soccer League in the 1960s and 1970s, as well as the United States national team from 1965 to 1973. He is a member of the National Soccer Hall of Fame.

== Early years ==
When Roy was six, his family moved to the United States from Germany, settling in Chicago. After attending Reavis High School and winning the 1961 IHSA Wrestling Team State Championship and individual 145 lb State Championship in what is now Burbank, Illinois, he began playing semi-pro soccer in the Chicago area. In 1964, he joined Hansa of the National Soccer League of Chicago. In 1966, Hansa won the Peter J. Peel Challenge Cup as the Illinois State Champion. The year prior, the team lost to the New York Ukrainians in the National Challenge Cup.

== Professional career ==
The year 1966 saw a series of events that had a major impact on Roy's future career. Three separate groups decided to form a professional league in the U.S. Through various negotiations, two of the groups merged to form the National Professional Soccer League (NPSL). While the USSF and FIFA refused to recognize the NPSL, it gained a television contract with CBS, thereby guaranteeing some element of financial stability.

Up to this point, Roy played almost exclusively with local Chicago minor league teams and the U.S. national team.

Once again, external soccer events impacted Roy's career. The NPSL merged with the United Soccer Association in December 1967 to form the North American Soccer League. That year, the Spurs also moved to Kansas City. Roy moved with the team and spent one season there. Roy experienced a sophomore slump in 1968, playing 15 games, scoring 6 goals and assisting on 4 others. However, the team played well, losing to the Atlanta Chiefs in the playoff semifinals.

Roy moved on to the Saint Louis Stars (NASL) in 1971. In his three seasons with the Stars, he scored 18 goals and assisted on 16 others. In 1972, the team made it to the NASL final, losing to the New York Cosmos 2–1.

After retiring from the national team, Roy continued to play professionally for a few more years. In 1975, he moved to his last team, the expansion Chicago Sting. He would play a single season with the Sting, statistically the worst of his career. He scored no goals and made 3 assists in 14 games. He retired from playing at the end of the season.

== U.S. national team ==
In 1965, Roy made his debut with the United States national team in a 1966 FIFA World Cup qualification match against Mexico in Mexico City, a 2-0 loss. He earned his second cap nine days later in a tie with Honduras which ended the U.S. attempt to qualify for the 1966 World Cup.

Roy enjoyed relative success with the national team in 1968. He played eight games, scoring six goals. In those eight games, the national team went 4–3–1. More significantly, four of those games were qualifying matches for the 1970 FIFA World Cup. In those three games, the U.S. went 3–1 with Roy scoring 3 goals. The next year, he played only a single game with the national team, a 2–0 loss to Haiti. That game, combined with a second loss to Haiti a month later spelled the end to yet another U.S. attempt to qualify for a World Cup. Roy would not play for the national team again until it began playing qualification games for the 1974 World Cup.

In 1972, Roy played four games with the national team, all 1974 World Cup qualifying matches. The U.S. went 0–3–1, failing to reach yet another World Cup. Despite the team's dismal showing, Roy scored in three consecutive games, giving him a record six goals in World Cup qualifying matches. The next player to score in three consecutive matches did not come until Cobi Jones did it in 2000. Roy's record of six goals in world cup qualifying matches lasted until Earnie Stewart scored his seventh qualifying goal in 2001.

Roy played five more games with the national team, all in 1973. That year, he scored once, ending his national team career with 20 games and 10 goals, one of the best scoring rates by any national team member over a sustained career.

=== International goals ===
#	Date	Venue	Opponent	Score	Result	Competition
1	September 15, 1968	New York, New York	Israel	1–2	3–3	Friendly
2	October 13, 1968	Toronto, Canada	Canada	1–0	2–4	1970 World Cup Qualifying
3	October 20, 1968	Port-au-Prince, Haiti	Haiti	?	6–3	Friendly
4	November 2, 1968	Kansas City, Missouri	Bermuda	4–2	6–2	1970 World Cup Qualifying
5	November 10, 1968	Hamilton, Bermuda	Bermuda	2–0	2–0	1970 World Cup Qualifying
6	August 20, 1972	St. John's, Canada	Canada	1–3	2–3	1974 World Cup Qualifying
7	August 29, 1972	Baltimore, Maryland	Canada	1–1	2–2	1974 World Cup Qualifying
8	September 3, 1972	Mexico City, Mexico	Mexico	1–3	1–3	1974 World Cup Qualifying
9	November 13, 1973	Tel-Aviv, Israel	Israel	1–1	1–3	Friendly

== Coaching career ==
In 1976, upon retiring from playing, Roy became an assistant coach for Chicago Sting. He spent two seasons in this position, before moving up to head coach in 1979. In 1981, Roy coached the Sting to a 23–9 record and a victory in the Soccer Bowl (the NASL championship game) and earned himself NASL Coach of the Year honors. The summer of 1984 saw Roy coach the Sting to its second NASL outdoor title. This would also be the last NASL championship as the league folded the following Spring.

The Major Indoor Soccer League had commenced operations in 1978, and it proved its success in its first two years of operation as it gained teams and the NASL lost teams to financial failure. The NASL attempted to piggyback on the MISL success, by playing an indoor season beginning in the winter of 1979–1980, following its 1979 outdoor season. Roy's Sting did not do well in that first season indoors, but things improved drastically during the 1980–1981 indoor season. He guided them to a division title, the league's best regular-season record, and into the finals, where they lost to the Edmonton Drillers, two games to none. The following season (1981–82) saw another division title, but this time they made an early exit from the playoffs. The NASL did not hold a full indoor season in 1982–83, so the Sting played that winter in the MISL where it finished third in the Eastern Division. Roy got the Sting on track during the 1983–84 indoor season, back again in the NASL. They finished second in the standings and lost to the New York Cosmos (1971–1985) in the playoff semifinals. With the demise of the NASL, the Sting became a full-time member of the MISL.

Roy coached the Sting for two more seasons. The team lost to the Cleveland Force in the 1985 quarterfinals but missed the playoffs in 1986, finishing with a 23–25 record. A 2–8 start the following campaign led to Roy being replaced by Erich Geyer on December 23, 1986.

During his time with the Sting, Roy did more than win two championships. He had an impact that went beyond the team when he coached the former Dutch National Team Head Coach Dick Advocaat and United States women's national soccer team Greg Ryan. Ryan later credited Roy with being a strong influence on his development as a player and coach. Ryan said, "The thing that defined Willy was, he was one of the most intense competitors as a player and that carried over to his coaching. He was so intense and so determined that he brought that quality out in his players. If he mentioned people who went on to bigger and better things, it was because they learned to work so hard and give so much."

Roy was named the men's soccer head coach at Northern Illinois University on August 12, 1987. In 1990, the Huskies had the Mid-Continent Conference's best record and Roy was selected as the Mid-Con's Coach of the Year.

The school announced on February 18, 2003, that it was not renewing Roy's contract after the Huskies had three consecutive losing seasons. He finished with a 142–131–22 coaching record and two conference championships. During his time with the team, it was known for the high academic standards Roy set for his players. Although his last season with the team saw a dismal 4–13–1, the Huskies ranked in the Division-I Academic top 20.

== Later years ==
In 1989, Roy was elected to the National Soccer Hall of Fame.

He currently owns and helps his family run the Willy Roy Soccer Dome, an indoor soccer arena in Chicago, Now in his eighties, he continues to support the many players and leagues at the Soccer Dome.

In 1979, he wrote the book Coaching Winning Soccer.

== Honors ==
=== Player ===
- NASL Champion: 1972 (runner-up)
- Division Title: 1968, 1972

=== Manager ===
- NASL Champion: 1981, 1984
- NASL premiership: 1984
- Division Title: 1980, 1981, 1984
- NASL Champion indoor: 1980–81 (runner-up)
- NASL premiership indoor: 1980–81
- Indoor Division Title: 1980–81, 1981–82

=== Individual ===
- Rookie of the Year: 1967
- First Team All-Star: 1967
- Coach of the Year: 1981
- National Soccer Hall of Fame: 1989
