= János Bédl =

Hungarian football manager (1929–1987)

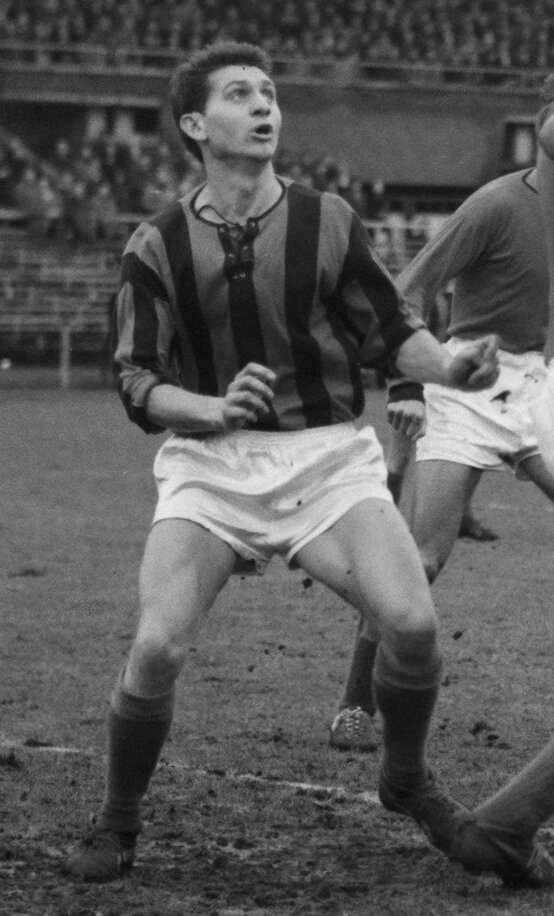
- Bédl playing for DWS in 1962

Personal information
- Date of birth: 10 September 1929
- Place of birth: Hungary
- Date of death: 9 December 1987 (aged 58)
- Place of death: Essen, West Germany
- Position: Midfielder

Senior career*
Years	Team	Apps	(Gls)
1959–1960	Be Quick 1887		
1960–1962	DWS		
1963–1964	MVV		
1964–1965	Sliema Wanderers		

Managerial career
- Sliema Wanderers
- 1966: Malta
- 1967: Pittsburgh Phantoms
- 1968–1969: Kansas City Spurs
- 1971–1972: Rot-Weiss Essen
- 1972–1973: Lierse
- 1973–1974: Borussia Dortmund
- 1974–1975: Wuppertaler SV Borussia
- 1975–1977: Lierse
- 1981–1982: Lierse
- 1983–1984: Rot-Weiss Essen
- 1986–1987: Rot-Weiß Oberhausen
- * Club domestic league appearances and goals

János Bédl (10 September 1929 – 9 December 1987) was a Hungarian football player and manager.

== Managerial career ==
In 1967, Bédl managed the Pittsburgh Phantoms of the National Professional Soccer League. In 1968, the NSPL merged with the United Soccer Association to form the North American Soccer League. Bédl then coached the Kansas City Spurs in 1968 and 1969. He was the 1968 NASL Coach of the Year and led Kansas City to the 1969 premiership. He also coached the Malta national team from 13 February 1966 to 27 March 1966, as well as the Maltese team Sliema Wanderers and Belgian club Lierse S.K.

== Death ==
Bédl died in a car accident in Essen, West Germany.
