= Rensing =

Rensing is a surname. Notable people with the surname include:

- Damon Rensing, American soccer coach
- Gary Rensing (born 1947), American soccer player
- Michael Rensing (born 1984), German football player
