= 4th Soccer Bowl =

The 4th Soccer Bowl may refer to:

- NASL Final 1972, the fourth championship game of the original North American Soccer League
- Soccer Bowl '78, the fourth championship game of the original North American Soccer League that used the "Soccer Bowl" moniker
- Soccer Bowl 2014, the fourth championship game of the second North American Soccer League
