= Jim Leeker =

American soccer player

Personal information
- Date of birth: April 10, 1947 (age 79)
- Place of birth: St. Louis, Missouri, United States
- Position: Forward

Youth career
- 1966–1969: St. Louis University

Senior career*
Years	Team	Apps	(Gls)
1965–1969	St. Louis Kutis S.C.		
1970–1972	St. Louis Stars	46	(8)
1971	St. Louis Stars (indoor)	2	(1)
1972–	St. Louis Kutis S.C.		
- * Club domestic league appearances and goals

Jim Leeker (born St. Louis, Missouri) is a former U.S. soccer player and the current president of the St. Louis Soccer Hall of Fame. He was the 1970 North American Soccer League Rookie of the Year and went on to play a total of three seasons in the league.

In 1965, Leeker joined St. Louis Kutis S.C. He then went on to attend St. Louis University where he played on the men's soccer team from 1966 to 1969. In 1969, Leeker and his teammates won the NCAA Men's Soccer Championship. In 1970, Leeker signed with the St. Louis Stars of the North American Soccer League (NASL). That year, he played in twenty-two games and scored five goals as he was named the NASL Rookie of the Year. On March 19, 1971, Leeker scored the first goal in NASL indoor history in the eighth minute of the opening match of the NASL's "Hoc-Soc" Tournament played at the St. Louis Arena. He continued to play for the Stars until 1972 when he left the NASL. After leaving the Stars, Leeker rejoined St. Louis Kutis where he was named the 1972 Khoury Professional Player of the Year.

Leeker was inducted into the St. Louis Soccer Hall of Fame in 1998.
