= Bob Hermann =

American businessman (1923–2020)

- Born: January 3, 1923
- Died: April 5, 2020 (aged 97); Ladue, Missouri, US
- Education: Princeton University
- Occupation: Businessman
- Spouse: Lilly Busch (died 1995)
- Relatives: August Anheuser "Gussie" Busch, Jr. (father-in-law)

Robert Ringen Hermann, Sr. (January 3, 1923 – April 5, 2020) was an American businessman, soccer executive from St. Louis, Missouri.

== Early life ==
Robert Ringen Hermann, Sr. was born January 3, 1923, to parents Frederick A. and Evelyn Ringen Hermann. He was raised in Clayton, Missouri and educated at St. Louis Country Day School (later merged to form MICDS). He graduated from Princeton University in 1944 with a degree in engineering, and was then commissioned as an ensign in the United States Navy, where he served as a flight deck officer on the USS Savo Island aircraft carrier during World War II.

Hermann was promoted to lieutenant later in the war, and his unit was awarded a Presidential Unit Citation, an honor for "extraordinary heroism in action against an armed enemy...gallantry, determination, and esprit de corps," and several other battle stars.

== Career ==
Following his time in the Navy, Hermann began a business career with the formation of Standard Container Company, a sales firm that sold boxboard packaging to breweries. The company later launched Anchor Packaging, a producer of cling-film and plastic food containers for takeout and delivery. Anchor Packaging is now one of North America's largest polypropylene food packaging thermoformers, with facilities in St. Louis, Missouri; Paragould, Marmaduke, and Jonesboro, Arkansas; and Buenos Aires, Argentina.

In later years, Hermann diversified his scope of business with the development of Hermann Marketing. He served as head of the company until his son, Robert R. Hermann, Jr., took over as CEO. Prior to its sale to Corporate Express (Staples), Hermann Marketing 's customers included United Airlines, IBM, UPS, and Texaco.

The family-operated Hermann Companies now focuses on private equity, and providing financial and investment services.

== Community involvement ==
Hermann served on the board of numerous civic, cultural, and charitable organizations including the St. Louis Zoological Park, Missouri Botanical Garden, St. Louis Public Library Foundation, Old Newsboys Day, BJC HealthCare, St. Louis Municipal Opera Theatre (Muny), Arts and Education Council, and St. Louis Symphony Orchestra.

Hermann also established several events and nonprofits in the St. Louis region, including:

- In 1981, he founded the Veiled Prophet (V.P.) Fair, now the Fair St. Louis, and aims to "unite the region in a joint effort to promote St. Louis to the country and the world."
- Hermann was a founding chairman of Operation Brightside, a not-for-profit organization which enhances public spaces in St. Louis through litter pickup, graffiti removal, and planting of community gardens.
- In collaboration with Peter H. Raven, former president of the Missouri Botanical Garden, and Whitney R. Harris, philanthropist, Hermann introduced the University of Missouri - St. Louis' International Center for Tropical Ecology, along with its corresponding World Ecology Award. The Award honors individuals who have made outstanding efforts in global conservation and has been presented annually since 1990.

In 1996, he was named “Man of the Year” by the St. Louis Variety Club and “Citizen of the Year” in 1999. He also received the St. Louis Award, presented annually to honor “the resident of Metropolitan St. Louis who, during the preceding year, has contributed the most outstanding service for its development.”

== Soccer executive ==
In 1966, Hermann sought to bring soccer to the US by forming the National Professional Soccer League (NPSL). The NPSL played for the 1967 season before merging with the United Soccer Association to form the North American Soccer League (NASL). Hermann was nominated as chairman of the executive committee.

Hermann was the founder and co-owner of the St. Louis Stars soccer team. The team played with the NPSL/NASL from 1968 to 1977. After 1977, the Stars moved to Anaheim, California and rebranded as the California Surf. Hermann continued as an owner until 1980.

Hermann's largest soccer legacy is the Hermann Trophy, established in his honor by the NPSL/NASL and is awarded annually to the best male and female college soccer players in the US. The soccer stadium of the St. Louis Billiken's soccer team, Robert R. Hermann Stadium (Hermann Stadium), was named after him.

Hermann was inducted into the National Soccer Hall of Fame in 2001 for his "philanthropy efforts and impact of the game of soccer in America," and the St. Louis Soccer Hall of Fame in 2012.

== Personal life ==
Hermann was married twice, to the late Lilly Busch Hermann until her death in 1995, daughter of August Anheuser "Gussie" Busch, Jr., and the late Mary Lee Marshall Hermann. He had three children.

Hermann died April 5, 2020, at the age of 97 in Ladue, Missouri.
