= Joseph Gruber =

Austrian footballer (1912–1967)

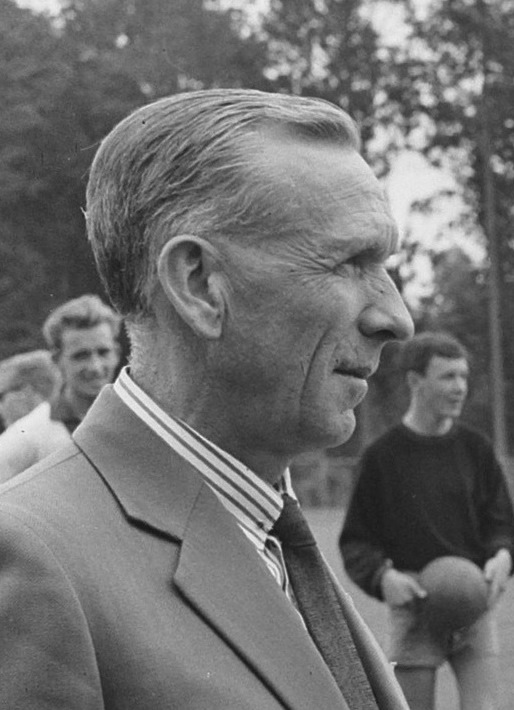
- Gruber in 1963

Personal information
- Full name: Joseph Karl Gruber
- Date of birth: 4 May 1912
- Place of birth: Vienna, Austria-Hungary
- Date of death: 29 September 1967 (aged 55)
- Place of death: Vienna, Austria
- Position: Midfielder

Senior career*
Years	Team	Apps	(Gls)
1930–1932	Austria Wien		
1932–1934	Le Havre		
1935	Floriana		
1938–1939	Alemannia Aachen		
1941–1942	Hamburger SV		
1944–1951	Alemannia Aachen		

Managerial career
- 1949: Alemannia Aachen
- 1954–1957: Vitesse Arnhem
- 1957–1959: DOS
- 1959–1961: DWS
- 1961–1962: DOS
- 1962–1963: Ajax
- 1964–1966: Vitesse Arnhem
- 1967: Pittsburgh Phantoms
- * Club domestic league appearances and goals

Joseph Karl Gruber (4 May 1912 – 29 September 1967) was an Austrian football player and manager. A midfielder, he played for Austria Wien, French club Le Havre, Maltese side Floriana and in Germany for Alemannia Aachen and Hamburger SV. He managed Dutch side Ajax between 1962 and 1963 and also coached Alemannia Aachen, DOS, Vitesse Arnhem Pittsburgh Phantoms.

== Personal life ==
Joseph was born in Vienna, the son of Viktoria Paiha and Joseph Gruber. He was married to Agnes Margarete Savelsberg.
