= Manfred Rummel =

German footballer (1938–2017)

Personal information
- Date of birth: 22 March 1938
- Place of birth: Essen, Germany
- Date of death: 27 July 2017 (aged 79)
- Position: Striker

Youth career
- FSV Kettwig

Senior career*
Years	Team	Apps	(Gls)
1958–1963	Schwarz-Weiß Essen		
1963–1964	Preußen Münster	27	(8)
1965–1967	1. FC Kaiserslautern	38	(15)
1967	Pittsburgh Phantoms	19	(14)
1968	Kansas City Spurs	28	(11)
Total		112+	(48+)

Managerial career
- 1975–1976: Bayer 04 Leverkusen
- 1981–1983: Schwarz-Weiß Essen
- * Club domestic league appearances and goals

Manfred Rummel (22 March 1938 – 27 July 2017) was a German professional football player and coach.

== Career ==
Born in Essen, Rummel joined Schwarz-Weiß Essen in 1958 from FSV Kettwig. He was part of the Schwarz-Weiß Essen which won the 1959 German Cup. He spent five years with the club, scoring 51 goals in 87 appearances. He also played for SC Preußen Münster and 1. FC Kaiserslautern. He later played in the United States with the Pittsburgh Phantoms and the Kansas City Spurs.

After retiring as a player, Rummel initially coached football to people with disabilities, before becoming manager of Schwarz-Weiß Essen in 1981, staying in that role until 1983. He held various other roles with the club, including being their managing director from 2006 to 2011. He also worked as the manager of Bayer Leverkusen, and as a coach at Rot-Weiss Essen.
