= National Professional Soccer League (1967) =

Soccer league

- Founded: 1967
- Folded: 1967; 59 years ago (merged with USA to form NASL in 1968)
- Country: United States
- Other club from: Canada
- Number of clubs: 10
- Last champions: Oakland Clippers (1967)
- Most championships: Oakland Clippers (1 title)
- Broadcaster(s): CBS

The National Professional Soccer League (NPSL) was a North American professional soccer league that existed for only the 1967 season before merging with the United Soccer Association (USA) to form the North American Soccer League. It was a "wild league", as it was not sanctioned by FIFA.

It had ten charter members, nine from the United States and one from Canada. To encourage attacking play, the NPSL introduced a new standings points system that was later used by the NASL – 6 points for a win, 3 for a draw, 0 for a loss and 1 bonus point for each of the first three goals scored. The circuit's commissioner was Ken Macker, an American publisher of three Philippines-based newspapers. The name National Professional Soccer League was revived in 1990 and used by a United States professional indoor soccer league.

== Origins ==
In 1966, a group of sports entrepreneurs led by Bill Cox and Robert Hermann formed a consortium called the North American Professional Soccer League with the intention of forming a professional soccer league in United States and Canada. However, this was just one of three groups with similar plans. The NAPSL eventually merged with one of these groups, the National Soccer League, led by Richard Millen, to form the National Professional Soccer League. A third group, the United Soccer Association was sanctioned by both the USSFA and FIFA. The NPSL did not receive sanctioning by the USSFA as they refused to pay the $25,000 fee, was branded an outlawed entity by FIFA, and players faced penalties for signing with it. Despite this the NPSL, which secured a TV contract from CBS, set about recruiting players, and announced it would be ready to launch in 1967.

=== Teams ===
Nat.	Team	Stadium	Capac.	Owner
(United States)	Atlanta Chiefs	Atlanta Stadium	50,893	William Bartholomay (Atlanta Braves)
(United States)	Baltimore Bays	Memorial Stadium	52,185	Jerold Hoffberger (Baltimore Orioles)
(United States)	Chicago Spurs	Soldier Field	100,000	William B. Cutler, Michael Butler
(United States)	Los Angeles Toros	Memorial Coliseum	93,000	Dan Reeves (Los Angeles Rams)
(United States)	New York Generals	Yankee Stadium	67,000	RKO General Inc., Elser Enterprises Inc.
(United States)	Oakland Clippers	Oakland Coliseum	53,000	Joseph O'Neill, H.T. Hilliard
(United States)	Philadelphia Spartans	Temple Stadium	20,000	John Rooney (Pittsburgh Steelers)
(United States)	Pittsburgh Phantoms	Forbes Field	35,714	Peter Block, Richard George (Pittsburgh Penguins)
(United States)	St. Louis Stars	Busch Memorial Stadium	50,000	Bob Hermann/Bill Bidwill (St. Louis Cardinals football)
(Canada)	Toronto Falcons	Varsity Stadium	25,000	Joseph Peters

== Map of clubs ==
NPSL clubs

== 1967 season recap ==
The NPSL kicked off on Sunday, April 16 with a full slate of five matches attended by a total of 46,547 fans. The largest crowd of the day was found in Philadelphia, where 14,163 cheered the hometown Spartans to a 2–0 victory over the Toronto Falcons. The most notable game however, was Baltimore's 1–0 home victory over Atlanta in front of a crowd of just 8,434. It was televised by CBS which had signed a two-year contract to broadcast a game every Sunday afternoon live and in color. Play-by-play voice Jack Whitaker was joined by the former Northern Ireland international Danny Blanchflower as a pundit. Blanchflower was not impressed with the standard of play and did not hesitate to say so.

The NPSL was also criticised after Pittsburgh's 2–1 triumph over Toronto in the Falcons' home opener on Sunday, May 14. Of the twenty-one fouls that afternoon, eleven were called to allow CBS to insert commercials into its telecast. Referee Peter Rhodes also admitted that he had forced players to fake injuries to serve the same purpose. This raised many questions about whether the television networks and its sponsors were having too much influence over televised sporting events.

The NPSL did however attract some notable players including three former Aston Villa players Phil Woosnam, Vic Crowe and Peter McParland who, together with another veteran of the English League, Ron Newman, all turned out for the Atlanta Chiefs. Two ex-Real Madrid players, Juan Santisteban and Yanko Daucik, also turned out for the Baltimore Bays and Toronto Falcons respectively. Santisteban made the NPSL All-Star team and Daucik finished as the league's top scorer.

The Oakland Clippers laid claim to the regular season title boasting both the best record and the most total points in either division. In the NPSL Finals the Western Division champion Clippers defeated the Bays, winners of the Eastern Division for the NPSL Championship by virtue of a 4–2 aggregate. Dennis Viollet gave Baltimore a 1–0 win on Sunday, September 3, before a home crowd of 16,619. Six days later, in the second leg at Oakland, Dragan Đukić scored a hat trick as the Clippers won 4–1 in front of 9,037.

On the same day as the second leg of the NPSL final, the St. Louis Stars defeated Philadelphia, 2–1, in a battle of division runner-ups held in St. Louis before a crowd of 9,565. The victory gave the Stars a berth in the Commissioner's Cup versus Oakland. On September 18, the Clippers completed the NPSL treble, by defeating the Stars for the Commissioner's Cup in front of 8,415 fans at Busch Memorial Stadium by the score of 6–3.

== 1967 regular season ==
P = Played, W = Wins, L = Losses, T = Ties GF = Goals For, GA = Goals Against, Pts = point system

6 points for a win, 3 points for a tie, 0 points for a loss, 1 point for each goal scored up to three per game.

Premiers (most points) Other playoff team

Eastern Division	P	W	L	T	GF	GA	Pts
Baltimore Bays	32	14	9	9	53	47	162
Philadelphia Spartans	32	14	9	9	53	43	157
New York Generals	32	11	13	8	60	58	143
Atlanta Chiefs	31	10	12	9	51	46	135
Pittsburgh Phantoms	31	10	14	7	59	74	132

Western Division	P	W	L	T	GF	GA	Pts
Oakland Clippers	32	19	8	5	64	34	185
St. Louis Stars	32	14	11	7	54	57	156
Chicago Spurs	32	10	11	11	50	55	142
Toronto Falcons	32	10	17	5	59	70	127
Los Angeles Toros	32	7	15	10	42	61	114

== NPSL League leaders ==
GP = Games Played, G = Goals (worth 2 points), A = Assists (worth 1 point), Pts = Points

Player	Team	GP	G	A	Pts
(Czechoslovakia) Yanko Daucik	Toronto	17	20	8	48
(United States) Willy Roy	Chicago	27	17	5	39
(Germany) Rudolf Kölbl	St. Louis	23	15	8	38
(Brazil) Eli Durante	Los Angeles	23	15	5	35
(England) Manfred Rummel	Pittsburgh	19	14	4	32
(United States) Ilija Mitic	Oakland	19	13	3	29
(Argentina) Oscar López	Toronto	25	12	5	29
(Socialist Federal Republic of Yugoslavia) Bora Kostić	St. Louis	28	12	5	29
(Scotland) Ernie Winchester	Chicago	13	13	2	28
(Poland) Norbert Pogrzeba	St. Louis	31	11	6	28
(Argentina) Orlando Garro	Philadelphia	20	12	2	26
(Brazil) Mario Baesso	Oakland	17	11	4	26
(Netherlands) Co Prins	Pittsburgh	21	8	9	25
(Socialist Federal Republic of Yugoslavia) Selemir Milošević	Oakland	12	12	0	24
(United States) Manfred Seissler	Pittsburgh	16	10	4	24

== NPSL All-Stars ==
First team player	Pos.	Team
(Socialist Federal Republic of Yugoslavia) Mirko Stojanovic	G	Oakland
(England) Mel Scott	D	Oakland
(Brazil) Badu DaCruz	D	Baltimore
(Argentina) Rubén Navarro	D	Philadelphia
(Spain) Juan Santisteban	M	Baltimore
(United States) Ilija Mitic	M	Oakland
(United States) Willy Roy	F	Chicago
(Netherlands) Co Prins	F	Pittsburgh
(Brazil) Mario Baesso	F	Oakland
(Jamaica) Art Welch	F	Baltimore
(Zambia) Emment Kapengwe	F	Atlanta

== NPSL Final 1967 ==
Western Division Champion	Aggregate	Eastern Division Champion	First leg	Second leg	Attendance
Oakland Clippers	4–2	Baltimore Bays	0–1	4–1	September 3 • Memorial Stadium • 16,619; September 9 • Oakland-Alameda Coliseum • 9,037

September 3, 1967 First leg	Baltimore Bays	1–0	Oakland Clippers	Memorial Stadium, Baltimore, Maryland
2:15 PM EDT	Dennis Viollet (71:41)	Report 1 Report 2		Attendance: 16,619; Referee: Walter Crossley (England)

September 9, 1967 Second leg	Oakland Clippers	4–1	Baltimore Bays	Oakland-Alameda Coliseum, Oakland, California
12:45 PDT	Dragan Djukic 27' (Davidovic); Dragan Djukic 35' (Davidovic); Dragan Djukic 38' (pen.); Edgar Marín ((Mitic) 58)	Report 1 Report 2	Juan Santisteban (red card) 38'; Guy Saint-Vil 41' (Asher Welch)	Attendance: 9,037; Referee: Mike Ashkenazi

1967 NPSL Champions: Oakland Clippers

== NPSL Commissioner's Cup 1967 ==
The Commissioner's Cup was a one-off challenge match between the NPSL Champion and the winner of a third-place match between the two division runners-up. On September 9 the St. Louis Stars defeated the Philadelphia Spartans 2–1 to secure their place in the match. Earlier that same day the Oakland Clippers were crowned NPSL champions with a, 4–2, two-match aggregate victory over the Baltimore Bays to claim the other cup spot.

September 18, 1967 Cup match	St. Louis Stars	3–6	Oakland Clippers	Busch Memorial Stadium, St. Louis, Missouri
7:30 PM CDT	Norb Pogrezba 36'; Bora Kostić, (pen.)	Report	Joe Fuhrman 10' (o.g.); Edgar Marín 25', 51'; George Lievano 28'; Ilija Mitić 40'; Sele Milosević 80'	Attendance: 8,415; Referee: Emmett Brennan

== Post season awards ==
- Most Valuable Player: (Argentina) Rubén Navarro, Philadelphia
- Rookie of the year: (United States) Willy Roy, Chicago

== NASL formation ==
In December 1967, the NPSL merged with the United Soccer Association to form the North American Soccer League. As a result of the merger several of the original NPSL franchises folded or relocated. This was partly to avoid some cities having two teams. Philadelphia Spartans and Pittsburgh Phantoms both folded, while Chicago Spurs became Kansas City Spurs and Los Angeles Toros became San Diego Toros. Together with New York Generals, Baltimore Bays, Atlanta Chiefs, Toronto Falcons, St. Louis Stars and Oakland Clippers, these teams then became founding members of the NASL. However, only Atlanta Chiefs, who won the inaugural NASL title, and St. Louis Stars enjoyed any longevity. The remaining franchises all folded by 1970.

== Notable players ==
- (United States) Walter Chyzowych
- (United States) Bob Gansler
- (United States) Pat McBride
- (United States) Ilija Mitic
- (United States) Willy Roy
- (England) Terry Adlington
- (England) Ron Newman
- (England) Dennis Viollet
- (England) John Best
- (Argentina) César Luis Menotti
- (Argentina) Rubén Navarro
- (Mexico) Salvador Reyes
- (Costa Rica) Edgar Marin
- (Czechoslovakia) Yanko Daucik
- (Republic of Ireland) Eric Barber
- (Republic of Ireland) Joe Haverty
- (Scotland) Bill Brown
- (Spain) Juan Santisteban
- (Netherlands) Co Prins
- (Northern Ireland) Peter McParland
- (Wales) Vic Crowe
- (Wales) Phil Woosnam

== Bibliography ==
- Official 1968 North American Soccer League Guide. St. Louis: The Sporting News, 1968.
- Durso, Joseph. "Local Pro Soccer Teams May Share Stadium With Yanks in Spring", The New York Times, Sunday, February 12, 1967.
