= Larry Hausmann =

American soccer player

Personal information
- Full name: Lawrence Anthony Hausmann
- Date of birth: August 11, 1941 (age 85)
- Place of birth: St. Louis, Missouri, United States
- Positions: Midfielder; forward

Senior career*
Years	Team	Apps	(Gls)
- St. Louis Kutis
1967–1968	Chicago Mustangs		
1969–1976	St. Louis Stars	100	(8)
1971	St. Louis Stars (indoor)	2	(0)

International career
1968–1974	United States	8	(0)
- * Club domestic league appearances and goals

Larry Hausmann is an American former soccer player who spent nine seasons in the North American Soccer League. He also earned eight caps with the U.S. national team between 1968 and 1972.

== Professional ==
In 1959, Hausmann graduated from Bishop DuBourg High School. He is a member of the Bishop DuBourg Athletic Hall of Fame. He played several seasons with St. Louis Kutis SC. In 1967, he joined the Chicago Mustangs of the United Soccer Association. In 1968, the Mustangs moved to the North American Soccer League but folded at the end of the season. Hausmann moved to the St. Louis Stars in 1969. He played no games that season, but became a regular in 1970. In 1971, as a member of the Stars, he took part in the league's first ever indoor tournament, scoring no goals and earning two penalty minutes. He remained with the team through the 1975 season.

== National team ==
Hausmann earned eight caps with the U.S. national team. His first came on September 15, 1968, in a 3–3 tie with Israel. His last game with the national team came in a 2–2 tie with Canada on August 29, 1972.

He was inducted into the St. Louis Soccer Hall of Fame on September 24, 1993.
