= Wilf Tranter =

English footballer

Personal information
- Full name: Wilfred Tranter
- Date of birth: 5 March 1945 (age 81)
- Place of birth: Pendlebury, Lancashire, England
- Date of death: 2 July 2021 (aged 76)
- Position: Half-back

Youth career
- St Gregory's (Pendlebury)
- Manchester Schoolboys
- Lancashire Schoolboys
- 1961–1962: Manchester United

Senior career*
Years	Team	Apps	(Gls)
1962–1966	Manchester United	1	(0)
1966–1969	Brighton & Hove Albion	47	(1)
1968	Baltimore Bays (loan)	12	(2)
1969–1972	Fulham	23	(0)
1972	St. Louis Stars (loan)	14	(0)
1972–?	Dover Town	?	(?)
- * Club domestic league appearances and goals

Wilfred Tranter (born 5 March 1945) is an English former footballer who played as a half-back. Born in Pendlebury, Lancashire, he played for Manchester United, Brighton & Hove Albion, Fulham, Baltimore Bays and St. Louis Stars. He made his Football League debut for Manchester United two days after his 19th birthday on 7 March 1964, when regular centre-half Bill Foulkes missed the trip to West Ham United due to injury; Tranter was praised for his defensive handling of West Ham forward Johnny Byrne as Manchester United won 2–0. It proved to be his only appearance for the club and he left for Brighton in May 1966. He spent two and a half years on the south coast, including a four-month loan spell with the Baltimore Bays in the North American Soccer League (NASL) between April and August 1968, before joining Fulham in January 1969. At the end of his three-and-a-half-year stay in London, he went back on loan to the United States during the 1972 NASL season to play for the St. Louis Stars.
