= Pittsburgh Phantoms (NPSL) =

Professional soccer team based in Pittsburgh, Pennsylvania in 1967

- Founded: 1967
- Dissolved: 1967
- Stadium: Forbes Field, Pittsburgh, Pennsylvania
- Capacity: 35,714
- President: Peter Block
- Head coach: Herbert Voght; János Bédl; Co Prins; Joseph Gruber
- League: National Professional Soccer League (NPSL)
Home colors	Away colors

The Pittsburgh Phantoms were a professional soccer team based in Pittsburgh, Pennsylvania in 1967. The club was one of the ten charter members of the non-FIFA sanctioned National Professional Soccer League (NPSL). All of the team's home games were played at Forbes Field, which also served as the home of the Pittsburgh Pirates. The team folded at the conclusion of the 1967 NPSL season.

== History ==
In 1966 several groups of entrepreneurs were exploring the idea of forming a professional soccer league in United States. Two of these groups merged to form the National Professional Soccer League (NPSL) and franchise rights were awarded to ten ownership groups, with one given to a group of Penguins investors with Peter Block acting as owner and president.

In November 1966, Herbert "Bavarian Fats" Vogt, was introduced as the team's head coach and general manager, having signed a two-year contract. At his first press conference he gave the first public announcement that the team would be named the "Pittsburgh Phantoms". However two months later, Vogt resigned from his position with the team with the team citing ill health. Vogt later stated that he did he was in excellent health and in a letter to the team claim that in addition to being squeezed out of the job, personnel director Raymond Schwab was not signing "first class players". In March 1967 it was announced that Schwab was leaving his position and was replaced by Ted DeGroot.

János Bédl became the Phantom's second coach, but was fired on May 1, 1967, after just four games and the team in first place in the Eastern Division. Bédl sued the team and eventually settled out of court for $32,500. Co Prins then became player-coach for about a dozen games before being replaced by Josef "Pepi" Gruber in June. During this period, the Phantoms settled out of court with Sparta Rotterdam, a Dutch professional soccer club based in Rotterdam, for $50,000 when the team signed Theo Laseroms to a contract, while he was still under contract with Sparta. The team finished the season in 5th place in the Eastern Division with a record of 10 win, 14 loses and 7 draws and with an average attendance of 3,122. Recording losses of $700,000-750,000, the team folded.

== Media Coverage ==
WIIC-TV covered the Phantoms locally, with the station's sports director Charles "Red" Donley providing commentary. The national games on CBS appeared locally on WIIC as well, as the Pittsburgh Pirates had television coverage on local affiliate KDKA-TV.

== Year-by-year ==
Year	Division	W	L	T	Pts	League	Playoffs
1967	NPSL	10	14	7	132	5th, Eastern Division	did not qualify
