= Kazimierz Frankiewicz =

Polish footballer

Personal information
- Full name: Andrzej Kazimierz Frąckiewicz
- Date of birth: 8 January 1939 (age 87)
- Place of birth: Pułtusk, Poland
- Position: Striker

Senior career*
Years	Team	Apps	(Gls)
1959–1961	Zawisza Bydgoszcz		
1961–1964	Lechia Gdańsk		
1964–1967	Legia Warsaw	37	(2)
1967–1973	St. Louis Stars	120	(42)
1970–1971	→ NAC Breda (loan)		
1974	Boston Minutemen	2	(0)
Total		159+	(44+)

Managerial career
- 1971–1973: St. Louis Stars (player-manager)
- * Club domestic league appearances and goals

Andrzej Kazimierz Frąckiewicz (born 8 January 1939) is a Polish former professional football player and coach who played as a striker. He played in the NASL between 1967 and 1974 for the St. Louis Stars and Boston Minutemen.

== Career ==
In addition to playing for the Stars, he coached the team from 1971 to 1973. In 1972 he won NASL Coach of the Year honors and lead St. Louis to the Southern Division title and into the championship final. Frankiewicz also scored the Stars' lone goal in their 2–1 loss to New York in the Finals. He was a first team NASL All-Star in 1968, a second team All-Star in 1971 and an Honorable Mention in 1972.

During his season with the Boston Minutemen, Frankiewicz was also the team's assistant general manager. After an injury forced him to retire, he was named general manager of the team.

== Honours ==
=== Manager ===
- NASL Coach of the Year: 1972
