= Mike Winter (soccer) =

American soccer player

Personal information
- Date of birth: September 2, 1952 (age 74)
- Place of birth: Austria
- Position: Goalkeeper

Senior career*
| Years | Team | Apps | (Gls) |
| 1972–1974 | St. Louis Stars | 32 | (0) |
| 1974 | St. Louis Stars (indoor) | 1 | (0) |
| 1975 | Chicago Sting | 1 | (0) |

International career
| 1972–1973 | United States | 6 | (0) |
- * Club domestic league appearances and goals

Mike Winter is a retired soccer player who played as a goalkeeper. He spent four seasons in the North American Soccer League and earned six caps for the United States national team.

== NASL ==
Winter was born in Austria. In 1972, the St. Louis Stars of the North American Soccer League (NASL) selected Winter as their goalkeeper. That year, he had the second lowest goals against average (GAA) in the league, behind Kenny Cooper. That achievement led to his selection as the 1972 NASL Rookie of the Year. Winter was the goalie of record on February 13, 1974, when the visiting Red Army team dismantled the Stars, 11–4, in an indoor match before 12,241 fans at the St. Louis Arena. It was the last of three Red Army indoor matches on the tour. Winter spent the 1973 and 1974 seasons with the Stars before the Chicago Sting selected him in the 1975 NASL Expansion Draft. He played one season with the Sting, then left the NASL.

== National team ==
In 1972, Winter earned his first cap with the U.S. national team. He never became a regular starter for the national team as he had significant competition in the nets from Mike Ivanow and Bob Rigby. However, he did earn six caps, but had no shutouts, and more significantly, no wins.
