= St. Louis Stars (soccer) =

Defunct American soccer club

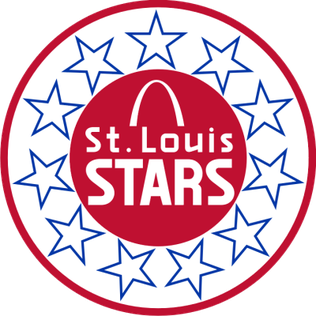
- Full name: St. Louis Stars
- Founded: 1966
- Dissolved: 1977; 49 years ago (moved)
- Stadium: Busch Memorial Stadium; Francis Field at Washington University in St. Louis; St. Louis Arena (indoor)
- Capacity: 55,000 & 6,000; 18,006 (indoor)
- Chairman: Bob Hermann
- Head coach: defunct
- League: NPSL (1967); NASL (1968–1977)
- 1976/77: NASL, Atlantic Conference, Northern Division 2nd
Home colors	Away colors

The St. Louis Stars were a soccer team based in St. Louis, Missouri that played in the original North American Soccer League from 1968 to 1977. The Stars were known for playing mostly American players, many from the St. Louis area, in contrast to other NASL teams' reliance on foreign players. The team moved to Anaheim in 1978 and became the California Surf.

== History ==
=== 1960s ===
The St. Louis Stars, founded in 1967 as a team in the National Professional Soccer League, were the first professional soccer team in St. Louis since the shuttering of the St. Louis Soccer League, although St. Louis had a long history of strong play in amateur leagues and college soccer. The Stars were headed by St. Louis businessman Bob Hermann. Hermann later went on to become president of the NPSL, and to create the Hermann Trophy, college soccer's version of the Heisman Trophy. The Stars immediately stole the spotlight from the local amateur clubs and attracted many mainstream sports fans. The first Stars team included players from nine countries, with nine players from Yugoslavia, and the majority of the team did not speak English. The Stars' average attendance 7,613 was the highest in the league. After the season, the NPSL merged with the rival United Soccer Association to form the North American Soccer League. The Stars became a member of the newly merged league.

Following the 1968 NASL season, the league was in trouble with ten franchises having folded. The team's owners cut back on players' salaries, and the team became semi-pro. The 1969 season was split into two halves. The first half was called the International Cup, a double round-robin tournament in which the remaining NASL clubs were represented by teams imported from the United Kingdom. The Stars were represented by Kilmarnock F.C. of Scotland. The Stars came in last for the Cup with a 2–5–1 record. For the second half of the 1969 season, the teams returned to their normal rosters, and played a 16-game schedule with no playoffs.

=== 1970s ===
After the first two money-losing seasons, the team's owners cut back. The Stars became a semi-pro team, with players paid by the game and holding other jobs. Consequently, the team began to draw poor crowds, averaging fewer than 4,000 fans per game for the three seasons from 1969 to 1971.

On March 19, 1971, the Stars hosted the 1971 NASL Professional Hoc-Soc Tournament, which was the first indoor soccer tournament sanctioned by a Division One professional league in U.S. history. The Stars lost their opening match, 2–1, but rebounded, 2–0, to win the third place match up.

The Stars best season was 1972. The Stars won the Southern Division that year, defeated the Rochester Lancers 2–1 in a semifinal match held at Busch Memorial Stadium in St. Louis, and in Final they lost 2–1 to the Cosmos in a match played at Hofstra Stadium in New York. Pat McBride (MF) and John Sewell (DF) were named first team all-stars for the 1972 season. The team's success reinvigorated fan appeal, leading the league in attendance in 1972 with close to 8,000 fans per match, and continuing to draw over 6,000 fans each season from 1972 to 1977.

The Stars were noted for developing American players, in particular from the St. Louis area, instead of recruiting aging foreign players with high contracts. From 1969 to 1976, the Stars' squads were mostly American players. The Stars could afford to rely on local talent because at the time St. Louis had strong college teams and amateur competitions, with St. Louis University winning 10 NCAA national championships from 1959 to 1973. This strategy is one of the reasons for the Stars' longevity (lasting ten seasons during some the NASL's most turbulent times), but often the team was mediocre. On February 13, 1974, the Stars played host (and lost, 11–4) to the Red Army team at the St. Louis Arena in the final match of Russian squad's three city, North American indoor soccer tour. St. Louis went on to participate in both the 1975 and 1976 NASL indoor tournaments with little success.

In 1975 the Stars signed a foreign star: Peter Bonetti. "The Cat" was a FA Cup-winning star for Chelsea, had played for England from 1966–1970, was the backup goalkeeper to Gordon Banks on England's winning team in the 1966 World Cup, and had started one match at the 1970 World Cup. Bonetti had a solid season with the Stars, and was named a NASL first-team all-star for the 1975 season. The Stars won the Central Division in 1975, defeated the L.A. Aztecs in the quarterfinals at Busch Memorial Stadium, and lost to the Portland Timbers in the semifinals. John Sewell was named NASL Coach of the Year.

In 1977, the Stars once again recruited an English goalkeeper, Bill Glazier, who was supposed to be England's backup goalkeeper at the 1966 World Cup, but had suffered a broken leg. While Glazier had long been successful as Coventry City's #1, he struggled for form in St. Louis as John Jackson won the starting goalkeeper role for the 1977 season. In 1977 the Stars finished second in the Northern Division, qualifying for the playoffs, where they lost in the first round to Rochester at Busch Memorial Stadium. Key players for the 1977 Stars team were DF Ray Evans (NASL second-team all-star) and MF Al Trost (NASL honorable mention).

From 1967–68 and 1971–74 the Stars played at Busch Memorial Stadium and from 1969 to 1970 and 1975–77 the home games were held at Francis Field.

=== Move to California ===
By 1977, the Stars' emphasis on American players had begun to erode. Although the 1977 squad was still mostly American, it included eight Englishmen. There was an attempt to return to Busch for 1978, but the Stars could not secure a lease to their liking. The only venue option was Francis Field, a relatively small facility at Washington University in St. Louis that had hosted events of the 1904 Olympic Games—and player salaries were rising sharply, so there seemed little alternative but to move. After the 1977 season, the Stars moved to Anaheim and became the California Surf. Although the California Surf retained their core group of American (mostly St. Louis) players, under English coach John Sewell the California Surf imported more English players.

First division soccer would not return to the city until 2023, when St. Louis City SC joined Major League Soccer.

== Media coverage ==
The Stars had good radio coverage the first season on KWK with Jay Randolph doing commentary. Some matches over the first two seasons were on KMOX. From 1973, KCFV, the station for St. Louis Community College would broadcast many home matches. Television would be more elusive, with CBS providing national coverage on KMOX-TV for two seasons. KPLR started televising matches in 1973, and after a break in 1975, returned for the last two seasons.

== Year-by-year ==
Year	Record	Regular season finish	Playoffs	Avg Attend.	Cup
1967	14–11–7	2nd, Western Division (NPSL)	Did not qualify	7,613	Runners-up
1968	12–14–6	3rd, Gulf Division	Did not qualify	5,388	n/a
1969	3–11–2	4th, NASL	Did not qualify	2,274	n/a
1970	5–17–2	3rd, Eastern Division, Northern Division	Did not qualify	2,745	n/a
1971 indoor	1–1	3rd in Hoc-soc tournament	won 3rd place match	5,060	n/a
1971	6–13–5	4th, Southern Division	Did not qualify	3,579	n/a
1972	7–4–3	1st, Southern Division	Runners-up	7,773	n/a
1973	7–7–5	2nd, Southern Division	Did not qualify	6,337	n/a
1974	4–15–1	4th, Central Division	Did not qualify	7,374	n/a
1975 indoor	1–1	2nd, Region 1	Did not qualify	5,060	n/a
1975	13–9	1st, Central Division	Semi-Finals	6,071	n/a
1976 indoor	0–2	4th, Midwest Regional	Did not qualify	1,700	n/a
1976	5–19	5th, Pacific Conference, Western Division	Did not qualify	6,150	n/a
1977	12–14	2nd, Atlantic Conference, Northern Division	First round	9,794	n/a

== Honors ==
NPSL Commissioner's Cup

- 1967 runner-up

NASL championships

- 1972 runner-up

Division titles

- 1972 Southern Division
- 1975 Central Division

Rookie of the Year

- 1970 Jim Leeker
- 1972 Mike Winter

Coach of the Year

- 1972 Casey Frankiewicz
- 1975 John Sewell

U.S. Soccer Hall of Fame

- 1989 Bob Kehoe
- 1989 Willy Roy
- 1994 Pat McBride
- 2001 Bob Hermann
- 2006 Al Trost

Indoor Soccer Hall of Fame

- 2012 Dragan Popović

All-Star first team selections

- 1968 Casey Frankiewicz
- 1969 Joe Puls
- 1971 Dragan Popović
- 1972 Pat McBride, John Sewell
- 1975 Peter Bonetti

All-Star second team selections

- 1970 Pat McBride
- 1971 Casey Frankiewicz
- 1972 Wilf Tranter
- 1973 Pat McBride
- 1976 Al Trost
- 1977 Ray Evans

All-Star honorable mentions

- 1972 Casey Frankiewicz, Joe Puls
- 1973 John Sewell, Al Trost
- 1977 Al Trost

Indoor All-Stars

- 1971 Dragan Popović, Miguel de Lima

== Leading scorers ==
- 1967 – (Germany) Rudi Kölbl (15 G)
- 1968 – (Poland) Kazimierz Frankiewicz (16 G)
- 1969 – (United States) Tommy Ferguson (7 G)
- 1970 – (United States) Pat McBride (7 G)
- 1971 – (Poland) Kazimierz Frankiewicz (14 G)
- 1972 – (United States) Willy Roy (7 G)
- 1973 – (United States) Willy Roy (7 G)
- 1974 – (United States) Dennis Vaninger (6 G)
- 1975 – (England) John Hawley (11 G)
- 1976 – (United States) Al Trost (12 G)
- 1977 – (England) Fred Binney (9 G)

== Coaches ==
- (Socialist Federal Republic of Yugoslavia) George Mihaljevic (1967)
- (Germany) Rudi Gutendorf (1968)
- (United States) Bob Kehoe (1969–70)
- (United States) George Meyer and (Poland) Casey Frankiewicz (1971)
- (Poland) Casey Frankiewicz (1972–73)
- (England) John Sewell (1974–78)

== See also ==
- Soccer in St. Louis
- California Surf (1978–81)
- St. Louis Steamers (1979–88)
- St. Louis Storm (1989–92)
- St. Louis Ambush (1992–2000)
- AC St. Louis (2010)
- Saint Louis FC (2015–present)
