= Pat McBride =

American soccer player-coach (1943–2024)

Personal information
- Full name: Patrick McBride
- Date of birth: November 13, 1943
- Place of birth: St. Louis, Missouri, U.S.
- Date of death: December 11, 2024 (aged 81)
- Position: Midfielder

College career
Years	Team	Apps	(Gls)
1963–1967	Saint Louis Billikens		

Senior career*
Years	Team	Apps	(Gls)
1967–1976	St Louis Stars	193	(31)
1971–1976	St Louis Stars (indoor)	5	(4)

International career
1969–1975	United States	5	(0)

Managerial career
- 1979–1981: St. Louis Steamers
- 1981–1984: Kansas City Comets
- 1985–1987: St. Louis Steamers
- * Club domestic league appearances and goals

Patrick McBride (November 13, 1943 – December 11, 2024) was an American soccer midfielder and indoor soccer coach. He earned five caps with the U.S. national team and is a member of the National Soccer Hall of Fame.

== College and professional career ==
As a youth growing up in the fertile soccer hotbed of St. Louis, McBride played for his parish school team in the competitive Catholic youth leagues before moving on to high school at St. Louis University High. McBride attended St. Louis University from 1963 to 1967 where he played for the school's NCAA soccer team, known as the Billikens. He was selected a first-team All-American in 1964 and 1965.

After graduating in 1967, he was the first American-born player drafted by the Saint Louis Stars of the National Professional Soccer League (NPSL). After the 1967 season, the Stars moved to the newly established North American Soccer League (NASL). McBride remained with this team until 1976 and was one of the first outstanding native U.S. soccer players of the modern era. He was a 1970 and 1973 Second Team and a 1972 First Team All-Star.

== International career ==
McBride first donned the U.S. uniform as a member of the U.S. Olympic Team during their attempt to qualify for the 1964 Summer Olympics. The U.S. lost to Suriname and Mexico to go with one win over Panama. The 1–2 record was not good enough to qualify for the Olympics and McBride would not play for the U.S. again until his debut for the senior team in 1969. He went on to play five times for the United States men's national soccer team. He earned his first cap as a substitute for Adolph Bachmeier in a 2–0 loss to Haiti on April 20, 1969, and gained his first national team start in an August 20, 1972 loss to Canada. He saw time in two other games in 1972 but did not play again until his last cap which came in the crushing 7–0 loss to Poland on March 26, 1972.

== Coaching career ==
After retiring as a player, McBride became the assistant coach to Head Coach Bob Guelker at Southern Illinois University at Edwardsville where he helped the team achieve an undefeated season and the first NCAA College Division National Championship in 1972. The SIUE team was ranked the number one team in the United States by the NSCAA when the 1973 season began. He went on to become the head coach of the Major Indoor Soccer League (MISL) expansion team St. Louis Steamers in 1979. He coached the team for most of two seasons, earning MISL coach of the year for the 1979–1980 season and being fired in the 1980–1981 postseason over a contract dispute. McBride returned as coach in 1985 and remained through the 1985–1986 season. Between his two stints with St Louis, McBride also coached the Kansas City Comets (MISL). The team hired him on December 27, 1981, and fired him on December 24, 1984.

He was inducted into the U.S. National Soccer Hall of Fame in 1994.

== Death ==
McBride died on December 11, 2024, at the age of 81.
