= Co Prins =

Dutch footballer and manager

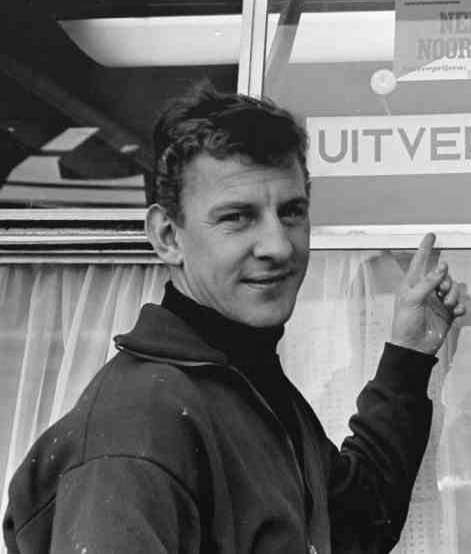
- Prins in 1965

Personal information
- Full name: Jacobus Theodorus Wilhelmus Prins
- Date of birth: 5 June 1938
- Place of birth: Amsterdam, Netherlands
- Date of death: 26 September 1987 (aged 49)
- Place of death: Antwerp, Belgium
- Position: Striker

Senior career*
Years	Team	Apps	(Gls)
1959–1963	AFC Ajax	114	(33)
1963–1965	1. FC Kaiserslautern	36	(9)
1965–1967	AFC Ajax	39	(9)
1967	Pittsburgh Phantoms	21	(8)
1968	New York Generals	27	(5)
1969–1971	MVV Maastricht	85	(5)
1971–1972	Vitesse Arnhem	17	(2)
1972–1974	Helmond Sport	23	(1)

International career
1960–1965	Netherlands	10	(3)

Managerial career
- 1967: Pittsburgh Phantoms
- * Club domestic league appearances and goals

Jacobus Theodorus Wilhelmus "Co" Prins (5 June 1938 – 26 September 1987) was a Dutch association football player. He played 184 matches for football club Ajax Amsterdam from 1959 to 1966 where he scored 60 goals. He played for the German football team 1. FC Kaiserslautern in the mid-sixties, being then one of the few foreign football professionals in Germany.

Prins earned his first international cap on 30 November 1960, in the Netherlands' 4–0 friendly match defeat to Czechoslovakia in Prague and won his tenth and last cap in a 0–0 World Cup qualifying draw with Switzerland on 17 November 1965 in Amsterdam.

As an actor, Prins played Dutch football player and Allied POW Pieter Van Beck in the film Escape to Victory in 1981.

He died of a heart attack while playing in a match in 1987.

Prins was married with Karin (whom he met whilst playing for Kaiserslautern in Germany) and he had two kids with her (Andy and Ronny), who both played professional football in Belgium.

== Career statistics ==
=== International career ===
Appearances and goals by national team and year
National team	Year	Apps	Goals
Netherlands	1960	1	0
Netherlands	1961	0	0
Netherlands	1962	7	3
Netherlands	1963	0	0
Netherlands	1964	0	0
Netherlands	1965	2	0
Total		10	3

Scores and results list the Netherlands' goal tally first, score column indicates score after each Prins goal.

List of international goals scored by Co Prins
No.	Date	Venue	Opponent	Score	Result	Competition
1	5 September 1962	Olympisch Stadion, Amsterdam, Netherlands	Netherlands Antilles	3–0	8–0	Friendly
2	5 September 1962	Olympisch Stadion, Amsterdam, Netherlands	Netherlands Antilles	8–0	8–0	Friendly
3	26 September 1962	Københavns Idrætspark, Copenhagen, Denmark	Denmark	1–2	1–4	Friendly
