= John Sewell (footballer) =

English footballer (1936–2021)

Personal information
- Full name: John David Sewell
- Date of birth: 7 July 1936
- Place of birth: Brockley, England
- Date of death: 19 November 2021 (aged 85)
- Place of death: Sequim, Washington, U.S.
- Position: Defender

Youth career
- Bexleyheath and Welling

Senior career*
Years	Team	Apps	(Gls)
1955–1963	Charlton Athletic	185	(5)
1963–1971	Crystal Palace	231	(6)
1971–1972	Leyton Orient	7	(0)
1972–1975	St. Louis Stars	58	(4)

Managerial career
- 1974–1977: St. Louis Stars
- 1978–1980: California Surf
- * Club domestic league appearances and goals

John David Sewell (7 July 1936 – 19 November 2021) was an English professional footballer who had a long career in the Football League, before continuing as player and coach in the North American Soccer League (NASL) during the 1970s. Nicknamed "The Duke" for his good dress sense, Sewell also had the distinction of never having been booked during his English playing career and only once throughout his entire playing career.

His career at a close, Sewell stayed in California for almost thirty years, before retiring to Washington state in 2006. He died in Sequim, Washington on 19 November 2021.
