= North American Soccer League =

Soccer league in the United States (1968–1984)

- The final logo of the league.
- Founded: December 7, 1967; 58 years ago
- Folded: March 28, 1985; 41 years ago
- Country: United States
- Other club from: Canada
- Confederation: CONCACAF
- Number of clubs: 24
- Level on pyramid: 1
- Promotion to: None
- Relegation to: None
- Last champions: Chicago Sting (1984)
- Most championships: New York Cosmos (5 titles)

The North American Soccer League (NASL) was the top-level major professional soccer league in the United States and Canada that operated from 1968 to 1984. It is considered the first soccer league to be successful on a national scale in the United States. The league final was called the Soccer Bowl from 1975 to 1983 and the Soccer Bowl Series in its final year, 1984. The league was headed by Commissioner Phil Woosnam from 1969 to 1983. The NASL laid the foundations for soccer in the United States that helped lead to the country hosting the 1994 FIFA World Cup and setting up Major League Soccer (MLS) in 1996.

The United States did not have a truly national top-flight league until the FIFA-sanctioned United Soccer Association (USA) and the National Professional Soccer League (NPSL), which had operated separately for one season in 1967 and merged in December 1967 to form the NASL. The NASL considered the two pre-merge forerunner leagues as part of its history.

The league's popularity peaked in the late 1970s. The league averaged over 13,000 fans per game in each season from 1977 to 1983, and the league's matches were broadcast on network television from 1975 to 1980.

The league's most prominent team was the New York Cosmos. During the mid-to-late 1970s, the Cosmos signed a number of the world's best players—Pelé, Franz Beckenbauer, Carlos Alberto—and averaged over 28,000 fans per game for each season from 1977 to 1982 while having three seasons of the average attendance topping 40,000 spectators per game. Other internationally well-known players in the league included Giorgio Chinaglia, Johan Cruyff, Johan Neeskens, Gerd Müller, Bobby Moore, Eusébio, and George Best. However, over-expansion, the economic recession of the early 1980s, and disputes with the players union ultimately led to the collapse of the NASL following the 1984 season. Also, FIFA's decision to award the hosting of the 1986 FIFA World Cup to Mexico after Colombia withdrew, rather than the U.S., is considered a factor in the NASL's demise. Former New York Cosmos president Clive Toye called the league "a magnificent success that eventually failed as a single entity. But, what it left behind is a knowledge of the game that didn't even existed [sic] in this country before and enthusiasm for the game which never existed before."

The league additionally sanctioned indoor soccer in various tournament and season formats between 1971 and 1984.

== History ==
=== Founding ===
The first logo, used between 1968 and 1974.

The surprisingly large North American TV audience of over 1 million for the 1966 FIFA World Cup and the resulting documentary film, Goal!, led American sports investors to believe there was an untapped market for the sport in the U.S. and Canada. In 1967, two professional soccer leagues started in the United States: the FIFA-sanctioned United Soccer Association (USA), which consisted of entire European and South American teams brought to the U.S. and given local names, and the unsanctioned National Professional Soccer League (NPSL). The NPSL did not receive sanctioning by the USSFA, as it refused to pay the $25,000 fee, was branded an outlawed entity by FIFA, and players faced penalties for signing with it. While the USA had FIFA sanction, the foreign teams that were rebranded with American names for the summer 1967 season viewed the league as little more than a training exercise for their off-season, and most did not field their best players. The NPSL had a two-year national television contract in the U.S. with the CBS television network. Officials were instructed to whistle fouls and delay play to allow CBS to insert commercials. The ratings for matches were unacceptable even by weekend daytime standards and the arrangement with CBS was soon terminated. Bill MacPhail, head of CBS Sports, attributed NPSL's lack of TV appeal to empty stadiums with few fans, and to undistinguished foreign players who were unfamiliar to American soccer fans.

The two leagues merged on December 7, 1967, to form the North American Soccer League (NASL). NASL began the 1968 season with 17 of the 22 teams that had participated during the 1967 season, folding five redundant teams in cities where both USA and NPSL had operated. The teams relied mostly on foreign talent, including the Brazilian Vavá, one of the leading scorers of the 1958 and 1962 World Cups. International friendlies included victories against Pelé's Santos and against English champions Manchester City.

Though the league had a few successes, it experienced significant problems gaining acceptance in the American sports community. The 17 teams included only 30 North American players. The expenses of high salaries for foreign players and renting of large stadiums, coupled with low attendances, resulted in every team losing money in 1968, and investors quickly pulled the plug after their year's commitment ended. At the end of the year, CBS pulled its TV contract, and all but five of the teams folded. The league moved its offices to a basement of Atlanta–Fulton County Stadium, and at the end of the sixteen-game 1969 season, the league declared Kansas City the league champions on the basis of most points in the round-robin, and the Baltimore Bays announced they would fold. It appeared top-tier professional soccer would not survive in North America.

Desperate to keep the league afloat, the league approached two American Soccer League teams, the Rochester Lancers and the Washington Darts about transferring to the NASL. Despite coming from the ASL (which had a nearly 40-year history as a semi-pro league), the two teams were immediately the most successful, and won their respective divisions. Rochester beat Washington in a two-game final, and the league survived.

In 1971, NASL added three teams—the New York Cosmos, Montreal Olympique, and the Toronto Metros—each of which paid a $25,000 expansion fee. The Dallas Tornado won the title after a number of multiple overtime playoff games, including a 173-minute marathon against Rochester.

Realizing it needed to sell to North Americans the sport of soccer, which was still foreign to most people, the NASL modified its game rules in an attempt to make its product more exciting, and comprehensible, to the average sports fan. These changes included the following:

- Utilizing a clock that counted game time down to zero, as was typical of other timed American sports, rather than the traditional upwards direction to 90 minutes.
- The introduction during the 1972 season of a line 35 yd (32 m) from the goal to determine offside calls, rather than the usual midfield line. Meant to increase scoring opportunities and reduce the frequency of defenses trapping an attacking player into an offside position, this rule allowed the attacker to no longer be offside unless he had crossed that 35-yard line. Though it was ridiculed outside the NASL, the experiment did have FIFA's blessing until 1982.
- The implementation in 1974 of a penalty shootout to decide matches that ended in a draw. By the 1977 season the shootout was modified to somewhat resemble, in spirit at least, a penalty shot in ice hockey. The attacking player would start at the 35-yard line and attempt his shot within five seconds, but he could make as many breakaway moves as he could; likewise, the goalkeeper could take on the attacker without restriction. The format was best-of-5-kicks, with each team attempting extra rounds if the score was still tied after five rounds.
- The carryover of the NPSL's 1967 points system, in which teams were awarded six points for a regulation (and later extra time) win, and initially three points for a draw. When the penalty shootout eliminated tie games in 1974, the winning team was awarded three points for a win rather than six; this was later reduced to one point in 1975–1976, raised to the traditional six points from 1977 to 1980, and reduced again to four points from 1981 to 1984.
  - The most notable variation on the points system that was also carried over from the NPSL was awarding a team a bonus point for each goal (up to a three-goal maximum) they scored in the game, regardless of its outcome. On five occasions this nontraditional system gave the regular season title to a team other than the one with the best record; this most notably occurred in 1983, when the Cosmos, buoyed by their league-leading 87 goals, were awarded the regular season title despite having two fewer wins than the Vancouver Whitecaps.

=== Interest begins to grow ===
The NASL of the early 1970s was, to a large extent, a semi-pro league, with many of the players holding other jobs.

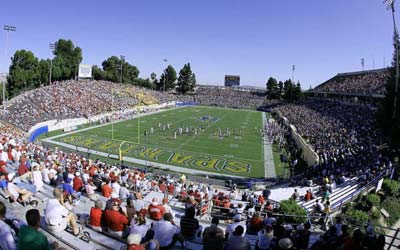
In 1975, Spartan Stadium in San Jose, California, hosted the first Soccer Bowl when its capacity was 18,155

On September 3, 1973, Sports Illustrated featured a soccer player on its cover for the first time – Philadelphia Atoms goalkeeper Bob Rigby. SI profiled the Philadelphia Atoms' victory in the NASL championship, the first time an American expansion sports team won a title in its first season. Philadelphia averaged 11,500 fans in 1973, the first time since 1967 that any North American professional soccer team had averaged over 10,000 fans. The cover title declared "Soccer Goes American", as Philadelphia had started six Americans in the championship match. Despite the "Soccer Goes American" title, however, in no season after 1974 did any American player win the MVP award or finish as league top scorer, as the mid-1970s saw an influx of foreign talent. SI predicted continued success for the Philadelphia Atoms, but the Atoms dissolved in 1976.

NASL's average attendance had grown steadily from a low of 2,930 in 1969 to 7,770 in 1974, and by 1974 four teams were averaging over 10,000 attendance. The 1974 NASL Championship game between the Los Angeles Aztecs and the Miami Toros was televised live on CBS, the first national broadcast of a pro soccer match in the United States since 1968.

The logo introduced in 1975 and used until the league folded in 1985.

The 1974 and 1975 seasons saw rapid expansion for NASL. In 1974, eight new teams paid the $75,000 franchise fee (equivalent to $370,000 in 2024) and joined the league, although two existing teams folded. The 1974 expansion saw teams on the west coast, giving NASL a national presence for the first time. The west coast expansion was a success, with three of the teams – San Jose, Seattle and Vancouver – averaging over 10,000 fans in 1974. In 1975, five more franchises were added. Two of these five additions – Chicago and Hartford – were in cities that had successful franchises in Division II American Soccer League, which at the time saw itself as a potential challenger to NASL as the U.S.'s top professional soccer league. The expansions of 1974 and 1975 meant that NASL had grown from 9 teams in 1973 to 20 teams by 1975.

The 1975 season saw the signing of internationally known players, including Portuguese star Eusébio to Boston, and former England goalkeeper Peter Bonetti to St. Louis.

=== Pelé and the New York Cosmos ===
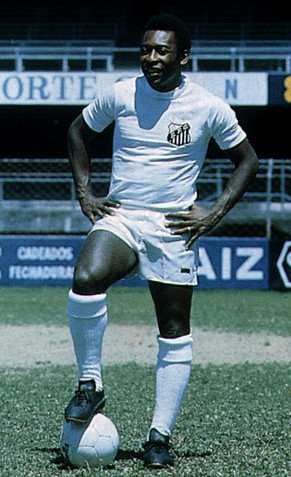
Pelé played for the New York Cosmos from 1975 to 1977

In 1975, the New York Cosmos created a media buzz and put international eyes on soccer in the United States by signing Pelé. From the moment he signed his contract at the 21 Club on June 10, 1975, in front of worldwide media, Pelé's every move was followed, bringing attention to soccer in America. The Cosmos' home attendance tripled in just half the season Pelé was there, and on the road the Cosmos also played in front of crowds that came to watch Pelé play.

Pelé's arrival resulted in greater TV exposure for the Cosmos and for the league overall. Ten million people tuned in to watch CBS' live broadcast of Pelé's debut match—a record American TV audience for soccer—with the Cosmos on June 15, 1975, against the Dallas Tornado at Downing Stadium in New York. CBS also televised another Cosmos match plus the 1975 Soccer Bowl championship match, and in 1976 ABC signed a contract to broadcast matches during the 1976 season. By 1976, NASL was being picked up by the mainstream media, with the sports pages of newspapers covering the league. The NASL was shown on the TVS network (a syndicated television service) during 1977 and 1978, although some games were tape delayed or not carried in certain markets.

The biggest club in the league and the organization's bellwether was the Cosmos, who drew upwards of 40,000 fans per game at their height, during the period that older soccer superstars, like Pelé of Brazil and Franz Beckenbauer of Germany, played for the club. Although both well past their prime by this stage of their careers, the two were considered to have previously been the best attacking/offensive (Pelé) and defensive (Beckenbauer) players in the world.

Giants Stadium sold out (73,000+) their 1978 Soccer Bowl win. However, the overall average attendance of the entire league never reached 15,000, with some clubs averaging less than 5,000.

=== Expansion and star players ===
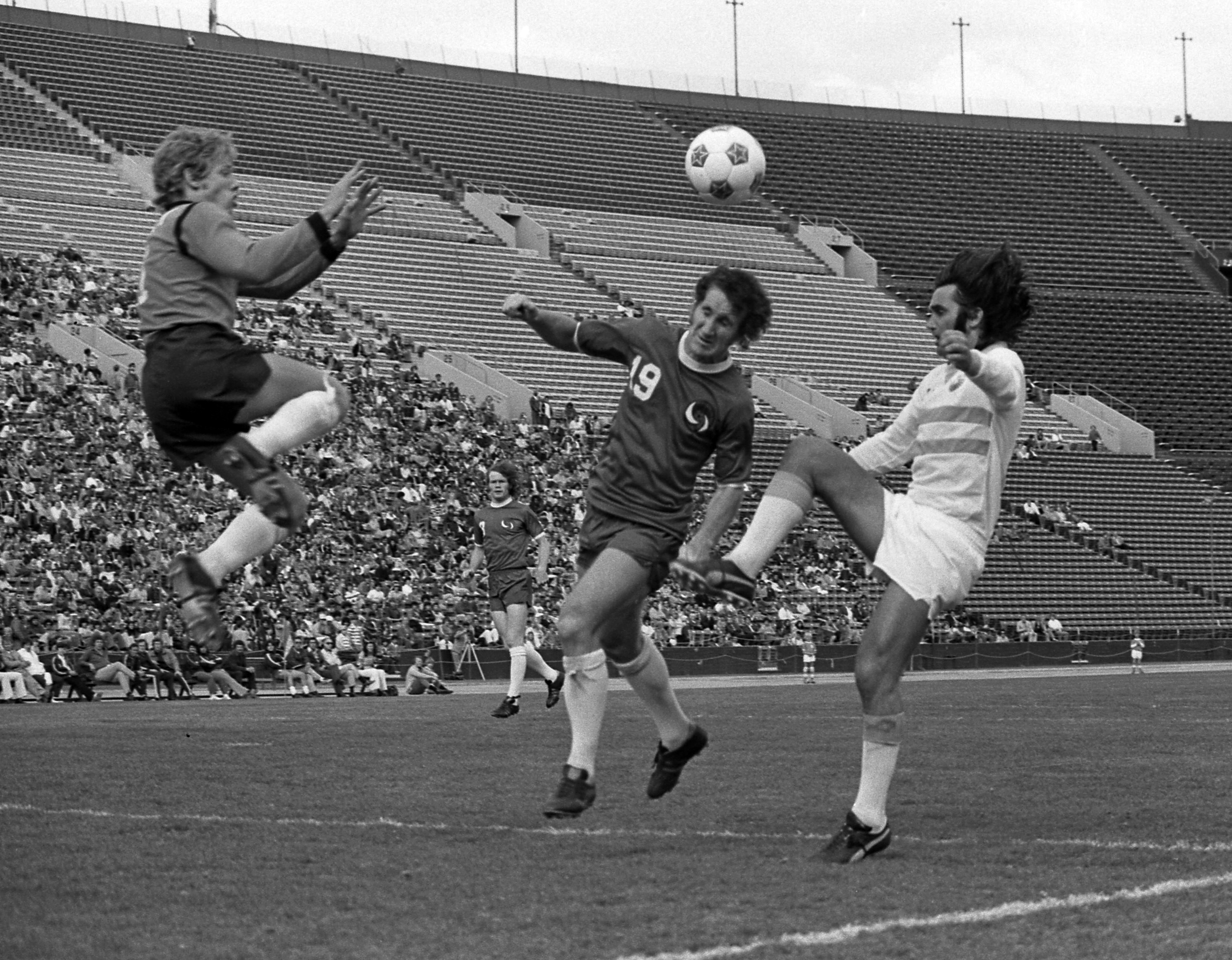
George Best (right) of the Los Angeles Aztecs challenges for the ball against New York Cosmos, 1976

The Los Angeles Aztecs signed Manchester United star George Best in 1976. NASL had been trying to persuade Best to move to America and place him in a major media market, but once the New York Cosmos had signed Pelé, Los Angeles was the logical placement for Best. Best was traded to the Fort Lauderdale Strikers (a club based in the Miami area) in 1978, and in 1979 Los Angeles signed its next big star, Johan Cruyff. Cruyff was an instant success, doubling the team's attendance, and winning the league's MVP award. L.A. also brought in a new head coach from 1979 to 1980, Rinus Michels, who had coached Ajax Amsterdam, Barcelona, and the Dutch national team, the man credited with the invention of the Dutch playing style of "Total Football" in the 1970s.

The Minnesota Kicks were established in 1976 and quickly became one of the league's more popular teams, drawing an average attendance of 23,120 fans per game in 1976 to the Metropolitan Stadium in a Minneapolis-Saint Paul suburb. The Kicks won their division four years in a row from 1976 to 1979, drawing over 23,000 fans in each of those four seasons (peaking at 32,775 in 1977).

After L.A., Cruyff then moved on to the Washington Diplomats. The Washington Diplomats had been purchased by Madison Square Garden Corp. and its chairman Sonny Werblin in October 1978. Cruyff's presence was a huge boost, as was Wim Jansen, a midfielder who had played for the Netherlands at the 1974 and 1978 World Cups. For the 1980 season, the Diplomats attendance was 19,205 spectators per match.

Despite NASL's apparent success, of NASL's 18 teams in 1977, six were considered franchises that needed to be relocated, bought out, or folded. A planning committee of owners issued a report recommending that NASL strengthen its existing teams, and limit expansion to two franchises for 1978, with one additional franchise per year for the following years. Despite this recommendation, NASL brought in six new teams at $3 million per team, raising the league's teams from 18 to 24 for the 1978 season.

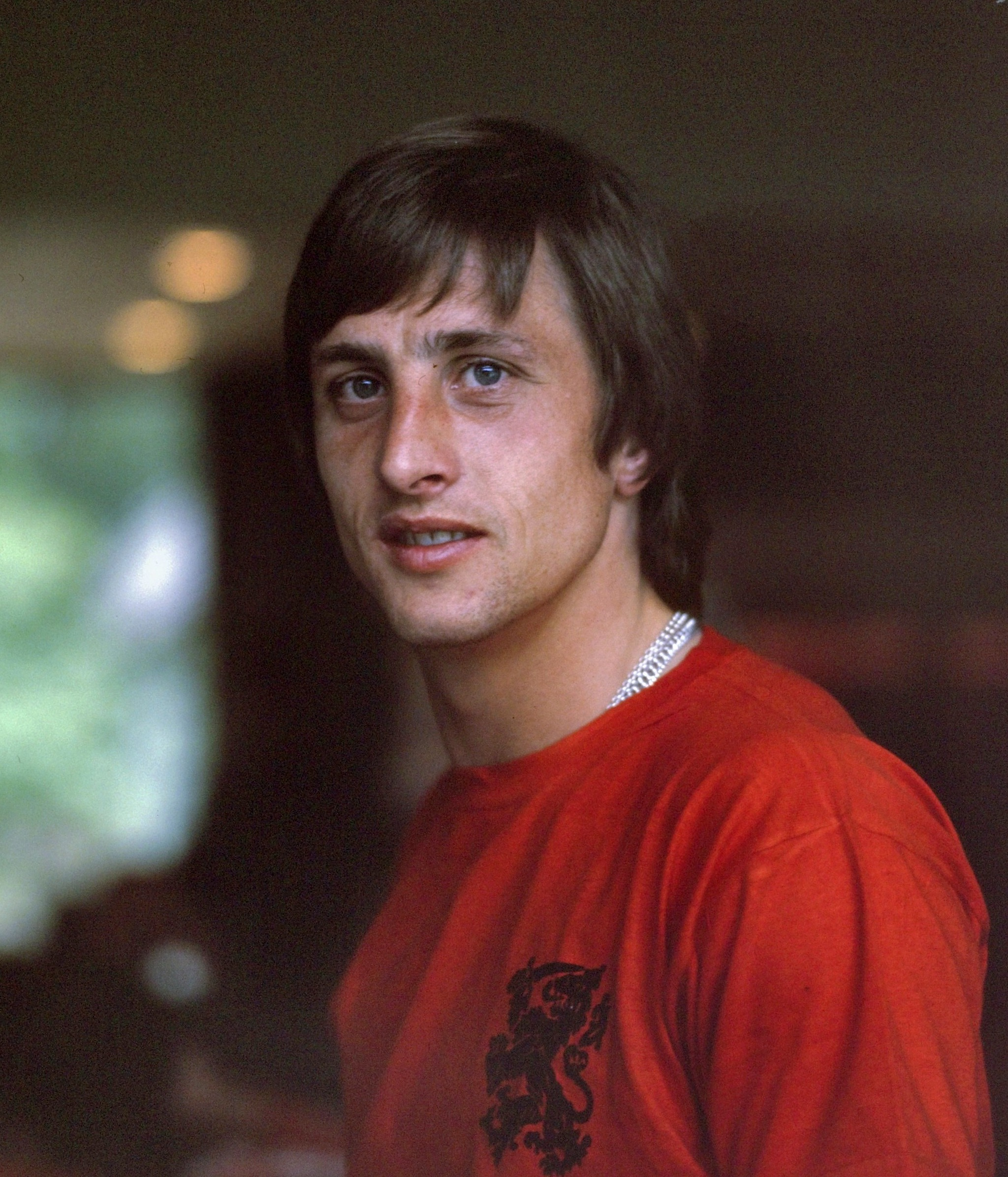
The Los Angeles Aztecs signed Dutch superstar Johan Cruyff in 1979

San Diego Sockers President Jack Daley later described NASL's boom years of the late 1970s: "It became fashionable to chase the Cosmos. Everyone had to have a Pelé. Coaches went around the world on talent searches, forcing the prices up." The Portland Timbers tripled their team payroll from 1979 to 1980 in an effort to keep up with the league average.

The league began a college draft in 1972 in an attempt to increase the number of U.S.- and Canadian-born players in the league. The foreign image of soccer was not helped, however, by a league that brought in many older, high-profile foreign players, and frequently left Americans on the bench. This effort was often doubly futile, as while many of the foreign players were perhaps "big names" in their home countries, almost none of them qualified as such in North America, and they quickly absorbed most of the available payroll, such as it was, which could have otherwise been used to pay North American players better. After the 1977 season, the team owners voted to mandate an increase in the number of North American players by limiting the number of non-North American players a team was permitted to have on the field at one time and reducing the total of non-citizens on a club's rosters to a total of 11 by 1984. As of 1979, NASL rules required that each squad start two U.S. or Canadian players—often a goalkeeper and an outside defender—and that each 17-man roster carry six native players. The U.S. had lacked sufficient quality youth soccer programs in the 1950s, resulting in the dearth of U.S.-born talent in NASL in the 1970s. NASL suffered a minor blow with a players strike at the start of the 1979 season, but the strike was honored by only one third of the players and lasted only five days.

In 1980, the minimum number of U.S. and Canadian starters was raised to three. The 1980 season was referred to as "the year of the North American player" with a renewed emphasis on "native players." With the increased requirements for teams to field U.S. and Canadian players, demand for quality native players boomed, with Jim McAlister setting a transfer record for an American player at $200,000 (or $640,000 in 2024).

With the end of the 1970s, NASL seemed poised for moderate success. The 1979 season had seen attendance increase by 8%. ABC televised several matches during the 1979 and 1980 seasons. An apparent era of stability seemed to have arrived, with the 1980 season expecting no planned expansion, relocations or failed teams among its 24 franchises, and with most rosters remaining relatively stable.

=== FIFA disputes ===
The NASL was often in dispute with FIFA due to its rules changes. In April 1978, FIFA threatened the United States Soccer Federation with banning NASL players from playing international games, due to the unsanctioned soccer rule changes by the NASL.

=== Financial problems and contraction ===
North American Soccer League Progression
Season	Teams	Games	Attendance	Network TV (games)
1968	17	32	4,699	CBS
1969	5	16	2,930	None
1970	6	24	3,163	None
1971	8	24	4,154	None
1972	8	14	4,780	None
1973	9	19	5,954	None
1974	15	20	7,770	CBS (1)
1975	20	22	7,642	CBS (2)
1976	20	22	10,295	CBS (2)
1977	18	26	13,558	TVS (7)
1978	24	30	13,084	TVS (6)
1979	24	30	14,201	ABC (9)
1980	24	32	14,440	ABC (8)
1981	21	32	14,084	ABC (1)
1982	14	32	13,155	None
1983	12	30	13,258	None
1984	9	24	10,759	None
TV column includes only network TV. It does not include cable (ESPN, USA) or pay-per-view (SportsVision).

At the close of the 1980 season, NASL's woes were beginning to mount, as NASL was feeling the effects of over-expansion, the economic recession, and disputes with the players union. In the early 1980s the U.S. economy went into the doldrums, with unemployment reaching 10.8% in 1982, its highest level since World War II. NASL's owners, who were losing money, were not immune from the broader economy.

Perhaps most troubling of all, NASL owners were spending sums on player salaries that could not be covered by league revenue. Whereas NFL owners in 1980 were spending on average 40% of the team's budget on player salaries, NASL owners were averaging over 70% of their budget on player salaries. The Cosmos, in particular, owned by Warner Communications, were spending lavish sums on player salaries, and while other teams—such as Los Angeles, Jacksonville, Portland, Toronto, and Montreal—that were owned by major corporations could keep up with the Cosmos, owners without deep pockets could not keep pace with the spending levels. Owners spent millions on aging stars to try to match the success of the Cosmos and lost significant amounts of money in doing so.

Another headache for NASL was competition from the resurgent Major Indoor Soccer League. The MISL began during the 1978–79 season, grew quickly, and by the early 1980s MISL was averaging over 8,000 fans per game. MISL's growth meant that throughout the early 1980s the NASL and the MISL engaged in a bidding war for U.S.-based soccer players, putting further pressure on league salaries and heightening NASL's financial problems. In an effort to vie for MISL's expanding audiences, the NASL operated an indoor soccer league from 1979–80 to 1981–82 and in 1983–84.

As a result, the league ran a collective deficit in 1980 of about $30 million (or $95.6 million in 2024), with each team losing money. The San Diego Sockers lost $10 million from 1978 to 1983, and Tulsa lost $8 million from 1980 to 1983. The Washington Diplomats folded in November 1980, after owners MSG Corp. lost a rumored $5 million on the team in 1979 and 1980.

NASL had also decided to sell TV advertising locally, instead of recruiting national sponsors. During the 1980 offseason, the NASL Players' Association was in dispute with the league over projected payments for the indoor season, causing the players to file a lawsuit against the league.

The 1981 season was even worse for the league, with the league's 21 teams again running a collective deficit of $30 million (or $87.4 million in 2024) and every team losing money. Ted Turner's Atlanta Chiefs lost $7 million (or $20.4 million in 2024), the Minnesota Kicks lost $2.5 million (or $7.28 million in 2024), the Calgary Boomers lost over $2 million (or $5.82 million in 2024), and Lamar Hunt's Dallas Tornado had lost $1 million annually. At the close of the 1981 season five teams folded, with another two teams—the L.A. Aztecs and Minnesota Kicks—later folding during the 1981–82 offseason after failing to find buyers. NASL shrank from 21 teams to 14.

Many of these new owners were not soccer savvy, and once the perceived popularity started to decline, they got out as quickly as they got in. Over-expansion without sufficient vetting of ownership groups was a huge factor in the death of the league. Once the league started growing, new franchises were awarded quickly, and it doubled in size in a few years, peaking at 24 teams. Many have suggested that cash-starved existing owners longed for their share of the expansion fee charged of new owners, even though Forbes Magazine reported this amount as being only $100,000.

=== Decline and demise ===
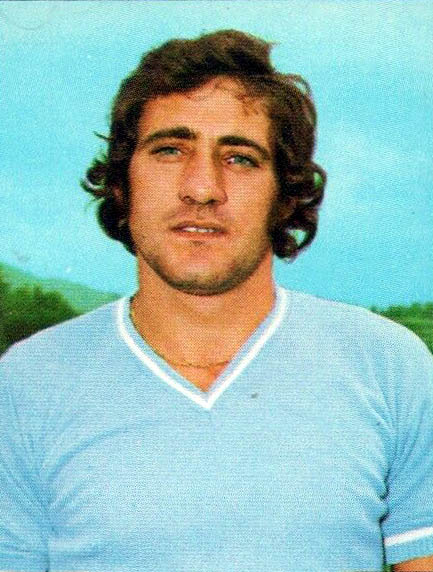
Italian forward Giorgio Chinaglia was the NASL's all-time scorer (193).

With the league declining rapidly in the early 1980s and losing many franchises, the NASL made several changes in an attempt to keep going. Phil Woosnam, who had served as NASL Commissioner since 1969 and had been a strong proponent of expansion during the 1970s, was removed by the league's 14 owners in April 1982 by a reported 11–3 vote. The NASL tried to help bring the 1986 World Cup to the United States after Colombia withdrew from its commitment to host, but FIFA decided in 1983 to award the hosting of the 1986 FIFA World Cup to Mexico, rather than the U.S. In early 1984, NASL reached a collective bargaining agreement with the NASL Players Association that included a $825,000 salary cap to be achieved by annual 10% reductions, and a reduction in roster sizes from 28 to 19.

The league lasted until the 1984 NASL season with only nine teams taking the field. On March 28, 1985, the NASL suspended operations for the 1985 season, when only the Minnesota Strikers and Toronto Blizzard were interested in playing. At the time, the league planned to relaunch in 1986.

Of those final nine teams, the Chicago Sting, Minnesota Strikers, New York Cosmos, and San Diego Sockers joined the Major Indoor Soccer League for its 1984–85 season. The Tulsa Roughnecks independently played 11 matches in 1985, before suspending operations on July 17. The Golden Bay Earthquakes and Tampa Bay Rowdies managed to survive as independent franchises until they joined the WSA and AISA respectively. The Rowdies were the last surviving NASL franchise to play outdoor soccer, lasting until February 1994. The Sockers were the final league franchise to dissolve. They survived playing exclusively indoor soccer until 1996.

=== Heritage ===
After the United States' early elimination in 1982 World Cup qualifying, American manager Walt Chyzowych stated the NASL had failed to offer much of a foundation for his team, since the league had largely failed to develop American players. Canada fared better, coming a win short of qualification for the 1982 World Cup with a squad exclusively made up of NASL players. Although the NASL ultimately failed, it did introduce soccer to the North American sports scene on a large scale for the first time, and was a major contributing factor in soccer becoming one of the most popular sports among American youth. On July 4, 1988, FIFA awarded the hosting of the 1994 World Cup to the United States. NASL has also provided lessons for its successor Major League Soccer, which has taken precautions against such problems, particularly a philosophy of financial restraint (mainstream American sports, by the time of MLS' startup in 1996, had adopted financial restraint rules, which MLS adopted). American college and high school soccer still use some NASL-style rules (with shortened halves, although the time does stop for certain reasons). The hockey-style penalty shootout is used in the Kings League, a seven-a-side indoor variation of soccer founded by ex-FC Barcelona player Gerard Piqué.

18 of the 22 players on the Canadian squad at the 1986 World Cup were former NASL players. The United States did not have any former NASL players on their squad at the 1990 World Cup but had three on the 1994 team (Fernando Clavijo, Hugo Pérez and Roy Wegerle) and one on the 1998 team (Wegerle).

Several NASL team names have been reused by teams in later soccer leagues. Currently the Portland Timbers, San Jose Earthquakes, Seattle Sounders FC, and Vancouver Whitecaps FC are all successor teams in Major League Soccer. Four other well known names (New York Cosmos, Tampa Bay Rowdies, Fort Lauderdale Strikers, and Tulsa Roughnecks) have resurfaced in the new NASL (which eventually folded) and the USL (now the USL Championship and USL League One), Division II and III leagues. Two of the oldest derbies in North American professional soccer (Cascadia Cup and Fort Lauderdale–Tampa Bay) began in the NASL of the 1970s, and continue today via successor clubs.

NASL indoor progression
Year	Participation	Games played
1971	4 of 8 teams	4 games
1975	16 of 20 teams	2–4 games
1976	12 of 20 teams	2–4 games
1977	—	—
1978 Skelly	4 of 24 teams	4 games
1978 Schlitz	4 of 24 teams	4 games
1979	4 of 24 teams	4 games
1979–80	10 of 24 teams	12 games
1980–81	19 of 21 teams	18 games
1981–82	13 of 14 teams	18 games
1983	4 of 12 teams	8 games
1983–84	7 of 9 teams	32 games

=== NASL indoor ===
The NASL first staged an indoor tournament in 1971 at the St. Louis Arena with a $2,800 purse. After a couple of years of experimenting, including a three-city tour by the Red Army team from Moscow in 1974, the league again staged tournaments in 1975 and 1976. For many years Tampa Bay owner George W. Strawbridge, Jr. lobbied his fellow owners to start up a winter indoor season, but was repeatedly stone-walled by other owners. For several years, his Rowdies and several other teams used winter indoor "friendlies" as part of their training and build-up to the outdoor season. In the meantime, pressed by the rival Major Indoor Soccer League (MISL), which inaugurated play in 1978, two-day mini-tournaments like the Skelly Invitational and the NASL Budweiser Invitational were held with varying degrees of success. The NASL finally started a full indoor league schedule, a 12-game season with 10 teams, in 1979–80. For the 1980–81 season, the number of teams playing indoor soccer increased to 19 and the schedule grew to 18 games. The schedule remained at 18 games, but the teams participating decreased to 13 for the 1981–82 season. The league canceled the 1982–83 indoor season and three teams (Chicago, Golden Bay, and San Diego) played in the MISL for that season. Four other teams (Fort Lauderdale, Montreal, Tampa Bay and Tulsa) competed in a short NASL Grand Prix of Indoor Soccer Tournament in early 1983. The NASL indoor season returned for 1983–84 with only seven teams but a 32-game schedule.

== NASL champions ==
=== By year ===
Year	Winner (number of titles)	Runners-up	Top regular season team (points)	Top scorer (points)	Winning coach
1968	Atlanta Chiefs	San Diego Toros	San Diego Toros (186 points)*	(Poland) Janusz Kowalik	(Wales) Phil Woosnam
1969	Kansas City Spurs	Atlanta Chiefs	Kansas City Spurs (110 points)*	(South Africa) Kaizer Motaung	(Hungary) János Bédl
1970	Rochester Lancers	Washington Darts	Washington Darts (137 points)	(Greece) Kirk Apostolidis	(Italy) Sal DeRosa
1971	Dallas Tornado	Atlanta Chiefs	Rochester Lancers (141 points)	(United States) Carlos Metidieri	(England) Ron Newman
1972	New York Cosmos	St. Louis Stars	New York Cosmos (77 points)	(Bermuda) Randy Horton	(United States) Gordon Bradley
1973	Philadelphia Atoms	Dallas Tornado	Dallas Tornado (111 points)	(United States) Kyle Rote Jr.	(United States) Al Miller
1974	Los Angeles Aztecs	Miami Toros	Los Angeles Aztecs (110 points)	(United States) Paul Child	(Albania) Alex Perolli
1975	Tampa Bay Rowdies	Portland Timbers	Portland Timbers (138 points)	(Trinidad and Tobago) Steve David	(Italy) Eddie Firmani
1976	Toronto Metros-Croatia	Minnesota Kicks	Tampa Bay Rowdies (154 points)	(Italy) Giorgio Chinaglia	(Socialist Federal Republic of Yugoslavia) Domagoj Kapetanović
1977	New York Cosmos (2)#	Seattle Sounders	Fort Lauderdale Strikers (161 points)	(Trinidad and Tobago) Steve David	(Italy) Eddie Firmani
1978	New York Cosmos (3)#	Tampa Bay Rowdies	New York Cosmos (212 points)	(Italy) Giorgio Chinaglia	(Italy) Eddie Firmani
1979	Vancouver Whitecaps	Tampa Bay Rowdies	New York Cosmos (216 points)	(Chile) Óscar Fabbiani	(England) Tony Waiters
1980	New York Cosmos (4)	Fort Lauderdale Strikers	New York Cosmos (213 points)*	(Italy) Giorgio Chinaglia	(West Germany) Hennes Weisweiler (Turkey) Yasin Özdenak
1981	Chicago Sting	New York Cosmos	New York Cosmos (200 points)	(Italy) Giorgio Chinaglia	(United States) Willy Roy
1982	New York Cosmos (5)	Seattle Sounders	New York Cosmos (203 points)	(Italy) Giorgio Chinaglia	(Brazil) Julio Mazzei
1983	Tulsa Roughnecks	Toronto Blizzard	New York Cosmos (194 points)*	(Paraguay) Roberto Cabañas	(Wales) Terry Hennessey
1984	Chicago Sting (2)	Toronto Blizzard	Chicago Sting (120 points)*	(Socialist Federal Republic of Yugoslavia) Steve Zungul	(United States) Willy Roy

* Due to the NASL's nontraditional points system, in 1968, 1969, 1980, 1983 & 1984 the team with the best win–loss record did not win the regular season.
# The New York Cosmos dropped "New York" from its name for the 1977 and 1978 seasons, then returned to the full name.

=== By club ===
Club	Winner	Runner-up	Seasons Won	Seasons Runner-up
New York Cosmos	5	1	1972, 1977, 1978, 1980, 1982	1981
Chicago Sting	2	0	1981, 1984	–
Atlanta Chiefs	1	2	1968	1969, 1971
Tampa Bay Rowdies	1	2	1975	1978, 1979
Toronto Metros/Blizzard	1	2	1976	1983, 1984
Dallas Tornado	1	1	1971	1973
Kansas City Spurs	1	0	1969	–
Rochester Lancers	1	0	1970	–
Philadelphia Atoms	1	0	1973	–
Los Angeles Aztecs	1	0	1974	–
Vancouver Whitecaps	1	0	1979	–
Tulsa Roughnecks	1	0	1983	–
Seattle Sounders	0	2	–	1977, 1982
San Diego Toros	0	1	–	1968
Washington Darts	0	1	–	1970
St. Louis Stars	0	1	–	1972
Miami Toros	0	1	–	1974
Portland Timbers	0	1	–	1975
Minnesota Kicks	0	1	–	1976
Fort Lauderdale Strikers	0	1	–	1980

# The New York Cosmos dropped "New York" from its name for the 1977 and 1978 seasons, then returned to the full name.

== NASL indoor champions ==
=== By year ===
Year	Winner (number of titles)	Runners-up	Top team in regular season	Top scorer	Winning coach
1971	Dallas Tornado (1)	Rochester Lancers	Dallas Tornado 2–0 *(tournament only)	(United States) Mike Renshaw (United States) Jim Benedek (Canada) Dragan Popović	(England) Ron Newman
1975	San Jose Earthquakes (1)	Tampa Bay Rowdies	San Jose Earthquakes 4–0 *(tournament only)	(United States) Paul Child	(Socialist Federal Republic of Yugoslavia) Ivan Toplak
1976	Tampa Bay Rowdies (1)	Rochester Lancers	Tampa Bay Rowdies 4–0 *(tournament only)	(United States) Juli Veee	(Italy) Eddie Firmani
1978 Skelly	Tulsa Roughnecks (1)	Minnesota Kicks	Tulsa Roughnecks 2–0 *(tournament only)	(Socialist Federal Republic of Yugoslavia) Nino Zec	(England) Bill Foulkes
1978 Schlitz	Dallas Tornado (2)	Houston Hurricane	Houston Hurricane 2–0 *(tournament only)	(England) Peter Anderson (Finland) Kai Haaskivi	(United States) Al Miller
1979	Dallas Tornado (3)	Tampa Bay Rowdies	Dallas Tornado 2–0 *(tournament only)	(Scotland) Jim Ryan	(United States) Al Miller
1979–80	Tampa Bay Rowdies (2)	Memphis Rogues	Atlanta Chiefs 10–2	(South Africa) David Byrne	(England) Gordon Jago
1980–81	Edmonton Drillers (1)	Chicago Sting	Chicago Sting 13–5	(West Germany) Karl-Heinz Granitza	(Finland) Timo Liekoski
1981–82	San Diego Sockers (1)	Tampa Bay Rowdies	Edmonton Drillers 13–5	(United States) Juli Veee	(England) Ron Newman
1983	Tampa Bay Rowdies (3)	Montreal Manic	Montreal Manic 4–2 *(double round-robin stage)	(England) Laurie Abrahams (Canada) Dale Mitchell	(United States) Al Miller
1983–84	San Diego Sockers (2)	New York Cosmos	San Diego Sockers 21–11	(Socialist Federal Republic of Yugoslavia) Steve Zungul	(England) Ron Newman

=== By club ===
Club	Winner	Runner-up	Seasons Won	Seasons Runner-up
Tampa Bay Rowdies	3	3	1976, 1979–80, 1983	1975, 1979, 1981–82
Dallas Tornado	3	0	1971, 1978 Schlitz, 1979	–
San Diego Sockers	2	0	1981–82, 1983–84	–
San Jose Earthquakes	1	0	1975	–
Tulsa Roughnecks	1	0	1978 Skelly	–
Edmonton Drillers	1	0	1980–81	–
Rochester Lancers	0	2	–	1971, 1976
Minnesota Kicks	0	1	–	1978 Skelly
Houston Hurricanes	0	1	–	1978 Schlitz
Memphis Rogues	0	1	–	1979–80
Chicago Sting	0	1	–	1980–81
Montreal Manic	0	1	–	1983
New York Cosmos	0	1	–	1983–84

== Teams ==
=== Outdoor season ===
Legend

– existed before 1968 NASL formation. – continued after 1984 NASL demise. – existed before 1968 and after 1984

Team	NASL Seasons	NASL Evolution of Franchise	Other Leagues
Atlanta Apollos	1973	Chiefs→Apollos	–
Atlanta Chiefs	1968–1972	Chiefs→Apollos	NPSL
Atlanta Chiefs (1979)	1979–1981	Caribous→Chiefs (1979)	–
Baltimore Bays	1968–1969	–	NPSL
Baltimore Comets	1974–1975	Comets→Jaws→Quicksilvers→Sockers	–
Boston Beacons	1968	–	USA
Boston Minutemen	1974–1976	–	–
Calgary Boomers	1981	Rogues→Boomers	–
California Surf	1978–1981	Stars→Surf	–
Caribous of Colorado	1978	Caribous→Chiefs (1979)	–
Chicago Mustangs	1968	–	USA
Chicago Sting	1975–1984	–	MISL
Cleveland Stokers	1968	–	USA
Connecticut Bicentennials	1977	Bicentennials→Connecticut→Stompers→Drillers	–
Cosmos	1977–1978	New York→Cosmos→New York	–
Dallas Tornado	1968–1981	–	USA
Denver Dynamos	1974–1975	Dynamos→Kicks	–
Detroit Cougars	1968	–	USA
Detroit Express	1978–1981	Express→Diplomats (1981)	–
Edmonton Drillers	1979–1982	Bicentennials→Connecticut→Stompers→Drillers	–
Fort Lauderdale Strikers	1977–1983	Darts→Gatos→Toros→Strikers→Minnesota	–
Golden Bay Earthquakes	1983–1984	San Jose Earthquakes→Golden Bay	MISL, WSA
Hartford Bicentennials	1975–1976	Bicentennials→Connecticut→Stompers→Drillers	–
Houston Hurricane	1978–1980	–	–
Houston Stars	1968	–	USA
Jacksonville Tea Men	1980–1982	Tea Men→Jacksonville	ASL, USL
Kansas City Spurs	1968–1970	–	NPSL
Las Vegas Quicksilvers	1977	Comets→Jaws→Quicksilvers→Sockers	–
Los Angeles Aztecs	1974–1981	–	–
Los Angeles Wolves	1968	–	USA
Memphis Rogues	1978–1980	Rogues→Boomers	–
Miami Gatos	1972	Darts→Gatos→Toros→Strikers→Minnesota	–
Miami Toros	1973–1976	Darts→Gatos→Toros→Strikers→Minnesota	–
Minnesota Kicks	1976–1981	Dynamos→Kicks	–
Minnesota Strikers	1984	Darts→Gatos→Toros→Strikers→Minnesota	MISL
Montreal Manic	1981–1983	Fury→Manic	–
Montreal Olympique	1971–1973	–	–
New England Tea Men	1978–1980	Tea Men→Jacksonville	–
New York Cosmos	1971–76, 1979–84	New York→Cosmos→New York	MISL
New York Generals	1968	–	NPSL
Oakland Clippers	1968	–	NPSL
Oakland Stompers	1978	Bicentennials→Connecticut→Stompers→Drillers	–
Philadelphia Atoms	1973–1976	–	–
Philadelphia Fury	1978–1980	Fury→Manic	–
Portland Timbers	1975–1982	–	–
Rochester Lancers	1970–1980	–	ASL
St. Louis Stars	1968–1977	Stars→Surf	NPSL
San Antonio Thunder	1975–1976	Thunder→Team Hawaii→Roughnecks	–
San Diego Jaws	1976	Comets→Jaws→Quicksilvers→Sockers	–
San Diego Sockers	1978–1984	Comets→Jaws→Quicksilvers→Sockers	MISL, CISL
San Diego Toros	1968	–	NPSL
San Jose Earthquakes	1974–1982	Earthquakes→Golden Bay	–
Seattle Sounders	1974–1983	–	–
Tampa Bay Rowdies	1975–1984	–	AISA, ASL, APSL
Team America	1983	–	–
Team Hawaii	1977	Thunder→Team Hawaii→Roughnecks	–
Toronto Blizzard	1979–1984	Metros→Metros-Croatia→Blizzard	–
Toronto Falcons	1968	–	NPSL
Toronto Metros	1971–1974	Metros→Metros-Croatia→Blizzard	–
Toronto Metros-Croatia*	1975–1978	Metros→Metros-Croatia→Blizzard	NSL, CISL, CSL
Tulsa Roughnecks	1978–1984	Thunder→Team Hawaii→Roughnecks	–
Vancouver Royals	1968	–	USA
Vancouver Whitecaps	1974–1984	–	–
Washington Darts	1970–1971	Darts→Gatos→Toros→Strikers→Minnesota	ASL
Washington Diplomats	1974–1980	–	–
Washington Diplomats (1981)	1981	Express→Diplomats (1981)	–
Washington Whips	1968	–	USA

*Operated as Toronto Croatia from 1956 until they merged with the NASL's Toronto Metros in 1975, and then again after they sold out of the NASL in 1979.

Of the 67 teams that played in the NASL over the course of its 17 seasons, many represent relocated franchises, and a handful represent the same franchise in the same location with changed names such as the Apollos, Cosmos and Earthquakes. The total number of unique clubs was 43.

=== Teams that played indoor seasons or tournaments (1971, 1975–76, 1978–84) ===
- Atlanta Chiefs (1979–81)
- Baltimore Comets (1975)
- Boston Minutemen (1975–76)
- Calgary Boomers (1980–81)
- California Surf (1979–81)
- Chicago Sting (1976, 1980–82, 1983–84)
- Dallas Tornado (1971, 1975–76, 1978–79, 1980–81)
- Detroit Express (1979–81)
- Edmonton Drillers (1980–82)
- Fort Lauderdale Strikers (1979–81, 1983)
- Golden Bay Earthquakes (1983–84)
- Hartford Bicentennials (1975)
- Houston Hurricane (1978)
- Jacksonville Tea Men (1980–82)
- Los Angeles Aztecs (1975, 1978, 1979–81)
- Memphis Rogues (1979–80)
- Miami Toros (1975–76)
- Minnesota Kicks (1978–81)
- Montreal Manic (1981–82, 1983)
- New England Tea Men (1979–80)
- New York Cosmos (1975, 1981–82, 1983–84)
- Philadelphia Atoms (1975)
- Portland Timbers (1980–82)
- Rochester Lancers (1971, 1975–76)
- St. Louis Stars (1971, 1975–76)
- San Diego Jaws (1976)
- San Diego Sockers (1978, 1980–82, 1983–84)
- San Jose Earthquakes (1975–76, 1980–82)
- Seattle Sounders (1975, 1980–82)
- Tampa Bay Rowdies (1975–76, 1979–84)
- Toronto Blizzard (1980–82)
- Toronto Metros-Croatia (1975–76)
- Tulsa Roughnecks (1978–84)
- Vancouver Whitecaps (1975–76, 1980–82, 1983–84)
- Washington Darts (1971)
- Washington Diplomats (1975–76, 1978)

== Commissioners ==
- 1967: Dick Walsh (USA) – After 18 years with the Los Angeles Dodgers, he was chosen to serve as commissioner of first the United Soccer Association (USA) in 1966, then the North American Soccer League (NASL), which resulted from the merger of the US and the National Professional Soccer League (NPSL) prior to the 1968 season. He served the NASL through its first full season, 1968, then returned to baseball.
- 1967: Ken Macker (NPSL)
- 1968: Walsh and Macker co-commissioners
- 1969–83: Phil Woosnam – He is credited as an important factor in the development of the NASL, and had been a major figure in promoting the league and had secured TV contracts from CBS and ABC. He played a key role during 1970 in recruiting executives at Warner Communications to invest in an expansion team—the New York Cosmos. Woosnam oversaw the westward expansion of NASL in the early 1970s, establishing teams in Los Angeles, the Bay Area, Seattle, and Vancouver. However, he also guided the league into several poor business decisions, such as over-expansion to 24 teams, that led to team owners' significant financial losses. He was removed from his duties as commissioner of the NASL in 1983 following a vote of the club owners.
- 1983–84: Howard J. Samuels – His pioneering methods in the petrochemical industry and success in the then-niche household consumer market translated into posts as Vice President of the Mobil Oil Corporation, Commissioner of the North American Soccer League, and chairman to Elms Capital Management, Alexander Proudfoot PLC, and Communities in Schools.
- 1984–85: Clive Toye (acting) – After the sudden death of Howard J. Samuels, Toye was appointed interim president of the NASL in December 1984. The league ceased operations early the following year.

== Awards ==
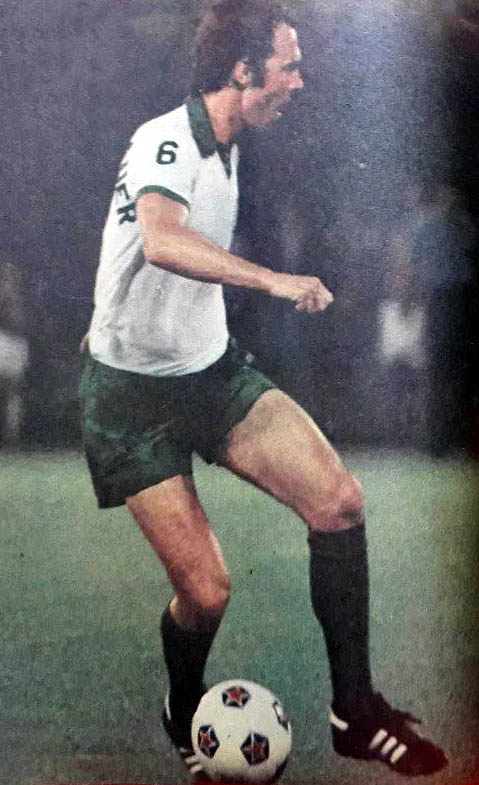
German legend Franz Beckenbauer in 1977 with the New York Cosmos

=== Most Valuable Player, Rookie of the Year, Coach of the Year ===
Year	MVP	Rookie	Coach
1968	(Poland) Janusz Kowalik	(South Africa) Kaizer Motaung	(Wales) Phil Woosnam
1969	(Uruguay) Pepe Fernández	(Uruguay) Pepe Fernández	(Hungary) János Bédl
1970	(United States) Carlos Metidieri	(United States) Jim Leeker	(Italy) Sal DeRosa
1971	(United States) Carlos Metidieri (2)	(Bermuda) Randy Horton	(England) Ron Newman
1972	(Bermuda) Randy Horton	(United States) Mike Winter	(Poland) Kazimierz Frankiewicz
1973	(Trinidad and Tobago) Warren Archibald	(United States) Kyle Rote Jr.	(United States) Al Miller
1974	(England) Peter Silvester	(United States) Doug McMillan	(Scotland) John Young
1975	(Trinidad and Tobago) Steve David	(United States) Chris Bahr	(England) John Sewell
1976	(Brazil) Pelé	(United States) Steve Pecher	(Italy) Eddie Firmani
1977	(West Germany) Franz Beckenbauer	(United States) Jim McAlister	(England) Ron Newman (2)
1978	(England) Mike Flanagan	(United States) Gary Etherington	(England) Tony Waiters
1979	(Netherlands) Johan Cruyff	(United States) Larry Hulcer	(Finland) Timo Liekoski
1980	(England) Roger Davies	(United States) Jeff Durgan	(England) Alan Hinton
1981	(Italy) Giorgio Chinaglia	(United States) Joe Morrone, Jr.	(United States) Willy Roy
1982	(England) Peter Ward	(United States) Pedro DeBrito	(Republic of Ireland) Johnny Giles
1983	(Paraguay) Roberto Cabañas	(United States) Gregg Thompson	(Socialist Federal Republic of Yugoslavia) Dragan Popović
1984	(Socialist Federal Republic of Yugoslavia) Steve Zungul	(South Africa) Roy Wegerle	(England) Ron Newman (3)

== Teams named after NASL teams ==
The Heritage Cup in Major League Soccer was developed as a way to remember the NASL's heritage by having teams named after NASL teams to participate for a special trophy. Today, two MLS teams, San Jose and Seattle, play for this trophy, although Portland and Vancouver are both eligible for the trophy if they decide to participate in this derby. NASL clubs' names still active in some form today are listed in bold.

- (United States) Baltimore Bays (1972–1973)
- (United States) Baltimore Bays (1993–1998)
- (United States) Boston Tea Men
- (United States) Chicago Stingers
- (United States) **Chicago Mustangs (2012–)**
- (United States) DFW Tornados
- (United States) Detroit Express (1981–1983)
- (United States) **East Bay FC Stompers** – NPSL
- (Canada) Edmonton Drillers (1996–2000)
- (Canada) Edmonton Drillers (2007–2010)
- (United States) Florida Strikers – USISL
- (United States) Fort Lauderdale Strikers (1988–1994)
- (United States) Fort Lauderdale Strikers (1994–1997)
- (United States) Fort Lauderdale Strikers (2006–2016)
- (United States) Houston Hurricanes
- (United States) Houston Hurricanes FC
- (United States) Houston Stars (WPSL)
- (South Africa) **Jomo Cosmos** – National First Division
- (South Africa) **Kaizer Chiefs FC** – Premier Soccer League
- (United States) **L.A. Wolves FC**
- (United States) Las Vegas Quicksilver – USISL
- (United States) Maryland Bays
- (United States) Memphis Rogues – AISA & SISL
- (United States) New York Cosmos (2013–2020)
- (United States) **New York Cosmos (2026-)** - USL League One
- (United States) Philadelphia Atoms SC – ASL
- (United States) Philadelphia Fury (2011–2019) – NISL
- (United States) Portland Timbers – WSL
- (United States) Portland Timbers – USL
- (United States) **Portland Timbers** – MLS
- (United States) **Rochester Lady Lancers** – UWS
- (United States) Rochester Lancers (MASL)
- (United States) **Rochester Lancers** – NPSL
- (United States) Santa Cruz Surf – USISL
- (United States) San Diego Sockers (2001–2004)
- (United States) **San Diego Sockers (2009–)**
- (United States) **San Diego Surf** – PASL
- (United States) **San Jose Earthquakes** – Heritage Cup (MLS)
- (United States) San Fernando Valley Quakes
- (United States) Seattle Sounders – USL
- (United States) **Seattle Sounders FC** – Heritage Cup (MLS)
- (United States) SoCal Surf – PDL
- (United States) South Florida Strikers – WPSL
- (United States) **Tampa Bay Rowdies**
- (Canada) Toronto Blizzard (1986–1993)
- (Canada) Toronto Falcons (NSL)
- (United States) Tulsa Roughnecks (1993–2000)
- (United States) Tulsa Roughnecks (1995) – W-League
- (United States) Tulsa Roughnecks FC (2015–2019) – USL (now called FC Tulsa)
- (Canada) Vancouver Whitecaps – USL
- (Canada) **Vancouver Whitecaps FC** – MLS
- (United States) Washington Diplomats (1988–1990)

== Players ==
The NASL brought some of the world's best soccer players to the United States. The trend started early as players such as Vavá, Peter McParland, Rubén Marino Navarro, Co Prins and Juan Santisteban appeared in the league in 1968. However, after the Cosmos signed Pele in 1975, the number of famous names increased during the NASL's peak during the late 1970s and early 1980s. In fact, 20 of the 44 World Cup Best XI selections between 1966 and 1978 spent time in the NASL. At one time NASL squads fielded the captains of the past three World Cup-winning teams—Beckenbauer (1974), Alberto (1970), and Moore (1966). Of the European Footballer of the Year awards from 1965 to 1976, eight of the twelve awards—Eusébio (1965), Best (1968), Muller (1970), Cruyff (1971, '73, '74), Beckenbauer (1972, '76) —were given to players who went on to play in NASL. In addition, several players went on to greater acclaim after leaving the NASL, among them Peter Beardsley, Bruce Grobbelaar, Julio César Romero, Hugo Sánchez and Graeme Souness. Two players appeared in both the NASL and MLS, spanning a 12-year gap in North American professional soccer: Hugo Sánchez and Roy Wegerle.

Player	Position	NASL years	NASL club(s)	Accolades (outside NASL)
(Brazil) Pelé	FW	1975–1977	New York Cosmos	Three World Cup championships with Brazil in 1958, 1962, 1970; 1973 South American Footballer of the Year
(Brazil) Carlos Alberto	DF	1977–1982	New York Cosmos; California	Captained Brazil to victory at the 1970 World Cup
(Chile) Elías Figueroa	DF	1981	Fort Lauderdale	South American Footballer of the Year in 1974, 1975, and 1976
(England) Alan Ball, Jr.	MF	1978–1980	Philadelphia; Vancouver	Set up two Hurst goals at the 1966 World Cup Final; Played at the 1970 World Cup
(England) Gordon Banks	GK	1977–1978	Fort Lauderdale	GK for England during their 1966 World Cup championship run; Six-time FIFA Goalkeeper of the Year
(England) Geoff Hurst	FW	1976	Seattle	Scored a hat trick for England at the 1966 World Cup Final; 1968 Euro All-Star team
(England) Bobby Moore	DF	1976; 1978	San Antonio; Seattle	Captained England to victory at the 1966 World Cup
(England) Peter Beardsley	FW	1982–1983	Vancouver Whitecaps	England International
(West Germany) Franz Beckenbauer	DF	1977–1980; 1983	New York Cosmos	Captained West Germany to victory at the 1974 World Cup; European Player of the Year 1972 and 1976; FIFA World Cup All-Star team 1966, 1970 and 1974
(West Germany) Gerd Müller	FW	1979–1981	Fort Lauderdale	1970 European Footballer of the Year; Scored 10 goals at the 1970 World Cup; 1974 World Cup winner
(Italy) Roberto Bettega	FW	1983–1984	Toronto Blizzard	Named to the 1978 World Cup All-Star team; Ranked third on Juventus' career goals scored (#2 at time of retirement)
(Netherlands) Johan Cruyff	MF	1979–1981	Los Angeles Aztecs; Washington Diplomats	Led the Netherlands to the 1974 World Cup final; European Footballer of the Year award in 1971, 1973, and 1974
(Netherlands) Ruud Krol	DF	1980	Vancouver Whitecaps	Captain of the Netherlands team that reached the 1978 World Cup Final
(Netherlands) Johan Neeskens	MF	1979–1984	New York Cosmos	Reached World Cup finals with the Netherlands in 1974 and 1978; Named to the 1974 World Cup All-Star team; Won 3 European Cups with Ajax from 1971 to 1973
(Netherlands) Rob Rensenbrink	MF	1980	Portland	Winner of the 1976 Onze d'Or; Reached World Cup finals with the Netherlands in 1974 and 1978; Second leading scorer at the 1978 World Cup
(Netherlands) Wim Suurbier	DF	1979–1983	Los Angeles Aztecs; San Jose Earthquakes	Reached World Cup finals with the Netherlands in 1974 and 1978; Won 3 European Cups with Ajax from 1971 to 1973
(Northern Ireland) George Best	MF	1976–1982	Los Angeles Aztecs; Fort Lauderdale; San Jose	1968 European Footballer of the Year
(Paraguay) Julio César Romero	MF	1980–1983	New York Cosmos	1979 Copa América winner with Paraguay; 1985 South American Footballer of the Year
(Peru) Teófilo Cubillas	FW/MF	1979–1983	Fort Lauderdale	Named Best Young Player of 1970 World Cup; 1972 South American Footballer of the Year; Scored 5 goals in two different World Cups (1970, 1978); Named to 1978 World Cup All-Star team
(Poland) Kazimierz Deyna	MF	1981–1984	San Diego Sockers	Top scorer at the 1972 Olympics; Member of Poland team that finished 3rd at the 1974 World Cup; Won the Bronze Ball as the 3rd best player at the 1974 World Cup
(Portugal) Eusébio	MF	1975–1979	Boston Minutemen; Toronto; Las Vegas	1965 European Footballer of the Year; 1966 World Cup Golden Boot (top scorer)
(Portugal) António Simões	MF	1975–1979	Boston; San Jose; Dallas	1962 European Cup winner with Benfica; Member of Portugal's Magriços team that placed 3rd at 1966 World Cup
(Scotland) Peter Lorimer	MF	1979–1983	Toronto; Vancouver	Scored 255 goals for Leeds United
(Sweden) Björn Nordqvist	DF	1979–1980	Minnesota	Former world record holder with 115 caps; Played at the 1970, 1974, and 1978 World Cups

== Attendance ==
=== Yearly average attendance ===
Season	Average	High Team	Highest	2nd Team	2nd Highest	Low Team	Lowest
1968	4,699	Kansas City Spurs	8,510	Washington Whips	6,840	Los Angeles Wolves	2,441
1969	2,930	Kansas City Spurs	4,273	Atlanta Chiefs	3,371	Baltimore Bays	1,601
1970	3,163	Rochester Lancers	4,506	Washington Darts	3,894	Kansas City Spurs	2,398
1971	4,154	Toronto Metros	5,993	Rochester Lancers	5,871	Montreal Olympique	2,440
1972	4,780	St. Louis Stars	7,773	Toronto Metros	7,173	Miami Gatos	2,112
1973	5,954	Philadelphia Atoms	11,501	Dallas Tornado	7,474	Atlanta Apollos	3,317
1974	7,770	San Jose Earthquakes	16,584	Seattle Sounders	13,454	Toronto Metros	3,458
1975	7,930	San Jose Earthquakes	17,927	Seattle Sounders	16,826	Baltimore Comets	2,641
1976	10,295	Seattle Sounders	23,828	Minnesota Kicks	23,121	Boston Minutemen	2,571
1977	13,558	Cosmos *	34,142	Minnesota Kicks	32,775	Connecticut Bicentennials	3,848
1978	13,084	Cosmos *	47,856	Minnesota Kicks	30,928	Chicago Sting	4,188
1979	14,201	New York Cosmos	46,690	Tampa Bay Rowdies	27,650	Philadelphia Fury	5,626
1980	14,440	New York Cosmos	42,754	Tampa Bay Rowdies	28,435	Philadelphia Fury	4,465
1981	14,084	New York Cosmos	34,835	Montreal Manic	23,704	Dallas Tornado	4,670
1982	13,155	New York Cosmos	28,749	Montreal Manic	21,348	Edmonton Drillers	4,922
1983	13,258	Vancouver Whitecaps	29,166	New York Cosmos	27,242	San Diego Sockers	4,212
1984	10,759	Minnesota Strikers	14,263	Vancouver Whitecaps	13,924	San Diego Sockers	5,702

*Cosmos dropped "New York" from name for 1977 and 1978 seasons

=== Single-game attendance records ===
The New York Cosmos hold 21 of the 24 top attendance records in NASL history. Of the 107 games involving NASL clubs that have drawn 40,000+ fans, 65 were Cosmos' home matches at Giants Stadium (excludes Soccer Bowl '78). The table below ranks teams by the number of 40,000+ crowds they attracted.

Team	40,000+	Highest Single Attendance	Notes
New York Cosmos	65 matches	77,691 vs Fort Lauderdale (1977)	playoff game
Tampa Bay Rowdies	12 matches	56,389 vs California (1980)	Fourth of July fireworks display after game
Minnesota Kicks	8 matches	49,572 vs San Jose (1976)	playoff game
Seattle Sounders	6 matches	58,125 vs New York (1976)	first sporting event in Kingdome
Soccer Bowl	4 matches	74,901 Cosmos vs Tampa Bay (1978)	played in Giants Stadium
Montreal Manic	4 matches	58,542 vs Chicago (1981)	playoff game
Vancouver Whitecaps	3 matches	60,342 vs Seattle (1983)	first sporting event in BC Place
Los Angeles Aztecs	2 matches	48,483 vs Washington (1980)	Fourth of July fireworks display after game
Washington Diplomats	1 match	53,351 vs New York (1980)	nationally televised on ABC
Minnesota Strikers	1 match	52,621 vs Tampa Bay (1984)	Beach Boys concert after game
Team America	1 match	50,108 vs Fort Lauderdale (1983)	Beach Boys concert after game

== See also ==
- List of American and Canadian soccer champions
- North American Soccer League on television
- Record attendances in United States club soccer
- Soccer Bowl

Preceded by American Soccer League	Division 1 soccer league in the United States; 1967–1984	Succeeded by Major League Soccer
