= USA Final 1967 =

Soccer match

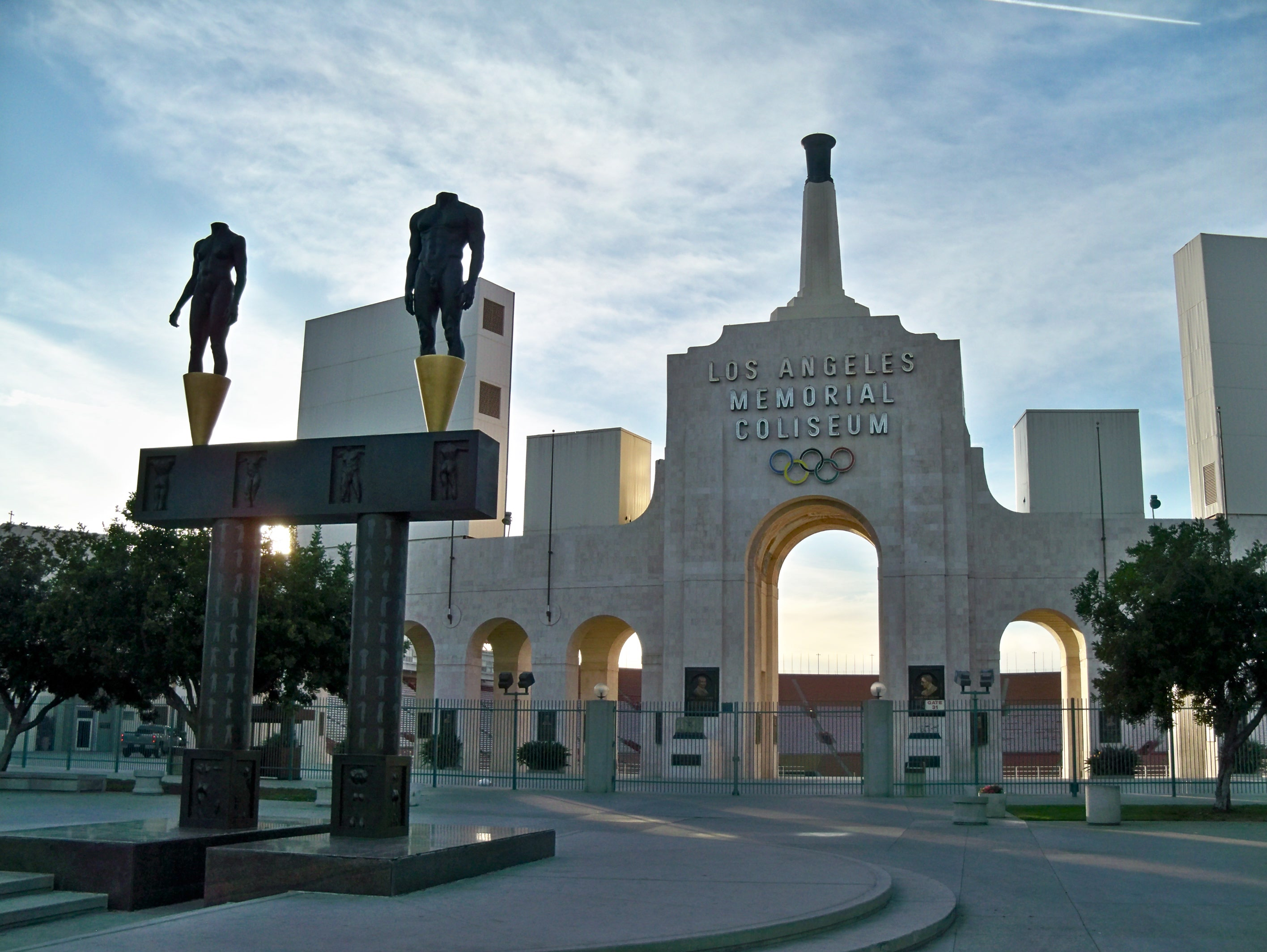
- The Los Angeles Memorial Coliseum hosted the Final
- Event: Soccer Bowl (USA)
Los Angeles Wolves	Washington Whips
6	5
- On sudden-death overtime
- Date: July 14, 1967
- Venue: Memorial Coliseum, Los Angeles
- Referee: Dick Giebner (United States)
- Attendance: 17,842

The USA Final 1967 was the United Soccer Association's first, and only, postseason championship game. The Los Angeles Wolves (composed of players from England's Wolverhampton Wanderers defeated the Washington Whips (made up of members of Scotland's Aberdeen F.C.), 6 to 5, in a sudden-death overtime after 90 minutes of regular play and 30 minutes of extra time, with the win coming from an own goal credited against Washington's Ally Shewan. The title game, a single-game match, took place on July 14, 1967, at the Los Angeles Memorial Coliseum before a crowd of only 17,482 people. The game was described as "the greatest final ever played in American soil".

At the end of regulation, Frank Munro of Washington had tied the game 4 to 4, and then tied it 5 to 5 in the final seconds of extra time. Under the USA rules for playoff games, the winner would be the first team to score if the match was still tied after 120 minutes. Six minutes into overtime, Bobby Thomson of Los Angeles was attempting to pass toward the Washington goal, and his shot rebounded off of Shewan's thigh and into the goal that had been left open by Washington goalie Bobby Clark; the Wolves flew back to England two days later.

== Background ==
A coin flip held on June 27 determined which division champion (Eastern or Western) would host the championship final. The Washington Whips won the Eastern Division with 5 wins, 5 draws and 2 losses for 15 total points. The Los Angeles Wolves won the Western Division, also with 5 wins, 5 draws and 2 losses for 15 points. As division champions, both teams earned the right to compete in the inaugural title game. Although Washington held a slight advantage in goal differential, a coin flip was used to decide that the Western Division winner would be the home side for the final.

== Match details ==
July 14, 1967

Los Angeles Wolves	6–5 (a.e.t.)	Washington Whips
Knowles 3'; Burnside 65', 67', 82'; Dougan 113'; Shewan 122' (o.g.)	Report	Smith 21'; Munro 64' (pen.), 89', 120' (pen.); Storrie 66'

Memorial Coliseum, Los Angeles
Attendance: 17,842
Referee: Dick Giebner (United States)

Los Angeles Wolves	Washington Whips

GK	1	(England) Phil Parkes
DF	2	(England) Gerry Taylor
DF	3	(England) Bobby Thomson
DF	4	(England) John Holsgrove
DF	5	(England) Dave Woodfield
MF	6	(England) Dave Burnside
MF	7	(England) Terry Wharton
MF	8	(England) Ernie Hunt
FW	9	(Northern Ireland) Derek Dougan
FW	10	(England) Peter Knowles
FW	11	(England) Dave Wagstaffe
Manager:
(England) Ronnie Allen

GK	1	(Scotland) Bobby Clark
DF	2	(Scotland) Jim Whyte
DF	3	(Scotland) Ally Shewan
DF	4	(Scotland) Frank Munro
DF	5	(Scotland) Tommy McMillan
MF	6	(Denmark) Jens Petersen
MF	7	(Scotland) Jim Storrie
MF	8	(Scotland) Jimmy Smith	(red card) 37'
FW	9	(Scotland) Davie Johnston
FW	10	(Scotland) Harry Melrose
FW	11	(Scotland) Jimmy Wilson
Manager:
(Scotland) Eddie Turnbull

1967 USA Champions: Los Angeles Wolves
