= 1967 Washington Whips season =

Washington Whips
1967 season
- Chairman: Earl Foreman
- Manager: Eddie Turnbull
- USA: Division: 1st Overall: 1st
- USA Championship: Runners-up
- National Challenge Cup: Did not enter
Home colors	Away colors

The 1967 Washington Whips season was the club's first season of existence, participating in the United Soccer Association (USA), which, at the time, was the top division of American soccer. The Whips were an imported team of Aberdeen F.C. of Scotland. They won the USA's Eastern Division and played the Los Angeles Wolves for the title. A coin toss placed the game in Los Angeles, where the Whips, after playing with 10 players for the last 30 minutes, lost on an own goal scored in extra time by Ally Shewan.

== Competitions ==
=== United Soccer Association ===
==== Standings ====
Pos	Team	Pld	W	D	L	GF	GA	GD	Pts	Qualification
1	Washington Whips	12	5	5	2	19	11	+8	15	1967 USA Championship
2	Cleveland Stokers	12	5	4	3	19	13	+6	14	
3	Toronto City	12	4	5	3	23	17	+6	13	
4	Detroit Cougars	12	3	6	3	11	18	−7	12	
5	New York Skyliners	12	2	6	4	15	17	−2	10	
6	Boston Rovers	12	2	3	7	12	26	−14	7	

Source: American Soccer History Archives
Rules for classification: 1) points; 2) goal difference; 3) number of goals scored.
Note: 2 points for a win, 1 point for a tie, 0 points for a loss

The Whips played the Los Angeles Wolves on June 20, a game that ended in a tie. But the Whips protested because the Wolves were allowed an illegal substitution. On July 6, the commissioner upheld the protest, the game was vacated and a "do-over" was played on July 10. Washington won that match 3-0 thereby winning the division.

==== Match results ====
May 26, 1967 1	Washington Whips	1–2	Cleveland Stokers	Washington, D.C.
	Storrie	Report	Vernon; Setters	Stadium: D.C. Stadium; Attendance: 9,403

May 31, 1967 2	Toronto City	1–2	Washington Whips	Toronto, Ontario
	Cormack	Report	Storrie; Smith	Stadium: Varsity Stadium; Attendance: 12,000

June 4, 1967 3	Washington Whips	1–1	Chicago Mustangs	Washington, D.C.
	Storrie	Report	Boninsegna	Stadium: D.C. Stadium; Attendance: 6,125

June 7, 1967 4	Washington Whips	3–0	New York Skyliners	Washington, D.C.
	Wilson; Own goal Smith	Report		Stadium: D.C. Stadium; Attendance: 5,112

June 11, 1967 5	Detroit Cougars	2–2	Washington Whips	Detroit, Michigan
	Thompson	Report	J. Wilson; P. Wilson	Stadium: Tiger Stadium; Attendance: 5,134

June 14, 1967 6	Cleveland Stokers	2–2	Washington Whips	Cleveland, Ohio
	Dobing; Eastham	Report	Shewan; P. Wilson	Stadium: Cleveland Municipal Stadium; Attendance: 6,162

June 20, 1967 7	Washington Whips	1–1	Los Angeles Wolves	Washington, D.C.
	Burnside	Report	J. Wilson	Stadium: D.C. Stadium; Attendance: 7,847

July 8, 1967 12	Washington Whips	1-2	Boston Shamrock Rovers	Washington, D.C.
	Frank Munro		Frank O'Neill (footballer); Billy Dixon	Stadium: D.C. Stadium; Attendance: 9,760

=== USA Championship ===
July 14, 1967 Final	Los Angeles Wolves	6–5 (a.e.t.)	Washington Whips	Los Angeles, California
	Knowles 3'; Burnside 65', 67', 82'; Dougan 113'; Shewan 122' (o.g.)		Smith 21'; Munro 64', 89', 120'; Storrie 66'	Stadium: Los Angeles Memorial Coliseum; Attendance: 17,842

== See also ==
- 1966–67 Aberdeen F.C. season
- 1967–68 Aberdeen F.C. season
- 1967 in American soccer
- United Soccer Association
- Washington Whips
- Washington Darts
- Washington Diplomats
- D.C. United
