= 1967 Scottish Cup final =

1967 Scottish Cup Final
- Event: 1966–67 Scottish Cup
Celtic	Aberdeen
2	0
- Date: 29 April 1967
- Venue: Hampden Park, Glasgow
- Referee: Willie Syme
- Attendance: 126,102

The 1967 Scottish Cup Final was played on 29 April 1967 at Hampden Park in Glasgow and was the final match of the 82nd Scottish Cup. The match was contested by Celtic and Aberdeen, and the match was won 2–0 by Celtic with goals from Willie Wallace.

== Match details ==
29 April 1967

Celtic	2–0	Aberdeen
Wallace 42', 49'	Report

Hampden Park, Glasgow
Attendance: 126,102
Referee: Willie Syme

CELTIC:
GK	(Scotland) Ronnie Simpson
DF	(Scotland) Jim Craig
DF	(Scotland) Billy McNeill (c)
DF	(Scotland) John Clark
DF	(Scotland) Tommy Gemmell
MF	(Scotland) Jimmy Johnstone
MF	(Scotland) Bobby Murdoch
MF	(Scotland) Bertie Auld
MF	(Scotland) Bobby Lennox
FW	(Scotland) Willie Wallace
FW	(Scotland) Stevie Chalmers
Manager:
(Scotland) Jock Stein

ABERDEEN:
GK	(Scotland) Bobby Clark
DF	(Scotland) Jim Whyte
DF	(Scotland) Tommy McMillan
DF	(Scotland) Frank Munro
DF	(Scotland) Ally Shewan
MF	(Scotland) Jimmy Wilson
MF	(Denmark) Jens Petersen
MF	(Scotland) Jimmy Smith
MF	(Scotland) Davie Johnston
FW	(Scotland) Harry Melrose (c)
FW	(Scotland) Jim Storrie
Manager:
(Scotland) Eddie Turnbull

== See also ==
- 1966–67 in Scottish football
