= 1967–68 Aberdeen F.C. season =

Aberdeen F.C.
1967–68 season
- Chairman: Charles B. Forbes
- Manager: Eddie Turnbull
- Scottish League Division One: 5th
- Scottish Cup: 2nd Round
- Scottish League Cup: Group Stage
- European Cup Winners' Cup: 2nd Round
- Top goalscorer: League: Davie Johnston (17); All: Davie Johnston (17)
- Highest home attendance: 36,000 vs. Rangers, 12 August 1967
- Lowest home attendance: 6,000 x2 vs. Stirling Albion, 16 December 1967 vs. Kilmarnock, 6 April 1968
Home colours

The 1967–68 season was Aberdeen's 56th season in the top flight of Scottish football and their 57th season overall. Aberdeen competed in the Scottish League Division One, Scottish League Cup, Scottish Cup and in European competition for the first time in the Dons' history when they competed in the European Cup Winners' Cup.

== Results ==
Own goal scorers in italics.

=== Division 1 ===
Match Day	Date	Opponent	H/A	Score	Aberdeen Scorer(s)	Attendance
1	9 September	Dundee	H	4–2	Taylor (2), Storrie, Munro	15,000
2	16 September	St Johnstone	A	1–1	Wilson	6,400
3	23 September	Clyde	H	1–2	Watt	12,000
4	30 September	Morton	A	3–3	Wilson, Watt, Johnston	4,500
5	7 October	Dunfermline Athletic	H	0–1		12,500
6	14 October	Dundee United	H	6–0	Johnston (2), Taylor, Munro, Smith	9,000
7	21 October	Heart of Midlothian	A	1–2	Storrie	11,000
8	4 November	Partick Thistle	A	2–2	Smith, Little	6,530
9	11 November	Raith Rovers	H	6–2	Petersen (2), Johnston, Little, Mackie, Wilson	8,000
10	18 November	Hibernian	A	0–1		11,000
11	25 November	Motherwell	H	2–1	Wilson, Melrose	9,000
12	2 December	Falkirk	A	2–2	Melrose, Smith	4,500
13	9 December	Kilmarnock	A	0–3		8,755
14	16 December	Stirling Albion	H	1–0	Shewan	6,000
15	23 December	Airdrieonians	A	0–1		4,000
16	30 December	Rangers	H	1–4	Smith	20,000
17	1 January	Dundee	A	2–0	Johnston, Buchanan	10,000
18	20 January	Dunfermline Athletic	A	2–4	Johnston, Buchanan	9,650
19	3 February	Dundee United	A	3–2	Murray, Smith, Johnston	6,500
20	10 February	Heart of Midlothian	H	2–0	Craig, Johnston	12,000
21	12 February	Morton	H	1–0	Robb	10,000
22	2 March	Partick Thistle	H	0–1	Robb, Johnston	7,000
23	6 March	Celtic	A	1–4	Johnston	28,000
24	9 March	Raith Rovers	A	1–3	Taylor	5,000
25	16 March	Hibernian	H	5–0	Johnston (2), Smith, Taylor, Buchan	7,000
26	23 March	Motherwell	A	3–0	Watt, Cumming, Smith	2,360
27	27 March	Clyde	H	0–1		5,500
28	30 March	Falkirk	H	2–0	Shewan, Johnston	5,000
29	6 April	Kilmarnock	H	1–1	Johnston	6,000
30	10 April	Celtic	H	0–1		22,000
31	13 April	Stirling Albion	A	3–0	Petersen, Robb, Smith	1,600
32	17 April	St Johnstone	H	1–0	Buchan	6,500
33	20 April	Airdrieonians	H	3–2	Little, Robb, Smith	8,000
34	27 April	Rangers	A	3–2	Johnston (2), Taylor	40,000

==== Final standings ====
Pos	Team	Pld	W	D	L	GF	GA	GD	Pts
3	Hibernian	34	20	5	9	67	49	+18	45
4	Dunfermline Athletic	34	17	5	12	64	41	+23	39
5	Aberdeen	34	16	5	13	63	48	+15	37
6	Morton	34	15	6	13	57	53	+4	36
7	Kilmarnock	34	13	8	13	59	57	+2	34

Source: "1967-1968 First Division - SPFL Archive". SPFL.

=== Scottish League Cup ===
==== Group 2 ====
Round	Date	Opponent	H/A	Score	Aberdeen Scorer(s)	Attendance
1	12 August	Rangers	H	1–1	Storrie	36,000
2	16 August	Dundee United	A	0–5		7,550
3	19 August	Celtic	A	1–3	Storrie	50,000
4	26 August	Rangers	A	0–3		50,000
5	30 August	Dundee United	H	2–2	Storrie, Munro	10,000
6	2 September	Celtic	H	1–5	Smith	22,216

==== Group 2 final table ====
Team	Pld	W	D	L	GF	GA	GR	Pts
Celtic	6	5	1	0	14	4	3.500	11
Rangers	6	3	2	1	10	5	2.000	8
Dundee United	6	1	1	4	7	8	0.875	3
Aberdeen	6	0	2	4	5	19	0.263	2

=== Scottish Cup ===
Round	Date	Opponent	H/A	Score	Aberdeen Scorer(s)	Attendance
R1	27 January	Raith Rovers	H	1–1	Robb	10,700
R1R	31 January	Raith Rovers	A	1–0	Reid	3,500
R2	19 February	Dunfermline Athletic	A	1–2	Smith	14,700

=== European Cup Winners' Cup ===
Round	Date	Opponent	H/A	Score	Aberdeen Scorer(s)	Attendance
R1 L1	6 September	(Iceland) KR Reykjavic	H	10–0	Munro (3), Smith (2), Storrie (2), McMillan, Taylor, Petersen	14,000
R1 L2	13 September	(Iceland) KR Reykjavic	A	4–1	Storrie (2), Buchan, Munro	1,500
R2 L1	29 November	(Belgium) Standard Liège	A	0–3		30,000
R2 L2	6 December	(Belgium) Standard Liège	H	2–0	Munro, Melrose	13,000

== Squad ==
=== Appearances & Goals ===
No.	Pos	Nat	Player	Total		Division One		Scottish Cup		League Cup		Cup Winners' Cup	
No.	Pos	Nat	Player	Apps	Goals	Apps	Goals	Apps	Goals	Apps	Goals	Apps	Goals
	GK	(Scotland) SCO	Bobby Clark	46	0	33	0	3	0	6	0	4	0
	GK	(Scotland) SCO	Ernie McGarr	1	0	1	0	0	0	0	0	0	0
	DF	(Scotland) SCO	Ally Shewan	47	3	34	3	3	0	6	0	4	0
	DF	(Scotland) SCO	Tommy McMillan	46	1	33	0	3	0	6	0	4	1
	DF	(Denmark) DEN	Jens Petersen (c)	43	4	32	3	2	0	6	0	3	1
	DF	(Scotland) SCO	Jim Whyte	41	0	28	0	3	0	6	0	4	0
	DF	(Scotland) SCO	Martin Buchan	34	3	24	2	3	0	5	0	2	1
	DF	(Scotland) SCO	Jim Hermiston	6	0	6	0	0	0	0	0	0	0
	DF	(Scotland) SCO	Eddie Buchanan	5	1	4	1	1	0	0	0	0	0
	DF	(England) ENG	Jim Kirkland	1	0	0	0	0	0	0	0	1	0
	MF	(Scotland) SCO	Frank Munro	24	8	14	2	0	0	6	1	4	5
	MF	(Scotland) SCO	Ian Taylor	20	7	15	6	0	0	3	0	2	1
	MF	(Scotland) SCO	Jimmy Wilson	18	3	10	3	0	0	4	0	4	0
	MF	(Scotland) SCO	Tommy Craig	17	1	14	1	3	0	0	0	0	0
	MF	(Scotland) SCO	George Murray	13	1	10	1	3	0	0	0	0	0
	MF	(Scotland) SCO	Willie Watt	11	3	11	3	0	0	0	0	0	0
	MF	(Scotland) SCO	Pat Wilson	4	0	1	0	0	0	3	0	0	0
	FW	(Scotland) SCO	Jimmy Smith	43	13	33	9	3	1	3	1	4	2
	FW	(Scotland) SCO	Dave Johnston	36	16	28	16	3	0	4	0	1	0
	FW	(Scotland) SCO	Dave Robb	25	4	18	3	3	1	2	0	2	0
	FW	(Scotland) SCO	Billy Little	17	3	15	3	1	0	0	0	1	0
	FW	(Scotland) SCO	Jimmy Storrie	14	9	6	2	0	0	6	3	2	4
	FW	(Scotland) SCO	Harry Melrose	11	3	8	2	0	0	1	0	2	1
	FW	(Scotland) SCO	Ian Cumming	5	1	5	1	0	0	0	0	0	0
	FW	(Scotland) SCO	Dave Millar	2	0	2	0	0	0	0	0	0	0
