= 1968–69 Aberdeen F.C. season =

Aberdeen F.C.
1968–69 season
- Chairman: Charles B. Forbes
- Manager: Eddie Turnbull
- Scottish League Division One: 15th
- Scottish Cup: Semi-final
- Scottish League Cup: Group Stage
- Inter-Cities Fairs Cup: 2nd round
- Top goalscorer: League: Jim Forrest (17); All: Jim Forrest (24)
- Highest home attendance: 31,000 vs. Celtic, 11 January 1969
- Lowest home attendance: 7,000 x2 vs. Falkirk, 21 December 1968 vs. Dunfermline Athletic, 24 March 1969
Home colours

The 1968–69 season was Aberdeen's 57th season in the top flight of Scottish football and their 58th season overall. Aberdeen competed in the Scottish League Division One, Scottish League Cup, Scottish Cup and the Fairs Cup.

== Results ==
Own goal scorers in italics

=== Division 1 ===
| Match Day | Date | Opponent | H/A | Score | Aberdeen Scorer(s) | Attendance |
|---|---|---|---|---|---|---|
| 1 | 7 September | Dundee | A | 4–4 | Robb (2), Taylor, Shewan | 10,000 |
| 2 | 14 September | St Johnstone | H | 2–0 | Smith, Craig | 11,000 |
| 3 | 21 September | Dundee United | H | 0–1 | | 13,000 |
| 4 | 28 September | Celtic | A | 1–2 | Rae | 35,000 |
| 5 | 5 October | Heart of Midlothian | H | 1–2 | Robb | 12,000 |
| 6 | 12 October | Partick Thistle | A | 0–1 | | 5,500 |
| 7 | 19 October | Clyde | H | 0–1 | | 8,000 |
| 8 | 26 October | Rangers | A | 3–2 | Forrest (2), Johnston | 40,000 |
| 9 | 2 November | Raith Rovers | H | 2–1 | Forrest, Craig | 8,000 |
| 10 | 9 November | Morton | A | 0–1 | | 5,000 |
| 11 | 16 November | Arbroath | H | 2–2 | Robb, Forrest | 8,000 |
| 12 | 23 November | St Mirren | H | 2–0 | Forrest (2) | 12,000 |
| 13 | 30 November | Kilmarnock | A | 1–5 | Craig | 6,500 |
| 14 | 7 December | Hibernian | H | 2–6 | Buchan, Forrest | 11,500 |
| 15 | 14 December | Airdrieonians | A | 0–2 | | 3,500 |
| 16 | 21 December | Falkirk | H | 2–0 | Forrest (2), Johnston | 7,000 |
| 17 | 28 December | Kilmarnock | A | 1–2 | Johnston | 6,500 |
| 18 | 1 January | Dundee | H | 0–0 | | 12,000 |
| 19 | 2 January | St Johnstone | A | 1–3 | Buchan | 7,000 |
| 20 | 4 January | Dundee United | A | 4–1 | Shewan, Robb, Craig, Forrest | 15,000 |
| 21 | 11 January | Celtic | H | 1–3 | Forrest | 31,000 |
| 22 | 18 January | Heart of Midlothian | A | 2–3 | Robb, Johnston | 8,000 |
| 23 | 1 February | Partick Thistle | H | 1–1 | Craig | 8,000 |
| 24 | 8 March | Arbroath | A | 1–2 | Forrest | 4,700 |
| 25 | 15 March | St Mirren | A | 2–1 | Robb, Connell | 3,750 |
| 26 | 19 March | Raith Rovers | A | 2–3 | Johnston, Forrest | 5,000 |
| 27 | 24 March | Dunfermline Athletic | H | 2–2 | Robb, Craig | 7,000 |
| 28 | 29 March | Hibernian | A | 1–1 | Forrest | 6,321 |
| 29 | 2 April | Morton | H | 6–3 | Johnston (2), Petersen, Craig, Forrest, Whyte | 10,000 |
| 30 | 5 April | Airdrieonians | H | 3–1 | Forrest, Johnston, Robb | 11,000 |
| 31 | 9 April | Rangers | H | 0–0 | | 23,000 |
| 32 | 12 April | Falkirk | A | 0–1 | | 2,500 |
| 33 | 19 April | Kilmarnock | H | 0–1 | | 8,000 |
| 34 | 23 April | Clyde | A | 1–1 | Forrest | 987 |

==== Final standings ====
| Pos | Team | Pld | W | D | L | GF | GA | GD | Pts |
|---|---|---|---|---|---|---|---|---|---|
| 13 | Clyde | 34 | 9 | 13 | 12 | 35 | 50 | −15 | 31 |
| 14 | Partick Thistle | 34 | 9 | 10 | 15 | 39 | 53 | −14 | 28 |
| 15 | Aberdeen | 34 | 9 | 8 | 17 | 50 | 59 | −9 | 26 |
| 16 | Raith Rovers | 34 | 8 | 5 | 21 | 45 | 67 | −22 | 21 |
| 17 | Falkirk | 34 | 5 | 8 | 21 | 33 | 69 | −36 | 18 |

Source: "1968-1969 First Division - SPFL Archive". SPFL.

=== Scottish League Cup ===
==== Group 3 ====
| Round | Date | Opponent | H/A | Score | Aberdeen Scorer(s) | Attendance |
|---|---|---|---|---|---|---|
| 1 | 10 August | Clyde | A | 1–4 | Robb | 5,000 |
| 2 | 14 August | Dunfermline Athletic | H | 1–0 | Forrest | 18,000 |
| 3 | 17 August | Dundee United | H | 4–1 | Forrest (2), Buchan, Craig | 16,000 |
| 4 | 24 August | Clyde | H | 0–2 | | 19,000 |
| 5 | 28 August | Dunfermline Athletic | A | 2–1 | Smith, Taylor | 8,000 |
| 6 | 31 August | Dundee United | A | 0–1 | | 12,000 |

==== Group 3 final table ====
| Team | Pld | W | D | L | GF | GA | GR | Pts |
|---|---|---|---|---|---|---|---|---|
| Clyde | 6 | 4 | 0 | 2 | 13 | 9 | 1.444 | 8 |
| Dundee United | 6 | 3 | 0 | 3 | 12 | 11 | 1.091 | 6 |
| Aberdeen | 6 | 3 | 0 | 3 | 8 | 9 | 0.889 | 6 |
| Dunfermline Athletic | 6 | 2 | 0 | 4 | 7 | 11 | 0.636 | 4 |

=== Scottish Cup ===
| Round | Date | Opponent | H/A | Score | Aberdeen Scorer(s) | Attendance |
|---|---|---|---|---|---|---|
| R1 | 25 January | Berwick Rangers | H | 3–0 | Forrest (2), Robb | 13,600 |
| R2 | 25 February | Dunfermline Athletic | H | 2–2 | Johnston, Hamilton | 14,685 |
| R2R | 26 February | Dunfermline Athletic | A | 2–2 | Robb (2) | 17,500 |
| QF | 1 March | Kilmarnock | H | 0–0 | | 24,000 |
| QFR | 5 March | Kilmarnock | A | 3–0 | Robb, Craig, Hamilton | 17,183 |
| SF | 22 March | Rangers | N | 1–6 | Forrest | 39,250 |

=== Inter-Cities Fairs Cup ===
| Round | Date | Opponent | H/A | Score | Aberdeen Scorer(s) | Attendance |
|---|---|---|---|---|---|---|
| R1 L1 | 17 September | (Bulgaria) Slavia Sofia | A | 0–0 | | 13,000 |
| R1 L2 | 2 October | (Bulgaria) Slavia Sofia | H | 2–0 | Robb, Taylor | 29,000 |
| R2 L1 | 23 October | (Spain) Real Zaragoza | H | 2–1 | Forrest, Smith | 25,000 |
| R2 L2 | 30 October | (Spain) Real Zaragoza | A | 0–3 | | 30,000 |

== Squad ==
=== Appearances & Goals ===
| No. | Pos | Nat | Player | Total | | Division One | | Scottish Cup | | League Cup | | Inter-Cities Fairs Cup | |
| No. | Pos | Nat | Player | Apps | Goals | Apps | Goals | Apps | Goals | Apps | Goals | Apps | Goals |
|---|---|---|---|---|---|---|---|---|---|---|---|---|---|
| | GK | (Scotland) SCO | Ernie McGarr | 26 | 0 | 20 | 0 | 6 | 0 | 0 | 0 | 0 | 0 |
| | GK | (Scotland) SCO | Bobby Clark | 24 | 0 | 14 | 0 | 0 | 0 | 6 | 0 | 4 | 0 |
| | DF | (Scotland) SCO | Ally Shewan | 50 | 2 | 34 | 2 | 6 | 0 | 6 | 0 | 4 | 0 |
| | DF | (Denmark) DEN | Jens Petersen (c) | 50 | 1 | 34 | 1 | 6 | 0 | 6 | 0 | 4 | 0 |
| | DF | (Scotland) SCO | Martin Buchan | 43 | 3 | 27 | 2 | 6 | 0 | 6 | 1 | 4 | 0 |
| | DF | (Scotland) SCO | Jim Whyte | 31 | 1 | 19 | 1 | 6 | 0 | 6 | 0 | 0 | 0 |
| | DF | (Scotland) SCO | Tommy McMillan | 26 | 0 | 16 | 0 | 0 | 0 | 6 | 0 | 4 | 0 |
| | DF | (Denmark) DEN | Henning Boel | 21 | 0 | 15 | 0 | 6 | 0 | 0 | 0 | 0 | 0 |
| | DF | (Scotland) SCO | Jim Hermiston | 18 | 0 | 14 | 0 | 0 | 0 | 0 | 0 | 4 | 0 |
| | DF | (Scotland) SCO | Benny McCabe | 0 | 0 | 0 | 0 | 0 | 0 | 0 | 0 | 0 | 0 |
| | MF | (Scotland) SCO | Tommy Craig | 45 | 9 | 31 | 7 | 4 | 1 | 6 | 1 | 4 | 0 |
| | MF | (Scotland) SCO | Ian Taylor | 24 | 3 | 14 | 1 | 2 | 0 | 5 | 1 | 3 | 1 |
| | MF | (Scotland) SCO | Tommy Rae | 16 | 1 | 8 | 1 | 0 | 0 | 6 | 0 | 2 | 0 |
| | MF | (Scotland) SCO | George Murray | 10 | 0 | 10 | 0 | 0 | 0 | 0 | 0 | 0 | 0 |
| | MF | (Scotland) SCO | George Buchan | 4 | 0 | 4 | 0 | 0 | 0 | 0 | 0 | 0 | 0 |
| | MF | (Scotland) SCO | Billy Paul | 1 | 0 | 1 | 0 | 0 | 0 | 0 | 0 | 0 | 0 |
| | MF | (Scotland) SCO | Willie Watt | 1 | 0 | 1 | 0 | 0 | 0 | 0 | 0 | 0 | 0 |
| | FW | (Scotland) SCO | Jim Forrest | 47 | 23 | 31 | 16 | 6 | 3 | 6 | 3 | 4 | 1 |
| | FW | (Scotland) SCO | Jimmy Smith | 45 | 3 | 33 | 1 | 6 | 0 | 2 | 1 | 4 | 1 |
| | FW | (Scotland) SCO | Dave Robb | 40 | 15 | 26 | 9 | 6 | 4 | 5 | 1 | 3 | 1 |
| | FW | (Scotland) SCO | Dave Johnston | 36 | 9 | 27 | 8 | 6 | 1 | 2 | 0 | 1 | 0 |
| | FW | (Scotland) SCO | Jim Hamilton | 11 | 2 | 7 | 0 | 4 | 2 | 0 | 0 | 0 | 0 |
| | FW | (Scotland) SCO | Billy Little | 1 | 0 | 1 | 0 | 0 | 0 | 0 | 0 | 0 | 0 |
| | FW | (Scotland) SCO | Ian Cumming | 1 | 0 | 1 | 0 | 0 | 0 | 0 | 0 | 0 | 0 |
| | FW | (Scotland) SCO | Tommy Wilson | 0 | 0 | 0 | 0 | 0 | 0 | 0 | 0 | 0 | 0 |
