= 1966–67 Aberdeen F.C. season =

Aberdeen F.C.
1966–67 season
- Chairman: Charles B. Forbes
- Manager: Eddie Turnbull
- Scottish League Division One: 4th
- Scottish Cup: Finalists
- Scottish League Cup: Semi-finalists
- Top goalscorer: League: Jimmy Wilson (14); All: Jim Smith (21)
- Highest home attendance: 44,000 vs. Hibernian, 22 March 1967
- Lowest home attendance: 5,000 x2 vs. St Johnstone, 13 August 1966 vs. Clyde, 1 October 1966
Home colours

The 1966–67 season was Aberdeen's 55th season in the top flight of Scottish football and their 56th season overall. Aberdeen competed in the Scottish League Division One, Scottish League Cup and Scottish Cup.

== Results ==
Own goal scorers in italics.

=== Division 1 ===
Match Day	Date	Opponent	H/A	Score	Aberdeen Scorer(s)	Attendance
1	10 September	Dundee	A	1–2	Wilson	10,000
2	17 September	St Johnstone	H	3–2	Winchester (2), Smith	7,000
3	24 September	Rangers	H	0–3		30,000
4	1 October	Clyde	H	1–1	Winchester	5,000
5	8 October	Dunfermline Athletic	A	1–1	Shewan	8,500
6	15 October	Ayr United	H	2–0	Smith, Winchester	7,000
7	22 October	Airdrieonians	A	1–2	Taylor, Wilson	4,320
8	29 October	Hibernian	H	2–2	Winchester, Watt	10,000
9	5 November	Heart of Midlothian	H	3–1	Watt (2), Taylor	10,000
10	12 November	St Mirren	A	3–1	Watt (2), Winchester	5,500
11	19 November	Partick Thistle	H	5–2	Wilson (2), Petersen, Whyte, Winchester	9,500
12	26 November	Dundee United	A	3–1	Winchester, Briggs, Wilson	7,210
13	3 December	Motherwell	H	2–1	Wilson (2)	8,000
14	10 December	Falkirk	A	0–1		4,565
15	17 December	Stirling Albion	A	6–2	Wilson (3), Whyte, Johnston, Taylor	1,375
16	24 December	Celtic	H	1–1	Melrose	28,000
17	31 December	Kilmarnock	H	4–0	Melrose, Smith, Wilson, Munro	14,000
18	2 January	Dundee	H	5–2	Munro (2), Melrose, Smith, Wilson	17,000
19	3 January	St Johnstone	A	0–1		8,200
20	14 January	Clyde	A	0–0		5,500
21	18 January	Rangers	H	1–2	Johnston	31,000
22	21 January	Dunfermline Athletic	H	1–2	Winchester	9,000
23	4 February	Ayr United	A	5–2	Smith (2), Robb, Johnston, Whyte	3,100
24	11 February	Airdrieonians	H	7–0	Johnston (3), Wilson (2), Munro, Smith	8,000
25	25 February	Hibernian	A	0–1		18,500
26	4 March	Heart of Midlothian	A	0–3	Johnston (2), Smith	12,000
27	18 March	Partick Thistle	A	1–1	Storrie	4,000
28	25 March	Dundee United	H	0–1		13,000
29	27 March	St Mirren	A	0–0		10,000
30	4 April	Motherwell	A	2–3	Winchester, Smith	4,500
31	8 April	Falkirk	H	6–1	Johnston (2), Munro (2), Melrose, Smith	7,000
32	15 April	Stirling Albion	H	1–0	Melrose	7,500
33	19 April	Celtic	A	0–0		33,000
34	1 May	Kilmarnock	A	1–1	McGrory	5,500

==== Final standings ====
Pos	Team	Pld	W	D	L	GF	GA	GD	Pts
2	Rangers	34	24	7	3	92	31	+61	55
3	Clyde	34	20	6	8	64	48	+16	46
4	Aberdeen	34	17	8	9	72	38	+34	42
5	Hibernian	34	19	4	11	72	49	+23	42
6	Dundee	34	16	9	9	74	51	+23	41

Source: RSSSF

=== Scottish League Cup ===
==== Group 1 ====
Round	Date	Opponent	H/A	Score	Aberdeen Scorer(s)	Attendance
1	13 August	St Johnstone	H	3–0	Smith (2), Little	5,000
2	17 August	Dundee	A	4–3	Winchester (2), Wilson	9,500
3	20 August	Dundee United	H	4–1	Winchester, Briggs (own goal), Smith, Melrose	11,000
4	27 August	St Johnstone	A	3–0	Wilson, Winchester, Little	5,000
5	31 August	Dundee	H	2–0	Smith, Melrose	12,000
6	3 September	Dundee United	A	4–3	Whyte (2), Wilson, Little	5,000

==== Group 1 final table ====
Team	Pld	W	D	L	GF	GA	GR	Pts
Aberdeen	6	6	0	0	20	7	2.857	12
Dundee United	6	2	2	2	13	13	1.000	6
Dundee	6	1	2	3	8	11	0.727	4
St Johnstone	6	0	2	4	6	16	0.375	2

==== Knockout stage ====
Round	Date	Opponent	H/A	Score	Aberdeen Scorer(s)	Attendance
QFL1	14 September	Morton	A	1–3	Smith	4,750
QFL2	21 September	Morton	H	3–0	Winchester, Smith, Petersen	19,000
SF	19 October	Rangers	N	2–2	Wilson, Shewan	38,600
SFR	24 October	Rangers	N	0–2		38,000

=== Scottish Cup ===
Round	Date	Opponent	H/A	Score	Aberdeen Scorer(s)	Attendance
R1	28 January	Dundee	A	5–0	Smith (2), Johnston (2), Wilson	23,000
R2	18 February	St Johnstone	H	5–0	Johnston (2), Wilson, Smith, Melrose	22,800
QF	11 March	Hibernian	A	1–1	Smith	37,200
QFR	22 March	Hibernian	H	3–0	Winchester (2), Storrie	44,000
SF	1 April	Dundee United	N	1–0	Millar	41,500
Final	29 April	Celtic	N	0–2		126,102

== Squad ==
=== Appearances & Goals ===
No.	Pos	Nat	Player	Total		Division One		Scottish Cup		League Cup	
No.	Pos	Nat	Player	Apps	Goals	Apps	Goals	Apps	Goals	Apps	Goals
	GK	(Scotland) SCO	Bobby Clark	50	0	34	0	6	0	10	0
	GK	(Scotland) SCO	Ernie McGarr	0	0	0	0	0	0	0	0
	DF	(Scotland) SCO	Ally Shewan	50	2	34	1	6	0	10	1
	DF	(Scotland) SCO	Tommy McMillan	48	0	32	0	6	0	10	0
	DF	(Scotland) SCO	Jim Whyte	46	5	30	3	6	0	10	2
	DF	(Denmark) DEN	Jens Petersen	46	2	30	1	6	0	10	1
	DF	(Scotland) SCO	Martin Buchan	4	0	4	0	0	0	0	0
	DF	(Scotland) SCO	Jim Hermiston	4	0	4	0	0	0	0	0
	DF	(Scotland) SCO	Benny McCabe	1	0	1	0	0	0	0	0
	MF	(Scotland) SCO	Jimmy Wilson	47	20	31	13	6	2	10	5
	MF	(Scotland) SCO	Frank Munro	35	7	29	6	6	1	0	0
	MF	(Scotland) SCO	Ian Taylor	13	3	13	3	0	0	0	0
	MF	(Scotland) SCO	Pat Wilson	6	0	5	0	0	0	1	0
	MF	(Scotland) SCO	Willie Watt	5	5	5	5	0	0	0	0
	MF	(Scotland) SCO	Dave Smith	0	0	0	0	0	0	0	0
	FW	(Scotland) SCO	Jimmy Smith	45	20	30	10	5	4	10	6
	FW	(Scotland) SCO	Harry Melrose (c)	43	8	27	5	6	1	10	2
	FW	(Scotland) SCO	Ernie Winchester	29	16	18	10	1	1	10	5
	FW	(Scotland) SCO	Dave Johnston	26	14	20	10	6	4	0	0
	FW	(Scotland) SCO	Billy Little	25	4	14	1	1	0	10	3
	FW	(Scotland) SCO	Dave Millar	19	0	9	0	0	0	10	0
	FW	(Scotland) SCO	Jimmy Storrie	11	2	7	1	4	1	0	0
	FW	(Scotland) SCO	Dave Robb	4	1	3	1	1	0	0	0
