= 1969–70 Aberdeen F.C. season =

Aberdeen F.C.
1969–70 season
- Chairman: Charles B. Forbes
- Manager: Eddie Turnbull
- Scottish League Division One: 8th
- Scottish Cup: Winners
- Scottish League Cup: Quarter final
- Top goalscorer: League: Davie Robb (16); All: Davie Robb (19)
- Highest home attendance: 33,000 vs. Celtic, 10 September 1969
- Lowest home attendance: 6,500 vs. Kilmarnock, 6 April 1970
- Average home league attendance: 11,147
Home colours

The 1969–70 season was Aberdeen's 58th season in the top flight of Scottish football and their 59th season overall. Aberdeen competed in the Scottish League Division One, Scottish League Cup and Scottish Cup, which they won for the second time, beating Celtic 3–1 at Hampden Park.

== Squad ==
=== Appearances & Goals ===
No.	Pos	Nat	Player	Total		Division 1		Scottish Cup		League Cup	
No.	Pos	Nat	Player	Apps	Goals	Apps	Goals	Apps	Goals	Apps	Goals
	FW	(Scotland) SCO	George Adams	3	0	1	0	1	0	1	0
	DF	(Denmark) DEN	Henning Boel	40	0	28	0	5	0	7	0
	MF	(Scotland) SCO	George Buchan	7	1	4	1	1	0	2	0
	DF	(Scotland) SCO	Martin Buchan (c)	24	2	19	2	5	0	0	0
	GK	(Scotland) SCO	Bobby Clark	17	0	13	0	4	0	0	0
	FW	(Scotland) SCO	Jim Forrest	46	18	33	15	5	1	8	2
	MF	(Scotland) SCO	Arthur Graham	6	2	5	2	1	0	0	0
	MF	(Scotland) SCO	Jim Hamilton	34	4	23	3	4	0	7	1
	FW	(Scotland) SCO	Joe Harper	28	9	24	6	4	3	0	0
	DF	(Scotland) SCO	Jim Hermiston	37	3	26	2	3	0	8	1
	DF	(Scotland) SCO	Jim Kirkland	13	0	13	0	0	0	0	0
	GK	(Scotland) SCO	Ernie McGarr	32	0	23	0	1	0	8	0
	MF	(Scotland) SCO	Brian McIlroy	6	0	6	0	0	0	0	0
	FW	(Scotland) SCO	Derek McKay	16	4	13	0	3	4	0	0
	MF	(Scotland) SCO	Tommy McMillan	37	0	24	0	5	0	8	0
	DF	(Scotland) SCO	George Murray	44	2	34	2	5	0	5	0
	MF	(Scotland) SCO	Steve Murray	7	0	7	0	0	0	0	0
	DF	(Denmark) DEN	Jens Petersen	30	2	20	2	2	0	8	0
	FW	(Scotland) SCO	Tommy Rae	5	1	4	1	0	0	1	0
	FW	(Scotland) SCO	Davie Robb	45	19	33	16	4	3	8	0
	FW	(Scotland) SCO	Alex Smith	4	1	1	0	0	0	3	1
	DF	(Scotland) SCO	Tom Sutherland	5	0	5	0	0	0	0	0
	FW	(Scotland) SCO	Ian Taylor	1	0	1	0	0	0	0	0
	DF	(Scotland) SCO	Jim Whyte	4	0	3	0	0	0	1	0
	MF	(Scotland) SCO	Alex Willoughby	26	1	19	0	1	0	6	1
	FW	(Scotland) SCO	Tommy Wilson	19	4	11	1	0	0	8	3

== Results ==
Own goals in italics

=== Division 1 ===
Match Day	Date	Opponent	H/A	Score	Aberdeen Scorer(s)	Attendance
1	30 August	Clyde	H	6–0	Petersen, Robb (3), Forrest (2)	12,500
2	3 September	Rangers	A	0–2		40,000
3	6 September	Airdrieonians	A	4–3	Rae, Robb (2), Forrest	2,000
4	13 September	Greenock Morton	H	2–2	Wilson, Hamilton	14,000
5	20 September	St Johnstone	A	1–3	Forrest	9,400
6	27 September	Dundee	H	1–1	Hermiston	13,000
7	4 October	Ayr United	A	2–1	Robb (2)	9,100
8	11 October	Partick Thistle	H	2–1	Harper, Hamilton	12,500
9	29 October	Celtic	H	2–3	Robb, Fallon	25,000
10	1 November	Dunfermline Athletic	A	1–2	Forrest	7,000
11	5 November	St Mirren	A	0–2		4,000
12	8 November	Dundee United	H	0–0		8,000
13	15 November	Heart of Midlothian	A	2–2	Robb, Forrest	11,500
14	22 November	Motherwell	H	4–1	Hermiston, M. Buchan, Robb, Forrest	7,000
15	29 November	Kilmarnock	A	2–0	Harper, Forrest	5,000
16	13 December	Clyde	A	1–2	Harper	2,000
17	20 December	Rangers	H	2–3	Robb (2)	22,000
18	27 December	Raith Rovers	A	1–0	Hamilton	4,000
19	1 January	Dundee	A	0–2		12,000
20	10 January	Raith Rovers	H	5–1	Robb, G. Murray, Harper (3)	8,000
21	17 January	Greenock Morton	A	2–3	Robb, Ferguson	6,500
22	20 January	Airdrieonians	H	0–1		8,500
23	25 February	Ayr United	H	1–0	M. Buchan	8,000
24	28 February	Partick Thistle	A	3–0	Petersen, Forrest (2)	5,500
25	2 March	St Johnstone	H	0–0		7,000
26	9 March	Hibernian	H	0–2		8,500
27	18 March	St Mirren	H	1–1	Robb	9,000
28	21 March	Dunfermline Athletic	H	2–0	Forrest (2)	10,000
29	25 March	Celtic	A	2–1	G. Murray, Graham	33,000
30	28 March	Dundee United	A	0–2		8,000
31	4 April	Heart of Midlothian	H	0–1		10,000
32	6 April	Kilmarnock	H	2–2	G. Buchan, Graham	6,500
33	13 April	Hibernian	A	2–1	Robb, Forrest	10,000
34	18 April	Motherwell	A	2–0	Forrest (2)	6,100

==== Final standings ====
Pos	Team	Pld	W	D	L	GF	GA	GD	Pts
6	Dundee	34	15	6	13	49	44	+5	36
7	Kilmarnock	34	13	10	11	62	57	+5	36
8	Aberdeen	34	14	7	13	55	45	+10	35
9	Morton	34	13	9	12	52	52	0	35
10	Dunfermline Athletic	34	15	5	14	45	45	0	35

Source: "1969-1970 First Division - SPFL Archive". SPFL.

=== Scottish League Cup ===
==== Group 2 ====
Round	Date	Opponent	H/A	Score	Aberdeen Scorer(s)	Attendance
1	9 August	Dunfermline Athletic	H	2–2	Smith, Forrest	16,000
2	13 August	Clyde	A	0–0		4,000
3	16 August	Hibernian	H	2–2	Hermiston, Hamilton	16,000
4	20 August	Clyde	H	3–0	Wilson (3)	13,500
5	23 August	Dunfermline Athletic	A	1–0	Willoughby	8,000
6	27 August	Hibernian	A	0–0		18,300

==== Group 2 final table ====
Team	Pld	W	D	L	GF	GA	GR	Pts
Aberdeen	6	2	4	0	8	4	2.000	8
Hibernian	6	2	2	2	10	9	1.111	6
Dunfermline Athletic	6	1	3	2	5	6	0.833	5
Clyde	6	1	3	2	4	8	0.500	5

==== Quarter final ====
Round	Date	Opponent	H/A	Score	Aberdeen Scorer(s)	Attendance
QF L1	10 September	Celtic	H	0–0		33,000
QF L2	24 September	Celtic	A	1–2	Forrest	37,500

=== Scottish Cup ===
Round	Date	Opponent	H/A	Score	Aberdeen Scorer(s)	Attendance
R1	24 January	Clyde	H	4–0	Robb (2), Harper (2)	12,000
R2	11 February	Clydebank	H	2–1	Forrest, Robb	13,100
QF	21 February	Falkirk	A	1–0	McKay	13,500
SF	14 March	Kilmarnock	N	1–0	McKay	25,812
F	11 April	Celtic	N	3–1	McKay (2), Harper	108,434
