= Dave Wagstaffe =

English footballer

Personal information
- Full name: David Wagstaffe
- Date of birth: 5 April 1943
- Place of birth: Manchester, England
- Date of death: 6 August 2013 (aged 70)
- Place of death: Wolverhampton, England
- Height: 5 ft 8 in (1.73 m)
- Position: Winger

Youth career
- Manchester City

Senior career*
Years	Team	Apps	(Gls)
1960–1964	Manchester City	144	(8)
1964–1976	Wolverhampton Wanderers	324	(26)
1967	→ Los Angeles Wolves (loan)	10	(0)
1976–1978	Blackburn Rovers	75	(7)
1978–1979	Blackpool	19	(1)
1979	Blackburn Rovers	2	(0)
Total		574	(42)
- * Club domestic league appearances and goals

David Wagstaffe (5 April 1943 – 6 August 2013) was an English professional footballer who played as a left winger. Wagstaffe made over 500 league appearances throughout his career, which saw him represent Manchester City, Wolves, Blackburn and Blackpool in England and briefly the Los Angeles Wolves in the United States.

He was notably the first player to be shown a red card in the English Football League, sent off for Blackburn during a 1–0 defeat against Leyton Orient on 2 October 1976.

== Career ==
Born in Openshaw, Manchester, Wagstaffe played in England and the United States for Manchester City, Wolverhampton Wanderers, Los Angeles Wolves, Blackburn Rovers and Blackpool.

Having signed for Wolves on Boxing Day in 1964, Wagstaffe went on to play 404 league and cup games for the club, placing him in the top 15 all-time appearance makers for Wolves. Although not a prolific goal scorer, he won Match of the Day's goal of the month in 1971 for a 35-yard shot as Wolves went on to beat Arsenal 5–1, as well as scoring in the second leg of the UEFA Cup Final against Tottenham Hotspur the same year.

Wagstaffe featured in the Wolves side that were competing in the United States of America in the inaugural United Soccer Association league as Los Angeles Wolves in 1967. The LA Wolves went on to win the Western Division, finally beating the Washington Whips (represented by Aberdeen) in the final. During his time in the United States, Wagstaffe was visited by boyhood friend Davy Jones, lead singer of The Monkees who he had played street football with as a boy. Jack Kent Cooke, a cable television entrepreneur and owner of the Los Angeles Lakers basketball team who had bought the LA Wolves franchise for $250,000, asked Wagstaffe to move to the United States and join his potential business as potential face of American soccer, but after returning to Wolverhampton, Wagstaffe decided against pursuing the opportunity.

Whilst at Blackburn Rovers on 2 October 1976, Wagstaffe was the first player in English football to receive a red card.

Despite Wagstaffe's talent, he was never capped for England, though he was selected to play on the left wing in the Football League versus the Scottish League match at Ayresome Park, Middlesbrough, in 1972.

== Later life and death ==
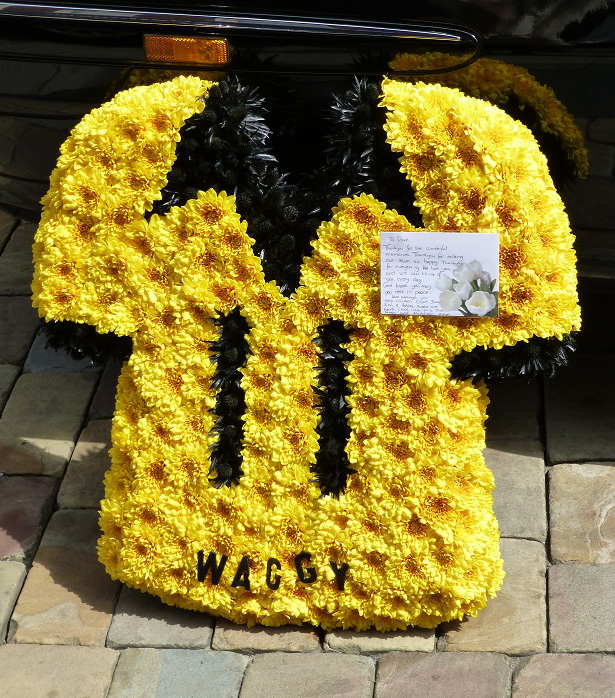
Floral tribute to Dave Wagstaffe

After retiring from football, Wagstaffe ran the Queenscliffe Hotel and became steward of the Bispham Conservative Club in Blackpool, before returning to Wolverhampton and running the Butler's Arms in Bushbury, the Old Wulfrunians Club in Castlecroft, Hednesford Ex-Servicemens Club and Waggy's Bar in the Stan Cullis Stand at Molineux.

In January 2013, Wagstaffe was inducted into Wolverhampton Wanderers' Hall of Fame. Wagstaffe suffered a heart attack in April 2013, and died at his home in Wolverhampton on 6 August 2013 after a short illness, aged 70. His funeral, attended by hundreds of fans, took place at Wolverhampton's St Peter's Collegiate Church on 22 August 2013.

== Honours ==
Wolverhampton Wanderers

- Football League Cup: 1973–74
