= Willie Wallace =

Scottish footballer and coach

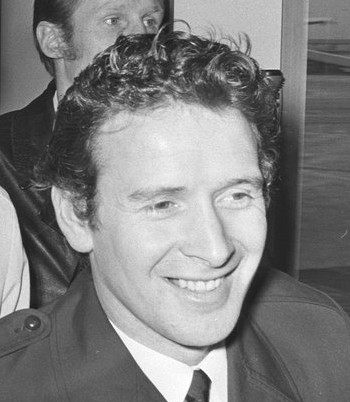
- Wallace in 1971

Personal information
- Full name: William Semple Brown Wallace
- Date of birth: 23 June 1940 (age 86)
- Place of birth: Kirkintilloch, Scotland
- Position: Inside forward

Youth career
- Kelvinside Athletic

Senior career*
Years	Team	Apps	(Gls)
- Kilsyth Rangers
1958–1959	Stenhousemuir	50	(23)
1959–1961	Raith Rovers	56	(23)
1961–1966	Heart of Midlothian	173	(91)
1966–1971	Celtic	142	(89)
1971–1972	Crystal Palace	39	(4)
1972–1975	Dumbarton	84	(21)
1975–1976	APIA Leichhardt		
1977	Partick Thistle	0	(0)
1977	Ross County	3	(0)
Total		547	(251)

International career
1964–1969	Scotland	7	(0)
1965–1969	Scottish League XI	4	(3)

Managerial career
- 1982–1983: Wollongong City
- * Club domestic league appearances and goals

William Semple Brown Wallace (born 23 June 1940) is a Scottish former football player and coach. He won the European Cup with Celtic in 1967 along with several domestic honours. His other clubs included Stenhousemuir, Raith Rovers, Heart of Midlothian and Dumbarton in the Scottish leagues, and Crystal Palace in English football.

Wallace played for Scotland seven times and was inducted into the national Hall of Fame in 2017 for his club achievements.

== Club career ==
=== Early career ===
He started his senior playing career with Stenhousemuir as a teenager in 1958 (having played alongside Jim Storrie at Kilsyth Rangers), moving to Raith Rovers a year later. It was in Kirkcaldy that "Wispy", as Wallace was nicknamed, developed his reputation as a top-class goal poacher, his skills being rewarded with a first Scottish League cap.

=== Hearts ===
Wallace's form attracted attention from larger clubs, Heart of Midlothian eventually spending £15,000 to take him to Edinburgh in April 1961. The increased pressure for success at Tynecastle initially curtailed his scoring exploits, for he was expected to replace no less a figure than Alex Young, the "Golden Vision", whom Hearts had sold to Everton a couple of months earlier. By season 1962–63, however, Wallace was fully settled into the tactics of manager Tommy Walker, and he would become Hearts' top scorer for the next four seasons through to 1965–66. In doing so, he helped Hearts win the Scottish League Cup in 1962 and come within a goal of winning the 1964–65 Scottish Football League title, while gaining full international recognition for Scotland.

In 1966, however, his form plummeted and his goalscoring ceased and, amid rumours that he had been "tapped" up by another club, his departure from Tynecastle was widely anticipated. The surprise was that his destination wasn't boyhood favourites Rangers but their nemesis Celtic, for whom Jock Stein paid £30,000 to secure his services. He played a total of 248 matches for Hearts in all competitions, scoring 131 goals.

=== Celtic ===
Within six months of joining Celtic, Wallace was to attain Scottish footballing immortality, as one of the "Lisbon Lions", the famous team who won the European Cup in 1967. He was later part of the team that reached the 1970 European Cup Final but was defeated 2–1 by Feyenoord. He also won the league championship in each of the five seasons he was at the Glasgow club, plus the Scottish Cup in 1967, 1969 and 1971 and the League Cup in 1967 and 1968 during an era widely considered the greatest in the club's history. In total, he scored 140 goals for Celtic in 239 games.

=== Later career ===
After five fruitful years with Celtic, Wallace and team-mate John Hughes were sold to Crystal Palace in October 1971 for a combined fee of £30,000. Neither enjoyed great success in South London and Wallace was back in Scotland with Dumbarton less than a year later. As his career wound down, he moved to Australia in March 1975 to play for APIA, where he won two league titles before returning to Scotland in March 1977, first to Partick Thistle for a week, before becoming player-coach at Ross County for the rest of the 1976–77 season.

== International career ==
In total, Wallace was capped seven times for Scotland and four times for the Scottish Football League XI. He was part of the Scotland team that defeated England at Wembley in 1967.

== Style of play ==
Throughout his career, Wallace was a prolific goalscorer, possessing a powerful shot with either leg, which led him many times to score from the 25 to 35 yard range. Despite not being a tall player, Wallace was also good in the air. Wallace was also capable of creating chances for his teammates to score goals themselves and play in different positions. In the second leg of the semi-finals against Dukla Prague in the European Cup, Stein tasked Wallace with man-marking its star player, Josef Masopust.

== Career after retirement ==
Retiring as a player in June 1977, he joined the coaching staff at Dundee. When this role ended he returned to APIA as a coach, eventually settling in Sydney and starting his own sports shop.

In 2008, Tommy Burns, a former Celtic player and manager, died; Wallace helped organise a tribute match played on 31 May 2009 at Celtic Park, attended by over 35,000 people. The Celtic squad of the time defeated the 'Tommy Burns Select' team 11–4. In July of the same year, Wallace arranged a friendly match in Australia (where he had lived for the past 30 years) between Celtic and the local professional club Brisbane Roar; Celtic won 3–0.

== Coaching career ==
Wallace took over coaching the Wollongong City side at the tail end of the 1982 campaign, replacing Ken Morton, relieving captain Chris Dunleavy of his caretaker duties. Wollongong finished third on the ladder, qualifying for the finals series, however they lost 0–2 to St George FC in the preliminary final. Wallace was retained for the 1983 campaign but the team recorded the lowest number of wins in the league, finishing second last. Wallace was replaced by former socceroo, Adrian Alston for the 1984 season.

== Career statistics ==
=== International appearances ===
As of 4 March 2019

International statistics
National team	Year	Apps	Goals
Scotland	1964	1	0
Scotland	1965	—	
Scotland	1966	2	0
Scotland	1967	3	0
Scotland	1968	—	
Scotland	1969	1	0
Total		7	0

== Honours ==
Heart of Midlothian

- Scottish League Cup: 1962–63

Celtic

- European Cup: 1966–67
- Scottish Division One (5): 1966–67, 1967–68, 1968–69, 1969–70, 1970–71
- Scottish Cup (3): 1966–67, 1968–69, 1970–71
- Scottish League Cup (2): 1967–68, 1968–69

APIA Leichhardt

- NPL NSW Championship: 1976
- NPL NSW Minor Premiers: 1975

Scotland

- British Home Championship: 1966–67

== See also ==
- List of footballers in Scotland by number of league appearances (500+)
- List of footballers in Scotland by number of league goals (200+)
