= Bobby Clark (footballer, born 1945) =

Scottish footballer (born 1945)

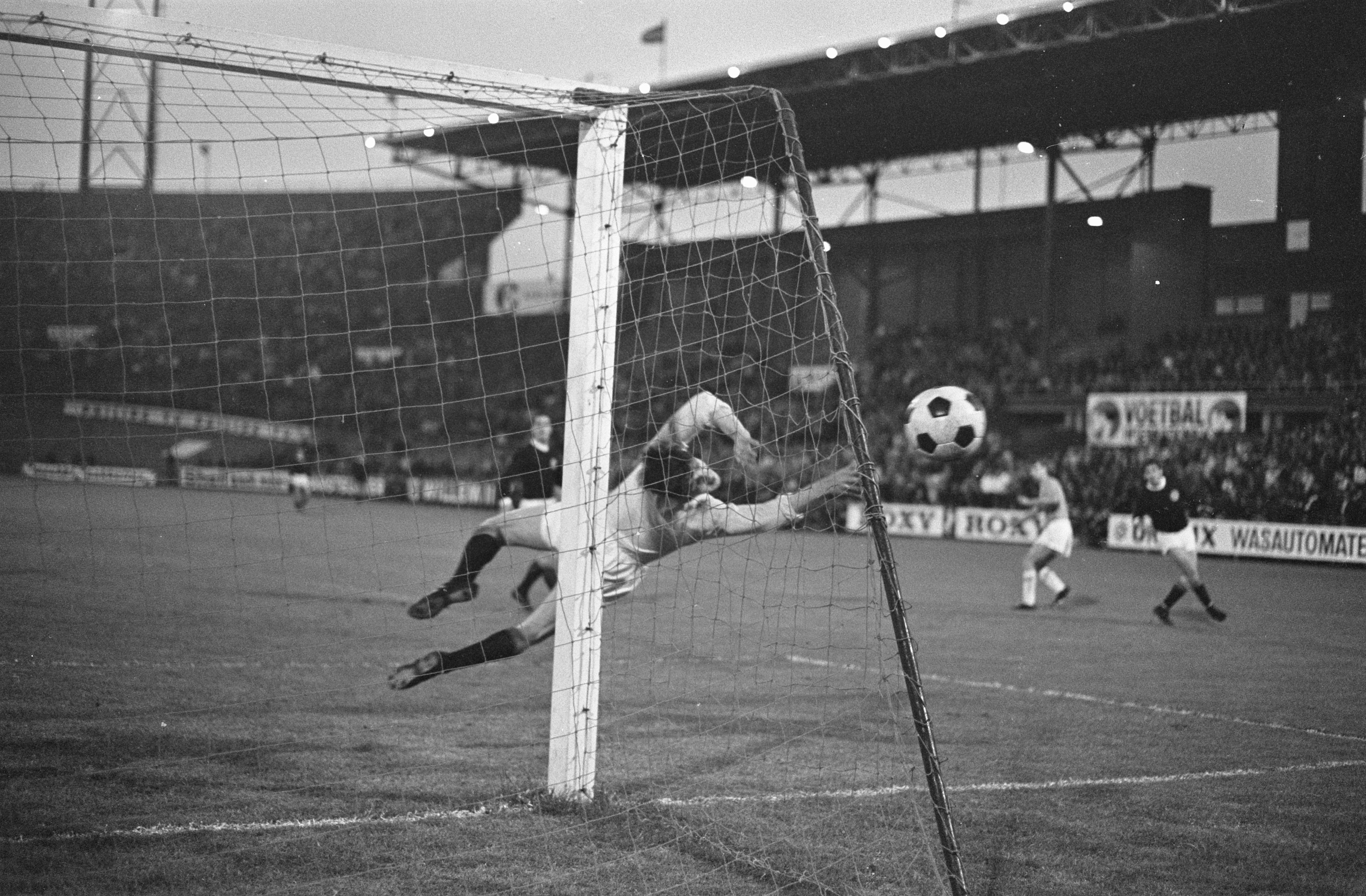
- Clark with Scotland in 1968

Personal information
- Full name: Robert Brown Clark
- Date of birth: 26 September 1945 (age 81)
- Place of birth: Glasgow, Scotland
- Height: 1.83 m (6 ft 0 in)
- Position: Goalkeeper

Senior career*
| Years | Team | Apps | (Gls) |
| 1962–1965 | Queen's Park | 84 | (0) |
| 1965–1982 | Aberdeen | 424 | (0) |
| 1967 | → Washington Whips (loan) | 12 | (0) |
| 1976 | → San Antonio Thunder (loan) | 19 | (0) |
| 1983 | Clyde | 4 | (0) |
| Total | | 543 | (0) |

International career
| 1966–1968 | Scotland U23 | 3 | (0) |
| 1967–1973 | Scotland | 17 | (0) |
| 1971 | Scottish League XI | 1 | (0) |
| 1976–1977 | Scotland U21 | 3 | (0) |

Managerial career
- 1984–1985: Highlanders
- 1985–1993: Dartmouth Big Green
- 1994–1996: New Zealand
- 1996–2000: Stanford Cardinal
- 2001–2017: Notre Dame Fighting Irish
Medal record
Men's football
Representing New Zealand (as manager)
OFC Nations Cup
| Bronze medal – third place | 1996 |
OFC U-23 Championship
| Silver medal – second place | 1996 |
- * Club domestic league appearances and goals

Robert Brown Clark (born 26 September 1945) is a Scottish football player and coach. Clark, who played as a goalkeeper, spent most of his playing career with Aberdeen. He also played for Queen's Park, Washington Whips, San Antonio Thunder and Clyde. Clark played 17 times for Scotland and represented the Scottish League. He later became a coach, mainly working in New Zealand and the United States.

== Playing career ==
Clark started his senior career in Scotland's second tier with Queen's Park F.C. then in 1965 signed for top division Aberdeen F.C., with whom he won the 1970 Scottish Cup, the 1976 League Cup and the 1980 Premier League Championship. During his time with the Dons, Clark played some games as a defender, including against Rangers at Ibrox Park, after losing his place in goal to Ernie McGarr. With 594 competitive appearances for Aberdeen between 1965 and 1980, he is ranked third in the club's all-time list.

Clark graduated from Jordanhill College in Glasgow, Scotland in 1967 with a degree in Physical Education. He was named first team all-star goalkeeper in the 1967 United Soccer Association playing for the Washington Whips and making the USA All Star Team. He also spent the summer of 1976, on loan, in the NASL, playing for the San Antonio Thunder.

A fan of Scottish First Division side Clyde, Clark came out of retirement in 1983 to help Clyde when they had a goalkeeping injury crisis. His father, Tom, was once the chairman of Clyde. In autumn 1984 he once more came out of retirement to keep goal for Forres Mechanics in a 1–0 victory over Buckie Thistle in the Highland League Cup Final held at Elgin.

Clark set the British top-flight record for not conceding a goal in consecutive, all-competition matches (at 1,155 minutes) in the 1970–71 season, until Edwin van der Sar set a new mark on 8 February 2009. He also briefly held the world record, until Bulgarian goalkeeper Stoyan Yordanov set a new record of 1202 minutes in May 1971. Fraser Forster broke the Scottish league record in 2014 and was congratulated by Clark after the match in which it was surpassed. He still holds the Aberdeen club record, although this was threatened by the form of Scott Brown in early 2015.

He earned 17 caps for the Scotland national team, and was Scotland's backup goalkeeper at the 1978 FIFA World Cup.

== Managerial career ==
Clark coached Highlanders F.C., Bulawayo (1983–84), Dartmouth College (1985–93), the New Zealand national football team (1994–96), Stanford University (1996–2000) and the University of Notre Dame men's soccer team (2001–2017), winning the national title in 2013 with the Irish.

In November 2018, Clark was one of four inductees into the Aberdeen Hall of Fame.

== Personal life ==
His son Jamie has played in Major League Soccer and is the head coach of the Washington Huskies men's soccer team. His son Tommy, a paediatrician, is the founder and executive director of the HIV prevention organisation Grassroot Soccer. His daughter, Jennifer Clark, is also a football coach and is the head women's coach at Claremont-McKenna in California.

== Career statistics ==
=== Club ===
Appearances and goals by club, season and competition
| Club | Season | League | | | National cup | | League cup | | Europe | | Total | |
| Club | Season | Division | Apps | Goals | Apps | Goals | Apps | Goals | Apps | Goals | Apps | Goals |
|---|---|---|---|---|---|---|---|---|---|---|---|---|
| Queens' Park | 1962–63 | Scottish Division Two | 18 | 0 | 3 | 0 | 0 | 0 | 0 | 0 | 21 | 0 |
| Queens' Park | 1963–64 | Scottish Division Two | 31 | 0 | 2 | 0 | 6 | 0 | 0 | 0 | 39 | 0 |
| Queens' Park | 1964–65 | Scottish Division Two | 35 | 0 | 6 | 0 | 6 | 0 | 0 | 0 | 47 | 0 |
| Queens' Park | Total | | 84 | 0 | 11 | 0 | 12 | 0 | 0 | 0 | 107 | 0 |
| Aberdeen | 1965–66 | Scottish Division One | 33 | 0 | 5 | 0 | 2 | 0 | 0 | 0 | 40 | 0 |
| Aberdeen | 1966–67 | Scottish Division One | 34 | 0 | 6 | 0 | 10 | 0 | 0 | 0 | 50 | 0 |
| Aberdeen | 1967–68 | Scottish Division One | 33 | 0 | 3 | 0 | 6 | 0 | 4 | 0 | 46 | 0 |
| Aberdeen | 1968–69 | Scottish Division One | 14 | 0 | 0 | 0 | 6 | 0 | 4 | 0 | 24 | 0 |
| Aberdeen | 1969–70 | Scottish Division One | 14 | 0 | 4 | 0 | 0 | 0 | 0 | 0 | 18 | 0 |
| Aberdeen | 1970–71 | Scottish Division One | 34 | 0 | 4 | 0 | 6 | 0 | 2 | 0 | 46 | 0 |
| Aberdeen | 1971–72 | Scottish Division One | 22 | 0 | 1 | 0 | 6 | 0 | 3 | 0 | 32 | 0 |
| Aberdeen | 1972–73 | Scottish Division One | 33 | 0 | 4 | 0 | 11 | 0 | 1 | 0 | 49 | 0 |
| Aberdeen | 1973–74 | Scottish Division One | 34 | 0 | 1 | 0 | 10 | 0 | 4 | 0 | 49 | 0 |
| Aberdeen | 1974–75 | Scottish Division One | 33 | 0 | 4 | 0 | 4 | 0 | 0 | 0 | 41 | 0 |
| Aberdeen | 1975–76 | Scottish Premier Division | 20 | 0 | 0 | 0 | 6 | 0 | 0 | 0 | 26 | 0 |
| Aberdeen | 1976–77 | Scottish Premier Division | 27 | 0 | 3 | 0 | 8 | 0 | 0 | 0 | 38 | 0 |
| Aberdeen | 1977–78 | Scottish Premier Division | 36 | 0 | 6 | 0 | 6 | 0 | 2 | 0 | 50 | 0 |
| Aberdeen | 1978–79 | Scottish Premier Division | 23 | 0 | 4 | 0 | 3 | 0 | 1 | 0 | 31 | 0 |
| Aberdeen | 1979–80 | Scottish Premier Division | 34 | 0 | 4 | 0 | 11 | 0 | 2 | 0 | 51 | 0 |
| Aberdeen | 1980–81 | Scottish Premier Division | 0 | 0 | 0 | 0 | 0 | 0 | 0 | 0 | 0 | 0 |
| Aberdeen | 1981–82 | Scottish Premier Division | 0 | 0 | 0 | 0 | 0 | 0 | 0 | 0 | 0 | 0 |
| Aberdeen | Total | | 424 | 0 | 49 | 0 | 95 | 0 | 23 | 0 | 591 | 0 |
| Washington Whips (loan) | 1967 | United Soccer Association | 12 | 0 | 1 | 0 | 0 | 0 | 0 | 0 | 13 | 0 |
| San Antonio Thunder (loan) | 1976 | North American Soccer League | 19 | 0 | 0 | 0 | 0 | 0 | 0 | 0 | 19 | 0 |
| Clyde | 1982–83 | Scottish First Division | 4 | 0 | 0 | 0 | 0 | 0 | 0 | 0 | 4 | 0 |
| Career total | | | 543 | 0 | 61 | 0 | 107 | 0 | 23 | 0 | 734 | 0 |

=== International ===
Appearances and goals by national team and year
| National team | Year | Apps | Goals |
|---|---|---|---|
| Scotland | 1967 | 1 | 0 |
| Scotland | 1968 | 1 | 0 |
| Scotland | 1969 | — | |
| Scotland | 1970 | 1 | 0 |
| Scotland | 1971 | 7 | 0 |
| Scotland | 1972 | 6 | 0 |
| Scotland | 1973 | 1 | 0 |
| Total | | 17 | 0 |

== Honours ==
=== Player ===
Aberdeen

- Scottish Premier Division: 1979–80
- Scottish Cup: 1969–70; runner-up 1966–67, 1977–78
- Scottish League Cup: 1976–77; runner-up 1978–79, 1979–80
- Drybrough Cup: 1971–72, 1980–81

Washington Whips

- USA Championship runner-up: 1967
- USA Eastern Division: 1967

Forres Mechanics

- Highland League Cup: 1984–85

Scotland

- British Home Championship: 1971–72 (shared)

Individual

- Aberdeen Player of the Year: 1966–67
- Press and Journal Sports Personality of the Year: 1977–78
- Aberdeen FC Hall of Fame: Inducted, 2018

=== Manager ===
Dartmouth Big Green

- Ivy League Tournament: 1988, 1990, 1992

Stanford Cardinal

- NCAA Tournament Championship runner-up: 1998
- MPSF Mountain Division Championship: 1997

Notre Dame Fighting Irish

- NCAA Tournament Championship: 2013
- Conference Championship: 2003, 2012
- Conference Regular Season Title: 2004, 2007, 2008, 2013, 2014

Individual

- USC College Coach of the Year: 2013
- MPSF Mountain Division Coach of the Year: 1996, 1997
- NSCAA Far West Region Coach of the Year: 1997
- NCAA Region I Coach of the Year: Twice with Dartmouth
- Jim McCullen Trophy: 1995

== See also ==
- List of footballers in Scotland by number of league appearances (500+)
