= George Murray (footballer) =

Scottish footballer

Personal information
- Date of birth: 16 May 1942 (age 84)
- Place of birth: Bellshill, Scotland
- Height: 1.80 m (5 ft 11 in)
- Position: Wing half

Youth career
- Kilmarnock Amateurs

Senior career*
| Years | Team | Apps | (Gls) |
| 1962–1968 | Motherwell | 127 | (16) |
| 1968–1973 | Aberdeen | 89 | (4) |
| Total | | 216 | (20) |

International career
| 1964–1965 | Scotland U23 | 3 | (0) |
| 1965 | Scottish League XI | 1 | (0) |

Managerial career
- 1975: Aberdeen (caretaker)
- 1981–1983: Canberra Arrows
- * Club domestic league appearances and goals

George Murray (born 16 May 1942) is a Scottish former professional footballer who played as a wing half.

== Career ==
Born in Bellshill, Murray played for Kilmarnock Amateurs, Motherwell and Aberdeen.

Murray was caretaker manager of Aberdeen for four matches in 1975.

Between 1981 and 1983 Murray was head coach of Canberra Arrows in the Australian National Soccer League.

His younger brother Cammy was also a footballer, mainly for St Mirren.

== Career statistics ==
Appearances and goals by club, season and competition
| Club | Season | League | | | Scottish Cup | | League Cup | | Europe | | Total | |
| Club | Season | Division | Apps | Goals | Apps | Goals | Apps | Goals | Apps | Goals | Apps | Goals |
|---|---|---|---|---|---|---|---|---|---|---|---|---|
| Aberdeen | 1967–68 | Scottish Division One | 10 | 1 | 3 | 0 | 0 | 0 | 0 | 0 | 13 | 1 |
| Aberdeen | 1968–69 | Scottish Division One | 10 | 0 | 0 | 0 | 0 | 0 | 0 | 0 | 10 | 0 |
| Aberdeen | 1969–70 | Scottish Division One | 34 | 2 | 5 | 0 | 5 | 0 | 0 | 0 | 44 | 2 |
| Aberdeen | 1970–71 | Scottish Division One | 5 | 0 | 0 | 0 | 6 | 0 | 2 | 0 | 13 | 0 |
| Aberdeen | 1971–72 | Scottish Division One | 23 | 1 | 3 | 0 | 3 | 0 | 4 | 0 | 33 | 1 |
| Aberdeen | 1972–73 | Scottish Division One | 7 | 0 | 0 | 0 | 6 | 0 | 1 | 0 | 14 | 0 |
| Total | | | 89 | 4 | 11 | 0 | 20 | 0 | 7 | 0 | 127 | 4 |

== Managerial record ==
| Team | From | To | Record | | | | |
| Team | From | To | P | W | L | D | Win % |
|---|---|---|---|---|---|---|---|
| Aberdeen (caretaker) | 1975 | 1975 | 4 | 2 | 2 | 0 | 50.00% |
