= Cammy Murray =

Scottish footballer (1944–2025)

- Murray in the 1975–76 season

Personal information
- Full name: Robert Cameron Murray
- Date of birth: 20 June 1944
- Place of birth: Bellshill, North Lanarkshire, Scotland
- Date of death: 19 February 2025 (aged 80)
- Position: Right-back

Youth career
- Drumchapel Amateurs

Senior career*
Years	Team	Apps	(Gls)
1962–1972	St Mirren	417	(0)
1972–1973	Motherwell	9	(1)
1973–1978	Arbroath	180	(17)
Total		606	(18)
- * Club domestic league appearances and goals

Robert Cameron Murray (20 June 1944 – 19 February 2025), better known as Cammy Murray, was a Scottish professional footballer. He played as a right-back for St Mirren, Motherwell and Arbroath throughout the 1960s and 1970s.

== Career ==
Murray began his career by playing for St Mirren in the 1962–63 Scottish Division One following his youth career at the Drumchapel Amateurs with his debut match being a 3–3 draw against Hibernian. Throughout the next decade of his senior career, he would play in around 417 matches including the club's promotion to back to the Division One following the club becoming champions in the 1967–68 Scottish Division Two. During his tenure with the club, he would continue to hold the club record of having the most consecutive league appearances from August 1962 to April 1967 with 170 appearances.

Despite his initial success with the Buddies, during his brief stint with Motherwell, he would be relegated as a reserve as a sweeper before playing midfield within the senior team, making only nine appearances with a single goal for the 1972–73 Scottish Division One. Following this, he would then play for Arbroath. Murray would describe his career with Arbroath as being his favorite due to his teammates as well as the leadership of club manager Bert Henderson. He would play for the club until his last match on 15 April 1978 as a reserve in a 2–1 loss against Airdrieonians following a career with 180 matches and 17 goals.

== Personal life and death ==
Cammy was the younger brother of fellow Scottish footballer George Murray who primarily played for Motherwell and Aberdeen. Following his retirement from professional football as a player, he would briefly return to Motherwell as part of the non-playing staff. In 2019, Murray was inducted into the St Mirren Hall of Fame. He died on 19 February 2025, at the age of 80.
