= Jimmy Smith (footballer, born 1947) =

Scottish footballer

Personal information
- Full name: James Smith
- Date of birth: 20 January 1947 (age 79)
- Place of birth: Glasgow, Scotland
- Position: Midfielder

Youth career
- Benburb

Senior career*
Years	Team	Apps	(Gls)
1965–1969	Aberdeen	103	(21)
1967	→ Washington Whips	11	(5)
1969–1975	Newcastle United	129	(13)
1975	→ Celtic (loan)	0	(0)
Total		243	(39)

International career
1968–1974	Scotland	4	(0)
1968	Scottish League XI	1	(0)
- * Club domestic league appearances and goals

James Smith (born 20 January 1947 in Glasgow) is a Scottish former footballer. Smith played for Aberdeen, Washington Whips, Newcastle United and Celtic. He also appeared in four international matches for Scotland, between 1968 and 1974.

== Aberdeen ==
During his career he played initially for Aberdeen where he was popularly known as "Jinky". He won a Scottish Cup runners up medal in 1967, as Aberdeen lost to Celtic in the final. Aberdeen represented Washington Whips in summer 1967 in the United Soccer Association's inaugural season. In the final, which Washington lost 6–5 to Los Angeles Wolves, Smith was sent off after 30 minutes.

His younger brother Joe also played for Aberdeen, winning a Scottish League Cup winners' medal in November 1976 when Aberdeen beat Celtic 2–0 in the final.

== Newcastle United ==
He transferred from Aberdeen to Newcastle United in July 1969 for a fee of £80,000. He became a popular player amongst the club's supporters with his mazy runs and flair.

Smith experienced a series of knee problems and was sent out on loan to Celtic in the hope it would recover him from the injury problems and allow him to regain form. He failed to do this, however, and was forced to retire at the age of 29.

== Scotland ==
He also won four caps for Scotland. The first was when he was with Aberdeen in a 0–0 draw versus Netherlands in 1968. He then collected three further caps when at Newcastle in a six-month period between November 1973 and May 1974.

He also played once for the Scottish Football League XI.

== Career statistics ==
=== Club ===
Appearances and goals by club, season and competition
Club	Season	League			National Cup		League Cup		Europe		Total	
Club	Season	Division	Apps	Goals	Apps	Goals	Apps	Goals	Apps	Goals	Apps	Goals
Aberdeen	1965–66	Scottish Division One	7	1	0	0	0	0	0	0	7	1
Aberdeen	1966–67	Scottish Division One	30	10	5	4	10	6	0	0	45	20
Aberdeen	1967–68	Scottish Division One	33	9	3	1	3	1	4	2	43	13
Aberdeen	1968–69	Scottish Division One	33	1	6	0	2	1	4	1	45	3
Aberdeen	Total		103	21	14	5	15	8	8	3	140	37
Washington Whips (loan)	1967	United Soccer Association	11	5	0	0	0	0	0	0	11	5
Newcastle United	1969–70	First Division	22	3	0	0	1	0	4	0	27	3
Newcastle United	1970–71	First Division	24	3	2	0	1	0	1	0	28	3
Newcastle United	1971–72	First Division	3	1	0	0	1	0	0	0	4	1
Newcastle United	1972–73	First Division	32	5	2	0	2	0	0	0	36	5
Newcastle United	1973–74	First Division	27	1	8	0	3	0	0	0	38	1
Newcastle United	1974–75	First Division	21	0	2	0	2	0	0	0	25	0
Newcastle United	Total		129	13	14	0	10	0	5	0	158	13
Celtic (loan)	1974–75	Scottish Division One	0	0	0	0	0	0	0	0	0	0
Career total			243	39	28	5	25	8	13	3	309	55

=== International ===
Appearances and goals by national team and year
National team	Year	Apps	Goals
Scotland	1968	1	0
Scotland	1969	—	
Scotland	1970	—	
Scotland	1971	—	
Scotland	1972	—	
Scotland	1973	1	0
Scotland	1974	2	0
Total		4	0

== Honours ==
Newcastle United

- FA Cup runner-up: 1973–74
