= Ian Taylor (footballer, born 1948) =

Scottish footballer

Personal information
- Date of birth: 23 May 1948 (age 78)
- Place of birth: Aberdeen, Scotland
- Position: Left winger

Youth career
- Banks O' Dee

Senior career*
Years	Team	Apps	(Gls)
1966–1974	Aberdeen	109	(23)
1974–1976	Motherwell	48	(5)
1976–1978	St Johnstone	38	(3)
- Elgin City
Total		195	(31)
- * Club domestic league appearances and goals

Ian Taylor (born 23 May 1948) is a Scottish former footballer, who played for Aberdeen, Motherwell and St Johnstone. A left winger, he had a 12-year career in the Scottish Football League, making 195 league appearances.

== Career statistics ==
Appearances and goals by club, season and competition
Club	Season	League			Scottish Cup		League Cup		Europe		Total	
Club	Season	Division	Apps	Goals	Apps	Goals	Apps	Goals	Apps	Goals	Apps	Goals
Aberdeen	1966–67	Scottish Division One	13	3	0	0	0	0	0	0	13	3
Aberdeen	1967–68	Scottish Division One	15	6	0	0	3	0	2	1	20	7
Aberdeen	1968–69	Scottish Division One	14	1	2	0	5	1	3	1	24	3
Aberdeen	1969–70	Scottish Division One	1	0	0	0	0	0	0	0	1	0
Aberdeen	1970–71	Scottish Division One	16	4	4	1	0	0	0	0	20	5
Aberdeen	1971–72	Scottish Division One	15	2	1	0	0	0	2	0	18	2
Aberdeen	1972–73	Scottish Division One	18	4	1	0	10	2	2	0	31	6
Aberdeen	1973–74	Scottish Division One	17	3	1	0	9	0	2	0	29	3
Aberdeen	Total		109	23	9	1	27	3	11	2	156	29
Motherwell	1973-74	Scottish Division One	-	-	-	-	-	-	-	-	-	-
Motherwell	1974-75	Scottish Division One	-	-	-	-	-	-	-	-	-	-
Motherwell	1975-76	Scottish Premier Division	-	-	-	-	-	-	-	-	-	-
Motherwell	Total		48	5	8	2	12	3	0	0	68	10
St Johnstone	1976-77	Scottish First Division	-	-	-	-	-	-	-	-	-	-
St Johnstone	1977-78	Scottish First Division	-	-	-	-	-	-	-	-	-	-
St Johnstone	Total		38	3	-	-	-	-	-	-	38+	3+
Career total			195	31	17+	3+	39+	6+	11	2	262+	42+
