= United Soccer Association =

Professional soccer league

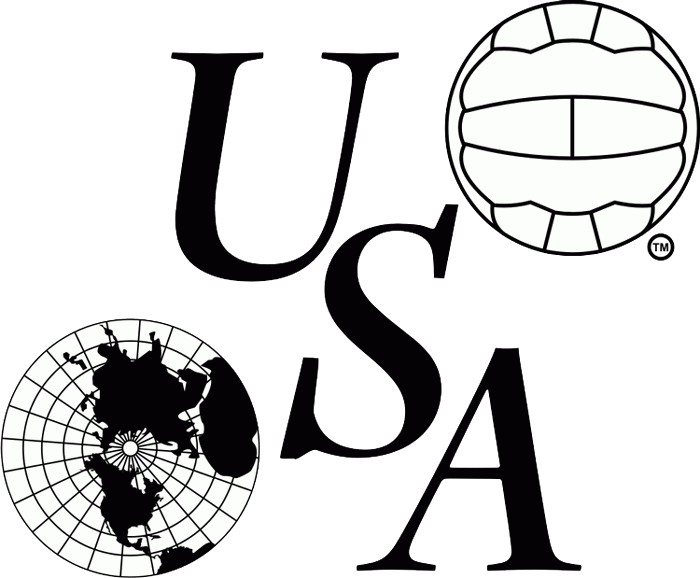
- Founded: 1966; 60 years ago
- Folded: Merged with NPSL to form NASL in 1968
- Country: United States
- Other club from: Canada
- Confederation: CONCACAF
- Number of clubs: 12
- Level on pyramid: 1
- Last champions: Los Angeles Wolves (1967)
- Most championships: Los Angeles Wolves (1)

The United Soccer Association (USA) was a professional soccer league featuring teams based in the United States and Canada. The league survived only one season before merging with the National Professional Soccer League to form the North American Soccer League. Every team in the league was actually an imported European or South American club, that was then outfitted with a "local" name. Dick Walsh served as the commissioner.

== Origins ==
In 1966 a consortium of sports entrepreneurs, led by Jack Kent Cooke and including Lamar Hunt and Steve Stavro, formed the North American Soccer League, with the intention of forming a professional soccer league in North America. This group was subsequently sanctioned by both the USSFA and FIFA. However, a rival consortium known as the National Professional Soccer League also emerged, and to avoid confusion Cooke renamed his consortium the United Soccer Association. The USA originally intended to launch its league in the spring of 1968. However the NPSL, which secured a TV contract from CBS, announced it was ready to launch in 1967. Not wanting to lose ground to its rival, the USA decided to fast track its launch. Without any players of its own, it opted to import whole teams from Europe and South America. It was intended that these teams would represent the franchises during the inaugural season, giving them time to build their own squads for the following season. By May 1967, the USA had garnered applications for franchises wanting to create teams for the next season. An application was made for a team in Miami, to be called the Miami Cobras. A Calgary-based franchise was also in the offing.

== Competing teams ==
Team	Imported clubs	Stadiums	Capac.	Owners
(United States) Boston Rovers	(Republic of Ireland) Shamrock Rovers	Manning Bowl	21,000	Weston Adams (Boston Bruins)
(United States) Chicago Mustangs	(Italy) Cagliari Calcio	Comiskey Park	46,550	Arthur Allyn Jr. (Chicago White Sox)
(United States) Cleveland Stokers	(England) Stoke City	Cleveland Stadium	78,000	Vernon Stouffer, Gabe Paul (Cleveland Indians)
(United States) Dallas Tornado	(Scotland) Dundee United	Cotton Bowl	75,504	Lamar Hunt (Kansas City Chiefs)
(United States) Detroit Cougars	(Northern Ireland) Glentoran	Tiger Stadium	36,000	William Clay Ford (Detroit Lions)
(United States) Houston Stars	(Brazil) Bangu AC	Astrodome	44,500	Judge Roy Hofheinz (Houston Astros)
(United States) Los Angeles Wolves	(England) Wolverhampton Wanderers	Los Angeles Coliseum	93,000	Jack Kent Cooke (Los Angeles Lakers & Kings)
(United States) New York Skyliners	(Uruguay) Cerro	Yankee Stadium	67,000	Madison Square Garden Corporation
(United States) San Francisco Golden Gate Gales	(Netherlands) ADO Den Haag	Kezar Stadium	59,942	George Fleharty (Ice Follies)
(Canada) Toronto City	(Scotland) Hibernian	Varsity Stadium	25,000	Steve Stavro
(Canada) Vancouver Royal Canadians	(England) Sunderland	Empire Stadium	33,000	Brigadier General E.G. Eakins
(United States) Washington Whips	(Scotland) Aberdeen	D.C. Stadium	46,000	Earl Foreman

== Map of clubs ==
Eastern Western

== 1967 season ==
After a series of exhibition games, the USA began playing on May 28 and got off to a good start. The Houston Stars attracted an opening crowd of 34,965. However subsequent attendances did not keep pace and the league finished with an average of 7,890 per game. Of the twelve teams, the Los Angeles Wolves, represented by Wolverhampton Wanderers and featuring Derek Dougan, the Cleveland Stokers, represented by Stoke City and featuring Gordon Banks, and the Washington Whips, represented by Aberdeen, emerged as the strongest sides. Roberto Boninsegna of Chicago Mustangs finished as the league's top scorer with 10 goals.

The USA entered its playoff stage in July 1967. The Western Division champion Los Angeles Wolves, by the flip of a coin, won the right to host the championship game against the Eastern Division champion Washington Whips. The match drew 17,824 to Los Angeles Memorial Coliseum. The Wolves won the championship beating the Whips, 6–5, after 36 minutes of extra-time. The wide-open final featured two hat-tricks, three penalties given (two converted), four goals scored within a four-minute period midway through the second half and each team scoring during (non-golden goal) extra time. The game was finally decided when Whips defender Ally Shewan scored an own goal shortly after the start of golden goal extra time.

== Final standings ==
=== Eastern Division ===
Pos	Team	Pld	W	D	L	GF	GA	GD	Pts	Qualification
1	Washington Whips	12	5	5	2	19	11	+8	15	1967 USA Championship
2	Cleveland Stokers	12	5	4	3	19	13	+6	14	
3	Toronto City	12	4	5	3	23	17	+6	13	
4	Detroit Cougars	12	3	6	3	11	18	−7	12	
5	New York Skyliners	12	2	6	4	15	17	−2	10	
6	Boston Rovers	12	2	3	7	12	26	−14	7	

Source: American Soccer History Archives
Rules for classification: 1) points; 2) goal difference; 3) number of goals scored.
Note: 2 points for a win, 1 point for a tie, 0 points for a loss

=== Western Division ===
Pos	Team	Pld	W	D	L	GF	GA	GD	Pts	Qualification
1	Los Angeles Wolves (C)	12	5	5	2	21	14	+7	15	1967 USA Championship
2	San Francisco Golden Gate Gales	12	5	3	4	25	19	+6	13	
3	Chicago Mustangs	12	3	7	2	20	14	+6	13	
4	Houston Stars	12	4	4	4	19	18	+1	12	
5	Vancouver Royal Canadians	12	3	5	4	20	28	−8	11	
6	Dallas Tornado	12	3	3	6	14	23	−9	9	

Source: American Soccer History Archives
Rules for classification: 1) points; 2) goal difference; 3) number of goals scored.
Note: 2 points for a win, 1 point for a tie, 0 points for a loss
(C) Champions

=== USA Final 1967 ===
July 14, 1967

Los Angeles Wolves	6–5 (a.e.t.)	Washington Whips
Knowles 3'; Burnside 65', 67', 82'; Dougan 113'; Shewan 122' (o.g.)	Report	Smith 21'; Munro 64' (pen.), 89', 120' (pen.); Storrie 66'

Los Angeles Memorial Coliseum, Los Angeles
Attendance: 17,842
Referee: Dick Giebner (USA)

1967 USA Champions: Los Angeles Wolves

== USA All-Stars ==
First Team	Position	Second Team
(Scotland) Bobby Clark, Washington	G	(England) Gordon Banks, Cleveland
(Brazil) Mario Tito, Houston	D	(England) Eric Skeels, Cleveland
(Brazil) Jose Fidelis, Houston	D	(Netherlands) Jan Villerius, San Francisco
(Scotland) Pat Stanton, Toronto	M	(Scotland) Joe Davis, Toronto
(Scotland) Jim Baxter, Vancouver	M	(England) John Moore, Cleveland
(Scotland) Tommy McMillan, Washington	M	(Argentina) Miguel Angelo Longo, Chicago
(Brazil) Ary Clemente, Houston	F	(Scotland) Doug Smith, Dallas
(Brazil) Paulo Borges, Houston	F	(Netherlands) Henk Houwaart, San Francisco
(England) Peter Dobing, Cleveland	F	(Italy) Roberto Boninsegna, Chicago
(England) George Eastham, Cleveland	F	(Brazil) Benedicto Ribeiro, New York
(Wales) Roy Vernon, Cleveland	F	(Scotland) Peter Cormack, Toronto

=== Coach of the year ===
- (England) Ronnie Allen, Los Angeles

== NASL ==
In December 1967 the USA merged with National Professional Soccer League to form the North American Soccer League, taking the original name of the USA group. As a result of the merger several of the original USA franchises folded. This was partly to avoid some cities having two teams. As a result, Toronto City, New York Skyliners and the San Francisco Golden Gate Gales were disbanded in favor of their NPSL rivals, Toronto Falcons, New York Generals and Oakland Clippers. The owners of the Gales franchise subsequently merged with the Vancouver Royal Canadians and the Boston Rovers were relaunched as the Boston Beacons. Together with the Cleveland Stokers, Los Angeles Wolves, Houston Stars, Washington Whips and Dallas Tornado, these teams then became founding members of the NASL. However, after the 1968 season all of these franchises, with the exception of Dallas folded. For their part, the Tornado went on to become NASL champions in 1971 and continued to play in the NASL until 1981, when they merged with the Tampa Bay Rowdies.

The idea of importing teams to represent franchises was revived during the 1969 NASL season. Both Wolverhampton Wanderers and Dundee United returned. This time the former represented Kansas City Spurs and again emerged as champions. The latter linked up once again with Dallas Tornado. Two other English League teams West Ham United and Aston Villa represented Baltimore Bays and Atlanta Chiefs while Kilmarnock of the Scottish Football League played as the St. Louis Stars.

== Attendance ==
Team	GP	Total	High	Low	Average
Houston Stars	6	118,793	34,965	12,380	19,799
Dallas Tornado	6	55,360	20,375	4,916	9,227
New York Skyliners	6	52,596	21,871	3,517	8,766
Washington Whips	7 (Note: One game was replayed, both figures included)	54,597	9,760	5,112	7,800
Los Angeles Wolves	6	46,640	11,572	5,231	7,773
Vancouver Royal Canadians	6	42,113	10,053	5,114	7,019
Toronto City	6	41,538	15,178	3,152	6,923
Cleveland Stokers	6	39,399	9,793	4,516	6,567
Detroit Cougars	6	34,247	11,629	648	5,708
San Francisco Golden Gate Gales	6	32,531	8,177	3,853	5,422
Chicago Mustangs	6	25,239	9,872	2,013	4,207
Boston Rovers	6	25,025	7,343	853	4,171
Total	73	568,078	34,965	648	7,782

Sources: kenn.com
