= Jim Hermiston =

Scottish footballer

Personal information
- Date of birth: 30 September 1947 (age 79)
- Place of birth: Edinburgh, Scotland
- Positions: Defender; midfielder

Senior career*
Years	Team	Apps	(Gls)
1966–1975	Aberdeen	195	(10)
1976	Grange Thistle		
1977	Brisbane City	20	(3)
1978–1981	Brisbane Lions	107	(10)
1982	Brisbane City	19	(1)
Total		341	(24)

International career
1974	Scottish Football League XI	1	(0)

Managerial career
- 1983: Brisbane City
- 1985–1986: Brisbane City
- * Club domestic league appearances and goals

James Hermiston (born 30 September 1947) is a Scottish former professional footballer and police officer. He played for Aberdeen in Scotland and a number of clubs in Australia – he most notably won the 1970 Scottish Cup with Aberdeen, and was inducted into the Aberdeen FC "Hall of Fame" as one of the founding members in 2003. He also served with the police forces in the north of Scotland and Queensland.

== Football career ==
Hermiston began his career as a teenager with Bonnyrigg Rose, and was signed for Aberdeen by Eddie Turnbull in 1965. He made his debut for Aberdeen the following year, and went on to play 270 times for the club in all competitions. He was a member of the 1969–70 Scottish Cup winning team, and was captain of the side toward the end of his time there.

Hermiston played one game for the Scottish League representative side, a 5–0 defeat by the English League team at Maine Road, Manchester on 20 March 1974., but was overlooked for the Scotland squad for the 1974 World Cup. This led him to seek a move to England. However, a proposed transfer to Chelsea failed to materialise, and Hermiston decided to retire from the game at the age of 27 to join Grampian Police as a Police Constable. It is possible that as a PC, his duties may have included policing matches at Aberdeen's ground, Pittodrie Stadium, but it is not clear whether he ever actually did so.

Hermiston and his family emigrated to Australia shortly afterwards, and he resumed his football career there, playing for Grange Thistle, then Brisbane City and Brisbane Lions before returning to police work after a brief spell as manager of Brisbane City.

Hermiston was a popular player in Australia, to the extent of having a children's coaching manual published under his name. He was twice in Philips Cup winning teams, and was even considered as a potential captain of the Australian team. However, this did not come to pass thanks to Hermiston having played part of a game for the Scottish Under-23 side in the early 1970s – the international rules at the time forbidding a player who had represented one country at any level from representing another. In October 1980 Hermiston was voted by the Australian Soccer Press Association player of the year and was handed the award by the Australian Prime Minister Malcolm Fraser.

== Police career ==
After emigrating to Australia, Hermiston joined the Queensland Police, and served with that force until his retirement in 2003. In 1999, he was presented with a bravery award after intervening in a bank robbery while off duty.

== Career statistics ==
=== Club ===
Appearances and goals by club, season and competition
Club	Season	League			Scottish Cup		League Cup		Europe		Total	
Club	Season	Division	Apps	Goals	Apps	Goals	Apps	Goals	Apps	Goals	Apps	Goals
Aberdeen	1966–67	Scottish Division One	4	0	0	0	0	0	0	0	4	0
Aberdeen	1967–68	Scottish Division One	6	0	0	0	0	0	0	0	6	0
Aberdeen	1968–69	Scottish Division One	14	0	0	0	0	0	4	0	18	0
Aberdeen	1969–70	Scottish Division One	26	2	3	0	8	1	0	0	37	3
Aberdeen	1970–71	Scottish Division One	31	1	4	0	6	0	2	0	43	1
Aberdeen	1971–72	Scottish Division One	33	1	3	0	4	0	3	0	43	1
Aberdeen	1972–73	Scottish Division One	33	2	4	0	11	1	2	0	50	3
Aberdeen	1973–74	Scottish Division One	33	1	1	0	10	1	4	1	48	3
Aberdeen	1974–75	Scottish Division One	15	3	0	0	6	2	0	0	21	5
Aberdeen	Total		195	10	15	0	45	5	15	1	270	16
Brisbane City	1977	National Soccer League	20	3	4	0	—		—		24	3
Brisbane Lions	1978	National Soccer League	26	3	2	0	—		—		28	3
Brisbane Lions	1979	National Soccer League	26	2	2	0	—		—		28	2
Brisbane Lions	1980	National Soccer League	26	1	4	0	—		—		30	1
Brisbane Lions	1981	National Soccer League	29	4	5	0	—		—		34	4
Brisbane Lions	Total		107	10	13	0	0	0	0	0	120	10
Brisbane City	1982	National Soccer League	19	1	1	0	—		—		20	1
Career total			341	24	33	0	45	5	15	1	434	30
