= Bobby Reid (footballer, born 1936) =

Scottish footballer

Personal information
- Full name: Robert Bell Alexander Reid
- Date of birth: 18 November 1936
- Place of birth: Dundee, Scotland
- Date of death: 29 July 2000 (aged 63)
- Place of death: Kirkcaldy, Scotland
- Position: Goalkeeper

Senior career*
Years	Team	Apps	(Gls)
–	Lochee Harp		
–	Downfield		
1957–1960	Swansea Town	17	(0)
1960–1963	Arbroath	47	(0)
1963	Dundee United	0	(0)
1963–1973	Raith Rovers	239	(0)
Total		303	(0)
- * Club domestic league appearances and goals

Robert Bell Alexander Reid (18 November 1936 – 29 July 2000) was a Scottish professional footballer who played as a goalkeeper for Lochee Harp, Downfield, Swansea Town, Arbroath, Dundee United and Raith Rovers.
