= Los Angeles Wolves =

Defunct American soccer club

- Full name: Los Angeles Wolves
- Nickname: Wolves
- Founded: 1966
- Dissolved: 1968; 57 years ago
- Stadium: Los Angeles Coliseum; Rose Bowl
- Chairman: Jack Kent Cooke
- Head coach: Ronnie Allen (1967); Ray Wood (1968)
Home colors	Away colors

The Los Angeles Wolves were an American professional soccer team that played for two seasons. In 1967 they played in the United Soccer Association, finishing as champions, and in 1968 they were founding members of the North American Soccer League.

== History ==
=== United Soccer Association ===
In 1966 a group of American and Canadian sports entrepreneurs, led by Jack Kent Cooke, formed the United Soccer Association with the intention of organizing a professional soccer league. The USA originally intended to launch its league in the spring of 1968. However a rival league, the National Professional Soccer League, announced it was ready to launch in 1967. Not wanting to lose ground to its rival, the USA decided to fast track its launch. Without any players of its own, it opted to import whole teams from Europe and South America. It was intended that these teams would represent the franchises during the inaugural season, giving them time to build their own squads for the following season.

Wolverhampton Wanderers, who had won promotion to the English First Division at the end of the 1966–67 season subsequently represented the Los Angeles franchise. Cooke had originally intended to call the team the Los Angeles Zorros, but when the agreement with Wolverhampton Wanderers was made, it was decided to use their nickname of Wolves.

1967 Kit

Wolves played in the Western Division alongside San Francisco Golden Gate Gales, Chicago Mustangs, Houston Stars, Vancouver Royal Canadians and Dallas Tornado. These teams were represented by ADO Den Haag, Cagliari Calcio, Bangu AC, Sunderland and Dundee United. Of the twelve teams in the league, Wolves with a team coached by Ronnie Allen and featuring Derek Dougan, emerged as one of the strongest sides. After winning the Western Division, a flip of a coin gave them the right to host the championship play-off game against the Eastern Division champions, Washington Whips, who were represented by Aberdeen. The match drew 17,824 to Los Angeles Coliseum. Wolves won the championship beating the Whips 6–5 after 36 minutes of extra-time. Four goals were scored within a 4-minute period midway through the second half and each team scored during extra time. The game was decided after Whips defender Ally Shewan scored an own goal.

=== NASL ===
In December 1967 the USA merged with the National Professional Soccer League to form the North American Soccer League (NASL). As a result, Wolves became founding members of the new league. During the inaugural 1968 season Wolves played in the Pacific Division alongside the San Diego Toros, Oakland Clippers and Vancouver Royals. With a team coached by Ray Wood and featuring Carlos Metidieri, but no Wolverhampton Wanderers players, they failed to repeat the success of the previous season. After finishing third in their division, Wolves were one of several NASL franchises that folded after just one season. The idea of importing teams to represent franchises was revived during the 1969 North American Soccer League season and Wolverhampton Wanderers returned to the United States, this time representing Kansas City Spurs, and winning the NASL International Cup.

== Media coverage ==
KTLA covered all Wolves' matches (with home matches on tape delay, often several days) during the inaugural season, with Los Angeles Lakers' announcer Chick Hearn providing commentary. There was no local coverage in the second season.

== Year-by-year ==
Year	League	W	L	T	Pts	Reg. season	Playoffs	Avg. attendance
1967	USA	5	5	2	15	1st, Western Division	Champions	7,777
1968	NASL	11	8	13	139	3rd, Pacific Division	did not qualify	2,441

== Coaches ==
- (England) Ronnie Allen
- (England) Ray Wood

== Players ==
- (England) Mike Bailey (M) (1967)
- (Peru) (United States) Jorge Benitez (F) (1968) 11 apps, 6 goals
- (England) David Burnside (M) (1967) 12 apps, 1 goal
- (England) Danny Campbell (M) (1968) 32 apps, 1 goal
- (Northern Ireland) Derek Dougan (F) (1967) 11 apps, 3 goals
- (England) Alun Evans (F) (1967)
- (England) Graham Hawkins (D) (1967)
- (England) Ernie Hunt (F) (1967) 10 apps, 4 goals
- (England) Tony Knapp (D) (1968) 30 apps, 1 goal
- (England) Peter Knowles (F) (1967) 12 apps, 3 goals
- (Brazil) (United States) Carlos Metidieri (F) (1968) 32 apps, 16 goals
- (England) Phil Parkes (GK) (1967) 7 apps.
- (England) Gerald Taylor (D) (1967)
- (England) Bobby Thomson (D) (1967) 12 apps, 3 goals
- (England) Ray Veall (M) (1968) 31 apps, 4 goals
- (England) David Wagstaffe (M) (1967) 10 apps.
- (England) Terry Wharton (F) (1967) 10 apps.
- (England) (Canada) Les Wilson (D) (1967)
- (England) Ray Wood (GK) (1968)

== Legacy ==
In 2014, the Wolves name was resurrected by a United Premier Soccer League team called the L.A. Wolves FC.

In 2023, the LA Wolves story was brought alive in 1967: When LA Wolves Conquered The USA, a documentary made as a collaboration between Wolverhampton Wanderers and Munidal (part of the FootballCo group). The trailer of the film was released on July 14, 2023, to commemorate 56 years since the final. The final film was released in November 2023 and available on TNT in the UK, across the Discovery network in Europe and on NBC in the USA. It was also made available on the club's official Wolves YouTube channel. The film was subsequently shortlisted for the Kicking & Screening Film festival in New York City in March 2024 and was also a finalist in the 2024 New York Festivals TV & Film awards.

== See also ==
- Los Angeles Toros
- Los Angeles Aztecs
- California Surf
- Los Angeles Salsa
- Los Angeles Skyhawks
- LA Galaxy
- Chivas USA
- L.A. Wolves FC
- Los Angeles FC
