= San Francisco Golden Gate Gales =

Defunct American soccer club

Golden Gate Gales
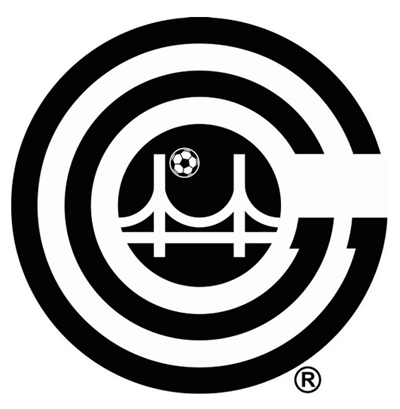
- Full name: San Francisco Golden Gate Gales
- Nickname: Gales
- Founded: 1967
- Dissolved: 1967
- Stadium: Kezar Stadium
- Capacity: 59,000
- Owner: George Fleharty
- Head coach: Ernst Happel, Ferenc Puskás
- League: United Soccer Association
- 1967: 2nd of Western Division
Home colors	Away colors

The San Francisco Golden Gate Gales were an American soccer team that played in the United Soccer Association (USA). The team was based in San Francisco, California and played their home games at the Kezar Stadium. The team folded when the USA merged with the National Professional Soccer League to form the North American Soccer League.

== History ==
In 1966 several groups of entrepreneurs were exploring the idea of forming a professional soccer league in United States. One of these groups, United Soccer Association (USA) led by Jack Kent Cooke, selected 12 cities for team locations and George Fleharty, owner of the Ice Follies, was awarded the San Francisco franchise. The USA originally planned to start play in the spring of 1968; however the rival National Professional Soccer League, which secured a TV contract from CBS, announced it was ready to launch in 1967. Not wanting to let the rival league gain an advantage, the USA decided to launch early. Not having secured any player contracts, the league imported teams from Europe, Brazil, and Uruguay. The Dutch team ADO Den Haag were brought over to represent the city of San Francisco.

The Gales opened the season at home against the Vancouver Royals (Note: The English team Sunderland A.F.C. had been brought over to represent Vancouver) with a 6-1 win in front of crowd of 8,177. The Gales finished the season in second place with a record of 5 wins, 3 ties and 4 losses while drawing an average home league attendance of 5,422.

Following the 1967 season the United Soccer Association teams began to build clubs for the next season. Retired Hungarian soccer player Ferenc Puskás was brought in to coach the Gales and began to assemble and train players. However, in December 1968 the United Soccer Association and the National Professional Soccer League merged to form the North American Soccer League. The Gales closed their franchise to yield to bay region to the Oakland Clippers and the owners bought an interest in the Vancouver Royals.

== Media coverage ==
Due perhaps to competition from the Oakland Clippers, the Gales found it hard to get media coverage. The only record of their being on electric media was two matches on KBRG-FM, comprising opening day (and only the second half at that) and their visit to Los Angeles against the Los Angeles Toros.

== Year-by-year ==
Year	League	W	L	T	Pts	Regular season	Playoffs
1967	USA	5	4	3	13	2nd(t), Western Division	Did not qualify
