= 1969 Scottish League Cup final =

1969 Scottish League Cup final may refer to:

- 1969 Scottish League Cup final (April), final of the 1968–69 Scottish League Cup which was delayed from October 1968 due to a fire at Hampden Park, Hibernian 2–6 Celtic
- 1969 Scottish League Cup final (October), final of the 1969–70 Scottish League Cup, St Johnstone 0–1 Celtic
