= George Adams (footballer, born 1950) =

Scottish footballer and coach

Personal information
- Date of birth: 1 July 1950 (age 76)
- Place of birth: Glasgow, Scotland
- Position: Inside forward

Youth career
- Petershill

Senior career*
| Years | Team | Apps | (Gls) |
| 1969–1973 | Aberdeen | 1 | (0) |
| 1973 | Partick Thistle | 1 | (0) |
| 1973 | Stranraer | 1 | (0) |
| 1973–1974 | Alloa Athletic | 4 | (4) |
| 1974–1976 | East Stirlingshire | 53 | (10) |
- Petershill
| Total | | 60 | (14) |

Managerial career
- 1990–1991: Peterhead
- * Club domestic league appearances and goals

George Adams (born 1 July 1950) is a Scottish football player and coach.

While he was a player, Adams was Alex Ferguson's first signing as a manager, moving to East Stirlingshire from Alloa Athletic in 1974. His playing career was disrupted by injury, and he became a manager in the Highland Football League at a young age.

Adams later worked for Alex Ferguson as a youth coach at Aberdeen. He was later credited by Rangers chairman John McClelland for his role in developing many of the players who achieved great success with Aberdeen during the 1980s. Adams subsequently worked in youth development for Celtic and Motherwell.

Adams left Motherwell in 2003 to become director of youth football at Rangers. He left Rangers in September 2005 after being offered a different post as part of a restructuring exercise at the club. Adams blamed a personality clash with chief executive Martin Bain as the reason for his departure.

Later in 2005, Adams joined Ross County as director of football. In 2007, Adams appointed his son (Derek Adams) as Ross County manager. The father and son pairing guided Ross County to the 2010 Scottish Cup final, recording upset victories over Hibernian and Celtic en route. The pairing were split when Adams left Ross County to become assistant manager to Colin Calderwood at Hibernian, but were reunited again when Derek Adams returned as Ross County manager in 2011. Both father and son were sacked by Ross County in August 2014.

== Personal life ==
Adams was Sir Alex Ferguson first signing as a Manager. He has a son and daughter called Derek and Leigh-Anne.
