= Willie Watt (footballer, born 1946) =

Scottish footballer

Personal information
- Full name: William Douglas Watt
- Date of birth: 6 June 1946 (age 80)
- Place of birth: Aberdeen, Scotland
- Position: Left winger

Youth career
- Preston North End

Senior career*
Years	Team	Apps	(Gls)
1963–1966	Preston North End	8	(0)
1966–1969	Aberdeen	17	(8)
1967	→ Washington Whips (loan)		
1969–1970	Raith Rovers	13	(0)
- Ross County
Total		38	(8)
- * Club domestic league appearances and goals

William Douglas Watt (born 6 June 1946) is a Scottish former professional footballer who played as a left winger.

== Career ==
Born in Aberdeen, Watt played for Preston North End, Aberdeen, Washington Whips, Raith Rovers and Ross County.
