= George Buchan =

Scottish footballer

Personal information
- Full name: George Buchan
- Date of birth: 2 May 1950 (age 76)
- Place of birth: Aberdeen, Scotland
- Position: Right winger

Youth career
- Banks O' Dee

Senior career*
Years	Team	Apps	(Gls)
- Banks O' Dee
1968–1973	Aberdeen	29	(2)
1973–1974	Manchester United	3	(0)
1974–1976	Bury	65	(6)
1976–1977	Mossley	?	(?)
Total		97	(8)
- * Club domestic league appearances and goals

George Buchan (born 2 May 1950) is a Scottish former footballer. Born in Aberdeen, his regular position was as a forward. He played professionally for Aberdeen, Manchester United and Bury. While at Manchester United, he played briefly alongside his brother, Martin. Buchan later played non-League football in North West England, listing Mossley, Ashton United and Glossop among his clubs.

== Career statistics ==
Club	Season	League		FA Cup		League Cup		Other		Total	
Club	Season	Apps	Goals	Apps	Goals	Apps	Goals	Apps	Goals	Apps	Goals
Manchester United	1973–74	3	0	0	0	1	0	0	0	4	0
Manchester United	Total	3	0	0	0	1	0	0	0	4	0
