= Tommy Rae =

Scottish footballer

Personal information
- Full name: Thomas Rae
- Date of birth: 17 June 1881
- Place of birth: Kilwinning, Scotland
- Date of death: 1957 (aged 75–76)
- Position: Wing half

Senior career*
| Years | Team | Apps | (Gls) |
| 1901–1904 | Kilwinning Rangers | | |
| 1904–1907 | Morton | 54 | (3) |
| 1907–1913 | Bury | 72 | (1) |
| 1911–1912 | → St Mirren (loan) | 3 | (0) |
| 1913 | Stevenston United | | |
| Total | | 129 | (4) |
- * Club domestic league appearances and goals

Thomas Rae (17 June 1881 – 1957) was a Scottish footballer who played in the Football League for Bury.
