= David Burnside (footballer) =

English footballer and manager

Personal information
- Full name: David Gort Burnside
- Date of birth: 10 December 1939
- Place of birth: Kingswood, England
- Date of death: 17 October 2009 (aged 69)
- Place of death: Bristol, England
- Height: 5 ft 10 in (1.78 m)
- Position: Attacking midfielder

Youth career
- 1955: Bristol City
- 1955–1957: West Bromwich Albion

Senior career*
Years	Team	Apps	(Gls)
1957–1962	West Bromwich Albion	127	(39)
1962–1964	Southampton	61	(22)
1964–1966	Crystal Palace	58	(8)
1966–1968	Wolverhampton Wanderers	40	(5)
1967	→ Los Angeles Wolves (guest)	12	(1)
1968–1971	Plymouth Argyle	105	(15)
1971–1972	Bristol City	1	(0)
1972	Colchester United	13	(0)
1972–1973	Bath City	37	(0)

International career
1961	England U-23	2	(0)

Managerial career
- 1972–1973: Bath City (Player-manager)
- 1993: England U-20
- 2000: Bristol City (Joint caretaker-manager)
- * Club domestic league appearances and goals

David Gort Burnside (10 December 1939 – 17 October 2009) was an English footballer, who played as an attacking midfielder. He made a total of 405 appearances in the Football League for West Bromwich Albion, Southampton, Crystal Palace, Wolverhampton Wanderers, Plymouth Argyle, Bristol City and Colcester United. He then moved into non-League football becoming player-manager at Bath City and later became a youth trainer with England and briefly manager at Bristol City. He also made appearances for Los Angeles Wolves as a guest.

== Playing career ==
=== Early days ===
Burnside was born in Kingswood, near Bristol and attended Kingswood School and represented Bristol & District Schools, before joining Bristol City as a trainee in July 1955. His father was so keen to see David develop his football skills that he installed floodlights in his back garden to enable his son to practice in the evenings.

=== West Bromwich Albion ===
His potential was quickly spotted by First Division West Bromwich Albion to whom he moved in December 1955, signing professional papers in February 1957. He soon acquired nationwide fame for his incredible ball-juggling abilities when, in October 1957, during the half-time in a televised friendly match against Russian team CDSA Moscow he performed his tricks to entertain the crowd. In 1960, he entered a heading competition organised by the Sunday Dispatch newspaper. He managed 495 clean headers without a break and although this was far from a record it amply demonstrated his ball skills.

During his time at The Hawthorns, West Bromwich were relatively successful, generally ending the season in the upper half of the First Division table, including reaching fourth spot in 1959–60. Burnside made 135 appearances for West Bromwich and represented England at Youth level as well as winning two under-23 caps.

=== Southampton ===
In September 1962, Ted Bates signed him for Second Division Southampton for a fee of £18,000, making him Bates's third signing in 10 days (along with George Kirby and Stuart Williams). Burnside immediately became a fixture in the Saints side, alongside Terry Paine and John Sydenham on the wings and Kirby and George O'Brien in attack. He was adept at finding space with well-timed runs, and his passing skills were terrific.

In the 1962–63 season Saints fielded the same line-up in 28 matches including all seven FA Cup matches as Saints progressed to the semi-final, going out 1–0 at Villa Park to eventual winners Manchester United, after an epic three match battle to get past Nottingham Forest in the previous round. In the first quarter-final replay against Forest, Burnside scored an 89th-minute equaliser as Saints came back from a three-goal deficit. In the second replay, at White Hart Lane he scored twice, including a rocket shot for the third goal as Saints finally defeated Forest 5–0.

The cup run was not matched in the league, however, as Saints finished the 1962–63 season in eleventh place, although Burnside was the second highest scorer (behind O'Brien) with 14 goals.

Despite a 6–1 victory over Charlton Athletic in the opening game of the 1963–64 season, Saints had dropped to the lower half of the table by mid-September. In the second victory of the season (2–0 over Newcastle United on 18 September) Burnside injured his knee and was out until mid-January, losing his place to John McGuigan. Although Burnside returned for a run of six games from mid-January to mid-February, including scoring in the 7–2 victory over Scunthorpe United on 29 January 1964, he was forced to sit out the remainder of the season, until the postponed final game of the season at home to Rotherham United in which he returned to score in a 6–1 victory (thereby helping Saints notch up 100 league goals for the season), with Saints finishing in fifth place.

The following season, Burnside regained his place until he was surprisingly sold to Crystal Palace in December 1964 for £12,000. The proceeds went to partly fund the purchase of Jimmy Melia, who was to lead the Saints to the First Division a year and a half later. In his two years at The Dell Burnside made a total of 70 appearances, scoring 26 goals.

=== Crystal Palace and Wolves ===
Burnside signed for Crystal Palace, then in their first season after promotion to Division Two, on 24 December 1964. He spent one and a half seasons with Palace in Division Two, (58 appearances, 8 goals) before joining Wolverhampton Wanderers on 7 September 1966, helping them to promotion to Division One (as runners-up) at the end of the 1966–67 season. He remained with Wolves until March 1968, when he moved back to Division Two with Plymouth Argyle. Whilst at Wolverhampton Wanderers, Burnside also made appearances, as a guest, for Los Angeles Wolves, essentially the Wolverhampton club, playing in the short-lived United Soccer Association league.

=== Plymouth Argyle ===
In March 1968, a fee of £7,000 took the experienced 28-year-old to Home Park as one of new manager Billy Bingham's first purchases for the Pilgrims.

Neither Bingham nor Burnside, who made his debut in a 2–0 Second Division win at Hull City, arrived in time to save Argyle from relegation to the Third Division at the end of the 1967–68 season. Burnside played in the last 12 games of the campaign.

The following term, however, saw Burnside prove his worth as a player. After excelling as both inside-forward and deep-lying centre-forward, he was voted "Player of the Year" by Home Park fans in the 1968–69 campaign, in which he scored nine goals in 42 Third Division games.

With Ellis Stuttard replacing Bingham in the manager's office, Burnside was used more sparingly in the 1969–70 season (15 League games, one goal) but he was a regular once more in 1970–71, mostly as a midfielder. He managed five goals in his 36 Third Division appearances.

Burnside was an important member of the Argyle squad as the Pilgrims drifted along in the middle of the Third Division, but it is probable that he would have been even more effective if he did not have to cope with a daily commute from his Bristol home.

Burnside's last senior game for the Pilgrims was in May 1971 at Millmoor, where he scored in a 1–1 Third Division draw with Rotherham United. The following season, he found himself stuck in the reserves, however, and in December 1971 he was transferred to his home-town club Bristol City. His final Argyle tally was 105 League games and 15 goals.

== Later career ==
Burnside played just one League game for the Ashton Gate club, though, before going to Colchester United, his last League club in March 1972. In May 1972, he moved back to his home in Bristol and became player-manager of Southern League side Bath City, where he stayed until the following summer. There followed spells at various clubs including coaching at Walsall and playing/coaching with Minehead, Bridgwater Town and Taunton Town.

In October 1979, he started working for the Football Association as a regional coach in the West country, before becoming part of the international set-up in 1983, having known England manager Bobby Robson since his time at The Hawthorns. He worked as the England Youth manager until January 1997 when he rejoined Bristol City as Director of Youth Football. In January 2000, he took on the role of caretaker manager after the departure of Tony Pulis, jointly with Tony Fawthrop. In their short time as caretaker managers, Fawthrop and Burnside guided the Robins to a Wembley appearance in the Football League Trophy Final, losing 2–1 to Stoke City.

After handing the manager's post to Leroy Rosenior in summer 2000, Burnside continued to assist Bristol City as technical advisor, before a spell working with Bobby Gould as football co-ordinator at Cheltenham Town, which ended in October 2003.

Burnside died on 17 October 2009 after suffering a heart attack aged 69. Shortly before his death, he had been adopted to contest a Bristol seat for the United Kingdom Independence Party (UKIP) in the 2010 general election.

== Honours ==
=== As a player ===
Wolverhampton Wanderers

- Football League Second Division runner-up: 1966–67

=== As a manager ===
Bristol City

- Football League Trophy runner-up: 1999–2000
