= Dave Millar =

Scottish footballer

Personal information
- Full name: David Allan Millar
- Date of birth: 1 March 1945 (age 81)
- Place of birth: Gourock, Scotland
- Position: Inside forward

Senior career*
Years	Team	Apps	(Gls)
1963–1965	Queen's Park	70	(13)
1965–1968	Aberdeen	17	(0)
1968–1970	Raith Rovers	74	(4)
1970–1974	St Mirren	92	(5)
1974	Stranraer	18	(2)

International career
1963–1965	Scotland Amateurs	9	(1)
- * Club domestic league appearances and goals

David Allan Millar (born 1 March 1945) was a Scottish professional footballer who played as an inside forward in the Scottish League for St Mirren, Raith Rovers, Queen's Park, Stranraer and Aberdeen. He was capped by Scotland at amateur level.
