= Jens Petersen =

Danish footballer (1941–2012)

Personal information
- Date of birth: 22 December 1941
- Place of birth: Esbjerg, Denmark
- Date of death: 8 March 2012 (aged 70)
- Place of death: Esbjerg, Denmark
- Position: Defender

Senior career*
Years	Team	Apps	(Gls)
1960–1964	Esbjerg fB	147	(7)
1964–1970	Aberdeen	141	(7)
1970–1971	Rapid Wien	11	(0)
1971–1973	Racing Mechelen		
1973–1975	Varde IF		

International career
1962–1965	Denmark	22	(1)

Managerial career
- Varde IF
- Esbjerg fB
- Tarp Boldklub
- * Club domestic league appearances and goals

Jens Petersen (22 December 1941 – 8 March 2012) was a Danish football player and manager. He was born in Esbjerg. During his playing career he played as a defender for Esbjerg fB and Varde IF in Denmark, Aberdeen in Scotland, Rapid Wien in Austria, and Racing Mechelen in Belgium.

He earned a total of 22 caps for the Danish national side, but his international career was ended when he turned professional and joined Aberdeen. After retiring as a player in 1975, he managed Varde IF and Esbjerg fB.

He died on 8 March 2012, aged 70.

== Career statistics ==
Appearances and goals by club, season and competition
Club	Season	League			Scottish Cup		League Cup		Europe		Total	
Club	Season	Division	Apps	Goals	Apps	Goals	Apps	Goals	Apps	Goals	Apps	Goals
Aberdeen	1964-65	Scottish Division One	3	0	1	0	0	0	0	0	4	0
Aberdeen	1965-66	Scottish Division One	23	0	5	1	1	0	0	0	29	1
Aberdeen	1966-67	Scottish Division One	30	1	6	0	10	1	0	0	46	2
Aberdeen	1967-68	Scottish Division One	32	3	2	0	6	0	3	1	43	4
Aberdeen	1968-69	Scottish Division One	34	1	6	0	6	0	4	0	50	1
Aberdeen	1969-70	Scottish Division One	19	2	2	0	8	0	0	0	29	2
Aberdeen	Total		141	7	22	1	31	1	7	1	201	10
