= Davie Johnston (footballer, born 1942) =

Scottish footballer

Davy Johnston
Personal information
- Full name: David Ross Johnston
- Date of birth: 28 November 1942
- Place of birth: Nairn, Scotland
- Date of death: 7 April 2004 (aged 63)
- Place of death: Inverness, Scotland
- Height: 5 ft 8 in (1.73 m)
- Position: Forward

Youth career
- Nairn County

Senior career*
Years	Team	Apps	(Gls)
1960–1961	Heart of Midlothian	5	(1)
1961–1966	Nairn County	266	(284)
1966–1969	Aberdeen	98	(39)
1969–1975	Caledonian	188	(156)
1975–1976	Nairn County	13	(2)
Total		570	(482)
- * Club domestic league appearances and goals

David Ross "Davy" Johnston (1942 – 2004) was a Scottish footballer, who played as a forward for Nairn County FC and Caledonian FC of the Scottish Highland Football League, and Heart of Midlothian FC and Aberdeen FC of the Scottish Football League.

Johnston began his senior football career as a 16 year old with his home town club, Nairn County FC. of the Scottish Highland Football League. He transferred to Heart of Midlothian FC of the Scottish Football League at 18 years of age and was very quickly in the Hearts first team playing at the top level of Scottish football. Due to homesickness Johnson returned to Nairn one year later and spent the next five years in Highland League football with Nairn County before transferring back into the Scottish League top tier of football with Aberdeen FC where he had a successful three years before once again returning to the Highland League, this time with Inverness team Caledonian FC, and finally finishing his senior football career at his first senior club, Nairn County FC.

Johnston was the subject of a 2010 book 'Pittodrie's Silent Assassin - Davy Johnston: Aberdeen, Nairn and Caley Sharpshooter' by journalist and lifelong Nairn County supporter Donald Wilson.

== Career statistics ==
=== Appearances and goals by club, season and competition ===
Club	Season	League			Scottish Cup		League Cup		Europe		Total	
Club	Season	Division	Apps	Goals	Apps	Goals	Apps	Goals	Apps	Goals	Apps	Goals
Heart of Midlothian	1960-61	Scottish Division One	5	1	0	0	0	0	0	0	5	1
Aberdeen	1966-67	Scottish Division One	20	10	6	4	0	0	0	0	26	14
Aberdeen	1967-68	Scottish Division One	28	16	3	0	4	0	1	0	36	16
Aberdeen	1968-69	Scottish Division One	27	8	6	1	2	0	1	0	36	9
Aberdeen	Total		75	34	15	5	6	0	2	0	98	39
Career total			80	35	15	5	6	0	2	0	103	40
