= Tommy Craig =

Scottish football player and manager (born 1950)

Personal information
- Full name: Thomas Brooks Craig
- Date of birth: 21 November 1950 (age 75)
- Place of birth: Glasgow, Scotland
- Position: Midfielder

Senior career*
Years	Team	Apps	(Gls)
1967–1968	Aberdeen	45	(8)
1968–1974	Sheffield Wednesday	214	(38)
1974–1977	Newcastle United	124	(22)
1977–1979	Aston Villa	27	(2)
1979–1981	Swansea City	52	(9)
1981–1984	Carlisle United	98	(10)
1984–1985	Hibernian	11	(0)
Total		571	(89)

International career
1976	Scotland	1	(0)

Managerial career
- 1993–1998: Scotland U21
- 2009–2010: Charleroi
- 2014: St Mirren
- * Club domestic league appearances and goals

Thomas Brooks Craig (born 21 November 1950) is a Scottish former football player and coach. Craig had an 18-year playing career as a midfielder, playing over 100 league games for English clubs Sheffield Wednesday and Newcastle United. Towards the end of his playing career he became a coach, and he has worked for clubs including Hibernian, Celtic, Aberdeen, Newcastle and St Mirren.

== Playing career ==
Craig was born in Glasgow. A midfielder, he started his playing career at Aberdeen. In 1969 Sheffield Wednesday paid £100,000 for his services, a club record transfer fee at the time, as well as a British record for a teenager. Craig scored 37 league goals for Wednesday, including many from the penalty spot. During his time at the club, Wednesday were relegated from the top flight following Craig's first full season, and they continued to struggle in Division Two, finally being relegated again shortly after he left for Newcastle United in 1974. While at the club, Craig was the fan favourite and was described as "an adopted Geordie".

After leaving Newcastle he went on to join Ron Saunders' Aston Villa, however, his stay was short lived as Saunders was clearing the decks in order to turn Villa into the Championship and European Cup winning force of the early 1980s. He subsequently moved on to Swansea City, Carlisle United and Hibernian before becoming a coach.

Craig was capped once by Scotland, against Switzerland in 1976.

== Coaching career ==
After retiring as a player, Craig was made assistant manager to John Blackley at Hibernian, before briefly taking over as caretaker manager upon Blackley's departure. He was then Billy McNeill's assistant manager at Celtic, where they won the championship in their centenary year. A spell at Aberdeen as assistant to Roy Aitken followed, before he took up the coaching role of Scotland's Under-21 team.

Craig spent time as a first team coach of Newcastle United, until he was released in September 2006. While at Newcastle United, Craig stated he learned coaching development under the first team managers during his seven years as a coach. He was then chosen by John Collins to be his assistant at Hibernian. Following Collins' resignation, Craig acted as the caretaker manager of Hibernian for the second time. He left the club after four games, following the appointment of Mixu Paatelainen as manager. Craig joined Charleroi as assistant coach to Collins in December 2008. On 20 November 2009, he was appointed as head coach on a one-and-a-half-year contract. Despite this contract, Craig was sacked on 14 April 2010.

St Mirren manager Danny Lennon appointed Craig as first team coach on 22 July 2011. Craig was part of the coaching team that won the 2012–13 Scottish League Cup with St Mirren. On 13 May 2014 Craig was appointed as St Mirren manager, following the departure of Lennon. Immediately after taking the job, Craig included two players on his coaching team, Jim Goodwin and Gary Teale. Craig was sacked in December 2014, after 19 matches in charge. St Mirren were joint bottom of the Scottish Premiership and lost 4–0 to Inverness in the Scottish Cup.

=== Managerial statistics ===
As of 9 December 2014.

Team	Nat	From	To	Record				
Team	Nat	From	To	G	W	D	L	Win %
Scotland U21	(Scotland)	1993	1998					
Charleroi	(Belgium)	2009	2010	19	2	3	14	10.53
St Mirren	(Scotland)	2014	2014	19	3	3	13	15.79

- No statistics currently available for Scotland U21 team.

== Honours ==
Newcastle United

- Football League Cup runner-up: 1975–76
