= Harry Melrose =

Scottish footballer (1935–2024)

Personal information
- Date of birth: 31 May 1935
- Place of birth: Edinburgh, Scotland
- Date of death: 22 February 2024 (aged 88)
- Position: Winger

Youth career
- Dalkeith Thistle

Senior career*
Years	Team	Apps	(Gls)
1956–1958	Rangers	0	(0)
1958–1965	Dunfermline Athletic	179	(73)
1965–1969	Aberdeen	63	(13)
1969–1975	Berwick Rangers	98	(14)
Total		340	(100)

Managerial career
- 1969–1975: Berwick Rangers
- 1975–1980: Dunfermline Athletic
- * Club domestic league appearances and goals

Harry Melrose (31 May 1935 – 22 February 2024) was a Scottish professional football player and manager.

== Club career ==
A winger, Melrose started his playing career for Rangers. His only appearance for the Gers was in the Scottish League Cup semi-final in September 1957, scoring twice in a 4–0 win over Brechin City.

Melrose made his name at Dunfermline Athletic after arriving on a free transfer in May 1958. A stalwart of Jock Stein's side of the early 1960s, he made 271 appearances and scored 106 goals, including 6 goals, (a joint club record shared with Charlie Dickson) in a game against Partick Thistle in April 1959.

He left East End Park in October 1965 and signed for Aberdeen for a fee of £10,000. He was captain of the Dons from 1966 to 1968.

== Managerial career ==
In 1969, Melrose left Pittodrie and became player-manager of Berwick Rangers. In 1975, he returned to Dunfermline as manager and guided them to promotion to Scottish League Division One in May 1979.

== Death ==
Harry Melrose died on 22 February 2024, at the age of 88.

== Career statistics ==
=== Player ===
Appearances and goals by club, season and competition
Club	Seasons	League			Scottish Cup		League Cup		Europe		Total	
Club	Seasons	Division	Apps	Goals	Apps	Goals	Apps	Goals	Apps	Goals	Apps	Goals
Rangers	1957–58	Scottish Division One	0	0	0	0	1	2	0	0	1	2
Dunfermline Athletic	1958–59	Scottish Division One	33	21	5	2	7	5	0	0	45	28
Dunfermline Athletic	1959–60	Scottish Division One	31	7	3	0	6	2	0	0	40	9
Dunfermline Athletic	1960–61	Scottish Division One	27	13	7	3	6	0	0	0	40	16
Dunfermline Athletic	1961–62	Scottish Division One	34	16	5	5	6	0	6	2	51	23
Dunfermline Athletic	1962–63	Scottish Division One	26	2	2	1	6	4	5	1	39	8
Dunfermline Athletic	1963–64	Scottish Division One	10	2	0	0	3	0	0	0	13	2
Dunfermline Athletic	1964–65	Scottish Division One	18	12	4	2	6	2	4	0	32	16
Dunfermline Athletic	Total		179	73	26	13	40	13	15	3	260	102
Aberdeen	1965–66	Scottish Division One	28	6	5	2	0	0	0	0	33	8
Aberdeen	1966–67	Scottish Division One	27	5	6	1	10	2	0	0	43	8
Aberdeen	1967–68	Scottish Division One	8	2	0	0	1	0	2	1	11	3
Aberdeen	Total		63	13	11	3	11	2	2	1	87	19
Career total			242	86	37	16	52	17	17	4	348	123

=== Managerial record ===
Team	From	To	Record				
Team	From	To	P	W	L	D	Win %
Berwick Rangers	1969	1975	281	102	120	59	36.30%
Dunfermline Athletic	20 September 1975	9 December 1980	241	90	78	73	37.34%
Career total			522	192	198	132	36.82%
