= Tommy McMillan (footballer, born 1944) =

Scottish footballer (1944–2026)

Personal information
- Date of birth: 26 June 1944
- Place of birth: Paisley, Scotland
- Date of death: 5 February 2026 (aged 81)
- Place of death: Aberdeen, Scotland
- Position: Central defender

Youth career
- Johnstone Burgh
- Neilston Juniors

Senior career*
Years	Team	Apps	(Gls)
1965–1972	Aberdeen	173	(1)
1972–1973	Falkirk	32	(0)
- Inverness Thistle
Total		205	(1)

International career
1966–1967	Scotland U23	2	(0)

Managerial career
- Inverness Thistle
- * Club domestic league appearances and goals

Thomas McMillan (26 June 1944 – 5 February 2026) was a Scottish professional footballer who played as a central defender for Aberdeen and Falkirk.

== Biography ==
McMillan was born in Paisley and played as a youngster at Johnstone Burgh and Neilston Juniors. He signed for Aberdeen in 1965. While playing for Aberdeen, he won a Scottish Cup winners' medal in 1970. He moved to Falkirk in 1972, before eventually taking on a player-manager role with Inverness Thistle, and later managing Fraserburgh.

He later became a taxi driver in Aberdeen. McMillan died on 5 February 2026, at the age of 81.

== Career statistics ==
=== Club ===
Appearances and goals by club, season and competition
Club	Season	League			Scottish Cup		League Cup		Europe		Total	
Club	Season	Division	Apps	Goals	Apps	Goals	Apps	Goals	Apps	Goals	Apps	Goals
Aberdeen	1965–66	Scottish Division One	32	0	5	0	4	0	0	0	41	0
Aberdeen	1966–67	Scottish Division One	32	0	6	0	10	0	0	0	48	0
Aberdeen	1967–68	Scottish Division One	33	0	3	0	6	0	4	1	46	1
Aberdeen	1968–69	Scottish Division One	16	0	0	0	6	0	4	0	26	0
Aberdeen	1969–70	Scottish Division One	24	0	5	0	8	0	0	0	37	0
Aberdeen	1970–71	Scottish Division One	27	1	4	0	6	0	0	0	37	1
Aberdeen	1971–72	Scottish Division One	8	0	0	0	5	0	0	0	13	0
Aberdeen	1972–73	Scottish Division One	0	0	0	0	0	0	0	0	0	0
Aberdeen	Total		172	1	23	0	45	0	8	1	248	2
Falkirk	1972–73	Scottish Division One	32	0	2	0	8	0	0	0	42	0
Career total			204	1	25	0	53	0	8	1	290	2

== Honours ==
Aberdeen

- Scottish Cup: 1970
