= Frank Munro =

Scottish footballer (1947–2011)

Personal information
- Full name: Francis Michael Munro
- Date of birth: 25 October 1947
- Place of birth: Broughty Ferry, Dundee, Scotland
- Date of death: 16 August 2011 (aged 63)
- Place of death: Wolverhampton, England
- Position: Centre back

Senior career*
Years	Team	Apps	(Gls)
1964–1966	Dundee United	50	(14)
1966–1968	Aberdeen	43	(8)
1968–1977	Wolverhampton Wanderers	296	(14)
1977–1978	Celtic	15	(0)
1978–1979	South Melbourne Hellas	17	(0)
1979–1983	Albion Rovers SC	0	(0)
Total		421	(36)

International career
1971–1975	Scotland	9	(0)
1969–1971	Scotland U23	4	(0)
- * Club domestic league appearances and goals

Francis Michael Munro (25 October 1947 – 16 August 2011) was a Scottish international footballer who played as a centre back.

Munro played for Dundee United and Aberdeen in his native Scotland before moving to Wolverhampton Wanderers in 1968. Here he won a League Cup winners medal while with the club, and played in the first-ever UEFA Cup Final.

He was posthumously inducted into the Wolverhampton Wanderers Hall of Fame in 2017.

== Career ==
=== Early ===
Munro started his career as a centre-forward with Chelsea at junior and amateur level in 1961–62, after leaving school, but he left without signing professional forms. Following this, he returned home to his native Scotland and signed as a professional for Dundee United. He broke into the first team in 1964 and won four Scotland youth caps during his time at Tannadice.

In October 1966, he moved to fellow Division 1 outfit Aberdeen for £10,000. His first season proved a success as he collected a runners-up medal as the team fought its way through to the 1967 Scottish Cup Final, losing 0–2 to Celtic at Hampden Park. This was sufficient to qualify for Europe though, and they competed in the Cup Winners' Cup the following season, giving Munro his first – but not last – taste of European football. Munro scored Aberdeen's first goal in European competition, in a 10–1 win against KR Reykjavik.

In the summer of 1967, Munro and Aberdeen travelled to America to compete in the newly formed United Soccer Association league. Due to the lack of existing teams, the league organisers instead imported several established teams from around the globe to compete under 'franchise' names. Aberdeen competed as the "Washington Whips", based in the capital. The Whips won the Eastern division and so progressed through to the championship play-off match in July, where they faced the Western champions, Los Angeles Wolves (represented by Wolverhampton Wanderers). The Whips eventually lost 5–6 in extra time, but Munro's performance in scoring a hat-trick, caught the eye of the opposition manager Ronnie Allen.

=== Wolverhampton Wanderers ===
In October 1968, Wolves acted upon this display and signed Munro for £55,000. Munro went on to play 371 times in total for the club, becoming firmly established at centre back, despite signing as a midfielder. He also chipped in with 18 goals in total, including scoring in both legs of the 1972 UEFA Cup semi final defeat of Ferencváros and played in the final, collecting another runners-up medal after a 2–3 aggregate defeat to Spurs.

Munro didn't have to wait too long though for a winners' medal as Wolves lifted the 1974 League Cup, after a 2–1 victory over Manchester City at Wembley. The Wolves also won the Texaco Cup in 1971.

His performances for Wolves also won him nine Scotland caps – as well as four at under-23 level – spread from 1971 to 1975, his full debut coming on 18 May 1971 against Northern Ireland. His last appearance for Scotland was in a 1–1 draw against Romania in Bucharest.

Shortly after helping the Midlanders to regain their First Division status in 1976–77 – after a year outside it – Munro returned to Scotland when the lure of Celtic proved too strong. He signed after a short loan period in December 1977 for £20,000. Munro was the last player Jock Stein signed as Celtic manager.

=== Later life ===
Stein saw Munro as being a replacement for the injured Pat Stanton. His time in Glasgow was to prove short-lived, however. Despite picking up another runners-up medal (in the 1978 Scottish League Cup), Celtic only finished fifth in the Scottish Premier Division. Munro was released by Celtic in the summer of 1978 and he headed for a new challenge in Australia by signing for South Melbourne Hellas, managed by former Wolves goalkeeper Dave MacLaren. Although initially this was only planned as a short-term arrangement, he ended up moving there permanently.

During the 1980s Munro took up a player/coach role at Albion Rovers (Victoria, Australia), before retiring as a player. He later managed Hamlyn Rangers (now known as Geelong Rangers F.C.) and Keilor Park (formerly Keilor Austria). He returned to the UK in 1991 and settled in Wolverhampton, with his partner Naomi. He suffered a stroke in the early 2000s and began using a wheelchair. He died on 16 August 2011 after suffering acute breathing difficulties.

== Honours ==
Aberdeen

- Scottish Cup runner-up: 1966–67

Wolverhampton Wanderers

- Football League Second Division: 1976–77
- Football League Cup: 1973–74
- UEFA Cup runner-up: 1971–72

Celtic

- Scottish League Cup runner-up: 1977–78
