= Jimmy Wilson (footballer, born 1942) =

Scottish footballer and manager

Personal information
- Date of birth: 20 April 1942 (age 84)
- Place of birth: Newmains, Scotland
- Position: Left winger

Youth career
- Shotts Bon Accord

Senior career*
Years	Team	Apps	(Gls)
1960–1962	Newcastle United	12	(2)
1962–1965	Morton	86	(37)
1965–1968	Aberdeen	75	(24)
1968–1971	Motherwell	83	(11)
1971–1974	Dundee	90	(8)
1974–1976	Falkirk	28	(4)
- Elgin City
Total		374	(86)

International career
1967	Scottish League XI	1	(0)

Managerial career
- Elgin City
- 1996: Cove Rangers
- * Club domestic league appearances and goals

Jimmy Wilson (born 20 April 1942 in Newmains) is a Scottish former football player and manager, who played for Newcastle United, Morton, Aberdeen, Motherwell, Dundee and Falkirk. Wilson also represented the Scottish League once, in 1967. He later became player–manager of Elgin City, while they were a Highland Football League club.

== Career statistics ==
Appearances and goals by club, season and competition
Club	Season	League			National Cup		League Cup		Europe		Total	
Club	Season	Division	Apps	Goals	Apps	Goals	Apps	Goals	Apps	Goals	Apps	Goals
Newcastle United	1960-61	First Division	2	0	0	0	1	0	0	0	3	0
Newcastle United	1961-62	Second Division	10	2	0	0	0	0	-	-	10	2
Newcastle United	Total		12	2	0	0	1	0	0	0	13	2
Greenock Morton	1961-62	Scottish Second Division	-	-	-	-	-	-	-	-	-	-
Greenock Morton	1962-63	Scottish Second Division	-	-	-	-	-	-	-	-	-	-
Greenock Morton	1963-64	Scottish Second Division	-	-	-	-	-	-	-	-	-	-
Greenock Morton	1964-65	Scottish Division One	-	-	-	-	-	-	--		-	-
Greenock Morton	Total		86	37	-	-	-	-	-	-	86+	37+
Aberdeen	1964-65	Scottish Division One	0	0	0	0	0	0	0	0	0	0
Aberdeen	1965-66	Scottish Division One	34	8	5	1	6	2	0	0	45	11
Aberdeen	1966-67	Scottish Division One	31	13	6	2	10	5	0	0	47	20
Aberdeen	1967-68	Scottish Division One	10	3	0	0	4	0	4	0	18	3
Aberdeen	Total		75	24	11	3	20	7	4	0	110	34
Motherwell	1967-68	Scottish Division One	-	-	-	-	-	-	-	-	-	-
Motherwell	1968-69	Scottish Second Division	-	-	-	-	-	-	-	-	-	-
Motherwell	1969-70	Scottish Division One	-	-	-	-	-	-	-	-	-	-
Motherwell			83	11	5	0	16	4	0	0	104	15
Dundee	1970-71	Scottish Division One	21	0	2	0	5	1	0	0	28	1
Dundee	1971-72	Scottish Division One	19	1	0	0	4	0	5	0	28	1
Dundee	1972-73	Scottish Division One	21	3	4	1	10	2	0	0	35	6
Dundee	1973-74	Scottish Division One	23	4	5	1	5	1	0	0	33	6
Dundee	1974-75	Scottish Division One	6	0	0	0	4	0	1	0	11	0
Dundee	Total		90	8	11	2	28	4	6	0	135	14
Falkirk	1974-75	Scottish Second Division	10	1	0	0	0	0	-	-	10	1
Falkirk	1975-76	Scottish First Division	18	3	2	1	5	1	-	-	25	5
Falkirk	Total		28	4	2	1	5	1	-	-	35	6
Career total			374	86	29+	6+	70+	16+	10	0	483+	108+
