= Jim Storrie =

Scottish footballer and manager (1940-2014)

Personal information
- Full name: James Storrie
- Date of birth: 31 March 1940
- Place of birth: Kirkintilloch, Scotland
- Date of death: 11 November 2014 (aged 74)
- Place of death: Kilsyth, Scotland
- Position: Centre forward

Youth career
- Kelvinside Athletic

Senior career*
Years	Team	Apps	(Gls)
- Kilsyth Rangers
1958–1962	Airdrieonians	89	(48)
1962–1967	Leeds United	126	(58)
1967	Aberdeen	13	(3)
1967–1969	Rotherham United	71	(19)
1969–1972	Portsmouth	43	(12)
1972	→ Aldershot (on loan)	5	(1)
1972–1973	St Mirren	9	(3)
- Waterlooville
Total		356	(144)

Managerial career
- 1974-1976: Waterlooville
- 1976–1978: St Johnstone
- * Club domestic league appearances and goals

James Storrie (31 March 1940 – 11 November 2014) was a Scottish professional footballer and manager, best known as a centre forward who helped Leeds United gain promotion in 1964 to the First Division.

== Playing career ==
Born in Kirkintilloch, Dunbartonshire, Storrie began his senior career as a teenager at Airdrieonians, after playing alongside Willie Wallace at Kilsyth Rangers. He made his debut in the 1957–58 season, before being signed by Don Revie for Leeds United as a proven goalscorer for a fee of £15,000 in 1962. He scored the only goal on his debut in Leeds opening match of the 1962–63 season and went on to help Leeds win promotion to the First Division in the 1963–64 season, and to reach the 1965 FA Cup Final. Injuries reduced his first team opportunities and he faded out of the first team before joining Aberdeen in February 1967. He later played for Rotherham United, Portsmouth, Aldershot and St Mirren.

== Management career ==
After leaving St Mirren, Storrie joined Southern League club Waterlooville as player-manager. In 1976, he returned to Scotland as manager of St Johnstone. His last role in football was on the coaching staff back at his first senior club, Airdrie.

== Personal life ==
He died on 11 November 2014, aged 74.

== Career statistics ==
Club	League	FA Cup	League Cup	Europe	Total
	Apps (goals)	Apps (goals)	Apps (goals)	Apps (goals)	Apps (goals)
Airdrie					89 (48)
Leeds United	126 (58)	12 (3)	8 (5)	10 (1)	156 (67)
Aberdeen	13 (3)	4 (1)	6 (3)	2 (4)	25 (11)
Rotherham United					71 (19)
Portsmouth					43 (12)
Aldershot (on loan)					5 (1)
St Mirren					9 (3)

== Honours ==
Leeds United

- Football League Second Division: 1963–64
- FA Cup runner-up: 1964–65
