= Washington Whips =

Defunct American soccer club

- Full name: Washington Whips
- Nickname: Whips
- Founded: 1967
- Dissolved: 1968; 58 years ago
- Stadium: District of Columbia Stadium
- Capacity: 50,000
- Owner: Earl Foreman
- League: United Soccer Association; North American Soccer League
- 1968: 2nd, Atlantic Division
colors	Away colors

The Washington Whips were a soccer team based in Washington, D.C. that played in the United Soccer Association (USA). The league was made up of teams imported from foreign leagues. The Washington Whips were the Aberdeen F.C. from Scotland. The name was chosen as the outcome of a newspaper contest.

The team's owner was Earl Foreman, later owner of the Virginia Squires of the American Basketball Association and president of the original Major Indoor Soccer League. Edward T. Reynolds was the booth announcer for the club prior to the merger.

In 1967, the Whips played for the league championship and lost in overtime. After losing a coin toss, the Whips played the Los Angeles Wolves at the L.A. Coliseum in front of a crowd of 17,824. The two teams played to a 4–4 tie in regulation and then a 5–5 tie after the first overtime. At 1:26 in sudden death overtime, Ally Shewan of the Whips scored an own goal to give the game to the Wolves. Washington played with only 10 players for 94 minutes as Jim Smith was ejected in the 30th minute. After being tied 1–1 at half time, the teams scored 4 goals in 90 seconds early in the second half and then a pair of goals at the 82nd and 88th minutes tied it up again. After falling behind in overtime, the Whips tied the game with only 10 seconds remaining on a shot by Francis Munro.

Following the 1967 season, the USA merged with the National Professional Soccer League to form the North American Soccer League with the teams from the former USA having to create their rosters from scratch. Their home field was D.C. Stadium despite complaints after the 1967 season that the $109,000 a year rent was too high.

In 1968 they fielded the only one-armed player in NASL history, Victorio Casa of Argentina and they missed the playoffs on the final game of the season.

Following the 1968 season, the team disbanded and in November 1968, all players became free agents.

== Year-by-year ==
Year	League	W	L	T	Pts	Reg. season	Playoffs
1967	USA	5	2	5	15	1st, Eastern Division	Runners Up
1968	NASL	15	10	7	167	2nd, Atlantic Division	out of playoffs

== See also ==
- D.C. United
- Washington Darts
- Washington Diplomats
- Team America (NASL)
- Aberdeen FC
