= North American Soccer League on television =

Television series

North American Soccer League (NASL) was a professional soccer league with teams in the United States and Canada that operated from 1968 to 1984. Beginning in 1975, the league final was called the Soccer Bowl.

North American Soccer League Progression
Season	Teams	Games	Attendance	Network TV (Games)
1968	17	32	4,699	CBS
1969	5	16	2,930	None
1970	6	24	3,163	None
1971	8	24	4,154	None
1972	8	14	4,780	None
1973	9	19	5,954	None
1974	15	20	7,770	CBS (1)
1975	20	22	7,642	CBS (2)
1976	20	22	10,295	CBS (2)
1977	18	26	13,558	TVS (7)
1978	24	30	13,084	TVS (6)
1979	24	30	14,201	ABC (9)
1980	24	32	14,440	ABC (8)
1981	21	32	14,084	ABC (1)
1982	14	32	13,155	None
1983	12	30	13,258	None
1984	9	24	10,759	None
TV column includes only network TV. It does not include cable (ESPN, USA) or pay-per-view (SportsVision).

== CBS (1967–1976) ==
=== National Professional Soccer League (1967) ===
In 1967, two professional soccer leagues started in the United States: the FIFA-sanctioned United Soccer Association, which consisted of entire European and South American teams brought to the U.S. and given local names, and the unsanctioned National Professional Soccer League. The National Professional Soccer League had a national television contract in the U.S. with the CBS television network (which signed a two-year contract to broadcast a game every Sunday afternoon live and in color). The NPSL kicked off on Sunday, April 16 with a full slate of five matches. However, the ratings for matches were unacceptable even by weekend daytime standards and the arrangement was terminated. Bill MacPhail, head of CBS Sports, attributed NASL's lack of TV appeal to empty stadiums with few fans, and to undistinguished foreign players who were unfamiliar to American soccer fans.

Play-by-play voice Jack Whitaker was joined by the former Northern Ireland international Danny Blanchflower as a pundit. Blanchflower was not impressed with the standard of play and did not hesitate to say so.

The leagues merged in 1968 to form the North American Soccer League (NASL). It has been suggested that the timing of the merge was related to the huge amount of attention given throughout the English-speaking world to the victory by England in the 1966 FIFA World Cup and the resulting documentary film, Goal. While the USSF and FIFA refused to recognize the NPSL, the television contract with CBS guaranteed some element of financial stability.

=== Controversy ===
Toronto Croatia played in the National Soccer League until 1975 when they purchased the Toronto Metros of the North American Soccer League to form Toronto Metros-Croatia. During this period the team attracted many soccer stars, such as Portuguese superstar Eusébio, and were successful enough that they won Soccer Bowl '76 – a 3–0 win over the Minnesota Kicks – at the Kingdome in Seattle. The championship team was coached by Marijan Bilić, an immigrant to Canada who had played for Dinamo Zagreb. The champions' team was: Paolo Cimpiel, Ted Polak, Željko Bilecki, Ivan Lukačević, Robert Iarusci, Eusébio, Mladen Cukon, Carmine Marcantonio, Ivair Ferreira, Wolfgang Suhnholz, Damir Sutevski, Ivica Grnja, Filip Blašković and Chris Horrocks.

However, the NASL was never comfortable with the Croatia link (an obvious ethnic connection). League executives lobbied CBS to ensure they were only referred to as Toronto at the Soccer Bowl on television.

=== The Pelé effect ===
It was during the 1975 season that the New York Cosmos acquired the Brazilian star Pelé, whom they had been attempting to sign since the team was created. Steve Ross had apparently not heard of him before getting involved in soccer, but agreed to finance the transfer when Clive Toye compared the Brazilian's popularity to that of the Pope. Pelé joined the Cosmos on June 10, 1975, on a salary of $1.4 million per year, an enormous wage for an athlete at that time. A number of contracts—only one of which mentioned soccer—were set up for Pelé to ensure that he paid the lowest amount of tax possible, including one as a "recording artist" with Warner subsidiary Atlantic Records. "We owned him lock, stock and barrel," Toye retrospectively boasted.

Pelé's arrival created a media sensation and overnight transformed the fortunes of soccer in the United States. The Pelé deal was later described by Gavin Newsham, an English writer, as "the transfer coup of the century". His arrival turned the Cosmos from a motley crew of foreigners, semiprofessionals and students into a huge commercial presence. The club's groundsman, on hearing that the Brazilian's début for New York was to be broadcast on CBS, spray-painted the pitch green to disguise how little grass was on it: the match, against the Dallas Tornado, was broadcast to 22 countries and covered by more than 300 journalists from all over the world. From the moment he signed his contract at the 21 Club on June 10, 1975, in front of ecstatic Steve Ross and a crush of worldwide media, the player's every move was followed, bringing attention and credibility to the sport in America. As previously mentioned, his debut NASL match five days later versus the Dallas Tornado at the dilapidated Downing Stadium on Randall's Island was broadcast live on CBS network—the first regular-season NASL match on U.S. network TV in six years.

It was the Cosmos' tenth match of the season and led by the Brazilian, who recorded an assist and a goal; New York came back from two goals down for the 2–2 final score. The contest was also Pelé's first competitive match in eight months since his last outing with Santos FC in October 1974. He would eventually end up with five goals in his debut season during which his biggest challenge became figuring out how to fit into this team of journeymen players with abilities far inferior to his. Still his biggest impact was on the sport in New York and the rest of America as Cosmos' home attendance got tripled in just half the season he was there. They also played in front of huge crowds on the road since everyone wanted to see Pelé - toward the end of the season when he pulled a hamstring and couldn't suit up, 20,000 fans in Philadelphia showed up just to see him in street clothes. Furthermore, the league's profile got raised as other NASL teams - encouraged by Ross' investment in Pelé and the prominence his arrival brought to the Cosmos franchise - started bringing over more big-name aging foreign stars such as George Best who was about to turn 30, 31-year-old Rodney Marsh, 34-year-old Geoff Hurst, and 35-year-old Bobby Moore.

=== Commentators ===
- Paul Gardner - Gardner was the color commentator for the first-ever live telecast in the United States of a World Cup final, in 1982 on ABC. He also served as ABC color commentator with Jim McKay for NASL games in 1979–81. He also did commentary for NBC (1986 World Cup), CBS (NASL) and ESPN (college), and has been a film producer and was the scriptwriter and soccer adviser for the award-winning instructional series Pele: The Master and His Method in 1973.
- Frank Glieber - In 1963, Glieber began a long career with CBS television. Over the next two decades he would broadcast a variety of events for the network including NFL football, NBA and NCAA basketball, professional bowling, tennis, NASL soccer, and golf (including the Masters Tournament each spring). Glieber continued to broadcast local Dallas area sports events during his time at CBS, working as many as sixteen hours a day.
- Mario Machado - He was the voice of soccer for the CBS television network in 1968 and in 1976, covering the North American Soccer League (NASL). He hosted the weekly soccer program, The Best of the World Cup for the Spanish International Network. Machado hosted All-Star Soccer from England (a syndicated version of ATV's Star Soccer) on Public Broadcasting Service (PBS) Public television stations for six years.
- Seamus Malin - He also worked with the NASL's Boston Minutemen and New York Cosmos. He also called World Cup matches for NBC, ABC, and Turner Network Television, plus matches on CBS when the network had NASL rights.
- Jon Miller - His first network exposure came in 1976, when he was selected by CBS-TV to broadcast the NASL Championship Game. From 1974–1976, Miller did play-by-play for the Washington Diplomats of the NASL. He also announced the Soccer Game of the Week for nationally syndicated TVS from 1977–1978.

== TVS Television Network and Mizlou Television Network (1977–1978) ==
Soccer Bowl '78 was broadcast live in the United States on the TVS network. Jon Miller handled play-by-play duties, while Paul Gardner was the color analyst. This would be the final NASL game broadcast by the network, as the league signed a deal with ABC Sports in the fall of 1978. Gardner would continue as the color analyst for ABC's coverage, while Miller would move on to a long career announcing Major League Baseball.

Mizlou produced the first "live" coast-to-coast satellite feed, of a New York Cosmos soccer game, from San Jose, California to WOR-TV in New York in the late 1970s.

== ABC (1979–1981) ==
In 1979, ABC Sports began covering the NASL in a deal that called for 9 telecasts of league games, including the playoffs and Soccer Bowl. In 1979, the team from the "Village of Vancouver", the Whitecaps (a reference to ABC TV sportscaster Jim McKay's observation that "Vancouver must be like the deserted village right now", with so many people watching the game on TV) beat the powerhouse New York Cosmos in one of the most thrilling playoff series in NASL history to advance to the Soccer Bowl. In the Soccer Bowl, they triumphed against the Tampa Bay Rowdies in a disappointed New York City.

=== Decline ===
On October 1, 1977, Pelé closed out his legendary career in an exhibition match between the Cosmos and Santos. Santos arrived in New York and New Jersey after previously defeating the Seattle Sounders 2–0. The match was played in front of a capacity crowd at Giants Stadium and was televised in the United States on ABC's Wide World of Sports as well as throughout the world. After the retirement of Pelé in 1977, much of the progress that American soccer had made during his stay was lost; there was no star at the same level to replace him as the NASL's headline act. After enduring briefly during the late 1970s, attendances dropped after 1980. The sport's popularity fell and the media lost interest. The deal with broadcaster ABC to broadcast NASL matches was also lost in 1980, and the 1981 Soccer Bowl was only shown on tape delay. All of the franchises quickly became unprofitable, and a salary cap enforced before the 1984 season only delayed the inevitable.

=== Commentators ===
- Paul Gardner
- Verne Lundquist
- Jim McKay

== ESPN and USA Network (1981–1984) ==
In the last few years of its existence, the NASL did manage to get some games on a new cable sports network that had begun in 1979 called ESPN. In 1981, they signed a contract to broadcast 20 games on Saturdays. The new USA Network also carried games, usually on Wednesday nights.

=== Major Indoor Soccer League ===
The 1982–83 Major Indoor Soccer League season was the fifth in league history and would end with the San Diego Sockers winning their first MISL title. It would be the Sockers' second straight indoor championship, as the club had won the North American Soccer League's indoor league the previous spring.

The league would enter into an agreement with the NASL in the summer of 1982 to begin plans for an eventual merger. Initial plans to have all 14 NASL teams play in the winter would not come to pass, as most teams preferred to concentrate on the outdoor season. However, the Chicago Sting and Golden Bay Earthquakes would join the Sockers for the MISL season.

The MISL continued to make inroads on national television. While the spring would see the end of the league's two-year deal with the USA Network, CBS would broadcast a playoff game live from Cleveland on May 7 that drew an estimated four million viewers.

With the NASL near death in the summer of 1984, a handful of teams made plans to switch from outdoor to indoor soccer once the NASL season ended in October. Along with the Sockers, the Chicago Sting, Minnesota Strikers and New York Cosmos formally made the leap in late August. With the addition of the Dallas Sidekicks, the league went back to a 14-team, two-division setup.

This would be the final year the MISL would have games aired on network television, CBS broadcast Game 4 of the championship series live on May 25.

=== Commentators (USA Network) ===
- Spencer Ross
- Kyle Rote, Jr.
- Werner Roth
- Al Trautwig

== CBC (Canada) 1971 ==
For one season in 1971, after the NASL expanded to Toronto and Montreal, the league made a deal to televise 10 matches (including that year's European Cup final) on the CBC. Of the remaining 9 matches, four each were hosted by Toronto and Montreal, with the odd match being Montreal visiting Dallas. Tom McKee did play-by-play, with Tom Pennington and Tony Hodge as color commentators. The deal lasted one season.

== Local stations ==
WTTW in Chicago carried at least one Sting soccer game (against New York and Pelé, at Giants Stadium) in the early days of that franchise.

WTOG in St. Petersburg, FL aired numerous Tampa Bay Rowdies road games in the late 1970s and early 1980s. Additionally, many of the Rowdies home and away indoor matches were also broadcast.

=== List of broadcasters ===
Team	Television station	Television announcers
Atlanta Chiefs(1967)	WSB-TV	
Atlanta Chiefs (1979)	WTBS	Bob Neal and Terry Hanson
Baltimore Bays	WJZ-TV	John Kennelly and Clive Toye
Boston Beacons	WSBK-TV	Dom Valentino
Boston Minutemen	WBZ-TV (Edited highlights only)	Roger Twibell and Seamus Malin
Boston Shamrock Rovers	WKBG-TV (tape delay only)	Fred Cusick and Seamus Malin
California Surf	KHJ-TV ON TV; KTLA; KCOP-TV (highlights only)	Gil Stratton and Dick Calvert
Calgary Boomers	CFAC-TV	Ed Whalen
Caribous of Colorado	KOA-TV	Larry Zimmer
Chicago Mustangs	WFLD	
Chicago Spurs	WGN-TV	Lloyd Pettit
Chicago Sting	SportsVision; WGN-TV; WTTW; WFLD	Roy Leonard, Howard Balson, and Ken Stern
Cleveland Stokers	WEWS-TV	Paul Wilcox
Dallas Tornado	KTVT; KDTV WFAA; KTWS-TV	Verne Lundquist and Brad Sham
Detroit Express	WXON-TV WKBD-TV	Jim Forney and John Camkin orJimmy Hill
Edmonton Drillers	CFRN-DT	Al McCann, Brian Rice, Randy Hahn, and Vic Rauter
Fort Lauderdale Strikers	WTVJ WPLG; WCIX; ON TV	Roger Twibell Chuck Dowdle, Frank Forte, and Garo Yepremian; Arnie Warren and David Irving
Houston Hurricane	KRIV-TV; KHOU	Mario Machado and Hans von Mende Dan Patrick and Kyle Rote Jr.
Jacksonville Tea Men	WJXT	Frank Smith or Frank Timoney and Arthur Smith
Los Angeles Aztecs	KWHY KHJ-TV; ONTV; KTTV; KMEX-TV	Chick Hearn Gil Stratton and Norm Jackson; Tom Kelly and Dan Avey; Mario Machado; Hugo Bandi; Luis Bravo; Jorge Posada
Los Angeles Toros	KHJ-TV	Stan Richards; Mario Machado
Los Angeles Wolves	KTLA	Chick Hearn
Memphis Rogues	WMC-TV WPTY-TV	Kevin Card and Rudi Schiffer Bill McDermott and Jack Eaton
Minnesota Kicks	KSTP-TV; WCCO-TV	Bob Bruce, Rod Trongard, and Trevor Iseman
Minnesota Strikers	KITN-TV	Frank Mazzocco
Montreal Manic	TVA(CFTM-TV local)	Claudine Douville, Pierre Donais, Francis Millien, and Michel Champagne (French)
New England Tea Men	WBZ-TV; WLVI; WVIT; WPRI-TV	Gil Santos, John Smith, Bill Alex, Steve Glendye, and Scott Wahle
New York Cosmos	WNET; WPIX; WOR-TV; HBO; Trans World International	Crane Davis and Kyle Rote Jr. Jim Karvellas, Pete Gogolak, Howard David, Seamus Malin, Lee Arthur, and Werner Roth; Jim Karvellas, Steve Albert, Dick Stockton, Spencer Ross, Tom Kelly and Clive Toye; Tom Kelly and Clive Toye
New York Generals	WPIX(all tape delay)	
Oakland Clippers	KTVU (tape delay)	
Oakland Stompers	KRON-TV	Art Eckman and Jack Hyde
Philadelphia Atoms	WPHL-TV; WTAF-TV	Gene Hart and Walter Chyzowych
Philadelphia Fury	WPHL-TV	Al Meltzer and Walter Chyzowych
Philadelphia Spartans	WPHL-TV	
Pittsburgh Phantoms	WIIC	Red Donley
Rochester Lancers	WOKR-TV	Jack Palvino, Ron DeFrance, Chuck Schiano, and Tom Pipines
San Antonio Thunder	KWEX-TV	Tony Tirado (Spanish)
San Diego Sockers	XETV KUSI-TV	Joe Starkey and George Logan Randy Hahn and Alan Mayer
San Jose Earthquakes	KBHK-TV; KGO-TV; Gill Cable; KICU-TV	Bob Ray, Hal Ramey, Dave Chaplik, Jon Miller, and Pat Hughes
Seattle Sounders	KCTS-TV	Bob Robertson, Steve Fimmel, Cliff McCrath, Simon Ostler, and Keith Dysart
St. Louis Stars	KPLR-TV	Frank Gleiber and Greg Marecek
Tampa Bay Rowdies	WTOG	Bob Wolff and Tom Keene
Team America	Budweiser Network (syndication, home matches only, blacked out in Washington area)	Bob Carpenter, Gordon Bradley, and Mike Lange
Toronto Metros-Croatia/Blizzard	Global(CKGN)	Mike Anscombe, Bruce Buchanan, Bob Irving, Shep Messing, Fergie Olver, and Jim Tatti
Toronto Falcons	CHCH-TV	
Tulsa Roughnecks	KTUL KJRH; Tulsa Cable Sports	Chris Lincoln, Bob Carpenter, Gordon Bradley, and Al Miller
Vancouver Whitecaps	BCTV	Bernie Pascall
Washington Darts	WETA (Championship second leg only)	
Washington Diplomats	WTTG	Jon Miller, Don Earle, and Terry Hanson
Washington Diplomats (1981)	WTTG	Jim Forney and Jimmy Hill

== Soccer Bowl coverage ==
The following is a list of the television networks and announcers that have broadcast the Soccer Bowl, which was the annual championship competition of the North American Soccer League.

=== 1980s ===
Year	Network	Play-by-play	Color commentator(s)	Touchline reporter
1984	Sportsvision; TSN	Howard Balson	Ken Stern	
1983	USA; CTV	Bob Carpenter	Gordon Bradley	Al Miller
1982	USA; CTV	Spencer Ross	Werner Roth	
1981	ABC; CTV	Verne Lundquist	Paul Gardner	
1980	ABC; CTV	Jim McKay	Paul Gardner	Verne Lundquist

==== Notes ====
- 1984 - Sportsvision televised the series in the Chicago area; this coverage was simulcast on the then-new TSN (which had started up a month earlier) cable channel in Canada.
- From 1978 until 1984, Bob Carpenter called soccer games for the Tulsa Roughnecks of the North American Soccer League and the St. Louis Steamers of the Major Indoor Soccer League. He announced two World Cups for ESPN; 1982 with Bob Ley and 1994 (10 games) with Seamus Malin and Clive Charles.
- 1981 - ABC aired the Soccer Bowl on tape delay.

=== 1970s ===
Year	Network	Play-by-play	Color commentator(s)	Touchline reporter
1979	ABC; CTV	Jim McKay	Paul Gardner	Verne Lundquist
1978	TVS	Jon Miller	Paul Gardner	
1977	TVS	Jon Miller	Paul Gardner	Walter Chyzowych
1976	CBS; CBC	Jon Miller		
1975	CBS	Frank Glieber	Jack Whitaker	
1974	CBS	Frank Glieber	Clive Toye and Kyle Rote Jr.	
1973	Not televised			
1972	Not televised			
1971	Not televised			
1970	Not televised			

==== Notes ====
- 1978 - This would be the final NASL game broadcast TVS, as the league signed a deal with ABC Sports in the fall of 1978. Gardner would continue as the color analyst for ABC's coverage, while Miller would move on to a long career announcing Major League Baseball.
- Alongside Gene Hart doing play-by-play, Walter Chyzowych provided color commentary for the 1973 Finals of the North American Soccer League between the Philadelphia Atoms and the Dallas Tornado. He also served as the touchline reporter at Soccer Bowl '77.
- In 1964, Paul Gardner left the medical magazine and spent two years in Italy before returning to New York, where he discovered a sudden American interest in pro soccer. The United Soccer Association and the National Professional Soccer League – which eventually merged into the NASL – launched in 1967. The emergence of American pro soccer in the late 1960s coincided with Gardner's start as a full-time free-lance journalist and he has since covered soccer for publications on both sides of the Atlantic. Gardner was the color commentator for the first-ever live telecast in the United States of a World Cup final, in 1982 on ABC. He also served as ABC color commentator with legendary Jim McKay of NASL games in 1979–81. He also did commentary for NBC (1986 World Cup), CBS (NASL) and ESPN (college), and has been a film producer and was the scriptwriter and soccer adviser for the award-winning instructional series Pele: The Master and His Method in 1973.
- Jon Miller's first network exposure came in 1976, when he was selected by CBS-TV to broadcast the NASL Championship Game. From 1974 to 1976, Miller did play-by-play for the Washington Diplomats of the NASL. He also announced the Soccer Game of the Week for nationally syndicated TVS from 1977 to 1978.
- 1974 - Although the Aztecs had a league-best record and points total, and rightly should have hosted the championship final, CBS intervened and strongly influenced the NASL's decision to play the match in Miami. CBS was under contract to air the game live and was unwilling to black-out the large Southern California viewing audience. At the time it was the standard in many U.S.-based sports for the host market not to broadcast games locally unless they were sold out. At the time, the Los Angeles Memorial Coliseum had a capacity of 94,500 and, even in a best-case scenario, an Aztecs sell-out was unlikely. Moreover, in an effort by CBS to capture more viewers during the peak East Coast time slot, a Los Angeles-hosted game would have begun at 12:30 (PDT) local time. The league recognized that both these factors would be detrimental to ticket sales and agreed to move the game to the Miami Orange Bowl with a 3:30 (EDT) local start. CBS had also stepped in the previous week and forced the Toros to play their semifinal match at the much-smaller Tamiami Stadium in Tamiami Park. This was done so that if Miami did win, CBS's production crews would have a full week for set-up in the Orange Bowl stadium.
- In 1963, Frank Glieber began a long career with CBS television. Over the next two decades, he broadcast a variety of events for the network including NFL, NBA and NCAA basketball, professional bowling, tennis, NASL soccer, and golf (including the Masters Tournament each spring). Glieber continued to broadcast local Dallas area sports events during his time at CBS, working as many as sixteen hours a day. He was also a commentator for the World Series of Poker.

=== 1960s ===
Year	Network	Play-by-play	Color commentator(s)	Touchline reporter
1969	With only five teams in the league, no championship event was held that year. In a close finish, the NASL trophy was awarded to the Kansas City Spurs, the team with the most points at the end of the season. The season was completed on August 31, 1969.			
1968	CBS	Mario Machado	Clive Toye	
1967	CBS	Jack Whitaker	Danny Blanchflower	

==== Notes ====
- As a star collegiate athlete and former soccer player, Mario Machado was able to indulge his love for soccer by serving as the Voice of Soccer for the CBS Television Network in 1968 and in 1976, covering the North American Soccer League (NASL). He did the television play-by-play of both legs for CBS' broadcast of the NASL's first championship.
- Danny Blanchflower was the color commentator for the CBS television network broadcasts of National Professional Soccer League (NASL) matches in the United States in 1967. His candor about the fledgling league's shortcomings distressed network executives, as he recounted in a June 10, 1968 Sports Illustrated article he authored.
- In 1966, a group of sports entrepreneurs led by Bill Cox and Robert Hermann formed a consortium called the North American Professional Soccer League with the intention of forming a professional soccer league in United States and Canada. However this was just one of three groups with similar plans. The NAPSL eventually merged with one of these groups, the National Soccer League, led by Richard Millen, to form the National Professional Soccer League. A third group, the United Soccer Association was sanctioned by both the USSFA and FIFA. Because of this the NPSL was branded an outlaw league by FIFA and players faced sanctions for signing with it. Despite this the NPSL, which secured a TV contract from CBS, set about recruiting players, and announced it would be ready to launch in 1967. In December 1967, the NPSL merged with the United Soccer Association to form the North American Soccer League. It has been suggested that the timing of the merge was related to the huge amount of attention given throughout the English-speaking world to the victory by England in the 1966 FIFA World Cup and the resulting documentary film, Goal. While the USSF and FIFA refused to recognize the NPSL, the television contract with CBS guaranteed some element of financial stability.

== See also ==
- Major Indoor Soccer League (1978–1992) on television
- Women's United Soccer Association on television
