= Soccer Bowl =

Soccer tournament

Soccer Bowl NASL Championship Final
- The trophy awarded to champions
- Organizing body: NASL
- Founded: 1968; 57 years ago
- Abolished: 1984; 41 years ago
- Region: United States; Canada
- Number of teams: 2
- Last champion(s): (United States) Chicago Sting (1984)
- Most successful club(s): (United States) New York Cosmos (5 titles)

The Soccer Bowl was the annual championship game of the North American Soccer League (NASL), which ran from 1968 to 1984. The two top teams from the playoffs faced off in the final to determine the winner of the NASL Trophy. From the league's founding in 1968 through 1974, the championship game (or series, as it was played through 1971) was known as the NASL Championship Final, and in 1984 the single game was replaced by a best-of-three series known as the Soccer Bowl Series.

== History ==
The NASL championships began as a two-game aggregate goal series in 1968 and switched to a best-of-three series in 1971. In 1972, the league adopted a single-game championship hosted by the higher-seeded club.

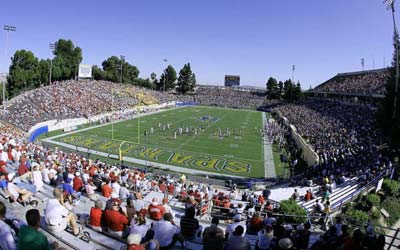
Spartan Stadium in San Jose, California, hosted the first Soccer Bowl in 1975.

Then-NASL commissioner Phil Woosnam wanted to build excitement for the championship game. He envisioned a week-long, neutral-site championship event in the mold of the NFL's Super Bowl. On August 24, 1975, the first Soccer Bowl was played at Spartan Stadium in San Jose, California, as the Tampa Bay Rowdies defeated the Portland Timbers. Unlike the Super Bowl, the NASL's annual numbering scheme did not use Roman numerals (e.g., Super Bowl IX), but instead used the last two digits of the year played (e.g., Soccer Bowl '78).

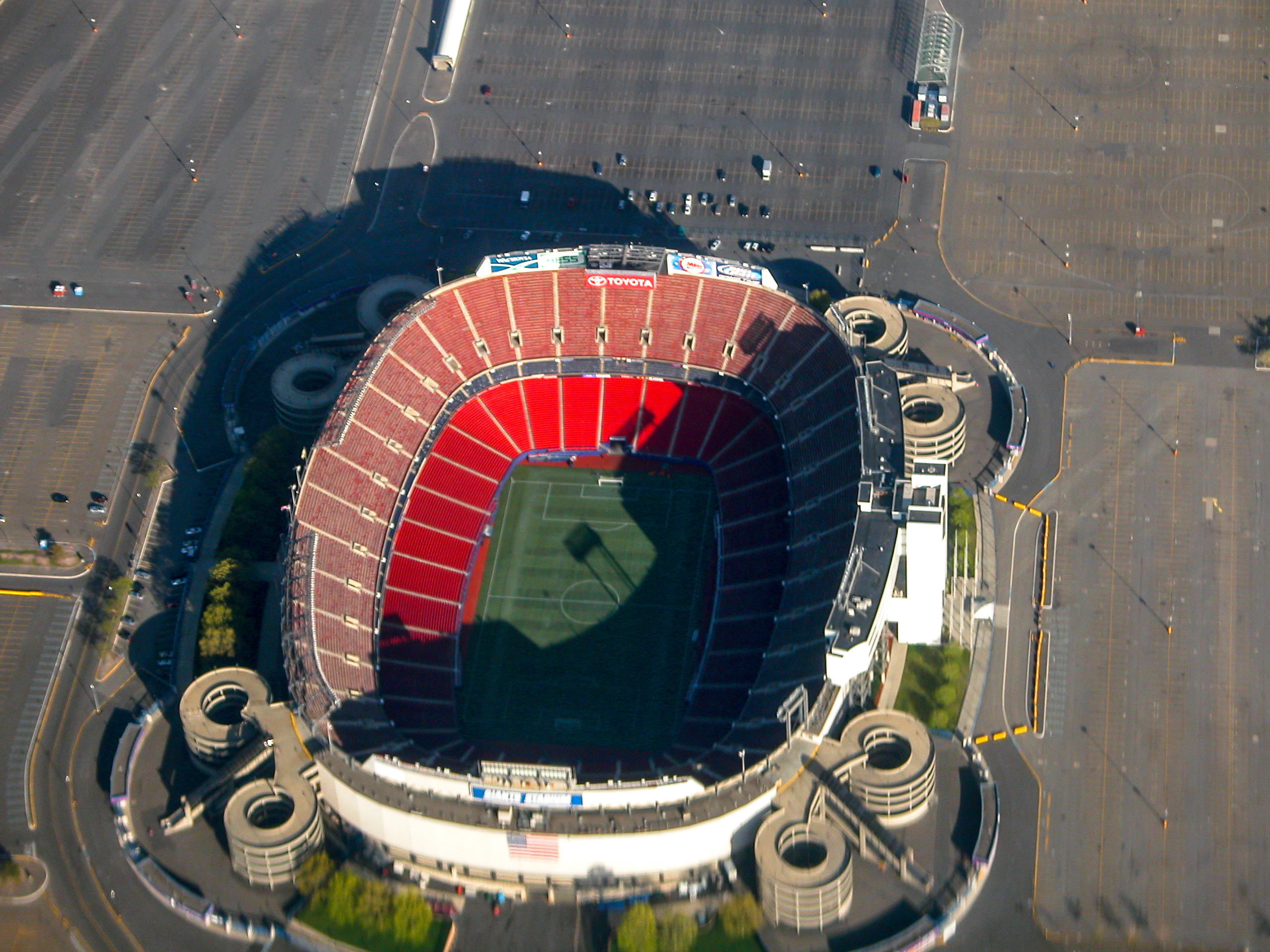
Giants Stadium hosted Soccer Bowl '78 with a record 74,091 in attendance.

Under Woosnam's guidance, the Soccer Bowl became a major sporting event. The biggest attendance was for Soccer Bowl '78, when 74,091 filled Giants Stadium in the New York metropolitan area, still the highest attendance to date for any club soccer championship in the United States.

The last Soccer Bowl returned to a best-of-three series format and occurred in early October 1984. The league ceased operation in 1985.

== Format ==
The NASL used several different formats for its championship matches over the course of its history.

The 1968 and 1970 NASL Finals were contested with a two-game series, one in each of the two teams' stadiums, and the winner decided by aggregate goals.

The NASL contracted from 17 teams to 5 for the 1969 season, so no final was held. Instead, as in many leagues in Europe, the championship was awarded to the team with the most points at season's end.

The 1971 NASL Final was played in a best-of-three series, with games one and three hosted by the higher-seeded team.

After 1971, the NASL Championship Final switched to a single game. The 1972 through 1974 were hosted by the highest-seeded team. In 1975, Woosnam's dream of a neutral-site event became reality, and the Soccer Bowl was born. That format continued through the 1983 final.

For the league's final season in 1984, the finals reverted to a best-of-three series, although it retained the "Soccer Bowl" moniker, used alternately with "Soccer Bowl Series".

== Legacy ==
A new minor league North American Soccer League began play in 2011, borrowing much of the iconography of the original. This second league used the name "Soccer Bowl" for their championship match in 2013, and then only for the championship trophy itself from 2014 through the end of the league in 2017.

== Results ==
Sources: WildStat, NASL, Steve Dimitry, Soccer Times

NASL Championship Final (1968–1974)
Final	Champions	Runners-up	Score	Venue	City	Attend.	Agg.
1968	Atlanta Chiefs	San Diego Toros	0–0	Balboa Stadium	San Diego	9,360	3–0
1968	Atlanta Chiefs	San Diego Toros	3–0	Atlanta Stadium	Atlanta	14,994	3–0
1969	(not held) Kansas City Spurs awarded as league champions (Note: No final was held. Kansas City finished first in the regular season and was awarded the championship.)						
1970	Rochester Lancers	Washington Darts	3–0	Aquinas Memorial	Rochester	9,321	4–3
1970	Rochester Lancers	Washington Darts	1–3	Brookland Stadium	Washington, D.C.	5,543	4–3
1971	Dallas Tornado	Atlanta Chiefs	1–2	Atlanta Stadium	Atlanta	3,218	2–1 (Note: Result on games won, as a best-of-three series)
1971	Dallas Tornado	Atlanta Chiefs	4–1	Franklin Stadium	Dallas	6,456	2–1
1971	Dallas Tornado	Atlanta Chiefs	2–0	Atlanta Stadium	Atlanta	4,687	2–1
1972	New York Cosmos	St. Louis Stars	2–1	Hofstra Stadium	Hempstead	6,102	–
1973	Philadelphia Atoms	Dallas Tornado	2–0	Texas Stadium	Irving	18,824	–
1974	Los Angeles Aztecs	Miami Toros	3–3 (5–3, p.)	Orange Bowl	Miami	15,507	–
Soccer Bowl (1975–1983)
1975	Tampa Bay Rowdies	Portland Timbers	2–0	Spartan Stadium	San Jose	17,483	–
1976	Toronto Metros-Croatia	Minnesota Kicks	3–0	Kingdome	Seattle	25,765	–
1977	New York Cosmos	Seattle Sounders	2–1	Civic Stadium	Portland	35,548	–
1978	New York Cosmos	Tampa Bay Rowdies	3–1	Giants Stadium	East Rutherford	74,901	–
1979	Vancouver Whitecaps	Tampa Bay Rowdies	2–1	Giants Stadium	East Rutherford	50,699	–
1980	New York Cosmos	Fort Lauderdale Strikers	3–0	RFK Stadium	Washington, D.C.	50,768	–
1981	Chicago Sting	New York Cosmos	0–0 (2–1, p.) (Note: From 1977 through 1984 the NASL had a variation of the penalty shoot-out procedure for tied matches. The shoot-out started 35 yards from the goal and allowed the player 5 seconds to attempt a shot. The player could make as many moves as he wanted in a breakaway situation within the time frame. NASL procedure during this era called for the box score to show an additional "goal" given to the winning side of a shoot-out.)	Exhibition Stadium	Toronto	36,971	–
1982	New York Cosmos	Seattle Sounders	1–0	Jack Murphy Stadium	San Diego	22,634	–
1983	Tulsa Roughnecks	Toronto Blizzard	2–0	BC Place	Vancouver	53,326	–
Soccer Bowl Series (1984)
1984	Chicago Sting	Toronto Blizzard	2–1	Comiskey Park	Chicago	8,352	2–0
1984	Chicago Sting	Toronto Blizzard	3–2	Varsity Stadium	Toronto	16,842	2–0

== See also ==
- North American Soccer League (2011–2017)
- United States soccer league system
- Canadian soccer league system
- North American Soccer League (1968–1984)
- National Professional Soccer League (1967)
- United Soccer Association (1967)
- North American Soccer League (1968–1984) on television
- Record attendances in United States club soccer
- Soccer Bowl (2011–2017)
- MLS Cup
