= Humberto Arrieta =

Mexican footballer (born 1945)

Personal information
- Date of birth: 11 September 1945 (age 81)
- Place of birth: Victoria de Durango, Durango Mexico
- Height: 1.91 m (6 ft 3 in)
- Position: Goalkeeper

Senior career*
Years	Team	Apps	(Gls)
1965–1968	América	1	(0)
1968	San Diego Toros	11	(0)
1969–1975	Dallas Tornado	14	(0)
- * Club domestic league appearances and goals

Humberto Arrieta (born 11 September 1945) is a retired Mexican footballer. He played as a goalkeeper for América in his home country of Mexico and for the San Diego Toros and for Dallas Tornado throughout the mid-to-late 1960s and the early 1970s.

== Club career ==
Arrieta was first signed to América for their 1965–66 season. Despite the club winning the 1965–66 Mexican Primera División, Arrieta never made his professional debut for the club. His relative inactivity as a reserve into the following two seasons, only playing in friendlies as goalkeepers such as Amado Palacios continued to make appearances within the Starting XI with Arrieta himself being prone to injury. Facing a lack of opportunities in his home country of Mexico, he decided to play abroad for the San Diego Toros in the newly formed North American Soccer League alongside his América teammates Ataúlfo Sánchez and two other players for the 1968 season following the club's purchase by Mexican businessman Emilio Azcárraga Milmo. Arrieta played in fourteen games and contributed towards the club's victory in the Pacific Division. During the postseason, the club won the Conference Finals against the Kansas City Spurs and reached the NASL Final 1968, ultimately losing to the Atlanta Chiefs that season. He then played for the Dallas Tornado for the remainder of his career, having relative success in the 1969 season as he was the second-leading goalkeeper in the overall league. Despite this, beginning in the 1970s, he was relegated to a backup goalkeeper following the arrivals of players such as Kenny Cooper Sr. and Frank Hason.
