= Severo de Sales =

Mexican footballer (1940–2025)

Personal information
- Full name: Severo de Sales López
- Date of birth: 28 November 1940
- Place of birth: Chapala, Jalisco, Mexico
- Date of death: 7 September 2025 (aged 84)
- Place of death: Cuernavaca, Morelos, Mexico
- Height: 1.68 m (5 ft 6 in)
- Position: Defender

Senior career*
Years	Team	Apps	(Gls)
1961–1970	América	105	(0)
1968	→ San Diego Toros (loan)	31	(0)

International career
1962–1969	Mexico	5	(0)
- * Club domestic league appearances and goals

Severo de Sales López (28 November 1940 – 7 September 2025) was a Mexican footballer. He primarily played for América throughout the 1960s and the early 1970s within the Liga MX as well as for the San Diego Toros in 1968. He also represented Mexico for the 1969 CONCACAF Championship as the team's captain.

== Club career ==
De Sales began his career within América, making his debut during the second half of the 1961–62 season where the club ended as runners-up that season. He would then spend the rest of his career with the club, being part of the winning squad for the club's first ever national title at the 1965–66 Mexican Primera División season. He was also part of the winning squads of the 1963–64 and 1964–65 Copa México. He was then briefly loaned out to play in the San Diego Toros alongside fellow Mexican footballer Alberto Baeza where he played throughout the 1968 North American Soccer League season where he made 31 appearances and were runners-up for the season. He made his final appearance for the club during the first half of the 1969–70 season before retiring at the dawn of the new decade. By the time of his retirement, he made 105 appearances for the club and played in exactly 9,198 minutes for the Cremas.

== International career ==
De Sales was first called up for the 1962 CONCACAF Youth Tournament where he was part of the winning squad for Mexico. He then returned for the 1969 CONCACAF Championship where he was made captain of the team. He then went on to lead the team across all five matches with the team ending in fourth place.

== Personal life ==
De Sales died on 7 September 2025.
