= 1969 North American Soccer League season =

Soccer league season

North American Soccer League 1969 season
- Season: 1969
- Country: United States; Canada
- Teams: 5
- Champions: Kansas City Spurs
- Premiers: Kansas City Spurs most total points *Atlanta Chiefs best Win/Loss record
- Matches: 40
- Goals: 82 (2.05 per match)
- Top goalscorer: (South Africa) Kaizer Motaung (16 goals)
- Average attendance: 2,930

The 1969 North American Soccer League season was the second season of the North American Soccer League, the top division in US soccer in 1969.

Five teams competed in the league's 2nd season. The season was divided into two parts; the International Cup and the regular season. The Kansas City Spurs won the International Cup. The Kansas City Spurs also won the NASL championship by finishing at the top of the table in the regular season. For the second straight year the team with the best winning percentage (Atlanta) did not win the premiership due to the NASL's points system. But unlike the previous year, the Chiefs got no opportunity to claim any title, as this would be the only year that the league did not hold a post-season Championship Final.

== Changes from the previous season ==
No new teams were added and total of 12 teams folded between the 1968 and 1969 seasons:

- Boston Beacons
- Chicago Mustangs
- Cleveland Stokers
- Detroit Cougars
- Houston Stars
- Los Angeles Wolves
- New York Generals
- Oakland Clippers
- San Diego Toros
- Toronto Falcons
- Vancouver Royals
- Washington Whips

== Map of clubs ==
NASL clubs

== 1969 NASL International Cup ==
The NASL held a double round-robin tournament that was called the International Cup. The league imported teams from England and Scotland to stand in for the U.S. clubs.

Atlanta Chiefs were represented by Aston Villa
Baltimore Bays were represented by West Ham United
Dallas Tornado were represented by Dundee United
Kansas City Spurs were represented by Wolverhampton Wanderers
St. Louis Stars were represented by Kilmarnock F.C.

6 points for a win, 3 points for a tie, 0 points for a loss, 1 point for each goal scored up to three per game.

W = Wins, L = Losses, T= Ties, GF = Goals For, GA = Goals Against, Pts= point system

International Cup Standings	W	L	T	GF	GA	Pts
Kansas City Spurs	6	2	0	25	13	57
Baltimore Bays	5	2	1	23	13	52
Dallas Tornado	2	4	2	13	22	31
Atlanta Chiefs	2	4	2	10	16	28
St. Louis Stars	2	5	1	11	18	26

== NASL Final 1969 season standings ==
NASL Final 1969
- Event: NASL Final
Kansas City Spurs	Atlanta Chiefs
–	–
- (No final held); Championship awarded to team with most points in the season
- Date: August 31, 1969

The regular season rosters were made of the teams' own players. With no playoff or final, Kansas City was crowned league champion.

The team with the most points in the regular season was crowned league champion. Due to the NASL's unusual points system, this was not the team with the best won-loss percentage or the most victories. The Kansas City Spurs posted a record of 10 wins, 2 losses, and 4 ties, for 110 points to claim the title, while the Atlanta Chiefs posted a superior record of 11 wins, 2 losses, and 3 ties, but managed only 109 points.

6 points for a win, 3 points for a tie, 0 points for a loss, 1 point for each goal scored up to three per game.

W = Wins, L = Losses, T= Ties, GF = Goals For, GA = Goals Against, GD = Goal Differential, Pts= point system, Avg Att= Average Attendance

-Premiers (most points). -Best record.

1969 NASL season standings
Teams	W	L	T	GF	GA	GD	Pts	Avg Att
Kansas City Spurs	10	2	4	53	28	+25	110	4,273
Atlanta Chiefs	11	2	3	46	20	+26	109	3,371
Dallas Tornado	8	6	2	32	31	+1	82	2,923
St. Louis Stars	3	11	2	24	47	-23	47	2,274
Baltimore Bays	2	13	1	27	56	-29	42	1,238

1969 NASL Champions: Kansas City Spurs

== Full year standings ==
1969 NASL combined standings	W	L	T	GF	GA	Pts
Kansas City Spurs	16	4	4	78	41	167
Atlanta Chiefs	13	6	5	56	36	137
Dallas Tornado	10	10	4	45	53	113
Baltimore Bays	7	15	2	50	69	94
St. Louis Stars	5	16	3	35	65	73

== NASL All-Stars ==
First Team	Position
(Uruguay) Leonel Conde, Kansas City	G
(United States) John Borodiak, Baltimore	D
(Greece) Kirk Apostolidis, Dallas	D
(Costa Rica) William Quirós, Kansas City	M
(United States) John Best, Dallas	M
(Poland) Joe Puls, St. Louis	M
(Uruguay) Pepe Fernandez, Kansas City	F
(South Africa) Kaizer Motaung, Atlanta	F
(United States) Manfred Seissler, Kansas City	F
(United States) Ilija Mitic, Dallas	F
(Zambia) Emment Kapengwe, Atlanta • (Jamaica) Art Welch, Baltimore	F

== Post season awards ==
- Most Valuable Player: (Uruguay) Cirilio Fernandez, Kansas City
- Coach of the year: (Hungary) Janos Bedl, Kansas City
- Rookie of the year: (United States) Siegfried Stritzl, Baltimore
