= Eli Durante =

Brazilian footballer

Personal information
- Place of birth: São Paulo, Brazil
- Position: Striker

Senior career*
Years	Team	Apps	(Gls)
1967	Los Angeles Toros	23	(15)
1968	San Diego Toros	6	(1)
1968	St. Louis Stars	6	(1)
1970	Kansas City Spurs	22	(8)
1971–1975	Rochester Lancers	90	(5)
- * Club domestic league appearances and goals

Eli Durante is a Brazilian retired footballer who played in the North American Soccer League from 1967 to 1975.

In 1967, Durante moved to the United States and signed with the Los Angeles Toros of the National Professional Soccer League. He was the league's third leading scorer that season. At the end of the season, the NPSL merged with the United Soccer Association to form the North American Soccer League and the Toros moved to San Diego. Durante played six games with the Toros before moving to the St. Louis Stars.

In 1969, Durante signed with the Kansas City Spurs as it won the league title. The Spurs folded at the end of the 1970 season and Durante moved to the Rochester Lancers where he spent the last five seasons of his career. After retiring from soccer, Durante returned to Kansas City where he lived before buying Florida Forklift Supply, LLC in 2008.

== Awards and honors ==
In 1977, he was named to the Rochester Lancers Team of the Decade. On 27 December 2014, the Rochester Lancers of the Major Arena Soccer League will induct Durante into the Rochester Lancers Wall of Fame as one of Rochester's "soccer pioneers". Durante played for the original Rochester Lancers of the North American Soccer League.
