= 1968 North American Soccer League season =

Soccer league season

North American Soccer League 1968 season
- Season: 1968
- Country: United States; Canada
- Champions: Atlanta Chiefs
- Premiers: San Diego Toros most total points *Atlanta Chiefs best Won/Loss record
- Matches: 271
- Goals: 924 (3.41 per match)
- Top goalscorer: (Poland) Janusz Kowalik (30 goals)
- Average attendance: 4,669

The 1968 North American Soccer League season was the 56th season of FIFA-sanctioned soccer in the United States and Canada, and the 1st with a national first-division league with the inaugural season of the NASL.

The NASL was formed this year as a merger between the former top division soccer leagues, the United Soccer Association along with the National Professional Soccer League. In the inaugural year, the Atlanta Chiefs were the champions, by winning the NASL Final 3–0, in a two-game aggregate over the San Diego Toros. While the Chiefs were the champions for the season, the premiers for this season were the Toros, who obtained the highest point total.

== Overview ==
17 teams competed in this inaugural season, and the Atlanta Chiefs won the championship. While San Diego won the premiership, Atlanta's winning percentage was higher because a match had been canceled. This would mark the first of five times in the league's history that the best record did not equate to a premiership. The Oakland Clippers had an identical record to the Western Division Champion Toros and a higher goal-differential, but just as with Atlanta the Toros had more league points. Oakland had won every competition in the NPSL's 1967 season, but were denied a chance to defend their title in the merged league because of this unique points system.

- 8 came from the NPSL: Atlanta, Baltimore, Kansas City (from Chicago), New York, Oakland, St. Louis, San Diego ( from Los Angeles) and Toronto.
- 9 came from the USA: Boston (nickname changed), Chicago, Cleveland, Dallas, Detroit, Houston, Los Angeles, Vancouver (nickname shortened) and Washington.
- 2 teams from the NPSL folded (Philadelphia and Pittsburgh).
- 3 teams from the USA folded (New York, San Francisco and Toronto).
- 2 teams, Houston (USA) and St. Louis (NPSL), had the same nickname the "Stars".

== Map of clubs ==
Atlantic Division Lakes Division Gulf Division Pacific Division

== Regular season ==
W = Wins, L = Losses, T= Ties, GF = Goals For, GA = Goals Against, Pts= point system, Avg Att= Average Attendance

6 points for a win, 3 points for a tie, 0 points for a loss, 1 point for each goal scored up to three per game.

-Premiers (most points). -Best record. -Other playoff teams.

=== Eastern Conference ===
Atlantic Division	W	L	T	GF	GA	Pts	Avg Att
Atlanta Chiefs	18	7	6	50	32	174	5,794
Washington Whips	15	10	7	50	32	167	6,586
New York Generals	12	8	12	62	54	164	5,606
Baltimore Bays	13	16	3	42	43	128	4,628
Boston Beacons	9	17	6	51	69	121	4,004

Lakes Division	W	L	T	GF	GA	Pts	Avg Att
Cleveland Stokers	14	7	11	62	44	175	4,305
Chicago Mustangs	13	10	9	68	68	164	2,463
Toronto Falcons	13	13	6	55	69	144	5,284
Detroit Cougars	6	21	4	48	65	88	4,266

=== Western Conference ===
Gulf Division	W	L	T	GF	GA	Pts	Avg Att
Kansas City Spurs	16	11	5	61	43	158	8,510^
Houston Stars	14	12	6	58	41	150	3,246
St. Louis Stars	12	14	6	47	59	130	5,388
Dallas Tornado	2	26	4	28	109	52	2,929

Pacific Division	W	L	T	GF	GA	Pts	Avg Att
San Diego Toros	18	8	6	65	38	186	4,245
Oakland Clippers	18	8	6	71	38	185	3,700
Los Angeles Wolves	11	13	8	55	52	139	2,441*
Vancouver Royals	12	15	5	51	60	136	6,197

^League best, *League worst

== NASL All-Stars ==
First Team	Position	Second Team
(Socialist Federal Republic of Yugoslavia) Mirko Stojanović, Oakland	G	(Wales) Vic Rouse, Atlanta
(England) Mel Scott, Oakland	D	(Denmark) John Worbye, Washington
(Socialist Federal Republic of Yugoslavia) Momcilio Gavric, Oakland	D	(England) John Cocking, Atlanta
(Socialist Federal Republic of Yugoslavia) David Davidovic, Oakland	M	(England) Dennis Viollet, Baltimore
(England) Ron Crisp, San Diego	M	(Socialist Federal Republic of Yugoslavia) Milan Čop, Oakland
(Argentina) Ruben Navarro, Cleveland	M	(England) Tony Knapp, Los Angeles
(Poland) Janusz Kowalik, Chicago	F	(Argentina) Victorio Casa, Washington
(Uruguay) Pepe Fernandez, San Diego	F	(Brazil) Mario Baesso, Oakland
(Denmark) Jorgen Kristensen, Detroit	F	(Republic of Ireland) Eric Barber, Kansas City
(Poland) Casey Frankiewicz, St. Louis	F	(Brazil) Vavá, San Diego
(United States) Ilija Mitic, Oakland	F	(Spain) Enrique Mateos, Cleveland

== Playoffs ==
=== Bracket ===
Conference Finals (2-match aggregate)
E1	Atlanta Chiefs	1	2	3
E2	Cleveland Stokers	1	1	2
W1	San Diego Toros	1	1	2
W2	Kansas City Spurs	1	0	1

NASL Final 1968 (2-match aggregate)
E1	Atlanta Chiefs	0	3	3
W1	San Diego Toros	0	0	0

=== Conference finals ===
Higher seed	Aggregate	Lower seed	First leg	Second leg	Attendance
Atlanta Chiefs	3–2	Cleveland Stokers	1–1	2–1 (OT)	September 11 • Cleveland Stadium • 3,431; September 14 • Atlanta Stadium • 6,645
San Diego Toros	2–1	Kansas City Spurs	1–1	1–0 (2OT)	September 11 • Municipal Stadium • 5,042; September 16 • Balboa Stadium • 6,271

=== NASL Final 1968 ===
Eastern Champion	Aggregate	Western Champion	First leg	Second leg	Attendance
Atlanta Chiefs	3–0	San Diego Toros	0–0	3–0	September 21 • Balboa Stadium • 9,360; September 28 • Atlanta Stadium • 14,994

==== First leg ====
September 21

San Diego Toros	0–0	Atlanta Chiefs
	Report

Balboa Stadium, San Diego, California
Attendance: 9,360
Referee: Reg Clark (Canada)

==== Second leg ====
September 28

Atlanta Chiefs	3–0	San Diego Toros
Peter McParland (22:34); Delroy Scott (42:53); Kaizer Motaung (79:50)	Report

Atlanta Stadium, Atlanta, Georgia
Attendance: 14,994
Referee: Jim Carr (USA)

1968 NASL Champions: Atlanta Chiefs

== Post season awards ==
- Most Valuable Player: (Poland) Janusz Kowalik, Chicago
- Coach of the year: (Wales) Phil Woosnam, Atlanta
- Rookie of the year: (South Africa) Kaizer Motaung, Atlanta

== Average home attendance ==
Team	Average
Kansas City Spurs	8,510
Washington Whips	6,318
Vancouver Royals	6,197
Atlanta Chiefs	5,626
New York Generals	5,606
St. Louis Stars	5,388
Toronto Falcons	5,284
Cleveland Stokers	4,305
Detroit Cougars	4,183
San Diego Toros	4,137
Baltimore Bays	4,112
Boston Beacons	3,992
Oakland Clippers	3,690
Houston Stars	3,246
Dallas Tornado	2,929
Los Angeles Wolves	2,396
Chicago Mustangs	2,379
