= Ron Crisp =

English footballer

Personal information
- Full name: Ronald James Crisp
- Date of birth: 24 September 1938 (age 88)
- Place of birth: Datchet, England
- Position: Utility player

Senior career*
Years	Team	Apps	(Gls)
- Dulwich Hamlet
1959–1960	Luton Town	0	(0)
1960–1965	Watford	89	(14)
1965–1966	Brentford	18	(0)
1967	Los Angeles Toros	17	(1)
1968	San Diego Toros	32	(5)
1969	Orient	0	(0)
1969	Durban Spurs		
1970	Bloemfontein City		
1970–1971	Durban United		
1972	East London United		
1974	Port Elizabeth City		

Managerial career
- Glenwood
- –1973: Juventus
- 1993–1994: Expro 91
- * Club domestic league appearances and goals

Ronald James Crisp (born 24 September 1938) is an English former footballer who was adept in a variety of positions. He played in England, the United States and South Africa.

== Club career ==
=== Early years ===
Crisp began his career as an amateur at Isthmian League club Dulwich Hamlet and secured a move to the Football League with Luton Town in November 1959. He departed in 1960, having failed to make an appearance.

=== Watford ===
Crisp signed for Third Division club Watford in July 1960. Operating initially as a forward, he had a slow start to his career at Vicarage Road, making just seven appearances and scoring one goal during the 1960–61 season and deputising for Cliff Holton. Crisp broke into the team in the following campaign and was top scorer with 13 goals in all competitions. He scored a memorable goal in a match against Port Vale in February 1962, scoring within 30 seconds of the kickoff after running from the centre circle into the penalty area. Crisp fell out of the team again during the 1962–63 season, but was given a chance at wing half by incoming manager Bill McGarry in the following campaign, making 26 league appearances. Crisp departed Watford in 1965, having made 102 appearances and scored 17 goals during his time with the Hornets.

=== Brentford ===
Crisp signed for Third Division club Brentford in August 1965 for a £2,000 fee. He failed to break into the team, making just 22 appearances and scoring one goal before departing in December 1966. He spent much of his time with the reserve team, winning the 1966–67 London Challenge Cup with the team.

=== United States ===
Crisp moved to the United States in 1967 to sign for National Professional Soccer League club Los Angeles Toros. Despite a bottom place finish for the Toros in the Western Division, Crisp had a successful 1967 season, making 17 appearances, scoring one goal and was named the league's Player of the Year. The franchise relocated to San Diego the following year and transferred to the new North American Soccer League. Crisp was once again a standout player, making 32 appearances, scoring five goals and helping the club to the Pacific Division title. The team went all the way to the NASL Final, but were beaten 3–0 on aggregate by Atlanta Chiefs. Crisp was named in the 1968 All-Star team.

=== Return to England ===
Crisp returned to England in March 1969 to go on trial at Third Division club Orient. He signed a contract, but bought himself out of it and departed the club without making an appearance.

=== South Africa ===
Crisp moved to South Africa in 1969 to join National Football League club Durban Spurs. He had a good first season, winning the league title. Crisp moved to Bloemfontein City in 1970, but transferred mid-season to Durban Spurs United, with whom he remained until 1971. Crisp had spells with East London United and Port Elizabeth City in 1972 and 1974 respectively.

== Coaching career ==
After winding down his playing career in South Africa, Crisp served as coach of Glenwood, Juventus (two spells) and Expro 81.

== Representative career ==
While with Watford, Crisp played for the Hertfordshire representative team.

== Personal life ==
Crisp lives in South Africa and is a sales executive for an office machine company in Durban. He has been married twice and has two sons and one daughter.

== Career statistics ==
Appearances and goals by club, season and competition
Club	Season	League			National cup (Note: Includes FA Cup)		League cup (Note: Includes Football League Cup)		Other		Total	
Club	Season	Division	Apps	Goals	Apps	Goals	Apps	Goals	Apps	Goals	Apps	Goals
Watford	1960–61	Third Division	7	1	0	0	0	0	1 (Note: Appearance in Rigby-Taylor Cup)	0	8	1
Watford	1961–62	Third Division	34	10	2	0	5	3	—		41	13
Watford	1962–63	Third Division	8	0	0	0	0	0	—		8	0
Watford	1963–64	Third Division	26	1	3	0	1	0	—		30	1
Watford	1964–65	Third Division	14	2	0	0	1	0	—		15	2
Watford	Total		89	14	5	0	7	3	1	0	102	17
Brentford	1965–66	Third Division	11	0	1	0	0	0	—		12	0
Brentford	1966–67	Fourth Division	7	0	0	0	3	1	—		10	1
Brentford	Total		18	0	1	0	3	1	—		22	1
Los Angeles Toros	1967	National Professional Soccer League	17	1	—		—		—		17	1
San Diego Toros	1968	North American Soccer League	32	5	—		—		—		32	5
San Diego Toros	Total		49	6	—		—		—		49	6
Career total			156	20	6	0	10	4	1	0	173	24

== Honours ==
Brentford

- London Challenge Cup: 1966–67

Durban Spurs

- National Football League: 1969

Individual

- National Professional Soccer League Player of the Year: 1967
- North American Soccer League All-Star Team: 1968
