= William Quirós =

Costa Rican footballer (born 1941)

Personal information
- Date of birth: 10 October 1941 (age 85)
- Place of birth: Alajuela, Costa Rica
- Height: 5 ft 5 in (1.65 m)
- Position: Forward

Youth career
- 1954–1959: Deportivo Saprissa

Senior career*
Years	Team	Apps	(Gls)
1959–1966	Deportivo Saprissa		
1967–1968	Oakland Clippers	31	(3)
1969	Kansas City Spurs		
1970–1973	Alajuelense		
1973–1974	UCR		
1975	San Jose Earthquakes (indoor)	2	(0)
1975	San Jose Earthquakes	1	(0)
- Anderlecht

International career
1963–1968	Costa Rica	21+	(4+)
- * Club domestic league appearances and goals

William Quirós (born 10 October 1941) is a Costa Rican former footballer who played as a forward.

== Club career ==
Quirós started his career in the youth teams of Deportivo Saprissa in 1954, before making his debut five years later. At Saprissa, he helped them win four league titles. In early 1967, Oakland Clippers administrator Aca Obradović travelled to Costa Rica to scout players, where he discovered both Quirós and teammate Edgar Marín. Both players were given US dollars by Obradović, in order to pay for their own releases before signing for the Clippers. During the 1969 North American Soccer League season, while at the Kansas City Spurs, he was included in that year's all-star team as he helped the team win the league.

In 1970, he returned to Costa Rica with Alajuelense, before later joining UCR in 1973. In 1975, he returned to the United States to play for the San Jose Earthquakes. Additionally, he played for Anderlecht in Belgium.

== International career ==
Quirós represented the Costa Rica national team between 1963 and 1968, playing at both the 1963 and 1965 CONCACAF Championships. He also represented Costa Rica in 1966 and 1970 FIFA World Cup qualification, notably scoring a hat-trick against Jamaica in the final round of 1966 qualification.

== Personal life ==
By 2003, he was married and with three kids. Additionally, he worked at a duty-free shop at Juan Santamaría International Airport.
