= Charlie Williams (footballer, born 1944) =

Maltese footballer (1944–2026)

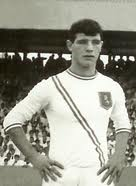
- Williams in 1963

Personal information
- Date of birth: 15 February 1944
- Place of birth: Valletta, Malta
- Date of death: May 2026 (aged 82)
- Position: Midfielder

Youth career
- Valletta

Senior career*
Years	Team	Apps	(Gls)
1961–1967	Valletta	65	(9)
1967	Pittsburgh Phantoms	25	(0)
1968	San Diego Toros	2	(0)
1968	Dallas Tornado	3	(0)
1968–1969	Rochester Lancers	29	(0)
1970	Syracuse Scorpions	6	(0)
1971	Syracuse Suns	10	(0)
1972	Boston Astros	9	(0)
1973–1974	Syracuse Suns	19	(0)
1975	German Sports Club	22	(9)
1976–1977	Celano Italian Sports Club	37	(12)

International career
1964	Malta	4	(0)
- * Club domestic league appearances and goals

Charles Williams (15 February 1944 – May 2026) was a Maltese professional footballer who played as a midfielder.

== Career ==
Williams learned to play football in the streets of Valletta. At the age of ten, he started playing organized soccer for the Valletta Lilywhites in the Valletta youth league. Williams entered Stella Maris College when he was 11 years old. He represented his school's top team on a regular basis.

During his playing days at the Independence Arena, Williams was discovered by Valletta F.C. officials and was asked to join Valletta at the age of 13 years. At 16 years old, he was the captain of the Valletta minors team, while also playing for the under-21 team and the Valletta reserves team on a regular basis.

The Malta Football Association (MFA) quickly picked him to represent Malta as a youth International. Williams made his Valletta debut at age 17, playing a midfielder. He scored many important goals for Valletta, notably against Norwich City. Another crucial goal was against Floriana FC three minutes from time to give Valletta their 1962–63 championship.

During his stay with Valletta, Williams won the League Championship, Scicluna Cup, FA Trophy and the Cassar Cup. He represented Valletta in European competitions, playing against Dukla Prague in the European Cup and against Real Zaragoza in the UEFA Cup Winners' Cup.

At the age of 18, Williams made his International debut playing for the Malta national team against Italy C. He also played for Malta at the Liguria, Italy tournament where Malta finished in third place, beating Italy and tying the Netherlands.

At the age of 23, first Norwich City, and then the newly formed professional football league in the United States, National Professional Soccer League (NPSL), recruited Williams. In 1967 he decided to sign a professional contract to play in the NPSL, which later became the NASL. He was a pioneer in North American soccer, as he was one of the first players to form the original founding teams. Among the American sides he played for were the Pittsburgh Phantoms, San Diego Toros, Dallas Tornado and Rochester Lancers. He also played for ASL sides Syracuse Scorpions, Syracuse Suns and Boston Astros.

When Williams retired from playing, he decided to take up a coaching career. In 1995, he was voted Best Coach in the State of New York. He also founded and operated his own football academy from 1993 to 2006. Williams retired in 2010.

== Death ==
On 3 May 2026, his former club Valletta announced that Williams had died at the age of 82.

== Sources ==
- Nasljerseys.com: Charles Williams
- Valletta FC Hall of Fame: Charlie Williams
- Timesofmalta.com: Valletta Spoil Canaries 100% Record
- Timesofmalta.com: City Sees Off Blues Challenge
- Timesofmalta.com: Zammit hits hat-trick in 1966 final
- Netnews.com: Charlie Williams soccer career in the United States
