= Miranda Oliveira =

Brazilian footballer

Personal information
- Place of birth: Rio de Janeiro, Brazil
- Height: 5 ft 9 in (1.75 m)
- Position: Forward

Senior career*
Years	Team	Apps	(Gls)
1963–1965	Madureira		
1965–1967	Olimpia		
1967–1968	Águila		
1968–1969	Marathón		
1970	Kansas City Spurs	23	(6)
1971	Washington Darts	20	(5)
1972	Montreal Olympique	7	(0)
Total		50	(11)
- * Club domestic league appearances and goals

Miranda "Clarival" Oliveira is a former Brazilian soccer player who played in the NASL.

== Career statistics ==
=== Club ===
Club	Season	League			Cup		Other		Total	
Club	Season	Division	Apps	Goals	Apps	Goals	Apps	Goals	Apps	Goals
Kansas City Spurs	1970	NASL	23	6	0	0	0	0	23	6
Washington Darts	1971	NASL	20	5	0	0	0	0	20	5
Montreal Olympique	1972	NASL	7	0	0	0	0	0	7	0
Career total			50	11	0	0	0	0	50	11
