= Clive Toye =

British-American soccer coach and sportswriter

Clive Roy Toye
- Born: 23 November 1932 (age 93); Plymouth, England
- Occupations: Journalist, author, football administrator
- Known for: general manager of US soccer franchises

Clive Roy Toye (born 23 November 1932) is a British-American soccer coach and sportswriter.

== Early life ==
Toye was born in Plymouth, United Kingdom, to Thomas Roy Toye (1906–65) and Irene Turner.

== Sportswriting ==
Toye was a sportswriter for the Express and Echo newspaper in Exeter, and later Chief Sports Writer for the Daily Express.

In March 2016, Toye began writing a column for Soccerama, a British soccer quarterly magazine.

== NASL ==
In 1967, Toye went to the United States to become general manager of the Baltimore Bays and later was first general manager of the New York Cosmos of the North American Soccer League, bringing the Brazilian star Pelé to the US and helping to popularise soccer in America. He provided colour commentary for CBS's broadcast of the 1974 NASL final between Los Angeles Aztecs and the Miami Toros and for both legs of the 1968 Finals between the San Diego Toros and the Atlanta Chiefs. In addition to the Bays (1967–1968) and Cosmos (1971–1977), he was also the Chicago Sting's president from 1978 to 1979, and the chairman of the Toronto Blizzard from 1980 to 1984.

In the 1984 finals Toye's Blizzard would face his former club the Chicago Sting. A few weeks earlier the Sting had announced they were leaving the NASL after the playoffs concluded. Just before the finals got underway, Toye made some comments regarding his hope for an all-Canadian finals that were taken by some in the media to be "anti-Sting" instead. Toye, who himself was part of the fight to keep the league afloat, appeared to have defused the situation during a half-time interview of Game 1 of the finals in Chicago. However, in the immediate aftermath of the Sting's championship clinching victory in Game 2, his actions appeared to be those of a sore loser. He refused to honour the long-standing tradition of entering the winning locker room to congratulate the victors. Toye followed that up by taking verbal jabs at Chicago coach Willy Roy and star Karl-Heinz Granitza in the press, referring to them as "cheats" and the Sting as "unworthy champions" among other things. He also said that Toronto did not deserve to lose. Not surprisingly, Granitza responded in-kind. In the end, the lack of sportsmanship mattered little, as Chicago walked off into the sunset with the trophy and the NASL ceased operations the following year with Toye as its interim president.

After the sudden death of Howard J. Samuels, Toye was appointed interim president of the NASL in December 1984. The league ceased operations the following Spring.

He was inducted to the National Soccer Hall of Fame in the United States in 2003.

He became a senior consultant for CONCACAF, and in 2009 was inducted into that organisation's Hall of Fame.

== Misc ==
Regarding the use of the word "soccer", Toye noted that even English people called the game "soccer" interchangeably with "football" until the second half of the 20th century. "A quirk of British culture is the permanent need to familiarize names by shortening them. ... Toye [said] 'They took the third, fourth and fifth letters of Association and called it SOCcer.'"
