= Poinsettia Bowl (1952–1955) =

American football bowl game between military teams

Poinsettia Bowl (defunct)
- Stadium: Balboa Stadium
- Location: San Diego, California
- Operated: 1952–1955

The Poinsettia Bowl was an annual American football bowl game played in San Diego between military service teams during the month of December from 1952 to 1955.

== History ==
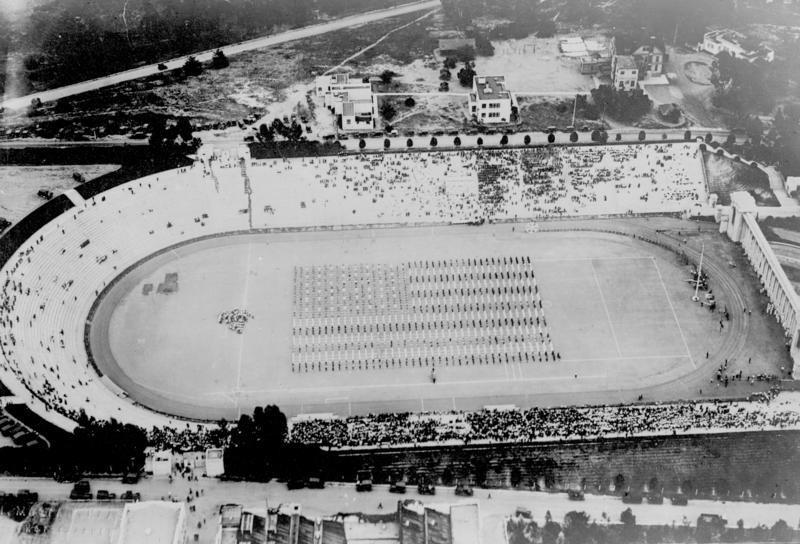
Balboa Stadium in 1932

The Poinsettia Bowl was as an armed forces football championship game, pitting western and eastern military services champions against each other. Plans for the game were announced in late October 1952, with the name coming from "the flower which blooms abundantly in these parts in Winter."

In the inaugural game, the Bolling Air Force Base Generals defeated the San Diego Naval Training Center Bluejackets by a score of 35–14 on December 20, 1952. The game was held at Balboa Stadium in San Diego in a torrential downpour, before hundreds of reluctant sailors, including future College Football Hall of Fame coach Hayden Fry, who were ordered to sit in the stands so that they wouldn't appear empty in the game televised nationally by NBC. Television broadcasters came to terms with the NCAA the next year, making the 1952 Poinsettia Bowl the last nationally televised game between military teams, other than the annual Army–Navy Game.

In 1953, the Fort Ord Warriors, an Army team that featured quarterback Don Heinrich and running backs Ollie Matson and Dave Mann, defeated the Quantico Marines team led by Hayden Fry at quarterback. The Fort Sill Canoneers defeated Bolling Air Force Base in 1954, and the Fort Ord Warriors returned as champions in 1955, defeating Pensacola Naval Air Station in the fourth and final such Poinsettia Bowl. In November 1956, organizers announced the cancellation of that year's game, "because of deployment of the fleet," shortly after the Suez Crisis.

These 1950s games between military teams were unrelated to the later college football bowl game of the same name established in San Diego in 2005.

== Game results ==
Date	Winning team		Losing team		Ref.
December 20, 1952	Bolling AFB (USAF)	35	NTC San Diego (USN)	14	
December 20, 1953	Fort Ord (Army)	55	MCB Quantico (USMC)	19	
December 19, 1954	Fort Sill (Army)	27	Bolling AFB (USAF)	6	
December 17, 1955	Fort Ord (Army)	35	NAS Pensacola (USN)	13	

== Most appearances ==
Rank	Service	Appearances	Record
1	Army	3	3–0
T2	USAF	2	1–1
T2	USN	2	0–2
4	USMC	1	0–1
