= Terry Hanson =

American radio personality

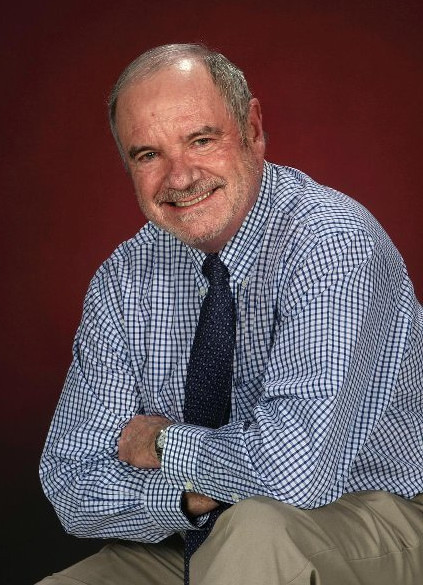
- Born: Terrance Maurice Hanson; June 16, 1947 (age 79); East St. Louis, Illinois, U.S.
- Occupations: Radio personality, sports coach

Terry Hanson (born June 16, 1947) is a semi-retired American radio personality of the John Boy and Billy Big Show, a nationally syndicated radio show. He was the first head of Turner Broadcasting Sports and a National Association of Intercollegiate Athletics (NAIA) National Men's Soccer Coach of the Year. He owns and operates Hanson Enterprises, a company founded in 1995, with experience in Executive Search, a Consultant to Startup Media and Sports Companies, Television Networks, and an Agent for acquiring new media, and negotiating contracts for various TV and Radio content. He owns and operates the Charlotte, North Carolina–based Hanson Enterprises since 1994–present, where he was a consultant for ESPN, Executive Search Firm, Sports Leagues, organizations and also contract negotiations for a number of Television and Radio Announcers and Talent.

== Biography ==
Hanson was born in East St. Louis, Illinois, on June 16, 1947. He attended Assumption high school, and he earned a bachelor's degree in education from St. Benedict's College (now Benedictine College) in Atchison, Kansas, in 1968; two years later, in 1970, Hanson earned his master's degree in education from Southeast Missouri State University in Cape Girardeau, Missouri, where he also was an Assistant Baseball Coach. After this, he began his professional career at Benedictine College in Atchison, Kansas, where he was the head coach in both soccer and baseball, and he was named the National Soccer Coach of the Year in 1974 by the NAIA.

Hanson spent four summers as an associate scout for two major league baseball teams: the Philadelphia Phillies and the San Diego Padres. He also spent five seasons as a senior executive for three North American Soccer League teams from 1976-1981: the Rochester Lancers, the Washington Diplomats, and the Atlanta Chiefs.

From 1980 to 1984, Hanson worked as a Senior Executive at Turner Broadcasting . In 1982, Hanson, Robert Wussler, and Russ Potts successfully outbid CBS to air what was dubbed "The Game of the Decade" on Turner Network Television—a college basketball game pitting The University of Virginia against the Georgetown Hoyas in a matchup which featured the two biggest stars in college basketball at the time, Ralph Sampson and Patrick Ewing. This was an important step for sports broadcasting on cable television, as high-profile sporting event broadcasts had always been featured on major networks prior to this. it was also the first use of the name "Turner Network Television" (or TNT). Hanson was also responsible for other programming properties, acquisitions and ongoing management accomplishments for TBS Sports, namely: Atlanta Braves, Atlanta Hawks, inaugural NCAA College Football prime time package, entrees into the NBA, NASCAR, NASL, SEC Football, College Basketball, PGA Tour, Various Sports Documentaries and New Studio Programming.

In an article in The Sporting News in May 2017, there is an article outlining the genesis of Ted Turner's idea to have Hanson and Robert Wussler create a four-hour baseball documentary on what typically happens during any baseball season. This Emmy and Ace Award-winning documentary followed the 1982 season of the Turner-owned Atlanta Braves. It was entitled “It’s A Long Way to October” and was narrated by legendary baseball announcer Red Barber, produced by Glenn Diamond and Hanson was the Executive Producer.

From 1984 to 1991, Hanson was the PGA Tour Vice President of Communications and Broadcasting and President of PGA Tour Productions. He also negotiated contracts for major network television golf coverage and oversaw the Public Relations Department.

Hanson was hired in 1991 as President of the Raycom Sports events division, which included the Blockbuster Bowl college football event and the Diet Pepsi Tournament of Champions, later titled by Harris Teeter, Food Lion and Hardee's, which was a high-profile college basketball tournament.

He operates Hanson Enterprises, a Sports Management firm from 1994–present. He has represented sports leagues, new start-up sports companies, and has consulted for ESPN for a prime time professional golf event.

Terry and the late John Feinstein, long time friend and renowned sports author, commissioned a screen play of his best seller: Caddy For Life: The Bruce Edwards Story. Hanson engaged The William Morris Agency, in conjunction with Matt Damon's and Ben Affleck's production company, LivePlanet. The work was eventually produced in documentary format for the Golf Channel.

From 1995-2020 Hanson was a consultant for the syndicated radio morning show, The John Boy and Billy Big Show. He was also an on air personality with them from 2013-2020.

He was a TV personality, doing professional soccer in Washington, DC and Atlanta and has done television color analyst work in college basketball.

== Medical intervention ==
In 2005, Charlotte Observer writer Michael Gordon wrote an article titled, “Life, Death and Terry Hanson.” In the article, Gordon documents four separate times in Hanson's life when he was in the right place at the right time to come to a person's rescue:

- 1970 – While Hanson was the baseball and soccer coach at St. Benedict's College in Atchison, Kansas, he performed mouth-to-mouth resuscitation on a retired Army officer, who had collapsed in front of Hanson's office. At the age of 23, Hanson was unable to save his life.
- 1972 – Hanson's friend, Ed Ireland, went missing on a Saturday night after closing the Knights of Columbus in Atchison, Kan with Hanson and friend Richard Dyer. The following Monday, Hanson, Dyer and Ireland's brother went searching for their friend. They stopped at every skid mark on a 20-mile stretch of highway. By a stroke of luck, Dyer slipped down an embankment and spotted Ireland pinned underneath his car in the mud.
- 1991 – Lloyd Cox, 86 at the time, collapsed at a baseball game. Nearby, Hanson rushed over and performed CPR on Cox for ten minutes. Afterward a paramedic told onlookers had Hanson not stepped into action, they would have watched Cox die.
- 2005 – Hanson was at a lunch meeting with friend Andy Abdow, when Abdow collapsed at the restaurant from a heart attack. Hanson performed mouth-to-mouth resuscitation while two other men assisted; Abdow was later stabilized by repeated shocks from a defibrillator at a hospital where he stayed for 15 days.

== Semi-Retired ==
In January 2020, he and his wife, Patti, semi-retired to Eureka, Missouri, a suburb of their native St Louis, to be near their children and grandchildren.

In December 2021, Hanson had a cornea transplant at Washington University to repair a long-standing eye issue called Keratoconus.

In May 2022 he was inducted into the St Louis Sports Hall of Fame in the category of Sports Administration.

On September, 2022 Dan Caesar, sports media writer for the St Louis Post-Dispatch, quoted Hanson on the national telecast of St Louis Cardinals Albert Pujols hitting his 700th career Home Run. He was very critical of Major League Baseball airing that game exclusively on an Apple TV Friday Night Game of the Week. Hanson cited his disappointment that the exclusive telecast could not be seen by numerous Cardinals viewers who were not able to access the fee-based Apple TV app.

In January 2024, he returned to do a weekly feature on The John Boy & Billy Big Show, a morning radio program that was syndicated into 44 markets, in 16 states by Premiere radio Networks. He called in 48- 5 minute radio pieces, that he last did in 2019 called Sports Briefs, that aired weekly. The program first started in 1986 and they recently retired in 2026 after a 39 year radio career.

In 2025, Vinny Hardy, a Tennessee based media, radio veteran, presently doing a podcast for Kentucky Sports named BLEAV IN KENTUCKY, was promoted to Vice President for Special Projects for Hanson Enterprises. The Company has started engaging in searches for agreements to aid College Student Athletes with various brands, for Name Image Likeness (NIL) deals.

He is presently representing the TV Voice of the St. Louis Cardinals, Chip Caray, for endorsements. Veteran sports marketer, Barney Hinkle, is also on-board to negotiate the agreements.

In 2025, Caray and Hanson were named Ambassadors of the Veterans group Folds of Honor, that pays tuitions and expenses for the children of Veterans, and EMT fallen heroes.

On May 7, 2026, Hanson's former boss, Ted Turner passed away at age 87. Website Front Row Soccer.com printed a story written by Michael Lewis, on Hanson's life with Turner.
