= Leonel Conde =

Uruguayan footballer (1937-2001)

Personal information
- Date of birth: 1937
- Place of birth: Uruguay
- Date of death: 2001 (aged 63–64)
- Height: 6 ft 2 in (1.88 m)
- Position: Goalkeeper

Senior career*
Years	Team	Apps	(Gls)
1960	Cerro		
1960–1965	Atletico Morelia		
1967–1968	Oakland Clippers	8	(0)
1969–1970	Kansas City Spurs	39	(0)
1970–1971	PEC Zwolle		
1971	Washington Darts	24	(0)
- * Club domestic league appearances and goals

Leonel Conde (1937–2001) was a Uruguayan professional footballer who played as a goalkeeper in Uruguay, Mexico, Netherlands, and the United States.

== Career ==
Conde played for Cerro and Mexican club Atletico Morelia, before moving to the United States to play with the Oakland Clippers, the Kansas City Spurs, and the Washington Darts. In the 1969 season he was a member of the NASL 1st All-Star Team. He also played in the Netherlands with PEC Zwolle.
