= Victorio Casa =

Argentine footballer

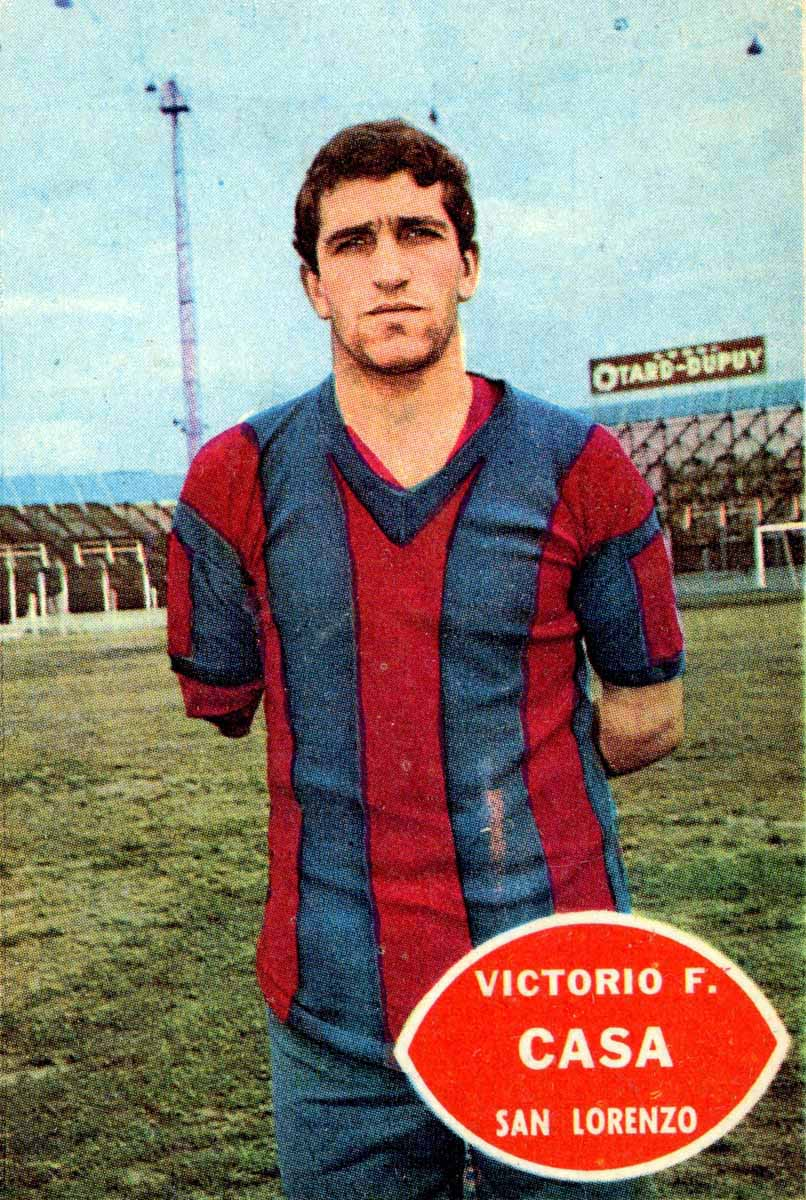
- Casa on a 1965 collectible card

Personal information
- Full name: Victorio Francisco Casa
- Date of birth: 28 October 1943
- Date of death: 6 June 2013 (aged 69)
- Position: Forward

Senior career*
| Years | Team | Apps | (Gls) |
| 1962–1966 | San Lorenzo | 72 | (5) |
| 1966–1967 | Platense | | |
| 1968 | Washington Whips | 31 | (5) |
| 1970 | Washington Darts | 17 | (3) |
| 1971 | Quilmes (MdP) | ? | (?) |

International career
| 1964 | Argentina | 0 | (0) |
- * Club domestic league appearances and goals

Victorio Francisco Casa (28 October 1943 – 6 June 2013) was an Argentine professional footballer who played as a forward for San Lorenzo in the Argentine Primera División and in the United States with the Washington Whips and Washington Darts in the first North American Soccer League (NASL).

He is the first player in American professional soccer history (and only player in NASL history) to play with one arm; he had lost his right arm in a freak shooting accident before coming to the U.S.

== Club career ==
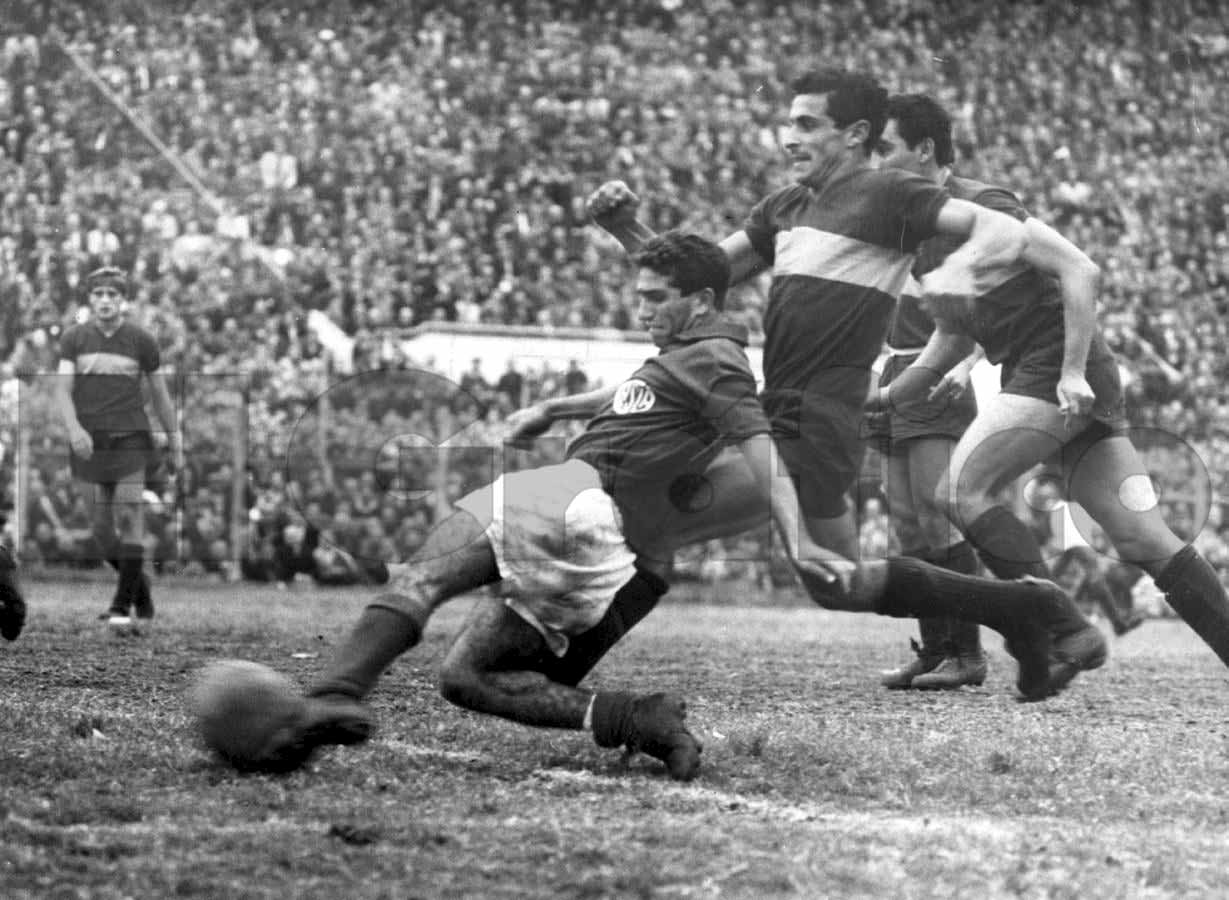
Casa controlling the ball in a match v Boca Juniors

Casa began his domestic professional career in Buenos Aires, playing with Club Deportivo Norte in his hometown of Mar del Plata. He moved to San Lorenzo in 1962.

On April 11, 1965, Casa stopped his brand new car (a Valiant II) at the Escuela Superior de Mecánica de la Armada, then a military restricted area. Casa was shot by the soldier on guard without any prior warning. The incident resulted in the loss of his right arm. Only 45 days after almost being killed, Casa returned to the field in a match v Banfield. His appearance earned him the nickname Manco ("one-armed man").

"A taxi driver recognized me and took me to Pirovano Hospital. The doctor told me, 'Kid, it's nothing.' 'Nothing? My hand's in my hand, man.' They anesthetized me. I thought I was dead. The next day, the doctor told me, 'You still have your arm.' He'd put a bandage on it, and I picked at it. How could I still have it?"

— Casa talking about the loss of his arm.

After his tenure on San Lorenzo, Casa signed with Platense in 1966, although he did not play any official match, staying there through 1967.

In 1968, Casa joined the recently formed North American Soccer League, signing with the Washington Whips franchise in Washington, D.C. Playing as a forward, he got into 31 games and scored 5 goals. When the club folded after a season, he returned to Argentina to play in 1969. After some restructuring, the NASL brought the Washington Darts of the American Soccer League into the league as their new D.C. club for the 1970 season. Casa signed with the Darts that year, and in 17 games scored three goals.

Upon Casa's return to the NASL in 1970, the New York Times referred to him in an article as "[t]he highest paid soccer player in the United States ... [he] makes $15,000 a year, speaks no English and has one arm," the result of a 1965 shooting accident, involving the Argentine Navy, that resulted in the amputation of his right arm above the elbow. The piece described him as "[a] man with bright eyes who combs his thick, dark hair straight back." He weighed 145 pounds and was married with two children. In describing the threat to his career after the loss of his arm, Casa said, "Soccer is not played by the arms and I knew I was going to be back."

After his tenure on Washington, Casa returned to Argentina to play for Marplatense C.A. Quilmes, which was his last team before retiring from football.

== International career ==
Casa was part of the Argentina national team that participated in the Taça das Nações held in Brazil in 1964, winning the tournament.

== Post-career ==
Casa refused to make a career as manager or any activity related to the sport, having diverse works such as taxi driver, employee of the casino, and even dog breeder.

He died on 6 June 2013, aged 69, in his hometown, Mar del Plata.
