= Mario Machado =

American journalist (1935–2013)

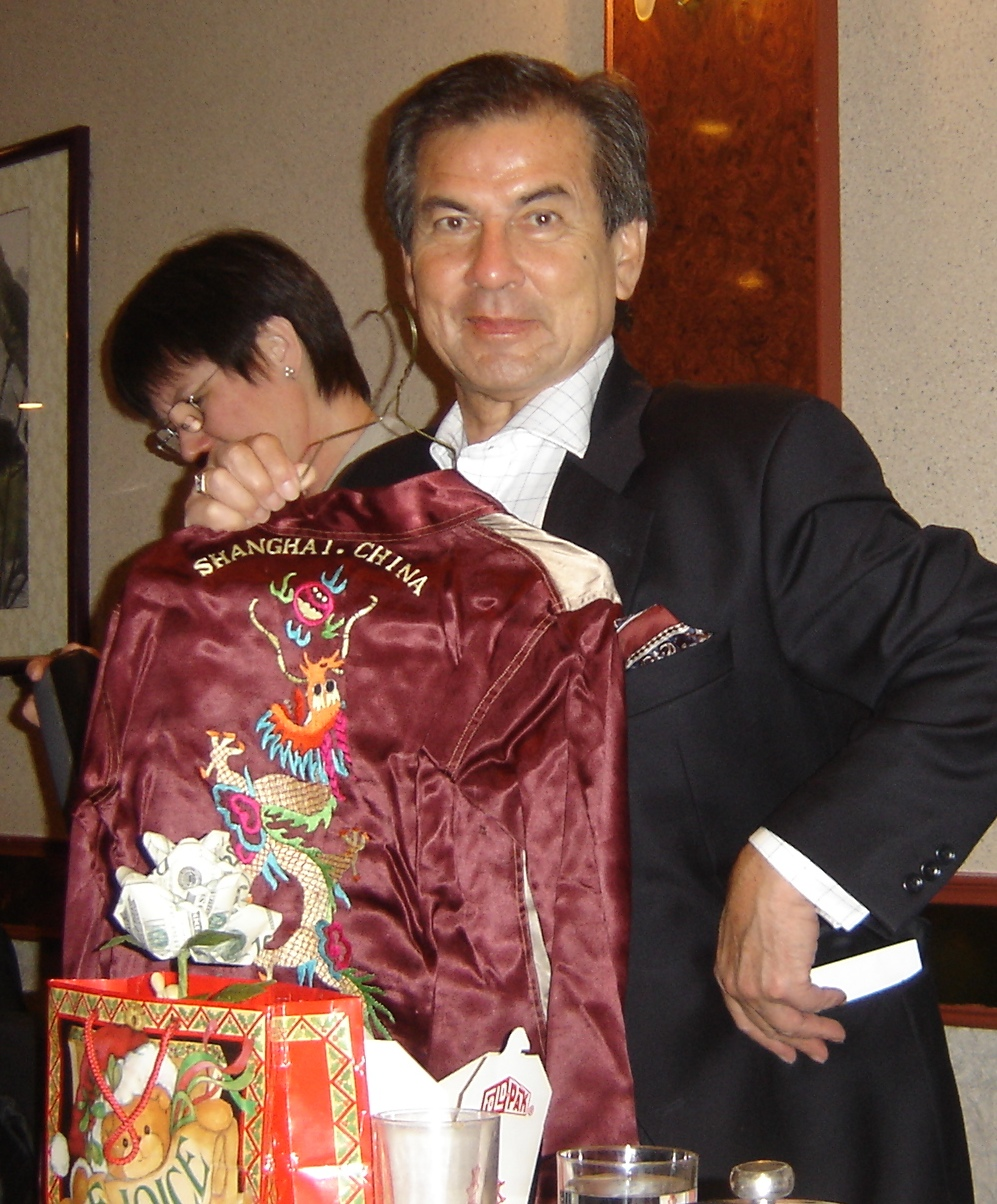
- Machado at his 70th birthday party in 2005
- Born: Mário José de Souza Machado; April 22, 1935; Shanghai, China
- Died: May 4, 2013 (aged 78); West Hills, Los Angeles, U.S.
- Occupations: Television and radio broadcaster, actor
- Spouse: Marie Christine D'Almada Remedios
- Children: 4

Mário Machado (born Mário José de Souza Machado; April 22, 1935 – May 4, 2013) was an American television and radio broadcaster and actor. He made television history when, in 1970, he became the first American of Chinese heritage to be an on-air television news reporter and anchor in Los Angeles and perhaps in the nation.

== Early life ==
Mário José de Souza Machado was born on April 22, 1935, in Shanghai, China. His father, Carlos Jacinto de Lourdes Gouveia Furtado Machado, was a vice-chancellor of the Portuguese Consulate in Shanghai, and his mother, Chinese-Portuguese Maria Teresa de Sousa, was a homemaker.

After studying for two years at St. John's Military Academy in Los Angeles at the age of 11, Machado's education was obtained at the British Thomas Hanbury School, St. Francis Xavier College in Shanghai, and a business college in Hong Kong. He emigrated to Seattle in 1956, and became a US citizen in 1965.

== Career ==
Before entering the broadcasting field, Machado worked in management for IBM Corporation.

=== Television ===
Machado's television career began in 1967, when he signed on at KHJ-TV (now KCAL-TV) as an on-air news reporter, a first for a Chinese American. The following year he began working as a color commentator at CBS owned-and-operated KNXT (now KCBS-TV) in Los Angeles. In 1969, he became the first Consumer Affairs reporter in the nation at KNXT. He became a regular reporter in 1970 on the CBS nightly broadcast, The Big News, which was Los Angeles' most popular newscast in the 1960s. He worked there with news icon, Jerry Dunphy.

In the early and mid-1970s, Machado hosted the daily news and interview show, Noontime, which aired for seven years on KNXT.

In 1982, he was the announcer of the short-lived syndicated game show called That **** Quiz Show (That Awful! Quiz Show), hosted by Greg & John Rice.

As host of the medical investigation show, Medix, which ran for 208 episodes over eight seasons, he was nominated three times for "Outstanding Achievement as Host." The show garnered several Emmys and Emmy nominations.

When not hosting his own talk shows or anchoring the news, Machado often played the part of a reporter, news anchor, or himself on many popular television programs.

=== Acting ===
On the big screen, as well, Machado often portrayed a news anchor or reporter, notably as Casey Wong in the three RoboCop films. Among the other notable films in which he plays the reporter are Brian's Song (1971), Oh, God! (1977), The Concorde ... Airport '79 (1979), Rocky III (1982), and Scarface (1983).

Machado also appeared as himself in the Banacek episode "Detour to Nowhere" (1972), The Brady Bunch (1974), Blue Thunder (1983), Without Warning (1994), and An Alan Smithee Film: Burn Hollywood Burn (1997).

Machado's last acting role was the 1998 episode "The Nature of Nurture" of the television series Beverly Hills, 90210.

Machado's distinctive voice can also be heard on a number of films for Retinitis Pigmentosa International's TheatreVision, which provides blind audiences with a description of what is happening on the screen.

=== Sports ===
As a star collegiate athlete and former soccer player, Machado was able to indulge his love for soccer by serving as the English language commentator at four FIFA World Cup soccer championships: in Mexico (1970), Germany (1974), Argentina (1978) and Spain (1982) for audiences throughout North America, and also at the 1984 Olympic Games.

He was the Voice of Soccer for the CBS Television Network in 1968 and in 1976, covering the North American Soccer League (NASL). He did the television play-by-play of both legs for CBS' broadcast of the NASL's first championship. He hosted the weekly soccer program, The Best of the World Cup for the Spanish International Network. Machado hosted Star Soccer from England on Public Broadcasting Service (PBS) Public television stations for six years.

He served as Commissioner of the American Soccer League in 1981.

Between 1976 and 1984 he published Soccer Corner Magazine, for fellow enthusiasts of the sport..

When the English Premier League was formed in 1992, Machado was the narrator of the weekly Prem highlights program produced in England and syndicated nationally across the United States.

He was one of the founding members of AYSO with his friend Hans Stierle, and in 1971 he helped change AYSO policy to allow girls to play. In recognition for his contributions to the sport, Machado was inducted into the AYSO Hall of Fame in 1999.

=== Old China Hands ===
As president of MJM Communications, Machado produced numerous special events including the Beverly Hills St. Patrick's Day Parades of 1985 and 1986, the Pet Parade, and the Festival of Nations for Los Angeles County's 150th anniversary, and in 1986, he produced the first official Spanish language coverage of the Rose Parade for Telemundo/KVEA.

An event that has produced results that are still ongoing is the Old China Hands Reunion of 1996. Between September 3 and 9 of that year 1,100 former residents of China from all corners of the world gathered at MGM Grand Las Vegas hotel in Las Vegas for a reunion that has been called by attendees the biggest and best Old China Hands Reunion.

A large collection of oral histories of individuals who left China in the 1940s and 1950s were gathered by Machado and co-producer, Barbara Egyud, at this event, in collaboration with the University of Nevada, Las Vegas History Department. These oral histories formed the nucleus of the Old China Hands Archive housed at the University Library at California State University, Northridge. Robert Gohstand, a retired Geography professor at CSUN and Shanghai classmate of Machado, recognized the importance of saving these stories for posterity, and now heads the Old China Hands Archive at California State University, Northridge which was inaugurated in 2002.

== Personal life ==
Machado's marriage to Marie Christine D'Almada Remedios produced four children.

Machado died on May 4, 2013, at age 78, in West Hills, Los Angeles.

== Awards and honors ==
Machado's work on television has earned him eight Emmy Awards and ten nominations. His last Emmy was for his work on the television special U.S. Citizenship: A Dream Come True, which was broadcast in over 120 countries.

- Howard Blakeslee Award
- San Francisco's Interceptor Award
- Mario Machado Day proclaimed by Mayor Benjamin Norton for December 4, 1983, in Beverly Hills, California.
- Honorary mayor of Granada Hills for eight years.
- Los Angeles Commissioner of Cultural Affairs.
- Was one of the founding members of Nosotros, founded by Ricardo Montalbán in 1970 to improve the image of Latino actors.
- President Ronald Reagan appointed Machado to the Child Safety Partnership in 1986.
- 1987 commendation by Los Angeles County for "outstanding work on behalf of women, children and families."
- Announcer for Pope John Paul II Mass at Dodger Stadium
- Rode on the "Icons of Freedom" float in the 1988 Tournament of Roses Parade celebrating the U.S. Constitution. He rode with Mickey Mouse, astronaut Buzz Aldrin, boxing champion Muhammad Ali, and others.
- Honda Motors established the Mario J. Machado Scholarships in 1991
- Induction in 1999 to the AYSO Hall of Fame:
- Served as Grand Marshal of numerous Los Angeles Chinatown's Chinese New Year Parades.
- Honored for his contributions by Chinese Historical Society 1999.
- John Anson Ford Humanitarian Award in 1994
- Cited for advancing role of Latinos in media
- 1996 Humanitarian of the Year Award for more than 2,800 hours of service in 27 years.
- Carried the Olympic Flame through downtown Los Angeles prior to the 2004 Athens Olympic Games.

== Filmography ==
Year	Title	Role
1971	Brian's Song	Reporter #1
1977	Oh, God!	TV Reporter
1979	The Concorde ... Airport '79	Reporter #1
1982	Rocky III	Interviewer
1983	Scarface	Interviewer
1983	Blue Thunder	Himself
1985	St. Elmo's Fire	Kim Sung Ho
1987	RoboCop	Casey Wong
1988	Jack's Back	Anchorman
1988	Dead Man Walking	Himself
1990	RoboCop 2	Casey Wong
1993	RoboCop 3	Casey Wong
1995	Casas de fuego	Cadaver
1997	An Alan Smithee Film: Burn Hollywood Burn	Himself
