= Paul Gardner (journalist) =

American soccer journalist and author (born 1930)

- Born: May 15, 1930 (age 96); Ramsgate, England
- Occupation: Writer
- Writing career
- Genre: Journalism
- Notable works: Nice Guys Finish Last: Sports and American Life The Simplest Game: The Intelligent Fan’s Guide to the World of Soccer
- Website: www.socceramerica.com/author/paul-gardner

Paul Gardner (born May 15, 1930 in Ramsgate, England) is an American soccer journalist and author. He has written more than one thousand columns for Soccer America. He covered American soccer for England's World Soccer magazine since 1973. His books include The Simplest Game, Nice Guys Finish Last and SoccerTalk: Life Under the Spell of the Round Ball.

== Career ==
Gardner studied pharmacy at the University of Nottingham and from 1953 through 1959, as a Fellow of the Royal Pharmaceutical Society of Great Britain, worked in London as the assistant editor of Pharmacy Digest.

Gardner immigrated to the United States in 1959 and became the managing editor of a medical magazine. He started covering American sports for British publications in 1961, when his feature on Roger Maris and Mickey Mantle’s pursuit of Babe Ruth's 60-home run record appeared in The Observer.

In 1964, Gardner left the medical magazine and spent two years in Italy before returning to New York, where he discovered a sudden American interest in pro soccer. The United Soccer Association and the National Professional Soccer League – which eventually merged into the NASL – launched in 1967.

The emergence of American pro soccer in the late 1960s coincided with Gardner’s start as a full-time free-lance journalist and he has since covered soccer for publications on both sides of the Atlantic.

Among the publications he has written for are Sports Illustrated, The New York Times, USA Today, The New York Daily News, The Sporting News, The Village Voice, The Times (London), The Guardian (London) and The Independent (London).

Gardner was the color commentator for the first-ever live telecast in the United States of a World Cup final, in 1982 on ABC. He also served as ABC color commentator with legendary Jim McKay of NASL games in 1979-81.

He also did commentary for NBC (1986 World Cup), CBS (NASL) and ESPN (college), and has been a film producer and was the scriptwriter and soccer adviser for the award-winning instructional series Pele: The Master and His Method in 1973.

He has covered nine World Cups and 10 Under-17 World Cups—plus FIFA Under-20 World Cups, Olympics, European Championships and Copa América tournaments.

Gardner, whose columns at one point appeared twice a week at Soccer America, received the 2010 Colin Jose Media Award from the National Soccer Hall of Fame.

== Personal ==
Born in 1930 in England, Gardner attended a Ramsgate school that did not field a soccer team because it was seen as a common, working-class sport. But he and friends created their own team and played games in secret on Saturday mornings.

"In the afternoon many of us played for the school in rugby or field hockey," Gardner wrote in the introduction of his book, SoccerTalk. "Who knows what awful punishment we would have suffered had it got out that we were wasting our adolescent muscle power on soccer only a few hours before school duty called?"

In trying to explain why soccer cast some sort of spell over him, Gardner has written: "I find in soccer what I have found in life: unpredictability, constant surprises, and a fascinating contrariness. It is an activity that suggests it has a mind of its own, one that will tease and disappoint as much as it rewards.

"A little world where players don’t do things you were quite certain they would do, and other players do things you never thought they were capable of. A world where planning goes astray and experts are repeatedly confounded."

== Themes ==
Gardner is well known for his columns criticizing the influences on the game —especially business and coaching—that he sees as threats to the beauty of soccer and its fundamental values as entertainment.

He has persistently called on soccer’s governing bodies to crack down on thuggish play and to reverse the trend of low scoring. Some of his recommendations have been implemented. In 1977, he began writing that the offside rule be changed so that an attacker in line with the last defender would be considered onside. FIFA made the change in 1990. FIFA also adopted his suggestions on how refs deliver second yellow cards, requiring numbers on the front of jerseys, and clarifying in its rulebook the ejection of coaches. For the 1994 World Cup, FIFA implemented his suggestion to require numbers on the front of players' jerseys.

Gardner is a vehement critic of the shootout as a tiebreaker, advocating instead the counting of corner kicks.

He has long been a proponent of the Latin style of play and an unrelenting critic of the United States' historic neglect of Hispanic talent.

== Books ==
- Gardner, Paul (1999). SoccerTalk: Life Under the Spell of the Round Ball. Chicago: Masters Press. ISBN 978-1-57028-231-7.
- Gardner, Paul (1996). The Simplest Game: The Intelligent Fan's Guide to the World of Soccer. New York: Macmillan USA. ISBN 978-0-02-860401-5.
- Gardner, Paul (1974). Nice guys finish last: Sport and American life. London: A. Lane. ISBN 978-0-7139-0728-5.
- Gardner, Paul (1972). Sports illustrated soccer. Philadelphia: Lippincott. ISBN 978-0-397-00908-4. (with Phil Woosnam)
- Pele: The Master and His Method (1973, ASIN, B002IZWFZ8)

== Film ==
- Pele: The Master and His Method Instructional Series (1973) Writer, soccer adviser
- Pele's New World Documentary of Pele's first season with New York Cosmos (1975) Co-producer, co-director, writer

== Television ==
Color Commentator

- NBC: 1986 World Cup (seven games including final)
- NBC: 1984 European Cup final
- NBC: 1984 World Cup qualifying
- ABC: 1982 World Cup final
- ESPN: 1981 NCAA Division I
- ABC: 1979-81 North American Soccer League
- TVS: 1977-78 North American Soccer League
- CBS: 1977 North American Soccer League
- Channel 67-NY: 1974-75 New York Cosmos
