= Novak Tomić =

Serbian footballer

Personal information
- Date of birth: January 7, 1936
- Place of birth: Belgrade, Kingdom of Yugoslavia
- Date of death: July 23, 2003 (aged 67)
- Place of death: Los Angeles, United States
- Position: Defender

Youth career
- Red Star Belgrade

Senior career*
| Years | Team | Apps | (Gls) |
| 1954–1964 | Red Star Belgrade | 94 | (3) |
| 1964–1967 | Hajduk Split | 53 | (1) |
| 1967 | Los Angeles Toros | 14 | (0) |
| 1968 | San Diego Toros | 29 | (3) |
| 1969–1970 | Racing Paris-Neuilly | 5 | (3) |
| Total | | 195 | (10) |

International career
| 1958–1963 | Yugoslavia | 5 | (0) |
- * Club domestic league appearances and goals

Novak Tomić (Serbian Cyrillic: Новак Томић; 7 January 1936 – 23 July 2003) was a Serbian football player. His nickname was Krca.

On the national level he played for Yugoslavia national team (5 matches), and was a participant at the 1958 FIFA World Cup, where he made his senior debut.
