= Alberto Baeza =

Mexican football forward (born 1938)

Personal information
- Full name: Luis Alberto Baeza Mena
- Date of birth: 6 December 1938 (age 87)
- Place of birth: Mexico City, Mexico
- Position: Forward

Senior career*
| Years | Team | Apps | (Gls) |
| 1958–1968 | Club Necaxa | | |
| 1968 | San Diego Toros | 31 | (4) |

International career
| 1962 | Mexico | Called up | |
- * Club domestic league appearances and goals

Luis Alberto Baeza Mena (born 6 December 1938) is a Mexican former football forward who was in Mexico’s squad for the 1962 FIFA World Cup. He also played for Club Necaxa. He played one season in the North American Soccer League for the San Diego Toros.
