= Ataúlfo Sánchez =

Argentine footballer and coach

Personal information
- Full name: Ataúlfo Sánchez Matulic
- Date of birth: 16 March 1934
- Place of birth: Zárate, Argentina
- Date of death: 3 February 2015 (aged 80)
- Place of death: Zárate, Argentina
- Position: Goalkeeper

Senior career*
Years	Team	Apps	(Gls)
- Racing
- América
1968	San Diego Toros	22	(0)
- * Club domestic league appearances and goals

Ataúlfo Sánchez Matulic (16 March 1934 – 3 February 2015) was an Argentine professional football player and coach.

== Career ==
Born in Zárate, Buenos Aires, Sánchez played as a goalkeeper for Racing, América and the San Diego Toros.
