= NASL Final 1968 =

Soccer match

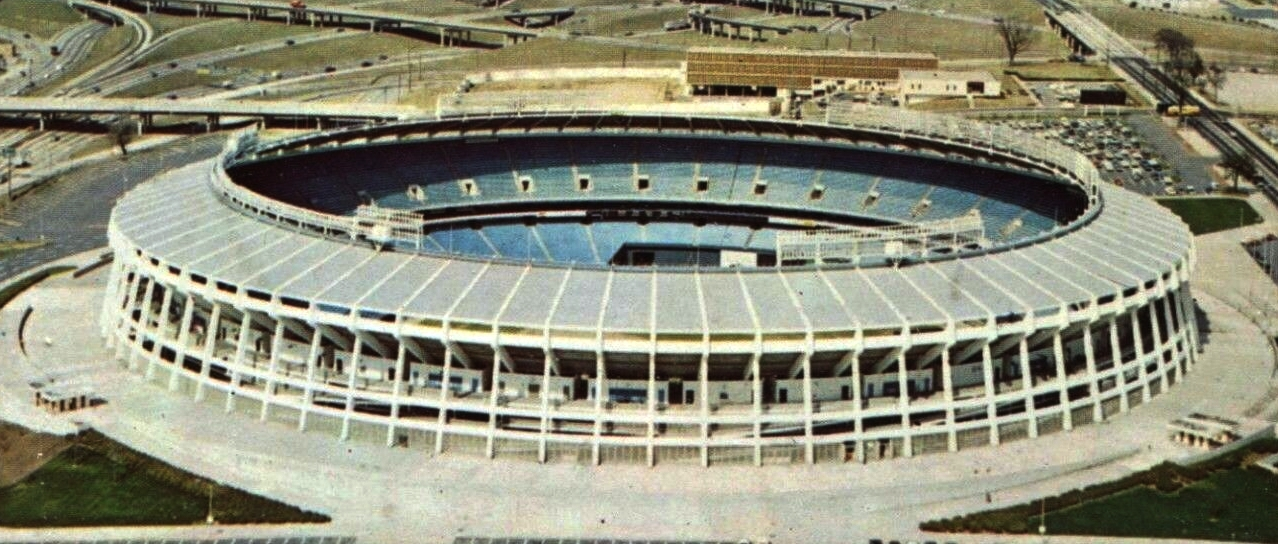
- Atlanta–Fulton County Stadium hosted the second leg of the Final
- Event: NASL Final
San Diego Toros	Atlanta Chiefs
0	3
- on aggregate

First leg
San Diego Toros	Atlanta Chiefs
0	0
- Date: September 21, 1968
- Venue: Balboa Stadium, San Diego, California
- Referee: Reg Clark (Canada)
- Attendance: 9,360

Second leg
Atlanta Chiefs	San Diego Toros
3	0
- Date: September 28, 1968
- Venue: Atlanta Stadium, Atlanta, Georgia
- Referee: Jim Carr (England)
- Attendance: 14,994

NASL Final 1968 was the North American Soccer League's postseason championship final of the 1968 season, and the first championship final for the NASL. The event was contested in a two-game aggregate match between the Atlanta Chiefs and the San Diego Toros. The first leg was played to a, 0–0, draw on September 21, 1968, at Balboa Stadium in San Diego, California. The return leg was contested on September 28, 1968, at Atlanta Stadium in Atlanta, Georgia with the Chiefs winning by the score of 3–0. After the two-day competition was completed, the Atlanta Chiefs held a 3–0 aggregate lead and were crowned the 1968 NASL champions.

== Background ==
The Atlanta Chiefs qualified for the playoffs by virtue of winning the Atlantic Division with 174 points. They faced the Lakes Division champion Cleveland Stokers in a two-game aggregate match for the Eastern Conference championship. The first game was played on September 11 and ended in a, 1–1, draw. The second leg, played on September 14, also finished regulation at 1–1, but the Chiefs were able to score in overtime to win the Eastern Conference title and advance to the finals.

The San Diego Toros qualified for the playoffs by virtue of winning the Pacific Division with 186 points. They faced the Gulf Division champion Kansas City Spurs in a two-game aggregate match for the Western Conference championship. Like the other match played that day, the first leg ended in a, 1–1, draw on September 11. After 90 minutes of regulation the second leg ended with neither team able to score. The September 16 match moved into overtime, and then into a second overtime before Toros' reserve Novak Tomić scored in 118th minute to end it. The victory gave San Diego the Western Conference title and advanced them to the finals.

== Series summary ==
Champion	Runner-up	Game 1	Venue 1	Game 2	Venue 2	Agg.
Atlanta Chiefs	San Diego Toros	0–0	Balboa Stadium	3–0	Atlanta Stadium	3–0

== Match details ==
=== First leg ===
September 21
1:00 p.m. (PST)

San Diego Toros	0–0	Atlanta Chiefs
	Report

Balboa Stadium, San Diego, California
Attendance: 9,360
Referee: Reg Clark (Canada)

Assistant referees:
Artie Wachter
John Greenhalgh

Television: CBS
Announcers: Mario Machado, Clive Toye

=== Second leg ===
September 28
4:00 p.m. (EDT)

Atlanta Chiefs	3–0	San Diego Toros
McParland 23'; Scott 43'; Motaung 80'	Report

Atlanta Stadium, Atlanta, Georgia
Attendance: 14,994
Referee: Jim Carr (England)

Atlanta Chiefs	San Diego Toros

1968 NASL Champions: Atlanta Chiefs
Assistant referees:

Television: CBS
Announcers: Mario Machado, Clive Toye

== Match statistics ==
First Leg
Statistic	San Diego	Atlanta
Goals scored	0	0
Total shots	18	12
Shots on target	2	5
Saves	5	2
Corner kicks	?	?
Fouls	?	?
Yellow cards	?	?
Red cards	0	0

Second Leg
Statistic	San Diego	Atlanta
Goals scored	0	3
Total shots	15	11
Shots on target	1	6
Saves	3	1
Corner kicks	5	7
Fouls	18	33
Yellow cards	0	0
Red cards	0	0

== See also ==
- 1968 North American Soccer League season
