= Pepe Fernández =

Uruguayan footballer (born 1943)

Pepe Fernandez
Personal information
- Full name: Cirilo Fernandez
- Date of birth: July 14, 1943 (age 83)
- Place of birth: Montevideo, Uruguay
- Height: 5 ft 10 in (1.78 m)
- Position: Forward

Youth career
- Club Sport Emelec

Senior career*
| Years | Team | Apps | (Gls) |
| 1967 | Los Angeles Toros | 15 | (4) |
| 1968 | → San Diego Toros | 29 | (30) |
| 1969 | Kansas City Spurs | 16 | (6) |
| 1969–1971 | Go Ahead | 14 | (3) |
| 1972–1974 | HFC Haarlem | 43 | (4) |
| 1974–1976 | Seattle Sounders | 17 | (2) |
| 1976 | Tacoma Tides | 12 | (7) |
| 1977–1978 | HFC Haarlem | 8 | (0) |
| 1981–1982 | Seattle Sounders | 11 | (2) |
| Total | | 165 | (58) |
- * Club domestic league appearances and goals

Cirilo "Pepe" Fernández (born 14 July 1943) is a former Uruguayan footballer who competed in several soccer leagues in the United States and Netherlands during the 1960s and 1970s. He played as a forward for one season in the National Professional Soccer League, four in the North American Soccer League, one in the American Soccer League, and five in the Netherlands.

Fernández started his career at Club Sport Emelec. In 1967, Fernandez played for the Los Angeles Toros of the National Professional Soccer League. In 1968, the NPSL merged with the United Soccer Association to form the North American Soccer League (NASL). When that happened, the Toros moved to San Diego. Fernandez remained with the San Diego Toros in 1968 where he was selected as a first team All Star and set a league scoring record with 30 goals. The Toros folded at the end of the season, along with 12 other franchises.

One of those teams—Oakland Clippers, who were 1967 NPSL champions and were one of the top teams in the 1968 NASL—opted to play an independent schedule against top foreign clubs. The Clippers boosted their offense for 1969 by signing Fernandez, as well as 1968 leading scorer John Kowalik. Renaming themselves "California Clippers," the team only played a handful of games before folding.

Fernandez then moved to the Kansas City Spurs in the middle of the 1969 season. He was once again a first team All Star as well as the NASL MVP. According to one source, Fernandez spent five seasons in the Netherlands at Go Ahead Eagles and HFC Haarlem. He did not return to the NASL until 1974 when he signed with the expansion Seattle Sounders. He started the first three games of the season, but a vicious slide tackle by David Kemp broke his leg during the Sounders home debut putting him out for the season. Fernandez played only twelve games in 1975, then began the 1976 season when he was released after two games. He then signed with the expansion Tacoma Tides of the American Soccer League. The Tides went to the ASL playoff semifinals but folded soon after. Fernandez then played HFC Haarlem before returning to the Sounders for the 1981-1982 NASL indoor season.

Fernández lives in Everett, Washington, where he owns an indoor soccer business.
