= Balboa Stadium =

Multi-sport stadium in San Diego, California

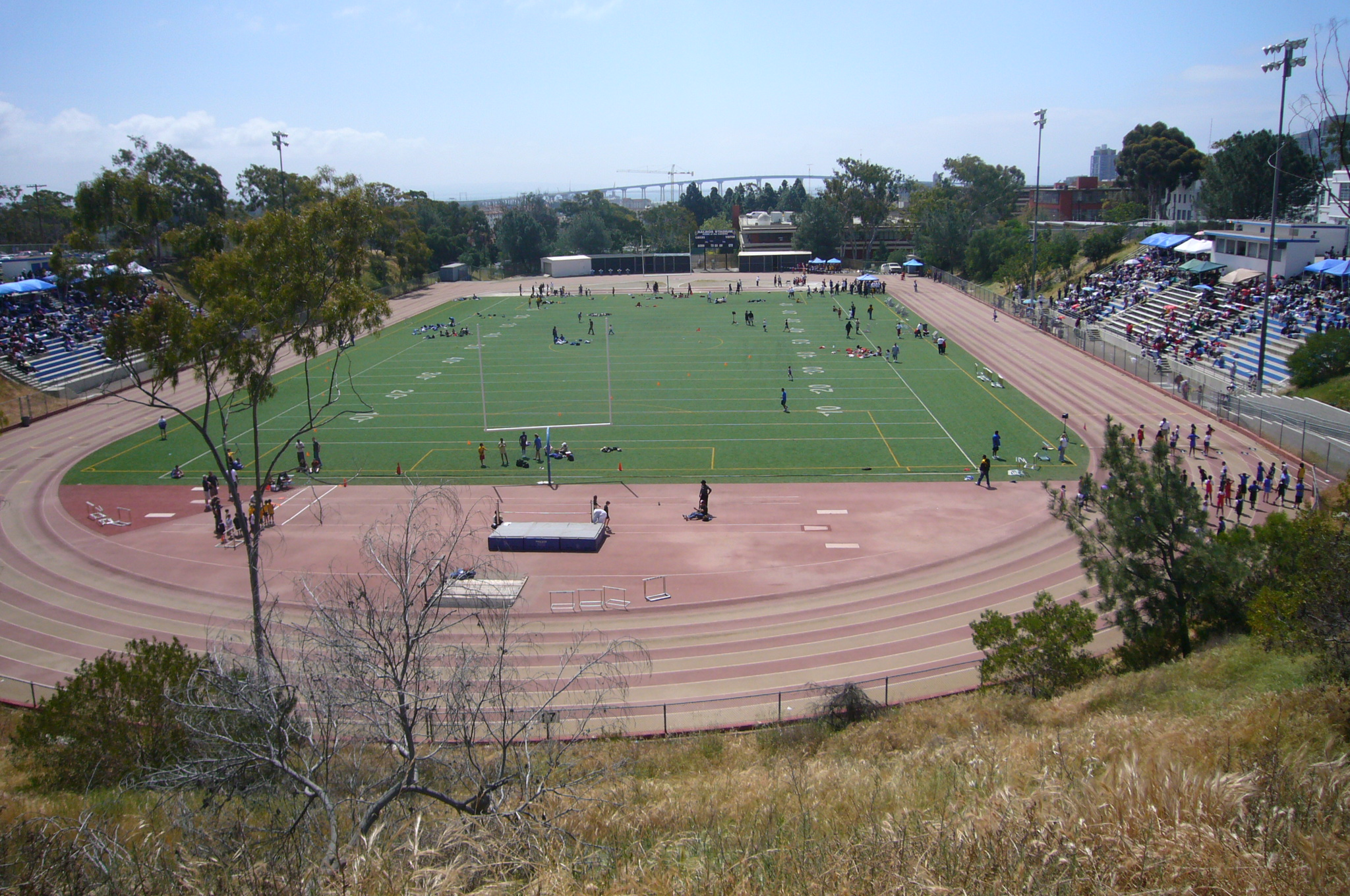

- Location in the United States Location in California
- Interactive map of Balboa Stadium
- Former names: City Stadium
- Address: 1405 Park Boulevard
- Location: San Diego, California, U.S.
- Coordinates: 32°43′15″N 117°9′2″W
- Owner: City of San Diego
- Operator: San Diego Unified School District
- Capacity: 3,000 (1978–present); 34,000 (1961–1966); 23,000 (1960); 15,000 (1914)
- Surface: Artificial turf originally natural grass

Construction
- Built: 1914
- Renovated: 1978
- Architect: Quayle Brothers

Tenants
- San Diego High School Cavers (1915–present); San Diego East-West Christmas Classic (NCAA) (1921–1922); San Diego State Aztecs (NCAA) (1921–1935); Harbor Bowl (NCAA) (1947–1949); Poinsettia Bowl (military) (1952–1955); San Diego Chargers (AFL) (1961–1966); San Diego Toros (NASL) (1968); San Diego Pumitas (NPSL) (1999–2007); San Diego Flash (2010) (NPSL; charity events); San Diego Boca FC (NPSL) (2011–2014); San Diego Growlers (AUDL) (2015–2017)

Balboa Stadium is an outdoor stadium in San Diego, California, adjacent to San Diego High School and Balboa Park. Owned by the City of San Diego, it is leased to San Diego Unified School District. The stadium is used for local athletics and high school events. It has been the home of the San Diego High School Cavers athletic teams since it opened in 1915.

The original stadium was built in 1914 as part of the 1915 Panama–California Exposition with a capacity of 15,000. The stadium expanded in the 1960s to a capacity of 34,000. Due to seismic safety concerns, it was demolished in the 1970s and a smaller venue with a 3,000-seat capacity was built, opening in 1978. Most of the original stadium's distinguishing architectural features were removed.

The stadium hosted the San Diego State Aztecs football team from 1921 to 1935. It also hosted the San Diego Chargers of the American Football League (AFL) from 1961 to 1966. Additionally, the stadium hosted various bowl games, including the San Diego East-West Christmas Classic from 1921 to 1922, the Harbor Bowl from 1947 to 1949, and the Poinsettia Bowl from 1952 to 1955.

== Earlier uses ==
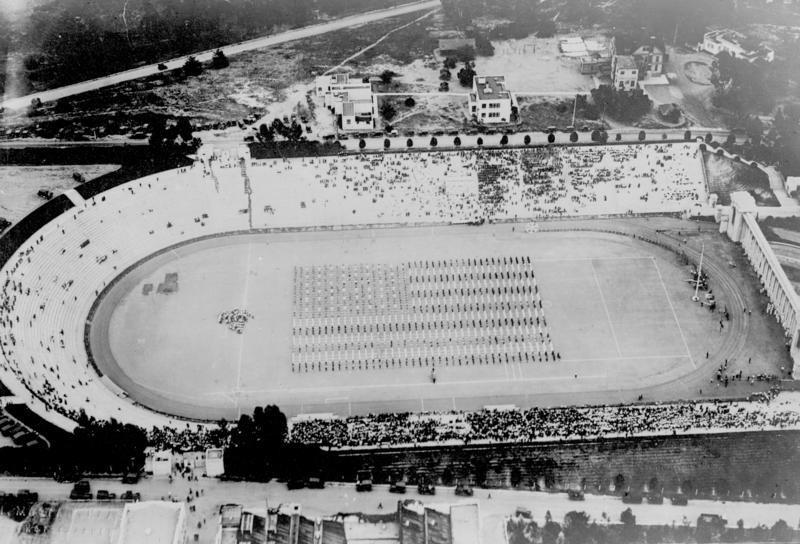
Aerial view from west in 1932

The original stadium was built in 1914 as part of the 1915 Panama–California Exposition, also in Balboa Park, with a capacity of 15,000. A horseshoe design that opened to the south, it was designed by the Quayle Brothers architectural firm and originally called City Stadium. On May 31, 1915, the stadium was dedicated and around 20,000 people came to watch track and field events. Since 1915, it has been the home field of the San Diego High School Cavers athletic teams.

Auto racing took place on a quarter-mile dirt track in Balboa Stadium from about 1937 through July 4, 1961, when the racing stopped so the facility could be used for pro football. Balboa Stadium was one of the hotbeds of midget racing starting in about 1937 until the early 1950s (except for the war years). When interest in midget racing started waning, jalopies became popular. The San Diego Racing Association was formed in 1953 and started sanctioning the racing. By 1958, the San Diego Racing Assn had transformed from a jalopy association to a sleeker modified sportsman (the forerunners of today's super modifieds). Jalopy champions of the SDRA at Balboa included Glen Hoagland (1953), Jim Wood (1954), Jack Krogh (1955), Harris Mills (1956), Don Ray (1957), and Mondo Iavelli (1958). Don Thomas (1957) was the inaugural modified champion with Art Pratt being a three time titlest (1958 - 1959 - 1960). Rip Erikson took the honors in the 1961 season that was split between Balboa Stadium and Cajon Speedway. Also holding events at Balboa Stadium during the 1950s were occasional visits by the URA midgets and the NASCAR Pacific Coast Late Models. During the 1950s it was not unusual for more than 10,000 fans to attend a weekly show at Balboa.

The stadium also hosted local amateur and professional baseball contests in the period prior to the establishment of the Pacific Coast League Padres in 1936. Babe Ruth, Lou Gehrig, Ty Cobb, and Satchel Paige played in Balboa Stadium.

College football's Harbor Bowl was held there from 1947 to 1949. The San Diego East-West Christmas Classic was held there in 1921 and 1922. From 1952 through 1955, the stadium hosted the Poinsettia Bowl, contested between armed services football teams. From 1958 to 1964, it hosted the Leatherneck Bowl, a charity game between Marine Corps Recruit Depot San Diego and another military service team.

The stadium has been the site of famous races in track and field. In 1965, high-schooler Jim Ryun from Kansas beat world-record holder and reigning 1500 m Olympic champion Peter Snell of New Zealand in a mile race in 3:55.3 on June 27, an American high school record that stood for 42 years. A year later, Tim Danielson from San Diego area Chula Vista High School ran 3:59.4 in the same stadium to become only the second high school runner to run a sub-4:00 mile. Only three high school runners have managed to break that barrier since (Marty Liquori in 1967, Alan Webb in 2001, and Lukas Verzbicas in 2011). Fifty years after Ryun first broke the 4 minute mile, the stadium hosted a "Festival of Miles" featuring a return of Ryun.

The first two major meets of the developing age division of Masters athletics were held in Balboa Stadium, July 19–20, 1968, and July 3–6, 1969.

During the mid to late 1950s, a huge musical production, The California Story, was put on in Balboa Stadium as part of the Fiesta del Pacifico celebration. The extravaganza featured a cast of 1,300 people, including a symphony orchestra and a 150-voice choir. Performances were directed by Meredith Willson, who also contributed music and lyrics. The production followed the history of California from the arrival of Juan Rodríguez Cabrillo in 1540 through the early 20th century. It was billed as "the biggest non-movie spectacle ever produced anywhere."

== San Diego Chargers ==
To accommodate the American Football League's Chargers, which moved from Los Angeles, the seating capacity was increased from 23,000 to 34,000 by adding an upper deck in May. It was their home for six years, through the 1966 season.

Balboa Stadium witnessed the Chargers' glory years in the American Football League, which featured such players as John Hadl, Lance Alworth, Jack Kemp, Keith Lincoln, and Ernie Ladd, and hosted the 1961, 1963, and 1965 AFL championship games (1W, 2L), as well as the 1961, 1962, and 1963 AFL All-Star games. In their six seasons here, head coach Sid Gillman's club had a home record of 28–12–2 (.690), winning four Western Division titles and one league crown (1963).

In 1967, the Chargers left Balboa for the new San Diego Stadium (later known by multiple other names) in Mission Valley, where the club's glory slowed and the titles stopped (although they did win several AFC Western Division titles) until they won the AFC championship in 1994; the Chargers returned to Los Angeles in 2017.

== Concerts ==
The stadium was used for popular music concerts and other public gatherings through the 1960s and 1970s.

On August 28, 1965, the Beatles performed at the stadium during their second North American tour.

On September 3, 1968, Jimi Hendrix performed at the Balboa Stadium with his band The Jimi Hendrix Experience.

The Doors' concert at Balboa with Ike & Tina Turner on October 26, 1969 was canceled by the city council due to Jim Morrison's arrest for indecent exposure earlier that year.

Notable musicians and signers who have performed at the stadium include Crosby, Stills, Nash and Young, the Doobie Brothers, Linda Ronstadt, the Eagles, Led Zeppelin, Peter Frampton, Yes, Jethro Tull, Robin Trower, Jimi Hendrix, Pink Floyd, Steely Dan, Chicago, Jefferson Airplane, Santana and Fleetwood Mac.

== Notable events ==
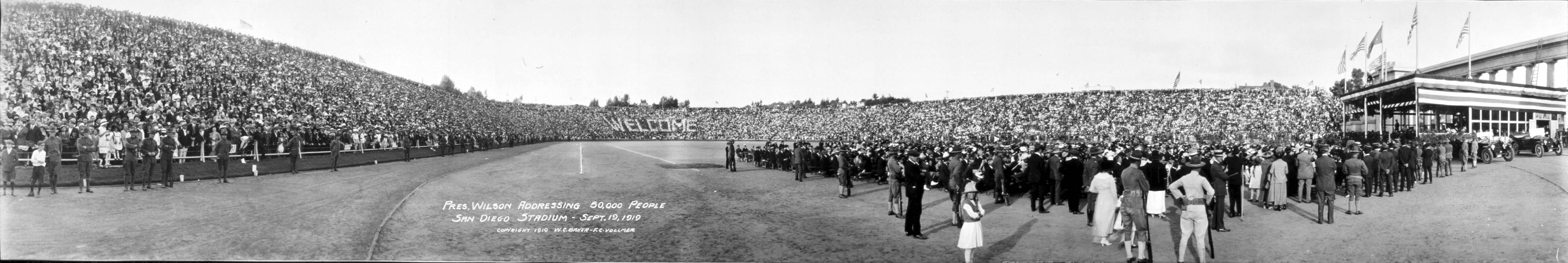
Woodrow Wilson's speech at Balboa Stadium, Sep 19, 1919

On September 19, 1919, President Woodrow Wilson spoke in front of over 50,000 people in Balboa Stadium in support of the creation of the League of Nations. This was the first presidential speech to use an electronic voice amplification system. This system was invented by Edwin S. Pridham and Peter L. Jensen. They called their invention the "Magnavox" ("Great Voice") moving coil device. The two would go on to found the Magnavox company.

On September 21, 1927, Charles Lindbergh visited San Diego, where the Spirit of St. Louis was built by Ryan Aeronautical, and was greeted with a hero's welcome at the stadium. With over 60,000 in attendance (10,000 more than President Wilson) he performed a low-level fly over at 100 feet, dipping his aircraft's wings and circling the stadium 8 times. He landed and was then paraded through the city to the stadium where the crowd had to be held back by 650 U.S. Marines.

On December 7, 1941, a Navy vs. Marines football game was interrupted at halftime by news of the attack on Pearl Harbor. The game was never finished.

The stadium was also the site of the first match of the NASL Final 1968.

On March 24, 1976, the San Diego Jaws played the Pelé led New York Cosmos in front of 18,128 people to a 1–1 draw.

== Modern stadium ==
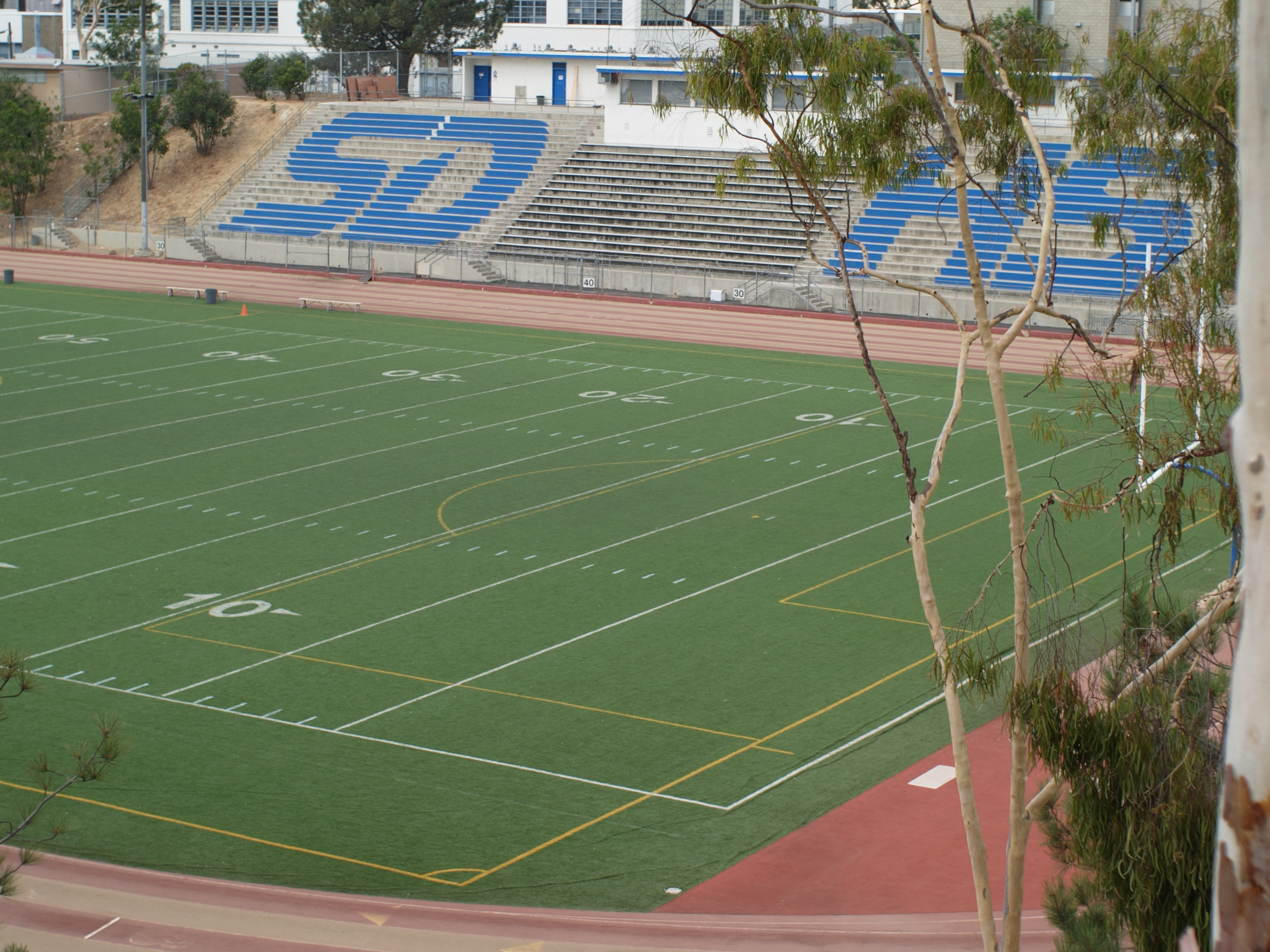
View from northeast in 2008

The original stadium was demolished in the 1970s due to concerns about its stability during an earthquake, and was rebuilt in 1978 with a much smaller seating capacity than when it housed the Chargers. Most of its distinguishing architectural features were removed. The remaining seating is made up of simple concrete bleachers, which also form the walls of the canyon the field is built in.

San Diego's largest and oldest running club, the San Diego Track Club also calls Balboa Stadium its home. It is used by San Diego High School for local high school sporting and other events. During the 1990s and the 2000s, it was also used as the home field (for football only) by St. Augustine High School and San Diego City College.

Balboa Stadium is the site of the annual "Stand Down" program, an outreach to provide services to needy and homeless military veterans, sponsored by the Veterans Village of San Diego.

An article in the San Diego Union-Tribune on November 27, 2006, highlighted the stadium's state of disrepair. Artificial turf installed in 2001 was torn and rippling, and the track surrounding the field had dangerous depressions thought to be able to cause injury to runners. Both the turf and the track have since been completely renovated.

Preceded by Los Angeles Coliseum	Home of the San Diego Chargers; 1961 – 1966	Succeeded by Qualcomm Stadium
