= San Diego Toros =

- Full name: San Diego Toros
- Founded: 1966 (Los Angeles Toros); 1968 (San Diego Toros)
- Dissolved: 1968
- Stadium: Los Angeles Memorial Coliseum (1967); Los Angeles, California; Balboa Stadium (1968); San Diego, California
- Capacity: 93,000; 34,000
- League: North American Soccer League
Home colors	Away colors

The San Diego Toros were a professional soccer team based in San Diego, California, United States. Founded in 1967 as the Los Angeles Toros, the team was one of the ten charter members of the National Professional Soccer League (NPSL). When the NPSL and the rival United Soccer Association (USA) merged in 1968 to form the North American Soccer League (NASL), the team was relocated to San Diego as a member of the new league. While in Los Angeles, the team played its home matches at the Los Angeles Memorial Coliseum and at Balboa Stadium when it moved to San Diego. The team folded at the conclusion of the 1968 NASL season.

== History ==
In 1966, several groups of entrepreneurs were exploring the idea of forming a professional soccer league in United States. Two of these groups merged to form the National Professional Soccer League (NPSL) and franchise rights were awarded to ten ownership groups, with one given to Los Angeles Rams owner Dan Reeves. The Toros secured a lease at the Los Angeles Memorial Coliseum, which would also host the Los Angeles Wolves of the rival USA during the 1967 season.

The Toros began the season on April 16, 1967, with a home 3–2 win against the New York Generals in front of a crowd of over 9,000. The team finished the season in fifth place in the Western Division with a record of 7 wins, 10 losses, and 15 draws and an average attendance of 3,595. Dan Reeves sold the team to a group that included Bill Cox, who acted as general manager.

When the NPSL merged with the United Soccer Association, it was announced that Los Angeles would be one of the 20 teams in play in the North American Soccer League (NASL). (Note: 17 teams contested the 1968 NASL season with three teams folding before the season began) Prior to the 1968 season, the Toros moved to San Diego so that the league would not have two teams in the Los Angeles market. The Toros played their home games at Balboa Stadium. Midway through the 1968 NASL season, Cox took a position with the St. Louis Stars and sold the team to Emilio Azcárraga Milmo. The team finished the season in first place in the Pacific Division with a record of 18 wins, 8 losses, and 6 draws, earning the highest points total in the league. The team defeated the Kansas City Spurs with an aggregate score of 2–1 over two matches in the conference finals but were defeated by the Atlanta Chiefs with an aggregate score of 3–0 in the NASL Final 1968. The Toros were one of 12 teams that folded between the 1968 and 1969 NASL seasons.

== 1968 Roster ==
As of November 2, 2026

Note: Flags indicate national team as defined under FIFA eligibility rules; some limited exceptions apply. Players may hold more than one non-FIFA nationality.

No.	Pos.	Nation	Player
1	GK	YUG	Blagoje Vidinić
2	DF	YUG	Miroslav Milovanovic
3	MF	YUG	Novak Tomić
4	MF	MEX	Severo de Sales
5	MF	ENG	Ray Freeman
6	DF	ENG	Ron Crisp (captain)
7	FW	MEX	Jose Lopez
8	FW	YUG	Mihalj Mesaroš
9	FW	URU	Pepe Fernández
10	FW	BRA	Vavá
11	FW	MEX	Alberto Baeza
12	GK	ARG	Ataúlfo Sánchez
13	FW	BRA	Eli Durante
14	FW	MEX	Felipe Orta
15	GK	MEX	Humberto Arrieta

No.	Pos.	Nation	Player
16	DF	ENG	Hugh Pratt
17	FW	GER	Gerd Ziemann
18	DF	MEX	Ricardo Mungía
19	DF	ENG	Henry Hill
20	FW	MEX	Ruben Munoz
21	FW	MEX	Guillermo Guzman
22	FW	BRA	Enos Periera
23	MF	URU	Ruben Filomeno
24	FW	MLT	Charlie Williams

Position	Staff
Manager	(England) George Curtis
Assistant manager	(Greece) Angel Papadopulos
General Manager	(United States) Julian Kaufman

== Year-by-year ==
Year	League	W	L	T	Pts	Reg. season	Playoffs
1967	NPSL	7	10	15	114	5th, Western Division	did not qualify
1968	NASL	18	8	6	186	1st, Pacific Division	Won Playoff (Kansas City); Lost Championship (Atlanta)
