= Kansas City Spurs =

Defunct American soccer club

- Full name: Kansas City Spurs
- Nickname: Spurs
- Founded: 1968
- Dissolved: 1970; 56 years ago
- Stadium: Kansas City Municipal Stadium, Kansas City, Missouri; Pembroke Hill School
- Capacity: 35,561 (Municipal); NA (Pembroke)
- Head coach: (England) Alan Rogers
- League: North American Soccer League
- 1970: 3rd, Northern Division; Playoffs: DNQ
Home colors	Away colors

The Kansas City Spurs were an American professional soccer team who played in the North American Soccer League, based in Kansas City, Missouri. They played their home games at Kansas City Municipal Stadium, former home of the Kansas City Chiefs, Kansas City Athletics, and Kansas City Royals. The club was previously known as the Chicago Spurs of the National Professional Soccer League but were relocated to Kansas City following the merger of the NPSL and the United Soccer Association to form the NASL in 1967. The Spurs won the NASL Championship in 1969 but were dissolved shortly after the 1970 NASL season. The club's colors were red and white.

== History ==
The Kansas City Spurs were founded in 1968 following the merger of the National Professional Soccer League (NPSL) and the United Soccer Association (USA) to form the new first division professional league, the North American Soccer League (NASL). The team was relocated from Chicago, IL, where the Chicago Spurs had only played a single season in 1967 in the NPSL before the formation of the new league. The Spurs left for Kansas City to avoid competition with the Chicago Mustangs, who had also joined the NASL from the old USA.

Following the 1968 NASL season, the league was in trouble with ten franchises having folded. The 1969 season was split into two halves: The first half was called the International Cup, a double round robin tournament in which the remaining NASL clubs were represented by teams imported from the United Kingdom. The Spurs were represented by Wolverhampton Wanderers, who had won the 1967 United Soccer Association championship as the Los Angeles Wolves. The Spurs won the Cup with a 6–2–0 record. For the second half of the 1969 season, the teams returned to their normal rosters and played a 16-game schedule with no playoffs. The club would capture the regular season championship in the same season, with players such as Willy Roy and Pepe Fernandez, also leading the league in attendance with an average of 4,273 fans during the difficult year.

The Spurs finished in last place in the Northern Division in 1970 and ceased operations shortly thereafter.

The club was initially coached by Hungarian Janos Bedl, who would lead the club to victory in only its second season but he would be replaced the following year by English coach, Alan Rogers, who had debuted with the Chicago Spurs in 1967 and would return to coach the club for its final season in 1970.

== Home grounds ==
The Spurs played their first two seasons at Kansas City Municipal Stadium. In the final season, they moved to what is now Hicks Field at the Pembroke Hill School.

== Media ==
The Spurs had radio coverage all three seasons. At the start in 1968, KCJC-FM broadcast home matches, with Bill Beck and Jim Koerner doing commentary. In 1969 there was a deal with KCMO (AM) to broadcast one friendly versus Wolverhampton Wanderers and 14 of 16 regular season matches, with Kansas City Blues announcer Lynn Farris doing commentary. In 1970, KBEA would broadcast 14 matches including a friendly with Coventry City. Mike Selbert and Gene Hart would be commentators.

Television coverage was restricted to CBS network coverage in 1968, with the Spurs appearing in 3 matches: April 27 vs the St. Louis Stars, July 7 vs the Oakland Clippers and August 4 vs the San Diego Toros. As these were all home matches, they would all have been blacked out in Kansas City, with WIBW-TV in Topeka being the nearest station.

== Year-by-year ==
Year	League	W	L	T	Pts	Reg. season	Playoffs	Avg. attendance
1968	NASL	16	11	5	158	1st, Gulf Division	Lost Playoff (San Diego)	8,510
1969	NASL	10	2	4	110	1st	Champions (no playoff)	4,273
1970	NASL	8	10	6	100	3rd, Northern Division	did not qualify	2,398

== Honors ==
NASL championships

- 1969

NASL Season Premierships

- 1969

NASL Division titles

- 1968: Gulf Division

NASL International Cup

- 1969

NASL Coach of the Year

- 1969: Janos Bedl

NASL MVP

- 1969: Pepe Fernández

All-Star first team selections

- 1969: Leonel Conde, Pepe Fernández, Manfred Seissler, William Quirós
- 1970: Manfred Seissler

All-Star second team selections

- 1968: Eric Barber
- 1970: Leonel Conde, Miranda Oliveira

U.S. Soccer Hall of Fame

- 1989: Willy Roy

Canada Soccer Hall of Fame

- 2008: Les Wilson

Indoor Soccer Hall of Fame

- 2011: Don Popovic

== Coaches ==
- (Hungary) Janos Bedl (1968-1969)
- (England) Alan Rogers (1970)

== See also ==
- Chicago Spurs
- Chicago Mustangs (1967–68)
- Kansas City Chiefs
- Sporting Kansas City
