= Mike (given name) =

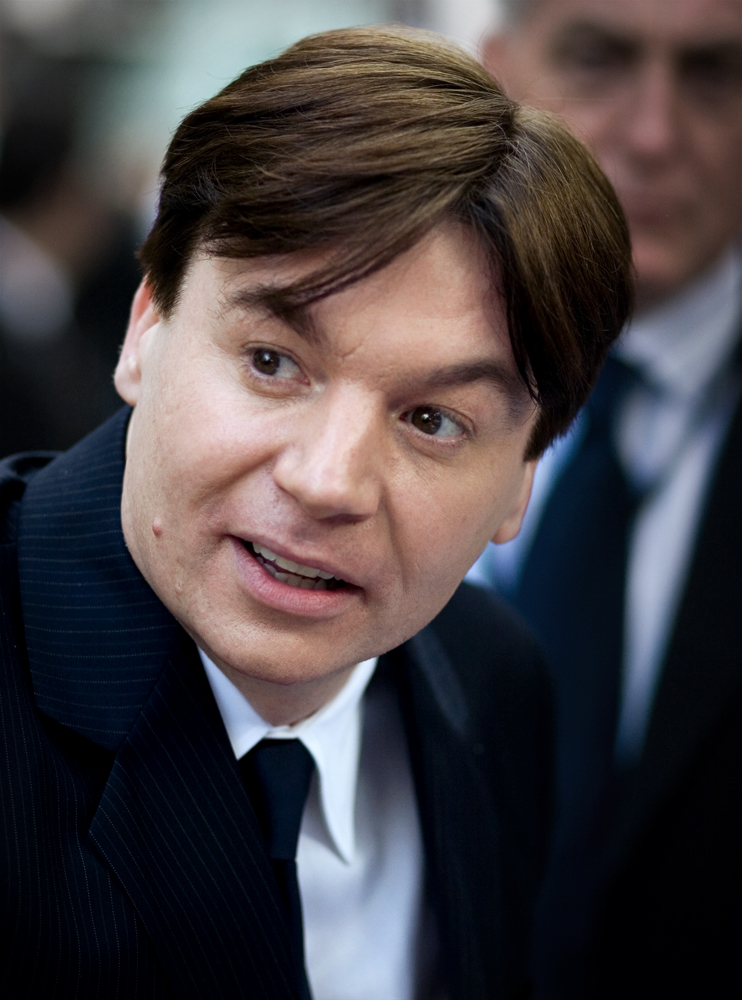
- Mike Myers in 2007
- Pronunciation: /maɪk/ MYK
- Gender: Male
- Language: English

Origin
- Languages: 1. Hebrew; 2. English
- Origin: Diminutive form of Michael
- Region of origin: English-speaking world

Other names
- Alternative spelling: Mikey
- Related names: Michael, Mikey

Mike is a masculine given name, most commonly encountered as a short form of Michael. Notable people with the name include:

== People ==
- Mike (Brazilian footballer) (Mike dos Santos Nenatarvicius) (born 1993), Brazilian football forward
- Mike (musician), American rapper, songwriter and record producer
- Mike Adenuga (born 1953), Nigerian billionaire businessman
- Mike Affleck (born 1984), American football player
- Mike Akiu (born 1962), American football player and coach
- Mike Aldrete (born 1961), American baseball player and coach
- Mike Alford (born 1943), American football player
- Mike Alstott (born 1973), American football player
- Mike Ashley (businessman) (born 1964), British businessman
- Mike Ashley (writer) (born 1948), British author and anthology editor
- Mike Atkinson (born 1994), English–Belizean footballer
- Mike Awesome (1965–2007), ring name for American professional wrestler Michael Lee Alfonso (1965–2007)
- Mike Barnett (athlete) (born 1961), American javelin thrower
- Mike Barnett (baseball) (born 1959), American baseball coach
- Mike Barnett (ice hockey) (born 1948), Canadian ice hockey executive
- Mike Barnett (politician) (1946–2023), Australian politician
- Mike Baumann (born 1995), American baseball player
- Mike Baur (born 1951), American sculptor
- Mike Beebe (born 1946), American attorney
- Mike Bercovici (born 1993), American football player
- Mike Bloomberg (born 1942), American businessman and 2020 Democratic presidential candidate
- Mike Bloomfield (1943–1981), American musician
- Mike Boeve (born 2002), American baseball player
- Mike Boone (born 1995), American football player
- Mike Bossy (1957–2022), Canadian National Hockey League player
- Mike Breen (born 1961), American sportscaster
- Mike Brosseau (born 1994), American baseball player
- Mike Brown, multiple people
- Mike Bryan (born 1978), American professional tennis player
- Mike Burkhead, American football player
- Mike Buttress (born 1958), English former footballer
- Mike Cameron (born 1973), American baseball player
- Mike Carp (born 1986), American Major League Baseball player
- Michael Carter, multiple people
- Mike Clevinger (born 1990), American baseball player
- Mike Clines (born 1968), American politician
- Mike Conley Jr. (born 1987), American basketball player
- Mike Coppinger, American boxing journalist
- Michael Cox, multiple people
- Mike Crumb (born 1970), Canadian football player
- Mike Conway (born 1983), British race car driver
- Mike Cernovich (born 1977), American social media personality, writer and conspiracy theorist
- Mike D (born 1965), American musician and founding member of The Beastie Boys
- Mike D'Antoni (born 1951), American basketball coach
- Mike Danna (born 1997), American football player
- James "Mike" DeBardeleben (1940–2011), American rapist and possible serial killer
- Mike DeVault (born 1958), American politician
- Mike DeWine (born 1947), American politician and 70th Governor of Ohio
- Mike Dibb (born 1940), English documentary filmmaker
- Mike Dickison, New Zealand museum curator, zoologist and Wikipedia editor
- Mike Dirnt (born 1972), bassist for Green Day
- Mike Ditka (1939–2026), American football player and coach
- Mike Dierickx (born 1973), aka M.I.K.E., Belgian progressive trance DJ/producer
- Mike Eghan (1936–2025), Ghanaian radio broadcaster
- Mike Enriquez (1951–2023), Filipino journalist
- Mike Enzi (1944–2021), American politician
- Mike Epstein (born 1943), American Major League Baseball first baseman
- Mike Farnworth (born 1959), Canadian politician
- Michael Ferguson, multiple people
- Mike Fetters (born 1964), American baseball player and coach
- Mike Fisher, multiple people
- Mike Ford, multiple people
- Mike Franks (tennis) (born 1936), American tennis player
- Mike Friede (born 1957), American football player
- Mike Gartner (born 1959), Canadian National Hockey League player
- Mike Gesicki (born 1995), American football player
- Mike George (wrestler) (born 1949), American retired professional wrestler
- Mike Gibbins (1949–2005), Welsh drummer, member of the rock band Badfinger
- Mike Glennon (born 1989), American football player
- Mike Green, multiple people
- Mike Hanopol (born 1946), Filipino rock singer, guitarist, recording artist and Messianic religious leader
- Mike Harkey (born 1966), American baseball player and coach
- Mike Harley Jr. (born 1997), American football player
- Mike Hartman (born 1967), American National Hockey League player
- Mike Hax (born 1970), German judoka
- Mike Hibler (born 1946), American football player
- Mike Hollway, American football coach
- Mike Howell (1943–2016), American football player
- Mike Hubbard, multiple people
- Mike Huckabee (born 1955), American politician
- Mike Henson (1963–2002), American actor and model
- Mike Hughes (American football) (born 1997), American football player
- Mike Hunt, multiple people
- Mike Ilitch (1929–2017), American entrepreneur
- Mike Jones, multiple people
- Mike Joyce (musician) (born 1963), English drummer for The Smiths
- Mike Judge (born 1962), American cartoonist, animator, voice actor and comedian
- Mike Kellogg (American football) (born 1942), American football player
- Mike Kennerty (born 1980), guitarist of the band The All-American Rejects
- Mike Kirkland, multiple people
- Mike Kreger, former drummer for Michigan heavy metal band Battlecross
- Mike Krüger (born 1951), German comedian and singer
- Mike Largey (born 1960), American basketball player in the Israeli Basketball Premier League
- Mike Lee (born 1971), American lawyer and politician
- Mike Lenzly (born 1981), British basketball player
- Mike Levenseller (born 1956), American football player
- Mike Lieberthal (born 1972), American Major League Baseball catcher
- Mike Little (born 1962), British web developer, co-founder of WordPress
- Mike Love (born 1941), American singer and songwriter who co-founded The Beach Boys
- Mike Love (American football) (born 1994), American football player
- Mike Lynn (basketball) (born 1945), American basketball player
- Mike Markuson (born 1961), American football coach
- Mike Mayers (born 1991), American baseball player
- Mike McShane (born 1955), American actor
- Mike McCarthy (born 1963), American football coach
- Mike McCready (born 1966), guitarist of the band Pearl Jam
- Mike McGlinchey (offensive lineman) (born 1995), American football player
- Mike McLaughlin (racing driver) (born 1956), American racing driver
- Mike McRoberts (born 1966), New Zealand television journalist
- Mike Miles, multiple people
- Mike Minor, multiple people
- Mike Mitchell (cornerback) (born 1961), American football player
- Mike Mitchell (cricketer) (1843–1905), English cricketer and schoolmaster
- Mike Mitchell (director), American film director
- Mike Mitchell (drummer), Jazz drummer
- Mike Mitchell (musician) (1944–2021), American musician
- Mike Mitchell (Ohio politician), American politician
- Mike Mitchell (safety) (born 1987), American football player
- Mike Kanentakeron Mitchell, Canadian Mohawk politician, filmmaker and lacrosse builder
- Mike Mizanin (born 1980), American professional wrestler who is better known by his ring name "The Miz"
- Mike Modano (born 1970), American National Hockey League player
- Mike Morris, multiple people
- Michael Morrison, multiple people
- Mike Moser (born 1990), American basketball player
- Mike Moura (born 1989), Portuguese footballer
- Mike Moustakas (born 1988), American baseball player
- Mike Mucitelli (born 1983), American mixed martial artist
- Mike Muscala (born 1991), American basketball player
- Mike Myers (born 1963), Canadian-British-American actor, comedian, screenwriter, director, and film producer
- Mike Napoli (born 1981), American baseball player and coach
- Mike Nease (born 1961), American football player
- Mike Nifong (born 1950), American district attorney disbarred for misconduct in the Duke lacrosse case
- Mike Nott (born 1952), American football player
- Mike Novitsky (born 1999), American football player
- Mike Oldfield (born 1953), English multi-instrumentalist, known for his 1973 album Tubular Bells
- Mike Oliveira (born 1990), Brazilian professional boxer
- Mike Oliver, multiple people
- Mike O'Malley (born 1966), American game show host
- Mike Ozdowski (born 1955), American football player
- Mike Panasiuk (born 1997), American football player
- Mike Parson (born 1955), American politician
- Mike Pence (born 1959), American politician and 48th Vice President of the United States
- Mike Polk, American comedian
- Mike Pollock (rugby league), New Zealand rugby league footballer of the 1910s and 1920s
- Mike Pollock (voice actor) (born 1965), American voice actor
- Mike Pompeo (born 1963), American politician and former Secretary of State of the United States
- Mike Porcaro (1955–2015), American bassist, member of the rock band Toto
- Mike Portnoy (born 1967), drummer for Neal Morse band and former drummer and founding member of Dream Theater
- Mike Posner (born 1988), American singer-songwriter, musician, and record producer
- Mike Purcell (born 1991), American football player
- Mike Rabelo (born 1980), American baseball player and coach
- Mike Rawlings (born 1954), American politician
- Mike Redmond (born 1971), American baseball player and coach
- Mike Rhodes (American football) (born 1966), American football player
- Mike Rose, multiple people
- Mike Rosenberg, better known by his stage name Passenger, English singer-songwriter and musician
- Mike Rosenthal (born 1977), American football player
- Mike Rossman (Michael Albert DiPiano) (born 1955), American world champion light heavyweight boxer
- Mike Rowe (born 1962), American television personality
- Mike Rowe (ice hockey) (born 1965), Canadian ice hockey player
- Mike Rowe (racing driver), American racing driver
- Mike Rutenberg (born 1981), American football coach
- Mike Rutherford (born 1950), British progressive rock guitarist
- Mike Sainristil (born 2000), Haitian American football player
- Mike Sanders (basketball) (born 1960), American basketball player and coach
- Mike Sarbaugh (born 1967), American baseball coach
- Mike Schwartz, multiple people; see Michael Schwartz (disambiguation)
- Mike Schmidt (born 1949), American professional baseball player for the Philadelphia Phillies
- Mike Seidman (born 1981), American football player
- Mike Shinoda (born 1977), vocalist and rhythm guitarist of the band Linkin Park
- Mike Shooter, British psychiatrist
- Mike Siani (baseball) (born 1999), American baseball player
- Mike Skinner (musician) (born 1979), British rapper, singer-songwriter, musician, and record producer
- Mike Skinner (racing driver) (born 1957), American racing driver
- Michael Smith (disambiguation), multiple people
- Mike Soutar (born 1967), Scottish entrepreneur
- Mike Stefanik (1958–2019), American racing driver
- Mike Strachan, multiple people
- Mike Stud (born 1988), American rapper
- Mike Strug, American news anchor
- Mike Tan (born 1986), Filipino actor
- Mike Taylor (basketball coach) (born 1972), American basketball coach
- Mike Torres (born 1994), Dominican basketball player
- Mike Townsend (born 1952), American football player
- Mike Trainor (born 1981), American comedian
- Mike Trigg, American football player
- Mike Trout (born 1991), Major League Baseball player
- Mike Tsang (born 1993), Hong Kong singer
- Mike Tupper, American politician
- Mike Tyson (born 1966), American world champion heavyweight boxer
- Mike Tyson (American football) (born 1993), American football player
- Mike Veisor (born 1952), Canadian National Hockey League player
- Mike Vick (born 1980), American football player
- Mike Walker (tennis) (born 1966), former professional tennis player from Wales
- Mike Wallace, multiple people
- Mike Washington, multiple people
- Mike Weber (American football) (born 1997), American football player
- Mike Weinar (born 1984), American basketball coach
- Mike Wenstrup, American politician
- Mike White (quarterback) (born 1995), American football player
- Mike Whitmarsh (1962–2009), American volleyball and basketball player
- Mike Whitney (born 1959), Australian television personality and former cricketer
- Mike Whitwell (born 1958), American football player
- Mike Williams (disambiguation), multiple people
- Mike Will Made It (born 1989), American music producer and rapper
- Mike Witteck (1964–1990), American football player
- Mike Yastrzemski (born 1990), American baseball player
- Mike Young (American football) (born 1962), American football player
- Mike Zabel (born 1978), American politician
- Mike Zadick (born 1976), American wrestler
- Mike Zafirovski (born 1953), American businessman
- Mike Zagurski (born 1983), American baseball player
- Mike Zaher (born 1985), American soccer player
- Mike Zaimont, American game designer and programmer
- Mike Zalewski (born 1992), American professional ice hockey player
- Mike Zambidis (born 1980), Greek kickboxer
- Mike van der Zanden (born 1987), Dutch paraplegic swimmer
- Mike Zandofsky (born 1965), American football player
- Mike Zanier (born 1962), Canadian-Italian ice hockey player
- Mike Zapcic, American actor
- Mike "Zappy" Zapolin, American entrepreneur
- Mike Zawadzki, Soft redirect to Wikispecies
- Mike Zeck (born 1949), American comics artist
- Mike Zele (born 1956), American football player
- Mike Zentic (born 1963), American football player
- Mike Zimmer (born 1956), American football coach
- Mike Zimmer (politician), American politician (born 1963/64)
- Mike Zimring (1916–2011), American entertainment agent
- Mike Zito (born 1970), Musical artist
- Mike Zordich (born 1963), American football player and coach
- Mike Zuke (born 1954), Canadian ice hockey player
- Mike Zunino (born 1991), American baseball player
- Mike Zupancic (born 1989), American football player
- Mike Zuurman (born 1974), Dutch biologist
- Mike Zwerin (1930–2010), Musical artist

== Fictional characters ==
- Mike Ehrmantraut, a supporting character from Breaking Bad and Better Call Saul
- Mike, a character in the television series Power Rangers Samurai
- MIKE, a character from Twin Peaks
- Mike impersonators, a trio of characters in the game DELTARUNE
- Mike Corbett, a character in the television series Power Rangers Lost Galaxy
- Mike Dallas in Degrassi: The Next Generation
- Mike Flaherty, a character in the television series Spin City
- Mike Hammer (character), a private detective created by Mickey Spillane
- Mike Lane (Magic Mike), male stripper
- Mike Loughran, a character in the 2015 animated film Hotel Transylvania 2
- Mike Meekins, a character who features in the Ace Attorney video game series, under various occupations
- Mike Monroe, a fictional character in Northern Exposure
- Mike Newton, a character in the novel series Twilight
- Mike, a small red Arlesdale Railway engine, in The Railway Series by the Rev W. Awdry and the spin-off television series Thomas and Friends
- Mike Schmidt, a character in the first Five Nights at Freddy's game.
- Mike Teavee, a Charlie and the Chocolate Factory character
- Mike Wazowski, a main character in the animated film franchise Monsters, Incorporated
- Mike Wheeler, a main character in the television series Stranger Things

== See also ==
- Mike (disambiguation)
- Big Mike (nickname)
- List of people with given name Michael
- Mikee (given name)
- Myke
