= Kirkland (surname) =

Kirkland is a surname. It originated from a habitational name with variant spellings Kirtland and Kirtlan, from the English word Kirk meaning church, plus land, and was originally given either as a topographical name to someone resident on land belonging to the church, or as a locational name from any of the several places named Kirkland.

== A ==
- Alexander Kirkland (1901– c.1986), American actor
- Alfred Younges Kirkland Sr. (1917–2004), American judge
- Angus Kirkland (born 1965), British microscopist
- Anthony Kirkland (born 1968), American serial killer
- Arthur Kirkland, several people

== B ==
- B'Ho Kirkland (1912–2004), American football player
- Boyd Kirkland (1950–2011), American director
- Brian Joseph Kirkland (born 1981), American politician

== C ==
- Caroline Kirkland (1801–1864), American writer
- Cassandra Kirkland (1984–2017), French professional golfer
- Charles Kirkland (born 1950), American basketball player
- Charles-Aimé Kirkland (1896–1961), Canadian politician
- Chris Kirkland (born 1981), English footballer

== D ==
- Dennis Kirkland (1942–2006), British producer and director
- Donald Kirkland (1961–2023), United States Air Force lieutenant general
- Donna Kirkland, Australian politician
- Douglas Kirkland (1934–2022), Canadian-born American photographer

== E ==
- Eddie Kirkland (1923–2011), American blues musician
- Edward C. Kirkland (c. 1894 – 1975), American historian
- Edward R. Kirkland (1923–2012), American politician

== G ==
- Gelsey Kirkland (born 1952), American ballet dancer
- Geoffrey Kirkland (born 1939), English production designer
- Gordon Kirkland (coach) (1904–1953), football, baseball and basketball coach
- Graeme Kirkland, Canadian politician

== I ==
- Isabella Kirkland (born 1954), American artist and biodiversity researcher

== J ==
- James Kirkland, several people
- Jari Kirkland (born 1976), American ski mountaineer and marathon mountain biker
- Jaxson Kirkland (born 1998), American football player
- Jerusha Bingham Kirkland (1743–1788), American missionary
- Jesse Kirkland (born 1988), Bermudian competitive sailor
- Jessica Kirkland (born 1987), American tennis player
- Jim Kirkland (born 1946), English footballer
- John Thornton Kirkland (1770–1840), president of Harvard University (1810–1828)
- Joseph Kirkland (1830–1894), novelist
- Diamond D, born Joseph Kirkland (born 1968), music producer
- Josh Kirkland, American football coach
- Justin Kirkland (born 1996), Canadian ice hockey player

== K ==
- Katherine Kirkland (1808–1892), Australian colonist, squatter and memoirist
- Keith Kirkland (1900–1971), Australian freestyle swimmer
- Kenny Kirkland (1955–1998), American pianist and keyboardist

== L ==
- Lane Kirkland (1922–1999), president of the AFL-CIO
- Larry Kirkland (born 1950), American abstract sculptor
- Leigh G. Kirkland (1873–1942), American politician
- Leroy Kirkland (1904–1988), American musician
- Levon Kirkland (born 1969), American football player and coach

== M ==
- Marie-Claire Kirkland (1924–2016), Canadian politician
- Mark Kirkland, American animation director
- Mary Kirkland, Canadian set decorator
- Mike Kirkland (disambiguation), several people
- Muriel Kirkland (1903–1971), American actress

== N ==
- Niatia Jessica Kirkland, (born 1989), American singer

== P ==
- Patricia Kirkland (1925–2000), American actress
- Pee Wee Kirkland (born 1945), American streetball player and drug kingpin

== R ==
- Rhonda Kirkland, Canadian politician
- Richard Kirkland (1843–1863), Confederate soldier
- Ricky Kirkland, (born 1965), Created a large Christmas themed Light Show
- Robert Kirkland, several people
- Roy Kirkland American Filmmaker actor writer producer in Georgia USA

== S ==
- Sally Kirkland (1941–2025), American actress and producer
- Sally Kirkland (editor) (1912–1989), American journalist and fashion editor
- Samuel Kirkland (1741–1808), Presbyterian missionary
- Sean D. Kirkland, American philosopher
- Susan Kirkland (born 1956), Canadian epidemiologist

== T ==
- Terry Kirkland (born 1948), Canadian politician
- Thaddeus Kirkland (born 1955), American politician
- Thomas Kirkland (1721–1798), English physician and medical writer

== V ==
- Vance Kirkland (1904–1981), American painter

== W ==
- Wallace Kirkland (1891–1979), American photographer
- Weymouth Kirkland (1877–1965), American lawyer
- Wilbur Kirkland (born 1947), American basketball player
- William Whedbee Kirkland (1833–1915), American Confederate general
- Willie Kirkland (born 1934), American baseball player

== Z ==
- Zander Kirkland (born 1983), Bermudian competitive sailor
