= Mike =

Mike may refer to:

== Animals ==
- Mike (cat), cat and guardian of the British Museum
- Mike the Headless Chicken, chicken that lived for 18 months after his head had been cut off
- Mike (chimpanzee), a chimpanzee featured in several books and documentaries

== Arts ==
- Mike (miniseries), a 2022 Hulu limited series based on the life of American boxer Mike Tyson
- Mike (2022 film), a Malayalam film produced by John Abraham
- Mike (album), an album by Mike Mohede
- Mike (1926 film), an American film
- Mike (musician), American rapper, songwriter and record producer
- Mike (novel), a 1909 novel by P. G. Wodehouse
- "Mike" (song), by Elvana Gjata and Ledri Vula featuring John Shahu
- Mike (Twin Peaks), a character from Twin Peaks
- "Mike", a song by Xiu Xiu from their 2004 album Fabulous Muscles
- mike. (musician), American rapper and baseball player formerly known as Mike Stud

== Businesses ==
- Mike (cellular network), a defunct Canadian cellular network
- Mike and Ike, a candies brand

== Military ==
- MIKE Force, a unit in the Vietnam War
- Ivy Mike, the first test of a full-scale thermonuclear weapon

== Technology ==
- Microphone
- Micrometer (device)
- MIKE2.0 methodology, open source delivery methodology for enterprise information management consultants

== Other uses ==
- Mike (given name)
- The letter "M" in the NATO phonetic alphabet
- Mike, Missouri, a community in the United States
- Middle linebacker, a position in American football

== See also ==
- Mikee (given name)
- Mikes (disambiguation)
- Doctor Mike (disambiguation)
- Like Mike (disambiguation)
