= H. G. Stephenson =

H.G. Stephenson Ltd (Stephensons)
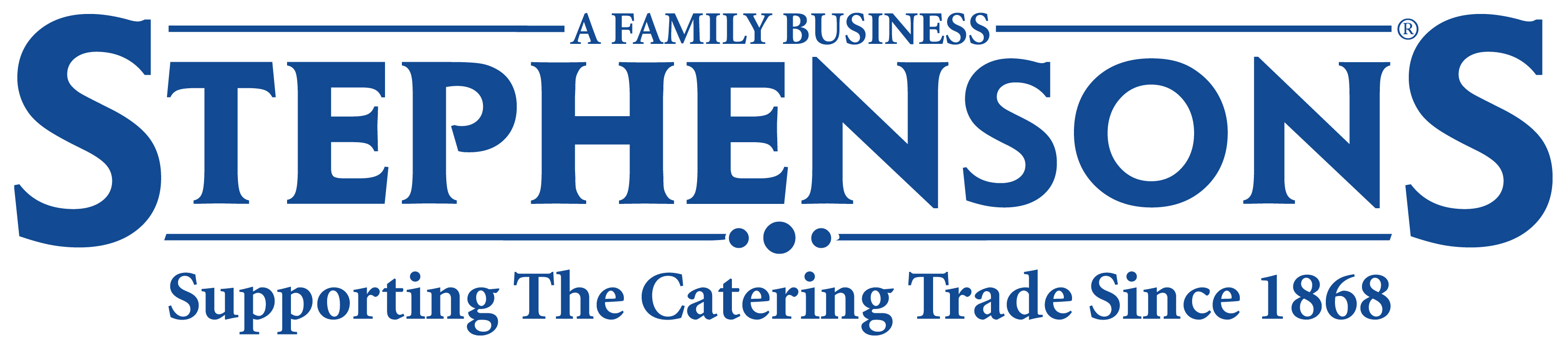
- Formation: 1868
- Founder: Henry George Stephenson
- Founded at: Barton Arcade, Manchester
- Headquarters: Kennerley Works, 161 Buxton Road, Stockport, SK2 6EQ
- Services: Catering & Hospitality Supplier
- Website: stephensons.com

H.G. Stephenson Ltd are an independent distributor of catering equipment. They distribute equipment in the field of crockery, glassware, food packaging, cleaning consumables, bar and kitchen equipment. They are based in Stockport, Greater Manchester, England.

Trading under ‘Stephensons’, the company is owned and run by the fifth generation of the family. The business was founded by Henry George Stephenson in 1860, with a stall he rented at the Salford Flat Iron markets. Later in 1868, he moved the business to the newly built Barton Arcade in Manchester. In the late 1960s, Stephensons moved to the Kennerley Works in Stockport, and this is still the company's base today.

In 2013, the business expanded its Stockport site by investing in neighbouring premises that were previously occupied by Piggott & Whitfield Ltd. This extension saw the site add over 30,000 sq ft. In November 2015, Stephensons responded to online growth by acquiring a 13,500 sq.ft. warehouse to improve customer service and buying power. In 2022, they expanded this space to over 62,000 sq ft.

In November 2018, 150 years after the company was established at Barton Arcade, H.G. Stephenson Ltd were named as the Manchester Evening News Business of the Year in the £10-25 Million Turnover Category.

== Henry George Stephensons ==
Born in 1847, Henry George Stephenson grew up in the Staffordshire town of Hanley on Lamb Street. His mother, Naomi Stephenson (née Bull), was financially independent, a rarity in those times. Henry's parents divorced when he was 10 years old, and by this time, Naomi already ran a successful and thriving millinery and dressmaking business.

Henry's mother died in 1866. His father, who had become estranged to him, had died 3 years previously. Henry was 18 years old, and his younger sister was just 12. By this time, however, Henry had started trading as a ceramic dealer on Salford's Flat Iron Market. Two years later, he would move the business into Manchester's Barton Arcade.

In 1876, Henry married Mary Agnes Malpas. The couple had 11 children between 1877 and 1895. They briefly lived in Cheetham Hill, before moving to Clowes Street in Broughton, Salford. In 1886 the family moved to Kensington House on the promenade in Blackpool, and in 1893 the family moved back to Broughton and into Park Point.

As the children grew up, Henry's sons joined the family business and it moved from strength to strength during 1900 and 1914, becoming a limited company in 1900.

Henry Stephenson died on 4 February 1919, at the age of 71. He was buried in the same grave as his wife Mary as St Paul's Church in Kersal. His sons carried on the family business, passing it down from generation to generation, and it remains in the family to this day.

== History Timeline ==
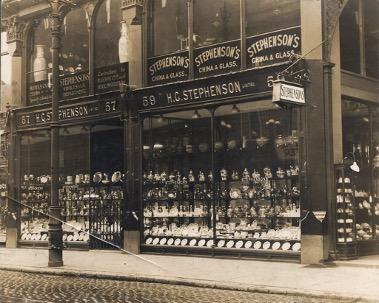
The original Stephensons Barton Arcade store windows facing out onto Deansgate, c.1900

1900-1930

On 23 April 1900, Henry registered his business as a limited company, its official name now becoming ‘H.G. Stephenson, Limited’. Later, Henry's sons Harry and Vincent —known as Vincie— were appointed as directors with Henry as the Chairman of the Board of Directors and majority shareholder in the company.

By 1902 there was a wholesalers showroom in the Barton Arcade store, and by 1905 the company opened a new shop in Piccadilly, Manchester — an area now known as Piccadilly Gardens.

The outbreak of the First World War in 1914 saw some changes. Henry's three sons Harry, Reggie, and Geoff left to serve in the army, and Teddy had emigrated to Australia to join the armed forces there. Later that year, the St Ann's Square store that Harry had managed closed.

Henry's other son Ernest became a director in 1915 in his brothers’ absences. He worked alongside his father and brother Vincie to manage the business. By 1918 Henry's health had started to deteriorate, leaving Ernest and Vincie to take the helm. During this time there was also the flu pandemic, creating even more stress during this period. Henry died in 1919.

After their father's death and the return of the brothers from WW1, Harry became the new Chairman of the Board. Vincie became the new Managing Director, stepping into his father's shoes to run the business. Ernest became the Manager of the Wholesale Department, and Geoff was elected as a Director.

In 1922, Vincie was dismissed by his brothers as Managing Director for embezzlement. Ernest was then appointed as Managing Director, and Geoff became Assistant Manager of the Retail department within the following 12 months.

Stephensons were offered £1,000 in 1926 to terminate the lease for the Piccadilly shop, and they accepted. This was to make way for the newly formed BBC that wished to situate a local broadcasting station in the same building. This year also saw some unrest with the eight-day general strike brought about by miner's who were protesting a decrease in wages and increase in working hours.

Between 1927 and 1930 there were more tensions between brothers, with Harry being suspicious of Geoff's spending. This resulted in Harry stepping down as Chairman, with Reggie taking his place. He remained as a Director, however, and continued to express his concerns over Geoff. In 1930, Geoff was dismissed due to misappropriation of funds, and he moved to Montreal, Canada, where he remained for the rest of his life.

1930-1990

The start of the 1930s was a challenging time due to the Great Depression impacting consumer spending habits, which had been severely reduced. Gradually, the company was reshaping its business to accommodate changing demands. In 1933, Reggie resigned as Chairman, with his brother Edgar taking over. Edgar's son, Harold, joined the company in 1933 and he became a director in 1939. At the end of 1938, Harry and Reggie resigned from their positions as directors. In October 1939, Harold left to join the army at the start of World War 2.

On 23 December 1940, the Barton Arcade was hit by a bomb during an air raid. Further wartime disruptions resulted in the Barton Arcade store to be emptied of goods to save payment of rates. However, the wholesale department carried on trading from a sub-basement at the Barton Arcade.

While the second World War had certainly been difficult, H.G. Stephenson Limited thrived in the early 1950s, despite ongoing rationing in the earlier part of the decade. The company also started attending exhibitions such as the Brighter Homes Exhibition at Manchester City Hall in 1951.

In September 1961, the company closed the retail side of the business and focused on wholesale. In 1963, Michael Stephenson, Harold's son, joined the business at age 16. During this decade, the company began to add bar sundries, cleaning chemicals, and other essentials that were vital to the businesses it sold to.

99 years after H.G. Stephenson moved into Barton Arcade, the business relocated to Kennerley Works in Stockport in 1967. Michael Stephenson became the Managing Director in 1970. He reintroduced retail sales and begins to shape the business as a one-stop-shop for catering and hospitality equipment.

Michael became the Chairman of the Board in the early 1980s, but the recession of the period, referred to as The Winter of Discontent, resulted in more turbulent times for Stephensons. Things had started to turn around for the business in the second half of the decade, however.

1990-Present

In 1991, Michael Lewis of Yates was appointed as a non-executive board member. The business landscape was changing at this time, and Stephensons began to focus on developing strong relationships with regional breweries including J.W. Lees, Joseph Holt, Robinsons, Hydes, and Thwaites. In 1994, retail was reintroduced at Kennerley Works, with a showroom opening at this site.

Julian-Lewis Booth, Michael's stepson, joined the business in 1998 and set up computer networks for the company. Today www.stephensons.com showcases their products and provides an online retail space for customers. His brother Henry Stephenson joined the team in 2005 as Marketing Director, and as a fifth generation Stephenson to come on board. In 2006, Stephensons launched its website to keep up with 21st century changes.

In 2009, Henry took over as Managing Director and started to make further alterations to operations, including introducing a fleet of drivers working directly for Stephensons, rather than outsourcing to a transport firm.

2013 saw the expansion of the Kennerley Works site, putting it at over 30,000 square feet. In 2015, further space was made with the acquisition of a 13,500 square foot warehouse in Cheadle. Stephensons celebrated its 150th anniversary in 2018, and was also named Manchester Evening News — Best Business of the Year.

Stephensons expanded their Cheadle warehouse in 2022 to over 62,000 square feet to accommodate increasing customer demand and business growth.
