= Michael Oliver =

Michael Oliver may refer to:

- Michael Oliver (cardiologist) (1925–2015), British cardiologist
- Michael Kelway Oliver (1925–2004), Canadian academic, political organizer and president of Carleton University
- Michael Oliver (writer, broadcaster) (1937–2002), BBC broadcaster, writer and journalist on classical music
- Michael Roderick Oliver (born 1938), English businessman
- Michael Oliver (Lord Mayor) (born 1940), Lord Mayor of London, 2001–2002
- Mike Oliver (disability advocate) (1945–2019), British academic and disability advocate
- Michael Oliver (footballer, born 1957), Scottish football player and manager
- Michael Oliver (footballer, born 1975) English footballer with Stockport, Darlington and Rochdale
- Michael Oliver (actor) (born 1981), American actor
- Michael Oliver (referee) (born 1985), English football referee
- Michael Oliver, founder of the Republic of Minerva and the Phoenix Foundation

== See also ==
- Mike Oliver (disambiguation)
