= Michael Roderick Oliver =

English businessman and philanthropist

Michael Roderick Oliver (born September 1938), OBE is an English businessman, philanthropist and chairman of four Cheshire based companies – Oliver Valves, Oliver Valvetek, Oliver Twinsafe and Oliver Hydcovalves– which manufacture high-pressure valves for the oil and gas sector.

== Business career ==
Michael Oliver established his first business, Oliver Valves, in 1979 in a one-car garage at his home in Hale, Cheshire, England. The business began by producing a single product – an innovative severe-service needle valve. Today, the three companies sell over 400,000 valves a year, employ over 280 people worldwide and operate through offices in several locations around the world, including Dubai, Kuala Lumpur. The companies’ customers are major energy companies including Petrobras and Exxon. The 2013 Sunday Times Rich List placed him as Britain's 169th richest person with an estimated £517million fortune. He was awarded the Order of the British Empire by the Queen at Buckingham Palace in 2012 and has been a Deputy Lieutenant of Cheshire since 2011. He was awarded an Honorary Doctorate of Engineering by the University of Chester for his services to Engineering in 2013.

== Philanthropy ==
Oliver is a long-term supporter of a wide range of charities in the North West of England, nationally and internationally:

- Oliver recently established the Michael Oliver Foundation, which supports carers living in the Cheshire area.
- In 2011, he helped fund the creation of a memorial to the Canadian aircrews who fought alongside the Royal Air Force during World War II, located at the National Memorial Arboretum in Staffordshire.
- To raise funds for the Bomber Command Memorial in Green Park, he bought and donated a limited edition maquette sculpture to the Royal Air Force Benevolent Fund for permanent display at the RAF Club in Piccadilly, London, and pledged to fund half of any future costs to ensure it is well maintained.
- Also donating to the Royal Air Force Benevolent Fund, Oliver bought a Row2Recovery boat originally used by a six-man crew of former British soldiers for a 3,000-mile cross-Atlantic challenge. He then returned it to the crew to be used again for a nominal fee of £1.
- Oliver is a key donor to Greater Manchester charity Wood Street Mission, donating two vans to the charity in 2013.
- Various donations to Destination Florida, a Manchester-based charity, have been made, including directly funding a trip to Florida for numerous sick children along with their doctors and carers.
- Pictor Academy in Manchester, a school for children with special educational needs, were donated a specially adapted Variety Sunshine Coach along with a number of tablet computers for the classrooms.

== Automobile and aircraft collection ==
Oliver has a large collection of automobile, motorcycles, aircraft and aircraft engines and his collection also includes the late Fred Dibnah's traction engine.
