= Zuurman =

Zuurman is a Dutch surname. Notable people with the surname include:

- Bert Zuurman (born 1973), Dutch footballer
- Mike Zuurman (born 1974), Dutch biologist and programmer
