= Lincoln House, Manchester =

Former building in Manchester, England

Coordinates: 53.4801°N 2.2481°W

Lincoln House
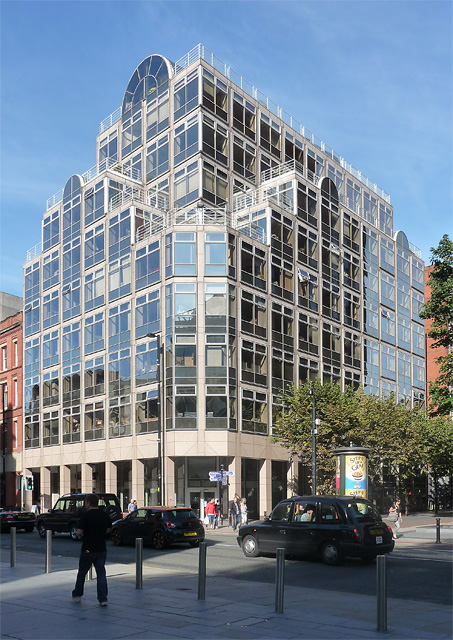
- Lincoln House from Deansgate

General information
- Type: Office
- Architectural style: Postmodernism
- Location: Deansgate, Manchester, United Kingdom
- Completed: 1986
- Demolished: 2017

Design and construction
- Architect: Holford Associates

Lincoln House was an office building on Deansgate in Manchester, England. It was designed in the 1980s by Holford Associates. It was completely clad in glass and was designed as a deliberate response to the 1960s and 1970s Brutalist architecture common in many British cities. It was built in 1986 for the Lincoln House Chambers, a legal practice based in Manchester.

By the 1980s, the Manchester City Council Planning Department rejected Brutalist proposals in the city believing such buildings to be cold and depressing pieces of architecture. The department were instead inclined to approve safe architecture such as brick buildings. Holford Associates set about fulfilling this move forward by proposing a glass building which demonstrated the latest technologies and improvements in neoprene sealants.

It was demolished in 2017, as part of a redevelopment called 125 Deansgate.
