= Arthur Kirkland =

Arthur Kirkland may refer to:

- Arthur Kirkland, a fictional character from the film ...And Justice for All
- Arthur Kirkland, the national personification of England (and the United Kingdom) from the webmanga series Hetalia: Axis Powers

== See also ==
- Arthur (disambiguation)
- Kirkland (disambiguation)
