= Mikes =

Mikes may refer to:

- MIKES, Centre for Metrology and Accreditation, Finland, a research organisation
- Mikes (restaurant), a Canadian restaurant chain
- Mikes (surname), a surname
- Mikes, the Hungarian name for Miceşti village, Tureni Commune, Cluj County, Romania
- Mass-analyzed ion-kinetic-energy spectrometry in mass spectrometry

== See also ==
- Mike (disambiguation)
- Mike's Hard Lemonade Co.
- Mike's Hot Honey
