= Myke =

Myke is a masculine given name. Notable people with the name include:

- Myke Cole, American author
- Myke Henry (born 1992), American basketball player
- Myke Hideous (born 1966), American gothic rock singer and songwriter
- Myke Horton (born 1954), American football player
- Myke Hurley (born 1988), British podcaster
- Myke Ramos (born 1992), Brazilian footballer
- Myke Roy (born 1950), Canadian composer and recording engineer
- Myke Scavone (born 1949), American harmonica player and vocalist
- Myke Tavarres (born 1992), American football player
- Myke Towers (born 1994), Puerto Rican rapper

== See also ==
- Mike (given name)
