= Like Mike (disambiguation) =

Like Mike is a 2002 film directed by John Schultz.

Like Mike may also refer to:

- Like Mike (soundtrack), soundtrack album of the 2002 film
- Like Mike 2: Streetball, American direct-to-video film sequel to Like Mike
- Like Mike (DJ), real name Michael Thivaios, part of the Belgian DJ duo Dimitri Vegas & Like Mike

== See also ==
- I Like Mike (disambiguation)
- "Be Like Mike", 1992 commercial featuring Michael Jordan
