= E. A. Wallis Budge bibliography =

The bibliography of E. A. Wallis Budge (1857–1934), the British Egyptologist and Orientalist, is presented here in chronological order. It includes first editions of separately published books, translations, edited texts and other independently issued volumes published during his lifetime. Multi-volume works are generally listed under the year in which their first volume appeared.

Budge's works have been repeatedly reprinted, revised, excerpted, retitled and issued in facsimile editions, both during and after his lifetime. Later reprints and most subsequent editions—including numerous modern editions issued by Dover Publications—are not individually listed here unless noted to distinguish a substantially revised edition or a variant title.

== Books ==
- Archaic Classics. Assyrian Texts: Being Extracts from the Annals of Shalmaneser II, Sennacherib, and Assur-bani-pal, with Philological Notes. London: Trübner and Co., 1880.
- The History of Esarhaddon (Son of Sennacherib), King of Assyria, B.C. 681–668: Translated from the Cuneiform Inscriptions upon Cylinders and Tablets in the British Museum Collection, Together with Original Texts, a Grammatical Analysis of Each Word, Explanations of the Ideographs by Extracts from the Bi-lingual Syllabaries, and List of Eponyms, Etc. Trübner's Oriental Series. London: Trübner and Co., 1880.
- Babylonian Life and History. By-Paths of Bible Knowledge, no. 4. London: Religious Tract Society, 1884. (2nd ed., rewritten and enlarged, 1925.)
- The Sarcophagus of Ānkhnesrāneferāb, Queen of Ȧḥmes II, King of Egypt, about B.C. 564–526. London: Whiting and Co., 1885.
- An Egyptian Reading Book. London: D. Nutt, 1888.
- The Martyrdom and Miracles of Saint George of Cappadocia: The Coptic Texts, Edited with an English Translation. London: D. Nutt, 1888.
- The History of Alexander the Great, Being the Syriac Version of the Pseudo-Callisthenes. Edited and translated by E. A. Wallis Budge. Cambridge: At the University Press, 1889.
- The Nile: Notes for Travellers in Egypt. London: Thos. Cook and Son, 1890.
- Some Account of the Collection of Egyptian Antiquities in the Possession of Lady Meux, of Theobald's Park, Waltham Cross. London: Harrison and Sons, 1893. (2nd ed., with thirty-four plates, 1896.)
- The Book of Governors: The Historia Monastica of Thomas, Bishop of Margâ, A.D. 840, Edited from Syriac Manuscripts in the British Museum and Other Libraries. Edited and translated by E. A. Wallis Budge. 2 vols. London: Kegan Paul, Trench, Trübner & Co., 1893.
- The Mummy: Chapters on Egyptian Funereal Archaeology. Cambridge: Cambridge University Press, 1893. (2nd ed., rev. and greatly enlarged, retitled The Mummy: A Handbook of Egyptian Funerary Archaeology, 1925.)
- Saint Michael the Archangel: Three Encomiums by Theodosius, Archbishop of Alexandria; Severus, Patriarch of Antioch; and Eustathius, Bishop of Trake; the Coptic Texts, with Extracts from Arabic and Ethiopic Versions. Edited and translated by E. A. Wallis Budge. London: Kegan Paul, Trench, Trübner & Co., 1894.
- First Steps in Egyptian: A Book for Beginners. London: Kegan Paul, Trench, Trübner & Co., 1895.
- The Book of the Dead: The Papyrus of Ani in the British Museum; the Egyptian Text with Interlinear Transliteration and Translation, a Running Translation, Introduction, Etc. London: Printed by Order of the Trustees of the British Museum; sold by Longmans and Co., 1895.
- An Egyptian Reading Book for Beginners: Being a Series of Historical, Funereal, Moral, Religious, and Mythological Texts Printed in Hieroglyphic Characters, Together with a Transliteration and a Complete Vocabulary. London: Kegan Paul, Trench, Trübner & Co., 1896.
- Cuneiform Texts from Babylonian Tablets, &c., in the British Museum. Part I. London: Printed by Order of the Trustees of the British Museum, 1896.
- The Life and Exploits of Alexander the Great: Being a Series of Translations of the Ethiopic Histories of Alexander by the Pseudo-Callisthenes and Other Writers, with Introduction, Etc. Edited and translated by E. A. Wallis Budge. 2 vols. London: C. J. Clay and Sons, 1896.
- The Laughable Stories Collected by Mâr Gregory John Bar-Hebræus: The Syriac Text Edited with an English Translation. Edited and translated by E. A. Wallis Budge. London: Luzac and Co., 1897.
- The Earliest Known Coptic Psalter: The Text, in the Dialect of Upper Egypt, Edited from the Unique Papyrus Codex Oriental 5000 in the British Museum. Edited by E. A. Wallis Budge. London: Kegan Paul, Trench, Trübner & Co., 1898.
- The Book of the Dead: The Chapters of Coming Forth by Day. The Egyptian Text According to the Theban Recension, in Hieroglyphic, Edited from Numerous Papyri, with a Translation, Vocabulary, Etc. Translated and edited by E. A. Wallis Budge. 3 vols. London: Kegan Paul, Trench, Trübner & Co., 1898.
- The Lives of Maba Seyon and Gabra Krestos: The Ethiopic Texts. Edited and translated by E. A. Wallis Budge. Lady Meux Manuscripts, no. 1. London: W. Griggs, 1898.
- Egyptian Religion: Egyptian Ideas of the Future Life. Books on Egypt and Chaldæa, vol. 1. London: Kegan Paul, Trench, Trübner & Co., 1899.
- Egyptian Magic. Books on Egypt and Chaldæa, vol. 2. London: Kegan Paul, Trench, Trübner & Co., 1899.
- The Contendings of the Apostles, Being the Histories of the Lives and Martyrdoms and Deaths of the Twelve Apostles and Evangelists: The Ethiopic Texts Now First Edited from Manuscripts in the British Museum, with an English Translation. Edited and translated by E. A. Wallis Budge. 2 vols. London: Henry Frowde, 1899–1901.
- Lady Meux Manuscripts, Nos. 2–5: The Miracles of the Blessed Virgin Mary, and the Life of Hannâ (Saint Anne), and the Magical Prayers of ’Aḥĕta Mîkâêl: The Ethiopic Texts, Edited with English Translations, Etc. Edited and translated by E. A. Wallis Budge. London: W. Griggs, 1900.
- Annals of the Kings of Assyria: The Cuneiform Texts, with Translations, Transliterations, Etc., from the Original Documents in the British Museum. Edited by E. A. Wallis Budge and L. W. King. Vol. 1. London: Printed by Order of the Trustees of the British Museum, 1902.
- A History of Egypt from the End of the Neolithic Period to the Death of Cleopatra VII, B.C. 30. 8 vols. London: Kegan Paul, Trench, Trübner & Co., 1902.
- The Histories of Rabban Hôrmîzd the Persian and Rabban Bar-'Idtâ, the Founder of the Monastery of Qûqâ: The Syriac Texts, Edited with English Translations. Edited and translated by E. A. Wallis Budge. 2 vols. London: Luzac and Co., 1902.
- The Gods of the Egyptians; or, Studies in Egyptian Mythology. 2 vols. London: Methuen & Co., 1904.
- The Egyptian Heaven and Hell. 3 vols. Books on Egypt and Chaldæa, vols. 20–22. London: Kegan Paul, Trench, Trübner & Co., 1905.
- The Egyptian Sûdân: Its History and Monuments. 2 vols. London: Kegan Paul, Trench, Trübner & Co., 1907.
- The Paradise or Garden of the Holy Fathers: Being Histories of the Anchorites, Recluses, Monks, Coenobites, and Ascetic Fathers of the Deserts of Egypt. Translated by E. A. Wallis Budge. 2 vols. London: Chatto and Windus, 1907.
- The Book of the Kings of Egypt; or, The Ka, Nebti, Ḥeru, Suten Bāt, and Rā Names of the Pharaohs, with Transliterations, from Menes, the First Dynastic King of Egypt, to the Emperor Decius, with Chapters on the Royal Names, Chronology, Etc. 2 vols. London: Kegan Paul, Trench, Trübner & Co., 1908.
- Texts Relating to Saint Mêna of Egypt and Canons of Nicaea in a Nubian Dialect: With Facsimile. Edited by E. A. Wallis Budge. London: Printed by Order of the Trustees of the British Museum, 1909.
- The Liturgy of Funerary Offerings: The Egyptian Texts with English Translations. Edited and translated by E. A. Wallis Budge. Books on Egypt and Chaldæa, vol. 25. London: Kegan Paul, Trench, Trübner & Co., 1909.
- Osiris and the Egyptian Resurrection. 2 vols. London: Philip Lee Warner; New York: G. P. Putnam's Sons, 1911.
- Legends of the Gods: The Egyptian Texts, Edited with Translations. Edited and translated by E. A. Wallis Budge. Books on Egypt and Chaldæa, vol. 32. London: Kegan Paul, Trench, Trübner & Co., 1912.
- The Rosetta Stone. London: Printed by Order of the Trustees of the British Museum, 1913.
- Syrian Anatomy, Pathology and Therapeutics, or "The Book of Medicines": The Syriac Text, Edited from a Rare Manuscript, with an English Translation, Etc. Edited and translated by E. A. Wallis Budge. 2 vols. London: Oxford University Press, Humphrey Milford, 1913.
- Coptic Apocrypha in the Dialect of Upper Egypt, Edited, with English Translations. Edited and translated by E. A. Wallis Budge. Coptic Texts, vol. 3. London: Printed by Order of the Trustees of the British Museum, 1913.
- The Literature of the Ancient Egyptians. London: J. M. Dent and Sons, 1914.
- Coptic Martyrdoms, Etc., in the Dialect of Upper Egypt, Edited, with English Translations. Edited and translated by E. A. Wallis Budge. Coptic Texts, vol. 4. London: Printed by Order of the Trustees of the British Museum, 1914.
- Assyrian Sculptures in the British Museum: Reign of Ashur-nasir-pal, 885–860 B.C. With Fifty-three Plates. Edited by E. A. Wallis Budge. London: Printed by Order of the Trustees of the British Museum, 1914.
- Miscellaneous Coptic Texts in the Dialect of Upper Egypt, Edited with English Translations. Edited and translated by E. A. Wallis Budge. Coptic Texts, vol. 5. London: Printed by Order of the Trustees of the British Museum, 1915.
- An Egyptian Hieroglyphic Dictionary: With an Index of English Words, King List and Geographical List with Indexes, List of Hieroglyphic Characters, Coptic and Semitic Alphabets, Etc. 2 vols. London: John Murray, 1920.
- By Nile and Tigris: A Narrative of Journeys in Egypt and Mesopotamia on Behalf of the British Museum between the Years 1886 and 1913. 2 vols. London: John Murray, 1920.
- The Queen of Sheba and Her Only Son Menyelek: Being the "Book of the Glory of Kings" (Kebra Nagast). Translated by E. A. Wallis Budge. London: Medici Society, 1922. (2nd ed., abridged, London: Oxford University Press, Humphrey Milford, 1932.)
- Tutankhamen: Amenism, Atenism and Egyptian Monotheism, with Hieroglyphic Texts of Hymns to Amen and Aten. London: Martin Hopkinson and Co., 1923.
- Facsimiles of Egyptian Hieratic Papyri in the British Museum. Second Series. London: Printed by Order of the Trustees of the British Museum, 1923.
- Cleopatra's Needles and Other Egyptian Obelisks: A Series of Descriptions of All the Important Inscribed Obelisks, with Hieroglyphic Texts, Translations, Etc. London: Religious Tract Society, 1926.
- The Book of the Cave of Treasures: A History of the Patriarchs and the Kings, Their Successors, from the Creation to the Crucifixion of Christ, Translated from the Syriac Text of the British Museum MS. Add. 25875. Translated by E. A. Wallis Budge. London: Religious Tract Society, 1927.
- A History of Ethiopia: Nubia and Abyssinia, According to the Hieroglyphic Inscriptions of Egypt and Nubia, and the Ethiopian Chronicles. 2 vols. London: Methuen & Co., 1928.
- The Divine Origin of the Craft of the Herbalist. London: The Society of Herbalists, 1928.
- The Monks of Kûblâi Khân, Emperor of China; or, The History of the Life and Travels of Rabban Sâwmâ, Envoy and Plenipotentiary of the Mongol Khans to the Kings of Europe, and Markos Who as Mâr Yahbh-Allâhâ III Became Patriarch of the Nestorian Church in Asia. Translated by E. A. Wallis Budge. London: Religious Tract Society, 1928.
- "Mike," the Cat Who Assisted in Keeping the Main Gate of the British Museum from February 1909 to January 1929. Bungay, Suffolk: Printed by R. Clay and Sons for the Author, 1929.
- Amulets and Superstitions: The Original Texts with Translations and Descriptions of a Long Series of Egyptian, Sumerian, Assyrian, Hebrew, Christian, Gnostic and Muslim Amulets and Talismans and Magical Figures, with Chapters on the Evil Eye, the Origin of the Amulet, the Pentagon, the Swastika, the Cross (Pagan and Christian), the Properties of Stones, Rings, Divination, Numbers, the Kabbâlâh, Ancient Astrology, Etc. London: Oxford University Press, Humphrey Milford, 1930.
- Egyptian Tales and Romances: Pagan, Christian and Muslim. London: Thornton Butterworth, 1931.
- From Fetish to God in Ancient Egypt. London: Oxford University Press, 1934.
