= The Moon Under Water, Manchester =

Pub in Manchester, England

The Moon Under Water
- The pub in 2014
- Former names: Deansgate Picture House; Cannon Deansgate

General information
- Type: Public house; originally a cinema
- Location: 68–74 Deansgate, Manchester, England
- Coordinates: 53.4829°N 2.2471°W
- Opened: January 1914; 112 years ago (as a cinema); 15 August 1995; 31 years ago (as a pub)
- Owner: JD Wetherspoon

Technical details
- Floor area: 8,800 sq ft (820 m^{2})

Website
- Official website

The Moon Under Water is a public house on Deansgate in Manchester city centre, England, in the building of the former Deansgate Picture House cinema (an ABC cinema); it is one of the largest pubs in the United Kingdom. The pub is 8,800 square feet (820 m^{2}) and can hold 1,700 customers.

It is owned by the pub chain JD Wetherspoon who opened it on 15 August 1995, and named it after George Orwell's 1946 essay, "The Moon Under Water", describing his ideal pub. It is one of 15 Wetherspoon pubs with the same name.
