= E. A. Wallis Budge =

British academic (1857–1934)

Sir E. A. Wallis Budge
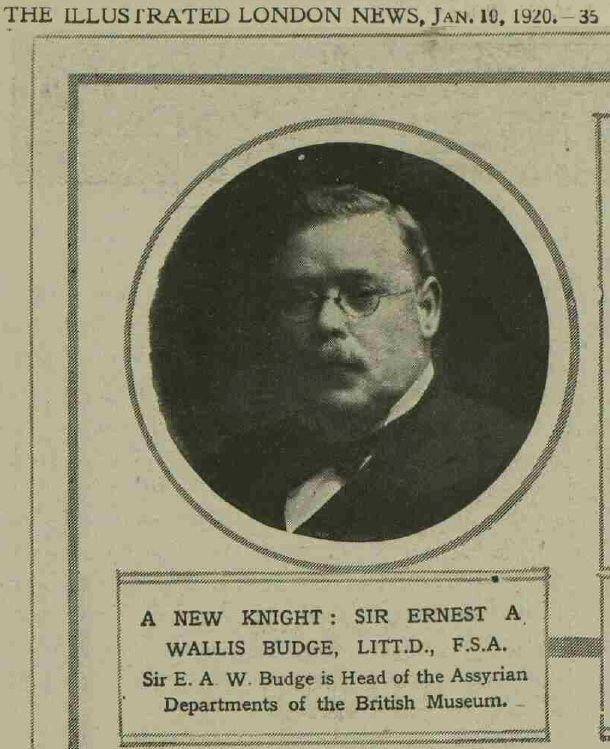
- Article announcing Budge's knighthood, 1920
- Born: Ernest Alfred Thompson Wallis Budge; 27 July 1857; Bodmin, Cornwall, UK
- Died: 23 November 1934 (aged 77); London, UK
- Education: University of Cambridge
- Scientific career
- Fields: Egyptology, philology

Sir Ernest Alfred Thompson Wallis Budge (27 July 1857 – 23 November 1934) was an English Egyptologist, Orientalist, and philologist who worked for the British Museum and published numerous works on the ancient Near East. He made numerous trips to Egypt and Anglo-Egyptian Sudan on behalf of the British Museum to buy antiquities, and helped it build its collection of cuneiform tablets, manuscripts, and papyri. He published many books on Egyptology, helping to bring the findings to larger audiences. In 1920, he was knighted for his service to Egyptology and the British Museum.

== Early life and education ==
E. A. Wallis Budge was born in 1857 in Bodmin, Cornwall, to Mary Ann Budge, a young woman whose father was a waiter in a Bodmin hotel. Budge's father has never been identified. Budge left Cornwall as a boy, and eventually came to live with his maternal aunt and grandmother in London.

Budge became interested in languages before he was ten years old, but left school at the age of twelve in 1869. He worked as a clerk at the retail firm of W. H. Smith, from 1870 to 1878. In his spare time, he studied Biblical Hebrew and Syriac with the aid of Charles Seager.

Spending time in the British Museum, from 1872, Budge became interested in learning the ancient Assyrian language in 1872, and introduced himself to Samuel Birch, keeper of Oriental Antiquities there. He met also Birch's assistant, the Assyriologist George Smith. Smith gave Budge some help with his Assyrian, and Birch allowed him to study cuneiform tablets in his office. Through Birch, Budge also had access to the museum's books, such as Austen Henry Layard's Nineveh and Its Remains.

From 1869 to 1878, Budge spent his free time studying Assyrian, and during these years, often spent his lunch break studying at St. Paul's Cathedral. John Stainer, the organist of St. Paul's, noticed Budge's hard work, and met the youth. He wanted to help the working-class boy realize his dream of becoming a scholar. Stainer contacted W. H. Smith, a Conservative member of Parliament, and the former Liberal Prime Minister William Ewart Gladstone, and asked them to help his young friend. Both Smith and Gladstone agreed to help Stainer to raise money for Budge to attend the University of Cambridge.

Budge studied at Christ's College, Cambridge, from 1878 to 1883, graduating B.A. in 1882, M.A. 1885. His subjects included Semitic languages: Hebrew, Syriac, Geʽez and Arabic; he continued to study Assyrian independently. Budge worked closely during these years with William Wright, a noted scholar of Semitic languages, among others.

== Career at the British Museum ==
=== Purchase and publication of antiquities ===
Between 1886 and 1891, Budge was assigned by the British Museum to investigate why cuneiform tablets from British Museum sites in Iraq, which were to be guarded by local agents of the museum, were showing up in the collections of London antiquities dealers. The British Museum was purchasing these collections of what were their "own" tablets at inflated London market rates. Edward Augustus Bond, the principal librarian of the museum, wanted Budge to find the source of the leaks and to seal it. Bond also wanted Budge to establish ties to Iraqi antiquities dealers in order to buy available materials at the reduced local prices, in comparison to those in London. Budge also travelled to Istanbul during these years to obtain a permit from the Ottoman Empire government to reopen the museum's excavations at these Iraqi sites. The museum archaeologists believed that excavations would reveal more tablets.

"Cuneiform Texts From Babylonian Tablets In The British Museum" Volume 1, published 1896

Cover

Preface by Budge

Pages 1 & 2, the first four of 40 artifacts total in the volume

The first volume published by Budge of "Cuneiform Texts From Babylonian Tablets In The British Museum", 1896. This is the first of what would become 58 volumes published from 1896 to 1990, making available the hand drawn copies of each cuneiform tablet. This opened up access to these artifacts, allowing anyone capable of translating these languages to begin that long process. The last was Volume 58, published in 1990.

After Birch's death in 1885, the British Museum increasingly used Budge to buy antiquities. Budge therefore sought to establish ties with dealers in Egypt and Iraq, so that the museum could purchase antiquities from them, and avoid excavations. As cuneiform tablets were collected and catalogued, Budge began the process of having meticulous hand drawn copies made of each cuneiform artifact (transcripts), and in 1896 published the first volume of "Cuneiform Texts From Babylonian Tablets In The British Museum". These published transcripts allowed these artifacts to become "speedily available" to the scientific community, allowing translation and study of the documents by anyone capable of deciphering the languages.

In contrast to the collection methods used by Budge, French archeologist Auguste Mariette and his successor Gaston Maspero opposed illegitimate exports, and managed to slow down the pace at which at which monuments were being destroyed, partly by forbidding all archeological fieldwork other than their own. Yet an illegal trade continued. Budge has been called by Brian M. Fagan "one of the major illegal looters of antiquities". However, Fagan also pointed out that delicate artifacts, such as mummies, held by The British museum would likely receive far better preservation than if they remained in a tomb in Egypt.

Whatever blame may be attached to individual archeologists for removing mummies from Egypt, every unprejudiced person who knows anything of the subject must admit that when once a mummy has passed into the care of the Trustees, and is lodged in the British Museum, it has far better chance of being preserved there than it could possibly have in any tomb, royal or otherwise, in Egypt.

=== Collecting missions ===
Budge carried out three missions to Mesopotamia in the period 1886 to 1892. He was then directed to Egypt, and visited almost every year, for shorter periods of a month or two more compatible with new administrative duties. He also visited the Sudan, five times. He returned from the missions with: large collections of cuneiform tablets; Syriac, Coptic, and Greek manuscripts; and significant collections of hieroglyphic papyri.

On an 1888 trip to Baghdad, Budge was expected to be hosted by the British resident William Tweedie. He ended up staying on the Tigris steamer Comet attached to the residency. Unaware of a recent change of Ottoman customs rules, Budge had his baggage searched. It contained significant cuneiform clay tablets from Tell Amarna. These tablets and others Budge smuggled successfully out of Iraq, by means of bribery. Budge gave his own account of the incident in his memoirs By Nile And Tigris.

Notable acquisitions from this time were: the Papyrus of Ani, a Book of the Dead; a copy of Aristotle's lost Constitution of Athens; and the Amarna letters. Budge's prolific acquisitions gave the British Museum arguably the best Ancient Near East collections in the world, at a time when European museums were competing to build such collections.

In 1900, the Assyriologist Archibald Sayce said to Budge:

What a revolution you have effected in the Oriental Department of the Museum! It is now a veritable history of civilization in a series of object lessons.

Budge became assistant keeper in his department after Renouf retired in 1891, and was confirmed as keeper in 1894. He held this position until 1924, specializing in Egyptology. Budge and collectors for other museums of Europe regarded having the best collection of Egyptian and Assyrian antiquities in the world as a matter of national pride, and there was tremendous competition for such antiquities among them. Museum officials and their local agents smuggled antiquities in diplomatic pouches, bribed customs officials, or simply went to friends or countrymen in the Egyptian Service of Antiquities to ask them to pass their cases of antiquities unopened. During his tenure as keeper, Budge was noted for his kindness and patience in teaching young visitors to the British Museum.

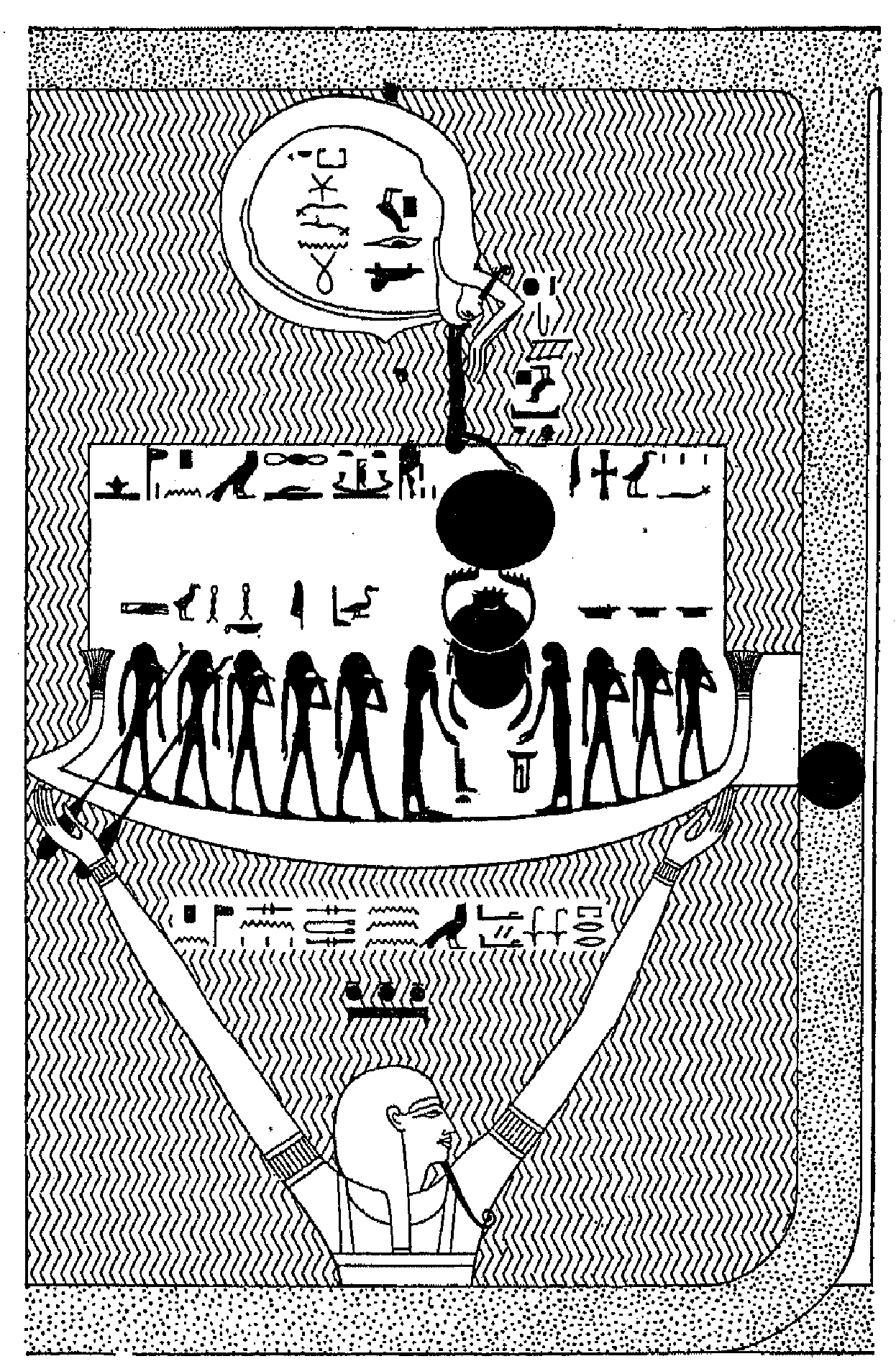
Illustration by Budge from Egyptian Ideas of the Future Life (published 1908).

In 1883, Budge entered the British Museum, working within the recently renamed Department of Egyptian and Assyrian Antiquities. Initially appointed to the Assyrian section, he soon transferred to the Egyptian section. He studied the Egyptian language with Samuel Birch until the latter's death in 1885. Budge continued to study ancient Egyptian with the new keeper, Peter le Page Renouf, until the latter's retirement in 1891.

=== Contention with Rassam ===
Budge's tenure was not without controversy. In 1893, he was sued in the high court by Hormuzd Rassam for both slander and libel. Budge had written that Rassam had used his relatives to smuggle antiquities out of Nineveh and had sent only "rubbish" to the British Museum. The elderly Rassam was upset by these accusations, and when he challenged Budge, he received a partial apology that a later court considered "ungentlemanly". Rassam was supported by the judge but not the jury. After Rassam's death, it was alleged that, while Rassam had made most of the discoveries of antiquities, credit was taken by the staff of the British Museum, notably Austen Henry Layard.

=== Later career ===
Budge was one of the first authors to write about the discovery of the tomb of Tutankhamun, and also one of the first experts to give an analysis of artifacts found there. His observations on the subject were published in The Times. He called the exploit of Howard Carter and his financier Lord Carnarvon a "crowning discovery". In particular, he praised Carnarvon's willingness to financially support the entire venture: "England may congratulate herself that even in these days of the 'Axe' men can be found willing and magnanimous enough to spend treasure merely with the idea of increasing the sum of human knowledge."

He retired from the British Museum in 1924, and lived until 1934.

== Literary and social career ==
Budge was also a prolific author of over 100 books, though they were marred by errors. According to Egyptologist James Peter Allen, Budge's books "were not too reliable when they first appeared and are now woefully outdated." He is known for works on ancient Egyptian religion and his hieroglyphic primers. Budge argued that the religion of Osiris had emerged from an indigenous African people. Budge's contention that the religion of the Egyptians was derived from similar religions of the people of northeastern and central Africa was regarded as impossible by his colleagues. At the time, all but a few scholars followed Flinders Petrie in his theory that the culture of Ancient Egypt was derived from an invading "Dynastic Race", which had conquered Egypt in late prehistory.

Budge's works were widely read by the educated public and among those seeking comparative ethnological data, including James Frazer. He incorporated some of Budge's ideas on Osiris into his ever-growing work on comparative religion, The Golden Bough. Though Budge's books remain widely available, since his day both translation and dating accuracy have improved, leading to significant revisions. The common writing style of his era—a lack of clear distinction between opinion and incontrovertible fact—is no longer acceptable in scholarly works.

Budge was also interested in the paranormal, and believed in spirits and hauntings. Budge had a number of friends in the Ghost Club (British Library, Manuscript Collections, Ghost Club Archives), a group in London committed to the study of alternative religions and the spirit world. He told his many friends stories of hauntings and other uncanny experiences. Many people in his day who were involved with the occult and spiritualism after losing their faith in Christianity were dedicated to Budge's works, particularly his translation of the Egyptian Book of the Dead. Such writers as the poet William Butler Yeats and James Joyce studied and were influenced by this work of ancient religion. Budge's works on Egyptian religion have remained consistently in print since they entered the public domain.

Budge was a member of the literary and open-minded Savile Club in London, proposed by his friend H. Rider Haggard in 1889, and accepted in 1891. He was a much sought-after dinner guest in London, his humorous stories and anecdotes being famous in his circle. He enjoyed the company of the well-born, many of whom he met when they brought to the British Museum the scarabs and statuettes they had purchased while on holiday in Egypt. Budge never lacked for an invitation to a country house in the summer or to a fashionable townhouse during the London season.

In 1920, he published his sprawling autobiography, By Nile and Tigris. His last work was From Fetish to God in Ancient Egypt (1934).

== Awards and honours ==
In 1895, Budge was elected an International Member of the American Philosophical Society. Budge was knighted in the 1920 New Year Honours for his distinguished contributions to Colonial Egyptology and the British Museum.

== Personal life ==
In 1883 Budge married Dora Helen Emerson, who died in 1926.

== Bibliography ==
Budge's books have appeared in many revised, reprinted, and facsimile editions. A chronological bibliography of the original separately published editions is available at E. A. Wallis Budge bibliography.

=== Selected works ===
- The Book of the Dead: The Papyrus of Ani in the British Museum; the Egyptian Text with Interlinear Transliteration and Translation, a Running Translation, Introduction, Etc. London: Printed by Order of the Trustees of the British Museum; sold by Longmans and Co., 1895.
- Egyptian Magic. Books on Egypt and Chaldæa, vol. 2. London: Kegan Paul, Trench, Trübner & Co., 1899.
- The Gods of the Egyptians; or, Studies in Egyptian Mythology. 2 vols. London: Methuen & Co., 1904.
- Osiris and the Egyptian Resurrection. 2 vols. London: Philip Lee Warner; New York: G. P. Putnam's Sons, 1911.
- An Egyptian Hieroglyphic Dictionary: With an Index of English Words, King List and Geographical List with Indexes, List of Hieroglyphic Characters, Coptic and Semitic Alphabets, Etc. 2 vols. London: John Murray, 1920.
- The Queen of Sheba and Her Only Son Menyelek: Being the "Book of the Glory of Kings" (Kebra Nagast). Translated by E. A. Wallis Budge. London: Medici Society, 1922.

== See also ==
- Gebelein predynastic mummies
- List of Egyptologists
- Mike the cat, companion of Wallis Budge, who guarded the courtyard of the British Museum for twenty years
