= James Kirkland =

James or Jim Kirkland may refer to:

- James I. Kirkland (born 1954), American paleontologist
- James Kirkland (boxer) (born 1984), American boxer
- James Hampton Kirkland (1859–1939), American academic
- James Kirkland (giant), Irish soldier with gigantism
- James Robert Kirkland (1903–1958), United States federal judge
- Jim Kirkland (born 1946), English footballer
