= Mike Oliver =

Mike Oliver may refer to:

- Mike Oliver (disability advocate) (1945–2019), British academic and disability advocate
- Mike Oliver (field hockey) (born 1973), field hockey player from Canada

== See also ==
- Michael Oliver (disambiguation)
