= MultiEx Commander =

- Developers: Mike Zuurman; Jeremy Walton; Ben Moench
- Release: v1.07, (August 16, 1999)
- Stable release: 4.6 / November 10, 2022; 3 years ago
- Preview release: None / None
- Written in: Visual Basic
- Operating system: Windows
- Type: File manager
- License: Shareware (Windows)
- Website: multiex.xentax.com

MultiEx Commander was a game resource archive manager for Windows published by the Xentax Foundation. Some features include a built-in MexScript (AKA BMS) interpreter, file extractor and importer, stand alone mod creator EasyMod.

This application is currently written by Mike Zuurman in Visual Basic. The first versions of the program were written in Borland Turbo C in 1998 and 1999 as a user interface for a command line DOS archiving tool, called multiex, that was created in 1997. The program is extensible by programmers via a plugin-API. The first multiex release was built around MexScript, a custom script written specifically to enable programmers to process (game) archives by simply typing a few lines of script. All the low-level events would be carried out by the main program. MexScript (or BMS as it is also called, after Binary MultiEx Script) is still a prominent feature of the tool, as the user can write scripts via the built-in script window. It also enables the use of QuickBMS scripts, a later third party produced improvement (or "forking") of the original MexScript.

Additionally, MultiEx Commander can create stand-alone mods for games via the EasyMod creator. Custom changes made to certain game archives (such as sounds, or textures) are stored as a stand-alone program, enabling users to distribute their mods without others needing MultiEx Commander.

The Windows version is freeware, although it was donateware up until September 2014: users could download it after they donated a certain amount to the Xentax Foundation. As part of the 25th Anniversary of the publisher in 2014, it became free to download.

== History ==
In 1997, the command line MexScript based game archive extraction and importation tool multiex.exe for DOS was programmed using Turbo C. From 1998 through 2001 MultiEx Commander was created as a GUI for multiex.exe with new versions. One can still see the last DOS version (2.3) in action in this video, a version that was released on February 23, 2001. In that same year, the first Windows version was released (3.0b) along with a number of updates to higher versions, a task Mike Zuurman first discussed with fellow programmers. During the years that followed, new versions came out up until version 3.9.68, of which source code was uploaded to SourceForge on October 9, 2003. A brief Open Source development period started, including a major update to version 4.0 on June 29, 2004. This period ended when version 4.2 was completed in August 2005. The current version is 4.5.1, that has "approval" of Duke Nukem (as acted by original Duke Nukem voice actor Jon St. John). As MultiEx Commander was pirated on, and cracks and registration numbers released, it was an on-line only tool, until November 2022. The developer announced the last version (4.6) had been released, that is stand-alone and is used offline. In addition, they stated there would be no more new updates.

== Press ==
The gaming press had received MultiEx Commander with positive articles in hard-copy magazines, such as PC Action, PC Games Hardware and PC Gameplay. PC Gameplay (a leading Belgian game magazine at the time) stated "MultiEx Commander makes modding possible for everyone", while PC Extreme called it "the ultimate game modding utility". In September 2012, a book was released about MultiEx Commander.
