= Kirkland =

Kirkland may refer to:

== Places ==
=== Canada ===
- Kirkland, Quebec, Canada
- Kirkland Island, British Columbia, Canada
- Kirkland Lake, Ontario, Canada

=== United Kingdom ===
- Kirkland, Culgaith, Cumbria, England, a village
- Kirkland, Lamplugh, Cumbria, England, a village
- Kirkland, Woodside, Cumbria, England, a hamlet
- Kirkland, Kendal, Cumbria, England, a former parish now in Kendal
- Kirkland, Lancashire, England, a parish
- Kirkland, Dumfries and Galloway, Scotland, a location
  - Kirkland railway station, a former station there
- Kirkland, Fife, Scotland; a former village, absorbed by Methil

=== United States ===
- Kirkland, Arizona, an unincorporated community
- Kirkland, Georgia, an unincorporated community
- Kirkland, Illinois, a village
- Kirkland Township, Adams County, Indiana, a township
- Kirkland, New York, a town
- Kirkland, North Carolina, a census-designated place
- Kirkland, Lincoln County, Tennessee, an unincorporated community
- Kirkland, Williamson County, Tennessee, an unincorporated community
- Kirkland, Texas, an unincorporated community
- Kirkland, Washington, a city

== People ==
- Kirkland Russell, Bahamian politician
- Kirkland (surname)

== Brands and enterprises ==
- Kirkland & Ellis, a law firm in the United States, based in Chicago, Illinois
- Kirkland Signature, the private-label store brand of Costco
- Kirkland's, a retail chain in the United States that sells home decor

== Education ==
- Kirkland High School and Community College, Methil, Scotland
- Kirkland College, a former college in New York, now merged with Hamilton College
- Kirkland House, one of the 12 undergraduate houses at Harvard University

== Other ==
- Kirkland (horse), 1905 Grand National winner
- Kirkland Bushwhackers, an irregular military force during the American Civil War and the Reconstruction era
