= Michael Wallace =

Michael Wallace (or Mike or Mick) may refer to:

== Politics ==
- Michael Wallace (politician) (c. 1744–1831), Scottish-born merchant, judge and political figure in Nova Scotia
- Mick Wallace (born 1955), Irish politician, football manager and property developer
- Mike Wallace (politician) (born 1963), Canadian politician

== Sports ==
- Mike Wallace (baseball) (born 1951), American baseball player
- Mike Wallace (racing driver) (born 1959), American race car driver
- Mike Wallace (American football) (born 1986), American football wide receiver
- Red Wallace (Michael Wallace, 1918–1977), American professional basketball player
- Mick Wallace (footballer) (born 1970), English footballer

== Other people ==
- Michael Wallace (piper) (fl. late 1800s), Irish musician
- Michael Wallace (lawyer) (born 1951), American lawyer
- Michael Wallace (1961–2000), a murder victim who was poisoned by Stacey Castor
- Mike Wallace (1918–2012), American television correspondent
- Mike Wallace (historian) (1942–2026), American historian

== See also ==
- Michael Wallis (born 1945), American historian
