= Mike Strug =

American television news personality

Mike Strug is a retired television news reporter and personality from Philadelphia.

The Broadcast Pioneers of Philadelphia inducted Strug into their Hall of Fame in 2008.
