= Mike Baur =

American sculptor

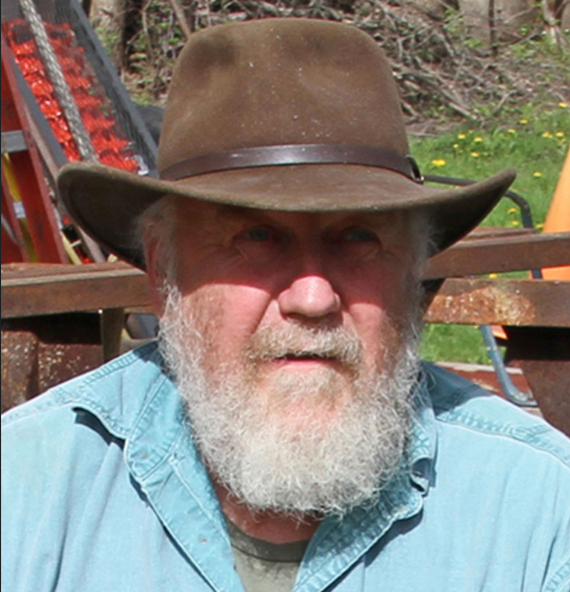
- Born: 1951 (age 74–75); Kansas City, KS, USA
- Education: Arkansas State University (BFA 1973) University of Illinois (MFA 1975)
- Occupation: Abstract Sculptor
- Website: MikeBaurSculpture.com

Mike Baur (born 1951) is an American sculptor, working with steel, concrete, stone, cast metals, wood and plastic.

== Life and career ==
Mike Baur grew up in Southern Missouri, where his father served as a Baptist minister in various small-town congregations. His interest in art was sparked by a childhood encounter with a photograph of a Jackson Pollock painting. After leaving high school at the age of 16 to work at a sawmill, Baur pursued his education at Arkansas State University, where he earned a Bachelor of Fine Arts in 1973. He then completed a Master of Fine Arts in Sculpture at the University of Illinois Urbana-Champaign in 1976. During his time in Urbana, he transitioned from plastic casting to working with concrete and steel, gaining international recognition in 1974 with a 100-ton concrete sculpture titled Idle, located near Barcelona, Spain.

Baur established his studio in Chicago in 1976. He was represented by Zriny-Hayes Gallery from 1976 to 1981 and Sonia Zaks Gallery from 1981 to 2003. From 2008 to 2013, his work was represented by OK Harris Works of Art in New York.

Baur began his career in public sculpture with Idle in 1974. He has continued to pursue public commissions, with large pieces located in Illinois, Indiana, and Iowa. The Chicago Tribune has described his work as creating "magic from concrete and steel." His work spans various media, including steel, concrete, stone, cast metals, wood, and plastic, reflecting a deep exploration of these materials' inherent qualities.

In June 2025, Baur installed Guardians, a two-part cast concrete and steel sculpture at Johnson’s Mound Forest Preserve in Kane County, Illinois. Commissioned for the Forest Preserve District’s centennial, the work reflects themes of renewal, resilience, and guardianship found in Midwestern woodlands.

== Collections and public art ==
- Johnson’s Mound Forest Preserve, Kane County, IL (2025) – Guardians, a cast concrete and steel sculpture commemorating the Kane County Forest Preserve District’s centennial.
- Lincoln Land Community College, Springfield, IL (2021)
- Parker, Colorado (2018)
- University of Northern Iowa, Cedar Falls, IA (2015)
- Chicago Police Headquarters (2007)
- Nathan Manilow Sculpture Park, Governor’s State University, University Park, IL (2006)
- Lake Land College, Mattoon, IL (2004)
- Rio Grande University, Rio Grande, OH (2004)
- Elgin Community College, Elgin, IL (2003)
- Illinois Department of Natural Resources, Springfield, IL (2003)
- Rockford Museum, Rockford, IL (2002)
- College of DuPage, Fine Arts Building, Glen Ellyn, IL (1992)
- Northpoint Marina Collection, Winthrop Harbor, IL (1990)
- Illinois Mathematics & Science Academy Collection, Aurora, IL (1988)
- Illinois Collection, State of Illinois Building, Chicago, IL (1988)
- Sears/Unibank, Chicago, IL (1988)
- Autopistas del Mediterraneo, Barcelona, Spain (1974)
