= Mike (cat) =

British Museum 'guardian' cat (1908–1929)

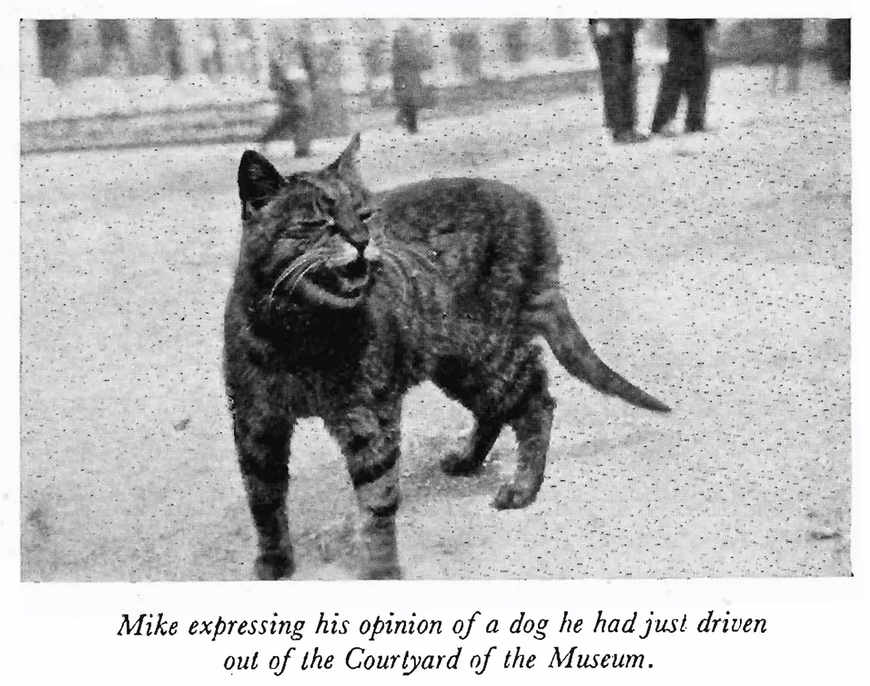
- Species: Felis catus
- Sex: Male
- Born: c.1908 Great Britain
- Died: January 1929 (aged 20–21); London, England
- Known for: Guardian of the British Museum

Mike (c. 1908 – January 1929) was a cat who guarded the gates of the British Museum and was so famed that Time magazine devoted two articles to him on his death. E. A. Wallis Budge's work describing the life of Mike has been viewed as the zenith of such biographical writing.

== Early life ==
In the spring of 1908 "Black Jack", the house cat of the Museum, walked up to the Keeper of Egyptian antiquities E. A. Wallis Budge with a large object in his mouth which he then deposited at the Keeper's feet. The object was a kitten, later known as Mike. The following year Mike began to study under Black Jack who taught the younger cat to stalk pigeons by pointing like a dog. Under Black Jack's guidance Mike would proceed to corner the pigeons, daze them, then bring them to the housekeeper, who would exchange the bird for a morsel of food and milk, and release them unharmed.

== Later life ==
Mike spent twenty years at the British Museum during which time he gained a certain notoriety for avoiding women and disliking dogs. Mike would only accept food from those "who treated him as a man and brother". Interest in Mike spread such that Time magazine described him as "probably the most famed British feline of the 20th Century".

Mike retired from official duties in 1924. He continued to take an interest in the comings-and-goings at the Museum, and was especially active when it came to chasing off the occasional wandering dogs, who reportedly "fled in terror" when he attacked.

In 1927, Mike was featured in an article in the Star, which stated that: "He eyes the scholars—famous men from all countries—as philosophically as the later stream of mere curiosity-hunters. High School girls in trim uniform; London street urchins, who make the portico a playground; black-robed monks, gaily sari-ed Hindu ladies, dapper little Japs, and horn-spectacled tourists, are all alike to him."

When Mike died, Wallis Budge contributed to the Evening Standard an obituary which became the basis of his monograph "Mike, the cat who assisted in keeping the main gate of the British Museum from February 1909 to January 1929". This work includes an ode composed by F. C. W. Hiley which ends:

Old Mike! Farewell! We all regret you,
Although, you would not let us pet you;
Of cats the wisest, oldest best cat,
This be your motto — Requiescat!

Mike's tombstone was erected near the Great Russell Street entrance and the inscription reads: "He assisted in keeping the main gate of the British Museum from February 1909 to January 1929."

== See also ==
- List of individual cats
