= Mikey =

Mikey is a masculine given name, often a diminutive form (hypocorism) of Michael or Mitchell. It may also refer to:

== People ==
- Mikey Anderson (born 1999), American ice hockey player
- Mikey Arroyo (born 1969), Filipino actor and politician, son of Philippine President Gloria Macapagal-Arroyo
- Mikey Boyle, Irish hurler
- Mikey Bustos (born 1981), Filipino-Canadian singer, comedian, and actor
- Mikey Chung (1950–2021), Jamaican musician, arranger and record producer
- Mikey Coppola (born 1946), American mobster also known as "Mikey Cigars"
- Mikey Craig (born 1960), English musician, bassist of the 1980s band Culture Club
- Mikey Day (born 1980), American actor, comedian, writer, cast member on Saturday Night Live
- Mikey Mileos (born 1980), Australian stand-up comedian
- Mikey Garcia (born 1987), American boxer, world champion in three weight classes
- Michael Graham (singer) (born 1972), Irish singer, songwriter and record producer
- Mikey Lee (born 1993), Irish hurler
- Mikey Lopez (born 1993), American Major League Soccer player
- Mikey Madison, American actress
- Mikey Maher (1870–1947), Irish hurler
- Mikey McCleary (born 1969), Indian-born New Zealand songwriter, composer, performer, producer and director
- Mikey Nicholls (born 1985), Australian professional wrestler
- Mikey North (born 1986), English actor
- Mikey Robins (born 1961), Australian media personality, game show host, comedian and writer
- Mikey Smith (1954-1983), Jamaican dub poet
- Mikey Way (born 1980), American musician, bassist of My Chemical Romance
- Mikey Walsh (born 1980), British writer, columnist and LGBT activist
- Mikey Welsh (1971-2011), American musician, former bassist of Weezer
- Mikey Wood (born 1996), rugby league player
- Mikey Dangerous, Jamaican/Canadian reggae artist
- Mikey Dread, Jamaican singer, producer, and broadcaster
- Mikey Spice, Jamaican reggae singer
- Mikey or Mike Mondo, ring names of American professional wrestler Michael Brendli (born 1983)
- Mikey Whipwreck, ring name of American retired professional wrestler John Michael Watson (born 1973)
- Mikey Johnston, an Irish professional footballer currently playing for West Bromwich Albion (born 19th April 1999)
- Chancellor, formerly Mikey, American singer-songwriter and record producer born Kim Jung-seung (born 1986)

== Fictional characters ==
- Little Mikey, in a commercial for Life cereal
- Michelangelo (Teenage Mutant Ninja Turtles), nicknamed "Mikey"
- Mikey Berzatto, a character on The Bear
- Mikey, a character in Little Secrets
- Mikey, a character in the Men in Black franchise
- Mikey, main character in Pig City
- Mikey Blumberg, main character of Recess
- Mikey Fuccon, main character of The Fuccons
- Mikey Munroe, main character of Bunsen Is a Beast
- Mikey Palmice, a major first season character in The Sopranos
- Mikey Simon, main character of Kappa Mikey
- Mikey Walsh, main character of The Goonies
- Mikey Waters, one of the two main characters of My Own Private Idaho
- Mikey Ubriacco, main character of Look Who's Talking
- Mikey (Manjirō Sano), in Tokyo Revengers

== See also ==
- Myki, an Australian public transport ticketing system
- Mikeyy, a computer worm
- Mikie, a 1984 arcade game
