= Barton Arcade =

Victorian shopping arcade in Manchester, England

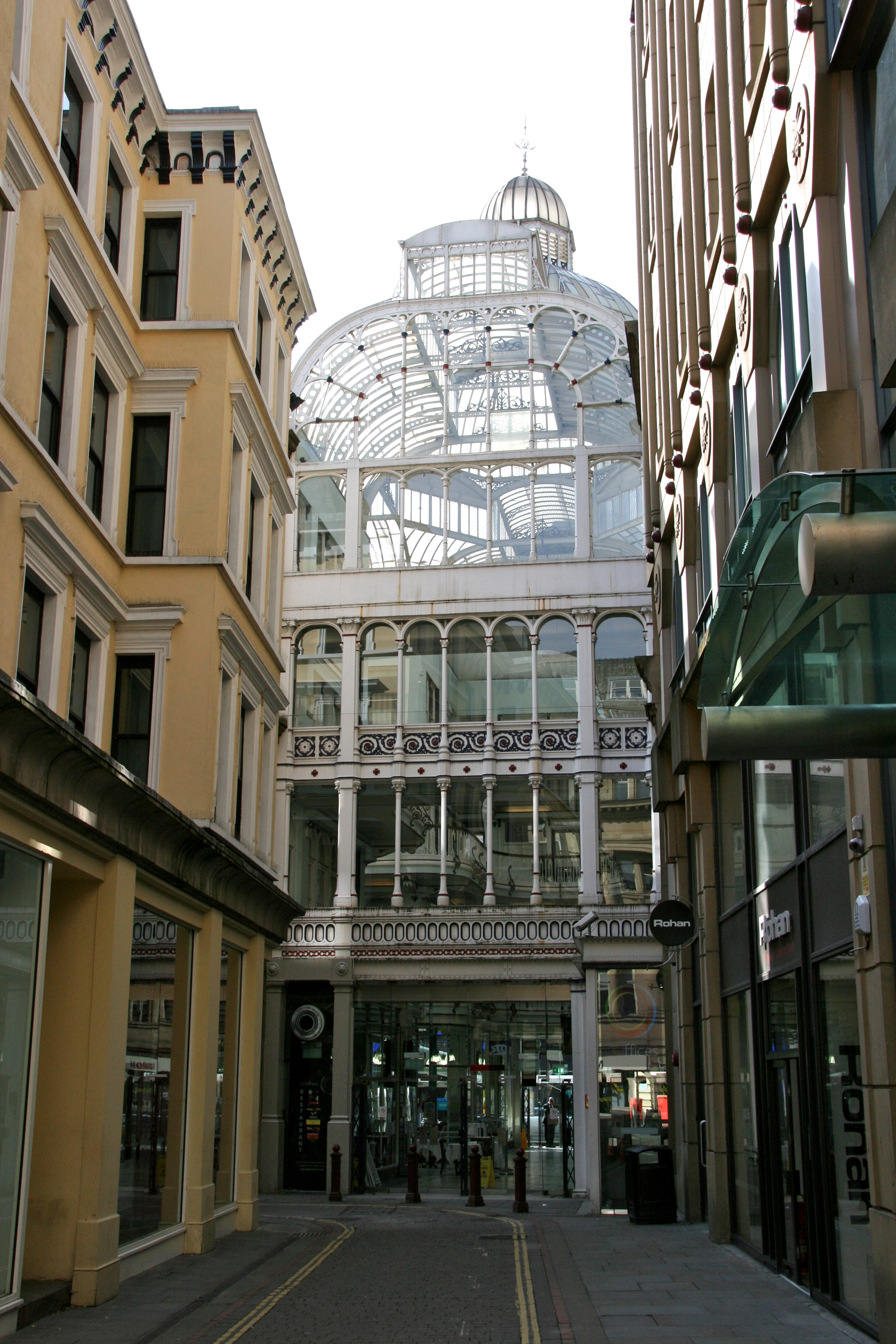
- Barton Arcade, St Ann Square in 2010

- Location within Greater Manchester

General information
- Architectural style: Eclectic
- Location: Barton Square, Manchester, England
- Coordinates: 53.4826°N 2.2464°W
- Completed: 1871
- Renovated: 1980s
- Cost: c. £25,000
- Client: John Hope Barton

Technical details
- Structural system: Cast iron, glass

Design and construction
- Architects: Corbett, Raby & Sawyer

Listed Building – Grade II*
- Official name: Bartons Building including Barton Arcade
- Designated: 25 January 1972
- Reference no.: 1200850

Barton Arcade is a Grade II* listed Victorian arcade situated between Deansgate and St Ann's Square in Manchester, England. Built in 1871 for John Hope Barton and designed by Corbett, Raby and Sawyer, it stood at the forefront of redevelopment following the widening of Deansgate. The building sustained bomb damage in 1940 and was sold privately in 1957 before being restored in the late 20th century. Its listing covers both the arcades and the surrounding block of shops and offices.

== History ==
The building was constructed in 1871, according to its official listing. It was designed by Corbett, Raby, and Sawyer for John Hope Barton, after whom it is named, and cost around £25,000. As part of a wider programme to improve the area and widen the road, Manchester Corporation bought the properties on the east side of Deansgate so the street could be expanded from 25 feet (7.6 m) to 60 feet (18 m), and the building was among the first to be erected on the newly widened thoroughfare.

The building sustained damage and the dome was shattered during the Manchester Blitz in December 1940.

In 1957, the Barton Arcade was sold privately for a sum "in the region of £200,000" for 12 shops and three floors of offices and showrooms. It was bought by an insurance company and Town and City Properties Ltd. The total net floor area was 55,000 sq ft (5,100 m^{2}) and in 1957 the rent roll was about £17,000 a year.

On 25 January 1972, the arcade was designated a Grade II* listed building. The listing encompasses the "block of shops (Barton's Building) and offices enclosing the arcades".

The arcade underwent restoration in the 1980s, and the original shop fronts and decorative floor no longer exist.

== Architecture ==
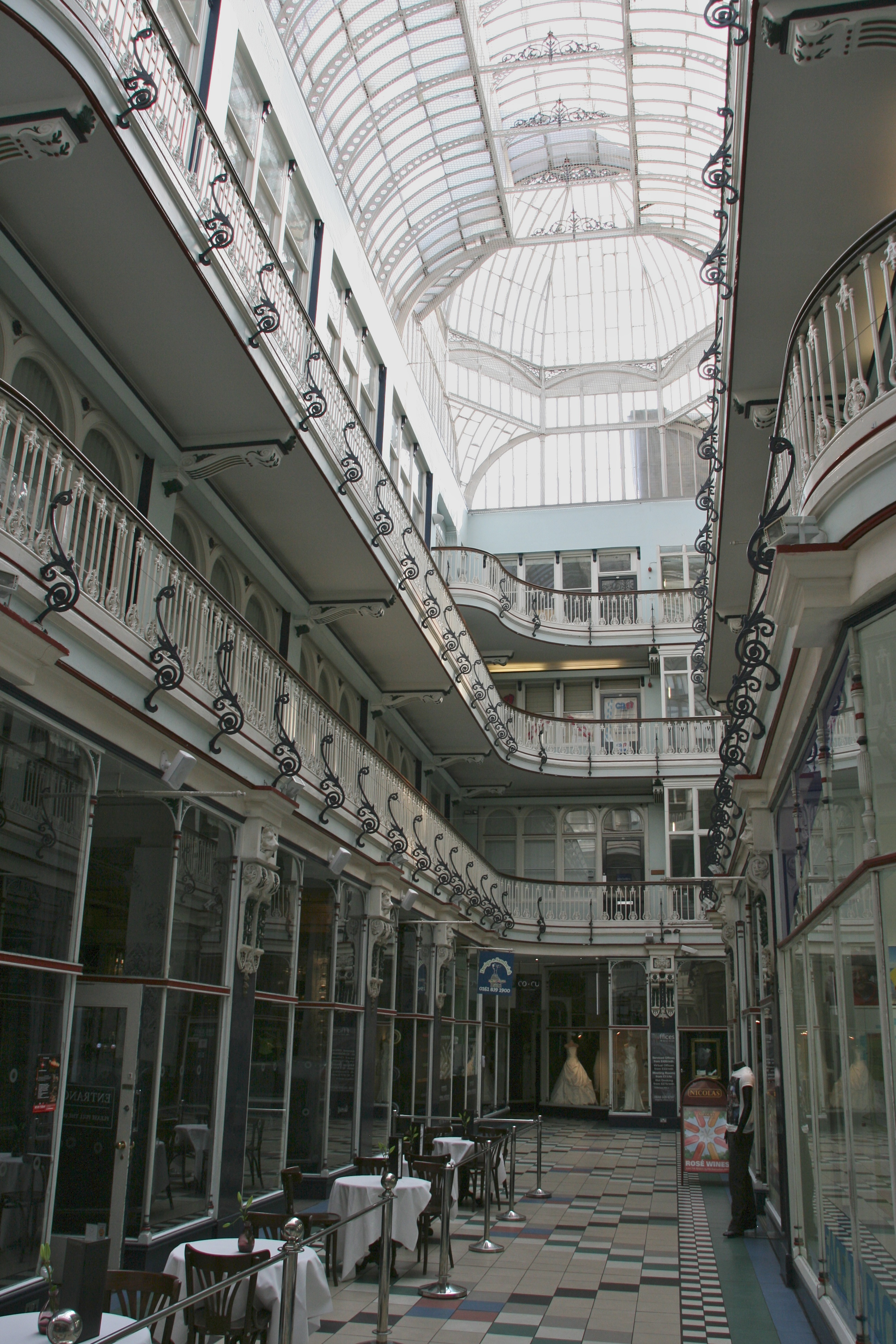
The inside of Barton Arcade

The building is faced in sandstone, with cast‑iron and glass used extensively in its structure, and has slate and glass roofs. The ironwork was supplied by the Saracen Foundry in Glasgow. It is a large, near‑rectangular block arranged around a main arcade running east–west, with a second arcade branching from its south side. It has four storeys with an attic, and has a long nine‑bay frontage to Deansgate marked by a balustraded balcony across the middle of the elevation.

The ground and first floors are designed as a single tier, with narrow piers between the bays. Two of the bays form full‑height entrances with decorative cast‑iron arches, while the others contain later shop fronts at street level and arched three‑light windows above. The upper floors have bracketed cornices and sash windows, with the bays above the entrances distinguished by pilasters, paired arched windows on the top floor, and small square turrets with heavy cornices and pierced parapets. Chimneys rise over the outer sections, and round‑headed dormers sit above the centre.

The rear elevation facing Barton Square is built in cast iron and glass in a style reminiscent of the Crystal Palace, with a tall arched form topped by a dome and cupola. Inside, the building retains an elaborate Victorian shopping arcade, with balconies on two levels that curve at the corners and junctions. These have ornamental cast‑iron balustrades and mahogany handrails, and the whole space is covered by a glazed roof that rises into domes at the north and south ends of the main arcade.

Architectural historian Clare Hartwell describes the Barton's Building façade as "utterly ignorant... the ground floor pilasters must be seen to be believed". The arcade, however, is "a gorgeous glass and iron shopping arcade with glass domes..., the best example of this type of cast-iron and glass arcade anywhere in the country".

== See also ==
- Grade II* listed buildings in Greater Manchester
- Listed buildings in Manchester-M3

== Bibliography ==
- Hartwell, Clare (2001), Manchester, Pevsner Architectural Guides, London: Penguin, ISBN 0-14-071131-7
