= Michael Morrison =

Michael or Mike Morrison may refer to:

- Michael Morrison (author) (born 1970), American author, software developer, and toy inventor
- Mike Morrison (baseball) (1867–1955), 19th-century Major League Baseball pitcher
- Mike Morrison (basketball, born 1967) American basketball player
- Mike Morrison (basketball, born 1989), American basketball player
- Michael Morrison (footballer) (born 1988), English footballer for Reading
- Mike Morrison (ice hockey) (born 1979), American ice hockey player
- Michael Morrison (actor) (1946–2006), American pornographic actor and director
- Michael Morrison (priest) (1908–1973), Irish Jesuit priest and army chaplain
- Mike Morrison, character in the film The Angry Hills
- Michael Morrison (decathlete) (born 1988), winner of the 2011 decathlon at the NCAA DI Championships
- Mike Morrison (long jumper) (born 1984), long and high jumper, bronze medalist at the 2008 USA Indoor Track and Field Championships

== See also ==
- Morrison Stadium, the Michael G. Morrison, S.J., Stadium, soccer stadium in Nebraska
