= Doctor Mike (disambiguation) =

Doctor Mike (Mikhail Oskarovich Varshavski; born 1989) is an American Internet personality and family medicine physician.

Doctor Mike may also refer to:

- Michael Arnheim (born 1944), English nonfiction author
- John M. Ford (1957–2006), American science fiction/fantasy author
- Mike Israetel (born 1984), American exercise scientist and bodybuilder
- Michaela Quinn, the protagonist of the American television series Dr. Quinn, Medicine Woman (1993–1998)
