= Mikee =

Mikee is a unisex given name and a variant name of Mike. Notable people with the name include:

== People ==
- Mikee Cojuangco-Jaworski (born 1974), Filipino equestrienne, local television host and actress
- Mikee Goodman, British singer
- Mikee Lee (born 1990), Filipino actor, model and former reality show contestant
- Mikee Morada (born 1987), Filipino-American politician
- Mikee Quintos (born 1997), Filipina actress and singer
- Mikee Reyes (born 1990), Filipino basketball player
- Mikee Romero (born 1972), Filipino businessman and politician
- Mikee Plastik (born 1976), Slovakian-American recording artist and film & TV composer

== See also ==
- Mike (given name)
