= Row2Recovery =

British unincorporated association of volunteers

Row2Recovery - General Information
- Formation: 2010
- Type: Unincorporated Association
- Purpose: To inspire the disabled and disadvantaged through military adaptive-rowing; and to raise awareness and funds for British wounded, injured and sick veterans and service-personnel and their families
- Motto: Beyond injury, achieving the extraordinary
- Founders: Edward Janvrin and Alexander Mackenzie
- Chair: Paddy Nicoll
- Region Served: United Kingdom
- Official Language: English

Row2Recovery is a British unincorporated association of volunteers which assists military adaptive-rowing. The Association has completed four Atlantic adaptive-rowing crossings and, when a charity, supported a national adaptive-rowing programme for the British military wounded, injured and sick in partnership with British Rowing and Help for Heroes. Row2Recovery was founded in 2010 by former Army-Captains Edward Janvrin and Alexander Mackenzie.

== History ==
=== 2011/12. Team Sealegs rows the Atlantic ===
On 5 December 2011, Row2Recovery's first Atlantic rowing crew departed the Port of San Sebastian on La Gomera, one of Spain's Canary Islands. The crew was made of up of four servicemen who had been wounded in action and two able-bodied servicemen. 50 days, 23 hours and 12 minutes later, Team Sealegs arrived in Port St Charles, Barbados on 25 January 2012. The 2011/12 Crew consisted of:

- Captain Edward De Chevigny Janvrin, 1 Royal Gurkha Rifles. Edward Janvrin was the co-founder of Row2Recovery and the able-bodied Skipper of this first Row2Recovery Atlantic crossing.
- Captain Alexander James Mackenzie MID, 3 Parachute Regiment. Alexander Mackenzie was also co-founder of Row2Recovery and the second of the two able-bodied members of that crew.
- Corporal Neil Heritage, 11 Explosive Ordnance Disposal (EOD) Regiment RLC. In November 2004 Neil Heritage lost both legs above the knee in a suicide bombing at Camp Dogwood south of Baghdad, Iraq.
- Corporal Rory Mackenzie, Royal Army Medical Corps. Rory Mackenzie lost his right leg above the knee when an IED detonated under his Warrior armoured vehicle on a routine patrol in Basra, Iraq, in January 2007.
- Lance Corporal Carl Anstey, 1 The Rifles. Carl Anstey was hit by the blast from a Taliban rocket-propelled grenade in Musa Qala, Afghanistan, in January 2009. The damage from shrapnel shattered his femur and severed his sciatic nerve.
- Lieutenant William Lloyd Lloyd Dixon, 3 The Rifles. William Dixon lost his left leg below the knee when an IED detonated under his vehicle in Helmand, Afghanistan in December 2009.

=== 2013. Row2Recovery merges ===
In April 2013, Row2Recovery formally merged with Rowing For Our Wounded. Rowing For Our Wounded had been founded by Paddy Nicoll in April 2012 to assist "serving and former members of the armed forces who have been wounded or disabled whilst on active service to recover mentally and/ or physically and cope with their disabilities through the provision of specially adaptive equipment, services and funding to enable them to take part in adaptive-rowing or other adaptive sports.". Rowing For Our Wounded had been specifically helping with a national adaptive-rowing programme for the British military wounded, injured and sick in partnership with British Rowing and Help for Heroes, a role Row2Recovery then took on under the new Chairmanship of Paddy Nicoll.

=== 2013/14. Team Endeavour rows the Atlantic ===
On 4 December 2013, Row2Recovery's second Atlantic rowing crew departed the Port of San Sebastian on La Gomera, one of Spain's Canary Islands. The crew was made of up of two servicemen who had been wounded in action and two able-bodied servicemen. 48 days; 9 hours; 13 minutes and 30 seconds later, Team Endeavour arrived in English Harbour, Antigua on 21 January 2014. The 2013/14 Crew consisted of:

- Captain James Murray Kayll, Light Dragoons. James Kayll was the able-bodied Skipper of this second Row2Recovery Atlantic crossing.
- Lance Corporal Cayle Royce MBE, Light Dragoons. Whilst on patrol in Helmand, Afghanistan, in May 2012 with the Brigade Reconnaissance, Cayle Royce lost both legs above the knee, and the fingers on his left hand, when an IED detonated.
- Corporal Scott Blaney, Grenadier Guards. Scott Blaney had his right leg and elbow shattered while he was on patrol in Helmand, Afghanistan in May 2007, when an IED exploded, killing one of his colleagues and injuring four others.
- Captain Mark Edward Jenkins, Royal Army Medical Corps. Mark Jenkins was second of the two able-bodied members of that crew.

=== 2014. Prince Harry launches military adaptive rowing programme ===
On 11 March 2014, Prince Harry formally launched Row2Recovery’s inland programme in the UK at the Henley River and Rowing Museum, helped by a grant from the Endeavour Fund, part of The Royal Foundation of The Duke and Duchess of Cambridge and Prince Harry. In addition to British Rowing and Help for Heroes, the programme is specifically supported by the Sports Recovery programme at Tedworth House; the GB Rowing Team; British Rowing's Rowability Programme; the Defence Medical Rehabilitation Centre Headley Court; Hasler Naval Service Recovery Centre; Guildford Rowing Club; Marlow Rowing Club and Gateshead Community Rowing Club. It was at this event that Prince Harry and Sir Keith Mills were given a demonstration of an indoor adaptive-rowing race which helped convince them that it was an appropriate sport for the Invictus Games.

=== 2015/16. Team Legless rows the Atlantic ===
On 20 December 2015, Row2Recovery's third Atlantic rowing crew departed the Port of San Sebastian on La Gomera, one of Spain's Canary Islands. The crew was made of up of four injured servicemen; two who had been wounded in action and two in accidents in the UK. 46 days; 6 hours; 49 minutes later, Team Endeavour arrived in English Harbour, Antigua on 4 February 2016. The 2015/16 Crew consisted of:

- Lance Corporal Cayle Royce, MBE, Light Dragoons. Having already rowed the Atlantic with Team Endeavour in 2014, Cayle Royce agreed to Skipper of this third Row2Recovery Atlantic crossing, this time with an all-amputee crew.
- Colour Sergeant Lee ("Frank") Spencer, Royal Marines. Lee Spencer lost his right leg below the knee when he was hit by a piece of flying debris whilst helping at the scene of an earlier traffic accident in September 2014.
- Guardsman Patrick Gallagher, Irish Guards. Patrick Gallagher lost his right leg below the knee from an IED in Nad-e Ali, Helmand, Afghanistan in 2009.
- Flight Sergeant Nigel Rogoff, Royal Air Force. Nigel Rogoff lost his left leg above the knee whilst taking part in a Royal Air Force parachuting display in December 1998.

=== 2017/18. Team Trident breaks able-bodied World Record ===
Row2Recovery's fourth Atlantic rowing crew, having departed the Port of San Sebastián on La Gomera, one of Spain's Canary Islands on 14 December 2017, arrived in English Harbour, Antigua, on the 20 January 2018 after 37 days, 8 hours and 8 minutes. They beat the previous fastest time for a Pair to row the Atlantic by 3 days.

The crew was made of up of one injured and one able-bodied serviceman. The 2017/18 Crew consists of:

- Lance Corporal Jordan Beecher, Parachute Regiment. Jordan Beecher lost his left leg below the knee from an IED in Afghanistan in October 2012.
- Captain Jonathan Kevin Armstrong, Parachute Regiment and Royal Gurkha Rifles.

== Fundraising ==
To date, through these extreme adaptive rowing endeavours, Row2Recovery crews have raised over a million pounds for the large military charities including BLESMA; Prince Harry's Endeavour Fund; Help for Heroes; The Soldiers' Charity and SSAFA.

== Patrons ==
- General David Julian Richards, Baron Richards of Herstmonceux, GCB, CBE, DSO, DL. General David Richards is a retired senior British Army officer who was formerly the Chief of the Defence Staff, the professional head of the British Armed Forces.
- Carys Davina "Tanni" Grey-Thompson, Baroness Grey-Thompson, DBE, DL. Baroness "Tanni" Grey-Thompson was born with spina bifida, is a British former wheelchair racer, a parliamentarian and a television presenter. She is considered as one of the UK's most successful para-athletes, having gained sixteen paralympic medals.

== Notable pro-Bono supporters ==
- His Royal Highness Prince Henry Charles Albert David of Wales, KCVO.
- Sir Steven Geoffrey Redgrave, CBE, DL.
- Sir Matthew Clive Pinsent, CBE.
- James Edward Cracknell, OBE.
- Alex Gregory MBE.
