= Wood Street Mission =

Children's charity in Manchester, England

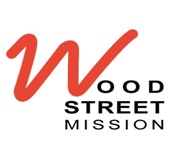
- Formation: 1869
- Founder: Alfred Alsop
- Location: Manchester, United Kingdom
- Website: www.woodstreetmission.org.uk

Wood Street Mission is a registered children's charity located in the centre of Manchester. Its office is in Wood Street, off Deansgate, near the John Rylands Library. It was founded by Alfred Alsop, a Methodist minister in 1869, and its aim is to alleviate the effects of poverty on children and families in Manchester and Salford. The charity provides free, practical help to several thousand families in need every year. Wood Street provides those in need with free basic but essential goods, such as clothing, bedding, baby equipment and school uniforms and treats of chocolate eggs at Easter and toys and gifts at Christmas. By providing the essentials, completely free of charge, Wood Street aims to ensure that no child goes without whilst giving disadvantaged families the chance to break the cycle of poverty.

== History ==
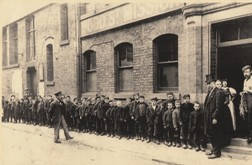
Boys queuing for the Wood Street soup kitchen, ca. 1900

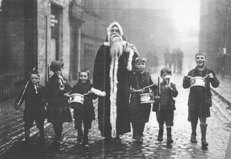
Father Christmas visits Wood Street ca. 1930

=== Early years ===
Established in 1869 by Alfred Alsop, Wood Street Mission was born in a climate of widespread poverty and destitution. During the late 19th century, the mission worked in the slums of Deansgate, running a soup kitchen, a rescue society and home for neglected boys, and a night shelter for the homeless. Wood Street handed over thousands of clogs and items of clothing each year, as well as hundreds of toys at Christmas. A further development was the establishment of a Working Men's Church in Bridge Street. Through this period, Wood Street was managed by prominent professionals, such as solicitor C. J. Needham, and was financially supported by businessmen such as clothing manufacturer, Edward Tootal Broadhurst and the engineer Charles J. Galloway.

In the 1880s, Wood Street Mission started taking local children to Southport for a day at the seaside. This activity proved so popular that a seaside camp was built which provided accommodation for around 120 children. The seaside camp was operational for about 30 years and closed in 1919.

Between 1896 and 1907, Wood Street Mission rebuilt and enlarged its premises responding to increasing need in Manchester and Salford. Throughout this period, the distribution of toys and dolls to children on Boxing Day received much attention and was supported and attended by the Lord Mayor. During the early 20th century, Wood Street continued with many welfare activities, including the soup kitchen and night shelter. In 1910, Wood Street received praise from the Lord Mayor in providing help to a group of unemployed people whom the Manchester City Distress Committee could not afford to relieve.

=== 1920s and after ===
At the end of the First World War, Wood Street decided to replace the seaside camp with a holiday home in Blackpool. The holiday home, based at Squires Gate opened in 1922. With over 7 acres (2.8 ha) of playing fields and a swimming pool, the home allowed Wood Street to provide free week-long holidays to over 1,000 children each summer. Many annual reports highlight that children were entertained on these holidays at the Blackpool Pleasure Beach, the Tower Circus, the Ice Palace and the South Pier.

During the interwar years, Wood Street Mission held a range of social activities in addition to provision of welfare. For example, Wood Street held cinema shows and sewing classes during the 1930s. While the Second World War disrupted some of the mission's activities (the holiday home requisitioned by the Government and rooms in the Manchester building were used as an air raid shelter), Wood Street was able to run a centre for evacuated children.

After the Second World War, the mission continued its welfare work in Manchester and Salford. Even after the establishment of the post-war welfare state, Wood Street annually distributed over 1,000 articles of clothing and around 4,000 toys in the late-1940s and 1950s. The creation of the post-war welfare state also led to a close partnership between Wood Street and statutory welfare bodies such as local education authorities and social services. This partnership continues today. During the mid-1940s, Wood Street Mission remained a focal point for the community and started a youth club, which fielded both cricket and football teams. By the early 1960s, the club had over 600 members and an attendance on Friday nights of over 200.

In 1963, it closed the holiday home in Blackpool and bought Birchfield Lodge, an outdoor recreational centre in the Derbyshire countryside. Birchfield Lodge had 9 acres (3.6 ha) of ground and offered a variety of activities to children not available in inner-city Manchester including rock-climbing and canoeing, fell-walking, caving and fishing. In addition, in 1964, Wood Street also provided an advisory service for children and teenagers with problems staffed by experienced counsellors.

=== Later 20th century and 21st century ===
During the late 1970s and 1980s, Wood Street Mission responded to an increase in unemployment in Manchester and Salford by distributing a larger quantity of clothing, bedding and basic items. Between 1979 and 1989, the number of families receiving this help rose from around 675 to 1,000. Although Birchfield Lodge was sold in 1981 as a result of high operational costs, Wood Street provided day-trips for children to Blackpool in co-operation with local companies.

Since the 1980s, Wood Street Mission has primarily focused on the distribution of clothing, bedding, baby equipment and toys. Wood Street's goal is to see that all children, young people and families in the Manchester and Salford areas are free from poverty and able to provide essential items for themselves and their families.

== Projects ==
Wood Street Mission runs four projects each year to help children and families affected by poverty in Manchester and Salford. Their largest project is 'Family Basics', which runs from January to November. Through this project Wood Street provides clothing, bedding, baby equipment and toys to low-income families. In spring, Wood Street runs an Easter Project, and provides chocolate eggs and treats to children affected by poverty. In the summertime, Wood Street provides free school uniforms to families in need in time for the new school year in September, through their 'SmartStart' Uniform Project. Each year as part of the Christmas Appeal, Wood Street distributes toys and gifts to families in need, providing a selection of toys for every child. The vast majority of goods it provides are donated by local people and businesses, though they raise funds to buy in stock when demand exceeds supply.
