= I Like Mike =

I Like Mike may refer to:

- I Like Mike (musical), 1956 Israeli musical
- I Like Mike (film), 1961 Israeli drama film based on the musical
- A slogan used for the Michael Bloomberg 2020 presidential campaign
- A slogan used for the Mike Huckabee 2008 presidential campaign
