= Robert Kirkland =

Robert Kirkland may refer to:

- Robert Lamont Kirkland, British general
- Robert Kirkland, founder of the Discovery Park of America
- Robert Kirkland (curler) (Bobby Kirkland), Scottish curler
