= Mike Minor =

Mike Minor may refer to:

- Mike Minor (actor) (1940–2016), American actor
- Mike Minor (baseball) (born 1987), American baseball pitcher
- Mike Minor (snowboarder) (born 1990), Paralympic gold medalist

== See also ==
- Michael Minor (1941–1987), illustrator and Star Trek director
