= Mike Zuurman =

Michael Wilhelmer Zuurman (born September 8, 1974, in Veendam) is a Dutch biologist by education and programmer for the non-profit organization Xentax Foundation in Emmen. His professional career is in programming, science and pharmaceuticals. His 'handle' is Mr. Mouse.

== Education ==
- Biology at the University of Groningen from 1993 to 1999
- PhD student at the Department of Medical Physiology of the same university from 1999 to 2003
- PhD title in 2003 after finishing the thesis entitled "Orphan chemokine receptors in neuroimmunology: functional and pharmacological analysis of L-CCR and HCR"

== Profession ==
- Medical Adviser for Novartis from 2007 onwards
- Post-doctoral fellow at the University Medical Center Groningen from 2003 to 2007
- Founder of Xentax Foundation in 2006, originally starting as a Commodore 64 demo and music group in 1989, and currently chairman since then.
- Freelance game journalist and moderator for PCZone Benelux from 2001 to 2002, a hard-copy game magazine that was disbanded in 2005

== Publications ==
- Scientific publications in peer reviewed journals
- MultiEx Commander, a game file handler
- MexScript, a multi-paradigm computer scripting language
- Metacritic: Quantify Me. A 30-page quantitative analysis of the games data at Metacritic.
- MobyGames: Quantify Me. A brief quantitative analysis of the gaming era according to MobyGames.
- Commodore 64 Scene statistical history 'CSDb - Quantify Me'
- 'The definitive guide to exploring file formats'
- Commodore 64 music
- Commodore 64 programs
