= Mike Oliver (disability advocate) =

British academic and activist

- Born: Michael James Hoiles Oliver; 3 February 1945; Rochester, Kent, England
- Died: 2 March 2019 (aged 74)
- Education: University of Kent
- Occupations: Sociologist, author, and disability rights activist
- Known for: Social model of disability
- Spouses: Judith Hunt (m. 1972) Joy Lenny (m. 1994)
- Children: 2

Michael James Hoiles Oliver (3 February 1945 – 2 March 2019) was an English sociologist, author, and disability rights activist. He was the first Professor of Disability Studies in the world, and key advocate of the social model of disability.

== Early life ==
Michael James Hoiles Oliver was born 3 February 1945, in Rochester, Kent to Fred and Edna (nee Hoiles) Oliver. He grew up in Borstal and attended Sir Joseph Williamson's Mathematical School, leaving at 16 to work as a payroll clerk. He broke his neck in 1962 while on holiday, and was treated at Stoke Mandeville Hospital. He used a wheelchair after his accident.

He returned home after a year of rehabilitation. He worked in adult education at Borstal Prison (now HM Prison Rochester) and then took a degree in sociology. He started his degree at the University of Reading in 1971, but the support arrangements were inadequate, and he left after a few weeks. He completed his bachelor's degree at the University of Kent, followed by a master's, and a doctorate completed in 1978.

== Academic career ==
From 1979, Oliver ran a course on Social Work with Disabled People at the University of Kent.

In 1983, he published his first book, Social Work with Disabled People. This text went on to have four editions, published in 1999, 2006, and 2012, respectively, with later editions co-authored by Bob Sapey and Pam Thomas. Oliver later published The Politics of Disablement (1990), with a second edition co-authored with Colin Barnes published in 2012, Social Work: Disabled People and Disabling Environments (1991), and Understanding Disability (1996).

Oliver became a key advocate of the social model of disability. This is the idea that much of the inconvenience and difficulty of living with a disability is not an inherent feature of the disability itself, but a failure of society to adapt to the needs of disabled people. While the distinction between "impairment" and "disability" had been made by the Union of the Physically Impaired Against Segregation, Oliver coined the term "social model" to describe this distinction, and popularized it. He also coined the term "Emancipatory disability studies", by which he meant that researchers must not be "parasites" but instead serve the interests of disabled people.

At the time he retired, Oliver was Emeritus Professor of Disability Studies at the University of Greenwich.

== Personal life ==
Oliver married Judith Hunt in 1972 and adopted her children, Eleanor and William. After the couple divorced, Oliver married Joy Lenny in 1994.

Oliver died 2 March 2019.

== Books ==
- Oliver, Michael (1983). Social Work with Disabled People. Practical social work. London: Macmillan. ISBN 978-0-333-32707-4.
  - Oliver, Michael; Sapey, Bob (1999). Social Work with Disabled People (2nd ed.). Macmillan. ISBN 978-0-333-73261-8.
  - Oliver, Michael; Sapey, Bob (2006). Social Work with Disabled People (3rd ed.). Palgrave Macmillan. ISBN 978-1-4039-1838-3.
  - Oliver, Michael; Sapey, Bob; Thomas, Pam (2012). Social Work with Disabled People. Practical Social Work Ser. Bob Sapey, Pam Thomas (4th ed.). London: Macmillan Education UK. ISBN 978-0-23-029795-1.
- Oliver, Michael (1990). The Politics of Disablement: A Sociological Approach. Macmillan Education. ISBN 9780333432938.
- Oliver, Michael (1991). Social Work: Disabled People and Disabling Environments. J. Kingsley Publishers. ISBN 9781853020421.
- Oliver, Michael (1996). Understanding Disability: From Theory to Practice. Macmillan. ISBN 9780333599167.
- Oliver, Michael; Barnes, Colin (2012). The New Politics of Disablement. Palgrave Macmillan. ISBN 978-0-33-394567-4.
