= Deansgate =

Road in Manchester, England

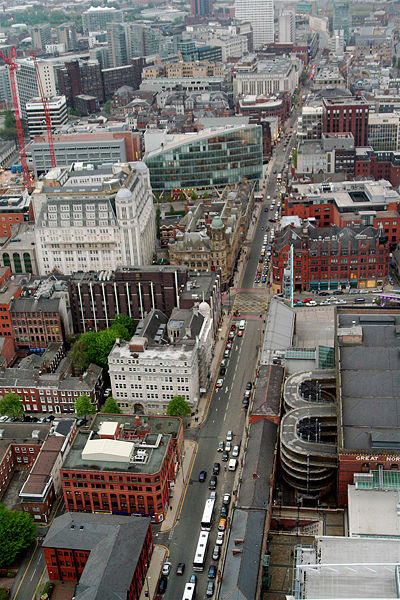
- Aerial view of Deansgate from the Beetham Tower
- Interactive map of Deansgate
- Length: 1.0 mi (1.6 km)
- Location: Manchester, England
- North end: Victoria Street
- South end: Castlefield

Other
- Known for: Shopping, Kendals, the Great Northern Warehouse, the John Rylands Library, Beetham Tower, Manchester Cathedral

Deansgate is a main road (part of the A56) running through Manchester city centre, England. It runs roughly north–south through the western side of the city centre and, at over one mile in length, is the longest street in the central area.

== History ==
Deansgate is one of the city's oldest thoroughfares. In Roman times its route passed close to the fort of Mamucium and led from the River Medlock, where there was a ford and the road to Deva (Chester). Several civilian buildings and a mansio were located along it in the area now occupied by the Beetham Tower. Part of the route was known as Aldport Lane from Saxon times, Aldport being the Saxon name for Castlefield. Until the 1730s the surrounding area remained rural, but it became built up following the development of a quay on the river.

The road is named after the lost River Dene, which may have flowed along the Hanging Ditch, connecting the River Irk to the River Irwell at the street's northern end. The element 'gate' derives from the Norse gata, meaning 'way'.

By the late 19th century, Deansgate contained a mixture of uses: its northern end had shops and substantial office buildings, while further south were slums and a working-class district around St John's Church, with St John Street remaining an upper-middle-class enclave. The Wood Street Mission was founded in 1869 to address social conditions in the area, and its work continues today in a different form. From Peter Street southwards, the eastern side of Deansgate was dominated by the viaducts of the Great Northern and Manchester South Junction railways, and the Rochdale Canal passed beneath the road to link with other waterways beyond. In the late 20th century, Deansgate housed the head office of the Manchester Evening News, later replaced by part of the Spinningfields development. In early 2023, cycle lanes and cycle laybys were installed along the road.

== Geography ==
Deansgate begins at Victoria Street, a 19th-century creation. Its east side was occupied by the Victoria Buildings built on a triangular site by Manchester Corporation in 1876, but destroyed during a bomb raid in the Manchester Blitz in December 1940. A statue of Oliver Cromwell at the northern corner commemorated Manchester's support for Parliament in the English Civil War. The statue was a gift to the city by Mrs Abel Heywood in memory of her first husband, Thomas Goadsby and was the first large statue of Cromwell to be raised in the open anywhere in England.

At the northern end of Deansgate is Victoria Street, on which lies Manchester Cathedral, and at the southern end is Deansgate railway station. At this point Deansgate connects with Bridgewater Viaduct and Chester Road (Whitworth Street West meets it at this point). The section to the south of Peter Street was known as Aldport Street until the end of the 18th century.

Elliott House; architects Royle & Bennett

The street contains many shops including a House of Fraser department store (known as Kendals from the 1830s until 2005), and Waterstones along with many public houses and bars including The Moon Under Water, formerly the Deansgate Cinema (or ABC Deansgate). At 820 square metres (8,800 sq ft), able to accommodate 1,700 customers, and employing 60 staff, it has been listed in The Guinness Book of Records as the largest public house in Britain. Elliott House was the Manchester Registry Office and before that the offices of the corporation's Education Department.

The northern end of the street adjoined the Shambles and was badly damaged in the 1996 Manchester bombing. The area was redeveloped and houses several new buildings, including No. 1 Deansgate and the Manchester branch of Harvey Nichols. Other buildings in the Deansgate area include the Royal Bank of Scotland, the Beetham Tower and the redeveloped Great Northern Warehouse. Historic buildings include the John Rylands Library and the Barton Arcade shopping mall. The disused Manchester and Salford Junction canal runs underneath Deansgate below the Great Northern Warehouse.

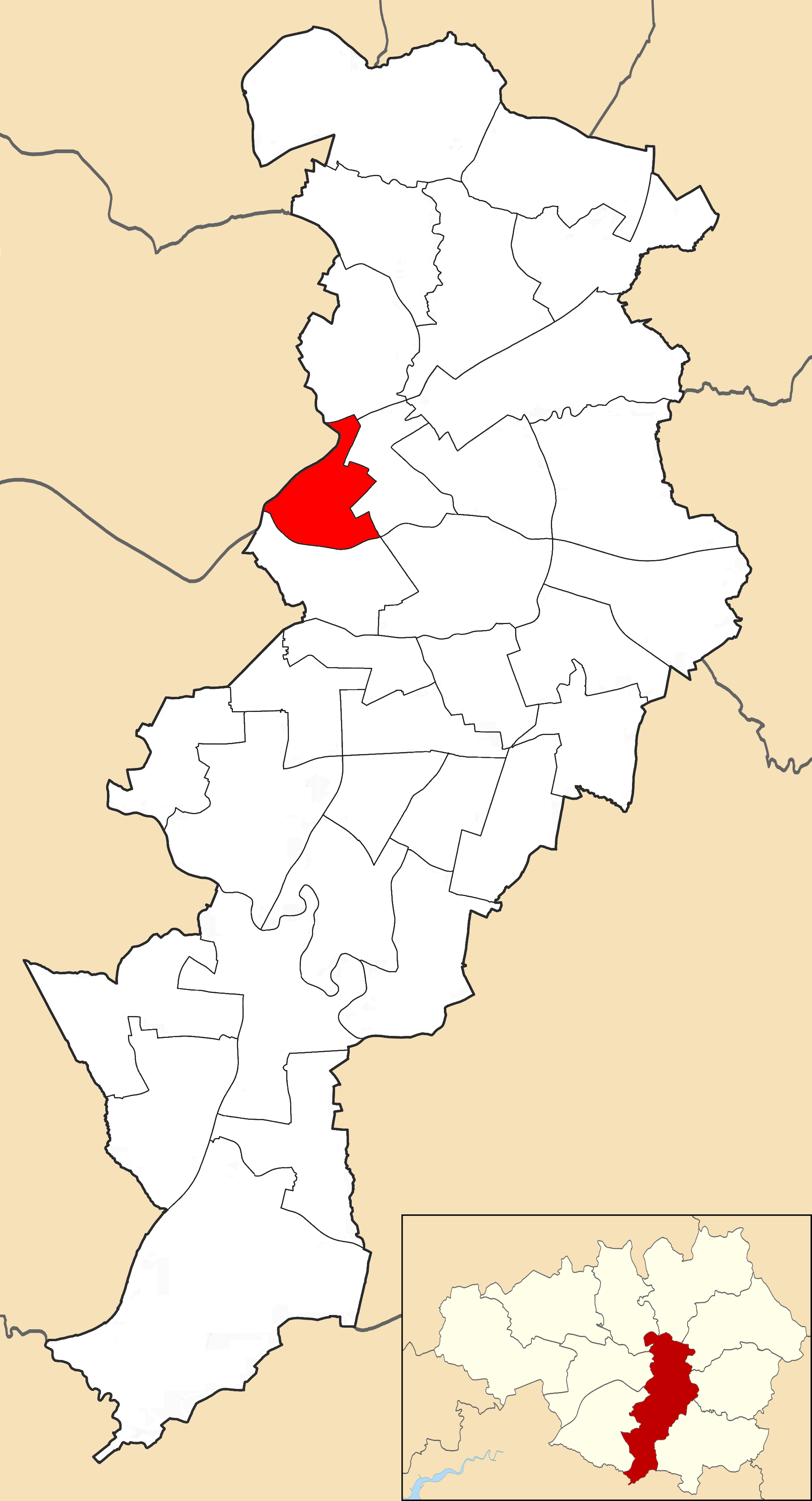
Deansgate electoral ward within Manchester City Council

== Transport ==
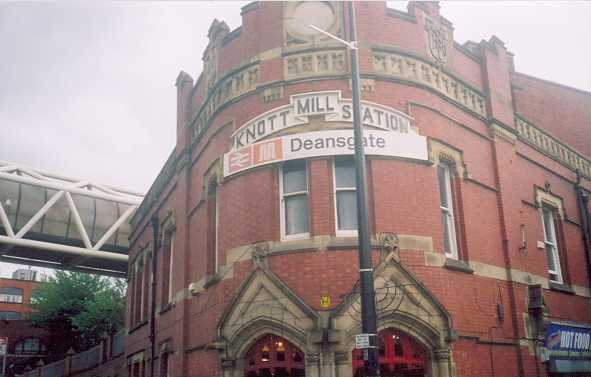
Deansgate railway station: station frontage which features the previous "Knott Mill" name

Today, the main transport links on Deansgate are the National Rail and Manchester Metrolink stations and a number of bus routes, including the Metroshuttle services.

Deansgate Station was opened at Knott Mill on 20 July 1849 by the Manchester South Junction and Altrincham Railway. It is linked to Deansgate-Castlefield Metrolink station on the Metrolink system.

In the first half of the 20th century, Deansgate was a route for trams operated by Manchester Corporation Tramways, and subsequently carried numerous bus services. During the 1970s, many bus routes were diverted or separated into two services terminating in the city centre and adjoining streets such as King Street were pedestrianised.

In 2009 there were calls for traffic to be banned on Deansgate and for it to be pedestrianised. The calls were triggered in response to road works that closed parts of Deansgate. Some argued that the disablement of a major traffic route in the city centre could have a damaging economic effect, while others argued that a vehicle-free Deansgate would attract more shoppers. Victoria Street, the short section at the North end of the road by Manchester Cathedral has been pedestrianised.

In 2019 Extinction Rebellion occupied a section of the road from St Mary's Gate to John Dalton Street for four days, with tents and organised talks on climate change, sustainable living and resistance. This reignited calls for it to be pedestrianised.

In 2022 widened cycle lanes were put in place, and a bus lane opened at the junction of Blackfriars Street and Deansgate for southbound buses, taxis and bicycles. From Bridge Street to Quay Street it will be permanently one-way only, in a southbound direction.

The 'free bus' services 1, 2 and 3 operate around the city centre and all three routes have stops on Deansgate.

== Events ==
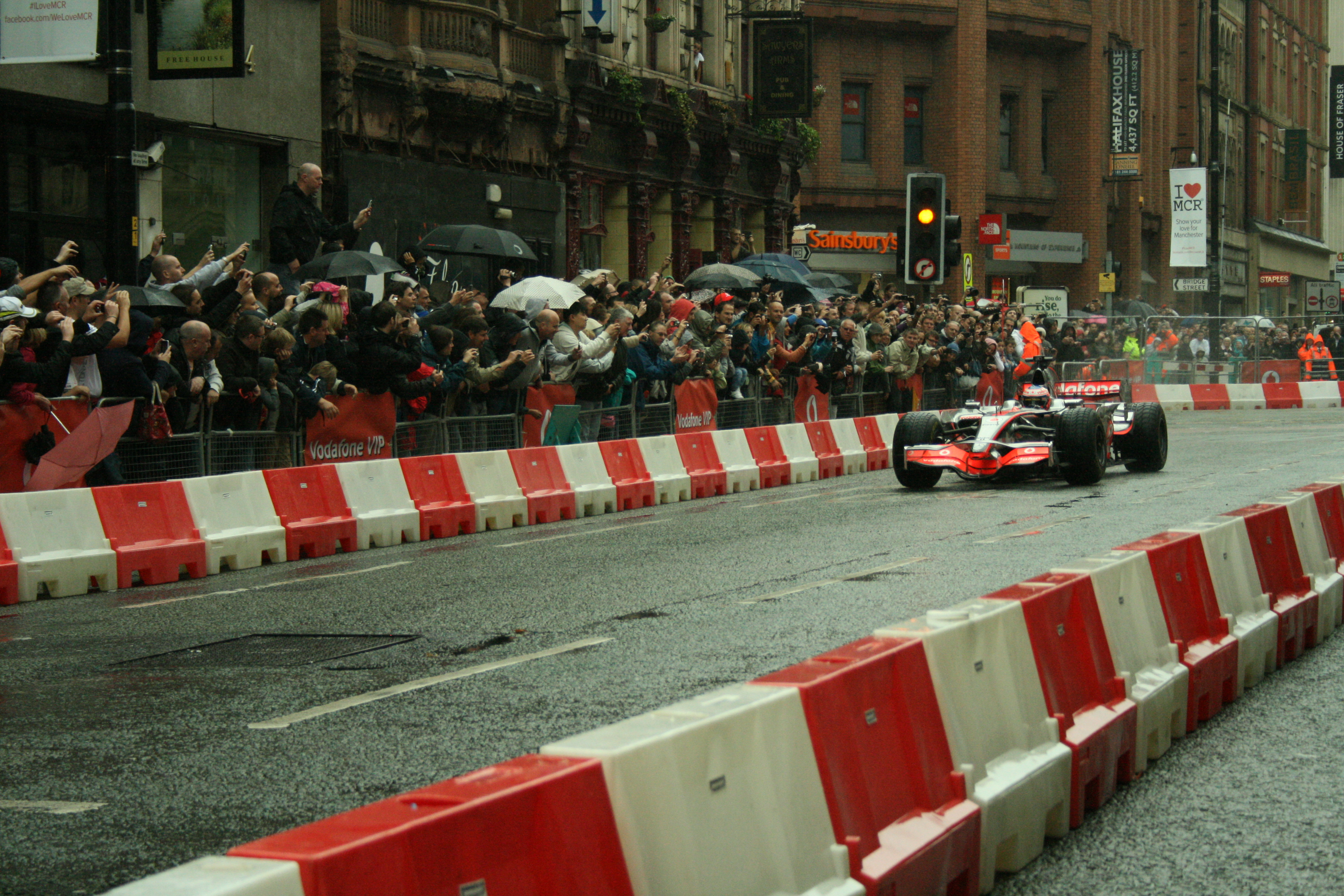
Jenson Button drives a McLaren F1 car down Deansgate.

Deansgate is a long straight street which has provided a venue for sporting events in the city centre. In 2001 the inaugural Great City Games took place on Deansgate, which featured a 150-metre (490 ft) sprinting track. The event has become an annual fixture on the Great Manchester Run weekend during mid-May. Usain Bolt set a world record for the 150 m straight in 2009 and Tyson Gay ran the 200 m straight in record time in 2010.

In 2006 A1 Racing cars visited the city to launch A1 Grand Prix, and used Deansgate as part of the route. In August 2011, thousands packed the street as Jenson Button drove a McLaren MP4-23 along Deansgate as part of the Vodafone VIP Live Manchester festival.
