= Jim Kirkland =

English footballer

Personal information
- Full name: James William Kirkland
- Date of birth: 30 October 1946
- Place of birth: Bedford, England
- Height: 1.77 m (5 ft 10 in)
- Position: Left-back

Senior career*
Years	Team	Apps	(Gls)
1968–1969	Birkenshaw Amateurs		
1969–1970	Aberdeen	13	(0)
1970–1971	Grimsby Town	12	(0)
- * Club domestic league appearances and goals

James William Kirkland (born 30 October 1946) was a Scottish professional footballer who played as a left-back.
