= Mike Kirkland =

Mike Kirkland may refer to:

== Sportspeople ==
- Mike Kirkland (American football) (born 1954), former American football quarterback
- Mike Kirkland (politician), member of the Alabama House of Representatives
- Mike Kirkland (coach), athletic director at Southwestern College in Winfield, Kansas
- Mike Kirkland (rally driver) (born 1947), Kenyan rally driver

== Musicians ==
- Mike Kirkland, member of the folk singing group The Brothers Four, 1957–1969
- Mike James Kirkland (born 1949), American R&B singer
