= Aberdeen F.C. in European football =

Scottish club in European football

Aberdeen FC in European football
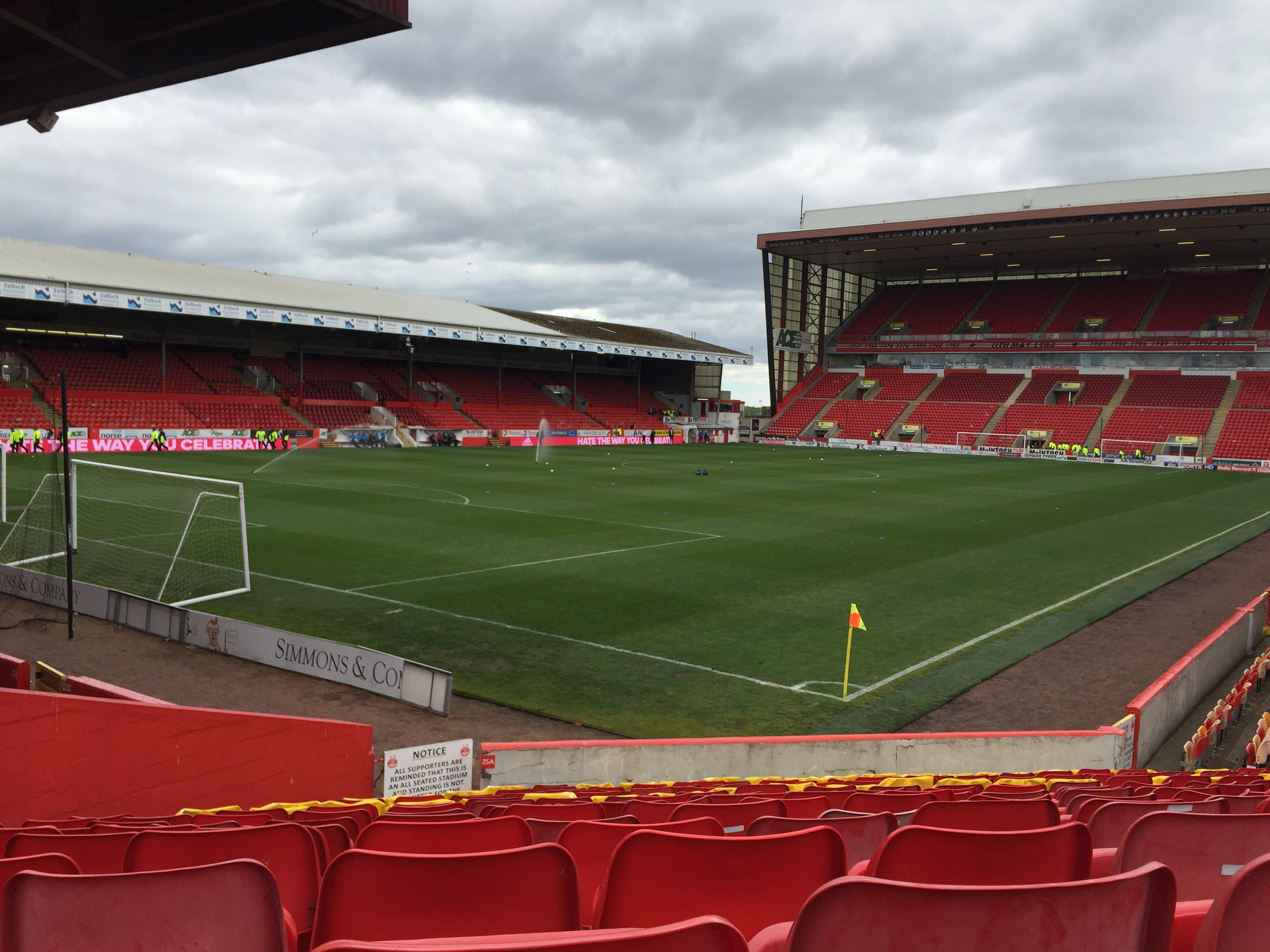
- Aberdeen's Pittodrie Stadium
- Club: Aberdeen
- Seasons played: 38
- First entry: 1967–68 European Cup Winners' Cup
- Latest entry: 2025–26 UEFA Conference League

Titles
- Champions League: 0
- Europa League: 0 (Best: playoff round)
- Cup Winners' Cup: 1 (1983)
- Super Cup: 1 (1983)

Aberdeen F.C. is a Scottish professional football club based in Aberdeen, Scotland. Aberdeen's first participation in European competition was in the 1967–68 season, when they competed in the European Cup Winners' Cup.

The club has competed in Europe in 36 seasons since 1967, winning the European Cup Winners' Cup in 1983 and the European Super Cup in the same year, a Scottish record for European trophy wins.

Willie Miller holds the record for European appearances for Aberdeen, making 61 appearances between 1973 and 1989. The club's top scorer in Europe is Mark McGhee, with 14 goals. Aberdeen's record win in Europe is 10–0, which came in their first-ever European match against KR Reykjavík of Iceland in 1967.

== Honours ==
European honours of Aberdeen F.C.
Honour	No.	Years
European Cup Winners' Cup	1	1982–83
UEFA Super Cup	1	1983

== History ==
=== 1967–1974 ===
Aberdeen played their first official match in competitive European football in September 1967 in a European Cup Winners' Cup first-round game against KR Reykjavík of Iceland. They qualified for the competition after reaching the Scottish Cup Final in 1967. Celtic had won the League and European Cup, and so they qualified for the European Cup. The match ended in a 10–0 victory for Aberdeen. The return leg saw Aberdeen win 4–1, making the score 14–1 on aggregate. In the second round, Aberdeen were knocked out by Belgian club Standard Liège, losing 0–3 in Liège and winning the second leg 2–0 at Pittodrie.

In 1968, in the Fairs Cup, Aberdeen defeated Bulgarian club Slavia Sofia in the first round. In the second round, a capacity crowd saw Aberdeen beat Spanish club Real Zaragoza 2–1, however Aberdeen were defeated 0–3 in Spain, and were knocked out 2–4 on aggregate.

Aberdeen had the distinction of being the very first team to be knocked out of a European competition in a penalty shoot-out, during the first round of the 1970–71 European Cup Winners' Cup. After a 4–4 two-legged aggregate draw against Hungarian team Honvéd, the match had to be decided by a penalty shoot-out. Aberdeen lost by five kicks to four in Budapest, Jim Forrest missed a penalty.

In 1971, Aberdeen were drawn against Spanish club Celta de Vigo in the first round of the UEFA Cup. A 3–0 aggregate victory meant Aberdeen were through to the second round, where they were drawn against Italian club Juventus. Aberdeen lost the first leg in Turin 0–2 with Fabio Capello amongst the scorers. They drew the second leg 1–1, Joe Harper scored Aberdeen's goal.

The 1972–73 UEFA Cup saw Aberdeen drawn with Borussia Mönchengladbach of West Germany. Aberdeen went down 2–3 at Pittodrie, and lost the second leg 3–6, going out of the competition with a 5–9 aggregate score.

The following year, after knocking out Finn Harps of Ireland, Aberdeen were drawn against English opposition for the first time in European competition. Aberdeen drew 1–1 at home to Tottenham Hotspur, but were beaten 1–4 at White Hart Lane in the second leg.

Aberdeen failed to qualify for European football between 1974 and 1977.

=== 1977–1986 ===
Aberdeen's first European tie for four years came against Belgian club RWD Molenbeek of Brussels in 1977. A 0–0 draw away in the Belgian capital set the Dons up for the return leg at Pittodrie, however Drew Jarvie's goal could not prevent Aberdeen losing 2–1, knocking them out of Europe. This was manager Billy McNeill's only European tie as Aberdeen manager.

Despite losing the 1978 Scottish Cup final to Rangers, Aberdeen qualified for the 1978–79 European Cup Winners' Cup because Rangers had won the Premier Division, and they qualified for the European Cup. Under new manager Alex Ferguson, Aberdeen knocked out Marek Dimitrov of Bulgaria in the first round. Ferguson's team lost to Fortuna Düsseldorf in the second round, losing the first leg 0–3 in West Germany but winning 2–0 in Aberdeen.

In the 1979–80 season, Aberdeen once again failed to progress past the first round of the UEFA Cup, losing 1–2 on aggregate to West German club Eintracht Frankfurt.

After winning the Premier Division in 1980, Aberdeen made their debut in the European Cup (They withdrew in 1955) in the 1980–81 season. Aberdeen were drawn against Austria Memphis in the opening round of the European Cup. The first leg at Pittodrie was won by Aberdeen, Mark McGhee scored the only goal of the game in a 1–0 win. The second leg in Vienna ended in a 0–0 draw. Aberdeen advanced to the second round, where the draw had paired them with English champions Liverpool. After winning 1–0 in Aberdeen, Liverpool won the second leg 4–0 at Anfield to complete a 5–0 victory.

The following season, in the 1981–82 UEFA Cup, Aberdeen knocked out defending champions, English club Ipswich Town, in the opening round, then beat Romanians Argeș Pitești in the second round, before going on to lose in the third round to future European champions Hamburger SV. This was the first time that Aberdeen had reached the third round of a European competition.

In 1982–83, Aberdeen had qualified for the European Cup Winners' Cup by winning the Scottish Cup in 1982. Aberdeen were entered in the preliminary round against Sion of Switzerland. The first leg at Pittodrie ended in a 7–0 victory for Aberdeen over the Swiss side. This was Aberdeen's second biggest margin of victory in European competition, and in the second leg Aberdeen won 4–1 in Switzerland to complete an 11–1 aggregate win. This set up a tie in the first round against Dinamo Tirana from Albania. The first leg was close, with John Hewitt scoring the only goal of the game, and what turned out to be the only goal of the tie, as Aberdeen's first trip to Albania ended in a 0–0 draw. That was enough to see Aberdeen through to the next round, with a 1–0 aggregate victory. In the second round, Polish club Lech Poznań were drawn to play Aberdeen. In the first leg in Scotland, Aberdeen won 2–0. In the return leg in Poland, Aberdeen ground out a 1–0 victory. The aggregate score-line was 3–0 and this had earned Aberdeen a passage to the quarter-finals of Europe for the very first time in the club's history.

The draw for the quarter-finals paired Aberdeen with West Germany's Bayern Munich. In the first leg, the game finished 0–0, with Aberdeen putting in a good defensive display. In the second leg at Pittodrie, Bayern twice took the lead, but Aberdeen won the game 3–2, in a game described as "Pittodrie's greatest night".

In the semi-final, Aberdeen had been drawn against Belgian club Waterschei. Aberdeen won 5–1 at home in the first leg. In the second leg in Belgium, Aberdeen lost for the first time in the competition that season, the Belgians won 1–0.

The final saw Aberdeen face the Spanish club Real Madrid. Before the final the club released a song recorded by the players, "European Song", to coincide with the appearance in the final. The game took place in a rain-soaked Ullevi Stadium in Gothenburg. Aberdeen took the lead early in the game through Eric Black. Seven minutes later, a back pass by Alex McLeish left the opposition forward one-on-one with goalkeeper Jim Leighton. He took the ball past Leighton who brought him down for a penalty. The penalty was converted and Real Madrid had equalised, it was 1–1 at half time. The teams could not be separated after 90 minutes, it had ended 1–1, and the game was forced into extra time. Aberdeen took the lead when Mark McGhee's cross met the head of substitute John Hewitt, who headed the ball into the goal. Real Madrid could not recover and at full-time, Aberdeen had won 2–1.

This was followed up with victory in the European Super Cup in December 1983, when Hamburger SV, the reigning European Cup champions, were beaten 2–0 over two legs thanks to goals by Neil Simpson and Mark McGhee at Pittodrie.

As of 2018, Aberdeen are the last club from Scotland to have won a European trophy and the only club from Scotland to have won two European trophies.

Aberdeen's defence of the Cup Winners' Cup in the 1983–84 season began against Akranes in the first round. A 2–1 win away from home was followed by a 1–1 draw at home. Aberdeen knocked out Belgian club Beveren in the second round, then Újpest Dozsa in the third round to set up a semi-final against Porto. Two 0–1 defeats ended Aberdeen's chance of retaining the cup.

In the 1984–85 European Cup, Aberdeen lost in the first round to East German champions BFC Dynamo on penalties after a 3–3 aggregate draw. In the following year's European Cup, Aberdeen knocked out Akranes and Servette in the first two rounds.

The quarter-final draw paired Aberdeen with IFK Göteborg, the Swedish champions. A 2–2 draw at home was followed by a 0–0 draw in Gothenburg, meaning that Aberdeen were knocked out on the away goals rule.

Sir Alex Ferguson's final European campaign at Aberdeen came in the 1986–87 European Cup Winners' Cup. Aberdeen were knocked out in the first round by Sion, the Swiss club winning 4–2 on aggregate.

=== 1986–1996 ===
Ian Porterfield succeeded Alex Ferguson in November 1986. His first and only European campaign began in September 1987 against Irish club Bohemians. A 0–0 draw in Dublin was followed by a 1–0 win at Pittodrie; Jim Bett scored the winning goal. In the second round, Aberdeen were knocked out on the away goals rule by Dutch club Feyenoord.

In 1988, new co-managers Jocky Scott and Alex Smith led Aberdeen into the UEFA Cup. They were drawn with East German club Dynamo Dresden, but lost the tie 0–2 on aggregate. The following year, Aberdeen lost again at the first round stage of the UEFA Cup, this time against Austrian club Rapid Wien on the away goals rule.

After winning the Scottish Cup in 1990, Aberdeen qualified for the 1990–91 European Cup Winners' Cup. After defeating Cypriot cup winners Nea Salamina 5–0 on aggregate, Aberdeen lost in the second round to Legia Warsaw of Poland 0–1 on aggregate. In 1991, Alex Smith's Aberdeen were beaten home and away by Danish club BK 1903 in the first round of the UEFA Cup. Smith was sacked in 1992 and replaced by former captain Willie Miller.

Willie Miller's first European campaign as Aberdeen manager came in the club's last-ever campaign in the European Cup Winners' Cup in 1993. A 7–0 aggregate victory over Icelandic club Valur was followed by a 3–5 defeat over two legs by Italian club Torino, despite Aberdeen taking the lead in both ties.

In the following season, Latvian club Skonto Riga knocked Aberdeen out of the UEFA Cup on the away goals rule after a 0–0 draw in Riga was followed by a 1–1 draw in Aberdeen. Miller was dismissed as manager later in that season. Roy Aitken was appointed to replace him.

After winning the Scottish League Cup in 1995–96, Aberdeen qualified for the UEFA Cup. Following a 4–1 win in Lithuania against Žalgiris Vilnius, Aberdeen set a new record for the heaviest home European defeat in the second leg at Pittodrie by losing 1–3. It was still enough to go through 5–4 on aggregate. A 6–4 aggregate win over Barry Town of Wales in the next round was followed by a 2–0 defeat over two legs by Brøndby in round two, who were then managed by future Aberdeen manager Ebbe Skovdahl.

=== 2000–2007 ===
Aberdeen's first European tie in four years came in the qualifying round of the UEFA Cup in 2000 under the management of Ebbe Skovdahl. Aberdeen were drawn against Irish side Bohemians. In the first tie at Pittodrie, Aberdeen took a 1–0 lead thanks to a goal from Robbie Winters, but Bohemians then equalised and later took the lead with a last minute winner. The return leg saw Aberdeen take the lead when David Morrison nicked the ball off of Robbie Winters, only to see the ball roll past his goalkeeper and into the empty net. The single goal was not enough, however, as Aberdeen went out on the away goals rule again and became the first Scottish team to be knocked out by an Irish team.

Skovdahl's next European campaign came in 2002. A single Darren Mackie goal was enough to see Aberdeen eliminate Moldovan club Nistru Otaci in the qualifying round. Aberdeen were then drawn against Hertha BSC of Germany in the first round. The tie itself remained goalless until the last minute of the second leg, where Michael Preetz scored what proved to be the winning goal for Hertha. Aberdeen were once again knocked out of Europe at an early stage.

Aberdeen failed to qualify for Europe between 2003 and 2006.

=== 2007–2014 ===
Former Birmingham City player and Dunfermline Athletic manager Jimmy Calderwood took over from Steve Paterson in 2004; he had to wait three years, however, before he tasted European action at Aberdeen. His first game in the then UEFA Cup came against the Ukrainian opposition of Dnipro Dnipropetrovsk. The first leg at Pittodrie finished in a 0–0 draw. In the second leg, Aberdeen took the lead midway through the second half when Darren Mackie headed home a Richard Foster cross. Dnipro later equalised through Andriy Vorobei, but thanks to resolute defending and a number of saves from goalkeeper Langfield, Mackie's goal was enough to see Aberdeen through to the group stages - this was the first time Aberdeen had won a European tie on the away goals rule.

In the group stages, Aberdeen were drawn in Group B alongside Panathinaikos, Atlético Madrid, Copenhagen and Lokomotiv Moscow. At that time, the groups contained five teams, with two games being played away and two at home. The first match in Athens at Panathinaikos ended in a 3–0 defeat. Many fans of the famous Gate 13 fans groups of Panathinaikos boycotted the game following an ongoing dispute with the Greek club hierarchy. Greek international Dimitris Salpingidis scored in the tie. The next home game was against Russian side Lokomotiv Moscow. Aberdeen took the lead when Zander Diamond headed in a Barry Nicholson corner, but the Russians equalised when Branislav Ivanović headed in a corner on the stroke of half-time. The game finished 1–1 on a cold night with snow consistently falling. Aberdeen's next game was against Spanish club Atlético Madrid at the Vicente Calderón Stadium, a 0–2 loss. Goals came from Diego Forlán and an own goal from Langfield after a free-kick by Simão had struck the post and hit the 'keeper in the back.

After a number of other group matches ended in draws, Aberdeen surprisingly found themselves in a position to qualify alongside Atlético and Panathinaikos (at the time, three teams qualified for the knock out rounds). Aberdeen's final group game was against Copenhagen, requiring a victory to see them progress to the next round. A 4–0 win over the Danish champions came courtesy of two goals from Jamie Smith, an own goal from Mikael Antonsson and a goal from Richard Foster.

Aberdeen were drawn against Bayern Munich in the first knockout round. Aberdeen opened the scoring in the first leg at Pittodrie when on-loan midfielder Josh Walker curled a shot from outside the box and beat goalkeeper Michael Rensing. First-choice goalkeeper Oliver Kahn did not play in the first leg at Pittodrie, but other stars such as Zé Roberto, Miroslav Klose, Lukas Podolski and Philipp Lahm did play. Bayern equalised a few minutes later when Klose raced on to a flick-on by Luca Toni and scored. Aberdeen then re-took the lead when another on-loan midfielder, Sone Aluko, flicked the ball over the defender Lúcio and hit a volley which beat Rensing again. Bayern equalised when Alan Maybury was adjudged to have handled the ball in the box. Aberdeen goalkeeper Jamie Langfield saved the resulting penalty, however the ball rebounded back to Hamit Altıntop, who scored. The game finished 2–2. The second leg finished in a 1–5 defeat for Aberdeen.

Aberdeen qualified for the newly re-branded UEFA Europa League after finishing fourth in the 2008–09 season. Under new manager Mark McGhee, Aberdeen were drawn against Czech team Sigma Olomouc in the qualifying rounds. The tie ended in a record 1–8 aggregate defeat for Aberdeen, a 1–5 defeat at home was followed by a 0–3 defeat in the Czech Republic.

=== 2014–present ===
Aberdeen failed to qualify for European football between 2010 and 2014. Until Derek McInnes became manager, this was a period when the club struggled in domestic football, specifically under Mark McGhee before an era of stabilisation under Craig Brown. After finishing third in the 2013–14 Scottish Premiership, they qualified for the 2014–15 UEFA Europa League. In July 2014, they comfortably won 8–0 on aggregate in the first qualifying round against Daugava, Irish striker Adam Rooney amongst the goalscorers. In the second qualifying round against Groningen, after a 0–0 draw at Pittodrie they won 2–1 away from home thanks to goals from Rooney and Niall McGinn. They then fell to Spanish club Real Sociedad in the third qualifying round by an aggregate score of 5–2; despite brave performances at the Anoeta Stadium (0–2) and at Pittodrie (2–3), the Dons lost both legs and exited the Europa League for another season. Both Aberdeen manager Derek McInnes and the then Real Sociedad coach Jagoba Arrasate paid tribute to the players' efforts in both ties.

Aberdeen qualified again for the Europa League thanks to finishing second in the 2014–15 Scottish Premiership. It was the first time since the 1993–94 and 1994–95 seasons that they had qualified for Europe in successive campaigns. In the first qualifying round, the club faced Shkëndija of Macedonia. The tie was played in the Philip II Arena in Skopje. The Dons draw 1–1 in Macedonia and then 0–0 at home therefore going through on the away goals rule, the second time they had qualified from a tie in this way. In the second qualifying round, they faced Rijeka of Croatia and beat them 3–0 in Croatia thanks to goals from Considine, Pawlett and McLean. A 2–2 draw at home took them through to the third qualifying round against Kairat of Kazakhstan. The Dons faced a grueling 5,300 kilometre journey to Almaty in the first leg (the club flight stopped in Tallinn on the way to Almaty, then in Turkey on the way home), and lost the game 2–1 – Kenny McLean scored his second goal for the club in the second half. At Pittodrie, Kairat took the lead in the second half and Aberdeen equalised in the 84th minute, again through McLean. But it proved not to be enough to prevent elimination in the Third Qualifying Round, as in the previous season.

After finishing as runners-up in the 2015–16 Scottish Premiership, Aberdeen qualified for the Europa League. In the first round, they were drawn against CS Fola Esch of Luxembourg. Aberdeen secured a 3–1 victory in the first leg at Pittodrie but were beaten 1–0 in Luxembourg. The Dons navigated the Second Round 4–0 on aggregate against FK Ventspils of Latvia, winning 3–0 at home in the first leg and 1–0 away to secure a Third Qualifying Round spot to face NK Maribor of Slovenia. In a tight first leg at Pittodrie, two late goals were scored as the experienced Milivoje Novaković put the Slovenian outfit in front before Jonny Hayes gave Aberdeen hope going to Slovenia. The second leg had drama as Adam Rooney missed a penalty and new signing Jayden Stockley was sent off. Aberdeen's night then deteriorated further as Graeme Shinnie scored a late own goal that bobbled over Joe Lewis' foot, confirming elimination at the same stage for a third year in succession.

Aberdeen qualified for the Europa League for the fourth time in a row with another second-place finish in the 2016–17 Scottish Premiership. As the top Scottish seeds in the tournament, the first qualifying stage was bypassed; in the second round Široki Brijeg were defeated thanks to an away win in Bosnia to set up a tie with Apollon Limassol from Cyprus. Despite winning the first leg at home, a 2–0 defeat in the return meant the end of European interest at the same stage for another season.

Aberdeen finished second in the 2017–18 Scottish Premiership and entered the 2018–19 UEFA Europa League in the second qualifying round. They were drawn against English Premiership team Burnley in a 'Battle of Britain' clash. The first leg ended in a 1–1 draw at a sold-out Pittodrie. Burnley won the second leg 3–1 at Turf Moor after extra time.

Aberdeen once again qualified for the 2019-20 Europa League after a 4th place finish in the 2018-19 Scottish Premiership. Entering the first qualifying round, they took on RoPS Rovaniemi winning 4-2 on aggregate. In the second qualifying round they then took on Georgian side Chikhura Sachkhere, after a 1-1 draw in Georgia, the Dons went on to win 5-0 at Pittodrie. The third qualifying round saw Aberdeen take on HNK Rijeka, two 2-0 losses saw the Scottish side knocked out of the competition, 4-0 on aggregate.

Another 4th place finish in the 2019-20 Scottish Premiership saw Aberdeen qualify for the 2020-21 Europa League, Aberdeen finished fourth place due to the league being suspended on 13 March 2020 due to COVID-19, despite being one point behind 3rd placed Motherwell FC with games still to play. The Dons entered at the first qualifying round, all qualifying rounds were to be contested over one leg rather than the traditional two due to the COVID-19 pandemic. Aberdeen defeated NSÍ Runavík 6-0 at home, seeing them proceed to the second qualifying round to take on Viking FK in Norway. Aberdeen won the game 2-0. The third qualifying round saw the Reds take on giants Sporting CP of Portugal. Unfortunately, although putting in a good performance, the Dons were knocked out after a 1-0 defeat.

== Team statistics ==
=== Matches ===
List of Aberdeen matches in European competitions
Season	Competition	Round	Opponent	1st Leg	2nd Leg	Agg.	Notes	Ref.
1967–68	Cup Winners' Cup	1R	(Iceland) KR Reykjavík	10–0 (H)	4–1 (A)	14–1	—N/a	
1967–68	Cup Winners' Cup	2R	(Belgium) Standard Liège	0–3 (A)	2–0 (H)	2–3	—N/a	
1968–69	Fairs Cup	1R	(Bulgaria) Slavia Sofia	0–0 (A)	2–0 (H)	2–0	—N/a	
1968–69	Fairs Cup	2R	(Spain) Real Zaragoza	2–1 (H)	0–3 (A)	2–4	—N/a	
1970–71	Cup Winners' Cup	1R	(Hungary) Budapest Honvéd	3–1 (H)	1–3 (A)	4–4	Lost on penalties	
1971–72	UEFA Cup	1R	(Spain) Celta Vigo	2–0 (A)	1–0 (H)	3–0	—N/a	
1971–72	UEFA Cup	2R	(Italy) Juventus	0–2 (A)	1–1 (H)	1–3	—N/a	
1972–73	UEFA Cup	1R	(West Germany) Borussia Mönchengladbach	2–3 (H)	3–6 (A)	5–9	—N/a	
1973–74	UEFA Cup	1R	(Republic of Ireland) Finn Harps	4–1 (H)	3–1 (A)	7–2	—N/a	
1973–74	UEFA Cup	2R	(England) Tottenham Hotspur	1–1 (H)	1–4 (A)	2–5	—N/a	
1977–78	UEFA Cup	1R	(Belgium) Molenbeek	0–0 (A)	1–2 (H)	1–2	—N/a	
1978–79	Cup Winners' Cup	1R	(Bulgaria) Marek Dimitrov	2–3 (A)	3–0 (H)	5–3	—N/a	
1978–79	Cup Winners' Cup	2R	(West Germany) Fortuna Düsseldorf	0–3 (A)	2–0 (H)	2–3	—N/a	
1979–80	UEFA Cup	1R	(West Germany) Eintracht Frankfurt	1–1 (H)	0–1 (A)	1–2	—N/a	
1980–81	European Cup	1R	Austria Wien	1–0 (H)	0–0 (A)	1–0	—N/a	
1980–81	European Cup	2R	(England) Liverpool	0–1 (H)	0–4 (A)	0–5	—N/a	
1981–82	UEFA Cup	1R	(England) Ipswich Town	1–1 (A)	3–1 (H)	4–2	—N/a	
1981–82	UEFA Cup	2R	(Romania) Argeș Pitești	3–0 (H)	2–2 (A)	5–2	—N/a	
1981–82	UEFA Cup	3R	(West Germany) Hamburger SV	3–2 (H)	1–3 (A)	4–5	—N/a	
1982–83	Cup Winners' Cup	PR	(Switzerland) Sion	7–0 (H)	4–1 (A)	11–1	—N/a	
1982–83	Cup Winners' Cup	1R	(Albania) Dinamo Tirana	1–0 (H)	0–0 (A)	1–0	—N/a	
1982–83	Cup Winners' Cup	2R	(Poland) Lech Poznań	2–0 (H)	1–0 (A)	3–0	—N/a	
1982–83	Cup Winners' Cup	QF	(West Germany) Bayern Munich	0–0 (A)	3–2 (H)	3–2	—N/a	
1982–83	Cup Winners' Cup	SF	(Belgium) Waterschei	5–1 (H)	0–1 (A)	5–2	—N/a	
1982–83	Cup Winners' Cup	Final	(Spain) Real Madrid	2–1 (N)		Winners	After extra time	
1983–84	Super Cup	Final	(West Germany) Hamburger SV	0–0 (A)	2–0 (H)	2–0	—N/a	
1983–84	Cup Winners' Cup	1R	(Iceland) ÍA Akranes	2–1 (A)	1–1 (H)	3–2	—N/a	
1983–84	Cup Winners' Cup	2R	(Belgium) Beveren	0–0 (A)	4–1 (H)	4–1	—N/a	
1983–84	Cup Winners' Cup	QF	(Hungary) Újpest	0–2 (A)	3–0 (H)	3–2	—N/a	
1983–84	Cup Winners' Cup	SF	(Portugal) Porto	0–1 (A)	0–1 (H)	0–2	—N/a	
1984–85	European Cup	1R	(East Germany) Dynamo Berlin	2–1 (H)	1–2 (A)	3–3	Lost on penalties	
1985–86	European Cup	1R	(Iceland) ÍA Akranes	3–1 (A)	4–1 (H)	7–2	—N/a	
1985–86	European Cup	2R	(Switzerland) Servette	0–0 (A)	1–0 (H)	1–0	—N/a	
1985–86	European Cup	QF	(Sweden) IFK Göteborg	2–2 (H)	0–0 (A)	2–2	Lost on away goals	
1986–87	Cup Winners' Cup	1R	(Switzerland) Sion	2–1 (H)	0–3 (A)	2–4	—N/a	
1987–88	UEFA Cup	1R	(Republic of Ireland) Bohemian	0–0 (A)	1–0 (H)	1–0	—N/a	
1987–88	UEFA Cup	2R	(Netherlands) Feyenoord	2–1 (H)	0–1 (A)	2–2	Lost on away goals	
1988–89	UEFA Cup	1R	(East Germany) Dynamo Dresden	0–0 (H)	0–2 (A)	0–2	—N/a	
1989–90	UEFA Cup	1R	(Austria) Rapid Wien	2–1 (H)	0–1 (A)	2–2	Lost on away goals	
1990–91	Cup Winners' Cup	1R	(Cyprus) Nea Salamina	2–0 (A)	3–0 (H)	5–0	—N/a	
1990–91	Cup Winners' Cup	2R	(Poland) Legia Warsaw	0–0 (H)	0–1 (A)	0–1	—N/a	
1991–92	UEFA Cup	1R	(Denmark) BK 1903	0–1 (H)	0–2 (A)	0–3	—N/a	
1993–94	Cup Winners' Cup	1R	(Iceland) Valur	3–0 (A)	4–0 (H)	7–0	—N/a	
1993–94	Cup Winners' Cup	2R	(Italy) Torino	2–3 (A)	1–2 (H)	3–5	—N/a	
1994–95	UEFA Cup	QR	(Latvia) Skonto	0–0 (A)	1–1 (H)	1–1	Lost on away goals	
1996–97	UEFA Cup	QR	(Lithuania) Žalgiris Vilnius	4–1 (A)	1–3 (H)	5–4	—N/a	
1996–97	UEFA Cup	1R	(Wales) Barry Town	3–1 (H)	3–3 (A)	6–4	—N/a	
1996–97	UEFA Cup	2R	(Denmark) Brøndby	0–2 (H)	0–0 (A)	0–2	—N/a	
2000–01	UEFA Cup	QR	(Republic of Ireland) Bohemian	1–2 (H)	1–0 (A)	2–2	Lost on away goals	
2002–03	UEFA Cup	QR	(Moldova) Nistru Otaci	1–0 (H)	0–0 (A)	1–0	—N/a	
2002–03	UEFA Cup	1R	(Germany) Hertha BSC	0–0 (H)	0–1 (A)	0–1	—N/a	
2007–08	UEFA Cup	1R	(Ukraine) Dnipro Dnipropetrovsk	0–0 (H)	1–1 (A)	1–1	Won on away goals	
2007–08	UEFA Cup	Group B	(Greece) Panathinaikos	0–3 (A)		3rd	—N/a	
2007–08	UEFA Cup	Group B	(Russia) Lokomotiv Moscow	1–1 (H)		3rd	—N/a	
2007–08	UEFA Cup	Group B	(Spain) Atlético Madrid	0–2 (A)		3rd	—N/a	
2007–08	UEFA Cup	Group B	(Denmark) Copenhagen	4–0 (H)		3rd	—N/a	
2007–08	UEFA Cup	3R	(Germany) Bayern Munich	2–2 (H)	1–5 (A)	3–7	—N/a	
2009–10	Europa League	3Q	(Czech Republic) Sigma Olomouc	1–5 (H)	0–3 (A)	1–8	—N/a	
2014–15	Europa League	1Q	(Latvia) Daugava	5–0 (H)	3–0 (A)	8–0	—N/a	
2014–15	Europa League	2Q	(Netherlands) Groningen	0–0 (H)	2–1 (A)	2–1	—N/a	
2014–15	Europa League	3Q	(Spain) Real Sociedad	0–2 (A)	2–3 (H)	2–5	—N/a	
2015–16	Europa League	1Q	(North Macedonia) Shkëndija	1–1 (A)	0–0 (H)	1–1	Won on away goals	
2015–16	Europa League	2Q	(Croatia) Rijeka	3–0 (A)	2–2 (H)	5–2	—N/a	
2015–16	Europa League	3Q	(Kazakhstan) Kairat	1–2 (A)	1–1 (H)	2–3	—N/a	
2016–17	Europa League	1Q	(Luxembourg) Fola Esch	3–1 (H)	0–1 (A)	3–2	—N/a	
2016–17	Europa League	2Q	(Latvia) Ventspils	3–0 (H)	1–0 (A)	4–0	—N/a	
2016–17	Europa League	3Q	(Slovenia) NK Maribor	1–1 (H)	0–1 (A)	1–2	—N/a	
2017–18	Europa League	2Q	(Bosnia and Herzegovina) Široki Brijeg	1–1 (H)	2–0 (A)	3–1	—N/a	
2017–18	Europa League	3Q	(Cyprus) Apollon Limassol	2–1 (H)	0–2 (A)	2–3	—N/a	
2018–19	Europa League	2Q	(England) Burnley	1–1 (H)	1–3 (A)	2–4	After extra time	
2019–20	Europa League	1Q	(Finland) RoPS	2–1 (H)	2–1 (A)	4–2	—N/a	
2019–20	Europa League	2Q	(Georgia (country)) Chikhura Sachkhere	1–1 (A)	5–0 (H)	6–1	—N/a	
2019–20	Europa League	3Q	(Croatia) Rijeka	0–2 (A)	0–2 (H)	0–4	—N/a	
2020–21	Europa League	1Q	(Faroe Islands) NSÍ Runavík	6–0 (H)	—N/a	—N/a	—N/a	
2020–21	Europa League	2Q	(Norway) Viking	—N/a	2–0 (A)	—N/a	—N/a	
2020–21	Europa League	3Q	(Portugal) Sporting CP	—N/a	0–1 (A)	—N/a	—N/a	
2021–22	Europa Conference League	2Q	(Sweden) BK Häcken	5–1 (H)	0–2 (A)	5–3	—N/a	
2021–22	Europa Conference League	3Q	(Iceland) Breiðablik	3–2 (A)	2–1 (H)	5–3	—N/a	
2021–22	Europa Conference League	PO	(Azerbaijan) Qarabağ	0–1 (A)	1–3 (H)	1–4	—N/a	
2023–24	Europa League	PO	(Sweden) BK Häcken	2–2 (A)	1–3 (H)	3–5	—N/a	
2023–24	Europa Conference League	Group G	(Germany) Eintracht Frankfurt	1–2 (A)	2–0 (H)	3rd	—N/a	
2023–24	Europa Conference League	Group G	(Greece) PAOK	2–3 (H)	2–2 (A)	3rd	—N/a	
2023–24	Europa Conference League	Group G	(Finland) HJK	1–1 (H)	2–2 (A)	3rd	—N/a	
2025–26	Europa League	PO	(Romania) FCSB	2–2 (H)	0–3 (A)	2–5	—N/a	
2025–26	Conference League	League Phase	(Ukraine) Shakhtar Donetsk	2–3 (H)	—N/a	35th	—N/a	
2025–26	Conference League	League Phase	(Greece) AEK Athens	0–6 (A)	—N/a	35th	—N/a	
2025–26	Conference League	League Phase	(Cyprus) AEK Larnaca	0–0 (A)	—N/a	35th	—N/a	
2025–26	Conference League	League Phase	(Armenia) Noah	1–1 (H)	—N/a	35th	—N/a	
2025–26	Conference League	League Phase	(France) Strasbourg	0–1 (H)	—N/a	35th	—N/a	
2025–26	Conference League	League Phase	(Czech Republic) Sparta Prague	0–3 (A)	—N/a	35th	—N/a	

Notes

- PR: Preliminary round
- QR: Qualifying round
- 1R: First round
- 2R: Second round
- 3R: Third round
- 1Q: First qualifying round
- 2Q: Second qualifying round
- 3Q: Third qualifying round
- QF: Quarter-finals
- SF: Semi-finals

=== By country ===
Country	Pld	W	D	L	GF	GA
Albania	2	1	1	0	1	0
Armenia	1	0	1	0	1	1
Austria	4	2	1	1	3	2
Azerbaijan	2	0	0	2	1	4
Belgium	8	3	2	3	12	8
Bosnia and Herzegovina	2	1	1	0	3	1
Bulgaria	4	2	1	1	7	3
Croatia	4	1	1	2	5	6
Cyprus	5	3	1	1	7	3
Czech Republic	3	0	0	3	1	11
Denmark	5	1	1	3	4	5
East Germany	4	1	1	2	3	5
England	8	1	3	4	8	16
Faroe Islands	1	1	0	0	6	0
Finland	4	2	2	0	7	5
France	1	0	0	1	0	1
(Georgia (country)) Georgia	2	1	1	0	6	1
Germany/West Germany	18	5	5	8	23	31
Greece	4	0	1	3	4	14
Hungary	4	2	0	2	7	6
Iceland	10	9	1	0	36	8
(Republic of Ireland) Ireland	6	4	1	1	10	4
Italy	4	0	1	3	4	8
Kazakhstan	2	0	1	1	2	3
Latvia	6	4	2	0	13	1
Lithuania	2	1	0	1	5	4
Luxembourg	2	1	0	1	3	2
Moldova	2	1	1	0	1	0
Netherlands	4	2	1	1	4	3
Norway	1	1	0	0	2	0
Poland	4	2	1	1	3	1
Portugal	3	0	0	3	0	3
(North Macedonia) Republic of Macedonia	2	0	2	0	1	1
Romania	4	1	2	1	7	7
Russia	1	0	1	0	1	1
Slovenia	2	0	1	1	1	2
Spain	8	4	0	4	9	12
Sweden	6	1	3	2	10	10
Switzerland	6	4	1	1	14	5
Ukraine	3	0	2	1	3	4
Wales	2	1	1	0	6	4
Total	166	63	45	58	244	206

== Player statistics ==
=== Goal scorers ===
Players in bold are still active at the club. Correct as of 27 November 2025 (v FC Noah home).

Name	UEFA Cup/Europa League	UEFA Europa Conference League	Cup Winners' Cup	European Cup	Super Cup	TOTAL
(Scotland) Mark McGhee	1	0	11	1	1	14
(Scotland) John Hewitt	4	0	5	3	0	12
(Scotland) Drew Jarvie	7	0	3	0	0	10
(Republic of Ireland) Adam Rooney	9	0	0	0	0	9
(Scotland) Joe Harper	5	0	3	0	0	8
(Scotland) Gordon Strachan	3	0	5	0	0	8
(Scotland) Eric Black	1	0	3	3	0	7
(Scotland) Eoin Jess	0	0	6	0	0	6
(Scotland) Neil Simpson	0	0	4	1	1	6
(Scotland) Peter Weir	3	0	3	0	0	6
(England) Sam Cosgrove	6	0	0	0	0	6
(Northern Ireland) Niall McGinn	6	0	0	0	0	6
(Wales) Ryan Hedges	6	0	0	0	0	6
(Scotland) Lewis Ferguson	3	3	0	0	0	6
(Scotland) Frank Munro	0	0	5	0	0	5
(Scotland) Billy Dodds	4	0	0	0	0	4
(Republic of Ireland) Jonny Hayes	4	0	0	0	0	4
(Scotland) Jim Storrie	0	0	4	0	0	4
(North Macedonia) Bojan Miovski	2	2	0	0	0	4
(Scotland) Steve Murray	1	0	2	0	0	3
(Scotland) Jimmy Smith	1	0	2	0	0	3
(Scotland) Kenny McLean	3	0	0	0	0	3
(Cape Verde) Luis Lopes	0	3	0	0	0	3
(United States) Christian Ramirez	0	3	0	0	0	3
(United States) Dante Polvara	1	2	0	0	0	3
(Scotland) Jim Bett	1	0	1	0	0	2
(Scotland) Ryan Christie	2	0	0	0	0	2
(Scotland) Willie Falconer	1	0	0	1	0	2
(Scotland) Jim Forrest	2	0	0	0	0	2
(Scotland) Stephen Glass	2	0	0	0	0	2
(Scotland) Arthur Graham	1	0	1	0	0	2
(Scotland) Brian Irvine	1	0	1	0	0	2
(England) Shaleum Logan	2	0	0	0	0	2
(Scotland) Gary Mackay-Steven	2	0	0	0	0	2
(Scotland) Darren Mackie	2	0	0	0	0	2
(Scotland) Bertie Miller	2	0	0	0	0	2
(Scotland) Joe Miller	1	0	1	0	0	2
(Scotland) Willie Miller	0	0	1	1	0	2
(Scotland) Peter Pawlett	2	0	0	0	0	2
(Scotland) Davie Robb	2	0	0	0	0	2
(Scotland) Craig Robertson	1	0	1	0	0	2
(Scotland) Duncan Shearer	1	0	1	0	0	2
(Scotland) Jamie Smith	2	0	0	0	0	2
(Scotland) Ian Taylor	1	0	1	0	0	2
(Scotland) Andrew Considine	1	1	0	0	0	2
(Slovenia) **Ester Sokler**	1	1	0	0	0	2
(Scotland) **Nicky Devlin**	1	1	0	0	0	2

Players with a single European goal, scored in the European Cup

- (Scotland) Ian Angus
- (Scotland) Stevie Gray
- (Scotland) Frank McDougall
- (Scotland) Billy Stark

Players with a single European goal, scored in the UEFA Cup/Europa League

- (Nigeria) Sone Aluko
- (Wales) Wes Burns
- (Scotland) Zander Diamond
- (Scotland) Ricky Foster
- (Scotland) Brian Grant
- (Scotland) Jim Hermiston
- (Scotland) Paul Kane
- (England) Greg Leigh
- (England) Steve Lovell
- (England) Curtis Main
- (Scotland) Charlie Mulgrew
- (Scotland) Mark Reynolds
- (Scotland) David Rowson
- (Scotland) **Graeme Shinnie**
- (Scotland) Greg Stewart
- (England) Jayden Stockley
- (England) Josh Walker
- (Scotland) Andy Watson
- (Scotland) Alex Willoughby
- (England) Dean Windass
- (Scotland) Robbie Winters
- (Scotland) Scott Wright
- (Scotland) Darren Young
- (Scotland) Connor McLennan

Players with a single European goal, scored in the UEFA Conference League

- (Republic of Ireland) Jamie McGrath
- (England) Angus Macdonald
- (Sweden) Jesper Karlsson
- (Scotland) **Kevin Nisbet**

Players with a single European goal, scored in the European Cup Winners' Cup

- (Scotland) Dougie Bell
- (Scotland) Martin Buchan
- (Netherlands) Hans Gillhaus
- (Scotland) Stuart Kennedy
- (England) Paul Mason
- (Scotland) Alex McLeish
- (Scotland) Chic McLelland
- (Scotland) Tommy McMillan
- (Scotland) Harry Melrose
- (Finland) Mixu Paatelainen
- (Denmark) Jens Petersen
- (England) Lee Richardson
- (Scotland) Paul Wright

== See also ==
- History of Aberdeen F.C.
- List of Aberdeen F.C. records and statistics
- List of Aberdeen F.C. seasons
