= 1985–86 Aberdeen F.C. season =

Aberdeen
1985–86 season
- Chairman: Dick Donald
- Manager: Alex Ferguson
- Scottish Premier Division: 4th
- Scottish Cup: Champion
- Scottish League Cup: Champion
- European Cup: Quarter-final
- Tennents' Sixes: Winners
- Top goalscorer: League: Frank McDougall (14); All: Frank McDougall (20)
- Highest home attendance: 23,000 (vs Celtic, 2 November 1985)
- Lowest home attendance: 8,500 (vs Dundee United, 16 April 1986)
- Average home league attendance: 14,526

Aberdeen competed in the Scottish Premier Division, Scottish Cup, League Cup and European Champions' Cup in season 1985–86.

== Overview ==
Aberdeen finished fourth in the Scottish Premier Division and won the Scottish Cup and Scottish League Cup. In Europe, they reached the quarter finals of the Champions' Cup but lost out to IFK Gothenburg on the away goals rule.

Frank McDougall finished the season as Aberdeen's top scorer with 14 goals in the league and 20 overall, including all four goals in a 4–1 win over Celtic in November.

== Results ==
=== Scottish Premier Division ===
Match Day	Date	Opponent	H/A	Score	Aberdeen Scorer(s)	Attendance
1.	10 August	Hibernian	H	3–0	McDougall (2), Bett	14,846
2.	17 August	Dundee United	A	1–1	McKimmie	14,339
3.	24 August	Motherwell	H	1–1	McKimmie	14,059
4.	31 August	Dundee	A	3–1	Simpson, Stark (2)	7,592
5.	7 September	Heart of Midlothian	H	3–0	Stark, Black, Wright	12,300
6.	14 September	Celtic	A	1–2	McDougall	39,450
7.	21 September	St Mirren	H	1–1	McQueen	12,585
8.	28 September	Rangers	A	3–0	Stark, McLeish, Hewitt	27,599
9.	5 October	Clydebank	H	3–1	McKimmie, Black, McDougall	11,399
10.	12 October	Hibernian	A	1–1	Gray	10,377
11.	19 October	Dundee United	H	3–2	McDougall, Hewitt (2)	15,148
12.	30 October	Heart of Midlothian	A	0–1		12,866
13.	2 November	Celtic	H	4–1	McDougall (4)	23,000
14.	9 November	Dundee	H	4–1	Stark (2), McLeish, McDougall	12,800
15.	16 November	Motherwell	A	1–1	McDougall	4,960
16.	23 November	St Mirren	A	0–1		5,930
17.	12 December	Clydebank	A	1–2	Black	2,095
18.	14 December	Hibernian	H	4–0	McLeish, Angus, J. Miller, Weir	11,819
19.	21 December	Dundee United	A	1–2	Stark	10,085
20.	1 January	Dundee	A	0–0		9,096
21.	4 January	St Mirren	H	3–1	Black (2), Weir	11,500
22.	11 January	Celtic	A	1–1	J. Miller	31,305
23.	18 January	Heart of Midlothian	H	0–1		21,500
24.	1 February	Rangers	A	1–1	J. Miller	29,887
25.	8 February	Clydebank	H	4–1	Black (3), Bett	11,000
26.	19 February	Rangers	H	1–0	Angus	18,700
27.	22 February	Hibernian	A	1–0	Wright	9,500
28.	15 March	St Mirren	A	1–1	W. Miller	4,448
29.	22 March	Dundee	H	0–0		13,013
30.	29 March	Motherwell	A	1–0	Hewitt	4,597
31.	9 April	Motherwell	H	3–2	McDougall, Bett, Weir	10,300
32.	12 April	Celtic	H	0–1		22,000
33.	16 April	Dundee United	H	0–1		8,500
34.	20 April	Heart of Midlothian	A	1–1	Weir	19,047
35.	26 April	Rangers	H	1–1	Hewitt	17,000
36.	3 May	Clydebank	A	6–0	Stark, Hewitt, McDougall (2), McMaster, Weir	2,382

==== Final standings ====
Pos	Team	Pld	W	D	L	GF	GA	GD	Pts	Qualification
2	Heart of Midlothian	36	20	10	6	59	33	+26	50	Qualification for the UEFA Cup first round
3	Dundee United	36	18	11	7	59	31	+28	47	Qualification for the UEFA Cup first round
4	Aberdeen	36	16	12	8	62	31	+31	44	Qualification for the Cup Winners' Cup first round
5	Rangers	36	13	9	14	53	45	+8	35	Qualification for the UEFA Cup first round
6	Dundee	36	14	7	15	45	51	−6	35	

Source: Rsssf
Rules for classification: 1) points; 2) goal difference; 3) number of goals scored.

=== Scottish League Cup ===
Round	Date	Opponent	H/A	Score	Aberdeen Scorer(s)	Attendance
R2	21 August	Ayr United	H	5–0	McQueen, Stark (2), McDougall (2)	12,400
R3	28 August	St Johnstone	A	2–0	Hewitt, McDougall	5,100
QF	4 September	Heart of Midlothian	H	1–0	Black	13,100
SF L1	25 September	Dundee United	A	1–0	Black	12,837
SF L2	9 October	Dundee United	H	1–0	McDougall	20,000
F	27 October	Hibernian	N	3–0	Stark, Black (2)	40,061

=== Scottish Cup ===
Round	Date	Opponent	H/A	Score	Aberdeen Scorer(s)	Attendance
R3	5 February	Montrose	H	4–1	Stark, McLeish, W. Miller, McDougall	9,000
R4	15 February	Arbroath	A	1–0	J. Miller	6,017
R5	8 March	Dundee	A	2–2	Hewitt (2)	13,188
R5 R	12 March	Dundee	H	2–1	Black, Weir	21,000
SF	5 April	Hibernian	N	3–0	Stark, Black, J. Miller	19,165
F	10 May	Heart of Midlothian	N	3–0	Hewitt (2), Stark	62,841

=== European Cup ===
Round	Date	Opponent	H/A	Score	Aberdeen Scorer(s)	Attendance
R1 L1	18 September	(Iceland) Akranes	A	3–1	Stark, Black, Hewitt	7,000
R1 L2	2 October	(Iceland) Akranes	H	4–1	Gray, Simpson, Hewitt, Falconer	14,700
R2 L1	23 October	(Switzerland) Servette	A	0–0		8,000
R2 L2	6 November	(Switzerland) Servette	H	1–0	McDougall	19,000
QF L1	5 March	(Sweden) Gothenburg	H	2–2	W. Miller, Hewitt	20,000
QF L2	19 March	(Sweden) Gothenburg	A	0–0		20,000

== Squad ==
=== Appearances & Goals ===
No.	Pos	Nat	Player	Total		Premier Division		Scottish Cup		League Cup		Europe	
No.	Pos	Nat	Player	Apps	Goals	Apps	Goals	Apps	Goals	Apps	Goals	Apps	Goals
	GK	(Scotland) SCO	Bryan Gunn	13	0	9	0	1	0	2	0	1	0
	GK	(Scotland) SCO	Jim Leighton	41	0	27	0	5	0	4	0	5	0
	DF	(Scotland) SCO	Brian Irvine	1	0	1	0	0	0	0	0	0	0
	DF	(Scotland) SCO	Tommy McIntyre	5	0	5	0	0	0	0	0	0	0
	DF	(Scotland) SCO	Stewart McKimmie	51	3	34	3	5	0	6	0	6	0
	DF	(Scotland) SCO	Alex McLeish	52	4	34	3	6	1	6	0	6	0
	DF	(Scotland) SCO	Tommy McQueen	23	2	17	1	3	0	2	1	1	0
	DF	(Scotland) SCO	Willie Miller (c)	51	3	33	1	6	1	6	0	6	1
	DF	(Scotland) SCO	Brian Mitchell	32	0	23	0	0	0	4	0	5	0
	DF	(Scotland) SCO	Ian Robertson	4	0	4	0	0	0	0	0	0	0
	MF	(Scotland) SCO	Ian Angus	26	2	17	2	4	0	1	0	4	0
	MF	(Scotland) SCO	Jim Bett	37	3	24	3	6	0	3	0	4	0
	MF	(Scotland) SCO	Neale Cooper	38	0	23	0	5	0	4	0	6	0
	MF	(Scotland) SCO	Stevie Gray	21	2	13	1	0	0	4	0	4	1
	MF	(Scotland) SCO	John McMaster	9	1	7	1	2	0	0	0	0	0
	MF	(Scotland) SCO	Joe Miller	22	5	18	3	3	2	0	0	1	0
	MF	(Scotland) SCO	Ian Porteous	7	0	6	0	1	0	0	0	0	0
	MF	(Scotland) SCO	Neil Simpson	36	2	22	1	4	0	6	0	4	1
	MF	(Scotland) SCO	Billy Stark	46	15	30	8	5	3	6	3	5	1
	MF	(Scotland) SCO	Peter Weir	32	6	21	5	4	1	3	0	4	0
	FW	(Scotland) SCO	Eric Black	39	15	26	8	5	2	4	4	4	1
	FW	(Scotland) SCO	Willie Falconer	10	1	8	0	0	0	1	0	1	1
	FW	(Scotland) SCO	John Hewitt	38	14	23	6	4	4	5	1	6	3
	FW	(Scotland) SCO	Frank McDougall	39	20	26	14	4	1	6	4	3	1
	FW	(Scotland) SCO	Paul Wright	14	2	10	2	2	0	0	0	2	0
