= 1986–87 Aberdeen F.C. season =

Aberdeen
1986–87 season
- Chairman: Dick Donald
- Manager: Alex Ferguson (until 6 November); Ian Porterfield
- Scottish Premier Division: 4th
- Scottish Cup: Third round
- Scottish League Cup: Quarter-final
- European Cup Winners' Cup: First round
- Tennents' Sixes: Winners
- Top goalscorer: League: Billy Stark (12); All: John Hewitt; Billy Stark (14 each)
- Highest home attendance: 23,500 vs. Rangers, 2 May 1987; 23,500 vs. Celtic, 3 September 1986
- Lowest home attendance: 6,000 vs. Clydebank, 11 April 1987
- Average home league attendance: 12,787

Aberdeen competed in the Scottish Premier Division, Scottish Cup, Scottish League Cup and European Cup Winners' Cup in season 1986–87.

== Overview ==
Aberdeen lost their highly successful manager Alex Ferguson to English side Manchester United in November 1986. He was replaced by Ian Porterfield. On the field, the club finished in a disappointing fourth place in the Premier Division, and were knocked out of both domestic cup competitions by Celtic. In Europe, they were knocked out of the Cup Winners' Cup by Swiss club FC Sion at the first round stage.

New signings included midfielder Bobby Connor from Dundee and striker Davie Dodds from Swiss club Neuchâtel Xamax.

== Results ==
=== Scottish Premier Division ===
Match Day	Date	Opponent	H/A	Score	Aberdeen Scorer(s)	Attendance
1	9 August	Dundee United	A	1–2	Stark	10,910
2	13 August	Hibernian	H	4–0	Stark, Gray, J. Miller, Angus	12,983
3	16 August	Hamilton Academical	H	2–0	Stark (2)	10,316
4	23 August	Celtic	A	1–1	J. Miller	46,073
5	30 August	Dundee	H	2–0	J. Miller, Hewitt	12,486
6	6 September	St Mirren	A	1–1	Stark	4,435
7	13 September	Heart of Midlothian	H	0–1		15,625
8	20 September	Clydebank	A	3–1	Hewitt, Weir	2,766
9	27 September	Rangers	A	0–2		40,155
10	4 October	Motherwell	H	2–2	W. Miller, Dodds	8,751
11	8 October	Falkirk	A	3–3	Stark, McLeish, Bett	4,800
12	11 October	Dundee United	H	2–0	Hewitt (2)	14,922
13	18 October	Hibernian	A	1–1	Connor	9,127
14	25 October	Hamilton Academical	A	1–0	Bett	3,001
15	1 November	Dundee	A	2–0	Porteous, Dodds	8,200
16	8 November	St Mirren	H	0–0		11,366
17	15 November	Heart of Midlothian	A	1–2	Hewitt	17,108
18	19 November	Clydebank	H	5–0	Stark (2), Connor (2), Hewitt	7,301
19	22 November	Rangers	H	1–0	Dodds	21,733
20	26 November	Celtic	H	1–1	McLeish	22,040
21	29 November	Motherwell	A	1–0	Weir	4,479
22	3 December	Falkirk	H	1–0	Stark	9,253
23	6 December	Dundee United	A	0–0		10,242
24	13 December	Hibernian	H	1–0	Stark	11,003
25	20 December	Celtic	A	1–1	J. Miller	32,624
26	27 December	Hamilton Academical	H	0–0		10,500
27	1 January	Dundee	H	2–1	Wright, Grant	11,000
28	21 January	Heart of Midlothian	H	2–1	Grant, W. Miller	15,030
29	24 January	Rangers	A	0–0		44,000
30	27 January	Clydebank	A	5–0	Hewitt, Dodds, Wright (2), Connor	2,007
31	7 February	Motherwell	H	1–0	Wright	10,000
32	21 February	Falkirk	A	3–0	Stark (2), McLeish	5,000
33	25 February	St Mirren	A	0–1		3,553
34	28 February	Dundee United	H	0–1		14,000
35	7 March	Hibernian	A	1–1	Bett	6,000
36	14 March	Celtic	H	1–0	Irvine	20,000
37	21 March	Hamilton Academical	A	2–0	Bett, Porteous	3,594
38	28 March	St Mirren	H	0–1		7,000
39	4 April	Dundee	A	1–1	Grant	4,346
40	11 April	Clydebank	H	1–1	Irvine	6,000
41	18 April	Heart of Midlothian	A	1–1	Hewitt	12,539
42	25 April	Motherwell	A	2–0	Hewitt, Miller	2,886
43	2 May	Rangers	H	1–1	Irvine	23,500
44	9 May	Falkirk	H	3–1	Hewitt, Miller, Grant	6,500

==== Final standings ====
Pos	Team	Pld	W	D	L	GF	GA	GD	Pts	Qualification or relegation
2	Celtic	44	27	9	8	90	41	+49	63	Qualification for the UEFA Cup first round
3	Dundee United	44	24	12	8	85	34	+51	60	Qualification for the UEFA Cup first round
4	Aberdeen	44	21	16	7	63	29	+34	58	Qualification for the UEFA Cup first round
5	Heart of Midlothian	44	21	14	9	64	43	+21	56	
6	Dundee	44	18	12	14	74	57	+17	48	

Source: Statto
Rules for classification: 1) points; 2) goal difference; 3) number of goals scored.

=== Scottish League Cup ===
Round	Date	Opponent	H/A	Score	Aberdeen Scorer(s)	Attendance
R2	20 August	Alloa Athletic	H	4–0	J. Miller, Hewitt (2), Connor	7,000
R3	27 August	Clyde	H	3–1	Stark (2), J. Miller	8,081
QF	3 September	Celtic	H	1–1	Connor	23,500

=== Scottish Cup ===
Round	Date	Opponent	H/A	Score	Aberdeen Scorer(s)	Attendance
R3	1 February	Celtic	H	2–2	Bett, Hewitt	23,000
R3 R	4 February	Celtic	A	0–0		55,405
R3 2R	9 February	Celtic	N	0–1		21,255

=== European Cup Winners' Cup ===
Round	Date	Opponent	H/A	Score	Aberdeen Scorer(s)	Attendance
R1 L1	17 September	(Switzerland) FC Sion	H	2–1	Bett, Wright	12,312
R1 L2	1 October	(Switzerland) FC Sion	A	0–3		11,800

== Squad ==
=== Appearances & Goals ===
No.	Pos	Nat	Player	Total		Premier Division		Scottish Cup		League Cup		Europe	
No.	Pos	Nat	Player	Apps	Goals	Apps	Goals	Apps	Goals	Apps	Goals	Apps	Goals
	GK	(Scotland) SCO	Bryan Gunn	4	0	2	0	0	0	2	0	0	0
	GK	(Scotland) SCO	Jim Leighton	48	0	42	0	3	0	1	0	2	0
	DF	(Scotland) SCO	Brian Irvine	23	0	20	0	0	0	2	0	1	0
	DF	(Scotland) SCO	Tommy McIntyre	4	0	4	0	0	0	0	0	0	0
	DF	(Scotland) SCO	Stewart McKimmie	45	0	37	0	3	0	3	0	2	0
	DF	(Scotland) SCO	Alex McLeish	48	0	40	0	3	0	3	0	2	0
	DF	(Scotland) SCO	Tommy McQueen	1	0	1	0	0	0	0	0	0	0
	DF	(Scotland) SCO	Willie Miller (c)	43	0	36	0	3	0	2	0	2	0
	DF	(Scotland) SCO	Brian Mitchell	22	0	17	0	0	0	3	0	2	0
	DF	(Scotland) SCO	David Robertson	42	0	34	0	3	0	3	0	2	0
	DF	(Scotland) SCO	Ian Robertson	4	0	4	0	0	0	0	0	0	0
	MF	(Scotland) SCO	Ian Angus	2	1	2	1	0	0	0	0	0	0
	MF	(Scotland) SCO	Jim Bett	45	6	38	4	3	1	2	0	2	1
	MF	(Scotland) SCO	Bobby Connor	39	6	32	4	3	0	3	2	1	0
	MF	(Scotland) SCO	Brian Grant	18	4	15	4	3	0	0	0	0	0
	MF	(Scotland) SCO	Stevie Gray	16	1	13	1	0	0	3	0	0	0
	MF	(Scotland) SCO	John McMaster	2	0	2	0	0	0	0	0	0	0
	MF	(Scotland) SCO	Ian Porteous	9	2	9	2	0	0	0	0	0	0
	MF	(Scotland) SCO	Neil Simpson	8	0	8	0	0	0	0	0	0	0
	MF	(Scotland) SCO	Billy Stark	40	14	36	12	0	0	2	2	2	0
	MF	(Scotland) SCO	Peter Weir	40	2	35	2	1	0	2	0	2	0
	FW	(Scotland) SCO	Davie Dodds	29	4	25	4	3	0	0	0	1	0
	FW	(Scotland) SCO	Willie Falconer	7	0	6	0	0	0	1	0	0	0
	FW	(Scotland) SCO	John Hewitt	42	14	33	11	4	1	3	2	2	0
	FW	(Scotland) SCO	Frank McDougall	1	0	1	0	0	0	0	0	0	0
	FW	(Scotland) SCO	Joe Miller	34	8	28	6	3	0	3	2	0	0
	FW	(Scotland) SCO	Paul Wright	31	5	25	4	3	0	1	0	2	1
