= 1986 Scottish Cup final =

1986 Scottish Cup Final
- Event: 1985–86 Scottish Cup
Aberdeen	Heart of Midlothian
3	0
- Date: 10 May 1986
- Venue: Hampden Park, Glasgow
- Referee: Hugh Alexander
- Attendance: 62,841

The 1986 Scottish Cup Final was played on 10 May 1986 at Hampden Park in Glasgow and was the final of the 111th Scottish Cup. The previous winners were Celtic, who had beaten Dundee United in the 1985 final, but they were knocked out by Hibernian at the quarter-final stage.

The Final was contested by Aberdeen and Heart of Midlothian, who had narrowly missed out on the league title just a week earlier, finishing second behind Celtic after losing to Dundee on the final day of the season.

Aberdeen won the match 3–0, with goals from John Hewitt and Billy Stark. It was Aberdeen's fourth Scottish Cup triumph in five years, and was to be the last trophy won under the management of Alex Ferguson, who departed for Manchester United the following season.

== Match details ==
10 May 1986

Aberdeen	3–0	Heart of Midlothian
Hewitt 5', 49'; Stark 75'	Report

Hampden Park, Glasgow
Attendance: 62,841
Referee: Hugh Alexander

Aberdeen:
GK	(Scotland) Jim Leighton
DF	(Scotland) Stewart McKimmie
DF	(Scotland) Alex McLeish
DF	(Scotland) Willie Miller (c)
DF	(Scotland) Tommy McQueen
MF	(Scotland) Jim Bett
MF	(Scotland) Neale Cooper
MF	(Scotland) John McMaster	(substituted off) ?'
MF	(Scotland) Peter Weir
FW	(Scotland) John Hewitt	(substituted off) ?'
FW	(Scotland) Frank McDougall
Substitutes:
MF	(Scotland) Billy Stark	(substituted on) ?'
FW	(Scotland) Joe Miller	(substituted on) ?'
Manager:
(Scotland) Alex Ferguson

Heart of Midlothian:
GK	(Scotland) Henry Smith
DF	(Scotland) Walter Kidd (c)	Sent off (straight red)
DF	(Scotland) Sandy Jardine
DF	(Scotland) Craig Levein
DF	(Scotland) Brian Whittaker
MF	(Scotland) Gary Mackay
MF	(Scotland) Neil Berry
MF	(Scotland) Kenny Black
FW	(Scotland) John Colquhoun
FW	(Scotland) Sandy Clark
FW	(Scotland) John Robertson
Substitutes:
DF	(Scotland) George Cowie
MF	(Scotland) Billy MacKay
Manager:
(Scotland) Alex MacDonald

== Road to the final ==
Aberdeen				Round	Heart of Midlothian			
Home team	Score	Away team	Aberdeen scorer(s)	Round	Home team	Score	Away team	Hearts scorer(s)
Aberdeen	4–1	Montrose	Stark, McLeish, W. Miller, McDougall	Round Three	Hearts	3–2	Rangers	Colin McAdam; Gary Mackay; John Robertson
Arbroath	0–1	Aberdeen	J. Miller	Round Four	Hamilton Academical	1–2	Hearts	John Robertson; Gary Mackay
Dundee	2–2	Aberdeen	Hewitt	Quarter-finals	Hearts	4–1	St Mirren	John Colquhoun; John Robertson (pen.); Kenny Black
Aberdeen	2–1	Dundee	Black, Weir	Replay	Hearts	4–1	St Mirren	John Colquhoun; John Robertson (pen.); Kenny Black
Aberdeen	3–0	Hibernian	Billy Stark 20'; Eric Black 35'; Joe Miller 81'	Semi-finals	Hearts	1–0	Dundee United	John Colquhoun 13'
