= 1984–85 Aberdeen F.C. season =

Aberdeen
1984–85 season
- Chairman: Dick Donald
- Manager: Alex Ferguson
- Scottish Premier Division: 1st (champions)
- Scottish Cup: Semi-final
- Scottish League Cup: Second round
- European Cup: First round
- Top goalscorer: League: Frank McDougall (22); All: Frank McDougall (24)
- Highest home attendance: 23,000 (5 times) (vs. Rangers, 15 September 1984) (vs. Celtic, 8 December 1984) (vs. (Rangers, 19 January 1985) (vs. Heart of Midlothian, 13 March 1985) (vs. (Celtic, 27 April 1985)
- Lowest home attendance: 11,000 (vs Morton, 12 January 1985)
- Average home league attendance: 16,152

Aberdeen competed in the Scottish Premier Division, Scottish Cup, League Cup and European Champions' Cup in season 1984–85.

== Overview ==
Aberdeen won their fourth Scottish League championship and reached the semi-finals of the Scottish Cup, but were knocked out in the first round of the Scottish League Cup and the European Cup. New signing Frank McDougall scored 24 goals in his debut season at Pittodrie as Aberdeen won the Premier Division with a record points total of 59 from a possible 72.

== Results ==
=== Scottish Premier Division ===
| Match Day | Date | Opponent | H/A | Score | Aberdeen Scorer(s) | Attendance |
|---|---|---|---|---|---|---|
| 1. | 11 August | Dundee | H | 3–2 | Stark, Black (2) | 14,700 |
| 2. | 18 August | St Mirren | A | 2–0 | Stark, Falconer | 5,445 |
| 3. | 25 August | Dundee United | A | 2–0 | Black (2) | 13,033 |
| 4. | 1 September | Hibernian | H | 4–1 | McKimmie, Black, Simpson, McDougall | 14,500 |
| 5. | 8 September | Morton | A | 3–0 | Stark, Black, Falconer | 5,000 |
| 6. | 15 September | Rangers | H | 0–0 | | 23,000 |
| 7. | 22 September | Dumbarton | A | 2–0 | W. Miller, Falconer | 4,500 |
| 8. | 29 September | Heart of Midlothian | H | 4–0 | Angus, Falconer, McDougall (2) | 16,344 |
| 9. | 6 October | Celtic | A | 1–2 | McDougall | 31,418 |
| 10. | 13 October | Dundee | A | 2–1 | McDougall, Stark | 10,990 |
| 11. | 20 October | St Mirren | H | 4–0 | Stark, Porteous, McDougall (2) | 14,100 |
| 12. | 6 November | Hibernian | A | 3–0 | Stark, McDougall, Black | 8,000 |
| 13. | 10 November | Morton | H | 3–1 | W. Miller, Simpson, McDougall | 14,500 |
| 14. | 17 November | Rangers | A | 2–1 | Stark, McDougall | 44,000 |
| 15. | 24 November | Dumbarton | H | 1–0 | McDougall | 13,200 |
| 16. | 1 December | Heart of Midlothian | A | 2–1 | Stark, Cowan | 10,037 |
| 17. | 8 December | Celtic | H | 4–2 | McKimmie, Black (2), McDougall | 23,000 |
| 18. | 15 December | Dundee | H | 0–0 | | 14,000 |
| 19. | 22 December | Dundee United | H | 0–1 | | 16,354 |
| 20. | 29 December | St Mirren | A | 2–2 | McDougall (2) | 6,287 |
| 21. | 2 January | Dundee United | A | 1–2 | McQueen | 21,944 |
| 22. | 5 January | Hibernian | H | 2–0 | McKimmie, Weir | 13,700 |
| 23. | 12 January | Morton | H | 5–0 | Cooper, McDougall, Weir, Mitchell, Cowan | 11,000 |
| 24. | 19 January | Rangers | H | 5–1 | McQueen, Black, McDougall (3) | 23,000 |
| 25. | 2 February | Dumbarton | A | 2–0 | Black, Stark | 3,500 |
| 26. | 9 February | Heart of Midlothian | H | 2–2 | Simpson, Weir | 16,240 |
| 27. | 23 February | Celtic | A | 0–2 | | 48,834 |
| 28. | 2 March | St Mirren | H | 3–0 | Black, Stark, Cowan | 12,000 |
| 29. | 16 March | Dundee | A | 4–0 | Stark (2), Black, Simpson | 9,161 |
| 30. | 23 March | Hibernian | A | 5–0 | McQueen, Black (3), Hewitt | 9,000 |
| 31. | 30 March | Dundee United | H | 4–2 | Stark, Cowan, Hewitt (2) | 15,600 |
| 32. | 6 April | Rangers | A | 2–1 | Cowan, Black | 23,437 |
| 33. | 20 April | Dumbarton | H | 4–0 | Stark, McLeish, Angus, Kay (Own goal) | 12,500 |
| 34. | 27 April | Celtic | H | 1–1 | W. Miller | 23,000 |
| 35. | 4 May | Heart of Midlothian | A | 3–0 | McDougall (3) | 8,251 |
| 36. | 11 May | Morton | A | 2–1 | Stark, McDougall | 3,600 |

==== Final standings ====
| Pos | Team | Pld | W | D | L | GF | GA | GD | Pts | Qualification or relegation |
|---|---|---|---|---|---|---|---|---|---|---|
| 1 | Aberdeen (C) | 36 | 27 | 5 | 4 | 89 | 26 | +63 | 59 | Qualification for the European Cup first round |
| 2 | Celtic | 36 | 22 | 8 | 6 | 77 | 30 | +47 | 52 | Qualification for the Cup Winners' Cup first round |
| 3 | Dundee United | 36 | 20 | 7 | 9 | 67 | 33 | +34 | 47 | Qualification for the UEFA Cup first round |
| 4 | Rangers | 36 | 13 | 12 | 11 | 47 | 38 | +9 | 38 | Qualification for the UEFA Cup first round |
| 5 | St Mirren | 36 | 17 | 4 | 15 | 51 | 56 | −5 | 38 | Qualification for the UEFA Cup first round |

Source: Statto
Rules for classification: 1) points; 2) goal difference; 3) number of goals scored.
(C) Champions

=== Scottish League Cup ===
| Round | Date | Opponent | H/A | Score | Aberdeen Scorer(s) | Attendance |
|---|---|---|---|---|---|---|
| R2 | 22 August | Airdrieonians | A | 1–3 | Stark | 5,000 |

=== Scottish Cup ===
| Round | Date | Opponent | H/A | Score | Aberdeen Scorer(s) | Attendance |
|---|---|---|---|---|---|---|
| R3 | 30 January | Alloa Athletic | H | 5–0 | Stark (3), Simpson, Hewitt | 13,500 |
| R4 | 16 February | Raith Rovers | A | 2–1 | McDougall | 10,000 |
| R5 | 9 March | Heart of Midlothian | A | 1–1 | Black | 23,900 |
| R5 R | 13 March | Heart of Midlothian | H | 1–0 | Stark | 23,000 |
| SF | 13 April | Dundee United | N | 0–0 | | 18,485 |
| SF R | 17 April | Dundee United | N | 1–2 | Angus | 10,771 |

=== European Cup ===
| Round | Date | Opponent | H/A | Score | Aberdeen Scorer(s) | Attendance |
|---|---|---|---|---|---|---|
| R1 L1 | 19 September | (East Germany) Dinamo Berlin | H | 2–1 | Black (2) | 20,000 |
| R1 L2 | 3 October | (East Germany) Dinamo Berlin | A | 1–2 | Angus | 20,000 |

== Squad ==
=== Appearances & Goals ===
| No. | Pos | Nat | Player | Total | | Premier Division | | Scottish Cup | | League Cup | | Europe | |
| No. | Pos | Nat | Player | Apps | Goals | Apps | Goals | Apps | Goals | Apps | Goals | Apps | Goals |
|---|---|---|---|---|---|---|---|---|---|---|---|---|---|
| | GK | (Scotland) SCO | Bryan Gunn | 2 | 0 | 2 | 0 | 0 | 0 | 0 | 0 | 0 | 0 |
| | GK | (Scotland) SCO | Jim Leighton | 43 | 0 | 34 | 0 | 6 | 0 | 1 | 0 | 2 | 0 |
| | DF | (Scotland) SCO | Stewart McKimmie | 41 | 3 | 34 | 3 | 4 | 0 | 1 | 0 | 2 | 0 |
| | DF | (Scotland) SCO | Alex McLeish | 39 | 1 | 30 | 1 | 6 | 0 | 1 | 0 | 2 | 0 |
| | DF | (Scotland) SCO | Tommy McQueen | 42 | 3 | 35 | 3 | 4 | 0 | 1 | 0 | 2 | 0 |
| | DF | (Scotland) SCO | Willie Miller (c) | 44 | 3 | 35 | 3 | 6 | 0 | 1 | 0 | 2 | 0 |
| | DF | (Scotland) SCO | Brian Mitchell | 16 | 1 | 13 | 1 | 3 | 0 | 0 | 0 | 0 | 0 |
| | MF | (Scotland) SCO | Ian Angus | 35 | 4 | 28 | 2 | 5 | 1 | 0 | 0 | 2 | 1 |
| | MF | (Scotland) SCO | Doug Bell | 29 | 0 | 22 | 0 | 5 | 0 | 1 | 0 | 1 | 0 |
| | MF | (Scotland) SCO | Neale Cooper | 27 | 1 | 20 | 1 | 5 | 0 | 0 | 0 | 2 | 0 |
| | MF | (Scotland) SCO | Brian Grant | 1 | 0 | 0 | 0 | 0 | 0 | 1 | 0 | 0 | 0 |
| | MF | (Scotland) SCO | John McMaster | 1 | 0 | 1 | 0 | 0 | 0 | 0 | 0 | 0 | 0 |
| | MF | (Scotland) SCO | Joe Miller | 1 | 0 | 1 | 0 | 0 | 0 | 0 | 0 | 0 | 0 |
| | MF | (Scotland) SCO | Ian Porteous | 17 | 1 | 13 | 1 | 2 | 0 | 1 | 0 | 1 | 0 |
| | MF | (Scotland) SCO | Neil Simpson | 42 | 5 | 33 | 4 | 6 | 1 | 1 | 0 | 2 | 0 |
| | MF | (Scotland) SCO | Billy Stark | 40 | 20 | 32 | 15 | 5 | 4 | 1 | 1 | 2 | 0 |
| | MF | (Scotland) SCO | Peter Weir | 18 | 3 | 16 | 3 | 2 | 0 | 0 | 0 | 0 | 0 |
| | FW | (Scotland) SCO | Eric Black | 35 | 20 | 27 | 17 | 6 | 1 | 0 | 0 | 2 | 2 |
| | FW | (Scotland) SCO | Steve Cowan | 20 | 5 | 16 | 5 | 3 | 0 | 1 | 0 | 0 | 0 |
| | FW | (Scotland) SCO | Willie Falconer | 19 | 4 | 16 | 4 | 0 | 0 | 1 | 0 | 2 | 0 |
| | FW | (Scotland) SCO | John Hewitt | 29 | 4 | 22 | 3 | 5 | 1 | 0 | 0 | 2 | 0 |
| | FW | (Scotland) SCO | Frank McDougall | 30 | 24 | 28 | 22 | 2 | 2 | 0 | 0 | 0 | 0 |
| | FW | (Scotland) SCO | Paul Wright | 1 | 0 | 0 | 0 | 0 | 0 | 1 | 0 | 0 | 0 |
