= 1985–86 Scottish Cup =

Tournament details
- Country: Scotland

Final positions
- Champions: Aberdeen
- Runners-up: Heart of Midlothian

The 1985–86 Scottish Cup was the 101st staging of Scotland's most prestigious football knockout competition. The Cup was won by Aberdeen who defeated Heart of Midlothian (Hearts) in the final.

== First round ==
Home team	Score	Away team
Albion Rovers	8 – 1	Gala Fairydean
Berwick Rangers	0 – 0	Cowdenbeath
Dunfermline Athletic	2 – 0	Raith Rovers
Meadowbank Thistle	3 – 2	East Stirlingshire
Queen's Park	3 – 0	Buckie Thistle
St Johnstone	1 – 0	Queen of the South

=== Replay ===
Home team	Score	Away team
Cowdenbeath	0 – 2	Berwick Rangers

== Second round ==
Home team	Score	Away team
Hawick Royal Albert	1 – 2	St Johnstone
Nairn County	1 – 1	Meadowbank Thistle
Peterhead	1 – 2	Arbroath
Fort William	0 – 0	Stirling Albion
Queen's Park	2 – 1	Albion Rovers
Stenhousemuir	0 – 0	Whitehill Welfare
Stranraer	1 – 2	Berwick Rangers
Threave Rovers	0 – 5	Dunfermline Athletic

=== Replays ===
Home team	Score	Away team
Meadowbank Thistle	1 – 2	Nairn County
Stirling Albion	6 – 0	Fort William
Whitehill Welfare	2 – 3	Stenhousemuir

== Third round ==
Home team	Score	Away team
Aberdeen	4 – 1	Montrose
Hamilton Academical	2 – 1	Forfar Athletic
Hibernian	2 – 0	Dunfermline Athletic
Airdrieonians	0 – 0	Partick Thistle
Arbroath	0 – 0	Clyde
Ayr United	1 – 0	Stenhousemuir
Berwick Rangers	2 – 3	Alloa Athletic
Celtic	2 – 0	St Johnstone
Clydebank	0 – 0	Falkirk
Dundee United	4 – 0	Greenock Morton
East Fife	1 – 1	St Mirren
Hearts	3 – 2	Rangers
Kilmarnock	1 – 0	Stirling Albion
Motherwell	1 – 1	Brechin City
Nairn County	0 – 7	Dundee
Queen's Park	1 – 0	Dumbarton

=== Replays ===
Home team	Score	Away team
Brechin City	1 – 1	Motherwell
St Mirren	3 – 1	East Fife
Clyde	1 – 2	Arbroath
Falkirk	1 – 0	Clydebank
Partick Thistle	1 – 2	Airdrieonians

==== Second Replay ====
Home team	Score	Away team
Brechin City	0 – 2	Motherwell

== Fourth round ==
Home team	Score	Away team
Alloa Athletic	1 – 2	Motherwell
St Mirren	1 – 1	Falkirk
Hamilton Academical	1 – 2	Hearts
Dundee	2 – 0	Airdrieonians
Hibernian	1 – 0	Ayr United
Arbroath	0 – 1	Aberdeen
Celtic	2 – 1	Queen's Park
Dundee United	1 – 1	Kilmarnock

=== Replays ===
Home team	Score	Away team
Falkirk	0 – 3	St Mirren
Kilmarnock	0 – 1	Dundee United

== Quarter-finals ==
Home team	Score	Away team
Hearts	4 – 1	St Mirren
Dundee	2 – 2	Aberdeen
Hibernian	4 – 3	Celtic
Motherwell	0 – 1	Dundee United

=== Replay ===
Home team	Score	Away team
Aberdeen	2 – 1	Dundee

== Semi-finals ==
5 April 1986

Aberdeen	3–0	Hibernian
Billy Stark 20'; Eric Black 35'; Joe Miller 81'

Dens Park, Dundee
Attendance: 19,165
Referee: Kenny Hope

5 April 1986

Hearts	1–0	Dundee United
John Colquhoun 13'

Hampden Park, Glasgow
Attendance: 30,872
Referee: Brian McGinley

== Final ==
10 May 1986

Aberdeen	3–0	Hearts
Hewitt 5', 49'; Stark 75'	Report

Hampden Park, Glasgow
Attendance: 62,841
Referee: Hugh Alexander

== See also ==
- 1985–86 in Scottish football
- 1985–86 Scottish League Cup
