= 1983 European Super Cup =

Hamburger SV	Aberdeen
(West Germany)	(Scotland)
0	2
- on aggregate

First leg
Hamburger SV	Aberdeen
0	0
- Date: 22 November 1983
- Venue: Volksparkstadion, Hamburg
- Referee: Vojtech Christov (Czechoslovakia)
- Attendance: 15,000

Second leg
Aberdeen	Hamburger SV
2	0
- Date: 20 December 1983
- Venue: Pittodrie Stadium, Aberdeen
- Referee: Horst Brummeier (Austria)
- Attendance: 22,500

The 1983 UEFA Super Cup was a two-legged match contested between the 1982–83 European Cup winners Hamburger SV, and the 1982–83 European Cup Winners' Cup winners Aberdeen.

The first leg at the Volksparkstadion in Hamburg finished 0–0. In the second leg at Pittodrie Stadium, Aberdeen added their second European trophy with a 2–0 victory over the West Germans with goals coming from Mark McGhee and Neil Simpson. Aberdeen became the first Scottish team to win the UEFA Super Cup.

== Details ==
=== First leg ===
22 November 1983
20:00 CET

Hamburger SV (West Germany)	0–0	(Scotland) Aberdeen
	Report

Volksparkstadion, Hamburg
Attendance: 15,000
Referee: Vojtech Christov (Czechoslovakia)

Hamburger SV	Aberdeen

GK	1	(West Germany) Uli Stein
CB	(West Germany) Ditmar Jakobs
SW	(West Germany) Holger Hieronymus
CB	(West Germany) Bernd Wehmeyer
LB	(West Germany) Jürgen Groh
RM	(West Germany) Michael Schröder
CM	(West Germany) Jimmy Hartwig	(substituted off) 46'
CM	(West Germany) Felix Magath (c)
LM	(West Germany) Wolfgang Rolff
CF	(West Germany) Dieter Schatzschneider
CF	(West Germany) Thomas von Heesen
Substitutes:
FW	(West Germany) Wolfram Wuttke	(substituted on) 46'
Manager:
(Austria) Ernst Happel

GK	1	(Scotland) Jim Leighton
RB	2	(Scotland) Neale Cooper
LB	3	(Scotland) Doug Rougvie	(yellow card) 44'
CM	4	(Scotland) Neil Simpson
CB	5	(Scotland) Alex McLeish
CB	6	(Scotland) Willie Miller (c)
RM	7	(Scotland) Gordon Strachan
CF	8	(Scotland) John Hewitt
CF	9	(Scotland) Mark McGhee
CM	10	(Scotland) Dougie Bell
LW	11	(Scotland) Peter Weir
Manager
(Scotland) Alex Ferguson

=== Second leg ===
20 December 1983
19:30 GMT

Aberdeen (Scotland)	2–0	(West Germany) Hamburger SV
Simpson 47'; McGhee 65'	Report

Pittodrie Stadium, Aberdeen
Attendance: 22,500
Referee: Horst Brummeier (Austria)

Aberdeen	Hamburger SV

GK	1	(Scotland) Jim Leighton
RB	2	(Scotland) Stewart McKimmie
LB	3	(Scotland) John McMaster
CM	4	(Scotland) Neil Simpson
CB	5	(Scotland) Alex McLeish
CB	6	(Scotland) Willie Miller (c)
RM	7	(Scotland) Gordon Strachan
CF	8	(Scotland) John Hewitt	(substituted off) 65'
CF	9	(Scotland) Mark McGhee
CM	10	(Scotland) Dougie Bell
LW	11	(Scotland) Peter Weir
Substitutes:
FW		(Scotland) Eric Black	(substituted on) 65'
Manager
(Scotland) Alex Ferguson

GK	1	(West Germany) Uli Stein
RB	(West Germany) Manfred Kaltz	(substituted off) 68'
CB	(West Germany) Ditmar Jakobs
SW	(West Germany) Holger Hieronymus
CB	(West Germany) Bernd Wehmeyer
LB	(West Germany) Jürgen Groh
RM	(West Germany) Michael Schröder
CM	(West Germany) Jimmy Hartwig
CM	(West Germany) Felix Magath (c)
LM	(West Germany) Wolfgang Rolff
CF	(West Germany) Dieter Schatzschneider	(substituted off) 41'
Substitutes:
FW	(West Germany) Wolfram Wuttke	(substituted on) 41'
MF	(Denmark) Allan Hansen	(substituted on) 68'
Manager:
(Austria) Ernst Happel

== See also ==
- 1983–84 European Cup
- 1983–84 European Cup Winners' Cup
- 1983–84 Aberdeen F.C. season
- Aberdeen F.C. in European football
