= Peter Weir (footballer) =

Scottish footballer

Personal information
- Full name: Peter Russell Weir
- Date of birth: 18 January 1958 (age 68)
- Place of birth: Johnstone, Scotland
- Height: 1.83 m (6 ft 0 in)
- Position: Winger

Youth career
- Neilston Juniors

Senior career*
Years	Team	Apps	(Gls)
1978–1981	St Mirren	60	(4)
1981–1987	Aberdeen	159	(23)
1987–1989	Leicester City	28	(2)
1989–1990	St Mirren	28	(6)
1990–1992	Ayr United	40	(1)
Total		315	(36)

International career
1980–1983	Scotland	6	(0)
- * Club domestic league appearances and goals

Peter Russell Weir (born 18 January 1958) is a Scottish former footballer, best known for his time with Aberdeen, who played as a winger.

== Playing career ==
Having been a supporter of Aberdeen as a boy, Peter joined the club from St Mirren in 1981 for £300,000 plus Ian Scanlon, which was then a club record; Alex McLeish, who had attended Barrhead High School and played in youth teams alongside Weir, was already at the club. He had been brought to St Mirren in 1978 by Alex Ferguson who left the Paisley club within days, but soon became manager of Aberdeen and sought to make his former signing part of his new team.

Weir made 237 appearances and scored 38 goals whilst at Pittodrie, and was capped by Scotland on six occasions. He won two League titles and three Scottish Cups, as well as the European Cup Winners' Cup in 1983, playing a crucial role in the final.

In December 1987, Weir left the Dons to move across the border to sign for Leicester City for £80,000. Upon leaving Leicester in 1989, he returned to St Mirren and later played for Ayr United.

== Coaching career ==
Weir later returned to Aberdeen in its youth system set-up.

In November 2018, he was one of four inductees into the club's Hall of Fame.

== Career statistics ==
=== Club ===
Appearances and goals by club, season and competition
Club	Season	League			National Cup		League Cup		Europe		Total	
Club	Season	Division	Apps	Goals	Apps	Goals	Apps	Goals	Apps	Goals	Apps	Goals
St Mirren	1978–79	Scottish Premier Division	6	0	–	–	–	–	–	–	6+	0+
St Mirren	1979–80	Scottish Premier Division	26	2	–	–	–	–	–	–	26+	2+
St Mirren	1980–81	Scottish Premier Division	28	2	–	–	–	–	–	–	28+	2+
St Mirren	Total		60	4	-	-	-	-	-	-	80	5
Aberdeen	1981–82	Scottish Premier Division	25	2	3	1	10	2	4	3	42	8
Aberdeen	1982–83	Scottish Premier Division	31	6	5	3	5	0	11	2	52	11
Aberdeen	1983–84	Scottish Premier Division	27	5	4	2	8	0	6	1	45	8
Aberdeen	1984–85	Scottish Premier Division	16	3	2	0	0	0	0	0	18	3
Aberdeen	1985–86	Scottish Premier Division	21	5	4	1	3	0	4	0	32	6
Aberdeen	1986–87	Scottish Premier Division	34	2	1	0	2	0	2	0	39	2
Aberdeen	1987–88	Scottish Premier Division	5	0	0	0	1	0	3	0	9	0
Aberdeen	Total		159	23	19	7	29	2	30	6	237	38
Leicester City	1987–88	Second Division	18	2	–	–	–	–	–	–	18+	2+
Leicester City	1988–89	Second Division	10	0	–	–	–	–	–	–	10+	0+
Leicester City	Total		28	2	-	-	-	-	-	-	28+	2+
St Mirren	1988–89	Scottish Premier Division	16	6	–	–	–	–	–	–	16+	6+
St Mirren	1989–90	Scottish Premier Division	12	0	–	–	–	–	–	–	12+	0+
St Mirren	Total		28	6	-	-	-	-	-	-	32	7
Ayr United	1990–91	Scottish First Division	29	1	–	–	–	–	–	–	29+	1+
Ayr United	1991–92	Scottish First Division	11	0	–	–	–	–	–	–	11+	0+
Ayr United	Total		40	1	-	-	-	-	-	-	40+	1+
Career total			315	36	19+	7+	29+	2+	30+	6+	417+	53+

=== International ===
Appearances and goals by national team and year
National team	Year	Apps	Goals
Scotland	1980	4	0
Scotland	1981	—	
Scotland	1982	—	
Scotland	1983	2	0
Total		6	0

== Honours ==
Aberdeen

- Scottish Premier Division: 1983–84, 1984–85
- Scottish Cup: 1981–82, 1982–83, 1983–84, 1985–86
- Scottish League Cup: 1985–86
- UEFA Cup Winners' Cup: 1982–83
- UEFA Super Cup: 1983
