= Brian Mitchell (footballer) =

Scottish footballer (born 1963)

Personal information
- Full name: Charles Brian Mitchell
- Date of birth: 30 July 1963 (age 63)
- Place of birth: Stonehaven, Scotland
- Height: 6 ft 1 in (1.85 m)
- Position: Defender

Youth career
- –1981: King Street Belmont

Senior career*
Years	Team	Apps	(Gls)
1981–1987	Aberdeen	64	(1)
1987–1992	Bradford City	178	(9)
1992–1993	Bristol City	16	(0)
1993–1994	Hull City	9	(0)
Total		267	(10)
- * Club domestic league appearances and goals

Charles Brian Mitchell (born 30 July 1963) is a Scottish former professional footballer who played in both Scotland and England, making over 250 league appearances for four teams.

== Life and career ==
Mitchell was born in Stonehaven, Aberdeenshire. He began his football career with King Street Belmont before signing professional forms with Aberdeen in 1981. He stayed with Aberdeen until 1987, and made 65 league appearances. Mitchell signed with Bradford City in February 1987, and in a spell of a little over five years, made 178 league appearances. After leaving Bradford in 1992, he enjoyed one season spells with both Bristol City and Hull City, before retiring in 1994. He then returned to the Aberdeen area where he worked in sports development for the local council.

== Career statistics ==
Club	Seasons	League			Scottish Cup		League Cup		Europe		Total	
Club	Seasons	Division	Apps	Goals	Apps	Goals	Apps	Goals	Apps	Goals	Apps	Goals
Aberdeen	1981-82	Scottish Premier Division	1	0	0	0	0	0	0	0	1	0
Aberdeen	1982-83	Scottish Premier Division	1	0	0	0	1	0	0	0	2	0
Aberdeen	1983-84	Scottish Premier Division	9	0	2	0	1	0	2	0	14	0
Aberdeen	1984-85	Scottish Premier Division	13	1	3	0	0	0	0	0	16	1
Aberdeen	1985-86	Scottish Premier Division	23	0	0	0	4	0	5	0	32	0
Aberdeen	1986-87	Scottish Premier Division	17	0	0	0	3	0	2	0	22	0
Aberdeen	Total		64	1	5	0	9	0	9	0	87	1
