= 1981–82 Scottish Cup =

Tournament details
- Country: Scotland

Final positions
- Champions: Aberdeen
- Runners-up: Rangers

The 1981–82 Scottish Cup was the 97th staging of Scotland's most prestigious football knockout competition. The Cup was won by Aberdeen who defeated Rangers in the final.

== First round ==
| Home team | Score | Away team |
|---|---|---|
| Civil Service Strollers | 3 – 3 | Cowdenbeath |
| Stenhousemuir | 2 – 5 | Berwick Rangers |
| Stirling Albion | 1 – 2 | Clyde |
| Fraserburgh | 1 – 1 | Clachnacuddin |
| Stranraer | 1 – 1 | East Fife |
| Arbroath | 0 – 2 | Meadowbank Thistle |

=== Replays ===
| Home team | Score | Away team |
|---|---|---|
| Clachnacuddin | 3 – 2 | Fraserburgh |
| Cowdenbeath | 6 – 1 | Civil Service Strollers |
| East Fife | 4 – 1 | Stranraer |

== Second round ==
| Home team | Score | Away team |
|---|---|---|
| Albion Rovers | 2 – 1 | Clachnacuddin |
| Cowdenbeath | 1 – 1 | Gala Fairydean |
| Inverness Caledonian | 1 – 3 | Brechin City |
| Alloa Athletic | 4 – 1 | Hawick Royal Albert |
| Clyde | 0 – 0 | Berwick Rangers |
| Coldstream | 0 – 2 | Meadowbank Thistle |
| Montrose | 0 – 0 | Elgin City |
| East Fife | 2 – 3 | Forfar Athletic |

=== Replays ===
| Home team | Score | Away team |
|---|---|---|
| Gala Fairydean | 3 – 2 | Cowdenbeath |
| Berwick Rangers | 1 – 3 | Clyde |
| Elgin City | 0 – 0 | Montrose |

==== Second Replay ====
| Home team | Score | Away team |
|---|---|---|
| Montrose | 2 – 1 | Elgin City |

== Third round ==
| Home team | Score | Away team |
|---|---|---|
| Gala Fairydean | 1 – 2 | St Johnstone |
| Kilmarnock | 1 – 0 | Montrose |
| Rangers | 6 – 2 | Albion Rovers |
| Alloa Athletic | 2 – 1 | Ayr United |
| Brechin City | 2 – 4 | Dundee United |
| Clyde | 2 – 2 | Meadowbank Thistle |
| East Stirlingshire | 1 – 4 | Hearts |
| Partick Thistle | 1 – 2 | Dumbarton |
| Airdrieonians | 1 – 2 | Queen's Park |
| Celtic | 4 – 0 | Queen of the South |
| Clydebank | 2 – 1 | Dunfermline Athletic |
| Dundee | 1 – 0 | Raith Rovers |
| Hamilton Academical | 0 – 0 | Forfar Athletic |
| Hibernian | 2 – 0 | Falkirk |
| Motherwell | 0 – 1 | Aberdeen |
| St Mirren | 2 – 1 | Greenock Morton |

=== Replays ===
| Home team | Score | Away team |
|---|---|---|
| Meadowbank Thistle | 4 – 2 | Clyde |
| Forfar Athletic | 3 – 2 | Hamilton Academical |

== Fourth round ==
| Home team | Score | Away team |
|---|---|---|
| Dundee | 3 – 0 | Meadowbank Thistle |
| Aberdeen | 1 – 0 | Celtic |
| Clydebank | 0 – 2 | St Mirren |
| Dundee United | 1 – 1 | Hibernian |
| Hearts | 0 – 1 | Forfar Athletic |
| Kilmarnock | 3 – 1 | St Johnstone |
| Queen's Park | 2 – 0 | Alloa Athletic |
| Rangers | 4 – 0 | Dumbarton |

=== Replay ===
| Home team | Score | Away team |
|---|---|---|
| Hibernian | 1 – 1 | Dundee United |

==== Second Replay ====
| Home team | Score | Away team |
|---|---|---|
| Dundee United | 3 – 0 | Hibernian |

== Quarter-finals ==
| Home team | Score | Away team |
|---|---|---|
| Aberdeen | 4 – 2 | Kilmarnock |
| Queen's Park | 1 – 2 | Forfar Athletic |
| Rangers | 2 – 0 | Dundee |
| St Mirren | 1 – 0 | Dundee United |

== Semi-finals ==
3 April 1982

| Aberdeen | 1–1 | St Mirren |
|---|---|---|
| Gordon Strachan 66' (pen.) | | Frank McDougall 61' |

Celtic Park, Glasgow
Attendance: 16,782
Referee: Hugh Alexander

3 April 1982

| Rangers | 0–0 | Forfar Athletic |

Hampden Park, Glasgow
Attendance: 15,878

=== Replays ===
7 April 1982

| Aberdeen | 3–2 | St Mirren |
|---|---|---|
| Mark McGhee 6'; Neil Simpson 35'; Peter Weir 74' | | Frank McAvennie 17'; Doug Somner 56' |

Dens Park, Dundee
Attendance: 15,633
Referee: Hugh Alexander

6 April 1982

| Rangers | 3–1 | Forfar Athletic |

Hampden Park, Glasgow
Attendance: 11,864

== Final ==
22 May 1982

| Aberdeen | 4–1 (a.e.t.) | Rangers |
|---|---|---|
| McLeish 32'; McGhee 93'; Strachan 103'; Cooper 110' | | MacDonald 15' |

Hampden Park, Glasgow
Attendance: 53,788
Referee: Brian McGinlay
