= Neil Simpson =

Scottish footballer

Personal information
- Full name: Neil Alexander Simpson
- Date of birth: 15 November 1961 (age 64)
- Place of birth: Hackney, London, England
- Height: 1.78 m (5 ft 10 in)
- Position: Midfielder

Senior career*
Years	Team	Apps	(Gls)
1978–1990	Aberdeen	205	(19)
1990–1991	Newcastle United	4	(0)
1991–1993	Motherwell	33	(1)
1993	Cove Rangers		
Total		242	(20)

International career
1983–1988	Scotland	5	(0)
- * Club domestic league appearances and goals

Neil Alexander Simpson (born 15 November 1961) is a Scottish former footballer, who played for Aberdeen, Newcastle United, Motherwell and Scotland.

Simpson, nicknamed "Simmy", was born in London to Scottish parents who soon moved back to Newmachar in their native Aberdeenshire, where he was brought up. Joining Aberdeen from local junior side Middlefield Wasps, he made 310 appearances in all competitions (27 as substitute) and scored 31 goals.

== Playing career ==
After breaking into the Aberdeen first team at the end of 1980, Simpson finished the season as a first-team regular. Until recurring injuries curtailed his appearances from the spring of 1986, he was a key player for the Dons. A reliable ball-winner, he won his first major honour for the team he had supported as a boy in the 1982 Scottish Cup. Between 1982 and 1986, Simpson's Pittodrie career gained him a list of domestic winners medals that included two Scottish League Championships, three Scottish Cups and a Scottish League Cup.

Simpson played in the 1981–82 UEFA Cup campaign which saw the Dons make their first-ever run of success in Europe by progressing to the Third Round at the expense of Bobby Robson's Ipswich Town and FC Argeş Piteşti of Romania. In 1982–83, he played in every one of the matches of the Dons' 1983 European Cup Winners Cup campaign, scoring a goal in the 3–2 victory over FC Bayern Munich in the second leg of the quarter-finals and becoming one of the "Gothenburg Greats" who lifted the trophy after beating Real Madrid in the 1983 Final. The following season, Simpson was in the team that reached the semi-finals of the 1984 European Cup Winners Cup and he scored a goal when Aberdeen won the 1983 UEFA Super Cup. In 1985–86, he helped the team to the quarter-finals of the 1986 European Champions Cup.

In March 1986, Simpson suffered an injury which kept him out for the rest of the season. On 9 August 1986, four minutes into the new season, he incurred an ankle injury that restricted him to only eight league appearances in the spring of 1987. He was never to fully recover. He made only 15 league appearances in 1987–88 and 16 in 1988–89.

Simpson made the tackle that injured Ian Durrant of Rangers in October 1988, leaving him out of action for two and a half years. This further increased the hostility between supporters of both clubs, which exists to this day. In 1993, Simpson and Durrant settled out of court for an undisclosed sum after Durrant sued for damages.

Simpson's own injury problems continued, restricting him to nine league appearances 1989–90 and a move to Newcastle United saw him play a mere four times. He went to Motherwell for 1991–92 where he spent two seasons before leaving for Highland Football League side Cove Rangers, where he ended his playing career in October 1993.

Simpson was awarded a testimonial match by Aberdeen in 2012, which was played against a Manchester United XI on 14 August 2012.

=== International ===
Having played in the Scotland Under-17 and Under-18 sides and captained the Under-21 team, Simpson made his full Scotland debut in the penultimate British Home Championship against Northern Ireland at Hampden, which ended in a goalless draw. In the 1983–84 season he appeared in two friendlies, beating Uruguay 2–0 and losing 2–0 to France. His last two matches for Scotland were against England in the Rous Cup, drawing 0–0 at Hampden in 1987 and losing 1–0 at Wembley the next year.

== Coaching career ==
After retiring from playing, Simpson became an SFA Community Development Officer in Moray. He returned to Aberdeen in 2001 and became their Head of Youth.

== Career statistics ==
=== Club ===
Appearances and goals by club, season and competition
Club	Season	League			National Cup		League Cup		Europe		Total	
Club	Season	Division	Apps	Goals	Apps	Goals	Apps	Goals	Apps	Goals	Apps	Goals
Aberdeen	1978–79	Scottish Premier Division	0	0	0	0	1	0	0	0	1	0
Aberdeen	1979–80	Scottish Premier Division	0	0	0	0	0	0	0	0	0	0
Aberdeen	1980–81	Scottish Premier Division	16	2	0	0	0	0	0	0	16	2
Aberdeen	1981–82	Scottish Premier Division	29	4	5	2	3	0	5	0	42	6
Aberdeen	1982–83	Scottish Premier Division	33	5	5	2	7	0	11	3	56	10
Aberdeen	1983–84	Scottish Premier Division	24	2	4	0	7	1	10	2	45	5
Aberdeen	1984–85	Scottish Premier Division	33	4	6	1	1	0	2	0	42	5
Aberdeen	1985–86	Scottish Premier Division	22	1	4	0	6	0	4	1	36	2
Aberdeen	1986–87	Scottish Premier Division	8	0	0	0	0	0	0	0	8	0
Aberdeen	1987–88	Scottish Premier Division	15	1	4	0	3	0	2	0	24	1
Aberdeen	1988–89	Scottish Premier Division	16	0	5	0	5	0	2	0	28	0
Aberdeen	1989–90	Scottish Premier Division	9	0	1	0	1	0	1	0	12	0
Aberdeen	Total		205	19	34	5	34	1	37	6	310	31
Newcastle United	1990–91	Second Division	4	0	0	0	1	0	-	-	5	0
Newcastle United	Total		4	0	0	0	1	0	-	-	5	0
Motherwell	1991–92	Scottish Premier Division	21	0	-	-	-	-	-	-	21+	0+
Motherwell	1992–93	Scottish Premier Division	12	1	-	-	-	-	-	-	12+	1+
Motherwell	Total		33	1	3	0	2	0	0	0	38	1
Cove Rangers	1993–94	Highland League	-	-	-	-	-	-	-	-	-	-
Cove Rangers	Total		-	-	-	-	-	-	-	-	-	-
Career total			242+	20+	37+	5+	37+	1+	37+	6+	353+	32+

=== International ===
Appearances and goals by national team and year
National team	Year	Apps	Goals
Scotland	1983	2	0
Scotland	1984	1	0
Scotland	1985	—	
Scotland	1986	—	
Scotland	1987	1	0
Scotland	1988	1	0
Total		5	0

== See also ==
- List of Scotland international footballers born outside Scotland
