= 1981–82 Aberdeen F.C. season =

Aberdeen
1981–82 season
- Chairman: Dick Donald
- Manager: Alex Ferguson
- Scottish Premier Division: 2nd place
- Scottish Cup: Winners
- Scottish League Cup: Semi-final
- UEFA Cup: 3rd round
- Top goalscorer: League: John Hewitt (11); All: Gordon Strachan (20)
- Highest home attendance: 24,000 (3 times) vs. Ipswich Town, 30 September 1981 vs. SV Hamburg, 25 November 1981 vs. Celtic, 13 February 1982
- Lowest home attendance: 6,000 (vs Partick Thistle, 3 May 1982)
- Average home league attendance: 12,883

Aberdeen competed in the Scottish Premier Division, Scottish Cup, League Cup and UEFA Cup in season 1981–82.

They finished second in the Scottish Premier Division and won the Scottish Cup for the first time since 1970. In Europe, they reached the third round of the UEFA Cup, their longest run in European competition, after knocking out the holders, Ipswich Town.

Peter Weir became the most expensive player in Scottish football when he was signed from St Mirren for £300,000.

== Results ==
=== Scottish Premier Division ===
Match Day	Date	Opponent	H/A	Score	Aberdeen Scorer(s)	Attendance
1.	29 August	Dundee United	A	1–4	McLeish	10,598
2.	5 September	Celtic	H	1–3	Strachan	18,825
3.	12 September	Partick Thistle	A	2–0	McCall, Cowan	3,606
4.	19 September	Hibernian	H	1–0	Simpson	10,852
5.	26 September	Airdrieonians	A	4–0	McLeish, Hewitt, Weir (2)	3,000
6.	3 October	Morton	H	2–0	Rougvie, Watson	11,007
7.	10 October	Rangers	A	0–0		28,000
8.	17 October	St Mirren	A	2–1	Watson (2)	6,870
9.	24 October	Dundee	H	2–1	Rougvie, McCall	11,506
10.	31 October	Dundee United	H	1–1	Black	11,035
11.	7 November	Celtic	A	1–2	Strachan	29,326
12.	14 November	Partick Thistle	H	2–1	Watson, Harrow	11,193
13.	21 November	Hibernian	A	1–1	Simpson	7,600
14.	28 November	Airdrieonians	H	0–0		8,030
15.	5 December	Morton	A	1–2	Hewitt	3,102
16.	30 January	Celtic	H	1–3	McMaster	20,000
17.	3 February	Partick Thistle	A	0–0		2,317
18.	6 February	Morton	H	0–0		7,217
19.	20 February	Airdrieonians	A	3–0	Hewitt, McGhee (2)	3,500
20.	27 February	Dundee	H	0–0		8,961
21.	10 March	Hibernian	H	3–1	Strachan, Cooper, Jarvie	8,691
22.	13 March	Rangers	A	3–1	Cooper, Cowan, Watson	31,305
23.	17 March	Dundee	A	3–0	Cowan, Simpson, Hewitt	6,126
24.	20 March	Dundee United	H	2–1	Hewitt, McLeish	12,056
25.	27 March	Celtic	A	1–0	Kennedy	30,000
26.	10 April	Hibernian	A	3–0	Strachan, McGhee, Jarvie	8,000
27.	14 April	St Mirren	H	4–1	Rougvie (2), Strachan, Simpson	12,119
28.	17 April	Morton	A	1–2	McGhee	3,000
29.	21 April	Rangers	H	3–1	McGhee, Rougvie, Black	15,700
30.	24 April	Airdrieonians	H	2–0	McGhee, Black	8,000
31.	1 May	Dundee	A	5–0	McLeish, Harrow, Bell, McCall, Glennie	6,415
32.	3 May	Partick Thistle	H	3–1	McCall, Hewitt, Watson	6,000
33.	5 May	Dundee United	A	2–1	Hewitt (2)	6,587
34.	7 May	St Mirren	H	5–1	Strachan (2), Cooper, McGhee (2)	9,000
35.	12 May	St Mirren	A	2–0	Rougvie, McLeish	3,942
36.	15 May	Rangers	H	4–0	Hewitt (3), Jackson	18,000

==== Final standings ====
Pos	Team	Pld	W	D	L	GF	GA	GD	Pts	Qualification or relegation
1	Celtic (C)	36	24	7	5	79	33	+46	55	Qualification for the European Cup first round
2	Aberdeen	36	23	7	6	71	29	+42	53	Qualification for the Cup Winners' Cup first round
3	Rangers	36	16	11	9	57	45	+12	43	Qualification for the UEFA Cup first round
4	Dundee United	36	15	10	11	61	38	+23	40	Qualification for the UEFA Cup first round
5	St Mirren	36	14	9	13	49	52	−3	37	

Source: Statto
Rules for classification: 1) points; 2) goal difference; 3) number of goals scored.
(C) Champions

=== Scottish League Cup ===
==== Group stage ====
Round	Date	Opponent	H/A	Score	Aberdeen Scorer(s)	Attendance
G3	8 August	Kilmarnock	H	3–0	Kennedy, McGhee (2)	9,000
G3	12 August	Heart of Midlothian	A	0–1		10,500
G3	15 August	Airdrieonians	H	3–0	Strachan, Hewitt, Weir	7,000
G3	19 August	Heart of Midlothian	H	3–0	Strachan, Hewitt, Bell	8,600
G3	22 August	Kilmarnock	A	3–0	Strachan (2), McGhee	3,100
G3	26 August	Airdrieonians	A	0–0		3,000

==== Group 3 final table ====
Team	Pld	W	D	L	GF	GA	GD	Pts
Aberdeen	6	4	1	1	12	1	+11	9
Kilmarnock	6	2	2	2	5	8	−3	6
Heart of Midlothian	6	2	1	3	5	9	−4	5
Airdrieonians	6	1	2	3	4	8	−4	4

==== Knockout stage ====
Round	Date	Opponent	H/A	Score	Aberdeen Scorer(s)	Attendance
QF L1	2 September	Berwick Rangers	H	5–0	Cooper, Strachan (2), Bell, McCall	6,500
QF L2	23 September	Berwick Rangers	A	3–0	McGhee, McMaster, Harrow	1,200
SF L1	10 October	Dundee United	A	1–0	Weir	13,100
SF L2	28 October	Dundee United	H	0–3		12,837

=== Scottish Cup ===
Round	Date	Opponent	H/A	Score	Aberdeen Scorer(s)	Attendance
R3	23 January	Motherwell	A	1–0	Hewitt	12,679
R4	13 February	Celtic	H	1–0	Hewitt	24,000
QF	6 March	Kilmarnock	H	4–2	Strachan (2), McGhee, Simpson	12,000
SF	3 April	St Mirren	N	1–1	Strachan	16,782
SF R	7 April	St Mirren	N	3–2	McGhee, Simpson, Weir	15,663
F	22 May	Rangers	N	4–1	Strachan, McGhee, McLeish, Cooper	53,788

=== UEFA Cup ===
Round	Date	Opponent	H/A	Score	Aberdeen Scorer(s)	Attendance
R1 L1	16 September	(England) Ipswich Town	A	1–1	Hewitt	18,535
R1 L2	30 September	(England) Ipswich Town	H	3–1	Strachan, Weir (2)	24,000
R2 L1	21 October	(Romania) FC Argeş Piteşti	H	3–0	Strachan, Weir, Hewitt	22,000
R2 L2	4 November	(Romania) FC Argeş Piteşti	A	2–2	Strachan, Hewitt	8,760
R3 L1	25 November	(West Germany) SV Hamburg	H	3–2	Watson, Black, Hewitt	24,000
R3 L2	9 December	(West Germany) SV Hamburg	A	1–3	McGhee	45,000

== Squad ==
=== Appearances & Goals ===
No.	Pos	Nat	Player	Total		Premier Division		Scottish Cup		League Cup		Europe	
No.	Pos	Nat	Player	Apps	Goals	Apps	Goals	Apps	Goals	Apps	Goals	Apps	Goals
	GK	(Scotland) SCO	Jim Leighton	58	0	36	0	6	0	10	0	6	0
	DF	(Scotland) SCO	Andy Harrow	11	3	6	2	0	0	5	1	0	0
	DF	(Scotland) SCO	Stuart Kennedy	54	2	34	1	5	0	9	1	6	0
	DF	(Scotland) SCO	Alex McLeish	50	6	32	5	6	1	8	0	4	0
	DF	(Scotland) SCO	Willie Miller (c)	58	0	36	0	6	0	10	0	6	0
	DF	(Scotland) SCO	Brian Mitchell	1	0	1	0	0	0	0	0	0	0
	DF	(Scotland) SCO	Doug Rougvie	43	0	28	0	5	0	5	0	5	0
	MF	(Scotland) SCO	Ian Angus	3	0	1	0	0	0	1	0	1	0
	MF	(Scotland) SCO	Dougie Bell	27	3	13	1	4	0	8	2	2	0
	MF	(Scotland) SCO	Neale Cooper	46	5	27	3	5	1	8	1	6	0
	MF	(Scotland) SCO	Steve Cowan	14	3	13	3	1	0	0	0	0	0
	MF	(Scotland) SCO	Derek Hamilton	3	0	1	0	1	0	1	0	0	0
	MF	(Scotland) SCO	John McMaster	48	2	31	1	5	0	8	1	4	0
	MF	(Scotland) SCO	Neil Simpson	42	6	29	4	5	2	3	0	5	0
	MF	(Scotland) SCO	Gordon Strachan	50	20	30	7	6	4	8	6	6	3
	MF	(Scotland) SCO	Andy Watson	45	7	30	6	3	0	6	0	6	1
	MF	(Scotland) SCO	Peter Weir	42	8	25	2	3	1	10	2	4	3
	FW	(Scotland) SCO	Eric Black	17	4	13	3	2	0	0	0	2	1
	FW	(Scotland) SCO	John Hewitt	45	19	25	11	6	2	8	2	6	4
	FW	(Scotland) SCO	Drew Jarvie	16	2	10	2	1	0	5	0	0	0
	FW	(Scotland) SCO	Walker McCall	14	5	8	4	0	0	4	1	2	0
	FW	(Scotland) SCO	Mark McGhee	53	16	31	8	6	3	10	4	6	1
