= 1983–84 Aberdeen F.C. season =

Aberdeen F.C.
1983–84 season
- Chairman: Dick Donald
- Manager: Alex Ferguson
- Scottish Premier Division: 1st (Champions)
- Scottish Cup: Winners
- Scottish League Cup: Semi-final
- UEFA Cup Winners' Cup: Semi-final
- UEFA Super Cup: Winners
- Top goalscorer: League: Mark McGhee; Gordon Strachan (13 each); All: Mark McGhee (24)
- Highest home attendance: 23,000 (vs Celtic, 4 February 1984)
- Lowest home attendance: 9,650 (vs Raith Rovers, 24 August 1983)
- Average home league attendance: 17,220

Aberdeen competed in the Scottish Premier Division, Scottish Cup, League Cup and European Cup Winners' Cup in season 1983–84. They won their third Scottish League championship, won the Scottish Cup for the third successive year and won the 1983 European Super Cup. They also reached the semi-finals of both the League Cup and the European Cup Winners' Cup.

== Results ==
=== Scottish Premier Division ===
Match Day	Date	Opponent	H/A	Score	Aberdeen Scorer(s)	Attendance
1.	20 August	Dundee	H	3–0	Strachan, Hewitt, McGeachie	14,304
2.	3 September	St Johnstone	H	5–0	Miller, Stark, Black (2), McGhee	12,400
3.	10 September	Motherwell	A	1–1	McGhee	6,217
4.	17 September	Rangers	A	2–0	McGhee (2)	27,500
5.	24 September	Dundee United	H	1–2	Strachan	21,100
6.	1 October	Heart of Midlothian	A	2–0	Weir (2)	18,200
7.	8 October	St Mirren	H	5–0	Miller, Stark (2), McGhee, Falconer	13,300
8.	15 October	Hibernian	A	1–2	Rougvie	7,000
9.	22 October	Celtic	H	3–1	McLeish, Strachan, Hewitt	22,800
10.	29 October	Dundee	A	3–1	Strachan, Bell, Weir	7,849
11.	5 November	St Johnstone	A	5–0	Strachan, Hewitt (3), Weir	6,074
12.	12 November	Rangers	H	3–0	Simpson, Hewitt, Porteous	22,800
13.	19 November	Heart of Midlothian	H	2–0	Rougvie, Simpson	19,800
14.	26 November	Dundee United	A	2–0	Strachan, Bell	16,902
15.	3 December	Motherwell	H	3–1	Strachan, Falconer, McGhee	17,700
16.	10 December	Celtic	A	0–0		25,867
17.	17 December	Hibernian	H	2–1	McGhee, Blackley	14,000
18.	24 December	St Mirren	A	3–0	McLeish, McGhee, Bell	6,654
19.	31 December	Dundee	H	5–2	Strachan (2), Hewitt, Weir, McKinlay	18,250
20.	7 January	Rangers	A	1–1	Hewitt	37,500
21.	4 February	Celtic	H	1–0	Hewitt	23,000
22.	11 February	Motherwell	A	4–0	Strachan (2), Hewitt, Black	6,051
23.	25 February	Hibernian	A	2–0	Black, McGhee	8,500
24.	3 March	St Mirren	H	2–0	Strachan, Hewitt	14,500
25.	31 March	Celtic	A	0–1		19,193
26.	2 April	Heart of Midlothian	H	1–1	Porteous	16,240
27.	7 April	Motherwell	H	2–1	Strachan, McGhee	15,500
28.	18 April	Dundee United	H	5–1	Rougvie (2), Black, McGhee (2)	19,562
29.	21 April	St Johnstone	A	2–0	Stark, McGhee	6,197
30.	28 April	Dundee	A	1–0	Black	6,663
31.	30 April	St Johnstone	H	1–0	Hewitt	11,500
32.	2 May	Heart of Midlothian	A	1–0	McKimmie	14,000
33.	5 May	Hibernian	H	2–2	Porteous, Stark	17,000
34.	7 May	Dundee United	A	0–0		7,990
35.	9 May	Rangers	H	0–0		16,200
36.	12 May	St Mirren	A	2–3	Stark, Money	3,450

==== Final standings ====
Pos	Team	Pld	W	D	L	GF	GA	GD	Pts	Qualification or relegation
1	Aberdeen (C)	36	25	7	4	78	21	+57	57	Qualification for the European Cup first round
2	Celtic	36	21	8	7	80	41	+39	50	Qualification for the Cup Winners' Cup first round
3	Dundee United	36	18	11	7	67	39	+28	47	Qualification for the UEFA Cup first round
4	Rangers	36	15	12	9	53	41	+12	42	Qualification for the UEFA Cup first round
5	Heart of Midlothian	36	10	16	10	38	47	−9	36	Qualification for the UEFA Cup first round

Source: Statto
Rules for classification: 1) points; 2) goal difference; 3) number of goals scored.
(C) Champions

=== Scottish League Cup ===
==== Second round ====
Round	Date	Opponent	H/A	Score	Aberdeen Scorer(s)	Attendance
R2 L1	24 August	Raith Rovers	H	9–0	Porteous, Stark (3), Black (4), Hewitt	9,650
R2 L2	27 August	Raith Rovers	A	3–0	Stark, Hewitt (2)	3,000

==== Group stage ====
Round	Date	Opponent	H/A	Score	Aberdeen Scorer(s)	Attendance
G3	31 August	Meadowbank Thistle	H	4–0	Black, Stark, McGhee (2)	10,000
G3	7 September	St Johnstone	A	1–0	Miller	5,100
G3	5 October	Dundee	H	0–0		13,200
G3	26 October	St Johnstone	H	1–0	Simpson	12,700
G3	9 November	Meadowbank Thistle	A	3–1	Hewitt, Porteous, Own goal	2,700
G3	30 November	Dundee	A	2–1	McGhee, Bell	11,019

==== Group 3 Final table ====
Team	Pld	W	D	L	GF	GA	GD	Pts
Aberdeen	6	5	1	0	11	2	+9	11
Dundee	6	3	2	1	8	4	+4	8
Meadowbank Thistle	6	1	2	3	4	10	−6	4
St Johnstone	6	0	1	5	2	9	−7	1

==== Knockout stage ====
Round	Date	Opponent	H/A	Score	Aberdeen Scorer(s)	Attendance
SF L1	22 February	Celtic	H	0–0		20,074
SF L2	10 March	Celtic	A	0–1		41,169

=== Scottish Cup ===
Aberdeen won the Scottish Cup for the third successive season after beating Celtic in the final at Hampden Park in May 1984.

Round	Date	Opponent	H/A	Score	Aberdeen Scorer(s)	Attendance
R3	13 February	Kilmarnock	H	1–1	Weir	15,000
R3 R	15 February	Kilmarnock	A	3–1	Miller, Strachan, Weir	9,580
R4	18 February	Clyde	A	2–0	Cooper, Angus	5,800
R5	17 March	Dundee United	H	0–0		22,000
R5 R	28 March	Dundee United	A	1–0	McGhee	16,094
SF	14 April	Dundee	N	2–0	Strachan, Porteous	17,654
F	19 May	Celtic	N	2–1	McGhee, Black	58,900

=== European Cup Winners' Cup ===
After winning the trophy the previous season, Aberdeen qualified for the 1983–84 European Cup Winners' Cup as holders.

Round	Date	Opponent	H/A	Score	Aberdeen Scorer(s)	Attendance
R1 L1	14 September	(Iceland) Akranes	A	2–1	McGhee (2)	5,500
R1 L2	28 September	(Iceland) Akranes	H	1–1	Strachan	12,500
R2 L1	19 October	(Belgium) Beveren	A	0–0		21,000
R2 L2	2 November	(Belgium) Beveren	H	4–1	Simpson, Strachan (2), Weir	22,500
QF L1	7 March	(Hungary) Újpest Dozsa	A	0–2		29,000
QF L2	21 March	(Hungary) Újpest Dozsa	H	3–0	McGhee (3)	22,800
SF L1	11 April	(Portugal) Porto	A	0–1		65,000
SF L2	25 April	(Portugal) Porto	H	0–1		23,000

=== European Super Cup ===
After winning the UEFA Cup Winners' Cup in the previous season, Aberdeen qualified to play the European Champions' Cup winners from 1983, Hamburger SV, in the Super Cup. Aberdeen won the game 2–0 on aggregate.

Round	Date	Opponent	H/A	Score	Aberdeen Scorer(s)	Attendance
L1	22 November	(West Germany) Hamburger SV	A	0–0		15,000
L2	20 December	(West Germany) Hamburger SV	H	2–0	Simpson, McGhee	22,500

== Squad ==
=== Appearances & Goals ===
No.	Pos	Nat	Player	Total		Premier Division		Scottish Cup		League Cup		Europe	
No.	Pos	Nat	Player	Apps	Goals	Apps	Goals	Apps	Goals	Apps	Goals	Apps	Goals
	GK	(Scotland) SCO	Jim Leighton	63	0	36	0	7	0	10	0	10	0
	DF	(Scotland) SCO	Tommy McIntyre	12	0	9	0	0	0	3	0	0	0
	DF	(Scotland) SCO	Stewart McKimmie	29	1	18	1	6	0	0	0	5	0
	DF	(Scotland) SCO	Alex McLeish	59	2	32	2	7	0	10	0	10	0
	DF	(Scotland) SCO	Willie Miller (c)	60	4	34	2	7	1	9	1	10	0
	DF	(Scotland) SCO	Brian Mitchell	15	0	10	0	2	0	1	0	2	0
	DF	(Scotland) SCO	Doug Rougvie	56	4	34	4	7	0	8	0	7	0
	DF	(Scotland) SCO	Ian Robertson	1	0	1	0	0	0	0	0	0	0
	MF	(Scotland) SCO	Ian Angus	23	1	11	0	5	1	4	0	3	0
	MF	(Scotland) SCO	Doug Bell	43	4	23	3	2	0	8	1	10	0
	MF	(Scotland) SCO	Neale Cooper	48	1	26	0	5	1	8	0	9	0
	MF	(Scotland) SCO	John McMaster	26	0	13	0	2	0	7	0	4	0
	MF	(Scotland) SCO	Ian Porteous	22	6	14	3	4	1	3	2	1	0
	MF	(Scotland) SCO	Neil Simpson	45	5	24	2	4	0	7	1	10	2
	MF	(Scotland) SCO	Billy Stark	23	11	14	6	1	0	5	5	3	0
	MF	(Scotland) SCO	Gordon Strachan	47	18	25	13	7	2	6	0	9	3
	MF	(Scotland) SCO	Peter Weir	44	8	27	5	4	2	8	0	5	1
	FW	(Scotland) SCO	Eric Black	37	12	18	6	7	1	6	5	6	0
	FW	(Scotland) SCO	Steve Cowan	7	0	5	0	1	0	1	0	0	0
	FW	(Scotland) SCO	Willie Falconer	15	2	9	2	0	0	5	0	1	0
	FW	(Scotland) SCO	John Hewitt	58	16	33	12	5	0	10	4	10	0
	FW	(Scotland) SCO	Mark McGhee	55	24	33	13	6	2	6	3	10	6
	FW	(Scotland) SCO	Paul Wright	1	0	1	0	0	0	0	0	0	0
