= Eric Black =

Scottish footballer (born 1963)

Personal information
- Full name: John Eric Black
- Date of birth: 1 October 1963 (age 63)
- Place of birth: Bellshill, Scotland
- Height: 5 ft 8 in (1.73 m)
- Position: Striker

Youth career
- 1980–1981: Aberdeen

Senior career*
Years	Team	Apps	(Gls)
1981–1986	Aberdeen	115	(45)
1986–1991	Metz	86	(26)
Total		201	(71)

International career
1982–1985	Scotland U21	8	(2)
1987	Scotland	2	(0)

Managerial career
- 2001–2002: Motherwell
- 2003–2004: Coventry City
- 2007: Birmingham City (caretaker)
- 2011: Sunderland (caretaker)
- 2012: Blackburn Rovers (caretaker)
- 2015: Rotherham United (caretaker)
- 2016: Aston Villa (caretaker)
- * Club domestic league appearances and goals

John Eric Black (born 1 October 1963) is a Scottish former professional football player and coach. Black played as a striker for Aberdeen and Metz, winning major trophies with both clubs, and earned two international caps for the Scotland national team. He was forced to retire from playing at a relatively early age and became a coach, working as a manager at Motherwell and Coventry City.

== Playing career ==
Born in Bellshill, Lanarkshire, Black spent his early life in the Glasgow area before his family moved north to Nigg, Highland due to his father's job in the offshore oil industry, and he signed for Aberdeen in 1980 (a week after Bryan Gunn who came from the same part of the country). He won the Scottish 2nd XI Cup with the reserves. Black was heavily involved in the most successful era of Aberdeen's history under the management of Alex Ferguson, the pinnacle being their victory in the European Cup Winners' Cup in 1983 with a 2–1 win over Real Madrid, in which the then 19-year-old Black scored the first goal. Black's main assets were his strength in the air (despite not being particularly tall) and goalscoring instincts. In February 1983, Black scored a hat-trick in a 3–1 win against Celtic, as of 2020 still the last visiting player to score three at Celtic Park. He made 180 appearances (30 as substitute) in all competitions for Aberdeen and scored 70 goals between 1981 and 1986, winning two Scottish Football League titles, three Scottish Cups and a Scottish League Cup as well the Cup Winners' Cup and the European Super Cup in 1983. He missed out on a potential fourth Scottish Cup medal when he was overlooked for the 1986 final having already agreed to move abroad.

In summer 1986, Black joined Metz in France. He had initially agreed a deal in principle with Arsène Wenger to join Monaco, but this fell through when Wenger was not released from his previous club contract at that time as had been anticipated. After five seasons (1986 to 1991) with Metz, during which he won the Summer Cup (forerunner of the League Cup) within weeks of arriving in 1986 and the French Cup in 1988 (and off the field became a father to two children), Black was forced to retire from the game aged 27 due to a chronic back problem. Alex Ferguson later admitted that injury problems suffered by Black and other young players he had managed at Aberdeen were due to them playing an excessive number of games at a young age. In all, Black made 95 appearances for Metz, scoring 34 goals.

== Coaching career ==
Black was a coach and assistant manager at Celtic, leaving the club when head coach John Barnes was sacked in February 2000. Black was appointed manager of Motherwell in October 2001. He was appointed Coventry City manager in January 2004, following the resignation of Gary McAllister. Black was sacked by Coventry for "being inconsistent", despite a 5–2 win against Gillingham. and 6-1 away to Walsall. This angered many fans who believed that Black had brought an attractive and highly effective style of football back to the club and was merely being moved on for a bigger name (he was succeeded by Peter Reid, who proved to be a major disappointment).

Black joined Birmingham City in July 2004 as assistant manager to Steve Bruce. He managed one game as caretaker manager, after Bruce joined Wigan Athletic, before leaving St Andrew's in November 2007. He was assistant manager to Bruce at Sunderland from June 2009 and was appointed caretaker manager following the departure of Bruce. In his only game in charge, Sunderland were beaten 2–1 by Wolverhampton Wanderers. Black left Sunderland on 6 December 2011.

Black was appointed assistant manager to Steve Kean at Blackburn Rovers in January 2012. He was caretaker manager at Blackburn after the departure of Kean.

Black was an advisor at Blackpool to caretaker manager Barry Ferguson in 2014. Black was appointed as a coach at Wigan in July 2014.

In July 2015, Black was named as first team coach of Championship side Rotherham United. Black was appointed caretaker manager of Rotherham in September 2015, after manager Steve Evans left the club. Black left Rotherham in January 2016 and was then appointed first team coach at Aston Villa. He was appointed Villa manager on a temporary basis after Rémi Garde left by mutual consent in March 2016. Black left Villa in June 2016 following the appointment of Roberto Di Matteo.

Black joined Southampton on 30 June 2016, as assistant manager to Claude Puel. On 29 September, The Daily Telegraph alleged that Black had offered advice to a third-party player ownership consortium on how to bribe lower league clubs. An investigation by Southampton FC cleared Black of any wrongdoing, as the newspaper refused to provide any evidence to substantiate their allegation. He resigned in December 2017 for personal reasons, with the club citing ongoing back problems due to injuries sustained during his playing career. 18 months after leaving that post, he confirmed he no longer wished to be involved in professional coaching and was happy to have left the intense football environment after nearly four decades.

== Playing statistics ==
=== Club ===
Appearances and goals by club, season and competition
Club	Season	League			National cup (Note: Includes Scottish Cup, Coupe de France)		League cup (Note: Includes Scottish League Cup)		Europe		Other		Total	
Club	Season	Division	Apps	Goals	Apps	Goals	Apps	Goals	Apps	Goals	Apps	Goals	Apps	Goals
Aberdeen	1980–81	Scottish Premier Division	0	0	0	0	0	0	0	0	–		0	0
Aberdeen	1981–82	Scottish Premier Division	13	3	2	0	0	0	2 (Note: Appearances in UEFA Cup)	1	–		17	4
Aberdeen	1982–83	Scottish Premier Division	31	12	5	1	8	3	8 (Note: Appearances in UEFA Cup Winners' Cup)	3	–		52	19
Aberdeen	1983–84	Scottish Premier Division	18	6	7	1	6	5	6	0	1 (Note: Appearance in European Super Cup)	0	38	12
Aberdeen	1984–85	Scottish Premier Division	27	16	6	1	0	0	2 (Note: Appearances in European Cup)	2	–		35	19
Aberdeen	1985–86	Scottish Premier Division	26	8	5	2	4	4	4	1	–		39	15
Aberdeen	Total		115	45	25	5	18	12	22	7	1	0	181	69
FC Metz	1986–87	French Division 1	19	10	0	0	0	6	–		–		19+	16
FC Metz	1987–88	French Division 1	28	8	7	1	–		–		–		35	9
FC Metz	1988–89	French Division 1	12	2	1	0	–		–		–		13	2
FC Metz	1989–90	French Division 1	23	6	1	1	–		–		–		24	7
FC Metz	1990–91	French Division 1	4	0	0	0	–		–		–		4	0
FC Metz	Total		86	26	9	2	0	6	–		–		95+	34
Career total			201	71	34	7	18+	18	22	7	1	0	276+	103

=== International ===
Appearances and goals by national team and year
National team	Year	Apps	Goals
Scotland	1987	2	0
Total		2	0

== Managerial statistics ==
As of 2 June 2016

Managerial record by team and tenure
Team	From	To	Record					Ref
Team	From	To	P	W	D	L	Win %	Ref
Motherwell	16 October 2001	24 April 2002	27	7	4	16	25.9	
Coventry City	11 December 2003	3 May 2004	26	12	4	10	46.2	
Birmingham City (caretaker)	23 November 2007	27 November 2007	1	0	0	1	0.0	
Sunderland (caretaker)	30 November 2011	5 December 2011	1	0	0	1	0.0	
Blackburn Rovers (caretaker)	28 September 2012	31 October 2012	6	2	3	1	33.3	
Rotherham United (caretaker)	28 September 2015	9 October 2015	1	0	0	1	0.0	
Aston Villa (caretaker)	29 March 2016	2 June 2016	7	0	1	6	0.0	
Total			69	21	12	36	30.4	—

== Honours ==
Aberdeen

- Scottish Premier Division: 1983–84, 1984–85
- Scottish Cup: 1981–82, 1982–83, 1983–84
- Scottish League Cup: 1985–86
- European Cup Winners' Cup: 1982–83
- European Super Cup: 1983

Metz

- Coupe de la Ligue: 1985–86
- Coupe de France: 1987–88

Southampton

- EFL Cup runner-up: 2016–17 (assistant manager; received medal at club annual awards evening)
