= 1985–86 Scottish League Cup =

Tournament details
- Country: Scotland

Final positions
- Champions: Aberdeen
- Runners-up: Hibernian

The 1985–86 Scottish League Cup was the fortieth season of Scotland's second football knockout competition. The competition was won by Aberdeen, who defeated Hibernian in the Final.

== First round ==
Home team	Score	Away team	Date
Berwick Rangers (3)	1–3	Cowdenbeath (3)	14 August 1985
Dunfermline Ath (3)	4–0	Stenhousemuir (3)	19 August 1985
East Stirlingshire (3)	1–3	Raith Rovers (3)	14 August 1985
Queen of the South (3)	3–0	Arbroath (3)	14 August 1985
Queen's Park (3)	1–2	Stirling Albion (3)	14 August 1985
Stranraer (3)	3–0	Albion Rovers (3)	14 August 1985

== Second round ==
Home team	Score	Away team	Date
Aberdeen	5–0	Ayr United	21 August 1985
Alloa Athletic	0–2	Dundee United	21 August 1985
Brechin City	3–1	Falkirk	21 August 1985
Clydebank	7–2	Raith Rovers	21 August 1985
Hamilton Academical	2–0	East Fife	20 August 1985
Hibernian	6–0	Cowdenbeath	21 August 1985
Meadowbank Thistle	2–3	Forfar Athletic	20 August 1985
Montrose	1–3	Heart of Midlothian	20 August 1985
Morton	2–2	Dunfermline Ath	21 August 1985
Motherwell	1–0	Partick Thistle	21 August 1985
Queen of the South	1–4	Celtic	21 August 1985
Rangers	5–0	Clyde	21 August 1985
St Johnstone	1–0	Airdrieonians	21 August 1985
St Mirren	3–1	Kilmarnock	20 August 1985
Stirling Albion	1–1	Dumbarton	21 August 1985
Stranraer	2–3	Dundee	21 August 1985

== Third round ==
Home team	Score	Away team	Date
Celtic	7–0	Brechin City	28 August 1985
Dundee United	2–0	Clydebank	28 August 1985
Forfar Athletic	2–2	Rangers	27 August 1985
Hamilton Academical	2–1	Dundee	28 August 1985
Heart of Midlothian	2–1	Stirling Albion	27 August 1985
Hibernian	6–1	Motherwell	28 August 1985
Morton	1–4	St Mirren	28 August 1985
St Johnstone	0–2	Aberdeen	28 August 1985

== Quarter-finals ==
Home team	Score	Away team	Date
Aberdeen	1–0	Heart of Midlothian	4 September 1985
Dundee United	2–1	St Mirren	4 September 1985
Hamilton Academical	1–2	Rangers	4 September 1985
Hibernian	4–4	Celtic	4 September 1985

== Semi-finals ==
=== First leg ===
Home team	Score	Away team	Date
Dundee United	0–1	Aberdeen	25 September 1985
Hibernian	2–0	Rangers	25 September 1985

=== Second leg ===
Home team	Score	Away team	Date	Agg
Aberdeen	1–0	Dundee United	9 October 1985	2–0
Rangers	1–0	Hibernian	9 October 1985	1–2

== Final ==
27 October 1985

Aberdeen	3–0	Hibernian
Black 10'; Stark 12'; Black 63'

Hampden Park, Glasgow
Attendance: 40,061
