= Tommy McQueen =

Scottish footballer

Personal information
- Full name: Thomas Feeney McQueen
- Date of birth: 1 April 1963 (age 63)
- Place of birth: Bellshill, Scotland
- Height: 5 ft 7 in (1.70 m)
- Position: Defender

Youth career
- Gartcosh United

Senior career*
Years	Team	Apps	(Gls)
1981–1984	Clyde	99	(14)
1984–1987	Aberdeen	53	(4)
1987–1990	West Ham United	30	(0)
1990–1995	Falkirk	118	(7)
1995–1997	Dundee	37	(0)
Total		337	(25)
- * Club domestic league appearances and goals

Thomas Feeney McQueen (born 1 April 1963) is a Scottish former footballer who played as a defender. His primary position was full back.

McQueen began his career with Clyde, making over 100 appearances in all competitions, before moving to Aberdeen in 1984, where he made a total of 65 appearances, scored five goals and was part of the 1986 Scottish Cup winning team. He left Scotland in 1987 to play for West Ham United, but returned in 1990 to play for Falkirk, followed by Dundee in 1994.

McQueen was the only footballer to win medals in all three divisions in the 1975–1994 three-division structure of the SFL (with Clyde, Falkirk and Aberdeen).

As of August 2015, McQueen was co-owner of a haulage firm in Glasgow with former Falkirk player Roddy Manley.

== Honours ==
Clyde

- Scottish Second Division: 1981–82

Aberdeen

- Scottish Premier Division: 1984–85
- Scottish Cup: 1985–86

Falkirk

- Scottish First Division: 1990–91, 1993–94
- Scottish Challenge Cup: 1993–94
