= Frank McDougall =

Scottish footballer (1958–2023)

Personal information
- Full name: Douglas Francis McDougall
- Date of birth: 21 February 1958
- Place of birth: Glasgow, Scotland
- Date of death: 1 October 2023 (aged 65)
- Position: Striker

Youth career
- Heart of Midlothian

Senior career*
Years	Team	Apps	(Gls)
1975–1976	Duntocher Hibernian		
1976–1978	Glasgow Perthshire		
1978–1979	Clydebank	38	(25)
1979–1984	St Mirren	115	(43)
1984–1987	Aberdeen	54	(36)
Total		207	(104)
- * Club domestic league appearances and goals

Douglas Francis McDougall (21 February 1958 – 1 October 2023) was a Scottish professional footballer who played as a striker for Clydebank, St Mirren and Aberdeen in the 1970s and 1980s.

== Playing career ==
=== Early career ===
McDougall was brought up in the Cadder neighbourhood of Glasgow and, in his teens, showed promise as a boxer. His first involvement in professional football came after Hearts manager Bobby Seith saw him in a local amateur game and signed him on a schoolboy form for the Edinburgh club.

McDougall's progress at Hearts was interrupted after an incident on a bus left him hospitalised for six months while his damaged eyesight was repaired. He later dropped to Junior level with Duntocher Hibs and Glasgow Perthshire, and despite an unsuccessful trial with Partick Thistle, signed for Clydebank in 1978.

After scoring 28 goals in the 1978–79 season for Clydebank, he was bought by St Mirren for £150,000. This was a record transfer between two Scottish clubs at the time.

=== Aberdeen ===
Aberdeen signed McDougall in 1984 from St Mirren for a transfer fee of £100,000. His 22 league goals (24 in all competitions) in his first season made him the top scorer in the Scottish Premier Division, and helped The Dons win the league championship. McDougall scored a hat-trick as Aberdeen clinched the championship with a 3–0 win at Hearts on 4 May 1985. His second season saw fewer goals, but did include a four-goal haul in a 4–1 win over Celtic on 2 November 1985. At Aberdeen, McDougall was troubled by a persistent back injury, diagnosed as traumatic spondylitis, and played his last game for Aberdeen in August 1986 against Hibernian. Six months later, as his condition did not improve, he was forced to retire on medical advice around the time of his 29th birthday.

== Personal life and death ==
McDougall lived in England for a few years with his Brazilian wife before moving to Brazil, although he later returned to England.

While running his pub in Bury, Greater Manchester, he played a season with Clitheroe FC. He died on 1 October 2023, at the age of 65.

== Career statistics ==
=== Club ===
Appearances and goals by club, season and competition
Club	Season	League			Scottish cup		League cup		Europe		Total	
Club	Season	Division	Apps	Goals	Apps	Goals	Apps	Goals	Apps	Goals	Apps	Goals
Clydebank	1978-79	Scottish First Division	38	25	3	2	4	1			45	28
St Mirren	1979–80	Scottish Premier Division										
St Mirren	1980–81	Scottish Premier Division										
St Mirren	1981–82	Scottish Premier Division										
St Mirren	1982–83	Scottish Premier Division										
St Mirren	1983–84	Scottish Premier Division										
St Mirren	Total		115	43							169	64
Aberdeen	1984–85	Scottish Premier Division	28	22	2	2	0	0	0	0	30	24
Aberdeen	1985–86	Scottish Premier Division	25	14	4	1	6	4	3	1	38	20
Aberdeen	1986–87	Scottish Premier Division	1	0	0	0	0	0	0	0	1	0
Aberdeen	Total		54	36	6	3	6	4	3	1	69	44
Career total			207	104	9+	5+	10+	5+	3+	1+	283	136
