= Stevie Gray =

Scottish footballer

Personal information
- Date of birth: 7 February 1967
- Place of birth: Glasgow, Scotland
- Date of death: 19 September 2009 (aged 42)
- Place of death: Irvine, Scotland
- Position: Right winger

Youth career
- 1983–1985: Aberdeen

Senior career*
Years	Team	Apps	(Gls)
1985–1990	Aberdeen	37	(2)
1989–1993	Airdrieonians	48	(10)
1993–1998	Huntly		
Total		85	(12)

International career
1986	Scotland U21	1	(0)
- * Club domestic league appearances and goals

Stephen Gray (7 February 1967 – 19 September 2009) was a Scottish professional footballer who played as a right winger. Gray made 85 appearances in the Scottish Football League for Aberdeen and Airdrieonians between 1985 and 1993. Gray also represented Scotland at under-21 international level.

== Career ==
Born in Glasgow, Gray won the Scottish Youth Cup with Aberdeen in 1985, and then broke into the first team managed by Alex Ferguson, winning the 1985 Scottish League Cup Final. He left Aberdeen in 1989 to join second-tier Airdrie for a fee of £70,000, where he was part of the team managed by Jimmy Bone which achieved promotion to the Premier Division in 1991, but he dropped out of the senior game in 1993 to sign for Highland League team Huntly.

== Death ==
Gray died on 19 September 2009 in Irvine, aged 42. After Gray's death, former teammate Stewart McKimmie commented that Gray had perhaps lost his way after Ferguson left Aberdeen in 1986.

== Honours ==
- Airdrieonians Hall of Fame
