= Ian Porteous =

Scottish footballer

Personal information
- Date of birth: 21 November 1964 (age 61)
- Place of birth: Scotland
- Position: Right wing

Senior career*
Years	Team	Apps	(Gls)
1982–1988	Aberdeen	46	(7)
1988–1989	Herfølge Boldklub		
1989–1994	Kilmarnock	64	(9)
1994–1995	Elgin City		
1995–1996	Arbroath	30	(8)
- * Club domestic league appearances and goals as of 13 July 2008

Ian Porteous (born 21 November 1964) is a Scottish former footballer.

He played for Aberdeen before moving to Denmark to play for Herfølge Boldklub. He later returned to Scotland to play for Kilmarnock.

Born in the Castlemilk area of Glasgow
