= Billy Stark =

Scottish footballer & coach (born 1956)

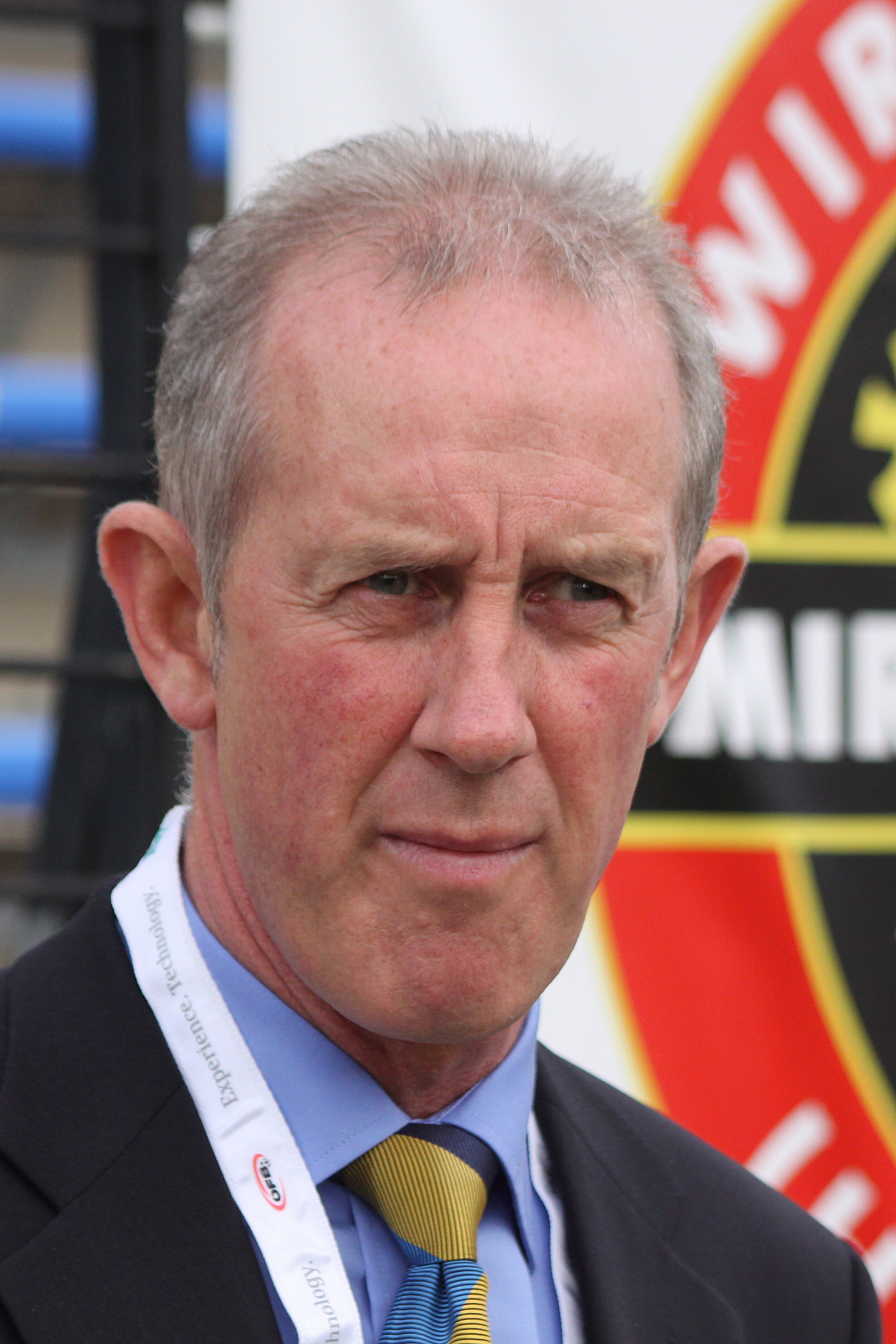
- Stark as Scotland under-21 head coach, in 2009

Personal information
- Full name: William Stark
- Date of birth: 1 December 1956 (age 69)
- Place of birth: Glasgow, Scotland
- Position: Midfielder

Senior career*
Years	Team	Apps	(Gls)
1975–1983	St Mirren	255	(60)
1983–1987	Aberdeen	112	(41)
1987–1990	Celtic	64	(17)
1990–1992	Kilmarnock	22	(6)
1992–1993	Hamilton Academical	14	(0)
1993–1994	Kilmarnock	36	(3)
Total		503	(127)

International career
1985	Scotland U21	1	(0)

Managerial career
- 1997: Celtic (caretaker)
- 1997–2000: Greenock Morton
- 2001–2004: St Johnstone
- 2004–2008: Queen's Park
- 2008–2014: Scotland U21
- 2012–2013: Scotland (caretaker)
- 2017–2018: East Kilbride
- 2018–2024: Scotland U19
- * Club domestic league appearances and goals

William Stark (born 1 December 1956) is a Scottish former football player and coach. He made 500 league appearances in total, including successful spells at St Mirren, Aberdeen and Celtic. He then turned to management, which has seen him take caretaker charge of both Celtic and Scotland - staying unbeaten at manager of both teams in his short spells - with longer roles at smaller club sides in Scotland.

== Playing career ==
Born in Glasgow, Stark made his professional debut in 1975 in nearby Paisley for St Mirren. Two years later he won his first honour, a First Division winners medal. After 255 games for St Mirren, scoring 60 goals, he was signed by Aberdeen for £80,000. During a period of success for the side, he helped Aberdeen to win a European Super Cup in 1983, a Premier Division and Scottish Cup double in 1984, another league title the following year and a League Cup and Scottish Cup double in 1986.

Stark was signed by Celtic in 1987, for a £100,000 transfer fee. In three seasons with the club he won two further Scottish Cups and a League Championship, before leaving for Kilmarnock for two seasons. In 1992, he transferred to Hamilton Academical as a player/coach, but returned to Kilmarnock the following year under manager and former Celtic colleague Tommy Burns. Stark retired from playing in 1994, having scored over 100 league goals.

== Coaching career ==
After retiring as a player, Stark became assistant to Tommy Burns at Celtic. When Burns left Celtic in 1997, Stark managed the side for three matches in a caretaker capacity before leaving himself. Stark then had spells managing Greenock Morton and St Johnstone before becoming Queen's Park manager in 2004.

Stark led Queen's to one of their greatest results of modern times in August 2006 at Firhill Stadium, when Queen's Park beat his former club Aberdeen on penalty kicks after a 0–0 draw in the 2006–07 Scottish League Cup. Stark also led the Glasgow club to promotion from the Scottish Third Division and later hailed the achievement as the highlight of his football career.

Stark left Queen's Park on 1 January 2008 to work for the Scottish Football Association, a role that involved managing the under-21 national team. They reached the qualification playoffs for the 2011 European championship, but they lost out to Iceland. David Goodwillie, Danny Wilson and Barry Bannan were promoted from the under-21s to the full national team selected by Craig Levein in November 2010. The team finished in second place in their qualifying group for the 2013 European championship, but did not gather enough points to be eligible for the playoffs.

Stark was placed in caretaker charge of the Scotland national team for a friendly against Luxembourg in November 2012, following the departure of Craig Levein. Stark resigned from the position of Scotland under-21 manager in November 2014.

In June 2015, Stark was appointed assistant manager to Darren Young at newly promoted Scottish League One side Albion Rovers.

In June 2017, he was appointed manager at Scottish Lowland Football League side East Kilbride. He resigned from this position shortly before the end of the 2017–18 season. Stark then returned to the Scottish Football Association, within this role he became head coach of the under-19 national team.

Stark retired from coaching in April 2024.

== Career statistics ==
=== Club ===
Appearances and goals by club, season and competition
Club	Seasons	League			Scottish Cup		League Cup		Europe		Total	
Club	Seasons	Division	Apps	Goals	Apps	Goals	Apps	Goals	Apps	Goals	Apps	Goals
St Mirren	1975–76	Scottish First Division			-	-	-	-	-	-		
St Mirren	1976–77	Scottish First Division			-	-	-	-	-	-		
St Mirren	1977–78	Scottish Premier Division			-	-	-	-	-	-		
St Mirren	1978–79	Scottish Premier Division			-	-	-	-	-	-		
St Mirren	1979–80	Scottish Premier Division			-	-	-	-	-	-		
St Mirren	1980–81	Scottish Premier Division			-	-	-	-	-	-		
St Mirren	1981–82	Scottish Premier Division			-	-	-	-	-	-		
St Mirren	1982–83	Scottish Premier Division			-	-	-	-	-	-		
St Mirren	Total		255	60	-	-	-	-	-	-	345	84
Aberdeen	1983–84	Scottish Premier Division	14	6	1	0	5	5	2	0	22	11
Aberdeen	1984–85	Scottish Premier Division	32	15	5	4	1	1	2	0	40	20
Aberdeen	1985–86	Scottish Premier Division	30	8	5	3	6	3	5	1	46	15
Aberdeen	1986–87	Scottish Premier Division	36	12	1	0	2	2	2	0	41	14
Aberdeen	Total		112	41	12	7	14	11	11	1	149	60
Celtic	1987–88	Scottish Premier Division	37	8	5	2	3	3	2	0	47	13
Celtic	1988–89	Scottish Premier Division	25	9	4	1	2	1	3	1	34	12
Celtic	1989–90	Scottish Premier Division	2	0	1	0	0	0	0	0	3	0
Celtic	Total		64	17	10	3	5	4	5	1	84	25
Kilmarnock	1990–91	Scottish First Division	21	6	0	0	2	1	-	-	23	7
Kilmarnock	1991–92	Scottish First Division	1	0	0	0	0	0	-	-	1	0
Kilmarnock	Total		22	6	0	0	2	1	-	-	24	7
Hamilton Academical	1991–92	Scottish First Division	14	0	-	-	-	-	-	-	14+	0+
Kilmarnock	1992–93	Scottish First Division	28	3	3	0	0	0	-	-	31	3
Kilmarnock	1993–94	Scottish Premier Division	8	0	0	0	0	0	0	0	8	0
Kilmarnock	Total		36	3	3	0	0	0	0	0	39	3
Career total			503	127	25+	10+	21+	16+	16	2	565+	155+

=== Managerial record ===
Team	From	To	Record				
Team	From	To	P	W	L	D	Win %
Celtic (caretaker)	1997	1997	3	2	0	1	66.67%
Greenock Morton	1997	2000	95	31	42	22	32.63%
St Johnstone	2001	2004	115	47	45	23	40.87%
Queen's Park	2004	2008	149	63	53	33	42.28%
Scotland U21	2008	2014	45	17	16	12	37.78%
Scotland (caretaker)	2012	2012	1	1	0	0	100%
East Kilbride	2017	2018	-	-	-	-	-
Scotland U19	2018	2024	-	-	-	-	-
Total			408+	161+	156+	91+	53.37%
