= 1980–81 Aberdeen F.C. season =

Aberdeen
1980–81 season
- Chairman: Dick Donald
- Manager: Alex Ferguson
- Scottish Premier Division: 2nd
- Scottish Cup: 4th round
- Scottish League Cup: Quarter-final
- European Cup: 2nd round
- Drybrough Cup: Winners
- Top goalscorer: League: Mark McGhee (13); All: Mark McGhee (17)
- Highest home attendance: 24,000 vs. Celtic, 27 December 1980; 24,000 vs. Liverpool, 22 October 1980
- Lowest home attendance: 5,600 vs. Heart of Midlothian, 11 April 1981
- Average home league attendance: 12,812

Aberdeen competed in the Scottish Premier Division, Scottish Cup, League Cup and European Cup in season 1980–81.

== Overview ==
Aberdeen finished second in the Scottish Premier Division. The team played in their first-ever European Champions' Cup campaign, defeating Austrian Champions Austria Memphis, then losing 0–5 on aggregate to English club Liverpool. In the domestic cups, they lost in the quarter final of the League Cup to Dundee and were knocked out of the Scottish Cup in the fourth round by Morton.

== Results ==
=== Friendlies ===
Date	Opponent	H/A	Score	Aberdeen Scorer(s)	Attendance
19 July	(Faroe Islands) B36 Tórshavn	A	5–1	Scanlon (2), Jarvie, Watson, McMaster	0
22 July	Forres Mechanics	A	7–1	Jarvie (3), Scanlon, Watson, McMaster, Cowan	0
23 July	Nairn County	A	5–0	Scanlon (3), Strachan, Jarvie	0
3 August	(England) Arsenal	H	2–1	Watson, Miller	0
12 August	(Netherlands) FC Twente	H	1–2	McLeish	0
31 August	Joe Harper Select	H	8–6	Cowan (2), Strachan, Leighton, Jarvie, Perovic, Dornan, Davidson	0
3 May	Dundee	A	3–0	Rougvie, Harrow, Davidson	0

=== Scottish Premier Division ===
Match Day	Date	Opponent	H/A	Score	Aberdeen Scorer(s)	Attendance
1.	9 August	St Mirren	A	1–0	Jarvie	7,067
2.	16 August	Dundee United	H	1–1	Strachan	13,729
3.	23 August	Airdrieonians	A	4–0	Cowan, McGhee, Jarvie, Scanlon	5,000
4.	6 September	Morton	H	6–0	Miller, Strachan, McMaster, Scanlon (2), Hewitt	9,485
5.	13 September	Rangers	A	1–1	Strachan	30,000
6.	20 September	Partick Thistle	A	1–0	McGhee	6,000
7.	27 September	Celtic	H	2–2	McGhee, McAdam (Own goal)	23,000
8.	4 October	Heart of Midlothian	A	1–0	Rougvie	10,873
9.	11 October	Kilmarnock	H	2–0	Jarvie, Scanlon	11,000
10.	18 October	St Mirren	H	3–2	McMaster, McGhee (2)	11,000
11.	25 October	Dundee United	A	3–1	McGhee, Strachan, Hewitt	10,043
12.	1 November	Airdrieonians	H	4–1	McCall (3), McGhee	9,000
13.	8 November	Celtic	A	2–0	McCall (2)	29,000
14.	15 November	Partick Thistle	H	2–1	Strachan, Bell	12,000
15.	22 November	Kilmarnock	A	1–1	McLeish	3,200
16.	6 December	Morton	A	0–1		5,000
17.	13 December	Rangers	H	2–0	McGhee, Johnstone (Own goal)	22,500
18.	20 December	Partick Thistle	A	1–1	McCall	4,000
19.	27 December	Celtic	H	4–1	McCall, McLeish, Miller, Strachan	24,000
20.	30 December	Dundee United	H	1–1	Scanlon	23,000
21.	3 January	St Mirren	A	1–1	Scanlon	11,100
22.	10 January	Heart of Midlothian	A	2–0	McCall, McGhee	7,999
23.	31 January	Rangers	A	0–1		32,500
24.	7 February	Morton	H	0–1		11,000
25.	21 February	Airdrieonians	A	0–0		2,600
26.	28 February	St Mirren	H	1–2	Jarvie	9,500
27.	7 March	Heart of Midlothian	H	4–1	Hamilton, Angus, McCall, Jarvie	9,500
28.	14 March	Kilmarnock	A	0–1		2,400
29.	28 March	Celtic	A	1–1	Harrow	35,200
30.	1 April	Partick Thistle	H	3–1	McLeish, Simpson, McGhee	8,000
31.	4 April	Morton	A	3–1	Simpson, McGhee, Rougvie	4,500
32.	11 April	Heart of Midlothian	H	1–0	Rougvie	5,600
33.	18 April	Airdrieonians	H	3–0	McCall, McGhee (2)	7,000
34.	22 April	Rangers	H	0–0		15,000
35.	25 April	Dundee United	A	0–0		6,369
36.	2 May	Kilmarnock	H	0–2		6,300

==== Final standings ====
Pos	Team	Pld	W	D	L	GF	GA	GD	Pts	Qualification or relegation
1	Celtic (C)	36	26	4	6	84	37	+47	56	Qualification for the European Cup first round
2	Aberdeen	36	19	11	6	61	26	+35	49	Qualification for the UEFA Cup first round
3	Rangers	36	16	12	8	60	32	+28	44	Qualification for the Cup Winners' Cup first round
4	St Mirren	36	18	8	10	56	47	+9	44	
5	Dundee United	36	17	9	10	66	42	+24	43	Qualification for the UEFA Cup first round

Source: Statto
Rules for classification: 1) points; 2) goal difference; 3) number of goals scored.
(C) Champions

=== Drybrough Cup ===
Round	Date	Opponent	H/A	Score	Aberdeen Scorer(s)	Attendance
QF	26 July	Airdrieonians	H	4–1	Scanlon (3), Watson (2)	0
SF	30 July	Morton	A	4–2	Scanlon (2), Strachan, McGhee	
Final	2 August	St Mirren	N	2–1	Jarvie, Cowan	8,000

=== Scottish League Cup ===
Round	Date	Opponent	H/A	Score	Aberdeen Scorer(s)	Attendance
R2 L1	27 August	Berwick Rangers	H	8–1	Watson (2), McGhee (3), Jarvie (2), Bell	7,570
R2 L2	30 August	Berwick Rangers	A	4–1	de Clerck, Kennedy, Strachan, Hewitt	1,188
R3 L1	3 September	Rangers	A	0–1		30,000
R3 L2	24 September	Rangers	H	3–1	Strachan (2), McMaster	23,926
QF L1	8 October	Dundee	A	0–0		10,500
QF L2	29 October	Dundee	H	0–1		14,060

=== Scottish Cup ===
Round	Date	Opponent	H/A	Score	Aberdeen Scorer(s)	Attendance
R3	24 January	Raith Rovers	A	2–1	Jarvie	10,000
R4	14 February	Morton	A	0–1		8,350

=== European Champions' Cup ===
Round	Date	Opponent	H/A	Score	Aberdeen Scorer(s)	Attendance
R1 L1	17 September	Austria Memphis	H	1–0	McGhee	20,000
R1 L2	1 October	Austria Memphis	A	0–0		37,000
R2 L1	22 October	(England) Liverpool	H	0–1		24,000
R2 L2	5 November	(England) Liverpool	A	0–4		36,182

== Squad ==
=== Appearances & Goals ===
No.	Pos	Nat	Player	Total		Premier Division		Scottish Cup		League Cup		Europe	
No.	Pos	Nat	Player	Apps	Goals	Apps	Goals	Apps	Goals	Apps	Goals	Apps	Goals
	GK	(Belgium) BEL	Marc de Clerck	2	1	1	0	1	1	0	0	0	0
	GK	(Scotland) SCO	Jim Leighton	46	0	35	0	2	0	5	0	4	0
	DF	(Scotland) SCO	Doug Considine	14	0	11	0	1	0	2	0	0	0
	DF	(Scotland) SCO	Willie Garner	4	0	2	0	0	0	1	0	1	0
	DF	(Scotland) SCO	Andy Harrow	11	1	10	1	1	0	0	0	0	0
	DF	(Scotland) SCO	Stuart Kennedy	41	1	31	0	1	0	6	1	3	0
	DF	(Scotland) SCO	Alex McLeish	43	3	33	3	2	0	5	0	3	0
	DF	(Scotland) SCO	Willie Miller (c)	44	2	33	2	1	0	6	0	4	0
	DF	(Scotland) SCO	Doug Rougvie	38	3	27	3	1	0	6	0	4	0
	MF	(Scotland) SCO	Ian Angus	20	1	19	1	1	0	0	0	0	0
	MF	(Scotland) SCO	Dougie Bell	29	2	17	1	2	0	6	1	4	0
	MF	(Scotland) SCO	Neale Cooper	8	0	6	0	1	0	0	0	1	0
	MF	(Scotland) SCO	Steve Cowan	9	1	5	1	0	0	4	0	0	0
	MF	(Scotland) SCO	Duncan Davidson	6	0	4	0	1	0	1	0	0	0
	MF	(Scotland) SCO	Andy Dornan	3	0	2	0	0	0	0	0	1	0
	MF	(Scotland) SCO	Derek Hamilton	9	1	8	1	0	0	1	0	0	0
	MF	(Scotland) SCO	John McMaster	17	3	10	2	0	0	4	1	3	0
	MF	(Scotland) SCO	Steve Morrison	1	0	0	0	0	0	1	0	0	0
	MF	(Scotland) SCO	Ian Scanlon	45	6	35	6	1	0	5	0	4	0
	MF	(Scotland) SCO	Neil Simpson	16	2	16	2	0	0	0	0	0	0
	MF	(Scotland) SCO	Gordon Strachan	30	9	20	6	0	0	6	3	4	0
	MF	(Scotland) SCO	Andy Watson	42	2	30	0	2	0	6	2	4	0
	FW	(Scotland) SCO	Drew Jarvie	31	9	23	5	1	2	4	2	3	0
	FW	(Scotland) SCO	Walker McCall	21	10	19	10	2	0	0	0	0	0
	FW	(Scotland) SCO	Mark McGhee	47	17	36	13	2	0	5	3	4	1
	FW	(Scotland) SCO	Joe Harper	1	0	1	0	0	0	0	0	0	0
	FW	(Scotland) SCO	John Hewitt	28	3	21	2	1	0	3	1	3	0

=== Unofficial Appearances & Goals ===
No.	Pos	Nat	Player	Drybrough Cup	
No.	Pos	Nat	Player	Apps	Goals
	GK	(Scotland) SCO	Jim Leighton	3	0
	DF	(Scotland) SCO	Willie Miller (c)	3	0
	DF	(Scotland) SCO	Stuart Kennedy	3	0
	DF	(Scotland) SCO	Alex McLeish	3	0
	DF	(Scotland) SCO	Doug Rougvie	2	0
	MF	(Scotland) SCO	Ian Scanlon	3	5
	MF	(Scotland) SCO	Andy Watson	3	1
	MF	(Scotland) SCO	Gordon Strachan	3	1
	MF	(Scotland) SCO	John McMaster	3	0
	MF	(Scotland) SCO	Dougie Bell	2	0
	FW	(Scotland) SCO	Drew Jarvie	3	1
	FW	(Scotland) SCO	Steve Cowan	3	1
	FW	(Scotland) SCO	Mark McGhee	3	1
	FW	(Scotland) SCO	John Hewitt	2	0
