= 1979 Scottish League Cup final (December) =

1979–80 Scottish League Cup final
- Event: 1979–80 Scottish League Cup
Dundee United	Aberdeen

First match
Dundee United	Aberdeen
0	0
- Date: 8 December 1979
- Venue: Hampden Park, Glasgow
- Referee: Brian McGinlay (Balfron)
- Attendance: 27,173

Replay
Dundee United	Aberdeen
3	0
- Date: 12 December 1979
- Venue: Dens Park, Dundee
- Referee: Brian McGinlay (Balfron)
- Attendance: 28,933

The 1979–80 Scottish League Cup final was played on 8 December 1979 and replayed on 12 December 1979. It was the final of the 34th Scottish League Cup competition, and it was a New Firm derby contested by Dundee United and Aberdeen. The first match ended in a goalless draw, but Dundee United won the replay 3–0 thanks to goals by Willie Pettigrew (2) and Paul Sturrock.

United's victory earned them a place in the 1980–81 UEFA Cup competition.

== Match details ==
8 December 1979

Dundee United	0–0	Aberdeen
	Report (Page 19)

Hampden Park, Glasgow
Attendance: 27,173

DUNDEE UNITED:
GK	1	Hamish McAlpine
DF	2	Derek Stark
DF	3	Frank Kopel
MF	4	Iain Phillip	Substituted off
DF	5	Paul Hegarty (c)
DF	6	David Narey
MF	7	Eamonn Bannon
FW	8	Paul Sturrock
FW	9	Willie Pettigrew
MF	10	John Holt
MF	11	Graeme Payne		Substituted off
Substitutes:
MF	?	George Fleming	Substituted on
MF	?	Steve Murray		Substituted on
Manager:
Jim McLean

ABERDEEN:
GK	1	Bobby Clark
DF	2	Stuart Kennedy
DF	3	Doug Rougvie
DF	4	Alex McLeish
DF	5	Willie Garner
DF	6	Willie Miller (c)
MF	7	Gordon Strachan
FW	8	Steve Archibald
FW	9	Mark McGhee	Substituted off
MF	10	John McMaster		Substituted off
MF	11	Ian Scanlon
Substitutes:
DF	?	Derek Hamilton		Substituted on
FW	?	Drew Jarvie	Substituted on
Manager:
Alex Ferguson

Dundee United were delayed arriving at Hampden due to heavy traffic and flooding, and reached the stadium just 30 minutes before kick-off. Although both teams created chances, it was the two sides' defences that dominated the match. United's manager Jim McLean felt his side had not played at their best, but that Aberdeen had, and that gave him confidence for the replay.

=== Replay ===
12 December 1979
7:30pm

Dundee United	3–0	Aberdeen
Pettigrew 15' 65'; Sturrock 79'	Report

Dens Park, Dundee
Attendance: 28,984

DUNDEE UNITED:
GK	1	Hamish McAlpine
DF	2	Derek Stark
DF	3	Frank Kopel
MF	4	George Fleming
DF	5	Paul Hegarty (c)
DF	6	David Narey
MF	7	Eamonn Bannon
FW	8	Paul Sturrock
FW	9	Willie Pettigrew
MF	10	John Holt
MF	11	Billy Kirkwood
Substitutes:
?	?	Iain Phillip
?	?	Graeme Payne
Manager:
Jim McLean

ABERDEEN:
GK	1	Bobby Clark
DF	2	Stuart Kennedy
DF	3	Doug Rougvie
DF	4	Alex McLeish
DF	5	Willie Garner
DF	6	Willie Miller (c)
MF	7	Gordon Strachan
FW	8	Steve Archibald
FW	9	Mark McGhee	Substituted off
MF	10	John McMaster		Substituted off
MF	11	Ian Scanlon
Substitutes:
DF	?	Derek Hamilton		Substituted on
FW	?	Drew Jarvie	Substituted on
Manager:
Alex Ferguson

The replay in windy conditions at Dens Park saw a larger attendance than the original tie. This time Dundee United dominated the match to win 3-0 and secure their first ever major honour.
