= 1978–79 Aberdeen F.C. season =

Aberdeen
1978–79 season
- Chairman: Dick Donald
- Manager: Alex Ferguson
- Scottish Premier Division: 4th
- Scottish Cup: Semi-finalists
- Scottish League Cup: Runners-up
- European Cup Winners' Cup: Second round
- Top goalscorer: League: Joe Harper (19); All: Joe Harper (32)
- Highest home attendance: 24,500 vs. Rangers, 18 November 1978
- Lowest home attendance: 6,000 vs. Hearts, 2 May 1979
- Average home league attendance: 12,478

== Results ==
=== Scottish Premier Division ===
Match Day	Date	Opponent	H/A	Score	Aberdeen Scorer(s)	Attendance
1.	12 August	Heart of Midlothian	A	4–1	Archibald (2), Harper, Davidson	11,500
2.	19 August	Morton	H	3–1	Harper (3),	14,500
3.	26 August	Dundee United	A	1–1	Harper (2),	10,000
4.	9 September	Motherwell	H	4–0	Archibald (2), Harper (2),	12,200
5.	16 September	Rangers	A	1–1	Sullivan	27,000
6.	23 September	Hibernian	A	1–2	Jarvie	12,086
7.	30 September	Partick Thistle	H	1–1	Archibald	11,100
8.	7 October	Celtic	H	4–1	Archibald (2), Harper, Jarvie	24,000
9.	14 October	St Mirren	A	1–2	Harper	10,973
10.	21 October	Heart of Midlothian	H	1–2	Harper	12,750
11.	29 October	Morton	A	1–2	Jarvie	6,500
12.	5 November	Dundee United	H	1–0	Harper	13,850
13.	11 November	Motherwell	A	1–1	Scanlon	5,448
14.	18 November	Rangers	H	0–0		24,000
15.	25 November	Hibernian	A	4–1	Harper (2), Fleming, Sullivan	13,250
16.	9 December	Celtic	A	0–0		24,000
17.	16 December	St Mirren	H	1–1	McMaster	11,700
18.	23 December	Heart of Midlothian	A	0–0		9,500
19.	30 December	Morton	H	1–2	Harper	8,700
20.	20 January	Hibernian	A	1–1	Harper	4,100
21.	24 February	St Mirren	A	2–2	Archibald, Strachan	11,500
22.	28 February	Partick Thistle	H	2–1	Archibald, McMaster	11,500
23.	3 March	Celtic	A	0–1		26,000
24.	17 March	Dundee United	H	0–2		10,200
25.	26 March	Motherwell	H	8–0	Harper (2), Archibald (2), McMaster, Sullivan, Strachan, Davidson	6,300
26.	4 April	Morton	A	1–0	Cooper	6,500
27.	7 April	Hibernian	H	0–0		10,000
28.	14 April	Partick Thistle	A	1–0	McGhee	6,000
29.	18 April	Motherwell	A	1–1	McLeish	2,672
30.	21 April	Celtic	H	1–1	Strachan	18,400
31.	25 April	Rangers	H	2–1	Archibald, McGhee	19,000
32.	28 April	St Mirren	H	1–2	Archibald	10,400
33.	2 May	Heart of Midlothian	H	5–0	McGhee (2), Strachan, Scanlon, Sullivan	6,000
34.	5 May	Dundee United	A	2–2	Jarvie, Strachan	7,822
35.	7 May	Rangers	A	0–2		30,000
36.	11 May	Partick Thistle	A	2–1	Harper, Sullivan	4,000

==== Final standings ====
Pos	Team	Pld	W	D	L	GF	GA	GD	Pts	Qualification or relegation
2	Rangers	36	18	9	9	52	35	+17	45	Qualification for the Cup Winners' Cup first round
3	Dundee United	36	18	8	10	56	37	+19	44	Qualification for the UEFA Cup first round
4	Aberdeen	36	13	14	9	59	36	+23	40	Qualification for the UEFA Cup first round
5	Hibernian	36	12	13	11	44	48	−4	37	
6	St Mirren	36	15	6	15	45	41	+4	36	

Source: Statto and RSSSF
Rules for classification: 1) points; 2) goal difference; 3) number of goals scored.

==== Results by round ====
Round	1	2	3	4	5	6	7	8	9	10	11	12	13	14	15	16	17	18	19	20	21	22	23	24	25	26	27	28	29	30	31	32	33	34	35	36
Ground	A	H	A	H	A	A	H	H	A	H	A	H	A	H	A	A	H	A	H	A	A	H	A	H	H	A	H	A	A	H	H	H	H	A	A	A
Result	W	W	D	W	D	L	D	W	L	L	L	W	D	D	W	D	D	D	L	D	D	W	L	L	W	W	D	W	D	D	W	L	W	D	L	W
Position	1	1	2	2	2	3	3	3	4	4	5	2	3	3	2	3	3	3	3	3	4	2	2	4	4	5	5	3	5	4	3	4	4	4	4	4

Source: Statto.com
A = Away; H = Home; W = Win; D = Draw; L = Loss

=== Scottish League Cup ===
Round	Date	Opponent	H/A	Score	Aberdeen Scorer(s)	Attendance
R2 L1	30 August	Meadowbank Thistle	A	5–0	Sullivan, Jarvie, Kennedy, Archibald, Fleming	1,600
R2 L2	2 September	Meadowbank Thistle	H	4–0	Harper (2), Archibald, Scanlon	6,850
R3 L1	4 October	Hamilton Academical	A	1–0	Scanlon	5,000
R3 L2	11 October	Hamilton Academical	H	7–1	Harper (4), Rougvie, Sullivan, Kennedy	10,000
QF L1	8 November	Ayr United	A	3–3	Harper, Sullivan	6,300
QF L2	15 November	Ayr United	H	3–1	McLelland, Harper, Archibald	13,000
SF	13 December	Hibernian	N	1–0	Kennedy	21,048
F	31 March	Rangers	N	1–2	Davidson	54,000

=== Scottish Cup ===
Round	Date	Opponent	H/A	Score	Aberdeen Scorer(s)	Attendance
R3	27 January	Hamilton Academical	A	2–0	Miller, Harper	9,400
R4	21 February	Ayr United	H	6–2	Scanlon (2), McMaster, Archibald (2), Harper	11,500
QF	10 March	Celtic	H	1–1	Harper	23,000
QFR	14 March	Celtic	A	2–1	Davidson, Archibald	36,000
SF	11 April	Hibernian	N	1–2	Archibald	9,387

=== European Cup Winners' Cup ===
Round	Date	Opponent	H/A	Score	Aberdeen Scorer(s)	Attendance
R1 L1	13 September	(Bulgaria) Marek Dimitrov	A	2–3	Jarvie, Harper	20,000
R1 L2	27 September	(Bulgaria) Marek Dimitrov	H	3–0	Strachan, Jarvie, Harper	21,100
R2 L1	18 October	(West Germany) Fortuna Düsseldorf	A	0–3		10,000
R2 L2	1 November	(West Germany) Fortuna Düsseldorf	H	2–0	McLelland, Jarvie	16,800

== Squad ==
=== Appearances & Goals ===
No.	Pos	Nat	Player	Total		Premier Division		Scottish Cup		League Cup		Cup Winners' Cup	
No.	Pos	Nat	Player	Apps	Goals	Apps	Goals	Apps	Goals	Apps	Goals	Apps	Goals
	GK	(Scotland) SCO	Bobby Clark	31	0	23	0	4	0	3	0	1	0
	GK	(Scotland) SCO	Jim Leighton	17	0	11	0	0	0	3	0	3	0
	GK	(Scotland) SCO	John Gardiner	5	0	2	0	1	0	2	0	0	0
	DF	(Scotland) SCO	Willie Miller (c)	51	1	34	0	5	1	8	0	4	0
	DF	(Scotland) SCO	Stuart Kennedy	48	3	32	0	5	0	8	3	3	0
	DF	(Scotland) SCO	Chic McLelland	41	2	26	0	3	0	8	1	4	1
	DF	(Scotland) SCO	Doug Rougvie	34	1	21	0	4	0	6	1	3	0
	DF	(Scotland) SCO	Alex McLeish	29	1	19	1	3	0	4	0	3	0
	DF	(Scotland) SCO	Willie Garner	15	0	12	0	0	0	2	0	1	0
	DF	(Scotland) SCO	Derek Hamilton	12	0	11	0	1	0	0	0	0	0
	DF	(Scotland) SCO	Neil Cooper	10	1	8	1	1	0	1	0	0	0
	DF	(Scotland) SCO	Doug Considine	8	0	6	0	2	0	0	0	0	0
	DF	(Scotland) SCO	Steve Ritchie	1	0	1	0	0	0	0	0	0	0
	DF	(Scotland) SCO	Andy Dornan	0	0	0	0	0	0	0	0	0	0
	MF	(Scotland) SCO	Gordon Strachan	46	6	31	5	4	0	8	0	3	1
	MF	(Scotland) SCO	Dom Sullivan	45	8	31	5	4	0	6	3	4	0
	MF	(Scotland) SCO	Ian Scanlon	44	6	29	2	5	2	6	2	4	0
	MF	(Scotland) SCO	John McMaster	42	4	27	3	4	1	7	0	4	0
	MF	(Scotland) SCO	Andy Watson	3	0	2	0	1	0	0	0	0	0
	MF	(Scotland) SCO	Joe Smith	2	0	2	0	0	0	0	0	0	0
	MF	(Scotland) SCO	Neil Simpson	1	0	0	0	0	0	1	0	0	0
	MF	(Scotland) SCO	Neale Cooper	0	0	0	0	0	0	0	0	0	0
	FW	(Scotland) SCO	Steve Archibald	48	20	32	13	5	4	7	3	4	0
	FW	(Scotland) SCO	Joe Harper	44	32	28	18	5	3	7	9	4	2
	FW	(Scotland) SCO	Drew Jarvie	41	8	27	4	4	0	6	1	4	3
	FW	(Scotland) SCO	Ian Fleming	18	2	12	1	0	0	5	1	1	0
	FW	(Scotland) SCO	Duncan Davidson	13	4	9	2	2	1	2	1	0	0
	FW	(Scotland) SCO	Mark McGhee	11	4	11	4	0	0	0	0	0	0
	FW	(Scotland) SCO	Danny McGeough	0	0	0	0	0	0	0	0	0	0
