= 1979–80 Aberdeen F.C. season =

Aberdeen
1979–80 season
- Chairman: Dick Donald
- Manager: Alex Ferguson
- Scottish Premier Division: 1st (Scottish Champion)
- Scottish Cup: Semi-final
- Scottish League Cup: Runners-up
- UEFA Cup: First round
- Drybrough Cup: Quarter-final
- Top goalscorer: League: Steve Archibald; Drew Jarvie (12 each); All: Steve Archibald (22)
- Highest home attendance: 24,000 vs. Celtic, 31 October 1979 and 19 January 1980
- Lowest home attendance: 5,000 vs. St Mirren, 15 December 1979
- Average home league attendance: 12,625

Aberdeen competed in the Scottish Premier Division, Scottish Cup, League Cup and UEFA Cup in season 1979–80. They finished first in the Premier Division, the club's first Premier Division title and second Scottish league championship. In the cups, they reached the Scottish Cup Semi final, losing to Rangers, and lost the League Cup Final after a replay against Dundee United. In Europe, they were drawn against Eintracht Frankfurt, losing 1–2 on aggregate over two legs in the first round.

== Results ==
=== Friendlies ===
In July 1979, Aberdeen embarked on a tour of Denmark, playing three games. This was followed by friendly matches against three Scottish clubs, and home games against English clubs Coventry City and Tottenham Hotspur. During the season, friendly matches were played against Leicester City, Rothes and an Arbroath Select.

Date	Opponent	H/A	Score	Aberdeen Scorer(s)	Attendance
17 July	(Denmark) Kolding IF	A	2–1	Archibald, Harper	0
19 July	(Denmark) Randers	A	1–0	Jarvie	0
21 July	(Denmark) IK Skovbakken	A	7–0	Archibald (2), McGhee (2), Garner, Cooper, Jarvie	0
30 July	Buckie Thistle	A	1–0	Watson	0
2 August	(England) Coventry City	H	4–1	Miller, Strachan, McGhee, Own goal	0
4 August	Cowdenbeath	A	3–0	McGhee, Jarvie, Rougvie	0
8 August	(England) Tottenham Hotspur	H	2–0	Archibald, McGhee	0
9 August	Nairn County	A	5–1	Jarvie (2), Harper, Scanlon, Cowan	0
5 September	(England) Leicester City	H	1–1	Watson	0
24 February	Rothes	A	4–1	Davidson (2), Scanlon, Hamilton	0
16 March	Arbroath Select	A	2–3	McGhee, Jarvie	1,000

=== Scottish Premier Division ===
Match Day	Date	Opponent	H/A	Score	Aberdeen Scorer(s)	Attendance
1.	11 August	Partick Thistle	A	0–1		7,500
2.	18 August	Hibernian	H	3–0	Archibald, McMaster (2)	10,300
3.	25 August	Dundee United	A	3–1	McGhee, Archibald, Harper	10,982
4.	8 September	Morton	A	2–3	Archibald, McMaster	5,540
5.	15 September	Rangers	H	3–1	McMaster, Strachan, Rougvie	23,000
6.	22 September	Celtic	H	1–2	Strachan	23,000
7.	29 September	Dundee	A	4–0	Archibald, Harper, Jarvie (2)	11,817
8.	6 October	St Mirren	A	2–2	Archibald, Harper	9,163
9.	13 October	Kilmarnock	A	3–1	Strachan, Jarvie, Scanlon	12,000
10.	20 October	Partick Thistle	H	1–1	Davidson	12,000
11.	27 October	Hibernian	A	1–1	Watson	7,000
12.	3 November	Dundee United	H	0–3		12,500
13.	10 November	Morton	H	1–2	McLeish	10,400
14.	17 November	Rangers	A	1–0	Archibald	18,500
15.	15 December	St Mirren	H	2–0	McLeish, Hamilton	5,000
16.	5 January	Morton	A	0–1		6,000
17.	12 January	Rangers	H	3–2	Archibald, Strachan, Hamilton	18,600
18.	19 January	Celtic	H	0–0		24,000
19.	2 February	Dundee	A	3–1	Jarvie (2), Hamilton	7,661
20.	9 February	St Mirren	A	1–1	Strachan	7,900
21.	23 February	Kilmarnock	H	1–2	Archibald	9,600
22.	1 March	Partick Thistle	H	1–1	Jarvie	9,000
23.	15 March	Dundee United	H	2–1	Watson, Jarvie	10,000
24.	19 March	Dundee	H	3–0	Watson, Jarvie, Miller	7,000
25.	22 March	Morton	H	1–0	Jarvie	7,250
26.	29 March	Rangers	A	2–2	Jarvie, Archibald	20,000
27.	1 April	Kilmarnock	A	4–0	McGhee (2), Strachan, Kennedy	5,000
28.	5 April	Celtic	A	2–1	McGhee, Jarvie	40,000
29.	7 April	Dundee	H	2–1	Strachan, Jarvie	11,600
30.	16 April	Hibernian	H	1–1	Watson	15,000
31.	19 April	Kilmarnock	A	3–1	Strachan, McGhee, Archibald	3,000
32.	23 April	Celtic	A	3–1	Strachan, McGhee, Archibald	48,000
33.	26 April	St Mirren	H	2–0	Rougvie, Scanlon	19,000
34.	29 April	Dundee United	A	1–1	Strachan	12,954
35.	3 May	Hibernian	A	5–0	McGhee, Archibald, Watson, Scanlon (2)	12,921
36.	7 May	Partick Thistle	A	1–1	MacKinnon	7,000

==== Final standings ====
Pos	Team	Pld	W	D	L	GF	GA	GD	Pts	Qualification or relegation
1	Aberdeen (C)	36	19	10	7	68	36	+32	48	Qualification for the European Cup first round
2	Celtic	36	18	11	7	61	38	+23	47	Qualification for the Cup Winners' Cup first round
3	St Mirren	36	15	12	9	56	49	+7	42	Qualification for the UEFA Cup first round
4	Dundee United	36	12	13	11	43	30	+13	37	Qualification for the UEFA Cup first round
5	Rangers	36	15	7	14	50	46	+4	37	

Source: Statto and RSSSF
Rules for classification: 1) points; 2) goal difference; 3) number of goals scored.
(C) Champions

==== Results by round ====
Round	1	2	3	4	5	6	7	8	9	10	11	12	13	14	15	16	17	18	19	20	21	22	23	24	25	26	27	28	29	30	31	32	33	34	35	36
Ground	A	H	A	A	H	H	A	A	A	H	A	H	H	A	H	A	H	H	A	A	H	H	H	H	H	A	A	A	H	H	A	A	H	A	A	A
Result	L	W	W	L	W	L	W	D	W	D	D	L	L	W	W	L	W	D	W	D	L	D	W	W	W	D	W	W	W	D	W	W	W	D	W	D
Position	8	4	2	6	2	4	3	4	3	3	3	3	4	3	4	6	5	4	3	3	4	4	6	4	2	2	2	2	2	2	2	1	1	1	1	1

Source: Statto.com
A = Away; H = Home; W = Win; D = Draw; L = Loss

=== Drybrough Cup ===
Round	Date	Opponent	H/A	Score	Aberdeen Scorer(s)	Attendance
QF	28 July	Kilmarnock	A	0–1		0

=== Scottish League Cup ===
Round	Date	Opponent	H/A	Score	Aberdeen Scorer(s)	Attendance
R1 L1	15 August	Arbroath	H	4–0	McGhee, McMaster, Davidson, Jarvie	6,700
R1 L2	22 August	Arbroath	A	1–2	Black	9,000
R2 L1	29 August	Meadowbank Thistle	A	5–0	Garner, McGhee, McMaster (2), Strachan	1,200
R2 L2	1 September	Meadowbank Thistle	H	2–2	McMaster, Strachan	6,000
R3 L1	26 September	Rangers	H	3–1	McLeish, Garner, Harper	18,000
R3 L2	10 October	Rangers	A	2–0	Strachan, Harper	28,000
QF L1	31 October	Celtic	H	3–2	Archibald (3)	24,000
QF L2	24 November	Celtic	A	1–0	McGhee	39,000
SF	1 December	Morton	N	2–1	McGhee, Strachan	11,896
F	8 December	Dundee United	N	0–0		27,173
F R	12 December	Dundee United	N	0–3		28,933

=== Scottish Cup ===
Round	Date	Opponent	H/A	Score	Aberdeen Scorer(s)	Attendance
R3	26 January	Arbroath	A	1–1	Archibald	5,764
R3 R	30 January	Arbroath	H	5–0	Archibald, Scanlon (3), Hamilton	9,127
R4	16 February	Airdrieonians	H	8–0	Scanlon, McMaster, Miller, Strachan, Archibald (4)	10,410
QF	8 March	Partick Thistle	A	2–1	Archibald, Jarvie	8,584
SF	12 April	Rangers	N	0–1		44,000

=== UEFA Cup ===
Round	Date	Opponent	H/A	Score	Aberdeen Scorer(s)	Attendance
R1 L1	19 September	(West Germany) Eintracht Frankfurt	H	1–1	Harper	20,000
R1 L2	3 October	(West Germany) Eintracht Frankfurt	A	0–1		20,000

== Squad ==
=== Appearances & Goals ===
No.	Pos	Nat	Player	Total		Premier Division		Scottish Cup		League Cup		Europe	
No.	Pos	Nat	Player	Apps	Goals	Apps	Goals	Apps	Goals	Apps	Goals	Apps	Goals
	GK	(Scotland) SCO	Bobby Clark	52	0	34	0	5	0	11	0	2	0
	GK	(Scotland) SCO	Jim Leighton	2	0	2	0	0	0	0	0	0	0
	DF	(Scotland) SCO	Doug Considine	25	0	15	0	1	0	7	0	2	0
	DF	(Scotland) SCO	Neil Cooper	1	0	1	0	0	0	0	0	0	0
	DF	(Scotland) SCO	Willie Garner	34	2	20	0	1	0	11	2	2	0
	DF	(Scotland) SCO	Stuart Kennedy	53	1	35	1	5	0	11	0	2	0
	DF	(Scotland) SCO	Alex McLeish	52	3	35	2	5	0	11	1	1	0
	DF	(Scotland) SCO	Willie Miller (c)	46	2	31	1	5	1	8	0	2	0
	DF	(Scotland) SCO	Doug Rougvie	37	2	25	2	4	0	8	0	0	0
	MF	(Scotland) SCO	Doug Bell	16	0	10	0	4	0	2	0	0	0
	MF	(Scotland) SCO	Duncan Davidson	13	2	7	1	2	0	3	1	1	0
	MF	(Scotland) SCO	Derek Hamilton	19	4	13	3	4	1	2	0	0	0
	MF	(Scotland) SCO	John McMaster	51	9	33	4	5	1	11	4	2	0
	MF	(Scotland) SCO	Ian Scanlon	42	8	29	4	4	4	7	0	2	0
	MF	(Scotland) SCO	Gordon Strachan	51	15	33	10	5	1	11	4	2	0
	MF	(Scotland) SCO	Andy Watson	20	5	17	5	3	0	0	0	0	0
	FW	(Scotland) SCO	Steve Archibald	52	22	34	12	5	7	11	3	2	0
	FW	(Scotland) SCO	Joe Harper	20	7	11	3	0	0	7	3	2	1
	FW	(Scotland) SCO	John Hewitt	5	0	4	0	1	0	0	0	0	0
	FW	(Scotland) SCO	Mark McGhee	29	10	21	6	1	0	7	4	0	0
	FW	(Scotland) SCO	Drew Jarvie	44	14	30	12	4	1	8	1	2	0
	FW	(Scotland) SCO	Dom Sullivan	7	0	5	0	1	0	0	0	1	0

=== Unofficial Appearances & Goals ===
No.	Pos	Nat	Player	Drybrough Cup	
No.	Pos	Nat	Player	Apps	Goals
	GK	(Scotland) SCO	Bobby Clark	1	0
	DF	(Scotland) SCO	Doug Rougvie	1	0
	DF	(Scotland) SCO	Willie Miller (c)	1	0
	DF	(Scotland) SCO	Doug Considine	1	0
	DF	(Scotland) SCO	Willie Garner	1	0
	DF	(Scotland) SCO	Derek Hamilton	1	0
	DF	(Scotland) SCO	Alex McLeish	1	0
	MF	(Scotland) SCO	Dom Sullivan	1	0
	MF	(Scotland) SCO	Gordon Strachan	1	0
	FW	(Scotland) SCO	Duncan Davidson	1	0
	FW	(Scotland) SCO	Drew Jarvie	1	0
	FW	(Scotland) SCO	Steve Archibald	1	0
	FW	(Scotland) SCO	Mark McGhee	1	0
