= 1982–83 Aberdeen F.C. season =

Aberdeen F.C.
1982–83 season
- Chairman: Dick Donald
- Manager: Alex Ferguson
- Scottish Premier Division: 3rd
- Scottish Cup: Winners
- Scottish League Cup: Quarter-final
- UEFA Cup Winners' Cup: Winners
- Top goalscorer: League: Mark McGhee (16); All: Mark McGhee (27)
- Highest home attendance: 24,500 (vs Waterschei, 6 April 1983)
- Lowest home attendance: 6,500 (vs Dumbarton, 21 August 1982)
- Average home league attendance: 15,700

Aberdeen competed in the Scottish Premier Division, Scottish Cup, League Cup and European Cup Winners' Cup in season 1982–83. They finished third in the Premier Division behind champions Dundee United and runners-up Celtic. In the cups, they retained the Scottish Cup and won the European Cup Winners' Cup with a 2–1 win over Real Madrid in Gothenburg.

== Results ==
=== Friendlies ===
In late July/early August 1982, Aberdeen played three games against Highland League opposition. On 7 August, English club Ipswich Town provided the opposition for Drew Jarvie's testimonial game, which the English League Division 1 club won 1–0.

Date	Opponent	H/A	Score	Aberdeen Scorer(s)	Attendance
31 July	Ross County	A	5–0	McMaster (2), Harrow (30, 34), Black, (50, 53)	0
2 August	Nairn County	A	5–0	Harrow (4, 22), McLeish (30), McGhee (41), McCall (81)	1,006
3 August	Inverness Thistle	A	4–0	Black (16), Strachan (84 pen., 86, 90)	2,500
7 August	(England) Ipswich Town	H	0–1		8,200

=== Scottish Premier Division ===
Match Day	Date	Opponent	H/A	Score	Aberdeen Scorer(s)	Attendance
1.	4 September	Dundee United	A	0–2		11,683
2.	11 September	Morton	H	4–1	Strachan (15 (pen.), Black (42), Simpson (55), Hewitt (77)	7,500
3.	18 September	St Mirren	A	1–1	McGhee (64)	4,800
4.	25 September	Rangers	H	1–2	Strachan (73 pen.)	20,300
5.	2 October	Motherwell	H	2–1	Cowan (66), Miller (89)	9,000
6.	9 October	Celtic	A	3–1	Strachan (54 pen.), Simpson (58), McGhee (86)	29,733
7.	16 October	Dundee	H	1–0	Weir (34)	10,800
8.	23 October	Kilmarnock	A	2–0	Black (2), Hewitt (76)	3,400
9.	30 October	Hibernian	A	1–1	Weir (90)	6,400
10.	6 November	Dundee United	H	5–1	Cooper (23), Rougvie (29, 41) Black (72), Strachan (85)	14,000
11.	13 November	Morton	A	1–1	Simpson (85)	2,500
12.	20 November	St Mirren	H	4–0	Black (39), Strachan (66 pen.), McGhee (79), Hewitt (90)	10,300
13.	27 November	Rangers	A	1–0	Black (69)	23,000
14.	4 December	Motherwell	A	2–0	Strachan (50 pen.), Weir (66)	4,929
15.	11 December	Celtic	H	1–2	McGhee (18)	24,000
16.	18 December	Dundee	A	2–0	McGhee (28, 54)	6,528
17.	27 December	Kilmarnock	H	2–0	Weir (4), Miller (89)	14,500
18.	1 January	Hibernian	H	2–0	McGhee (28, 54)	14,000
19.	3 January	Dundee United	A	3–0	Simpson (27), Weir (43), McGhee (89)	17,851
20.	8 January	Morton	H	2–0	Simpson (70), McGhee (84)	12,600
21.	15 January	St Mirren	A	1–1	Black (75)	4,530
22.	22 January	Rangers	H	2–0	Rougvie (34), McGhee (77)	21,600
23.	8 February	Motherwell	H	5–1	McLeish (36), McMaster (38), McGhee (52), Black (67), Cooper (71)	13,300
24.	12 February	Celtic	A	3–1	Black (44, 45, 71)	42,831
25.	26 February	Dundee	H	3–1	Weir (58), Black (85), Bell (90)	11,500
26.	5 March	Kilmarnock	A	2–1	Watson (13), McGhee (26)	2,400
27.	19 March	Dundee United	H	1–2	Strachan (66 pen.)	22,800
28.	26 March	Morton	A	2–1	Watson (83), Black (90)	2,800
29.	2 April	St Mirren	H	0–1		16,400
30.	9 April	Rangers	A	1–2	McLeish (15)	19,800
31.	23 April	Celtic	H	1–0	McGhee (33)	24,000
32.	27 April	Motherwell	A	3–0	McGhee (11), Strachan (58), Hewitt (74)	6,715
33.	30 April	Dundee	A	2–0	Hewitt (3), Strachan (40)	10,076
34.	3 May	Hibernian	A	0–0		8,000
35.	5 May	Kilmarnock	H	5–0	Strachan (30, 58), McMaster (39), Angus (46, 85)	12,000
36.	14 May	Hibernian	H	5–0	Brazil (9 o.g.), McGhee (30), Strachan (70 pen.), Cowan (78), Angus (87)	24,000

==== Final standings ====
Pos	Team	Pld	W	D	L	GF	GA	GD	Pts	Qualification or relegation
1	Dundee United (C)	36	24	8	4	90	35	+55	56	Qualification for the European Cup first round
2	Celtic	36	25	5	6	90	36	+54	55	Qualification for the UEFA Cup first round
3	Aberdeen	36	25	5	6	76	25	+51	55	Qualification for the Cup Winners' Cup first round
4	Rangers	36	13	12	11	53	41	+12	38	Qualification for the Cup Winners' Cup first round
5	St Mirren	36	11	12	13	47	51	−4	34	Qualification for the UEFA Cup first round

Source: Statto
Rules for classification: 1) points; 2) goal difference; 3) number of goals scored.
(C) Champions

=== Scottish League Cup ===
==== Group stage ====
Round	Date	Opponent	H/A	Score	Aberdeen Scorer(s)	Attendance
G2	11 August	Morton	A	2–2	Strachan (12), McGhee (53)	3,500
G2	14 August	Dundee	H	3–3	Black (30, 45, 85)	9,000
G2	21 August	Dumbarton	H	3–0	McGhee (5), Strachan (13, 70)	6,500
G2	25 August	Morton	H	3–0	Rougvie (19), Bell (27, 48)	11,000
G2	28 August	Dundee	A	5–1	Strachan (23, 52, 53, 63), McGhee (28)	7,000
G2	8 September	Dumbarton	A	2–1	Bell (76), Hewitt (85)	750

==== Group 2 final table ====
Team	Pld	W	D	L	GF	GA	GD	Pts
Aberdeen	6	4	2	0	18	7	+11	10
Morton	6	3	2	1	16	11	+5	8
Dundee	6	2	2	2	14	19	−5	6
Dumbarton	6	0	0	6	7	18	−11	0

==== Knockout stage ====
Round	Date	Opponent	H/A	Score	Aberdeen Scorer(s)	Attendance
QF L1	22 September	Dundee United	A	1–3	McGhee	14,000
QF L2	6 October	Dundee United	H	0–1		11,700

=== Scottish Cup ===
Round	Date	Opponent	H/A	Score	Aberdeen Scorer(s)	Attendance
R3	29 January	Hibernian	A	4–1	Simpson, McGhee, Weir, Watson	14,289
R4	19 February	Dundee	H	1–0	Simpson	19,000
R5	12 March	Partick Thistle	A	2–1	Cooper, Weir	12,092
SF	16 April	Celtic	N	1–0	Weir	51,152
F	21 May	Rangers	N	1–0	Black	62,979

=== European Cup Winners' Cup ===
After winning the Scottish Cup in 1982, Aberdeen qualified for the 1982–83 European Cup Winners' Cup. After a large preliminary round victory over Sion of Switzerland, the Dons knocked out Dinamo Tirana of Albania and Lech Poznan of Poland to set up a quarter final tie with the West Germans Bayern Munich. After a 0–0 draw in Munich, Aberdeen fell behind early on at home in the second leg before Neil Simpson equalised. Another goal for Bayern Munich seemed to put the game beyond Aberdeen, but two quick goals in the last 20 minutes gave Aberdeen a 3–2 victory. In the semi-finals, Belgian team Waterschei of Genk were beaten 5–2 over two legs, and put Aberdeen into the final. Thousands of fans made the trip from Aberdeen to Gothenburg in Sweden to see the Scottish Cup holders play the Spaniards Real Madrid. In a wet evening at the Ullevi Stadium, Aberdeen won 2–1 after extra time to win their first European trophy.

Round	Date	Opponent	H/A	Score	Aberdeen Scorer(s)	Attendance
P L1	18 August	(Switzerland) Sion	H	7–0	Kennedy, Simpson, Strachan, Black, McGhee, Hewitt, Balet (o.g.)	13,000
P L2	1 September	(Switzerland) Sion	A	4–1	Miller, McGhee (2), Hewitt	2,400
R1 L1	15 September	(Albania) Dinamo Tirana	H	1–0	Hewitt	15,000
R1 L2	29 September	(Albania) Dinamo Tirana	A	0–0		20,000
R2 L1	20 October	(Poland) Lech Poznań	H	2–0	McGhee, Weir	17,600
R2 L2	3 November	(Poland) Lech Poznań	A	1–0	Bell	30,000
QF L1	2 March	(West Germany) FC Bayern Munich	A	0–0		35,000
QF L2	16 March	(West Germany) FC Bayern Munich	H	3–2	Simpson, McLeish, Hewitt	24,000
SF L1	6 April	(Belgium) Waterschei	H	5–1	Simpson, McGhee (2), Weir, Black	24,500
SF L2	19 April	(Belgium) Waterschei	A	0–1		15,000
F	11 May	(Spain) Real Madrid	N	2–1	Black, Hewitt	17,800

== Squad ==
=== Appearances & Goals ===
No.	Pos	Nat	Player	Total		Premier Division		Scottish Cup		League Cup		Europe	
No.	Pos	Nat	Player	Apps	Goals	Apps	Goals	Apps	Goals	Apps	Goals	Apps	Goals
	GK	(Scotland) SCO	Bryan Gunn	1	0	1	0	0	0	0	0	0	0
	GK	(Scotland) SCO	Jim Leighton	59	0	35	0	5	0	8	0	11	0
	DF	(Scotland) SCO	Stuart Kennedy	44	1	25	0	4	0	5	0	10	1
	DF	(Scotland) SCO	Willie Miller (c)	60	3	36	2	5	0	8	0	11	1
	DF	(Scotland) SCO	Brian Mitchell	2	0	1	0	0	0	1	0	0	0
	DF	(Scotland) SCO	Alex McLeish	56	3	34	2	5	0	7	0	10	1
	DF	(Scotland) SCO	Doug Rougvie	56	4	35	3	5	0	7	1	9	0
	MF	(Scotland) SCO	Ian Angus	10	3	5	3	0	0	4	0	1	0
	MF	(Scotland) SCO	Doug Bell	39	5	23	1	4	0	4	3	8	1
	MF	(Scotland) SCO	Neale Cooper	52	3	31	2	5	1	7	0	9	0
	MF	(Scotland) SCO	Derek Hamilton	3	0	2	0	0	0	1	0	0	0
	MF	(Scotland) SCO	John McMaster	42	2	25	2	2	0	6	0	9	0
	MF	(Scotland) SCO	Ian Porteous	1	0	1	0	0	0	0	0	0	0
	MF	(Scotland) SCO	Neil Simpson	56	10	33	5	5	2	7	0	11	3
	MF	(Scotland) SCO	Gordon Strachan	52	20	32	12	3	0	7	7	10	1
	MF	(Scotland) SCO	Andy Watson	26	3	19	2	3	1	2	0	2	0
	MF	(Scotland) SCO	Peter Weir	52	11	31	6	5	3	5	0	11	2
	FW	(Scotland) SCO	Eric Black	52	19	31	12	5	1	8	3	8	3
	FW	(Scotland) SCO	Steve Cowan	5	2	3	2	0	0	2	0	0	0
	FW	(Scotland) SCO	Willie Falconer	2	0	2	0	0	0	0	0	0	0
	FW	(Scotland) SCO	John Hewitt	33	11	16	5	1	0	7	1	9	5
	FW	(Scotland) SCO	Walker McCall	2	0	2	0	0	0	0	0	0	0
	FW	(Scotland) SCO	Mark McGhee	55	27	32	16	5	1	7	4	11	6
