= John Hewitt (footballer) =

Scottish footballer and manager

Personal information
- Full name: John Hewitt
- Date of birth: 9 February 1963 (age 63)
- Place of birth: Aberdeen, Scotland
- Height: 1.73 m (5 ft 8 in)
- Position: Forward

Youth career
- Middlefield Wasps Boys' Club

Senior career*
Years	Team	Apps	(Gls)
1979–1989	Aberdeen	241	(55)
1989–1992	Celtic	16	(0)
1991–1992	→ Middlesbrough (loan)	2	(0)
1992	St Mirren	14	(5)
1992	Deveronvale		
1992–1996	St Mirren	75	(11)
1996–1997	Dundalk	9	(0)
1997	Ross County	7	(1)
1997–1998	Cove Rangers		
1998–1999	Brantwood		
Total		364	(72)

International career
1982–1984	Scotland U21	6	(1)

Managerial career
- 1996–1997: Dundalk (player-manager)
- 1997–1999: Cove Rangers (assistant)
- * Club domestic league appearances and goals

John Hewitt (born 9 February 1963) is a Scottish former footballer and manager, who spent the majority of his playing career with Aberdeen, but also had spells with Celtic and St Mirren among others. He also spent a short time in management in Ireland with Dundalk before retiring from the game.

He is best known as the scorer of a number of significant goals for Aberdeen, including the winning goal in the 1983 Cup Winners' Cup final. He was inducted into the Aberdeen FC "Hall of Fame" as one of the founding members in 2003.

== Playing career ==
Hewitt was a product of Cornhill Primary and Middlefield Boys' Club in Aberdeen, and was a schoolboy international before signing for Aberdeen, the club he had supported as a boy, in the face of competition from a number of other clubs. He made his full debut for Aberdeen in 1979 at the age of 17, and by the 1981–82 season had become a regular in the side. in January 1982, Hewitt scored the only goal of the game in a third round Scottish Cup tie against Motherwell. This goal, timed at 9.6 seconds, was not only the fastest recorded in Scottish Cup history, but proved to be the first step in Aberdeen's route to the following season's European success; the club qualified for the Cup Winners' Cup by going on to win the Scottish Cup that season.

The following season, Hewitt again featured prominently for Aberdeen, but it is for two substitute appearances in Europe that he is best known. On 16 March 1983, Hewitt came off the bench to score the winning goal in the Cup Winners' Cup quarter-final tie against Bayern Munich, and then repeated the feat by scoring the winner in extra time in the final against Real Madrid.

Hewitt also scored twice in the 1986 Scottish Cup final against Hearts – a game in which he was named Man of the match. In all, he won three championship medals, four Scottish Cup winners medals, one Scottish League Cup winners medal as well as the Cup Winners' Cup and the following season's European Super Cup while at Aberdeen.

In 1989, Hewitt moved to Celtic, but failed to break into the first team on a regular basis, and subsequently spent four more successful seasons with St Mirren. A short, unsuccessful spell as player-manager of Dundalk was notable only for the fact that he scored the only goal of a pre-season friendly game against Aberdeen. Hewitt retired from the game after a season as assistant manager to his former Aberdeen team-mate Doug Rougvie at Cove Rangers.

== Career statistics ==
=== Club ===
Appearances and goals by club, season and competition
Club	Season	League			National cup		League cup		Europe		Total	
Club	Season	Division	Apps	Goals	Apps	Goals	Apps	Goals	Apps	Goals	Apps	Goals
Aberdeen	1979–80	Scottish Premier Division	4	0	1	0	0	0	0	0	5	0
Aberdeen	1980–81	Scottish Premier Division	22	2	1	0	3	1	3	0	29	3
Aberdeen	1981–82	Scottish Premier Division	25	11	6	2	8	2	6	4	45	19
Aberdeen	1982–83	Scottish Premier Division	16	5	1	0	7	1	9	5	33	11
Aberdeen	1983–84	Scottish Premier Division	32	12	5	0	10	4	10	0	57	16
Aberdeen	1984–85	Scottish Premier Division	21	4	5	1	0	0	2	0	28	5
Aberdeen	1985–86	Scottish Premier Division	23	6	4	4	5	1	6	3	38	14
Aberdeen	1986–87	Scottish Premier Division	34	11	3	1	3	2	2	0	42	14
Aberdeen	1987–88	Scottish Premier Division	37	1	5	0	5	2	4	0	51	3
Aberdeen	1988–89	Scottish Premier Division	27	3	2	0	5	2	1	0	35	5
Aberdeen	Total		241	55	33	8	46	15	43	12	363	90
Celtic	1989–90	Scottish Premier Division	12	0	0	0	3	0	0	0	15	0
Celtic	1990–91	Scottish Premier Division	4	0	0	0	2	0	0	0	6	0
Celtic	1991–92	Scottish Premier Division	0	0	0	0	0	0	0	0	0	0
Celtic	Total		16	0	0	0	5	0	0	0	21	0
Middlesbrough (loan)	1991–92	Second Division	2	0	0	0	0	0	0	0	2	0
St Mirren (loan)	1991–92	Scottish Premier Division	14	5	0	0	0	0	0	0	14	5
St Mirren	1992–93	Scottish First Division	–	–	–	–	–	–	–	–	–	–
St Mirren	1993–94	Scottish First Division	–	–	–	–	–	–	–	–	–	–
St Mirren	1994–95	Scottish First Division	–	–	–	–	–	–	–	–	–	–
St Mirren	1995–96	Scottish First Division	–	–	–	–	–	–	–	–	–	–
St Mirren	Total		75	11	–	–	–	–	–	–	87	11
Deveronvale (loan)	1992–93	Highland League	–	–	–	–	–	–	–	–	–	–
Dundalk	1996–97	Ireland Premier Division	9	0	3	0	3	0	0	0	15	0
Ross County	1996–97	Scottish Third Division	7	1	0	0	0	0	0	0	7	1
Cove Rangers	1997–98	Highland League	–	–	–	–	–	–	–	–	–	–
Brantwood	1998–99	Irish First Division	–	–	–	–	–	–	–	–	–	–
Career total			364+	72+	36+	8+	54+	15+	43	12	497+	107+

== Honours ==
Aberdeen

- Scottish Premier Division: 1979–80, 1983–84, 1984–85
- Scottish Cup: 1981–82, 1982–83, 1983–84, 1985–86, 1989–90
- Scottish League Cup: 1985–86
- Drybrough Cup: 1980
- European Cup Winners' Cup: 1982–83
- European Super Cup: 1983
