= 1979–80 Celtic F.C. season =

Celtic
1979–80 season
- Chairman: Desmond White
- Manager: Billy McNeill
- Stadium: Celtic Park
- Scottish Premier Division: 2nd
- Scottish Cup: Winners
- Scottish League Cup: Quarter-finalists
- European Cup: Quarter-finalists
- Drybrough Cup: Finalists
- Top goalscorer: League: George McCluskey 10; All: George McCluskey & Johnny Doyle 15
- Highest home attendance: 53,952
- Lowest home attendance: 16,695
- Average home league attendance: 28,499

During the 1979–80 Scottish football season, Celtic competed in the Scottish Premier Division.

== Squad ==
Note: Flags indicate national team as defined under FIFA eligibility rules; some limited exceptions apply. Players may hold more than one non-FIFA nationality.

No.	Pos.	Nation	Player
—	GK	ENG	Peter Latchford
—	GK	IRL	Packie Bonner
—	DF	SCO	Danny McGrain
—	DF	SCO	Andy Lynch
—	DF	SCO	Roddie MacDonald
—	DF	SCO	Roy Aitken
—	DF	ISL	Jóhannes Eðvaldsson
—	DF	SCO	Alan Sneddon
—	DF	SCO	Tom McAdam
—	DF	SCO	Jim Duffy
—	MF	SCO	Tommy Burns
—	MF	SCO	Jim Casey
—	MF	SCO	John Weir
—	MF	SCO	Johnny Doyle
—	MF	SCO	Vic Davidson

No.	Pos.	Nation	Player
—	MF	SCO	Mike Conroy
—	MF	SCO	Peter Mackie
—	MF	SCO	Dom Sullivan
—	MF	SCO	John Halpin
—	MF	SCO	Gordon Greenfield
—	MF	SCO	John Buckley
—	MF	SCO	Danny Crainie
—	MF	SCO	Jim Feeney
—	MF	SCO	Paul McStay
—	MF	SCO	Murdo MacLeod
—	FW	SCO	George McCluskey
—	FW	SCO	Bobby Lennox
—	FW	SCO	David Provan
—	FW	SCO	Frank McGarvey
—	FW	SCO	Charlie Nicholas

== Competitions ==
=== Scottish Premier Division ===
==== League table ====
Pos	Team	Pld	W	D	L	GF	GA	GD	Pts	Qualification or relegation
1	Aberdeen (C)	36	19	10	7	68	36	+32	48	Qualification for the European Cup first round
2	Celtic	36	18	11	7	61	38	+23	47	Qualification for the Cup Winners' Cup first round
3	St Mirren	36	15	12	9	56	49	+7	42	Qualification for the UEFA Cup first round
4	Dundee United	36	12	13	11	43	30	+13	37	Qualification for the UEFA Cup first round
5	Rangers	36	15	7	14	50	46	+4	37	

Source: Statto and RSSSF
Rules for classification: 1) points; 2) goal difference; 3) number of goals scored.
(C) Champions

==== Matches ====
11 August 1979 Premier League	Celtic	3–2	Morton	Glasgow
15:00				Stadium: Celtic Park; Attendance: 24,841

18 August 1979 Premier League	Rangers	2–2	Celtic	Glasgow
15:00	MacDonald 49'; Russell 54'		Sneddon 84'; McAdam 87'	Stadium: Ibrox Stadium; Attendance: 29,767; Referee: Ian Foote

25 August 1979 Premier League	Celtic	5–0	Kilmarnock	Glasgow
15:00				Stadium: Celtic Park; Attendance: 24,584

8 September 1979 Premier League	Celtic	2–2	Dundee United	Glasgow
15:00				Stadium: Celtic Park; Attendance: 25,959

15 September 1979 Premier League	Hibernian	1–3	Celtic	Edinburgh
15:00 BST				Stadium: Easter Road; Attendance: 19,086

22 September 1979 Premier League	Aberdeen	1–2	Celtic	Aberdeen
15:00 BST				Stadium: Pittodrie Stadium; Attendance: 22,256

29 September 1979 Premier League	Celtic	5–1	St Mirren	Glasgow
15:00 BST				Stadium: Celtic Park; Attendance: 27,788

6 October 1979 Premier League	Partick Thistle	0–0	Celtic	Glasgow
15:00 BST				Stadium: Firhill Park; Attendance: 23,816

13 October 1979 Premier League	Celtic	3–0	Dundee	Glasgow
15:00 BST				Stadium: Celtic Park; Attendance: 23,483

20 October 1979 Premier League	Morton	1–0	Celtic	Greenock
15:00 BST				Stadium: Cappielow Park; Attendance: 19,448

27 October 1979 Premier League	Celtic	1–0	Rangers	Glasgow
15:00 BST				Stadium: Celtic Park; Attendance: 53,952

3 November 1979 Premier League	Kilmarnock	2–0	Celtic	Kilmarnock
15:00 GMT				Stadium: Rugby Park; Attendance: 16,918

10 November 1979 Premier League	Dundee United	0–1	Celtic	Dundee
15:00 GMT				Stadium: Tannadice Park; Attendance: 18,630

17 November 1979 Premier League	Celtic	3–0	Hibernian	Glasgow
15:00 GMT				Stadium: Celtic Park; Attendance: 23,511

1 December 1979 Premier League	St Mirren	2–1	Celtic	Paisley
15:00 GMT				Stadium: St Mirren Park, Love Street; Attendance: 20,360

15 December 1979 Premier League	Celtic	5–1	Partick Thistle	Glasgow
15:00 GMT				Stadium: Celtic Park; Attendance: 17,849

22 December 1979 Premier League	Celtic	3–1	Morton	Glasgow
15:00 GMT				Stadium: Celtic Park; Attendance: 26,025

29 December 1979 Premier League	Celtic	1–1	Rangers	Glasgow
15:00 GMT				Stadium: Ibrox Stadium; Attendance: 33,843

5 January 1980 Premier League	Celtic	1–0	Dundee United	Glasgow
15:00 GMT				Stadium: Celtic Park; Attendance: 23,822

12 January 1980 Premier League	Hibernian	1–1	Celtic	Edinburgh
15:00 GMT				Stadium: Easter Road; Attendance: 21,932

19 January 1980 Premier League	Aberdeen	0–0	Celtic	Aberdeen
15:00 GMT				Stadium: Pittodrie Stadium; Attendance: 22,231

9 February 1980 Premier League	Partick Thistle	1–1	Celtic	Glasgow
15:00 GMT				Stadium: Firhill Park; Attendance: 15,868

23 February 1980 Premier League	Celtic	2–2	Dundee	Glasgow
15:00 GMT				Stadium: Celtic Park; Attendance: 21,371

1 March 1980 Premier League	Morton	0–1	Celtic	Greenock
15:00 GMT				Stadium: Cappielow Park; Attendance: 17,078

12 March 1980 Premier League	Celtic	2–2	St Mirren	Glasgow
19:30 GMT				Stadium: Celtic Park; Attendance: 28,985

15 March 1980 Premier League	Kilmarnock	1–1	Celtic	Kilmarnock
15:00 GMT				Stadium: Rugby Park; Attendance: 14,965

29 March 1980 Premier League	Celtic	4–0	Hibernian	Glasgow
15:00 GMT				Stadium: Celtic Park; Attendance: 20,926

2 April 1980 Premier League	Celtic	1–0	Rangers	Glasgow
19:30 GMT				Stadium: Celtic Park; Attendance: 49,668

5 April 1980 Premier League	Celtic	1–2	Aberdeen	Glasgow
15:00 GMT				Stadium: Celtic Park; Attendance: 12,980

8 April 1980 Premier League	Dundee United	3–0	Celtic	Dundee
19:30 BST				Stadium: Tannadice Park; Attendance: 14,616

16 April 1980 Premier League	Celtic	2–0	Kilmarnock	Glasgow
19:30 BST				Stadium: Celtic Park; Attendance: 16,695

19 April 1980 Premier League	Dundee	5–1	Celtic	Dundee
15:00 BST				Stadium: Dens Park; Attendance: 14,633

23 April 1980 Premier League	Celtic	1–3	Aberdeen	Glasgow
19:30 BST				Stadium: Celtic Park; Attendance: 46,877

26 April 1980 Premier League	Celtic	2–1	Partick Thistle	Glasgow
15:00 BST				Stadium: Celtic Park; Attendance: 18,487

30 April 1980 Premier League	Dundee	0–2	Celtic	Dundee
19:30 BST				Stadium: Dens Park; Attendance: 10,200

3 May 1980 Premier League	St Mirren	0–0	Celtic	Paisley
15:00 BST				Stadium: St Mirren Park, Love Street; Attendance: 20,270

=== Scottish Cup ===
26 January 1980 Third round	Celtic	2–1	Raith Rovers	Glasgow
15:00 GMT				Stadium: Celtic Park; Attendance: 18,000

16 February 1980 Fourth round	Celtic	1–1	St Mirren	Glasgow
15:00 GMT				Stadium: Celtic Park; Attendance: 32,000

20 February 1980 Fourth round replay	St Mirren	2–3	Celtic	Paisley
19:30 GMT				Stadium: St Mirren Park, Love Street; Attendance: 27,166

8 March 1980 Fifth round	Celtic	2–0	Morton	Glasgow
15:00 GMT				Stadium: Celtic Park; Attendance: 35,000

12 April 1980 Semi-final	Celtic	5–0	Hibernian	Glasgow
15:00 GMT				Stadium: Hampden Park; Attendance: 33,445

10 May 1980 Final	Celtic	1–0 (a.e.t.)	Rangers	Glasgow
15:00 GMT				Stadium: Hampden Park; Attendance: 70,314

=== Scottish League Cup ===
29 August 1979 Second round 1st leg	Falkirk	1–2	Celtic	Falkirk
19:30 GMT				Stadium: Brockville Park; Attendance: 8,583

1 September 1979 Second round 2nd leg	Celtic	4–1 (6–2 agg.)	Falkirk	Glasgow
15:00 GMT				Stadium: Celtic Park; Attendance: 16,090

26 September 1979 Third round 1st leg	Stirling Albion	1–2	Celtic	Stirling
19:30 GMT				Stadium: Annfield Stadium; Attendance: 7,592

10 October 1979 Third round 2nd leg	Celtic	2–0 (4–1 agg.)	Stirling Albion	Glasgow
19:30 GMT				Stadium: Celtic Park; Attendance: 8,924

31 October 1979 Quarter-final 1st leg	Aberdeen	3–2	Celtic	Aberdeen
19:30 GMT				Stadium: Pittodrie Stadium; Attendance: 20,972

24 November 1979 Quarter-final 2nd leg	Celtic	0–1 (2–4 agg.)	Aberdeen	Glasgow
19:30 GMT				Stadium: Celtic Park; Attendance: 37,768

=== European Cup ===
19 September 1979 1st round 1st leg	Partizani Tirana (Albania)	1–0	(Scotland) Celtic	Tirana
20:00 GMT				Stadium: Selman Stërmasi Stadium; Attendance: 19,000

24 October 1979 1st round 2nd leg	Celtic (Scotland)	4–1 (4–2 agg.)	(Albania) Partizani Tirana	Glasgow
20:00 GMT				Stadium: Celtic Park; Attendance: 51,000

19 September 1979 2nd round 1st leg	Celtic (Scotland)	3–2	(Republic of Ireland) Dundalk	Glasgow
20:00 GMT				Stadium: Celtic Park; Attendance: 33,000

3 October 1979 2nd round 2nd leg	Dundalk (Republic of Ireland)	0–0 (2–3 agg.)	(Scotland) Celtic	Dundalk
20:00 GMT				Stadium: Oriel Park; Attendance: 16,300

5 March 1980 Quarter-final 1st leg	Celtic (Scotland)	2–0	(Spain) Real Madrid	Glasgow
20:00 GMT				Stadium: Celtic Park; Attendance: 67,000

19 March 1980 Quarter-final 2nd leg	Real Madrid (Spain)	3–0 (2–3 agg.)	(Scotland) Celtic	Madrid
20:00 GMT				Stadium: Santiago Bernabéu Stadium; Attendance: 110,000

=== Drybrough Cup ===
30 July 1979 First round	Celtic	5–0	Clydebank	Glasgow
15:00 BST				Stadium: Celtic Park; Attendance: 18,000

1 August 1979 Semi-final	Celtic	3–2 (a.e.t.)	Dundee United	Glasgow
15:00 BST				Stadium: Celtic Park; Attendance: 21,000

4 August 1979 Final	Celtic	1–3	Rangers	Glasgow
15:00 BST				Stadium: Hampden Park; Attendance: 40,609

=== Glasgow Cup ===
14 August 1979 Quarter-final	Queens Park	1–3	Celtic	Glasgow
15:00 BST				Stadium: Celtic Park; Attendance: 7,000

22 August 1979 Semi-final	Celtic	3–0	Clyde	Glasgow
19:30 BST				Stadium: Celtic Park; Attendance: 7,000

== Club Staff ==
Board of Directors
Position	Name
Chairman	Desmond White
Secretary	Desmond White
Directors	Thomas Devlin James Farrell Kevin Kelly

Football Staff
Position	Name
Manager	Billy McNeill
Assistiant Manager	John Clark
Reserve Team Manager	Frank Connor
Reserve Coach	Jimmy Lumsden
Physio	Brian Scott
Trainer	Neil Mochan
Massuer	Jimmy Steele

== Transfers ==
Transfers In
Date	Name	From	Transfer Fee
October 1979	(Scotland) Dom Sullivan	(Scotland) Aberdeen	£80,000
March 1980	(Scotland) Frank McGarvey	(England) Liverpool	£250,000
		Total Transfer Fees	£330,000

Transfer Out
Date	Name	To	Transfer Fee
June 1979	(Scotland) Ronnie Glavin	(England) Barnsley	£50,000
June 1979	(Scotland) John McCluskey	Retired	Released
July 1979	(Scotland) Brian Coyne	(England) Shrewsbury Town	Free
November 1979	(Scotland) Peter Mackie	(Scotland) Dundee	£35,000
December 1979	(Scotland) Joe Filippi	(Scotland) Clyde	Free Transfer
February 1980	(Iceland) Jóhannes Eðvaldsson	(United States) Tulsa Roughnecks	Free Transfer
April 1980	(Scotland) Andy Lynch	(United States) Philadelphia Fury	Free Transfer
		Total Transfer Fees	£85,000
