= Dougie Bell =

Scottish footballer & manager (born 1959)

Personal information
- Full name: Douglas Keith Bell
- Date of birth: 5 September 1959 (age 67)
- Place of birth: Paisley, Scotland
- Height: 5 ft 11 in (1.80 m)
- Position: Midfielder

Youth career
- Cumbernauld Colts

Senior career*
Years	Team	Apps	(Gls)
1978–1979	St Mirren	2	(1)
1979–1985	Aberdeen	109	(6)
1985–1987	Rangers	35	(1)
1987	→ St Mirren (loan)	4	(0)
1987	Hibernian	32	(3)
1987–1989	Shrewsbury Town	50	(6)
1989	→ Hull City (loan)	4	(0)
1989–1991	Birmingham City	16	(0)
1989	→ Portadown (loan)	2	(0)
1991–1992	Partick Thistle	12	(0)
1992–1993	Portadown		
1993–1994	Clyde	18	(0)
1994–1995	Elgin City		
1995	Alloa Athletic	5	(0)
1995–1996	Albion Rovers	21	(0)
1996–1997	Linlithgow Rose		
Total		310+	(17+)

International career
1980–1984	Scotland U21	2	(0)

Managerial career
- 1998–1999: Kilsyth Rangers
- 1999–2000: Vale of Clyde
- 2000–2001: Baillieston Juniors
- * Club domestic league appearances and goals

Douglas Keith Bell (born 5 September 1959) is a Scottish former professional footballer.

== Playing career ==
Bell played for Cumbernauld Colts, St Mirren (two spells), Aberdeen, Rangers, Hibernian, Shrewsbury Town, Hull City, Birmingham City, Portadown (two spells), Partick Thistle, Clyde, Elgin City, Alloa Athletic, Albion Rovers and Linlithgow Rose. He played twice for Scotland at under-21 level.

During his time with Aberdeen, Bell won the Scottish League three times and the Scottish Cup twice, as well as the European Super Cup in 1983 (missing other trophy wins earlier that year due to injury). In those days, only those on the team-sheet for the final received a medal, but, in April 2023, Bell, manager Alex Ferguson, and four others were retrospectively given winners' medals for the victory in the European Cup Winners' Cup. He was a league champion again with Rangers in 1986–87.

== Managerial career ==
Bell took temporary charge of Clyde in January 2008, after Colin Hendry resigned from his position of manager. Bell was in control of the team for the matches against Dundee and Hamilton Academical. He was sent from the dugout to the stand in both matches, and received a 10-match touchline ban.

Bell took charge of the Clyde reserve team for the 2007–08 campaign, and won the Reserve League Cup. He was promoted to the position of assistant manager in June 2008.

== Career statistics ==
Appearances and goals by club, season and competition
Club	Season	League			National cup (Note: Includes Scottish Cup, FA Cup, Irish Cup)		League cup (Note: Includes Scottish League Cup, Football League Cup)		Other		Total	
Club	Season	Division	Apps	Goals	Apps	Goals	Apps	Goals	Apps	Goals	Apps	Goals
St Mirren	1977–78	Scottish Premier Division	2	1	0	0	0	0	—		2	1
St Mirren	1978–79	Scottish Premier Division	0	0	0	0	0	0	—		0	0
St Mirren	Total		2	1	0	0	0	0	—		2	1
Aberdeen	1979–80	Scottish Premier Division	10	0	5	0	2	0	—		17	0
Aberdeen	1980–81	Scottish Premier Division	17	1	2	0	6	1	4 (Note: Appearance(s) in European Cup)	0	29	2
Aberdeen	1981–82	Scottish Premier Division	13	1	4	0	8	2	2 (Note: Appearances in UEFA Cup)	0	27	3
Aberdeen	1982–83	Scottish Premier Division	23	1	4	0	4	3	8 (Note: Appearances in European Cup Winners' Cup)	1	39	5
Aberdeen	1983–84	Scottish Premier Division	24	3	2	0	8	1	10 (Note: Eight appearances in European Cup Winners' Cup, two in European Super Cup)	0	44	4
Aberdeen	1984–85	Scottish Premier Division	22	0	5	0	1	0	1	0	29	0
Aberdeen	Total		109	6	22	0	29	7	25	1	185	14
Rangers	1985–86	Scottish Premier Division	23	0	0	0	4	0	2	0	29	0
Rangers	1986–87	Scottish Premier Division	12	1	0	0	0	0	3	0	15	1
Rangers	Total		35	1	0	0	4	0	5	0	44	1
St Mirren (loan)	1986–87	Scottish Premier Division	4	0	0	0	2	0	—		6	0
Hibernian	1986–87	Scottish Premier Division	16	2	1	0	0	0	—		17	2
Hibernian	1987–88	Scottish Premier Division	16	1	0	0	2	0	—		18	1
Hibernian	Total		32	3	1	0	2	0	—		35	3
Shrewsbury Town	1988–89	Second Division	15	2	2	0	0	0	0	0	17	2
Shrewsbury Town	1989–90	Second Division	26	1	1	0	0	0	1 (Note: Appearance in Full Members' Cup)	0	28	1
Shrewsbury Town	1990–91	Second Division	9	3	—		4	0	—		13	3
Shrewsbury Town	Total		50	6	3	0	4	0	1	0	58	6
Hull City (loan)	1988–89	Second Division	4	0	—		—		—		4	0
Birmingham City	1989–90	Third Division	15	0	4	0	0	0	2 (Note: Appearances in Associate Members' Cup)	0	21	0
Birmingham City	1990–91	Third Division	1	0	0	0	0	0	0	0	1	0
Birmingham City	Total		16	0	4	0	0	0	2	0	22	0
Portadown (loan)	1989–90	Irish League	2	0	1	0	—		—		3	0
Partick Thistle	1991–92	Scottish First Division	12	0	0	0	0	0	2 (Note: Appearances in Scottish League Challenge Cup)	0	14	0
Clyde	1993–94	Scottish First Division	18	0	0	0	0	0	0	0	18	0
Alloa Athletic	1994–95	Scottish Third Division	5	0	—		—		—		5	0
Albion Rovers	1995–96	Scottish Third Division	21	0	1	0	0	0	0	0	22	0
Career total			310	17	32	0	39	7	35	1	416	25

== Honours ==
Aberdeen

- Scottish Premier Division: 1979–80, 1983–84, 1984–85
- Scottish Cup: 1981–82, 1983–84
- European Cup Winners' Cup: 1982–83
- European Super Cup: 1983

Rangers

- Scottish Premier Division: 1986–87
