= Dom Sullivan =

Scottish footballer & manager (born 1951)

Personal information
- Full name: Dominick Sullivan
- Date of birth: 1 April 1951 (age 75)
- Place of birth: Glasgow, Scotland
- Position: Midfielder

Senior career*
Years	Team	Apps	(Gls)
1970–1976	Clyde	184	(16)
1976–1979	Aberdeen	97	(11)
1979–1983	Celtic	84	(12)
1983	Manchester City	1	
1983–1985	Morton	52	(6)
1985–1988	Alloa Athletic	59	(4)
Total		477	(49)

International career
1974–1975	Scotland U23	2	(0)

Managerial career
- 1986–1987: Alloa Athletic
- 1989–1990: Falkirk (Caretaker)
- 1990–1992: East Stirlingshire
- * Club domestic league appearances and goals

Dominick Sullivan (born 1 April 1951) is a Scottish former footballer who played as a midfielder.

== Playing career ==
Sullivan began his career with Clyde, making 176 league appearances in 6 years before moving to Aberdeen. He moved to Celtic in 1979 and had spells with Greenock Morton and Alloa Athletic before retiring.

== Management career ==
Dom Sullivan was appointed as player-manager of Alloa Athletic in the 1986–87 season. After retiring as a player, he later managed East Stirlingshire in the early 1990s. Whilst a coach at Falkirk Dom was twice made caretaker manager in between the spells of Jim Duffy and Billy Lamont, then Billy Lamont and Jim Jefferies.

== Post-football career ==
After retiring from football, Sullivan ran the Railway Hotel pub in Denny.

== Career statistics ==
=== Club ===
Appearances and goals by club, season and competition
Club	Seasons	League			Scottish Cup		League Cup		Europe		Total	
Club	Seasons	Division	Apps	Goals	Apps	Goals	Apps	Goals	Apps	Goals	Apps	Goals
Clyde	1970–71	Scottish Division One	29	0	3	0	0	0	0	0	32	0
Clyde	1971–72	Scottish Division One	29	3	1	0	5	0	0	0	35	3
Clyde	1972–73	Scottish Second Division	33	7	0	0	6	3	–	–	39	10
Clyde	1973–74	Scottish Division One	34	1	1	0	11	2	0	0	46	3
Clyde	1974–75	Scottish Division One	34	4	1	0	6	0	0	0	41	4
Clyde	1975–76	Scottish First Division	25	1	0	0	6	0	–	–	31	1
Clyde	Total		184	16	6	0	34	5	0	0	224	21
Aberdeen	1976–77	Scottish Premier Division	32	3	2	0	11	0	0	0	45	3
Aberdeen	1977–78	Scottish Premier Division	29	3	6	0	3	0	1	0	39	3
Aberdeen	1978–79	Scottish Premier Division	31	5	4	0	6	3	4	0	45	8
Aberdeen	1979–80	Scottish Premier Division	5	0	0	0	1	0	2	0	8	0
Aberdeen	Total		97	11	12	0	21	3	7	0	137	14
Celtic	1979–80	Scottish Premier Division	15	5	1	0	0	0	0	0	16	5
Celtic	1980–81	Scottish Premier Division	30	3	5	0	6	1	4	1	45	5
Celtic	1981–82	Scottish Premier Division	31	3	1	0	6	1	2	0	40	4
Celtic	1982–83	Scottish Premier Division	8	1	2	0	1	0	1	0	12	1
Celtic	Total		84	12	9	0	13	2	7	1	113	15
Greenock Morton	1983–84	Scottish First Division	25	3	3	1	2	2	–	–	30	6
Greenock Morton	1984–85	Scottish Premier Division	27	3	2	1	1	0	0	0	30	4
Greenock Morton	Total		52	6	5	2	3	2	0	0	60	10
Alloa Athletic	1985–86	Scottish First Division	–	–	–	–	–	–	–	–	–	–
Alloa Athletic	1986–87	Scottish Second Division	–	–	–	–	–	–	–	–	–	–
Alloa Athletic	1987–88	Scottish Second Division	–	–	–	–	–	–	–	–	–	–
Alloa Athletic	Total		59	4	-	-	-	-	-	-	59+	4+
Career total			476	49	33+	2+	71+	12+	14	1	593	64

=== Managerial ===
Managerial record by team and tenure
Team	From	To	Record				
Team	From	To	P	W	L	D	Win %
Alloa Athletic	1986	1987	68	23	31	14	33.82%
Falkirk (caretaker)	1989	1989	3	1	1	1	33.33%
East Stirlingshire	1990	1992	89	27	38	24	30.34%
Total			160	51	70	39	32.50%

== Honours ==
Clyde

- Scottish Division Two: 1972–73

Aberdeen

- Scottish Premier Division: Runner-up 1977–78
- Scottish League Cup: 1976–77
- Scottish Cup: Runner-up 1977–78

Celtic

- Scottish Premier Division: 1980–81, 1981–82
  - Runner-up: 1979–80, 1982–83

Morton

- Scottish First Division: 1983–84
- Renfrewshire Cup: Runner-up 1983–84
