= 1977–78 Aberdeen F.C. season =

Aberdeen F.C.
1977–1978 season
- Chairman: Dick Donald
- Manager: Billy McNeill
- Scottish Premier Division: 2nd
- Scottish Cup: Runner-up
- Scottish League Cup: Third Round
- UEFA Cup: First Round
- Top goalscorer: League: Joe Harper (17); All: Joe Harper (27)
- Highest home attendance: 26,000 vs. R.W.D. Molenbeek, 28 September 1977
- Lowest home attendance: 8,250 vs. Cowdenbeath, 31 August 1977
- Average home league attendance: 14,339

== Results ==
=== Scottish Premier Division ===
Match Day	Date	Opponent	H/A	Score	Aberdeen Scorer(s)	Attendance
1.	13 August	Rangers	H	3–1	Jarvie (2), Harper	21,500
2.	19 August	Clydebank	A	3–1	Garner, Harper, Davidson	7,000
3.	27 August	Dundee United	H	0–0		16,100
4.	10 September	Ayr United	A	1–0	Harper	4,700
5.	17 September	Celtic	H	2–1	Garner	25,800
6.	24 September	Partick Thistle	H	2–1	Harper (2)	11,900
7.	1 October	Motherwell	A	1–1	McMaster	6,466
8.	8 October	St Mirren	A	4–0	Jarvie (3), Fleming	24,000
9.	15 October	Hibernian	H	1–2	Jarvie	11,900
10.	22 October	Rangers	A	1–3	Harper	37,000
11.	29 October	Clydebank	H	1–1	Harper	9,400
12.	5 November	Dundee United	A	1–0	Fleming	10,000
13.	12 November	Ayr United	H	0–0		9,350
14.	19 November	Celtic	A	2–3	Harper, Jarvie	27,000
15.	26 November	Partick Thistle	A	0–1		12,800
16.	3 December	Motherwell	H	4–1	Robb (3), Strachan	9,500
17.	10 December	St Mirren	H	3–1	Gibson (2), Robb	9,000
18.	17 December	Hibernian	A	0–2		6,601
19.	24 December	Rangers	H	4–0	Gibson, Robb, Harper, Jarvie	21,000
20.	31 December	Clydebank	A	1–0	McMaster	2,800
21.	2 January	Dundee United	H	1–0	Fleming	23,000
22.	7 January	Ayr United	A	1–1	McMaster	5,966
23.	14 January	Celtic	H	2–1	Sullivan (2)	24,600
24.	4 February	Motherwell	A	0–0		8,845
25.	25 February	Hibernian	H	3–0	Stewart, Davidson, Miller	11,200
26.	4 March	Rangers	A	3–0	Archibald, Harper	34,500
27.	18 March	Dundee United	A	0–0		9,671
28.	21 March	Clydebank	H	2–0	Davidson, Archibald	9,600
29.	25 March	Ayr United	H	4–1	Jarvie (2), Davidson, Archibald	11,000
30.	29 March	St Mirren	A	2–1	Davidson, Archibald	9,300
31.	1 April	Celtic	A	2–2	Davidson, Sullivan	24,000
32.	4 April	Partick Thistle	H	2–1	Harper (2)	16,000
33.	8 April	Partick Thistle	A	2–0	Harper, McMaster	9,000
34.	15 April	Motherwell	A	5–0	Jarvie (2), Davidson (2), Harper	16,280
35.	22 April	St Mirren	H	4–2	Harper (3), Miller	17,250
36.	29 April	Hibernian	A	1–1	Scanlon	11,250

==== Final standings ====
Pos	Team	Pld	W	D	L	GF	GA	GD	Pts	Qualification or relegation
1	Rangers (C)	36	24	7	5	76	39	+37	55	Qualification for the European Cup first round
2	Aberdeen	36	22	9	5	68	29	+39	53	Qualification for the Cup Winners' Cup first round
3	Dundee United	36	16	8	12	42	32	+10	40	Qualification for the UEFA Cup first round
4	Hibernian	36	15	7	14	51	43	+8	37	Qualification for the UEFA Cup first round
5	Celtic	36	15	6	15	63	54	+9	36	

Source: Statto
Rules for classification: 1) points; 2) goal difference; 3) number of goals scored.
(C) Champions

=== Scottish League Cup ===
Round	Date	Opponent	H/A	Score	Aberdeen Scorer(s)	Attendance
R1 L1	17 August	Airdrieonians	H	3–1	Fleming (2), Shirra	10,600
R1 L2	24 August	Airdrieonians	A	2–0	McMaster (2)	2,500
R2 L1	31 August	Cowdenbeath	H	5–0	Harper(3), Fleming (2)	8,250
R2 L2	3 September	Cowdenbeath	A	5–0	Harper(3), Davidson, McMaster	1,780
R3 L1	5 October	Rangers	A	1–6	Davidson	25,000
R3 L2	26 October	Rangers	H	3–1	Jarvie (2), Smith	15,600

=== Scottish Cup ===
Round	Date	Opponent	H/A	Score	Aberdeen Scorer(s)	Attendance
R3	6 February	Ayr United	H	2–0	Harper(2)	14,244
R4	27 February	St Johnstone	H	3–0	Davidson, Harper, Jarvie	15,597
QF	11 March	Morton	H	2–2	Davidson, Jarvie	17,394
QFR	15 March	Morton	A	2–1	Fleming, McMaster	10,500
SF	12 April	Partick Thistle	N	4–2	Fleming (3), Harper	12,282
Final	6 May	Rangers	N	1–2	Ritchie	61,563

=== UEFA Cup ===
Round	Date	Opponent	H/A	Score	Aberdeen Scorer(s)	Attendance
R1 L1	14 September	(Belgium) R.W.D. Molenbeek	A	0–0		14,000
R1 L2	28 September	(Belgium) R.W.D. Molenbeek	H	1–2	Jarvie	26,000

== Squad ==
=== Appearances & Goals ===
No.	Pos	Nat	Player	Total		Premier Division		Scottish Cup		League Cup		UEFA Cup	
No.	Pos	Nat	Player	Apps	Goals	Apps	Goals	Apps	Goals	Apps	Goals	Apps	Goals
	GK	(Scotland) SCO	Bobby Clark	50	0	36	0	6	0	6	0	2	0
	GK	(Scotland) SCO	Ally McLean	0	0	0	0	0	0	0	0	0	0
	GK	(Scotland) SCO	John Gardiner	0	0	0	0	0	0	0	0	0	0
	GK	(Scotland) SCO	Jim Leighton	0	0	0	0	0	0	0	0	0	0
	DF	(Scotland) SCO	Willie Miller (c)	50	2	36	2	6	0	6	0	2	0
	DF	(Scotland) SCO	Willie Garner	49	1	35	1	6	0	6	0	2	0
	DF	(Scotland) SCO	Stuart Kennedy	48	0	34	0	6	0	6	0	2	0
	DF	(Scotland) SCO	Chic McLelland	38	0	25	0	5	0	6	0	2	0
	DF	(Scotland) SCO	Steve Ritchie	11	1	9	0	2	1	0	0	0	0
	DF	(Scotland) SCO	Bobby Glennie	3	0	3	0	0	0	0	0	0	0
	DF	(Scotland) SCO	Doug Rougvie	1	0	1	0	0	0	0	0	0	0
	DF	(Scotland) SCO	Neil Cooper	1	0	1	0	0	0	0	0	0	0
	DF	(Scotland) SCO	Alex McLeish	1	0	1	0	0	0	0	0	0	0
	DF	(Scotland) SCO	David Scott	0	0	0	0	0	0	0	0	0	0
	MF	(Scotland) SCO	John McMaster	45	8	32	4	6	1	5	3	2	0
	MF	(Scotland) SCO	Dom Sullivan	39	3	29	3	6	0	3	0	1	0
	MF	(Scotland) SCO	Gordon Strachan	16	1	12	1	4	0	0	0	0	0
	MF	(Scotland) SCO	Jim Shirra	15	1	8	0	0	0	5	1	2	0
	MF	(Scotland) SCO	Joe Smith	10	1	7	0	0	0	3	1	0	0
	MF	(Scotland) SCO	Ian Scanlon	2	1	1	1	1	0	0	0	0	0
	MF	(Scotland) SCO	Alex Grant	2	0	2	0	0	0	0	0	0	0
	MF	(Scotland) SCO	George Campbell	1	0	1	0	0	0	0	0	0	0
	MF	(Scotland) SCO	Andy Watson	1	0	1	0	0	0	0	0	0	0
	FW	(Scotland) SCO	Drew Jarvie	49	17	35	12	6	2	6	2	2	1
	FW	(Scotland) SCO	Joe Harper	43	27	31	17	4	4	6	6	2	0
	FW	(Scotland) SCO	Ian Fleming	38	12	25	5	5	4	6	3	2	0
	FW	(Scotland) SCO	Duncan Davidson	38	12	24	8	6	2	6	2	2	0
	FW	(Scotland) SCO	Dave Robb	14	5	13	5	0	0	1	0	0	0
	FW	(Scotland) SCO	Steve Archibald	10	5	10	5	0	0	0	0	0	0
	FW	(Scotland) SCO	Ian Gibson	10	3	9	3	1	0	0	0	0	0
	FW	(Scotland) SCO	Jocky Scott	1	0	1	0	0	0	0	0	0	0
	FW	(Scotland) SCO	Doug Brown	0	0	0	0	0	0	0	0	0	0
	FW	(Scotland) SCO	John Clark	0	0	0	0	0	0	0	0	0	0
