= Andy Watson (footballer, born 1959) =

Scottish footballer and coach

Personal information
- Full name: Andrew Watson
- Date of birth: 3 September 1959 (age 67)
- Place of birth: Aberdeen, Scotland
- Height: 5 ft 10 in (1.78 m)
- Position: Midfielder

Youth career
- Sunnyside B.C.
- 1976–1979: Aberdeen

Senior career*
Years	Team	Apps	(Gls)
1978–1983	Aberdeen	99	(13)
1983–1984	Leeds United	38	(7)
1984–1987	Heart of Midlothian	57	(6)
1987–1989	Hibernian	31	(3)
Total		225	(29)

International career
1980–1982	Scotland U21	4	(1)

Managerial career
- 2015–2016: Ilkeston
- * Club domestic league appearances and goals

Andrew Watson (born 3 September 1959) is a Scottish former professional footballer and coach.

During his playing career, Aberdeen-born Watson had spells at Aberdeen, Leeds United, Heart of Midlothian and Hibernian. As a coach, he has worked with clubs in Scotland and England, and has been part of the Scotland national team management setup in two separate spells.

== Career ==
=== Player ===
Beginning his professional career with his hometown club Aberdeen under manager Alex Ferguson, Watson was a winner of the 1979–80 Scottish Premier Division title and the 1982–83 Scottish Cup, and was also an unused substitute in the 1983 European Cup Winners' Cup Final victory. However he was never a regular starter in that strong Dons team and left the club at the end of that season.

Watson joined Leeds United for a fee of £60,000, brought to the club by Scottish manager Eddie Gray, and was a starting player at Elland Road in his one full season in England's second tier. As the following campaign unfolded he again found himself on the bench and decided to move on. After his spell in Yorkshire, he returned to Scotland and signed for Hearts in a £70,000 transfer; at the Tynecastle club he was part of the squad which came within minutes of winning the 1985–86 Scottish Premier Division. He took no part in that season's Scottish Cup Final defeat.

He switched across Edinburgh to city rivals Hibernian for £30,000, where he featured regularly for one season at Easter Road before he was forced to retire through injury aged just 29.

=== Coach ===
He joined the coaching staff at Hibs under Alex Miller and was persuaded by Alex McLeish, his former teammate at Aberdeen, to be his assistant at Motherwell in 1994. He later re-joined McLeish in moving to Hibernian and Rangers, where he was assistant manager until the end of the 2005–06 season.

From January 2007 he was one of McLeish's assistants with the Scotland national side, and in November 2007 followed McLeish when the latter was appointed manager of Birmingham City. On 21 May 2013 Watson was appointed first team coach at Notts County, but he was sacked on 27 October 2013, along with manager Chris Kiwomya.

Watson joined Northern Premier Division side Ilkeston FC during the 2015 close season as an assistant head coach and technical director, working with head coach Gavin Strachan. After Strachan left the club in October 2015, Watson was appointed head coach. In October 2016, he was appointed as assistant coach to Gordon Strachan (father of Gavin and another former Aberdeen teammate in the 1980s) at the Scotland national team alongside fellow coaches Mark McGhee and Gary McAllister, after the departure of Stuart McCall.

== Career statistics ==
=== Club ===
Appearances and goals by club, season and competition
Club	Seasons	League			National Cup		League Cup		Europe		Total	
Club	Seasons	Division	Apps	Goals	Apps	Goals	Apps	Goals	Apps	Goals	Apps	Goals
Aberdeen	1977–78	Scottish Premier Division	1	0	0	0	0	0	0	0	1	0
Aberdeen	1978–79	Scottish Premier Division	2	0	1	0	0	0	0	0	3	0
Aberdeen	1979–80	Scottish Premier Division	17	5	3	0	0	0	0	0	20	5
Aberdeen	1980–81	Scottish Premier Division	30	0	2	0	5	2	4	0	41	2
Aberdeen	1981–82	Scottish Premier Division	30	6	2	0	6	0	6	1	44	7
Aberdeen	1982–83	Scottish Premier Division	19	2	3	1	2	0	2	0	26	3
Aberdeen	Total		99	13	11	1	13	2	12	1	135	17
Leeds United	1983–84	Second Division	31	7	1	0	4	0	0	0	36	7
Leeds United	1984–85	Second Division	7	0	0	0	0	0	0	0	7	0
Leeds United	Total		38	7	1	0	4	0	0	0	43	7
Heart of Midlothian	1984–85	Scottish Premier Division	16	3	5	0	0	0	0	0	21	3
Heart of Midlothian	1985–86	Scottish Premier Division	12	0	1	0	3	0	0	0	16	0
Heart of Midlothian	1986–87	Scottish Premier Division	29	3	6	0	1	0	2	0	38	3
Heart of Midlothian	1987–88	Scottish Premier Division	0	0	0	0	0	0	0	0	0	0
Heart of Midlothian	Total		57	6	12	0	4	0	2	0	75	6
Hibernian	1987–88	Scottish Premier Division	30	3	1	0	1	0	0	0	32	3
Hibernian	1988–89	Scottish Premier Division	1	0	0	0	0	0	0	0	1	0
Hibernian	Total		31	3	1	0	1	0	0	0	33	3
Career total			225	29	25	1	22	2	14	1	286	33
