= Willie Garner =

Scottish footballer & manager (born 1955)

Personal information
- Full name: William Garner
- Date of birth: 24 July 1955 (age 71)
- Place of birth: Stirling, Scotland
- Position: Defender

Youth career
- –1975: Campsie Black Watch

Senior career*
Years	Team	Apps	(Gls)
1975–1981	Aberdeen	113	(1)
1981–1982	Celtic	1	(0)
1981–1982	→ Alloa Athletic (loan)	7	(1)
1982–1983	→ Rochdale (loan)	4	(0)
1982–1984	Alloa Athletic	48	(6)
1984–1986	Aberdeen	0	(0)
1986–1987	Cove Rangers		
1987–1988	Rosslyn Sport		
1988–1990	Keith		
1990	Stoneywood		
1990–1992	Berwick Rangers	47	(1)
1992–1995	Craigroyston		
1995–1997	Newtongrange Star		
Total		221	(9)

Managerial career
- 1982–1984: Alloa Athletic (player-manager)
- 1984–1986: Aberdeen (player-assistant)
- 1988–1990: Keith (player-manager)
- 1992–1995: Craigroyston (player-manager)
- 1995–1999: Newtongrange Star (player-manager)
- 2000–2002: Harthill Royal
- 2005–2006: Glenrothes
- 2008–2011: Tayport
- 2014: Ballingry Rovers
- * Club domestic league appearances and goals

William Garner (born 24 July 1955), also known as Willie Garner, is a Scottish former footballer best known for playing for Aberdeen. He is now a manager, mainly of clubs in the junior ranks of Scottish football.

== Career ==
Garner was born in Stirling and raised in Denny; he was a Celtic supporter in childhood. He signed for Aberdeen from Campsie Black Watch in 1975, and was part of the team which won the Scottish League Cup in 1976 and the Scottish Premier Division in 1980, although a broken leg suffered in 1978 had allowed teenager Alex McLeish the opportunity to take the starting place. Garner left Aberdeen in 1981 to join Celtic, but the move was a disappointment for all concerned: he only played two first team games, scored two own goals on his debut and fell behind the emerging David Moyes in the backup list.

He joined Alloa Athletic in 1982 as player-manager aged 27, before returning to Aberdeen in February 1984 to become assistant manager to Alex Ferguson. After two years as Ferguson's number two, during which the club won five major honours, he played for a number of Highland League and Junior clubs before signing for Berwick Rangers, where he remained for two years before retiring in 1992.

Garner was manager of Scottish Junior Football Association, East Region side Ballingry Rovers between October and November 2014, when they folded after 62 years in existence.

== Career statistics ==
=== Appearances and goals by club, season and competition ===
Appearances and goals by club, season and competition
Club	Seasons	League			National Cup		League Cup		Europe		Total	
Club	Seasons	Division	Apps	Goals	Apps	Goals	Apps	Goals	Apps	Goals	Apps	Goals
Aberdeen	1975–76	Scottish Premier Division	8	0	1	0	0	0	0	0	9	0
Aberdeen	1976–77	Scottish Premier Division	36	0	3	0	11	0	0	0	50	0
Aberdeen	1977–78	Scottish Premier Division	35	1	6	0	6	0	2	0	49	1
Aberdeen	1978–79	Scottish Premier Division	12	0	0	0	2	0	1	0	15	0
Aberdeen	1979–80	Scottish Premier Division	20	0	1	0	11	2	2	0	34	2
Aberdeen	1980–81	Scottish Premier Division	2	0	0	0	1	0	1	0	4	0
Aberdeen	Total		113	1	11	0	31	2	6	0	161	3
Celtic	1981-82	Scottish Premier Division	1	0	0	0	2	0	0	0	3	0
Celtic	1982-83	Scottish Premier Division	0	0	0	0	0	0	0	0	0	0
Celtic	Total		1	0	0	0	2	0	0	0	3	0
Rochdale (loan)	1982-83	Fourth Division	4	0	0	0	1	0	-	-	5	0

== Honours ==
Aberdeen

- Scottish Premier Division: 1979–80
- Scottish League Cup: 1976–77
  - Runner-up 1979–80
- Scottish Cup: runner-up 1977–78
