= 1983 European Cup Winners' Cup final =

- Match programme cover
- Event: 1982–83 European Cup Winners' Cup
Aberdeen	Real Madrid
(Scotland)	(Spain)
2	1
- After extra time
- Date: 11 May 1983
- Venue: Nya Ullevi, Gothenburg
- Referee: Gianfranco Menegali (Italy)
- Attendance: 17,804

The 1983 European Cup Winners' Cup Final was a football match contested between Aberdeen of Scotland and Real Madrid of Spain. It was the final match of the 1982–83 European Cup Winners' Cup tournament and the 23rd European Cup Winners' Cup final, a football tournament contested by the winners of each qualifying nation's national cup.

Aberdeen played one more round than Real Madrid as they were required to play in a preliminary round prior to the first round proper. Matches until the final were held over two legs, whereas the final itself was a single match at a neutral venue. The final was held at Nya Ullevi in Gothenburg, Sweden.

Watched by a crowd of 17,804, Aberdeen took the lead early in the first half with a goal by Eric Black, but Madrid drew level following a penalty scored by Juanito in the fifteenth minute. At the end of normal time, the match remained at 1–1. The match went into extra time, with the winning goal scored for Aberdeen by John Hewitt in the 112th minute. Aberdeen won the match 2–1 and won their first European trophy. This would be both clubs' last Cup Winners' Cup final; as the competition was folded in 1999, Real Madrid – which by then had already won six European Cups and would win two UEFA Cups later that decade – will never achieve the record of winning all three pre-1999 major European trophies (European Cup/Champions League, UEFA Cup/Europa League and the Cup Winners' Cup). Aberdeen remain the most recent team to defeat Real Madrid in a European final.

== Route to the final ==
(Scotland) Aberdeen					(Spain) Real Madrid			
Opponent	Agg.	1st leg	2nd leg		Opponent	Agg.	1st leg	2nd leg
(Switzerland) Sion	11–1	7–0 (H)	4–1 (A)	Prel. round	Bye			
(Albania) Dinamo Tirana	1–0	1–0 (H)	0–0 (A)	First round	(Romania) Baia Mare	5–2	0–0 (A)	5–2 (H)
(Poland) Lech Poznań	3–0	2–0 (H)	1–0 (A)	Second round	(Hungary) Újpesti Dózsa	4–1	3–1 (H)	1–0 (A)
(West Germany) Bayern Munich	3–2	0–0 (A)	3–2 (H)	Quarter-finals	(Italy) Inter Milan	3–2	1–1 (A)	2–1 (H)
(Belgium) Waterschei Thor	5–2	5–1 (H)	0–1 (A)	Semi-finals	Austria Wien	5–3	2–2 (A)	3–1 (H)

=== Aberdeen ===
Aberdeen qualified for the 1982–83 European Cup Winners' Cup after they defeated Rangers 4–1 in the 1982 Scottish Cup Final on 22 May 1982. They began their European Cup Winners' Cup campaign against Swiss team Sion, with a home game at Pittodrie Stadium on 18 August 1982. Eric Black scored in the first minute of the game, and Aberdeen went on to win 7–0. The return match was played on 1 September 1982. Aberdeen were drawn against Dinamo Tirana from Albania in the first round proper. The first leg was played at home once again, and the Scottish team won 1–0. The return leg resulted in a goalless draw, sending Aberdeen through.

In the third round, Aberdeen were drawn against Lech Poznań from Poland. They won 2–0 at home in the first leg, which was followed by a 1–0 win away. In the quarter-finals, they were drawn against Bayern Munich. In the first leg, played at the Olympic Stadium in Munich, the two clubs were held to a 0–0 draw. In the return game in Scotland, Aberdeen went through with a 3–2 victory. Aberdeen played Waterschei Thor, who had defeated Paris Saint-Germain in the quarter-finals. Aberdeen won 5–1 at home, but lost 1–0 away in Belgium for an aggregate win of 5–2.

=== Real Madrid ===
Real Madrid automatically qualified for the first round, where they drew 0–0 away in their first match against Romanian team Baia Mare. Madrid won the return match at home 5–2. Their second round opponents were also from eastern Europe, Újpesti Dózsa, this time from Hungary. Madrid won both legs, first 3–1 at home and then 1–0 away. Their quarter-final opponents were Internazionale. After the first leg at the San Siro resulted in a 1–1 draw, Madrid won 2–1 at home at the Santiago Bernabéu Stadium. Madrid were drawn against Austria Wien in the semi-final. Austria had knocked out Barcelona in the quarter-finals, who were the reigning champions of the European Cup Winners' Cup. The two teams drew 2–2 during the first leg in Vienna, and Madrid qualified for the final with a 3–1 victory at home on 20 April.

== Background ==
Real Madrid had extensive experience in European competitions. They had previously made it to the final of the European Cup Winners' Cup in 1971 against English club Chelsea. The match was a 1–1 draw after extra time, with Chelsea winning 2–1 in the replay. They had more success in the European Cup, having won the competition during its inaugural year in 1956, and retained the trophy for the following four seasons. Their most recent European success had come in the 1965–66 European Cup, where they defeated Partizan Belgrade.

The 1983 European Cup Winners' Cup was the first European final in which Aberdeen had appeared. Only two clubs from Scotland had previously won European trophies, Celtic and Rangers. Prior to the match, some of Aberdeen's supporters travelled to Gothenburg by fishing boat from Scotland, whilst others slept on the streets next to the stadium. Real Madrid player Uli Stielike was recovering from a thigh injury prior to the match, but was cleared by the club's doctors. Likewise, Aberdeen's Eric Black was declared fit to play for this match after being injured for a month. Aberdeen full-back Stuart Kennedy was named as a substitute, despite being injured in the Semi-Final and unable to play, as a mark of respect from Alex Ferguson. Kennedy's injury proved to be so severe that he never played professionally again.

== Match ==
=== Summary ===
==== First half ====
Prior to the match, the pitch had been covered by tarpaulin in order to protect it from the rain. The referee made an inspection of the pitch prior to kick-off and determined that the surface was fit to play upon. The match started, and Aberdeen immediately went on the attack. Madrid's goalkeeper Agustín misdirected a goal kick, Gordon Strachan broke away from his marker and chested the ball down. He lobbed the ball forward to Eric Black who hit a twenty-yard volley towards the Madrid goal. Agustín saved the shot, tipping it onto the crossbar of the goalframe. Strachan took the corner, crossing it to Alex McLeish. The ball deflected off McLeish's head, and Black pounced on the ball sending it into the back of the Real Madrid goal to put Aberdeen up 1–0.

The conditions on the pitch started to get muddy very quickly, which partially resulted in Madrid's comeback. Alex McLeish of Aberdeen passed the ball back to goalkeeper Jim Leighton, but it became stuck in the mud part way in the penalty area. Leighton rushed out from the goal line to claim the ball but took down Madrid striker Santillana in the process. A penalty was awarded by the referee. Real's captain Juanito scored the penalty to put Madrid level. Madrid dominated the remainder of the half, with John Metgod and Uli Stielike looking particularly comfortable in defence and midfield, respectively.

==== Second half ====
The teams were equally matched during the first part of the second half. Strachan led another Aberdeen attack in the 55th minute, passing it to Peter Weir who took the ball down the flank. His cross back to Strachan was met by a volley, but it deflected off Agustín's legs. Aberdeen immediately attacked once more, with Weir moving again down the flank, but his cross was met with a header by Black who sent the ball over after already moving into an offside position. In the 80th minute, Weir created another opening with a further cross. This time it was caught by Agustín. The goalkeeper momentarily dropped the ball, but dived onto it before any Aberdeen players could take advantage of the mistake.

==== Extra time ====
Normal time finished at 1–1, sending the match into extra time. The winning goal came in the 112th minute. Weir passed the ball to Mark McGhee, who took the ball down the left wing. He crossed it into the box towards substitute John Hewitt. He threw himself into the path of the ball and connected with a glancing header to put Aberdeen ahead once more.

==== Details ====
11 May 1983
20:15 CEST

Aberdeen (Scotland)	2–1 (a.e.t.)	(Spain) Real Madrid
Black 7'; Hewitt 112'	Report	Juanito 14' (pen.)

Nya Ullevi, Gothenburg
Attendance: 17,804
Referee: Gianfranco Menegali (Italy)

Aberdeen	Real Madrid

GK	1	(Scotland) Jim Leighton
RB	2	(Scotland) Doug Rougvie
CB	5	(Scotland) Alex McLeish
CB	6	(Scotland) Willie Miller (c)
LB	3	(Scotland) John McMaster
RM	4	(Scotland) Neale Cooper
CM	7	(Scotland) Gordon Strachan
CM	8	(Scotland) Neil Simpson
LM	11	(Scotland) Peter Weir
CF	10	(Scotland) Eric Black	(substituted off) 87'
CF	9	(Scotland) Mark McGhee
Substitutes:
DF	12	(Scotland) Stuart Kennedy
GK	13	(Scotland) Bryan Gunn
MF	14	(Scotland) Andy Watson
FW	15	(Scotland) John Hewitt	(substituted on) 87'
MF	16	(Scotland) Ian Angus
Manager:
(Scotland) Alex Ferguson

GK	1	(Spain) Agustín
RB	2	(Spain) Juan José
CB	4	(Netherlands) John Metgod
CB	5	(Spain) Paco Bonet
LB	3	(Spain) José Antonio Camacho		(substituted off) 91'
RM	8	(Spain) Ángel
CM	6	(Spain) Ricardo Gallego	(yellow card) 98'
CM	10	(West Germany) Uli Stielike
LM	11	(Spain) Isidro		(substituted off) 103'
CF	7	(Spain) Juanito
CF	9	(Spain) Santillana (c)
Substitutes:
DF	12	(Spain) José Antonio Salguero		(substituted on) 103'
GK	13	(Spain) Miguel Ángel
DF	14	(Spain) Isidoro San José		(substituted on) 91'
MF	15	(Spain) Francisco García Hernández
FW	16	(Spain) Ito
Manager:
(Argentina) (Spain) Alfredo Di Stéfano

Match rules

- 90 minutes.
- 30 minutes of extra time if necessary.
- Penalty shoot-out if score still tied.
- Five named substitutes.
- Maximum of two substitutions.

== Post-match ==
The local police reported that only five arrests were made of fans for being drunk and disorderly. Nils Klintenberg, the police commander, said "There were no problems. We were pleased to have them here." One Aberdeen supporter collapsed following the first goal and died.

After the game legendary Madrid coach Alfredo Di Stéfano conceded the better team had won and commented; "Aberdeen have what money can't buy; a soul, a team spirit built in a family tradition."

The European Cup Winners' Cup was run until 1999, with Aberdeen's success in the 1983 final being the last time that a Scottish club lifted the trophy. Real Madrid ultimately never won the competition, nor did they ever reach the final again. As of 2025, this match remains the last time Real Madrid have lost in any final of a European tournament. With their victory, Aberdeen qualified for the 1983 European Super Cup, where they played 1983 European Cup champions Hamburg. The first leg in Hamburg was a goalless draw, with Aberdeen winning the second leg 2–0.

== See also ==
- 1982–83 European Cup Winners' Cup
- 1983 European Cup Final
- 1983 UEFA Cup Final
- Aberdeen F.C. in European football
- Real Madrid CF in international football competitions
