= Ian Scanlon =

Scottish footballer

Personal information
- Full name: John Scanlon
- Date of birth: 13 July 1952 (age 74)
- Place of birth: Birkenshaw, Scotland
- Height: 5 ft 8 in (1.73 m)
- Position: Winger

Youth career
- Viewpark Boys Guild

Senior career*
Years	Team	Apps	(Gls)
1970–1972	East Stirlingshire	42	(18)
1972–1977	Notts County	111	(31)
1977–1981	Aberdeen	92	(12)
1981–1986	St Mirren	98	(28)
Total		343	(89)
- * Club domestic league appearances and goals

John "Ian" Scanlon (13 July 1952) is a Scottish former professional footballer. During his playing career Scanlon represented East Stirlingshire, Aberdeen, St Mirren and English club Notts County.

== Career ==
Scanlon moved from East Stirlingshire to Notts County for a fee of £10,000. In November 1974 he scored a hat-trick against Sheffield Wednesday, taking 165 seconds from the first to the third goal, a club record. In 1977, after being dropped for a game against Carlisle United, Scanlon walked out on Notts County. After openly considering retirement from football, and making false claims to have inherited money, he joined Aberdeen. Scanlon won the Scottish Football League Premier Division with Aberdeen in 1979–80, before being sold to St Mirren in part exchange for Peter Weir. He played 140 games for the Saints, scoring 40 goals, including competing in the UEFA Cup in 1983–84 and 1985–86 before retiring in May 1986.

== Career statistics ==
Appearances and goals by club, season and competition
Club	Seasons	League			Scottish Cup		League Cup		Europe		Total	
Club	Seasons	Division	Apps	Goals	Apps	Goals	Apps	Goals	Apps	Goals	Apps	Goals
Aberdeen	1977-78	Scottish Premier Division	1	1	1	0	0	0	0	0	2	1
Aberdeen	1978-79	Scottish Premier Division	29	2	5	2	6	2	4	0	44	6
Aberdeen	1979-80	Scottish Premier Division	29	4	4	4	7	0	2	0	42	8
Aberdeen	1980-81	Scottish Premier Division	33	5	1	0	5	0	4	0	43	5
Aberdeen	Total		92	12	11	6	18	2	10	0	131	20
St Mirren	1981-82	Scottish Premier Division	-	-	-	-	-	-	-	-	-	-
St Mirren	1982-83	Scottish Premier Division	-	-	-	-	-	-	-	-	-	-
St Mirren	1983-84	Scottish Premier Division	-	-	-	-	-	-	-	-	-	-
St Mirren	1984-85	Scottish Premier Division	-	-	-	-	-	-	-	-	-	-
St Mirren	1985-86	Scottish Premier Division	-	-	-	-	-	-	-	-	-	-
St Mirren	Total		98	28	-	-	-	-	-	-	140	40

== Honours ==
With Aberdeen:

- Scottish Football League Premier Division
  - Winner - 1979–80
- Scottish Cup
  - Runner-up - 1978
- Scottish League Cup
  - Runner-up - 1979–80
