= John McMaster (footballer, born 1955) =

Scottish footballer

Personal information
- Date of birth: 23 February 1955 (age 71)
- Place of birth: Greenock, Scotland
- Height: 1.74 m (5 ft 9 in)
- Position: Midfielder

Senior career*
Years	Team	Apps	(Gls)
- Port Glasgow
1972–1987	Aberdeen	204	(20)
1972–1973	→ Peterhead (loan)		
1987–1988	Morton	29	(2)
Total		233	(22)
- * Club domestic league appearances and goals

John McMaster (born 23 February 1955) is a Scottish former professional footballer who played for the bulk of his career with Aberdeen.

McMaster made 316 appearances (47 as substitute) and scored 20 goals for Aberdeen and secured multiple winners medals between 1974 and 1986, including the European Cup Winners' Cup in 1983, two Scottish League titles and three Scottish Cups.

McMaster was badly injured against Liverpool in the European Cup a month later which kept him out of the game for a year.

In 1987, he signed for his hometown club Morton before retiring to become assistant manager of the club, during which he developed several players including future Aberdeen manager Derek McInnes. He has since worked as a scout for Swansea City in the west of Scotland.

In November 2017, he was one of four inductees into the Aberdeen Hall of Fame.

== Career statistics ==
Appearances and goals by club, season and competition
Club	Seasons	League			Scottish Cup		League Cup		Europe		Total	
Club	Seasons	Division	Apps	Goals	Apps	Goals	Apps	Goals	Apps	Goals	Apps	Goals
Aberdeen	1972-73	Scottish Division One	0	0	0	0	0	0	0	0	0	0
Aberdeen	1973-74	Scottish Division One	0	0	0	0	0	0	0	0	0	0
Aberdeen	1974-75	Scottish Division One	1	0	0	0	2	0	0	0	3	0
Aberdeen	1975-76	Scottish Premier Division	21	3	2	1	1	0	0	0	24	4
Aberdeen	1976-77	Scottish Premier Division	2	0	0	0	3	0	0	0	5	0
Aberdeen	1977-78	Scottish Premier Division	32	4	6	1	5	3	2	0	45	8
Aberdeen	1978-79	Scottish Premier Division	27	3	4	1	7	0	4	0	42	4
Aberdeen	1979-80	Scottish Premier Division	34	4	5	1	11	4	2	0	52	9
Aberdeen	1980-81	Scottish Premier Division	10	2	0	0	4	1	3	0	17	3
Aberdeen	1981-82	Scottish Premier Division	31	1	6	0	8	1	4	0	49	2
Aberdeen	1982-83	Scottish Premier Division	24	2	2	0	6	0	9	0	41	2
Aberdeen	1983-84	Scottish Premier Division	12	0	2	0	7	0	4	0	25	0
Aberdeen	1984-85	Scottish Premier Division	1	0	0	0	0	0	0	0	1	0
Aberdeen	1985-86	Scottish Premier Division	7	1	2	0	0	0	0	0	9	1
Aberdeen	1986-87	Scottish Premier Division	2	0	0	0	0	0	0	0	2	0
Aberdeen	Total		204	20	29	4	54	9	28	0	315	33
Peterhead (loan)	1972-73	Highland League	-	-	-	-	-	-	-	-	-	-
Greenock Morton	1986-87	Scottish First Division	9	0	0	0	0	0	-	-	9	0
Greenock Morton	1987-88	Scottish Premier Division	20	2	0	0	1	0	0	0	21	2
Greenock Morton	Total		29	2	0	0	1	0	0	0	30	2
Career total			233+	22+	29+	4+	55	9	28	0	345+	35+

== Honours ==
=== Player ===
Aberdeen

- European Cup Winners' Cup: 1982–83
- European Super Cup: 1983
- Scottish Premier Division: 1979–80, 1983–84, 1985–86
- Scottish Cup: 1981–82, 1982–83, 1985–86
- Drybrough Cup: 1980–81
- Scottish League Cup:Runners Up: 1978–79, 1979–80
