= Marc De Clerck =

Belgian footballer

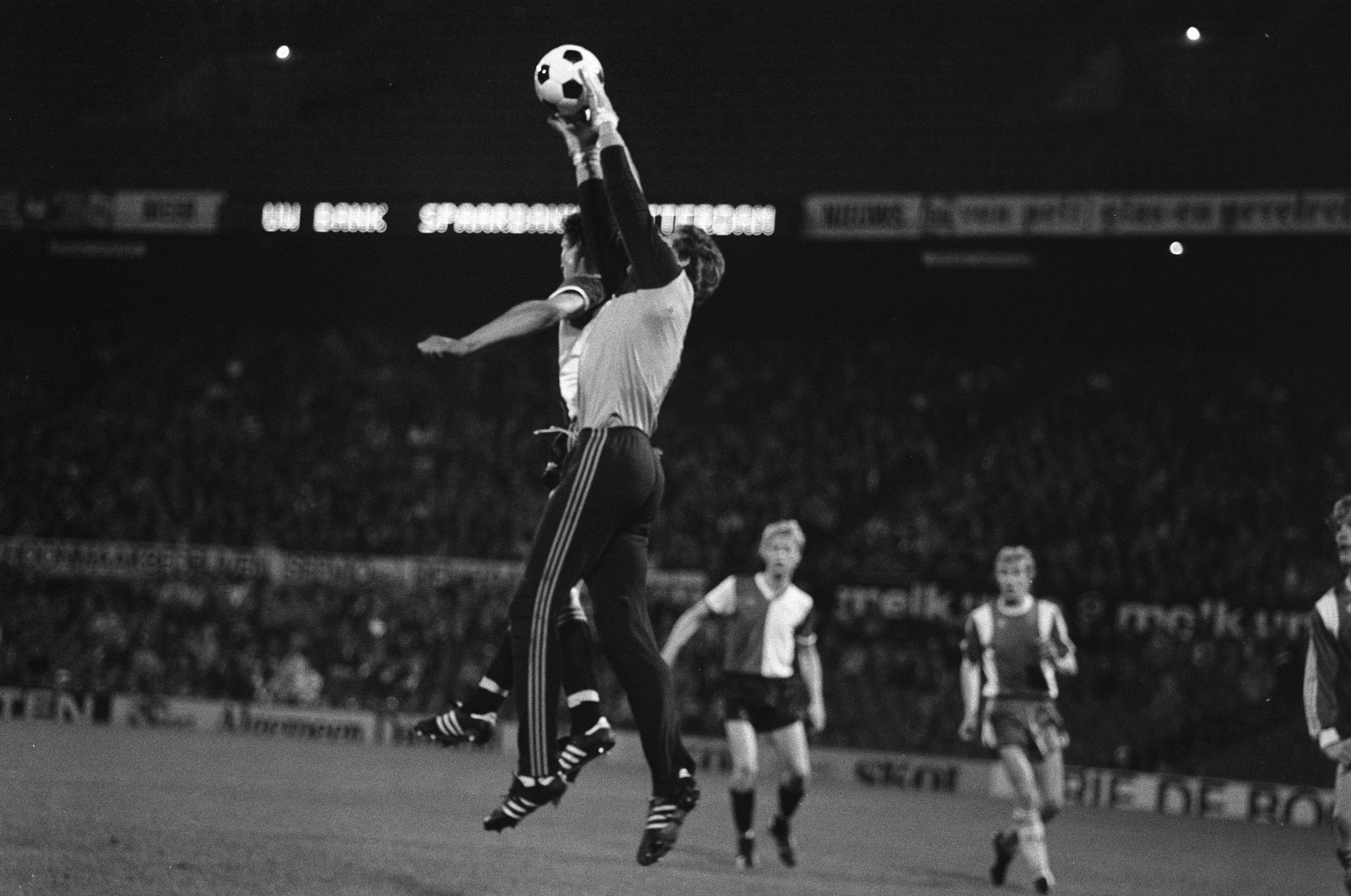
- Marc De Clerck (right) playing against Feyenoord in 1979

Personal information
- Full name: Marc De Clerck
- Date of birth: 27 December 1949 (age 76)
- Place of birth: Belgium
- Position: Goalkeeper

Senior career*
Years	Team	Apps	(Gls)
1970–1974	Ghent		
1974–1976	FC Twente		
1976–1979	SC Heracles		
1979–1980	Go Ahead Eagles		
1980–1981	Aberdeen	1	(0)
1981–1982	SC Heracles		
1982–1983	De Graafschap		

Managerial career
- KRC Gent-Zeehaven
- * Club domestic league appearances and goals

Marc De Clerck (born 27 December 1949) is a Belgian former footballer, who played as a goalkeeper for Ghent, FC Twente, Go Ahead Eagles, Aberdeen and SC Heracles.

De Clerck made his professional debut in season 1970/71 for Ghent. In the summer of 1974 he signed for FC Twente, but then moved to SC Heracles in 1976. After three seasons with SC Heracles, he moved to Go Ahead Eagles for the 1979–80 season.

In August 1980, De Clerck signed for Aberdeen in the Scottish Premier Division. In his debut for the club, a Scottish League Cup tie against Berwick Rangers, he scored a goal from a long clearance. He injured his ankle in his next game, a league match against Kilmarnock, and failed to regain his place in the side on regaining his fitness. After one year in Scotland, De Clerck moved back to Heracles on a free transfer. He later played for De Graafschap and Belgian club KRC Harelbeke before retiring as a player.

De Clerck later managed KRC Gent-Zeehaven.

== See also ==
- List of goalscoring goalkeepers
