= Stuart Kennedy =

Scottish footballer

Personal information
- Full name: Stuart Robert Kennedy
- Date of birth: 31 May 1953 (age 73)
- Place of birth: Grangemouth, Scotland
- Height: 1.74 m (5 ft 9 in)
- Position: Right-back

Senior career*
Years	Team	Apps	(Gls)
1971–1976	Falkirk	110	(1)
1976–1983	Aberdeen	223	(3)
Total		333	(4)

International career
1978–1981	Scotland	8	(0)
- * Club domestic league appearances and goals

Stuart Robert Kennedy (born 31 May 1953) is a Scottish former footballer who played as a right-back for Falkirk and Aberdeen. He made eight appearances for the Scotland national team.

== Club career ==
Kennedy was born in Grangemouth. He moved to Aberdeen in 1976 for £30,000 and featured prominently in Aberdeen's greatest period of success. A hard-working, skilful player, he won every major domestic honour in his time in the North-East, namely the League in 1979–80, the Scottish Cup in 1981–82, and the 1976–77 League Cup.

During the second leg of the European Cup Winners' Cup semi-final in 1983, Kennedy picked up a serious knee injury after catching his studs at the edge of the pitch. Having played in every game of Aberdeen's European campaign up to then, he was forced to watch from the dugout when his colleagues faced Real Madrid in the final in Gothenburg, Sweden. The Dons lifted the trophy after a 2–1 victory over the Spanish giants. Kennedy earned himself a place on the substitutes bench, despite being unable to play, thanks to an act of respect from his coach Alex Ferguson. The injury proved so serious that he never played professionally again.

== International career ==
Kennedy was selected in the Scotland squad for the 1978 World Cup, where he played in the games against Peru and the Netherlands. He received eight caps in total in his three-year international career between 1978 and 1981.

== Life after football ==
Since retiring, he has worked mainly as a publican in Falkirk.

== Career statistics ==
=== Club ===
Appearances and goals by club, season and competition
Club	Season	League			Scottish Cup		League Cup		Europe		Total	
Club	Season	Division	Apps	Goals	Apps	Goals	Apps	Goals	Apps	Goals	Apps	Goals
Falkirk	1971–72	Scottish Division One	1	0	0	0	0	0	0	0	1	0
Falkirk	1972–73	Scottish Division One	34	0	2	0	8	0	0	0	44	0
Falkirk	1973–74	Scottish Division One	13	0	0	0	6	0	0	0	19	0
Falkirk	1974–75	Scottish Division Two	36	1	2	1	11	1	-	-	49	3
Falkirk	1975–76	Scottish First Division	26	0	2	0	6	0	-	-	34	0
Falkirk	Total		110	1	6	1	31	1	-	-	147	3
Aberdeen	1976–77	Scottish Premier Division	32	1	3	0	10	0	0	0	45	1
Aberdeen	1977–78	Scottish Premier Division	34	0	6	0	6	0	2	0	48	0
Aberdeen	1978–79	Scottish Premier Division	32	0	5	0	8	3	3	0	48	3
Aberdeen	1979–80	Scottish Premier Division	35	1	5	0	11	0	2	0	53	1
Aberdeen	1980–81	Scottish Premier Division	31	0	1	0	6	1	3	0	41	1
Aberdeen	1981–82	Scottish Premier Division	34	1	5	0	9	1	6	0	54	2
Aberdeen	1982–83	Scottish Premier Division	25	0	4	0	5	0	10	1	44	1
Aberdeen	Total		223	3	29	0	55	5	26	1	333	9
Career total			330	4	29+	0+	55+	5+	26	1	480	12

=== International ===
Appearances and goals by national team and year
National team	Year	Apps	Goals
Scotland	1978	7	0
Scotland	1979	—	
Scotland	1980	—	
Scotland	1981	1	0
Total		8	0
