= Andy Dornan =

Scottish footballer (born 1961)

Personal information
- Full name: Andrew Dornan
- Date of birth: 19 August 1961 (age 65)
- Place of birth: Aberdeen, Scotland
- Height: 5 ft 9 1/2 in (1.77 m)
- Position: Defender

Senior career*
Years	Team	Apps	(Gls)
1980–1981	Aberdeen	2	(0)
1982–1986	Motherwell	92	(4)
1986–1990	Walsall	118	(1)
Total		212	(5)

Managerial career
- 1995: Montrose
- * Club domestic league appearances and goals

Andrew Dornan (born 19 August 1961) is a Scottish former football player.

== Playing career ==
Dornan was born in Aberdeen in 1961. In the 1970s he played for junior club King Street, also appearing in 1977 for Scotland Schoolboys against England at Wembley in front of a crowd of 72,000.

He began his senior career with home town club Aberdeen in 1980. He was there for one season, during which he played two league games. He was then sold with Andy Harrow to Motherwell in 1982 by manager Alex Ferguson, who had concerns about the consistency of his ability. In 1986, he was signed by English club Walsall. He scored his only goal for Walsall on 11 May 1990, the equaliser in a 1–1 draw against Rotherham United, which was also Walsall's final goal at their Fellows Park stadium.

== Management career ==
Dornan was appointed manager of Montrose in 1995.

In 2007 he became head of the Edinburgh Centre of the AFC's youth programme. In 2014 AFC closed its Edinburgh and Glasgow youth programme centres, following a change to an Academy system.

In 2010, he was appointed as assistant manager to former Aberdeen teammate Neale Cooper at Peterhead. He was suspended from this role following an incident on the team bus before an away match. He was later cleared of all misconduct following an investigation.

== Life After Football ==
Since September 2020, Dornan has held the position of Business Development Manager at AJT Engineering in Aberdeen

From February 2013 through September 2020 Dornan held the position of Sales Manager at Kincardine Manufacturing Services Ltd (KMS) in Stonehaven, Aberdeenshire. KMS sponsored the AFC Community Trust mascot Donny The Sheep from its debut on 7 February 2015 until the end of the 2015/2016 season.

== Honours ==
Walsall

- Football League Third Division play-offs: 1988
