= 1979–80 Scottish Cup =

Tournament details
- Country: Scotland

Final positions
- Champions: Celtic
- Runners-up: Rangers

The 1979–80 Scottish Cup was the 95th staging of Scotland's most prestigious football knockout competition. The Cup was won by Celtic who defeated Rangers in the final. The match was marred by crowd trouble which resulted in violent clashes between rival fans and led to the current ban on alcohol at Scottish grounds.

== First round ==
Home team	Score	Away team
Annan Athletic	1 – 3	Stranraer
Cowdenbeath	3 – 0	Albion Rovers
East Stirlingshire	1 – 1	Brechin City
Queen of the South	1 – 1	Falkirk
Spartans	1 – 2	Forfar Athletic
Stenhousemuir	4 – 2	Queen's Park

=== Replays ===
Home team	Score	Away team
Falkirk	0 – 4	Queen of the South
Brechin City	1 – 1	East Stirlingshire

==== Second Replays ====
Home team	Score	Away team
Brechin City	1 – 0	East Stirlingshire

== Second round ==
Home team	Score	Away team
Alloa Athletic	1 – 0	East Fife
Brechin City	1 – 1	Montrose
Buckie Thistle	0 – 0	Brora Rangers
Coldstream	1 – 1	Queen of the South
Cowdenbeath	3 – 2	Forfar Athletic
Stenhousemuir	0 – 0	Peterhead
Stranraer	1 – 1	Meadowbank Thistle
Threave Rovers	2 – 3	Keith

=== Replays ===
Home team	Score	Away team
Brora Rangers	1 – 2	Buckie Thistle
Meadowbank Thistle	2 – 1	Stranraer
Montrose	3 – 4	Brechin City
Peterhead	2 – 0	Stenhousemuir
Queen of the South	4 – 0	Coldstream

== Third round ==
Home team	Score	Away team
Airdrieonians	3 – 1	St Johnstone
Alloa Athletic	0 – 1	Hearts
Dundee United	5 – 1	Dundee
Dunfermline Athletic	2 – 0	Buckie Thistle
Kilmarnock	0 – 1	Partick Thistle
Arbroath	1 – 1	Aberdeen
Berwick Rangers	3 – 1	Peterhead
Celtic	2 – 1	Raith Rovers
Clyde	2 – 2	Rangers
Clydebank	1 – 1	Stirling Albion
Dumbarton	1 – 2	Ayr United
Hamilton Academical	2 – 3	Keith
Meadowbank Thistle	0 – 1	Hibernian
Greenock Morton	1 – 0	Cowdenbeath
Queen of the South	2 – 0	Motherwell
St Mirren	3 – 1	Brechin City

=== Replays ===
Home team	Score	Away team
Aberdeen	5 – 0	Arbroath
Rangers	2 – 0	Clyde
Stirling Albion	1 – 1	Clydebank

==== Second Replays ====
Home team	Score	Away team
Clydebank	0 – 1	Stirling Albion

== Fourth round ==
Home team	Score	Away team
Hibernian	2 – 0	Ayr United
Aberdeen	8 – 0	Airdrieonians
Celtic	1 – 1	St Mirren
Hearts	2 – 0	Stirling Albion
Keith	1 – 2	Berwick Rangers
Greenock Morton	5 – 0	Dunfermline Athletic
Queen of the South	1 – 3	Partick Thistle
Rangers	1 – 0	Dundee United

=== Replays ===
Home team	Score	Away team
St Mirren	2 – 3	Celtic

== Quarter-finals ==
Home team	Score	Away team
Berwick Rangers	0 – 0	Hibernian
Celtic	2 – 0	Greenock Morton
Partick Thistle	1 – 2	Aberdeen
Rangers	6 – 1	Hearts

=== Replays ===
Home team	Score	Away team
Hibernian	1 – 0	Berwick Rangers

== Semi-finals ==
12 April 1980

Rangers	1–0	Aberdeen
Derek Johnstone 75'

Celtic Park, Glasgow
Attendance: 44,000
Referee: Douglas Downie

12 April 1980

Celtic	5–0	Hibernian
Bobby Lennox 9'; David Provan 48'; Johnny Doyle 54'; Murdo MacLeod 79'; Tom McAdam 86'

Hampden Park, Glasgow
Attendance: 32,925

== Final ==
10 May 1980

Celtic	1–0 (a.e.t.)	Rangers
McCluskey 107'

Hampden Park, Glasgow
Attendance: 70,303
Referee: George Smith

== See also ==
- 1979–80 in Scottish football
- 1979–80 Scottish League Cup
