= Doug Rougvie =

Scottish footballer and manager

Personal information
- Full name: Douglas Rougvie
- Date of birth: 24 May 1956 (age 70)
- Place of birth: Ballingry, Fife, Scotland
- Height: 6 ft 2 in (1.88 m)
- Position: Defender

Senior career*
| Years | Team | Apps | (Gls) |
| 1975–1984 | Aberdeen | 180 | (19) |
| 1984–1987 | Chelsea | 74 | (3) |
| 1987–1988 | Brighton & Hove Albion | 35 | (2) |
| 1988–1989 | Shrewsbury Town | 21 | (3) |
| 1989 | Fulham | 20 | (1) |
| 1989–1990 | Dunfermline Athletic | 28 | (0) |
| 1990–1992 | Montrose | 46 | (2) |
| Total | | 404 | (30) |

International career
| 1983 | Scotland | 1 | (0) |

Managerial career
- 1990–1992: Montrose (player-manager)
- Huntly
- 1997–1998: Cove Rangers
- * Club domestic league appearances and goals

Douglas Rougvie (born 24 May 1956) is a Scottish former footballer, who played mainly for Aberdeen and Chelsea. Rougvie played in one international match for Scotland, in 1983.

== Playing career ==
=== Aberdeen ===
A hard-tackling and committed defender, Rougvie played for Aberdeen between 1975 and 1984, one of the most successful periods in their history. After debuting for Aberdeen in an away friendly against Persepolis of Iran in summer '74, he made 279 appearances (28 as substitute) and scored 21 goals, winning the Scottish league championship in 1979–80 and 1983–84, the Scottish Cup in 1982, 1983 and 1984, the UEFA Cup Winners' Cup in 1983 and the European Super Cup in 1983.

Rougvie previously won the Scottish 2nd XI Cup with the reserves in 1976 and 1978.

Rougvie was the first player to be sent off in a Scottish League Cup final in 1979.

While an Aberdeen player, Rougvie played one game for Scotland in 1983.

=== Chelsea ===
Rougvie signed for newly promoted English side Chelsea in 1984 for £150,000, a team which included the likes of Kerry Dixon, Pat Nevin and David Speedie. He made his debut for the club in the opening game of the new season against Arsenal at Highbury, at one point managing to floor Arsenal's Viv Anderson with a crunching challenge. Though initially a regular in the side, Rougvie's lack of pace and often reckless tackling were to hamper his progress with the club.

During a League Cup quarter-final match with Sheffield Wednesday at Hillsborough, Chelsea came from 0–3 down to lead 4–3, only for Rougvie to concede a last minute penalty with a careless challenge and cost the team victory. He lost his place in the side towards the end of the 1984–85 season and thereafter only featured sporadically, though he did play in Chelsea's Full Members Cup win over Manchester City at Wembley; despite scoring an own goal, his team won 5–4. He was later sent off within ten minutes of the kick-off in a match against Wimbledon for punching Dave Beasant and headbutting Carlton Fairweather.

=== Brighton and Hove Albion ===
He was sold to Brighton and Hove Albion in the summer of 1987 for £73,000 having made 100 appearances for Chelsea and scored three goals.

=== Later career ===
He later had brief spells with Fulham, Shrewsbury Town and Dunfermline, as well as a stint managing Scottish Part Time professional side, Montrose before playing for, and subsequently managing Huntly in the Scottish Highland Football League.

Rougvie quit playing in 1996 to solely focus on being Huntly manager. After his departure in October 1997, he made an swift return with Cove Rangers. His tenure last just over year.

Rougvie made a brief comeback to play for Buckie Thistle and Kincorth Amateurs. He fully retired at 45 years old.

== Career statistics ==
=== Club ===
Appearances and goals by club, season and competition
| Club | Seasons | League | | | National Cup | | League Cup | | Europe | | Other | | Total | |
| Club | Seasons | Division | Apps | Goals | Apps | Goals | Apps | Goals | Apps | Goals | Apps | Goals | Apps | Goals |
|---|---|---|---|---|---|---|---|---|---|---|---|---|---|---|
| Aberdeen | 1974–75 | Scottish Division One | 0 | 0 | 0 | 0 | 0 | 0 | 0 | 0 | - | - | 0 | 0 |
| Aberdeen | 1975–76 | Scottish Premier Division | 2 | 0 | 0 | 0 | 5 | 0 | 0 | 0 | - | - | 7 | 0 |
| Aberdeen | 1976–77 | Scottish Premier Division | 6 | 1 | 0 | 0 | 0 | 0 | 0 | 0 | - | - | 6 | 1 |
| Aberdeen | 1977–78 | Scottish Premier Division | 1 | 0 | 0 | 0 | 0 | 0 | 0 | 0 | - | - | 1 | 0 |
| Aberdeen | 1978–79 | Scottish Premier Division | 21 | 0 | 4 | 0 | 6 | 1 | 3 | 0 | - | - | 34 | 1 |
| Aberdeen | 1979–80 | Scottish Premier Division | 25 | 2 | 4 | 0 | 8 | 0 | 0 | 0 | - | - | 37 | 2 |
| Aberdeen | 1980–81 | Scottish Premier Division | 28 | 3 | 1 | 0 | 6 | 0 | 4 | 0 | - | - | 39 | 3 |
| Aberdeen | 1981–82 | Scottish Premier Division | 28 | 6 | 5 | 0 | 5 | 0 | 5 | 0 | - | - | 43 | 6 |
| Aberdeen | 1982–83 | Scottish Premier Division | 35 | 3 | 5 | 0 | 7 | 1 | 9 | 0 | - | - | 56 | 4 |
| Aberdeen | 1983–84 | Scottish Premier Division | 35 | 4 | 7 | 0 | 8 | 0 | 7 | 0 | - | - | 57 | 4 |
| Aberdeen | Total | | 181 | 19 | 26 | 0 | 45 | 2 | 28 | 0 | - | - | 280 | 21 |
| Chelsea | 1984–85 | First Division | 27 | 1 | 2 | 0 | 8 | 0 | - | - | 0 | 0 | 37 | 1 |
| Chelsea | 1985–86 | First Division | 34 | 2 | 2 | 0 | 5 | 0 | - | - | 4 | 0 | 45 | 2 |
| Chelsea | 1986–87 | First Division | 13 | 0 | 0 | 0 | 3 | 0 | - | - | 2 | 0 | 18 | 0 |
| Chelsea | Total | | 74 | 3 | 4 | 0 | 16 | 0 | - | - | 6 | 0 | 100 | 3 |
| Brighton & Hove Albion | 1987–88 | Third Division | 35 | 2 | - | - | - | - | -- | - | - | - | 43 | 2 |
| Shrewsbury Town | 1988–89 | Second Division | 21 | 3 | - | - | - | - | - | - | - | - | 21+ | 3+ |
| Fulham | 1988–89 | Third Division | 20 | 1 | 0 | 0 | 0 | 0 | - | - | - | - | 20 | 1 |
| Dunfermline Athletic | 1989–90 | Scottish Premier Division | 28 | 0 | 4 | 0 | 4 | 2 | - | - | - | - | 36 | 2 |
| Montrose | 1990–91 | Scottish Second Division | 29 | 2 | - | - | - | - | - | - | - | - | 29+ | 2+ |
| Montrose | 1991–92 | Scottish First Division | 16 | 0 | - | - | - | - | - | - | - | - | 16+ | 0+ |
| Montrose | Total | | 45 | 2 | - | - | - | - | - | - | - | - | 45+ | 2+ |
| Career total | | | 404+ | 30+ | 34+ | 0+ | 65+ | 4+ | 28 | 0 | 6 | 0 | 545+ | 34+ |

=== International ===
Appearances and goals by national team and year
| National team | Year | Apps | Goals |
|---|---|---|---|
| Scotland | 1983 | 1 | 0 |
| Total | | 1 | 0 |

== Honours ==
=== Player ===
Aberdeen

- Scottish Premier Division: 1979–80, 1983–84
- Scottish Cup: 1981–82, 1982–83, 1983–84
- Aberdeenshire Cup: 1980–81
- UEFA Cup Winners' Cup: 1982–83
- UEFA Super Cup: 1983

Chelsea

- Full Members' Cup: 1985–86

Brighton

- Football League Third Division promotion: 1987–88

Montrose

- Scottish Second Division promotion: 1990–91

Huntly

- Highland League: 1995–96
- Highland League Cup: 1995–96
- Aberdeenshire Cup: 1995–96

=== Manager ===
Montrose

- Scottish Second Division promotion: 1990–91

Huntly

- Highland League: 1995–96, 1996–97
- Highland League Cup: 1995–96
- Aberdeenshire Cup: 1995–96
- Qualifying Cup North: 1996–97

=== Individual ===
- Aberdeen FC Hall of Fame: Inducted, 2019
