= Neil Cooper (footballer) =

Scottish footballer and manager

Personal information
- Date of birth: 12 August 1958 (age 68)
- Place of birth: Aberdeen, Scotland
- Position: Defender

Senior career*
| Years | Team | Apps | (Gls) |
| 1974–1979 | Aberdeen | 12 | (1) |
| 1979–1981 | Barnsley | 60 | (6) |
| 1981–1983 | Grimsby Town | 47 | (2) |
| 1983–1989 | St Mirren | 160 | (2) |
| 1989–1991 | Hibernian | 38 | (0) |
| Total | | 325 | (11) |

Managerial career
- 2000–2003: Forfar Athletic
- 2017–2019: Inverurie Loco Works
- * Club domestic league appearances and goals

Neil Cooper (born 12 August 1958) is a Scottish football manager and former professional footballer who, most recently, was manager of Inverurie Loco Works of the Highland League. He played for Aberdeen, Barnsley, Grimsby Town, St Mirren and Hibernian, and previously managed Forfar Athletic.

== Playing career ==
Cooper began his professional career with Aberdeen and made 12 appearances for the Dons. He moved to Barnsley in 1979, then played for Grimsby Town. He returned to Scotland in 1983 to play for St Mirren, where he was part of the team which won the Scottish Cup in 1987. He was voted man of the match during the 1987 Scottish Cup Final. He left St Mirren in 1989 to play for Hibernian for two years, before retiring in 1991.

== Later career ==
After retiring from football, Neil Cooper returned to Aberdeen as part of the coaching staff, then became Assistant Manager to Paul Hegarty during his short spell as manager in 1999. He left Aberdeen to manage Forfar Athletic from 2000 to 2003, before returning to Aberdeen in 2003 to become youth coach.

In December 2010, Cooper was placed in temporary charge of Aberdeen following the departure of Mark McGhee. Cooper then returned to a youth coaching role at Aberdeen. He left the club at the end of the 2013–14 season.

On 3 January 2017, Cooper become the manager at Inverurie Loco Works

== Honours ==
- Scottish Cup: 1987
