= Andy Harrow =

Scottish footballer

Personal information
- Full name: Andrew Harrow
- Date of birth: 6 November 1956 (age 69)
- Place of birth: Kirkcaldy, Scotland
- Position: Forward

Youth career
- ?–1973: Greig Park Rangers

Senior career*
Years	Team	Apps	(Gls)
1973–1977	Cowdenbeath	95	(18)
1976–1981	Raith Rovers	149	(42)
1980–1981	Luton Town	4	(0)
1981–1982	Aberdeen	18	(3)
1982–1986	Motherwell	103	(19)
1986–1988	Raith Rovers	64	(10)
1988–1990	East Fife	40	(2)
Total		473	(94)

Managerial career
- 1992–1993: Cowdenbeath
- * Club domestic league appearances and goals

Andy Harrow (born 6 November 1956) is a Scottish former football player.

== Playing career ==
Andy Harrow was born in Kirkcaldy in 1956. He began his career with Cowdenbeath, signing from Junior club Greig Park Rangers in 1973. After four seasons at Cowdenbeath, he joined home town club Raith Rovers. After leaving Raith, he had a short spell with English club Luton Town, before Alex Ferguson signed him for Aberdeen in 1980. First team opportunities were limited for Harrow at Aberdeen, so he left Pittodrie to join Motherwell in 1982. After four years at Fir Park, he returned to Raith Rovers for two years, and ended his career in 1990 at East Fife.

== Personal life ==
After retiring from playing, he became reserve team coach at Raith Rovers. He also served as manager of Cowdenbeath from 1992 to 1993.
