= Doug Considine =

Scottish footballer (born 1957)

Personal information
- Date of birth: 15 May 1957 (age 69)
- Place of birth: Edinburgh, Scotland
- Position: Defender

Senior career*
Years	Team	Apps	(Gls)
1978–1981	Aberdeen	32	(0)
1981–1983	Dunfermline Athletic	52	(5)
Total		84	(5)
- * Club domestic league appearances and goals

Doug Considine (born 15 May 1957) is a Scottish former footballer. As a squad player he was a Scottish League winner at Aberdeen in 1980. A year later in 1981, he moved to Dunfermline Athletic in pursuit of first team football. Two seasons later, he retired as a footballer aged 26.

== Playing career ==
Doug Considine was born in Edinburgh in 1957. He joined Aberdeen from Highland League club Huntly in 1978 and spent three seasons at Pittodrie, where he was part of the team which won the Scottish Premier Division in 1980, playing fifteen times in the league that season.

He left Aberdeen in 1981 to join Dunfermline, where he remained until 1983, when he retired aged 26.

== Honours ==
Aberdeen A

- Scottish 2nd XI Cup: 1977–78
- SFL Reserve Cup: 1978–79

Aberdeen

- Scottish Premier Division 1979–80
- Drybrough Cup: 1980

== Personal life ==
Considine's son Andrew Considine is also a former professional footballer. His brother Iain Considine is a cofounder of the law firm Aberdein Considine.

Considine ran a dry cleaning business in Banchory following his retirement from football.
