= Derek Hamilton =

Scottish footballer (born 1958)

Personal information
- Full name: Derek Hamilton
- Date of birth: 26 August 1958 (age 68)
- Place of birth: Kilwinning, Scotland
- Position: Defender

Youth career
- 15 April 1978: Beith Juniors

Senior career*
Years	Team	Apps	(Gls)
1978–1983	Aberdeen	34	(3)
1983–1989	St Mirren	116	(0)
1989–1990	Stranraer	1	(0)
1990–1991	Morton	4	(0)
Total		155	(3)
- * Club domestic league appearances and goals

Derek Martin Hamilton (born 26 August 1958) is a Scottish former football player, known for playing for St Mirren F.C.

== Playing career ==
Derek Hamilton was born in Kilwinning in 1958. He joined Aberdeen from junior club Beith Juniors in 1978 and spent five years at Aberdeen. He joined St Mirren F.C. in 1983, where he spent six years and was part of the team which won the 1987 Scottish Cup Final. On leaving St Mirren in 1989, he had spells at Stranraer and Morton. He returned to Junior football with Irvine Meadow, and retired in 1991.

== Honours ==
- Scottish Cup Winner: 1

1986–87

== Personal life ==
Hamilton has been living in Stewarton, Ayrshire since 2012.
