= 1979–80 Scottish Premier Division =

74th season of top-tier football league in Scotland

Scottish Premier Division
- Season: 1979–80
- Champions: Aberdeen; 1st Premier Division title 2nd Scottish title
- Relegated: Dundee; Hibernian
- European Cup: Aberdeen
- UEFA Cup: St Mirren; Dundee United
- Cup Winners' Cup: Celtic
- Matches: 180
- Goals: 484 (2.69 per match)
- Top goalscorer: Doug Somner (25)
- Biggest home win: Celtic 5–0 Kilmarnock
- Biggest away win: Hibernian 0–5 Aberdeen

The 1979–80 Scottish Premier Division season was won by Aberdeen, one point ahead of Celtic. Dundee and Hibernian were relegated. St Mirren's 3rd place was their highest finishing position in the league since the 1892-93 season.

== Table ==
| Pos | Team | Pld | W | D | L | GF | GA | GD | Pts | Qualification or relegation |
|---|---|---|---|---|---|---|---|---|---|---|
| 1 | Aberdeen (C) | 36 | 19 | 10 | 7 | 68 | 36 | +32 | 48 | Qualification for the European Cup first round |
| 2 | Celtic | 36 | 18 | 11 | 7 | 61 | 38 | +23 | 47 | Qualification for the Cup Winners' Cup first round |
| 3 | St Mirren | 36 | 15 | 12 | 9 | 56 | 49 | +7 | 42 | Qualification for the UEFA Cup first round |
| 4 | Dundee United | 36 | 12 | 13 | 11 | 43 | 30 | +13 | 37 | Qualification for the UEFA Cup first round |
| 5 | Rangers | 36 | 15 | 7 | 14 | 50 | 46 | +4 | 37 | |
| 6 | Morton | 36 | 14 | 8 | 14 | 51 | 46 | +5 | 36 | |
| 7 | Partick Thistle | 36 | 11 | 14 | 11 | 43 | 47 | −4 | 36 | |
| 8 | Kilmarnock | 36 | 11 | 11 | 14 | 36 | 52 | −16 | 33 | |
| 9 | Dundee (R) | 36 | 10 | 6 | 20 | 47 | 73 | −26 | 26 | Relegation to the 1980–81 Scottish First Division |
| 10 | Hibernian (R) | 36 | 6 | 6 | 24 | 29 | 67 | −38 | 18 | Relegation to the 1980–81 Scottish First Division |

Source: Statto and RSSSF
Rules for classification: 1) points; 2) goal difference; 3) number of goals scored.
(C) Champions; (R) Relegated

== Results ==
=== Matches 1–18 ===
During matches 1–18 each team plays every other team twice (home and away).

| Home \ Away | ABE | CEL | DND | DNU | HIB | KIL | MOR | PAR | RAN | STM |
|---|---|---|---|---|---|---|---|---|---|---|
| Aberdeen | | 0–0 | 2–1 | 2–1 | 1–1 | 1–2 | 1–0 | 1–1 | 3–2 | 2–0 |
| Celtic | 1–3 | | 2–2 | 1–0 | 4–0 | 2–0 | 3–1 | 2–1 | 1–0 | 2–2 |
| Dundee | 1–3 | 0–2 | | 1–1 | 3–0 | 0–2 | 1–0 | 1–1 | 1–4 | 1–3 |
| Dundee United | 1–1 | 3–0 | 2–0 | | 1–0 | 0–0 | 2–0 | 0–0 | 0–0 | 0–0 |
| Hibernian | 0–5 | 1–1 | 2–0 | 0–2 | | 1–2 | 3–2 | 0–1 | 2–1 | 2–1 |
| Kilmarnock | 1–3 | 1–1 | 1–1 | 0–0 | 3–1 | | 0–2 | 0–1 | 1–0 | 1–1 |
| Morton | 3–2 | 1–0 | 2–0 | 4–1 | 2–0 | 3–1 | | 2–1 | 0–1 | 0–0 |
| Partick Thistle | 1–1 | 1–1 | 3–0 | 2–2 | 1–0 | 1–1 | 0–1 | | 4–3 | 1–2 |
| Rangers | 2–2 | 1–1 | 1–0 | 2–1 | 1–0 | 1–0 | 3–1 | 0–0 | | 1–2 |
| St Mirren | 1–1 | 0–0 | 2–1 | 2–1 | 2–0 | 3–1 | 2–2 | 3–0 | 4–1 | |

Legend: Blue = home team win; Yellow = draw; Red = away team win.

==== Matches 19–36 ====
| Home \ Away | ABE | CEL | DND | DNU | HIB | KIL | MOR | PAR | RAN | STM |
|---|---|---|---|---|---|---|---|---|---|---|
| Aberdeen | | 1–2 | 3–0 | 0–3 | 3–0 | 3–1 | 1–2 | 1–1 | 3–1 | 2–0 |
| Celtic | 1–2 | | 3–0 | 2–2 | 3–0 | 5–0 | 3–2 | 5–1 | 1–0 | 3–1 |
| Dundee | 0–4 | 5–1 | | 1–0 | 2–1 | 3–1 | 4–3 | 2–2 | 3–1 | 4–1 |
| Dundee United | 1–3 | 0–1 | 3–0 | | 2–0 | 4–0 | 2–0 | 2–1 | 0–0 | 0–0 |
| Hibernian | 1–1 | 1–3 | 5–2 | 0–2 | | 1–1 | 1–1 | 2–1 | 1–3 | 0–2 |
| Kilmarnock | 0–4 | 2–0 | 3–1 | 1–0 | 1–0 | | 1–1 | 0–1 | 2–1 | 1–1 |
| Morton | 1–0 | 0–1 | 1–1 | 0–0 | 1–1 | 1–2 | | 1–3 | 0–1 | 2–1 |
| Partick Thistle | 1–0 | 0–0 | 2–3 | 1–1 | 2–1 | 0–0 | 1–4 | | 2–1 | 1–1 |
| Rangers | 0–1 | 2–2 | 2–0 | 2–1 | 2–0 | 2–1 | 2–2 | 2–1 | | 3–1 |
| St Mirren | 2–2 | 2–1 | 4–2 | 3–2 | 2–1 | 2–2 | 0–3 | 1–2 | 2–1 | |

Legend: Blue = home team win; Yellow = draw; Red = away team win.

== Awards ==
| Award | Winner | Club |
|---|---|---|
| PFA Players' Player of the Year | (Scotland) Davie Provan | Celtic |
| PFA Young Player of the Year | (Scotland) John MacDonald | Rangers |
| SFWA Footballer of the Year | (Scotland) Gordon Strachan | Aberdeen |
