= 1973–74 Aberdeen F.C. season =

Aberdeen F.C.
1973–74 season
- Chairman: Dick Donald
- Manager: Jimmy Bonthrone
- Scottish First Division: 4th
- Scottish Cup: Third Round
- Scottish League Cup: Quarter-finalists
- UEFA Cup: Second Round
- Top goalscorer: League: Drew Jarvie (13); All: Drew Jarvie (24)
- Highest home attendance: 23,574 vs. Dundee, 27 January 1974
- Lowest home attendance: 3,945 vs. Ayr United, 27 April 1974
- Average home league attendance: 7.692
Home colours

During the 1973–74 season, Aberdeen F.C. competed in the Scottish First Division under manager Jimmy Bonthrone. The club finished fourth in the league, reached the quarter-finals of the Scottish League Cup, was eliminated in the third round of the Scottish Cup, and reached the second round of the UEFA Cup. Drew Jarvie was Aberdeen's leading scorer, with 24 goals in all competitions, including 13 in the league.

== Results ==
=== Scottish First Division ===
Match Day	Date	Opponent	H/A	Score	Aberdeen Scorer(s)	Attendance
1.	1 September	Motherwell	A	0–0		6,083
2.	8 September	Dundee	H	0–0		9,517
3.	15 September	St Johnstone	A	2–1	B. Miller, Hair	4,000
4.	29 September	Clyde	A	3–1	Robb (2), Jarvie	2,375
5.	6 October	Hibernian	H	1–1	Jarvie	13,954
6.	13 October	Dumbarton	A	1–0	Jarvie	3,000
7.	20 October	Dunfermline Athletic	H	0–0		7,351
8.	27 October	Dundee United	H	3–1	Graham, Robb, Jarvie	7,081
9.	3 November	Morton	A	0–2		4,000
10.	10 November	Falkirk	A	3–1	Robb (2), Jarvie	3,500
11.	17 November	Hearts	H	3–1	Anderson (Own goal), W. Miller, Jarvie	11,000
12.	24 November	East Fife	A	2–2	Hermiston, Robb	2,597
13.	22 December	Arbroath	A	3–1	Taylor (3)	2,711
14.	29 December	Motherwell	H	0–0		8,000
15.	1 January	Dundee	A	1–1	Graham	9,451
16.	5 January	St Johnstone	H	0–1		6,000
17.	12 January	Rangers	A	1–1	Purdie	16,000
18.	19 January	Clyde	H	1–1	Jarvie	7,000
19.	2 February	Hibernian	A	1–3	Robb	15,700
20.	9 February	Dumbarton	H	3–0	Young, Robb, Jarvie	4,000
21.	24 February	Dunfermline Athletic	A	0–0		6,959
22.	3 March	Dundee United	A	3–0	Robb, Addison (Own goal), Narey (Own goal)	6,500
23.	9 March	Morton	H	0–0		5,000
24.	16 March	Falkirk	H	6–0	Jarvie (4), Young, Robb	5,500
25.	23 March	Hearts	A	0–0		13,500
26.	30 March	East Fife	H	2–0	Graham, Jarvie	5,000
27.	6 April	Ayr United	A	0–0		5,000
28.	8 April	Partick Thistle	A	0–2		3,500
29.	13 April	Partick Thistle	H	2–0	Robb, Smith	6,000
30.	17 April	Rangers	H	1–1	MacDougall (Own goal)	18,000
31.	20 April	Celtic	A	0–2		31,000
32.	24 April	Ayr United	H	2–1	Thomson, McCall	3,945
33.	27 April	Arbroath	H	2–2	McLelland, McCall	4,000
34.	29 April	Celtic	H	0–0		14,000

==== Final standings ====
Scottish Division One
- Season: 1973–74
- Champions: Celtic; 29th title
- Relegated: East Fife; Falkirk

The 1973–74 Scottish Division One was won by Celtic by four points over nearest rival Hibernian. East Fife and Falkirk finished 17th and 18th respectively and were relegated to the 1974–75 Second Division.

This was Celtic's ninth title in a row, a record that would be equalled by Rangers in the 1996–97 season and again by Celtic themselves in 2019–20.

== Table ==
Pos	Team	Pld	W	D	L	GF	GA	GD	Pts	Qualification or relegation
1	Celtic	34	23	7	4	82	27	+55	53	Champion
2	Hibernian	34	20	9	5	75	42	+33	49	
3	Rangers	34	21	6	7	67	34	+33	48	
4	Aberdeen	34	13	16	5	46	26	+20	42	
5	Dundee	34	16	7	11	67	48	+19	39	
6	Heart of Midlothian	34	14	10	10	54	43	+11	38	
7	Ayr United	34	15	8	11	44	40	+4	38	
8	Dundee United	34	15	7	12	55	51	+4	37	1974–75 European Cup Winners' Cup First round
9	Motherwell	34	14	7	13	45	40	+5	35	
10	Dumbarton	34	11	7	16	43	58	−15	29	
11	Partick Thistle	34	9	10	15	33	46	−13	28	
12	St Johnstone	34	9	10	15	41	60	−19	28	
13	Arbroath	34	10	7	17	52	69	−17	27	
14	Morton	34	8	10	16	37	49	−12	26	
15	Clyde	34	8	9	17	29	65	−36	25	
16	Dunfermline Athletic	34	8	8	18	43	65	−22	24	
17	East Fife	34	9	6	19	26	51	−25	24	Relegated to 1974–75 Second Division
18	Falkirk	34	4	14	16	33	58	−25	22	Relegated to 1974–75 Second Division

Source: Soccerbase and League Tables

== Results ==
Home \ Away	ABE	ARB	AYR	CEL	CLY	DUM	DND	DNU	DNF	EFI	FAL	HOM	HIB	MOR	MOT	PAR	RAN	STJ
Aberdeen		2–2	2–1	0–0	1–1	3–0	0–0	3–1	0–0	2–0	6–0	3–1	1–1	0–0	0–0	2–0	1–1	0–1
Arbroath	1–3		1–1	1–2	1–2	2–1	2–4	1–2	3–1	1–2	0–0	2–3	3–2	2–1	0–2	0–3	1–2	3–1
Ayr United	0–0	1–2		0–1	2–2	0–1	4–2	1–1	3–1	1–0	1–0	2–1	1–1	2–1	1–0	1–0	0–1	3–2
Celtic	2–0	1–0	4–0		5–0	3–3	1–2	3–3	6–0	4–2	6–0	1–0	1–1	1–1	2–0	7–0	1–0	3–0
Clyde	1–3	3–2	1–3	0–2		0–3	0–2	1–2	1–0	2–0	0–0	2–0	1–1	0–2	0–3	1–0	0–2	0–1
Dumbarton	0–1	5–2	0–2	0–2	1–1		2–0	1–2	1–0	1–1	1–5	0–1	3–3	1–0	3–0	2–0	0–2	2–1
Dundee	1–1	5–2	2–1	0–1	6–1	2–1		0–1	1–5	0–1	4–0	0–0	1–3	2–1	0–1	4–1	2–3	2–2
Dundee United	0–3	3–1	2–1	0–2	4–0	6–0	1–2		0–1	0–0	2–1	3–3	1–4	4–2	0–1	1–1	1–3	2–0
Dunfermline Athletic	0–0	1–1	0–4	2–3	2–3	3–2	1–5	2–3		0–1	4–0	2–3	2–3	1–1	2–4	1–1	2–2	3–1
East Fife	2–2	0–2	0–1	1–6	1–0	0–1	0–3	0–2	0–1		1–2	0–0	0–3	0–1	1–0	2–1	0–3	1–2
Falkirk	1–3	2–2	1–1	1–1	3–0	2–3	3–3	0–1	0–1	1–1		0–2	0–0	1–1	1–1	0–0	0–0	1–1
Heart of Midlothian	0–0	4–0	0–1	1–3	0–0	0–0	2–2	1–1	3–0	2–2	2–1		4–1	0–2	2–0	3–1	2–4	0–2
Hibernian	3–1	2–1	4–2	2–4	5–0	3–0	2–1	3–1	1–1	2–1	2–0	3–1		5–0	1–0	2–1	3–1	3–3
Morton	2–0	1–1	1–2	0–0	2–2	3–1	0–1	0–2	1–2	1–0	0–3	2–3	0–3		4–3	0–0	2–3	1–1
Motherwell	0–0	3–4	2–0	3–2	0–0	2–0	2–2	4–0	1–0	3–1	2–1	2–2	1–1	1–0		1–2	1–4	0–1
Partick Thistle	2–0	2–3	3–0	2–0	1–3	0–0	1–0	2–1	1–1	0–1	2–2	1–3	1–0	0–0	1–0		0–1	0–1
Rangers	1–1	2–3	0–0	0–1	4–0	3–1	1–2	3–1	3–0	0–1	2–1	0–3	4–0	1–0	2–1	1–1		5–1
St Johnstone	1–2	0–0	1–1	2–1	1–1	3–3	1–4	1–1	3–1	1–3	2–0	0–2	0–2	1–4	0–1	2–2	1–3	

Legend: Blue = home team win; Yellow = draw; Red = away team win.

=== Scottish League Cup ===
==== Group stage ====
Round	Date	Opponent	H/A	Score	Aberdeen Scorer(s)	Attendance
G4	11 August	Motherwell	H	3–1	Hermiston, Smith, Graham	10,722
G4	15 August	Dundee United	A	0–0		6,000
G4	18 August	East Fife	H	1–1	Williamson	8,188
G4	22 August	Dundee United	H	0–2		8,912
G4	25 August	East Fife	A	3–0	B. Miller, Graham	4,153
G4	28 August	Motherwell	A	0–0		9,808

==== Group 4 final table ====
Team	Pld	W	D	L	GF	GA	GD	Pts
Motherwell	6	3	1	2	13	6	+7	7
Aberdeen	6	2	3	1	6	4	+2	7
Dundee United	6	3	1	2	9	10	−1	7
East Fife	6	1	1	4	7	15	−8	3

==== Knockout stage ====
Round	Date	Opponent	H/A	Score	Aberdeen Scorer(s)	Attendance
R2 L1	12 September	Stirling Albion	H	3–0	Jarvie (2), Graham	7,500
R2 L2	10 October	Stirling Albion	A	3–0	Jarvie (3)	3,000
QF L1	31 October	Celtic	A	2–3	Jarvie (2)	26,000
QF L2	21 November	Celtic	H	0–0		15,500

=== Scottish Cup ===
Round	Date	Opponent	H/A	Score	Aberdeen Scorer(s)	Attendance
R3	27 January	Dundee	H	0–2		23,574

=== UEFA Cup ===
Round	Date	Opponent	H/A	Score	Aberdeen Scorer(s)	Attendance
R1 L1	19 September	(Republic of Ireland) Finn Harps	H	4–1	Jarvie (2), B. Miller, Graham	10,700
R1 L2	3 October	(Republic of Ireland) Finn Harps	A	1–2	Robb, Jarvie, B. Miller	5,500
R2 L1	24 October	(England) Tottenham Hotspur	H	1–1	Hermiston	30,000
R2 L2	7 November	(England) Tottenham Hotspur	A	1–4	Jarvie	21,785

== Squad ==
=== Appearances & Goals ===
No.	Pos	Nat	Player	Total		Division One		Scottish Cup		League Cup		UEFA Cup	
No.	Pos	Nat	Player	Apps	Goals	Apps	Goals	Apps	Goals	Apps	Goals	Apps	Goals
	GK	(Scotland) SCO	Bobby Clark	49	0	34	0	1	0	10	0	4	0
	GK	(Scotland) SCO	Andy Geoghegan	0	0	0	0	0	0	0	0	0	0
	DF	(Scotland) SCO	Willie Young (c)	49	2	34	2	1	0	10	0	4	0
	DF	(Scotland) SCO	Jim Hermiston	48	3	33	1	1	0	10	1	4	1
	DF	(Scotland) SCO	Eddie Thomson	47	1	32	1	1	0	10	0	4	0
	DF	(Scotland) SCO	Willie Miller	45	1	31	1	1	0	9	0	4	0
	DF	(Scotland) SCO	Ian Hair	26	1	18	1	0	0	4	0	4	0
	DF	(Scotland) SCO	Chic McLelland	15	1	15	1	0	0	0	0	0	0
	DF	(Scotland) SCO	Billy Williamson	11	1	4	0	0	0	7	1	0	0
	DF	(Denmark) DEN	Henning Boel	9	0	7	0	1	0	1	0	0	0
	MF	(Scotland) SCO	Arthur Graham	46	7	32	3	1	0	9	3	4	1
	MF	(Scotland) SCO	Joe Smith	37	2	25	1	1	0	8	1	3	0
	MF	(Scotland) SCO	Ian Taylor	29	3	17	3	1	0	9	0	2	0
	MF	(Scotland) SCO	Bertie Miller	21	4	7	1	0	0	10	1	4	2
	MF	(Scotland) SCO	Alex Willoughby	19	0	11	0	0	0	5	0	3	0
	MF	(Scotland) SCO	Ian Purdie	13	1	8	1	1	0	3	0	1	0
	MF	(Scotland) SCO	Jim Henry	7	0	6	0	1	0	0	0	0	0
	MF	(Scotland) SCO	Jimmy Miller	6	0	5	0	0	0	1	0	0	0
	FW	(Scotland) SCO	Drew Jarvie	47	24	32	13	1	0	10	7	4	4
	FW	(Scotland) SCO	Dave Robb	28	12	21	11	1	0	3	0	3	1
	FW	(Scotland) SCO	John Craig	10	0	8	0	0	0	2	0	0	0
	FW	(Scotland) SCO	Billy Pirie	9	0	9	0	0	0	0	0	0	0
	FW	(Scotland) SCO	Walker McCall	7	2	7	2	0	0	0	0	0	0
	FW	(Scotland) SCO	Duncan Davidson	5	0	5	0	0	0	0	0	0	0
	FW	(Scotland) SCO	Barrie Mitchell	2	0	1	0	0	0	0	0	1	0
	FW	(Scotland) SCO	Bobby Street	2	0	2	0	0	0	0	0	0	0
