= 1976 Scottish League Cup final =

- Event: 1976–77 Scottish League Cup
Aberdeen	Celtic
2	1
- Date: 6 November 1976
- Venue: Hampden Park, Glasgow
- Referee: John Wright Paterson (Bothwell)
- Attendance: 69,707

The 1976 Scottish League Cup final was played on 6 November 1976 and was the final of the 31st Scottish League Cup competition. It was contested by Aberdeen and Celtic. Aberdeen won the match 2–1, thanks to goals by Drew Jarvie and Davie Robb.

== Match details ==
6 November 1976

Aberdeen	2–1 (a.e.t.)	Celtic
Jarvie; Robb		Dalglish

Hampden Park, Glasgow
Attendance: 69,707

ABERDEEN:
GK	1	Bobby Clark
DF	2	Stuart Kennedy
DF	3	Billy Williamson
MF	4	Joe Smith
DF	5	Willie Garner
DF	6	Willie Miller (c)
MF	7	Dom Sullivan
FW	8	Jocky Scott
FW	9	Joe Harper
FW	10	Drew Jarvie	Substituted off
MF	11	Arthur Graham
Substitutes:
MF	16	George Campbell
FW	12	Davie Robb	Substituted on
Manager:
Ally MacLeod

CELTIC:
GK	1	Peter Latchford
DF	2	Danny McGrain
DF	3	Andy Lynch
MF	4	Johannes Edvaldsson
DF	5	Roddie MacDonald
DF	6	Roy Aitken
MF	7	Johnny Doyle
MF	8	Ronnie Glavin
FW	9	Kenny Dalglish (c)
MF	10	Tommy Burns	Substituted off
MF	11	Paul Wilson
Substitutes:
MF	?	Bobby Lennox	Substituted on
Manager:
Jock Stein
