= 1976–77 Aberdeen F.C. season =

Aberdeen F.C.
1976–77 season
- Chairman: Dick Donald
- Manager: Ally MacLeod
- Scottish Premier Division: 3rd
- Scottish Cup: Fourth round
- Scottish League Cup: Winners
- Anglo-Scottish Cup: Quarter-finalist
- Top goalscorer: League: Joe Harper (18); All: Joe Harper (30)
- Highest home attendance: 21,656 vs. Celtic, 5 March 1977
- Lowest home attendance: 5,836 vs. Partick Thistle, 16 April 1977
- Average home league attendance: 12,469

== Results ==
=== Scottish Premier Division ===
Match Day	Date	Opponent	H/A	Score	Aberdeen Scorer(s)	Attendance
1.	4 September	Hearts	H	2–2	Fleming, Robb	11,727
2.	11 September	Ayr United	A	5–0	Sullivan (2), Harper (2), Fleming	4,800
3.	18 September	Kilmarnock	H	2–0	Jarvie (3), Gibson	8,712
4.	25 September	Hibernian	A	0–0		9,278
5.	2 October	Partick Thistle	A	2–2	Harper, Fleming	5,000
6.	16 October	Rangers	A	0–1		22,000
7.	23 October	Celtic	H	2–1	Harper (2)	19,379
8.	30 October	Dundee United	H	3–2	Jarvie, Harper, Williamson	18,577
9.	2 November	Motherwell	H	3–1	Jarvie, Sullivan, Harper	15,207
10.	10 November	Hearts	A	1–2	Harper	10,500
11.	20 November	Kilmarnock	A	2–1	Scott, Kennedy	5,000
12.	24 November	Ayr United	H	1–0	Harper	10,581
13.	27 November	Hibernian	H	1–0	Harper	14,788
14.	26 December	Celtic	A	2–2	Jarvie (2)	47,000
15.	3 January	Hearts	H	4–1	Harper (3), Jarvie	18,761
16.	8 January	Ayr United	A	0–0		5,600
17.	12 January	Partick Thistle	H	1–1	Harper	9,898
18.	19 January	Rangers	H	3–3	Jarvie, Scott, Smith	21,591
19.	22 January	Hibernian	A	0–0		11,480
20.	5 February	Partick Thistle	A	1–2	Jarvie	9,000
21.	7 February	Kilmarnock	H	2–0	McLelland, Graham	7,650
22.	19 February	Rangers	A	0–1		17,000
23.	5 March	Celtic	H	2–0	Graham, Harper	21,656
24.	12 March	Dundee United	H	0–1		12,620
25.	16 March	Dundee United	A	2–3	Smith, Harper	7,176
26.	19 March	Hearts	A	1–1	Fleming	8,000
27.	22 March	Motherwell	A	2–1	Davidson, Graham	7,849
28.	26 March	Ayr United	H	0–2		6,057
29.	2 April	Kilmarnock	A	2–1	Graham, Davidson	5,000
30.	5 April	Motherwell	A	1–1	Harper	5,523
31.	9 April	Hibernian	H	0–0		7,910
32.	13 April	Dundee United	A	3–2	Scott, Rougvie, Smith	4,500
33.	16 April	Partick Thistle	H	0–2		5,836
34.	20 April	Celtic	A	1–4	Jarvie	27,000
35.	23 April	Motherwell	A	3–1	Davidson (2), Graham	4,209
36.	30 April	Rangers	H	2–1	Harper, Davidson	13,484

==== Final standings ====
Pos	Team	Pld	W	D	L	GF	GA	GD	Pts	Qualification or relegation
1	Celtic (C)	36	23	9	4	79	39	+40	55	Qualification for the European Cup first round
2	Rangers	36	18	10	8	62	37	+25	46	Qualification for the Cup Winners' Cup first round
3	Aberdeen	36	16	11	9	56	42	+14	43	Qualification for the UEFA Cup first round
4	Dundee United	36	16	9	11	54	45	+9	41	Qualification for the UEFA Cup first round
5	Partick Thistle	36	11	13	12	40	44	−4	35	

Source: Statto
Rules for classification: 1) points; 2) goal difference; 3) number of goals scored.
(C) Champions

=== Scottish League Cup ===
==== Group stage ====
Round	Date	Opponent	H/A	Score	Aberdeen Scorer(s)	Attendance
G2	14 August	Kilmarnock	H	2–0	Harper, Graham	10,866
G2	18 August	St Mirren	A	3–2	Fleming (2), Harper	4,500
G2	21 August	Ayr United	H	1–0	Harper	9,695
G2	25 August	St Mirren	H	4–0	Harper (2), Williamson (2)	8,212
G2	28 August	Ayr United	A	1–1	Harper	4,800
G2	1 September	Kilmarnock	A	1–2	Harper	2,700

==== Group 2 final table ====
Team	Pld	W	D	L	GF	GA	GD	Pts
Aberdeen	6	4	1	1	12	5	+7	9
Ayr United	6	2	2	2	8	8	0	6
Kilmarnock	6	2	1	3	6	8	−2	5
St Mirren	6	1	2	3	7	12	−5	4

==== Knockout stage ====
Round	Date	Opponent	H/A	Score	Aberdeen Scorer(s)	Attendance
QF L1	22 September	Stirling Albion	H	1–0	Harper	7,185
QF L2	6 October	Stirling Albion	A	0–1		3,700
QFR	18 October	Stirling Albion	N	2–0	Scott, Smith	4,027
S-F	27 October	Rangers	N	5–1	Scott (3), Harper, Jarvie	20,900
Final	6 November	Celtic	N	2–1	Jarvie, Robb	69,679

=== Scottish Cup ===
Round	Date	Opponent	H/A	Score	Aberdeen Scorer(s)	Attendance
R3	29 January	Dunfermline	A	1–0	Harper	11,899
R4	26 February	Dundee	A	0–0		16,999
R4R	2 March	Dundee	H	1–2	Davidson	18,375

=== Anglo-Scottish Cup ===
Round	Date	Opponent	H/A	Score	Aberdeen Scorer(s)	Attendance
R1 L1	7 August	Dundee United	A	0–1		5,550
R1 L2	11 August	Dundee United	H	3–1	Harper (2), McCall	10,709
QF L1	15 September	Orient	H	0–1		10,000
QF L2	28 September	Orient	A	0–1		5,005

== Squad ==
=== Appearances & Goals ===
No.	Pos	Nat	Player	Total		Premier Division		Scottish Cup		League Cup	
No.	Pos	Nat	Player	Apps	Goals	Apps	Goals	Apps	Goals	Apps	Goals
	GK	(Scotland) SCO	Bobby Clark	38	0	27	0	3	0	8	0
	GK	(Scotland) SCO	Ally McLean	12	0	9	0	0	0	3	0
	GK	(Scotland) SCO	Jim Leighton	0	0	0	0	0	0	0	0
	DF	(Scotland) SCO	Willie Garner	50	0	36	0	3	0	11	0
	DF	(Scotland) SCO	Willie Miller (c)	47	0	36	0	3	0	8	0
	DF	(Scotland) SCO	Stuart Kennedy	45	1	32	1	3	0	10	0
	DF	(Scotland) SCO	Chic McLelland	37	1	25	1	3	0	9	0
	DF	(Scotland) SCO	Billy Williamson	16	3	9	1	0	0	7	2
	DF	(Scotland) SCO	Eddie Thomson	11	0	7	0	0	0	4	0
	DF	(Scotland) SCO	Doug Rougvie	6	1	6	1	0	0	0	0
	DF	(Scotland) SCO	Neil Cooper	3	0	0	0	0	0	3	0
	DF	(Scotland) SCO	Ian Hair	1	0	1	0	0	0	0	0
	MF	(Scotland) SCO	Arthur Graham	49	6	35	5	3	0	11	1
	MF	(Scotland) SCO	Joe Smith	49	4	35	3	3	0	11	1
	MF	(Scotland) SCO	Dom Sullivan	45	3	32	3	2	0	11	0
	MF	(Scotland) SCO	Jim Shirra	28	0	26	0	2	0	0	0
	MF	(Scotland) SCO	George Campbell	6	0	5	0	0	0	1	0
	MF	(Scotland) SCO	John McMaster	5	0	2	0	0	0	3	0
	MF	(Scotland) SCO	John Reilly	1	0	1	0	0	0	0	0
	FW	(Scotland) SCO	Joe Harper	48	28	34	18	3	1	11	9
	FW	(Scotland) SCO	Jocky Scott	29	7	19	3	2	0	8	4
	FW	(Scotland) SCO	Drew Jarvie	27	11	20	9	1	0	6	2
	FW	(Scotland) SCO	Ian Fleming	23	6	17	4	0	0	6	2
	FW	(Scotland) SCO	Dave Robb	19	2	13	1	2	0	4	1
	FW	(Scotland) SCO	Duncan Davidson	15	6	13	5	2	1	0	0
	FW	(Scotland) SCO	Ian Gibson	2	1	1	1	0	0	1	0
	FW	(Scotland) SCO	Walker McCall	0	0	0	0	0	0	0	0

=== Unofficial Appearances & Goals ===
No.	Pos	Nat	Player	Anglo-Scottish Cup	
No.	Pos	Nat	Player	Apps	Goals
	GK	(Scotland) SCO	Bobby Clark	2	0
	GK	(Scotland) SCO	Ally McLean	2	0
	DF	(Scotland) SCO	Willie Miller (c)	4	0
	DF	(Scotland) SCO	Chic McLelland	4	0
	DF	(Scotland) SCO	Willie Garner	4	0
	DF	(Scotland) SCO	Stuart Kennedy	2	0
	DF	(Scotland) SCO	Billy Williamson	1	0
	DF	(Scotland) SCO	Eddie Thomson	1	0
	MF	(Scotland) SCO	Joe Smith	4	0
	MF	(Scotland) SCO	Dom Sullivan	4	0
	MF	(Scotland) SCO	Arthur Graham	3	0
	MF	(Scotland) SCO	John McMaster	2	0
	FW	(Scotland) SCO	Joe Harper	4	2
	FW	(Scotland) SCO	Ian Fleming	4	0
	FW	(Scotland) SCO	Dave Robb	3	0
	FW	(Scotland) SCO	Jocky Scott	2	0
	FW	(Scotland) SCO	Walker McCall	1	1
