= 1975–76 Aberdeen F.C. season =

Aberdeen F.C.
1975–76 season
- Chairman: Dick Donald
- Manager: Jimmy Bonthrone (until 13 October); George Murray (caretaker manager); Ally MacLeod (from 3 November)
- Scottish Premier Division: 7th
- Scottish Cup: Fourth round
- Scottish League Cup: Group Stage
- Anglo-Scottish Cup: Quarter-finalist
- Top goalscorer: League: Jocky Scott (14); All: Jocky Scott (16)
- Highest home attendance: 19,565 vs. Rangers, 6 December 1975
- Lowest home attendance: 4,500 vs. Ayr United, 27 September 1975
- Average home league attendance: 10,947
Home colours

== Results ==
=== Scottish Premier Division ===
Match Day	Date	Opponent	H/A	Score	Aberdeen Scorer(s)	Attendance
1.	30 August	Dundee	A	2–3	Smith, Williamson	6,067
2.	6 September	Motherwell	H	2–2	Robb (2), Williamson	5,500
3.	13 September	Dundee United	H	1–3	Scott	5,500
4.	20 September	Hearts	A	2–2	Scott, Williamson	9,500
5.	27 September	Ayr United	H	3–1	Scott (2), Williamson	4,500
6.	4 October	Rangers	A	0–1		22,000
7.	11 October	Celtic	H	1–2	Scott	17,900
8.	18 October	St Johnstone	H	2–0	Pirie (2)	5,100
9.	25 October	Hibernian	A	1–3	Robb	11,133
10.	1 November	Dundee	H	2–0	Scott, Williamson	6,312
11.	8 November	Motherwell	A	0–3		6,294
12.	15 November	Dundee United	A	2–1	Williamson, Scott	4,704
13.	22 November	Hearts	H	0–0		11,390
14.	29 November	Ayr United	A	0–1		6,000
15.	6 December	Rangers	H	1–0	Jarvie	19,565
16.	13 December	Celtic	A	2–0	Jarvie, Graham	24,000
17.	20 December	St Johnstone	A	1–1	Williamson	3,500
18.	27 December	Hibernian	H	2–2	McMaster, Williamson	17,630
19.	1 January	Dundee	A	3–1	Robb, Scott, Graham	10,009
20.	3 January	Motherwell	H	0–0		16,177
21.	10 January	Dundee United	H	5–3	Scott (3), Graham	9,581
22.	17 January	Hearts	A	3–3	McMaster, Scott, Pirie	10,300
23.	31 January	Ayr United	H	2–1	Pirie, McMaster	9.920
24.	7 February	Rangers	A	1–2	Pirie	30,000
25.	21 February	Celtic	H	0–1		18,221
26.	28 February	St Johnstone	H	3–0	Pirie (2), Scott	5,920
27.	13 March	Dundee	H	0–1		6,460
28.	20 March	Motherwell	A	1–2	Fleming	5,908
29.	27 March	Dundee United	A	0–1		4,875
30.	31 March	Hibernian	A	2–3	Scott, Fleming	4,082
31.	7 April	Hearts	H	0–3		8,500
32.	10 April	Ayr United	A	1–1	Jarvie	5,700
33.	14 April	Rangers	H	0–0		17,968
34.	17 April	Celtic	A	1–1	Eðvaldsson	29,000
35.	21 April	St Johnstone	A	0–2	Davidson (2), Graham	2,500
36.	24 April	Hibernian	H	3–0	Jarvie, Smith, Robb	10,895

==== Final standings ====
Pos	Team	Pld	W	D	L	GF	GA	GD	Pts	Qualification or relegation
5	Heart of Midlothian	36	13	9	14	39	45	−6	35	Qualification for the Cup Winners' Cup first round
6	Ayr United	36	14	5	17	46	59	−13	33	
7	Aberdeen	36	11	10	15	49	50	−1	32	
8	Dundee United	36	12	8	16	46	48	−2	32	
9	Dundee (R)	36	11	10	15	49	62	−13	32	Relegation to the 1976–77 Scottish First Division

Source: Statto
Rules for classification: 1) points; 2) goal difference; 3) number of goals scored.
(R) Relegated

=== Scottish League Cup ===
==== Group stage ====
Round	Date	Opponent	H/A	Score	Aberdeen Scorer(s)	Attendance
G3	9 August	Celtic	A	0–1		32,000
G3	13 August	Dumbarton	H	2–0	Graham, Jarvie	6,000
G3	16 August	Hearts	H	1–2	Williamson	8,400
G3	20 August	Dumbarton	A	1–0	Hair	2,400
G3	23 August	Hearts	A	0–1		11,000
G3	27 August	Celtic	H	0–2		13,000

==== Group 3 final table ====
Team	Pld	W	D	L	GF	GA	GD	Pts
Celtic	6	5	0	1	17	4	+13	10
Heart of Midlothian	6	4	0	2	13	8	+5	8
Aberdeen	6	2	0	4	4	6	−2	4
Dumbarton	6	1	0	5	5	21	−16	2

=== Scottish Cup ===
Round	Date	Opponent	H/A	Score	Aberdeen Scorer(s)	Attendance
R3	24 January	Alloa Athletic	A	4–0	Scott, McMaster, Miller, Robb	6,312
R4	14 February	Rangers	A	1–4	Smith	52,000

=== Anglo-Scottish Cup ===
Round	Date	Opponent	H/A	Score	Aberdeen Scorer(s)	Attendance
R1 L1	30 July	St Johnstone	H	1–1	Jarvie	
R1 L2	6 August	St Johnstone	A	2–0	Rougvie, Campbell	
QF L1	16 September	Middlesbrough	A	0–2		
QF L2	1 October	Middlesbrough	H	2–5	Scott, Robb	9,000

== Squad ==
=== Appearances & Goals ===
No.	Pos	Nat	Player	Total		Premier Division		Scottish Cup		League Cup	
No.	Pos	Nat	Player	Apps	Goals	Apps	Goals	Apps	Goals	Apps	Goals
	GK	(Scotland) SCO	Bobby Clark	26	0	20	0	0	0	6	0
	GK	(Scotland) SCO	Andy Geoghegan	18	0	16	0	2	0	0	0
	GK	(Scotland) SCO	Jim George	0	0	0	0	0	0	0	0
	DF	(Scotland) SCO	Willie Miller (c)	44	1	36	0	2	1	6	0
	DF	(Scotland) SCO	Billy Williamson	42	9	36	8	2	0	4	1
	DF	(Scotland) SCO	Chic McLelland	38	0	30	0	2	0	6	0
	DF	(Scotland) SCO	Ian Hair	37	1	30	0	1	0	6	1
	DF	(Scotland) SCO	Eddie Thomson	31	0	28	0	1	0	2	0
	DF	(Scotland) SCO	Willie Young (c)	9	0	3	0	0	0	6	0
	DF	(Scotland) SCO	Willie Garner	9	0	8	0	1	0	0	0
	DF	(Scotland) SCO	Doug Rougvie	7	0	2	0	0	0	5	0
	DF	(Northern Ireland) NIR	Noel Ward	5	0	5	0	0	0	0	0
	DF	(Scotland) SCO	Neil Cooper	2	0	2	0	0	0	0	0
	MF	(Scotland) SCO	Joe Smith	41	3	33	2	2	1	6	0
	MF	(Scotland) SCO	Arthur Graham	38	5	31	4	2	0	5	1
	MF	(Scotland) SCO	John McMaster	24	4	21	3	2	1	1	0
	MF	(Scotland) SCO	George Campbell	4	0	2	0	0	0	2	0
	MF	(Scotland) SCO	Jim Henry	2	0	1	0	0	0	1	0
	MF	(Scotland) SCO	John Docherty	1	0	1	0	0	0	0	0
	MF	(Scotland) SCO	John Hather	1	0	1	0	0	0	0	0
	FW	(Scotland) SCO	Dave Robb	40	5	32	4	2	1	6	0
	FW	(Scotland) SCO	Drew Jarvie	38	5	32	4	2	0	4	1
	FW	(Scotland) SCO	Jocky Scott	37	15	32	14	2	1	3	0
	FW	(Scotland) SCO	Billy Pirie	22	7	18	7	1	0	3	0
	FW	(Scotland) SCO	Ian Fleming	12	2	12	2	0	0	0	0
	FW	(Scotland) SCO	Ian Gibson	4	0	2	0	0	0	2	0
	FW	(Scotland) SCO	Walker McCall	2	0	2	0	0	0	0	0
	FW	(Scotland) SCO	Bobby Street	1	0	1	0	0	0	0	0
	FW	(Scotland) SCO	Duncan Davidson	0	0	0	0	0	0	0	0
	FW	(Scotland) SCO	Joe Harper	0	0	0	0	0	0	0	0

=== Unofficial Appearances & Goals ===
No.	Pos	Nat	Player	Anglo-Scottish Cup	
No.	Pos	Nat	Player	Apps	Goals
	GK	(Scotland) SCO	Bobby Clark	2	0
	GK	(Scotland) SCO	Andy Geoghegan	2	0
	DF	(Scotland) SCO	Willie Miller (c)	4	0
	DF	(Scotland) SCO	Chic McLelland	4	0
	DF	(Scotland) SCO	Ian Hair	4	0
	DF	(Scotland) SCO	Billy Williamson	3	0
	DF	(Scotland) SCO	Willie Young (c)	2	0
	DF	(Northern Ireland) NIR	Noel Ward	2	0
	DF	(Scotland) SCO	Eddie Thomson	2	0
	DF	(Scotland) SCO	Doug Rougvie	1	1
	MF	(Scotland) SCO	Arthur Graham	4	0
	MF	(Scotland) SCO	Joe Smith	4	0
	MF	(Scotland) SCO	George Campbell	1	1
	MF	(Scotland) SCO	Jim Henry	1	0
	FW	(Scotland) SCO	Drew Jarvie	4	1
	FW	(Scotland) SCO	Dave Robb	4	1
	FW	(Scotland) SCO	Jocky Scott	2	1
	FW	(Scotland) SCO	Billy Pirie	1	0
