= 1974–75 Aberdeen F.C. season =

Aberdeen F.C.
1974–75 season
- Chairman: Dick Donald
- Manager: Jimmy Bonthrone
- Scottish First Division: 5th
- Scottish Cup: Fourth round
- Scottish League Cup: Group Stage
- Texaco Cup: Quarter-finalist
- Top goalscorer: League: Arthur Graham (11); All: Arthur Graham (12)
- Highest home attendance: 30,000 vs. Rangers, 25 January 1975
- Lowest home attendance: 3,300 vs. Clyde, 19 April 1975
- Average home league attendance: 9.341
Home colours

During the 1974–75 season, the Scottish football club Aberdeen F.C. was placed fifth in the Scottish First Division. The team reached the quarterfinal round of the Scottish Cup.

== Results ==
=== Scottish First Division ===
Match Day	Date	Opponent	H/A	Score	Aberdeen Scorer(s)	Attendance
1.	31 August	Hibernian	H	2–3	Purdie, Pirie	13,000
2.	7 September	Dundee	A	1–0	Purdie	6,396
3.	14 September	St Johnstone	H	3–1	Jarvie, Hair, Graham	7,000
4.	21 September	Kilmarnock	A	0–1		5,000
5.	28 September	Airdrieonians	H	1–0	Young	5,000
6.	5 October	Hearts	A	4–1	Purdie, Graham, Smith, McCall	8,500
7.	12 October	Ayr United	H	3–0	Jarvie, Purdie, McCall	6,000
8.	19 October	Dumbarton	A	3–2	McCall, Purdie, Graham	4,000
9.	26 October	Arbroath	H	5–1	Williamson (2), McCall (2), Purdie	7,000
10.	2 November	Celtic	A	0–1		21,000
11.	9 November	Partick Thistle	H	1–1	Purdie	8,000
12.	16 November	Morton	H	3–3	McCall, Young, Graham	7,500
13.	27 November	Dundee United	A	0–4		8,000
14.	30 November	Motherwell	A	1–2	Graham	3,472
15.	7 December	Rangers	H	1–2	Hair	25,000
16.	14 December	Clyde	A	1–1	Purdie	2,053
17.	21 December	Dunfermline Athletic	H	1–1	Hair	5,000
18.	28 December	Hibernian	A	1–0	Pirie	13,190
19.	1 January	Dundee	H	4–0	Caldwell, Pirie, Jarvie, Hair	12,000
20.	4 January	St Johnstone	A	1–1	Davidson	4,500
21.	11 January	Kilmarnock	H	4–0	Jarvie, Young, Pirie, Graham	8,500
22.	1 February	Hearts	H	2–2	McLelland, Jarvie	11,000
23.	8 February	Ayr United	A	0–2		5,000
24.	15 February	Dumbarton	H	1–1	Graham	9,000
25.	1 March	Arbroath	A	2–1	Davidson, Graham	3,113
26.	4 March	Airdrieonians	A	2–2	Graham, Davidson	4,000
27.	12 March	Celtic	H	3–2	Williamson (3)	15,500
28.	15 March	Partick Thistle	A	0–1		5,000
29.	22 March	Morton	A	3–0	Robb, Williamson, Graham	2,500
30.	29 March	Dundee United	H	2–0	Williamson, Hermiston	8,000
31.	12 April	Rangers	A	2–3	Williamson, Hermiston	40,000
32.	19 April	Clyde	H	4–1	Jarvie (2), Hermiston, Miller	3,300
33.	23 April	Motherwell	H	2–2	Jarvie, Graham	8,000
34.	26 April	Dunfermline Athletic	A	3–1	Robb (3)	3,500

==== Final standings ====
Pos	Team	Pld	W	D	L	GF	GA	GD	Pts	Qualification
3	Celtic	34	20	5	9	81	41	+40	45	Qualification to European Cup Winners' Cup First round
4	Dundee United	34	19	7	8	72	43	+29	45	Qualification to UEFA Cup First round
5	Aberdeen	34	16	9	9	66	43	+23	41	
6	Dundee	34	16	6	12	48	42	+6	38	
7	Ayr United	34	14	8	12	50	61	−11	36	

Source: Soccerbase and League Tables

=== Scottish League Cup ===
==== Group stage ====
Round	Date	Opponent	H/A	Score	Aberdeen Scorer(s)	Attendance
G3	10 August	Hearts	H	0–1		11,000
G3	14 August	Morton	A	1–3	Hermiston	2,000
G3	17 August	Dunfermline Athletic	A	1–1	Jarvie	4,500
G3	21 August	Morton	H	4–0	Purdie, Thomson, Jarvie, Young	5,000
G3	24 August	Dunfermline Athletic	H	3–0	Jarvie Williamson, Purdie	7,000
G3	28 August	Hearts	A	1–2	Hermiston	14,000

==== Group 3 final table ====
Team	Pld	W	D	L	GF	GA	GD	Pts
Heart of Midlothian	6	4	0	2	13	6	+7	8
Dunfermline Athletic	6	2	3	1	8	9	−1	7
Aberdeen	6	2	1	3	10	7	+3	5
Morton	6	1	2	3	5	14	−9	4

=== Scottish Cup ===
Round	Date	Opponent	H/A	Score	Aberdeen Scorer(s)	Attendance
R3	25 January	Rangers	H	1–1	Miller	30,000
R3R	10 February	Rangers	A	2–1	Graham, Davidson	52,000
R3R	19 February	Dundee United	A	1–0	Jarvie	22,000
Q-F	8 March	Motherwell	H	0–1		23,400

=== Texaco Cup ===
Round	Date	Opponent	H/A	Score	Aberdeen Scorer(s)	Attendance
QF L1	18 September	Newcastle United	H	1–1	Young	13,500
QF L2	2 October	Newcastle United	A	2–3	Pirie, McDermott	18,838

== Squad ==
=== Appearances & Goals ===
No.	Pos	Nat	Player	Total		Division One		Scottish Cup		League Cup	
No.	Pos	Nat	Player	Apps	Goals	Apps	Goals	Apps	Goals	Apps	Goals
	GK	(Scotland) SCO	Bobby Clark	41	0	33	0	4	0	4	0
	GK	(Scotland) SCO	Andy Geoghegan	3	0	1	0	0	0	2	0
	DF	(Scotland) SCO	Willie Miller	44	2	34	1	4	1	6	0
	DF	(Scotland) SCO	Chic McLelland	43	1	33	1	4	0	6	0
	DF	(Scotland) SCO	Willie Young (c)	39	4	31	3	4	0	4	1
	DF	(Scotland) SCO	Billy Williamson	37	10	31	9	4	0	2	1
	DF	(Scotland) SCO	Ian Hair	35	4	27	4	4	0	4	0
	DF	(Scotland) SCO	Eddie Thomson	25	1	17	0	4	0	4	1
	DF	(Scotland) SCO	Jim Hermiston	21	5	15	3	0	0	6	2
	DF	(Northern Ireland) NIR	Noel Ward	2	0	2	0	0	0	0	0
	DF	(Scotland) SCO	Neil Cooper	1	0	1	0	0	0	0	0
	DF	(Scotland) SCO	Doug Rougvie	0	0	0	0	0	0	0	0
	MF	(Scotland) SCO	Arthur Graham	44	12	34	11	4	1	6	0
	MF	(Scotland) SCO	Ian Purdie	37	9	27	7	4	0	6	2
	MF	(Scotland) SCO	Joe Smith	35	1	26	1	3	0	6	0
	MF	(Scotland) SCO	Jim Henry	16	0	11	0	4	0	1	0
	MF	(Scotland) SCO	John McMaster	3	0	1	0	0	0	2	0
	MF	(Scotland) SCO	George Campbell	3	0	1	0	0	0	2	0
	FW	(Scotland) SCO	Drew Jarvie	42	13	32	9	4	1	6	3
	FW	(Scotland) SCO	Duncan Davidson	22	3	16	2	3	1	3	0
	FW	(Scotland) SCO	Walker McCall	15	6	14	6	0	0	1	0
	FW	(Scotland) SCO	Billy Pirie	14	4	11	4	0	0	3	0
	FW	(Scotland) SCO	John Craig	8	0	8	0	0	0	0	0
	FW	(Scotland) SCO	Dave Robb	6	4	6	4	0	0	0	0
	FW	(Scotland) SCO	Bobby Street	3	0	3	0	0	0	0	0

=== Unofficial Appearances & Goals ===
No.	Pos	Nat	Player	Texaco Cup	
No.	Pos	Nat	Player	Apps	Goals
	GK	(Scotland) SCO	Bobby Clark	2	0
	DF	(Scotland) SCO	Willie Young (c)	2	1
	DF	(Scotland) SCO	Willie Miller	2	0
	DF	(Scotland) SCO	Chic McLelland	2	0
	DF	(Scotland) SCO	Jim Hermiston	1	0
	DF	(Scotland) SCO	Eddie Thomson	1	0
	DF	(Scotland) SCO	Ian Hair	1	0
	DF	(Scotland) SCO	Billy Williamson	1	0
	MF	(Scotland) SCO	Arthur Graham	2	0
	MF	(Scotland) SCO	Joe Smith	2	0
	MF	(Scotland) SCO	Ian Purdie	2	0
	FW	(Scotland) SCO	Drew Jarvie	2	0
	FW	(Scotland) SCO	Billy Pirie	1	1
	FW	(Scotland) SCO	John Craig	1	0
