= Arthur Graham =

Scottish footballer

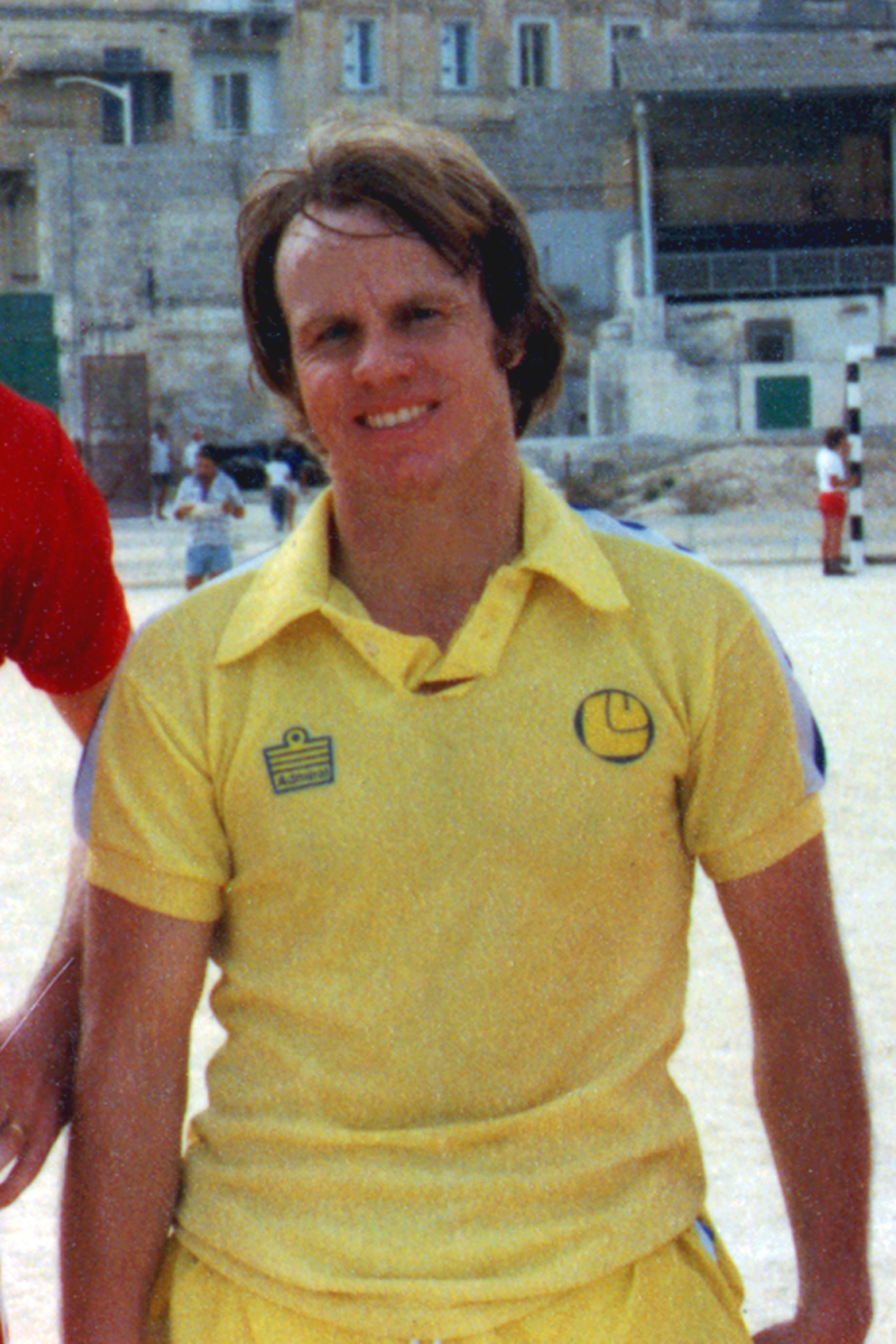
- Graham in 1979

Personal information
- Full name: Arthur Graham
- Date of birth: 26 October 1952 (age 73)
- Place of birth: Glasgow, Scotland
- Height: 1.70 m (5 ft 7 in)
- Position: Left winger

Senior career*
Years	Team	Apps	(Gls)
1968–1970	Cambuslang Rangers		
1970–1977	Aberdeen	220	(34)
1977–1983	Leeds United	223	(37)
1983–1985	Manchester United	37	(5)
1985–1987	Bradford City	31	(2)
Total		511	(78)

International career
1974–1975	Scotland U23	3	(0)
1977–1981	Scotland	11	(2)
- * Club domestic league appearances and goals

Arthur Graham (born 26 October 1952) is a Scottish former professional footballer who played as a left winger for Aberdeen, Leeds United, Manchester United, Bradford City and the Scotland national team.

== Club career ==
Graham was raised in the Castlemilk district of Glasgow. One of 11 siblings, he attended St Margaret Mary's Secondary School and supported Celtic as a child. Ray Houghton, who would also become an international footballer, was a downstairs neighbour in the same tenement block.

After a short spell in the Junior grade with Cambuslang Rangers (which had quickly escalated from a casual kickaround with workmates at the nearby steel works), in early 1970 he was signed by Aberdeen whose scout Bobby Calder offered generous terms to persuade him to move north with Celtic also showing interest. He played in five league matches during his first season with the club, and despite his inexperience, he was given a place in the starting line-up for the 1970 Scottish Cup Final by manager Eddie Turnbull. Aberdeen defeated Celtic 3–1 with 17-year-old Graham making two assists via left-wing crosses. He remained at Aberdeen until July 1977, winning the Scottish League Cup in his final season (again beating Celtic in the final). He played a total of 298 matches for The Dons, scoring 45 goals.

He joined Leeds United for £125,000 at the start of the 1977–78 season. He scored a total of 47 goals in 260 appearances for Leeds over six seasons, including a hat-trick against Birmingham City on 14 January 1978 - the first hat-trick to be scored by a Leeds United player in any competition for nearly five years.

However, Leeds were relegated to the Second Division in the 1981–82 season and failed to regain their status in the top flight in 1982–83. Graham was subsequently sold to Manchester United for £45,000 in August 1983.

He remained at Old Trafford for two seasons, scoring seven goals in 52 appearances in all competitions, before finishing his career at Bradford City where he remained until 1987.

== International career ==
Having been capped at under-23 level at Aberdeen, Graham's international career seemed to be over prematurely when he was one of a group of squad players (including Billy Bremner and Joe Harper) 'banned for life' after an incident in Copenhagen in 1975. He was later reprieved, and won a total of 11 full international caps for Scotland while playing for Leeds, making his debut against East Germany in 1977. He scored twice at international level, against Argentina and Northern Ireland – both in 1979.

== Personal life and post-playing activities ==
Graham has five children: Angela, Lucy, Daniel, James and Helen Graham. He cited Jimmy Johnstone as his favourite player and Aberdeen as one of his favourite teams. He said Danny McGrain was his most difficult opponent. He said that beating Celtic in the 1970 Scottish Cup Final was his most memorable moment and cited being banned by Scotland as his biggest disappointment. He cited his schoolteacher, Eddie Turnbull, Teddy Scott, Jimmy Bonthrone and Ally MacLeod as having the biggest influences on his career. He enjoys golf, television and pop music and said that he disliked waiting for various things. He said Top of the Pops was his favourite television show and said the Beatles and Elton John are his favourite musicians. He said that if he was not a football player, he would have just stayed a football fan.

Graham has spent time coaching youngsters at the Leeds United Academy and at football schools in the Wetherby area where he settled – often working with Jimmy Lumsden.

His younger brothers Jimmy and Tommy were also footballers.

== In popular culture ==
Graham is frequently mentioned in the letters page of the comic Viz. In every edition, there will be a recommendation from a 'reader' that Graham is the only man to be considered for a range of positions. Graham has been recommended for a host of unlikely positions, such as taking over from Jeremy Clarkson as host of Top Gear, mediating peace negotiations between Russia and Ukraine, taking the editor's position at the London Evening Standard ahead of George Osborne, and presenting The Great British Bake Off.

== Career statistics ==
=== Club ===
Appearances and goals by club, season and competition
Club	Seasons	League			National Cup		League Cup		Europe		Other		Total	
Club	Seasons	Division	Apps	Goals	Apps	Goals	Apps	Goals	Apps	Goals	Apps	Goals	Apps	Goals
Cambuslang Rangers	Central League	1968–69	-	-	-	-	-	-	-	-	-	-	-	-
Cambuslang Rangers	Central League	1969–70	-	-	-	-	-	-	-	-	-	-	-	-
Cambuslang Rangers	Total		-	-	-	-	-	-	-	-	-	-	-	-
Aberdeen	Scottish Division One	1969–70	5	2	1	0	0	0	0	0	-	-	6	2
Aberdeen	Scottish Division One	1970–71	31	5	4	0	5	0	2	1	-	-	42	6
Aberdeen	Scottish Division One	1971–72	29	4	3	0	6	3	3	0	-	-	41	7
Aberdeen	Scottish Division One	1972–73	23	0	4	0	2	1	2	0	-	-	31	1
Aberdeen	Scottish Division One	1973–74	32	3	1	0	9	3	4	1	-	-	46	7
Aberdeen	Scottish Division One	1974–75	34	11	4	1	6	0	0	0	-	-	44	12
Aberdeen	Scottish Premier Division	1975–76	31	4	2	0	5	1	0	0	-	-	38	5
Aberdeen	Scottish Premier Division	1976–77	35	5	3	0	11	1	0	0	-	-	49	6
Aberdeen	Total		220	34	22	1	44	9	11	2	-	-	297	46
Leeds United	First Division	1977–78	40	9	1	0	6	3	0	0	-	-	47	12
Leeds United	First Division	1978–79	39	8	3	2	7	0	0	0	-	-	49	10
Leeds United	First Division	1979–80	27	3	0	0	2	0	3	3	-	-	32	5
Leeds United	First Division	1980–81	40	3	2	0	2	1	0	0	-	-	44	4
Leeds United	First Division	1981–82	38	9	2	0	2	0	0	0	-	-	42	9
Leeds United	Second Division	1982–83	39	5	4	1	3	0	0	0	-	-	46	6
Leeds United	Total		223	37	12	3	22	4	3	3	-	-	260	47
Manchester United	First Division	1983–84	37	5	1	0	5	1	7	1	1	0	51	7
Manchester United	First Division	1984–85	0	0	0	0	1	0	0	0	-	-	1	0
Manchester United	Total		37	5	1	0	6	1	7	1	1	0	52	7
Bradford City	Second Division	1985–86	25	2	-	-	-	-	-	-	-	-	25	2
Bradford City	Second Division	1986–87	6	0	-	-	-	-	-	-	-	-	6	0
Bradford City	Total		31	2	-	-	-	-	-	-	-	-	31+	2+
Career total			511	78	35+	4+	72+	14+	21+	6+	1	0	640+	102+

=== International ===
Appearances and goals by national team and year
National team	Year	Apps	Goals
Scotland	1977	1	0
Scotland	1978	2	0
Scotland	1979	7	2
Scotland	1980	—	
Scotland	1981	1	0
Total		11	2

Scores and results list Scotland's goal tally first, score column indicates score after each Graham goal

List of international goals scored by Arthur Graham
No.	Date	Venue	Opponent	Score	Result	Competition
1.	22 May 1979	Hampden Park, Glasgow, Scotland	Northern Ireland	1–0	1–0	British Home Championship
2.	2 June 1979	Hampden Park, Glasgow, Scotland	Argentina	1–3	1–3	Friendly

== Honours ==
Aberdeen

- Scottish Cup: 1969–70
- Scottish League Cup: 1976–77

Manchester United

- FA Charity Shield: 1983
