= 1972–73 Aberdeen F.C. season =

Aberdeen F.C.
1972–73 season
- Chairman: Dick Donald
- Manager: Jimmy Bonthrone
- Scottish First Division: 4th
- Scottish Cup: Quarter-finalists
- Scottish League Cup: Semi-finalists
- UEFA Cup: First Round
- Drybrough Cup: Semi-finalists
- Top goalscorer: League: Drew Jarvie (15); All: Joe Harper (29)
- Highest home attendance: 34,262 vs. Celtic, 28 October 1972
- Lowest home attendance: 6,500 vs. Airdrieonians, 7 April 1973
- Average home league attendance: 13,087
Home colours

== Results ==
=== Scottish First Division ===
Match Day	Date	Opponent	H/A	Score	Aberdeen Scorer(s)	Attendance
1.	2 September	Hibernian	H	1–0	Harper	16,947
2.	9 September	Dundee	A	0–0		10,100
3.	16 September	St Johnstone	H	0–0		9,917
4.	23 September	Dumbarton	A	2–1	Jarvie, Harper	6,854
5.	30 September	Motherwell	H	7–2	Harper (4), Robb, Jarvie, Murray	11,351
6.	7 October	Hearts	A	1–2	Harper	11,763
7.	14 October	Falkirk	H	2–2	Taylor (2)	14,165
8.	21 October	Ayr United	A	3–2	Harper (2), Jarvie	7,823
9.	28 October	Celtic	H	2–3	Varga (2)	34,262
10.	4 November	Partick Thistle	A	2–0	Harper (2), B. Miller	8,962
11.	11 November	East Fife	H	4–3	Jarvie, Willoughby, McQuade (Own Goal), Robb	10,651
12.	18 November	Kilmarnock	H	3–0	Taylor, Harper, Jarvie	10,234
13.	25 November	Dundee United	A	2–3	Varga, Murray	8,173
14.	2 December	Airdrieonians	A	1–1	Murray	4,059
15.	9 December	Arbroath	H	0–0		8,354
16.	16 December	Rangers	A	0–0		26,375
17.	23 December	Morton	H	3–0	Varga (2), Mitchell	7,031
18.	30 December	Hibernian	A	2–3	Jarvie, B. Miller	21,279
19.	1 January	Dundee	H	3–1	Hermiston, Varga, Jarvie	13,576
20.	27 January	Hearts	H	3–1	Jarvie (2), Varga	13,282
21.	7 February	Motherwell	A	0–2		4,000
22.	10 February	Falkirk	A	0–0		4,897
23.	17 February	Ayr United	H	1–0	Jarvie	8,538
24.	20 February	Dumbarton	H	6–0	Purdie (2), Forrest, Jenkins (Own Goal), Varga, Jarvie	7,852
25.	3 March	Celtic	A	0–2		36,425
26.	7 March	St Johnstone	A	0–1		4,389
27.	10 March	Partick Thistle	H	0–0		8,994
28.	24 March	Kilmarnock	A	2–0	Robb, Young	4,000
29.	27 March	East Fife	A	1–0	Varga	4,594
30.	31 March	Dundee United	H	0–0		8,831
31.	7 April	Airdrieonians	H	5–1	Jarvie (3), Robb, Murray	6,500
32.	14 April	Arbroath	A	1–1	Varga	4,757
33.	21 April	Rangers	H	2–2	Hermiston, Taylor	32,000
34.	28 April	Morton	A	2–1	Young, Jarvie	3,000

==== Final standings ====
Pos	Team	Pld	W	D	L	GF	GA	GD	Pts
2	Rangers	34	26	4	4	74	30	+44	56
3	Hibernian	34	19	7	8	74	33	+41	45
4	Aberdeen	34	16	11	7	61	34	+27	43
5	Dundee	34	17	9	8	68	43	+25	43
6	Ayr United	34	16	8	10	50	51	−1	40

Source: Soccerbase and League Tables

=== Drybrough Cup ===
Round	Date	Opponent	H/A	Score	Aberdeen Scorer(s)	Attendance
QF	29 July	St Mirren	H	1–0	Harper	16,000
SF	2 August	Celtic	A	2–3	Buchan (2)	40,000

=== Scottish League Cup ===
==== Group stage ====
Round	Date	Opponent	H/A	Score	Aberdeen Scorer(s)	Attendance
G2	12 August	Queen of the South	A	4–0	Buchan, Jarvie, Hermiston, Robb	4,673
G2	16 August	Hibernian	H	4–1	Jarvie (2), Harper (2)	20,673
G2	19 August	Queen's Park	H	5–1	Young (2), Harper (2), Jarvie	11,464
G2	23 August	Hibernian	A	1–2	Jarvie	17,133
G2	26 August	Queen of the South	H	2–1	Taylor, Purdie	10,144
G2	30 August	Queen's Park	A	3–0	Harper (3)	1,029

==== Group 2 final table ====
Team	Pld	W	D	L	GF	GA	GD	Pts
Aberdeen	6	5	0	1	19	5	+14	10
Hibernian	6	5	0	1	14	8	+6	10
Queen of the South	6	2	0	4	5	13	−8	4
Queen's Park	6	0	0	6	4	16	−12	0

==== Knockout stage ====
Round	Date	Opponent	H/A	Score	Aberdeen Scorer(s)	Attendance
R2 L1	20 September	Falkirk	H	8–0	Harper (3), Jarvie (2), Forrest, Graham, Robb	9,939
R2 L2	4 October	Falkirk	A	2–3	Harper (2)	4,000
QF L1	11 October	East Fife	H	3–0	Taylor, Jarvie, Harper	13,605
QF L2	1 November	East Fife	A	4–1	Jarvie (2), Harper, Clarke (Own Goal)	4,492
SF	27 November	Celtic	N	2–3	Harper, Robb	39,682

=== Scottish Cup ===
Round	Date	Opponent	H/A	Score	Aberdeen Scorer(s)	Attendance
R3	3 February	Brechin City	A	4–2	Mitchell (2), Jarvie, Milne (Own goal)	8,123
R4	28 February	Falkirk	H	3–1	Forrest, Purdie, Murray	17,730
QF	17 March	Celtic	A	0–0		40,032
QFR	21 March	Celtic	H	0–1		33,465

=== UEFA Cup ===
Round	Date	Opponent	H/A	Score	Aberdeen Scorer(s)	Attendance
R1 L1	13 September	(West Germany) Borussia Mönchengladbach	H	2–3	Harper, Jarvie	21,000
R1 L2	27 September	(West Germany) Borussia Mönchengladbach	A	3–6	Jarvie, Willoughby, Murray	19,000

== Squad ==
=== Appearances & Goals ===
No.	Pos	Nat	Player	Total		Division One		Scottish Cup		League Cup		UEFA Cup	
No.	Pos	Nat	Player	Apps	Goals	Apps	Goals	Apps	Goals	Apps	Goals	Apps	Goals
	GK	(Scotland) SCO	Bobby Clark	49	0	33	0	4	0	11	0	1	0
	GK	(Scotland) SCO	Andy Geoghegan	2	0	1	0	0	0	0	0	1	0
	DF	(Scotland) SCO	Jim Hermiston	50	3	33	2	4	0	11	1	2	0
	DF	(Scotland) SCO	Willie Young	47	4	30	2	4	0	11	2	2	0
	DF	(Scotland) SCO	Billy Williamson	16	0	13	0	3	0	0	0	0	0
	DF	(Denmark) DEN	Henning Boel	13	0	7	0	0	0	4	0	2	0
	DF	(Scotland) SCO	Eddie Thomson	7	0	7	0	0	0	0	0	0	0
	DF	(Scotland) SCO	Willie Miller	1	0	1	0	0	0	0	0	0	0
	DF	(Scotland) SCO	Tommy McMillan	0	0	0	0	0	0	0	0	0	0
	MF	(Scotland) SCO	Steve Murray (c)	44	6	29	4	3	1	11	0	1	1
	MF	(Scotland) SCO	Alex Willoughby	37	2	25	1	1	0	9	0	2	1
	MF	(Hungary) HUN	Zoltan Varga	31	10	26	10	3	0	2	0	0	0
	MF	(Scotland) SCO	Ian Taylor	31	6	18	4	1	0	10	2	2	0
	MF	(Scotland) SCO	Arthur Graham	31	1	23	0	4	0	2	1	2	0
	MF	(Scotland) SCO	Bertie Miller	26	2	17	2	2	0	6	0	1	0
	MF	(Scotland) SCO	Joe Smith	17	0	14	0	3	0	0	0	0	0
	MF	(Scotland) SCO	George Murray	14	0	7	0	0	0	6	0	1	0
	MF	(Scotland) SCO	George Buchan	13	1	8	0	1	0	4	1	0	0
	MF	(Scotland) SCO	Ian Purdie	6	4	3	2	1	1	2	1	0	0
	MF	(Scotland) SCO	Jimmy Miller	0	0	0	0	0	0	0	0	0	0
	FW	(Scotland) SCO	Drew Jarvie	51	28	34	15	4	1	11	10	2	2
	FW	(Scotland) SCO	Dave Robb	33	7	19	4	2	0	10	3	2	0
	FW	(Scotland) SCO	Joe Harper	26	27	13	11	0	0	11	15	2	1
	FW	(Scotland) SCO	Jim Forrest	19	3	11	1	3	1	4	1	1	0
	FW	(Scotland) SCO	Barrie Mitchell	14	3	12	1	1	2	1	0	0	0
	FW	(Scotland) SCO	Tommy Wilson	11	0	9	0	2	0	0	0	0	0
	FW	(Scotland) SCO	Bobby Street	2	0	2	0	0	0	0	0	0	0
	FW	(Scotland) SCO	John Craig	0	0	0	0	0	0	0	0	0	0

=== Unofficial Appearances & Goals ===
No.	Pos	Nat	Player	Drybrough Cup	
No.	Pos	Nat	Player	Apps	Goals
	GK	(Scotland) SCO	Bobby Clark	2	0
	DF	(Denmark) DEN	Henning Boel	2	0
	DF	(Scotland) SCO	Jim Hermiston	2	0
	DF	(Scotland) SCO	Willie Young	2	0
	MF	(Scotland) SCO	Steve Murray (c)	2	0
	MF	(Scotland) SCO	Ian Taylor	2	0
	MF	(Scotland) SCO	Alex Willoughby	2	0
	MF	(Scotland) SCO	Bertie Miller	2	0
	MF	(Scotland) SCO	George Buchan	1	2
	FW	(Scotland) SCO	Joe Harper	2	1
	FW	(Scotland) SCO	Dave Robb	2	0
	FW	(Scotland) SCO	Drew Jarvie	2	0
