= Chic McLelland =

Scottish footballer and manager (1953–2020)

Personal information
- Full name: Charles McLelland
- Date of birth: 24 March 1953
- Place of birth: Glasgow, Scotland
- Date of death: 26 December 2020 (aged 67)
- Position: Defender

Youth career
- Eastercraigs

Senior career*
Years	Team	Apps	(Gls)
1973–1979	Aberdeen	154	(3)
1979–1981	Motherwell	51	(1)
1981–1983	Dundee	16	(0)
1983–1990	Montrose	176	(0)
Total		397	(4)

International career
1976	Scotland U23	2	(0)

Managerial career
- 1990–1991: Montrose
- * Club domestic league appearances and goals

Charles McLelland (24 March 1953 – 26 December 2020) was a Scottish football player and manager. He played for Aberdeen, Motherwell, Dundee and Montrose. After retiring as a player, he joined the Montrose coaching staff and briefly served as co-manager of the team.

== Career statistics ==
=== Club ===
Appearances and goals by club, season and competition
Club	Season	League			Scottish Cup		League Cup		Europe		Total	
Club	Season	Division	Apps	Goals	Apps	Goals	Apps	Goals	Apps	Goals	Apps	Goals
Aberdeen	1970–71	Scottish Division One	0	0	0	0	0	0	0	0	0	0
Aberdeen	1971–72	Scottish Division One	0	0	0	0	0	0	0	0	0	0
Aberdeen	1972–73	Scottish Division One	0	0	0	0	0	0	0	0	0	0
Aberdeen	1973–74	Scottish Division One	15	1	0	0	0	0	0	0	15	1
Aberdeen	1974–75	Scottish Division One	33	1	4	0	6	0	0	0	43	1
Aberdeen	1975–76	Scottish Premier Division	30	0	2	0	6	0	0	0	38	0
Aberdeen	1976–77	Scottish Premier Division	25	1	3	0	9	0	0	0	37	1
Aberdeen	1977–78	Scottish Premier Division	25	0	5	0	6	0	2	0	38	0
Aberdeen	1978–79	Scottish Premier Division	26	0	3	0	8	1	4	1	41	2
Aberdeen	1979–80	Scottish Premier Division	0	0	0	0	0	0	0	0	0	0
Aberdeen	Total		154	3	17	0	35	1	6	1	212	5
Motherwell	1979–80	Scottish First Division	–	–	–	–	–	–	–	–	–	–
Motherwell	1980–81	Scottish First Division	–	–	–	–	–	–	–	–	–	–
Motherwell	Total		51	1	1	0	5	0	-	-	57	1
Dundee	1981–82	Scottish Premier Division	15	0	3	0	1	0	0	0	19	0
Dundee	1982–83	Scottish Premier Division	1	0	0	0	5	0	0	0	6	0
Dundee	Total		16	0	3	0	6	0	0	0	25	0
Career total			221+	4+	21+	0+	46+	1+	6+	1+	294+	6+

== Managerial record ==
Team	From	To	Record				
Team	From	To	P	W	L	D	Win %
Montrose	1990	1991	74	26	31	17	35.14%
