= 1971–72 Aberdeen F.C. season =

Aberdeen F.C.
1971–72 season
- Chairman: Dick Donald
- Manager: Jimmy Bonthrone
- Scottish First Division: 2nd
- Scottish Cup: Quarter-finalists
- Scottish League Cup: Group Stage
- UEFA Cup: Second Round
- Drybrough Cup: Winners
- Top goalscorer: League: Joe Harper (33); All: Joe Harper (45)
- Highest home attendance: 33,608 vs. Rangers, 15 January 1972
- Lowest home attendance: 8,240 vs. Ayr United, 8 April 1972
- Average home league attendance: 17,068
Home colours

== Results ==
=== Scottish First Division ===
Match Day	Date	Opponent	H/A	Score	Aberdeen Scorer(s)	Attendance
1.	4 September	Dundee	H	3–0	Willoughby, Robb, Harper	13,188
2.	11 September	St Johnstone	A	1–1	Robb	7,930
3.	18 September	Airdieonians	H	5–0	Harper (2), Robb (2), Graham	14,133
4.	25 September	Rangers	A	2–0	S. Murray, Harper	41,236
5.	2 October	Dunfermline Athletic	H	2–0	Harper, S. Murray	14,855
6.	9 October	Kilmarnock	A	3–0	Harper, S. Murray, Forrest	8,500
7.	16 October	Hibernian	H	2–1	Harper, Young	24,450
8.	23 October	Morton	A	1–0	S. Murray	4,843
9.	30 October	Partick Thistle	H	7–2	Harper (3), Willoughby (2), Forrest, Robb	19,304
10.	6 November	Celtic	A	1–1	McNeill	61,385
11.	13 November	East Fife	H	5–0	Young, Robb, Harper, Taylor, Hermiston	14,298
12.	20 November	Motherwell	A	4–0	S. Murray (2), Forrest, Harper	5,000
13.	27 November	Hearts	H	2–3	Harper, Robb	19,754
14.	4 December	Ayr United	A	5–1	Harper (2), Miller, Robb, S. Murray	7,582
15.	11 December	Clyde	H	4–1	Willoughby, Harper, G. Murray, M. Buchan	12,194
16.	18 December	Dundee United	H	3–0	S. Murray, Willoughby, Harper	13,707
17.	25 December	Falkirk	A	3–0	Harper (2), Miller	6,885
18.	1 January	Dundee	A	1–1	Harper	18,600
19.	3 January	St Johnstone	H	4–2	Graham (2), Harper, S. Murray	24,235
20.	8 January	Airdrieonians	A	2–1	Willoughby, Robb	5,681
21.	15 January	Rangers	H	0–0		33,608
22.	22 January	Dunfermline Athletic	A	0–1		7,243
23.	29 January	Kilmarnock	H	4–2	Harper (2), Graham, S. Murray	12,981
24.	12 February	Hibernian	A	2–2	Harper (2)	21,329
25.	19 February	Morton	H	1–0	Willoughby	14,230
26.	4 March	Partick Thistle	A	0–1		11,340
27.	11 March	Celtic	H	1–1	Harper	32,853
28.	21 March	East Fife	A	2–0	Harper	4,850
29.	25 March	Motherwell	H	4–1	Harper (2), Forrest, Robb	9,351
30.	1 April	Hearts	A	0–1		7,139
31.	8 April	Ayr United	H	7–0	Harper (4), Miller, Taylor, Young	8,240
32.	15 April	Clyde	A	0–0		1,535
33.	22 April	Dundee United	A	0–2	Hermiston, Taylor	4,743
34.	29 April	Falkirk	H	0–0		8,771

==== Final standings ====
Pos	Team	Pld	W	D	L	GF	GA	GD	Pts	Qualification or relegation
1	Celtic	34	28	4	2	96	28	+68	60	Champion
2	Aberdeen	34	21	8	5	80	26	+54	50	
3	Rangers	34	21	2	11	71	38	+33	44	
4	Hibernian	34	19	6	9	62	34	+28	44	
5	Dundee	34	14	13	7	59	38	+21	41	

Source: Soccerbase and League Tables

=== Drybrough Cup ===
Round	Date	Opponent	H/A	Score	Aberdeen Scorer(s)	Attendance
QF	31 July	East Fife	A	3–0	Buchan, Harper, Graham	
SF	4 August	Airdrieonians	A	4–1	Buchan, Harper, Robb, Delaney	
F	7 August	Celtic	H	2–1	Robb, Harper	25,000

=== Scottish League Cup ===
==== Group stage ====
Round	Date	Opponent	H/A	Score	Aberdeen Scorer(s)	Attendance
G2	14 August	Dundee	H	1–1	Robb	19,053
G2	18 August	Clyde	A	2–0	Harper (2)	2,027
G2	21 August	Falkirk	H	1–0	Harper	17,339
G2	25 August	Clyde	H	5–0	Graham (3), Harper, Willoughby	15,542
G2	28 August	Dundee	A	1–3	Willoughby	11,875
G2	1 September	Falkirk	A	1–3	Forrest	11,865

==== Group 2 final table ====
Team	Pld	W	D	L	GF	GA	GD	Pts
Falkirk	6	4	1	1	12	6	+6	9
Dundee	6	3	2	1	10	5	+5	8
Aberdeen	6	3	1	2	11	7	+4	7
Clyde	6	0	0	6	2	17	−15	0

=== Scottish Cup ===
Round	Date	Opponent	H/A	Score	Aberdeen Scorer(s)	Attendance
R3	5 February	Dundee United	A	4–0	Harper (2), Miller, Young	12,974
R4	26 February	Morton	H	1–0	Willoughby	18,277
QF	18 March	Hibernian	A	0–2		25,936

=== UEFA Cup ===
Round	Date	Opponent	H/A	Score	Aberdeen Scorer(s)	Attendance
R1 L1	15 September	(Spain) Celta Vigo	A	2–0	Harper, Forrest	35,000
R1 L2	29 September	(Spain) Celta Vigo	H	1–0	Harper	20,000
R2 L1	27 October	(Italy) Juventus	A	0–2		35,000
R2 L2	17 November	(Italy) Juventus	H	1–1	Harper	29,000

== Squad ==
=== Appearances & Goals ===
No.	Pos	Nat	Player	Total		Division One		Scottish Cup		League Cup		UEFA Cup	
No.	Pos	Nat	Player	Apps	Goals	Apps	Goals	Apps	Goals	Apps	Goals	Apps	Goals
	GK	(Scotland) SCO	Bobby Clark	32	0	22	0	1	0	6	0	3	0
	GK	(England) ENG	Gordon Marshall	9	0	7	0	2	0	0	0	0	0
	GK	(Scotland) SCO	Andy Geoghegan	6	0	5	0	0	0	0	0	1	0
	GK	??	Gordon Paterson	0	0	0	0	0	0	0	0	0	0
	DF	(Scotland) SCO	Jim Hermiston	43	1	33	1	3	0	4	0	3	0
	DF	(Scotland) SCO	Martin Buchan (c)	37	1	25	1	2	0	6	0	4	0
	DF	(Scotland) SCO	Willie Young	34	4	26	3	3	1	1	0	4	0
	DF	(Denmark) DEN	Henning Boel	22	0	14	0	1	0	5	0	2	0
	DF	(Scotland) SCO	Tommy McMillan	13	0	8	0	0	0	5	0	0	0
	DF	(Scotland) SCO	Billy Williamson	3	0	0	0	0	0	3	0	0	0
	DF	(Scotland) SCO	Ian Hair	0	0	0	0	0	0	0	0	0	0
	DF	(Scotland) SCO	Chic McLelland	0	0	0	0	0	0	0	0	0	0
	MF	(Scotland) SCO	Steve Murray (c)	45	10	32	10	3	0	6	0	4	0
	MF	(Scotland) SCO	Alex Willoughby	42	10	29	7	3	1	6	2	4	0
	MF	(Scotland) SCO	Arthur Graham	41	7	29	4	3	0	6	3	3	0
	MF	(Scotland) SCO	George Murray	33	1	23	1	3	0	3	0	4	0
	MF	(Scotland) SCO	Bertie Miller	25	4	23	3	2	1	0	0	0	0
	MF	(Scotland) SCO	Ian Taylor	18	2	15	2	1	0	0	0	2	0
	MF	(Scotland) SCO	George Buchan	7	0	1	0	0	0	3	0	3	0
	MF	(Scotland) SCO	Ian Purdie	1	0	1	0	0	0	0	0	0	0
	MF	(Scotland) SCO	Jimmy Miller	0	0	0	0	0	0	0	0	0	0
	FW	(Scotland) SCO	Joe Harper	47	42	34	33	3	2	6	4	4	3
	FW	(Scotland) SCO	Dave Robb	46	11	34	10	2	0	6	1	4	0
	FW	(Scotland) SCO	Jim Forrest	31	6	22	4	2	0	3	1	4	1
	FW	(Scotland) SCO	Tommy Wilson	8	0	7	0	1	0	0	0	0	0
	FW	(Scotland) SCO	John Craig	0	0	0	0	0	0	0	0	0	0

=== Unofficial Appearances & Goals ===
No.	Pos	Nat	Player	Drybrough Cup	
No.	Pos	Nat	Player	Apps	Goals
	GK	(Scotland) SCO	Bobby Clark	3	0
	DF	(Denmark) DEN	Henning Boel	3	0
	DF	(Scotland) SCO	Martin Buchan (c)	3	0
	DF	(Scotland) SCO	Jim Hermiston	3	0
	DF	(Scotland) SCO	Willie Young	3	0
	MF	(Scotland) SCO	Steve Murray	3	0
	MF	(Scotland) SCO	George Buchan	3	2
	MF	(Scotland) SCO	Alex Willoughby	3	1
	MF	(Scotland) SCO	Arthur Graham	3	1
	FW	(Scotland) SCO	Dave Robb	3	2
	FW	(Scotland) SCO	Joe Harper	3	2
	FW	(Scotland) SCO	Jim Forrest	1	0
