= Joe Smith (footballer, born 1953) =

Scottish footballer

Personal information
- Full name: Joseph Smith
- Date of birth: 11 November 1953 (age 72)
- Place of birth: Glasgow, Scotland
- Position: Midfielder

Youth career
- St. Gregory's B.C.

Senior career*
Years	Team	Apps	(Gls)
1972–1978	Aberdeen	142	(7)
1978–1979	→Arbroath (loan)	4	(0)
1978–1981	Motherwell	57	(0)
1981–1982	Peterhead		
1982–1984	Dunfermline Athletic	18	(0)
Total		221+	(7+)

International career
1976	Scotland U23	1	(0)
- * Club domestic league appearances and goals

Joe Smith (born 11 November 1953 in Glasgow) is a Scottish former footballer, who played for Aberdeen, Arbroath, Motherwell, Peterhead and Dunfermline.

== Career statistics ==
=== Club ===
Appearances and goals by club, season and competition
Club	Season	League			Scottish Cup		League Cup		Europe		Total	
Club	Season	Division	Apps	Goals	Apps	Goals	Apps	Goals	Apps	Goals	Apps	Goals
Aberdeen	1970–71	Scottish Division One	0	0	0	0	0	0	0	0	0	0
Aberdeen	1971–72	Scottish Division One	0	0	0	0	0	0	0	0	0	0
Aberdeen	1972–73	Scottish Division One	14	0	3	0	0	0	0	0	17	0
Aberdeen	1973–74	Scottish Division One	25	1	1	0	8	1	3	0	37	2
Aberdeen	1974–75	Scottish Division One	26	1	3	0	6	0	0	0	35	1
Aberdeen	1975–76	Scottish Premier Division	33	2	2	1	6	0	0	0	41	3
Aberdeen	1976–77	Scottish Premier Division	35	3	3	0	11	1	0	0	49	4
Aberdeen	1977–78	Scottish Premier Division	7	0	0	0	3	1	0	0	10	1
Aberdeen	1978–79	Scottish Premier Division	2	0	0	0	0	0	0	0	2	0
Aberdeen	Total		142	7	12	1	34	3	3	0	191	11
Arbroath (loan)	1978-79	Scottish First Division	4	0	0	0	0	0	-	-	4	0
Motherwell	1978-79	Scottish Premier Division	-	-	-	-	-	-	-	-	-	-
Motherwell	1979-80	Scottish First Division	-	-	-	-	-	-	-	-	-	-
Motherwell	1980-81	Scottish First Division	-	-	-	-	-	-	-	-	-	-
Motherwell	Total		57	0	3	0	3	0	-	-	63	0
Dunfermline Athletic	1982-83	Scottish First Division	17	0	2	0	0	0	-	-	19	0
Dunfermline Athletic	1983-84	Scottish Second Division	1	0	0	0	1	0	-	-	2	0
Dunfermline Athletic	Total		18	0	2	0	1	0	-	-	21	0
Career total			221	7	17	1	38	3	3	0	279	11
