= Duncan Davidson (footballer) =

Scottish footballer (born 1954)

Personal information
- Full name: Duncan Davidson
- Date of birth: 5 July 1954 (age 72)
- Place of birth: Elgin, Scotland
- Position: Forward

Youth career
- Lewis United

Senior career*
Years	Team	Apps	(Gls)
1973–1981	Aberdeen	78	(18)
1981	Tulsa Roughnecks	9	(2)
1981–1982	Toronto Blizzard	21	(4)
1983	See Bee (Hong Kong)		
1983–1984	Manchester City	6	(1)
1984–????	Cove Rangers		
- * Club domestic league appearances and goals

Duncan Davidson (born 5 July 1954) is a Scottish former footballer.

== Playing career ==
Duncan Davidson was born in Elgin, Moray in 1954. He signed for Aberdeen in 1973 from Lewis United. In 1981, he moved to the USA where he played for Tulsa Roughnecks and Toronto Blizzard. In 1983, he joined Hong Kong club See Bee, where he remained for a year before returning to the UK to join English club Manchester City. He retired from the game in 1984 to become a financial advisor.

== Career statistics ==
Appearances and goals by club, season and competition
Club	Season	League			National Cup		League Cup		Europe		Total	
Club	Season	Division	Apps	Goals	Apps	Goals	Apps	Goals	Apps	Goals	Apps	Goals
Aberdeen	1973–74	Scottish Division One	5	0	0	0	0	0	0	0	5	0
Aberdeen	1974–75	Scottish Division One	16	2	3	1	3	0	0	0	22	3
Aberdeen	1975–76	Scottish Premier Division	0	0	0	0	0	0	0	0	0	0
Aberdeen	1976–77	Scottish Premier Division	13	5	2	1	0	0	0	0	15	6
Aberdeen	1977–78	Scottish Premier Division	24	8	6	2	6	2	2	0	38	12
Aberdeen	1978–79	Scottish Premier Division	9	2	2	1	2	1	0	0	13	4
Aberdeen	1979–80	Scottish Premier Division	7	1	2	0	3	1	1	0	13	2
Aberdeen	1980–81	Scottish Premier Division	4	0	1	0	1	0	0	0	6	0
Aberdeen	Total		78	18	16	5	15	4	3	0	112	27
Tusla Roughnecks	1981	North American Soccer League	9	2	0	0	0	0	0	0	9	2
Toronto Blizzard	1981	North American Soccer League	12	2	0	0	0	0	0	0	12	2
Toronto Blizzard	1982	North American Soccer League	9	2	0	0	0	0	0	0	9	2
Toronto Blizzard	Total		21	4	0	0	0	0	0	0	21	4
Toronto Blizzard (indoor)	1981–82	NASL (Indoor)	13	9	0	0	0	0	0	0	13	9
Manchester City	1983-84	Second Division	6	1	0	0	1	0	-	-	7	1
Career total			127	34	16	5	16	4	3	0	162	43
