= Teddy Scott =

Scottish footballer and coach (1929–2012)

Harry Edward Scott (22 March 1929 – 21 June 2012) was a Scottish footballer and coach, who served Aberdeen in a number of capacities between joining the club in 1954 and his retirement in 2003.

Although he only ever made one first-team appearance for the club, Scott is a founder member of the Aberdeen Hall of Fame thanks to his more than five decades of work behind the scenes at Pittodrie.

== Personal life ==
Scott was born on 22 March 1929, and lived in Ellon. He died on 21 June 2012, at the age of 83.

== Career ==
Scott played for Bournemouth & Boscombe Athletic during his National service at the end of World War II, and returned to Aberdeen upon being demobbed. He played junior football for Sunnybank in Aberdeen, with whom he won the Scottish Junior Cup at Hampden Park in 1954. He was signed by Aberdeen manager Dave Halliday following that victory. Scott faced strong competition for a place in the senior side, and only played one first-team game for Aberdeen. In a search for first-team football, Scott then played for Brechin City and Elgin City, but returned to Aberdeen to work as trainer, or coach.

Scott's coaching duties were mainly with the youth and reserve sides, and he was regarded by many of the young players who later became first-team regulars, and in some cases, household names, as a mentor or father figure. Scott himself explained his philosophy of the game:

You try to teach the youngsters good habits as well as skills and hope they will still be around when the club can reap the benefit.

Scott's duties at Pittodrie were many and varied; the club's official history recounts the tale of arriving for an away European match under the management of Sir Alex Ferguson; when it was discovered that the wrong shorts had been brought, Ferguson threatened to sack Scott, only for Gordon Strachan, one of Aberdeen's players, to ask:

And where are you going to get the ten people to replace him?

Scott was held in sufficient high regard by the club that he was awarded a testimonial match - an honour normally reserved for long-serving players - in January 1999. Alex Ferguson sent along a full strength Manchester United side. In 2013, the Europa Lounge at Pittodrie Stadium was renamed the Teddy Scott Lounge and redecorated to commemorate his contributions to the club.

Aberdeen's iconic captain Willie Miller also credited Scott, who was then reserve team coach, as having advised him to switch positions from forward to defender, to great effect.

He was posthumously awarded a winners medal for the UEFA Cup Winners Cup triumph from 1983.
