= Willie Young (footballer, born 1951) =

Scottish footballer (1951–2025)

Personal information
- Full name: William David Young
- Date of birth: 25 November 1951
- Place of birth: Edinburgh, Scotland
- Date of death: 31 October 2025 (aged 73)
- Height: 6 ft 3 in (1.91 m)
- Position: Central defender

Youth career
- Seton Athletic

Senior career*
Years	Team	Apps	(Gls)
1969–1975	Aberdeen	133	(10)
1975–1977	Tottenham Hotspur	54	(3)
1977–1981	Arsenal	170	(11)
1981–1983	Nottingham Forest	59	(5)
1983	Norwich City	6	(0)
1983–1984	Brighton & Hove Albion	4	(0)
1984	Darlington	4	(0)
Total		430	(29)

International career
1972–1975	Scotland U23	5	(1)
- * Club domestic league appearances and goals

William David Young (25 November 1951 – 31 October 2025) was a Scottish footballer. Playing as a centre-back, he featured for Aberdeen, Tottenham Hotspur, Arsenal, Nottingham Forest, Norwich City, Brighton & Hove Albion and Darlington.

== Club career ==
From Heriot near Edinburgh, Young attended Ross High School in Tranent. Nicknamed "Big Willie", he first played professionally for Aberdeen, making 187 appearances for the Dons between 1970 and 1975. He was signed by Tottenham Hotspur in September 1975, and while playing under Terry Neill made 64 appearances for Spurs in two seasons. In March 1977, Young once again signed for manager Neill so as to link up at Highbury with Spurs' arch-rivals Arsenal.

Young immediately became a regular in the Arsenal first team, and played in all of the 'Gunners'' trio of FA Cup finals; after losing to Ipswich Town in 1978, he was on the winning side the following year, with a 3–2 defeat of Manchester United. Young was a runner up in the 1980 FA Cup final, where he made an infamous tackle on West Ham United's Paul Allen, and also a runner up in the 1980 European Cup Winners' Cup Final.

Young continued to be Arsenal's first choice centre back until the 1981–82 season, when he lost his place to Chris Whyte. Having played 237 times and scoring 19 goals for Arsenal, the 30-year-old Young then joined Nottingham Forest in December 1981 for £50,000, and played 59 times over two seasons there.

In 1983, he joined Norwich City, but with injuries dogging him, he failed to secure a regular place in the side. He then had short spells at Brighton and Hove Albion followed by Darlington before retiring from the game in 1984.

== International career ==
Young was capped five times, scoring one goal for the Scotland under-23 national team. He never played a full international for Scotland having been banned for life after an incident in a Copenhagen nightclub in 1975.

== Personal life and death ==
As a player at Aberdeen, Young worked on oil rigs during the summer to top up his earnings. He was married to Lynda; they had three children. After retiring from football he spent 19 years running a pub called Bramcote Manor near Nottingham, and then bought kennels in Bottesford, Leicestershire.

Young died on 31 October 2025, at the age of 73.

== Career statistics ==
=== Club ===
Appearances and goals by club, season and competition
Club	Season	League			National cup		League cup		Europe		Other		Total	
Club	Season	Division	Apps	Goals	Apps	Goals	Apps	Goals	Apps	Goals	Apps	Goals	Apps	Goals
Aberdeen	1970–71	Scottish Division One	9	0	0	0	0	0	1	0	–		10	0
Aberdeen	1971–72	Scottish Division One	26	3	3	1	1	0	4	0	–		34	4
Aberdeen	1972–73	Scottish Division One	30	2	4	0	11	2	2	0	–		47	4
Aberdeen	1973–74	Scottish Division One	34	2	1	0	10	0	4	0	–		49	2
Aberdeen	1974–75	Scottish Division One	31	3	4	0	4	1	0	0	–		39	4
Aberdeen	1975–76	Scottish Premier Division	3	0	0	0	6	0	0	0	–		9	0
Aberdeen	Total		133	10	12	1	32	3	11	0	0	0	188	14
Tottenham Hotspur	1975–76	First Division	35	2	2	0	6	1	0	0	–		43	3
Tottenham Hotspur	1976–77	First Division	19	1	0	0	2	0	0	0	–		21	1
Tottenham Hotspur	Total		54	3	2	0	8	1	0	0	0	0	64	4
Arsenal	1976–77	First Division	14	1	0	0	0	0	0	0	–		14	1
Arsenal	1977–78	First Division	35	3	6	1	7	0	0	0	–		48	4
Arsenal	1978–79	First Division	33	0	10	2	1	0	6	1	–		50	3
Arsenal	1979–80	First Division	38	3	11	0	6	0	9	3	1	0	65	6
Arsenal	1980–81	First Division	40	4	1	0	4	0	0	0	–		45	4
Arsenal	1981–82	First Division	10	0	0	0	2	1	3	0	–		15	1
Arsenal	Total		170	11	28	3	20	1	18	4	1	0	237	19
Nottingham Forest	1981–82	First Division	25	1	0	0	0	0	0	0	–		25	1
Nottingham Forest	1982–83	First Division	34	4	0	0	0	0	0	0	–		34	4
Nottingham Forest	Total		59	5	0	0	0	0	0	0	0	0	59	5
Norwich City	1983–84	First Division	6	0	0	0	0	0	0	0	–		6	0
Brighton & Hove Albion	1983–84	Second Division	4	0	0	0	0	0	0	0	–		4	0
Darlington	1984–85	Fourth Division	4	0	0	0	0	0	0	0	–		4	0
Career total			430	29	42	4	60	5	29	4	1	0	562	42

== Honours ==
Arsenal

- FA Cup: 1978–79; runner-up: 1977–78, 1979–80
- European Cup Winners' Cup runner-up: 1979–80
