= Ian Hair =

Scottish footballer

Personal information
- Date of birth: 8 August 1954 (age 72)
- Place of birth: Glasgow, Scotland
- Position: Midfielder

Youth career
- East Kilbride Boys Club
- 1971–1973: Aberdeen

Senior career*
Years	Team	Apps	(Gls)
1973–1976	Aberdeen	76	(5)
1976–1981	Montrose	123	(6)
Total		199	(11)
- * Club domestic league appearances and goals

Ian Hair (born 1954) is a Scottish former professional footballer, who played for Aberdeen and Montrose.

Hair signed for Aberdeen in 1971 and played for them until 1976. He played mostly in defence or midfield, making a total of 99 appearances whilst scoring 6 goals.

Hair then went on to play for Montrose in which he held the highest paid signing for the club.

== Career statistics ==
Club	Season	League			National Cup		League Cup		Europe		Total	
Club	Season	Division	Apps	Goals	Apps	Goals	Apps	Goals	Apps	Goals	Apps	Goals
Aberdeen	1973-74	Scottish Division One	18	1	0	0	4	0	4	0	26	1
Aberdeen	1974-75	Scottish Division One	27	4	4	0	4	0	0	0	35	4
Aberdeen	1975-76	Scottish Premier Division	30	0	1	0	6	1	0	0	37	1
Aberdeen	1976-77	Scottish Premier Division	1	0	0	0	0	0	0	0	1	0
Aberdeen	Total		76	5	5	0	14	1	4	0	99	6
