= 1979–80 Leeds United A.F.C. season =

Leeds United
1979–80 season
- Chairman: Manny Cussins
- Manager: Jimmy Adamson
- Stadium: Elland Road
- First Division: 11th
- FA Cup: Third round
- Football League Cup: Second round
- UEFA Cup: Second round
- Highest home attendance: 39,779 vs Liverpool, First Division, 15 September 1979
- Lowest home attendance: 14,967 vs Coventry City, First Division, 22 March 1980
- Average home league attendance: 22,897

The 1979–80 season was Leeds United's sixteenth consecutive season in the Football League First Division.

Manager Jimmy Adamson had joined the club in October 1978 after the departure of manager Jock Stein and hence it was his first full season at the club.

It was a disappointing campaign for the club as they recorded the worst league finish since promotion to the First Division in 1964, finishing 11th with 40 points.

== Competitions ==
=== Football League First Division ===
==== League table ====
Pos	Team	Pld	W	D	L	GF	GA	GD	Pts
9	Middlesbrough	42	16	12	14	50	44	+6	44
10	West Bromwich Albion	42	11	19	12	54	50	+4	41
11	Leeds United	42	13	14	15	46	50	−4	40
12	Norwich City	42	13	14	15	58	66	−8	40
13	Crystal Palace	42	12	16	14	41	50	−9	40

Source: World Football
Rules for classification: 1) Points; 2) Goal difference; 3) Goals scored

==== Matches ====
Win	Draw	Loss

First Division match results
Date	Opponent	Venue	Result F–A	Scorers	Attendance
18 August 1979	Bristol City	A	2–2	Curtis (2)	22,845
22 August 1979	Everton	H	2–0	Hird, Harris	30,000
25 August 1979	Norwich City	A	1–2	Hart	18,444
1 September 1979	Arsenal	H	1–1	Hart	23,245
8 September 1979	Nottingham Forest	A	0–0		26,914
15 September 1979	Liverpool	H	1–1	Curtis	39,779
22 September 1979	Bolton Wanderers	A	1–1	Gray (pen)	21,724
29 September 1979	Manchester City	H	1–2	Hankin	29,592
6 October 1979	Ipswich Town	H	2–1	Cherry, Hird (pen)	19,342
13 October 1979	Brighton & Hove Albion	A	0–0		27,002
20 October 1979	Tottenham Hotspur	H	1–2	Hankin	25,203
27 October 1979	Southampton	A	2–1	Entwistle, Curtis	23,259
3 November 1979	Bristol City	H	1–3	Gray	17,376
10 November 1979	Coventry City	A	0–3		19,402
13 November 1979	Everton	A	1–5	Hird	23,000
17 November 1979	West Bromwich Albion	H	1–0	Connor	17,481
24 November 1979	Aston Villa	A	0–0		29,736
1 December 1979	Crystal Palace	H	1–0	Hird	21,330
8 December 1979	Manchester United	A	1–1	Connor	57,478
15 December 1979	Wolverhampton Wanderers	H	3–0	Connor, Graham, Hamson	21,227
21 December 1979	Stoke City	A	2–0	Connor, Harris	16,878
26 December 1979	Middlesbrough	A	1–3	Entwistle	26,655
29 December 1979	Norwich City	H	2–2	Hird, Hankin	23,493
1 January 1980	Derby County	H	1–0	Hird	24,271
12 January 1980	Arsenal	A	1–0	Connor	32,799
19 January 1980	Nottingham Forest	H	1–2	Connor	29,816
9 February 1980	Bolton Wanderers	H	2–2	Hird (pen), Graham	16,428
16 February 1980	Manchester City	A	1–1	Graham	34,392
23 February 1980	Brighton & Hove Albion	H	1–1	Flynn	17,216
1 March 1980	Tottenham Hotspur	A	1–2	Chandler	35,331
8 March 1980	Southampton	H	2–0	Hart, Parlane	21,169
14 March 1980	Ipswich Town	A	0–1		23,140
19 March 1980	Liverpool	A	0–3		37,008
22 March 1980	Coventry City	H	0–0		14,967
29 March 1980	West Bromwich Albion	A	1–2	Chandler	18,898
2 April 1980	Middlesbrough	H	2–0	Cherry, Flynn	17,906
5 April 1980	Derby County	A	0–2		22,745
8 April 1980	Stoke City	H	3–0	Parlane, Harris (2)	15,541
12 April 1980	Crystal Palace	A	0–1		25,318
19 April 1980	Aston Villa	H	0–0		15,840
26 April 1980	Wolverhampton Wanderers	A	1–3	Flynn	22,746
3 May 1980	Manchester United	H	2–0	Parlane, Hird (pen)	39,625

=== FA Cup ===
Win	Draw	Loss

FA Cup match details
Round	Date	Opponent	Venue	Result F–A	Scorers	Attendance
Third round	5 January 1980	Nottingham Forest	A	1–4	Lloyd (o.g.)	35,945

=== League Cup ===
Win	Draw	Loss

League Cup match details
Round	Date	Opponent	Venue	Result F–A	Scorers	Attendance
Second round (first leg)	29 August 1979	Arsenal	H	1–1	Stevenson (pen.)	23,421
Second round (second leg)	4 September 1979	Arsenal	A	0–7		35,129

=== UEFA Cup ===
Win	Draw	Loss

UEFA Cup match details
Round	Date	Opponent	Venue	Result F–A	Scorers	Attendance
First round (first leg)	19 September 1979	Valletta	A	4–0	Graham (3), Hart	18,735
First round (second leg)	3 October 1979	Valletta	H	3–0	Curtis, Hankin, Hart	13,682
Second round (first leg)	24 October 1979	Universitatea Craiova	A	0–2		35,000
Second round (second leg)	7 November 1979	Universitatea Craiova	H	0–2		14,438

== Bibliography ==
- Jarred, Martin; MacDonald, Malcolm (1986). Leeds United: a complete record 1919–1986. Derby: Breedon Books Sport. ISBN 0-907969-17-8. OCLC 14977257.
