= 1976–77 Scottish League Cup =

Tournament details
- Country: Scotland

Final positions
- Champions: Aberdeen
- Runners-up: Celtic

The 1976–77 Scottish League Cup was the thirty-first season of Scotland's second football knockout competition. The competition was won by Aberdeen, who defeated Celtic in the Final.

== First round ==
=== Group 1 ===
Team	Pld	W	D	L	GF	GA	GD	Pts
Heart of Midlothian	6	4	1	1	15	8	+7	9
Dundee	6	3	1	2	9	10	−1	7
Partick Thistle	6	2	2	2	8	7	+1	6
Motherwell	6	0	2	4	7	14	−7	2

Home team	Score	Away team	Date
Heart of Midlothian	2–0	Dundee	14 August 1976
Motherwell	1–1	Partick Thistle	14 August 1976
Dundee	2–1	Motherwell	18 August 1976
Partick Thistle	0–2	Heart of Midlothian	18 August 1976
Dundee	0–2	Partick Thistle	21 August 1976
Heart of Midlothian	2–1	Motherwell	21 August 1976
Heart of Midlothian	3–3	Partick Thistle	25 August 1976
Motherwell	3–3	Dundee	25 August 1976
Motherwell	1–4	Heart of Midlothian	28 August 1976
Partick Thistle	0–1	Dundee	28 August 1976
Dundee	3–2	Heart of Midlothian	1 September 1976
Partick Thistle	2–0	Motherwell	1 September 1976

=== Group 2 ===
Team	Pld	W	D	L	GF	GA	GD	Pts
Aberdeen	6	4	1	1	12	5	+7	9
Ayr United	6	2	2	2	8	8	0	6
Kilmarnock	6	2	1	3	6	8	−2	5
St Mirren	6	1	2	3	7	12	−5	4

Home team	Score	Away team	Date
Aberdeen	2–0	Kilmarnock	14 August 1976
Ayr United	2–1	St Mirren	14 August 1976
Kilmarnock	2–0	Ayr United	18 August 1976
St Mirren	2–3	Aberdeen	18 August 1976
Aberdeen	1–0	Ayr United	21 August 1976
Kilmarnock	1–1	St Mirren	21 August 1976
Aberdeen	4–0	St Mirren	25 August 1976
Ayr United	3–1	Kilmarnock	25 August 1976
Ayr United	1–1	Aberdeen	28 August 1976
St Mirren	1–0	Kilmarnock	28 August 1976
Kilmarnock	2–1	Aberdeen	1 September 1976
St Mirren	2–2	Ayr United	1 September 1976

=== Group 3 ===
Team	Pld	W	D	L	GF	GA	GD	Pts
Celtic	6	4	2	0	15	5	+10	10
Dundee United	6	3	2	1	9	5	+4	8
Dumbarton	6	2	2	2	10	9	+1	6
Arbroath	6	0	0	6	2	17	−15	0

Home team	Score	Away team	Date
Dumbarton	2–0	Arbroath	14 August 1976
Dundee United	0–1	Celtic	14 August 1976
Arbroath	1–3	Dundee United	18 August 1976
Celtic	3–0	Dumbarton	18 August 1976
Arbroath	0–5	Celtic	21 August 1976
Dumbarton	1–2	Dundee United	21 August 1976
Dumbarton	3–3	Celtic	25 August 1976
Dundee United	2–0	Arbroath	25 August 1976
Celtic	2–1	Arbroath	28 August 1976
Dundee United	1–1	Dumbarton	28 August 1976
Arbroath	0–3	Dumbarton	1 September 1976
Celtic	1–1	Dundee United	1 September 1976

=== Group 4 ===
Team	Pld	W	D	L	GF	GA	GD	Pts
Rangers	6	5	1	0	17	1	+16	11
Hibernian	6	3	2	1	13	7	+6	8
Montrose	6	1	2	3	5	9	−4	4
St Johnstone	6	0	1	5	4	22	−18	1

Home team	Score	Away team	Date
Montrose	0–1	Hibernian	14 August 1976
Rangers	5–0	St Johnstone	14 August 1976
Hibernian	1–1	Rangers	18 August 1976
St Johnstone	0–0	Montrose	18 August 1976
Rangers	4–0	Montrose	21 August 1976
St Johnstone	1–2	Hibernian	21 August 1976
Montrose	5–1	St Johnstone	25 August 1976
Rangers	3–0	Hibernian	25 August 1976
Hibernian	9–2	St Johnstone	28 August 1976
Montrose	0–3	Rangers	28 August 1976
Hibernian	0–0	Montrose	1 September 1976
St Johnstone	0–1	Rangers	1 September 1976

=== Group 5 ===
Team	Pld	W	D	L	GF	GA	GD	Pts
Airdrieonians	6	5	0	1	19	7	+12	10
Queen's Park	6	3	0	3	9	14	−5	6
Clyde	6	1	2	3	10	11	−1	4
Raith Rovers	6	1	2	3	8	14	−6	4

Home team	Score	Away team	Date
Airdrieonians	3–1	Queen's Park	14 August 1976
Clyde	1–1	Raith Rovers	14 August 1976
Queen's Park	3–5	Clyde	18 August 1976
Raith Rovers	1–4	Airdrieonians	18 August 1976
Clyde	2–3	Airdrieonians	21 August 1976
Raith Rovers	0–1	Queen's Park	21 August 1976
Airdrieonians	7–1	Raith Rovers	25 August 1976
Clyde	1–2	Queen's Park	25 August 1976
Airdrieonians	1–0	Clyde	28 August 1976
Queen's Park	0–4	Raith Rovers	28 August 1976
Queen's Park	2–1	Airdrieonians	1 September 1976
Raith Rovers	1–1	Clyde	1 September 1976

=== Group 6 ===
Team	Pld	W	D	L	GF	GA	GD	Pts
Falkirk	6	4	0	2	14	10	+4	8
Hamilton Academical	6	2	2	2	16	8	+8	6
Stranraer	6	2	1	3	15	17	−2	5
East Fife	6	2	1	3	7	17	−10	5

Home team	Score	Away team	Date
East Fife	3–0	Stranraer	14 August 1976
Falkirk	1–0	Hamilton Academical	14 August 1976
Hamilton Academical	5–0	East Fife	18 August 1976
Stranraer	5–0	Falkirk	18 August 1976
Falkirk	1–2	East Fife	21 August 1976
Hamilton Academical	6–1	Stranraer	21 August 1976
East Fife	1–1	Hamilton Academical	25 August 1976
Falkirk	5–1	Stranraer	25 August 1976
East Fife	1–5	Falkirk	28 August 1976
Stranraer	3–3	Hamilton Academical	28 August 1976
Hamilton Academical	1–2	Falkirk	1 September 1976
Stranraer	5–0	East Fife	1 September 1976

=== Group 7 ===
Team	Pld	W	D	L	GF	GA	GD	Pts
Stirling Albion	6	3	2	1	11	4	+7	8
Morton	6	2	3	1	12	6	+6	7
East Stirlingshire	6	1	3	2	8	11	−3	5
Cowdenbeath	6	1	2	3	3	13	−10	4

Home team	Score	Away team	Date
Cowdenbeath	2–1	East Stirlingshire	14 August 1976
Morton	1–0	Stirling Albion	14 August 1976
East Stirlingshire	1–1	Morton	18 August 1976
Stirling Albion	0–0	Cowdenbeath	18 August 1976
Morton	7–1	Cowdenbeath	21 August 1976
Stirling Albion	1–1	East Stirlingshire	21 August 1976
Cowdenbeath	0–1	Stirling Albion	25 August 1976
Morton	1–1	East Stirlingshire	25 August 1976
Cowdenbeath	0–0	Morton	28 August 1976
East Stirlingshire	0–6	Stirling Albion	28 August 1976
East Stirlingshire	4–0	Cowdenbeath	1 September 1976
Stirling Albion	3–2	Morton	1 September 1976

=== Group 8 ===
Team	Pld	W	D	L	GF	GA	GD	Pts
Clydebank	6	5	0	1	9	2	+7	10
Alloa Athletic	6	3	1	2	8	6	+2	7
Queen of the South	6	1	2	3	4	8	−4	4
Dunfermline Athletic	6	1	1	4	3	8	−5	3

Home team	Score	Away team	Date
Alloa Athletic	1–0	Clydebank	14 August 1976
Queen of the South	1–0	Dunfermline Athletic	14 August 1976
Clydebank	1–0	Queen of the South	18 August 1976
Dunfermline Athletic	3–0	Alloa Athletic	18 August 1976
Dunfermline Athletic	0–1	Clydebank	21 August 1976
Queen of the South	2–2	Alloa Athletic	21 August 1976
Alloa Athletic	4–0	Dunfermline Athletic	25 August 1976
Queen of the South	1–4	Clydebank	25 August 1976
Alloa Athletic	1–0	Queen of the South	28 August 1976
Clydebank	2–0	Dunfermline Athletic	28 August 1976
Clydebank	1–0	Alloa Athletic	1 September 1976
Dunfermline Athletic	0–0	Queen of the South	1 September 1976

=== Group 9 ===
Team	Pld	W	D	L	GF	GA	GD	Pts
Albion Rovers	5	3	2	0	7	2	+5	8
Brechin City	5	3	1	1	7	3	+4	7
Meadowbank Thistle	5	1	4	0	5	4	+1	6
Stenhousemuir	5	1	2	2	5	6	−1	4
Berwick Rangers	5	0	4	1	4	6	−2	4
Forfar Athletic	5	0	1	4	3	10	−7	1

Home team	Score	Away team	Date
Berwick Rangers	1–1	Albion Rovers	14 August 1976
Forfar Athletic	0–3	Stenhousemuir	14 August 1976
Meadowbank Thistle	0–0	Brechin City	14 August 1976
Albion Rovers	1–0	Forfar Athletic	18 August 1976
Brechin City	3–1	Berwick Rangers	18 August 1976
Stenhousemuir	1–1	Meadowbank Thistle	18 August 1976
Albion Rovers	0–0	Meadowbank Thistle	21 August 1976
Berwick Rangers	1–1	Forfar Athletic	21 August 1976
Brechin City	2–0	Stenhousemuir	21 August 1976
Forfar Athletic	0–2	Brechin City	25 August 1976
Meadowbank Thistle	1–1	Berwick Rangers	25 August 1976
Stenhousemuir	1–3	Albion Rovers	25 August 1976
Brechin City	0–2	Albion Rovers	28 August 1976
Forfar Athletic	2–3	Meadowbank Thistle	28 August 1976
Stenhousemuir	0–0	Berwick Rangers	28 August 1976

== Supplementary round ==
=== First leg ===
Home team	Score	Away team	Date
Airdrieonians	3–2	Albion Rovers	6 September 1976

=== Second leg ===
Home team	Score	Away team	Date	Agg
Albion Rovers	3–1	Airdrieonians	8 September 1976	5–4

== Quarter-finals ==
=== First leg ===
Home team	Score	Away team	Date
Aberdeen	1–0	Stirling Albion	22 September 1976
Albion Rovers	0–1	Celtic	22 September 1976
Heart of Midlothian	4–1	Falkirk	22 September 1976
Rangers	3–3	Clydebank	22 September 1976

=== Second leg ===
Home team	Score	Away team	Date	Agg
Celtic	5–0	Albion Rovers	6 October 1976	6–0
Clydebank	1–1	Rangers	6 October 1976	4–4
Falkirk	4–3	Heart of Midlothian	6 October 1976	5–7
Stirling Albion	1–0	Aberdeen	6 October 1976	1–1

=== Replays ===
Home team	Score	Away team	Date
Aberdeen	2–0	Stirling Albion	18 October 1976
Rangers	0–0	Clydebank	18 October 1976

=== Second Replay ===
Home team	Score	Away team	Date
Clydebank	1–2	Rangers	19 October 1976

== Semi-finals ==
=== Ties ===
Home team	Score	Away team	Date
Aberdeen	5–1	Rangers	27 October 1976
Celtic	2–1	Heart of Midlothian	25 October 1976

== Final ==
6 November 1976

Aberdeen	2–1 (a.e.t.)	Celtic
Jarvie; Robb		Dalglish

Hampden Park, Glasgow
Attendance: 69,707
