= Davie Robb =

Scottish footballer (1947–2022)

Personal information
- Full name: David Thomson Robb
- Date of birth: 15 December 1947
- Place of birth: Broughty Ferry, Scotland
- Date of death: 9 July 2022 (aged 74)
- Position: Forward

Senior career*
Years	Team	Apps	(Gls)
1966–1977	Aberdeen	251	(77)
1977–1978	Tampa Bay Rowdies	42	(21)
1978	Tampa Bay Rowdies (indoor)	1	(1)
1978–1979	Norwich City	5	(1)
1979	Philadelphia Fury	30	(16)
1979–1980	Philadelphia Fever (indoor)	12	(1)
1980	Vancouver Whitecaps	15	(0)
1980	Tulsa Roughnecks	12	(4)
1980–1981	Dunfermline Athletic	3	(0)
Total		358	(119)

International career
1969–1971	Scotland U23	3	(1)
1971	Scotland	5	(0)
- * Club domestic league appearances and goals

David Thomson Robb (15 December 1947 – 9 July 2022) was a Scottish footballer who played for Aberdeen, Tampa Bay Rowdies, Norwich City, Philadelphia Fury, Vancouver Whitecaps, Tulsa Roughnecks, Dunfermline Athletic and the Scotland national team.

== Career ==
Davie Robb was born in Broughty Ferry, Dundee in 1947. Affectionately known to Aberdeen supporters as "The Brush", Robb scored 99 goals in 345 appearances with Aberdeen. He scored the winning goal for Aberdeen in the 1976 Scottish League Cup Final. Upon leaving Aberdeen, he played in the US and Canada, and had a short spell at English club Norwich City, before returning to Scotland to play three games for Dunfermline Athletic. He retired from football in 1981 and died in July 2022.

== Career statistics ==
=== Club ===
Appearances and goals by club, season and competition
Club		Seasons	League		National Cup		League Cup		Europe		Total	
Club		Seasons	Apps	Goals	Apps	Goals	Apps	Goals	Apps	Goals	Apps	Goals
Aberdeen	1966–67	Scottish Division One	3	1	1	0	0	0	0	0	4	1
Aberdeen	1967–68	Scottish Division One	18	3	3	1	2	0	2	0	25	4
Aberdeen	1968–69	Scottish Division One	26	9	6	4	5	1	3	1	40	15
Aberdeen	1969–70	Scottish Division One	34	16	4	3	8	0	0	0	46	19
Aberdeen	1970–71	Scottish Division One	32	9	4	1	6	3	2	0	44	13
Aberdeen	1971–72	Scottish Division One	34	10	2	0	6	1	4	0	46	11
Aberdeen	1972–73	Scottish Division One	19	4	2	0	10	3	2	0	33	7
Aberdeen	1973–74	Scottish Division One	21	11	1	0	3	0	3	1	28	12
Aberdeen	1974–75	Scottish Division One	6	4	0	0	0	0	0	0	6	4
Aberdeen	1975–76	Scottish Premier Division	32	4	2	1	6	0	0	0	40	5
Aberdeen	1976–77	Scottish Premier Division	13	1	2	0	4	1	0	0	19	2
Aberdeen	1977–78	Scottish Premier Division	13	5	0	0	1	0	0	0	14	5
Aberdeen		Total	251	77	27	10	51	9	16	2	345	98
Tampa Bay Rowdies	1977	North American Soccer League	15	8	0	0	0	0	-	-	15	8
Tampa Bay Rowdies	1978	North American Soccer League	27	13	0	0	0	0	-	-	27	13
Tampa Bay Rowdies		Total	42	21	0	0	0	0	-	-	42	21
Tampa Bay Rowdies (indoor)	1978	North American Soccer League	1	1	0	0	0	0	-	-	1	1
Norwich City	1978–79	First Division	5	1	0	0	0	0	-	-	5	1
Philadelphia Fury	1979	North American Soccer League	30	16	0	0	0	0	-	-	30	16
Philadelphia Fever (indoor)	1979–80	Major Indoor Soccer League	12	1	0	0	0	0	-	-	12	1
Vancouver Whitecaps	1980	North American Soccer League	15	0	0	0	0	0	-	-	15	0
Tulsa Roughnecks	1980	North American Soccer League	12	4	0	0	0	0	-	-	12	4
Dunfermline Athletic	1980–81	Scottish First Division	3	0	0	0	0	0	-	-	3	0
Career total			371	121	27	10	51	9	16	2	465	142

=== International ===
Appearances and goals by national team and year
National team	Year	Apps	Goals
Scotland	1971	5	0
Total		5	0

== Honours ==
- Scottish Cup: 1969–70
- Scottish League Cup: 1976–77
- NASL Soccer Bowl: 1978 –finalist
