= 1986–87 Bradford City A.F.C. season =

Bradford City A.F.C.
1986-87 season
- Division Two: 10th Place
- FA Cup: 4th Round
- Milk Cup: 4th Round

The 1986–87 Bradford City A.F.C. season was the 74th in the club's history.

The club finished 10th in Division Two, reached the 4th round of the FA Cup, and the 4th round of the Milk Cup.

Following damage to home stadium Valley Parade at the end of the 1984–85 season, Bradford City continued to play 'home' games on 'neutral' ground, Odsal in the city, until Valley Parade reopened on 26 December 1986.

== Sources ==
- Frost, Terry (1988). Bradford City A Complete Record 1903-1988. Breedon Books Sport. ISBN 0-907969-38-0.
