= Henning Boel =

Danish footballer (born 1945)

Personal information
- Full name: Henning Boel
- Date of birth: 15 August 1945 (age 81)
- Place of birth: Ikast, Denmark
- Position: Defender

Senior career*
| Years | Team | Apps | (Gls) |
- Ikast FS
| 1968 | Boston Beacons | 3 | (0) |
| 1968 | Washington Whips | 15 | (0) |
| 1969–1972 | Aberdeen | 105 | (2) |
| 1974–1975 | Boston Minutemen | 27 | (1) |
- Ikast FS
| Total | | 150 | (3) |

International career
| 1965–1966 | Denmark u-21 | 5 | (0) |
| 1966–1971 | Denmark | 15 | (0) |
- * Club domestic league appearances and goals

Henning Boel (born 15 August 1945) is a Danish former football player, who played professionally in the United States and Scotland. He most notably won the 1970 Scottish Cup with Aberdeen, and was inducted into the Aberdeen FC "Hall of Fame" as one of the founding members in 2003. Boel also played 15 games for the Danish national team.

== Playing career ==
Boel began his footballing career, playing as a defender, for amateur club Ikast FS in his childhood town of Ikast. While at Ikast, Boel became a regular in the Danish national team, earning five Under-21 caps and 13 of his 15 full caps from 1965 to 1967. When the professional North American Soccer League was founded in 1968, Boel moved to the US, playing three games for Boston Beacons, then fifteen for the Washington Whips. As the Danish FA had a strict rule of amateurism for the Danish national team, Boel was automatically barred from playing any further national team games.

He was recruited by Scottish team Aberdeen in early 1969, having been spotted during the club's tour of the US the previous summer. During his time in Aberdeen, Boel became a favourite of the Scottish team's fans, and was a part of the Aberdeen team which won the 1969–70 Scottish Cup trophy, beating Celtic 3–1 in the final, which he himself feels is his greatest footballing achievement.

Boel resumed his international career, albeit briefly, in 1971. When the Danish rule of amateurism was abolished in May 1971, Boel was a part of the first Danish national team composed of professional players. The Danish team lost 0–5 to Portugal, and Boel played his 15th and last national team game as Denmark lost 1–2 to Belgium two weeks later. An injury sustained in a UEFA Cup tie against Borussia Mönchengladbach in 1972 signalled the end of his time in Scotland as he found it difficult to regain his place in the Aberdeen side.

Having recovered from his injury, Boel returned to the Boston area after his time at Aberdeen. He went on to play for the Boston Minutemen from 1974 to 1975. He later served as public relations representative and manager for the New England Tea Men. He finished his career where it started, back in Denmark with Ikast. Following his retirement from the game, he worked in the sports equipment and the telecommunications industries.

== Career statistics ==
=== Club ===
Appearances and goals by club, season and competition
| Club | Season | League | | | National Cup | | League Cup | | Europe | | Total | |
| Club | Season | Division | Apps | Goals | Apps | Goals | Apps | Goals | Apps | Goals | Apps | Goals |
|---|---|---|---|---|---|---|---|---|---|---|---|---|
| Boston Beacons | 1968 | NASL | 3 | 0 | – | – | – | – | – | – | 3 | 0 |
| Washington Whips | 1968 | NASL | 15 | 0 | – | – | – | – | – | – | 15 | 0 |
| Aberdeen | 1968–69 | Scottish Division One | 15 | 0 | 6 | 0 | 0 | 0 | 0 | 0 | 21 | 0 |
| Aberdeen | 1969–70 | Scottish Division One | 28 | 0 | 5 | 0 | 7 | 0 | 0 | 0 | 40 | 0 |
| Aberdeen | 1970–71 | Scottish Division One | 34 | 2 | 4 | 1 | 5 | 1 | 2 | 0 | 45 | 4 |
| Aberdeen | 1971–72 | Scottish Division One | 14 | 0 | 1 | 0 | 5 | 0 | 2 | 0 | 22 | 0 |
| Aberdeen | 1972–73 | Scottish Division One | 7 | 0 | 0 | 0 | 4 | 0 | 2 | 0 | 13 | 0 |
| Aberdeen | 1973–74 | Scottish Division One | 7 | 0 | 1 | 0 | 1 | 0 | 0 | 0 | 9 | 0 |
| Aberdeen | Total | | 105 | 2 | 17 | 1 | 22 | 1 | 6 | 0 | 150 | 4 |
| Boston Minutemen | 1974 | NASL | 10 | 1 | – | – | – | – | – | – | 10 | 1 |
| Boston Minutemen | 1975 | NASL | 17 | 0 | – | – | – | – | – | – | 17 | 0 |
| Boston Minutemen | Total | | 27 | 1 | - | - | - | - | - | - | 27 | 1 |
| Career total | | | 150 | 3 | 17 | 1 | 22 | 1 | 6 | 0 | 195 | 5 |

=== International ===
Appearances and goals by national team and year
| National team | Year | Apps | Goals |
|---|---|---|---|
| Denmark | 1966 | 6 | 0 |
| Denmark | 1967 | 7 | 0 |
| Denmark | 1968 | — | |
| Denmark | 1969 | — | |
| Denmark | 1970 | — | |
| Denmark | 1971 | 2 | 0 |
| Total | | 15 | 0 |
