= 1970–71 Aberdeen F.C. season =

Aberdeen F.C.
1970–71 season
- Chairman: Dick Donald
- Manager: Eddie Turnbull
- Scottish League Division One: 2nd
- Scottish Cup: Quarter final
- Scottish League Cup: Group stage
- European Cup Winners Cup: First round
- Top goalscorer: League: Joe Harper (19); All: Joe Harper (27)
- Highest home attendance: 36,000 vs. Rangers, 20 February 1971; 36,000 vs. Celtic, 17 April 1971
- Lowest home attendance: 1,200 vs. Airdrieonians, 22 August 1970
- Average home league attendance: 17,029
Home colours

The 1970–71 season was Aberdeen's 59th season in the top flight of Scottish football and their 60th season of Club. Aberdeen competed in the Scottish League Division One, Scottish League Cup, Scottish Cup, and European Cup Winners' Cup.

Aberdeen finished second in the league behind Celtic and became the first club to be knocked out of European competition in a penalty shoot-out when they lost to Hungarian club Honvéd. Goalkeeper Bobby Clark achieved a record by going 1,155 minutes without conceding a goal in the league, which was surpassed in 2009 by Manchester United goalkeeper Edwin Van der Sar. On 6 February, a fire destroyed part of the Main Stand at Pittodrie. The Scottish Cup trophy was saved by firemen, but many historical club artifacts and items of memorabilia were destroyed.

== Squad ==
=== Appearances & Goals ===
| No. | Pos | Nat | Player | Total | | Division One | | Scottish Cup | | League Cup | | Europe | |
| No. | Pos | Nat | Player | Apps | Goals | Apps | Goals | Apps | Goals | Apps | Goals | Apps | Goals |
|---|---|---|---|---|---|---|---|---|---|---|---|---|---|
| | DF | (Denmark) DEN | Henning Boel | 45 | 4 | 34 | 2 | 4 | 1 | 5 | 1 | 2 | 0 |
| | MF | (Scotland) SCO | George Buchan | 14 | 1 | 12 | 1 | 0 | 0 | 1 | 0 | 1 | 0 |
| | DF | (Scotland) SCO | Martin Buchan (c) | 46 | 2 | 34 | 2 | 4 | 0 | 6 | 0 | 2 | 0 |
| | GK | (Scotland) SCO | Bobby Clark | 46 | 0 | 34 | 0 | 4 | 0 | 6 | 0 | 2 | 0 |
| | FW | (Scotland) SCO | Jim Forrest | 44 | 12 | 32 | 8 | 4 | 3 | 6 | 1 | 2 | 0 |
| | FW | (Scotland) SCO | Arthur Graham | 43 | 5 | 31 | 5 | 4 | 0 | 6 | 0 | 2 | 0 |
| | FW | (Scotland) SCO | Jim Hamilton | 9 | 2 | 6 | 2 | 0 | 0 | 2 | 0 | 1 | 0 |
| | FW | (Scotland) SCO | Joe Harper | 42 | 27 | 31 | 19 | 4 | 2 | 5 | 5 | 2 | 1 |
| | DF | (Scotland) SCO | Jim Hermiston | 43 | 1 | 31 | 1 | 4 | 0 | 6 | 0 | 2 | 0 |
| | FW | (Scotland) SCO | Derek McKay | 3 | 0 | 2 | 0 | 0 | 0 | 0 | 0 | 1 | 0 |
| | MF | (Scotland) SCO | Tommy McMillan | 37 | 1 | 27 | 1 | 4 | 0 | 6 | 0 | 0 | 0 |
| | DF | (Scotland) SCO | George Murray | 13 | 0 | 5 | 0 | 2 | 0 | 6 | 0 | 0 | 0 |
| | MF | (Scotland) SCO | Steve Murray | 44 | 9 | 33 | 6 | 4 | 0 | 5 | 1 | 2 | 2 |
| | FW | (Scotland) SCO | Davie Robb | 44 | 13 | 32 | 9 | 4 | 1 | 6 | 3 | 2 | 0 |
| | FW | (Scotland) SCO | Ian Taylor | 20 | 5 | 16 | 4 | 4 | 1 | 0 | 0 | 0 | 0 |
| | DF | (Scotland) SCO | Jim Whyte | 1 | 0 | 0 | 0 | 0 | 0 | 1 | 0 | 0 | 0 |
| | DF | (Scotland) SCO | Billy Williamson | 1 | 0 | 1 | 0 | 0 | 0 | 0 | 0 | 0 | 0 |
| | MF | (Scotland) SCO | Alex Willoughby | 25 | 2 | 19 | 2 | 4 | 0 | 1 | 0 | 1 | 0 |
| | DF | (Scotland) SCO | Willie Young | 10 | 0 | 9 | 0 | 0 | 0 | 0 | 0 | 1 | 0 |

== Results ==
Own goals in italics

=== Scottish League First Division ===
| Match Day | Date | Opponent | H/A | Score | Aberdeen Scorer(s) | Attendance |
|---|---|---|---|---|---|---|
| 1 | 29 August | Airdrieonians | H | 1–1 | Harper | 9,000 |
| 2 | 5 September | Dundee | A | 2–1 | Harper, Hamilton | 8,000 |
| 3 | 12 September | St Johnstone | H | 0–0 | | 10,000 |
| 4 | 19 September | Kilmarnock | A | 4–0 | Arthur, Boel, Hamilton, Harper | 6,000 |
| 5 | 26 September | Hibernian | H | 3–0 | Robb, Forrest, Harper | 13,000 |
| 6 | 3 October | Greenock Morton | A | 0–2 | | 7,000 |
| 7 | 10 October | Dunfermline Athletic | H | 3–2 | M. Buchan, Graham (2) | 10,000 |
| 8 | 17 October | Rangers | A | 2–0 | Jackson, Harper | 39,763 |
| 9 | 24 October | St Mirren | A | 3–1 | S. Murray, Forrest, Robb | 3,000 |
| 10 | 31 October | Dundee United | H | 4–0 | S. Murray, Robb, Harper (2) | 10,000 |
| 11 | 7 November | Clyde | H | 3–0 | Harper (2), Hermiston | 13,000 |
| 12 | 14 November | Ayr United | A | 1–0 | Harper | 11,000 |
| 13 | 21 November | Heart of Midlothian | H | 1–0 | Harper | 13,500 |
| 14 | 28 November | Motherwell | A | 2–0 | Boel, Taylor | 10,000 |
| 15 | 5 December | Cowdenbeath | H | 7–0 | Harper (3), Kinnel (2), S. Murray, Graham | 14,000 |
| 16 | 12 December | Celtic | A | 1–0 | Harper | 63,000 |
| 17 | 19 December | Falkirk | H | 1–0 | Harper | 19,000 |
| 18 | 26 December | Airdrieonians | A | 4–0 | Harper (2), S. Murray, Taylor | 8,000 |
| 19 | 1 January | Dundee | H | 3–0 | S. Murray, McMillan, Graham | 24,000 |
| 20 | 2 January | St Johnstone | A | 1–0 | Forrest | 21,500 |
| 21 | 9 January | Kilmarnock | H | 3–0 | Willoughby, Robb, Forrest | 18,000 |
| 22 | 16 January | Hibernian | A | 1–2 | Robb | 23,400 |
| 23 | 30 January | Greenock Morton | H | 3–1 | Taylor (2), Harper | 18,000 |
| 24 | 6 February | Dunfermline Athletic | A | 0–1 | | 9,000 |
| 25 | 20 February | Rangers | H | 0–0 | | 36,000 |
| 26 | 27 February | St Mirren | H | 1–1 | Forrest | 15,000 |
| 27 | 10 March | Dundee United | A | 2–0 | M. Buchan, Forrest | 7,000 |
| 28 | 13 March | Clyde | A | 2–1 | S. Murray, Forrest | 4,500 |
| 29 | 24 March | Ayr United | H | 4–1 | S. Murray, Forrest, Robb, Graham | 18,000 |
| 30 | 27 March | Heart of Midlothian | A | 3–1 | Robb (3) | 13,500 |
| 31 | 3 April | Motherwell | H | 0–0 | | 13,000 |
| 32 | 10 April | Cowdenbeath | A | 2–1 | Bostock, G. Buchan | 4,000 |
| 33 | 17 April | Celtic | H | 1–1 | Willoughby | 36,000 |
| 34 | 24 April | Falkirk | A | 0–1 | | 8,000 |

==== Final standings ====
| Pos | Team | Pld | W | D | L | GF | GA | GD | Pts | Qualification or relegation |
|---|---|---|---|---|---|---|---|---|---|---|
| 1 | Celtic | 34 | 25 | 6 | 3 | 89 | 23 | +66 | 56 | Champion |
| 2 | Aberdeen | 34 | 24 | 6 | 4 | 68 | 18 | +50 | 54 | |
| 3 | St Johnstone | 34 | 19 | 6 | 9 | 59 | 44 | +15 | 44 | |
| 4 | Rangers | 34 | 16 | 9 | 9 | 58 | 34 | +24 | 41 | |
| 5 | Dundee | 34 | 14 | 10 | 10 | 53 | 45 | +8 | 38 | |

Source: Soccerbase and League Tables

=== Scottish League Cup ===
Aberdeen failed to qualify from section 4 of the League Cup.

==== Group 4 ====
| Round | Date | Opponent | H/A | Score | Aberdeen Scorer(s) | Attendance |
|---|---|---|---|---|---|---|
| 1 | 8 August | Airdrieonians | A | 1–1 | S. Murray | 3,500 |
| 2 | 12 August | St Johnstone | H | 2–1 | Robb, Harper | 13,500 |
| 3 | 15 August | Hibernian | H | 1–1 | Robb | 16,000 |
| 4 | 19 August | St Johnstone | A | 1–0 | Forrest | 3,300 |
| 5 | 22 August | Airdrieonians | H | 7–3 | Boel, Robb, Harper (4), Jonquin | 12,000 |
| 6 | 26 August | Hibernian | A | 0–4 | | 24,900 |

==== Group 4 final table ====
| Team | Pld | W | D | L | GF | GA | GD | Pts |
|---|---|---|---|---|---|---|---|---|
| Hibernian | 6 | 4 | 2 | 0 | 16 | 7 | +9 | 10 |
| Aberdeen | 6 | 3 | 2 | 1 | 12 | 10 | +2 | 8 |
| Airdrieonians | 6 | 2 | 1 | 3 | 10 | 15 | −5 | 5 |
| St Johnstone | 6 | 0 | 1 | 5 | 3 | 9 | −6 | 1 |

=== Scottish Cup ===
Aberdeen, the defending champions of the Scottish Cup, were knocked out by Rangers in the quarter-final.

| Round | Date | Opponent | H/A | Score | Aberdeen Scorer(s) | Attendance |
|---|---|---|---|---|---|---|
| R3 | 25 January | Elgin City | H | 5–0 | Taylor, Forrest (2), Harper (2) | 24,136 |
| R4 | 13 February | Dundee United | A | 1–1 | Forrest | 24,000 |
| R4 R | 17 February | Dundee United | H | 2–0 | Boel, Robb | 29,000 |
| QF | 6 March | Rangers | A | 0–1 | | 65,000 |

=== Europe ===
Aberdeen made history by becoming the first club to be knocked out of European competition on penalty kicks.

| Round | Date | Opponent | H/A | Score | Aberdeen Scorer(s) | Attendance |
|---|---|---|---|---|---|---|
| R1 L1 | 16 September | (Hungary) Honvéd | H | 3–1 | S. Murray, Harper, Graham | 21,500 |
| R1 L2 | 30 September | (Hungary) Honvéd | A | 1–3 | S. Murray | 18,500 |
