= Drew Jarvie =

Scottish footballer

Personal information
- Full name: Andrew Jarvie
- Date of birth: 5 October 1948 (age 78)
- Place of birth: Annathill, North Lanarkshire, Scotland
- Position: Forward

Youth career
- Kilsyth Rangers

Senior career*
Years	Team	Apps	(Gls)
1967–1972	Airdrieonians	142	(51)
1972–1982	Aberdeen	275	(86)
1982–1984	Airdrieonians	27	(5)
1984–1986	St Mirren	16	(3)
Total		460	(145)

International career
1971	Scotland	3	(0)
1971	Scottish League XI	1	(0)
- * Club domestic league appearances and goals

Andrew Jarvie (born 5 October 1948) is a Scottish former footballer, known mostly for his time with Aberdeen.

At Aberdeen he made 386 appearances (53 as substitute) and scored 131 goals as well winning the Scottish League Cup and Scottish League. On joining Aberdeen in 1972, he became the then-record signing for Aberdeen, having cost £72,000, and formed a successful partnership with Joe Harper. Before he joined Aberdeen, he played for Airdrieonians, where he formed a prolific partnership with Drew Busby. After leaving Aberdeen in 1982, he played for Airdrie again and then had a spell with St Mirren. He was capped three times by the Scotland national side while with Airdrie in 1971.

Since retirement, he has and continues to be involved in various coaching capacities including at former club Aberdeen alongside Alex Smith and Jocky Scott. Jarvie also served as Ian Porterfield's assistant at South Korean club Busan I'Cons during the 2003 K-League season.

In December 2008, Jarvie recovered from major heart valve repair surgery, having had regular hospital appointments monitoring the condition for a considerable period before.

Jarvie is an inductee of the Aberdeen Hall of Fame and was rewarded for his service with a testimonial in 1982 against Ipswich Town.

== Career statistics ==
=== Club ===
Appearances and goals by club, season and competition
Club	Seasons	League			Scottish Cup		League Cup		Europe		Total	
Club	Seasons	Division	Apps	Goals	Apps	Goals	Apps	Goals	Apps	Goals	Apps	Goals
Airdrieonians	1967–68	Scottish Division One	19	6	-	-	-	-	-	-	19+	6+
Airdrieonians	1968–69	Scottish Division One	27	5	-	-	-	-	-	-	27+	5+
Airdrieonians	1969–70	Scottish Division One	34	16	-	-	-	-	-	-	34+	16+
Airdrieonians	1970–71	Scottish Division One	34	16	-	-	-	-	-	-	34+	16+
Airdrieonians	1971–72	Scottish Division One	28	8	-	-	-	-	-	-	34+	8+
Airdrieonians	Total		142	51	-	-	-	-	-	-	142+	51+
Aberdeen	1972–73	Scottish Division One	34	15	4	1	11	10	2	2	51	28
Aberdeen	1973–74	Scottish Division One	32	13	1	0	10	7	4	4	47	24
Aberdeen	1974–75	Scottish Division One	32	9	4	1	6	3	0	0	42	13
Aberdeen	1975–76	Scottish Premier Division	32	4	2	0	4	1	0	0	38	5
Aberdeen	1976–77	Scottish Premier Division	20	9	1	0	6	2	0	0	27	11
Aberdeen	1977–78	Scottish Premier Division	35	12	6	2	6	2	2	1	49	17
Aberdeen	1978–79	Scottish Premier Division	27	4	4	0	6	1	4	3	41	8
Aberdeen	1979–80	Scottish Premier Division	30	13	4	1	8	1	2	0	44	15
Aberdeen	1980–81	Scottish Premier Division	23	5	1	1	4	2	3	0	31	8
Aberdeen	1981–82	Scottish Premier Division	10	2	1	0	5	0	0	0	16	2
Aberdeen	Total		275	86	28	6	66	29	17	10	386	131
Airdrieonians	1982–83	Scottish First Division	21	4	-	-	-	-	-	-	21+	4+
Airdrieonians	1983–84	Scottish First Division	6	1	-	-	-	-	-	-	6+	1+
Airdrieonians	Total		27	5	-	-	-	-	-	-	27+	5+
St Mirren	1983–84	Scottish Premier Division	13	2	-	-	-	-	-	-	13+	2+
St Mirren	1984–85	Scottish Premier Division	1	0	-	-	-	-	-	-	1+	0+
St Mirren	1985–86	Scottish Premier Division	2	1	-	-	-	-	-	-	2+	1+
St Mirren	Total		16	3	-	-	-	-	-	-	20	3
Career total			460	145	28+	6+	66+	29+	17+	10+	575+	190+

=== International ===
Appearances and goals by national team and year
National team	Year	Apps	Goals
Scotland	1971	3	0
Total		3	0

== Honours ==
=== Player ===
Kilsyth Rangers

- Scottish Junior Cup: 1966–67

Aberdeen

- Scottish Premier Division: 1979–80
- Scottish League Cup: 1976–77
- Drybrough Cup: 1980

=== Coach ===
Aberdeen

- Scottish Youth Cup: 2000–01

Dundee (Note: Dundee manager Jocky Scott handed over managerial responsibility to assistant Jarvie for the competition.)

- Tennents' Sixes: 1988
