= Bertie Miller =

Scottish footballer

Personal information
- Full name: Robert Morgan Miller
- Date of birth: 25 January 1949 (age 77)
- Place of birth: Lochgelly, Scotland
- Position: Midfielder

Youth career
- Lochore Welfare

Senior career*
Years	Team	Apps	(Gls)
1965–1966	Rangers	0	(0)
1966–1971	East Fife	152	(47)
1971–1973	Aberdeen	49	(6)
1973–1975	East Fife	57	(15)
1975–1979	Montrose	120	(24)
1979–1982	Raith Rovers	73	(9)
1982–1984	Cowdenbeath	52	(9)
Total		503	(110)
- * Club domestic league appearances and goals

Robert Morgan Miller (born 25 January 1949) is a former professional footballer who played as a winger.

Miller was born in Lochgelly and played junior football with Lochore Welfare before starting his professional career with Rangers in 1965. After one season at Ibrox, he joined East Fife in 1966. In September 1971, Aberdeen manager Jimmy Bonthrone paid East Fife £35,000 to sign Miller (including Jim Hamilton as part of the deal). In December 1973 he rejoined East Fife, and later played for Montrose (from October 1975), Raith Rovers (from August 1979) Cowdenbeath (from February 1982) before retiring in 1984.

== See also ==
- List of footballers in Scotland by number of league appearances (500+)
