= Walker McCall =

Scottish footballer

Personal information
- Date of birth: 29 March 1954 (age 72)
- Place of birth: Irvine, Scotland
- Position: Striker

Youth career
- –1973: Hurlford United

Senior career*
Years	Team	Apps	(Gls)
1973–1976	Aberdeen	23	(8)
1976–1978	Ayr United	78	(34)
1978	St Johnstone	6	(0)
1978–1980	San Diego Sockers	47	(18)
1980	Atlanta Chiefs	14	(2)
1980–1983	Aberdeen	27	(14)
1983	South China		
1983–1986	Dundee	57	(14)
- * Club domestic league appearances and goals

Walker McCall (born 29 March 1954 in Irvine) is a Scottish retired professional footballer who played in Scotland, the United States, and Hong Kong.

== Career ==
Beginning as an apprentice at Hurlford United, McCall played professionally in Scotland for Aberdeen, Ayr United, St Johnstone and Dundee, in the United States for the San Diego Sockers and the Atlanta Chiefs, and in Hong Kong for South China.
