= Willie Miller =

Scottish footballer & manager (born 1955)

Willie Miller MBE
Personal information
- Full name: William Ferguson Miller
- Date of birth: 2 May 1955 (age 71)
- Place of birth: Glasgow, Scotland
- Height: 5 ft 10 in (1.78 m)
- Position: Central defender

Youth career
- 1969–1971: Eastercraigs Boys Club

Senior career*
Years	Team	Apps	(Gls)
1971–1990	Aberdeen	560	(21)
1971–1972	→ Peterhead (loan)		

International career
1977	Scotland U21	2	(0)
1974–1976	Scotland U23	9	(0)
1975–1989	Scotland	65	(1)
1976	Scottish League XI	1	(0)

Managerial career
- 1992–1995: Aberdeen
- * Club domestic league appearances and goals

William Ferguson Miller MBE (born 2 May 1955) is a Scottish former professional football player and manager, who made a club record 560 league appearances for Aberdeen. Sir Alex Ferguson described Miller as "the best penalty box defender in the world".

== Club career ==
Born in Glasgow, Miller was raised in the Bridgeton area of Glasgow. He had little interest in football as a child, and when he did become drawn to the game he played initially as a goalkeeper. He was scouted by several professional clubs while playing as a forward with Glasgow Schools and Eastercraigs Boys Club.

Having been on unofficial schoolboy terms in 1969, Miller signed full-time for Aberdeen in 1971 at the age of 16 and spent a season on loan with Peterhead in the Highland League, scoring 24 goals; upon his return he was converted to a central defender/sweeper in the reserves on the advice of Teddy Scott, winning the SFL Reserve Cup in 1973, established himself in that position in the first team in place of Henning Boel, and by 1975 had been made captain by manager Ally MacLeod.

Miller's central defensive partnership with Alex McLeish was integral to Aberdeen's success in the 1980s, as they won all the major domestic honours and the European Cup Winners' Cup in 1983. He made at least 40 appearances for Aberdeen in 14 consecutive seasons, amassing a total of 12 trophies won as well as appearing in several other finals. His total of 797 competitive appearances for the club is comfortably (by more than 100 matches) the all-time record.

He retired from playing in 1990 due to an injury picked up whilst playing for Scotland. A farewell testimonial match in his honour took place in December 1990 with Aberdeen facing a 'World Cup XI' (featuring Kenny Dalglish, David O'Leary, Mark Hughes and Danny McGrain among others) at Pittodrie Stadium. He had already received a testimonial in 1981 against Tottenham Hotspur.

In 2003, Willie Miller was voted the greatest Aberdeen player of all time in a poll to mark the club's centenary. In 2015 it was no surprise when he was named in Aberdeen's 'greatest ever team' by supporters of the club.

Miller was voted Scottish Football Writers' and SPFA Players' Player of the Year in 1984. He had been runner-up for the SFWA award in 1983.

== International career ==
Having appeared at under-21 and under-23 level, Miller won 65 full international caps for Scotland between 1975 and 1989, scoring one goal. His 50th cap came against West Germany during the 1986 FIFA World Cup. His international career was effectively ended by an injury suffered during the last game of 1990 FIFA World Cup qualification. Although he did not play in the 1990 FIFA World Cup finals, Miller was presented with the match ball from Scotland's 1–0 loss to Brazil to thank him for his contribution to Scottish football.

He was an inaugural inductee to the Scottish Football Hall of Fame in 2004, and is also on the international roll of honour, having won 50 international caps. In 2010, Miller was chosen as one of the eleven members of Scotland's Greatest Team, by viewers of the Scottish Television documentary series, which sought the fans' opinion on the best Scotland players since the 1960s. Viewers also chose Alex McLeish as his partner in central defence.

== Managerial career ==
In February 1992, he was appointed Aberdeen manager, replacing the sacked Alex Smith. Despite two second-place finishes in the league and two losing cup finals in 1992–93, Miller was sacked in February 1995 with the club in danger of being relegated for the first time in its history (survival was eventually achieved via a playoff).

In May 2004, Miller was appointed to the Aberdeen board and given executive responsibility for football. He played a large role in the appointment of Jimmy Calderwood (a friend from their Glasgow Schools days) as manager, as well as progressing the club's youth academy.

In June 2011, he was appointed as Aberdeen's Director of Football Development, with the responsibility of finding new playing talent for the club. He departed again in 2012.

== Career outside football ==
Miller has worked for the BBC, particularly for Radio Scotland, as a football commentator and analyst. He has written two autobiographies, The Miller's Tale and The Don, the latter being published in 2007. His third book, Willie Miller's Aberdeen Dream Team, was published in 2011.

During the 2014 Scottish independence referendum Miller was a supporter of the Better Together campaign against Scottish independence.

== Career statistics ==
=== Club ===
Appearances and goals by club, season and competition
Club	Season	League		Scottish Cup		Scottish League Cup		Europe		Total	
Club	Season	Apps	Goals	Apps	Goals	Apps	Goals	Apps	Goals	Apps	Goals
Aberdeen	1972–73	1	0	0	0	0	0	0	0	1	0
Aberdeen	1973–74	31	1	1	0	9	0	4	0	46	0
Aberdeen	1974–75	34	1	4	1	6	0	0	0	44	2
Aberdeen	1975–76	36	0	2	1	6	0	0	0	44	1
Aberdeen	1976–77	36	0	3	0	8	0	0	0	47	0
Aberdeen	1977–78	36	2	6	0	6	0	2	0	50	2
Aberdeen	1978–79	34	0	5	1	8	0	4	0	51	1
Aberdeen	1979–80	31	1	5	1	8	0	2	0	46	2
Aberdeen	1980–81	33	2	1	0	6	0	4	0	44	2
Aberdeen	1981–82	36	0	6	0	10	0	6	0	58	0
Aberdeen	1982–83	36	2	5	0	8	0	11	1	60	3
Aberdeen	1983–84	34	2	7	1	9	1	10	0	60	4
Aberdeen	1984–85	35	3	6	0	1	0	2	0	43	3
Aberdeen	1985–86	33	1	6	1	6	0	6	1	51	3
Aberdeen	1986–87	36	2	3	0	2	0	2	0	43	2
Aberdeen	1987–88	42	3	6	0	5	0	4	0	57	3
Aberdeen	1988–89	22	1	0	0	5	2	2	0	29	3
Aberdeen	1989–90	15	0	0	0	5	0	2	0	22	0
Aberdeen	1990–91	0	0	0	0	1	0	0	0	1	0
Career total		560	21	66	6	109	3	61	2	797	32

=== International ===
Appearances and goals by national team and year
National team	Year	Apps	Goals
Scotland	1975	1	0
Scotland	1978	1	0
Scotland	1979	1	0
Scotland	1980	6	1
Scotland	1981	7	0
Scotland	1982	5	0
Scotland	1983	9	0
Scotland	1984	6	0
Scotland	1985	8	0
Scotland	1986	8	0
Scotland	1987	4	0
Scotland	1988	7	0
Scotland	1989	2	0
Total		65	1

Scores and results list Scotland's goal tally first, score column indicates score after each Miller goal.

List of international goals scored by Willie Miller
No.	Date	Venue	Opponent	Score	Result	Competition
1	21 May 1980	Hampden Park, Glasgow, Scotland	Wales	1–0	1–0	1979–80 British Home Championship

== Managerial record ==
Team	From	To	Record				
Team	From	To	P	W	L	D	Win %
Aberdeen	February 1992	February 1995	155	72	50	33	46.45

== Honours ==
=== Player ===
Peterhead

- Aberdeenshire Cup: 1971–72

Aberdeen

- Scottish Premier Division: 1979–80, 1983–84, 1984–85
- Scottish Cup: 1981–82, 1982–83, 1983–84, 1985–86; finalist 1977–78
- Scottish League Cup: 1976–77, 1985–86, 1989–90; finalist four other times
- Drybrough Cup: 1980
- European Cup Winners' Cup: 1982–83
- European Super Cup: 1983

Scotland

- The Rous Cup: 1985

=== Manager ===
- Scottish Cup: runner-up 1992–93
- Scottish League Cup: runner-up 1992–93
- Aberdeenshire Cup: 1992–93

=== Individual ===
- PFA Scotland Players' Player of the Year: 1984
- SFWA Footballer of the Year: 1984
- Scottish Football Personality of the Year: 1984
- Scotland national football team roll of honour: 1986
- Scottish Football Hall of Fame: 2004

== See also ==
- List of footballers in Scotland by number of league appearances (500+)
- List of one-club men in association football
- List of Scotland national football team captains
