= Dick Donald =

Scottish footballer (1911–1993)

Personal information
- Full name: Richard MacNaughton Donald
- Date of birth: 20 February 1911
- Place of birth: Aberdeen, Scotland
- Date of death: 30 December 1993 (aged 82)
- Place of death: Aberdeen, Scotland
- Position: Utility player

Senior career*
Years	Team	Apps	(Gls)
1928–1933	Aberdeen	12	(2)
1933–1934	Dunfermline Athletic		
1934–1939	Aberdeen	4	(0)
- * Club domestic league appearances and goals

Richard MacNaughton Donald (20 February 1911 – 30 December 1993) was a Scottish footballer, businessman and football administrator. He is best known for his time as Chairman of Aberdeen during the club's most successful period in the 1980s, but he was also an important figure in the family firm, which operated cinemas, theatres and dancehalls in Aberdeen. He was inducted into the Aberdeen "Hall of Fame" as one of the founding members in 2003.

== Early life ==
Donald was born in Aberdeen, the youngest of four brothers. Their father, James F Donald, ran a popular dancing academy in the city, and each of the boys was taught to dance, and to teach dancing. Donald senior expanded the family business by opening a chain of cinemas, and also owned His Majesty's Theatre and an ice rink in the city. Each of the brothers played a part in the family business, with Peter going on to become chairman of the Howard and Wyndham theatre group, which ran 18 theatres across the UK. During Dick Donald's playing career (see below), he was also manager of the Cinema House cinema, and was popular among his playing colleagues for the number of tickets he could provide.

== Playing career ==
Donald signed for Aberdeen as a professional in 1928, and had a playing career which consisted of two five-year spells at his hometown club, interrupted by one season at Dunfermline Athletic in 1933–34. Donald was a versatile player, who is reported to have played in every outfield position for Aberdeen. He ended his playing career at the outbreak of World War II, but continued to be a successful businessman, and rejoined Aberdeen as a board member in 1949.

== Football administrator and later life ==
Donald served on the board of directors of Aberdeen from 1949 until his death in 1993, becoming vice-chairman in 1960, and chairman ten years later. The club enjoyed unprecedented success during his chairmanship, winning each of the Scottish domestic trophies more than once, and becoming the only Scottish team to win two European trophies in 1983. Donald had a reputation for running the club frugally – his most famous manager, Sir Alex Ferguson recounts several tales of his chairman's parsimony in his autobiography, but also notes that

As a chairman, he was a colossus, and nobody had to tell me that I had little chance of ever working for his like again.

Another of Donald's managers, Ian Porterfield, observed:

I have been all over the world, and worked with many different people including Nelson Mandela on the day of his inauguration, but one of the best men I ever met was Mr Dick Donald he epitomised what Aberdeen was all about.

For the majority of the most successful years at Aberdeen, the board of directors consisted of Donald, his vice-chairman Chris Anderson and Donald's son Ian. Ferguson felt that the arrangement, with Anderson and Donald complementing each other's strengths, was the best he had worked for. Donald was also among many who attended the funeral of boxer Feab S. Williams (better known as "George Godfrey").

Donald died, following a stroke and a battle with Alzheimer's disease in 1993, shortly after the dedication of the Richard Donald Stand at Pittodrie, Aberdeen's home ground.
