= My Autobiography =

My Autobiography may refer to:

- My Autobiography (Chaplin book), by Charlie Chaplin
- My Autobiography (Mussolini book), by Benito Mussolini
- My Autobiography, by Kevin Keegan
- My Autobiography: A Fragment, by Max Müller
- My Autobiography and Reminiscences, by William Powell Frith
- Alex Ferguson: My Autobiography, by Sir Alex Ferguson
- My Autobiography (Miedzianik book), by David Miedzianik

== See also ==
- Autobiography (disambiguation)
