= Autobiography (disambiguation) =

An autobiography is a book or other work about the life of a person, written by that person.

Autobiography may also refer to:

- Autobiography (Morrissey book)
- Autobiography (Nat Adderley album)
- Autobiography (Abdullah Ibrahim album)
- Autobiography (Ashlee Simpson album), or the title track
- Autobiography (film), 2022 internationally co-produced film
- Auto-Biography (Le Car album)
- John Cowper Powys's Autobiography
- Autobiography, the autobiography of British philosopher John Stuart Mill
- The Autobiography or John Major: The Autobiography, a 1999 political memoir by the former British prime minister
- "Autobiography", a song by British rapper from his 2021 album Conflict of Interest

== See also ==
- An Autobiography (Nehru)
- The Autobiography (Vic Mensa album)
- My Autobiography (disambiguation)
