= Broomloan Road Primary School =

Former school building in Glasgow, Scotland

Coordinates: 55.857°N 4.309°W

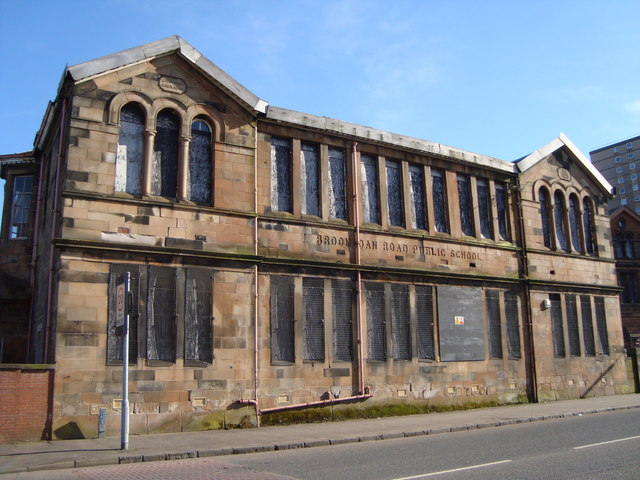
The original 1875 Broomloan Road School building designed by Alexander Watt

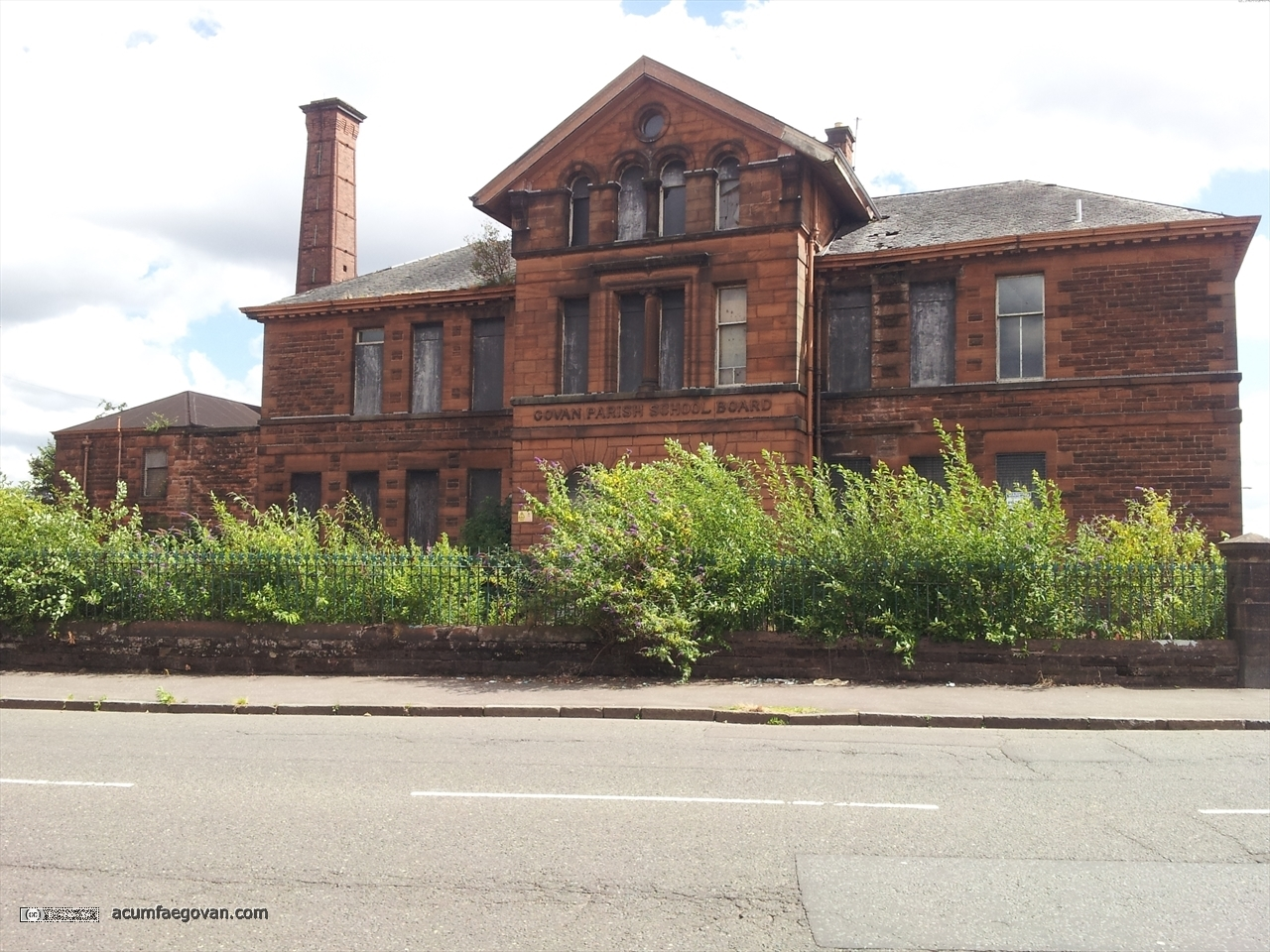
The later 1894 Broomloan Road School building designed by H&D Barclay

Broomloan Road Primary School was a primary school situated in Govan, Glasgow, Scotland.

It was the largest School in Govan built by Govan School Board, and comprised two separate buildings. The first, designed by Alexander Watt, opened in 1875. In 1894 a red sandstone extension was built, designed by H&D Barclay. Broomloan Road Primary School closed in the late 1960s.

After closure the red sandstone building was used by St. Saviour's Infants throughout the 1970s and as St. Gerards annexe after St. Saviour's Infants moved to a new school in Dunsmuir Street. In the early 1980s the building became the Summertown Community Centre before closing in the early 1990s. The older yellow sandstone building became Broomloan Road Nursery School in the late 1970s and was closed in the early 1990s after the nursery moved to St. Gerards Secondary School.

Both buildings were closed in the mid-2000s, boarded up and left in a derelict condition for many years. They were protected as a category B listed building.

The yellow sandstone building designed by Alexander Watt was almost completely destroyed by a fire in May 2014. The 1894 building later went on fire in September 2014. Both buildings have been subsequently demolished entirely.

It is most notable for being the first school of Sir Alex Ferguson, the former manager of Manchester United Football Club. He attended Broomloan Road and later Govan High School.
