= John Major: The Autobiography =

1999 political memoir by John Major

- Author: John Major
- Language: English
- Genre: Memoir
- Published: 11 October 1999
- Publisher: HarperCollins
- Publication place: United Kingdom
- Pages: 774
- ISBN: 0001056093

John Major: The Autobiography (sometimes simply The Autobiography) is a memoir by former British Prime Minister and Leader of the Conservative Party John Major, published by HarperCollins, on 11 October 1999. It covers Major's life up until that point, including his decade on the frontbench under Margaret Thatcher and his time in Number 10.

== Synopsis ==
The memoir covers Major's life from his family origins, through his conservative "apprenticeships" of the Young Conservatives and local government, as well as his two bids for parliament in St Pancras, to his win in 1976 in Huntingdonshire. It goes on to cover his 11 years in various cabinet posts. Much of the book's coverage of Major's premiership is focussed on the country's relationship with Europe, and the problems that caused with in the Conservative Party.

== Publication ==
The autobiography was published in serialised extracts in the week leading up to its release.

== Reception ==
=== Critical reception ===
Writing in The Guardian, Kenneth Baker, a Home Secretary under Major, opined that it was "a balanced book from a balanced man", treating Major's colleagues with even handedness. Comparing the book to the simultaneously released memoir by Norman Lamont, In Office, a review in The Daily Telegraph found Major's the superior book, having a much broader scope. In fact, the reviewer thought it the "finest government memoir since Nigel Lawson's", and "deeply-moving" at times. Roy Jenkins, in the Evening Standard, concurred placing it "well within the higher range of political pièces justificatives" and felt it a "partial but rational chronicle of events". A review in The Sun Times was particularly drawn to the description of Major's childhood and family.

At the end of the year, the Historian and biographer John Campbell called it one of his books of the year. In retrospect the book was still held in high regard, with political biographer Sonia Purnell calling it a "readable tome about an ambitious politician" and the i newspaper calling it one of the top 20 political memoirs, with Major's writing being "candid, frank and self-reflective".

=== Commercial reception ===
As the book released on the same day as Norman Lamont's In Office, there was interest in which of the two memoirs would be more successful. Even before they went on sale, Major was seen as the winner with his launch drawing hundreds, far more that Lamont's. The Autobiography would go on to be a number one bestseller surpassing autobiographies by Alex Ferguson and Geri Halliwell. Within about a month it had sold about 70,000, according to the publisher (compared to 619 for In Office). In the end, sales totaled 91,513, according to Nielsen Book Research.
