= Autobiography (Morrissey book) =

2013 book

- Author: Morrissey
- Cover artist: Paul Spencer at Rebecca Valentine Agency
- Language: English
- Genre: Autobiography
- Publisher: Penguin Books (UK, Commonwealth and Europe), G. P. Putnam's Sons (US)
- Publication date: 17 October 2013 (UK, Commonwealth and Europe), 3 December 2013 (US)
- Publication place: United Kingdom
- Media type: Print (paperback) and e-book
- Pages: 457 pp (first edition)
- ISBN: 978-0-141-39481-7 (first edition)

Autobiography is a book by the British singer-songwriter Morrissey, published in October 2013.

It was published under the Penguin Classics imprint. It was a number one best-seller in the UK and received polarised reviews, with certain reviewers hailing it as brilliant writing and others decrying it as overwrought and self-indulgent.

== Publication ==
Morrissey mentioned that he had begun work on his autobiography in a radio interview in 2002. An extract from Autobiography titled "The Bleak Moor Lies" was published in 2009 as part of The Dark Monarch: Magic & Modernity in British Art, a compendium published by Tate St Ives art gallery. The extract tells the story of Morrissey and a few companions seeing what they believed to be a ghost near the Yorkshire village of Marsden in 1989. In 2011, Morrissey said in an interview that he had completed the book and was looking for a publisher. He expressed interest having the book published as a Penguin Classic.

A few days before the book's apparently scheduled, but unannounced, release on 16 September 2013, Morrissey issued a statement explaining that a content dispute with Penguin Books meant that publication would be delayed and that he was seeking a new publisher. The book's subsequent European release, on 17 October 2013, caused controversy as it was published under the Penguin Classics imprint, normally reserved for highly esteemed deceased authors.

On the day of the book's publication, Morrissey undertook a signing session in Gothenburg, with some fans queuing up to 30 hours in advance.

The book was published in the United States on 3 December 2013 by G. P. Putnam's Sons. An audiobook, read by David Morrissey (no relation), was released on 5 December 2013.

== Content ==
The book is not divided into chapters, and its opening paragraph lasts four and a half pages. The book covers Morrissey's childhood and adolescence, his period as lead singer with the Smiths, his subsequent solo career and his courtroom battles with Smiths drummer Mike Joyce, who successfully sued him and former bandmate Johnny Marr for unpaid royalties in the 1990s. He writes extensively about the television programmes, literature and music that influenced him, devoting many pages to the New York Dolls, whom he persuaded to reform in the early 2000s. The book includes a number of descriptions of people Morrissey has worked with which his biographer Tony Fletcher calls "character assassinations". Fletcher describes the depiction of Rough Trade Records boss Geoff Travis as particularly unflattering. Morrissey writes in the book about two serious romantic relationships he has had with a woman and a man. In the days following the book's release, he issued a statement emphasising that he did not consider himself to be gay: "I am attracted to humans. But, of course, not many".

The book was not issued with an index, although an informal and unauthorised "online index" created by a fan was released on 22 May 2014.

== Reception ==
Autobiography became the number one selling book in the UK upon release, setting a new first week sales record for a music autobiography. It also topped the non-fiction chart in Ireland.

Neil McCormick in The Daily Telegraph gave the book a 5-star review that called it "the best written musical autobiography since Bob Dylan's Chronicles", while Boyd Tonkin in The Independent criticised the book's "droning narcissism" as well as the behaviour of its publisher for issuing it in their Classics series.

John Harris wrote on The Guardian website, "for its first 150 pages, Autobiography comes close to being a triumph", but focuses unduly on Morrissey's legal battles with Mike Joyce; "the verbiage dedicated to this stuff threatens to eclipse what he has to say about every other aspect of his career". Stuart Maconie in The Observer described the opening section of the book as "brilliant" but stated that the section on the Smiths is "both sketchy and wearisomely exhaustive". Literary critic Terry Eagleton, in The Guardian itself, wrote: "There is a relish and energy about its prose that undercuts his misanthropy. Its lyrical quality suggests that beneath the hard-bitten scoffer there lurks a romantic softie, while beneath that again lies a hard-bitten scoffer."

A. A. Gill, who won the Hatchet Job of the Year for his review in The Sunday Times, wrote: "What is surprising is that any publisher would want to publish the book, not because it is any worse than a lot of other pop memoirs, but because Morrissey is plainly the most ornery, cantankerous, entitled, whingeing, self-martyred human being who ever drew breath. And those are just his good qualities."

Preceded by Mad About the Boy by Helen Fielding	UK number one selling book 22 October 2013 (one week)	Succeeded by My Autobiography by Alex Ferguson
Preceded by The Rocky Road by Eamon Dunphy	Ireland number one selling non-fiction book 22 October 2013	Succeeded by My Autobiography by Alex Ferguson
