= Alex Ferguson: My Autobiography =

2013 autobiography by Sir Alex Ferguson

- Author: Sir Alex Ferguson
- Language: English
- Subject: The autobiography of former football manager Alex Ferguson
- Genre: Autobiography
- Publisher: Hodder & Stoughton
- Publication date: 30 October 2013
- Publication place: United Kingdom
- Media type: Print (hardcover)
- Pages: 416
- ISBN: 0340919396

Alex Ferguson: My Autobiography is the second official autobiography of Alex Ferguson, the former football manager and player. It was released on 30 October 2013 and covers the period from 2000 to 2013.

== Synopsis ==
Ferguson says that he saw Manchester United "change from a conventional football club to what is now a major business enterprise and he never failed to move with the times." He says that it was nothing other than his "man-management" skills that helped him to deal with the global stars. His relationship with Cristiano Ronaldo has got special importance in the book. He says that he never wanted Ronaldo to join Real Madrid. In this book, he also expresses his feelings about players such as David Beckham and Ryan Giggs.

== Reception ==
One reader criticized the book for containing numerous factual errors, prompting publishers Hodder & Stoughton to offer him a refund.

Preceded by Autobiography by Morrissey	UK number one selling book 29 October 2013 (two weeks)	Succeeded by Diary of a Wimpy Kid: Hard Luck by Jeff Kinney
