= Govan High School =

School in Glasgow, Scotland

Coordinates: 55.85821°N 4.33239°W

Govan High School is a secondary school situated in Govan, Glasgow, Scotland. It opened on its current site in 1969 and in 2010 it celebrated its centenary, with Sir Alex Ferguson (a former pupil) and Paul Wilson attending the event.

== Notable alumni ==
- Leo Blair (attended 1934–1938), the father of Tony Blair, former Prime Minister of the United Kingdom
- Sir Alex Ferguson (attended 1954–1958) – professional footballer and manager of Manchester United from 1986 to 2013.
