= James Lawton =

British sports journalist and biographer (1943–2018)

James Lawton (28 July 1943 – 27 September 2018) was a British sports journalist and biographer.

Born in Flintshire, Wales, Lawton began working for the Flintshire Leader at the age of 16. In 1963 he started working as a sub-editor at the Daily Telegraph, before moving to the Daily Express, where he first worked as a sports reporter. After several years working at the Vancouver Sun in Canada, he returned to the Express as its chief sports writer before moving to The Independent as its Chief Sports Writer.

He reported on a wide range of sports, including football, boxing, cricket, golf, rugby, tennis and athletics, and was described as "one of the last of a golden era of writers who became integral parts of the sporting landscape through the power of their prose". He also collaborated with several leading sports personalities, including Bobby Charlton, on their autobiographies. He was named Sports Writer of the Year by the Sports Journalists’ Association in 1988, and later also won Sports Journalist of the Year in the British Press Awards. In 2005, he was named the SJA’s Columnist of the Year and in 2006 he also won their Feature Writer of the Year award.

He died, aged 75, at his retirement home in Italy in 2018.
