= Alex Ferguson =

Scottish football manager (born 1941)

Sir Alex Ferguson CBE
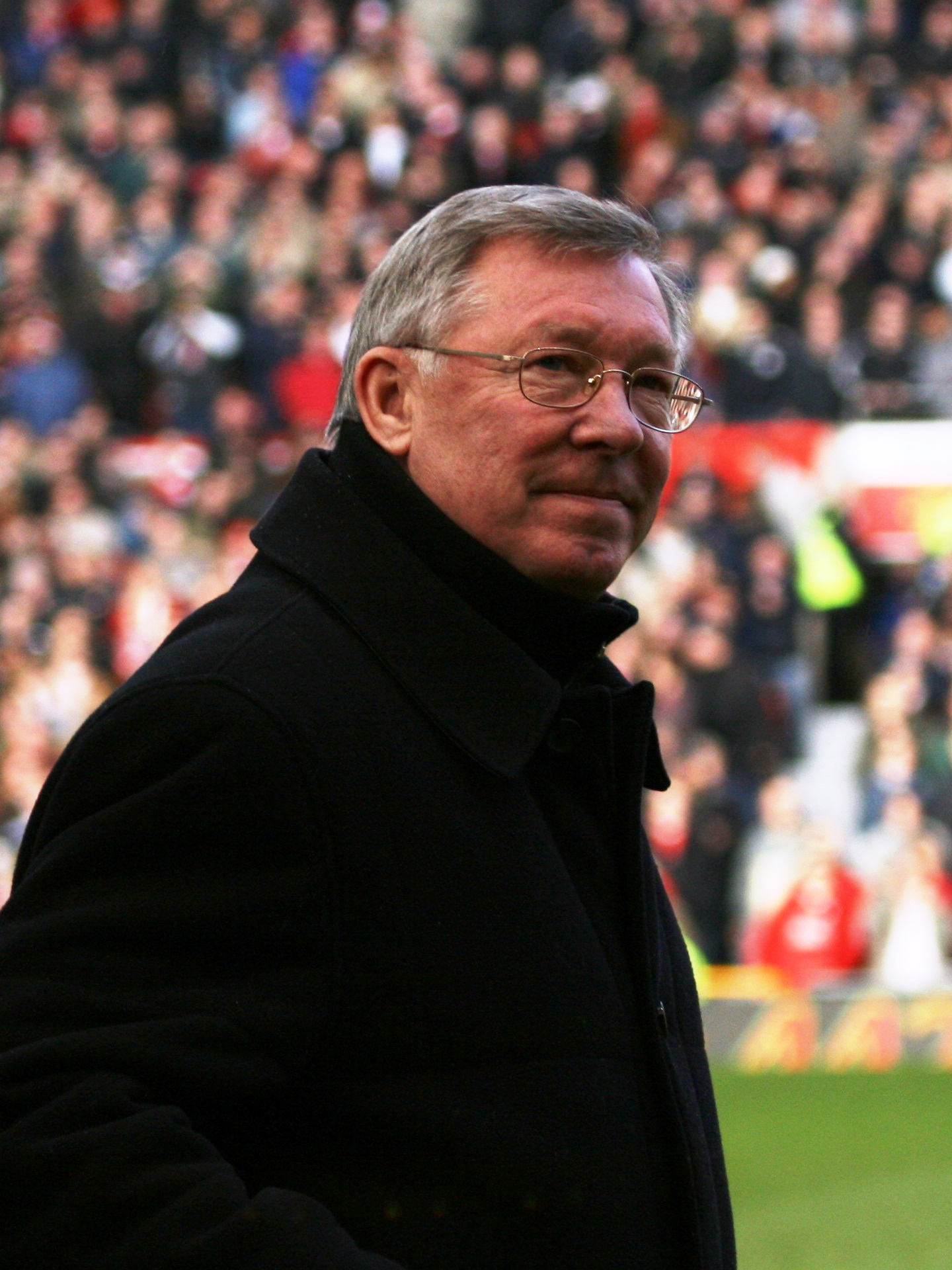
- Ferguson in 2006

Personal information
- Full name: Alexander Chapman Ferguson
- Date of birth: 31 December 1941 (age 84)
- Place of birth: Glasgow, Scotland
- Position: Forward

Youth career
- Harmony Row Boys Club
- Drumchapel Amateurs

Senior career*
Years	Team	Apps	(Gls)
1957–1960	Queen's Park	31	(15)
1960–1964	St Johnstone	37	(19)
1964–1967	Dunfermline Athletic	89	(66)
1967–1969	Rangers	41	(25)
1969–1973	Falkirk	95	(37)
1973–1974	Ayr United	24	(9)
Total		317	(171)

International career
1960	Scotland Amateurs	1	(1)
1967	Scotland	4	(3)
1967	Scottish Football League XI	2	(1)

Managerial career
- 1974: East Stirlingshire
- 1974–1978: St Mirren
- 1978–1986: Aberdeen
- 1985–1986: Scotland
- 1986–2013: Manchester United
- * Club domestic league appearances and goals

Sir Alexander Chapman Ferguson (born 31 December 1941), also known as Sir Alex or by the nickname Fergie, is a Scottish former professional football manager and player, best known for managing Manchester United from 1986 to 2013. Widely regarded as one of the greatest managers of all time, Ferguson has won more trophies than any other manager in the history of football. He is often credited for valuing youth during his time at Manchester United, particularly in the 1990s with the "Class of '92", who contributed to making the club one of the most successful in the world.

Ferguson played as a forward for several Scottish clubs, including Dunfermline Athletic and Rangers, and was a Scottish international, earning four caps. While playing for Dunfermline, he was the top goalscorer in the Scottish league during the 1965–66 season. Towards the end of his playing career, he also worked as a coach, then started his managerial career with East Stirlingshire and St Mirren. Ferguson then enjoyed a highly successful period as manager of Aberdeen, winning three Scottish league championships, four Scottish Cups and both the UEFA Cup Winners' Cup and the UEFA Super Cup in 1983. He briefly managed Scotland following the death of Jock Stein, taking the team to the 1986 World Cup.

Ferguson was appointed manager of Manchester United in November 1986. During his 26 years with Manchester United, he won 38 trophies, including 13 Premier League titles, five FA Cups, and two UEFA Champions League titles, in 1999, which completed the first continental treble by an English club, and in 2008. He was knighted in the 1999 Queen's Birthday Honours list for his services to the game. He was among the inaugural inductees into the English Football Hall of Fame in 2002, and the Scottish Football Hall of Fame in 2004. He is the longest-serving manager of Manchester United, having overtaken Sir Matt Busby's record on 19 December 2010. He retired from management at the end of the 2012–13 season, having won the Premier League in his final season.

== Early life ==
Alexander Chapman Ferguson was born on 31 December 1941 at his grandmother's home on Shieldhall Road in the Govan district of Glasgow, the son of Elizabeth (née Hardie) and Alexander Beaton Ferguson. His father was a plater's helper in the shipbuilding industry. He grew up in a tenement at 667 Govan Road, which has since been demolished, where he lived with his parents and his younger brother Martin, who also became a footballer. He attended Broomloan Road Primary School and later Govan High School. He began his football career with Harmony Row Boys Club in Govan, before progressing to Drumchapel Amateurs, a youth club with a strong reputation for producing senior footballers. He also took an apprenticeship as a toolmaker at a factory in Hillington, being appointed a union shop steward.

== Playing career ==
=== Club ===
Ferguson's playing career began as an amateur with Queen's Park, where he made his debut as a striker, aged 16. He described his first match as a "nightmare", but scored Queen's Park's goal in a 2–1 defeat against Stranraer. Perhaps his most notable game for Queen's Park was the 7–1 defeat away to Queen of the South on Boxing Day 1959 when ex-England international Ivor Broadis scored four of the Queen of the South goals. Ferguson was the solitary Queen's Park goalscorer.

Despite scoring 20 goals in his 31 games for Queen's Park, he could not command a regular place in the side and moved to St Johnstone in 1960. Ferguson was on a part-time contract with St Johnstone, and he combined working in a Govan shipyard with training at night in Perth. Although he regularly scored goals for St Johnstone, he was unable to command a consistent place in their team. He regularly requested transfers, and even considered emigrating to Canada. St Johnstone's failure to sign another forward led the manager to select Ferguson for a match against Rangers, in which he scored a hat-trick in a surprise 3–2 victory at Ibrox.

Dunfermline signed him the following summer (1964), and Ferguson became a full-time professional footballer. In the following season (1964–65) Dunfermline were strong challengers for the Scottish league title and reached the Scottish Cup final, but Ferguson was dropped for the final after a poor performance in a league game against St Johnstone. Dunfermline lost the final 3–2 to Celtic, then failed to win the League by one point. The 1965–66 season saw Ferguson notch up 45 goals in 51 games for Dunfermline. Along with Joe McBride of Celtic, he was the top goalscorer in the Scottish league with 31 goals.

Ferguson then joined Rangers for £65,000, which was a record fee for a transfer between two Scottish clubs. He performed well in Europe during his two seasons with the club, scoring six goals in nine appearances in the Inter-Cities Fairs Cup including two against 1.FC Köln in the 1967–68 competition, and an important strike against Athletic Bilbao in the 1968–69 edition which helped Rangers into the semi-finals, but on both occasions they were knocked out by English opposition. He was blamed for a goal conceded in the 1969 Scottish Cup final, in a match in which he was designated to mark Celtic captain, Billy McNeill, and was subsequently forced to play for the club's junior side instead of for the first team. According to his brother, Ferguson was so upset by the experience that he threw his losers' medal away.

There have been claims that he suffered discrimination at Rangers due to his marriage to a Catholic, Cathy Holding. Ferguson said in a 2021 documentary film about his life and career (Sir Alex Ferguson: Never Give In) that he "assumed" that his exclusion from the first team after the 1969 cup final was due to her religion. His autobiography noted that Rangers had known of his wife's religion when he joined the club. In March 2021, he added that when he was signed, a Rangers director had questioned whether the Fergusons had been married in a (Catholic) chapel, and that the director had replied "oh, that's okay" when told they had married in a registry office. Ferguson left Rangers reluctantly, as he had grown up locally and had dreamed of succeeding there. He was upset by how newspapers would refer to him as an "ex-Rangers player" after he had left, and rarely attended gatherings of their former players.

The following October, Nottingham Forest wanted to sign Ferguson, but his wife was not keen on moving to England at that time, so he went to Falkirk instead. He remained at Brockville for four years, gaining more league appearances than he had elsewhere; in recognition of his experience he was promoted to player-coach, but when John Prentice became manager he removed Ferguson's coaching responsibilities. Ferguson's time at Falkirk was soured by this, and he responded by requesting a transfer and moved to Ayr United, where he finished his playing career in 1974.

=== International ===
Ferguson's only involvement with the Scotland national team was during an overseas tour in 1967. For many years none of the tour matches were recognised by the Scottish Football Association as full internationals, and so Ferguson was deemed to have never played for Scotland. A BBC Sport article in June 2020 identified him as one of the best Scottish players to have never played a full international. The SFA announced in October 2021 that some of the tour matches would be reclassified as full internationals, which meant that Ferguson was belatedly awarded an international cap.

== Managerial career ==
=== East Stirlingshire ===
In June 1974, Ferguson was appointed manager of East Stirlingshire, at the comparatively young age of 32. It was a part-time job that paid £40 per week, and the club did not have a single goalkeeper at the time. He gained a reputation as a disciplinarian, with club forward Bobby McCulley later saying he had "never been afraid of anyone before but Ferguson was a frightening bastard from the start."

=== St Mirren ===
In October 1974, Ferguson was invited to manage St Mirren. While they were below East Stirlingshire in the league, they were a bigger club and although Ferguson felt a degree of loyalty towards East Stirlingshire, he decided to join St Mirren after taking advice from Jock Stein.

Ferguson was manager of St Mirren from 1974 until 1978, producing a remarkable transformation of a team in the lower half of the old Second Division watched by crowds of just over 1,000, to First Division champions in 1977, discovering talent like Billy Stark, Tony Fitzpatrick, Lex Richardson, Frank McGarvey, Bobby Reid and Peter Weir while playing superb attacking football. The average age of the league winning team was 19 and the captain, Fitzpatrick, was 20.

St Mirren have the distinction of being the only club ever to sack Ferguson. He claimed wrongful dismissal against the club at an industrial tribunal but lost and was given no leave to appeal. According to a Sunday Herald article on 30 May 1999, the official version is that Ferguson was sacked for various breaches of contract, including unauthorised payments to players. He was counter-accused of intimidating behaviour towards his office secretary because he wanted players to get some expenses tax free. He did not speak to her for six weeks, confiscated her keys and communicated only through a 17-year-old assistant. The tribunal concluded that Ferguson was "particularly petty" and "immature". It was claimed during the tribunal by St Mirren chairman, Willie Todd, that Ferguson had "no managerial ability".

In 2008, The Guardian published an interview with Todd (then aged 87), who had sacked Ferguson many years earlier. Todd said that the fundamental reason for the dismissal was a breach of contract relating to Ferguson having agreed to join Aberdeen. Ferguson told journalist Jim Rodger of the Daily Mirror that he had asked at least one member of the squad to go to Aberdeen with him. He told the St Mirren staff he was leaving. Todd expressed regret over what happened but blamed Aberdeen for not approaching his club to discuss compensation.

In 1977, Ferguson turned down the manager's job at Aberdeen. The role went to Billy McNeill, who returned to Celtic after only a year, leaving the role available for Ferguson once again.

=== Aberdeen ===
==== Late 1970s ====
Ferguson joined Aberdeen as manager in June 1978. Although Aberdeen were one of Scotland's major clubs they had won the league only once, in 1955 under Dave Halliday. The team had been playing well, however, and had not lost a league match since the previous December, having finished second in the league the previous season. Ferguson had now been a manager for four years, but was still not much older than some of the players and had trouble winning the respect of some of the older ones such as Joe Harper. The season did not go especially well, with Aberdeen reaching the semi-final of the Scottish Cup and the Scottish League Cup Final, but losing both matches and finishing fourth in the league.

Aberdeen lost the 1979–80 Scottish League Cup Final, this time to Dundee United after a replay. Ferguson took the blame for the defeat, saying he should have made changes to the team for the replay.

==== 1980s and silverware ====
Aberdeen had started the 1979–80 season poorly but their form improved dramatically in the new year and they won the Scottish league that season with a 5–0 win on the final day. It was the first time in 15 years that the league had not been won by either Rangers or Celtic. Ferguson now felt that he had the respect of his players, later saying: "That was the achievement which united us. I finally had the players believing in me". In the 1980–81 European Cup, Ferguson had his first taste of Anfield as an opposition manager as his team lost 4–0 to Bob Paisley's Liverpool in what was the only time the two dominant managers faced each other. Prior to the tie, Ferguson and his assistant Archie Knox had been to Anfield to watch Liverpool in a league game, and in the directors' box they met Bill Shankly, with Ferguson stating he and Knox started to "behave like a couple of groupies".

Ferguson was still a strict disciplinarian, and his players nicknamed him "Furious Fergie". He fined one of his players, John Hewitt, for overtaking him on a public road, and kicked a tea urn at the players at half time after a poor first half. In the six hour journey back to Aberdeen after the heavy defeat to Liverpool, Gordon Strachan recalls: "He actually banned the players from laughing on the team coach on our journey back. 'Anyone who laughs will be fined £10' he said. And he kept looking back, trying to catch one of us out." Ferguson was dissatisfied with the atmosphere at Aberdeen matches, and deliberately created a "siege mentality" by accusing the Scottish media of being biased towards the Glasgow clubs, to motivate the team. The team continued their success with a Scottish Cup win in 1982. Ferguson was offered the manager's job at Wolverhampton Wanderers but turned it down as he felt that Wolves were in trouble and his "ambitions at Aberdeen were not even half fulfilled".

==== European success and Scottish national side ====
Ferguson led Aberdeen to even greater success the following season, 1982–83. They had qualified for the European Cup Winners' Cup as a result of winning the Scottish Cup the previous season, and impressively knocked out Bayern Munich, who had beaten Tottenham Hotspur 4–1 in the previous round. According to Willie Miller, this gave them the confidence to believe that they could go on to win the competition, which they did, with a 2–1 victory over Real Madrid in the final on 11 May 1983. Aberdeen became only the third Scottish team to win a European trophy and Ferguson now felt that "he'd done something worthwhile with his life". This was followed up with victory in the European Super Cup in December 1983, when Hamburger SV, the reigning European Cup champions, were beaten 2–0 over two legs. Aberdeen had also performed well in the league that season, and retained the Scottish Cup with a 1–0 victory over Rangers, but Ferguson was not happy with his team's play in that match and upset the players by describing theirs as a "disgraceful performance" in a televised interview after the match, a statement he later retracted.

After a sub-standard start to the 1983–84 season, Aberdeen's form improved and the team won the Scottish league and retained the Scottish Cup. Ferguson was appointed an OBE in the 1985 New Year Honours, and was offered the managers' jobs at Rangers and Arsenal during the season. Aberdeen retained their league title in the 1984–85 season. In 1985–86, Aberdeen won both domestic cups, but finished fourth in the league. In 1985 he had told Dick Donald, their chairman, that he intended to leave that summer. Ferguson: "I said I needed a new challenge, I needed to try something else. He asked me if I had a club and. I said no. He said I would get a club, but his advice was, 'Don’t go unless Manchester United come in for you'".

Ferguson had been part of the coaching staff for the Scottish national side during qualifying for the 1986 World Cup, but manager Jock Stein had collapsed and died on 10 September 1985 – at the end of the game in which Scotland qualified from their group for a play-off against Australia. Ferguson promptly agreed to take charge of the Scottish national side against the Australians and subsequently at the World Cup. To allow him to fulfil his international duties he appointed Archie Knox as his co-manager at Aberdeen. However, after Scotland failed to progress past the group stages of the World Cup, Ferguson stepped down as national team manager on 15 June 1986.

Around this time, Tottenham Hotspur offered Ferguson the chance to take over from Peter Shreeves as manager, but he rejected this offer and the job went to Luton Town's David Pleat instead. There was also an offer for Ferguson to replace Don Howe as Arsenal manager, but he rejected this offer as well, and fellow Scot George Graham took the post instead. That summer, there had been speculation that he would take over from Ron Atkinson at Manchester United, who had slumped to fourth in the English top flight after a ten-match winning start.

It was not the first time that Ferguson had been linked with a move to England. In February 1982, Wolverhampton Wanderers had approached him about succeeding John Barnwell as manager as they were heading for relegation from the First Division. He rejected this offer, perhaps concerned about the club's financial stability, as they were more than £2 million in debt at the time and narrowly avoided going out of business. At the end of the 1984–85 season, it was reported that Ferguson was being considered for the Liverpool manager's job after the retirement of Joe Fagan was announced, but the job was quickly accepted by Liverpool striker Kenny Dalglish.

Although Ferguson remained at Aberdeen over the summer, he did eventually join Manchester United when Atkinson was sacked in November 1986.

=== Manchester United ===
==== Appointment and first FA Cup title ====
Ferguson was appointed manager at Old Trafford on 6 November 1986. He was initially worried that many of the players, such as Norman Whiteside, Paul McGrath and Bryan Robson, were drinking too much and was "depressed" by their level of fitness, but he managed to increase the players' discipline and United climbed up the table to finish the season in 11th place, having been 21st (second from bottom) when he took over.

His first game in charge was a 2–0 defeat at Oxford United on 8 November, followed seven days later by a goalless draw at newly promoted Norwich City, and then his first win (1–0 at home to Queens Park Rangers) on 22 November. Results steadily improved as the season went on, and by the time they recorded what would be their only away win of the league campaign at title challengers and arch rivals Liverpool on Boxing Day, it was clear that United were on the road to recovery. The year 1987 began on a high note with a 4–1 victory over Newcastle United and United gradually pulled together in the second half of the season, with relatively occasional defeats on the way, and finished 11th in the final table. Ferguson's mother Elizabeth died of lung cancer, aged 64, three weeks after his appointment. Ferguson hired Archie Knox, his assistant at Aberdeen, in the same role at Manchester United in 1986.

In the 1987–88 season, Ferguson made several major signings, including Steve Bruce, Viv Anderson and Brian McClair. The new players made a positive contribution to a United team who finished in second place, nine points behind Liverpool, the club's highest finish since 1979–80. During the season, United played two friendly matches in Bermuda against the Bermuda national team and the Somerset Cricket Club. In the match against Somerset, both Ferguson himself and his assistant Archie Knox took to the field, with Knox even getting on the scoresheet. The match was Ferguson's only appearance for the Manchester United first team.

United were expected to do well when Mark Hughes returned to the club two years after leaving for Barcelona, alongside Jim Leighton from Aberdeen; but the 1988–89 season was a disappointment for them, finishing 11th in the league and losing 1–0 at home to Nottingham Forest in the FA Cup sixth round. They had begun the season slowly, going on a nine-match winless run throughout October and November (with one defeat and eight draws) before a run of generally good results took them to third place and the fringes of the title challenge by mid February. However, another run of disappointing results in the final quarter of the season saw them fall down to mid-table.

For the 1989–90 season, Ferguson further boosted his squad by paying large sums of money for midfielders Neil Webb, Mike Phelan, and Paul Ince, as well as defender Gary Pallister and winger Danny Wallace. The season began well with a 4–1 win over defending champions Arsenal on the opening day, but United's league form quickly turned sour. In September, United suffered a humiliating 5–1 away defeat against fierce rivals Manchester City. Following this and an early season run of six defeats and two draws in eight games, a banner declaring, "Three years of excuses and it's still crap ... ta-ra Fergie." was displayed at Old Trafford, and many journalists and supporters called for Ferguson to be sacked. Ferguson later described December 1989 as "the darkest period [he had] ever suffered in the game", as United ended the decade just outside the relegation zone.

Following a run of seven games without a win, Manchester United were drawn away to Nottingham Forest in the third round of the FA Cup. Forest were performing well that season and were in the process of winning the League Cup for the second season running, and it was expected that United would lose the match and Ferguson would consequently be sacked, but United won the game 1–0 due to a Mark Robins goal and eventually reached the final. This cup win is often cited as the match that saved Ferguson's Old Trafford career. United went on to win the FA Cup, beating Crystal Palace 1–0 in the final replay after a 3–3 draw in the first match, giving Ferguson his first major trophy as Manchester United manager. United's defensive frailties in the first match were blamed on goalkeeper Jim Leighton. Ferguson dropped Leighton for the replay, bringing in Les Sealey.

==== United's European firsts and Ferguson's seconds ====
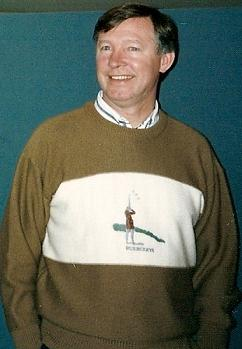
Ferguson in 1992

Although United's league form improved greatly in 1990–91, they were still inconsistent and finished sixth. There were some excellent performances that season, including a 6–2 demolition of Arsenal at Highbury, but results like an early 2–1 loss at newly promoted Sunderland, a 4–0 September hammering by Liverpool at Anfield, and a 2–0 home defeat by Everton in early March (the game where 17-year-old talented prospect Ryan Giggs made his senior debut) showed that United still had some way to go.

Even after the FA Cup victory in the previous season, some still had doubts about Ferguson's ability to succeed where all the other managers since Matt Busby had failed – to win the league title. They were runners-up in the League Cup, losing 1–0 to Sheffield Wednesday. However, they won the European Cup Winners' Cup, beating that season's Spanish champions Barcelona 2–1. It would be United's only Cup Winners' Cup title. After the match, Ferguson vowed that United would win the league the following season, and at long last he seemed to have won over the last of his sceptics after nearly five years in the job.

During the 1991 close season, Ferguson's assistant Archie Knox departed to Rangers to become assistant to Walter Smith, and Ferguson promoted youth team coach Brian Kidd to the role of assistant manager in Knox's place. He also made two major signings – goalkeeper Peter Schmeichel and defender Paul Parker – to bolster his side. There was much anticipation about the breakthrough of the young Ryan Giggs, who had played twice and scored once in the 1990–91 campaign, and the earlier emergence of another impressive young winger in the shape of Lee Sharpe, who despite their youth had made Ferguson feel able to resist plunging into the transfer market and buying a new player to take over from the disappointing Danny Wallace on the left wing. He had also added Soviet midfielder Andrei Kanchelskis to the right wing, giving him a more attacking alternative to older midfielders Mike Phelan and Bryan Robson.

The 1991–92 season did not live up to Ferguson's expectations and, in Ferguson's words, "many in the media felt that [his] mistakes had contributed to the misery". United won the League Cup and European Super Cup; both for the first time, but lost out on the league title to rivals Leeds United, confirmed after defeat to Liverpool at Anfield, having led the table for much of the season. A shortage of goals and being held to draws by teams they had been expected to beat in the second half of the campaign had proved to be the undoing of a United side who had performed so well in the first half of the season. Ferguson felt that his failure to secure the signing of Mick Harford from Luton Town had cost United the league, and that he needed "an extra dimension" to the team if they were to win the league the following season.

During the 1992 close season, Ferguson went on the hunt for a new striker. He first attempted to sign Alan Shearer from Southampton, but lost out to Blackburn Rovers. He also made at least one approach for the Sheffield Wednesday striker David Hirst, but manager Trevor Francis rejected all offers and the player stayed put. In the end, he paid £1 million for 23-year-old Cambridge United striker Dion Dublin – his only major signing of the summer.

After a slow start to the 1992–93 season by sitting 10th at the beginning of November, it looked as though United would miss out on the league title yet again. However, after the purchase of French striker Eric Cantona from Leeds for £1.2 million, the future of Manchester United, and Ferguson's position as manager, began to look bright. Cantona formed a strong partnership with Mark Hughes. On 10 April 1993, United were second in the league when they faced Sheffield Wednesday at home. United were losing with four minutes to go before Steve Bruce equalised. After seven minutes of injury time – which was subsequently dubbed "Fergie Time", alluding to extra minutes allegedly being granted to Ferguson's teams to get a goal – Bruce scored the 97th-minute winner, with Ferguson celebrating the goal by running from his dugout on to the touch line, while assistant Brian Kidd ran on to the field. Seen as being a decisive victory, it put United top of the league, where they remained. Winning the title ended United's 26-year wait for a league title, and also made them the first Premier League champions. United finished with a ten-point margin over runners-up Aston Villa, whose 1–0 defeat at Oldham Athletic on 2 May 1993 had given United the title. Ferguson was later voted Manager of the Year by the League Managers' Association.

==== 1993–95: Double win and loss ====
The 1993–94 season brought more success. Ferguson added Nottingham Forest's 22-year-old midfielder Roy Keane to the ranks for a British record fee of £3.75 million as a long term replacement for Bryan Robson, who was nearing the end of his career. United led the 1993–94 Premier League table virtually from start to finish. Ferguson was the first winner of the Premier League Manager of the Month award, introduced for the start of the 1993–94 season, when he collected the accolade for August 1993. Cantona was top scorer with 25 goals in all competitions despite being sent off twice in the space of five days in March 1994. United also reached the League Cup final but lost 3–1 to Aston Villa, managed by Ferguson's predecessor, Ron Atkinson. In the FA Cup final, Manchester United achieved an impressive 4–0 scoreline against Chelsea, winning Ferguson his second League and Cup Double, following his Scottish Premier Division and Scottish Cup titles with Aberdeen in 1984–85, though the League Cup final defeat meant that he had not yet achieved a repeat of the treble that he had achieved with Aberdeen in 1983.

Ferguson made only one close-season signing, paying Blackburn £1.2 million for David May. There were newspaper reports that Ferguson was also going to sign highly rated 21-year-old striker Chris Sutton from Norwich City, but the player headed for Blackburn instead. 1994–95 was a harder season for Ferguson. Cantona assaulted a Crystal Palace supporter in a game at Selhurst Park, and it seemed likely he would leave English football. An eight-month ban saw Cantona miss the final four months of the season. He also received a 14-day prison sentence for the offence but the sentence was quashed on appeal and replaced by a 120-hour community service order. United paid a British record fee of £7 million for Newcastle United's prolific striker Andy Cole, with young winger Keith Gillespie heading to the north-east in exchange. The season also saw the breakthrough of young players Gary Neville, Nicky Butt and Paul Scholes, who provided excellent cover for the long periods that United were left without some of their more experienced stars. However, the championship slipped out of Manchester United's grasp as they drew 1–1 with West Ham United on the final day of the season, when a win, with leaders Blackburn losing to Liverpool at Anfield, would have given them a third successive league title. On 20 May, six days after losing the league, United also lost the 1995 FA Cup final in a 1–0 defeat by Everton.

==== 1995–98 ====
Ferguson was heavily criticised in the summer of 1995 when three of United's star players were allowed to leave and replacements were not bought. First Paul Ince moved to Inter Milan for £7.5 million, long-serving striker Mark Hughes was sold to Chelsea in a £1.5 million deal, and Andrei Kanchelskis was sold to Everton. He had made up his mind to sell Ince after a 2–0 defeat to Liverpool at Anfield in March 1995 when Ince failed to stick to instructions by making an attacking run, vacating space in behind which was exploited by Liverpool's talisman Steve McManaman that led to the opening Liverpool goal. Believing Ince had an inflated sense of self-importance (he famously labelled Ince a "fucking big-time Charlie" for his Anfield display), three years later Ferguson would comment: "We lost the league at Anfield by not listening to instructions about McManaman."

In allowing established stars to leave Ferguson felt that United had a number of young players who were ready to play in the first team. The youngsters, who would be known as "Fergie's Fledglings", included Gary Neville, Phil Neville, David Beckham, Paul Scholes and Nicky Butt, who would all go on to be important members of the team. And so the 1995–96 season began without a major signing for Manchester United, during a summer when Arsenal followed by Liverpool were breaking the British transfer record.

A youthful United team lost 3–1 in their opening league game of the 1995–96 season, against Aston Villa. On Match of the Day, pundit Alan Hansen criticised their performance, ending his analysis with the words, "You can't win anything with kids." United won their next five matches and were boosted by the return of Cantona, who made his comeback against Liverpool in a 2–2 draw at Old Trafford in October 1995. For much of the season, the team trailed league leaders Newcastle and found themselves ten points behind by Christmas; this later was narrowed to seven points after defeating them on 27 December 1995. The gap increased to 12 points, but a series of wins, coupled with Newcastle dropping points, meant by late March, United moved to the top of the table. In a televised outburst after his team's win against Leeds, Newcastle manager Kevin Keegan responded angrily to Ferguson's comments: "We're still fighting for this title, and he's got to go to Middlesbrough... I would love it if we beat them, love it." A win against Middlesbrough on the final day sealed the title for United and the team beat Liverpool by a goal to nil to win the 1996 FA Cup final; this was their second double in three years. A week after the cup final, Ferguson agreed a four-year contract to remain at United.

United started the following season thrashing the previous year's league runners-up Newcastle 4–0 in the Charity Shield. They went on to win their fourth league title in five seasons at the end of the 1996–97 campaign, made easier by the fact that their rivals were "not up to the job". Under Ferguson, the team made a better go in the Champions League and reached the semi-final stage for the first time in 28 years. United did not advance any further, after defeat by Borussia Dortmund of Germany. Norwegian signings Ole Gunnar Solskjær and Ronny Johnsen were the notable additions to the squad, with the former ending the season as the club's top goalscorer. In May 1997, Cantona informed Ferguson of his decision to retire from football. The player "felt exploited by United's merchandising department" and questioned the ambition of the club, reasons which Ferguson understood. Striker Teddy Sheringham was signed as Cantona's replacement from Tottenham Hotspur, with Blackburn defender Henning Berg the other significant purchase that summer. In the close season, United appointed Keane as their new captain. Ferguson described him as "the best all-round player in the game" after the team's 1997 FA Charity Shield win and believed Keane had "all the right ingredients" to succeed from Cantona.

Defeat by Leeds United in September 1997 was the team's first league loss in seven months; Keane during the match injured himself and was subsequently ruled out for the rest of the season with ligament damage. Goalkeeper Peter Schmeichel was placed as captain in his absence. By November, United opened up a four-point lead in the league, which prompted talk of whether any team could catch them. After Arsenal's defeat of United in the same month, Ferguson acknowledged a one-horse race was "not good for the game" and admitted his opponents "... deserved to win on their second-half performance". The fallibilities of Liverpool, Chelsea and Blackburn as league challengers allowed United during the winter to extend their lead by 11 points, albeit with Arsenal having games-in-hand. This was enough for Manchester bookmaker Fred Done to pay out on punters who backed the champions retaining their title.

Arsenal collected maximum points, sealing the title with a win against Everton on 3 May 1998. Ferguson congratulated his opponent Arsène Wenger, who in his first full season at the club, later completed the double: "I think it's good for my young players to lose on this occasion. I wholeheartedly acknowledge what Arsenal achieved between Christmas and the end of the season." United straight after paid £10.75 million for PSV defender Jaap Stam, a new club record fee. Ferguson wanted to strengthen the squad's attacking options and identified Aston Villa's Dwight Yorke as his main target. Attempts to sign Yorke were rebuffed at first, before Ferguson persuaded Manchester United chairman Martin Edwards to increase United's initial offer of £10 million. A £12.6 million deal was reached a week into the league campaign; Yorke signed minutes before the deadline to submit United's squad for the Champions League.

==== 1998–99: Treble success ====
United opened the 1998–99 season with a 3–0 loss to Arsenal in the 1998 FA Charity Shield. The beating did not concern Ferguson, though he described his team's defeat by Arsenal in September 1998 as "a lot less tolerable". In December 1998, Kidd left his role as assistant to become the manager of Blackburn Rovers. Ferguson instructed Eric Harrison and Les Kershaw to find suitable replacements, "in terms of coaching ability and work ethic." Both recommended Steve McClaren, the assistant to Jim Smith at Derby County. McClaren was Ferguson's initial choice and appointed him in February 1999. His first game as assistant was United's 8–1 victory over Nottingham Forest.

Ferguson felt United's bid to regain the Premier League began indifferently because of their commitments to other competitions. He was willing to "pay for the progress" made in the Champions League; the team finished second in their Champions League "group of death", behind Bayern Munich and ahead of Barcelona. United's win against Liverpool in the FA Cup fourth round was a portent for the remainder of the season. A goal down after three minutes, the team equalised in the 86th minute and scored the winning goal through Solskjær in stoppage time. On reflection, Ferguson said it was "a demonstration of the morale that was to be every bit as vital as rich skill in the five months that lay ahead of United".

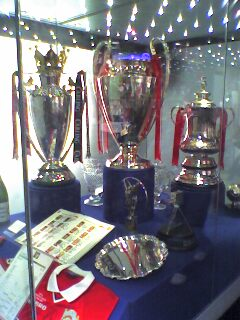
Under Ferguson, United acclaimed a treble of trophies in the 1998–99 season.

In the final weeks of the league season, Arsenal emerged as a credible challenger to United. Both clubs were also paired together in the semi-final of the FA Cup, decided by a replay as the original game finished goalless. Keane was sent off in the second half and United conceded a penalty late into the match with the score 1–1. Dennis Bergkamp's effort was saved by Peter Schmeichel. Ferguson hoped his team "could at least take it to a penalty shoot-out", but instead the match was settled in extra time: Giggs ran the length of the pitch and evaded several Arsenal players to score the winning goal. United went on to beat Newcastle United in the FA Cup final and completed the double – a week earlier the team had regained the Premiership title.

United's progression in the Champions League was promising compared to previous seasons. The team eliminated Inter Milan at the quarter-final stage and faced Juventus in the last four of the competition. A late goal scored by Giggs in the first leg earned the team a 1–1 draw, but in spite of conceding an away goal, Ferguson was adamant of United's chances of reaching the final: "... something tells me we are going to win. The nature of our club is that we torture ourselves so much that the only way to get relief is by winning over there." At the Stadio delle Alpi, striker Filippo Inzaghi scored twice to put Juventus 3–1 up on aggregate. Keane headed in a Beckham cross to halve the deficit just before half-time, but was later shown a yellow card for a foul on Edgar Davids, which prevented him from playing in the final. Yorke equalised, before Cole added a third to win the match outright. Keane's performance merited praise from Ferguson:

It was the most emphatic display of selflessness I have seen on a football field. Pounding over every blade of grass, competing if he would rather die of exhaustion than lose, he inspired all around him. I felt it was an honour to be associated with such a player.

Days after the FA Cup final, United travelled to Barcelona, the setting for the UEFA Champions League final. Ferguson contemplated his team selection against Bayern Munich; suspensions to Scholes and Keane ruled both players out of the match. Beckham was positioned in centre midfield, while Giggs moved to the right wing and Jesper Blomqvist started on the left – changes the manager felt would prevent the opposition from playing narrow. United conceded in the first six minutes of the final, from a Mario Basler's free kick. Sheringham, who came on for Blomqvist, equalised from a corner in the first minute of additional time. McClaren told Ferguson to get the team organised for extra time, to which he replied, "Steve, this game isn't finished." Three minutes into added time, Solskjær scored the winner, which for United completed an unprecedented treble. Ferguson, interviewed moments after, said, "I can't believe it. Football, bloody hell. But they never gave in and that's what won it." He and Schmeichel, the stand-in captain, jointly lifted the cup during the trophy presentation.

A crowd of over 500,000 people turned out on the streets of Manchester to greet the players, who paraded through the city in an open-top bus. As European champions, United were invited to play in the Intercontinental Cup. The club also entered the inaugural Club World Championship, which was held in Brazil. This brought about a potential fixture congestion so United accepted the FA's recommendation of withdrawing from the FA Cup, the first holders to do so. In later years, Ferguson elaborated on the club's decision: "We did it to help England's World Cup bid. That was the political situation. I regretted it because we got nothing but stick and terrible criticism for not being in the FA Cup when really, it wasn't our fault."

==== 1999–2002: Title hat-trick, retirement plan ====
Schmeichel's decision to leave United after eight seasons prompted Ferguson to bring in replacements: Mark Bosnich from Aston Villa and Italian Massimo Taibi. The latter featured in four matches, the last of which a 5–0 defeat at Chelsea in October 1999; he was not selected again by Ferguson. United ended the 1999–2000 league season as champions, with just three defeats and a record points margin of 18. In December 1999, the club beat Palmeiras in Tokyo to win the Intercontinental Cup, but a month later exited at the group stage of the inaugural Club World Championship, although Ferguson stated the tournament was "fantastic". United failed to retain the Champions League, as they lost in the quarter-final stage to eventual winners Real Madrid. Ferguson sought to strengthen his squad and signed Fabien Barthez from Monaco for £7.8 million. He also monitored the progress of Ruud van Nistelrooy, "a striker of the highest calibre". He met the player and his agent in Manchester to discuss formalities and was informed of Van Nistelrooy's troubled right knee. Ferguson was not agitated by this; he recalled from experience a similar niggle that did not stop his playing career. Van Nistelrooy, however, failed his medical, but Ferguson reassured him that "we might yet find a way out of the nightmare". The deal was resurrected in April 2001 for a British record transfer fee of £19 million.

In the 2000–01 season, United retained the league title for a third season, becoming only the fourth side in history to do so. The achievement was overshadowed by reports of a rift between the club's board and Ferguson. He told the club's television channel MUTV that he was prepared to sever all ties with the club, once his contract ended the following year: "The decision has been taken. I'm going to leave the club. I'm disappointed with what has happened because I was hoping something would be sorted out. It hasn't happened as I thought it would and that's all there is to it." Both parties eventually reached a compromise which pleased Ferguson: "I am delighted we've settled this. When you have been at the club as long as I have it gets in your blood." Age was one of the factors in Ferguson's decision to retire: reaching 60 acted as a "psychological barrier ... It changed my sense of my own fitness, my health."

In May 2001, McClaren left to become Middlesbrough manager, with Jimmy Ryan being named assistant to Ferguson for the duration of the campaign. United once more broke their transfer record with the purchase of Juan Sebastián Verón from Lazio for a reported £28.1 million. In August 2001, Stam was transferred to Lazio for £16 million. The player reportedly moved because of claims in his autobiography Head to Head; Stam implied that Ferguson illegally contacted him about a move to Manchester United, before informing PSV. Ferguson said he sold the player because the club needed to cut back on its "massive wage bill". He replaced the defender with Laurent Blanc, a long sought-after target. In an interview with Alastair Campbell eight years after, Ferguson described his biggest mistake at the club was "letting go of Jaap Stam. No question".

The club endured a poor first half to the season and languished in ninth position after a home defeat by West Ham in December 2001. On the night of Christmas Day, Ferguson shelved his retirement plan. His family convinced him to remain in charge of United and Ferguson informed Watkins of his u-turn the following day. He publicised his decision to remain in February 2002. The team won 13 out of the next 15 matches, though finished third in the league behind Arsenal and Liverpool. United were unsuccessful in Europe, losing their Champions League semi-final on away goals to Bayer Leverkusen. Early exits from the League Cup and FA Cup meant they ended the season trophyless. Ferguson himself said that the decision to announce his retirement had resulted in a negative effect on the players and on his ability to impose discipline.

==== 2002–2006: Rebuilding and transition ====
In June 2002, Ferguson appointed Carlos Queiroz as his new assistant. The recommendation came from Andy Roxburgh, at a time when United began scouting for southern-hemisphere footballers and wanted a multilingual coach. Ferguson was so impressed with Queiroz after their first meeting, he offered him the job "right away". In July 2002, United paid £29.3 million for Leeds United defender Rio Ferdinand. The club broke the British transfer record once more, though this did not concern Ferguson: "We have the right to try and improve ourselves and there's nothing wrong with that."

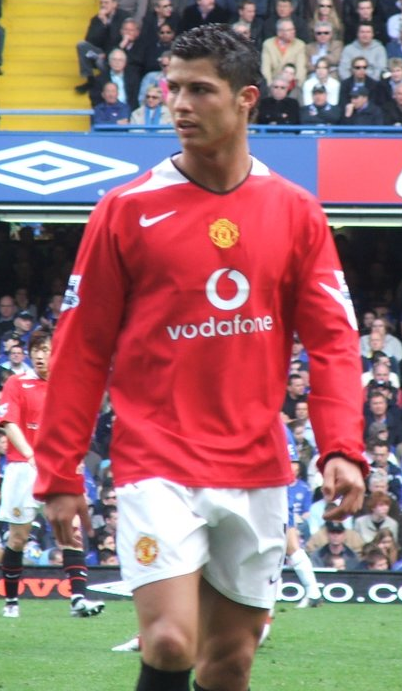
United signed Cristiano Ronaldo in August 2003.

The 2002–03 season began rather poorly for United; the club made their worst start to a league campaign in 13 years. In a column for The Daily Telegraph, Hansen said Ferguson "will recognise this difficult start to the season for what it is: the greatest challenge of his career". Ferguson's response was typically bullish:

I don't get paid to panic. We have had plenty of stuttering starts. My greatest challenge is not what's happening at the moment. My greatest challenge was knocking Liverpool right off their fucking perch. And you can print that.

Several players were sent away for surgery in this period, a "minor gamble" Ferguson took in the hope they would return energised. Defeats, such as the one to Manchester City at Maine Road in November 2002, forced United to change their playing style. The team "moved the ball forward more and quicker rather than concentrating on possession ratios", and the coaching staff tried accommodating Diego Forlán with Ruud van Nistelrooy, before settling with Paul Scholes. United's league form improved as the season went on despite defeat by Liverpool in the 2003 Football League Cup final and they overhauled Arsenal to win the Premier League for an eighth time in May 2003. The team were eliminated in the Champions League quarter-final to Real Madrid over two legs; the second match, United won 4–3 at Old Trafford with Real's Brazilian striker Ronaldo scoring a hat-trick.

After a season at United, Queiroz left to manage Real Madrid in June 2003. Ferguson anticipated his deputy would return – "Three months later, he was wanting to quit Madrid" – and for that reason did not appoint a replacement. In the summer, David Beckham also moved to Real Madrid, while Juan Sebastián Verón joined Chelsea. United in the meantime rebuilt their team: Tim Howard replaced Barthez in goal and Kléberson, Eric Djemba-Djemba and Cristiano Ronaldo came in to bolster the squad. Ronaldinho might have also joined "had he not said yes, then no, to our offer".

In December 2003, Rio Ferdinand was banned from playing football for eight months after he failed to present himself at a drugs test. Ferguson in his autobiography ten years later blamed the drug testers, who "...didn't do their job. They didn't go looking for Rio". The absence of Ferdinand hampered United's defence of the Premier League in the 2003–04 season; the team finished third behind Arsenal's "Invincibles" and Chelsea. In Europe, they experienced defeat at the hands of eventual winners Porto. Ferguson felt it was possible "not because of the performance of the players but because of the referee", who disallowed a legitimate Scholes goal that would have been enough to progress. United ended the campaign as FA Cup winners, beating Millwall 3–0 in the 2004 final.

At the beginning of the 2004–05 season, teenage striker Wayne Rooney (the world's most expensive teenager at more than £20 million) and Argentine defender Gabriel Heinze joined United while Cristiano Ronaldo continued where he had left off the previous season by putting in more match-winning performances. But the lack of a striker after Van Nistelrooy spent most of the season injured saw the club finish third for the third time in four seasons. In the 2004–05 FA Cup, they lost on penalties to Arsenal in the final. A second-round exit from the Champions League at the hands of Milan and a semi-final exit from the League Cup at the hands of eventual winners Chelsea (who also clinched the Premier League title) meant that 2004–05 was a rare instance of a trophyless season for United. During the season, Ferguson managed his 1,000th game in charge of United in a 2–1 home win against Lyon.

Ferguson's preparations for the 2005–06 season were disrupted by a high-profile dispute with major shareholder John Magnier, over the ownership of the racehorse Rock of Gibraltar. When Magnier and business partner J. P. McManus agreed to sell their shares to American business tycoon Malcolm Glazer, it cleared the way for Glazer to acquire full control of the club. This sparked violent protests from United fans, and disrupted Ferguson's plans to strengthen the team in the transfer market. In spite of this, United looked to solve their goalkeeping and midfield problems. For this, they signed the Dutch goalkeeper Edwin van der Sar from Fulham and Korean star Park Ji-sung from PSV.

The season was one of transition. On 18 November, Roy Keane officially left the club, his contract ended by mutual consent. United failed to qualify for the knock-out phase of the UEFA Champions League. In the January transfer window, Serbian defender Nemanja Vidić and French full-back Patrice Evra were signed, and the side finished in second place in the league, behind runaway winners Chelsea. Winning the League Cup was a consolation prize for lack of success elsewhere. Ruud van Nistelrooy's future at Old Trafford was in doubt after not starting in the League Cup final, and he departed at the end of the season.

Before the start of the new season, Ferguson received much criticism, particular in the guise of an article in The Guardian titled "Shredding his legacy at every turn".

==== Second Champions League trophy ====
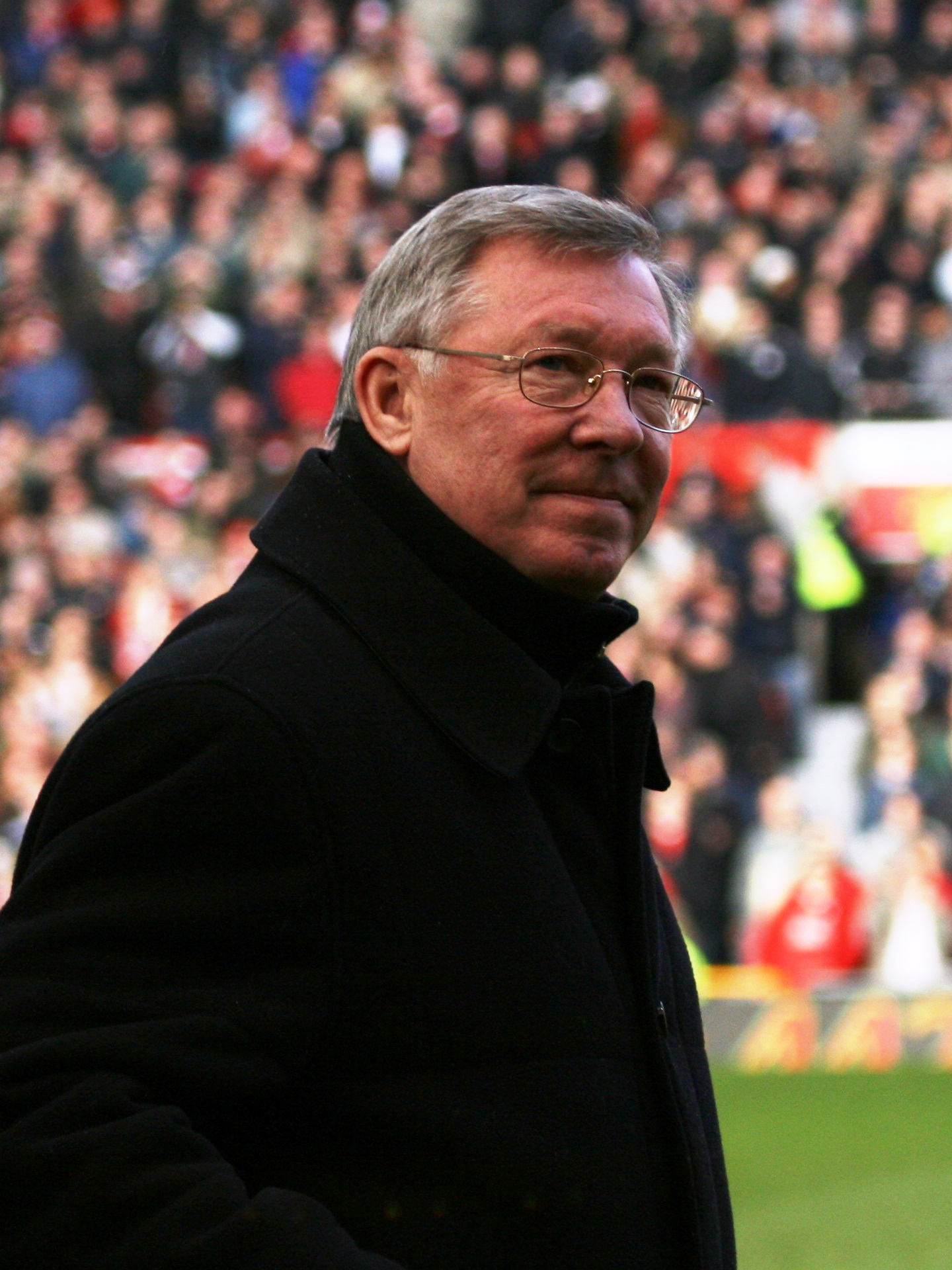
Ferguson in 2006

In 2006, Michael Carrick was signed to take Roy Keane's place in the team for a fee that eventually rose to £18 million. United started the season well, and for the first time ever won their first four Premier League games, United's best start since 1985. They set the early pace in the Premier League and never relinquished top spot from the tenth match of the 38-game season. The January 2006 signings had a huge impact on United's performances – Patrice Evra and Nemanja Vidić came in to form a solid back line along with Rio Ferdinand and skipper Gary Neville.

Ferguson celebrated the 20th anniversary of his appointment as manager of Manchester United on 6 November 2006. Tributes also came from Ferguson's players, both past and present, as well as his old foe, Arsène Wenger. The party was spoiled the following day when United endured a single-goal defeat at the hands of Southend United in the fourth round of the League Cup. On 1 December it was announced that Manchester United had signed 35-year-old Henrik Larsson on loan, a player that Ferguson had admired for many years, and attempted to capture previously. On 23 December 2006, Cristiano Ronaldo scored the club's 2,000th goal under Ferguson in a match against Aston Villa.

Manchester United subsequently won their ninth Premier League title but were denied a unique fourth double by Chelsea's Didier Drogba scoring a late goal in the FA Cup final at Wembley Stadium. In the Champions League, the club reached the semi-finals, recording a 7–1 home win over Roma in the quarter-final second leg, but lost at the San Siro to Milan 3–0 in the second leg of the semi-final after being 3–2 up from the first leg.

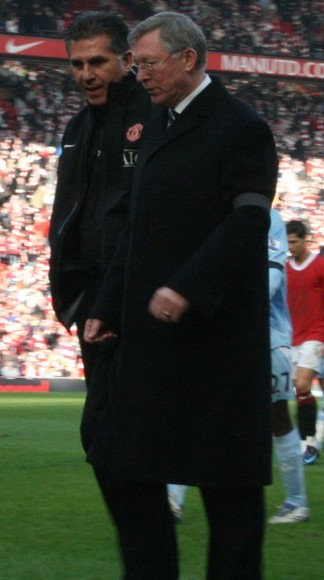
Ferguson in 2008, standing beside assistant manager Carlos Queiroz

For the 2007–08 season, Ferguson made notable signings to reinforce United's first team. Long-term target Owen Hargreaves joined from Bayern Munich, young Portuguese winger Nani and Brazilian playmaker Anderson joined soon after, while the last summer signing was West Ham and Argentina striker Carlos Tevez after a complex and protracted transfer saga.

Despite getting some retribution on Chelsea by beating them in the Community Shield, United suffered their worst start to a league season under Ferguson, drawing their first two league games before suffering a 1–0 defeat by local rivals Manchester City. United, however, recovered and began a tight race with Arsenal for the title. After a good run of form, Ferguson claimed that throughout his time at Manchester United, this was the best squad he had managed to assemble thus far.

On 16 February 2008, United beat Arsenal 4–0 in an FA Cup fifth round match at Old Trafford, but were knocked out by eventual winners Portsmouth in the quarter-final on 8 March, losing 1–0 at home. United having had a penalty claim turned down, Ferguson alleged after the game that Keith Hackett, general manager of the Professional Game Match Officials Board, was "not doing his job properly". Ferguson was subsequently charged by The FA with improper conduct, which he decided to contest. This was the second charge Ferguson faced in the season, following his complaints against the referee after United lost 1–0 at Bolton Wanderers – a charge he decided not to contest.

On 11 May 2008, Ferguson led Manchester United to a tenth Premier League title, exactly 25 years to the day after he led Aberdeen to European glory against Real Madrid in the Cup Winners' Cup. Nearest rivals Chelsea – level on points going into the final round of matches, but with an inferior goal difference – could only draw 1–1 at home to Bolton, finishing two points adrift of the champions. United's title win was sealed with a 2–0 win over Wigan Athletic, managed by former United captain Steve Bruce.

On 21 May 2008, Ferguson won his second European Cup with Manchester United as they beat Chelsea 6–5 on penalties in the Luzhniki Stadium in Moscow, following a 1–1 draw after extra time in the first ever all-English UEFA Champions League Final. A penalty miss from Cristiano Ronaldo meant that John Terry's spot-kick would have given the trophy to Chelsea if successfully converted, but Terry missed his penalty and in the end it was Edwin van der Sar's blocking of a Nicolas Anelka penalty which gave the trophy to Manchester United for the second time under Ferguson and for the third time overall.

==== World champions and further league titles ====
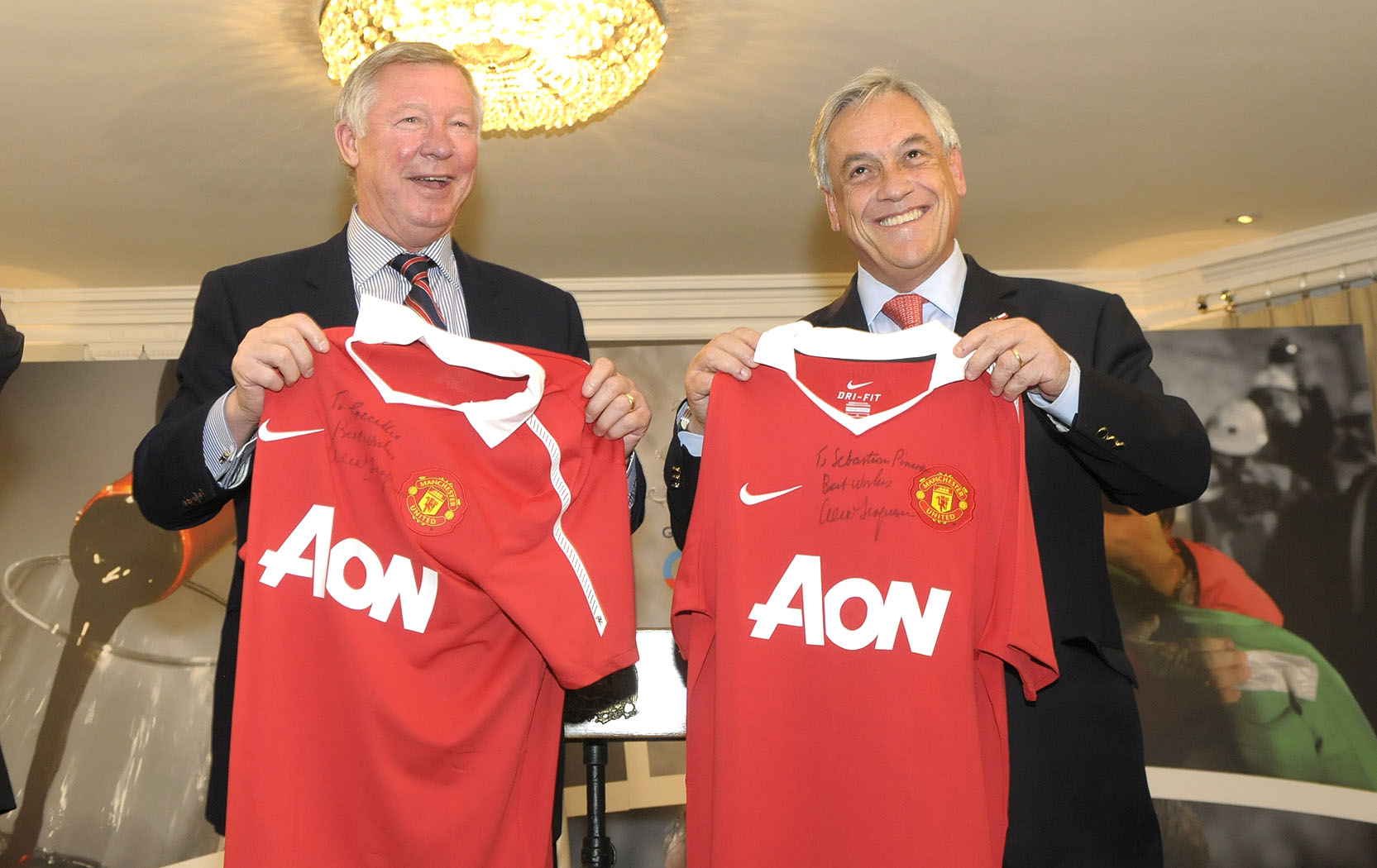
Ferguson with Chilean president Sebastian Piñera in 2010

Although the team had a slow start to the 2008–09 season, United won the Premier League, edging out challengers Liverpool with a game to spare, making Ferguson the first manager in the history of English football to win the top division three times consecutively, on two separate occasions. Ferguson had now won 11 league titles at Manchester United, and the 2008–09 season title success put them level with Liverpool as league champions on a record 18 occasions in total. They also won the League Cup on penalties after a goalless draw in the final against Tottenham, after becoming the first British club to win the FIFA Club World Cup in December 2008. They contested the Champions League final against Barcelona on 27 May 2009 but lost 2–0, thus failed to defend the trophy.

In 2009–10 season, Ferguson added another League Cup to his honours list as United defeated Aston Villa 2–1 in the final on 28 February 2010, United's first ever successful knockout cup defence. However, his dreams of a third European Cup were ended a few weeks later when United were edged out of the competition in the quarter-finals by Bayern Munich on away goals. And their hopes of a record 19th league title were ended on the last day of the season when Chelsea beat them to the Premier League title by one point, crushing Wigan Athletic 8–0 and rendering United's 4–0 win over Stoke City meaningless.

He ended the following season by winning his 12th and Manchester United's 19th league title and thus overtaking Liverpool's record of 18. Manchester United faced Barcelona again on 28 May 2011 in the 2011 Champions League final, their third in four years, but United lost 3–1. Analyst Alan Hansen stated that he believed Ferguson was "the key component" in United's success that season, so key in fact that "[he] would have claimed the crown with any of the other top sides had he been in charge of them". With Edwin van der Sar, Gary Neville and Paul Scholes all retiring in 2011, Ferguson spent big by signing defender Phil Jones from Blackburn and winger Ashley Young from Aston Villa for around £17 million each, and goalkeeper David de Gea from Atlético Madrid for around £19 million.

The following season United managed to beat rivals Manchester City in the 2011 FA Community Shield and eliminated them in the FA Cup third round, but ended the season below City, who won their first Premier League title on goal difference. This bitter and slim defeat prompted Ferguson to sign star-striker Robin van Persie, who was the Premier League Golden Boot title-holder, from another rival Arsenal on 17 August 2012.

The 2012–13 season saw Ferguson guide United to become league champions for the 20th time, claiming the title with a 3–0 home win over Aston Villa on 22 April 2013 with four matches to spare; Van Persie scored all the goals with a first half hat-trick en route to retain the Golden Boot. His final game in charge, his 1,500th in total, saw United play out a 5–5 draw with West Bromwich Albion. The result meant United finished the season 11 points ahead of runners-up Manchester City. Earlier in the season, on 2 September 2012, Ferguson managed his 1,000th league game with United playing against Southampton. United won the game 3–2 thanks to another hat-trick from Van Persie. Two weeks later, he won his 100th game in the Champions League with a 1–0 win over Galatasaray at Old Trafford.

==== Retirement ====
On 8 May 2013, Ferguson announced that he had decided to retire as manager at the end of the football season, but would remain at the club as a director and club ambassador. The Guardian announced it was the "end of an era", while UEFA president Michel Platini referred to Ferguson as "a true visionary". Former Manchester United players Paul Ince and Bryan Robson agreed that Ferguson would be "a hard act to follow". Manchester United co-chairman Joel Glazer said, "His determination to succeed and dedication to the club have been truly remarkable." Ferguson revealed that he had in fact decided that he was going to retire back in December 2012 and that it had been very difficult not to reveal his plans. Ferguson's announcement of his decision to retire saw United's shares fall 5% on the New York Stock Exchange.

On 9 May 2013, Manchester United announced Everton manager David Moyes would replace Ferguson as the club manager from 1 July, having signed a six-year contract. In Ferguson's final match in charge, Manchester United drew 5–5 at West Bromwich Albion, a hat-trick from Romelu Lukaku, later a United player, denying Ferguson a final victory.

Ferguson released his second autobiography in October 2013 called My Autobiography. In January 2014, Ferguson was appointed as the UEFA Coaching Ambassador, and said it was "an honour and a privilege" to be given the role. In April 2014, it was announced that Ferguson would be taking up a "long-term teaching position" at Harvard University, where he would be lecturing on a new course titled "The Business of Entertainment, Media and Sports". This came six months after he revealed his blueprint for success was included in the Harvard Business Review in a series of interviews with Anita Elberse. His book, Leading: Learning from Life and My Years at Manchester United, was published in collaboration with billionaire venture capitalist, author and former journalist Michael Moritz in August 2015.

== Managerial profile ==
Ferguson's responsibilities at Manchester United extended beyond those of a conventional head coach, encompassing much of the club's football operations, including long-term squad planning and youth development. Sports management academic Dan Parnell likened his role to that of a sporting director, overseeing specialist coaches and support staff while setting the club's broader footballing direction. Ferguson increasingly delegated the running of training sessions to his assistants, allowing him to concentrate on observing players and overseeing the team's broader development.

=== Tactical approach ===
"Think forward, look forward, play forward"

— One of Sir Alex Ferguson's "golden rules" of possession, as recalled by René Meulensteen, former Manchester United first-team coach

Ferguson's tactical approach evolved considerably throughout his managerial career. Although he favoured attacking football, he also emphasised defensive organisation, adapting his teams' approach to different opponents and match situations, from aggressive high pressing to compact defending and counter-attacking. Rather than adhering to a fixed system, he continually adjusted formations and player roles in response to developments in the game. His encounters with leading European clubs and the contributions of successive assistant managers also influenced the evolution of his tactical approach. Former first-team coach René Meulensteen described Ferguson as "very, very flexible and open-minded", recalling his emphasis on attacking with pace, power, penetration and unpredictability. Ole Gunnar Solskjær likewise recalled the importance of work rate under Ferguson, stating that regardless of individual talent, players were expected to run more than their opponents.

While Ferguson continually adapted his tactical approach to changing circumstances, counter-attacking football remained a recurring feature of his Manchester United teams across successive generations, particularly during the 1990s and late 2000s. Characterised by rapid transitions from defence to attack, pace on the wings and coordinated forward movement, United's counter-attacking play was widely praised for its speed and effectiveness. Ferguson himself emphasised its importance, stating in 2010 that "the counter-attack has always been a part of our game, particularly away from home". Meulensteen recalled Ferguson's emphasis on forward movement and exploiting space behind opposing defences, with attacking players encouraged to make runs whenever teammates had time and space on the ball. Wayne Rooney similarly recalled that United often deliberately drew opponents forward before launching rapid counter-attacks, particularly against Arsenal, describing the approach as more calculated than an exclusively attacking style of play.

During his time at Aberdeen in the early 1980s, Ferguson employed a flexible 4–4–2 formation, characterised by asymmetrical positioning and varied attacking roles. In the 1983 European Cup Winners' Cup final against Real Madrid, Gordon Strachan moved infield from the right of midfield, while Peter Weir provided width and attacking movement on the left. Eric Black operated behind Mark McGhee, allowing the formation to shift towards a 4–4–1–1 in possession. Aberdeen also employed an organised defensive structure, combining pressing with counter-attacking opportunities. Against Hamburg in the 1983 European Super Cup, Ferguson deployed his forwards to disrupt the opposition's build-up play while reinforcing central midfield to restrict Felix Magath, seeking to exploit space on the counter-attack.

During the 1990s, his Manchester United teams generally employed variations of the 4–4–2 formation, often resembling a 4–4–1–1 when one forward dropped deeper. Following Eric Cantona's arrival in 1992, Ferguson deployed him in a withdrawn role behind Mark Hughes, allowing him to operate between the lines and link midfield with attack. Football analysts have credited Cantona with helping to popularise the creative number 10 role in English football, citing Dennis Bergkamp at Arsenal and Gianfranco Zola at Chelsea as later examples. His sides emphasised attacking width, a high tempo and rapid counter-attacks, with the pace of Ryan Giggs, Lee Sharpe and Andrei Kanchelskis contributing to United's early Premier League success. The 1998–99 treble-winning side retained a similar approach, with David Beckham and Giggs providing width behind the strike partnership of Dwight Yorke and Andy Cole.

Following United's elimination by Real Madrid in the 1999–2000 UEFA Champions League, Ferguson adopted a more cautious approach in European competition, seeking greater midfield control and defensive protection against counter-attacks. The signing of Juan Sebastián Verón in 2001 marked an early attempt to reshape the midfield, while subsequent seasons saw experimentation with 4–4–1–1, 4–2–3–1 and 4–3–3 formations. These adjustments initially produced mixed results, with some critics questioning whether the changes had disrupted United's previously successful attacking approach.

By the late 2000s, Ferguson had developed a more fluid attacking system, particularly through the movement and positional interchange of Cristiano Ronaldo, Wayne Rooney and Carlos Tevez. During the 2007–08 season, United employed variations of 4–2–3–1 and 4–3–3, combining greater tactical flexibility with rapid transitions and counter-attacking play. UEFA's technical report highlighted the team's attacking width, quick counter-attacks and combination play in advanced areas. Ferguson nevertheless continued to adjust his formations according to the opposition rather than abandoning the 4–4–2 entirely. United's defensive organisation was also notable, with the team setting a Premier League record of 14 consecutive clean sheets during the 2008–09 season, anchored by goalkeeper Edwin van der Sar and the central defensive partnership of Rio Ferdinand and Nemanja Vidić.

Following Cristiano Ronaldo's departure in 2009, Ferguson reshaped United's attack, moving Wayne Rooney into a more central role and seeking to distribute goalscoring responsibility across the team. This transition coincided with scrutiny of United's relatively restrained transfer spending amid the club's substantial debts, although Ferguson maintained that funds were available and cited difficulties in identifying suitable signings. United subsequently returned to variations of 4–4–1–1 and 4–2–3–1, with Javier Hernández and later Robin van Persie operating as central forwards. Injuries and changes in personnel complicated Ferguson's efforts to establish a balanced central midfield. During the 2012–13 season, United's traditional reliance on wing play was affected by disappointing performances from Antonio Valencia, Nani and Ashley Young. Ferguson experimented with a midfield diamond, seeking greater control through central areas and tactical unpredictability while retaining the option of using traditional wide formations.

=== Man-management and discipline ===
Ferguson was renowned for his leadership, ability to motivate players, and emphasis on discipline. In his team talks, he sought to reinforce players' confidence, expectations, and trust in one another, sometimes using stories and analogies to convey his message. At half-time, he adapted his approach to the team's performance, focusing on maintaining concentration when winning and addressing problems when losing. His methods ranged from encouragement to direct criticism, depending on the circumstances.

His confrontational approach was exemplified by the "hairdryer treatment", a term widely credited to former Manchester United forward Mark Hughes. Hughes described Ferguson standing "nose-to-nose" with players and shouting so forcefully that their hair appeared to be blown backwards. Neville nevertheless noted that such incidents were less frequent than Ferguson's reputation suggested. Ferguson maintained that his approach was not based solely on intimidation, emphasising the importance of encouragement and adapting his methods to individual players. In interviews with researchers at Harvard Business School, he explained that he preferred to address mistakes immediately after matches rather than prolong criticism, while acknowledging that he had become less confrontational with age. In 2016, he disputed the extent of his reputation for the hairdryer treatment, claiming that such confrontations had occurred only occasionally and denying that he had governed his players through fear.

"Everyone would call him [Ferguson] because they want to be his mate… He knew everything; it was like the Mafia."

"I thought, well he's the mafia. Everyone's telling him where I've been, what I've drunk and how much I've paid for stuff. It was unbelievable."

— Rio Ferdinand, former Manchester United defender, on Ferguson's network of informants in Manchester.

Ferguson's involvement with players extended beyond their performances on the pitch, particularly during their development. Paul Scholes recalled that Ferguson regularly attended youth-team training sessions and maintained contact with players' parents, while Ryan Giggs described him as a mentor who offered support with personal difficulties. His supervision also extended to players' private lives. In 1986, shortly after taking charge of Manchester United, Ferguson and his assistant Archie Knox confronted Bryan Robson and Norman Whiteside at a nightclub in Bahrain after being alerted by club chairman Martin Edwards. According to Whiteside, Ferguson then made the pair walk three miles back to their hotel. Giggs similarly recalled that Ferguson would confront him with details of his nights out, an approach he initially found intrusive but later recognised as part of the manager's emphasis on professionalism. David Beckham also recalled that Ferguson ordered him to shave off his mohawk shortly before the 2000 FA Charity Shield, believing that the hairstyle was inconsistent with the club's professional image. Ferguson also sought to shield emerging talents such as Giggs and Cristiano Ronaldo from excessive media attention. His approach could also be compassionate; Ronaldo recalled being granted leave during the season to visit his seriously ill father and described Ferguson as a father figure in his football career. Phil Neville recalled being invited to Ferguson's home in 2005 to discuss his future away from Manchester United. Rather than conducting a formal meeting, Ferguson offered personal guidance over tea, an experience Neville likened to seeking advice from his parents.

Despite his reputation for strict discipline, Ferguson was also known for adapting his management approach to individual players. Wayne Rooney recalled that he and Ryan Giggs were frequently subjected to Ferguson's verbal reprimands because the manager knew they would respond by improving their performances. Giggs also stated that Ferguson rarely directed such criticism at Eric Cantona, Bryan Robson, Roy Keane or Cristiano Ronaldo, believing that their ability to influence matches warranted a different approach. Rooney also recalled an occasion when Ferguson reprimanded him for excessive dribbling, although he believed the criticism was actually intended for Ronaldo and Nani. Rooney suggested that Ferguson deliberately singled him out because he knew he would respond positively to confrontation, whereas Ronaldo might not have reacted as well. Ashley Young also recalled that he and Darren Fletcher were spared Ferguson's "hairdryer treatment" during his time at the club, explaining that he responded better to encouragement than to verbal reprimands. Keane recalled that Ferguson occasionally overlooked minor breaches of club rules by Cantona, such as wearing trainers with the team's formal suit, which might have resulted in fines for other players. Ferguson also made allowances for Robson despite his efforts to curb the club's drinking culture, as the captain was considered too valuable to lose and reportedly trained particularly hard after nights of heavy drinking.

"Alex ... would just say, 'get rid of them'."

— Tony Blair, former Prime Minister of the United Kingdom, recalling Ferguson's advice during a hypothetical discussion about managing talented but difficult individuals.

Ferguson placed considerable importance on maintaining his authority over the dressing room, even when this meant parting with influential players. His approach was reflected in the departures of Jaap Stam in 2001, David Beckham in 2003, (Note: For details of Ferguson's dispute with Beckham, see Controversies § David Beckham.) Roy Keane in 2005 and Ruud van Nistelrooy in 2006, amid differing tensions and disagreements with the manager. However, Ferguson later acknowledged that selling Stam had been a mistake, while Van Nistelrooy subsequently reconciled with him. Beckham later stated that he held no grudge against Ferguson, whom he continued to regard as a father figure, and acknowledged in 2017 that some of his own decisions had contributed to their strained relationship. Keane also acknowledged in 2019 that Ferguson "was a brilliant manager and very good to me", while describing their relationship as strictly professional.

=== Mind games ===
Ferguson was known for his use of psychological tactics, commonly referred to as "mind games", to exert pressure on rival managers. His public remarks and media interviews became a means of unsettling opponents during title races, notably Kevin Keegan during Newcastle United's 1995–96 title challenge and Rafael Benítez during Liverpool's 2008–09 campaign.

During the 2008–09 Premier League, with Liverpool leading the table, Ferguson questioned whether the club would become nervous as the title race progressed. On 9 January 2009, Benítez responded with a prepared list of what he called "facts", accusing Ferguson of receiving preferential treatment from football authorities and exerting undue influence over referees. Daniel Taylor of The Guardian interpreted the incident as an example of Ferguson's ability to unsettle rival managers through seemingly minor public remarks. In his 2015 autobiography My Story, Liverpool captain Steven Gerrard described Benítez's outburst as a "disaster" and questioned his decision to confront Ferguson, whom he regarded as a master of mind games. Gerrard also recalled being told by Manchester United players that Ferguson had laughed at the incident, saying, "I've got him. I've got him." Although the incident became associated with Liverpool's failure to win the league title that season, Benítez denied that his remarks had affected the team's performances, while later analysis suggested that attributing the outcome to the confrontation alone was overly simplistic.

Ferguson also used his dealings with the media to shield his own players from criticism, often diverting attention towards refereeing decisions or confrontations with journalists while addressing disciplinary matters privately. Former United striker Andy Cole wrote in 2013 that Ferguson's public criticism of referees could shift media attention away from poor performances or misconduct by his players. Cole recalled an incident in which Ferguson publicly criticised referee Andy D'Urso after United players had confronted him, while privately reprimanding his players for their behaviour. Journalist James Lawton similarly described Ferguson's confrontations with the press as a recurring means of defending his players, citing his handling of controversies involving Eric Cantona, Rio Ferdinand and Ryan Giggs.

Ferguson also employed psychological tactics from the touchline, notably by pointing to his watch during the closing stages of matches. In an interview on BT Sport's Clare Balding Meets, he admitted that he sometimes did not know how much time remained, describing the gesture as a deliberate ploy to unsettle opponents and influence referees. He referred to the practice as "a little trick", which became closely associated with the phenomenon known as "Fergie Time". The phenomenon also became a subject of controversy over allegations of preferential stoppage time for United. (Note: For discussion of the controversy and statistical analyses of stoppage time, see Controversies § Referees, under Fergie Time.)

=== Managerial reputation ===
"For me, he's the boss. I call him the boss because he's the boss of the coaches."

— José Mourinho, then manager of Real Madrid, in an interview with CNN in 2012

Ferguson is widely regarded as one of the greatest football managers of all time. In 2013, World Soccer ranked Ferguson as the greatest manager in football history following a poll of experts. In 2016, UEFA featured Ferguson among ten coaches recognised for their major impact on football since the organisation's foundation in 1954, describing him as "United's master tactician". In its profile of Ferguson, UEFA attributed his longevity and success to his ability to adapt to changes in football and his judgement in deciding when to change personnel. Football journalist Jonathan Wilson described Ferguson as "as adept at evolving tactically as any manager in history". Football analyst Michael Cox similarly considered Ferguson ahead of his time in English football in his willingness to change tactical systems, while noting that he was not always a tactical revolutionary. Carlo Ancelotti praised Ferguson's understanding of football, noting that although he delegated much of the training to his staff, "he understands football like few do". Following Ferguson's retirement announcement in 2013, Giovanni Trapattoni attributed his achievements to "his expert knowledge of the game and his capacity for planning that enabled him to rebuild and renew his Manchester United side countless times". Pep Guardiola similarly praised Ferguson's ability to sustain success across successive generations of players, admiring his capacity to continually rebuild his team and begin new cycles of achievement. Mauricio Pochettino compared Ferguson to a Larousse encyclopaedia, recalling how he had treasured a copy given to him by his parents at Christmas as a book in which he could find everything. Describing Ferguson as "an encyclopaedia of football", Pochettino also regarded him as an inspiration. José Mourinho, who had referred to Ferguson as "the manager's boss" as early as 2005, reiterated his admiration in 2026, describing him as "the boss of every coach" on the 40th anniversary of his appointment at Manchester United.

Anita Elberse, the Lincoln Filene Professor of Business Administration at Harvard Business School, attributed Ferguson's sustained success to his commitment to youth development, ability to adapt to changes in football, and skill in motivating and managing players. A Harvard Business School case study examining his leadership also highlighted his ability to establish a culture of success and commitment throughout the organisation, extending beyond the first-team players to other club staff. Ferguson's unusually broad managerial responsibilities were also recognised as a distinguishing aspect of his career. Following his retirement in 2013, former Manchester United chief executive David Gill highlighted the importance of managers who were involved in all aspects of the club, from youth development to the first team, while acknowledging the limited pool of candidates capable of fulfilling such a role. In 2015, Financial Times editor Lionel Barber described Ferguson's approach to managing United as an entire club rather than merely a football team as an achievement that might not be matched by another football manager.

Despite overseeing Manchester United's most successful era, Ferguson's highly centralised management approach later attracted scrutiny over its long-term sustainability, particularly following the club's difficulties after his retirement in 2013. In 2018, BBC Sport journalist Simon Stone argued that Ferguson's success had masked structural weaknesses at Manchester United, leaving the club ill-equipped to operate at the highest level after his departure. Grimsby Town co-owner Jason Stockwood argued that Ferguson's centralised authority had contributed both to United's success and to its difficulties after his retirement, while London Business School academic Richard Hytner cautioned against adopting a similar approach in business without checks and balances on executive authority.

== Controversies ==
=== Gordon Strachan ===
Gordon Strachan was a key player for Ferguson at Aberdeen, but Ferguson claimed that their relationship broke down when Strachan signed an agreement with German club FC Köln without telling Ferguson. Ferguson said that he believed although "there was a cunning streak in Strachan, I had never imagined that he could pull such a stroke on me". Strachan, while admitting that he had not handled the transfer in the best way, defended the move since he was increasingly disenchanted with Ferguson's coaching, saying "I needed him to treat me as an adult, not a kid; to have some respect for the fact that I was an experienced professional to whom abuse from the manager had become more of a motivational turn-off than a stimulus".

Strachan did not sign for Köln, but instead moved to Manchester United in the summer of 1984. Strachan said that he "loved playing for Ron Atkinson at United. After being beaten with a big stick for so long at Aberdeen, it was refreshing to have a manager who trusted and appreciated me, and treated me as an adult. When Fergie moved to United, I had to endure the big stick again". With Ferguson having joined Manchester United in November 1986, he thought that Strachan did not play for United with the same confidence he had in Scotland and subsequently sold him to Leeds United in 1989. Strachan enjoyed significant success with Leeds as a veteran player, helping them win the 1991–92 English league championship in a title race with Ferguson's United.

Their relationship continued to be frosty as Strachan moved into management himself. In his 1999 autobiography, Ferguson stated that Strachan "could not be trusted an inch – I would not want to expose my back to him in a hurry". Strachan's reaction to the attack, in his own autobiography, My Life in Football, was one of being "surprised and disappointed", although he suspected that Ferguson had helped to relegate Strachan's Coventry City in 2001 by fielding a weakened Manchester United team in a match against Derby County. By 2006 they appeared to have "declared something of a truce", ahead of Champions League matches between United and Strachan's Celtic.

=== David Beckham ===
Ferguson initially enjoyed a close relationship with David Beckham, who regarded him as a father figure and credited him with supporting him through the criticism he faced following his dismissal at the 1998 FIFA World Cup. However, their relationship deteriorated in the early 2000s, as Ferguson became increasingly concerned about Beckham's celebrity status and commitments outside football, which he believed were affecting the player's priorities.

In February 2003, following United's 2–0 FA Cup defeat to Arsenal, Ferguson was involved in a heated dressing-room argument with Beckham. Ferguson kicked a football boot in frustration, which struck Beckham above the eye and caused a minor injury. According to Beckham, Ferguson apologised to him privately after the incident. Ferguson later stated in his 2013 autobiography that he had decided Beckham should leave the club following their confrontation. Beckham transferred to Real Madrid at the end of the season.

=== Champions League draw fixing ===
On 5 April 2003, Ferguson claimed that the Champions League draw was fixed in favour of Spanish and Italian teams. UEFA charged Ferguson for bringing the game into disrepute with his comments. Ferguson apologised for his remarks and wrote a letter to UEFA in explanation, but he was fined 10,000 Swiss francs (£4,600) by the governing body.

=== Rock of Gibraltar ===
In 2003, Ferguson launched legal action against the then major Manchester United shareholder John Magnier over stud rights for race horse Rock of Gibraltar. Magnier counter-sued Ferguson by filing a "Motion to Comply" requiring Ferguson to substantiate his claim for half of Rock of Gibraltar's stud fees. The legal issues were further compounded by Magnier being a significant shareholder in the football club managed by Ferguson at the time. Magnier requested that "99 Questions" be answered over Ferguson's transfer dealings, including those of Jaap Stam, Juan Sebastián Verón, Tim Howard, David Bellion, Cristiano Ronaldo and Kléberson. The case was eventually settled out of court.

=== BBC ===
Ferguson refused to give interviews to the BBC after a documentary called Fergie and Son was shown on BBC Three on 27 May 2004. According to an article in The Independent, the documentary had "portrayed his agent son, Jason, as somebody who exploited his father's influence and position to his own ends in the transfer market". The same newspaper article made it clear that Jason was never found guilty of any wrongdoing, and it quoted Alex Ferguson as saying:

They [the BBC] did a story about my son that was whole lot of nonsense. It all [sic] made-up stuff and 'brown paper bags' and all that kind of carry-on. It was a horrible attack on my son's honour and he should never have been accused of that.

Subsequent interviews on BBC programmes such as Match of the Day were done by his assistants, latterly Mike Phelan. Under new Premier League rules intended for the 2010–11 season, Ferguson was required to end his BBC boycott. However, he refused to end his boycott and Manchester United said they would pay the resulting fines. No fines were ever issued, as the BBC hoped to resolve the dispute. On 25 August 2011, Ferguson met with BBC director general Mark Thompson and BBC North director Peter Salmon, after which Ferguson agreed to end his seven-year boycott.

=== Referees ===
Ferguson has received numerous punishments for abusing and publicly criticising match officials when he has perceived them to be at fault:

- 20 October 2003 – Two-match touchline ban and fined £10,000 after using abusive and/or insulting words towards fourth official Jeff Winter.
- 14 December 2007 – Two-match touchline ban and fined £5,000 after using abusive and/or insulting words towards Mark Clattenburg.
- 18 November 2008 – Two-match touchline ban and fined £10,000 after confronting Mike Dean after a game.
- 12 November 2009 – Four-match touchline ban (two suspended) and fined £20,000 for comments made about the fitness of Alan Wiley.
- 16 March 2011 – Five-match touchline ban (three plus the two suspended for the above offence) and fined £30,000 for comments made questioning the performance and fairness of Martin Atkinson.

==== "Fergie Time" ====
It has also been suggested that Ferguson's intimidation of referees resulted in so-called "Fergie Time": that is, unusually generous injury time being added in matches where Manchester United were behind. The phrase is at least as old as 1998, but the concept first appeared on 10 April 1993 when Steve Bruce scored a 97th-minute goal (seventh minute of injury time added on by the referee) against Sheffield Wednesday to win the game for United: they went top of the league with this win and remained there until the season ended. The term got wider coverage when United came from behind to win the 1999 UEFA Champions League final with two goals in injury time.

The concept cropped up in the media (and by opponents) whenever games seemed to be having more injury time than expected. A statistical analysis by The Times suggests that this concept might be valid, though the article points out that other footballing criteria may explain the correlation between extra added time and United being behind. Analysis by Opta Sports of Premier League matches played between 2010 and 2012 found on average that 79 seconds more time was played in matches where Manchester United were losing. This was a greater figure than for other top clubs, although most of these clubs seem to benefit from a "Fergie Time" effect, particularly in their home matches.

== Legacy ==
Many of Ferguson's former players have gone on to become football managers themselves, including Tony Fitzpatrick, Alex McLeish, Gordon Strachan, Mark McGhee, Willie Miller, Neale Cooper, Bryan Gunn, Eric Black, Billy Stark, Bryan Robson, Steve Bruce, Mark Hughes, Roy Keane, Paul Ince, Chris Casper, Mark Robins, Darren Ferguson, Ole Gunnar Solskjær, Henning Berg, Andrei Kanchelskis, Michael Appleton, Ryan Giggs, David Healy, Gabriel Heinze, Paul Scholes, Gary Neville, Jaap Stam, Michael Carrick, Wayne Rooney, Ruud van Nistelrooy, Darren Fletcher and Phil Neville. Five of these have subsequently managed Manchester United: Giggs (interim player-manager in 2014), Solskjær (2018 to 2021), Carrick (interim manager in 2021 and permanent in 2026), Van Nistelrooy (interim manager in 2024) and Fletcher (interim manager in 2026).

The phrase "squeaky-bum time", coined by Ferguson in reference to the tense final stages of a league competition, was included in the Collins English Dictionary and the Oxford English Dictionary.

A bronze statue of Ferguson, designed by Scottish sculptor Philip Jackson, was unveiled outside Old Trafford on 23 November 2012. On 14 October 2013, Ferguson attended a ceremony where a road near Old Trafford was renamed from Water's Reach to Sir Alex Ferguson Way. In July 2021, Aberdeen commissioned sculptor Andy Edwards to sculpt a bronze statue of Ferguson. This was unveiled at Aberdeen's Pittodrie stadium on 25 February 2022, and on the following day Ferguson was presented with a maquette of the statue.

A documentary about Ferguson's career titled Sir Alex Ferguson: Never Give In was released in UK cinemas on 27 May 2021 and was made available on Amazon Prime Video in the UK and Ireland on 29 May. It includes interviews from Ferguson himself, his family, doctors and former players who he managed throughout his career. Ferguson also inspired author Jilly Cooper to write a novel, Tackle!, based on football.

Statues of Sir Alex Ferguson

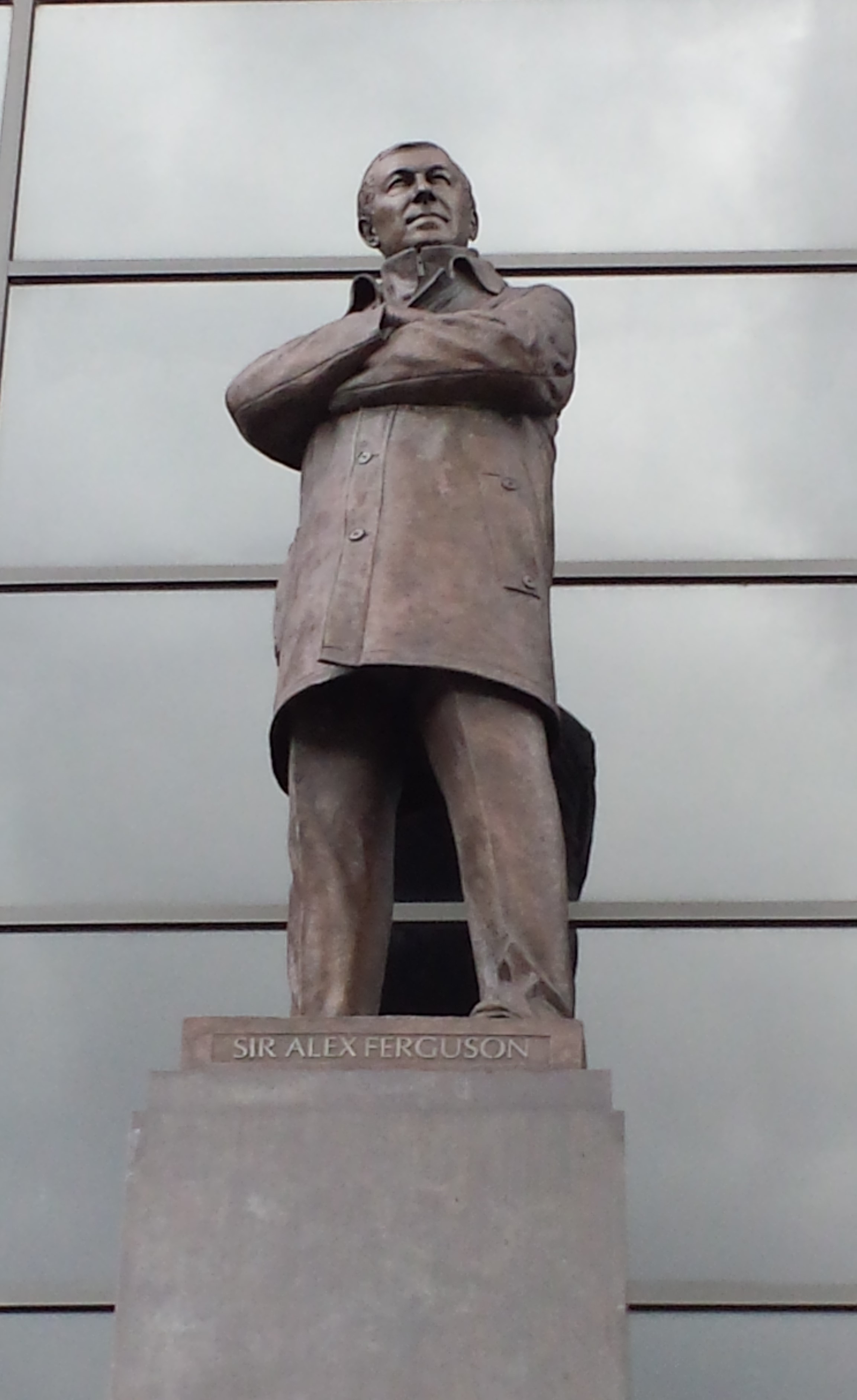
Sir Alex Ferguson statue installed at Old Trafford on 23 November 2012

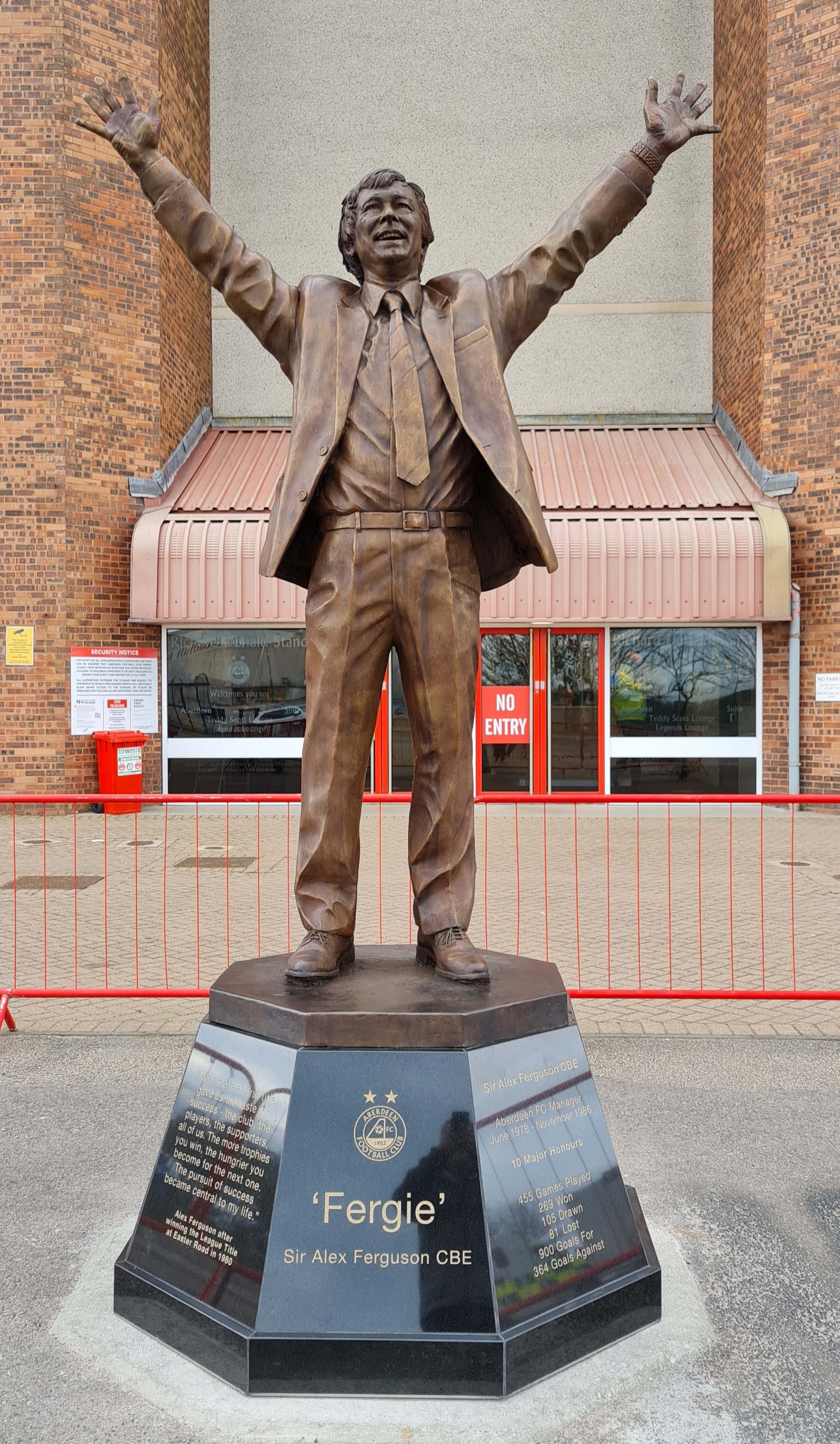
Statue of Sir Alex Ferguson at Pittodrie Stadium by Andy Edwards, unveiled 25 February 2022

== Personal life ==
Ferguson lives in Wilmslow, Cheshire, and was married to Cathy Holding from 1966 until her death in October 2023. They had three sons together: Mark (born 1968); and twins Darren, who was also a professional footballer and used to be manager of Doncaster Rovers, Peterborough United, and Preston North End; and Jason (born 1972), who formed a sports management company. Jason directed the 2021 documentary Sir Alex Ferguson: Never Give In about his father.

In 1991, Ferguson became a wine collector after being shown a display of bottles from Château d'Yquem and Château Pétrus while in Montpellier, France. In 2014, he put part of his vast collection up for auction with Christie's, with their head of wine David Elswood describing his taste as "exceptional", valued at up to £3 million. After the first of three auctions, Ferguson had sold 229 lots for £2.2 million.

=== Intellectual interests ===
Beyond football, Ferguson has expressed a strong interest in history, politics and reading. In a 2009 interview with Alastair Campbell, he stated that he regularly read history and political history, believing that historical accounts could offer lessons applicable to leadership and management. He particularly praised Doris Kearns Goodwin's Team of Rivals, drawing parallels between Abraham Lincoln's management of political rivals and the challenges of managing a football team. Campbell also praised Ferguson's memory, writing in 2011, "He has a phenomenal memory." During a visit to Trinity College Dublin in 2010, he described his reading habits, noting that he typically kept several books beside his bed. His reading at the time included biographies of Michelangelo and Ted Kennedy, as well as Andrew Marr's A History of Modern Britain. Ferguson has shown a particular fascination with the American Civil War. In a 2013 interview with Charlie Rose, he discussed his extensive reading on the subject, visits to historical sites including Gettysburg and Manassas, and a meeting with historian James M. McPherson. He also recalled listening to lectures by historian Gary W. Gallagher during his daily commute to work.

=== Health ===
Ferguson underwent an emergency surgery on 5 May 2018, after having a brain haemorrhage. He made a recovery from the surgery and attended his first match at Old Trafford since then on 22 September 2018.

In May 2026, Ferguson was taken to hospital after becoming unwell at Old Trafford before Manchester United's match against Liverpool.

=== Political involvement ===
A self-described socialist and a lifelong supporter of the Labour Party, Ferguson is a personal friend of Tony Blair's political strategist Alastair Campbell and was enthusiastic about New Labour's 1997 electoral victory. He was in regular phone contact with Campbell during the 1997 campaign, offering his views and advice. In 1998, Ferguson was named in a list of the Labour Party's biggest private financial donors. He later defended New Labour's record and praised Gordon Brown's handling of the 2008 global financial crisis.

In January 2011, Graham Stringer, a Labour MP in Manchester and Manchester United supporter, called for Ferguson to be made a life peer. Stringer and fellow Manchester Labour MP Paul Goggins repeated this call after Ferguson announced his retirement in May 2013.

In the 2014 Scottish independence referendum, Ferguson supported Scotland remaining in the United Kingdom. He criticised the Scottish Government and First Minister Alex Salmond for denying the vote to Scots living in the UK but outside Scotland. He also objected to the self-imposed rule by the Yes Scotland campaign against accepting donations from people living outside Scotland of more than £500, which they urged the No campaign to also adopt.

Ferguson met with Keir Starmer at Old Trafford ahead of the 2024 United Kingdom general election, and endorsed Labour Party's Davy Russell during his successful 2025 Hamilton, Larkhall and Stonehouse by-election campaign to win the seat from the Scottish National Party.

=== Charitable work ===
After retiring from managing Manchester United in 2013, Ferguson continued to serve as an ambassador and director for the club. In October 2024, it was announced that at the end of the season he would leave his official role as club ambassador.

As well as having an ambassadorial role at Manchester United and other public speaking and charity engagements in retirement, he is a long-term patron of his childhood team Harmony Row, including a successful campaign for the club to have new facilities (they are now based at Braehead).

In July 2025 Ferguson was announced as an official ambassador for the Glasgow‑based dementia charity Playlist for Life, which promotes the use of personally meaningful music in dementia care. The appointment formalised several years of support for the organisation, including fundraising activities and public advocacy. In 2024 he had shared a personal “playlist of his life” on BBC Breakfast to mark National Playlist Day, encouraging others to create their own therapeutic playlists.

== Career statistics ==
=== As a player ===
Appearances and goals by club, season and competition
Club	Season	League			Cup		League Cup		Europe		Total	
Club	Season	Division	Apps	Goals	Apps	Goals	Apps	Goals	Apps	Goals	Apps	Goals
Queen's Park
Queen's Park	1957–58	Second Division	0	0					—		0	0
Queen's Park	1958–59	Second Division	8	4					—		8	4
Queen's Park	1959–60	Second Division	23	11					—		23	11
Queen's Park	Total		31	15					—		31	15
St Johnstone	1960–61	Division One							—			
St Johnstone	1961–62	Division One							—			
St Johnstone	1962–63	Second Division							—			
St Johnstone	1963–64	Division One							—			
St Johnstone	Total		37	19					—			
Dunfermline Athletic	1964–65	Division One							—			
Dunfermline Athletic	1965–66	Division One		31					—			31
Dunfermline Athletic	1966–67	Division One							—			
Dunfermline Athletic	Total		89	66					—			
Rangers	1967–68	Division One	29	19	5	0	6	2	6	3	46	24
Rangers	1968–69	Division One	12	6	1	0	4	2	3	3	20	11
Rangers	Total		41	25	6	0	10	4	9	6	66	35
Falkirk	1969–70	Second Division	21	15	3	3			—			
Falkirk	1970–71	Division One	28	13	0	0			—			
Falkirk	1971–72	Division One	28	9	2	1	9	4	—		39	14
Falkirk	1972–73	Division One	18	0	2	1	0	0	—		20	1
Falkirk	Total		95	37	7	5			—			
Ayr United	1973–74	Division One	24	9	4	1	0	0	—		28	10
Career total			317	171					9	6		

=== As a manager ===
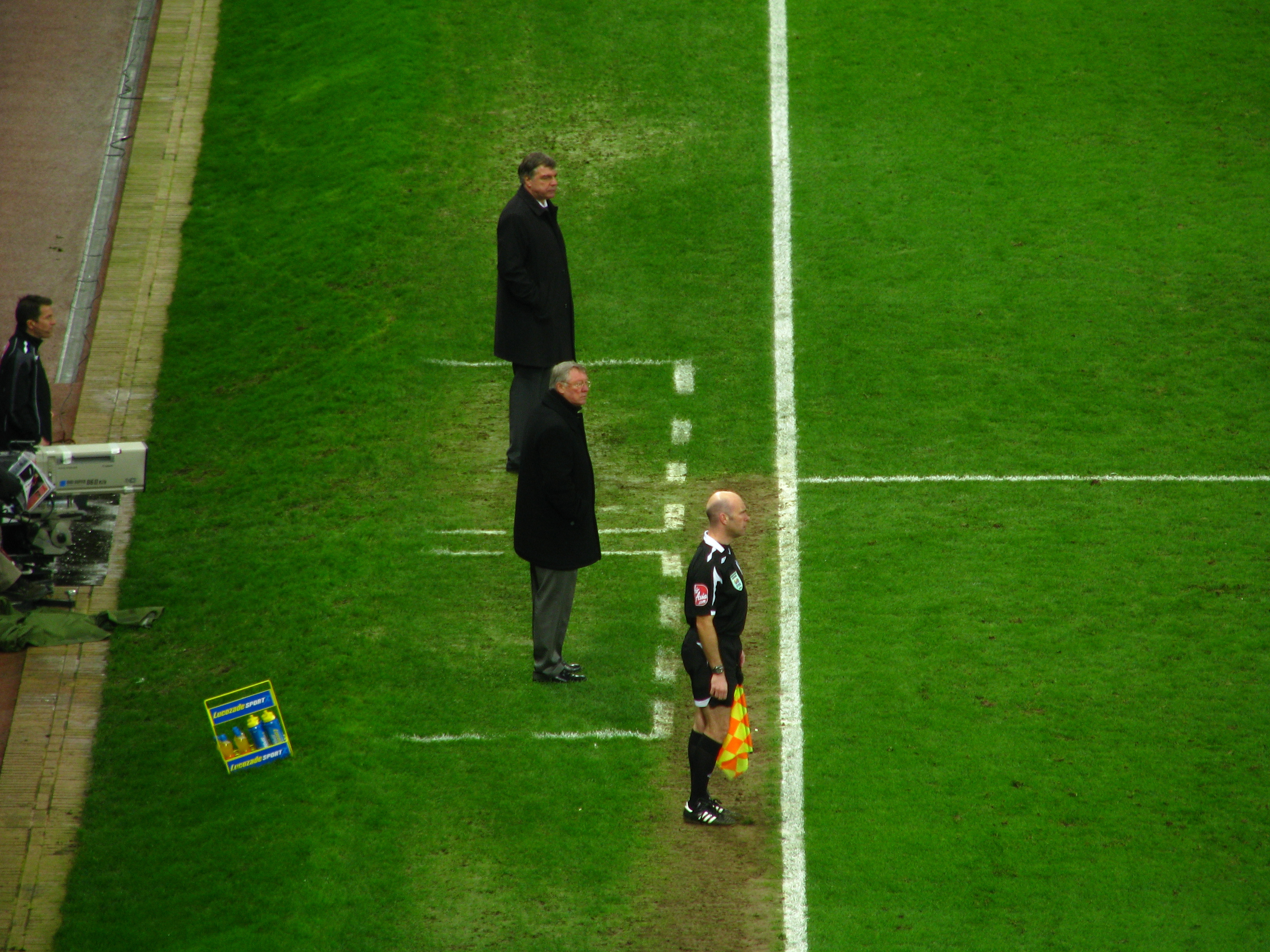
Ferguson managing Manchester United in 2009

Managerial record by team and tenure
Team	Nat.	From	To	Record					Ref.
Team	Nat.	From	To	G	W	D	L	Win %	Ref.
East Stirlingshire	(Scotland)	1 July 1974	30 June 1975	17	9	2	6	52.94	
St Mirren	(Scotland)	1 July 1975	30 June 1978	169	74	41	54	43.79	
Aberdeen	(Scotland)	1 July 1978	6 November 1986	459	272	105	82	59.26	
Scotland	(Scotland)	1 October 1985	30 June 1986	10	3	4	3	30.00	
Manchester United	(England)	6 November 1986	19 May 2013	1,500	895	338	267	59.67	
Career Total				2,155	1,253	490	412	58.14	

== Honours ==
=== Player ===
St Johnstone

- Scottish Division Two: 1962–63

Falkirk

- Scottish Division Two: 1969–70

Individual

- Scottish Division One top scorer: 1965–66
- Dunfermline Athletic Hall of Fame: 2006–07
- Queen's Park Lifetime Membership Award: October 2012

=== Manager ===
Ferguson was made an Inaugural Inductee of the English Football Hall of Fame in 2002 in recognition of his impact on the English game as a manager. In 2003, Ferguson became an inaugural recipient of the FA Coaching Diploma, awarded to all coaches who had at least ten years' experience of being a manager or head coach. He is the Vice-President of the National Football Museum, based in Manchester, and a member of the Executive Committee of the League Managers Association. On 5 November 2011, the Old Trafford North Stand was officially renamed the Sir Alex Ferguson Stand in honour of his 25 years as manager of Manchester United.

In addition to being the only manager to win the top league honours, and the 'Double', north and south of the England–Scotland border (winning the Premier League with Manchester United, and the Scottish Premier Division with Aberdeen), he is also the last manager to win the Scottish league championship with a non Old Firm team, achieving this in the 1984–85 season with Aberdeen.

Ferguson is the second-most decorated manager in European football competitions with seven honours, behind only Carlo Ancelotti. Ferguson won the top division title in England a record 13 times. He is also the first manager in the history of the English league to win three consecutive league titles, which he did twice. Ferguson won 10 Manager of the Year awards, 27 Manager of the Month awards, and managed the most games in the UEFA Champions League (190).

St Mirren

- Scottish First Division: 1976–77

Aberdeen

- Scottish Premier Division: 1979–80, 1983–84, 1984–85
- Scottish Cup: 1981–82, 1982–83, 1983–84, 1985–86
- Scottish League Cup: 1985–86; runner-up: 1978–79, 1979–80
- Drybrough Cup: 1980
- European Cup Winners' Cup: 1982–83
- European Super Cup: 1983

Manchester United

- Premier League: 1992–93, 1993–94, 1995–96, 1996–97, 1998–99, 1999–2000, 2000–01, 2002–03, 2006–07, 2007–08, 2008–09, 2010–11, 2012–13
- FA Cup: 1989–90, 1993–94, 1995–96, 1998–99, 2003–04; runner-up: 1994–95, 2004–05, 2006–07
- Football League Cup: 1991–92, 2005–06, 2008–09, 2009–10; runner-up: 1990–91, 1993–94, 2002–03
- FA Charity/Community Shield: 1990 (shared), 1993, 1994, 1996, 1997, 2003, 2007, 2008, 2010, 2011
- UEFA Champions League: 1998–99, 2007–08; runner-up: 2008–09, 2010–11
- European Cup Winners' Cup: 1990–91
- European Super Cup: 1991
- Intercontinental Cup: 1999
- FIFA Club World Cup: 2008

Individual

- LMA Manager of the Decade: 1990s
- LMA Manager of the Year: 1992–93, 1998–99, 2007–08, 2010–11, 2012–13
- LMA Special Merit Award: 2009, 2011
- Premier League Manager of the Season: 1993–94, 1995–96, 1996–97, 1998–99, 1999–2000, 2002–03, 2006–07, 2007–08, 2008–09, 2010–11, 2012–13
- Premier League Manager of the Month: August 1993, October 1994, February 1996, March 1996, February 1997, October 1997, January 1999, April 1999, August 1999, March 2000, April 2000, February 2001, April 2003, December 2003, February 2005, March 2006, August 2006, October 2006, February 2007, January 2008, March 2008, January 2009, April 2009, September 2009, January 2011, August 2011, October 2012
- UEFA Manager of the Year: 1998–99
- UEFA Team of the Year: 2007, 2008
- Onze d'Or Coach of the Year: 1999, 2007, 2008
- World Soccer Magazine World Manager of the Year: 1993, 1999, 2007, 2008
- IFFHS World's Best Club Coach: 1999, 2008
- IFFHS All Time World's Best Coach 1996–2020
- Laureus World Sports Award for Team of the Year: 2000
- BBC Sports Personality of the Year Coach Award: 1999
- BBC Sports Personality Team of the Year Award: 1999
- BBC Sports Personality of the Year Lifetime Achievement Award: 2001
- World Soccer Greatest Manager of All Time: 2013
- ESPN Greatest Manager of All Time: 2013
- France Football 2nd Greatest Manager of All Time: 2019
- Sports Illustrated Greatest Manager of All Time: 2019
- Globe Soccer Awards Coach of the Century 2001–2020 (2nd among the runners-up)
- BBC Sports Personality Diamond Award: 2013
- English Football Hall of Fame (Manager): 2002
- Scottish Football Hall of Fame: 2004
- European Hall of Fame (Manager): 2008
- FIFA Presidential Award: 2011
- Premier League 10 Seasons Awards (1992–93 – 2001–02)
  - Manager of the Decade
  - Most Coaching Appearances (392 games)
- Premier League 20 Seasons Awards (1992–93 – 2011–12)
  - Best Manager
- FWA Tribute Award: 1996
- PFA Merit Award: 2007
- Premier League Merit Award: 2012–13
- Mussabini Medal: 1999
- SFA Special Merit Award: 1985
- VCGB Scottish Sports Personality of the Year: 1983
- Scottish Football Personality of the Year: 1979–80, 1982–83
- Premier League Hall of Fame: 2023

=== Orders and special awards ===
- Officer of the Order of the British Empire (OBE): 1985 New Years Honours List
- Commander of the Order of the British Empire (CBE): 1995 New Years Honours List
- Knight Bachelor (Kt.): 1999 Queen's Birthday Honours List
- Freedom of the City of Aberdeen: 1999
- Freedom of the City of Glasgow: 1999
- Freedom of the City of Manchester: 2000
- Freedom of the Borough of Trafford: 2013

=== Honorary degrees ===
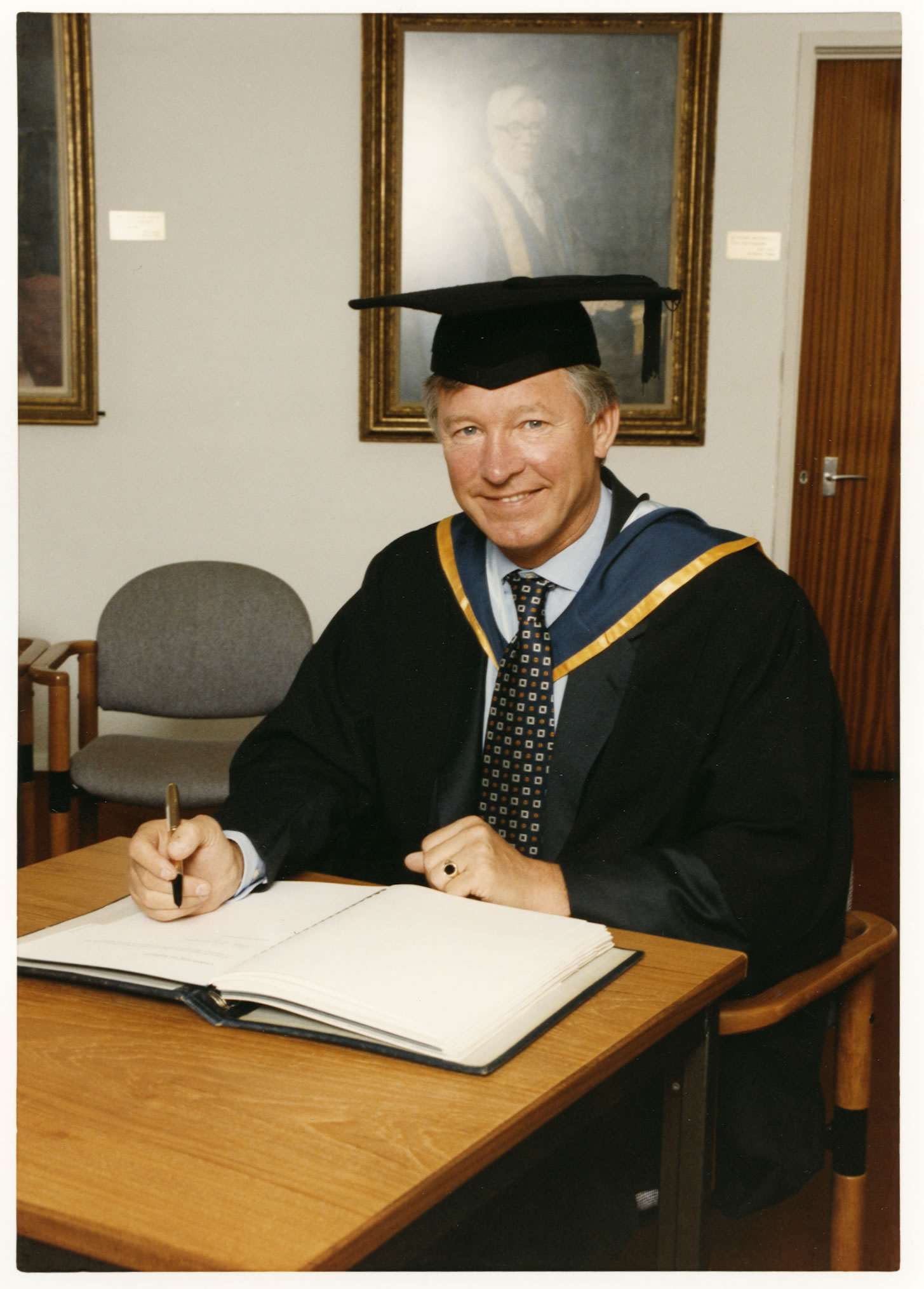
Ferguson receiving an honorary degree from Salford University in 1996

Ferguson has received at least eight honorary degrees. These include:

Date	University	Degree
1996	University of Salford	Master of Arts (MA)
December 1997	Robert Gordon University	Doctor of Laws (LL.D)
2001	Glasgow Caledonian University	Doctorate
2002	University of St Andrews	Doctorate
2009	Manchester Metropolitan University	Doctor of Business Administration (DBA)
29 June 2011	University of Stirling	Doctor of the University (D.Univ)
12 October 2011	University of Manchester	Doctorate
2014	Ulster University	Doctor of Science (D.Sc)

== Published works ==
- Ferguson, Alex; Meek, David (1992). Alex Ferguson: 6 Years at United. Mainstream. ISBN 978-1851584444.
- Ferguson, Alex; Fitton, Peter (1993). Just Champion!. Manchester United Football Club. ISBN 978-0952050919.
- Ferguson, Alex; Ball, Peter (1995). A Year in the Life: The Manager's Diary. Manchester United Football Club. ISBN 978-1852275211.
- Ferguson, Alex; Meek, David (1997). A Will to Win: The Manager's Diary. Andre Deutsch. ISBN 978-0233993683.
- Ferguson, Alex (2000). The Unique Treble. Hodder & Stoughton. ISBN 978-0340792612.
- Ferguson, Alex (2000). Managing My Life: The Autobiography. Coronet Books. ISBN 0-340-72856-6.
- Ferguson, Alex (2013). My Autobiography. Hodder & Stoughton. ISBN 978-0-340-91939-2. "The motto of the Ferguson clan in Scotland is: 'Dulcius ex asperis' or, 'Sweeter after difficulties'. That optimism served me well through 39 years of football management."
- Ferguson, Alex; Moritz, Michael (2015). Leading: Lessons in leadership from the legendary Manchester United manager. Hachette UK. ISBN 978-1473621169.
- Ferguson, Alex (14 November 1985). A Light in the North: Seven Years with Aberdeen (1st ed.). Edinburgh: Mainstream Publishing. ISBN 978-1851580071.

== See also ==
- List of English football championship winning managers
- List of longest managerial reigns in association football
- List of football managers with the most matches
