= List of Clydebank F.C. (1965) seasons =

This is a list of seasons played by Clydebank F.C. (1965) in Scottish football, from their foundation as a professional club in 1965 to their takeover by Airdrie United in 2002. It details the club's achievements in senior league and cup competitions and the top scorers for each season. The list of top scorers also chronicles how the club's scoring records have progressed throughout the club's history.

== Summary ==
Several clubs using the Clydebank name and wearing white-and-red colours had represented the town, including a team that entered the Scottish Cup in the 1890s and a separate entity which played in the Scottish Football League (SFL) from 1914 to 1931. In 1964, the town's Junior club, Clydebank Juniors, which had been playing since 1899, was merged with SFL club East Stirlingshire (based in Falkirk). The merger was ended after one season after a legal challenge by East Stirlingshire supporters. The Steedman brothers, who had been owners of East Stirlingshire, immediately decided to create a new club in Clydebank to apply for SFL entry, which was granted after one year playing in the Combined Reserve League.

The Bankies never won a senior competition other than the third level Second Division in 1976, but did play in the top tier of Scottish football for three seasons, and reached the Scottish Cup semi-finals in 1990.

In 1996, their Kilbowie Park ground was sold by the club owners, and the team played in Dumbarton for three seasons followed by three in Greenock (a town 13 miles away on the opposite bank of the River Clyde) whole the owners attempted to sell their place in the league. During this period, the fans staged numerous protests including a boycott of a fixture against East Stirlingshire in 1999, resulting in an official attendance of 29 being recorded.

In May 2002, a group of businessmen who had been unable to prevent Airdrieonians going out of business after 124 years subsequently took control of Clydebank, renamed them Airdrie United and relocated the team to Airdrie for 2002–03, changing the playing colours to those of the original Airdrieonians but retaining the league place of Clydebank. The Clydebank supporters reclaimed their club's name and crest and successfully applied to join the Junior setup for the following season – this is the Clydebank F.C. active in the 2020s.

== Seasons ==
Season	League		Scottish Cup	League Cup	Other	Top scorer	
Season	Division	Position	Scottish Cup	League Cup	Other	Top scorer	
1963–64	Competed in the Junior leagues as Clydebank Juniors.						
1964–65	Competed in the 1964–65 Scottish Division Two as ES Clydebank (see List of East Stirlingshire F.C. seasons); this is considered to be part of East Stirlingshire's record.						
1965–66	Competed in amateur competitions such as the Combined Reserve League.						
1966–67	Division Two	18th	Preliminary round 2	Group stage	N/A	Unknown	Unknown
1967–68	Division Two	9th	Preliminary round 2	Second round	N/A	Unknown	Unknown
1968–69	Division Two	13th	Preliminary round 1	Group stage	N/A	Unknown	Unknown
1969–70	Division Two	13th	Second round	Group stage	N/A	Unknown	Unknown
1970–71	Division Two	5th	Third round	Group stage	N/A	Unknown	Unknown
1971–72	Division Two	9th	Fourth round	Quarter-final	N/A	Unknown	Unknown
1972–73	Division Two	17th	First round	Group stage	N/A	Unknown	Unknown
1973–74	Division Two	10th	Third round	Group stage	N/A	Unknown	Unknown
1974–75	Division Two	7th (Note: The teams placed 1st–6th were added to the new First Division (below a new Premier Division) with the remaining clubs making up the new Second Division.)	Fourth round	Group stage	N/A	Unknown	Unknown
1975–76	Second Division	1st	Second round	Quarter-final	Spring Cup – Runners-up	Unknown	Unknown
1976–77	First Division	1st	Fourth round	Quarter-final	N/A	Unknown	Unknown
1977–78	Premier Division	10th	Third round	Third round	N/A	Unknown	Unknown
1978–79	First Division	3rd	Fourth round	Third round	Stirlingshire Cup winners	Unknown	Unknown
1979–80	First Division	9th	Third round	Second round	Drybrough Cup – First round Stirlingshire Cup winners	Unknown	Unknown
1980–81	First Division	10th	Quarter-final	Quarter-final	N/A	Unknown	Unknown
1981–82	First Division	4th	Fourth round	Group stage	N/A	Unknown	Unknown
1982–83	First Division	3rd	Third round	Group stage	N/A	Unknown	Unknown
1983–84	First Division	4th	Fourth round	Group stage	N/A	Unknown	Unknown
1984–85	First Division	2nd	Third round	Second round	N/A	Unknown	Unknown
1985–86	Premier Division	10th	Third round	Third round	N/A	Unknown	Unknown
1986–87	Premier Division	11th	Quarter-final	Third round	N/A	Unknown	Unknown
1987–88	First Division	3rd	Fourth round	Second round	N/A	Unknown	Unknown
1988–89	First Division	3rd	Fourth round	Third round	N/A	Unknown	Unknown
1989–90	First Division	3rd	Semi-final	Second round	N/A	Unknown	Unknown
1990–91	First Division	8th	Third round	Second round	Challenge Cup; First round	Unknown	Unknown
1991–92	First Division	9th	Fourth round	Second round	Challenge Cup; Second round	Unknown	Unknown
1992–93	First Division	8th	Quarter-final	Second round	Challenge Cup; Second round	Unknown	Unknown
1993–94	First Division	5th (Note: The teams placed 8th–12th were relegated to the Second Division, with a new Third Division below.)	Third round	Second round	Challenge Cup; Quarter-final	Unknown	Unknown
1994–95	First Division	8th	Third round	Second round	Challenge Cup; Semi-final	Unknown	Unknown
1995–96 (Note: Last season playing home matches at Kilbowie Park.)	First Division	7th	Third round	Second round	Challenge Cup; Quarter-final	Unknown	Unknown
1996–97 (Note: Home matches played at Boghead Park, Dumbarton.)	First Division	9th	Third round	Second round	Challenge Cup; First round	Unknown	Unknown
1997–98	Second Division	2nd	Third round	Second round	Challenge Cup; Quarter-final	Unknown	Unknown
1998–99	First Division	7th	Fourth round	Second round	N/A (Note: The Scottish Challenge Cup was not held in the 1998–99 season.)	Unknown	Unknown
1999–2000 (Note: Home matches played at Cappielow Park, Greenock.)	First Division	10th	Fourth round	First round	Challenge Cup; Quarter-final	Unknown	Unknown
2000–01	Second Division	5th	First round	First round	Challenge Cup; Quarter-final	Unknown	Unknown
2001–02	Second Division	4th	Second round	First round	Challenge Cup; Quarter-final	Unknown	Unknown
2002–03	Club rebranded as Airdrie United (seasons) and moved to Airdrie to represent the community after Airdrieonians (seasons) were dissolved.						
2003–04	Supporters of Clydebank established a new club to play in the West region of the Junior leagues.						

== League performance summary ==
The Scottish Football League was founded in 1890 and, other than during seven years of hiatus during World War II, (Note: The incomplete 1939–40 edition has not been counted in the totals.) the national top division has been played every season since. (Note: The top tier became the Scottish Premier League in 1998, and all four divisions became the Scottish Professional Football League in 2013.) The following is a summary of Clydebank's divisional status from their foundation as a separate senior club in 1965 until their move to Airdrie in 2002:

- 37 total eligible seasons
- 3 seasons in top level (Note: Has existed between 1890–1939, and since 1946.)
- 29 seasons in second level (Note: Has existed between 1893–1915, 1921–1939 and since 1946.)
- 4 seasons in third level (Note: Has existed between 1923–1926, 1946–1949, and since 1976.)
- 0 seasons in fourth level (Note: Has existed since 1994.)
- 1 season not involved – before club was league member

== Sources ==
- Soccerbase
- FitbaStats
- Football Club History Database
