= 1974–75 Clydebank F.C. season =

Clydebank F.C.
1974–75 season
- Manager: Jack Steedman
- Scottish League Division Two: 7th
- Scottish Cup: 4th Round
- Scottish League Cup: Group stage
Home colours

The 1974–75 season was Clydebank's ninth season after being elected to the Scottish Football League. They competed in the Scottish League Division Two, where they finished 7th in the table, Scottish League Cup and Scottish Cup.

== Results ==
=== Division 2 ===
Match Day	Date	Opponent	H/A	Score	Clydebank Scorer(s)	Attendance
1	31 August	Queen of the South	A	0–3		1,490
2	4 September	Stranraer	H	0–3		803
3	7 September	Meadowbank Thistle	H	3–0	Roxburgh (2), White	916
4	11 September	Stenhousemuir	A	2–1	McGovern, White	281
5	14 September	Berwick Rangers	A	0–2		371
6	18 September	Stenhousemuir	H	1–1	McCallan	697
7	21 September	East Fife	H	0–1		898
8	25 September	Stranraer	A	1–2	McCallan	718
9	28 September	Forfar Athletic	H	2–2	McCallan, Fallon	888
10	5 October	Brechin City	A	0–0		339
11	12 October	Montrose	H	1–1	Kane	983
12	19 October	Queen's Park	A	0–1		570
13	26 October	St Mirren	H	0–0		1,614
14	2 November	Stirling Albion	A	3–3	Kane, McCallan, Hall	1,035
15	9 November	East Stirlingshire	H	0–3		889
16	16 November	Albion Rovers	A	3–1	McGovern, Hay, White	422
17	23 November	Raith Rovers	A	2–1	Larnach, McGovern	1,111
18	30 November	Cowdenbeath	H	2–1	McCallan, Larnach	871
19	7 December	Hamilton Academical	A	1–0	McGovern	2,229
20	14 December	Alloa Athletic	H	4–1	McCallan, Larnach, Cooper, McGovern	962
21	21 December	Falkirk	A	1–0	McGovern	1,740
22	28 December	Queen of the South	H	3–1	McCall, Kane, Larnach	1,355
23	30 December	Meadowbank Thistle	A	0–1		1,255
24	11 January	East Fife	A	0–1		2,009
25	18 January	Forfar Athletic	A	2–0	Cooper, McCallan	576
26	1 February	Brechin City	H	3–1	McCall, Kane, McCallan	1,476
27	8 February	Montrose	A	1–1	Kane	1,205
28	22 February	Queen's Park	H	2–1	Henderson, Larnach	
29	1 March	St Mirren	A	0–2		1,443
30	8 March	Stirling Albion	H	0–0		1,362
31	15 March	East Stirlingshire	A	0–1		481
32	22 March	Albion Rovers	H	2–0	Larnach, McCallan	400
33	29 March	Raith Rovers	H	3–2	Caskie, Cooper, Hall	1,126
34	5 April	Cowdenbeath	H	3–0	Caskie (2), Larnach	429
35	12 April	Hamilton Academical	H	1–0	Caskie	1,739
36	19 April	Alloa Athletic	A	0–1		350
37	26 April	Falkirk	H	2–0	Cooper, McCallan	2,379
38	30 April	Berwick Rangers	H	2–1	McCall, Caskie	955

==== Final League table ====
P	Team	Pld	W	D	L	GF	GA	GD	Pts
6	St Mirren	38	19	8	11	75	52	22	46
7	Clydebank	38	18	8	12	50	40	10	44
8	Stirling Albion	38	17	9	12	67	55	12	43

=== Scottish League Cup ===
==== Group 7 ====
Round	Date	Opponent	H/A	Score	Clydebank Scorer(s)	Attendance
1	10 August	Airdrieonians	A	0–4		1,672
2	14 August	St Mirren	H	2–0	Fallon, Hughes	1,184
3	17 August	Stirling Albion	H	3–1	Gilmour, McCallan, McGovern	1,159
4	21 August	St Mirren	A	0–1		2,759
5	24 August	Stirling Albion	A	2–5	McGovern (2)	1,255
6	28 August	Airdrieonians	H	1–2	McGovern	1,377

==== Group 7 Final Table ====
P	Team	Pld	W	D	L	GF	GA	GD	Pts
1	Airdrieonians	6	4	0	2	16	6	10	8
2	St Mirren	6	4	0	2	9	10	−1	8
3	Stirling Albion	6	2	0	4	12	16	−4	4
4	Clydebank	6	2	0	4	8	13	−5	4

=== Scottish Cup ===
Round	Date	Opponent	H/A	Score	Clydebank Scorer(s)	Attendance
R2	4 January	Cowdenbeath	A	2–0	Cooper, Abel	444
R3	28 January	Dunfermline Athletic	H	2–1	McCallan, Kane	3,500
R2	15 February	Celtic	A	1–4	McCallan	21,000
