= 1969–70 Clydebank F.C. season =

Clydebank F.C.
1969–70 season
- Manager: Jack Steedman
- Scottish League Division Two: 13th
- Scottish Cup: 2nd Preliminary Round
- Scottish League Cup: Group stage
Home colours

The 1969–70 season was Clydebank's fourth season in the Scottish Football League. They competed in the Scottish League Division Two where they finished 13th in the table, Scottish League Cup and Scottish Cup.

== Results ==
=== Division 2 ===
Match Day	Date	Opponent	H/A	Score	Clydebank Scorer(s)	Attendance
1	30 August	Montrose	A	1–4	McGee	
2	3 September	Cowdenbeath	H	1–3	Munro	
3	6 September	Arbroath	H	0–2		3,000
4	13 September	Alloa Athletic	A	0–2		
5	17 September	Queen of the South	H	1–1	Caskie	
6	20 September	Falkirk	H	0–7		
7	24 September	Albion Rovers	A	4–1	Caskie (2), Munro, Newman	
8	27 September	Dumbarton	A	1–5	Nelson	
9	1 October	Queen's Park	H	1–3	Caskie	
10	4 October	Stenhousemuir	A	1–1	McGee	
11	11 October	East Fife	H	4–1	Caskie (3), McGee	
12	18 October	Forfar Athletic	A	1–3	O'Brien	
13	25 October	East Stirlingshire	H	2–0	Hay, Caskie	
14	1 November	Hamilton Academical	H	2–1	McGee, Munro	
15	8 November	Stranraer	A	2–1	Caskie, McGee	1,000
16	15 November	Brechin City	A	2–2	Munro, O'Brien	
17	22 November	Berwick Rangers	H	1–1	Munro	
18	29 November	Albion Rovers	H	3–0	Munro, McGee	
19	13 December	Montrose	H	1–3	Munro	
20	27 December	Stirling Albion	A	2–5	Munro, McGee	
21	1 January	Dumbarton	H	0–0		
22	3 January	Falkirk	A	2–1	Munro, Caskie	
23	17 January	Alloa Athletic	H	3–4	O'Brien (2), Munro	
24	31 January	Montrose	A	0–2		
25	14 February	Queen of the South	A	1–1	O'Brien	
26	21 February	Stenhousemuir	H	0–0		
27	28 February	East Fife	A	1–1	O'Brien	
28	7 March	Forfar Athletic	H	0–1		
29	14 March	East Stirlingshire	H	1–2	Caskie	
30	21 March	Hamilton Academical	A	2–0	Munro, McGunnigle	
31	25 March	Queen's Park	A	0–0		
32	28 March	Stranraer	H	2–1	Munro, McGee	
33	4 April	Brechin City	H	1–1	Doyle	
34	18 April	Berwick Rangers	A	2–0	Doyle, Caskie	
35	22 April	Cowdenbeath	A	2–3	Munro, Caskie	
36	27 April	Stirling Albion	H	0–2		

==== Final League table ====
P	Team	Pld	W	D	L	GF	GA	GD	Pts
12	East Stirlingshire	36	14	5	17	58	75	−17	33
13	Clydebank	36	10	10	16	47	65	−18	30
14	Brechin City	36	11	6	19	47	74	−27	28

=== Scottish League Cup ===
==== Group 7 ====
Round	Date	Opponent	H/A	Score	Clydebank Scorer(s)	Attendance
1	9 August	Dumbarton	H	1–3	Munro	3,500
2	13 August	Stranraer	A	1–1	Munro	
3	16 August	Cowdenbeath	H	3–1	????	
4	20 August	Stranraer	H	3–2		
3	23 August	Dumbarton	A	0–1		
4	27 August	Cowdenbeath	A	1–2		

==== Group 7 Final Table ====
P	Team	Pld	W	D	L	GF	GA	GD	Pts
1	Dumbarton	6	4	1	1	13	8	5	9
2	Cowdenbeath	6	2	2	2	13	14	–1	6
3	Clydebank	6	2	1	3	9	10	–1	5
4	Stranraer	6	0	4	2	10	13	–3	4

=== Scottish Cup ===
Round	Date	Opponent	H/A	Score	Clydebank Scorer(s)	Attendance
PR1	6 December	Forres Mechanics	A	2–0	Caskie, Fallon (penalty)	
PR2	24 December	Queen's Park	H	1–0	McGee	
R1	24 January	Arbroath	A	2–1	Caskie, Love	
R2	11 February	Aberdeen	A	1–2	McGee	13,082
