= 1970–71 Clydebank F.C. season =

Clydebank F.C.
1970–71 season
- Manager: Jack Steedman
- Scottish League Division Two: 5th
- Scottish Cup: 3rd Round
- Scottish League Cup: Group stage
Home colours

The 1970–71 season was Clydebank's fifth season in the Scottish Football League. They competed in the Scottish League Division Two where they finished 5th in the table, Scottish League Cup and Scottish Cup.

== Results ==
=== Division 2 ===
Match Day	Date	Opponent	H/A	Score	Clydebank Scorer(s)	Attendance
1	29 August	Queen of the South	A	1–3	Munro	2,134
2	5 September	Dumbarton	H	2–1	Hay	2,828
3	9 September	Raith Rovers	H	3–0	Munro, Kane, Gray	642
4	12 September	Montrose	A	1–0	Doyle	904
5	16 September	Raith Rovers	A	1–1	Caskie	1,051
6	19 September	Partick Thistle	H	3–1	Caskie, Fallon (penalty), Munro	5,710
7	23 September	Hamilton Academical	H	1–4	Munro	1,160
8	3 October	Arbroath	H	1–2	Munro	1,457
9	10 October	Stenhousemuir	H	2–0	Caskie, Munro	945
10	17 October	East Fife	A	0–2		3,029
11	24 October	Stirling Albion	H	6–5	Fallon (2 penalties), Caskie, Ruddy, Munro	549
12	7 November	Stranraer	H	1–3	Heap	904
13	14 November	Berwick Rangers	A	1–1	Wilson	516
14	12 December	Alloa Athletic	A	3–1	Kane (2), Hall,	705
15	26 December	Queen of the South	H	0–0		646
16	1 January	Dumbarton	A	1–3	???	2,991
17	2 January	Montrose	H	3–0	Munro, Kane, Caskie	966
18	9 January	Partick Thistle	A	0–1		4,122
19	30 January	Arbroath	A	1–0	Kane	2,069
20	6 February	Stenhousemuir	A	3–2	Hay, Wilson, Love	327
21	10 February	Dumbarton	A	1–0	Wilson	405
22	20 February	East Fife	H	3–0	Kane, Munro, Caskie	1,399
23	24 February	East Stirlingshire	H	0–0		2,175
24	27 February	Stirling Albion	A	0–2		1,241
25	6 March	Albion Rovers	H	2–0	Caskie, Kane	2,500
26	10 March	Queen's Park	H	7–1	Kane (4), Caskie (2), Munro	820
27	13 March	Stranraer	A	0–3		754
28	20 March	Berwick Rangers	H	1–2	Munro	994
29	27 March	Brechin City	H	2–0	Wilson, Kane	803
30	3 April	East Stirlingshire	A	1–0		286
31	10 April	Queen's Park	A	1–1		1,033
32	14 April	Forfar Athletic	H	3–0		588
33	17 April	Alloa Athletic	H	1–1		840
34	21 April	Hamilton Academical	A	0–0		403
35	24 April	Forfar Athletic	A	1–1		396
36	28 April	Brechin City	A	0–2		132

==== Final League table ====
P	Team	Pld	W	D	L	GF	GA	GD	Pts
4	Dumbarton	36	19	6	11	87	46	41	44
5	Clydebank	36	17	8	11	57	43	14	42
6	Montrose	36	17	7	12	78	64	14	41

=== Scottish League Cup ===
==== Group 7 ====
Round	Date	Opponent	H/A	Score	Clydebank Scorer(s)	Attendance
1	8 August	Arbroath	H	4–1	Caskie (2), Fallon (penalty), Mitchell	1,696
2	12 August	Albion Rovers	A	2–2	Wilson, Fallon (penalty)	490
3	15 August	Falkirk	H	0–3		3,182
4	19 August	Albion Rovers	H	5–1	Caskie (2), Wilson, Munro, Doyle	1,500
3	22 August	Arbroath	A	0–4		1,133
4	26 August	Falkirk	A	1–1	Munro	3,207

==== Group 7 Final Table ====
P	Team	Pld	W	D	L	GF	GA	GD	Pts
1	Falkirk	6	5	1	0	18	3	15	11
2	Clydebank	6	2	2	2	12	12	0	6
3	Arbroath	6	2	0	4	13	15	–2	4
4	Albion Rovers	6	1	1	4	8	21	–13	3

=== Scottish Cup ===
Round	Date	Opponent	H/A	Score	Clydebank Scorer(s)	Attendance
R1	5 December	East Stirlingshire	A	2–0	Kane, Caskie	675
R2	19 December	Hamilton Academical	H	2–1	Kane, Caskie	1,300
R3	23 January	Dundee United	H	0–0		4,967
R3 R	27 January	Dundee United	A	1–5	Munro	5,831
