= 1968–69 Clydebank F.C. season =

Clydebank F.C.
1968–69 season
- Manager: Jack Steedman
- Scottish League Division Two: 13th
- Scottish Cup: 1st Preliminary Round
- Scottish League Cup: Group stage
Home colours

The 1968–69 season was Clydebank's third season in the Scottish Football League. They competed in the Scottish League Division Two where they finished 13th in the table, Scottish League Cup and Scottish Cup.

== Results ==
=== Division 2 ===
Match Day	Date	Opponent	H/A	Score	Clydebank Scorer(s)	Attendance
1	21 August	Brechin City	A	1–3	Hawkshaw	700
2	4 September	Brechin City	H	0–0		800
3	7 September	Dumbarton	H	0–1		3,000
4	11 September	Cowdenbeath	A	3–3	Munro (2), Hawkshaw	500
5	14 September	Queen's Park	A	4–2	Hawkshaw (2), Munro (2)	1,000
6	18 September	Cowdenbeath	H	1–1	Caskie	700
7	21 September	Berwick Rangers	H	1–1	Hawkshaw (penalty)	1,000
8	28 September	Queen of the South	A	1–1	Hawkshaw	1,600
9	5 October	Alloa	H	0–2		1,000
10	12 October	Hamilton Academical	A	2–1	Caskie, Munro	400
11	19 October	East Stirlingshire	H	0–4		1,500
12	26 October	Montrose	A	3–5	Munro, Welsh, Hawkshaw	700
13	2 November	Stranraer	H	2–2	Hawkshaw (2)	1,000
14	16 November	Motherwell	H	0–4		2,000
15	23 November	East Fife	H	1–4	Love	1,000
16	30 November	Albion Rovers	A	1–3	Munro	1,500
17	7 December	Stenhousemuir	A	0–0		500
18	28 December	Stirling Albion	A	0–2		1,200
19	1 January	Dumbarton	A	3–3	Caskie (2), O'Brien	2,000
20	2 January	Queen's Park	H	1–3	McGhee	1,500
21	4 January	Forfar Athletic	H	3–0	Munro (2), McGhee	500
22	11 January	Queen of the South	H	3–3	Caskie, McGhee, McMillan	1,100
23	18 January	Alloa Athletic	A	3–3	Caskie, McGhee, Munro	300
24	15 February	Montrose	H	5–0	McGhee (2), Caskie, Munro, McMillan	700
25	22 February	Stranraer	A	1–1	McMillan	650
26	4 March	Hamilton Academical	H	5–0	Fallon (2 penalties), Munro (2), Caskie	1,000
27	8 March	Motherwell	A	1–2	Hawkshaw	4,500
28	15 March	East Fife	A	1–1	Munro	1,200
29	22 March	Albion Rovers	H	2–0	Caskie (2)	450
30	29 March	Stenhousemuir	H	2–2	O'Brien, Caskie	500
31	5 April	Ayr United	A	0–0		3,500
32	12 April	Forfar Athletic	A	0–1		1,090
33	14 April	East Stirlingshire	A	0–1		500
34	19 April	Stirling Albion	H	2–2	Caskie, Munro	1,000
35	26 April	Berwick Rangers	A	0–5		200
36	28 April	Ayr United	H	0–1		800

==== Final League table ====
P	Team	Pld	W	D	L	GF	GA	GD	Pts
12	Cowdenbeath	36	12	5	19	54	67	−13	29
13	Clydebank	36	6	15	15	52	67	−15	27
14	Dumbarton	36	11	5	20	46	69	−23	27

=== Scottish League Cup ===
==== Group 6 ====
Round	Date	Opponent	H/A	Score	Clydebank Scorer(s)	Attendance
1	10 August	East Fife	A	0–2		3,000
2	14 August	Berwick Rangers	H	2–4	Collumbine (2)	2,000
3	17 August	Queen of the South	A	2–1	Hawkshaw (penalty), McMillan	1,500
4	24 August	East Fife	H	1–3	McGunnigle	3,000
3	28 August	Berwick Rangers	A	0–3		1,200
4	31 August	Queen of the South	H	1–1	Hawkshaw	750

==== Group 6 Final Table ====
P	Team	Pld	W	D	L	GF	GA	GD	Pts
1	East Fife	6	4	2	0	12	4	7	10
2	Queen of the South	6	1	4	1	7	6	1	6
3	Berwick Rangers	6	2	1	3	9	10	–1	5
4	Clydebank	6	1	1	4	6	14	–7	3

=== Scottish Cup ===
Round	Date	Opponent	H/A	Score	Clydebank Scorer(s)	Attendance
PR1	14 December	Cowdenbeath	A	0–1		398
