= 1971–72 Clydebank F.C. season =

Clydebank F.C.
1971–72 season
- Manager: Jack Steedman
- Scottish League Division Two: 9th
- Scottish Cup: 4th Round
- Scottish League Cup: Quarter-finalists
Home colours

The 1971–72 season was Clydebank's sixth season in the Scottish Football League. They competed in the Scottish League Division Two where they finished 9th in the table, Scottish League Cup where they reached the quarter-finals and Scottish Cup.

== Results ==
=== Division 2 ===
Match Day	Date	Opponent	H/A	Score	Clydebank Scorer(s)	Attendance
1	4 September	Dumbarton	A	3–2	Kane (2), Bolton	2,668
2	11 September	Queen of the South	H	1–3	Kane	1,768
3	15 September	Queen's Park	H	1–1	Munro	1,142
4	18 September	Berwick Rangers	A	1–1	Kane	701
5	25 September	Arbroath	H	0–0		1,483
6	29 September	St Mirren	H	1–3	Love	2,148
7	2 October	Albion Rovers	A	0–2		640
8	9 October	Montrose	H	1–2	Munro	1,221
9	16 October	Alloa Athletic	A	1–1	Kane	1,044
10	23 October	Cowdenbeath	H	1–4	Caskie	990
11	30 October	East Stirlingshire	A	1–0	Gray (penalty)	560
12	6 November	Forfar Athletic	H	2–0	Currie, Kane	985
13	13 November	Raith Rovers	A	3–1	Munro, McGee, Currie	2,086
14	20 November	Hamilton Academical	H	7–1	Kane (3), Caskie, Hay, Munro	750
15	27 November	Stranraer	A	2–2	Kane (2)	957
16	11 December	Brechin City	H	1–2	Hay	916
17	18 December	Stirling Albion	A	1–1	Currie	1,540
18	25 December	Stenhousemuir	H	2–1	Munro, Hay	745
19	27 December	St Mirren	A	1–1	Fallon	3,773
20	1 January	Dumbarton	H	2–3	Fallon, McPaul	3,861
21	3 January	Queen of the South	A	0–2		3,511
22	8 January	Berwick Rangers	H	0–0		983
23	15 January	Arbroath	A	2–1	McPaul, Munro	1,523
24	22 January	Albion Rovers	H	3–1	Fallon (2 penalties), Kane	1,000
25	29 January	Montrose	A	2–1	Kane, McPaul	986
26	12 February	Alloa Athletic	H	3–1	Newman, Fallon (penalty), Munro	1,253
27	19 February	Cowdenbeath	A	0–0		1,585
28	4 March	East Stirlingshire	H	3–4	Munro (2), McPaul	953
29	11 March	Forfar Athletic	A	1–2	Munro	951
30	25 March	Hamilton Academical	A	1–0	Munro	943
31	1 April	Stranraer	H	3–0	Munro, McPaul, Currie	1,214
32	11 April	Raith Rovers	H	3–1	Fallon, Currie, McPaul	977
33	15 April	Brechin City	A	2–1	Hay, Munro	346
34	18 April	Queen's Park	A	4–4	Currie (2), Munro (2)	577
35	22 April	Stirling Albion	H	0–0		1,475
36	29 April	Stenhousemuir	A	1–3		280

==== Final League table ====
P	Team	Pld	W	D	L	GF	GA	GD	Pts
8	East Stirlingshire	36	17	7	12	60	58	2	41
9	Clydebank	36	14	11	11	60	52	8	39
10	Montrose	36	15	6	15	73	54	19	36

=== Scottish League Cup ===
==== Group 5 ====
Round	Date	Opponent	H/A	Score	Clydebank Scorer(s)	Attendance
1	14 August	Berwick Rangers	A	2–2	Kane, Caskie	448
2	18 August	Queen's Park	H	3–2	McFarlane (2), Kane	1,665
3	21 August	Cowdenbeath	H	2–1	Russell, Moy	1,905
4	25 August	Queen's Park	A	1–1	Kane, Caskie	980
3	28 August	Berwick Rangers	H	5–0	McGee (2), Munro, Caskie, McFarlane	1,948
4	1 September	Cowdenbeath	A	4–3	Kinnell, Caskie, Bostock, McFarlane	727

==== Group 5 Final Table ====
P	Team	Pld	W	D	L	GF	GA	GD	Pts
1	Clydebank	6	4	2	0	17	9	8	10
2	Queen's Park	6	2	2	2	8	8	0	6
3	Cowdenbeath	6	1	2	3	8	10	–2	4
4	Berwick Rangers	6	1	2	3	7	13	–6	4

==== Knockout stage ====
Round	Date	Opponent	H/A	Score	Clydebank Scorer(s)	Attendance
QF L1	8 September	Celtic	H	0–5		10,600
QF L2	22 September	Celtic	A	2–6	Hay, Ruddy	15,045

=== Scottish Cup ===
Round	Date	Opponent	H/A	Score	Clydebank Scorer(s)	Attendance
R3	5 February	East Fife	H	1–1	Kane	1,955
R3 R	9 January	East Fife	A	1–0	McGee	5,104
R4	26 February	Heart of Midlothian	A	0–4		11,953
