= 1977–78 Clydebank F.C. season =

Clydebank F.C.
1977–78 season
- Manager: Bill Munro
- Scottish League Premier Division: 10th (relegated)
- Scottish Cup: 3rd Round
- Scottish League Cup: 3rd Round
- Anglo-Scottish Cup: 1st Round (Scottish)

The 1977–78 season was Clydebank's twelfth season after being elected to the Scottish Football League. They finished bottom of the table in the Scottish Premier Division with only six wins and seven draws and returned to Division One the following season. They also competed in the Scottish League Cup and Scottish Cup and for the second season running, the Anglo-Scottish Cup.

== Results ==
=== Division 1 ===
Match Day	Date	Opponent	H/A	Score	Clydebank Scorer(s)	Attendance
1	13 August	St Mirren	A	1–1		
2	20 August	Aberdeen	H	1–3		
3	27 August	Hibernian	A	0–2		
4	10 September	Partick Thistle	H	0–4		
5	17 September	Dundee United	H	0–3		
6	24 September	Celtic	A	0–1		
7	1 October	Rangers	A	1–4		
8	8 October	Motherwell	H	2–1		
9	15 October	Ayr United	A	0–2		
10	22 October	St Mirren	H	2–2		
11	29 October	Aberdeen	A	1–1		
12	5 November	Hibernian	H	1–0		
13	12 November	Partick Thisle	A	0–1		
14	19 November	Dundee United	A	0–4		
15	10 December	Motherwell	A	1–2		
16	17 December	Ayr United	H	0–2		
17	24 December	St Mirren	A	0–2		
18	31 December	Aberdeen	H	0–1		
19	2 January	Hibernian	A	0–2		
20	7 January	Partick Thistle	H	2–0		
21	4 February	Rangers	A	0–1		
22	19 February	Rangers	H	0–3		
23	25 February	Ayr United	A	0–0		
24	4 March	St Mirren	H	2–2		
25	11 March	Motherwell	H	0–2		
26	18 March	Hibernian	H	0–3		
27	21 March	Aberdeen	A	0–2		
28	25 March	Partick Thistle	A	0–0		
29	8 April	Celtic	H	3–2		
30	12 April	Dundee United	A	0–1		
31	15 April	Rangers	H	0–2		
32	17 April	Celtic	A	2–5		
33	22 April	Motherwell	A	1–0		
34	26 April	Celtic	H	1–1		
35	29 April	Ayr United	H	0–2		
36	2 May	Dundee United	H	2–0		

==== Final League table ====
Pos	Team	Pld	W	D	L	GF	GA	GD	Pts	Qualification or relegation
6	Motherwell	36	13	7	16	45	52	−7	33	
7	Partick Thistle	36	14	5	17	52	62	−10	33	
8	St Mirren	36	11	8	17	52	63	−11	30	
9	Ayr United (R)	36	9	6	21	36	68	−32	24	Relegation to the 1978–79 Scottish First Division
10	Clydebank (R)	36	6	7	23	23	64	−41	19	Relegation to the 1978–79 Scottish First Division

Source: Statto
Rules for classification: 1) points; 2) goal difference; 3) number of goals scored.
(R) Relegated

=== Scottish League Cup ===
Round	Date	Opponent	H/A	Score	Clydebank Scorer(s)	Attendance
R1 L1	17 August	East Fife	A	5–0		
R1 L2	24 August	East Fife	H	1–0		
R2 L1	31 August	Stranraer	H	0–0		
R2 L2	3 September	Stranraer	A	1–2		
R3 L1	5 October	Dunfermline Athletic	A	0–2		
R3 L2	26 October	Dunfermline Athletic	H	2–2		

=== Scottish Cup ===
Round	Date	Opponent	H/A	Score	Clydebank Scorer(s)	Attendance
R3	7 February	Stirling Albion	A	0–3		

=== Anglo-Scottish Cup ===
Round	Date	Opponent	H/A	Score	Clydebank Scorer(s)	Attendance
R1 L1	22 September	Partick Thistle	A	0–3		
R1 L2	6 October	Partick Thistle	H	1–1		

== Sources ==
- Clydebank FC website
