= 1975–76 Clydebank F.C. season =

Clydebank F.C.
1974–75 season
- Manager: Bill Munro
- Scottish League Division Two: 1st
- Scottish Cup: 3rd Round
- Scottish League Cup: Group stage
- Spring Cup: Runners-up
Home colours

The 1975–76 season was Clydebank's tenth season after being elected to the Scottish Football League. They competed in the newly restructured Scottish League Division Two where they finished 1st and promoted to Division One. They also competed in the Scottish League Cup and Scottish Cup and finishing runners-up in the new Spring Cup which only took place that season.

== Results ==
=== Division 2 ===
Match Day	Date	Opponent	H/A	Score	Clydebank Scorer(s)	Attendance
1	30 August	Brechin City	H	3–0	Hall, Hay, Larnach	1,390
2	6 September	Stirling Albion	A	1–0	McCallan	1,397
3	13 September	Cowdenbeath	H	2–0	McCallan (2), Caskie	1,329
4	20 September	Stranraer	A	1–0	McCallan	1,203
5	27 September	Berwick Rangers	A	4–0	Larnach, Laing, Davidson, McCallan	351
6	4 October	Raith Rovers	H	1–1	Goodwin	1,413
7	11 October	Albion Rovers	A	4–0	Larnach (2), Goodwin, Cooper	739
8	18 October	Stenhousemuir	H	2–1	Cooper, McCallan	1,274
9	25 October	Queen's Park	H	1–1	Cooper	1,480
10	1 November	Brechin City	H	3–0	Hay (2), Cooper	1,481
11	8 November	Forfar Athletic	A	2–0	Larnach, Brash	812
12	15 November	Meadowbank Thistle	A	0–0		586
13	22 November	Alloa Athletic	H	3–1	Cooper (3 including 2 penalties)	1,612
14	29 November	Berwick Rangers	H	0–1		1,372
15	6 December	Raith Rovers	A	0–1		2,539
16	13 December	Meadowbank Thistle	H	2–0	McCallan (2)	1,160
17	20 December	Stenhousemuir	A	1–2	Cooper	431
18	27 December	Queen's Park	A	2–0	Cooper (2)	1,197
19	1 January	Stirling Albion	H	1–0	Cooper	1,332
20	3 January	Cowdenbeath	A	1–1	Larnach	962
21	31 January	Stranraer	H	2–1	McCallan, Browning	1,212
22	7 February	Brechin City	A	2–1	Cooper, McCallan	373
23	14 February	Albion Rovers	H	2–2	Lumsden, Cooper,	1,000
24	21 February	East Stirlingshire	A	1–0	McCallan	528
25	28 February	Forfar Athletic	H	2–0	Cooper (penalty), McCallan	1,700
26	6 April	Alloa Athletic	A	0–0		1,050

==== Final League table ====
Pos	Team	Pld	W	D	L	GF	GA	GD	Pts	Promotion
1	Clydebank (C, P)	26	17	6	3	46	15	+31	40	Promotion to the First Division
2	Raith Rovers (P)	26	15	10	1	45	22	+23	40	Promotion to the First Division
3	Alloa Athletic	26	14	7	5	48	32	+16	35	
4	Queen's Park	26	10	9	7	41	33	+8	29	
5	Cowdenbeath	26	11	7	8	44	43	+1	29	

Source: "1975-1976 Second Division - SPFL Archive". SPFL.
Rules for classification: 1) points; 2) goal difference; 3) number of goals scored.
(C) Champions; (P) Promoted

=== Scottish League Cup ===
==== Group 7 ====
Round	Date	Opponent	H/A	Score	Clydebank Scorer(s)	Attendance
1	9 August	Arbroath	A	0–4		1,817
2	13 August	Berwick Rangers	H	3–2	Cooper, McCallan, Larnach	1,201
3	16 August	East Stirlingshire	H	1–1	McCallan	1,325
4	20 August	Berwick Rangers	A	1–0	Larnach	412
5	23 August	East Stirlingshire	A	1–0	Simpson	1,022
6	28 August	Arbroath	H	1–0	Larnach	2,764

==== Group 7 Final Table ====
P	Team	Pld	W	D	L	GF	GA	GD	Pts
1	Clydebank	6	4	1	1	7	7	0	9
2	Arbroath	6	4	0	2	13	3	10	8
3	East Stirlingshire	6	1	2	3	6	12	−6	4
4	Berwick Rangers	6	1	1	4	6	10	−4	4

==== Knockout stage ====
Round	Date	Opponent	H/A	Score	Clydebank Scorer(s)	Attendance
SuppR L1	2 September	Cowdenbeath	A	2–0	Cooper, McCallan,	1,994
SuppR L2	3 September	Cowdenbeath	H	2–0	Larnach, McCallan	1,384
QF L1	10 September	Partick Thistle	A	0–4		5,646
QF L2	24 September	Partick Thistle	H	1–0	Abel	2,659

=== Scottish Cup ===
Round	Date	Opponent	H/A	Score	Clydebank Scorer(s)	Attendance
R2	10 January	Raith Rovers	A	1–3	Lumsden	3,899

=== Spring Cup ===
==== Group 6 ====
Round	Date	Opponent	H/A	Score	Clydebank Scorer(s)	Attendance
1	6 March	Clyde	A	3–1	Cooper (2 including 1 penalty), McCallan	800
2	13 March	Raith Rovers	H	1–2	Browning	
3	20 March	Queen of the South	H	4–0	McCallan, Cooper, Browning, McCall	2,000
4	27 March	Queen of the South	A	3–1	McCall, Browning, Provan	1,200
5	3 April	Clyde	H	3–0	Hall (2), Cooper	1,000
6	10 April	Raith Rovers	A	1–2	Cooper	2,000

==== Group 6 Final Table ====
P	Team	Pld	W	D	L	GF	GA	GD	Pts
1	Raith Rovers	6	4	1	1	12	9	3	9
2	Clydebank	6	4	0	2	15	6	9	8
3	Clyde	6	2	1	3	7	11	−4	5
4	Queen of the South	6	1	0	5	6	14	−8	2

==== Knockout stage ====
Round	Date	Opponent	H/A	Score	Clydebank Scorer(s)	Attendance
R2 L1	14 April	Albion Rovers	H	4–1	Lumsden (2), Cooper (penalty), McCallan	
R2 L2	17 April	Albion Rovers	A	0–2		600
QF L1	21 April	East Fife	H	1–0	Cooper	2,900
QF L2	24 April	East Fife	A	0–1 (Clydebank won 4–2 on penalties)		2,257
SF	28 April	Dumbarton	H	3–1	McCallan (2), Hall	3,800
F	3 May	Airdrieonians	N	2–4 (aet)	Larnach (2)	8,000
