= 1973–74 Clydebank F.C. season =

Clydebank F.C.
1973–74 season
- Manager: Jack Steedman
- Scottish League Division Two: 10th
- Scottish Cup: 3rd Round
- Scottish League Cup: Group stage
Home colours

The 1973–74 season was Clydebank's eighth season after being elected to the Scottish Football League. They competed in the Scottish League Division Two where they finished 10th in the table, Scottish League Cup and Scottish Cup.

== Results ==
=== Division 2 ===
Match Day	Date	Opponent	H/A	Score	Clydebank Scorer(s)	Attendance
1	1 September	Kilmarnock	A	2–3	White (2)	2,500
2	8 September	East Stirlingshire	H	1–3	Provan	500
3	15 September	Forfar Athletic	A	2–0	Roxburgh, Henderson	598
4	19 September	Stirling Albion	H	2–0	Larnach, White	1,000
5	22 September	Raith Rovers	H	1–1	Jim Thomson	500
6	29 September	Stenhousemuir	A	2–1	Roxburgh (2)	500
7	6 October	Stranraer	H	5–0	Jim Thomson (3), Fallon (2 penalties)	500
8	13 October	Brechin City	A	1–0	Jim Thomson	350
9	20 October	Albion Rovers	H	0–1		500
10	27 October	Hamilton Academical	H	1–1	?	1,000
11	10 November	Alloa Athletic	H	1–2	White	500
12	17 November	Queen's Park	A	1–2	Jim Thomson	903
13	24 November	Berwick Rangers	A	0–0		600
14	22 December	Airdrieonians	A	1–4	McCallan	2,000
15	29 December	Kilmarnock	H	1–2	Law	1,200
16	1 January	East Stirlingshire	A	0–2		500
17	19 January	Stenhousemuir	H	1–1	Henderson	350
18	2 February	Stranraer	A	0–1		1,100
19	9 February	Brechin City	H	2–0		400
20	16 February	Forfar Athletic	H	3–3	Fallon (penalty), Harry Bell, White	400
21	24 February	Albion Rovers	A	0–3		500
22	3 March	Hamilton Academical	A	0–3		4,500
23	9 March	Montrose	H	3–0	Joe Hughes (2), Roxburgh	800
24	23 March	Queen's Park	H	2–0	Fallon, McGovern	1,000
25	27 March	St Mirren	A	0–2		1,300
26	30 March	Berwick Rangers	H	1–2	Joe Hughes	250
27	3 April	Montrose	A	3–1	Joe Hughes (2), McCallan	500
28	6 April	Cowdenbeath	A	2–0	McGovern, Joe Hughes	500
29	9 April	Stirling Albion	A	0–3		400
30	13 April	St Mirren	H	1–1	Joe Hughes	700
31	17 April	Queen of the South	H	0–1		500
32	20 April	Queen of the South	A	1–0	Joe Hughes	1,700
33	24 April	Cowdenbeath	H	2–2	McGovern, McCallan	300
34	27 April	Airdrieonians	H	2–1	Roxburgh, White	1,250
35	29 April	Alloa Athletic	H	1–0	McGarry	200
36	1 May	Raith Rovers	A	2–2	McGovern (2)	900

==== Final League table ====
P	Team	Pld	W	D	L	GF	GA	GD	Pts
9	Stranraer	36	14	8	14	64	70	−6	36
10	Clydebank	36	13	8	15	47	48	−1	34
11	St Mirren	36	12	10	14	62	66	−4	34

=== Scottish League Cup ===
==== Group 9 ====
Round	Date	Opponent	H/A	Score	Clydebank Scorer(s)	Attendance
1	15 August	Albion Rovers	A	1–3	McColl	500
2	18 August	Stranraer	H	3–0	Fallon (penalty), ??	600
3	22 August	Forfar Athletic	A	0–1		500
4	25 August	Brechin City	A	2–2	Roxburgh, Hall	400

==== Group 9 Final Table ====
P	Team	Pld	W	D	L	GF	GA	GD	Pts
1	Albion Rovers	4	2	1	1	8	7	1	5
2	Forfar Athletic	4	2	1	1	4	3	1	5
3	Stranraer	4	2	0	2	7	6	1	4
4	Clydebank	4	1	1	2	6	6	0	3
5	Brechin City	4	1	1	2	5	8	–3	3

=== Scottish Cup ===
Round	Date	Opponent	H/A	Score	Clydebank Scorer(s)	Attendance
R1	24 December	East Stirlingshire	A	0–0		400
R1 R	25 December	East Stirlingshire	H	1–0	Fallon	133
R2	5 January	Clachnacuddin	A	1–1	Fallon (penalty)	1,850
R2 R	12 January	Clachnacuddin	H	3–2	Roxburgh, White	571
R3	27 January	Celtic	A	6–1	Fallon (penalty)	28,000
