= 1994–95 Clydebank F.C. season =

Clydebank F.C.
1994–95 season
- Manager: Brian Wright
- Scottish League First Division: 8th
- Scottish Cup: 3rd Round
- Scottish League Cup: 2nd Round
- Scottish Challenge Cup: Semi-finalists
Home colours

The 1994–95 season was Clydebank's twenty-ninth season in the Scottish Football League. They competed in the Scottish First Division and finished eighth They also competed in the Scottish League Cup, Scottish Challenge Cup and Scottish Cup.

== Results ==
=== Division 1 ===
Round	Date	Opponent	H/A	Score	Clydebank Scorer(s)	Attendance
1	13 August	Stranraer	H	2–0		
2	20 August	Dunfermline Athletic	H	0–1		
3	27 August	St Mirren	A	1–2		
4	3 September	Raith Rovers	A	1–1		
5	10 September	Dundee	H	5–2		
6	24 September	Airdrieonians	A	0–2		
7	1 October	St Johnstone	H	0–0		
8	8 October	Ayr United	H	3–0		
9	15 October	Hamilton Academical	A	0–0		
10	22 October	Stranraer	A	1–0		
11	29 October	St Mirren	H	1–1		
12	5 November	Dunfermline Athletic	A	1–4		
13	12 November	Dundee	A	0–2		
14	19 November	Raith Rovers	H	0–3		
15	26 November	Airdrieonians	H	0–1		
16	3 December	St Johnstone	A	1–1		
17	26 December	Ayr United	A	1–1		
18	31 December	Stranraer	H	2–3		
19	2 January	St Mirren	A	0–0		
20	7 January	Dunfermline Athletic	H	1–2		
21	10 January	Hamilton Academical	H	0–0		
22	14 January	Raith Rovers	A	0–1		
23	21 January	Dundee	H	0–3		
24	4 February	St Johnstone	H	0–0		
25	14 February	Airdrieonians	A	2–1		
26	25 February	Hamilton Academical	A	1–0		
27	11 March	Ayr United	H	1–1		
28	18 March	Dundee	A	2–3		
29	1 April	St Johnstone	A	0–1		
30	4 April	Raith Rovers	H	1–2		
31	11 April	Airdrieonians	H	1–1		
32	15 April	Ayr United	A	0–1		
33	22 April	Hamilton Academical	H	1–4		
34	29 April	Stranraer	A	1–0		
35	6 May	St Mirren	H	2–1		
36	13 May	Dunfermline Athletic	A	1–2		

==== Final League table ====
Pos	Team	Pld	W	D	L	GF	GA	GD	Pts	Promotion or relegation
6	Hamilton Academical	36	14	7	15	42	48	−6	49	
7	St Mirren	36	8	12	16	34	50	−16	36	
8	Clydebank	36	8	11	17	33	47	−14	35	
9	Ayr United (R)	36	6	11	19	31	58	−27	29	Relegation to the Second Division
10	Stranraer (R)	36	4	5	27	25	81	−56	17	Relegation to the Second Division

Source: RSSSF and statto
Rules for classification: 1) points; 2) goal difference; 3) number of goals scored.
(R) Relegated

=== Scottish League Cup ===
Round	Date	Opponent	H/A	Score	Clydebank Scorer(s)	Attendance
R2	10 August	Motherwell	A	1–3		

=== Scottish Challenge Cup ===
Round	Date	Opponent	H/A	Score	Clydebank Scorer(s)	Attendance
R1	16 September	Queen's Park	A	5–0		
R2	27 September	Alloa Athletic	A	3–1		
QF	5 October	Montrose	A	2–1		
SF	18 October	Airdrieonians	A	0–3		

=== Scottish Cup ===
Round	Date	Opponent	H/A	Score	Clydebank Scorer(s)	Attendance
R3	29 January	Heart of Midlothian	H	1–1		
R3 R	9 February	Heart of Midlothian	A	1–2		
