= 1987–88 Clydebank F.C. season =

Clydebank F.C.
1987–88 season
- Manager: Sammy Henderson
- Scottish League First Division: 3rd
- Scottish Cup: 4th Round
- Scottish League Cup: 2nd Round

The 1987–88 season was Clydebank's twenty-second season in the Scottish Football League. They competed in the Scottish First Division and finished 3rd. They also competed in the Scottish League Cup and Scottish Cup.

== Results ==
=== Division 1 ===
Match Day	Date	Opponent	H/A	Score	Clydebank Scorer(s)	Attendance
1	8 August	Queen of the South	H	1–1		
2	11 August	Hamilton Academical	A	2–3		
3	15 August	Forfar Athletic	A	0–3		
4	22 August	Partick Thistle	H	0–2		
5	29 August	Dumbarton	A	1–1		
6	5 September	Airdrieonians	H	2–3		
7	12 September	Clyde	A	1–5		
8	15 September	Kilmarnock	H	2–0		
9	19 September	Raith Rovers	H	1–2		
10	26 September	Meadowbank Thistle	A	0–0		
11	29 September	East Fife	H	2–1		
12	3 October	Partick Thistle	A	1–0		
13	6 October	Hamilton Academical	H	0–2		
14	10 October	Queen of the South	A	0–2		
15	17 October	Clyde	H	2–0		
16	20 October	Kilmarnock	A	3–1		
17	24 October	Forfar Athletic	H	1–0		
18	28 October	East Fife	A	2–1		
19	31 October	Airdrieonains	A	2–0		
20	7 November	Dumbarton	H	3–1		
21	14 November	Raith Rovers	A	0–1		
22	21 November	Meadowbank Thistle	H	2–1		
23	28 November	Partick Thistle	H	0–3		
24	5 December	Hamilton Academical	A	4–0		
25	12 December	Clyde	A	1–0		
26	19 December	Kilmarnock	H	1–0		
27	26 December	Airdrieonians	H	1–1		
28	2 January	Dumbarton	A	3–1		
29	9 January	Raith Rovers	H	3–1		
30	16 January	Meadowbank Thistle	A	2–3		
31	27 January	Forfar Athletic	H	2–2		
32	6 February	Queen of the South	H	1–0		
33	27 February	Partick Thistle	A	0–3		
34	1 March	East Fife	H	2–0		
35	5 March	Clyde	H	1–2		
36	12 March	Kilmarnock	A	2–2		
37	19 March	Airdireonians	A	0–1		
38	26 March	Dumbarton	H	1–0		
39	2 April	Queen of the South	A	1–0		
40	9 April	Forfar Athletic	H	3–2		
41	16 April	Meadowbank Thislte	H	0–2		
42	23 April	Raith Rovers	A	2–3		
43	30 April	Hamilton Academical	H	3–1		
44	7 May	East Fife	A	1–1		

==== Final League table ====
Pos	Team	Pld	W	D	L	GF	GA	GD	Pts	Promotion or relegation
1	Hamilton Academical (C, P)	44	22	12	10	67	39	+28	56	Promotion to the Premier Division
2	Meadowbank Thistle	44	20	12	12	71	37	+34	52	
3	Clydebank	44	21	7	16	59	61	−2	49	
4	Forfar Athletic	44	16	16	12	67	58	+9	48	
5	Raith Rovers	44	19	7	18	81	76	+5	45	

Source: RSSSF and statto
Rules for classification: 1) points; 2) goal difference; 3) number of goals scored.
(C) Champions; (P) Promoted

=== Scottish League Cup ===
Round	Date	Opponent	H/A	Score	Clydebank Scorer(s)	Attendance
R2	19 August	Raith Rovers	A	1–2		

=== Scottish Cup ===
Round	Date	Opponent	H/A	Score	Clydebank Scorer(s)	Attendance
R3	30 January	St Mirren	A	3–0		
R4	20 February	Partick Thistle	H	2–2		
R4 R	23 February	Partick Thistle	A	1–4		
