= 1972–73 Clydebank F.C. season =

Clydebank F.C.
1972–73 season
- Manager: Jack Steedman
- Scottish League Division Two: 17th
- Scottish Cup: 1st Round
- Scottish League Cup: Group stage
Home colours

The 1972–73 season was Clydebank's seventh season in the Scottish Football League. They competed in the Scottish League Division Two where they finished 17th in the table, Scottish League Cup and Scottish Cup.

== Results ==
=== Division 2 ===
Match Day	Date	Opponent	H/A	Score	Clydebank Scorer(s)	Attendance
1	2 September	Stirling Albion	H	0–3		1,600
2	6 September	Brechin City	A	1–3		300
3	9 September	East Stirlingshire	A	2–4	Caskie, ?	360
4	13 September	Stenhousemuir	H	1–2		350
5	16 September	Raith Rovers	H	1–1	Currie	400
6	20 September	Stirling Albion	A	0–3		400
7	23 September	Hamilton Academical	A	4–1	Larnach (2)?	1,200
8	27 September	Brechin City	H	2–1		350
9	30 September	Cowdenbeath	A	0–2		1,100
10	7 October	Forfar Athletic	H	4–1	Roxburgh (2), ?	1,100
11	14 October	Montrose	A	3–1	Law, ?	950
12	21 October	Queen of the South	H	1–0	Larnach	580
13	28 October	Albion Rovers	A	1–4	?	500
14	4 November	Alloa Athletic	H	2–3	Caskie, Delaney	1,000
15	11 November	Berwick Rangers	H	1–2	Caskie	500
16	18 November	St Mirren	A	0–4		3,123
17	25 November	Queen's Park	H	1–2	Harvey	1,000
18	2 December	Stranraer	A	0–4		630
19	1 January	East Stirlingshire	H	1–1	Larnach	500
20	13 January	Dunfermline Athletic	H	0–4		1,000
21	27 January	Forfar Athletic	A	3–0	Larnach (3)	750
22	3 February	Stenhousemuir	A	1–1	Harvey	500
23	10 February	Montrose	H	0–4		650
24	24 February	Clyde	H	0–1		1,100
25	28 February	Raith Rovers	A	0–2		1,800
26	3 March	Albion Rovers	H	1–2	McCallan	250
27	10 March	Alloa Athletic	A	4–2	Bell (2), Larnach, McCallan	500
28	17 March	Berwick Rangers	A	0–1		400
29	24 March	St Mirren	H	1–1	Larnach	800
30	31 March	Queen's Park	A	2–2	McCallan, Larnach	893
31	7 April	Stranraer	H	4–2	Larnach (2), McCallan, Roxburgh	650
32	11 April	Queen of the South	A	0–2		700
33	18 April	Cowdenbeath	H	3–0	Law, McColl, McCallan	500
34	21 April	Clyde	H	0–1		4,000
35	25 April	Hamilton Academical	H	1–2	McColl	300
36	28 April	Dunfermline Athletic	A	3–3	Larnach, Law, McCallan	

==== Final League table ====
P	Team	Pld	W	D	L	GF	GA	GD	Pts
16	Forfar Athletic	36	10	9	17	38	66	−28	29*
17	Clydebank	36	9	6	21	48	72	−24	24
18	Albion Rovers	36	5	8	23	35	83	−48	18

=== Scottish League Cup ===
==== Group 3 ====
Round	Date	Opponent	H/A	Score	Clydebank Scorer(s)	Attendance
1	12 August	Rangers	A	0–2		26,240
2	16 August	Ayr United	H	1–0		1,200
3	19 August	St Mirren	A	2–4	Munro, Love	3,500
4	23 August	Ayr United	A	0–5		4,000
3	26 August	Rangers	H	0–5		9,000
4	30 August	St Mirren	H	3–3		1,000

==== Group 3 Final Table ====
P	Team	Pld	W	D	L	GF	GA	GD	Pts
1	Rangers	6	5	0	1	16	6	10	10
2	Ayr United	6	3	0	3	12	6	6	6
3	St Mirren	6	2	1	3	12	15	–3	5
4	Clydebank	6	1	1	4	6	19	–13	3

=== Scottish Cup ===
Round	Date	Opponent	H/A	Score	Clydebank Scorer(s)	Attendance
R3	16 December	Brechin City	H	0–0		293
R3 R	23 December	Brechin City	A	1–2	Harvey	403
