= 1980–81 Clydebank F.C. season =

Clydebank F.C.
1980–81 season
- Manager: Bill Munro
- Scottish League Division One: 10th
- Scottish Cup: Quarter-finalists
- Scottish League Cup: Quarter-finalists

The 1980–81 season was Clydebank's fifteenth season after being elected to the Scottish Football League. They competed in Scottish League Division One where they finished 10th. They also competed in the Scottish League Cup and Scottish Cup.

== Results ==
=== Division 1 ===
Match Day	Date	Opponent	H/A	Score	Clydebank Scorer(s)	Attendance
1	9 August	East Stirlingshire	H	3–2		
2	16 August	Raith Rovers	A	4–0		
3	23 August	Dumbarton	H	1–4		
4	6 September	Dundee	H	3–0		
5	9 September	Motherwell	H	2–2		
6	13 September	Falkirk	A	2–3		
7	17 September	St Johnstone	A	1–1		
8	20 September	Ayr United	H	2–2		
9	27 September	Hibernian	A	1–4		
10	1 October	Stirling Albion	A	0–0		
11	4 October	Hamilton Academical	H	3–1		
12	11 October	Berwick Rangers	H	2–1		
13	18 October	Dunfermline Athletic	A	1–3		
14	25 October	Falkirk	H	2–1		
15	1 November	Dundee	A	1–2		
16	8 November	St Johnstone	H	0–2		
17	15 November	Ayr United	A	0–1		
18	22 November	Hibernian	H	1–1		
19	29 November	Hamilton Academical	A	0–3		
20	6 December	Berwick Rangers	A	1–0		
21	13 December	Dunfermline Athletic	H	2–3		
22	20 December	Motherwell	A	0–3		
23	1 January	Dumbarton	A	1–1		
24	3 January	Stirling Albion	H	1–1		
25	31 January	Falkirk	A	0–0		
26	21 February	Ayr United	A	1–4		
27	28 February	Hamilton Academical	H	1–2		
28	21 March	Motherwell	H	0–0		
29	24 March	St Johnstone	H	1–3		
30	28 March	Stirling Albion	A	0–0		
31	1 April	Dunfermline Athletic	A	1–2		
32	4 April	Raith Rovers	A	1–1		
33	11 April	Berwick Rangers	H	2–0		
34	15 April	Hibernian	A	0–3		
35	18 April	Dundee	A	0–1		
36	22 April	Raith Rovers	H	3–0		
37	25 April	East Stirlingshire	H	2–0		
38	29 April	East Stirlingshire	A	2–2		
39	2 May	Dumbarton	H	0–0		

==== Final League table ====
Pos	Team	Pld	W	D	L	GF	GA	GD	Pts
8	Dumbarton	39	13	11	15	49	50	−1	37
9	Falkirk	39	13	8	18	39	52	−13	34
10	Clydebank	39	10	13	16	48	59	−11	33
11	East Stirlingshire	39	6	16	17	39	57	−18	28
12	Dunfermline Athletic	39	10	7	22	41	58	−17	27

Source: RSSSF
Rules for classification: 1) points; 2) goal difference; 3) number of goals scored.

=== Scottish League Cup ===
Round	Date	Opponent	H/A	Score	Clydebank Scorer(s)	Attendance
R1 L1	13 August	St Johnstone	A	2–0		
R1 L2	20 August	St Johnstone	H	0–0		
R2 L1	27 August	Meadowbank Thistle	A	2–1		
R2 L2	30 August	Meadowbank Thistle	H	2–1		
R3 L1	3 September	Raith Rovers	A	1–0		
R3 L2	24 September	Raith Rovers	H	1–0		
QF L1	8 October	Dundee United	H	2–1		
QF L2	29 October	Dundee United	A	1–4		

=== Scottish Cup ===
Round	Date	Opponent	H/A	Score	Clydebank Scorer(s)	Attendance
R3	24 January	East Fife	A	0–0		
R3 R	28 January	East Fife	H	5–4		
R4	14 February	Kilmarnock	A	0–0		
R4 R	18 February	Kilmarnock	H	1–1		
R4 2R	23 February	Kilmarnock	A	1–0		
R5	11 March	Morton	A	0–0		
R5 R	16 March	Morton	H	0–6		
