= 1991–92 Clydebank F.C. season =

Clydebank F.C.
1991–92 season
- Manager: Jim Fallon
- Scottish League First Division: 9th
- Scottish Cup: 4th Round
- Scottish League Cup: 2nd Round
- Scottish Challenge Cup: 2nd Round
Home colours

The 1991–92 season was Clydebank's twenty-sixth season in the Scottish Football League. They competed in the Scottish First Division and finished 9th. They also competed in the Scottish League Cup, Scottish Challenge Cup and Scottish Cup.

== Results ==
=== Division 1 ===
Match Day	Date	Opponent	H/A	Score	Clydebank Scorer(s)	Attendance
1	10 August	Dundee	H	1–2		
2	13 August	Raith Rovers	H	0–2		
3	17 August	Ayr United	A	0–3		
4	24 August	Montrose	H	4–1		
5	31 August	Morton	A	7–1		
6	7 September	Kilmarnock	H	1–1		
7	14 September	Forfar Athletic	A	1–2		
8	21 September	Hamilton Academcial	A	0–0		
9	28 September	Stirling Albion	H	0–1		
10	5 October	Meadowbank Thistle	H	1–1		
11	8 October	Partick Thistle	A	3–0		
12	12 October	Dundee	A	0–4		
13	19 October	Ayr United	H	3–2		
14	26 October	Kilmarnock	A	1–2		
15	29 October	Forfar Athletic	H	3–3		
16	2 November	Morton	H	3–1		
17	9 November	Montrose	A	3–1		
18	16 November	Meadowbank Thistle	A	1–1		
19	19 November	Partick Thistle	H	0–0		
20	23 November	Hamilton Academical	H	1–1		
21	30 November	Raith Rovers	A	0–4		
22	3 December	Stirling Albion	A	0–3		
23	7 December	Dundee	H	2–2		
24	14 December	Kilmarnock	H	0–3		
25	28 December	Montrose	H	4–2		
26	4 January	Meadowbank Thistle	H	1–1		
27	7 January	Forfar Athletic	A	3–1		
28	11 January	Partick Thistle	A	1–2		
29	14 January	Morton	A	0–5		
30	18 January	Raith Rovers	H	1–1		
31	1 February	Ayr United	A	1–3		
32	8 February	Hamilton Academical	A	3–2		
33	26 February	Stirling Albion	H	2–1		
34	29 February	Medowbank Thistle	A	0–2		
35	10 March	Partick Thistle	H	0–2		
36	14 March	Montrose	A	2–2		
37	21 March	Morton	H	2–3		
38	28 March	Dundee	A	0–3		
39	4 April	Ayr United	H	1–0		
40	7 April	Kilmarnock	A	0–1		
41	11 April	Forfar Athletic	H	2–0		
42	18 April	Hamilton Academical	H	1–3		
43	25 April	Raith Rovers	A	0–0		
44	2 May	Stirling Albion	A	0–2		

==== Final League table ====
Pos	Team	Pld	W	D	L	GF	GA	GD	Pts	Promotion or relegation
7	Morton	44	17	12	15	66	59	+7	46	
8	Stirling Albion	44	14	13	17	50	57	−7	41	
9	Clydebank	44	12	12	20	59	77	−18	36	
10	Meadowbank Thistle	44	7	16	21	37	59	−22	30	
11	Montrose (R)	44	5	17	22	45	85	−40	27	Relegation to the Second Division

Source: RSSSF and statto
Rules for classification: 1) points; 2) goal difference; 3) number of goals scored.
(R) Relegated

=== Scottish League Cup ===
Round	Date	Opponent	H/A	Score	Clydebank Scorer(s)	Attendance
R2	20 August	Heart of Midlothian	A	0–3		

=== Scottish Challenge Cup ===
Round	Date	Opponent	H/A	Score	Clydebank Scorer(s)	Attendance
R1	1 October	Clyde	H	4–0		
R2	15 October	Raith Rovers	H	1–1 (Raith win on penalties)		

=== Scottish Cup ===
Round	Date	Opponent	H/A	Score	Clydebank Scorer(s)	Attendance
R3	25 January	Cowdenbeath	H	3–1		
R4	15 February	Hibernian	H	1–5		
