= 1976–77 Clydebank F.C. season =

Clydebank F.C.
1976–77 season
- Manager: Bill Munro
- Scottish League Division One: 2nd (Promoted)
- Scottish Cup: 4th Round
- Scottish League Cup: Quarter-finalists
- Anglo-Scottish Cup: 1st Round (Scottish stage)

The 1976–77 season was Clydebank's eleventh season after being elected to the Scottish Football League. They competed in Scottish League Division One where they finished 2nd behind St Mirren and entering promotion to the Premier League at the first attempt. They also competed in the Scottish League Cup, Scottish Cup and Anglo-Scottish Cup.

== Results ==
=== Division 1 ===
Match Day	Date	Opponent	H/A	Score	Clydebank Scorer(s)	Attendance
1	4 September	Arbroath	H	3–0		
2	7 September	Raith Rovers	A	3–0		
3	11 September	Airdrieonians	A	1–1		
4	15 September	Queen of the South	A	2–1		
5	18 September	St Johnstone	H	1–0		
6	25 September	Montrose	A	2–2		
7	29 September	Falkirk	H	4–1		
8	2 October	East Fife	H	2–1		
9	9 October	Hamilton Academical	A	2–3		
10	12 October	Falkirk	A	4–0		
11	16 October	Dundee	H	2–1		
12	23 October	St Mirren	A	0–0		
13	27 October	Morton	A	0–0		
14	30 October	Dumbarton	H	2–0		
15	6 November	Arbroath	A	2–0		
16	13 November	Airdireonians	H	1–0		
17	20 November	St Johnstone	H	0–0		
18	27 November	Montrose	H	1–2		
19	4 December	East Fife	A	6–0		
20	25 December	St Mirren	H	2–2		
21	1 January	Dumbarton	A	1–1		
22	3 January	Arbroath	H	8–1		
23	22 January	Montrose	A	3–3		
24	5 February	East Fife	H	3–1		
25	12 February	Hamilton Academical	A	2–0		
26	16 February	St Johnstone	H	2–0		
27	19 February	Dundee	H	3–0		
28	2 March	Airdrieonians	A	2–0		
29	5 March	St Mirren	A	1–3		
30	7 March	Hamilton Academical	H	2–0		
31	12 March	Dumbarton	H	4–2		
32	19 March	Queen of the South	A	2–2		
33	26 March	Queen of the South	H	2–0		
34	2 April	Morton	H	2–3		
35	9 April	Morton	A	2–2		
36	12 April	Dundee	A	3–2		
37	16 April	Raith Rovers	A	1–2		
38	23 April	Raith Rovers	H	2–0		
39	30 April	Falkirk	A	4–2		

==== Final League table ====
Pos	Team	Pld	W	D	L	GF	GA	GD	Pts	Promotion or relegation
1	St Mirren (C, P)	39	25	12	2	91	38	+53	62	Promotion to the Premier Division
2	Clydebank (P)	39	24	10	5	89	38	+51	58	Promotion to the Premier Division
3	Dundee	39	21	9	9	90	55	+35	51	
4	Morton	39	20	10	9	77	52	+25	50	
5	Montrose	39	16	9	14	61	62	−1	41	

Source: RSSSF and statto
Rules for classification: 1) points; 2) goal difference; 3) number of goals scored.
(C) Champions; (P) Promoted

=== Scottish League Cup ===
==== Group 8 ====
Round	Date	Opponent	H/A	Score	Clydebank Scorer(s)	Attendance
1	14 August	Alloa Athletic	A	0–1		
2	18 August	Queen of the South	H	1–0		
3	21 August	Dunfermline Athletic	A	1–0		
4	25 August	Queen of the South	A	4–1		
5	28 August	Dunfermline Athletic	H	2–0		
6	1 September	Alloa Athletic	H	1–0		

==== Group 8 Final Table ====
P	Team	Pld	W	D	L	GF	GA	GD	Pts
1	Clydebank	6	5	0	1	9	2	7	10
2	Alloa Athletic	6	3	1	2	8	6	2	7
3	Queen of the South	6	1	2	3	4	8	−4	4
4	Dunfermline Athletic	6	1	1	4	3	8	−5	3

==== Knockout stage ====
Round	Date	Opponent	H/A	Score	Clydebank Scorer(s)	Attendance
QF L1	22 September	Rangers	A	3–3		
QF L2	6 October	Rangers	H	1–1		
QF R	18 October	Rangers	A	0–0		
QF 2R	19 October	Rangers	N	1–2		

=== Scottish Cup ===
Round	Date	Opponent	H/A	Score	Clydebank Scorer(s)	Attendance
R1	22 December	Cowdenbeath	A	4–3		
R2	8 January	Selkirk	H	2–0		
R3	2 February	Hamilton Academical	A	0–0		
R3 R	7 February	Hamilton Academical	H	3–0		
R4	26 February	Heart of Midlothian	A	0–1		

=== Anglo-Scottish Cup ===
Round	Date	Opponent	H/A	Score	Clydebank Scorer(s)	Attendance
R1 L1	22 September	Ayr United	A	0–0		
R1 L2	6 October	Ayr United	H	0–1		
