= 1993–94 Clydebank F.C. season =

Clydebank F.C.
1993–94 season
- Manager: Brian Wright
- Scottish League First Division: 5th
- Scottish Cup: 3rd Round
- Scottish League Cup: 2nd Round
- Scottish Challenge Cup: 3rd Round
Home colours

The 1993–94 season was Clydebank's twenty-eighth season in the Scottish Football League. They competed in the Scottish First Division and finished 7th. They also competed in the Scottish League Cup, Scottish Challenge Cup and Scottish Cup.

== Results ==
=== Division 1 ===
Match Day	Date	Opponent	H/A	Score	Clydebank Scorer(s)	Attendance
1	7 August	Ayr United	H	1–0		
2	14 August	Dunfermline Athletic	A	2–0		
3	21 August	Dumbarton	A	4–2		
4	28 August	Clyde	H	2–1		
5	4 September	Falkirk	A	4–0		
6	11 September	Morton	H	3–0		
7	15 September	Hamilton Academical	A	3–2		
8	18 September	Brechin City	A	0–1		
9	25 September	Airdrieonians	H	1–2		
10	28 September	Stirling Albion	A	3–0		
11	2 October	St Mirren	H	1–1		
12	9 October	Ayr United	A	1–1		
13	16 October	Hamilton Academical	H	2–2		
14	23 October	Morton	A	0–0		
15	30 October	Dumbarton	H	2–1		
16	6 November	Clyde	A	1–1		
17	9 November	Falkirk	H	1–1		
18	13 November	St Mirren	A	0–1		
19	20 November	Stirling Albion	H	2–1		
20	30 November	Airdrieonians	A	1–2		
21	4 December	Brechin City	H	3–2		
22	11 December	Dunfermline Athletic	H	0–3		
23	18 December	Hamilton Academical	A	0–1		
24	4 January	Ayr United	H	0–2		
25	8 January	Clyde	H	0–2		
26	15 January	Falkirk	A	0–0		
27	18 January	Dumbarton	A	2–2		
28	22 January	Dunfermline Athletic	A	0–2		
29	5 February	Morton	H	0–0		
30	12 February	St Mirren	H	0–3		
31	26 February	Stirling Albion	A	2–1		
32	5 March	Brechin City	A	1–0		
33	19 March	Hamilton Academical	H	3–2		
34	22 March	Airdrieonians	H	2–1		
35	26 March	Ayr United	A	0–0		
36	29 March	Dunfermline Athletic	H	0–1		
37	2 April	Morton	A	1–1		
38	9 April	St Mirren	A	0–2		
39	16 April	Stirling Albion	H	2–1		
40	23 April	Brechin City	H	2–1		
41	26 April	Airdrieonians	A	0–0		
42	30 April	Dumbarton	A	2–0		
43	7 May	Clyde	A	1–1		
44	14 May	Falkirk	H	1–1		

==== Final League table ====
Pos	Team	Pld	W	D	L	GF	GA	GD	Pts
3	Airdrieonians	44	20	14	10	58	38	+20	54
4	Hamilton Academical	44	19	12	13	66	54	+12	50
5	Clydebank	44	18	14	12	56	48	+8	50
6	St Mirren	44	21	8	15	42	48	−6	50
7	Ayr United	44	14	14	16	42	52	−10	42

Source: RSSSF and statto
Rules for classification: 1) points; 2) goal difference; 3) number of goals scored.

=== Scottish League Cup ===
Round	Date	Opponent	H/A	Score	Clydebank Scorer(s)	Attendance
R2	10 August	Aberdeen	A	0–5		

=== Scottish Challenge Cup ===
Round	Date	Opponent	H/A	Score	Clydebank Scorer(s)	Attendance
R1	7 October	Stenhousemuir	A	5–0		
R2	19 October	Queen's Park	A	1–0		
R1	26 October	Ayr United	A	0–2		

=== Scottish Cup ===
Round	Date	Opponent	H/A	Score	Clydebank Scorer(s)	Attendance
R3	29 January	Dundee	H	1–1		
R3 R	9 February	Dundee	A	1–2		
