= 1992–93 Clydebank F.C. season =

Clydebank F.C.
1992–93 season
- Manager: Jim Fallon
- Scottish League First Division: 7th
- Scottish Cup: Quarter-final
- Scottish League Cup: 2nd Round
- Scottish Challenge Cup: 1st Round
Home colours

The 1992–93 season was Clydebank's twenty-seventh season in the Scottish Football League. They competed in the Scottish First Division and finished 7th. They also competed in the Scottish League Cup, Scottish Challenge Cup and Scottish Cup.

== Results ==
=== Division 1 ===
Match Day	Date	Opponent	H/A	Score	Clydebank Scorer(s)	Attendance
1	1 August	Cowdenbeath	A	3–3		
2	4 August	Morton	A	5–1		
3	8 August	Ayr United	H	1–1		
4	15 August	St Mirren	A	0–0		
5	22 August	Dumbarton	H	0–1		
6	29 August	Dunfermline Athletic	A	3–1		
7	5 September	Kilmarnock	H	1–1		
8	12 September	Meadowbank Thistle	A	0–1		
9	19 September	Stirling Albion	H	4–1		
10	26 September	Hamilton Academical	H	3–1		
11	3 October	Raith Rovers	A	2–2		
12	10 October	Cowdenbeath	H	4–1		
13	17 October	Ayr United	A	1–2		
14	24 October	Kilmarnock	A	3–3		
15	31 October	Dunfermline Athletic	H	1–0		
16	7 November	St Mirren	H	1–2		
17	14 November	Dumbarton	A	1–3		
18	21 November	Stirling Albion	A	1–0		
19	28 November	Meadowbank Thistle	H	0–0		
20	1 December	Raith Rovers	H	3–0		
21	8 December	Hamilton Academical	A	0–2		
22	12 December	Cowdenbeath	A	3–1		
23	19 December	Morton	H	2–2		
24	26 December	St Mirren	A	2–3		
25	2 January	Dumbarton	H	3–1		
26	26 January	Raith Rovers	A	2–2		
27	30 January	Ayr United	H	1–1		
28	2 February	Dunfermline Athletic	A	0–2		
29	13 February	Morton	A	0–2		
30	16 February	Kilmarnock	H	2–0		
31	20 February	Hamilton Academical	H	0–1		
32	27 February	Stirling Albion	H	1–1		
33	9 March	Cowdenbeath	H	5–0		
34	13 March	Ayr United	A	0–0		
35	20 March	Dumbarton	A	0–2		
36	27 March	St Mirren	A	0–3		
37	31 March	Meadowbank Thistle	A	1–0		
38	3 April	Kilmarnock	A	0–6		
39	10 April	Dunfermline Athletic	H	1–1		
40	17 April	Meadowbank Thistle	H	3–1		
41	24 April	Stirling Albion	A	3–2		
42	1 May	Morton	H	2–2		
43	8 May	Hamilton Academical	A	1–2		
44	15 May	Raith Rovers	H	4–1		

==== Final League table ====
Pos	Team	Pld	W	D	L	GF	GA	GD	Pts
6	Morton	44	19	10	15	65	56	+9	48
7	Ayr United	44	14	18	12	49	44	+5	46
8	Clydebank	44	16	13	15	71	66	+5	45
9	Dumbarton	44	15	7	22	56	71	−15	37
10	Stirling Albion	44	11	13	20	44	61	−17	35

Source: RSSSF and statto
Rules for classification: 1) points; 2) goal difference; 3) number of goals scored.

=== Scottish League Cup ===
Round	Date	Opponent	H/A	Score	Clydebank Scorer(s)	Attendance
R2	12 August	Heart of Midlothian	A	0–1		

=== Scottish Challenge Cup ===
Round	Date	Opponent	H/A	Score	Clydebank Scorer(s)	Attendance
R1	20 October	Stirling Albion	A	1–2		

=== Scottish Cup ===
Round	Date	Opponent	H/A	Score	Clydebank Scorer(s)	Attendance
R3	9 January	Airdrieonians	A	0–0		
R3 R	19 January	Airdrieonians	H	2–0		
R4	7 February	East Stirlingshire	A	2–1		
R5	6 March	Aberdeen	A	1–1		
R5 R	16 March	Aberdeen	H	3–4		
