= 1978–79 Clydebank F.C. season =

Clydebank F.C.
1978–79 season
- Manager: Bill Munro
- Scottish League Division One: 4th
- Scottish Cup: 4th Round
- Scottish League Cup: 3rd Round

The 1978–79 season was Clydebank's thirteenth season after being elected to the Scottish Football League. They competed in Scottish League Division One where they finished 4th. They also competed in the Scottish League Cup and Scottish Cup.

== Results ==
=== Division 1 ===
Match Day	Date	Opponent	H/A	Score	Clydebank Scorer(s)	Attendance
1	12 August	Kilmarnock	H	2–1		
2	19 August	Raith Rovers	A	2–4		
3	26 August	Dumbarton	H	1–1		
4	6 September	Arbroath	H	5–2		
5	9 September	Montrose	A	3–1		
6	13 September	Stirling Albion	H	5–2		
7	16 September	Hamilton Academical	H	4–1		
8	23 September	Dundee	A	0–2		
9	27 September	Airdrieonians	A	1–1		
10	30 September	Clyde	H	1–4		
11	7 October	St Johnstone	A	3–2		
12	14 October	Queen of the South	H	2–0		
13	21 October	Ayr United	A	3–4		
14	28 October	Raith Rovers	H	2–1		
15	4 November	Dumbarton	A	2–1		
16	11 November	Montrose	H	1–0		
17	18 November	Hamilton Academical	A	0–1		
18	25 November	Dundee	H	2–1		
19	2 December	Clyde	A	2–1		
20	16 December	Queen of the South	A	1–2		
21	23 December	Ayr United	H	3–1		
22	17 February	Hamilton Academical	H	3–1		
23	21 February	Dundee	A	1–2		
24	28 February	Queen of the South	H	3–1		
25	3 March	Kilmarnock	A	0–0		
26	7 March	St Johnstone	H	3–0		
27	10 March	Arbroath	H	2–2		
28	13 March	Stirling Albion	A	3–2		
29	17 March	Stirling Albion	H	0–0		
30	24 March	Airdrieonians	H	4–1		
31	28 March	Montrose	A	2–1		
32	31 March	Kilmarnock	H	1–2		
33	7 April	Airdrieonians	A	3–1		
34	14 April	Clyde	A	1–0		
35	18 April	St Johnstone	H	1–0		
36	21 April	Ayr United	H	0–1		
37	25 April	Dumbarton	H	3–1		
38	28 April	Arbroath	A	1–1		
39	2 May	Raith Rovers	A	2–1		

==== Final League table ====
Pos	Team	Pld	W	D	L	GF	GA	GD	Pts	Promotion or relegation
1	Dundee (C, P)	39	24	7	8	69	36	+33	55	Promotion to the Premier Division
2	Kilmarnock (P)	39	22	10	7	72	36	+36	54	Promotion to the Premier Division
3	Clydebank	39	24	6	9	78	50	+28	54	
4	Ayr United	39	21	5	13	73	54	+19	47	
5	Hamilton Academical	39	17	9	13	63	61	+2	43	

Source: RSSSF and statto
Rules for classification: 1) points; 2) goal difference; 3) number of goals scored.
(C) Champions; (P) Promoted

=== Scottish League Cup ===
Round	Date	Opponent	H/A	Score	Clydebank Scorer(s)	Attendance
R2 L1	30 August	Stenhousemuir	A	0–1		
R2 L2	2 September	Stenhousemuir	H	4–1		
R3 L1	4 October	Hibernian	A	0–1		
R3 L2	3 September	Hibernian	H	1–1		

=== Scottish Cup ===
Round	Date	Opponent	H/A	Score	Clydebank Scorer(s)	Attendance
R3	31 January	Queen's Park	H	3–3		
R3 R	12 February	Queen's Park	A	1–0		
R4	24 February	Dumbarton	A	1–3		
