= 1982–83 Clydebank F.C. season =

Clydebank F.C.
1982–83 season
- Manager: Sammy Henderson
- Scottish League Division One: 3rd
- Scottish Cup: 3rd Round
- Scottish League Cup: Group stage

The 1982–83 season was Clydebank's seventeenth season after being elected to the Scottish Football League. They competed in Scottish League Division One where they finished 3rd. They also competed in the Scottish League Cup and Scottish Cup.

== Results ==
=== Division 1 ===
Match Day	Date	Opponent	H/A	Score	Clydebank Scorer(s)	Attendance
1	4 September	Raith Rovers	H	1–1		
2	11 September	Alloa Athletic	A	0–2		
3	15 September	Dumbarton	H	5–1		
4	18 September	Clyde	A	5–3		
5	22 September	Airdrieonians	H	0–4		
6	25 September	Queen's Park	H	2–0		
7	29 September	Heart of Midlothian	A	1–4		
8	2 October	Ayr United	A	3–1		
9	9 October	Partick Thistle	A	1–0		
10	16 October	Dunfermline Athletic	H	1–1		
11	23 October	Falkirk	A	2–0		
12	30 October	St Johnstone	H	1–0		
13	6 November	Hamilton Academical	A	2–0		
14	13 November	Heart of Midlothian	H	0–3		
15	20 November	Clyde	H	2–2		
16	27 November	Airdrieonians	A	2–2		
17	4 December	Ayr United	H	0–1		
18	11 December	Queen's Park	A	2–2		
19	18 December	Raith Rovers	A	3–0		
20	27 December	Alloa Athletic	H	2–2		
21	1 January	Dumbarton	A	4–0		
22	3 January	Hamilton Academical	H	2–1		
23	15 January	Partick Thistle	H	1–3		
24	22 January	St Johnstone	A	1–0		
25	5 February	Falkirk	H	0–2		
26	12 February	Alloa Athletic	A	2–1		
27	23 February	Dunfermline Athletic	A	1–1		
28	26 February	Dumbarton	H	3–1		
29	5 March	Ayr United	A	0–1		
30	12 March	St Johnstone	H	6–1		
31	19 March	Dunfermline Athletic	A	1–1		
32	26 March	Raith Rovers	A	3–1		
33	2 April	Clyde	H	2–1		
34	9 April	Falkirk	A	2–0		
35	16 April	Heart of Midlothian	A	2–2		
36	23 April	Airdrieonians	H	2–0		
37	30 April	Hamilton Academical	H	1–1		
38	7 May	Queen's Park	A	3–1		
39	14 May	Partick Thistle	H	1–2		

==== Final League table ====
Pos	Team	Pld	W	D	L	GF	GA	GD	Pts	Promotion or relegation
1	St Johnstone (C, P)	39	25	5	9	59	37	+22	55	Promotion to the Premier Division
2	Heart of Midlothian (P)	39	22	10	7	79	38	+41	54	Promotion to the Premier Division
3	Clydebank	39	20	10	9	72	49	+23	50	
4	Partick Thistle	39	20	9	10	66	45	+21	49	
5	Airdrieonians	39	16	7	16	62	46	+16	39	

Source: RSSSF
Rules for classification: 1) points; 2) goal difference; 3) number of goals scored.
(C) Champions; (P) Promoted

=== Scottish League Cup ===
==== Group stage ====
Round	Date	Opponent	H/A	Score	Clydebank Scorer(s)	Attendance
G3	14 August	Airdrieonians	A	3–1		
G3	18 August	Hibernian	H	0–2		
G3	21 August	Rangers	H	1–4		
G3	25 August	Hibernian	A	1–1		
G3	28 August	Airdireonians	H	2–1		
G3	1 September	Rangers	A	2–3		

==== Group 3 final table ====
P	Team	Pld	W	D	L	GF	GA	GD	Pts
1	Rangers	6	4	2	0	13	6	7	10
2	Hibernian	6	1	4	1	6	6	0	6
3	Airdireonians	6	2	1	3	9	11	–2	5
4	Clydebank	6	1	1	4	8	13	–5	3

=== Scottish Cup ===
Round	Date	Opponent	H/A	Score	Clydebank Scorer(s)	Attendance
R3	29 January	Celtic	H	0–3		
