= 1979–80 Clydebank F.C. season =

Clydebank F.C.
1979–80 season
- Manager: Bill Munro
- Scottish League Division One: 9th
- Scottish Cup: 3rd Round
- Scottish League Cup: 2nd Round

The 1979–80 season was Clydebank's fourteenth season after being elected to the Scottish Football League. They competed in Scottish League Division One where they finished 9th. They also competed in the Scottish League Cup and Scottish Cup.

== Results ==
=== Division 1 ===
Match Day	Date	Opponent	H/A	Score	Clydebank Scorer(s)	Attendance
1	11 August	Motherwell	H	1–1		
2	18 August	Clyde	A	0–1		
3	25 August	Dumbarton	H	2–1		
4	5 September	Stirling Albion	A	0–2		
5	8 September	Heart of Midltohian	A	1–2		
6	11 September	Airdrieonians	H	2–2		
7	15 September	Ayr United	H	1–0		
8	19 September	Arbroath	A	2–3		
9	22 September	Raith Rovers	A	4–2		
10	29 September	St Johnstone	H	1–2		
11	6 October	Dunfermline Athletic	A	3–1		
12	13 October	Berwick Rangers	A	3–2		
13	20 October	Hamilton Academical	H	4–0		
14	27 October	Clyde	H	2–2		
15	3 November	Dumbarton	A	0–1		
16	10 November	Heart of Midlothian	H	1–1		
17	17 November	Ayr United	A	2–2		
18	1 December	St Johnstone	A	1–0		
19	15 December	Berwick Rangers	H	0–0		
20	22 December	Hamilton Academical	A	0–3		
21	29 December	Clyde	A	2–0		
22	5 January	Heart of Midlothian	A	3–3		
23	12 January	Ayr United	H	1–0		
24	19 January	Arbroath	H	5–1		
25	16 February	Arbroath	H	3–1		
26	20 February	Airdrieonians	H	0–1		
27	23 February	Berwick Rangers	A	1–2		
28	1 March	Motherwell	H	1–2		
29	8 March	Stirling Albion	A	0–2		
30	15 March	Airdrieonians	A	1–3		
31	19 March	Dunfermline Athletic	H	3–1		
32	25 March	Raith Rovers	H	1–0		
33	29 March	Motherwell	A	2–3		
34	2 April	Dumbarton	H	2–2		
35	5 April	Raith Rovers	H	0–3		
36	9 April	Dunfermline Athletic	H	0–1		
37	12 April	St Johnstone	A	1–3		
38	19 April	Hamilton Academical	H	2–0		
39	26 April	Stirling Albion	H	0–1		

==== Final League table ====
Pos	Team	Pld	W	D	L	GF	GA	GD	Pts
7	Hamilton Academical	39	15	10	14	60	59	+1	40
8	Stirling Albion	39	13	13	13	40	40	0	39
9	Clydebank	39	14	8	17	58	57	+1	36
10	Dunfermline Athletic	39	11	13	15	39	57	−18	35
11	St Johnstone	39	12	10	17	57	74	−17	34

Source: RSSSF and statto
Rules for classification: 1) points; 2) goal difference; 3) number of goals scored.

=== Scottish League Cup ===
Round	Date	Opponent	H/A	Score	Clydebank Scorer(s)	Attendance
R2 L1	29 August	Hamilton Academical	H	0–0		
R2 L2	2 September	Hamilton Academical	A	0–1		

=== Scottish Cup ===
Round	Date	Opponent	H/A	Score	Clydebank Scorer(s)	Attendance
R3	26 January	Stirling Albion	H	1–1		
R3 R	30 January	Stirling Albion	A	1–1		
R3 2R	11 February	Stirling Albion	H	0–1		
