= 1988–89 Clydebank F.C. season =

Clydebank F.C.
1988–89 season
- Manager: Jim Fallon
- Scottish League First Division: 3rd
- Scottish Cup: 4th Round
- Scottish League Cup: 3rd Round

The 1988–89 season was Clydebank's twenty-third season in the Scottish Football League. They competed in the Scottish First Division and finished 3rd. They also competed in the Scottish League Cup and Scottish Cup.

== Results ==
=== Division 1 ===
Match Day	Date	Opponent	H/A	Score	Clydebank Scorer(s)	Attendance
1	13 August	Ayr United	A	2–3		
2	20 August	Falkirk	H	2–2		
3	27 August	Morton	A	0–1		
4	3 September	Kilmarnock	H	2–2		
5	10 September	Clyde	A	5–0		
6	17 September	Dunfermline Athletic	H	2–1		
7	24 September	Meadowbank Thistle	A	0–0		
8	1 October	Forfar Athletic	H	2–2		
9	8 October	Partick Thistle	A	1–1		
10	15 October	Raith Rovers	A	3–1		
11	22 October	Airdireonians	H	3–3		
12	29 October	Queen of the South	A	3–0		
13	5 November	St Johnstone	H	2–0		
14	12 November	Clyde	H	3–2		
15	19 November	Dunfermline Athletic	A	2–2		
16	26 November	Meadowbank Thistle	H	2–1		
17	3 December	Falkirk	A	1–3		
18	10 December	Queen of the South	H	4–2		
19	17 December	Airdrieonians	A	1–1		
20	24 December	Raith Rovers	H	3–1		
21	31 December	Kilmarnock	A	0–1		
22	3 January	Morton	H	1–1		
23	7 January	St Johnstone	A	0–2		
24	18 January	Ayr United	H	5–1		
25	21 January	Partick Thistle	H	3–2		
26	4 February	Forfar Athletic	A	4–2		
27	14 February	Queen of the South	H	3–0		
28	28 February	Clyde	A	1–1		
29	4 March	Dunfermline Athletic	H	0–1		
30	11 March	Meadowbank Thistle	A	1–1		
31	25 March	Falkirk	H	0–1		
32	1 April	St Johnstone	H	2–2		
33	4 April	Morton	A	0–1		
34	8 April	Ayr United	A	4–2		
35	15 April	Forfar Athletic	A	2–1		
36	22 April	Partick Thistle	H	4–2		
37	29 April	Raith Rovers	A	0–3		
38	6 May	Kilmarnock	H	3–2		
39	13 May	Airdrieonains	H	4–1		

==== Final League table ====
Pos	Team	Pld	W	D	L	GF	GA	GD	Pts	Promotion or relegation
1	Dunfermline Athletic (C, P)	39	22	10	7	60	36	+24	54	Promotion to the Premier Division
2	Falkirk	39	22	8	9	71	37	+34	52	
3	Clydebank	39	18	12	9	80	55	+25	48	
4	Airdrieonians	39	17	13	9	66	44	+22	47	
5	Morton	39	16	9	14	46	46	0	41	

Source: RSSSF and statto
Rules for classification: 1) points; 2) goal difference; 3) number of goals scored.
(C) Champions; (P) Promoted

=== Scottish League Cup ===
Round	Date	Opponent	H/A	Score	Clydebank Scorer(s)	Attendance
R2	17 August	Stenhousemuir	H	2–0		
R3	24 August	Rangers	A	0–6		

=== Scottish Cup ===
Round	Date	Opponent	H/A	Score	Clydebank Scorer(s)	Attendance
R3	25 January	Montrose	H	2–1		
R4	18 February	Celtic	A	1–4		
