= 1997–98 Clydebank F.C. season =

Clydebank F.C.
1997–98 season
- Manager: Ian McCall
- Scottish League Second Division: 2nd
- Scottish Cup: 3rd Round
- Scottish League Cup: 2nd Round
- Scottish Challenge Cup: Quarter-final
Home colours

The 1997–98 season was Clydebank's thirty-second season in the Scottish Football League. They competed in the Scottish Second Division where they finished 2nd and promoted back to the Scottish First Division. They also competed in the Scottish League Cup, Scottish Challenge Cup and Scottish Cup.

== Results ==
=== Division 2 ===
Round	Date	Opponent	H/A	Score	Clydebank Scorer(s)	Attendance
1	5 August	Brechin City	H	3–0		
2	16 August	Queen of the South	A	2–2		
3	23 August	Clyde	H	2–2		
4	30 August	Forfar Athletic	A	2–0		
5	13 September	East Fife	H	1–2		
6	20 September	Stenhousemuir	H	1–0		
7	27 September	Livingston	A	0–0		
8	4 October	Stranraer	H	0–0		
9	18 October	Inverness Caledonian Thistle	A	0–0		
10	25 October	Clyde	A	1–0		
11	5 November	Queen of the South	H	4–0		
12	8 November	Forfar Athletic	H	1–1		
13	15 November	East Fife	A	3–2		
14	22 November	Livingston	H	1–1		
15	29 November	Stenhousemuir	A	3–2		
16	13 December	Inverness Caledonian Thistle	H	1–1		
17	20 December	Stranraer	A	1–0		
18	27 December	Clyde	H	2–1		
19	10 January	Brechin City	A	1–0		
20	31 January	Stenhousemuir	H	1–0		
21	7 February	Inverness Caledonian Thistle	A	2–3		
22	10 February	Livingston	A	3–0		
23	14 February	Stranraer	H	0–1		
24	21 February	Brechin City	H	2–1		
25	24 February	Queen of the South	A	0–0		
26	28 February	Forfar Athletic	A	0–0		
27	14 March	Livingston	H	0–2		
28	17 March	East Fife	H	0–3		
29	21 March	Stenhousemuir	A	0–0		
30	28 March	Inverness Caledonian Thistle	H	1–0		
31	4 April	Stranraer	A	1–2		
32	11 April	Forfar Athletic	H	0–1		
33	18 April	East Fife	A	2–0		
34	25 April	Clyde	A	0–2		
35	2 May	Queen of the South	H	1–1		
36	9 May	Brechin City	A	6–1		

==== Final League table ====
Pos	Team	Pld	W	D	L	GF	GA	GD	Pts	Promotion or relegation
1	Stranraer (C, P)	36	18	7	11	62	44	+18	61	Promotion to the First Division
2	Clydebank (P)	36	16	12	8	48	31	+17	60	Promotion to the First Division
3	Livingston	36	16	11	9	56	40	+16	59	
4	Queen of the South	36	15	9	12	57	51	+6	54	
5	Inverness CT	36	13	10	13	65	51	+14	49	

Source: "1997-1998 Second Division - SPFL Archive". SPFL (in Malay).
Rules for classification: 1) points; 2) goal difference; 3) number of goals scored.
(C) Champions; (P) Promoted

=== Scottish League Cup ===
Round	Date	Opponent	H/A	Score	Clydebank Scorer(s)	Attendance
R2	9 August	St Mirren	A	0–2		

=== Scottish Challenge Cup ===
Round	Date	Opponent	H/A	Score	Clydebank Scorer(s)	Attendance
R1	12 August	Cowdenbeath	A	1–0		
R2	26 August	Ayr United	A	1–0		
QF	3 September	Morton	A	0–1		

=== Scottish Cup ===
Round	Date	Opponent	H/A	Score	Clydebank Scorer(s)	Attendance
R2	12 January	Montrose	H	6–0		
R3	24 January	Heart of Midlothian	A	0–2		
