= 1983–84 Clydebank F.C. season =

Clydebank F.C.
1983–84 season
- Manager: Sammy Henderson
- Scottish League Division One: 4th
- Scottish Cup: 4th Round
- Scottish League Cup: Group stage

The 1983–84 season was Clydebank's eighteenth season after being elected to the Scottish Football League. They competed in Scottish League Division One where they finished 4th. They also competed in the Scottish League Cup and Scottish Cup.

== Results ==
=== Division 1 ===
Match Day	Date	Opponent	H/A	Score	Clydebank Scorer(s)	Attendance
1	20 August	Dumbarton	A	0–2		
2	3 September	Clyde	H	1–0		
3	10 September	Raith Rovers	A	0–0		
4	14 September	Airdrieonians	A	0–1		
5	17 September	Alloa Athletic	H	2–7		
6	24 September	Partick Thistle	A	0–1		
7	28 September	Kilmarnock	H	4–0		
8	1 October	Meadowbank Thistle	A	3–1		
9	8 October	Ayr United	H	4–1		
10	15 October	Morton	H	3–3		
11	22 October	Falkirk	A	1–1		
12	29 October	Hamilton Academical	H	0–1		
13	5 November	Brechin City	H	1–0		
14	12 November	Airdrieonians	H	2–4		
15	19 November	Alloa Athletic	A	2–0		
16	26 November	Ayr United	A	2–2		
17	3 December	Meadowbank Thistle	H	3–0		
18	10 December	Partick Thistle	H	1–0		
19	17 December	Kilmarnock	A	1–0		
20	26 December	Raith Rovers	H	1–1		
21	31 December	Clyde	A	2–2		
22	2 January	Dumbarton	H	0–2		
23	7 January	Falkirk	H	3–1		
24	11 February	Ayr United	H	1–2		
25	21 February	Hamilton Academical	H	1–1		
26	25 February	Kilmarnock	H	3–0		
27	29 February	Morton	A	2–1		
28	3 March	Clyde	A	1–1		
29	10 March	Raith Rovers	H	4–3		
30	13 March	Brechin City	A	2–0		
31	17 March	Hamilton Academical	A	1–0		
32	24 March	Falkirk	H	1–2		
33	31 March	Airdrieonians	A	3–3		
34	7 April	Dumbarton	A	1–2		
35	14 April	Alloa Athletic	H	1–0		
36	21 April	Meadowbank Thistle	H	1–1		
37	28 April	Morton	H	1–1		
38	5 May	Partick Thistle	A	1–1		
39	12 May	Brechin City	A	2–2		

==== Final League table ====
Pos	Team	Pld	W	D	L	GF	GA	GD	Pts	Promotion or relegation
2	Dumbarton (P)	39	20	11	8	66	44	+22	51	Promotion to the Premier Division
3	Partick Thistle	39	19	8	12	67	50	+17	46	
4	Clydebank	39	16	13	10	62	50	+12	45	
5	Brechin City	39	14	14	11	56	58	−2	42	
6	Kilmarnock	39	16	6	17	57	53	+4	38	

Source: RSSSF and statto
Rules for classification: 1) points; 2) goal difference; 3) number of goals scored.
(P) Promoted

=== Scottish League Cup ===
Round	Date	Opponent	H/A	Score	Clydebank Scorer(s)	Attendance
R2	23 August	Ayr United	A	2–1		
R2	27 August	Ayr United	H	1–0		

==== Group stage ====
Round	Date	Opponent	H/A	Score	Clydebank Scorer(s)	Attendance
G2	31 August	Rangers	A	0–4		
G2	7 September	St Mirren	H	2–0		
G2	5 October	Heart of Midlothian	A	1–1		
G2	26 October	St Mirren	A	3–3		
G2	9 November	Rangers	H	0–3		
G2	30 November	Rangers	H	0–3		

==== Group 2 final table ====
P	Team	Pld	W	D	L	GF	GA	GD	Pts
1	Rangers	6	6	0	0	18	0	18	12
2	Heart of Midlothian	6	2	2	2	9	9	0	6
3	Clydebank	6	1	2	3	6	14	–8	4
4	St Mirren	6	0	2	4	6	16	–10	2

=== Scottish Cup ===
Round	Date	Opponent	H/A	Score	Clydebank Scorer(s)	Attendance
R3	8 February	Brechin City	H	0–0		
R3 R	13 February	Brechin City	A	3–0		
R4	18 February	Motherwell	A	1–3		
