= 1981–82 Clydebank F.C. season =

Clydebank F.C.
1981–82 season
- Manager: Sammy Henderson
- Scottish League Division One: 4th
- Scottish Cup: 4th Round
- Scottish League Cup: Group stage

The 1981–82 season was Clydebank's sixteenth season after being elected to the Scottish Football League. They competed in Scottish League Division One where they finished 4th. They also competed in the Scottish League Cup and Scottish Cup.

== Results ==
=== Division 1 ===
Match Day	Date	Opponent	H/A	Score	Clydebank Scorer(s)	Attendance
1	29 August	Queen's Park	A	2–2		
2	5 September	St Johnstone	H	2–3		
3	8 September	Kilmarnock	H	0–0		
4	12 September	Dumbarton	A	3–1		
5	16 September	Dunfermline Athletic	H	4–1		
6	19 September	Heart of Midlothian	A	0–1		
7	26 September	Falkirk	H	1–1		
8	3 October	Queen of the South	A	1–2		
9	10 October	Raith Rovers	A	2–0		
10	17 October	Motherwell	H	1–7		
11	20 October	Hamilton Academical	H	2–1		
12	24 October	East Stirlingshire	A	0–0		
13	31 October	Ayr United	H	2–1		
14	7 November	St Johnstone	A	3–1		
15	14 November	Queen's Park	H	2–1		
16	21 November	Dunfermline Athletic	A	6–3		
17	28 November	Falkirk	A	0–3		
18	5 December	Queen of the South	H	2–1		
19	12 December	Hamilton Academical	A	2–0		
20	19 January	Motherwell	A	1–3		
21	30 January	East Stirlingshire	H	2–1		
22	3 February	Raith Rovers	H	0–1		
23	6 February	Ayr United	A	1–2		
24	17 February	Dumbarton	H	3–0		
25	20 February	Hamilton Academical	A	1–3		
26	27 February	Falkirk	H	0–2		
27	10 March	Queen's Park	H	1–0		
28	13 March	Dumbarton	A	2–0		
29	20 March	Queen of the South	H	5–1		
30	27 March	Heart of Midlothian	H	2–1		
31	3 April	Kilmarnock	A	0–0		
32	10 April	East Stirlingshire	A	1–0		
33	14 April	Heart of Midlothian	H	1–5		
34	17 April	Raith Rovers	H	0–0		
35	21 April	Kilmarnock	A	0–2		
36	24 April	Motherwell	A	0–0		
37	1 May	Dunfermline Athletic	H	1–0		
38	8 May	St Johnstone	A	3–3		
39	15 May	Ayr United	H	2–0		

==== Final League table ====
Pos	Team	Pld	W	D	L	GF	GA	GD	Pts	Promotion or relegation
2	Kilmarnock (P)	39	17	17	5	60	29	+31	51	Promotion to the Premier Division
3	Heart of Midlothian	39	21	8	10	65	37	+28	50	
4	Clydebank	39	19	8	12	61	53	+8	46	
5	St Johnstone	39	17	8	14	69	60	+9	42	
6	Ayr United	39	15	12	12	56	50	+6	42	

Source: RSSSF
Rules for classification: 1) points; 2) goal difference; 3) number of goals scored.
(P) Promoted

=== Scottish League Cup ===
==== Group stage ====
Round	Date	Opponent	H/A	Score	Clydebank Scorer(s)	Attendance
G7	8 August	Queen's Park	A	1–0		
G7	12 August	Berwick Rangers	H	2–2		
G7	15 August	Clyde	A	0–3		
G7	19 August	Berwick Rangers	A	1–3		
G7	22 August	Queen's Park	H	4–1		
G7	26 August	Clyde	H	1–0		

==== Group 7 final table ====
P	Team	Pld	W	D	L	GF	GA	GD	Pts
1	Berwick Rangers	6	3	2	1	12	8	4	8
2	Queen's Park	6	4	0	2	8	7	1	8
3	Clydebank	6	2	1	3	8	10	–2	5
4	Clyde	6	1	1	4	6	9	–3	3

=== Scottish Cup ===
Round	Date	Opponent	H/A	Score	Clydebank Scorer(s)	Attendance
R3	23 January	Dunfermline Athletic	H	2–1		
R4	13 February	St Mirren	H	0–2		
