= 1996–97 Clydebank F.C. season =

Clydebank F.C.
1996-97 season
- Manager: Brian Wright
- Scottish League First Division: 9th
- Scottish Cup: 3rd Round
- Scottish League Cup: 2nd Round
- Scottish Challenge Cup: 1st Round
Home colours

The 1996–97 season was Clydebank's thirty-first season in the Scottish Football League. They competed in the Scottish First Division where they finished 9th and relegated to the Scottish Second Division. They also competed in the Scottish League Cup, Scottish Challenge Cup and Scottish Cup.

== Results ==
=== Division 1 ===
Round	Date	Opponent	H/A	Score	Clydebank Scorer(s)	Attendance
1	17 August	Morton	A	0–3		
2	24 August	Stirling Albion	H	1–0		
3	3 September	East Fife	A	1–1		
4	7 September	St Mirren	H	2–1		
5	14 September	Falkirk	A	0–2		
6	21 September	St Johnstone	H	2–1		
7	28 September	Partick Thistle	A	0–1		
8	5 October	Dundee	A	1–2		
9	12 October	Airdireonians	H	1–4		
10	19 October	Morton	H	2–1		
11	26 October	Stirling Albion	A	0–2		
12	2 November	Falirk	H	0–1		
13	9 November	St Mireen	A	0–1		
14	16 November	Partick Thistle	H	1–3		
15	23 November	St Johnstone	A	0–2		
16	30 November	Dundee	H	0–0		
17	11 December	Airdrieonians	A	1–3		
18	21 December	East Fife	H	2–0		
19	26 December	Morton	A	2–2		
20	1 January	Partick Thistle	A	1–3		
21	4 January	Falkirk	H	1–1		
22	18 January	Dundee	A	0–1		
23	1 February	Airdrieonians	H	1–1		
24	4 February	St Johnstone	H	1–1		
25	8 February	East Fife	A	2–1		
26	15 February	St Mirren	H	0–1		
27	22 February	Stirling Albion	H	1–2		
28	1 March	St Johnstone	A	0–1		
29	15 March	Partick Thistle	H	4–1		
30	22 March	Dundee	H	0–0		
31	5 April	Airdrieonians	A	1–4		
32	12 April	St Mirren	A	0–1		
33	19 April	Falkirk	H	1–2		
34	26 April	Morton	H	0–1		
35	3 May	Stirling Albion	A	2–4		
36	10 May	East Fife	H	0–4		

==== Final League table ====
Pos	Team	Pld	W	D	L	GF	GA	GD	Pts	Promotion or relegation
6	Partick Thistle	36	12	12	12	49	48	+1	48	
7	Stirling Albion	36	12	10	14	54	61	−7	46	
8	Morton	36	12	9	15	42	41	+1	45	
9	Clydebank (R)	36	7	7	22	31	59	−28	28	Relegation to the Second Division
10	East Fife (R)	36	2	8	26	28	92	−64	14	Relegation to the Second Division

Source: RSSSF
Rules for classification: 1) points; 2) goal difference; 3) number of goals scored.
(R) Relegated

=== Scottish League Cup ===
Round	Date	Opponent	H/A	Score	Clydebank Scorer(s)	Attendance
R2	14 August	Rangers	H	0–3		6,376

=== Scottish Challenge Cup ===
Round	Date	Opponent	H/A	Score	Clydebank Scorer(s)	Attendance
R1	10 August	East Stirlingshire	H	0–0 (ES won 3–2 on penalties)		263

=== Scottish Cup ===
Round	Date	Opponent	H/A	Score	Clydebank Scorer(s)	Attendance
R3	26 January	Celtic	H	0–5		16,285
