= 1990–91 Clydebank F.C. season =

Clydebank F.C.
1990–91 season
- Manager: Jim Fallon
- Scottish League First Division: 8th
- Scottish Cup: 3rd Round
- Scottish League Cup: 2nd Round
- Scottish Challenge Cup: 1st Round
Home colours

The 1990–91 season was Clydebank's twenty-fifth season in the Scottish Football League. They competed in the Scottish First Division and finished 8th. They also competed in the Scottish League Cup, Scottish Challenge Cup and Scottish Cup.

== Results ==
=== Division 1 ===
Match Day	Date	Opponent	H/A	Score	Clydebank Scorer(s)	Attendance
1	25 August	Clyde	A	0–1		
2	1 September	Falkirk	H	3–1		
3	8 September	Dundee	H	1–3		
4	15 September	Partick Thistle	A	1–0		
5	18 September	Kilmarnock	H	1–3		
6	22 September	Raith Rovers	A	0–2		
7	29 September	Meadowbank Thistle	H	2–2		
8	6 October	Airdrieonians	A	2–2		
9	10 October	Forfar Athletic	H	2–2		
10	13 October	Morton	A	0–2		
11	20 October	Hamilton Academical	H	3–1		
12	27 October	Ayr United	A	1–1		
13	3 November	Brechin City	H	3–4		
14	10 November	Falkirk	A	1–5		
15	17 November	Clyde	H	2–1		
16	24 November	Forfar Athletic	A	3–0		
17	1 December	Airdrieonians	H	5–1		
18	8 December	Meadowbank Thistle	A	3–0		
19	15 December	Raith Rovers	H	1–1		
20	22 December	Ayr United	H	0–2		
21	2 January	Morton	H	4–2		
22	5 January	Hamilton Academical	A	0–2		
23	19 January	Partick Thistle	H	2–3		
24	29 January	Brechin City	A	2–3		
25	2 February	Kilmarnock	A	0–3		
26	5 February	Dundee	A	0–1		
27	27 February	Falkirk	H	2–2		
28	9 March	Airdrieonians	H	1–3		
29	12 March	Clyde	A	1–3		
30	16 March	Brechin City	H	1–0		
31	23 March	Forfar Athletic	A	2–2		
32	30 March	Dundee	H	1–1		
33	2 April	Morton	A	2–2		
34	6 April	Ayr United	A	1–0		
35	13 April	Meadowbank Thistle	A	3–2		
36	20 April	Kilmarnock	H	0–0		
37	27 April	Hamilton Academical	H	1–3		
38	4 May	Raith Rovers	A	2–1		
27	11 May	Partick Thistle	H	7–1		

==== Final League table ====
Pos	Team	Pld	W	D	L	GF	GA	GD	Pts
6	Hamilton Academical	39	16	10	13	50	41	+9	42
7	Raith Rovers	39	14	9	16	54	64	−10	37
8	Clydebank	39	13	10	16	65	70	−5	36
9	Morton	39	11	13	15	48	55	−7	35
10	Forfar Athletic	39	9	15	15	50	57	−7	33

Source: RSSSF and statto
Rules for classification: 1) points; 2) goal difference; 3) number of goals scored.

=== Scottish League Cup ===
Round	Date	Opponent	H/A	Score	Clydebank Scorer(s)	Attendance
R2	21 August	Kilmarnock	A	2–3		

=== Scottish Challenge Cup ===
Round	Date	Opponent	H/A	Score	Clydebank Scorer(s)	Attendance
R1	2 October	East Fife	H	1–2		

=== Scottish Cup ===
Round	Date	Opponent	H/A	Score	Clydebank Scorer(s)	Attendance
R3	26 January	Ayr United	H	0–1		
