= 1989–90 Clydebank F.C. season =

Clydebank F.C.
1989-90 season
- Manager: Jim Fallon
- Scottish League First Division: 3rd
- Scottish Cup: Semi-final
- Scottish League Cup: 3rd Round
Home colours

The 1989–90 season was Clydebank's twenty-fourth season in the Scottish Football League. They competed in the Scottish First Division and finished 3rd. They also competed in the Scottish League Cup and Scottish Cup.

== Results ==
=== Division 1 ===
Match Day	Date	Opponent	H/A	Score	Clydebank Scorer(s)	Attendance
1	12 August	Partick Thistle	H	1–2		
2	19 August	St Johnstone	A	1–2		
3	26 August	Morton	H	3–1		
4	2 September	Albion Rovers	A	4–3		
5	5 September	Clyde	H	2–1		
6	9 September	Forfar Athletic	A	2–2		
7	16 September	Ayr United	A	2–3		
8	23 September	Meadowbank Thistle	H	1–1		
9	30 September	Raith Rovers	A	0–1		
10	7 October	Hamilton Academical	H	2–2		
11	14 October	Falkirk	A	1–2		
12	21 October	Airdrieonians	H	0–3		
13	28 October	Alloa Athletic	A	4–1		
14	4 November	Clyde	A	0–2		
15	11 November	Forfar Athletic	H	3–2		
16	18 November	Ayr United	H	4–1		
17	25 November	Meadowbank Thistle	A	1–1		
18	2 December	Raith Rovers	H	3–1		
19	9 December	Hamilton Academical	A	1–2		
20	23 December	Falkirk	H	3–3		
21	26 December	Partick Thistle	A	1–1		
22	30 December	St Johnstone	H	4–0		
23	3 January	Morton	A	0–2		
24	6 January	Albion Rovers	H	3–1		
25	13 January	Alloa Athletic	H	3–1		
26	30 January	Airdrieonians	A	2–2		
27	3 February	Hamilton Academical	A	3–1		
28	10 February	Forfar Athletic	H	3–2		
29	21 February	Falkirk	A	1–0		
30	3 March	Ayr United	H	0–1		
31	24 March	Raith Rovers	H	2–2		
32	27 March	Meadowbank Thistle	H	2–1		
33	31 March	Partick Thistle	A	0–4		
34	3 April	Airdrieonians	A	4–3		
35	7 April	Clyde	H	2–1		
36	17 April	St Johnstone	A	3–1		
37	21 April	Morton	H	0–1		
38	28 April	Alloa Athletic	A	1–1		
39	5 May	Albion Rovers	A	2–1		

==== Final League table ====
Pos	Team	Pld	W	D	L	GF	GA	GD	Pts	Promotion or relegation
1	St Johnstone (C, P)	39	25	8	6	81	39	+42	58	Promotion to the Premier Division
2	Airdrieonians	39	23	8	8	77	45	+32	54	
3	Clydebank	39	17	10	12	74	64	+10	44	
4	Falkirk	39	14	15	10	59	46	+13	43	
5	Raith Rovers	39	15	12	12	57	50	+7	42	

Source: RSSSF and statto
Rules for classification: 1) points; 2) goal difference; 3) number of goals scored.
(C) Champions; (P) Promoted

=== Scottish League Cup ===
Round	Date	Opponent	H/A	Score	Clydebank Scorer(s)	Attendance
R2	16 August	Meadowbank Thistle	H	3–1		
R3	22 August	Hibernian	A	0–0 (Hibs win 5–3 on penalties)		

=== Scottish Cup ===
Round	Date	Opponent	H/A	Score	Clydebank Scorer(s)	Attendance
R3	20 January	Albion Rovers	A	2–0		
R4	28 February	St Mirren	A	1–1		
R4 R	12 March	St Mirren	H	3–2		
R5	17 March	Stirling Albion	A	1–1		
R5 R	21 March	Stirling Albion	H	1–0		
SF	14 April	Celtic	N	0–2		
