= 1995–96 Clydebank F.C. season =

Clydebank F.C.
1995-96 season
- Manager: Brian Wright
- Scottish League First Division: 7th
- Scottish Cup: 3rd Round
- Scottish League Cup: 2nd Round
- Scottish Challenge Cup: Quarter-finalists
Home colours

The 1995–96 season was Clydebank's thirtieth season in the Scottish Football League. They competed in the Scottish First Division where they finished 7th. They also competed in the Scottish League Cup, Scottish Challenge Cup and Scottish Cup.

== Results ==
=== Division 1 ===
Round	Date	Opponent	H/A	Score	Clydebank Scorer(s)	Attendance
1	12 August	St Mirren	H	1–1		
2	27 August	Hamilton Academical	A	1–0		
3	2 September	Dundee	H	1–1		
4	9 September	Dunfermline Athletic	A	2–1		
5	16 September	Dundee United	H	1–2		
6	23 September	St Johnstone	A	2–2		
7	30 September	Dumbarton	H	2–1		
8	7 October	Morton	H	1–0		
9	14 October	Airdireonians	A	1–1		
10	21 October	Dundee	A	1–1		
11	28 October	Hamilton Academical	H	2–0		
12	31 October	Dundee United	A	0–3		
13	11 November	Dunfermline Athletic	H	0–4		
14	18 November	Dumbarton	A	2–1		
15	25 November	St Johnstone	H	2–0		
16	2 December	Morton	A	0–3		
17	16 December	St Mirren	A	1–2		
18	6 January	Dundee United	H	1–1		
19	9 January	Airdrieonians	H	1–1		
20	13 January	Dunfermline Athletic	A	3–4		
21	16 January	Dundee	H	0–1		
22	20 January	Morton	H	0–1		
23	23 January	St Johnstone	A	1–3		
24	10 February	St Mirren	H	1–2		
25	13 February	Airdrieonians	A	1–1		
26	17 February	Dumbarton	H	1–0		
27	24 February	Hamilton Academical	A	1–1		
28	2 March	St Johnstone	H	1–2		
29	16 March	Dumbarton	A	1–0		
30	23 March	Dundee United	A	0–6		
31	30 March	Dunfermline Athletic	H	2–3		
32	6 April	Morton	A	0–0		
33	13 April	Airdrieonians	H	2–1		
34	20 April	Dundee	A	0–3		
35	27 April	Hamilton Academical	H	1–3		
36	4 May	St Mirren	A	1–2		

==== Final League table ====
Pos	Team	Pld	W	D	L	GF	GA	GD	Pts	Promotion or relegation
5	Dundee	36	15	12	9	53	40	+13	57	
6	St Mirren	36	13	8	15	46	51	−5	47	
7	Clydebank	36	10	10	16	39	58	−19	40	
8	Airdrieonians	36	9	11	16	43	54	−11	38	
9	Hamilton Academical (R)	36	10	6	20	40	57	−17	36	Relegation to the Second Division

Source: RSSSF
Rules for classification: 1) points; 2) goal difference; 3) number of goals scored.
(R) Relegated

=== Scottish League Cup ===
Round	Date	Opponent	H/A	Score	Clydebank Scorer(s)	Attendance
R2	19 August	Motherwell	H	1–1 (Motherwell won 4–1 on penalties)		

=== Scottish Challenge Cup ===
Round	Date	Opponent	H/A	Score	Clydebank Scorer(s)	Attendance
R1	22 August	Arbroath	H	2–0		
R2	12 September	St Johnstone	H	3–0		
QF	26 September	Dundee United	H	0–1		

=== Scottish Cup ===
Round	Date	Opponent	H/A	Score	Clydebank Scorer(s)	Attendance
R3	9 February	Stirling Albion	H	0–1		
