= 2001–02 Clydebank F.C. season =

Clydebank F.C.
2001–02 season
- Manager: Derek Ferguson
- Scottish League Second Division: 4th
- Scottish Cup: 2nd Round
- Scottish League Cup: 1st Round
- Scottish Challenge Cup: Quarter-final
Home colours

The 2001–02 season was Clydebank's thirty-sixth and final season in the Scottish Football League. They competed in the Scottish Second Division where they finished 4th. They also competed in the Scottish League Cup, Scottish Challenge Cup and Scottish Cup.

== Results ==
=== Division 2 ===
Round	Date	Opponent	H/A	Score	Clydebank Scorer(s)	Attendance
1	4 August	Forfar Athletic	A	2–1		
2	11 August	Hamilton Academical	H	3–2		
3	18 August	Berwick Rangers	A	2–0		
4	25 August	Queen of the South	A	0–1		
5	8 September	Morton	H	3–2		
6	15 September	Alloa Athletic	A	0–1		
7	19 September	Cowdenbeath	H	3–2		
8	22 September	Stenhousemuir	A	2–2		
9	29 September	Stranraer	H	1–3		
10	13 October	Forfar Athletic	H	1–1		
11	20 October	Hamilton Academical	A	0–3		
12	27 October	Morton	A	2–0		
13	3 November	Queen of the South	H	3–0		
14	10 November	Alloa Athletic	H	1–0		
15	24 November	Cowdenbeath	A	1–1		
16	1 December	Stenhousemuir	H	3–2		
17	15 December	Stranraer	A	1–0		
18	8 January	Morton	H	1–2		
19	12 January	Queen of the South	A	0–1		
20	19 January	Cowdenbeath	H	1–0		
21	2 February	Stranraer	H	1–2		
22	9 February	Stenhousemuir	A	0–0		
23	16 February	Hamilton Academical	H	1–1		
24	23 February	Berwick Rangers	A	1–0		
25	2 March	Queen of the South	H	0–1		
26	5 March	Forfar Athletic	A	2–1		
27	12 March	Alloa Athletic	A	2–2		
28	9 March	Morton	A	1–3		
29	16 March	Alloa Athletic	H	1–1		
30	23 March	Cowdenbeath	H	1–2		
31	30 March	Stenhousemuir	H	0–0		
32	3 April	Berwick Rangers	H	0–2		
33	6 April	Stranraer	A	1–1		
34	13 April	Forfar Athletic	H	1–0		
35	20 April	Hamilton Academical	A	0–2		
36	27 April	Berwick Rangers	H	0–2		

==== Final League table ====
Pos	Team	Pld	W	D	L	GF	GA	GD	Pts	Promotion or relegation
2	Alloa Athletic (P)	36	15	14	7	55	33	+22	59	Promotion to the First Division
3	Forfar Athletic	36	15	8	13	51	47	+4	53	
4	Clydebank (Note: Clydebank folded at the end of the season; their place in the Scottish Football League was subsequently purchased by Airdrie United for the following season.)	36	14	9	13	44	45	−1	51	Club folded after the season
5	Hamilton Academical	36	13	9	14	49	44	+5	48	
6	Berwick Rangers	36	12	11	13	44	52	−8	47	

Source: "2001-2002 Second Division - SPFL Archive". SPFL.
Rules for classification: 1) points; 2) goal difference; 3) number of goals scored.
(P) Promoted

=== Scottish League Cup ===
Round	Date	Opponent	H/A	Score	Clydebank Scorer(s)	Attendance
R1	11 September	Dumbarton	A	0–2		

=== Scottish Challenge Cup ===
Round	Date	Opponent	H/A	Score	Clydebank Scorer(s)	Attendance
R1	14 August	Falkirk	A	0–0 (Clydebank win on penalties)		
R2	21 August	Airdrieonians	H	1–2		

=== Scottish Cup ===
Round	Date	Opponent	H/A	Score	Clydebank Scorer(s)	Attendance
R1	18 November	Peterhead	A	1–0		
R2	8 December	Stranraer	H	0–1		
