= 2000–01 Clydebank F.C. season =

Clydebank F.C.
2000–01 season
- Manager: Steve Morrison Tommy Coyne
- Scottish League Second Division: 5th
- Scottish Cup: 1st Round
- Scottish League Cup: 1st Round
- Scottish Challenge Cup: Quarter-final
Home colours

The 2000–01 season was Clydebank's thirty-fifth season in the Scottish Football League. They competed in the Scottish Second Division where they finished 5th. They also competed in the Scottish League Cup, Scottish Challenge Cup and Scottish Cup.

== Results ==
=== Division 2 ===
Round	Date	Opponent	H/A	Score	Clydebank Scorer(s)	Attendance
1	5 August	Stirling Albion	A	2–2		
2	12 August	Stenhousemuir	H	1–0		
3	19 August	Arbroath	A	0–1		
4	26 August	Queen of the South	H	1–2		
5	9 September	Berwick Rangers	A	1–3		
6	16 September	Forfar Athletic	A	2–0		
7	23 September	Partick Thistle	H	2–1		
8	30 September	Stranraer	A	2–0		
9	7 October	Queen's Park	H	2–0		
10	14 October	Stirling Albion	H	3–0		
11	21 October	Stenhousemir	A	1–2		
12	28 October	Queen of the South	A	1–1		
13	4 November	Berwick Rangers	H	0–1		
14	11 November	Partick Thistle	A	0–2		
15	18 November	Forfar Athletic	H	1–1		
16	25 November	Queen's Park	A	1–1		
17	5 December	Stranraer	H	2–3		
18	16 December	Stirling Albion	A	0–0		
19	23 December	Arbroath	H	1–2		
20	2 January	Berwick Rangers	A	2–1		
21	27 January	Forfar Athletic	A	3–1		
22	13 February	Partick Thistle	H	0–4		
23	17 February	Arbroath	A	2–4		
24	6 March	Stranraer	A	0–0		
25	10 March	Queen of the South	A	0–1		
26	13 March	Queen of the South	H	1–2		
27	17 March	Partick Thistle	A	0–2		
28	20 March	Queen's Park	H	2–1		
29	27 March	Stenhousemuir	H	1–0		
30	31 March	Forfar Athletic	H	2–1		
31	7 April	Queen's Park	A	0–0		
32	10 April	Berwick Rangers	H	2–2		
33	14 April	Stranraer	H	0–0		
34	21 April	Stirling Albion	H	1–1		
35	28 April	Stenhousemuir	A	0–0		
36	5 May	Arbroath	H	3–1		

==== Final League table ====
Pos	Team	Pld	W	D	L	GF	GA	GD	Pts
3	Berwick Rangers	36	14	12	10	51	44	+7	54
4	Stranraer	36	15	9	12	51	50	+1	54
5	Clydebank	36	12	11	13	42	43	−1	47
6	Queen of the South	36	13	7	16	52	59	−7	46
7	Stenhousemuir	36	12	6	18	45	63	−18	42

Source: "2000-2001 Second Division - SPFL Archive". SPFL.
Rules for classification: 1) points; 2) goal difference; 3) number of goals scored.

=== Scottish League Cup ===
Round	Date	Opponent	H/A	Score	Clydebank Scorer(s)	Attendance
R1	8 August	Alloa Athletic	H	0–2		

=== Scottish Challenge Cup ===
Round	Date	Opponent	H/A	Score	Clydebank Scorer(s)	Attendance
R1	15 August	Albion Rovers	A	1–0		
R2	2 September	Peterhead	H	1–0		
QF	19 September	Airdrieonians	A	1–1 (Airdrie win on penalties)		

=== Scottish Cup ===
Round	Date	Opponent	H/A	Score	Clydebank Scorer(s)	Attendance
R1	18 December	Queen of the South	A	0–2		
