= 1998–99 Clydebank F.C. season =

Clydebank F.C.
1998–99 season
- Manager: Ian McCall
- Scottish League First Division: 7th
- Scottish Cup: 4th Round
- Scottish League Cup: 2nd Round
Home colours

The 1998–99 season was Clydebank's thirty-third season in the Scottish Football League. They competed in the Scottish First Division where they finished 7th. They also competed in the Scottish League Cup and Scottish Cup.

== Results ==
=== Division 1 ===
Round	Date	Opponent	H/A	Score	Clydebank Scorer(s)	Attendance
1	4 August	Airdrieonians	A	1–1		
2	15 August	Falkirk	H	0–1		
3	22 August	Stranraer	A	2–0		
4	29 August	Morton	A	2–2		
5	5 September	Hibernian	H	2–2		
6	12 September	Ayr United	H	0–1		
7	19 September	Hamilton Academical	A	2–1		
8	26 September	St Mirren	H	1–0		
9	3 October	Raith Rovers	A	1–0		
10	11 October	Falkirk	A	2–2		
11	17 October	Airdrieonians	H	0–1		
12	27 October	Morton	H	2–1		
13	31 October	Hibernian	A	1–2		
14	7 November	Hamilton Academical	H	0–0		
15	14 November	Ayr United	A	1–4		
16	21 November	St Mirren	A	0–0		
17	28 November	Raith Rovers	H	1–1		
18	5 December	Airdrieonians	A	0–2		
19	12 December	Stranraer	H	2–1		
20	19 December	Hibernian	A	0–3		
21	26 December	Morton	A	1–1		
22	12 January	Hamilton Academical	A	1–0		
23	16 January	St Mirren	H	2–2		
24	30 January	Raith Rovers	A	1–2		
25	20 February	Stranraer	A	2–0		
26	10 March	Falkirk	H	1–2		
27	13 March	Hibernian	H	2–0		
28	20 March	Raith Rovers	H	0–0		
29	3 April	St Mirren	A	1–1		
30	10 April	Hamilton Academical	H	0–0		
31	18 April	Ayr United	A	0–0		
32	21 April	Morton	H	1–2		
33	24 April	Airdrieonians	H	0–1		
34	27 April	Ayr United	H	2–1		
35	1 May	Falkirk	A	2–0		
36	8 May	Stranraer	H	1–2		

==== Final League table ====
Pos	Team	Pld	W	D	L	GF	GA	GD	Pts	Promotion or relegation
5	St Mirren	36	14	10	12	42	43	−1	52	
6	Morton	36	14	7	15	45	41	+4	49	
7	Clydebank	36	11	13	12	36	38	−2	46	
8	Raith Rovers	36	8	11	17	37	57	−20	35	
9	Hamilton Academical (R)	36	6	10	20	30	62	−32	28	Relegation to the Second Division

Source: "1998-1999 First Division - SPFL Archive". SPFL.
Rules for classification: 1) points; 2) goal difference; 3) number of goals scored.
(R) Relegated

=== Scottish League Cup ===
Round	Date	Opponent	H/A	Score	Clydebank Scorer(s)	Attendance
R2	1 August	Arbroath	A	1–0		
R2	8 August	Raith Rovers	A	0–2		

=== Scottish Cup ===
Round	Date	Opponent	H/A	Score	Clydebank Scorer(s)	Attendance
R3	3 February	Ross County	H	1–1		
R3 R	15 February	Ross County	A	3–2		
R4	3 March	Dundee United	H	2–2		
R4 R	6 March	Dundee United	A	0–3		
