= 1991–92 Scottish First Division =

Scottish First Division
- Season: 1991–92
- Champions: Dundee
- Promoted: Dundee; Partick Thistle
- Relegated: Montrose; Forfar Athletic
- Matches played: 264
- Goals scored: 688 (2.61 per match)
- Top goalscorer: Gordon Dalziel (26)
- Biggest home win: Ayr United 7–0 Meadowbank Thistle, 21.09.1991
- Biggest away win: Morton 1–7 Clydebank, 31.08.1991

The 1991–92 Scottish First Division season was won by Dundee, who were promoted along with Partick Thistle to the Premier Division. Montrose and Forfar Athletic were relegated.

== League table ==
Pos	Team	Pld	W	D	L	GF	GA	GD	Pts	Promotion or relegation
1	Dundee (C, P)	44	23	12	9	80	48	+32	58	Promotion to the Premier Division
2	Partick Thistle (P)	44	23	11	10	62	36	+26	57	Promotion to the Premier Division
3	Hamilton Academical	44	22	13	9	72	48	+24	57	
4	Kilmarnock	44	21	12	11	59	37	+22	54	
5	Raith Rovers	44	21	11	12	59	42	+17	53	
6	Ayr United	44	18	11	15	63	55	+8	47	
7	Morton	44	17	12	15	66	59	+7	46	
8	Stirling Albion	44	14	13	17	50	57	−7	41	
9	Clydebank	44	12	12	20	59	77	−18	36	
10	Meadowbank Thistle	44	7	16	21	37	59	−22	30	
11	Montrose (R)	44	5	17	22	45	85	−40	27	Relegation to the Second Division
12	Forfar Athletic (R)	44	5	12	27	36	85	−49	22	Relegation to the Second Division

Source: RSSSF and statto
Rules for classification: 1) points; 2) goal difference; 3) number of goals scored.
(C) Champions; (P) Promoted; (R) Relegated
