= 1999–2000 Clydebank F.C. season =

Clydebank F.C.
1999–2000 season
- Manager: Ian McCall Steve Morrison
- Scottish League First Division: 10th
- Scottish Cup: 4th round
- Scottish League Cup: 1st round
- Scottish Challenge Cup: Quarter-final
Home colours

The 1999–2000 season was Clydebank's thirty-fourth season in the Scottish Football League. They competed in the Scottish First Division where they finished 10th and relegated to the Scottish Second Division. They also competed in the Scottish League Cup, Scottish Challenge Cup and Scottish Cup.

== Results ==
=== Division 1 ===
Round	Date	Opponent	H/A	Score	Clydebank Scorer(s)	Attendance
1	7 August	Airdrieonians	H	0–2		
2	14 August	Morton	A	0–0		
3	21 August	Raith Rovers	H	1–1		
4	29 August	St Mirren	H	2–3		
5	4 September	Falkirk	A	2–3		
6	11 September	Inverness Caledonian Thistle	A	0–1		
7	18 September	Ayr United	H	0–2		
8	25 September	Livingston	A	1–2		
9	9 October	Dunfermline Athletic	H	1–4		
10	16 October	Falkirk	H	1–3		
11	23 October	Airdrieonians	A	0–1		
12	30 October	Inverness Caledonian Thistle	H	0–3		
13	6 November	Ayr United	A	0–0		
14	14 November	Falkirk	H	0–3		
15	20 November	St Mirren	A	1–2		
16	27 November	Dunfermline Athletic	A	1–2		
17	4 December	Livingston	H	1–5		
18	18 December	Airdrieonians	H	1–1		
19	27 December	Inverness Caledonian Thistle	A	1–4		
20	3 January	Ayr United	H	0–2		
21	8 January	Falkirk	A	0–4		
22	18 January	Raith Rovers	A	0–1		
23	22 January	Livingston	A	0–3		
24	5 February	Dunfermline Athletic	H	1–3		
25	26 February	Morton	A	0–1		
26	4 March	Inverness Caledonian Thistle	H	0–1		
27	7 March	Raith Rovers	H	2–1		
28	11 March	St Mirren	A	0–8		
29	18 March	Ayr United	A	0–4		
30	25 March	St Mirren	H	0–0		
31	2 April	Falkirk	H	0–1		
32	8 April	Livingston	H	1–2		
33	15 April	Dunfermline Athletic	A	0–6		
34	22 April	Airdrieonians	A	0–0		
35	29 April	Morton	H	0–3		
36	6 May	Raith Rovers	A	0–0		

==== Final League table ====
Pos	Team	Pld	W	D	L	GF	GA	GD	Pts	Promotion or relegation
6	Inverness CT	36	13	10	13	60	55	+5	49	
7	Ayr United	36	10	8	18	42	52	−10	38	
8	Morton	36	10	6	20	45	61	−16	36	
9	Airdrieonians	36	7	8	21	29	69	−40	29	
10	Clydebank (R)	36	1	7	28	17	82	−65	10	Relegation to the Second Division

Source: "1999-2000 First Division - SPFL Archive". SPFL.
Rules for classification: 1) points; 2) goal difference; 3) number of goals scored.
(R) Relegated

=== Scottish League Cup ===
Round	Date	Opponent	H/A	Score	Clydebank Scorer(s)	Attendance
R1	31 July	East Stirlingshire	H	1–2		

=== Scottish Challenge Cup ===
Round	Date	Opponent	H/A	Score	Clydebank Scorer(s)	Attendance
R1	10 August	East Stirlingshire	A	2–1		
R2	24 August	Forfar Athletic	H	4–3		
R3	14 September	Inverness Caledonian Thistle	A	0–2		

=== Scottish Cup ===
Round	Date	Opponent	H/A	Score	Clydebank Scorer(s)	Attendance
R3	29 January	Stirling Albion	H	1–0		
R4	19 February	Hibernian	A	1–1		
R4 R	29 February	Hibernian	H	0–3		
