= Drew Harvey =

Scottish footballer

Personal information
- Full name: Andrew Harvey
- Date of birth: 28 May 1955 (age 71)
- Position: Forward

Youth career
- Ashfield

Senior career*
Years	Team	Apps	(Gls)
1971–1974	Clydebank	12	(2)
1975–1978	Dumbarton	12	(2)
1978–1982	Stranraer	123	(17)
- * Club domestic league appearances and goals

Andrew 'Drew' Harvey (born 28 May 1955) was a Scottish footballer who played for Clydebank, Dumbarton and Stranraer.
