= Gerry O'Brien =

Scottish footballer

Personal information
- Date of birth: 10 November 1949 (age 76)
- Place of birth: Glasgow, Scotland
- Height: 5 ft 6 in (1.68 m)
- Position: Winger

Youth career
- Drumchapel Amateurs

Senior career*
Years	Team	Apps	(Gls)
1968–1970	Clydebank	60	(8)
1970–1976	Southampton	78	(2)
1974	→ Bristol Rovers (loan)	3	(0)
1976–1977	Swindon Town	27	(0)
1977–1978	Clydebank	24	(1)
1978–1979	Hibernian	7	(0)
- * Club domestic league appearances and goals

Gerald O'Brien (born 10 November 1949) is a Scottish retired professional footballer, who played as a winger for various clubs in Scotland and England in the 1960s and 1970s, including Clydebank, Southampton and Swindon Town.

== Career ==
=== Early career ===
O'Brien was born in Glasgow and trained as a bricklayer, playing his youth football with Drumchapel Amateurs before joining local club Clydebank in May 1968. At Clydebank, he was only a part-time professional but was spotted by Southampton's scout (and former player) Campbell Forsyth. O'Brien was also attracting interest from Coventry City and Nottingham Forest so the Saints' manager Ted Bates travelled to Glasgow himself to watch him (in a 1–1 draw with East Fife). Bates liked what he saw and signed O'Brien that same evening for £22,500, a then record for the Scottish Second Division.

=== Southampton ===
He made his Division One debut at The Dell on 11 March 1970 in a 1–0 defeat by Liverpool replacing the injured Terry Paine on the right wing. Bates had justified the large fee to the board of directors claiming that once O'Brien trained full-time, "he could become a younger version of Paine".

According to Chalk & Holley, "the little Scotsman was a clever, skilful player who at times looked capable of turning a game completely, although his slight build appeared to handicap him." After a few intermittent appearances, he replaced Brian O'Neil at inside-right in December 1971 and retained his place for the rest of the season. He scored one of his few goals against Derby County on 8 January 1972 with shot from outside the area. At the start of the next season, O'Neil regained his place and O'Brien again spent much of his time in the reserves.

He spent the end of the 1973–74 season on loan to Bristol Rovers before returning to Southampton for the start of the 1974 season. Although not a regular first team player, he was selected for a Texaco Cup match at Ibrox against Rangers on 18 September 1974, and scored the third goal, a tap in from inside the box. It was not until November 1974 that he again had a long spell in the Southampton first team (now in the Second Division) with a run of fifteen games, this time replacing Paul Gilchrist. He scored his second league goal with a header against Cardiff City on 22 April 1975. He retained his place for the start of the following season, but then lost his place to his good friend and fellow Glaswegian, Hugh Fisher. His only involvement for the rest of the season was as a substitute, including appearances in the FA Cup fourth and fifth round matches against Blackpool and West Bromwich Albion.

In March 1976, he was offered a move to Swindon Town and accepted what he described as "a good offer" from manager Danny Williams. In his seven years with the Saints, he made a total of 96 appearances, scoring three goals.

=== Later career ===
His move to Swindon was not a great success, missing a lot of games as a result of a cartilage injury. In 1977, he was given a free transfer back to Clydebank before finishing his career at Hibernian, quitting football in 1979 with arthritis.

== Life after football ==
After leaving football, he started a building business in Glasgow before settling in Duntocher, in West Dunbartonshire with his wife, Maureen and has two sons. After a hip replacement, he is now a regular golfer.
