= 1992–93 Scottish Second Division =

Scottish Second Division
- Season: 1992–93
- Champions: Clyde
- Promoted: Clyde; Brechin City

The 1992–93 Scottish Second Division was won by Clyde who, along with second placed Brechin City, were promoted to the First Division. Albion Rovers finished bottom.

== Table ==
Pos	Team	Pld	W	D	L	GF	GA	GD	Pts	Promotion
1	Clyde (C, P)	39	22	10	7	77	42	+35	54	Promotion to the First Division
2	Brechin City (P)	39	23	7	9	62	32	+30	53	Promotion to the First Division
3	Stranraer	39	19	15	5	69	44	+25	53	
4	Forfar Athletic	39	18	10	11	74	54	+20	46	
5	Alloa Athletic	39	16	12	11	63	54	+9	44	
6	Arbroath	39	18	8	13	59	50	+9	44	
7	Stenhousemuir	39	15	10	14	59	48	+11	40	
8	Berwick Rangers	39	16	7	16	56	64	−8	39	
9	East Fife	39	14	10	15	70	64	+6	38	
10	Queen of the South	39	12	9	18	57	72	−15	33	
11	Queen's Park	39	8	12	19	51	73	−22	28	
12	Montrose	39	10	7	22	46	71	−25	27	
13	East Stirlingshire	39	8	9	22	50	85	−35	25	
14	Albion Rovers	39	6	10	23	36	76	−40	22	

Source: "1992-1993 Second Division - SPFL Archive". SPFL.
Rules for classification: 1) points; 2) goal difference; 3) number of goals scored.
(C) Champions; (P) Promoted
