= Peter Kane (footballer) =

Scottish footballer

Personal information
- Full name: Peter Kane
- Date of birth: 4 April 1939 (age 87)
- Place of birth: Glasgow, Scotland
- Position: Inside left

Senior career*
Years	Team	Apps	(Gls)
- Petershill
1957–1958	Hamilton Academical	2	(1)
1958	Stirling Albion	1	(1)
1958–1959	Queen's Park	17	(7)
1959–1960	Northampton Town	28	(16)
1960–1963	Arsenal	4	(1)
1963–1964	Northampton Town	18	(8)
1964–1967	Crewe Alexandra	83	(31)
1967–1970	St Mirren	87	(36)
1970–1972	Clydebank	57	(29)
1972–1974	Barrow		
1974	Albion Rovers	1	(0)
1974–1975	Clydebank	16	(5)
- Vale of Leven
Total		314	(135)

International career
1959	Great Britain	1	(3)
- * Club domestic league appearances and goals

Peter Kane (born 4 April 1939) is a Scottish former professional footballer who played as an inside left.

== Club career ==
Born in Glasgow, Kane played throughout Scotland and England for a number of clubs including Petershill, Hamilton Academical, Stirling Albion, Queen's Park, Northampton Town, Arsenal, Crewe Alexandra, St Mirren, Clydebank, Barrow, Albion Rovers and Vale of Leven.

== Representative career ==
Kane made one friendly appearance for Great Britain, scoring a hattrick in a 7–3 win over a Caribbean XI on 10 October 1959.
