= Brian Wright (Scottish footballer) =

Scottish footballer and manager

Personal information
- Full name: Brian Wright
- Date of birth: 5 October 1958 (age 68)
- Place of birth: Glasgow, Scotland
- Position: Midfielder

Senior career*
Years	Team	Apps	(Gls)
1976–1986	Hamilton Academical	277	(27)
1986–1987	Motherwell	74	(6)
1987–1989	Clydebank	64	(6)
1989–1990	Partick Thistle	45	(5)
1990–1992	Clydebank	58	(5)
1992–1993	Queen of the South	25	(0)
Total		543	(49)

Managerial career
- 1993–1997: Clydebank
- * Club domestic league appearances and goals

Brian Wright (born 5 October 1958 in Drumchapel) is a Scottish former football player and manager. Wright played for Hamilton Academical, Motherwell, Clydebank, Partick Thistle and Queen of the South. After retiring as a player he managed Clydebank.
