= Bill Munro =

Scottish footballer and manager (1934–2023)

William Davidson Munro (21 June 1934 – 5 October 2023) was a Scottish football player and manager.

== Career ==
Born in Glasgow on 21 June 1934, Bill Munro played for Kilmarnock, Barrow and East Stirlingshire. He was appointed manager of Clydebank, owned by the Steedman family who had previously owned East Stirlingshire while Munro was a player there. Munro guided Clydebank to promotion to the Scottish Premier Division in 1977. He later managed Airdrie and also worked in women's football (at Cumbernauld Ladies).

== Death ==
Munro died on 5 October 2023, at the age of 89.

== Honours ==
Clydebank

- Scottish First Division promotion 1976–77
- Stirlingshire Cup : 1978–79, 1979–80
