= Sammy Henderson =

Scottish footballer and manager

Personal information
- Date of birth: 25 November 1944 (age 81)
- Place of birth: Glasgow
- Position: Right half

Youth career
- Ashfield

Senior career*
Years	Team	Apps	(Gls)
1963–1967	Celtic	2	(0)
1967–1973	Stirling Albion	159	(8)
1973–1976	Clydebank	73	(3)
Total		234	(11)

Managerial career
- 1981–1988: Clydebank
- * Club domestic league appearances and goals

Samuel Henderson (born 25 November 1944) is a Scottish former footballer who played for Celtic, Stirling Albion and Clydebank in the Scottish Football League. After retiring as a player he became a coach at Clydebank and was later their manager. As manager, Henderson helped Clydebank win promotion to the Scottish Premier Division in 1985.
