= Jim Fallon (footballer) =

Scottish footballer and manager

James Fallon (born 24 March 1950) is a Scottish former footballer and manager. He played 619 Scottish Football League matches for Clydebank, going on to manage them and also Dumbarton.

Fallon became manager of Dumbarton in 1995. The club were relegated to the Scottish Second Division in 1996. He resigned in 1996. Fallon won one home game in his fourteen months in charge, overall winning two games.

He was replaced by former player Ian Wallace.

== Managerial statistics ==
As of November 1996

Team	Nat	From	To	Record				
Team	Nat	From	To	G	W	D	L	Win %
Clydebank	(Scotland)	August 1988	May 1993	233	86	63	84	36.91
Dumbarton	(Scotland)	September 1995	November 1996	50	2	6	42	4.00

- Stirlingshire Cup games not included.

== Honours ==
Dumbarton

- Stirlingshire Cup: 1995–96

== See also ==
- List of footballers in Scotland by number of league appearances (500+)
