= Bayview Park, Methil =

Former football stadium in Fife, Scotland

Bayview Park
- Location within Fife
- Location: Methil, Fife, Scotland
- Coordinates: 56.18708°N 3.01315°W
- Owner: East Fife F.C.
- Surface: Grass

Construction
- Opened: 1902
- Closed: 1998

Tenants
- Leven Thistle F.C. (1902–1903); East Fife F.C. (1903–1998)

Bayview Park was a football stadium in the town of Methil, Fife, Scotland. It was the home ground of East Fife F.C. from their formation in 1903 until they moved to the new Bayview Stadium in 1998.

== History ==
The ground was previously known as Town Hall Park when it became the home of a local junior club, Leven Thistle, in 1902. When East Fife were formed in 1903 as a new senior club to represent the Levenmouth area, they took over the venue, which subsequently led to the demise of Leven Thistle. Town Hall Park was renamed as Bayview Park (due to its location near Largo Bay) and reopened with a match against Heart of Midlothian on 15 August 1903.

Bayview became fully enclosed with a 400-seat grandstand in 1906, but soon afterwards doubts about the ground's future viability were raised because of plans to build a new school nearby. This ultimately led to the pitch being moved several yards to the west in 1910, with the outcome that the stand – previously situated halfway along the north touchline – was now at the northeast corner of the pitch. After several attempts, East Fife were elected to the Scottish Football League in 1921 and Bayview staged its first League match against Bathgate on 20 August that year. Ambitious plans to develop the ground had already been announced; a new main stand was opened on the south side of the pitch in 1922, however it held only a third of the 3,000 spectators envisaged in the original plan. The banking around the pitch was terraced in 1923, at which time it was estimated that 20,000 standing spectators could be accommodated "in comfort". Further improvements followed promotion to Division One in 1930.

East Fife's Scottish Cup win in 1938 ushered in the club's most successful era. Bayview was again improved and expanded in 1948, and a record attendance of 22,515 was present for a local derby against Raith Rovers in 1950. Floodlights were installed in 1954 and first used in a friendly against Leeds United. The club, however, were relegated in 1958 and both East Fife and Bayview went into decline over the subsequent decades.

By the end of the 1970s attendances had dropped significantly, and the club was experiencing severe financial difficulties. Bayview's town centre location made it attractive to developers, and in 1995 the club agreed to sell the site in a deal that would provide them with a modern all-seater stadium. The site of the new Bayview Stadium was found on derelict land near Methil Docks, and East Fife finally left their original home in May 1998, at the end of the 1997-98 season, after 95 years, moving to their new stadium when the new season began in August 1998.

== Greyhound racing ==
Greyhound racing started at Bayview Park on 30 May 1934 and racing distances consisted of 240, 310, 330 and 510 yards including handicaps. The track was independent (unlicensed) for 27 years before closing in 1961.

== See also ==
- Stadium relocations in Scottish football
