= Stair Park =

Stadium in Dumfries and Galloway, Scotland

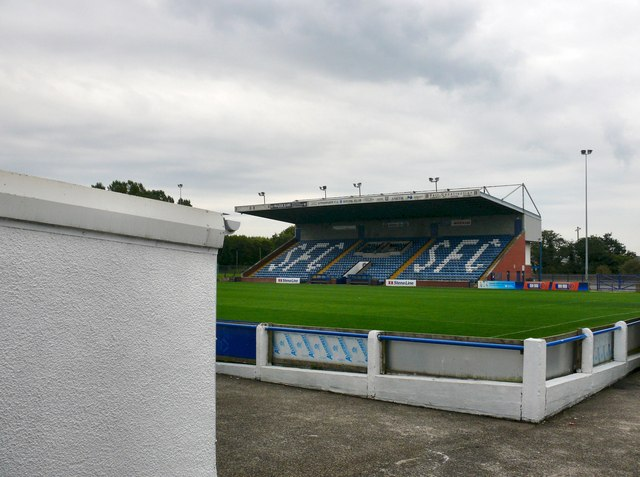

- Location in Dumfries and Galloway
- Location: Stranraer, Scotland
- Coordinates: 54°54′08″N 5°00′45″W
- Owner: Dumfries and Galloway Council
- Capacity: 4,178 (1,830 seated)
- Surface: Grass
- Field size: 103 x 64 metres

Construction
- Opened: 1907

Tenant
- Stranraer Football Club

Stair Park is a public park and football stadium in the town of Stranraer, Scotland and is the home of Stranraer F.C. It is owned by Dumfries and Galloway Council and is situated next to the London Road and the railway line in the town. The park features a bandstand, all weather tennis & netball courts, skatepark, football pitch and a football stadium. The park and stadium were named after the Earl of Stair, who bequeathed the land to the local authorities.

A stand was first constructed for football in 1932. The record attendance of 6,000 was set by a Scottish Cup tie against Rangers in 1948. When Stranraer entered the Scottish Football League in 1955, a terrace cover was erected, called the Shed. There were no significant further changes until 1981, when Stair Park became the last ground in league football in either England or Scotland to install floodlights. Stair Park was significantly improved in the 1990s. 300 seats were installed in the Shed, then a new main stand with 1,524 seats was constructed. This cost £520,000 to build, with the club committee raising £120,000 of the cost and the rest financed by grants from the Football Trust and the district council.

There is not normally segregation at Stranraer matches, but there are 2,000 places for away fans. When there is no segregation away fans normally settle down in the Coo Shed. Dumfries and Galloway Council restricted the capacity of Stair Park to 4,178 in July 2013, potentially affecting a 2013–14 Scottish League One match against Rangers.
