= Kilbowie Park =

Football stadium in Clydebank, Scotland

- Location in West Dunbartonshire
- Location: Clydebank, West Dunbartonshire, Scotland
- Coordinates: 55°54′22.0″N 4°23′57.9″W
- Surface: Grass
- Record attendance: 14,900; E.S. Clydebank v Hibernian; 10 February 1965

Construction
- Opened: 1939
- Closed: 1996

Tenants
- Clydebank Juniors ES Clydebank Clydebank: 1939–1964; 1964–1965; 1965–1996

Kilbowie Park, also known as New Kilbowie Park, was a football stadium in Clydebank, Scotland. It was the home ground of Clydebank.

New Kilbowie was built for Clydebank Juniors in 1939. In 1964, Clydebank merged with East Stirlingshire and entered the Scottish Football League. A record attendance of 14,900 was set by a visit of Hibernian in February 1965. Floodlights were first used in a match against Sunderland in the same month. The merger collapsed after a legal battle, but Clydebank entered the league in their own right in 1966.

Clydebank were promoted to the Premier Division in 1977. A covered plastic-seated stand was built, which was funded by selling star player Davie Cooper for £100,000 to Rangers. To avoid having to apply legislation affecting stadium safety, the club installed wooden benches that reduced the capacity to 9,950. This was below the 10,000 limit at which the legislation started to apply.

Clydebank played their last competitive game at Kilbowie against Hamilton Academical in 1996 (1-3). The last game at Kilbowie was a testimonial match later that summer for Ken Eadie, against Rangers (2-3). The ground was sold by club owners, the Steedman family, in 1997. Clydebank endured several seasons groundsharing at Cappielow in Greenock and Boghead Park in Dumbarton.

Land was purchased on Great Western Road on the outskirts of the town to construct a new stadium for the club, but the necessary approval was never obtained. The sale of Kilbowie Park was the catalyst for the club's decline, which was finally ended in 2002. The club was purchased from its administrator by Jim Ballantyne, who moved it to Airdrie, North Lanarkshire and renamed it Airdrie United. This was done to replace the Airdrieonians club, which had been liquidated earlier in 2002. Clydebank F.C. was reformed as a junior club by the United Clydebank Supporters and it now plays at Holm Park in Yoker.

Kilbowie was purchased by Vico Properties plc, who developed a retail scheme and restaurants on the ground. A single piece of rubble of the old stadium is now on view at the Scottish Football Museum in Hampden Park.

== See also ==
- Stadium relocations in Scottish football
