= 1987–88 Celtic F.C. season =

Celtic
1987–88 season
- Chairman: Jack McGinn
- Manager: Billy McNeill
- Ground: Celtic Park; Glasgow, Scotland
- Scottish Premier Division: 1st (champions)
- Scottish League Cup: Quarter final
- UEFA Cup: First round
- Scottish Cup: Winners
- Top goalscorer: League: Andy Walker (26); All: Andy Walker (32)
- Highest home attendance: 61,927 vs Dundee (23 April 1988)
- Lowest home attendance: 11,381 vs Falkirk (28 October 1987)
- Average home league attendance: 33,199
Home colours

The 1987–88 Scottish Football League was Celtic's 94th season of competitive football, and it marked the club's centenary. Davie Hay was dismissed as manager during the close season following a disappointing 1986-87 campaign, in which the team, despite holding a 9-point lead at the turn of the year, lost the league title to a resurgent Rangers under Graeme Souness and failed to win any trophies.

The Celtic board opted to bring back Billy McNeill as manager, despite an acrimonious split in 1983. McNeill returned to the club after four years managing in England with Manchester and Aston Villa.

The playing squad underwent significant changes in the summer of 1987, with key players such as Brian McClair, Mo Johnston, Murdo MacLeod, and Alan McInally all departing. Danny McGrain was given a free transfer, and Davie Provan retired due to ill health. Centre-half Mick McCarthy was signed by Davie Hay just days before his departure. Billy McNeill then brought in new signings, including Motherwell striker Andy Walker, Sheffield Wednesday full-back Chris Morris, and Aberdeen midfielder Billy Stark.

As the season progressed, Celtic continued to search for attacking reinforcements following the loss of strikers Johnston and McClair. After early speculation about a return for fans' favorite Charlie Nicholas, the club eventually signed forwards Frank McAvennie and Joe Miller.

Celtic made a solid start to their league campaign, but in the autumn, they were knocked out of the UEFA Cup by Borussia Dortmund in the first round and eliminated from the Scottish League Cup at the quarter-final stage by Aberdeen. Despite these setbacks, their league form remained consistent, and they went into the New Year derby match with a three-point lead over second-placed Hearts and a five-point lead over Rangers. After defeating Rangers, Celtic went on an unbeaten run until a potential league-clinching match against Hearts at Tynecastle in April, where a defeat meant they had to wait until the following week to secure the title.

In front of a packed home crowd at Celtic Park, Celtic clinched the league title with a convincing victory over Dundee. The team also reached the Scottish Cup Final after a dramatic comeback against Hearts in the semi-final, scoring twice in the last four minutes to win 2–1. In the final, Celtic again came from behind to defeat Dundee United, with Frank McAvennie scoring the decisive goal in the last minute, sealing a league and cup double in the club's centenary year.

== Pre-season and friendlies ==
Celtic prepared for their 1987-88 centenary season with a Scandinavian tour, before playing a friendly match at home against ex-Celtic player Charlie Nicholas Arsenal team and then Tommy Burns testimonial match against Liverpool. In November Celtic organised a testimonial for retired former player David Provan, who retired from the game through illness at the age of just 31.

19 July 1987 Friendly	IFK Stromstad	3-0	Celtic	Strömstad, Sweden

21 July 1987 Friendly	Varbergs BoIS	0-0	Celtic	Varberg, Sweden

23 July 1987 Friendly	Tidaholms GIF	1–2	Celtic	Tidaholm, Sweden
		Report	Archdeacon 15' Walker 25'	Attendance: 700

26 July 1987 Friendly	Moss FK	0–2	Celtic	Moss, Norway
		Report	Shepherd 88'	Stadium: Melløs Stadion

28 July 1987 Friendly	IK Oddevold	1–4	Celtic	Uddevalla, Sweden
		Report	Walker 7' Whyte 27' Walker 43' Walker 44'	Stadium: Rimnersvallen

1 August 1987 Friendly	Celtic	1-5	Arsenal	Glasgow, Scotland
	Archdeacon 89'	Report		Stadium: Celtic Park; Attendance: 26,195; Referee: A.Ferguson (Giffnock)

9 August 1987 Tommy Burns Testimonial	Celtic	0–1	Liverpool	Glasgow, Scotland
		Report	Whelan 38'	Stadium: Celtic Park; Attendance: 43,000; Referee: Kenny Hope (Clarkston)

30 November 1987 Davie Provan Testimonial	Celtic	1–3	Nottingham Forest	Glasgow, Scotland
19:45 BST	McCarthy 23'	Report		Stadium: Celtic Park; Attendance: 42,464; Referee: David Syme (Rutherglen)

== Competitions ==
=== Scottish Premier Division ===
==== League table ====
Pos	Team	Pld	W	D	L	GF	GA	GD	Pts	Qualification or relegation
1	Celtic (C)	44	31	10	3	79	23	+56	72	Qualification for the European Cup first round
2	Heart of Midlothian	44	23	16	5	74	32	+42	62	Qualification for the UEFA Cup first round
3	Rangers	44	26	8	10	85	34	+51	60	Qualification for the UEFA Cup first round
4	Aberdeen	44	21	17	6	56	25	+31	59	Qualification for the UEFA Cup first round
5	Dundee United	44	16	15	13	54	47	+7	47	Qualification for the Cup Winners' Cup first round

Source: Statto
Rules for classification: 1) points; 2) goal difference; 3) number of goals scored.
(C) Champions

==== Matches ====
8 August 1987 Premier League	Morton	0–4	Celtic	Greenock
15:00		Sunday Mail	McGhee 13'; Stark 53'; Walker 61' 68'	Stadium: Cappielow Park; Attendance: 14,174

12 August 1987 Premier League	Celtic	1–0	Hearts	Glasgow
19:30	McGhee 87'	Daily Record		Stadium: Celtic Park; Attendance: 27,825

15 August 1987 Premier League	Celtic	4–1	Motherwell	Glasgow
15:00	McGhee 31'; Walker 36' 82'; Stark 78'	The Sunday Post	Kirk 74'	Stadium: Celtic Park; Attendance: 24,478

22 August 1987 Premier League	Dunfermline Athletic	2–1	Celtic	Dunfermline
15:00	Robertson 2'; Ferguson 57'	Sunday Mail	Walker 33' (pen.)	Stadium: East End Park; Attendance: 17,292

29 August 1987 Premier League	Celtic	1–0	Rangers	Glasgow
15:00 GMT	Stark 4'	Sunday Mail		Stadium: Celtic Park; Attendance: 60,178

5 September 1987 Premier League	Dundee United	0–0	Celtic	Dundee
15:00 GMT		Sunday Mail		Stadium: Tannadice Park; Attendance: 16,403

12 September 1987 Premier League	Falkirk	0–1	Celtic	Falkirk
15:00 GMT		Evening Times	Burns 33'	Stadium: Brockville Park; Attendance: 14,319

19 September 1987 Premier League	Celtic	2–2	Aberdeen	Glasgow
15:00 GMT	Burns 38'; Stark 48'	Sunday Mail	P. Nicholas 60'; J. Miller 89'	Stadium: Celtic Park; Attendance: 36,957

26 September 1987 Premier League	St Mirren	0–1	Celtic	Paisley
15:00 GMT		Evening Times	Whyte 74'	Stadium: St Mirren Park, Love Street; Attendance: 18,011

3 October 1987 Premier League	Celtic	1–1	Hibernian	Glasgow
15:00 GMT	Walker 4'	Evening Times	Watson 79'	Stadium: Celtic Park; Attendance: 29,802

7 October 1987 Premier League	Dundee	1–1	Celtic	Dundee
19:30 GMT	Angus 44'	Glasgow Herald	Walker 70' (pen.)	Stadium: Dens Park; Attendance: 13,238

10 October 1987 Premier League	Celtic	3–1	Morton	Glasgow
19:30 GMT	Whyte 2'; McAvennie 11'; Walker 18'	Evening Times	O'Hara 40'	Stadium: Celtic Park; Attendance: 20,940

17 October 1987 Premier League	Rangers	2 – 2	Celtic	Glasgow
15:00 GMT	McCoist 65'; Gough 90'	Sunday Telegraph	Walker 33'; Butcher 35' (o.g.)	Stadium: Ibrox Park; Attendance: 43,486

24 October 1987 Premier League	Celtic	1–2	Dundee United	Glasgow
15:00 GMT	Shepherd 90'	Evening Times	Clark 79'; Ferguson 88'	Stadium: Celtic Park; Attendance: 28,982

28 October 1987 Premier League	Celtic	3–2	Falkirk	Glasgow
19:30 GMT	Archdeacon 31'; Stark 48' 80'	Glasgow Herald	Stewart 85'; Manley 87'	Stadium: Celtic Park; Attendance: 11,381; Referee: P. Hanley

31 October 1987 Premier League	Aberdeen	0–1	Celtic	Aberdeen
15:00 GMT		Sunday Mail	McAvennie 72'	Stadium: Pittodrie Stadium; Attendance: 20,562

7 November 1987 Premier League	Hearts	1–1	Celtic	Edinburgh
15:00 GMT	Colquhoun 40'	Sunday Post	McGhee 78'	Stadium: Tynecastle Park; Attendance: 28,992; Referee: J. McCluskey

14 November 1987 Premier League	Celtic	5–0	Dundee	Glasgow
15:00 GMT	Walker 2' 5'; Miller 60'; McAvennie 67' 89'	Sunday Mail		Stadium: Celtic Park; Attendance: 29,749; Referee: D. Miller

17 November 1987 Premier League	Motherwell	0–2	Celtic	Motherwell
19:30 GMT		Glasgow Herald	Walker 33'; Whyte 50'	Stadium: Fir Park; Attendance: 17,003; Referee: D. Hope

21 November 1987 Premier League	Celtic	4–0	Dunfermline Athletic	Glasgow
15:00 GMT				Stadium: Celtic Park; Attendance: 26,534

25 November 1987 Premier League	Celtic	1–0	St Mirren	Glasgow
19:30 GMT				Stadium: Celtic Park; Attendance: 24,718

28 November 1987 Premier League	Hibernian	0–1	Celtic	Edinburgh
15:00 GMT				Stadium: Easter Road; Attendance: 23,055

5 December 1987 Premier League	Morton	0–4	Celtic	Greenock
15:00 GMT				Stadium: Cappielow Park; Attendance: 12,552

12 December 1987 Premier League	Celtic	2–2	Hearts	Glasgow
15:00 GMT				Stadium: Celtic Park; Attendance: 42,004

19 December 1987 Premier League	Celtic	0–0	Aberdeen	Glasgow
15:00 GMT				Stadium: Celtic Park; Attendance: 35,711

22 December 1987 Premier League	Falkirk	0–2	Celtic	Falkirk
19:30 GMT				Stadium: Brockville Park; Attendance: 11,144

26 December 1987 Premier League	Dundee United	1–2	Celtic	Dundee
15:00 GMT				Stadium: Tannadice Park; Attendance: 18,465

2 January 1988 Premier League	Celtic	2–0	Rangers	Glasgow
15:00 GMT				Stadium: Celtic Park; Attendance: 60,106

9 January 1988 Premier League	St Mirren	1–1	Celtic	Paisley
15:00 GMT				Stadium: St Mirren Park, Love Street; Attendance: 19,030

16 January 1988 Premier League	Celtic	2–0	Hibernian	Glasgow
15:00 GMT				Stadium: Celtic Park; Attendance: 34,896

6 February 1988 Premier League	Celtic	1–0	Motherwell	Glasgow
15:00 GMT				Stadium: Celtic Park; Attendance: 23,035

13 February 1988 Premier League	Dundee	1–2	Celtic	Dundee
15:00 GMT				Stadium: Dens Park; Attendance: 17,101

27 February 1988 Premier League	Celtic	1–0	Morton	Glasgow
15:00 GMT				Stadium: Celtic Park; Attendance: 21,116

2 March 1988 Premier League	Dunfermline Athletic	0–4	Celtic	Dunfermline
19:30 GMT				Stadium: East End Park; Attendance: 17,367

5 March 1988 Premier League	Celtic	2–0	Falkirk	Glasgow
15:00 GMT				Stadium: Celtic Park; Attendance: 21,711

20 March 1988 Premier League	Rangers	1–2	Celtic	Glasgow
15:00 GMT				Stadium: Ibrox Stadium; Attendance: 42,850

26 March 1988 Premier League	Celtic	0–0	Dundee United	Glasgow
15:00 GMT				Stadium: Celtic Park; Attendance: 32,934

30 March 1988 Premier League	Aberdeen	0–1	Celtic	Aberdeen
19:30 GMT				Stadium: Pittodrie Stadium; Attendance: 21,688

2 April 1988 Premier League	Hibernian	0–2	Celtic	Edinburgh
15:00 GMT				Stadium: Easter Road; Attendance: 19,357

5 April 1988 Premier League	Celtic	2–0	St Mirren	Glasgow
19:30 GMT				Stadium: Celtic Park; Attendance: 41,465

16 April 1988 Premier League	Hearts	2–1	Celtic	Edinburgh
15:00 GMT				Stadium: Tynecastle Park; Attendance: 25,144

23 April 1988 Premier League	Celtic	3–0	Dundee	Glasgow
15:00 GMT				Stadium: Celtic Park; Attendance: 61,927

30 April 1988 Premier League	Motherwell	0–1	Celtic	Motherwell
15:00 GMT				Stadium: Fir Park; Attendance: 13,874

7 May 1988 Premier League	Celtic	1–0	Dunfermline Athletic	Glasgow
15:00 GMT				Stadium: Celtic Park; Attendance: 38,482

=== Scottish Cup ===
30 January 1988 Third round	Celtic	1–0	Stranraer	Glasgow
15:00 GMT				Stadium: Celtic Park; Attendance: 21,625

21 February 1988 Fourth round	Celtic	0–0	Hibernian	Glasgow
15:00 GMT				Stadium: Celtic Park; Attendance: 30,537

24 February 1988 Fourth round replay	Hibernian	0–1	Celtic	Edinburgh
19:30 GMT				Stadium: Easter Road; Attendance: 24,000

12 March 1988 Fifth round	Partick Thistle	0–3	Celtic	Glasgow
15:00 GMT				Stadium: Firhill Park; Attendance: 46,348

9 April 1988 Semi-final	Celtic	2–1	Hearts	Glasgow
15:00 GMT				Stadium: Hampden Park; Attendance: 66,646

14 May 1988 Final	Celtic	2–1	Dundee United	Glasgow
15:00 GMT				Stadium: Hampden Park; Attendance: 68,090

=== Scottish League Cup ===
19 August 1987 Second round	Celtic	3–1	Forfar Athletic	Glasgow
19:30 GMT				Stadium: Celtic Park; Attendance: 13,711

26 August 1987 Third round	Dumbarton	1–5	Celtic	Dumbarton
19:30 GMT				Stadium: Boghead Park; Attendance: 9,429

1 September 1987 Quarter Finals	Aberdeen	1–0	Celtic	Aberdeen
19:30 GMT				Stadium: Pittodrie Stadium; Attendance: 21,539

=== UEFA Cup ===
15 September 1987 1st round 1st leg	Celtic (Scotland)	2–1	(West Germany) Borussia Dortmund	Glasgow
20:00 GMT				Stadium: Celtic Park; Attendance: 41,400

30 September 1987 1st round 2nd leg	Borussia Dortmund (West Germany)	2–0 (3–2 agg.)	(Scotland) Celtic	Dortmund
20:00 GMT				Stadium: Westfalenstadion; Attendance: 54,000

=== Glasgow Cup ===
3 November 1987 Glasgow Cup Semi-final	Queen's Park	0–2	Celtic	Glasgow
19:30 GMT		Glasgow Herald	Burns 65'; Archdeacon 80' (pen.)	Stadium: Hampden Park; Referee: G. Evans

=== Competition overview ===
Competition	First match	Last match	Starting round	Final position	Record							
Competition	First match	Last match	Starting round	Final position	Pld	W	D	L	GF	GA	GD	Win %
Premier Division	8 August 1987	7 May 1988	Round 1	Winners	44	31	10	3	79	23	+56	70.45
Scottish Cup	30 January 1988	14 May 1988	Third round	Winners	6	5	1	0	9	3	+6	83.33
League Cup	19 August 1987	1 September 1987	Second Round	Quarter Finals	3	2	0	1	8	3	+5	66.67
UEFA Cup	15 September 1987	30 September 1987	First Round	First Round	2	1	0	1	2	3	−1	50.00
Total					55	39	11	5	98	32	+66	70.91

Source: Competitions

== Statistics ==
=== Appearances and goals ===
Pos.		Name	League		Scottish Cup		League Cup		UEFA Cup		Other		Total	
Pos.		Name	Apps	Goals	Apps	Goals	Apps	Goals	Apps	Goals	Apps	Goals	Apps	Goals
GK	(Republic of Ireland)	Pat Bonner	32	0	5	0	1	0	0	0	1	0	39	0
GK	(Northern Ireland)	Allen McKnight	12	0	1	0	2	0	2	0	0	0	17	0
DF	(Scotland)	Roy Aitken	43	1	6	0	3	0	2	0	0	0	54	1
DF	(Scotland)	Lex Baillie	14	0	3	0	0	0	0	0	0	0	17	0
DF	(Scotland)	Stuart Balmer	0	0	0	0	0	0	0	0	1	0	1	0
DF	(Republic of Ireland)	Mick McCarthy	23	0	3	0	0	0	1	0	1	0	28	0
DF	(Scotland)	Paul McGugan	2	0	0	0	2	0	0	0	0	0	4	0
DF	(Republic of Ireland)	Chris Morris	44	3	6	0	3	0	2	0	0	0	55	3
DF	(Northern Ireland)	Anton Rogan	31	1	4	0	3	0	2	0	1	0	41	1
DF	(Scotland)	Derek Whyte	41	3	5	0	2	0	2	1	1	0	51	4
MF	(Scotland)	Tommy Burns	25	2	5	1	3	1	2	0	1	1	36	5
MF	(Scotland)	Peter Grant	37	2	3	0	2	0	2	0	0	0	44	2
MF	(Scotland)	Paul McStay	44	5	6	0	2	0	2	0	0	0	54	5
MF	(Scotland)	Steven Murray	0	0	0	0	0	0	0	0	1	0	1	0
MF	(Scotland)	Tony Shepherd	4	1	0	0	1	0	1	0	1	0	7	1
MF	(Scotland)	Billy Stark	37	8	5	2	3	3	2	0	0	0	47	13
MF	(Scotland)	Owen Archdeacon	9	1	0	0	0	0	1	0	1	1	11	2
FW	(Scotland)	Frank McAvennie	32	15	6	3	0	0	0	0	1	0	39	18
FW	(Scotland)	Dugald McCarrison	1	0	0	0	0	0	0	0	0	0	1	0
FW	(Scotland)	Mark McGhee	21	6	4	1	3	1	1	0	1	0	30	8
FW	(Scotland)	Dougie McGuire	1	0	0	0	0	0	1	0	0	0	2	0
FW	(Scotland)	Joe Miller	26	3	6	0	0	0	0	0	0	0	32	3
FW	(Scotland)	Andy Walker	42	26	4	2	3	3	2	1	0	0	51	32

=== Goalscorers ===
R	Pos.	Nation	Name	Premier Division	Scottish Cup	League Cup	UEFA CUP	Total
1	FW	(Scotland)	Andy Walker	26	2	3	1	32
2	FW	(Scotland)	Frank McAvennie	15	3	0	0	18
3	FW	(Scotland)	Billy Stark	8	2	3	0	13
4	FW	(Scotland)	Mark McGhee	6	1	1	0	8
5	MF	(Scotland)	Paul McStay	5	0	0	0	5
6	MF	(Scotland)	Tommy Burns	2	1	1	0	4
6	DF	(Scotland)	Derek Whyte	3	0	0	1	4
7	FW	(Scotland)	Joe Miller	3	0	0	0	3
7	DF	(Republic of Ireland)	Chris Morris	3	0	0	0	3
8	MF	(Scotland)	Peter Grant	2	0	0	0	2
9	DF	(Scotland)	Roy Aitken	1	0	0	0	1
9	MF	(Scotland)	Owen Archdeacon	1	0	0	0	1
9	MF	(Scotland)	Tony Shepherd	1	0	0	0	1
9	DF	(Northern Ireland)	Anton Rogan	1	0	0	0	1
Total				77	9	8	2	97

== Club ==
=== Officials ===
Position	Name
Chairman	Jack McGinn
Vice-chairman	Kevin Kelly
Secretary	Chris White
Directors	James Farrell Tom Grant Chris White

=== Management ===
Position	Name
Manager	Billy McNeill
Assistant manager	Tommy Craig
Reserve Team Manager	Bobby Lennox
Youth Development Officer	Benny Rooney
Chief Scout	John Kelman
Physio	Brian Scott
Masseur	Jimmy Steele
Kitman	Neil Mochan

=== Kit ===
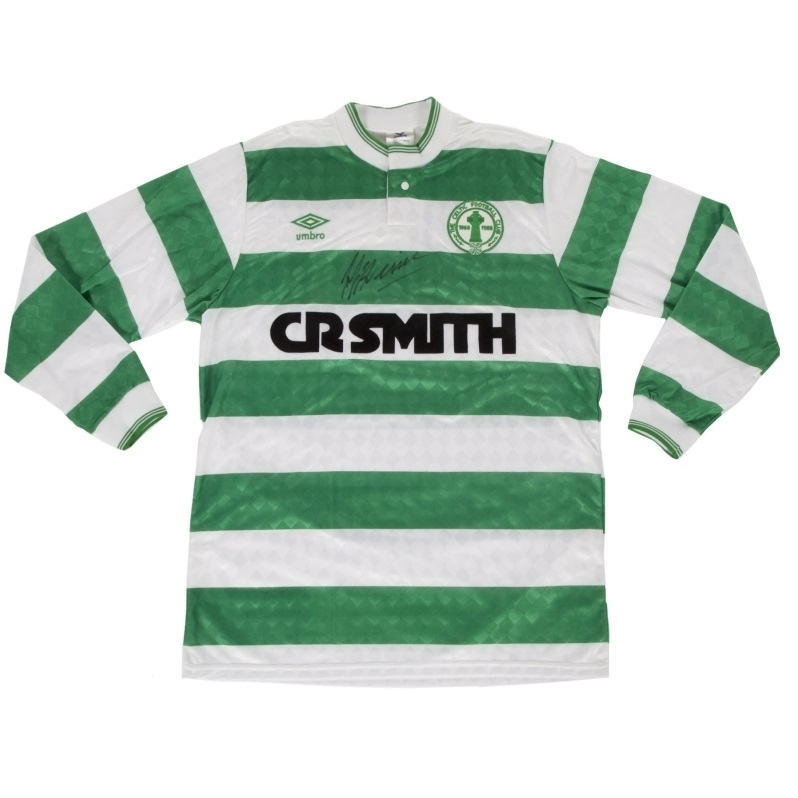
Celtic Home Shirt 1987 - 1989

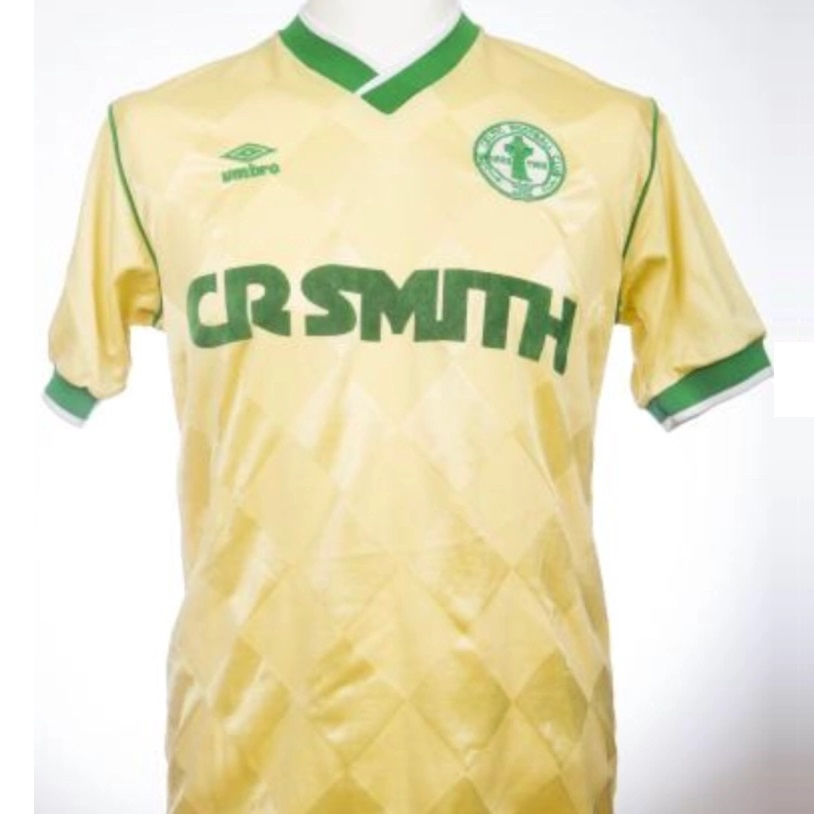
Celtic Away Shirt 1987-88

Supplier: Umbro / Sponsor: CR Smith

The club introduced a new home shirt to commemorate the clubs centenary year, with a newly commissioned badge to celebrate the milestone, the yellow and green away shirt was the same as the previous season but with the new centenary badge replacing the usual shamrock badge for this season.

== Transfers ==
=== In ===
Pos	Player	From	Type	Date	Fee
DF	(Republic of Ireland) Mick McCarthy	(England) Manchester City	Transfer	May 1987	£500,000
MF	(Scotland) Billy Stark	(Scotland) Aberdeen	Transfer	July 1987	£75,000
DF	(Republic of Ireland) Chris Morris	(England) Sheffield Wednesday	Transfer	July 1987	£125,000
FW	(Scotland) Andy Walker	(Scotland) Motherwell	Transfer	July 1987	£350,000
GK	(Scotland) Andy Murdoch	(Scotland) Johnstone Burgh	Transfer	September 1987	Free
MF	(Scotland) Steven Murray	(England) Nottingham Forest	Transfer	September 1987	£50,000
MF	(Scotland) Charlie Christie	(Scotland) Inverness Caledonian	Transfer	September 1987	£20,000
FW	(Scotland) Frank McAvennie	(England) West Ham United	Transfer	October 1987	£750,000
FW	(Scotland) Joe Miller	(Scotland) Aberdeen	Transfer	November 1987	£650,000
			TOTAL		£2,575,000

=== Out ===
Pos	Player	From	Type	Date	Fee
DF	(Scotland) Danny McGrain	(Scotland) Hamilton Academical	Transfer	May 1987	Free Transfer
MF	(Scotland) Murdo MacLeod	(Germany) Borussia Dortmund	Transfer	June 1987	£250,000
GK	(England) Peter Latchford	(Scotland) Clyde	Transfer	June 1987	Free Transfer
FW	(Scotland) Mo Johnston	(France) FC Nantes	Transfer	July 1987	£330,000
FW	(Scotland) Alan McInally	(England) Aston Villa	Transfer	July 1987	£250,000
FW	(Scotland) Brian McClair	(England) Manchester United	Transfer	July 1987	£850,000
FW	(Scotland) David Provan	Retired	Transfer	July 1987	Released
FW	(Scotland) Mark Smith	(Scotland) Dunfermline Athletic	Transfer	October 1987	£50,000
DF	(Scotland) Paul McGugan	(England) Barnsley	Transfer	October 1987	£55,000
			TOTAL		£1,785,000

== See also ==
- List of Celtic F.C. seasons
