= Paul McStay =

Scottish footballer

Paul McStay MBE
Personal information
- Full name: Paul Michael Lyons McStay
- Date of birth: 22 October 1964 (age 62)
- Place of birth: Hamilton, Scotland
- Height: 1.78 m (5 ft 10 in)
- Position: Midfielder

Youth career
- Celtic Boys Club
- 1981–1982: Celtic

Senior career*
Years	Team	Apps	(Gls)
1981–1997	Celtic	515	(57)

International career
1978–1980	Scotland U16	16	(5)
1980–1982	Scotland U18	14	(5)
1982–1984	Scotland U21	5	(1)
1983–1984	Scotland U20	7	(3)
1983–1997	Scotland	76	(9)
1990	SFA (SFL centenary)	1	(0)
Medal record
Scotland
UEFA European U-18 Championship
Winner	1982 Finland	Team competition
- * Club domestic league appearances and goals

Paul Michael Lyons McStay, MBE (born 22 October 1964) is a Scottish former professional footballer who spent his entire career with Celtic, making his senior debut in 1982 and retiring in 1997. He captained both Scotland and Celtic at all age levels. He was capped 76 times for his country and scored nine goals. He helped Celtic win three league titles, the last in 1988.

== Club career ==
As a youth, McStay first came to prominence in June 1980 in a schoolboy international match when Scotland played England at Wembley. Then 15, McStay captained the Scotland team, scored two goals and was awarded Man of the Match after Scotland ran out 5–4 winners.

McStay signed for Celtic aged sixteen from Celtic Boys Club in 1981. He made his first team debut on 23 January 1982 in a 4–0 win over Queen of the South in the Scottish Cup. A week later on 30 January, he made his first league appearance in 3–1 win over Aberdeen at Pittodrie. He scored the third goal, taking a pass from George McCluskey, running through the Aberdeen defence and striking a left foot shot past Jim Leighton in goal.

Season 1982–83 saw the young midfielder establish himself as a first team regular, and he picked up his first winners medal on 4 November 1982 in Celtic's 2–1 win over Rangers in the League Cup Final. His performances resulted in media speculation that Inter Milan were considering making a £2 million bid to take him to Italy, a rumour that was emphatically dismissed by the Celtic chairman, Desmond White.

McStay continued to progress at Celtic, and he scored Celtic's equaliser in the 1984 Scottish Cup Final against Aberdeen to take the match into extra time. However, Celtic had played most of the match with 10 men after Roy Aitken was sent off in the first half, and Aberdeen scored in extra time to win 2–1.

In December 1987, during Celtic's centenary season, McStay signed a five-year contract at Celtic. He went on to enjoy his finest season, winning both the SPFA and Scottish Football Writers player of the year awards as the club won a League and Cup double in 1988.

When Roy Aitken left Celtic Park in 1990, McStay was appointed club captain, a position he retained until his retirement following the 1996–97 season. In his time with the club, Celtic won the League title three times, the Scottish Cup four times and the League Cup once. Although the second half of McStay's career coincided with a time when Celtic performed poorly and struggled financially, in 2002 he was voted a member of Celtic's greatest ever team by the club's fans. He is also a member of the Scotland Football Hall of Fame, which honours the best players to play in Scotland and is located in the Scottish Football Museum.

== International career ==
In 1982 he captained Scotland national U19 team to victory in the UEFA European Under-18 Championship, the only major trophy won by any Scotland national team. He captained each of the Scotland teams from under-16 level through under-18, under-20, under-21 and senior level. McStay made his full international debut for Scotland in 1983. He represented Scotland 76 times, including appearances at two World Cups in 1986 and 1990, during a 14-year international career. McStay was also selected for two UEFA European Championships in 1992 and 1996, but withdrew from the latter because of an ankle injury.

McStay held the record for the youngest man to reach 50 caps for Scotland for nearly 36 years, until he was surpassed by Billy Gilmour on 6 October 2026.

== Personal life ==
In 2010, McStay moved to live in Sydney, Australia with his wife Anne Marie and their six children. He now runs Maestro Sports, a startup software company specialising in sport coaching and management. McStay attempted to raise $100,000 AUD to fund an autobiography through the crowdfunding platform Kickstarter.

McStay's great-uncles Jimmy and Willie McStay were former Celtic captains, and his brothers Willie and Raymond also played for Celtic. Their father John worked as a scout for the club.

One of his sons, Chris, has played football for Sutherland Sharks and Rockdale Ilinden in Australia and for Clyde in Scotland. His nephew John (Willie's son) played with Celtic Boys Club before moving onto Motherwell under-19s and later played for Ayr United as a defender before becoming a Celtic academy coach.

His cousin Jock McStay played for Raith Rovers during the 1990s, and Jock's son Jonny played at Junior level in the 2010s.

== Career statistics ==
=== Club ===
Appearances and goals by club, season and competition
Club	Season	League			Scottish Cup		League Cup		Europe		Total	
Club	Season	Division	Apps	Goals	Apps	Goals	Apps	Goals	Apps	Goals	Apps	Goals
Celtic	1981–82	Scottish Premier; Division	10	1	2	0	0	0	0	0	12	1
Celtic	1982–83	Scottish Premier; Division	36	6	4	0	9	1	4 (Note: Appearances in European Cup)	0	53	7
Celtic	1983–84	Scottish Premier; Division	34	3	5	2	8	2	6 (Note: Appearances in UEFA Cup)	0	53	7
Celtic	1984–85	Scottish Premier; Division	32	4	7	3	2	0	5 (Note: Appearances in European Cup Winners' Cup)	1	46	8
Celtic	1985–86	Scottish Premier; Division	34	8	2	0	2	1	2	0	40	9
Celtic	1986–87	Scottish Premier; Division	43	3	4	0	5	1	4	0	56	4
Celtic	1987–88	Scottish Premier; Division	44	5	6	0	2	0	2	0	54	5
Celtic	1988–89	Scottish Premier; Division	33	5	5	0	3	0	4	0	45	5
Celtic	1989–90	Scottish Premier; Division	35	3	6	1	4	1	2	0	47	5
Celtic	1990–91	Scottish Premier; Division	30	2	5	0	5	1	–		40	3
Celtic	1991–92	Scottish Premier; Division	32	7	4	0	0	0	2	0	38	7
Celtic	1992–93	Scottish Premier; Division	43	4	3	0	3	0	4	1	53	5
Celtic	1993–94	Scottish Premier; Division	35	2	1	0	4	0	4	0	44	2
Celtic	1994–95	Scottish Premier; Division	29	1	4	0	5	0	–		38	1
Celtic	1995–96	Scottish Premier; Division	30	2	4	0	1	0	3	0	38	2
Celtic	1996–97	Scottish Premier; Division	15	1	4	0	1	0	1 (Note: Appearance in UEFA Champions League)	0	21	1
Career total			515	57	66	6	54	7	43	2	678	72

=== International ===
Appearances and goals by national team and year
National team	Year	Apps	Goals
Scotland	1983	4	0
Scotland	1984	5	2
Scotland	1985	4	0
Scotland	1986	5	1
Scotland	1987	8	2
Scotland	1988	7	1
Scotland	1989	8	0
Scotland	1990	9	0
Scotland	1991	3	1
Scotland	1992	10	2
Scotland	1993	5	0
Scotland	1994	3	0
Scotland	1995	1	0
Scotland	1996	1	0
Scotland	1997	3	0
Total		76	9

Scores and results list Scotland's goal tally first, score column indicates score after each McStay goal.

List of international goals scored by Paul McStay
No.	Date	Venue	Opponent	Score	Result	Competition
1	17 October 1984	Hampden Park, Glasgow	Iceland	1–0	3–0	1986 World Cup qualification
2	17 October 1984	Hampden Park, Glasgow	Iceland	2–0	3–0	1986 World Cup qualification
3	28 January 1986	National Stadium, Ramat Gan	Israel	1–0	1–0	Friendly
4	1 April 1987	Constant Vanden Stock Stadium, Brussels	Belgium	1–1	1–4	UEFA Euro 1988 qualifying
5	14 October 1987	Hampden Park, Glasgow	Belgium	2–0	2–0	UEFA Euro 1988 qualifying
6	14 September 1988	Ullevaal Stadion, Oslo	Norway	1–0	2–1	1990 FIFA World Cup qualification
7	13 November 1991	Hampden Park, Glasgow	San Marino	1–0	4–0	UEFA Euro 1992 qualifying
8	25 March 1992	Hampden Park, Glasgow	Finland	1–0	1–1	Friendly
9	18 June 1992	Idrottsparken, Norrköping	CIS	1–0	3–0	UEFA Euro 1992

== Honours ==
Celtic

- Scottish Premier Division: 1981–82, 1985–86, 1987–88; runner-up: 1982–83, 1983–84, 1984–85, 1986–87, 1995–96, 1996–97
- Scottish Cup: 1984–85, 1987–88, 1988–89, 1994–95; runner-up 1983–84, 1989–90
- Scottish League Cup: 1982–83; runner-up 1983–84, 1986–87 1990–91, 1994–95
- Dubai Champions Cup: 1989
- Glasgow Cup: 1981–82

Scotland

- Rous Cup: 1985; runner-up: 1986, 1989

Scotland U18

- UEFA Youth Championship: 1982

Scotland U16

- Victory Shield: 1980
- Dentyne Trophy: 1980

Individual

- SFWA Footballer of the Year: 1987–88
- SPFA Players' Player of the Year: 1987–88
- SPFA Young Player of the Year: 1982–83
- Scotland national football team roll of honour : 1990
- Scottish Football Hall of Fame: 2010
- Ballon d'Or: 1984 (18th place)

== See also ==
- List of footballers in Scotland by number of league appearances (500+)
- List of Scotland national football team captains
