= Joe Miller (footballer, born 1967) =

Scottish footballer and manager

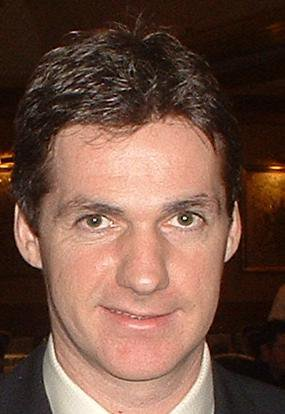

Personal information
- Full name: Joseph Miller
- Date of birth: 8 December 1967 (age 58)
- Place of birth: Glasgow, Scotland
- Positions: Winger; striker

Youth career
- St Marys Boys Club
- Celtic Boys Club
- 1983–1985: Aberdeen

Senior career*
Years	Team	Apps	(Gls)
1984–1987	Aberdeen	62	(13)
1987–1993	Celtic	151	(27)
1993–1998	Aberdeen	145	(19)
1998–2000	Dundee United	24	(2)
2000–2001	Parramatta Power	24	(9)
2001	Raith Rovers	5	(1)
2002	Clydebank	3	(0)
2005–2007	Clyde	16	(2)
Total		430	(73)

International career
1987–1988	Scotland U21	5	(1)

Managerial career
- 2006–2007: Clyde
- 2009: Dundalk (assistant)
- * Club domestic league appearances and goals

Joseph Miller (born 8 December 1967 in Glasgow) is a Scottish retired footballer and a former manager of Scottish Football League club Clyde.

He began his playing career as a teenage striker at Aberdeen, featuring in their 1985–86 Scottish Cup success, before moving to Celtic in 1987 for £650,000, a Scottish record transfer fee. Mainly used as a winger from then on, Miller won the 'double' of Scottish League and Scottish Cup with Celtic in 1988, and scored the winning goal for the club in the 1989 Scottish Cup Final. In 1993 he returned to Aberdeen, collecting another winner's medal in the 1995 Scottish League Cup Final to complete a domestic set.

In his later career he had shorter spells with Dundee United, in Australia (spending a season with Parramatta Power in the NSL), Raith Rovers, Clydebank and Clyde, moving into coaching with the latter.

== Playing career ==
=== Aberdeen ===
Miller was raised in the East End of Glasgow, attended St Mungo's Academy and grew up supporting Celtic; his father (also Joseph) had been a professional footballer with Hamilton Academical and Swindon Town. He was a 12-year-old playing for St Marys Boys Club in the Calton (the same team which produced Tommy Burns) when Alex Ferguson, the manager of Aberdeen, was alerted to his talents through Miller's uncle who had previously worked as a scout for Ferguson. He signed provisionally for Aberdeen while continuing to play in Glasgow for Celtic Boys Club, a team with close ties to the professional club and coached by legendary player Jimmy Johnstone, but not formally connected to them. The Celtic manager Billy McNeill did make approaches to sign Miller, but on the advice of his father and due to the keenness of Ferguson he chose to stick with Aberdeen who had a good track record of developing young players, including many from Glasgow such as Willie Miller (no relation) who had grown up in the same area.

After moving to Pittodrie Stadium in summer 1983, Miller made his Aberdeen debut just after his 17th birthday, coming on as a substitute in a league fixture against Dundee United in December 1984. That was his only appearance of the season, which ended with the club retaining the league title. Miller remained with the youth team and was in the side which won the Scottish Youth Cup in 1985 alongside Stevie Gray, David Robertson and Paul Wright. The final was against Celtic at Pittodrie. After trailing 3–0, Miller netted a 35-yard lob to tie the match at 3–3. The comeback was complete in extra-time to secure the trophy with a 5–3 win.

Around a year after he made his debut, Miller became a regular in the Aberdeen team, finishing with 19 league games and three goals during 1985–86; he also featured in the quarter-final of the European Cup against IFK Gothenburg and came off the bench in the 1986 Scottish Cup Final victory over Hearts. At that time he was usually playing as a striker.

He played one more full season for the Dons with his form attracting attention from around Europe – Miller has stated teams from Spain and Italy showed an interest in signing him, along with Liverpool who were coached by his childhood hero Kenny Dalglish, and Manchester United where Alex Ferguson was now the manager. However it was Celtic and Billy McNeill, who had just returned to the club, who would secure the 19-year-old's signature in November 1987 (a few weeks after he appeared in the League Cup final, lost on penalties) for a fee of £650,000, which at that time was a Scottish record as well as the highest fee paid for a teenager. Miller left Aberdeen having played 81 times and scored 21 goals in all competitions, with his last appearance a UEFA Cup defeat to Feyenoord.

=== Celtic ===
Miller immediately became an important player for Celtic after making his debut against Dundee, scoring the third goal of a 5–0 victory. Playing as a right winger providing chances for forwards such as Mark McGhee and fellow new signings Andy Walker and Frank McAvennie, the side won the league and Scottish Cup double in 1987–88, their centenary season; Miller has described this as his "best memory".

Celtic failed to keep their grip on the league title in 1989, dropping to 3rd place as Old Firm rivals Rangers began what would be a period of dominance, and were also eliminated from the European Cup by Werder Bremen. Miller missed much of the season with a virus. However the Hoops were able to retain the Scottish Cup, with Miller scoring the winning goal in the final against Rangers at Hampden Park to end their hopes of a treble. That match was the third in a row in which he had been used as a striker and scored the only goal of the game, but with new strikers Coyne and Dziekanowski arriving, 'Super Joe' as he had become known, returned to his previous wing role.

The following campaign began badly as Miller, having come on as a substitute for his first appearance of the season during the 1989–90 Scottish League Cup semi-final – a loss to former club Aberdeen – was himself substituted, prompting a furious reaction as he returned to the bench. Miller was "devastated" and submitted a transfer request, but this was rejected by the club. He retained his place in the side, although the season finished without a trophy after Aberdeen again prevailed in the 1990 Scottish Cup Final (albeit Miller was named man of the match), while in the league they could only finish 5th.

By this point, Celtic were experiencing one of the most difficult spells in their history, and 1990–91 brought further disappointment, with no trophies and a League Cup Final defeat to Rangers. In 1991–92, new manager Liam Brady continued to select Miller but results deteriorated further, with defeats to Airdrie in the League Cup, Neuchâtel Xamax in the UEFA Cup and Rangers in the Scottish Cup (despite David Robertson having been sent off in the opening minutes for a challenge on Miller, breaking two of his ribs).

By 1992–93, another campaign which would bring not even as much as a final for Celtic, Miller was often only being selected as a substitute with Brady's own signing Stuart Slater being preferred. At the end of the season he returned to Aberdeen, having made a total of 199 appearances in his spell at Celtic Park, scoring 32 goals.

=== Return to Aberdeen ===
Although Aberdeen were no longer the dominant force in Scotland as when he first joined in 1983, when Miller returned a decade later they were at least as strong a team as Celtic, having finished runners-up behind Rangers in three of the last four seasons. In 1993–94, with Miller a regular starter under manager and former teammate Willie Miller, another second-place finish was achieved. However the next season was a different matter, with the club losing to Stenhousemuir in the Scottish Cup and only escaping relegation thanks to four wins in the last five matches and a play-off win against Dunfermline.

In 1995–96 they regrouped under new manager Roy Aitken, Miller's former captain at Celtic, and finished third while also winning the 1995 Scottish League Cup Final with victory over Dundee. Miller returned what would be the best personal figures in his career, playing in 40 matches (all starts) and scoring 10 goals. He played with Aberdeen for two more unexceptional seasons, posting 70 further appearances. Coincidentally his final goal for the club came in a 3–0 win against a Hibernian team led by Billy McNeill, who was acting as caretaker manager for that match alone. His combined Aberdeen totals of 264 matches and 47 goals are both within the top 50 in the club's all-time list.

=== Later years ===
In summer 1998, 30-year-old Miller moved to Dundee United. He contributed 33 appearances – many from the bench – and two goals in his single season at Tannadice Park in which the team finished in mid-table and reached the Scottish Cup semi-final, being beaten by Celtic.

After being released from his contract, he then spent a season in Australia's National Soccer League, joining newly formed Parramatta Power for their inaugural season, before returning to Scotland for short spells with Raith Rovers (under another former teammate, Peter Hetherston, where he mentored a young Nacho Novo) and Clydebank, prior to retiring from the professional game in 2002 to train as a coach. He went back to Australia for a period, winning the amateur KDSA Cup with North Sydney in 2003.

Having been appointed assistant manager of Clyde in 2005, Miller re-registered as a player and made just over a dozen league appearances for the club in his late 30s.

=== International ===
Miller was selected five times for the Scotland under-21 team, by which time he was already an experienced player at club level. He never received a full cap for Scotland, with the tactics of the time under coach Andy Roxburgh rarely utilising wingers, plus a direct rival in Pat Nevin and several competitors for a place as a striker.

== Coaching and management ==
Miller joined Clyde in June 2005, initially as assistant to Graham Roberts, during which time they surprisingly defeated Celtic in the 2005–06 Scottish Cup. He was appointed manager in August 2006 following the departure of Roberts following a feud between the pair; Roberts later won a claim for unfair dismissal against the club.

He guided Clyde to the 2006 Scottish Challenge Cup Final, the club's first national final in nearly 40 years. Miller ended speculation about his future at Clyde in May 2007 by refusing to sign a new contract as manager, thus leaving the club.

In January 2009 Miller was signed up by Irish club Dundalk's manager Sean Connor as an assistant manager.

== Career statistics ==
=== Appearances and goals by club, season and competition ===
Club	Season	League			Scottish Cup		League Cup		Europe		Total	
Club	Season	Division	Apps	Goals	Apps	Goals	Apps	Goals	Apps	Goals	Apps	Goals
Aberdeen	1984-85	Scottish Premier Division	1	0	0	0	0	0	0	0	1	0
Aberdeen	1985-86	Scottish Premier Division	19	3	3	2	0	0	1	0	23	5
Aberdeen	1986-87	Scottish Premier Division	28	6	3	0	3	2	0	0	34	8
Aberdeen	1987-88	Scottish Premier Division	14	4	0	0	5	3	4	1	23	8
Aberdeen	Total		62	13	6	2	8	5	5	1	81	21
Celtic	1987-88	Scottish Premier Division	27	3	6	0	0	0	0	0	33	3
Celtic	1988-89	Scottish Premier Division	21	8	3	1	3	0	3	0	30	9
Celtic	1989-90	Scottish Premier Division	24	5	6	1	1	0	1	0	32	6
Celtic	1990-91	Scottish Premier Division	30	8	5	0	4	1	0	0	39	9
Celtic	1991-92	Scottish Premier Division	26	2	4	0	3	1	3	1	36	4
Celtic	1992-93	Scottish Premier Division	23	1	2	0	2	0	2	0	29	1
Celtic	Total		151	27	26	2	13	2	9	1	199	32
Aberdeen	1993-94	Scottish Premier Division	27	4	6	1	3	2	3	1	39	8
Aberdeen	1994-95	Scottish Premier Division	29	1	2	0	2	0	1	0	34	1
Aberdeen	1995-96	Scottish Premier Division	31	9	4	0	5	1	0	0	40	10
Aberdeen	1996-97	Scottish Premier Division	30	4	2	0	2	0	5	0	39	4
Aberdeen	1997-98	Scottish Premier Division	28	1	0	0	4	2	0	0	32	3
Aberdeen	Total		145	19	14	1	16	5	9	1	184	26
Dundee United	1998-99	SPL	24	2	7	0	2	0	0	0	33	2
Dundee United	Total		24	2	7	0	2	0	0	0	33	2
Parramatta Power	2000-01	National Soccer League	24	9	-	-	-	-	-	-	24+	9+
Parramatta Power	Total		24	9	-	-	-	-	-	-	24+	9+
Raith Rovers	2001-02	Scottish First Division	5	1	-	-	-	-	-	-	5+	1+
Raith Rovers	Total		5	1	-	-	-	-	-	-	5+	1+
Clydebank	2001-02	Scottish Second Division	3	0	-	-	-	-	-	-	3+	0+
Clydebank	Total		3	0	-	-	-	-	-	-	3+	0+
Clyde	2005-06	Scottish First Division	-	-	-	-	-	-	-	-	-	-
Clyde	2006-07	Scottish First Division	-	-	-	-	-	-	-	-	-	-
Clyde	Total		16	2	-	-	-	-	-	-	16+	2+
Career total			430	73	53+	5+	39+	12+	23	3	545+	93+

== Honours ==
Aberdeen

- Scottish Cup: 1985–86
- Scottish League Cup: 1995–96
  - Runners-up 1987–88
- Tennents' Sixes: 1986, 1987

Celtic

- Scottish Premier Division: 1987–88
- Scottish Cup: 1987–88, 1988–89
  - Runners-up 1989–90
- Scottish League Cup: Runners-up 1990–91
- Tennents' Sixes: 1992

Clyde

- Scottish Challenge Cup: Runners-up 2006–07
