= 1990–91 Celtic F.C. season =

Celtic
1990–91 season
- Chairman: Jack McGinn
- Manager: Billy McNeill
- Stadium: Celtic Park
- Scottish Premier Division: 3rd
- Scottish Cup: Semi-finalists
- Scottish League Cup: Finalists
- Top goalscorer: League: Tommy Coyne – 18; All: Tommy Coyne – 19
- Highest home attendance: 51,252
- Lowest home attendance: 14,284
- Average home league attendance: 29,012
Home colours

During the 1990–91 Scottish football season, Celtic competed in the Scottish Premier Division. After finishing 5th the previous season, the club missed out on European competition for the first time since the 1978–79 season. In preparation for the new campaign, manager Billy McNeill strengthened his squad by signing Arsenal winger Martin Hayes, former Celtic hero Charlie Nicholas, and rising star John Collins.

Celtic had a poor start to the league season, losing their first two matches. The team's form remained inconsistent despite a brief recovery, and by March 1991, the league title was already out of reach. A run of three consecutive defeats at the end of March and into early April ended any lingering hopes of a resurgence. Celtic would finish third behind Aberdeen and champions Rangers, who secured their third consecutive title under new manager Walter Smith.

In the 1990–91 Scottish League Cup, Celtic reached the final after overcoming lower-league opposition in the early rounds and defeating Dundee United in the semi-final. However, they lost in extra time to Rangers in the final, extending their trophy drought.

The 1990–91 Scottish Cup also brought disappointment. Celtic, aiming to reach their fourth consecutive final, gained a measure of hope with a famous St. Patrick's Day victory over rivals Rangers. However, a semi-final replay defeat to Motherwell dashed any remaining hopes of silverware for the 1990–91 season.

Following another trophyless campaign and after spending over £2 million on new signings, the board of directors dismissed Billy McNeill, ending his long-standing association with the club.

== Pre-season and friendlies ==
Celtic prepared for the 1990–91 season with a tour of Germany and Holland before travelling to Ireland to play in the Bohemian centenary celebration match. Celtic rounded off their preparations with a home friendly against Everton

4 August 1990 Friendly	Kickers Emden	2–2	Celtic	Emden, Germany
19:00 CET		Report

5 August 1990 Friendly	TSV Verden	1–3	Celtic	Verden, Germany
19:00 CET		Report

10 August 1990 Friendly	TSV Ottersberg	0–6	Celtic	Ottersberg, Germany
19:00 CET		Report

16 August 1990 Friendly	Bohemian	0–2	Celtic	Dublin, Ireland
19:30 BST		Report	Nicholas 67' 76'	Stadium: Dalymount Park; Attendance: 20,000

19 August 1990 Friendly	Celtic	2–2	Everton	Glasgow
15:00 BST	Miller 46' Elliott 75'	Report	Newell 6' 52'	Stadium: Celtic Park; Attendance: 43,554; Referee: Douglas Hope (Scotland)

== Competitions ==
=== Scottish Premier Division ===
==== League table ====
Pos	Team	Pld	W	D	L	GF	GA	GD	Pts	Qualification or relegation
1	Rangers (C)	36	24	7	5	62	23	+39	55	Qualification for the European Cup first round
2	Aberdeen	36	22	9	5	62	27	+35	53	Qualification for the UEFA Cup first round
3	Celtic	36	17	7	12	52	38	+14	41	Qualification for the UEFA Cup first round
4	Dundee United	36	17	7	12	41	29	+12	41	
5	Heart of Midlothian	36	14	7	15	48	55	−7	35	

Source: Statto.com
Rules for classification: 1) points; 2) goal difference; 3) number of goals scored.
(C) Champions

==== Matches ====
25 August 1990 Premier League	Motherwell	2–0	Celtic	Motherwell
15:00	Russell 75'; Arnott 79'			Stadium: Fir Park; Attendance: 17,652

1 September 1990 Premier League	Celtic	0–3	Aberdeen	Glasgow
15:00			Mason 53'; Connor 59'; Gillhaus 67'	Stadium: Celtic Park; Attendance: 45,222

8 September 1990 Premier League	Celtic	2–0	Hibernian	Glasgow
15:00				Stadium: Celtic Park; Attendance: 29,464

15 September 1990 Premier League	Rangers	1–1	Celtic	Glasgow
15:00				Stadium: Ibrox Stadium; Attendance: 38,543

22 September 1990 Premier League	Celtic	3–0	Hearts	Glasgow
15:00 GMT				Stadium: Celtic Park; Attendance: 38,409

29 September 1990 Premier League	St Mirren	2–3	Celtic	Paisley
15:00 GMT				Stadium: St Mirren Park, Love Street; Attendance: 20,314

6 October 1990 Premier League	Celtic	0–0	St Johnstone	Glasgow
15:00 GMT				Stadium: Celtic Park; Attendance: 26,905

13 October 1990 Premier League	Dunfermline Athletic	1–1	Celtic	Dunfermline
15:00 GMT				Stadium: East End Park; Attendance: 16,053

20 October 1990 Premier League	Celtic	0–0	Dundee United	Glasgow
15:00 GMT				Stadium: Celtic Park; Attendance: 34,627

3 November 1990 Premier League	Aberdeen	3–0	Celtic	Aberdeen
15:00 GMT				Stadium: Pittodrie Stadium; Attendance: 20,496

6 November 1990 Premier League	Celtic	2–1	Motherwell	Glasgow
19:30 GMT				Stadium: Celtic Park; Attendance: 20,317

10 November 1990 Premier League	Hearts	1–0	Celtic	Edinburgh
15:00 GMT				Stadium: Tynecastle Park; Attendance: 19,189

17 November 1990 Premier League	Celtic	4–1	St Mirren	Glasgow
15:00 GMT				Stadium: Celtic Park; Attendance: 25,686

25 November 1990 Premier League	Celtic	1–2	Rangers	Glasgow
15:00 GMT				Stadium: Celtic Park; Attendance: 50,671

1 December 1990 Premier League	Hibernian	0–3	Celtic	Edinburgh
15:00 GMT				Stadium: Easter Road; Attendance: 16,219

8 December 1990 Premier League	Dundee United	3–1	Celtic	Dundee
15:00 GMT				Stadium: Tannadice Park; Attendance: 16,503

15 December 1990 Premier League	Celtic	1–2	Dunfermline Athletic	Glasgow
15:00 GMT				Stadium: Celtic Park; Attendance: 18,916

22 December 1990 Premier League	St Johnstone	3–2	Celtic	Perth
15:00 GMT				Stadium: McDiarmid Park; Attendance: 10,627

29 December 1990 Premier League	Celtic	1–1	Hearts	Glasgow
15:00 GMT				Stadium: Celtic Park; Attendance: 28,120

2 January 1991 Premier League	Rangers	2–0	Celtic	Glasgow
15:00 GMT				Stadium: Ibrox Stadium; Attendance: 38,399

5 January 1991 Premier League	Celtic	1–1	Hibernian	Glasgow
15:00 GMT				Stadium: Celtic Park; Attendance: 20,526

19 January 1991 Premier League	Celtic	1–0	Aberdeen	Glasgow
15:00 GMT				Stadium: Celtic Park; Attendance: 28,182

30 January 1991 Premier League	Motherwell	1–1	Celtic	Motherwell
19:30 GMT				Stadium: Fir Park; Attendance: 13,552

2 February 1991 Premier League	Celtic	1–0	Dundee United	Glasgow
15:00 GMT				Stadium: Celtic Park; Attendance: 26,172

2 March 1991 Premier League	Celtic	3–0	St Johnstone	Glasgow
15:00 GMT				Stadium: Celtic Park; Attendance: 24,561

6 March 1991 Premier League	Dunfermline Athletic	0–1	Celtic	Dunfermline
15:00 GMT				Stadium: East End Park; Attendance: 12,458

9 March 1991 Premier League	Hibernian	0–2	Celtic	Edinburgh
15:00 GMT				Stadium: Easter Road; Attendance: 13,323

12 March 1991 Premier League	St Mirren	0–2	Celtic	Paisley
19:30 GMT				Stadium: St Mirren Park, Love Street; Attendance: 12,675

24 March 1991 Premier League	Celtic	3–0	Rangers	Glasgow
15:00 GMT				Stadium: Celtic Park; Attendance: 51,252

30 March 1991 Premier League	Celtic	1–2	Motherwell	Glasgow
15:00 GMT				Stadium: Celtic Park; Attendance: 21,523

6 April 1991 Premier League	Aberdeen	1–0	Celtic	Aberdeen
15:00 GMT				Stadium: Pittodrie Stadium; Attendance: 19,815

13 April 1991 Premier League	Dundee United	2–1	Celtic	Dundee
15:00 GMT				Stadium: Tannadice Park; Attendance: 13,603

20 April 1991 Premier League	Celtic	5–1	Dunfermline Athletic	Glasgow
15:00 GMT				Stadium: Celtic Park; Attendance: 14,284

27 April 1991 Premier League	Hearts	0–1	Celtic	Edinburgh
15:00 GMT				Stadium: Tynecastle Park; Attendance: 17,075

5 May 1991 Premier League	Celtic	1–0	St Mirren	Glasgow
15:00 GMT				Stadium: Celtic Park; Attendance: 17,372

11 May 1991 Premier League	St Johnstone	2–3	Celtic	Perth
15:00 GMT				Stadium: McDiarmid Park; Attendance: 9,486

=== Scottish Cup ===
26 January 1991 Third round	Forfar Athletic	0–2	Celtic	Forfar
15:00 GMT				Stadium: Station Park; Attendance: 8,359

26 February 1991 Fourth round	Celtic	3–0	St Mirren	Glasgow
19:30 GMT				Stadium: Celtic Park; Attendance: 27,189

17 March 1991 Fifth round	Celtic	2–0	Rangers	Glasgow
15:00 GMT				Stadium: Celtic Park; Attendance: 52,286

3 April 1991 Semi-final	Motherwell	0–0	Celtic	Glasgow
19:30 GMT				Stadium: Hampden Park; Attendance: 41,765

9 April 1991 Semi-final replay	Motherwell	4–2	Celtic	Glasgow
20:00 GMT				Stadium: Hampden Park; Attendance: 31,371

=== Scottish League Cup ===
22 August 1990 Second round	Celtic	4–0	Ayr United	Glasgow
19:30 GMT				Stadium: Celtic Park; Attendance: 21,506

29 August 1990 Third round	Hamilton Academical	0–1	Celtic	Hamilton
19:30 GMT				Stadium: Douglas Park; Attendance: 9,168

5 September 1990 Quarter-finals	Celtic	2–1	Queen of the South	Glasgow
19:30 GMT				Stadium: Celtic Park; Attendance: 18,435

25 September 1990 Semi-finals	Dundee United	0–2	Celtic	Glasgow
19:30 GMT				Stadium: Hampden Park; Attendance: 49,975

28 October 1990 Finals	Celtic	1–2	Rangers	Glasgow
15:00 GMT				Stadium: Hampden Park; Attendance: 62,817

=== Competition overview ===
Competition	First match	Last match	Starting round	Final position	Record							
Competition	First match	Last match	Starting round	Final position	Pld	W	D	L	GF	GA	GD	Win %
Premier Division	25 August 1990	11 May 1991	Round 1	3rd	36	17	7	12	52	38	+14	47.22
Scottish Cup	26 January 1991	9 Abril 1991	Third round	Semi Finals	5	3	1	1	9	4	+5	60.00
League Cup	22 August 1990	28 October 1990	Second round	Runners Up	5	4	0	1	10	3	+7	80.00
Total					46	24	8	14	71	45	+26	52.17

Source: Soccerway

== Club ==
=== Club officials ===
Position	Name
Chairman	Jack McGinn
Vice-chairman	Kevin Kelly
Secretary	Chris White
Directors	Brian Dempsey (May 1990 until October 1990) James Farrell Tom Grant Michael Kelly Chris White
Chief executive	Terry Cassidy

=== Management ===
Position	Name
Manager	Billy McNeill
Assistant manager	Tommy Craig
Reserve Team Manager	Bobby Lennox
Youth Development Coordinator	Benny Rooney
Physio	Brian Scott
Masseur	Jimmy Steele
Kitman	Neil Mochan

=== Kit ===
Supplier: Umbro / Sponsors: CR Smith

This was the second season for both the home shirt and away shirts.

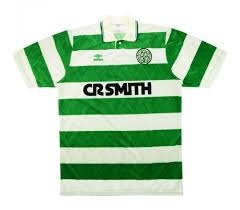
Celtic Home Shirt 1989 - 1991

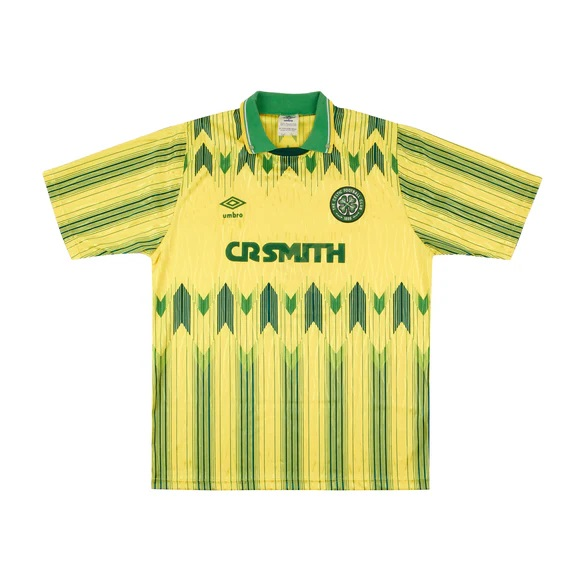
Celtic Away Shirt 1989 - 1991

== Transfers ==
=== In ===
Pos	Player	From	Type	Date	Transfer Fee
MF	(England) Martin Hayes	(England) Arsenal	Transfer	May 1990	£650,000
FW	(Scotland) Charlie Nicholas	(Scotland) Aberdeen	Transfer	July 1990	£450,000
MF	(Scotland) John Collins	(Scotland) Hibernian	Transfer	July 1990	£1,000,000
				Total Transfer Fees	£2,100,000

=== Out ===
Pos	Player	To	Type	Date	Transfer Fee
MF	(Scotland) Billy Stark	(Scotland) Kilmarnock	Transfer	June 1990	£50,000
FW	(Scotland) David Elliot	(Scotland) Partick Thistle	Transfer	July 1990	£75,000
DF	(Scotland) Stuart Balmer	(England) Charlton Athletic	Transfer	August 1990	£120,000
DF	(Scotland) Lex Baillie	(Canada) Toronto Blizzard	Loan	August 1990	Loan
FW	(Scotland) John Hewitt	(Scotland) Middlesbrough	Loan	September 1990	Loan
FW	(Scotland) Dugald McCarrison	(England) Ipswich Town	Loan	December 1990	Loan
MF	(Republic of Ireland) Declan Roche	(Scotland) Partick Thistle	Transfer	January 1991	Free
DF	(Scotland) Paul McLaughlin	(Scotland) Partick Thistle	Transfer	February 1991	£75,000
GK	(Scotland) Andy Murdoch	(Scotland) Partick Thistle	Transfer	February 1991	£75,000
		Total Transfer Fees			£395,000
