= 1988–89 Celtic F.C. season =

Celtic
1988–89 season
- Chairman: Jack McGinn
- Manager: Billy McNeill
- Stadium: Celtic Park
- Scottish Premier Division: 3rd
- Scottish Cup: Winners
- Scottish League Cup: Quarter-finalists
- European Cup: 2nd round
- Top goalscorer: League: Mark McGhee – 16; All: Mark McGhee – 19
- Highest home attendance: 60,613
- Lowest home attendance: 15,316
- Average home league attendance: 31,713
Home colours

During the 1988–89 Scottish football season, Celtic competed in the Scottish Premier Division.

== Competitions ==
=== Scottish Premier Division ===
==== League table ====
Pos	Team	Pld	W	D	L	GF	GA	GD	Pts	Qualification or relegation
1	Rangers (C)	36	26	4	6	62	26	+36	56	Qualification for the European Cup first round
2	Aberdeen	36	18	14	4	51	25	+26	50	Qualification for the UEFA Cup first round
3	Celtic	36	21	4	11	66	44	+22	46	Qualification for the Cup Winners' Cup first round
4	Dundee United	36	16	12	8	44	26	+18	44	Qualification for the UEFA Cup first round
5	Hibernian	36	13	9	14	37	36	+1	35	Qualification for the UEFA Cup first round

Source: Statto
Rules for classification: 1) points; 2) goal difference; 3) number of goals scored.
(C) Champions

==== Matches ====
13 August 1988 Premier League	Celtic	1–0	Hearts	Glasgow
15:00				Stadium: Celtic Park; Attendance: 44,881

20 August 1988 Premier League	Dundee United	1–0	Celtic	Dundee
15:00				Stadium: Tannadice Park; Attendance: 19,530

27 August 1988 Premier League	Rangers	5–1	Celtic	Glasgow
15:00				Stadium: Ibrox Stadium; Attendance: 42,858

3 September 1988 Premier League	Celtic	2–1	Hamilton Academical	Glasgow
15:00				Stadium: Celtic Park; Attendance: 22,384

17 September 1988 Premier League	Celtic	1–3	Aberdeen	Glasgow
15:00 GMT				Stadium: Celtic Park; Attendance: 34,757

24 September 1988 Premier League	Dundee	1–0	Celtic	Dundee
15:00 GMT				Stadium: Dens Park; Attendance: 15,546

28 September 1988 Premier League	Celtic	3–1	Motherwell	Glasgow
19:30 GMT				Stadium: Celtic Park; Attendance: 18,057

1 October 1988 Premier League	Hibernian	3–1	Celtic	Edinburgh
15:00 GMT				Stadium: Easter Road; Attendance: 22,808

8 October 1988 Premier League	Celtic	7–1	St Mirren	Glasgow
15:00 GMT				Stadium: Celtic Park; Attendance: 26,091

12 October 1988 Premier League	Celtic	1–0	Dundee United	Glasgow
19:30 GMT				Stadium: Celtic Park; Attendance: 34,896

22 October 1988 Premier League	Hearts	0–2	Celtic	Edinburgh
15:00 GMT				Stadium: Tynecastle Park; Attendance: 24,017

29 October 1988 Premier League	Celtic	2–3	Dundee	Glasgow
15:00 GMT				Stadium: Celtic Park; Attendance: 23,843

2 November 1988 Premier League	Aberdeen	2–2	Celtic	Aberdeen
19:30 GMT				Stadium: Pittodrie Stadium; Attendance: 21,218

5 November 1988 Premier League	Hamilton Academical	0–8	Celtic	Hamilton
15:00 GMT				Stadium: Douglas Park; Attendance: 10,710

12 November 1988 Premier League	Celtic	3–1	Rangers	Glasgow
15:00 GMT				Stadium: Celtic Park; Attendance: 60,613

19 November 1988 Premier League	Celtic	1–0	Hibernian	Glasgow
15:00 GMT				Stadium: Celtic Park; Attendance: 32,926

26 November 1988 Premier League	St Mirren	2–3	Celtic	Paisley
15:00 GMT				Stadium: St Mirren Park, Love Street; Attendance: 21,266

3 December 1988 Premier League	Motherwell	1–3	Celtic	Motherwell
15:00 GMT				Stadium: Fir Park; Attendance: 16,392

10 December 1988 Premier League	Celtic	0–0	Aberdeen	Glasgow
15:00 GMT				Stadium: Celtic Park; Attendance: 39,427

17 December 1988 Premier League	Dundee United	2–0	Celtic	Dundee
15:00 GMT				Stadium: Tannadice Park; Attendance: 18,745

31 December 1988 Premier League	Celtic	4–2	Hearts	Glasgow
15:00 GMT				Stadium: Celtic Park; Attendance: 41,555

3 January 1989 Premier League	Rangers	4–1	Celtic	Glasgow
15:00 GMT				Stadium: Ibrox Stadium; Attendance: 42,515

7 January 1989 Premier League	Celtic	2–0	Hamilton Academical	Glasgow
15:00 GMT				Stadium: Celtic Park; Attendance: 18,769

14 January 1989 Premier League	Celtic	2–1	St Mirren	Glasgow
15:00 GMT				Stadium: Celtic Park; Attendance: 24,879

21 January 1989 Premier League	Hibernian	1–3	Celtic	Edinburgh
15:00 GMT				Stadium: Easter Road; Attendance: 23,106

11 February 1989 Premier League	Celtic	1–2	Motherwell	Glasgow
15:00 GMT				Stadium: Celtic Park; Attendance: 21,445

25 February 1989 Premier League	Dundee	0–3	Celtic	Dundee
15:00 GMT				Stadium: Dens Park; Attendance: 14,548

11 March 1989 Premier League	Hearts	0–1	Celtic	Edinburgh
15:00 GMT				Stadium: Tynecastle Park; Attendance: 23,087

25 March 1989 Premier League	Celtic	1–0	Dundee United	Glasgow
15:00 GMT				Stadium: Celtic Park; Attendance: 34,795

1 April 1989 Premier League	Celtic	1–2	Rangers	Glasgow
15:00 GMT				Stadium: Celtic Park; Attendance: 60,171

8 April 1989 Premier League	Hamilton Academical	2–0	Celtic	Hamilton
15:00 GMT				Stadium: Douglas Park; Attendance: 9,031

12 April 1989 Premier League	Motherwell	2–2	Celtic	Motherwell
19:30 GMT				Stadium: Fir Park; Attendance: 10,507

22 April 1989 Premier League	Celtic	2–1	Dundee	Glasgow
15:00 GMT				Stadium: Celtic Park; Attendance: 16,105

29 April 1989 Premier League	Aberdeen	0–0	Celtic	Aberdeen
15:00 GMT				Stadium: Pittodrie Stadium; Attendance: 20,347

6 May 1989 Premier League	Celtic	1–0	Hibernian	Glasgow
15:00 GMT				Stadium: Celtic Park; Attendance: 15,316

13 May 1989 Premier League	St Mirren	0–1	Celtic	Paisley
15:00 GMT				Stadium: St Mirren Park, Love Street; Attendance: 13,257

=== Scottish Cup ===
28 January 1989 Third round	Celtic	2–0	Dumbarton	Glasgow
15:00 GMT				Stadium: Celtic Park; Attendance: 24,844

18 February 1989 Fourth round	Celtic	4–1	Clydebank	Glasgow
15:00 GMT				Stadium: Celtic Park; Attendance: 23,141

18 March 1989 Fifth round	Celtic	2–1	Hearts	Glasgow
15:00 GMT				Stadium: Celtic Park; Attendance: 46,348

16 April 1989 Semi-final	Celtic	3–1	Hibernian	Glasgow
15:00 GMT				Stadium: Hampden Park; Attendance: 42,188

20 May 1989 Final	Celtic	1–0	Rangers	Glasgow
15:00 GMT				Stadium: Hampden Park; Attendance: 72,079

=== Scottish League Cup ===
17 August 1988 Second round	Celtic	4–1	Ayr United	Glasgow
19:30 GMT				Stadium: Celtic Park; Attendance: 23,044

24 August 1988 Third round	Celtic	7–2	Hamilton Academical	Glasgow
19:30 GMT				Stadium: Celtic Park; Attendance: 21,109

31 August 1988 Quarter Finals	Dundee United	2–0	Celtic	Dundee
19:30 GMT				Stadium: Tannadice Park; Attendance: 21,140

=== European Cup ===
7 September 1988 1st round 1st leg	Honved (Hungary)	1–0	(Scotland) Celtic	Budapest
20:00 GMT				Stadium: Bozsik Stadion; Attendance: 8,000

5 October 1988 1st round 2nd leg	Celtic (Scotland)	4–0 (4–1 agg.)	(Hungary) Honved	Glasgow
20:00 GMT				Stadium: Celtic Park; Attendance: 42,763

26 October 1988 2nd round 1st leg	Celtic (Scotland)	0–1	(West Germany) Werder Bremen	Glasgow
20:00 GMT				Stadium: Celtic Park; Attendance: 50,624

8 November 1988 2nd round 2nd leg	Werder Bremen (West Germany)	0–0 (1–0 agg.)	(Scotland) Celtic	Bremen
20:00 GMT				Stadium: Weser-Stadion; Attendance: 38,980

=== Dubai Champions Cup ===
4 April 1989 Dubai Champions Cup	Celtic (Scotland)	1–1 (4–2 pen.)	(England) Liverpool	Dubai
20:00 GMT	McGhee 12'		Aldridge 74'	Stadium: Al Wasl Stadium; Attendance: 15,000

== Club Staff ==
Board of Directors
Position	Name
Chairman	Jack McGinn
Vice-chairman	Kevin Kelly
Secretary	Chris White
Directors	James Farrell Tom Grant Chris White

Football Staff
Position	Name
Manager	Billy McNeill
Assistant manager	Tommy Craig
Reserve Team Manager	Bobby Lennox
Youth Development Officer	Benny Rooney
Physio	Brian Scott
Masseur	Jimmy Steele
Kitman	Neil Mochan

== Transfers ==
Transfers In
Date	Player	From	Transfer Fee
July 1988	(England) Ian Andrews	(England) Leicester City	£300,000
August 1988	(Scotland) Alan Rough	(South Africa) Orlando Pirates	Free
January 1989	(Scotland) Steve McCahill	(Scotland) Dumbarton	£100,000
March 1989	(Scotland) Tommy Coyne	(Scotland) Dundee	£500,000

Transfers Out
Date	Player	To	Transfer Fee
July 1988	(Northern Ireland) Allen McKnight	(England) West Ham United	£250,000
August 1988	(Scotland) Dougie McGuire	(England) Coventry City	£40,000
December 1988	(Scotland) Alan Rough	(Scotland) Hamilton Academical	Free
March 1989	(Scotland) Frank McAvennie	(England) West Ham United	£1,250,000
