= Dubai Champions Cup =

Dubai Super Cup

Tournament details
- Host country: United Arab Emirates
- City: Dubai
- Teams: Two: (England) Football League champions (Scotland) Scottish Football League champions

The Dubai Champions Cup (originally called the Dubai Super Cup) was an unofficial/friendly annual association football match contested between the champions of the English and Scottish leagues. The competition took place for three consecutive seasons from 1986–87 to 1988–89 in the United Arab Emirates port of Dubai, during the time when English football clubs were banned from taking part in UEFA club competitions as a result of the Heysel Stadium disaster in 1985.

== History ==
The first match took place on 9 December 1986 at the Al Wasl Stadium between English champions Liverpool and Scottish champions Celtic. The match finished 1–1, with Liverpool winning 4–2 on a penalty shoot-out.

English champions Everton and Scottish champions Rangers played the match the following year in December 1987. Rangers came from two goals behind to level the match after 90 minutes at 2–2. This was despite referee Keith Cooper disallowing six goals for the Ibrox club during the game. Rangers went on to win 8–7 on penalty kicks.

The final match took place on 4 April 1989 at the Al-Nasar Stadium. The competition was now renamed the Dubai Champions Cup and featured the same sides that took part in 1986; Liverpool and Celtic. Once again the match finished level after 90 minutes, 1–1; this time Celtic won 4–2 on penalty kicks.

== 1986–87 ==
9 December 1986

Celtic (Scotland)	1–1	(England) Liverpool
Archdeacon 50'		Hansen 89'
Penalties
	2–4

Attendance: 15,000

GK	(Republic of Ireland) Pat Bonner
DF	(Scotland) Danny McGrain
DF	(Scotland) Roy Aitken
DF	(Republic of Ireland) Pierce O'Leary
DF	(Scotland) Derek Whyte
MF	(Scotland) Peter Grant
MF	(Scotland) Tony Shepherd
MF	(Scotland) Paul McStay
FW	(Scotland) Alan McInally
FW	(Scotland) Mark McGhee
FW	(Scotland) Owen Archdeacon
Substitutes:
DF	(Scotland) Willie McStay
FW	(Scotland) Mo Johnston
Manager:
(Scotland) Davie Hay

GK	(Zimbabwe) Bruce Grobbelaar
DF	(Scotland) Gary Gillespie
DF	(England) Barry Venison
DF	(Scotland) Alan Hansen
DF	(Republic of Ireland) Jim Beglin
MF	(Scotland) Steve Nicol
DF	(Republic of Ireland) Mark Lawrenson
MF	(England) Steve McMahon
MF	(Republic of Ireland) Ronnie Whelan
FW	(England) Paul Walsh
FW	(Wales) Ian Rush
Substitutes:
FW	(Scotland) Kenny Dalglish
Player/Manager:
(Scotland) Kenny Dalglish

== 1987–88 ==
8 December 1987

Rangers (Scotland)	2–2	(England) Everton
Fleck 80'; McCoist 87'		Sheedy 24'; Watson 65'
Penalties
	8–7

Attendance: 8,000
Referee: Keith Cooper

GK	(England) Chris Woods
DF	(Scotland) Scott Nisbet
DF	(England) Jimmy Phillips
DF	(England) Graham Roberts
MF	(England) Ray Wilkins
DF	(Scotland) Richard Gough
MF	(England) Trevor Francis
FW	(Scotland) Robert Fleck
FW	(Scotland) Ally McCoist
MF	(Scotland) Ian Durrant
MF	(Scotland) Derek Ferguson
Substitutes:
GK	(Scotland) Nicky Walker
DF	(Scotland) Stuart Munro
DF	(Northern Ireland) Jimmy Nicholl
MF	(Scotland) Dave MacFarlane
MF	(Scotland) Graeme Souness
MF	(Scotland) Davie Kirkwood
Player/Manager:
(Scotland) Graeme Souness

GK	(Wales) Neville Southall
DF	(England) Gary Stevens
DF	(England) Neil Pointon
DF	(Wales) Kevin Ratcliffe
DF	(England) Dave Watson
MF	(England) Peter Reid
MF	(England) Trevor Steven
FW	(England) Adrian Heath
FW	(Scotland) Graeme Sharp
MF	(England) Ian Snodin
MF	(Republic of Ireland) Kevin Sheedy
Substitutes:
MF	(Scotland) Ian Wilson
MF	(England) Neil Adams
GK	(England) Bobby Mimms
Manager:
(England) Colin Harvey

== 1988–89 ==
4 April 1989

Celtic (Scotland)	1–1	(England) Liverpool
McGhee 12'		Aldridge 74'
Penalties
	4–2

Attendance: 15,000
Referee: Neil Midgley

GK	(Republic of Ireland) Pat Bonner
DF	(Republic of Ireland) Chris Morris
DF	(Northern Ireland) Anton Rogan
DF	(Scotland) Steve McCahill
DF	(Republic of Ireland) Mick McCarthy
MF	(Scotland) Peter Grant
MF	(Scotland) Joe Miller
MF	(Scotland) Paul McStay
FW	(Republic of Ireland) Tommy Coyne
FW	(Scotland) Mark McGhee
MF	(Scotland) Steve Fulton
Substitutes:
GK	(England) Ian Andrews
DF	(Scotland) Lex Baillie
MF	(Scotland) Billy Stark
FW	(Scotland) Andy Walker
Manager:
(Scotland) Billy McNeill

GK	(Zimbabwe) Bruce Grobbelaar
DF	(England) Gary Ablett
DF	(England) David Burrows
DF	(Scotland) Steve Nicol
MF	(Republic of Ireland) Ronnie Whelan
DF	(Scotland) Gary Gillespie
FW	(England) Peter Beardsley
MF	(England) Barry Venison
FW	(Republic of Ireland) Ray Houghton
MF	(England) John Barnes
MF	(England) Steve McMahon
Substitutes:
MF	(England) Mike Marsh
FW	(Republic of Ireland) John Aldridge
DF	(Republic of Ireland) Steve Staunton
FW	(Scotland) Kenny Dalglish
DF	(England) Alex Watson
Player/Manager:
(Scotland) Kenny Dalglish
