= 1989–90 Celtic F.C. season =

Celtic
1989–90 season
- Chairman: Jack McGinn
- Manager: Billy McNeill
- Stadium: Celtic Park
- Scottish Premier Division: 5th
- Scottish Cup: Runners-up
- Scottish League Cup: Semi-finals
- European Cup Winners' Cup: First round
- Top goalscorer: League: Dariusz Dziekanowski – 8 All: Dariusz Dziekanowski – 16
- Highest home attendance: 52,281
- Lowest home attendance: 13,115
- Average home league attendance: 28,621
Home colours

During the 1989–90 Scottish football season, Celtic competed in the Scottish Premier Division.

== Competitions ==
=== Scottish Premier Division ===
==== League table ====
Pos	Team	Pld	W	D	L	GF	GA	GD	Pts	Qualification or relegation
3	Heart of Midlothian	36	16	12	8	54	35	+19	44	Qualification for the UEFA Cup first round
4	Dundee United	36	11	13	12	36	39	−3	35	Qualification for the UEFA Cup first round
5	Celtic	36	10	14	12	37	37	0	34	
6	Motherwell	36	11	12	13	43	47	−4	34	
7	Hibernian	36	12	10	14	34	41	−7	34	

Source: RSSSF
Rules for classification: 1) points; 2) goal difference; 3) number of goals scored.

==== Matches ====
12 August 1989 Premier League	Hearts	1–3	Celtic	Edinburgh
15:00				Stadium: Tynecastle Park; Attendance: 25,932

19 August 1989 Premier League	Celtic	1–0	Dunfermline Athletic	Glasgow
15:00				Stadium: Celtic Park; Attendance: 34,000

26 August 1989 Premier League	Celtic	1–1	Rangers	Glasgow
15:00				Stadium: Celtic Park; Attendance: 54,000

9 September 1989 Premier League	St Mirren	1–0	Celtic	Paisley
15:00				Stadium: St Mirren Park, Love Street; Attendance: 19,813

16 September 1989 Premier League	Dundee United	2–2	Celtic	Dundee
15:00 GMT				Stadium: Tannadice Park; Attendance: 16,624

23 September 1989 Premier League	Celtic	1–1	Motherwell	Glasgow
15:00 GMT				Stadium: Celtic Park; Attendance: 29,000

30 September 1989 Premier League	Aberdeen	1–1	Celtic	Aberdeen
15:00 GMT				Stadium: Pittodire Stadium; Attendance: 21,374

4 October 1989 Premier League	Celtic	3–1	Hibernian	Glasgow
19:30 GMT				Stadium: Celtic Park; Attendance: 36,000

14 October 1989 Premier League	Dundee	1–3	Celtic	Dundee
15:00 GMT				Stadium: Dens Park; Attendance: 16,215

21 October 1989 Premier League	Celtic	2–1	Heart of Midlothian	Glasgow
15:00 GMT				Stadium: Celtic Park; Attendance: 38,105

28 October 1989 Premier League	Dunfermline Athletic	2–0	Celtic	Dunfermline
15:00 GMT				Stadium: East End Park; Attendance: 19,588

4 November 1989 Premier League	Rangers	1–0	Celtic	Glasgow
15:00 GMT				Stadium: Ibrox Stadium; Attendance: 41,598

18 November 1989 Premier League	Celtic	0–1	Dundee United	Glasgow
15:00 GMT				Stadium: Celtic Park; Attendance: 32,250

22 November 1989 Premier League	Celtic	1–1	St Mirren	Glasgow
19:30 GMT				Stadium: Celtic Park; Attendance: 23,100

25 November 1989 Premier League	Motherwell	0–0	Celtic	Motherwell
15:00 GMT				Stadium: Fir Park; Attendance: 16,029

2 December 1989 Premier League	Celtic	1–0	Aberdeen	Glasgow
15:00 GMT				Stadium: Celtic Park; Attendance: 38,300

9 December 1989 Premier League	Hibernian	0–3	Celtic	Edinburgh
15:00 GMT				Stadium: Easter Road; Attendance: 18,000

16 December 1989 Premier League	Celtic	4–1	Dundee	Glasgow
15:00 GMT				Stadium: Celtic Park; Attendance: 17,860

26 December 1989 Premier League	Heart of Midlothian	0–0	Celtic	Edinburgh
15:00 GMT				Stadium: Tynecastle Park; Attendance: 23,259

30 December 1989 Premier League	Celtic	0–2	Dunfermline Athletic	Glasgow
15:00 GMT				Stadium: Celtic Park; Attendance: 30,548

2 January 1990 Premier League	Celtic	0–1	Rangers	Glasgow
15:00 GMT				Stadium: Celtic Park; Attendance: 54,526

6 January 1990 Premier League	St Mirren	0–2	Celtic	Paisley
15:00 GMT				Stadium: St Mirren Park, Love Street; Attendance: 14,813

13 January 1990 Premier League	Dundee United	2–0	Celtic	Dundee
15:00 GMT				Stadium: Tannadice Park; Attendance: 16,635

27 January 1990 Premier League	Celtic	0–1	Motherwell	Glasgow
15:00 GMT				Stadium: Celtic Park; Attendance: 23,000

3 February 1990 Premier League	Dundee	0–0	Celtic	Dundee
15:00 GMT				Stadium: Dens Park; Attendance: 14,100

10 February 1990 Premier League	Celtic	1–1	Hibernian	Glasgow
15:00 GMT				Stadium: Celtic Park; Attendance: 25,000

17 February 1990 Premier League	Aberdeen	1–1	Celtic	Aberdeen
15:00 GMT				Stadium: Pittodrie Stadium; Attendance: 22,100

3 March 1990 Premier League	Celtic	3–0	Dundee United	Glasgow
15:00 GMT				Stadium: Celtic Park; Attendance: 23,541

10 March 1990 Premier League	Celtic	1–1	Heart of Midlothian	Glasgow
15:00 GMT				Stadium: Celtic Park; Attendance: 34,792

24 March 1990 Premier League	Dunfermline Athletic	0–0	Celtic	Dunfermline
15:00 GMT				Stadium: East End Park; Attendance: 14,044

1 April 1990 Premier League	Rangers	3–0	Celtic	Glasgow
15:00 GMT				Stadium: Ibrox Stadium; Attendance: 41,926

7 April 1990 Premier League	Celtic	0–3	St Mirren	Glasgow
15:00 GMT				Stadium: Celtic Park; Attendance: 18,481

17 April 1990 Premier League	Hibernian	1–0	Celtic	Edinburgh
19:30 GMT				Stadium: Easter Road; Attendance: 11,000

21 April 1990 Premier League	Celtic	1–1	Dundee	Glasgow
15:00 GMT				Stadium: Celtic Park; Attendance: 15,115

28 April 1990 Premier League	Motherwell	1–1	Celtic	Motherwell
15:00 GMT				Stadium: Fir Park; Attendance: 10,322

2 May 1990 Premier League	Celtic	1–3	Aberdeen	Glasgow
19:30 GMT				Stadium: Celtic Park; Attendance: 20,154

=== Scottish Cup ===
20 January 1990 Third round	Forfar Athletic	1–2	Celtic	Forfar
15:00 GMT				Stadium: Station Park; Attendance: 8,388

25 February 1990 Fourth round	Celtic	1–0	Rangers	Glasgow
15:00 GMT				Stadium: Celtic Park; Attendance: 52,565

17 March 1990 Fifth round	Dunfermline Athletic	0–0	Celtic	Dunfermline
15:00 GMT				Stadium: East End Park; Attendance: 19,568

21 March 1990 Fifth round replay	Celtic	3–0	Dunfermline Athletic	Glasgow
15:00 GMT				Stadium: Celtic Park; Attendance: 40,768

14 April 1990 Semi-final	Celtic	2–0	Clydebank	Glasgow
15:00 GMT				Stadium: Hampden Park; Attendance: 34,803

12 May 1990 Final	Celtic	0–0 (a.e.t.) (8–9 p)	Aberdeen	Glasgow
15:00 GMT				Stadium: Hampden Park; Attendance: 58,735

=== Scottish League Cup ===
15 August 1989 Second round	Dumbarton	0–3	Celtic	Dumbarton
19:30 GMT				Stadium: Boghead Park; Attendance: 8,352

22 August 1989 Third round	Celtic	2–0	Queen of the South	Glasgow
19:30 GMT				Stadium: Celtic Park; Attendance: 20,074

30 August 1989 Quarter Finals	Heart of Midlothian	2–2	Celtic	Edinburgh
19:30 GMT				Stadium: Tynecastle Park; Attendance: 25,221

20 September 1989 Semi-finals	Celtic	0–1	Aberdeen	Glasgow
19:30 GMT				Stadium: Hampden Park; Attendance: 43,401

=== European Cup Winners' Cup ===
12 September 1989 1st round 1st leg	Partizan Belgrade (Socialist Federal Republic of Yugoslavia)	2–1	(Scotland) Celtic	Belgrade, Yugoslavia
20:00 GMT				Stadium: Partizan Stadium; Attendance: 8,500

27 September 1989 1st round 2nd leg	Celtic (Scotland)	5–4 (6–6 agg.)	(Socialist Federal Republic of Yugoslavia) Partizan Belgrade	Glasgow
20:00 GMT				Stadium: Celtic Park; Attendance: 45,298

== Club Staff ==
Board of Directors
Position	Name
Chairman	Jack McGinn
Vice-chairman	Kevin Kelly
Secretary	Chris White
Directors	James Farrell Tom Grant Chris White

Football Staff
Position	Name
Manager	Billy McNeill
Assistant Manager	Tommy Craig
Reserve Team Manager	Bobby Lennox
Youth Development Officer	Benny Rooney
Physio	Brian Scott
Masseur	Jimmy Steele
Kitman	Neil Mochan

== Transfers ==
Transfers In
Date	Name	From	Transfer Fee
May 1989	(Scotland) Paul McLaughlin	(Scotland) Queen's Park	Free
June 1989	(Scotland) Mike Galloway	(Scotland) Heart of Midlothian	£500,000
July 1989	(England) Paul Elliott	(Italy) Pisa SC	£650,000
July 1989	(Poland) Dariusz Dziekanowski	(Poland) Legia Warsaw	£500,000
August 1989	(Scotland) John Hewitt	(Scotland) Aberdeen	£250,000
November 1989	(Poland) Dariusz Wdowczyk	(Poland) Legia Warsaw	£400,000
		Total Transfer Fees	£2,300,000

Transfers Out
Date	Name	To	Transfer Fee
May 1989	(Republic of Ireland) Mick McCarthy	(France) Olympique Lyonnais	£350,000
June 1989	(Scotland) Owen Archdeacon	(England) Barnsley	£80,000
June 1989	(Scotland) Tony Shepherd	(England) Carlisle United	Free
July 1989	(Scotland) Mark McGhee	(England) Newcastle United	£250,000
July 1989	(Scotland) Charlie Christie	(Scotland) Caledonian	Free
August 1989	(Scotland) John Traynor	(Scotland) Clydebank	Free
December 1989	(Scotland) Tommy Burns	(Scotland) Kilmarnock	£50,000
January 1990	(Scotland) Roy Aitken	(England) Newcastle United	£500,000
February 1990	(England) Ian Andrews	(England) Southampton	£200,000
		Total Transfer Fees	£1,430,000
