= 1991–92 Celtic F.C. season =

Celtic
1991–92 season
- Chairman: Jack McGinn
- Manager: Liam Brady
- Stadium: Celtic Park
- Scottish Premier Division: 3rd
- Scottish Cup: Semi-finalists
- Scottish League Cup: Quarter-finalists
- UEFA Cup: 2nd round
- Top goalscorer: League: Charlie Nicholas – 21; All: Charlie Nicholas – 25
- Highest home attendance: 50,798
- Lowest home attendance: 12,699
- Average home league attendance: 25,086
Home colours

During the 1991–92 Scottish football season, Celtic competed in the Scottish Premier Division.

== Competitions ==
=== Scottish Premier Division ===
==== League table ====
| Pos | Team | Pld | W | D | L | GF | GA | GD | Pts | Qualification or relegation |
|---|---|---|---|---|---|---|---|---|---|---|
| 1 | Rangers (C) | 44 | 33 | 6 | 5 | 101 | 31 | +70 | 72 | Qualification for the Champions League first round |
| 2 | Heart of Midlothian | 44 | 27 | 9 | 8 | 60 | 37 | +23 | 63 | Qualification for the UEFA Cup first round |
| 3 | Celtic | 44 | 26 | 10 | 8 | 88 | 42 | +46 | 62 | Qualification for the UEFA Cup first round |
| 4 | Dundee United | 44 | 19 | 13 | 12 | 66 | 50 | +16 | 51 | |
| 5 | Hibernian | 44 | 16 | 17 | 11 | 53 | 45 | +8 | 49 | Qualification for the UEFA Cup first round |

Rules for classification: 1) points; 2) goal difference; 3) number of goals scored.
(C) Champions

==== Matches ====
| 10 August 1991 Premier League | Dundee United | 3–4 | Celtic | Dundee |
| 15:00 | | | | Stadium: Tannadice Park; Attendance: 16,731 |

| 13 August 1991 Premier League | Dunfermline Athletic | 1–3 | Celtic | Dunfermline |
| 19:30 | | | | Stadium: East End Park; Attendance: 13,794 |

| 17 August 1991 Premier League | Celtic | 4–1 | Falkirk | Glasgow |
| 15:00 | | | | Stadium: Celtic Park; Attendance: 32,469 |

| 24 August 1991 Premier League | Aberdeen | 1–0 | Celtic | Aberdeen |
| 15:00 | | | | Stadium: Pittodrie Stadium; Attendance: 20,503 |

| 31 August 1991 Premier League | Celtic | 0–2 | Rangers | Glasgow |
| 15:00 GMT | | | | Stadium: Celtic Park; Attendance: 50,756 |

| 7 September 1991 Premier League | Celtic | 0–0 | St Mirren | Glasgow |
| 15:00 GMT | | | | Stadium: Celtic Park; Attendance: 21,323 |

| 14 September 1991 Premier League | St Johnstone | 1–0 | Celtic | Perth |
| 15:00 GMT | | | | Stadium: McDiarmid Park; Attendance: 9,993 |

| 21 September 1991 Premier League | Celtic | 3 – 1 | Airdrieonians | Glasgow |
| 15:00 GMT | | | | Stadium: Celtic Park; Attendance: 17,552 |

| 28 September 1991 Premier League | Hibernian | 1–1 | Celtic | Edinburgh |
| 15:00 GMT | | | | Stadium: Easter Road; Attendance: 18,201 |

| 5 October 1991 Premier League | Celtic | 3–1 | Heart of Midlothian | Glasgow |
| 15:00 GMT | | | | Stadium: Celtic Park; Attendance: 33,621 |

| 8 October 1991 Premier League | Motherwell | 0–2 | Celtic | Motherwell |
| 19:30 GMT | | | | Stadium: Fir Park; Attendance: 13,283 |

| 12 October 1991 Premier League | Celtic | 4–1 | Dundee United | Glasgow |
| 19:30 GMT | | | | Stadium: Celtic Park; Attendance: 28,281 |

| 19 October 1991 Premier League | Falkirk | 4–3 | Celtic | Falkirk |
| 15:00 GMT | | | | Stadium: Brockville Park; Attendance: 11,108 |

| 26 October 1991 Premier League | St Mirren | 0–5 | Celtic | Paisley |
| 15:00 GMT | | | | Stadium: St Mirren Park, Love Street; Attendance: 10,473 |

| 30 October 1991 Premier League | Celtic | 4–0 | St Johnstone | Glasgow |
| 19:30 GMT | | | | Stadium: Celtic Park; Attendance: 18,554 |

| 2 November 1991 Premier League | Rangers | 1–1 | Celtic | Glasgow |
| 15:00 GMT | | | | Stadium: Ibrox Stadium; Attendance: 37,387 |

| 9 November 1991 Premier League | Celtic | 2–1 | Aberdeen | Glasgow |
| 15:00 GMT | | | | Stadium: Celtic Park; Attendance: 36,837 |

| 16 November 1991 Premier League | Heart of Midlothian | 3–1 | Celtic | Edinburgh |
| 15:00 GMT | | | | Stadium: Tynecastle Park; Attendance: 22,666 |

| 20 November 1991 Premier League | Celtic | 2–2 | Motherwell | Glasgow |
| 15:00 GMT | | | | Stadium: Celtic Park; Attendance: 16,350 |

| 23 November 1991 Premier League | Airdireonians | 0–3 | Celtic | Airdrie |
| 15:00 GMT | | | | Stadium: Broomfield Park; Attendance: 10,102 |

| 30 November 1991 Premier League | Celtic | 1–0 | Dunfermline Athletic | Glasgow |
| 15:00 GMT | | | | Stadium: Celtic Park; Attendance: 20,744 |

| 4 December 1991 Premier League | Celtic | 0–0 | Hibernian | Glasgow |
| 19:30 GMT | | | | Stadium: Celtic Park; Attendance: 22,340 |

| 7 December 1991 Premier League | Dundee United | 1–1 | Celtic | Dundee |
| 15:00 GMT | | | | Stadium: Tannadice Park; Attendance: 11,585 |

| 14 December 1991 Premier League | Celtic | 4–0 | St Mirren | Glasgow |
| 15:00 GMT | | | | Stadium: Celtic Park; Attendance: 16,825 |

| 28 December 1991 Premier League | Aberdeen | 2–2 | Celtic | Aberdeen |
| 15:00 GMT | | | | Stadium: Pittodrie Stadium; Attendance: 20,422 |

| 1 January 1992 Premier League | Celtic | 1–3 | Rangers | Glasgow |
| 15:00 GMT | | | | Stadium: Celtic Park; Attendance: 50,789 |

| 4 January 1992 Premier League | Celtic | 1–2 | Heart of Midlothian | Glasgow |
| 15:00 GMT | | | | Stadium: Celtic Park; Attendance: 30,417 |

| 8 January 1992 Premier League | St Johnstone | 2–4 | Celtic | Perth |
| 19:30 GMT | | | | Stadium: McDiarmid Park; Attendance: 9,283 |

| 11 January 1992 Premier League | Motherwell | 0–0 | Celtic | Motherwell |
| 15:00 GMT | | | | Stadium: Fir Park; Attendance: 12,115 |

| 18 January 1992 Premier League | Dunfermline Athletic | 0–1 | Celtic | Dunfermline |
| 15:00 GMT | | | | Stadium: East End Park; Attendance: 9,863 |

| 1 February 1992 Premier League | Celtic | 2–0 | Falkirk | Glasgow |
| 15:00 GMT | | | | Stadium: Celtic Park; Attendance: 16,927 |

| 8 February 1992 Premier League | Celtic | 2–0 | Airdrieonians | Glasgow |
| 15:00 GMT | | | | Stadium: Celtic Park; Attendance: 18,845 |

| 22 February 1992 Premier League | Hibernian | 0–2 | Celtic | Edinburgh |
| 15:00 GMT | | | | Stadium: Easter Road; Attendance: 16,756 |

| 29 February 1992 Premier League | Heart of Midlothian | 1–2 | Celtic | Edinburgh |
| 15:00 GMT | | | | Stadium: Tynecastle Park; Attendance: 20,863 |

| 14 March 1992 Premier League | Celtic | 1–0 | Aberdeen | Glasgow |
| 15:00 GMT | | | | Stadium: Celtic Park; Attendance: 29,380 |

| 17 March 1992 Premier League | Celtic | 4–1 | Motherwell | Glasgow |
| 19:30 GMT | | | | Stadium: Celtic Park; Attendance: 15,582 |

| 21 March 1992 Premier League | Rangers | 0–2 | Celtic | Glasgow |
| 15:00 GMT | | | | Stadium: Ibrox Stadium; Attendance: 42,160 |

| 28 March 1992 Premier League | Celtic | 3–1 | Dundee United | Glasgow |
| 15:00 GMT | | | | Stadium: Celtic Park; Attendance: 22,522 |

| 4 April 1992 Premier League | Falkirk | 0–3 | Celtic | Falkirk |
| 15:00 GMT | | | | Stadium: Brockville Park; Attendance: 8,842 |

| 8 April 1992 Premier League | St Mirren | 1–1 | Celtic | Paisley |
| 19:30 GMT | | | | Stadium: St Mirren Park, Love Street; Attendance: 7,316 |

| 11 April 1992 Premier League | Celtic | 3–2 | St Johnstone | Glasgow |
| 15:00 GMT | | | | Stadium: Celtic Park; Attendance: 13,327 |

| 18 April 1992 Premier League | Airdrieonians | 0–0 | Celtic | Airdrie |
| 15:00 GMT | | | | Stadium: Broomfield Park; Attendance: 8,296 |

| 25 April 1992 Premier League | Celtic | 2–0 | Dunfermline Athletic | Glasgow |
| 15:00 GMT | | | | Stadium: Celtic Park; Attendance: 12,699 |

| 2 May 1992 Premier League | Celtic | 1–2 | Hibernian | Glasgow |
| 15:00 GMT | | | | Stadium: Celtic Park; Attendance: 25,532 |

=== Scottish Cup ===
| 25 January 1992 Third round | Celtic | 6–0 | Montrose | Glasgow |
| 15:00 GMT | | | | Stadium: Celtic Park; Attendance: 18,579 |

| 11 February 1992 Fourth round | Celtic | 2–1 | Dundee United | Glasgow |
| 19:30 GMT | | | | Stadium: Celtic Park; Attendance: 26,225 |

| 7 March 1992 Fifth round | Celtic | 3–0 | Morton | Glasgow |
| 15:00 GMT | | | | Stadium: Celtic Park; Attendance: 28,016 |

| 31 March 1992 Semi-final | Rangers | 1–0 | Celtic | Glasgow |
| 20:00 GMT | McCoist | | | Stadium: Hampden Park; Attendance: 45,191 |

=== Scottish League Cup ===
| 21 August 1991 Second round | Morton | 2–4 | Celtic | Greenock |
| 19:30 GMT | | | | Stadium: Cappielow Park; Attendance: 9,518 |

| 27 August 1991 Third round | Celtic | 3–1 | Raith Rovers | Glasgow |
| 19:30 GMT | | | | Stadium: Celtic Park; Attendance: 21,080 |

| 3 September 1991 Quarter Finals | Airdrieonians | 0–0 | Celtic | Airdrie |
| 20:00 GMT | | | | Stadium: Broomfield Park; Attendance: 10,197 |

=== UEFA Cup ===
| 18 September 1991 1st round 1st leg | Celtic (Scotland) | 2–0 | (Belgium) Germinal Ekeren | Glasgow |
| 20:00 GMT | Nicholas 15' (pen.), 39' | | | Stadium: Celtic Park; Attendance: 27,410 |

| 1 October 1991 1st round 2nd leg | Germinal Ekeren (Belgium) | 1–1 (1–3 agg.) | (Scotland) Celtic | Antwerp |
| 20:00 GMT | Schmöller 41' | | Galloway 10' | Stadium: Olympisch Stadion; Attendance: 6,979 |

| 22 October 1991 2nd round 1st leg | Neuchatel Xamax (Switzerland) | 5–1 | (Scotland) Celtic | Neuchâtel |
| 20:00 GMT | H. Hassan 10', 20', 56', 74'; Bonvin 38' | | O'Neil 60' | Stadium: Stade de la Maladière; Attendance: 11,300 |

| 6 November 1991 2nd round 2nd leg | Celtic (Scotland) | 1–0 (2–5 agg.) | (Switzerland) Neuchatel Xamax | Glasgow |
| 20:00 GMT | Miller 52' | | | Stadium: Celtic Park; Attendance: 27,454 |

== Club staff ==
Board of Directors / Senior Management
| Position | Name |
|---|---|
| Chairman | Jack McGinn |
| Vice-Chairman | Kevin Kelly |
| Secretary | Chris White |
| Directors | James Farrell Tom Grant Michael Kelly David Smith (Feb 1992) Chris White |
| Chief executive | Terry Cassidy |

Football Staff
| Name | Position |
|---|---|
| Manager | Liam Brady |
| Assistant manager | Tommy Craig |
| Coach | Mick Martin |
| Reserve Team Manager | Bobby Lennox |
| Youth Coordinator | Benny Rooney |
| Physio | Brian Scott |
| Masseur | Jimmy Steele |
| Kitman | Neil Mochan |

== Transfers ==
Transfers In
| Date | Name | From | Transfer Fee |
|---|---|---|---|
| July 1991 | (Republic of Ireland) Tony Cascarino | (England) Aston Villa | £1,100,000 |
| August 1991 | (Scotland) Gordon Marshall | (Scotland) Falkirk | £270,000 |
| August 1991 | (Scotland) Gary Gillespie | (England) Liverpool | £925,000 |
| November 1991 | (England) Tony Mowbray | (England) Middlesbrough | £1,000,000 |
| February 1992 | (Scotland) Tom Boyd | (England) Chelsea | Swap Deal |
| | | Total Transfer Fees | £3,295,000 |

Transfers Out
| Date | Name | To | Transfer Fee |
|---|---|---|---|
| June 1991 | (Scotland) Lex Baillie | (Scotland) St. Mirren | £90,000 |
| July 1991 | (England) Paul Elliott | (England) Chelsea | £1,400,000 |
| August 1991 | (Scotland) Alex Mathie | (Scotland) Greenock Morton | £100,000 |
| October 1991 | (Northern Ireland) Anton Rogan | (England) Sunderland | £350,000 |
| January 1992 | (Poland) Dariusz Dziekanowski | (England) Bristol City | £250,000 |
| January 1992 | (Scotland) John Hewitt | (Scotland) St. Mirren | Free |
| February 1992 | (Scotland) Andy Walker | (England) Bolton Wanderers | £160,000 |
| February 1992 | (Republic of Ireland) Tony Cascarino | (England) Chelsea | Swap Deal |
| | | Total Transfer Fees | £2,350,000 |
