= St Patrick's Sports Academy =

St Patrick's Sports Academy is a youth football and sports club based in Motherwell, near Glasgow in Scotland. It operates football teams in age groups from under-9 to under-19.

Formerly Celtic Boys Club, it helped more than 50 players towards professional careers, some at Celtic F.C. It was renamed in August 2018 at a time when four former affiliated individuals were awaiting trial for historic sexual abuse offences committed from the 1960s to the 1990s.

== History ==
St Patrick's Sports Academy
Home colours

The Celtic Boys Club was founded in 1966. First based in Maryhill, the club was initially independent from the professional Celtic Football Club, but links started to strengthen as the Boys Club was allowed to use the training facilities at Barrowfield training complex on London Road. John Higgins, a Celtic scout, recognised the benefits of the club and a semi-formal agreement was made where the Under-16 side would act as a nursery for Celtic scouts to find players with potential to play for Celtic FC, although players from the Boys club were under no obligation to sign for Celtic FC.

The various Boys Club teams have won numerous honours over the years. Their most notable win was at under-16 level in the 1974 European Youth Cup, defeating Manchester United 1–0 in the final, courtesy of a goal by George McCluskey.

The club was rebranded in August 2018 as St Patrick's Sports Academy, with a new club logo and different style of green and white strip.

St Patrick's Sports Academy operates football teams in age groups from under-9 to under-19, with home matches played at Bothwellhaugh in Strathclyde Country Park, Motherwell. The club also promotes women's football, walking, running and cycling.

=== Professional players developed ===
Celtic Boys Club helped develop many future professional players, some of whom have gone on to play for Celtic FC.

- Roy Aitken
- Marc Anthony
- Tom Boyd
- Jimmy Boyle
- Alan Brazil
- Gerry Britton
- Mark Burchill
- Tommy Burns
- Gary Caldwell
- Jim Casey
- Barry John Corr
- Ronnie Coyle
- Stephen Crainey
- Danny Crainie
- Gerry Creaney
- Simon Donnelly
- Barry Elliot
- David Elliot
- Mark Fotheringham
- Steve Fulton
- Tony Gallagher
- Peter Grant
- Paddy Kelly
- John Kennedy
- Stewart Kerr
- John Paul McBride
- Ryan McCann
- Dugald McCarrison
- George McCluskey
- Brian McColligan
- Andy McCondichie
- Doug McGuire
- Jim McInally
- Tosh McKinlay
- Stephen McManus
- Mark McNally
- Paul McStay
- Willie McStay
- Alex Mathie
- Joe Miller
- David Moyes
- Charlie Nicholas
- Brian O'Neil
- Mark Reid
- Andy Ritchie
- Tony Shepherd
- Jamie Smith
- John Traynor
- Derek Whyte

=== Historic sexual abuse ===
==== Jim Torbett ====
In 1996, former Celtic Boys Club player Alan Brazil stated that when he was 13 years old he had been sexually abused by the club manager, Jim Torbett. The allegations were heard at the Glasgow Sheriff Court in 1998, where Torbett was found guilty of shameless and indecent conduct with three juvenile players between October 1967 and March 1974. Torbett was given a prison sentence of 30 months. There have since been further allegations about Torbett; in May 2017 he appeared at Glasgow Sheriff Court having been charged with six offences; in April 2018, Torbett appeared at the High Court in Glasgow where he faced 12 historical sexual abuse charges dating from January 1970 to August 1994; a June 2018 trial date was set. On 5 November 2018, Torbett was found guilty of five counts of sexually abusing children and sentenced to six years in prison. In April 2023 at the High Court in Inverness, Torbett was found guilty of four charges of sexually abusing a 13-year-old player in 1967. Previously potentially eligible for early release in May 2024, he was jailed for a further three years.

==== Gerald King ====
Also in April 2017, Gerald King, a former chairman of Celtic Boys Club, was charged by police with non-recent sexual offences. King, 66, went on trial on 26 November 2018 at Glasgow Sheriff Court where he was accused of lewd and libidinous practices towards five boys and two girls while he was a Glasgow teacher, between August 1983 and June 1989; he was also charged with taking or permitting to be taken indecent images of children between January 1987 and December 1988 at Barrowfield. On 5 December 2018, King was convicted of five charges of using lewd and libidinous practises towards five victims between August 1984 and April 1989, and found guilty of taking indecent pictures of children in February 1987. On 7 January 2019, King was given a three-year probation order, ordered to do community service and put on the sex offenders register for five years.

==== Frank Cairney ====
In April 2017, Frank Cairney, a former Celtic Boys Club coach and manager (who, in November 1998, had been acquitted of charges of shameless indecency towards young football players due to lack of evidence), was charged in connection with six alleged historical sexual offences. He appeared at Hamilton Sheriff Court on 11 May 2018, facing ten charges of alleged abuse between 1965 and 1986, including indecent assault, gross indecency and lewd, indecent and libidinous practices and behaviour. After Cairney's defence team requested a delay to investigate witness statements, the trial at Hamilton began in early December 2018 with Cairney, 82, denying all ten charges. On 14 December, Cairney was found guilty of nine charges of sexually abusing young footballers, placed on the sex offenders register and was granted bail before being sentenced. On 7 February 2019, Cairney was jailed for four years. In July 2019, the Times reported that in 2008 the CBC website had paid tribute to Cairney: "A report on the CBC website, which was deleted after the club was renamed St Patrick's Sports Academy last year, noted: 'The future success of the boys' club was probably secured when Frank Cairney was appointed general manager in 1970.'" Also in July 2019, Cairney was reported to be of interest to police in Kearny, New Jersey over allegations of sexual assault of a 16-year-old player during a 1991 Celtic Boys Club tour to the US. Further allegations against Cairney emerged after other victims contacted police in 2018 and 2019, and, in January 2023, he was due to stand trial on three indecent assaults at Glasgow Sheriff Court. However, while a judge accepted the allegations, Cairney, 87, was found to be unfit to stand trial, suffering from health problems including dementia.

==== Jim McCafferty ====
In a trial in May 2019 at Edinburgh High Court, Jim McCafferty was jailed for six years and nine months after pleading guilty to 11 charges of abusing teenagers between 1972 and 1996. The victims abused by McCafferty were at Celtic Boys Club, Celtic's youth team, and youth teams he ran in North Lanarkshire.

==== Civil proceedings ====
In October 2020, the Guardian reported that 21 sexual abuse survivors were bringing a civil case against Celtic in 2021; in October 2021, 25 men claiming to be victims of historical sexual abuse at Celtic Boys Club launched group proceedings against Celtic Football Club. In March 2022, a judge gave the go-ahead for 22 former Celtic Boys Club players and abuse survivors to launch a US-style "class action" group claim against Celtic FC after agreeing the two clubs were "intimately connected". A hearing was expected to start in December 2022, but was postponed to allow lawyers more time to study new documents. Ahead of a scheduled June 2023 hearing, Celtic lawyers reportedly tried to get the action discontinued arguing that too much time has passed to allow a fair trial. Ahead of a court hearing scheduled for October, in September 2023 Celtic FC began negotiations to settle legal claims of historical abuse brought by more than 20 former players. In April 2025, Thompsons Solicitors said about 70% of cases relating to former Celtic Boys Club players had been settled by Celtic plc, resulting in a seven-figure payout. Further settlements were expected.

Following publication of a Scottish Football Association's report in February 2021, Celtic issued a fresh apology over historic sexual abuse at their feeder team.
