= 1992–93 Celtic F.C. season =

Celtic
1992–93 season
- Chairman: Kevin Kelly
- Manager: Liam Brady
- Stadium: Celtic Park
- Scottish Premier Division: 3rd
- Scottish Cup: 4th Round
- Scottish League Cup: Semi-finalists
- UEFA Cup: 2nd round
- Top goalscorer: League: Andy Payton – 13; All: Andy Payton – 15
- Highest home attendance: 52,770
- Lowest home attendance: 10,151
- Average home league attendance: 22,683
Home colours

During the 1992–93 Scottish football season, Celtic competed in the Scottish Premier Division.

== Competitions ==
=== Scottish Premier Division ===
==== League table ====
Pos	Team	Pld	W	D	L	GF	GA	GD	Pts	Qualification or relegation
1	Rangers (C)	44	33	7	4	97	35	+62	73	Qualification for the Champions League first round
2	Aberdeen	44	27	10	7	87	36	+51	64	Qualification for the Cup Winners' Cup first round
3	Celtic	44	24	12	8	68	41	+27	60	Qualification for the UEFA Cup first round
4	Dundee United	44	19	9	16	56	49	+7	47	Qualification for the UEFA Cup first round
5	Heart of Midlothian	44	15	14	15	46	51	−5	44	Qualification for the UEFA Cup first round

Source: RSSSF
Rules for classification: 1) points; 2) goal difference; 3) number of goals scored.
(C) Champions

==== Matches ====
1 August 1992 Premier League	Hearts	0–1	Celtic	Edinburgh
15:00				Stadium: Tynecastle Park; Attendance: 18,510

5 August 1992 Premier League	Aberdeen	1–1	Celtic	Glasgow
19:30				Stadium: Celtic Park; Attendance: 14,618

8 August 1992 Premier League	Celtic	1–1	Motherwell	Glasgow
15:00				Stadium: Celtic Park; Attendance: 24,935

15 August 1992 Premier League	Celtic	2–0	Dundee United	Glasgow
15:00				Stadium: Celtic Park; Attendance: 14,013

22 August 1992 Premier League	Rangers	1–1	Celtic	Glasgow
15:00 GMT				Stadium: Ibrox Stadium; Attendance: 43,329

29 August 1992 Premier League	Airdrieonians	1–1	Celtic	Airdrie
15:00 GMT				Stadium: Broomfield Park; Attendance: 12,222

2 September 1992 Premier League	Celtic	3–1	St Johnstone	Glasgow
19:30 GMT				Stadium: Celtic Park; Attendance: 21,831

12 September 1992 Premier League	Celtic	2–3	Hibernian	Glasgow
15:00 GMT				Stadium: Celtic Park; Attendance: 28,130

19 September 1992 Premier League	Falkirk	4–5	Celtic	Falkirk
15:00 GMT				Stadium: Brockville Park; Attendance: 9,678

26 September 1992 Premier League	Celtic	1–2	Partick Thistle	Glasgow
15:00 GMT				Stadium: Celtic Park; Attendance: 21,486

3 October 1992 Premier League	Dundee	0–1	Celtic	Dundee
15:00 GMT				Stadium: Dens Park; Attendance: 12,866

7 October 1992 Premier League	Celtic	1–1	Hearts	Glasgow
19:30 GMT				Stadium: Celtic Park; Attendance: 26,049

17 October 1992 Premier League	Motherwell	1–3	Celtic	Motherwell
15:00 GMT				Stadium: Fir Park; Attendance: 10,016

24 October 1992 Premier League	Celtic	2–0	Airdrieonians	Glasgow
15:00 GMT				Stadium: Celtic Park; Attendance: 19,549

31 October 1992 Premier League	St Johnstone	0–0	Celtic	Perth
15:00 GMT				Stadium: McDiarmid Park; Attendance: 9,783

7 November 1992 Premier League	Celtic	0–1	Rangers	Glasgow
15:00 GMT				Stadium: Celtic Park; Attendance: 51,950

11 November 1992 Premier League	Dundee United	1–1	Celtic	Dundee
19:30 GMT				Stadium: Tannadice Park; Attendance: 11,831

21 November 1992 Premier League	Celtic	3–2	Falkirk	Glasgow
15:00 GMT				Stadium: Celtic Park; Attendance: 15,978

28 November 1992 Premier League	Hibernian	1–2	Celtic	Edinburgh
15:00 GMT				Stadium: Easter Road; Attendance: 12,985

2 December 1992 Premier League	Celtic	2–2	Aberdeen	Glasgow
19:30 GMT				Stadium: Celtic Park; Attendance: 29,122

5 December 1992 Premier League	Partick Thistle	2–3	Celtic	Glasgow
15:00 GMT				Stadium: Firhill Park; Attendance: 13,312

12 December 1992 Premier League	Celtic	1–0	Dundee	Glasgow
15:00 GMT				Stadium: Celtic Park; Attendance: 16,797

19 December 1992 Premier League	Hearts	1–0	Celtic	Edinburgh
15:00 GMT				Stadium: Tynecastle Park; Attendance: 13,354

26 December 1992 Premier League	Celtic	0–1	Dundee United	Glasgow
15:00 GMT				Stadium: Celtic Park; Attendance: 22,852

2 January 1993 Premier League	Rangers	1–0	Celtic	Glasgow
15:00 GMT				Stadium: Ibrox Stadium; Attendance: 46,039

23 January 1993 Premier League	Airdrieonians	0–1	Celtic	Airdrie
19:45 GMT				Stadium: Broomfield Park; Attendance: 7,473

30 January 1993 Premier League	Celtic	1–1	Motherwell	Glasgow
15:00 GMT				Stadium: Celtic Park; Attendance: 18,513

3 February 1993 Premier League	Celtic	5–1	St Johnstone	Glasgow
19:30 GMT				Stadium: Celtic Park; Attendance: 12,931

13 February 1993 Premier League	Aberdeen	1–1	Celtic	Aberdeen
15:00 GMT				Stadium: Pittodrie Stadium; Attendance: 14,673

20 February 1993 Premier League	Celtic	0–0	Partick Thistle	Glasgow
15:00 GMT				Stadium: Celtic Park; Attendance: 15,561

23 February 1993 Premier League	Dundee	0–1	Celtic	Dundee
19:30 GMT				Stadium: Dens Park; Attendance: 7,221

27 February 1993 Premier League	Falkirk	0–3	Celtic	Falkirk
15:00 GMT				Stadium: Brockville Park; Attendance: 8,165

10 March 1993 Premier League	Celtic	1–0	Hearts	Glasgow
19:30 GMT				Stadium: Celtic Park; Attendance: 16,984

16 March 1993 Premier League	Celtic	2–1	Hibernian	Glasgow
19:30 GMT				Stadium: Celtic Park; Attendance: 12,178

20 March 1993 Premier League	Celtic	2–1	Rangers	Glasgow
15:00 GMT				Stadium: Celtic Park; Attendance: 52,770

27 March 1993 Premier League	Dundee United	2–3	Celtic	Dundee
15:00 GMT				Stadium: Tannadice Park; Attendance: 12,185

3 April 1993 Premier League	Motherwell	2–0	Celtic	Motherwell
15:00 GMT				Stadium: Fir Park; Attendance: 10,102

6 April 1993 Premier League	Celtic	4–0	Airdireonians	Glasgow
19:30 GMT				Stadium: Celtic Park; Attendance: 10,671

10 April 1993 Premier League	St Johnstone	1–1	Celtic	Perth
15:00 GMT				Stadium: McDiarmid Park; Attendance: 8,609

17 April 1993 Premier League	Hibernian	3–1	Celtic	Edinburgh
15:00 GMT				Stadium: Easter Road; Attendance: 11,132

20 April 1993 Premier League	Celtic	1–0	Falkirk	Glasgow
19:30 GMT				Stadium: Celtic Park; Attendance: 10,151

1 May 1993 Premier League	Celtic	1–0	Aberdeen	Glasgow
15:00 GMT				Stadium: Celtic Park; Attendance: 20,642

8 May 1993 Premier League	Partick Thistle	0–1	Celtic	Glasgow
15:00 GMT				Stadium: Firhill Park; Attendance: 16,417

15 May 1993 Premier League	Celtic	2–0	Dundee	Glasgow
15:00 GMT				Stadium: Celtic Park; Attendance: 19,436

=== Scottish Cup ===
9 January 1993 Third round	Clyde	0–0	Celtic	Hamilton
15:00 GMT				Stadium: Douglas Park; Attendance: 6,500

20 January 1993 Third round	Celtic	1–0	Clyde	Glasgow
19:30 GMT				Stadium: Celtic Park; Attendance: 16,599

6 February 1993 Fourth round	Falkirk	2–0	Celtic	Falkirk
15:00 GMT				Stadium: Brockville Park; Attendance: 13,012

=== Scottish League Cup ===
12 August 1992 Second round	Stirling Albion	0–3	Celtic	Glasgow
20:00 GMT				Stadium: Hampden Park; Attendance: 7,630

19 August 1992 Third round	Celtic	1–0	Dundee	Glasgow
20:00 GMT				Stadium: Celtic Park; Attendance: 30,849

26 August 1992 Quarter Finals	Hearts	1–2	Celtic	Edinburgh
20:00 GMT				Stadium: Tynecastle Park; Attendance: 21,502

23 September 1992 Semi-final	Aberdeen	1–0	Celtic	Glasgow
20:00 GMT				Stadium: Hampden Park; Attendance: 40,618

=== UEFA Cup ===
15 September 1992 1st round 1st leg	Cologne (Germany)	2–0	(Scotland) Celtic	Cologne
20:00 GMT				Stadium: Müngersdorfer Stadion; Attendance: 26,000

30 September 1992 1st round 2nd leg	Celtic (Scotland)	3–0 (3–2 agg.)	(Germany) Cologne	Glasgow
20:00 GMT	O'Neil 99'			Stadium: Celtic Park; Attendance: 30,747

20 October 1992 2nd round 1st leg	Borussia Dortmund (Germany)	1–0	(Scotland) Celtic	Dortmund
20:00 GMT	O'Neil 99'			Stadium: Westfalenstadion; Attendance: 35,803

3 November 1992 2nd round 2nd leg	Celtic (Scotland)	1–2 (1–3 agg.)	(Germany) Borussia Dortmund	Glasgow
20:00 GMT	O'Neil 99'			Stadium: Celtic Park; Attendance: 31,578

== Club staff ==
Board of Directors
Position	Name
Chairman	Kevin Kelly
Vice-Chairman	David Smith
Secretary	Chris White
Directors	James Farrell Tom Grant Michael Kelly Jack McGinn Chris White
Chief Executive	Terry Cassidy

Football Management
Position	Name
Manager	Liam Brady
Assistant Manager	Tommy Craig (until February 1993) Joe Jordan (From February 1993)
Coach	Frank Connor
Reserve Team Manager	Tom McAdam
Youth Development Manager	Tommy Craig
Physio	Brian Scott
Masseur	Jimmy Steele
Kitman	Neil Mochan

== Transfers ==
Transfers In
Date	Name	From	Transfer Fee
August 1992	(England) Andy Payton	(England) Middlesbrough	Swap Deal
August 1992	(England) Stuart Slater	(England) West Ham United	£1,500,000
August 1992	(Albania) Rudi Vata	(Albania) FK Dinamo Tirana	£200,000
December 1992	(Scotland) Frank McAvennie	(Hong Kong) South China	Free
		Total Transfer Fees	£1,700,000

Transfers Out
Date	Name	To	Transfer Fee
August 1992	(Republic of Ireland) Chris Morris	(England) Middlesbrough	Swap Deal
August 1992	(Scotland) Gerry Britton	(Scotland) Partick Thistle	£100,000
August 1992	(Scotland) Derek Whyte	(England) Middlesbrough	£900,000
October 1992	(Scotland) Steve McCahill	(Scotland) Greenock Morton	Free
January 1993	(England) Martin Hayes	(Wales) Swansea City	Free
February 1993	(Scotland) Dugald McCarrison	(Scotland) Kilmarnock	£100,000
March 1993	(Republic of Ireland) Tommy Coyne	(England) Tranmere Rovers	£350,000
		Total Transfer Fees	£1,450,000
