= Andy Murdoch (footballer, born 1968) =

Scottish footballer

Personal information
- Full name: Andrew Gerard Murdoch
- Date of birth: 20 July 1968 (age 58)
- Place of birth: Greenock, Scotland
- Height: 6 ft 1 in (1.85 m)
- Position: Goalkeeper

Youth career
- Johnstone Burgh
- 1987–1988: Celtic

Senior career*
Years	Team	Apps	(Gls)
1988–1991	Celtic	0	(0)
1989	→ Partick Thistle (loan)	13	(0)
1989	→ Partick Thistle (loan)	13	(0)
1989	→ Hamilton Academical (loan)	4	(0)
1991–1995	Partick Thistle	75	(0)
Total		105	(0)
- * Club domestic league appearances and goals

Andrew Gerard Murdoch (born 20 July 1968) is a Scottish former footballer, who played as a goalkeeper for Celtic, Partick Thistle and Hamilton Academical.

== Career ==
=== Celtic and loans ===
Born in Greenock and educated at St Columba's High School, Gourock, Murdoch began his career as a teenager in the Junior grade with Johnstone Burgh while training as a draughtsman with the Royal Ordnance. His form attracted the attention of Celtic who signed him in 1987. Unable to break through into the first team under Billy McNeill, with Pat Bonner the long-term incumbent, his initial involvement was limited to a well-attended testimonial match for Bryan Robson.

Murdoch had two separate loan spells with Partick Thistle (the second half of 1988–89 and returning for the first four months of 1989–90); he conceded a goal in the opening minute of his first senior game against Clydebank but recovered from this to impress the Jags' club hierarchy with his performances.

A brief loan at Hamilton Academical followed (managed by John Lambie who had also brought him to Partick); coincidentally Murdoch made his Accies debut against Partick. He returned to Celtic seemingly set to play with Bonner injured, but his chances were jeopardised when he himself suffered a torn knee ligament in the 1990 pre-season tour.

=== Partick Thistle ===
Having never appeared competitively for Celtic, Murdoch became Partick Thistle's record signing in February 1991, moving permanently for a fee of £85,000 in a combined transfer involving Paul McLaughlin – again it was Lambie who made the deal, with the latter having also returned to Firhill. The record may have been broken by the 2017 signing of Niall Keown, but the transfer fee was not disclosed publicly.

He would spend three full seasons contracted to Partick Thistle, battling with injuries as well as vying with Craig Nelson for the starting place. During the period the club won promotion to the Scottish Premier Division in 1992 (with Murdoch as the regular goalkeeper) and maintained their status in the top tier in the following seasons – they were eventually relegated via a play-off in 1997.

Having already conceded seven goals in a match against Clydebank in May 1991 (Ken Eadie scoring four to win the division's golden boot), Murdoch was in the side which lost 7–0 at home to Aberdeen in November 1992, in a rearranged fixture after the original match was abandoned due to heavy snowfall.

He did get to play at Celtic Park in September 1992, when Partick achieved a rare victory (2–1) in what was Murdoch's first appearance in the top flight having missed the opening weeks of the season with a broken finger, and was also Albert Craig's Thistle debut. He lined up there again just prior to the stadium's closure for redevelopment in a 1–1 draw in May 1994.

He was part of the Thistle squad which won the 1993 Tennent's Sixes indoor tournament.

=== 1993 'ghost goal' ===
Murdoch was involved in one of Scottish football's more bizarre moments when Paddy Connolly scored past him in a February 1993 match against Dundee United at Firhill, but referee Les Mottram failed to notice the ball had entered the goal and come back from the supporting stanchion after the close-range shot. Despite Partick defender Martin Clark catching the ball and handing it to Murdoch to restart, Mottram missed both the goal and handball to wave play on. Dundee United still won 4–0, and Mottram went on to officiate in the 1994 World Cup the following year. The incident resulted in the stanchions from which the ball had rebounded, previously widely used, being removed in a re-design of football goalposts.

In 2018, at the same end of the stadium, a similar incident occurred, with Partick Thistle this time being denied a legitimate goal.

=== Later years ===
At the beginning of the 1994–95 season, Murdoch moved out of the senior game aged 26 to join Strathclyde Police (as did former Celtic reserve contemporaries David Elliot and Lex Baillie); he spent time with local club Greenock Juniors before returning to Partick for a final short spell in 2000 at John Lambie's request due to a goalkeeping injury crisis. He found greater long-term success in his career in law enforcement than in professional football, rising to the rank of superintendent in the Police Scotland force.
