= Rab Stewart (footballer, born 1962) =

Scottish footballer

Personal information
- Full name: Robert George Stewart
- Date of birth: 3 January 1962
- Place of birth: Airdrie, Scotland
- Date of death: 20 August 2016 (aged 54)
- Place of death: Airdrie, Scotland
- Position: Forward

Youth career
- Whitburn Bluebells

Senior career*
| Years | Team | Apps | (Gls) |
| 1981–1984 | Dunfermline Athletic | 79 | (17) |
| 1984–1985 | Motherwell | 33 | (10) |
| 1985–1988 | Falkirk | 57 | (7) |
| 1988–1990 | Queen of the South | 16 | (0) |
| Total | | 185 | (34) |
- * Club domestic league appearances and goals

Robert George Stewart (3 January 1962 – 20 August 2016) was a Scottish footballer who played as a forward.

Stewart was born in Airdrie. He began his senior career with Dunfermline Athletic in 1981 where he was best known for his goal for the then Second Division outfit against Rangers at Ibrox in the third round of the 1983-84 Scottish Cup which gave the Pars a shock lead before two late Rangers goals ended hopes of a major upset.

Stewart also played for Motherwell, Falkirk and Queen of the South.

Stewart died on 20 August 2016 at the age of 54.
