= Dougie McGuire =

Scottish footballer and manager (born 1967)

Personal information
- Full name: Douglas John McGuire
- Date of birth: 6 September 1967 (age 59)
- Place of birth: Bathgate, Scotland
- Position: Right winger

Youth career
- 1982–1986: Celtic Boys Club

Senior career*
Years	Team	Apps	(Gls)
1986–1988	Celtic	2	(0)
1987	→ Dumbarton (loan)	3	(0)
1988	→ Sunderland (loan)	1	(0)
1988–1990	Coventry	4	(0)
1990–1991	Cumnock Juniors		
1991–1995	Queen of the South	86	(12)
1995–1996	Stranraer	21	(2)
1996–1997	Albion Rovers	16	(3)
Total		133	(17)

Managerial career
- 2008–2009: Ardeer Thistle
- * Club domestic league appearances and goals

Dougie McGuire (born 6 September 1967) is a Scottish former professional footballer who played as a right winger for Celtic, Queen of the South, Stranraer and Albion Rovers in Scotland and also Coventry in England.

== Career ==
McGuire's youth career was at Celtic Boys Club before he was signed by Celtic in 1986, where he stayed for two seasons and played in two league matches and also a Scottish League Cup match and a European game. McGuire's debut was on 22 November 1986, when he replaced Tony Shepherd in a home match at half-time versus Falkirk. The Bhoys were 2–1 down at the time and he created two goals to achieve victory. During his time at Celtic Park McGuire also had loan spells with Dumbarton (three league games) and Sunderland (one league game).

In August 1988, McGuire signed for Coventry City in a £40,000 deal and went on to play in four league matches in the 1989-90 season. During his time as Highfield Road, some of McGuire's teammates included Steve Ogrizovic, Kevin Gallacher, Kevin Drinkell, David Speedie and Cyrille Regis.

McGuire then played briefly for Cumnock Juniors before he was signed by Ally MacLeod for Queen of the South in Dumfries at the start of the 1991-92 season. McGuire spent four seasons at Palmerston Park and played in 86 league matches and scored 12 goals.

McGuire then moved to the Doonhamers neighbours Stranraer for the 1995-96 season, where he played in 21 league matches and scored two goals.

McGuire then signed for Albion Rovers for the 1996-97 season, where he played in 16 league matches and scored 3 goals that were all penalties in the same match versus Arbroath, which was a Scottish Football League record until Paul Hartley, then playing for Aberdeen, equalled the feat on the opening day of the 2010-11 season.

McGuire then enjoyed a long career in the rough-and-tumble of the Scottish Junior circuit in Ayrshire, encompassing two spells at Irvine Meadow and spells at Ardeer Thistle, Ardrossan Winton Rovers and Dalry Thistle.

McGuire later went on to be the manager of Ardeer Thistle for the 2008–09 season.
