= 1987–88 Scottish Cup =

Tournament details
- Country: Scotland

Final positions
- Champions: Celtic
- Runners-up: Dundee United

The 1987–88 Scottish Cup was the 103rd staging of Scotland's most prestigious football knockout competition. The Cup was won by Celtic who defeated Dundee United in the final.

== First round ==
Home team	Score	Away team
Inverness Caledonian	1 – 1	East Stirlingshire
Albion Rovers	1 – 1	St Johnstone
Montrose	0 – 2	Ayr United
Stirling Albion	1 – 2	Cowdenbeath
Threave Rovers	0 – 6	Stranraer
Vale of Leithen	2 – 3	Brechin City

=== Replays ===
Home team	Score	Away team
East Stirlingshire	2 – 1	Inverness Caledonian
St Johnstone	2 – 0	Albion Rovers

== Second round ==
Home team	Score	Away team
Alloa Athletic	0 – 1	Cowdenbeath
Berwick Rangers	0 – 1	Brechin City
Buckie Thistle	2 – 3	East Stirlingshire
Fraserburgh	2 – 5	St Johnstone
Gala Fairydean	3 – 0	Civil Service Strollers
Queen's Park	2 – 3	Ayr United
Stenhousemuir	1 – 1	Arbroath
Stranraer	6 – 2	Keith

=== Replay ===
Home team	Score	Away team
Arbroath	1 – 1	Stenhousemuir

==== Second Replay ====
Home team	Score	Away team
Stenhousemuir	0 – 1	Arbroath

== Third round ==
Home team	Score	Away team
Raith Rovers	0 – 0	Rangers
Forfar Athletic	1 – 1	Partick Thistle
Hamilton Academical	2 – 0	Meadowbank Thistle
Arbroath	0 – 7	Dundee United
Celtic	1 – 0	Stranraer
Clyde	0 – 0	Cowdenbeath
Dumbarton	0 – 0	Hibernian
Dundee	0 – 0	Brechin City
Dunfermline Athletic	1 – 1	Ayr United
East Fife	1 – 2	Airdrieonians
Falkirk	1 – 3	Hearts
Gala Fairydean	3 – 5	East Stirlingshire
Motherwell	0 – 0	Kilmarnock
Queen of the South	1 – 2	Greenock Morton
St Johnstone	0 – 1	Aberdeen
St Mirren	0 – 3	Clydebank

=== Replays ===
Home team	Score	Away team
Partick Thistle	3 – 0	Forfar Athletic
Rangers	4 – 1	Raith Rovers
Ayr United	0 – 2	Dunfermline Athletic
Brechin City	0 – 3	Dundee
Cowdenbeath	0 – 1	Clyde
Kilmarnock	1 – 3	Motherwell
Hibernian	3 – 0	Dumbarton

== Fourth round ==
Home team	Score	Away team
Celtic	0 – 0	Hibernian
Airdrieonians	0 – 2	Dundee United
Clydebank	2 – 2	Partick Thistle
Dundee	2 – 0	Motherwell
Dunfermline Athletic	2 – 0	Rangers
East Stirlingshire	2 – 3	Clyde
Hamilton Academical	0 – 2	Aberdeen
Hearts	2 – 0	Greenock Morton

=== Replays ===
Home team	Score	Away team
Partick Thistle	4 – 1	Clydebank
Hibernian	0 – 1	Celtic

== Quarter-finals ==
Home team	Score	Away team
Aberdeen	5 – 0	Clyde
Dundee	0 – 0	Dundee United
Hearts	3 – 0	Dunfermline Athletic
Partick Thistle	0 – 3	Celtic

=== Replay ===
Home team	Score	Away team
Dundee United	2 – 2	Dundee

==== Second Replay ====
Home team	Score	Away team
Dundee	0 – 3	Dundee United

== Semi-finals ==
9 April 1988

Celtic	2–1	Hearts
Andy Walker; Mark McGhee		Brian Whittaker

Hampden Park, Glasgow
Attendance: 66,466
Referee: Kenny Hope

9 April 1988

Aberdeen	0–0	Dundee United

Dens Park, Dundee
Attendance: 20,488

=== Replay ===
13 April 1988

Aberdeen	1–1 (a.e.t.)	Dundee United
Charlie Nicholas		Mixu Paatelainen

Dens Park, Dundee
Attendance: 17,288

==== Second Replay ====
20 April 1988

Aberdeen	0–1	Dundee United
		Iain Ferguson

Dens Park, Dundee
Attendance: 19,048

== Final ==
14 May 1988

Celtic	2–1	Dundee United
McAvennie 76', 90'		Gallacher 49'

Hampden Park, Glasgow
Attendance: 74,000
Referee: George Smith

== See also ==
- 1987–88 in Scottish football
- 1987–88 Scottish League Cup
