= Steve McCahill =

Scottish footballer

Personal information
- Full name: Stephen Joseph McCahill
- Date of birth: 3 September 1966 (age 60)
- Place of birth: Greenock, Scotland
- Position: Centre half

Youth career
- Gleniffer Thistle

Senior career*
Years	Team	Apps	(Gls)
1984–1989	Dumbarton	147	(5)
1989–1992	Celtic	7	(0)
1992–1998	Morton	116	(5)
Total		270	(10)
- * Club domestic league appearances and goals

Steve McCahill (born 3 September 1966) is a former Scottish footballer who played for Dumbarton, Celtic and Morton.

== Career ==
McCahill began his senior career at Boghead playing for Dumbarton and spent nearly five years there, making nearly 150 league appearances for the club. McCahill impressed in a Scottish Cup tie against Celtic in January 1989 and signed for the club a couple of days later.

McCahill made his debut for Celtic on 25 February 1989, coming on as a second-half substitute in a 3–0 win over Dundee at Dens Park. He made a further 4 league appearances for Celtic that season and also played in the Dubai Champions Cup match against Liverpool on 4 April 1989, in which he turned in a highly impressive performance which helped Celtic to a win on penalties after the match had finished 1–1. However, McCahill sustained a fractured jaw in league match against Motherwell on 12 April 1989. McCahill featured rarely for Celtic after that and left on a free transfer to Morton in October 1992.

McCahill played regularly for Morton for the next few years and won a Scottish Second Division league medal in 1995.
