= Paul McLaughlin (footballer) =

Scottish footballer

Personal information
- Full name: Paul McLaughlin
- Date of birth: 9 December 1965 (age 60)
- Place of birth: Johnstone, Scotland
- Position: Left back

Youth career
- Anniesland Waverley

Senior career*
Years	Team	Apps	(Gls)
1982–1983	Clydebank	3	(0)
1983–1984	Anniesland Waverley	0	(0)
1984–1989	Queen's Park	153	(4)
1989–1991	Celtic	3	(0)
1991–1993	Partick Thistle	74	(0)
1993–1994	Derry City	27	(1)
1995–1994	Ards	16	(3)
- * Club domestic league appearances and goals

Paul McLaughlin (born 9 December 1965) is a Scottish former footballer.
