= 1987–88 Scottish League Cup =

Tournament details
- Country: Scotland

Final positions
- Champions: Rangers
- Runners-up: Aberdeen

Tournament statistics
- Top goal scorer: Ally McCoist (6)

The 1987–88 Scottish League Cup was the forty-second season of Scotland's second football knockout competition. The competition was won by Rangers, who defeated Aberdeen in the Final.

== First round ==
| Home team | Score | Away team | Date |
|---|---|---|---|
| Arbroath | 1–3 | Ayr United | 12 August 1987 |
| Berwick Rangers | 1–2 | Stirling Albion | 12 August 1987 |
| Cowdenbeath | 1–3 | Queen's Park | 12 August 1987 |
| St Johnstone | 4–1 | Alloa Athletic | 12 August 1987 |
| Stenhousemuir | 1–3 | East Stirlingshire | 11 August 1987 |
| Stranraer | 0–3 | Albion Rovers | 12 August 1987 |

== Second round ==
| Home team | Score | Away team | Date |
|---|---|---|---|
| Aberdeen | 5–1 | Brechin City | 19 August 1987 |
| Albion Rovers | 1–1 | East Fife | 19 August 1987 |
| Ayr United | 0–1 | Dumbarton | 19 August 1987 |
| Celtic | 3–1 | Forfar Athletic | 19 August 1987 |
| Dundee United | 4–1 | Partick Thistle | 19 August 1987 |
| East Stirlingshire | 1–3 | Dunfermline Ath | 18 August 1987 |
| Heart of Midlothian | 6–1 | Kilmarnock | 19 August 1987 |
| Hibernian | 3–2 | Montrose | 18 August 1987 |
| Meadowbank Thistle | 1–0 | Hamilton Academical | 18 August 1987 |
| Morton | 1–5 | Clyde | 19 August 1987 |
| Motherwell | 3–1 | Airdrieonians | 19 August 1987 |
| Queen of the South | 2–1 | Falkirk | 18 August 1987 |
| Queen's Park | 0–3 | Dundee | 18 August 1987 |
| Raith Rovers | 2–1 | Clydebank | 19 August 1987 |
| St Mirren | 0–1 | St Johnstone | 18 August 1987 |
| Stirling Albion | 1–2 | Rangers | 19 August 1987 |

== Third round ==
| Home team | Score | Away team | Date |
|---|---|---|---|
| Aberdeen | 3–0 | St Johnstone | 26 August 1987 |
| Dumbarton | 1–5 | Celtic | 26 August 1987 |
| Dunfermline Ath | 1–4 | Rangers | 26 August 1987 |
| Heart of Midlothian | 2–0 | Clyde | 25 August 1987 |
| Hibernian | 3–1 | Queen of the South | 25 August 1987 |
| Meadowbank Thistle | 0–3 | Dundee | 26 August 1987 |
| Motherwell | 4–0 | Albion Rovers | 26 August 1987 |
| Raith Rovers | 1–2 | Dundee United | 25 August 1987 |

== Quarter-finals ==
| Home team | Score | Away team | Date |
|---|---|---|---|
| Aberdeen | 1–0 | Celtic | 1 September 1987 |
| Dundee | 2–1 | Dundee United | 2 September 1987 |
| Motherwell | 1–0 | Hibernian | 1 September 1987 |
| Rangers | 4–1 | Heart of Midlothian | 2 September 1987 |

== Semi-finals ==
| Home team | Score | Away team | Date |
|---|---|---|---|
| Aberdeen | 2–0 | Dundee | 23 September 1987 |
| Rangers | 3–1 | Motherwell | 23 September 1987 |

== Final ==
25 October 1987

| Aberdeen | 3 – 3 (3-5) Penalties(AET) | Rangers |
|---|---|---|
| Bett; Falconer; Hewitt | | Cooper; Durrant; Fleck |

Hampden Park, Glasgow
Attendance: 71,961
Referee: Bob Valentine
