= Dugald McCarrison =

Scottish footballer

Personal information
- Full name: Dugald McFarlane McCarrison
- Date of birth: 22 December 1969 (age 56)
- Place of birth: Lanark, Scotland
- Positions: Midfielder; forward

Youth career
- Celtic Boys Club

Senior career*
Years	Team	Apps	(Gls)
1987–1993	Celtic	4	(1)
1990	→Ipswich Town (loan)	0	(0)
1991	→Darlington (loan)	5	(2)
1993–1995	Kilmarnock	9	(1)
1995	Hamilton Academical	3	(0)
1995–1996	Glentoran	11	(1)
1996–?	Lesmahagow		
- * Club domestic league appearances and goals

Dugald McFarlane McCarrison (born 22 December 1969) is a Scottish former footballer. A product of Celtic Boys Club, he went on to play with a number of clubs both professional and amateur.

== Celtic ==
McCarrison signed professional terms with Celtic in 1987 and made his debut in October 1987 in a league game at Celtic Park against Dundee United. However, despite spending five and a half years on the Glasgow club's books, he was unable to force his way regularly into the first team, making only four league appearances. He did score one goal for the club, coming on as a substitute for Andy Walker during a 3–0 win over Dundee at Dens Park in February 1989 – McCarrison scoring Celtic's third goal.

During his time at Celtic Park he also had loan spells at Ipswich Town and Darlington although it was only at the latter that he made any first team appearances. However McCarrison made his mark by scoring as the club beat their local rivals Hartlepool United 4–0.

== Scottish League ==
He left Celtic in February 1993 to sign for Kilmarnock in a deal worth £90,000, the price reflecting McCarrison's goalscoring form in Celtic's reserves. However again he found game time scarce, making six league starts and three substitute appearances during his spell at the club. This time however McCarrison's lack of playing time was due to a severe injury after he broke his leg playing in a gala game during that summer. McCarrison missed nearly two years of football recuperating and later blamed this on his failure to make an impact in football.

== Later career ==
He moved to Hamilton Academical in August 1995 but made only a few appearances before joining Irish Football League side Glentoran that October. McCarrison's only goal for the Belfast club came in a 4–0 win over their arch rivals Linfield at Windsor Park on 4 November 1995. However, before long McCarrison, who continued to live in Scotland, was released after Glentoran said they could not afford to pay him to commute.

He joined non-league Lesmahagow that summer and was still playing for the club in 2002.

It was reported in August 2016 in the Scottish press that McCarrison had admitted to stealing thousands of pounds worth of specialist engineering equipment while working as a storeman in Scotland.
