= Tony Shepherd =

Scottish footballer

Personal information
- Full name: Anthony Shepherd
- Date of birth: 16 November 1966 (age 59)
- Place of birth: Glasgow, Scotland
- Height: 1.79 m (5 ft 10 in)
- Position: Midfielder

Youth career
- Celtic Boys Club

Senior career*
Years	Team	Apps	(Gls)
1983–1989	Celtic	41	(3)
1988	→ Bristol City (loan)	3	(0)
1989–1991	Carlisle United	75	(8)
1991–1993	Motherwell	16	(0)
1993–1995	Portadown	34	(4)
1995	Partick Thistle	3	(0)
1995–1996	Ayr United	15	(0)
1996	Stranraer	3	(0)
1996	Glenavon	32	(2)
1996–1997	Cliftonville	16	(0)
1997–1998	Albion Rovers	17	(3)
Total		255	(20)
- * Club domestic league appearances and goals

Anthony Shepherd (born 16 November 1966) is a Scottish former footballer. He was a midfielder coming from the Celtic Boys Club.

Shepherd signed with the senior Celtic side in August 1983 and debuted at Parkhead in a 2-1 Scottish Cup victory over Queen's Park on 15 February 1986, providing assists for both the goals in that game for Brian McClair and Roy Aitken. He was sent off in the 1986 Scottish League Cup Final when the referee assumed he had been struck by Shepherd from behind. When the referee accepted that he had been hit by a coin and not by Shepherd, he allowed Shepherd to remain on the field.

Shepherd struggled to hold down a first team place at Celtic and was sent on loan to Bristol City during the 1988/89 season. He left Celtic in 1989 and had spells with clubs including Carlisle United, Motherwell, Portadown and Cliftonville.

== Honours ==
- County Antrim Shield
  - Cliftonville 1997
