= Benny Rooney =

Scottish footballer (1943–2023)

Personal information
- Full name: Bernard Rooney
- Date of birth: 3 May 1943
- Place of birth: Glasgow, Scotland
- Date of death: 28 July 2023 (aged 80)
- Position: Defender

Senior career*
Years	Team	Apps	(Gls)
1959–1963	Celtic	0	(0)
1959–1960	→ Cambuslang Rangers (loan)		
1960–1961	→ Petershill (loan)		
1961–1962	→ Dumbarton (loan)	6	(0)
1963–1966	Dundee United	22	(4)
1966–1973	St Johnstone	222	(12)
1973–1976	Partick Thistle	62	(3)

Managerial career
- 1976–1983: Greenock Morton
- 1983–1986: Partick Thistle
- 1986: Albion Rovers
- * Club domestic league appearances and goals

Bernard Rooney (3 May 1943 – 28 July 2023) was a Scottish football player and manager.

== Playing career ==
Rooney played for Celtic as a youth and was a contemporary of the group of players who would form the core of their Lisbon Lions team, but was unable to break into the team in the face of such stiff competition for a place, and after being loaned out to the junior leagues and to Dumbarton, he was allowed to sign for Dundee United on a free transfer in 1963. He was frequently relegated to United's reserve team, however, and he was eventually sold to St Johnstone in 1966 for £3,500.

Rooney served the Perth club for nearly a decade during a very successful period for the club under the management of Willie Ormond. Rooney was the club's captain during their UEFA Cup run of 1971–72, when they defeated Hamburg and Vasas Budapest. He was also captain for Saints' first ever national final when they lost 1–0 to Celtic in the Scottish League Cup Final at Hampden Park in 1969. As a key member of the Ormond era, Rooney has a place in St Johnstone history for the fans.

== Managerial career ==
Rooney was appointed manager of Morton in 1976. Morton were part-time and competing in the First Division at the time. In his second season in charge he led the club to promotion to the Scottish Premier Division. In the 1979–80 season Morton famously topped the Premier Division in the middle of the season, and ultimately finished in 6th place, quite an achievement for a part-time club.

Rooney is also revered by Morton fans for assembling a memorable squad, including fan favourite Andy Ritchie, who was brought to Cappielow from Celtic in 1976.

Rooney left Morton in 1983, and went on to manage Partick Thistle and Albion Rovers, before returning to his first club Celtic briefly as a coach.

== Personal life ==
Benny Rooney had two children with wife Marion. His son Kevin is an actor, whilst his father, Bob, had been physiotherapist at Celtic in the successful Jock Stein managerial era at the club.

Rooney's great-nephew Shaun Rooney is also a footballer. He emulated his great uncle by playing for St Johnstone in the February 2021 Scottish League Cup Final, scoring the only goal of the game; he also scored the winning goal in the 2021 Scottish Cup Final three months later.

Rooney died in July 2023, at the age of 80.
