= Lex Baillie =

Scottish footballer (born 1966)

Personal information
- Date of birth: 6 July 1966 (age 60)
- Place of birth: Hamilton, Scotland
- Position: Central defender

Youth career
- Burnbank Boys Club
- 1982–1987: Celtic

Senior career*
Years	Team	Apps	(Gls)
1987–1991	Celtic	32	(1)
1990	→ Toronto Blizzard (loan)	22	(3)
1991–1993	St Mirren	56	(4)
1993–1994	Dunfermline Athletic	15	(0)
Total		103	(5)
- * Club domestic league appearances and goals

Lex Baillie (born 6 July 1966) is a Scottish former professional footballer who played as a central defender. Born in Hamilton, Baillie played for Burnbank Boys Club, Celtic, St Mirren and Dunfermline Athletic. After retiring as a player, Baillie became a police officer, and was the subject of a 2007 TV documentary.

Baillie is the son of sports journalist and former Rangers player, Doug Baillie.

== Playing career ==
Baillie signed for Celtic from Burnbank Boys Club in August 1982. After several years in the youth team and reserves, he made his first team debut on 22 December 1987 in a 2–0 away win over Falkirk in the league. Baillie went on to make 13 appearances in the league that season (1987–88) for Celtic, playing in 2-0 (at Parkhead) and 2-1 (at Ibrox) wins over Rangers, and helped the club to the League Championship title. He failed to establish himself as a regular in the team after that though, and spent the summer of 1990 on loan at Toronto Blizzard in the Canadian Soccer League.

In June 1991, Baillie left Celtic to join St Mirren for a fee of £90,000. He spent two seasons at Love Street before being released in the summer of 1993. Baillie then signed for Dunfermline in August 1993 on a one-year contract, before retiring from football at the end of that season.
