= 1986–87 Celtic F.C. season =

Celtic
1986–87 season
- Chairman: Thomas L. Devlin (until Sep 1986) Jack C. McGinn (from Sep 1986)
- Manager: Davie Hay
- Scottish Premier Division: 2nd (runners-up)
- Scottish Cup: 4th Round
- Scottish League Cup: Finalists
- European Cup: 2nd round
- Top goalscorer: League: Brian McClair (35); All: Brian McClair (41)
- Average home league attendance: 25,311

After clinching the league title in dramatic fashion the previous season, Celtic entered the 1986–87 campaign as defending champions. It marked manager Davie Hay’s first league championship since his appointment in the summer of 1983, and this coming season would be his fourth season in charge. The club's objectives for the season included retaining the league title and making progress on their return to the European Cup.

== Season Overview ==
There were no major additions to the first-team squad during the summer. Three young players were recruited: Northern Irish full-back Anton Rogan, plus fellow countryman and goalkeeper Allen McKnight were signed from Lisburn Distillery, then winger Mark Smith, was signed from Queen's Park. As the season progressed, the lack of significant investment in the playing squad became a source of tension between Hay and the club's board of directors. Plus media speculation about the futures of star strikers Mo Johnston and Brian McClair increased as the season progressed.

Celtic enjoyed a fairly successful pre-season, which included a tour of Ireland and two victories against English First Division opposition. These results generated optimism ahead of the competitive campaign.

=== August ===
The season began with Celtic unfurling the league flag at home, followed by a victory over Dundee. This was succeeded by two away wins against Motherwell and Clydebank, maintaining an unbeaten start in the league.

The League Cup campaign (now known as the Skol Cup for sponsorship reasons) also commenced in August. Celtic recorded home victories against Airdrieonians and Dumbarton in the second and third rounds respectively. While comfortable, the performances were not entirely convincing but set up a quarter-final tie against Aberdeen in September.

The remaining league fixtures in August included a 1–1 draw away to title rivals Aberdeen, a match that underlined why both clubs were widely regarded as the strongest teams in the division. The following weekend the faced Glasgow rivals Rangers, who hadn't won the league championship since 1978, but had heavily invested in their squad since Graeme Souness arrived in April 1986, with England Internationals Chris Woods and Terry Butcher being the main attractions brought in over the summer. The first old firm test of the season saw Rangers win 1-0 comfortably outplaying Celtic for most of the game.

=== September ===
Following defeat in the Old Firm derby, Celtic responded positively in September with a strong run of form. In league competition, the team recorded three wins and a draw, re-establishing momentum in the title race. Celtic also progressed in the Skol Cup, advancing through both the quarter-final and semi-final stages. Victories over Aberdeen and Motherwell were secured via penalty shoot-outs, setting up a final against city rivals Rangers. In terms of transfers, manager Davie Hay confirmed that striker Alan McInally was not available for transfer and would remain at the club as cover for first-choice forwards Mo Johnston and Brian McClair. During September Celtic Chairman Thomas Devlin passed away at the age of 72 after a long illness, he was appointed Chairman in June 1985 after the sudden death of long serving Chairman Desmond White. Devlin had been a director of Celtic since 1949 where he succeeded his father Thomas L. Devlin Snr, who briefly served as a director from 1940 until his death in 1941.

=== October ===
Celtic continued their strong league form by winning all their league fixtures during the month of October, claiming five wins out of five. The 26th October Celtic faced Rangers in the Skol League Cup final at Hampden Park, a controversial match ensued with Mo Johnston being red carded for Celtic before Tony Shepherd was also sent off but refused to leave the field. Rangers clinched the first trophy of the domestic season thanks to a late Davie Cooper penalty awarded after much protest from Celtic.

In the European Cup, Celtic progressed comfortably through the first round, defeating Shamrock Rovers 3–0 on aggregate, although performances were widely regarded as unconvincing. This victory set up a challenging second-round tie against Soviet champions and reigning European Cup Winners’ Cup holders Dinamo Kiev. Celtic were eliminated after a 4–2 aggregate defeat to the Soviet side.

=== November ===
Celtic kept up their league form in November, winning all of their fixtures except for a draw away to Aberdeen. However, performances declined in December, with the team managing only one victory, alongside three draws and a defeat to Hearts. Despite the downturn in results, Celtic entered the New Year still leading the league by five points, although Rangers had a game in hand. The Old Firm derby at the turn of the year proved pivotal, as Rangers delivered a composed performance against a poor Celtic side to secure a 2–0 victory. The result significantly dented Celtic's title challenge while providing momentum for Rangers.

Celtic would drop further points during the January and February, many citing that although Celtic had a potent strike force, their poor defense cost them points. Davie Hay's efforts to strengthen the team fell on deaf ears from the board led by new Chairman Jack McGinn. In February Davie Hay appointed Tommy Craig as his assistant manager, the role had been vacant since the controversial sacking of Frank Connor during the previous season. There was not much cheer either in the Scottish Cup, a third round victory over Aberdeen after two replays was followed by a fourth round defeat to Hearts who ended Celtic's hopes of any cup silverware for the season.

The only trophy left was the League title but a 4–1 defeat away to Dundee at the end of February allowed Rangers to claim top spot. Another defeat away at Pittodrie at the hands of Aberdeen saw Celtic's title challenge falter even further. Although Celtic did regain some form in March and April including a win against Rangers at Celtic Park, further points dropped against Dundee Utd and Rangers hitting form, meant the league title would go to Ibrox for the first time in nine years and Celtic would end the season without a trophy. A poor defeat to Falkirk at home on the second last weekend of the season would seal the fate of the title.

Celtic would go trophyless into their centenary season, with speculation around several players futures, especially Celtic's top two strikers Mo Johnston and Brian McClair. There also was talk about Davie Hay's suitability to continue to lead the team.

== Pre-season and friendlies ==
Celtic prepared for the 1986–87 with a summer tour of Ireland in late July, playing 3 games including Pat Bonner's twin brother Denis testimonial game in Galway. The then followed up with a home friendly against Aston Villa and then finished up pre season preparation by travelling to London to play in David O'Leary's testimonial match at Highbury.

27 July 1986 Friendly	Longford Town (Republic of Ireland)	1-1	(Scotland) Celtic	Longford, Republic of Ireland
19:00 GMT		Report	Archdeacon 7'	Stadium: Rugby Ground; Attendance: 10,000

29 July 1986 Denis Bonner Testimonial	Galway United F.C. (Republic of Ireland)	0-2	(Scotland) Celtic	Galway, Republic of Ireland
19:00 GMT		Report

31 July 1986 Friendly	Cobh Ramblers F.C. (Republic of Ireland)	1–4	(Scotland) Celtic	Cobh, Republic of Ireland
19:15 GMT		Report		Stadium: St Colman's Park

2 August 1986 Friendly	Celtic (Scotland)	1–0	(England) Aston Villa F.C.	Glasgow, Scotland
15:00 GMT	McClair 24'	Report		Stadium: Celtic Park; Referee: Kenny Hope (Clarkston)

5 August 1986 David O'Leary Testimonial	Arsenal (England)	0–2	(Scotland) Celtic	London, England
		Report	Johnston 80', McInally 85'	Stadium: Highbury; Attendance: 30,000

== Competitions ==
=== Scottish Premier Division ===
==== League table ====
Pos	Team	Pld	W	D	L	GF	GA	GD	Pts	Qualification or relegation
1	Rangers (C)	44	31	7	6	85	23	+62	69	Qualification for the European Cup first round
2	Celtic	44	27	9	8	90	41	+49	63	Qualification for the UEFA Cup first round
3	Dundee United	44	24	12	8	66	36	+30	60	Qualification for the UEFA Cup first round
4	Aberdeen	44	21	16	7	63	29	+34	58	Qualification for the UEFA Cup first round
5	Heart of Midlothian	44	21	14	9	64	43	+21	56	

Source: Statto
Rules for classification: 1) points; 2) goal difference; 3) number of goals scored.
(C) Champions

==== Matches ====
9 August 1986 Premier League	Celtic	1–0	Dundee	Glasgow
15:00	Johnston 4'	Report		Stadium: Celtic Park; Attendance: 35,443; Referee: T. Muirhead (Stenhousemuir)

13 August 1986 Premier League	Motherwell	0–4	Celtic	Motherwell
19:30	McClair 28', Johnston 46', Johnston 65', McClair 88'	Report		Stadium: Fir Park; Attendance: 13,225; Referee: George Smith (Edinburgh)

16 August 1986 Premier League	Clydebank	0–1	Celtic	Clydebank
15:00		Report	Johnston 88'	Stadium: Kilbowie Park; Attendance: 10,286; Referee: W. Knowles (Inverurie)

23 August 1986 Premier League	Celtic	1–1	Aberdeen	Glasgow
15:00	MacLeod 58'	Report	Miller 23'	Stadium: Celtic Park; Attendance: 46,073; Referee: A. Waddell (Edinburgh)

31 August 1986 Premier League	Rangers	1–0	Celtic	Glasgow
15:00 GMT	Durrant 73'	Report		Stadium: Ibrox Stadium; Attendance: 43,970; Referee: K. Hope (Clarkston)

6 September 1986 Premier League	Celtic	4–1	Hamilton Academical	Glasgow
15:00 GMT				Stadium: Celtic Park; Attendance: 16,386

13 September 1986 Premier League	Dundee United	2–2	Celtic	Dundee
15:00 GMT				Stadium: Tannadice Park; Attendance: 20,181

20 September 1986 Premier League	Celtic	5–1	Hibernian	Glasgow
15:00 GMT				Stadium: Celtic Park; Attendance: 20,940

27 September 1986 Premier League	Falkirk	0–1	Celtic	Falkirk
15:00 GMT				Stadium: Brockville Park; Attendance: 12,784

4 October 1986 Premier League	Celtic	2–0	St Mirren	Glasgow
15:00 GMT				Stadium: Celtic Park; Attendance: 19,258

8 October 1986 Premier League	Celtic	2–0	Hearts	Glasgow
19:30 GMT				Stadium: Celtic Park; Attendance: 32,382

11 October 1986 Premier League	Dundee	0–3	Celtic	Dundee
15:00 GMT				Stadium: Dens Park; Attendance: 15,351

18 October 1986 Premier League	Celtic	3–1	Motherwell	Glasgow
15:00 GMT				Stadium: Celtic Park; Attendance: 17,735

29 October 1986 Premier League	Celtic	6–0	Clydebank	Glasgow
15:00 GMT				Stadium: Celtic Park; Attendance: 8,861

1 November 1986 Premier League	Celtic	1–1	Rangers	Glasgow
15:00 GMT				Stadium: Celtic Park; Attendance: 60,207

8 November 1986 Premier League	Hamilton Academical	1–2	Celtic	Hamilton
15:00 GMT				Stadium: Douglas Park; Attendance: 10,000

15 November 1986 Premier League	Celtic	1–0	Dundee United	Glasgow
15:00 GMT				Stadium: Celtic Park; Attendance: 31,323

19 November 1986 Premier League	Hibernian	0–1	Celtic	Edinburgh
19:30 GMT				Stadium: Easter Road; Attendance: 15,397

22 November 1986 Premier League	Celtic	4–2	Falkirk	Glasgow
15:00 GMT				Stadium: Celtic Park; Attendance: 14,945

26 November 1986 Premier League	Aberdeen	1–1	Celtic	Aberdeen
19:30 GMT				Stadium: Pittodrie Stadium; Attendance: 22,040

29 November 1986 Premier League	St Mirren	0–1	Celtic	Paisley
15:00 GMT				Stadium: St Mirren Park, Love Street); Attendance: 16,233

3 December 1986 Premier League	Hearts	1–0	Celtic	Edinburgh
19:30 GMT				Stadium: Tynecastle Park; Attendance: 25,886

6 December 1986 Premier League	Celtic	2–0	Dundee	Glasgow
15:00 GMT				Stadium: Celtic Park; Attendance: 17,300

13 December 1986 Premier League	Motherwell	1–1	Celtic	Motherwell
15:00 GMT				Stadium: Fir Park; Attendance: 11,760

20 December 1986 Premier League	Celtic	1–1	Aberdeen	Glasgow
15:00 GMT				Stadium: Celtic Park; Attendance: 32,264

27 December 1986 Premier League	Clydebank	1–1	Celtic	Clydebank
15:00 GMT				Stadium: Kilbowie Park; Attendance: 8,569

1 January 1987 Premier League	Rangers	2–0	Celtic	Glasgow
15:00 GMT				Stadium: Ibrox Stadium; Attendance: 42,793

3 January 1987 Premier League	Celtic	8–3	Hamilton Academical	Glasgow
15:00 GMT				Stadium: Celtic Park; Attendance: 14,380

10 January 1987 Premier League	Dundee United	3–2	Celtic	Dundee
15:00 GMT				Stadium: Tannadice Park; Attendance: 19,020

21 January 1987 Premier League	Celtic	1–0	Hibernian	Glasgow
19:30 GMT				Stadium: Celtic Park; Attendance: 19,583

24 January 1987 Premier League	Falkirk	1–2	Celtic	Falkirk
15:00 GMT				Stadium: Brockville Park; Attendance: 11,568

7 February 1987 Premier League	Celtic	3–0	St Mirren	Glasgow
15:00 GMT				Stadium: Celtic Park; Attendance: 18,138

14 February 1987 Premier League	Celtic	1–1	Hearts	Glasgow
15:00 GMT				Stadium: Celtic Park; Attendance: 36,214

28 February 1987 Premier League	Dundee	4–1	Celtic	Dundee
15:00 GMT				Stadium: Dens Park; Attendance: 12,455

7 March 1987 Premier League	Celtic	3–1	Motherwell	Glasgow
15:00 GMT				Stadium: Celtic Park; Attendance: 12,840

14 March 1987 Premier League	Aberdeen	1–0	Celtic	Aberdeen
15:00 GMT				Stadium: Pittodrie Stadium; Attendance: 17,918

21 March 1987 Premier League	Celtic	3–0	Clydebank	Glasgow
15:00 GMT				Stadium: Celtic Park; Attendance: 11,092

28 March 1987 Premier League	Hamilton Academical	2–3	Celtic	Hamilton
19:30 GMT				Stadium: Douglas Park; Attendance: 8,505

4 April 1987 Premier League	Celtic	3–1	Rangers	Glasgow
15:00 GMT				Stadium: Celtic Park; Attendance: 60,066

11 April 1987 Premier League	Hibernian	1–4	Celtic	Edinburgh
15:00 GMT				Stadium: Easter Road; Attendance: 14,432

18 April 1987 Premier League	Celtic	1–1	Dundee United	Glasgow
15:00 GMT				Stadium: Celtic Park; Attendance: 28,798

25 April 1987 Premier League	St Mirren	1–3	Celtic	Paisley
15:00 GMT				Stadium: St Mirren Park, Love Street; Attendance: 11,680

2 May 1987 Premier League	Celtic	1–2	Falkirk	Glasgow
15:00 GMT				Stadium: Celtic Park; Attendance: 11,238

9 May 1987 Premier League	Hearts	1–0	Celtic	Edinburgh
15:00 GMT				Stadium: Tynecastle Park; Attendance: 12,596

=== Scottish Cup ===
1 February 1987 Third round	Aberdeen	2–2	Celtic	Aberdeen
15:00 GMT				Stadium: Pittodrie Stadium; Attendance: 23,000

4 February 1987 Third round replay	Celtic	0–0	Aberdeen	Glasgow
19:30 GMT				Stadium: Celtic Park; Attendance: 55,405

9 February 1987 Third round 2nd Replay	Celtic	1–0	Aberdeen	Dundee
19:30 GMT				Stadium: Dens Park; Attendance: 21,255

21 February 1987 Fourth round	Hearts	1–0	Celtic	Edinburgh
15:00 GMT				Stadium: Tynecastle Park; Attendance: 28,891

=== Scottish League Cup ===
20 August 1986 Second round	Celtic	2–0	Airdrieonians	Glasgow
19:30 GMT				Stadium: Celtic Park; Attendance: 13,168

27 August 1986 Third round	Celtic	3–0	Dumbarton	Glasgow
19:30 GMT		Report	Johnston 43', McStay 78', Johnston 84'	Stadium: Celtic Park; Attendance: 11,390

3 September 1986 Quarter-final	Aberdeen	1–1	Celtic	Aberdeen
19:30 GMT				Stadium: Pittodrie Stadium; Attendance: 21,509

23 September 1986 Semi-final	Celtic	2–2	Motherwell	Glasgow
19:30 GMT				Stadium: Hampden Park; Attendance: 24,451

26 October 1986 Final	Celtic	1–2	Rangers	Glasgow
15:00 GMT		Report		Stadium: Hampden Park; Attendance: 74,219

=== European Cup ===
17 September 1986 1st round 1st leg	Shamrock Rovers (Republic of Ireland)	0–1	(Scotland) Celtic	Dublin
20:00 GMT				Stadium: Glenmalure Park; Attendance: 18,000

1 October 1986 1st round 2nd leg	Celtic (Scotland)	2–0 (3–0 agg.)	(Republic of Ireland) Shamrock Rovers	Glasgow
20:00 GMT				Stadium: Celtic Park; Attendance: 27,272

22 October 1986 2nd round 1st leg	Celtic (Scotland)	1–1	(Soviet Union) Dinamo Kiev	Glasgow
20:00 GMT				Stadium: Celtic Park; Attendance: 47,858

5 November 1986 2nd round 2nd leg	Dinamo Kiev (Soviet Union)	3–1 (4–2 agg.)	(Scotland) Celtic	Kiev
20:00 GMT				Stadium: Republican Stadium; Attendance: 107,000

=== Dubai Super Cup ===
9 December 1986 Dubai Super Cup	Celtic (Scotland)	1–1 (2–4 pen.)	(England) Liverpool	Dubai
20:00 GMT	Archdeacon 50'		Hansen 89'	Stadium: Al Wasl Stadium; Attendance: 15,000

=== Glasgow Cup ===
10 March 1987 Semi-final	Partick Thistle	0–1	Celtic	Maryhill, Glasgow
19:30 GMT				Stadium: Firhill; Attendance: 3,417

7 May 1987 Final	Celtic	0–1	Rangers	Glasgow
19:30 GMT				Stadium: Celtic Park

== Statistics ==
=== Appearances and goals ===
Pos.		Name	League		Scottish Cup		League Cup		European Cup		Other		Total	
Pos.		Name	Apps	Goals	Apps	Goals	Apps	Goals	Apps	Goals	Apps	Goals	Apps	Goals
GK	(Republic of Ireland)	Pat Bonner	42	0	5	0	3	0	4	0	0	0	56	0
GK	(England)	Peter Latchford	1	0	0	0	0	0	0	0	0	0	1	0
DF	(Scotland)	Roy Aitken	42	1	3	0	5	1	4	0	0	0	55	2
DF	(Republic of Ireland)	Pierce O'Leary	15	1	0	0	0	0	0	0	0	0	15	1
DF	(Scotland)	Danny McGrain	21	0	4	0	1	0	2	0	0	0	28	0
DF	(Scotland)	Paul McGugan	21	0	0	0	3	0	1	0	0	0	25	0
DF	(Republic of Ireland)	Willie McStay	15	0	4	0	0	0	2	0	0	0	21	0
DF	(Northern Ireland)	Anton Rogan	10	1	4	0	0	0	0	0	0	0	14	1
DF	(Scotland)	Derek Whyte	42	0	4	0	5	0	3	0	0	0	54	0
MF	(Scotland)	Tommy Burns	14	0	0	0	3	0	3	0	0	0	20	0
MF	(Scotland)	Peter Grant	32	1	4	0	2	0	3	0	0	0	41	1
MF	(Scotland)	Paul McStay	42	3	4	0	5	1	4	0	0	0	56	4
MF	(Scotland)	Murdo MacLeod	37	4	4	0	5	0	4	1	0	0	50	5
MF	(Scotland)	Tony Shepherd	16	2	0	0	1	0	3	0	0	0	20	2
MF	(Scotland)	Mark Smith	3	0	0	0	2	0	0	0	0	0	5	0
MF	(Scotland)	Owen Archdeacon	12	2	0	0	1	0	0	0	0	0	13	2
FW	(Scotland)	Brian McClair	43	35	4	2	5	4	4	0	0	0	56	41
FW	(Scotland)	Mo Johnston	39	23	4	0	5	3	4	3	0	0	52	29
FW	(Scotland)	Mark McGhee	6	1	0	0	1	0	1	1	0	0	8	0
FW	(Scotland)	Alan McInally	29	15	4	1	2	0	2	0	0	0	37	16

=== Goalscorers ===
R	Pos.	Nation	Name	Premier Division	Scottish Cup	League Cup	European Cup	Total
1	FW	(Scotland)	Brian McClair	35	2	4	0	41
2	FW	(Scotland)	Mo Johnston	23	0	3	3	29
3	FW	(Scotland)	Alan McInally	15	1	0	0	16
4	MF	(Scotland)	Murdo MacLeod	4	0	0	1	5
5	MF	(Scotland)	Paul McStay	3	0	1	0	5
6	MF	(Scotland)	Roy Aitken	1	0	1	0	2
6	MF	(Scotland)	Owen Archdeacon	2	0	0	0	2
6	FW	(Scotland)	Mark McGhee	1	0	0	1	2
6	MF	(Scotland)	Tony Shepherd	2	0	0	0	2
7	MF	(Scotland)	Peter Grant	1	0	0	0	1
7	DF	(Scotland)	Pierce O'Leary	1	0	0	0	1
7	MF	(Northern Ireland)	Anton Rogan	1	0	0	0	1
Total				89	3	9	5	107

== Club Staff ==
Board of Directors
Position	Name
Chairman	Thomas L. Devlin (until September 1986) John C. McGinn (from September 1986)
Vice-Chairman	John C. McGinn (until September 1986) Kevin Kelly (from September 1986
Secretary	Christopher D. White
Directors	James L. Farrell; Thomas J. Grant; Kevin Kelly; Christopher D. White

Football Staff
Position	Name
Manager	David Hay
Assistant Manager	Tommy Craig (appointed February 1987)
Reserve Team Coach	Bobby Lennox
Physio	Brian Scott
Masseur	Jimmy Steele
Kitman	Neil Mochan

== Transfers ==
=== In ===
Pos	Player	From	Type	Date	Fee
DF	(Northern Ireland) Anton Rogan	(Northern Ireland) Lisburn Distillery	Transfer	May 1986	Free
MF	(Scotland) Mark Smith	(Scotland) Queen's Park	Transfer	June 1986	Free
GK	(Northern Ireland) Allen McKnight	(Northern Ireland) Lisburn Distillery	Transfer	August 1986	Free
			TOTAL		£0

=== Out ===
Pos	Player	From	Type	Date	Fee
DF	(Scotland) James McKechnie	(Northern Ireland) Derry City	Transfer	June 1986	Free
MF	(Scotland) Paul Chalmers	(Scotland) St Mirren	Transfer	September 1986	£20,000
DF	(Scotland) Willie McStay	(England) Huddersfield Town	Transfer	March 1987	£25,000
DF	(Scotland) Ronnie Coyle	(England) Middlesbrough	Transfer	March 1987	£5,000
			TOTAL		£50,000
