= 1985–86 Celtic F.C. season =

Celtic
1985–86 season
- Chairman: Thomas L. Devlin
- Manager: Davie Hay
- Stadium: Celtic Park
- Scottish Premier Division: 1st (champions)
- Scottish Cup: 5th Round
- Scottish League Cup: Quarter-finalists
- European Cup Winners' Cup: 1st round
- Top goalscorer: League: Brian McClair (22); All: Brian McClair (26)
- Average home league attendance: 25,335

The 1985–86 Scottish football season was to be Davie Hay's 3rd season in charge after winning his first trophy, the Scottish Cup the previous season, Celtic were looking to compete for the Scottish Premier Division league title that Aberdeen had won the two previous seasons under Manager Alex Ferguson.

== Season Overview ==
The club would begin the season with a new chairman, Thomas Devlin who had been a director since 1949 took over the job from Desmond White who died suddenly while on holiday in Greece during the summer. Desmond White an important figure in the clubs history, had been chairman since 1971, when he took over from Sir Robert Kelly, he had been a director since 1947 when he succeeded his father Thomas White on the board of directors.

Celtic were linked with several players during the summer, especially strikers to replace cup winning hero Frank McGarvey who was surprisingly sold to St Mirren just after scoring the winning goal in the 1985 Scottish Cup Final. Full backs Graeme Sinclair and Mark Reid had already departed in May. The club was linked with various players during the pre-season, speculation included players such as Pat Nevin and Frank Gray. It would take until November for Celtic to make a signing when they brought in ex Aberdeen hero Mark McGhee from German Bundesliga team Hamburg.

=== August ===
The domestic season began with a draw away to Hearts at Tynecastle, followed by consecutive league victories. Celtic's League Cup campaign opened with two comfortable wins against lower-league opposition, defeating Queen of the South and Brechin City. August concluded with a strong performance at Celtic Park against Rangers, with the Old Firm encounter ending in a draw after a closely contested match.

=== September ===
September began with disappointment in the League Cup. Celtic were eliminated following a dramatic 4–4 draw after extra time away to Hibernian, before losing the subsequent penalty shoot-out. The team responded positively in league competition, recording three wins from three matches to maintain momentum in the early stages of the season. Celtic's European campaign in the European Cup Winners’ Cup also began during the month, with a challenging first-round draw against Atlético Madrid. Celtic achieved a creditable 1–1 draw in the first leg away in Madrid. September 1985 was also marked by tragedy with the death of former Celtic and Scotland manager Jock Stein. Stein collapsed and died while attending Scotland's World Cup qualifying match, in which the national team secured the point required to reach the play-offs for the 1986 FIFA World Cup in Mexico.

=== October ===
Celtic's European campaign came to an end in October following a poor second-leg performance against Atlético Madrid, played behind closed doors. The sanction had been imposed by UEFA as a result of crowd disturbances during the previous season's fixture against Rapid Wien in the UEFA Cup. Domestically, Celtic began the month at the top of the league table but experienced inconsistent form. Victories over St Mirren and Clydebank were offset by home defeats to Hearts and Dundee United These results caused Celtic to relinquish first place, and they finished the month second in the table behind Aberdeen on goal difference.

=== November ===
Inconsistent league form continued into November, with the team opening the month with consecutive defeats. A heavy loss away to league leaders Aberdeen at Pittodrie. was followed by a home defeat to a dominant Rangers side. These results saw Celtic fall to third place in the table, three points behind Aberdeen and one point adrift of Rangers. A home victory over Clydebank, with both goals scored by new signing Mark McGhee, helped stabilize results However, a subsequent draw away to Hibernian delayed any sustained return to form.

=== December ===
December began with a hard-fought draw against an improving Hearts side, a result that saw them drop to fourth place in the league. Aberdeen remained top of the table, with Hearts in second and Rangers narrowly ahead of Celtic on goal difference. A scheduled fixture against Motherwell was postponed due to heavy rain. Celtic returned to league action on Monday, 23 December, suffering a 1–0 defeat away to Dundee United. The result further weakened their position in the title race, leaving the club in fifth place and four points behind leaders Hearts, although Celtic had played three matches fewer. Celtic ended the calendar year with a victory over Clydebank, moving back into fourth position and setting the stage for a crucial New Year's Day encounter with Rangers at Celtic Park.

=== January ===
Celtic began the New Year with a 2–0 victory over rivals Rangers, a result that revitalized their league campaign and left Rangers trailing in the championship race. Despite the win, Celtic still faced a challenge to close the gap on Aberdeen, Hearts, and Dundee United, who occupied the positions above them in the table. In their next fixture, Celtic were defeated 4–2 by a strong Dundee United side; however, this proved to be their final league loss of the season. Two subsequent draws against Aberdeen and Hibernian slowed momentum, but a home victory over Motherwell helped preserve their title ambitions. The home victory against Motherwell would prove to be Davie Provan's last game before having to retire due to illness., Celtic's Scottish Cup campaign also commenced in January, beginning with a 2–0 win over St Johnstone.

=== February ===
February began with a comeback win away to Dundee which kept Celtic in the title race, 4 points off leaders Hearts but with 2 games in hand. On Monday 3 February Celtic moved to sack assistant manager Frank Connor, this news was quite a shock especially to the players. A slim win The next two league matches saw a dip in league form which would see Celtic draw against St. Mirren and Hearts both games at home.

=== March ===
Scottish Cup participation ended at the beginning of March with a last gasp defeat 4-3 defeat against Hibernian at Easter Road, this was followed by two draws, dropping points to Dundee United away in a 1-1 draw, then a dramatic 4-4 draw at Ibrox against old rivals Rangers saw Celtic stutter again in the title race, now in 4th place 7 points behind leaders Hearts, the league title was looking increasingly out of reach if recent form continued. Finally after a run of four league games without a win, Celtic won the final game of the month away to Clydebank with a convincing second half performance to deliver a 0-5 away win and 2 crucial points.

=== April ===
Now out of all the Cup competitions, Celtic had only the league title left to challenge for. April would see Celtic face a marathon six league fixtures, all crucial in the race for the League Championship. Celtic began the month sitting in 4th place on 36 points, 9 points behind leaders Hearts, who had 45 points, Dundee Utd sat 2nd on 40 points and 3rd placed Aberdeen on 38 points. Celtic did have 3 games in hand over the league leaders but it would be a challenge to close the gap. A win at home midweek to Dundee was followed by a last gasp away win to St. Mirren, thanks to improvised striker Paul McStay's 87th minute goal, helped Celtic continue a winning run and close the gap with league leaders Hearts to 5 points. The following Saturday Celtic claimed a win with a stylish victory over Champions Aberdeen at Pittodrie, a Mo Johnston goal was enough to claim full points, but Hearts won convincingly 3-0 away to fellow title contenders Dundee United, keeping the gap at 5 points and still looking like favorites to clinch the title with only four games left. A win against Hibs at home, thanks to two late goals, kept Celtic with some faint hope of catching leaders Hearts, this was followed by another win at home against Dundee. Celtic were now 4 points behind with two league fixtures left, Hearts had played one more game and would not play until the last day of the season away to Dundee at the start of May. Celtic won their game in hand a midweek victory away to Motherwell, setting up a last day of the season tie away to St. Mirren, hoping that Hearts would lose and that Celtic would win by 4 goals. This would be enough to clinch Davie Hay's first League title as Manager and Celtic's first since the 1982/83 season.

=== May ===
Saturday 3 May 1986 is considered one of the most dramatic finishes to a Championship race, Celtic went 4-0 up by half time, but Hearts will still 0-0 at Dens Park against Dundee, this would mean the title was still going to Tynecastle for the first time in 26 years. Another goal by Brian McClair in the 54th minute gained a cheer from the massive travelling Celtic support but it was nothing compared to the noise and joy that would break out amongst the Celtic fans when they got news that Dundee had scored in the 83rd minute thanks to Albert Kidd, and once Kidd made it 2-0 to Dundee in the 86th minute Celtic fans began to celebrate a dramatic title win.

== Pre-season and friendlies ==
Celtic prepared for the 1985–86 season with a summer tour Sweden during late July and early August, playing 4 games during a weeks trip.

| 27 July 1985 Friendly | GIF Sundsvall (Sweden) | 1-3 | (Scotland) Celtic | Sundsvall, Sweden |
| | | Report | McClair 28', McInally 63' 75' | Stadium: Idrottsparken (Sundsvall); Attendance: 3,500 |

| 31 July 1985 Friendly | Älgarna-Härnösand IF (Sweden) | 0-11 | (Scotland) Celtic | Härnösand, Sweden |
| | | Report | | Stadium: Ängevallen |

| 3 August 1985 Friendly | Sollefteå GIF (Sweden) | 1–1 | (Scotland) Celtic | Sollefteå, Sweden |
| | | Report | | Stadium: Nipvallen |

| 5 August 1985 Friendly | Örnsköldsvik (Sweden) | 0-1 | (Scotland) Celtic | Örnsköldsvik, Sweden |
| | McClair 24' | Report | McLeod 85' |

== Competitions ==
=== Scottish Premier Division ===
==== League table ====
| Pos | Team | Pld | W | D | L | GF | GA | GD | Pts | Qualification |
|---|---|---|---|---|---|---|---|---|---|---|
| 1 | Celtic (C) | 36 | 20 | 10 | 6 | 67 | 38 | +29 | 50 | Qualification for the European Cup first round |
| 2 | Heart of Midlothian | 36 | 20 | 10 | 6 | 59 | 33 | +26 | 50 | Qualification for the UEFA Cup first round |
| 3 | Dundee United | 36 | 18 | 11 | 7 | 59 | 31 | +28 | 47 | Qualification for the UEFA Cup first round |
| 4 | Aberdeen | 36 | 16 | 12 | 8 | 62 | 31 | +31 | 44 | Qualification for the Cup Winners' Cup first round |
| 5 | Rangers | 36 | 13 | 9 | 14 | 53 | 45 | +8 | 35 | Qualification for the UEFA Cup first round |

Source: Rsssf
Rules for classification: 1) points; 2) goal difference; 3) number of goals scored.
(C) Champions

==== Matches ====
| 10 August 1985 Premier League | Hearts | 1–1 | Celtic | Edinburgh |
| 15:00 | Colquhoun 28' | Report | McStay 90' | Stadium: Tynecastle Park; Attendance: 21,786; Referee: H. Alexander (Kilmarnock) |

| 17 August 1985 Premier League | Celtic | 2–1 | Motherwell | Glasgow |
| 15:00 | McClair 50', Provan 77' | Report | Blair 88' | Stadium: Celtic Park; Attendance: 20,189; Referee: J. Renton (Cowdenbeath) |

| 24 August 1985 Premier League | Clydebank | 0–2 | Celtic | Clydebank |
| 15:00 | | Report | Johnston 25' 63', | Stadium: Kilbowie Park; Attendance: 9,633; Referee: A.N Huett (Edinburgh) |

| 31 August 1985 Premier League | Celtic | 1–1 | Rangers | Glasgow |
| 15:00 | McStay 52' | Report | McCoist 34' | Stadium: Celtic Park; Attendance: 55,365; Referee: R.B. Valentine (Dundee) |

| 7 September 1985 Premier League | Hibernian | 0–5 | Celtic | Edinburgh |
| 15:00 GMT | | Report | McClair 10' 89', Johnston 17', Fulton (o.g.), Archdeacon 79' | Stadium: Easter Road; Attendance: 13,366; Referee: A. Ferguson (Giffnock) |

| 14 September 1985 Premier League | Celtic | 2–1 | Aberdeen | Glasgow |
| 15:00 GMT | McClair 32' 89' | Report | McDougall 85' | Stadium: Celtic Park; Attendance: 39,450; Referee: D. Syme (Rutherglen) |

| 28 September 1985 Premier League | Dundee | 0–2 | Celtic | Dundee |
| 15:00 GMT | | Report | McClair 31', Johnston 44' | Stadium: Dens Park; Attendance: 15,387; Referee: D. Hope (Erskine) |

| 5 October 1985 Premier League | Celtic | 2–0 | St Mirren | Glasgow |
| 15:00 GMT | McClair 25', McGugan 39' | Report | | Stadium: Celtic Park; Attendance: 25,651; Referee: W. Crombie (Edinburgh) |

| 12 October 1985 Premier League | Celtic | 0–1 | Hearts | Glasgow |
| 15:00 GMT | | Report | Robertson 33' | Stadium: Celtic Park; Attendance: 26,683; Referee: J. Duncan (Gorebridge) |

| 19 October 1985 Premier League | Motherwell | 1–2 | Celtic | Motherwell |
| 15:00 GMT | Walker 44' | Report | McStay 10' 88' | Stadium: Fir Park; Attendance: 19,258; Referee: I. Cathcart (Bridge of Allan) |

| 26 October 1985 Premier League | Celtic | 0–3 | Dundee United | Glasgow |
| 15:00 GMT | | Report | Dodds 6', Bannon 42' 68' | Stadium: Celtic Park; Attendance: 25,976; Referee: A. Waddell (Edinburgh) |

| 2 November 1985 Premier League | Aberdeen | 4–1 | Celtic | Aberdeen |
| 15:00 GMT | McDougall 27' 48' 55' 64' | Report | Provan 43' | Stadium: Pittodrie Stadium; Attendance: 22,097; Referee: B. McGinlay (Balfron) |

| 9 November 1985 Premier League | Rangers | 3–0 | Celtic | Glasgow |
| 15:00 GMT | Durrant 30', Cooper 80', McMinn 84' | Report | | Stadium: Ibrox Stadium; Attendance: 41,670; Referee: D. Syme (Rutherglen) |

| 16 November 1985 Premier League | Celtic | 2–0 | Clydebank | Glasgow |
| 15:00 GMT | McGhee 37' 85' | Report | | Stadium: Celtic Park; Attendance: 14,148; Referee: T. McVicar (Carluke) |

| 23 November 1985 Premier League | Celtic | 1–1 | Hibernian | Glasgow |
| 15:00 GMT | Johnston 13' | Report | Chisholm 76' | Stadium: Celtic Park; Attendance: 21,510; Referee: J. Renton (Cowdenbeath) |

| 14 December 1985 Premier League | Hearts | 1–1 | Celtic | Edinburgh |
| 15:00 GMT | Robertson 9' | Report | McGhee 67' | Stadium: Tynecastle Park; Attendance: 22,163; Referee: D. Syme (Rutherglen) |

| 23 December 1985 Premier League | Dundee United | 1–0 | Celtic | Dundee |
| 19:30 GMT | Bannoni 43' | Report | | Stadium: Tannadice Park; Attendance: 15,894; Referee: B. Crombie (Edinburgh) |

| 28 December 1985 Premier League | Celtic | 2–0 | Clydebank | Glasgow |
| 15:00 GMT | Johnston 11', McStay 49' | Report | | Stadium: Celtic Park; Attendance: 13,822; Referee: R.B Valentine (Dundee) |

| 1 January 1986 Premier League | Celtic | 2–0 | Rangers | Glasgow |
| 15:00 GMT | McGugan 9', McClair 49' | Report | | Stadium: Celtic Park; Attendance: 49,812; Referee: B. McGinlay (Balfron) |

| 4 January 1986 Premier League | Dundee United | 4–2 | Celtic | Dundee |
| 15:00 GMT | Dodds 14' 17', Bannon 32', Gallacher 34' | Report | [Brian McClair|McClair]] 19' 87' | Stadium: Tannadice Park; Attendance: 16,668; Referee: J. McCluskey (Stewarton) |

| 11 January 1986 Premier League | Celtic | 1–1 | Aberdeen | Glasgow |
| 15:00 GMT | Grant 19' | Report | Miller 14' | Stadium: Celtic Park; Attendance: 31,305; Referee: J. Duncan (Gorebridge) |

| 15 January 1986 Premier League | Celtic | 3–2 | Motherwell | Glasgow |
| 19:30 GMT | McGhee 32', Johnston 49', McClair 86' | Report | Reilly 12', Doyle 89' | Stadium: Celtic Park; Attendance: 11,402 |

| 18 January 1986 Premier League | Hibernian | 2–2 | Celtic | Edinburgh |
| 15:00 GMT | | | | Stadium: Easter Road; Attendance: 13,512 |

| 1 February 1986 Premier League | Dundee | 1–3 | Celtic | Dundee |
| 15:00 GMT | Stephen 9' | Report | Johnston 44', McStay 60', McClair 83' | Stadium: Dens Park; Attendance: 12,295; Referee: C. Sinclair (Forfar) |

| 8 February 1986 Premier League | Celtic | 1–1 | St Mirren | Glasgow |
| 15:00 GMT | Burns 48' | Report | Clarke 75' | Stadium: Celtic Park; Attendance: 17,602; Referee: M. Delaney (Clelland) |

| 22 February 1986 Premier League | Celtic | 1–1 | Hearts | Glasgow |
| 15:00 GMT | Johnston 31' | Report | Robertson 45' | Stadium: Celtic Park; Attendance: 42,346; Referee: A. Ferguson (Giffnock) |

| 15 March 1986 Premier League | Celtic | 1–1 | Dundee United | Glasgow |
| 15:00 GMT | MacLeod 82' | Report | Dodds 38' | Stadium: Celtic Park; Attendance: 20,965; Referee: G. Smith (Edinburgh) |

| 22 March 1986 Premier League | Rangers | 4–4 | Celtic | Glasgow |
| 15:00 GMT | Fraser 34', McCoist 52', Fleck 52', Fraser 63' | Report | Johnston 21', McClair 29', Burns 47', MacLeod 70' | Stadium: Ibrox Stadium; Attendance: 41,010; Referee: D. Syme (Rutherglen) |

| 29 March 1986 Premier League | Clydebank | 0–5 | Celtic | Clydebank |
| 15:00 GMT | | Report | McClair 49' (pen.) 54' (pen.) 67', Burns 58', McInally 80' | Stadium: Kilbowie Park; Attendance: 8,056; Referee: B. McGinaly (Balfron) |

| 2 April 1986 Premier League | Celtic | 2–1 | Dundee | Glasgow |
| 19:30 GMT | Johnston 18', Burns 46' | Report | Stephen 86' | Stadium: Celtic Park; Attendance: 11,310; Referee: D. Hope (Erskine) |

| 5 April 1986 Premier League | St Mirren | 1–2 | Celtic | Paisley |
| 15:00 GMT | Mackie 56' | Report | MacLeod 26', McStay 87' | Stadium: St Mirren Park, Love Street; Attendance: 10,919; Referee: D. Syme (Rutherglen) |

| 12 April 1986 Premier League | Aberdeen | 0–1 | Celtic | Aberdeen |
| 15:00 GMT | | Report | Johnston 49' | Stadium: Pittodrie Stadium; Attendance: 21,613; Referee: W. Crombie (Edinburgh) |

| 19 April 1986 Premier League | Celtic | 2–0 | Hibernian | Glasgow |
| 15:00 GMT | Archdeacon 80', McClair 88' | Report | | Stadium: Celtic Park; Attendance: 14,966; Referee: D.T. McVicar (Carluke) |

| 26 April 1986 Premier League | Celtic | 2–0 | Dundee | Glasgow |
| 15:00 GMT | McClair 56', Johnston 85' | Report | | Stadium: Celtic Park; Attendance: 13,521; Referee: D. Hope (Erskine) |

| 30 April 1986 Premier League | Motherwell | 0–2 | Celtic | Motherwell |
| 19:30 GMT | | Report | McClair 35' 63' | Stadium: Fir Park; Attendance: 10,540; Referee: A. McCluskey (Stewarton) |

| 3 May 1986 Premier League | St Mirren | 0–5 | Celtic | Paisley |
| 15:00 GMT | | Report | McClair 6' 54', Johnston 32' 33', McStay 38' | Stadium: St Mirren Park, Love Street; Attendance: 17,833; Referee: A. Waddell (Edinburgh) |

=== Scottish Cup ===
| 25 January 1986 Third round | Celtic | 2–0 | St Johnstone | Glasgow |
| 15:00 GMT | | | | Stadium: Celtic Park; Attendance: 15,006 |

| 15 February 1986 Fourth round | Celtic | 2–1 | Queen's Park | Glasgow |
| 15:00 GMT | | | | Stadium: Celtic Park; Attendance: 11,656 |

| 8 March 1986 Fifth round | Hibernian | 4–3 | Celtic | Edinburgh |
| 15:00 GMT | | | | Stadium: Easter Road; Attendance: 20,000 |

=== Scottish League Cup ===
| 21 August 1985 Second round | Queen of the South | 1–4 | Celtic | Dumfries |
| 19:30 GMT | | Report | McClair 10', Johnston 46' 53', McInally 86' | Stadium: Palmerston Park; Attendance: 6,404; Referee: B. McGinlay (Balfron) |

| 28 August 1985 Third round | Celtic | 7–0 | Brechin City | Glasgow |
| 19:30 GMT | Aitken 8', Johnston 21' 62', McStay 40', McInally 53', Provan 60', Burns 70' | Report | | Stadium: Celtic Park; Attendance: 9,292; Referee: T. Muirhead (Stenhousemuir) |

| 4 September 1985 Quarter Finals | Hibernian | 4–4 (a.e.t.) (4-3 p) | Celtic | Edinburgh |
| 19:30 GMT | Cowan 30', Durie 39' 101', Harris 58' | Report | Johnston 3' 59', Provan 40', Aitken 100' | Stadium: Easter Road; Attendance: 15,570; Referee: T. Muirhead (Stenhousemuir) |

=== European Cup Winners' Cup ===
| 18 September 1985 1st round 1st leg | Atletico Madrid (Spain) | 1–1 | (Scotland) Celtic | Madrid |
| 20:00 GMT | Setién 34' | Report | Johnston 69' | Stadium: Estadio Vicente Calderón; Attendance: 55,000; Referee: Bolker Roth (East Germany) |

| 2 October 1985 1st round 2nd leg | Celtic (Scotland) | 1–2 (2–3 agg.) | (Spain) Atletico Madrid | Glasgow |
| 14:00 GMT | Aitken 73' | Report | Setién 38', Quique 73' | Stadium: Celtic Park; Attendance: 182 (Behind closed doors); Referee: Paolo Casarin (Italy) |

=== Glasgow Cup ===
| 19 November 1985 Semi-final | Partick Thistle | 2–3 | Celtic | Maryhill, Glasgow |
| 19:30 GMT | | | | Stadium: Firhill; Attendance: 3,798 |

| 9 May 1986 Final | Rangers | 3–2 | Celtic | Glasgow |
| 19:30 GMT | | | | Stadium: Ibrox Park; Attendance: 40,741 |

== Statistics ==
=== Appearances and goals ===
| Pos. | | Name | League | | Scottish Cup | | League Cup | | European Cup Winners Cup | | Other | | Total | |
| Pos. | | Name | Apps | Goals | Apps | Goals | Apps | Goals | Apps | Goals | Apps | Goals | Apps | Goals |
|---|---|---|---|---|---|---|---|---|---|---|---|---|---|---|
| GK | (Republic of Ireland) | Pat Bonner | 30 | 0 | 0 | 0 | 3 | 0 | 2 | 0 | 0 | 0 | 35 | 0 |
| GK | (England) | Peter Latchford | 6 | 0 | 3 | 0 | 0 | 0 | 0 | 0 | 0 | 0 | 9 | 0 |
| DF | (Scotland) | Roy Aitken | 36 | 0 | 3 | 1 | 5 | 2 | 4 | 1 | 0 | 0 | 44 | 4 |
| DF | (Republic of Ireland) | Pierce O'Leary | 12 | 0 | 1 | 0 | 1 | 0 | 0 | 0 | 0 | 0 | 14 | 0 |
| DF | (Scotland) | Danny McGrain | 27 | 0 | 2 | 0 | 2 | 0 | 2 | 0 | 0 | 0 | 33 | 0 |
| DF | (Scotland) | Paul McGugan | 19 | 2 | 1 | 0 | 0 | 0 | 2 | 0 | 0 | 0 | 22 | 0 |
| DF | (Scotland) | Willie McStay | 14 | 0 | 1 | 0 | 1 | 0 | 0 | 0 | 0 | 0 | 16 | 0 |
| DF | (Scotland) | Ronnie Coyle | 1 | 0 | 0 | 0 | 0 | 0 | 0 | 0 | 0 | 0 | 1 | 0 |
| DF | (Scotland) | Derek Whyte | 11 | 0 | 0 | 0 | 0 | 0 | 0 | 0 | 0 | 0 | 11 | 0 |
| MF | (Scotland) | Tommy Burns | 34 | 5 | 3 | 0 | 3 | 1 | 2 | 0 | 0 | 0 | 42 | 6 |
| MF | (Scotland) | Peter Grant | 26 | 1 | 2 | 1 | 3 | 0 | 2 | 0 | 0 | 0 | 33 | 2 |
| MF | (Scotland) | Paul McStay | 34 | 8 | 2 | 0 | 2 | 1 | 2 | 0 | 0 | 0 | 56 | 9 |
| MF | (Scotland) | Murdo MacLeod | 29 | 3 | 2 | 0 | 3 | 0 | 2 | 0 | 0 | 0 | 50 | 3 |
| MF | (Scotland) | Tony Shepherd | 0 | 0 | 1 | 0 | 0 | 0 | 0 | 0 | 0 | 0 | 1 | 0 |
| DF | (Scotland) | Tom McAdam | 5 | 0 | 1 | 0 | 2 | 0 | 0 | 0 | 0 | 0 | 8 | 0 |
| MF | (Scotland) | Owen Archdeacon | 19 | 0 | 3 | 0 | 0 | 0 | 0 | 0 | 0 | 0 | 22 | 0 |
| FW | (Scotland) | Brian McClair | 33 | 22 | 2 | 3 | 3 | 1 | 2 | 0 | 0 | 0 | 40 | 26 |
| FW | (Scotland) | Mo Johnston | 31 | 15 | 3 | 1 | 3 | 6 | 2 | 1 | 0 | 0 | 39 | 23 |
| FW | (Scotland) | Mark McGhee | 13 | 4 | 3 | 1 | 0 | 0 | 0 | 0 | 0 | 0 | 16 | 5 |
| FW | (Scotland) | Alan McInally | 5 | 1 | 0 | 0 | 1 | 2 | 0 | 0 | 0 | 0 | 6 | 3 |

=== Goalscorers ===
| R | Pos. | Nation | Name | Premier Division | Scottish Cup | League Cup | European Cup Winners Cup | Total |
|---|---|---|---|---|---|---|---|---|
| 1 | FW | (Scotland) | Brian McClair | 22 | 3 | 1 | 0 | 26 |
| 2 | FW | (Scotland) | Mo Johnston | 15 | 1 | 6 | 1 | 23 |
| 3 | MF | (Scotland) | Paul McStay | 8 | 0 | 1 | 0 | 9 |
| 4 | MF | (Scotland) | Tommy Burns | 5 | 0 | 1 | 0 | 6 |
| 5 | FW | (Scotland) | Mark McGhee | 4 | 1 | 0 | 0 | 5 |
| 6 | MF | (Scotland) | Roy Aitken | 0 | 1 | 2 | 1 | 4 |
| 6 | FW | (Scotland) | Davie Provan | 2 | 0 | 2 | 0 | 4 |
| 7 | FW | (Scotland) | Owen Archdeacon | 3 | 0 | 0 | 0 | 3 |
| 7 | FW | (Scotland) | Alan McInally | 1 | 0 | 2 | 0 | 3 |
| 7 | MF | (Scotland) | Murdo MacLeod | 3 | 0 | 0 | 0 | 3 |
| 8 | MF | (Scotland) | Peter Grant | 1 | 1 | 0 | 0 | 2 |
| 8 | DF | (Scotland) | Paul McGugan | 2 | 0 | 0 | 0 | 2 |
| Total | | | | 67 | 7 | 15 | 2 | 91 |

== Club Staff ==
Board of Directors
| Position | Name |
|---|---|
| Chairman | Thomas L. Devlin |
| Vice-chairman | John C. McGinn |
| Secretary | Christopher D. White |
| Directors | James M. Farrell Thomas J. Grant Kevin Kelly Christopher D. White |

Football Staff
| Position | Name |
|---|---|
| Manager | David Hay |
| Assistant manager | Frank Connor (until 2 February 1986) |
| Coach | Bobby Lennox |
| Physio | Brian Scott |
| Masseur | Jimmy Steele |
| Kitman | Neil Mochan |
| Chief Scout | John Kelman |

== Transfers ==
=== In ===
| Pos | Player | From | Type | Date | Fee |
|---|---|---|---|---|---|
| FW | (Scotland) Mark McGhee | (Germany) Hamburger SV | Transfer | November 1985 | £150,000 |
| | | | TOTAL | | £150,000 |

=== Out ===
| Pos | Player | From | Type | Date | Fee |
|---|---|---|---|---|---|
| FW | (Scotland) John Colquhoun | (Scotland) Heart of Midlothian | Transfer | May 1985 | £60,000 |
| DF | (Scotland) Graeme Sinclair | (Scotland) St Mirren | Transfer | May 1985 | Free Transfer |
| FW | (Scotland) Willie McStay | (Scotland) St Mirren | Transfer | June 1985 | £80,000 |
| DF | (Scotland) Tom McAdam | (Scotland) Motherwell | Transfer | February 1986 | Free Transfer |
| | | | TOTAL | | £140,000 |
