= Derek Whyte =

Scottish footballer

Personal information
- Full name: Derek Whyte
- Date of birth: 31 August 1968 (age 58)
- Place of birth: Glasgow, Scotland
- Height: 1.83 m (6 ft 0 in)
- Position: Defender

Senior career*
Years	Team	Apps	(Gls)
1985–1992	Celtic	216	(7)
1992–1997	Middlesbrough	159	(2)
1997–2002	Aberdeen	134	(0)
2002–2004	Partick Thistle	40	(0)
Total		549	(9)

International career
1986–1989	Scotland U21	9	(0)
1990–1996	Scotland B	4	(0)
1987–1999	Scotland	12	(0)

Managerial career
- 2003–2004: Partick Thistle (joint manager)
- * Club domestic league appearances and goals

Derek Whyte (born 31 August 1968) is a Scottish former footballer, who played for Celtic, Middlesbrough, Aberdeen and Partick Thistle. He also won twelve caps for Scotland during his 18-year playing career. He participated at Euro 1992, Euro 1996 and the 1998 FIFA World Cup.

Whyte joined Celtic on 14 May 1985 as a 16-year-old from the Celtic Boys Club. A defender with the greatest of promise, described as the new Billy McNeill, his form slumped towards the end of his time at the club. He left at the end of the 1991–92 season when an agreeable new contract was not forthcoming. He was sold to Middlesbrough for £900,000 where he returned to the early good form he had shown at Celtic.

After 5 seasons on Teesside, Whyte left Middlesbrough to return to Scotland, joining Aberdeen for an undisclosed fee and a four-and-a-half-year contract in December 1997. He was appointed team captain at Pittodrie and remained there until 2002, when he joined Partick Thistle on a free transfer.

Along with Gerry Britton, Whyte was appointed joint player-manager of the Jags after Gerry Collins was sacked in November 2003. In March 2004 he decided to hang up his playing boots to concentrate on management. Whyte and Britton were sacked by Thistle in December 2004. Soon afterwards he moved to the United Arab Emirates. He is now a pundit on ShowSports, the sports channel on the Showtime Arabia network, based in Dubai, and writes a weekly column for the UAE's leading daily newspaper 7DAYS.

== Career statistics ==
=== Club ===
Appearances and goals by club, season and competition
Club	Season	League			National Cup		League Cup		Europe		Total	
Club	Season	Division	Apps	Goals	Apps	Goals	Apps	Goals	Apps	Goals	Apps	Goals
Celtic	1985–86	Scottish Premier Division	11	0	0	0	0	0	0	0	11	0
Celtic	1986–87	Scottish Premier Division	42	0	4	0	5	0	3	0	54	0
Celtic	1987–88	Scottish Premier Division	41	3	5	0	2	0	2	1	50	4
Celtic	1988–89	Scottish Premier Division	22	0	2	0	3	0	4	0	31	0
Celtic	1989–90	Scottish Premier Division	35	1	6	0	3	0	2	0	46	1
Celtic	1990–91	Scottish Premier Division	24	2	5	0	4	0	0	0	33	2
Celtic	1991–92	Scottish Premier Division	40	1	4	0	3	0	4	0	51	1
Celtic	1992–93	Scottish Premier Division	1	0	0	0	0	0	0	0	1	0
Celtic	Total		216	7	26	0	20	0	15	1	277	8
Middlesbrough	1992–93	Premier League	35	0	0	0	2	0	0	0	37	0
Middlesbrough	1993–94	First Division	42	1	1	0	3	0	-	-	46	1
Middlesbrough	1994–95	First Division	36	1	1	0	3	0	-	-	40	1
Middlesbrough	1995–96	Premier League	25	0	0	0	3	0	0	0	28	0
Middlesbrough	1996–97	Premier League	21	0	4	0	4	1	0	0	29	1
Middlesbrough	1997–98	First Division	0	0	0	0	1	0	-	-	1	0
Middlesbrough	Total		159	2	6	0	16	1	0	0	181	3
Aberdeen	1997–98	Scottish Premier Division	19	0	1	0	0	0	0	0	20	0
Aberdeen	1998–99	SPL	35	0	1	0	2	0	0	0	38	0
Aberdeen	1999–00	SPL	20	0	5	0	3	0	0	0	28	0
Aberdeen	2000–01	SPL	29	0	2	0	1	0	1	0	33	0
Aberdeen	2001–02	SPL	31	0	3	0	2	0	0	0	36	0
Aberdeen	Total		134	0	12	0	8	0	1	0	155	0
Partick Thistle	2002–03	SPL	25	0	0	0	3	0	0	0	31	0
Partick Thistle	2003–04	SPL	15	0	0	0	2	0	0	0	17	0
Partick Thistle	Total		40	0	0	0	5	0	0	0	45	0
Career total			549	9	44	0	49	1	16	1	658	11

=== International ===
Appearances and goals by national team and year
National team	Year	Apps	Goals
Scotland	1987	2	0
Scotland	1988	—	
Scotland	1989	1	0
Scotland	1990	—	
Scotland	1991	—	
Scotland	1992	3	0
Scotland	1993	—	
Scotland	1994	—	
Scotland	1995	2	0
Scotland	1996	2	0
Scotland	1997	—	
Scotland	1998	1	0
Scotland	1999	1	0
Total		12	0

=== Managerial record ===
Team	From	To	Record				
Team	From	To	P	W	L	D	Win %
Partick Thistle	30 November 2003	20 December 2004	52	16	26	10	30.77%

== Honours ==
Middlesbrough

- Football League First Division: 1994–95
