= 1984–85 Clydebank F.C. season =

Clydebank F.C.
1984–85 season
- Manager: Sammy Henderson
- Scottish League Division One: 2nd
- Scottish Cup: 3rd Round
- Scottish League Cup: 2nd Round

The 1984–85 season was Clydebank's nineteenth season after being elected to the Scottish Football League. They competed in Scottish League Division One where they finished 2nd. They also competed in the Scottish League Cup and Scottish Cup.

== Results ==
=== Division 1 ===
Match Day	Date	Opponent	H/A	Score	Clydebank Scorer(s)	Attendance
1	11 August	St Johnstone	H	3–0		
2	18 August	Airdrieonians	A	0–1		
3	25 August	Falkirk	A	2–0		
4	8 September	Clyde	A	0–2		
5	15 September	Kilmarnock	H	5–0		
6	22 September	Motherwell	A	1–0		
7	29 September	East Fife	A	4–4		
8	1 October	Hamilton Academical	H	0–0		
9	6 October	Ayr United	H	2–1		
10	13 October	Forfar Athletic	A	0–0		
11	20 October	Partick Thistle	H	1–0		
12	27 October	Meadowbank Thistle	H	1–0		
13	3 November	Brechin City	A	2–2		
14	10 November	Clyde	H	1–2		
15	17 November	Kilmarnock	A	1–1		
16	24 November	Motherwell	H	2–1		
17	1 December	East Fife	H	1–0		
18	8 December	Ayr United	A	4–4		
19	15 December	Hamilton Academical	A	1–0		
20	22 December	Falkirk	H	1–3		
21	1 January	Airdireonians	H	1–0		
22	19 January	Meadowbank Thistle	A	3–1		
23	2 February	Brechin City	H	0–2		
24	16 February	St Johnstone	A	1–1		
25	20 February	Partick Thistle	A	1–0		
26	23 February	Hamilton Academical	H	1–1		
27	26 February	Kilmarnock	A	0–0		
28	2 March	Clyde	H	2–0		
29	5 March	Forfar Athletic	H	1–1		
30	9 March	Falkirk	A	0–0		
31	16 March	Motherwell	A	0–1		
32	23 March	Partick Thistle	H	1–2		
33	3 April	Airdrieonians	H	1–1		
34	9 April	Meadowbank Thistle	A	3–0		
35	13 April	Brechin City	H	5–1		
36	20 April	Forfar Athletic	A	1–1		
37	27 April	Ayr United	A	2–3		
38	4 May	St Johnstone	H	2–1		
39	11 May	East Fife	A	0–0		

==== Final League table ====
Pos	Team	Pld	W	D	L	GF	GA	GD	Pts	Promotion or relegation
1	Motherwell (C, P)	39	21	8	10	62	26	+36	50	Promotion to the Premier Division
2	Clydebank (P)	39	17	14	8	57	37	+20	48	Promotion to the Premier Division
3	Falkirk	39	19	7	13	65	54	+11	45	
4	Hamilton Academical	39	16	11	12	48	49	−1	43	
5	Airdrieonians	39	17	8	14	70	59	+11	42	

Source: RSSSF and statto
Rules for classification: 1) points; 2) goal difference; 3) number of goals scored.
(C) Champions; (P) Promoted

=== Scottish League Cup ===
Round	Date	Opponent	H/A	Score	Clydebank Scorer(s)	Attendance
R2	21 August	Raith Rovers	A	0–2		

=== Scottish Cup ===
Round	Date	Opponent	H/A	Score	Clydebank Scorer(s)	Attendance
R3	4 February	Forfar Athletic	A	0–1		
