= 1993–94 Middlesbrough F.C. season =

Middlesbrough
1993–94 season
- Chairman: Colin Henderson
- Manager: Lennie Lawrence
- Stadium: Ayresome Park
- First Division: 9th
- FA Cup: Third round
- League Cup: Third round
- Top goalscorer: Wilkinson (19), Hendrie (17)
- Average home league attendance: 10,400

During the 1993–94 English football season, Middlesbrough F.C. competed in the Football League First Division.

== Season summary ==
In the 1993–94 season, Middlesbrough started promisingly with 6 wins from their first 12 league games and by near the end of October where in 3rd place but a poor run of just 1 win in their next 11 league games, saw Middlesbrough slide down to 13th and end their hopes of automatic promotion which saw them finish in a disappointing 9th place and on 2 May 1994, Lawrence confirmed his departure at the end of the season. Upon leaving he helped young chairman Steve Gibson contact his replacement Bryan Robson.

Also at the end of the season, Henderson was succeeded as chairman of the club by lifelong fan Steve Gibson, who helped save Middlesbrough from liquidation in 1986 by forming a consortium and seven years later bought Scottish & Newcastle's shares in the club as well as now owning roughly 90% of the club.

== Final league table ==
Pos	Team	Pld	W	D	L	GF	GA	GD	Pts
7	Notts County	46	20	8	18	65	69	−4	68
8	Wolverhampton Wanderers	46	17	17	12	60	47	+13	68
9	Middlesbrough	46	18	13	15	66	54	+12	67
10	Stoke City	46	18	13	15	57	59	−2	67
11	Charlton Athletic	46	19	8	19	61	58	+3	65

Source: rsssf.com
Rules for classification: 1) Points; 2) Goals scored; 3) Goal difference

== Results ==
Middlesbrough's score comes first

=== Legend ===
Win	Draw	Loss

=== Football League First Division ===
Date	Opponent	Venue	Result	Attendance	Scorers
14 August 1993	Notts County	A	3–2	9,392	Wilkinson, Moore (2)
21 August 1993	Derby County	H	3–0	15,168	Kernaghan, Short (own goal), Hendrie
24 August 1993	Barnsley	A	4–1	10,597	Moore (2), Hendrie (2)
28 August 1993	Wolverhampton Wanderers	A	3–2	21,061	Hendrie (2), Pollock
11 September 1993	Southend United	A	0–1	6,495	
14 September 1993	Stoke City	H	1–2	13,189	Hignett
18 September 1993	Luton Town	H	0–0	12,487	
25 September 1993	West Bromwich Albion	A	1–1	15,766	Whyte
29 September 1993	Leicester City	H	2–0	11,871	Wilkinson, Hendrie
2 October 1993	Birmingham City	H	2–2	13,801	Hendrie, Moore
10 October 1993	Watford	A	0–2	7,582	
17 October 1993	Sunderland	H	4–1	12,772	Hignett, Hendrie, Wilkinson (2)
24 October 1993	Millwall	A	1–1	6,686	Barber (own goal)
30 October 1993	Peterborough United	H	1–1	10,704	Mustoe
2 November 1993	Portsmouth	A	0–2	12,503	
6 November 1993	Bristol City	H	0–1	9,687	
21 November 1993	Bolton Wanderers	H	0–1	6,828	
4 December 1993	Bristol City	A	0–0	8,441	
11 December 1993	Stoke City	A	1–3	13,777	Peake
18 December 1993	Notts County	H	3–0	7,869	Moore, Kavanagh (2)
27 December 1993	Nottingham Forest	A	1–1	26,901	Moore
29 December 1993	Tranmere Rovers	H	0–0	12,351	
1 January 1994	Oxford United	A	1–1	5,763	Pollock
3 January 1994	Grimsby Town	H	1–0	10,441	Wilkinson
16 January 1994	Sunderland	A	1–2	16,473	Vickers
22 January 1994	Watford	H	1–1	8,089	Moore
6 February 1994	Millwall	H	4–2	6,286	Hignett (2), Vickers, Wilkinson
12 February 1994	Peterborough United	A	0–1	7,020	
22 February 1994	Derby County	A	1–0	14,716	Vickers
5 March 1994	Wolverhampton Wanderers	H	1–0	12,092	Wilkinson
8 March 1994	Luton Town	A	1–1	6,741	Mustoe
12 March 1994	Leicester City	A	0–2	16,116	
15 March 1994	Southend United	H	1–0	7,378	Wilkinson
19 March 1994	West Bromwich Albion	H	3–0	10,516	Wilkinson, Pollock, Hendrie
23 March 1994	Crystal Palace	A	1–0	12,811	Hignett
26 March 1994	Birmingham City	A	0–1	12,409	
29 March 1994	Grimsby Town	A	1–1	5,709	Pollock
2 April 1994	Nottingham Forest	H	2–2	17,056	Pollock (2)
4 April 1994	Tranmere Rovers	A	0–4	8,225	
9 April 1994	Oxford United	H	2–1	8,586	Moore, Wilkinson
16 April 1994	Portsmouth	H	0–2	10,041	
19 April 1994	Charlton Athletic	H	2–0	6,982	Moore, Hendrie
23 April 1994	Bolton Wanderers	A	1–4	9,220	Wilkinson
26 April 1994	Barnsley	H	5–0	6,368	Taggart (own goal), Pollock (2), Wilkinson (2, 1 pen)
1 May 1994	Crystal Palace	H	2–3	8,638	Liburd, Wilkinson
8 May 1994	Charlton Athletic	A	5–2	8,905	Wilkinson, Hendrie (3), Pollock

=== FA Cup ===
Round	Date	Opponent	Venue	Result	Attendance	Goalscorers
R3	8 January 1994	Cardiff City	A	2–2	13,750	Wilkinson, Moore
R3R	19 January 1994	Cardiff City	H	1–2	10,769	Kavanagh

=== League Cup ===
Round	Date	Opponent	Venue	Result	Attendance	Goalscorers
R2 1st leg	21 September 1993	Brighton & Hove Albion	H	5–0	5,651	Hignett (4), Hendrie
R2 2nd leg	6 October 1993	Brighton & Hove Albion	A	3–1 (won 8–1 on agg)	2,074	Wilkinson, Hignett
R3	27 October 1993	Sheffield Wednesday	H	1–1	14,765	Hendrie
R3R	10 November 1993	Sheffield Wednesday	A	1–2	19,482	Mustoe

=== Anglo-Italian Cup ===
Round	Date	Opponent	Venue	Result	Attendance	Goalscorers
PR Group 2	31 August 1993	Grimsby Town	A	1–2	996	Hendrie
PR Group 2	7 September 1993	Barnsley	H	3–0	5,173	Hendrie, Wilkinson (2, 1 pen)
Group A	12 October 1993	Pisa	A	1–3	500	Mustoe
Group A	16 November 1993	Ancona	H	0–0	2,985	
Group A	24 November 1993	Ascoli	A	0–3	1,200	
Group A	22 December 1993	Brescia	H	0–1	1,633	

== Squad ==
Note: Flags indicate national team as defined under FIFA eligibility rules; some limited exceptions apply. Players may hold more than one non-FIFA nationality.

No.	Pos.	Nation	Player
1	GK	(England) ENG	Stephen Pears
15	DF	(Republic of Ireland) IRL	Curtis Fleming
3	DF	(England) ENG	Richard Liburd
5	DF	(England) ENG	Nicky Mohan
26	DF	(England) ENG	Steve Vickers
6	DF	(Scotland) SCO	Derek Whyte
17	MF	(Republic of Ireland) IRL	Alan Moore
14	MF	(England) ENG	Robbie Mustoe
4	MF	(England) ENG	Jamie Pollock
10	MF	(England) ENG	Andy Peake
9	FW	(England) ENG	Paul Wilkinson
7	FW	(Scotland) SCO	John Hendrie
8	FW	(England) ENG	Craig Hignett
2	DF	(Republic of Ireland) IRL	Chris Morris
21	MF	(England) ENG	Phil Stamp
16	GK	(England) ENG	Andy Collett

No.	Pos.	Nation	Player
11	MF	(Scotland) SCO	Tommy Wright
18	MF	(Republic of Ireland) IRL	Graham Kavanagh
-	MF	(England) ENG	John Gannon (on loan from Sheffield United)
5	DF	(Republic of Ireland) IRL	Alan Kernaghan
20	DF	(England) ENG	Andy Todd
19	DF	(England) ENG	Michael Barron
22	FW	(England) ENG	Ian Johnson
-	DF	(Scotland) SCO	David Winnie
-	GK	(England) ENG	Ben Roberts
-	DF	(England) ENG	Anthony Barness (on loan from Chelsea)
12	FW	(England) ENG	Neil Illman
21	DF	(England) ENG	Mark Taylor
24	MF	(England) ENG	Michael Oliver
25	FW	(Scotland) SCO	Paul Forrester
