= Mark McGhee =

Scottish footballer (born 1957)

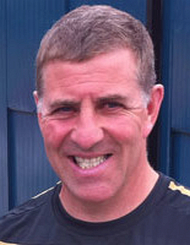

Personal information
- Full name: Mark Edward McGhee
- Date of birth: 25 May 1957 (age 69)
- Place of birth: Glasgow, Scotland
- Height: 1.78 m (5 ft 10 in)
- Position: Striker

Senior career*
Years	Team	Apps	(Gls)
1975–1977	Morton	64	(37)
1977–1979	Newcastle United	28	(5)
1979–1984	Aberdeen	164	(61)
1984–1985	Hamburger SV	30	(7)
1985–1989	Celtic	87	(27)
1989–1991	Newcastle United	67	(24)
1991	IK Brage	3	(2)
1991–1993	Reading	45	(7)
Total		488	(170)

International career
1983–1984	Scotland	4	(2)

Managerial career
- 1991–1994: Reading
- 1994–1995: Leicester City
- 1995–1998: Wolverhampton Wanderers
- 2000–2003: Millwall
- 2003–2006: Brighton & Hove Albion
- 2007–2009: Motherwell
- 2009–2010: Aberdeen
- 2012: Bristol Rovers
- 2013–2017: Scotland (assistant)
- 2015–2017: Motherwell
- 2017–2018: Barnet
- 2019: Eastbourne Borough (caretaker)
- 2021: Stockport County (assistant)
- 2022: Dundee
- * Club domestic league appearances and goals

Mark Edward McGhee (born 25 May 1957) is a Scottish former professional football player and coach. A forward, McGhee started his career at Morton in 1975 and had spells at Newcastle United, Aberdeen, Hamburg, Celtic, IK Brage and Reading. McGhee was part of the Aberdeen side which won the 1983 European Cup Winners' Cup and 1983 UEFA Super Cup, as well as three Scottish league titles.

McGhee has since managed several clubs in England and Scotland, including Reading, Millwall, Aberdeen and Brighton & Hove Albion.

== Playing career ==
Born in Glasgow, McGhee was raised in Cumbernauld. He began his professional career in 1975 at Morton, where he developed into a very promising centre forward. In December 1977 he moved to England, signing for Newcastle United. Despite an encouraging start at St James' Park, managerial changes at the club saw McGhee fall down the pecking order. McGhee returned north in March 1979 as Alex Ferguson's first major signing for Aberdeen.

McGhee won the SFL Reserve Cup with the Dons in 1979. He made his debut for the Dons on 1 April 1979 against former club Morton. This was the start of the most successful part of McGhee's playing career. He won his first major honour the following season when Aberdeen won the Scottish Premier Division, the first time in 15 years that a club outwith the Old Firm had finished Scottish champions. At Aberdeen McGhee won a further league title in 1984 as well as three successive Scottish Cup wins from 1982 to 1984. He was part of the Aberdeen side that defeated Real Madrid 2-1 (aet.) in the final of the European Cup Winners' Cup in 1983, with his cross from the left setting up John Hewitt to score the winning goal. McGhee also won the European Super Cup the following season, with him scoring against Hamburg in the second leg at Pittodrie. During his time at Aberdeen, he won the Scottish PFA Players' Player of the Year in 1982.

McGhee moved to Germany in the summer of 1984, with Hamburg paying Aberdeen a transfer fee of £330,000. His time there was not a success, primarily due to injuries, and McGhee moved back to Scotland 16 months later after scoring only 12 goals to join Celtic in a £170,000 deal. McGhee won a further Scottish Premier Division title in 1986 as Celtic pipped Hearts on goal difference. The following year saw McGhee struggle at Parkhead through injury and the inability to displace Mo Johnston and Brian McClair from the starting line-up. The departure of several Celtic players in the summer of 1987 gave McGhee a new lease of life at Celtic Park and he won a League and Scottish Cup double in the club's centenary season. He won a further Scottish Cup in 1989 and was Celtic's top scorer that season, also finishing joint top scorer in the Scottish Premier Division alongside Aberdeen's Charlie Nicholas.

McGhee joined Newcastle United for a second time in 1989. He quickly forged a successful partnership up front with Micky Quinn, and their goals saw Newcastle come close to gaining promotion to the First Division (the top-tier in England at that time), finishing third in the Second Division. McGhee and Quinn were less prolific the following season, and the arrival of Ossie Ardiles as manager in March 1991 saw McGhee dropped from the team.

A brief spell in Sweden at IK Brage followed before McGhee joined Reading as player-manager in May 1991. He finally retired from playing in 1993 due to injury.

During his playing career, McGhee won four caps and scored two goals for the Scotland national football team.

== Management career ==
=== Reading ===
McGhee's management career began as player-manager at third tier Reading in 1991, succeeding Ian Porterfield, after being recommended for the post by his ex-manager Alex Ferguson. He officially retired as a player in 1993 and won the Division Two title with the Royals the following season and quickly adapted to the second flight during the next campaign, taking the team as high as second place by December 1994.

=== Leicester City ===
This spotlighted him as an up-and-coming young manager and he was offered the chance to move to Premier League Leicester City. His move in December 1994 came despite having agreed to a long-term contract to remain at Reading. However, he joined with the Foxes adrift in the relegation zone and was unable to keep them up, finishing second bottom.

He remained at Filbert Street post-relegation and set about launching a promotion campaign but did not see the season out after being approached by Wolverhampton Wanderers. He left to take control at Wolves in December 1995, less than 12 months after arriving at Leicester.

=== Wolverhampton Wanderers ===
McGhee moved to Wolves on 13 December 1995, taking his assistant Colin Lee along with him, following the sacking of Graham Taylor. The club's hopes of promotion lay in tatters at the time after just five wins from their previous 21 games, and his first game saw another loss, as they went down 1–0 to Port Vale at Molineux.

He quickly added midfielders Simon Osborn and Steve Corica and tried to implement a more passing game than the direct tactics of his predecessor. The team enjoyed a strong start to 1996, and had lifted themselves to the verge of the play-offs by March. However, their early season form returned in the final months and they failed to win any of their final eight fixtures, ending in 20th, just three points clear of relegation, marking their lowest finish since returning to the division in 1989.

McGhee was given further funds to invest in the summer and brought in Iwan Roberts to boost the attack. The 1996–97 season duly saw them launch a promotion campaign, with ambitions of an automatic spot. However, a poor string of results in the final ten games, allowed surprise package Barnsley to snatch second place behind runaway champions Bolton Wanderers, condemning Wolves to the play-offs. McGhee saw his team concede two late goals in a 3–1 defeat at Crystal Palace in their semi final tie, which ultimately cost them the chance of reaching the Premier League, despite a 2–1 victory in the return leg.

His failure to reach the top flight prompted a tirade from Wolves owner Sir Jack Hayward, who stated that he would no longer be "the golden tit", supplying the club with endless finance. He cut McGhee's spending power and also dismissed his own son Jonathan as chairman, who had been instrumental in bringing McGhee to the club, thus undermining his job security.

The 1997–98 season saw the club largely outside the play-off places, ending in ninth. McGhee's high point of the campaign was their FA Cup run which saw them make the semi-finals for the first time since 1981, and marked his best Cup run as a manager. However, his Wembley dream was dashed by Arsenal (double winners that season) as they edged past the Midlanders 1–0 at Villa Park.

The following season started well for McGhee as he won his opening four games, but the following twelve brought just two victories. This prompted Wolves to fire him on 5 November 1998. His assistant Colin Lee took over the reins on a temporary basis, later made permanent.

He managed a total of 156 competitive games for Wolves; 64 of them were won, 38 drawn and 54 lost.

=== Millwall ===
On 6 July 2000, McGhee joined Coventry City, who were at the time managed by Gordon Strachan, as a scout. After only two months he was appointed manager at Millwall who were playing in the third tier in September 2000, replacing the duo of Keith Stevens and Alan McLeary. McGhee swiftly won the Division Two title in his first season and led the club to the Division One play-offs in the following campaign. Here, he suffered more play-off agony as the club lost to a last minute Birmingham City goal to deny them a place in the final.

The 2002–03 season saw McGhee take the club to ninth, falling eight points short of another play-off finish. The next season saw things take a downward turn as his relationship with chairman Theo Paphitis strained and players began to be sold. McGhee left The New Den on 15 October 2003, following a 0–1 home defeat to Preston North End.

=== Brighton ===
McGhee was appointed manager of Brighton on 28 October 2003, just 13 days after leaving Millwall. He inherited the team left by Steve Coppell, who had moved to Reading. Brighton had been relegated to League One the previous season, but McGhee managed to regain promotion to the Championship in his first season as they won the play-offs, after beating Bristol City 1–0 in the final. He managed to keep the club in the Championship the following season in 2004–05, finishing 20th, their highest league position in 14 years.

However, he led the club to relegation the following season, when they were finally mathematically condemned at home by Sheffield Wednesday. McGhee was sacked as Brighton manager on 8 September 2006 after nearly three years with the club, following three consecutive defeats in the 2006–07 season.

=== Motherwell ===
In February 2007 was reported to have applied for the manager's position at Swansea City. However, on 18 June 2007, he was appointed new manager of Motherwell and to be assisted by Scott Leitch.

McGhee transformed Motherwell from a team that just avoided relegation in the 2006–07 Scottish Premier League to finishing third in the 2007–08 Scottish Premier League, which meant that Motherwell qualified for the 2008–09 UEFA Cup. This was the first time in 13 years that Motherwell had qualified for European competition. Pundits believed this was due to the fluent, attacking style of football that McGhee had introduced. Gordon Strachan, a longtime friend and former teammate of McGhee, recommended him for the then-vacant Scotland job in November 2007. However, despite making the shortlist of candidates, he eventually missed out on the post to George Burley. His sensitive handling of the death of club captain Phil O'Donnell, who collapsed on the pitch during a game with Dundee United and never regained consciousness, enhanced his profile within the club and the wider community.

On 23 May 2008, Hearts made an official approach to Motherwell asking them permission to speak to McGhee about making him their new manager, which Motherwell refused. It was reported that McGhee wanted a meeting with Vladimir Romanov to seek reassurances about team selection and squad control at Hearts before moving. McGhee was expected to move, but McGhee changed his mind before flying to Lithuania to meet with Romanov.

=== Aberdeen ===
On 12 June 2009, McGhee was confirmed as the new manager of Aberdeen. His first competitive match in charge resulted in a 5–1 home defeat by Czech team Sigma Olomouc in the UEFA Europa League. Aberdeen lost the return leg 3–0, resulting in an 8–1 aggregate defeat, which is Aberdeen's heaviest defeat in UEFA competition. After another poor result against First Division side Raith Rovers in February, McGhee said he was spat at by Aberdeen supporters.

On 6 November 2010, Aberdeen fell to a humiliating 9–0 defeat at the hands of Celtic, which set a new club record defeat. McGhee had previously stated to the press "Go and look me up on Wikipedia. I've got a track record". It was announced days later that McGhee had been given a vote of confidence to continue as manager. After further poor results, however, McGhee was sacked on 1 December. The club were second bottom of the SPL and only avoided last place on goal difference. His tenure ended with McGhee being statistically the second least successful Aberdeen manager, only ahead of Alex Miller, with just 17 wins from 62 matches (27.42%).

=== Bristol Rovers ===
On 18 January 2012, McGhee was appointed manager of Bristol Rovers on a two-and-a-half-year contract. His first competitive match in charge was an away game at Cheltenham Town, where a 2–0 victory was secured for Bristol Rovers. He presided over an upturn in form for Bristol Rovers which saw them go from relegation contenders to finishing in mid-table, including beating Burton Albion and Accrington Stanley 7–1 and 5–1 respectively in the final two home games of the season.

The following season, Rovers were expected to be amongst the contenders for promotion, but they struggled for form and were instead again in a relegation battle. On 15 December 2012, following a 4–1 loss to York City McGhee was sacked as manager with Bristol Rovers second from bottom of League Two.

=== Scotland assistant ===
McGhee joined the coaching staff of the Scotland national side on 18 January 2013, as assistant to his close friend Gordon Strachan. Upon his appointment, McGhee said his new job could revive his career following two managerial failures and expressed his delight of his new job. McGhee said that he hoped to continue in the role on a part-time basis after being appointed Motherwell manager in October 2015.

=== Motherwell (second spell) ===
McGhee was appointed manager of Motherwell for a second time on 13 October 2015. He took the club from second bottom in the league to fourth place in early April. McGhee won the SPFL manager of the month award for March 2016. Heavy defeats by Aberdeen (7–2) and Dundee (5–1) in February 2017 led to fan protests against McGhee. This poor run of form and dissatisfaction with the team's performance resulted in McGhee leaving the club on 28 February 2017, with Motherwell three points above the automatic relegation spot.

=== Barnet ===
On 13 November 2017, McGhee was appointed manager of League Two club Barnet. Two months later, Graham Westley took over as Head Coach with McGhee moving to a "head of technical" role at the club. On 19 March, McGhee was dismissed from this role.

=== Eastbourne Borough ===
On 19 February 2019, McGhee agreed to take over at Eastbourne Borough until the end of the 2018/19 season in an interim position after the club had recently sacked their former manager Jamie Howell. McGhee left the club at the end of the season after the appointment of Lee Bradbury.

=== Stockport County ===
On 27 January 2021, McGhee joined National League side Stockport County as joint-assistant manager with Dave Conlon, assisting Simon Rusk who replaced long serving manager Jim Gannon. McGhee departed the club with the sacking of Simon Rusk on 27 October 2021. The club sat tenth in the table.

=== Dundee ===
Despite a six-game SPFL touchline ban hanging over him, McGhee was appointed Dundee manager in February 2022. McGhee was winless in his first 12 games as manager, and finally ended that streak with a league win over Hibernian in May 2022. Despite this, Dundee were relegated to the Scottish Championship the following day. On 14 May 2022, Dundee confirmed they would not renew McGhee's contract at the end of the season. McGhee finished his stint with Dundee with just one win in 14 games, leaving him with a 7.14% win percentage, the lowest of any permanent manager in the club's history.

== Career statistics ==
=== Club ===
Appearances and goals by club, season and competition
Club	Season	League			National Cup		League Cup		Europe		Other		Total	
Club	Season	Division	Apps	Goals	Apps	Goals	Apps	Goals	Apps	Goals	Apps	Goals	Apps	Goals
Greenock Morton	1975–76	Scottish First Division	5	1	1	1	2	0	-	-	-	-	8	2
Greenock Morton	1976–77	Scottish First Division	39	20	1	0	6	6	-	-	-	-	46	26
Greenock Morton	1977–78	Scottish First Division	20	16	0	0	4	1	-	-	-	-	24	17
Greenock Morton	Total		64	37	2	1	12	7	-	-	-	-	78	45
Newcastle United	1977–78	First Division	18	3	2	0	0	0	0	0	-	-	20	3
Newcastle United	1978–79	Second Division	10	2	1	0	1	0	-	-	-	-	12	2
Newcastle United	Total		28	5	3	0	1	0	0	0	-	-	32	5
Aberdeen	1978–79	Scottish Premier Division	11	4	0	0	0	0	0	0	-	-	11	4
Aberdeen	1979–80	Scottish Premier Division	21	7	1	0	7	4	0	0	-	-	29	11
Aberdeen	1980–81	Scottish Premier Division	36	13	2	1	5	3	4	1	-	-	47	18
Aberdeen	1981–82	Scottish Premier Division	31	8	6	3	9	4	6	1	-	-	52	16
Aberdeen	1982–83	Scottish Premier Division	32	16	5	1	7	4	11	6	-	-	55	27
Aberdeen	1983–84	Scottish Premier Division	33	13	6	2	6	3	10	6	-	-	55	24
Aberdeen	Total		164	61	20	7	34	18	31	14	-	-	249	100
Hamburger SV	1984–85	Bundesliga	26	6	1	0	0	0	6	3	-	-	33	9
Hamburger SV	1985–86	Bundesliga	4	1	0	0	0	0	1	0	-	-	5	1
Hamburger SV	Total		30	7	1	0	0	0	7	3	-	-	38	10
Celtic	1985–86	Scottish Premier Division	18	4	3	1	0	0	0	0	-	-	21	5
Celtic	1986–87	Scottish Premier Division	16	1	3	0	1	0	3	1	-	-	23	2
Celtic	1987–88	Scottish Premier Division	24	6	4	1	3	1	1	0	-	-	32	8
Celtic	1988–89	Scottish Premier Division	29	16	5	2	0	0	3	1	-	-	37	19
Celtic	Total		87	27	15	4	4	1	7	2	-	-	113	34
Newcastle United	1989–90	Second Division	46	19	4	5	3	1	-	-	2	0	55	25
Newcastle United	1990–91	Second Division	21	5	2	1	2	0	-	-	-	-	25	6
Newcastle United	Total		67	24	6	6	5	1	-	-	2	0	80	31
IK Brage	1991–92	Division 1 Norra	3	2	0	0	0	0	0	0	-	-	3	2
Reading	1991–92	Third Division	32	5	1	0	2	0	-	-	-	-	35	5
Reading	1992–93	Second Division	13	2	0	0	0	0	-	-	-	-	13	2
Reading	Total		45	7	1	0	2	0	-	-	-	-	48	7
Career total			488	170	48	18	58	27	45	19	2	0	641	234

=== International ===
Appearances and goals by national team and year
National team	Year	Apps	Goals
Scotland	1983	3	1
Scotland	1984	1	1
Total		4	2

Scores and results list Scotland's goal tally first, score column indicates score after each McGhee goal

List of international goals scored by Mark McGhee
No.	Date	Venue	Opponent	Score	Result	Competition
1	12 June 1983	Empire Stadium, Vancouver	Canada	2–0	2–0	Friendly
2	26 May 1984	Hampden Park, Glasgow	England	1–0	1–1	1983–84 British Home Championship

=== Managerial record ===
As of match played 15 May 2022

Managerial record by team and tenure
Team	From	To	Record				
Team	From	To	P	W	D	L	Win %
Reading	10 May 1991	14 December 1994	183	79	51	53	43.2
Leicester City	14 December 1994	7 December 1995	51	16	14	21	31.4
Wolverhampton Wanderers	13 December 1995	5 November 1998	159	65	39	55	40.9
Millwall	25 September 2000	15 October 2003	163	75	39	49	46.0
Brighton & Hove Albion	28 October 2003	8 September 2006	139	40	38	61	28.8
Motherwell	18 June 2007	12 June 2009	88	35	17	36	39.8
Aberdeen	12 June 2009	1 December 2010	62	17	13	32	27.4
Bristol Rovers	18 January 2012	15 December 2012	45	12	12	21	26.7
Motherwell	13 October 2015	28 February 2017	62	22	10	30	35.5
Barnet	13 November 2017	15 January 2018	11	3	0	8	27.3
Eastbourne Borough (Caretaker)	19 February 2019	7 May 2019	11	1	4	6	9.1
Dundee	17 February 2022	31 May 2022	14	1	5	8	7.14
Total			987	366	242	379	37.1

== Honours ==
=== As a player ===
Greenock Morton

- Scottish Football League First Division: 1977–78

Aberdeen

- Scottish Premier Division: 1979–80, 1983–84
- Scottish Cup: 1981–82, 1982–83, 1983–84
- European Cup Winners' Cup: 1982–83
- European Super Cup: 1983

Celtic

- Scottish Premier Division: 1985–86, 1987–88
- Scottish Cup: 1987–88, 1988–89

=== As a manager ===
Reading

- Football League Second Division: 1993–94

Millwall

- Football League Second Division: 2000–01

Brighton & Hove Albion

- Football League Second Division play-offs: 2004
