= Anton Rogan =

Northern Irish footballer (born 1966)

Personal information
- Full name: Anthony Gerard Patrick Rogan
- Date of birth: 25 March 1966 (age 60)
- Place of birth: Belfast, Northern Ireland
- Height: 1.80 m (5 ft 11 in)
- Position: Defender

Youth career
- Red Star
- St Oliver Plunkett FC

Senior career*
Years	Team	Apps	(Gls)
- Distillery
1986–1991	Celtic	127	(3)
1991–1993	Sunderland	46	(1)
1993–1995	Oxford United	58	(3)
1995–1997	Millwall	36	(8)
1997–1999	Blackpool	15	(0)
Total		282	(15)

International career
1987–1996	Northern Ireland	18	(0)
- * Club domestic league appearances and goals

Anton Rogan (born 25 March 1966) is a former professional footballer. His playing career included spells at Lisburn Distillery, Celtic, Sunderland, Oxford United, Millwall and Blackpool. Rogan also played 18 times for the Northern Ireland national team between 1987 and 1996.

== Career ==
Rogan was born in Lenadoon, west Belfast, Northern Ireland. In his youth he had played junior football for St Oliver Plunkett FC and Gaelic football for St Paul's. He began his professional career playing for Distillery before achieving his boyhood dream of signing for Celtic in 1986. Rogan made his first-team debut on 3 January 1987 due to Roy Aitken and Paul McGugan being suspended and Pierce O'Leary being injured. It proved to be a successful start for Rogan as Celtic thrashed Hamilton Accies 8–3. He usually played at left full back or occasionally as a left-side centre half. In 1988, he was part of Celtic's Centenary side that won the League and Cup double.

He transferred to Sunderland in 1991 for two years. He played for Sunderland in the 1992 FA Cup final defeat to Liverpool. The following season, he moved to Oxford United – again for two years. In 1997, he transferred to Millwall and left them for Blackpool in 1999.

The latter part of his career was hampered by hamstring injuries and it was discovered that two broken leg injuries early in his career (initially suffered as a teenager before heading to Celtic) were the root cause of these setbacks.

Anton Rogan's most famous goal was the opener in the 3-0 demolition of city rivals Rangers in 1991, having been a part of the team the previous week that dumped Rangers out of the Scottish Cup. Another of his goals achieved renown for the wrong reasons, when he opened the scoring in the December 1988 World Cup qualifying match in Spain. Rogan's was an own goal, contributing to the hosts' 4–0 victory over Northern Ireland.

== Post-career ==
He now lives in Oxford, with his wife and two sons Liam and Conal, and has retired from football. He made an appearance in central defence for Abingdon Town on 19 July 2008 in Joey Beauchamp's testimonial alongside Ian 'Gudge' Smith against Oxford United. Anton has appeared in numerous testimonials and currently runs a taxi and tour company, Townhouse Executive Travel, with his wife in Woodstock, Oxfordshire.

== Honours ==
Sunderland

- FA Cup runner-up: 1991–92
