= 1985–86 Clydebank F.C. season =

Clydebank F.C.
1985–86 season
- Manager: Sammy Henderson
- Scottish League Premier Division: 10th
- Scottish Cup: 3rd Round
- Scottish League Cup: 3rd Round
Home colours

The 1985–86 season was Clydebank's twentieth season in the Scottish Football League. They competed in the Scottish Premier Division for the second time in their history and finished at the foot of the table but spared relegation due to league reconstruction when the Premier League expanded to 12 teams from the following season. They also competed in the Scottish League Cup and Scottish Cup.

== Results ==
=== Premier Division ===
Match Day	Date	Opponent	H/A	Score	Clydebank Scorer(s)	Attendance
1	10 August	Motherwell	A	0–0		
2	17 August	Dundee	H	4–0		
3	24 August	Celtic	H	0–2		
4	31 August	St Mirren	A	2–0		
5	7 September	Dundee United	A	1–2		
6	14 September	Rangers	H	0–1		
7	28 September	Heart of Midlothian	H	1–0		
8	1 October	Hibernian	A	0–5		
9	5 October	Aberdeen	A	1–3		
10	12 October	Motherwell	H	1–1		
11	19 October	Dundee	A	0–2		
12	30 October	Hibernian	H	2–4		
13	2 November	Rangers	A	0–0		
14	13 November	St Mirren	H	1–1		
15	16 November	Celtic	A	0–2		
16	23 November	Dundee United	H	1–2		
17	30 November	Heart of Midlothian	A	1–4		
18	10 December	Aberdeen	H	2–1		
19	14 December	Motherwell	A	0–3		
20	23 December	Dundee	H	0–0		
21	28 December	Celtic	A	0–1		
22	1 January	St Mirren	A	0–3		
23	4 January	Hibernian	A	3–2		
24	11 January	Rangers	A	2–4		
25	18 January	Dundee United	A	0–4		
26	1 February	Heart of Midlothian	H	1–1		
27	8 February	Aberdeen	A	1–4		
28	1 March	Dundee	A	0–4		
29	15 March	Hibernian	H	1–3		
30	22 March	St Mirren	H	0–2		
31	29 March	Celtic	H	0–5		
32	5 April	Motherwell	H	1–1		
33	12 April	Rangers	H	2–1		
34	19 April	Dundee United	H	1–1		
35	26 April	Heart of Midlothian	A	0–1		
36	3 May	Aberdeen	H	0–6		

==== Final League table ====
Pos	Team	Pld	W	D	L	GF	GA	GD	Pts
6	Dundee	36	14	7	15	45	51	−6	35
7	St Mirren	36	13	5	18	42	63	−21	31
8	Hibernian	36	11	6	19	49	63	−14	28
9	Motherwell	36	7	6	23	33	66	−33	20
10	Clydebank	36	6	8	22	29	77	−48	20

Source: Rsssf
Rules for classification: 1) points; 2) goal difference; 3) number of goals scored.

=== Scottish League Cup ===
Round	Date	Opponent	H/A	Score	Clydebank Scorer(s)	Attendance
R2	21 August	Raith Rovers	H	7–2		
R3	3 September	Dundee United	A	0–2		

=== Scottish Cup ===
Round	Date	Opponent	H/A	Score	Clydebank Scorer(s)	Attendance
R3	25 January	Falkirk	H	0–0		
R3 R	3 February	Falkirk	A	0–1		
