= 2003–04 Partick Thistle F.C. season =

Partick Thistle
- Scottish Premier League: 12th
- Scottish Cup: Quarter-final
- Scottish League Cup: Third round

The 2003–04 season saw Partick Thistle compete in the Scottish Premier League where they finished in 12th position with 26 points, suffering relegation to the Scottish First Division.

== Final league table ==
Pos	Team	Pld	W	D	L	GF	GA	GD	Pts	Qualification or relegation (Note: Teams played each other three times (33 matches), before the league split into two groups (the top six and the bottom six) for the last five matches.)
8	Hibernian	38	11	11	16	41	60	−19	44	Qualification for the UEFA Intertoto Cup second round (Note: Hibernian qualified for the 2004 UEFA Intertoto Cup as the highest placed team to apply to participate in the competition.)
9	Livingston	38	10	13	15	48	57	−9	43	
10	Kilmarnock	38	12	6	20	51	74	−23	42	
11	Aberdeen	38	9	7	22	39	63	−24	34	
12	Partick Thistle (R)	38	6	8	24	39	67	−28	26	Relegation to the Scottish First Division

Source: Scottish Professional Football League
Rules for classification: 1) Points; 2) Goal difference; 3) Goals scored
(R) Relegated

== Results ==
Partick Thistle's score comes first

=== Legend ===
Win	Draw	Loss

=== Scottish Premier League ===
Match	Date	Opponent	Venue	Result	Attendance	Scorers
1	9 August 2003	Livingston	H	1–1	4,220	Milne 31'
2	16 August 2003	Kilmarnock	A	1–2	6,778	Grady 39'
3	23 August 2003	Celtic	H	1–2	9,045	Grady 26'
4	30 August 2003	Motherwell	A	2–2	6,193	Britton 26', Taylor 82'
5	13 September 2003	Aberdeen	A	1–2	10,597	Mitchell 52'
6	20 September 2003	Dundee United	H	0–2	4,711	
7	27 September 2003	Dunfermline Athletic	A	1–2	4,684	Grady 50'
8	4 October 2003	Hibernian	H	0–1	4,125	
9	18 October 2003	Dundee	A	0–1	6,497	
10	25 October 2003	Heart of Midlothian	H	1–4	4,814	Waddell 63'
11	1 November 2003	Rangers	A	1–3	49,551	Grady 82'
12	8 November 2003	Livingston	A	0–2	5,226	
13	22 November 2003	Kilmarnock	H	2–4	4,445	Mitchell 19', Grady 81'
14	29 November 2003	Celtic	A	1–3	58,202	Grady 12'
15	7 December 2003	Motherwell	H	1–0	4,124	McBride 59'
16	13 December 2003	Aberdeen	H	0–3	5,136	
17	23 December 2003	Dundee United	A	0–0	6,440	
18	27 December 2003	Dunfermline Athletic	H	4–1	4,337	Thomson 38', Grady 56', 90', Ross 89'
19	3 January 2004	Hibernian	A	2–3	8,875	Grady 53', 90', Madaschi 78'
20	17 January 2004	Dundee	H	1–2	4,690	Rowson 31'
21	24 January 2004	Heart of Midlothian	A	0–2	10,264	
22	1 February 2004	Rangers	H	0–1	8,220	
23	11 February 2004	Livingston	H	5–2	3,011	Grady 10', Britton (2) 41', 73', McNamee 68' (o.g.), Thomson 82'
24	14 February 2004	Kilmarnock	A	1–2	5,818	Bonnes 52'
25	22 February 2004	Celtic	H	1–4	8,131	Britton 55'
26	28 February 2004	Motherwell	A	0–3	5,814	
27	9 March 2004	Aberdeen	A	0–0	7,395	
28	13 March 2004	Dundee United	H	1–1	3,510	Rowson 65'
29	20 March 2004	Dunfermline Athletic	A	0–1	4,349	
30	27 March 2004	Hibernian	H	1–1	3,155	Thomson 30'
31	3 April 2004	Dundee	A	1–2	5,084	Thomson 14'
32	10 April 2004	Heart of Midlothian	H	1–0	4,043	Thomson 49'
33	17 April 2004	Rangers	A	0–2	49,279	
34	24 April 2004	Dundee	H	0–1	2,727	
35	1 May 2004	Aberdeen	H	2–0	2,839	Grady 10', Mitchell 80'
36	5 May 2004	Hibernian	A	2–1	5,447	Murdock 60' (o.g.), Grady 38'
37	9 May 2004	Livingston	A	2–2	3,160	Madaschi 5', Grady 63'
38	15 May 2004	Kilmarnock	H	2–2	4,124	Grady (2) 19', 90'

=== Scottish Cup ===
Match	Date	Opponent	Venue	Result	Attendance	Scorers
R3	10 January 2004	Greenock Morton	H	3–0	6,613	Rowson 35', Grady (2) 53', 90'
R4	7 February 2004	Hamilton Academical	H	5–1	4,004	Mitchell 40', Britton (2) 54', 62', McBride 81', Bonnes 84'
QF	6 March 2004	Dunfermline Athletic	H	0–3	5,335	

=== Scottish League Cup ===
Match	Date	Opponent	Venue	Result	Attendance	Scorers
R2	24 September 2003	Peterhead	A	2–2 (4–3 pens)	1,350	Grady 2', Milne 108'
R3	4 December 2003	Celtic	H	0–2	5,700	
