= 2002–03 Partick Thistle F.C. season =

Partick Thistle
- Manager: John Lambie
- Stadium: Firhill Stadium
- Scottish Premier League: 10th
- Scottish Cup: Third Round
- Scottish League Cup: Quarter-final

The 2002–03 season saw Partick Thistle compete in the Scottish Premier League where they finished in 10th position with 35 points.

== Final league table ==
| Pos | Team | Pld | W | D | L | GF | GA | GD | Pts | Qualification or relegation (Note: Teams played each other three times (33 matches), before the league split into two groups (the top six and the bottom six) for the last five matches.) |
|---|---|---|---|---|---|---|---|---|---|---|
| 8 | Aberdeen | 38 | 13 | 10 | 15 | 41 | 54 | −13 | 49 | |
| 9 | Livingston | 38 | 9 | 8 | 21 | 48 | 62 | −14 | 35 | |
| 10 | Partick Thistle | 38 | 8 | 11 | 19 | 37 | 58 | −21 | 35 | |
| 11 | Dundee United | 38 | 7 | 11 | 20 | 35 | 68 | −33 | 32 | |
| 12 | Motherwell | 38 | 7 | 7 | 24 | 45 | 71 | −26 | 28 | Spared from relegation (Note: As the First Division champions Falkirk did not have a suitable ground for the SPL, bottom club Motherwell were spared from relegation.) |

Source: Scottish Professional Football League
Rules for classification: 1) Points; 2) Goal difference; 3) Goals scored

== Results ==
Partick Thistle's score comes first

=== Legend ===
| Win | Draw | Loss |

=== Scottish Premier League ===
| Match | Date | Opponent | Venue | Result | Attendance | Scorers |
|---|---|---|---|---|---|---|
| 1 | 3 August 2002 | Dundee United | H | 0–0 | 6,375 | |
| 2 | 10 August 2002 | Motherwell | A | 1–1 | 5,788 | Burns 81' |
| 3 | 17 August 2002 | Livingston | H | 2–2 | 4,255 | Mitchell (2) 33', 64' |
| 4 | 24 August 2002 | Celtic | A | 0–1 | 8,053 | |
| 5 | 1 September 2002 | Aberdeen | A | 1–0 | 12,591 | Lilley 31' |
| 6 | 11 September 2002 | Kilmarnock | A | 0–1 | 6,848 | |
| 7 | 14 September 2002 | Dundee | H | 1–1 | 4,552 | Mitchell 41' |
| 8 | 21 September 2002 | Rangers | A | 0–3 | 48,969 | |
| 9 | 28 September 2002 | Heart of Midlothian | H | 2–2 | 6,111 | Archibald (2) 28', 79' |
| 10 | 5 October 2002 | Dunfermline Athletic | A | 1–4 | 5,522 | Mitchell 61' |
| 11 | 19 October 2002 | Hibernian | H | 0–3 | 5,946 | |
| 12 | 26 October 2002 | Dundee United | A | 1–1 | 6,369 | Waddell 86' |
| 13 | 2 November 2002 | Motherwell | H | 2–0 | 5,405 | Hardie 30', Burns 52' |
| 14 | 9 November 2002 | Livingston | A | 0–3 | 6,218 | |
| 15 | 17 November 2002 | Celtic | A | 0–4 | 57,839 | |
| 16 | 23 November 2002 | Aberdeen | H | 2–1 | 6,182 | Lilley 32', Hardie 79' |
| 17 | 30 November 2002 | Kilmarnock | H | 3–0 | 5,055 | Burns (3) 64', 79', 87' |
| 18 | 4 December 2002 | Dundee | A | 1–4 | 5,363 | Britton 70' |
| 19 | 7 December 2002 | Dunfermline Athletic | H | 4–0 | 4,110 | Britton 5', Burns (2) 45', 52' |
| 20 | 14 December 2002 | Heart of Midlothian | A | 0–1 | 9,734 | |
| 21 | 22 December 2002 | Rangers | H | 1–2 | 10,022 | Burns 7' |
| 22 | 26 December 2002 | Hibernian | A | 1–1 | 10,317 | Burns 78' |
| 23 | 29 December 2002 | Dundee United | H | 0–0 | 5,109 | |
| 24 | 2 January 2003 | Motherwell | A | 2–2 | 6,262 | Burns (2) 19', 49' |
| 25 | 28 January 2003 | Livingston | H | 1–3 | 3,541 | Burns 39' |
| 26 | 2 February 2003 | Celtic | H | 0–2 | 7,119 | |
| 27 | 8 February 2003 | Aberdeen | H | 1–0 | 11,334 | Burns 13' |
| 28 | 23 February 2003 | Kilmarnock | A | 0–1 | 5,651 | |
| 29 | 1 March 2003 | Dundee | H | 1–3 | 4,599 | Buchan 31' |
| 30 | 9 March 2003 | Dunfermline Athletic | A | 0–0 | 4,746 | |
| 31 | 15 March 2003 | Hibernian | H | 0–1 | 4,511 | |
| 32 | 5 April 2003 | Rangers | A | 0–2 | 49,472 | |
| 33 | 12 April 2003 | Heart of Midlothian | H | 1–1 | 5,288 | Mitchell 73' |
| 34 | 26 April 2003 | Motherwell | H | 3–0 | 4,870 | Burns 29', Britton (2) 68', 90' |
| 35 | 3 May 2003 | Livingston | A | 1–3 | 5,349 | Lilley 45' |
| 36 | 10 May 2003 | Aberdeen | A | 1–2 | 9,960 | Burns 17' |
| 37 | 17 May 2003 | Dundee United | H | 0–1 | 6,357 | |
| 38 | 24 May 2003 | Hibernian | A | 3–2 | 9,286 | Britton 29', Rowson 52', Burns 86' |

=== Scottish Cup ===
| Match | Date | Opponent | Venue | Result | Attendance | Scorers |
|---|---|---|---|---|---|---|
| R3 | 25 January 2003 | Dundee | H | 0–2 | 4,825 | |

=== Scottish League Cup ===
| Match | Date | Opponent | Venue | Result | Attendance | Scorers |
|---|---|---|---|---|---|---|
| R2 | 24 September 2002 | Berwick Rangers | A | 3–0 | 563 | Hardie (2) 19', 32', Buchan 35' |
| R3 | 22 October 2002 | Dundee | H | 1–0 | 2,652 | Hardie 86' |
| QF | 6 November 2002 | Celtic | A | 1–1 (4–5 pens) | 26,333 | Burns 50' |
