= Ray Grant =

Scottish footballer (born 1996)

Personal information
- Full name: Raymond Michael Grant
- Date of birth: 1 September 1996 (age 30)
- Place of birth: Glasgow, Scotland
- Position: Midfielder

Youth career
- 2010–2015: Norwich City

Senior career*
Years	Team	Apps	(Gls)
2015–2017	Norwich City	0	(0)
2017	→ Dagenham & Redbridge (loan)	3	(0)
2018–2020	Clyde	99	(3)
2020–2021	Alloa Athletic	24	(0)
2021–2022	Stirling Albion	23	(1)
2022–2025	Clyde	64	(2)

International career
2014	Scotland U19	1	(0)
- * Club domestic league appearances and goals as of 31 May 2025

Raymond Michael Grant (born 1 September 1996) is a Scottish professional footballer. Grant began his career as a youth player for Norwich City, before progressing to the first team in 2015. He has since played for Dagenham & Redbridge, Clyde (two spells), Alloa Athletic and Stirling Albion. Grant has also played for the Scotland U19s.

== Club career ==
Grant was raised in Morningthorpe, Norfolk, and started his career with local side Norwich City, joining them at under-15 level in 2010. He progressed through the various youth teams to go on and sign his first professional contract in April 2015. He became a regular in the under-21 squad and signed a one-year contract extension in June 2016 as Norwich were relegated from the Premier League to the EFL Championship. During the 2016–17 season he featured for the under-23 side in the newly formed Premier League 2 development competition and also featured in four EFL Trophy fixtures. In January 2017, he made his first-team debut in the FA Cup third-round replay 1–0 defeat to Southampton, replacing Ben Godfrey as a late substitute. In February 2017, he was sent out on loan to National League challengers Dagenham & Redbridge on a youth loan until the end of the season. He made his debut a couple of days later, playing the first half in the 2–1 home defeat to Guiseley. He struggled to break into the starting line-up and only made three appearances during his loan spell before he was recalled by Norwich in late March. Grant was released by Norwich at the end of the 2016–17 season.

Grant signed for Scottish League Two club Clyde in February 2018. In August 2020, Grant signed for Scottish Championship side Alloa Athletic, the club managed by his father Peter. Both Grants left Alloa at the end of the 2020–21 season, and Ray signed for Stirling Albion in May 2021. On 6 May 2022, Grant rejoined former club Clyde on a one-year contract. Grant would play a further 3 seasons for the Bully Wee before being released in 2025.

== International career ==
Grant received his first call-up to Scotland in August 2014 for the under-19 side for a friendly against Belgium. He started the match in the 2–0 defeat, which later proved to be his only international appearance. He also received a call-up to the friendly against Czech Republic in September, but failed to make an appearance.

== Personal life ==
Grant comes from a footballing family with his father, Peter Grant, a former Scotland international who played for Celtic and Norwich, and also managed the latter. His older brother, Peter Grant Jr. plays alongside Raymond at Clyde FC

== Career statistics ==
As of match played 30 April 2022

Appearances and goals by club, season and competition
Club	Season	League			Cup		League Cup		Other		Total	
Club	Season	Division	Apps	Goals	Apps	Goals	Apps	Goals	Apps	Goals	Apps	Goals
Norwich City	2015–16	Premier League	0	0	0	0	0	0	—		0	0
Norwich City	2016–17	Championship	0	0	1	0	0	0	—		1	0
Norwich City	Total		0	0	1	0	0	0	—		1	0
Norwich City U23	2016–17	—			—		—		4 (Note: Appearance(s) in EFL Trophy)	0	4	0
Dagenham & Redbridge (loan)	2016–17	National League	3	0	0	0	—		0	0	3	0
Clyde	2017–18	Scottish League Two	16	0	0	0	0	0	0	0	16	0
Clyde	2018–19	Scottish League Two	36	2	1	0	3	0	5 (Note: One appearance in the Scottish Challenge Cup, four in Scottish League Two play-offs)	0	45	2
Clyde	2019–20	Scottish League One	28	1	3	0	3	0	4 (Note: Appearance(s) in the Scottish Challenge Cup)	0	38	1
Clyde	Total		80	3	4	0	6	0	9	0	99	3
Alloa Athletic	2020–21	Scottish Championship	24	0	1	0	5	0	0	0	30	0
Stirling Albion	2021–22	Scottish League Two	23	1	2	0	1	0	1	0	27	1
Career total			130	4	9	0	12	0	14	0	164	4
