= Kenny Milne =

Kenneth or Kenny Milne may refer to:

- Kenny Milne (footballer) (born 1979), Scottish former footballer
- Kenny Milne (rugby union) (born 1961), former Scotland rugby union player
- F. Kenneth Milne (1885–1980), Australian architect
