= Ryan O'Leary =

Scottish footballer (born 1987)

Personal information
- Date of birth: 24 August 1987 (age 39)
- Place of birth: Glasgow, Scotland
- Position: Defender

Senior career*
Years	Team	Apps	(Gls)
2004–2005	Aberdeen	2	(0)
2005–2010	Kilmarnock	30	(0)
2010	→ Dundee (loan)	8	(0)
2011–2013	Kilmarnock	39	(1)
2013–2014	Orange County Blues	11	(0)
Total		90	(1)

International career
2007	Scotland U20	3	(0)
2007–2008	Scotland U21	2	(0)
- * Club domestic league appearances and goals

Ryan O'Leary (born 24 August 1987) is a Scottish former professional footballer who played as a defender. O'Leary is the son of former Republic of Ireland international footballer Pierce O'Leary and the nephew of David O'Leary.

== Club career ==
O'Leary attended St. Aloysius' College, Glasgow. He started his football career with Aberdeen and joined Kilmarnock for an undisclosed fee in 2005. After appearing sporadically for Kilmarnock due to injuries, Gordon Chisholm signed O'Leary for Dundee on loan until the end of the 2009–10 season.

O'Leary left Kilmarnock when his contract expired in 2010 taking nine months out of football for personal reasons. However, after failing to win a deal at Vancouver Whitecaps following a trial, he returned to Kilmarnock and signed a short-term deal in March 2011.

== International career ==
In February 2007 he was named in a Republic of Ireland under-21 squad, but he declined, choosing to represent the country of his birth instead. He subsequently represented Scotland at under–21 level.

== Acting career ==
O'Leary portrays Davey Gunn in CBC Television's sports drama 21 Thunder and is credited as Ryan Pierce. The series premiered in Canada on 31 July 2017.
