= 1986–87 Clydebank F.C. season =

Clydebank F.C.
1986–87 season
- Manager: Sammy Henderson
- Scottish League Premier Division: 11th
- Scottish Cup: Quarter-final
- Scottish League Cup: 3rd Round

The 1986–87 season was Clydebank's twenty-first season in the Scottish Football League. They competed in the Scottish Premier Division for the third time and the second in a row. They finished 11th in the 12 team division and relegated to the First Division. They also competed in the Scottish League Cup and Scottish Cup which they made the Quarter-finals.

== Results ==
=== Premier Division ===
Match Day	Date	Opponent	H/A	Score	Clydebank Scorer(s)	Attendance
1	9 August	Hamilton Academical	A	1–0		
2	13 August	Dundee United	H	0–0		
3	16 August	Celtic	H	0–1		
4	23 August	St Mirren	A	1–0		
5	30 August	Falkirk	H	1–2		
6	6 September	Heart of Midlothian	A	1–2		
7	13 September	Rangers	A	0–4		
8	20 September	Aberdeen	H	1–3		
9	27 September	Motherwell	A	1–0		
10	4 October	Dundee	H	0–2		
11	8 October	Hibernian	A	2–3		
12	11 October	Hamilton Academical	H	2–1		
13	18 October	Dundee United	A	0–2		
14	25 October	St Mirren	H	1–1		
15	29 October	Celtic	A	0–6		
16	1 November	Falkirk	A	0–1		
17	8 November	Heart of Midlothian	H	0–3		
18	15 November	Rangers	H	1–4		
19	19 November	Aberdeen	A	0–5		
20	22 November	Motherwell	H	2–3		
21	29 November	Dundee	A	3–3		
22	3 December	Hibernian	H	0–0		
23	6 December	Hamilton Academcial	A	0–0		
24	13 December	Dundee United	H	1–2		
25	20 December	St Mirren	A	1–3		
26	27 December	Celtic	H	1–1		
27	1 January	Falkirk	H	2–1		
28	3 January	Heart of Midlothian	A	0–3		
29	10 January	Rangers	A	0–5		
30	24 January	Motherwell	A	2–3		
31	27 January	Aberdeen	H	0–5		
32	7 February	Dundee	H	1–1		
33	14 February	Hibernian	A	1–4		
34	28 February	Hamilton Academical	H	2–3		
35	7 March	Dundee United	A	1–1		
36	21 March	Celtic	A	0–3		
37	24 March	St Mirren	H	2–1		
38	28 March	Heart of Midlothian	H	1–1		
39	4 April	Falkirk	A	0–0		
40	11 April	Aberdeen	A	1–1		
41	18 April	Rangers	H	0–3		
42	25 April	Dundee	A	1–4		
43	2 May	Motherwell	H	0–0		
44	9 May	Hibernian	H	1–2		

==== Final League table ====
Pos	Team	Pld	W	D	L	GF	GA	GD	Pts	Qualification or relegation
8	Motherwell	44	11	12	21	43	64	−21	34	
9	Hibernian	44	10	13	21	44	70	−26	33	
10	Falkirk	44	8	10	26	31	70	−39	26	
11	Clydebank (R)	44	6	12	26	35	93	−58	24	Relegation to the 1987–88 Scottish First Division
12	Hamilton Academical (R)	44	6	9	29	39	93	−54	21	Relegation to the 1987–88 Scottish First Division

Source: Statto
Rules for classification: 1) points; 2) goal difference; 3) number of goals scored.
(R) Relegated

=== Scottish League Cup ===
Round	Date	Opponent	H/A	Score	Clydebank Scorer(s)	Attendance
R2	20 August	St Johnstone	H	3–0		
R3	27 August	Motherwell	A	0–2		

=== Scottish Cup ===
Round	Date	Opponent	H/A	Score	Clydebank Scorer(s)	Attendance
R3	3 February	Falkirk	A	0–0		
R3 R	9 February	Falkirk	H	3–1		
R4	21 February	Hibernian	H	1–0		
R5	14 March	Dundee	H	0–4		
