= Peter Grant (footballer, born 1965) =

Scottish football manager (born 1965)

Personal information
- Full name: Peter Grant
- Date of birth: 30 August 1965 (age 61)
- Place of birth: Coatbridge, Scotland
- Height: 5 ft 9 in (1.76 m)
- Position: Midfielder

Senior career*
Years	Team	Apps	(Gls)
1982–1997	Celtic	362	(15)
1997–1999	Norwich City	68	(3)
1999–2000	Reading	29	(1)
2000–2002	AFC Bournemouth	15	(0)
Total		474	(19)

International career
1989	Scotland	2	(0)

Managerial career
- 2006–2007: Norwich City
- 2015: Fulham (caretaker)
- 2019–2021: Alloa Athletic
- 2021: Dunfermline Athletic
- * Club domestic league appearances and goals

Peter Grant (born 30 August 1965) is a Scottish football player and coach. During his playing career, Grant played for Celtic, Norwich City, Reading and AFC Bournemouth. He was awarded a testimonial match, played against Bayern Munich, by Celtic in 1997. Grant played in two full international matches for Scotland, both in 1989.

Since retiring as a player, Grant has since worked as a football coach. He was manager of Norwich City for a year, and also briefly the caretaker manager of Fulham. Grant has also managed Scottish sides Alloa Athletic and Dunfermline Athletic.

== Playing career ==
He was captain of the Celtic team that won the inaugural Scottish Youth Cup in 1983–84. Grant made his debut as a teenager for Celtic in a 1984 Old Firm game against Rangers. He was a key figure in league campaigns, such as the 1985–86 Scottish Premier Division which Celtic won in the last game of the season, the 1987–88 where Celtic clinched the league and cup double in their centenary season, and the 1989 Scottish Cup Final against Rangers. Grant played in the 1989 final having missed the 1988 final due to injury.

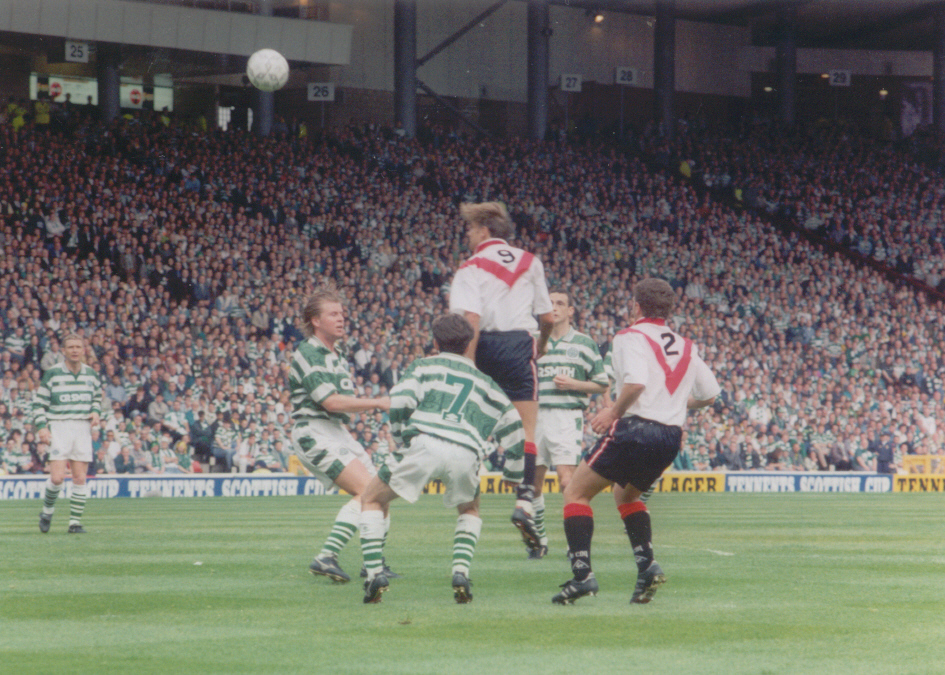
Celtic v Airdrie, 1995 Scottish Cup Final; Grant on far left

Celtic would experience a barren period after 1989, consistently failing to challenge for silverware and almost going bankrupt in 1993. 1994 saw the arrival as Celtic manager of Grant's former teammate Tommy Burns who saw Grant as being pivotal in his plans to revive the club. The barren period would end in 1995 with Celtic winning the 1995 Scottish Cup Final against Airdrie, with Grant at the heart of the team. Only a few weeks before, Grant had received a bad knee injury in the final league game of the season, but he concealed the severity of this injury and played through the pain barrier to help Celtic to their first trophy in 6 years. Grant maintained his place as a regular (31 appearances) in the 1995–96 season. His loyalty to Celtic was rewarded with a testimonial match, played against Bayern Munich in January 1997.

After making 483 appearances for Celtic in all competitions between 1984 and 1997, Grant signed for Norwich City for a fee of £200,000. Mike Walker, in his second stint as Norwich City manager, had previously tried to sign Grant soon after taking over from Dave Stringer at Carrow Road in 1992 – however, Celtic had been unwilling to let Grant leave, and Walker opted for Gary Megson as a midfielder enforcer.

After deciding against taking on former Barcelona captain (and European Cup winner) Jose Maria Bakero, Walker this time found Celtic willing to let Grant — now 32 – move to East Anglia. In 1997–98, a difficult season with the club suffering a number of injuries to key players, Grant started 32 games, scoring 3 times; he made 31 starts (coming on as substitute twice) the following season under Bruce Rioch, before being transferred to Reading in summer 1999.

== Management and coaching career ==
After serving AFC Bournemouth as player-coach and then assistant manager, Grant enjoyed a successful time as assistant manager to Alan Pardew at West Ham United. He joined the club in January 2004, helping them reach the 2006 FA Cup Final and finish ninth in their first season back in the English Premier League.

=== Norwich City manager ===
In October 2006, Grant was appointed manager of Norwich City. On 14 October he was in the stands to see his new side draw 3–3 with Queens Park Rangers at Loftus Road, presided over by caretaker manager Martin Hunter. Grant opted to retain Hunter as a coach, but also appointed a new assistant manager, Jim Duffy. Hunter eventually left the club in the summer of 2007 to take up a coaching position at Watford. Grant's first signing for Norwich was Jamie Ashdown from Portsmouth on a one-month loan. Grant generally made a good start to his managerial career only losing 2 league games out of his first 6 although this was a heavy 5–0 defeat to Stoke and a defeat to local rivals Ipswich. They did get wins against high flying teams such as Birmingham and Cardiff. Norwich only won once in the league in December and January, which put them within three points off the relegation zone at one point. Consecutive away wins at relegation rivals Barnsley and Luton Town all but ended any risk of relegation, and City finished the season in 16th place.

In the summer of 2007 Grant prepared for his first full season in charge at Carrow Road by signing Jamie Cureton, Jon Otsemobor, David Marshall. He also signed Julien Brellier and David Strihavka, both of whom struggled to perform and left by January. However, he expressed his frustration at losing Rob Earnshaw and Dickson Etuhu as a result of buy-out clauses in their contracts. City's season started with a goalless draw at Preston and a 2–1 home win against Southampton. After this it all started to go wrong and City only picked up one win in the next few games, against Crystal Palace. In October 2007, Norwich had lost five out of six games, and failed to score in any of them. The last game of this run was a televised 1–0 defeat to Queens Park Rangers, who had yet to register a win in the season. Grant announced after the match he was considering his future at the club, and the next day he resigned as manager.

=== First team coach ===
On 8 July 2008, he joined West Bromwich Albion as first-team coach, replacing Craig Shakespeare. Grant, who holds a UEFA Pro Licence, was a team-mate of Albion manager Tony Mowbray at Celtic.

He was appointed the first-team coach at Celtic in June 2009, after West Bromwich Albion agreed compensation, believed to be in the region of £2.5 million, for the management team of Tony Mowbray, Mark Venus and Grant. On 25 March 2010, Grant was dismissed as first-team coach at Celtic, along with Mowbray and Venus, after a 4–0 loss to St Mirren.

In July 2010 Grant was appointed first-team coach at Birmingham City. before following McLeish to Aston Villa as assistant manager. McLeish and Grant were sacked by Aston Villa after one season. Grant joined McLeish at Nottingham Forest as a first team coach in December 2012.

Fulham appointed Grant as first team coach on 19 June 2014. Following manager Felix Magath's departure from the club in September, Grant's role changed to that of Lead Professional Development Coach/Under-21 Manager. Grant was appointed caretaker manager of the Fulham first team in November 2015, following the departure of Kit Symons. He returned to the development coach role after a new manager was appointed.

=== Scotland national team ===
In May 2017, Grant was appointed as assistant coach for the Scotland national under-20 football team for the 2017 Toulon Tournament. It was also announced he would assist the Scotland under-21 team for their fixtures in September 2017. Alex McLeish appointed Grant to an assistant coaching position with the Scotland national team in March 2018. Alex McLeish and his staff, including Grant, was fired on 18 April 2019.

=== Alloa Athletic manager ===
Grant was appointed manager of Alloa Athletic in July 2019. Alloa finished bottom of the 2020–21 Scottish Championship, and were relegated to Scottish League One. Alloa announced on 21 April that Grant would leave at the end of the season, when his contract expired.

=== Dunfermline ===
Scottish Championship club Dunfermline Athletic appointed Grant as their manager on 28 May 2021. After five months in charge and no league wins, Dunfermline parted ways with Grant.

== Personal life ==
His sons Peter and Ray also became professional footballers.

== Managerial statistics ==
As of match played 30 October 2021

Team	From	To	Record				
Team	From	To	G	W	D	L	Win %
Norwich City	16 October 2006	9 October 2007	54	18	12	24	33.3
Alloa Athletic	10 July 2019	30 April 2021	70	20	18	32	28.6
Dunfermline Athletic	28 May 2021	31 October 2021	18	3	7	8	16.7
Career total			142	41	37	64	28.9

== Honours ==
Celtic

- Scottish league champions (2): 1985–86, 1987–88
- Scottish Cup winners (3): 1985, 1989, 1995
- Scottish Youth Cup winners (1): 1984
