= Mark Smith (footballer, born 1964) =

Scottish footballer (born 1964)

Personal information
- Full name: Mark Alexander Smith
- Date of birth: 16 December 1964 (age 61)
- Place of birth: Bellshill, Scotland
- Height: 5 ft 9 in (1.75 m)
- Position: Winger

Senior career*
Years	Team	Apps	(Gls)
1983–1986	Queen's Park	82	(7)
1986–1987	Celtic	6	(0)
1987–1989	Dunfermline Athletic	52	(6)
1989–1990	→ Hamilton Academical (loan)	5	(1)
1989–1990	→ Stoke City (loan)	2	(0)
1990–1991	Nottingham Forest	0	(0)
1990	→ Reading (loan)	3	(0)
1991	→ Mansfield Town (loan)	7	(0)
1991–1995	Shrewsbury Town	78	(4)
1995–1996	Queen's Park	1	(0)
1996	Ayr United	10	(1)
1996–1998	Queen's Park	23	(0)
Total		269	(19)
- * Club domestic league appearances and goals

Mark Alexander Smith (born 16 December 1964) is a Scottish former footballer who played in the English Football League for Mansfield Town, Reading, Nottingham Forest, Shrewsbury Town and Stoke City. In Scotland he played for Queen's Park, Celtic, Dunfermline Athletic, Hamilton Academical and Ayr United.

== Career ==
Smith was born in Bellshill and began his career with Queen's Park. After impressing enough he earned the chance to play for Celtic but managed just six appearances in his time at Celtic Park and left for Dunfermline Athletic. Smith spent two seasons at East End Park making 52 league appearances for the "Pars" scoring six goals. During his time with Dunfermline he spent time out on loan at Hamilton Academical and English side Stoke City. He was at Stoke for a month in the 1989–90 season and managed just two appearances for the "Potters". Nottingham Forest were seemingly impressed with Smith's performances and he joined them after his loan at Stoke ended. However, he failed to make an appearance for Forest and was instead loaned out to Third Division Reading and then Mansfield Town before signing for Shrewsbury Town. He enjoyed the best spell of his career with the "Shrews" where he spent four seasons helping the side win the Third Division title in 1993–94. He returned to Scotland to play for old club Queen's Park and after playing for Ayr United he made a third return to Queen's Park.

== Career statistics ==
Appearances and goals by club, season and competition
Club	Season	League			FA Cup		League Cup		Other (Note: Includes Football League Trophy.)		Total	
Club	Season	Division	Apps	Goals	Apps	Goals	Apps	Goals	Apps	Goals	Apps	Goals
Stoke City (loan)	1989–90	Second Division	2	0	0	0	0	0	0	0	2	0
Nottingham Forest	1989–90	First Division	0	0	0	0	0	0	0	0	0	0
Reading (loan)	1990–91	Third Division	3	0	0	0	0	0	0	0	3	0
Mansfield Town (loan)	1990–91	Third Division	7	0	0	0	0	0	0	0	7	0
Shrewsbury Town	1991–92	Third Division	22	1	1	1	4	0	2	0	29	2
Shrewsbury Town	1992–93	Third Division	31	1	2	0	0	0	2	0	35	1
Shrewsbury Town	1993–94	Third Division	8	0	1	0	1	0	1	0	11	0
Shrewsbury Town	1994–95	Second Division	17	2	0	0	0	0	1	0	18	2
Career total			90	4	4	1	5	0	4	0	103	5

== Honours ==
Shrewsbury Town

- Football League Third Division: 1993–94
