= 1986–87 Scottish League Cup =

Tournament details
- Country: Scotland

Final positions
- Champions: Rangers
- Runners-up: Celtic

The 1986–87 Scottish League Cup was the forty-first season of Scotland's second football knockout competition. The competition was won by Rangers, who defeated Celtic in the Final.

== First round ==
Home team	Score	Away team	Date
Albion Rovers	3–1	Berwick Rangers	12 August 1986
Arbroath	2–1	Raith Rovers	13 August 1986
Cowdenbeath	0–1	St Johnstone	13 August 1986
Meadowbank Thistle	1–4	Stirling Albion	13 August 1986
Stenhousemuir	1–0	Queen's Park	13 August 1986
Stranraer	0–2	East Stirlingshire	13 August 1986

== Second round ==
Home team	Score	Away team	Date
Aberdeen	4–0	Alloa Athletic	20 August 1986
Albion Rovers	2–2	Forfar Athletic	20 August 1986
Brechin City	0–1	Hamilton Academical	19 August 1986
Celtic	2–0	Airdrieonians	20 August 1986
Clyde	2–1	Falkirk	19 August 1986
Clydebank	3–0	St Johnstone	20 August 1986
Dumbarton	1–0	Stirling Albion	20 August 1986
Dunfermline Ath	0–2	St Mirren	20 August 1986
Heart of Midlothian	0–2	Montrose	19 August 1986
Hibernian	1–0	East Stirlingshire	20 August 1986
Kilmarnock	1–2	Ayr United	20 August 1986
Morton	2–5	Dundee	20 August 1986
Motherwell	4–0	Arbroath	20 August 1986
Partick Thistle	0–1	East Fife	20 August 1986
Queen of the South	0–1	Dundee United	20 August 1986
Stenhousemuir	1–4	Rangers	20 August 1986

== Third round ==
Home team	Score	Away team	Date
Aberdeen	3–1	Clyde	27 August 1986
Ayr United	0–3	Dundee United	27 August 1986
Celtic	3–0	Dumbarton	27 August 1986
Dundee	4–0	Montrose	27 August 1986
East Fife	0–0	Rangers	27 August 1986
Forfar Athletic	5–1	St Mirren	27 August 1986
Hamilton Academical	0–1	Hibernian	27 August 1986
Motherwell	2–0	Clydebank	27 August 1986

== Quarter-finals ==
Home team	Score	Away team	Date
Aberdeen	1–1	Celtic	3 September 1986
Hibernian	1–2	Dundee United	3 September 1986
Motherwell	2–1	Forfar Athletic	3 September 1986
Rangers	3–1	Dundee	3 September 1986

== Semi-finals ==
Home team	Score	Away team	Date
Motherwell	2–2	Celtic	23 September 1986
Rangers	2–1	Dundee United	24 September 1986

== Final ==
26 October 1986

Rangers	2–1	Celtic
Durrant 62'; Cooper 84' (pen.)	Report	McClair 70'

Hampden Park, Glasgow
Attendance: 74,219
Referee: David Syme
