= Ian Johnson (footballer, born 1975) =

English footballer

Personal information
- Full name: Ian Johnson
- Date of birth: 1 September 1975 (age 51)
- Place of birth: Sunderland, England
- Position: Winger

Youth career
- 19xx–1994: Middlesbrough

Senior career*
Years	Team	Apps	(Gls)
1994–1995	Middlesbrough	2	(0)
1995	Bradford City	2	(0)
- Blyth Spartans
- Durham City
- Ashington
Total		4+	(0+)
- * Club domestic league appearances and goals

Ian Johnson (born 1 September 1975) is an English former professional footballer who played as a winger.

== Career ==
Born in Sunderland, Johnson made four appearances in the Football League for Middlesbrough and Bradford City. He later played non-league football for Blyth Spartans, Durham City and Ashington.
