= Frank Connor =

Scottish footballer and manager (1936–2022)

Personal information
- Date of birth: 13 February 1936
- Place of birth: Airdrie, North Lanarkshire, Scotland
- Date of death: 3 March 2022 (aged 86)
- Position: Goalkeeper

Youth career
- Polkemmet Juniors
- Blantyre Celtic

Senior career*
| Years | Team | Apps | (Gls) |
| 1961–1962 | Celtic | 2 | (0) |
| 1962–1963 | Portadown | | |
| 1963–1964 | St Mirren | 6 | (0) |
| 1964–1967 | Derry City | | |
| 1967–1968 | Portadown | | |
| 1968–1969 | Albion Rovers (player-coach) | 8 | (0) |
| 1975–1976 | Cowdenbeath (player-manager) | 1 | (0) |

Managerial career
- 1974–1976: Cowdenbeath
- 1980–1982: Berwick Rangers
- 1982–1983: Motherwell (assistant)
- 1983–1986: Celtic (assistant)
- 1986–1990: Raith Rovers
- 1990–1993: Hearts (assistant)
- 1993: Celtic (caretaker)
- * Club domestic league appearances and goals

Frank Connor (13 February 1936 – 3 March 2022) was a Scottish football player and manager.

== Career ==
As a player, he played for Celtic, Portadown, St Mirren, Derry City, Albion Rovers and Cowdenbeath. After coaching at Celtic and Albion Rovers, Connor moved to Cowdenbeath in 1974 as player-manager, before a spell as assistant manager at Morton. He managed Berwick Rangers between 1980 and 1982 and then had a spell working under Jock Wallace at Motherwell as assistant manager.

In the summer of 1983, Connor moved back to Celtic as new manager David Hay's assistant. He spent 2 1/2 years in that role at Parkhead until he was sacked by Hay in February 1986. He then went to manage Raith Rovers from 1986 to 1990. Connor led Raith Rovers to promotion to the Scottish First Division in his first season in charge there, and succeeded in keeping them in that division for the remainder of his tenure as manager. After leaving Raith Rovers in 1990, Connor had a spell at Hearts as assistant to manager Joe Jordan.

In June 1993, Connor returned once again to Celtic, this time as part of Liam Brady's new backroom team. He was joined at Celtic by his former boss at Hearts, Joe Jordan.

In October 1993 following the departures of Brady and Jordan, Connor took over as caretaker manager of Celtic for four games. He was in charge for two Scottish Premier Division matches (one win, one draw) a UEFA Cup tie first leg (won 1–0 against Sporting CP), and he picked the team to face Rangers (a 2–1 Premier Division Celtic win) three days after Lou Macari's arrival. Connor had an unbeaten record in charge of Celtic.

== Personal life ==
Connor died on 3 March 2022, at the age of 86.
