= Jamie Mitchell (footballer) =

Scottish footballer

Personal information
- Full name: James Mitchell
- Date of birth: 6 November 1976 (age 49)
- Place of birth: Glasgow, Scotland
- Position: Midfielder

Senior career*
Years	Team	Apps	(Gls)
1995–1996	Norwich City	0	(0)
1996–1998	Scarborough	96	(14)
1998–2002	Clyde	109	(16)
2002–2005	Partick Thistle	101	(14)
Total		306	(44)
- * Club domestic league appearances and goals

Jamie Mitchell (born 6 November 1976) is a Scottish former footballer.

== Career ==
Mitchell began his career with Norwich City, moving with his family to Norwich from Glasgow and coming through the famed youth academy alongside players like Danny Mills and Craig Bellamy. Mitchell turned professional in 1995 under the management of Martin O`Neill however he was released in 1996 where he was deemed too lightweight to make an impact in the English Premier League . He joined League 2 side Scarborough who had hired former Norwich assistant Mick Wadsworth as manager, Scarborough reached the English League play offs in 1998 however failed to gain promotion and due to financial problems the team was broken up.

Mitchell returned to Scotland to join Clyde. Mitchell was an important part of the Clyde team, winning the Scottish 2nd Division in the 99/2000 season, becoming a fans favourite and winning 3 consecutive Player of the Year awards. He rather controversially joined Clyde's arch rivals Partick Thistle in 2002 who had just been promoted to the Scottish Premier League, he enjoyed a 3 year spell at Thistle before a serious hip injury forced him to retire in 2005.

According to the Scottish Sun, Mitchell had a hip replacement operation in 2010
