= Pierce O'Leary =

Irish footballer

Personal information
- Full name: Pierce O'Leary
- Date of birth: 5 November 1959 (age 66)
- Place of birth: Dublin, Ireland
- Position: Centre-half

Senior career*
Years	Team	Apps	(Gls)
1977–1981	Shamrock Rovers	71	(2)
1978	→ Philadelphia Fury (loan)	14	(0)
1981–1984	Vancouver Whitecaps	61	(1)
1984–1988	Celtic	39	(1)
Total		185	(4)

International career
1978–1980	Republic of Ireland U21	5	(0)
1979–1980	Republic of Ireland	7	(0)
- * Club domestic league appearances and goals

Pierce O'Leary (born 5 November 1959) is an Irish former professional footballer. Pierce is the brother of former Arsenal star and fellow Irish international David O'Leary.

== Playing career ==
Born in Dublin, O'Leary signed for Shamrock Rovers in 1977 under Johnny Giles and made his debut in October and went on to win the FAI Cup in 1978. A week after the Cup Final he signed for Philadelphia Fury where he spent three months. In 1981, he signed for Vancouver Whitecaps before joining Celtic in November 1984.

O'Leary earned youth caps and 7 Republic of Ireland national team caps while at Milltown, five Ireland U21 caps and made three appearances for Rovers in European competition. The tall centre-half made his Celtic debut in a 2–1 Scottish Cup victory at Hamilton Accies on 30 January 1985. He came on as substitute in the 1985 Scottish Cup Final as Celtic came from behind to defeat Dundee United 2–1. He then made enough appearances to claim a League Championship medal after Celtic pipped Hearts for the title on the final day of the 1985–86 season. He was forced to retire in 1988 due to recurring pelvic trouble.

Pierce's son Ryan O'Leary is also now a professional footballer and played with Kilmarnock.

== Post-playing career ==
Prior to retiring from football in 1988, O'Leary had set up an industrial cleaning business in Glasgow in partnership with Packie Bonner. Bonner's involvement only lasted a few years, but under O'Leary the business secured numerous contracts with offices, shops and hospitals. However, O'Leary went bankrupt in March 2013 and a new business has since been set up with his wife as director.
