= Paul McGugan =

Scottish footballer

Personal information
- Full name: Paul Joseph McGugan
- Date of birth: 17 July 1964 (age 62)
- Place of birth: Glasgow, Scotland
- Position: Centre back

Youth career
- Eastercraigs

Senior career*
Years	Team	Apps	(Gls)
1980–1987	Celtic	49	(2)
1987–1990	Barnsley	49	(2)
1990–1994	Chesterfield	77	(6)
- * Club domestic league appearances and goals

Paul Joseph McGugan (born 17 July 1964) is a Scottish former professional footballer who played as a central defender for Celtic, Barnsley and Chesterfield.

== Career ==
McGugan signed for Celtic from Eastercraigs Amateurs in April 1980. He made his first team debut at 19 years of age in a 3–2 win over Hibernian on 28 April 1984.

However it would be over a year later – season 1985–86 – before he got a sustained run in the first team. That season McGugan made 21 league appearances for Celtic and played in both legs of their first round European Cup Winner's Cup tie against Atlético Madrid. A highlight for McGugan that season was his goal on 1 January 1986 in a 2–0 win over Rangers at Parkhead. The season also saw McGugan win a league championship medal in dramatic fashion as Celtic crushed St Mirren 5–0 on the last day of the season as title rivals Hearts lost 2–0 away at Dundee.

McGugan also played regularly the following season, but the arrival of Billy McNeill as manager in the summer of 1987 saw him drop out of the first team. In October 1987, McNeill sold McGugan to Barnsley for £55,000.

McGugan spent three years in Yorkshire playing for Barnsley, including a memorable 4–0 win over Chelsea in the third round of the FA Cup in January 1989, before moving to Chesterfield in 1990.
