= 1985–86 Scottish Premier Division =

80th season of top-tier football league in Scotland

Scottish Premier Division
- Season: 1985–86
- Champions: Celtic; 5th Premier Division title 34th Scottish title
- European Cup: Celtic
- UEFA Cup: Heart of Midlothian; Dundee United; Rangers
- Cup Winners' Cup: Aberdeen
- Matches: 180
- Goals: 498 (2.77 per match)
- Top goalscorer: Ally McCoist (24)

Celtic won the 1985–86 Scottish Premier Division and became champions in one of the closest finishes in League history. On the final day of the season Hearts were leading Celtic by two points, and a draw against Dundee would have been sufficient to see them win their first League title since the 1959–60 season. Hearts lost 2–0 to Dundee at Dens Park thanks to two late goals by substitute Albert Kidd, while Celtic beat St Mirren 5–0 at Love Street. As a result, Celtic won the league on goal difference.

Relegation was suspended due to league reconstruction, therefore Motherwell and Clydebank retained their Premier Division status.

Much of the season was only viewed by fans in stadiums as a dispute between television companies and the Scottish Football League resulted in no televised Scottish league football between September 1985 and March 1986.

== Table ==
Pos	Team	Pld	W	D	L	GF	GA	GD	Pts	Qualification
1	Celtic (C)	36	20	10	6	67	38	+29	50	Qualification for the European Cup first round
2	Heart of Midlothian	36	20	10	6	59	33	+26	50	Qualification for the UEFA Cup first round
3	Dundee United	36	18	11	7	59	31	+28	47	Qualification for the UEFA Cup first round
4	Aberdeen	36	16	12	8	62	31	+31	44	Qualification for the Cup Winners' Cup first round
5	Rangers	36	13	9	14	53	45	+8	35	Qualification for the UEFA Cup first round
6	Dundee	36	14	7	15	45	51	−6	35	
7	St Mirren	36	13	5	18	42	63	−21	31	
8	Hibernian	36	11	6	19	49	63	−14	28	
9	Motherwell	36	7	6	23	33	66	−33	20	
10	Clydebank	36	6	8	22	29	77	−48	20	

Source: Rsssf
Rules for classification: 1) points; 2) goal difference; 3) number of goals scored.
(C) Champions

== Results ==
=== Matches 1–18 ===
During matches 1–18 each team plays every other team twice (home and away).

Home \ Away	ABE	CEL	CLY	DND	DNU	HOM	HIB	MOT	RAN	STM
Aberdeen		4–1	3–1	4–1	3–2	3–0	3–0	1–1	1–0	1–1
Celtic	2–1		2–0	2–1	0–3	0–1	1–1	2–1	1–1	2–0
Clydebank	2–1	0–2		4–0	1–2	1–0	2–4	1–1	0–1	1–1
Dundee	1–3	0–2	2–0		0–3	1–1	1–0	3–1	3–2	2–1
Dundee United	1–1	1–0	2–1	2–0		1–1	2–2	3–0	1–1	5–0
Heart of Midlothian	1–0	1–1	4–1	1–1	2–0		2–1	3–0	3–0	3–0
Hibernian	1–1	0–5	5–0	2–1	0–1	0–0		1–0	1–3	2–3
Motherwell	1–1	1–2	0–0	1–3	0–1	2–1	2–0		0–3	3–1
Rangers	0–3	3–0	0–0	0–1	1–0	3–1	1–2	1–0		3–0
St Mirren	1–0	1–2	0–2	1–0	1–0	6–2	1–3	4–1	2–1	

Source: Rsssf
Legend: Blue = home team win; Yellow = draw; Red = away team win.

=== Matches 19–36 ===
During matches 19–36 each team plays every other team twice (home and away).

Home \ Away	ABE	CEL	CLY	DND	DNU	HOM	HIB	MOT	RAN	STM
Aberdeen		0–1	4–1	0–0	0–1	0–1	4–0	3–2	1–1	3–1
Celtic	1–1		2–0	2–1	1–1	1–1	2–0	3–2	2–0	1–1
Clydebank	0–6	0–5		0–0	1–1	1–1	1–3	1–1	2–1	0–2
Dundee	0–0	1–3	4–0		0–1	2–0	3–1	4–0	2–1	3–1
Dundee United	2–1	4–2	4–0	0–0		0–3	4–0	4–0	1–1	1–2
Heart of Midlothian	1–1	1–1	1–0	3–1	1–1		3–1	2–0	3–1	3–0
Hibernian	0–1	2–2	2–3	1–0	1–2	1–2		4–0	1–1	3–0
Motherwell	0–1	0–2	3–0	2–2	2–0	1–3	3–1		1–0	1–2
Rangers	1–1	4–4	4–2	5–0	1–1	0–2	3–1	2–0		2–0
St Mirren	1–1	0–5	3–0	1–2	1–1	0–1	0–2	1–0	2–1	

Source: Rsssf
Legend: Blue = home team win; Yellow = draw; Red = away team win.

== Awards ==
Award	Winner	Club
PFA Players' Player of the Year	(Scotland) Richard Gough	Dundee United
PFA Young Player of the Year	(Scotland) Craig Levein	Heart of Midlothian
SFWA Footballer of the Year	(Scotland) Sandy Jardine	Heart of Midlothian
