= Colla =

Colla may refer to:

== People ==
- Colla people or Qulla, indigenous people of Argentina, Bolivia, and Chile
- Colla (demonym), a demonym within Bolivia for inhabitants of the western part of the country

=== Given name ===
- Colla mac Báirid (died 932), King of Limerick
- Colla MacDonnell (died 1558), Scottish noble
- Colla mac Fergusso (died 786), possible King of Connacht
- Colla Swart (born 1930), South African photographer
- The Three Collas, legendary fourth-century High Kings of Ireland

=== Surname ===
- Colla (surname)

== Places ==
- Colla (Thrace), a settlement of ancient Thrace, now in Turkey
- Colla, Bordj Bou Arreridj, Algeria
- Colla Kingdom, an Andean civilization
- La Collá, a parish of Siero, Asturias, Spain
- Val Colla, a valley in Switzerland
- Valcolla, a municipality in the canton of Ticino, Switzerland

== Other uses ==
- Colla (moth), a moth genus
