= Coll (surname) =

Coll is a surname and may refer to:

- Anthony Coll (1861–1931), Jamaican chief justice
- Antonio Coll (born 1959), Spanish cyclist
- Antonio Martín y Coll, Spanish musician of the 18th century
- Aristide Cavaillé-Coll (1811–1899), French organ builder
- Awa Marie Coll-Seck (born 1951), Senegalese infectious diseases specialist and politician
- Cata Coll (born 2001), Spanish football goalkeeper
- Cayetano Coll y Cuchí (1881–1961), Puerto Rican activist
- Cayetano Coll y Toste (1850–1930), Puerto Rican historian and writer
- Catherine Coll (1856–1932), Mother of Éamon de Valera
- César Coll Carabias (born 1947), Mexican politician
- Cynthia García Coll, Puerto Rican developmental psychologist
- Daniel Coll (born 1961), British actor
- Demetrio Carceller Coll (1929–2023), Portuguese billionaire heir and businessman
- Edna Coll (1906–2002), Puerto Rican educator and author
- Elizabeth Esteve-Coll (1938–2024), British academic and museum director
- Francisco Coll García (born 1985), Spanish composer
- Francisco Coll Guitart, Spanish Dominican priest and saint 1812–1875)
- Fulgencio Coll Bucher (born 1948), Spanish general
- Hugo Zepeda Coll (born 1936), Chilean lawyer, theologian and politician
- Ignacio Coll Riudavets (born 1987), Spanish tennis player
- Isabel Cuchí Coll (1904–1993), Puerto Rican journalist and writer
- Israel Coll (born 1993), Argentine footballer
- Ivonne Coll (born 1947), Puerto Rican actress
- John Coll (died 2014), British information technology specialist
- José Coll y Cuchí (1877–1960), Puerto Rican politician and independence advocate
- Jorge Coll (born 1977/8), Spanish art dealer
- Jorge Coll (handballer) (born 1968), Cuban handball coach
- Joseph Clement Coll (1881–1921), American book and newspaper illustrator
- Julio Coll (1919–1993), Spanish screenwriter
- Leandro Coll (1895–1975), Spanish rower
- Liam Coll (born 1929), Irish soccer player
- Lluís Coll (1937–2008), Spanish footballer
- Mad Dog Coll (Uinseann Ó Colla or Vincent Coll, 1908–1932), American mobster
- Mar Coll (born 1981), Spanish filmmaker
- Marcos Coll (1935–2017), Colombian footballer
- Mario Coll (born 1960), Colombian footballer
- Marta Balletbò-Coll (born 1960), Spanish film producer and screenwriter
- Martin Coll, Irish Gaelic footballer
- Max Coll (1932–2014), American politician from New Mexico
- Mercè Durfort i Coll (1943–2022), Spanish biologist and professor
- Mickey Coll (1951–1972), Puerto Rican basketball player
- Nele Coll (born 1996), Belgian squash player
- Niall Coll (born 1963), Irish Catholic bishop
- Óscar Coll (1928–2001), Argentine footballer
- Owen Coll (born 1976), Irish footballer
- Patricio Coll, Argentine film director
- Patrick Coll (1839–1917), Irish lawyer
- Pau Faner Coll (born 1949), Spanish novelist and painter
- Paul Coll (born 1992), New Zealand squash player
- Pep Coll (Josep Coll i Martí, born 1949, Spanish writer
- Pilar Coll (1929–2012), Spanish lawyer and activist
- Ramón Coll Jaumet (died 1984), Costa Rican sports administrator
- Robert Coll (born 1934), American police chief in Pittsburgh
- Roberto Coll (1925−2013), Argentine footballer
- Ryan Coll (born 2001), American football player
- Salvador Cristau Coll (born 1950), Spanish Catholic prelate
- Sofia Coll (born 1999), Spanish actress, dancer, and singer
- Steve Coll (born 1958), American journalist
- Silvia Carreño-Coll (born 1963), Dominican-American judge
- Tony Coll (1952–2020), New Zealand rugby league footballer and coach
- Xavier Coll, Spanish classical guitarist

== See also ==
- Colle (surname)
- Cole (surname)
- MacColl
- McColl (surname)
