= McColl (surname) =

McColl is a surname of Irish and Scottish origin. It is shared by several notable people and fictional characters:

- Beth McColl (born 1993), English writer and podcaster
- Bill McColl (1930–2023), former American football (NFL) player
- Billy McColl (footballer), Scottish footballer
- Colin McColl (born 1932), KCMG, former head of the British Secret Intelligence Service
- Hugh McColl (born 1935), Fourth generation American banker, influential in evolution of the banking industry
- Ian McColl (1927–2008), Scottish international footballer and manager
- James McColl (disambiguation)
  - James McColl (musician) (fl. 1990), Scottish frontman for the British band The Supernaturals
  - James McColl (politician) (1844–1929)
  - Jim McColl (born 1951), Scottish businessman
  - Jimmy McColl (footballer born 1892), Scottish footballer (Celtic FC, Stoke City FC, Hibernian FC)
  - Jimmy McColl (Olympic footballer), Scottish footballer
- John B. McColl (Canadian politician) (1861–1940), Canadian national political figure
- John McColl (British Army officer) (born 1952), KCB, CBE, DSO, Deputy Supreme Allied Commander Europe
- John McColl (politician) (fl. 1915), Canadian (Alberta) political figure
- Milt McColl (born 1959), former American football (NFL) player
- Pamela McColl, Canadian publisher and campaigner
- Peter McColl (born 1980), Former Rector of the University of Edinburgh
- Robert Smyth McColl (1876–1959), Scottish footballer and founder of the RS McColl newsagent chain
- William McColl (disambiguation)
  - William McColl (clarinetist)
  - William McColl (footballer) (1865 – after 1895), Scottish international footballer

== Fictional characters ==
- Mitch McColl, character on the Australian soap opera Home and Away.

== History and Origin ==
Anglicized version of the Gaelic patronym Mac Colla (formerly Conla(e)) which was used by three brothers who were said to be the fabled forefathers of the monarchs of mid-Ulster. 'Great chief' or 'son of the battle chief' has been suggested as a possible meaning for the name. Because the surname was occasionally pronounced with a terminal fricative sound like Mac Collach, there seems to have been some confusion with McCullough historically.

The surname was first discovered in the Strathclyde region of Scotland, which is now part of the Council Area of Argyll and Bute, in Argyllshire, where they held a family seat from early times and their first records appeared on the census rolls taken by the early Kings of Britain to determine the rate of taxation of their subjects.

== See also ==
- MacColl
