= Colla (surname) =

Colla is a surname, and may refer to:

- Alejandro Colla (born 1970), Argentine sailor
- Ángel Colla (born 1973), Argentine cyclist
- Carrie Colla, American health economist
- Claudia Colla (died 1611), Italian ducal mistress and alleged witch
- Connie Colla, American television news anchor and host
- Daniel Colla (born 1964), Argentine volleyball player
- Domenico Colla, 18th-century Italian musician
- Elliott Colla, American Arabist scholar
- Enrique Colla (born c.1890), Argentine footballer
- Giuseppe Colla (1731–1806), Italian composer
- Johnny Colla (born 1952), American musician
- Luigi Aloysius Colla (1766–1848), Piemontese lawyer, politician and botanist
- Nicholas Colla (born 1986), Australian actor, writer and director
- Richard A. Colla (1936–2021), American film director
- Sheila Colla (1982–2025), Canadian entomologist and conservationist
- Stefano La Colla, Italian tenor
- Ullco Colla (died 1531), Incan insurgent

== See also ==
- Collas
- Colle (surname)
- Coll (surname)
- Alasdair Mac Colla (c.1610–1647), Scottish military officer
- Fionn MacColla (1906–1975), Scottish novelist
