= McColl =

McColl may refer to:

- McColl, South Carolina
- McColl Center for Art + Innovation, an artist residency and contemporary art space in Charlotte, North Carolina.
- McColl (surname)
- McColl (superfund site), a US Environmental Protection Agency Superfund site in California.
- McColl's, a defunct British convenience store chain

== See also ==
- MacColl
