= Collas =

Collas is a surname. Notable people with this surname include:

- Achille Collas (1795–1859), French engineer, inventor, writer and engraver
- Berni Collas (1954–2010), Belgian politician
- J. P. Collas (John Peter Collas; 1911–1984), British philologist
- Jean Collas (1874–1928), French rugby union player
- John von Collas (1678–1753), French architect
- Louis Antoine Collas (1775–1829), French painter
- Philippe Collas, French writer and scriptwriter
- Richard Collas (born 1953), Bailiff of Guernsey
- Silvia Collas (born 1974), Bulgarian-French chess player
