= The Rotunda (New York City) =

Former art gallery in City Hall Park in Manhattan, New York

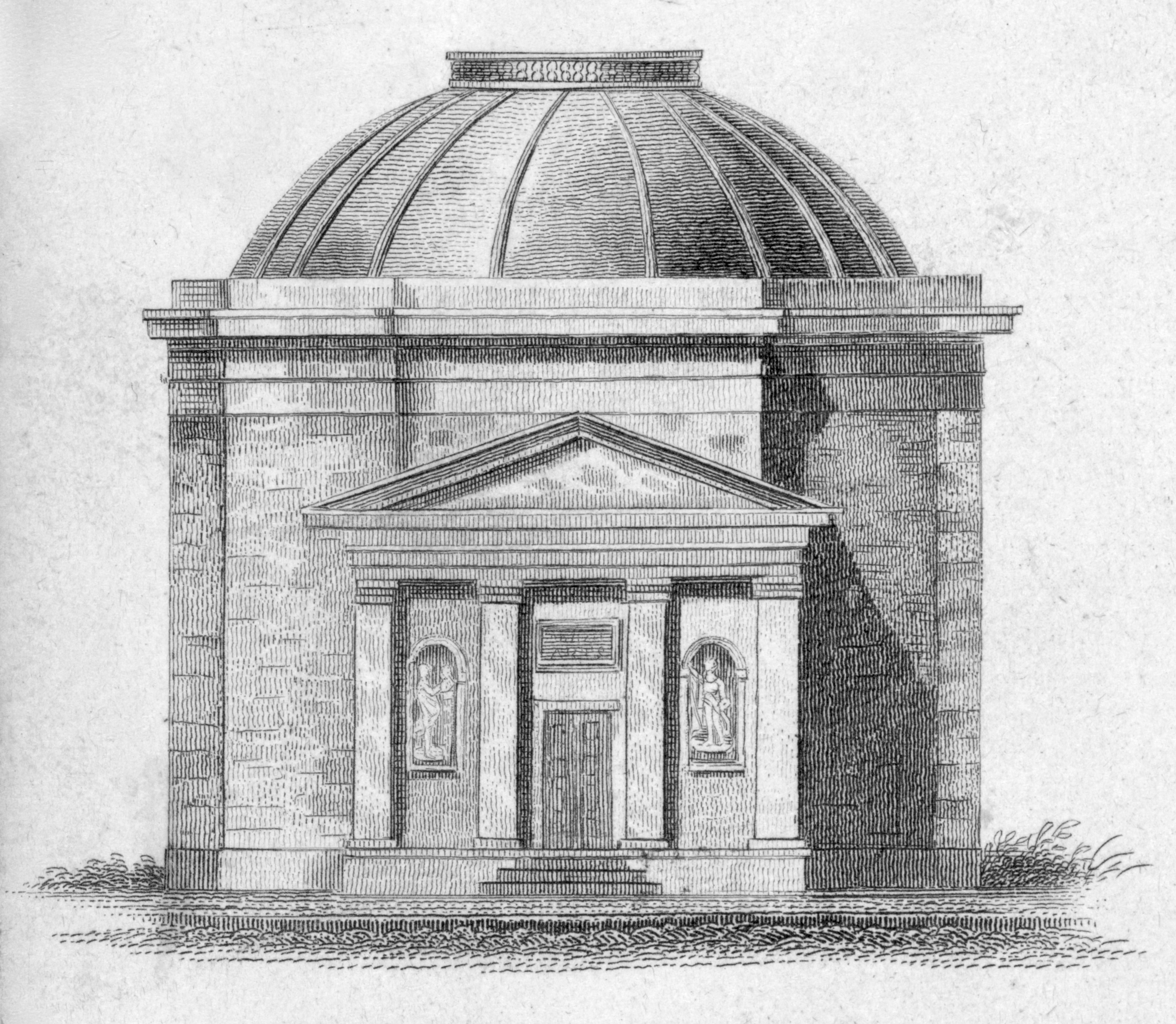
- Drawing c. 1829 by Alexander Jackson Davis
- Interactive map of the The Rotunda area

General information
- Location: Manhattan, New York City
- Coordinates: 40°42′47″N 74°00′17″W
- Groundbreaking: April 1818
- Opened: October 1818
- Demolished: 1870

The Rotunda was a building that stood in City Hall Park in Lower Manhattan, New York City, from 1818 to 1870. Originally built as an art gallery to display panoramic paintings, the building was later used for a variety of other purposes, including as a courthouse, a naturalization office, a post office, and the offices of government agencies. The Rotunda was also the site of the founding meetings of the Century Association and American Society of Civil Engineers in 1847 and 1852, respectively.

== History ==
The Rotunda was built at the initiative of American artist John Vanderlyn to display panoramic paintings. Historians, Edwin G. Burrows and Mike Wallace, note that Vanderlyn was motivated by the refusal of the city's cultural elite to exhibit works such as his nude Ariadne Asleep on the Island of Naxos, which they deemed an affront to public decency. Backed by John Jacob Astor and other wealthy New Yorkers, he built the Rotunda. Widely regarded as the city's first art museum, it operated on a commercial footing.

The building was designed on the model of The Pantheon in Rome. It was fifty-six feet (17 m) in diameter, crowned with a thirty-foot (9.1 m) dome. Vanderlyn obtained a nine-year lease for the site from the Common Council for peppercorn rent, with the lot and the building erected upon it to be returned back to the city when the lease expired, although he was given an assurance by Mayor Jacob Radcliff that the lease would be renewed by the Common Council if the Rotunda met "public expectation." Groundbreaking for the building took place in April 1818.

The Rotunda opened in 1818 and was intended to display Vanderlyn's Panoramic View of the Palace and Gardens of Versailles, a cyclorama now on display in a purpose-built, circular room in the American Wing of the Metropolitan Museum of Art, in New York City. In the painting, to the right of the Latona Fountain, Vanderlyn painted himself pointing towards Czar Alexander I of Russia and King Frederick William III of Prussia. Vanderlyn's Versailles was displayed at the Rotunda beginning on June 29, 1819. Before his painting was completed and ready for public viewing, Vanderlyn obtained other panoramas to put on display, including View of the Interior of the City of Paris by Thomas Barker, Attack of the Allied Forces on Paris March 30, 1814 by Henry Aston Barker, and Battle of Lodi by Robert Ker Porter. The first exhibit at the building, Barker's panorama of Paris, opened to the public in October 1818.

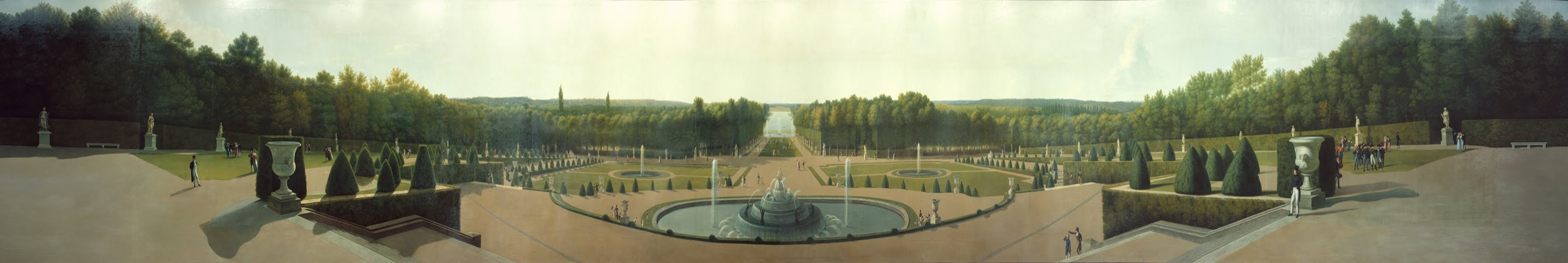
Panoramic View of the Palace and Gardens of Versailles (1818-19), Metropolitan Museum of Art, New York City

In August 1819, just two months after Versailles was put on display, Vanderlyn was in debt and the Rotunda's Board of Trustees rented out rooms in the building to four artists—including Louis Antoine Collas, Ralph Earl and John Rubens Smith—who lived there until 1820. Vanderlyn's Versailles was displayed at the Rotunda until the fall of 1820. Other panoramas subsequently displayed in the building included the View of Athens (loaned by Harvard College) and the View of the City of Mexico by Robert Burford.

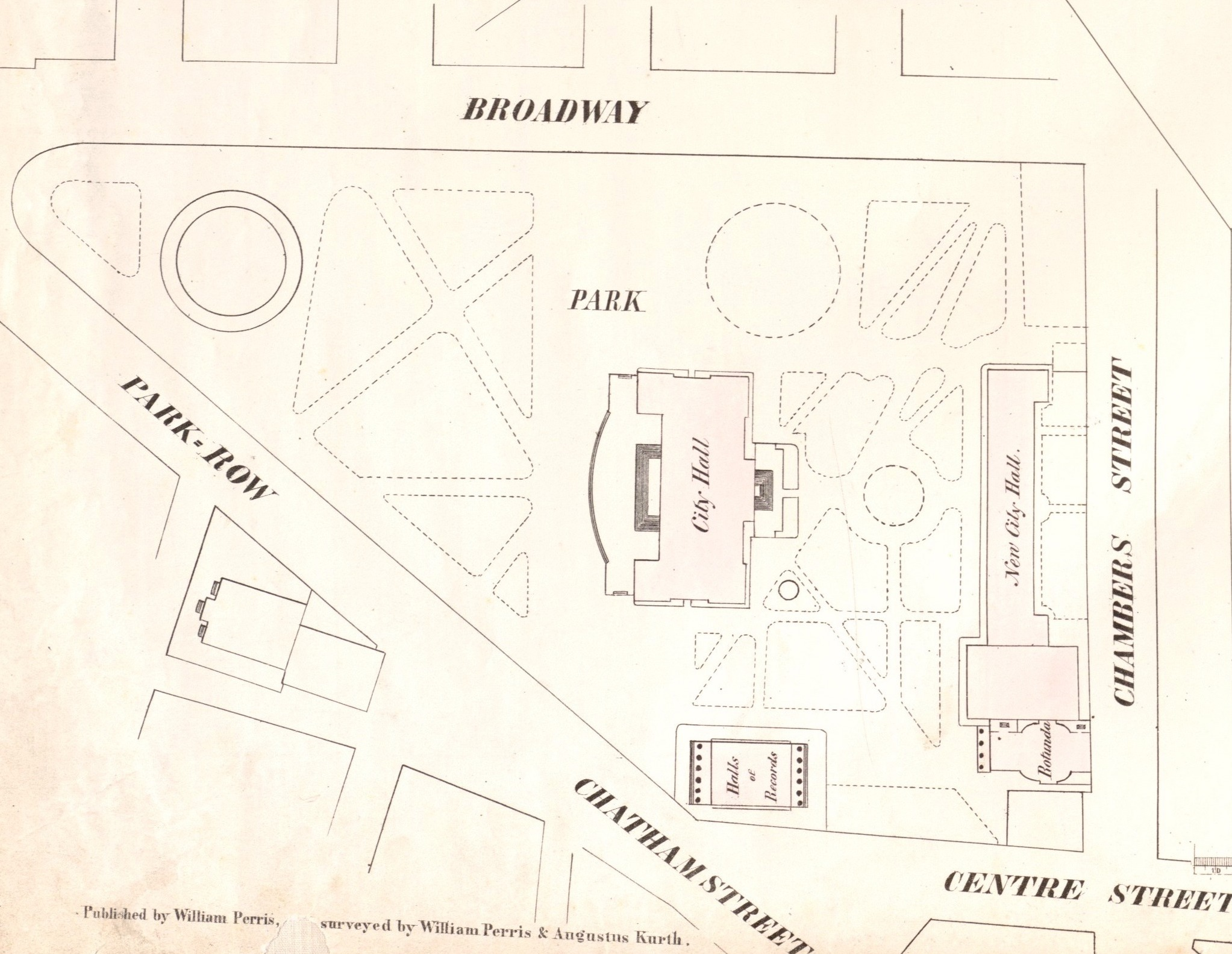
1853 map of City Hall Park with the Rotunda at bottom right, after additions were made to the building

Vanderlyn's request to renew the initial lease was rejected by the city, which ultimately took over the Rotunda in September 1829 and converted the building into a courthouse. The Rotunda was first used by the Court of Sessions and later by the Marine Court. It then became a naturalization office in 1834. After Great Fire of New York in 1835 burned down the post office located in the basement of the Merchants' Exchange on Wall Street, the city offered the Rotunda to the federal government as a replacement. The post office remained at the Rotunda until February 1845, when it was relocated to the Middle Dutch Church on Nassau Street.

From July 1845 until June 1848, the Rotunda was occupied by the New York Gallery of Fine Arts, which displayed the art collection formerly held by Luman Reed. When the institution was later dissolved in 1858, its art collection was transferred to the New-York Historical Society. On January 13, 1847, while the New York Gallery of Fine Arts was housed in the Rotunda, the building was the site of the founding meeting of the Century Association.

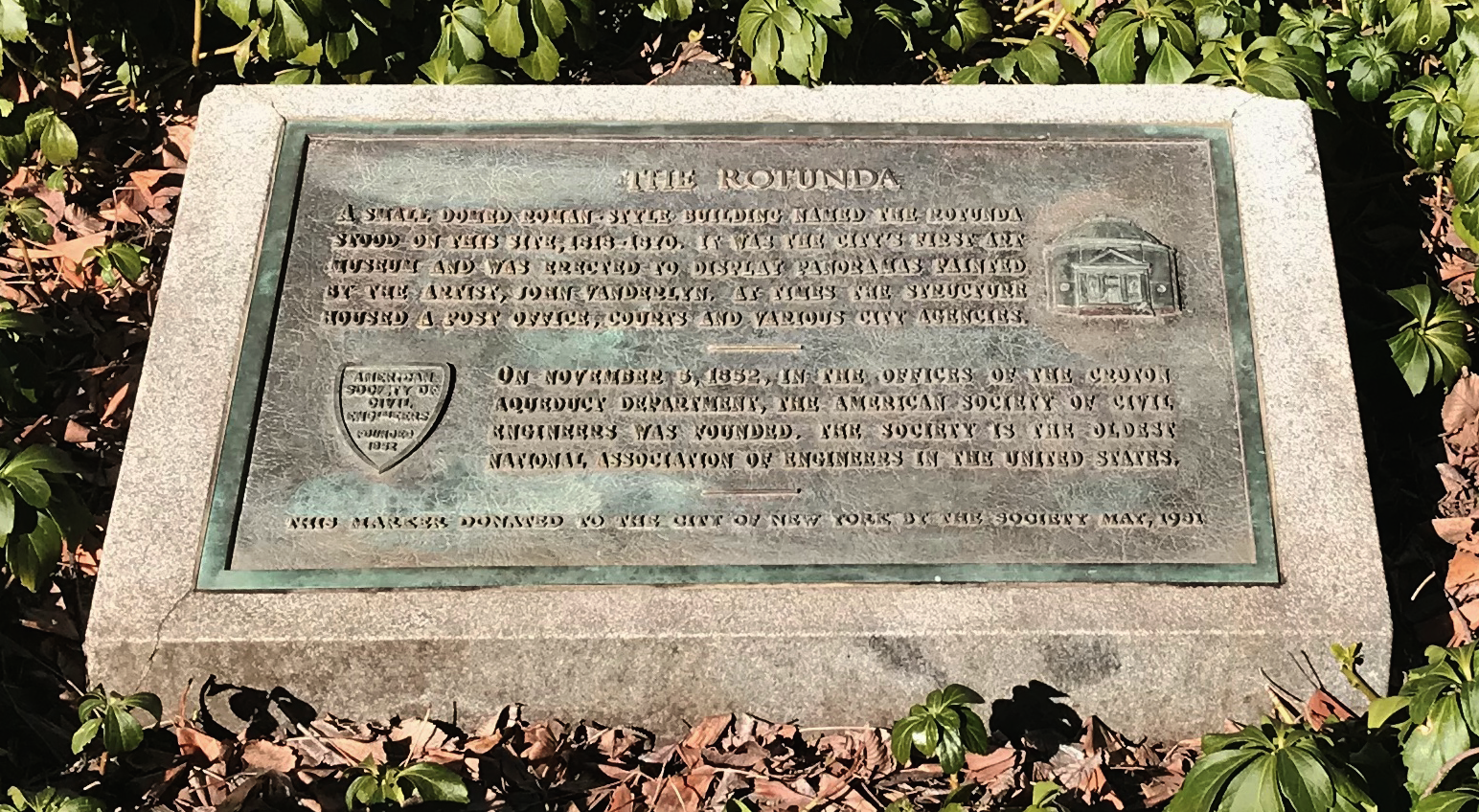
Plaque donated to the City of NEW YORK BY ASCE in MAY 1981

In time the Rotunda's use changed again to housing government agencies, and the building was altered accordingly; modifications included two-story additions to the north and south sides of the building, with the latter including a portico with four Doric columns. After the building was renovated, the Alms House Commissioner moved from City Hall into the lower floor of the Rotunda and the Croton Aqueduct Board occupied the upper floor. The Croton Aqueduct Board was succeeded by the Croton Aqueduct Department in 1849, and Alfred W. Craven was appointed as the chief engineer of the department. On November 5, 1852, in the offices of the Croton Aqueduct Department, the American Society of Civil Engineers and Architects was founded at a meeting chaired by Craven. The civil engineering society held meetings at this location from 1853 to 1855. The Croton Aqueduct Department and other municipal offices occupied the building for a period of twenty years.

The Rotunda was demolished in 1870 as part of a renovation of City Hall Park. Today, a bronze plaque inside the park near the intersection of Chambers and Centre streets marks the former site of the building.
