= Collé =

Collé is a surname. Notable people with the surname include:

- Charles Collé (1709–1783), French dramatist
- Henri Collé (1893–1976), Swiss cyclist
- Ronald Collé (born 1946), American physicist

== See also ==
- Colle (surname)
