= Louisa C. Martin, née Strobel =

American painter

Louisa C. Strobel
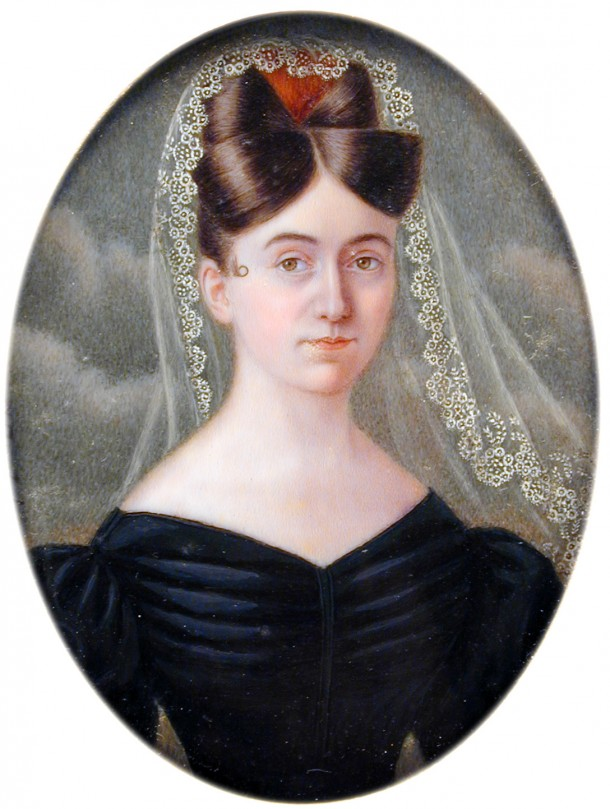
- Self-portrait, c. 1830
- Born: 1806; Liverpool
- Died: 1883 (aged 76–77)

Louisa C. Martin, née Strobel (1806–1883) was an American painter of portrait miniatures.

She was the daughter of a US diplomat and was born in Liverpool while her father Daniel Strobel was assigned there. On the outbreak of the War of 1812 the family returned to the United States, only to leave a few years later for Bordeaux, where they stayed until 1830. It is in Bordeaux that Louisa Strobel was taught to paint, though it is unknown who her teacher was. Her style is reminiscent of the work of the Franco-American miniature painter Louis Antoine Collas, but there is no evidence they ever met. The museum in Bordeaux has many similar miniature portraits by anonymous painters, so it is possible there was a school there of some sort. Like many well-to-do young women painters of her time, she was not commercially active and her works were kept in the family.

According to her "memorial" written by Samuel D. Burchard for the Proceedings of the Twenty-First Convocation of the University of the State of New York (held July 10, 11 and 12, 1883) on the request of her son, Daniel Strobel Martin, she lived in Liverpool next door to the Gladstone family and played with the older brother of the later prime minister William Ewart Gladstone. During her time in France she learned French and became acquainted with French literature and the arts. After returning to the US, her father became deputy collector in the Custom House. In January 1831 he wrote a report with recommendations on the consular service of the United States that is seen as a valuable source that gives insight into the history of US foreign relations. After her father died in 1839 Louisa married the ten-year-younger Benjamin Nicholas Martin who was a divinity student she met in New Haven, Connecticut. He became a clergyman and she travelled with him to Massachusetts and Albany, before settling in New York City where he became professor of philosophy at the University of the State of New York. It is believed that she stopped painting after marriage.

Her works are held in the Metropolitan Museum of Art, donated by her grand-niece Ella Church Strobell, and the Gibbes Museum of Art (Carolina Art Association), donated by her son. The Metropolitan also has miniature portraits by John Vanderlyn of her parents. These were painted before Louisa was born and she would have been familiar with them all her life. They were possibly her initial inspiration to become an artist.

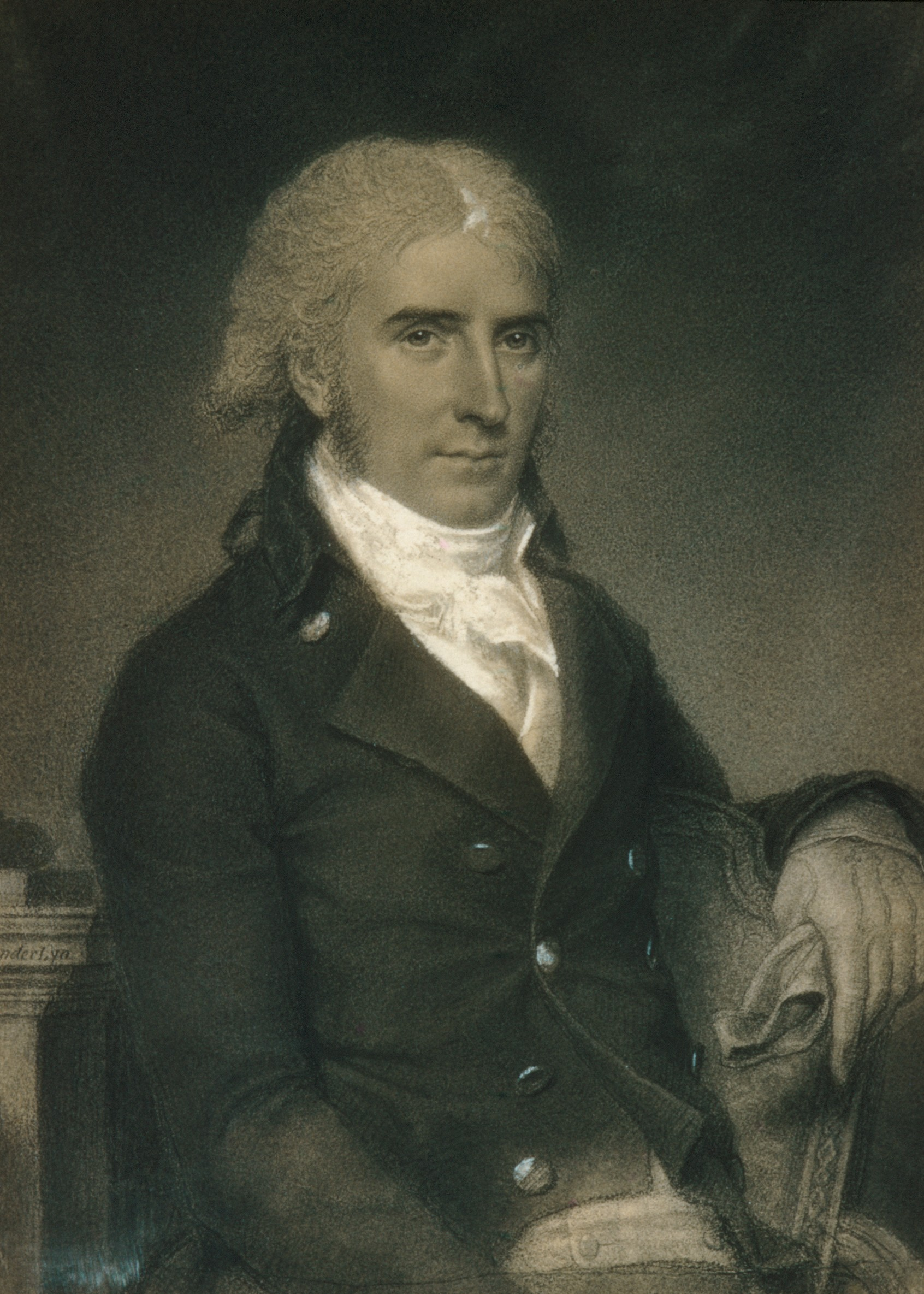
Portrait of her father, Daniel Strobel

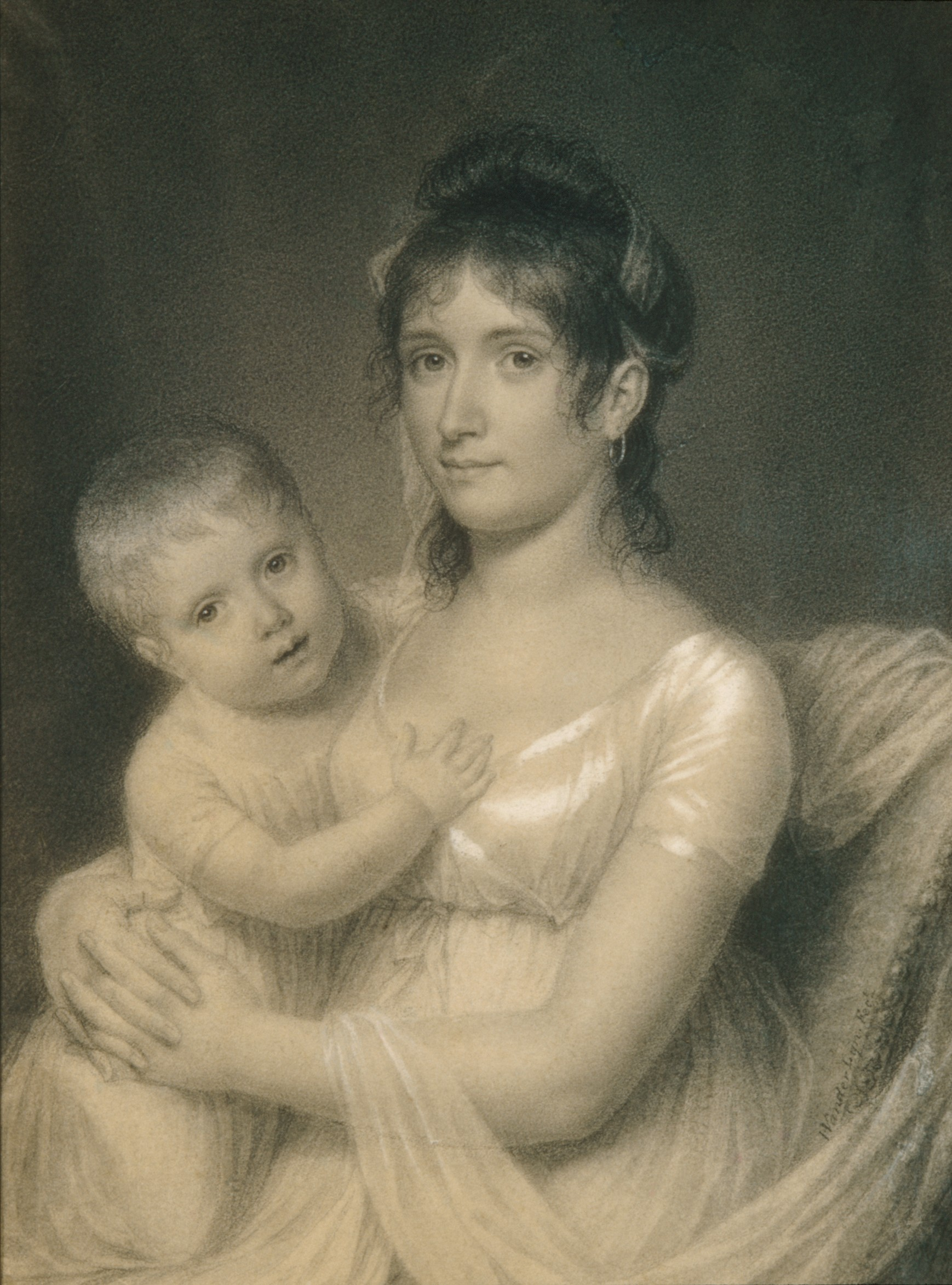
Portrait of her mother with her brother George on her lap
