= James McColl =

James or Jimmy Jim McColl or MacColl may refer to:

- James McColl (musician), Scottish musician
- James McColl (politician) (1844–1929), Australian politician
- Jimmy McColl (footballer, born 1892) (1892–1978), Scottish footballer
- Jimmy McColl (footballer, born 1924) (1924–2013), Scottish footballer
- Jim McColl (footballer) (1933–2013), Australian rules footballer
- Jim McColl (born 1951), Scottish businessman
- James MacColl (1908–1971), British politician
- Jim McColl (1935–2024), presenter of the gardening programme The Beechgrove Garden
