= Colle (surname) =

Colle is a surname. Notable people with the surname include:

- Edgard Colle (1897–1932), Belgian chess master
- Florence Colle (born 1965), French athlete
- Josh Colle (born 1972/3), Canadian politician
- Michael Colle (born 1945), Canadian politician from Toronto
- Michael Dal Colle (born 1996), Canadian ice hockey player
- Michel-Auguste Colle (1872–1949), French painter of the Nancy school
- William Colle (fl.1397–1414), English politician

== See also ==
- Colle (disambiguation)
- Collé
- Coll (surname)
- Colla (surname)
- Colli (surname)
- Del Colle
- Calle (name)
