= Katharine Foot =

American zoologist and cytologist

Katherine Foot
- Born: 1852; Geneva, New York
- Died: 1944 (aged 91–92)
- Scientific career
- Fields: zoology, cytology

Katharine Foot (October 14, 1852 – 1944) was an American zoologist and cytologist who conducted research with her laboratory partner, Ella Church Strobell. They were known for their advances in developing new techniques for making microscope samples and for taking micrographs of cells.

== Biography ==
Foot was born in Geneva, New York in 1852. The first edition of American Men of Science described her being educated through private schools while growing up. Foot was a member of the New York Women's club Sorosis. The Advancement of Women club was organized under Sorosis and included the prominent member Alice Fletcher, the American Indian ethnographer. Foot was interested in Native American culture, and became president of the Washington auxiliary of the Women's National Indian Association, an organization that lobbied on behalf of Native Americans, in the mid 1800s. She accompanied Fletcher on a trip to Alaska to study native culture in the area. However, their opportunities for communicating with Native American communities did not work out as planned. In the 1890s Foot became a resident of Evanston, Illinois where she resided with Orrington Lunt, a Chicago business man, who was a founder of Northwestern University. At age 40, she received training at the Marine Biological Laboratory in Woods Hole, Massachusetts.

Thomas Hunt Morgan considered her a significant contributor to the emerging field of genetics and, in 1906, she was included in the list of 1,000 most important scientists in the United States in American Men of Science.

Foot lived in London for a period in the 1930s, but moved to the United States by the time of the Second World War. She died in 1944, and her last address showed her residing in Camden, South Carolina.

== Career ==
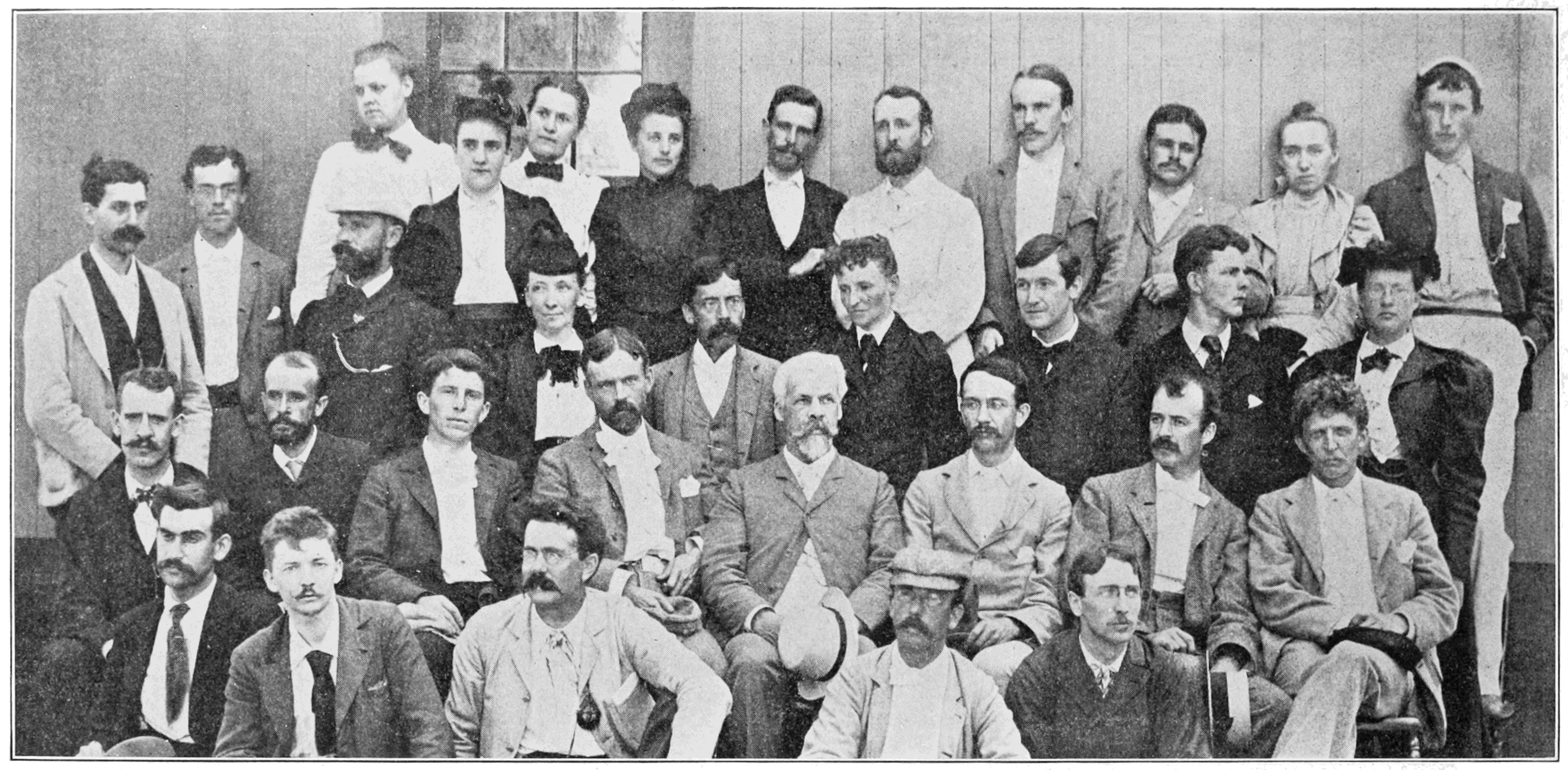
Group photo of researchers of the Marine Biology Laboratory in Woods Hole, Massachusetts. Third row, standing (left to right): - —(?), Pierre A. Fish, Cornelia M. Clapp, Sho Wakase, Katharine Foot, A. D. Morrill, Joseph C. Thompson (?), Esther F. Byrnes.

In 1892, after her first six weeks in a course on invertebrates in Woods Hole, Charles Ottis Whitman delegated Foot to work on the maturation and fertilization of the egg of the earthworm, Allolobophora foetida. She wrote a paper on the subject that appeared in the Journal of Morphology in 1894. In 1896, she became the first woman to give a lecture at the Woods Hole Laboratory. Her lecture was titled "The centrosomes of the fertilized egg of Allolobophora foetida".

Ella Strobell began working as Foot's assistant in 1897. In 1899, Strobell's name began coauthoring papers with Foot. Foot and Strobell were among the first to photograph the development stages of fertilized eggs and together researched the role of chromosomes in hereditary, sex-linked characteristics. Additionally, they developed a technique for creating samples at low temperatures for viewing under the microscope.

Between 1906 and 1913, Foot and Strobell researched certain stages of chromosomal development of squash bugs. This was believed to be done in a Laboratory of their own in New York City. Foot and Strobell participated in debates on the role of chromosomes in transmitting definite units of hereditary information such as sex-linked characteristics. They defended their position against T.H. Morgan. In 1914, Foot and Strobell traveled to England to continue their research under Harry Eltringham of New College Oxford. Their research stopped in 1917 when Strobell became ill.

By the end of the First World War, Foot went on to volunteer for the American Red Cross in Paris. She researched the life cycle of the louse, Pediculus vestimenti, to develop a method of control.

== Bibliography ==
1. Preliminary Note on the Maturation and Fertilization of the Egg of Allolobophora Foetida J. Morphol. Foot, 1894
2. The Centrosomes of the Fertilization egg of Allolobophora Foetida. Wood's Holl Mar. Bio. Lab. Lect. Foot, 1896-1897
3. Centrosome and Archoplasm. Science. Foot, 1897
4. Yolk-nucleus and Polar Rings J. Morphol. Foot, 1896
5. The Origin of the Cleavage Centrosomes J. Morphol. Foot, 1897
6. The Cocoons and Eggs of Allolobophora Foetida J. Morphol. Foot, 1898
7. Further Notes on the Egg of Allolobophora foetida Foot and Strobell, 1898
8. A New Method Of Focusing In Photomicrography Foot and Strobell, 1901
9. Further Notes on the Cocoons of Allolobophora foetida Foot and Strobell, 1902
10. Sectioning Paraffine at a Temperature of 25°F Foot and Strobell, 1905
11. The "Accessory Chromosome" of Anasa Tristis Foot and Strobell, 1907
12. The Nucleoli in the Spermatocytes and Germinal Vesicles of Euschistus variolarius Foot and Strobell, 1909
13. Preliminary Note on the Results of Crossing Two Hemipterous Species with Reference to the Inheritance of an Exclusively Male Character and Its Bearing on Modern Chromosome Theories Foot and Strobell, 1913
14. Preliminary Report of Crossing Two Hemipterous Species, with Reference to the Inheritance of a Second Exclusively Male Character Foot and Strobell, 1914
15. Results of Crossing Euschistus Variolarius and Euschistus Ictericus with Reference to the Inheritance of Two Exclusively Male Characters Foot and Strobell, 1917
16. Determination of the Sex of the Offspring from a Single Pair of Pediculus Vestimenti Foot, 1919
17. Preliminary Note on the Spermatogenesis of Pediculus Vestimenti Foot, 1919
18. Notes on Pediculus Vestimenti Foot, 1920

== See also ==
- Timeline of women in science
