= William McColl =

William, Willie, Bill or Billy McColl or MacColl may refer to:

- Bill McColl (1930–2023), American football player and politician
- Billy McColl (footballer), 1970s footballer (Clydebank F.C.)
- Billy McColl (actor) (1951–2014), Scottish actor
- William McColl (clarinetist) (1933–2024), American clarinetist
- William McColl (footballer) (1865–1903), Scottish 1890s footballer
