= Alfred W. Craven =

Alfred Wingate Craven
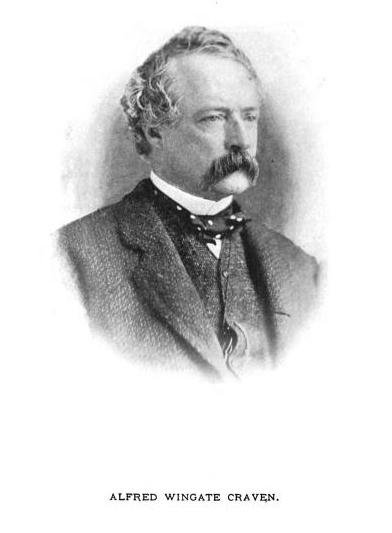
- Born: 20 October 1810; Washington, D.C., United States
- Died: 27 March 1879 (aged 68); Chiswick, England
- Burial place: Green-Wood Cemetery, Brooklyn, New York
- Education: Columbia University (A.B.)
- Spouse: Maria Schermerhorn (m. 1840; died 1864)

Alfred Wingate Craven (20 October 1810 – 27 March 1879) was a chief engineer of the Croton Aqueduct Department, was a founding member—and host of its initial meeting—of the American Society of Civil Engineers and Architects, which later became the American Society of Civil Engineers (ASCE).

== Biography ==
He was born on 20 October 1810 in Washington, D.C. at the Washington Navy Yard, where his father and maternal grandfather were assigned by the United States Navy. His father was reassigned to Portsmouth, New Hampshire in 1813, where Alfred studied at the Phillips Exeter Academy, the Berwick Academy and then the American Literary, Scientific, and Military Academy from 1824 until September 1825. He graduated from Columbia University with an A.B. degree in 1829, studied law and then civil engineering.

In 1837 he was associated with General George S. Greene on professional work near Charleston and elsewhere. He was a railroad engineer and manager, and rapidly rose to the first rank in his profession.

Craven became engineer commissioner to the Croton Water Board of New York on its organization in 1849, and continued in that capacity until 1868. Among the many works projected and carried out during these years under his supervision were the building of the large reservoir in Central Park, the enlargement of pipes across High Bridge, and the construction of the reservoir in Boyd's Corners, Putnam County. He also caused to be made an accurate survey of Croton River valley, with a view of ascertaining its capacity for furnishing an adequate water supply, and was largely instrumental in securing the passage of the first law establishing a general sewerage system for New York City.

Later he was associated with Allan Campbell as a commissioner in the work of building the underground railway extending along 4th Avenue from the Grand Central Depot to Harlem River.

He was one of the original members of the American Society of Civil Engineers (ASCE), a director for many years, and its president from November 1869, until November 1871. Craven was the host of the initial meeting when ASCE was established on November 5, 1852 at the offices of the Croton Aqueduct Department in the Rotunda.

He died on 27 March 1879 in Chiswick, England and was buried at Green-Wood Cemetery in Brooklyn, New York on 15 April 1879.

== Family ==
Craven married Maria Schermerhorn in 1840, who died in 1864. Two of his brothers were noted naval officers: Thomas Tingey Craven and Tunis Craven. Thomas Tingey Craven's son Alfred Craven (16 September 1846 – 30 September 1926), also an engineer, graduated from the United States Naval Academy in 1867 and worked on design for the New York City Subway. Another relative is John Craven, the former Chief Scientist of Polaris and the Special Projects Office.
