= Del Colle =

Del Colle or del Colle is a surname, and may refer to:

- Gherardo Del Colle (1920–1978), pseudonym, Italian priest, poet and journalist
- Giovanni Del Colle (born 1858), American composer
- Laura del Colle (born 1983), Argentine field hockey goalkeeper
- Raffaellino del Colle (1490–1566), Italian painter
- Renee del Colle (born 1967/8), Canadian wheelchair basketball player
- Ubaldo Maria Del Colle (1883–1958), Italian actor and film director

== See also ==
- Colle (surname)
