= Freeman Patterson =

Canadian photographer and writer

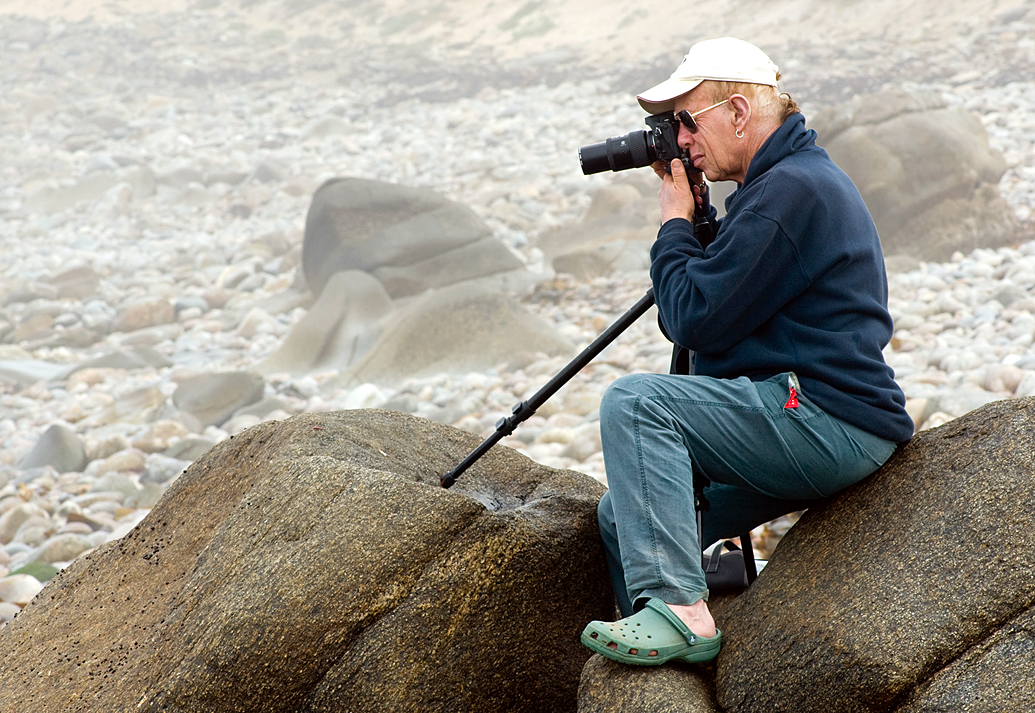
Freeman Patterson photographing in South Africa

Freeman Wilford Patterson CM ONB (born September 25, 1937) is a Canadian nature photographer and writer. He lives at Shamper's Bluff, New Brunswick. Patterson has authored several books on photographic techniques and theory, as well as on his nature photography.

== Life and work ==
Patterson was born at Long Reach, New Brunswick. He earned a B.A. from Acadia University and was granted a fellowship to study at Union Theological Seminary at Columbia University. While in New York, he studied photography and design. After completing three years there, he taught for three more years in Edmonton before finally deciding to pursue photography full-time.

Together with photographer and friend Colla Swart, he has hosted photographic workshops in Kamieskroon, Northern Cape, South Africa.

He lives at Shamper's Bluff, New Brunswick.

== Publications ==
=== Books on photographic techniques and theory by Patterson ===
- Photography for the Joy of It (1977, 2006)
- Photography and the Art of Seeing (1979, 2006)
- Photography of Natural Things (1982, 2006)
- ShadowLight: A Photographer's Life(1996)
- Photographing The World Around You(1994)

=== Books of nature photography by Patterson ===
- Namaqualand: Garden of the Gods (1984)
- Portraits of Earth (1987)
- In a Canadian Garden (1989)
- The Last Wilderness: Images of the Canadian Wild (1990)
- One Planet, One Man (1994)
- The Garden (2003)

=== Books of nature photography with one other ===
- Photo Impressionism and The Subjective Image (2001) – co-authored with Andre Gallant

== Awards and recognition ==
- Gold Medal for Photographic Excellence, from the National Film Board of Canada (1967)
- Elected member of the Royal Canadian Academy of Art (1975)
- Highest recognition (EFIAP) from the International Federation of Photographic Art (1975)
- Honorary fellowship (Hon. F.P.S.S.A.) in the Photographic Society of Southern Africa (1976)
- Gold Medal for Distinction in Photography, from the National Association for Photographic Art (1984)
- Member of the Order of Canada (1985)
- The Progress Medal, from the Photographic Society of America (1990)
- The Strathbutler Award (1997)
- The Lifetime Achievement Award from the North American Nature Photography Association (2001)
- Honorary fellowship in the Nature Photography Society of New Zealand (2004)
- Honorary Director of the North American Native Plant Society
- Member of the Order of New Brunswick (2013)
