= North American Native Plant Society =

- Official logo
- Founded: 1985
- Founder: James A French
- Type: Charity
- Registration no.: 130720824RR0001
- Purpose: Ecological Restoration
- Location: PO Box 84, Station D, Toronto, Ontario, M9A 4X1, Canada
- Region served: North America
- Key people: President: Vacant; Executive Director: Peter Kelly; Honorary Patron: Sir David AttenboroughCBE, FRS; Honorary Directors: Robert Bateman, The Right Honourable Adrienne Clarkson PC, CC, CMM, CD, Farley Mowat, Freeman Patterson, Carol Rykert, Dr. Adrian Forsythe, Glen Loates
- Volunteers: 400
- Website: nanps.org
- Formerly called: Canadian Wildflower Society
- Horticultural Member of Toronto Botanical Garden

The North American Native Plant Society (NANPS) is a volunteer-operated, registered charitable organization concerned with conserving native plants in wild areas and restoring indigenous flora to developed areas. It is noted for its work in educating business and the public about the benefits of using native plants, and its work in promoting native species through plant sales and seed exchanges has been credited with the resurgence of some species. It also maintains a list of local native plant societies across the United States and Canada. Encouraging the use of native plants helps safeguard traditional ecological knowledge, as numerous North American species have long served indigenous peoples for medicinal, cultural, and economic reasons. Using native plants can also increase biodiversity especially in suburban areas containing many non-native species.

== Current activities ==
NANPS is dedicated to the study, conservation, cultivation and restoration of North America's native flora. NANPS's key purpose is to provide information and to inspire an appreciation of native plants with an aim to restoring healthy ecosystems across the continent. To that end, NANPS currently:

- publishes a 16-page quarterly newsletter, The Blazing Star (ISSN 2291-8280), and an e-newsletter, The Local Scoop
- provides a forum for people interested in learning more about native plants
- creates information sheets, booklets and brochures on a variety of related topics
- manages two conservation properties in Ontario and works to restore ecosystems
- provides a native seed exchange available to NANPS members
- staffs information booths at a variety of public events
- offers guided excursions to natural areas
- operates Canada's largest native plant sale each May followed by a number of smaller sales from June to October
- maintains a searchable Native Plant Database, and a list of commercial growers who meet its ethical guidelines
- provides support to people adding native plants in urban/suburban areas
- creates and presents information to municipalities and interested groups on the benefits of native plants
- hosts a variety of seminars and workshops, culminating in an Annual General Meeting, plant sale, and awards presentation each October

== Logo ==
The logo was designed in 1994 by Beth McEachen. It is a woodcut portraying three native plants representing three transcontinental, native families, viz: Araceae, Orchidaceae, Iridaceae. The examples shown are an arum, a cypripedium and a blue-eyed grass.

== History ==
The logo of the Canadian Wildflower Society created by Pamela Meacher

NANPS was founded in 1985 by a small group of conservationists as the Canadian Wildflower Society. The name was later changed to the North American Native Plant Society to reflect a wider range of activities and broader membership. In 1985, the Society began publishing their well-received native plant magazine, Wildflower, under the editorship of James L. Hodgins.

In 1985 it also established a gardening Code of Ethics for its members. In 1986, it sponsored its first public annual native plant sale and filed a letters patent. In 1988, it sponsored its first native plant propagation workshop, and established wildflower gardens tour in Guelph and Waterloo, Ontario, Canada.

By 1993, it purchased a 50-acre Carolinian woodlot known as Shining Tree Woods near Cultus, Ontario, to conserve the nationally rare native cucumber tree, Magnolia acuminata. In 1994, the Canadian Wildflower Society co-published (with the Federation of Ontario Naturalists) the first booklet on the native plants of Carolinian Canada with conservation and horticultural advice.

The Canadian Wildflower Society changed its name to the North American Native Plant Society (NANPS) in 1998. In 2003, it purchased a five-hectare (13-acre) parcel of Zinkan Island Cove, a provincially designated ANSI (Area of Natural and Scientific Interest) on the Bruce Peninsula in Ontario. In 2000 the North American Native Plant Society decided to stop supporting the publication of Wildflower magazine, and replaced it with "The Blazing Star'. Wildflower was published independently, but eventually ceased publication in 2004. In 2005, NANPS began conducting regular seminars around Ontario, and formed partnerships with Toronto Botanical Garden and the City of Markham. Also, a NANPS member founded an e-newsletter, The Local Scoop.

In 2010, NANPS celebrated its 25th anniversary by publishing a special edition of The Blazing Star. NANPS founder and Honorary President, James A French, published Silver Memories, a personal recollection of the first 25 years.

In 2013 the Society campaigned for a native plant garden as part of the renewal of Ontario Place.
