= Luman Reed =

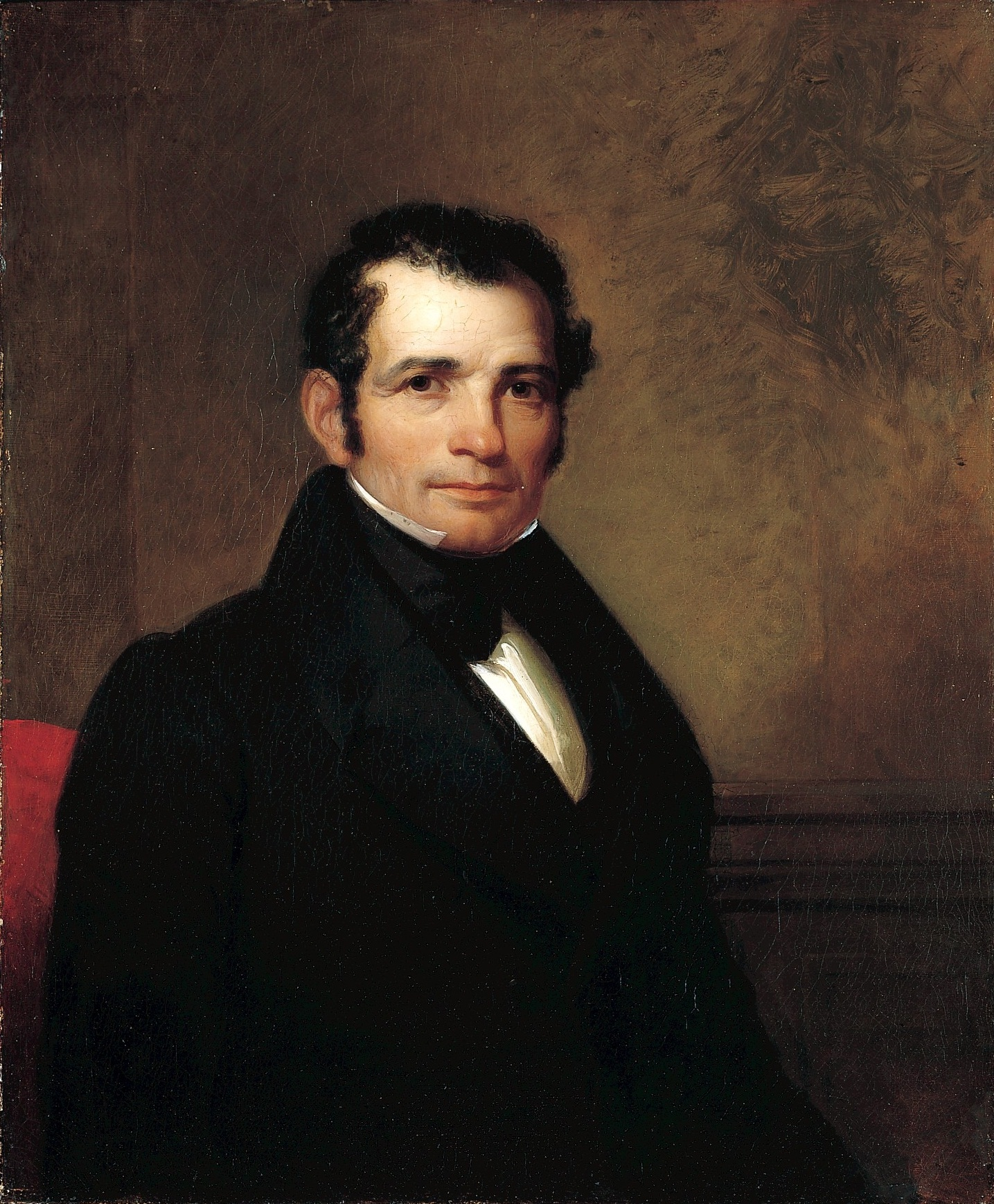
Portrait of Luman Reed by Asher B. Durand (1835)

Luman Reed (1787–1836) was a successful American merchant and an important patron of the arts. His support for the painters George Whiting Flagg and Thomas Cole were particularly significant contributions to the development of American painting during the early 19th century. He also commissioned works from artists such as Asher B. Durand.

== Biography ==
Reed was born on a farm in Green River (in the area that is now Austerlitz), New York. He began his business career as a store clerk in the Hudson River village of Coxsackie, New York, where his family relocated (c. 1789) before moving to New York City in 1815. There he became one of the city's most prominent merchants with the Front Street dry-goods firm he established with various partners, the last being Jonathan Sturges (1802–1874). With his wealth, Reed assembled in the course of six years one of the earliest and most significant collections of European and American art in the United States, which he displayed in a specially designed two-room gallery in his house on Greenwich Street in lower Manhattan.

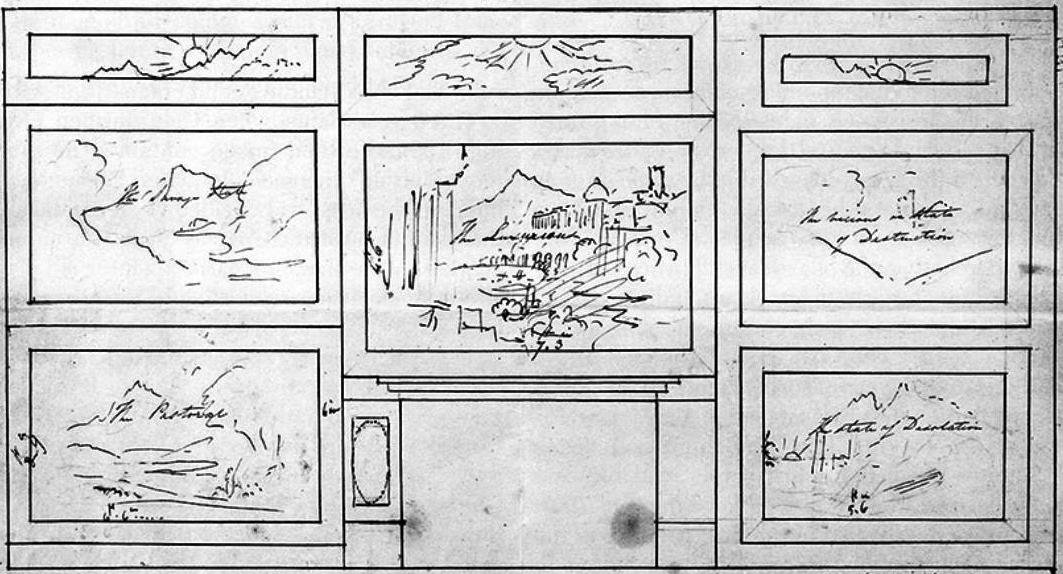
Painter Thomas Cole's 1833 sketch for the arrangement of the series "The Course of Empire" paintings around Luman Reed's fireplace: "The Savage State" / "The Consummation" / "Destruction"; "The Arcadian or Pastoral State" / "The Consummation" / "Desolation"

== Philanthropy ==
Reed attempted to promote the creation of a national artistic culture as sophisticated and accomplished as that of Europe. Besides his interest in landscape painting and portraiture, Reed was also an avid collector of genre paintings depicting scenes from everyday life.

In 1844, his substantial collection was purchased by a group of his associates in New York with the intention to form a public art collection, later the New York Gallery of Fine Arts, and was displayed for periods of time at the National Academy of Design and The Rotunda. The collection was later donated to the New-York Historical Society in 1858. It is one of the most important early 19th-century collections of American art that survives intact.
