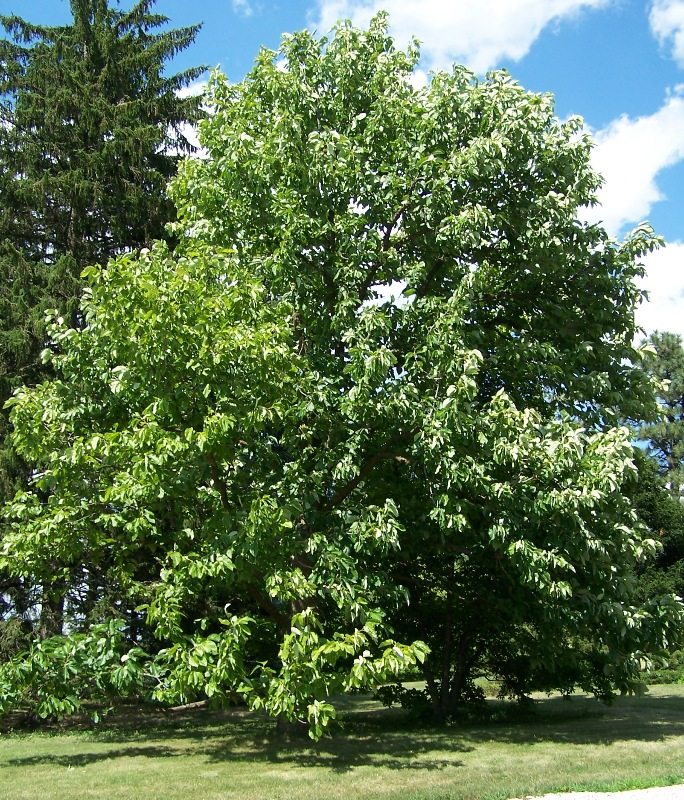
- Magnolia acuminata, Morton Arboretum acc. 1046-3*1

Conservation status
- Least Concern (IUCN 3.1)

- Secure (NatureServe)

Scientific classification
- Kingdom: Plantae
- Clade: Embryophytes
- Clade: Tracheophytes
- Clade: Spermatophytes
- Clade: Angiosperms
- Clade: Magnoliids
- Order: Magnoliales
- Family: Magnoliaceae
- Genus: Magnolia
- Subgenus: Magnolia subg. Yulania
- Section: Magnolia sect. Yulania
- Subsection: Magnolia subsect. Tulipastrum (Spach) Figlar & Noot.
- Species: M. acuminata

Binomial name
- Magnolia acuminata (L.) L.

Varieties
- Magnolia acuminata var. acuminata; Magnolia acuminata var. subcordata (Spach) Dandy
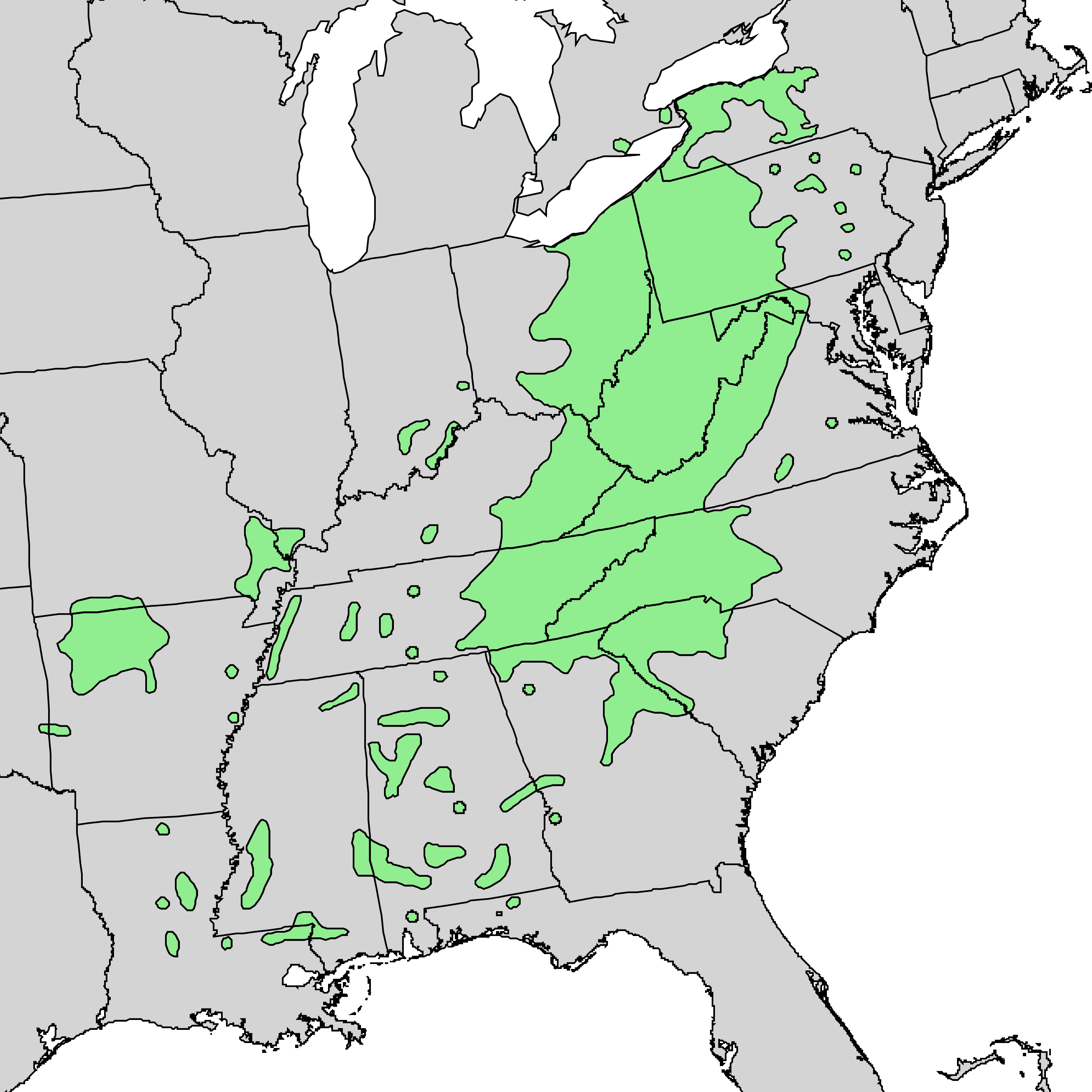

Synonyms
- Kobus acuminata (L.) Nieuwl.; Magnolia umbrella var. acuminata (L.) P.Parm.; Magnolia virginiana var. acuminata L.; Tulipastrum acuminatum (L.) Small; Tulipastrum americanum Spach; Tulipastrum americanum var. vulgare Spach; Yulania acuminata (L.) D.L.Fu

= Magnolia acuminata =

Cucumber tree

Species of tree

Magnolia acuminata, commonly called the cucumber tree (often spelled as a single word "cucumbertree"), cucumber magnolia or blue magnolia, is one of the largest magnolias, and one of the cold-hardiest. It is a large forest tree of the Eastern United States and Southern Ontario in Canada. It is a tree that tends to occur singly as scattered specimens, rather than in groves.

The cucumber tree is native primarily within the Appalachian belt, including the Allegheny Plateau and Cumberland Plateau, up to western Pennsylvania and New York. There are also numerous disconnected outlying populations through much of the southeastern U.S., and a few small populations in Southern Ontario. In Canada, the cucumber tree is listed as an endangered species and is protected under the Canadian Species at Risk Act. In 1993 the North American Native Plant Society purchased Shining Tree Woods to preserve a stand of Magnolia acuminata, which is also known as "The Shining Tree".

The leaves are deciduous, simple and alternate, oval to oblong, 12–25 centimetres (4.7–9.8 in) long and 6–12 centimetres (2.4–4.7 in) wide, with smooth margins and downy on the underside. They come in two forms, acuminate at both ends, or moderately cordate at the base (these are usually only formed high in the tree).

Unlike most magnolias, the flowers are not showy. They are typically small, yellow-green, and borne high in the tree in April through June. The leaves of Magnolia acuminata are pointed at the tip and provide it with its name - 'acuminate' means tapering to a fine point. The name "cucumber tree" refers to the unripe fruit, which is green and often shaped like a small cucumber; the fruit matures to a dark red color and is 6–8 centimetres (2.4–3.1 in) long and 4 centimetres (1.6 in) broad, with the individual carpels splitting open to release the bright red seeds, 10–60 per fruit. The ripe fruit is a striking reddish orange color.

== Uses and cultivation ==
Cucumber trees are excellent shade trees for parks and gardens, though they are not recommended for use as street trees. In cultivation, they typically only grow 15–20 m (49–66 ft) tall, although they reach over 30 m (98 ft) in ideal forest situations. They can become quite massive: the United States national (and presumed world) champion in Stark County, Ohio measures eight feet (2.4 m) in diameter and 96 ft (29 m) tall. They grow best in deep, moist, well-drained soils that are slightly acidic although they are tolerant of alkaline soils.

They are tricky to transplant due to their coarse, fleshy root system and should be planted shallow and moved in early spring with a good soil ball.

In the timber trade, the wood of this tree is interchangeable with that of the related tuliptree (Liriodendron tulipifera).

Magnolia acuminata has been used in hybridizing new varieties that share its yellow flower color and cold hardiness.

It additionally has been marked as a pollinator plant, supporting and attracting bees and butterflies. It is a host plant for butterflies, providing food during their larval stage.

== Gallery ==
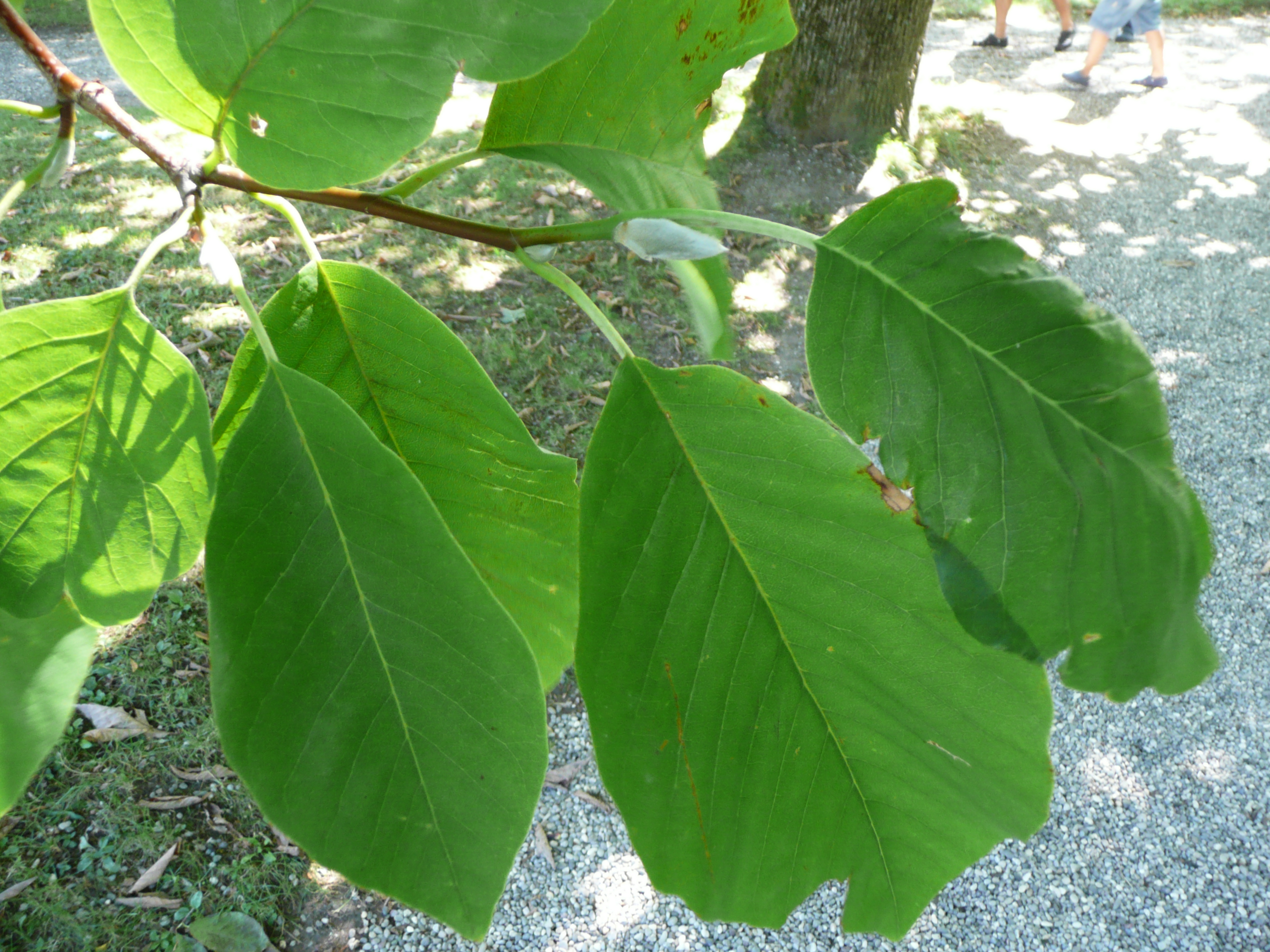
Leaves

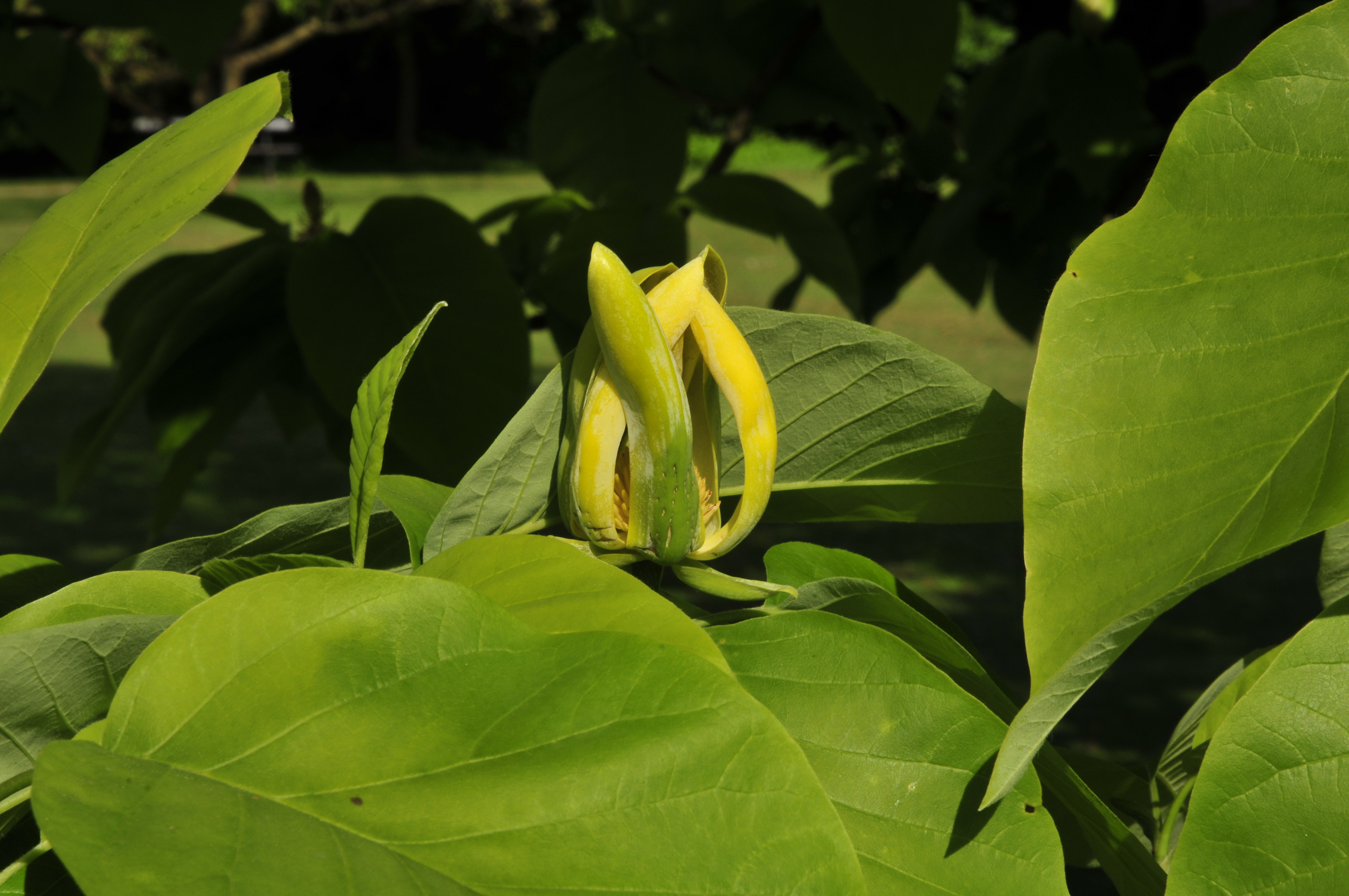
Flower

Fruit

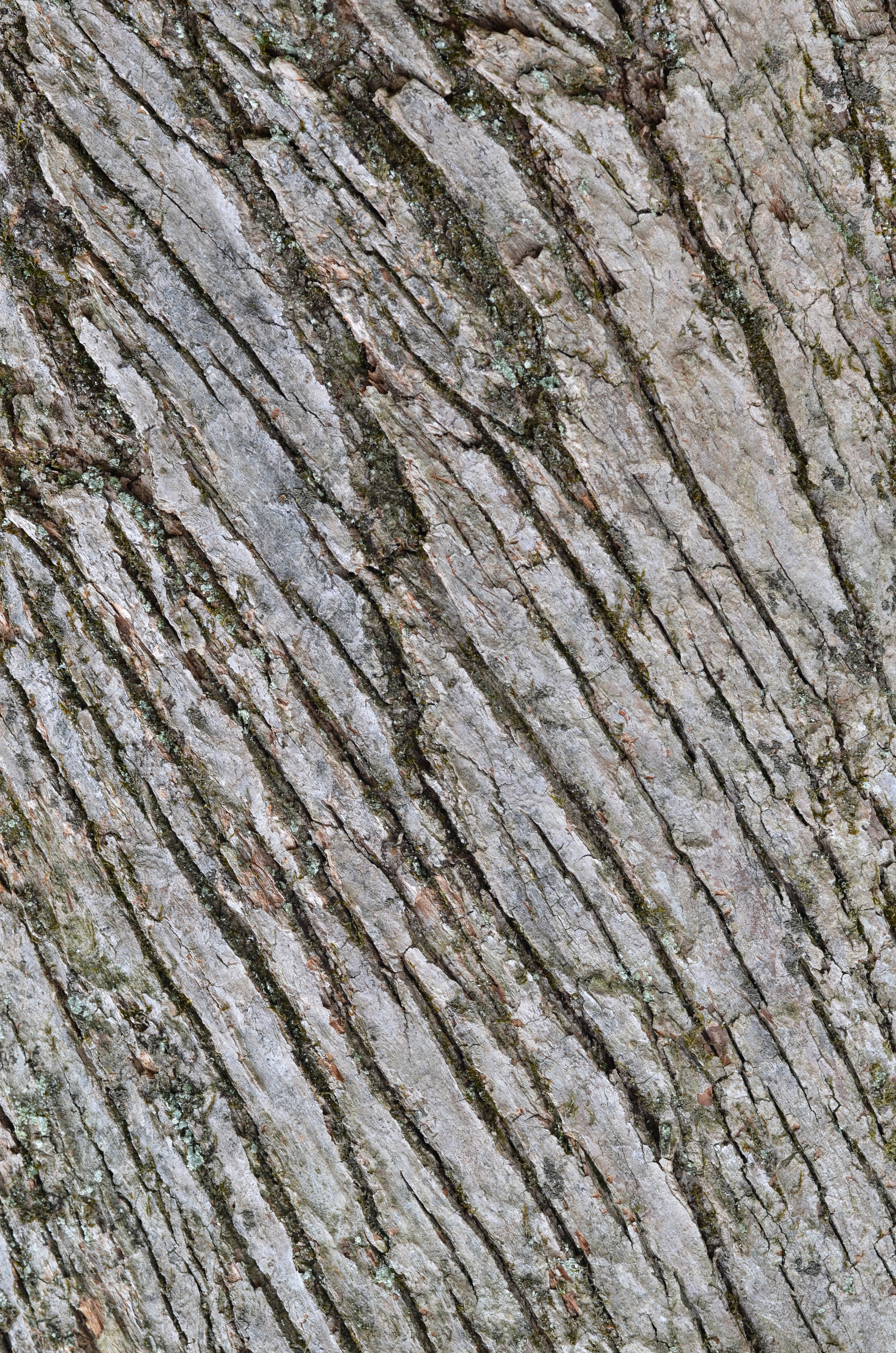
Bark

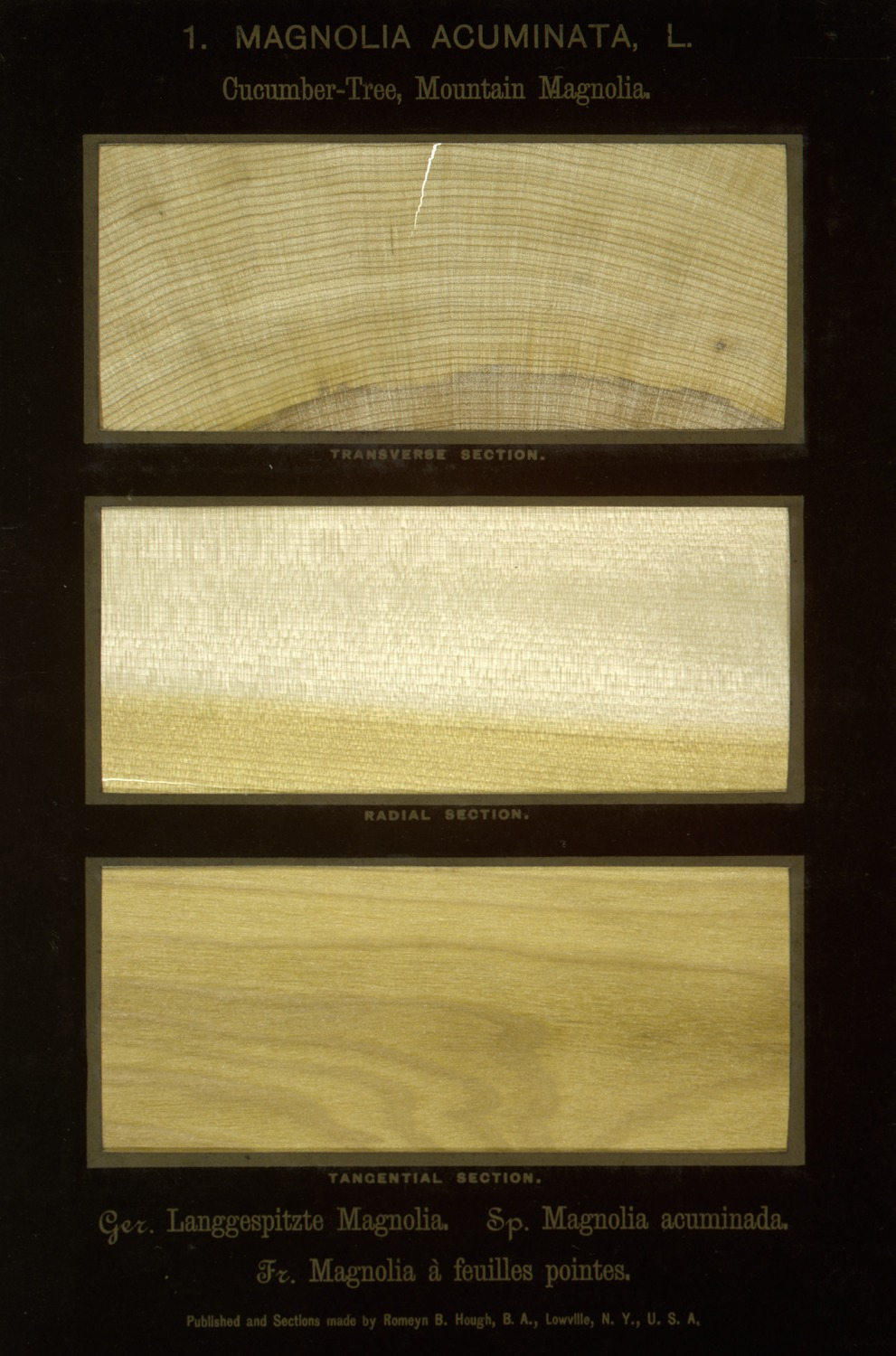
Sections of timber from The American Woods

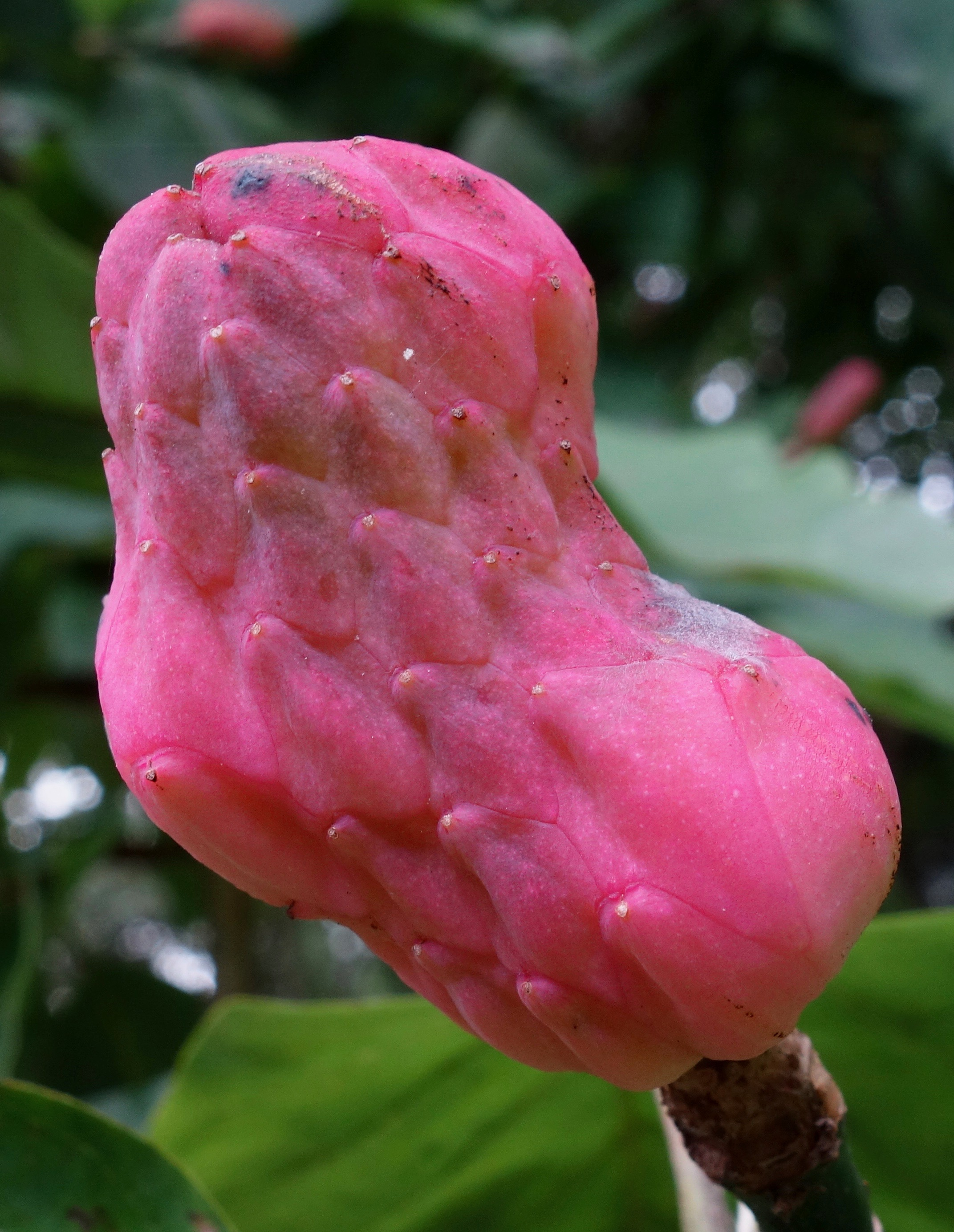
Maturing fruit

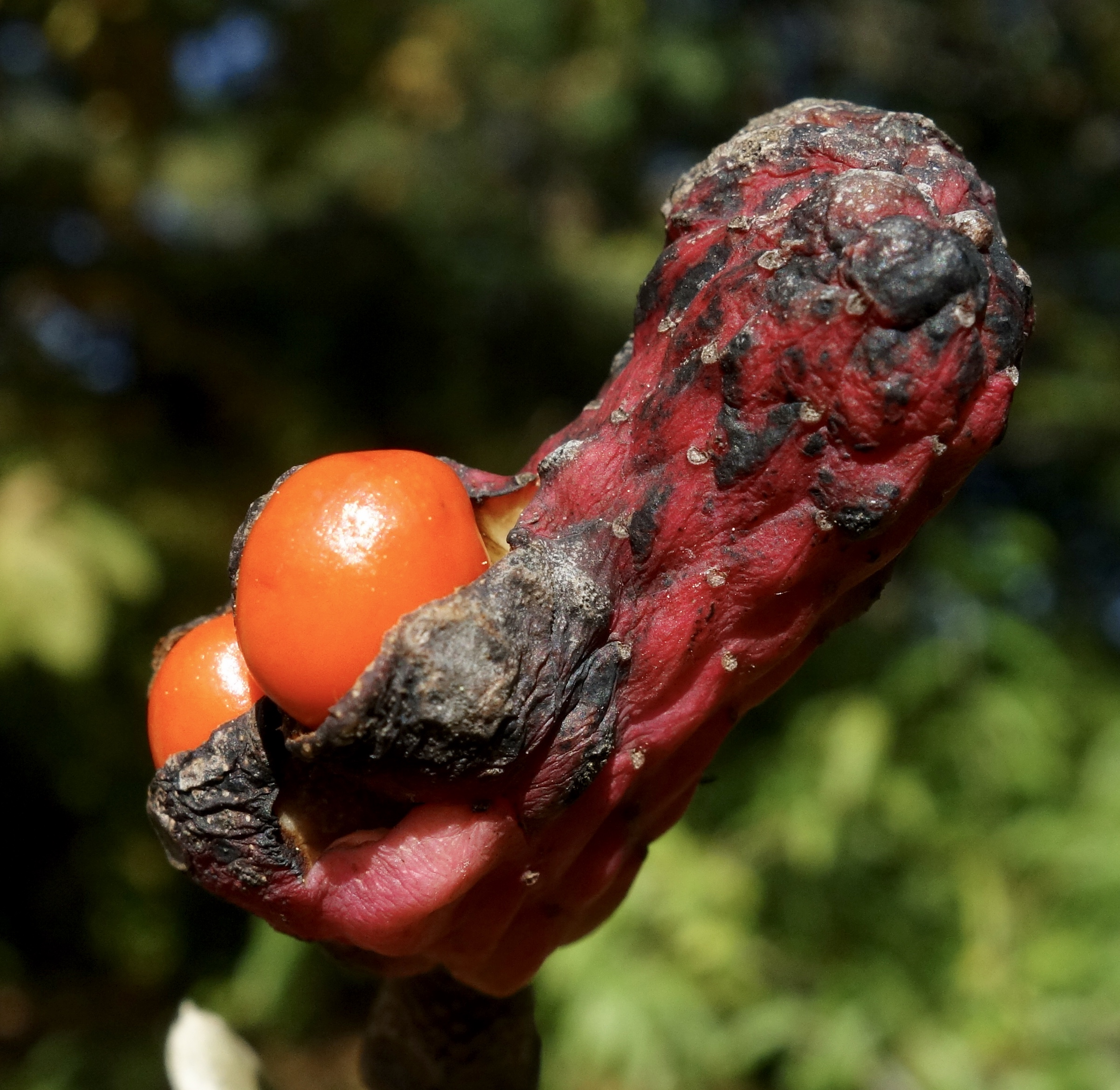
Mature fruit

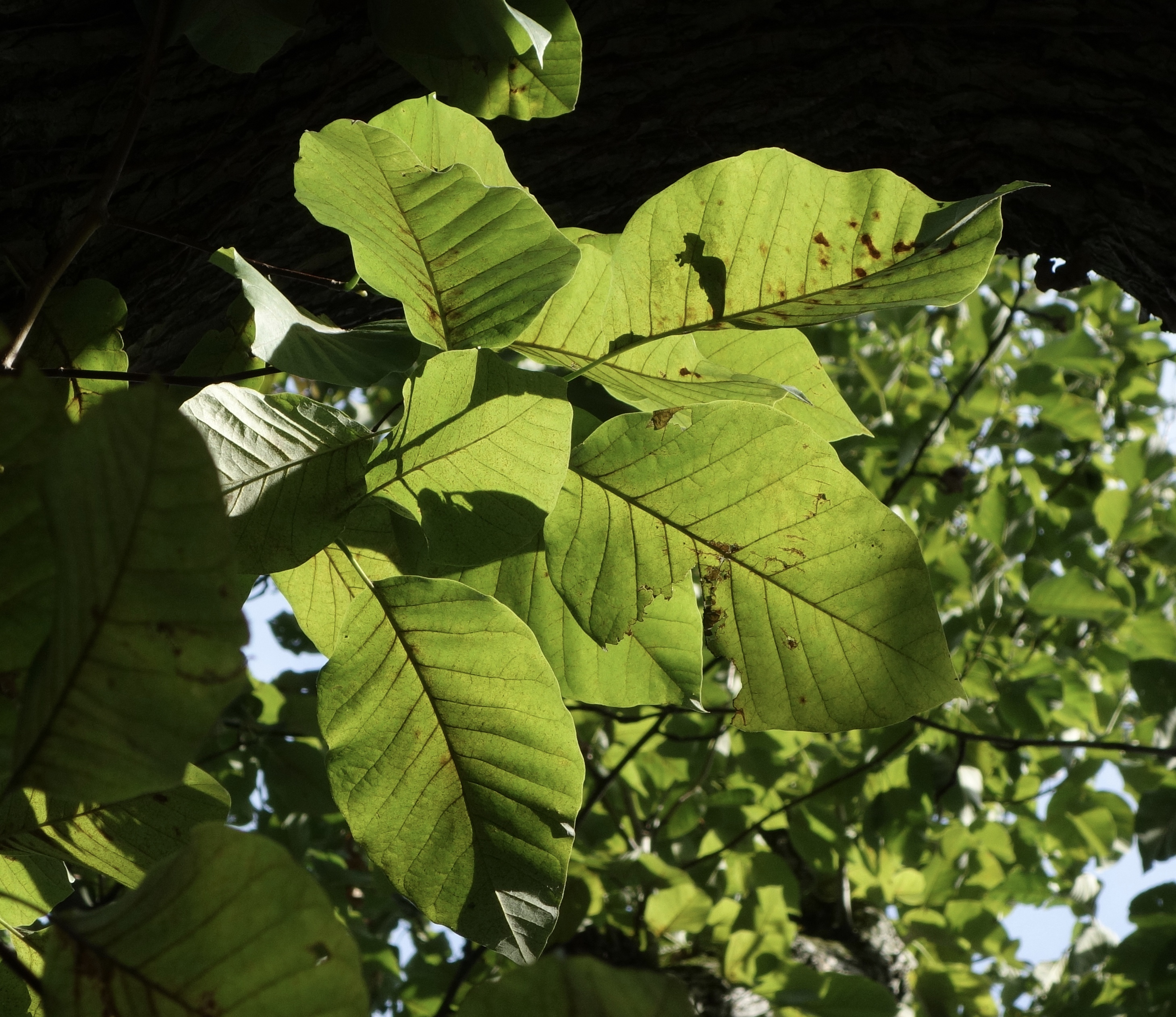
Leaves

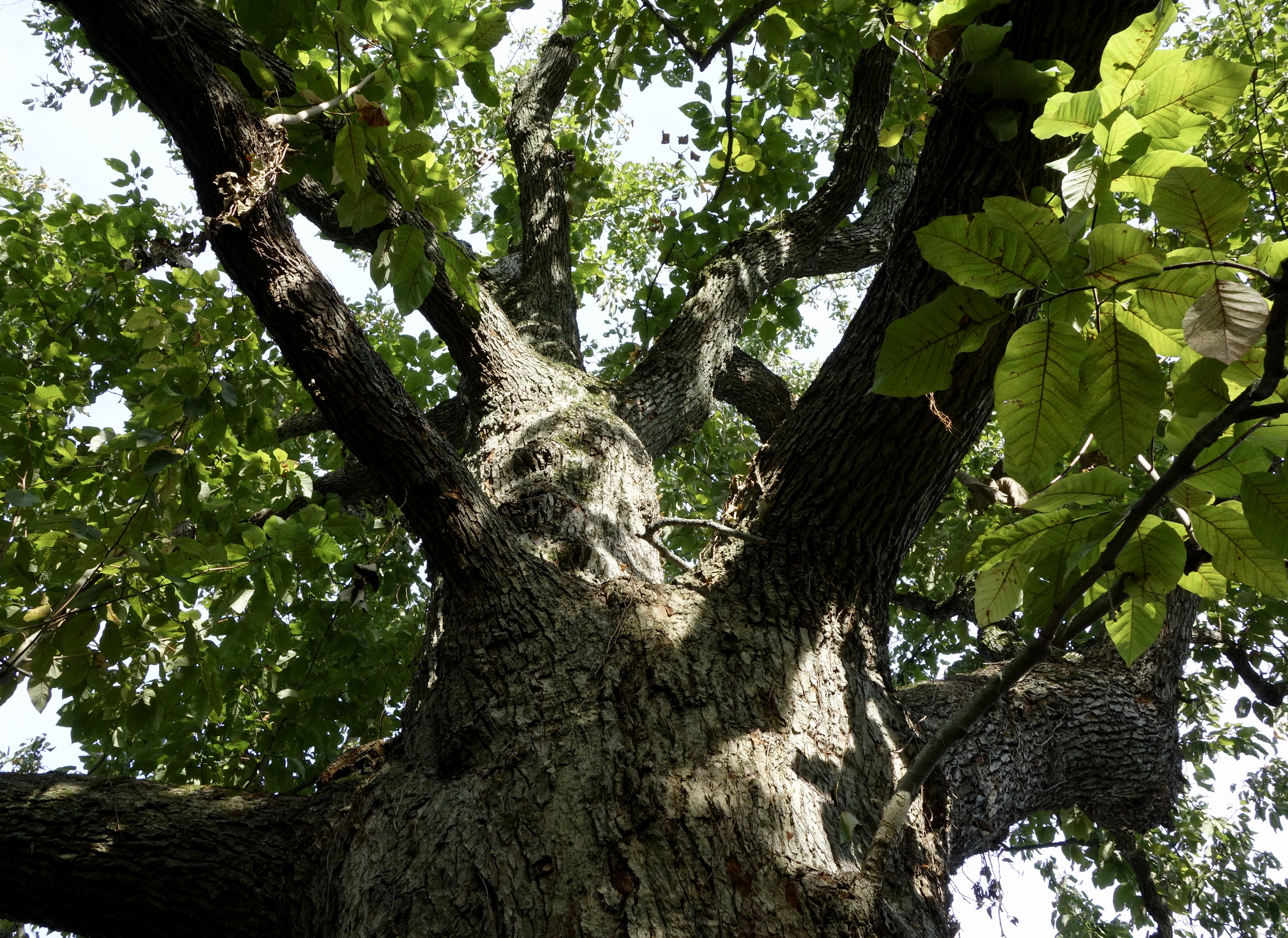
1880 accession (#15154*D), Arnold Arboretum of Harvard University
