= Ella Church Strobell =

American cytologist and zoologist

- Born: June 26, 1862
- Died: 1920 (aged 57–58)
- Scientific career
- Fields: Zoology, cytology

Ella Church Strobell (June 26, 1862 – 1920) was an American cytologist and zoologist who frequently collaborated with Katherine Foot.

== Early life and education ==
Ella Church Strobell was born on June 26, 1862. She was educated privately by tutors.

== Career ==
Ella Church Strobell was a cytologist and a member of the Society of Zoologists. She worked in the United States with her lab partner Katharine Foot, of whom much more is known. The majority of their papers were published in Woods Hole, Massachusetts. Their partnership began in 1896 and continued until their last publication in 1917. Historians theorize that the pair privately funded their research since they were never formally employed.

Strobell and Foot are best known for their studies of the egg of Allolobophora foetida, mainly due to the innovated research techniques they developed in the process. They invented a method to make very thin samples of material at low temperatures so that they could be viewed under a microscope. In addition, they were some of the first to photograph their samples rather than drawing them based on what they saw under the microscope.

Strobell and Foot conducted additional notable research on the role of chromosomes in hereditary, sex-linked characteristics. This research was conducted in New York City using earthworms. Strobell and Foot strongly opposed Stevens and Wilson's theory that chromosomes exist as individual structures because they appeared too variable in shape and size. Although they were ultimately wrong, their photomicrographs of chromosomes helped to advance the field.

In 1914, the pair travelled to England to collaborate with entomologist Harry Eltringham of New College Oxford on his research on the crossbreeding of Hemiptera. After her death, Ella Church Strobell continued to support Katharine Foot's research through a legacy that funded 2 years of study on the life cycle of a louse for the American Red Cross.

== Death and legacy ==
In 1917, Strobell bequeathed several paintings by John Vanderlyn and miniature portraits by Louisa C. Strobel to the Metropolitan Museum. She is a descendant of Daniel Strobel Jr., Anna Church Strobel, and Elizabeth Maria Church, the sitters featured in the works of art.

Strobell died in 1920.

== Publications ==
- Further Notes on the Egg of Allolobophora foetida Foot and Strobell, 1898
  - Description: The goal of this study was to perform a comparative study of living and fixed cytoplasm using the eggs at different stages. Strobell and Foot were able to study live eggs of Allolobophora foetida under high magniication using a Bausch and Lomb compressor, a feat that Foot had been attempting since 1894. The purpose of this particular paper was to discuss the photomicrography techniques using a broad overview of their work with the eggs. Three plates at different stages labeled A, B, and C are discussed in detail with 6 accompanying photographs each to show different perspectives. All three were fixed using a different method but the photographic technique remained consistent, using daylight near noon with 15–30 seconds of exposure.
- A New Method Of Focusing In Photomicrography Foot and Strobell, 1901
- Further Notes on the Cocoons of Allolobophora foetida Foot and Strobell, 1902
  - Description: This study explores whether the spermatozoa of the cocoon of Allolobophora are derived from the spermathecae. This previously popular interpretation was challenged because of the discovery that the cocoons are formed during copulation. However, Foot and Strobell found that cocoons can be formed and deposited when the worms are not copulating.
- Sectioning Paraffine at a Temperature of 25 °Fahrenheit Foot and Strobell, 1905
  - Description: The methods described in this paper were opposite to and more complicated than other methods used by contemporary investigators. However, Foot and Strobell found those methods to be insufficient for their studies, possibly because they imbedded only a single row of eggs in each block and use less fixing and hardening. The described technique was shown to be successful at securing sections of 3 microns or less, allowing better visualization of the centrosome than was previously available.
- The "Accessory Chromosome" of Anasa Tristis Foot and Strobell, 1907
  - Description: This paper is written in support of Moore and Robinson's previous interpretation that, in regards to the spermatogenesis of Periplanata americana, the nucleolus of the first spermatocyte is the homologue of one or two spermatogonial chromosomes. They attribute the elongate form to mechanical influences and believe it to usually have a spherical shape like the nucleolus. In place of Periplanata americana, Foot and Strobell studied the spermatogenesis of Anasa tristis. The original paper asserts that Anasa tristis has 22 chromosomes, but they confirmed Paulmier and Montgomery's assessment that Anasa tristis has 21 chromosomes after the paper was sent to press.
- The Nucleoli in the Spermatocytes and Germinal Vesicles of Euschistus variolarius Foot and Strobell, 1909
- Preliminary Note on the Results of Crossing Two Hemipterous Species with Reference to the Inheritance of an Exclusively Male Character and Its Bearing on Modern Chromosome Theories Foot and Strobell, 1913
- Preliminary Report of Crossing Two Hemipterous Species, with Reference to the Inheritance of a Second Exclusively Male Character Foot and Strobell, 1914
- Results of Crossing Euschistus Variolarius and Euschistus Ictericus with Reference to the Inheritance of Two Exclusively Male Characters Foot and Strobell, 1917

== Metropolitan Museum of Art bequest ==
image	title	painter	date	accession number	The Met url
	Portrait of Daniel Strobel, Jr.	John Vanderlyn	ca. 1799	17.134.1	MET
	Portrait of Elizabeth Maria Church	John Vanderlyn	1799	17.134.2	MET
	Portrait of Mrs. Daniel Strobel, Jr. (Anna Church Strobel) and Her Son, George	John Vanderlyn	1799	17.134.3	MET
	Portrait of Sarah Russell Church (daughter of Edward Church)	John Vanderlyn	1799	17.134.4	MET
	Self-portrait	Louisa C. Strobel	ca. 1830	17.134.5	MET
	Portrait of Mrs. Daniel Strobel Jr. (Anna Church)	John Vanderlyn	ca. 1830	17.134.6	MET
	Portrait of Daniel Strobel, Jr.	John Vanderlyn	ca. 1830	17.134.7	MET
	Portrait of a Man	Jean-Pierre-Frédéric Barrois	ca. 1790	17.134.8	MET

== See also ==
- Timeline of women in science
