= Mercè Durfort i Coll =

Spanish biologist and professor (1943–2022)

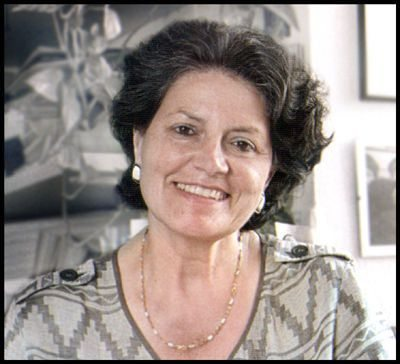
- Born: 20 April 1943; La Suze-sur-Sarthe, France
- Died: 7 April 2022 (aged 78); Barcelona, Spain
- Education: University of Barcelona
- Occupations: Biologist, professor
- Organisation: Institute for Catalan Studies

Mercè Durfort i Coll (4 April 1943 – 7 April 2022) was a Spanish biologist and professor. She was a member of Institute for Catalan Studies from 1989 until her death.
