= Ronald Collé =

American physicist (born 1946)

Ronald Collé (born February 11, 1946) is an American physicist. He is a specialist in nuclear and radiochemistry, radionuclidic metrology, and the development of standards. He has worked at the National Institute of Standards and Technology (NIST) from 1976 to 2003 and from 2005 to present, and currently serves as a research chemist in the Radioactivity Group of the NIST Physics Laboratory (Ionizing Radiation Division).

Previously, he held research positions at Brookhaven National Laboratory, and at the University of Maryland, College Park. He received a B.Sc. in chemistry from the Georgia Institute of Technology in 1969, a Ph.D. in chemistry (nuclear and radiochemistry) from Rensselaer Polytechnic Institute in 1972, and an M.S. Adm. (Administration of Science and Technology) from George Washington University in 1979.

Collé and his collaborators have maintained, expanded and improved radioactivity measurement standards for radium-226 and radon-222 to address the requirements to measure these nuclides in drinking water. Collé and collaborators developed methods to analyse and standardize brachytherapy sources, pellets of radioactive material designed to be implanted in the body at site requiring direct radiation exposure.

An important part of metrology and standards development is understanding and taking into account uncertainties that are inherent in the instruments or that arise from methodology. Collé co-authored a paper with Churchill Eisenhart and Harry Ku, which was the forerunner of the 1993 ISO Guide to the Expression of Uncertainty in Measurement.

Collé has published over ninety research papers, and from 1999 through 2004 was an associate editor of the Journal of Research of the National Institute of Standards and Technology.
