= Colla (Thrace) =

Settlement of ancient Thrace

Coordinates: 40°47′50″N 26°25′14″E

Colla was a settlement and station (mutatio) of ancient Thrace, inhabited during Roman and Byzantine times.

Its site is located near Sığırcıl in European Turkey.
