= Patrick Coll =

Irish lawyer (1839–1917)

Sir Patrick Coll (1839–1917) was an Irish lawyer. He was the Chief Crown Solicitor for Ireland from 1888 to 1905.

Coll was sworn of the Privy Council of Ireland in 1905.
