= Connie Colla =

American television news anchor and host

- Born: Great Falls, Montana, U.S.
- Occupations: Luxury real estate agent Television news anchor Television personality Actress
- Children: 2

Connie Colla is an American former television news anchor and host. She has anchored in San Diego, Phoenix, and Philadelphia, and has filled in on Weekend Today on NBC. Colla also played a television reporter in the movie Law Abiding Citizen, starring Jaime Foxx and Gerard Butler.

== Early life ==
Colla was born in Great Falls, Montana and graduated from Montana State University.

== Career ==
Colla moved to Arizona in 2009 to anchor the morning and midday news at KNXV-TV in Phoenix. She left the channel to start her own real estate company; her last day at the station was December 4, 2014.

Colla has been a guest cooking host on The Fretz Kitchen, a nationally syndicated cooking show. She has won several Emmy awards for her work during her career.

== Personal life ==
Colla lives in Scottsdale, Arizona with her two children.
