= Colla Swart =

South African photographer (1930–2023)

- Born: 1930
- Died: 2023 (aged 92–93)
- Citizenship: South Africa
- Occupation: Photographer

Colla Swart (1930–2023) was a South African photographer. She started professional photography in 1982, and has photographed nature and people in and around her birth town of Kamieskroon. Colla and her Canadian photographer friend Freeman Patterson hosted, until recently, annual photographic workshops in Namaqualand, known for its beautiful floral scenery around August to September.

Swart has photographed Namaqualand wild flowers and made multiple exposure photographs.

She lived in Piketberg, Western Cape, South Africa, the hometown of her late son, and daughter-in-law.
