= Philippe Collas =

French writer and scriptwriter

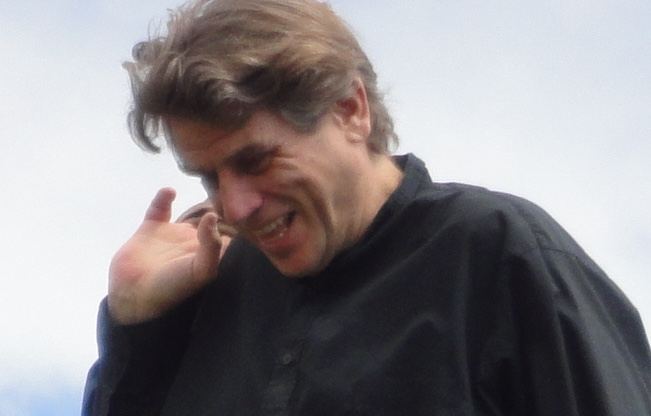
Philippe Collas

Philippe Collas or Philippe Collas-Villedary (born in France) is a French writer and scriptwriter who is famous for his historical and criminal thrillers. As the great-grandson of Pierre Bouchardon, the man who arrested Mata Hari, his biography about her is considered a notable reference.

== Awards ==
- 1989: "Lauréat de la Villa Médicis Hors-Les Murs" for his work on King Ludwig II of Bavaria.
- 1991: "Prix Anne Philipe", named after the widow of the famous French actor, Gérard Philipe, an award for the most talented young theatrical writer.

== Works ==
- Louis II et Elisabeth d'Autriche, Âmes soeurs, (Le Rocher, Paris/Monaco 2001) (ISBN 978 2 268 03884 1)
- Maurice Dekobra, Gentleman entre deux mondes (Séguier, Paris 2002) (ISBN 2 84049 264 4)
- Edith Wharton's French Riviera, with Éric Villedary (Flammarion, Paris 2002; Rizzoli New-York 2002) (ISBN 284 1101614)
- Mata Hari, Sa Véritable Histoire, (Plon, Paris) 2003, (Piper Verlag, Munich 2009) (ISBN 978-2-2591-9872-1)
- Jean de La Fontaine, Détective (four opus) (Plon, Paris 2004/2007)
- Mata Hari, La dernière danse de l'espionne. (French Pulp 2017). (ISBN 979 10 251 0249 7)
- L'Île du Lundi, with Éric Villedary, (French Pulp 2018) (ISBN 979 10 251 03 203)
- La Pausa: The Ideal Mediterranean Villa of Gabrielle Chanel/ La Pausa: La maison méditerranéenne idéale de Gabrielle Chanel (Flammarion), (Team work) (ISBN 978-2-08-045492-8)

etc.
