= J. P. Collas =

British philologist

John Peter Collas (usually known as J. P. Collas; 17 April 1911 – 13 August 1984) was a British philologist. In his obituary, he was described as being "the principal Anglo-Norman scholar of the day" and "one of the leading philologists of his generation."

Collas was born in Guernsey in 1911 and was educated at Elizabeth College in St Peter Port before winning an exhibition at Jesus College, Oxford, where he obtained a B.A. degree in 1932. He conducted research into Norman-French, leading to a B.Litt. degree in 1934. He became a lecturer at Manchester University in 1936, moving to Glasgow University in 1937. He was a conscientious objector during the Second World War. After returning to Manchester University in 1946, he was appointed as Lecturer in French at Queen Mary College in 1947. He became professor and head of department in 1953, and remained at the college until his retirement in 1976, although he continued to carry out research in his retirement.

He came from a Guernsey family that spoke Guernésiais. He conducted research into Jèrriais, including Sercquiais – although this research was never completed, it was made available to other scholars in the field and the fieldwork papers are currently in the collection of the Priaulx Library in Guernsey. He studied Anglo-Norman from the Middle Ages onwards, working on the Anglo-Norman dictionary for twenty years, and developing a particular interest in Anglo-Norman law, publishing three volumes of Year Books from the time of King Edward II for the Selden Society. In his regard, he was consulted on one occasion by the Supreme Court of Canada. He also taught medieval French literature and, when called upon to do so, could teach topics in more modern fields such as Proust. He died in Dorset on 13 August 1984. His wife, Gaby Cassel, survived him.
