= Billy McColl (footballer) =

Scottish footballer

Personal information
- Full name: William Christopher McColl
- Date of birth: 25 December 1954 (age 71)
- Place of birth: Shettleston, Glasgow, Scotland
- Position: Midfielder

Youth career
- Drumchapel Amateurs

Senior career*
Years	Team	Apps	(Gls)
1972–1978	Clydebank	152	(23)
1978–1981	Ayr United	88	(1)
1981–1983	Clyde	47	(0)
1983	Albion Rovers	1	(0)
- * Club domestic league appearances and goals

William Christopher McColl (born 25 December 1954) is a Scottish retired footballer. He played as a midfielder for Clydebank, Ayr United, Clyde and Albion Rovers in the 1970s and 1980s, winning the Scottish Second Division title twice.

== Early life ==
Billy McColl was born in the Shettleston area of Glasgow on 25 December 1954.

== Playing career ==
A product of the Glasgow youth team Drumchapel Amateurs, McColl began his senior career with Clydebank, signing for them as a 17-year-old in November 1972. He was a member of the squad that won the inaugural Second Division title in 1975-76 before going on to win promotion to the Premier Division a year later, the first time the club had appeared in the top flight of Scottish football. In 1976, McColl scored the opening goal of a 2–2 draw with St Mirren at Kilbowie Park in what was the last senior match in England or Scotland ever to be played on Christmas Day (also McColl's birthday). He would make over 150 Scottish League appearances for Clydebank before a transfer to Ayr United in 1978.

In 1981 McColl joined Clyde under the management of Craig Brown and won another Second Division championship medal in season 1981-82. His last senior club was Albion Rovers in 1983 where he made just a single league appearance before retiring.

== After football ==
After leaving football, McColl went into business as a sub-postmaster and newsagent in Netherlee, East Renfrewshire. His son Barry McColl also played Scottish League football, for Queen's Park in the 1990s. In 2019, Billy McColl was inducted into the Clydebank F.C. Hall of Fame.

== Honours ==
Clydebank

- Scottish Second Division: 1975–76

Clyde

- Scottish Second Division: 1981–82
