= Jimmy McColl (footballer, born 1924) =

Scottish footballer

Personal information
- Full name: James McColl
- Date of birth: 13 November 1924
- Place of birth: Scotland
- Date of death: 8 August 2013 (aged 88)
- Position: Full back

Senior career*
Years	Team	Apps	(Gls)
1946–1948	Queen's Park	29	(0)
1948–1950	Queen of the South	26	(0)
1950–1951	Falkirk	5	(0)
1951–1952	Cowdenbeath	27	(0)
Total		87	(0)

International career
1948	Great Britain	2	(0)
- * Club domestic league appearances and goals

James McColl (13 November 1924 – 8 August 2013) was a Scottish footballer who represented Great Britain at the 1948 Summer Olympics, making two appearances.

A full back, McColl had been with amateur club Queen's Park until the Summer of the Olympics in which he played. After the Olympics he was one of two players in the GB Olympic squad to move that summer from Queens Park to Dumfries club, Queen of the South. The other was Dougie McBain.

McColl spent two seasons at Palmerston Park before he moved on to spend a season at each of Falkirk and Cowdenbeath.
