= MacColl =

MacColl is a surname from the Scottish Gaelic ”MacColla”, meaning "Son of Coll" shared by several notable people:

Born after 1800

- Evan MacColl (Gaelic poet) (1808–1898), Scots-Canadian Gaelic poet
- Hugh MacColl (1837–1909), Scottish logician and author
- Malcolm MacColl (1838–1907), British clergyman and publicist
- Dugald Sutherland MacColl (1859–1948), Scottish painter and writer

Born after 1900

- James MacColl (1908–1971), British Member of Parliament
- Ewan MacColl (born 'Miller', 1915–1989), British singer-songwriter, actor and playwright

Born after 1950

- Catriona MacColl (born 1954), English film and television actress
- Kirsty MacColl (1959–2000), British singer-songwriter with several top-10 singles on the UK and Irish music charts
- Mary-Rose MacColl (born 1961), Australian novelist
- Angus MacColl, Scottish bagpipe player

MacColl is also apparently an uncommon male Scottish given name, perhaps and spelled without CamelCase, i.e. as "Maccoll".

== Origin and Clan MacColl ==
The surname 'MacColl' has its origin in a Scottish clan by the name of Clan MacColl, which had a historical association with the sea loch Loch Fyne, located in the modern day unitary council area of Argyll and Bute. Clan MacColl is considered by some to be a branch of Clan Donald (MacDonald) based on several lines of evidence including a shared badge (sprig of heather). In the year 1602, Clan MacColl lost most of their military force in a battle with Clan MacPherson.

Additional lines of MacColls exist, though not all are of Scottish Highland clan origin. For instance, folk singer and political activist James Henry Miller changed his name to Ewan MacColl for stage purposes. His children assumed the stage name, and there is a third generation of these MacColls through the children of his daughter, Kirsty MacColl.

== Distribution ==
According to United States Census data from 1840, 1880 and 1920, the MacColl surname was not recorded as present in the United States in 1840, was found only in New York by 1880, and had spread, albeit thinly, to the West Coast by 1920. Meanwhile, according to 1891 census date from England and Wales, MacColls were found in five counties in the north and east of England, with the greatest number identified in Lancashire and London.

== See also ==
- McColl
