= Louis Antoine Collas =

Louis Antoine Collas (Bordeaux, 1775 - Bordeaux, 1856) was a portrait and miniature painter from France. Collas's work primarily consisted of oil paintings and miniature water colors.

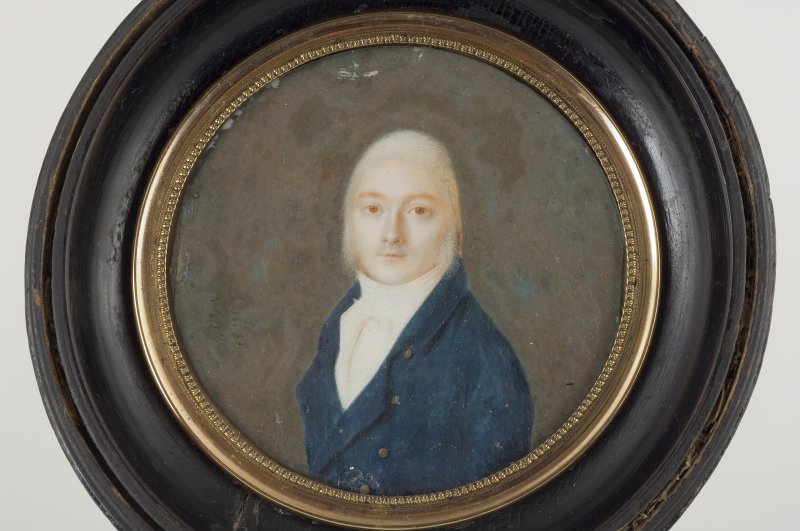
Portrait de Jean-Charles-Auguste, dit John, Géraud

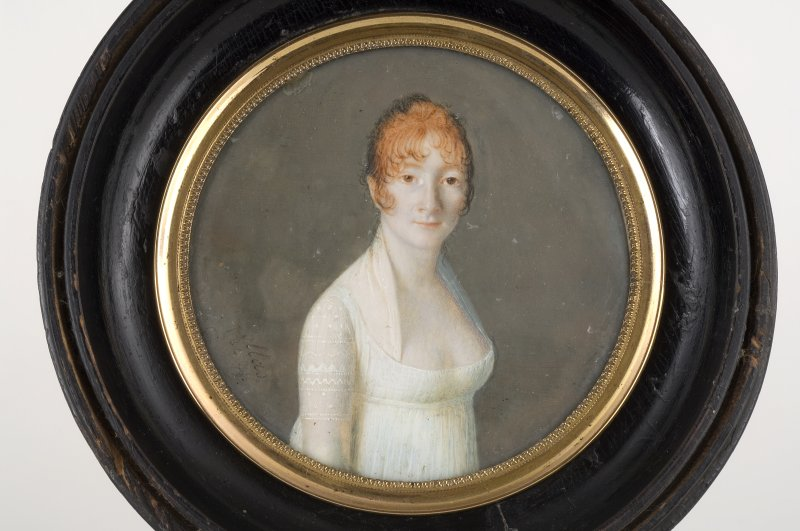
Portrait d'Elisabeth Ferriere, épouse de John Géraud

Collas moved to America in the 1810s. Collas was one of the most influential and important French miniature painters that came to America and New Orleans. He exhibited in the Paris Salon as well as several Academies of Fine Arts in America. Although originally from France, Collas is considered an American artist.

== Artist's Life ==
Louis Antoine Collas was born in Bordeaux, France in 1775. Little to no information can be found on the early childhood of Collas. Collas started his art career and studied under François-André Vincent in Paris. He debuted at the Paris Salon in 1798 with one self portrait. The next year he sent several miniatures to the Paris Salon and would periodically continue to do so. Between 1803 (though it is claimed he moved in 1808) and 1811, Collas moved to St. Petersburg, Russia where he painted aristocrats and various people of high status. While in Russia, Collas worked for Czar Alexander I's court. Other notable figures that he painted while in Russia were Duchess Catherine Pavlovna and Prince Serge Nikolaewitch Galitinne.

Collas left Russia in 1811 and moved back to Paris. After returning to Paris, Collas exhibited at the Paris Salon of 1812. Between 1812 and 1816, little is known of what he was doing until he arrived in New York City and listed himself as "Lewis Collers" in New York City directory. He exhibited thirteen miniatures, three of which were on porcelain, at the Academy of Fine Arts in New York between 1816 and 1820. He exhibited several miniatures at the Pennsylvania Academy of Fine Arts in 1819. Collas traveled along the East Coast advertising in Philadelphia, Baltimore, and Charleston. Collas returned to New York in 1820 where he exhibited in another Academy of Fine arts exhibition. He visited New Orleans in 1822 and was one of the earliest European artists to work in New Orleans. He was identified as a "portrait and miniature painter" and that he was living at 35 St. Peter Street. He had come into the painting genre for local patrons before Jean-Francios de Vallee, a miniature painter who was superior to Collas. Vallee was successful but he didn't receive as much attention in the press as Collas did. Collas was praised in the Louisiana Gazette. On January 20, 1823 the Louisiana Gazette stated:

"We notice with pleasure at Mr. Elkin's Exchange a Frame enclosing miniature paintings by Mr. Collas. The finish of his portraits leave nothing to be desired for resemblance. We can compare it with the life-sized portrait above the frame. It is a speaking likeness. Everyone can recognize the artist whom one of his colleagues has delineated. Unfortunately, fate has snatched Lancelin from us. I do not pretend to make any comparison between the two painters, but I will limit myself by saying that the real and beautiful talent of Mr. Collas should be encouraged in all cities, and since those I have seen in France, I have found nothing more graceful than his works."

Collas announced his return in the New Orleans papers with notices almost every year after his flattering criticism. These notices stated ads such as "Collas, L.- Painter, Has the honor of informing his friends and the public of New Orleans, that he has returned to this city, and intends to exercise his art in portrait and miniatures." These adds continued from 1823 to 1829 normally around April and were nearly identical. Sometime between 1831 and 1832, Collas returned to Paris. He exhibited again at the Paris Salon, but didn't receive as much attention or notice as what he usually achieved. It is believed that Collas died in Paris in 1833, but no documentation can be found. Collas's place of death is unknown.

== Artist's Work ==
Collas's portrait of Mrs. Andry was likely a member of the Andrey family (also spelled Andry or André). The Andrey family was very active in federal and colonial militias in Louisiana. The family owned multiple plantations in St. James Parish. Collas's Mrs. Andry is very likely to be the same Mrs. André who intrigued John James Audubon. Audubon wrote in his diary on February 21, 1821 saying "one of those discouraging incidents connected with the life of the artists. I had a likeness spoken of in very rude terms by the fair lady it was made for, and perhaps will loos my time and the reward expected for my labours." Audubon identified her later by her name: "Mrs. André - I mention name as I may speak more of the likeness as the occasion will require." Collas depicts a possible widow André, who lived on Armour Street in 1829. Her eyes are grey which seem sad and tired. Her distant gaze is to give off the sense of contemplation, deep emotion and reverie.

Collas's Portrait of a Free Woman of Color Wearing a Tignon was painted in 1829 while he was in New Orleans. This painting resides in the New Orleans Museum of Art and is on display. The woman in the painting was an unknown free woman of color which was pretty rare especially in southern states like Louisiana. The woman in the picture is wearing a tignon, a headdress worn by women in Louisiana with African descent. A law in 1786 mandated both women of free color and enslaved dark-skinned women must wear a head scarf so that could be distinguished from white women. Free women of color subverted the intent of the law and adopted vibrant luxury fabrics to wear for their own artistic self-fashioning. The woman in the painting seems to be proud of her heritage, and is proud to wear her vibrant green tignon. She is seated, commonly seen in portraits of women, with a smile on her face while staring directly at the viewer. Her expression gives a sense of sarcasm. Her expression reads, "You thought this would oppress us, but all you did was give us a great fashion trend."

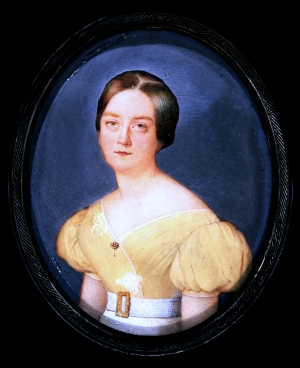
Portrait of Mrs. Andry

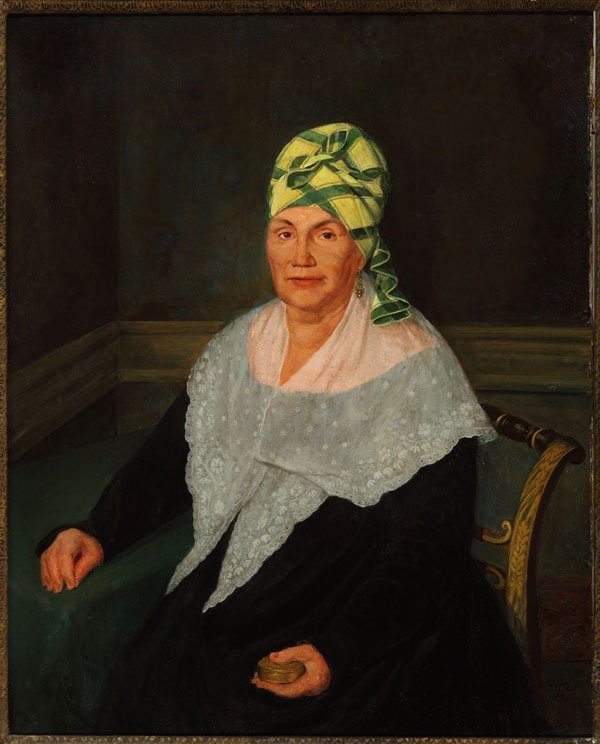
Portrait of a Free Woman of Color Wearing a Tignon, 1829
