= Hibernian F.C. in European football =

Scottish club in European football

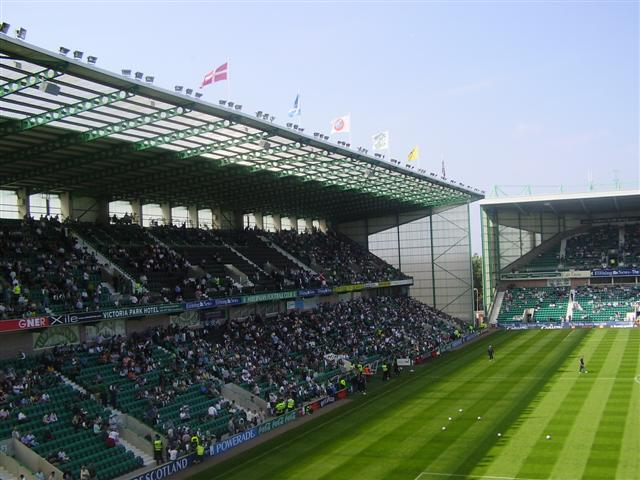
- Easter Road, before an Intertoto Cup match between Hibs and Odense in July 2006.
- Club: Hibernian F.C.
- First entry: 1955–56 European Cup
- Latest entry: 2026–27 UEFA Conference League

Titles
- Champions League: (Best: Semi-final)
- Europa League: (Best: Second round)
- Cup Winners' Cup: (Best: Quarter-final)
- Conference League: (Best: Play-off round)
- Inter-Cities Fairs Cup: (Best: Semi-final)

Hibernian Football Club ("Hibs") is a Scottish football club, based in the Leith area of Edinburgh. Hibernian were the first ever British club to enter an official European footballing competition, doing so in the inaugural 1955–56 season of the European Cup. They were also the first Scottish club to participate in the Fairs Cup, an unofficial forerunner of the UEFA Cup and Europa League competitions.

Hibernian reached the semi-final stage in the European Cup (1955–56) and the Fairs Cup (1960–61). They participated in European competition during the 1960s and 1970s on an almost annual basis, competing with many of the major club sides during this period. During this time, Hibernian recorded notable victories against Barcelona (1960–61), Napoli (1967–68) and Sporting CP (1972–73). Since the late 1970s, Hibernian have qualified for European competition much less frequently. During the 2000s they appeared three times in the Intertoto Cup, a summer competition that offered qualification for the UEFA Cup. The club most recently participated in the 2026–27 Conference League, losing in the play-off round against Gent.

== History ==
=== 1955–1961: Pioneers ===
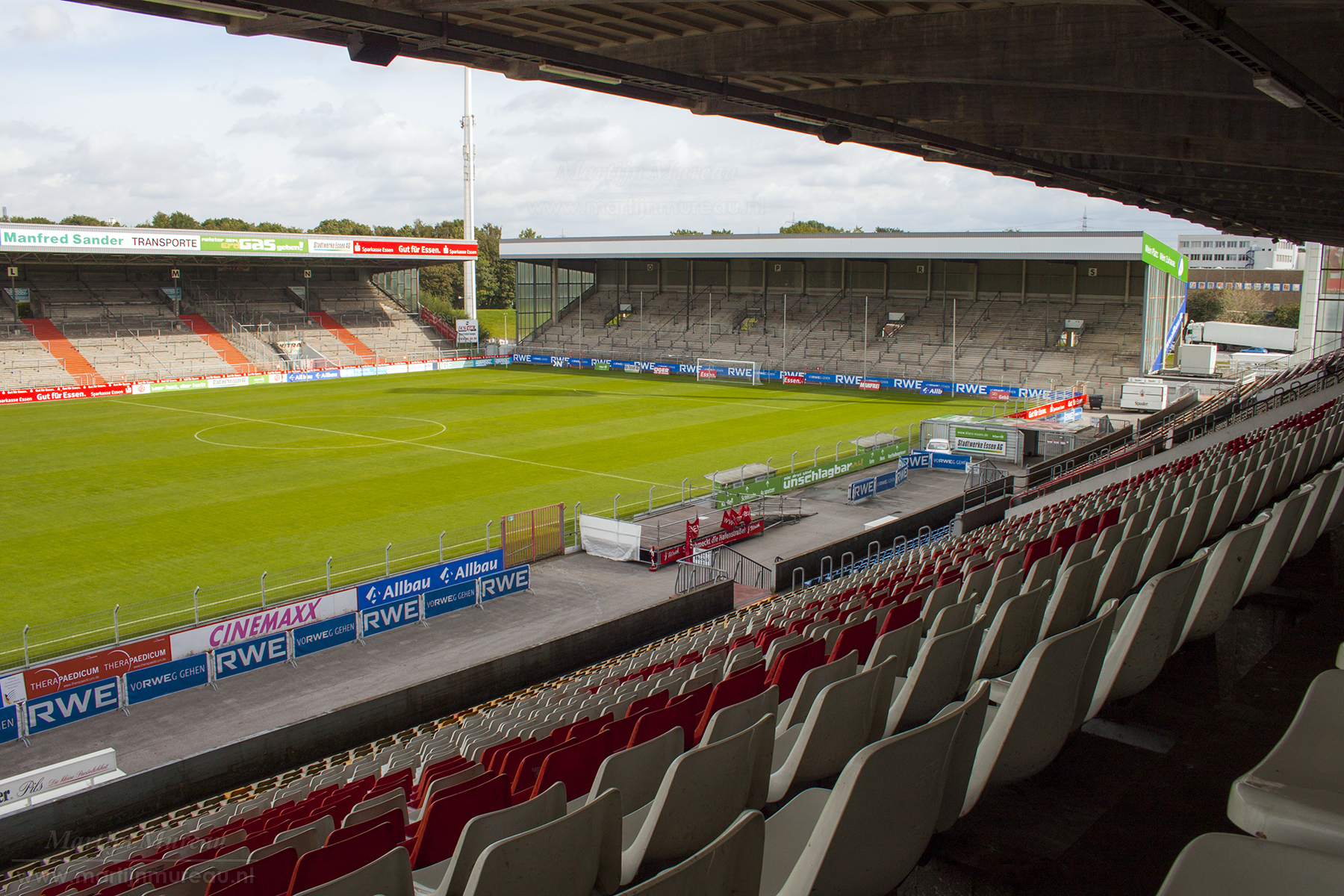
Hibernian played their first European match on 14 September 1955, against Rot-Weiss Essen at the Georg-Melches-Stadion. The clubs played a friendly in July 2005 to mark the 50th anniversary of their entry into European competition.

The first officially sanctioned European club tournament, the European Champion Clubs' Cup, was launched in 1955. Conceived by Gabriel Hanot, the editor of L'Équipe, as a competition for winners of the European national football leagues, it is considered the most prestigious European football competition. Hibernian had only finished fifth in the 1954–55 Scottish league, but were one of the 16 sides invited to take part in the tournament's first season. As there was no English representative in the first competition, Hibernian also became the first British club to participate in European club competition. In their first tie, Hibernian defeated Rot-Weiss Essen (West Germany) thanks to a comfortable win in the away leg. Swedish club Djurgården were their next opponents, but they were unable to play the home match in Stockholm due to adverse winter weather. Both legs were played in Scotland, with the Djurgardens "home" venue being Firhill. Hibernian won 3–1 in Glasgow and 1–0 at Easter Road to progress to the semi-finals. At that stage they were drawn with French club Reims, who won 3–0 on aggregate to progress to the final (which Reims lost 4–3 to Real Madrid).

The Inter-Cities Fairs Cup, which is treated as an unofficial European competition as it was not operated by UEFA, was also established in 1955. Hibernian became the first Scottish club to participate in that competition, in 1960. After a walkover victory against Swiss club Lausanne, Hibernian faced Spanish giants Barcelona in the quarter-final. The first leg in the Camp Nou ended in a 4–4 draw, after Hibernian had twice led by two goals. In the return leg at Easter Road, a late penalty kick by Bobby Kinloch gave Hibernian a 3–2 win on the night and a 7–6 victory on aggregate. In the semi-final, Hibernian faced Italian side Roma. They drew 2–2 at Easter Road and 3–3 in Rome, but the away goals rule did not apply at that time and a playoff match was required. The playoff was also played in Rome, which Roma won 6–0 as they went on to win the tournament.

=== 1961–1979: Regulars ===
Through most of the 1960s and the 1970s, Hibernian were regular participants in European competition. Wins against select teams from Copenhagen (Stævnet) and Utrecht put Hibernian into the quarter-finals of the 1962–63 Fairs Cup, where they lost 6–2 on aggregate to Valencia. In the 1965–66 Fairs Cup, Hibernian met Valencia again with each team winning their home game 2–0; Valencia progressed after they won a playoff match.

Hibernian defeated Portuguese club Porto in the first round of the 1967–68 Fairs Cup, but then lost 4–1 to Napoli in the second round first leg. Napoli were the league leaders in Italy at the time, had only conceded five goals in their last six matches and had legendary goalkeeper Dino Zoff in their lineup. Despite this, Hibernian overwhelmed their Italian opponents and won 5–0 at Easter Road to win the tie 6–4 on aggregate. In the following round, Hibernian were beaten 2–1 on aggregate by Leeds United.

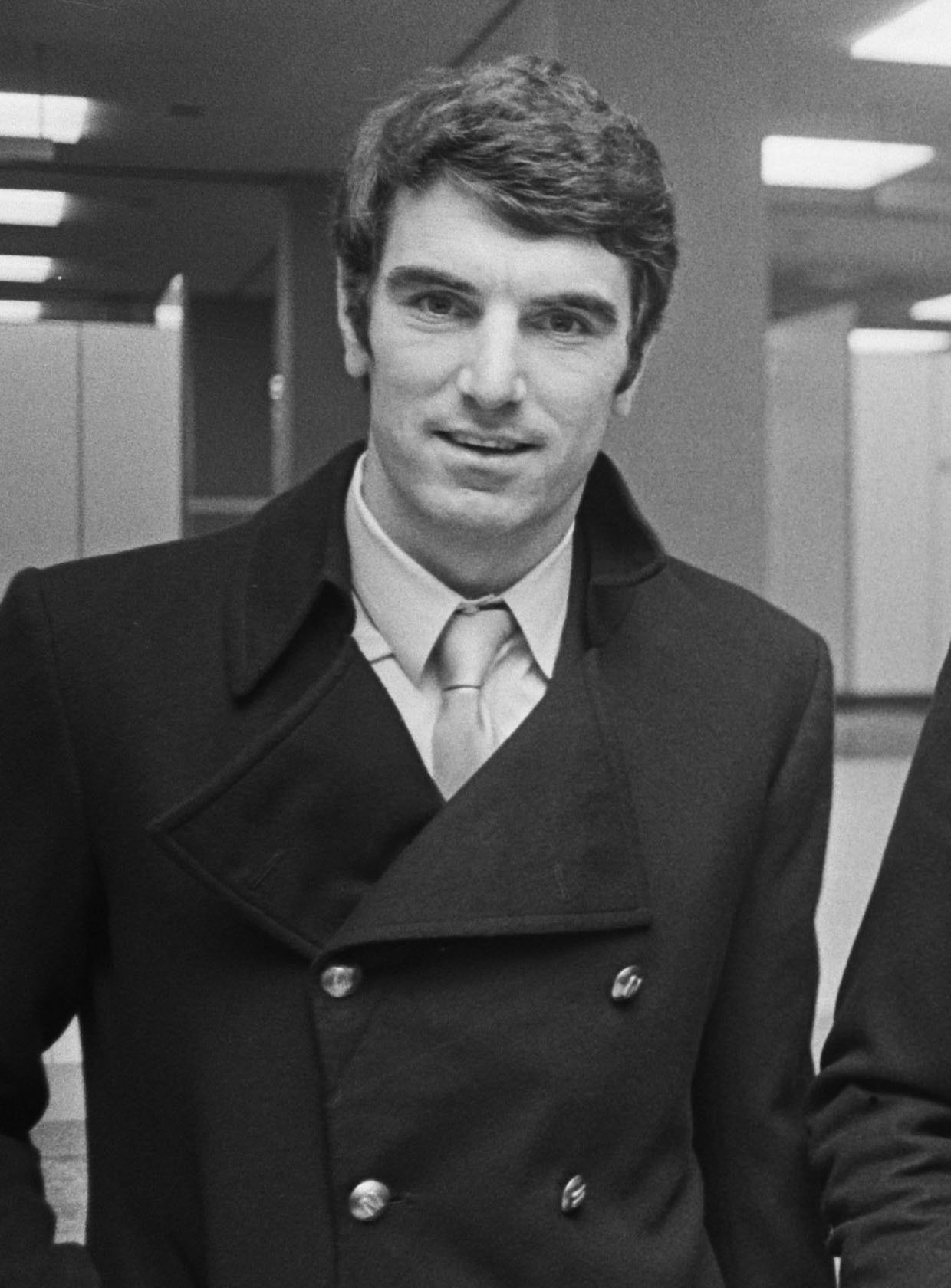
Italian goalkeeper Dino Zoff (pictured in 1970) conceded five goals at Easter Road as Hibernian defeated Napoli in the 1967–68 Fairs Cup.

Wins against Olimpija Ljubljana and Lokomotive Leipzig in the 1968–69 Fairs Cup pushed Hibernian into a third round tie with Hamburg. Hibernian won 2–1 at home and lost 1–0 in Germany, which meant that they were eliminated by the away goals rule. In the final season (1970–71) of the Fairs Cup, Hibernian defeated Malmo 9–2 and Vitoria Guimaraes 3–2, but were then beaten 3–0 by English side Liverpool. Joe McBride scored a hat-trick in the home leg against Malmo, which set a club record for goals scored in European competition.

Hibernian entered the European Cup Winners' Cup for the first (and only) time in 1972–73, as the Scottish Cup winners (Celtic) had also won the league championship. They faced Portuguese club Sporting in the first round, and lost 2–1 in the first leg in Lisbon. Hibernian scored first in the return leg through Alan Gordon. Sporting equalised before half-time, but five goals without reply in the second half gave Hibernian a 6–1 victory on the night and 7–3 on aggregate. Jimmy O'Rourke scored a hat-trick in what was Sporting's heaviest defeat in European competition at that time. Another emphatic home win, 7–1 against Albanian club KS Besa, put Hibernian into the quarter-finals. Hibernian won 4–2 at Easter Road in the first leg against Hajduk Split, but a 3–0 defeat in Yugoslavia knocked them out of the tournament.

UEFA had taken over the operation of the Fairs Cup in 1971 and rebranded it as the UEFA Cup. Hibernian entered this competition for the first time in 1973–74. After a 3–1 aggregate win against Icelandic club Keflavík in the first round, Hibernian met Leeds United for a second time. Both games ended goalless, and Leeds won the tie after a penalty shootout. Norwegian club Rosenborg were the first round opposition in the 1974–75 UEFA Cup. After a 3–2 win in Norway, three goals in four minutes started a 9–1 rout for Hibernian (and a club record defeat for Rosenborg) in the second leg. They would progress to the second round, where they lost 8–2 to Italian club Juventus.

In the 1975–76 UEFA Cup, Hibernian were paired with English side Liverpool in the first round. A Joe Harper goal gave Hibernian a 1–0 win in the first leg at home, but Ray Clemence saved a penalty that could have given Hibernian a two-goal lead. This moment was to prove crucial, as Liverpool won 3–1 at Anfield to narrowly win the tie on aggregate. Liverpool went on to win the competition, with that first leg loss against being their only defeat en route. In the following season, Hibernian managed to squeeze through 1–0 in the first round of the UEFA Cup against French side Sochaux. A 2–0 home win against Swedish club Öster raised hopes of further progress, but that lead was overturned by a 4–1 defeat in the return leg.

Manager Eddie Turnbull enjoyed success with Hibernian and guided them to several European entries during the 1970s. The last of these was in the 1978–79 UEFA Cup, where they defeated Norrkoping 3–2 at home and this lead was preserved as the Swedes were held to a goalless draw in the second leg. Hibernian had been known for their attacking play under Turnbull, but he adopted more defensive tactics this season. This proved unsuccessful in the second round, as Hibernian lost 2–0 in Strasbourg. A 1–0 win for Hibernian in the return leg was therefore insufficient, and it was to be the club's last involvement in European football for 11 years.

=== 1979–present: Sporadic appearances ===
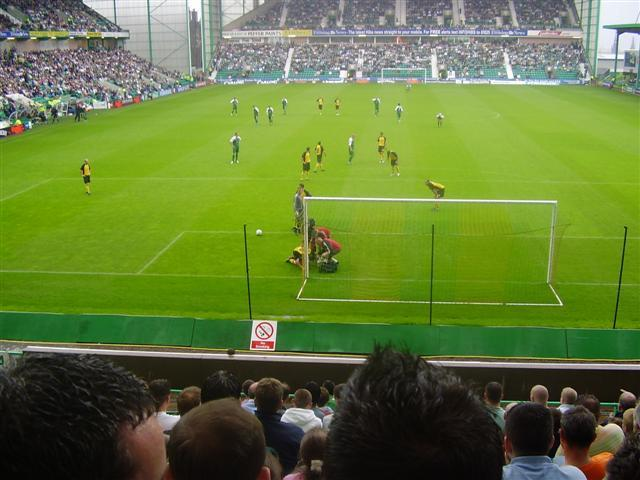
Hibs played Latvian club Dinaburg in the 2006 Intertoto Cup.

Since 1979, Hibernian have qualified for European competition much less frequently. They did not qualify at all for most of the 1980s, as the New Firm of Aberdeen and Dundee United enjoyed success domestically and in Europe. Their next participation came in the 1989–90 UEFA Cup, where Hibernian won 3–0 in Hungary (and 4–0 on aggregate) against Videoton in the first round. The second round tie with Belgian club Liège went into extra time after two goalless draws. Keith Houchen had missed a penalty kick in the first leg, and this proved costly as Liège scored the only goal of the tie during the additional period. Victory in the 1991–92 Scottish League Cup qualified Hibernian for the 1992–93 UEFA Cup, where they were paired with Belgian opposition again. Anderlecht scored two away goals in a 2–2 draw at Easter Road, and a 1–1 draw in the return game meant that Hibernian went out on the away goals rule.

Hibernian next qualified for European competition in 2001, having finished third in the 2000–01 Scottish Premier League. They entered the 2001–02 UEFA Cup and were drawn against Greek club AEK Athens. The first leg in Greece, which was postponed by a week due to the September 11 attacks against the United States, ended in a 2–0 defeat for Hibernian. A strong performance in the return leg gave them a 2–0 lead, equalising the aggregate score. Paco Luna missed a chance to score a third and tie-winning goal late in normal time, and the tie entered an extra period. Two away goals gave AEK an aggregate win, although Hibernian won 3–2 on the night. Despite exiting the competition, the home game against AEK was fondly remembered by the Hibernian supporters; the actor Dougray Scott later named it as his favourite match.

During the 2000s, Hibernian also volunteered to enter the Intertoto Cup on three occasions. This offered a potential backdoor route into the UEFA Cup, but the fixtures being played in early July meant that Hibernian had to start their pre-season training earlier than other Scottish clubs. The games themselves also fell early in pre-season, and they lost in the 2004 competition to Lithuanian club Vetra. They played a friendly match against Rot-Weiss Essen in July 2005 to mark the 50th anniversary of the clubs' first match in European competition. Hibernian had finished third in the league and qualified for the 2005–06 UEFA Cup. In the opening round, they held Ukrainian club Dnipro Dnipropetrovsk to a goalless draw at home but fell to a 5–1 defeat in the return leg.

After further entries in the Intertoto Cup were ended by Odense (2006) and Elfsborg (2008), Hibernian next qualified properly for European competition in 2010. By then, the Intertoto Cup had been abolished and the UEFA Cup had been rebranded as the Europa League. In the 2010–11 competition, Hibernian were defeated home and away by Slovenian club Maribor in the third qualifying round. Hibernian lost 7–0 at Easter Road to Swedish club Malmo in the 2013–14 Europa League qualifiers. The aggregate score of 9–0 was a record defeat for a Scottish club in European competition, surpassing the 12–4 defeat suffered by Rangers in 1959–60.

Having won the 2015–16 Scottish Cup, Hibernian entered the 2016–17 Europa League qualifiers. They lost 1–0 at home to Danish club Brondby, but a David Gray goal gave Hibernian a 1–0 win in Copenhagen. This forced the tie into a goalless period of extra time, and Brondby progressed to the next round by winning 5–3 on penalties. Hibernian next qualified for the Europa League in 2018–19 and progressed through qualifying rounds against Runavík and Asteras Tripolis, before losing in the third round to Molde. After finishing third in the 2020–21 Scottish Premiership, Hibs entered the newly-established Europa Conference League in 2021–22, beating Andorrans Santa Coloma before losing to Croatian side Rijeka. A fifth place finish in 2022–23, meant another qualification for the Europa Conference League in 2023–24. Hibs progressed to the playoff round by beating Andorrans Inter Club d'Escaldes and Swiss club Luzern, but then suffered an 8–0 aggregate defeat against Premier League club Aston Villa.

Hibs finished third in the 2024–25 Premiership, giving them a place in the Europa League qualifiers. A surprise victory for Aberdeen against league champions Celtic in the 2025 Scottish Cup final meant that Hibs entered in the second qualifying round, rather than the play-off round. A series of dramatic ties followed, all decided in periods of extra time, where Hibs lost to Danish side Midtjylland, defeated Serbian club Partizan in the Conference League third qualifying round, but then lost in the play-off round of that competition to Polish side Legia Warsaw. After finishing fifth in 2025–26 Hibs reached the play-off round of the Conference League again, but were eliminated by Belgian side Gent.

== Overall record ==
As of match played on 20 August 2026

Competition	Pld	W	D	L	GF	GA	GD	W%
UEFA competitions
European Cup / Champions League	6	3	1	2	9	5	+4	50.00
UEFA Cup / Europa League	42	15	12	15	59	66	−7	35.71
Cup Winners' Cup	6	3	1	2	19	10	+9	50.00
Conference League	20	7	5	8	35	35	+0	35.00
Intertoto Cup	8	3	1	4	11	8	+3	37.50
Total	82	31	20	31	133	124	+9	37.80
Non-UEFA competitions
Inter-Cities Fairs Cup	36	18	5	13	66	60	+6	50.00
Overall total	118	49	25	44	199	184	+15	41.53

=== By country ===
==== UEFA competitions ====
Result summary by country
Country	Pld	W	D	L	GF	GA	GD	W%
Albania	2	1	1	0	8	2	+6	50.00
Andorra	4	3	0	1	12	4	+8	75.00
Belgium	6	0	4	2	5	7	−2	0.00
Croatia	2	0	1	1	2	5	−3	0.00
Denmark	6	2	1	3	5	6	−1	33.33
England	6	1	2	3	2	11	−9	16.67
Faroe Islands	2	2	0	0	12	5	+7	100.00
France	6	2	1	3	2	5	−3	33.33
Germany	2	1	1	0	5	1	+4	50.00
Greece	4	2	1	1	7	7	+0	50.00
Hungary	2	2	0	0	4	0	+4	100.00
Iceland	2	1	1	0	3	1	+2	50.00
Italy	2	0	0	2	2	8	−6	0.00
Kosovo	2	1	0	1	4	3	+1	50.00
Latvia	2	2	0	0	8	0	+8	100.00
Lithuania	2	0	1	1	1	2	−1	0.00
North Macedonia	2	1	1	0	2	1	+1	50.00
Norway	4	2	1	1	12	6	+6	50.00
Poland	2	0	1	1	4	5	−1	0.00
Portugal	2	1	0	1	7	3	+4	50.00
Serbia	2	1	0	1	4	3	+1	50.00
Slovenia	2	0	0	2	2	6	−4	0.00
Sweden	10	4	1	5	10	20	−10	40.00
Switzerland	2	1	1	0	5	3	+2	50.00
Ukraine	2	0	1	1	1	5	−4	0.00
(Socialist Federal Republic of Yugoslavia) Yugoslavia	2	1	0	1	4	5	−1	50.00
Total	82	31	20	31	133	124	+9	37.80

==== Non-UEFA competitions ====
Result summary by country (Non-UEFA competitions)
Country	Pld	W	D	L	GF	GA	GD	W%
Denmark	2	2	0	0	7	2	+5	100.00
East Germany	2	2	0	0	4	1	+3	100.00
England	4	0	1	3	1	5	−4	0.00
Germany	2	1	0	1	2	2	+0	50.00
Italy	5	1	2	2	11	15	−4	20.00
Netherlands	2	2	0	0	3	1	+2	100.00
Portugal	6	3	1	2	13	9	+4	50.00
Spain	7	3	1	3	11	17	−6	42.86
Sweden	2	2	0	0	9	2	+7	100.00
(Socialist Federal Republic of Yugoslavia) Yugoslavia	4	2	0	2	5	6	−1	50.00
Total	36	18	5	13	66	60	+6	50.00

==== Top goalscorers ====
Rank	Player	Career	Goals	Ref.
1	(Australia) Martin Boyle	2015–present	10	
2	(Scotland) Alan Gordon	1971–1975	8	
2	(Scotland) Joe McBride	1968–1971	8	
2	(Scotland) Pat Stanton	1963–1977	8	
5	(Scotland) Arthur Duncan	1969–1984	7	
6	(England) Joe Baker	1957–1961	6	
6	(Scotland) Jimmy O'Rourke	1962–1974	6	

== Matches ==
The number of goals scored by Hibernian is on the left in each instance.

List of Hibernian matches in European competitions
Season	Competition	Round	Opponent	Home	Away	Other	Agg.	(Note: Round or group progressed or eliminated)	Notes	Ref.
1955–56	European Cup	1R	(West Germany) Rot-Weiss Essen	1–1	4–0	—N/a	5–1		—N/a	
1955–56	European Cup	QF	(Sweden) Djurgården IF	1–0	3–1	—N/a	4–1		—N/a	
1955–56	European Cup	SF	(France) Reims	0–1	0–2	—N/a	0–3		—N/a	
1960–61	Fairs Cup	1R	(Switzerland) Lausanne-Sport	—N/a		—N/a	—N/a		Walkover	
1960–61	Fairs Cup	QF	(Spain) Barcelona	3–2	4–4	—N/a	7–6		—N/a	
1960–61	Fairs Cup	SF	(Italy) Roma	2–2	3–3	0–6	5–11		Playoff	
1961–62	Fairs Cup	1R	(Portugal) Belenenses	3–3	3–1	—N/a	6–4		—N/a	
1961–62	Fairs Cup	2R	(Socialist Federal Republic of Yugoslavia) Red Star Belgrade	0–1	0–4	—N/a	0–5		—N/a	
1962–63	Fairs Cup	1R	(Denmark) Stævnet	4–0	3–2	—N/a	7–2		—N/a	
1962–63	Fairs Cup	2R	(Netherlands) Utrecht XI	2–1	1–0	—N/a	3–1		—N/a	
1962–63	Fairs Cup	QF	(Spain) Valencia	2–1	0–5	—N/a	2–6		—N/a	
1965–66	Fairs Cup	1R	(Spain) Valencia	2–0	0–2	0–3	2–5		Playoff	
1967–68	Fairs Cup	1R	(Portugal) Porto	3–0	1–3	—N/a	4–3		—N/a	
1967–68	Fairs Cup	2R	(Italy) Napoli	5–0	1–4	—N/a	6–4		—N/a	
1967–68	Fairs Cup	QF	(England) Leeds United	1–1	0–1	—N/a	1–2		—N/a	
1968–69	Fairs Cup	1R	(Socialist Federal Republic of Yugoslavia) Olimpija Ljubljana	2–1	3–0	—N/a	5–1		—N/a	
1968–69	Fairs Cup	2R	(East Germany) Lokomotive Leipzig	3–1	1–0	—N/a	4–1		—N/a	
1968–69	Fairs Cup	3R	(West Germany) Hamburg	2–1	0–1	—N/a	2–2		Away goals	
1970–71	Fairs Cup	1R	(Sweden) Malmö FF	6–0	3–2	—N/a	9–2		—N/a	
1970–71	Fairs Cup	2R	(Portugal) Vitória de Guimarães	2–0	1–2	—N/a	3–2		—N/a	
1970–71	Fairs Cup	3R	(England) Liverpool	0–1	0–2	—N/a	0–3		—N/a	
1972–73	Cup Winners' Cup	1R	(Portugal) Sporting CP	6–1	1–2	—N/a	7–3		—N/a	
1972–73	Cup Winners' Cup	2R	(Albania) KS Besa	7–1	1–1	—N/a	8–2		—N/a	
1972–73	Cup Winners' Cup	QF	(Socialist Federal Republic of Yugoslavia) Hajduk Split	4–2	0–3	—N/a	4–5		—N/a	
1973–74	UEFA Cup	1R	(Iceland) Keflavík	2–0	1–1	—N/a	3–1		—N/a	
1973–74	UEFA Cup	2R	(England) Leeds United	0–0	0–0	—N/a	0–0		Penalties	
1974–75	UEFA Cup	1R	(Norway) Rosenborg	9–1	3–2	—N/a	12–3		—N/a	
1974–75	UEFA Cup	2R	(Italy) Juventus	2–4	0–4	—N/a	2–8		—N/a	
1975–76	UEFA Cup	1R	(England) Liverpool	1–0	1–3	—N/a	2–3		—N/a	
1976–77	UEFA Cup	1R	(France) Sochaux	1–0	0–0	—N/a	1–0		—N/a	
1976–77	UEFA Cup	2R	(Sweden) Öster	2–0	1–4	—N/a	3–4		—N/a	
1978–79	UEFA Cup	1R	(Sweden) IFK Norrköping	3–2	0–0	—N/a	3–2		—N/a	
1978–79	UEFA Cup	2R	(France) Strasbourg	1–0	0–2	—N/a	1–2		—N/a	
1989–90	UEFA Cup	1R	(Hungary) Videoton	1–0	3–0	—N/a	4–0		—N/a	
1989–90	UEFA Cup	2R	(Belgium) RFC de Liège	0–0	0–1	—N/a	0–1		Extra time	
1992–93	UEFA Cup	1R	(Belgium) Anderlecht	2–2	1–1	—N/a	3–3		Away goals	
2001–02	UEFA Cup	1R	(Greece) AEK Athens	3–2	0–2	—N/a	3–4		Extra time	
2004–05	Intertoto Cup	2R	(Lithuania) Vėtra	1–1	0–1	—N/a	1–2		—N/a	
2005–06	UEFA Cup	1R	(Ukraine) Dnipro Dnipropetrovsk	0–0	1–5	—N/a	1–5		—N/a	
2006–07	Intertoto Cup	2R	(Latvia) Dinaburg	5–0	3–0	—N/a	8–0		—N/a	
2006–07	Intertoto Cup	3R	(Denmark) Odense	2–1	0–1	—N/a	2–2		Away goals	
2008–09	Intertoto Cup	2R	(Sweden) IF Elfsborg	0–2	0–2	—N/a	0–4		—N/a	
2010–11	Europa League	3QR	(Slovenia) Maribor	2–3	0–3	—N/a	2–6		—N/a	
2013–14	Europa League	2QR	(Sweden) Malmö FF	0–7	0–2	—N/a	0–9		—N/a	
2016–17	Europa League	2QR	(Denmark) Brøndby	0–1	1–0	—N/a	1–1		Penalties	
2018–19	Europa League	1QR	(Faroe Islands) Runavík	6–1	6–4	—N/a	12–5		—N/a	
2018–19	Europa League	2QR	(Greece) Asteras Tripolis	3–2	1–1	—N/a	4–3		—N/a	
2018–19	Europa League	3QR	(Norway) Molde	0–0	0–3	—N/a	0–3		—N/a	
2021–22	Europa Conference League	2QR	(Andorra) Santa Coloma	3–0	2–1	—N/a	5–1		—N/a	
2021–22	Europa Conference League	3QR	(Croatia) Rijeka	1–1	1−4	—N/a	2−5		—N/a	
2023–24	Europa Conference League	2QR	(Andorra) Inter Club d'Escaldes	6–1	1–2	—N/a	7–3		—N/a	
2023–24	Europa Conference League	3QR	(Switzerland) Luzern	3–1	2–2	—N/a	5–3		—N/a	
2023–24	Europa Conference League	PO	(England) Aston Villa	0–5	0–3	—N/a	0–8		—N/a	
2025–26	Europa League	2QR	(Denmark) Midtjylland	1–2	1–1	—N/a	2–3		Extra time	
2025–26	Conference League	3QR	(Serbia) Partizan	2–3	2–0	—N/a	4–3		Extra time	
2025–26	Conference League	PO	(Poland) Legia Warsaw	1–2	3–3	—N/a	4–5		Extra time	
2026–27	Conference League	2QR	(Kosovo) Malisheva	4–1	0–2	—N/a	4–3		—N/a	
2026–27	Conference League	3QR	(North Macedonia) Shkëndija	2–1	0–0	—N/a	2–1		—N/a	
2026–27	Conference League	PO	(Belgium) Gent	2–3	0–0	—N/a	2–3		—N/a	
