= 1965–66 Hibernian F.C. season =

Hibernian
1965–66 season
- Manager: Bob Shankly
- Scottish First Division: 6th
- Scottish Cup: R2
- Scottish League Cup: SF
- Inter-Cities Fairs Cup: R1
- Highest home attendance: 37,288 (v Rangers, 16 October)
- Lowest home attendance: 3861 (v Clyde, 23 March)
- Average home league attendance: 11,955 (down 1905)

During the 1965–66 season Hibernian, a football club based in Edinburgh, Scotland, came sixth out of 18 clubs in the Scottish First Division.

== Scottish First Division ==
Match Day	Date	Opponent	H/A	Score	Hibernian Scorer(s)	Attendance
1	25 August	Morton	A	5–1	Cormack, Quinn, Scott, Martin (2)	6,700
2	11 September	Kilmarnock	H	3–3	Cormack, Scott, Martin	13,385
3	18 September	Heart of Midlothian	A	4–0	O'Rourke (2), Stevenson (2)	22,369
4	25 September	Falkirk	H	5–1	Scott, Martin (4)	10,650
5	2 October	Clyde	A	2–1	McNamee, Baxter	4,310
6	9 October	Motherwell	H	2–2	Martin, Davis (pen.)	13,511
7	16 October	Rangers	H	1–2	Stevenson	37,288
8	23 October	St Mirren	A	2–0	Davis (pen.), Stevenson J.	3,068
9	30 October	Partick Thistle	A	2–3	Quinn, Cormack	5,874
10	6 November	Hamilton Academical	H	11–1	Davis, Hogg, Cormack, Scott (2), O'Rourke (2), Stevenson (3)	6,319
11	13 November	Dundee	A	3–4	Stanton, O'Rourke, Stevenson	11,948
12	20 November	Stirling Albion	A	2–1	Davis (pen.), Cormack	3,579
13	27 November	Dunfermline Athletic	H	1–1	O'Rourke	11,587
14	11 December	Celtic	A	0–2		21,057
14	18 December	St Johnstone	H	3–0	Cormack, Cousin, O'Rourke	6,363
15	25 December	Aberdeen	A	3–1	McNamee, Scott, Cormack	9,535
17	1 January	Heart of Midlothian	H	2–3	Cormack (2)	32,192
18	3 January	Kilmarnock	A	0–1		11,298
19	8 January	Morton	H	4–1	O'Rourke (2), Cormack (2)	9,214
20	15 January	Falkirk	A	2–3	Stein (2)	4,462
21	29 January	Motherwell	A	0–4		3,375
22	12 February	Rangers	A	0–2		27,569
23	26 February	Partick Thistle	H	2–0	Cormack, Stein	6,597
24	2 March	St Mirren	H	3–2	Grant, Stein, Cormack	4,874
25	5 March	Hamilton Academical	A	2–1	Grant, O.G.	1,185
26	12 March	Dundee	H	1–1	Cousin	8,302
27	19 March	Stirling Albion	H	1–0	Peter Cormack	4,188
28	23 March	Clyde	H	3–1	Davis (pen.), O'Rourke, Stein	3,861
29	6 April	Dunfermline Athletic	A	2–3	Davis (pen.), Stevenson	4,715
30	9 April	Dundee United	A	4–5	Davis (2, 1 pen.), Stanton, Cormack	4,706
31	16 April	Celtic	H	0–0		24,030
32	20 April	Dundee United	H	3–3	Stein, Stevenson, O.G.	4,568
33	23 April	St Johnstone	A	3–1	Stein, Scott, Stevenson	3,385
34	30 April	Aberdeen	H	0–1		6,301

=== Final League table ===
P	Team	Pld	W	D	L	GF	GA	GD	Pts
5	Dundee United	34	19	5	10	79	51	28	43
6	Hibernian	34	16	6	12	81	55	26	38
6	Heart of Midlothian	34	13	12	9	56	48	8	38

=== Scottish League Cup ===
==== Group stage ====
Round	Date	Opponent	H/A	Score	Hibernian Scorer(s)	Attendance
G4	14 August	Falkirk	A	1–3	Scott	6,174
G4	18 August	St Mirren	H	1–0	Stevenson	8,372
G4	21 August	Morton	A	4–2	McNamee, Baxter, Scott, Martin	7,798
G4	28 August	Falkirk	H	3–1	McNamee, Quinn (pen.), Martin	10,704
G4	1 September	St Mirren	A	3–0	Cormack, Scott (2)	7,091
G4	4 September	Morton	H	3–0	Cormack, Martin, Stevenson	9,269

==== Group 4 final table ====
P	Team	Pld	W	D	L	GF	GA	GD	Pts
1	Hibernian	6	5	0	1	15	6	9	10
2	Falkirk	6	3	1	2	11	10	1	7
3	St Mirren	6	2	0	4	5	9	–4	4
4	Morton	6	1	1	4	7	13	–6	3

==== Knockout stage ====
Round	Date	Opponent	H/A	Score	Hibernian Scorer(s)	Attendance
QF L1	15 September	Alloa Athletic	A	2–0	Quinn, Martin	3,513
QF L2	22 September	Alloa Athletic	H	11–2	Davis (pen.), Quinn, Scott (4), Martin (4), Stevenson	6,407
SF	4 October	Celtic	N	2–2	Martin (2)	46,074
SF R	18 October	Celtic	N	0–4		51,023

=== Scottish Cup ===
Round	Date	Opponent	H/A	Score	Hibernian Scorer(s)	Attendance
R1	5 February	Third Lanark	H	4–3	Davis (pen.), Cousin, Scott, O'Rourke	5,441
R2	21 February	Heart of Midlothian	A	1–2	McNamee	31,244

=== Inter-Cities Fairs Cup ===
Round	Date	Opponent	H/A	Score	Hibernian Scorer(s)	Attendance
R1 L1	8 September	(Spain) Valencia CF	H	2–0	Scott, McNamee	19,000
R1 L2	12 October	(Spain) Valencia CF	A	0–2		44,000
R1 R	3 November	(Spain) Valencia CF	A	0–3		43,100

== See also ==
- List of Hibernian F.C. seasons
