= 1967–68 Hibernian F.C. season =

Hibernian
1967–68 season
- Manager: Bob Shankly
- Scottish First Division: 3rd
- Scottish Cup: R2
- Scottish League Cup: GS
- Inter-Cities Fairs Cup: R3
- Highest home attendance: 38,077 (v Celtic, 20 January)
- Lowest home attendance: 3577 (v Dunfermline Athletic, 14 October)
- Average home league attendance: 11,960 (down 836)

During the 1967–68 season Hibernian, a football club based in Edinburgh, came third out of 18 clubs in the Scottish First Division.

== Scottish First Division ==
Match Day	Date	Opponent	H/A	Score	Hibernian Scorer(s)	Attendance
1	9 September	Heart of Midlothian	A	4–1	Quinn (3), Cormack	20,773
2	16 September	Raith Rovers	H	3–0	Cormack, Stein, O.G.	7,603
3	23 September	Dundee United	H	2–2	Davis (pen.), Stein	7,716
4	30 September	Partick Thistle	H	5–1	Davis (pen.), McGraw, Quinn, Stevenson (2)	4,776
5	7 October	Celtic	A	0-4		36,104
6	14 October	Dunfermline Athletic	H	2-0	Cormack, O.G.	3,577
7	21 October	St Johnstone	A	3–2	Stein (2), Stevenson	5,516
8	28 October	Airdireonians	H	5–0	Stein (3), Cormack. O.G.	7,488
9	4 November	Stirling Albion	A	1-4	Stein	2,979
10	11 November	Dundee	A	4-1	McGraw, Stein (2), Cormack	7,070
11	18 November	Aberdeen	H	1–0	Cormack	11,175
12	25 November	Rangers	A	0–2		44,556
13	2 December	Morton	H	0–1		8,557
14	16 December	Motherwell	A	1–0	Stein	4,444
14	23 December	Falkirk	H	1–1	McGraw	6,553
15	30 December	Kilmarnock	A	0-1		6,460
17	1 January	Heart of Midlothian	H	1–0	Davis (pen.)	32,360
18	2 January	Raith Rovers	A	2–2	Grant, Cormack	6,019
19	6 January	Dundee United	H	3–0	Quinn, Stein (2)	9,285
20	13 January	Partick Thistle	A	2–1	Davis (pen.), Stevenson	6,878
21	20 January	Celtic	H	0–2		38,077
22	3 February	Dunfermline Athletic	A	1–0	Marinello	11,740
23	10 February	St Johnstone	H	4–2	Davis (pen.), Stein, Cormack (2)	7,560
24	2 March	Stirling Albion	H	5–2	O'Rourke (2), Stein, Stevenson, McGraw	5,221
25	6 March	Airdrieonians	A	2–1	Stein, O.G.	2,221
26	9 March	Dundee	H	2–0	Cormack, Stevenson	8,467
27	16 March	Aberdeen	A	0–5		6,480
28	23 March	Rangers	H	1–3	Stevenson	27,195
29	6 April	Clyde	A	2–2	Stein, Stevenson	1,845
30	10 April	Morton	A	0–2		4,474
31	13 April	Motherwell	H	2–1	Cormack, Stevenson	6,596
32	20 April	Falkirk	A	3–2	Stein, O'Rourke, Davis (pen.)	3,376
33	24 April	Clyde	H	2–1	Davis (pen.), O'Rourke	4,182
34	27 April	Kilmarnock	H	3–3	Stein (3)	4,688

=== Final League table ===
P	Team	Pld	W	D	L	GF	GA	GD	Pts
2	Rangers	34	28	5	1	93	34	59	61
3	Hibernian	34	20	5	9	67	49	18	45
4	Dunfermline Athletic	34	17	5	12	64	41	23	39

=== Scottish League Cup ===
==== Group stage ====
Round	Date	Opponent	H/A	Score	Hibernian Scorer(s)	Attendance
G1	12 August	Dundee	A	0–0		12,681
G1	16 August	Motherwell	H	1–0	Grant	7,934
G1	19 August	Clyde	H	3–1	Davis (pen.), Grant, Cormack	9,906
G1	26 August	Dundee	H	2–4	Davis (pen.), Stein	13,317
G1	30 August	Motherwell	A	1–2	Murphy	1,894
G1	2 September	Clyde	A	2–0	Stein, Cormack	1,575

==== Group 1 final table ====
P	Team	Pld	W	D	L	GF	GA	GD	Pts
1	Dundee	6	5	1	0	14	6	8	11
2	Hibernian	6	3	1	2	9	7	2	7
3	Motherwell	6	1	1	4	8	13	–5	3
4	Clyde	6	1	1	4	6	11	–5	3

=== Scottish Cup ===
Round	Date	Opponent	H/A	Score	Hibernian Scorer(s)	Attendance
R1	27 January	East Stirlingshire	A	5–3	Stein (3), Davis (pen.), Cormack	3,472
R2	17 February	Airdrieonians	A	0–1		10,314

=== Inter-Cities Fairs Cup ===
Round	Date	Opponent	H/A	Score	Hibernian Scorer(s)	Attendance
R1 L1	20 September	(Portugal) FC Porto	H	3–0	Cormack (2), Stevenson	14,200
R1 L2	4 October	(Portugal) FC Porto	A	1–3	Davis (pen.)	40,000
R2 L1	22 November	(Italy) Napoli	A	1–4	Stein	11,000
R2 L2	29 November	(Italy) Napoli	H	5–0	Duncan, Quinn, Cormack, Stanton, Stein	10,000
R3 L1	20 December	(England) Leeds United	A	0–1		31,522
R3 L2	10 January	(England) Leeds United	H	1–1	Stein	30,000

== See also ==
- List of Hibernian F.C. seasons
