= 1969–70 Hibernian F.C. season =

Hibernian
1969–70 season
- Manager: Bob Shankly (to 1 September); Willie McFarlane (from 1 September)
- Scottish First Division: 3rd
- Scottish Cup: R1
- Scottish League Cup: GS
- Highest home attendance: 40,839 (v Celtic, 17 January)
- Lowest home attendance: 3464 (v Motherwell, 29 November)
- Average home league attendance: 13,616 (up 2411)

During the 1969–70 season Hibernian, a football club based in Edinburgh, came third out of 18 clubs in the Scottish First Division.

== Scottish First Division ==
Match Day	Date	Opponent	H/A	Score	Hibernian Scorer(s)	Attendance
1	30 August	Ayr United	A	0–3		6,955
2	3 September	St Mirren	H	2–0	Cormack (2)	7,136
3	6 September	Partick Thistle	H	5–1	Cormack (2, 1 pen.), McBride (3)	7,650
4	13 September	Celtic	A	2–1	Hamilton, Stanton	42,706
5	20 September	Raith Rovers	H	3–1	Marinello, Shevlane, McBride	8,315
6	27 September	Heart of Midlothian	A	2–0	Cormack, McBride	26,807
7	4 October	Morton	H	1–0	Stanton	11,645
8	11 October	Rangers	A	3–1	Marinello (2), McBride	53,912
9	25 October	Kilmarnock	A	2–2	McBride, Cormack	7,608
10	1 November	St Johnstone	A	0–1		7,601
11	8 November	Clyde	H	1–0	O.G.	8,677
12	11 November	Airdrieonians	H	3–1	Graham (2), Cormack	7,262
13	15 November	Dundee United	A	1–0	Marinello	10,623
14	25 November	Dunfermline Athletic	H	3–0	Graham (2), McBride (pen.)	18,761
14	29 November	Motherwell	H	1–1	Graham	3,464
15	13 December	Ayr United	H	4–3	McBride (2 pens.), Stanton (2)	8,896
17	27 December	Dundee	A	0–1		10,466
18	1 January	Heart of Midlothian	H	0–0		36,421
19	3 January	Raith Rovers	A	3–0	Graham (2), Cormack	5,044
20	17 January	Celtic	H	1–2	Duncan	40,839
21	31 January	Partick Thistle	A	1–3	Graham	4,337
22	16 February	Dundee	H	4–1	Stanton, McBride, Duncan (2)	6,409
23	21 February	Morton	A	1–1	McBride	3,340
24	28 February	Rangers	H	2–2	Graham, McBride	31,322
25	3 March	St Mirren	A	3–3	Cormack, Graham, Cropley	3,375
26	7 March	Airdireonians	A	2–3	McBride, Stanton	2,900
27	9 March	Aberdeen	A	2–0	McBride, Cormack	10,815
28	21 March	St Johnstone	H	4–1	McBride (3, 1 pen.), Cormack	5,709
29	25 March	Kilmarnock	H	2–1	Hamilton, Cropley	6,643
30	28 March	Clyde	A	0–1		1,991
31	1 April	Motherwell	A	1–2	Hamilton	4,485
32	4 April	Dundee United	H	3–1	McBride (2 pens.), Grant	5,051
33	13 April	Aberdeen	H	1–2	Stevenson	7,262
34	18 April	Dunfermline Athletic	A	2–1	O'Rourke, Murphy	3,925

=== Final League table ===
P	Team	Pld	W	D	L	GF	GA	GD	Pts
2	Rangers	34	19	7	8	67	40	27	45
3	Hibernian	34	19	6	9	65	40	25	44
4	Heart of Midlothian	34	13	12	9	50	36	14	38

=== Scottish League Cup ===
==== Group stage ====
Round	Date	Opponent	H/A	Score	Hibernian Scorer(s)	Attendance
G2	9 August	Clyde	H	4–1	Stanton (pen.), Grant (2), Murphy	8,751
G2	13 August	Dunfermline Athletic	A	1–3	Grant	9,871
G2	16 August	Aberdeen	A	2–2	McBride, Grant	14,437
G2	20 August	Dunfermline Athletic	H	2–0	Stanton, Marinello	13,194
G2	23 August	Clyde	A	1–3	McBride	2,703
G2	27 August	Aberdeen	H	0–0		18,317

==== Group 2 final table ====
P	Team	Pld	W	D	L	GF	GA	GD	Pts
1	Aberdeen	6	2	4	0	8	4	4	8
2	Hibernian	6	2	2	2	10	9	1	6
3	Dunfermline Athletic	6	1	3	2	5	6	–1	5
4	Clyde	6	1	3	2	4	8	–4	5

=== Scottish Cup ===
Round	Date	Opponent	H/A	Score	Hibernian Scorer(s)	Attendance
R1	24 January	Rangers	A	1–3	Graham	73,716

== See also ==
- List of Hibernian F.C. seasons
