= 1970–71 Hibernian F.C. season =

Hibernian
1970–71 season
- Manager: Willie McFarlane to (6 December); Dave Ewing from (6 December)
- Scottish First Division: 12th
- Scottish Cup: SF
- Scottish League Cup: QF
- Inter-Cities Fairs Cup: QF
- Highest home attendance: 37,355 (v Rangers, 9 September)
- Lowest home attendance: 3310 (v Clyde, 24 April)
- Average home league attendance: 10,541 (down 3075)

During the 1970–71 season Hibernian, a football club based in Edinburgh, came twelfth out of 18 clubs in the Scottish First Division, reached the semi-finals of the Scottish Cup and reached the quarter-finals of the Scottish League Cup and Inter-Cities Fairs Cup.

== Scottish First Division ==
| Match Day | Date | Opponent | H/A | Score | Hibernian Scorer(s) | Attendance |
|---|---|---|---|---|---|---|
| 1 | 29 August | Dundee United | A | 1–1 | Stevenson | 8,781 |
| 2 | 5 September | Heart of Midlothian | H | 0–0 | | 23,225 |
| 3 | 12 September | Cowdenbeath | A | 4–1 | McBride, Cropley (2), Hamilton | 6,814 |
| 4 | 19 September | Celtic | H | 2–0 | McBride (2) | 36,423 |
| 5 | 26 September | Aberdeen | A | 0–3 | | 14,702 |
| 6 | 3 October | St Mirren | H | 3–3 | Davidson (2), Duncan | 7,889 |
| 7 | 10 October | Motherwell | A | 0–4 | | 7,650 |
| 8 | 17 October | Ayr United | H | 4–0 | Davidson, McBride, Graham, Duncan | 5,743 |
| 9 | 7 November | Dundee | H | 1–2 | Stanton | 7,210 |
| 10 | 14 November | St Johnstone | A | 1–0 | McBride | 5,681 |
| 11 | 18 November | Morton | A | 1–2 | Duncan | 3,250 |
| 12 | 21 November | Kilmarnock | H | 1–0 | Blair | 6,364 |
| 13 | 25 November | Rangers | H | 3–2 | Graham, Blair (2) | 18,770 |
| 14 | 28 November | Falkirk | A | 0–0 | | 7,933 |
| 14 | 5 December | Airdrieonians | A | 0–2 | | 3,464 |
| 15 | 12 December | Dunfermline Athletic | H | 2–2 | Blair (2) | 5,237 |
| 17 | 19 December | Clyde | A | 0–0 | | 1,930 |
| 18 | 26 December | Dundee United | H | 0–1 | | 5,742 |
| 19 | 1 January | Heart of Midlothian | A | 0–0 | | 27,715 |
| 20 | 2 January | Cowdenbeath | H | 2–2 | Blackley (pen.), Davidson | 7,269 |
| 21 | 9 January | Celtic | A | 1–2 | Stanton | 25,797 |
| 22 | 16 January | Aberdeen | H | 2–1 | Stanton, Baker | 23,402 |
| 23 | 30 January | St Mirren | A | 1–3 | Duncan | 4,840 |
| 24 | 6 February | Motherwell | H | 1–0 | Baker | 7,092 |
| 25 | 20 February | Ayr United | A | 0–2 | | 5,882 |
| 26 | 27 February | Rangers | A | 1–1 | Baker | 30,644 |
| 27 | 10 March | Morton | H | 2–4 | Graham, Baker | 5,051 |
| 28 | 13 March | Dundee | A | 0–1 | | 5,758 |
| 29 | 20 March | St Johnstone | H | 1–2 | O'Rourke (pen.) | 5,607 |
| 30 | 27 March | Kilmarnock | A | 1–4 | Blackley | 4,209 |
| 31 | 3 April | Falkirk | H | 1–3 | Baker | 5,617 |
| 32 | 10 April | Airdrieonians | H | 3–1 | Graham, Baker (2) | 5,247 |
| 33 | 17 April | Dunfermline Athletic | A | 3–3 | O'Rourke (2), Cropley | 5,916 |
| 34 | 24 April | Clyde | H | 5–1 | Hazel, O'Rourke (3, 2 pens.), Baker | 3,310 |

=== Final League table ===
| P | Team | Pld | W | D | L | GF | GA | GD | Pts |
|---|---|---|---|---|---|---|---|---|---|
| 11 | Heart of Midlothian | 34 | 13 | 7 | 14 | 41 | 40 | 1 | 33 |
| 12 | Hibernian | 34 | 10 | 10 | 14 | 47 | 53 | –6 | 30 |
| 13 | Kilmarnock | 34 | 10 | 8 | 16 | 43 | 67 | –24 | 28 |

=== Scottish League Cup ===
==== Group stage ====
| Round | Date | Opponent | H/A | Score | Hibernian Scorer(s) | Attendance |
|---|---|---|---|---|---|---|
| G4 | 8 August | St Johnstone | A | 3–1 | Graham, Duncan, McBride | 5,199 |
| G4 | 12 August | Airdrieonians | H | 3–2 | Duncan (2), McBride | 8,080 |
| G4 | 15 August | Aberdeen | A | 1–1 | Duncan | 15,227 |
| G4 | 19 August | Airdrieonians | A | 4–2 | Stanton (2, 1 pen.), Duncan, McBride | 4,177 |
| G4 | 22 August | St Johnstone | H | 1–1 | Graham | 10,739 |
| G4 | 26 August | Aberdeen | H | 4–0 | Stanton, Graham, Duncan (2), McBride | 24,925 |

==== Group 4 final table ====
| P | Team | Pld | W | D | L | GF | GA | GD | Pts |
|---|---|---|---|---|---|---|---|---|---|
| 1 | Hibernian | 6 | 4 | 2 | 0 | 16 | 7 | 9 | 10 |
| 2 | Aberdeen | 6 | 3 | 2 | 1 | 12 | 10 | 2 | 8 |
| 3 | Airdrieonians | 6 | 2 | 1 | 3 | 10 | 15 | –5 | 5 |
| 4 | St Johnstone | 6 | 0 | 1 | 5 | 3 | 9 | –6 | 1 |

==== Knockout stage ====
| Round | Date | Opponent | H/A | Score | Hibernian Scorer(s) | Attendance |
|---|---|---|---|---|---|---|
| QF L1 | 9 September | Rangers | H | 1–3 | Duncan | 37,355 |
| QF L2 | 23 September | Rangers | A | 1–3 | Graham | 50,646 |

=== Scottish Cup ===
| Round | Date | Opponent | H/A | Score | Hibernian Scorer(s) | Attendance |
|---|---|---|---|---|---|---|
| R3 | 23 January | Forfar Athletic | H | 8–1 | Davidson (2), O'Rourke (3), Duncan, Stevenson, O.G. | 7,316 |
| R4 | 13 February | Heart of Midlothian | A | 2–1 | Hazel, Duncan | 15,980 |
| QF | 6 March | Dundee | H | 1–0 | O'Rourke (pen.) | 21,710 |
| SF | 31 March | Rangers | N | 0–0 | | 69,370 |
| SF R | 5 April | Rangers | N | 1–2 | O'Rourke | 54,435 |

=== Inter-Cities Fairs Cup ===
| Round | Date | Opponent | H/A | Score | Hibernian Scorer(s) | Attendance |
|---|---|---|---|---|---|---|
| R1 L1 | 16 September | (Sweden) Malmö FF | H | 6–0 | Blair, McBride (3), Duncan (2) | 11,165 |
| R1 L2 | 30 September | (Sweden) Malmö FF | A | 3–2 | Duncan B., McEwan, Stanton | 1,900 |
| R2 L1 | 14 October | (Portugal) Vitória de Guimarães | H | 2–0 | Duncan, Stanton | 20,000 |
| R2 L2 | 28 October | (Portugal) Vitória de Guimarães | A | 1–2 | Graham | 20,000 |
| QF L1 | 9 December | (England) Liverpool | H | 0–1 | | 30,296 |
| QF L2 | 22 December | (England) Liverpool | A | 0–2 | | 37,815 |

== See also ==
- List of Hibernian F.C. seasons
