= 1968–69 Hibernian F.C. season =

Hibernian
1968–69 season
- Manager: Bob Shankly
- Scottish First Division: 12th
- Scottish Cup: R1
- Scottish League Cup: F
- Inter-Cities Fairs Cup: R3
- Highest home attendance: 58,141 (v Rangers, 25 January)
- Lowest home attendance: 4240 (v St Johnstone, 1 May)
- Average home league attendance: 11,205 (down 755)

During the 1968–69 season Hibernian, a football club based in Edinburgh, came twelfth out of 18 clubs in the Scottish First Division.

== Scottish First Division ==
Match Day	Date	Opponent	H/A	Score	Hibernian Scorer(s)	Attendance
1	7 September	Heart of Midlothian	H	1–3	Stanton	24,110
2	14 September	Raith Rovers	A	0–2		5,010
3	21 September	Falkirk	H	3–2	Cormack (2), Davis (pen.)	6,595
4	28 September	Partick Thistle	A	1–2	Stein	4,776
5	5 October	Airdrieonians	H	5-1	Davis (pen.), Scott, Stein (2), Cormack	6,318
6	12 October	Clyde	A	1-1	Cormack	3,577
7	19 October	Kilmarnock	H	1–0	Cormack	8,653
8	26 October	Dundee United	H	1–1	Cormack	8,422
9	2 November	St Mirren	A	0–3		8,250
10	9 November	Rangers	A	1–6	McBride	49,079
11	16 November	Morton	H	5–0	McBride (4), Quinn	7,771
12	23 November	Arbroath	A	4–3	Cormack, McBride (2), O'Rourke	2,296
13	30 November	Celtic	H	2–5	McBride, Davis (pen.)	34,888
14	7 December	Aberdeen	A	6–2	Davis (pen.), Scott, McBride, Cormack (3)	11,102
14	14 December	Dundee	A	0–0		7,137
15	21 December	Dunfermline Athletic	H	3–1	O'Rourke, McBride, Stevenson	12,577
17	1 January	Heart of Midlothian	A	0–0		30,011
18	2 January	Raith Rovers	H	3–0	McBride (2), Cormack	11,336
19	4 January	Falkirk	A	1–0	McBride	7,172
20	11 January	Partick Thistle	H	1–2	Quinn	8,928
21	18 January	Airdireonans	A	1–3	McGraw	2,968
22	1 February	Clyde	H	2–1	Cormack, McBride	5,931
23	19 February	Kilmarnock	A	1–2	McBride	5,673
24	1 March	St Mirren	H	3–0	Davis (pen.), O'Rourke, McBride	6,146
25	5 March	Rangers	H	1–2	O'Rourke	29,221
26	8 March	Morton	A	3–4	Marinello, McBride, Hunter	4,631
27	15 March	Arbroath	H	1–2	Cropley	5,045
28	24 March	Celtic	A	1–1	McBride	29,001
29	29 March	Aberdeen	H	1–1	Davis (pen.)	6,321
30	31 March	Dundee United	A	0–3		5,358
31	8 April	Dundee	H	1–3	Cormack	1,991
32	19 April	St Johnstone	A	1–2	Stevenson	5,182
33	28 April	Dunfermline Athletic	A	1–1	O'Rourke	4,348
34	1 May	St Johnstone	H	4–0	O'Rourke, McBride, Cormack (2)	4,240

=== Final League table ===
P	Team	Pld	W	D	L	GF	GA	GD	Pts
11	St Mirren	34	11	10	13	40	54	–14	32
12	Hibernian	34	12	7	15	60	59	1	31
13	Clyde	34	9	13	12	35	50	–15	31

=== Scottish League Cup ===
==== Group stage ====
Round	Date	Opponent	H/A	Score	Hibernian Scorer(s)	Attendance
G1	10 August	St Johnstone	H	0–1		9,744
G1	14 August	Raith Rovers	A	1–0	O'Rourke	6,054
G1	17 August	Falkirk	H	2–0	Stein, O'Rourke	9,930
G1	24 August	St Johnstone	A	2–2	Stein (2)	4,640
G1	28 August	Raith Rovers	H	3–0	Marinello (2), Stanton	7,929
G1	31 August	Falkirk	A	2–0	O.G., Cormack	6,605

==== Group 1 final table ====
P	Team	Pld	W	D	L	GF	GA	GD	Pts
1	Hibernian	6	4	1	1	10	3	7	9
2	Raith Rovers	6	2	2	2	7	8	–1	6
3	St Johnstone	6	1	3	2	8	9	–1	5
4	Falkirk	6	1	2	3	8	13	–5	4

==== Knockout stage ====
Round	Date	Opponent	H/A	Score	Hibernian Scorer(s)	Attendance
QF L1	11 September	East Fife	A	4–1	Davis (pen.), Marinello, Stein, Stevenson	6,728
QF L2	25 September	East Fife	H	2–1	Stein, Stevenson	4,874
SF	9 October	Dundee	N	2–1	Stein, McGraw	19,752
F	5 April	Celtic	N	2–6	O'Rourke, Stevenson	74,253

=== Scottish Cup ===
Round	Date	Opponent	H/A	Score	Hibernian Scorer(s)	Attendance
R1	25 January	Rangers	H	0–1		58,141

=== Inter-Cities Fairs Cup ===
Round	Date	Opponent	H/A	Score	Hibernian Scorer(s)	Attendance
R1 L1	18 September	(Socialist Federal Republic of Yugoslavia) Olimpija Ljubljana	A	3–0	Stevenson, Stein, O.G.	3,000
R1 L2	2 October	(Socialist Federal Republic of Yugoslavia) Olimpija Ljubljana	H	2–1	Davis (2 pens.)	10,445
R2 L1	13 November	(East Germany) Lokomotive Leipzig	H	3–1	McBride (3)	11,000
R2 L2	20 November	(East Germany) Lokomotive Leipzig	A	1–0	Grant	10,000
R3 L1	18 December	(West Germany) SV Hamburg	A	0–1		7,000
R3 L2	15 January	(West Germany) SV Hamburg	H	2-1	McBride (2)	27,399

== See also ==
- List of Hibernian F.C. seasons
