= 1966–67 Hibernian F.C. season =

Hibernian
1966–67 season
- Manager: Bob Shankly
- Scottish First Division: 5th
- Scottish Cup: QF
- Scottish League Cup: GS
- Highest home attendance: 43,526 (v Celtic, 8 October)
- Lowest home attendance: 3459 (v St Mirren, 8 April)
- Average home league attendance: 12,796 (up 841)

During the 1966–67 season Hibernian, a football club based in Edinburgh, came fifth out of 18 clubs in the Scottish First Division.

== Scottish First Division ==
Match Day	Date	Opponent	H/A	Score	Hibernian Scorer(s)	Attendance
1	10 September	Heart of Midlothian	H	3–1	Davis (pen.), McGraw, Scott	21,395
2	17 September	Dunfermline Athletic	A	6–5	Cormack, Scott (2), Stevenson, McGraw (2)	9,312
3	24 September	Partick Thistle	H	7–0	Cormack (2), Stein (2), Scott (2), Stevenson	9,722
4	1 October	Motherwell	A	2–1	Stein, McGraw	5,609
5	8 October	Celtic	H	3–5	Davis (pen.), Cormack, McGraw	43,526
6	15 October	Kilmarnock	A	1–2	Stein	8,341
7	22 October	Dundee United	H	2–2	Davis (pen.), Cormack	10,436
8	29 October	Aberdeen	A	1–2	Cormack	9,435
9	5 November	Falkirk	H	3–1	Stein(2), Davis	7,034
10	12 November	Clyde	A	1–5	O'Rourke	2,626
11	19 November	Dundee	A	1–2	Davis (pen.)	8,073
12	26 November	Rangers	H	1–2	O'Rourke	25,798
13	3 December	Stirling Albion	H	6–0	Davis, McNamee, Cormack, O'Rourke, Stevenson (2)	5,479
14	10 December	St Mirren	A	3–1	Davis (pen.), Cormack (2)	2,994
14	17 December	Ayr United	A	2–0	O'Rourke, Stevenson	6,553
15	24 December	St Johnstone	H	2–5	Stevenson, O'Rourke	5,688
17	31 December	Airdireonians	A	1–0	Davis (pen.)	4,000
18	2 January	Heart of Midlothian	A	0–0		30,086
19	3 January	Dunfermline Athletic	H	2–0	Cormack, McGraw	15,896
20	7 January	Partick Thistle	A	4–1	McGraw, Davis (pen.), Stevenson (2)	5,324
21	14 January	Motherwell	H	2–1	Davis (pen.), Cormack	11,465
22	21 January	Celtic	A	0–2		36,727
23	4 February	Kilmarnock	H	3–1	Scott (2, 1 pen.), Stein	10,862
24	11 February	Dundee United	A	3–1	O'Rourke, Scott (pen.), Cormack	9,200
25	25 February	Aberdeen	H	1–0	Cormack	18,532
26	4 March	Falkirk	A	2–0	O'Rourke, Stein	5,953
27	18 March	Dundee	H	2–1	Stevenson, Stanton	10,478
28	25 March	Rangers	A	0–1		33,095
29	28 March	Clyde	H	1–1	McGraw	8,401
30	1 April	Stirling Albion	A	0–1		2,919
31	8 April	St Mirren	H	1–1	Davis (pen.)	3,459
32	15 April	Ayr United	H	4–1	McGraw, Davis (2 pens.), Stein	4,029
33	22 April	St Johnstone	A	2–1	McGraw (2)	3,094
34	29 April	Airdrieonians	H	0–2		5,333

=== Final League table ===
P	Team	Pld	W	D	L	GF	GA	GD	Pts
4	Aberdeen	34	17	8	9	72	38	34	42
5	Hibernian	34	19	4	11	72	49	23	42
6	Dundee	34	16	9	9	74	51	23	41

=== Scottish League Cup ===
==== Group stage ====
Round	Date	Opponent	H/A	Score	Hibernian Scorer(s)	Attendance
G2	13 August	Rangers	A	0–1		41,154
G2	17 August	Kilmarnock	H	2–1	McGraw (2)	11,159
G2	20 August	Stirling Albion	A	4–2	Cormack (2), Scott (2)	3,505
G2	27 August	Rangers	H	3–2	McNamee, McGraw, Scott	32,913
G2	31 August	Kilmarnock	A	0–3		12,285
G2	3 September	Stirling Albion	H	3–0	McNamee (2), Scott	9,584

==== Group 2 final table ====
P	Team	Pld	W	D	L	GF	GA	GD	Pts
1	Rangers	6	3	2	1	13	4	8	8
2	Hibernian	6	4	0	2	12	9	3	8
3	Kilmarnock	6	2	2	2	6	3	3	6
4	Stirling Albion	6	0	2	4	3	18	–15	2

=== Scottish Cup ===
Round	Date	Opponent	H/A	Score	Hibernian Scorer(s)	Attendance
R1	28 January	Brechin City	H	2–0	Cormack, O'Rourke	8,184
R2	18 February	Berwick Rangers	H	1–0	Scott	29,911
QF	11 March	Aberdeen	H	1–1	Stevenson	37,225
QF R	22 March	Aberdeen	A	0–3		44,000

== See also ==
- List of Hibernian F.C. seasons
