= 1967–68 Heart of Midlothian F.C. season =

Heart of Midlothian
1967–68 season
- Manager: John Harvey
- Stadium: Tynecastle Park
- Scottish First Division: 12th
- Scottish Cup: Runners-up
- League Cup: Group Stage

During the 1967–68 season Hearts competed in the Scottish First Division, the Scottish Cup, the Scottish League Cup and the East of Scotland Shield.

== Fixtures ==
=== Friendlies ===
5 August 1967 Friendly	Hearts	2–0	Preston North End	Tynecastle Park
	Goal

8 August 1967 Friendly	Hull City	4–0	Hearts	The Hawthorns
	Goal

21 May 1968 Overseas Tour	Linfield	1–5	Hearts	Windsor Park
	Goal

24 May 1968 Overseas Tour	Coleraine	0–0	Hearts	The Showgrouds
	Goal

26 May 1968 Overseas Tour	Dundalk	0–2	Hearts	Oriel Park
	Goal

=== East of Scotland Shield ===
23 October 1967 Final	Hibernian	2–1	Hearts	Easter Road

=== League Cup ===
12 August 1967 League Cup Group	Hearts	1–2	St Johnstone	Tynecastle Park
				Attendance: 6,692

16 August 1967 League Cup Group	Stirling Albion	0–1	Hearts	Annfield Stadium
				Attendance: 3,680

19 August 1967 League Cup Group	Falkirk	0–2	Hearts	Brockville Park
				Attendance: 5,182

26 August 1967 League Cup Group	St Johnstone	3–2	Hearts	Muirton Park
				Attendance: 6,250

30 August 1967 League Cup Group	Hearts	4–1	Stirling Albion	Tynecastle Park
				Attendance: 3,073

2 September 1967 League Cup Group	Hearts	3–1	Falkirk	Tynecastle Park
				Attendance: 4,745

=== Scottish Cup ===
27 January 1968 Scottish Cup R1	Hearts	4–1	Brechin City	Tynecastle Park
				Attendance: 8,847

17 February 1968 Scottish Cup R2	Dundee United	5–6	Hearts	Tannadice Park
				Attendance: 9,021

9 March 1968 Scottish Cup R3	Rangers	1–1	Hearts	Ibrox Park
				Attendance: 57,521

13 March 1968 Scottish Cup R3 Replay	Hearts	1–0	Rangers	Tynecastle Park
				Attendance: 44,094

30 March 1968 Scottish Cup SF	Morton	1–1	Hearts	Hampden Park
				Attendance: 22,556

3 April 1968 Scottish Cup SF Replay	Morton	1–2	Hearts	Hampden Park
				Attendance: 11,565

27 April 1968 Scottish Cup Final	Dunfermline Athletic	3–1	Hearts	Hampden Park
				Attendance: 56,366

=== Scottish First Division ===
9 September 1967 Scottish First Division	Hearts	1–4	Hibernian	Tynecastle Park
				Attendance: 20,773

16 September 1967 Scottish First Division	Dunfermline Athletic	1–3	Hearts	East End Park
				Attendance: 6,746

23 September 1967 Scottish First Division	Hearts	1–0	Dundee	Tynecastle Park
				Attendance: 9,404

30 September 1967 Scottish First Division	Rangers	1–1	Hearts	Ibrox Park
				Attendance: 40,587

7 October 1967 Scottish First Division	Hearts	2–3	Clyde	Tynecastle Park
				Attendance: 8,100

14 October 1967 Scottish First Division	Raith Rovers	2–4	Hearts	Stark's Park
				Attendance: 6,362

21 October 1967 Scottish First Division	Hearts	2–1	Aberdeen	Tynecastle Park
				Attendance: 9,358

28 October 1967 Scottish First Division	Motherwell	2–5	Hearts	Fir Park
				Attendance: 4,749

4 November 1967 Scottish First Division	Hearts	1–0	Falkirk	Tynecastle Park
				Attendance: 7,999

11 November 1967 Scottish First Division	Hearts	1–0	Dundee United	Tynecastle Park
				Attendance: 7,478

18 November 1967 Scottish First Division	Partick Thistle	3–3	Hearts	Firhill Park
				Attendance: 4,276

25 November 1967 Scottish First Division	Hearts	1–1	St Johnstone	Tynecastle Park
				Attendance: 9,640

2 December 1967 Scottish First Division	Kilmarnock	3–2	Hearts	Cappielow Park
				Attendance: 5,558

9 December 1967 Scottish First Division	Celtic	3–1	Hearts	Celtic Park
				Attendance: 32,364

16 December 1967 Scottish First Division	Hearts	3–1	Airdrieonians	Tynecastle Park
				Attendance: 6,426

23 December 1967 Scottish First Division	Sirling Albion	1–4	Hearts	Annfield Stadium
				Attendance: 2,826

30 December 1967 Scottish First Division	Hearts	3–0	Morton	Tynecastle Park
				Attendance: 8,177

1 January 1968 Scottish First Division	Hibs	1–0	Hearts	Easter Road
				Attendance: 32,360

2 January 1968 Scottish First Division	Hearts	1–2	Dunfermline Athletic	Tynecastle Park
				Attendance: 14,293

13 January 1968 Scottish First Division	Hearts	2–3	Rangers	Tynecastle Park
				Attendance: 34,065

20 January 1968 Scottish First Division	Clyde	6–3	Hearts	Shawfield Stadium
				Attendance: 3,603

10 February 1968 Scottish First Division	Aberdeen	2–0	Hearts	Pittodrie Stadium
				Attendance: 11,330

28 February 1968 Scottish First Division	Hearts	3–2	Motherwell	Tynecastle Park
				Attendance: 8,178

2 March 1968 Scottish First Division	Falkirk	4–1	Hearts	Brockville Park
				Attendance: 5,709

4 March 1968 Scottish First Division	Hearts	0–2	Raith Rovers	Tynecastle Park
				Attendance: 6,200

16 March 1968 Scottish First Division	Hearts	0–1	Partick Thistle	Tynecastle Park
				Attendance: 5,290

20 March 1968 Scottish First Division	Dundee United	2–1	Hearts	Tannadice Park
				Attendance: 3,801

23 March 1968 Scottish First Division	St Johnstone	3–2	Hearts	Muirton Park
				Attendance: 3,332

6 April 1968 Scottish First Division	Hearts	0–2	Celtic	Tynecastle Park
				Attendance: 26,124

10 April 1968 Scottish First Division	Hearts	1–0	Kilmarnock	Tynecastle Park
				Attendance: 4,650

13 April 1968 Scottish First Division	Airdrieonians	2–2	Hearts	Broomfield Park
				Attendance: 3,133

17 April 1968 Scottish First Division	Dundee	1–0	Hearts	Dens Park
				Attendance: 4,757

20 April 1968 Scottish First Division	Hearts	2–1	Stirling Albion	Tynecastle Park
				Attendance: 4,728

29 April 1968 Scottish First Division	Morton	1–0	Hearts	Cappielow Park
				Attendance: 4,306

== See also ==
- List of Heart of Midlothian F.C. seasons
