= 1967–68 Celtic F.C. season =

Celtic
1967–68 season
- Manager: Jock Stein
- Stadium: Celtic Park
- Scottish Division One: 1st
- Scottish Cup: First round
- Scottish League Cup: Winners
- European Cup: First round
- Intercontinental Cup: Finalists

During the 1967–68 Scottish football season, Celtic competed in the Scottish Division One.

== Competitions ==
=== Scottish Division One ===
==== League table ====
Pos	Team	Pld	W	D	L	GF	GA	GD	Pts	Qualification or relegation
1	Celtic	34	30	3	1	106	24	+82	63	1968-69 European Cup
2	Rangers	34	28	5	1	93	34	+59	61	
3	Hibernian	34	20	5	9	67	49	+18	45	
4	Dunfermline Athletic	34	17	5	12	64	41	+23	39	
5	Aberdeen	34	16	5	13	63	48	+15	37	

Source: "1967-1968 First Division - SPFL Archive". SPFL.

==== Matches ====
9 September 1967 Division One	Celtic	3–0	Clyde	Glasgow
15:00				Stadium: Celtic Park; Attendance: 33,434

16 September 1967 Division One	Rangers	1–0	Celtic	Glasgow
15:00				Stadium: Ibrox Park; Attendance: 87,595

23 September 1967 Division One	Celtic	1–1	St Johnstone	Glasgow
15:00				Stadium: Celtic Park; Attendance: 27,984

30 September 1967 Division One	Stirling Albion	0–4	Celtic	Stirling
15:00 BST				Stadium: Annfield; Attendance: 13,723

7 October 1967 Division One	Celtic	4–0	Hibernian	Glasgow
15:00 BST				Stadium: Celtic Park; Attendance: 36,104

14 October 1967 Division One	Partick Thistle	1–5	Celtic	Glasgow
15:00 BST				Stadium: Firhill Park; Attendance: 27,347

24 October 1967 Division One	Celtic	4– 2	Motherwell	Glasgow
15:00 BST				Stadium: Celtic Park; Attendance: 20,532

11 November 1967 Division One	Airdrieonians	0–2	Celtic	Airdrie
15:00 BST				Stadium: Broomfield Park; Attendance: 17,158

15 November 1967 Division One	Celtic	3–0	Kilmarnock	Glasgow
19:30 BST				Stadium: Celtic Park; Attendance: 26,727

18 November 1967 Division One	Celtic	3–0	Falkirk	Glasgow
15:00 GMT				Stadium: Celtic Park; Attendance: 32,048

25 November 1967 Division One	Raith Rovers	0–2	Celtic	Kirkcaldy
15:00 GMT				Stadium: Stark's Park; Attendance: 15,936

2 December 1967 Division One	Celtic	1–1	Dundee United	Glasgow
15:00 GMT				Stadium: Celtic Park; Attendance: 33,506

9 December 1967 Division One	Celtic	3–1	Hearts	Glasgow
15:00 GMT				Stadium: Celtic Park; Attendance: 32,364

16 December 1967 Division One	Dundee	4–5	Celtic	Dundee
15:00 GMT				Stadium: Dens Park; Attendance: 17,801

23 December 1967 Division One	Morton	0–4	Celtic	Greenock
15:00 GMT				Stadium: Cappielow Park; Attendance: 14,847

30 December 1967 Division One	Celtic	3–2	Dunfermline Athletic	Glasgow
15:00 GMT				Stadium: Celtic Park; Attendance: 32,646

1 January 1968 Division One	Clyde	2–3	Celtic	Glasgow
15:00 GMT				Stadium: Shawfield Stadium; Attendance: 12,977

2 January 1968 Division One	Celtic	2–2	Rangers	Glasgow
15:00 GMT				Stadium: Celtic Park; Attendance: 73,480

20 January 1968 Division One	Hibernian	0–2	Celtic	Edinburgh
15:00 GMT				Stadium: Easter Road; Attendance: 38,077

3 February 1968 Division One	Celtic	4–1	Partick Thistle	Glasgow
15:00 GMT				Stadium: Celtic Park; Attendance: 24,248

10 February 1968 Division One	Motherwell	0–1	Celtic	Motherwell
15:00 GMT				Stadium: Fir Park; Attendance: 17,002

14 February 1968 Division One	Celtic	2–0	Stirling Albion	Glasgow
19:30 GMT				Stadium: Celtic Park; Attendance: 14,157

2 March 1968 Division One	Kilmarnock	0–6	Celtic	Kilmarnock
15:00 GMT				Stadium: Rugby Park; Attendance: 18,591

6 March 1968 Division One	Celtic	4–1	Aberdeen	Glasgow
19:30 GMT				Stadium: Celtic Park; Attendance: 25,862

13 March 1968 Division One	Celtic	4–0	Airdireonians	Glasgow
19:00 GMT				Stadium: Celtic Park; Attendance: 15,392

16 March 1968 Division One	Falkirk	0–3	Celtic	Falkirk
15:00 GMT				Stadium: Brockville Park; Attendance: 13,010

23 March 1968 Division One	Celtic	5–0	Raith Rovers	Glasgow
15:00 GMT				Stadium: Celtic Park; Attendance: 19,477

25 March 1968 Division One	St Johnstone	1–6	Celtic	Perth
19:30 GMT				Stadium: Muirton Park; Attendance: 9,522

30 March 1968 Division One	Dundee United	0–5	Celtic	Dundee
19:30 GMT				Stadium: Tannadice Park; Attendance: 11,315

6 April 1968 Division One	Hearts	0–2	Celtic	Edinburgh
15:00 BST				Stadium: Tynecastle Park; Attendance: 26,124

10 April 1968 Division One	Aberdeen	0–1	Celtic	Aberdeen
19:30 BST				Stadium: Pittodrie Stadium; Attendance: 21,394

13 April 1968 Division One	Celtic	5–2	Dundee	Glasgow
15:00 BST				Stadium: Celtic Park; Attendance: 37,474

20 April 1968 Division One	Celtic	2–1	Morton	Glasgow
15:00 BST				Stadium: Celtic Park; Attendance: 28,267

30 April 1968 Division One	Dunfermline Athletic	1–2	Celtic	Dunfermline
19:30 BST				Stadium: East End Park; Attendance: 27,816

=== Scottish Cup ===
27 January 1968 First round	Celtic	0–2	Dunfermline Athletic	Glasgow
15:00 GMT				Stadium: Celtic Park; Attendance: 47,000

=== Scottish League Cup ===
12 August 1967 Group 8	Celtic	1–0	Dundee United	Glasgow
15:30 GMT				Stadium: Celtic Park; Attendance: 51,101

16 August 1967 Group 8	Rangers	1–1	Celtic	Glasgow
19:30 GMT				Stadium: Ibrox Park; Attendance: 94,168

19 August 1967 Group 8	Celtic	3–1	Aberdeen	Glasgow
15:00 GMT				Stadium: Celtic Park; Attendance: 47,207

26 August 1967 Group 8	Dundee United	0–1	Celtic	Dundee
19:30 GMT				Stadium: Tannadice Park; Attendance: 25,697

30 August 1967 Group 8	Celtic	3–1	Rangers	Glasgow
15:00 GMT				Stadium: Celtic Park; Attendance: 74,991

2 September 1967 Group 8	Aberdeen	1–5	Celtic	Aberdeen
19:30 GMT				Stadium: Pittodrie Stadium; Attendance: 22,216

13 September 1967 Quarter-final 1st leg	Celtic	6–2	Ayr United	Glasgow
19:30 GMT				Stadium: Celtic Park; Attendance: 24,144

27 September 1967 Quarter-final 2nd leg	Ayr United	0–2 (2–8 agg.)	Celtic	Ayr
19:45 GMT				Stadium: Somerset Park; Attendance: 7,315

11 October 1967 Semi-final	Celtic	7–1	Morton	Glasgow
19:30 GMT				Stadium: Hampden Park; Attendance: 45,622

28 October 1967 Final	Celtic	5–3	Dundee	Glasgow
15:00 GMT				Stadium: Hampden Park; Attendance: 66,660

=== European Cup ===
20 September 1967 1st round 1st leg	Celtic (Scotland)	1–2	(Soviet Union) Dinamo Kiev	Glasgow
20:00 GMT				Stadium: Celtic Park; Attendance: 52,223

4 October 1967 1st round 2nd leg	Dinamo Kiev (Soviet Union)	1–1 (3–2 agg.)	(Scotland) Celtic	Kiev
20:00 GMT				Stadium: Dynamo Stadium; Attendance: 68,352

=== Intercontinental Cup ===
18 October 1967 1st leg	Celtic (Scotland)	1–0	(Argentina) Racing Club	Glasgow
20:00 GMT				Stadium: Hampden Park; Attendance: 83,437

1 November 1967 2nd leg	Racing Club (Argentina)	2–1 (2–2 agg.)	(Scotland) Celtic	Buenos Aires
19:30 GMT				Stadium: El Cilindro; Attendance: 70,000

4 November 1967 Play-Off	Racing Club (Argentina)	1–0	(Scotland) Celtic	Montevideo
19:00 GMT				Stadium: Estadio Centenario; Attendance: 65,172

=== Glasgow Cup ===
22 August 1967 1st round	Celtic	5–0	Partick Thistle	Glasgow
19:30 BST				Stadium: Celtic Park; Attendance: 25,000

11 March 1968 Semi-final	Celtic	w/o (Note: Rangers declined to play the Glasgow Cup fixture on 11 March citing fixture congestion, after a Scottish Cup tie they were involved in went to a second replay, was delayed due to bad weather and eventually took place on 4 March, occupying the original Glasgow Cup date. On 9 March, the Glasgow FA declined their request for a further delay and awarded the tie to Celtic.)	Rangers

17 April 1968 Final	Celtic	8–0	Clyde	Glasgow
19:30 BST				Stadium: Hampden Park; Attendance: 35,000

== See also ==
- Nine in a row
