= Kenneth Davidson =

Kenneth or Kenny Davidson may refer to:

- Kenneth Davidson (mathematician), professor of pure mathematics at the University of Waterloo
- Walter Davidson (Canadian politician) (Kenneth Walter Davidson, born 1937), former political figure in British Columbia, Canada
- Kenneth Davidson (cricketer) (1905–1954), English cricketer
- Kenneth S. M. Davidson, mechanical engineering professor
- Kenny Davidson (American football) (born 1967), former American football defensive end
- Kenny Davidson (Scottish footballer) (born 1952)
- W. K. Davidson, known as Kenny, American restaurateur and Illinois politician
