= 1962–63 Hibernian F.C. season =

Hibernian
1962–63 season
- Manager: Walter Galbraith
- Scottish First Division: 16th
- Scottish Cup: R3
- Scottish League Cup: GS
- Inter-Cities Fairs Cup: QF
- Highest home attendance: 35,698 (v Rangers, 11 August)
- Lowest home attendance: 3867 (v Kilmarnock, 17 November)
- Average home league attendance: 9,096 (down 667)

During the 1962–63 season Hibernian, a football club based in Edinburgh, came sixteenth out of 18 clubs in the Scottish First Division.

== Scottish First Division ==
Match Day	Date	Opponent	H/A	Score	Hibernian Scorer(s)	Attendance
1	22 August	Clyde	A	1–3		4,034
2	8 September	Heart of Midlothian	H	0–4		28,847
3	15 September	Motherwell	A	2–2		7,921
4	22 September	Rangers	H	1–5		26,886
5	29 September	Dundee United	A	0–5		8,333
6	6 October	Raith Rovers	H	1–0		6,311
7	13 October	Dundee	H	2–2		10,739
8	20 October	St Mirren	A	2–2		9,671
9	27 October	Queen of the South	H	3–0		4,531
10	3 November	Third Lanark	A	4–1		9,112
11	10 November	Aberdeen	A	0–3		10,733
12	17 November	Kilmarnock	H	0–2		3,867
13	24 November	Airdrieonians	A	1–2		2,344
14	1 December	Celtic	H	1–1		15,748
14	8 December	Partick Thistle	H	0–2		8,040
15	15 December	Dunfermline Athletic	A	2–3		4,917
17	29 December	Clyde	H	1–2		4,346
18	9 March	Third Lanark	H	1–1		5,404
19	16 March	Aberdeen	H	2–3		5,587
19	23 March	Kilmarnock	A	0–2		7,692
20	27 March	Falkirk	A	1–3		3,319
21	30 March	Airdireonians	H	0–2		4,015
23	6 April	Celtic	A	0–2		13,608
24	8 April	Dundee	A	3–1		10,535
25	10 April	Rangers	A	1–3		23,698
26	13 April	Partick Thistle	A	2–2		4,806
27	17 April	Motherwell	H	1–0		5,236
28	20 April	Dunfermline Athletic	H	1–1		7,485
29	24 April	Dundee United	H	1–1		4,801
30	27 April	Falkirk	H	0–3		5,548
31	4 May	Heart of Midlothian	A	3–3		15,538
32	11 May	St Mirren	H	2–1		7,233
33	15 May	Queen of the South	A	4–0		4,206
34	18 May	Raith Rovers	A	4–0		2,858

=== Final League table ===
P	Team	Pld	W	D	L	GF	GA	GD	Pts
15	Queen of the South	34	10	6	18	36	75	–39	25
16	Hibernian	34	8	9	17	47	67	–20	25
17	Clyde	34	9	5	20	49	83	–34	23

=== Scottish League Cup ===
==== Group stage ====
Round	Date	Opponent	H/A	Score	Hibernian Scorer(s)	Attendance
G4	11 August	Rangers	H	1–4		35,698
G4	15 August	St Mirren	A	3–3		4,748
G4	18 August	Third Lanark	H	3–2		10,883
G4	25 August	Rangers	A	0–0		43,833
G4	29 August	St Mirren	H	2–0		10,245
G4	1 September	Third Lanark	A	4–1		3,935

==== Group 4 final table ====
P	Team	Pld	W	D	L	GF	GA	GD	Pts
1	Rangers	6	4	1	1	19	7	8	9
2	Hibernian	6	3	2	1	13	10	3	8
3	St Mirren	6	2	2	2	8	12	–4	6
4	Third Lanark	6	0	1	5	9	20	–11	1

=== Scottish Cup ===
Round	Date	Opponent	H/A	Score	Hibernian Scorer(s)	Attendance
R2	26 January	Brechin City	A	2–0		2,380
R3	18 March	Dundee	A	0–1		16,000

=== Inter-Cities Fairs Cup ===
Round	Date	Opponent	H/A	Score	Hibernian Scorer(s)	Attendance
R1 L1	3 October	(Denmark) Staevnet	H	4–0		4,000
R1 L2	23 October	(Denmark) Staevnet	A	3–2		4,500
R2 L1	27 November	(Netherlands) Utrecht XI	A	1–0		12,000
R2 L2	12 December	(Netherlands) Utrecht XI	H	2–1		5,000
QF L1	13 March	(Spain) Valencia CF	A	0–5		13,000
QF L2	3 April	(Spain) Valencia CF	H	2–1		4,000

== See also ==
- List of Hibernian F.C. seasons
