= 1961–62 Hibernian F.C. season =

Hibernian
1961–62 season
- Manager: Hugh Shaw (to November); Walter Galbraith (from November)
- Scottish First Division: 8th
- Scottish Cup: R1
- Scottish League Cup: GS
- Inter-Cities Fairs Cup: R2
- Highest home attendance: 32,237 (v Rangers, 6 January)
- Lowest home attendance: 1508 (v St Mirren, 4 April)
- Average home league attendance: 9,763 (down 5708)

During the 1961–62 season Hibernian, a football club based in Edinburgh, came eighth out of 18 clubs in the Scottish First Division.

== Scottish First Division ==
Match Day	Date	Opponent	H/A	Score	Hibernian Scorer(s)	Attendance
1	23 August	Rangers	A	0–3		41,727
2	9 September	Raith Rovers	H	3–2		10,317
3	16 September	Heart of Midlothian	A	2–4		23,022
4	23 September	Kilmarnock	H	3–2		26,886
5	30 September	Dundee United	A	0–4		7,785
6	7 October	Falkirk	H	2–2		9,899
7	14 October	Airdireonians	H	2–2		8,397
8	21 October	Partick Thistle	A	1–4		9,070
9	28 October	Third Lanark	H	1–3		8,314
10	4 November	Aberdeen	H	1–1		6,753
11	11 November	Motherwell	A	1–5		5,470
12	18 November	St Johnstone	A	2–0		7,645
13	25 November	Dundee	H	1–3		14,764
14	2 December	St Mirren	A	3–2		7,787
14	16 December	Celtic	A	3–4		26,752
15	23 December	Dunfermline Athletic	A	1–2		11,259
17	30 December	Stirling Albion	A	1–0		3,161
18	2 January	Raith Rovers	A	2–0		5,025
19	6 January	Rangers	H	0–0		32,237
19	13 January	Kilmarnock	A	2–4		8,599
20	17 January	Heart of Midlothian	H	1–4		15,277
21	20 January	Dundee United	H	3–2		6,829
23	3 February	Falkirk	A	4–1		3,983
24	10 February	Airdrieonians	A	2–4		2,946
25	12 February	Partick Thistle	H	0–3		3,249
26	24 February	Third Lanark	A	2–1		4,802
27	3 March	Aberdeen	A	2–1		6,588
28	14 March	Motherwell	H	2–1		6,324
29	17 March	St Johnstone	H	3–2		4,036
30	19 March	Dunfermline Athletic	A	0–4		6,659
31	24 March	Dundee	A	0–1		10,710
32	4 April	St Mirren	H	2–1		1,508
33	7 April	Celtic	H	1–1		10,683
34	28 April	Stirling Albion	H	3–1		2,942

=== Final League table ===
P	Team	Pld	W	D	L	GF	GA	GD	Pts
7	Partick Thistle	34	16	3	15	60	55	5	33
8	Hibernian	34	14	5	15	58	72	–14	33
9	Motherwell	34	13	6	15	65	62	3	32

=== Scottish League Cup ===
==== Group stage ====
Round	Date	Opponent	H/A	Score	Hibernian Scorer(s)	Attendance
G1	12 August	St Johnstone	A	1–1		9,832
G1	16 August	Partick Thistle	H	2–1		11,796
G1	19 August	Celtic	H	2–2		23,925
G1	26 August	St Johnstone	H	4–1		12,191
G1	30 August	Partick Thistle	A	1–2		10,245
G1	2 September	Celtic	A	1–2		29,972

==== Group 1 final table ====
P	Team	Pld	W	D	L	GF	GA	GD	Pts
1	St Johnstone	6	3	2	1	9	8	1	8
2	Celtic	6	3	1	2	10	10	0	7
3	Hibernian	6	2	2	2	11	9	2	6
4	Partick Thistle	6	1	1	4	10	13	–3	3

=== Scottish Cup ===
Round	Date	Opponent	H/A	Score	Hibernian Scorer(s)	Attendance
R1	13 December	Partick Thistle	A	2–2		9,668
R1 R	10 January	Partick Thistle	H	2–3		17,442

=== Inter-Cities Fairs Cup ===
Round	Date	Opponent	H/A	Score	Hibernian Scorer(s)	Attendance
R1 L1	4 September	(Portugal) Belanenses	H	3–3		20,000
R1 L2	27 September	(Portugal) Belanenses	A	3–1		25,000
R2 L1	1 November	(Socialist Federal Republic of Yugoslavia) Red Star Belgrade	A	0–4		25,000
R2 L2	15 November	(Socialist Federal Republic of Yugoslavia) Red Star Belgrade	H	0–1		9,500

== See also ==
- List of Hibernian F.C. seasons
