= Jimmy Stevenson (footballer, born 1946) =

Scottish footballer (1946–2021)

Personal information
- Full name: James Stevenson
- Date of birth: 4 August 1946
- Place of birth: Bellshill, Scotland
- Date of death: 11 March 2021 (aged 74)
- Position: Left half

Youth career
- Edina Hearts

Senior career*
Years	Team	Apps	(Gls)
1963–1967	Hibernian	13	(1)
1967–1968	Southend United	34	(0)
1968–1970	Brentwood Town		
1970–1972	Chelmsford City		
1971	→ Margate (loan)	7	(0)
1972–1974	Dover		

International career
- Scotland Schoolboys
- * Club domestic league appearances and goals

James Stevenson (4 August 1946 – 11 March 2021) was a Scottish footballer who played as a left midfielder.

== Career ==
Stevenson signed for Hibernian at the beginning of the 1963–64 season from Edina Hearts. On 21 March 1964, Stevenson made his debut for Hibs in a 1–0 win against St Mirren. Over the course of four years, Stevenson made 13 appearances for Hibernian, scoring once.

In 1967, Stevenson moved to England, signing for Southend United. Stevenson made 34 league appearances for Southend, signing for Brentwood Town in 1968. In 1970, Stevenson signed for Chelmsford City, following a merger between Brentwood and Chelmsford. Stevenson made 93 appearances for Chelmsford, scoring 23 times, helping the club to the 1971–72 Southern League title. In January 1971, Stevenson signed for Margate on loan, making seven appearances. In 1972, following his departure from Chelmsford, Stevenson signed for Dover, staying with the club until the 1973–74 season.
