= 1963–64 Hibernian F.C. season =

Hibernian
1963–64 season
- Manager: Walter Galbraith
- Scottish First Division: 10th
- Scottish Cup: SF
- Scottish League Cup: GS
- Summer Cup 1964: Winners
- Highest home attendance: 31,439 (v Heart of Midlothian, 1 January)
- Lowest home attendance: 4922 (v St Mirren, 21 March)
- Average home league attendance: 11,704 (up 2618)

During the 1963–64 season Hibernian, a football club based in Edinburgh, came tenth out of 18 clubs in the Scottish First Division.

== Scottish First Division ==
| Match Day | Date | Opponent | H/A | Score | Hibernian Scorer(s) | Attendance |
|---|---|---|---|---|---|---|
| 1 | 21 August | Third Lanark | H | 3–0 | | 9,646 |
| 2 | 7 September | Heart of Midlothian | A | 2–4 | | 29,173 |
| 3 | 14 September | Falkirk | H | 2–2 | | 9,762 |
| 4 | 21 September | Rangers | A | 0–5 | | 49,024 |
| 5 | 28 September | Kilmarnock | H | 0–2 | | 11,030 |
| 6 | 5 October | Motherwell | A | 3–4 | | 6,449 |
| 7 | 12 October | Dunfermline Athletic | A | 0–3 | | 9,549 |
| 8 | 19 October | Dundee | H | 0–4 | | 11,071 |
| 9 | 26 October | St Johnstone | H | 4–1 | | 9,674 |
| 10 | 2 November | Partick Thistle | A | 1–2 | | 9,112 |
| 11 | 9 November | Queen of the South | A | 3–2 | | 4,619 |
| 12 | 16 November | Celtic | H | 1–1 | | 22,306 |
| 13 | 23 November | St Mirren | A | 1–1 | | 5,976 |
| 14 | 30 November | Aberdeen | H | 2–0 | | 9,951 |
| 14 | 7 December | Airdrieonians | A | 5–3 | | 2,852 |
| 15 | 14 December | East Stirlingshire | A | 1–3 | | 3,374 |
| 17 | 21 December | Dundee United | H | 2–3 | | 7,498 |
| 18 | 28 December | Third Lanark | A | 0–1 | | 3,122 |
| 19 | 1 January | Heart of Midlothian | H | 1–1 | | 31,439 |
| 19 | 2 January | Falkirk | A | 4–1 | | 9,135 |
| 20 | 4 January | Rangers | H | 0–1 | | 17,463 |
| 21 | 18 January | Kilmarnock | A | 1–2 | | 9,554 |
| 23 | 1 February | Motherwell | H | 3–1 | | 9,916 |
| 24 | 8 February | Dunfermline Athletic | H | 0–0 | | 10,535 |
| 25 | 19 February | Dundee | A | 0–3 | | 10,591 |
| 26 | 22 February | St Johnstone | A | 4–0 | | 5,693 |
| 27 | 29 February | Partick Thistle | H | 2–1 | | 10,171 |
| 28 | 7 March | Queen of the South | H | 5–2 | | 8,632 |
| 29 | 14 March | Celtic | A | 0–5 | | 9,800 |
| 30 | 21 March | St Mirren | H | 1–0 | | 4,922 |
| 31 | 28 March | Aberdeen | A | 1–3 | | 6,269 |
| 32 | 4 April | Airdrieonians | H | 2–1 | | 7,094 |
| 33 | 18 April | East Stirlingshire | H | 5–2 | | 6,587 |
| 34 | 24 April | Dundee United | A | 1–1 | | 3,278 |

=== Final League table ===
| P | Team | Pld | W | D | L | GF | GA | GD | Pts |
|---|---|---|---|---|---|---|---|---|---|
| 9 | Aberdeen | 34 | 12 | 8 | 14 | 53 | 53 | 0 | 32 |
| 10 | Hibernian | 34 | 12 | 6 | 16 | 59 | 66 | –7 | 30 |
| 11 | Motherwell | 34 | 9 | 11 | 14 | 51 | 62 | –11 | 29 |

=== Scottish League Cup ===
==== Group stage ====
| Round | Date | Opponent | H/A | Score | Hibernian Scorer(s) | Attendance |
|---|---|---|---|---|---|---|
| G2 | 10 August | St Mirren | A | 1–1 | | 5,973 |
| G2 | 14 August | Dundee United | H | 3–2 | | 9,759 |
| G2 | 17 August | Aberdeen | H | 2–2 | | 9,907 |
| G2 | 24 August | St Mirren | H | 3–0 | | 9,646 |
| G2 | 28 August | Dundee United | A | 4–2 | | 11,250 |
| G2 | 31 August | Aberdeen | A | 2–0 | | 19,362 |

==== Group 2 final table ====
| P | Team | Pld | W | D | L | GF | GA | GD | Pts |
|---|---|---|---|---|---|---|---|---|---|
| 1 | Hibernian | 6 | 4 | 2 | 0 | 15 | 7 | 8 | 10 |
| 2 | Aberdeen | 6 | 2 | 3 | 1 | 10 | 7 | 3 | 7 |
| 3 | Dundee United | 6 | 2 | 1 | 3 | 11 | 14 | –3 | 5 |
| 4 | St Mirren | 6 | 0 | 2 | 4 | 7 | 15 | –8 | 2 |

==== Knockout stage ====
| Round | Date | Opponent | H/A | Score | Hibernian Scorer(s) | Attendance |
|---|---|---|---|---|---|---|
| QF L1 | 11 September | Dundee | A | 3–3 | | 23,225 |
| QF L2 | 18 September | Dundee | H | 2–0 | | 24,375 |
| SF | 7 October | Morton | N | 1–1 | | 46,894 |
| SF R | 14 October | Morton | N | 0–1 | | 36,092 |

=== Scottish Cup ===
| Round | Date | Opponent | H/A | Score | Hibernian Scorer(s) | Attendance |
|---|---|---|---|---|---|---|
| R1 | 11 January | Aberdeen | A | 2–5 | | 15,503 |

=== 1964 Summer Cup ===
| Round | Date | Opponent | H/A | Score | Hibernian Scorer(s) | Attendance |
|---|---|---|---|---|---|---|
| G4 | 2 May | Heart of Midlothian | A | 2–3 | | ????? |
| G4 | 6 May | Dunfermline Athletic | H | 1–1 | | ????? |
| G4 | 9 May | Falkirk | A | 2–4 | | ????? |
| G4 | 13 May | Heart of Midlothian | H | 1–0 | | ????? |
| G4 | 16 May | Dunfermline Athletic | A | 1–1 | | ????? |
| G4 | 19 May | Falkirk | H | 4–0 | | ????? |

==== Group 4 Final Table ====
| P | Team | Pld | W | D | L | GF | GA | GD | Pts |
|---|---|---|---|---|---|---|---|---|---|
| 1 | Heart of Midlothian | 6 | 3 | 1 | 2 | 10 | 7 | 3 | 7 |
| 2 | Hibernian | 6 | 2 | 2 | 2 | 11 | 9 | 2 | 6 |
| 3 | Dunfermline Athletic | 6 | 1 | 4 | 1 | 11 | 9 | 2 | 6 |
| 4 | Falkirk | 6 | 2 | 1 | 3 | 12 | 19 | –7 | 5 |

==== Knockout stage ====
After Hearts pulled out due to tour of USA, second-place Hibernian and third-place Dunfermline played each other for a place in the semi-final.

| Round | Date | Opponent | H/A | Score | Hibernian Scorer(s) | Attendance |
|---|---|---|---|---|---|---|
| Play off | 23 May | Dunfermline Athletic | H | 3–1 | | ????? |
| SF L1 | 27 May | Kilmarnock | A | 3–4 | | ???? |
| SF L2 | 30 May | Kilmarnock | H | 3–0 | | 18,000 |

Continued into August

== See also ==
- List of Hibernian F.C. seasons
