= Davie Hogg =

Scottish footballer (born 1946)

Personal information
- Full name: David Michael Hogg
- Date of birth: 23 August 1946 (age 80)
- Place of birth: Edinburgh, Scotland
- Position: Forward

Senior career*
Years	Team	Apps	(Gls)
1963–1968	Hibernian	11	(1)
1968–1970	Dundee United	41	(6)
1968–1970	Dumbarton	4	(0)
1970–1972	Berwick Rangers		
1971–1972	Hamilton Academical	6	(0)
1972–1973	Alloa Athletic	16	(0)
- * Club domestic league appearances and goals

David Michael Hogg (born 23 August 1946) is a Scottish former footballer, who played for Hibernian, Dundee United, Dumbarton, Berwick Rangers, Hamilton Academical and Alloa Athletic.
