= 1960–61 Hibernian F.C. season =

Hibernian
1960–61 season
- Manager: Hugh Shaw
- Scottish First Division: 8th
- Scottish Cup: R4
- Scottish League Cup: GS
- Inter-Cities Fairs Cup: SF
- Highest home attendance: 45,000 (v Barcelona, 22 February)
- Lowest home attendance: 7000 (v Airdrieonians, 27 February)
- Average home league attendance: 15,471 (down 1088)

During the 1960–61 season Hibernian, a football club based in Edinburgh, came eighth out of 18 clubs in the Scottish First Division.

== Scottish First Division ==
Match Day	Date	Opponent	H/A	Score	Hibernian Scorer(s)	Attendance
1	24 August	Dundee United	A	1–3		9,000
2	10 September	Heart of Midlothian	H	1–4		40,000
3	17 September	Kilmarnock	A	1–4		11,995
4	24 September	Raith Rovers	H	0–1		12,000
5	1 October	Partick Thistle	A	1–3		8,000
6	8 October	St Johnstone	A	0–2		10,400
7	15 October	Celtic	H	0–6		28,000
8	22 October	Airdrieonians	A	3–4		4,000
9	29 October	St Mirren	H	4–3		9,000
10	5 November	Dundee	A	1–0		13,000
11	12 November	Ayr United	H	3–1		10,000
12	19 November	Aberdeen	H	2–2		14,000
13	26 November	Motherwell	A	1–4		15,000
14	3 December	Dunfermline Athletic	H	2–1		9,000
14	10 December	Rangers	H	1–2		35,000
15	17 December	Clyde	A	3–3		7,000
17	24 December	Third Lanark	H	8–4		14,000
18	31 December	Dundee United	H	2–0		15,000
19	2 January	Heart of Midlothian	A	2–1		43,000
19	7 January	Kilmarnock	H	4–0		8,599
20	14 January	Raith Rovers	A	2–0		11,000
21	21 January	Partick Thistle	H	1–1		11,000
23	8 February	St Johnstone	H	3–1		8,000
24	18 February	Celtic	A	0–2		32,000
25	27 February	Airdireonians	H	3–3		7,000
26	4 March	St Mirren	A	1–2		15,000
27	18 March	Ayr United	A	1–0		5,000
28	20 March	Dundee	H	1–0		8,000
29	25 March	Aberdeen	A	4–1		6,000
30	1 April	Motherwell	H	2–1		15,000
31	8 April	Dunfermline Athletic	A	2–4		11,000
32	11 April	Rangers	A	0–1		45,000
33	22 April	Clyde	H	4–0		10,000
34	29 April	Third Lanark	A	1–6		8,000

=== Final League table ===
P	Team	Pld	W	D	L	GF	GA	GD	Pts
7	Heart of Midlothian	34	13	8	13	51	53	–2	34
8	Hibernian	34	15	4	15	66	69	–3	34
9	Dundee United	34	13	7	14	60	58	2	33

=== Scottish League Cup ===
==== Group stage ====
Round	Date	Opponent	H/A	Score	Hibernian Scorer(s)	Attendance
G3	13 August	Kilmarnock	A	2–4		15,451
G3	17 August	Dunfermline Athletic	H	3–0		18,000
G3	20 August	Airdireonians	H	6–1		15,000
G3	27 August	Kilmarnock	H	2–2		23,000
G3	31 August	Dunfermline Athletic	A	1–3		10,000
G3	3 September	Airdireonians	A	1–2		3,500

==== Group 3 final table ====
P	Team	Pld	W	D	L	GF	GA	GD	Pts
1	Kilmarnock	6	4	1	1	12	7	4	9
2	Dunfermline Athletic	6	3	0	3	13	12	1	6
3	Hibernian	6	2	1	3	15	13	2	5
4	Airdrieonians	6	2	0	4	10	18	–8	4

=== Scottish Cup ===
Round	Date	Opponent	H/A	Score	Hibernian Scorer(s)	Attendance
R1	28 January	Clyde	A	2–0		17,900
R2	11 February	Peebles Rovers	H	15–1		10,453
R3	25 February	Hamilton Academical	A	4–0		11,437
R4	11 March	Celtic	A	1–1		56,000
R4 R	15 March	Celtic	H	0–1		39,243

=== Inter-Cities Fairs Cup ===
Round	Date	Opponent	H/A	Score	Hibernian Scorer(s)	Attendance
R1 L1	26 October	(France) Lausanne-Sports	H	W/O		
OF L1	27 December	(Spain) Barcelona	A	4–4		32,000
QF L2	22 February	(Spain) Barcelona	H	3–2		45,000
SF L1	19 April	(Italy) Roma	H	2–2		35,000
SF L2	26 April	(Italy) Roma	A	3–3		22,000
SF R	27 May	(Italy) Roma	A	0–6		50,000

== See also ==
- List of Hibernian F.C. seasons
