= Walter Galbraith =

Scottish footballer and manager (1918–1995)

Personal information
- Full name: Walter McMurray Galbraith
- Date of birth: 26 May 1918
- Place of birth: Glasgow, Scotland
- Date of death: November 1995 (aged 77)
- Place of death: Wallasey, England
- Position: Defender

Youth career
- Queen's Park

Senior career*
Years	Team	Apps	(Gls)
1946–1948	Clyde	32	(0)
1948–1951	New Brighton	109	(1)
1951–1953	Grimsby Town	77	(0)
1953–1954	Accrington Stanley	21	(0)
Total		239	(1)

Managerial career
- 1953–1958: Accrington Stanley
- Bradford Park Avenue
- New Brighton
- 1961: Tranmere Rovers
- 1962–1964: Hibernian
- 1969–1970: Stockport County
- 1975: Berwick Rangers
- * Club domestic league appearances and goals

Walter McMurray Galbraith (26 May 1918 – November 1995) was a Scottish football player and manager. He played as a defender for Queen's Park, Clyde, New Brighton and Grimsby Town. He then managed Accrington Stanley, Bradford Park Avenue, New Brighton, Tranmere Rovers, Hibernian, Stockport County and Berwick Rangers.

Like most players of his generation, Galbraith's league career was delayed by the Second World War, which meant that league football in both England and Scotland was not held from 1939 until the start of the 1946–47 season. Galbraith played for Clyde for two seasons before moving to Merseyside club New Brighton, for which he made over 100 league appearances in three seasons. He then moved to Grimsby Town, where he stayed for two seasons.

Galbraith was then appointed as player-manager of Accrington Stanley in 1953, making 21 league appearances in the 1953–1954 season before ending his playing career. As manager, Galbraith took Accrington to their highest ever finishing position in the Football League, as they narrowly missed out on promotion to Division Two. He once selected a team of eleven Scots for Accrington in a Football League match, and fans joked that players wouldn't be selected unless they were Scottish. Galbraith resigned in August 1958 after the club's directors advised him that they would be cutting his budget for players.

Galbraith had stints as manager of Bradford Park Avenue and New Brighton. This was followed by a short, unsuccessful stint as Tranmere Rovers manager in 1961. The club was relegated to Division Four and were eliminated from the FA Cup by non-league opposition. Galbraith left Tranmere near the end of the year, when Hibs were seeking to replace Hugh Shaw, who had resigned in November. Bobby Brown and Jock Stein were the preferred choices of the Hibs board, but Brown did not want the job and Dunfermline refused to allow Stein to move. Galbraith was the next choice for Hibs, who had signed Gerry Baker from Manchester City while the club did not have a manager.

Hibs just avoided relegation in both seasons that Galbraith managed the club, but he introduced Pat Stanton into the team and signed players such as Neil Martin, Pat Quinn, John Parke and Willie Hamilton. Galbraith resigned from his position after the club had secured their Division One status near the end of the 1963–64 season, without acrimony or lining up another club. Galbraith was unsuccessful as Hibs manager, but the relative success of his successors (Jock Stein and Bob Shankly) was due to the players mentioned above. In fact, Stein only signed one player (John McNamee) before the start of the 1964–65 season, as he was able to make a good team out of the good players Galbraith had introduced.

After leaving Hibs, Galbraith had brief spells in charge of Stockport County and Berwick Rangers. He died in November 1995, at the age of 77.
