= Jim Blair (Scottish footballer) =

Scottish footballer

Personal information
- Full name: James Blair
- Date of birth: 13 January 1947
- Place of birth: Calderbank, Scotland
- Date of death: 6 April 2011 (aged 64)
- Place of death: Keerbergen, Belgium
- Position: Striker

Youth career
- Shotts Bon Accord

Senior career*
Years	Team	Apps	(Gls)
1967–1970	St Mirren	84	(40)
1970–1971	Hibernian	18	(5)
1971–1973	St Mirren	50	(20)
1973–1974	Norwich City	6	(0)
1974–1977	K.V. Mechelen	93	(14)
Total		251	(79)
- * Club domestic league appearances and goals

James Blair (13 January 1947 – 6 April 2011) was a Scottish professional footballer who played as a striker. Active between 1967 and 1977 in Scotland, England and Belgium, Blair made 158 appearances in the Scottish Football League and the Football League, scoring 65 goals.

Born in Calderbank, Blair played youth football for Shotts Bon Accord before turning professional with St Mirren in 1967. Blair moved to Hibernian in 1970, before returning to St Mirren a year later. Blair played in England for Norwich City between 1973 and 1974, before playing with Belgian club K.V. Mechelen.

Blair died at his home in Belgium on 6 April 2011, at the age of 64.

== Honours ==
St Mirren

- Scottish Division Two: 1967–68

Norwich City

- Football League Cup runner-up: 1972–73
