= Kenneth S. M. Davidson =

Kenneth Seymour Moorhead Davidson
- Awards: Davidson Medal
- Scientific career
- Workplaces: Stevens Institute of Technology

Kenneth S. M. Davidson was a Mechanical Engineering professor at Stevens Institute of Technology who helped create the Davidson Towing Tank at the institution. In 1918 he served as a pilot in the Army Air Service. Davidson was a sailor. He raced in many boat races, one in 1935 to Norway, and the America's Cup defender, the Ranger, in 1937.

== Time at the Institute ==
=== 1929-1935 ===
Kenneth Seymour Moorhead Davidson joined Stevens Institute of Technology in 1929 as an assistant professor of mechanical engineering. In the fall of 1932 asked Olin J. Stephens II for help in locating a high quality model yacht for experiments. Olin gave him a model of the yacht Natka, which measured six meters long. Davidson wanted to run small scale tests, but knew that they were unreliable. Many small scale test were run, but the full scale yacht did not have the same performance. Another problem with the large scale models was they were expensive for small yacht designers to afford. Davidson believed that experiments could help break down complex problems in smaller problems that were more manageable to solve. Davidson also held the belief that only small model could provide cost effectiveness to study all boats. To prove that small crafts could be made in a way that provided good information on craft dynamics he started testing in the swimming pool at Stevens in May 1931. He created a small, portable testing device that he could use after the pool closed at night. The summer of 1931 gave Davidson results that made him take his studies to the next level. Davidson and two assistants constructed a dynamometer and a towing apparatus for more detailed and quantitative work. Since the pool was so short in length and the model they were testing so small, the slow towing speeds. The slow speeds meant that the resistances that the model experienced were also small. This led to many problems. If they were going to use these tests, they had to make sure the speed was very controlled. To meet this requirement, Davidson designed a gear box that would do just this. Early in 1932 Davidson and two students performed tests to see if scaling would be a problem. Since the tests did not produce turbulent flow it was hard to determine anything. He decided to add strips to make up the resistance. Tests with in 1932 with their small scale models and test results from large scale models proved their testing methods. In 1933 Davidson had the opportunity to test his testing methods. The tests turned out to be successful that Davidson began designing a full sized tank for testing. Davidson received the funding necessary to build his full size test pool. The pool opened on June 4, 1935. The tank measured 101 feet in length and 9 feet across and 4.5 feet deep. The tank was fitted with state of the art sensors and measuring equipment.

=== 1935-1940 ===
The early tests in this tank, Tank 1, were focused on how to properly model windward performance of yachts. There were two main goals from these test: to determine the relationship between the wind speed and the force on the sails, and determine the lift/drag ratio of the rig. Davidson released his results from these test in his 1936 paper "Some Experimental Studies of the Sailing Yacht". Not all of the work in Tank 1 was done on yachts. They did some tests on a steamship, which showed they had confidence in their methods. In April 1936, Davidson began testing the Ranger for the America's Cup. The yacht was designed and tested in the tank and Davidson navigated the Ranger to victory in the America's Cup. The success of this and other tests brought recognition to Davidson and his team. By 1939 they started to test many different types of boats. Davidson was then approached in 1939 to run tests on the turning of boats. Since his tank was not able to deal with turns he went back to the Stevens pool after hours. Since the pool was not suitable enough, Davidson contacted Columbia where they let him use their pool on the weekends.

=== 1942-1945 ===
During World War II, the entirety of the work going on in the tanks was for the war effort. The size of his team grew to 63, and Davidson hired women to help build the models. The tank was being used for almost 16 hours a day, every day. Since Davidson wanted his own tank instead of having to go to Columbia on the weekends to run tests, he submitted a proposal for another tank. In 1942 the plan was approved and construction began on Tank 2. Tank 2 was a 75-foot square with a depth of 4.5 feet. Once the tank opened it was the world's first indoor maneuvering basin. This meant that Davidson did not have to go to Columbia to run tests on the turning abilities of boats. Like Tank 1, Tank 2 had state of the art sensors and measuring equipment. In November 1942, Davidson started to run test on seaplane hulls for the Bureau of Aeronautics. The problem was that neither of the two existing tanks were suitable for the tests needed, so a proposal for another tank was submitted. Tank 3 opened in November 1944. This tank was designed for high speed towing. Tank 3 had a length of 313 feet, was 12 feet wide, and 6 feet deep. This tank was able to tow models at speeds of up to 60 ft/sec. A wave maker was also installed to make waves of up to 8 inches tall. Once the tank opened it was flooded with tests on seaplane hulls. By 1944 45% of all the work being done in the lab was on seaplane hulls.
