= Johnny Hamilton (footballer, born 1949) =

Scottish footballer

Personal information
- Full name: John Turner Hamilton
- Date of birth: 10 July 1949
- Place of birth: Glasgow, Scotland
- Date of death: 17 October 2015 (aged 66)
- Position: Midfielder

Youth career
- Cumbernauld United
- Hibernian

Senior career*
Years	Team	Apps	(Gls)
1969–1973	Hibernian	61	(12)
1973–1978	Rangers	59	(5)
1978	Millwall	2	(0)
1978–1980	St Johnstone	41	(6)
- Blantyre Celtic
- * Club domestic league appearances and goals

Johnny Hamilton (10 July 1949 – 17 October 2015) was a Scottish professional football player who is best known for his time with Rangers and Hibernian.

Hamilton began his career with Cumbernauld United before moving on to Hibernian in 1969. He joined Rangers four years later. Hamilton also had spells with Millwall and St Johnstone. Hamilton died in October 2015, aged 66.
