= 1967–68 Scottish Cup =

Tournament details
- Country: Scotland

Final positions
- Champions: Dunfermline Athletic
- Runners-up: Heart of Midlothian

The 1967–68 Scottish Cup was the 83rd staging of Scotland's most prestigious football knockout competition. The Cup was won by Dunfermline Athletic who defeated Heart of Midlothian in the final.

== Preliminary round 1 ==
Home team	Score	Away team
Dumbarton	0 – 0	Berwick Rangers
Elgin City	3 – 1	Albion Rovers
Fraserburgh	1 – 4	East Stirlingshire
Hawick Royal Albert	4 – 0	Vale of Leithen
Stranraer	2 – 2	Stenhousemuir

=== Replays ===
Home team	Score	Away team
Berwick Rangers	2 – 1	Dumbarton
Stenhousemuir	5 – 0	Stranraer

== Preliminary round 2 ==
Home team	Score	Away team
Forfar Athletic	3 – 2	Queen's Park
Keith	1 – 3	East Stirlingshire
Berwick Rangers	2 – 0	Nairn County
Brechin City	2 – 1	Montrose
Queen of the South	2 – 2	Clydebank
St Cuthbert Wanderers	1 – 6	Hawick Royal Albert
Stenhousemuir	1 – 3	Alloa Athletic
Tarff Rovers	2 – 3	Elgin City

=== Replays ===
Home team	Score	Away team
Clydebank	2 – 2	Queen of the South

=== Second Replays ===
Home team	Score	Away team
Queen of the South	1 – 0	Clydebank

== First round ==
Home team	Score	Away team
Aberdeen	1 – 1	Raith Rovers
Ayr United	0 – 2	Arbroath
Celtic	0 – 2	Dunfermline Athletic
Clyde	2 – 0	Berwick Rangers
Cowdenbeath	0 – 1	Dundee
Dundee United	3 – 1	St Mirren
East Fife	3 – 1	Alloa Athletic
East Stirlingshire	3 – 5	Hibernian
Elgin City	3 – 1	Forfar Athletic
Hearts	4 – 1	Brechin City
Greenock Morton	4 – 0	Falkirk
Motherwell	1 – 1	Airdrieonians
Partick Thistle	0 – 0	Kilmarnock
Queen of the South	1 – 1	Stirling Albion
Rangers	3 – 1	Hamilton Academical
St Johnstone	3 – 1	Hawick Royal Albert

=== Replays ===
Home team	Score	Away team
Airdrieonians	1 – 0	Motherwell
Kilmarnock	1 – 2	Partick Thistle
Raith Rovers	0 – 1	Aberdeen
Stirling Albion	1 – 3	Queen of the South

== Second round ==
Home team	Score	Away team
Partick Thistle	3 – 2	Clyde
Airdrieonians	1 – 0	Hibernian
Dundee	1 – 1	Rangers
Dundee United	5 – 6	Hearts
Dunfermline Athletic	2 – 1	Aberdeen
East Fife	0 – 0	Greenock Morton
Elgin City	2 – 0	Arbroath
St Johnstone	5 – 2	Queen of the South

=== Replays ===
Home team	Score	Away team
Rangers	4 – 1	Dundee
Greenock Morton	5 – 2	East Fife

== Quarter-finals ==
Home team	Score	Away team
Dunfermline Athletic	1 – 0	Partick Thistle
Greenock Morton	2 – 1	Elgin City
Rangers	1 – 1	Hearts
St Johnstone	2 – 1	Airdrieonians

=== Replays ===
Home team	Score	Away team
Hearts	1 – 0	Rangers

== Semi-finals ==
30 March 1968

Dunfermline Athletic	1–1	St Johnstone

Tynecastle Stadium, Edinburgh
Attendance: 14,268

30 March 1968

Hearts	1–1	Greenock Morton
Roald Jensen 11'		Stan Rankin 14'

Hampden Park, Glasgow
Attendance: 22,569

=== Replays ===
3 April 1968

Dunfermline Athletic	2–1 (a.e.t.)	St Johnstone
Bert Paton 72'; Ian Lister 118'		65' Alex MacDonald

Tynecastle Stadium, Edinburgh
Attendance: 9,845
Referee: Tiny Wharton

3 April 1968

Hearts	2–1 (a.e.t.)	Greenock Morton
George Miller 68'; Roald Jensen 118' (pen.)		32' Willie Alan

Hampden Park, Glasgow
Attendance: 11,565

== Final ==
27 April 1968

Dunfermline Athletic	3–1	Hearts
Pat Gardner; Ian Lister (pen.)		(o.g.) John Lunn

Hampden Park, Glasgow
Attendance: 56,365
Referee: Willie Anderson

== See also ==
- 1967–68 in Scottish football
- 1967–68 Scottish League Cup
