= Kenny Davidson (Scottish footballer) =

Scottish footballer (born 1952)

Personal information
- Date of birth: 14 February 1952 (age 74)
- Place of birth: Newtongrange, Scotland
- Position: Forward

Youth career
- Loanhead Mayflower

Senior career*
| Years | Team | Apps | (Gls) |
| 1970–1974 | Hibernian | 19 | (4) |
| 1974–1975 | Dunfermline Athletic | 17 | (2) |
| 1975-1981 | Meadowbank Thistle | 190 | (31) |
| Total | | 216 | (37) |
- * Club domestic league appearances and goals

Kenny Davidson (born 14 February 1952) is a Scottish former footballer who played as a forward for Hibernian, Dunfermline Athletic and Meadowbank Thistle.
