= Johnny Graham (footballer, born 1945) =

Scottish footballer (1945–2018)

Personal information
- Date of birth: 8 January 1945
- Place of birth: Glasgow, Scotland
- Date of death: 31 October 2018 (aged 73)
- Position: Midfielder

Youth career
- Strathclyde

Senior career*
Years	Team	Apps	(Gls)
1963–1964	Third Lanark	31	(7)
1964–1965	Dundee United	15	(1)
1964–1969	Falkirk	147	(60)
1969–1971	Hibernian	44	(14)
1971–1977	Ayr United	168	(62)
1977–1978	Falkirk	31	(0)
Total		436	(144)

International career
1970	Scottish Football League XI	2	(1)
- * Club domestic league appearances and goals

Johnny Graham (8 January 1945 – 31 October 2018) was a Scottish footballer, who played for Strathclyde, Third Lanark, Dundee United, Falkirk, Hibernian and Ayr United. Graham also represented the Scottish Football League XI twice.

Graham was signed by Dundee United manager Jerry Kerr from Third Lanark on 10 June 1964 for a fee reported to be £6,000. He made his debut for the club in August 1964 in a 3–2 win against local rivals Dundee. He joined Falkirk in 1965, being bought by Hibernian in 1969 for £15,000.
