= Jim Scott (footballer) =

Scottish footballer

Personal information
- Full name: James Scott
- Date of birth: 21 August 1940 (age 86)
- Place of birth: Falkirk, Scotland
- Position: Outside right

Senior career*
Years	Team	Apps	(Gls)
1958–1967	Hibernian	172	(47)
1967–1969	Newcastle United	74	(6)
1969–1971	Crystal Palace	43	(5)
1971–1973	Falkirk	26	(7)
1973–1974	Hamilton Academical	22	(2)
Total		337	(67)

International career
1966	Scotland	1	(0)
- * Club domestic league appearances and goals

James Scott (born 21 August 1940 in Falkirk) is a retired footballer who won one cap for Scotland and played for Hibernian, Newcastle United, Crystal Palace, Falkirk and Hamilton Academical. Scott was part of the Newcastle team that won the Inter-Cities Fairs Cup in 1969, scoring one of the goals as Newcastle won the first leg 3–0.

Scott won his only cap for Scotland in a 3–0 friendly defeat against the Netherlands in May 1966. His elder brother Alex was also an international; they played together in the latter years of their careers (though usually occupied the same position on the right wing) and later went into business together.
