= 1967–68 Scottish Division One =

62nd season of top-tier football league in Scotland

Scottish Division One
- Season: 1967–68
- Champions: Celtic
- Relegated: Motherwell; Stirling Albion

The 1967–68 Scottish Division One was won by Celtic by two points over city rivals Rangers. Motherwell and Stirling Albion finished 17th and 18th respectively and were relegated to the 1968-69 Second Division.

== Table ==
Pos	Team	Pld	W	D	L	GF	GA	GD	Pts	Qualification or relegation
1	Celtic	34	30	3	1	106	24	+82	63	1968-69 European Cup
2	Rangers	34	28	5	1	93	34	+59	61	
3	Hibernian	34	20	5	9	67	49	+18	45	
4	Dunfermline Athletic	34	17	5	12	64	41	+23	39	
5	Aberdeen	34	16	5	13	63	48	+15	37	
6	Morton	34	15	6	13	57	53	+4	36	
7	Kilmarnock	34	13	8	13	59	57	+2	34	
8	Clyde	34	15	4	15	55	55	0	34	
9	Dundee	34	13	7	14	62	59	+3	33	
10	Partick Thistle	34	12	7	15	51	67	−16	31	
11	Dundee United	34	10	11	13	53	72	−19	31	
12	Heart of Midlothian	34	13	4	17	56	61	−5	30	
13	Airdrieonians	34	10	9	15	45	58	−13	29	
14	St Johnstone	34	10	7	17	43	52	−9	27	
15	Falkirk	34	7	12	15	36	50	−14	26	
16	Raith Rovers	34	9	7	18	58	86	−28	25	
17	Motherwell	34	6	7	21	40	66	−26	19	
18	Stirling Albion	34	4	4	26	29	105	−76	12	

Source: "1967-1968 First Division - SPFL Archive". SPFL.

== Results ==
Home \ Away	ABE	AIR	CEL	CLY	DND	DNU	DNF	FAL	HOM	HIB	KIL	MOR	MOT	PAR	RAI	RAN	STJ	STI
Aberdeen		3–2	0–1	1–2	4–2	6–0	0–1	2–0	2–0	5–0	1–1	1–0	2–1	0–1	6–2	1–4	1–0	1–0
Airdrieonians	1–0		0–2	1–2	0–0	2–0	1–2	1–1	2–2	1–2	3–2	2–0	2–2	0–0	4–1	1–2	2–1	3–1
Celtic	4–1	4–0		3–0	5–2	1–1	3–2	3–0	3–1	4–0	3–0	2–1	4–2	4–1	5–0	2–2	1–1	2–0
Clyde	1–0	0–0	2–3		1–0	5–0	4–3	0–2	6–3	2–2	2–1	2–2	2–3	4–2	5–0	1–3	0–1	2–0
Dundee	0–2	6–2	4–5	3–0		2–2	4–0	1–1	1–0	1–4	6–5	0–3	2–1	3–4	4–0	2–4	1–4	4–2
Dundee United	2–3	1–0	0–5	2–1	0–0		1–4	3–2	2–1	2–2	3–2	3–2	1–1	2–2	3–3	0–0	2–2	9–0
Dunfermline Athletic	4–2	0–2	1–2	1–0	2–0	2–2		1–2	1–3	0–1	1–2	4–0	3–0	4–0	6–0	1–2	1–0	6–0
Falkirk	2–2	3–1	0–3	0–1	0–2	1–2	1–1		4–1	2–3	1–1	1–1	1–0	2–3	0–2	0–1	1–1	0–0
Heart of Midlothian	2–1	3–1	0–2	2–3	1–0	1–0	1–2	1–0		1–4	1–0	3–0	3–2	0–1	0–2	2–3	1–1	2–1
Hibernian	1–0	5–0	0–2	2–1	2–0	3–0	2–0	1–1	1–0		3–3	0–1	2–1	5–1	3–0	1–3	4–2	5–2
Kilmarnock	3–0	2–2	0–6	5–1	0–0	4–0	1–1	3–0	3–2	1–0		3–1	1–1	0–3	1–2	1–2	1–0	5–2
Morton	3–3	4–0	0–4	3–1	0–0	5–2	0–3	2–1	1–0	2–0	3–2		2–1	2–0	3–3	3–3	0–2	2–0
Motherwell	0–3	1–2	0–1	0–1	2–4	1–3	1–1	1–1	2–5	0–1	1–2	2–1		2–1	2–2	0–2	2–1	3–1
Partick Thistle	2–2	3–1	1–5	2–0	1–1	1–0	1–2	2–2	3–3	1–2	1–0	0–1	2–2		3–0	0–2	0–4	2–1
Raith Rovers	3–1	1–1	0–2	1–1	0–2	0–1	1–2	1–1	2–4	2–2	1–2	3–1	3–1	2–3		2–3	3–2	7–1
Rangers	2–3	2–1	1–0	1–0	2–0	4–1	0–0	2–0	1–1	2–0	4–1	1–0	2–0	5–2	10–2		6–2	5–0
St Johnstone	1–1	0–0	1–6	0–2	0–2	2–1	0–1	0–1	3–2	2–3	0–1	1–2	1–0	2–1	1–0	2–3		3–0
Stirling Albion	0–3	0–4	0–4	3–0	0–3	2–2	2–1	1–2	1–4	4–1	0–0	0–6	1–2	2–1	0–7	2–4	0–0	

Legend: Blue = home team win; Yellow = draw; Red = away team win.

== Awards ==
Award	Winner	Club
SFWA Footballer of the Year	(Scotland) Gordon Wallace	Raith Rovers

== See also ==
- 1967–68 in Scottish football
- Nine in a row
