= John McNamee =

Scottish footballer (1941–2024)

Personal information
- Date of birth: 11 June 1941
- Place of birth: Coatbridge, Scotland
- Date of death: 28 November 2024 (aged 83)
- Height: 6 ft 0 in (1.83 m)
- Position: Defender

Senior career*
Years	Team	Apps	(Gls)
- Bellshill Athletic
1960–1963	Celtic	27	(2)
1963–1966	Hibernian	77	(4)
1966–1971	Newcastle United	117	(8)
1971–1973	Blackburn Rovers	56	(9)
1973–1974	Hartlepool United	2	(0)
1974	Lancaster City	12	(2)
1975	Workington	2	(0)
Total		293	(25)

Managerial career
- 1975: Workington
- * Club domestic league appearances and goals

John McNamee (11 June 1941 – November 2024) was a Scottish professional footballer who played in more than 280 league games as a defender for Celtic, Hibernian, Newcastle United, Blackburn Rovers, Hartlepool United, and Workington.

McNamee began his senior career with Celtic and played in the 1963 Scottish Cup Final defeat by Rangers. He was then signed by Jock Stein to play for Hibernian in April 1964, but Stein himself moved in the opposite direction early in the next year. McNamee signed for Newcastle United in December 1966, and was part of the team that won the Inter-Cities Fairs Cup in 1969.

After leaving Newcastle in 1971, McNamee played for Blackburn Rovers, Hartlepool United, Lancaster City and Workington (serving as player-manager of the latter) before retiring in 1976.

McNamee died in November 2024, at the age of 83.
