= Pat Quinn (footballer) =

Scottish footballer and manager (1936–2020)

Personal information
- Date of birth: 26 April 1936
- Place of birth: Glasgow, Scotland
- Date of death: 13 July 2020 (aged 84)
- Height: 1.65 m (5 ft 5 in)
- Position: Inside forward

Youth career
- Bridgeton Waverley

Senior career*
| Years | Team | Apps | (Gls) |
| 1955 | Albion Rovers | 2 | (0) |
| 1955–1962 | Motherwell | 196 | (83) |
| 1962–1963 | Blackpool | 34 | (9) |
| 1963–1969 | Hibernian | 131 | (19) |
| 1969–1971 | East Fife | 64 | (6) |
| Total | | 427 | (117) |

International career
| 1959–1962 | Scottish Football League XI | 6 | (1) |
| 1961–1962 | SFL trial v SFA | 2 | (1) |
| 1961–1962 | Scotland | 4 | (0) |

Managerial career
- 1970–1973: East Fife
- 1974–1975: FH
- 1980: Partick Thistle (caretaker)
- * Club domestic league appearances and goals

Patrick Quinn (26 April 1936 – 13 July 2020) was a Scottish football player and manager.

== Career ==
Quinn began his career in League football at Motherwell under the management of Bobby Ancell where he played alongside other "Ancell's Babes" such as Ian St John. Quinn established himself as a scheming inside-forward before moving to Blackpool in 1962. A year later, he returned to Scotland to join Hibernian and was a key component of the team's midfield under Jock Stein and Bob Shankly. He was a finalist in the 1968–69 Scottish League Cup.

He finished his league career at East Fife, whom he went on to manage. He also coached FH.

Quinn played four times for Scotland between 1961 and 1962. Quinn also represented the Scottish Football League XI six times.

== Death ==
Quinn died on 13 July 2020, aged 84.
