= Joe McBride (footballer, born 1938) =

Scottish footballer (1938–2012)

Personal information
- Full name: Joseph McBride
- Date of birth: 10 June 1938
- Place of birth: Glasgow, Scotland
- Date of death: 11 July 2012 (aged 74)
- Place of death: Glasgow, Scotland
- Position: Striker

Youth career
- 1953–1957: Kilmarnock
- → Shettleston (loan)
- → Kirkintilloch Rob Roy (loan)

Senior career*
Years	Team	Apps	(Gls)
1957–1959	Kilmarnock	57	(24)
1959	Wolverhampton Wanderers	0	(0)
1959–1960	Luton Town	25	(9)
1960–1962	Partick Thistle	59	(31)
1962–1965	Motherwell	88	(51)
1965–1968	Celtic	55	(54)
1968–1971	Hibernian	67	(44)
1971	Dunfermline Athletic	20	(8)
1971–1972	Clyde	12	(5)
Total		383	(226)

International career
1964	SFA trial v SFL	1	(2)
1964–1966	Scottish Football League XI	4	(8)
1966	Scotland	2	(0)
- * Club domestic league appearances and goals

Joseph McBride (10 June 1938 – 11 July 2012) was a Scottish footballer who played for clubs including Celtic, Hibernian, Motherwell and Dunfermline Athletic. He was a prolific striker and has the third highest tally of goals in the Scottish league since football resumed after the Second World War. McBride also represented both Scotland and the Scottish League.

== Career ==
McBride was born in Govan, just 200 yards from Ibrox Park, the home of Rangers. He attended St. Gerard's RC Secondary, Govan and was a prolific goalscorer for their teams (where he played alongside future banker and football chairman Brian Quinn).

He signed for Kilmarnock when he was 15, and was loaned out to Junior sides Shettleston and Kirkintilloch Rob Roy. He made an immediate impact when he was brought into the Kilmarnock first team in late 1957, and was sold to Wolves two years later for £12,500, a significant transfer fee at the time. He was unable to break into the Wolves team in his short period with the club and moved to Luton Town for £8,000 but he was unsettled and made little impact, soon returning to Scotland to join Partick Thistle in a swap deal involving Jim Fleming.

He rediscovered his scoring form with the Jags, with a ratio of over a goal every two games, and his reputation improved further when he signed for Motherwell in 1962 for another £8,000 fee. McBride was Motherwell's top goalscorer in three successive seasons, which attracted the attention of new Celtic manager Jock Stein, who signed him for a fee of £22,000 in 1965.

Along with Alex Ferguson of Dunfermline, McBride was the top goalscorer in the 1965–66 Scottish League with 31 goals. He again scored prolifically during the first part of the 1966–67 season but suffered a serious injury in December 1966, which meant that although part of the Lisbon Lions squad, he did not play in the 1967 European Cup Final.

He never regained a regular place in the Celtic side, and subsequently transferred to Hibernian in 1968. McBride quickly regained his goalscoring form with Hibs, scoring on his debut against Rangers, followed by a hat-trick in his second match against Lokomotive Leipzig, and four goals in his third match against Morton. He was Hibs' top goalscorer in both the 1968–69 and 1969–70 seasons, and scored a second European hat-trick for the club against Malmö FF.

McBride left Hibs in 1971, apparently because the club were unhappy that he did not want to move from his home in Glasgow. He ended his playing career in 1972 after short spells with Dunfermline and Clyde.

=== International ===
McBride won two caps for Scotland, both in 1967 British Home Championship matches. He also scored eight goals in just four appearances for the Scottish League XI.

== Personal life ==
McBride's son, also named Joe, also became a professional footballer who played as a winger for several clubs, including Everton, Rotherham United, Hibernian and Dundee.

McBride died on 11 July 2012, days after suffering a stroke at his home in Glasgow; his funeral took place in Bishopbriggs.

== Honours ==
Celtic

- European Cup: 1966–67

== See also ==
- List of footballers in Scotland by number of league goals (200+)
