= Colin Grant (footballer) =

Scottish footballer

Personal information
- Date of birth: 21 July 1944 (age 82)
- Place of birth: Edinburgh, Scotland
- Position: Forward

Senior career*
Years	Team	Apps	(Gls)
1963–1964	Linlithgow Rose	48	(55)
1964–1970	Hibernian	45	(15)
1970–1974	Chelmsford City	96	(58)
1974–1978	Peterhead	90	(44)

Managerial career
- 1976–1980: Peterhead
- Ellon United
- * Club domestic league appearances and goals

Colin Grant (born 21 July 1944) is a Scottish former professional footballer who played as a forward.

== Playing career ==
Born in Edinburgh and raised in Bo'ness, in 1963 Grant signed for Linlithgow Rose. After a season at the club, in which he scored 55 goals, he was signed by Jock Stein for Hibernian. On 21 February 1966, Grant made his debut for Hibs in a 2–1 defeat against rivals Heart of Midlothian in the Scottish Cup. During his time at the club, he scored 15 times in 41 appearances in all competitions, including once against Lokomotive Leipzig in the Inter-Cities Fairs Cup in November 1968.

Following his departure from Hibs, Grant moved to England, signing for Chelmsford City. Whilst at Chelmsford, he was employed by the Marconi Company. After four years at Chelmsford, during which he scored 62 goals in 118 appearances in all competitions, he returned to Scotland, signing for Highland League club Peterhead, taking up a promotion at the Marconi Company in Scotland in the process.

== Managerial career ==
In 1976, whilst still a player, Grant was appointed as Peterhead's first ever manager, after a selection committee was in charge of team affairs. He remained as manager until 1980. During the 1980s, whilst living in Ellon, he managed Ellon United.

In 2004, Grant joined Aberdeen as head of academy scouting. During his time at Aberdeen, the likes of Scott McKenna, Joe Shaughnessy and Calvin Ramsay were signed by the club.

In 2014, Grant stepped down from his role at the club.
