= Joe Davis (footballer, born 1941) =

Scottish footballer

Personal information
- Date of birth: 22 May 1941
- Place of birth: Glasgow, Scotland
- Date of death: 5 August 2016 (aged 75)
- Place of death: Fenwick, East Ayrshire, Scotland
- Position: Left back

Youth career
- Shettleston

Senior career*
Years	Team	Apps	(Gls)
1961–1964	Third Lanark	59	(0)
1964–1969	Hibernian	157	(34)
1967	→ Toronto City (loan)	12	(3)
1969–1972	Carlisle United	79	(0)
Total		295	(34)
- * Club domestic league appearances and goals

Joe Davis (22 May 1941 – 5 August 2016) was a Scottish footballer, who played for Third Lanark, Hibernian, and Carlisle United.
