= 1967–68 Scottish League Cup =

Tournament details
- Country: Scotland

Final positions
- Champions: Celtic
- Runners-up: Dundee

The 1967–68 Scottish League Cup was the twenty-second season of Scotland's second football knockout competition. The competition was won for the third successive season by Celtic, who defeated Dundee in the Final.

== First round ==
=== Group 1 ===
Team	Pld	W	D	L	GF	GA	GR	Pts
Kilmarnock	6	3	2	1	11	5	2.200	8
Dunfermline Athletic	6	2	2	2	11	12	0.917	6
Airdrieonians	6	2	1	3	7	8	0.875	5
Partick Thistle	6	2	1	3	6	10	0.600	5

Home team	Score	Away team	Date
Kilmarnock	2–2	Dunfermline Athletic	12 August 1967
Partick Thistle	0–1	Airdrieonians	12 August 1967
Airdrieonians	1–2	Kilmarnock	16 August 1967
Dunfermline Athletic	1–1	Partick Thistle	16 August 1967
Airdrieonians	2–3	Dunfermline Athletic	19 August 1967
Kilmarnock	4–0	Partick Thistle	19 August 1967
Airdrieonians	2–1	Partick Thistle	26 August 1967
Dunfermline Athletic	1–3	Kilmarnock	26 August 1967
Kilmarnock	0–0	Airdrieonians	30 August 1967
Partick Thistle	3–2	Dunfermline Athletic	30 August 1967
Dunfermline Athletic	2–1	Airdrieonians	2 September 1967
Partick Thistle	1–0	Kilmarnock	2 September 1967

=== Group 2 ===
Team	Pld	W	D	L	GF	GA	GR	Pts
Celtic	6	5	1	0	14	4	3.500	11
Rangers	6	3	2	1	10	5	2.000	8
Dundee United	6	1	1	4	7	8	0.875	3
Aberdeen	6	0	2	4	5	19	0.263	2

Home team	Score	Away team	Date
Aberdeen	1–1	Rangers	12 August 1967
Celtic	1–0	Dundee United	12 August 1967
Dundee United	5–0	Aberdeen	16 August 1967
Rangers	1–1	Celtic	16 August 1967
Celtic	3–1	Aberdeen	19 August 1967
Rangers	1–0	Dundee United	19 August 1967
Dundee United	0–1	Celtic	26 August 1967
Rangers	3–0	Aberdeen	26 August 1967
Aberdeen	2–2	Dundee United	30 August 1967
Celtic	3–1	Rangers	30 August 1967
Aberdeen	1–5	Celtic	2 September 1967
Dundee United	0–3	Rangers	2 September 1967

=== Group 3 ===
Team	Pld	W	D	L	GF	GA	GR	Pts
Dundee	6	5	1	0	14	6	2.333	11
Hibernian	6	3	1	2	9	7	1.286	7
Motherwell	6	1	1	4	8	13	0.615	3
Clyde	6	1	1	4	6	11	0.545	3

Home team	Score	Away team	Date
Dundee	0–0	Hibernian	12 August 1967
Motherwell	2–2	Clyde	12 August 1967
Clyde	1–2	Dundee	16 August 1967
Hibernian	1–0	Motherwell	16 August 1967
Dundee	2–1	Motherwell	19 August 1967
Hibernian	3–1	Clyde	19 August 1967
Clyde	2–1	Motherwell	26 August 1967
Hibernian	2–4	Dundee	26 August 1967
Dundee	1–0	Clyde	30 August 1967
Motherwell	2–1	Hibernian	30 August 1967
Clyde	0–2	Hibernian	2 September 1967
Motherwell	2–5	Dundee	2 September 1967

=== Group 4 ===
Team	Pld	W	D	L	GF	GA	GR	Pts
St Johnstone	6	4	1	1	10	5	2.000	9
Heart of Midlothian	6	4	0	2	13	7	1.857	8
Stirling Albion	6	2	1	3	6	8	0.750	5
Falkirk	6	0	2	4	2	11	0.182	2

Home team	Score	Away team	Date
Falkirk	0–2	Stirling Albion	12 August 1967
Heart of Midlothian	1–2	St Johnstone	12 August 1967
St Johnstone	0–0	Falkirk	16 August 1967
Stirling Albion	0–1	Heart of Midlothian	16 August 1967
Falkirk	0–2	Heart of Midlothian	19 August 1967
St Johnstone	2–1	Stirling Albion	19 August 1967
St Johnstone	3–2	Heart of Midlothian	26 August 1967
Stirling Albion	1–1	Falkirk	26 August 1967
Falkirk	0–3	St Johnstone	30 August 1967
Heart of Midlothian	4–1	Stirling Albion	30 August 1967
Heart of Midlothian	3–1	Falkirk	2 September 1967
Stirling Albion	1–0	St Johnstone	2 September 1967

=== Group 5 ===
Team	Pld	W	D	L	GF	GA	GR	Pts
Ayr United	6	5	0	1	12	5	2.400	10
St Mirren	6	3	1	2	11	9	1.222	7
Berwick Rangers	6	2	1	3	8	9	0.889	5
Stranraer	6	1	0	5	4	12	0.333	2

Home team	Score	Away team	Date
St Mirren	2–2	Berwick Rangers	12 August 1967
Stranraer	1–4	Ayr United	12 August 1967
Ayr United	2–0	St Mirren	16 August 1967
Berwick Rangers	2–0	Stranraer	16 August 1967
Berwick Rangers	2–1	Ayr United	19 August 1967
Stranraer	1–3	St Mirren	19 August 1967
Ayr United	1–0	Stranraer	26 August 1967
Berwick Rangers	1–3	St Mirren	26 August 1967
St Mirren	1–2	Ayr United	30 August 1967
Stranraer	1–0	Berwick Rangers	30 August 1967
Ayr United	2–1	Berwick Rangers	2 September 1967
St Mirren	2–1	Stranraer	2 September 1967

=== Group 6 ===
Team	Pld	W	D	L	GF	GA	GR	Pts
Queen's Park	6	4	1	1	7	3	2.333	9
Hamilton Academical	6	3	2	1	8	5	1.600	8
Cowdenbeath	6	2	1	3	5	5	1.000	5
Montrose	6	1	0	5	6	13	0.462	2

Home team	Score	Away team	Date
Cowdenbeath	0–2	Queen's Park	12 August 1967
Montrose	2–3	Hamilton Academical	12 August 1967
Hamilton Academical	0–1	Cowdenbeath	16 August 1967
Queen's Park	2–1	Montrose	16 August 1967
Cowdenbeath	3–0	Montrose	19 August 1967
Hamilton Academical	1–0	Queen's Park	19 August 1967
Hamilton Academical	3–1	Montrose	26 August 1967
Queen's Park	1–0	Cowdenbeath	26 August 1967
Cowdenbeath	0–0	Hamilton Academical	30 August 1967
Montrose	0–1	Queen's Park	30 August 1967
Montrose	2–1	Cowdenbeath	2 September 1967
Queen's Park	1–1	Hamilton Academical	2 September 1967

=== Group 7 ===
Team	Pld	W	D	L	GF	GA	GR	Pts
Morton	6	6	0	0	22	6	3.667	12
Queen of the South	6	4	0	2	15	13	1.154	8
Raith Rovers	6	1	1	4	10	15	0.667	3
Dumbarton	6	0	1	5	4	17	0.235	1

Home team	Score	Away team	Date
Queen of the South	0–4	Morton	12 August 1967
Raith Rovers	2–0	Dumbarton	12 August 1967
Dumbarton	1–2	Queen of the South	16 August 1967
Morton	3–1	Raith Rovers	16 August 1967
Morton	6–0	Dumbarton	19 August 1967
Raith Rovers	2–5	Queen of the South	19 August 1967
Dumbarton	1–1	Raith Rovers	26 August 1967
Morton	3–2	Queen of the South	26 August 1967
Queen of the South	3–1	Dumbarton	30 August 1967
Raith Rovers	2–3	Morton	30 August 1967
Dumbarton	1–3	Morton	2 September 1967
Queen of the South	3–2	Raith Rovers	2 September 1967

=== Group 8 ===
Team	Pld	W	D	L	GF	GA	GR	Pts
East Fife	6	5	0	1	16	7	2.286	10
Albion Rovers	6	3	1	2	14	11	1.273	7
Arbroath	6	2	2	2	9	12	0.750	6
Alloa Athletic	6	0	1	5	7	16	0.438	1

Home team	Score	Away team	Date
Albion Rovers	2–4	East Fife	12 August 1967
Alloa Athletic	1–2	Arbroath	12 August 1967
Arbroath	1–3	Albion Rovers	16 August 1967
East Fife	3–1	Alloa Athletic	16 August 1967
Alloa Athletic	1–4	Albion Rovers	19 August 1967
Arbroath	4–3	East Fife	19 August 1967
Arbroath	1–1	Alloa Athletic	26 August 1967
East Fife	1–0	Albion Rovers	26 August 1967
Albion Rovers	1–1	Arbroath	30 August 1967
Alloa Athletic	0–2	East Fife	30 August 1967
Albion Rovers	4–3	Alloa Athletic	2 September 1967
East Fife	3–0	Arbroath	2 September 1967

=== Group 9 ===
Team	Pld	W	D	L	GF	GA	GR	Pts
Clydebank	4	4	0	0	7	2	3.500	8
Brechin City	4	3	0	1	8	6	1.333	6
Stenhousemuir	4	1	1	2	9	10	0.900	3
Forfar Athletic	4	1	0	3	7	7	1.000	2
East Stirlingshire	4	0	1	3	4	10	0.400	1

Home team	Score	Away team	Date
Clydebank	2–0	Brechin City	12 August 1967
Forfar Athletic	4–0	East Stirlingshire	12 August 1967
East Stirlingshire	0–1	Clydebank	16 August 1967
Stenhousemuir	3–1	Forfar Athletic	16 August 1967
Brechin City	2–1	East Stirlingshire	19 August 1967
Clydebank	2–1	Stenhousemuir	19 August 1967
Brechin City	2–1	Forfar Athletic	26 August 1967
East Stirlingshire	3–3	Stenhousemuir	26 August 1967
Forfar Athletic	1–2	Clydebank	2 September 1967
Stenhousemuir	2–4	Brechin City	2 September 1967

== Supplementary round ==
=== First leg ===
Home team	Score	Away team	Date
Ayr United	1–0	Clydebank	4 September 1967

=== Second leg ===
Home team	Score	Away team	Date	Agg
Clydebank	2–4	Ayr United	6 September 1967	2–5

== Quarter-finals ==
=== First leg ===
Home team	Score	Away team	Date
Celtic	6–2	Ayr United	13 September 1967
East Fife	0–1	Dundee	13 September 1967
Morton	3–2	Kilmarnock	13 September 1967
Queen's Park	0–5	St Johnstone	13 September 1967

=== Second leg ===
Home team	Score	Away team	Date	Agg
Ayr United	0–2	Celtic	27 September 1967	2–8
Dundee	4–0	East Fife	19 September 1967	5–0
Kilmarnock	1–2	Morton	27 September 1967	3–5
St Johnstone	3–1	Queen's Park	27 September 1967	8–1

== Semi-finals ==
=== Ties ===
Home team	Score	Away team	Date
Celtic	7–1	Morton	11 October 1967
Dundee	3–1	St Johnstone	11 October 1967

== Final ==
28 October 1967

Dundee	3–5	Celtic
G. McLean; J. McLean		Chalmers; Hughes; Lennox; Wallace

Hampden Park, Glasgow
Attendance: 70,000
