= Eric Stevenson (footballer) =

Scottish footballer (1942–2017)

Personal information
- Full name: Edward McConville Stevenson
- Date of birth: 25 December 1942
- Place of birth: Eastfield, Scotland
- Date of death: 18 May 2017 (aged 74)
- Place of death: Midlothian, Scotland
- Position: Left winger

Youth career
- Edina Hearts

Senior career*
Years	Team	Apps	(Gls)
1960	Heart of Midlothian	0	(0)
1960–1971	Hibernian	257	(53)
1971–1973	Ayr United	28	(3)
Total		285	(56)

International career
1969	Scottish League XI	1	(0)
- * Club domestic league appearances and goals

Edward McConville "Eric" Stevenson (25 December 1942 – 18 May 2017) was a Scottish footballer who played as a left winger for Heart of Midlothian, Hibernian and Ayr United.

Stevenson died on the morning of 18 May 2017 from cancer.

== Sources ==
- Eric Stevenson, www.ihibs.co.uk
- Eric Stevenson at Post War English & Scottish Football League A–Z Player's Transfer Database
