= List of Hibernian F.C. players =

This is a list of notable footballers who have played for Hibernian from the formation of the club in 1875 to present. It generally includes only players who made more than 100 league appearances for the club, but some players with fewer than 100 appearances are also included. This includes players who have set a club record, such as most appearances, most goals or biggest transfer fee.

Some of the players listed made few or no league appearances for Hibs, due to their playing for the club before it entered the Scottish Football League in 1893.

The club first created a hall of fame in July 2010 to mark its 135th birthday. The first group of nominees were publicised in August 2010 and were inducted at a dinner on 15 October. Further groups of players were inducted in November 2012 and February 2017.

== Notable players ==
Players who represented their country while at the club.
Club record holder.
Player inducted into the club's hall of fame.

Key to positions (Note: For a full description of positions see Association football positions.)

- GK – Goalkeeper
- DF – Defender
- MF – Midfielder
- FW – Forward

Bold type indicates that the player currently plays for the club.

As of match played on 16 May 2026

Name	Nation	Position	Hibs years	League apps	League goals	Notes	Ref
Scott Allan	Scotland	MF	2014–2015, 2018, 2019–2022	100	10		
Samuel Allan	Scotland	DF	1907–1912	123	0		
William Allan	Scotland	GK	1908–1916	239	0		
Joe Baker	England	FW	1957–1961, 1971–1972	139	113	(Note: Baker scored the most goals in a season for Hibs with 42 in 1959–60.)	
John Baxter	Scotland	MF	1957–1966	210	22		
Jim Black	Scotland	DF	1969–1974	151	0		
John Blackley	Scotland	DF	1967–1978, 1983–1984	279	6		
George Blyth	Scotland	GK	1929–1935	131	0		
**Martin Boyle**	Australia	FW	2015–2022, 2022–	319	83		
John Bradley	Scotland	FW	1926–1932	181	50		
Ally Brazil	Scotland	DF	1976–1986	203	7		
Grant Brebner	Scotland	MF	1998, 1999–2004	132	7		
Des Bremner	Scotland	MF	1972–1980	200	18		
Bernard Breslin	Scotland	MF	1893–1906	226	10		
Harry Brown	Scotland	FW	1928–1932	133	33		
Scott Brown	Scotland	MF	2002–2007	110	13	(Note: Brown was sold for a club record fee (£4,400,000 to Celtic).)	
John Brownlie	Scotland	DF	1969–1978	211	14		
Archie Buchanan	Scotland	MF	1946–1957	205	16		
**Chris Cadden**	Scotland	DF	2021–	138	5		
Ralph Callachan	Scotland	MF	1978–1986	219	26		
Patrick Callaghan	Scotland	FW	1899–1914	311	68		
**Josh Campbell**	Scotland	MF	2019–	141	19		
Nick Colgan	Republic of Ireland	GK	1999–2004	121	0		
John Collins	Scotland	MF	1985–1990	163	15		
Bobby Combe	Scotland	MF	1941–1957	264	54		
Peter Cormack	Scotland	MF	1963–1970, 1980–1981	200	77		
Alex Cropley	Scotland	MF	1968–1975	125	29		
Jason Cummings	Scotland; Australia	FW	2013–2017	114	55		
Joe Davis	Scotland	DF	1964–1970	157	34		
Ulises de la Cruz	Ecuador	DF	2001–2002	32	2		
William Dick	Scotland	MF	1926–1931	165	4		
Christian Doidge	Wales	FW	2019–2024	104	24		
William Dornan	Scotland	DF	1914–1927	357	0		
Arthur Duncan	Scotland	MF	1969–1984	449	73		
James Dunn	Scotland	FW	1920–1928	268	91		
Alex Edwards	Scotland	MF	1971–1978	142	5		
Tommy Egan	Scotland	MF	1933–1938	133	9		
Gareth Evans	England	FW	1987–1996	247	29		
Samuel Fleming	Scotland	FW	1911–1917	147	41		
Steven Fletcher	Scotland	FW	2004–2009	156	43		
John Fraser	Scotland	DF	1954–1966	195	25		
Edward Gilfeather	Scotland	MF	1926–1930	123	4		
Neil Girdwood	Scotland	DF	1910–1919	179	3		
Robert Glen	Scotland	DF	1898–1907	139	0		
Andy Goram	Scotland	GK	1987–1991	138	1		
Jock Govan	Scotland	DF	1946–1954	163	0		
John Grant	Scotland	DF	1954–1964	225	2		
David Gray	Scotland	DF	2014–2021	126	7		
Sandy Grosert	Scotland	MF	1912–1920	106	4		
Johnny Halligan	Scotland	FW	1920–1933	413	67		
Brian Hamilton	Scotland	MF	1989–1995	195	9		
Paul Hanlon	Scotland	DF	2008–2024	451	22		
Bill Harper	Scotland	GK	1920–1925	178	0		
James Harrower	Scotland	MF	1899–1908	159	3		
James Hendren	Scotland	FW	1911–1915	123	53		
Tony Higgins	Scotland	MF	1972–1980	103	23		
Chris Hogg	England	DF	2005–2011	143	3		
Hugh Howie	Scotland	DF	1943–1954	139	0		
Gordon Hunter	Scotland	DF	1983–1997	339	8		
Mathias Jack	Germany	MF	1999–2003	109	4		
Darren Jackson	Scotland	FW	1992–1997	172	50		
Willie Jamieson	England	DF	1980–1985	117	27		
Bobby Johnstone	Scotland	FW	1946–1955, 1959–1961	199	105		
Paul Kane	Scotland	MF	1982–1991	247	33		
Jimmy Kerr	Scotland	GK	1938–1952	111	0		
Peter Kerr	Scotland	DF	1910–1926	442	15		
Thomas Kilpatrick	Scotland	FW	1915–1920	105	27		
Jim Leighton	Scotland	GK	1993–1997	151	0		
David Logan	Scotland	MF	1935–1941	109	0		
Kevin McAllister	Scotland	MF	1993–1997	109	12		
Jim McArthur	Scotland	GK	1972–1983	217	0		
Joe McClelland	Scotland	DF	1954–1964	182	2		
Jimmy McColl	Scotland	FW	1922–1931	290	130		
Mike McDonald	Scotland	GK	1975–1980	109	0		
Hugh McFarlane	Scotland	MF	1929–1934	150	9		
James McGhee	Scotland	FW	1883–1888	0	0		
Pat McGinlay	Scotland	MF	1988–1993, 1994–2000	323	60		
John McGinn	Scotland	MF	2015–2018	101	12		
William McGinnigle	Scotland	DF	1918–1929	297	4		
Darren McGregor	Scotland	DF	2015–2023	138	5		
Tommy McIntyre	Scotland	DF	1986–1994	126	9		
Ally MacLeod	Scotland	FW	1974–1982	208	71		
Tam McManus	Scotland	FW	1998–2005	109	19		
Jackie McNamara, Sr.	Scotland	DF	1976–1985	236	2		
James Main	Scotland	DF	1904–1909	135	4		
Ofir Marciano	Israel	GK	2016–2021	126	0		
Neil Martin	Scotland	FW	1963–1966	65	53		
Eddie May	Scotland	MF	1985–1989	109	10		
James Miller	Scotland	MF	1935–1939	102	2		
Willie Miller	Scotland	DF	1916–1927	275	30		
Willie Miller	Scotland	DF	1989–1998	244	1		
Graham Mitchell	Scotland	DF	1986–1996	265	4		
David Murphy	England	DF	2004–2008	107	4		
George Murray	Scotland	MF	1922–1928	154	15		
Ian Murray	Scotland	DF	1999–2005, 2008–2012	253	13		
Pat Murray	Scotland	FW	1892–1901	113	42		
**Joe Newell**	England	MF	2019–	179	7		
Garry O'Connor	Scotland	FW	2001–2006, 2011–2012	171	58		
John O'Hara	Scotland	DF	1908–1912	105	4		
Jimmy O'Rourke	Scotland	FW	1962–1974	209	81		
Willie Ormond	Scotland	FW	1946–1961	354	147		
Neil Orr	Scotland	DF	1987–1993	166	3		
Mixu Paatelainen	Finland	FW	1998–2001, 2002–2003	117	39		
Craig Paterson	Scotland	DF	1979–1982	104	4		
Jock Paterson	England	DF	1948–1960	282	0		
Matt Paterson	Scotland	DF	1908–1923	413	36		
Jackie Plenderleith	Scotland	DF	1954–1960	122	0		
Ryan Porteous	Scotland	DF	2017–2023	120	11		
Tommy Preston	Scotland	FW	1953–1964	228	35		
Alexander Prior	Scotland	DF	1936–1940	100	4		
Pat Quinn	Scotland	MF	1963–1969	125	19		
Gordon Rae	Scotland	DF	1977–1990	347	47		
John Rankin	Scotland	MF	2008–2011	100	6		
Lawrie Reilly	Scotland	FW	1945–1958	252	187	(Note: Reilly holds the record for most international appearances while with Hibs, with 38 for Scotland.) (Note: Reilly holds the record for most league goals scored for Hibs, with 187.)	
Harry Rennie	Scotland	GK	1900–1908	196	0		
Derek Riordan	Scotland	FW	2002–2006, 2008–2011	225	90		
Harry Ritchie	Scotland	FW	1919–1928	284	77		
William Robb	Scotland	GK	1926–1930	130	0		
Alan Rough	Scotland	GK	1982–1988	175	0		
Erich Schaedler	Scotland	DF	1969–1985	299	2		
Jim Scott	Scotland	FW	1959–1967	194	48		
Hugh Shaw	Scotland	MF	1918–1926	235	15		
Dean Shiels	Northern Ireland	MF	2004–2009	117	24		
Ronnie Simpson	Scotland	GK	1960–1964	123	0		
Bobby Smith	Scotland	DF	1972–1987	167	19		
Gary Smith	Scotland	DF	1998–2006	158	2		
Gordon Smith	Scotland	FW	1941–1959	310	125		
William Smith	Scotland	FW	1908–1920	311	52		
Alan Sneddon	Scotland	DF	1980–1992	312	7		
Ivan Sproule	Northern Ireland	FW	2005–2007, 2011–2013	115	15		
Pat Stanton	Scotland	MF	1963–1976	400	50		
James Stark	Scotland	DF	1925–1930	124	1		
Eric Stevenson	Scotland	FW	1960–1971	257	53		
Lewis Stevenson	Scotland	DF	2005–2024	477	6	(Note: Stevenson holds the record for most league games played for Hibs.)	
George Stewart	Scotland	DF	1976–1981	109	2		
Bobby Templeton	Scotland	DF	1911–1925	233	4		
Kevin Thomson	Scotland	MF	2003–2007, 2013–2014, 2016	109	2		
Joe Tortolano	Scotland	MF	1985–1996	222	13		
Eddie Turnbull	Scotland	FW	1946–1959	347	150		
Steven Tweed	Scotland	DF	1991–1996	108	6		
Duncan Urquhart	Scotland	DF	1929–1935	202	0		
John Walker	Scotland	FW	1920–1927	195	41		
Rab Walls	Scotland	FW	1932–1940	120	43		
Willie Watson	Scotland	MF	1930–1935	157	13		
Mickey Weir	Scotland	MF	1984–1997	206	30		
Michael Whelahan	Scotland			0	0		
Steven Whittaker	Scotland	DF	2001–2007, 2017–2020	189	6		
Hector Wilkinson	Scotland	DF	1928–1936	259	1		
Willie Wilson	Scotland	GK	1962–1969	101	0		
David Wotherspoon	Scotland	MF	2009–2013	132	7		
Keith Wright	Scotland	FW	1991–1997	197	59		
Tommy Younger	Scotland	GK	1948–1956	177	0		

== International players ==
This is a list of Hibernian players who have been capped at full international level by their country whilst at the club. The Hibernian Historical Trust staged an exhibition of memorabilia relating to these international players at Easter Road during the summer of 2008. Despite the club having an Irish heritage, the first Hibs player to represent a national team other than Scotland was when Bobby Atherton played for Wales in 1899. Lawrie Reilly won the most caps while a Hibs player, with 38 for Scotland.

=== Algeria ===
Algeria

- Abderraouf Zarabi

=== Australia ===
Australia

- Martin Boyle
- Jackson Irvine
- Stuart Lovell
- Jamie Maclaren
- Lewis Miller
- Mark Milligan

=== Austria ===
Austria

- Alen Orman

=== Bermuda ===
Bermuda

- Logan Jiménez

=== Burundi ===
Burkina Faso

- Gael Bigirimana

=== Canada ===
Canada

- Paul Fenwick
- Junior Hoilett

=== Comoros ===
Comoros

- Myziane Maolida

=== Côte d'Ivoire ===
Ivory Coast

- Sol Bamba

=== Cyprus ===
Cyprus

- Alex Gogić

=== DR Congo ===
DR Congo

- Rocky Bushiri

=== Ecuador ===
Ecuador

- Ulises de la Cruz

=== England ===
England

- Joe Baker

=== Finland ===
Finland

- Jonatan Johansson
- Mixu Paatelainen
- Jarkko Wiss

=== Gambia ===
Gambia

- Pa Kujabi
- Alasana Manneh

=== Ghana ===
Ghana

- Jojo Wollacott

=== Guyana ===
Guyana

- Nathan Moriah-Welsh

=== Honduras ===
Honduras

- Jorge Claros

=== Iceland ===
Iceland

- Ólafur Gottskálksson

=== Ireland (IFA) ===
Ireland

- Paddy Farrell (Note: Paddy Farrell represented both the Irish Football Association and the Football Association of Ireland while both associations claimed jurisdiction over the whole of Ireland.)
- Bill Gowdy
- Jack Jones

=== Israel ===
Israel

- Ofir Marciano

=== Lithuania ===
Lithuania

- Deivydas Matulevičius
- Vykintas Slivka

=== Morocco ===
Morocco

- Abdessalam Benjelloun
- Merouane Zemmama

=== New Zealand ===
New Zealand

- Chris Killen

=== Northern Ireland ===
Northern Ireland

- Ryan McGivern
- James McPake
- Colin Murdock
- Michael O'Neill
- John Parke
- Dean Shiels
- Ivan Sproule

=== Norway ===
Norway

- Niklas Gunnarsson

=== Philippines ===
Philippines

- Yrik Galantes

=== Republic of Ireland / Ireland (FAI) ===
Republic of Ireland

- Paddy Farrell
- Nick Colgan
- Owen Elding
- Mike Gallagher (Note: Played in 1954 against Luxembourg.)
- Daryl Horgan
- Jamie McGrath
- Liam Miller

=== Republic of the Congo ===
Congo

- Dominique Malonga

=== Scotland ===
Scotland

- John Blackley
- Kieron Bowie
- Des Bremner
- Bernard Breslin
- Scott Brown
- John Brownlie
- Gary Caldwell
- Paddy Callaghan
- John Collins
- Bobby Combe
- Peter Cormack
- Alex Cropley
- Arthur Duncan
- James Dunn
- Steven Fletcher
- Robert Glen
- Andy Goram
- Jock Govan
- John Grant
- Archie Gray
- Leigh Griffiths
- Willie Groves
- Willie Hamilton
- Grant Hanley
- Paul Hanlon
- Bill Harper
- Joe Harper
- Hugh Howie
- Darren Jackson
- Bobby Johnstone
- John Kennedy
- Peter Kerr
- Jim Leighton
- James Lundie
- Johnny MacLeod
- Murdo MacLeod
- James Main
- Neil Martin
- William McCartney
- Dylan McGeouch
- James McGhee
- John McGinn
- Paul McGinn
- James McLaren
- Marc McNulty
- Ian Murray
- Pat Murray
- Robert Neil
- Kevin Nisbet
- Garry O'Connor
- John O'Neil
- Willie Ormond
- Ryan Porteous
- Lawrie Reilly
- Harry Rennie
- Derek Riordan
- Harry Ritchie
- William Robb
- Alan Rough
- Erich Schaedler
- Jim Scott
- Davie Shaw
- Gordon Smith
- Pat Stanton
- Lewis Stevenson
- George Stewart
- Eddie Turnbull
- Duncan Urquhart
- Keith Wright
- Tommy Younger

=== Saint Lucia ===
Saint Lucia

- Earl Jean (Note: Earl Jean was contracted to Hibs between February 2000 and May 2000. He played in a World Cup qualifier against Suriname on 19 March 2000.)

=== Sierra Leone ===
Sierra Leone

- Azeem Abdulai

=== Togo ===
Togo

- Thibault Klidjé

=== Trinidad and Tobago ===
Trinidad and Tobago

- Lyndon Andrews
- Russell Latapy
- Tony Rougier

=== Uganda ===
Uganda

- Jordan Obita

=== Wales ===
Wales

- Kai Andrews
- Bobby Atherton
- Owain Tudur Jones

=== Zambia ===
Zambia

- Miguel Chaiwa

=== Zimbabwe ===
Zimbabwe

- Munashe Garananga

== Bibliography ==
- Jeffrey, Jim (2005). The Men Who Made Hibernian F.C. since 1946. Tempus Publishing Ltd. ISBN 0-7524-3091-2.
