= 1973–74 Hibernian F.C. season =

Hibernian
1973–74 season
- Manager: Eddie Turnbull
- Scottish First Division: 2nd
- Scottish Cup: QF
- Scottish League Cup: QF
- UEFA Cup: R2
- Drybrough Cup: Winners
- Highest home attendance: 48,554 (v Celtic, 23 February)
- Lowest home attendance: 4982 (v Morton, 29 August)
- Average home league attendance: 14,339 (down 1761)

During the 1973–74 season Hibernian, a football club based in Edinburgh, came second out of 18 clubs in the Scottish First Division and reached the fifth round of the Scottish Cup.

== Scottish First Division ==
Match Day	Date	Opponent	H/A	Score	Hibernian Scorer(s)	Attendance
1	1 September	Partick Thistle	H	2–1	Smith, Gordon	10,597
2	8 September	Heart of Midlothian	A	1–4	Cropley	28,946
3	15 September	East Fife	H	2–1	Higgins, Stanton	9,256
4	29 September	Ayr United	H	4–2	Stanton, Cropley, Duncan, O.G.	8,176
5	6 October	Aberdeen	A	1–1	Gordon	15,158
6	13 October	Falkirk	H	2–0	Higgins, Gordon	9,900
7	20 October	Celtic	A	1–1	Gordon	32,351
8	27 October	Rangers	A	0–4		35,238
9	3 November	Clyde	H	5–0	Stanton (3, 1 pen.), Blackley, Cropley	9,880
10	10 November	Motherwell	A	1–1	Gordon	6,583
11	17 November	Dundee	H	2–1	O'Rourke (2)	11,348
12	24 November	St Johnstone	A	2–0	O'Rourke, Gordon	3,400
13	15 December	Dunfermline Athletic	A	3–2	Duncan, Stanton, Gordon	5,405
14	22 December	Morton	H	5–0	O'Rourke (3), Gordon (2)	5,491
14	29 December	Partick Thistle	A	0–1		6,020
15	1 January	Heart of Midlothian	H	3–1	Cropley (2), Duncan	35,393
17	5 January	East Fife	A	3–0	Cropley, O'Rourke (2, 1 pen.)	5,959
18	12 January	Dundee United	H	3–1	O'Rourke (2), Stanton	10,394
19	19 January	Ayr United	A	1–1	O'Rourke	7,696
20	2 February	Aberdeen	H	3–1	O'Rourke (2, 1 pen.), Gordon	15,744
21	9 February	Falkirk	A	0–0		12,500
22	23 February	Celtic	H	2–4	Duncan, O'Rourke	48,544
23	2 March	Rangers	H	3–1	Gordon (2), Bremner	23,149
24	30 March	St Johnstone	H	3–3	Harper, Cropley (pen.), Duncan	9,705
25	6 April	Dumbarton	A	3–3	Cropley (2, 1 pen.), Duncan	4,730
26	10 April	Kilmarnock	A	3–1	Harper (2), Cropley	7,398
27	13 April	Arbroath	A	2–3	Stanton, Harper	3,410
28	15 April	Motherwell	H	1–0	Smith	10,799
29	17 April	Dumbarton	H	3–0	Gordon (3)	7,859
30	20 April	Dunfermline Athletic	H	1–1	Gordon	10,735
31	23 April	Arbroath	H	2–1	Bremner, Harper	6,788
32	27 April	Morton	A	3–0	Stanton, Harper (2)	3,224
33	1 May	Clyde	A	1–1	Harper	2,712
34	8 May	Dundee United	A	4–1	Cropley, Munro (2), Harper	4,963

=== Final League table ===
P	Team	Pld	W	D	L	GF	GA	Pts
1	Celtic	34	23	7	4	82	27	53
2	Hibernian	34	20	9	5	75	42	49
3	Rangers	34	21	6	7	67	34	48

=== Drybrough Cup ===
Round	Date	Opponent	H/A	Score	Hibernian Scorer(s)	Attendance
QF	28 July	St Mirren	H	2–1	Munro, Duncan	12,000
SF	31 July	Rangers	H	2–1	Bremner, Higgins	28,089
F	4 August	Celtic	N	1–0	Gordon	49,204

=== Scottish League Cup ===
==== Group stage ====
Round	Date	Opponent	H/A	Score	Hibernian Scorer(s)	Attendance
G2	11 August	Morton	A	4–1	Higgins (2), Duncan, Cropley	10,851
G2	15 August	Ayr United	H	1–0	Bremner	5,886
G2	18 August	Dumbarton	H	1–0	Gordon	9,636
G2	22 August	Ayr United	A	2–0	Higgins, Cropley	9,969
G2	25 August	Dumbarton	A	1–4	Gordon	6,731
G2	29 August	Morton	H	2–1	Cropley (2)	4,982

==== Group 2 final table ====
P	Team	Pld	W	D	L	GF	GA	GD	Pts
1	Hibernian	6	5	0	1	11	5	10	10
2	Dumbarton	6	2	1	3	6	6	0	5
3	Morton	6	2	1	3	8	11	–3	5
4	Ayr United	6	2	0	4	6	8	–2	4

==== Knockout stage ====
Round	Date	Opponent	H/A	Score	Hibernian Scorer(s)	Attendance
QF L1	12 September	Raith Rovers	H	3–2	Smith, Stanton, Higgins	5,905
QF L2	10 October	Raith Rovers	A	2–0	Schaedler, Gordon	2,500
QF L1	31 October	Rangers	A	0–2		5,905
QF L2	21 November	Rangers	H	0–0		5,905

=== UEFA Cup ===
Round	Date	Opponent	H/A	Score	Hibernian Scorer(s)	Attendance
R1 L1	19 September	(Iceland) IBK Keflavik	H	2–0	Black, Higgins	13,652
R1 L2	3 October	(Iceland) IBK Keflavik	A	1–1	Stanton	3,514
R2 L1	24 October	(England) Leeds United	A	0–0		27,157
R2 L2	7 November	(England) Leeds United	H	0–0 (Leeds win 5–4 on penalties)		36,051

=== Scottish Cup ===
Round	Date	Opponent	H/A	Score	Hibernian Scorer(s)	Attendance
R3	26 January	Kilmarnock	H	5–2	Stanton, Blackley, Edwards, O'Rourke (2)	14,241
R4	16 February	St Johnstone	A	3–1	O'Rourke (3, 1 pen.)	10,800
R5	9 March	Dundee	H	3–3	Gordon (3)	28,236
R5 R	18 March	Dundee	A	0–3		30,888

== See also ==
- List of Hibernian F.C. seasons
