= 1971–72 Hibernian F.C. season =

Hibernian
1971–72 season
- Manager: Eddie Turnbull
- Scottish First Division: 3rd
- Scottish Cup: Runners-up
- Scottish League Cup: R2
- Highest home attendance: 40,671 (v Celtic, 9 October)
- Lowest home attendance: 1690 (v Motherwell, 28 August)
- Average home league attendance: 14,057 (up 3516)

During the 1971–72 season Hibernian, a football club based in Edinburgh, came third out of 18 clubs in the Scottish First Division and reached the final of the Scottish Cup ending up losing 6–1 to Celtic.

== Scottish First Division ==
Match Day	Date	Opponent	H/A	Score	Hibernian Scorer(s)	Attendance
1	4 September	Heart of Midlothian	A	2–0	Cropley, Hamilton	26,671
2	11 September	East Fife	H	2–1	Stanton, O'Rourke (pen.)	10,891
3	18 September	Dundee United	A	4–1	Stanton (2), Hamilton, O'Rourke	6,674
4	25 September	Ayr United	H	1–0	Auld	9,837
5	2 October	Motherwell	A	1–1	Hamilton	5,757
6	9 October	Celtic	H	0–1		40,671
7	16 October	Aberdeen	A	1–2	Duncan	25,385
8	23 October	Falkirk	H	6–0	Duncan (4), Hamilton, Auld	11,120
9	30 October	Clyde	A	1–2	Hamilton	2,877
10	6 November	Dunfermline Athletic	H	2–0	Stanton, Duncan	9,980
11	13 November	Airdrieonians	A	2–2	Blackley, Duncan	5,263
12	27 November	Kilmarnock	H	3–2	O'Rourke (pen.), Baker, Edwards	7,950
13	1 December	Partick Thistle	A	1–0	O'Rourke	7,259
14	4 December	St Johnstone	A	2–0	Edwards, Hazel	5,825
14	11 December	Dundee	H	1–0	O'Rourke (pen.)	11,383
15	18 December	Morton	A	1–1	O'Rourke	4,166
17	25 December	Rangers	H	0–1		25,145
18	1 January	Heart of Midlothian	H	0–0		36,046
19	3 January	East Fife	A	1–2	Stanton (pen.)	8,217
20	8 January	Dundee United	H	3–0	Stanton, Brownlie, Duncan	8,364
21	15 January	Ayr United	A	2–1	Brownlie, Duncan	6,845
22	22 January	Motherwell	H	1–2	McEwan	10,617
23	29 January	Celtic	A	1–2	Stanton	37,168
24	12 February	Aberdeen	H	2–2	O'Rourke, Duncan	21,389
25	19 February	Falkirk	A	3–2	Hamilton, Gordon, Baker	7,407
26	4 March	Clyde	H	1–0	Gordon	7,191
27	11 March	Dunfermline Athletic	A	1-2	O'Rourke (pen.)	7,277
28	21 March	Airdrieonians	H	1–3	Brownlie	6,052
29	25 March	Partick Thistle	H	3–0	O'Rourke (pen.), Baker, O.G.	8,848
30	3 April	Kilmarnock	A	1–1	McEwan	6,118
31	8 April	St Johnstone	H	7–1	Stanton, Edwards, O'Rourke, Baker, Gordon(2), Duncan	6,358
32	17 April	Dundee	A	2–1	Hazel, Stanton	9,137
33	22 April	Morton	H	1–0	Blackley	7,131
34	29 April	Rangers	A	2-1	Auld, O'Rourke (pen.)	13,124

=== Final League table ===
P	Team	Pld	W	D	L	GF	GA	Pts
3	Rangers	34	21	2	11	71	38	44
4	Hibernian	34	19	6	9	62	34	44
5	Dundee	34	14	13	7	59	38	41

=== Scottish League Cup ===
==== Group stage ====
Round	Date	Opponent	H/A	Score	Hibernian Scorer(s)	Attendance
G1	14 August	Motherwell	A	3–0	Cropley, Hamilton (2)	7,972
G1	18 August	Dundee United	H	2–0	Cropley, O'Rourke (pen.)	20,673
G1	21 August	Kilmarnock	H	3–1	Baker, Hazel, Cropley	7,054
G1	25 August	Dundee United	A	4–1	Baker, Stevenson, Cropley, Duncan	17,133
G1	28 August	Motherwell	H	2–1	Hamilton, Baker	1,690
G1	1 September	Kilmarnock	A	0–0		3,876

==== Group 1 final table ====
P	Team	Pld	W	D	L	GF	GA	GD	Pts
1	Hibernian	6	5	1	0	14	3	11	11
2	Kilmarnock	6	2	1	3	7	9	–2	5
3	Dundee United	6	2	1	3	9	13	–4	5
4	Motherwell	6	1	1	4	7	12	–5	3

==== Knockout stage ====
Round	Date	Opponent	H/A	Score	Hibernian Scorer(s)	Attendance
R2 L1	8 September	Falkirk	A	0–2		6,500
R2 L2	22 September	Falkirk	H	1–0	O'Rourke	9,134

=== Scottish Cup ===
Round	Date	Opponent	H/A	Score	Hibernian Scorer(s)	Attendance
R3	5 February	Partick Thistle	A	2–0	Schaedler, Gordon	21,000
R4	26 February	Airdrieonians	H	2–0	Baker, Gordon	15,980
QF	18 March	Aberdeen	H	2–0	O'Rourke, Baker	25,736
SF	15 April	Rangers	N	1–1	O'Rourke	76,174
SF R	24 April	Rangers	N	2–0	Stanton, Edwards	57,645
F	6 May	Celtic	N	1–6	Gordon	105,909

== See also ==
- List of Hibernian F.C. seasons
