= 1974–75 Hibernian F.C. season =

Hibernian
1974–75 season
- Manager: Eddie Turnbull
- Scottish Premier Division: 2nd
- Scottish Cup: R3
- Scottish League Cup: F
- UEFA Cup: R2
- Drybrough Cup: SF
- Highest home attendance: 38,585 (v Rangers, 29 March)
- Lowest home attendance: 5325 (v Dunfermline Athletic, 15 March)
- Average home league attendance: 13,721 (down 618)

During the 1974–75 season Hibernian, a football club based in Edinburgh, came second out of 18 clubs in the Scottish First Division and reached the third round of the Scottish Cup.

== Scottish First Division ==
Match Day	Date	Opponent	H/A	Score	Hibernian Scorer(s)	Attendance
1	31 August	Aberdeen	A	3–2	Cropley (2), Harper	13,431
2	7 September	Heart of Midlothian	H	2–1	Duncan, O.G.	26,560
3	14 September	Partick Thistle	A	5–1	Brownlie, Harper (2), Gordon, Munro	7,208
4	21 September	Dundee United	H	3–0	Cropley (2, 1 pen.), Gordon	14,328
5	28 September	St Johnstone	H	0–1		13,963
6	5 October	Dundee	A	0–0		8,252
7	12 October	Motherwell	H	6–2	Stanton, Spalding, Cropley, Gordon, Munro (2)	12,389
8	19 October	Celtic	A	0–5		37,605
9	2 November	Morton	H	5–0	Stanton, Harper, Munro (pen.), O.G. (2)	8,342
10	9 November	Dunfermline Athletic	A	1–1	Gordon	8,029
11	13 November	Kilmarnock	A	1–1	Blackley	5,240
12	16 November	Clyde	H	1–0	Harper	8,973
13	23 November	Rangers	A	1–0	Harper	32,887
14	30 November	Ayr United	H	2–1	Stanton, Duncan	10,133
14	7 December	Airdrieonians	A	0–0		4,689
15	14 December	Dumbarton	H	2–0	Harper, Duncan	8,566
17	21 December	Arbroath	A	2–0	Duncan (2)	2,863
18	28 December	Aberdeen	H	0–1		13,190
19	1 January	Heart of Midlothian	A	0–0		35,969
20	4 January	Partick Thistle	H	2–2	Stanton, O.G.	10,117
21	11 January	Dundee United	A	3–1	O.G., Bremner, Higgins	7,580
22	18 January	St Johnstone	A	2–2	Smith, Higgins	6,218
23	1 February	Dundee	H	2–1	Stanton, Higgins	9,788
24	8 February	Motherwell	A	1–4	Higgins	7,552
25	22 February	Celtic	H	2–1	Duncan (2)	29,354
26	1 March	Kilmarnock	H	0–2		7,866
27	8 March	Morton	A	1–0	McLeod	2,314
28	15 March	Dunfermline Athletic	H	5–1	McLeod, Harper, Munro (3)	5,325
29	22 March	Clyde	A	3–0	Munro, Duncan (2)	2,033
30	29 March	Rangers	H	1–1	McLeod	38,585
31	5 April	Ayr United	A	2–2	Duncan, Brownlie (pen.)	4,971
32	12 April	Airdrieonians	H	6–1	Bremner, Smith, Harper (3), Duncan	7,056
33	19 April	Dumbarton	A	3–2	Smith, Duncan, O.G.	2,852
34	26 April	Arbroath	H	2–0	Brownlie, Edwards	8,719

=== Final League table ===
P	Team	Pld	W	D	L	GF	GA	Pts
1	Rangers	34	25	6	3	86	33	56
2	Hibernian	34	20	9	5	69	37	49
3	Celtic	34	20	5	9	81	41	45

=== Drybrough Cup ===
Round	Date	Opponent	H/A	Score	Hibernian Scorer(s)	Attendance
QF	27 July	Kilmarnock	H	2–1	Duncan, Harper	13,272
SF	31 July	Rangers	H	2–3	Harper (2)	28,000

=== Scottish League Cup ===
==== Group stage ====
Round	Date	Opponent	H/A	Score	Hibernian Scorer(s)	Attendance
G2	10 August	Rangers	H	3–1	Harper, Gordon, Duncan	10,851
G2	14 August	Dundee	A	1–2	Harper	5,886
G2	17 August	St Johnstone	H	4–0	Smith (2), Harper, Duncan	9,636
G2	21 August	Dundee	H	4–2	Smith, Harper, Gordon, Duncan	9,969
G2	24 August	St Johnstone	A	3–1	Stanton, Edwards, Gordon	6,731
G2	28 August	Rangers	A	1–0	Cropley	4,982

==== Group 2 final table ====
P	Team	Pld	W	D	L	GF	GA	GD	Pts
1	Hibernian	6	5	0	1	16	6	10	10
2	Rangers	6	4	0	2	16	9	7	8
3	Dundee	6	2	0	4	11	14	–3	4
4	St Johnstone	6	1	0	5	9	23	–14	2

==== Knockout stage ====
Round	Date	Opponent	H/A	Score	Hibernian Scorer(s)	Attendance
QF L1	11 September	Kilmarnock	A	3–3	Cropley, Harper, Gordon	10.022
QF L2	25 September	Kilmarnock	H	4–1	Stanton, Cropley, Duncan, Munro	15,694
SF	9 October	Falkirk	N	1–0	Harper	19,876
F	26 October	Celtic	N	3–6	Harper (3)	53,848

=== UEFA Cup ===
Round	Date	Opponent	H/A	Score	Hibernian Scorer(s)	Attendance
R1 L1	18 September	(Norway) Rosenborg BK	A	3–2	Stanton, Gordon, Cropley	6,537
R1 L2	2 October	(Norway) Rosenborg BK	H	9–1	Harper (2), Munro (2), Cropley (2 pens.), Gordon	12,379
R2 L1	23 October	(Italy) Juventus	H	2–4	Stanton, Cropley	28,963
R2 L2	6 November	(Italy) Juventus	A	0–4		17,989

=== Scottish Cup ===
Round	Date	Opponent	H/A	Score	Hibernian Scorer(s)	Attendance
R3	25 January	Celtic	H	0–2		36,321

== See also ==
- List of Hibernian F.C. seasons
