= 1972–73 Hibernian F.C. season =

Hibernian
1972–73 season
- Manager: Eddie Turnbull
- Scottish First Division: 3rd
- Scottish Cup: R4
- Scottish League Cup: Winners
- European Cup Winners' Cup: QF
- Drybrough Cup: Winners
- Highest home attendance: 49,007 (v Rangers, 28 February)
- Lowest home attendance: 7054 (v Queen of the South, 19 August)
- Average home league attendance: 16,100 (up 2043)

During the 1972–73 season Hibernian, a football club based in Edinburgh, came third out of 18 clubs in the Scottish First Division, reached the fourth round of the Scottish Cup, the quarter-final of the European Cup Winners' Cup and won their first Scottish League Cup and the Drybrough Cup.

== Scottish First Division ==
Match Day	Date	Opponent	H/A	Score	Hibernian Scorer(s)	Attendance
1	2 September	Aberdeen	A	0–1		17,866
2	9 September	Heart of Midlothian	H	2–0	Cropley, Stanton	21,221
3	16 September	East Fife	A	1–0	Gordon	5,590
4	23 September	Dundee United	H	3–1	Gordon (2), O.G.	10,372
5	30 September	St Johnstone	H	3–2	O'Rourke (2), Gordon	10,376
6	7 October	Dundee	A	0–1		11,618
7	14 October	Airdrieonians	H	5–2	O'Rourke (3), Gordon, Duncan	9,989
8	21 October	Partick Thistle	A	3–1	Gordon (2), Duncan	9,197
9	28 October	Dumbarton	A	2–2	Duncan, Gordon	8,252
10	4 November	Kilmarnock	H	4–1	Stanton (2), O'Rourke, Duncan	11,172
11	11 November	Morton	A	3–0	O'Rourke (3, 2 pens.)	4,323
12	18 November	Rangers	H	1–2	Stanton	33,356
13	25 November	Arbroath	A	3–2	Gordon (2), Duncan	4,206
14	2 December	Falkirk	H	3–0	Stanton, Gordon, Duncan	10,606
14	16 December	Ayr United	H	8–1	Cropley, Gordon (3), O'Rourke (3), Stanton	12,510
15	23 December	Celtic	A	1–1	Gordon	42,343
17	30 December	Aberdeen	H	3–2	Stanton, O'Rourke, Gordon	22,229
18	1 January	Heart of Midlothian	A	7–0	O'Rourke (2), Gordon (2), Duncan (2), Cropley	35,929
19	6 January	East Fife	H	1–0	Gordon	17,068
20	13 January	Dundee United	A	0–1		10,832
21	27 January	Dundee	H	1–1	Gordon	15,896
22	10 February	Airdrieonians	A	4–0	Gordon (4)	7,382
23	21 February	St Johnstone	A	3–1	Duncan, Gordon, Schaedler	6,464
24	3 March	Dumbarton	H	5–0	Hamilton, Gordon, Cropley (2), Duncan	12,417
25	10 March	Kilmarnock	A	2–2	Stanton, Higgins	6,700
26	13 March	Partick Thistle	H	2–0	O'Rourke, Cropley (pen.)	13,427
27	17 March	Morton	H	2–1	Higgins, Gordon	11,690
28	24 March	Rangers	A	0–1		52,592
29	31 March	Arbroath	H	0–0		7,344
30	7 April	Falkirk	A	0–1		5,239
31	10 April	Motherwell	A	1–1	Higgins	4,405
32	14 April	Motherwell	H	0–1		8,576
33	21 April	Ayr United	A	1–1	O'Rourke	6,797
34	28 April	Celtic	H	0–3		45,443

=== Final League table ===
P	Team	Pld	W	D	L	GF	GA	Pts
2	Rangers	34	26	4	4	74	30	56
3	Hibernian	34	19	7	8	74	33	45
4	Aberdeen	34	16	11	7	61	34	43

=== Drybrough Cup ===
Round	Date	Opponent	H/A	Score	Hibernian Scorer(s)	Attendance
QF	29 July	Montrose	H	4–0	Hamilton, Duncan, Gordon, Stanton	8,00S
SF	31 July	Rangers	H	3–0	Gordon (2), Stanton	27,111
F	5 August	Celtic	N	5–3	Gordon (2), O.G. O'Rourke, Duncan	49,462

=== Scottish League Cup ===
==== Group stage ====
Round	Date	Opponent	H/A	Score	Hibernian Scorer(s)	Attendance
G2	12 August	Queen's Park	H	4–2	Stanton, Hamilton (2, 1 pen.), Gordon	7,972
G2	15 August	Aberdeen	A	1–4	Edwards	20,673
G2	19 August	Queen of the South	H	3–0	O'Rourke (2), Duncan	7,054
G2	23 August	Aberdeen	H	2–1	O'Rourke, Cropley	17,133
G2	26 August	Queen's Park	A	1–0	Gordon	1,690
G2	30 August	Queen of the South	A	3–1	Blackley, Gordon, Duncan	3,876

==== Group 2 final table ====
P	Team	Pld	W	D	L	GF	GA	GD	Pts
1	Aberdeen	6	5	0	1	19	5	14	10
2	Hibernian	6	5	0	1	14	8	6	10
3	Queen of the South	6	2	0	4	5	13	–8	4
4	Queen's Park	6	0	0	6	4	16	–12	0

==== Knockout stage ====
Round	Date	Opponent	H/A	Score	Hibernian Scorer(s)	Attendance
R2 L1	20 September	Dundee United	A	5–2	O'Rourke (3), Cropley (2)	6,500
R2 L2	4 October	Dundee United	H	0–0		9,134
QF L1	11 October	Airdrieonians	A	6–2	Brownlie (2), O'Rourke, Duncan (3)	6,508
QF L2	1 November	Airdrieonians	H	4–1	Stanton, Edwards, O'Rourke (2)	16,404
SF	22 November	Rangers	N	1–0	Brownlie	46,620
F	9 December	Celtic	N	2–1	Stanton, O'Rourke	71,696

=== European Cup Winners' Cup ===
Round	Date	Opponent	H/A	Score	Hibernian Scorer(s)	Attendance
R1 L1	13 September	(Portugal) Sporting CP	A	1–2	Duncan	30,000
R1 L2	27 September	(Portugal) Sporting CP	H	6–1	Gordon (2), O'Rourke (3, 1 pen.), O.G.	26,041
R2 L1	25 October	(Albania) KS Besa Kavaje	H	7–1	Cropley, O'Rourke (3), Brownlie, Duncan (2)	20,000
R2 L2	8 November	(Albania) KS Besa Kavaje	A	1–1	Gordon	20,000
QF L1	7 March	(Socialist Federal Republic of Yugoslavia) Hajduk Split	H	4–2	Gordon (3), Duncan	28,424
QF L2	21 March	(Socialist Federal Republic of Yugoslavia) Hajduk Split	A	0–3		25,000

=== Scottish Cup ===
Round	Date	Opponent	H/A	Score	Hibernian Scorer(s)	Attendance
R3	3 February	Morton	H	2–0	Higgins, Cropley	15,386
R4	24 February	Rangers	A	1–1	Gordon	63,889
R4 R	28 February	Rangers	H	1–2	Duncan	49,007

== See also ==
- List of Hibernian F.C. seasons
