= 1975–76 Hibernian F.C. season =

Hibernian
1975–76 season
- Manager: Eddie Turnbull
- Scottish Premier Division: 3rd
- Scottish Cup: QF
- Scottish League Cup: QF
- UEFA Cup: R1
- Highest home attendance: 39,293 (v Heart of Midlothian, 1 January)
- Lowest home attendance: 4040 (v Montrose, 10 September)
- Average home league attendance: 13,797 (up 76)

During the 1975–76 season Hibernian, a football club based in Edinburgh, came third out of 10 clubs in the Scottish Premier Division and reached the fourth round of the Scottish Cup.

== Scottish Premier Division ==
Match Day	Date	Opponent	H/A	Score	Hibernian Scorer(s)	Attendance
1	30 August	Heart of Midlothian	H	1–0	Harper	23,646
2	6 September	Dundee United	A	0–1		7,069
3	13 September	Ayr United	H	1–0	Brownlie	8,897
4	20 September	Rangers	A	1–1	O.G.	38,519
5	27 September	St Johnstone	H	4–2	McLeod, Harper, Munro, Duncan	5,572
6	4 October	Dundee	H	1–1	Edwards	8,708
7	11 October	Motherwell	A	1–2	Harper	8,207
8	25 October	Aberdeen	H	3–1	Bremner, Smith, O.G.	11,133
9	1 November	Heart of Midlothian	A	1–1	Stanton	24,471
10	8 November	Dundee United	H	1–1	Brownlie (pen.)	10,633
11	15 November	Ayr United	A	3–1	McLeod, Duncan (2)	4,828
12	22 November	Rangers	H	2–1	Stanton (2)	26,547
13	29 November	St Johnstone	A	4–3	Duncan (3), Brownlie (pen.)	4,484
14	6 December	Dundee	A	0–2		7,360
15	10 December	Celtic	A	1–1	Schaedler	31,918
16	13 December	Motherwell	H	1–0	Stanton	15,991
17	20 December	Celtic	H	1–3	Duncan	21,136
18	27 December	Aberdeen	A	2–2	Bremner, Duncan	18,621
19	1 January	Heart of Midlothian	H	3–0	Duncan (2), Smith	32,923
20	10 January	Ayr United	H	3–0	Harper (2), Brownlie (pen.)	8,083
21	17 January	Rangers	A	0–2		39,457
22	31 January	St Johnstone	H	5–0	Brownlie, McLeod (2), Smith, Duncan	7,839
23	7 February	Dundee	H	4–0	Stanton, McLeod, Smith, Duncan	9,241
24	21 February	Motherwell	A	1–0	Smith	10,518
25	28 February	Celtic	A	0–4		32,059
26	13 March	Heart of Midlothian	A	1–0	Duncan	18,528
27	20 March	Dundee United	H	0–1		6,720
28	27 March	Ayr United	A	0–2		4,733
29	31 March	Aberdeen	H	3–2	Blackley, Murray, Muir	4,082
30	3 April	Rangers	H	0–3		18,820
31	10 April	St Johnstone	A	2–0	Bremner, McGhee	2,182
32	14 April	Dundee	A	1–1	McGhee	6,054
33	17 April	Motherwell	H	2–0	McGhee, McLeod	9,098
34	21 April	Celtic	H	2–0	Smith, McLeod (pen.)	19,076
35	24 April	Aberdeen	A	0–3		11,961
36	28 April	Dundee United	A	0–2		6,669

=== Final League table ===
Pos	Team	Pld	W	D	L	GF	GA	GD	Pts	Qualification or relegation
1	Rangers (C)	36	23	8	5	60	24	+36	54	Qualification for the European Cup first round
2	Celtic	36	21	6	9	71	42	+29	48	Qualification for the UEFA Cup first round
3	Hibernian	36	18	7	11	55	43	+12	43	Qualification for the UEFA Cup first round
4	Motherwell	36	16	8	12	57	49	+8	40	
5	Heart of Midlothian	36	13	9	14	39	45	−6	35	Qualification for the Cup Winners' Cup first round

Source: Statto
Rules for classification: 1) points; 2) goal difference; 3) number of goals scored.
(C) Champions

=== Scottish League Cup ===
==== Group stage ====
Round	Date	Opponent	H/A	Score	Hibernian Scorer(s)	Attendance
G2	9 August	Dundee	H	2–0	McLeod (pen.), Harper	10,851
G2	13 August	Ayr United	A	1–2	McLeod	5,886
G2	16 August	Dunfermline Athletic	H	3–0	Harper (2), Duncan	9,636
G2	20 August	Ayr United	H	2–1	Munro, O.G.	9,969
G2	23 August	Dunfermline Athletic	A	4–0	Stanton, Harper (2), Smith	6,731
G2	1 September	Dundee	A	2–1	Brownlie (pen.), Harper	4,982

==== Group 2 final table ====
P	Team	Pld	W	D	L	GF	GA	GD	Pts
1	Hibernian	6	5	0	1	14	4	10	10
2	Ayr United	6	2	3	1	11	9	2	7
3	Dundee	6	1	2	3	9	10	–1	4
4	Dunfermline Athletic	6	0	3	3	4	15	–11	3

==== Knockout stage ====
Round	Date	Opponent	H/A	Score	Hibernian Scorer(s)	Attendance
QF L1	10 September	Montrose	H	1–0	Harper	4,040
QF L2	24 September	Montrose	A	1–3	Duncan	5,905

=== UEFA Cup ===
Round	Date	Opponent	H/A	Score	Hibernian Scorer(s)	Attendance
R1 L1	17 September	(England) Liverpool	H	1–0	Harper	19,219
R1 L2	30 September	(England) Liverpool	A	1–3	Edwards	29,963

=== Scottish Cup ===
Round	Date	Opponent	H/A	Score	Hibernian Scorer(s)	Attendance
R3	24 January	Dunfermline Athletic	H	3–2	Stanton, Smith, Harper	10,719
R4	14 February	Dundee United	H	1–1	Bremner	13,682
R4 R	25 February	Dundee United	A	2–0	Spalding, Edwards	13,000
QF	6 March	Motherwell	A	2–2	Spalding, Duncan	17,438
QF R	10 March	Motherwell	H	1–1	Stanton	25,658
QF 2R	15 March	Motherwell	N	1–2	Harper	16,000

== See also ==
- List of Hibernian F.C. seasons
