= 1976–77 Hibernian F.C. season =

Hibernian
1976–77 season
- Manager: Eddie Turnbull
- Scottish Premier Division: 6th
- Scottish Cup: R4
- Scottish League Cup: GS
- UEFA Cup: R2
- Highest home attendance: 23,773 (v Heart of Midlothian, 30 October)
- Lowest home attendance: 2835 (v Ayr United, 20 April)
- Average home league attendance: 10,003 (down 3794)

During the 1976–77 season Hibernian, a football club based in Edinburgh, came sixth out of 10 clubs in the Scottish Premier Division and reached the fourth round of the Scottish Cup.

== Scottish Premier Division ==
Match Day	Date	Opponent	H/A	Score	Hibernian Scorer(s)	Attendance
1	4 September	Dundee United	H	1–2	Brownlie (pen.)	7,264
2	11 September	Motherwell	A	2–2	Murray, Scott	6,596
3	18 September	Rangers	H	1–1	Smith	19,606
4	25 September	Aberdeen	H	0–0		9,278
5	2 October	Celtic	A	1–1	Higgins	28,125
6	16 October	Partick Thistle	H	0–0		8,469
7	23 October	Ayr United	A	3–2		4,504
8	26 October	Kilmarnock	A	1–1	Bremner	4,202
9	30 October	Heart of Midlothian	H	1–1	Paterson	23,773
10	6 November	Dundee United	A	1–2	Smith	7,044
11	20 November	Rangers	A	1–1	O.G.	25,072
12	24 November	Motherwell	H	0–2		6,886
13	27 November	Aberdeen	A	0–1		15,771
14	18 December	Partick Thistle	A	1–1	Fyfe	4,068
15	24 December	Ayr United	H	1–0	O.G.	3,875
16	5 January	Dundee United	H	0–0		7,727
17	8 January	Motherwell	A	1–1	Brownlie	7,626
18	22 January	Aberdeen	H	0–0		11,480
19	26 January	Heart of Midlothian	A	1–0	McLeod	24,068
20	5 February	Celtic	A	2–4	McLeod, Smith	27,426
21	12 February	Kilmarnock	A	1–0	McLeod	3,397
22	16 February	Rangers	H	0–0		12,452
23	19 February	Partick Thistle	H	1–1	Smith	5,864
24	5 March	Ayr United	A	2–1	Higgins, Duncan	3,993
25	9 March	Kilmarnock	H	2–0	McLeod, Smith	3,158
26	19 March	Dundee United	A	0–1		6,130
27	23 March	Heart of Midlothian	H	3–1	McLeod, Scott, Smith	13,625
28	26 March	Motherwell	H	1–2	McLeod	6,431
29	30 March	Celtic	H	1–1	McLeod	11,841
30	2 April	Rangers	A	1–2	Smith	12,670
31	9 April	Aberdeen	A	0–0		8,769
32	13 April	Heart of Midlothian	A	2–2	Bremner (2)	10,686
33	16 April	Celtic	H	0–1		22,036
34	20 April	Ayr United	H	2–0	Bremner, Scott	2,835
35	23 April	Kilmarnock	H	0–0		3,457
36	30 April	Partick Thistle	A	0–1		3,794

=== Final League table ===
Pos	Team	Pld	W	D	L	GF	GA	GD	Pts	Qualification or relegation
4	Dundee United	36	16	9	11	54	45	+9	41	Qualification for the UEFA Cup first round
5	Partick Thistle	36	11	13	12	40	44	−4	35	
6	Hibernian	36	8	18	10	34	35	−1	34	
7	Motherwell	36	10	12	14	57	60	−3	32	
8	Ayr United	36	11	8	17	44	68	−24	30	

Source: Statto
Rules for classification: 1) points; 2) goal difference; 3) number of goals scored.

=== Scottish League Cup ===
==== Group stage ====
Round	Date	Opponent	H/A	Score	Hibernian Scorer(s)	Attendance
G4	14 August	Montrose	A	1–0	Scott	3,759
G4	18 August	Rangers	H	1–1	Scott	25,050
G4	21 August	St Johnstone	A	2–1	Scott (2)	3,688
G4	25 August	Rangers	A	0–3		35,463
G4	28 August	St Johnstone	H	9–2	Brownlie (2 pens.), Bremner, McLeod (2), Scott, Muir (2), Duncan	5,740
G4	1 September	Montrose	H	0–0		4,469

==== Group 4 final table ====
P	Team	Pld	W	D	L	GF	GA	GD	Pts
1	Rangers	6	5	1	0	17	1	16	11
2	Hibernian	6	3	2	1	13	7	6	8
3	Montrose	6	1	2	3	5	9	–4	4
4	St Johnstone	6	0	1	5	4	22	–18	1

=== UEFA Cup ===
Round	Date	Opponent	H/A	Score	Hibernian Scorer(s)	Attendance
R1 L1	15 September	(France) Sochaux-Montbéliard	H	1–0	Brownlie	9,454
R1 L2	29 September	(France) Sochaux-Montbéliard	A	0–0		10,000
R2 L1	20 October	(Sweden) Östers IF	H	2–0	Brownlie (pen.), Blackley	12,000
R2 L2	3 November	(Sweden) Östers IF	A	1–4	Smith	1,715

=== Scottish Cup ===
Round	Date	Opponent	H/A	Score	Hibernian Scorer(s)	Attendance
R3	6 February	Partick Thistle	H	3–0	Bremner, McLeod, Smith	13,779
R4	26 February	Arbroath	A	1–1	Blackley	4,256
R4 R	2 March	Arbroath	H	1–2	McLeod	5,773

== See also ==
- List of Hibernian F.C. seasons
