= 1971–72 Scottish Cup =

Tournament details
- Country: Scotland

Final positions
- Champions: Celtic
- Runners-up: Hibernian

The 1971–72 Scottish Cup was the 87th staging of Scotland's most prestigious football knockout competition. The Cup was won by Celtic who defeated Hibernian in the final.

== First round ==
Home team	Score	Away team
Burntisland Shipyard	2 – 0	Coldstream
Elgin City	2 – 0	Stenhousemuir
Gala Fairydean	1 – 5	Queen of the South
Queen's Park	2 – 1	East Stirlingshire
St Cuthbert Wanderers	0 – 3	Brechin City

== Second round ==
Home team	Score	Away team
Albion Rovers	3 – 2	Queen's Park
Burntisland Shipyard	1 – 4	Elgin City
Forfar Athletic	2 – 2	Stranraer
Huntly	0 – 2	Hamilton Academical
Inverness Thistle	3 – 4	Inverness Caledonian
Queen of the South	0 – 0	Berwick Rangers
Raith Rovers	2 – 1	Brechin City
Stirling Albion	1 – 2	Alloa Athletic

=== Replays ===
Home team	Score	Away team
Stranraer	1 – 2	Forfar Athletic
Berwick Rangers	0 – 1	Queen of the South

== Third round ==
Home team	Score	Away team
Dundee	3 – 0	Queen of the South
Arbroath	1 – 3	Airdrieonians
Celtic	5 – 0	Albion Rovers
Clyde	0 – 1	Ayr United
Clydebank	1 – 1	East Fife
Dumbarton	3 – 1	Hamilton Academical
Dundee United	0 – 4	Aberdeen
Elgin City	3 – 1	Inverness Caledonian
Falkirk	2 – 2	Rangers
Forfar Athletic	0 – 1	St Mirren
Hearts	2 – 0	St Johnstone
Kilmarnock	5 – 1	Alloa Athletic
Greenock Morton	1 – 0	Cowdenbeath
Motherwell	2 – 0	Montrose
Partick Thistle	0 – 2	Hibernian
Raith Rovers	2 – 0	Dunfermline Athletic

=== Replays ===
Home team	Score	Away team
East Fife	0 – 1	Clydebank
Rangers	2 – 0	Falkirk

== Fourth round ==
Home team	Score	Away team
Aberdeen	1 – 0	Greenock Morton
Ayr United	0 – 0	Motherwell
Celtic	4 – 0	Dundee
Dumbarton	0 – 3	Raith Rovers
Elgin City	1 – 4	Kilmarnock
Hearts	4 – 0	Clydebank
Hibernian	2 – 0	Airdrieonians
St Mirren	1 – 4	Rangers

=== Replays ===
Home team	Score	Away team
Motherwell	2 – 1	Ayr United

== Quarter-finals ==
Home team	Score	Away team
Celtic	1 – 1	Hearts
Hibernian	2 – 0	Aberdeen
Motherwell	2 – 2	Rangers
Raith Rovers	1 – 3	Kilmarnock

=== Replays ===
Home team	Score	Away team
Hearts	0 – 1	Celtic
Rangers	4 – 2	Motherwell

== Semi-finals ==
12 April 1972

Celtic	3–1	Kilmarnock

Attendance: 48,398

15 April 1972

Hibernian	1–1	Rangers

Attendance: 75,884

=== Replays ===
25 April 1972

Hibernian	2–0	Rangers

Attendance: 67,547

== Final ==
6 May 1972

Celtic	6–1	Hibernian
Dixie Deans (3); Lou Macari (2); Billy McNeill	Report (page 4)	Alan Gordon

Hampden Park, Glasgow
Attendance: 106,102
Referee: Alistair McKenzie

=== Teams ===
CELTIC:
GK	(Scotland) Evan Williams
DF	(Scotland) Jim Craig
DF	(Scotland) Billy McNeill (c)
DF	(Scotland) George Connelly
DF	(Scotland) Jim Brogan
MF	(Scotland) Jimmy Johnstone
MF	(Scotland) Kenny Dalglish
MF	(Scotland) Bobby Murdoch
MF	(Scotland) Tommy Callaghan
FW	(Scotland) Lou Macari
FW	(Scotland) Dixie Deans
Substitutes:
?
Manager:
(Scotland) Jock Stein

HIBERNIAN:
GK	(Scotland) Jim Herriot
DF	(Scotland) John Brownlie
DF	(Scotland) Jim Black
DF	(Scotland) John Blackley
DF	(Scotland) Erich Schaedler
MF	(Scotland) Alex Edwards (c)
MF	(Scotland) Pat Stanton
MF	(Scotland) John Hazel
MF	(Scotland) Arthur Duncan	(substituted off) ?'
FW	(Scotland) Jimmy O'Rourke
FW	(Scotland) Alan Gordon
Substitutes:
MF	(Scotland) Bertie Auld	(substituted on) ?'
Manager:
(Scotland) Eddie Turnbull

== See also ==
- 1971–72 in Scottish football
- 1971–72 Scottish League Cup
