= Drybrough =

Drybrough may refer to:

- Andrew Drybrough (1878–1946), Scottish rugby player
- Colin Drybrough (born 1938), Australian cricketer
- Drybrough & Co, a Scottish brewery of the late 19th and 20th centuries
  - The Drybrough Cup, a football tournament sponsored by the brewery
    - 1971 Drybrough Cup
