= Duncan Urquhart =

Duncan Urquhart may refer to:

- Duncan Urquhart (footballer)
- Duncan Urquhart (politician)
