= Bobby Wilson (Hibernian footballer) =

American soccer player

Personal information
- Full name: Robert Wilson
- Date of birth: 1890
- Place of birth: Chicago, United States
- Date of death: c. November 1918
- Position: Outside right

Senior career*
Years	Team	Apps	(Gls)
- Kirkintilloch Rob Roy
1913–1918	Hibernian	34	(8)
- * Club domestic league appearances and goals

Robert Wilson (1890 – November 1918) was an American professional soccer player who played in the Scottish League for Hibernian as an outside right. He was a part of the Hibs team which reached the 1914 Scottish Cup Final.

== Personal life ==
Wilson enlisted in the British Army during the First World War and died in November 1918.

== Career statistics ==
Appearances and goals by club, season, and competition
Club	Season	League			Scottish Cup		Total	
Club	Season	Division	Apps	Goals	Apps	Goals	Apps	Goals
Hibernian	1913–14	Scottish First Division	20	5	7	5	27	10
Hibernian	1914–15	Scottish First Division	13	3	—		13	3
Hibernian	1918–19	Scottish First Division	1	0	—		1	0
Career total			34	8	7	5	41	13
