= Joe Harper =

Scottish footballer (born 1948)

Personal information
- Full name: Joseph Montgomery Harper
- Date of birth: 11 January 1948 (age 78)
- Place of birth: Greenock, Scotland
- Height: 1.68 m (5 ft 6 in)
- Position: Striker

Senior career*
Years	Team	Apps	(Gls)
1963–1967	Morton	45	(36)
1967–1968	Huddersfield Town	21	(3)
1968–1969	Morton	40	(29)
1969–1972	Aberdeen	102	(69)
1972–1974	Everton	43	(12)
1974–1976	Hibernian	69	(25)
1976–1981	Aberdeen	105	(56)
1981–1982	Peterhead		
1982–1984	Keith		
Total		425	(230)

International career
1969	Scottish League XI	1	(2)
1967–1978	Scotland	5	(7)

Managerial career
- 1981–1982: Peterhead
- 1987–1988: Rosslyn Sport
- 1988–1990: Huntly
- 1990–1992: Deveronvale (co-manager)
- * Club domestic league appearances and goals

Joseph Montgomery Harper (born 11 January 1948) is a Scottish former footballer, mainly remembered for his two spells with Aberdeen, during which he won the three main domestic trophies once each and became the club's record goalscorer with 199 goals in major competitions. He also played for Morton (two spells) and Hibernian in Scotland, and for Huddersfield Town and Everton in England. He finished his career in the Highland League.

Harper played for the Scotland national team five times, scoring seven goals.

== Club career ==
Born in Greenock, Harper started his professional career with home-town club Morton, and returned to the club after a brief, unhappy spell with Huddersfield Town. He had at times a difficult relationship with some Morton supporters, but most fans recognised his ability and enthusiasm. He played for Morton against Chelsea in the Fairs Cup. Harper scored 74 goals in 122 appearances for Morton across both spells. Morton sold him for £35,000 to Huddersfield Town. He later returned to Morton for £15,000.

In 1969, Aberdeen manager Eddie Turnbull paid £40,000 to sign Harper, and in his first season with the Dons he helped them win the Scottish Cup for the second time in their history; Harper opened the scoring from the penalty spot as overwhelming pre-match favourites Celtic were defeated 3–1. He rapidly developed a reputation as a prodigious goalscorer and following a record-breaking haul of 33 goals in 34 league games in the 1971–72 season was the subject of much interest from English scouts.

Everton paid £180,000 for his services in December 1972 but his time in English football was not as productive as his Aberdeen spell and he returned to Scotland with Hibernian in early 1974, for the second time signed by Eddie Turnbull who had by this stage moved to Easter Road. Overweight and unfit when he arrived at Hibs, Harper struggled to rediscover his Aberdeen-era form in Edinburgh. He scored a hat-trick in the 1974 Scottish League Cup Final, but Dixie Deans also scored a hat-trick as Celtic defeated Hibs 6–3. Harper was never a favourite with the Hibs fans, and his arrival signalled the beginning of the decline of the team's fortunes through the late 1970s and 1980s.

Harper returned to Aberdeen under Ally MacLeod for the start of the 1976–77 season in a £50,000 deal and inspired instant success, the Dons defeating Celtic 2–1 (after extra time) to win the League Cup in November. Harper made further final appearances in each of the next two seasons, as Aberdeen lost both the 1977–78 Scottish Cup final and the 1978–79 League Cup final to Rangers, by a scoreline of 2–1 on each occasion. By the 1979–80 season he was considered a veteran and no longer a regular in the Dons first team but his seven goals helped Alex Ferguson become the second Scottish League-winning Aberdeen manager after Dave Halliday in 1954–55. Harper left Pittodrie after only one appearance the following season in the wake of a fallout with Ferguson.

In total Harper scored 205 competitive goals for Aberdeen, a club record. Of that total, 122 were scored in league fixtures, 70 in domestic cup games (including 6 in the pre-season Drybrough Cup, not counted in some totals) and 7 in European competition. His iconic status amongst Aberdeen supporters was recognised when he was amongst the first players to be inducted to the club's "Hall of Fame". Joe's notoriety with Aberdeen fans also earned him the title 'King of the Beach End' (traditional home end at Pittodrie).

== International career ==
Harper was involved in a Scotland overseas tour in 1967, scoring five times (some reports credit him with only three goals, assigning the others to Willie Morgan and an own goal) against a Canada Olympic team; in October 2021 the Scottish Football Association decided to reclassify this game as a full international. Depending on sourcing, this either retroactively set a new Scottish international record of goals in a match, or equalled Hughie Gallacher's 1929 feat (there being an element of uncertainty of whether Gallacher scored four or five times).

He next played for Scotland in October 1972, scoring in a 4–1 win against Denmark, and also took part in the following fixture but then fell out of the international reckoning, only earning a recall in 1975. By coincidence, that occasion was another away match with Denmark, but this was overshadowed by a controversial off-field incident; Harper and several teammates were given lifetime bans by the SFA after it was alleged that they had been involved in a nightclub incident where a light was broken and an altercation followed. Harper later said that he had been punished because he had returned to the team base in the same taxi as the other players. The ban on Harper and Arthur Graham was lifted a year later.

Harper was selected in the squad for the 1978 FIFA World Cup. He appeared in the 1–1 draw against Iran, which was also his last international appearance, as Scotland exited in the first round.

== Later life ==
In 1981 Harper was appointed manager of then Highland League side Peterhead. He helped the Blue Toon to a second place league finish but his reported wages were beyond the club's means and he was replaced for the 1982–83 season by former Pittodrie teammate Dave Smith. Harper later managed Huntly from June 1988 after a successful spell at junior club Rosslyn Sport (which was also the name of a sports shop in Aberdeen, the club later merged with Muggiemoss to form Dyce Juniors F.C.) which he joined the year before. He was then succeeded at Huntly by Steve Paterson in October 1990., He then soon became co-manager at Deveronvale with existing manager Billy Anderson until November 1992.

Harper has also been a columnist for the Aberdeen Evening Express. An autobiography, which was co-written by Evening Express sports editor Charlie Allan, was published in 2008. Harper was appointed honorary Club President of Aberdeenshire Amateur League side Halliburton AFC in 2009. In the early 21st century he often worked on home match days for Aberdeen in as the host of the 'Legends' Hospitality Lounge of the Richard Donald stand at Pittodrie Stadium.

== Career statistics ==
=== Club ===
Appearances and goals by club, season and competition
Club	Season	League			National Cup		League Cup		Europe		Total	
Club	Season	Division	Apps	Goals	Apps	Goals	Apps	Goals	Apps	Goals	Apps	Goals
Morton	1964–65	Scottish Division One	3	1	-	-	-	-	-	-	3+	1+
Morton	1965–66	Scottish Division One	12	6	-	-	-	-	-	-	12+	6+
Morton	1966–67	Scottish Division Two	30	29	-	-	-	-	-	-	30+	29+
Morton	Total		45	36	-	-	-	-	-	-	45+	36+
Huddersfield Town	1967–68	Second Division	21	3	0	0	1	0	0	0	22	3
Huddersfield Town	Total		21	3	0	0	1	0	0	0	22	3
Morton	1968–69	Scottish Division One	34	25	-	-	-	-	-	-	34+	25+
Morton	1969–70	Scottish Division One	6	4	-	-	-	-	-	-	6+	4+
Morton	Total		40	29	-	-	-	-	-	-	40+	29+
Aberdeen	1969–70	Scottish Division One	24	6	5	3	0	0	0	0	29	9
Aberdeen	1970–71	Scottish Division One	31	19	4	2	5	5	2	1	42	27
Aberdeen	1971–72	Scottish Division One	34	33	3	2	6	4	4	3	47	42
Aberdeen	1972–73	Scottish Division One	13	11	0	0	11	15	2	1	26	27
Aberdeen	Total		102	69	12	7	22	24	8	5	144	105
Everton	1972–73	First Division	20	7	2	1	0	0	0	0	22	8
Everton	1973–74	First Division	23	5	2	1	2	0	0	0	27	6
Everton	Total		43	12	4	2	2	0	0	0	49	14
Hibernian	1973–74	Scottish Division One	13	9	1	0	0	0	0	0	14	9
Hibernian	1974–75	Scottish Division One	34	11	1	0	10	9	4	2	49	22
Hibernian	1975–76	Scottish Premier Division	22	5	2	2	8	7	2	1	34	15
Hibernian	Total		69	25	4	2	18	16	6	3	97	46
Aberdeen	1976–77	Scottish Premier Division	34	18	3	1	11	9	0	0	48	28
Aberdeen	1977–78	Scottish Premier Division	31	17	4	4	6	6	2	0	43	27
Aberdeen	1978–79	Scottish Premier Division	28	18	5	3	7	9	4	2	44	32
Aberdeen	1979–80	Scottish Premier Division	11	3	0	0	7	3	2	1	20	7
Aberdeen	1980–81	Scottish Premier Division	1	0	0	0	0	0	0	0	1	0
Aberdeen	Total		105	56	12	8	31	27	8	3	156	94
Peterhead	1981–82	Highland League	-	-	-	-	-	-	-	-	-	-
Keith	1982–83	Highland League	-	-	-	-	-	-	-	-	-	-
Keith	1983–84	Highland League	-	-	-	-	-	-	-	-	-	-
Career total			425	230	32+	19+	74+	67+	22	11	553+	327+

=== International ===
Appearances and goals by national team and year
National team	Year	Apps	Goals
Scotland	1967	1	5
Scotland	1972	2	1
Scotland	1975	1	1
Scotland	1978	1	0
Total		5	7

Scores and results list Scotland's goal tally first

No.	Date	Venue	Opponent	Score	Result	Competition	Ref
1.	13 June 1967	Alexander Park, Winnipeg	Canada Olympic team	1–0	7–2	Friendly match	
2.	13 June 1967	Alexander Park, Winnipeg	Canada Olympic team	2–0	7–2	Friendly match	
3.	13 June 1967	Alexander Park, Winnipeg	Canada Olympic team	3–0	7–2	Friendly match	
4.	13 June 1967	Alexander Park, Winnipeg	Canada Olympic team	5–1	7–2	Friendly match	
5.	13 June 1967	Alexander Park, Winnipeg	Canada Olympic team	6–1	7–2	Friendly match	
6.	18 October 1972	Idraetsparken, Copenhagen	Denmark	3–1	4–1	1974 FIFA World Cup qualification	
7.	3 September 1975	Idraetsparken, Copenhagen	Denmark	1–0	1–0	UEFA Euro 1976 qualifying	

== Honours ==
Greenock Morton

- Scottish Second Division: 1966–67
- Renfrewshire Cup: 1966–67

Aberdeen

- Scottish Premier Division: 1979–80
- Scottish Cup: 1969–70
- Scottish League Cup: 1976–77
- Drybrough Cup: 1971–72
- Aberdeenshire Cup: 1980–81

Individual

- European Bronze Boot: 1971–72
- Scottish Football Hall of Fame: 2019
- Greenock Morton Hall of Fame: 2024

== See also ==
- List of footballers in Scotland by number of league goals (200+)
- List of Scotland national football team hat-tricks
