= Jack Cropley =

Scottish footballer

Personal information
- Date of birth: 27 September 1924
- Place of birth: Edinburgh, Scotland
- Date of death: 29 October 2009 (aged 85)
- Place of death: Edinburgh, Scotland
- Position: Wing half

Senior career*
Years	Team	Apps	(Gls)
- Tranent
1947–1954	Aldershot	162	(3)
- Weymouth
- * Club domestic league appearances and goals

Jack Cropley (27 September 1924 – 29 October 2009) was a Scottish professional footballer who played as a wing half.

== Career ==
Born in Edinburgh, Cropley played for Tranent, Aldershot and Weymouth.

== Personal life ==
He is the father of Alex Cropley.
