= 1913–14 Hibernian F.C. season =

Hibernian
1913–14 season
- Manager: Dan McMichael
- Scottish First Division: 13th
- Scottish Cup: Finalists
- Average home league attendance: 13,721 (down 618)

During the 1913–14 season Hibernian, a football club based in Edinburgh, finished thirteenth out of 20 clubs in the Scottish First Division.

== Scottish First Division ==
| Match Day | Date | Opponent | H/A | Score | Hibernian Scorer(s) | Attendance |
|---|---|---|---|---|---|---|
| 1 | 16 August | Third Lanark | A | 1–2 | | 12,000 |
| 2 | 23 August | Aberdeen | H | 1–0 | | 12,000 |
| 3 | 30 August | Raith Rovers | A | 1–1 | | 4,000 |
| 4 | 6 September | Celtic | H | 1–2 | | 15,000 |
| 5 | 13 September | Hamilton Academical | A | 1–0 | | 4,000 |
| 6 | 15 September | Rangersd | H | 0–3 | | 12,000 |
| 7 | 20 September | Partick Thistle | H | 0–2 | | 6,000 |
| 8 | 27 September | Kilmarnock | A | 3–0 | | 4,000 |
| 9 | 4 October | Dundee | H | 4–1 | | 8,000 |
| 10 | 11 October | Dumbarton | A | 3–0 | | 7,000 |
| 11 | 18 October | Falkirk | H | 0–3 | | 12,000 |
| 12 | 25 October | Motherwell | A | 3–2 | | 5,000 |
| 13 | 1 November | Clyde | H | 1–1 | | 4,000 |
| 14 | 8 November | Heart of Midlothian | H | 1–2 | | 21,000 |
| 15 | 15 November | Queen's Park | A | 2–4 | | 6,000 |
| 16 | 22 November | Airdrieonians | H | 1–4 | | 10,000 |
| 17 | 29 November | Morton | A | 1–2 | | 8,000 |
| 18 | 6 December | St Mirren | A | 3–3 | | 4,000 |
| 19 | 13 December | Hamilton Academical | H | 6–0 | | 6,000 |
| 20 | 20 December | Ayr United | A | 2–1 | | 5,000 |
| 21 | 27 December | Third Lanark | H | 1–0 | | 1,500 |
| 22 | 3 January | Dundee | A | 2–2 | | 12,000 |
| 23 | 10 January | Raith Rovers | H | 0–3 | | 8,000 |
| 24 | 17 January | Kilmarnock | H | 0–1 | | 7,000 |
| 25 | 24 January | Partick Thistle | A | 0–3 | | 7,000 |
| 26 | 31 January | Ayr United | H | 0–5 | | 6,000 |
| 27 | 14 February | Heart of Midlothian | A | 1–3 | | 16,000 |
| 28 | 28 February | Clyde | A | 0–4 | | 5,000 |
| 29 | 14 March | Queen's Park | H | 2–3 | | 6,000 |
| 30 | 18 March | St Mirren | H | 5–3 | | 5,000 |
| 31 | 21 March | Aberdeen | A | 2–1 | | 4,000 |
| 32 | 25 March | Morton | H | 1–2 | | 5,000 |
| 33 | 4 April | Falkirk | A | 2–3 | | 4,500 |
| 34 | 7 April | Rangers | A | 1–1 | | 4,000 |
| 35 | 15 April | Dumbarton | H | 1–1 | | 5,000 |
| 36 | 18 April | Celtic | A | 0–3 | | 12,000 |
| 37 | 25 April | Airdrieonians | A | 3–4 | | 5,000 |
| 38 | 28 April | Motherwell | H | 2–0 | | 4,000 |

=== Final League table ===
| P | Team | Pld | W | D | L | GF | GA | GD | Pts |
|---|---|---|---|---|---|---|---|---|---|
| 12 | Kilmarnock | 38 | 11 | 9 | 18 | 48 | 68 | –20 | 31 |
| 13 | Hibernian | 38 | 12 | 6 | 20 | 58 | 75 | –17 | 30 |
| 14 | Aberdeen | 38 | 10 | 10 | 18 | 38 | 55 | –17 | 30 |

=== Scottish Cup ===
| Round | Date | Opponent | H/A | Score | Hibernian Scorer(s) | Attendance |
|---|---|---|---|---|---|---|
| R2 | 7 February | Morton | A | 1–1 | | 10,000 |
| R2 R | 11 February | Morton | H | 2–1 | | 13,000 |
| R3 | 21 February | Rangers | H | 2–1 | | 28,000 |
| R4 | 7 March | Queen's Park | A | 3–1 | | 55,000 |
| SF | 28 March | St Mirren | N | 3–1 | | 30,000 |
| F | 11 April | Celtic | N | 0–0 | | 56,000 |
| F R | 16 April | Celtic | N | 1–4 | | 36,000 |

== See also ==
- List of Hibernian F.C. seasons
