= 1972–73 Everton F.C. season =

English football club season

Everton
1972–73 season
- Manager: Harry Catterick (until 15 April 1973); Tommy Eggleston (caretaker from 15 April 1973)
- Ground: Goodison Park
- First Division: 17th
- FA Cup: Fourth Round
- League Cup: Second Round
- Top goalscorer: League: John Connolly, Joe Harper, Joe Royle (7); All: Joe Harper (8)
Home colours	Away colours	Third colours

During the 1972–73 English football season, Everton F.C. competed in the Football League First Division. They finished 17th in the table with 37 points.

== Final league table ==
Pos	Team	Pld	W	D	L	GF	GA	GAv	Pts	Qualification or relegation
15	Stoke City	42	14	10	18	61	56	1.089	38	Qualification for the Watney Cup (Note: West Ham United and Stoke City qualified for the Watney Cup as the two teams with the most goals that hadn't already qualified for a European competition.)
16	Leicester City	42	10	17	15	40	46	0.870	37	
17	Everton	42	13	11	18	41	49	0.837	37	
18	Manchester United	42	12	13	17	44	60	0.733	37	
19	Coventry City	42	13	9	20	40	55	0.727	35	

Source: World Football
Rules for classification: 1) Points; 2) Goal average; 3) Goals scored

== Results ==
Win	Draw	Loss

=== Football League First Division ===
Date	Opponent	Venue	Result	Attendance	Scorers
12 August 1972	Norwich City	A	1–1		
16 August 1972	Manchester City	A	1–0		
19 August 1972	Manchester United	H	2–0		
22 August 1972	Crystal Palace	H	1–1		
26 August 1972	Stoke City	A	1–1		
29 August 1972	Derby County	H	1–0		
2 September 1972	West Bromwich Albion	H	1–0		
9 September 1972	Leicester City	A	2–1	21,080	
16 September 1972	Southampton	H	0–1	37,739	
23 September 1972	Birmingham City	A	1–2	37,333	
30 September 1972	Newcastle United	H	3–1	33,028	
7 October 1972	Liverpool	A	0–1	55,975	
14 October 1972	Leeds United	H	1–2		
21 October 1972	Sheffield United	A	1–0		
28 October 1972	Ipswich Town	H	2–2		
4 November 1972	Crystal Palace	A	0–1		
11 November 1972	Manchester City	H	2–3		
18 November 1972	Arsenal	A	0–1		
25 November 1972	West Ham United	H	1–2		
2 December 1972	Coventry City	A	0–1		
9 December 1972	Wolverhampton Wanderers	H	0–1		
16 December 1972	Tottenham Hotspur	H	3–1		
23 December 1972	Chelsea	A	1–1		
26 December 1972	Birmingham City	H	1–1		
6 January 1973	Stoke City	H	2–0		
24 January 1973	Manchester United	A	0–0		
27 January 1973	Leicester City	H	0–1		
10 February 1973	Southampton	A	0–0		
24 February 1973	Tottenham Hotspur	A	0–3		
3 March 1973	Liverpool	H	0–2		
10 March 1973	Leeds United	A	1–2		
17 March 1973	Sheffield United	H	2–1		
24 March 1973	Ipswich Town	A	1–0		
31 March 1973	West Ham United	A	0–2		
3 April 1973	Norwich City	H	2–2		
7 April 1973	Coventry City	H	2–0		
11 April 1973	West Bromwich Albion	A	1–4		
14 April 1973	Wolverhampoton Wandeerers	A	2–4		
17 April 1973	Chelsea	H	1–0		
21 April 1973	Arsenal	H	0–0		
25 April 1973	Newcastle United	A	0–0		
28 April 1973	Derby County	A	1–3		

=== FA Cup ===
Round	Date	Opponent	Venue	Result	Attendance	Goalscorers
3	13 January 1973	Aston Villa	H	3–2		
4	3 February 1973	Millwall	H	0–2		

=== League Cup ===
Round	Date	Opponent	Venue	Result	Attendance	Goalscorers
2	5 September 1972	Arsenal	A	0–1		
