= Drybrough & Co =

Former brewery in Edinburgh, Scotland

Drybrough & Co was a brewery in Edinburgh, Scotland, from 1895 to 1987. Members of the Drybrough family had been brewing beer in Edinburgh since before 1750. In 1892 they moved to a new factory at a greenfield site in Craigmillar, designed by Robert Hamilton-Paterson. It was the second brewery established in Craigmillar. The new company was established in 1895 and sold beer in south and west Scotland. They also supplied a brewery in Northumberland and one in Dundee. In 1965 they were taken over by Watney Mann, and in 1987 the company was bought by Allied Lyons, who closed the brewery. Production ended on 23 January 1987.

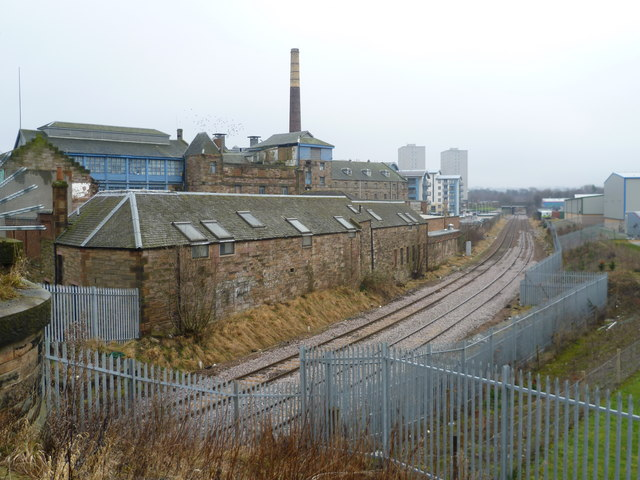
The old Drybrough Brewery from Duddingston_Road_West, Edinburgh

The brewery established the Drybrough Cup in 1971.
