= John Grant (Scottish footballer) =

Scottish footballer (1931–2021)

Personal information
- Date of birth: 16 June 1931
- Place of birth: Edinburgh, Scotland
- Date of death: 28 January 2021 (aged 89)
- Position: Defender

Youth career
- Merchiston Thistle
- 1949–1954: Hibernian

Senior career*
Years	Team	Apps	(Gls)
1954–1964	Hibernian	224	(2)
1964–1965	Raith Rovers	28	(0)
Total		252	(2)

International career
1958	Scotland	2	(0)
1958–1961	Scottish League XI	6	(0)
- * Club domestic league appearances and goals

John Grant (16 June 1931 – 28 January 2021) was a Scottish professional footballer, who played for Hibernian, Raith Rovers and the Scotland national team.

Grant signed for Hibs in 1949, but had to wait until 1954 to make his league debut due to the strength of the Hibs side in the early 1950s. Hibs won the league championship in 1951 and 1952, and were denied a third successive championship in 1953 on goal average. Grant was a stalwart of the Hibs side for the following decade, but he was released by Jock Stein in 1964. Grant played for Raith Rovers for a further season before retiring from the game.

Grant played for Scotland twice, against Northern Ireland and Wales during the 1959 British Home Championship. He also represented the Scottish League XI.
