= Samuel Fleming =

Scottish footballer

Personal information
- Full name: Samuel Fleming
- Date of birth: 29 September 1891
- Place of birth: Shettleston, Scotland
- Date of death: 15 August 1951 (aged 59)
- Place of death: Glasgow, Scotland
- Height: 5 ft 8 in (1.73 m)
- Position: Inside right

Youth career
- Tollcross Ramblers
- Deanston

Senior career*
Years	Team	Apps	(Gls)
–	Vale of Clyde		
1911–1918	Hibernian	147	(41)
1918	St Mirren	1	(0)
1918–1922	Clyde	64	(17)
1922–1924	Albion Rovers	45	(15)
1926	Johnstone	1	(0)
Total		260	(73)
- * Club domestic league appearances and goals

Samuel Fleming (29 September 1891 – 15 August 1951) was a Scottish footballer who played as an inside right, primarily for Hibernian where he played regularly six seasons from 1911 and 1917; he took part in the 1914 Scottish Cup Final which Hibs lost to Celtic after a replay.

After a year of being registered with Hibernian but without playing for them (the absence possibly relating to World War I commitments) he signed St Mirren, but only stayed there for a matter of weeks, making one Scottish Football League appearance before moving on to Clyde. He remained at Shawfield for four years and was part of a team defeated in a final by Celtic for a second time, this time in the Glasgow Cup of 1920. Fleming signed for Albion Rovers in 1922, and after seemingly having retired two years later, he made another single appearance for a Renfrewshire-based club, this time third-tier Johnstone, in 1926.
