= Jim Black (footballer) =

Scottish footballer and manager

Personal information
- Date of birth: 13 November 1943 (age 82)
- Place of birth: Airdrie, Scotland
- Position: Defender

Youth career
- Lochend Hearts

Senior career*
| Years | Team | Apps | (Gls) |
| 1962–1969 | Airdrieonians | 144 | (0) |
| 1969–1974 | Hibernian | 152 | (0) |
| 1974–1979 | Airdrieonians | 148 | (3) |
| 1979–1982 | Stenhousemuir | 96 | (0) |
| Total | | 540 | (3) |

Managerial career
- 1981–1984: Stenhousemuir
- * Club domestic league appearances and goals

Jim Black (born 13 November 1943 in Airdrie) is a Scottish former footballer who played as a defender for Airdrie, Hibernian and Stenhousemuir. He was part of the Hibs side that won the Scottish League Cup in 1972 and the Drybrough Cup twice. Black also played in the Scottish Cup finals of 1972 and 1975.

In March 2016 Black was inaugurated into Airdrieonians Greatest XI, a poll conducted amongst Airdrie fans to find the greatest starting line up in the history of the club.

== See also ==
- List of footballers in Scotland by number of league appearances (500+)
