= 1973–74 Everton F.C. season =

English football club season

Everton
1973–74 season
- Manager: Billy Bingham
- Ground: Goodison Park
- First Division: 7th
- FA Cup: Fourth Round
- League Cup: Third Round
- Texaco Cup: First Round
- Top goalscorer: League: Mick Lyons (9); All: Mick Lyons (9)

During the 1973–74 English football season, Everton F.C. competed in the Football League First Division. They finished 7th in the table with 44 points.

== Final League Table ==
Pos	Team	Pld	W	D	L	GF	GA	GAv	Pts	Qualification or relegation
5	Stoke City	42	15	16	11	54	42	1.286	46	Qualification for the UEFA Cup first round
6	Burnley	42	16	14	12	56	53	1.057	46	
7	Everton	42	16	12	14	50	48	1.042	44	
8	Queens Park Rangers	42	13	17	12	56	52	1.077	43	
9	Leicester City	42	13	16	13	51	41	1.244	42	

Source: World Football
Rules for classification: 1) Points; 2) Goal average; 3) Goals scored

== Results ==
Win	Draw	Loss

=== Football League First Division ===
Date	Opponent	Venue	Result	Attendance	Scorers
25 August 1973	Leeds United	A	1–3		
28 August 1973	Leicester City	H	1–1		
1 September 1973	Ipswich Town	H	3–0		
5 September 1973	Stoke City	A	0–0		
8 September 1973	Derby County	A	1–2		
11 September 1973	Stoke City	H	1–1		
15 September 1973	Queen's Park Rangers	H	1–0		
22 September 1973	Wolverhampton Wanderers	A	1–1		
29 September 1973	Arsenal	H	1–0		
6 October 1973	Coventry City	A	2–1		
13 October 1973	West Ham United	H	1–0		
20 October 1973	Burnley	H	1–0		
27 October 1973	Birmingham City	A	2–0		
3 November 1973	Tottenham Hotspur	H	1–1		
10 November 1973	Chelsea	A	1–3		
17 November 1973	Norwich City	A	3–1		
24 November 1973	Newcastle United	H	1–1		
1 December 1973	Southampton	A	0–2		
8 December 1973	Liverpool	H	0–1		
15 December 1973	Sheffield United	H	1–1		
22 December 1973	Arsenal	A	0–1		
26 December 1973	Manchester City	H	2–0		
29 December 1973	Derby County	H	2–1		
1 January 1974	Ipswich Town	A	0–3		
12 January 1974	Queen's Park Rangers	A	0–1		
19 January 1974	Leeds United	H	0–0		
2 February 1974	Sheffield United	A	1–1		
9 February 1974	Wolverhampton Wanderers	H	2–1		
16 February 1974	West Ham United	A	3–4		
23 February 1974	Coventry City	H	1–0		
2 March 1974	Leicester City	A	1–2		
9 March 1974	Birmingham City	H	4–1		
16 March 1974	Burnley	A	1–3		
23 March 1974	Chelsea	H	1–1		
30 March 1974	Tottenham Hotspur	A	2–0		
2 April 1974	Manchester City	A	1–1		
6 April 1974	Newcastle United	A	1–2		
13 April 1974	Norwich City	H	4–1		
15 April 1974	Manchester United	A	0–3		
20 April 1974	Liverpool	A	0–0		
23 April 1974	Manchester United	H	1–0		
27 April 1974	Southampton	H	0–3		

=== FA Cup ===
Round	Date	Opponent	Venue	Result	Attendance	Goalscorers
3	5 January 1974	Blackburn Rovers	H	3–0		
4	27 January 1974	West Bromwich Albion	H	0–0		
4:R	30 January 1974	West Bromwich Albion	A	0–1		

=== League Cup ===
Round	Date	Opponent	Venue	Result	Attendance	Goalscorers
2	8 October 1973	Reading	H	1–0	15,772	
3	30 October 1973	Norwich City	H	0–1	22,046	

=== Texaco Cup ===
Round	Date	Opponent	Venue	Result	Attendance	Goalscorers
1:1	18 September 1973	Heart of Midlothian	H	0–1		
1:2	3 October 1973	Heart of Midlothian	A	0–0		

== Squad ==
>
