= William Allan (footballer, born 1880) =

Scottish footballer

Personal information
- Full name: William Roberts Allan
- Date of birth: 1880
- Place of birth: Falkirk, Scotland
- Date of death: 1965 (aged 84–85)
- Place of death: Falkirk, Scotland
- Position: Goalkeeper

Youth career
- Woodbine Rovers

Senior career*
Years	Team	Apps	(Gls)
- Vale of Carron
1899–1901	East Stirlingshire	8	(0)
1900	→ Camelon (loan)		
1901–1904	Falkirk	38	(0)
1904–1905	Rangers	8	(0)
1905–1906	Albion Rovers	17	(0)
1906–1908	Falkirk	64	(0)
1908–1916	Hibernian	239	(0)
1916–1921	Falkirk	42	(0)
1918–1919	→ Clackmannan (loan)		
1921	Stenhousemuir	1	(0)
Total		417	(0)
- * Club domestic league appearances and goals

William Roberts Allan (1880 – 1965) was a Scottish footballer who played as a goalkeeper. He had three spells at hometown club Falkirk (after also starting out locally with East Stirlingshire) and spent six seasons with Hibernian, featuring on the losing side in the 1914 Scottish Cup Final (lost to Celtic after a replay. He also had spells with Rangers and Albion Rovers, and made a final Scottish Football League appearance (in a total of more than 400) for Stenhousemuir in an emergency, aged 41. The closest he came to international recognition was a trial for the Scottish League XI in 1910 during his time at Hibs.
