= Ally Scott =

Scottish footballer

Personal information
- Full name: Alistair Scott
- Date of birth: 26 August 1950 (age 76)
- Place of birth: Glasgow, Scotland
- Position: Striker

Senior career*
Years	Team	Apps	(Gls)
1972–1973	Queen's Park	33	(11)
1973–1976	Rangers	35	(9)
1976–1978	Hibernian	38	(4)
1978–1981	Morton	58	(6)
1981	Partick Thistle	2	(0)
1981	Queen of the South	6	(1)
1981–1982	East Stirlingshire	3	(0)
Total		175	(31)
- * Club domestic league appearances and goals

Ally Scott (born 26 August 1950, in Glasgow) is a Scottish former professional football player who is best known for his time with Rangers and Hibernian.

Scott began his career at Queen's Park before being signed by Rangers in 1973. He left Rangers three seasons later to join Hibernian. Afterwards, Scott had spells with Morton, Partick Thistle, Queen of the South, East Stirlingshire.
