= William Smith (Scottish footballer) =

Scottish footballer

Personal information
- Position: Outside left

Youth career
- Wishaw Hearts

Senior career*
Years	Team	Apps	(Gls)
1906–1908	Shettleston		
1908–1920	Hibernian	311	(52)

International career
1911–1914	Scottish League XI	3	(0)
- * Club domestic league appearances and goals

William Smith was a Scottish footballer who played for Hibernian as an outside left, although in the last few of the 12 seasons he spent at Easter Road, he was often used at left half after the emergence of Harry Ritchie. Smith played in the 1914 Scottish Cup Final which Hibs lost to Celtic after a replay, and was also selected three times for the Scottish League XI.
