= Willie Wilson (footballer, born 1941) =

Scottish footballer

Personal information
- Date of birth: 9 October 1941
- Place of birth: Wallyford, Scotland
- Date of death: 2001 (aged 59–60)
- Position: Goalkeeper

Youth career
- Musselburgh Windsor

Senior career*
Years	Team	Apps	(Gls)
1959–1969	Hibernian	116	(0)
1969–1973	Berwick Rangers	131	(0)
1974–1977	Cowdenbeath	52	(0)
Total		299	(0)
- * Club domestic league appearances and goals

Willie Wilson (9 October 1941 – November 2001) was a Scottish football goalkeeper who played in the Scottish Football League for Hibernian, Berwick Rangers and Cowdenbeath.

Wilson played in a number of European ties for Hibernian, including a famous 5–0 victory against Napoli.

He died in November 2001, following major heart surgery.
