= Patrick Callaghan =

Scottish footballer

Personal information
- Date of birth: August 12, 1879
- Date of death: February 26, 1959 (aged 79)
- Position: Inside left

Senior career*
Years	Team	Apps	(Gls)
1899–1914	Hibernian		

International career
1900	Scotland	1	(0)
1900–1903	Scottish Football League XI	2	(0)
- * Club domestic league appearances and goals

{{Infobox football biography

Patrick Callaghan (12 August 1879 – 26 February 1959) was a Scottish footballer who played for Hibernian and represented Scotland once. Callaghan, who played mainly as an inside left, was a "superb servant" of Hibernian, playing for the club for his whole career from debut in 1899 until his retirement in 1914.

Early in his time with the club, he won the Scottish Cup in 1902 and the league championship in 1903; Callaghan made 21 appearances and scored nine goals in the latter triumph.

Callaghan represented Scotland once, in a 1900 British Home Championship match against Ireland. He also played for the Scottish Football League XI twice (1900 and 1903).

== See also ==
- List of one-club men in association football
