= 1971 Drybrough Cup =

Tournament details
- Country: Scotland

Final positions
- Champions: Aberdeen
- Runners-up: Celtic

The 1971 Drybrough Cup was the first staging of Scotland's summer football competition. The competition was won by Aberdeen, who defeated Celtic 2–1 in the final.

== Quarter-finals ==
| Airdrieonians | 2–1 | Arbroath | 31 July 1971 |
| Celtic | 5–2 | Dumbarton | 31 July 1971 |
| East Fife | 0–3 | Aberdeen | 31 July 1971 |
| St Johnstone | 2–1 | Partick Thistle | 31 July 1971 |

== Semi-finals ==
| Home team | Result | Away team | Date |
|---|---|---|---|
| Airdrieonians | 1–4 | Aberdeen | 4 August 1971 |
| Celtic | 4–2 | St Johnstone | 4 August 1971 |

== Final ==
| Home team | Result | Away team | Date |
|---|---|---|---|
| Aberdeen | 2–1 | Celtic | 7 August 1971 |
