= 1913–14 Scottish Cup =

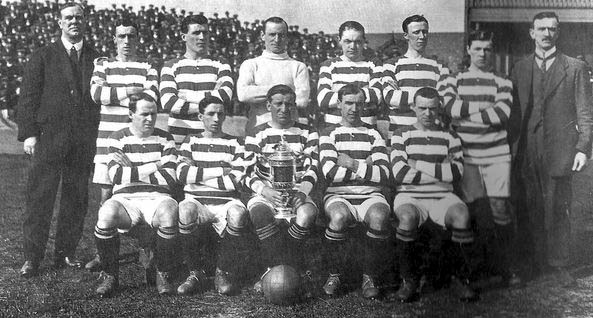
- 1914 Celtic team photo with the Scottish Cup trophy

Tournament details
- Country: Scotland

Final positions
- Champions: Celtic
- Runners-up: Hibernian

The 1913–14 Scottish Cup was the 41st staging of Scotland's most prestigious football knockout competition. The Cup was won by Celtic who defeated Hibernian in the replayed final.

== Fourth round ==
| Team One | Team Two | Score |
|---|---|---|
| Motherwell | Celtic | 1–3 |
| St Mirren | Partick Thistle | 1–0 |
| Queens Park | Hibernian | 1–3 |
| Third Lanark | Stevenston United | 1–1 0–0 1–0 |

== Semi-finals ==
28 March 1914

| Celtic | 2–0 | Third Lanark |

Ibrox, Glasgow
Attendance: 50,000

28 March 1914

| Hibernian | 3–1 | St Mirren |

Tynecastle, Edinburgh
Attendance: 30,000

== Final ==
11 April 1914

| Celtic | 0–0 | Hibernian |

Ibrox Park, Glasgow
Attendance: 56,000

=== Replay ===
16 April 1914

| Celtic | 4–1 | Hibernian |
|---|---|---|
| McColl; Browning | | Smith |

Ibrox Park, Glasgow
Attendance: 40,000

=== Teams ===
CELTIC :
| GK | (Scotland) Charlie Shaw |
| FB | (Scotland) Alec McNair |
| FB | (Scotland) Joe Dodds |
| RH | (Scotland) James Young |
| CH | (Scotland) Peter Johnstone |
| LH | (Scotland) John McMaster |
| OR | (Scotland) Andrew McAtee |
| IF | (Ireland) Patsy Gallacher |
| CF | (England) Ginger Owers |
| IF | (Scotland) Jimmy McMenemy |
| OL | (Scotland) John Browning |
| Replay: | Jimmy McColl replaced Owers. |
Manager:
(Scotland) Willie Maley

HIBERNIAN :
| GK | (Scotland) William Allan |
| FB | (Scotland) Neil Girdwood |
| FB | (Scotland) Bobby Templeton |
| RH | (Scotland) Peter Kerr |
| CH | (Scotland) Matt Paterson |
| LH | (Scotland) Sandy Grosert |
| OR | (United States) Bobby Wilson |
| IF | (Scotland) Samuel Fleming |
| CF | (Scotland) James Hendren |
| IF | (Scotland) James Wood |
| OL | (Scotland) William Smith |
| Replay: | Unchanged |
Manager:
(Ireland) Dan McMichael

== See also ==
- 1913–14 in Scottish football
