= Lindsay Muir =

Scottish footballer

Personal information
- Date of birth: 10 May 1956 (age 70)
- Place of birth: Linlithgow, Scotland
- Position: Defender

Senior career*
Years	Team	Apps	(Gls)
1975–1978	Hibernian	18	(1)
1978–1980	St Johnstone	63	(4)
1980–1987	Berwick Rangers	220	(2)
1987–1989	Cowdenbeath	38	(0)
1989–1990	Berwick Rangers	44	(0)

International career
1976	Scotland U21	1	(0)
- * Club domestic league appearances and goals

Lindsay Muir (born 10 May 1956) is a former professional footballer, who played for Hibernian, St Johnstone, Cowdenbeath and Berwick Rangers in the Scottish Football League.
