= Duncan Urquhart (footballer) =

Scottish footballer

Duncan Urquhart (18 August 1908 – 28 April 1956) was a Scottish footballer, who played for Hibernian, Aberdeen, Barrow, and Waterford. Urquhart represented Scotland once, in a 1934 British Home Championship match against Wales.

== Career ==
Urquhart, a "tough tackler" from Newton Stewart, was signed by Hibs during the 1929–30 season. Urquhart was part of the side as Hibs were relegated the following season, but then gained promotion back to the top flight in 1933. He won his only cap for Scotland later that year, but was released by Hibs in 1935 after a heavy Edinburgh derby defeat by Hearts; Urquhart then signed for Aberdeen. In September 1939 Urquhart was signed by Waterford and during his time there was also selected once for the League of Ireland XI.

== Personal life ==
In 1956, Urquhart died in Edinburgh, Scotland at the age of 47.
