= Jimmy O'Rourke (footballer) =

Scottish footballer (1946–2022)

Personal information
- Date of birth: 18 September 1946
- Place of birth: Edinburgh, Scotland
- Date of death: 15 November 2022 (aged 76)
- Place of death: Edinburgh, Scotland
- Height: 1.73 m (5 ft 8 in)
- Position: Striker

Senior career*
Years	Team	Apps	(Gls)
1962–1974	Hibernian	223	(81)
1974–1976	St Johnstone	68	(23)
1976–1978	Motherwell	46	(14)
Total		337	(118)
- * Club domestic league appearances and goals

Jimmy O'Rourke (18 September 1946 – 15 November 2022) was a Scottish footballer who played as a striker for Hibernian, St Johnstone and Motherwell.

O'Rourke signed for Hibernian straight from schools football in 1962. He made his first team debut as a 16-year-old later that year in an Inter-Cities Fairs Cup match against Utrecht. This made him the youngest player to play for Hibs in their history, a record that stood until January 2004, when Jamie McCluskey made his first team debut. O'Rourke then became a key player in Eddie Turnbull's side of the early 1970s that reached the 1972 Scottish Cup Final and won the League Cup Final later that year. He also scored two hat-tricks for Hibs in European matches, including one against Sporting CP.

O'Rourke was controversially transferred to St Johnstone in 1974 to make way for Joe Harper, who had been brought in from Everton at great expense. O'Rourke later played for Motherwell before returning to Easter Road as an assistant coach to Eddie Turnbull.

O'Rourke died at his home in Edinburgh on 15 November 2022, at the age of 76.
