= John Hazel (footballer) =

Scottish footballer (born 1952)

Personal information
- Date of birth: 30 November 1952 (age 73)
- Place of birth: Denny, Falkirk, Scotland
- Position: Midfielder

Senior career*
Years	Team	Apps	(Gls)
1970–1974	Hibernian	44	(3)
1973–1975	Greenock Morton	20	(6)
1977–1978	East Stirlingshire	1	(0)
1979–1980	Alloa Athletic	5	(0)
Total		70	(9)
- * Club domestic league appearances and goals

John Hazel (born 30 November 1952) is a Scottish former footballer, who played as a midfielder for Hibernian, Greenock Morton, East Stirlingshire, and Alloa Athletic during the 1970s. Hazel played for Hibs in the 1972 Scottish Cup Final, a 6–1 defeat by Celtic. He was born in Denny, Falkirk. Educated Stirling High School.
