= Alex Cropley =

English and Scottish footballer (1951–2026)

Personal information
- Full name: Alexander James Cropley
- Date of birth: 16 January 1951
- Place of birth: Aldershot, England
- Date of death: 27 March 2026 (aged 75)
- Height: 1.73 m (5 ft 8 in)
- Position: Midfielder

Senior career*
Years	Team	Apps	(Gls)
1968–1974	Hibernian	118	(27)
1974–1976	Arsenal	30	(5)
1976–1980	Aston Villa	67	(7)
1979–1980	→ Newcastle United (loan)	3	(0)
1981	Toronto Blizzard	15	(2)
1981–1982	Portsmouth	10	(2)
Total		228	(41)

International career
1971	Scotland	2	(0)
- * Club domestic league appearances and goals

Alexander James Cropley (16 January 1951 – 27 March 2026) was a professional footballer who played as a midfielder for Hibernian, Aston Villa, Arsenal, Newcastle United and Portsmouth. Born in England, he was capped for the Scotland national team.

== Career ==
Cropley was born in Aldershot, Hampshire. His father is Jack Cropley, who was playing for Aldershot at the time. Cropley junior, who grew up in Edinburgh, began his career with Hibernian, where he featured in the famed team of the early 1970s known as "Turnbull's Tornadoes". While with Hibs, he won the Scottish League Cup of 1972, in a 2–1 victory over Celtic in the final. Despite being born in the south of England, Cropley was eligible for Scotland and he was selected for matches played against Belgium and Portugal in 1971.

Late in 1974, Cropley moved to London where he turned down an offer from Chelsea to play for Arsenal, whom he signed for in a deal worth £150,000. He made his debut for the Gunners against Carlisle United on 7 December 1974. Cropley then broke his leg in a match away to Middlesbrough in January 1975 and broke it again soon after his comeback. He returned to make 22 appearances in the 1975–76 season, but could not secure a regular place in Arsenal's first team. He then linked up with Aston Villa in September 1976, having played 30 league games with five goals scored altogether for Arsenal.

At Villa, he featured in a memorable win against the great Liverpool side of the period. Cropley also appeared in the League Cup Final of 1977 against Everton. The final needed to be replayed after the game ended in a draw. The second final saw the two teams once again finish the game tied altogether. In the eventual third final, with the game going to extra time, Villa won by a 3–2 margin over the Toffees and in so doing Cropley victoriously lifted the Cup. He thereafter yet again suffered another a broken leg, in a game versus local rivals West Bromwich Albion on 10 December 1977. Cropley then had a spell on loan at Newcastle United from January to June 1980, returning to Villa in July of that year. Cropley left Villa Park in March 1981 to feature a month later for club Toronto Blizzard in the North American Soccer League. He then left Blizzard in October 1981 and to link up in the following month for Portsmouth. He then ended his days as a professional footballer in 1982 due to persistent and serious injuries at the relatively young age of 31.

== Personal life and death ==
After his playing days came to an end, Cropley became a taxi driver within his hometown of Edinburgh. His son Jordan is also a footballer, who played for Hibernian's academy. Jordan went on to feature for Scottish clubs Berwick Rangers, Arniston Rangers and Haddington Athletic.

An autobiography entitled Crops: The Alex Cropley Story was released in 2013.

Cropley was diagnosed with dementia in December 2020. He died on 27 March 2026, aged 75.

== Honours ==
Hibernian

- Scottish League Cup: 1972–73

Aston Villa

- Football League Cup: 1976–77

Individual

- Hibernian Hall of Fame: 2017

== See also ==
- List of Scotland international footballers born outside Scotland
