= 1971–72 in Scottish football =

Division One champions
- Celtic

Division Two champions
- Dumbarton

Scottish Cup winners
- Celtic

League Cup winners
- Partick Thistle

Junior Cup winners
- Cambuslang Rangers

Teams in Europe
- Aberdeen, Celtic, Dundee, Rangers, St Johnstone

Scotland national team
- 1972 BHC, UEFA Euro 1972 qualifying

The 1971–72 season was the 99th season of competitive football in Scotland and the 75th season of Scottish league football.

== Scottish League Division One ==
Pos	Team	Pld	W	D	L	GF	GA	GD	Pts	Qualification or relegation
1	Celtic	34	28	4	2	96	28	+68	60	Champion
2	Aberdeen	34	21	8	5	80	26	+54	50	
3	Rangers	34	21	2	11	71	38	+33	44	
4	Hibernian	34	19	6	9	62	34	+28	44	
5	Dundee	34	14	13	7	59	38	+21	41	
6	Heart of Midlothian	34	13	13	8	53	49	+4	39	
7	Partick Thistle	34	12	10	12	53	54	−1	34	
8	St Johnstone	34	12	8	14	52	58	−6	32	
9	Dundee United	34	12	7	15	55	70	−15	31	
10	Motherwell	34	11	7	16	49	69	−20	29	
11	Kilmarnock	34	11	6	17	49	64	−15	28	
12	Ayr United	34	9	10	15	40	58	−18	28	
13	Morton	34	10	7	17	46	52	−6	27	
14	Falkirk	34	10	7	17	44	60	−16	27	
15	Airdrieonians	34	7	12	15	44	76	−32	26	
16	East Fife	34	5	15	14	34	61	−27	25	
17	Clyde	34	7	10	17	33	66	−33	24	Relegated to 1972–73 Second Division
18	Dunfermline Athletic	34	7	9	18	31	50	−19	23	Relegated to 1972–73 Second Division

Source: Soccerbase and League Tables

Champions: Celtic
Relegated: Clyde, Dunfermline

== Scottish League Division Two ==
Pos	Team	Pld	W	D	L	GF	GA	GD	Pts	Promotion or relegation
1	Dumbarton	36	24	4	8	89	51	+38	52	Promotion to the 1972–73 First Division
2	Arbroath	36	22	8	6	71	41	+30	52	Promotion to the 1972–73 First Division
3	Stirling Albion	36	21	8	7	75	37	+38	50	
4	St Mirren	36	24	2	10	84	47	+37	50	
5	Cowdenbeath	36	19	10	7	69	28	+41	48	
6	Stranraer	36	18	8	10	70	62	+8	44	
7	Queen of the South	36	17	9	10	56	38	+18	43	
8	East Stirlingshire	36	17	7	12	60	58	+2	41	
9	Clydebank	36	14	11	11	60	52	+8	39	
10	Montrose	36	15	6	15	73	54	+19	36	
11	Raith Rovers	36	13	8	15	56	56	0	34	
12	Queen's Park	36	12	9	15	47	61	−14	33	
13	Berwick Rangers	36	14	4	18	53	50	+3	32	
14	Stenhousemuir	36	10	8	18	41	58	−17	28	
15	Brechin City	36	8	7	21	41	79	−38	23	
16	Alloa Athletic	36	9	4	23	41	75	−34	22	
17	Forfar Athletic	36	6	9	21	32	84	−52	21	
18	Albion Rovers	36	7	6	23	36	61	−25	20	
19	Hamilton Academical	36	4	8	24	31	93	−62	16	

Source: "1971-1972 Second Division - SPFL Archive". SPFL.

Promoted: Dumbarton, Arbroath

== Cup honours ==
Competition	Winner	Score	Runner-up
Scottish Cup 1971–72	Celtic	6 – 1	Hibernian
League Cup 1971–72	Partick Thistle	4 – 1	Celtic
Junior Cup	Cambuslang Rangers	3 – 2 (rep.)	Bonnyrigg Rose Athletic

== Other honours ==
=== National ===
Competition	Winner	Score	Runner-up
Scottish Qualifying Cup – North	Inverness Thistle	5 – 4 *	Ross County
Scottish Qualifying Cup – South	Vale of Leithen	4 – 0 *	Duns

=== County ===
Competition	Winner	Score	Runner-up
Aberdeenshire Cup	Peterhead		
Ayrshire Cup	Kilmarnock	3 – 1 *	Ayr United
Fife Cup	Raith Rovers	4 – 1 *	Dunfermline Athletic
Forfarshire Cup	Dundee United	4 – 0	Dundee
Renfrewshire Cup	Morton	7 – 0	Babcock & Wilcox
Stirlingshire Cup	Stirling Albion	5 – 1	Clydebank

^{*} – aggregate over two legs

=== Highland League ===
Top Three
Pos	Team	Pld	W	D	L	GF	GA	GD	Pts
1	Inverness Thistle	30	25	2	3	114	38	+76	52
2	Elgin City	30	25	1	4	99	32	+67	51
3	Inverness Caledonian	30	21	4	5	107	38	+69	46

== Individual honours ==
Award	Winner	Club
Footballer of the Year	(Scotland) Dave Smith	Rangers

== Scotland national team ==
Date	Venue	Opponents	Score	Competition	Scotland scorer(s)
13 October 1971	Hampden Park, Glasgow (H)	Portugal	2–1	ECQG5	John O'Hare, Archie Gemmill
10 November 1971	Pittodrie, Aberdeen (H)	Belgium	1–0	ECQG5	John O'Hare
1 December 1971	Olympisch Stadion, Amsterdam (A)	Netherlands	1–2	Friendly	George Graham
26 April 1972	Hampden Park, Glasgow (H)	Peru	2–0	Friendly	John O'Hare, Denis Law
20 May 1972	Hampden Park, Glasgow (H)	Northern Ireland	2–0	BHC	Denis Law, Peter Lorimer
24 May 1972	Hampden Park, Glasgow (H)	Wales	1–0	BHC	Peter Lorimer
27 May 1972	Hampden Park, Glasgow (H)	England	0–1	BHC	
29 June 1972	Estadio Minearo, Belo Horizonte (N)	Yugoslavia	2–2	BIC	Lou Macari (2)
2 July 1972	Estadio Biera Rio, Porto Alegre (N)	Czechoslovakia	0–0	BIC	
5 July 1972	Estadio do Maracana, Rio de Janeiro (A)	Brazil	0–1	BIC	

1972 British Home Championship – Joint winners with England

Key:

- (H) = Home match
- (A) = Away match
- ECQG5 = European Championship qualifying – Group 5
- BHC = British Home Championship
- BIC = Brazilian Independence Cup

== See also ==
- 1971–72 Rangers F.C. season
