= Iain Munro =

Scottish footballer and manager

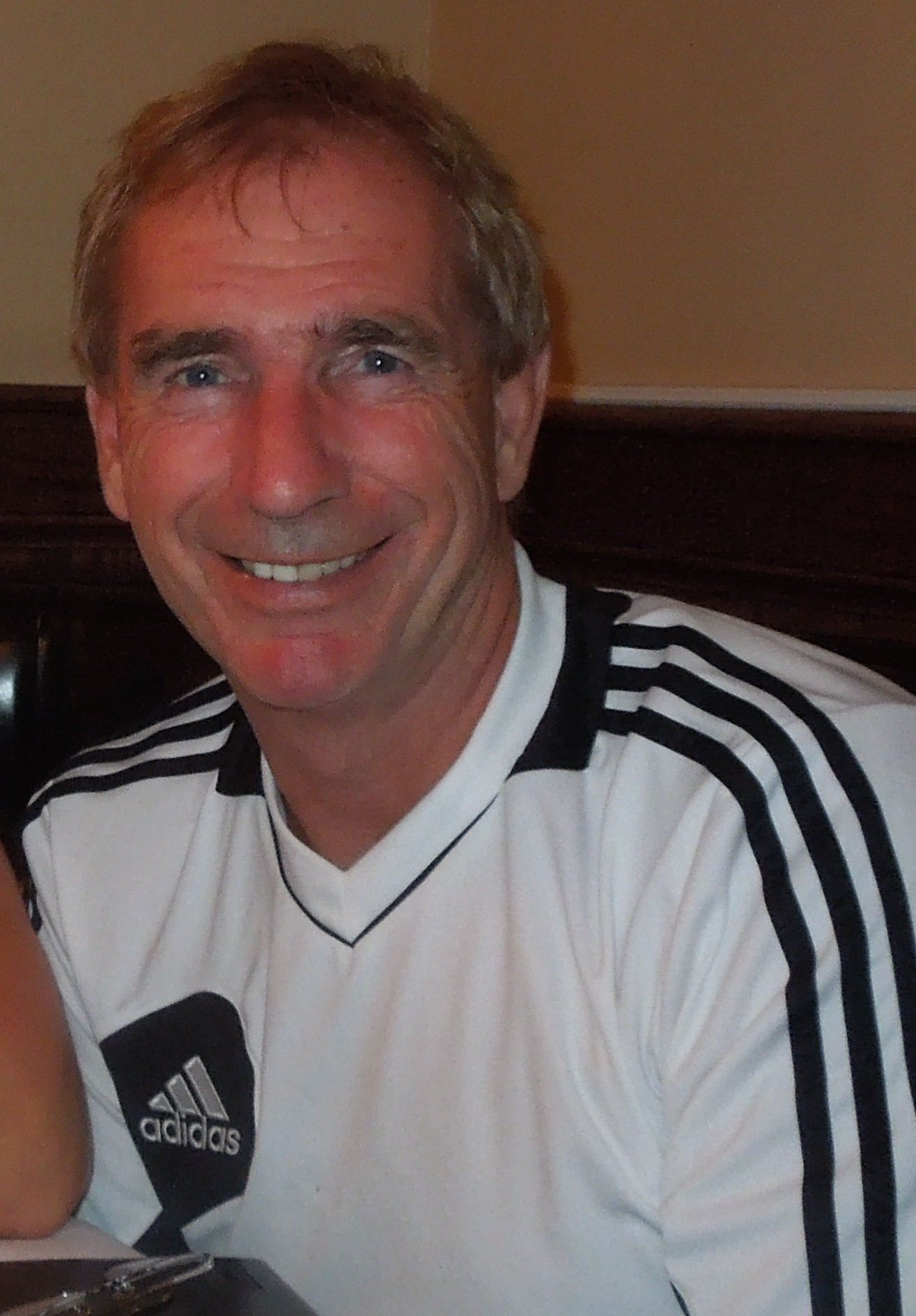

Personal information
- Full name: Alexander Iain Fordyce Munro
- Date of birth: 24 August 1951 (age 75)
- Place of birth: Viewpark, Scotland
- Positions: Midfielder; left back

Senior career*
Years	Team	Apps	(Gls)
1969–1973	St Mirren	105	(16)
1973–1976	Hibernian	61	(11)
1976–1977	Rangers	5	(0)
1977–1980	St Mirren	89	(3)
1980–1981	Stoke City	32	(1)
1981–1984	Sunderland	80	(0)
1984	Dundee United	14	(0)
1984–1986	Hibernian	33	(0)
Total		419	(31)

International career
1979–1980	Scotland	7	(0)
1980	Scottish Football League XI	1	(0)

Managerial career
- 1991: Dunfermline Athletic
- 1991–1992: Dundee
- 1992–1996: Hamilton Academical
- 1996: St Mirren
- 1996–1997: Raith Rovers
- * Club domestic league appearances and goals

Alexander Iain Fordyce Munro (born 24 August 1951) is a Scottish former professional football player and manager.

== Playing career ==
Munro was born in Uddingston and began his career at St Mirren making 103 league appearances for the Buddies in four years scoring 16 goals before moving to Hibernian in 1973. He spent three years at Hibs playing in 61 league matches and then joined Rangers for a short spell before making a return to Love Street. Munro spent three years back at St Mirren before moving south to Stoke City where he spent the 1980–81 season making 34 appearances scoring once which came in a 2–1 away victory at Southampton. In the summer of 1981 manager Alan Durban moved to Sunderland and he took Munro up to Roker Park with him. He spent three seasons at Sunderland making 88 appearances and later played with Dundee United and ended his career with a second spell at Hibernian.

== Coaching and management ==
Munro managed Dunfermline Athletic, Dundee, Hamilton Academical, Raith Rovers, and coached Ayr United. He also accepted an offer to be St Mirren manager in September 1996, but changed his mind after it became apparent that some of their directors wanted Tony Fitzpatrick to be the manager. His coaching qualifications include the UEFA Pro-licence and the SFA 'A' Licence. He is also a qualified physical education teacher. He has coached soccer in the United States with R.S.L. Florida.

He is currently YSC Director and Union Youth Director at YSC Sports in Wayne, Pennsylvania, United States, a youth soccer center which aims to provide high quality coaching for kids with an aim of developing skills in young players. YSC is the official youth development partner of the Philadelphia Union, a Major League Soccer club. Munro also does half-time television commentary for the Union's home games.

== Career statistics ==
=== Club ===
Appearances and goals by club, season and competition
Club	Season	League			FA Cup		League Cup		Other		Total	
Club	Season	Division	Apps	Goals	Apps	Goals	Apps	Goals	Apps	Goals	Apps	Goals
St Mirren	1969–70	Scottish Division One	5	0	0	0	0	0	0	0	5	0
St Mirren	1970–71	Scottish Division One	32	3	0	0	0	0	0	0	32	3
St Mirren	1971–72	Scottish Division Two	36	6	0	0	0	0	0	0	36	6
St Mirren	1972–73	Scottish Division Two	32	7	0	0	0	0	0	0	32	7
St Mirren	Total		105	16	0	0	0	0	0	0	105	16
Hibernian	1973–74	Scottish Division One	14	2	1	0	9	0	4	1	28	3
Hibernian	1974–75	Scottish Division One	30	8	1	0	3	1	5	2	39	11
Hibernian	1975–76	Scottish First Division	17	1	2	0	8	1	2	0	29	2
Hibernian	Total		61	11	4	0	20	2	11	3	96	16
Rangers	1975–76	Scottish First Division	0	0	0	0	0	0	1	0	1	0
Rangers	1976–77	Scottish First Division	5	0	0	0	6	1	0	0	11	1
Rangers	Total		5	0	0	0	6	1	1	0	12	1
St Mirren	1977–78	Scottish First Division	24	3	0	0	0	0	0	0	24	3
St Mirren	1978–79	Scottish First Division	33	0	0	0	0	0	0	0	33	0
St Mirren	1979–80	Scottish First Division	32	0	0	0	0	0	0	0	32	0
St Mirren	Total		89	3	0	0	0	0	0	0	89	3
Stoke City	1980–81	First Division	32	1	2	0	0	0	0	0	34	1
Sunderland	1981–82	First Division	34	0	0	0	3	0	0	0	37	0
Sunderland	1982–83	First Division	37	0	0	0	4	0	0	0	41	0
Sunderland	1983–84	First Division	9	0	1	0	0	0	0	0	10	0
Sunderland	Total		80	0	1	0	7	0	0	0	88	0
Dundee United	1983–84	Scottish First Division	9	0	0	0	0	0	0	0	9	0
Dundee United	1984–85	Scottish First Division	5	0	0	0	2	0	1	0	8	0
Dundee United	Total		14	0	0	0	2	0	1	0	17	0
Hibernian	1984–85	Scottish First Division	6	0	0	0	0	0	0	0	6	0
Hibernian	1985–86	Scottish First Division	27	0	4	0	5	0	0	0	36	0
Hibernian	1986–87	Scottish First Division	0	0	0	0	1	0	0	0	1	0
Hibernian	Total		33	0	4	0	6	0	0	0	44	0
Career total			419	31	11	0	41	3	13	3	484	37

=== International ===
National team	Year	Apps	Goals
Scotland	1979	5	0
Scotland	1980	2	0
Total		7	0
