= Alex Edwards (footballer) =

Scottish footballer (1946–2024)

Personal information
- Date of birth: 14 February 1946
- Place of birth: Dunfermline, Scotland
- Date of death: 11 December 2024 (aged 78)
- Position: Winger

Senior career*
Years	Team	Apps	(Gls)
1961–1971	Dunfermline Athletic	240	(43)
1971–1978	Hibernian	142	(5)
1978–1980	Arbroath	9	(0)
Total		391	(48)

International career
1964	SFL trial v SFA	1	(0)
1966	Scotland U23	1	(1)
- * Club domestic league appearances and goals

Alex Edwards (14 February 1946 – 11 December 2024) was a Scottish footballer who played as a winger for Dunfermline, Hibernian and Arbroath.

Jock Stein gave Edwards his league debut just five days after his 16th birthday in March 1962, which made him the second-youngest outfield player (after Andy Penman of Dundee) to play in a Scottish Football League match. He then featured as a 16-year-old in Dunfermline's famous 6–2 home victory against Valencia in 1962. He went on to play for Dunfermline in the Scottish Cup finals of 1965 and 1968, winning the latter.

Hibernian manager Eddie Turnbull signed Edwards for £13,000 in 1971. He combined well on the right side of the Hibs side with John Brownlie. He played in another Scottish Cup Final in 1972, before winning the Scottish League Cup in the following season. Hibs challenged for the league title that season as well, but fell away after Edwards was banned for eight weeks having been booked four times.

Edwards moved on to Arbroath in 1978, before retiring from professional football in 1980.

In October 2024, he was inducted into the Hibernian Hall of Fame. Edwards died aged 78 on 11 December 2024.
