= Bobby Smith (footballer, born 1953) =

Scottish footballer

Personal information
- Full name: Robert Nisbet Smith
- Date of birth: 21 December 1953
- Place of birth: Dalkeith, Scotland
- Date of death: 22 February 2010 (aged 56)
- Place of death: Edinburgh, Scotland
- Height: 5 ft 7 in (1.70 m)
- Positions: Left back; midfielder

Youth career
- Musselburgh Windsor

Senior career*
Years	Team	Apps	(Gls)
1972–1978	Hibernian	152	(19)
1978–1986	Leicester City	181	(21)
1982	→ Peterborough United (loan)	5	(0)
1982	→ Hibernian (loan)	5	(0)
1986–1987	Hibernian	10	(0)
1987–1989	Dunfermline Athletic	66	(1)
1989–1990	Partick Thistle	30	(1)
1990–1991	Berwick Rangers	26	(0)
Total		475	(42)
- * Club domestic league appearances and goals

Robert Nisbet Smith (21 December 1953 – 22 February 2010) was a Scottish footballer who played most prominently for Hibernian and Leicester City. Smith was primarily a midfielder, but could also play at full back. Smith made 200 appearances in all competitions for both Hibs and Leicester.

Smith started his professional career with Hibs, where he played a part in the successful teams of the early and mid-1970s. Smith attracted the attention of Rangers manager Jock Wallace by scoring a spectacular goal for Hibs against Rangers in a 1976 match. Wallace became Leicester City manager in 1978, and signed Smith for an £85,000 transfer fee later that year. Smith helped Leicester win promotion to the top division twice during his spell with the club. He regularly captained Leicester during his eight years there.

He was loaned to Peterborough and Hibs during the 1982–83 season, and then returned to Hibs on a "permanent" basis in 1986. After leaving Hibs for the final time in 1987, Smith played a prominent defensive role for a Dunfermline side that gained promotion to the Premier Division, but was released at the end of that season.

After ending his career with spells at Partick Thistle and Berwick Rangers, Smith became a taxi driver, and later ran a pub in Dalkeith called Smith's Bar. He died in February 2010 after suffering from cancer, less than a week after former teammate Alan Gordon died from the same illness.
