= Alan Gordon (Scottish footballer) =

Scottish footballer

Personal information
- Full name: Alan Fordyce Gordon
- Date of birth: 14 May 1944
- Place of birth: Edinburgh, Scotland
- Date of death: 18 February 2010 (aged 65)
- Height: 6 ft 0 in (1.83 m)
- Position: Striker

Youth career
- 1959–1961: Edinburgh Athletic

Senior career*
| Years | Team | Apps | (Gls) |
| 1961–1967 | Heart of Midlothian | 112 | (49) |
| 1967–1968 | Durban United | 19 | (10) |
| 1968–1969 | Heart of Midlothian | 15 | (6) |
| 1969–1972 | Dundee United | 77 | (34) |
| 1972–1974 | Hibernian | 84 | (51) |
| 1974–1976 | Dundee | 36 | (8) |
| Total | | 324 | (128) |
- * Club domestic league appearances and goals

Alan Gordon (14 May 1944 – 18 February 2010) was a Scottish football player who is notable for playing for the two senior sides of both Edinburgh and Dundee, and is thought to be the only player to do so.

== Life and career ==
=== School and youth level ===
Though Edinburgh born, the earliest account of young Alan's precocious footballing talent recalls a blonde eight-year-old scoring freely for Sunnybank Primary School in Aberdeen. The family sojourn in the North East was brief, however, and back home in Edinburgh, he thrived as part of the Murrayburn Primary School which had won The School Board Cup in 1954, 1955 and 1956 and four other trophies in those three seasons. He was selected to play for Edinburgh Primary Schools and would go on to captain the team that beat Bellshill Primary Schools 3–0 in the second leg of the Scottish Cup Final for the Wilson Trophy at Tynecastle, winning 4–2 on aggregate. Gordon scored once in a match which was played on 14 May 1956, his twelfth birthday. Naturally left footed, he was by now confirmed in the inside left position.

Despite winning a scholarship to the rugby union-playing George Heriot's School, and trying rugby for one season, Gordon continued to nurture his footballing prowess. Initially, for two seasons, he turned out for his local Boys Brigade 43rd Company team and then, for a single season, for Sighthill Thistle who finished second in the Lothian Amateur Under 18 League. The following season, Alan was playing for the Scottish Juvenile (Under 18) side, Edinburgh Athletic. With his awareness in the box, lethal left foot and uncanny heading ability he proved a perfect foil for the mesmeric wing play and crossing of teammate, Willie Henderson and he scored 120 goals in 80 games over two seasons. In the 1959/60 season Edinburgh Athletic won the prestigious Lord Weir Cup at New Meadowbank, beating league rivals Edina Hearts 4–1 in the final with both Gordon and Henderson on target. By the time Henderson had completed his final appearance before moving to Rangers, Gordon had scored twice and Athletic had trounced Edina Hearts again, this time 9–1 in the Insurance Cup final at Saughton Enclosure. The consolation goal for Edina near the end of the game that day was scored by John Greig, who also signed for Rangers that summer. Gordon had already signed a provisional contract with Hearts in early September 1959 at the age of 15 and, henceforth, would train twice a week at Tynecastle.

=== Hearts ===
Having scored 13 goals in eight games for the reserves, Alan made his first team debut at Hearts, whilst still a pupil at Heriots, in a 1st Division match on 21 October 1961 against reigning League champions Celtic at Tynecastle . He was now 17 and his opposite man that day was the redoubtable Scotland international "right half", Pat Crerand. In only his second match, he played in the 1961 Scottish League Cup Final against Rangers at Hampden in front of 88,000 fans . He was fouled for the penalty from which John Cumming equalised for Hearts but the game finished a draw and he did not play in the replay, which Hearts lost. Gordon scored his first goal in senior football on his fourth appearance in an away league match against Raith Rovers and it proved the winner. He scored again in the next game at home against Motherwell but Hearts lost 6–2. In that maiden season he made 22 league appearances scoring 5 goals, including a double in a 4–1 victory against Hibs at Easter Road, with a further hat-trick coming in a Scottish Cup tie against Vale of Leithen. The highlight for the schoolboy may have been turning out on several occasions alongside Hearts' idolised forward, Willie Bauld and the friendships he struck up with other teammates such as Danny Ferguson and Billy Higgins.

Gordon continued his studies after leaving Heriot's and gained a Master of Arts degree in economics from the University of Edinburgh, where he also studied Moral Philosophy and Spanish Literature. By the 1964–65 season he had developed into a first team regular, scoring 23 times as the Maroons narrowly missed out on the League title.

=== Dundee United ===
Following a spell in South Africa in 1967 and 1968, where he played for Durban United and worked as a company representative for Beare Brothers, Gordon left Tynecastle permanently in 1969 when Jerry Kerr paid £8,000 to take him to Dundee United. While with the Tannadice club he remained Edinburgh-based as he was now studying towards his professional Chartered Accountancy qualification, training twice a week with the Terrors. When Jim McLean was appointed manager a policy requiring all United players to live in Tayside was instigated, however, Gordon refused.

=== Hibernian ===
Eddie Turnbull paid £12,000 to take Gordon back to Edinburgh, but this time with Hibernian. It was with the Easter Road side that he enjoyed his career highlights. In 1972–73 he helped Hibs to victory in the League Cup and Drybrough Cup, while the following season they retained the Drybrough Cup. He also featured in one of the most celebrated matches in Hibs' history, the 7–0 victory over rivals Hearts in the 1 January 1973 derby, a match in which he scored the second and seventh goals.

=== Dundee ===
Despite this success, Gordon was sold to Dundee for £13,000 in 1974, earning the unique distinction of having represented both of Dundee and Edinburgh's senior sides. His spell with the Dark Blues was less successful, however. Following their last-day relegation in 1976, due to a goal difference inferior to his former side United, Gordon retired from football aged 32.

=== After football ===
After ending his playing career, Gordon continued to work in the accountancy profession, with his clients including Irvine Welsh. During the 1980s, he co-presented the "Sportsbeat" programme on Radio Forth. He also appeared regularly on Scotsport with Arthur Montford and continued to work as a football reporter on both radio and television. In addition, following the election of Archie McPherson as Rector, by dint of being a graduate of that establishment, he was asked to undertake a three-year period of office as Rector's Assessor at the University of Edinburgh. Gordon died on 18 February 2010, from a brain tumour, having suffered a recurrence of the cancer which had initially prompted the removal of part of his tongue eight years earlier and which curtailed his media involvement.
