= Des Bremner =

Scottish footballer

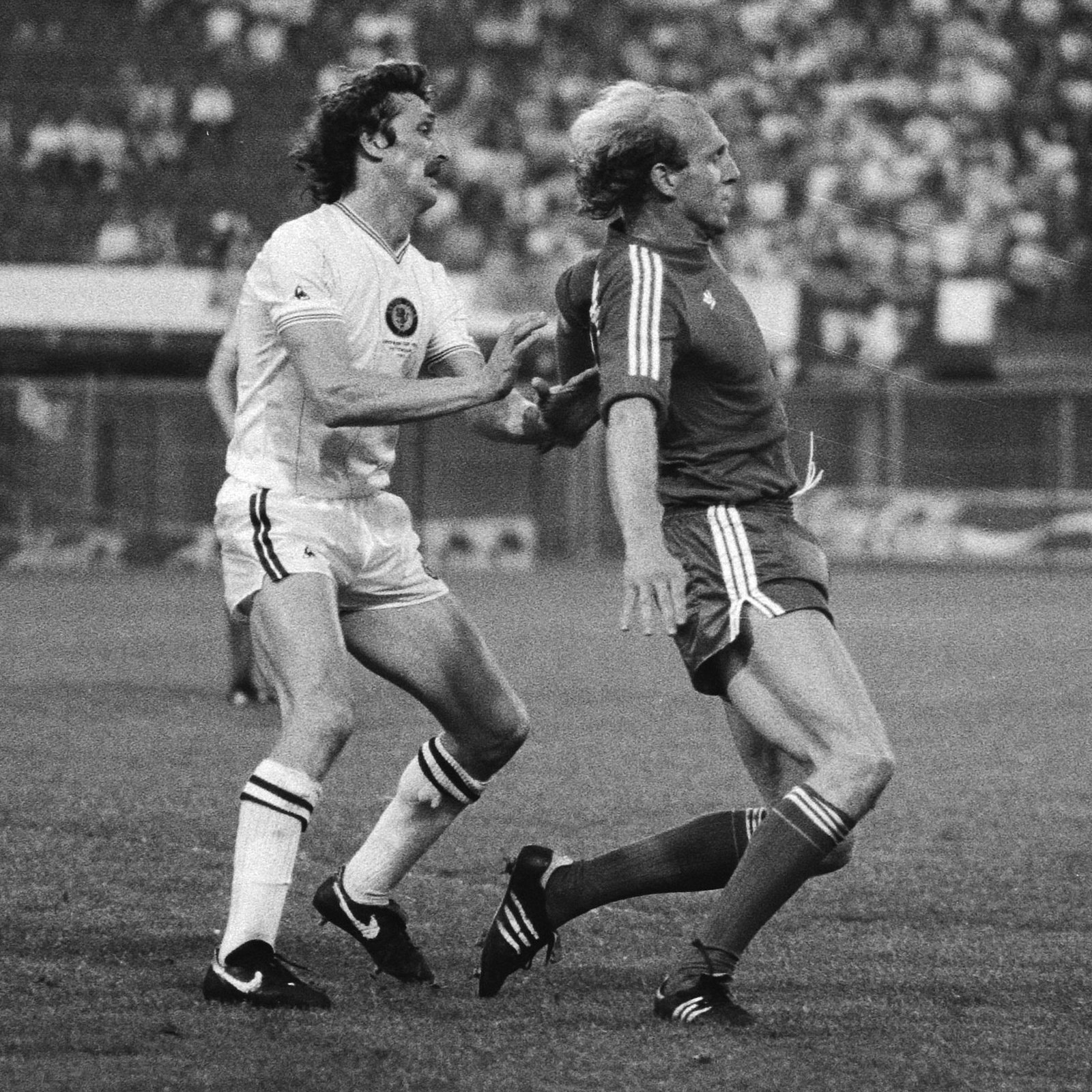
- Bremner (left) playing for Aston Villa in the 1982 European Cup final with Dieter Hoeneß

Personal information
- Full name: Desmond George Bremner
- Date of birth: 7 September 1952 (age 74)
- Place of birth: Aberchirder, Banffshire, Scotland
- Height: 5 ft 10 in (1.78 m)
- Position: Midfielder

Youth career
- Deveronvale
- 1971–1972: Hibernian

Senior career*
Years	Team	Apps	(Gls)
1972–1979	Hibernian	199	(18)
1979–1984	Aston Villa	174	(9)
1984–1989	Birmingham City	168	(5)
1989–1990	Fulham	16	(0)
1990	Walsall	6	(0)
1990–1992	Stafford Rangers	40	(0)
1994	Sutton Town		
Total		602	(32)

International career
1974–1976	Scotland U23	9	(2)
1976	Scottish Football League XI	1	(0)
1976	Scotland	1	(0)
- * Club domestic league appearances and goals

Desmond George Bremner (born 7 September 1952) is a Scottish former professional football midfielder. He made more than 600 league appearances for clubs in both Scotland and England, was a member of Aston Villa's European Cup-winning team of 1982, and was capped for the Scotland national team.

== Career ==
Born in Aberchirder, Banffshire, Bremner began his football career with Banff-based Highland League club Deveronvale before joining Hibernian in 1971, turning professional in November 1972. He made his only appearance for Scotland while with Hibs in March 1976, coming on as a substitute for Kenny Dalglish in the game against Switzerland.

He moved to Aston Villa in 1979 for a fee of £275,000 and quickly settled as a regular in the side. In his second season with the club he was an ever-present as they took the Football League title, their first for 71 years. The following season Bremner was a member of Villa's European Cup-winning side.

He left the club in September 1984, rejoining his former Villa manager Ron Saunders, who by then was managing local rivals Birmingham City. He helped Birmingham to promotion back to the First Division, but the team were relegated back to the Second Division after one season, and a further relegation, to the Third Division, followed in 1988–89 before Bremner moved to Fulham on a free transfer in August 1989. He joined Walsall in March 1990 on non-contract terms and subsequently played for Stafford Rangers before retiring in 1991.

After retiring as a player he worked for the Professional Footballers' Association, subsequently becoming the managing director of the financial division of the organisation.

His brother Kevin was also a professional footballer.

== Honours ==
Hibernian

- Scottish Cup runner-up: 1978–79
- Scottish League Cup runner-up: 1974–75

Aston Villa

- Football League First Division: 1980–81
- FA Charity Shield: 1981 (shared)
- European Cup: 1981–82
- European Super Cup: 1982
- Intercontinental Cup runner-up: 1982

Birmingham City

- Second Division runner-up: 1984–85
