= Arthur Duncan (footballer, born 1947) =

Scottish footballer

Personal information
- Date of birth: 5 December 1947 (age 78)
- Place of birth: Falkirk, Scotland
- Position: Left winger

Senior career*
Years	Team	Apps	(Gls)
1965–1969	Partick Thistle	118	(29)
1969–1984	Hibernian	446	(73)
1984–1987	Meadowbank Thistle	34	(0)
Total		598	(102)

International career
1967–1976	Scottish League XI	4	(0)
1975	Scotland	6	(0)
- * Club domestic league appearances and goals

Arthur Duncan (born 5 December 1947) is a Scottish former footballer, who was capped six times by Scotland and formerly held the record for the most number of league appearances for Hibernian.

Duncan played for Hibernian from 1969 until 1984. Originally under manager Willie Macfarlane, he then featured in the teams of the 1970s managed by Eddie Turnbull, which were known as Turnbull's Tornadoes. This team won the Scottish League Cup in 1972 and finished second in the league in 1974 and 1975, which was Hibs' greatest period of sustained success since the Famous Five team of the early 1950s. A highlight of Duncan's time at Hibs was when he scored twice in the club's 7–0 victory at the home of Edinburgh derby rivals Hearts on 1 January 1973.

Towards the end of this period, Duncan won international recognition, making his Scotland debut against Portugal on 13 May 1975. Duncan featured in the three Home Internationals that season, including the infamous 5–1 defeat by England at Wembley. Duncan won the last of his six caps later that year against Denmark. Coincidentally, this was the game that was marred by an incident afterwards where five players (Billy Bremner, Willie Young, Joe Harper, Pat McCluskey and Arthur Graham) were allegedly ejected from a nightclub in Copenhagen. Those players were banned from playing for Scotland, initially for life, but the bans were eventually commuted.

Duncan continued to play for Hibs as the club's fortunes declined in the late 1970s and early 1980s. The club did reach the 1979 Scottish Cup Final, but Duncan's own goal during extra time in the second replay proved to be the winning goal for Rangers. Duncan is highly regarded amongst the Hibs support for his long service and the memorable moments he helped to provide. Duncan left Hibernian in 1984 and signed for Meadowbank Thistle, where he retired after the 1986–87 season. He then worked as a physiotherapist for Meadowbank, and continued in this role after Meadowbank Thistle moved to Livingston (becoming Livingston FC). He later emigrated to New Zealand.

== See also ==
- List of footballers in Scotland by number of league appearances (500+)
