= Drybrough Cup =

- Founded: 1971
- Folded: 1980
- Country: Scotland
- Number of clubs: 8
- Most championships: Hibernian; Aberdeen (2 times)

The Drybrough Cup was a Scottish annual football tournament. It was held from 1971 until 1974, and was revived from 1979 to 1980. It was open to the four highest-scoring teams from Division 1, and the four highest-scoring teams from Division 2. The format allowed the tournament to have three rounds: first round, semi-final and final. The tournament was held in the week preceding the commencement of the league season.

The tournament was conceived because the Scottish Football Association would not permit existing competitions to have a title sponsor. The Drybrough brewery got around this regulation by inventing a new competition bearing their name.

In the 1972, 1973 and 1974 Drybrough Cups, an experimental version of the offside law was operated. In the 1979 final, Davie Cooper scored what is regarded by many Rangers fans as one of the best goals ever scored in an Old Firm match.

== Finals summaries ==
Year	Crowd	Match		
Year	Crowd	Winner	Score	Runner-up
1971–72	25,000	Aberdeen	2–1	Celtic
1972–73	49,462	Hibernian	5–3 (aet)	Celtic
1973–74	49,204	Hibernian	1–0 (aet)	Celtic
1974–75	57,558	Celtic	2–2 (4–2p)	Rangers
1979–80	40,609	Rangers	3–1	Celtic
1980–81	6,994	Aberdeen	2–1	St Mirren
