= John Brownlie =

Scottish footballer and manager (born 1952)

Personal information
- Full name: John Brownlie
- Date of birth: 11 March 1952 (age 74)
- Place of birth: Caldercruix, Scotland
- Position: Defender

Youth career
- Pumpherston Juniors

Senior career*
Years	Team	Apps	(Gls)
1970–1978	Hibernian	211	(14)
1978–1982	Newcastle United	124	(2)
1982–1984	Middlesbrough	12	(0)
1984–1985	Hartlepool United	19	(1)
1985–1986	Berwick Rangers	15	(0)
1986–1987	Blyth Spartans	0	(0)
Total		381	(17)

International career
1971–1975	Scotland	7	(0)
1972	Scottish League XI	1	(0)
1972–1976	Scotland under-23	5	(0)

Managerial career
- 1988–1992: Cowdenbeath
- 1994: Meadowbank Thistle
- 1997–1998: East Stirlingshire
- 2000–2003: Arbroath
- 2019: Berwick Rangers
- 2020-2022: East Stirlingshire(Assistant Manager)
- * Club domestic league appearances and goals

John Brownlie (born 11 March 1952) is a Scottish former football player and coach, currently assistant manager of East Stirlingshire.

Brownlie played as a right back for Pumpherston Juniors, Hibernian, Newcastle United, Middlesbrough, Hartlepool United, Berwick Rangers, Blyth Spartans and the Scotland national team. Brownlie later managed Cowdenbeath, Meadowbank Thistle, East Stirlingshire, Arbroath and Berwick Rangers.

== Playing career ==
Brownlie joined Hibernian from Pumpherston Juniors in 1969 and remained at Easter Road for nine years. He was part of the 1972 League Cup winning team and also earned runners-up medals in 1972 (Scottish Cup) and 1974 (League Cup).

He later played for Newcastle United, Middlesbrough, Hartlepool United, Berwick Rangers and Blyth Spartans. Following his retirement in 1986, he ran a hotel in the English North-East.

== Coaching career ==
In 1988 Brownlie gained his first managerial appointment at Cowdenbeath and won promotion from the Scottish Second Division before his departure in 1992.

He subsequently joined Clyde, where he worked as assistant manager under Alex Smith. Just after Christmas in 1993, Brownlie was offered the chance to succeed Donald Park as Meadowbank Thistle manager. He signed a two-year deal but resigned after managing only five matches, having achieved a promotion at work which involved working on Saturdays.

Brownlie later managed East Stirlingshire from 1997 until 1998.

After a spell running the youth teams at Raith Rovers, Brownlie managed Arbroath between 2000 and 2003 where he led the club to promotion from the Scottish Second Division and kept them in the Scottish First Division for two seasons.

He later returned to East Stirlingshire as a coach, taking temporary charge of the first team in 2008 after the resignation of Gordon Wylde.

Brownlie was appointed manager of Berwick Rangers in May 2019 ahead of a relegation play-off, which they lost to Cove Rangers. He was replaced by Ian Little as Berwick manager after they were relegated to the Lowland League.

Brownlie rejoined East Stirlingshire as a coach in July 2020, and later stepped up to become assistant manager of the club after Andy Rodgers left on 4 January 2021.

== Personal life ==
His son Paul was also a professional footballer.

== Career statistics ==
Appearances and goals by national team and year
National team	Year	Apps	Goals
Scotland	1971	1	0
Scotland	1972	5	0
Scotland	1973	—	
Scotland	1974	—	
Scotland	1975	1	0
Total		7	0

== Managerial record ==
As of 18 May 2019

Team	From	To	Record				
Team	From	To	G	W	D	L	Win %
Cowdenbeath	1988	1992					
Meadowbank Thistle	1993	1994	5	1	3	1	20.00
East Stirlingshire	1997	1998					
Arbroath	September 2000	October 2003	127	33	34	60	25.98
Berwick Rangers	May 2019	May 2019	3	0	0	3	0.00
Total			130	33	34	63	25.38

- Arbroath statistics come from soccerbase website.
- Cowdenbeath and East Stirlingshire statistics not currently available.

== Honours ==
=== Player ===
Hibernian

- Scottish League Cup: 1972–73

=== Manager ===
Cowdenbeath

- Scottish Second Division promotion: 1991–92

Arbroath

- Scottish Second Division promotion: 2000–01
