= John Blackley =

Scottish footballer and coach (born 1948)

Personal information
- Full name: John Henderson Blackley
- Date of birth: 12 May 1948 (age 78)
- Place of birth: Westquarter, Scotland
- Position: Defender

Youth career
- Gairdoch Juveniles

Senior career*
Years	Team	Apps	(Gls)
1967–1977	Hibernian	263	(6)
1977–1979	Newcastle United	46	(0)
1979–1981	Preston North End	53	(0)
1981–1983	Hamilton Academical	38	(0)
1983–1984	Hibernian	16	(0)
Total		416	(6)

International career
1972	Scottish League XI	1	(0)
1973–1977	Scotland	7	(0)

Managerial career
- 1982–1983: Hamilton Academical
- 1984–1986: Hibernian
- 1987–1988: Cowdenbeath
- 1991: Dundee
- * Club domestic league appearances and goals

John Henderson Blackley (born 12 May 1948) is a Scottish football coach and former player.

Blackley made 279 appearances at centre-half for Hibernian and also represented Newcastle United, Preston North End and Hamilton Academical. He won seven Scottish international caps and represented his country in the 1974 FIFA World Cup, playing in the 2–0 win against Zaire.

Blackley began a managerial career with Hamilton in October 1981, while continuing his playing career. He left Hamilton in 1983 and became a player/coach at Hibs, his first senior club, and was then promoted to the manager's position at Easter Road in 1984. His final managerial role was at Cowdenbeath, which he left to become Gordon Wallace's assistant at Dundee.

Blackley has since worked at several clubs with Paul Sturrock, including St Johnstone, Dundee United, Plymouth Argyle twice, Sheffield Wednesday and Swindon Town. His brief has been to work specifically with the defenders, passing on the experience he accrued in his 17-year playing career. Blackley was part of a successful coaching trio alongside Paul Sturrock and Kevin Summerfield that saw them achieve four promotions in six seasons. Blackley and Summerfield left Plymouth in October 2009 after being advised their contracts, which were due to expire at the end of the 2009–10 season, were not going to be renewed.

In 2011, Blackley was assistant manager of Stirling Albion, working alongside Jocky Scott. He left the club in December 2011.
