= Eddie Turnbull =

Scottish footballer and manager (1923–2011)

Personal information
- Full name: Edward Hunter Turnbull
- Date of birth: 12 April 1923
- Place of birth: Carronshore, Falkirk, Scotland
- Date of death: 30 April 2011 (aged 88)
- Position: Forward

Senior career*
Years	Team	Apps	(Gls)
1946–1959	Hibernian	349	(150)

International career
1948–1958	Scotland	9	(0)
1949–1958	Scottish League XI	4	(0)

Managerial career
- 1963–1965: Queen's Park
- 1965–1971: Aberdeen
- 1967: → Washington Whips (USA)
- 1971–1980: Hibernian
- * Club domestic league appearances and goals

Edward Hunter Turnbull (12 April 1923 – 30 April 2011) was a Scottish professional football player and manager. He played as a forward for Hibernian and Scotland, forming part of the Hibs "Famous Five" forward line. He then had successful spells as manager of Aberdeen and Hibs, winning a major trophy with each club.

== Early life ==
Turnbull was in the Royal Navy during the Second World War, serving aboard HMS Bulldog, HMS Alnwick Castle and HMS Plover. In November 2015, he was posthumously awarded an Arctic Star military campaign medal.

== Playing career ==
Making his professional debut at the age of 23 when the war ended, during the late 1940s and 1950s he was one of the Famous Five, the noted Hibernian forward line, along with Gordon Smith, Bobby Johnstone, Lawrie Reilly, and Willie Ormond. During his time with Hibernian they won three Scottish Football League titles, and in 1955 he was the first British player to score in a European club competition.

Although Turnbull was selected nine times to play for Scotland and played in the 1958 FIFA World Cup, he did not physically receive an international cap at the time. This was because he did not play in any Home International matches, and caps were only awarded for playing in those matches until the mid-1970s. This situation was rectified in 2006 as a result of Gary Imlach's successful campaign for his father Stewart Imlach and other players affected by this rule to receive recognition.

== Coaching career ==
He was manager of Aberdeen between 1965 and 1971 winning the 1969–70 Scottish Cup and finishing second in the league in 1970–71. After that he returned to Hibernian, winning the 1972–73 Scottish League Cup. He also managed their 7–0 win over their Edinburgh derby rivals Heart of Midlothian on 1 January 1973.

Turnbull died on 30 April 2011, aged 88. Hibernian chairman Rod Petrie stated that no-one had made a greater contribution to the club than Turnbull.

== Playing statistics ==
Appearances and goals by national team and year
National team	Year	Apps	Goals
Scotland
Scotland	1948	3	0
Scotland	1950	1	0
Scotland	1958	5	0
Total		9	0

== Managerial statistics ==
Team	From	To	Record				
Team	From	To	G	W	D	L	Win %
Queen's Park	1963	1965	104	44	19	41	42.31
Aberdeen	1965	1971	315	150	66	99	47.62
Hibernian	1971	1980	454	219	110	125	48.24
Total			873	413	195	265	47.31

== Honours ==
=== Player ===
Hibernian

- Scottish League: 1947–48, 1950–51, 1951–52

=== Manager ===
Aberdeen

- Scottish Cup: 1969–70

Hibernian

- Scottish League Cup: 1971–72
- Drybrough Cup: 1972, 1973

== See also ==
- List of one-club men
