= John Walker =

John Walker may refer to:

== Politicians ==
=== American politicians ===
- John Walker (Arkansas politician) (1937–2019), member of the Arkansas House of Representatives
- John Walker (Missouri politician) (1770–1838), State Treasurer of Missouri
- John Walker (Virginia politician) (1744–1809), U.S. Senator, public official, and soldier
  - SS John Walker, a Liberty ship
- John A. Walker (Iowa politician) (1912–2012)
- John M. Walker Jr. (born 1940), former chief judge of the U.S. Court of Appeals for the Second Circuit
- John M. Walker (Pennsylvania politician) (1905–1976), Pennsylvania state senator and lieutenant-gubernatorial nominee
- John R. Walker (1874–1942), U.S. representative from Georgia
- John Williams Walker (1783–1823), U.S. senator from Alabama

=== Other politicians ===
- John Walker (Australian politician) (1799–1874), member of the Tasmanian Legislative Council
- John Walker (Canadian politician) (1832–1889), industrialist & Canadian House of Commons member
- John Archibald Walker (1890–1977), Canadian lawyer and political figure in Nova Scotia
- John Smith Walker (1826–1893), minister of finance of the Kingdom of Hawaii

== Sportsmen ==
=== Association football ===
- John Walker (footballer, born 1873) (1873–1937), Scottish international footballer (Hearts, Liverpool, Rangers)
- John Walker (footballer, born 1876) (1876–1900), Scottish footballer (Leith Athletic, Hearts, Lincoln City)
- John Walker (footballer, born 1899) (1899–1971), English footballer (Walsall, Stoke)
- John Walker (footballer, born 1902), Scottish footballer (Hibernian, Swindon Town)
- John Walker (footballer, born 1866) (1866–1921), Scottish footballer (Burnley)
- John Walker (Grimsby Town footballer), Scottish football centre-half (Grimsby Town)
- Jock Walker (1882–1968), Scottish footballer (Raith Rovers, Beith, Rangers, Swindon Town, Middlesbrough, Reading, Scotland)

=== Cricket ===
- John Walker (cricketer, born 1768) (1768–1835), cricketer (brother of Tom and Harry Walker)
- John Walker (cricketer, born 1826) (1826–1885), cricketer and the eldest brother of the Walkers of Southgate
- John Walker (cricketer, born 1854) (1854–?), English cricketer
- John Walker (Scottish cricketer) (1879–1953)

=== Other sports ===
- John Walker (American football, born 1983), former defensive back for the USC football team
- John Walker (American football, born 1961), American football defensive tackle
- John Walker (archer) (born 1974), British archer
- John Walker (Australian footballer) (born 1951), Australian rules footballer for Collingwood
- John Walker (cyclist) (1888–1954), British Olympic cyclist
- John Walker (gymnast) (1883–1966), British Olympic gymnast
- John Walker (rowing) (1891–1952), British coxswain and Olympic medalist
- John Walker or Mr. Wrestling II (1934–2020), masked professional wrestler
- John Walker (rugby league), footballer of the 1960s
- Sir John Walker (runner) (born 1952), New Zealand runner, Olympic Gold medalist in 1500 metres run in 1976
- John R. Walker (horse trainer), Canadian Horse Racing Hall of Fame horse trainer
- John Reid Walker (1855–1934), British polo player and racehorse breeder

== Entertainers and artists ==
- John Walker (animator), television animator and director
- John Walker (Australian actor) (fl. 1990s), Australian comedic actor
- John Walker (curator) (1906–1995), director of the National Gallery of Art
- John Walker (film producer) (born 1956), animated film producer
- John Walker (filmmaker) (born 1952), Canadian filmmaker and cinematographer
- John Walker (musician) (1943–2011), born John Maus, member of the 1960s singing group The Walker Brothers
- John Walker (organist) (born 1941), recording artist
- John Walker (painter) (born 1939), nominee for the Turner Prize in 1985
- John Augustus Walker (1901–1967), Alabama Gulf Coast artist
- John Edward Walker, British-born, American painter and educator
- John Henry Walker (1831–1899), Canadian engraver and illustrator

== Military personnel and spies ==
- John Walker (RAF officer) (1936–2025), British Chief of Defence Intelligence
- John Walker (Medal of Honor) (c. 1845–?), American Indian Wars soldier and Medal of Honor recipient
- John William Ernest Walker (1919–1942), Australian staff sergeant who was executed in the Ration Truck massacre
- John Walker (officer of arms) (1913–1984), English officer of arms
- John Anthony Walker (1937–2014), American communications specialist convicted in 1985 of spying for the Soviet Union
- John C. Walker, Indiana physician and officer during the American Civil War
- John George Walker (1821–1893), general in the Confederate States Army during the American Civil War
- John Grimes Walker (1835–1907), US Navy admiral
- John T. Walker (USMC) (1893–1955), US Marine Corps general

== Inventors and scientists ==
- John Walker (inventor) (1781–1859), English chemist and inventor of the friction match in 1827
- John Walker (natural historian) (1731–1803), Scottish naturalist
- John Walker (programmer) (born c. 1950–2024), one of the designers of AutoCAD
- John Charles Walker (1893–1994), American agricultural scientist
- John E. Walker (born 1941), British chemist, winner of the 1997 Nobel Prize
- John Francis Walker (1839–1907), British geologist
- John James Walker (1825–1900), British mathematician
- John M. Walker (1907–1990), American physician and investment banker
- John Walker (horticulturist) (1893–1991), Canadian plant breeder

== Businessmen ==
- John Walker (grocer) (1805–1857), Scottish founder of John Walker & Sons and namesake of the Johnnie Walker whisky brand
- John Walker (Scottish cricketer) (1879–1953), Scottish businessman and director of John Walker & Sons
- John Brisben Walker (1847–1931), American entrepreneur and magazine publisher
- John Hardeman Walker (1794–1860), southeast Missouri landowner

== Clergymen ==
- John Walker (archdeacon of Essex) (died 1588), Anglican archdeacon
- John Walker (archdeacon of Dorset) (1694–1780)
- John Walker (biographer) (1674–1747), English clergyman and ecclesiastical historian
- John Walker (scholar) (1692–1741), English classical scholar and Anglican archdeacon of Hereford
- John Walker (1769–1833), Church of Ireland cleric and academic who seceded as founder of a sect
- John M. Walker (bishop) (1888–1951), Episcopal bishop of Atlanta
- John Russell Walker (1837–1887), Anglican priest
- John T. Walker (bishop) (1925–1989), American Episcopal bishop of Washington
- John Walker (abolitionist) (1786–1845), Presbyterian minister in Ohio and Pennsylvania
- John Walker (Presbyterian minister) (1855–1941) in Australia

== Others ==
- John Walker (industrialist) (1884–1932), Pittsburgh industrialist
- John Walker (journalist) (born 1977), British video game journalist
- John Walker (lexicographer) (1732–1807), English lexicographer, actor and philologist
- John Walker (philatelist) (1855–1927), British philatelist
- John Walker (numismatist) (1900–1964), Scottish numismatist
- John Walker (vaccinator) (1759–1830), English educational writer, physician, and advocate of vaccination
- John Walker (antiquary) (1770–1831), English antiquary
- John Brian Walker (1924–2014), British general practitioner
- John Walker, one of the Birmingham Six accused of bombings in England in 1974
- John A. Walker (art critic) (1938–2023), British art critic and historian
- John Clay Walker (1948–1985), American journalist
- John H. Walker (1872–1955), Scottish-born American labor unionist and politician
- John Walker (diplomat), British diplomat
- John Walker (Protector of Aborigines), South Australian Protector of Aborigines, 1861–1868

== Fictional characters ==
- John Walker, in Arthur Ransome's Swallows and Amazons series of novels
- John Walker, alter ego of U.S. Agent, a comic book superhero

== See also ==
- John Walker Lindh (born 1981), American captured as an enemy combatant in 2001, in Afghanistan, usually referred to by the press as John Walker
- Johnnie Walker (disambiguation)
- Jack Walker (disambiguation)
- Jon Walker (born 1985), American musician
- Jonathan Walker (disambiguation)
