= List of Clyde F.C. managers =

This is a list compiling the former managers of Clyde Football Club.

The team achieved its highest league placing in the top division, which was third-place, in three separate seasons and under three different managers; Walter Jack in 1908–09 (three points behind champions Celtic), Alex Maley in 1911–12 (nine points behind champions Rangers), and Davie White in 1966–67 (twelve points behind champions Celtc).

Alex Maley led the team to its first national cup final in the club's history, the Scottish Cup final in 1910. Later on Joe Miller led the club to its first national cup final in 48 years, the Scottish Challenge Cup final in 2006.

Paddy Travers is the club's most successful manager with two Scottish Cup final wins in 1939 (4–0 v Motherwell) and 1955 (1–0 v Celtic after a replay), losing a third final in between in 1949 (1–4 v Rangers). His four Scottish Cup final appearances (including the 1937 defeat with Aberdeen) led him to being named one of Scottish football's 50 greatest managers by the Scottish Herald. He also led to the club to four trophies in the one season in 1951–52.

Two former Clyde managers have also gone on to become the Scotland national team manager, John Prentice, who went directly from being Clyde to Scotland manager in 1966, and Craig Brown who left Clyde in 1986 to become Scotland national under-21 team manager and assistant manager to Andy Roxburgh for the full team, later replacing him as Scotland manager in 1993.

== Managers ==
Name	Nat	From	To	Notes	Ref
–––				Division Two Champions 1904–05; Division Two Runners-up 1903–04; Graham Cup Winners 1888, 1889, 1890, 1891; North Eastern Cup Winners 1891, 1893, 1894, 1895; Glasgow and West of Scotland League Winners 1905	(Note: There was no promotion for any Scottish Division Two club in 1903–04.) (Note: No promotion in 1904–05 as division winners because Falkirk (runners-up) and Aberdeen (seventh-place) were elected into Scottish Division One instead for the 1905–06 season.)
Walter Jack	Scotland	July 1905	May 1909	Joint-Highest top division finish: Third Place 1908–09; Division Two Runners-up 1905–06; Glasgow and West of Scotland Shield Winners 1907	(Note: Walter Jack was possibly the club's first managerial appointment.) (Note: The club were elected for promotion from Scottish Division Two as runners-up along with Hamilon Academical (fourth place) in 1905–06.)
Alex Maley	Scotland	1909	1912	Scottish Cup Runners-up 1909–10 and 1911–12; Joint-Highest top division finish: Third Place 1911–12; Glasgow Charity Cup Winners 1910	
John James Commins	Scotland	May 1912	November 1922	Glasgow Cup Winners 1915; Scottish Second XI Cup Winners 1914–15	(Note: Commins' forename is actually John. His name is sometimes given as Jamie or Jimmy Commins.) (Note: According to The Sunday Post the position of manager was vacant by 4 November 1922.) (Note: The Scottish Second XI Cup was for reserve teams of member clubs of the Scottish 2nd FA XI.)
Frank Thompson	Ireland	11 November 1922	19 January 1935	Division Two Runners-up 1925–26; Glasgow Cup Winners 1926	
Russell Moreland	Scotland	2 February 1935	23 October 1937		
Paddy Travers	Scotland	27 November 1937	19 July 1956	Scottish Cup Winners 1938–39 and 1954–55; Scottish Cup Runners-up 1948–49; Division Two Champions 1951–52; Supplementary Cup Winners 1951–52; Southern League Runners-up 1940–41; Summer Cup Runners-up 1943–44; Glasgow Cup Winners 1947, 1952; Glasgow Charity Cup Winners 1940, 1952; Paisley Charity Cup Winners 1939, 1940	
Johnny Haddow	Scotland	19 July 1956	24 November 1962	Scottish Cup Winners 1957–58; Division Two Champions 1956–57 and 1961–62; Glasgow Cup Winners 1959; Glasgow Charity Cup Winners 1958, 1961	
John Prentice	Scotland	17 December 1962	24 March 1966	Division Two Runners-up 1963–64	
Davie White	Scotland	31 March 1966	10 July 1967	Joint-Highest top division finish: Third Place 1966–67	
Archie Wright	Scotland	1967	15 December 1967		
Archie Robertson	Scotland	January 1968	29 August 1973	Division Two Champions 1972–73	
Stan Anderson	Scotland	31 August 1973	29 March 1977		
Billy McNeill	Scotland	1 April 1977	June 1977		
Craig Brown	Scotland	July 1977	1986	Second Division Champions 1977–78 and 1981–82	
John Clark	Scotland	30 July 1986	1992		
Alex Smith	Scotland	1992	9 September 1996	Second Division Champions 1992–93	
Gardner Speirs	Scotland	12 September 1996	7 July 1998		
Ronnie McDonald		7 July 1998	February 2002		(Note: Ronnie McDonald served as general manager.)
Allan Maitland	Scotland	1998	7 February 2002	Second Division Champions 1999–2000; Keyline Cup Winners 1999, 2000, 2001	(Note: Allan Maitland served as first team coach.)
Alan Kernaghan	Ireland	1 March 2002	16 June 2004	First Division Runners-up 2002–03 and 2003–04; SPFA First Division Manager of the Year: 2002–03	(Note: There was no promotion for team that finished runners-up from second tier in Scottish football via automatic or the play-offs between 2000–01 and 2012–13 excluding Dundee in 2011–12 because of Rangers liquidation.)
Billy Reid	Scotland	8 July 2004	27 April 2005		(Note: Billy Reid was temporarily caretaker manager in 2002, between the departure of Allan Maitland and the appointment of Alan Kernaghan.)
Graham Roberts	England	19 May 2005	22 August 2006	Tommy McGrane Cup Winners 2006	
Joe Miller	Scotland	22 August 2006	25 May 2007	Challenge Cup Runners-up 2006–07	(Note: He was player / assistant manager to Graham Roberts while he was manager, before being given the job when Roberts was sacked.)
Colin Hendry	Scotland	11 June 2007	18 January 2008		
John Brown	Scotland	26 January 2008	21 November 2009	First Division Play-off Winners 2007–08	
John McCormack	Scotland	30 November 2009	5 April 2010		
Stuart Millar	Scotland	27 April 2010	1 February 2011		
Jim Duffy	Scotland	7 February 2011	19 May 2014		
Barry Ferguson	Scotland	13 June 2014	26 February 2017	League One Play-off Runners-up 2015–16	
Jim Chapman	Scotland	20 May 2017	31 October 2017		
Danny Lennon	Scotland	13 November 2017	25 October 2022	League One Play-off Winners 2018–19; Broadwood Cup Winners 2020; SPFL League Two Manager of the Season: 2018–19	
Jim Duffy	Scotland	7 November 2022	24 May 2023		
Brian McLean	Scotland	2 June 2023	22 October 2023		

== Caretaker managers ==
Name	Nat	From	To	Ref
Jim Rowan	Scotland			(Note: Jim Rowan was caretaker manager between Archie Robertson's and Stan Anderson's spells as Clyde managers.)
Mike Clinton	Scotland	24 September 1976	31 December 1976	(Note: Mike Clinton was caretaker while manager Stan Anderson was ill.)
Bobby Waddell		1 January 1977	31 March 1977	(Note: Bobby Waddell was caretaker manager while manager Stan Anderson was ill.)
Billy Reid	Scotland			(Note: Billy Reid was caretaker manager between Allan Maitland's and Alan Kernaghan's spells as Clyde managers.)
Stuart Balmer; Gary Bollan	Scotland; Scotland			(Note: Stuart Balmer and Gary Bollan were caretaker managers between Billy Reid;s and Graham Roberts's spells as Clyde managers.)
Dougie Bell	Scotland			(Note: Dougie Bell was caretaker manager between Colin Hendry's and John Brown's spells as Clyde managers.)
Neil Watt	Scotland			(Note: Neil Watt was caretaker manager between John McCormack's and Stuart Millar's spells as Clyde managers.)
Neil Watt; Gordon Wylde	Scotland; Scotland			(Note: Neil Watt and Gordon Wylde were caretaker managers between Stuart Millar's and Jim Duffy's spells as Clyde managers.)
Bob Malcolm	Scotland	26 February 2017	Feb / Mar 2017	(Note: Bob Malcolm left his role after one match.)
Jon-Paul McGovern; Peter MacDonald	Scotland; Scotland	2 March 2017	May 2017	
Tony McNally	Scotland	2 November 2017	13 November 2017	(Note: Caretaker manager between Jim Chapman's and Danny Lennon's spells as Clyde managers.)
Allan Moore	Scotland	25 October 2022	7 November 2022	(Note: Caretaker manager between Danny Lennon's tenure and Jim Duffy's second spell as Clyde manager.)
Chris Millar	Scotland	22 October 2023	15 November 2023	(Note: Caretaker from Brian McLean's departure until the appointment of Ian McCall.)
