= Stanley Anderson (disambiguation) =

Stanley Anderson (1939–2018) was an American actor.

Stanley Anderson or Stan Anderson may also refer to:

- Stanley Anderson (artist) (1884–1966), British engraver, etcher and watercolour painter
- Stanley Thomas Anderson (born 1953), U.S. federal judge
- Stan Anderson (1933–2018), English footballer
- Stan Anderson (Australian footballer) (1893–1953), Australian rules footballer
- Stan Anderson (rugby union) (1871–1942), English rugby union player
- Stan Anderson (Scottish footballer) (1939–1997), Scottish football player and manager
- Uell Stanley Andersen (1917–1986), also known as Stanley Anderson, American football player and shot putter
- Stan Anderson (shot putter) (born 1917), American shot putter and discus thrower, 3-time All-American for the Stanford Cardinal track and field team
