= Sheila Vaz =

Indian actress and dancer (1934–2022)

- Born: 18 October 1934; Dadar, Mumbai, India
- Died: 29 June 2022 (aged 87); Mumbai, India
- Other name: Rama Lakhanpal
- Occupations: Actor, dancer
- Years active: 1951–1961

Sheila Vaz (18 October 1934 – 29 June 2022) was an Indian actress and dancer who appeared in Hindi Cinema in the 1950s. She is best remembered for her dance performances, most notably in the songs "Ramaiya Vastavaiya" from Shree 420 (1955) and "Leke Pehla Pehla Pyar" from C.I.D. (1956).

Often described by fans as a "song specialist", Vaz's work is described as a bridge between the folk traditions and urban Bollywood choreography. She primarily appeared in song sequences, and worked with directors such as Raj Kapoor, Guru Dutt, and Raj Khosla. After a decade-long career spanning over 50 films, she retired in 1961 to lead a private life.

== Early life ==
Vaz was born in Dadar, Mumbai, to a Catholic family with roots in Goa. During her childhood, the film industry was often viewed with social skepticism; her family initially forbade her from pursuing a career in cinema. However, she eventually secured her parents' permission and made her debut as a background dancer in Kidar Sharma's Shokhiyan (1951).

== Major projects ==
=== Shree 420 (1955): "Ramaiya Vastavaiya" ===
In Raj Kapoor's Shree 420, Vaz played a village girl in the song, "Ramaiya Vastavaiya". Vaz lip-synced to the singer, Lata Mangeshkar in this song. Despite not speaking Hindi fluently at the time, Vaz studied the lyrical translation to ensure her expressions matched the emotional weight of the song. Vaz's performance was praised for its "immense stamina" and became a symbol of working-class resilience.

=== C.I.D. (1956): "Leke Pehla Pehla Pyar" ===
Vaz's performance in the song "Leke Pehla Pehla Pyar" from C.I.D. is frequently cited as a representative dance sequence of 1950s cinema. The sequence was choreographed by Zohra Sehgal. It was filmed on location at Worli Sea Face in Mumbai. Vaz reportedly learned the intricate steps in just one day. Appearing alongside Shakila and a harmonium-playing Shyam Kapoor (an assistant director playing a bit part), Vaz lip-synced to singer Shamshad Begum. According to film historian Madhulika Liddle, Vaz's performance was noted for its 'teasing' expressions, which stood out even against the film's lead stars.

== Career expansion and legacy ==
Beyond her major hits, Vaz was a versatile performer who worked across genres:

- Acting Roles: In the film Johny Walker (1957), she played the character "Glory", a loyal roommate to the heroine

She also performed in the debut song of composer R. D. Burman, "Ghar Aaja Gher Aaye", in the film Chhote Nawab (1961).

=== Legacy ===
Vaz is often remembered by fans for her "unabashedly expressive" style and is frequently cited in modern film studies for her body positivity. In an era before strict "size-zero" standards, Vaz was celebrated as an "undeniably beautiful" plus-size dancer whose energy outperformed her peers.

== Personal life and death ==
Vaz retired in 1961 following her marriage to director Ramesh Lakhanpal. Adopting the name Rama Lakhanpal, she lived a quiet life in Mumbai. She faced personal tragedy during the 2005 Maharashtra floods, which destroyed her entire collection of film costumes and memorabilia.

She died in Mumbai on 29 June 2022 due to age-related complications. She has two children; her son is a pilot in the United States and her daughter resides in Toronto.

== Filmography ==
Year	Film	Role	Notable Song
1951	Shokhiyan	Chorus Dancer	Debut film
1954	Mayur Pankh	Dancer	"Tandana Tandana"
1955	Shree 420	Dancer	"Ramaiya Vastavaiya"
1955	House No. 44	Dancer	"Dam Hai Baaki"
1956	C.I.D.	Dancer	"Leke Pehla Pehla Pyar"
1957	Tumsa Nahin Dekha	Seema	"Jawaniyan Yeh Mast Mast"
1957	Johny Walker	Glory	"Thandi Thandi Hawa"
1958	Solva Saal	Dancer	
1959	Kaagaz Ke Phool	Dancer	
1961	Chhote Nawab	Dancer	"Ghar Aaja Gher Aaye"
