= 1923–24 Scottish Cup =

Tournament details
- Country: Scotland

Final positions
- Champions: Airdrieonians
- Runners-up: Hibernian

The 1923–24 Scottish Cup was the 46th staging of Scotland's most prestigious football knockout competition. The Cup was won by Airdrieonians, who defeated Hibernian 2–0 in the final.

== Fourth round ==
Team One	Team Two	Score
Airdrieonians	Ayr United	1-1 0-0 1-0
Hearts	Falkirk	1-2
Aberdeen	St Bernards	3-0
Hibernian	Kilmarnock	2-2 1-1 2-1

== Semi-finals ==
22 March 1924

Aberdeen	0–0	Hibernian

Dens Park, Dundee
Attendance: 19,000

22 March 1924

Airdrieonians	2–1	Falkirk

Celtic Park, Glasgow
Attendance: 30,000

=== Replay ===
26 March 1924

Hibernian	0–0 (a.e.t.)	Aberdeen

Dens Park, Dundee
Attendance: 14,000

=== Second Replay ===
9 April 1924

Hibernian	1–0	Aberdeen

Dens Park, Dundee
Attendance: 12,000

== Final ==
The 1924 Scottish Cup Final was a one sided game with Airdrie rarely in trouble. Bob Bennie at left half dictated much of the play. Airdrie's Bob McPhail said, "Hughie Gallacher caused havoc with the Hibs defenders. He and Russell were easily our best forwards." Russell scored both goals.

=== Match summary ===
19 April 1924

Airdrieonians	2–0	Hibernian
Russell 4', 37'

Ibrox Park, Glasgow
Attendance: 59,218
Referee: T. Dougray

Airdrie:
GK	(Scotland) Jock Ewart
RB	(Scotland) Alex Dick
LB	(Scotland) George McQueen
RH	(Scotland) Tom Preston
CH	(Scotland) Jock McDougall
LH	(Scotland) Bob Bennie
OR	(Scotland) James Reid
IR	(Scotland) Willie Russell
CF	(Scotland) Hughie Gallacher
IL	(Scotland) Bob McPhail
OL	(Scotland) Jimmy Somerville
Manager:
(Scotland) Willie Orr

Hibernian:
GK	(Scotland) Bill Harper
RB	(Scotland) William McGinnigle
LB	(Scotland) William Dornan
RH	(Scotland) Peter Kerr
CH	(Scotland) William Miller
LH	(Scotland) Hugh Shaw
OR	(Scotland) Harry Ritchie
IR	(Scotland) Jimmy Dunn
CF	(Scotland) Jimmy McColl
IL	(Scotland) Johnny Halligan
OL	(Scotland) John Walker
Manager:
(Scotland) Alex Maley

== See also ==
- 1923–24 in Scottish football
