= John Walker (footballer, born 1902) =

Scottish footballer

Personal information
- Date of birth: 1 February 1902
- Place of birth: Dalmuir, Scotland
- Position: Outside left

Senior career*
Years	Team	Apps	(Gls)
- Yoker Athletic
- Kirkintilloch Rob Roy
1920–1927	Hibernian	195	(41)
1927–1929	Swindon Town	20	(4)
1929–1930	Ebbw Vale		
1930–1931	Bath City		
- * Club domestic league appearances and goals

John Walker (born 1 February 1902) was a Scottish footballer who played for Yoker Athletic, Kirkintilloch Rob Roy, Hibernian, Swindon Town, Ebbw Vale and Bath City. His position was outside left.

== Career ==
Born in Dalmuir (now part of Clydebank), Walker began his playing career with local Junior team Yoker Athletic, moving on Kirkintilloch Rob Roy in the same system. He may have been a provisional signing for Rangers but did not play a competitive match for the Glasgow club before he was signed by Hibernian in November 1920.

He would spend the next seven years at Easter Road, during which the Hibees built a strong team (mostly brought in by manager Davy Gordon but improved by his successor Alex Maley). He joined the club around the same time as Jimmy Dunn and Johnny Halligan, two other emerging forwards from the Glasgow area, and all three – along with the experienced Jimmy McColl – became important attacking elements of the team which played in two Scottish Cup finals in 1923 (lost to Celtic) and 1924 (defeated by Airdrieonians). He was given the nickname "darkie" due to his black hair. (Note: The name possibly also referenced a local player of the same name who played in the same position and had the same nickname owing to his Afro-Caribbean ethnicity, who had played for Hibs' rivals Leith Athletic and Hearts 20 years earlier.)

After making 218 appearances for Hibernian in major competitions (46 goals), Walker was allowed to leave the club on a free transfer in summer 1927, joining Swindon Town of the English Football League Third Division South for two seasons, where he was not a regular starter. He then had spells in the Southern Football League with Ebbw Vale and Bath City before retiring.

The closest he came to any representative honours was an appearance in a Scottish Football League XI trial in 1925.
