= Jack Walker (disambiguation) =

Jack Walker (1929–2000) was a British industrialist and investor in Blackburn Rovers football club.

Jack Walker may also refer to:

- Jack Walker (baseball), Negro league baseball player
- Jack Walker (cricketer) (1914–1968), English cricketer
- Jack Walker (ice hockey) (1888–1950), Canadian ice hockey forward
- Jack Walker (Coronation Street), a fictional character in the British soap opera Coronation Street
- Jack Walker (association footballer) (1882–1960), English footballer
- Jack Walker (rugby league) (born 1999), English rugby league footballer
- Jack Walker (rugby union) (born 1996), English rugby union player
- Jack Walker (Australian footballer, born 1892) (1892–1916), Australian rules footballer who played with St Kilda
- Jack Walker (Australian footballer, born 1910) (1910–1982), Australian rules footballer who played with Geelong
- Jack Walker (athlete), English pole vaulter
- Jack D. Walker (1922–2005), Lieutenant Governor of Kansas
- Jack E. Walker (1910–1979), American politician

== See also ==
- John Walker (disambiguation)
