= The Military Museums =

Museum in Calgary, Alberta, Canada

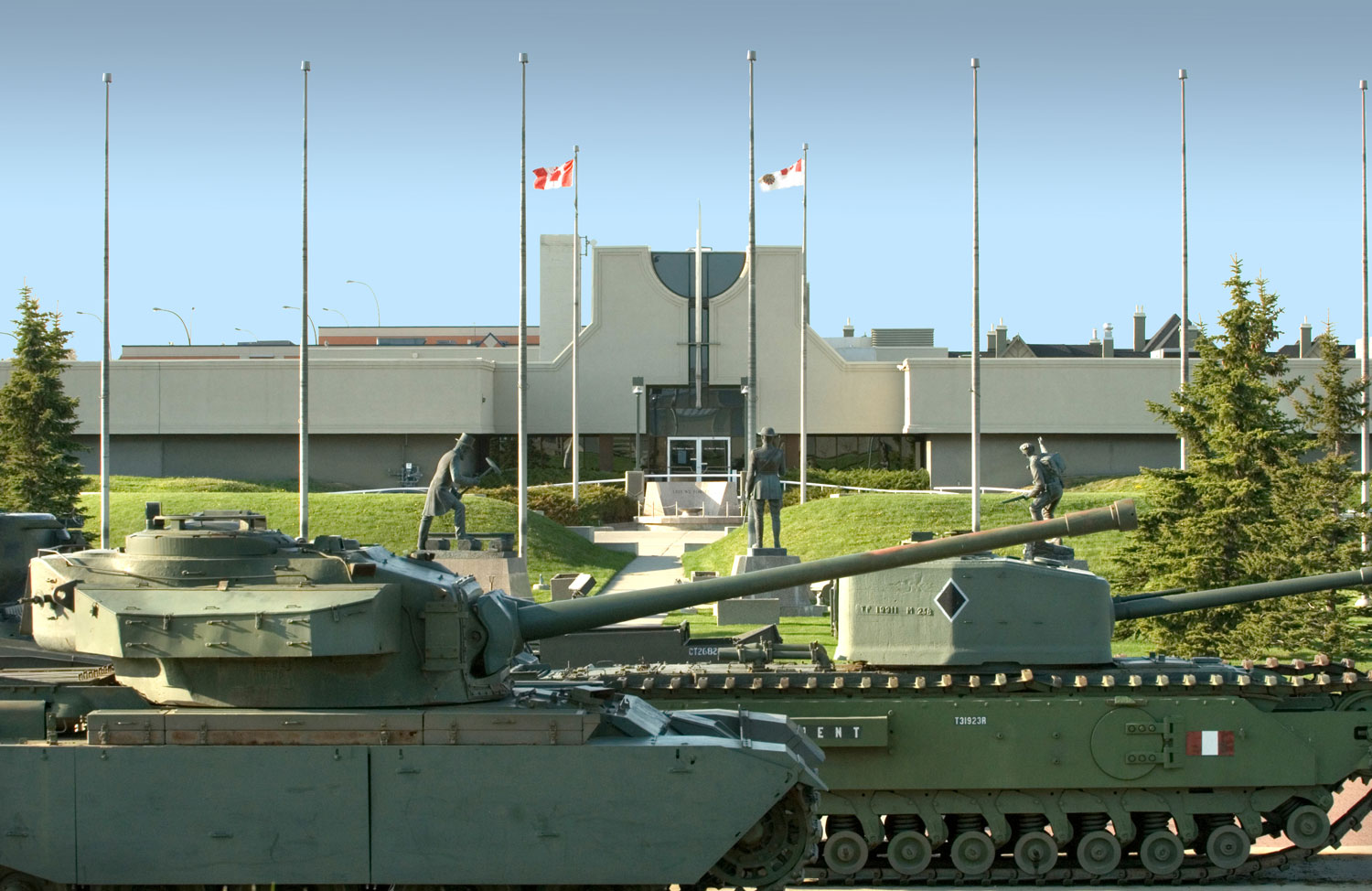

- Location in Calgary
- Established: 1990
- Location: 4520 Crowchild Trail SW, Calgary, Alberta, Canada
- Coordinates: 51.014°N 114.117°W
- Director: Ryan Goldsworthy
- Website: themilitarymuseums.ca

The Military Museums is a reorganization of the former Museum of the Regiments in Calgary, Alberta, Canada, announced by Sophie, Countess of Wessex, on 3 June 2006. The new museum comprises the former Museum of the Regiments as well as the relocated Naval Museum of Alberta and an Air Force Wing consisting of artifacts being acquired.

== History ==
The Museum of the Regiments was formally opened by Queen Elizabeth II on 30 June 1990, on what was then CFB Calgary. The museum, partnered with the Calgary Military Museums Society (CMMS), was a joint venture of the four military regiments in Calgary at that time, each with its own gallery.

The Military Museums preserves and documents the history of all three environmental commands of the Canadian Forces, the Royal Canadian Navy, Canadian Army, and Royal Canadian Air Force, with a focus on Alberta history, through an extensive public gallery and archival holding.

The museum collects, preserves, arranges, catalogues, interprets and exhibits to the public and members of CFB Calgary, the history of the base (which closed in 1998) and its garrison units. The goal is to stimulate the interest in the history of the base to all personnel of the base, and the general public to cooperate with other organizations having similar objectives.

== Memorials ==
On 11 August 1989, Patricia Knatchbull, 2nd Countess Mountbatten of Burma, the colonel-in-chief of Princess Patricia's Canadian Light Infantry, dedicated a memorial consisting of a granite base, metal bowl and two metal plaques to the memory of the war dead of the founding regiments of the museum: Lord Strathcona's Horse (Royal Canadians); the King's Own Calgary Regiment; Princess Patricia's Canadian Light Infantry and the Calgary Highlanders.

A brass plaque memorial, erected by the Manitoba Association of Lord Strathcona's Horse (Royal Canadians), is dedicated to the members of the regiment killed since 1900. A certificate lists the officers killed during the Second World War while serving with Lord Strathcona's Horse (Royal Canadians).

A brass plaque, erected by local Jewish servicemen, is dedicated to the memory of local Jewish war dead of the First and Second World Wars.

The Canadian Peacekeepers Roll of Honour at the museum's Southern Alberta Gallery lists the names of Canadians killed on peacekeeping duty from 1939 to 1993

The Naval Museum of Alberta Society and the Calgary naval community erected a memorial dedicated to all Royal Canadian Navy sailors who served, and particularly to those who died, during the Korean War. The memorial was officially unveiled on 25 June 2000 by the lieutenant governor of Alberta and the chief of the Maritime Staff.

== Museum of the Regiments ==
The former Museum of the Regiments consisted of galleries dedicated to four Calgary-area regiments:

=== Lord Strathcona's Horse (Royal Canadians) Regimental Museum and Archives ===
The Lord Strathcona's Horse (Royal Canadians) Regimental Museum and Archives educates members of the regiment and public-at-large in both the history of the Strathconas and the day-to-day life its members experience. Additionally, they provide a variety of other educational services to interested parties, including the public and educational institutions. The curatorial team partners with The Military Museums Foundation to aid in the training and development of Calgary Museum and Cultural Resource Management students, as well as to provide outreach and educational opportunities to the Calgary Area. The archives draws on a collection of records, photographs and art from the history of the regiment, and provides family and personal history reports at no cost to the public. Finally, the collections manager oversees uniforms, artefacts, and weapons and ensures they are available for display, study or examination. The museum is staffed by three full-time military members as well as part-time volunteers and students. Assorted vehicles, to include tanks, from the regiment's history are found throughout the grounds of the Military Museums.

=== Princess Patricia's Canadian Light Infantry Gallery ===
The gallery collects, arranges, catalogues, preserves, interprets and exhibits to the members of the regiment and the public, the medals, weapons, maps, implements, devices, and other goods and chattels of historical value and importance connected with the military and social development of Princess Patricia's Canadian Light Infantry (PPCLI) within the context of the Canadian Forces (Land). The goal is to stimulate interest in the history and development of PPCLI within the context of the Canadian Forces. The PPCLI became a Calgary regiment after the Second World War but traces its history to 1914.

A memorial consisting of stained glass, book of remembrance, and a wall of honour is dedicated to deceased members of PPCLI.

A statue, titled Let's Go! is dedicated to the 25,000 Canadians that served during the Korean War (1950–1953), in particular Private Malcolm McNeil of 2nd Battalion PPCLI.

=== The King's Own Calgary Regiment Gallery ===
The mandate is to supply regimental personnel and interested general public with a physical link to the unit's history as well as providing knowledge of past activities, battles, exploits, deeds of valour, and equipment. It is a depository for the safe keeping of historical items and information on the regiment. It is used by regimental personnel as an aid to recruiting, and by regimental instructors to illustrate tactics and strategy of past campaigns. The KOCR Gallery includes information related to the 103rd Regiment "Calgary Rifles", Calgary Regiment, Calgary Tanks, and 50th (Calgary) Battalion, CEF.

=== The Calgary Highlanders (10th Canadians) ===
The purpose of The Calgary Highlanders gallery is to collect, preserve, study and exhibit those objects that will serve to illustrate the story of the regiment in Canadian military history. Understanding its heritage gives a better appreciation of its traditions and uniqueness as a Western Canadian highland regiment. The gallery collects artifacts and specimens that depict the regiment's past in terms of the origins of the regiment, the First World War, the Second World War, United Nations Operations – Korea – 1950–1953, service during peacetime, its most recent deployments to Afghanistan and the 2013 Alberta floods and its ceremonies and traditions. It provides for the preservation of such material and for its availability to all those who wish to see and study it. The Calgary Highlanders Gallery covers the history of the regiment from the inception of the 103rd Regiment (Calgary Rifles) in 1910 through to the present, including the history of the 10th Battalion, CEF, and the Regimental Pipes and Drums. Life-size dioramas depict the fatal wounding of Lieutenant-Colonel Russell Lambert Boyle, the crossing of the Albert Canal by Sergeant C.K. Crockett, DCM, and an action in Zhari District, Afghanistan, for which Captain Simon Cox was Mentioned in Despatches.

== Other galleries ==
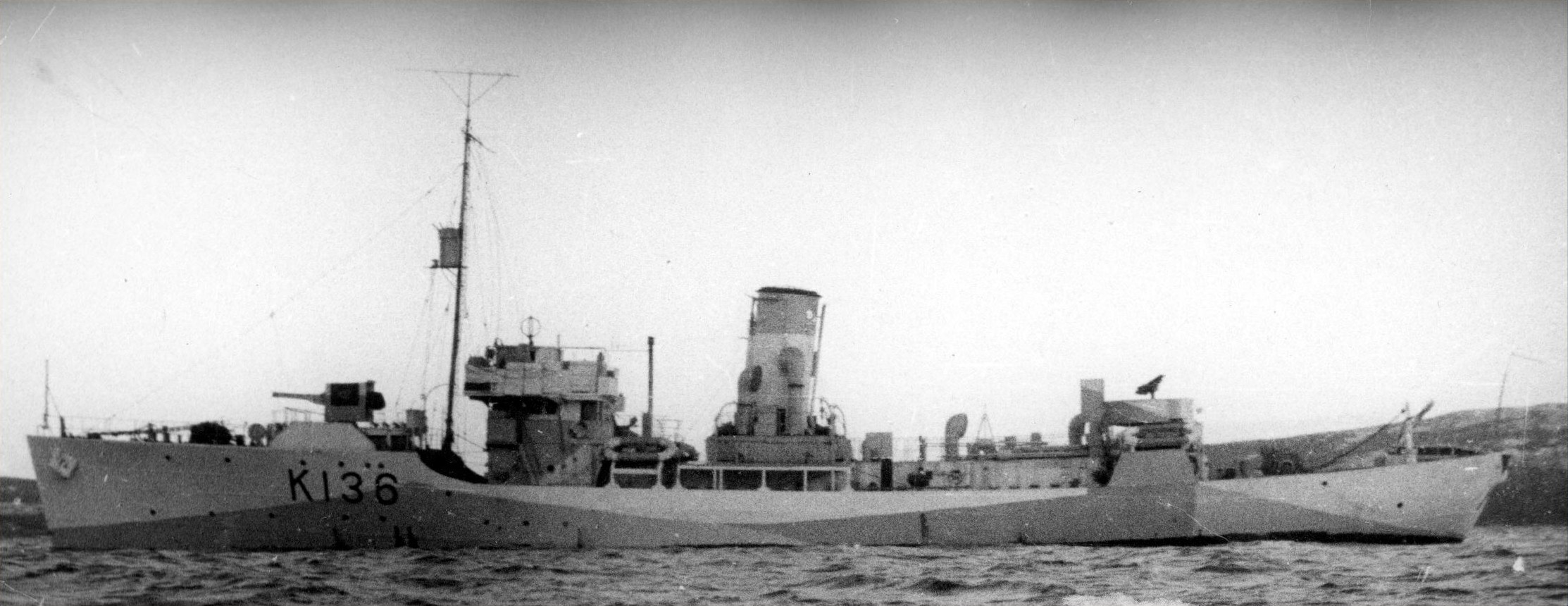
Naval Museum of Alberta Flower-class corvette HMCS Shawinigan

The LdSH (RC) and PPCLI regiments have since moved from the Calgary garrison to quarters in Edmonton.

The museum houses four galleries devoted to these four regiments, as well as a gallery devoted to the history of all military units in Alberta. A life-size diorama underneath the entryway to the museum includes a M4 Sherman tank and jeep, with the diorama being assembled before the museum entrance was completed.

There are several displays on the outdoor grounds of the museum, including an eternal flame, larger-than-life statues, and a collection of tanks, armoured cars, and anti-tank guns. A Canadair CF-5 is mounted by its tailpipes in a steep climb and visible from Crowchild Trail. In 2013 a Canadair CF-104 Starfighter was added as a permanent exhibit where it is housed in a hangar shared with a Canadair Sabre, while the neighboring hangar accommodates a McDonnell Douglas CF-18 Hornet which was retired after 26 years of service.

The memorial stained glass windows featuring 1944 and 1991 badges were dedicated by the Royal Canadian Electrical Mechanical Engineers Association of Alberta to members of the Electrical and Mechanical Engineering Branch and its predecessors.

The Founder's Gallery was officially opened in June 2009 by Sophie, Countess of Wessex.

== Library and archives ==
The museum also features an extensive military history library as part of the holdings of the University of Calgary library, as well as the regimental archives of the four regiments. The library is open to the general public and is operated by the University of Calgary Library and Cultural Resources.

== Education and outreach ==
The museum features a vibrant education programme for young people in the Calgary area; in addition to dozens of outreach speakers reaching thousands of people, approximately 7,000 children are given theme tours each year through the facility under the direction of Lorna Gutsche, the Manager of Education and Interpretive Programing. The museums have received a number of prestigious awards for such programming, including two from the Alberta Museums Association and one for Outstanding Achievement in Education from the Canadian Museums Association for a youth tour of Vimy Ridge arranged in 2006. An additional AMA award for excellence in public programming was presented in September 2007 for the museums' projects on the 90th anniversary of the battle for Vimy Ridge.

== Upgrades and renovations ==
The entryway of the museum was renamed the Queen Elizabeth II Atrium in May 2005 during a royal visit.

On 3 June 2006, the museum was renamed the Military Museums. The Naval Museum of Alberta and the Air Force Museum of Alberta and an improved library and archives facility have become part of the new institution. The museum has currently undergone renovations and an expansion to accommodate the Naval and Air Force Museums.

From February to April 2007, the Military Museums held its first major competition in honour of the 90th anniversary of the Battle of Vimy Ridge. The two winners of five categories (Essay, Multimedia, Song composition, Poem, Comic Strip) were invited to participate in a tour of Canadian battlefields in France and Belgium in July 2007.

== Calgary Military Museums Society ==
The original foundation, the Calgary Military Museums Society (CMMS) is no longer a functioning entity of TMM, but continues to operate on other projects and in 2012 was rebranded as Valour Canada.

== See also ==
- Canadian War Museum
- Organization of Military Museums of Canada
- Military history of Canada
