= 1922–23 Scottish Cup =

Tournament details
- Country: Scotland

Final positions
- Champions: Celtic
- Runners-up: Hibernian

The 1922–23 Scottish Cup was the 45th staging of Scotland's most prestigious football knockout competition. The Cup was won by Celtic, who defeated Hibernian 1–0 in the final.

== Fourth round ==
Team One	Team Two	Score
Celtic	Raith Rovers	1-0
Hibernian	Aberdeen	2-0
Motherwell	Bo'ness	4-2
Dundee	Third Lanark	0-0 1-1 0-1

== Semi-finals ==
10 March 1923

Celtic	2 – 0	Motherwell

Ibrox, Glasgow
Attendance: 71,506

10 March 1923

Hibernian	1 – 0	Third Lanark

Tynecastle, Edinburgh
Attendance: 39,000

== Final ==
31 March 1923

Celtic	1 – 0	Hibernian
Cassidy

Hampden Park, Glasgow
Attendance: 82,000

Celtic:
GK	(Scotland) Charlie Shaw
RB	(Scotland) Alec McNair
LB	(Scotland) Willie McStay
RH	(Scotland) Jimmy McStay
CH	(Scotland) Willie Cringan
LH	(Scotland) John McFarlane
OR	(Scotland) Andrew McAtee
IR	(Republic of Ireland) Patsy Gallacher
CF	(Scotland) Joe Cassidy
IL	(Scotland) Adam McLean
OL	(Scotland) Paddy Connolly
Manager:
(Scotland) Willie Maley

Hibernian:
GK	(Scotland) Bill Harper
RB	(Scotland) William McGinnigle
LB	(Scotland) William Dornan
RH	(Scotland) Peter Kerr
CH	(Scotland) Willie Miller
LH	(Scotland) Hugh Shaw
OR	(Scotland) Harry Ritchie
IR	(Scotland) Jimmy Dunn
CF	(Scotland) Jimmy McColl
IL	(Scotland) Johnny Halligan
OL	(Scotland) John Walker
Manager:
(Scotland) Alex Maley

== See also ==
- 1922–23 in Scottish football
