= Valour Canada =

- Formation: 1987 as Calgary Military Museums Society (CMMS)); 2012 as Valour Canada
- Type: Private non-profit
- Legal status: Active
- Purpose: Charitable organization
- Headquarters: 1820 24 St SW; Calgary, AB; T2T 0G6
- Region served: Canada
- President: John Q Adams
- Website: www.valourcanada.ca

Valour Canada is a Canadian not-for-profit organization. The organization is civilian-run, with a focus on fostering an appreciation for, and understanding of, military history. The organization was originally known as the Calgary Military Museums Society, a fund-raising organization for The Military Museums in Calgary. The CMMS rebranded as Valour Canada in 2012. The organization has been described as "(o)ne of the country's leading military history websites."

== Mandate ==
The Calgary Military Museums Society was originally incorporated on March 13, 1987 as a not-for-profit charitable organization. Its original mandate was to raise funds to build the Museum of the Regiments which opened in 1991. CMMS helped fund additional renovations to the museum in 2006, including the addition of galleries devoted to the Navy and Air Force. This expanded focus led to the museum being renamed The Military Museums.

In 2010, the CMMS ended its relationship with The Military Museums and in 2012 rebranded as Valour Canada.

The stated purpose and mission of Valour Canada is to connect Canadians to their military heritage, by creating engaging programs to educate Canadians, with a focus on youth, about the importance of Canada's military history.

== Leadership ==
Among past presidents are Tom Leppard and Peter J. Boyle. The current president is John Q Adams who has served from May 2022.

== Events ==
A Flame of Remembrance ceremony was held on November 10, 2013 atop the Calgary Tower to commemorate the Battle of Kapyong. Representatives of federal, provincial and municipal governments were in attendance, and the keynote speaker was Dr. David Bercuson.

=== General Sir Arthur Currie Award ===
Valour Canada hosts an annual General Sir Arthur Currie Award and Gala. The event includes a fund-raising dinner, keynote speakers, and entertainment including the presenting of the General Sir Arthur Currie award. The award is bestowed annually to pay tribute to a "Canadian who has made a significant contribution to the country's military heritage." Past recipients include Fred Mannix in 2006, Dr. Jack Granatstein in 2007, Daryl Seaman, who received the award posthumously in 2014, Jody Mitic in 2015, The Royal Canadian Legion in 2017, and Commander Charles Needham Mawer who received the award in 2019.

Calgary City Council made a motion of recognition to Jody Mitic for receiving the "prestigious General Sir Arthur Currie Award" on May 11, 2015.

Gala hosts have included David Gray, former president of the Alberta Press Gallery and national host of CBC News: Today (2017).

== Educational programs ==
A program to place QR codes at public places of military significance was launched in November 2011. The Calgary Soldiers' Memorial was selected as the initial site for the codes. The codes linked to videos about Lieutenant-Colonel Russell Lambert Boyle and Private John George Pattison, both of whose names appear on the memorial. Additional QR codes have been placed, including at Captain Nichola Goddard school in Calgary in 2012.

== Partnerships ==
Valour Canada is partnered with a number of educational institutions across Canada, such as Royal Roads University.
