= William Dornan =

Scottish footballer

Personal information
- Date of birth: 17 January 1893
- Place of birth: Holytown, Scotland
- Date of death: 28 May 1937 (aged 44)
- Place of death: Edinburgh, Scotland
- Position: Left back

Senior career*
Years	Team	Apps	(Gls)
–	Pumpherston Rangers		
1913–1914	Leith Athletic	10	(0)
1914–1928	Hibernian	357	(0)
1914–1915	→ Leith Athletic (loan)	25	(0)
1928–1931	Queen of the South	107	(1)
Total		499	(1)
- * Club domestic league appearances and goals

William Dornan (17 January 1893 – 28 May 1937) was a Scottish footballer who appeared 389 times in the Scottish Football League and Scottish Cup for Hibernian between 1914 and 1927, playing at left back. He featured in two Scottish Cup finals in 1923 (which Hibs lost to Celtic) and 1924 (defeated by Airdrieonians). He also played for Leith Athletic and Queen of the South.

Dornan was badly injured on 28 May 1937, after being thrown from the top of an oil tank after an explosion, and thereafter being badly burned, at Pumpherston Oil Works in West Lothian. He died later at the Edinburgh Royal Infirmary.
