= Peter Kerr (footballer, born 1891) =

Scottish footballer and manager

Personal information
- Full name: Peter Simpson Dennitts Kerr
- Birth name: Peter Dennitts
- Date of birth: 20 June 1891
- Place of birth: Prestonpans, Scotland
- Date of death: 24 April 1969 (aged 77)
- Place of death: Haddington, Scotland
- Positions: Right back; right half

Youth career
- Prestonpans

Senior career*
Years	Team	Apps	(Gls)
–	Wallyford Bluebell		
–	Weymss Athletic		
1910–1926	Hibernian	442	(15)
1926–1931	Hearts	105	(4)
1931–1932	Leith Athletic	2	(0)
Total		549	(19)

International career
1923–1926	Scottish League XI	2	(0)
1924	Scotland	1	(0)

Managerial career
- 1932–1939: Leith Athletic
- * Club domestic league appearances and goals

Peter Simpson Dennitts Kerr (20 June 1891 – 24 April 1969) was a Scottish football player and manager, who played for three Edinburgh clubs in a 21-year senior career: Hibernian (fifteen years), Heart of Midlothian (five years) and Leith Athletic (one year as a player followed by seven as manager). He also played once for Scotland.

== Career ==
=== Club ===
Kerr began his senior career with Hibernian in 1910, having previously played with junior sides Prestonpans FC, Wallyford Bluebell and Wemyss Athletic. Kerr was signed as a replacement for Scotland international fullback James Main, who died as a result of injuries sustained on the football pitch on Christmas Day 1909, but played most of his career as a right half. He was a mainstay of the side over the next 16 years, helping Hibs to reach three Scottish Cup Finals, although on each occasion he ended up on the losing side: in 1914, Hibs drew the initial final 0–0 with Celtic but succumbed 4–1 in the replay at Ibrox; Celtic again proved too strong in 1923, while the following year Hughie Gallacher's Airdrie won 2–0.

In 1926, the then 34-year-old Kerr switched from the east side of Edinburgh to the west, joining Hibs' rivals Hearts. Hearts side at this time contained numerous youngsters and the Tynecastle side's directors felt Kerr would provide a steadying influence to counter youthful inconsistency. He spent five seasons with Hearts before joining his third and final Edinburgh club, Leith Athletic in 1931. He played one season for Leith, during which they suffered relegation from Division One, before retiring two months shy of his 41st birthday. He was appointed Leith's manager in 1932.

=== International ===
Kerr gained representative honours for the Scottish Football League's representative team in 1923, and his consistent play with Hibs earned him selection for the Scotland national team in March 1924. His debut, aged 32, in a 2–0 win over Ireland, also proved to be his last international appearance, although he would get one further SFL cap in 1926 while with Hearts.

== See also ==
- List of footballers in Scotland by number of league appearances (500+)
