= Johnny Halligan =

Scottish footballer and manager (1899–1977)

Personal information
- Full name: John Donegan Halligan
- Date of birth: 1899
- Place of birth: Glasgow, Scotland
- Date of death: 1977 (aged 77–78)
- Place of death: Glasgow, Scotland
- Position: Inside left

Senior career*
Years	Team	Apps	(Gls)
- Shawfield
1920–1934	Hibernian	413	(67)
1937–1938	Montrose	25	(10)
Total		438	(77)
- * Club domestic league appearances and goals

John Donegan Halligan (1899 – 1977) was a Scottish football player and manager. Halligan played as an inside left for Shawfield, Hibernian and Montrose.

== Career ==
Halligan signed for Hibernian from Shawfield – a Junior side from south Glasgow – on 30 October 1920, around the same time as two other emerging forwards from the same area, Jimmy Dunn and John Walker, and all three became important members of the team which played in two losing Scottish Cup finals in 1923 (to Celtic) and 1924 (to Airdrieonians).

Halligan also remained with the club when they were relegated in 1931 and helped them regain their top division place two years later, winning the 1932–33 Scottish Division Two title. He was a regular in the team until his last game, at home to Falkirk on 14 October 1933, after which he was advised to retire on medical grounds. In all he played 457 times for Hibs in major competitions and scored 74 goals.

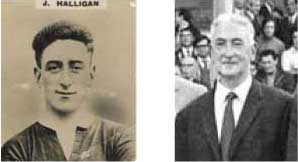
Johnny Halligan as player and later in life

Halligan also worked for Hibernian as a coach and scout (from 1933), and in February 1936 was appointed caretaker manager of Hibernian (a job he apparently detested) after the resignation of Bobby Templeton; he held the position for over two months until Willie McCartney became manager. His managerial record in the league was played 11, won 6, drawn 1 and lost 4. He made a brief playing comeback for Montrose in the 1937–38 season.

He died in Glasgow in 1977, aged 77.
