= Calgary Soldiers' Memorial =

War monument in Calgary, Alberta, Canada

Coordinates: 51°03′03″N 114°05′20″W

- Calgary Soldiers' Memorial Committee
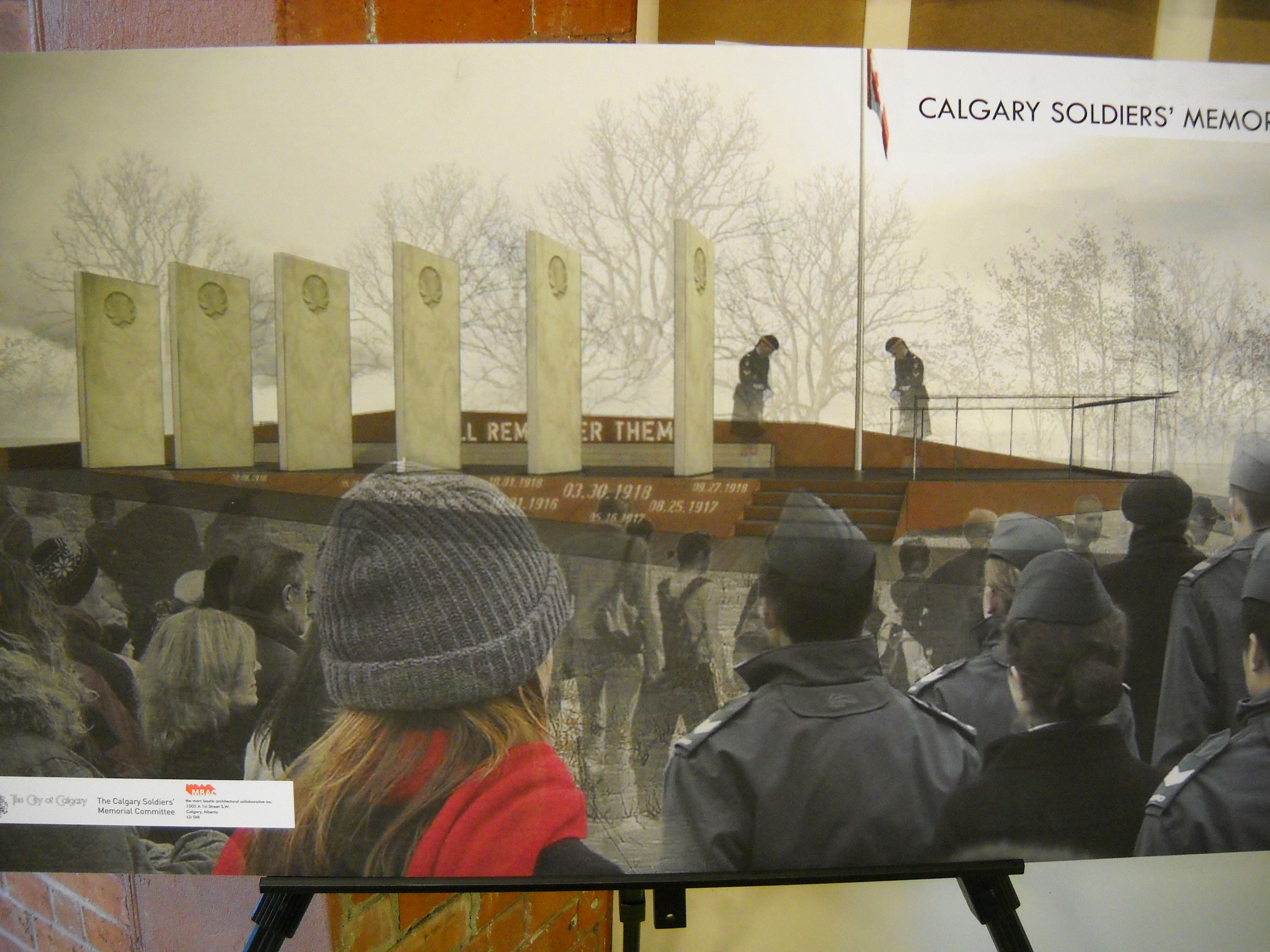
- Architectural conception of the finished memorial design
- For Calgary area war dead who served in Calgary army units
- Unveiled: April 9, 2011
- Location: near Calgary, Alberta, Canada
- Designed by: Marc Boutin Architectural Collaborative
- Commemorated: Approximately 3,000
- The memorial is inscribed with the legend "We Will Remember Them" (the final words of the Act of Remembrance) as well as the dates of several Battle Honours granted to the Calgary area regiments to whom the soldiers commemorated by the memorial belonged.

The Calgary Soldiers' Memorial is a war monument in Calgary, Alberta, that was dedicated on April 9, 2011, the anniversary of the Battle of Vimy Ridge. The monument is dedicated to Calgary area soldiers who have given their lives in war and military service overseas. The monument is on Memorial Drive and bears the names of 3,000 soldiers from the Calgary area who died in military service.

== Concept ==
The Calgary Soldiers' Memorial consists of several stone tablets bearing the names of soldiers from Calgary area regiments killed during times of war. These regiments include, in order of precedence, The King's Own Calgary Regiment, 41 Combat Engineer Regiment, 746 (Calgary) Communications Squadron, The Calgary Highlanders, 41 Service Battalion and 15 Field Ambulance. Also represented on the tablets are those units of the Canadian Expeditionary Force perpetuated by the current Calgary units of the Canadian Forces, including the 10th Battalion, CEF and 50th Battalion, CEF.

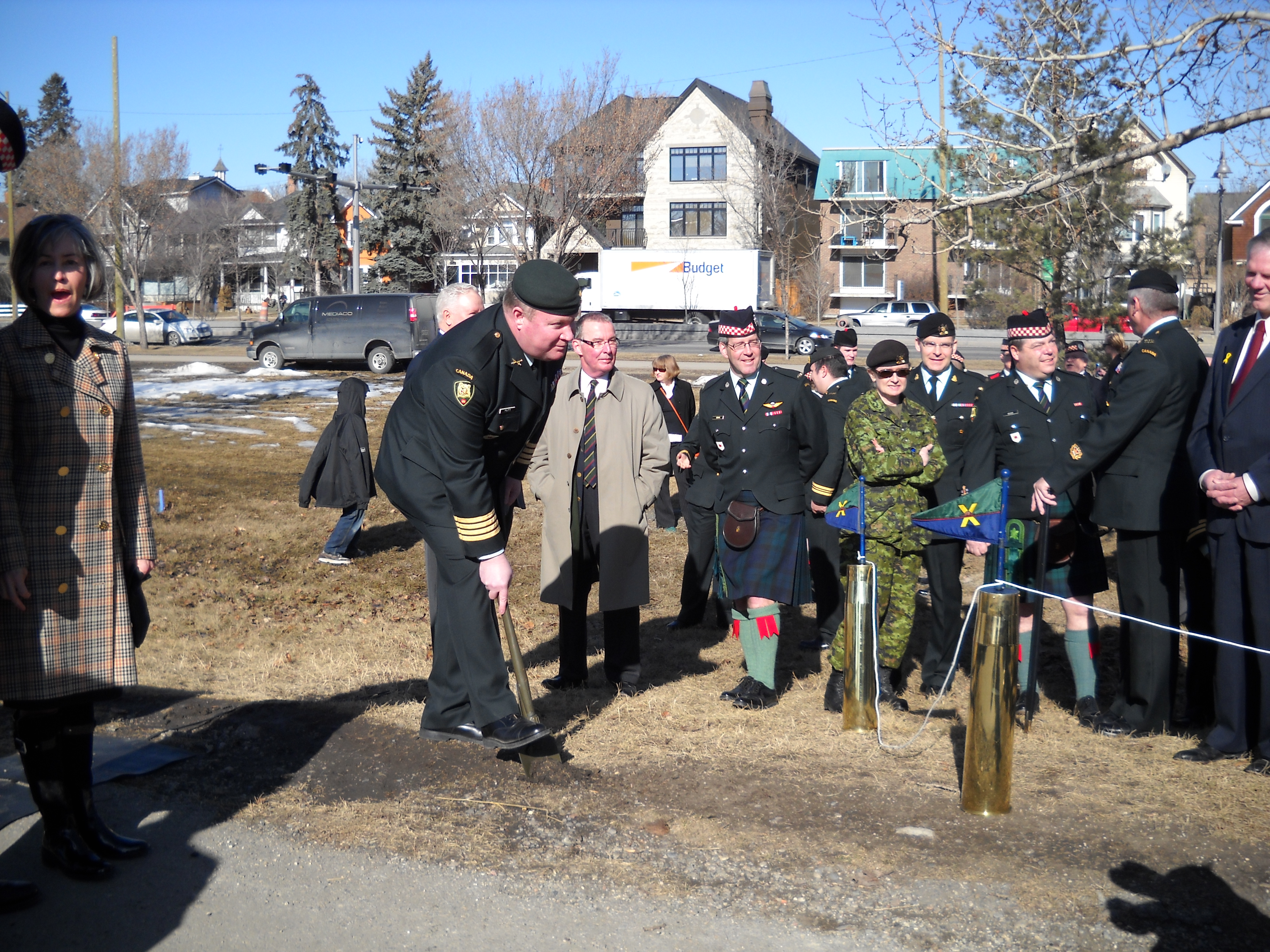
Groundbreaking ceremony on March 6, 2010. Colonel Thomas Putt, commander of 41 Canadian Brigade Group, breaks ground with a military entrenching tool. At left is City Councillor Druh Farrell, in whose ward the proposed monument was to be located. Visible in the photo are soldiers and veterans of the King's Own Calgary Regiment and The Calgary Highlanders. At centre is the commanding officer of the Highlanders, Lieutenant-Colonel Mike Vernon.

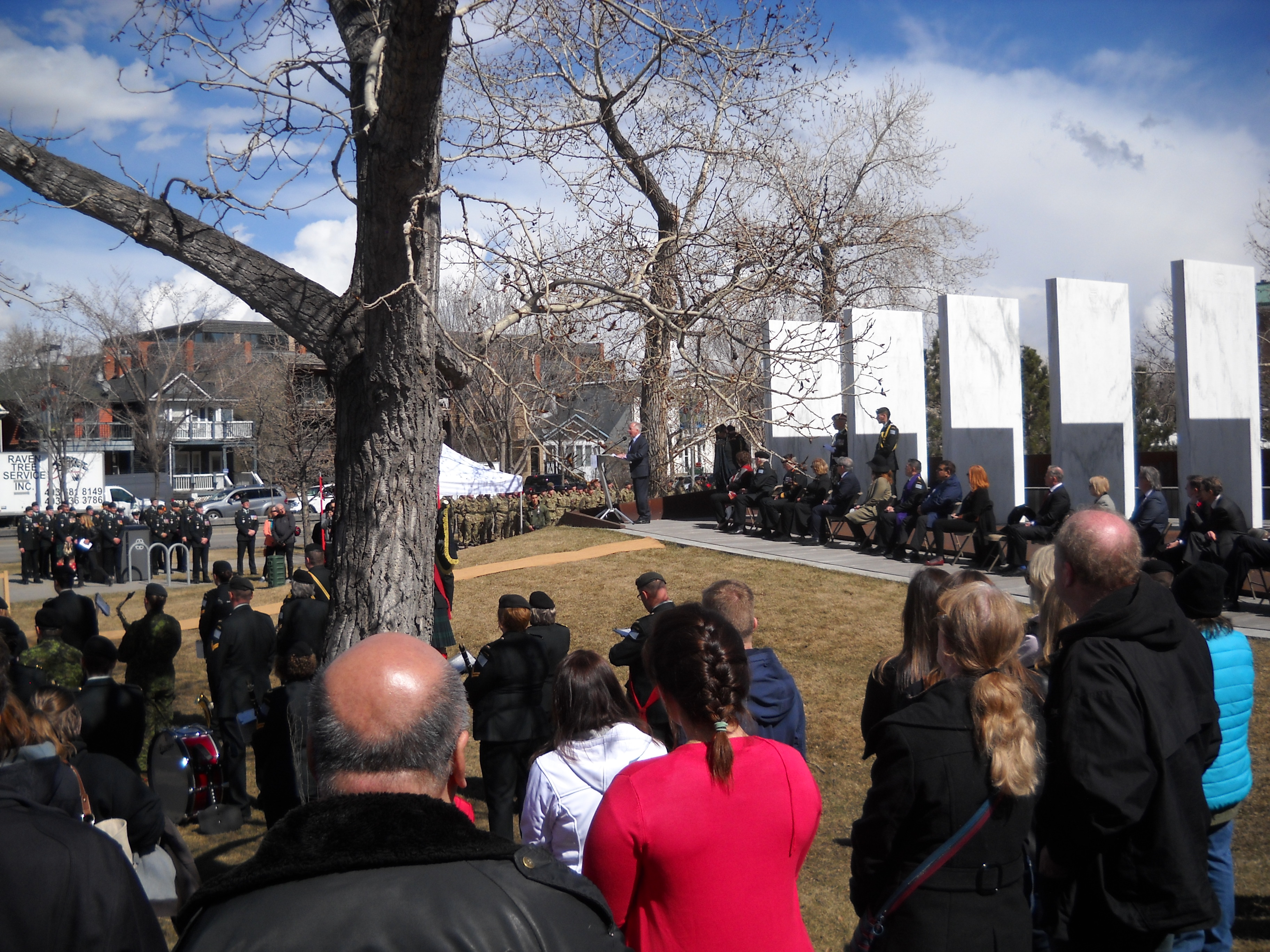
Parade at the Calgary Soldiers' Memorial to commemorate the Battle of Vimy Ridge on April 8, 2017

== History ==
Planning for the memorial began in 2008, and was originally conceived as one of several centennial projects during the 100th anniversary celebrations of The Calgary Highlanders. The original target date for the memorial was Remembrance Day 2010. The Calgary Soldiers' Memorial Committee was chaired by Captain Peter Boyle of The Calgary Highlanders.

=== Fund raising ===
By January 2010 over $700,000 had been raised, including $5,000 from the local Dutch-Canadian community which marked the 65th anniversary of Canadian liberation of the Netherlands that year. Fund raising included an annual Loops for the Troops run founded by Michael Hornburg, the father of Corporal Nathan Hornburg who was killed in Afghanistan in 2007. In 2009 the charity walk and run raised over $100,000 and funds from the 2010 event were donated to the memorial. The final amount raised exceeded one million dollars.

=== Location ===
The City of Calgary was included in the planning, adapting the memorial design into its own "Memorial Drive - Landscape of Memory" project which had begun in 2004 to revitalize a nine-kilometre stretch of Memorial Drive. These renovations included the replacement of aging poplar trees planted along Memorial Drive in 1922 as living memorials to soldiers lost in the First World War. Dying trees were replaced with seedlings from the original poplars. The intersection of Memorial Drive and 10th Street West was renovated into "Poppy Plaza" to incorporate new foliage, lighting, and metal sculptures. The plaza was designed to acknowledge Calgary's efforts in times of war while also functioning as a public space. The project cost was $9.2 million, and incorporated rust-coloured steel panels which were used to line the riverside walkway. The Calgary Soldiers' Memorial was located on a green space adjoining the Poppy Plaza. This location was chosen to allow "...the thousands who drive, bike or walk by the spot every day to think about what it means." At the dedication, Mayor Nenshi stated that "People drive, cycle and walk along Memorial Drive every day, sometimes forgetting it's a memorial." The site chosen is also significant in that the memorial looks across the Bow River towards Mewata Armoury, a "mustering point from which many Canadian soldiers departed to serve their country."

According to public notice given by the city, the official address of the memorial is 1209 Memorial Drive NW.

== Design ==
The final design of the memorial was created by the Marc Boutin Architectural Collaborative, and integrated into the City of Calgary's "Memorial Drive - Landscape of Memory" project. The design for Poppy Plaza, adjacent to the memorial, incorporated towering metal gateways of "weathered steel" intended to convey the passage of time. "Narratives" consisting of quotations related to Canadian experiences in war were cut into the metal sheeting lining the plaza and riverbank. The design was criticized for poorly selected quotes, and a lack of contextual information regarding Canadian sacrifices which the plaza and adjacent Soldiers' Memorial were intended to highlight.

== Construction ==
A ceremonial groundbreaking took place on March 6, 2010.

The finished monument was unveiled on the 94th anniversary of the Battle of Vimy Ridge on Saturday, April 9, 2011. A guard of honour of soldiers of 41 Canadian Brigade Group was present at the ceremony and was inspected by Lieutenant-Governor Don Ethell. Mayor Naheed Nenshi attended the dedication with a crowd of about 100 Calgarians.

The names of soldiers killed in Afghanistan were not engraved onto the memorial before the unveiling, as officials wanted to wait for the official end to the war in Afghanistan before including them. After the withdrawal of Canadian troops in 2014, the project head, Major Peter Boyle, expressed a desire to have those names included in time for Remembrance Day that year but circumstances prevented their inclusion. The memorial is actually owned by the City of Calgary and permission had to be secured by the project to alter the memorial. The names of two civilians killed in Afghanistan were included in the original carving of 3,000 names, representing Calgary Herald journalist Michelle Lang who was killed while imbedded with Canadian Forces soldiers in 2009, and diplomat Glyn Berry who was killed travelling in a military convoy in 2006.

== Public events ==
The memorial has been the focus of public events since its unveiling.

A program initiated by Valour Canada to place QR codes at public places of military significance was launched in November 2011. The Calgary Soldiers' Memorial was selected as the initial site for the codes. The codes linked to videos about Lieutenant-Colonel Russell Lambert Boyle and Private John George Pattison, both of whose names appear on the memorial.

On April 8, 2017 a parade was held to mark the 100th anniversary of the Battle of Vimy Ridge. Over 300 soldiers from all of Calgary's reserve army units were joined by British soldiers of British Army Training Unit Suffield in a march from Mewata Armouries to the memorial. Lieutenant-Governor Lois Mitchell inspected the troops and paid tribute to the efforts of Canadian soldiers from across Canada at Vimy Ridge, as well as the often-forgotten role British soldiers played in the battle.

In May 2020, the consulate of the United Kingdom launched a live 24-hour global relay marathon to raise money for charities related to the COVID-19 pandemic and selected the memorial as the launching point in order to also commemorate the 75th anniversary of Victory in Europe Day.
