= Jock McDougall =

Scottish footballer

Personal information
- Full name: John McDougall
- Date of birth: 21 September 1901
- Place of birth: Port Glasgow, Scotland
- Date of death: 26 September 1973 (aged 72)
- Place of death: Greenock, Scotland
- Position: Centre half

Senior career*
Years	Team	Apps	(Gls)
–	Kilmacolm Amateurs		
–	Port Glasgow Athletic Juniors		
1921–1929	Airdrieonians	262	(19)
1929–1934	Sunderland	167	(4)
1934–1937	Leeds United	52	(0)
Total		481	(23)

International career
1925–1927	Scottish League XI	2	(0)
1926	Scotland	1	(0)
- * Club domestic league appearances and goals

John McDougall (21 September 1901 – 26 September 1973) was a Scottish footballer who played for Airdrieonians, Sunderland, Leeds United and Scotland as a centre half.

== Club career ==
McDougall started his professional career with Airdrieonians in 1921. With the signing of Hughie Gallacher the same year, they became a national force to be reckoned with, finishing Scottish Football League runners up in four successive seasons as well as winning the 1924 Scottish Cup Final.

McDougall was sold to Sunderland in 1929 for £4,500. He made his debut for the club on 7 September 1929 against Manchester City in a 5–2 win at Roker Park. Overall, he made 187 Football League and FA Cup appearances, scoring 5 goals, whilst at Sunderland from 1929 to 1934.

He then moved to Leeds United where he made 59 league and cup appearances and scored once (against Wolverhampton Wanderers in the 1935–36 FA Cup). He then retired from playing in 1937.

=== International ===
While at Airdrie he was capped once at full level for Scotland in a 4–0 win against Ireland in February 1926, and also played twice for the Scottish Football League XI.

== Personal life ==
His younger brother Jimmy McDougall was also a footballer who played for Partick Thistle and Liverpool, and appeared twice for Scotland.
