= Jimmy Somerville (footballer) =

Scottish footballer

Personal information
- Date of birth: c. 1900
- Place of birth: Stenhousemuir, Scotland
- Position: Outside left

Youth career
- Gairdoch Juveniles

Senior career*
Years	Team	Apps	(Gls)
1918–1920	Falkirk	24	(1)
1920	East Stirlingshire		
1920–1922	Stenhousemuir	33	(5)
1922–1930	Airdrieonians	258	(65)
Total		315	(71)
- * Club domestic league appearances and goals

James Somerville (born c. 1900) was a Scottish footballer who played as an outside left, most prominently for Airdrieonians, where he won the Scottish Cup in 1924 and was an important member of the team as they finished runners-up in the Scottish Football League in four successive seasons. He also played for all three of his local senior clubs: Falkirk East Stirlingshire, and Stenhousemuir.
