= Willie Miller (footballer, born 1895) =

Scottish footballer

Personal information
- Full name: William Hannah Miller
- Date of birth: 1895
- Place of birth: Glasgow, Scotland
- Date of death: 1970 (aged 74–75)
- Place of death: Glasgow, Scotland
- Position: Centre half

Senior career*
Years	Team	Apps	(Gls)
–	Cambuslang Rangers		
1916–1928	Hibernian	275	(30)
- * Club domestic league appearances and goals

William Hannah Miller (1895–1970) was a Scottish footballer who played as a centre half for Hibernian.

== Career ==
Born in Glasgow, Miller joined Hibernian from Junior team Cambuslang Rangers, where he likely took an active role in the club's consecutive Glasgow Junior Football League wins in the 1914–15 and 1915–16 seasons before moving up to senior level. In that World War I period he was also serving in the British military as a Private.

He went on to make 301 appearances with Hibernian, his only professional club, in the Scottish Football League and Scottish Cup over the next 11 years; initially he played at inside left, and scored most of his 32 goals in that role during his first two seasons at Easter Road before moving back to the 'pivot' position. Miller played in the Scottish Cup finals of 1923 (in which his team were beaten by Celtic) and 1924 (defeated by Airdrieonians). In 1928, he was released on a free transfer.

== Personal life ==
He is one of four men named Willie Miller to play for the club, all over different eras and unrelated to one another. His father George Miller was a director at Partick Thistle for several years.
