= Willie Russell =

Scottish footballer

Personal information
- Full name: William Fraser Russell
- Date of birth: 6 December 1901
- Place of birth: Falkirk, Scotland
- Date of death: 30 November 1944 (aged 42)
- Position: Inside right

Senior career*
Years	Team	Apps	(Gls)
–	Benburb		
1920–1925	Airdrieonians	127	(37)
1925–1931	Preston North End	133	(35)
1931–1932	Shelbourne		
Total		263	(72)

International career
1924–1925	Scotland	2	(0)
1924–1925	Scottish Football League XI	2	(2)
- * Club domestic league appearances and goals

William Fraser Russell (born 6 December 1901 in Falkirk, died 30 November 1944) was a Scottish professional footballer who played as an inside right. He scored both goals for Airdrieonians in the 1924 Scottish Cup Final.

== Playing career ==
=== Airdrieonians ===
He formed part of a potent Airdrie front line including Hughie Gallacher and Bob McPhail. Russell scored both goals for the Diamonds when they won the 1924 Scottish Cup Final against Hibernian. McPhail said, "The terror-like attitude of Gallacher caused havoc with the Hibs defenders. He and Russell were easily our best forwards". They also finished second that season in Scotland's top division, both outcomes marking the pinnacle of the club's achievements.

After five full seasons in Airdrie, he moved to Preston North End in England, where he spent around the same length of time, then had a short spell with Irish club Shelbourne in the autumn of his career.

=== International ===
Russell represented Scotland twice, debuting in the season of the cup win on 16 February 1924 in a 2–0 defeat to Wales in Cardiff. His second and final full cap was on 4 April 1925 in a 2–0 win against England at Hampden Park; Airdrie teammate Gallacher scored both goals. He also represented the Scottish League twice in the season after the cup win. He played in a 3–0 win against the Irish League at Tynecastle Park and scored twice in a 4–3 defeat to England at Goodison Park (Gallacher was the other Scottish scorer).
