= William McGinnigle =

Scottish footballer

Personal information
- Full name: William George McGinnigle
- Date of birth: 5 June 1892
- Place of birth: Paisley, Scotland
- Date of death: 11 October 1947 (aged 55)
- Place of death: Paisley, Scotland
- Position: Right back

Senior career*
Years	Team	Apps	(Gls)
–	Cambuslang Rangers		
1918–1929	Hibernian	297	(4)
1918	→ Celtic (loan)	1	(0)
–	Coleraine		

International career
1924	Scottish League XI	1	(0)
- * Club domestic league appearances and goals

William George McGinnigle (5 June 1892 – 11 Oct 1947) was a Scottish footballer who played as a right back for Cambuslang Rangers, Hibernian, Celtic and Coleraine.

He made 333 appearances for Hibs in the Scottish Football League and Scottish Cup including two finals of the knockout competition (1923 and 1924, both ending in defeat). In contrast, he played in only one league fixture for Celtic on an emergency loan due to wartime circumstances in 1918, which they won on the way to winning the championship by a single point.

He was selected once for the Scottish Football League XI in 1924 and took part in the Home Scots v Anglo-Scots trial match a year earlier, but never received a full international cap.

McGinnigle served in the British Army Argyll & Sutherland Highlanders during the First World War and he was awarded the 1914-15 Star, British War Medal and the Victory Medal.
