= Jonathan Walker =

Jonathan Walker may refer to:

- Jonathan Walker (abolitionist) (1799–1878), American reformer and abolitionist
- Jonathan Walker (rugby league) (born 1991), currently playing for Castleford Tigers
- Jonathan Hoge Walker (died 1824), United States federal judge
- Jonathan Lloyd Walker (born 1967), English actor
- Jon Walker (born 1985), American musician
- Jonny Walker (soccer) (born 1974), American soccer goalkeeper

== See also ==
- Johnnie Walker (disambiguation)
- John Walker (disambiguation)
