= John Walker (horticulturist) =

Canadian horticulturist and plant breeder

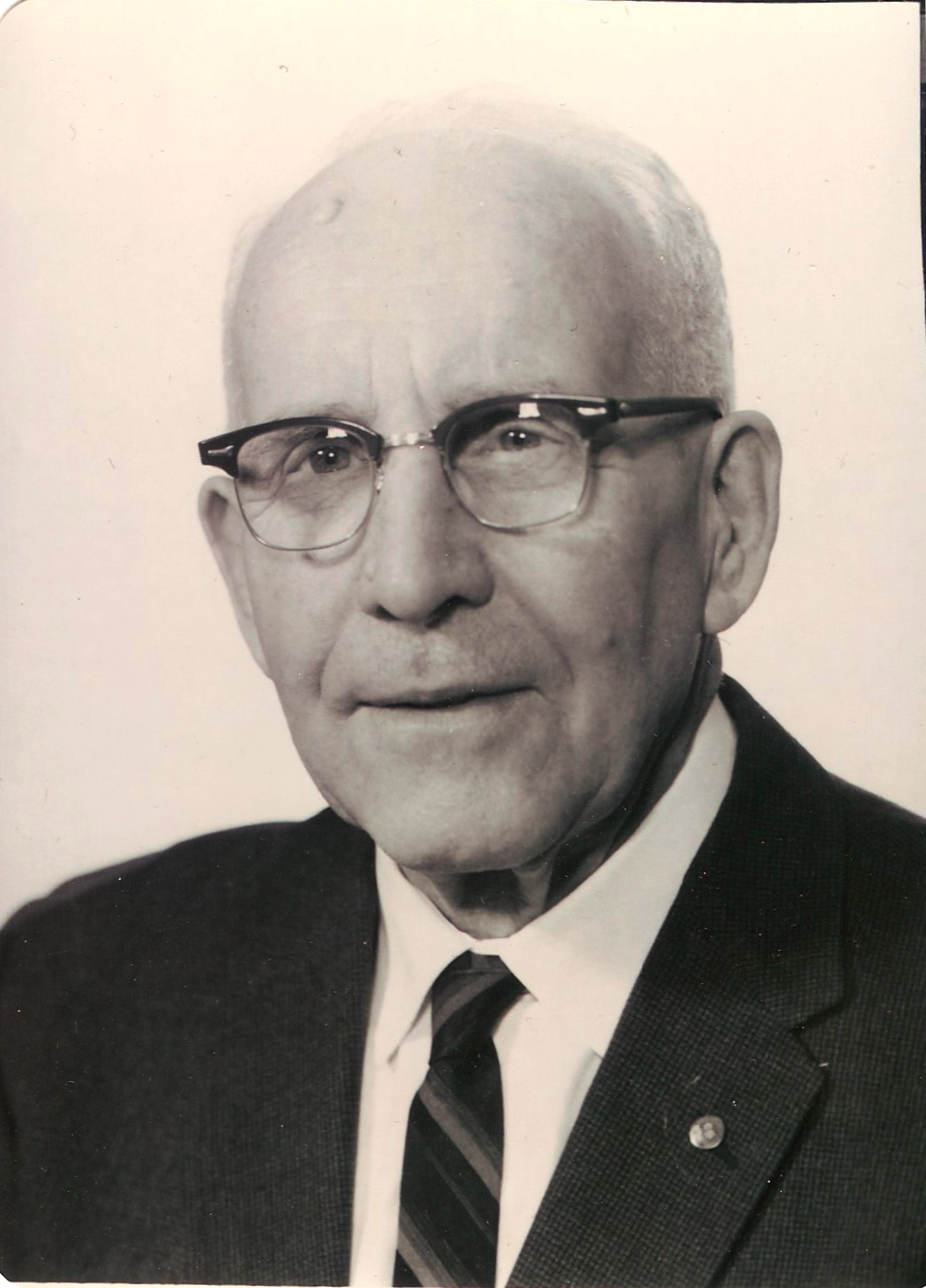
John Walker (c.1968)

John Walker (16 May 1893 – 6 January 1991) was a Canadian horticulturist and plant breeder who developed numerous varieties of trees and shrubs. His selections have been used in shelterbelts and landscaping applications across Canada and in northern countries around the world. Some of his selections include:

- Coronation Triumph Potentilla
- Density and Korman Spirea
- Jubilee Willow
- Radiance Amur Maple
- Prairie Princess Phlox
- Garry Pink Viburnum
- Hill Poplar
- Walker Poplar
- Walker Caragana

He was a founding member of the Indian Head Horticultural Society and past president of the Saskatchewan Institute of Agrologists, the Saskatchewan Horticultural Societies Association, the Western Canadian Society for Horticulture, and was a member of many other national and international horticultural organizations. He was a prolific contributor to The Prairie Garden magazine and also served as editor.

== Early life and education ==
John Walker was born near New Deer, Aberdeenshire, Scotland at Hardbedlam Farm on 16 May 1893. His parents were James Walker (1856-1941), a farmer, and Margaret Ironside (1863-1956), who had eight children together. James also had two children with a previous wife, Margaret Delgarno (1857-1888).

Walker obtained his early education at New Deer public school and Gordon's College in Aberdeen. He received his Intermediate Leaving Certificate in 1909 at the age of 16. Following his mother's keen interest in flowers and plants, Walker began an apprenticeship in gardening at Idvies House, near Lethan, Forfar, Scotland in July 1909. There he received training in the cleaning and care of the hot water boilers that heated the greenhouses. He later received training on the care of a wide range of annual and perennial vegetables and flowers. In 1912, as a qualified journeyman, Walker accepted an appointment at Murthly Castle in Perthshire, Scotland to carry out similar work to that at Idvies house.

Around that time, opportunities in overseas countries were widely advertised, and in 1913, Walker arranged to leave Scotland for Canada, having been assured work at the Dominion Experimental Station in Lethbridge, Alberta. He departed Glasgow, Scotland on 22 March 1913 aboard the ship S.S. Scotian and arrived in Halifax, Nova Scotia on 31 March 1913, from where he proceeded by train to Lethbridge. There he worked in the garden and grounds during the summers of 1913 and 1914, enrolling in classes at the School of Agriculture in Claresholm, Alberta during the winters. He obtained a Diploma in Agriculture in April 1915, and was appointed gardener-in-charge at the Experimental Station in Lacombe, Alberta in April of that year.

== Military service ==
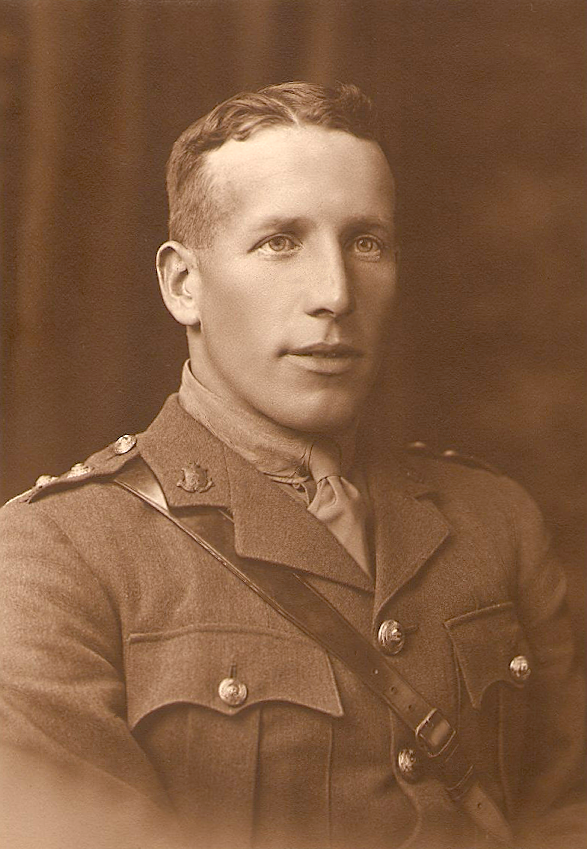
John Walker in 1918

With World War I entering its second year, Walker enlisted for overseas service as a private in the 50th Battalion, Canadian Expeditionary Force, Calgary, Alberta, and was taken on strength on 31 August 1915. The camp where he completed his training was located at Sarcee, near Calgary.

His unit, along with three other units comprising the 4th Infantry Division, Canadian Expeditionary Force, left Canada for England in October 1915. Their camp was in the south of England, near Bramshott, Hampshire, and they trained there until August 1916. Walker was a member of what was called the “Bomber Section” with special training in the use of grenades, etc.

Their destination in France was the Somme near Amiens, where they manned the wet and muddy trenches until the spring of 1917. Their next move was to an area near Arras, opposite Lens, where the unit took part in an offensive drive in April. By this time, Walker had been promoted to the rank of Sergeant.

In a later offensive action in June 1917, Walker was wounded in the right leg and left arm by shell fragments and was evacuated to England for hospitalization. After recovering from his wounds, Walker was designated to take an officer's training course. After successful completion of the course, he was promoted to the rank of Lieutenant, and was assigned for duty in the Valanciennes area in 1918.

After the armistice was signed in November 1918, Walker's unit remained in southwest Belgium as part of the Occupation Force until they returned to Canada in June 1919. Demobilization took place in Calgary, Alberta.

Walker continued to be associated with the military after his return to civilian life, being involved with C.O.T.C while attending university in Edmonton, Alberta, between 1924 and 1925, and at the University of Manitoba between 1939 and 1942, including one summer period at Camp Shilo in Manitoba. He was also officer-in-charge, with the rank of Acting Major, of the Reserve Artillery Unit, 76th Field Battery, at Indian Head, Saskatchewan, from 1943 to 1945.

== Undergraduate and graduate studies ==
Walker enrolled in the Agriculture Degree program at the University of Alberta, Edmonton, Alberta, in the fall of 1921. He obtained his Bachelor of Science degree in 1924. He then pursued post graduate studies at the University of Minnesota, where he conducted vegetable production research on peat land and had teaching assignments. He was awarded a Master of Science degree in 1926.

== Personal life ==
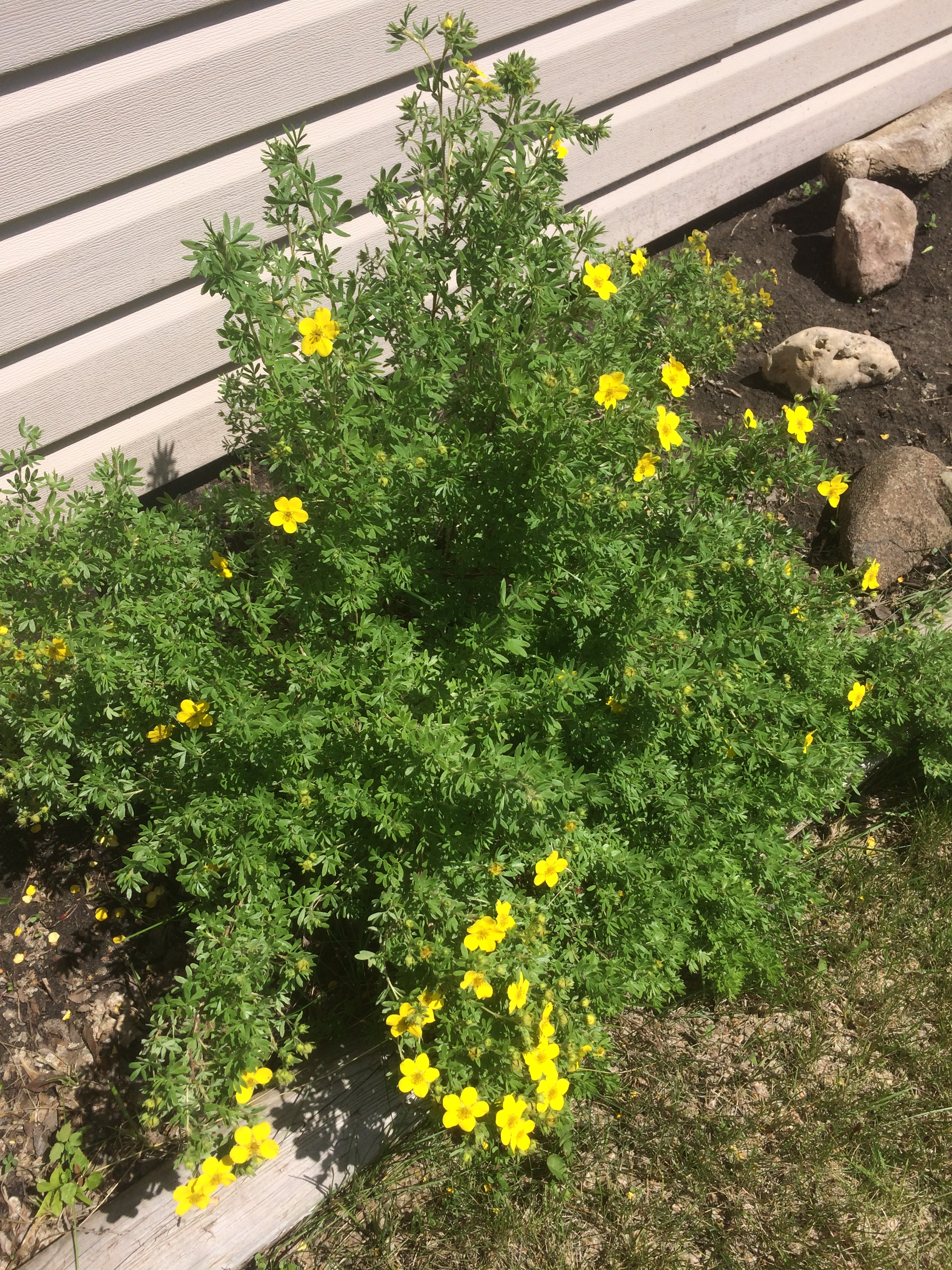
Coronation triumph potentilla

Walker married Violet Maude Fotheringham, a school teacher originally from near Baring, Saskatchewan, on 11 June 1929 in Grenfell, Saskatchewan. The couple moved to Winnipeg, Manitoba that same year where their two sons were later born: James Spence Walker (15 September 1930), and Edwin John Walker (1 May 1932).

== Career history ==
1926 to 1929 – Assistant Superintendent in charge of Horticulture, Dominion Experimental Farm, Indian Head, Saskatchewan

1929 to 1937 – Extension Horticulturist, Manitoba Department of Agriculture, Winnipeg, Manitoba

1937 to 1942 – Assistant Professor of Horticulture, University of Manitoba, Winnipeg, Manitoba

1942 to 1958 – Superintendent, Forest Nursery Station (later known as PFRA Tree Nursery and AAFC Shelterbelt Centre), Indian Head, Saskatchewan

1958 to 1968 – Research Associate Professor, University of Manitoba, Winnipeg, Manitoba

== Awards ==
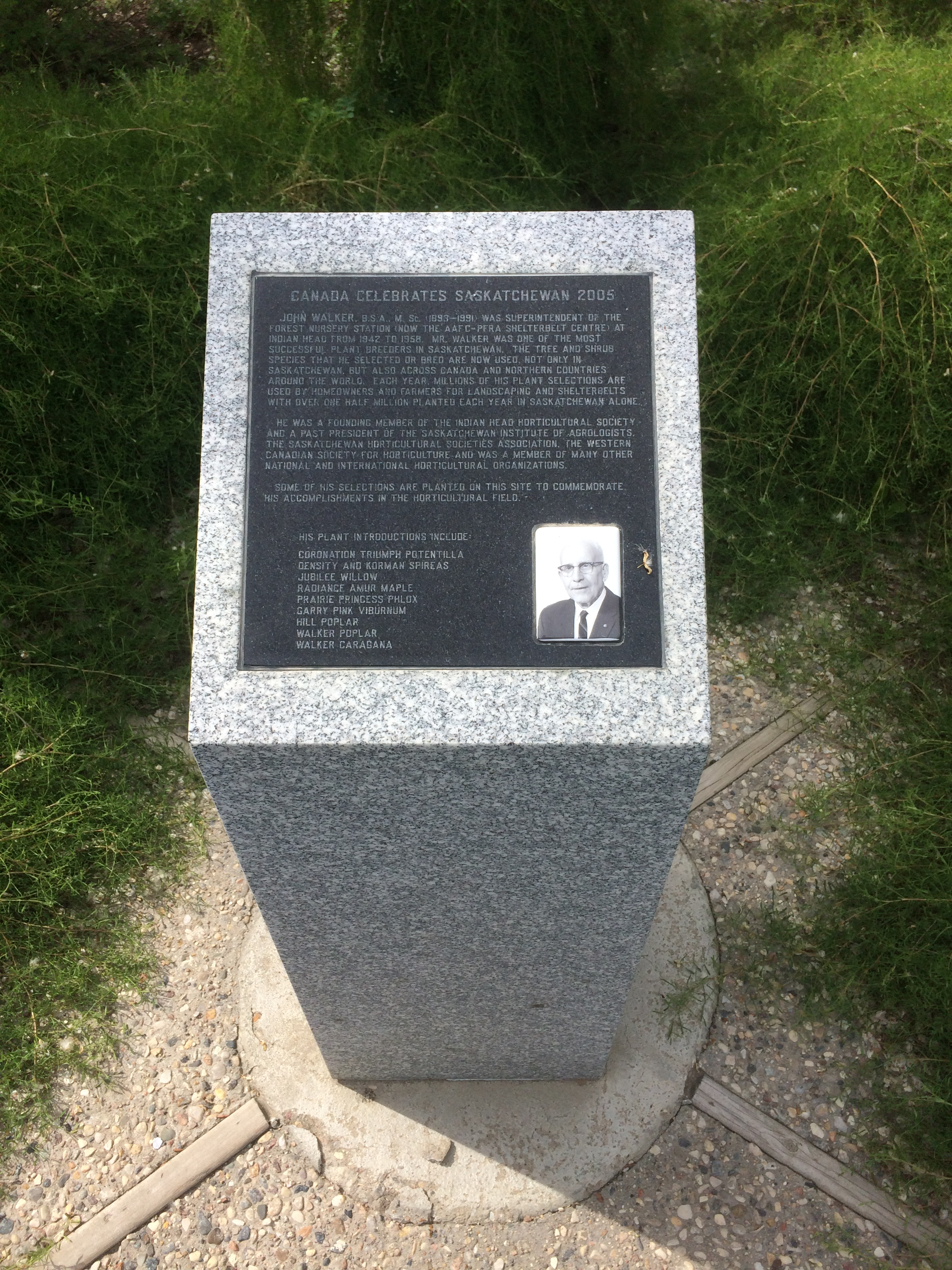
Cairn commemorating John Walker's contributions to horticulture located at Indian Head, Saskatchewan. Note: Walker caragana in background.

- Honorary Life memberships in the following organizations:
  - Winnipeg Horticultural Society (1944)
  - Saskatchewan Horticultural Societies Association (1958)
  - Indian Head Horticultural Society (1957)
  - Western Canadian Society for Horticulture (1960)
  - Manitoba Horticultural Association (1967)
  - Canadian Society for Horticultural Science (1969)
  - Manitoba Institute of Agrologists (1971)
- Fellowship – Agricultural Institute of Canada (1972)
- Award of Merit - Western Canadian Society for Horticulture for:
  - Coronation Triumph Potentilla (1967)
  - Walker Caragana (1977)
- A. P. Stevenson Commemorative Award (1977)
- Named as an important farm shelterbelt tree after retirement in 1958
  - Walker Poplar

== Service to profession ==
- Member, Agricultural Institute of Canada – over 50 years
- Director, Saskatchewan Horticultural Societies Association, 1942 to 1957, and past president
- Charter member and past president, Saskatchewan Institute of Agrologists
- Charter member and past president, Western Canadian Society for Horticulture
- Member, American Society for Horticultural Science, and past chairman (Great Plains region)
- Member, Canadian Society for Horticultural Science
