= Walter Jack =

Scottish footballer

Personal information
- Full name: Walter Robert Jack
- Date of birth: 17 November 1874
- Place of birth: Grangemouth, Scotland
- Date of death: May 1936 (aged 61)
- Position: Centre-forward

Senior career*
Years	Team	Apps	(Gls)
1902–1904	Bristol Rovers		
1904–1905	West Bromwich Albion		

Managerial career
- 1905–1909: Clyde
- * Club domestic league appearances and goals

Walter Robert Jack (17 November 1874 – May 1936) was a Scottish footballer who played as a centre-forward.

== Biography ==
Jack was born in Grangemouth. He first moved to England in April 1902, when he joined Bristol Rovers. He signed for West Bromwich Albion in May 1904, and was their top scorer in 1904–05, his only season with the club. Jack managed Clyde from July 1905 to May 1909. He died in May 1936.
