= Tommy McGrane Memorial Cup =

- Sport: Football
- Founded: 2005
- No. of teams: 4
- Country: Scotland
- Most recent champion: East Kilbride Thistle
- Most titles: East Kilbride Thistle (4 titles)

The Tommy McGrane Memorial Cup is an annual pre-season invitational Scottish football tournament hosted by SJFA, West Region junior football club East Kilbride Thistle.

== Tournament ==
The trophy was named in honour of Tommy McGrane, who was one of the founders of East Kilbride Thistle. The tournament has always been at the Show Park, in the Village, East Kilbride, since it began in 2005. The tournament is played in a straight knockout format of two semi-finals and a final. The semi-final losers play in a third-fourth play-off match. The tournament used to regularly attract SFL clubs, with teams such as Clyde, Hamilton Academical and, in particular, Stirling Albion taking part in previous years.

Thistle only won their own tournament for the first time in 2009, at the fifth attempt of trying. The Tommy McGrane Cup trophy suffered severe damage in May 2012, after the club's trophy cabinet was smashed up, with various other items suffering damage, during a fire that broke out at Thistle's Social Club, which resided next to the stadium. A new trophy has since been made and presented to the winners of the tournament.

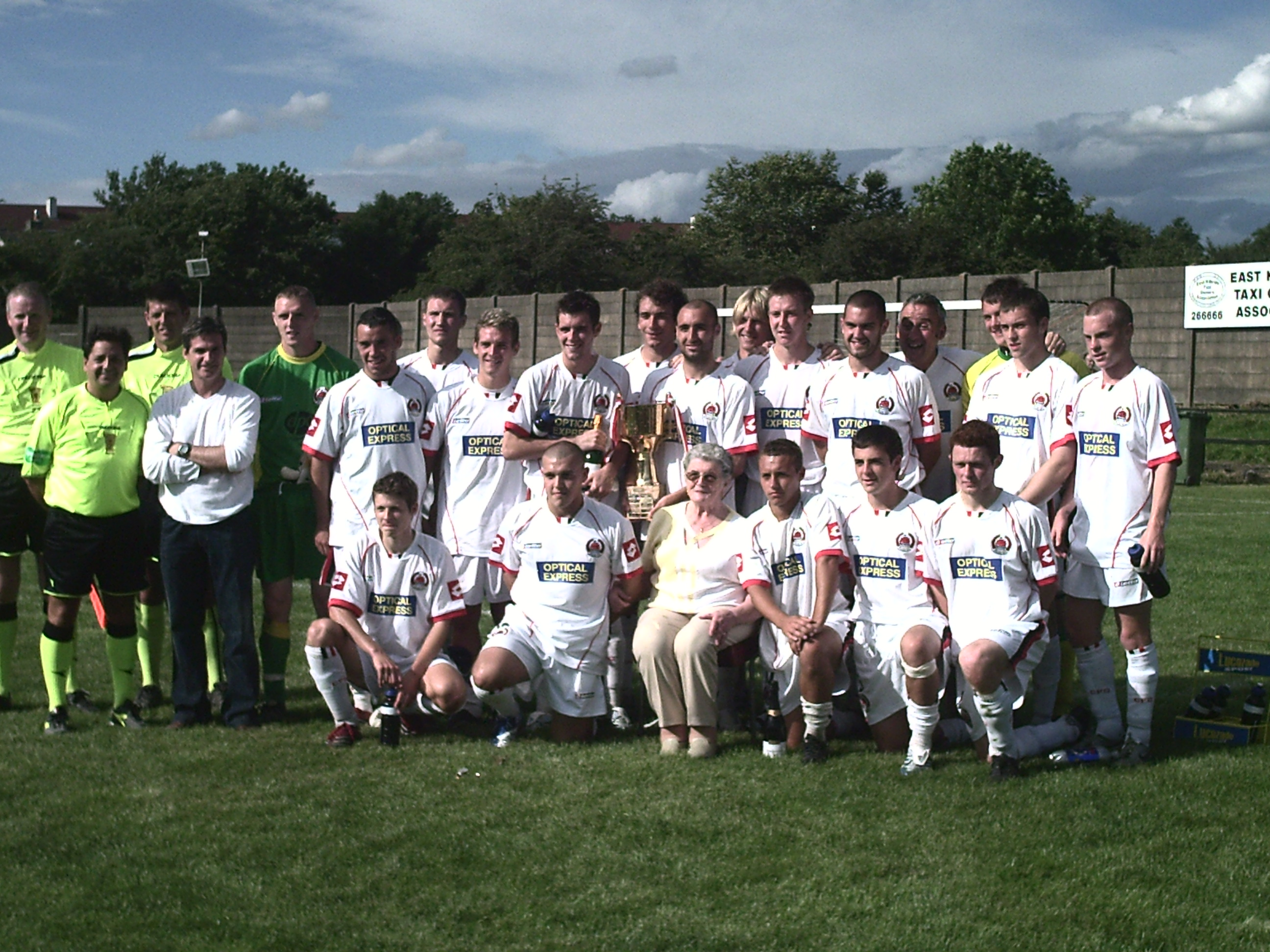
Clyde lift the Tommy McGrane Cup in 2006, with a 4–0 win against hosts East Kilbride Thistle in the final.

Year	Winners	Runners-up	Third place	Fourth place	Ref
2005	Stirling Albion (1/3)	East Kilbride Thistle			
2006	Clyde	Auchinleck Talbot	East Kilbride Thistle	Stirling Albion	
2007	Stirling Albion (2/3)	East Kilbride Thistle	Hamilton Accies	Arthurlie	
2008	Stirling Albion (3/3)	East Kilbride Thistle	Preston Athletic	Glenafton Athletic	
2009	East Kilbride Thistle (1/2)	Alloa Athletic	Petershill	Ayr United U19s	
2010	Beith Juniors	East Kilbride Thistle	Eddlewood Amateurs	Yoker Athletic	
2011					
2012					
2013					
2014	Clyde U20s	East Kilbride Thistle	East Kilbride AFC	Rolls Royce AFC	
2015	East Kilbride Thistle (2/4)	Clyde U20s			
2016	East Kilbride Thistle (3/4)	Stranraer U20s			
2017	East Kilbride Thistle (4/4)	St. Anthony's			
2018					
