= John Walker (antiquary) =

English antiquarian

- Born: 18 February 1770
- Died: 5 April 1831 (aged 61); Essex
- Occupation: Antiquarian

John Walker (18 February 1770 – 5 April 1831) was an English antiquarian.

== Biography ==
Walker was the son of John Walker of London, was baptised at the church of St. Katherine Cree on 18 February 1770, and was elected scholar at Winchester in 1783. He matriculated from Brasenose College on 14 Jan. 1788, graduating B.C.L. in 1797. In the same year he was elected fellow of New College, retaining his fellowship till 1820. He also filled the posts of librarian and of dean of canon law. In 1809, he published a Selection of Curious Articles from the Gentleman's Magazine (London, 8vo) in three volumes. This undertaking had been suggested by Gibbon to the editor, John Nichols, some time before, but Nichols could not find leisure for the task (Nichols, Lit. Anecd. viii. 557; Lit. Illustr. vol. viii. p. xi). The venture was successful; a thousand copies sold in a few months. A second edition, with an additional volume, appeared in 1811; and a third, also in four volumes, in 1814.

Walker made valuable researches in the archives of the Bodleian Library and of other university collections. In 1809 he brought out Oxoniana (London, 4 vols. 12mo), consisting of selections from books and manuscripts in the Bodleian relating to university matters. This was followed in 1813 by Letters written by Eminent Persons, from the Originals in the Bodleian Library and Ashmolean Museum (London, 2 vols. 8vo). Both are works of value, and have been largely used by succeeding writers. Walker was one of the original proprietors of the Oxford Herald, and for several years assisted in the editorial work.

In 1819, Walker was presented by the warden and fellows of New College to the vicarage of Hornchurch in Essex, and resided there during the rest of his life. He died at the vicarage on 5 April 1831.

Besides the works mentioned, he was the author of Curia Oxoniensis; or Observations on the Statutes which relate to the University Court (3rd edit. Oxford, 1826, 8vo). He was the first editor of the Oxford University Calendar, first published in 1810. An auction catalogue of his library was published in 1831 (London, 8vo).
