= 50th Battalion (Calgary), CEF =

50th Battalion, CEF
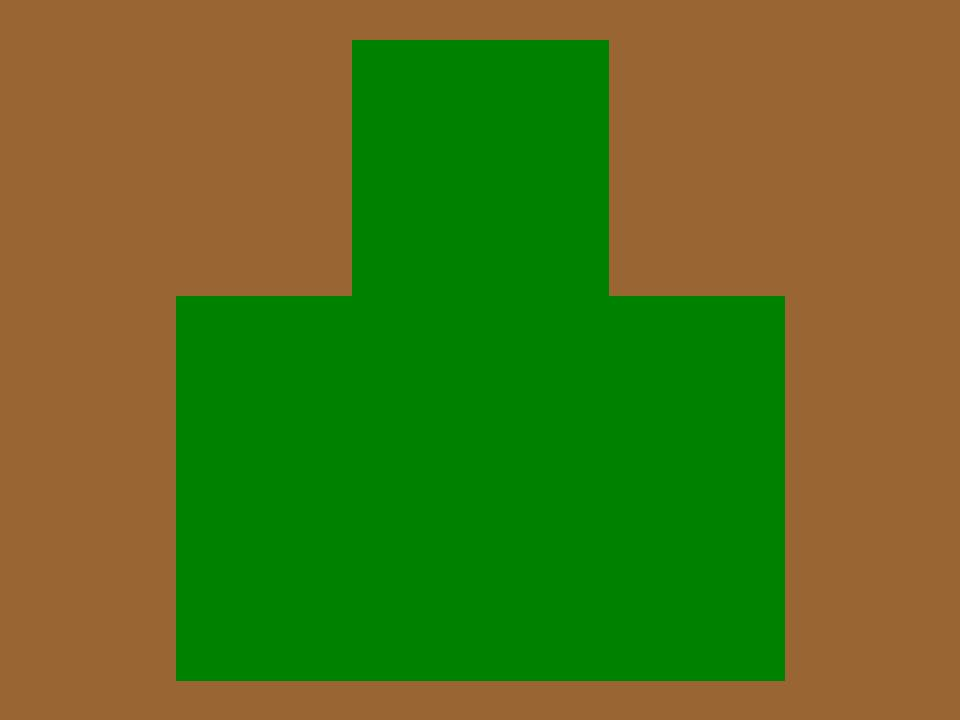
- 50th Calgary Battalion patch
- Active: November 7, 1914 – August 30, 1920
- Country: Canada
- Branch: Canadian Expeditionary Force
- Type: Line infantry
- Role: Infantry
- Size: 1 battalion (500–1,000 men)
- Part of: British Expeditionary Force; Canadian Corps; 4th Division; 10th Canadian Infantry Brigade
- Garrison/HQ: Calgary
- Nickname: Mason's Man-Eaters
- Colors: Oxford blue over Cambridge blue
- March: "A Hundred Pipers"
- Engagements: World War I: 1916; Battle of Ancre Heights; Battle of the Somme; 1917; Battle of Vimy Ridge; Battle of Lens; Battle of Passchendaele; 1918; Battle of Amiens; Second Battle of the Somme; Battle of Cambrai; Battle of the Drocourt-Quéant Line; Battle of the Canal du Nord; Battle of Valenciennes
- Battle honours: Somme, 1916; Ancre Heights; Ancre, 1916; Arras, 1917, '18; Vimy, 1917; Hill 70; Ypres, 1917; Passchendaele; Amiens; Scarpe, 1918; Drocourt-Quéant Line; Hindenburg Line; Canal du Nord; Valenciennes; France and Flanders, 1916–18

Commanders
- Current commander: N/A

The 50th Battalion (Calgary), CEF, was an infantry battalion of the Canadian Expeditionary Force during the Great War. The 50th Battalion was authorized on 7 November 1914 and embarked for Britain on 27 October 1915. The battalion disembarked in France on 11 August 1916, where it fought as part of the 10th Canadian Infantry Brigade, 4th Canadian Division, in France and Flanders until the end of the war. The battalion was disbanded on 30 August 1920.

The 50th Battalion recruited in and was mobilized at Calgary, Alberta.

== Commanding Officers ==
The 50th Battalion had four commanding officers:

- Lieutenant-Colonel E.G. Mason, 27 October 1915 – 11 November 1916
- Major R.B. Eaton, 11 November 1916 – 1 January 1917
- Major C.B. Worsnop, DSO, 1 January 1917 – 11 March 1917
- Lieutenant-Colonel Lionel Frank Page, DSO, 11 March 1917 – demobilization

== Victoria Cross ==
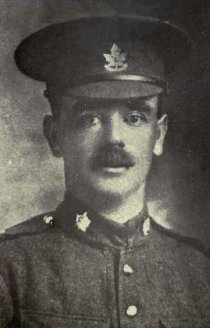
Pte John George Pattison, VC, of the 50th Battalion (Calgary), CEF.

One member of the 50th Battalion was awarded the Victoria Cross. Private John George Pattison was awarded the medal for his actions on 10 April 1917 during the Battle of Vimy Ridge. He was subsequently killed in action at Lens, France, on 3 June 1917.

== Operational history ==
=== 1916 ===
==== Ancre Heights/Somme ====
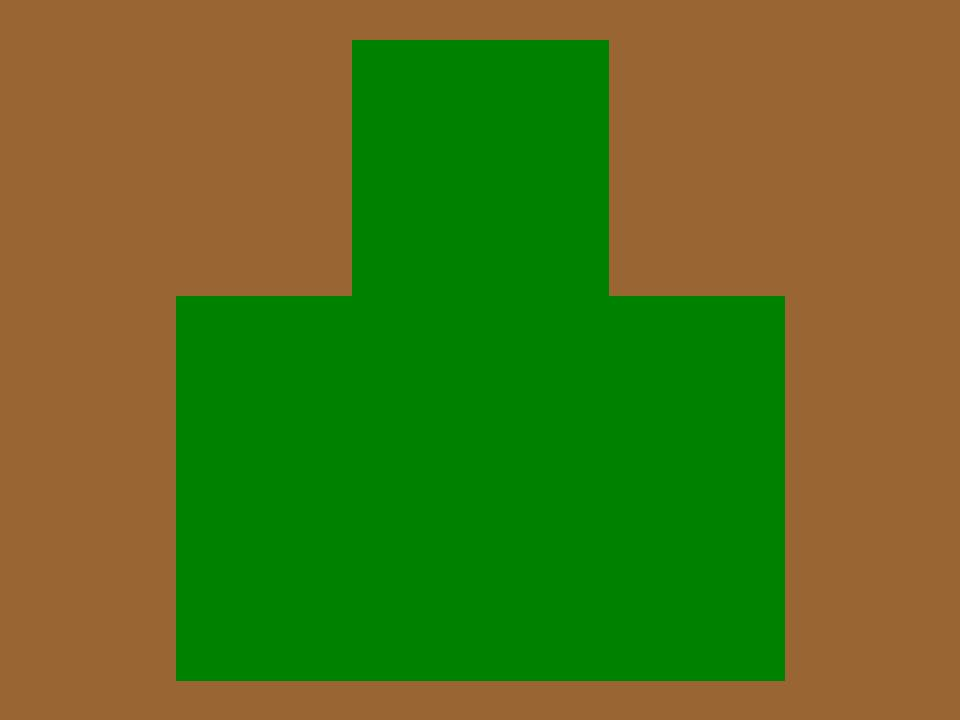
The distinguishing patch of the 50th Battalion (Calgary), CEF.

The battalion was ordered to Ancre Heights in October. Ancre Heights was the scene of Canada's first involvement in the Battle of the Somme, which had begun on July 1 and which ultimately resulted in 25,000 Canadian casualties. Later, the 50th was ordered into the fighting and during the battle, the 50th Battalion's non-commissioned officers (NCOs) suffered heavily. Positioned in the second wave, they were killed by hidden German machine-gun posts that had been bypassed by the initial assault.

=== 1917 ===
==== Vimy Ridge ====
From the Somme, the battalion was moved northward to Artois in November 1916, where they spent their winter and Christmas preparing for the offensive against Vimy Ridge. From January to March, the 4th Division's artillery provided part of the pre-battle barrage. In March, the Canadian Corps changed the commander of the battalion, as Colonel E.G. Mason was transferred to another battalion and replaced Lieutenant-Colonel Page. In April, the Canadians made their three-day offensive, starting the Battle of Vimy Ridge.

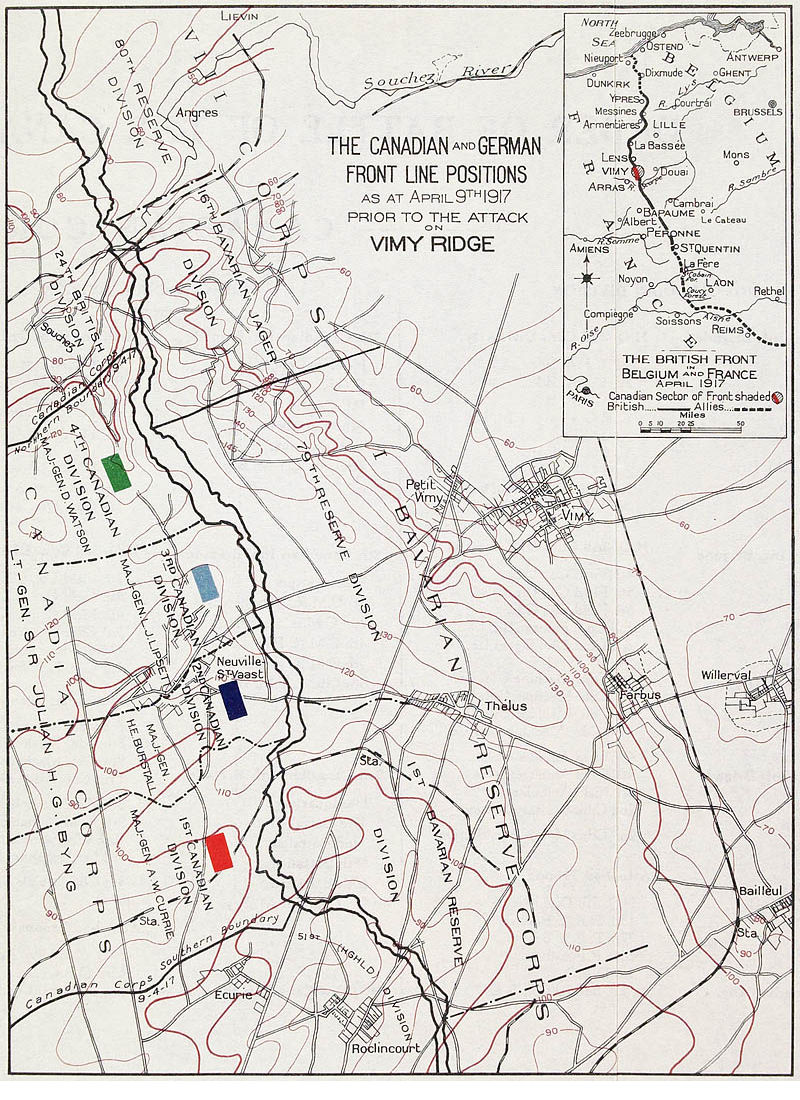
The 50th Battalion, with the 4th Division was attacking from the north of the ridge and were facing the 16th Bavarian Jäger Division and the 79th Reserve Division

The 50th Battalion and the rest of the 4th Canadian Division were assigned to attack Hill 145. After many attempts to capture the hill, they finally managed to take it from the Bavarian Reserve force. For the next two days, the 4th Canadian Division and 50th Battalion tried to attack the little knoll known as the Pimple. Finally, the Bavarians, low on food and having suffered many casualties, surrendered the Pimple and retreated from Vimy. The 50th, having suffered heavy casualties, were taken out of the line and rested for a while.

==== Lens and Passchendaele ====
After Vimy the 50th Battalion, with the rest of the Canadian Corps, started preparations for the Battle of Hill 70. They fought the Germans in the streets of Lens and in the generating plant, which a group of Germans had fortified. After a hard-fought battle there, the Canadians gained a reputation as elite or storm troops. During this battle, they were taken out of the line for a little bit, and put into billets. They stayed with French families in their remaining small houses.

Field Marshal Sir Douglas Haig then ordered them into the heavy fighting at Liévin and Hill 65 in June and July 1917. After suffering low casualty rates, the Canadians were ordered to one of the costliest battles in the war, the Third Battle of Ypres. The Canadians suffered 16,000 dead and many more wounded, while 50th Battalion lost a quarter of their fighting men. The Canadian Corps was successful, however, capturing the village of Passchendaele. After the battle at Passchendaele, the Canadians finally got a break and they had Christmas dinner at Château de la Haie. During the initial stages of the German spring offensive that was launched in early 1918, the 50th Battalion, along with the other Canadian units, was out of the line conducting training and, as a result, missed the heaviest part of the fighting.

=== 1918 ===
==== Kaiser's Battle ====
During this German offensive, dedicated to the German Kaiser, the Germans managed to penetrate the Allied front lines and push them back almost all the way to Paris, but the Allies took advantage of the barrier provided by the Marne River situated just outside Paris, where they subsequently managed to halt the German advance. The Germans, wasted after having to sacrifice a large number of their troops during the offensive, could not withstand the strong Allied push that followed and which ultimately brought about an end to the war.

=== Llandovery Castle operations ===
In 1918, a Canadian medical ship, HMHS Llandovery Castle was sunk by a German U-boat, even though Llandovery Castle had a white flag put up. The Canadians, furious with the Germans, started an offensive dedicated to Llandovery Castle. The 50th fought in Llandovery Castle operations, during which they managed to liberate a few towns and villages.

==== Canada's Hundred Days ====
The German advance to Paris was halted by the Second Battle of the Marne. After years of stalemate on the Western Front, the war was finally coming to an end. In the last 100 days, the 50th Battalion fought at the Battle of Amiens on August 8–10; the Second Battle of the Somme (1918), which was also known as the Battle of Arras; the Battle of Cambrai, where they helped recapture Cambrai and hold it against German attacks; the battle of Drocourt-Quéant where the 50th Battalion helped to defeat the German defensive line; the Battle of the Canal du Nord, where the Canadian Corps, with 50th Battalion crossed the canal; and the Battle of Valenciennes, one of the last battles of the war, where Mons was captured. By then, the Germans were retreating from France and Belgium. On November 11, on the eleventh hour, the Germans agreed to an armistice, ending the First World War.

== Perpetuation ==
The 50th Battalion (Calgary), CEF, returned to Calgary in 1919 under the command of Lieutenant-Colonel Lionel Page, who actively sought to have the battalion remain as a formed unit of the post-war Militia. On 15 March 1920, as part of the Otter Committee post-war reorganizations of the Canadian Militia, the 103rd Regiment (Calgary Rifles) was reorganized to become The Calgary Regiment. The 50th was perpetuated by the 1st Battalion, The Calgary Regiment. On 18 March 1921 the 1st Battalion, The Calgary Regiment, had its lineage officially changed to dually perpetuate the 10th Battalion, CEF, along with the Winnipeg Light Infantry. Perpetuation of the 50th Battalion passed to the 2nd Battalion, The Calgary Regiment. On 15 May 1924 the two battalions were split into separate regiments, The Calgary Highlanders (perpetuating the 10th, 56th and 82nd Battalions, CEF), and The Calgary Regiment (perpetuating the 50th, 89th and 137th Battalions, CEF).

Today the 50th Battalion is perpetuated by The King's Own Calgary Regiment (RCAC).

== Battle honours ==
The 50th Battalion was awarded the following battle honours:

- SOMME, 1916
- Ancre Heights
- Ancre, 1916
- Vimy, 1917
- HILL 70
- Ypres 1917
- Passchendaele
- AMIENS
- Scarpe '18
- Drocourt-Quéant
- HINDENBURG LINE
- Canal du Nord
- VALENCIENNES
- FRANCE AND FLANDERS, 1916-18

== Historical accounts ==
Historical accounts include The Ross Playfair Letters Project and a battalion history published by Victor W. Wheeler.

== Notable 50th Battalion men ==
- Lieutenant-Colonel E.G. Mason (commanding officer)
- Lieutenant-Colonel Lionel Page (commanding officer)
- Lieutenant Joseph Emmett Stauffer
- Sergeant Edward Staves, Military Medal
- Private "Ducky" Henry Norwest (Sniper)
- Private John George Pattison, VC
- Private Victor Wheeler (Signaller)
- Lieutenant John Walker (horticulturist)

== Memorials ==
Soldiers of the 50th Battalion that went missing in action are memorialized on the Menin Gate and the Vimy Memorial. Soldiers of the battalion killed in action are commemorated on the Calgary Soldiers' Memorial, dedicated in April 2011. There is also a bridge over the Elbow River in Calgary named after John George Pattison, VC.

== Engagements ==
=== Training, 1914–1916 ===
- Formation to August 1916: training in various places in Canada, Great Britain and France

=== Somme Front, 1916 ===
- October 1 – November 11, 1916: the Battle of Ancre Heights
- July 1 – November 18, 1916: the Battle of the Somme

=== Vimy Front, 1917 ===
- January–April, 1917: preparation for The Battle of Vimy Ridge
- April 9–12, 1917: the Battle of Vimy Ridge

=== Lens Front, 1917 ===
- August 15–25: attack on Hill 70

=== Ypres Front, 1917 ===
- July 31 – November 10, 1917: Third Battle of Ypres or the Battle of Passchendaele

=== Training, 1917–1918 ===
- December 1917: Christmas at Château de la Haie
- January–July 1918: training in France

=== Hundred Days' Offensive, 1918 ===
- August 8–11, 1918: the Battle of Amiens
- August 21 – September 2, 1918: the Second Battle of the Somme
- September 27 – October 1, 1918: the Battle of Canal du Nord
- October 8–10, 1918: the Battle of Cambrai
- November 11, 1918: the Battle of Valenciennes (also known as the Capture of Mons)

== See also ==
- The Calgary Tigers football team was renamed Calgary 50th Battalion for the 1923 and 1924 seasons in the Alberta Rugby Football Union to commemorate the battalion.
- List of infantry battalions in the Canadian Expeditionary Force
