= John Walker (cricketer, born 1854) =

English cricketer

John Walker (1854 – unknown) was an English first-class cricketer active 1874–81 who played for Middlesex. He was born in Harrow.
