= John Walker (philatelist) =

British philatelist, born 1855

- Born: 1855
- Died: 1927 (aged 71–72)
- Occupation: Philatelist

John Walker (1855–1927) was a British philatelist who signed the Roll of Distinguished Philatelists in 1921.
