= Johnnie Walker (disambiguation) =

Johnnie Walker is a brand of whisky produced in Scotland.

Johnnie, Johnny, or Jonny Walker may also refer to:

== People ==
=== Entertainment ===
- Johnnie Walker (actor) (1894–1949), American actor appeared in silent and sound films
- Johnny Walker (Indian actor) (1926–2003), Indian actor and comedian in Hindi cinema
- Johnny "Big Moose" Walker (1927–1999), American electric blues pianist and organist
- Johnnie Walker (DJ) (1945–2024), British radio disc jockey
- Johnny Walker (DJ) (1948–2004), American radio disc jockey, real name James Embry
- Johnny Walker, rock musician in the Soledad Brothers

=== Military ===
- Frederic John Walker (1896–1944), nicknamed "Johnnie" after the whisky, British Royal Navy officer during the Second World War
- John Anthony Walker (1937–2014), former US Navy Warrant Officer convicted of spying for the Soviets

=== Sports ===
==== Football (all forms) ====
- Johnny Walker (Australian footballer) (1908–1980), Australian rules footballer
- Johnny Walker (footballer, born 1928) (1928–2019), Scottish professional footballer who played for Wolverhampton Wanderers, Southampton and Reading
- Johnny Walker (footballer, born 1973), Scottish professional footballer who played for Clydebank, Grimsby, Mansfield and Hamilton Academical
- Jonny Walker (soccer) (born 1974), American soccer goalkeeper
- Johnny Walker Jr. (born 2001), American football linebacker

==== Other sports ====
- Johnny Walker (fighter) (born 1992), Brazilian MMA Fighter
- Jonny Walker (boxer) (1819–1888), English bare-knuckle boxer
- Johnny Walker (baseball) (1896–1976), American baseball infielder
- John "Johnny" Walker (1934–2020), American professional wrestler better known as Mr. Wrestling II
- Johnnie Walker (cyclist) (born 1987), Australian cyclist
- Jonny Walker (motorcyclist) (born 1991), English motorcycle rider
- Johnnie Walker (racing driver) (1944–2024), Australian racing driver

=== Other people ===
- John Walker (grocer) (1805–1857), known as Johnnie, Scottish grocer and originator of Johnnie Walker Scotch
- E. S. Johnny Walker (1911–2000), U.S. Representative from New Mexico
- Killing of Juan Jumalon (1966–2023), about the death of a broadcaster who was also known as "Johnny Walker"

== Other uses ==
- Johnnie Walker, a fictional character in the novel Kafka on the Shore (2002) by Haruki Murakami
- Johnny Walker, the character played by Mickey Rourke in the film Homeboy (1988)
- Johnny Walker, a 1957 Indian Hindi-language film starring Johnny Walker
- Johnnie Walker (film), a 1992 Indian Malayalam-language film starring Mammooty
- Johnny Walker (bomb), a Second World War anti-shipping "hunting" bomb
- A nickname given to Pope John XXIII by media outlets due to John's propensity to slip out of the Vatican at night to explore Rome

== See also ==
- John Walker (disambiguation)
- Jonathan Walker (disambiguation)
