= Stan Anderson (Australian footballer) =

Australian rules footballer

Personal information
- Full name: Richard Stanley Anderson
- Nickname: Plugger
- Born: 26 July 1893; Queenscliff, Victoria
- Died: 15 August 1953 (aged 60); Middle Park, Victoria
- Original team: Williamstown
- Height: 178 cm (5 ft 10 in)
- Weight: 77 kg (170 lb)

Playing career^{1}
Years	Club	Games (Goals)
1919	Essendon	1 (0)
- ^{1} Playing statistics correct to the end of 1919.

Richard Stanley Anderson (26 July 1893 – 15 August 1953) was an Australian rules footballer who played with the Williamstown Football Club in the Victorian Football Association (VFA) and with Essendon in the Victorian Football League (VFL).

== Family ==
The son of Robert Anderson (1855-1939), and Sarah Ann Anderson (1869-1955), née Hutchins (later Mrs. Peter Stephens), Richard Stanley Anderson was born at Queenscliff, Victoria on 26 July 1893.

He married Doris Elizabeth Ryan (1891-1969) in 1938.

== Military service ==
He served in the First AIF, suffering severe shell shock after being buried alive in an explosion in France in August 1916. He spent 128 days in hospital but later returned to active service before being discharged in April 1917.

== Football ==
=== Williamstown (VFA) ===
He played 45 games (scoring 2 goals) for the Williamstown Football Club over three seasons (1913 to 1915).

=== Essendon VFL ===
His only senior match for the Essendon Football Club, was against Fitzroy, at the Brunswick Street Oval on 17 May 1919.

=== Williamstown (VFA) ===
He was cleared from Essendon to the Williamstown Football Club in June 1919, and went on to play a further 24 senior games (scoring 2 goals) over three seasons (1919 to 1921).

== Death ==
He died at Middle Park, Victoria on 15 August 1953.
