= Stuart Millar =

Scottish footballer (born 1965)

Personal information
- Date of birth: 16 May 1965 (age 61)
- Place of birth: Bellshill, Scotland
- Position: Winger

Youth career
- Celtic Boys Club 1977-1980

Senior career*
Years	Team	Apps	(Gls)
1981–1984	Airdrieonians	30	(1)
1984–1985	Dundee	0	(0)
1985–1986	Montrose	36	(12)
1986–1990	Clyde	94	(18)
1990	Alloa Athletic	11	(0)
1990–1992	Dumbarton	32	(2)
1992–1993	Evagoras Paphos	38	(19)
- Kilsyth Rangers
Total		241	(46)

Managerial career
- 1995–1998: Carluke Rovers
- 1998–2003: Cumbernauld United
- 2010–2011: Clyde
- 2015–2017: Dumbarton (chief scout)
- 2024–2026: Ross County (chief scout)
- * Club domestic league appearances and goals

Stuart Millar (born 16 May 1965), is a Scottish former football player, manager and Scout.

== Career ==
Millar was born in Bellshill. He began his playing career with his home town club Airdrieonians, where he scored on his full debut at 17 years of age. He then joined Dundee, where he failed to make the breakthrough to the first team. He moved onto First Division club Montrose.

He then signed for Clyde, becoming Craig Brown's last signing as Clyde manager. He enjoyed the best spell of his career with Clyde, playing over 100 times for the club in four years. He then moved on to play for Alloa Athletic and Dumbarton. Stuart also had a successful spell playing in Cyprus with 1st Division club Evagoras Paphos. Whilst he was there the Cypriot club qualified for the UEFA Cup.

Following successful spells in junior football management with Carluke Rovers and Cumbernauld United, where they won four promotions, he became assistant manager at Stranraer, under Neil Watt. They were at Stair Park from 2003 until 2006. Highlights included winning the Third Division title in their first season, followed by a further successive promotion from the Second Division to the First Division. A record of their time at Stair Park is in Stuart's charity book - Stranraer FC - "The Neil Watt Years", which was published in 2009.

Millar was the chief scout at Ross County, a position he held from October 2007 to April 2010. Millar was appointed head coach of Clyde, but on 2 February 2011 he was sacked by Clyde.

Millar returned to his former position at Ross County in the summer of 2011. Millar resigned in the wake of manager Derek Adams and director of football George Adams being sacked. He was appointed to a scouting position with West Bromwich Albion in October 2014. He joined Dumbarton as chief scout in 2015, before leaving the club two years later to join Stranraer as head of recruitment. Millar then took up the position of Director of Football from April 2018 to March 2019 and was Director of Football at Airdrieonians until February 2021.

He became a scout at Bradford City in September 2021. Millar returned to Airdrieonians as a Club Ambassador and stayed there until January 2024, subsequently returning once again to Ross County as Chief Scout (Scotland).
