= Jack Walker (association footballer) =

English footballer

Personal information
- Full name: John Walker
- Date of birth: 1882
- Place of birth: Gornal, Dudley, England
- Date of death: 1960 (aged 77–78)
- Position: Left half

Senior career*
Years	Team	Apps	(Gls)
- Toll End
- Tipton Excelsior
- Coseley Town
1903–1904	Wolverhampton Wanderers	2	(0)
- Dudley Old Edwardians
- * Club domestic league appearances and goals

Jack Walker (1882–1960) was an English footballer who played in the Football League for Wolverhampton Wanderers.

== Career ==
Walker played for a series of local non-league clubs before earning a move to Football League side Wolverhampton Wanderers in August 1903. He made his Football League on 14 November 1903 in a 0–2 defeat at Aston Villa. He made only one further first team appearance for the club, in a goalless draw at Stoke on 4 April 1904.
