= John Walker (Grimsby Town footballer) =

Scottish footballer

Personal information
- Place of birth: Scotland
- Position: Centre-half

Senior career*
Years	Team	Apps	(Gls)
1888–1890	Vale of Leven		
1890–1893	Grimsby Town	13	(0)
1893	Gainsborough Trinity		
1893–1894	Everton	3	(1)
- * Club domestic league appearances and goals

John Walker was a Scottish professional footballer who played as a centre-half.
