= The Prairie Garden Magazine =

Gardening annual

The Prairie Garden is a digest-sized, soft-covered book published annually since 1937 dedicated to the advancement of horticulture in the Prairies of southern Canada and the northern United States. The work is organized by the editor, an annual guest editor and a volunteer committee consisting of 12-15 members.

Known originally as The Winnipeg Flower Garden. In 1955 the magazine was renamed The Flower Garden. In 1957 it was changed to The Prairie Garden. It is composed primarily of articles submitted by horticulturalists revolving around an annual theme.

The Prairie Garden is published by The Prairie Garden Committee, a non-profit organization based out of Manitoba, Canada. The magazine has its headquarters in Winnipeg, Manitoba.

Each year, a theme is selected from which a large portion of the articles follow. The theme articles are the responsibility of the guest editor, who is chosen because of his or her knowledge in the chosen subject area. The books are edited in part and as a whole by The Prairie Garden Committee, before being published each year in time for Christmas. Members of the committee often write articles for the book as well as provide images, aside from their role as associate editors.
