= Jim Rowan =

Scottish footballer (1935–2015)

Personal information
- Full name: James Trainer Rowan
- Date of birth: 27 July 1935
- Place of birth: Glasgow, Scotland
- Date of death: 21 June 2015 (aged 79)
- Position: Inside forward

Youth career
- Shettleston

Senior career*
| Years | Team | Apps | (Gls) |
| 1954–1956 | Celtic | 2 | (1) |
| 1956 | → Stirling Albion (loan) | 18 | (2) |
| 1956–1959 | Clyde | 9 | (1) |
| 1959–1960 | Dunfermline Athletic | 8 | (4) |
| 1960–1962 | Stirling Albion | 65 | (4) |
| 1962–1965 | Airdrieonians | 87 | (27) |
| 1965–1969 | Falkirk | 46 | (2) |
| 1969–1970 | Partick Thistle | 9 | (0) |
| Total | | 244 | (41) |

Managerial career
- 1968: Falkirk (caretaker)
- 1970–1971: East Stirlingshire
- 1973: Clyde (caretaker)
- * Club domestic league appearances and goals

James Trainer Rowan (27 July 1935 – 21 June 2015) was a Scottish footballer and manager.
