= John James Walker =

British mathematician

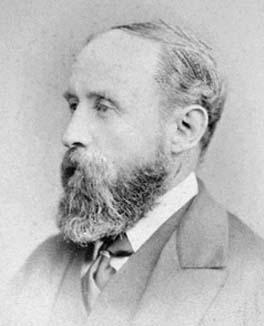
- Born: 2 October 1825; Kennington, England
- Died: 15 February 1900 (aged 74); Hampstead, England
- Education: Trinity College Dublin (BA, MA)
- Awards: Fellow of the Royal Society (1883)
- Scientific career
- Fields: Mathematics
- Workplaces: University College London

John James Walker FRS (1825–1900) was an English mathematician. He was the president of the London Mathematical Society from 1888 to 1890.

== Life and work ==
His father was headmaster in the schools where he studied: London High School and Plymouth New Grammar School. As his family was of Irish descent, he went to study mathematics and physics to Trinity College Dublin where he graduated in 1846 and mastered in 1857.

From 1853 to 1862 he was private tutor of the rich family Guinness, the most famous brewers of Ireland. In 1865 he returned to London and he was appointed professor on applied mathematics at University College London. In 1883 he was elected fellow of the Royal Society. In 1888 he retired from the academy and he devoted to original research the rest of his live.

His original research was mainly in higher algebra (analysis of plane curves) and in quaternions (considered as the best instrument of research).

== Bibliography ==
- S., R. (1904). "Obituary". Proceedings of the Royal Society. 75: 93–95. doi:10.1098/rspl.1904.0163. ISSN 0370-1662.
