= Stan Anderson (Scottish footballer) =

Scottish footballer and manager

Personal information
- Full name: Alexander Anderson
- Date of birth: 22 June 1939
- Place of birth: Craigneuk, Scotland
- Date of death: 3 December 1997 (aged 58)
- Position: Wing half

Youth career
- Lesmahagow

Senior career*
Years	Team	Apps	(Gls)
1957–1959	Hamilton Academical	72	(25)
1959–1961	Rangers	1	(0)
1961–1962	Hamilton Academical	34	(2)
1962–1963	Queen of the South	33	(4)
1963–1966	Hamilton Academical	103	(16)
1966–1970	Clyde	116	(10)
Total		359	(57)

Managerial career
- 1973–1976: Clyde
- * Club domestic league appearances and goals

Stan Anderson (22 June 1939 – 3 December 1997) was a Scottish football player and manager.

Anderson was born in Craigneuk, Scotland. He started his career in 1957 at Hamilton Academical. He moved to Rangers two years later but was unable to break into the senior team, making only one appearance for the club during a 1-4 defeat by Clyde on 27 April 1960. A return to Accies followed in 1961 then a season with Queen of the South before a final spell with Hamilton. In 1966 Anderson moved to Clyde and went on to make over one hundred appearances for the team.

After retiring in 1970, Anderson joined the Dumbarton coaching staff. He returned to Rangers as reserve-team coach under William Waddell and later Jock Wallace. In 1973, he was appointed manager of Clyde, spending three seasons in charge.
