= John Walker (footballer, born 1876) =

Scottish footballer

Personal information
- Birth name: John Walkin
- Date of birth: 20 June 1876
- Place of birth: Leith, Scotland
- Date of death: 1 August 1900 (aged 24)
- Place of death: Leith, Scotland
- Position: Outside left

Senior career*
Years	Team	Apps	(Gls)
- Leith Primrose
1898	Leith Athletic	9	(5)
1898–1899	Heart of Midlothian	6	(0)
1899–1900	Lincoln City	6	(0)
- * Club domestic league appearances and goals

John Walker (20 June 1876 – 1 August 1900) was a Scottish footballer whose position was outside left. He was possibly the first black player to play in both the Scottish Football League and the English Football League, featuring for Leith Athletic and Heart of Midlothian for brief spells in his home country, followed by another short period with Lincoln City in England before returning due to ill health.

== Career ==
Born in Leith, Walker began his playing career with local Junior team Leith Primrose, moving on to second-tier SFL club Leith Athletic in March 1898. His performances at the end of the 1897–98 season and the outset of 1898–99 drew the attention of Heart of Midlothian, and he signed for the Tynecastle club in October 1898 for a fee quoted as £50 or £80. He made six Division One appearances for Hearts and featured in an East of Scotland Shield win over local rivals Hibernian, but his overall form did not impress the hierarchy and he was allowed to leave the club at the end of the season.

Walker joined Lincoln City of the English Football League Second Division for the 1899–1900 season and made six league appearances for the Imps during the first half of the campaign before being released in January 1900 returning home to Scotland in a poor state of health and dying around six months later.

== Personal life ==
According to the 1881 census, Walker's mother Sarah was born in Leith (one of Scotland's main ports), and his father, also named John, was a dock worker born in "India, West" with mention of "Spain" (presumed to be the West Indies, possibly Port of Spain in Trinidad or a Spanish colony such as Cuba). During his playing career, he was often referred to by the nickname 'Darkie', although this term did not have the same weight as an insult as in later times.

He died of consumption (tuberculosis) in August 1900, aged 24.

Walker was not the first black footballer, being preceded by the likes of Robert Walker (no relation), Andrew Watson, and Arthur Wharton, but he was among the first to play in the Scottish Football League, and to appear for league clubs in both Scotland and England – alongside his contemporary Willie Clarke.
