= Alex Maley =

Scottish football manager and journalist

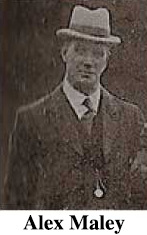

Personal information
- Date of birth: 26 May 1874
- Place of birth: Largs, Scotland
- Date of death: 20 September 1949 (aged 75)
- Place of death: Glasgow, Scotland

Managerial career
- Years: Team
- 1909–1912: Clyde
- 1914–1921: Clydebank
- 1921–1925: Hibernian
- 1925–1927: Crystal Palace
- 1927–?: Clydebank

Alex Maley (26 May 1874 – 20 September 1949) was a Scottish football manager and journalist. He was the younger brother of Tom Maley and Willie Maley.

Alex Maley managed a number of clubs in Scotland and England, including Clyde, Clydebank, Hibernian and Crystal Palace.

Maley became manager of Crystal Palace in November 1925, and oversaw thirteenth- and sixth-place finishes in Division Three in 1926 and 1927 respectively. However, the next season started poorly and after a succession of defeats Maley resigned in October 1927, and returned to Scotland where he had a second spell as manager of Clydebank. He later served as a director of Hibernian.
