= 1985–86 Hibernian F.C. season =

Hibernian
1985–86 season
- Manager: John Blackley
- Scottish Premier Division: 8th
- Scottish Cup: SF
- Scottish League Cup: F
- Highest home attendance: 20,756 (v Heart of Midlothian, 22 March)
- Lowest home attendance: 3394 (v Cowdenbeath, 21 August)
- Average home league attendance: 9,135 (up 1710)

During the 1985–86 season, the Scottish football club Hibernian F.C. was placed 8th in the Scottish Premier Division. The team reached the final of the Scottish League Cup, losing to Aberdeen, and also reached the semifinals of the Scottish Cup.

== Scottish Premier Division ==
Match Day	Date	Opponent	H/A	Score	Hibernian Scorer(s)	Attendance
1	10 August	Aberdeen	A	0–3		14,857
2	17 August	Rangers	H	1–3	Durie	15,056
3	24 August	St Mirren	H	2–3	Kane (pen.), McBride	5,123
4	31 August	Heart of Midlothian	A	1–2	Durie	17,457
5	7 September	Celtic	H	0–5		13,366
6	14 September	Dundee	A	0–1		5,410
7	28 September	Motherwell	H	1–0	Brazil	5,557
8	1 October	Clydebank	H	5–0	Cowan (3), Durie (2)	5,491
9	5 October	Dundee United	A	2–2	Cowan, Sneddon	6,951
10	12 October	Aberdeen	H	1–1	Cowan	10,035
11	19 October	Rangers	A	2–1	Harris, O.G.	23,487
12	30 October	Clydebank	A	4–2	Cowan (2), Kane, Brazil	2,396
13	2 November	Dundee	H	2–1	Kane, Durie	6,474
14	9 November	Heart of Midlothian	H	0–0		19,776
15	16 November	St Mirren	A	3–1	Cowan, Kane, Sneddon	5,670
16	23 November	Celtic	A	1–1	Chisholm	21,510
17	14 December	Aberdeen	A	0–4		12,539
18	21 December	Rangers	H	1–1	Tortolano	10,823
19	1 January	Heart of Midlothian	A	1–3	Harris	25,605
20	4 January	Clydebank	H	2–3	Cowan, May	5,137
21	11 January	Dundee	A	1–3	Callachan	5,073
22	18 January	Celtic	H	2–2	Cowan, Durie	13,512
23	1 February	Motherwell	H	4–0	Cowan (2), Collins, O.G.	4,409
24	8 February	Dundee United	H	0–4		8,504
25	22 February	Aberdeen	H	0–1		9,061
26	26 February	Dundee United	H	0–1		7,137
27	1 March	Rangers	A	1–3	Cowan	16,498
28	12 March	St Mirren	H	3–0	Cowan (3)	4,725
29	15 March	Clydebank	A	3–1	Tortolano (2), Chisholm	2,007
30	18 March	Motherwell	A	0–2		3,266
31	22 March	Heart of Midlothian	H	1–2	Cowan	20,756
32	29 March	St Mirren	A	2–0	Kane, Rae	3,695
33	12 April	Dundee	H	1–0	Rae	4,477
34	19 April	Celtic	A	0–2		9,301
35	26 April	Motherwell	A	1–3	Cowan	2,369
36	3 May	Dundee United	H	1–2	Cowan (pen.)	3,513

=== Final League table ===
Pos	Team	Pld	W	D	L	GF	GA	GD	Pts
6	Dundee	36	14	7	15	45	51	−6	35
7	St Mirren	36	13	5	18	42	63	−21	31
8	Hibernian	36	11	6	19	49	63	−14	28
9	Motherwell	36	7	6	23	33	66	−33	20
10	Clydebank	36	6	8	22	29	77	−48	20

Source: Rsssf
Rules for classification: 1) points; 2) goal difference; 3) number of goals scored.

=== Scottish League Cup ===
Round	Date	Opponent	H/A	Score	Hibernian Scorer(s)	Attendance
R2	21 August	Cowdenbeath	H	6–0	Cowan (3, 1 pen.), Durie (2), Brazil	3,394
R3	28 August	Motherwell	H	6–1	Durie (3), Cowan (2), McBride	5,369
R4	4 September	Celtic	H	4–4 (Hibs won 4–3 on penalties)	Durie (2), Cowan, Harris	15,570
SF L1	25 September	Rangers	H	2–0	Chisholm, Durie	17,916
SF L2	9 October	Rangers	A	0–1		17,916
F	27 October	Aberdeen	N	0–3		40,061

=== Scottish Cup ===
Round	Date	Opponent	H/A	Score	Hibernian Scorer(s)	Attendance
R3	26 January	Dunfermline Athletic	H	2–0	Cowan, May	15,000
R4	16 February	Ayr United	H	1–0	May	10,200
R5	8 March	Celtic	H	4–3	Cowan (2, 1 pen.), Chisholm, May	20,000
SF	5 April	Aberdeen	N	0–3		19,165

== See also ==
- List of Hibernian F.C. seasons
