= 1982–83 Hibernian F.C. season =

Hibernian
1982–83 season
- Manager: Bertie Auld (to September); Pat Stanton (from September)
- Scottish Premier Division: 7th
- Scottish Cup: R3
- Scottish League Cup: Group Stage
- Highest home attendance: 17,121? (v Celtic, 27 November)
- Lowest home attendance: 3571? (v Dundee, 23 April)
- Average home league attendance: 7109 (down 376)

During the 1982–83 season, the Scottish football club Hibernian F.C. was placed 7th in the Scottish Premier Division. The team reached the third round of the Scottish Cup.

== Scottish Premier Division ==
Match Day	Date	Opponent	H/A	Score	Hibernian Scorer(s)	Attendance
1	4 September	St Mirren	H	0–0		5,487
2	11 September	Kilmarnock	A	1–1	Jamieson	2,800
3	18 September	Dundee United	H	0–0		5,562
4	25 September	Celtic	A	0–2		16,371
5	2 October	Morton	H	1–2	Thomson	4,068
6	9 October	Dundee	A	1–2	Rae	5,287
7	16 October	Motherwell	H	1–0	Rae	4,500
8	23 October	Rangers	A	2–3	Murray (2)	7,441
9	30 October	Aberdeen	H	1–1	Murray	6,194
10	6 November	St Mirren	A	0–3		3,660
11	13 November	Kilmarnock	H	2–2	Thomson, Smith	4,192
12	20 November	Dundee United	A	0–3		7,374
13	27 November	Celtic	H	2–3	Murray (2)	17,121
14	4 December	Morton	A	0–0		1,865
15	11 December	Dundee	H	1–1	Rae	5,352
16	18 December	Motherwell	A	1–0	Murray	3,815
17	27 December	Rangers	H	0–0		15,943
18	1 January	Aberdeen	A	0–2		13,938
19	3 January	St Mirren	H	1–1	Duncan	6,080
20	8 January	Kilmarnock	A	2–0	Thomson, Conroy	2,142
21	15 January	Dundee United	H	0–0		5,043
22	22 January	Celtic	A	1–4	O.G.	17,106
23	5 February	Morton	H	2–0	Rae, Harvey	3,376
24	22 February	Dundee	A	1–0	Rice	4,363
25	26 February	Motherwell	H	1–1	Irvine	4,430
26	5 March	Rangers	A	1–1	Jamieson	10,975
27	19 March	St Mirren	A	0–3		4,215
28	26 March	Dundee United	A	3–3	Rae, Rice, Irvine	7,279
29	2 April	Kilmarnock	H	8–1	Irvine (2), Thomson (2), Duncan, Rae, McNamara	4,065
30	9 April	Celtic	H	0–3		16,531
31	16 April	Morton	A	1–0	Thomson	1,677
32	23 April	Dundee	H	0–0		3,571
33	30 April	Motherwell	A	0–2		3,532
34	2 May	Aberdeen	H	0–0		7,891
35	7 May	Rangers	H	1–2	Callachan	8,550
36	14 May	Aberdeen	A	0–5		23,080

=== Final League table ===
Pos	Team	Pld	W	D	L	GF	GA	GD	Pts	Qualification or relegation
5	St Mirren	36	11	12	13	47	51	−4	34	Qualification for the UEFA Cup first round
6	Dundee	36	9	11	16	42	53	−11	29	
7	Hibernian	36	7	15	14	35	51	−16	29	
8	Motherwell	36	11	5	20	39	73	−34	27	
9	Morton (R)	36	6	8	22	36	81	−45	20	Relegation to the 1983–84 Scottish First Division

Source: Statto
Rules for classification: 1) points; 2) goal difference; 3) number of goals scored.
(R) Relegated

=== Scottish League Cup ===
==== Group stage ====
Round	Date	Opponent	H/A	Score	Hibernian Scorer(s)	Attendance
G3	14 August	Rangers	H	1–1	Rae	
G3	18 August	Clydebank	A	2–0	Murray, Rae	
G3	21 August	Airdrieonians	H	1–1	Welsh	
G3	25 August	Clydebank	H	1–1	Rodier	
G3	28 August	Rangers	A	0–0		
G3	1 September	Airdrieonians	A	1–3	Rae	

==== Group 3 Final Table ====
Team	Pld	W	D	L	GF	GA	GD	Pts
Rangers	6	4	2	0	13	6	+7	10
Hibernian	6	1	4	1	6	6	0	6
Airdrieonians	6	2	1	3	9	11	-2	5
Clydebank	6	1	1	4	8	13	-5	3

=== Scottish Cup ===
Round	Date	Opponent	H/A	Score	Hibernian Scorer(s)	Attendance
R3	29 January	Aberdeen	H	1–4	Rae	14,289

== See also ==
- List of Hibernian F.C. seasons
