= 1981–82 Hibernian F.C. season =

Hibernian
1981–82 season
- Manager: Bertie Auld
- Scottish Premier Division: 6th
- Scottish Cup: R4
- Scottish League Cup: Group Stage
- Highest home attendance: 18,245? (v Celtic, 24 October)
- Lowest home attendance: 3118? (v Partick Thistle, 8 May)
- Average home league attendance: 7485 (up 3025)

During the 1981–82 season, the Scottish football club Hibernian F.C. was placed 7th in the Scottish Premier Division. The team reached the fourth round of the Scottish Cup.

== Scottish Premier Division ==
Match Day	Date	Opponent	H/A	Score	Hibernian Scorer(s)	Attendance
1	29 August	Dundee	H	2–0	Murray, Rae	5,738
2	5 September	Rangers	A	2–2	McLeod, Rae	19,919
3	12 September	Airdrieonians	H	1–1	Flavell	5,020
4	19 September	Aberdeen	A	0–1		10,253
5	26 September	St Mirren	A	0–1		4,798
6	3 October	Dundee United	H	1–1	Duncan	5,384
7	10 October	Morton	H	4–0	Flavell, Callachan, Murray, McLeod	4,459
8	17 October	Partick Thistle	A	0–1		4,069
9	24 October	Celtic	H	1–0	McLeod (pen.)	18,245
10	31 October	Dundee	A	0–0		6,011
11	7 November	Rangers	H	1–2	Rae	14,865
12	14 November	Airdrieonians	A	1–3	Rae	3,297
13	21 November	Aberdeen	H	1–1	Callachan	7,629
14	28 November	St Mirren	H	0–0		4,743
15	5 December	Dundee United	A	0–1		7,257
16	19 December	Partick Thistle	H	3–0	McLeod (2), Rae	3,582
17	2 January	Dundee	H	2–1	McLeod, Jamieson,	8,182
18	16 January	Airdrieonians	H	1–0	McLeod	3,969
19	30 January	Rangers	A	1–1	Flavell	14,286
20	2 February	Celtic	A	0–0		16,727
21	6 February	Dundee United	H	0–1		6,133
22	20 February	St Mirren	A	2–2	Rae (2)	5,138
23	27 February	Celtic	H	1–0	Rae	15,914
24	6 March	Partick Thistle	A	2–1	Rae, Paterson	2,516
25	10 March	Aberdeen	A	1–3	Rae	8,693
26	13 March	Morton	H	2–2	Murray, Rae	4,289
27	20 March	Dundee	A	2–2	Callachan (2)	4,345
28	27 March	Rangers	H	0–0		12,320
29	3 April	Airdrieonians	A	0–2	Jamieson (2)	2,018
30	10 April	Aberdeen	H	0–3		7,078
31	14 April	Morton	A	1–2	Jamieson	1,958
32	17 April	Dundee United	A	1–0	Turnbull	6,845
33	24 April	St Mirren	A	2–1	Murray (pen.), Jamieson	3,532
34	1 May	Celtic	A	0–6		16,064
35	8 May	Partick Thistle	H	1–1	Murray	3,118
36	15 May	Morton	A	0–0		1,896

=== Final League table ===
Pos	Team	Pld	W	D	L	GF	GA	GD	Pts	Qualification or relegation
4	Dundee United	36	15	10	11	61	38	+23	40	Qualification for the UEFA Cup first round
5	St Mirren	36	14	9	13	49	52	−3	37	
6	Hibernian	36	11	14	11	38	40	−2	36	
7	Morton	36	9	12	15	31	54	−23	30	
8	Dundee	36	11	4	21	46	72	−26	26	

Source: Statto
Rules for classification: 1) points; 2) goal difference; 3) number of goals scored.

=== Scottish League Cup ===
==== Group stage ====
Round	Date	Opponent	H/A	Score	Hibernian Scorer(s)	Attendance
G1	8 August	St Johnstone	H	1–2	Murray	
G1	12 August	St Mirren	A	0–0		
G1	15 August	Celtic	A	1–4	Duncan	
G1	19 August	St Mirren	H	0–1		
G1	22 August	St Johnstone	A	2–1	Flavell, Rodier	
G1	26 August	Celtic	H	1–4	Paterson	

==== Group 1 Final Table ====
Team	Pld	W	D	L	GF	GA	GD	Pts
St Mirren	6	4	4	1	10	8	+2	9
Celtic	6	4	0	2	18	9	+9	8
St Johnstone	6	2	0	4	8	12	-4	4
Hibernian	6	1	1	4	5	12	-7	3

=== Scottish Cup ===
Round	Date	Opponent	H/A	Score	Hibernian Scorer(s)	Attendance
R3	23 January	Falkirk	H	2–0	Duncan, Rodier	5,082
R4	13 February	Dundee United	A	1–1	Rae	10,735
R4 R	17 February	Dundee United	H	1–1	Paterson	11,039
R4 2R	13 February	Dundee United		0–3		13,759

== See also ==
- List of Hibernian F.C. seasons
