= 1984–85 Hibernian F.C. season =

Hibernian
1984–85 season
- Manager: Pat Stanton (to September); John Blackley (from September)
- Scottish Premier Division: 8th
- Scottish Cup: R3
- Scottish League Cup: R3
- Highest home attendance: 18,925 (v Heart of Midlothian, 1 January)
- Lowest home attendance: 2631 (v St Mirren, 8 December)
- Average home league attendance: 7425 (down 909)

During the 1984–85 season, the Scottish football club Hibernian F.C. was placed 8th in the Scottish Premier Division. The team reached the third round of both the Scottish Cup and the Scottish League Cup.

== Scottish Premier Division ==
Match Day	Date	Opponent	H/A	Score	Hibernian Scorer(s)	Attendance
1	11 August	Celtic	H	0–0		12,415
2	18 August	Dundee	A	1–0	Thomson	6,290
3	25 August	Heart of Midlothian	H	1–2	Kane	16,724
4	1 September	Aberdeen	A	1–4	Jamieson	14,334
5	8 September	Rangers	A	0–2		22,601
6	15 September	Dumbarton	H	2–3	Kane, Thomson	3,642
7	22 September	Dundee United	A	1–2	Thomson	7,333
8	29 September	Morton	H	3–1	Irvine, Kane, Brogan	3,591
9	6 October	St Mirren	A	0–2		4,125
10	13 October	Celtic	A	0–3		27,863
11	20 October	Dundee	H	2–0	Kane (2)	5,032
12	27 October	Heart of Midlothian	A	0–0		20,156
13	6 November	Aberdeen	H	0–3		5,353
14	10 November	Rangers	H	2–2	Irvine, Callachan	12,219
15	17 November	Dumbarton	A	2–2	Durie (2)	2,003
16	24 November	Dundee United	H	0–0		5,271
17	1 December	Morton	A	0–4		2,071
18	8 December	St Mirren	H	2–3	Durie, Kane	2,631
19	15 December	Celtic	H	0–1		8,753
20	29 December	Dundee	A	0–2		5,941
21	1 January	Heart of Midlothian	H	1–2	Jamieson	18,925
22	5 January	Aberdeen	A	0–2		13,774
23	12 January	Rangers	H	2–1	Rice, Harris	18,024
24	19 January	Dumbarton	H	3–1	Sneddon, Rice (pen.), Durie	7,421
25	2 February	Dundee United	A	0–2		7,308
26	9 February	Morton	H	5–1	Durie (3), Sneddon, Harris	4,298
27	23 February	St Mirren	A	1–2	Brazil	3,926
28	2 March	Dundee	H	0–1		4,478
29	16 March	Celtic	A	1–0	Kane	15,820
30	23 March	Aberdeen	H	0–5		8,025
31	2 April	Heart of Midlothian	A	2–2	McBride (2)	17,814
32	6 April	Dumbarton	A	2–0	Rice, Irvine	5,064
33	20 April	Dundee United	H	1–1	Durie	4,056
34	27 April	St Mirren	H	0–4		3,669
35	4 May	Morton	A	2–1	Rice (pen.), Kane	1,447
36	11 May	Rangers	H	1–0	Kane	7,149

=== Final League table ===
Pos	Team	Pld	W	D	L	GF	GA	GD	Pts	Qualification or relegation
6	Dundee	36	15	7	14	48	50	−2	37	
7	Heart of Midlothian	36	13	5	18	47	64	−17	31	
8	Hibernian	36	10	7	19	38	61	−23	27	
9	Dumbarton (R)	36	6	7	23	29	64	−35	19	Relegation to the 1985–86 Scottish First Division
10	Morton (R)	36	5	2	29	29	100	−71	12	Relegation to the 1985–86 Scottish First Division

Source: Statto
Rules for classification: 1) points; 2) goal difference; 3) number of goals scored.
(R) Relegated

=== Scottish League Cup ===
Round	Date	Opponent	H/A	Score	Hibernian Scorer(s)	Attendance
R2	22 August	East Fife	H	1–0	Callachan	3,135
R3	29 August	Meadowbank Thistle	H	1–2	Callachan	3,202

=== Scottish Cup ===
Round	Date	Opponent	H/A	Score	Hibernian Scorer(s)	Attendance
R3	4 February	Dundee United	A	0–3		10,125

== See also ==
- List of Hibernian F.C. seasons
