= 1980–81 Hibernian F.C. season =

Hibernian
1980–81 season
- Manager: Willie Ormond (to November); Bertie Auld (from November)
- Scottish First Division: 1st
- Scottish Cup: R5
- Scottish League Cup: R4
- Highest home attendance: 8071? (v Raith Rovers, 18 April)
- Lowest home attendance: 2825? (v East Stirlingshire, 11 April)
- Average home league attendance: 4460 (down 5104)

1980–81 was a better season for Hibs. A good run in the First Division, with just six losses and victories of 5–0 against Dunfermline and 4–0 against Hamilton, led to promotion back to the top flight. The cup performances saw a fourth round exit against Ayr in the League Cup and a fifth round defeat by Rangers in the Scottish Cup.

== Scottish First Division ==
Match Day	Date	Opponent	H/A	Score	Hibernian Scorer(s)	Attendance
1	9 August	Raith Rovers	H	0–1		4,846
2	16 August	Stirling Albion	A	2–0	Rae, Cormack	2,346
3	23 August	Berwick Rangers	H	3–0	McLeod (2 pens.), Paterson	3,875
4	6 September	Motherwell	H	1–0	Jamieson	4,390
5	9 September	Dundee	A	2–1	Rae, McLeod	5,304
6	13 September	Ayr United	A	3–1	Rae, McLeod, Jamieson	3,860
7	17 September	East Stirlingshire	H	2–2	Jamieson (2)	3,615
8	20 September	Hamilton Academical	A	1–1	Connolly	5,197
9	27 September	Clydebank	H	4–1	Rae, McLeod, Connolly, Wilson	4,505
10	1 October	Dumbarton	A	0–2		1,051
11	4 October	Dunfermline Athletic	A	2–0	McLeod (2)	5,607
12	11 October	Falkirk	H	2–0	Connolly, Jamieson	6,947
13	18 October	St Johnstone	A	2–1	Jamieson, McLeod	4,140
14	25 October	Ayr United	H	1–0	Brazil	4,457
15	1 November	Motherwell	A	0–2		3,855
16	8 November	East Stirlingshire	A	1–1	Jamieson	1,963
17	15 November	Hamilton Academical	H	3–3	McLeod (2 – 1 pen.), Rae	3,659
18	22 November	Clydebank	A	1–1	Brown	1,700
19	29 November	Dunfermline Athletic	H	1–0	McLeod	4,350
20	6 December	Falkirk	A	2–0	McLeod, Rae	3,764
21	13 December	St Johnstone	H	4–0	Callachan (2 pens.), Rae (2)	4,244
22	20 December	Dundee	A	0–1		7,454
23	27 December	Stirling Albion	H	3–0	McLeod (2), Connolly	5,016
24	1 January	Berwick Rangers	A	2–0	McLeod, Duncan	2,516
25	3 January	Dumbarton	H	1–0	Murray	5,544
26	10 January	Raith Rovers	A	0–2		9,603
27	17 January	Falkirk	H	1–0	Paterson	6,470
28	31 January	Berwick Rangers	A	0–0		2,019
29	7 February	Dundee	H	0–0		4,619
30	21 February	Hamilton Academical	H	4–0	Jamieson (2), Connolly, O.G.	2,888
31	28 February	Dunfermline Athletic	A	5–0	Jamieson (2), Connolly (2), Rae (pen.)	2,729
32	18 March	St Johnstone	H	1–2	McNamara	3,678
33	21 March	Dumbarton	A	4–1	Rae (2), Murray (2)	913
34	28 March	Ayr United	A	1–0	Jamieson	2,997
35	4 April	Stirling Albion	H	0–0		3,317
36	11 April	East Stirlingshire	H	2–0	Connolly, Callachan	2,825
37	15 April	Clydebank	H	3–0	Rae (2), Paterson	3,691
38	18 April	Raith Rovers	H	2–0	Murray, Callachan	8,071
39	25 April	Motherwell	A	1–1	Murray	3,478

=== Final League table ===
Pos	Team	Pld	W	D	L	GF	GA	GD	Pts	Promotion or relegation
1	Hibernian (C, P)	39	24	9	6	67	24	+43	57	Promotion to the Premier Division
2	Dundee (P)	39	22	8	9	64	40	+24	52	Promotion to the Premier Division
3	St Johnstone	39	21	10	8	64	44	+20	52	
4	Raith Rovers	39	20	10	9	49	32	+17	50	
5	Motherwell	39	19	11	9	65	51	+14	49	

Source: RSSSF
Rules for classification: 1) points; 2) goal difference; 3) number of goals scored.
(C) Champions; (P) Promoted

=== Scottish League Cup ===
Round	Date	Opponent	H/A	Score	Hibernian Scorer(s)	Attendance
R2 L1	27 August	Alloa Athletic	A	2–0	McLeod, Rae	1,750
R2 L2	30 August	Alloa Athletic	H	1–1	Hamill	2,500
R3 L1	3 September	Clyde	A	2–0	McLeod, Rae	1,300
R3 L2	24 September	Clyde	H	2–1	Jamieson (2)	3,773
R4 L1	8 October	Ayr United	A	2–2	Wilson, McLeod	4,717
R4 L2	22 October	Ayr United	H	0–2 (aet)		5,500

=== Scottish Cup ===
Round	Date	Opponent	H/A	Score	Hibernian Scorer(s)	Attendance
R3	23 January	Dunfermline Athletic	H	1–1	McLeod	6,550
R3 R	28 January	Dunfermline Athletic	A	2–1	Callachan, Rae	8,552
R4	14 February	Falkirk	H	1–0	Callachan	6,425
R5	7 March	Rangers	A	1–3	McNamara	26,345

== See also ==
- List of Hibernian F.C. seasons
