= 1986–87 Hibernian F.C. season =

Hibernian
1986–87 season
- Manager: John Blackley (to November); Alex Miller (from November)
- Scottish Premier Division: 9th
- Scottish Cup: R4
- Scottish League Cup: R4
- Highest home attendance: 22,298 (v Heart of Midlothian, 6 January)
- Lowest home attendance: 3590 (v Hamilton Academical, 25 April)
- Average home league attendance: 9,140 (up 5)

During the 1986–87 season, the Scottish football club Hibernian F.C. was placed 9th in the Scottish Premier Division. The team reached the fourth round of both the Scottish Cup and the Scottish League Cup.

== Overview ==
During the 1986 close season, Hibs sold Gordon Durie to Chelsea for £400,000, and brought in Billy Kirkwood, Stuart Beedie, Willie Irvine, Mark Caughey and George McCluskey. They played pre-season friendlies against Chelsea, as part of the deal for Durie, and Sevilla. Before the season started, Hibs manager John Blackley hoped to qualify for European competition and to have extended runs in the cup competitions.

In the opening-day victory over Rangers at Easter Road, after a Graeme Souness tackle on George McCluskey in the centre circle, for which he was sent off, the SFA retrospectively gave 21 players yellow cards for the on-pitch fighting that followed the tackle. Only Hibs' goalkeeper Alan Rough was spared, because he remained in his penalty area, although McCluskey and Mark Fulton successfully appealed against their cautions.

Despite the win against Rangers, Hibs fell well short of Blackley's pre-season hopes. Blackley resigned in November and was subsequently replaced by Alex Miller, who at least prevented the club from falling into the relegation zone. A return game against Sevilla was played in December.

== Scottish Premier Division ==
Match Day	Date	Opponent	H/A	Score	Hibernian Scorer(s)	Attendance
1	9 August	Rangers	H	2–1	Beedie, Cowan	21,674
2	13 August	Aberdeen	A	0–4		12,918
3	16 August	Dundee	A	0–3		7,216
4	23 August	Motherwell	H	0–0		6,276
5	30 August	Heart of Midlothian	H	1–3	McBride	20,714
6	6 September	Falkirk	A	1–1	McBride	4,956
7	13 September	St Mirren	H	0–1		4,567
8	20 September	Celtic	A	1–5	Beedie	6,453
9	27 September	Dundee United	H	1–1	McBride	5,407
10	4 October	Hamilton Academical	A	4–1	May (2), McCluskey, McBride	3,478
11	8 October	Clydebank	H	3–2	Irvine (2), Kirkwood	5,030
12	11 October	Rangers	A	0–3		38,145
13	18 October	Aberdeen	H	1–1	Chisholm	8,758
14	25 October	Motherwell	A	1–4	Chisholm	4,007
15	29 October	Dundee	H	0–3		4,221
16	1 November	Heart of Midlothian	A	1–1	McBride	22,178
17	8 November	Falkirk	H	1–0	McCluskey	5,574
18	15 November	St Mirren	A	1–3	Kane	3,279
19	19 November	Celtic	H	0–1		15,397
20	22 November	Dundee United	A	0–1		6,862
21	29 November	Hamilton Academical	H	1–3	Collins	4,659
22	3 December	Clydebank	A	0–0		1,356
23	6 December	Rangers	H	0–0		17,639
24	13 December	Aberdeen	A	0–1		11,003
25	20 December	Motherwell	H	0–1		4,714
26	27 December	Dundee	A	0–2		6,238
27	3 January	Falkirk	A	3–1	Bell, McCluskey (pen), Collins	7,007
28	6 January	Heart of Midlothian	H	2–2	Weir, McCluskey	22,298
29	10 January	St Mirren	H	1–0	Mitchell	8,234
30	21 January	Celtic	A	0–1		19,583
31	24 January	Dundee United	A	0–2		7,398
32	7 February	Hamilton Academical	A	1–0	Cowan	3,903
33	14 February	Clydebank	H	4–1	May, Weir, Cowan, McBride	5,236
34	28 February	Rangers	A	1–1	May	36,931
35	7 March	Aberdeen	H	1–1	McCluskey	6,394
36	21 March	Dundee	H	2–2	Rae, McCluskey	4,305
37	24 March	Motherwell	A	1–2	Rae	2,934
38	28 March	Falkirk	H	2–0	McCluskey, Cowan	4,039
39	4 April	Heart of Midlothian	A	1–2	O.G.	19,731
40	11 April	Celtic	H	1–4	McCluskey	14,432
41	18 April	St Mirren	A	1–1	Weir	3,456
42	25 April	Hamilton Academical	H	1–1	McCluskey	3,590
43	2 May	Dundee United	A	1–2	Bell	9,301
44	9 May	Clydebank	A	2–1	May, Weir	1,172

=== Final League table ===
Pos	Team	Pld	W	D	L	GF	GA	GD	Pts	Qualification or relegation
7	St Mirren	44	12	12	20	36	51	−15	36	Qualification for the Cup Winners' Cup first round
8	Motherwell	44	11	12	21	43	64	−21	34	
9	Hibernian	44	10	13	21	44	70	−26	33	
10	Falkirk	44	8	10	26	31	70	−39	26	
11	Clydebank (R)	44	6	12	26	35	93	−58	24	Relegation to the 1987–88 Scottish First Division

Source: Statto
Rules for classification: 1) points; 2) goal difference; 3) number of goals scored.
(R) Relegated

=== Scottish League Cup ===
Round	Date	Opponent	H/A	Score	Hibernian Scorer(s)	Attendance
R2	20 August	East Stirlingshire	H	1–0	Kane	
R3	27 August	Hamilton Academical	A	1–0	Beedie	
R4	3 September	Dundee United	H	0–2		

=== Scottish Cup ===
Round	Date	Opponent	H/A	Score	Hibernian Scorer(s)	Attendance
R3	31 January	Dunfermline Athletic	H	2–0	Kane, Weir	16,500
R4	21 February	Clydebank	A	0–1		6,500

== See also ==
- List of Hibernian F.C. seasons
