= 1983–84 Hibernian F.C. season =

Hibernian
1983–84 season
- Manager: Pat Stanton
- Scottish Premier Division: 7th
- Scottish Cup: R3
- Scottish League Cup: Group Stage
- Highest home attendance: 21,281 (v Heart of Midlothian, 5 November)
- Lowest home attendance: 1831 (v Airdrieonians, 5 October)
- Average home league attendance: 8334 (up 1225)

In the 1983–84 season, Hibs finished 7th in the Scottish Premier Division. They were knocked out in the third round of the Scottish Cup by East Fife, after a replay. The East Fife line up included a young Gordon Durie, who Hibs signed a few months later.

== Scottish Premier Division ==
Match Day	Date	Opponent	H/A	Score	Hibernian Scorer(s)	Attendance
1	20 August	Celtic	H	0–2		15,084
2	3 September	Heart of Midlothian	A	2–3	Callachan, Irvine	19,206
3	10 September	Dundee United	A	0–5		7,790
4	17 September	St Mirren	H	3–1	Irvine, Conroy, Harvey	3,762
5	24 September	Motherwell	H	2–1	Irvine, Rice (pen.)	4,602
6	1 October	St Johnstone	A	3–0	Irvine, Brazil, Thomson	3,523
7	8 September	Rangers	A	0–1		21,301
8	15 October	Aberdeen	H	2–1	Irvine (2)	7,441
9	22 October	Dundee	H	2–1	Irvine (pen.), Duncan	5,560
10	29 October	Celtic	A	1–5	Thomson	13,777
11	5 November	Heart of Midlothian	H	1–1	Thomson	21,281
12	12 November	St Mirren	A	1–2	Irvine	3,789
13	19 November	St Johnstone	H	4–1	Irvine (3), Duncan	4,202
14	26 November	Motherwell	A	2–1	Sneddon, Callachan	3,965
15	3 December	Dundee United	H	0–2		6,978
16	10 December	Dundee	A	3–0	Irvine (2), Thomson	4,628
17	17 December	Aberdeen	A	1–2	Irvine	13,866
18	27 December	Rangers	H	0–2		18,521
19	31 December	Celtic	H	0–1		10,204
20	2 January	Heart of Midlothian	A	1–1	Irvine	23,499
21	7 January	St Mirren	H	1–1	Harvey	4,371
22	11 February	Dundee United	A	0–2		7,675
23	18 February	St Johnstone	A	0–1		2,415
24	25 February	Aberdeen	H	0–2		6,914
25	29 February	Dundee	H	3–1	Irvine (pen.), Jamieson, Kane	12,601 (original game abandoned fog. This rearranged fixture free admission)
26	3 March	Rangers	A	0–0		17,877
27	10 March	Motherwell	H	1–2	Irvine (pen.)	4,164
28	18 March	St Johnstone	H	1–2	Rice	3,489
29	21 March	St Mirren	A	1–3	Callachan	2,452
30	24 March	Motherwell	A	3–2	Jamieson, Irvine (pen.), Rice	3,397
31	31 March	Dundee	A	2–1	Jamieson, Irvine	4,355
32	7 April	Dundee United	H	1–0	Jamieson	4,266
33	21 April	Heart of Midlothian	H	0–0		17,437
34	28 April	Celtic	A	2–3	Rice, Callachan	9,533
35	5 May	Aberdeen	A	2–2	Rice, McGachie	17,268
36	12 May	Rangers	H	0–0		9,134

=== Final League table ===
Pos	Team	Pld	W	D	L	GF	GA	GD	Pts	Qualification or relegation
5	Heart of Midlothian	36	10	16	10	38	47	−9	36	Qualification for the UEFA Cup first round
6	St Mirren	36	9	14	13	55	59	−4	32	
7	Hibernian	36	12	7	17	45	55	−10	31	
8	Dundee	36	11	5	20	50	74	−24	27	
9	St Johnstone (R)	36	10	3	23	36	81	−45	23	Relegation to the 1984–85 Scottish First Division

Source: Statto
Rules for classification: 1) points; 2) goal difference; 3) number of goals scored.
(R) Relegated

=== Scottish League Cup ===
==== Second round ====
Round	Date	Opponent	H/A	Score	Hibernian Scorer(s)	Attendance
R2 L1	24 August	Dumbarton	H	5–0	Irvine (3), Thomson, O.G.	2,193
R2 L2	27 August	Dumbarton	A	2–1	Irvine, Conroy	760

==== Group stage ====
Round	Date	Opponent	H/A	Score	Hibernian Scorer(s)	Attendance
G3	31 August	Kilmarnock	H	2–0	Rice, Irvine	2,681
G3	7 September	Celtic	A	1–5	Conroy	11,046
G3	5 October	Airdrieonians	H	0–0		1,831
G3	26 October	Celtic	H	0–0		6,882
G3	9 November	Kilmarnock	A	1–3	Schaedler	2,001
G3	30 November	Airdrieonians	A	3–1	Harvey (2), Murray	738

==== Group 3 Final Table ====
Team	Pld	W	D	L	GF	GA	GD	Pts
Celtic	6	3	3	0	13	3	+10	9
Kilmarnock	6	3	1	2	9	6	+3	7
Hibernian	6	2	2	2	7	9	-2	6
Airdrieonians	6	0	2	4	3	14	-11	2

=== Scottish Cup ===
Round	Date	Opponent	H/A	Score	Hibernian Scorer(s)	Attendance
R3	28 January	East Fife	H	0–0		5,683
R3 R	31 January	East Fife	A	0–2		6,100

== See also ==
- List of Hibernian F.C. seasons
