= 1978–79 Hibernian F.C. season =

Hibernian
1978–79 season
- Manager: Eddie Turnbull
- Scottish Premier Division: 5th
- Scottish Cup: F
- Scottish League Cup: SF
- UEFA Cup: R2
- Highest home attendance: 22,618 (v Heart of Midlothian, 10 March)
- Lowest home attendance: 3242 (v Rangers, 31 May)
- Average home league attendance: 9794 (down 156)

In the 1978–79 season Hibernian FC managed a fifth-place finish in the league, with notable wins of 3–0 and 4–0 against Motherwell tempered by a 6–1 loss to Partick Thistle late in the season. In the UEFA cup they reached the second round, being beaten 2–1 on aggregate by RC Strasbourg. In the Scottish Cup they made the final, but ultimately after two goalless draws, they lost out to Rangers 3–2 after extra time in a hotly contested second replay.

== Scottish Premier Division ==
Match Day	Date	Opponent	H/A	Score	Hibernian Scorer(s)	Attendance
1	12 August	Dundee United	A	0–0		5,876
2	19 August	Rangers	H	0–0		22,461
3	26 August	Heart of Midlothian	A	1–1	McLeod	19,663
4	9 September	St Mirren	H	1–0	Higgins	7,917
5	16 September	Celtic	A	1–0	Temperley	26,169
6	23 September	Aberdeen	H	2–1	McLeod (pen.), Rae	12,060
7	30 September	Morton	H	1–1	McLeod	8,648
8	7 October	Motherwell	A	3–2	McLeod, Hutchinson, Rae	5,516
9	14 October	Partick Thistle	A	1–2	Higgins	7,487
10	21 October	Dundee United	H	1–1	Rae	8,290
11	28 October	Rangers	A	1–2	McLeod	25,492
12	4 November	Heart of Midlothian	H	1–2	Rae	20,120
13	11 November	St Mirren	A	0–1		8,085
14	18 November	Celtic	H	2–2	Callachan, Hutchinson	21,450
15	25 November	Aberdeen	A	1–4	Hutchinson	14,205
16	9 December	Motherwell	H	2–2	Higgins, Hutchinson	5,391
17	16 December	Partick Thistle	H	0–0		6,043
18	23 December	Dundee United	A	1–2	Bremner	7,194
19	20 January	Aberdeen	H	1–1	Duncan	4,991
20	10 February	Motherwell	A	3–0	Callachan, Bremner, McLeod	5,101
21	24 February	Morton	H	1–1	Bremner	5,691
22	3 March	Dundee United	H	1–0	Bremner	5,045
23	14 March	Rangers	A	0–1		17,401
24	17 March	Heart of Midlothian	H	1–1	Campbell	13,297
25	24 March	St Mirren	A	3–2	McLeod, Higgins, Campbell	8,192
26	28 March	Heart of Midlothian	A	2–1	McLeod, Callachan	16,042
27	31 March	Celtic	H	2–1	Rae, Stewart	16,071
28	4 April	St Mirren	H	0–2		5,867
29	7 April	Aberdeen	A	0–0		12,253
30	14 April	Morton	A	2–2	Callachan (2)	6,543
31	18 April	Morton	A	0–3		5,497
32	21 April	Motherwell	H	4–0	Callachan, Rae, Campbell, Bremner	4,356
33	26 April	Partick Thistle	A	1–6	Callachan	2,816
34	29 April	Partick Thistle	H	1–0	Callachan	5,356
35	2 May	Celtic	A	1–3	Callachan	21,728
36	31 May	Rangers	H	2–1	Rae, O.G.	3,242

=== Final League table ===
Pos	Team	Pld	W	D	L	GF	GA	GD	Pts	Qualification or relegation
3	Dundee United	36	18	8	10	56	37	+19	44	Qualification for the UEFA Cup first round
4	Aberdeen	36	13	14	9	59	36	+23	40	Qualification for the UEFA Cup first round
5	Hibernian	36	12	13	11	44	48	−4	37	
6	St Mirren	36	15	6	15	45	41	+4	36	
7	Morton	36	12	12	12	52	53	−1	36	

Source: Statto and RSSSF
Rules for classification: 1) points; 2) goal difference; 3) number of goals scored.

=== Scottish League Cup ===
Round	Date	Opponent	H/A	Score	Hibernian Scorer(s)	Attendance
R2 L1	30 August	Brechin City	A	3–0	Callachan, Rae, Smith	1,645
R2 L2	2 September	Brechin City	H	3–1	McLeod (2), Callachan	5,254
R3 L1	4 October	Clydebank	H	1–0	McLeod (pen.)	5,392
R3 L2	11 October	Clydebank	A	1–1	Stewart	2,870
R4 L1	8 November	Morton	A	0–1		6,531
R4 L2	15 November	Morton	H	2–0	Refvik (2)	8,520
SF	13 December	Aberdeen	N	0–1 (aet)		21,048

=== UEFA Cup ===
Round	Date	Opponent	H/A	Score	Hibernian Scorer(s)	Attendance
R1 L1	13 September	(Sweden) IFK Norrköping	H	3–2	Higgins (2), Temperley	10,000
R1 L2	27 September	(Sweden) IFK Norrköping	A	0–0		1,300
R2 L1	18 October	(France) RC Strasbourg	A	0–2		25,000
R2 L2	1 November	(France) RC Strasbourg	H	1–0	McLeod (pen.)	14,662

=== Scottish Cup ===
Round	Date	Opponent	H/A	Score	Hibernian Scorer(s)	Attendance
R3	28 January	Dunfermline Athletic	A	1–1	Higgins	11,801
R3 R	12 February	Dunfermline Athletic	H	2–0	McLeod, Callachan	5,000
R4	21 February	Meadowbank Thistle	A	6–0	McLeod (2), Higgins, Brazil, Duncan, Callachan	5,029
R5	10 March	Heart of Midlothian	H	2–1	Stewart, Rae	22,618
SF	11 April	Aberdeen	N	2–1	Rae, McLeod (pen.)	9,384
F	12 May	Rangers	N	0–0 (aet)		53,615
F R	16 May	Rangers	N	0–0 (aet)		32,853
F 2R	28 May	Rangers	N	2–3 (aet)	Higgins, McLeod	27,556

== See also ==
- List of Hibernian F.C. seasons
