= 1979–80 Hibernian F.C. season =

Hibernian
1979–80 season
- Manager: Eddie Turnbull (to April); Willie Ormond (from April)
- Scottish Premier Division: 10th
- Scottish Cup: SF
- Scottish League Cup: R3
- Anglo-Scottish Cup: R1
- Highest home attendance: 21,932 (v Celtic, 12 January)
- Lowest home attendance: 1191 (v Partick Thistle, 5 May)
- Average home league attendance: 9564 (down 230)

The 1979–80 season was the 104th season of football for Hibernian F.C. The club finished in 10th place, relegating them to the First Division, 15 points from safety. Hibernian made it to the semi finals of the Scottish Cup before being defeated by Celtic 5-0.

== Scottish Premier Division ==
Match Day	Date	Opponent	H/A	Score	Hibernian Scorer(s)	Attendance
1	11 August	Rangers	H	1–3	Rae	17,331
2	18 August	Aberdeen	A	0–3		11,147
3	25 August	Dundee	H	5–2	Hutchinson (2), Callachan, Rae, McLeod	7,344
4	8 September	Kilmarnock	A	0–1		4,654
5	15 September	Celtic	H	1–3	Higgins	19,086
6	22 September	St Mirren	H	0–2		6,525
7	29 September	Partick Thistle	A	1–2	O.G.	4,327
8	6 October	Morton	H	1–1	McLeod	6,461
9	13 October	Dundee United	A	0–2		7,487
10	20 October	Rangers	A	0–2		19,710
11	27 October	Aberdeen	H	1–1	Hutchinson	7,830
12	3 November	Dundee	A	1–2	McLeod (pen.)	6,979
13	10 November	Kilmarnock	H	1–1	McLeod	5,269
14	17 November	Celtic	A	0–3		23,511
15	24 November	St Mirren	A	1–2	Best	13,798
16	1 December	Partick Thistle	H	2–1	McLeod (pen.), O.G.	22,622
17	15 December	Morton	A	0–2		6,834
18	22 December	Rangers	H	2–1	Higgins, Campbell	18,740
19	5 January	Kilmarnock	A	1–3	Campbell	6,092
20	12 January	Celtic	H	1–1	Best	21,932
21	9 February	Morton	H	3–2	McLeod (2), Murray	5,401
22	23 February	Dundee United	A	0–1		7,822
23	1 March	Rangers	A	0–1		26,092
24	15 March	Dundee	A	0–3		8,065
25	25 March	Dundee	H	2–0	Murray, Best	5,018
26	29 March	Celtic	A	0–4		20,926
27	2 April	Dundee United	A	0–2		5,919
28	5 April	St Mirren	A	0–2		8,156
29	16 April	Aberdeen	A	1–1	Rae	15,127
30	19 April	Dundee United	H	0–2		4,921
31	21 April	Kilmarnock	H	1–2	McLeod (pen.)	2,659
32	23 April	Partick Thistle	A	0–1		1,894
33	26 April	Morton	A	1–1	Callachan	3,504
34	29 April	St Mirren	H	2–1	Rae, Torrance	2,590
35	3 May	Aberdeen	H	0–5		12,921
36	5 May	Partick Thistle	H	0–1		1,191

=== Final League table ===
Pos	Team	Pld	W	D	L	GF	GA	GD	Pts	Qualification or relegation
6	Morton	36	14	8	14	51	46	+5	36	
7	Partick Thistle	36	11	14	11	43	47	−4	36	
8	Kilmarnock	36	11	11	14	36	52	−16	33	
9	Dundee (R)	36	10	6	20	47	73	−26	26	Relegation to the 1980–81 Scottish First Division
10	Hibernian (R)	36	6	6	24	29	67	−38	18	Relegation to the 1980–81 Scottish First Division

Source: Statto and RSSSF
Rules for classification: 1) points; 2) goal difference; 3) number of goals scored.
(R) Relegated

=== Scottish League Cup ===
Round	Date	Opponent	H/A	Score	Hibernian Scorer(s)	Attendance
R2 L1	29 August	Montrose	A	2–1		3,613
R2 L2	1 September	Montrose	H	1–1		2.028
R3 L1	26 September	Kilmarnock	H	1–2		4,241
R3 L2	10 October	Kilmarnock	H	1–2		5,353

=== Anglo-Scottish Cup ===
Round	Date	Opponent	H/A	Score	Hibernian Scorer(s)	Attendance
R1 L1	28 July	St Mirren	H	3–3	Stewart, Brown, Higgins	
R1 L2	1 August	St Mirren	A	0–1		

=== Scottish Cup ===
Round	Date	Opponent	H/A	Score	Hibernian Scorer(s)	Attendance
R3	26 January	Meadowbank Thistle	A	1–0		8,415
R4	17 February	Ayr United	H	2–0		15,000
R5	8 March	Berwick Rangers	A	0–0		7,228
R5 R	12 March	Berwick Rangers	H	1–0		9,587
SF	12 April	Celtic	N	0–5		33,445

== See also ==
- List of Hibernian F.C. seasons
