= 1987–88 Hibernian F.C. season =

Hibernian
1987–88 season
- Manager: Alex Miller
- Scottish Premier Division: 6th
- Scottish Cup: R4
- Scottish League Cup: R4
- Highest home attendance: 24,000 (v Celtic, 23 February)
- Lowest home attendance: 4000 (v Montrose, 18 August)
- Average home league attendance: 11,565 (up 2425)

The 1987–88 Season was year of moderate improvement for Hibs. Attendances were up significantly on the previous year, and the sixth-place finish in the league was better than 1987's ninth place. They narrowly lost out to Motherwell in the fourth round of the League cup. In the Scottish cup, Hibs took Celtic to a lucrative fourth round home replay in the Scottish cup. They narrowly lost, but the turnout of 24,000 was one of the best gates of recent years at Easter Road.

== Scottish Premier Division ==
Match Day	Date	Opponent	H/A	Score	Hibernian Scorer(s)	Attendance
1	8 August	Dunfermline Athletic	A	3–3	Kane, Collins, McBride	11,551
2	12 August	Rangers	H	1–0	Collins	20,404
3	15 August	Dundee	H	0–4		7,925
4	22 August	Morton	A	3–3	Weir, Kane, Collins	3,847
5	29 August	Heart of Midlothian	A	0–1		24,496
6	5 September	St Mirren	H	1–1	Dawson (own goal)	5,806
7	12 September	Dundee United	A	2–1	McCluskey, Watson	7,920
8	19 September	Falkirk	H	1–0	Kane	6,453
9	26 September	Aberdeen	H	0–2		10,359
10	3 October	Celtic	A	1–1	Watson	29,802
11	6 October	Motherwell	A	0–1		4,093
12	10 October	Dunfermline Athletic	H	4–0	May, Kane, Collins, McCluskey	9,286
13	17 October	Heart of Midlothian	H	2–1	May, Kane	23,890
14	24 October	St Mirren	A	2–2	Mitchell, Watson	7,014
15	28 October	Dundee United	H	0–1		9,250
16	31 October	Falkirk	A	1–1	Bell	6,139
17	7 November	Rangers	A	0–1		37,517
18	14 November	Motherwell	H	1–0	Kane	6,878
19	18 November	Morton	H	0–0		6,326
20	21 November	Dundee	A	1–2	Collins	6,586
21	24 November	Aberdeen	A	1–1	Kane	9,424
22	28 November	Celtic	H	0–1		23,055
23	5 December	Dunfermline Athletic	A	0–1		8,311
24	12 December	Rangers	H	0–2		18,425
25	16 December	Dundee United	A	2–1	Kane, McCluskey	6,095
26	19 December	Falkirk	H	0–0		5,638
27	26 December	St Mirren	H	0–0		6,847
28	2 January	Heart of Midlothian	A	0–0		28,992
29	9 January	Aberdeen	H	0–0		16,947
30	16 January	Celtic	A	0–2		32,889
31	23 January	Morton	A	1–1	McGovern	3,397
32	6 February	Dundee	H	2–1	Tortolano, Evans	7,908
33	13 February	Motherwell	A	2–0	Weir, Collins	5,421
34	27 February	Dunfermline Athletic	H	2–0	Weir, McCluskey	8,664
35	5 March	Dundee United	H	0–0		8,401
36	12 March	Falkirk	A	0–1		5,679
37	19 March	Heart of Midlothian	H	0–0		20,870
38	26 March	St Mirren	A	1–1	Evans	4,655
39	2 April	Celtic	H	0–2		19,357
40	16 April	Rangers	A	1–1	Kane	32,218
41	23 April	Motherwell	H	1–1	Tortolano	5,399
42	30 April	Dundee	A	0–0		4,597
43	4 May	Aberdeen	A	2–0	Kane, Tortolano	7,626
44	7 May	Morton	H	3–1	Tortolano, Orr, Goram	6,849

=== Final League table ===
Pos	Team	Pld	W	D	L	GF	GA	GD	Pts	Qualification or relegation
4	Aberdeen	44	21	17	6	56	25	+31	59	Qualification for the UEFA Cup first round
5	Dundee United	44	16	15	13	54	47	+7	47	Qualification for the Cup Winners' Cup first round
6	Hibernian	44	12	19	13	41	42	−1	43	
7	Dundee	44	17	7	20	70	64	+6	41	
8	Motherwell	44	13	10	21	37	56	−19	36	

Source: Statto
Rules for classification: 1) points; 2) goal difference; 3) number of goals scored.

=== Scottish League Cup ===
Round	Date	Opponent	H/A	Score	Hibernian Scorer(s)	Attendance
R2	18 August	Montrose	H	3–2	Tortolano, May, McCluskey	4,000
R3	25 August	Queen of the South	H	3–1	Kane (2 including penalty), Orr	6,833
R4	1 September	Motherwell	A	0–1		8,738

=== Scottish Cup ===
Round	Date	Opponent	H/A	Score	Hibernian Scorer(s)	Attendance
R3	30 January	Dumbarton	A	0–0		7,000
R3 R	2 February	Dumbarton	H	3–0	Tortolano, Orr	8,000
R4	21 February	Celtic	A	0–0		30,357
R4 R	23 February	Celtic	H	0–1		24,000

== See also ==
- List of Hibernian F.C. seasons
