= 1977–78 Hibernian F.C. season =

Hibernian
1977–78 season
- Manager: Eddie Turnbull
- Scottish Premier Division: 4th
- Scottish Cup: R4
- Scottish League Cup: R1
- Anglo-Scottish Cup: SF
- Highest home attendance: 22,590 (v Rangers, 29 October)
- Lowest home attendance: 4585 (v Queen of the South, 17 August)
- Average home league attendance: 9950 (down 53)

During the 1977–78 season Hibernian, a football club based in Edinburgh, came fourth out of 10 clubs in the Scottish Premier Division and reached the fourth round of the Scottish Cup.

== Scottish Premier Division ==
Match Day	Date	Opponent	H/A	Score	Hibernian Scorer(s)	Attendance
1	13 August	Motherwell	H	0–0		8,855
2	20 August	Rangers	A	2–0	Rae, Bremner	22,357
3	27 August	Clydebank	H	2–0	Scott, Brazil	6,750
4	10 September	Dundee United	A	0–2		6,518
5	17 September	Partick Thistle	A	0–1		4,857
6	24 September	St Mirren	H	2–0	Higgins, McLeod	9,625
7	1 October	Celtic	A	1–3	McKay	24,791
8	8 October	Ayr United	H	1–2	O.G.	5,517
9	15 October	Aberdeen	A	2–1	McLeod, O.G.	12,774
10	22 October	Motherwell	A	0–1		5,045
11	29 October	Rangers	H	0–1		22,590
12	5 November	Clydebank	A	0–1		3,022
13	12 November	Dundee United	H	0–0		5,666
14	19 November	Partick Thistle	H	2–3	McLeod, Stewart	5,441
15	26 November	St Mirren	A	0–3		7,783
16	10 December	Ayr United	A	1–0	Duncan	4,065
17	17 December	Aberdeen	H	2–0	Murray, Duncan	6,606
18	24 December	Motherwell	H	2–1	Paterson, McLeod (pen.)	8,305
19	31 December	Rangers	A	0–0		27,155
20	2 January	Clydebank	H	2–0	McGhee, McLeod	8,284
21	7 January	Dundee United	A	1–1	McLeod	6,880
22	25 February	Aberdeen	A	0–3		12,060
23	11 March	St Mirren	H	5–1	Higgins, Hutchinson (2), Brazil, McLeod (pen.)	6,249
24	15 March	Motherwell	A	4–2	Bremner, Murray, McLeod (2)	4,536
25	18 March	Clydebank	A	3–0	McLeod (2), Hutchinson	2,191
26	22 March	Ayr United	H	4–2	McLeod (pen.), Hutchinson (2), Murray	5,228
27	25 March	Dundee United	H	3–1	McLeod, Higgins (2)	8,354
28	29 March	Rangers	H	1–1	McLeod (pen.)	21,245
29	1 April	Partick Thistle	H	3–1	McLeod, Hutchinson, Duncan	6,210
30	5 April	Celtic	A	1–2	McLeod (pen.)	18,224
31	8 April	St Mirren	A	0–3		8,087
32	12 April	Celtic	H	1–1	Higgins	10,902
33	15 April	Celtic	H	4–1	Duncan, Higgins (2), McGhee	16,286
34	19 April	Partick Thistle	A	1–2	McGhee	2,997
35	22 April	Ayr United	A	0–2		2,558
36	29 April	Aberdeen	H	1–1	Duncan	11,530

=== Final League table ===
Pos	Team	Pld	W	D	L	GF	GA	GD	Pts	Qualification or relegation
2	Aberdeen	36	22	9	5	68	29	+39	53	Qualification for the Cup Winners' Cup first round
3	Dundee United	36	16	8	12	42	32	+10	40	Qualification for the UEFA Cup first round
4	Hibernian	36	15	7	14	51	43	+8	37	Qualification for the UEFA Cup first round
5	Celtic	36	15	6	15	63	54	+9	36	
6	Motherwell	36	13	7	16	45	52	−7	33	

Source: Statto
Rules for classification: 1) points; 2) goal difference; 3) number of goals scored.

=== Scottish League Cup ===
Round	Date	Opponent	H/A	Score	Hibernian Scorer(s)	Attendance
R1 L1	17 August	Queen of the South	H	1–2	McLeod	4,585
R1 L2	24 August	Queen of the South	A	0–0		3,362

=== Anglo-Scottish Cup ===
Round	Date	Opponent	H/A	Score	Hibernian Scorer(s)	Attendance
R1 L1		Ayr United	H	2–1	Scott, Smith	
R1 L2		Ayr United	A	2–2	Smith, Bremner	
QF L1		Blackburn Rovers	H	2–1	Mckay, McLeod	
QF L2		Blackburn Rovers	A	1–0	Higgins	
SF L1		Bristol City	H	1–1	Duncan	
SF L2		Bristol City	A	3–5	McLeod (2), Henderson	

=== Scottish Cup ===
Round	Date	Opponent	H/A	Score	Hibernian Scorer(s)	Attendance
R3	28 January	East Fife	H	4–0	McLeod (2, 1 pen.), Duncan, McGhee	7,108
R4	4 March	Partick Thistle	H	0–0		9,575
R4 R	7 March	Partick Thistle	A	1–2	McLeod	3,800

== See also ==
- List of Hibernian F.C. seasons
