= 1979 Scottish Cup final =

1979 Scottish Cup Final
- Event: 1978–79 Scottish Cup
Rangers	Hibernian
0	0
- Date: 12 May 1979
- Venue: Hampden Park, Glasgow
- Referee: Brian McGinlay
- Attendance: 50,610

Replay
Rangers	Hibernian
0	0
- Date: 16 May 1979
- Venue: Hampden Park, Glasgow
- Referee: Brian McGinlay
- Attendance: 33,504

Second Replay
Rangers	Hibernian
3	2
- Date: 28 May 1979
- Venue: Hampden Park, Glasgow
- Referee: Ian Foote
- Attendance: 30,602

The 1979 Scottish Cup Final was contested between Rangers and Hibernian. After goalless draws in the initial match and the replay, Rangers won the Cup by winning 3–2 after extra time in the second replay. The winning goal for Rangers was an own goal scored with his head by Arthur Duncan.

== Match details ==
12 May 1979

Rangers	0 – 0	Hibernian
	Report (page 24)

Hampden Park, Glasgow
Attendance: 50,610
Referee: Brian McGinlay

=== Teams ===
RANGERS:
GK	(Scotland) Peter McCloy
DF	(Scotland) Sandy Jardine
DF	(Scotland) Colin Jackson
DF	(Scotland) Derek Johnstone (c)
DF	(Scotland) Ally Dawson
MF	(Scotland) Tommy McLean
MF	(Scotland) Bobby Russell
MF	(Scotland) Alex MacDonald	Substituted off
MF	(Scotland) Davie Cooper
FW	(Scotland) Derek Parlane
FW	(Scotland) Gordon Smith
Substitutes:
MF	(Scotland) Alex Miller	Substituted on
Manager:
(Scotland) John Greig

HIBERNIAN:
GK	(Scotland) Jim McArthur
DF	(Scotland) Ally Brazil
DF	(Scotland) George Stewart
DF	(Scotland) Jackie McNamara (c)
DF	(Scotland) Arthur Duncan
MF	(Scotland) Bobby Hutchinson	Substituted off
MF	(Scotland) Des Bremner
MF	(Scotland) Ralph Callachan
MF	(Scotland) Tony Higgins
FW	(Scotland) Ally McLeod
FW	(Scotland) Colin Campbell
Substitutes:
MF	(Scotland) Gordon Rae	Substituted on
Manager:
(Scotland) Eddie Turnbull

=== Replay ===
16 May 1979

Rangers	0 – 0	Hibernian
	Report (page 20)

Hampden Park, Glasgow
Attendance: 33,504
Referee: Brian McGinlay

==== Teams ====
RANGERS:
GK	(Scotland) Peter McCloy
DF	(Scotland) Sandy Jardine
DF	(Scotland) Colin Jackson
DF	(Scotland) Derek Johnstone (c)
DF	(Scotland) Ally Dawson
MF	(Scotland) Tommy McLean	Substituted off
MF	(Scotland) Bobby Russell
MF	(Scotland) Alex MacDonald
MF	(Scotland) Davie Cooper
FW	(Scotland) Derek Parlane
FW	(Scotland) Gordon Smith
Substitutes:
MF	(Scotland) Alex Miller	Substituted on
Manager:
(Scotland) John Greig

HIBERNIAN:
GK	(Scotland) Jim McArthur
DF	(Scotland) Ally Brazil
DF	(Scotland) George Stewart
DF	(Scotland) Jackie McNamara (c)
DF	(Scotland) Arthur Duncan
MF	(Scotland) Des Bremner
MF	(Scotland) Gordon Rae
MF	(Scotland) Ralph Callachan
MF	(Scotland) Tony Higgins	Substituted off
FW	(Scotland) Ally McLeod
FW	(Scotland) Colin Campbell
Substitutes:
FW	(Scotland) Steve Brown	Substituted on
Manager:
(Scotland) Eddie Turnbull

=== Second Replay ===
28 May 1979

Rangers	3 – 2	Hibernian
Johnstone; Duncan (o.g.)	Report (page 27)	Higgins; McLeod

Hampden Park, Glasgow
Attendance: 30,602
Referee: Ian Foote

==== Teams ====
RANGERS:
GK	(Scotland) Peter McCloy
DF	(Scotland) Sandy Jardine
DF	(Scotland) Colin Jackson
DF	(Scotland) Derek Johnstone (c)
DF	(Scotland) Ally Dawson
MF	(Scotland) Tommy McLean	Substituted off
MF	(Scotland) Bobby Russell
MF	(Scotland) Kenny Watson	Substituted off
MF	(Scotland) Alex MacDonald
MF	(Scotland) Davie Cooper
FW	(Scotland) Derek Parlane
Substitutes:
MF	(Scotland) Alex Miller	Substituted on
FW	(Scotland) Gordon Smith	Substituted on
Manager:
(Scotland) John Greig

HIBERNIAN:
GK	(Scotland) Jim McArthur
DF	(Scotland) Ally Brazil
DF	(Scotland) George Stewart
DF	(Scotland) Jackie McNamara (c)
DF	(Scotland) Arthur Duncan
MF	(Scotland) Des Bremner
MF	(Scotland) Gordon Rae
MF	(Scotland) Ralph Callachan	Substituted off
MF	(Scotland) Tony Higgins	Substituted off
FW	(Scotland) Ally McLeod
FW	(Scotland) Colin Campbell
Substitutes:
MF	(Scotland) Bobby Hutchinson	Substituted on
FW	(Scotland) Steve Brown	Substituted on
Manager:
(Scotland) Eddie Turnbull
