= Mike McDonald (footballer) =

Scottish footballer (born 1950)

Personal information
- Full name: Michael Flynn McDonald
- Date of birth: 8 November 1950 (age 75)
- Place of birth: Glasgow, Scotland
- Position: Goalkeeper

Youth career
- St Roch's

Senior career*
Years	Team	Apps	(Gls)
1968–1972	Clydebank	108	(0)
1972–1974	Stoke City	5	(0)
1975–1980	Hibernian	109	(0)
1980–1981	Berwick Rangers	16	(0)
1981–1982	Hawick Royal Albert		
1982–1984	St Johnstone	42	(0)
1984–1985	Arbroath	2	(0)
Total		282	(0)

Managerial career
- Gala Fairydean
- * Club domestic league appearances and goals

Michael Flynn McDonald (born 8 November 1950) is a Scottish former footballer who played in The Football League for Stoke City as well as a number of Scottish clubs.

== Career ==
McDonald was born in Glasgow and played with St Roch's and Clydebank before joining Stoke City in 1972. His transfer to Stoke came about when, in October 1972, Stoke's World Cup-winning goalkeeper Gordon Banks was involved in a near fatal car crash which left him blind in one eye and ended his top flight career. Manager Tony Waddington wanted Scotland international Bobby Clark to be his replacement but he failed to impress the Stoke board and the move fell through. So Instead Banks' understudy John Farmer was made first choice and McDonald was brought in as his back-up. He made nine appearances for Stoke in two seasons and returned north of the border to Hibernian. He later went on to play for Berwick Rangers, Hawick Royal Albert, St Johnstone and Arbroath.

McDonald later managed Gala Fairydean. He was banned from the touchline for 18 months in April 1989 by the Scottish Football Association. In December 2014 McDonald was appointed joint-manager at non-league Congleton Town.

== Career statistics ==
Appearances and goals by club, season and competition
Club	Season	League			FA Cup		League Cup		Other		Total	
Club	Season	Division	Apps	Goals	Apps	Goals	Apps	Goals	Apps	Goals	Apps	Goals
Stoke City	1972–73	First Division	1	0	0	0	1	0	0	0	2	0
Stoke City	1973–74	First Division	4	0	0	0	1	0	2	0	7	0
Stoke City	Total		5	0	0	0	2	0	2	0	9	0
Hibernian	1975–76	Scottish Premier Division	15	0	5	0	0	0	0	0	20	0
Hibernian	1976–77	Scottish Premier Division	36	0	3	0	6	0	4	0	49	0
Hibernian	1977–78	Scottish Premier Division	36	0	3	0	2	0	6	0	47	0
Hibernian	1978–79	Scottish Premier Division	18	0	0	0	7	0	4	0	29	0
Hibernian	1979–80	Scottish Premier Division	4	0	0	0	1	0	0	0	5	0
Hibernian	Total		109	0	11	0	16	0	14	0	150	0
Career Total			114	0	11	0	18	0	16	0	159	0
