= 1988–89 Hibernian F.C. season =

Hibernian
1988–89 season
- Manager: Alex Miller
- Scottish Premier Division: 5th
- Scottish Cup: SF
- Scottish League Cup: R4
- Highest home attendance: 27,219 (v Hearts, 4 January)
- Lowest home attendance: 5670 (v Dundee, 13 May)
- Average home league attendance: 13,896 (up 2231)

The 1988–89 season saw Hibernian compete in the Scottish Premier Division, in which they finished 5th. They also competed in the Scottish Cup, where they reached the semi-finals, and the Scottish League Cup, where they were eliminated in the fourth round.

== Scottish Premier Division ==
Match Day	Date	Opponent	H/A	Score	Hibernian Scorer(s)	Attendance
1	13 August	Motherwell	H	1–0	McIntyre	10,944
2	20 August	Rangers	A	0–0		41,955
3	27 August	Heart of Midlothian	H	0–0		23,760
4	3 September	Aberdeen	A	0–0		13,583
5	17 September	Dundee United	A	1–1	Rae	11,017
6	24 September	Hamilton Academical	H	1–0	Evans	7,910
7	28 September	St Mirren	A	1–0	Evans	5,380
8	1 October	Celtic	H	3–1	Archibald (2), Evans	22,808
9	8 October	Dundee	A	1–2	Archibald	8,103
10	12 October	Rangers	H	0–1		25,692
11	22 October	Motherwell	A	1–1	McIntyre	5,904
12	29 October	Hamilton Academical	A	3–0	McCluskey, Collins, Archibald	4,569
13	2 November	Dundee United	H	1–1	McCluskey	9,492
14	5 November	Aberdeen	H	1–2	Archibald	11,576
15	12 November	Heart of Midlothian	A	2–1	Kane, Archibald	23,062
16	19 November	Celtic	A	0–1		39,926
17	26 November	Dundee	H	1–1	Archibald	8,461
18	3 December	St Mirren	H	2–0	Hunter, Archibald	8,612
19	10 December	Dundee United	A	1–4	Archibald	9,963
20	17 December	Rangers	A	0–1		36,672
21	31 December	Motherwell	H	2–0	Kane, May	9,902
22	4 January	Heart of Midlothian	H	1–0	May	27,219
23	7 January	Aberdeen	A	0–2		13,741
24	14 January	Dundee	A	2–1	Evans, Archibald	7,263
25	21 January	Celtic	H	1–3		23,106
26	21 February	St Mirren	A	1–3	Kane	4,960
27	1 March	Hamilton Academical	H	2–1	Collins, Evans	6,147
28	11 March	Motherwell	A	0–0		5,027
29	25 March	Rangers	H	0–1		23,321
30	1 April	Heart of Midlothian	A	1–2	Houchen	22,090
31	8 April	Aberdeen	H	1–2	Houchen	10,450
32	19 April	St Mirren	H	1–0	Archibald	7,379
33	22 April	Hamilton Academical	A	3–0	Archibald (2), Kane	2,975
34	29 April	Dundee United	H	1–2	McCluskey	7,683
35	6 May	Celtic	A	0–1		15,316
36	13 May	Dundee	H	1–1	Findlay	5,670

=== Final League table ===
Pos	Team	Pld	W	D	L	GF	GA	GD	Pts	Qualification or relegation
3	Celtic	36	21	4	11	66	44	+22	46	Qualification for the Cup Winners' Cup first round
4	Dundee United	36	16	12	8	44	26	+18	44	Qualification for the UEFA Cup first round
5	Hibernian	36	13	9	14	37	36	+1	35	Qualification for the UEFA Cup first round
6	Heart of Midlothian	36	9	13	14	35	42	−7	31	
7	St Mirren	36	11	7	18	39	55	−16	29	

Source: Statto
Rules for classification: 1) points; 2) goal difference; 3) number of goals scored.

=== Scottish League Cup ===
Round	Date	Opponent	H/A	Score	Hibernian Scorer(s)	Attendance
R2	17 August	Stranraer	H	4–0	Archibald (2), Kane, Evans	8,170
R3	23 August	Kilmarnock	H	1–0	Kane	9,623
R4	31 August	Aberdeen	H	1–2	Kane	15,211

=== Scottish Cup ===
Round	Date	Opponent	H/A	Score	Hibernian Scorer(s)	Attendance
R3	28 January	Brechin City	H	1–0	Collins	7,746
R4	18 February	Motherwell	H	2–1	Collins, May	12,000
R5	18 March	Alloa Athletic	H	1–0	Kane	10,500
SF	16 April	Celtic	N	1–3	Archibald	42,188

== See also ==
- List of Hibernian F.C. seasons
