= 1985 Scottish League Cup final =

- Event: 1985–86 Scottish League Cup
Aberdeen	Hibernian
3	0
- Date: 27 October 1985
- Venue: Hampden Park, Glasgow
- Referee: Bob Valentine (Dundee)
- Attendance: 40,061

The 1985 Scottish League Cup final was played on 27 October 1985, at Hampden Park in Glasgow and was the final of the 40th Scottish League Cup competition. The final was contested by Aberdeen and Hibernian. Aberdeen won the match 3–0 thanks to goals by Eric Black (2) and Billy Stark, giving Alex Ferguson his only Scottish League Cup trophy win.

== Match details ==
27 October 1985
15:00

Aberdeen	3–0	Hibernian
Black 10' 63'; Stark 12'

Hampden Park, Glasgow
Attendance: 40,061
Referee: George Smith

ABERDEEN:
GK	1	Jim Leighton
DF	2	Stewart McKimmie
DF	3	Brian Mitchell
MF	4	Billy Stark
DF	5	Alex McLeish
DF	6	Willie Miller (c)
MF	7	Eric Black
MF	8	Neil Simpson
MF	9	Frank McDougall
MF	10	Neale Cooper
FW	11	John Hewitt
Substitutes:
MF	12	Steve Gray
MF	14	Peter Weir
Manager:
Alex Ferguson

HIBERNIAN:
GK	1	Alan Rough
DF	2	Alan Sneddon
MF	3	Iain Munro
DF	4	Ally Brazil	(substituted off) ?'
DF	5	Mark Fulton
DF	6	Gordon Hunter
MF	7	Paul Kane
DF	8	Gordon Chisholm (c)
FW	9	Steve Cowan
FW	10	Gordon Durie
MF	11	Joe McBride	(substituted off) ?'
Substitutes:
MF	?	John Collins	(substituted on) ?'
FW	?	Colin Harris	(substituted on) ?'
Manager:
John Blackley
