= Bobby Flavell =

Bobby Flavell may refer to:

- Bobby Flavell (English footballer) (1956–1996)
- Bobby Flavell (Scottish footballer) (1921–2005)
