= Dundee United F.C. in the 1980s =

Scottish football club seasons

This page covers the seasons from 1980–81 to 1989–90 which saw the club win the League and the League Cup, reach three Scottish Cup finals, and the European Cup semi-finals and UEFA Cup Final.

== 1980–81 ==
The club finished the season in fifth place, missing out on European qualification through their league finish but clinching a UEFA Cup place after winning the League Cup. United also reached the final of the Scottish Cup but were beaten by Rangers after a replay. The club were knocked out of the UEFA Cup in the second round by Belgian side Lokeren.

Home colours	Away colours

Pos	Team	Pld	W	D	L	GF	GA	GD	Pts	Qualification or relegation
4	St Mirren	36	18	8	10	56	47	+9	44	
5	Dundee United	36	17	9	10	66	42	+24	43	Qualification for the UEFA Cup first round
6	Partick Thistle	36	10	10	16	32	48	−16	30	

Source: Statto
Rules for classification: 1) points; 2) goal difference; 3) number of goals scored.

== 1981–82 ==
The club finished fourth this season, reaching a third successive League Cup Final, only to be beaten at Hampden by Rangers for the second successive season. In the Scottish Cup, United were beaten in the quarter-finals by St Mirren. The club reached the UEFA Cup quarter-finals but were beaten by Yugoslavian side Radnički Niš.

Paul Sturrock was named Scottish Footballer of the Year for his performances during the season.

Home colours	Away colours

Pos	Team	Pld	W	D	L	GF	GA	GD	Pts	Qualification or relegation
3	Rangers	36	16	11	9	57	45	+12	43	Qualification for the UEFA Cup first round
4	Dundee United	36	15	10	11	61	38	+23	40	Qualification for the UEFA Cup first round
5	St Mirren	36	14	9	13	49	52	−3	37	

Source: Statto
Rules for classification: 1) points; 2) goal difference; 3) number of goals scored.

== 1982–83 ==
The club won the Premier Division this season, clinching the title on the final day by winning at Dens Park, home of rivals Dundee, and qualifying for the European Cup for the first time. In cup matters, United were beaten in the League Cup semi-finals by Celtic, and for the second season running, St Mirren knocked United out of the Scottish Cup, this time in the third round. Once again, the club reached the UEFA Cup quarter-finals, being beaten this time by Czechoslovakia side Bohemians ČKD Praha.

Home colours	Away colours

Pos	Team	Pld	W	D	L	GF	GA	GD	Pts	Qualification or relegation
1	Dundee United (C)	36	24	8	4	90	35	+55	56	Qualification for the European Cup first round
2	Celtic	36	25	5	6	90	36	+54	55	Qualification for the UEFA Cup first round
3	Aberdeen	36	25	5	6	76	25	+51	55	Qualification for the Cup Winners' Cup first round

Source: Statto
Rules for classification: 1) points; 2) goal difference; 3) number of goals scored.
(C) Champions

== 1983–84 ==
The club finished the league season in third, qualifying for the UEFA Cup. United were beaten by Aberdeen after a replay in the quarter-finals, while eventual winners Rangers knocked the club out of the League Cup in the semi-finals. In the club's inaugural European Cup campaign, United reached the semi-finals, being beaten – somewhat controversially – by Roma.

Home colours	Away colours

Pos	Team	Pld	W	D	L	GF	GA	GD	Pts	Qualification or relegation
2	Celtic	36	21	8	7	80	41	+39	50	Qualification for the Cup Winners' Cup first round
3	Dundee United	36	18	11	7	67	39	+28	47	Qualification for the UEFA Cup first round
4	Rangers	36	15	12	9	53	41	+12	42	Qualification for the UEFA Cup first round

Source: Statto
Rules for classification: 1) points; 2) goal difference; 3) number of goals scored.

== 1984–85 ==
Once again, United finished fourth, with the top four finishing in the same positions as the previous season. In the domestic cups, the club reached both finals only to be beaten by both halves of the Old Firm; in the Scottish Cup Final, Celtic triumphed 2–1 while Rangers won the League Cup 1–0. In the UEFA Cup third round, United were narrowly eliminated 5–4 on aggregate by Manchester United.

Home colours	Away colours

Pos	Team	Pld	W	D	L	GF	GA	GD	Pts	Qualification or relegation
2	Celtic	36	22	8	6	77	30	+47	52	Qualification for the Cup Winners' Cup first round
3	Dundee United	36	20	7	9	67	33	+34	47	Qualification for the UEFA Cup first round
4	Rangers	36	13	12	11	47	38	+9	38	Qualification for the UEFA Cup first round

Source: Statto
Rules for classification: 1) points; 2) goal difference; 3) number of goals scored.

== 1985–86 ==
United finished the season in third place just three points behind champions Celtic. In the domestic cups, the club reached the semi-finals of both the Scottish Cup and League Cup. In the UEFA Cup, United suffered another narrow third round exit, being beaten this time by Swiss side Neuchâtel Xamax}.

Home colours	Away colours

Pos	Team	Pld	W	D	L	GF	GA	GD	Pts	Qualification
2	Heart of Midlothian	36	20	10	6	59	33	+26	50	Qualification for the UEFA Cup first round
3	Dundee United	36	18	11	7	59	31	+28	47	Qualification for the UEFA Cup first round
4	Aberdeen	36	16	12	8	62	31	+31	44	Qualification for the Cup Winners' Cup first round

Source: Rsssf
Rules for classification: 1) points; 2) goal difference; 3) number of goals scored.

== 1986–87 ==
United finished the season in third place, nine points behind champions Rangers. The club reached the semi-finals of the League Cup, being beaten by Rangers. At the end of the season, the club played two finals in four days: the Scottish Cup Final and UEFA Cup Final. Losing the first leg of the UEFA Final in Gothenburg, United then lost the Scottish Cup in extra-time against St Mirren and could only draw at home to IFK Gothenburg four days later. The conduct of United's fans earned them the inaugural FIFA Fair Play Award.

Home colours	Away colours

Pos	Team	Pld	W	D	L	GF	GA	GD	Pts	Qualification or relegation
2	Celtic	44	27	9	8	90	41	+49	63	Qualification for the UEFA Cup first round
3	Dundee United	44	24	12	8	66	36	+30	60	Qualification for the UEFA Cup first round
4	Aberdeen	44	21	16	7	63	29	+34	58	Qualification for the UEFA Cup first round

Source: Statto
Rules for classification: 1) points; 2) goal difference; 3) number of goals scored.

== 1987–88 ==
United finished the season in fifth place, some 25 points behind champions Celtic. The club reached the quarter-finals of the League Cup, being beaten by rivals Dundee, while a second successive Scottish Cup Final appearance also resulted in a second successive defeat, this time to Celtic, where two late Frank McAvennie goals won the Cup. In the UEFA Cup, United were eliminated by TJ Vítkovice in the second round.

Home colours	Away colours

Pos	Team	Pld	W	D	L	GF	GA	GD	Pts	Qualification or relegation
4	Aberdeen	44	21	17	6	56	25	+31	59	Qualification for the UEFA Cup first round
5	Dundee United	44	16	15	13	54	47	+7	47	Qualification for the Cup Winners' Cup first round
6	Hibernian	44	12	19	13	41	42	−1	43	

Source: Statto
Rules for classification: 1) points; 2) goal difference; 3) number of goals scored.

== 1988–89 ==
United finished the season in fourth place, twelve points behind champions Rangers. The club reached the semi-finals of the League Cup, being beaten by Aberdeen, who went on to reach the final, while United were beaten in the Scottish Cup quarter-finals by eventual finalists Rangers, albeit after a replay. In the Cup Winners' Cup, United were eliminated by Dinamo Bucharest in the second round.

Home colours	Away colours

Pos	Team	Pld	W	D	L	GF	GA	GD	Pts	Qualification or relegation
3	Celtic	36	21	4	11	66	44	+22	46	Qualification for the Cup Winners' Cup first round
4	Dundee United	36	16	12	8	44	26	+18	44	Qualification for the UEFA Cup first round
5	Hibernian	36	13	9	14	37	36	+1	35	Qualification for the UEFA Cup first round

Source: Statto
Rules for classification: 1) points; 2) goal difference; 3) number of goals scored.

== 1989–90 ==
United finished the season in fourth place, sixteen points behind champions Rangers. The club were knocked out the League Cup by Hamilton Academical in the third round, while Aberdeen – who went on to win the Cup – eliminated United in the Scottish Cup semi-finals In the UEFA Cup, United were eliminated by Royal Antwerp in the second round.

Home colours	Away colours

Pos	Team	Pld	W	D	L	GF	GA	GD	Pts	Qualification or relegation
3	Heart of Midlothian	36	16	12	8	54	35	+19	44	Qualification for the UEFA Cup first round
4	Dundee United	36	11	13	12	36	39	−3	35	Qualification for the UEFA Cup first round
5	Celtic	36	10	14	12	37	37	0	34	

Source: RSSSF
Rules for classification: 1) points; 2) goal difference; 3) number of goals scored.
