= 1978–79 Scottish Cup =

Tournament details
- Country: Scotland

Final positions
- Champions: Rangers
- Runners-up: Hibernian

The 1978–79 Scottish Cup was the 94th staging of Scotland's most prestigious football knockout competition. The Cup was won by Rangers who defeated Hibernian in the twice replayed final.

== First round ==
| Home team | Score | Away team |
|---|---|---|
| Dunfermline Athletic | 2 – 2 | Albion Rovers |
| Falkirk | 2 – 0 | Keith |
| Gala Fairydean | 1 – 3 | Cowdenbeath |
| Meadowbank Thistle | 1 – 1 | Inverness Caledonian |
| Threave Rovers | 0 – 2 | East Stirlingshire |
| Vale of Leithen | 1 – 4 | Forfar Athletic |

=== Replays ===
| Home team | Score | Away team |
|---|---|---|
| Albion Rovers | 2 – 3 | Dunfermline Athletic |
| Inverness Caledonian | 0 – 3 | Meadowbank Thistle |

== Second round ==
| Home team | Score | Away team |
|---|---|---|
| Inverness Thistle | 0 – 4 | Falkirk |
| Forfar Athletic | 1 – 2 | Berwick Rangers |
| East Stirlingshire | 2 – 3 | Spartans |
| Cowdenbeath | 0 – 0 | Alloa Athletic |
| Peterhead | 2 – 3 | Queen's Park |
| East Fife | 2 – 1 | Brechin City |
| Meadowbank Thistle | 2 – 1 | Stenhousemuir |
| Stranraer | 1 – 1 | Dunfermline Athletic |

=== Replays ===
| Home team | Score | Away team |
|---|---|---|
| Dunfermline Athletic | 1 – 0 | Stranraer |
| Alloa Athletic | 2 – 0 | Cowdenbeath |

== Third round ==
| Home team | Score | Away team |
|---|---|---|
| Dundee United | 0 – 2 | St Mirren |
| Dundee | 1 – 0 | Falkirk |
| Dumbarton | 1 – 0 | Alloa Athletic |
| Greenock Morton | 1 – 1 | St Johnstone |
| Stirling Albion | 0 – 2 | Partick Thistle |
| Ayr United | 4 – 0 | Queen of the South |
| Rangers | 3 – 1 | Motherwell |
| Clyde | 1 – 5 | Kilmarnock |
| Clydebank | 3 – 3 | Queen's Park |
| Meadowbank Thistle | 2 – 1 | Spartans |
| Montrose | 2 – 4 | Celtic |
| Dunfermline Athletic | 1 – 1 | Hibernian |
| Raith Rovers | 0 – 2 | Hearts |
| Arbroath | 0 – 1 | Airdrieonians |
| East Fife | 0 – 1 | Berwick Rangers |
| Hamilton Academical | 0 – 2 | Aberdeen |

=== Replays ===
| Home team | Score | Away team |
|---|---|---|
| St Johnstone | 2 – 4 | Greenock Morton |
| Hibernian | 2 – 0 | Dunfermline Athletic |
| Queen's Park | 0 – 1 | Clydebank |

== Fourth round ==
| Home team | Score | Away team |
|---|---|---|
| Dundee | 4 – 1 | St Mirren |
| Hearts | 1 – 1 | Greenock Morton |
| Celtic | 3 – 0 | Berwick Rangers |
| Dumbarton | 3 – 1 | Clydebank |
| Partick Thistle | 3 – 0 | Airdrieonians |
| Aberdeen | 6 – 2 | Ayr United |
| Meadowbank Thistle | 0 – 6 | Hibernian |
| Rangers | 1 – 1 | Kilmarnock |

=== Replays ===
| Home team | Score | Away team |
|---|---|---|
| Greenock Morton | 0 – 1 | Hearts |
| Kilmarnock | 0 – 1 | Rangers |

== Quarter-finals ==
| Home team | Score | Away team |
|---|---|---|
| Aberdeen | 1 – 1 | Celtic |
| Dumbarton | 0 – 1 | Partick Thistle |
| Hibernian | 2 – 1 | Hearts |
| Rangers | 6 – 3 | Dundee |

=== Replay ===
| Home team | Score | Away team |
|---|---|---|
| Celtic | 1 – 2 | Aberdeen |

== Semi-finals ==
4 April 1979

| Partick Thistle | 0–0 | Rangers |

Hampden Park, Glasgow
Attendance: 26,232

11 April 1979

| Hibernian | 2–1 | Aberdeen |
|---|---|---|
| Rae 37'; McLeod 43' (pen.) | | Steve Archibald 28' |

Hampden Park, Glasgow
Attendance: 9,387
Referee: Bob Valentine

=== Replay ===
16 April 1979

| Rangers | 1–0 | Partick Thistle |

Hampden Park, Glasgow
Attendance: 32,300

== Final ==
12 May 1979

| Rangers | 0–0 | Hibernian |

Hampden Park, Glasgow
Attendance: 50,610
Referee: Brian McGinlay

=== Replay ===
16 May 1979

| Rangers | 0–0 | Hibernian |

Hampden Park, Glasgow
Attendance: 33,504
Referee: Brian McGinlay

=== Second Replay ===
28 May 1979

| Rangers | 3–2 | Hibernian |
|---|---|---|
| Johnstone; Duncan (o.g.) | | Higgins; MacLeod |

Hampden Park, Glasgow
Attendance: 30,602
Referee: Ian Foote

== Events ==
Inverness Thistle's match against Falkirk became famous in Scotland because the game was postponed 29 times, It was originally supposed to be played on 6 January in Inverness at Kingsmills Park due to ice and snow, and was eventually played on 22 February once it was deemed suitable, where Falkirk won the game 4-0, and were eventually put out by Dundee 3 days later, though it was a few postponements short of beating the record of 33 games by Airdrieonians and Stranraer set 16 years earlier due to similar circumstances during the Winter of 1962–63 in the United Kingdom where football matches were called off due to snowstorms.

== See also ==
- 1978–79 in Scottish football
- 1978–79 Scottish League Cup
