= Jim McArthur =

Scottish footballer

Personal information
- Date of birth: 27 February 1952 (age 74)
- Place of birth: Dunfermline, Scotland
- Position: Goalkeeper

Youth career
- Halbeath Boys Club

Senior career*
Years	Team	Apps	(Gls)
1967–1972	Cowdenbeath	61	(0)
1972–1983	Hibernian	217	(0)
1983	→ Meadowbank Thistle (loan)	1	(0)
1983	Cowdenbeath	1	(0)
1983	Greenock Morton	3	(0)
1983–1984	Raith Rovers	12	(0)
Total		295	(0)
- * Club domestic league appearances and goals

Jim McArthur (born 27 February 1952) is a Scottish former football goalkeeper, who played for Hibernian for the majority of his career. He appeared in 296 Scottish Football League and cup games for the club. He played in the 1974 Scottish League Cup Final and the twice-replayed 1979 Scottish Cup Final.

Since retiring as a player, McArthur has become a licensed agent, having represented many players, such as Colin Cameron, Paul Ritchie, Jonathan Gould, Keith Wright, David Robertson, and Russell Latapy.
