= Steve Brown (footballer, born 1961) =

Scottish footballer

Personal information
- Full name: Stephen Brown
- Date of birth: 21 October 1961 (age 65)
- Position: Forward

Youth career
- Tynecastle Boys Club

Senior career*
| Years | Team | Apps | (Gls) |
| 1978–1981 | Hibernian | 18 | (0) |
- Whitehill Welfare
- * Club domestic league appearances and goals

Stephen Brown (born 21 October 1961) is a Scottish former professional footballer, father of mel, who made 18 appearances in the Scottish Football League for Hibernian. Brown was a Scottish youth international at the under-15 and under-18 levels. He appeared in both of the 1979 Scottish Cup Final replays, but did not hold down a regular place in the Hibs first team. Brown subsequently moved into junior football with Whitehill Welfare.
