= Paul Kane (footballer) =

Scottish footballer

Personal information
- Full name: Paul James Kane
- Date of birth: 20 August 1965 (age 61)
- Place of birth: Edinburgh, Scotland
- Height: 5 ft 9 in (1.75 m)
- Position: Midfielder

Youth career
- Salvesen Boys' Club

Senior career*
Years	Team	Apps	(Gls)
1982–1990	Hibernian	247	(34)
1990–1991	Oldham Athletic	21	(0)
1991–1996	Aberdeen	119	(11)
1995–1996	→ Barnsley (loan)	4	(0)
1996	Viking	15	(3)
1997–2002	St Johnstone	138	(6)
2002–2003	Clyde	20	(1)
Total		564	(55)
- * Club domestic league appearances and goals

Paul James Kane (born 20 June 1965) is a Scottish former professional footballer who played mainly for Hibernian, Aberdeen and St Johnstone.

== Club career ==
A midfielder, Kane began his career with Hibernian in 1982. In eight years at Easter Road he made 292 total appearances and scored 42 goals, and played on the losing side in the 1985 Scottish League Cup Final, aged 20. In January 1991 he joined Oldham Athletic and went on to make 21 appearances for the Boundary Park club.

His next move, in November 1991, was to Aberdeen. In four years with the Dons he made 141 total appearances, finding the net on 13 occasions. He played in three major cup semi-finals, losing two and beating former club Hibs in the other (in the 1992–93 Scottish Cup), but was then not selected for the final. After a loan spell at Barnsley, Kane joined Norwegian club Viking in 1996 under the Bosman ruling. He became the first British footballer to move under freedom of contract without incurring a transfer fee.

In 1997, Kane returned to Scotland to join St Johnstone, playing in the Scottish Premier League until the age of 36. In five years with the Saints, he made 138 league appearances and scored six goals. His final club was Clyde, who he played for from 2002 until his retirement twelve months later.

== After retirement ==
Since retiring from football, Kane has been running a pub business, while attending Hibernian games regularly.

== Career statistics ==
=== Club ===
Appearances and goals by club, season and competition
Club	Season	League			National Cup		League Cup		Europe		Total	
Club	Season	Division	Apps	Goals	Apps	Goals	Apps	Goals	Apps	Goals	Apps	Goals
Hibernian	1983-84	Scottish Premier Division	13	1	2	0	4	0	0	0	19	1
Hibernian	1984-85	Scottish Premier Division	34	9	1	0	2	0	0	0	37	9
Hibernian	1985-86	Scottish Premier Division	32	5	2	0	4	0	0	0	38	5
Hibernian	1986-87	Scottish Premier Division	37	1	1	1	3	1	0	0	41	3
Hibernian	1987-88	Scottish Premier Division	44	10	4	0	3	2	0	0	51	12
Hibernian	1988-89	Scottish Premier Division	35	5	4	1	3	3	0	0	42	9
Hibernian	1989-90	Scottish Premier Division	31	3	3	0	3	0	4	0	41	3
Hibernian	1990-91	Scottish Premier Division	21	0	0	0	2	0	0	0	23	0
Hibernian	Total		247	34	17	2	24	6	4	0	292	42
Oldham Athletic	1990-91	Second Division	21	0	-	-	-	-	-	-	21+	0+
Oldham Athletic	Total		21	0	-	-	-	-	-	-	21+	0+
Aberdeen	1991–92	Scottish Premier Division	25	2	1	0	0	0	0	0	26	2
Aberdeen	1992–93	Scottish Premier Division	27	4	2	0	1	0	0	0	30	4
Aberdeen	1993–94	Scottish Premier Division	39	3	5	0	3	0	4	0	51	3
Aberdeen	1994–95	Scottish Premier Division	28	2	2	0	3	1	1	1	34	4
Aberdeen	1995-96	Scottish Premier Division	0	0	0	0	0	0	0	0	0	0
Aberdeen	Total		119	11	10	0	7	1	5	1	141	13
Barnsley (loan)	1995-96	First Division	4	0	0	0	0	0	-	-	4	0
Viking FK	1996	Tippeligaen	15	3	-	-	-	-	-	-	15+	3+
Viking FK	Total		15	3	-	-	-	-	-	-	15+	3+
St Johnstone	1997-98	Scottish Premier Division	27	1	3	0	2	0	0	0	32	1
St Johnstone	1998-99	SPL	34	3	4	0	4	1	0	0	42	4
St Johnstone	1999-00	SPL	34	1	1	0	1	0	4	0	40	1
St Johnstone	2000-01	SPL	28	1	2	0	1	0	0	0	31	1
St Johnstone	2001-02	SPL	15	0	1	0	0	0	0	0	16	0
St Johnstone	Total		138	6	11	0	8	1	4	0	161	7
Clyde	2001-02	Scottish First Division	5	0	0	0	0	0	-	-	5	0
Clyde	2002-03	Scottish First Division	15	1	2	0	0	0	-	-	17	1
Clyde	Total		20	1	2	0	0	0	-	-	22	1
Career total			564	55	40+	2+	39+	8+	13	1	656+	66+

== Honours ==
Oldham Athletic

- Football League Second Division: 1990–91

== See also ==
- List of footballers in Scotland by number of league appearances (500+)
- List of Hibernian F.C. players
