= Colin Campbell (footballer, born 1956) =

Scottish footballer

Personal information
- Full name: Colin Campbell
- Date of birth: 1 December 1956 (age 69)
- Place of birth: Benbecula, Scotland
- Position: Midfielder

Senior career*
Years	Team	Apps	(Gls)
- Benbecula
- Harris
- Edinburgh University
1978–1980	Hibernian	38	(5)
1980–1981	Dundee United	4	(0)
1981–1983	Airdrieonians	35	(1)
1983–1984	Meadowbank Thistle	23	(3)
- Spartans
Total		100	(9)
- * Club domestic league appearances and goals

Colin Campbell (born 1 December 1956) is a Scottish retired footballer who played as a midfielder. He played in the Scottish Football League for Hibernian, Dundee United, Airdrieonians and Meadowbank Thistle.

== Career ==
Campbell was born on the island of Benbecula in the Outer Hebrides. He began his football career in local amateur football, making his debut for the Benbecula team aged just ten. He later played for Harris and helped them to the Lewis and Harris Football League title in 1978. By this time Campbell was a student at the University of Edinburgh and while playing for the university football team he was recommended to Hibernian, signing for them in the summer of 1978. Making his debut in October that year, Campbell finished the season with a Scottish Cup runners-up medal. Hibs lost the 1979 Scottish Cup Final in a twice-replayed final against Rangers. In the first final, which ended goalless, Campbell was blatantly fouled in the penalty box by Rangers goalkeeper Peter McCloy. Campbell unsuccessfully attempted to retrieve the ball instead of appealing for a penalty, and the referee chose not to award one.

After a second season with Hibs ended in relegation, Campbell moved to Dundee United. He played just four times during the 1980-81 season, after which Campbell left United. He then moved to Airdrieonians and, despite being in the Premier Division, dropped down to part-time football to combine working in his own sports shop. A short spell with Meadowbank Thistle followed before he "more or less stopped playing at 28", although he did subsequently appear for Spartans in the East of Scotland Football League.

== Honours ==
- Scottish Cup Runner-up: 1

1978–79
