= Bobby Torrance =

Scottish footballer

Personal information
- Date of birth: 12 August 1958 (age 68)
- Place of birth: Glasgow, Scotland
- Position: Forward

Youth career
- Drumchapel Amateurs

Senior career*
Years	Team	Apps	(Gls)
1976–1980	St Mirren	59	(22)
1980–1981	Hibernian	13	(1)
1981	Partick Thistle	9	(0)
1981–1984	Stirling Albion	79	(25)
1984–1986	Brechin City	25	(3)
1986–1987	Arbroath	48	(18)
1987–1988	Alloa Athletic	11	(2)
Total		244	(71)
- * Club domestic league appearances and goals

Bobby Torrance (born 12 August 1958) is a Scottish footballer.
