= Robert Dawson (footballer) =

Scottish footballer (born 1963)

Robert Dawson (born 1 August 1963) is a Scottish former footballer, who played for Stirling Albion, St Mirren and Clyde. Dawson was part of the St Mirren team that won against Scottish champions Rangers in August 1989.
