= Terry Wilson (footballer, born 1959) =

Scottish footballer

Personal information
- Date of birth: 20 December 1959 (age 66)
- Place of birth: Dunfermline, Scotland
- Position: Winger

Youth career
- Aston Villa

Senior career*
Years	Team	Apps	(Gls)
1977–1978	Cowdenbeath	16	(2)
1978–1980	Arbroath	61	(10)
1980–1981	Hibernian	7	(1)
1981	Dunfermline Athletic	8	(0)
1981–1983	Hamilton Academical	34	(4)
1983	Dunfermline Athletic	11	(0)
- Bromsgrove Rovers
Total		137	(17)
- * Club domestic league appearances and goals

Terry Wilson (born 20 December 1959) is a Scottish footballer who played as a winger for Cowdenbeath, Arbroath, Hibernian, Dunfermline Athletic and Hamilton Academical. He was born in Dunfermline.
