= Mark Fulton =

Scottish footballer

Personal information
- Date of birth: 16 September 1959 (age 67)
- Place of birth: Johnstone, Scotland
- Position: Defender

Youth career
- Johnstone Burgh
- 1977–1979: St Mirren

Senior career*
Years	Team	Apps	(Gls)
1979–1985	St Mirren	160	(6)
1985–1987	Hibernian	39	(0)
1987–1988	Hamilton Academical	19	(0)

International career
1979–1980	Scotland U21	5	(0)
1980	Scottish League XI	1	(0)
- * Club domestic league appearances and goals

Mark Fulton (born 16 September 1959 in Johnstone) is a Scottish former professional footballer who played for St Mirren, Hibernian and Hamilton Academical.

Fulton was outstanding as a young player at St Mirren, and was selected five times by the Scotland national under-21 football team. Fulton also represented the Scottish League once, in 1980. After making 160 league appearances for St Mirren, Fulton transferred to Hibernian in 1985. He made 30 league appearances for Hibs in his debut season and played in the 1985 Scottish League Cup Final. He fell out of favour at Easter Road in the following season and transferred to Hamilton Academical. He left the senior game after just over a year with the Accies.

He later became a police officer.
