= Bobby Flavell (English footballer) =

English footballer

Personal information
- Full name: Robert William Flavell
- Date of birth: 7 March 1956
- Place of birth: Berwick-upon-Tweed, England
- Date of death: 11 December 1995 (aged 39)
- Place of death: Dalkeith, Scotland
- Height: 5 ft 7 in (1.70 m)
- Positions: Full back; midfielder

Senior career*
Years	Team	Apps	(Gls)
1973–1975	Burnley	0	(0)
1975–1978	Halifax Town	91	(7)
1978–1979	Chesterfield	29	(2)
1979–1980	Barnsley	25	(0)
1980	Halifax Town	1	(0)
1980	Västerås SK		
1981–1982	Hibernian	36	(3)
1982–1983	Motherwell	31	(6)
1983	Dundee United	1	(0)
1983–1985	Berwick Rangers	35	(1)
1985–1988	Newtongrange Star		
Total		249	(19)
- * Club domestic league appearances and goals

Robert William Flavell (7 March 1956 – 11 December 1995) was an English professional footballer. He was born in Berwick-upon-Tweed, Northumberland. Flavell made nearly 250 league appearances during spells with a number of British clubs.
