= Craig Paterson =

Scottish footballer (born 1959)

Personal information
- Full name: Craig Paterson
- Date of birth: 2 October 1959 (age 67)
- Place of birth: South Queensferry, Scotland
- Height: 1.83 m (6 ft 0 in)
- Position: Defender

Youth career
- Bonnyrigg Rose Athletic

Senior career*
Years	Team	Apps	(Gls)
1979–1982	Hibernian	104	(4)
1982–1986	Rangers	83	(4)
1986–1991	Motherwell	158	(9)
1991–1994	Kilmarnock	55	(1)
1995–1996	Hamilton Academical	9	(0)
Total		409	(18)

International career
1980–1982	Scotland U21	2	(0)
- * Club domestic league appearances and goals

Craig Paterson (born 2 October 1959) is a Scottish former football player, who works as a pundit for BBC Radio Scotland and Sportscene.

The son of former Hibernian defender Jock Paterson, Paterson also played for the Edinburgh club until he was signed by Rangers for £200,000 in August 1982. He later played for Motherwell, Kilmarnock and Hamilton Academical, before ending his playing career at Scottish Junior club Glenafton from New Cumnock.

Paterson captained Rangers in the 1984/85 Scottish League Cup final and won the 1990–91 Scottish Cup with Motherwell. He has worked in the Scottish sports media since his retirement, initially with Radio Forth, before joining the BBC.
