= Joe Tortolano =

Scottish footballer

Personal information
- Full name: Joseph Tortolano
- Date of birth: 6 April 1966 (age 60)
- Place of birth: Stirling, Scotland
- Positions: Left back; left midfielder

Youth career
- 1984–1985: West Bromwich Albion

Senior career*
Years	Team	Apps	(Gls)
1985–1996	Hibernian	222	(13)
1996–1997	Falkirk	12	(0)
1997–1998	Clyde	21	(0)
1998–1999	ÍR	16	(0)
1999–2000	Stirling Albion	27	(0)
2000–2001	East Stirlingshire	11	(0)
Total		309	(13)

International career
1986	Scotland U21	2	(0)
- * Club domestic league appearances and goals

Joseph Tortolano (born 6 April 1966) is a Scottish retired professional footballer who played in England, Scotland, and Iceland, making over 300 league appearances.

== Career ==
=== Club career ===
Born in Stirling, Tortolano played for West Bromwich Albion, Hibernian, Falkirk, Clyde, ÍR, Stirling Albion and East Stirlingshire.

The bulk of Tortolano's career was spent at Hibernian, where he became somewhat of a cult figure during his eleven-year spell. The player admitted that the harsh criticism he received from supporters over the course of several years of poor performances eventually inspired him to improve his fitness in the early 1990s.

While playing for Hibs in Gordon Rae's testimonial match against Manchester United in October 1988, Tortolano was sent off for a mistimed tackle on Gordon Strachan.

Tortolano retired as a player in 2001, and joined the Cowdenbeath coaching staff.

=== International career ===
Tortolano represented the Scotland national under-21 football team, but never played for the Scottish senior team.
