= Derek Rodier =

Scottish footballer (born 1959)

Personal information
- Date of birth: 4 February 1959 (age 67)
- Place of birth: Edinburgh, Scotland
- Position: Right back

Senior career*
Years	Team	Apps	(Gls)
1979–1983	Hibernian	31	(0)
1983–1984	Dunfermline Athletic	32	(1)
1984–1985	Berwick Rangers	44	(3)
Total		107	(4)
- * Club domestic league appearances and goals

Derek Rodier (born 4 February 1959 in Edinburgh) is a Scottish former footballer who played for Hibernian, Dunfermline Athletic and Berwick Rangers.
