= 1980–81 in Scottish football =

Season overview in Scottish football

Premier Division champions
- Celtic

Division One champions
- Hibernian

Division Two champions
- Queen's Park

Scottish Cup winners
- Rangers

League Cup winners
- Dundee United

Junior Cup winners
- Pollok

Teams in Europe
- Aberdeen, Celtic, Dundee United, Rangers

Scotland national team
- 1981 BHC, 1982 World Cup qualification
- ← 1979–80 1981–82 →

The 1980–81 season was the 108th season of competitive football in Scotland and the 84th season of Scottish league football.

== Scottish Premier Division ==
Pos	Team	Pld	W	D	L	GF	GA	GD	Pts	Qualification or relegation
1	Celtic (C)	36	26	4	6	84	37	+47	56	Qualification for the European Cup first round
2	Aberdeen	36	19	11	6	61	26	+35	49	Qualification for the UEFA Cup first round
3	Rangers	36	16	12	8	60	32	+28	44	Qualification for the Cup Winners' Cup first round
4	St Mirren	36	18	8	10	56	47	+9	44	
5	Dundee United	36	17	9	10	66	42	+24	43	Qualification for the UEFA Cup first round
6	Partick Thistle	36	10	10	16	32	48	−16	30	
7	Airdrieonians	36	10	9	17	36	55	−19	29	
8	Morton	36	10	8	18	36	58	−22	28	
9	Kilmarnock (R)	36	5	9	22	23	65	−42	19	Relegation to the 1981–82 Scottish First Division
10	Heart of Midlothian (R)	36	6	6	24	27	71	−44	18	Relegation to the 1981–82 Scottish First Division

Source: Statto
Rules for classification: 1) points; 2) goal difference; 3) number of goals scored.
(C) Champions; (R) Relegated

Champions: Celtic
Relegated: Kilmarnock, Hearts

== Scottish League Division One ==
Pos	Team	Pld	W	D	L	GF	GA	GD	Pts	Promotion or relegation
1	Hibernian (C, P)	39	24	9	6	67	24	+43	57	Promotion to the Premier Division
2	Dundee (P)	39	22	8	9	64	40	+24	52	Promotion to the Premier Division
3	St Johnstone	39	21	10	8	64	44	+20	52	
4	Raith Rovers	39	20	10	9	49	32	+17	50	
5	Motherwell	39	19	11	9	65	51	+14	49	
6	Ayr United	39	17	11	11	59	42	+17	45	
7	Hamilton Academical	39	15	7	17	61	57	+4	37	
8	Dumbarton	39	13	11	15	49	50	−1	37	
9	Falkirk	39	13	8	18	39	52	−13	34	
10	Clydebank	39	10	13	16	48	59	−11	33	
11	East Stirlingshire	39	6	16	17	39	57	−18	28	
12	Dunfermline Athletic	39	10	7	22	41	58	−17	27	
13	Stirling Albion (R)	39	6	11	22	19	48	−29	23	Relegation to the Second Division
14	Berwick Rangers (R)	39	5	11	23	30	82	−52	21	Relegation to the Second Division

Source: RSSSF
Rules for classification: 1) points; 2) goal difference; 3) number of goals scored.
(C) Champions; (P) Promoted; (R) Relegated

Promoted: Hibernian, Dundee
Relegated: Stirling Albion, Berwick Rangers

== Scottish League Division Two ==
Pos	Team	Pld	W	D	L	GF	GA	GD	Pts	Promotion
1	Queen's Park (C, P)	39	16	18	5	62	43	+19	50	Promotion to the First Division
2	Queen of the South (P)	39	16	14	9	66	53	+13	46	Promotion to the First Division
3	Cowdenbeath	39	18	9	12	63	48	+15	45	
4	Brechin City	39	15	14	10	52	46	+6	44	
5	Forfar Athletic	39	17	9	13	63	57	+6	43	
6	Alloa Athletic	39	15	12	12	61	54	+7	42	
7	Montrose	39	16	8	15	66	55	+11	40	
8	Clyde	39	14	12	13	68	63	+5	40	
9	Arbroath	39	13	12	14	58	54	+4	38	
10	Stenhousemuir	39	13	11	15	63	58	+5	37	
11	East Fife	39	10	15	14	44	53	−9	35	
12	Albion Rovers	39	13	9	17	59	72	−13	35	
13	Meadowbank Thistle	39	11	7	21	42	64	−22	29	
14	Stranraer	39	7	8	24	36	83	−47	22	

Source: "1980-1981 Second Division - SPFL Archive". SPFL.
Rules for classification: 1) points; 2) goal difference; 3) number of goals scored.
(C) Champions; (P) Promoted

Promoted: Queen's Park, Queen of the South

== Cup honours ==
Competition	Winner	Score	Runner-up
Scottish Cup 1980–81	Rangers	4 – 1 (rep.)	Dundee United
League Cup 1980–81	Dundee United	3 – 0	Dundee
Junior Cup	Pollok	1 – 0	Arthurlie

== Other honours ==
=== National ===
Competition	Winner	Score	Runner-up
Scottish Qualifying Cup – North	Inverness Caledonian	2 – 1 †	Elgin City
Scottish Qualifying Cup – South	Hawick Royal Albert	3 – 1 *	Gala Fairydean

=== County ===
Competition	Winner	Score	Runner-up
Aberdeenshire Cup	Aberdeen		
Ayrshire Cup	Kilmarnock	2 – 0 *	Ayr United
East of Scotland Shield	Berwick Rangers	6 – 1	Meadowbank Thistle
Fife Cup	Raith Rovers	2 – 0 *	Dunfermline Athletic
Glasgow Cup	Partick Thistle	1 – 0	Celtic
Lanarkshire Cup	Motherwell		Airdrie
Renfrewshire Cup	Morton	2 – 2 *‡	St Mirren
Stirlingshire Cup	Dumbarton	3 – 0	Stirling Albion

^{*} – aggregate over two legs
† – replay
‡ – won on penalties

=== Highland League ===
Top Three
Pos	Team	Pld	W	D	L	GF	GA	GD	Pts
1	Keith	30	17	8	5	52	26	+26	42
2	Fraserburgh	30	17	7	6	55	31	+24	41
3	Elgin City	30	17	6	7	63	32	+31	40

== Individual honours ==
Award	Winner	Club
Footballer of the Year	(Scotland) Alan Rough	Partick Thistle
Players' Player of the Year	(Scotland) Mark McGhee	Aberdeen
Young Player of the Year	(Scotland) Charlie Nicholas	Celtic

== Scottish national team ==
Date	Venue	Opponents	Score	Competition	Scotland scorer(s)
10 September	Solna Stadion, Stockholm (A)	Sweden	1–0	WCQG6	Gordon Strachan
15 October	Hampden Park, Glasgow (H)	Portugal	0–0	WCQG6	
25 February	Ramat Gan Stadium (A)	Israel	1–0	WCQG6	Kenny Dalglish
25 March	Hampden Park, Glasgow (H)	Northern Ireland	1–1	WCQG6	John Wark
28 April	Hampden Park, Glasgow (H)	Israel	3–1	WCQG6	John Robertson (2, 1 pen.), Davie Provan
16 May	Vetch Field, Swansea (A)	Wales	0–2	BHC	
19 May	Hampden Park, Glasgow (H)	Northern Ireland	2–0	BHC	Ray Stewart, Steve Archibald
23 May	Wembley Stadium, London (A)	England	1–0	BHC	John Robertson

Key:

- (H) = Home match
- (A) = Away match
- WCQG6 = World Cup qualifying – Group 6
- BHC = British Home Championship

== See also ==
- 1980–81 Aberdeen F.C. season
- 1980–81 Hibernian F.C. season
- 1980–81 Rangers F.C. season
