= Colin Harris (footballer) =

Scottish footballer

Personal information
- Date of birth: 22 February 1961 (age 64)
- Place of birth: Sanquhar, Scotland
- Position(s): Forward

Senior career*
Years	Team	Apps	(Gls)
1979–1983	Raith Rovers	106	(32)
1983–1984	Dundee	28	(3)
1984–1986	Hibernian	26	(4)
1986–1988	Raith Rovers	93	(50)
1988–1993	Hamilton Academical	159	(41)
1993–1994	Cowdenbeath	15	(1)
1994–1995	Clydebank	28	(1)
1995	Meadowbank Thistle	6	(1)
1995–1996	Queen of the South	33	(9)
- *Club domestic league appearances and goals

Colin Harris (born 22 February 1961 in Sanquhar) is a Scottish former professional association football player, who played for several clubs, most notably Raith Rovers, Hibernian and Hamilton Academical.

Harris played for Hibs in the 1985 Scottish League Cup Final, but he was not a successful signing for John Blackley. Alex Miller allowed Harris to return to Raith in 1986. He scored 50 goals in 93 league games in his second spell at Raith, before he enjoyed a successful spell with Hamilton. Harris won two Scottish Challenge Cup winners' medals, and he scored the winning goal in one of those finals. Harris was normally played as a striker, but he was also capable of playing in goal, and he did so for Hamilton.

The Sanqhuar born striker spent a season at Palmerston Park for Queen of the South making twenty-eight appearances and nine as a substitute scoring a total of ten goals in the process.

On 9 November 2015, Harris was inducted into the Raith Rovers FC Hall of Fame.
