= Willie Irvine (footballer, born 1956) =

Scottish footballer

Personal information
- Date of birth: 26 May 1956 (age 70)
- Place of birth: Whitburn, Scotland
- Position: Striker

Youth career
- 1972–1975: Celtic
- 1975–1977: Fauldhouse United

Senior career*
Years	Team	Apps	(Gls)
1977–1979	Alloa Athletic	54	(17)
1979–1982	Motherwell	121	(49)
1982–1986	Hibernian	88	(25)
1986	→ Falkirk (loan)	8	(0)
1986–1987	Ayr United	20	(6)
Total		291	(97)
- * Club domestic league appearances and goals

Willie Irvine (born 26 May 1956) is a Scottish former professional footballer. Irvine, a direct, left-sided forward, started his senior career with Celtic, but failed to break into the first team. After playing in junior football for a spell, he signed for Alloa Athletic. His play for Alloa quickly attracted the attention of Motherwell, who paid £25,000 to Alloa for his services in 1979.

Irvine had a successful spell with Motherwell, as he was their top scorer with 21 goals during their promotion season of 1981–82. Like his manager Davie Hay, Irvine left Motherwell soon after that success, choosing to join Hibs. Irvine was also initially successful with the Edinburgh club, forming a strike partnership with Bobby Thomson that led to him being the second top goalscorer in the Scottish Premier Division in 1983–84. After this, however, Irvine enjoyed less success, and he was loaned out to Falkirk before joining Ayr United.
