= Jackie McNamara Sr. =

Scottish footballer

Jackie McNamara
Personal information
- Full name: John McNamara
- Date of birth: 19 September 1952 (age 74)
- Place of birth: Glasgow, Scotland
- Position: Central defender

Youth career
- –1973: Cumbernauld United

Senior career*
| Years | Team | Apps | (Gls) |
| 1973–1976 | Celtic | 21 | (1) |
| 1976–1985 | Hibernian | 236 | (2) |
| 1985–1988 | Greenock Morton | 57 | (2) |
| Total | | 314 | (5) |

International career
| 1980 | Scottish Football League XI | 1 | (1) |
- * Club domestic league appearances and goals

John "Jackie" McNamara (born 19 September 1952 in Glasgow) is a Scottish retired professional footballer who played for Cumbernauld United, Celtic, Hibernian and Greenock Morton. His son, Jackie McNamara, was also a professional footballer.

== Career ==
McNamara started his professional career with Celtic; he was transferred to Hibernian during 1976 in exchange for Hibs legend Pat Stanton. The transfer was "roundly condemned" by the Hibs fans at the time, but McNamara proved a great servant for Hibs, particularly when he moved into defence after the sale of John Blackley. McNamara played in over 200 league games for Hibs, and was awarded a testimonial match against Newcastle United in August 1984.

McNamara was assistant manager to Jim Duffy at Hibernian during the late 1990s. McNamara left the club after Duffy was sacked in February 1998, with the team bottom of the Scottish Premier Division and heading for relegation.

The last inter-league match with a Scottish League XI side, McNamara captained the team against the Irish League XI in 1980.

== Honours ==
Cumbernauld United

- Central Junior League: 1970–71

Greenock Morton

- Scottish First Division: 1986–87
