= Steve Cowan =

Scottish footballer

Personal information
- Full name: Steven Cowan
- Date of birth: 17 February 1963 (age 63)
- Place of birth: Paisley, Scotland
- Height: 5 ft 11 in (1.80 m)
- Position: Striker

Youth career
- St Mirren

Senior career*
Years	Team	Apps	(Gls)
1979–1985	Aberdeen	42	(11)
1985–1987	Hibernian	64	(23)
1987–1990	Motherwell	51	(11)
1989–1990	→ Albion Rovers (loan)	6	(2)
1989–1990	→ Portadown (loan)	8	(7)
1990–1993	Portadown	79	(59)
1993	Ballymena United	4	(0)
1993	Cliftonville	3	(1)

International career
	Scotland U18	3	(0)
- * Club domestic league appearances and goals

Steven Cowan (born 17 February 1963) is a Scottish former professional footballer.

== Career ==
Born in Paisley and raised in East Kilbride, Cowan began his career with St Mirren, but followed Alex Ferguson to Aberdeen in 1979. Cowan was with Aberdeen for six seasons but was never a regular in what was a very strong team. He then moved to Hibernian, scoring three hat-tricks and 19 league goals in all during the 1985–86 season. He was the top goalscorer in Scotland during that season, with 28 goals in total.

Cowan scored four league goals in 1986–87 before transferring to Motherwell. He then had a loan spell at Albion Rovers before moving to Northern Irish football with Portadown. Cowan was very productive at Portadown, scoring 66 league goals in 87 games, and winning three major honours including the Irish League in 1990 and 1991 as well as the Irish Cup in 1991 where he scored his famous goal as Portadown completed a domestic double. He left Portadown in 1993, and had short stints with Linlithgow Rose, Ballymena United and Cliftonville before ending his playing career after the 1994–95 season.

Cowan now works in financial services and also as a match analyst for Radio Forth. He is also the co host for The Big Scottish Football Podcast, replacing Ewen Cameron.

== Honours ==
Aberdeen

- Scottish Premier League: 1984–85
- Drybrough Cup: 1980

Hibernian

- Scottish League Cup: Runner-Up 1985–86

Portadown

- Irish League Champion: 1989–90; 1990–91
- Irish Cup Winner: 1990–91
  - Runner-Up: 1989–90

Individual

- Ulster Footballer of the Year: 1992–93
