= Gordon Durie =

Scottish footballer and manager

Personal information
- Full name: Gordon Scott Durie
- Date of birth: 6 December 1965 (age 60)
- Place of birth: Paisley, Scotland
- Height: 1.78 m (5 ft 10 in)
- Position: Striker

Senior career*
Years	Team	Apps	(Gls)
1981–1984	East Fife	81	(26)
1984–1986	Hibernian	47	(14)
1986–1991	Chelsea	123	(51)
1991–1993	Tottenham Hotspur	58	(11)
1993–2000	Rangers	125	(44)
2000–2001	Heart of Midlothian	16	(3)
Total		450	(149)

International career
1987–1998	Scotland	43	(7)

Managerial career
- 2012: East Fife
- 2014–2015: Rangers (assistant)
- * Club domestic league appearances and goals

Gordon Scott Durie (born 6 December 1965) is a Scottish former professional football player and coach. He was a utility player who usually played as a striker for East Fife, Hibernian, Chelsea, Tottenham Hotspur, Rangers and Hearts. He was also capped 43 times by Scotland. After retiring as a player in 2001, in 2010, he became a coach and manager, working for East Fife and Rangers as an assistant.

== Playing career ==
Durie started his senior career with East Fife, and he then moved to Hibernian in 1984; while still in his teens, he played on the losing side in the 1985 Scottish League Cup final with Hibs, who sold him to Chelsea for £400,000 in 1986.

His spell with Chelsea from 1986 to 1991, yielded 63 goals in total from 153 appearances, and they won the Football League Second Division in 1989. in 1991, Durie moved to Tottenham Hotspur for a £2.2 million fee. Durie scored on his debut in a 3–2 away win at The Dell versus Southampton. He was also their first goalscorer in the Premier League, in a 2–2 home draw with Crystal Palace on 22 August 1992.

The forward then joined boyhood favourites Rangers in November 1993 and Durie played a major role in winning the last four of their 'nine in a row' of Scottish league championships and playing a handful of matches in two later title wins. Durie scored a hat-trick in the 1996 Scottish Cup final to help Rangers beat Hearts 5–1 and collected runners-up medals in the competition in 1994 and 1998; he was a Scottish League Cup winner in 1998.

Durie left Rangers at the end of the 1999–2000 season after 179 appearances and 52 goals. After turning down an offer from Australia, Durie signed for Hearts in September 2000. He stayed there for the rest of the 2000–01 season, after which he retired from playing.

=== International career ===
Durie made his international debut for Scotland on 11 November 1987, in a 1–0 against Bulgaria. He was capped 43 times in all, scoring seven goals. He was one of Scotland's bright spots in their team at Euro '96. And Durie scored the second goal in a 2–0 win against Latvia that clinched qualification for the 1998 FIFA World Cup. The last time he played for the Scottish team was during that World Cup, in a 3–0 defeat against Morocco.

== Coaching career ==
Durie was appointed assistant manager of East Fife in November 2010. On 1 March 2012, he was made caretaker manager at Bayview following the departure of John Robertson. Durie took the job on a longer-term basis, but then suffered from ill health. He resigned in November 2012, due to this illness.

Durie joined the Rangers coaching staff in July 2013, to work with the reserve and under-20 teams. He was promoted to a first team coaching role in December 2014, following the departure of manager Ally McCoist. Durie left Rangers in July 2015, as new manager Mark Warburton made changes to the coaching staff.

== Personal life ==
His son, Scott, was a youth player at Rangers and signed for East Fife in 2010.

Durie was declared bankrupt in 2016, due to a failed investment in a film production company.

== Career statistics ==
=== International ===
Scores and results list Scotland's goal tally first.

#	Date	Venue	Opponent	Score	Result	Competition
1	6 September 1989	Maksimir Stadion, Zagreb	Yugoslavia	1–0	1–3	WCQG5
2	1 May 1991	Stadio Olimpico, Serravalle	San Marino	2–0	2–0	ECQG2
3	11 September 1991	Wankdorf Stadion, Bern	Switzerland	1–2	2–2	ECQG2
4	13 November 1991	Hampden Park, Glasgow	San Marino	3–0	4–0	ECQG2
5	26 May 1996	Veteran's Stadium, New Britain CT	United States	1–0	1–2	Friendly
6	11 October 1997	Celtic Park, Glasgow	Latvia	2–0	2–0	WCQG4
7	12 November 1997	Stade Geoffroy-Guichard, St Etienne	France	1–1	1–2	Friendly

== Honours ==
Chelsea

- Football League Second Division: 1988–89
- Full Members' Cup: 1989–90

Rangers

- Scottish Premier Division/Scottish Premier League: 1993–94, 1994–95, 1995–96, 1996–97, 1998–99, 1999–2000
- Scottish Cup: 1995–96
- Scottish League Cup: 1998–99

Individual

- PFA Team of the Year: 1988–89 Second Division
