= Eddie May (Scottish footballer) =

Scottish footballer and coach (born 1967)

Personal information
- Full name: Edward Skillion May
- Date of birth: 30 August 1967 (age 59)
- Place of birth: Edinburgh, Scotland
- Position: Defender

Team information
- Current team: Hibernian (head of academy coaching)

Youth career
- Hutchison Vale
- 1984–1985: Dundee United

Senior career*
Years	Team	Apps	(Gls)
1985–1989	Hibernian	109	(10)
1989–1990	Brentford	47	(10)
1990–1994	Falkirk	153	(22)
1994–1999	Motherwell	109	(5)
1999–2001	Dunfermline Athletic	30	(2)
2001	Airdrieonians	6	(0)
2001	Western Knights		
2001–2002	Berwick Rangers	6	(0)
2002–2004	Falkirk	5	(0)

International career
1988–1989	Scotland U21	2	(0)

Managerial career
- 2009–2010: Falkirk
- 2019: Hibernian (caretaker)
- 2019: Hibernian (caretaker)
- * Club domestic league appearances and goals

Eddie May (born 30 August 1967) is a Scottish former football player and coach.

== Playing career ==
He played as a midfielder and full back for several clubs, including Hibernian, Falkirk and Motherwell during the 1980s and 1990s. When he joined Brentford in July 1989, May's £167,000 transfer fee was a then-club record.

== Coaching career ==
After retiring as a player, May became a coach, developing young players for Falkirk. May was appointed as the manager of Falkirk in June 2009, with former player Steven Pressley and Alex Smith assisting him. His first competitive game was a 1–0 victory over FC Vaduz in the UEFA Europa League qualifying rounds, although Falkirk eventually lost their first ever European tie 2–1 on aggregate, becoming the first British club to lose a European tie to a club from Liechtenstein. May developed a reputation for being brutally honest during his spell in charge at Falkirk. May resigned as Falkirk manager soon afterwards, however, with the team bottom of the SPL.

May returned to football in June 2010, becoming a youth coach with Rangers. He was appointed high performance coach at the University of Stirling in August 2012. May returned to boyhood club Hibernian in August 2014 when he became their academy coaching manager. He was put in caretaker charge of the Hibernian first team in January 2019, after Neil Lennon was suspended by the club. After his first game in charge, May said that he was not interested in becoming a manager again because he had not enjoyed that role at Falkirk. May took charge of four games until Paul Heckingbottom was appointed head coach. May was again placed in caretaker charge in November 2019, after Heckingbottom was sacked. He managed one game during this spell, a 4–1 win at St Johnstone.

== Managerial statistics ==
As of match played 9 November 2019

Managerial record by team and tenure
Team	Nat	From	To	Record								Ref
Team	Nat	From	To	G	W	D	L	GF	GA	GD	Win %	Ref
Falkirk	(Scotland)	23 June 2009	11 February 2010	27	4	8	15	18	43	−25	14.81	
Hibernian (caretaker)	(Scotland)	26 January 2019	13 February 2019	4	2	0	2	7	6	+1	50.00	
Hibernian (caretaker)	(Scotland)	4 November 2019	15 November 2019	1	1	0	0	4	1	+3	100.00	
Career Total				32	7	8	17	29	50	−21	21.88	—

== Acting role ==
May appeared for a brief goal in Rangers colours in the movie A Shot at Glory which also starred Robert Duvall, Ally McCoist, Brian Cox, Michael Keaton and Owen Coyle.

== Honours ==
Falkirk

- Scottish Challenge Cup: 1993–94
