= Bobby Thomson (footballer, born 1955) =

Scottish footballer

Personal information
- Full name: Robert Thomson
- Date of birth: 21 March 1955 (age 71)
- Place of birth: Glasgow, Scotland
- Height: 5 ft 10 in (1.78 m)
- Position: Midfielder

Youth career
- –1973: Glasgow United

Senior career*
Years	Team	Apps	(Gls)
1973–1978	St Johnstone	118	(17)
1978–1981	Greenock Morton	90	(25)
1981–1982	Middlesbrough	20	(2)
1982–1985	Hibernian	62	(12)
1985	→ Greenock Morton (loan)	11	(2)
1985–1987	Blackpool	52	(6)
1987	Hartlepool United	3	(0)
1987–1988	Hamilton Academical	22	(4)
- Southport

International career
1978–1980	Scottish League XI	2	(0)
- * Club domestic league appearances and goals

Robert "Bobby" Thomson (born 21 March 1955) is a Scottish former professional footballer who played as a midfielder.

Glasgow-born Thomson began his League career with St Johnstone and would spend five years at the club before moving to Greenock Morton. He moved to England to play for Middlesbrough but returned to Scotland a year later to play for Hibernian. Thomson played 78 games for Hibs, but he was banned for six months after an incident with a linesman during a match against St Johnstone in 1983. He was a regular under the management of Pat Stanton, but fell out of favour when John Blackley became Hibs manager. Thomson briefly returned to Morton in 1985, on loan from Hibs.

Thomson joined Blackpool in August 1985, at a time when the club was about to embark on something of a revival under the management of Sam Ellis. "Thomson's aggression and experience will stiffen competition in the attack," said Ellis of the signing. A brief spell at Hartlepool United followed, before joining Hamilton Academical. Thomson then moved into non-League football with Southport.

Since retiring from football, Thomson has been employed as a day care worker. His daughter, Hollie, has played for Hibernian and Scotland.
