= Tony Higgins (footballer) =

Scottish footballer

Personal information
- Date of birth: 3 June 1954 (age 72)
- Place of birth: Glasgow, Scotland
- Position: Midfielder

Senior career*
Years	Team	Apps	(Gls)
1972–1979	Hibernian	103	(23)
1979–1982	Partick Thistle	56	(9)
1982–1984	Greenock Morton	10	(0)
1984–1987	Stranraer	43	(9)
Total		212	(41)
- * Club domestic league appearances and goals

Anthony Higgins (born 3 June 1954) is a Scottish former professional footballer.

== Club career ==
During his career Higgins played for Hibernian, Partick Thistle, Greenock Morton and Stranraer. He played for Hibernian in the marathon 1979 Scottish Cup Final.

== Other work ==
After retiring as a player, Higgins became chairman of the Scottish Professional Footballers' Association. He left that position in 2006 to become the Scottish representative of FIFPro, the international footballers' union, though as of 2021 he was also still president of PFA Scotland acting in an advisory capacity.

He also occasionally appears as a pundit on the BBC Scotland football programme Sportscene.
