= Gary Murray =

Scottish footballer

Personal information
- Date of birth: 19 August 1959 (age 67)
- Place of birth: Dundee, Scotland
- Position: Forward

Youth career
- Blairgowrie

Senior career*
Years	Team	Apps	(Gls)
1977–1980	Montrose	85	(39)
1980–1984	Hibernian	79	(16)
1984–1986	Forfar Athletic	25	(9)
1986–1991	Montrose	157	(53)
Total		346	(117)
- * Club domestic league appearances and goals

Gary Murray (born 19 August 1959) is a Scottish former professional footballer who played as a forward. Gary is in the Montrose Hall of Fame.

== Career ==
Born in Dundee, Murray played for Montrose (two spells), Hibernian and Forfar Athletic in the Scottish Football League.

== Personal life ==
His son Simon is also a footballer, and also played for both Montrose and Hibernian. He has three other children: Laura, Francesca and Eddie from eldest to youngest.
