= Joe McBride (footballer, born 1960) =

Scottish footballer

Personal information
- Full name: Joseph McBride
- Date of birth: 7 August 1960 (age 66)
- Place of birth: Glasgow, Scotland
- Position: Winger

Team information
- Current team: Scotland U17 (coach)

Senior career*
Years	Team	Apps	(Gls)
1979–1982	Everton	57	(9)
1982–1984	Rotherham United	45	(12)
1984–1985	Oldham Athletic	36	(5)
1985–1988	Hibernian	81	(11)
1988–1991	Dundee	49	(5)
1991–1994	East Fife	88	(19)
1994–1996	Albion Rovers	56	(10)
1996	Livingston	2	(0)
1996	Hamilton Academical	3	(0)
Total		414	(71)

International career
1980	Scotland U21	1	(0)
- * Club domestic league appearances and goals

Joseph McBride (born 7 August 1960) is a Scottish former professional footballer who played for several clubs, including Everton, Rotherham United, Hibernian, and Dundee. McBride's father, also named Joe, was a prolific goalscorer during the 1960s.

== Playing career ==
Born in Glasgow, McBride junior started his career with Everton in the late 1970s, and he scored on his debut for the club, against Bolton. After spells with Rotherham and Oldham, McBride signed for Hibernian in 1985. McBride's new manager was John Blackley, who had played with McBride's father for Hibs during the late 1960s and early 1970s. His most significant contribution for Hibs was scoring two goals in an Edinburgh derby at Tynecastle. McBride subsequently had spells with Dundee, East Fife, Albion Rovers, Livingston and Hamilton.

== Coaching career ==
McBride became a coach during his time at Albion Rovers, and was made caretaker manager when Jimmy Crease resigned as manager in December 1995. He subsequently became a youth coach at Celtic, developing players including Aiden McGeady, and Cillian Sheridan. A reorganisation of Celtic's coaching staff in 2008 meant that McBride left the club.

McBride subsequently assisted Willie McStay at Újpest FC in Budapest, Hungary and in June 2010, joined Watford as a youth coach, working under the management of fellow Scot Malky Mackay. McBride followed Mackay to Cardiff City and was appointed first team coach on 30 June 2011.

On 3 October 2014, McBride was named as Hibernian under-20 player development coach.

As of 2018, he was the dedicated coach for the Scottish Football Association's Performance Schools project based at Holyrood Secondary School in south Glasgow.
