= Willie Jamieson =

English footballer

Personal information
- Full name: William George Jamieson
- Date of birth: 27 April 1963 (age 63)
- Place of birth: Barnsley, England
- Position: Central defender

Youth career
- Edina Hibs Tynecastle Boys Club
- 1979–1980: Hibernian

Senior career*
Years	Team	Apps	(Gls)
1980–1985	Hibernian	117	(27)
1985–1990	Hamilton Academical	148	(8)
1990–1992	Dundee	90	(6)
1992–1994	Partick Thistle	87	(4)
1994–1995	Heart of Midlothian	20	(3)
1995–1997	Ayr United	52	(4)
1997–1998	Coleraine	16	(1)
1998–1999	Partick Thistle	25	(2)
Total		555	(55)

Managerial career
- 2002: Newtongrange Star
- * Club domestic league appearances and goals

William George Jamieson (born 27 April 1963) is a former football player, who played as a central defender for several clubs in the Scottish Football League, including Hibernian and Heart of Midlothian.

Jamieson won the Scottish First Division (second tier title) four times: with Hibs in 1980–81, with Hamilton Academical in 1985–86 and 1987–88 and with Dundee in 1991–92. He was signed by Hearts in December 1994, transferring from Partick Thistle (where he had been club captain) in exchange for Wayne Foster. He moved on to Ayr United where he added a Second Division (third tier) title to his medal collection in 1996–97.

Jamieson later played for junior club Newtongrange Star and managed the club for six months in 2002.
