= Ally McLeod =

Scottish footballer (born 1951)

Personal information
- Full name: Alexander Hector McMillan McLeod
- Date of birth: 1 January 1951 (age 75)
- Place of birth: Glasgow, Scotland
- Position: Striker

Youth career
- –1970: Renfrew

Senior career*
Years	Team	Apps	(Gls)
1970–1973	St Mirren	80	(53)
1973–1974	Southampton	3	(0)
1974	→ Huddersfield Town (loan)	4	(1)
1974–1982	Hibernian	208	(71)
1982	Stenhousemuir	3	(0)
1982–1983	Hamilton Academical	3	(0)
1983–1984	Queen of the South	2	(0)

International career
1978–1979	Scotland U21	4	(3)
1980	Scottish Football League XI	1	(0)
- * Club domestic league appearances and goals

Alexander Hector McMillan McLeod (born 1 January 1951 in Glasgow) is a Scottish former professional footballer who played as a striker for many league clubs in Scotland and England.

McLeod played for Renfrew Juniors, where he had been successfully turned from a midfielder into a striker by manager Tommy Barrie. McLeod began his senior career with St Mirren in 1970. He scored four goals in one Scottish League Cup game for St Mirren against Rangers at Ibrox.

Southampton then signed McLeod, but he failed to settle in Hampshire and he returned to Scotland with Hibernian. MacLeod, who was a relatively prolific goalscorer in a defensive era, scored for Hibernian in the 1979 Scottish Cup Final second replay against Rangers.
