= Ally Brazil =

Scottish footballer

Personal information
- Date of birth: 10 December 1958 (age 67)
- Place of birth: Currie, Scotland
- Position: Defender

Senior career*
Years	Team	Apps	(Gls)
1976–1986	Hibernian	203	(7)
1986–1987	Hamilton Academical	24	(0)
1987–1992	Forfar Athletic	136	(3)
Total		363	(10)

International career
1978	Scotland U21	1	(0)
- * Club domestic league appearances and goals

Ally(Benny)Brazil (born 10 December 1958) is a Scottish former footballer, who played over 200 league games for Hibernian. He played in all three games of the marathon 1979 Scottish Cup Final, which Hibs lost in extra time of the second replay. He played in the Hamilton Academical side that knocked Rangers out the Scottish Cup in 1987. He then went on and played for Forfar Athletic and played the best football of his career under a few different managers. He later dropped in to the junior ranks playing for Armadale, Bonnyrigg Rose and Stoneyburn. He also was coach to local amateur side Balerno Athletic for many years. He later went on to work as a bus driver for Lothian Buses.

His son, Alan Brazil, played for Aston Villa, Arbroath, Stenhousemuir and Berwick Rangers as a striker.
