= Ralph Callachan =

Scottish footballer and manager

Personal information
- Date of birth: 29 April 1955 (age 71)
- Place of birth: Edinburgh, Scotland
- Height: 5 ft 10 in (1.78 m)
- Position: Midfielder

Youth career
- Tynecastle B.C.

Senior career*
Years	Team	Apps	(Gls)
1973–1977	Heart of Midlothian	78	(9)
1977–1978	Newcastle United	9	(0)
1978–1986	Hibernian	218	(26)
1986	Greenock Morton	1	(0)
1986–1988	Meadowbank Thistle	57	(3)
1988–1992	Berwick Rangers	101	(5)
Total		464	(43)

Managerial career
- 1990–1992: Berwick Rangers
- * Club domestic league appearances and goals

Ralph Callachan (born 29 April 1955) is a Scottish former footballer, who played for three senior clubs in Edinburgh; Hearts, Hibs and Meadowbank Thistle. He played in Scottish Cup finals for both Hearts and Hibs, but both were lost to Rangers. Hearts lost 3–1 in 1976 and Hibs lost 3–2 in the second replay of 1979.

Callachan started his career with Hearts, where he made enough of an impact to earn a £90,000 move to Newcastle United. He only played nine league games in England before returning to Edinburgh, this time with Hibernian. Hibs' popular full-back John Brownlie was sent to Newcastle as part of the deal to bring Callachan to Easter Road.

He also served as Berwick Rangers manager for two years, acting as a player/manager.
