= Gordon Rae =

Scottish footballer and manager

Personal information
- Date of birth: 3 May 1958 (age 68)
- Place of birth: Edinburgh, Scotland
- Positions: Centre back; centre forward

Youth career
- Whitehill Welfare
- 1975–1977: Hibernian

Senior career*
Years	Team	Apps	(Gls)
1977–1990	Hibernian	347	(47)
1990–1992	Partick Thistle	77	(3)
1992	Hamilton Academical	9	(0)
1992–1993	Meadowbank Thistle	21	(2)
Total		454	(52)

Managerial career
- Gala Fairydean
- Edinburgh City
- Newtongrange Star
- * Club domestic league appearances and goals

Gordon Rae (born 3 May 1958) is a Scottish retired footballer, who played mainly as a defender for Hibernian, Partick Thistle, Hamilton Academical and Meadowbank Thistle. He also played sometimes as a centre forward, scoring over 50 goals in the Scottish Football League in his career.

== Career ==
Rae signed for Hibernian as a 17-year-old from Whitehill Welfare in 1975. He made his first team debut two years later, and scored in a 2–0 win against Rangers at Ibrox in his second appearance. He became club captain, appeared in the marathon 1979 Scottish Cup Final and won a First Division winners' medal in 1981.

Rae was awarded a testimonial match by Hibs in 1988, played against Manchester United. Joe Tortolano was sent off during the match for a tackle on Gordon Strachan.

He joined Partick Thistle for £65,000 in 1990, and helped them win promotion to the Premier Division in 1992. He finished his playing career after the 1992–93 season, during which he played for Hamilton Academical and then Meadowbank Thistle.

He left Meadowbank to become manager of Gala Fairydean, in a spell that coincided with their failed attempt to enter the Scottish Football League in 1994. He was sacked by Gala after a Scottish Cup defeat by East Fife, who then recruited him as an assistant coach.

He went on to manage Edinburgh City before working in Hibs' youth system. He left Hibs in November 2002 to manage junior side Newtongrange Star.
